= Magik Six: Live in Amsterdam =

Compilation album by DJ Tiësto
- Released: July 17, 2000 (Netherlands)
- Recorded: June 23, 2000
- Venue: Wildlife Event (Melkweg, Amsterdam)
- Genre: Trance
- Length: 77:49; 202:28 (unmixed version)
- Label: Black Hole
- Producer: Tiësto

Magik chronology
Magik Five: Heaven Beyond (2000)	Magik Six: Live in Amsterdam (2000)	Magik Seven: Live in Los Angeles (2001)

Tiësto chronology
Magik Five: Heaven Beyond (2000)	Magik Six: Live in Amsterdam (2000)	Summerbreeze (2001)

Alternative cover

Singles from Magik Six: Live in Amsterdam
- 1. "Wasteland" / "Summerbreeze" Released: 2000

Magik Six: Live in Amsterdam is the sixth album in the Magik series by trance DJ and producer Tiësto. As with the rest of the Magik series, the album is a live turntable mix. It was recorded on June 23, 2000, during a Wildlife event at Melkweg, Amsterdam.

== Track listing ==
Mixed Version

1. Afterburn – "North Pole" – 6:05 (Mislabeled as Afterburn – "Fratty Boy" )
2. Sunburst – "Eyeball" [John Johnson Remix] – 4:32
3. Yahel and Eyal Barkan – "Voyage" – 4:29
4. Free Radical – "Surreal" [En Motion Remix] – 4:15
5. Fire & Ice – "Silent Cry" – 5:35 (Mislabeled as Fire & Ice – "Forever Young")
6. The Swimmer – "Purple Cloud" – 5:09
7. Delerium – "Silence" [DJ Tiësto In Search Of Sunrise Remix] – 6:25
8. Moogwai – "Viola" [Armin van Buuren Remix] – 7:41
9. Kamaya Painters – "Wasteland" – 4:27
10. Cloud 69 – "Sixty Nine Ways" – 5:51
11. Airwave – "Escape From Nowhere" – 5:49
12. Dawnseekers – "Gothic Dream" [John Johnson Remix] – 4:35
13. Push – "Till We Meet Again" [Album Mix] – 4:39
14. VDM – "No Hesitation" – 3:18
15. Pulser – "Cloudwalking" [Astral Mix] – 4:49

Unmixed Version

1. Afterburn – "North Pole" – 7:17 (Mislabeled as Afterburn – "Fratty Boy" )
2. Sunburst – "Eyeball" [John Johnson Remix] – 8:17
3. Yahel and Eyal Barkan – "Voyage" – 6:23
4. Free Radical – "Surreal" [En Motion Remix] – 6:51
5. Fire & Ice – "Silent Cry" – 10:09 (Mislabeled as Fire & Ice – "Forever Young")
6. The Swimmer – "Purple Cloud" – 6:17
7. Delerium – "Silence" [DJ Tiësto In Search Of Sunrise Remix] – 11:33
8. Moogwai – "Viola" [Armin van Buuren Remix] – 9:55
9. Kamaya Painters – "Wasteland" – 7:41
10. Cloud 69 – "Sixty Nine Ways" – 8:11
11. Airwave – "Escape From Nowhere" – 11:19
12. Dawnseekers – "Gothic Dream" [John Johnson Remix] – 6:38
13. Push – "Till We Meet Again" [Album Mix] – 8:32
14. VDM – "No Hesitation" – 6:06
15. Pulser – "Cloudwalking" [Astral Mix] – 9:59
