= Magik Five: Heaven Beyond =

Compilation album by DJ Tiësto
- Released: February 3, 2000 (Netherlands)
- Recorded: 2000
- Genre: Trance
- Length: 72:49
- Label: Black Hole
- Producer: Tiësto

DJ Tiësto chronology
In Search of Sunrise (1999)	Magik Five: Heaven Beyond (2000)	Magik Six: Live in Amsterdam (2000)

Magik Five: Heaven Beyond is the fifth album in the Magik series by trance DJ and producer Tiësto. As with the rest of the Magik series, the album is a live turntable mix.

== Track listing ==
1. Armin van Buuren and DJ Tiësto present Alibi – "Eternity" (Innercity Mix) – 5:08
2. Allure – "No More Tears" – 4:54
3. Kamaya Painters – "Cryptomnesia" – 4:39
4. Atlantis – "Fiji" – 5:51
5. Twilight – "Platina" (Maurits Paardekooper Remix) – 2:33
6. Eve – "Riser" – 3:43
7. Fire & Ice – "Neverending Melody" – 5:29
8. Yahel – "Open Your Mind" (Magikal Remake) – 5:46
9. Airwave – "Alone In The Dark" – 5:46
10. Chant – "Sweet Images" (DJ Sakin and Friends remix) – 4:30
11. Deniro – "State Of Mind" – 5:16
12. DJ Merlyn – "Stupid" – 4:59 (Mislabeled as DJ Merlyn – "Krass")
13. DJ Arabesque – "Serendipity" (Mas Mix) – 3:41
14. Oliver Lieb – "Subraumstimulation" (Main Mix) – 3:27
15. Transa – "Supernova" – 4:37
16. Rank 1 – "Airwave" – 3:31

== Charts ==
Magik Five spent 10 weeks on the Dutch compilation album charts, peaking at number 4 in March 2000. In Norway the album peaked at number 10.
