= Prelude and Fugue in C major, BWV 846 =

Keyboard composition by Johann Sebastian Bach

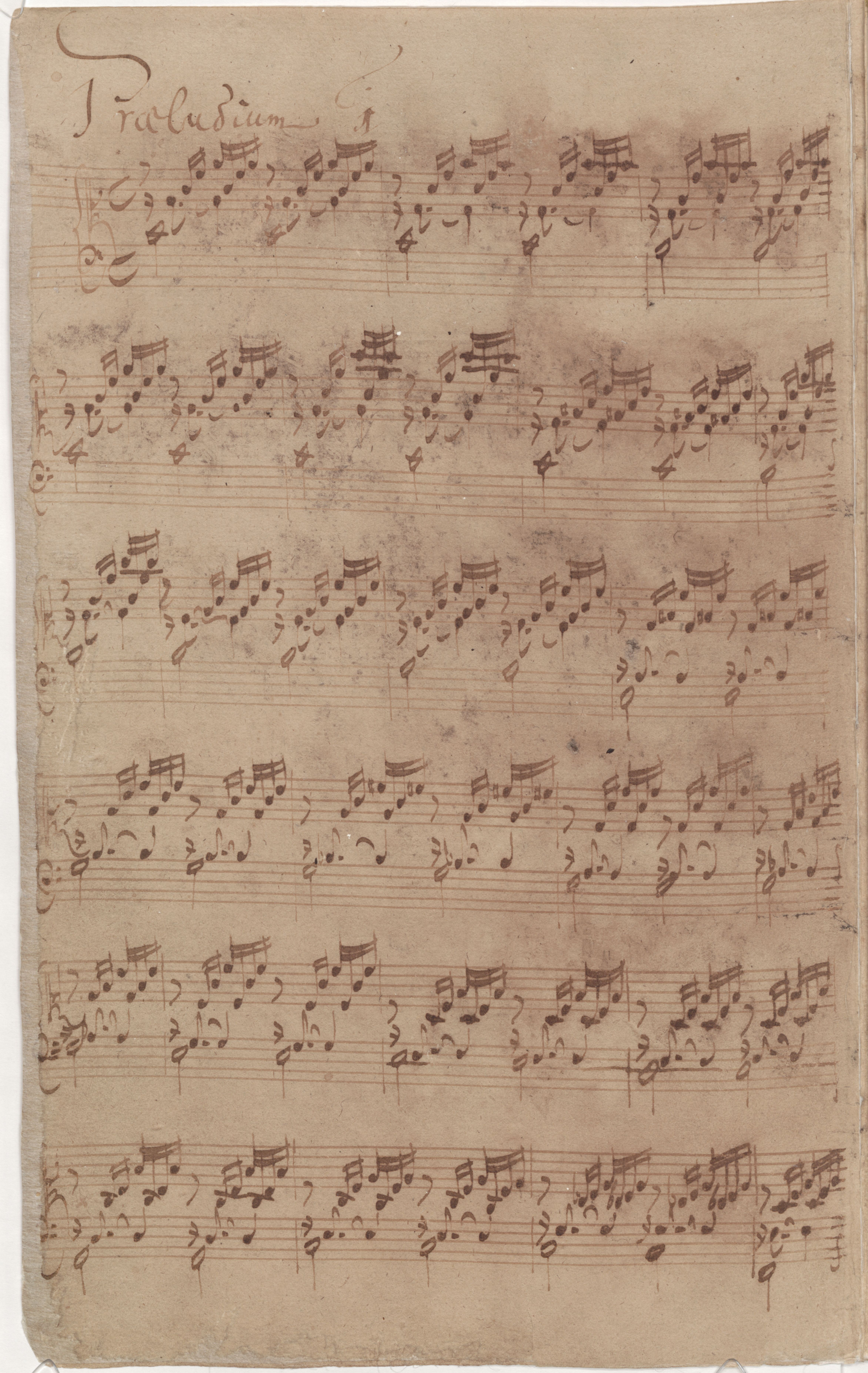
Bach's autograph (1722) of the first prelude of Book I

The Prelude and Fugue in C major, BWV 846, is a keyboard composition written by Johann Sebastian Bach. It is the first prelude and fugue in the first book of The Well-Tempered Clavier, a series of 48 preludes and fugues by the composer. An early version of the prelude, BWV 846A, is found in the Klavierbüchlein für Wilhelm Friedemann Bach.

== Analysis ==
=== Prelude ===
The prelude is 35 bars long and consists mostly of broken chords. Below are the first four bars of the prelude:

The prelude continues like this with different variations on harmony and change of key. The prelude ends with a single C major chord.

=== Fugue ===
The fugue is 27 bars long and is written for four voices. It starts with a two-measure subject in the alto voice. The first voice to join is the soprano, which replies with the answer in the dominant key (G major).

The answer is repeated in the tenor and bass voices when they enter. The soprano then repeats the subject, to which the tenor answers in the dominant, modulating to G minor and then to G. The piece then continues with each of the four voices restating the subject multiple times throughout, modulating to various related keys. A four-voice canon is formed in bars 14 - 15. The fugue then culminates with a four-bar long forming of the tonic triad.

== Legacy ==
=== Schwencke measure ===
Some earlier editions of the prelude contain an extra bar between bars 22 and 23 known as the "Schwencke measure", a measure allegedly added by Christian Friedrich Gottlieb Schwencke in an attempt to correct what he or someone else erroneously deemed a "faulty" progression (though it may be accidentally corrupted manuscript(s) associated with Schwencke), even though this sort of progression was standard in the music of Bach's time.

However, according to Hermann Keller, "Schwencke was a sophisticated and well-informed musician who was probably not thinking of improving Bach."

This is echoed by a descendant who published an article claiming the measure was inserted by Carl Schwencke, C.F.G Schwencke’s son by forging his father’s hand and later, also Beethoven’s.

Measure 22 contains an F♯ in the bass, which skips to A♭ in measure 23, creating a diminished third; while the Schwencke measure has a G in the bass of a ^{6}_{4} (second inversion) minor chord with C as its root borrowed from the parallel harmonic minor. The A♭ may be considered as its enharmonic, G♯, which creates a major second step with F♯, but A♭ functions as an upper leading-tone (parallel natural or descending melodic minor). Franz Kroll may have been the first to question and edit the measure, first in 1862, and the measure does not occur in Bach's student Heinrich Gerber's 1725 manuscript copy. August Halm was also critical of the measure, questioning its logic as early as 1905.

=== Gounod's "Ave Maria" ===
Ave Maria by Gounod
Gounod's Ave Maria, arranged for piano and cello. Performed by John Michel

Charles Gounod composed a melody that was designed to be based on the prelude; it was later used as a setting to Ave Maria. The edition of the prelude used by Gounod contains the Schwencke measure.

=== 20th century ===
Arvo Pärt's "Credo" is built around Bach's C major prelude, first unravelling it through the central cacophonous twelve-tone part of the work, then remerging on the piano with the chorus and orchestra joining in harmony for the massive finale.

Mstislav Rostropovich compared this Prelude to the introductory bars of the prelude of Bach's Cello Suite No. 1, in a video named Rostropovich interprets Bach, filmed in 1991 at the Basilique Sainte Madeleine in Vézelay, France.

"Repent Walpurgis", the last track on the debut album by progressive rock group Procol Harum, contains an arrangement of the prelude by band leader Gary Brooker.

"Fromage Frais", the sixth track on the band Union Jack's debut studio album There Will Be No Armageddon, is an Acid trance arrangement of the prelude.

=== Derived works and influence on popular culture ===
- Douglas R. Hofstadter's "Prelude... Ant Fugue" dialogues are explicitly inspired by J. S. Bach's Prelude and Fugue in C major.
- Webber's Don't cry for me Argentina is not only based on the Prelude but also on Gounod's Ave Maria adaptation.

== Further media ==
=== Full length audio of the prelude or fugue ===
Prelude in C major (BWV 846)
Performed on a French harpsichord ...
... tuned in equal temperament by Robert Schröter

Performed in ...
... Kirnberger temperament

Performed on a French harpsichord ...
... tuned in Werckmeister III temperament by Robert Schröter

Performed in Werckmeister temperament

Performed on a piano ...
... by Kimiko Ishizaka

performed on a Flemish harpsichord ...
... by Martha Goldstein

Fugue in C major (BWV 846)
Performed on a piano ...
... by Kimiko Ishizaka

Performed on a Flemish harpsichord ...
... by Martha Goldstein

=== Excerpts ===
Prelude in C major (BWV 846)
Bars 1 to 5...
... with wolf interval

Bars 1 to 5 ...
... with comma differences without harmonic seventh

Bars 1 to 5 ...
... with comma differences with harmonic seventh

Bars 5 to 11 ...
... with wolf interval

Bars 5 to 11 ...
... with comma differences without harmonic seventh

Bars 5 to 11 ...
... with comma differences with harmonic seventh
