= In Search of Sunrise =

Compilation album by DJ Tiësto
- Released: 22 November 1999 (Netherlands)
- Recorded: 1999
- Genre: Trance
- Length: 71:42
- Label: SongBird

In Search of Sunrise chronology
In Search of Sunrise (1999)	In Search of Sunrise 2 (2000)

DJ Tiësto chronology
Magik Four: A New Adventure (1999)	In Search of Sunrise (1999)	Magik Five: Heaven Beyond (2000)

Singles from In Search of Sunrise
- 1. "Far from Over" / "Cryptomnesia" / "Soft Light" Released: December 1999

Professional ratings
Review scores
Source	Rating
AllMusic	link

In Search of Sunrise is the first compilation album in the In Search of Sunrise series mixed by Dutch trance producer and DJ Tiësto, released on 22 November 1999 in the Netherlands (see 1999 in music).

== Track listing ==
Disc 1
No.	Title	Artist(s)	Length
1.	"The Reachers of Civilization"	York	5:31
2.	"Calling Your Name" (Ferry Corsten Remix)	Libra presents Taylor - Anomaly	4:04
3.	"Honey" (Chicane Club Mix)	Billie Ray Martin	6:42
4.	"Time Gate" (Update)	Marc Vision	3:20
5.	"Mercury and Solace" (BT 12" Mastermix)	BT	6:49
6.	"Dark Blue"	Cabala	5:48
7.	"I Trance You" (Pappa & Gilbey Mix)	Gypsy	5:06
8.	"Going Up"	Yahel & DJ Miss T	4:03
9.	"Sun Is Shining" (Mash Up Matt Remix)	Technique	5:22
10.	"Walhalla"	Gouryella	3:31
11.	"Far From Over"	Kamaya Painters	3:43
12.	"I Believe" (DJ Tandu Remix)	Lange	7:38
13.	"Remember (To The Millennium)" (Lange Remix)	The Morrighan	5:34
14.	"Sparkles" (Magikal Remake)	DJ Tiësto	4:19
Total length:			71:42

== Charts ==
1999 chart performance
Chart (1999)	Peak position
Dutch Compilation Albums (Compilation Top 30)	7
Norwegian Albums (VG-lista)	35

2002 chart performance
Chart (2002)	Peak position
UK Independent Albums (OCC)	29
