= Summerbreeze =

Compilation album by DJ Tiësto
- Released: 10 October 2000 (Worldwide)
- Genre: Trance
- Length: 73:59
- Label: Nettwerk
- Producer: Tiësto

DJ Tiësto chronology
| Magik Six: Live in Amsterdam (2000) | Summerbreeze (2000) | In Search of Sunrise 2 (2000) |

Singles from Summerbreeze
- 1. "Wonder Where You Are?" / "Wonder?" Released: June 2000

Professional ratings
Review scores
| Source | Rating |
|---|---|
| Allmusic | 2.5/5 stars |

Summerbreeze is a dance mix compilation album by trance artist DJ Tiësto, released on October 10, 2000.

== Track listing ==
1. Aria - "Dido" [Armin van Buuren's Universal Religion Mix] — 7:46
2. BT - "Dreaming" [Libra Mix] — 4:50
3. Yahel - "Going Up" [Magikal Remake] — 6:10
4. Sisko - "Light Over Me" [Gate Of Light Mix] — 6:17
5. Jaimy & Kenny D - "Caught Me Running" [DJ Tiësto's Summerbreeze Remix] — 6:09
6. Cabala - "Dark Blue" [Original Mix] — 5:15
7. Allure - "No More Tears" [Aquilia Remix] — 4:47
8. Kamaya Painters - "Far From Over" [Oliver Lieb Remix] — 5:56
9. Dawnseekers - "Gothic Dream" [John Johnson Remix] — 4:35
10. DJ Tiësto - "Sparkles" [Transa Remix] — 6:50
11. Delerium - "Silence" [DJ Tiësto's In Search Of Sunrise Remix] — 8:42
12. Major League - "Wonder?" — 6:43
