= Upfront Trance =

Compilation album by Matt Darey
- Released: May 17, 2005
- Genre: Trance
- Length: 158:13
- Label: Water Music Records

Professional ratings
Review scores
Source	Rating
Allmusic	link

Upfront Trance is a double album from DJ Matt Darey which was released in 2005. The two-CD album consists of two DJ sets performed by Darey.

== Track listing ==
=== Disc one ===
1. Smith & Pledger – "Forever (Aspekt Mix)" – 7:42
2. Yilmaz Altanhan – "Eighties (Özgür Can Remix)" – 6:13
3. Whiteroom – "Someday (Original Mix)" – 8:19
4. Ridgewalkers – "Find (Andy Moor Remix)" – 6:22
5. Tilt – "The World Doesn't Know (Original Mix)" – 8:27
6. Perry O'Neil – "Wave Force" – 6:31
7. Li Kwan – "Point Zero (Matt Darey Mix)" – 6:30
8. Art of Trance – "Mongoose (Tek^tonik Remix)" – 5:52
9. Oliver Prime – "Mind Games (Original Mix)" – 6:11
10. Sandler – "Theme Song (Original Mix)" – 7:30
11. Robert Gitelman – "Children Of The Sun (Original Mix)" – 4:19
12. Musikman – "Air (G&M Project Remix)" – 5:36

=== Disc two ===
1. Ernesto vs. Bastian – "Dark Side Of The Moon (Original Extended)" – 7:06
2. Blank & Jones – "Perfect Silence" – 4:01
3. L.S.G. – "Netherworld (Oliver Prime Remix)" – 5:40
4. Kyau vs. Albert – "Made Of Sun (KvA Hard Dub)" – 5:24
5. Ratty – "Sunrise (Here I Am) (Mark Sherry 2005 Sunburst Remix)" – 5:38
6. Adam White – "Ballerina (Matt Darey Remix)" – 5:13
7. Matt Darey – "Liberation 2005 (Darey Vs. Woods Mix)" – 6:00
8. Michael Splint – "Secrets (Broke My Heart) (Airbase Mix)" – 5:05
9. ATN – "Miss A Day" – 5:54
10. Lost Tribe – "Gamemaster (Michael Woods Mix)" – 7:31
11. Lost Tribe – "Possessed (Matt Darey Mix)" – 6:17
12. X-Cabs – "Neuro 04 (Original Mix)" – 6:11
13. Martin Roth & Frank Ellrich – "The Orange Theme (Martin Roth Mix)" – 8:41
