= Magik Four: A New Adventure =

Compilation album by DJ Tiësto
- Released: June 6, 1999 (Netherlands)
- Recorded: 1999
- Genre: Trance
- Length: 73:43
- Label: Black Hole
- Producer: Tiësto

DJ Tiësto chronology
Live at Innercity: Amsterdam RAI (1999)	Magik Four: A New Adventure (1999)	In Search of Sunrise (1999)

Original cover
- Patrick Woodroffe

Singles from Magik Four: A New Adventure
- 1. "Exceptionnally Beautiful" / "Reflections" Released: September 1999; 2. "Sparkles" Released: November 1999; 3. "We Ran at Dawn" Released: January 2000

Professional ratings
Review scores
Source	Rating
Allmusic	3/5 stars

Magik Four: A New Adventure is the fourth album in the Magik series by trance DJ and producer Tiësto. As with the rest of the Magik series, the album is a live turntable mix.

Magik Four reached number 10 in the Dutch compilation album charts.

== Track listing ==
1. Darkstar – "Feel Me" – 5:58
2. Kamaya Painters – "Northern Spirit" – 4:17
3. The Ambush – "Everlast" – 3:56
4. Art of Trance – "Easter Island" [Cygnus X Mix] – 4:02
5. Arrakis – "Aira Force" [Main Mix] – 5:27
6. Sean Dexter – "Synthetica" [Extended Mix] – 4:36
7. The Sneaker – "Scatterbomb" [String Mix] – 4:53
8. Kai Tracid – "Your Own Reality" [Tracid Mix] – 2:22
9. Vimana – "We Came" – 7:32
10. Der Dritte Raum – "Trommelmaschine" – 3:33
11. DJ Tiësto – "Sparkles" – 5:47
12. Armin – "Communication" – 6:03
13. Allure – "We Ran At Dawn" – 3:57
14. Loop Control – "Exceptionally Beautiful" – 4:12
15. Mox Epoque featuring Nina – "I Feel My..." [Extended Instrumental] – 3:58
16. Mauro Picotto – "Pulsar" [Picotto Tea Mix] – 3:05
