= Revolution (Tiësto album) =

Compilation album by DJ Tiësto
- Released: May 7, 2001 (Netherlands)
- Recorded: 2001
- Genre: Trance
- Length: Disc 1: 76:42; Disc 2: 77:48
- Label: Virgin Records
- Producer: Tiësto

DJ Tiësto chronology
In My Memory (2001)	Revolution (2001)	Magik Seven: Live in Los Angeles (2001)

Alternative cover

Revolution is a double disc album by trance DJ/producer DJ Tiësto, released on May 7, 2001. Disc one is labeled Darkside, while the second CD is labeled Brightside.

== Track listing ==
=== Disc One (Darkside) ===
1. Delerium - "Innocente (Falling In Love)" [DJ Tiësto Remix] – 5:58
2. Leama - "Melodica" – 8:11
3. LN Movement - "Golden Desert (Part 2)" – 3:33
4. Ben Shaw - "So Strong" – 6:06
5. Joker Jam - "Innocence" – 6:34
6. Bullitt - "Cried To Dream" [Max Graham Remix] – 5:56
7. DJ Dazzle - "From Within" – 5:05
8. Hardy Heller & Ray Boye - "Lovin'" [Fred Numf vs. Five Point O Remix] – 4:04
9. J.T. Functions - "Running On E" – 3:37
10. Wheed Baskin - "Castle Rock" [Fred Numf vs. Five Point O. Remix] – 4:47
11. Kamaya Painters - "Wasteland" [Chab Remix] – 6:11
12. Ballroom - "Passenger" [Marc O'Tool Remix] – 5:13
13. Agnelli & Nelson - "Vegas" [Fear & Loathing Mix] – 3:19
14. V-Three - "Zuluu" – 2:50
15. The Francesco Farfa Meets Pleasure Team - "The Search" [Time & Space Mix] – 5:18

=== Disc Two (Brightside) ===
1. The Auranaut - "People Want To Be Needed" – 5:46
2. Three Drives - "Sunset On Ibiza" – 4:22
3. Goldenscan - "Sunrise" [Pulser Remix] – 4:43
4. Insigma - "Open Your Eyes" – 5:59
5. Airwave - "Mysteries Of Life" – 5:03
6. Utah Saints - "Lost Vagueness" [Oliver Lieb's Main Mix] – 4:22
7. Yahel & Eyal Barkan - "Voyage" – 5:16
8. Jan Johnston - "Flesh" [DJ Tiësto Mix] – 6:23
9. Riva - "Stringer" – 5:43
10. Moogwai - "Labyrinth Part 1" – 5:54
11. M.I.K.E. - "Sunrise At Palamos" – 4:54
12. DJ Tiësto - "Flight 643" – 6:27
13. The Green Martian - "Industry" – 3:50
14. Planisphere - "Moonshine" – 6:03
15. Push - "Strange World" [2000 Remake] – 3:03

== Charts ==
Revolution spent 5 weeks on the UK compilation album charts, peaking at number 32 in May 2001. In the Netherlands the album peaked at number 12.
