= Sparkles (song) =

Single by DJ Tiësto

from the album Magik Four: A New Adventure
- Released: November 1999
- Recorded: 1999
- Genre: Uplifting trance
- Length: 7:45 (Original Mix); 8:03 (Airscape Remix)
- Label: Black Hole; Nebula
- Songwriter(s): Tijs Verwest; Cor Fijneman
- Producer(s): DJ Tiësto; DJ Cor Fijneman

DJ Tiësto singles chronology
"Theme from Norefjell" (1999)	"Sparkles" (1999)	"Lethal Industry" (1999)

"Sparkles" is a song by Dutch disc jockey and producer DJ Tiësto. It was released in November 1999 in the Netherlands. Several versions of the song appear on 3 DJ Tiësto's compilations: Magik Four: A New Adventure (original version), In Search of Sunrise (Magikal Remake) and Summerbreeze (Transa remix).

== Track listing ==
12" / Digital Download (Netherlands)

1. "Sparkles" (Airscape Remix)- 8:03
2. "Sparkles" (Original) - 7:45
3. "Sparkles" (Magikal Remake) - 8:41

12" / Digital Download (UK)

1. "Sparkles" (Transa Remix) - 8:10
2. "Sparkles" (Original Mix) - 7:45
3. "Sparkles" (Airscape Remix) - 8:01
4. "Sparkles" (Sparecase Remix) - 7:57

12" (Germany)

1. "Sparkles" (Transa Remix) - 8:10
2. "Sparkles" (Airscape Remix) - 8:01
3. "Sparkles" (Starcase Remix) - 7:57
4. "Sparkles" (Original) - 7:45

12" / CD / Digital Download - Remixes (Netherlands)

1. "Sparkles" (Transa Remix) - 8:10
2. "Sparkles" (Airscape Remix) - 8:03
3. "Sparkles" (Starcase Remix) - 7:57

CD Maxi Single (Netherlands)

1. "Sparkles" (Radio Edit) - 4:25
2. "Sparkles" (Airscape Remix) - 8:03
3. "Sparkles" (Original Version) - 7:27
4. "Sparkles" (Magikal Remake) - 8:41

CD Single (Netherlands)

1. "Sparkles" (Radio Edit) - 4:25
2. "Sparkles" (Airscape Remix) - 8:03

12" - Airscape Remix (UK, 2004)

1. "Sparkles" (Airscape Instrumental Edit) - 3:18
2. "Sparkles" (Airscape Vocal Edit) - 3:19

== Charts ==
=== 2000 ===
Chart (2000)	Peak position
Norway (VG-lista)	14

=== 2004 reissue ===
Chart (2004)	Peak position
UK Singles (OCC)	88
