= In Search of Sunrise 2 =

Compilation album by DJ Tiësto
- Released: 30 November 2000
- Recorded: 2000
- Genre: Trance
- Length: 76:08
- Label: SongBird

In Search of Sunrise chronology
In Search of Sunrise (1999)	In Search of Sunrise 2 (2000)	In Search of Sunrise 3: Panama (2002)

DJ Tiësto chronology
Summerbreeze (2000)	In Search of Sunrise 2 (2000)	In My Memory (2001)

Professional ratings
Review scores
Source	Rating
Allmusic	link

In Search of Sunrise 2 is the second album in the In Search of Sunrise series mixed by Dutch trance producer and DJ Tiësto, released on 30 November 2000 (see 2000 in music). It was released with a special leaflet inside and with a special slipcase. The mix was recorded in Sydney, Australia; therefore, it has sometimes been mentioned as In Search of Sunrise 2: Australia or In Search of Sunrise 2: Sydney.

Note: The track times add up to 79:48, not 76:08. This is because Mekka - Diamondback is not included in versions of this set found online. Diamondback can be heard slightly at the 33:54 mark, but then the set skips to BT - Dreaming.

== Track listing ==
Disc 1
No.	Title	Artist(s)	Length
1.	"Tantrix"	Tastexperience	6:55
2.	"Golden Desert" (Part 2)	LN Movement	4:03
3.	"Summerbreeze"	Kamaya Painters	4:18
4.	"Touch Me"	Rui Da Silva	5:29
5.	"Eugina" (Michael Woods Remix)	Salt Tank	4:31
6.	"Perception" (New Vocal Mix)	Cass & Slide	8:38
7.	"Diamondback"	Mekka	5:20
8.	"Dreaming" (Lucid's 12" Club Mix)	BT	4:28
9.	"Delirio" (Venus Mix)	Baracoa	3:46
10.	"An Angel Saved My Life" (Mark Shimmon & 3rd Degree Bern's Mix)	Fortress	7:55
11.	"4AM" (Marc O' Tool Remix)	Ballroom	5:11
12.	"Home" (featuring Discovery)	Coast 2 Coast	5:48
13.	"Tyrantanic" (Slacker's Kingdom Come Mix)	Breeder	7:16
14.	"Airtight"	Max Graham	6:10
Total length:			76:08

== Release history ==
Country	Release date
Netherlands	November 30, 2000
United States	February 27, 2001
