= Serenade for Wind Instruments =

Serenade for Wind Instruments may refer to:

- Serenade for Wind Instruments (Dvořák) (in D minor)
- Serenade No. 10 (Mozart) (in B-flat major)
- Serenade No. 11 (Mozart) (in E-flat major)
- Serenade No. 12 (Mozart) (in C minor)

== See also ==
- Serenade for Thirteen Wind Instruments (disambiguation)
