= Space Age 2.0 =

Compilation album by DJ Tiësto & DJ Montana
- Released: March 7, 1999 (Netherlands)
- Recorded: 1998
- Genre: Electronic, trance, hard trance, tech house
- Length: 69:59
- Label: Black Hole
- Producer: Tijs Verwest; Ahmet Buyukkafali

DJ Tiësto & DJ Montana chronology
Magik Three: Far from Earth (1998)	Space Age 2.0 (1999)	Live at Innercity: Amsterdam RAI (1999)

Professional ratings
Review scores
Source	Rating
Allmusic	2.5/5 stars

Space Age 2.0 is a compilation album by DJ Tiësto and DJ Montana. It is the second release in the Space Age series.

== Track listing ==
Disc 1
No.	Title	Length
1.	"Space Shuffle - Chaos"	5:28
2.	"Antonio Montana - La Movida (Part 1)"	4:05
3.	"Pablo Gargano - Mornington Crescent"	3:22
4.	"Wild Bunch - Return of Groove Lounge"	4:22
5.	"Control Freaks - Subspace Interference (Jan Drivers' Stompin' Mix)"	2:50
6.	"R.S.P. - Funkanoid (Huntemann Remix)"	2:49
7.	"A3 - Imperial Forces"	4:27
8.	"Kobayashi - Release (Dub Mix)"	6:09
9.	"Fluid Inc. - Unit 2"	3:16
10.	"Transa - Behind The Sun"	4:53
11.	"Canyon - Purple Phaze"	3:48
12.	"Gouryella - Gorella"	4:51
13.	"Arrakis - The Spice (Silent Breed Mix)"	4:39
14.	"Mario Piu & Mauro Picotto - Spectra (Mas Mix)"	5:12
15.	"Tiësto, Montana & Storm - Bleckentrommel"	3:55
16.	"Aquaplex - Celebrating People"	5:53
