= Magik Three: Far from Earth =

Magik Three: Far From Earth

Compilation album by DJ Tiësto
- Released: October 14, 1998 (Netherlands)
- Recorded: 1998
- Genre: Trance
- Length: 73:31
- Label: Black Hole
- Producer: Tiësto

DJ Tiësto chronology
| Magik Two: Story of the Fall (1998) | Magik Three: Far From Earth (1998) | Space Age 2.0 (1998) |

Alternative covers
- Patrick Woodroffe

Singles from Magik Three: Far from Earth
- 1. "Theme from Norefjell" Released: 1999

Professional ratings
Review scores
| Source | Rating |
|---|---|
| Allmusic | 3/5 stars |

Magik Three: Far From Earth is the third album in the Magik series by trance DJ and producer Tiësto. As with the rest of the Magik series, the album is a live turntable mix.

== Track listing ==
1. DJ Tiësto – "Theme from Norefjell" [Magikal Remake] – 6:29
2. Maracca – "Invocation" – 3:14
3. Dove Beat – "La Paloma" [Ocean Remix] – 2:26
4. Chicane – "Lost You Somewhere" [Heliotropic Mix] – 5:06
5. Alex Whitcombe and Big C – "Ice Rain" [Solid Sleep's Cyper Rain Mix] – 5:31
6. Ayla – "Ayla" [Original DJ Taucher Mix] – 6:29
7. Hidden Sound System – "I Know" – 6:10
8. Hammock Brothers – "Sea" – 4:47
9. Dominion – "Lost Without You" [Zanzibar's Main Room Mix] – 5:27
10. Allure – "Cruising" – 3:26
11. Art of Trance – "Madagascar" [Cygnus X Remix] – 4:12
12. Tekara – "Breathe In You" [Tekara's M&M Dub] – 5:00
13. Classified Project – "Resurrection" – 3:30
14. Scoop – "Wings Of Love" – 3:23
15. Gouryella – "Gouryella" [Magik Version] – 3:23
16. Pob – "The Awakening" [Quietman Remix] – 4:51
