= Magik Two: Story of the Fall =

Compilation album by DJ Tiësto
- Released: May 8, 1998 (Netherlands)
- Recorded: 1998
- Genre: Trance
- Length: 73:44
- Label: Black Hole
- Producer: Tiësto

DJ Tiësto chronology
Space Age 1.0 (1998)	Magik Two: Story of the Fall (1998)	Magik Three: Far from Earth (1998)

Alternative covers
- Patrick Woodroffe

Singles from Magik Two: Story of the Fall
- 1. "Subspace Interference" Released: December 1998

Professional ratings
Review scores
Source	Rating
Allmusic	2.5/5 stars

Magik Two: Story of the Fall is the second album in the Magik series by trance DJ and producer Tiësto, who, at the time of the album's release was known as DJ Tiësto; the album was released on Tiësto's Black Hole record label. As with the rest of the Magik series, the album is a live turntable mix.

== Track listing ==
1. Delegate vs. Emo-Trance – "Re-Fresh EP: Return To Tazmania" – 5:35
2. Dominion – "Fortunes (VOX)" – 3:57
3. Allure – "Rejected" – 4:25
4. VDM – "Domino Runner" – 4:24
5. HH – "Planetary" – 4:10
6. Clear View – "Cry For Love" – 4:52
7. The Swimmer – "Stand By" – 6:14
8. Malcolm McLaren – "The Bell Song" [Lakmé dub] – 3:41
9. Binary Finary – "1998" – 3:41
10. Dos Deviants – "Elevate" – 6:26
11. Luke Cage – "Dawnbreaker" 4:00
12. Taucher – "Waters (Phase III)" – 5:13
13. Groovezone – "I Love The Music" – 5:03
14. Lord Of Tranz featuring DJ Hoxider – "Trancestors" (Original Mix) – 4:20
15. Hammock Brothers – "Earth" – 4:33
16. Control Freaks – "Subspace Interference" – 3:15
