= Simon Berry =

English trance music artist

Art of Trance
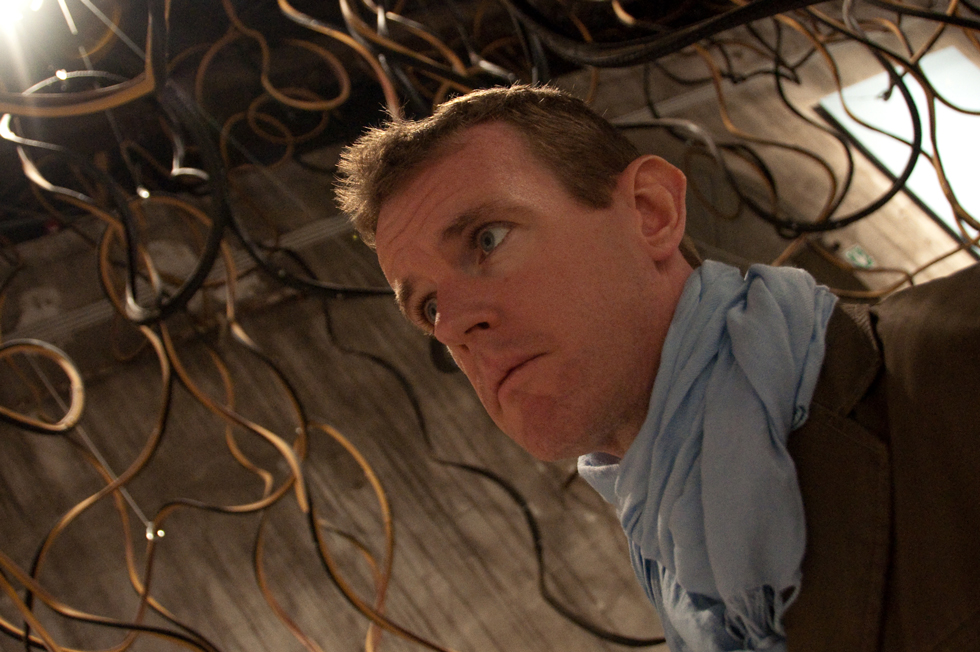
- Berry at the Venice Biennale

Background information
- Also known as: Poltergeist; Vicious Circles
- Born: Simon Paul Berry; 1970 (age 55–56)
- Origin: England
- Genres: Trance; techno
- Occupations: Electronic musician, composer, record producer, remixer, record label owner
- Years active: 1993–present
- Labels: Platipus Records; Platipus Music
- Website: www.platipus.com/artists/art-of-trance/

Simon Paul Berry (born in 1970), known by his alias Art of Trance, is an English trance music DJ. Berry is also known as Poltergeist or Vicious Circles, and has been a member of the trance groups Clanger, Conscious and Union Jack. He has been producing and remixing music since 1993. In addition to his work as an artist, Berry was the founder and head of Platipus Records, based in London. Initially his label only released his own tracks. His work was first distributed on vinyl and compact disc and then digital only from 2011.

== Career ==
On 15 June 2002, his track "Madagascar" reached number one on the UK Dance Singles Chart. His work has charted in the United Kingdom eight times as Art of Trance and the first time with "Vicious Circles" under the alias Poltergeist in 1996. Berry has remixed a number of tracks for other electronic musicians, including Quietman, Moogwai, Indiana, Matt Darey, Steve Jablonsky and Anthony Pappa. A remix of Yello's "Vicious Games" from the 1985 Stella album, charted in 1999. In 2003, he re-recorded a new version of Jan Johnston's "Calling your name" that charted at #80. His tracks appear on mixed compilations such as Tranceport 2, Global Underground 017: London, Upfront Trance, Magik Three: Far from Earth, Oakenfold Anthems, Beyond Euphoria, Ibiza Euphoria and Classic Euphoria.

Berry's music has been remixed by artists including Ferry Corsten, Cygnus X, Perfect Stranger, Mike Dierickx, Michael Woods, Telefon Tel Aviv and Gai Barone. Art of Trance performs at various international music festivals and parties. He was credited for the release to a wider audience of the single "Children" by Robert Miles after its initial release failed to chart.

== Production ==
Berry's music has been described variously as progressive trance, psychedelic trance, acid trance and techno. During the 1990s, Berry's music production was focused on his wide array of analog synthesizers. From 2005 on-wards, his work space shifted to the computer. His current hardware includes an Analogue Solutions Nyborg 12, Modal 008, Alesis Andromeda A6, Abstrakt Instruments Avalon and a Moog Sub 37. He uses Logic Pro and Reaktor with a range of plugins.

Art of Trance is well known for the usage of samples of natural sounds (or electronically produced imitations of natural sounds) in his tracks, like bird singing (e.g. "Easter Island", "Kaleidoscope" and "Madagascar"). The songs "Stealth" and "Blue Owl" were featured on the video game Midnight Club II. Various remixes have appeared on the SongBird and Black Hole Recordings music labels. Berry's work is currently distributed through Platipus Music.

Berry has described his style as deep trance, explaining his preference for "techno-based hypnotic progressive house with depth, and occasional psychedelic and melodic elements". He cites Depeche Mode, Vangelis, Tomita, Orbital, 808 State, Jean Michel Jarre, Wendy Carlos, Juan Atkins, Derrick May and Jeff Mills as his musical influences.

== Discography ==
External media

Audio
- "Curve Bender"
- "Before the Storm"

Video
- "Stratosphere"
- "Ultrafoxx"
- "Praxia"

=== Albums ===
- 1996 Wildlife on One
- 1999 Voice of Earth
- 2009 Retrospective

=== Singles ===
- 1993 "Cambodia"
- 1993 "Deeper Than Deep"
- 1993 "Gloria"
- 1993 "The Colours"
- 1995 "Octopus" / "Orange"
- 1996 "Wildlife on One"
- 1996 "Vicious Circles" (as Poltergeist) - UK #32
- 1997 "Kaleidoscope" - UK #83
- 1998 "Madagascar" - UK #68
- 1999 "Breath"
- 1999 "Easter Island" - UK #77
- 1999 "Madagascar" - UK #48
- 2000 "Vicious Circles" (as Vicious Circles)
- 2000 "Monsoon"
- 2000 "Breathe" - UK #76
- 2001 "Killamanjaro" - UK #82
- 2002 "Madagascar" - UK #41
- 2002 "Love Washes Over" - UK #60
- 2004 "Mongoose"
- 2004 "Turkish Bizarre"
- 2005 "Madagascar" / "Monsoon" ("Monsoon" features vocal sample from "Ever So Lonely")
- 2006 "Persia"
- 2009 "Madagascar Remastered 2009"
- 2009 "Voices of Earth" featuring Caroline Lavelle
- 2009 "Swarm"
- 2011 "The Horn"
- 2011 "Chung Kuo"
- 2011 "The Horn"
- 2012 "Praxia"
- 2012 "Stratosphere"
- 2014 "Moroccan Roll" in collaboration with Loud and Domestic
- 2014 "Ricochet"
- 2014 "Humans"
- 2015 "Before the Storm"
- 2015 "Ultrafoxx"
- 2016 "Firebird"
- 2017 "Curve Bender"

=== Remixes ===
- 1993 Art of Trance - "Deeper than Deep" (as Poltergeist)
- 1994 Velocity - "Lust"
- 1998 The Young Braves - "Warriors Groove" (as Poltergeist)
- 1999 Quietman - "Tranquil"
- 1999 Yello vs. Hardfloor - "Vicious Games" - UK #88
- 2001 Moogwai - "The Labyrinth" (as Vicious Circles)
- 2002 Indiana - "Do You Hear Me?"
- 2002 John Occlusion vs. Johen - "Psycho Drums"
- 2003 Jan Johnston - "Calling Your Name"
- 2004 Tekara - "Wanna Be an Angel"
- 2011 Steve Jablonsky - "Arrival to Earth" (with Exist and Arjen van der Hoek)

== See also ==
- List of music artists and bands from London
