= Platipus Records =

British trance music record label

- Founded: 1993
- Founder: Simon Berry
- Status: Merged in 2010
- Genre: Trance music
- Country of origin: UK
- Location: London
- Official website: Official site

Platipus Records was a British trance music record label that was based in London, England. It was founded in 1993 by Simon Berry, and early releases included Union Jack and Art of Trance. Later, the label included artists like Dawnseekers and Quietman. Sublabels included Gekko and Platipus Euro. Platipus Records Ltd ceased trading in 2010. Berry and the label's artists relaunched under the Porcupine Records label, but this was superseded by the founding of Platipus Music at the end of 2011.

== History ==
It was founded in 1993 by Simon Berry. The early releases were almost exclusively limited to Berry's various projects, including Union Jack, Clanger, and Art of Trance. Later, the label included artists like Dawnseekers and Quietman. Some of their most famous releases were the hits "Anomaly (Calling Your Name)" by BT, "Robert Miles – Children", and DJ Taylor, "Red Herring" and "Two Full Moons and a Trout" by Union Jack, and "Air" by Albion. Because of the success of "Calling Your Name" and "Madagascar" by Art of Trance in 1999, the label started to take on a more epic trance style, in stark contrast to their early releases of psychedelic and acid trance. They also featured many releases from Pob.

During the next few years the sublabels Gekko and Platipus Euro were established, showcasing more progressive and uplifting styles, respectively. Artists featured on Platipus Euro include Neo & Farina and RAH. Gekko releases tribal and techno-ish "flavours" of trance, and is unrelated to Disco Gekko Records.

Platipus Records Ltd ceased trading in April 2010, 17 years after being founded. Initially, Simon Berry and the label's artists relaunched under the 'Porcupine Records' label, but this was superseded by the founding 'Platipus Music' at the end of 2011.

== Artists ==
Platipus Records

- Albion
- AMbassador
- Art of Trance
- BT
- Clanger
- Dawnseekers
- Innate
- Kansai
- L.S.G.
- Moogwai
- Neo & Farina
- Nicely
- Paragliders
- Pob
- Poltergeist
- Quietman
- S.O.L.
- Technossomy
- Terra Ferma
- Union Jack
- Z2
- RAH

== Discography ==
Cat #	Artist	Title	Year
PLAT 01	Art of Trance	Deeper Than Deep EP	1993
PLAT 02	Poltergeist	Vicious Circles	1993
PLAT 03	Nicely	A Problem Joe Nicely EP	1993
PLAT 04	Art of Trance	The Colours EP	1993
PLAT 05	Art of Trance	Gloria	1993
PLAT 06	Union Jack	Two Full Moons and A Trout / Lollypop Man	1993
PLAT 07	Art of Trance	Cambodia	1994
PLAT 08	Technossomy	Chameleon / Elektron Bender	1994
PLAT 09	Union Jack	Catcus / Morning Glory	1994
PLAT 10	Various	Platipus Records Volume One	1994
PLAT 11	Quietman	Plastic Gourd / Tranquil	1994
PLAT 12	Art of Trance	Octopus	1995
PLAT 13	Poltergeist	Vicious Circles (Remixes)	1995
PLAT 14	Union Jack	Red Herring / There Will Be No Armageddon	1995
PLAT 15	Union Jack	There Will Be No Armageddon	1995
PLAT 16	Salamander	Tempest	1995
PLAT 17	Art of Trance	Octopus	1995
PLAT 18	Robert Miles	Children	1995
PLAT 19	Catalyst	What? / Stare	1995
PLAT 20	Various	Platipus Records Volume Two	1995
PLAT 21	Terra Ferma	Floating / The Scream	1996
PLAT 22	Virtualmismo	Last Train to Universe	1996
PLAT 23	Universal State of Mind	All Because of You	1996
PLAT 24	Libra Presents Taylor	Anomaly – Calling Your Name	1996
PLAT 25	Art of Trance	Wildlife on One	1996
PLAT 26	Quietman	Now & Zen	1997
PLAT 27	Art of Trance	Kaleidoscope	1997
PLAT 28	L.S.G.	Hidden Sun of Venus	1997
PLAT 29	Terra Ferma	Lunar Sunrise / Visions	1997
PLAT 30	Terra Ferma	Turtle Crossing	1997
PLAT 31	Pob feat. X-Avia	The Awakening	1997
PLAT 32	Loveclub	The Journey	1997
PLAT 33	Clanger	Seadog	1997
PLAT 34	Chromium	Chrome	1997
PLAT 35	Various	Platipus Records Volume Three	1997
PLAT 36	Union Jack	Cockroach / Yeti	1997
PLAT 37	Quietman	The Sleeper	1998
PLAT 38	Albion	Air	1998
PLAT 39	Pob	Boiler	1998
PLAT 40	Quietman	Shhhh	1998
PLAT 41	Conscious	Northern Lights	1998
PLAT 42	Union Jack	Two Full Moons and A Trout (Remixes)	1998
PLAT 43	Art of Trance	Madagasga	1998
PLAT 44	Quietman	Now & Zen / Celestial Body (Remixes)	1998
PLAT 45	Various	A.R.C. – Artist Remix Collection	1998
PLAT 46	Terra Ferma feat. I-Ching	Obelix	1998
PLAT 47	Humate	3.1	1998
PLAT 48	Narcotik	Blue / Twelve Miles	1998
PLAT 49			
PLAT 50	Various	Platipus Records Volume Four	1998
PLAT 51	S.O.L.	Pollenflug	1998
PLAT 52	Yello vs. Hardfloor	Vicious Games	1999
PLAT 53	Yello vs. Hardfloor	Vicious Games (Promo)	1999
PLAT 54	I-Ching feat. Patrick Reid	Soulstorm / Ways of Love	1999
PLAT 55	Art of Trance	Easter Island	1999
PLAT 56	Libra Presents Taylor	Anomaly – Calling Your Name (Remixes)	2000
PLAT 57	Moogwai	A Night Out / Moogwai	1999
PLAT 58	Art of Trance	Madagascar (Remixes)	1999
PLAT 59	S.O.L.	Quantensprung 1 / Solaris 1 & 2	1999
PLAT 60	Art of Trance	Voice of Earth	1999
PLAT 61	Art of Trance feat. Caroline Lavelle	Breathe	1999
PLAT 62	AMbassador	The Fade	1999
PLAT 63	Pob feat. Patrick Reid	Bluebottle / Fly	1999
PLAT 64			
PLAT 65	Various	Platipus Records Volume Five	1999
PLAT 66	Various	The Best of Platipus (Promo)	1999
PLAT 67	Z2	I Want You	2000
PLAT 68	Terra Ferma feat. Katie Ashley	Don't Be Afraid / Teeth of the Jungle	1999
PLAT 69	AMbassador	One of These Days	1999
PLAT 70	Various	The Best of Platipus	1999
PLAT 71	Moogwai	Viola / Keo	2000
PLAT 72	Terra Ferma	The Wolf	2000
PLAT 73	Albion	Air 2000	2000
PLAT 74	Paragliders	Lithium	2000
PLAT 75	Terra Ferma	The Adventures Of...	2000
PLAT 76	Art of Trance	Breathe	2000
PLAT 77	Dawnseekers	Gothic Dream	2000
PLAT 78	Pob	Waah!	2000
PLAT 79	Pink Elln & Atom Heart	Elektroniikkaa	2000
PLAT 80	Various	Platipus Six	2000
PLAT 81	Innate	Changes	2000
PLAT 82	Vicious Circles	Vicious Circles (Remixes)	2000
PLAT 83	Moogwai	The Labyrinth	2001
PLAT 84	Art of Trance	Monsoon	2000
PLAT 85	Pob	Essence	2001
PLAT 86	Praha Presents Xian	Pachinko	2001
PLAT 87	Steve Gibbs	Electronicat	2001
PLAT 88	Star	Rock Rose	2001
PLAT 89	Art of Trance	Killamanjaro	2001
PLAT 90	Various	Platipus Seven	2001
PLAT 91	Pob + Boyd	Luna	2001
PLAT 92	Indiana	Do You Hear Me	2002
PLAT 93	Leama	Melodica	2002
PLAT 94	Adam Dived	Into Sea / Headfirst	2002
PLAT 95	Various	Widescreen:16:9:V1	2002
PLAT 96	Indiana	In My Veins	2002
PLAT 97	Patrick Reid	Goose	2002
PLAT 98	Art of Trance	Love Washes Over	2002
PLAT 99	Jamnesia	She's My Friend / Get Busy	2002
PLAT 100	Z2	I Want You	2002
PLAT 100	Various	Platipus 10 Squared	2002
PLAT 100	Art of Trance	Madagascar (Remixes Promo)	2002
PLAT 101	Pob	The Essence / Today	2002
PLAT 102	Art of Trance	Madagascar (Remixes)	2002
PLAT 103	Jan Johnston	Calling Your Name	2003
PLAT 104	John Occlusion vs. Johen	Psycho Drums	2002
PLAT 105	Various	Platipus Eight	2002
PLAT 106	Rouge	Retro Piano	2002
PLAT 107	Mona Lisa Overdrive	Born to Synthesize	2002
PLAT 108	Altitude	Tears in the Rain / Marrakech	2002
PLAT 109	Kansai	Rococco	2003
PLAT 110	Altitude	The Art of Chill	2003
PLAT 111	Moogwai	Neon	2003
PLAT 112	Kansai	Remember This Night	2003
PLAT 113	Greg Murray	I Feel Loved	2003
PLAT 114	Altitude	Silence Is Loud	2003
PLAT 115	Various	Platipus Nine	2004
PLAT 116	Tekara feat. Xan	Wanna Be An Angel	2004
PLAT 117	Greg Murray	Ursa Majoris	2004
PLAT 118	Art of Trance vs. Pob	Turkish Bizarre	2004
PLAT 119	Neo & Farina	The Key (Alba Rossa)	2004
PLAT 120	Moogwai	5 Wishes & More	2004
PLAT 121	Art of Trance	Mongoose	2004
PLAT 122	Moogwai	Viola 2005	2005
PLAT 123	Art of Trance	Madagascar / Monsoon	2005
PLAT 124	Tek^tonik	Shine	2005
PLAT 125	Art of Trance	Tales of the Unexpected	2005
PLAT 126	Union Jack	Two Full Moons and a Trout 2006	2006
PLAT 127	Art of Trance feat. Natacha Atlas	Persia	2006
PLAT 128	Art of Trance	Madagascar 2009	2009
PLAT 129	Art of Trance	Swarm	2009
PLAT 130	Jon Hopkins	The Art of Chill Vol. 2	2005
PLAT 131	Union Jack	Papillon	2009
PLAT 132	Spooky	Eypes Mouth	2009
PLAT 133	Union Jack	Funnelweb	2009
PLAT 134	Union Jack	Triclops	2009
PLAT 135	Luke Chable & Kosmas Epsilon	Addicted	2006
PLAT 136	Union Jack	Pylon Pigs Club EP	2009
PLAT 140	Various	Platipus Ten	2006
PLAT 145	Simon Berry	Tales of the Unexpected Chapter 2	2006
PLAT 150	System 7	The Art of Chill 3	2006
PLAT 155	Simon Berry	The Big Freeze Vol. 1	2006
PLAT 160	The Orb	The Art of Chill 4	2007
PLAT 165	Gui Boratto	Addicted Vol. 2	2007
PLAT 170	Bliss	The Big Freeze Vol. 2	2008
PLAT 175	Pathaan	Globetronica	2008
PLAT 180	Hardfloor	Tales of the Unexpected Chapter 3	2008
PLAT 185	Bent	The Art of Chill 5	2008
PLAT 190	Amorphous Androgynous	A Monstrous Psychedelic Bubble Vol. 1	2008
PLAT 195	Chris Coco	The Big Freeze Vol. 3	2008
PLAT 200	Pathaan	Globetronica 2	2009
PLAT 205	Spooky	Tales of the Unexpected 4	2009
PLAT 210	Art of Trance	Retrospective	2009
PLAT 215	Amorphous Androgynous	A Monstrous Psychedelic Bubble Vol. 2	2009
PLAT 220	Union Jack	Pylon Pigs	2009
PLAT 225	I Monster	The Art of Chill 6	2009

== See also ==
- Lists of record labels
- List of electronic music record labels
