= Magik Seven: Live in Los Angeles =

Compilation album by DJ Tiësto
- Released: May 17, 2001 (Netherlands)
- Recorded: 2001
- Venue: Mayan Theater (Los Angeles, CA)
- Genre: Trance
- Length: 77:08
- Label: Black Hole
- Producer: Tiësto

DJ Tiësto chronology
Revolution (2001)	Magik Seven: Live in Los Angeles (2001)	In Search of Sunrise 3: Panama (2002)

Magik Seven: Live in Los Angeles is the seventh and final album in the Magik series by trance DJ and producer Tiësto, released in 2001 in the Netherlands. As with the rest of the Magik series, the album is a live turntable mix.

== Track listing ==
1. The Auranaut – "People Want to Be Needed" – 7:44
2. Three Drives – "Sunset on Ibiza" – 3:45
3. Schiller – "Das Glockenspiel" [Humate remix] – 3:33
4. Ballroom – "Come Along!" [Original mix] – 5:51 (Mislabeled as Ballroom – "Come Along!" [Chrome remix])
5. Insigma – "Open Your Eyes" [Original Insigma mix] – 5:51
6. Jan Johnston – "Flesh" [DJ Tiësto mix] – 6:09
7. Riva – "Stringer" – 5:15
8. M.I.K.E. – "Sunrise at Palamos" – 4:19
9. Push – "Strange World" [2000 remake] – 4:14
10. Utah Saints – "Lost Vagueness" [Oliver Lieb's main mix] – 4:05
11. DJ Arabesque – "The Vision" [Bass Control] – 4:12
12. DJ Tiësto – "Flight 643" – 5:31
13. The Green Martian – "Industry" – 4:05
14. Planisphere – "Moonshine" – 6:19
15. CJ Bolland – "The Prophet" – 5:37
