= Nitzhonot =

Subgenre of Goa trance

- Native name: נצחונות
- Stylistic origins: Trance; EBM; psychedelic rock; acid house; new beat; Goa trance
- Cultural origins: Mid-1990s, Israel

Nitzhonot (Hebrew: נצחונות, "victories") is a derivate of Goa trance that emerged during the mid-late 1990s in Israel.

== Overview ==
Nitzhonot blends hard pulsating kicks, sometimes referred to as "laserkicks", with the Eastern melodies typical for Indian Goa trance from 1996 and 1997. The tracks are usually in a range of 145–155 BPM, though they can reach up to 170 BPM.

At the height of its popularity, nitzhonot reached mainstream success in Israel. The most notable artist from this genre is Eyal Barkan, who released his album Good Morning Israel in 1998. It became the first trance record that achieved gold status in its home country, selling more than 20,000 copies (bootleg versions accounted for 80,000). Other artists from Greece and Israel would also gain popularity that year. In the 2000s, Astrix emerged as another notable Israeli nitzhonot artist.

Before most artists in Israel changed their direction to Full On, artists in Greece rode the tide. At the beginning of the new millennium, nitzhonot, now renamed as uplifting trance (not to be confused with epic trance, also known as "uplifting trance"), would stand up again, rising in popularity. Notable early Greek acts included Cyan, Cherouvim, Star Children, Darma, Space Odyssey, and Dementia.

Uplifting uses Phrygian scales, brassy leads and louder kicks than other forms of nitzhonot.

The uplifting scene in Greece was relatively silent during the late 2000s, but this period also marked the renewed popularity of nitzhonot in a new form known as nitzhogoa. This style blends nitzhonot melodies, fast BPMs, and laserkicks with a highly psychedelic atmosphere. Notable artists include Agneton, Goalien, and Filipe Santos, associated with the label Sita Records, which specialises in nitzhogoa.
