= Melkweg =

Music venue and cultural centre in Amsterdam

Coordinates: 52°21′53″N 4°52′53″E

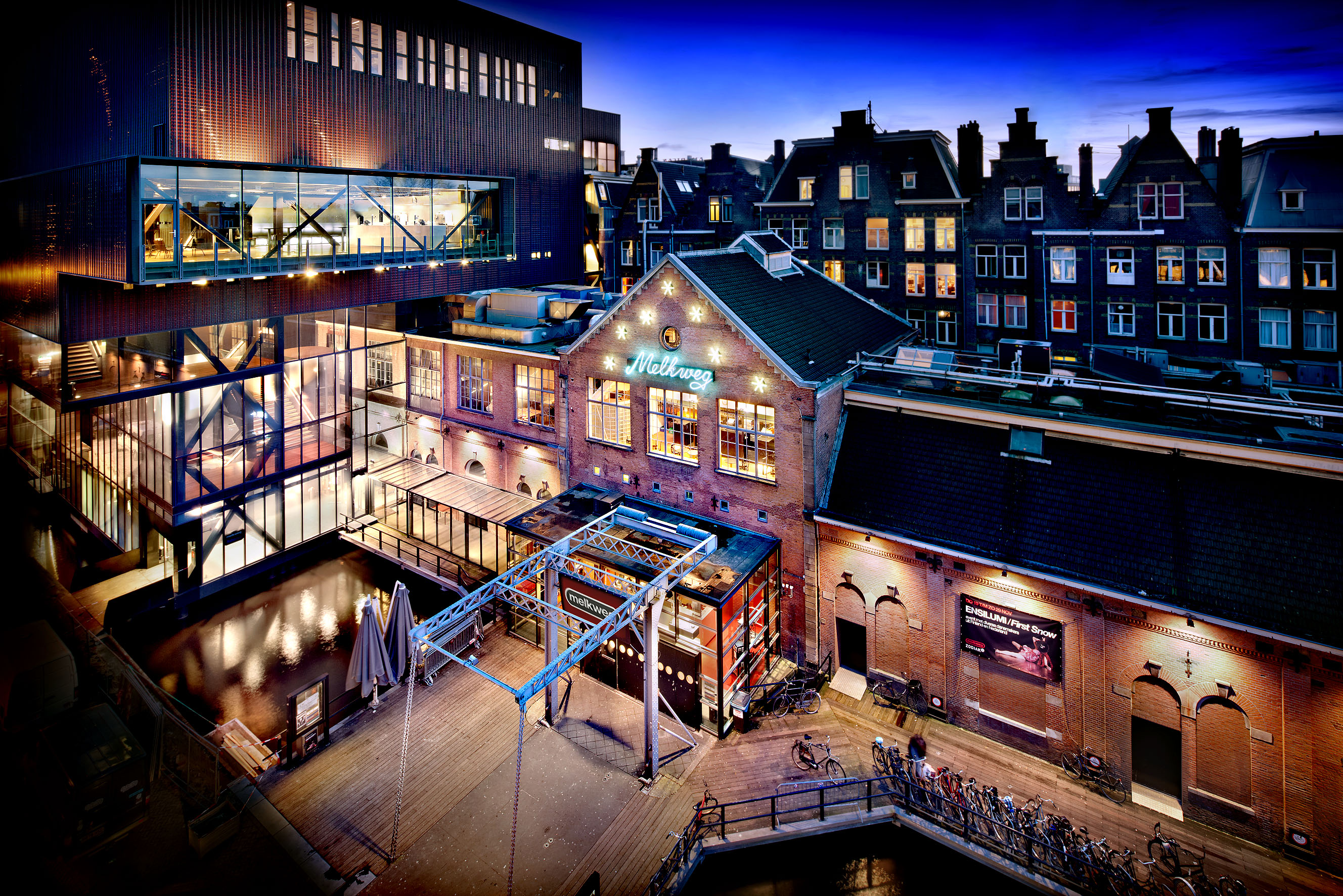
- Melkweg, Amsterdam

- Location within Amsterdam

General information
- Location: Amsterdam, Netherlands, Lijnbaansgracht 234a
- Opened: July 17, 1970; 56 years ago

Design and construction
- Known for: Music venue

Website
- www.melkweg.nl

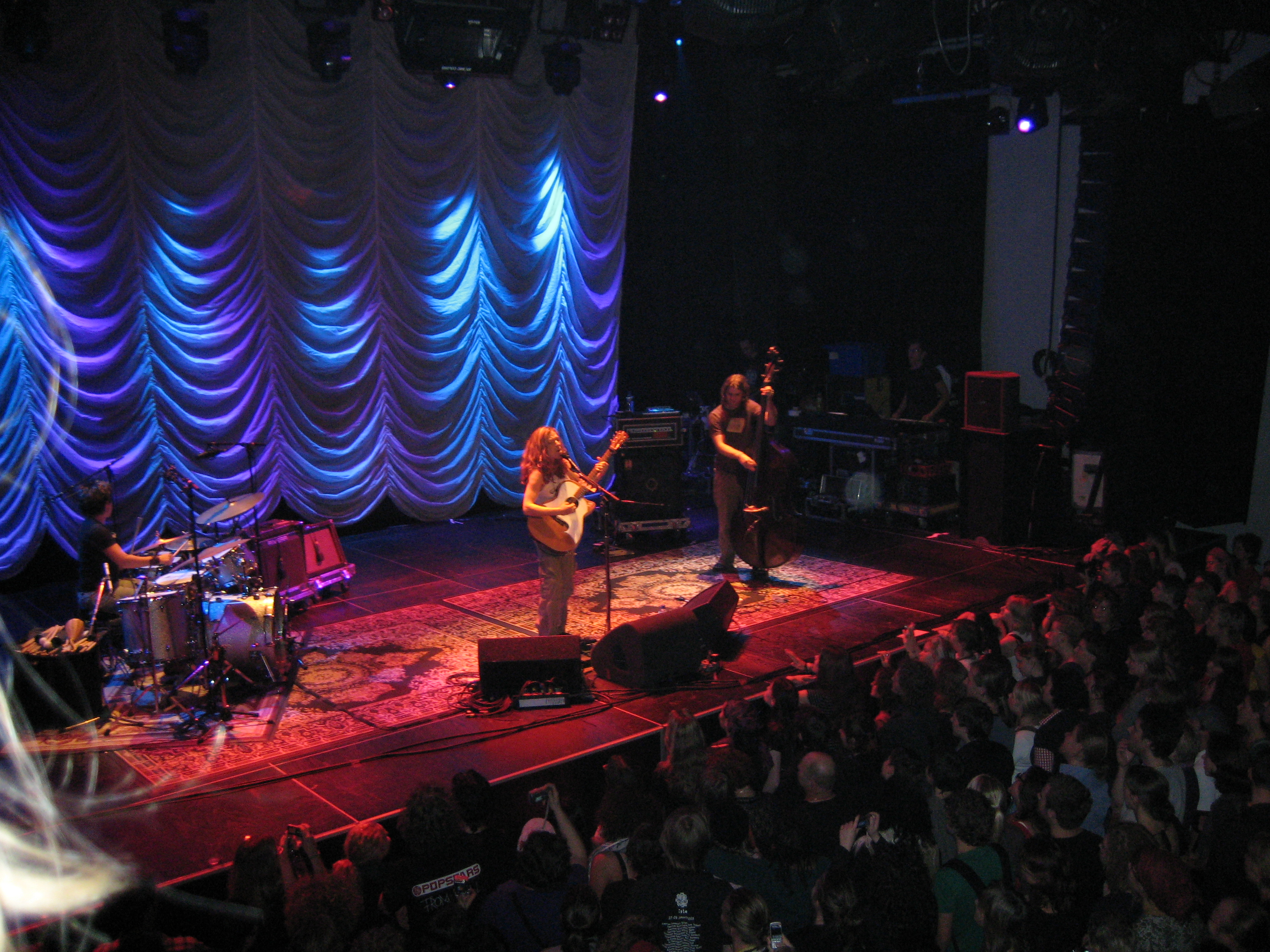
Ani DiFranco during her 2007 concert

Melkweg (Dutch for "Milky Way") is a music venue and cultural center on Lijnbaansgracht, near Leidseplein in Amsterdam, Netherlands. It is housed in a former dairy and includes four music halls as well as a cinema, a restaurant and an exhibition space. It is operated by a nonprofit organisation founded in 1970.

== History ==
The building originally housed a sugar refinery built in the 19th century. In 1920, OVVV bought the factory and used it as a milk factory until it closed in 1969. The building was closed for a year, but reopened by Cor Schlösser and others as a cultural center, with its first event on July 17, 1970. It was only open for the summer; it featured a café, a restaurant and one hall for music and theatre. This was a success: Melkweg reopened in the summer of 1971 and 1972 before becoming a year-round venue in 1973. In the 1980s, it became more focused on live music. In 1985, a photo gallery opened. In 1995, The Max opened, first with a capacity of 1,000 people, expanded to 1,500 in 2007. By 2010, the venue was hosting 400,000 guests annually and was estimated to have hosted 9 million guests since it opened.

=== Notable events ===
- In October 1980, U2 played their first concert outside of Ireland and the United Kingdom at the Melkweg.
- In October 1981, The Grateful Dead played two unscheduled shows at the venue using borrowed instruments.
- Nirvana played at the venue in November 1989, before they were famous.
- In 1994, Rammstein, then an unknown newly formed band, played a show at the venue that was attended by 40 people.
- The live turntable mix of Tiësto's performance here on June 23, 2000, was recorded for his album Magik Six: Live in Amsterdam, a part of the Magik series.
- In 2011, Prince played a surprise show at the venue, with tickets going on sale one hour before the show started.
- In 2026, DJ HI.Ø made his debut in the Netherlands during a collaboration event at Melkweg in occasion of the Amsterdam 2026 World Pride.

== In popular culture ==
=== Songs referencing the Melkweg ===
- "Euro-Trash Girl" by Cracker
- "Infectious" by Lagwagon
- "Prag Vec at the Melkweg" by Half Man Half Biscuit
- "Under the Milky Way" by The Church

=== Albums recorded at the Melkweg ===
- Live from the Milky Way (1995) by Heather Nova
- Performance (1988) by Spacemen 3
- Magik Six: Live in Amsterdam (2000) by Tiësto
- Live at Melkweg (2001) by Frank Black and the Catholics
- Ana! Live in Amsterdam (2005) by Ana Popović
- L-1VE (2018) by Haken
- Melkweg (2019) by Jameszoo with Metropole Orkest

== Halls ==
The venue has six halls:

- The Max (capacity: 1,500; opened in 1995, renovated in 2007), the largest room, hosts the biggest music acts and is also used for parties, meetings and film projections.
- The Old Hall (Oude Zaal) (capacity: 700) is the oldest concert hall of the venue, also the only one until the opening of "The Max" in 1995.
- The Rabo Hall (Rabozaal) (capacity: 1,400) is in a separate building and mostly hosts film projections or theater plays.
- The Theater Hall (Theaterzaal) (capacity: 90–130) is a small hall used for smaller artists and theatre plays.
- The Cinema (capacity: 90) is a private film projection hall.
- The Exhibition space (Expo) is used for art exhibitions.
