= There Will Be No Armageddon =

Studio album by Union Jack
- Released: July 3, 1995
- Genre: Ambient trance, electronica
- Length: 74:49
- Label: Platipus Records/K7 Studio

Professional ratings
Review scores
Source	Rating
Allmusic	4.5/5 stars
Muzik	2/5 stars

There Will Be No Armageddon is an early acid trance album by Union Jack. The songs were composed in the early 1990s and the album was released by Platipus Records in 1995. It was Union Jack's first studio album and first release on compact disc. It was released again in August 2001 by K7 Studio. Two of the songs on this album, "Two Full Moons and a Trout" and "Red Herring", were major hits in the mid-1990s European dance scene. Most of the songs in this album incorporate a variety of acid sounds. "Red Herring" introduces a loop of a distorted female vocal sample.

"Fromage Frais" is a trance version of Prelude No. 1 from the Well Tempered Clavier composed by Johann Sebastian Bach.

From the album jacket:

"Despite possible connotations with our name, we in fact draw our inspiration from an ancient spiritual Britain. Our aim is to make a positive association with an old name, and promote the unity of all...Long ago the Union Jack banner was created as a representation of something positive for this nation. Let go of the negative feelings about our history. It was the past, this is the future - There Will Be No Armageddon."

== Track listing ==
No.	Title	Length
1.	"Red Herring"	8:36
2.	"Cactus"	9:42
3.	"Water Drums"	9:06
4.	"Two Full Moons and a Trout (14" mix)"	7:57
5.	"No Life Can Survive Here"	5:56
6.	"Fromage Frais"	6:37
7.	"Lollipop Man"	7:12
8.	"There Will Be No Armageddon"	10:13
9.	"Toucan"	8:19
10.	"Epilogue"	1:11
