= Cass & Slide =

British music production duo

Cass & Slide is a British trance duo, consisting of Cass Cutbush and Peter Martin. Cass founded the record label Fire with Lee Burridge in 2000. Cass & Slide released several singles on Fire and its sublabel, Fire 999. These included remixes of songs from the films Gladiator and The Italian Job. They also released original singles on labels such as Additive Records and EQ [Grey]. Since the demise of Fire in 2003, Cass opened the new record label Sabotage Systems.

Their track "Perception" was featured on numerous compilation albums including Tiësto's In Search of Sunrise 2. More recently in 2010, it was covered by Markus Schulz to include the vocals of Justine Suissa.

Cass & Slide were featured on the BBC Radio 1 show, The Essential Mix, on 23 December 2001.
