= Eyal Barkan =

Israeli trance/nitzhonot producer

- Born: 1970; Haifa, Israel
- Genres: Goa Trance, Nitzhonot, Psychedelic Trance
- Occupations: DJ, Producer
- Years active: 1998 – Present
- Labels: G.M.I Records, Hed Artzi, Black Hole Recordings

Eyal Barkan (Hebrew: אייל ברקן, born in 1970 in Haifa) is an Israeli trance/nitzhonot producer. He has collaborated with Yahel. In 2003 he was reported to be Israel's top-selling trance DJ, with sales of over 150,000 albums. His albums have reached gold status in Israel. His 1998 hit Good Morning Israel was the first trance song to achieve platinum status in Israel.

His 2003 album V.I.P. was released by Tiësto's Black Hole Records. In 2003 it was reported that cell phone ringtones based on Barkan's music achieved 200,000 downloads in Europe.

Barkan has also released music with his brother Oren as the duo Reverse Psychology. In 2006 the brothers started Startcut, a video distribution company.

== Discography ==
=== Albums ===
- Good Morning Israel (1998), Eyal Barkan Music
- Crazy Summer (1999), Hed Arzi Music - album credited to Eyal Barkan, but all tracks credited to Reverse Psychology
- Mr. Club Trance (2000), Eyal Barkan Records/Hed Arzi Music - most tracks credited to Reverse Psychology
- On-Line (2002), Hed Arzi Music
- V.I.P. (2003), Black Hole/In Trance We Trust

=== Singles ===
- "Crazy Summer" (radio edit) (1999), Eyal Barkan Records/Good Morning Israel/Hed Arzi Music
- "Viagra" (radio edit) (2000), Eyal Barkan Records/Good Morning Israel
- "Voyage" (2000), In Trance We Trust - Yahel & Eyal Barkan
- "Revolution" (2002), In Trance We Trust - Eyal Barkan & A-Force
- Album Sampler (2003), In Trance We Trust
