= Serenade for Thirteen Wind Instruments =

Serenade for Thirteen Wind Instruments may refer to:

- Serenade No. 10 for winds in B flat major, K. 361/370a by Wolfgang Amadeus Mozart.
- Serenade in E-flat major for 13 wind instruments, Op. 7 by Richard Strauss.

== See also ==
- Serenade for Wind Instruments (disambiguation)
