= Union Jack (band) =

English trance music duo

Union Jack is a trance music collaboration between Simon Berry and Claudio Giussani, a trance music producer from England. The duo has focused on acid and tech trance and has been closely associated with the Platipus record label, which was founded by Berry.

== History ==
Disillusioned by the state of the early 1990s music industry, Berry and Giussani joined forces in 1993, firstly remixing Nicely's "Away The Throttle Pedal Stop" before releasing their seminal first single, "Two Full Moons and A Trout". Their following single, "Cactus", reinforced their reputation before the release of their first album There Will Be No Armageddon. Enjoyable both at home and on the dance floor, it contained their third single, "Red Herring", which was a popular club track in the 1990s.

In 2008, after a 7-year hiatus, Union Jack (this time featuring a new production partner, Paul Brogden aka POB of Seismic Records) recommenced with a career spanning live set at the Ultra Music Festival, taking in all their classic tracks. Following the success of that live date the pair entered the studio to work on Pylon Pigs, Union Jack's first new material in eleven years.

== Discography ==
- Two Full Moons & A Trout (CD, Rising High Records, 1994)
- Red Herring (Remixes) (CD, Rising High Records, 1995)
- There Will Be No Armageddon (CD, Platipus Records, 1995)
- Cockroach / Yeti (CD, Platipus Records, 1997)
- Pylon Pigs (CD, Platipus Records, 2009)
