= Space Age 1.0 =

Compilation album by Tiësto
- Released: February 22, 1998
- Recorded: 1998
- Genre: Electronic, techno
- Length: 73:46
- Label: Black Hole
- Producer: Tiësto

Tiësto chronology
| Global Clubbing: Netherlands (1998) | Space Age 1.0 (1998) | Magik Two: Story of the Fall (1998) |

Space Age 1.0 is a compilation album by Tiësto and the first in the Space Age releases.

== Track listing ==
Disc 1
| No. | Title | Length |
|---|---|---|
| 1. | "Bamboo Lounge - Clone" | 5:27 |
| 2. | "Jan Driver - Filter" | 3:06 |
| 3. | "DJ Slug - Forerunner (Part 1)" | 4:51 |
| 4. | "Canyon - Twighlight" | 4:23 |
| 5. | "Blue Rock - The Bell EP (The Rock)" | 4:09 |
| 6. | "TNT Pres. Casa Royale - We All Need Love (Continuous Cool Mix)" | 5:18 |
| 7. | "Little Big Man - Moving Mars" | 4:29 |
| 8. | "Mikerobenics - Witchride" | 5:39 |
| 9. | "16C+ - Guarantee" | 5:15 |
| 10. | "Wild Bunch - Groovelounge" | 4:48 |
| 11. | "Tiësto, Montana & Storm - Gimme Some Sugar" | 5:01 |
| 12. | "Lex - Rack 19" | 3:25 |
| 13. | "Marco Bailey - Sweetbox (Silver & Kash Numba Remix)" | 4:47 |
| 14. | "S.H.A.R.P. 2 - Perception 4" | 4:20 |
| 15. | "Drumfire - Flying Squirrel Problem" | 5:28 |
| 16. | "Superspy - Sumo V2" | 3:20 |

== Credits ==
- Artwork By Design and Concept By - Arny Bink
- DJ Mix Compiled By - Tiësto
- Mastered By - Barney Broomer
