= Ave Maria (Bach/Gounod) =

Composition by Bach and Gounod

- Art song by Bach/Gounod
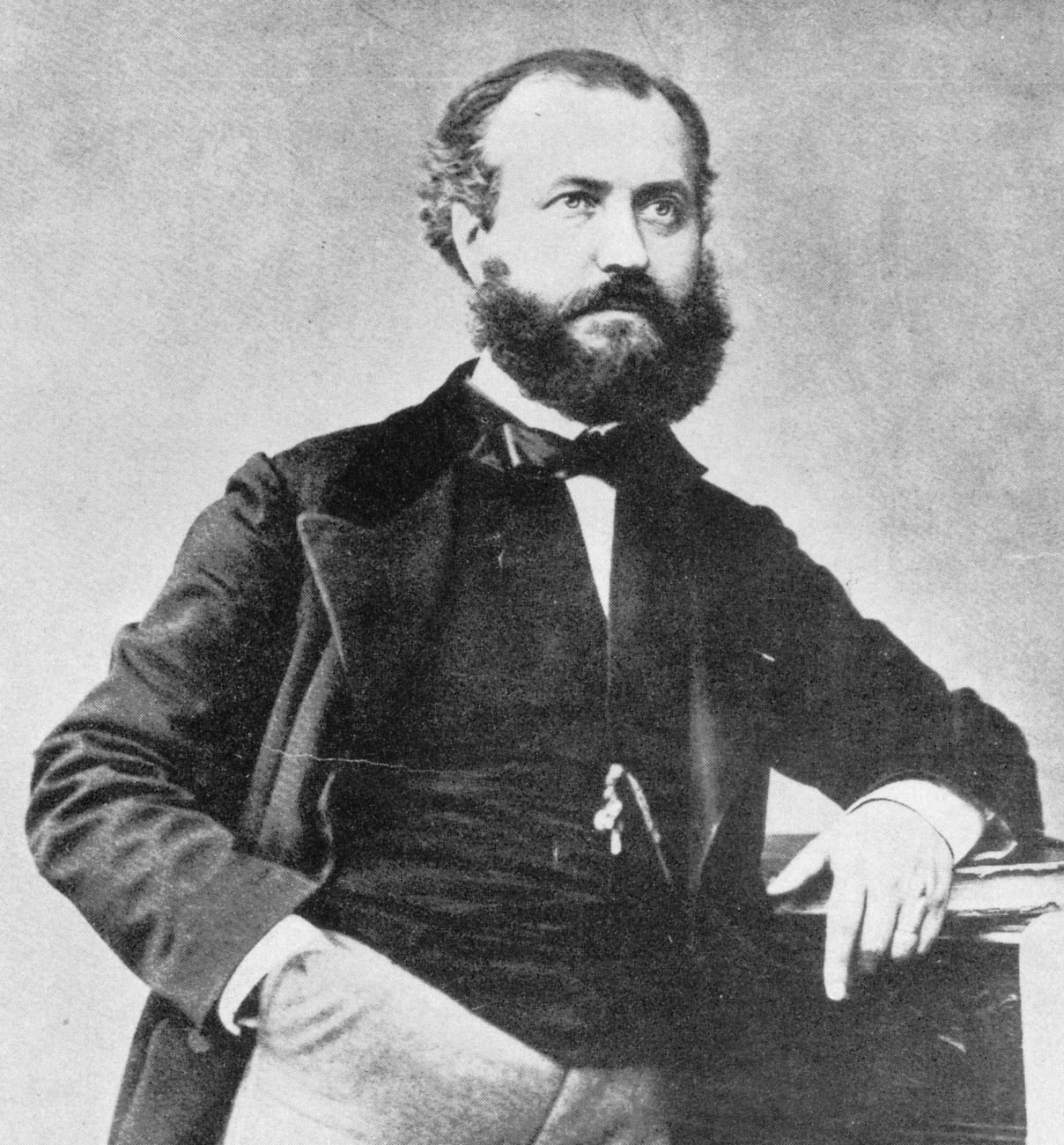
- Charles Gounod in 1859
- Native name: Méditation sur le Premier Prélude de Piano de S. Bach
- Key: C major
- Text: Ave Maria
- Language: Latin
- Based on: Bach's Prelude No. 1, BWV 846
- Published: 1853 (French text); 1859 (Latin text)
- Scoring: voice; piano

"Ave Maria" is a setting of the Latin prayer Ave Maria, originally published in 1853 as "Méditation sur le 1er prélude de piano de S. Bach". The piece consists of a melody by the French Romantic composer Charles Gounod that he superimposed over an only very slightly changed version of Bach's Prelude No. 1 in C major, BWV 846, from Book I of his The Well-Tempered Clavier, 1722. The 1853 publication has the superimposed melody for solo violin, but it is the 1859 version arranged for voice with the Latin "Ave Maria" which became popular.

== History ==
Gounod improvised the melody, and his future father-in-law Pierre-Joseph-Guillaume Zimmerman transcribed the improvisation and in 1853 made an arrangement for violin (or cello) with piano and harmonium. The same year it appeared with the words of Alphonse de Lamartine's poem "Le livre de la vie" ("The Book of Life"). In 1859, Jacques-Léopold Heugel published a version with the familiar Latin text. The version of Bach's prelude used by Gounod includes the "Schwencke measure" (m.23), a measure allegedly added by Christian Friedrich Gottlieb Schwencke in an attempt to correct what he or someone else erroneously deemed a "faulty" progression, even though this sort of progression was standard in Bach's music.

Alongside Schubert's "Ave Maria", the Bach/Gounod "Ave Maria" has become a fixture at funerals, weddings, and quinceañeras. There are many different instrumental arrangements including for violin and guitar, string quartet, piano solo, cello, and trombone. Opera singers, such as Nellie Melba, Franco Corelli and Luciano Pavarotti, as well as choirs have recorded it hundreds of times during the twentieth century.

Later in his career, Gounod composed an unrelated setting of Ave Maria for a four-part SATB choir.

== Composition ==
Ave Maria
Arrangement for cello and piano, performed by John Michel

Ave Maria
Arrangement for violin and piano (1st time) and voice, violin and piano (2nd time), performed prior to 1930

Gounod based the work on Bach's prelude, which is a study in harmony in broken chords. He used the first four measure for a prelude, repeating them for the first entry of the voice. He used Bach's composition, in the version with an inserted measure after the original 22, the so-called Schwencke-measure which was common at the time. To this measure, the voice has a repeated expressive "Maria!". He added a tempo marking, Moderato, pedal markings for the pianist, and dynamic markings.

== Recordings ==
Alessandro Moreschi, one of the last castrato singers, performed "Ave Maria" and several other pieces on recordings for the Gramophone & Typewriter Company in the early 1900s.

Richard Clayderman made a recording of "Ave Maria" on his 1980 album Les Musiques de l'amour. He also recorded a more upbeat version as part of the track "Sentimental Medley" (done as a medley with Rossini's Il Barbiere di Siviglia overture and Albinoni's Adagio in G Minor) on his album Medley Concerto.

Noa (Achinoam Nini) performed her own lyrics for "Ave Maria" for Pope John Paul II at the Vatican in 1994.

In 2003, synthpop duo Erasure did a cover of the song, which was released as a B-side to their "Solsbury Hill" single.

A rendition by Yo-Yo Ma and Bobby McFerrin from their album Hush was used as the main theme in the 2017 Palme d'Or winning Swedish film The Square.

The piece also features as a recurring theme during Disney's A Christmas Carol (2009).
