= Trancemaster =

Trancemaster (Series)

Compilation album by VA
- Released: 1992-2012
- Genre: Trance music
- Label: Vision Soundcarriers

Trancemaster is a CD compilation series, issued by the label Vision Soundcarriers, a sub-label of Eurovision Soundcarriers.

== History ==
The series began in 1992 with 'Trancemaster Vol. 1', at a time when the genre of trance was in its infancy. As a result, early volumes contained a variety of genres, including ambient house, Goa trance and techno, as well as a sub-title (such as 'The Goa Gap' or 'Hardtrance Experience'), but gradually the series stabilized to become centred on the European trance sound.

The title of each volume was originally joined by a sub-title (such as 'The Goa Gap' or 'Hardtrance Experience'), but since its 24th volume each compilation has been marketed with its number in four figures (meaning Volume 24 became '2004').

The format of each volume has varied over the years. Initially each edition featured a single disc of 12" mix tracks, before double disc volumes began with 'Trancemaster 7 - The Future Watch'. Some volumes were released with a third, mixed CD. Early volumes were also released on vinyl. Typically around five volumes are released per year, with the series currently on its 76th volume.

In 2013 Vision soundcarriers announced that due to piracy the label would no longer release any new albums. Their domain vision-soundcarriers.de is currently available, and its last content can be found in the internet archive here: Former website before being removed
