= Theme from Norefjell =

Single by DJ Tiësto

from the album Magik Three: Far from Earth
- Released: 1999
- Recorded: 1999
- Studio: Norway
- Genre: Uplifting trance
- Length: 3:27 (Radio Edit); 6:24 (Magikal Remake)
- Label: Black Hole
- Songwriters: Tijs Verwest; Cor Fijneman
- Producers: DJ Tiësto; DJ Cor Fijneman

DJ Tiësto singles chronology
"The Tube" (1996)	"Theme from Norefjell" (1999)	"Sparkles" (1999)

"Theme from Norefjell" is an instrumental composition by Dutch disc jockey and producer DJ Tiësto. It was released in 1999 in the Netherlands. It was composed during a trip to Norway. The Magikal Remake was included on DJ Tiësto's compilation, Magik Three: Far from Earth. A remix of the track by DJ Jan and Christophe Chantzis can be found on Live at Innercity: Amsterdam RAI (1999) and Tiësto in Concert (2003).

== Track listing ==
12" / Digital Download (Netherlands)

1. "Theme From Norefjell" (Magikal Remake) - 6:24
2. "Theme From Norefjell" (DJ Jan & Christophe Chantzis Mix) - 5:26

CD (Netherlands)

1. "Theme From Norefjell" (Magikal Radio Edit) - 3:27
2. "Theme From Norefjell" (Magikal Remake) - 6:30
3. "Theme From Norefjell" (DJ Jan & Christophe Chantzis Mix) - 5:25

12" (US)

1. "Theme From Norefjell" (DJ Jan & Christophe Chantzis Mix) - 5:26
2. "Theme From Norefjell" (Lambert & Dimech Mix) - 7:56
3. "Theme From Norefjell" (DJ Tiësto's Magikal Remake) - 6:24
4. "Theme From Norefjell" (Aptness Remix) - 8:09

12" (UK)

1. "Theme From Norefjell" (Aptness Remix) - 8:09
2. "Theme From Norefjell" (Magikal Remake) - 6:24
3. "Theme From Norefjell" (Lambert & Dimech Mix) - 7:56
4. "Theme From Norefjell" (DJ Jan & Christophe Chantzis Mix) - 5:26

Digital download - DJ Cor Fijneman 2004 Remix (Netherlands)

1. "Theme From Norefjell" (DJ Cor Fijneman 2004 Remix) - 8:38

== Charts ==
Chart (1999)	Peak position
Norway (VG-lista)	15
UK Singles (OCC)	97
