= Magik (album series) =

Magik (Series)

Compilation album by DJ Tiësto
- Released: 1997–2001
- Genre: Trance
- Label: Black Hole Recordings

Magik is the title given to a trance mix-compilation series by Tiësto. The series, which comprises seven installments starting in 1997 and ending in 2001, was released by Tiësto on Black Hole Recordings. Each CD is a live turntable mix. Magik Four: A New Adventure (Black Hole CD 07) is the only CD that was also released in the Artist Profile Series. The first four Magik CDs were re-released in 2000 with new sleeves due to the unauthorized use of Patrick Woodroffe's artwork in the original releases.

== Installments ==
There have been seven installments in the Magik series.

- Magik One: First Flight (September 15, 1997)
- Magik Two: Story of the Fall (May 8, 1998)
- Magik Three: Far from Earth (October 14, 1998)
- Magik Four: A New Adventure (June 6, 1999)
- Magik Five: Heaven Beyond (February 3, 2000)
- Magik Six: Live in Amsterdam (July 17, 2000)
- Magik Seven: Live in Los Angeles (May 17, 2001)
