= Kamaya Painters =

Trance music project

- Origin: Netherlands
- Genres: Trance
- Years active: 1998–2000
- Label: Black Hole Recordings
- Members: Benno de Goeij; Tijs Verwest
- Website: www.tiesto.com www.bennodegoeij.com

Kamaya Painters was a trance project name used by Dutch DJs Tijs Verwest, better known as Tiësto, and Benno de Goeij, best known for his participation in the Rank 1 project.

== History ==
The first single was "Endless Wave" which was released in 1998 in conjunction with "Northern Spirit" which appeared on Magik Four: A New Adventure and "Outstream". It was released on Data Records and Planetary Consciousness in 1999, "Endless Wave" also included two remixes from Tiësto's song "Theme From Norefjell", another version features remixes from "Endless Wave" which was mixed in Global Clubbing: Netherlands and "Outstream" as a B-side. "Endless Wave" and the duo's next B-side "Cryptomnesia" were played in Live at Innercity: Amsterdam RAI.

In 1999, "Far From Over" became the next Kamaya Painters single with "Cryptomnesia" which was included in Magik Five: Heaven Beyond and "Soft Light" as B-sides. Reef Recordings was the label releasing the "Far From Over" remixes from Oliver Lieb and Wavestate in 2000. A 12" vinyl from Data Records was released in the United Kingdom which was published by Magdalena Melodies and Allure Muzik. In late 2000, "Wasteland" and "Summerbreeze" were released being the third and last single from the duo, "Wasteland" appeared in Tiësto's Magik Six: Live in Amsterdam. Since the late 2000s the duo has not released a new single under the Kamaya Painters alias, tracks like "Endless Wave" were re-released in 2004, "Far From Over" and "Wasteland" were re-released in 2007 followed by the compilation album Kamaya Painters - The Collected Works in 2008. The songs of Kamaya Painters also appear on a large number of Trance compilation albums, including the popular Trance radio show, A State of Trance by Armin Van Buuren and the Magik recordings series.

== Discography ==
=== Albums ===
Kamaya Painters - The Collected Works

Compilation album by Kamaya Painters
- Released: April 21, 2008
- Genre: Trance
- Label: Black Hole Recordings
- Producers: Benno de Goeij; Tijs Verwest

- 2008 "Kamaya Painters - The Collected Works" a tribute album compilation by Black Hole Recordings for Kamaya Painters.

Kamaya Painters - The Collected Works
No.	Title	Length
1.	"Endless Wave"	6:03
2.	"Endless Wave (Reversed Twister Remix)"	6:11
3.	"Endless Wave (Albion Remix)"	6:27
4.	"Far from Over"	5:54
5.	"Far from Over (Oliver Lieb Remix)"	8:50
6.	"Wasteland"	7:40
7.	"Wasteland (DJ Hitchhiker Remix)"	6:59
8.	"Summerbreeze"	6:30
9.	"Cryptomnesia"	7:08
10.	"Soft Light"	7:53
11.	"Outstream"	5:25
12.	"Northern Spirit"	6:26

=== Singles ===
- 1998 "Endless Wave / Northern Spirit / Outstream"
- 1999 "Endless Wave / Theme from Norefjell (Remixes)" it contains two remixes from Tiësto's song "Theme from Norefjell".
- 1999 "Far from Over / Cryptomnesia / Soft Light"
- 2000 "Wasteland / Summerbreeze"
