= Christian Friedrich Gottlieb Schwencke =

German composer and pianist (1767–1822)

- Born: 30 August 1767; Wachenhausen
- Died: 27 October 1822 (aged 55); Hamburg
- Education: Johanneum Hamburg; University of Leipzig; University of Halle
- Occupations: Pianist; Church musician; Director of music; Composer; Music editor
- Organizations: Johanneum Hamburg

Christian Friedrich Gottlieb Schwencke (30 August 1767 – 27 October 1822) was a German composer, pianist and editor of musical works. From 1789 to 1822, he was Kantor at the Johanneum and director of church music in Hamburg, succeeding Carl Philipp Emanuel Bach. He was an early publisher of The Well-Tempered Clavier by Bach's father, Johann Sebastian Bach.

== Life ==
Schwenke was born in Wachenhausen in the Harz mountains. His father Johann Gottlieb Schwencke was a military bassoonist and later a town musician in Hamburg. Christian Friedrich Gottlieb received musical education from him while attending the Johanneum and the Akademisches Gymnasium in Hamburg. In 1779, he performed for the first time as a pianist in a concert given by his father. He was a boy singer in the church music directed by Carl Philipp Emanuel Bach. After his voice broke, he was a piano accompanist there. He thus became acquainted with compositions by his father Johann Sebastian Bach. From 1782, Schwencke continued his musical studies with Johann Philipp Kirnberger and Friedrich Wilhelm Marpurg in Berlin. He also performed as a piano and organ virtuoso. From 1787, he studied mathematics at the University of Leipzig, and continued at the University of Halle the following year. On 1 October 1789, he was elected to succeed C. P. E. Bach as Kantor of the Johanneum and music director in Hamburg. However, his salary was significantly reduced compared to his predecessor's, as the council wanted to save money. The low financial resources of church music gave reason for Schwencke's repeated complaints. He held the office in Hamburg until his death in 1822 at the age of 55. (Note: Last residential address: Schwencke, C. F. G. Musikdirector, Plan no 123 P. 4, 1822, in Hamburgisches Adress-Buch at Staatsbibliothek Hamburg) The position of Kantor was not filled again.

== Work ==
Schwencke's compositions have survived only in part. He created cantatas and oratorios as well as instrumental music, two piano and one oboe concerto, six fugues for organ and piano and violin sonatas. His setting of the Lord's Prayer by Friedrich Gottlieb Klopstock, which was also performed at Klopstock's funeral, became nationally famous. He also set Klopstock's Der Frohsinn to music.

Schwencke owned several manuscript of Bach's works, and was an early publisher of his The Well-Tempered Clavier. In a manuscript of the work's first Prelude in C major that he made, and subsequently in the printed edition by N. Simrock, the composition includes an extra measure compared with Bach's autograph. It is unknown if Schwencke added this measure, or if he copied from now lost sources. Called the Schwencke measure, it has made its way in countless later editions, including the Ave Maria setting that Charles Gounod based on it.

Schwencke also edited other works by Bach and by George Frideric Handel. He promoted the music of Wolfgang Amadeus Mozart through several performances in Hamburg. He published his own arrangement of Mozart's Serenade No. 10 for oboe, violin, viola, cello, and keyboard.

From 1799, Schwencke was also a contributor to the Allgemeine musikalische Zeitung.

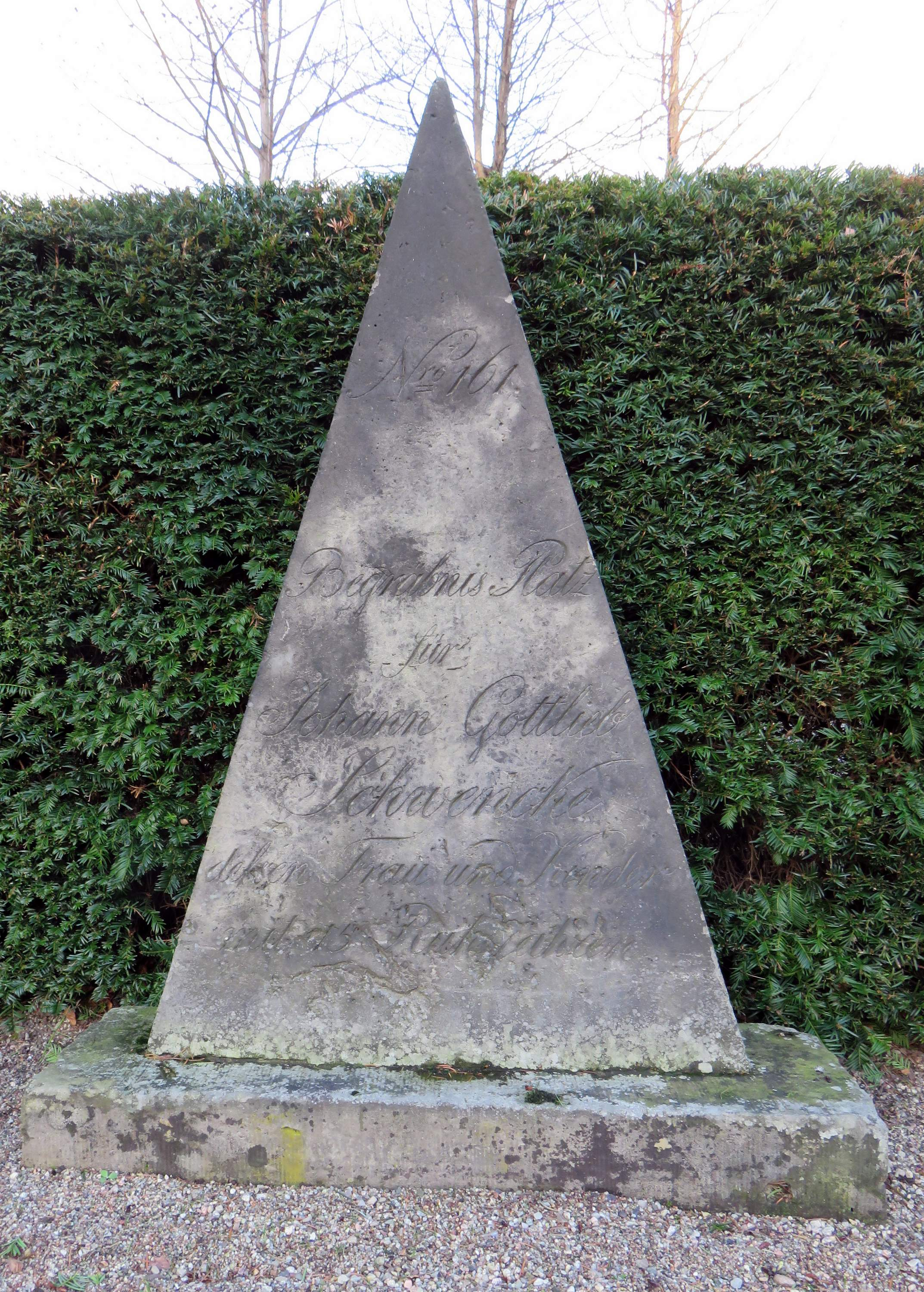
Family gravestone, Ohlsdorf Cemetery

His bequeathed library and "collection of musical materials from all subjects of musical art" was auctioned in August 1824.

== Notes ==
Preceded by Carl Philipp Emanuel Bach	Cantor et Director chori musici in Hamburg; 1789–1821	Succeeded by Office dissolved
