= Transa (duo) =

British electronic music duo

Transa are a British electronic music duo composed of brothers Dave and Brendan Webster. Mostly active from the 1990s until the 2000s (decade), they have produced mostly trance music over their career, but have occasionally slipped into the realm of progressive house. They have also recorded under the aliases Cascade and Catcher. Their song Enervate, released in 1997, has been their greatest hit, followed by Supernova in 1999 and Behind The Sun in 1998.

Several of their songs and remixes have appeared on mix albums over the years, most notably Paul Oakenfold's first album in the Tranceport series and X-Cabs's Exposure 1. They have remixed for BT, Art of Trance, Tiësto, Ferry Corsten, Vengaboys, Armin van Buuren, Blue Amazon and Alice Deejay.

== Chart discography ==
- "Prophase" (1996) – UK #65
- "Enervate" (1997) – UK #42
