= Chab =

Swiss musician

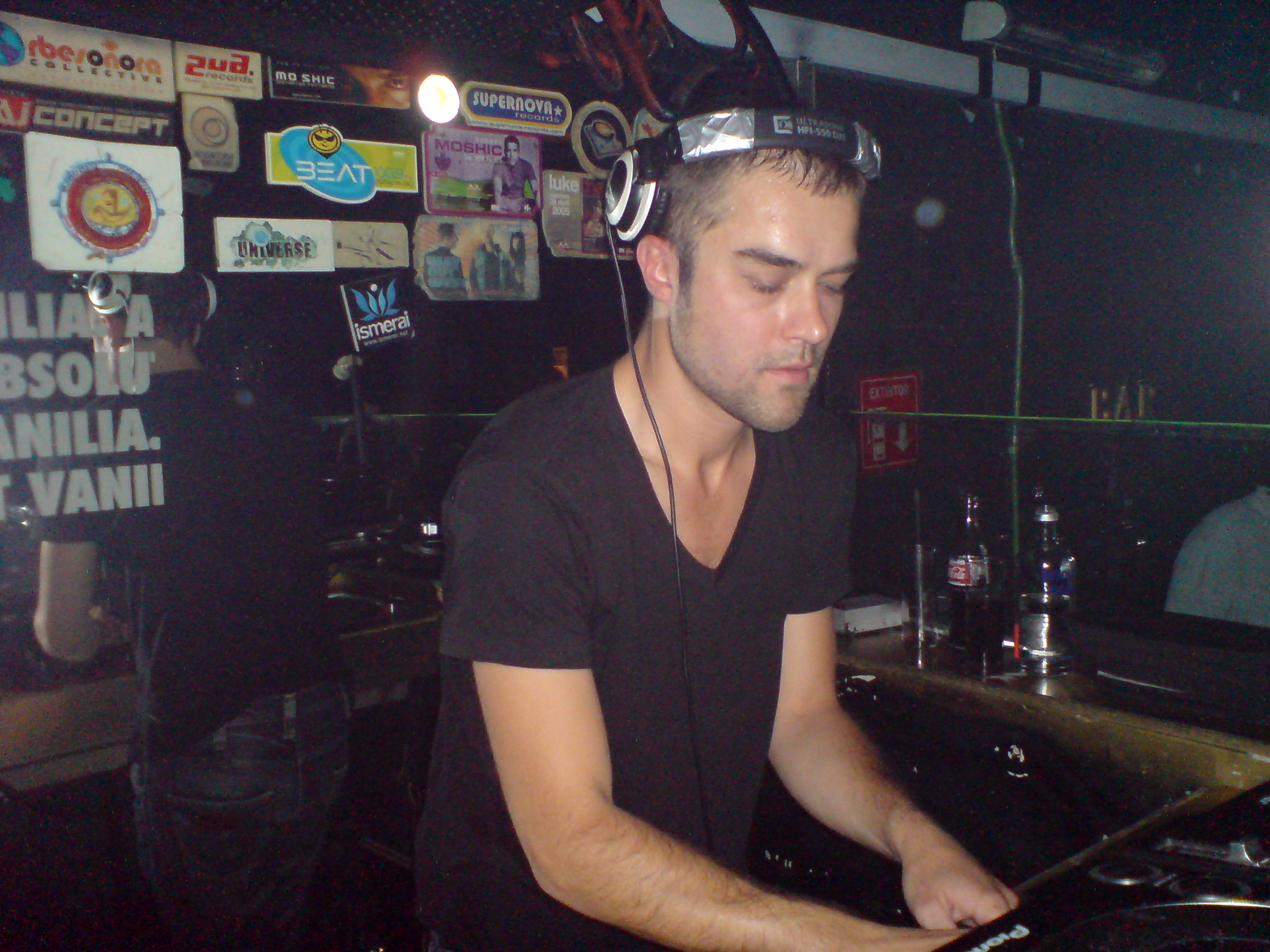
- Chab performing in 2007

Background information
- Also known as: Moogwai, Star
- Born: François Chabloz
- Origin: Switzerland
- Genres: Epic trance

François Chabloz, known professionally as Chab, is a Swiss trance music record producer and remixer . Known for his progressive trance style, Chabloz has an extensive history as a remixer and he has also released original material under the monikers Moogwai and Star. Artists remixed by Chab include Gorillaz, Depeche Mode, Röyksopp, Ayumi Hamasaki, Nelly Furtado, and Every Little Thing.

The work of Chab has been noticed by electronic DJ Paul Oakenfold and subsequently used on a trance compilation album of the same. In 2001, electronic music producer and DJ Tiësto featured Chab's work as well.

== Discography ==
- 1999 "Running Up That Hill" (with Frank Gee)
- 1999, 6/26 "A Night Out" (Moogwai)
- 2000 "Tunneling"/"The Sinus" (as Chab)
- 2000 "Rock Rose" (as Star)
- 2001 "Viola" (as Moogwai) - UK #55
- 2001 "The Labyrinth" (as Moogwai) - UK #68
- 2005 "5 Wishes & More" (as Moogwai)
- 2005 "Dub, Edits and Whisky-Coke" (as Chab)

== See also ==
- Revolution (Tiësto album)
