= Serenade No. 10 (Mozart) =

Serenade for winds by Wolfgang Amadeus Mozart

- Gran Partita
- by W. A. Mozart
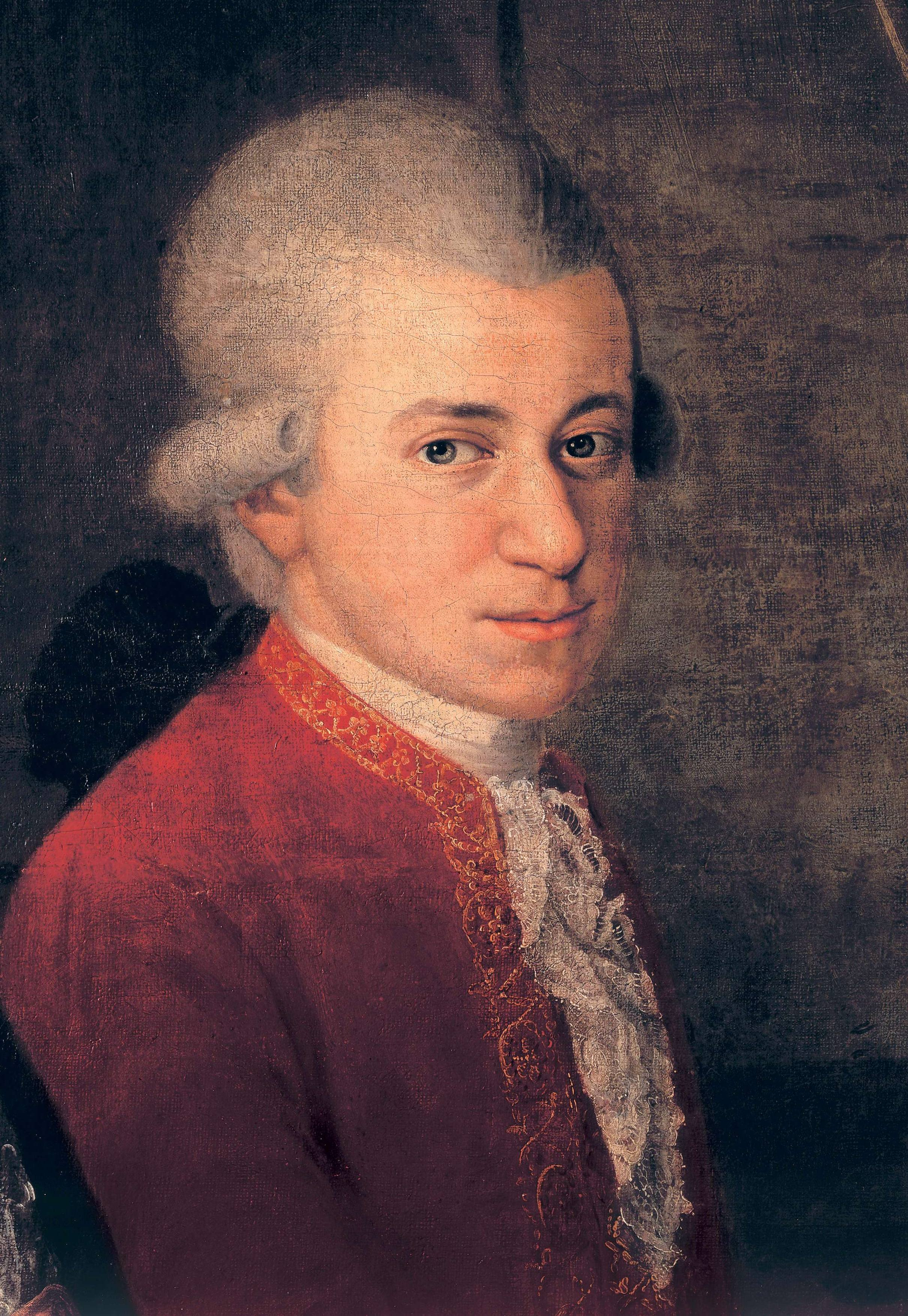
- Detail of Wolfgang from the 1780–81 Portrait of the Mozart Family
- Key: B♭ major
- Catalogue: K. 361/370a
- Composed: uncertain, first documented 23 March 1784
- Duration: about 50 minutes
- Movements: 7
- Scoring: Twelve winds and double bass

The Serenade No. 10 for winds in B♭ major, K. 361/370a, is a serenade by Wolfgang Amadeus Mozart scored for thirteen instruments: twelve winds and double bass. The Serenade was started in around 1781 and was completed on an unknown date. It is often known by the subtitle Gran Partita, though in the autograph manuscript it is misspelled ("Gran Partitta") and not in Mozart's hand. It consists of seven movements.

== Instrumentation ==
The work is scored for 2 oboes, 2 clarinets, 2 basset horns, 2 bassoons, 4 horns and double bass. In performance, the double bass is sometimes replaced by a contrabassoon. Mozart's Harmoniemusik, including K. 361, shows his interest in texture through his use of unique combinations of instruments for the era, scoring, rhythm and articulation.

== Movements ==
Serenade No. 10
I. Largo – Molto allegro

II. Menuetto

III. Adagio

IV. Menuetto. Allegretto

V. Romance. Adagio – Allegretto – Adagio

VI. Tema con variazioni

VII. Finale. Molto allegro
Performed by the United States Marine Band, 2021

The serenade is in seven movements as follows:

1. Largo – Molto allegro,
2. Menuetto, Trio I, Trio II, 3/4
3. Adagio, in E♭ major
4. Menuetto: Allegretto Trio I, Trio II, 3/4
5. Romance: Adagio, 3/4 in E♭ major – Allegretto, 2/4 – Adagio, 2/4
6. Tema con variazioni (six)
7. Finale: Allegro molto, 2/4

The opening movement begins with a slow introduction in B♭ major in which tutti syncopated rhythms are set in opposition to solo passages for clarinet and oboe. This leads into the Allegro moderato, which is a monothematic sonata form. The first theme of the exposition opens, originally presented in B♭ major in the clarinets, later returns in F major in the basset horns and oboes in a modified form as the second theme. This theme continues to be explored in the development and returns in the recapitulation, this time in B♭ major both times.

The second movement is a minuet featuring two contrasting trio sections. The minuet section is in B♭ major and uses all the instruments extensively. The first trio is in E♭ major and employs only the clarinets and basset horns. This section leads into a repeat of the minuet section. The second trio section is in the relative minor, G minor, and extensively uses the solo oboe, basset horn and bassoon.

Described by Goodwin as "virtually an 'operatic' ensemble of passionate feeling and sensuous warmth", the third movement, marked Adagio, is in E♭ major. A syncopated pulse occurs almost throughout the movement while solo lines alternate between the solo oboe, clarinet, and basset horn.

The fourth movement is a second minuet; like the second movement, it has two trio sections. The fast, staccato minuet section is in B♭ major. The first trio, by contrast, has fewer staccato notes and is in the parallel minor, B♭ minor. After the minuet section is repeated, the second trio is played. This section is in F major and is largely legato.

The fifth movement, labeled Romanze, returns to the slow tempo and E♭ major tonality of the third movement. The movement begins and ends with an Adagio section in the tonic and in triple meter with many long notes in the melody. Contrasting with these sections is an Allegretto section between them, which is in C minor and features constant pulse in the bassoons.

The sixth movement is a set of six variations on an Andante theme in B♭ major. The theme is presented primarily by the solo clarinet. The variations make use of various rhythmic motives and often feature solo instruments; for example, the first variation features the solo oboe. Unlike the other variations, all of which are in B♭ major, the fourth variation is in B♭ minor. The last two variations are in different tempos from the rest of the movement: the fifth is marked Adagio, while the sixth is marked Allegro. The last variation is also in triple meter, in contrast with the other variations, which are in duple meter.

The sixth movement, with the third variation slightly altered, was adapted by Mozart from the second movement of the Flute Quartet in C major (K. 285b).

The seventh and last movement is a rondo. The movement employs many tutti passages in which the oboes and clarinets play in unison, particularly in the rondo theme. The episodes between the returns of the theme feature a greater degree of interplay between the instruments.

== Arrangements ==
The first Breitkopf & Härtel Mozart edition included an arrangement for string quintet of four movements of the serenade. It was given the Köchel number 46, and published as series 24, no. 22. The arrangement is not by Mozart, but is the work of an unknown arranger. The Köchel number is also erroneous, as K. 46 would have placed it among Mozart's juvenile works, thus predating the work from which it was arranged. The arrangement uses the first three movements of the serenade and the last one. It was recorded by the Pascal and Barylli string quartets.

It was also arranged for oboe, violin, viola, cello, and keyboard by Christian Friedrich Gottlieb Schwencke (1767–1822). Reviewing a recording, Rick Anderson described the arrangement as "a masterpiece of orchestration, achieving a surprisingly rich and musically faithful evocation of the original thirteen-voice composition".

== In popular culture ==
- In the 1979 stage play Amadeus by Peter Shaffer and the 1984 film, Antonio Salieri's first encounter with Mozart is at a performance of this work. Salieri has not been impressed with Mozart's boorish behaviour before the performance, but as he looks at the music on the page, he describes the beauty and delight of the solo oboe's entry soon thereafter followed by the clarinet's line (in the third movement), leading him to say, "This was no composition by a performing monkey. This was a music I'd never heard. Filled with such longing, such unfulfillable longing. It seemed to me that I was hearing the voice of God." It is at this point that Salieri first questions how God could choose a vulgar man like Mozart as his voice; this question becomes a primary theme of the work.
- In How I Met Your Mother season 4, episode 2, "The Best Burger in New York", the third movement is played while Marshall praises "the best burger in New York" by saying: "Just a Burger? Just a burger. Robin, it's so much more than 'just a burger.' I mean... that first bite-oh, what heaven that first bite is. The bun, like a sesame freckled breast of an angel, resting gently on the ketchup and mustard below, flavors mingling in a seductive pas de deux. And then... a pickle! The most playful little pickle! Then a slice of tomato, a leaf of lettuce and a... a patty of ground beef so exquisite, swirling in your mouth, breaking apart, and combining again in a fugue of sweets and savor so delightful. This is no mere sandwich of grilled meat and toasted bread, Robin. This is God, speaking to us through food.", which is a spoof of the scene in Amadeus described above.
