= Chris Cowie =

Scottish DJ

Chris Cowie (born 28 October 1969) is a producer and DJ from Aberdeen, Scotland. Growing up on a council estate Cowie has gained mainstream and underground fame through his music and his DJ and live performances. He launched the record labels Hook Recordings and Bellboy Records in 1991. In 2001 he released the album Best Behavior.

== Background ==
The son of Brian and Ruth Cowie, he has two older brothers, Martin and Brian Jr. He grew up in the council estate of Torry in Aberdeen where he described his childhood as "normal." Cowie didn't particularly enjoy his early school years, saying "I couldn't wait to leave and near the end of my secondary school year I turned up occasionally. Instead of school I went to the library or the art gallery".

== Career ==
Cowie achieved mainstream and underground success through his own brand of eclectic music ranging from cutting edge dance to indie electronic. A particularly successful and prolific period for Cowie was when he launched two dance labels in 1992: Hook Recordings and Bellboy Records. The now defunct labels (as of 2001) achieved worldwide fame and were among the most successful and influential dance labels to come out of the UK scene. Today the labels' sound continue to influence and inspire a new generation of producers and musicians. A large part of the labels sound must be credited to Cowie. Around seventy five percent of the labels' output were a Chris Cowie production under one of his many aliases. Cowie has released in the region of one hundred and fifty separate recordings during a fifteen-year period. With such a prolific output Cowie decided early on in his career to create aliases to combat audience fatigue. He created around fifteen aliases, two of which were highly successful: Vegas Soul and X-Cabs.

=== As X-Cabs ===
Under this name, Cowie has recorded many original tracks and a solo album entitled Chemistry, as well as several remixes and the DJ mix album Exposure 1. Tracks Cowie has recorded under this alias include the highly successful Euro hit "Neuro" (of which a new version is released every year) and the subliminal "Infectious", which are featured on a multitude of vinyl releases and compilation albums. His remixes include Joshua Ryan's "Don't Look Back", Transa's "Prophase", and Sandra Collins's "Flutterby". His most successful remix was ATB's "Don't Stop" which reached Number 3 in the UK charts. His unique sound under this alias is still inspiring a new generation of electronic producers today more than thirteen years after its inception.

=== As Vegas Soul ===
Cowie released a number of 12" singles under this alias. 22 of these singles including new material were released on the critically acclaimed double CD Best Behaviour voted 8th best album of the year in Muzik magazine. Cowies Vegas Soul moniker was championed by a broad range of DJs and music lovers including John Peel, Laurent Garnier, Carl Cox, and Danny Tenaglia. Chris Cowie once said "The success and the unique sound of Hook Recordings is down to the music I make for Bellboy under aliases such as Vegas Soul. The sound and vibe of Hook generally stems from Bellboy. When I work with an artist or write my own track for Hook the sound is basically a more accessible Bellboy type deal which in turn has been influenced by the early soulful techno stuff."

=== Re-Launch of Hook-Recordings & Bellboy Records ===
Cowie re-launched Hook Recordings and Bellboy Records May 2008. For the first time the Hook-Bellboy tracks will be available for digital download. The Hook-Bellboy team will also be releasing new tracks in 2008. Cowie has asked Soulsupplement Records owner and producer Bruno Browning to join the Hook-Bellboy team to help with the running of the label.
