= Acid trance =

Subgenre of trance music

- Stylistic origins: Acid house; trance
- Cultural origins: Late 1980s, Europe
- Derivative forms: Hard trance

Acid trance is a genre of trance music that emerged in the late 1980s, focusing on using the acid sound. The trademark sound of "acid" is produced with a Roland TB-303 by playing a sequenced melody while altering the instrument's filter cutoff frequency, resonance, envelope modulation, and accent controls. This real-time tone adjustment was not part of the instrument's original intended operation. Acid trance is the best known form of trance music in Belgium. The form was first showcased at the popular Antwerp Rave 24 in Belgium, and has created four national number one singles in the country since.

Acid trance may be considered a descendant of acid house, since the genre of trance had not yet been invented during the advent of acid house (or acidhouse).

Acid trance is typically a faster tempo than acid house music, which is a genre that came before the birth of trance. This specific subgenre has a more simplistic approach to arrangement than the trance music commonly associated with the late 1990s.

The first volumes of Trancemaster compilations contains a few tracks in acid trance style, just as classic trance tracks. The difference is, while acid trance tracks focus more on the changing TB-303 lines, classic trance (e.g. Dance 2 Trance, Cosmic Baby, Age of Love, and Jam & Spoon) tracks are more atmospheric, they use "softer" synth-lines, often strings and other ambient music elements. The line between these two styles is quite blurred; they also emerged about the same time.

Acid trance is often associated with the rise of Goa Trance, another trance subgenre that focuses on spirituality and uses imagery that is very complex and existential in nature. Goa Trance was created in the Indian state of Goa. Goa Gil is thought to be the father of this genre.

The term "psytrance" is often associated with acid trance, and these terms are used interchangeably (even though the genres are not exactly the same). However, typical "acid" sounds and effects are found in both genres. Typically samples are used that reference psychedelic drugs and religious topics. The umbrella genre of acid tends to reference psychedelic drugs as a variable of electronic dance music that is inseparable from the genre.

Drug use appears to be ingrained in the culture of Acid Trance and other genres that derive from acid. Percussion in the genre seems to be manufactured to allow listeners on perspective altering substances to have a psychological response. The steady beating of the drum samples in the genre provides a solid intense base for the overlapping lead melodies typically found in acid trance.

Acid trance artists are often grouped with their classical and Goa counterparts. It is not uncommon to see many of the first acid trance artists featured on Goa trance compilation albums. However, some of these artists never considered themselves part of the Goa or psychedelic scene and these compilation albums were often done by their record labels who published acid trance alongside Goa artists.

== Notable labels ==
- Attack Records
- Harthouse
- Moonshine Music
- Platipus Records
- Rising High Records
