= Matt Darey =

- Also known as: 8-Bit Trip, Bi Boy Action Squad, DSP, Li Kwan, Lost Tribe, Mash Up, MDM, One Little Arab, Paul Austin, Space Baby, Sunburst, Tekara, Urban Astronauts, Xstasia
- Born: Matthew Jonathan Darey; 29 November 1968 (age 57); Leicester, England
- Genres: Trance, EDM
- Label: Armada Music
- Website: www.mattdarey.com

Matthew Jonathan Darey (born 29 November 1968) is an English trance music producer and performer. Darey has sold over two million albums and singles with numerous top 40 chart hits.

== Music career ==
Darey was born in Leicester, England. Some of his earliest solo work was under the name Lost Tribe, releasing the EP The Distant Voices in 1997. The single "Gamemaster" reached number 24 on the UK Singles Chart in 1999.

The main melody of Gamemaster contains an uncredited sample of the ARIA nominated trance pioneering hit single Dreams written and produced by Quench (musician) Christopher J. Dolan in 1993.

In addition to production and remixing work for other artists, Darey began releasing music under his own name in 2004. In 2005 he debuted a new show on Digitally Imported called Nocturnal, which became a weekly show the following year. His 2007 single "Beautiful Day" reached the top 25 on Billboard's Hot Dance Music Club Play and hitting the Top 20 on the Hot Dance Airplay chart in the United States. Darey has made several appearances in the annual worldwide top 100 DJs poll, including peaking at No. 34 in 2008.

Darey owns a record label, Darey Products, featuring releases from himself and upcoming artists. In 2015 he changed his stage name to Matt Nouveau to signal a change in musical direction. As of 2021 Darey hosts a monthly Internet radio show on Digitally Imported's European Trance station.

== Discography ==
=== Albums and EPs ===
- Lost Tribe – The Distant Voices EP (1997 – Hooj Choons)
- Voice of an Angel EP (2004, Incentive Records)
- Point Zero EP (2005, Water Music Records)
- Decade (2004; also released a 200-copy limited-edition version)
- Urban Astronauts – EP1 (31 March 2008; Koch Records) The debut EP from Darey's side project Urban
- Matt Darey pres. Urban Astronauts feat. Kate Louise Smith – See The Sun (Remixes) (9 November 2009; Nocturnal Global)
- Blossom & Decay (3 August 2012)
- Wolf (2017)

=== Singles ===
- Li Kwan – "Point Zero" (1994) No. 51 UK (with "I Need A Man")
- Space Baby – "Free Your Mind" (1995) No. 55 UK
- Lost Tribe – "Gamemaster" (1999 – Hooj Choons) No. 24 UK
- "Liberation" (1999) No. 19 UK
- M3 – "Bailamos" (1999) No. 40 UK
- Melt featuring Little Ms Marcie – "Hard House Music" (2000) No. 59 UK
- Sunburst – "Eyeball (Eyeball Paul's Theme)" (2000) No. 48 UK
- Matt Darey presents DSP – "From Russia with Love" (2000 – Liquid Asset) No. 40 UK
- MDM – "Mash It Up" No. 66 UK
- "Liberation (Fly Like An Angel)" (2001)
- "Beautiful" (2002, with Marcella Woods) No. 10 UK
- "U Shine On" / "Moody" (2002, with Marcella Woods – Incentive Records) No. 34 UK
- Lost Tribe – "Gamemaster" (2003 remake of the 1999 single – Liquid Asset) No. 61 UK
- Lost Tribe – "Possessed" (2004 – Darey Products)
- "Electro Buzz" (2003 – Incentive Records)
- "Voice of An Angel" (2003 – Incentive Records)
- "Nocturnal Delight" (2004 – Incentive Records)
- "Liberation 2005" (2005; 2 CDs with 13 remixes of the song – Darey Products)
- "Eternity" (2005 – Darey Products)
- "Always" (2006, featuring Tiff Lacey – Darey Products)
- "Beautiful Day" (2007, featuring Antoine and Marcia Juell)
- "Sum of All Fears" (2007, featuring Tiff Lacey – Darey Products)
- "Animal" (2008, with Urban Astronauts)
- "Hold Your Breath" featuring Leah – Armada Music (2012)
- "I Will Follow You" with Stan Kolev featuring Aelyn – Armada Music (2012)

=== Selected remixes ===
- Agnelli & Nelson – "El Niño"
- ATB – "9pm"
- Binary Finary – "1998" / "1999"
- Blockster – "Grooveline"
- Delerium – "Heaven's Earth"
- Gabrielle – "Rise"
- Kim Wilde – "Breaking Away"
- Kim Wilde – "Heaven"
- Kim Wilde – "Shame"
- Headstrong featuring Tiff Lacey – "Close Your Eyes"
- Johnna – "Do What You Feel"
- Magners – "Shlurgen"
- Moloko – "The Time is Now"
- Planet Perfecto Feat. Grace – "Not Over Yet"
- Technique - "Sun is Shining"
- The Space Brothers – "Legacy"
- Tin Tin Out – "Sometimes"
- Tin Tin Out – "Strings for Yasmin"
- Westbam – "Wizards of the Sonic"

=== Selected album appearances ===
- Reactivate 10 (1995)
- Ibiza Euphoria (1999)
- Pure Euphoria
- The Very Best of Euphoria (2002, mixed by Darey)
- Upfront Trance (2005, Water Music Records)
- Ultimate Trance (Mixed by Darey) (2005)
- Nocturnal album (Mixed by Darey) (September 2007)
- Nocturnal 2010 (Mixed by Darey) (May 2010)

=== Video games ===
- NGEN Racing (soundtrack)
