= Oliver Lieb =

German electronic music producer and DJ

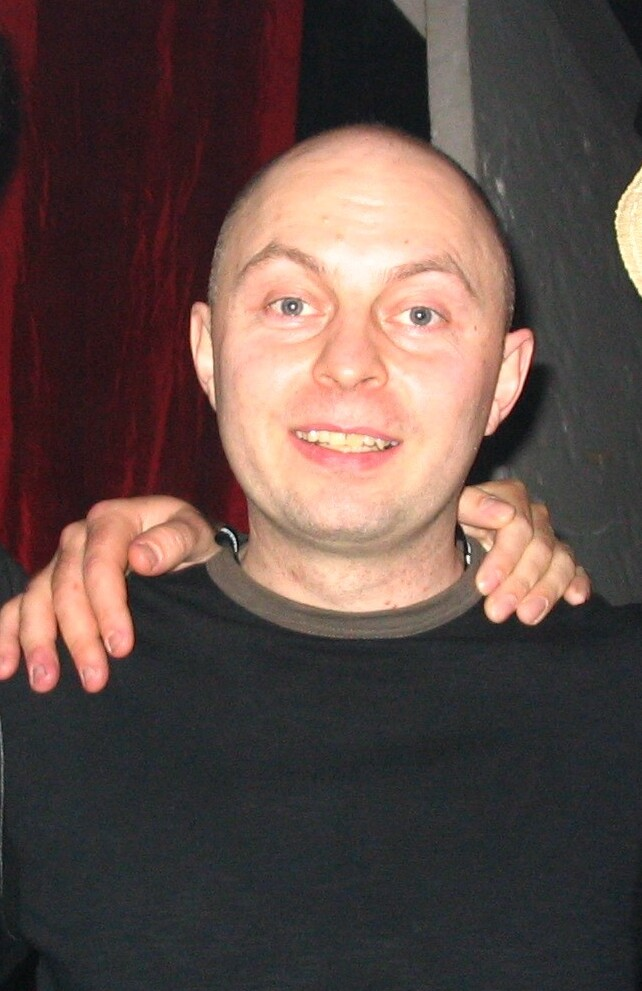

Background information
- Also known as: Alpha Omega, Ambush, The, Archon, Ecano, Every, Genetix, Gobiman, Ivan, LSG, Mark III, Mindspace, Multiplicity, O.L., Paragliders, Phools Inc, Radical Impression, S.O.L., Smoked, Snakemen, Solieb, Spicelab, Strike, Superspy
- Born: 1969 (age 56–57); Frankfurt, West Germany
- Genres: Trance, house, techno
- Years active: 1988–present
- Labels: Hooj Choons, Superstition Records

Oliver Lieb (born 1969 in Frankfurt, Germany) is an electronic music producer and DJ. He has recorded under more than a dozen aliases with over 200 productions and remixes in various genres such as trance, house and techno. He has also produced tracks for other artists.

== Career ==
Lieb began his musical career at the age of fourteen as a bassist in funk and soul bands. However, he often left the bands he played in before they found any real success. Eventually he started exploring electronic music.

His first record, under the alias 'Force Legato', was released by ZYX Music. In 1992, Lieb met Matthias Schindehutte, A&R man for the newly formed Harthouse record label, who contracted him for the Spicelab project. At the same time, Lieb started work on harder tracks, released using the alias Psilocybin. 1993 saw his first releases under the alias L.S.G. on the Hamburg-based Superstition record label, which he discontinued in 2007; in 2015, Lieb announced the reactivation of the project. In 1994, he first co-operated with Harald Großkopf (whom he later also performed with live), releasing tracks using the alias The Ambush. Numerous other aliases were developed by Lieb during the 1990s; these included 23 different aliases as a solo artist, including Paragliders and Superspy, and twenty-two aliases for different groups and collaborations, including Force Legato (with Torsten Fenslau) and Azid Force (with Pascal Dardoufas, a.k.a. Pascal F.E.O.S.).

In 1997, using the alias LSG, Lieb spent a week at No. 63 in the UK Singles Chart with "Netherworld". In 2000, and using his own name, he appeared in the UK Singles Chart for one week at No. 72 with the track "Metropolis", billed as 'Oliver Lieb presents Smoked'.
