= Trance music =

Genre of electronic dance music

Trance
- Stylistic origins: House; techno; acid house; chill-out; pop; classical; film score; hardcore techno; new-age music; Detroit techno
- Cultural origins: Late 1980s – early 1990s in Western Europe (United Kingdom, Germany, Belgium, and Netherlands)

Subgenres
- Acid trance; Balearic trance; Goa trance; hard trance; progressive trance; psychedelic trance; tech trance; uplifting trance; vocal trance; (complete list)

Other topics
- Stage lighting; liquid light shows; Eurodance; glowsticking; gloving; rave; nightclub

Trance is a genre of electronic dance music that emerged from the techno and EBM scene in Frankfurt, Germany, in the late 1980s and early 1990s, and quickly spread throughout Europe.

Trance music is typically characterized by a tempo between 120 and 150 beats per minute (BPM), repeating melodic phrases and a musical form that distinctly builds tension and elements throughout a track often culminating in 1 to 2 "peaks" or "drops". Although trance is a genre of its own, it liberally incorporates influences from other musical styles such as techno, house, chill-out, classical music, tech house, ambient and film scores.

A trance is a state of hypnotism and heightened consciousness. This is portrayed in trance music by the mixing of layers with distinctly foreshadowed build-up and release. A common characteristic of modern trance music is a mid-song climax followed by a soft breakdown disposing of beats and percussion entirely, leaving the melody or atmospherics to stand alone for an extended period before gradually building up again. Trance tracks are often lengthy to allow for such progression and commonly have sufficiently sparse opening and closing sections to facilitate mixing by DJs.

Trance is mostly instrumental, although vocals can be mixed in: typically they are performed by mezzo-soprano to soprano female soloists, mostly without a traditional verse/chorus structure. Structured vocal form in trance music forms the basis of the vocal trance subgenre, which has been described as "grand, soaring, and operatic" and "ethereal female leads floating amongst the synths". However, male singers, such as Jonathan Mendelsohn, are also featured.

== History ==
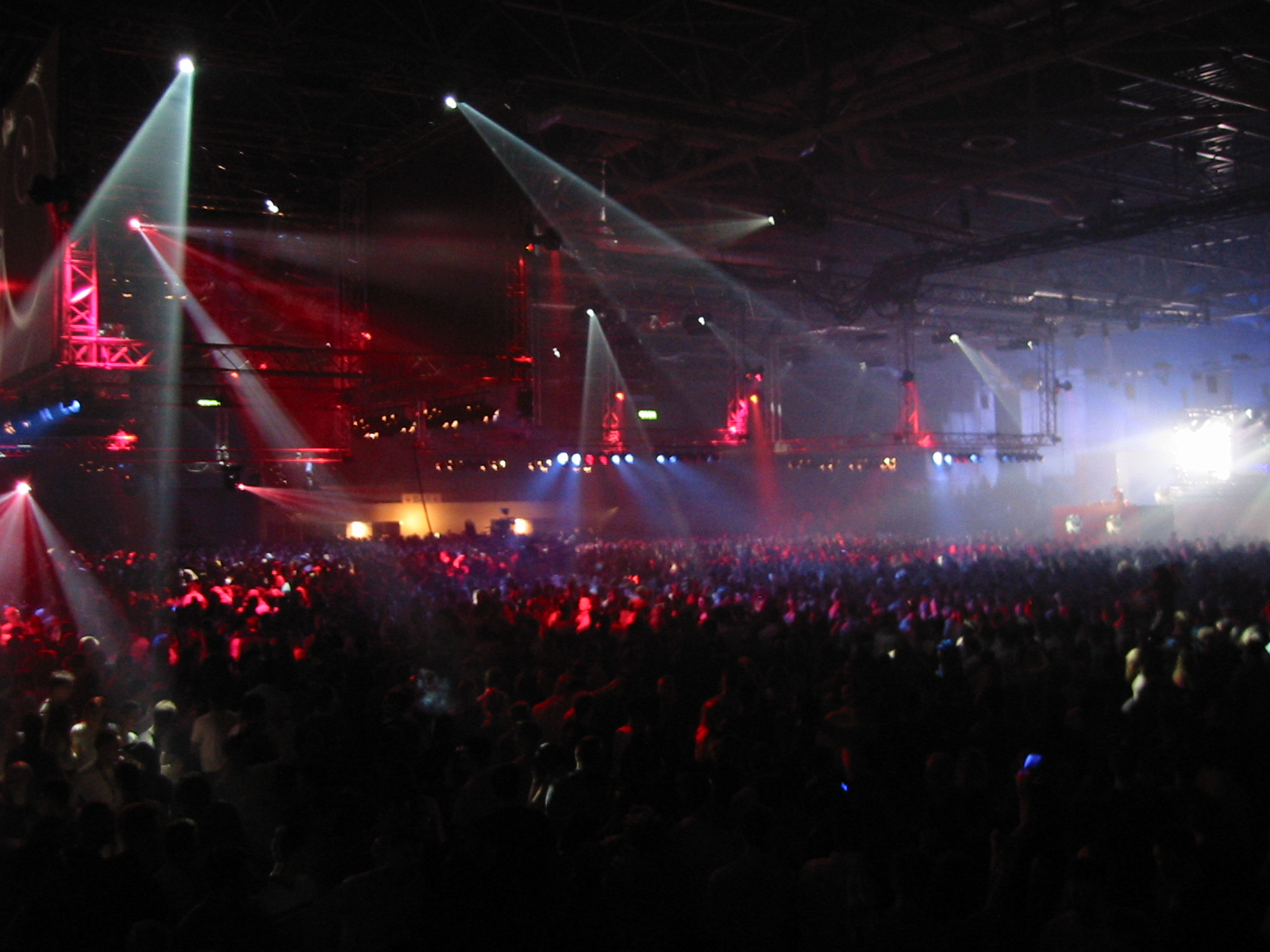
Trance Energy Festival at Utrecht

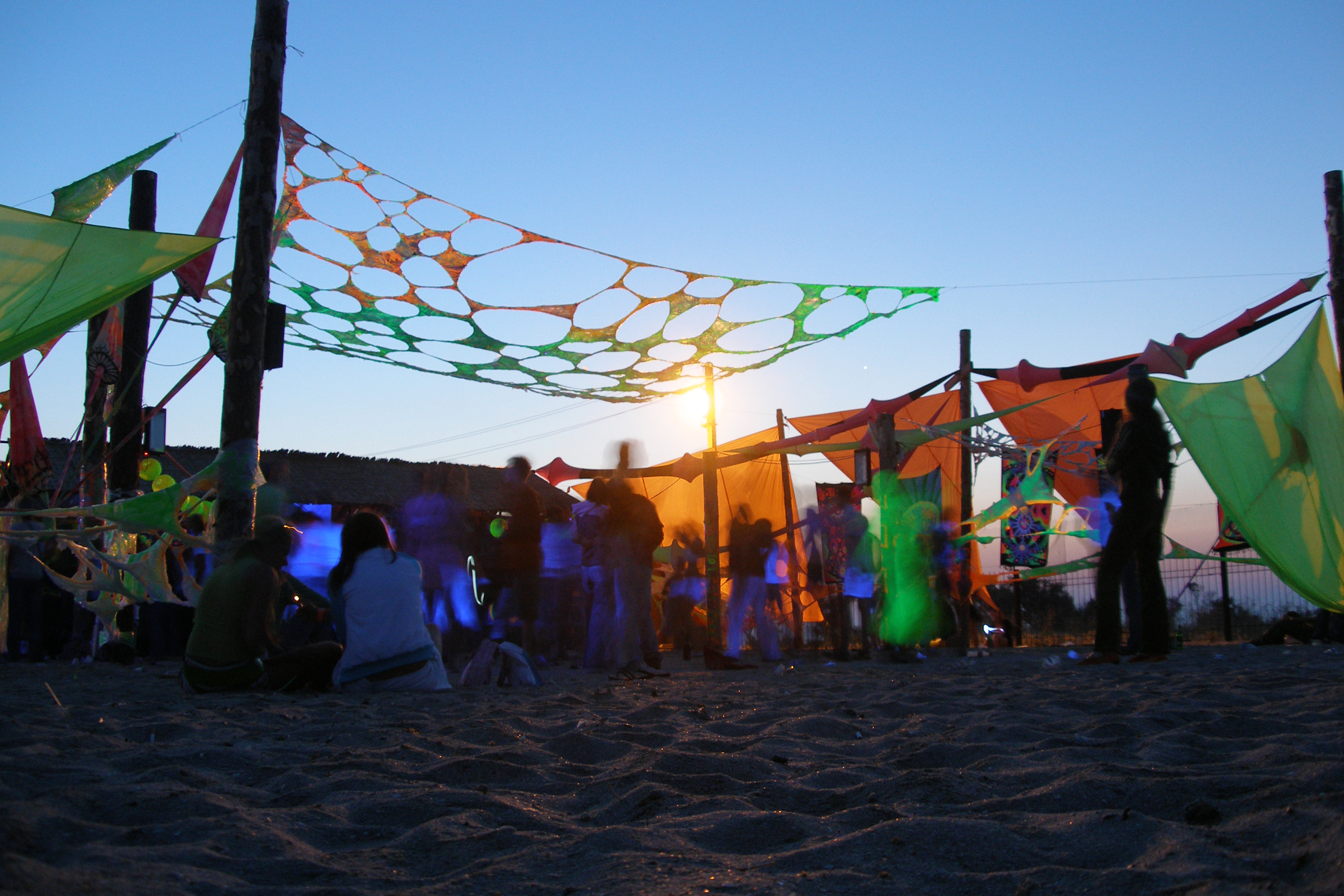
Psychedelic trance culture of KaZantip in 2006, with decorations commonplace at trance parties

The KLF's "What Time is Love? (Pure Trance)" was released in the UK in 1988. The earliest years of Trance were defined by Frankfurt labels such as Eye Q, Harthouse, Fax +49-69/450464, Force Inc., and others. Producers such as Pete Namlook, Oliver Lieb, and Rolf Ellmer created noteworthy tracks such as "Eternal Spirit" by 4Voice, "Hearts" by L.S.G., and "We Came in Peace" by Dance 2 Trance.

Much of the development of trance can be traced to Sven Väth, who was heavily influenced by his experiences traveling to Goa where DJs were using psychedelic rock and other sounds to induce a trance state at beach parties. Väth, Dag Lerner, and Torsten Fenslau had an affection for hypnotic dance sounds and the music at Dorian Gray and Omen began to reflect this.

Väth launched Eye Q with Heinz Roth and Matthias Hoffman in 1991, followed by Harthouse in 1992, releasing some of the most well-known trance tracks of the era. Eye Q took a softer approach to trance with records such as Cygnus X's "The Orange Theme", Brainchild's "Symmetry" and Vernon's "Wonderer". Harthouse focused on a harder trance sound with tracks such as "Quicksand" by Spicelab, "Spectrum" by Metal Master, "Human" by Resistance D, and "Acperience" by Hardfloor. The sound of Frankfurt was the sound of trance. DJ Dag Lerner, one half of Dance to Trance has stated that he was the first to call his music trance and "gave the child his name." The genre got its name from the trance-like state the music attempted to emulate in the 1990s before the genre's focus changed.

In a 2006 interview with Resident Advisor, Sven Väth acknowledged the role of his labels Eye Q and Harthouse in helping to create what people know as trance music today, going on to say that "people are getting a wrong interpretation of what trance music is all about" and differentiating his own form from modern forms, saying, "They are following a format -- always producing the same structure. It's a pop format for trance."

As German trance made its way back to Goa, a new subgenre emerged that was more organic in sound with an oriental aesthetic in its melodies, often with references to Eastern philosophy. Goa trance would go on to spawn many sub-genres of its own, including psytrance, psybreaks, and others.

In 1991 in Berlin, MFS Records began to gain a trance profile, signing Mijk van Dijk, Cosmic Baby, and Paul van Dyk, soon releasing some of the most well-known early trance tracks such as "Love Stimulation" by Humate and "Perfect Day" by Visions of Shiva, as well as perhaps the first ever trance compilation, Tranceformed From Beyond. While writer Bom Coen traces the roots of trance to Paul van Dyk's 1993 remix of Humate's "Love Stimulation", there is little evidence to support this contention. In fact, van Dyk's own trance roots can be traced further back to his work with Visions of Shiva, van Dyk's trance project with Cosmic Baby coming earlier. Early on, Paul van Dyk had been relatively sidelined on the scene, but his collaboration with Cosmic Baby quickly led him into the heart of the scene.

In the UK, the British approach to trance music and house music was similar: progressive chord structures, crescendos, longer breakdowns, and more organic instruments. In 1993 Platipus Records was launched by Simon Berry as an outlet for Barry's various projects, including Union Jack, Clanger, Art of Trance. Platipus would become one of the most consequential progressive trance labels. Another influential label of progressive trance was Hooj Choons with notable trance releases from artists Tilt, Oliver Lieb, Solarstone, as well as the well-known Three N' One remix of Cafe Del Mar by Energy 52.

In Australia, Christopher J. Dolan from Melbourne, who performs as Quench released "Dreams" in 1993. It was re-released in 1994 and was nominated for the ARIA Award for Best Dance Release at the ARIA Music Awards of 1995. It peaked at No. 9 on the French singles chart, and No. 75 on the United Kingdom Singles Chart. By October 2000 it had sold over a million copies worldwide.

In Germany, a harder sub-genre of trance emerged. With a faster tempo and gated pads, hard trance introduced the breakdown-build-anthem template that would become nearly ubiquitous in later trance sub-genres. Hard trance would inspire hardhouse, hard uplifting, jumpstyle, NRG, and hardstyle. Perhaps the best known label for this subgenre of trance was Bonzai Records, a sublabel of Lightning Records with notable tracks including Jones & Stephenson's "The First Rebirth", Cherry Moon Trax's "The House of House", and Blue Alphabet's "Cybertrance".

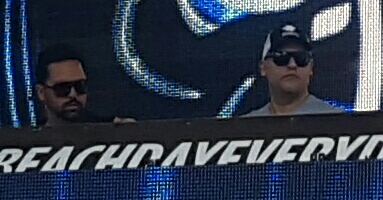
Aly & Fila, Egyptian trance music duo performing

By the late 1990s, uplifting took over the scene with its fast tempo, characteristic builds, long breakdowns and big drops. In the early 2000s, pop-style vocals began being added into the music. The development of another subgenre, epic trance, finds some of its origins in classical music, with film music also being influential. Trance was arguably at its commercial peak in the second part of 1990s and early 2000s.

From the late 2000s to the mid 2010s, popular trance music providers such as Armin van Buuren's A State of Trance, Paul van Dyk, and Above & Beyond remained popular, while lesser known DJs changed to other sounds. In 2017 a new wave of underground DJs such as Nina Kraviz began incorporating trance music into their sets.

== Production ==
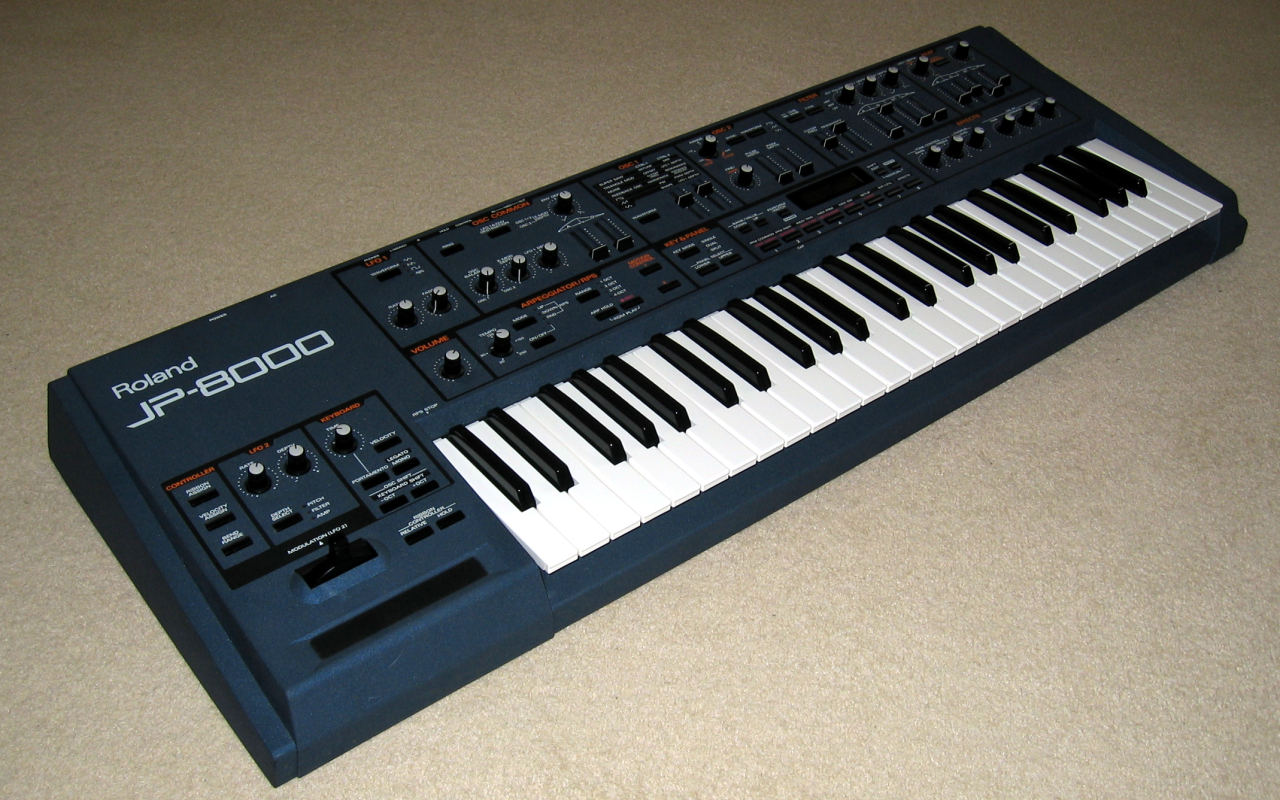
The Roland JP-8000, a synthesizer famous for its incorporation of the supersaw waveform

Trance employs a 4/4 time signature, generally using a tempo of 125 to 150 BPM, though the music can be any tempo, and 16- or 32-beat phrases. A kick drum is usually placed on every downbeat and a regular open hi-hat is often placed on the upbeat. While the majority of trance music uses the same "four-on-the-floor" beat as house and techno, in trance the kick drum is often de-emphasized to give space to the bassline, whereas in house and techno the kick drum is heavily emphasized, often being the loudest sound in the mix. Extra percussive elements are usually added, and in recent years major transitions, builds or climaxes are often foreshadowed by lengthy "snare rolls"—a quick succession of snare drum hits that build in velocity, frequency, and volume towards the end of a measure.

A Simple arpeggiated (Roland JP-8000) Supersaw waveform pattern with chorus and flanging (Some professionals used Lexicon Hall programs without pre-delay.)

A trance gate pattern at 141 bpm as it is heard on a software trance gate using a Roland JP-8000 with the supersaw waveform and minor EQ edits. The gated pattern gradually changes to demonstrate the various rhythms possible with a trance gate. Note that some trance gate patterns are off-beat.

Rapid arpeggios and minor keys are common features of trance, the latter being almost universal. Trance tracks often use one central "hook", or melody, which runs through almost the entire song, repeating at intervals anywhere between 2 beats and 32 bars, in addition to harmonies and motifs in different timbres from the central melody. Instruments are added or removed every 4, 8, 16, or 32 bars.

In the section before the breakdown, the lead motif is often introduced in a sliced up and simplified form, to give the audience a "taste" of what they will hear after the breakdown. Then later, the final climax is usually "a culmination of the first part of the track mixed with the main melodic reprise".

As is the case with many dance music tracks, trance tracks are usually built with sparser intros ("mix-ins") and outros ("mix-outs") to enable DJs to blend them together immediately.

EDM-infused forms designed for festival main stages often incorporate other styles and elements of electronic music such as electro and progressive house into its production. They emphasize harsher basslines and drum beats that decrease the importance of offbeats and focus primarily on a four on the floor stylistic house drum pattern. The BPM of more recent styles tends to be on par with house music at 120 to 135 beats per minute. However, unlike house music, recent forms of Uplifting continue to feature melodic breakdowns and longer transitions.

== Subgenres ==
Trance music is broken into a number of subgenres including acid trance, classic trance, hard trance, progressive trance, and uplifting trance. Uplifting trance is also known as "anthem trance", "epic trance", "commercial trance", "stadium trance", or "euphoric trance", and has been strongly influenced by classical music in the 1990s and 2000s by leading artists such as Ferry Corsten, Armin Van Buuren, Paul Van Dyk, Tiësto, Push, Rank 1 and at present with the development of the subgenre "orchestral uplifting trance" or "uplifting trance with symphonic orchestra" by such artists as Sound Apparel, Andy Blueman, Ciro Visone, Soundlift, Arctic Moon, and Sergey Nevone & Simon O'Shine, among others. Closely related to uplifting trance is Eurodance, which has become a general term for a wide variety of highly commercialized European dance music. Notably, German producer ATB revolutionized the scene of the aforementioned Eurodance in the late 1990s with his hit single "9 PM (Till I Come)". Several subgenres are crossovers with other major genres of electronic music. For instance, tech trance is a mixture of trance and techno, and vocal trance "combines [trance's] progressive elements with pop music". The dream trance genre originated in the mid-1990s, with its popularity then led by Robert Miles, who composed Children in 1996. Recently, there is also a very small subgenre called "medieval trance", which combines medieval elements together with trance elements, e.g. Maestro Giano, Green Clouds and other artists, which are effectively a kind of "reverse Bardcore".

AllMusic states on progressive trance: "the progressive wing of the trance crowd led directly to a more commercial, chart-oriented sound since trance had never enjoyed much chart action in the first place. Emphasizing the smoother sound of Eurodance or house (and occasionally more reminiscent of Jean-Michel Jarre than Basement Jaxx), Progressive Trance became the sound of the world's dance floors by the end of the millennium. Critics ridiculed its focus on predictable breakdowns and relative lack of skill to beat-mix, but progressive trance was caned by the hottest DJ."

== See also ==
- List of trance genres
