= Ferry Corsten discography =

This is a discography of the Dutch DJ, record producer and remixer Ferry Corsten (also known under the alias System F).

== Albums ==
=== Studio albums ===
Title	Details	Peak chart positions		
Title	Details	NL	US Dance	UK Dance
Right of Way	Released: 25 October 2003; Label: Flashover Recordings; Format: Digital download, CD	66	21	—
L.E.F	Released: 26 May 2006; Label: Flashover Recordings; Format: Digital download, CD	58	21	36
Twice in a Blue Moon	Released: 4 November 2008; Label: Flashover Recordings, Ultra; Format: Digital download, CD	23	—	—
WKND	Released: 24 February 2012; Label: Flashover Recordings, Ultra Records; Format: Digital download, CD	51	—	13
Blueprint	Released: 26 May 2017; Label: Flashover Recordings; Format: Digital download, CD	—	—	—
Connect	Released: 22 November 2024; Label: Flashover Recordings; Format: Digital download	—	—	—

As DJ Sno-White

- 1996: Santa's X-Mas Dance Party

As Ferr

- 1996: Looking Forward
- 2020: As Above So Below

As System F

- 2001: Out of the Blue
- 2003: Together

=== Soundtrack albums ===
- 2019 Don't Go (Original Motion Picture Soundtrack)

=== Remix albums ===
- 2009: Twice in a Blue Moon Remixed
- 2017: Blueprint Remixed

=== Compilation albums ===
- 2000: Early Works & Remix Projects
- 2002: The Very Best of Ferry Corsten
- 2004: Best (as System F, Gouryella)
- 2005: Best of System F & Gouryella (Part One)
- 2006: Best of System F & Gouryella (Part Two)
- 2009: The Best of Pulp Victim (only digital download)
- 2014: Trance Classics – The Best Of (as Pulp Victim) (only digital download)
- 2016: Hello World
- 2016: From the Heavens (as Ferry Corsten presents Gouryella)

== DJ mixes ==
- 1999 Artist Profile Series 1: Solar Serenades
- 1999 Live at Innercity: Amsterdam RAI
- 1999 Trance Nation
- 1999 Trance Nation 2
- 2000 TranceMatch (as System F vs. Armin)
- 2000 Trance Nation Three
- 2000 Trance Nation Four
- 2000 Judge Jules Presents Judgement Sundays
- 2000 Oslo Central
- 2001 Tsunami One (as Ferry Corsten & Robert Smit)
- 2001 Trance Nation 2001
- 2001 Global Trancemissions 01: Amsterdam
- 2001 Trancedome 1
- 2001 Live at Dance Valley
- 2002 Trance Nation 2002
- 2002 Global Trancemissions 02: Ibiza
- 2002 World Tour: Tokyo
- 2003 Kontor Top of the Clubs Vol. 18
- 2003 Mixed Live: Spundae @ Circus, Los Angeles
- 2003 World Tour: Washington
- 2004 Dance Valley #10: A Decade of Dance: Main Stage Edition
- 2004 Infinite Euphoria
- 2005 Passport: Kingdom of the Netherlands
- 2005 Creamfields 2005
- 2006 Mixmag 03/06
- 2007 Passport: United States of America
- 2007 Live at Dance Valley 2007
- 2008 Gatecrasher Sheffield
- 2010 Once Upon a Night Vol. 1
- 2010 Once Upon a Night (Special Summer Mix)
- 2010 Once Upon a Night Vol. 2
- 2012 20 Years of Ferry Corsten: The Mix
- 2012 The Sound of Flashover
- 2012 Once Upon a Night Vol. 3
- 2013 Once Upon a Night Vol. 4
- 2013 Full On Ibiza
- 2016 From the Heavens (as Ferry Corsten presents Gouryella)
- 2026 Flashover Recordings - Friends of A State of Trance, Vol. 1

== Singles and EPs ==
Ferry Corsten:

- 2002 "Punk" (from Right of Way) – #29 UK
- 2003 "Indigo"
- 2003 "Rock Your Body Rock" (from Right of Way) – #11 UK, #72 AUS
- 2004 "Everything Goes"
- 2004 "It's Time" (from Right of Way) – #51 UK
- 2004 "Right of Way" (from Right of Way)
- 2004 "Sweet Sorrow" (from Right of Way)
- 2005 "Holding On" (with Shelley Harland) (from Right of Way)
- 2005 "Star Traveller" (from Right of Way)
- 2005 "Sublime" (from Right of Way)
- 2006 "Fire" (from L.E.F.) – #40 UK, #61 AUS
- 2006 "Junk" (from L.E.F.) – #38 NL
- 2006 "Watch Out" (from L.E.F.) – #57 UK
- 2006 "Whatever!" (from Right of Way)
- 2007 "Beautiful" (from L.E.F.)
- 2007 "Forever" (from L.E.F.)
- 2007 "The Race"
- 2007 "Brain Box" (from Twice in a Blue Moon)
- 2007 "Bring the Noise Remix" (as Public Enemy vs. Ferry Corsten)
- 2008 "Into the Dark" (from L.E.F.)
- 2008 "Radio Crash" (from Twice in a Blue Moon)
- 2009 "Made of Love" (featuring Betsie Larkin) (from Twice in a Blue Moon)
- 2009 "We Belong" (featuring Maria Nayler) (from Twice in a Blue Moon)
- 2009 "Because the Remix" (featuring Novastar)
- 2009 "Twice in a Blue Moon" (from Twice in a Blue Moon)
- 2011 "Feel It!" (from WKND)
- 2011 "Check It Out" (from WKND)
- 2011 "Brute" (vs. Armin van Buuren) (from WKND)
- 2012 "Ain't No Stoppin'" (featuring Ben Hague) (from WKND)
- 2012 "Live Forever" (featuring Aruna) (from WKND)
- 2012 "Loops & Tings" (vs. Markus Schulz)
- 2012 "Not Coming Down" (featuring Betsie Larkin) (from WKND)
- 2012 "Silfra"
- 2012 "Stella" (vs. Markus Schulz)
- 2013 "One Thousand Suns" (instrumental version featuring Chicane)
- 2013 "Kudawudashuda"
- 2013 "Love Will" (featuring Duane Harden) (from WKND)
- 2013 "Stars" (as Betsie Larkin & Ferry Corsten)
- 2013 "One Thousand Suns" (vocal version featuring Chicane and Christian Burns)
- 2013 "Collision" (& Bassjackers)
- 2013 "Black Light"
- 2013 "F the Bull$h1t"
- 2013 "Magenta" (with Giuseppe Ottaviani)
- 2013 "Diss!"
- 2013 "Many Ways"
- 2014 "Hyper Love" (featuring Nat Dunn)
- 2015 Hello World EP 1
- 2015 Hello World EP 2
- 2015 Hello World EP 3
- 2016 "Event Horizon" (with Cosmic Gate)
- 2017 "Dynamic" (with Cosmic Gate)
- 2017 "Reanimate" (featuring Clairity) (from WKND)
- 2017 "Waiting" (featuring Niels Geusebroek) (from WKND)
- 2017 "Trust" (from WKND)
- 2017 "Wherever You Are" (featuring Haliene) (from WKND)
- 2017 "Lonely Inside"
- 2018 "Something To Believe In" (featuring Eric Lumiere)
- 2018 "Camellia" (with Aly & Fila)
- 2018 "A Slice of Heaven" (with Paul Oakenfold) (UNITY project)
- 2018 "Safe With Me" (with Dim3nsion)(UNITY project)
- 2018 "Rosetta" (with Jordan Suckley)(UNITY project)
- 2018 "I Love You (Won't Give It Up)"
- 2018 "Synchronicity" (with Saad Ayub)(UNITY project)
- 2018 "We're Not Going Home" (with Ilan Bluestone)(UNITY project)
- 2019 "Freefall" (featuring Nevve)
- 2019 "1997" (with BT)(UNITY project)
- 2019 "Hear It Now" (with Johnny B)
- 2019 "I Am You" (with Gabriel & Dresden)(UNITY project)
- 2020 "Flanging" (with Purple Haze)(UNITY project)
- 2020 "Tomorrow"
- 2020 "Mo Chara" (with Ciaran McAuley)(UNITY project)
- 2020 "Black Lion" (with Trance Wax)(UNITY project)
- 2020 "Our Moon" (featuring Lovlee)
- 2020 "Free" (with Trance Unity)(UNITY project)
- 2021 "Bloodstream" (with Ruben de Ronde)
- 2021 "Glow" (with Tom Staar featuring Darla Jade)
- 2021 "Trust You" (with Leon Bolier featuring Nblm)
- 2021 "Lemme Take You"
- 2021 "Poison" (featuring Lovlee)
- 2021 "For Your Mind"
- 2022 "Wounded" (with Morgan Page featuring Cara Melín)
- 2022 "Here Comes Love" (with We Are Loud)
- 2022 "You Can't Stop Me"
- 2022 "Hades Can't Stop Me" (with Crowd+Ctrl)
- 2023 "Connect" (from Connect)
- 2023 "Mind Trip" (from Connect)
- 2023 "Yes Man" (from Connect)
- 2023 "Stay Awake" (featuring Diandra Faye) (from Connect)
- 2024 "Fulfillment" (with Marsh) (from Connect)
- 2024 "Where the Mountains Grow" (featuring Chris Howard) (from Connect)
- 2024 "Belong to You" (with 22Bullets and featuring Couche) (from Connect)
- 2024 "Just Breathe" (from Connect)
- 2024 "Chaos" (with Silva City) (from Connect)
- 2024 "Total Eclipse" (featuring Chris Howard) (from Connect)
- 2024 "Remember" (with SUPERSTRINGS) (from Connect)
- 2024 "Chain Reaction" (featuring MERYLL) (from Connect)
- 2024 "Back to Life" (with Tom Westy) (from Connect)
- 2026 Blueprint: Reprinted EP
- 2026 Don't Be Afraid (with Joris Voorn)
- 2026 Attraction (with Marsh)

=== Aliases ===
A Jolly Good Fellow:

- 1995 "Dancing Sparks"
- 1996 "Killer Beats"
- 1996 "My Bass"

Albion:

- 1997 "Reach for the Sky"
- 1998 "Air"
- 2000 "Air 2000" – #59 UK

Bypass:

- 1996 "Cyberia"

Cyber F:

- 2005 "The Midnight Sun"

Dance Therapy:

- 2023 "Crying at the Discotheque" (with Lizot and Fat Tony)

Digital Control:

- 2000 "Dreams Last for Long"

DJ Sno-White:

- 1996 "Mary's Boy" / "Rave Child" (from Santa's X-Mas Dance Party)

Eon:

- 2002 "Pocket Damage"
- 2018 "Knocker"

Exiter:

- 1995 "Eyes in the Sky"
- 1997 "The Lizard"

Ferr:

- 1996 "Legend" (from Looking Forward)
- 1996 "Midnight Moods" / "NightTime Experience" (from Looking Forward)
- 1997 "Stardust"
- 2018 "Encounters" (from As Above So Below)
- 2019 "Gravity Waves" (with Geronimo Snijtsheuvel) (from As Above So Below)
- 2019 "Beyond the North Wind" (from As Above So Below)
- 2019 "Closer" (from As Above So Below)
- 2020 "Dark Water" (from As Above So Below)
- 2020 "Sehnsucht" / "When Thoughts Become You" (from As Above So Below)
- 2020 "Evenfall"
- 2021 "Limbo" (with Richard Walters)
- 2021 "Hands" (with Youth Novels)

Festen:

- 2012 "Bace in Yer Fass"
- 2012 "Wassup Vegas"
- 2012 "Kazooka"
- 2012 "Give it to Them"

Firmly Undaground:

- 1997 "Hide & Seek"

Free Inside

- 1994 "Underground"
- 1995 "Never Felt (This Way)"

Kinky Toys:

- 1997 "Carpe Diem"
- 1997 "Somewhere Out There (Aliens Are Lurking)"

Lunalife:

- 1996 "Lunalife"

Moonman:

- 1996 "Don't Be Afraid" – #60 UK
- 1996 "Galaxia"
- 1997 "First Light"
- 1999 "Don't Be Afraid '99" – #41 UK
- 2000 "Galaxia"– #50 UK

Party Cruiser:

- 1996 "This Record Is Being Played in Clubs, Discolounges, House- Basement- or Blockparties"

Pulp Victim:

- 1997 "Dreams Last for Long"
- 1997 "I'm Losing Control"
- 1998 "The World"

Pulse:

- 2010 "Rendition"

Raya Shaku:

- 1996 "The Rising Sun"

Sidewinder:

- 1998 "Mindsensations"

Skywalker:

- 1996 Seed

System F:

- 1999 "Out of the Blue" (from Out of the Blue) – #14 UK
- 2000 "Cry" (from Out of the Blue) – #19 UK
- 2000 Unplugged, Mixed & Motion (from Out of the Blue)
- 2001 "Exhale" (featuring Armin van Buuren) (from Out of the Blue)
- 2001 "Soul On Soul" (featuring Marc Almond) (from Out of the Blue)
- 2001 "Dance Valley Theme 2001" (from Together)
- 2002 "Needle Juice" (from Out of the Blue)
- 2002 "Solstice" (from Out of the Blue)
- 2003 "Together" (from Together)
- 2003 "Spread Your Wings (from Together)
- 2003 "Spaceman" (from Together)
- 2004 "Ignition, Sequence, Start!" (from Together)
- 2005 "Reaching Your Soul" (from Together)
- 2007 "Insolation" (from Out of the Blue)
- 2022 "Adagio for Strings"

The Nutter:

- 1996 "Gimme Your Love"

Zenithal:

- 1992 Sssshhhht EP
- 1996 "Alasca" / "Famosa"

=== Groups ===
==== With Robert Smit ====
2HD:

- 1998 "Sunflakes"
- 1998 "High Density"

Alter Native:

- 1995 "Joy Factory"
- 1996 I Feel Good E.P.
- 1997 "The Warning"

Blade Racer:

- 1996 Master Blaster Party E.P.

Block:

- 1996 "Da Bazz"

Boogie Box:

- 1997 "On the Move"Double Dutch:
- 1998 "Here We Go...!"Elektrika:
- 1998 "It Makes Me Move"

Double Dutch:

- 1998 "Here We Go...!"

Elektrika:

- 1998 "It Makes Me Move"

Energiya:

- 1997 "Straight Kickin'" / "Tomba Dance"

Roef:

- 1997 "Outthere"

Scum:

- 1994 "Your Gun"

Selected Worx:

- 1998 Volume 1

Sons of Aliens:

- 1994 "Intruders"
- 1994 "Welcome to Dew. Lokh"
- 1995 "In Love E.P."

Spirit of Adventure (with John Matze and René de Ruyter):

- 1991 Spirit of Adventure

Starparty:

- 1997 "I'm in Love" – #26 UK (2000 release)

Tellurians (with John Matze and René de Ruyter):

- 1992 Illustrator E.P.
- 1992 Spirit of Adventure (The Remix E.P.)
- 1996 "The Navigator"

==== With others ====
A.N.Y. (with Hans van Hemert):

- 1995 "Don't You Want Me"

Discodroids (with Peter Nijborn):

- 1996 "The Show"
- 1997 "Interspace"
- 1998 "Energy"

Embrace (with Raz Nitzan):

- 2008 "Embrace"

FB (with Benny Benassi):

- 2005 "Who's Knockin'?" (featuring Edun)

Fernick (with Nick Kazemian):

- 1996 "What Would You Like Me to Do"
- 1998 "Haus"

Gouryella (with Tiësto until "Ligaya", after which it was a solo project):

- 1998 "Gouryella" – #15 UK
- 1999 "Walhalla" – #27 UK
- 2000 "Tenshi" – #45 UK
- 2002 "Ligaya" (from Together)
- 2015 "Anahera" (from From the Heavens)
- 2016 "Neba" (from From the Heavens)
- 2016 From the Heavens EP
- 2017 "Venera (Vee's Theme)" (from Blueprint)
- 2019 "Surga"
- 2021 "Orenda"
- 2025 "Marama (Moon & Stars)"

Mind to Mind (with Piet Bervoets):

- 1997 "Music is My Life"

New World Punx (with Markus Schulz):

- 2013 "Romper"
- 2014 "Pullover"
- 2014 "Torque"
- 2015 "Memories" (featuring Cara Salimando)
- 2015 "Bang"

Nixieland (with Piet Bervoets):

- 1998 "All I Need, All I Want"

Penetrator (with Piet Bervoets):

- 1997 "Love Entry"

Project Aurora (with Lucien Foort and Ron Matser):

- 1999 "Sinners"

Riptide (with Piet Bervoets):

- 1997 "Going Back"

Soundcheck (with André van den Bosch):

- 1999 "Minddrive" / "Funck Battery"

Veracocha (with Vincent de Moor):

- 1999 "Carte Blanche" – #22 UK

Vimana (with Tiësto):

- 1999 "We Came" / "Dreamtime"

== Remixes ==
- #
  - 2 Brothers on the 4th Floor – "Do You Know?" (Dance Therapy Remix)
  - 2 Brothers on the 4th Floor – "I'm Thinkin' of U" (Dance Therapy Remix)
  - 2 Brothers on the 4th Floor – "The Sun Will Be Shining" (Dance Threrapy Remix)
  - 2 Brothers on the 4th Floor – "There's a Key" (Dance Threrapy Remix)
  - 2 Brothers on the 4th Floor – "Where You're Going To?" (Dance Therapy Remix)
- A
  - Albion – "Air 2000" (Ferry Corsten's Open Air Remix)
  - Alexis Jordan – "Acid Rain" (Ferry Corsten Remix)
  - Alter Native – "I Feel Good" (A Jolly Good Remix)
  - Ami Suzuki – "Around the World" (Ferry Corsten Remix)
  - Ami Suzuki – "Fantastic" (Ferry Corsten Remix)
  - Analogue Sound Department – "Greetings" (Ferry Corsten Edit)
  - Apoptygma Berzerk – "Kathy's Song" (Come Lie Next To Me) (Ferry Corsten Remix)
  - Arkadia – "Now" (Moonman Remix)
  - Armand van Helden – "Witch Doktor" (Free Inside Remix)
  - Armin van Buuren featuring Cathy Burton – "Rain" (FERR By Ferry Corsten Rework)
  - Art of Trance – "Madagascar" (Ferry Corsten Remix)
  - Atlantic Ocean – "The Cycle of Life" (Discodroids Remix)
  - Aven – "All I Wanna Do" (Ferry Corsten Remix)
  - Ayla – "Ayla" (Veracocha Remix)
  - Ayumi Hamasaki – "A Song for XX" (Ferry Corsten Chilled Mix)
  - Ayumi Hamasaki – "Connected" (Ferry Corsten Remix)
  - Ayumi Hamasaki – "Kanariya" (System F remix)
  - Ayumi Hamasaki – "Whatever" (System F Remix)
  - Azzido Da Bass – "Dooms Night" (Timo Maas Remix) (Ferry Corsten Edit)
- B
  - Ballyhoo featuring Xandra – "Feelin' Good" (Cada Club Mix)
  - BBE – "Seven Days and One Week" (Ferry Corsten Remix)
  - Béatrice Marquez – "All I Wanna Do" (Ferry Corsten Remix)
  - Betsie Larkin & Ferry Corsten – "Stars" (Ferry Fix)
  - Binary Finary – "1999" (Gouryella Remix)
  - Bizarre Supreme – "My Mind" (Free Inside Remix)
  - Blackwater – "Deep Down" (Dance Therapy Mix)
  - Blank & Jones – "Flying to the Moon" (Moonman Remix)
  - Bobina – "Invisible Touch" (Ferry Corsten's Touch)
  - Bose – "Eso No" (Ferry Corsten Remix)
  - BT featuring JC Chasez – "The Force of Gravity" (Ferry Corsten Bootleg Remake)
  - BT – "Suddenly" (Ferry Corsten Remix)
- C
  - Cascade – "Transcend (Moonman's Trancedental Flight Remix)
  - Ceremony X featuring Enrico – "Planet of Dreams (Keep It Live)" (Kinky Toys Remix)
  - Chestnut – "Pot of Gold" (Ferry Corsten Remix)
  - Chiara – "Guardian Angel" (Dance Therapy Remix)
  - Chiara – "Nowhere to Run" (Moonman Remix)
  - Clasher – "Gonna Set You Free" (Roef Remix)
  - Corderoy – "Sweetest Dreams" (Ferry Corsten Remix)
  - Coco & Stonebridge – "The Beach" (Riptide's Absolute Pressure Mix)
  - Cosmic Gate – "The Truth" (Ferry Corsten Remix)
  - Crooklyn Clan vs. DJ Kool – "Here We Go Now" (Dance Therapy Remix)
  - Cygnus X – "The Orange Theme" (Moonman's Orange Juice Mix)
- D
  - Dash Berlin – "When You Were Around" (Ferry Corsten Fix)
  - De Bos – "Chase" (Pulp Victim's Chase Remix)
  - De Bos – "On the Run" (Pulp Victim Remix)
  - Desiderio – "Starlight" (Ferry Corsten Remix)
  - Digital Control – "Dreams Last for Long" (Ferry Corsten and Night & Day Remix)
  - Digital Control – "Dreams Last for Long" (Pulp Victim Extended Remix)
  - Digital Control – "Dreams Last for Long" (Vincent de Moor and Pulp Victim Remix)
  - Dim3nsion and Rama Duke – "Racing Against Time" (Ferry Corsten Edit)
  - Discodroids – "Energy" (Moonman Remix)
  - DJ Philip – "Heaven" (Moonman Remix)
  - Dreamon – "The Beat" (A Jolly Good Remix)
  - Duran Duran – "(Reach Up For the) Sunrise" (Ferry Corsten Dub Mix)
- E
  - E.F.O. – "Now" (Moonman's Flashover Mix)
  - Electrique Boutique – "Revelation" (Ferry Corsten Remix)
  - Elles de Graaf – "Show You My World" (Ferry Corsten Remix)
  - Embrace – "Embrace" (Ferry Fix)
  - Every Little Thing – "For the Moment" (Ferry Corsten Remix)
  - E'voke – "Arms of Loren" (Ferry Corsten Remix)
- F
  - F Massif – "Somebody" (Ferry Corsten Remix)
  - F-Action – "Thanks to You" (Ferry Corsten Remix)
  - Faithless featuring Boy George – "Why Go" (Ferry Corsten Remix)
  - Faithless featuring Dido – "Feelin Good" (Ferry Corsten Fix)
  - FB – "Who's Knockin'" (featuring Edun) (Ferry Corsten Remix)
  - Fearless – "Inca" (Ferry Corsten Remix)
  - Ferry Corsten – "It's Time" (Ferry Corsten's Flashover Remix)
  - Ferry Corsten – "Rock Your Body, Rock" (Ferry Corsten Remix)
  - Ferry Corsten – "Sweet Sorrow" (Ferry Corsten Fix)
  - Ferry Corsten and Johnny B – "Hear It Now" (Ferry Corsten Fix)
  - Ferry Corsten featuring Guru – "Junk" (Ferry Corsten's Flashover Remix)
  - Ferry Corsten featuring Howard Jones – "Into the Dark" (Ferry Fix)
  - Ferry Corsten featuring Lovlee – Poison (Breaks Mix)
  - Ferry Corsten featuring Shelley Harland – "Holding On" (Ferry Corsten's Flashover Remix)
  - Ferry Corsten featuring Simon Le Bon – "Fire" (Ferry Corsten's Flashover Remix)
  - Fischerspooner – "Never Win" (Benny Benassi Remix) (Ferry Corsten Recut)
  - Formologic – "My X-Perience" (Moonman Remix)
  - Freakyman – "Discobug '97 (Got The Feelin' Now)" (Dance Therapy Remix)
  - Future Breeze – "How Much Can You Take?" (Moonman's Flashover Mix)
  - Future Breeze – "Smile" (Ferry Corsten Remix)
- G
  - Girl Next Door – "Jounetsu no Daishou" (Ferry Corsten Remix)
  - Glow featuring Linda – "Let Me Fly" (Moonman Remix)
  - Gouryella – "Ligaya" (Ferry Corsten Remix)
  - Gouryella – "Walhalla" (System F 'In Walhalla' Remix)
- H
  - Haliene – "Dream in Color" (Ferry Corsten Remix)
  - Hole In One – "Amhran in 7th Phase" (Ferr's Subliminal Remix)
  - Hole In One – "Ride the Moon" (Starcruise Remix)
  - Hole In One – "Yoga Session" (The Tellurians Mix)
  - Hole In One – "(Lets') Ride the Moo"n (Ferry Corsten's Starcrusise Fix NEW [11.01 Mins])
- I
  - Imogen Heap – "Hide and Seek" (Ferry Corsten Bootleg Remix)
- J
  - Justin Bieber featuring Big Sean – "As Long As You Love Me" (Ferry Corsten Remix)
- K
  - Kai Tracid – "Conscious" (Ferry Corsten Remix)
  - Kamaya Painters – "Endless Wave" (Albion Remix)
  - Klubbheads – "Klubbhopping" (A Jolly Good Remix)
  - Kosheen – "Catch" (Ferry Corsten Remix)
- L
  - Laidback Luke featuring Jonathan Mendelsohn – "Till Tonight" (Ferry Corsten Fix)
  - Libra Presents Taylor – "Anomaly (Calling Your Name)" (Ferry Corsten Remix)/(Albion Remix)
  - Lighthouse Family – "Happy" (Ferry Corsten Remix)
  - Liquid Child – "Return of Atlantis" (Ferry Corsten Remix)
  - Love Child – "Liberta" (Moonman Remix)
  - Luis Paris – "Incantation" (Ferry Corsten & Robert Smit Remix)
- M
  - Manufactured Superstars featuring Scarlett Quinn – "Take Me Over" (Ferry Corsten Fix)
  - Marc Et Claude – "I Need Your Lovin'" (Ferry Corsten Remix)
  - Marc Et Claude – "La" (Moonman's Flashover Mix)
  - Marc Et Claude – "Ne" (Moonman's Flashover Mix)
  - Marco Borsato – "De Bestemming" (Ferry Corsten Remix)
  - Matt Darey – "Liberation (Fly Like an Angel)" (Feat. Marcella Woods) (Ferry Corsten Remix)
  - Mind One – "Hurt of Intention" (Ferry Fix)
  - Moby – "After" (Ferry Corsten Fix)
  - Moby – "In My Heart" (Ferry Corsten Remix)
  - Moby – "Why Does My Heart Feel So Bad" (Ferry Corsten Remix)
  - Moonman – "Don't Be Afraid" (Ferr Remix)
  - Moonman – "Don't Be Afraid" (Moonman Remix)
  - Moonman – "Don't Be Afraid" (System F'99 Remix)
  - Mother's Pride – "Learning to Fly" (Moonman Remix)
  - Movin' Melodies – "Fiesta Conga '98" (Dance Therapy Remix)
  - Mr. S. Oliver – "Funkin' Down the Track" (The Best DJ) (Moonman Remix)
- N
  - Nance – "Kiss It!" (Dance Therapy Remix)
  - Nelly Furtado – "Do It" (Ferry Corsten Remix)
  - Nick K – "Fluctuation" (Ferry Corsten Remix)
- O
  - Oceanlab featuring Justine Suissa – "Clear Blue Water" (Ferry Corsten Remix)
- P
  - Paradiso – "Shine" (Dance Therapy Club Mix)
  - Peplab – "Welcome to the Bear" (Ferry Corsten Remix)
  - PF Project featuring Ewan McGregor – "Choose Life" (Ferry Corsten Remix)
  - Pirate featuring Bob Dylan – "Leaving the Sun" (Ferry Corsten Remix)
  - Pulp Victim – "The World '99" (Moonman Remix)
  - Purple Stories – "Path to Nowhere" (Ferry Corsten Edit)
  - Push – "Universal Nation 1999" (Ferry Corsten Remix)
- R
  - R.O.O.S. – "Body, Mind & Spirit" (Dance Therapy Club Remix)
  - R.O.O.S. – "Instant Moments (Waiting For)" (Dance Therapy Club Remix)
  - Rachel – "Is It Wrong Is It Right?" (Ferry Corsten Remix)
  - Rafaël Frost – "Red" (Ferry Corsten Remix)
  - Rainy City Music – "Deep Space (The Discovery)" (The Tellurians Remix)
  - Ramin Djawadi – "Prison Break Theme" (Ferry Corsten Breakout Mix)
  - Rank 1 – "Awakening" (Ferry Corsten Remix)
  - Ransom – "My Dance" (Ferry Corsten Remix)
  - Raya Shaku – "The Rising Sun" (Ferr Remix)
  - Roger Goode – "In the Beginning Again" (Ferry Corsten Remix)
  - Ronald Clark – "Speak to Me" (Rainy City's Tellurian Revamp Mix)
- S
  - Selected Worx – "Downforce" (Sidewinder Mix)
  - Sex U All – "Nasty Girl" (Nasty Groove Mix)
  - Shiny Toy Guns – "Le Disko" (Ferry Corsten Mix)
  - Sidney Samson – "Blasted" (Ferry Corsten Remix)
  - Snow Patrol – "New York" (Ferry Corsten Remix)
  - Solange – "Messages" (Gouryella Remix)
  - Solarstone & Alucard – "Late Summer Fields" (Ferry Corsten Remix)
  - Starparty – "I'm In Love" (Ferry Corsten Remix)
  - Starparty – "I'm In Love" (Ferry Corsten & Robert Smit Remix)
  - Stonebridge – "Freak On" featuring Ultra Nate (Ferry Corsten Remix)
  - Subsola – "So Pure" (Ferry Corsten Remix)
  - Sundance – "Sundance" (Moonman Remix)
  - System F – "Cry" (DotNL Mix)
  - System F – "Cry" (Ferry Corsten Club Remix)
  - System F – "Insolation" (Ferry Corsten's Flashover Remix)
  - System F – "Out of the Blue" (System F's 5AM Remix)
  - System F vs. Cosmic Gate – "The Blue Theme" (Ferry Corsten Fix)
- T
  - Techno Matic – "It's Time to Party" (Spirit Of Adventure Remix)
  - Telex – "Radio Radio" (The Tellurians Mix)
  - The Gatekeepers – "Widdeldiduu" (Roef Mix)
  - The Generator – "Where Are You Now" (Moonman Remix)
  - The Killers – "Human" (Ferry Corsten Club Mix)
  - The Space Brothers – "Forgiven (I Feel Your Love)" (Pulp Victim Remix)
  - The Space Brothers – "This Is Love" (Ferry Corsten Mix)
  - The Tellurians – "Space Is the Space" (Barbarella Strikes Back Mix)
  - The Tellurians – "Space Is the Space" (Deep Space Is the Place Mix)
  - The Thrillseekers – "Synaesthesia 2004" (Ferry Corsten Remix)
  - The Timeless Love on Orchestra – "I Feel Love" (The Tellurians House Mix)
  - Tiësto featuring Jónsi – "Kaleidoscope" (Ferry Corsten Remix)
  - Tony Walker – "Field of Joy" (Ferry Corsten Remix)
  - Topcat – "Chicago" (Pulp Victim Remake)
  - Trance Induction – "ET Welcome Song '99" (Ferry Corsten Remix)
  - Two Phunky People – "DJ Killa!" (Moonman Remix)
- U
  - U2 – "New Year's Day" (Ferry Corsten Remix)
- V
  - Vanessa Aman – "Wishin' On a Star" (Drum N' Bass Therapy Mix)
  - Vincent de Moor – "Orion City" (Moonman's Drift Remix)
- W
  - Waldo – "The Look" (Cada's Jungle Mix)
  - We Are Loud featuring Katie DiCicco – "On the Run" (Ferry Corsten Remix)
  - William Orbit – "Barber's Adagio for Strings" (Ferry Corsten Remix)
  - William Orbit – "Clavier" (Ferry Corsten Remix)
  - William Orbit – "Ravel's Pavane Pour Une Infante Defunte" (Ferry Corsten Remix)
- Y
  - Yoji Biomehanika – "Theme from Bangin' Globe" (System F Remix)
  - Yosh presents @-Large – "Groundshaker" (Discodroids Remix)

This is not a complete list of remixes.

== Aliases ==
This list contains the names of the known aliases used by Ferry Corsten.

- 4x4
- A Jolly Good Fellow
- Albion
- Bypass
- Cyber F
- Dance Therapy
- Delaquente
- DJ Sno-White
- Digital Control
- DotNL
- East West
- Eon
- Exiter
- Farinha
- Ferr
- Festen
- Firmly Underground
- Free Inside
- Funk Einsatz
- Gouryella
- Kinky Toys
- Lunalife
- Moonman
- Party Cruiser
- Pulp Victim
- Pulse
- Raya Shaku
- Sidewinder
- Skywalker
- System F
- The Nutter
- Vimana
- Zenithal

== Groups and collaborations ==
This list contains the names of various groups Ferry Corsten has been a member of in collaborations with other artists.

- 2HD (with Robert Smit)
- Alter Native (with Robert Smit)
- A.N.Y. (with Hans van Hemert)
- Blade Racer (with Robert Smit)
- Block (with Robert Smit)
- Boogie Box (with Robert Smit)
- Cada (with Robert Smit)
- Discodroids (with Peter Nijborn)
- Double Dutch (with Robert Smit)
- Elektrika (with Robert Smit)
- Embrace (with Raz Nitzan)
- Energiya (with Robert Smit)
- FB (with Benny Benassi)
- LoCo (with Joeri Lodders)
- Fernick (with Nick Kazemian)
- G-Freak (with Robert Smit)
- Gouryella (originally with Tiësto, now solely Ferry Corsten)
- Mind To Mind (with Piet Bervoets)
- New World Punx (with Markus Schulz)
- Nixieland (with Piet Bervoets)
- Penetrator (with Piet Bervoets)
- Project Aurora (with Lucien Foort & Ron Matser)
- Riptide (with Piet Bervoets)
- Roef (with Robert Smit)
- S.O.A (with Robert Smit & René de Ruyter)
- Scum (with Robert Smit)
- Selected Worx (with Robert Smit)
- Sons of Aliens (with Robert Smit)
- Soundcheck (with Andre van den Bosch)
- Spirit of Adventure (with Robert Smit, John Matze & René de Ruyter)
- Starparty (with Robert Smit)
- The Hot Wind Blowing (with Jamie Christopherson)
- The Tellurians (with Robert Smit, John Matze and René de Ruyter)
- Veracocha (with Vincent De Moor)
- Vimana (with Tiësto)
