= Blueprint (Ferry Corsten album) =

Studio album (Concept) by Ferry Corsten
- Released: 26 May 2017
- Genre: Trance, ambient
- Length: 89:08
- Label: Flashover Recordings
- Producer: Ferry Corsten; Matthew Steeper; Tony Verdult; Pete Nappi

Ferry Corsten chronology
WKND (2012)	Blueprint (2017)	Connect (2024)

Singles from Blueprint
- 1. "Venera (Vee's Theme)" Released: 7 April 2017; 2. "Reanimate" Released: 30 June 2017; 3. "Waiting" Released: 29 September 2017; 4. "Trust" Released: 30 October 2017; 5. "Wherever You Are" Released: 24 November 2017

Blueprint is the fifth studio album by Dutch trance artist Ferry Corsten, released on 26 May 2017 though Flashover Recordings. It is a science fiction-influenced trance album with tracks containing a storyline narrated by American actor Campbell Scott. The plot narrative, which is unfolded at the beginning of each song, depicts humans on Earth who begin to hear an endlessly repeating sound emitted from space and the creation of an android by a man who had deciphered the sound's hidden message.

The album features a single from Corsten's side project "Gouryella" titled "Venera (Vee's Theme)", which was the first single released to promote the album. Along with "Venera (Vee's Theme)", four other singles were released with the album, "Reanimate", "Trust", "Waiting", and "Wherever You Are". Blueprint received positive reception from music critics, who praised the album's overall sound design and emotional listening experience evoked by each track.

== Background ==
Unlike Ferry Corsten's earlier albums, Blueprint is a concept album whose concept is based on a science fiction-themed love story. According to Ferry, the initial inspiration for creating a narrative-focused album came from his father reminding him of Jeff Wayne's Musical Version of The War of the Worlds, an album that they used to listen together. Like the main concept of Blueprint, it is a progressive rock and symphonic rock album which contains narratives from Welsh actor Richard Burton. "As a kid, I grew up looking at the vinyls with all the artwork and paintings of these aliens and stuff. I was fascinated by it!" When Ferry's father reminded him of the old album, a lightbulb went off: "You just said the magic words, I told him. You just gave me an idea," recounted Ferry.

Being a science fiction fan since his younger days, Ferry decided to base the theme of Blueprint on that very concept. "Ever since I was a little kid, I’ve been a big sci-fi fan. The interest in the unknown and what lies beyond that always grabbed me. For this project I had a chance to work with both my favourite interests, sci-fi and music," said Ferry. The storyline was written by Hollywood screenwriter David H. Miller (aka D.M. Harring), who was introduced to Ferry by his manager. "We hit it off very well and working together was easy and fun. The flow was fantastic," said Ferry. Blueprint contains illustrations from Canadian visual artist Oska, and is narrated by actor Campbell Scott.

== Critical reception ==
Blueprint was met with generally positive reviews upon release. Dancing Astronaut’s Kanvar Kohli complimented the usage of voice-overs for most of the tracks and highlighted the strength of the album's science-fiction theme. He also praised Corsten for capturing the album's other-worldly sound design. Shivani Murthy from The Music Essentials states that the album, "has been impeccably conceptualized and executed with absolute perfection", giving listeners an ‘‘out of the world’’ experience. Shawn Russel Johnson from HuffPost described Blueprint as a "display of the artist's mastery of the trance genre", capable of manipulating the emotions of listeners with every track.

== Track listing ==
=== Disc one ===
No.	Title	Writer(s)	Producer(s)	Length
1.	"Reception"	Ferry Corsten; Han Kooreneef; Martijn Spierenburg	Ferry Corsten	2:21
2.	"Blueprint"	Ferry Corsten	Ferry Corsten	5:21
3.	"Your Face" (featuring Eric Lumiere)	Eric Lumiere; Ferry Corsten; Kelly Sweet; Matthew Steeper; Menno Reyntjes	Ferry Corsten; Matthew Steeper; Tony Verdult	4:08
4.	"Venera (Vee's Theme)" (as Gouryella)	Ferry Corsten	Ferry Corsten	5:14
5.	"Something To Believe In" (featuring Eric Lumiere)	David Sneddon; Ferry Corsten; Kimberly Anne Sutherland	Ferry Corsten	4:54
6.	"Waiting" (featuring Niels Geusebroek)	Ferry Corsten; Niels Geusebroek	Ferry Corsten; Tony Verdult	4:42
7.	"Here We Are" (featuring Haliene)	Laura Brehm; Ferry Corsten; Joe Killington; Kelly Sweet; Matthew Steeper; Yk Koi	Ferry Corsten; Matthew Steeper	5:01
8.	"Edge of the Sky" (featuring Haliene)	Ferry Corsten; Karra Madden; Kelly Sweet; Matthew Steeper	Ferry Corsten; Matthew Steeper	4:07
9.	"A World Beyond"	Ferry Corsten	Ferry Corsten	9:43
Total length:				45:31

=== Disc two ===
No.	Title	Writer(s)	Producer(s)	Length
1.	"Trust"	Ferry Corsten	Ferry Corsten	6:19
2.	"Lonely Inside"	Ferry Corsten	Ferry Corsten	5:12
3.	"Piece of You" (featuring Haliene)	Ferry Corsten; Kelly Sweet; Matthew Steeper	Ferry Corsten; Matthew Steeper	4:25
4.	"Wherever You Are" (featuring Haliene)	Ferry Corsten; Kelly Sweet; Matthew Steeper	Ferry Corsten; Matthew Steeper	6:29
5.	"Drum's A Weapon"	Ferry Corsten	Ferry Corsten	5:50
6.	"Reanimate" (featuring Clairity)	Claire Wilkinson; Ferry Corsten; Pete Nappi	Ferry Corsten; Pete Nappi	4:13
7.	"Another Sunrise" (featuring Eric Lumiere & Haliene)	Eric Lumiere; Ferry Corsten; Renske Taminiau; Vincent van Reeken	Ferry Corsten; Matthew Steeper	4:50
8.	"Eternity" (featuring Bagga Bownz)	Ferry Corsten; Stijn Versteeg	Ferry Corsten	6:19
Total length:				43:37

== Personnel ==
Credits adapted from Discogs and AllMusic

Technical and composing credits

- Ferry Corsten – primary artist, composer, producer
- Claire Wilkinson - featured artist
- Tony Verdult - producer (vocals)
- Niels Geusebroek - featured artist, writer, composer
- Matthew Steeper - producer (vocals), writer, composer
- Pete Nappi - producer (vocals)
- Yk Koi - writer, composer
- Kelly Sweet - featured artist, writer, composer
- Eric Lumiere - featured artist, writer, composer
- Han Kooreneef - writer, composer
- Martijn Spierenburg - writer, composer
- Menno Reyntjes - writer, composer
- David Sneddon - writer, composer
- Kimberly Anne Sutherland - writer, composer
- Joe Killington - writer, composer
- Laura Brehm - writer, composer
- Karra Madden - writer, composer
- Renske Taminiau - writer, composer
- Vincent van Reeken - writer, composer
- Stijn Versteeg - writer, composer

Artwork credits

- Oska - artist

Story credits

- Campbell Scott - narrator
- David Harrington Miller - writer (story)

== Charts ==
Chart (2017)	Peak; position
US Dance/Electronic Albums (Billboard)	7
Dutch Compilations (MegaCharts)	190

== Release history ==
Region	Date	Format	Label	Reference
Worldwide	26 May 2017	Digital download	Flashover Recordings	
Worldwide	2 June 2017	CD	Flashover Recordings	
Worldwide	December 2018	Pure Audio Blu-ray	Flashover Recordings	

== See also ==
- Ferry Corsten discography
