= Twice in a Blue Moon =

Studio album by Ferry Corsten
- Released: 1 November 2008
- Genre: Trance
- Length: 1:10:08
- Label: Flashover
- Producer: Ferry Corsten

Ferry Corsten chronology
| L.E.F. (2006) | Twice in a Blue Moon (2008) | WKND (2012) |

Singles from Twice in a Blue Moon
- 1. "Brain Box" Released: September 2007; 2. "Radio Crash" Released: October 2008; 3. "Made of Love" Released: February 2009; 4. "We Belong" Released: May 2009

Professional ratings
Review scores
| Source | Rating |
|---|---|
| BBC | Favourable |
| Halesowen News | 5/10 |
| The Music Fix | 5/10 |
| Random.Access | 7.2/10 |
| Trance.nu | Favourable |

Twice in a Blue Moon is the third studio album by Dutch trance artist Ferry Corsten, released on 1 November 2008 at his second edition of the "Full on Ferry" gig. 3 November 2008 was the official release date to purchase the album outside the "Full on Ferry" gig. The first single released from the album was "Brain Box" in 2007, before Twice in a Blue Moon was even announced.

The album is inspired by many goings on in Corsten's life, including the birth of his daughter, Gabriella. The album got its title from a television program about roses Corsten was watching, which featured a rose called 'Twice in a Blue Moon', with Corsten knowing that "once in a blue moon" is a saying about something that only seldom happens. He also stated that he felt the title was fitting because of the birth of his new daughter, and also having his wife's love. The love of these two people was considered so special by Corsten that 'Twice in a Blue Moon' was considered an appropriate title.

The album has gone through various changes, including tracks such as "Made of Love", which originally never featured vocals. Corsten decided to add vocals after playing the track live a few times as Corsten does to test some new songs.

Twice in a Blue Moon represents a new step in Corsten's sound and a new style transition from his previous album L.E.F.. The latter was more of a protest against trance music due to its predictability, thus resulting in a more electronic-sounding and electro-styled album. Regarding the album cover of Twice in a Blue Moon, Corsten's trademark 'F' logo (with the 'F' standing for his first name Ferry) was used to make the album stand out and fit the style of the music featured on the album. This also makes it easily recognizable to fans, old and new.

== Track listing ==
| No. | Title | Length |
|---|---|---|
| 1. | "Shelter Me" | 5:49 |
| 2. | "Black Velvet" (feat. Julia Messenger) | 5:43 |
| 3. | "We Belong" (feat. Maria Nayler) | 7:58 |
| 4. | "Gabriella's Sky" | 7:03 |
| 5. | "Made of Love" (feat. Betsie Larkin) | 8:58 |
| 6. | "Radio Crash" | 7:20 |
| 7. | "Twice in a Blue Moon" | 7:32 |
| 8. | "Feel You" (feat. Betsie Larkin) | 5:17 |
| 9. | "Life" (feat. Ben Cullum) | 6:15 |
| 10. | "Brain Box" | 8:10 |
| 11. | "Shanti" | 7:06 |
| 12. | "Visions of Blue" | 2:11 |

== Releases ==
| Singles & album | Release date | Release format(s) |
|---|---|---|
| "Brain Box" | Released on 10 September 2007 | Vinyl / CD / Digital |
| "Radio Crash" | Released on 13 October 2008 | Vinyl / CD / Digital |
| Twice in a Blue Moon (album) | Released on 1 November 2008 (@ Full on Ferry 2nd Edition), 3 November in shops | CD / Digital |
| "Made of Love" | Released on 8 February 2009 | Vinyl / CD / Digital |
| "We Belong" | Released on 11 May 2009 | CD / Digital |

== Single releases and remixes/re-edits ==
| Singles | Remixes/re-edits |
|---|---|
| "Brain Box" | Album Version / Extended Mix |
| "Radio Crash" | Album Version / Radio Edit / Extended Mix / House Krush / Muzikjunki Remix |
| "Made of Love" | Album Version / Radio Edit / Extended Mix / Duderstadt Progressive Remix / Duderstadt Progressive Dub / Bobina Megadrive Vox / Bobina Megadrive Dub / Push Remix / Super8 & Tab Remix / 5AM Dub |
| "We Belong" | Album Version / Radio Edit / Extended Mix / Muzikjunki Full Vocal Mix / Muzikjunki Dubmix / Tritonal Air Up There Remix / Bingo Players Remix / Bingo Players Dub |

== Work during the Twice in a Blue Moon period ==
- Corsten did the "Full on Ferry" gig on 1 November 2008.
- Corsten remixed the track "Human" by The Killers.
- On Wednesday 29 October 2008 Corsten presented a one-hour "Twice in a Blue Moon Special" on his weekly radio show Corsten's Countdown.

== Charts ==
| Chart (2008) | Peak position |
|---|---|
| Dutch Albums (Album Top 100) | 23 |

== See also ==
- Ferry Corsten discography
