= WKND (album) =

Studio album by Ferry Corsten
- Released: 21 February 2012
- Genres: Uplifting trance; progressive trance; progressive house
- Labels: (Netherlands) Flashover Recordings (United Kingdom) New State Music (United States) Ultra Records
- Producer: Ferry Corsten

Ferry Corsten chronology
Twice in a Blue Moon (2008)	WKND (2012)	Blueprint (2017)

Singles from WKND
- 1. "Feel It" Released: 18 April 2011; 2. "Check It Out" Released: 11 July 2011; 3. "Brute" Released: 12 September 2011; 4. "Ain't No Stoppin'" Released: 12 February 2012; 5. "Live Forever" Released: 28 May 2012; 6. "Not Coming Down" Released: 17 September 2012; 7. "Love Will" Released: 28 January 2013

Professional ratings
Review scores
Source	Rating
Allmusic	3.5/5 stars
About.com	5/5 stars
United States Trance Movement	Favourable

WKND (Weekend) is an electronic dance music album released by Ferry Corsten digitally on 21 February 2012, and physically in the Netherlands on 24 February, in the UK on 27 February and in the US on 27 March. It is his fourth studio album released under his own name.

== Track listing ==
No.	Title	Length
1.	"A Day Without Rain" (featuring Ellie Lawson)	6:29
2.	"Feel It"	6:17
3.	"Ain't No Stoppin'" (featuring Ben Hague)	6:18
4.	"Don't Be Afraid"	5:01
5.	"Not Coming Down" (featuring Betsie Larkin)	8:23
6.	"Brute" (vs. Armin van Buuren)	8:34
7.	"Live Forever" (featuring Aruna)	6:48
8.	"Let You Go" (featuring Sarah Bettens)	3:27
9.	"Check It Out"	6:56
10.	"Love Will" (featuring Duane Harden)	5:56
11.	"In Your Eyes" (featuring JES)	5:03
12.	"Walk on Air" (featuring Pierre in the Air and Amba Shepherd)	5:36
13.	"Take Me"	7:04
14.	"WKND"	5:12
15.	"Sunday" (bonus track)	4:19

iTunes Store deluxe edition
No.	Title	Length
16.	"Check It Out" (music video)	3:03
17.	"Brute" (vs. Armin van Buuren, music video)	3:38
18.	"Ain't No Stoppin'" (featuring Ben Hague, music video)	3:03
19.	"The Making of Ain't No Stoppin'" (video)	3:01

== Charts ==
Chart (2012–2013)	Peak position
Dutch Albums (Album Top 100)	51
UK Albums (OCC)	199

== See also ==
- Ferry Corsten discography
