= Watch Out =

Watch Out may refer to:

== Film and fiction ==
- Watch Out (film), a 2008 film by Steve Balderson
- Watch Out (1999 film), a film featuring Chin Kar-lok
- Watch Out, a 2006 novel by Joseph Suglia, basis for the 2008 film
- Watch Out (1953 film), a 1953 CFF short film starring Peter Butterworth

== Music ==
=== Albums ===
- Watch Out! (Alexisonfire album), 2004
- Watch Out (Alla Pugacheva album) or the title song, 1985
- Watch Out (Barrabás album), 1975
- Watch Out! (Lovex album) or the title song, 2011
- Watch Out (Patrice Rushen album) or the title song, 1987
- Watch Out (René McLean album) or the title song, 1975
- Watch Out, by Blockheads, 1998
- Watch Out, by Brandi Wells, or the title song, 1981

=== Songs ===
- "Watch Out" (2 Chainz song), 2015
- "Watch Out" (Alex Gaudino song), 2008
- "Watch Out" (Ferry Corsten song), 2006
- "Watch Out", by ABBA from Waterloo, 1974
- "Watch Out", by Atmosphere from You Can't Imagine How Much Fun We're Having, 2005
- "Watch Out", by Chris Cornell from Scream, 2009
- "Watch Out", by David Gates from Never Let Her Go, 1975
- "Watch Out", by De La Soul from AOI: Bionix, 2001
- "Watch Out", by Dean Parrish, B-side of the single "I'm on My Way", 1967
- "Watch Out", by Fat Joe, Big Pun, Armageddon & Keith Nut, from Jealous One's Envy
- "Watch Out", by Fleetwood Mac from The Original Fleetwood Mac, 1971
- "Watch Out", by Jackie Wilson, 1964
- "Watch Out", by Loverboy from Get Lucky, 1981
