= Out of the Blue (System F song) =

- The cover of the Dutch 12" Tsunami release

Single by System F

from the album Out of the Blue
- B-side: "Lucien's Big Trance Mix"; "Super Secret"; "Angelz Remix"
- Released: 9 March 1999 (Netherlands): 22 March 1999 (UK)
- Recorded: 1998
- Genre: Trance
- Length: 6:41 (original); 3:51 (radio edit)
- Label: Tsunami
- Songwriter: Ferry Corsten
- Producer: Ferry Corsten

System F singles chronology
"Out of the Blue" (1999)	"Cry" (2000)

"Out of the Blue" is a 1999 trance single by Dutch DJ Ferry Corsten, under the alias of System F. It received an original release in the Netherlands under Corsten's own record label, Tsunami, and a full release in the UK with Essential Recordings. It reached number 14 on the UK Singles Chart and entered the Top 40 in the Netherlands. It is often regarded not only as Corsten's "breakout" hit, but as a seminal release in trance music.

== Background ==
Ferry Corsten had been releasing music under various aliases since 1991, many of which were not trance releases. In 1996, he began releasing trance music under the aliases of Ferr and Moonman. He also began releasing trance with other people as a group, typically with Robert Smit, who had co-founded the Tsunami record label with him.

Trance music was becoming hugely popular throughout Europe in 1998, with releases entering the top 5 in many countries, and some singles reaching number 1. Up to this point, Corsten had not had much success in the charts, but had entered the UK Singles Top 100 with 'Air', under his alias Albion and 'Don't Be Afraid', under his alias Moonman. He also produced a remix for 'La' by Marc Et Claude in 1997, which entered the Top 40 in the UK the following year when it was released in that region.

== Production ==
"Out of the Blue" was produced by Corsten in a couple days, stating that the idea for the song came "out of the blue". The main melody used the supersaw technology from the Roland JP-8000, which Corsten would use in many of his releases following the track. The drums were programmed with a Roland TR-909, with many of the sounds being sampled using an Akai sampler, and the bass with a Yamaha DX-100, which he would also use in the production of the bass for 'Gouryella'. The track was made in Corsten's bedroom, which he had constructed his studio in.

The track was influenced by Italo-Dance, which was popular when Corsten grew up.

== Promotion and release ==
Corsten realised during the production that the track would be a huge success, and other people that he asked agreed. Because of this, the promotional releases of the track were made to be deliberately mysterious, by releasing it on single-sided white label with the name of the song and a phone number for the label stamped on it with no other information on the record, including the Matrix number, which was scratched out using a blade in order to stop people from tracing the release. The black sleeve was deliberately damaged, and by cutting out letters from newspapers and splicing them together, they used them to write on the front of the cover, "Something to blow your brains out".

Only seven copies of the white label were pressed, and they were sent to various DJs in the UK, some who worked with A&R at major dance labels in the UK. The reason only seven copies were pressed was because Corsten and his team at Tsunami believed doing so would create more "buzz" around the track. This tactic worked, as various labels called Tsunami to sign the track, including Red Jerry of Hooj Choons, who hadn't been sent the release but had heard it from Nick Warren, who had received the release and called Jerry to talk to him about it. Pete Tong, who founded and owned Essential Recordings, told Corsten and his team to meet at Amsterdam Airport Schiphol, where they would sign the record to Essential. Tong later said that when he heard the track for the first time, he "thought it was a hit".

The promo would be re-released on a second white label, and after around 6 months of the track only being available on promo release, it was released throughout Europe in early 1999. Pete Tong would start playing the song in November 1998 and after its release on his Essential Selection radio show, which was a major source of dance music throughout the UK. He declared the song the 'Essential New Tune of the Week' on his radio show on 13 November 1998.

Following the release, the song charted at 14 in the UK Singles chart and at number two in the UK Dance Singles chart. In Corsten's home country, the Netherlands, the track charted at 29 and 30 in the Dutch Top 40 and Single Top 100 respectively. Corsten's career in the UK took off as a result of this track and others that he put out following it, however he didn't get as much attention in the Netherlands. Ministry of Sound would soon after ask Corsten to compile and mix the 'Trance Nation' compilation due to the hype around the track at the time. Corsten would mix another five Trance Nation CDs. Two years after the release of "Out of the Blue", Corsten would release the album Out of the Blue, featuring multiple other singles, such as "Cry" and "Solstice", some of which charted in the UK. Corsten also became popular in Japan following the release of the single, and as a result not only would his first System F album be released early in Japan, the following System F album, Together, would be released exclusively in Japan, although some singles were taken from the album and released in other regions.

"Out of the Blue" received several remixes upon release from Angelz, Lucien Foorta, Mauro Picotto, Corsten himself and others. Corsten would produce a "Second Edition" as a B-Side to the System F track, 'Solstice' in 2002. He would remix it again for his "Full on Ferry" show in 2007, the new mix being titled the "Violin Edit", upon its eventual release in 2010 as part of the Out of the Blue bonus disc. The "Violin" mix features an orchestral rendition of the main melody. "Out of the Blue" would be released digitally in 2010, alongside many new remixes which would be included in a 2x12" single.

== Track listing ==
1998 single-sided white label

1. Out of the Blue - 6:41

1999 Netherlands 12" release

1. Out of the Blue - 6:41
2. Out of the Blue (Lucien's Big Trance Mix) - 5:58
3. Out of the Blue (Super Secret) - 7:06

1999 Netherlands CD release

1. Out of the Blue (Short Cut) - 3:51
2. Out of the Blue (Extended Version) - 6:41
3. Out of the Blue (Angelz Remix) - 6:58
4. Out of the Blue (Super Secret) - 7:06
5. Out of the Blue (Lucien's Big Trance Mix) - 5:58

1999 UK 12" release

1. Out of the Blue (Original 12" Version) - 6:41
2. Out of the Blue (Angelz Remix) - 6:58

1999 Netherlands 12" remixes release

1. Out of the Blue (System F's 5AM Mix) - 8:47
2. Out of the Blue (Mauro Picotto Mix) - 6:43
3. Out of the Blue (Angelz Remix) - 6:58

1999 UK 12" remixes release

1. Out of the Blue (DJ Commie Rmx) - 10:08
2. Out of the Blue (Mauro Picotto Remix) - 6:43

2010 Netherlands 2x12" release

1. Out of the Blue 2010 (Giuseppe Ottaviani Remix) - 8:10
2. Out of the Blue 2010 (Stoneface & Terminal Remix) - 7:42
3. Out of the Blue 2010 (Tiësto Remix) - 9:33
4. Out of the Blue 2010 (Showtek Remix) - 6:49
5. Out of the Blue 2010 (Laidback Luke Remix) - 6:51
6. Out of the Blue 2010 (Koen Groeneveld Remix) - 7:37
7. Out of the Blue 2010 (Simon Gain Remix) - 7:08
8. Out of the Blue 2010 (Original 1999 Extended Mix) - 6:41
9. Out of the Blue 2010 (Hi_Tack Extended Mix) - 6:41
10. Out of the Blue 2010 (Violin Edit) - 8:20

== Charts ==
Weekly chart positions for "Out of the Blue"
Chart (1999)	Peak position
Belgium (Ultratop 50)	8
Germany (Official German Charts)	72
Netherlands (Dutch Top 40)	29
Netherlands (Single Top 100)	30
Scotland (OCC)	9
UK Singles (OCC)	14
UK Dance Singles (OCC)	2

Weekly chart positions for "Out of the Blue 2010"
Chart (2010)	Peak position
Netherlands (Single Top 100)	72
