= Franquet =

Franquet is a surname. Notable people with the surname include:

- Benoit Franquet, better known as Pole Folder, Belgian electronic musician and live club performer
- Sonia Franquet, Spanish sport shooter
