= Universal Religion Chapter 5 =

Compilation album by Armin van Buuren
- Released: 29 September 2011
- Genres: Trance; progressive trance; progressive house
- Length: 153:41
- Label: Armada

Armin van Buuren chronology
A State of Trance 2011 (2011)	Universal Religion Chapter 5 (2011)	A State of Trance 2012 (2012)

Singles from Universal Religion Chapter 5
- 1. "Brute" Released: 12 September 2011; 2. "Stellar" Released: 14 November 2011

Universal Religion Chapter 5 is the fifth compilation album in the Universal Religion compilation series, mixed and compiled by Dutch DJ and record producer Armin van Buuren. It was released on 29 September 2011 by Armada Music.

== Track listing ==
No.	Title	Writer(s)	Artist	Length
1.	"Vision"	Ashley Wallbridge	Ashley Wallbridge	3:26
2.	"Tomahawk"	BT & Adam K	BT and Adam K	3:59
3.	"Darko"	Gofman & Tsukerman	Gofman & Tsukerman	3:38
4.	"Space Odyssey"	Shogun	Shogun	3:59
5.	"Falling Away (Armin van Buuren remix)"	Hannah	Armin van Buuren	3:58
6.	"Fight the Fire (Stoneface and Terminal remix)"	Sue McLaren	Andy Moor featuring Sue McLaren	4:14
7.	"Liquid Logic"	Protoculture	Protoculture	3:47
8.	"Fallen Angel (Dennis Sheperd Club Mix)"	Ana Criado	Dennis Sheperd & Cold Blue featuring Ana Criado	4:17
9.	"Terrace 5 a.m. (Album Mix)"	Markus Schulz	Markus Schulz presents Dakota	6:05
10.	"Stellar"	Armin van Buuren	Gaia	3:22
11.	"Home (Daniel Kandi Retrofit Remix)"	Susana	Susana	4:06
12.	"Helion"	Mike Koglin, Genix	Mike Koglin vs. Genix	3:40
13.	"Spotlight"	Jorn van Deynhoven	Jorn van Deynhoven	3:38
14.	"Brute"	Ferry Corsten, Armin van Buuren	Ferry Corsten vs. Armin van Buuren	3:32
15.	"Universal Religion Chapter 5 (Live Continuous DJ Mix, Pt. 1)"	Various Artists	Armin van Buuren	75:36
16.	"Counting The Points"	Andrew Bayer	Andrew Bayer	5:30
17.	"The Atmosphere (Klauss Goulart's & Mark Sixma's Deep Universe Remix)"	Kid Alien	Kid Alien	3:50
18.	"Puzzle Piece (Daniel Heatcliff's Farewell Remix)"	Tania Zygar	Space RockerZ & Tania Zygar	4:08
19.	"Elegia"	Alexander Popov	Alexander Popov	3:50
20.	"Colours (Armin van Buuren Remix)"	Emma Hewitt	Emma Hewitt	3:03
21.	"Mansion"	Gareth Emery, Ashley Wallbridge	Gareth Emery & Ashley Wallbridge	4:20
22.	"Exclusive (Bigroom Edit)"	DNS Project	DNS Project	3:27
23.	"Ride The Wave (Giuseppe Ottaviani Remix)"	John O'Callaghan, Giuseppe Ottaviani	John O'Callaghan & Giuseppe Ottaviani	3:54
24.	"Gundam"	James Dymond	James Dymond	4:02
25.	"Saggitarius"	Daniel Kandi	Daniel Kandi	3:40
26.	"An Angel's Love (Vocal Mix)"	Sylvia Tosun	Alex M.O.R.P.H. featuring Sylvia Tosun	3:51
27.	"Full Moon Party"	Paul Oakenfold	Paul Oakenfold	4:39
28.	"Resource"	Re:Locate, Robert Nickson	Re:Locate vs. Robert Nickson	3:41
29.	"Viking"	Ørjan Nilsen	Ørjan Nilsen	3:17
30.	"Universal Religion Chapter 5 (Live Continuous DJ Mix, Pt. 2)"	Various Artists	Armin van Buuren	78:05

== Charts ==
Chart (2011)	Peak position
Dutch Albums (Album Top 100)	2
US Top Dance Albums (Billboard)	16
