= Connect (Ferry Corsten album) =

Studio album by Ferry Corsten
- Released: November 22, 2024
- Genres: Trance; progressive house; breakbeat
- Label: Flashover Recordings
- Producer: Ferry Corsten

Ferry Corsten chronology
Blueprint (2017)	Connect (2024)

Singles from Connect
- 1. "Connect" Released: 28 April 2023; 2. "Mind Trip" Released: 7 July 2023; 3. "Yes Man" Released: 13 October 2023; 4. "Stay Awake" Released: 1 December 2023; 5. "Fulfillment" Released: 2 February 2024; 6. "Where the Mountains Grow" Released: 29 March 2024; 7. "Belong to You" Released: 14 June 2024; 8. "Just Breathe" Released: 19 July 2024; 9. "Chaos" Released: 30 August 2024; 10. "Total Eclipse" Released: 11 October 2024; 11. "Remember" Released: 25 October 2024; 12. "Chain Reaction" Released: 8 November 2024; 13. "Back to Life" Released: 22 November 2024

Connect is a studio album by Dutch trance artist Ferry Corsten. It is his sixth studio album released under his own name. The album was released on November 22, 2024, on Corsten's own label, Flashover Recordings.

Corsten said in a statement that the album summarises the "different phases of [his] career" and his "evolution as a music producer" through multiple music genres.

The album features contributions from several vocalists, including Chris Howard, Diandra Faye and Sierra Volt, as well as AI-generated vocals. It also features contributions from multiple producers, such as Marsh, Silva City and 22Bullets.

== Release ==
Almost every song from the album was released as a single beforehand, and each single release would feature the previous singles as part of the release until almost the entire album was featured on the single. The exceptions to this were the first three singles, "Connect", "Mind Trip" and "Yes Man", which featured only the title tracks and their respective extended mixes. The only two tracks from the album not released as singles are "Happy Hour" and "Wish".

A live album showcase event took place on 19 October 2024 before the album was released on 22 November.

The singles, then the whole album, were accompanied by the extended mixes of each track featured. The 'extended mixes' edition of the album was released later on streaming services.

A deluxe edition was released on 27 June 2025, with two additional tracks, "Lose Myself", which had been released as a single a week earlier on the 20 June, and a chill mix of "Chain Reaction".

== Tracklist ==
No.	Title	Writer(s)	Producer(s)	Length
1.	"Back to Life" (with Tom Westy)	Corsten; Thomas Westerholm; Lauren Cumperpatch; Samuel Butler	Ferry Corsten; Tom Westy	2:50
2.	"Connect"	Corsten	Corsten	3:19
3.	"Where the Mountains Grow" (featuring Chris Howard)	Corsten; David Westmeijer	Corsten	3:51
4.	"Chain Reaction" (featuring MERYLL)	Corsten; Merel Ritsma; Westmeijer	Corsten	3:07
5.	"Remember" (with SUPERSTRINGS)	Corsten	Corsten; SUPERSTRINGS	3:40
6.	"Fulfillment" (with Marsh)	Corsten; Thomas Marshall	Corsten; Thomas Marshall	3:29
7.	"Stay Awake" (featuring Diandra Faye)	Corsten; Diandra Burger; Mijke Breepoel; Jack McNeilage; Mark McNeilage	Corsten	3:41
8.	"Happy Hour" (featuring Sierra Volt)	Corsten; Phoebe de Beer; Ben Schlaf	Corsten	3:20
9.	"Total Eclipse" (featuring Chris Howard)	Corsten; Westmeijer	Corsten	3:28
10.	"Yes Man"	Corsten	Corsten	3:03
11.	"Just Breathe"	Corsten	Corsten	3:25
12.	"Wish"	Corsten	Corsten	3:26
13.	"Chaos" (with Silva City)	Corsten; Alan Fitzpatrick; David Robertson	Corsten; Alan Fitzpatrick; David Robertson	3:41
14.	"Belong to You" (with 22Bullets and featuring Couche)	Henrik Høven; Jann Coucheron-Aamot; Ilja Eriksson; Karina Martha Pieroth	Corsten; 22Bullets; Jann Coucheron-Aamot	2:57
15.	"Mind Trip"	Corsten	Corsten	3:12

"Wish" samples "Cry" by System F (one of Corsten's aliases), while "Just Breathe" samples the 'Amen break' from The Winstons' "Amen Brother", which Corsten had previously used in tracks like "Legend", released under his Ferr alias.
