= Grote Prijs van Nederland =

Grote Prijs van Nederland may refer to:

- Dutch Grand Prix, an annual Formula One World Championship auto racing event
- Dutch Grand Prize, an annual series of music awards for new Dutch musicians or bands
