= Brute (composition) =

2011 composition by Ferry Corsten and Armin van Buuren

Single by Ferry Corsten vs. Armin van Buuren

from the album WKND and Universal Religion Chapter 5
- Released: 12 September 2011
- Genre: Uplifting trance
- Length: 3:18 (Radio Edit); 8:34 (Original Extended Mix); 8:59 (Armin's Illegal Drum Edit)
- Label: Flashover Recordings
- Songwriters: Ferry Corsten; Armin van Buuren
- Producers: Ferry Corsten; Armin van Buuren

Ferry Corsten singles chronology
"Check It Out" (2011)	"Brute" (2011)	"Ain't No Stoppin'" (2012)

Armin van Buuren singles chronology
"Feels So Good" (2011)	"Brute" (2011)	"Youtopia" (2011)

"Brute" is an instrumental composition by Dutch disc jockeys and producers Ferry Corsten and Armin van Buuren. It was released on 12 September 2011 in the Netherlands by Flashover Recordings as the third single from Corsten's fourth studio album, WKND. It was also included in van Buuren's compilation, Universal Religion Chapter 5.

== Release ==
"Brute" was released by Flashover Recordings on 12 September 2011; Beatport lists the release with the catalogue number FLASH076. The track was also included on A State of Trance – Future Favorite Best Of 2011, a compilation connected with the listener-voted "Future Favourite" feature on A State of Trance.

== Critical review ==
Reviews of WKND singled out "Brute" as one of the album's darker instrumental pieces. In a five-star review for DMC World Magazine, Ben Hogwood wrote that the album balanced its brighter peaks with darker tracks such as "Brute", helping to make the album a "strong, convincing whole". Rick Nijsse of EDMupdate described the collaboration with Armin van Buuren as an aggressive instrumental moment on the album, highlighting its forceful beats and delayed-rhythm feel.

Elias Menninger of Club Glow included "Brute" among the album tracks that emphasized Corsten's club-focused production, praising the album's stabs, leads and bass lines. In a 2016 retrospective for EDM Identity, Grant Gilmore from webmedia EDM Identity noticed loves the track because "it doesn’t just take the listener on a ride, but also incorporates a nice rolling bass element that drives the track forward".

== Music video ==
A music video to accompany the track was released to Armin van Buuren's YouTube channel.

== Track listing ==
Netherlands - Digital download / 12" Vinyl - Flashover(FLASH076)

1. "Brute" (Original Extended Mix) – 8:34

Netherlands - Digital download - Flashover (FLASH076-2)

1. "Brute" (Radio Edit) – 3:18

Netherlands - CD Single - Flashover

1. "Brute" (Radio Edit) - 3:21
2. "Brute" (Original Extended Mix) - 8:34

Netherlands - Armin's Illegal Drum Edit - Digital download - Flashover (FLASH097)

1. "Brute" (Armin's Illegal Drum Edit) - 8:59

Netherlands - Digital download - Flashover

1. "Brute" – 3:33
2. "Brute" (Original Extended Mix) – 8:34
3. "Brute" (Armin's Illegal Drum Edit) – 9:00

== Charts ==
Chart (2011)	Peak position
Russia (Tophit)	251
