= RFM Somnii =

- Genre: EDM and much more!
- Locations: Figueira da Foz, Portugal
- Years active: 2012–present
- Website: rfmsomnii.com/en/

RFM SOMNII is a music festival held annually at Praia do Relógio in Figueira da Foz, Portugal, and is organized by RFM, a radio station. RFM SOMNII has almost a decade of stories and more than 600,000 visitors who already visited the biggest sunset ever, at one of the most beautiful beaches of the Portuguese coast, with access to the beach and to the sea.

The 2021 edition, which will feature 3 days of emotions and surprises, will highlight a very important element of nature's balance: water.

Inspired by this element, the festival features artists from around the world and 72 hours of music and entertainment.

The largest sunset concept ever appeared in 2012 and has been held since the second edition in Praia do Relógio, at Figueira da Foz - Portugal.

== 2012 ==
7 July	Erick Morillo; Pete tha Zouk; Pedro Tabuada; Rich & Saraiva; DJ António Mendes

== 2013 ==
13 July	Sebastian Ingrosso; Sharam; Dyro; Otto Knows; KURA; Mendes & Rich

== 2014 ==
11 July	DVBBS; Cedric Gervais; Sick Individuals; Thomas Newson
12 July	Alesso; W&W; Alvaro; Joey Dale; Pete tha Zouk

== 2015 ==
11 July	Nicky Romero; The Chainsmokers; Dannic; KURA; MOTi; Julian Calor; dfee; Mendes
12 July	Martin Solveig; Robin Schulz; MAKJ; DubVision; Michael Calfan; Rich; André Henriques

== 2016 ==
8 July	DJ Snake; Don Diablo; R3hab; Sam Feldt; Malaa; Tom Enzy; Mendes; Ewave
9 July	Hardwell; Borgore; Diego Miranda; Firebeatz; Lucas & Steve; WAO; Mendes & Rich; André Henriques; Menasso
10 July	Oliver Heldens; KSHMR; Galantis; Tujamo; Joe Stone; Massivedrum; Rich; David Souza

== 2017 ==
7 July	Armin Van Buuren; Breathe Carolina; Sunnery James & Ryan Marciano; Merk & Kremont; 3lau; Marnik
8 July	Blasterjaxx; Laidback Luke; Timmy Trumpet; Brennan Heart; Florian Picasso; San Holo
9 July	Tiësto; KURA; NERVO; Kungs; Tungevaag & Raaban; Mike Williams

== 2018 ==
6 July	Yellow Claw; Quintino; Angerfist; GTA; Tom Staar; Curbi
7 July	Axwell Λ Ingrosso; Chocolate Puma; Ummet Ozcan; Moksi; Gregor Salto; Slushii
8 July	Steve Angello; Alan Walker; Cesqeaux; Corey James; Brooks

== 2019 ==
5 Julho	Alesso; Afrojack; Radical Redemption; Vigel; Fedde Le Grand; Olga Ryazanova; Rich & Mendes
6 Julho	Dj Snake; Jay Hardway; Netsky´; Redfoo; Ozuna; Magnificence; Rich & Mendes
7 Julho	Don Diablo; Tyga; Jonas Blue; LVNDSCAPE; LOST KINGS; JAMES HYPE; THIRD ≡ PARTY; Rich & Mendes
