= L.E.F. =

Studio album by Ferry Corsten
- Released: 26 May 2006
- Genres: Trance, house, electro, dance
- Length: 97:02
- Labels: Flashover Recordings; Ultra Records
- Producer: Ferry Corsten

Ferry Corsten chronology
Right of Way (2003)	L.E.F. (2006)	Twice in a Blue Moon (2008)

Singles from L.E.F.
- 1. "Fire" Released: 28 October 2005; 2. "Watch Out" Released: 22 May 2006; 3. "Junk" Released: 18 September 2006; 4. "Beautiful" Released: 26 March 2007; 5. "Forever" Released: 2 April 2007; 6. "Into The Dark" Released: 21 January 2008

Professional ratings
Review scores
Source	Rating
Gigwise	3/5 stars
MusicOMH	3/5 stars
Trance.nu	(Favourable)

L.E.F. (short for Loud, Electronic, Ferocious) is a dance and electro album released by Ferry Corsten in May 2006. It was his second studio album that was released under his own name. The word lef also means "guts" (as in: having guts) in Dutch. The album has spawned six singles. The songs include vocals by Simon Le Bon, Howard Jones, Denise Rivera, Debra Andrew, Guru, and Oz.

== Track listing ==
No.	Title	Lyrics	Length
1.	"Intro"		0:59
2.	"Are You Ready"		5:42
3.	"Fire"	Simon Le Bon	7:20
4.	"L.E.F."		3:24
5.	"Into the Dark"	Howard Jones	5:43
6.	"Galaxia"		7:31
7.	"Beautiful"	Debra Andrew	7:59
8.	"Possession"	Denise Rivera	5:49
9.	"On My Mind"	Denise Rivera	4:47
10.	"Down on Love"	Oz	4:56
11.	"Forever"	Debra Andrew	3:21
12.	"Watch Out"		6:18
13.	"Junk"	Guru	2:37
14.	"Cubikated"		4:59
15.	"Freefalling"	Denise Rivera	5:28
16.	"Daylight"		4:33

Bonus tracks (differing by region)

- Daylight
- I Love You
- System F - Insolation (Ferry Corsten's Flashover Remix)
- Prison Break Theme (Ferry Corsten's Breakout Remix)
- "Fire", released in 2005, was the lead track, originally built on the sampled vocals of Duran Duran singer Simon Le Bon from their 1991 hit, "Serious", but later re-recorded by Le Bon.
- "L.E.F." is a track that was used for Dance Dance Revolution SuperNova.
- Vocals for the track "Watch Out" were done by Ferry Corsten himself.

== Bonus tracks ==
There are four releases of L.E.F., the only difference between each version is the last bonus track.

- The European version has I Love You.
- The North American version has Prison Break theme (Ferry Corsten Breakout Mix).
- The Asian version has System F - Insolation (Ferry Corsten Flashover Mix), plus a bonus DVD with:
1. Fire (videoclip)
2. Rock Your Body, Rock (videoclip)
3. L.E.F @ Avalon (L.A.) 04/03/2006 (videoclip)
4. Interview with Simon Le Bon
5. Single interview
- The version for other regions features Daylight as the bonus track.

== Charts ==
Chart (2006)	Peak position
Dutch Albums (Album Top 100)	58
