= Shelley Harland =

English singer-songwriter

- Also known as: Shelley Ann Harland-Wright
- Born: Shelley Ann Harland
- Origin: New York, New York, United States
- Genres: Pop; electronica; folk rock; trip hop
- Occupations: Singer-songwriter, producer
- Instruments: Vocals, guitar
- Years active: 2000–present

Shelley Ann Harland-Wright (born as Shelley Ann Harland, Caterham, Surrey) is an English singer-songwriter and producer. She started her music career in New York and performed mononymously as Harland. She then moved to Australia and released material as Shelley Harland.

== Biography ==
Shelley Ann Harland was born in Caterham, Surrey UK. While growing up, she did not receive any musical training; however, she developed a love and a taste for music and would make up songs with a keyboard she had at home. Harland finished her secondary education and started working as a beauty therapist. Around that time she met an Australian guitarist-singer-songwriter, James Wright, and they developed a domestic partnership. The couple moved to New York where initially Harland worked as a private investigator while Wright performed in his band, Stretch Princess. She later recalled "[James] was on tour and one day I just picked up his guitar and just started playing it ... It was an immediate and natural thing. I started to play and now I can't imagine not doing it. It's like breathing – music – it's who I am. It was fate".

Harland started to write songs with an acoustic guitar and a four-track record sampler. She collaborated with Andrew Wright, James' brother, a programmer and producer. They created a project called Phoelar. Its music style was orientated towards electronic and trip-hop sounds. Justin Elswick of Review Digest found that Phoelar was "more experimental and somewhat darker" than Harland's later work. He noted that "'Lovers Greed' is a fantastic track that captures the creamy and urban vibe of a Quarterflash or The Motels song". All the tracks were co-written by Harland and Andrew.

Shortly after Harland released her first two albums Sinking Shade and Salt Box Lane under the mononym Harland but after that used her full name.

By 2006, Shelley and James Wright had moved to Sydney. She released her fourth album, Red Leaf, in 2009. It featured predominantly acoustic and pop sounds, in contrast with her previous electronic works. Four singles were lifted from it: "Wonder", "Friday", "Stranger" and "In the Dark". Harland recorded her fifth album, The Girl Who Cried Wolf, after launching a fundraising campaign. The song "New Things" was released as a single.

In 2013, her song "In the Dark" (from the Red Leaf album) was chosen for the advertising campaign for the new Omega Ladymatic Watch, featuring actress Nicole Kidman. Harland also performed at the launch event La nuit enchantée, which took place at the Stadpalais Liechtenstein in Vienna.

Since the start of her career, Harland has collaborated with many artists from the world of electronic music, such as Delerium, Ferry Corsten, Pole Folder, Loverush UK!, Sleepthief, Headstrong, Morgan Page, Junkie XL and Guru/Jazzmatazz. She toured with Delerium, The Fray and Elvis Costello.

== Discography ==
Album	Year
Phoelar	1999
Salt Box Lane	2003
Sinking Shade	2005
Red Leaf	2009
The Girl Who Cried Wolf	2014

== Collaborations ==
Collaborations released as singles
Year	Artist	Title	Label
2003	Delerium	"Above the Clouds"	Nettwerk
2004	Rio Klein	"Fearless"	Nettwerk
2007	Loverush UK!	"Different World"	Loverush Digital
2007	Mike Hiratzka	"Only Human"	Impropa Talents
2008	J-Punch	"The Secret"	Sundown Recordings
2008	Pole Folder	"Radio 101"	Proton Music
2008	Pole Folder	"Love Chemical"	Faith music
2008	Headstrong	"Helpless"	Solar Records

Collaborations not released as singles
Year	Artist	Title(s)	Medium	Label
2003	Junkie XL	"Rivers"	Radio JXL: A Broadcast from the Computer Hell Cabin	Roadrunner Records
2003	Ferry Corsten	"Holding On"	Right of Way	Tsunami Records
2005	Pole Folder	"Abrasion"; "Fall in Violet"	Zero Gold	Bedrock Records
2006	Sleepthief	"Desire of Ages"	The Dawnseeker	Neurodisc Records
2007	Guru	"Follow the Signs"	Guru's Jazzmatazz, Vol. 4: The Hip Hop Jazz Messenger: Back to the Future	7 Grand
2012	Morgan Page	"Loves Mistaken"	In the Air	Nettwerk
2018	Sleepthief	"Bruised by a Breath"	Mortal Longing	Neurodisc Records
