= Vincent de Moor =

Musical artist (born 1973)

- Also known as: VDM; Blizz; DH Cartel; Emerald; Extract; Fix To Fax; Flashbang; Gmoork; M. Theatre; Outline; Phocus; Raster; Sidewalk; V-Lock
- Born: 1973 (age 52–53); Delft, Netherlands
- Genre: Trance
- Years active: 1993–2008
- Formerly of: Veracocha

Vincent de Moor (Dutch pronunciation: [ˈvɪnsɛn də ˈmoːr]; born 1973) is a former Dutch trance artist. He is most notable for his work with the record producer Ferry Corsten under the working title, "Veracocha," and for his 2001 single, "Fly Away".

== Musical career ==
=== Early career ===
De Moor first recorded in 1993 as Fix To Fax. Tracks released under this alias included "Enjoy Yourself", "Do U Feel It", "Pick It Up" and "Take Control". Other early releases include "Het Vliegende Kunstgebit" as Gmoork, "Chinese Juice" and "Exotic Mind" as Outline, and "Voice In The Dark", "Frame Of Pleasure" and "Brazilia Carnavelas" as Sidewalk.

His breakthrough track, using his own name, was "Flowtation". The track was first released in 1996, and reached #54 in the UK Singles Chart in August 1997. Several versions of this track are available, including a 2002 remix with vocals. In 1998, De Moor collaborated with Ernst Bijlsma to release "Don't Hurt Me" (as Cache) and, using his own name, released the track "Orion City" and a debut album of the same name. He also found time to release tracks including "Darwin's Voyage", "Magnetic" and "Domino Runner" using his VdM moniker.

=== Later career ===
"Carte Blanche" by Veracocha, a collaboration between de Moor and Ferry Corsten, reached #22 in the UK chart. Ferry Corsten reportedly chose the name Veracocha after watching a TV program about the Incas. A further apparent favourite of Corsten's from this period is De Moor's remix of 2HD's "Sunflakes". The track featured on De Moor's second album Moor (2000), along with the singles "Shamu", "Between 2 Fires" and "Eternity (Forever)". 2000 also saw the first release of "Fly Away", which went on to become De Moor's most successful single when it reached #30 in the UK in 2001. Some issues of this track were released under the pseudonym Emerald.

In 2003, de Moor released the tracks "Crystal Clouds" and "Nexus Asia". The following year, he released "Desdemonia" as Raster and "Grooveslide" and "Energy Reflect" as Flashbang. He is also known for his remixes, most notably of Tenth Planet's "Ghosts", De Bos's "On The Run", Armin van Buuren's "Communication" and Ayumi Hamasaki's "Fly High".

In 2007, de Moor reworked two of his well-known tracks, "Flowtation" and "No Hesitation". His 2001 hit single, "Fly Away" was also re-released with new remixes by Sean Tyas and Cosmic Gate. He also reworked, "Sunflower" (a single originally from his Moor album) in 2008. This was his last official release.

== Personal life ==
De Moor is a private person and little is known about his personal life and career. As of today, no interview with him exists.

In July 2014, record label Cloud 9 Dance advised TranceFixxed: "I checked with Vincent and he’s not interested in doing any interviews. He’s no longer active in the music industry, but he enjoys the fact that people are still into his music though!"

== See also ==
- Geert Huinink
