= Liquid Child =

German musical duo

Liquid Child were a German dance music production duo, comprising Tobias Menguser and Jürgen Herbath. They had chart success in 1999, when they reached #25 in the UK Singles Chart with "Diving Faces". Their next single release was "Return of Atlantis" (1999) which was remixed by Ferry Corsten.

== Discography ==
=== Albums ===
- Non Stop Liquid (2000)
- 25th Floor (2007)

=== Singles ===
- "Diving Faces" (1998)
- "Return of Atlantis" (1999)
- "Magic Crystals" (2001)
