= Watch Out (Ferry Corsten song) =

Single by Ferry Corsten

from the album L.E.F.
- B-side: "Remix"
- Released: 22 May 2006
- Genre: Trance
- Length: 6:18
- Label: Ultra
- Songwriter(s): Ferry Corsten
- Producer(s): Ferry Corsten

Ferry Corsten singles chronology
"Junk" (2006)	"Watch Out" (2006)	"Whatever" (2006)

"Watch Out" by Ferry Corsten is a trance song that was released as a single in 2006, as well as appearing on Ferry Corsten's 2006 album L.E.F.

== Chart performance ==
Chart (2006)	Peak position
Finland (Suomen virallinen lista)	14
Netherlands (Single Top 100)	64
Scotland (OCC)	34
UK Dance (OCC)	11
UK Singles (OCC)	57
