= TranceFixxed =

TranceFixxed.co.uk
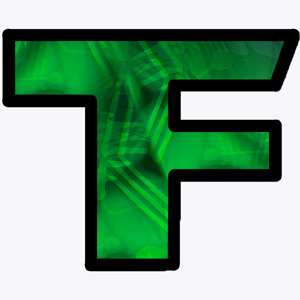
- Website type: Online music magazine and website
- Available in: English
- Owner: Nonprofit organization
- Creator: Tim Turner
- Website: www.trancefixxed.co.uk
- Registration: Free, optional
- Launched: December 2012
- Current status: Active

TranceFixxed.co.uk is an independent United Kingdom based Trance and Progressive oriented music site including news, interviews, music reviews and free legal music downloads.

The site is notable for its 'Trance Fixxed Meets...' interview series, which has included interviews with international singers, vocalists, music producers and DJs.

== History ==
The domain was bought in 2011 by Tim Turner and initially used as a private blog. In November 2012 the blog was taken offline and in December 2012 the music website was launched.

== Interviews ==
The first interview published in the 'Trance Fixxed Meets...' series was with Kirsty Hawkshaw in May 2013. 2 further interviews were published in 2013, with vocalist Marcie Joy and Russian Progressive DJ and producer Alex Devyatyarov (a.k.a. Santerna).

In 2014, interviews were published more frequently, with artists such as Menno de Jong, Christina Novelli, Standerwick, Mark Sherry and Super8 & Tab.

== Site Design ==
The website is self hosted Wordpress site and was launched with the BlogoLife theme and a blue colour scheme. in late summer 2013, the website design was updated to the current Parabola theme and the black colour scheme.

The TranceFixxed green logo was introduced with the Parabola theme in summer 2013.
