= Pole Folder =

Belgian electronic musician

Benoît Franquet, better known as Pole Folder, is a Belgian electronic musician and live club performer, based in Brussels.

A former protégée of British DJ John Digweed, Pole Folder entered the limelight in 2001 as a DJ and producer at the forefront of the European progressive house movement, and has since evolved into a multi-instrumentalist and live performer of melodic-driven techno, tech house and deep house.

Pole Folder rose to prominence when his track "Apollo Vibes" was featured on John Digweed's Los Angeles retrospective in the Global Underground series on Boxed Records. This was followed over the course of the following year by the AA single Enter the Rhythm/Waxxx and a third single, "Dust" (which was again championed by Digweed).

From there, EPs and single projects followed on such labels as Sunkissed Records and Mo-Do Records, whilst Pole Folder spent much of the next two years focusing on an artist album he had been commissioned to do by John Digweed, making him the first artist to produce an artist album for Bedrock Records. The album, Zero Gold, featured collaborations with Brooklyn singer and songwriter Shelley Harland, fellow Belgian Sandra Ferretti and Kirsty Hawkshaw. Several Zero Gold tracks such as "Faith on Me" and "Salvation on Slavery Sins" were featured on hit US TV shows, including Nip/Tuck and CSI: Crime Scene Investigation. Pole Folder and CP's "Apollo Vibes" cut was featured in the movie Stark Raving Mad.

In 2006, Pole Folder produced a series of projects and EPs for Mashtronic Records and Proton Music. Pole Folder has also performed as a DJ and live artist internationally. He also ran a digital record label called Reworck since 2010. The label is supported by the likes of John Digweed, Hernán Cattáneo, and Laurent Garnier.
