= Fire (Ferry Corsten song) =

Single by Ferry Corsten

from the album L.E.F.
- Released: 2005
- Genre: Trance
- Length: 7:20
- Songwriters: Nicholas Bates, Sterling Campbell, Ferry Corsten, Warren Cuccurullo, Simon Le Bon, John Taylor

Ferry Corsten singles chronology
"The Midnight Sun" (2005)	"Fire" (2005)	"Junk" (2006)

"Fire" by Ferry Corsten is a trance song that was released as a single in 2005, as well as appearing on Ferry Corsten's 2006 album L.E.F. It features vocals by Simon Le Bon (of the popular 80's band Duran Duran) from the 1990 song "Serious" by Duran Duran, which were re-recorded by Le Bon rather than sampled from the original song. A compilation of eight different remixes, also called "Fire", was released in 2006. The song received wide play throughout Europe through 2006 on commercial radio stations.

== Music video ==
The music video features a woman in a block of ice being defrosted by Ferry Corsten using a Gas axe. The video also features extracts from Duran Duran's video for the song "Serious". The extracts feature LeBon close up performing the lyrics that form the main body of "Fire".

== Charts ==
=== Weekly charts ===
Chart (2005–2006)	Peak position
Australia (ARIA Charts)	61
Belgium (Ultratip Bubbling Under Flanders)	12
Germany (GfK)	89
Ireland (IRMA)	21
Netherlands (Dutch Top 40)	18
Netherlands (Single Top 100)	24
Scotland Singles (OCC)	29
UK Dance (OCC)	9
UK Singles (OCC)	40
US Dance/Mix Show Airplay (Billboard)	6

=== Year-end charts ===
Chart (2006)	Position
US Dance/Mix Show Airplay (Billboard)	24
