= Right of Way (album) =

Studio album by Ferry Corsten
- Released: 25 October 2003
- Genres: Trance, electro
- Length: 77:45
- Label: Tsunami / Moonshine
- Producer: Ferry Corsten

Ferry Corsten chronology
Together (2003)	Right of Way (2003)	L.E.F. (2006)

Professional ratings
Review scores
Source	Rating
Allmusic	3/5 stars
BBC	(Favourable)
MusicOMH	(Favourable)
The Music Fix	(8/10)
Resident Advisor	4/5 stars

Right of Way is a trance album by DJ Ferry Corsten. It was the first album to be released under his own name. The album spawned four singles: "Punk" (UK #29), "Rock Your Body, Rock" (UK #11), "It's Time" (UK #51) and "Right of Way" (UK #76)

== Track listing ==
1. "Sublime" – 7:46
2. "Whatever!" – 4:47
3. "Rock Your Body, Rock" – 5:15
4. "Right of Way" – 7:46
5. "Kyoto" – 6:10
6. "Holding On (feat. Shelley Harland)" – 3:47
7. "Sweet Sorrow" – 6:15
8. "Hearts Connected" – 6:37
9. "Punk" – 4:45
10. "It's Time" – 5:22
11. "Show Your Style (feat. Birgit)" – 3:10
12. "Star Traveller" – 6:13
13. "Skindeep" – 3:44
14. "In My Dreams" – 6:03
- Track 2, "Whatever!", contains a beat slightly similar to the "Whatever" song by Ayumi Hamasaki. Not to be confused with the actual remix of Ayumi's version done by Ferry Corsten.

== Charts ==
Chart (2003–2004)	Peak position
Dutch Albums (Album Top 100)	66
US Top Dance Albums (Billboard)	21
