= Together (Ferry Corsten album) =

Studio album by System F
- Released: January 29, 2003
- Genre: Trance
- Length: 57:58
- Label: Avex Trax
- Producer: System F

Ferry Corsten chronology
Out of the Blue (2001)	Together (2003)	Right of Way (2003)

Singles from Together
- 1. "Dance Valley Theme 2001" Released: 7 August 2001; 2. "Ligaya" Released: 22 November 2002 (as Gouryella); 3. "Together" Released: 18 March 2003 (Japan); 4. "Spread Your Wings" Released: 30 May 2003 (Japan); 5. "Spaceman" Released: 2003; 6. "Ignition, Sequence, Start!" Released: 22 November 2004; 7. "Reaching Your Soul / Pegasus" Released: 13 April 2005

Together is a 2003 album by trance musician Ferry Corsten, released under his alias System F.

== Track listing ==
1. Together (3:23)
2. The Sonnet (3:59)
3. Ligaya (as Gouryella) (3:28)
4. Ignition, Sequence, Start! (3:31)
5. Dance Valley Theme 2001 (3:43)
6. Deja Vu (3:55)
7. Spaceman (2:21)
8. Savannah (3:45)
9. Pegasus (3:19)
10. Reaching Your Soul (4:36)
11. Devotion (4:21)
12. Underwater (4:07)
13. Solarize (4:51)
14. Q-Rious (3:45)
15. Spread Your Wings (3:54)
