= Kura (music producer) =

Portuguese DJ and producer

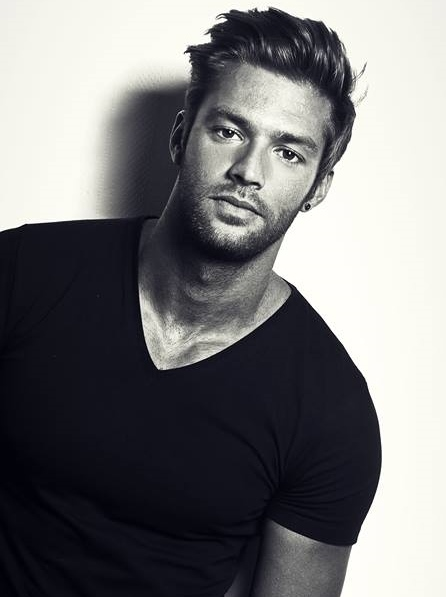
- KURA in January 2013

Background information
- Born: Rúben de Almeida Barbeiro; 21 August 1987 (age 39); Leiria, Centro Region, Portugal
- Genres: Electro house; big room house; jungle terror
- Occupations: Disc jockey; producer
- Years active: 2005–present
- Labels: Flashover; Revealed; Spinnin'; Musical Freedom; Dharma; Smash the House
- Website: www.djkura.com

Rúben de Almeida Barbeiro (born August 21, 1987 in Leiria), better known by his stage name Kura (stylized in all caps), is a Portuguese electro house DJ and record producer. Kura has released tracks through labels such as Hardwell's Revealed Recordings, Flashover Recordings, Musical Freedom, and Spinnin' Records, among others.

== Career ==
In the early 2000s, he started following the club scene and by 2005 Kura would play on a DJ booth while working at a skate shop near Lisbon and eventually gigs in Cascais's club Coconuts. His first DJ residency came along and he became Bahaus resident DJ for 3 years. His first bootleg was a hit among his peers – Sidney Samson's "Work It" on Hardwell's remix crossed with Bob Marley followed by his first original track, "Russian Guitar" that was picked up by the Portuguese label, Kaos Records. He was invited to play as a resident DJ at Lisbon’s Kapital, and then at the summer club, Tamariz, and then to Gossip, a major club in Lisbon. He also focused on a freelance career, and more invitations to play in bigger venues.

His international breakthrough came with his track "Brazil". Roger Sanchez picked it up for his "Release Yourself Radioshow". Thomas Gold picked Kura's hits "Polaris", "Love Will Find You", a remix of "Nightrain" for his radioshow. Besides these Kura also got support for his tracks from Hardwell, Nicky Romero and EDX, amongst many others. In 2012, he was invited to join the Swiss-based agency WDB Management. He also collaborated with American DJ/producer MAKJ in "Galaxy" and "Old Memories".

== Discography ==
- 2009: Kura - Russian Guitar (Kaos Records)
- 2009: Kura - Take Me Now (Kaos Records)
- 2009: Kura and Brito - Delicious (Kaos Records)
- 2010: Kura and Phil G - Follow Your Dreams (Exklusive Records)
- 2011: Kura - We Keep Moovin [FREE DOWNLOAD]
- 2011: Kura - Brazil (4Kenzo Recordings)
- 2011: Kura - Ammonia (Revealed Recordings)
- 2011: Kura featuring The Silva and Sinead - Night & Day (4Kenzo Recordings)
- 2011: Kura - Dirty Dutch (Cool Beat Records)
- 2011: Kura - Here We Go Again (Cool Beat Records)
- 2011: Kura - Drop The Beat (Loop 128 Recordings)
- 2012: Kura - Love Will Find You (Cr2 Recordings)
- 2012: Kura - Default (Cr2 Recordings)
- 2012: Kura vs. Makj - Galaxy (Juicy Music)
- 2012: Kura vs. Makj - Old Memories (Juicy Music)
- 2012: Kura - Asteroids On Acid (Tiger Records)
- 2013: Kura - Odyssey (Tiger Records)
- 2013: Kura and Jake Shanahan - Compound (Flashover Recordings)
- 2013: Kura - Venom (Tiger Records)
- 2013: Kura - Devious Behavior (Flashover Recordings)
- 2013: Kura - Roll The Drum (Flashover Recordings)
- 2013: Kura - Bumbershoot (Flashover Recordings)
- 2013: Kura - Jengo [FREE DOWNLOAD]
- 2014: Kura - Sabotage (Trice Recordings/Armada Music)
- 2014: Kura and Halfway House - Blackmail (Flashover Recordings)
- 2014: KURA and John Christian - Kratos (Flashover Recordings)
- 2014: Kura - Makhor (Revealed Recordings)
- 2015: Kura - Blow Out (Oxygen/Spinnin' Records)
- 2015: Sidney Samson and KURA - Kamikaze [FREE DOWNLOAD]
- 2015: Kura featuring Sarah Mount - Collide (Oxygen/Spinnin' Records)
- 2015: Kura - Namek (Oxygen/Spinnin' Records)
- 2015: Kura and Tony Junior - King Kong (Wall Recordings/Spinnin' Records)
- 2015: Kura - Kubano (Doorn/Spinnin' Records)
- 2016: Hardwell and Kura - Calavera (Revealed Recordings)
- 2016: Kura - Bounce (Revealed Recordings)
- 2016: Tony Junior and Kura featuring Jimmy Clash - Walk Away (Musical Freedom/Spinnin' Records)
- 2016: Kura - Graveyard (Graveyard EP) (Spinnin' Premium/Spinnin' Records)
- 2016: Kura - Detective (Graveyard EP) (Spinnin' Premium/Spinnin' Records)
- 2016: Laidback Luke and Kura - Mad Man (Spinnin' Records)
- 2016: Kura - Tora (Spinnin' Records)
- 2017: Kura - Loki (Revealed Recordings)
- 2017: Kura featuring Melody Noel - Paper Roses (Spinnin' Records)
- 2017: Kura - Bangalore (Revealed Recordings)
- 2017: Kura and Syzz - Calcutta (Revealed Recordings)
- 2017: Hardwell and KURA x Anthony B - Police (You Ain't Ready) [Hardwell and Friends EP Vol.1] (Revealed Recordings)
- 2017: Kura - Sedated (Spinnin' Premium/Spinnin' Records)
- 2017: Kura and ANGEMI featuring Luciana - On Your Side (Smash The House)
- 2017: Kura - Skank (Revealed Recordings)
- 2018: Kura and Olly James - Fuego (Revealed Recordings)
- 2018: Kura and Jimmy Clash - Young & Invincible (Revealed Recordings)
- 2018: Kura - Lambo (Musical Freedom/Spinnin' Records)
- 2018: Kura & MR.BLACK feat. MC K9 – Favela (Spinnin' Records)
- 2019: KURA - Nothing Else Matters (Spinnin' Records)
- 2019: KURA & Jimmy Clash - MY Crew (Spinnin' Records)
- 2019: KURA - Beast Mode (Spinnin' Records)
- 2019: KURA - Thunder [FREE DOWNLOAD]
- 2019: KURA & Syzz - Lightspeed (Lyghtspeed EP) (Spinnin' Premium/Spinnin' Records)
- 2019: KURA & HIDDN - New School (Lyghtspeed EP) (Spinnin' Premium/Spinnin' Records)
- 2019: KURA & Alvita - Jinx (Lyghtspeed EP) (Spinnin' Premium/Spinnin' Records)
- 2019: KURA & Trobi - Burn (Lyghtspeed EP) (Spinnin' Premium/Spinnin' Records)
- 2019: KURA & 22 Bullets - My Love (Dharma Worldwide)
- 2020: KURA - Gunz In My House (Spinnin' Records)
