= Veracocha =

Dutch trance music collaboration

- Origin: Netherlands
- Genre: Trance
- Years active: 1998–1999
- Label: Positiva Records
- Past members: Vincent de Moor; Ferry Corsten

Veracocha was the alias used for the trance music collaboration between Dutch producers Vincent de Moor and Ferry Corsten, both of whom have had solo success under their own names, and using various other pseudonyms.

The only track issued under the Veracocha alias was "Carte Blanche", which was released on the Deal Records label in Netherlands then on the Positiva label in the UK in 1999, and reached number 22 in the UK Singles Chart. The song has since been remixed and re-released on many occasions. A track entitled "Drafting" was on the B-Side of the original release.

Veracocha also remixed "Ayla" by Ayla (the German DJ and producer Ingo Kunzi).

In 2008, the track was re-released with new mixes by Cosmic Gate and Manuel De La Mare. In 2023, the track was re-released as 'Dirty South & Ferry Corsten - Carte Blanche'.
