= Dutch Grand Prize =

Dutch music awards

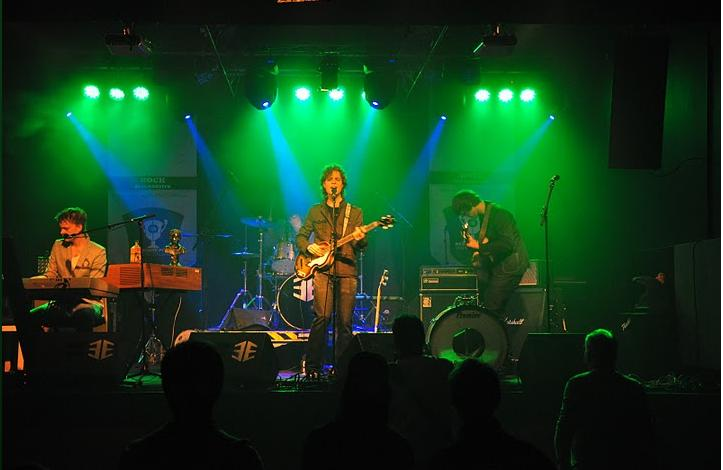
Indie folk band AlascA performing at the 2011 finals

The Grote Prijs van Nederland (Dutch for "Grand Prize of the Netherlands") is a series of music awards handed out yearly since 1983 to recognize talented new Dutch musicians, both solo artists and bands. It is the largest and longest-running pop music competition in the Netherlands. Previous winners include producer Junkie XL, rock band Green Lizard, rapper Brainpower, pop group Volumia! and singer-songwriter Signe Tollefsen.
