= Gouryella =

Music project

- Origin: Netherlands
- Genres: Trance
- Years active: 1998–2002; 2015–present
- Labels: Tsunami; Flashover Recordings
- Members: Ferry Corsten
- Past members: Tiësto
- Website: ferrycorsten.com

Gouryella is a solo trance project of Dutch musician Ferry Corsten. Gouryella was originally a Dutch production duo, comprising Corsten and Tiësto, who later left in 2001. The name Gouryella originates from the Warlpiri language, and is translated as "heaven" or "paradise".

In 2015, his track "Anahera" was chosen as "Tune of the Year" on Armin van Buuren's show A State of Trance.

== History ==
=== 1998–2003 ===
In 1998, Dutch musicians Ferry Corsten and Tiësto collaborated to create Gouryella. In time there were twenty separate album releases of the first four Gouryella tracks from nine different record labels. One of those albums was In Search of Sunrise. As of 2024, Gouryella has produced eleven original tracks: "Gouryella", "Gorella", "Walhalla", "In Walhalla", "Tenshi", "Ligaya", "Anahera", "Neba", "Venera (Vee's Theme)", "Surga" and "Orenda" . "Gorella" and "In Walhalla" were B-sides and were not released in the UK, although they did appear on the respective German and Dutch import albums.

The first single, "Gouryella", was released in May 1999 and became a huge hit scoring various chart positions around the world, including a top fifteen position in the UK Singles Chart. A remix vinyl, containing remixes by Armin van Buuren and Colin Tevendale and Stuart Crichton under their Gigolo alias, was released later. After the success of "Gouryella", Corsten and Tiësto hit the studio together again and came up with their more commercially orientated follow-up single, entitled "Walhalla". The single, which also included a remix from Armin, as well as Hybrid, was released in September. Complemented with vocals by Rachel Spier, "Walhalla" became again an international success and solidified Gouryella's status as a production duo. This reputation was backed up when both singles were certified Gold on record sales. On October 24, 1999, Corsten and Tiësto were profiled on an episode of the Dutch TV show Lola da Musica, documenting their gigs in Ibiza and Glasgow, and the making of "Walhalla".

Also in 1999, Gouryella remixed two tracks for other artists: Binary Finary – "1999" and Solange – "Messages". Additionally, Ferry Corsten and Tiësto released two tracks under the name of Vimana. "We Came" appeared on Tiësto's Black Hole Recordings and featured a B-side "Dreamtime". The release of "Tenshi" (Japanese for "angel") in 2000 featured some remixes from Transa, ATB and Ratty (Scooter). The single has been included in video games such as FIFA Football 2002 and Dance Dance Revolution X2.

In late 2001, there were rumours in the forums of Trance.nu that Gouryella had suffered a split when Tiësto left the act. To get the rumours confirmed, the site's staff sent a message to Black Hole Recordings, to which Arny Bink, the co-founder of the label, replied and said: "I can confirm that Gouryella have split up, and although there will be new Gouryella tracks, Tiësto will no longer produce them. This is for artistical reasons only [. . .] Ferry and Tiësto are still good friends." Many took the rumours about a possible Gouryella split as being the result of an article about DJ Tiësto's album In My Memory which appeared in Mixmag's November 2001 issue, in which Tiësto stepped on Ferry Corsten's feet by saying "It's great to show the world I'm not just another Ferry Corsten". But according to Purple Eye Entertainment's Brian Dessaur, it was not at all the background to the split of Gouryella. "Due to the very busy schedule's [sic] of Ferry and Tijs, they aren't able to get together in the studio at the moment. This does not mean that there will never be a new Gouryella single in the near future," he said. On December 27, 2001, Bink contacted the site and handed over a statement from Tiësto, which read:

I regret the fact that Ferry and I don't have the time to make a new Gouryella. If you want to produce a good track you need to have time and at this moment we are both to busy [sic] to sit down together. The Purple Eye Record Company is pressuring for a new Gouryella single but I think you can't rush things. You can't just make a new Gouryella single in a day. I am very busy with my own schedule, producing, remixing and touring around the world. So is Ferry. I have great respect for Ferry and think he is one of the best producers of electronic dance music in the world. He brought trance to a new level.

This takes me to the second issue, the review in Mixmag. I never said the i am not just a new Ferry Corsten, my exact words were: I have always been in the shadow of Ferry Corsten with my productions, that's why i am proud on my "in my memory" album [sic] because i did that by myself. The press always rewrites your words and they are always looking for a new sensation. So, we split up, but mainly because Purple Eye wanted a new Gouryella single RIGHT NOW. This doesn't say we won't make a new Gouryella together in the future, we are still good friends and I have great respect for Ferry Corsten.

Just a few minutes after this statement was handed to Trance.nu, another message was sent to the site, this time from Dessaur, who announced that there would be a new single in the spring of 2002 on Purple Eye. Despite his statement, and his desire to produce an album together with Corsten, Tiësto did not rejoin the act and left Corsten by himself to write and produce Gouryella's next singles.

Following the departure of Tiësto, Corsten would collaborate with Dutch composer John Ewbank to produce the fourth Gouryella single. In the beginning of 2002, they started to work on the track. Titled "Ligaya" (Tagalog for "happiness"), it was released with a remix pack from Hiver & Hammer and Green Court, plus an extra Ferry Corsten Remix. Dutch duo Rank 1 also did a remix which, although not officially released, did see Rank 1 play it in some of their sets in 2002 and 2003. A stream of remixes by fans soon followed the original release, most notably by Airbase who allowed people to download his own remix for free before the original was released to the public. 2003 saw the release of "Ligaya"'s hard mixes by Yoji Biomehanika and Walt. Resident Advisor reviewed "Ligaya" and gave it a score of 4.5 out of 5, saying: "Regardless this track is big, the percussion is used to perfection in the break giving the track enough emotion to compete the best of them, similar in style to William Orbit's Barber's Adagio for Strings which also received massive recognition with a Ferry Corsten mix. Truly an example of what kind of emotion can be used within dance music Ligaya must be heard to be believed, another massive release from Gouryella. Brilliant!."

=== 2012–present ===
It took several years for Gouryella to resurface as news. Rumours circulated the internet that Gouryella was due to release a track called "Maya" in 2012; however, a status update on Facebook posted on November 7, 2011, by Ferry Corsten suggested that this rumour was in fact untrue. Ferry commented, "I've read some rumors on the internet about a new track called "Maya"... Can somebody send me a link, I'm very curious to hear it myself too!." In 2013, the Facebook page and YouTube channel called "Trance Classics" started a campaign in order to get the first Gouryella single to the #1 position of the Beatport Trance Chart. With the support of Corsten, Tiësto and Aly & Fila, in just a few days time the track made it to the #3 position, with proceeds being donated to the Ronald McDonald House Charities.

After a 13-year break, Ferry Corsten announced the return of his Gouryella alias with a new uplifting trance track called "Anahera", which was released on June 15, 2015, through Flashover Recordings. The single was voted as "Tune of the Year" by the listeners of A State of Trance. "Anahera" also became the best-selling trance track of 2015 on Beatport, the longest number-one trance track in Beatport history, and the first-ever trance track to reach the Beatport Main Top 10. When asked about his decision to revive his trance moniker, Corsten told Fuse: "I felt like bringing Gouryella back for a certain personal tiredness of what was going on in the scene. I was sick and tired of all the 'Put your hands up, put your fucking hands up!' whatever. Without getting too sentimental, I felt like I wanted to bring back that old sentiment and emotion from the turn of the century type-of-thing. I thought it was the right moment."

2015 also saw Gouryella take a leap from the studio to the stage with Ferry deciding to bring classics songs such as the self-titled "Gouryella", "Ligaya" and many more to life in a full Gouryella live show concept. Launching it in Sydney and Melbourne with two Australian arena shows, Ferry then hit the road taking the world tour to the mainstage of the Dreamstate arena at Insomniac's Beyond Wonderland and later Electric Daisy Carnival: New York. From here the Rotterdam native will continue his charge of international festivals as he takes Gouryella to events such as Ultra Europe, Balaton Sound, Tomorrowland and many more.

On Monday 13 June 2016, Flashover Recordings released the sixth Gouryella single, titled "Neba". The track reached #1 on Beatport Trance and #24 on Beatport Main and has been featured in numerous compilations, including Dave Pearce's Delirium Summer Trance and Armin van Buuren's A State of Trance Year Mix 2016. Following the second run of Gouryella live performances across the globe, Ferry Corsten unveiled "From The Heavens", featuring new versions of the first four Gouryella tracks as well as "Anahera" and "Neba".

During his set at Dreamstate Europe in Gliwice, Poland he premiered his next single "Surga", which was released on May 3, 2019.

== Discography ==
=== Compilation albums ===
- 2004: System F / Gouryella – Best
- 2005: Best of System F & Gouryella (Part One)
- 2006: Best of System F & Gouryella (Part Two)
- 2016: From The Heavens

=== Singles ===
- 1999 "Gouryella" #15 UK; #65 NL
- 1999 "Walhalla" #19 NO; #27 UK; #39 NL
- 2000 "Tenshi" #45 UK
- 2002 "Ligaya" #51 GER; #67 NL
- 2015 "Anahera"
- 2016 "Neba"
- 2017 "Venera (Vee's Theme)"
- 2019 "Surga"
- 2021 "Orenda"
- 2025 "Marama (Moon & Stars)"

=== Remixes ===
- 1999: Binary Finary – "1999" (Gouryella Remix)
- 1999: Solange – "Messages" (Gouryella Remix)

== Interviews ==
- Club On Tour @ Vision (July 1999). "Ferry Corsten & Tiësto a.k.a. Gouryella interview". YouTube.
- Lola Da Musica (VPRO, October 1999). "Trance Europe Express (part 1)", "(part 2)", "(part 3)", "(part 4)". YouTube.
- The story behind 25 Years of Gouryella - YouTube (Interview by muzikxpress ).
