= Trance.nu =

- Website type: Online music magazine and website
- Available in: English
- Owner: Nonprofit organization
- Creator: Tommie Podzemski
- Website: www.trance.nu
- Registration: Free, optional
- Launched: October 1999
- Current status: Inactive

Trance.nu was an independent English trance-oriented music site that included news, reviews, interviews and forums.

The site was notable for its compilation releases and interviews with artists such as Tiësto, Ferry Corsten and Armin van Buuren. Trance.nu also hosted the "Future Favorite" segment on Armin van Buuren's radio show A State of Trance, which attracted more than 6,000,000 listeners weekly.

== History ==
The domain was bought in 1999 by Tommie Podzemski to create a free webmail and redirection service. After one year in operation, Ralf Elfving came aboard and they both created the foundation of trance.nu along with a third person, Jezper Söderlund. The promotional work of mailing several labels and artists resulted in interest from Armin van Buuren and Misja Helsloot, and after interviewing these DJs and producers, trance.nu's news and interview sections were created.

The first version of the site, released in late 2000, contained news, links and reviews. In the summer of 2001, trance.nu released their first community website, which included guest-books, private messages and profiles, which took them closer to their goal of promoting trance music. In 2005 Kevin Turner who had been writing for the website since 2001 became part owner along with Tommie, managing advertising and site's hosting infrastructure. In late summer of 2007, trance.nu released their fourth reincarnation of the site with Facebook-like features such as status updates, friends and galleries.

=== End of an era ===
On 9 October 2010, trance.nu announced that the website would be shut down and archived. The reason stated was lack of moderation and maintenance, and as years go on, the main contributors and moderators find themselves busy with other commitments.

The following is the news item that was published:

Trance.nu - it's time to say goodbye

After 12 years, tens of millions of unique visitors, thousands of articles and million upon millions of topics it's time for trance.nu to finally be put to it's [sic] last rest. It's not an easy decision to take, but its something that has to be done to preserve the good memory that hopefully all of you have of trance.nu.

The reasoning behind this is due to the lack of time to maintain the site and that the site need a complete restart to gain its former glory. A task that unfortunately is to [sic] big to undertake within a reasonable amount of time and effort. We all sincerely wish that we could revert time but unfortunately this is the position that we're at.

It's been a fantastic ride which we're sure that no one will regret, we've released CDs, sailed the sevens seas on the trance.nu summer boat, we saw and helped djs rise, we've seen (and maybe helped) users fall in love and join each other in holy matrimony, we've spread trance to every corner of the world but more importantly we made friends, loads of good friend - friendships that will last for a lifetime.

For that we are eternally grateful and would wish to thank every single one of you, keep in mind that you made the site the success it was, not us.

We will apply a technique call sundown when shutting down the site which means that the forums have been put on read-only which the ability to log-in, sign guest books and send PMs will remain for another 2 weeks.

This is to give a users a fair chance to hook up on alternative networks and/or sites to keep in touch. When the time is up we will disable the login-system and keep the site as a cemetery/archive for the time being.

With that, this is the end - the final chapter, the last good bye and the chance for us to tell you all which fantastic time we've had together. Thank you for everything and hopefully we'll all stay in touch one way or another.

Signed,

Tommie, Kevin and the trance.nu staff

== Software ==
The site was based on its own software called omgApi, which was coded and maintained by Tommie Podzemski, and open source software such as MySql, Smarty, PHP and PEAR.

=== OpenSocial and API ===
In May 2008, trance.nu announced that they were joining the OpenSocial Alliance, founded by Google. They also announced the public release of their API, making it possible for other websites to gain access to its data.

== Statistics ==
Trance.nu published over 3,500 news items, 1,600 reviews and 200 interviews. Trance.nu was home to over 70,000 members. The site was solely run off the nonprofit work of an independent staff from across the globe, with 15 volunteers at its peak.

== Compilation releases ==
=== Surviving The Chills ===
In November 2002, trance.nu released their first CD compilation, Surviving The Chills, on Nordic Records sub-label Green. The CD included artists such as Mark Norman, Jezper Söderlund and Elizabeth Fields, combining established artists with up-and-coming talents from the site. The CD was also selected "CD of the Month" on dancegrooves.com.

=== .nu Trance Generation ===
The success of their first CD spawned a second release, .nu Trance Generation - The Trance Anthems Of Tomorrow on Green in 2003. The compilation was designed to showcase new "up-and-coming" trance producers from trance.nu.
