= Betsie Larkin =

American singer-songwriter

Betsie Larkin is an American vocalist, songwriter and entrepreneur. She first gained recognition in the electronic dance music scene as a vocalist through collaborations with producers including Ferry Corsten, Armin Van Buuren, and ATB. Larkin is also the founder and co-chief executive officer of Honeylove.

== Music Career ==
Her first EDM collaborations with Ferry Corsten, "Made of Love" and "Feel You", appeared on Corsten's album Twice in a Blue Moon. Soon after its release, the single "Made of Love" made the top 40 in the Netherlands. In 2008 it was voted the fifth track overall on Armin Van Buuren's radio program A State of Trance, number one on Above and Beyond Group Therapy Radio, and reached the number one position on Corsten's Countdown's 100th episode. "Made of Love" was the second single and the first vocal track to be released from the Twice In A Blue Moon album. There is also an official video. Larkin joined Corsten as his tour kicked off in Malaysia and has joined him for numerous shows all over the globe.

Other electronic dance music releases include "A New Day" with ATB on Kontor Records, "Stronger Creature" with Kenneth Thomas on Tetsuo Records, "Love Again" with Andy Moor, "You Belong To Me" with Bobina, and "All The Way" with Austin Leeds/Starkillers on Ultra Records, and "Play it Back" with Gabriel & Dresden on Organized Nature.

In 2011, Betsie released her first solo album on Black Hole recordings . All We Have Is Now features collaborations with: John O'Callaghan, Ferry Corsten, Super8 & Tab, Solarstone, Lange, Bobina, Sied van Riel, Bjorn Akesson, Giuseppe Ottaviani, and Rafael Frost. Some of the remixers include Manufactured Superstars, JQA, Soulshaker, Save The Robot, and Roger Shah. The singles reached high positions on Beatport and the Music Week club charts, and were supported by top DJs worldwide. Larkin enthuses about the process:

This was an ambitious project, to say the least, but so rewarding in the end. It was really fun experiencing all of the different processes for writing. With some we started from one of my older alternative rock songs. In others I would lay down a very minimal piano with a vocal and let the producer create music around the idea. I only started from a producer’s instrumental on one track, which was “The Offering” with Sied van Riel. The real fun was in sending off a rough version of something I had written, and seeing how it came back to me after a few weeks with the producer. These guys are incredible at what they do, and working with them was a blast!

The album spawned a string of top 10 charting singles and Black Hole released a deluxe edition of All We Have Is Now that included thirty tracks, including remix versions and official videos.

== Discography ==
=== Albums ===
- All We Have Is Now (2011)

Track	Title
1.	Betsie Larkin & John O'Callaghan - The Dream
2.	Betsie Larkin & Ferry Corsten - Stars
3.	Betsie Larkin, Super8 & Tab - All We Have Is Now
4.	Betsie Larkin & Lange - Obvious
5.	Betsie Larkin & Rafael Frost - Made Of Love (Made With Love Rework)
6.	Betsie Larkin & Solarstone - Breathe You In
7.	Betsie Larkin - The Flicker Inside
8.	Betsie Larkin & Giuseppe Ottaviani - Toys
9.	Betsie Larkin & Sied van Riel - The Offering
10.	Betsie Larkin & Bjorn Akesson - Let It Shine
11.	Betsie Larkin & Bobina - Belong To Me (Sunset Version)
12.	Betsie Larkin & John O'Callaghan - The Dream (Ambient Mix)

=== Singles ===
- Kenneth Thomas Featuring Betsy Larkin - "Stronger Creature" - Tetsuo Music (2008) [Also includes: Dirty Freqs Vox Mix; Dirty Freqs Instrumental; Talla 2XLC Remix; Topher Jones Remix; Darude Remix; Torin Mix]
- Ferry Corsten Featuring Betsie Larkin -"Made Of Love" - Flashover Recordings (2009) [Also includes: Radio Edit; Extended; Dash Berlin 4AM Remix]
- Austin Leeds and Starkillers Featuring Betsie Larkin - "All The Way" - Ultra Records (2009) [Also includes: Marco G & Amin Golestan Remix; Fuzzy Hair Remix; Lissat & Voltaxx Remix; Jonas Stenberg Remix]
- Lange Featuring Betsie Larkin - "All Around Me" EP - Maelstrom Records (2010) [Also includes: DJ Feel Remix; Snatt & Vix Remix; Sohrab G. Remix; Joseph Areas Remix; Snatt & Vix Dub]
- John O'Callaghan & Betsie Larkin - "Save This Moment" - Captivating Sounds(2011) [Also includes: Gareth Emery Remix; radio mix]
- Betsie Larkin With Super8 & Tab - "All We Have Is Now" - Premier (2011) [Also includes: Daniel Wanrooy Remix; Loverush UK! Remix; Soulshaker Mix; Radio Edit; Loverush UK! Radio Edit
- Bobina & Betsie Larkin - "You Belong To Me" - Maelstrom (2011) [Also includes Original Dub; Radio Mix]
- Betsie Larkin & John O'Callaghan - "The Dream" - Premier (2011) [Also includes: Jquintel, Jeziel Quintela & Manufactured Superstars Remix; Rafael Frost Remix; Jason Van Wyk Remix; Radio Edit
- Ferry Corsten Featuring Betsie Larkin - "Not Coming Down" - Flashover Recordings (2012) [Includes: Radio Edit; Extended and Dash Berlin 4AM Remix]
- Gabriel & Dresden Featuring Betsie Larkin - "Play It Back" - Organized Nature (2012) [Also includes: Radio Edit; Gabriel & Dresden Sunrise Mix; Gabriel & Dresden Sunrise Radio Edit
- Bobina & Betsie Larkin - "No Substitute For You" - Magic Muzik (2012) [Also includes: Original Dub; Radio Edit; Video Edit
- Giuseppe Ottaviani & Betsie Larkin - "Toys" - Vandit Records(2012) [Also includes: On Air Mix; Rock It Mix; Radio Mix
- Betsie Larkin and Sied van Riel - "The Offering" - Premier (2012) [Also includes: Save The Robot Remix; Andy Duguid Remix; Radio Edit]
- Betsie Larkin and Lange - "Obvious" - Premier (2012) [Also includes: George Acosta Remix; Serhio Vegas Remix; Wezz Devall Remix; Radio Edit]
- Betsie Larkin and Solarstone - "Breathe You In" - Premier (2013) [Also includes: Sneijder Remix; Solarstone Pure Radio Edit
- Betsie Larkin & Ferry Corsten - "Stars" - Premier (2013) [Also includes: Roger Shah Pumpin' Island Remix; Tenishia Remix; Alex O'Rion Bigger Room Remix; Roger Shah Pumpin' Island Edit; Ferry Radio Fix]
- Andy Moor & Betsie Larkin - "Love Again" - Ava Recordings (2013) [Also includes: Andrew Rayel Remix; Daniel Wanrooy Remix; Radio Edit; Andrew Rayel Radio Edit]
- Sydney Blu With JD & Betsie Larkin - "Nightlight" - Black Hole Recordings (2013)
- Lange and Betsie Larkin - "Insatiable" - Lange Recordings (2014) [Also includes: Radio Edit; Extended Mix; Sean Tyas Remix
- Armin Van Buuren featuring Betsie Larkin - "Safe Inside You" - Armada Music (2015)
- Joel Hirsch featuring Betsie Larkin - "Fall Back On Me" - Armada Music (2019)
- Ferry Tale and Betsie Larkin - "Live For Tomorrow" - Future Sound Of Egypt (2019)
- Betsie Larkin and White Zoo - "Tidal Wave" - Magik Muzik (2019)
- Bobina and Betsie Larkin - You Belong to Me 2.0 (2020)

== Entrepreneurial Career & Honeylove creation ==
During her touring years, Larkin quoted she often wore shapewear on stage and became frustrated with its lack of comfort and support, and experience that later inspired her to create her brand Honeylove in 2018.
