= Out of the Blue (Ferry Corsten album) =

Studio album by System F
- Released: November 8, 2000 (Japan) March 2001 (Netherlands)
- Recorded: 1998–2000
- Genre: Trance
- Length: 74:08
- Label: Tsunami
- Producer: System F

System F chronology
Out of the Blue (2000)	Together (2003)

Singles from Out of the Blue
- 1. "Out of the Blue" Released: 9 March 1999; 2. "Cry" Released: 25 February 2000; 3. "Soul on Soul" Released: 9 March 2001; 4. "Exhale" Released: 2 June 2001; 5. "Needlejuice" Released: 2002; 6. "Solstice" Released: 8 December 2002; 7. "Insolation" Released: February 2007

Out of the Blue is a studio album by Dutch DJ and record producer Ferry Corsten, then known by his moniker System F. It was released in 2000 in Japan and in 2001 in the Netherlands on Corsten's record label, Tsunami. Corsten originally wanted to have the album released in October 1999, but it was delayed for unknown reasons. The Japanese pressing contains the bonus track 'The Game', which was later released digitally in the rest of the world on 19 November 2011. Following the album's release in Japan, Corsten would go on a tour of Asia to promote the album.

The album was remastered and re-released in 2010 with a bonus disc of remixes and bonus tracks.

== Track listing ==
All tracks are written by Ferry Corsten; additional songwriters are listed below

No.	Title	Writer(s)	Length
1.	"Lost in Motion"		8:12
2.	"Indian Summer"		5:57
3.	"Out of the Blue"		3:54
4.	"Elevate"		7:49
5.	"Insolation"		6:45
6.	"Cry" (featuring Saskia Lie Atjam)	Robert Smit; Saskia Lie Atjam	4:17
7.	"Needlejuice"		6:36
8.	"Soul on Soul" (featuring Marc Almond)	Marc Almond	7:14
9.	"Exhale" (featuring Armin van Buuren)	Armin van Buuren	7:12
10.	"Solstice"		3:45
11.	"Mode Confusion"		7:14
12.	"Cry Unplugged" (featuring Saskia Lie Atjam)	Smit; Atjam	5:40
Total length:			74:08

Japanese CD bonus track
No.	Title	Writer(s)	Length
12.	"The Game"		4:21
13.	"Cry Unplugged" (featuring Saskia Lie Atjam)	Smit; Atjam	5:40
Total length:			78:29

2010 re-release bonus disc
No.	Title	Writer(s)	Length
1.	"Out of the Blue" (Violin Edit)		8:23
2.	"Exhale" (Armin van Buuren Remix)	Buuren	7:39
3.	"Cry" (Rank 1 Remix)	Smit; Atjam; Benno de Goeij; Piet Bervoets	8:38
4.	"Insolation" (Ferry Corsten Remix)		10:33
5.	"Soul on Soul" (Barthezz Heavenly Remix)	Almond; Bart Claessen	7:10
6.	"Needlejuice" (Jan Driver Remix)	Jan Siebert	6:05
7.	"Out of the Blue" (System F 5AM Remix)		8:45
8.	"Dance Valley Theme 2001"		9:02
9.	"Out of the Blue 2010" (Hi_Tack Extended Mix)	Koen Groeneveld; Addy van der Zwan	7:12
10.	"Out of the Blue" (Original Extended)		6:40
Total length:			78:23
