= Flashover Recordings =

Trance music record label

- Founded: 2005
- Founder: Ferry Corsten
- Genre: Trance; Electro House; Progressive House; House

Flashover Recordings is a trance music record label founded by Dutch trance producer and DJ Ferry Corsten in 2005.

The label was first formed releasing only trance music which included its sub-labels Levare Recordings and Flashover Recordings itself. But in recent years, the label has started to release both trance and house music. The label has 3 new house sublabels, releasing only one style of house on each of the 3 including Flashover Progressive House & Flashover Electro House. In June 2014, Flashover Recordings announced their new sub-label titled "Flashover Trance".

== Sublabels ==
- Aleph Recordings
- Levare Recordings
- Boom Tsjak
- MoodyMoon Recordings
- Flashover Progressive House
- Flashover Electro House
- Flashover House
- Flashback
- Flashover Trance

== Artists ==
- Breakfast
- Coburn
- Dave Walker
- FB
- Ferry Corsten
- Georgia
- Lemon & Einar K
- Mason
- Mind One
- P.A.F.F.
- Rafaël Frost
- Pierre Pienaar
- DIM3NSION
- Randy Boyer & Eric Tadla
- Rockdown
- Ronnie Allstar
- Tritonal
- Yuri Kane
- Analogue Sound Department
- Purple Stories
- Jacob Van Hage
- Sidone
- KURA
- Ryan Sauvage & Erol Montez
- Festen
- Alex Larichev
- Halfway House
- Enzo Darren
- Solis & Sean Truby
- Airbase
- Faruk Sabancı

== See also ==
- List of record labels
