= Elements of Life: Remixed =

Remix album by Tiësto
- Released: Disc: 28 April 2008; Bonus Disc: 17 April 2008
- Genre: Trance
- Length: Disc 1: Bonus Disc: 111:16
- Label: Magik Muzik, Ultra Records
- Producer: Tiësto

Tiësto chronology
In Search of Sunrise 6: Ibiza (2007)	Elements of Life: Remixed (2008)	In Search of Sunrise 7: Asia (2008)

Elements of Life: Remixed is an album by Dutch producer, Tiësto. The songs are remixes of songs from Tiësto's 2007 album, Elements of Life. Originally scheduled to be released on 29 January 2008, it was then delayed to 11 March 2008 and was finally released on 28 April 2008.

All eleven tracks of the original album have a remixed counterpart, with the exception of the song "He's A Pirate", now replaced with the previously unavailable "No More Heroes". Tiësto recorded "No More Heroes" for the Blue Man Group during some of his Elements of Life World Tour concerts. The song is a remake of the song "Heroes" in his previous album Parade of the Athletes. Elements of Life: Remixed peaked at #37 in the Ireland Top 75 Albums chart positions.

== Track listing ==
Disc 1
No.	Title	Lyrics	Length
1.	"Ten Seconds Before Sunrise (First State Remix)"		7:44
2.	"Everything (Cosmic Gate Remix)"	JES	7:53
3.	"Do You Feel Me (Roger Martinez Remix)"		5:08
4.	"Carpe Noctum (Fire Element Mix)"		5:48
5.	"Driving To Heaven (Mat Zo Remix)"		7:10
6.	"Sweet Things (Tom Cloud Remix)"		6:26
7.	"Bright Morningstar (Andy Duguid Remix)"		7:36
8.	"Break My Fall (Richard Durand Remix)"	BT	5:23
9.	"In the Dark (Dirty South Remix)"	Christian Burns	5:49
10.	"Dance4Life (Fonzerelli Remix) "	Maxi Jazz	6:18
11.	"Elements of Life (Alex Kunnari Remix) "		6:36
12.	"No More Heroes (with Blue Man Group)"		6:23

Note: The Carpe Noctum remix is officially known as (Fire Element Mix), it earlier had been named (War Drum Mix) when it was released in the Copenhagen: Elements of Life World Tour DVD and recently mentioned as (Fire Intro Drums Mix) in Tiësto's Club Life, on Podcast 59. The Fonzerelli remix of Dance4Life was previously released on the 15th anniversary compilation of Ministry of Sound on the second CD.

Note: The Bonus Disc is available through the new digital download site of Black Hole Recordings and in combination with the 1st disc from the iTunes Store.

Bonus Disc
No.	Title	Lyrics	Length
1.	"Ten Seconds Before Sunrise (First State's A Global Taste Remix)"		9:32
2.	"Carpe Noctum (DJ Preach Remix)"		7:50
3.	"Dance4Life (Sander van Doorn Remix)"	Maxi Jazz	7:32
4.	"Elements of Life (Airbase Remix)"		8:13
5.	"In the Dark (Shiny Toy Guns Club Mix)"	Christian Burns	7:50
6.	"Everything (Andrew Bennett Remix)"	JES	9:38
7.	"Carpe Noctum (Spencer & Hill Remix)"		5:52

== Credits ==
- "Ten Seconds Before Sunrise (First State Remix)" Additional Producer(s): Ralph Barendse & Sander Van Der Waal
- "Everything (Cosmic Gate Remix)" Additional Producer(s): Stefan Bossems, Claus Terhoeven
- "Do You Feel Me (Roger Martinez Remix)" Additional Producer(s): Roger Martinez
- "Driving To Heaven (Mat Zo Remix)" Additional Producer(s): Matan Zohar
- "Sweet Things (Tom Cloud Remix)" Additional Producer(s): Thomas Blum
- "Bright Morningstar (Andy Duguid Remix)" Additional Producer(s): Andy Duguid
- "Break My Fall (Richard Durand Remix)" Additional Producer(s): Richard van Schooneveld
- "In the Dark (Dirty South Remix)" Additional Producer(s): Dragan Roganovic
- "Dance4Life (Fonzerelli Remix)" Additional Producer(s): Aaron McClelland
- "Elements of Life (Alex Kunnari Remix)" Additional Producer(s): Alex Kunnari, Heikki Liimatainen, Kimmo 'K-System' Kauppinen
- "No More Heroes" Co-Producer(s): Dennis WR (Dennis J. Waakop Reijers) Blue Man Group (Chris Wink, Matt Goldman, Phil Stanton)
- "Ten Seconds Before Sunrise (First State's A Global Taste Remix)" Additional Producer(s): Ralph Barendse & Sander Van Der Waal
- "Carpe Noctum (DJ Preach Remix)" Additional Producer(s): Philippe Babin
- "Dance4Life (Sander van Doorn Remix)" Additional Producer(s): Sander Ketelaars
- "Elements of Life (Airbase Remix)" Additional Producer(s): Jezper Söderlund

== Charts ==
Chart performance for Elements of Life: Remixed
Chart (2008)	Peak position
Australian Albums (ARIA)	172

== Releases ==
Region	Date	Label	Format	Catalog
Netherlands	26 April 2008	Magik Muzik	CD, album	Magik Muzik CD 12
United Kingdom	28 April 2008	Nebula	CD, album	NEBCDX9015

== Unreleased Remixes ==
- Carpe Noctum (Anhken Remix)
- Carpe Noctum (Montana Edit)
- Dance4Life (DJ Shah Exclusive Remix)
- Everything (Progression Remix)

== See also ==
- Elements of Life World Tour
- Elements of Life World Tour (DVD)
- Elements of Life
