= Copenhagen: Elements of Life World Tour =

Copenhagen

Video by Tiësto
- Released: March 7, 2008
- Recorded: November 10, 2007
- Venue: Parken Stadium (Copenhagen, Denmark)
- Genre: Trance, progressive trance, hard trance
- Length: 122 Minutes (4:13:09)
- Label: Black Hole Recordings

Professional ratings
Review scores
Source	Rating
Amazon	4/5 stars

Copenhagen: Elements of Life World Tour is a DVD of Tiësto's Elements of Life World Tour November 10, 2007 performance at Parken Stadium in Copenhagen, Denmark. The DVD was released March 7, 2008.

It was released on DVD and Blu-ray. Both double disc versions cover over four hours of Tiësto's concert in Denmark; the additional footage such as an On The Road feature, music videos, and TV commercials.

The Blu-ray version is Region B encoded, which means it only works in Europe, Middle East, Africa, Australia, New Zealand. Consumers in other countries including North America will not be able to view the Blu-ray disc.

== About ==
The 2-disc pack covers more than four hours of Tiësto's Elements Of Life performance at the Parken Stadium in Copenhagen, along with the footage of the event the DVD also features an extras as well as Blu-ray high definition imaging release available in DTS audio.

Since Tiësto's Elements of Life World Tour concerts are supported by a large amount of modern electronic equipment, the venue for the DVD recording had to be large enough to handle the full scale of the show, this included lightning and an enormous screen where the elements were displayed. The Parken Stadium in Copenhagen, Denmark was an excellent location to shoot the footage for the DVD. With more than 25,000 people present, the atmosphere captured on video resulted in a fantastic impression of what the Elements of Life World Tour is about and alongside the movie, the DVD also features 2 MP3's of the soundtrack. Both DVD and CD feature a broad selection of classic Tiësto tracks like; Love Comes Again, Flight 643, Lethal Industry, Dance4Life, In The Dark and other special features including an "On The Road" footage, TV Commercials and Music Videos.

== Video listing ==
Disc 1: Tiësto Elements of Life
No.	Title	Length
1.	"Tiësto - Ten Seconds Before Sunrise"	8:51
2.	"Deadmau5 - Not Exactly"	5:26
3.	"Tiësto featuring JES - Everything (Cosmic Gate Remix)"	5:50
4.	"Allure featuring Julie Thompson - Somewhere Inside"	6:42
5.	"Tiësto - Carpe Noctum (War Drum Mix)"	7:36
6.	"Unity Street - Say Ho!"	4:50
7.	"James Doman vs. Red Carpet - Alright"	6:47
8.	"Imogen Heap - Hide and Seek (Tiësto In Search of Sunrise Remix)"	6:42
9.	"Soliquid - Music Is For Rich People (Mat Zo Remix)"	6:19
10.	"Tiësto - Bright Morningstar"	4:56
11.	"Miko - Muzaik (Marcus Schossow Remix)"	6:51
12.	"Pascal Feliz - From Inside The Speaker (Part 1)"	3:57
13.	"Starkillers - Killer"	5:28
14.	"Randy Boyer & Eric Tadla - Stemcell"	5:12
15.	"Tiësto - Elements Of Life"	8:18
16.	"Breakfast - The Horizon"	6:10
17.	"Oliver Smith - Nimbus"	4:39
18.	"Carl B. - Life Can Wait"	5:42
19.	"Steve Forte Rio - A New Dawn (Extended Version)"	5:31
20.	"Jedidja - Dancing Water"	5:21
21.	"D'Alt Vila - Breathing"	3:54
22.	"The Hidden Camera (Interview)"

Disc 2: The Sound of Tiësto
No.	Title	Length
1.	"Tiësto featuring Maxi Jazz - Dance4life (Freedom Mix)"	8:20
2.	"Tiësto - Traffic"	4:32
3.	"Tegan and Sara - Back in Your Head (Tiësto Remix)"	6:33
4.	"Tiësto featuring Christian Burns - In the Dark"	4:31
5.	"Tiësto featuring Charlotte Martin - Sweet Things (Tom Cloud Remix)"	6:19
6.	"Tiësto featuring BT - Love Comes Again"	6:06
7.	"Tiësto - Flight 643 (Richard Durand Remix)"	6:49
8.	"Tiësto - Lethal Industry"	3:30
9.	"Delerium featuring Sarah McLachlan - Silence (Tiësto In Search of Sunrise Remix)"	9:50
10.	"Tiësto - Adagio for Strings"	6:21
11.	"Klaus Badelt - He's a Pirate (Tiësto Remix)"	5:41
12.	"Bart Claessen - First Light (Original Dub Mix)"	6:52
13.	"Cold Blue & Del Mar - 11 Days (Sebastian Brandt Remix)"	7:08
14.	"Sean Tyas - Lift (Sean Tyas Rework)"	6:33
15.	"First State - Sierra Nevada"	6:19
16.	"Airbase - Medusa"	5:37
17.	"Simon Patterson - Bulldozer"	6:09
18.	"Gareth Emery - More Than Anything (Stoneface & Terminal Remix)"	6:17
19.	"Nenes & Pascal Feliz - Platinum"	4:03
20.	"Cass Fox - Touch Me (Mike Koglin vs Jono Grant Remix)"	10:53
21.	"On The Road"

== Credits ==
Disc 1: Tiësto Elements of Life

- "Tiësto - Ten Seconds Before Sunrise"
  - Written-By, Composed By: Tiësto, D.J. Waakop Reijers-Fraaij
- "Deadmau5 - Not Exactly"
  - Written-By, Composed By: Joel Zimmerman
- "Tiësto - Everything (Cosmic Gate Remix)"
  - Featuring: Jes
  - Remix: Cosmic Gate
  - Written-By, Composed By: Tiësto, D.J. Waakop Reijers-Fraaij, Jes
- "Allure - Somewhere Inside"
  - Featuring: Julie Thompson
  - Composed By: D.J. Waakop Reijers-Fraaij, Julie Thompson, Tijs Verwest
  - Written-By: Julie Thompson, Tijs Verwest
- "Tiësto - Carpe Noctum"
  - Written-By, Composed By: Tiësto, D.J. Waakop Reijers-Fraaij
- "Unity Street - Say Ho!"
  - Written-By, Composed By: Keepon, Retsiem
- "James Doman vs. Red Carpet - Alright"
  - Written-By, Composed By: Patrick Bruyndonx, Raffaele Brescia
- "Imogen Heap - Hide And Seek (Tiësto's In Search of Sunrise Remix)"
  - Remix: Tiësto
  - Written-By, Performer, Producer: Imogen Heap
- "Soliquid - Music Is For Rich People (Mat Zo Remix)"
  - Remix: Mat Zo
- "Tiësto - Bright Morningstar"
  - Written-By, Composed By: BT, Tiësto
- "Miko - Muzaik (Marcus Schössow Remix)"
  - Remix: Marcus Schössow
  - Written-By, Composed By: Reda Benembarek
- "Pascal Feliz - From Inside The Speaker (Part 1)"
  - Written-By, Composed By: Pascal van Boxtel
- "Starkillers - Killer"
  - Written-By, Composed By: Tinley, Seal
- "Randy Boyer & Eric Tadla - Stemcell"
  - Written-By, Composed By: Eric Tadla, Randy Boyer
- "Tiësto - Elements of Life"
  - Written-By, Composed By: Tiësto, D.J. Waakop Reijers-Fraaij, Geert Huinink
- "Breakfast - The Horizon"
  - Written-By, Composed By: Casey Keyworth
- "Oliver Smith - Nimbus"
  - Written-By, Producer: Oliver Smith
- "Carl B. - Life Can Wait"
  - Written-By, Composed By: Carl Barrdahl
- "Steve Forte Rio - A New Dawn (Extended Version)"
  - Written-By, Composed By: Daniel Joaquin, Steve Forte Rio
- "Jedidja - Dancing Water"
  - Written-By, Composed By: D.J. Waakop Reijers-Fraaij, Tijs Verwest
- "D'Alt Vila - Breathing"
  - Written-By, Composed By: Eliano Daviti, Roberto Scilatti

Disc 2: The Sound of Tiësto

- "Tiësto - Dance4Life (Freedom Mix)"
  - Composed By: Tiësto, D.J. Waakop Reijers-Fraaij
  - Written-By, Featuring: Maxi Jazz
- "Tiësto - Traffic"
  - Written-By, Composed By: Tiësto
- "Tegan & Sara - Back In Your Head (Tiësto Remix)"
  - Remix: Tiësto
  - Written-By, Composed By:Sara Quin, Tegan Quin
- "Tiësto - In The Dark"
  - Featuring: Christian Burns
  - Written-By, Composed By: Christian Burns, Tiësto
- "Tiësto - Sweet Things (Tom Cloud Remix)"
  - Featuring: Charlotte Martin
  - Remix: Tom Cloud
  - Written-By, Composed By: BT, Charlotte Martin, Tiësto
- "Tiësto - Love Comes Again"
  - Featuring: BT
  - Written-By, Composed By: BT, Tiësto
- "Tiësto - Flight 643 (Richard Durand Remix)"
  - Remix: Richard Durand
  - Written-By, Composed By: Tiësto
- "Tiësto - Lethal Industry"
  - Written-By, Composed By: Tiësto
- "Delerium - Silence (Tiësto's In Search of Sunrise Remix)"
  - Featuring: Sarah McLachlan
  - Remix, Producer [Additional] :Tiësto
  - Written-By, Composed By: Bill Leeb, Rhys Fulber, Sarah McLachlan
- "Tiësto - Adagio For Strings"
  - Producer, Arranged By: Tiësto
  - Written-By, Composed By: Samuel Barber
- "Klaus Badelt - He's A Pirate (Tiësto Remix)"
  - Music By: Geoffrey Zanelli, Hans Zimmer, Klaus Badelt
  - Remix, Producer [Additional]: Tiësto
- "Bart Claessen - First Light (Original Dub Mix)"
  - Composed By: Bart Claessen
  - Written-By: Adrian Broekhuyse, Raz Nitzan
- "Cold Blue & Del Mar - 11 Days (Sebastian Brandt Remix)"
  - Remix: Sebastian Brandt
  - Written-By, Composed By - Pedro Del Mar, Tobias Shuh
- "Sean Tyas - Lift (Sean Tyas Rework)"
  - Written-By, Composed By: Sean Tyas
- "First State - Sierra Nevada"
  - Written-By, Composed By: Ralph Barendse, Sander van der Waal
- "Airbase - Medusa"
  - Written-By, Producer: Jezper Söderlund
- "Simon Patterson - Bulldozer"
  - Written-By, Producer: Dave Parkinson, Simon Patterson
- "Gareth Emery - More Than Anything (Stoneface & Terminal Remix)"
  - Remix: Stoneface & Terminal
  - Written-By: Gareth Emery, Roxanne Emery
- "Nenes & Pascal Feliz - Platinum"
  - Written-By, Producer: Nenes, Pascal Feliz
- "Cass Fox - Touch Me (Mike Koglin vs. Jono Grant Remix)"
  - Remix: Jono Grant, Mike Koglin
  - Written-By, Composed By: Cass Fox, Rui Da Silva

== Certifications ==
Region	Certification	Certified units/sales
Australia (ARIA)	Gold	7,500^{^}
Canada (Music Canada)	Gold	5,000^{^}
Denmark (IFPI Danmark)	Gold	15,000^{^}
Germany (BVMI)	Gold	25,000^{^}
^{^} Shipments figures based on certification alone.

== See also ==
- Elements of Life World Tour
- Elements of Life
- Elements of Life: Remixed
