= List of awards and nominations received by Tiësto =

Tiësto awards and nominations
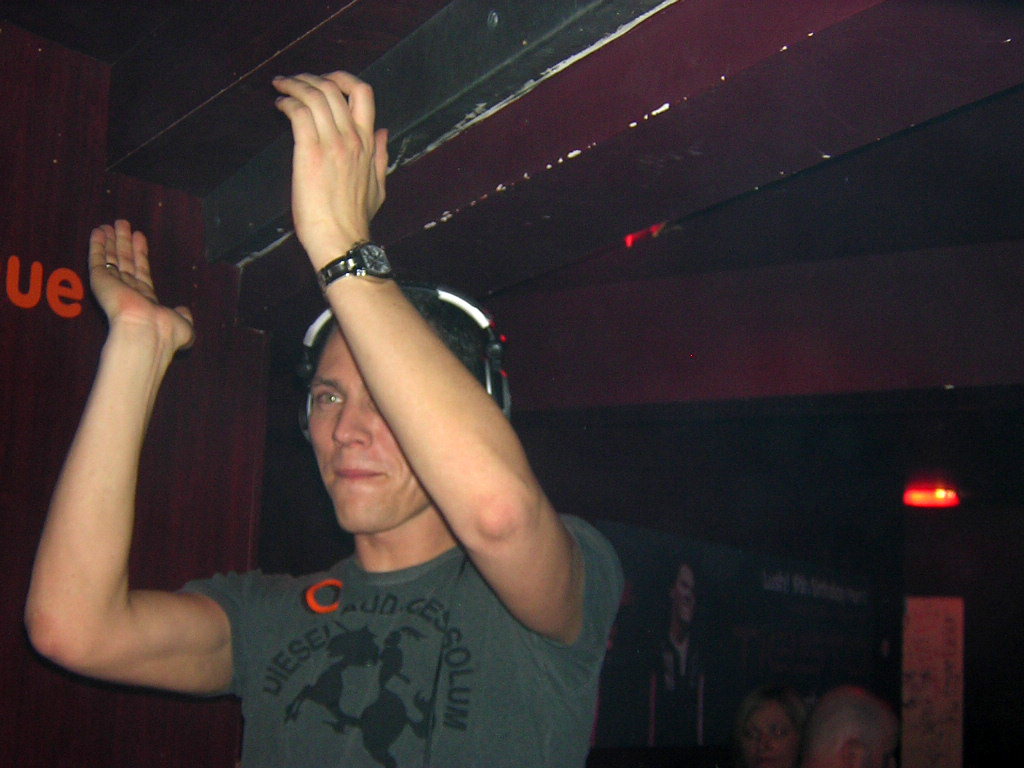
- Tiësto at Lush! in Portrush, Northern Ireland on March 5, 2005.
Awards and nominations
Award	Wins	Nominations
Grammy	1	3
MTV Europe	1	2
TMF Belgium	7	8
TMF Holland	6	6
World Music	1	2
Beatport Music	0	2
BG Magazine	1	1
Edison	1	1
Mixmag	1	1
World Dancestar U.S.A	1	1
Zilveren Harp Music	1	1
Lucky Strike Dance	1	1
Dutch Popprijs	1	1
Dutch DJ	3	3
Radio 538 Dance Award	1	1
Buma/Stemra Sound of Silence	1	1
Ibiza DJ	1	1
WMC Miami	9	17
Latin Grammy Awards	1	1
Djuk	1	1
3 FM	3	3
Dance Music Award Germany	1	1
Canadian Golden	1	1
BUMA Golden Harp	1	1
BUMA Export	1	1
DJ Awards	1	6
Gold Sales	2	2

Totals (Note: Certain award groups do not simply award one winner. They acknowledge several different recipients, have runners-up, and have third place. Since this is a specific recognition and is different from losing an award, runner-up mentions are considered wins in this award tally. For simplification and to avoid errors, each award in this list has been presumed to have had a prior nomination.)
- Wins: 49
- Nominations: 62

This is a comprehensive list of awards and nominations won by Tiësto, a Dutch DJ.

Tiësto was the first DJ to hold DJ Magazine's "No. 1. DJ in the World" title for the three consecutive years: in 2002, 2003 and 2004. Other honours include countless national and international best DJ awards, being named Officer of the "Order of Orange-Nassau" by the Dutch Royalty, and being voted by the Dutch people as their 40th greatest citizen of all time. In 2007, he was awarded with the national Dutch prize of the Golden Harp.

In February 2015, Tiësto was awarded a Grammy Award in the Best Remixed Recording, Non Classical category for his remix of John Legend's "All Of Me". This is Tiësto's first Grammy Award and second Grammy Nomination, following 2008's inclusion in the Best Electronic/Dance Album category, for Elements of Life.

== DJ Mag Top 100 DJ Ranking ==
Year	Position	Notes	Ref.
2000	24	New Entry	
2001	6	Up 18	
2002	1	Up 5	
2003	1	No Change	
2004	1	No Change	
2005	2	Down 1	
2006	3	Down 1	
2007	2	Up 1	
2008	2	No Change	
2009	2	No Change	
2010	3	Down 1	
2011	2	Up 1	
2012	2	No Change	
2013	4	Down 2 (Note: During the 2013 ceremony, Tiësto also won the special award for "The Best DJ of all Time".)	
2014	5	Down 1	
2015	5	No Change	
2016	5	No Change	
2017	5	No Change	
2018	6	Down 1	
2019	8	Down 2	
2020	16	Down 8	
2021	15	Up 1	
2022	15	No Change	
2023	23	Down 8	
2024	23	No Change	
2025	21	Up 2	

== Grammy Awards ==
Year	Nominee / work	Award	Result
2008	Elements of Life	Best Dance/Electronica Album	Nominated
2015	"All of Me (Tiesto's Birthday Treatment Remix)" (John Legend)	Best Remixed Recording, Non-Classical	Won
2022	The Business	Best Dance/Electronic Recording	Nominated

== Latin Grammy Awards ==
Year	Nominee / work	Award	Result
2024	"Bzrp Music Sessions, Vol. 53" (Tiësto Remix) – Bizarrap, Shakira & Tiësto	Best Latin Electronic Music Performance	Won

== Electronic Dance Music Awards ==
Year	Nominee / work	Award	Result
2022	Tiësto & Ava Max – The Motto	Best Dance / Electro Pop Song of the Year	Won
2022	Tiësto - Live from Edge New York City	Best Live Stream	Won
2025	Male Artist of the Year	Male Artist of the Year	Won

== Titles ==
- 2003 40th greatest Dutch citizen of all time
- 2003 Officer of the Order of Orange-Nassau
- 2006 International Dance4Life Ambassador
- 2008 Beatport Music Awards: 2nd Best Trance Artist
- 2009 Mixmag's #1 DJ of 2008
- 2009 Beatport Music Awards: 2nd Best Trance Artist
- 2010 Beatport Music Awards: 2nd Best Trance Artist
- 2010 Trance Top1000: Best Song of All Time (Delirium - Silence (DJ Tiësto In Search Of Sunrise Remix))
- 2011 Mixmag: The Best DJ of All Time
- 2017 Honorary citizen of his hometown Breda

== Awards ==
- 1999 Gold Sales Award (Gouryella)
- 2000 Gold Sales Award (Walhalla)
- 2002 Zilveren Harp Music Award
- 2002 Lucky Strike Dance Award
- 2002 Dutch Popprijs
- 2002 Ibiza DJ Award: Best International DJ Trance
- 2002 DJ Magazine: No1 DJ
- 2003 World Dancestar Award U.S.A.: Best International DJ
- 2003 ID&T Dutch DJ Award: Best Dutch DJ by professional jury
- 2003 ID&T Dutch DJ Award: Best Dutch DJ by audience
- 2003 Radio 538 Dance Award: Radio 538 Dutch Audience Edison
- 2003 TMF Award Holland: Best Dance Act National
- 2003 TMF Award Holland: Best National DJ
- 2003 TMF Award Belgium: Best Dance International
- 2003 MTV Europe Music Awards: Best Dutch Act
- 2003 BG Magazine Award: Best Club/Trance/Hardhouse DJ
- 2003 Mixmag Award: Best Resident Ibiza
- 2003 DJ Magazine: No1 DJ
- 2004 ID&T Dutch DJ Award: Best Dutch DJ by audience
- 2004 Buma/Stemra Sound of Silence Award
- 2004 TMF Award Belgium: Best International DJ
- 2004 World Music Award: World's best selling Dutch artist
- 2004 Ibiza DJ Award: Best International DJ Trance
- 2004 TMF Award Holland: Best National DJ
- 2004 TMF Award Holland: Best Dance Act National
- 2004 WMC Awards Miami: Best International DJ
- 2004 DJUK awards: best DJ
- 2004 DJ Magazine: No1 DJ
- 2005 3 FM Award: Best Dance Artist
- 2005 Release Dance Award: Best Trance/Progressive artist
- 2005 Release Dance Award: Best International DJ
- 2005 TMF Belgium: Best International DJ
- 2005 Dance Music Award Germany: Best Trance Artist
- 2005 WMC Awards Miami: Best Producer
- 2005 WMC Awards Miami: Best Hi-NRG / Euro track
- 2005 WMC Awards Miami: The Ortofon Best European DJ 2004
- 2005 WMC Awards Miami: Best Producer 2004
- 2005 TMF Award Holland: Best Dance National
- 2005 TMF Award Holland: Radio 538 single of the year
- 2005 TMF Award Holland: Lifetime Achievement
- 2005 Edison Music Award: Best dance album – Just Be
- 2006 TMF Awards Belgium: Award for Lifetime achievement
- 2006 TMF Awards Belgium: Best Dance
- 2006 TMF Awards Belgium: Best remixer
- 2006 3 FM Awards: Best Dance Artist
- 2006 Canadian Golden Award (Tiësto in Concert 2 DVD)
- 2007 WMC Awards Miami: Best Progressive House/Trance Track (Dance4Life)
- 2007 WMC Awards Miami: Best Ortofon Global DJ 2006
- 2007 WMC Awards Miami: Best Full Length DJ Mix CD (In Search of Sunrise 5: Los Angeles)
- 2007 Radio 3FM Awards: Best Dance artist
- 2008 BUMA golden harp award 2007
- 2008 Dutch BUMA export award
- 2008 WMC Awards Miami: Best Global DJ
- 2008 WMC Awards Miami: Best Full Length DJ Mix CD (In Search of Sunrise 6: Ibiza)
- 2008 Ibiza DJ Award: Best International DJ
- 2008 IDMA Award Best Global DJ / Best Electronic Dance Album - Elements Of Life
- 2008 Best International DJ at the DJ Awards
- 2009 Best Global DJ:(Idma) ANNUAL INTERNATIONAL DANCE MUSIC AWARDS
- 2009 Best Full Length DJ Mix:(Idma) ANNUAL INTERNATIONAL DANCE MUSIC AWARDS (In Search of Sunrise 7: Asia - Tiësto)
- 2009 Best Podcast:(Idma) ANNUAL INTERNATIONAL DANCE MUSIC AWARDS (Radio 538: Tiësto's Club Life Podcast)
- 2009 Best Artist (Solo):(Idma) ANNUAL INTERNATIONAL DANCE MUSIC AWARDS

== Nominations ==
- 2002 Dance Award by the UK's Muzik Magazine in the category Best Radio 1 Essential Mix
- 2002 Best Progressive DJ at the DJ Awards
- 2004 Best Trance DJ at the DJ Awards
- 2005 Best Trance DJ at the DJ Awards
- 2006 Best Trance DJ at the DJ Awards
- 2007 Best Dutch & Belgian Act at the MTV Europe Music Awards 2007
- 2007 Best Dance at the TMF Awards
- 2008 WMC Awards Miami: Best European DJ
- 2008 WMC Awards Miami: Best Producer
- 2008 Beatport Music Awards: Best Trance Artist
- 2008 World Music Award: Best DJ
- 2008 Best Trance DJ at the DJ Awards
- 2009 WMC Awards Miami: Best Progressive House/Trance Track (Imagination (Tiësto Remix))
- 2009 WMC Awards Miami: Best European DJ
- 2009 Beatport Music Awards: Best Trance Artist
