= Elements of Life World Tour =

2007–08 concert tour by Tiësto

- World tour by Tiësto
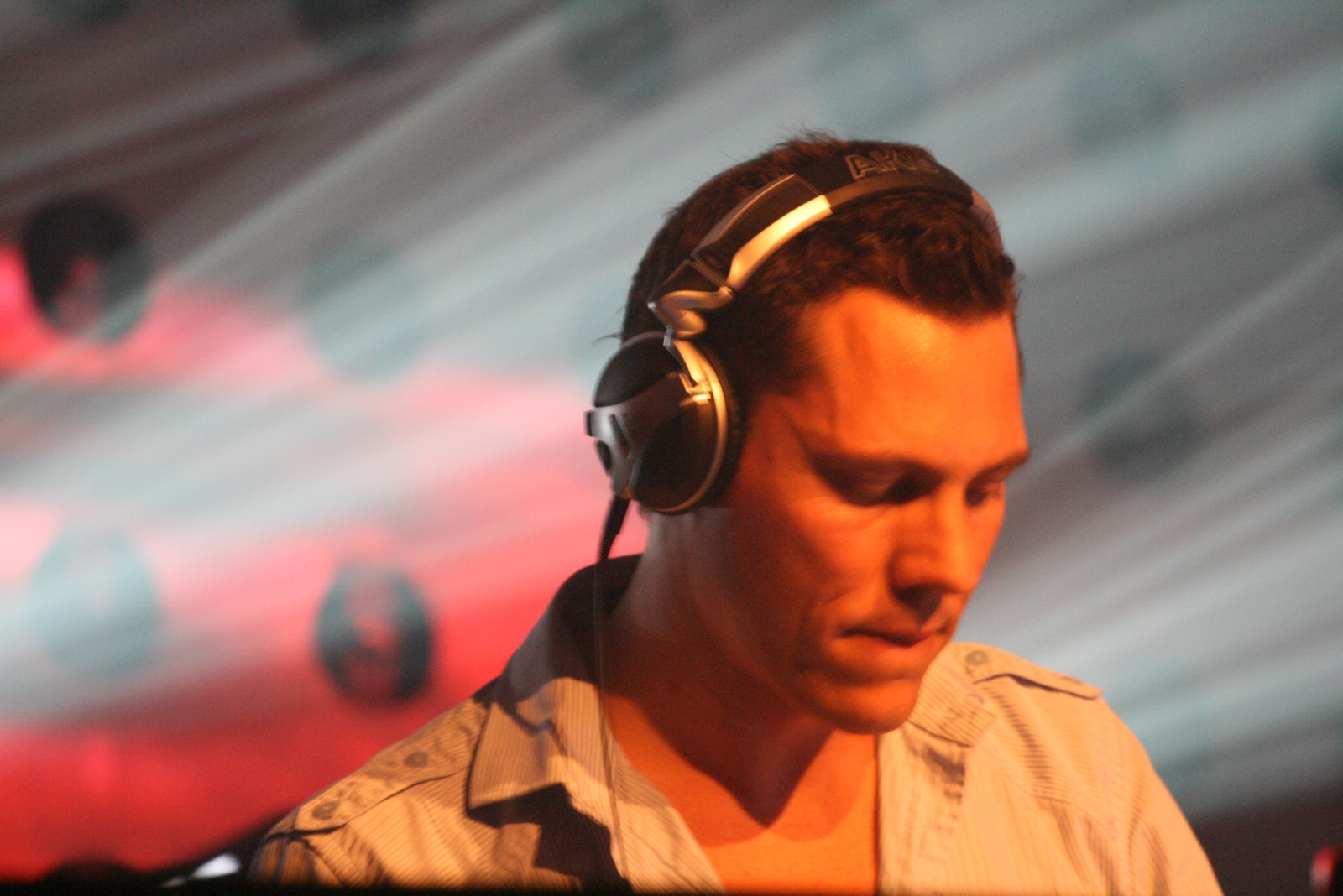
- Tiësto performing in Amsterdam on March 16, 2007
- Associated album: Elements of Life
- Start date: March 16, 2007
- End date: June 30, 2008
- Legs: Total: 5 European: March 16 - July 14; North American: July 19 - September 15; Latin American: October 5 - October 14; Eurasian: October 31 - February 29; Australasian: April 3 - May 10
- No. of shows: Total: 106; Canceled: 4 Africa: 3 Asia: 19; Europe: 38; Oceania: 7 North America: 29; South America: 6

Tiësto concert chronology
- In Search of Sunrise 5 Asia Tour (2006); Elements of Life World Tour (2007-2008); In Search of Sunrise: North American Summer Tour (2008)

The Elements of Life World Tour was a Tiësto tour in support of his album Elements of Life.

The concept behind his latest album Elements of Life also formed the basis for his global 'Elements of Life World Tour'. The show featured state-of-the-art special effects, moving water systems synchronized with the music and high-definition video screens. 3 trucks were needed to transport this set-up across the world. The tour was captured in the 'Elements of Life World Tour DVD'.

South and Latin America brought some of the biggest crowds on his January and February South American leg of the tour. On January 7, Tiesto played to a crowd of 200,000 people in the streets of Ipanema Beach in Rio de Janeiro. On February 16, 2008 he played in India at the Gachibowli Stadium, Hyderabad, which was his first show in South Asia.

== Notable events ==
=== Terrorist threat ===
In late May 2007 the international DJ scene was in a state of alarm after a Lebanese site, Ya Libnan, announced that Dutch DJ Tiësto would be targeted by the radical Islamist group Fatah al-Islam. There were allegedly plans to kill DJ Tiësto during his DJ set in Byblos on Monday July 2 at the Eddé Sands Hotel & Resort. This announcement was later retracted as spurious and based on rumours. Tiësto completed the Byblos gig which turned out to be a huge success and according to Ya Libnan it has "officially become the biggest event in Lebanon's history" breaking the venue's previous record of 16,000 by several thousand – at 2 a.m. the Eddé Sands beach and the neighbouring beach had reached maximum capacity and thousands had to be turned away having to watch from nearby roads and surrounding areas, at this party 18,000 people bought the tickets to watch the concert. In the meantime 23,000 people were outside the zone hearing and dancing on the streets, the people were standing at the last place that the sound can be heard and dancing on the new album Elements Of Life his newest success.

=== Bahrain incident ===
On July 4, 2007, Tiësto failed to show up at his scheduled Elements of Life tour concert in Bahrain's capital Manama. Without prior warning, the DJ left a crowd of over 3000 fans waiting until the closing hours. Ticket prices went up to $250, and fans from across the region flew in to Bahrain just to attend the concert. The concert was clearly scheduled on his website, and tickets were still being sold until the last moment by local organizers Prime Time Entertainment and promoter Ayman Al Hamad. Apparently, Tiësto waited until the final hours to get paid in full by the organizers prior to his performance, but according to Tiësto himself they never did. Shortly before closing moments, the crowd started rioting demanding Tiësto's appearance, which forced the local police to intervene. On July 6 Tiësto provided an explanation of what had happened on his website:

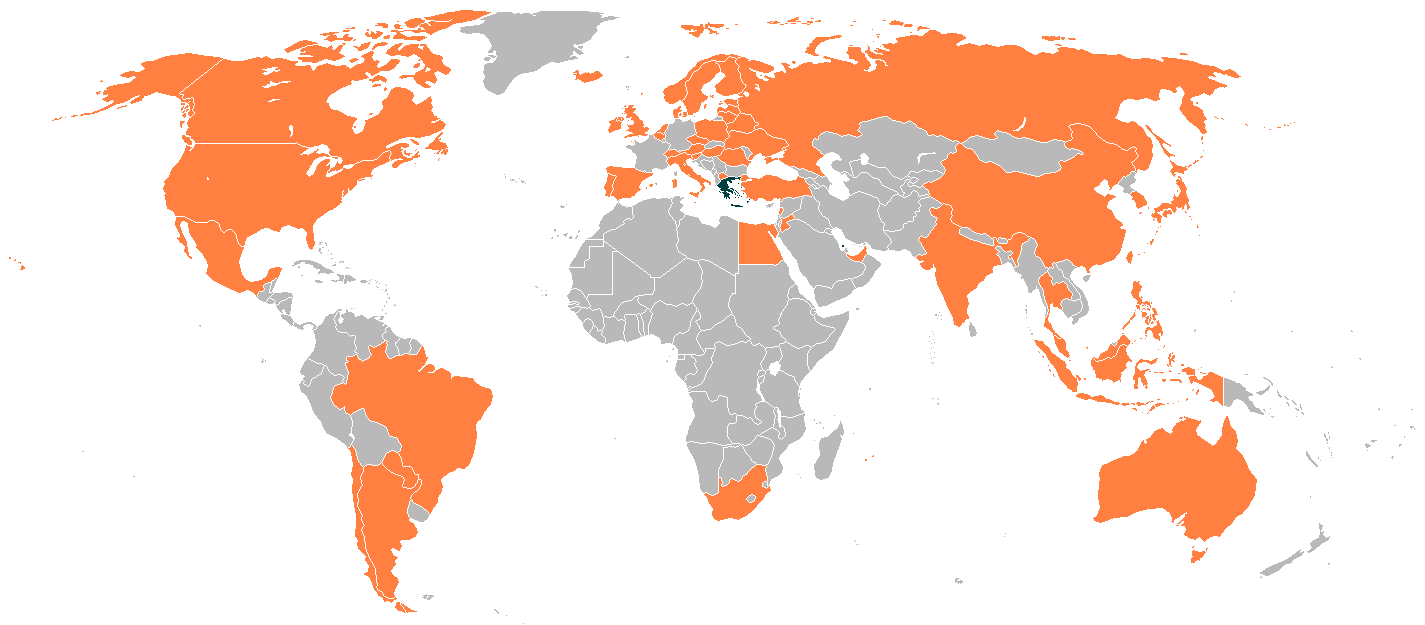
States visited during the tour are orange. Greece and Bahrain are colored dark blue since there were no events held due to cancellation.

Dear fans, I am very sorry for what happened at the Marina Club in Bahrain last Wednesday. Allow me to explain to you what really took place. The promoter disappeared after 1 a.m. with the DJ fee and the money everybody had paid for their tickets. I still wanted to play at the party, so I was waiting for somebody to pick me up from the hotel and bring me to the venue. At 2 a.m., still nobody had arrived and we heard that police was already on the way to the venue. At that moment, I had no other choice than to stay in my hotel room. The promoter tried to escape Bahrain, but luckily he got caught near the Saudi Arabian border. He is in jail at this moment. Again, I am very sorry for what happened and I will definitely try to find a way to make it up with all my fans who bought tickets for the show.

Later, promoter Ayman Al Hamad told Bahrain's Gulf Daily News newspaper that Tiësto was very stupid for the statements he provided on his website, and that he believes that the DJ refused to perform because he was expecting more than 3000 fans to show up at his debut in Bahrain. Ayman also said that the DJ was offered the full payment in parts of different currencies, but refused to receive part of the payment in Bahraini Dinar because Tiësto was not willing to recognize it as a valid currency. Al Hamad strongly refuses Tiësto claim that there was nobody to transport him from his hotel to the venue: "Even if I didn't have a car for him any of the fans would be happy to offer one of theirs." He has announced that legal action will be taken against Tiësto and is also urging witnesses who took photographs or videos of the melee to come forward to assist the ongoing investigation into what did in fact take place. According to the news article Prime Time Entertainment had paid Tiësto 18,000 euros in advance to cover his private jet expenses.

=== Winnipeg bomb threat ===
On August 23, 2007, during the Winnipeg stop on Tiësto's Elements of Life tour concert in Manitoba's capital Winnipeg, a bomb threat was called in to local authorities, prompting an immediate shut down of the concert in the middle of Tiësto's set. Amid fears that a riot would ensue, the Winnipeg Police Department dispatched over 20 cruisers from around the city to control the crowd. The crowd did not turn violent despite fears they would and the party continued outside when local buskers began to play. The building was searched and cleared and Tiësto resumed his set around 1 am.

== Tour dates ==
Date	City	Country	Venue
March 16, 2007	Amsterdam	Netherlands	Luggage Hall
March 22, 2007	Miami	United States	The Setai Hotel
March 31, 2007	Belfast	Northern Ireland	Kings Hall Center; Performance transmitted in Tiësto's Club Life
April 13, 2007	Olten	Switzerland	Metro Club
April 14, 2007	Wrocław	Poland	Centennial Hall
April 20, 2007	London	England	Alexandra Palace; Performance transmitted in Tiësto's Club Life
April 23, 2007	Pesaro	Italy	Red & Passion Adriatic Arena
April 28, 2007	Indio	United States	Empire Polo Fields
May 4, 2007	Skopje	Macedonia	Club Colosseum
May 16, 2007	Oslo	Norway	Club Russefeber
May 19, 2007	Hasselt	Belgium	Ethias Arena
May 25, 2007	Izola	Slovenia	Ambasada Gavioli
May 26, 2007	Budapest	Hungary	Syma Arena
June 2, 2007	Arnhem	Netherlands	Gelredome
June 7, 2007	Ogre	Latvia	Ogres Estrade
June 8, 2007	Tallinn	Estonia	Saku Suurhall
June 9, 2007	Saint Petersburg	Russia	Yubileyny Complex (Canceled)
June 15, 2007	Porto	Portugal	Ribeira do Porto
June 16, 2007	Dublin	Ireland	The Point; Performance transmitted in Tiësto's Club Life
June 23, 2007	Kyiv	Ukraine	EXPO Center; Performance transmitted in Tiësto's Club Life
June 29, 2007	Vienna	Austria	Pyramid City Club
June 30, 2007	Edinburgh	Scotland	The Royal Highland Centre
July 2, 2007	Byblos	Lebanon	Eddé Sands Hotel & Resort
July 4, 2007	Manama	Bahrain (Canceled)	Marina Club
July 5, 2007	Petra	Jordan	Prana Petra Festival
July 6, 2007	Madrid	Spain (Canceled)	Sports Palace
July 7, 2007	Roskilde	Denmark	Roskilde Festival 2007
July 14, 2007	Athens	Greece (Canceled)	
July 19, 2007	New York City	United States	Hammerstein Ballroom
July 20, 2007	New York City	United States	Hammerstein Ballroom
July 21, 2007	Denver	United States	Red Rocks
July 22, 2007	Aspen	United States	Belly Up
July 23, 2007	San Antonio	United States	Cowboys
July 24, 2007	St. Louis	United States	Dante's
July 25, 2007	Houston	United States	Bar Rio
July 26, 2007	Park City	United States	Harry O's
July 27, 2007	Dallas	United States	The Palladium Ballroom
July 28, 2007	San Francisco	United States	Bill Graham Civic Center
August 4, 2007	Miami	United States	Mansion
August 11, 2007	Los Angeles	United States	L.A. Sports Arena
August 13, 2007	Las Vegas	United States	Hard Rock Hotel & Casino
August 18, 2007	Ibiza	Spain	Privilege
August 20, 2007	Ibiza	Spain	Privilege
August 22, 2007	Minneapolis	United States	Myth
August 23, 2007	Winnipeg	Canada	Winnipeg Convention Centre
August 24, 2007	Edmonton	Canada	Shaw Conference Centre
August 25, 2007	Vancouver	Canada	GM Place
September 1, 2007	The Hamptons	United States	The White House
September 2, 2007	Las Vegas	United States	Jet
September 3, 2007	Las Vegas	United States	Jet
September 8, 2007	Chicago	United States	Congress Theater
September 9, 2007	Hartford	United States	Constitution Plaza
September 10, 2007	Cleveland	United States	Metropolis
September 11, 2007	Nashville	United States	City Hall
September 12, 2007	Orlando	United States	House of Blues
September 13, 2007	Detroit	United States	The Fillmore
September 14, 2007	Atlanta	United States	North Atlanta Trade Center
September 15, 2007	Washington, D.C.	United States	Glow Presents Love (Outdoor)
October 5, 2007	Santiago	Chile	Arena Santiago
October 6, 2007	São Paulo	Brazil	Helvetia Music Festival
October 11, 2007	Belo Horizonte	Brazil	Megaspace
October 12, 2007	Asunción	Paraguay	Jockey Club
October 13, 2007	Buenos Aires	Argentina	Parque Sarmiento
October 14, 2007	Córdoba	Argentina	Carreras Outdoors
October 20, 2007	Johannesburg	South Africa	Mary Fitzgerald Square
October 31, 2007	Norrköping	Sweden	Nightclub Otten
November 1, 2007	Sandviken	Sweden	Arena Jernvallen
November 2, 2007	Stockholm	Sweden	Münchenbryggeriet
November 9, 2007	Reykjavík	Iceland	Broadway
November 10, 2007	Copenhagen	Denmark	Parken Centre; Performance included in Elements of Life World Tour DVD
November 15, 2007	Zürich	Switzerland	Night Tennis @ Pulse 5
November 16, 2007	Istanbul	Turkey	CNR Expo Center
November 17, 2007	Moscow	Russia	DK Gorbunova
November 23, 2007	Vilnius	Lithuania	LITEXPO
November 24, 2007	Prague	Czech Republic	T-Mobile Arena
December 1, 2007	Bucharest	Romania	Polivalenta Hall
December 2, 2007	Sharm el-Sheikh	Egypt	Olympic Village
December 7, 2007	Minsk	Belarus	Sports Palace
December 9, 2007	Helsinki	Finland	Studio 51
December 15, 2007	Belle Vue	Mauritius	Anjalay Stadium
January 19, 2008	Mexico City	Mexico	Foro Sol
February 14, 2008	Dubai	United Arab Emirates	Madinat Arena
February 16, 2008	Hyderabad	India	Gachibowli Stadium
February 22, 2008	Amsterdam	Netherlands	Escape Club; Premiere Party of Elements of Life World Tour DVD
February 28, 2008	Copenhagen	Denmark	Vega Club; Premiere Party of Elements of Life World Tour DVD
February 29, 2008	London	England	Indig02; Premiere Party of Elements of Life World Tour DVD
April 3, 2008	Hong Kong	China	Whitehead Club
April 4, 2008	Beijing	China	GT Banana
April 5, 2008	Shanghai	China	M2
April 6, 2008	Chengdu	China	Century City
April 7, 2008	Hangzhou	China	S2
April 11, 2008	Seoul	South Korea	Vista Hall
April 12, 2008	Tokyo	Japan	Ageha
April 13, 2008	Taipei	Taiwan	Nan-Kang 101
April 17, 2008	Bangkok	Thailand	The River
April 18, 2008	Bangkok	Thailand	Club 808
April 19, 2008	Metro Manila	Philippines	World Trade Center
April 20, 2008	Jakarta	Indonesia	X2
April 22, 2008	Bali	Indonesia	Double Six Club
April 25, 2008	Brisbane	Australia	Family Nightclub
April 26, 2008	Melbourne	Australia	Festival Hall
April 27, 2008	Melbourne	Australia	Festival Hall
May 1, 2008	Melbourne	Australia	Festival Hall
May 2, 2008	Melbourne	Australia	Festival Hall
May 3, 2008	Sydney	Australia	Hordern Pavilion
May 4, 2008	Sydney	Australia	Hordern Pavilion
May 9, 2008	Kuala Lumpur	Malaysia	2 Days of Freedom, Port Dickson
May 10, 2008	Kuala Lumpur	Malaysia	2 Days of Freedom, Port Dickson

== See also ==
- Elements of Life
- Elements of Life World Tour (DVD)
- Elements of Life: Remixed
