= Something About You (Christian Burns song) =

Single by Inhaler featuring Christian Burns
- Released: 8 September 2008
- Recorded: 2006–2007
- Genre: Dance
- Label: Data Records; Ministry of Sound
- Songwriter(s): Christian Burns, Curt Frasca and Sabelle Breer
- Producer(s): Jeff Saltman and Christian Burns

Inhaler featuring Christian Burns singles chronology
"In the Dark" (2007)	"Something About You" (2008)	"Power of You" (2008)

"Something About You" is the debut single to be released by Christian Burns.

It was released via Data Records and Ministry of Sound on 25 August 2008.

== Track listing ==
=== Promo CD ===
1. Something About You (MDE Extended Mix) (6:28)
2. Something About You (Filthy Rich Remix) (7:07)
3. Something About You (Dave Robertson's In One Remix) (6:50)
4. Something About You (My Digital Enemy Remix) (7:44)
5. Something About You (My Digital Enemy Dub) (7:48)
6. Something About You (MDE Instrumental) (6:25)
7. Something About You (Filthy Rich Instrumental) (7:05)

=== Promo 12" (1) ===
1. Something About You (J Majik & Wickaman Remix) (5:55)

=== Promo 12" (2) ===
1. Something About You (MDE Extended Mix)
2. Something About You (Filthy Rich Mix)
3. Something About You (My Digital Enemy Mix)
4. Something About You (Dave Robertson's In One Mix)
