= Orkidea =

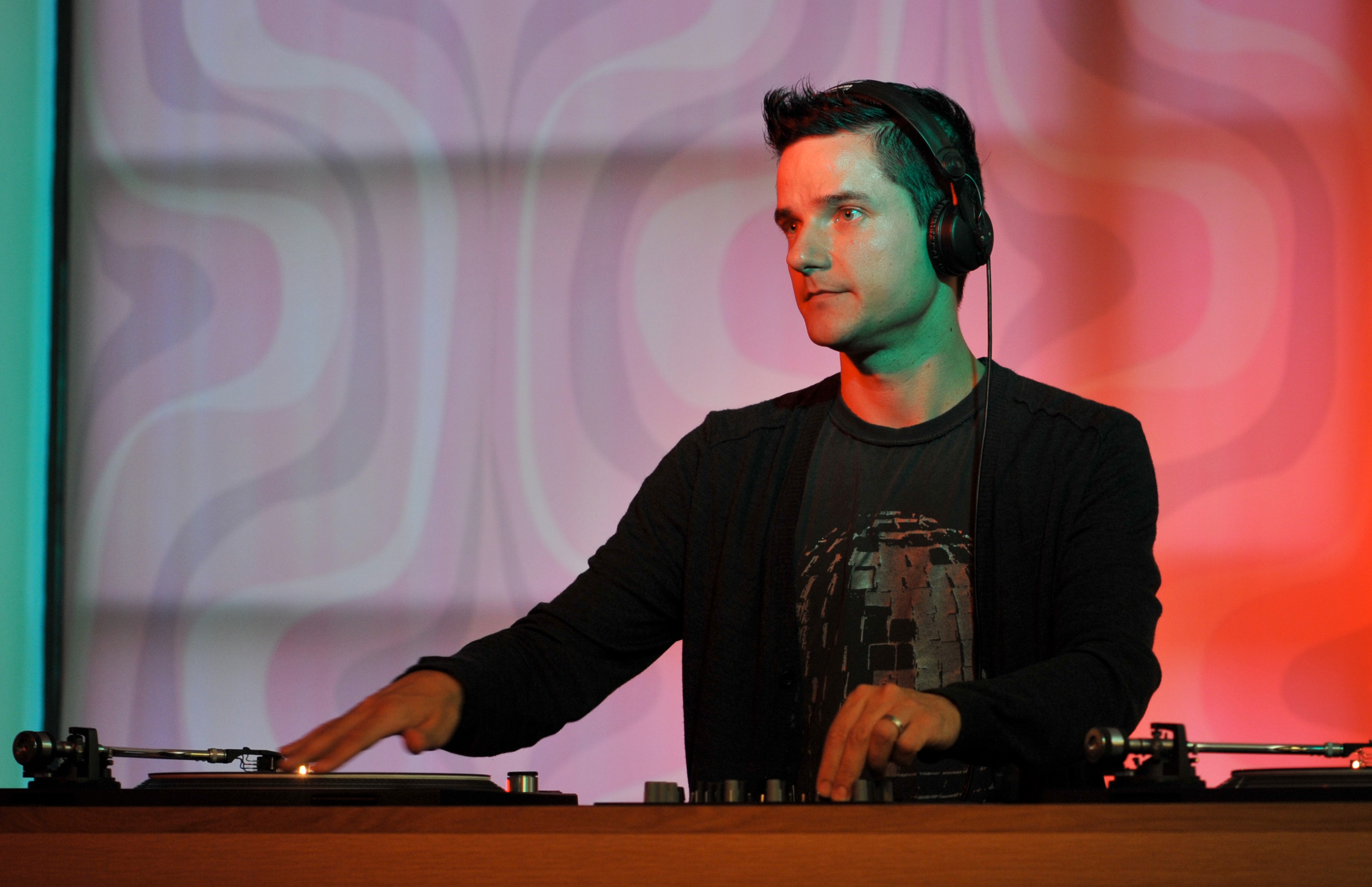
- Orkidea in August 2011

Background information
- Also known as: DJ Orkidea
- Born: Antti Tapio Hakanen; 1977 (age 48–49)
- Origin: Helsinki, Finland
- Genres: Trance, Progressive Trance, Uplifting Trance
- Occupations: DJ; record producer; remixer
- Instruments: Synthesizer; digital audio workstation
- Years active: 1998–present
- Labels: AVA; UMG; Black Hole; Armada; Five AM; Steelfish; Pure Trance; Intuition; Solaris; Unity
- Website: djorkidea.com

Antti Tapio Hakanen (born 1977), better known by his stage name DJ Orkidea (predominantly shortened to Orkidea), is a Finnish electronic music artist. He has been one of Scandinavia's top DJs for over 10 years and has been voted twice "Most Popular Nordic DJ" in the Swedish/Danish Megamind's voting and elected five times as "Best DJ" at the Finnish Club Awards. Orkidea has made remixes for big trance labels like Anjunabeats or Hooj Choons and for artists like Tiësto, Tilt, and Way Out West. He was employed as a sound design manager at Nokia Corporation and as of 2023 he serves as the head of music for the Finnish public broadcaster Yle.

== Discography ==
=== Albums ===
Studio albums

- Music Speaks in Thousand Languages (2005)
- Metaverse (2008)
- 20 (2011)
- Harmonia (2015)

Compilation albums

- Taika (Selected Works '98-'03) (2003)
- Solarstone Presents... Pure Trance (2012) (with Solarstone)
- Pure Progressive Vol. 1 (2020)

Remix albums

- A Place Called Happiness (2005)
- 20Ximer (2013)

=== Singles ===
- "Unity" (1999)
- "Beautiful" (2005)
- "YearZero" (with Andy Moor) (2007)
- "Eternal Love" (vs. Mitchell) (2007)
- "Slowmotion" (vs. Solarstone) (2009)
- "Zeitgeist" (vs. Solarstone) (2010)
- "Hale Bopp" (with JS16) (2012)
- "Slowmotion II" (vs. Solarstone) (2013)
- "Redemption" (2015)
- "Z21" (with Activia) (2015)
- "Glowing Skies" (with Lowland) (2015)
- "Revolution Industrielle" (2015)
- "Strange World" (featuring Sami Uotila) (2016)
- "Epicentre" (2017)
- "Forward Forever" (2018)
- "Metta" (2019)

=== Remixes ===
- Tiësto - "Flight 643" (2001)
- Aalto - "Rush" (2003) (with Super8)
- Tilt - "Twelve" (2004)
- Way Out West - "Killa" (2005)
- Nightwish - "Bye Bye Beautiful" (2008)
- Hans Zimmer - "Time" (2010)
- Nightwish - "11th track on Imaginarium" (2011)
- Solarstone - "Touchstone" (2011)
- Hans Zimmer - "Interstellar Theme" (2015)
