= He's a Pirate =

Theme song for Captain Jack Sparrow

Instrumental by Klaus Badelt
- Released: July 22, 2003
- Genre: Orchestral
- Length: 1:30
- Label: Walt Disney
- Songwriters: Klaus Badelt, Hans Zimmer
- Producers: Klaus Badelt, Hans Zimmer

"He's a Pirate" is a 2003 track composed by Klaus Badelt and Hans Zimmer for the 2003 Disney film Pirates of the Caribbean: The Curse of the Black Pearl. It is featured on the soundtrack album of the film and is used at the beginning of the credits for the film.

The track has been subject to a number of remix versions collected in an EP titled Pirates Remixed and separate singles released notably by Tiësto in 2006 and by Rebel in 2014. Renditions of the track were also used for the credits of the four Pirates sequels.

The track, cut and altered for time, has been used as theme music by the Tampa Bay Buccaneers for pre-game and time-out sequences at home games at Raymond James Stadium.

== Production ==
Hans Zimmer was initially asked to score the film, but since he was working on The Last Samurai, he gave the assignment to his colleague Klaus Badelt. However, Zimmer ended up writing many of the themes, including an early version of "He's A Pirate".

== Pirates Remixed EP ==
Pirates Remixed

EP by Klaus Badelt / Tiësto
- Released: 20 June 2006
- Genre: Soundtrack
- Label: Walt Disney
- Producers: Tiësto, Hans Zimmer

Pirates of the Caribbean chronology
Curse of the Black Pearl (2003)	Pirates Remixed (2006)	Pirates of the Caribbean: Tiësto Remixes (2006)

Pirates Remixed is an EP that features remixes by Tiësto and other DJs of the song "He's a Pirate" composed by Klaus Badelt for the Disney movie Pirates of the Caribbean: The Curse of the Black Pearl. It was made available for download exclusively through iTunes, via the official EP website.

Walt Disney Records also has a promotional CD which contains nine tracks total, including two tracks from the original scores, and radio edits. EMI also was licensed to create a CD which contained the Tiësto remixes and the Jack Theme Suite from the second film's score. Along with the digital download and the limited CD releases, it was also released as a promotional copy on vinyl. The vinyl version came under the name Pirates of the Caribbean: Dead Man's Chest Remixes and contained a remix not available on either the digital download or the CD versions.

Tiësto also released an alternative "He's a Pirate" remix as a bonus track on his Elements of Life album.

=== Formats ===
The digital download had 6 tracks that included a radio edit, and remixes, whereas the Walt Disney Records CD had 9 tracks including 7 track versions of "He's a Pirate" in addition to 2 tracks, the original score of "Swords Crossed" and "Jack Theme Suite". Walt Disney Records also released a promotional vinyl version with 6 tracks including five of "He's a Pirate".

==== Digital download ====
1. He's a Pirate (Radio Edit Remix) - 4:10
2. He's a Pirate (Tribal Treasure Remix) - 8:17
3. He's a Pirate (Pelo Verde Remix) - 5:17
4. He's a Pirate (Pete 'n' Red's Jolly Roger Trance Remix) - 5:44
5. He's a Pirate (Chris Joss Ship Ahoy Tribal Remix) - 4:46
6. He's a Pirate (Orchestral Remix) - 7:04

==== Walt Disney Records CD ====
1. He's a Pirate (Tiësto Radio Edit) - 4:05
2. He's a Pirate (Pete 'n' Red's Jolly Roger Radio Edit) - 3:11
3. Swords Crossed (Original Score) - 3:17
4. He's a Pirate (Friscia & Lamboy Tribal Treasure Mix) - 8:17
5. He's a Pirate (Pelo Verde Mix) - 5:14
6. He's a Pirate (Tiësto Remix) - 7:03
7. He's a Pirate (Pete 'n' Red's Jolly Roger Trance Mix) - 5:43
8. He's a Pirate (Chris Joss Ship Ahoy Tribal Mix) - 4:43
9. Jack Theme Suite (New Score Cue from Pirates of the Caribbean: Dead Man's Chest) - 6:11

==== Walt Disney Records promotional vinyl ====
1. He's a Pirate (Tiësto Remix) - 7:03
2. He's a Pirate (Friscia & Lamboy Tribal Treasure Mix) - 8:16
3. He's a Pirate (Pete 'n' Red's Jolly Roger Trance Mix) - 5:43
4. Swords Crossed (NK & Funky Junction Cursed Square Trubolenza) - 6:24
5. He's a Pirate (Pelo Verde Mix) - 5:14
6. He's a Pirate (Chris Joss Ship Ahoy Tribal Mix) - 4:43

==== EMI Records CD ====
1. He's a Pirate (Tiësto Radio Edit) - 4:05
2. He's a Pirate (Tiësto Remix) - 7:03
3. He's a Pirate (Tiësto Orchestral Remix) - 7:03
4. Jack Theme Suite (New Score Cue from Pirates of the Caribbean: Dead Man's Chest) - 6:11

== Tiësto Remixes ==
"He's a Pirate – Tiësto Remixes"

Single by Tiësto

from the album Elements of Life
- Released: 4 July 2006
- Genre: Uplifting trance
- Label: EMI
- Songwriters: Hans Zimmer; Klaus Badelt; Geoffrey Zanelli
- Producer: Tiësto

Tiësto singles chronology
"dance4life" (2006)	"He's a Pirate – Tiësto Remixes" (2006)	"In the Dark" (2007)

Pirates of the Caribbean chronology
Pirates Remixed (2003)	Pirates of the Caribbean: Tiësto Remixes (2006)	Dead Man's Chest (2006)

"He's a Pirate – Tiësto Remixes" was a separate 2006 single release by Tiësto considered a dance release version of Klaus Badelt's "He's A Pirate" and commercially successful in various European Singles' Charts after release on EMI Records.

=== Track list ===
1. "He's A Pirate" (Tiësto Radio Edit) (4:05)
2. "He's a Pirate" (Tiësto Remix) (7:03)
3. "He's a Pirate" (Tiësto Orchestral Remix) (7:03)
4. "Hans Zimmer - Jack Theme Suite" (New Score Cue from "Pirates of the Caribbean Dead Man's Chest) (6:11)

=== Appearances ===
The remixes have also been included in a number of compilations including:

- Tiësto's Trance Night – Winter Edition 2007
- Tiësto's Trance 2007 – The Hit-Mix
- Tiësto's Elements of Life (2007)

=== Charts ===
Chart (2006)	Peak position
Belgium (Ultratop 50 Flanders)	10
Belgium (Ultratip Bubbling Under Wallonia)	4
Denmark (Tracklisten)	18
Finland (Suomen virallinen lista)	7
Germany (GfK)	85
Hungary (Dance Top 40)	40
Netherlands (Dutch Top 40)	5
Netherlands (Single Top 100)	5

=== Year-end charts ===
Chart (2006)	Position
Belgium (Ultratop Flanders)	37
Netherlands (Dutch Top 40)	17
Netherlands (Single Top 100)	12

== Rebel version ==
"Black Pearl (He's a Pirate)"

Single by Rebel featuring Sidney Housen
- Released: 20 January 2014
- Recorded: 2013
- Genre: Big room house
- Length: 7:16
- Label: BIP Records, Ultra Music
- Songwriters: Hans Zimmer; Klaus Badelt; Geoffrey Zanelli
- Producers: Kevin Leyers; Sidney Van Gool

In 2014, the Belgian DJ and music producer Rebel made a remix under the title "Black Pearl (He's a Pirate)" featuring Sidney Housen becoming a hit for Rebel in France, Belgium and Switzerland.

=== Weekly charts ===
Chart (2014)	Peak position
Belgium (Ultratop 50 Flanders)	11
Belgium (Ultratop 50 Wallonia)	7
France (SNEP)	3
Sweden (Sverigetopplistan)	55
Switzerland (Schweizer Hitparade)	9

=== Year-end charts ===
Chart (2014)	Position
Belgium (Ultratop Flanders)	66
Belgium (Ultratop Wallonia)	38
France (SNEP)	19
