= In Search of Sunrise 5 Asia Tour =

2006 concert tour by Tiësto

- Tour by Tiësto
- Start date: March 18, 2006
- End date: April 22, 2006
- Legs: 2
- No. of shows: 15

Tiësto concert chronology
- Just Be: Train Tour (2004); In Search of Sunrise 5 Asia Tour (2006); Elements of Life World Tour (2007-2008)

Tiësto's In Search of Sunrise 5 Asia Tour was a 2006 tour by Dutch DJ and record producer Tiësto to promote his compilation album In Search of Sunrise 5: Los Angeles.

During the Winter Music Conference, the launch party at "Mansion", South Beach, Miami, on March 26 Tiësto presented his DJ Mix compilation In Search of Sunrise 5: Los Angeles. The tour began with a five-hour set at the international grand prix featured at the Renault F1 Pit on the night of March 18 in Kuala Lumpur, Malaysia. The tour was followed 48 hours later at Tokyo's Studio Coast also known as "ageHa" in Shin Kiba on the eve of the Spring Equinox Holiday. The ageHa Arena was arranged with 38 speakers settled in "Daytona fashion" around a 2,500 capacity main room, he used six turntables and four CDJ ageHa DJ booth, he was also supported by Japanese deejay Yoda on March 20. The third concert was held in the Philippine International Convention Center (PICC) at the Philippines from 9:00 p.m. to 6:00 a.m.

"To us Dutch, the Philippines’ reputation is a religious place. But from the looks of it, I think it’s gonna be a big party tonight."

— Tiësto.

== Tour dates ==
Date	City	Country	Venue
March 18, 2006	Kuala Lumpur	Malaysia	Renault F1 Pit Party
March 20, 2006	Tokyo	Japan	ageHa Arena
March 31, 2006	Manila	Philippines	Philippine International Convention Center
April 1, 2006	Seoul	South Korea	
April 4, 2006	Hong Kong	China	
April 6, 2006	Shenzhen	China	
April 7, 2006	Guangzhou	China	
April 9, 2006	Hangzhou	China	
April 9, 2006	Beijing	China	
April 13, 2006	Bangkok	Thailand	
April 14, 2006	Singapore	Singapore	
April 15, 2006	Taipei	Taiwan	
April 20, 2006	Bali	Indonesia	
April 21, 2006	Yogyakarta	Indonesia	
April 22, 2006	Jakarta	Indonesia	

== See also ==
- In Search of Sunrise (series)
- In Search of Sunrise 5: Los Angeles
