= Lift (Sean Tyas song) =

2006 song by Sean Tyas

Single by Sean Tyas
- Released: September 24, 2006
- Genre: Uplifting trance
- Length: 25:15
- Label: Discover Records
- Songwriter: Sean Tyas

Sean Tyas singles chronology
"Mirella EP" (2005)	"Lift" (2006)	"Reload / Pacifier" (2006)

"Lift"

Single by Sean Tyas
- Released: November 28, 2011
- Genre: Uplifting trance
- Length: 30:36
- Label: Discover Records
- Songwriter: Sean Tyas

Sean Tyas singles chronology
"Believe (Richard Durand Remix)" (2011)	"Lift" (2011)	"Lift Part 2 (remixes)" (2011)

"Lift Part 2 (remixes)"

Single by Sean Tyas
- Released: December 5, 2011
- Genre: Uplifting trance
- Length: 28:33
- Label: Discover Records
- Songwriter: Sean Tyas

Sean Tyas singles chronology
"Lift" (2011)	"Lift Part 2 (remixes)" (2011)	"Rebox" (2012)

"Lift" is a single by American DJ Sean Tyas. It was released by Discover Records as a digital download on September 24, 2006.

It has received support from the top DJs:

- The original mix was chosen by Armin van Buuren to be the Tune of the Week in the 256 episode of A State of Trance, and was played by him a few months later on Armin Only 2006, later released on DVD. It also appeared on Trancemaster 5003.
- The Sean Tyas rework was featured on the Copenhagen: Elements of Life World Tour DVD/Blu-ray by Tiësto.

A new version of the Sean Tyas rework, as well as 7 new remixes were released in the end of 2011.

== Track listing ==
Lift (2006)

1. "Lift (Original mix)" – 8:25
2. "Lift (Sean Tyas rework)" – 8:25
3. "Lift (Bryan Kearney edit)" – 8:25

Lift (2011)

1. "Lift (Sean Tyas Live rework)" – 8:29
2. "Lift (Thomas Datt remix)" – 7:14
3. "Lift (Estigma remix)" – 7:49
4. "Lift (Matt Skyer remix)" – 7:44

Lift Part 2 (remixes) (2011)

1. "Lift (Lisa Lashes remix)" – 6:33
2. "Lift (Sly One vs Jurrane remix)" – 7:02
3. "Lift (Des McMahon remix)" – 8:00
4. "Lift (Darren Porter remix)" – 6:58

== Release history ==
Catalog number	Title	Region	Date	Format	Label
DISCOVER 24	Lift	Worldwide	September 24, 2006	Digital Download	Discover Records
DISCOVER 83	Lift	Worldwide	November 28, 2011	Digital Download	Discover Records
DISCOVER 83X	Lift Part 2 (remixes)	Worldwide	December 5, 2011	Digital Download	Discover Records
