= Most Popular Nordic DJ =

Most Popular Nordic DJ is a voting process developed and run by Megamind, a website focusing on Nordic clubbing and DJ culture in the following countries of Sweden, Norway, Denmark and Finland. The voting process is a way to determine who is the most popular Nordic DJ. Eligible recipients are Swedish, Danish, Norwegian or Finnish DJs, producers or artists who use DJing as a way of performance. Live acts are also counted if they include at least one person who DJs.

The vote started in 2003. The voting takes place between September 1 of each year until January 31 of the following year, making it the longest running vote in the world of its kind.

== Results ==
Winners of the title "Most Popular Nordic DJ" in past years are:

- 2003 - DJ Orkidea (Finland)
- 2004 - Airbase (Sweden) (Voting halted after server crash in December 2004 and therefore is incomplete)
- 2005 - DJ Orkidea (Finland)
- 2006 - Tim Andresen (Denmark)
- 2007 - DJ Orkidea (Finland)
- 2008 - Marcus Schossow (Sweden)
- 2009 - Marcus Schossow (Sweden)

Top 5 winners 2003:

1. DJ Orkidea (Finland)
2. Miss Jarea (Norway)
3. Sebastian Voght (Sweden)
4. Adam Beyer (Sweden)
5. Sekas (Sweden)

Top 5 winners 2004:

1. Airbase (Sweden)
2. Miss Jarea (Norway)
3. DJ Irish (Sweden)
4. Tim Andresen (Denmark)
5. zanta (Finland)

Top 5 winners 2005:

1. DJ Orkidea (Finland)
2. Darude (Finland)
3. Proteus (Finland)
4. DJ Anneli (Sweden)
5. Miika Kuisma (Finland)

Top 5 winners 2006:

1. Tim Andresen (Denmark)
2. DJ Orkidea (Finland)
3. Darude (Finland)
4. Proteus (Finland)
5. Özgur Can (Sweden)

Top 5 winners 2007:

1. DJ Orkidea (Finland)
2. Sasha F (Finland)
3. Proteus (Finland)
4. Darude (Finland)
5. Tim Andresen (Denmark)

Top 5 winners 2008:

1. Marcus Schossow (Sweden)
2. Maku L (Finland)
3. Sasha F (Finland)
4. DJ Orkidea (Finland)
5. CiD Inc. (Denmark)

Top 5 winners 2009:

1. Marcus Schossow (Sweden)
2. Sasha F (Finland)
3. Maku L (Finland)
4. DJ Orkidea (Finland)
5. Proteus (Finland)
