= Dance4Life =

dance4life
- Founded: 2003
- Purpose: HIV, AIDS
- Location: Amsterdam, Netherlands
- Region served: Global
- Method: Edutainment
- Key people: International advisory board members are, Erica Terpstra, Vladimir Pozner, Nafis Sadik, Peter Piot, Tumi Makgabo, Rien van Gendt, Duncan Stutterheim and Eveline Aendekerk
- Website: dance4life.com

Dance4life is a foundation working to raise awareness of HIV/AIDS.

== History ==
The organization claims to have raised money for HIV prevention projects in the Global South

In May 2006, DJ Tiësto became the official worldwide ambassador for the dance4life foundation. He recorded a track with Maxi Jazz (of Faithless) of the same name. The song peaked for five weeks in the Dutch Singles Chart, peaking at number five in Belgium, six in Finland and also charting in the UK and Germany.

In 2009 supermodel Doutzen Kroes became an ambassador. She visited projects in Tanzania, the United States, the Netherlands and Thailand and raised money through auctions.

It was estimated that by World AIDS Day 2014, the foundation had created a total of one million agents4change (a young person who has participated in the dance4life "schools4life" and is involved in pushing back HIV and AIDS).

== Ambassadors ==
"What I like about it is that we raise money in the western world and create awareness in the countries that get hit the hardest like Africa and Asia. The whole concept behind it is to let the whole world dance, which is a very positive message."

— Tiësto to Sterling McGarvey.
- Doutzen Kroes, international dance4life ambassador
- Tiësto, international dance4life ambassador.

- Aly & Fila, dance4life Egypt
- Benjamin Bates, dance4life Netherlands
- DJ Black Coffee and SHANA, dance4life South Africa
- Dj Willber Luno Phoenix, dance4life Bangladesh
- Black Mango Music, dance4life South Africa
- Dare Art Alade, dance4life Nigeria
- Don Diablo, dance4life Netherlands
- Ebby Sykes, dance4life Tanzania
- DJ Feel, dance4life Russia
- Fid Q, dance4life Tanzania
- Jan Kooijman, dance4life Netherlands
- Jesse Voorn, dance4life Netherlands
- DJ Jimmy Jatt, dance4life Nigeria
- Kaffy and her Imagneto Dance Group, dance4life Nigeria
- Katung, Maureen and Gideon, dance4life Nigeria
- DJ Khaled Abdel Rahman, dance4life Egypt
- Marco V, dance4life Netherlands
- Maxi Jazz, dance4life Netherlands
- Metis, dance4life UK
- Nikkie Plessen, dance4life Netherlands
- The Partysquad, dance4life Netherlands
- Sander van Doorn, dance4life Netherlands
- Sied van Riel, dance4life Netherlands
- Sandrien, dance4life Netherlands
- Stella Damascus, dance4life Nigeria
- Tim Westwood, dance4life UK
- Unique Sisters, dance4life Tanzania
- Vladimir Posner, dance4life Russia
- Wust El Bala, dance4life Egypt
- Yousra, dance4life Egypt
- Zahi Hawass, dance4life Egypt
- Zoë Xenia, dance4life Netherlands
- Zolani Mkiva, dance4life South Africa
- Ana Stanic, dance4life Serbia
