= Break My Fall =

2007 single song by Tiësto featuring BT

Single by Tiësto featuring BT

from the album Elements of Life
- Released: July 2007
- Recorded: 2007
- Genre: Progressive trance
- Length: 3:27 (Radio Edit)
- Label: Magik Muzik; Black Hole; Ultra
- Songwriters: Brian Transeau; Tijs Verwest
- Producers: BT; Tiësto; DJ Waakop Reijers

Tiësto singles chronology
"In the Dark" (2007)	"Break My Fall" (2007)	"Ride" (2008)

BT singles chronology
"Love Comes Again" (2004)	"Break My Fall" (2007)	"The Rose of Jericho" (2009)

"Break My Fall" is a single track by Tiësto with vocals from BT released in July 2007. This song is off the album Elements of Life.

== Music video ==
The music video for the song features BT.

== Formats and track listings ==
12" vinyl single (Magik Muzik/July 2007/Netherlands)
No.	Title	Length
1.	"Break My Fall (Richard Durand Remix)"	7:39
2.	"Break My Fall (Jerry Ropero vs. NBG Afterhours Mix)"	8:37

12" vinyl single (S2 Records/July 2007/Switzerland)
No.	Title	Length
1.	"Break My Fall (Airbase Remix)"	8:25
2.	"Break My Fall (Richard Durand Remix)"	7:39
3.	"Break My Fall (Jerry Ropero vs NBG Afterhours Remix)"	8:37
4.	"Break My Fall (Adam Kay + Pettigrew + Soha Remix)"	7:54

Compact disc/digital download (Ultra/August 14, 2007/United States of America)
No.	Title	Length
1.	"Break My Fall (Radio Edit)"	3:27
2.	"Break My Fall (Airbase Remix)"	8:26
3.	"Break My Fall (Adam Kay + Pettigrew + Soha Remix)"	7:56
4.	"Break My Fall (Richard Durand Remix)"	7:39
5.	"Break My Fall (Jerry Ropero vs. NBG Afterhouse Remix)"	8:38

== Release history ==
Region	Date
Netherlands	July 2007
United States	August 14, 2007

== Charts ==
Chart (2007)	Peak position
Belgium (Ultratip Bubbling Under Flanders)	9
Finland (Suomen virallinen lista)	7
Latvia Singles Chart	13
Netherlands (Dutch Top 40)	13
Netherlands (Single Top 100)	13

== Lyrics ==
- The title for the song is mentioned on the lyrics of "Shame" by BT from his album Movement in Still Life.
- "Dynamic symmetry combine" is from one of the verses. "Dynamic Symmetry" is the name of a track on BT's 2006 album This Binary Universe.
