= Sean Tyas =

American DJ and record producer

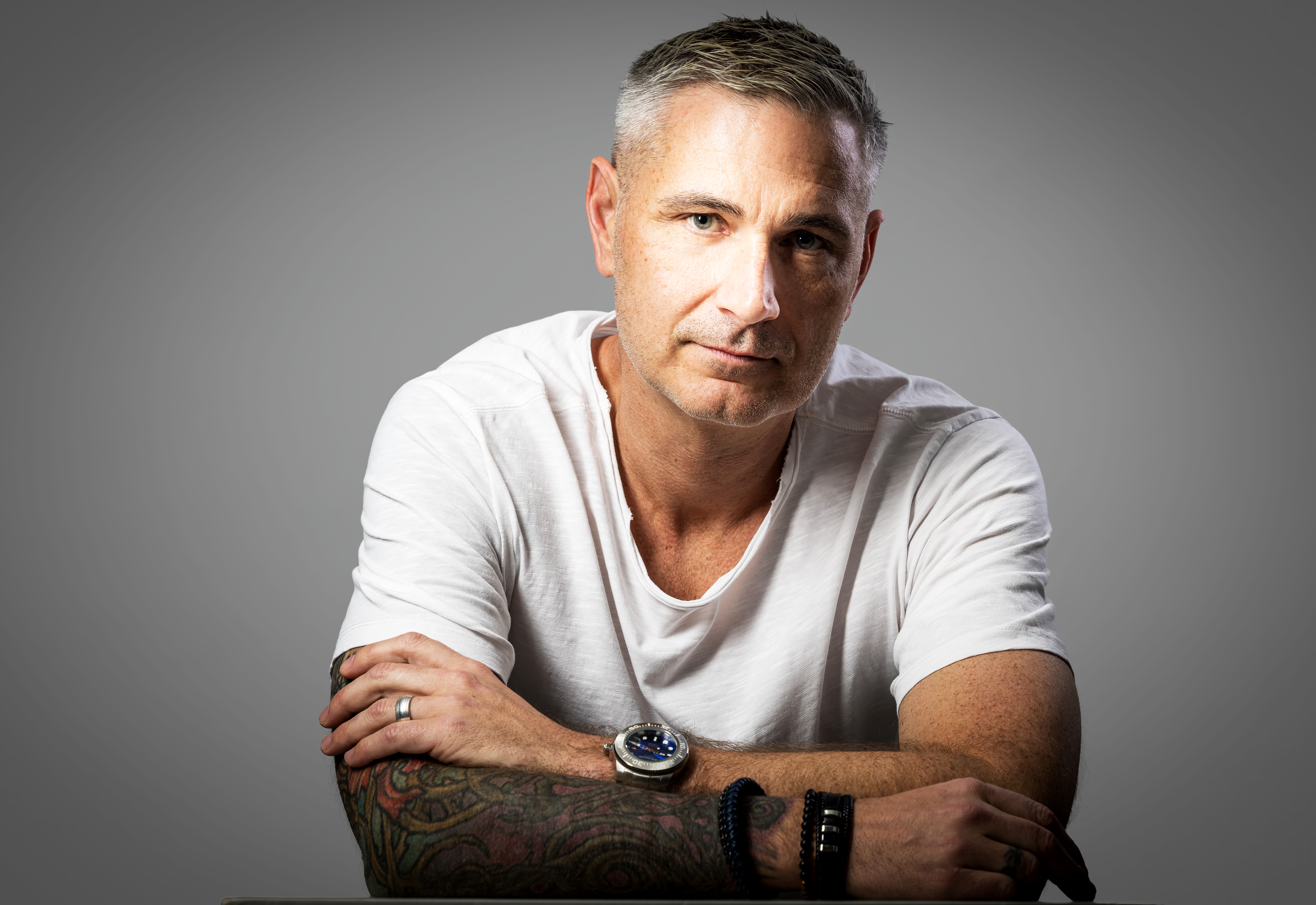
- Sean Tyas press photoshoot, March 2026

Background information
- Born: November 8, 1979 (age 46); Massapequa Park, New York, United States
- Genres: Uplifting trance, progressive trance, tech trance, psychedelic trance, progressive house, electro house
- Years active: 1999-present
- Labels: Black Hole Recordings, Degenerate Records, Regenerate Records, Perfecto Records, Subculture, GO On Air Recordings, VII
- Website: seantyasmusic.com

Sean Tyas (/ˈtaɪəs/, born November 8, 1979), is an American DJ and electronic music producer. His productions and DJ sets are mainly based upon trance music.

== Career ==
Sean Tyas was born in Massapequa Park, New York on November 8, 1979.

He began his music career in 2006, after Dutch trance/electro house DJ, Sander van Doorn, selected him as the winner of the "Punk'd" remix contest. Shortly after releasing his debut single and first #1 record "Lift", Mixmag & Beatport named him "Best New DJ" and "One To Watch," marking the beginning of Tyas' journey to becoming one of the most celebrated names in trance music.

Throughout his 10-year career, he racked up achievements, including a much-lauded BBC Radio 1 Essential Mix to his credit.

His musical output includes five mix compilations albums and an several #1 hits, such as his unforgettable remix of Dash Berlin and Emma Hewitt's "Waiting," and his groundbreaking single "Seven Weeks," which spent an astounding 12 weeks at #1. Tyas is often known for turning a great track into a monster hit of 'titanic' proportions, his remix credits include reworks for early Tiësto, Above & Beyond, Dash Berlin, Lange, Gareth Emery, and a co-production (Intricacy) with Armin van Buuren as well as others.

Tyas' 5 most recent high-ranking performances, as chronicled in DJ Mag's Top 100 poll, are the fruits of his efforts DJing at some of the world's largest venues, including clubs and festivals such as Tomorrowland, A State Of Trance, Ultra Music Festival, Electric Daisy Carnival, Electric Zoo, Godskitchen, Gatecrasher, Ministry Of Sound, Beyond Wonderland, Avalon Hollywood, and Privilege Ibiza, among many others.

In 2013, Tyas released his two singles since 2011, "Lose My Logic" and "Now You See." The latter reached #2 yet dominated the Top 5 of the Beatport trance chart for 6 consecutive weeks.

In 2014, Tyas signed a highly exclusive multi-album deal with a well-known dance music label, Black Hole Recordings. His debut LP was released on Black Hole in 2015.

In 2016, he established and owned a label called Degenerate Records, for a 3 year period.

In 2019, he established and owned a label called Regenerate Records, along with British DJ Activa.

== Personal life ==
In 1991, Sean's interest in electronic music began in Massapequa Park when he heard a tape containing various electronic interpretations of "O'Fortuna." From then on, he began listening to techno music. He took his first steps into music production in 2000/2001, using Impulse Tracker for MS-DOS.

In 2004, Sean moved to Germany to begin work producing for DJ Beam, followed by a move to a more appealing set-up in Switzerland, where he produced several successful singles for Dave202. Sean continues to live in Switzerland, now with his Swiss wife, Mirella.

== Radio ==
Tyas presents an internet radio show entitled Tytanium Sessions (Rebrand of The Wednesday Whistle & Phased Out Phriday program) which airs on the first Monday of once a month on Digitally Imported's trance channel di.fm/trance. This show is also distributed via the iTunes Store in the form of a podcast.

== Selected discography ==
=== Studio albums ===
- 2016 – Degeneration

=== Compilations ===
- 2008 – Tytanium Volume 01
- 2010 – Trance Pioneers 001
- 2011 – Tytanium Sessions - Alpha

=== DJ Mixes ===
- 2007 – Live As... Vol 4 (with John Askew)
- 2007 – Techno Club Vol. 24 (with Talla 2XLC)
- 2008 – Trance World Volume 3
- 2009 – Euphoria: Trance Awards 2009 (with Simon Patterson and Claudia Cazacu)
