= Red Carpet (band) =

Belgian musical group

Red Carpet is a house/electronica production act from Belgium, consisting of DJ/producer/remixers Den Hetrix and Raffaele Brescia, with Ramona Korber on vocals.

== Biography ==
In 2004 their piano-driven track "Alright" became one of the biggest club hits to come out of Ibiza, and in turn became a major dance smash across Europe and in the United States, where it entered the Billboard Hot Dance Airplay chart at #21 for the week ending December 18, 2005, peaking at number 4 in February 2006. It reached #58 in the UK Singles Chart.
