= Airbase (DJ) =

Swedish DJ

Jezper Söderlund
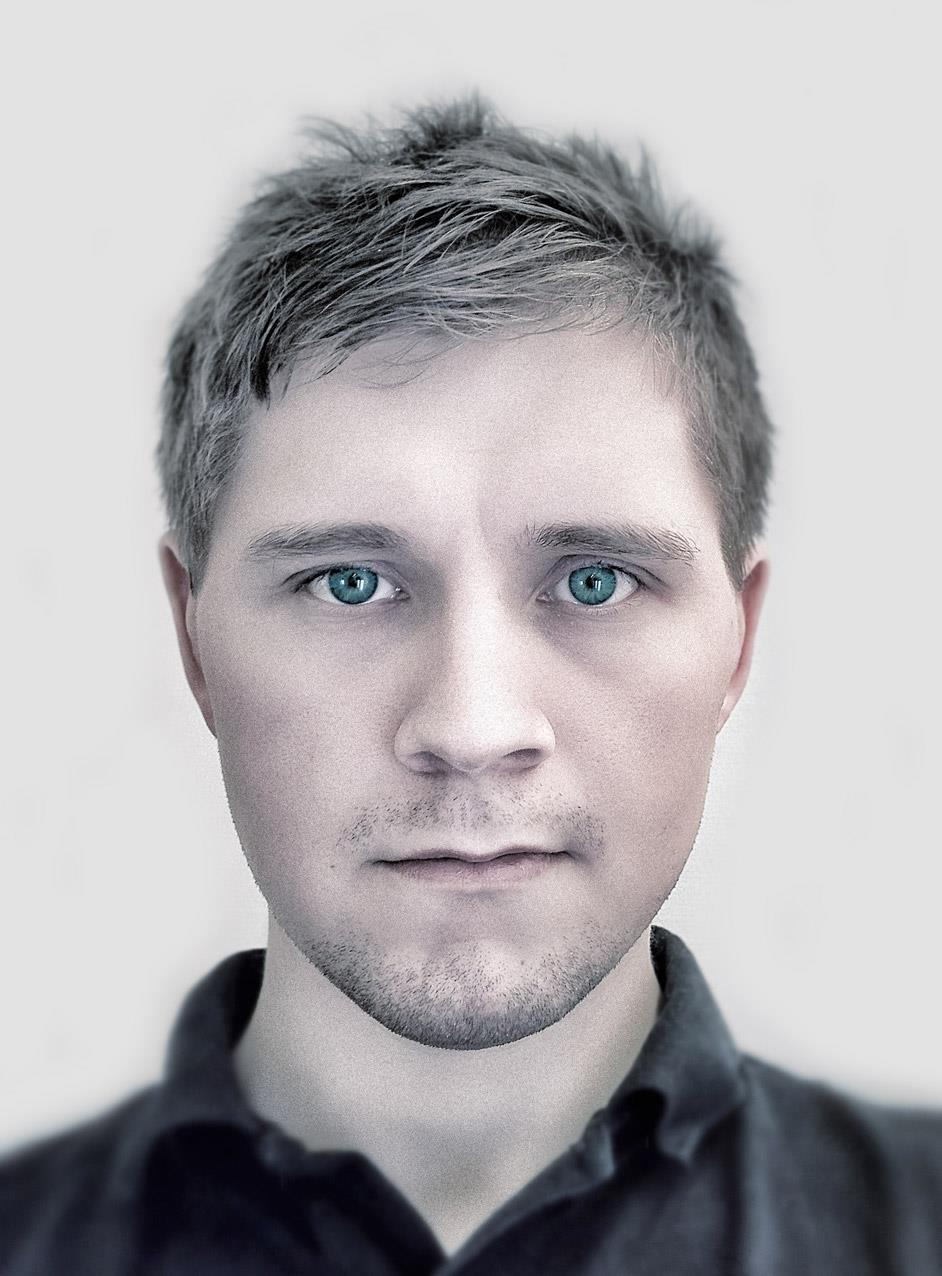

Background information
- Also known as: Airbase, Parc, Jezper, Jezper Söderlund, Ozone, Scarab, One Man Army, J., JLND, Narthex, Mono, First & André, Rah
- Born: Joakim Jesper Söderlund; 27 August 1980 (age 46)
- Origin: Gothenburg, Sweden
- Genres: Trance, uplifting trance, tech trance, progressive electronic music
- Years active: 1994–present
- Website: airbasemusic.com/

Jezper Söderlund (Swedish pronunciation: [ˈjɛ̌sːpɛ ˈʂø̂ːdɛˌɭɵnd]; (Note: In isolation, these words are pronounced [ˈjɛ̌sːpɛr] and [ˈsø̂ːdɛˌɭɵnd], respectively.) born 27 August 1980), better known by his main stage name Airbase, is a Swedish record producer and electronic music artist. His experimentation with electronic music began in 1994 after he was introduced to a digital sequencer application called Scream Tracker. Since 2004, he's been using Ableton Live as his sequencer of choice and he's also known for posting HD tutorials on YouTube with various tips and tricks on how to make the most of Ableton Live.

== Career ==
What started out as a hobby soon turned into a career in the trance scene. His popular works include remixes and original trance productions since landing his first recording contract in 2001. Although it is common practice in electronic genres for artists to use several aliases, Jezper is particularly notorious for having over a dozen pseudonyms. They include Scarab, First & Andre (together with his brother), Ozone, Moon, Inner State, J., J.E.Z.P., J.L.N.D., JZ, Loken, Mono, Narthex, One Man Army, Parc, Rah, and Mika J. However, since around 2005 he's been focusing almost exclusively on the Airbase moniker.

He continues to influence and be influenced by other artists. Tiësto, in April 2007, released his fifth solo album Elements of Life. During the release party, he played one of Airbase's mixes, "Medusa". After that, Airbase remixed one of Tiësto's songs: "Break My Fall".

In June 2009, Jezper began working on his first full-length album, We Might Fall. The album was released on 21 February 2011.

Additionally, he is hosting a monthly radio show called Re-Mix on the online radio station Afterhours.FM, which was later renamed to "Touchdown Airbase".

In 2005, together with his brother, Andre Söderlund, composed the anthem of Sensation event in Belgium under the name First and Andre with "Widescreen".

== Personal life ==
Söderlund made a personal announcement on his Airbase website on 1 October 2008, stating that on 27 September 2008 he had gotten engaged to his then girlfriend, Jessica Ramboldt, who provided lyrics as Floria Ambra for Airbase's single "Denial", "Interfere" and "Wonders".

Söderlund is also one of the three original creators of the dance music website Trance.nu. Jezper is also credited with the base layout and graphics on the Trance.nu website.

Aside from his musical career, he is also known for being a gearhead. Together with longtime friend Tommie Podzemski, he hosts the weekly Swedish podcast "Slashat" where tech, IT, gadgets and web-related news are discussed.

On 5 March 2010 it was reported that Söderlund emailed Apple CEO Steve Jobs directly, asking if iPhone to iPad tethering was possible. The answer, directly from Steve Jobs, was "No".

== Discography ==
- Airbase – Collection (Self-Released – No Label)
  - Parc – Nangiala
  - JZ – Genie II
  - JZ – Maya Bay
  - Parc – Gibson
  - Parc – Silver Cell
  - JZ – My Life
  - Parc – White Feather
  - Airbase – Hypno
  - JZ – Monday P.M.
  - JZ – Monday A.M.
- Airbase – We Might Fall (Intuition)
  - Airbase – Escape (2011 Album Mix)
  - Airbase feat. Floria Ambra – Less than More
  - Airbase – Sun City
  - Airbase – Asylum
  - Airbase – Sand & Sorrow
  - Airbase – Silent Music For Quiet People
  - Airbase – Last Door on the Left
  - Airbase – We Might Fall
  - Airbase feat. Ilana – Affirmation
  - Airbase feat. Empyreal Sun – 40 Miles
  - Airbase – St. Emilion
- Airbase – Lucid (Moonrising Records)
- Airbase – Tangerine / Spion (Intuition)
- Airbase – Escape / For the Fallen (Intuition)
- Airbase – One Tear Away / Rest In Peace / Medusa (Intuition)
- Airbase – Roots (Moonrising Records)
- Airbase – Garden State / Moorea (Somatic Sense)
- Airbase – Sinister (Gesture Music)
- Airbase – Emotion (Alphabet City)
- Airbase – Genie (Alphabet City)
- Airbase – Pandemonium / Ocean Realm (Alphabet City)
- Airbase – August (Airbase / No Label)
- Airbase feat. Floria Ambra – Denial (Black Hole Recordings)
- Airbase – Back (Black Hole Recordings)
- Airbase – Uppercut (A State of Trance (label) / Armada Music)
- Airbase – Modus Operandi (A State of Trance (label) / Armada Music)
- Airbase – Mondegreen (A State of Trance (label) / Armada Music)
- First & André – Cruiser (High Contrast Recordings)
- First & André – Widescreen (High Contrast / Be Yourself Music)
- Inner State – Changes (Gesture Music)
- Scarab vs Inzite – Unity of Earth 2002 (EMT Design)
- Scarab – Vagabond (Armada Music)
- Ozone – Ionize (Gesture Music)
- Ozone – Rock (Gesture Music)
- Ozone – Rock (Take a Stand) (Gesture Music)
- Ozone – Q (Gesture Music)
- Jezper Söderlund – Angel (Alphabet City)
- Rah – Pole Position / Seven (Platipus Records)
- Rah – Glow / Wave (Platipus Records)
- J. – I Scream / Breaking the Silence (Armada Music)
- Mono – Rise (Mondo Records)
- Narthex – Bully (Discover Dark)
- One Man Army – The Anthem / Ballroom Dancer (J00F)
- Jezper – Monastery Hill (Afterglow Records)
- Jezper – Requiem (Afterglow Records)
- J.L.N.D. – The Sound of Nothing (Kompressed Records)
- Airbase – Idun (Record Union)

== Remixography ==
- Tiësto feat. BT – Break My Fall (Airbase Remix)
- Armin Van Buuren – Wall of Sound (Airbase Pres. Parc Rmx)
- Imogen Heap – The Moment I Said It (Airbase Pres. Scarab Remix)
- Majai – Lightwave (Airbase Rmx)
- Stan Void – When You Know (Airbase Rmx)
- Carl B – Social Suicide (Airbase Pres. Parc Rmx)
- Matt Darey pres. Tekara – I Wanna be an Angel (Airbase Rmx)
- Above & Beyond – Far from in Love (Airbase Rmx)
- Blank & Jones – Watching the Waves (Moon Rmx)
- Safri Duo – Rise (Airbase Damage Remix)
- Arc in the Sky – Kissed (Airbase pres. Parc Remix)
- iiO – Smooth (Airbase Remix)
- Lost Witness – Love Again (Airbase Remix)
- Mike Foyle & Signalrunners – Love Theme Dusk (Airbase pres. Parc Remix)
- Lennox – Flying Among the Stars (Airbase Remix)
- Alex Morph – Flaming Clouds (Airbase Rmx)
- Jaron Inc – Nothing to Lose (Airbase Remix)
- Jacob & Mendez – Moondust (Airbase Rmx)
- Mat Silver & Tony Burt – Ultimate Wave (Airbase Rmx)
- Envio – Touched by the Sun (Airbase Rmx)
- Michael Splint feat. Sasha – Secrets Broke My Heart (Airbase Rmx)
- Anergy vs. Nordlicht – In Music (Airbase Remix)
- Double N – Forever and a Day (Airbase Rmx)
- Solarstone – Solarcoaster (Airbase Remix)
- John O'Callaghan & Kearney – Restricted Motion (Airbase Remix)
- DJ Stigma – The Answer (Scarab Rmx)
- Labworks – Ibiza Sunrise (Scarab Rmx)
- Avanto – The Flute (Airbase Remix)
- Inner Motion – Seven Seals (Scarab Rmx)
- Inner Motion – How Did You (Scarab Rmx)
- Simon Paul and Tissot – Love Again (Airbase Remix)
- Unknown Source – Nadjanema (Airbase Rmx)
- Nebulus – Destination Paradise (Ozone Remix)
- DJ Tandu & Michael Parsberg – Budi's Theme (Airbase Remix)
- Kenny Hayes – Daybreaker (Airbase Elektech Remix)
- Matanka – Near Me (Airbase Remix)
- Calanit – Sculptured (Airbase Remix)
- Duderstadt – Mahananda (Airbase Remix)
- Talla 2XLC – Carry Me (Airbase Remix)
- Denleo – Naked (Airbase Remix)
- Jamaster A – Bells of Tiananmen (Airbase Remix)
- Jamaster A – One Night in Beijing (Airbase Remix)
- Shane 54 – Valahol (Airbase Remix)
- Yamin feat Marcie – So Tired (Airbase Remix)
- Arksun – Arisen (Airbase pres. Parc Remix)
- Undersun feat. Mark Otten – Capoeira (Scarab Remix)
- Gouryella – Ligaya (Airbase Remix)
- Tiësto – Elements of Life (Airbase Remix)
- Airbase – Roots (incl Andy Blueman remix)

== Awards ==
- 2004 Most Popular Nordic DJ (Megamind)

== See also ==
- In Search of Sunrise 7: Asia
