= Elements of Life =

Elements of life

Studio album by Tiësto
- Released: 6 April 2007
- Recorded: 2007
- Genre: Trance, rock, pop
- Length: 78:58 (standard version); 99:01 (limited edition)
- Label: Magik Muzik; Black Hole Recordings; Ultra Records; Nebula Records; Kontor Records
- Producer: Tiësto; DJ Waakop Reijers-Fraaij; BT

Tiësto chronology
In Search of Sunrise 5: Los Angeles (2006)	Elements of life (2007)	In Search of Sunrise 6: Ibiza (2007)

Singles from Elements of Life
- 1. "dance4life" Released: 18 August 2006; 2. "In the Dark" Released: March 2007; 3. "Break My Fall" Released: July 2007; 4. "Elements of Life" Released: July 2008

Professional ratings
Review scores
Source	Rating
About.com	4/5 stars
AllMusic	3.5/5 stars
BBC	(favorable)
Entertainment Weekly	B−
PopMatters	(5/10)

Elements of Life is the third studio album by Dutch DJ Tiësto. It was released on 6 April 2007. The album contains collaborations with Jes of Motorcycle, Julie Thompson of Holden & Thompson, Charlotte Martin, Christian Burns, BT and Maxi Jazz of Faithless. BT collaborates with Tiësto for the first time since "Love Comes Again" and Faithless's rapper Maxi Jazz is featuring on "Dance4Life". The album has more tracks featuring vocals than previous albums (excluding the remixed Just Be).

The album was nominated in the category "Best Electronic/Dance Album" at the 50th Grammy Awards. In April 2007 the album moved 72,000 units according to Nielsen SoundScan. The album also received gold certifications in Belgium, Hungary, Netherlands and Romania.

== Production ==
During the production of the album Tiësto in several cases sent a demo with the music to certain artists, and they replied back with the lyrics and vocals and other duration times. In the case of Christian Burns from BB Mak, Tiësto met him through MySpace and got in contact with him and the production of the single "In the Dark". The album consists of rock, trance and experimental music, which shows the style Tiësto has grown throughout the years since his previous albums which contained lyrics, In My Memory and Just Be. Producer Brian Transeau collaborated with Tiësto in three tracks, he composed "Bright Morningstar" and "Sweet Things", he also performed the vocals in the single "Break My Fall". Together, they produce more tracks which were not released in the album, and Tiësto has mentioned they would work again during the coming summer.

It's a very experimental piece of work and combines the style of rock with trance and electronic, this is the first time that I have combined these different genres. I have always liked rock music so it made sense.

— Tiësto

== Marketing ==
In support of the album, he embarked on his Elements of Life World Tour, the Elements of Life World Tour DVD was released in a party which was held on 29 February 2008 from 8 p.m. - 3 a.m. in London at the IndigO2 club. With the successful release of Elements of Life, Tiësto and fashion designer Giorgio Armani collaborated on a limited edition Tiësto T-shirt available at Armani Exchange stores. His single "Sweet Things" comes with the shirt including an exclusive "A|X Remix" by Tom Cloud which shows the great influence Tiësto has in fashion culture. Tiësto and Reebok introduced the new 'Tiësto shoe' in November 2007. The shoebox comes with a special limited-edition Tiësto & Reebok CD, containing the Elements of Life album and the bonus disc. Only 1,000 pair units were available for sale in Netherlands. On 28 April, Tiësto released Elements of Life: Remixed, a recompilation of the Elements of Life album with all songs except "He's a Pirate" being replaced by remixed versions, and "He's a Pirate" being replaced by "No More Heroes", a joint production with mute performer trio Blue Man Group. It was announced in October 2014 that the album would be reissued as a High Fidelity Pure Audio Blu-ray Disc in December 2014, featuring a brand new 9.1 Auro-3D mix as well as a 5.1 DTS-HD Master Audio track. Both surround mixes are presented at 24-bit/96 kHz resolution.

== Track listing ==
Standard version
No.	Title	Writer(s)	Producer(s)	Length
1.	"Ten Seconds Before Sunrise"	Tiësto; DJ Waakop Reijers-Fraaij	Tiësto; DJ Waakop Reijers-Fraaij	7:31
2.	"Everything" (featuring JES)	Tiësto; DJ Waakop Reijers-Fraaij; Jes Brieden	Tiësto; DJ Waakop Reijers-Fraaij; Brieden	7:01
3.	"Do You Feel Me" (featuring Julie Thompson)	Tiësto; Julie Thompson; DJ Waakop Reijers-Fraaij	Tiësto; DJ Waakop Reijers-Fraaij; Thompson^{[a]}	6:03
4.	"Carpe Noctum"	Tiësto; DJ Waakop Reijers-Fraaij	Tiësto; DJ Waakop Reijers-Fraaij	7:03
5.	"Driving to Heaven"	Tiësto; DJ Waakop Reijers-Fraaij	Tiësto; DJ Waakop Reijers-Fraaij	4:42
6.	"Sweet Things" (featuring Charlotte Martin)	Tiësto; BT; Charlotte Martin	BT; Tiësto; DJ Waakop Reijers-Fraaij^{[b]}	5:42
7.	"Bright Morningstar"	Tiësto; BT	BT; Tiësto	8:19
8.	"Break My Fall" (featuring BT)	Tiësto; BT	BT; Tiësto; DJ Waakop Reijers-Fraaij^{[b]}	7:14
9.	"In the Dark" (featuring Christian Burns)	Tiësto; Christian Burns; DJ Waakop Reijers-Fraaij	Tiësto; DJ Waakop Reijers-Fraaij	4:36
10.	"dance4life" (featuring Maxi Jazz)	Maxi Jazz; Tiësto; DJ Waakop Reijers-Fraaij	Tiësto; DJ Waakop Reijers-Fraaij	5:22
11.	"Elements of Life"	Tiësto; Geert Huinink; DJ Waakop Reijers-Fraaij	Tiësto; DJ Waakop Reijers-Fraaij	8:25
12.	"He's a Pirate" (Tiësto Remix) (bonus track)	Hans Zimmer; Klaus Badelt; Geoffrey Zanelli	Tiësto^{[c]}	7:01

Limited edition bonus disc
No.	Title	Length
1.	"Everything" (featuring JES) (acoustic version)	3:34
2.	"Dance4life" (featuring Maxi Jazz) (Fonzerelli Remix)	7:48
3.	"Lethal Industry" (Richard Durand Remix)	8:41

Notes

- ^{^[a]} signifies a vocal producer
- ^{^[b]} signifies an additional producer
- ^{^[c]} signifies a remixer
- In some territories (including the United States), track 12 is "He's a Pirate" (7:00), a remix of the theme music of Pirates of the Caribbean: The Curse of the Black Pearl also featured on the CD single, and on initial retail shipments of Best Buy's exclusive version of the movie soundtrack. "Everything (Acoustic Version)" is excluded.
- The Limited Edition version contains the original album with the remix of "He's a Pirate" and a bonus disc.

== Charts ==
=== Weekly charts ===
Chart (2007–2008)	Peak position
Australian Albums (ARIA)	161
Australian Dance Albums (ARIA)	15
Austrian Albums (Ö3 Austria)	44
Belgian Albums (Ultratop Flanders)	3
Belgian Albums (Ultratop Wallonia)	3
Canadian Albums (Nielsen SoundScan)	24
Dutch Albums (Album Top 100)	1
European Albums (Billboard)	15
Finnish Albums (Suomen virallinen lista)	40
German Albums (Offizielle Top 100)	62
Greek Albums (IFPI)	2
Hungarian Albums (MAHASZ)	3
Irish Albums (IRMA)	5
Mexican Albums (Top 100 Mexico)	13
Norwegian Albums (VG-lista)	26
Polish Albums (ZPAV)	15
Scottish Albums (OCC)	14
Swiss Albums (Schweizer Hitparade)	77
UK Albums (OCC)	14
UK Dance Albums (OCC)	2
UK Independent Albums (OCC)	1
US Billboard 200	71
US Independent Albums (Billboard)	7
US Top Dance Albums (Billboard)	1

=== Year-end charts ===
Chart (2007)	Position
Belgian Albums (Ultratop Flanders)	27
Belgian Albums (Ultratop Wallonia)	24
Dutch Albums (Album Top 100)	23
US Top Dance/Electronic Albums (Billboard)	10

== Certifications ==
Region	Certification	Certified units/sales
Belgium (BRMA)	Gold	25,000^{*}
Canada (Music Canada)	Gold	50,000^{^}
Hungary (MAHASZ)	Gold	3,000^{^}
Netherlands (NVPI)	Gold	35,000^{^}
Poland (ZPAV)	Gold	10,000^{*}
United Kingdom (BPI)	Silver	60,000^{*}
^{*} Sales figures based on certification alone.^{^} Shipments figures based on certification alone.

== Release history ==
Region	Date	Label	Format	Catalog
Netherlands	6 April 2007	Magik Muzik	Standard edition CD	Magik Muzik CD 07
Netherlands	6 April 2007	Magik Muzik	Standard edition CD	Magik Muzik CD 07S
Netherlands	6 April 2007	Magik Muzik	Limited edition CD with bonus disc	Magik Muzik CD 07/2
Netherlands	19 June 2007	Magik Muzik	Limited edition 4×vinyl LP	Magik Muzik LP 07
Netherlands	2007	Magik Muzik	Limited edition CD	CD 07RBK
Japan	28 March 2007	Magik Muzik	CD	Magik Muzik CD 07
Japan	28 March 2007	Superb Trax	2×CD	AVCD-23213-4
Japan	28 March 2007	Avex Taiwan Inc.	CD+DVD	AVICD60439DB
Russia	2007	Dance Planet Ltd.	CD	DP068-07
Germany	6 April 2007	Kontor	CD	0180732KON
United Kingdom	16 April 2007	Nebula	CD	NEBCD9015
United Kingdom	May 2007	Nebula	2×12" vinyl sampler	NEBT9015
United Kingdom	May 2007	Nebula	2×12" vinyl sampler	NEBTX9015
Norway	2007	DJ Beat	CD	DJB077CD
Lithuania	15 May 2007	Bomba	CD	BBCD225
United States	10 April 2007	Ultra	CD	UL 1515–2
Romania	10 April 2007	NRG!A	CD	4088–2
Romania	10 April 2007	Roton	CD	4088–2

== See also ==
- Elements of Life World Tour
- Elements of Life World Tour DVD
- Elements of Life: Remixed
