= Dance4life (song) =

"dance4life"

Single by Tiësto featuring Maxi Jazz

from the album Elements of Life
- Released: 18 August 2006 (Netherlands)
- Recorded: 2006
- Genre: Progressive trance
- Length: 3:34
- Label: Magik Muzik; Black Hole; Kontor
- Songwriter(s): Tijs Verwest; Dennis Waakop Reijers; Maxwell Fraser
- Producer(s): Tiësto; DJ Waakop Reijers

Tiësto singles chronology
"UR" / "A Tear in the Open" (2005)	"dance4life" (2006)	"He's a Pirate" (2006)

"dance4life" is a song recorded by Tiësto featuring vocals by Maxi Jazz of Faithless. As of May 2006, Tiësto is the official worldwide ambassador for the dance4life foundation. dance4life is an initiative originating in the Netherlands designed to increase awareness of HIV and AIDS in secondary school-aged youth.

Kofi Annan, then Secretary General of the United Nations said about the song

"dance4life" is a wonderful example of how the talent and strength of young people can energise our strengths.

The video for the song is a demonstration of the small world phenomenon, which is an important concept in the widespread transmission of HIV and AIDS. The original edit of the video demonstrates a link of 6 people from Tiësto back to himself, however the normally broadcast version of it cuts his first appearance out, as well as removing the mention of the phenomenon.

In 2008 Tiësto mixed a new version of dance4life, it is featured in the Elements of Life World Tour DVD as "dance4life (Freedom Mix)". This new mixed version appears in the promotional video for dance4life.

== Formats and track listings ==
Xbox Live Marketplace

The video is also available for download from the Xbox Live Marketplace.

=== CD, Maxi Singles ===
All tracks are written by Tiësto, DJ Waakop Reijers

CD, Maxi (Magik Muzik/18 August 2006/Netherlands)
No.	Title	Length
1.	"Dance4life (Radio Edit)"	3:34
2.	"Dance4life (12" Mix)"	7:41
3.	"Dance4life (Slow Mix)"	6:15

All tracks are written by Tiësto, DJ Waakop Reijers

CD, Maxi (Nebula/30 October 2006/UK)
No.	Title	Length
1.	"Dance4life (Radio Edit)"	3:34
2.	"Dance4life (12" Mix)"	7:41
3.	"Dance4life (Sander van Doorn Remix)"	7:35
4.	"Dance4life (Fonzerelli Remix)"	7:46
5.	"Dance4life (Global Experience Remix)"	7:50

=== 12" Vinyl ===
All tracks are written by Tiësto, DJ Waakop Reijers

12" Vinyl (Magik Muzik/9 October 2006/Netherlands)
No.	Title	Length
1.	"Dance4life (Fonzerelli Remix)"	7:46
2.	"Dance4life (Global Experience Remix)"	7:50

All tracks are written by Tiësto, DJ Waakop Reijers

12" Vinyl (Magik Muzik & Kontor Records/21 August 2006/Netherlands & Germany)
No.	Title	Length
1.	"Dance4life (12" Mix)"	7:41
2.	"Dance4life" (Slow Mix)"	6:15

All tracks are written by Tiësto, DJ Waakop Reijers

12" Vinyl (Nebula/30 October 2006/UK)
No.	Title	Length
1.	"Dance4life (12" Mix)"	7:41
2.	"Dance4life (Sander van Doorn Remix)"	7:35

=== Limited Edition ===
All tracks are written by Tiësto, DJ Waakop Reijers

Limited Fan Edition (Kontor Records/29 September 2006/Germany)
No.	Title	Length
1.	"Dance4life (Radio Edit)"	3:34
2.	"Dance4life (12" Mix)"	7:41
3.	"Dance4life (Sander van Doorn Remix)"	7:35
4.	"Dance4life (Fonzerelli Remix)"	7:46
5.	"Dance4life (Global Experience Remix)"	7:50
6.	"Dance4life (Video) [Long Version]"	4:23
7.	"Photo Gallery"

== Charts ==
The song debuted at number 21 in the Netherlands, to peak for 5 consecutive weeks at number 3. It stayed eleven weeks in the top ten.

=== Weekly charts ===
Chart (2006)	Peak position
Australia (ARIA)	89
Belgium (Ultratop 50 Flanders)	5
Belgium (Ultratop 50 Wallonia)	20
Finland (Suomen virallinen lista)	6
Germany (GfK)	74
Greece (IFPI)	2
Hungary (Dance Top 40)	3
Hungary (Single Top 40)	1
Netherlands (Dutch Top 40)	3
Netherlands (Single Top 100)	4
UK Singles (OCC)	67

=== Year-end charts ===
Chart (2006)	Position
Belgium (Ultratop Flanders)	43
Belgium (Ultratop Wallonia)	91
Hungary (Dance Top 100)	44
Netherlands (Dutch Top 40)	9
Netherlands (Single Top 100)	17
