= Tiësto's Club Life =

Club Life
- Other names: Club Nouveau
- Genre: Electronic dance music
- Running time: One hour
- Country of origin: Netherlands
- Home station: Radio 538
- Hosted by: Tiësto
- Starring: Tiësto & Various Artists
- Announcer: Tiësto
- Created by: Tiësto and Radio 538
- Original release: 6 April 2007 – 27 December 2025
- No. of episodes: 978
- Website: Radio 538 (ended) http://538.tiestoworld.nl/ 3FM (episode 204 to 417. ENDED) http://3fm.tiestoworld.nl/ Radio 538 (episode 422 and so on) http://www.538.nl/programma/115/clublife-by-tiesto

Tiësto's Club Life was Dutch DJ Tiësto's weekly radio show that was formerly broadcast on Radio 538 in the Netherlands. It was broadcast on 3FM, but in 2015, Tiësto came back to Radio 538. The show started broadcasting on 6 April 2007 every Friday evening, from 10 PM CET to midnight. The show was also frequently broadcast on the Sirius and XM satellite radio channel Electric AREA and syndicated to more than 350 other stations in 77 countries. The show was originally called Club Nouveau for the first five episodes before being renamed Club Life.

Until July 2019, the show was split into two parts. The first hour featured a mix of current hits, and in the second hour Tiësto presented a variety of electronic genres, including minimal, house and trance. The free podcast was released the following Monday on iTunes as well as on Xbox Music without the 15 Minutes of Fame.

1worldspace and Sirius Satellite Radio/XM Satellite Radio in the United States later started broadcasting the show. It was broadcast on Electric Area (Channel 52 on Sirius and XM) as part of their Global Domination lineup on Saturday nights. The show was broadcast on Radio 538 on Friday nights between 22:00 CET and midnight and on Electric Area on Saturday nights between 10:00 p.m. ET and 12:00 a.m. ET. The first hour was also available as a podcast on the Radio 538 website and on iTunes audio podcasts.

Since July 2019, the show lasted one hour.

In 2012, Tiësto launched Tiësto's Club Life Radio, a 24/7 commercial-free music channel. The channel features a variety of electronic dance music including progressive house, electro, trance and downtempo, all selected by Tiësto. Other DJs also appear on the channel. Tiësto's Club Life Radio was available in the Dance/Electronic category through the SiriusXM App for smartphones and mobile devices, and on channel 340 on Edge satellite radios and on SiriusXM Internet Radio. The channel left the air and the SiriusXM lineup on 24 June 2017. The Club Life program continued to air on Electric Area before it rebranded as Diplo's Revolution.

On 26 December 2025, Club Life ended with a compilation of EDM tracks from the past 20 years. The following Friday, Tiesto began a new radio show called Prismatic following his re-entry into the trance scene.

== Regular features ==
=== Club Life (old format) ===
- Tiësto's Classic: Tiësto selects a track that he feels is notable within the world of Trance.
- 15 Minutes of Fame: Included in the second hour, Tiësto gives an upcoming DJ the opportunity to have their '15 minutes of fame'.

=== Club Life (new format) ===
Implemented in May 2015:

- Club Life Exclusive: New upcoming tracks played for the first time in Club Life.
- Club Life Request: Tiësto selects a track requested by the fans using the hashtag #ClublifeRequest on Twitter.
- Hot From the Studio: Tiësto select a track that he feels is awesome.
- Mash-up of the Week: Mash-up track taken from the different musical platforms or the mailbox.
- Tiësto's Classic: Tiësto selects a classic track that he feels is notable within the world of electronic dance music.
- Guest Mix: Mixes created by other DJs in the last 15 minutes of the first hour of Club Life.
- Takeover: Deep & Tech House mixes from another DJ's during 30 min or all the time in the second hour of Club Life.

Changed in July 2019:

- 2nd Hour: Removed; now the show is one hour only.
- Tiësto's Classic: Removed.
- Guest Mix: Intermittently included rather than being a regular fixture.

== Move to 3FM and back ==
In April 2011, the show moved from Radio 538 to 3FM. On 1 May 2015, the show returned to Radio 538.

== Special episodes ==
=== 2025 ===
- Episode 978: 30 Music Hits from 2007-2025 "END OF CLUBLIFE ERA"
- Episode 977: Top 20 Most Supported Tracks Of 2025
- Episode 976: Afterhours End Of The Year 2025 Mix
- Episode 974: Tiësto Recorded Live @ The Dream Stage (Trance Set), Dreamstate SoCal, Queen Mary Waterfront, United States 2025-11-22
- Episode 973: Special Episode 'Tiësto Trance DJ Mix'
- Episode 931: Tiësto Recorded Live @ Zamna Tulum, Mexico 2025-01-08 (Part 2)
- Episode 930: Tiësto Recorded Live @ Zamna Tulum, Mexico 2025-01-08 (Part 1)
- Episode 929: AFTR:HRS Yearmix 2024 Hosted by VER:WEST
- Episode 928: Musical Freedom Yearmix 2024
- Episode 927: Top 20 Most Supported Tracks Of 2024

=== 2024 ===
- Episode 926: Best of Tiësto 2024
- Episode 925: Tiësto Recorded Live @ PRISMATIC, Forest Hills Stadium New York, United States 2024-10-25 (Part 4)
- Episode 924: Tiësto Recorded Live @ PRISMATIC, Forest Hills Stadium New York, United States 2024-10-25 (Part 3)
- Episode 923: Tiësto Recorded Live @ PRISMATIC, Forest Hills Stadium New York, United States 2024-10-25 (Part 2)
- Episode 922: Tiësto Recorded Live @ PRISMATIC, Forest Hills Stadium New York, United States 2024-10-25 (Part 1)
- Episode 909: Afterhours Special
- Episode 906: Tiësto Recorded Live @ Mainstage, Tomorrowland Weekend 2, Belgium 2024-07-28
- Episode 904: Tiësto Recorded Live @ Futur Stage, Kappa FuturFestival Turin, Italy 2024-07-05
- Episode 895: Tiësto Recorded Live @ kineticFIELD, Electric Daisy Carnival Las Vegas, United States 2024-05-18
- Episode 887: Tiësto Recorded Live @ Mainstage, Ultra Music Festival Miami, United States 2024-03-22
- Episode 875: Most Supported Tracks Of 2023

=== 2023 ===
- Episode 874: The Best Of 2023 'Tiësto Mix'
- Episode 873: Musical Freedom Yearmix 2023
- Episode 872: AFTR:HRS Yearmix Hosted by VER:WEST
- Episode 838: Special Tiësto presents his new studio album "DRIVE"

=== 2022 ===
- Episode 822: Most Supported Tracks Of 2022
- Episode 821: Musical Freedom Yearmix
- Episode 820: Best of AFTR:HRS 2022
- Episode 819: Best of Tiësto 2022
- Episode 812: Special for Amsterdam Dance Event 2022
- Episode 811: Afterhours Special
- Episode 800: Tiësto Recorded Live @ Tomorrowland Weekend 2, Belgium 2022-07-23
- Episode 799: Top 20 Summer Hits
- Episode 780: Afterhours Special
- Episode 771: Most Supported Tracks Of 2021
- Episode 770: Best of Tiësto 2021

=== 2021 ===
- Episode 769: Musical Freedom Yearmix 2021
- Episode 768: Tiësto Recorded Live @ EDC Las Vegas, United States 2021-10-23
- Episode 767: AFTR:HRS Hosted by VER:WEST
- Episode 750: Top 50 Tracks selected by the Tiësto fans
- Episode 746: VER:WEST live from Factory 93
- Episode 719: Mixed by VER:WEST
- Episode 718: Best of Musical Freedom 2020 Part 2

=== 2020 ===
- Episode 717: Best of Tiësto 2020
- Episode 716: Most Supported Tracks of 2020
- Episode 700: DJs & Friends selected their favorite song played in CLUBLIFE ever
- Episode 696: Tomorrowland Around The World 2020: VER:WEST (DJ Mix)
- Episode 693: AFTR:HRS Special
- Episode 692: Stadium Anthems
- Episode 685: The London Sessions Special
- Episode 683: AFTR:HRS Special
- Episode 679: AFTR:HRS Special

=== 2019 ===
- Episode 665: Most Supported Tracks of 2019
- Episode 664: mint 'Best Dance of the 2010s'
- Episode 663: Best of AFTR:HRS 2019
- Episode 655: Musical Freedom 10th Years Anniversary Special
- Episode 654: Tiësto Tracks & Remixes 2019 Special
- Episode 653: Summer Hits 2019 Special
- Episode 652: Tiësto @ Stellar Stage, Moonrise Festival, United States 2019-08-11
- Episode 650: Tiësto @ Mainstage, Tomorrowland, Belgium 2019-07-19
- Episode 640: Special Episode

=== 2018 ===
- Episode 613: Best Songs of 2018
- Episode 612: Best Remixes 2018
- Episode 611: Best Afterhours 2018
- Episode 610: Best of MF and AFTR:HRS 2018
- Episode 600: Top 60 CLUBLIFE tracks of all time (Selected by the Fans)
- Episode 594: Tiësto @ Mainstage, Untold Festival, Romania 2018-08-03
- Episode 592: Tiësto @ Mainstage, Tomorrowland, Belgium 2018-07-27
- Episode 578: Tribute To Avicii

=== 2017 ===
- Episode 561: The Best Songs of 2017
- Episode 560: AFTR:HRS Special
- Episode 559: Musical Freedom Yearmix
- Episode 550: CLUBLIFE vol. 5
- Episode 519: Musical Freedom 200th Releases

=== 2016 ===
- Episode 509: The Best Songs of 2016
- Episode 508: AFTR:HRS Special
- Episode 500: Tiësto @ Live From ZiggoDome, Amsterdam, the Netherlands (21-10-2016)

=== 2015 ===
- Episode 456: The Best Songs of 2015
- Episode 441: Tiesto & Stadiumx
- Episode 440: Tiësto & Justin Prime
- Episode 439: Tiësto & Sick Individuals
- Episode 438: Tiësto & Cazzette
- Episode 437: Tiësto & Ummet Ozcan
- Episode 436: Tiësto & VICE & Ferreck Dawn
- Episode 435: Tiësto & The Chainsmokers
- Episode 434: Tiësto & Robin Schulz
- Episode 433: Tiësto & Laidback Luke & Mike Mago
- Episode 432: Tiësto & Nervo
- Episode 431: Tiësto & Vicentone
- Episode 430: Tiësto & BURNS
- Episode 429: Tiësto & Dannic & Eelke Kleijn
- Episode 428: Tiësto & Don Diablo
- Episode 427: Tiësto & Afrojack
- Episode 426: Tiësto & Dimitri Vangelis & Wyman
- Episode 425: Tiësto & Hook N Sling & Bakermat
- Episode 424: Tiësto & R3hab
- Episode 423: Tiësto & W&W
- Episode 422: Tiësto & Avicii & Oliver Heldens
- Episode 421: Tiësto & ZAXX
- Episode 420: Tiësto & Tigerlily
- Episode 419: Tiësto & Moti
- Episode 418: Tiësto & Dzeko & Torres
- Episode 416: Tiësto & Disco Fries
- Episode 412: Tiësto & Luca Guerrieri
- Episode 410: Tiësto & Dirty Vegas
- Episode 405: Special A Town Called Paradise and Tiësto Remixes of The Year 2015

=== 2014 ===
- Episode 404: After Hours Special
- Episode 401: Tiësto & HELENA
- Episode 400: 400th Episode Special (4 Hour Show)
- Episode 396: Tiësto & Seven Lions
- Episode 394: Deephouse Special
- Episode 391: 90's Special Mix
- Episode 389: Tiësto & Tigerlily
- Episode 388: Afterhours Special
- Episode 384: Tiësto & Oliver Heldens
- Episode 383: Tiësto & Francesco Rossi
- Episode 365: Tiësto & The Chainsmokers
- Episode 360: Tiësto & Flosstradamus
- Episode 358: Best of 2000-2010
- Episode 357: After Hours Special
- Episode 354: Jeremy Olander Guestmix (Hour 2)

=== 2013 ===
- Episode 352: Best Tracks of 2013
- Episode 351: Musical Freedom Special
- Episode 350: Tiësto & Eelke Kleijn
- Episode 345: twoloud Guest Mix
- Episode 344: After Hours Special
- Episode 341: Moti Guest Mix
- Episode 339: Stefan Biniak Guest Mix
- Episode 338: Club Life 90's Special
- Episode 337: Delayers Guest Mix
- Episode 333: Nari & Milani Guest Mix
- Episode 331: Club Life After Hours Special
- Episode 326: Bass King Vs. X-Vertigo Guestmix (Hour 2)
- Episode 325: Special Tribute Club Life Vol. 1,2,3
- Episode 317: Alvaro Guestmix (Hour 2)
- Episode 314: Dimitri Vegas & Like Mike Guestmix (Hour 2)
- Episode 310: Special Dyro
- Episode 305: HMH Special
- Episode 304: Sandro Silva Live Guestmix (Hour 2)
- Episode 303: Jordy Dazz Live Heineken (Hour 2)
- Episode 302: Dannic Guestmix (Hour 2)
- Episode 301: Firebeatz Live Guestmix (Hour 2)

=== 2012 ===
- Episode 300: Favourite Tracks of the year. (last episode of 2012)
- Episode 291: Halloween Special
- Episode 287: Ibiza 2012 Special
- Episode 275: Presented by Hardwell
- Episode 261: Miami Special
- Episode 257: Swedish Invasion Special. (Tiësto focuses on the music, people, DJs and producers of Sweden)
- Episode 253: Las Vegas Special

=== 2011 ===
- Episode 247: Favourite 10 Tracks of the year. (last episode of 2011)
- Episode 240: The end of the College Invasion Tour. (some of the fans talking about the gigs throughout the episode)
- Episodes 212,213 and 214: Announcing Club Life: Volume One Las Vegas. (at the beginning)
- Episode 200 Tiësto Club Life.

=== 2010 ===
- Episode 195: Special Club Life Best 24 Track's of 2010
- Episode 144: Fan's Favorite Tracks of 2009
- Episode 145: DJ Scott William's Best tracks of 2009

=== 2009 ===
- Episode 129: 2 Hour Creamfields Daresbury UK 04-09-2009
- Episode 121: 1 Hour Ibiza Residency
- Episode 119: Tiësto feat. Sneaky Sound System – I Will Be Here (World premiere)
- Episode 111: 1 Hour Queensday Museumplein Amsterdam NL 30-04-2009
- Episode 100: Your Favourite Tracks 100th episode Club Life

=== 2008 ===
- Episode 091: Best of 2008
- Episode 084: Black Hole Recordings Special
- Episode 083: 1 Hour Privilege Ibiza closing party special Part 2
- Episode 082: 1 Hour Privilege Ibiza closing party special
- Episode 079: 1 Hour Mysteryland Special Part 2
- Episode 078: 1 Hour Mysteryland Special
- Episode 063: In Search of Sunrise Series Special Part 2
- Episode 062: In Search of Sunrise Series Special

=== 2007 ===
- Episode 039: End of the Year Mix
- Episode 023: In Search of Sunrise Series Special
- Episode 017: First hour from Live @ Expo Center – Kiev, Ukraine 23-06-2007
- Episode 013: First hour from Live @ The Point – Dublin, Ireland 16-06-2007
- Episode 008: First hour from Tiësto Live @ King's Hall Belfast 31-03-2007
- Episode 004: First hour from Tiësto Live @ EOL Alexandra Palace London, UK 20-04-2007

== Awards ==
- 2009 IDMA Awards Miami: Best Podcast
- 2010 IDMA Awards Miami: Best Radio Show
