= In the Dark (Tiësto song) =

Single by Tiësto featuring Christian Burns

from the album Elements of Life
- Released: March 2007
- Recorded: 2007
- Genre: Progressive trance; electro rock
- Length: 3:54 (Radio Edit)
- Label: Magik Muzik; Black Hole; Ultra
- Songwriter(s): Tijs Verwest; Dennis Waakop Reijers; Christian Burns
- Producer(s): Tiësto; DJ Waakop Reijers

Tiësto singles chronology
"He's a Pirate" (2006)	"In the Dark" (2007)	"Break My Fall" (2007)

Christian Burns singles chronology
"Everybody Wants To Rule the World" (2005)	"In the Dark" (2007)	"Something About You" (2008)

"In the Dark" is a song recorded by DJ Tiësto with vocals from Christian Burns released in March 2007. This song is off the album Elements of Life. The song was composed by Christian Burns, Tiësto and D.J. Waakop Reijers-Fraaij.

== Formats and track listings ==
=== CD, Maxi ===
CD, Maxi, File, MP3 (Magik Muzik, Central Station, Ultra Records/March, June 26, 2007/Netherlands, Australia, US)
No.	Title	Length
1.	"In The Dark (Radio Edit)"	3:54
2.	"In The Dark (Tiësto's Trance Mix)"	8:25
3.	"In The Dark (Dirty South Remix)"	7:50
4.	"In The Dark (Carl B. Remix)"	8:05

CD, Maxi (Nebula/2007/UK)
No.	Title	Length
1.	"In The Dark (Radio Edit)"	3:54
2.	"In The Dark (Original Mix)"	4:36
3.	"In The Dark (Tiësto's Trance Mix)"	8:28
4.	"In The Dark (Dirty South Remix)"	7:48
5.	"In The Dark (Carl B. Remix)"	8:05

CD, Maxi, Enhanced (Ultra Records, Nebula, Edel Distribution GmbH, Kontor Records/June 2007/US, UK, Germany)
No.	Title	Length
1.	"In The Dark (Radio Edit)"	3:53
2.	"In The Dark (Tiësto's Trance Mix)"	8:25
3.	"In The Dark (Dirty South Remix)"	7:48
4.	"In The Dark (Carl B. Remix)"	8:07
5.	"In The Dark (Video)"	3:52

=== 12" Vinyl ===
12" Vinyl (Magik Muzik/March, 2007/Netherlands)
No.	Title	Length
1.	"In The Dark (Radio Edit)"	3:54
2.	"In The Dark (Tiësto's Trance Mix)"	8:25

12" Vinyl (Magik Muzik, Kontor Records, Nebula/April 6, 2007/Netherlands, Germany, UK)
No.	Title	Length
1.	"In The Dark (Tiësto's Trance Mix)"	8:25
2.	"In The Dark (Dirty South Remix)"	7:48

12" Vinyl (S2 Records/May 2007/Switzerland)
No.	Title	Length
1.	"In The Dark (Carl B. Remix)"	8:07
2.	"In The Dark (Dirty South Remix)"	7:48

=== Promo ===
CDr, Maxi, Promo (Nebula/2007/UK)
No.	Title	Length
1.	"In The Dark (Radio Edit)"	3:54
2.	"In The Dark (Album Version)"	7:48
3.	"In The Dark (Instrumental)"	4:34

== Release history ==
Region	Date
Netherlands	March 2007
United States	June 2007

== Charts ==
=== Weekly charts ===
Chart (2007)	Peak position
Belgium (Ultratop 50 Flanders)	27
Belgium (Ultratip Bubbling Under Wallonia)	14
Finland (Suomen virallinen lista)	2
Hungary (Dance Top 40)	16
Hungary (Single Top 40)	2
Netherlands (Dutch Top 40)	2
Netherlands (Single Top 100)	4
US Dance/Mix Show Airplay (Billboard)	12

=== Year-end charts ===
Chart (2007)	Position
Hungary (Dance Top 40)	69
Netherlands (Dutch Top 40)	22
Netherlands (Single Top 100)	46
