= Maxi Jazz =

British musician, rapper and singer (1957–2022)

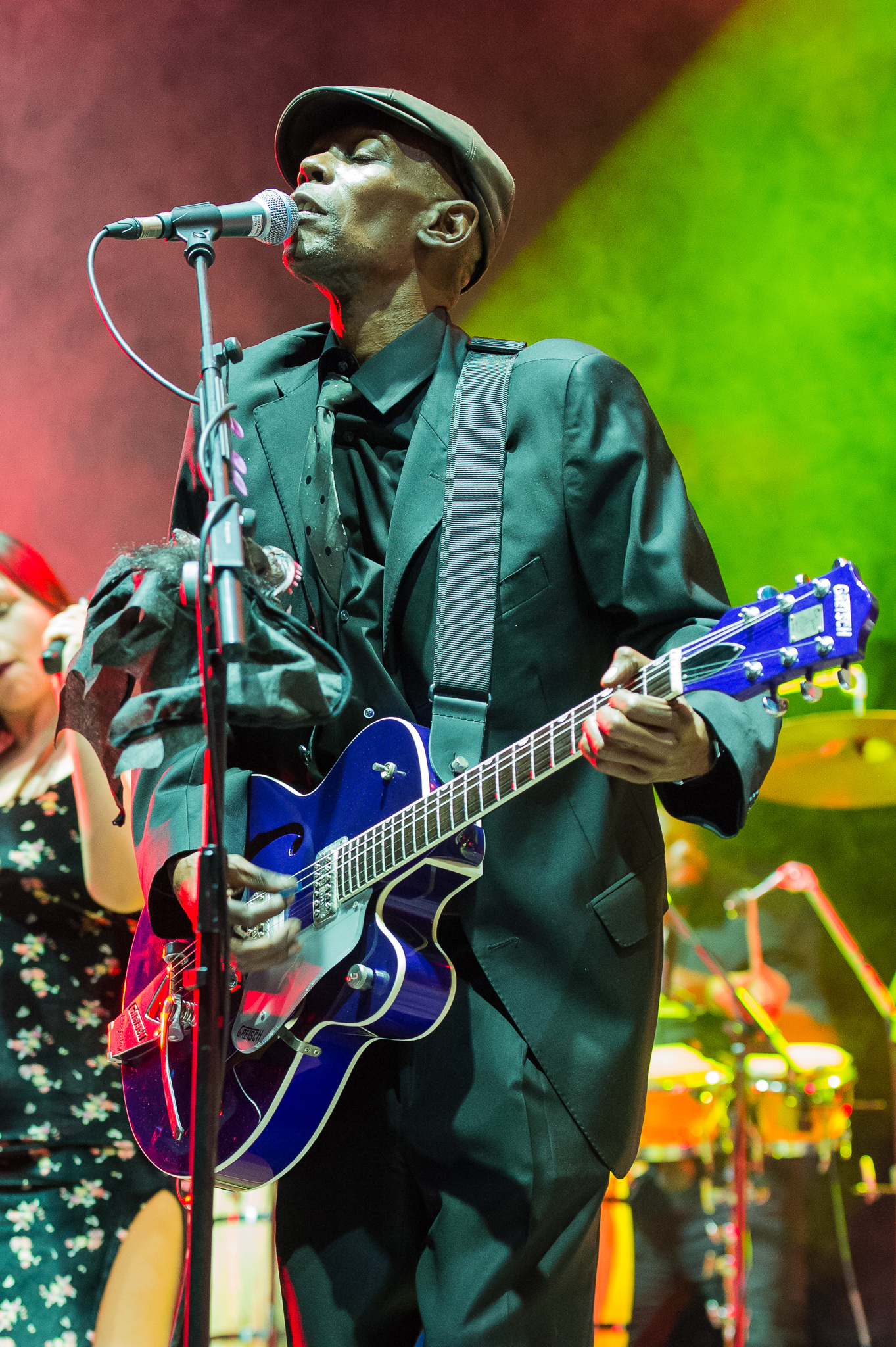
- Jazz at the Rock im Park 2015 festival

Background information
- Born: Maxwell Alexander Fraser; 14 June 1957; Hackney, London, England
- Died: 23 December 2022 (aged 65) London, England
- Genres: Electronic; trip hop; trance
- Occupations: Musician; rapper; singer; songwriter; DJ
- Years active: 1982–2022
- Labels: Cheeky; Columbia; Namu; Savage
- Formerly of: Faithless; Maxi Jazz and The E-Type Boys
- Website: maxi-jazz.com

Maxwell Alexander Fraser (14 June 1957 – 23 December 2022), better known by his stage name Maxi Jazz, was a British musician, rapper, singer, songwriter and DJ. He was the lead vocalist of British electronic band Faithless from 1995 to 2011 and 2015 to 2016.

== Music career ==
=== Hip hop beginnings ===
Maxi Jazz was born Maxwell Alexander Fraser on 14 June 1957 in Hackney, East London, and moved to Brixton, South London when he was a toddler. He founded the Soul Food Café System as a DJ in 1984, having discovered hip hop a year earlier. He first aired the sound as a DJ calling it "In the Soul Kitchen with DJ Maxi Jazz" on pirate radio station Reach FM London from 1985 to 1986. He transferred this sound to pirate radio station LWR in 1987.

In 1989, the Soul Food Café Band was picked up by Tam Tam Records, which is the dance wing of Savage Records. Jazz founded Namu Records in 1992 to release the band's material in the form of three EPs and the band toured as a support act to various artists, including Jamiroquai in Amsterdam, Soul II Soul in Barcelona, Galliano in Switzerland, and Jason Rebello in Brazil. In 1996, Maxi Jazz and the Soul Food Cafe recorded and released the album Original Groovejuice Vol. 1 with Revco Records in Deptford, South London. After the band dissolved, Jazz worked throughout Europe, and took time out to collaborate with Jah Wobble on the Invaders of the Heart album, followed by live dates with the Wobble Collective.

=== Faithless ===
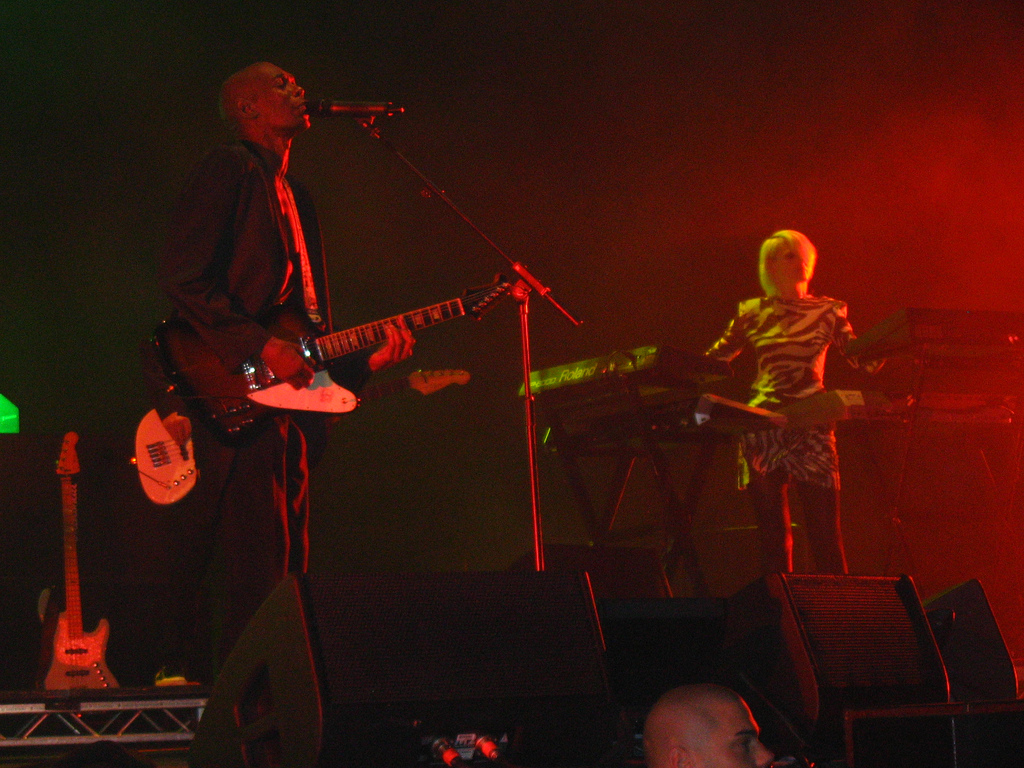
Jazz performing with Faithless in 2011

In 1995, Jazz met Rollo Armstrong in a studio and went on to form Faithless, together with Jamie Catto and Sister Bliss. Armstrong had asked Jazz to write and sing on a dance track about frustration, which was something to which Jazz could relate from his own experiences. The subject matter of Jazz's lyrics range from upbeat to melancholic. His work covered a range of personal and social issues, including current affairs and social commentary.

In 2006, Jazz provided the vocals for the hit Tiësto track "Dance4life". He also sang alongside Robbie Williams on the single "My Culture" from the collaborative album 1 Giant Leap.

In 2009, he raised £1,440,000 for the UK charity Comic Relief by singing non stop for 24 hours.

Jazz celebrated his 50th birthday on 15 June 2007 in Hyde Park, London, with Faithless headlining the O2 Wireless Festival that evening. In the encore, he was greeted by thousands of fans wishing him happy birthday.

He performed and recorded with Faithless from their founding in 1995 until 2011. He re-joined the group in 2015 and 2016 while they performed under the Faithless 2.0 banner. His final live appearance with the band was at Ibiza Rocks on 31 August 2016.

=== Maxi Jazz and the E-Type Boys ===
In 2015, he began fronting a newly assembled band of musicians named Maxi Jazz & the E-Type Boys. Jazz provided lead vocals and also played guitar in the band. They made a number of festival appearances, including some at the same events at which Faithless were billed.

=== Other ===
On 20 October 2018, he performed on stage as part of the Gatecrasher Classical event at Sheffield Arena, celebrating 25 years of the Gatecrasher brand.

In 2022, Jazz provided vocals on the Vintage Culture single "Commotion".

== Motor sports ==
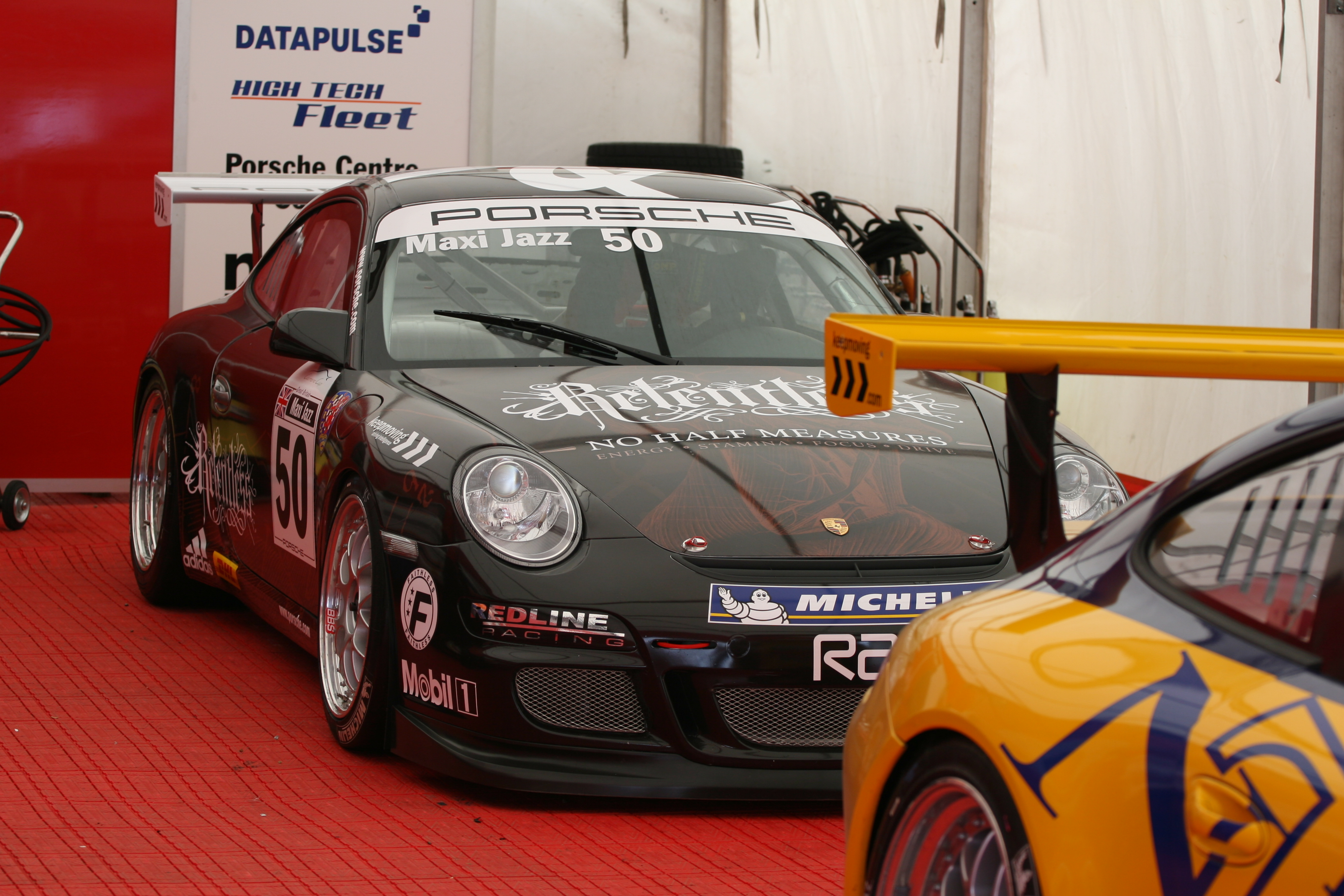
The Porsche 911 GT3 driven by Jazz

Jazz founded Maxi Jazz Racing in 2000 when he asked Rae Claydon to enter him in the Ford Fiesta Championship for the 2000 season, but was only able to race occasionally due to his musical obligations.

On 9 December 2001, Jazz was involved in a serious car crash causing several of Faithless's UK tour dates to be postponed. In 2005, he raced a Ginetta G20 in the Ginetta GT5 Challenge, and in 2006 and 2007, he raced in the Porsche Carrera Cup GB in a Porsche 997 GT3 Cup.

Jazz's notable car collection was featured on Sky One's Vroom Vroom motoring show. He owned a Subaru Impreza P1, a Ford Escort Mk2 RS2000, a Ford Fiesta Zetec S, a Ford Sierra Cosworth, and a Marcos LM500 R. He also owned a Nissan 350Z, which is referenced in the 2010 Faithless song "Flyin' Hi".

== Personal life ==
Jazz lived in West Norwood, in the London Borough of Lambeth. Jazz spent three years of his childhood living in Cape Town, South Africa where he attended Belmor Primary School in Hanover Park. A Soka Gakkai Buddhist, he advocated the work of the Burma Campaign UK.

A supporter of Crystal Palace F.C., in September 2012 he became an associate director of the club.

In 2011, a portrait of Jazz was painted by British artist Joe Simpson; the painting was exhibited around the UK, including in a solo exhibition at the Royal Albert Hall. The portrait was shortlisted for the 2011 BP Portrait Award and exhibited at The National Portrait Gallery.

== Death ==
Jazz died "peacefully in his sleep" at his home in South London, after a long illness, on 23 December 2022 at the age of 65. His funeral was held on 30 January 2023.

=== Tributes ===
Faithless shared their tribute, "He was a man who changed our lives in so many ways. He gave proper meaning and message to our music. He was also a lovely human being with time for everyone and a wisdom that was both profound and accessible. It was an honour and, of course, a true pleasure to work with him. He was a brilliant lyricist, a DJ, a Buddhist, a magnificent stage presence, car lover, endless talker, beautiful person, moral compass and genius." Dido, sister of Rollo and a regular collaborator with Faithless tweeted her tribute, "RIP Maxi. It was an absolute honour to know you, be inspired by you, listen to you and sing with you. Your voice and words will never leave my head."

On 28 May 2023, Crystal Palace supporters' group, the Holmesdale Fanatics, unveiled their tribute to Jazz, with a full stand tifo display of his face, the largest seen in English football, alongside lyrics from "God Is a DJ", reading "This is our church. This is where we heal our hurts".

== Discography ==
=== With 1 Giant Leap ===
- 2002 "My Culture" (with 1 Giant Leap and Robbie Williams)

=== With Soul Food Cafe ===
- 1991 "Through the Mirror / Standin' in My Dust" (with Soul Food Cafe)
- 1996 Original Groovejuice (with Soul Food Cafe)

=== With the E-Type Boys ===
- 2016 Bitter Love / Mass Destruction EP (as Maxi Jazz & the E-Type Boys)
- 2016 "Change Our Destiny" (as Maxi Jazz & the E-Type Boys)
- 2016 Simple..Not Easy (as Maxi Jazz & the E-Type Boys)

=== Solo ===
- 1989 "Rock to Dis" (with Jamaica Mean Time)
- 1990 "Do Your Dance"
- 1992 "Summertime" (with Jason Rebello)
- 1992 The Maxi-Single (More of What You Need)
- 1992 5 Track E.P.
- 1996 "Brixton (Baby)"
- 2006 "dance4life" (with Tiësto), No. 3 NL, No. 5 BEL, No. 10 FIN
- 2011 "Where the Heart Is" (with Benji Boko)
- 2012 "Tomorrow's Day" (with Trenton and Free Radical)
- 2014 "In My Brain" (with the Hempolics)
- 2022 "Commotion" (with Vintage Culture)
