= Tiësto discography =

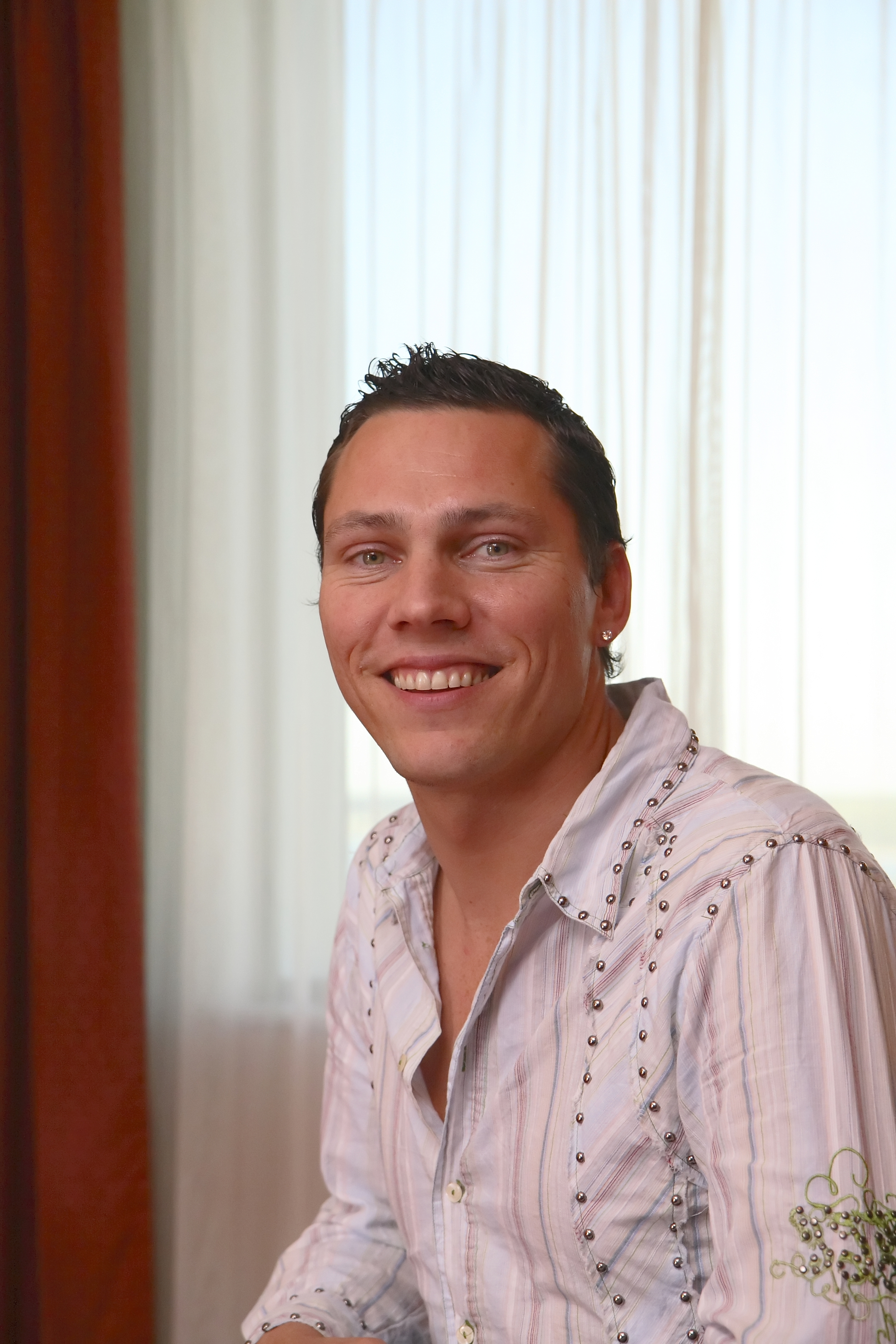
- Tiësto in Tallinn, 2007
- Studio albums: 7
- Extended plays: 2
- Compilation albums: 6
- Singles: 119
- Video albums: 5
- Remix albums: 4
- DJ mixes: 33
- Remixes: 124

Throughout his career, Dutch electronic DJ and producer Tiësto has released seven studio albums. After spending years searching for his personal style and working with DJs like Ferry Corsten (as Gouryella), Benno de Goeij (as Kamaya Painters) and Armin van Buuren (as Alibi and Major League), he decided it was time to focus on his solo work. Tiësto's fame started to rise in the late 1990s after his set at the first ID&T Innercity party (Live at Innercity: Amsterdam RAI), and it continued to skyrocket in the early 2000s following his six-hour "Tiësto Solo" sets, which he performed without any other DJs or opening acts. His last three full-length releases broke the 70,000-unit mark, and the 2003 DJ mix Nyana hit 87,000, according to Nielsen SoundScan in mid-2008.

In 1994, Tiësto began releasing material on Noculan Records' sub-labels Chemo and Coolman. Later that year he signed to Basic Beat Recordings, where he met Arny Bink. Tiësto released records on the sub-label Trashcan, founded by Bink, and created the sub-label Guardian Angel with Bink, where they introduced the popular Forbidden Paradise series. From 1995 to 1996 Tiësto released four extended plays on Bonzai Jumps and XTC, sub-labels of Lightning Records. In 1997, Tiësto joined his friend Yves Vandichel on his sub-label, DJ Yves, a division of the now defunct Human Resource label XSV Music. In the fall of 1997, both Bink and Tiësto decided to leave Basic Beat and create their own parent label, now known as Black Hole Recordings. Trashcan was discontinued and Guardian Angel continued releasing music until 2002. In 1998, Tiësto released the Magik series through Black Hole and created two major sub-labels, In Trance We Trust and SongBird. From 1998 to 1999, Tiësto released music on Planetary Consciousness. There he met A&R Hardy Heller and invited him to release records on Black Hole. Tiësto later included the In Search of Sunrise series on SongBird and opened a new division of Black Hole, Magik Muzik, in 2001, which is now the home of the major chart-topping songs by Tiësto. The sub-label released exclusive material but has expanded since then.

Tiësto's first studio album, In My Memory, produced four major hits: "Flight 643", "Obsession", "Lethal Industry", and "Suburban Train". After becoming the "No. 1 DJ in the world" according to DJMag for three consecutive years, he released his second studio album in 2004, Just Be. The album contained one number one hit, "Traffic", which was the first instrumental track to reach the top spot in his homeland the Netherlands in 23 years. The album also contained a new trance anthem, "Adagio for Strings", a remake of Samuel Barber's classical song "Adagio for Strings". Tiësto became the first DJ to perform live at the Olympic Games when he was asked to perform during the 2004 Summer Olympics Opening Ceremony. The set that he performed there was later condensed and released on CD as Parade of the Athletes. In 2007, Tiësto released his third studio album, Elements of Life, which moved 72,000 units in its April release according to Nielsen SoundScan. On October 6, 2009, Tiësto released his fourth studio album, Kaleidoscope. Unlike his earlier albums, which were all mostly trance, Kaleidoscope explores other electronic genres, and is considered Tiesto's most experimental album. On June 16, 2014, Tiësto released his fifth studio album, A Town Called Paradise. In 2020, he released his sixth studio album, The London Sessions, which was a collaborative album with multiple producers including Shaun Frank and Jonas Blue. On April 21, 2023, Tiësto released his seventh studio album, Drive.

== Albums ==
=== Studio albums ===
List of studio albums, with selected chart positions and certifications
| Title | Details | Peak chart positions | | | | | | | | | | Certifications (sales thresholds) |
| Title | Details | NLD | AUS | BEL | CAN | GER | IRE | NOR | SWI | UK | US | Certifications (sales thresholds) |
|---|---|---|---|---|---|---|---|---|---|---|---|---|
| In My Memory | Released: 15 April 2001; Labels: Magik Muzik, Black Hole, Nettwerk; Formats: CD, 12" | 25 | — | — | — | — | — | — | — | — | — | NVPI: Gold |
| Just Be | Released: 6 April 2004; Labels: Magik Muzik, Black Hole, Nettwerk; Formats: CD, 12" | 1 | 201 | 2 | — | 51 | — | — | — | 54 | — | NVPI: Gold; BPI: Silver |
| Elements of Life | Released: 16 April 2007; Labels: Magik Muzik, Black Hole, Ultra; Formats: Digital download, CD, 12" | 1 | 161 | 3 | 24 | 62 | 5 | 26 | 77 | 14 | 71 | NVPI: Gold; BPI: Silver; MC: Gold |
| Kaleidoscope | Released: 6 October 2009; Labels: Musical Freedom, PIAS, Ultra; Formats: Digital download, CD, 12" | 2 | 31 | 9 | 6 | 61 | 5 | 29 | 73 | 20 | 59 | MC: Gold |
| Kiss from the Past (as Allure) | Released: 13 June 2011; Labels: Magik Muzik, Black Hole; Formats: Digital download, CD, 12" | — | — | — | — | — | — | — | — | — | — | |
| A Town Called Paradise | Released: 16 June 2014; Labels: Musical Freedom, PM:AM Recordings, Casablanca, Republic, Universal Music; Formats: Digital download, CD | 11 | 18 | 15 | 6 | 45 | 22 | 14 | 12 | 22 | 18 | |
| The London Sessions | Released: 15 May 2020; Labels: Musical Freedom, PM:AM Recordings, Universal Music; Formats: Digital download, CD | 54 | — | — | — | — | 75 | — | — | 64 | — | BPI: Silver |
| Drive | Released: 21 April 2023; Labels: Musical Freedom, Atlantic; Formats: Digital download, CD | 36 | 26 | 40 | 12 | 38 | 19 | 6 | 19 | 34 | 87 | BPI: Gold; MC: 2× Platinum; RIAA: Gold |
"—" denotes an album that did not chart or was not released.

=== Compilation albums ===
List of compilation albums, with selected chart positions and certifications
| Title | Details | Peak chart positions | | | | | | | | | | Certifications (sales thresholds) |
| Title | Details | NLD | AUS | AUT | BEL | CAN | DEN | GER | IRE | NOR | UK | Certifications (sales thresholds) |
|---|---|---|---|---|---|---|---|---|---|---|---|---|
| Parade of the Athletes | Released: 7 September 2004; Labels: Black Hole Recordings; Formats: Digital download, CD | 4 | — | — | 18 | — | — | 85 | — | — | — | NVPI: Gold; BPI: Silver |
| Perfect Remixes Vol. 3 | Released: 22 February 2005; Labels: Warlock Records; Formats: Digital download, CD | — | — | — | — | — | — | — | — | — | — | |
| Best of System F & Gouryella (Part 1) | Released: 4 July 2005; Labels: Flashover Recordings; Formats: Digital download, CD | — | — | — | — | — | — | — | — | — | — | |
| Best of System F & Gouryella (Part 2) | Released: 1 May 2006; Labels: Flashover Recordings; Formats: Digital download, CD | — | — | — | — | — | — | — | — | — | — | |
| Kamaya Painters: The Collected Works | Released: 21 April 2008; Labels: Black Hole Recordings; Formats: Digital download, CD | — | — | — | — | — | — | — | — | — | — | |
| Magikal Journey | Released: 17 May 2010; Labels: Magik Muzik; Formats: Digital download, CD | 11 | 168 | 39 | 2 | 11 | 31 | 58 | 7 | 15 | 27 | BPI: Silver |
"—" denotes an album that did not chart or was not released.

=== Remix albums ===
List of remix albums, with selected chart positions
| Title | Details | Peak chart positions | | | | | |
| Title | Details | NLD | AUS | BEL | DEN | IRE | UK |
|---|---|---|---|---|---|---|---|
| Just Be: Remixed | Released: 26 September 2005; Labels: Songbird, Magik Muzik; Formats: Digital download, CD | — | — | — | — | — | — |
| Gold Remixes | Released: 1 December 2007; Labels: Magik Muzik; Formats: Digital download, CD | — | — | — | — | — | — |
| Elements of Life: Remixed | Released: 28 April 2008; Labels: Magik Muzik; Formats: Digital download, CD | 61 | 171 | — | — | 37 | 61 |
| Kaleidoscope: Remixed | Released: 31 August 2010; Labels: Ultra Records; Formats: Digital download, CD | 37 | 110 | 11 | 37 | — | — |
| Kiss from the Past: The Remix Album (as Allure) | Released: 25 February 2013; Labels: Magik Muzik; Formats: Digital download, CD | — | — | — | — | — | — |
"—" denotes an album that did not chart or was not released.

== Extended plays ==
List of extended plays
| Title | Details |
|---|---|
| I Like It Loud | Released: 30 March 2018; Labels: Musical Freedom; Formats: Digital download, CD |
| Together | Released: 5 April 2019; Labels: Musical Freedom; Formats: Digital download |
| Together Again | Released: 15 October 2021; Labels: Musical Freedom; Formats: Digital download |
| Cool n Calm EP | Released: 4 April 2025; Labels: Musical Freedom; Formats: Digital download |

== Video albums ==
List of video albums, with selected chart positions and certifications
| Title | Details | Chart positions | | | Certification |
| Title | Details | NLD | AUS | GER | Certification |
|---|---|---|---|---|---|
| Live at Innercity: Amsterdam RAI | Released: 1999; Location: Innercity, Amsterdam, the Netherlands | 71 | — | — | |
| Another Day at the Office | Released: 2003; Director: Stan Gordijn; Location: Breda, The Netherlands | — | — | — | |
| Tiësto in Concert | Released: 27 January 2004; Director: Peter van Eijndt; Location: Gelredome - Arnhem, The Netherlands | — | — | — | NVPI: Gold |
| Tiësto in Concert 2 | Released: 15 February 2005; Directors: Guus Albregts, Jeroen Jansen; Location: Gelredome - Arnhem, The Netherlands | — | — | — | NVPI: Gold; MC: Gold |
| Copenhagen: Elements of Life World Tour | Released: 29 February 2008; Director: Guus Albregts; Location: Parken Stadium - Copenhagen, Denmark | — | 8 | 40 | ARIA: Gold; BVMI: Gold; IFPI DEN: Gold; MC: Gold |
"—" denotes an album that did not chart or was not released.

== DJ mixes ==
This list contains DJ mixes produced by Tiësto.

From 1990s
| Year | Title |
|---|---|
| 1995 | Forbidden Paradise 3: The Quest for Atlantis |
| 1995 | Forbidden Paradise 4: High as a Kite |
| 1996 | Forbidden Paradise 5: Arctic Expedition |
| 1996 | Lost Treasures: Isle of Ra |
| 1996 | Lost Treasures: Concerto for Sonic Circles |
| 1996 | Forbidden Paradise 6: Valley of Fire |
| 1997 | Magik One: First Flight |
| 1997 | Lost Treasures: Creatures of the Deep |
| 1998 | Forbidden Paradise 7: Deep Forest |
| 1998 | Global Clubbing: The Netherlands |
| 1998 | Space Age 1.0 |
| 1998 | Magik Two: Story of the Fall |
| 1998 | Magik Three: Far from Earth |
| 1999 | Space Age 2.0 |
| 1999 | Live at Innercity: Amsterdam RAI |
| 1999 | Magik Four: A New Adventure |
| 1999 | In Search of Sunrise |

From 2000s
| Year | Title |
|---|---|
| 2000 | Magik Five: Heaven Beyond |
| 2000 | Magik Six: Live in Amsterdam |
| 2000 | Summerbreeze |
| 2000 | In Search of Sunrise 2 |
| 2001 | Revolution |
| 2001 | Magik Seven: Live in Los Angeles |
| 2002 | In Search of Sunrise 3: Panama |
| 2003 | Nyana (Gold Certification — NVPI (2004) ) |
| 2005 | In Search of Sunrise 4: Latin America (Gold Certification — NVPI (2005) ) |
| 2006 | In Search of Sunrise 5: Los Angeles (Gold Certification — CRIA (2007)) |
| 2007 | In Search of Sunrise 6: Ibiza (Gold Certification — CRIA (2008), IRMA ) |
| 2008 | In Search of Sunrise 7: Asia (Gold Certification — CRIA (2009) ) |

From 2010s
| Year | Title |
|---|---|
| 2011 | Club Life: Volume One Las Vegas |
| 2012 | Club Life: Volume Two Miami |
| 2012 | Dance (RED) Save Lives |
| 2013 | Club Life: Volume Three Stockholm |
| 2015 | Club Life: Volume Four New York City |
| 2016 | AFTR:HRS (Mixed By Tiësto) |
| 2017 | Club Life: Vol. Five - China |

== Singles ==
=== As lead artist ===
List of singles, with selected chart positions and certifications, showing year released and album name
| Title | Year | Peak chart positions | | | | | | | | | | Certifications | Album |
| Title | Year | NLD | AUT | BEL | CAN | GER | IRE | SWE | UK | US | US Dance | Certifications | Album |
|---|---|---|---|---|---|---|---|---|---|---|---|---|---|
| "Trip to Heaven" (as T Scanner) | 1993 | — | — | — | — | — | — | — | — | — | — | | Non-album singles |
| "Spiritual Wipe Out" (as Da Joker) | 1994 | — | — | — | — | — | — | — | — | — | — | | Non-album singles |
| "Arabsession" (as DJ Limited) | 1994 | — | — | — | — | — | — | — | — | — | — | | Non-album singles |
| "In the Ghetto" (as Da Joker) | 1995 | — | — | — | — | — | — | — | — | — | — | | Non-album singles |
| "The Tube" | 1996 | — | — | — | — | — | — | — | — | — | — | | Lost Treasures: Creatures of the Deep |
| "Second Game" (as Tom Ace) | 1996 | — | — | — | — | — | — | — | — | — | — | | Bonzai Jumps - Retrospective 1996/1998 |
| "Gimme Some Sugar" / "Bleckentrommel" (with Montana & Storm) | 1997 | — | — | — | — | — | — | — | — | — | — | | Space Age 1.0 |
| "Blackspin" (as Passenger) | 1997 | — | — | — | — | — | — | — | — | — | — | | Non-album single |
| "Endless Wave" / "Northern Spirit" / "Outstream" (with Benno De Goeij as Kamaya Painters) | 1998 | — | — | — | — | — | — | — | — | — | — | | Global Clubbing: The Netherlands |
| "When She Left" (as Allure) | 1998 | — | — | — | — | — | — | — | — | — | — | | Magik One: First Flight |
| "Subspace Interference" (with Benno De Goeij as Control Freaks) | 1998 | — | — | — | — | — | — | — | — | — | — | | Magik Two: Story of the Fall |
| "Gouryella" (with Ferry Corsten as Gouryella) | 1999 | — | — | — | — | — | — | — | 15 | — | — | | Best of System F & Gouryella (Part 1) |
| "Theme from Norefjell" | 1999 | — | — | — | — | — | — | — | 97 | — | — | | Magik Three: Far from Earth |
| "Mirror" (as Stray Dog) | 1999 | — | — | — | — | — | — | — | — | — | — | | Live At Innercity - Amsterdam RAI |
| "Walhalla" (with Ferry Corsten as Gouryella) | 1999 | 35 | — | — | — | — | — | — | 27 | — | — | | Best of System F & Gouryella (Part 1) |
| "Far from Over" / "Cryptomnesia" / "Soft Light" (with Benno De Goeij as Kamaya Painters) | 1999 | — | — | — | — | — | — | — | — | — | — | | In Search of Sunrise |
| "Exceptionally Beautiful" / "Reflections" (as Loop Control) | 1999 | — | — | — | — | — | — | — | — | — | — | | Magik Four: A New Adventure |
| "Sparkles" | 1999 | — | — | — | — | — | — | — | 88 | — | — | | Magik Four: A New Adventure |
| "We Ran at Dawn" (as Allure) | 2000 | — | — | — | — | — | — | — | — | — | — | | Magik Four: A New Adventure |
| "Tenshi" (with Ferry Corsten as Gouryella) | 2000 | — | — | — | — | — | — | — | 45 | — | — | | Best of System F & Gouryella (Part 2) |
| "No More Tears" (as Allure) | 2000 | — | — | — | — | — | — | — | — | — | — | | Magik Five: Heaven Beyond |
| "Eternity" (with Armin van Buuren as Alibi) | 2000 | 93 | — | — | — | — | — | — | — | — | — | | Magik Five: Heaven Beyond |
| "Wasteland" / "Summerbreeze" (with Benno De Goeij as Kamaya Painters) | 2000 | — | — | — | — | — | — | — | — | — | — | | Magik Six: Live in Amsterdam |
| "Wonder Where You Are" (with Armin van Buuren as Major League) | 2000 | — | — | — | — | — | — | — | — | — | — | | Summerbreeze |
| "Lethal Industry" | 2001 | 6 | — | 15 | — | 95 | 36 | — | 25 | — | — | | In My Memory |
| "Suburban Train" / "Urban Train" | 2001 | 43 | — | — | — | 88 | — | — | 22 | — | — (Note: "Suburban Train" did not enter the US Hot Dance/Electronic Songs chart but peaked at number 23 on the Dance Club Songs chart.) | | In My Memory |
| "Flight 643" | 2001 | 7 | — | — | — | 88 | — | — | 56 | — | — (Note: "Flight 643" did not enter the US Hot Dance/Electronic Songs chart but peaked at number 48 on the Dance Club Songs chart.) | | In My Memory |
| "643 (Love's on Fire)" (featuring Suzanne Palmer) | 2002 | 55 | — | 50 | — | — | — | — | 36 | — | — | | In My Memory |
| "Obsession" (with Junkie XL) | 2002 | — | — | — | — | — | — | — | 56 | — | — | | In My Memory |
| "In My Memory" (featuring Nicola Hitchcock) | 2002 | — | — | — | 15 | — | — | — | — | — | 12 | | In My Memory |
| "Traffic" | 2003 | 1 | — | 3 | — | — | — | — | 48 | — | — (Note: "Traffic" did not enter the US Hot Dance/Electronic Songs chart but peaked at number 21 on the Dance/Mix Show Airplay chart.) | | Just Be |
| "Love Comes Again" (featuring BT) | 2004 | 4 | — | 6 | — | 64 | — | — | 30 | — | 32 | | Just Be |
| "Just Be" (featuring Kirsty Hawkshaw) | 2004 | 12 | — | 8 | — | — | — | — | 43 | — | — (Note: "Just Be" did not enter the US Hot Dance/Electronic Songs chart but peaked at number 20 on the Dance/Mix Show Airplay chart.) | | Just Be |
| "Adagio for Strings" | 2005 | — | 54 | — | — | 41 | 20 | — | 37 | — | — | BPI: Platinum | Just Be |
| "UR" / "A Tear in the Open" (featuring Matt Hales) | 2005 | — | — | — | — | — | — | — | — | — | — | | Just Be |
| "The Loves We Lost" (as Allure) | 2006 | — | — | — | — | — | 50 | — | 89 | — | — | | In Search of Sunrise 4: Latin America |
| "He's a Pirate" (Remixes) | 2006 | 5 | — | 10 | — | 85 | 24 | — | 90 | — | — | | Elements of Life |
| "Dance4life" (featuring Maxi Jazz) | 2006 | 4 | — | 5 | — | 74 | — | — | 67 | — | — | | Elements of Life |
| "In the Dark" (featuring Christian Burns) | 2007 | 2 | — | 27 | — | — | — | — | — | — | — (Note: "In the Dark" did not enter the US Hot Dance/Electronic Songs chart but peaked at number 12 on the Dance/Mix Show Airplay chart.) | | Elements of Life |
| "Break My Fall" (featuring BT) | 2007 | 13 | — | 59 | — | — | — | — | — | — | — | | Elements of Life |
| "Somewhere Inside" (as Allure featuring Julie Thompson) | 2008 | — | — | — | — | — | — | — | — | — | — | | In Search of Sunrise 6: Ibiza |
| "Tell Me" (as Clear View featuring Jessica) | 2008 | — | — | — | — | — | — | — | — | — | — | | In Search of Sunrise 6: Ibiza |
| "Power of You" (as Allure featuring Christian Burns) | 2008 | — | — | — | — | — | — | — | — | — | — | | In Search of Sunrise 7: Asia |
| "I Will Be Here" (with Sneaky Sound System) | 2009 | 33 | — | — | — | — | 29 | — | 44 | — | — (Note: "Suburban Train" did not enter the US Hot Dance/Electronic Songs chart but peaked at number one on the Dance/Mix Show Airplay chart.) | | Kaleidoscope |
| "Escape Me" (featuring C.C. Sheffield) | 2009 | 52 | — | — | — | — | — | — | — | — | — (Note: "Escape Me" did not enter the US Hot Dance/Electronic Songs chart but peaked at number six on the Dance/Mix Show Airplay chart.) | | Kaleidoscope |
| "Feel It" (vs. Three 6 Mafia with Sean Kingston and Flo Rida) | 2009 | 62 | 20 | — | 33 | 21 | 39 | — | 83 | 78 | – (Note: "Feel It" did not enter the US Hot Dance/Electronic Songs, but peaked at number seven on the Dance/Electronic Digital Song Sales component chart.) | MC: Gold | Non-album single |
| "Who Wants to Be Alone" (featuring Nelly Furtado) | 2010 | 34 | — | 39 | — | — | — | — | 91 | — | — (Note: "Who Wants to Be Alone" did not enter the US Hot Dance/Electronic Songs, but peaked at number 39 on the Dance/Electronic Digital Song Sales component chart.) | | Kaleidoscope |
| "Feel It in My Bones" (featuring Tegan & Sara) | 2010 | — | — | — | 29 | — | — | — | — | — | — (Note: "Feel It in My Bones" did not enter the US Hot Dance/Electronic Songs, but peaked at number 45 on the Dance/Electronic Digital Song Sales component chart.) | MC: Platinum | Kaleidoscope |
| "C'mon" (vs. Diplo) | 2010 | — | — | — | — | — | — | — | — | — | — | | Club Life, Vol. 1 - Las Vegas |
| "C'mon (Catch 'Em By Surprise)" (vs. Diplo featuring Busta Rhymes) | 2011 | 8 | — | 39 | 68 | 68 | 21 | — | 13 | — | – (Note: "C'mon (Catch 'Em By Surprise)" did not enter the US Hot Dance/Electronic Songs, but peaked at number 16 on the Dance/Electronic Digital Song Sales component chart.) | BPI: Silver | Club Life, Vol. 1 - Las Vegas |
| "Zero 76" (with Hardwell) | 2011 | 19 | — | 49 | — | — | — | — | — | — | — (Note: "Zero 76" did not enter the US Hot Dance/Electronic Songs, but peaked at number 32 on the Dance/Electronic Digital Song Sales component chart.) | | Club Life, Vol. 1 - Las Vegas |
| "Work Hard, Play Hard" (featuring Kay) | 2011 | — | — | — | 56 | — | — | — | — | — | — | | What's Next Exclusive Mix |
| "Maximal Crazy" | 2011 | — | — | 80 | — | — | — | — | — | — | — (Note: "Maximal Crazy" did not enter the US Hot Dance/Electronic Songs, but peaked at number 37 on the Dance/Electronic Digital Song Sales component chart.) | | Club Life, Vol. 2 - Miami |
| "What Can We Do (A Deeper Love)" | 2011 | — | — | — | — | — | — | — | — | — | — | | Club Life, Vol. 2 - Miami |
| "We Own the Night" (with Wolfgang Gartner featuring Luciana) | 2012 | 80 | — | 89 | — | — | — | — | 80 | — | — (Note: "We Own the Night" did not enter the US Hot Dance/Electronic Songs, but peaked at number 49 on the Dance/Electronic Digital Song Sales component chart.) | | Club Life, Vol. 2 - Miami |
| "Hell Yeah!" (with Showtek) | 2012 | — | — | — | — | — | — | — | — | — | — | | Non-album single |
| "Pair of Dice" (with Allure) | 2012 | — | — | — (Note: "Pair of Dice" did not chart on the Ultratop 50 Wallonia, but did peak at number 10 on the related Dance/Electronic Songs chart.) | — | — | — | — | — | — | — | | A Town Called Paradise |
| "United" (with Quintino and Alvaro) | 2013 | — | — | — | — | — | — | — | — | — | 36 | | Club Life, Vol. 3 - Stockholm |
| "Chasing Summers" | 2013 | — | — | – | — | — | — | — | — | — | 36 | | Club Life, Vol. 2 - Miami |
| "Take Me" (featuring Kyler England) | 2013 | — | — | 62 | — | — | — | — | — | — | 19 | | Club Life, Vol. 3 - Stockholm |
| "Paradise" (with Dyro) | 2013 | — | — | — | — | — | — | — | — | — | — | | Club Life, Vol. 3 - Stockholm |
| "Back to the Acid" (with MOTi) | 2013 | — | — | — | — | — | — | — | — | — | — | | Club Life, Vol. 3 - Stockholm |
| "Shocker" (with DJ Punish) | 2013 | — | — | — | — | — | — | — | — | — | — | | Club Life, Vol. 3 - Stockholm |
| "Love and Run" (with Mark Alston, Baggi Bergovic & Jason Taylor featuring Teddy Geiger) | 2013 | — | — | — | — | — | — | — | — | — | — | | Club Life, Vol. 3 - Stockholm |
| "Move to the Rhythm" (with Nari & Milani vs. Delayers) | 2013 | — | — | — | — | — | — | — | — | — | — | | Non-album singles |
| "Out of Control" (as TST with Alvaro) | 2013 | — | — | — | — | — | — | — | — | — | — | | Non-album singles |
| "Red Lights" | 2013 | 42 | 36 | 70 | 41 | 29 | 3 | 9 | 6 | 56 | 5 | BPI: Gold; GLF: Gold; IFPI DEN: Gold; MC: Gold; RIAA: Platinum | A Town Called Paradise |
| "Drop It Like This" (as TST with twoloud) | 2014 | — | — | — | — | — | — | — | — | — | — | | Non-album single |
| "Wasted" (featuring Matthew Koma) | 2014 | 15 | 21 | 55 | 37 | 49 | 13 | 5 | 3 | 49 | 5 | BPI: Platinum; IFPI DEN: Platinum; MC: Gold; RIAA: Platinum | A Town Called Paradise |
| "No Regular" (as TST with Dani L. Mebius) | 2014 | — | — | — | — | — | — | — | — | — | — | | Non-album single |
| "Let's Go" (featuring Icona Pop) | 2014 | — | — | — | — | — | — | — | — | — | 30 | | A Town Called Paradise |
| "Say Something" (featuring Emily Rowed) | 2014 | — | — | — | — | — | — | — | — | — | 20 | | A Town Called Paradise |
| "Real Life" (as TST with Moguai featuring Amba Shepherd) | 2014 | — | — | — | — | — | — | — | — | — | — | | Non-album single |
| "Light Years Away" (featuring DBX) | 2014 | — | — | 69 | — | — | — | — | — | — | 23 | | A Town Called Paradise |
| "Blow Your Mind" (with MOTi) | 2015 | — | — | — | — | — | — | — | — | — | — | | Non-album single |
| "Secrets" (with KSHMR featuring Vassy) | 2015 | 21 | 55 | 31 | 68 | — | — | 24 | — | — | 15 | BPI: Silver; RIAA: Gold | Club Life, Vol. 4 – New York City |
| "The Only Way Is Up" (with Martin Garrix) | 2015 | 74 | — | — | — | — | — | 81 | — | — | 41 | | Club Life, Vol. 4 – New York City |
| "Show Me" (with DallasK) | 2015 | — | — | — | — | — | — | — | — | — | — | | Club Life, Vol. 4 – New York City |
| "Change Your World" (with Jane Zhang) | 2015 | — | — | — | — | — | — | — | — | — | — | | Club Life, Vol. 4 – New York City |
| "Split (Only U)" (with The Chainsmokers) | 2015 | — | — | 63 | — | — | — | — | — | — | — (Note: "Split (only U)" did not enter the US Hot Dance/Electronic Songs, but peaked at number 19 on the Dance/Electronic Digital Song Sales component chart.) | | Collide soundtrack |
| "Chemicals" (with Don Diablo featuring Thomas Troelsen) | 2015 | — | — | 76 | — | — | — | 84 | — | — | — | GLF: Gold | Together |
| "Wombass" (with Oliver Heldens) | 2015 | — | — | 67 | — | — | — | — | — | — | — | | Together |
| "Get Down" (with Tony Junior) | 2015 | — | — | — | — | — | — | — | — | — | 50 | | Non-album singles |
| "The Right Song" (with Oliver Heldens featuring Natalie La Rose) | 2016 | 46 | — | — | — | — | 57 | 100 | 39 | — | 22 | BPI: Gold | Non-album singles |
| "Making Me Dizzy" (with Bobby Puma) | 2016 | — | — | — | — | — | — | — | — | — | — | | Non-album singles |
| "What You're Waiting For" (with Ummet Ozcan) | 2016 | — | — | — | — | — | — | — | — | — | — | | Non-album singles |
| "Summer Nights" (featuring John Legend) | 2016 | 23 | — | 31 | — | — | — | 72 | 60 | — | 13 | | Non-album singles |
| "On My Way" (featuring Bright Sparks) | 2017 | 26 | — | — | — | — | — | 87 | — | — | 36 | | Non-album singles |
| "Boom" (with Sevenn) | 2017 | — | — | — | — | — | — | 77 | — | — | — | | Club Life, Vol. 5 - China |
| "Harder" (with Kshmr featuring Talay Riley) | 2017 | — | — | — | — | — | — | — | — | — | — (Note: "Harder" did not enter the US Hot Dance/Electronic Songs chart but peaked at number 28 on the Dance/Mix Show Airplay chart.) | | Club Life, Vol. 5 - China |
| "Scream" (with John Christian) | 2017 | — | — | — | — | — | — | — | — | — | — | | Club Life, Vol. 5 - China |
| "Carry You Home" (featuring Stargate and Aloe Blacc) | 2017 | 38 | — | — | — | — | — | — | — | — | 26 | | Club Life, Vol. 5 - China |
| "Boom" (with Gucci Mane and Sevenn) | 2018 | — | — | — | — | — | — | 77 | — | — | 14 | GLF: Platinum | Club Life, Vol. 5 - China |
| "Jackie Chan" (with Dzeko featuring Preme and Post Malone) | 2018 | 2 | 19 | 13 | 7 | 25 | 6 | 20 | 5 | 52 | 3 | BEA: Gold; BPI: 2× Platinum; BVMI: Gold; GLF: 2× Platinum; IFPI AUT: Gold; IFPI DEN: Gold; MC: 7× Platinum; RIAA: Platinum | The London Sessions |
| "Wow" | 2018 | — | — | — | — | — | — | — | — | — | — (Note: "Wow" did not enter the US Hot Dance/Electronic Songs, but peaked at number 15 on the Dance/Electronic Digital Song Sales component chart.) | | Non-album singles |
| "Grapevine" | 2018 | — | — | — | — | — | — | — | — | — | 35 | | Non-album singles |
| "Ritual" (with Jonas Blue and Rita Ora) | 2019 | 5 | — | 10 | 99 | — | 13 | 24 | 24 | — | 13 | BEA: Gold; BPI: Platinum; GLF: Platinum; IFPI DEN: Gold; MC: Platinum | The London Sessions |
| "God Is a Dancer" (with Mabel) | 2019 | 16 | — | 48 | — | 95 | 25 | 56 | 15 | — | 13 | BPI: Gold | The London Sessions |
| "Blue" (featuring Stevie Appleton) | 2019 | — | — | — (Note: "Blue" did not chart on the Ultratop 50 Flanders, but did peak at number 23 on the related Dance/Electronic Songs chart.) | — | — | — | — | — | — | 35 | | The London Sessions |
| "Nothing Really Matters" (with Becky Hill) | 2020 | 17 | — | — | — | — | — | — | 76 | — | 24 | | The London Sessions |
| "Tomorrow" (featuring 433) | 2020 | — | — | — | — | — | — | — | — | — | — | | Non-album singles |
| "5 Seconds Before Sunrise" (as Ver:West) | 2020 | — | — | — (Note: "5 Seconds Before Sunrise" did not chart on the Ultratop 50 Flanders, but did peak at number 18 on the related Dance/Electronic Songs chart.) | — | — | — | — | — | — | — | | Non-album singles |
| "Coffee (Give Me Something)" (with Vintage Culture) | 2020 | — | — | — (Note: "Coffee (Give Me Something)" did not chart on the Ultratop 50 Flanders, but did peak at number 43 on the related Dance/Electronic Songs chart.) | — | — | — | — | — | — | 44 | | Non-album singles |
| "The Business" | 2020 | 1 | 6 | 2 | 13 | 3 | 1 | 11 | 3 | 69 | 2 | ARIA: 5× Platinum; BEA: Platinum; BPI: 2× Platinum; BVMI: 3× Gold; IFPI AUT: 3× Platinum; IFPI DEN: 2× Platinum; MC: 8× Platinum; RIAA: Platinum | Drive |
| "The Business Part II" (with Ty Dolla Sign) | 2021 | — | — | — | — | — | — | — | — | — | — | | Non-album singles |
| "Elements of a New Life" (as Ver:West) | 2021 | — | — | — | — | — | — | — | — | — | — | | Non-album singles |
| "Don't Be Shy" (with Karol G) | 2021 | 16 | — | — | 81 | — | 64 | 81 | — | — (Note: "Don't Be Shy" did not enter the Billboard Hot 100, but peaked at number 24 on the Bubbling Under Hot 100 chart.) | 4 | ARIA: Gold; BPI: Silver; MC: Platinum; RIAA: Gold | Drive |
| "The Motto" (with Ava Max) | 2021 | 1 | 10 | 3 | 6 | 10 | 6 | 21 | 12 | 42 | 2 | ARIA: 2× Platinum; BPI: Platinum; BVMI: Platinum; IFPI AUT: 2× Platinum; IFPI DEN: Platinum; MC: 7× Platinum; RIAA: Platinum | Drive |
| "Hot in It" (with Charli XCX) | 2022 | 12 | — | — | 85 | 76 | 27 | 56 | 24 | — | 10 | BPI: Silver; MC: Gold | Drive |
| "Can U Dance (To My Beat)" | 2022 | — | — | — | — | — | — | — | — | — | — | | Non-album single |
| "Baila Conmigo" | 2022 | — | — | — | — | — | — | — | — | — | 49 | | Non-album single |
| "Pump It Louder" (with Black Eyed Peas) | 2022 | — | — | — | — | — | — | — | — | — | 28 | | Drive |
| "10:35" (with Tate McRae) | 2022 | 12 | 10 | 23 | 18 | 11 | 5 | 40 | 8 | 69 | 3 | ARIA: Platinum; BPI: Gold; BVMI: Gold; IFPI AUT: Platinum; IFPI DEN: Platinum; MC: 5× Platinum; RIAA: Platinum | Drive |
| "I Can't Wait" (with Solardo featuring Poppy Baskcomb) | 2022 | — | — | — | — | — | — | — | — | — | — | | Non-album single |
| "Lay Low" | 2023 | 4 | 8 | 13 | — | 10 | 74 | 63 | — | — | 13 | BPI: Silver; BVMI: Gold; IFPI AUT: Platinum; IFPI DEN: Gold; MC: 2× Platinum | Drive |
| "All Nighter" | 2023 | — | — | — | — | — | — | — | — | — | 17 | | Drive |
| "Feel Your Ghost" (with Mathame) | 2023 | — | — | — | — | — | — | — | — | — | — | | TBA |
| "Yesterday" | 2023 | — | — | — | — | — | — | — | — | — | 34 | | Drive |
| "Drifting" | 2023 | 16 | — | — | — | — | — | — | — | — | 29 | BPI: Silver | TBA |
| "Both" (with 21 Savage and Bia) | 2023 | — | — | — | — | — | — | — (Note: "Both" did not enter the Swedish Singellista Chart, but peaked at number 15 on the Swedish Heatseeker Chart.) | — | — | 11 | | TBA |
| "Run Free (Countdown)" (with R3hab) | 2023 | — | — | — | — | — | — | — | — | — | — | | TBA |
| "Thank You (Not So Bad)" (with Dimitri Vegas & Like Mike, Dido and W&W) | 2023 | 16 | 14 | 28 | — | 16 | 36 | 33 | 50 | — | 12 | BPI: Gold; IFPI DEN: Gold | TBA |
| "All My Life" (with Fast Boy) | 2024 | 27 | — | 38 | — | — | — | — | — | — | 26 | | TBA |
| "Waterslides" (with Rudimental and ABsolutely) | 2024 | — | — | — | — | — | — | — | — | — | 36 | | TBA |
| "Contigo" (with Karol G) | 2024 | — | — | — | — | — | — | — (Note: "Contigo" did not enter the Swedish Singellista Chart, but peaked at number 16 on the Swedish Heatseeker Chart.) | — | 61 | 5 | | TBA |
| "Explode" (with Moguai) | 2024 | — | — | — | — | — | — | — | — | — | 40 | | TBA |
| "My City" (with Prophecy) | 2024 | — | — | — | — | — | — | — | — | — | 46 | | TBA |
| "Mockingbird" (with Dimitri Vegas and Like Mike, and Gabry Ponte) | 2024 | — | — | — | — | — | — | — | — | — | — | | Non-album singles |
| "Click Click Click" (with Hedex and Basslayerz) | 2024 | — | — | — | — | — | — | — | — | — | — | | Non-album singles |
| "Zenless" (with Lucas & Steve) | 2024 | — | — | — | — | — | — | — | — | — | — | | Zenless Zone Zero |
| "Hot Honey" (with Alana Springsteen) | 2024 | — | — | — | — | — | — | — | — | — | 37 | | Non-album singles |
| "Tantalizing" (with Soaky Siren) | 2024 | — | — | — | — | — | — | — | — | — | 38 | | Non-album singles |
| "Una Velita" | 2024 | — | — | — | — | — | — | — | — | — | 35 | | Non-album singles |
| "Tell Me Where U Go" (with Clean Bandit and Leony) | 2025 | — | ― | ― | ― | ― | ― | ― | ― | ― | ― | | TBA |
| "Won't Be Possible" (with Odd Mob and Goodboys) | 2025 | — | ― | ― | ― | ― | ― | ― | ― | ― | 11 | | TBA |
| "Everlight" (with Mathame) | 2025 | — | — | — | — | — | — | — | — | — | — | | TBA |
| "RVN" | 2025 | — | — | — | — | — | — | — | — | — | — | | TBA |
| "Bring Me to Life" (with Fors) | 2025 | — | — | — | — | — | — | — | — | — | 16 | | TBA |
| "Beautiful Places" (with Brieanna Grace) | 2026 | — | — | — | — | — | — | — | — | — | 25 | | TBA |
| "Don't Lose Your Head" (with Olivia Sebastianelli) | 2026 | — | — | — | — | — | — | — | — | — | — | | TBA |
"—" denotes a recording that did not chart or was not released in that territory.

=== As featured artist ===
List of singles as featured artist, with selected chart positions, showing year released and album name
| Title | Year | Peak chart positions | | Album |
| Title | Year | UK | US Dance Dig. | Album |
|---|---|---|---|---|
| "Only You" (with Kaskade featuring Haley) | 2010 | — | 44 | Dynasty |
| "The First Note Is Silent" (High Contrast featuring Tiësto and Underworld) | 2011 | 48 | — | The Agony & the Ecstasy |
| "Tornado" (with Steve Aoki) | 2011 | — | 39 | Steve Aoki Charitable Fund Mix |
| "People of the Night" (vs. AN21 and Max Vangeli featuring Lover Lover) | 2012 | — | — | People of the Night |
| "Beautiful World" (with Mark Knight featuring Dino) | 2012 | — | — | The Sound of Toolroom |
"—" denotes a recording that did not chart or was not released in that territory.

=== Promotional singles ===
List of promotional singles, showing year released and album name
| Title | Year | Peak chart positions | Album |
| Title | Year | US Dance | Album |
|---|---|---|---|
| "Battleship Grey" (featuring Kirsty Hawkshaw) | 2001 | — | In My Memory |
| "Dallas 4pm" / "Magik Journey" | 2003 | — | In My Memory |
| "Sweet Things" (featuring Charlotte Martin) | 2007 | — | Elements of Life |
| "Knock You Out" (featuring Emily Haines) | 2009 | — | Kaleidoscope |
| "I Am Strong" (featuring Priscilla Ahn) | 2009 | — | Kaleidoscope |
| "Louder Than Boom" | 2009 | — | Kaleidoscope |
| "Speed Rail" | 2010 | — (Note: "Speed Rail" did not enter the US Hot Dance/Electronic Songs chart but peaked at number 45 on the Dance/Electronic Digital Song Sales component chart.) | Non-album promotional singles |
| "Green Sky" | 2011 | — | Non-album promotional singles |
| "Young Lions" | 2011 | — | Non-album promotional singles |
| "iTrance" (featuring Disco Fries) | 2013 | — | Rehash |
| "Infected" (with Jauz) | 2016 | — | Non-album promotional singles |
| "I Want You" (with Mike Williams) | 2016 | — | Non-album promotional singles |
| "Your Love" (with DallasK) | 2016 | — | Non-album promotional singles |
| "I Like It Loud" (with John Christian featuring Marshall Masters and The Ultimate MC) | 2018 | — | I Like It Loud |
| "Dawnbreaker" (with Matisse & Sadko) | 2018 | — | I Like It Loud |
| "Coming Home" (with Mesto) | 2018 | — | I Like It Loud |
| "Break the House Down" (with MOTi) | 2018 | — | I Like It Loud |
| "Affliction" (with Zaxx featuring Olivera) | 2018 | — | Ninjawerks, Vol. 1 |
| "Halfway There" (with Dzeko featuring Lena Leon) | 2019 | — | Together |
| "Can You Feel It" (with John Christian) | 2019 | — | Together |
| "Can't Get Enough" (with Mesto) | 2019 | — | Together |
| "Trouble" (with 7 Skies featuring Micky Blue) | 2019 | — | Together |
| "Party Time" (with SWACQ) | 2019 | — | Together |
| "My Whistle" (with Sikdope) | 2019 | — | Together |
| "Lose Control" (with Stoltenhoff) | 2019 | — | Together |
| "Diamonds" (with Aazar featuring Micky Blue) | 2019 | — | Together |
| "Feels So Good" (with Justin Caruso featuring Kelli-Leigh) | 2019 | — | Together |
| "Acordeão" (with Moska) | 2019 | — | Together |
| "My Frequency" (with 7 Skies featuring RebMoe) | 2020 | 15 | Together |
| "The Drop" (with DJs from Mars, Rudeejay and Da Brozz) | 2020 | — | Musical Freedom Unlimited |
| "Clickbait" | 2021 | — | Together Again |
| "Oohla Oohla" (with Lucas & Steve) | 2021 | 28 | Together Again |
| "I'll Take You High" | 2021 | — | Together Again |
| "Money" (with Killfake) | 2021 | — | Together Again |
| "Be Something" (with Ummet Ozcan and Tomhio) | 2021 | — | Together Again |
| "Savage" (with Deorro) | 2022 | 24 | Together Again |
| "Renaissance (The White Lotus)" (Tiësto remix) | 2023 | 35 | Non-album promotional single |
| "OMG!" (with Sexyy Red) | 2025 | 8 | F1 the Album |
"—" denotes a recording that did not chart or was not released in that territory.

== Other charted songs ==
List of other charted songs, showing year released and album name
| Title | Year | Peak chart positions | Album |
| Title | Year | US Dance | Album |
|---|---|---|---|
| "Don't Ditch" (with Marcel Woods) | 2011 | — (Note: "Don't Ditch" did not enter the US Hot Dance/Electronic Songs chart but peaked at number 22 on the Dance/Electronic Digital Song Sales component chart.) | Club Life, Vol. 1 - Las Vegas |
| "Last Train" (with Firebeatz featuring Ladyhawke) | 2014 | 35 | A Town Called Paradise |
| "Set Yourself Free" (featuring Krewella) | 2014 | — (Note: "Set Yourself Free" did not enter the US Hot Dance/Electronic Songs chart but peaked at number 49 on the Dance/Electronic Digital Song Sales component chart.) | A Town Called Paradise |
| "Seavolution" | 2018 | 41 | Hotel Transylvania 3 |
| "Wave Rider" | 2018 | — (Note: "Wave Rider" did not enter the US Hot Dance/Electronic Songs chart but peaked at number 21 on the Dance/Electronic Digital Song Sales component chart.) | Hotel Transylvania 3 |
| "Tear It Down" | 2018 | — (Note: "Wave Rider" did not enter the US Hot Dance/Electronic Songs chart but peaked at number 25 on the Dance/Electronic Digital Song Sales component chart.) | Hotel Transylvania 3 |
| "My Frequency" (with 7 Skies featuring RebMoe) | 2020 | — (Note: "My Frequency" did not enter the US Hot Dance/Electronic Songs chart but peaked at number 15 on the Dance/Electronic Digital Song Sales component chart.) | Together |
| "Lose You" | 2020 | 37 | The London Sessions |
| "Chills (LA Hills)" (featuring A Boogie wit da Hoodie) | 2023 | 11 | Drive |
"—" denotes a recording that did not chart or was not released in that territory.

== Remixes ==
List of remixes, showing year released and original artists
| Title | Year | Original artist(s) |
|---|---|---|
| "Dans la Boîte" (DJ Tiësto Remix) | 1995 | West and Storm |
| "Insomnia" (DJ Tiësto Remix) | 1995 | Faithless |
| "Innocence" (DJ Tiësto's Magikal Remake) | 1998 | The MacKenzie featuring Jessy |
| "You're So Beautiful" (DJ Tiësto and Montana Beautiful Remix) | 1998 | Rene and Da Groove |
| "Destination Sunshine" (DJ Tiësto's Power Mix) | 1999 | Balearic Bill |
| "Sirius" (DJ Tiësto Remix) | 1999 | Subtle by Design |
| "Coming On Strong" (DJ Tiësto Remix) | 1999 | Signum featuring Scott Mac |
| "Dreaming" (DJ Tiësto Remix) | 1999 | BT featuring Kirsty Hawkshaw |
| "L'Esperanza" (DJ Tiësto Remix) | 1999 | Airscape |
| "Willow" (DJ Tiësto Magikal Remake) | 2000 | Aria |
| "Eugina" (DJ Tiësto Remix) | 2000 | Salt Tank |
| "Re-Form" (DJ Tiësto Remix) | 2000 | Kid Vicious |
| "Shining" (DJ Tiësto Remix) | 2000 | Green Court |
| "Sunrise" (DJ Tiësto Remix) | 2000 | Goldenscan |
| "The Sound of the Drums" (DJ Tiësto Remix) | 2000 | E.V.O. |
| "Blaxo" (DJ Tiësto Remix) | 2000 | DJ Jan |
| "Caught Me Running" (DJ Tiësto's Summerbreeze Remix) | 2000 | Jaimy and Kenny D. |
| "Silence" (DJ Tiësto In Search of Sunrise Remix) | 2000 | Delerium |
| "Velvet Moods" (DJ Tiësto Remix) | 2000 | Johan Gielen Presents Abnea |
| "Das Glockenspiel" (DJ Tiësto Remix) | 2001 | Schiller |
| "When Time Will Come" (DJ Tiësto Mix) | 2001 | Motorcraft |
| "Flesh" (DJ Tiësto Mix) | 2001 | Jan Johnston |
| "Tarantula" (DJ Tiësto Remix) | 2001 | Faithless |
| "Innocente" (DJ Tiësto Remix) | 2001 | Delerium |
| "Home" (DJ Tiësto Remix) | 2001 | Coast 2 Coast |
| "Never" (DJ Tiësto Remix) | 2002 | Roc Project featuring Tina Arena |
| "Can't Live A Day" (DJ Tiësto Mix) | 2002 | Avalon |
| "We Know What You Did..." (DJ Tiësto Remix) | 2002 | Svenson & Gielen |
| "Southern Sun" (DJ Tiësto Remix) | 2002 | Paul Oakenfold |
| "We Are All Made of Stars" (DJ Tiësto's Full Vocal Mix) | 2002 | Moby |
| "Extreme Ways" (DJ Tiësto's Vocal Remix) | 2002 | Moby |
| "Pulsar" (DJ Tiësto Remix) | 2002 | Mauro Picotto |
| "Action" (DJ Tiësto Remix) | 2002 | Saint Etienne |
| "Did I Dream" (DJ Tiësto Remix) | 2002 | Lost Witness |
| "Breezer" (DJ Tiësto Remix) | 2002 | Junkie XL and Sasha |
| "Faithfulness" (DJ Tiësto Mix) | 2003 | Skin |
| "Venus (Meant to Be Your Lover)" (Tiësto Remix) | 2003 | DJ Cor Fijneman featuring Jan Johnston |
| "Street Spirit" (DJ Tiësto Remix) | 2003 | Radiohead |
| "Kiss in Shadows" (Tiësto Remix) | 2003 | M-Box featuring Tiff Lacey |
| "Die Another Day" (Tiësto Remix) | 2003 | Madonna |
| "Rain Down on Me" (Tiësto Remix) | 2003 | Kane |
| "Mer Noire" (Tiësto Remix) | 2004 | Cirque Du Soleil |
| "The Force of Gravity" (Tiësto Remix) | 2004 | BT |
| "Crosses" (Tiësto Remix) | 2006 | José González |
| "Open Your Eyes" (Tiësto Remix) | 2007 | Snow Patrol |
| "Hide and Seek" (Tiësto Remix) | 2007 | Imogen Heap |
| "LoveStoned/I Think She Knows" (Tiësto Remix) | 2007 | Justin Timberlake |
| "Back in Your Head" (Tiësto Remix) | 2007 | Tegan and Sara |
| "The Right Life" (Tiësto Remix) | 2007 | Seal |
| "Piece of Me" (Tiësto Remix) | 2007 | Britney Spears |
| "Ride" (Tiësto Remix) | 2008 | Cary Brothers |
| "No Air" (Tiësto Remix) | 2008 | Jordin Sparks |
| "Imagination" (Tiësto Remix) | 2008 | JES |
| "Pare Pare" (Tiësto Remix) | 2008 | Tarkan |
| "Not Falling Apart" (Tiësto Remix) | 2008 | Maroon 5 |
| "Spaceman" (Tiësto Remix) | 2009 | The Killers |
| "I'm Not Alone" (Tiësto Remix) | 2009 | Calvin Harris |
| "Heads Will Roll" (Tiësto Remix) | 2009 | Yeah Yeah Yeahs |
| "One More Chance" (Tiësto Remix) | 2009 | Bloc Party |
| "Manos Al Aire" (Tiësto Remix) | 2009 | Nelly Furtado |
| "The Right Life" (Tiësto Remix) | 2009 | Seal |
| "Summersault" (Tiësto Remix) | 2009 | Tastexperience |
| "Papillon" (Tiësto Remix) | 2009 | Editors |
| "Resistance" (Tiësto Remix) | 2009 | Muse |
| "Let's Get Bleeped Tonight" (Tiësto Remix) | 2009 | Dada Life |
| "C'est dans l'air" (Tiësto Remix) | 2009 | Mylène Farmer |
| "Out of the Blue 2010" (Tiësto Remix) | 2009 | System F |
| "Rocket" (Tiësto Remix) | 2010 | Goldfrapp |
| "Trouble Is" (Tiësto Remix) | 2010 | Turboweekend |
| "These New Knights" (Tiësto Remix) | 2010 | Où Est Le Swimming Pool |
| "Spark" (Tiësto Remix) | 2010 | Amy MacDonald |
| "Tweak Your Nipple" (Tiësto Remix) | 2010 | Faithless |
| "Phazing" (Tiësto Remix) | 2010 | Dirty South featuring Rudy |
| "Have It All" (Tiësto Remix) | 2010 | Charlie Dée |
| "The Island" (Tiësto Remix) | 2010 | Pendulum |
| "We Live for the Music" (Tiësto Remix) | 2010 | Robbie Rivera |
| "Bad Romance" (Tiësto Remix) | 2010 | Lady Gaga |
| "Shot in the Back of the Head" (Tiësto Remix) | 2010 | Moby |
| "Nova" (Tiësto Remix) | 2010 | The Sound of Arrows |
| "Love, the Hardest Way" (Tiësto Remix) | 2010 | HIM |
| "Dame Argumentos" (Tiësto remix) | 2010 | Miguel Bosé |
| "E.T." (Tiësto Remix) | 2011 | Katy Perry |
| "Ace of Hz" (Tiësto Remix) | 2011 | Ladytron |
| "Lost in the World" (Tiësto Remix) | 2011 | Kanye West |
| "M.A.J.O.R." (Tiësto Remix) | 2011 | Kay |
| "Fire in the House" (Tiësto Remix) | 2011 | Hard-Fi |
| "Advanced" (Tiësto Remix) | 2011 | Marcel Woods |
| "Slaughter House" (Tiësto Remix) | 2011 | Joker featuring Silas |
| "The First Note Is Silent" (Tiësto Remix) | 2011 | High Contrast featuring Tiësto and Underworld |
| "Paradise" (Tiësto Remix) | 2011 | Coldplay |
| "Mission Impossible Theme (Tiësto Remix) | 2011 | Lalo Schifrin |
| "Somebody That I Used to Know" (Tiësto Remix) | 2012 | Gotye featuring Kimbra |
| "Bring That Beat Back" (Tiësto Remix) | 2012 | Autoerotique |
| "Can't Stop Me" (Tiësto Remix) | 2012 | Afrojack and Shermanology |
| "Young Blood" (Tiësto and Hardwell Remix) | 2012 | The Naked & Famous |
| "Just One Last Time" (Tiësto Remix) | 2012 | David Guetta featuring Taped Rai |
| "Sweet Nothing" (Tiësto Remix) | 2012 | Calvin Harris featuring Florence Welch |
| "Thoughts" (Tiësto Remix) | 2012 | Nelly Furtado featuring The Kenyan Boys Choir |
| "Parking Lot" (Tiësto Remix) | 2012 | Nelly Furtado |
| "We Come Running" (Tiësto Remix) | 2012 | Youngblood Hawke |
| "Carried Away" (Tiësto Remix) | 2013 | Passion Pit |
| "Clarity" (Tiësto Remix) | 2013 | Zedd featuring Foxes |
| "So Young So High" (Tiësto Remix) | 2013 | Dada Life |
| "Get Loose" (Tiësto Remix) | 2013 | Showtek and Noisecontrollers |
| "Love Is the Answer" (Tiësto Remix) | 2013 | Jus Jack and Oza featuring Blessid Union of Souls |
| "Sweet Nothing" (Tiësto and Ken Loi Re-Remix) | 2013 | Calvin Harris featuring Florence Welch |
| "United" (Tiësto and Blasterjaxx Remix) | 2013 | Tiësto, Quintino and Alvaro |
| "I Love It" (Tiësto Remix) | 2013 | Icona Pop featuring Charli XCX |
| "Century" (Tiësto and Moska Remix) | 2013 | Tiësto featuring Calvin Harris |
| "Standing On the Sun" (Tiësto Remix) | 2013 | Beyoncé |
| "Burn" (Tiësto Remix) | 2013 | Ellie Goulding |
| "Stay the Night" (Tiësto's Club Life Remix) | 2013 | Zedd featuring Hayley Williams |
| "Coming Down (Hi-Life)" (Tiësto Remix) | 2013 | Monkey Safari |
| "The Spark" (Tiёsto vs. twoloud Remix) | 2013 | Afrojack featuring Spree Wilson |
| "Dare You" (Tiësto vs. twoloud Remix) | 2014 | Hardwell featuring Matthew Koma |
| "All of Me" (Tiësto's Birthday Treatment Remix) | 2014 | John Legend |
| "Buffalo Bill" (Tiësto Remix) | 2014 | Moxie Raia |
| "Playground" (Tiësto Remix) | 2014 | Jack Eye Jones |
| "You" (Tiësto vs. twoloud Remix) | 2014 | Galantis |
| "Anywhere for You" (Tiësto vs. Dzeko & Torres Remix) | 2014 | John Martin |
| "Midnight" (Tiësto Remix) | 2014 | Coldplay |
| "Helium" (Tiësto Remix) | 2014 | Chris Lake featuring Jareth |
| "Bang" (Tiësto Bootleg) | 2014 | 3lau |
| "Samurai" (Tiësto Remix) | 2014 | R3hab |
| "Believer" (Tiësto Remix) | 2014 | American Authors |
| "Never Say Never" (Tiësto and MOTi Remix) | 2014 | Basement Jaxx |
| "Gold Skies" (Tiësto Remix) | 2014 | Sander van Doorn, Martin Garrix and DVBBS featuring Aleesia |
| "Break the Rules" (Tiësto Remix) | 2014 | Charli XCX |
| "Light Years Away" (Tiësto and MOTi Remix) | 2014 | Tiësto featuring DBX |
| "Don't Leave" (Tiësto Remix) | 2014 | Seven Lions featuring Ellie Goulding |
| "Often" (Tiësto Remix) | 2014 | The Weeknd |
| "Drunk in Love" (Tiësto Remix) | 2014 | Beyoncé |
| "Stay a While" (Tiësto Remix) | 2015 | Mikey B |
| "Lay Me Down" (Tiёsto Remix) | 2015 | Sam Smith |
| "Stranger to Love" (Tiësto Remix) | 2015 | Charles Perry |
| "Home" (Tiësto vs. twoloud Remix) | 2015 | Dotan |
| "House of Now" (Tiësto Edit) | 2015 | MOTi |
| "Lean On" (Tiësto and MOTi Remix) | 2015 | Major Lazer and DJ Snake featuring MØ |
| "Fighting For" (Tiësto Edit) | 2015 | Wee-O featuring Morgan Karr |
| "Someone Somewhere" (Tiësto Edit) | 2015 | Bobby Puma |
| "Sky High" (Tiësto Edit) | 2015 | Firebeatz |
| "Let You Go" (Tiësto Remix) | 2015 | The Chainsmokers featuring Great Good Fine Ok |
| "Take Me Home" (Tiësto Remix) | 2015 | Jess Glynne |
| "God Is a DJ 2.0" (Tiësto Remix) | 2015 | Faithless |
| "L'Amour Toujours" (Tiësto Edit) | 2015 | Dzeko & Torres featuring Delaney Jane |
| "Break the Rules" (Tiësto Remix) | 2015 | Charli XCX |
| "Faded" (Tiësto's Deep House Remix) | 2016 | Alan Walker |
| "Faded" (Tiësto's Northern Lights Remix) | 2016 | Alan Walker |
| "Coming Over" (Tiësto Remix) | 2016 | Dillon Francis and Kygo |
| "Winterbreak" (Tiësto's Deep House Remix) | 2016 | MUNA |
| "Dancing on My Own" (Tiësto Remix) | 2016 | Calum Scott |
| "Let Me Love You" (Tiësto's AFTR:HRS Remix) | 2016 | DJ Snake featuring Justin Bieber |
| "My Way" (Tiësto Remix) | 2016 | Calvin Harris |
| "This Town" (Tiësto Remix) | 2016 | Niall Horan |
| "Hard To Love" (Tiësto's Big Room Remix) | 2017 | Matthew Koma |
| "It Ain't Me" (Tiësto's AFTR:HRS Remix) | 2017 | Kygo and Selena Gomez |
| "Malibu" (Tiësto Remix) | 2017 | Miley Cyrus |
| "Unforgettable" (Tiësto and Dzeko AFTR:HRS Remix) | 2017 | French Montana featuring Swae Lee |
| "Time" (Tiësto's Big Room Remix) | 2017 | Z.Tao |
| "Silence" (Tiësto's Big Room Remix) | 2017 | Marshmello featuring Khalid |
| "What About Us" (Tiësto's AFTR:HRS Remix) | 2017 | P!nk |
| "Bum Bum Tam Tam" (Tiësto and Swacq Remix) | 2018 | Mc Fioti, J Balvin and Future |
| "Happier" (Tiësto's AFTR:HRS Remix) | 2018 | Ed Sheeran |
| "Jackie Chan" (Tiësto Big Room Remix) | 2018 | Tiësto and Dzeko featuring Preme and Post Malone |
| "Pulverturm" (Tiësto's Big Room Remix) | 2019 | Niels van Gogh |
| "Mama" (Tiësto's Big Room Remix) | 2019 | Clean Bandit featuring Ellie Goulding |
| "Bad Guy" (Tiësto's Big Room Remix) | 2019 | Billie Eilish |
| "Obsessed" (Tiësto Remix) | 2019 | Dynoro and Ina Wroldsen |
| "Tough Love" (Tiësto Remix) | 2019 | Avicii featuring Agnes, Vargas & Lagola |
| "Summer Days" (Tiësto Remix) | 2019 | Martin Garrix featuring Macklemore and Patrick Stump |
| "Good Things Fall Apart" (Tiësto's Big Room Remix) | 2019 | Illenium featuring Jon Bellion |
| "Look Back at It" (Tiësto and Swacq Remix) | 2019 | A Boogie wit da Hoodie |
| "You Should Be Sad" (Tiësto Remix) | 2020 | Halsey |
| "Stand by Me" (Tiësto Remix) | 2020 | John Newman |
| "Double Trouble" (Tiësto's Euro 90s Tribute Remix) | 2020 | Will Ferrell and My Marianne |
| "Dancing in the Moonlight" (Tiësto Remix) | 2020 | Jubël featuring Neimy |
| "Head & Heart" (Tiësto Remix) | 2020 | Joel Corry and MNEK |
| "Resilient" (Tiësto Remix) | 2020 | Katy Perry featuring Aitana |
| "Your Love (9PM)" (Tiësto Remix) | 2021 | ATB, Topic and A7S |
| "Fool's Gold" (Tiësto 24 Karat Gold Edition) | 2021 | Sofia Carson |
| "Selfish Love" (Tiësto Remix) | 2021 | DJ Snake and Selena Gomez |
| "Imagine" (Tiësto Remix) | 2021 | Ben Platt |
| "Higher Power" (Tiësto Remix) | 2021 | Coldplay |
| "Diamond Veins" (Ver:West Remix) | 2021 | French 79 |
| "Pepas" (Tiësto Remix) | 2021 | Farruko |
| "Love Is Gone" (Tiësto Remix) | 2021 | Slander and Dylan Matthew |
| "The Motto" (Tiësto's New Year's Eve VIP Mix) | 2021 | Tiësto and Ava Max |
| "Melody" (Tiësto Remix) | 2022 | Sigala |
| "Do It to It" (Tiësto Remix) | 2022 | Acraze featuring Cherish |
| "Light Switch" (Tiësto Remix) | 2022 | Charlie Puth |
| "Barbie Girl" (Tiësto Remix) | 2023 | Aqua |
| "Provenza" (Tiësto Remix) | 2023 | Karol G |
| "Shakira: Bzrp Music Sessions, Vol. 53" (Tiësto Remix) | 2024 | Bizarrap and Shakira |
