= Light Years Away =

Light Years Away may refer to:

- Light Years Away (film), a 1981 film directed by Alain Tanner
- "Light Years Away" (Warp 9 song)", a song by Warp 9 from the album It's a Beat Wave
- "Light Years Away" (G.E.M. song), a song by G.E.M. from the soundtrack to the 2016 film Passengers
- Light Years Away (Tiësto song), 2014
- "Light Years Away", a song by Joe Satriani from the album Black Swans and Wormhole Wizards
