= Creatures of the deep =

Creatures of the deep may refer to:

- Deep-sea community
- "Creatures of the Deep" (Life), a 2009 BBC television documentary episode
- Exotic Creatures of the Deep, album by Sparks released in 2008
- Lost Treasures: Creatures of the Deep, album by trance DJ/producer Tiësto released in 1997
- Creatures of the Deep, a fishing mobile game by Infinite Dreams Inc. released in 2022 and its original version Hooked On: Creatures of the Deep released in 2008
