= Halfway There =

Halfway There may refer to:

- "Halfway There", a song by Big Time Rush from BTR, 2010
- "Halfway There", a song by Greg Page from his debut album, 1998
- "Halfway There", a song by Mike Rutherford from Acting Very Strange, 1982
- "Halfway There", a song by Rozes, 2019
- "Halfway There", a song by Soundgarden from King Animal, 2012
- "Halfway There" (Tiësto and Dzeko song), 2019

== See also ==
- Half Way There, a 2019 album by Busted
