= Quilla =

Quilla may refer to:

- Barranquilla, or Quilla for short, a city in Colombia
- Quilla (musician) (born 1982), Canadian musician
- Quilla Constance (born 1980), British artist
- Mama Quilla, Inca deity

== See also ==
- Qila
- Quella
- Kwila
