= Magik One: First Flight =

Compilation album by DJ Tiësto
- Released: September 15, 1997 (Netherlands)
- Recorded: 1997
- Genre: Trance
- Length: 73:47; 196:30 (unmixed version)
- Label: Black Hole
- Producer: Tiësto

DJ Tiësto chronology
Forbidden Paradise 6: Valley of Fire (1996)	Magik One: First Flight (1997)	Lost Treasures: Creatures of the Deep (1997)

Alternative cover
- Patrick Woodroffe

Singles from Magik One: First Flight
- 1. "When She Left" Released: 1998

Professional ratings
Review scores
Source	Rating
Allmusic	link

Magik One: First Flight is the first album in the Magik series by trance artist DJ Tiësto, released in September 1997 in the Netherlands. As with the rest of the Magik series, the album is a live turntable mix.

In 2000, this album and its first three sequels were re-released with new sleeves due to the unauthorized use of Patrick Woodroffe's artwork.

== Track listing ==
Mixed Version

1. Sunday Club – "Healing Dream" – 7:05
2. Lock – "Into The Sun" – 4:29
3. Clear View – "Never Enough" – 4:15
4. Channel Tribe – "Program 1" – 3:32
5. Jake & Jesse – "Low Turbulence" – 4:29
6. Mockba – "Shell Shock" – 2:49
7. Allure – "When She Left" – 4:27
8. Mac Zimms – "L'Annonce Des Couleurs" – 5:51
9. Stray Dog – "Chapter Two" (Southsquare Mix) – 4:27
10. The Voyager – "Back On Earth" – 5:46
11. DJ Tiësto – "Long Way Home" – 3:16
12. Silent Breed – "Sync In" – 4:30
13. Club Quake – "Vicious Circle" – 3:25
14. Viper 2 – "Titty Twister" – 4:27
15. Qattara – "The Truth" (Coufsat Mix) – 6:43
16. DJ Sakin – "Blue Sky" – 4:16

Unmixed Version

1. Sunday Club – "Healing Dream" – 11:45
2. Lock – "Into The Sun" – 8:58
3. Clear View – "Never Enough" – 8:00
4. Channel Tribe – "Program 1" – 6:28
5. Jake & Jesse – "Low Turbulence" – 8:41
6. Mockba – "Shell Shock" – 6:45
7. Allure – "When She Left" – 5:21
8. Mac Zimms – "L'Annonce Des Couleurs" – 8:42
9. Stray Dog – "Chapter Two" (Southsquare Mix) – 6:49
10. The Voyager – "Back On Earth" – 9:52
11. DJ Tiësto – "Long Way Home" – 6:32
12. Silent Breed – "Sync In" – 5:56
13. Club Quake – "Vicious Circle" – 6:02
14. Viper 2 – "Titty Twister" – 7:03
15. Qattara – "The Truth" (Coufsat Mix) – 9:04
16. DJ Sakin – "Blue Sky" – 6:46
