= Pair of Dice =

Musical work by Tiësto and Allure

Single by Tiësto and Allure

from the album A Town Called Paradise
- Released: 8 October 2012
- Genre: Progressive house
- Length: 6:00
- Label: Musical Freedom; PIAS
- Songwriter(s): Tijs Verwest; Sjoerd Janssen; Wouter Janssen; David van den Hurk
- Producer(s): Tiësto; Allure

Tiësto singles chronology
| "We Own the Night" (2012) | "Pair of Dice" (2012) | "United" (2013) |

Allure singles chronology
| "You Say It'll Be Okay" (2012) | "Pair of Dice" (2012) | "Ready" (2013) |

"Pair of Dice" is an instrumental production by Dutch disc jockey and producer Tiësto and Dutch production band Allure, composed of the Janssen brothers, Sjoerd and Wouter (the two members of the duo Showtek) and David van den Hurk. It was released on 8 October 2012 in the Netherlands.

== Background and release ==
Allure is a hidden project launched by Tiësto in 1998 on Magik Muzik. He produced several trance songs with this alias until 2008. In 2011, he decided to widen the project to the duo Showtek. Together they produced an album in 2011, called Kiss from the Past. After the album, Tiësto left Allure and he has been substituted by David van den Hurk who represents Allure during live performances.'

It is the third time that the Janssen brothers collaborate with Tiësto after "Maximal Crazy" and "Hell Yeah!".

== Set Yourself Free ==
"Set Yourself Free"

Song by Tiësto featuring Krewella

from the album A Town Called Paradise
- Released: 13 June 2014
- Genre: Progressive house
- Length: 4:39
- Label: Musical Freedom; PM:AM; Casablanca; Republic; Universal
- Songwriter(s): Tijs Verwest; Sjoerd Janssen; Wouter Janssen; David van den Hurk; Jahan Yousaf; Yasmine Yousaf; Matthew Koma; Dan Book; Alexei Misoul; Kris Trindl
- Producer(s): Tiësto; Allure

Two years later, Tiësto release a vocal version of "Pair of Dice" called "Set Yourself Free" with credited vocals from American band Krewella and uncredited vocals from Matthew Koma for his fifth album A Town Called Paradise.

=== Background ===
Tiësto declared about the song : "I always thought it would be a great vocal track but never could find good vocals for it. So I sent the track to Krewella and they really did well in the moment. I like their voices. Together with Matthew Koma they came up with 'Set Yourself Free' and I think it's such a feel-good anthem. The melody and the music fit so well together."

== Track listing ==
Digital Download (MF024)

1. "Pair of Dice" - 6:00

2017 7" Translucent Pink Vinyl

1. "Pair of Dice" (Extended Mix) - 6:00
2. "Pair of Dice" (Radio Edit) - 3:06

== Charts ==
| Chart (2012) | Peak Position |
|---|---|
| Belgium Dance (Ultratop Wallonia) | 10 |
