= Red Lights (song) =

Single by Tiësto

from the album A Town Called Paradise
- Released: December 13, 2013
- Genre: Progressive house; dance-pop
- Length: 4:23 (main version); 3:21 (radio edit)
- Label: Musical Freedom; PM:AM; Casablanca; Republic; Universal
- Songwriters: Wayne Hector; Carl Falk; Michel Zitron; Rami Yacoub; Tijs Verwest; Måns Wredenberg
- Producers: Tiësto; Carl Falk; Rami Yacoub

Tiësto singles chronology
| "Take Me" (2013) | "Red Lights" (2013) | "Wasted" (2014) |

Music video
- "Red Lights" on YouTube

"Red Lights" is a song by Dutch DJ and record producer Tiësto. The song features uncredited vocals from Michel Zitron, who co-wrote the song with Tiësto, Wayne Hector, Carl Falk, Rami Yacoub and Måns Wredenberg. "Red Lights" was first released on 13 December 2013 by PM:AM Recordings as the lead single from Tiësto's fifth studio album, A Town Called Paradise (2014).

"Red Lights" is mostly a musical change from Tiësto's previous releases as it departs from his trademark trance influenced sound and sees him experimenting with new genres through the incorporation of acoustic elements into his music, which highlights his ability to adapt to the expanding EDM market.

"Red Lights" received generally mixed reviews from contemporary music critics and performed moderately well in most major music markets. It became Tiësto's first number-one hit in Scotland, his first top ten hit in the United Kingdom and his highest-charting single in Ireland and Australia. Additionally, "Red Lights" also became Tiësto's second highest-charting single in the United States, where it has peaked at number fifty-six on the US Billboard Hot 100. The song also peaked at number-two on the US Billboard Dance Club Songs and number-six on the US Billboard Dance/Electronic Songs charts.

On May 12, 2017, Tiësto released an official remix of "Red Lights" by electronic production duo Hungry Man Fun Man.

== Background and release ==
Tiësto's fifth studio album, A Town Called Paradise was released on 13 June 2014. While little was initially known regarding Tiësto's collaborators for the album, it had been revealed that the album would mark a departure from Tiësto's "traditional trance sound". "Red Lights" was eventually released as the album's lead single on 13 December 2013 after making its premier on 29 November 2013 on BBC Radio 1. The song's release coincided with Tiësto's move to Republic Records and his announcement of plans to release an "artist album" in 2014. Tiësto stated that "Red Lights" would be one of two songs unveiled prior to the release of "Footprints", another one of his songs which premiered at the TomorrowWorld Festival in September 2013.

During an interview with the Miami NewTimes, Tiësto revealed that the original version of "Red Lights" had been developed two and a half years prior to its release. Swedish record producer Rami Yacoub brought the song to Tiësto's attention by playing its chorus to him. Tiësto reflected on this experience by commenting, "I was like, Wow, this is so uplifting and euphoric! This is so me! And I knew that I wanted to work on the track. It was a very long process, but it was definitely worth it".

== Reception ==
Bill Lamb from About.com spoke positively about "Red Lights," describing it as a "wistful dance track that brings all the audio excitement of club music without any lyrics likely to offend" and subsequently ranked the song tenth on his list of "Top 10 Clean Party Songs for Kids." However, the song was not as well received by Joe Bish of The Guardian. In his review of newly released songs during the final week of February 2014, Bish initially praises the track, calling it "real dance music" but ultimately concludes that "it will come back to haunt you. Maybe not today, maybe not tomorrow, but soon, and for the rest of your life."

== Music video ==
The song's accompanying music video was released on 10 February 2014 and runs for approximately three minutes and thirty-two seconds. Tiësto describes "Red Lights" as a song about "letting loose of your inhibitions and running free" and states that the song's music video is a reflection of this. The video centres on two close friends who embark on a road trip to Las Vegas to attend one of Tiësto's shows in Hakkasan.

== Track listing ==
Digital download
| No. | Title | Length |
|---|---|---|
| 1. | "Red Lights" | 4:23 |

Remixes
| No. | Title | Length |
|---|---|---|
| 1. | "Red Lights" (extended mix) | 6:01 |
| 2. | "Red Lights" (Afrojack Remix) | 5:34 |
| 3. | "Red Lights" (twoloud Remix) | 5:50 |
| 4. | "Red Lights" (Fred Falke Remix) | 6:44 |
| 5. | "Red Lights" (Blame Remix) | 4:19 |
| Total length: | | 28:28 |

== Credits and personnel ==
- Songwriting – Wayne Hector, Carl Falk, Michel Zitron, Rami Yacoub, Tijs Verwest, Måns Wredenberg
- Production – Tiësto, Carl Falk, Rami Yacoub
- Additional production – John Amatiello, Dam Connolly, Dean Gillard and Matt Ward
- Mixing – Dean Gillard and Matt Ward

- All instruments played and programmed by Rami Yacoub, Carl Falk, Dean Gillard and Matt Ward
- Additional guitars – Carl Fark
- Vocals – Michel Zitron
- Mastered by Stuart Hawkes at Metropolis Studios, London

== Chart performance ==
"Red Lights" has performed moderately well worldwide, reaching the top forty on most of the charts it has entered. In the Netherlands, "Red Lights" debuted at number sixty-eight and eventually peaked at number forty-two on the Mega Single Top 100.

In Australia, "Red Lights" debuted at number forty-four and eventually peaked at number eight on the Australian ARIA Singles Chart, becoming Tiësto's first top ten single there. It has been certified Platinum by the Australian Recording Industry Association (ARIA) for shipments in excess of 70,000 copies. "Red Lights" also became Tiësto's highest-charting single in Ireland and his first top ten hit in the United Kingdom when it debuted at number three and number six on the Irish Singles Chart and UK Singles Charts respectively. Elsewhere in the world, "Red Lights" has reached number-one in Scotland, the top ten in Norway, Sweden and Denmark, the top twenty in Finland and Hungary and the top forty in Germany, Austria and Belgium (Flanders and Wallonia).

In the United States, "Red Lights" debuted at number ninety-seven on the US Billboard Hot 100 and eventually peaked at number fifty-six. It also topped the US Dance/Mix Show Airplay and reaching the top three of the US Dance/Electronic Songs and top ten of the US Dance Club Songs charts. In August 2014, "Red Lights" was certified Gold by the Recording Industry Association of America (RIAA) for shipments in excess of 500,000 copies. "Red Lights" enjoyed similar success in Canada, peaking at number forty-one on the Canadian Hot 100.

== Charts ==
=== Weekly charts ===
Weekly chart performance for "Red Lights"
| Chart (2013–2014) | Peak position |
|---|---|
| Australia (ARIA) | 8 |
| Austria (Ö3 Austria Top 40) | 36 |
| Belgium (Ultratip Bubbling Under Flanders) | 32 |
| Belgium Dance (Ultratop Flanders) | 28 |
| Belgium (Ultratip Bubbling Under Wallonia) | 20 |
| Belgium Dance (Ultratop Wallonia) | 16 |
| Canada Hot 100 (Billboard) | 41 |
| CIS Airplay (TopHit) | 55 |
| Czech Republic Airplay (ČNS IFPI) | 83 |
| Czech Republic Singles Digital (ČNS IFPI) | 47 |
| Denmark (Tracklisten) | 10 |
| Finland (Suomen virallinen lista) | 11 |
| France (SNEP) | 156 |
| Germany (GfK) | 29 |
| Hungary (Dance Top 40) | 39 |
| Hungary (Rádiós Top 40) | 8 |
| Hungary (Single Top 40) | 20 |
| Ireland (IRMA) | 3 |
| Netherlands (Dutch Top 40) | 22 |
| Netherlands (Single Top 100) | 42 |
| Norway (VG-lista) | 5 |
| Poland Dance (ZPAV) | 13 |
| Russia Airplay (TopHit) | 18 |
| Scottish Singles Sales (Official Charts) | 1 |
| Slovakia Airplay (ČNS IFPI) | 46 |
| Sweden (Sverigetopplistan) | 9 |
| Switzerland (Schweizer Hitparade) | 74 |
| UK Singles (Official Charts) | 6 |
| UK Dance (Official Charts) | 2 |
| Ukraine Airplay (TopHit) | 45 |
| US Billboard Hot 100 | 56 |
| US Hot Dance/Electronic Songs (Billboard) | 5 |
| US Dance Club Songs (Billboard) | 2 |
| US Pop Airplay (Billboard) | 17 |

=== Year-end charts ===
Year-end chart performance for "Red Lights"
| Chart (2014) | Position |
|---|---|
| Australia (ARIA) | 99 |
| Hungary (Rádiós Top 40) | 52 |
| Netherlands (Dutch Top 40) | 80 |
| Russia Airplay (TopHit) | 86 |
| Sweden (Sverigetopplistan) | 40 |
| Ukraine Airplay (TopHit) | 117 |
| US Dance Club Songs (Billboard) | 20 |
| US Hot Dance/Electronic Songs (Billboard) | 18 |

== Certifications ==
Certifications for "Red Lights"
| Region | Certification | Certified units/sales |
|---|---|---|
| Australia (ARIA) | Platinum | 70,000^{^} |
| Brazil (Pro-Música Brasil) | Platinum | 60,000^{‡} |
| Canada (Music Canada) | Gold | 40,000^{*} |
| Italy (FIMI) | Gold | 15,000^{‡} |
| New Zealand (RMNZ) | Gold | 15,000^{‡} |
| Sweden (GLF) | Gold | 20,000^{‡} |
| United Kingdom (BPI) | Gold | 400,000^{‡} |
| United States (RIAA) | Platinum | 1,000,000^{‡} |
Streaming
| Denmark (IFPI Danmark) | Gold | 1,300,000^{†} |
^{*} Sales figures based on certification alone.^{^} Shipments figures based on certification alone.^{‡} Sales+streaming figures based on certification alone.^{†} Streaming-only figures based on certification alone.

== Release history ==
Release dates and formats for "Red Lights"
| Region | Date | Format | Label(s) | Ref. |
|---|---|---|---|---|
| United States | 18 February 2014 | Mainstream airplay | Republic | |
