= Take Me (Tiësto song) =

Song by Dutch disc jockey

Single by Tiësto featuring Kyler England

from the album Club Life, Vol. 3 - Stockholm
- Released: 14 May 2013
- Genre: Progressive house
- Length: 3:32 (Radio Edit); 6:01 (Original Mix)
- Label: Musical Freedom; Spinnin'; PM:AM; Casablanca; Republic; Universal
- Songwriters: Tijs Verwest; Sjoerd Janssen; Wouter Janssen; Thomas Olsen; Kyler England
- Producers: Tiësto; Showtek; Tommy Trash

Tiësto singles chronology
"United" (2013)	"Take Me" (2013)	"Red Lights" (2013)

Kyler England singles chronology
"Stranger" (2012)	"Take Me" (2013)	"Summer of Love" (2013)

"Take Me" is a song by Dutch disc jockey and producer Tiësto with vocals from singer Kyler England. It was released on 14 May 2013 in the Netherlands. It is the second single from the Tiësto mixed compilation Club Life, Vol. 3 - Stockholm. The song is included in the deluxe version of the album A Town Called Paradise.

== Background and release ==
Tiësto declared about the song : "It's a combination of the old and the new Tiësto. It's housy but has this trancy vocal in it, and the melody is great. It's definitely the perfect definition of what I stand for at the moment — from the past until now."

== Music video ==
The music video was directed by Jeff Wash. It features the actresses Tamara Rey and Joyce Pickens. It is a lyric video showing a desert joyride in a car with the two girls.

== Track listing ==
Digital Download (MF049)

1. "Take Me" - 6:01

Digital Download / CD single
Europe (PM:AM)

1. "Take Me" (Radio Edit) - 3:32
2. "Take Me" (Extended Mix) - 6:01

US (Casablanca/Republic)

1. "Take Me" (Extended Mix) - 6:01
2. "Take Me" (Radio Edit) - 3:32

Digital Download

1. "Take Me" (Michael Brun Remix) - 5:53

Digital Download

1. "Take Me" (Nifra Remix) - 6:31

2017 7" Translucent Blue Vinyl

1. "Take Me" (Extended Mix) - 6:01
2. "Take Me" (Radio Edit) - 3:32

== Charts ==
=== Weekly charts ===
Weekly chart performance for "Take Me"
Chart (2013)	Peak position
Bulgaria (BAMP)	36
Belgium (Ultratip Bubbling Under Flanders)	43
Belgium Dance (Ultratop Flanders)	31
Belgium (Ultratip Bubbling Under Wallonia)	12
Belgium Dance (Ultratop Wallonia)	12
US Hot Dance/Electronic Songs (Billboard)	5

=== Year-end charts ===
Year-end chart performance for "Take Me"
Chart (2013)	Position
Ukraine Airplay (TopHit)	144
US Hot Dance/Electronic Songs (Billboard)	66
