= A Town Called Paradise =

Studio album by Tiësto
- Released: 13 June 2014
- Genre: Progressive house; electro house; dance-pop
- Length: 58:06
- Label: Musical Freedom; PM:AM; Casablanca; Republic; Universal
- Producer: John Amatiello; Dan Book; DBX; Disco Fries; Carl Falk; Firebeatz; Dean Gillard; Hardwell; Oscar Holter; Kaaze; Karl-Ola Kjellholm; Matthew Koma; Alexei Misoul; Matt Nash; Justin Prime; Showtek; Dave Silcox; Sultan + Ned Shepard; Tiësto; Matt Ward; Rami Yacoub

Tiësto chronology
Club Life, Vol. 3 - Stockholm (2013)	A Town Called Paradise (2014)	Club Life, Vol. 4 - New York City (2015)

Singles from A Town Called Paradise
- 1. "Pair of Dice" Released: 8 October 2012; 2. "Red Lights" Released: 13 December 2013; 3. "Wasted" Released: 25 April 2014; 4. "Let's Go" Released: 13 May 2014; 5. "Light Years Away" Released: 28 November 2014

A Town Called Paradise is the fifth studio album by Dutch DJ and record producer Tiësto, released on 13 June 2014 by Musical Freedom, PM:AM Recordings, and Universal Music. Five singles were released: "Pair of Dice", "Red Lights", "Wasted", "Let's Go" and "Light Years Away".

== Singles ==
"Pair of Dice" was released as the first single from the album on 8 October 2012. The composed appears in the album in a vocal version which features Krewella.

"Red Lights" was released as the lead single from the album on 13 December 2013. It was his first number one in Scotland, and peaked at number 6 on the UK Singles Chart. The song reached the top 10 in Australia, Denmark, Norway and Sweden.

"Wasted" was released as the third single from the album on 25 April 2014. The song peaked at number 3 on the UK Singles Chart, and reached the top 10 in Sweden.

"Let's Go" was released as the fourth single from the album on 13 May 2014. The song was featured in the films Night at the Museum: Secret of the Tomb, Pitch Perfect 2, Vacation, Sisters, in the TV shows Red Band Society, Hawaii Five-0, and in the teaser trailer for the 2018 animated film Teen Titans Go! To the Movies.

"Light Years Away" was released as the album's fifth single on 28 November 2014. The song features English group DBX. According to group member Pete Kirtley, the song is about "not giving up, even though the path ahead sometimes seems impossible and unreachable".

== Reception ==
=== Critical reception ===
Professional ratings
Aggregate scores
Source	Rating
Metacritic	51/100
Review scores
Source	Rating
AllMusic	3/5 stars
Los Angeles Times	2/4 stars
PopMatters	4/10
Rolling Stone	2.5/5 stars

Upon its release, A Town Called Paradise received mixed reviews from music critics. Christopher R. Weingarten of Rolling Stone gave the album a mixed review, stating, "EDM has changed pop, and now pop is changing veteran DJ Tiësto. He's moved from the abrasively chilly trance of 2009's Kaleidoscope to embrace pianos and guitars, a warm sound like the 4 a.m. version of Taylor Swift or Coldplay. He's a consummate crowd-pleaser, but he's best when he gets weird: The warped grind of "Echoes" is a standout; "Wasted" might be one of 2014's best country songs."

Starting in 2015, the songs Footprints, Rocky, and Red Lights are featured as one of the shows for the Fountains of Bellagio.

=== Commercial performance ===
On 19 June 2014, the album entered the Irish Albums Chart at number 22. The album entered the New Zealand Albums Chart at number 39. On 22 June 2014, the album debuted at number 22 on the UK Albums Chart. The album debuted at number 18 on the Billboard 200 chart and number 2 on the Billboard Dance/Electronic Albums chart. It opened in the United States with first week sales of 15,013.

== Track listing ==
Standard version
No.	Title	Writer(s)	Producer(s)	Length
1.	"Red Lights" (featuring Michel Zitron)	Tijs Verwest; Carl Falk; Rami Yacoub; Wayne Hector; Michel Zitron; Måns Wredenberg	Tiësto; Yacoub; Falk; John Amatiello^{[a]}; Dean Gillard^{[a]}; Matt Ward^{[a]}	4:22
2.	"Footprints" (featuring Cruickshank)	Verwest; Brandon Lowry; Freddy Wexler; Josef Cruickshank; Justin Prime; Ash Pournouri	Tiësto; Prime	4:17
3.	"Light Years Away" (featuring DBX)	Pete Kirtley; Sacha Collisson; John James Newman; Verwest	Tiësto; DBX; Matt Nash; Dave Silcox	3:43
4.	"A Town Called Paradise" (featuring Zac Barnett of American Authors)	Matthew Koma; Verwest	Tiësto; Koma; Oscar Holter^{[a]}; Karl-Ola Kjellholm^{[a]}; Dan Book^{[c]}	4:09
5.	"Written in Reverse" (with Hardwell featuring Matthew Koma)	Koma; Verwest; Ron Aniello; Robbert van de Corput	Tiësto; Koma; Hardwell; Book^{[c]}	4:28
6.	"Echoes" (featuring Andreas Moe)	Verwest; Nash; Silcox; Moe; Hiten Bharadia	Tiësto; Nash; Silcox	4:59
7.	"Last Train" (with Firebeatz featuring Ladyhawke)	Verwest; Jurre van Doeselaar; Tim Benjamin Smulders; Phillipa Margret Brown	Tiësto; Firebeatz	4:48
8.	"Wasted" (featuring Matthew Koma)	Koma; Verwest; Nick Audino; Lewis Hughes	Tiësto; Koma; Disco Fries; Twice as Nice	3:10
9.	"Let's Go" (featuring Icona Pop)	Verwest; Holter; Aino Jawo; Caroline Hjelt; Marcus Sepehrmanesh; Alx Reuterskiöld	Tiësto; Holter	3:22
10.	"The Feeling" (featuring Ou Est le Swimming Pool)	Verwest; Charles Haddon; Anders Källmark; S. Janssen; W. Janssen	Tiësto; Showtek	4:45
11.	"Shimmer" (featuring Christian Burns)	Verwest; Burns; Nicholas Ditri; Daniel Boselovic; Jonnie "Most" Davis; Paris Hampton	Tiësto; Disco Fries	3:32
12.	"Rocky" (with Kaaze)	Verwest; Mick Kastenholt; Simon Gain	Tiësto; Kaaze	3:32
13.	"Close to Me" (with Sultan + Shepard featuring Quilla)	Verwest; Ossama Al Sarraf; Ned Shepard; Anna Luisa Daigneault	Tiësto; Sultan + Shepard	4:20
14.	"Set Yourself Free" (featuring Krewella)	Verwest; S. Janssen; W. Janssen; Koma; Jahan Yousaf; Yasmine Yousaf; Kris Trindl	Tiësto; Koma^{[b]}; Book^{[c]}; Alexei Misoul^{[c]}	4:39

Deluxe version additional tracks
No.	Title	Writer(s)	Producer(s)	Length
15.	"Don't Hide Your Light" (with MOTi featuring Denny White)	Verwest; White; Timo Romme	Tiësto; MOTi	3:15
16.	"Calling on Angels" (with Fred Falke featuring Elan Lea)	Verwest; Lea; Andrew Murray; Frédérick Falke	Tiësto; Fred Falke	3:16
17.	"Can't Forget" (with Dzeko & Torres)	Verwest; Julian Dzeko; Luis Torres; Redhead Kingpin	Tiësto; Dzeko & Torres	4:10
18.	"Take Me" (featuring Kyler England)	Verwest; England; W. Janssen; S. Janssen; Thomas Olsen	Tiësto; Tommy Trash; Showtek; Richard Furch^{[b]}	3:48

Notes

- ^{^[a]} signifies an additional producer.
- ^{^[b]} signifies a vocal producer.
- ^{^[c]} signifies an additional vocal producer.

== Personnel ==
- Aaron Accetta – vocal engineer
- John Amatiello – additional production
- Ron Aniello – composer
- N. Audino – composer
- Zac Barnett – featured artist, vocals
- Hiten Bharadia – composer
- Gavin Bond – photography
- Dan Book – engineer, vocal producer, vocals
- Danny Boselovic – composer, piano
- Delbert Bowers – assistant
- Phillipa Brown – composer
- Christian Burns – composer, featured artist, vocals
- Simon Christianssen – engineer, mixing
- Sacha Collisson – composer, engineer, guitar, synthesizer
- Cruickshank – featured artist, vocals
- Josef Cruickshank – composer
- Christian Cummings – engineer
- Anna Luisa Daigneault – composer
- John Davis – mastering engineer
- Jonnie Davis "Most" – composer
- DBX – featured artist, producer
- Disco Fries – engineer, producer, programming
- Nicholas Ditri – composer, piano
- Tommy English – vocal engineer
- Carl Falk – composer, engineer, guitar, instrumentation, producer, programming, vocal arrangement
- Firebeatz – engineer, featured artist, mixing, primary artist, producer
- Simon Gain – composer
- Chris Galland – assistant
- Mike Gaydusek – vocal engineer
- Dean Gillard – additional production, instrumentation, mixing, programming, vocal mixing
- Shep Goodman – vocal engineer
- Charles Haddon – composer, engineer, Rhodes piano, vocals
- Paris Hampton – composer
- Hardwell (Robbert van de Corput) – engineer, featured artist, mixing, primary artist, producer, composer
- Stuart Hawkes – mastering engineer
- Patrick Heaney – engineer
- Wayne Hector – composer
- Caroline Hjeit – composer
- Oscar Holter – additional production, composer, drums, engineer, guitar, piano, producer
- Lewis Hughes – composer
- Icona Pop – featured artist, vocals
- Sjoerd Janssen – composer, mixing, producer, programming
- Wouter Janssen – composer, mixing, producer, programming
- Aino Jawo – composer
- KAAZE (Mick Kastenholt) – featured artist, primary artist, producer, composer, programming
- Anders Kallmark – composer, drums, engineer, piano
- Pete Kirtley – composer, engineer, piano, strings
- Karl-Ola S. Kjellholm – additional production, engineer, guitar
- Matthew Koma – bass, composer, engineer, featured artist, guitar, mixing, producer, programming, vocal engineer, vocal producer, vocals
- Krewella – featured artist, vocals
- Ladyhawke – featured artist, vocals
- Brandon Lowry – composer
- Jordan Loyd – photography
- Manny Marroquin – mixing
- Alexei Misoul – engineer, vocal producer, vocals
- Andreas Moe – composer, featured artist, vocals
- Matt Nash – composer, drums, engineer, guitar, piano, producer, synthesizer
- John James Newman – composer, vocals
- Ou Est le Swimming Pool – featured artist
- Ash Pournouri – composer
- Justin Prime – composer, producer
- Quilla – featured artist, vocals
- Eva Reistad – assistant engineer
- Alx Reuterskiöld – composer
- James Reynolds – mixing
- Ossama Al Sarraf – composer, guitar
- Markus Sepehrmanesh – composer
- Ned Shepard – composer, drums, engineer, featured artist, mixing, piano, producer
- Dave Silcox – composer, drums, engineer, producer, synthesizer
- Tim Smulders – composer
- Nick Steinhardt – design
- Sultan – drums, engineer, featured artist, mixing, producer
- Sultan + Ned Shepard – primary artist
- Tiësto (Tijs Verwest) – engineer, mixing, primary artist, producer, composer
- Kristopher Trindl – composer
- Twice as Nice – programming
- Jurre Van Doeselaar – composer
- Matt Ward – additional production, instrumentation, mixing, programming, vocal mixing
- Freddy Wexler – composer
- Måns Wredenberg – composer
- Rami Yacoub – composer, engineer, instrumentation, producer, programming, vocal arrangement, vocal editing
- Jahan Yousaf – composer
- Yasmine Yousaf – composer
- Michel Zitron – composer, vocals

Credits adapted from AllMusic.

== Charts ==
=== Weekly charts ===
Weekly chart performance for A Town Called Paradise
Chart (2014)	Peak position
Australian Albums (ARIA)	18
Austrian Albums (Ö3 Austria)	22
Belgian Albums (Ultratop Flanders)	26
Belgian Albums (Ultratop Wallonia)	15
Canadian Albums (Billboard)	9
Czech Albums (ČNS IFPI)	46
Danish Albums (Hitlisten)	33
Dutch Albums (Album Top 100)	11
Finnish Albums (Suomen virallinen lista)	34
French Albums (SNEP)	80
German Albums (Offizielle Top 100)	45
Irish Albums (IRMA)	22
Italian Albums (FIMI)	88
New Zealand Albums (RMNZ)	39
Norwegian Albums (VG-lista)	14
Scottish Albums (OCC)	9
Spanish Albums (Promusicae)	82
Swedish Albums (Sverigetopplistan)	15
Swiss Albums (Schweizer Hitparade)	12
UK Albums (OCC)	22
UK Dance Albums (OCC)	3
US Billboard 200	18
US Top Dance Albums (Billboard)	2

=== Year-end charts ===
Year-end chart performance for A Town Called Paradise
Chart (2014)	Position
Swedish Albums (Sverigetopplistan)	98
US Top Dance/Electronic Albums (Billboard)	20

== Certifications ==
Certifications for A Town Called Paradise
Region	Certification	Certified units/sales
Sweden (GLF)	Gold	20,000^{‡}
^{‡} Sales+streaming figures based on certification alone.

== Release history ==
Release dates and formats for A Town Called Paradise
Region	Date	Format	Label
Netherlands	13 June 2014	CD; digital download	Musical Freedom; PM:AM; Universal
United States	16 June 2014	CD; digital download	Musical Freedom; Casablanca; Republic
