= Wasted (Tiësto song) =

Single by Tiësto featuring Matthew Koma

from the album A Town Called Paradise
- Released: 25 April 2014
- Recorded: 2013
- Genre: Electro house; dance-pop
- Length: 3:09
- Label: Musical Freedom; PM:AM; Casablanca; Republic; Universal
- Songwriters: Tijs Verwest; Matthew Koma; Twice as Nice
- Producers: Tiësto; Twice as Nice; The Disco Fries

Tiësto singles chronology
"Red Lights" (2013)	"Wasted" (2014)	"Let's Go" (2014)

Matthew Koma singles chronology
"Find You" (2014)	"Wasted" (2014)	"Cheap Sunglasses" (2014)

Music video
- "Wasted" on YouTube

"Wasted" is a song by Dutch DJ and record producer Tiësto featuring Matthew Koma, who co-wrote the song with Tiësto and Australian production and songwriting duo Twice as Nice. "Wasted" was first released on 25 April 2014 by PM:AM Recordings as the second single from Tiësto's fifth studio album, A Town Called Paradise. It was featured in the 2014 action comedy film 22 Jump Street.

== Background and release ==
The song was announced by Tiësto in early April. A lyric video for the track was later uploaded to the artist's YouTube channel on 13 April 2014.

British radio station BBC Radio 1 opted to play an alternative version of the song titled "Naked", which replaced every occurrence of the term "wasted" with "naked".

== Music video ==
The song's accompanying music video was released on 25 April 2014 and directed by Tabitha Denholm.

The video features six women (Taylor Godfrey, Allegra Carpenter, Kassi Smith...) in 1960s-era outfits enjoying themselves. Tiësto and Matthew Koma are seen starring on a TV show called The Tiësto Show where Koma is also seen singing the song.

== Track listing ==
Digital download

No.	Title	Length
1.	"Wasted"	3:09
2.	"Wasted" (Ummet Ozcan Remix)	4:17

Remixes

No.	Title	Length
1.	"Wasted" (TST Remix)	4:35
2.	"Wasted" (Ummet Ozcan Remix)	5:55
3.	"Wasted" (R3hab Remix)	4:12
4.	"Wasted" (Mike Mago Remix)	5:58

Yellow Claw Remix (SoundCloud)

No.	Title	Length
1.	"Wasted" (Yellow Claw Remix)	3:11
2.	"Wasted" (Yellow Claw Remix) (clean version)	3:11

== Credits and personnel ==
- Songwriting – Tijs Verwest, Matthew Koma, Twice as Nice
- Production – Tiësto, Twice as Nice, Disco Fries
- Vocals – Matthew Koma

== Chart performance ==
In the United Kingdom, it became the first single which was released in 2014, to top the UK Dance Chart without topping the UK Singles Chart. As of 1 August 2014, "Wasted" was certified Silver (200,000 copies) in the United Kingdom and as of 15 June 2015, "Wasted" was certified Platinum (1,000,000 copies) in the United States.

== Charts ==
=== Weekly charts ===
Chart (2014)	Peak position
Australia (ARIA)	44
Austria (Ö3 Austria Top 40)	42
Belgium (Ultratip Bubbling Under Flanders)	46
Belgium (Ultratip Bubbling Under Wallonia)	22
Canada Hot 100 (Billboard)	37
Czech Republic Airplay (ČNS IFPI)	82
Czech Republic Singles Digital (ČNS IFPI)	4
Finland (Suomen virallinen lista)	11
France (SNEP)	82
Germany (GfK)	49
Ireland (IRMA)	13
Mexico Airplay (Billboard)	24
Netherlands (Dutch Top 40)	9
Netherlands (Single Top 100)	15
Norway (VG-lista)	19
Scottish Singles Sales (Official Charts)	2
Slovakia Singles Digital (ČNS IFPI)	7
Slovenia (SloTop50)	40
Spain (Promusicae)	45
Sweden (Sverigetopplistan)	5
UK Singles (Official Charts)	3
UK Dance (Official Charts)	1
US Billboard Hot 100	49
US Hot Dance/Electronic Songs (Billboard)	5
US Dance Club Songs (Billboard)	17
US Pop Airplay (Billboard)	21

=== Year-end charts ===
Chart (2014)	Position
Netherlands (Dutch Top 40)	33
Netherlands (Single Top 100)	53
Sweden (Sverigetopplistan)	34
UK Singles (Official Charts Company)	73
US Hot Dance/Electronic Songs (Billboard)	16

== Certifications ==
Region	Certification	Certified units/sales
Brazil (Pro-Música Brasil)	Gold	30,000^{‡}
Canada (Music Canada)	Gold	40,000^{*}
Italy (FIMI)	Gold	15,000^{‡}
New Zealand (RMNZ)	Gold	7,500^{*}
Spain (Promusicae)	Gold	20,000^{‡}
United Kingdom (BPI)	Platinum	600,000^{‡}
United States (RIAA)	Platinum	1,000,000^{‡}
Streaming
Denmark (IFPI Danmark)	Platinum	2,600,000^{†}
Spain (Promusicae)	Gold	4,000,000^{†}
^{*} Sales figures based on certification alone.^{‡} Sales+streaming figures based on certification alone.^{†} Streaming-only figures based on certification alone.

== Release history ==
Region	Date	Format	Label
Various	25 April 2014	Digital download	PM:AM
Austria	30 May 2014	Digital download	PM:AM
Germany	30 May 2014	Digital download	PM:AM
Switzerland	30 May 2014	Digital download	PM:AM
United Kingdom	8 June 2014	Digital download	PM:AM
United States	17 June 2014	Contemporary hit radio	Casablanca; Republic
United States	17 June 2014	Rhythmic contemporary	Casablanca; Republic
