= Club Life, Vol. 3 - Stockholm =

Compilation album by Tiësto
- Released: 18 June 2013
- Genre: Progressive house; electro house; big room house
- Length: 1:34:58
- Label: Musical Freedom; Spinnin'
- Producer: Tiësto; Dyro; Baggi Begovic; Hardwell; Mark Alston; Jason Taylor; Zedd; Calvin Harris; Moguai; Alesso; Pelari; Moska; DJ Punish; MOTi; Quintino; ALVARO

Tiësto chronology
Club Life, Vol. 2 - Miami (2012)	Club Life, Vol. 3 - Stockholm (2013)	A Town Called Paradise (2014)

Singles from Club Life, Vol. 3 - Stockholm
- 1. "United" Released: 5 February 2013; 2. "Take Me" Released: 14 May 2013; 3. "Paradise" Released: 11 June 2013; 4. "Back to the Acid" Released: 11 June 2013; 5. "Shocker" Released: 11 June 2013; 6. "Love and Run" Released: 16 July 2013

Club Life, Vol. 3 - Stockholm is a mixed compilation album by Dutch DJ/producer Tiësto. It is the third installment of his Club Life compilation series.

== Track listing ==
No.	Title	Artist(s)	Length
1.	"Paradise"	Tiësto and Dyro	5:29
2.	"Take Me" (featuring Kyler England)	Tiësto	6:01
3.	"Compromise" (featuring Tab)	Baggi Begovic	5:49
4.	"Apollo" (featuring Amba Shepherd) (Hardwell's Club Life Edit)	Hardwell	5:04
5.	"Love and Run" (featuring Teddy Geiger)	Tiësto, Mark Alston, Baggi Begovic and Jason Taylor	6:41
6.	"Clarity" (featuring Foxes) (Tiësto Remix)	Zedd	5:53
7.	"Sweet Nothing" (featuring Florence Welch) (Tiësto & Ken Loi Re-Remix)	Calvin Harris	5:16
8.	"I Love It" (Tiësto's Club Life Remix)	Icona Pop	5:10
9.	"Carried Away" (Tiësto Remix)	Passion Pit	4:47
10.	"Champs"	MOGUAI	5:30
11.	"If I Lose Myself"	Alesso vs. OneRepublic	6:51
12.	"Cango"	Pelari	6:04
13.	"Century" (Tiësto & MOSKA Remix)	Tiësto and Calvin Harris	7:39
14.	"Shocker"	Tiësto and DJ Punish	6:50
15.	"Back to the Acid"	Tiësto and MOTi	5:02
16.	"United" (Tiësto & Blasterjaxx Remix)	Tiësto, Quintino and ALVARO	6:52

Digital download bonus track
No.	Title	Length
1.	"Club Life: Stockholm" (Continuous DJ Mix)	1:16:01
Total length:		2:50:59

== Charts ==
=== Weekly charts ===
Chart (2013)	Peak; position
Austrian Albums (Ö3 Austria)	69
Belgian Compilations (Ultratop Flanders)	14
Belgian Compilations (Ultratop Wallonia)	3
Canadian Albums (Billboard)	11
Danish Albums (Hitlisten)	36
Dutch Compilations (MegaCharts)	9
UK Compilation Albums (OCC)	25
UK Dance Albums (OCC)	10
UK Album Downloads (OCC)	40
US Billboard 200	41
US Top Dance/Electronic Albums (Billboard)	2
US Digital Albums (Billboard)	19
US Independent Albums (Billboard)	11

=== Year-end charts ===
Chart (2013)	Position
US Top Dance/Electronic Albums (Billboard)	25
