= United (Tiësto, Quintino and Alvaro composition) =

Single by Tiësto, Quintino and ALVARO

from the album Club Life, Vol. 3 - Stockholm
- Released: 5 February 2013
- Genre: Electro house
- Length: 6:22
- Label: Musical Freedom; Ultra
- Songwriters: Tijs Verwest; Quinten van den Berg; Jasper Helderman
- Producers: Tiësto; Quintino; ALVARO

Tiësto singles chronology
"Pair of Dice" (2012)	"United" (2013)	"Take Me" (2013)

Quintino singles chronology
"Circuits" (2012)	"United" (2013)	"Chasing Summers" (2013)

ALVARO singles chronology
"Rock Music" (2013)	"United" (2013)	"World In Our Hands" (2013)

"United" is an instrumental composition by Dutch disc jockeys and producers Tiësto, Quintino and ALVARO. It was released on 5 February 2013 in the United States. It was the official anthem for the 2013 edition of Ultra Music Festival in Miami. It is the first single from the Tiësto mixed compilation Club Life, Vol. 3 - Stockholm which includes a remixed version of the composition by Tiësto and Blasterjaxx.

== Track listing ==
Digital Download (UL3845)

1. "United" (Ultra Music Festival Anthem) - 6:22

Digital Download (UL4042)

1. "United" (Ultra Music Festival Anthem) (Tiësto & Blasterjaxx Remix) - 6:52

Digital Download (UL4494)

1. "United" (Ultra Music Festival Anthem) (Revero Remix) - 7:01

== Charts ==
Chart (2013)	Peak position
US Hot Dance/Electronic Songs (Billboard)	36
