= Forbidden Paradise 4: High as a Kite =

Compilation album by DJ Tiësto
- Released: December 11, 1995 (Netherlands)
- Recorded: 1995
- Genre: Trance
- Length: 66:30
- Label: Guardian Angel
- Producer: Tiësto

DJ Tiësto chronology
Forbidden Paradise 3: The Quest for Atlantis (1995)	Forbidden Paradise 4: High as a Kite (1995)	Forbidden Paradise 5: Arctic Expedition (1996)

Professional ratings
Review scores
Source	Rating
Allmusic	2.5/5 stars

Forbidden Paradise 4: High as a Kite is the fourth album in the Forbidden Paradise series. It is the second album in the series to be mixed by well-known trance DJ/producer Tiësto. As with the rest of the Forbidden Paradise series, the album is a live turntable mix.

== Track listing ==
1. Plankton - "Sunrise Acid" – 4:55
2. Endlos - "Endlos" – 3:02
3. Blue Minds - "Troubleshooter" – 2:34
4. Groove Park - "Hit The Bang" – 4:40
5. Quench - "Dreams" – 3:37
6. Nail - "I Am Them" [Accelerator Remix] – 5:01
7. Emmanuel Top - "Tone" – 4:13
8. Axial Force - "Structures" – 1:25
9. Razors Edge - "Tribal Sunrise" [Dancefloor NRG Mix] – 6:04
10. Humate - "3.1" – 5:10
11. Bassline Baby - "Silverfish" – 3:42
12. Toja - "The Home Of The Big Beat" – 3:28
13. Dr. Fernando - "High Pressure" – 2:54
14. Cortex Thrill - "Euphoria" – 5:01
15. Aura - "Planet-S" – 2:25
16. Fast Trac - "Inertia" – 3:58
17. Blue Ocean - "Brightness" – 4:13
