= Twoloud =

German DJ musical project

TWOLOUD
- Origin: Germany
- Genres: Progressive house; big room house; bassline
- Years active: 2013–present
- Labels: Spinnin' Records, Playbox Music, Revealed Recordings, of whom Mainstage Music, Skink, Dim Mak Records
- Members: Manuel Reuter; Alexander Thomas; Dennis Nicholls

Twoloud, formerly stylized as twoloud, now stylized as TWOLOUD, is a German musical project consisting of members Manuel Reuter (also known as DJ Manian), Alexander Thomas (a.k.a. Alex Castle) along with Dennis Nicholls (a.k.a. D-Style). The act was founded in 2013 and is active mainly in the genres of progressive house and big room house, which are some of the house music subgenres. Although the project's anonymity has been revealed in mid-2014, the musicians were asking to be judged only by their music, not faces.

The style of TWOLOUD is unique, with the lead sound of the song "Greatest DJ", for example, being strongly linked to that of duo Showtek. Similar comparisons were given to the songs "Drop It Like This", which contains influences by DJ Tujamo, and "I'm Alive" resembling the sound of Canadian duo DVBBS. Their debut song "Big Bang" has a sound connected to DJ Martin Garrix.

For a long time, members of TWOLOUD remained anonymous. In their live performances they appeared in ninja costumes and on their album covers they had never been seen. For a long time TWOLOUD was suspected to be a joint project of the Dutch DJs Hardwell and Tiësto. Their anonymity was an advantage to lesser-known artists, who would often announce that they were TWOLOUD. However, in mid-2014, it was announced that TWOLOUD was a project of the two German DJs Manian and D-Style. This was due to pictures the duo was on and the fact that they were credited on their songs.

== Personnel ==
Logo

Current members

- Manian (Manuel Reuter) - DJ, producer
- Alex Castle (Alexander Thomas) - songwriter, producer
- D-Style (Dennis Nicholls) - DJ, producer

== Singles ==
2013:

- twoloud - Big Bang
- twoloud - Traffic (Tiësto Edit)

2014:

- twoloud - Track One [Free Download]
- twoloud vs. Julian Jordan - Rockin
- TST & twoloud - Drop It Like This
- twoloud vs Danny Avila - Rock the Place
- twoloud - Greatest DJ
- twoloud - I'm Alive
- twoloud - Twisted
- twoloud - Track Two [Free Download]
- twoloud - Track Three [Free Download]
- twoloud featuring Christian Burns - We Are the Ones
- Deniz Koyu vs twoloud - Goin Down
- twoloud featuring Will Brennan - Get Down

2015:

- twoloud - The Biz
- twoloud - Outside World
- Sonic One vs twoloud - The Drums
- twoloud - Right Now
- twoloud & Kaaze - Color Pop
- twoloud - Move (Showtek Edit)
- twoloud - Higher Off the Ground
- twoloud vs Mojjjo and Mind'CD - Objectif
- twoloud & Qulinez - Perfection
- twoloud & Bounce Inc. - Hope
- twoloud & Kaaze - Maji
- twoloud & Konih - One More

2016:

- twoloud & Cranksters - Work It
- TWOLOUD - Affected
- TWOLOUD - Boston
- TWOLOUD & FRDY - Fix Me (Official PAROOKAVILLE Anthem 2016)
- Laidback Luke & TWOLOUD - Fcukin Beats
- TWOLOUD - My Remedy (Official Untold Festival Anthem)
- TWOLOUD & Bounce Inc - Ain't Talkin' Bout Love
- TWOLOUD & Konih - Gimme Some More
- MORTEN & TWOLOUD - Certified

2017:

- TWOLOUD & MureKian - Free
- TWOLOUD x DJ KUBA & NEITAN - Mirror On The Wall
- TWOLOUD & Bounce Inc. vs. Daav One - Bonkers
- TWOLOUD & Mairee - What You Got
- TWOLOUD - Flipflops

2018:

- Twoloud & Kyanu - Six Beats
- Twoloud - All About That Bass
- Twoloud & Haechi - Give Up
- Twoloud - Discofans
- Twoloud & Stupid Goldfish - Elepfunk

2019:

- Twoloud & Nuki - Double Double
- Twoloud, Lo'did and Jenil - Bad Boy Flow
- Twoloud & JustLuke - Be The One
- Twoloud - Keep It Warm

2020

- Twoloud - Bust It
- Twoloud - Sweaty Hands

=== Remixes ===
2013:

- Binary Finary - 1998
- Plastik Funk - Let Me See Ya
- Galantis - You (with Tiësto)
- Afrojack featuring Spree Wilson - The Spark (with Tiësto)
- Linkin Park x Steve Aoki - A Light That Never Comes

2014:

- Hardwell featuring Matthew Koma - Dare You (with Tiësto)
- Showtek - We Like to Party
- Tiësto - Red Lights
- The Chainsmokers featuring sirenXX - Kanye (with Steve Aoki)
- Nervo & Ivan Gough featuring Beverley Knight - Not Taking This No More
- David Guetta & Showtek featuring Vassy - Bad
- Calvin Harris - Summer
- Afrojack - Ten Feet Tall
- Rank 1 - Airwave
- Tiësto & Hardwell - Zero 76
- Seven Lions featuring Ellie Goulding - Don't Leave (with Tiësto)

2015:

- Dirty Rush & Gregor Es - Pressure (twoloud Edit)
- Lars Pager & Derek Hake - Onyx (twoloud Edit)
- Dotan - Home (with Tiësto)
- Fragma - Toca Me
- Hotlife and Tomo Hirata featuring Johnny Rose - One Last Time (Sofia to Tokyo Edit)
- Zedd featuring Jon Bellion - Beautiful Now
- Cosmo & Skoro - Bingo (twoloud Edit)
- Showtek featuring Vassy - Satisfied

2016:

- DJ Kuba and Neitan - ROCK! (twoloud Edit)
- Sonic One - Punk! (twoloud Edit)
- Denine - Keep on Lovin
- Tim3bomb - Get Money
- Niels Van Gogh - Dope
- Sonic One - We Rock This Club (TWOLOUD Edit)
- Jean Beatz and Jegers - Front2Back (TWOLOUD Edit)

2017:

- Green Ketchup - Bubble
- Laidback Luke x Konih - Like This
