= 5 Seconds Before Sunrise =

Single by VER:WEST
- Released: 17 July 2020
- Genre: Melodic house
- Length: 4:35; 7:23 (Extended Mix)
- Label: AFTR:HRS; Musical Freedom; Spinnin'
- Songwriters: Tijs Verwest; Dave Whelan; Mike Di Scola
- Producers: VER:WEST; CamelPhat

VER:WEST singles chronology
"5 Seconds Before Sunrise" (2020)	"Elements of a New Life" (2021)

"5 Seconds Before Sunrise" is an instrumental composition by Dutch disc jockey and producer Tiësto under his alias VER:WEST. It was released on 17 July 2020 in the Netherlands.

== Background and release ==
The composition was premiered at Tomorrowland 2020 during an exclusive VER:WEST one hour set. The title is a reference to his previous 2007 composition, "Ten Seconds Before Sunrise". Tiësto declared about the song : "I would describe VER:WEST as melodic house music. It’s a lot deeper and more chill and a very different energy than Tiësto. I got this opportunity from Tomorrowland to express a different side of me, which I've never done before. I know they are going to put amazing visuals around it and make it look really different and cool. Expect the unexpected, it's going to look amazing!"

== Track listing ==
Digital download (AH77)

1. "5 Seconds Before Sunrise" - 4:35

Digital download (AH77)

1. "5 Seconds Before Sunrise" (Extended Mix) – 7:23

== Charts ==
Chart performance for "5 Seconds Before Sunrise"
Chart (2020)	Peak position
Belgium Dance (Ultratop Flanders)	18
