= Forbidden Paradise 3: The Quest for Atlantis =

1995 album in the Forbidden Paradise series

Compilation album by DJ Tiësto
- Released: July 31, 1995 (Netherlands)
- Recorded: 1995
- Genre: Trance
- Length: 76:19
- Label: Guardian Angel
- Producer: Tiësto

DJ Tiësto chronology
Forbidden Paradise 2: The Beauty and the Beat (1994)	Forbidden Paradise 3: The Quest for Atlantis (1995)	Forbidden Paradise 4: High as a Kite (1995)

Forbidden Paradise 3: The Quest for Atlantis is the third album in the Forbidden Paradise series. It is the first album in the series to be mixed by well-known trance DJ/producer Tiësto. As with the rest of the Forbidden Paradise series, the album is a live turntable mix.

== Track listing ==
No.	Title	Artist	Length
1.	"Bird Of Dawning"	Cyberheads	3:43
2.	"Summer Storm [Leisure Lounge Edit]"	PHD	5:07
3.	"Eclipse"	Cherry Bomb	6:23
4.	"Aquapunch [3 In One Mix]"	Blue Minds	3:11
5.	"Silver Clouds In A Yellow Sky"	Alici	5:13
6.	"Energy Transpose"	Aura	4:24
7.	"The Club"	Digital Express	3:48
8.	"Access"	DJ Misjah & DJ Tim	4:15
9.	"Calling Middle Earth"	Dynamic Maniax	4:15
10.	"Amanita Muscaria"	Azid Force	5:23
11.	"Anaesthetic Influx"	Encephaloid Disturbance	4:21
12.	"Porpoise"	West & Storm	6:00
13.	"Deep Infinity"	Cortex Thrill	4:19
14.	"Impulse Are NRG [Maurits NRG Trance Mix]"	Karma De La Luna	5:46
15.	"A Force Beyond"	Juno	4:50
16.	"Berlin [Peace Mix]"	Berlin Inc.	2:26
17.	"Trip To Heaven"	T-Scanner	2:58
Total length:			76:19
