= Last Train (Tiësto and Firebeatz song) =

Song by Tiësto and Firebeatz featuring Ladyhawke

from the album A Town Called Paradise
- Released: 13 June 2014
- Genre: Progressive house; dance-pop
- Length: 4:39
- Label: Musical Freedom; PM:AM; Casablanca; Republic; Universal
- Songwriters: Tijs Verwest; Tim Benjamin Smulders; Jurre van Doeselaar; Phillipa Margaret Brown
- Producers: Tiësto; Firebeatz

"Last Train" is a song by Dutch disc jockey and producer Tiësto and Dutch disc jockeys and production band Firebeatz. It features vocals from New Zealand singer and songwriter Ladyhawke. The song was included in Tiësto's fifth studio album, A Town Called Paradise, released on 13 June 2014.

== Background ==
Tiësto declared about the song : "'Last Train' is one of my favorite tracks of the album. So I really love Ladyhawke and I am so happy that she wanted to work with me on this track. This track I wrote with two talented producers from Holland called Firebeatz. We got the single that is really perfect. 'You are on the last train home again' – I think it is a really special concept. You know, it’s all night partying and you go on the last train back. I think it is about all things that happen at night. Yeah, it’s a really cool track!"

== Track listing ==
Digital download / CD (from A Town Called Paradise album)

1. "Last Train" – 4:48

== Charts ==
Chart (2014)	Peak position
US Hot Dance/Electronic Songs (Billboard)	35
