= Quilla (musician) =

Coordinates: 44.886976°N 123.032987°W

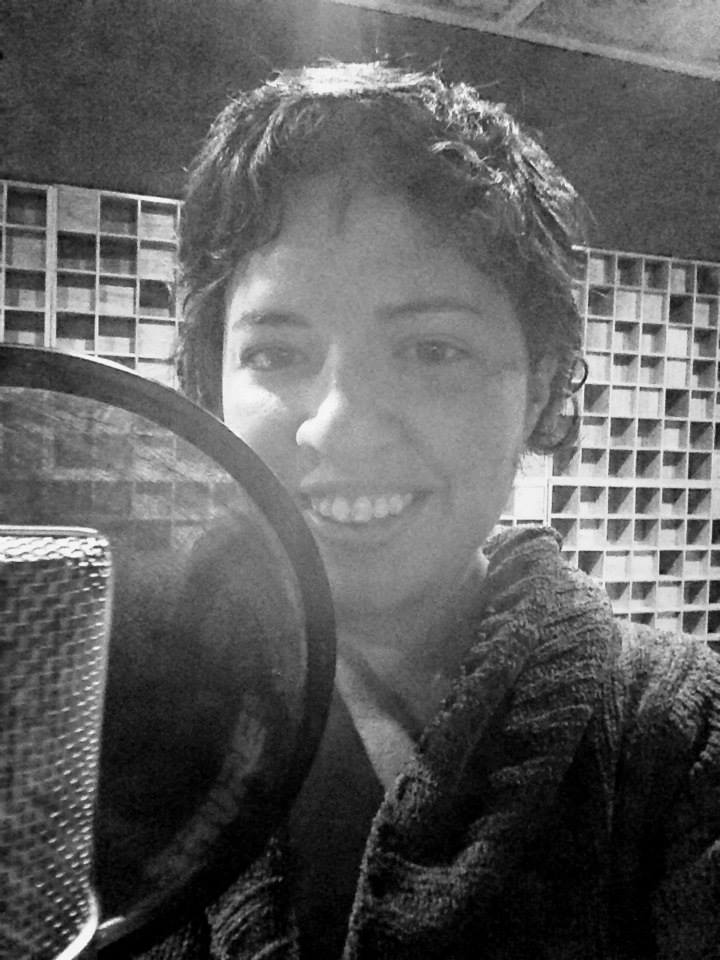

Background information
- Also known as: Quilla
- Born: Anna Luisa Daigneault; December 1, 1982 (age 43); Montreal, Quebec, Canada
- Genres: Electronic pop, House, Progressive house, Deep House, Techno, Pop, Experimental Music, Folktronica
- Occupations: songwriter, producer, vocalist, keyboardist
- Instruments: keyboards, thumb piano (mbira), vocal looper
- Years active: 2006 – present
- Labels: Armada Music, Revealed Recordings, Visionquest, Ritual Fire Records, Neon Records, Ministry of Sound Australia, Universal Music, Vicious, Black Hole, Ministry of Sound South Africa, Haunted Clockwork Records

Anna Luisa Daigneault (born December 1, 1982), known by her stage name Quilla, is a Canadian musician and member of the electronic folk band The Queen Bees. She was born and raised in Montreal, Quebec.

Daigneault is known for her contributions as a dance music vocalist in the genres of progressive house, deep house, techno, trance, breaks, and others.

Daigneault has composed and produced theme songs for podcasts.

== Research and influences ==
As a student at McGill University, Daigneault studied anthropology and linguistics, and trained as a student archaeologist in Belize and Cambodia. As a graduate student in anthropology at Université de Montréal, Daigneault focused her attention on the endangered languages and vocal traditions of South America. She was a field assistant for National Geographic’s Enduring Voices Project. Her research background has strongly influenced the cultural content and otherworldly themes explored in her music.

== Lyrics and Style ==
She explores positive themes in her lyrics, such as healing, dealing with regret and loss, breaking through obstacles and learning to love oneself. In an interview with Neon Vision, Daigneault observed; "When I see my friends and family going through experiences in life, I try to take those emotions and channel them into meaningful lyrics for people so when they are on the dance floor, they have an emotional catharsis – that’s my goal."

== Solo Work ==
Writer Jackie Roy observed, "There is a lot of anticipation to see what Quilla comes up with next, as a pleasant surprise is always expected with her knack for collaborating so many different styles and genres." Editors at Flush Magazine wrote, "Quilla is a multi-talented, multifaceted, hyper literate singer-songstress offering a fresh perspective, fascinating imagery, and songs befitting of the album title.”

Daigneault's second albumYou Got It was released in April 2017 and also garnered positive reviews from dance music blogs We Rave You, as well as I Want EDM. "Kicking off with eerie drum-work, the listener is met with her spellbinding and ethereal voice – one that soothes the senses like silk would. Exciting more emotions in the listener, Quilla carries off the track well with her pitch perfect adeptness behind both, the microphone as well as the production desk." "This last year [Quilla] has been hard at work producing her new album ‘You Got It’, and it does not disappoint. The slick, varied productions alongside beautiful, poetic vocal forms a hybrid genre which Quilla has created. The influences of the producers she has worked with and her dance music background are evident, but her ability to transcend genres and tie all the brilliant intricacies of her production together is majestic."

She released her third studio album in 2020. “Mixing elements of heritage and genre in tune with body and space, The Handbook of Vivid Moments, the third record from Greensboro electro-artist, Quilla— the artistic persona from Montreal-born Anna Luisa Daigneault— serves as a vessel for expression and empowerment in a time of dystopia, laid amongst dance floor beats.”
