= Light Years Away (Tiësto song) =

2014 Single by Tiësto

Single by Tiësto featuring Dbx

from the album A Town Called Paradise
- Released: 28 November 2014
- Genre: Electro house; dance-pop
- Length: 3:22
- Label: Musical Freedom; PM:AM; Casablanca; Republic; Universal
- Songwriter(s): Tijs Verwest; Pete Kirtley; Sacha Collisson; John James Newman
- Producer(s): Tiësto; Dbx; Matt Nash; Dave Silcox

Tiësto singles chronology
"Say Something" (2014)	"Light Years Away" (2014)	"Secrets" (2015)

Alternative cover

"Light Years Away" is a song by Dutch disc jockey and producer Tiësto in collaboration with British band Dbx, which is composed of the producers Pete Kirtley and Sacha Collisson and the singer-songwriter John James Newman. It was released on 28 November 2014 by PM:AM Recordings as the fourth single from Tiësto's fifth studio album, A Town Called Paradise.

== Background and release ==
Tiësto declared about the song : "'Light Years Away' is a very beautiful song. It's very pretty. It reminds me a little bit of an old Massive Attack track. It sounds really big and euphoric. I think the vocals are great and also it's very haunty." Pete Kirtley from Dbx affirmed in an interview that the song is about "not giving up, even though the path ahead sometimes seems impossible and unreachable".

== Music video ==
The music video shows the expedition of a scientist and her white robot on a planet to analyse its composition.

== Track listing ==
CD single

1. "Light Years Away" – 3:11
2. "Light Years Away" (Extended Radio Edit) – 6:55

Digital Download – Remixes

1. "Light Years Away" (Extended Radio Edit) – 6:55
2. "Light Years Away" (Tiësto & MOTi Remix) – 4:37
3. "Light Years Away" (Oliver Heldens Remix) – 4:48
4. "Light Years Away" (Skyden Remix) – 5:46
5. "Light Years Away" (HeyHey Remix) – 3:04
6. "Light Years Away" (David K Remix) – 7:07
7. "Light Years Away" (Unclubbed Classic Mix) – 6:22

== Charts ==
Chart (2014)	Peak position
Belgium (Ultratip Bubbling Under Flanders)	67
Belgium (Ultratip Bubbling Under Wallonia)	19
US Hot Dance/Electronic Songs (Billboard)	23
