= Halfway There (Tiësto and Dzeko song) =

Promotional single by Tiësto and Dzeko featuring Lena Leon

from the album Together
- Released: 15 March 2019
- Genre: Bassline; big room house
- Length: 4:24
- Label: Musical Freedom; Spinnin'
- Songwriter(s): Tijs Verwest; Julian Dzeko; Luis Torres; Lena Leon
- Producer(s): Tiësto; Dzeko; Luis Torres; April Bender

"Halfway There" is a song by Dutch disc jockey and producer Tiësto and Canadian disc jockey and producer Dzeko with vocals from singer Lena Leon. It was released on 15 March 2019 in the Netherlands as a promotional single. The song is included in the Together EP.

== Background and release ==
The song was premiered by Tiësto during his performance at Tomorrowland 2018. He declared about the song : "It has a nice old-school, catchy melody and that’s why I love this so much!"

== Track listing ==
Digital Download (MF332)

1. "Halfway There" – 4:11

== Charts ==
Chart (2019)	Peak position
Belgium Dance (Ultratop Flanders)	25
