= Magikal Journey =

Magik Journey - The Hits Collection 1998-2008

Compilation album by Tiësto
- Released: 17 May 2010
- Genre: Progressive trance; tech trance; vocal trance
- Label: Magik Muzik
- Producer: Tiesto; DJ Waakop-Reijers-Fraaij

Tiësto chronology
Kaleidoscope (2009)	Magik Journey - The Hits Collection 1998-2008 (2010)	Kaleidoscope: Remixed (2010)

Professional ratings
Review scores
Source	Rating
AllMusic	4.5/5 stars

Magikal Journey - The Hits Collection 1998-2008 is a compilation album by Dutch electronic dance music producer and DJ Tiësto. The double album was released on 17 May 2010 by Magik Muzik, nine months after Tiësto announced that he had parted ways with Black Hole Recordings, a trance record label he set up with Arny Bink in 1997. Disc one features tracks from Tiësto's three studio albums In My Memory, Just Be and Elements of Life, as well as the two previously unreleased tracks "Magikal Circus" and "Goldrush" (A track that appeared on the PSP game Wipeout Pure). Disc two sees a wide range of artists like Airbase, Laidback Luke, Sander van Doorn, and Bart Claessen on the remix duties for many of Tiësto's successful singles.

== Track listing ==
=== European edition ===
Disc one
No.	Title	Length
1.	"Flight 643"	2:51
2.	"Suburban Train"	3:24
3.	"Lethal Industry"	2:43
4.	"In My Memory" (featuring Nicola Hitchcock)	6:06
5.	"Traffic"	2:54
6.	"Love Comes Again" (featuring BT)	3:13
7.	"Just Be" (featuring Kirsty Hawkshaw)	3:11
8.	"Adagio for Strings"	3:25
9.	"Dance4Life" (featuring Maxi Jazz)	3:30
10.	"In the Dark" (featuring Christian Burns)	3:51
11.	"Break My Fall" (featuring BT)	3:23
12.	"Elements of Life" (Radio Edit Live from Copenhagen)	3:34
13.	"643 (Love's on Fire)" (featuring Suzanne Palmer)	2:47
14.	"Goldrush"	9:22
15.	"Magikal Circus"	12:01
16.	"Obsession" (with Junkie XL)	9:07
17.	"Forever Today"	11:57

Disc two
No.	Title	Length
1.	"In the Dark" (featuring Christian Burns) (Tiësto 2010 Remix)	7:09
2.	"In My Memory" (featuring Nicola Hitchcock) (Tiësto Remix)	9:13
3.	"Just Be" (featuring Kirsty Hawkshaw) (Tiësto Remix)	9:13
4.	"Lethal Industry" (Hardwell Remix)	5:45
5.	"Carpe Noctum" (Spencer & Hill Dub)	4:34
6.	"Everything" (featuring JES) (Andrew Bennett Remix)	6:01
7.	"Elements of Life" (Airbase Remix)	6:19
8.	"Traffic" (Richard Durand Remix)	6:53
9.	"Flight 643" (Laidback Luke 2010 Rework)	6:00
10.	"Suburban Train" (Sean Tyas Dirty Mix)	6:42
11.	"Love Comes Again" (featuring BT) (Bart Claessen Remix)	7:25

Digital bonus tracks
No.	Title	Length
12.	"Dance4Life" (featuring Maxi Jazz) (Sander van Doorn Remix)	7:38
13.	"In the Dark" (featuring Christian Burns) (Shiny Toy Guns Club Mix)	7:47
14.	"Love Comes Again" (featuring BT) (Myon & Shane 54 Monster Mix)	6:32

=== US edition ===
Disc one
No.	Title	Length
1.	"Flight 643"
2.	"Suburban Train"
3.	"Lethal Industry"
4.	"In My Memory" (featuring Nicola Hitchcock) (Tiësto Remix)
5.	"Traffic"
6.	"Love Comes Again" (featuring BT)
7.	"Just Be" (featuring Kirsty Hawkshaw)
8.	"Adagio for Strings"
9.	"Obsession" (with Junkie XL)
10.	"Goldrush (edit)"
11.	"Magikal Circus (edit)"

Disc two
No.	Title	Length
1.	"Dance4Life" (featuring Maxi Jazz)
2.	"In the Dark" (featuring Christian Burns)
3.	"Break My Fall" (featuring BT)
4.	"Elements of Life" (Radio Edit Live from Copenhagen)
5.	"Carpe Noctum" (Spencer & Hill Dub)
6.	"Ten Seconds Before Sunrise"
7.	"Everything" (featuring JES) (Andrew Bennett Remix)
8.	"Escape Me"
9.	"Louder Than Boom"
10.	"In the Dark" (featuring Christian Burns) (Tiësto 2010 Remix)

== Charts ==
=== Weekly charts ===
Weekly chart performance for Magikal Journey
Chart (2010)	Peak position
Australian Albums (ARIA)	168
Austrian Albums (Ö3 Austria)	39
Belgian Albums (Ultratop Flanders)	2
Belgian Albums (Ultratop Wallonia)	4
Canadian Albums (Billboard)	18
Danish Albums (Hitlisten)	31
Dutch Albums (Album Top 100)	11
German Albums (Offizielle Top 100)	58
Irish Albums (IRMA)	7
Norwegian Albums (VG-lista)	15
Russian Albums (2M)	1
UK Albums (OCC)	27
US Top Dance Albums (Billboard)	7

=== Year-end charts ===
Year-end chart performance for Magikal Journey
Chart (2010)	Position
Belgian Albums (Ultratop Flanders)	76
Belgian Albums (Ultratop Wallonia)	78
Dutch Albums (Album Top 100)	93
Russian Albums (2M)	47

== Certifications ==
Certifications for Magikal Journey
Region	Certification	Certified units/sales
Russia (NFPF)	Gold	5,000^{*}
United Kingdom (BPI)	Silver	60,000^{*}
^{*} Sales figures based on certification alone.

== Release history ==
Release history and formats for Magikal Journey
Region	Date	Label	Format	Catalog
United Kingdom	16 May 2010	Nebula Music	Digital download	NEBBD9017
United Kingdom	17 May 2010	Nebula Music	CD	NEBCD9017
Netherlands	17 May 2010	Magik Muzik	CD	Magik Muzik CD 17
Netherlands	17 May 2010	Magik Muzik	Digital download	MM CD 17
Netherlands	17 May 2010	Magik Muzik	Vinyl LP	Magik Muzik LP 17
Australia	21 May 2010	405 Recordings	CD, digital download	45CD10029
Scandinavia	24 May 2010	DJ Beat Records Scandinavia	CD, digital download	DJB113CD
United States	8 June 2010	Ultra Records	CD, digital download	
Germany		Kontor Records	CD, digital download	EDE76132
Hong Kong	6 December 2010	Avex Hong Kong	CD, digital download	AVICD60702/A
