= Mr. Sam =

- Born: Samuel Riberio; 27 June 1975 (age 50); Tourcoing, Hauts-de-France, France
- Genres: Techno, Trance, House, Progressive
- Occupations: DJ, Irish dancer, Teacher
- Years active: 2008–present
- Labels: APPIA, Black Hole Recordings, Magik Muzik
- Website: http://www.mrsam.tv/

Samuel Joël Paquet (French pronunciation: [samɥɛl ʒɔɛl pakɛ]; born 27 June 1975), better known by his stage name, Mr. Sam, is a French techno and trance music DJ, and record producer.

== Biography and career ==
=== Early career (1990–2002) ===
Born in Tourcoing, where he grew up listening to music by Giorgio Moroder, Klaus Schulze and Elvis Presley, he began to get in touch with the outside world and later grew up with his first Depeche Mode purchase, which dragged him into the synthesizer-based genre of music. Electronic dance music became his aspiration; at age sixteen he decided to pursue a musical career in Belgium. By age eighteen he had begun playing at underground clubs, in which he played trance, which was a fast-growing style at the time. He later received an invitation to play at a major club, La Rocca, in Belgium. He embarked on tours in which he played with other DJs at Portugal, the Netherlands, Germany, Italy, Switzerland and Corsica; he met Andry Nalin and played for 12 consecutive hours with him at a concert. Moving around Europe, he managed to become resident at the clubs Lagoa, La Nova, Tour & Taxi, Pacha. It was not until 1999 when he was able to master and create his own remix for Diki Records which was Circuit Boys' "The Door", with the years he improved his remixing skills. In early 2000s, he met Frederic de Backer and both worked under the alias Madrid Inc. with the song My Sunday’s Love, which became a success and also marked his first steps to one of the most important dates in his life when Black Hole Recordings heard the July Summer Edition of Ministry Magazine's free covermount CD with My Sunday's Love.

=== Rise to fame (2003–2007) ===
In 2003, Sam was contacted by Magik Muzik, which is a sub-label from Black Hole owned by Tiësto. Mr. Sam and Fred Baker presented a new alias, As One, with one song known as "Forever Waiting" which was released the same year. Learning did not stop for Sam as he and Tim Coltrane decided to collaborate as The Tribute; the track was picked up by Soundpiercing Records and it included a remix by Sam and Backer. Even though his first officially released single was "Pressurize" in 2002 as himself, it was not until 2003 when he collaborated with Rani Kamalesvaran to create his first vocal song; Fred Backer assisted him with the mastering and writing but was not part of the project. The single was released through Yeti Recordings with a remix by his close mate Tim Coltrane. In 2004 he and friend Dimitri Andreas released the first song from a list of popular songs as Mojado through Magik Muzik which was "Naranja". Even though Sam had begun the Mojado project, he still continued to create music as Mr. Sam on Black Hole such as Flying Around which featured "Crash Course In Science"; the song was arranged, produced, and written with the help of Coltrane. He was asked to create his first studio album for 2006, and he began working with the first single "Lyteo", which featured the vocals of Kirsty Hawkshaw and was his only release in 2005. The second single prior to the album was "Insight", which also featured Kirsty Hawkshaw and guitarist Benjamin Desmet. In 2006 his first studio album Lyteo was released with 14 songs, two of them pre-released. His first single released after the album was "Split" which also contained vocals from Hawkshaw and remixed by T4L and Jonas Steur. In 2007, Black Hole released a remix album known as Lyteo Interpretations which was also released through Maelstrom Records once it gained fame. Before 2007 ended he released his first DJ mix compilation known as Opus in which he featured many unreleased tracks then and later became world-known single such as the B-side by Andy Duguid "Dreamcatcher", Global Experience's "Madras" and JES' "In Ohm", all members of the Black Hole family.

=== APPIA Music (2008–present) ===
In 2008, Mr. Sam founded his own label known as APPIA, the sub-label belongs to Black Hole Recordings and it was created to release Sam's own work and to bring new talent selected by Sam himself, which also made it possible for him to release his forthcoming album and his new Opus Secundo compilation. The first single from APPIA Music was "Anasthasia" which consists of Sam and T99, the second release is "Dominator" made by Mr. Sam and Human Resource which is the first single from his new album. Recently he released Opus Secundo through Black Hole, the compilation has opened the door to new talent such as Emilio Fernandez who joined the sub-label SongBird from Black Hole, and Vernal, dPen, Issues, as well as one of his latest collaboration with Andy Duguid and Richard from Solarstone known as "Hold My Breath".

== Discography ==
=== Albums ===
Studio albums

- 2006: Lyteo
- 2010: Pop Model

Remix albums

- 2007: Lyteo Interpretations

Compilation albums

- 2007: Opus
- 2008: Opus Secundo
- 2009: Opus Tertio
- 2010: Opus Quarto

=== Singles ===
Production singles

- 2002 - Mr Sam - Pressurize (Yeti)
- 2003 - Mr Sam - Surrender (Yeti)
- 2004 - Orbit Catcher - We Are Free (Intensive)
- 2005 - Mr Sam - Flying Around (Black Hole)
- 2005 - Mr Sam - Lyteo (Black Hole)
- 2006 - Mr Sam - Insight (Black Hole)
- 2006 - Mr Sam - Split (Black Hole)
- 2009 - Mr Sam - Tantra (APPIA)
- 2009 - Mr Sam - Mixi (APPIA)

Co-production singles

- 2002 - Mr Sam vs. Flatner - Chemical Adventures Vol. 1 (Yeti)
- 2002 - Mr Sam vs. Fred Baker - I Miss You (Axe)
- 2003 - Mr Sam vs. Fred Baker pres. As One - Forever Waiting (Magik Muzik)
- 2003 - Mr Sam vs. Tim Coltrane pres. The Tribute - One More Day (Soundpiercing)
- 2008 - Mr Sam vs. T99 - Anasthasia (APPIA)
- 2008 - Mr Sam vs. Human Resource - Dominator (APPIA)
- 2008 - Mr Sam feat. clAud9 - Cygnes (APPIA)
- 2009 - Mr Sam vs. Andy Duguid - Hold My Breath (Black Hole)
- 2009 - Mr Sam ft. T4L - Menkayo (APPIA)
- 2009 - Mr Sam ft T4L - Rydem Koba (APPIA)
- 2009 - Mr Sam ft Andy Duguid - Tra Zomas (APPIA)
