= Battleship Grey =

Promotional single by DJ Tiësto featuring Kirsty Hawkshaw

from the album In My Memory and Meta Message
- Released: 2001
- Recorded: 2000
- Genre: Downtempo; trip hop
- Label: Nebula; New State
- Songwriters: Tijs Verwest; Kirsty Hawkshaw
- Producer: DJ Tiësto

"Battleship Grey" is a song by Dutch DJ and producer DJ Tiësto featuring vocals from English singer Kirsty Hawkshaw, recorded in 2000. It is included on Tiësto's first album, In My Memory, and on Hawkshaw's album, Meta Message.

The chill-out track was a remix created by Danish duo Miro and led to the 2001 release of a promotional single in the United Kingdom. Three hundred copies of the single were released through Nebula Records for promotional use only. A further hundred copies were pressed through other labels.

== Track listing ==
Nebula 12" vinyl

1. "Battleship Grey" (Side A) (original mix) – 5:13
2. "Battleship Grey" (Side B) (Miro remix) – 6:27

== Releases ==
Region	Date	Label	Format	Catalog
United Kingdom	2001	Nebula	Vinyl; 12"; promo	BATTLE 1
