= In My Memory =

Studio album by DJ Tiësto
- Released: 15 April 2001
- Recorded: 2001
- Genre: Trance
- Length: 68:19
- Labels: Magik Muzik; Black Hole Recordings; Nettwerk Records; Virgin Records
- Producers: Tiësto; Junkie XL

DJ Tiësto chronology
In Search of Sunrise 2 (2000)	In My Memory (2001)	Revolution (2001)

Singles from In My Memory
- 1. "Flight 643" Released: 30 April 2001; 2. "Suburban Train" Released: 6 November 2001; 3. "Lethal Industry" Released: 2001; 4. "In My Memory" Released: 23 April 2002

In My Memory is the debut studio album by Dutch DJ Tiësto. It was released on 15 April 2001 (see 2001 in music). This album featured the vocals of Jan Johnston, Nicola Hitchcock, and Kirsty Hawkshaw. Junkie XL produced "Obsession" on this album. This album produced four major hits that launched Tiësto's career: "Flight 643", "Obsession", "Lethal Industry" and "Suburban Train". A remix album was released later on and it charted #12 in the US Hot Dance Club Play.

Professional ratings
Review scores
Source	Rating
AllMusic	2/5 stars

== Overview ==
In 2001, Tiësto created a new sub-label, Magik Muzik, and released his first solo album, In My Memory, which contained 5 major hits; "Lethal Industry", which was actually produced in 1999 and had only 3 copies released at that time, the track was officially released in 2001 which was remixed by Richard Durand in 2006 along with "Flight 643" which was another leading single that was later adapted with vocals by Suzanne Palmer and released as "643 (Love's on Fire)". Other tracks were "Obsession" in which Tiësto worked alongside Junkie XL, the instrumental tracks "Dallas 4PM" and "Suburban Train" with "Urban Train" as its vocal version. The last singles to be released were "In My Memory" which is the title track for the album as it only received high ratings in the United States and the opening track "Magik Journey" which opened Tiësto in Concert (2003). On 2 February 2002, Tiësto played seven consecutive hours during the second edition of the Dutch Dimension festival.

On 27 February, Tiësto was awarded a Zilveren ('Silver') Harp music award. The same year he also received a Lucky Strike Dance Award in the category Best DJ Trance/Progressive. In August he became part of Moby's Area2 Tour. For eighteen days he travelled through the United States with artists such as Moby himself, but also David Bowie and Busta Rhymes. In January 2003, Tiësto received the annual Dutch Popprijs ('Pop Award') during the Noorderslag festival. After touring with Moby, Tiësto remixed two songs from him, "We Are All Made of Stars" and "Extreme Ways" in the same year, having "We Are All Made of Stars" reach No. 13 in the Hot Dance Club Play. In 2002 he released his first In Search of Sunrise mix to feature a place on its name, In Search of Sunrise 3: Panama. On 28 March 2003; Tiësto, Dieselboy, Bad Boy Bill, and Noel Sanger joined the PlayStation 2 Dual Play tour. Tiësto and Noel's appearance began on 13 April and ended on 6 June.

His fame continued to increase for then known he has in the early 2000s, following his six-hour "Tiësto Solo" sets which he performed without other DJs or opening acts. This idea, of one DJ playing alone to a large crowd was new. Tiësto was the first DJ to hold a solo concert in a stadium; on 10 May 2003, he performed for 25,000 people in Arnhem's GelreDome, later called Tiësto in Concert. He repeated the same type of concert the following year during two consecutive nights in late October. In addition to holding these two concerts for 35,000 of his fans, he held another concert for a crowd of 20,000 in Hasselt, Belgium the following week. DVDs of both his 10 May 2003 and 30 October 2004 concerts have been released, having the other DVD titled Tiësto in Concert 2. The DVDs show the journey from the first idea to the main event, featuring live performances by Andain, Dinand Woesthoff, and Jan Johnston. The event includes live music and dancers performing at different times throughout the set.

== Track listing ==
All tracks produced by ghost producer Dennis Waakop Reijers, except "Obsession" produced by Tiësto and Junkie XL.

Standard version
No.	Title	Writer(s)	Length
1.	"Magik Journey"	Tiësto; Geert Huinink	9:58
2.	"Close to You"	Tiësto; Jan Johnston	5:01
3.	"Dallas 4 PM"	Tiësto	6:43
4.	"In My Memory"	Tiësto; Nicola Hitchcock	6:07
5.	"Obsession"	Tiësto; Tom Holkenborg	9:07
6.	"Battleship Grey"	Tiësto; Kirsty Hawkshaw	5:13
7.	"Flight 643"	Tiësto	9:01
8.	"Lethal Industry"	Tiësto	6:46
9.	"Suburban Train"	Tiësto; Ronald van Gelderen	10:20

Limited edition bonus disc
No.	Title	Lyrics	Length
1.	"Suburban Train" (Way Out West Remix)		8:52
2.	"Sparkles" (Starecase Remix)		7:57
3.	"643 (Love's on Fire)" (Quivver Remix)		7:38
4.	"643 (Love's on Fire)" (Oliver Klein Vox Mix)	Suzanne Palmer	8:57
5.	"In My Memory" (Airwave Instrumental)		8:03
6.	"Lethal Industry" (Svenson & Gielen Remix)		3:20
7.	"643 (Love's on Fire)" (Oliver Lieb Instrumental)		7:02
8.	"Urban Train" (Cosmic Gate Remix)		7:30
9.	"In My Memory" (V-One Remix)	Nicola Hitchcock	8:07
10.	"Lethal Industry" (Mauro Picotto Remix)		7:39

Notes

- "Close to You" features vocals by Jan Johnston.
- "In My Memory" features vocals by Nicola Hitchcock.
- "Battleship Grey" features vocals by Kirsty Hawkshaw.

== Charts ==
Chart (2001)	Peak position
Dutch Albums (Album Top 100)	25

== Release history ==
Country	Release date
Netherlands	1 October 2001
United States	6 November 2001
