= Tiësto in Concert =

Video by Tiësto
- Released: October 6, 2003
- Recorded: May 10, 2003; Gelredome; Arnhem, Gelderland, Netherlands
- Genre: Trance
- Length: 200 minutes (3 hour and 20 Minutes)
- Label: Black Hole Recordings
- Director: Peter van Eyndt
- Producer: Arny Bink, Wilfried Dam, Stan Gordijn

Tiësto in Concert is a DVD and Blu-ray of Tiësto's concert on May 10, 2003, at the Gelredome in Arnhem, Gelderland, Netherlands, when he performed before an audience of over 25,000 people. The concert was divided into parties with live performances by groups, bands and artists representing a country, which in turn represented a continent. It begins with a presentation by Tiësto followed by a live performance by Andain who presents to Britain and Europe. Then, a group of carnival Samba presents to Brazil and South America. The singer's live performance and band Dinand Woesthoff presents "The Star-Spangled Banner" to the United States. The Chinese group Orange Studio performs the theme "Tiësto in Concert Asia", presented to countries there. After a live performance by singer Jan Johnston, Omar Ka & Fula Band presents to Africa, and finally, the live performance of Jerry de Jonge & Beijerink presents to Australia and Oceania.

== Video listing ==
No.	Title	Length
1.	"Tiësto - Magik Journey (Intro Edit)"	2:09
2.	"Tiësto - Adagio For Strings"	7:24
3.	"Ernesto vs. Bastian - Who's The Starter?"	5:35
4.	"Skin - Faithfullness (Tiësto Remix)"	5:52
5.	"Andain - Beautiful Things (Live Performance of Mavie Marcos)"	8:24
6.	"Brotherhood / Cave - Samba In The Hood / Carnival"	3:01
7.	"Roc Project - Never (Filterheadz Luv Tina Remix)"	5:33
8.	"David Forbes - Answers"	6:52
9.	"Mojado - "Naranja" (Dimitri Andreas Version)"	3:30
10.	"Salt Tank - Eugina (Michael Woods Remix)"	2:59
11.	"Kane - Rain Down On Me (Tiësto Remix) (Live Performance of Dinand Woesthoff)"	7:39
12.	"Traditional - The Star Spangled Banner"	0:58
13.	"Hampshire & Nysse - Eternal Voices (Tiësto Alternative Breaks Mix)"	5:32
14.	"Scott Bond vs. Solar Stone - 3rd Earth"	7:15
15.	"Fictivision vs. C-Quence - Symbols"	5:44
16.	"Max Walder - Crown"	5:27
17.	"F. Massif - Understatement"	5:07
18.	"Conjure One - Tears From The Moon (Tiësto Remix)"	6:15
19.	"Tiësto - Traffic"	5:23
20.	"Orange Studio's - Tiësto In Concert Asia"	6:27
21.	"Coast 2 Coast - Searching"	2:08
22.	"Solar Factor - Urban Shakedown"	4:03
23.	"Freefall - Skydive (Live Performance of Jan Johnston)"	7:26
24.	"Literon / Speedy J - Collabs 200: Snacker"	3:51
25.	"Tiësto - Lethal Industry"	5:02
26.	"Mark Norman - Rush"	6:23
27.	"Omar Ka & Fula Band - Dimel / Koode Nyaari"	4:06
28.	"Tiësto - Theme From Norefjell (DJ Jan & Christophe Chantzis Mix)"	5:09
29.	"Riley & Durrant - Candesco"	7:14
30.	"Tiësto - Nyana"	5:21
31.	"Saltwater - The Legacy (Alphazone Remix)"	7:34
32.	"DJ Ton T.B. - Electronic Malfunction"	8:09
33.	"Tiësto - Flight 643"	6:28
34.	"Armani & Ghost - Airport"	2:52
35.	"Jerry de Jonge & Beijerink - Didjerrydoo"	1:49
36.	"Tiësto & Junkie XL - Obsession (Frank Biazzi Mix)"	2:37
37.	"Komakino - Man On Mars (DJ Jan Remix)"	5:28
38.	"Tiësto - Suburban Train"	10:55
39.	"Ricky Fobis - No Regular"	3:01
40.	"End Credits"

== Certifications ==
Region	Certification	Certified units/sales
Ireland (IRMA)	4× Platinum	16,000^{^}
Netherlands (NVPI)	Gold	40,000^{^}
^{^} Shipments figures based on certification alone.

== Release history ==
Country	Release date
Netherlands	October 6, 2003
United States	2003
