= 643 (Love's on Fire) =

- 643 (Love's on Fire) single cover

Single by DJ Tiësto featuring Suzanne Palmer

from the album In My Memory
- Released: June 13, 2002
- Recorded: 2001
- Genre: Vocal trance
- Label: Magik Muzik; Black Hole
- Songwriter(s): Tijs Verwest; Suzanne Palmer
- Producer(s): DJ Tiësto

DJ Tiësto singles chronology
"Flight 643" (2001)	"643 (Love's on Fire)" (2002)	"Obsession" (2002)

"643 (Love's on Fire)" is a single which appeared in DJ Tiësto first album, In My Memory titled as "Flight 643" and was later adapted with vocals by Suzanne Palmer. A megamix was released, just like "Lethal Industry"'s Lethal Edit, the track includes remixes by Oliver Klein, Oliver Lieb, Orkidea, Quivver, and Richard Durand. "643 (Love's On Fire)" also appears on the Disc 2 of the DJ Tiësto's album In My Memory.

== Formats and track listings ==
=== CD, Maxi Singles ===
Netherlands, Scandinavia Maxi Single

1. "643 (Love's On Fire)" (Radio Edit) - 2:49
2. "643 (Love's On Fire)" (Oliver Klein Vox Mix) - 6:52
3. "643 (Love's On Fire)" (Oliver Lieb Vocal Remix) - 7:49
4. "643 (Love's On Fire)" (Oliver Lieb Vocal Remix) - 7:47
5. "643 (Love's On Fire)" (Quivver Vocal Mix) - 7:46

VC Recordings Maxi Single

1. "643 (Love's On Fire)" (Radio Edit) - 2:51
2. "643 (Love's On Fire)" (Oliver Klein Vocal Mix) - 6:50
3. "643 (Love's On Fire)" (Oliver Lieb Vocal Remix) - 4:44
4. "643 (Love's On Fire)" (Quivver Vocal Remix) - 5:25
5. "643 (Love's On Fire)" (video) (2:47)

Nettwerk America Maxi Single

1. "643 (Love's On Fire)" (Oliver Klein Vocal Mix) - 6:50
2. "643 (Love's On Fire)" (Oliver Lieb Vocal Remix) - 4:44
3. "643 (Love's On Fire)" (Quivver Vocal Remix) - 5:25

=== 12" Vinyl ===
Magik Muzik 12" Vinyl

1. "643 (Love's On Fire)" (Oliver Klein Vox Mix) - 6:52
2. "643 (Love's On Fire)" (Quivver Vocal Remix) - 7:46
3. "643 (Love's On Fire)" (Oliver Lieb Vocal Mix) - 7:49
4. "643 (Love's On Fire)" (Oliver Lieb Instrumental) - 7:47

VC Recordings 12" Vinyl

1. "643 (Love's On Fire)" (Megamix) - 14:05
2. "Flight 643" (Original Mix) - 5:46
3. "Flight 643" (video)

VC Recordings 12" Vinyl

1. "643 (Love's On Fire)" (Quivver Instrumental Mix)

VC Recordings 12" Vinyl

1. "643 (Love's On Fire)" (Oliver Klein Vox Mix) - 8:57
2. "643 (Love's On Fire)" (Quivver Vocal Remix) - 7:38

Magik Muzik 12" Vinyl

1. "643 (Love's On Fire)" (Radio Edit) - 2:49
2. "643 (Love's On Fire)" (Oliver Klein Vox Mix) - 6:52

VC Recordings 12" Vinyl

1. "643 (Love's On Fire)" (Radio Edit) - 2:50

VC Recordings 12" Vinyl

1. "643 (Love's On Fire)" (Oliver Lieb Vocal Mix) - 4:44
2. "643 (Love's On Fire)" (Oliver Lieb Instrumental)

VC Recordings 12" Vinyl

1. "643 (Love's On Fire)" (Oliver Klein Vocal Mix) - 6:52
2. "643 (Love's On Fire)" (Oliver Lieb Vocal Remix) - 7:49
3. "643 (Love's On Fire)" (Quivver Vocal Remix) - 7:46

== Charts ==
Chart (2002)	Peak position
Netherlands Singles Chart	55
Belgium Singles Chart	50
UK Singles Chart	36

== Official versions ==
- Radio Edit (2:51)
- Megamix (14:05)
- Oliver Klein Vocal Mix (6:50)
- Oliver Lieb Vocal Remix (7:47)
- Oliver Lieb Instrumental (7:49)
- Quivver Vocal Remix (7:38)
- Quivver Instrumental Mix

== Release history ==
Region	Date	Label	Format	Catalog
Netherlands	June 13, 2002	Magik Muzik	2 x vinyl, 12"	Magik Muzik 806-5
Netherlands	July 29, 2002	Magik Muzik	CD, Maxi	Magik Muzik 806-2
Netherlands	July 29, 2002	Magik Muzik	CD, Single	Magik Muzik 806-1
United Kingdom	2002	VC Recordings	vinyl, 12", Single Sided, Promo	VCRTXXDJ 106
United Kingdom	2002	VC Recordings	vinyl, 12", Promo	VCRTXDJ 106
United Kingdom	2002	VC Recordings	vinyl, Single, Promo	VCRDDJ 106
United Kingdom	2002	VC Recordings	vinyl, 12", Promo	VCRTDJ 106
United Kingdom	June 17, 2002	VC Recordings	CD, Maxi, Enhanced	VCRD 106
United Kingdom	June 17, 2002	VC Recordings	vinyl, 12"	VCRT 106
United Kingdom	June, 2002	VC Recordings	CD, Single, Enhanced	VCRDX 106
United States	2002	Nettwerk America	vinyl, 12"	0 6700 33168 1 1
Scandinavia	2002	Playground Music Scandinavia	CD, Maxi	MAGIK MUZIK 806-2
