= Mark Norman (DJ) =

Dutch DJ

- Also known as: Celice
- Origin: Netherlands
- Genres: Trance
- Occupation(s): DJ, Producer, Remixer
- Years active: 2001–present
- Labels: Magik Muzik
- Members: Norman Lenden
- Past members: Mark de Jong (left in 2011)
- Website: www.mark-norman.com

Mark Norman is the name of award-winning Dutch trance producer Norman Lenden. Until 2011, when Mark de Jong left, it was a group. They have produced several high-profile tracks and remixes.

== History ==
=== Early career (2001–2006) ===
Influenced by Duran Duran, Pet Shop Boys and Kraftwerk Mark Norman's Enigma influence created their personal style. Mark Norman signed to Black Hole Recordings on Tiësto’s own Magik Muzik label, original tracks like "Stream" have been featured on Tiësto's Another Day at the Office DVD. The talent of Mark Norman has led them to be signed to Tiësto's label, Black Hole Recordings. They have also had their tracks heavily playlisted by big name DJ's including Rush during Tiësto In Concert. Norman Lenden played with Cor Fijneman at Trance Energy 2006 which represented the finale of his 80 Days Around the World Tour. He played at Trance Energy 2007. Mark Norman have also DJed at an invitational concert of "ATB In Concert 2", which was a concert organized by ATB that was held in Poznań. Since their relationship with the label, Mark Norman also have been selected as two of the not so many artists who get to mix the globally renowned "In Trance We Trust" series. As their popularity grew, Mark Norman received "The Frysian Pop Award" in the Netherlands for services to dance music, to prove their strength in the genre, they joined a classical orchestra and created a unique project. In 2006 after releasing various singles, they released their artist album "Synchronicity" which received good publicity by international press. To commemorate their success with the album they began a world tour "80 Days Around The World", which was described as one of the most unusual concepts of 2006 by the Netherlands' most leading magazines, they also played together with Enrique Iglesias at the famous Nikki Beach. The 80 Days World Tour took place with Cor Fijneman on a trip to 20 countries with 35 dates scheduled. They were also awarded The Frysian Pop Award in the Netherlands.

=== Colours (2007–Present) ===
During 2007 Mark Norman finished their second artist album, collaborating with JES from Motorcycle and Celine Frewer. The album named "Colours" shows a more electronic house music feel as their style has changed through time, but keeping their fans satisfied with progressive trance and dance music. The first release from the album was "Colour My Eyes" which had gained already massive success as it was presented by Tiësto in his DJ Mix compilation of In Search of Sunrise 5: Los Angeles. Mark Norman’s management "Global Twist Music" has begun the preparation for a grand world tour, supported by V Media Creative, alongside "Black Hole Recordings". They were nominated for "Best Mix of The Year" by Kiss FM for a show they had at Club Forsage, Ukraine.

== Discography ==
=== Albums ===
- 2005 Mark Norman Collection
- 2005 Synchronicity
- 2006 Before The Flood (Contains 10 tracks from Mark Norman Collection)
- 2007 Colours

=== Singles ===
- 2002 Faith
- 2003 Stream
- 2004 Phantom Manor/Rush
- 2005 Teardrops
- 2005 Touch Down/False Vegas
- 2006 Brasilia
- 2006 Colour My Eyes
- 2007 Blikken Machine
- 2007 Niagara
- 2007 Ventura
- 2007 Be With You
- 2008 Phantom Manor
- 2008 Bazarus
- 2008 Restart
- 2009 Life's Too Short (2009)
- 2009 Coffee Break
- 2009 Confuse

=== Remixes ===
- 2003 Amplified Heart
- 2003 Bit Staboi
- 2003 Signum – First Strike
- 2003 Tomahawk
- 2004 Tiesto feat. BT – Love Comes Again
- 2004 Sex Machine
- 2004 Forever
- 2004 Mind Of The Wonderful
- 2004 Salt Lake – Sunset Highway
- 2004 Sonsuz
- 2005 Above The Clouds
- 2005 Another Situation
- 2005 Three Drives – Greece 2000
- 2006 BT feat JC Chasez- Somnambulist (Simply Being Loved)
- 2007 Sasha – Xpander (Not available on release)
