= Colours (Mark Norman album) =

Studio album by Mark Norman
- Released: (Netherlands) 30 October 2007 Digital (Netherlands) 16 November 2007 CD
- Recorded: 2007
- Genre: Electronic; Trance; Tech House; House
- Length: CD 1:13:44
- Label: Magik Muzik
- Producer: Mark de Jong; Norman Lenden

Mark Norman chronology
Synchronicity (2005)	Colours (2007)

Singles from Colours
- 1. "Colour My Eyes"; 2. "Blikken Machine"; 3. "Niagara"; 4. "Ventura"; 5. "Be With U"

Professional ratings
Review scores
Source	Rating
Magesy	4/5 stars

Colours is the second studio album by Mark de Jong and Norman Lenden as Mark Norman under Magik Muzik, a sub-label from Black Hole Recordings. All tracks with the exception of "Talk Like a Stranger" and "One Moon Circling" were produced and composed by Mark Norman To celebrate the release of the album, Mark Norman's management Global Twist Music prepared a world tour, supported by V Media Creative.

== Track listing ==
Colours
No.	Title	Lyrics	Length
1.	"Colour My Eyes"	Celine	6:57
2.	"Space Invaders"		5:51
3.	"Horizons"		5:41
4.	"Talk Like A Stranger"	JES	4:37
5.	"Be With U"	Celine	7:06
6.	"Niagara"		5:49
7.	"One Moon Circling"	JES	6:30
8.	"Blikken Machine"		6:11
9.	"Become Human"		6:01
10.	"Saint Barth's"		6:24
11.	"Ventura"		6:33
12.	"Abend"		6:06
13.	"Shiva (Digital Bonus Track)"		8:02
14.	"Tapas (Digital Bonus Track)"		7:26

Note: The Digital Edition contains two bonus tracks.

== Credits ==
- Composer(s), Producer(s), Writer(s): Mark de Jong & Norman Lenden
- Artwork and Design By: Jeroen Vos
- Mastered By: Pieter De Wagter
- Photography: Rick van der Wal

== Publishers ==
- "Colour My Eyes" and "Be With U" are published by D.Y.M. Music / Melpar
- "Talk Like A Stranger" are published by Tazigirl Music (ASCAP) / Deepsky Music
- "One Moon Circling" are published by Tazigirl Music (ASCAP) / Zen Art Music
- Other tracks are published by Young Star Music Publishing / N. Star Publishing / Musicallstars

== Personnel ==
- "Colour My Eyes"
  - Additional Bass and Guitar By: Steven Breukel
  - Vocal Producer: Lucien Foort
  - Vocals By: Celine Frewer
  - Written and Composed By: Celine Frewer & Lucien Foort
- "Talk Like A Stranger"
  - Written and Composed By: Jason Blum, Jes Brieden & Jesse Scott Giaquinta
- "Be With U"
  - Vocal Producer: Lucien Foort
  - Vocals By: Celine Frewer
  - Written and Composed By: Celine Frewer & Lucien Foort
- "One Moon Circling"
  - Vocal Producer: Jes Brieden
  - Vocals By: Jes Brieden
  - Additional Producer: Mike Olsen
  - Written and Composed By: Jes Brieden & Mike Olsen
