= Magik Muzik =

Sub-label of Black Hole Recordings

- Parent company: Black Hole Recordings
- Founded: 2001
- Founder: Tijs Verwest
- Genre: Electronica; dance; house; trance; progressive trance
- Country of origin: Netherlands
- Official website: blackholerecordings.com/labels/magik-muzik

Magik Muzik is a sub-label of Dutch label Black Hole Recordings that was founded by Tiësto in 2001.

== History ==
In 1997 with the help of Arny Bink, co-founder of Black Hole Recordings, Tiësto was able to compile various styles of electronic music like trance, techno and house. Tiësto decided to create a sub-label, known as Magik Muzik. The label began releasing Tiësto's own releases, but it has also released tracks for The Filterheadz, Oliver Lieb, Mark Norman, and Mojado. The label became a trademark which stands for high quality electronic dance music which was due to the release of Tiësto's classic dance anthem "Flight 643" in 2001.

Later on he included the work of other acclaimed artists like Jes Brieden and Phynn. Its first album release was a limited vinyl edition of Tiësto's first studio album In My Memory which is considered an LP, the special edition released in 2001 did not include the complete album which was released later that same year; The long play version has a catalog number of Magik Muzik 800 followed by the Magik Muzik 801 releases, known as "Flight 643" which is the labels pride and first release. "Gatex" by Umek is the first song which does not belong to Tiësto and was released through the record label Potential first, it was later remixed by Tiësto, DJ Montana, Oliver Lieb, and DJ Le Blanc and it was included in Magik Muzik's vinyl releases which by this time had gained success and support across Europe in 2002.

In October 2004 the label released Tiësto Presents Magik Muzik which is a compilation of 10 previously released songs and singles which gained great success and was released through XMAG Magazine and DJ Magazine's issue 354 on November 28, 2003.

"Everything on Magik Muzik is what you'll find in my sets, which makes it more of my own little project."

— says Tiësto.

Magik Muzik also had a record store, known us "Magik Muzik The Store", but it closed down in 2006. In 2008, its parent company Black Hole Recordings was nominated at the WMC Awards in Miami, Florida for Best Global Dance Record Label. Much of Black Hole's success is due to its owner Tiësto who has released all his projects in it.

=== Artists ===
- 7AHA & Gallen Rho
- Acaya
- Alex Kunnari
- Alex O'Rion
- Alex Seda
- Allure
- Amurai
- Andain
- Andy Duguid
- Andy Moor
- Antonio Moreno
- Au5
- Batdorf & Rodney
- Beat Service
- Beltek
- Betsie Larkin
- Blake Lewis
- Bobina
- BoomriSe
- BT
- Christian Falero
- Christina Novelli
- Daniel Wanrooy
- Danny Howard
- Dave Silcox
- Dean Newton
- Dennis Sheperd
- Dinka
- DJ Cor Fijneman
- DJ Feel
- D.O.D.
- Driftmoon
- Emilio Fernandez
- Evil Twin
- Eximinds
- Fatum
- Ferry Tayle
- Filterheadz
- First State
- Fox MacLeod
- Fred Baker
- G & A Project
- Game Chasers
- Garmiani
- Glenn Morrison
- HAKA
- Heaven's Cry
- Hippocoon
- Ido
- Inpetto
- J-Soul
- Jake Shanahan
- JES
- Johan Gielen
- Johnny Monsoon
- Jonas Steur
- Julie Thompson
- Kim Fai
- Lea Luna
- Lema
- LNG
- Loverush UK!
- Mac & Mac
- Manufactured Superstars
- Mark Norman
- Mark Sherry
- MC Flipside
- Mell Tierra
- Menno De Jong
- Modifiers
- Mojado
- Mr. Sam
- Nerq
- Noah Neiman
- Oliver Lang
- Ollin Kan
- Patrick Hagenaar
- Patrick Plaice
- Paul Thomas
- Paul van Dyk
- Phoenyx
- Propylon
- PureNRG
- Quench
- Quivver
- Richard Beynon
- Richard Durand
- Richard J. Dalton
- Richard Vission
- Roger Shah
- Salvatore Ganacci
- Sied van Riel
- Sir Llewy Project
- Save The Robot
- Scott Mac
- Sebastien Bruce
- Sephano & Torio
- Shafer
- Simon Lee & Alvin
- Sisto
- Solarstone
- Somna
- Steve Kaetzel
- Steve Smooth
- Stereojackers vs. Mark Loverush
- Sunlounger
- Tamra Keenan
- Tenishia
- The Ambush
- Thomas Mengel
- Tiësto
- Tom Cloud
- Torio
- Umek
- Vada
- Venice
- Victoria Aitken
- Whelan & Di Scala
- Yves-V
- Zen Freeman
- Zero Point
- Zoo Brazil

== Catalog ==
=== Albums ===
- Magik Muzik CD 01 Tiësto – In My Memory (CD, Album)
- Magik Muzik CD 02 Tiësto – In My Memory (2xCD, Album)
- Magik Muzik CD 03 Tiësto – Just Be (CD, Album)
- Magik Muzik CD 03RD Tiësto – Just Be: Remixed (CD, Album)
- Magik Muzik CD 04 Tiësto – Parade of the Athletes (CD, Album)
- Magik Muzik CD 05 Mojado – Arena (CD, Album)
- Magik Muzik CD 06 Mark Norman – Synchronicity (CD + CD, Album + Mixed)
- Magik Muzik CD 07 Tiësto – Elements of Life (CD, Album)
- Magik Muzik CD 08 JES – Disconnect (CD, Album)
- Magik Muzik CD 09 Mark Norman – Colours (CD, Album)
- Magik Muzik CD 10 Mojado – Skizo (CD, Album)
- Magik Muzik CD 11 JES – Into The Dawn (The Hits Disconnected) (CD, Album)
- Magik Muzik CD 12 Tiësto – Elements of Life: Remixed (CD, Album)
- Magik Muzik CD 13 Richard Durand – Always The Sun (CD, Album)
- Magik Muzik CD 14 Julie Thompson – Feeling For Corners (CD, Album)
- Magik Muzik CD 15 Zoo Brazil – Please Don't Panic (CD, Album)
- Magik Muzik CD 16 JES – Highglow (CD, Album)
- Magik Muzik CD 17 Tiësto – Magikal Journey: The Hits Collection 1998–2008 (2xCD, Compilation)
- Magik Muzik CD 18 First State – Changing Lanes (CD, Album)
- Magik Muzik CD 19 Richard Durand – Wide Awake (CD, Album)
- Magik Muzik CD 20 JES – Unleash The Beat (CD, Mixed)
- Magik Muzik CD 21 Allure – Kiss From The Past (CD, Album)
- Magik Muzik CD 22 Zoo Brazil – Songs For Clubs (CD, Mixed)
- Magik Muzik CD 23 First State – The Whole Nine Yards (2xCD, Mixed)
- Magik Muzik CD 24 Manufactured Superstars – Freak On You EP (CD, EP)
- Magik Muzik CD 25 Zoo Brazil – Any Moment Now (CD, Album)
- Magik Muzik CD 26 Richard Durand – Richard Durand Versus The World (CD, Album)
- Magik Muzik CD 27 Allure – Kiss From The Past (The Remix Album) (CD, Album)
- Magik Muzik CD 28 First State – The Whole Nine Yards 2 (Jakarta – Amsterdam) (2xCD, Mixed)
- Magik Muzik CD 29 Bobina – Same Difference (CD, Album)
- Magik Muzik CD 30 Emilio Fernandez – Suite 16 (CD, Album)
- Magik Muzik CD 31 JES – Unleash The Beat 2 (2xCD, Mixed)
- Magik Muzik CD 32 Andy Duguid – On The Edge (CD, Album)
- Magik Muzik CD 33 Zoo Brazil – Songs For Clubs 2 (CD, Mixed)

=== Vinyl ===
This list contains the vinyl released in Magik Muzik.

- Magik Muzik 800 Tiësto – In My Memory (Limited vinyl edition)
- Magik Muzik 801 Tiësto – Flight 643
- Magik Muzik 802 Tiësto – Suburban Train
- Magik Muzik 803 Tiësto – Urban Train
- Magik Muzik 804 Tiësto – Lethal Industry
- Magik Muzik 805 Tiësto – In My Memory
- Magik Muzik 806 Tiësto – 643 (Love's on Fire)
- Magik Muzik 807 Umek – Gatex
- Magik Muzik 808 Tiësto & Junkie XL – Obsession
- Magik Muzik 809 Mr. Sam vs. Fred Baker Present As One – Forever Waiting
- Magik Muzik 810 Filterheadz Present Orange 3 – In Your Eyes
- Magik Muzik 811 Mark Norman – Stream
- Magik Muzik 812 The Ambush – Acapulco
- Magik Muzik 813 Fred Baker – My Thing
- Magik Muzik 814 Tiësto – Traffic
- Magik Muzik 815 Mojado – Naranja
- Magik Muzik 816 Mark Norman – Phantom Manor / Rush
- Magik Muzik 817 Tiësto – Love Comes Again
- Magik Muzik 818 Mojado – El Toro
- Magik Muzik 819 Estuera – Tales From The South
- Magik Muzik 820 Tiësto – Just Be
- Magik Muzik 821 Tiësto – Just Be (Wally Lopez Remixes)
- Magik Muzik 822 Mojado – Señorita
- Magik Muzik 823 Tiësto – Adagio For Strings
- Magik Muzik 824 Tiësto – Adagio For Strings
- Magik Muzik 825 Mojado – El Matador
- Magik Muzik 826 Tiësto – UR/A Tear in the Open
- Magik Muzik 827 Mark Norman – Touch Down / False Vegas
- Magik Muzik 828 Allure – The Loves We Lost
- Magik Muzik 829 Solarstone & JES – Like A Waterfall
- Magik Muzik 830 Mojado – Arena
- Magik Muzik 831 Mark Norman – Brasília
- Magik Muzik 832 Progression – Technophobia / Loving Memories
- Magik Muzik 833 Tiësto – Dance4Life
- Magik Muzik 834 Tiësto – Dance4Life (Fonzerelli & Global Experience Remixes)
- Magik Muzik 835 Tiësto – Lethal Industry / Flight 643 (Richard Durand Remixes)
- Magik Muzik 836 JES – Ghost
- Magik Muzik 837 Tiësto – In The Dark
- Magik Muzik 838 Mark Norman – Ventura
- Magik Muzik 839 Mojado – Skizo Limited 1/4
- Magik Muzik 840 Mojado – Skizo Limited 2/4
- Magik Muzik 841 Mojado – Skizo Limited 3/4
- Magik Muzik 842 Mojado – Skizo Limited 4/4
- Magik Muzik 843 Mark Norman – Niagara
- Magik Muzik 844 JES – Ghost (The Remixes)
- Magik Muzik 845 Tiësto – Break My Fall
- Magik Muzik 846 Tiësto – Break My Fall (Remixes)
- Magik Muzik 847 Mark Norman – Blikken Machine
- Magik Muzik 848 JES – Heaven
- Magik Muzik 849 Allure – Somewhere Inside
- Magik Muzik 850 Solarstone & JES – Like A Waterfall (Gift & Kostas K Remixes)
- Magik Muzik 851 JES – People Will Go (Steve Forte Rio Remix)
- Magik Muzik 852 Mark Norman – Be With U
- Magik Muzik 853 Mojado – Free Your Mind
- Magik Muzik 854
- Magik Muzik 855 Mark Norman – Phantom Manor
- Magik Muzik 856 Mark Norman – Bazarus
- Magik Muzik 857 JES – Imagination
- Magik Muzik 858 Mark Norman – Restart
- Magik Muzik 859 Allure – Power of You
- Magik Muzik 860 Mojado – Too High
- Magik Muzik 861 Patrick Plaice & Frank Ellrich – Sticky Tape
- Magik Muzik 862 Richard Durand – Into Something
- Magik Muzik 863 Mark Norman vs. Hole In One – Life's Too Short (2009)
- Magik Muzik 864 Richard Durand – Always The Sun
- Magik Muzik 865 Patrick Plaice – Falling Out
- Magik Muzik 866 Mark Norman – Coffee Break
- Magik Muzik 867
- Magik Muzik 868 Mac & Mac – Solid Session
- Magik Muzik 869 Julie Thompson – It Only Hurts
- Magik Muzik 870 Richard Durand – No Way Home
- Magik Muzik 871 Fred Baker – Ibiza Project 2009
- Magik Muzik 872 First State – Brave
- Magik Muzik 873 Mark Norman – Confuse
- Magik Muzik 874 Scott Mac – Damager 02
- Magik Muzik 875 Patrick Plaice – Flash Forward
- Magik Muzik 876 Johan Gielen – Repeat The Music
- Magik Muzik 877 Richard Durand – Silver Key
- Magik Muzik 878 Julie Thompson – What Will I Do
- Magik Muzik 879 First State – Brave (Second Mix)
- Magik Muzik 880 JES – Lovesong
- Magik Muzik 881 JES – Chanson D'Amour
- Magik Muzik 882 Zoo Brazil – You Can Have It All
- Magik Muzik 883 Richard Durand – Xelerate
- Magik Muzik 884 Alex Kunnari & Heikki L – Rising
- Magik Muzik 885 Johan Gielen – These Are My People
- Magik Muzik 886 Tiësto – Goldrush
- Magik Muzik 887 Tiësto – Magikal Circus
- Magik Muzik 888 Mark Norman – Fobiac
- Magik Muzik 889 Beat Service – Hiding To Nothing
- Magik Muzik 890 Fred Baker pres. Saona – Saona
- Magik Muzik 891 Richard Durand – Tiger's Apology
- Magik Muzik 892 First State – Cape Point
- Magik Muzik 893 Johan Gielen – I'm Lonely
- Magik Muzik 894 Whelan & Di Scala – Achilles
- Magik Muzik 895 First State – As You Were
- Magik Muzik 896 JES – Closer
- Magik Muzik 897 Alex Kunnari & Heikki L – Brand New Day
- Magik Muzik 898 Mark Norman – Actual Events
- Magik Muzik 899 Julie Thompson – Shine
- Magik Muzik 900 Zero Point – Kineticut
- Magik Muzik 901 Richard Durand – Night & Day
- Magik Muzik 902 Johan Gielen – I'm Lonely (Marc Lime & K. Bastian Remix)
- Magik Muzik 903 Zoo Brazil – There Is Hope
- Magik Muzik 904 Fred Baker pres. Saona – I Miss U
- Magik Muzik 905 First State – Cross The Line
- Magik Muzik 906 J-Soul – Follow Changes
- Magik Muzik 907 Julie Thompson – Shine (Kid Massive 3AM Mix)
- Magik Muzik 908 JES – Awaken
- Magik Muzik 909 Johan Gielen – Jonko
- Magik Muzik 910 Richard Durand – Dryland
- Magik Muzik 911 JES – Awaken (Remixes)
- Magik Muzik 912 First State – Reverie
- Magik Muzik 913 Johan Gielen – I'm Lonely (Eric van Kleef Remixes)
- Magik Muzik 914 Richard Durand – Wide Awake
- Magik Muzik 915 Yves V vs. Fred Baker – Start Again / Phase 1
- Magik Muzik 916 Glenn Morrison – Tokyo Cries
- Magik Muzik 917 JES – Despierta
- Magik Muzik 918 Richard Durand – Robotic / Real Deal
- Magik Muzik 919 Dean Newton – Phazin
- Magik Muzik 920 LNG – Harmony Will Kick You In The Ass
- Magik Muzik 921 Richard Durand feat. Ellie Lawson – Wide Awake
- Magik Muzik 922 Manufactured Superstars – Angry Circus / Drummer Drums
- Magik Muzik 923 Richard Durand – Explode
- Magik Muzik 924 First State – Skies On Fire
- Magik Muzik 925 Manufactured Superstars – Take Me Over
- Magik Muzik 926 Allure – Show Me The Way
- Magik Muzik 927 Alex Kunnari – Lost
- Magik Muzik 928 Save The Robot – Compassion
- Magik Muzik 929 Amurai – Killing Me Inside
- Magik Muzik 930 Fred Baker – Never Let Me Go
- Magik Muzik 931 LNG – Hoover Damn
- Magik Muzik 932 Manufactured Superstars – Serious
- Magik Muzik 933 Manufactured Superstars – Serious (Remixes)
- Magik Muzik 934 J-Soul feat. Rave Channel – Deeper
- Magik Muzik 935 JES – It's Too Late
- Magik Muzik 936 Blake Lewis – Till We See The Sun
- Magik Muzik 937 Allure feat. Christian Burns – On The Wire
- Magik Muzik 938
- Magik Muzik 939 Alex Kunnari – You And Me
- Magik Muzik 940 Fox MacLeod – Zinc
- Magik Muzik 941 Andy Duguid feat. Fenja – Strings
- Magik Muzik 942 First State feat. Tyler Sherritt – Maze
- Magik Muzik 943 Alex Kunnari – Music
- Magik Muzik 944 JES & Ronski Speed – Can't Stop
- Magik Muzik 945
- Magik Muzik 946 Manufactured Superstars – Drunk Text
- Magik Muzik 947 Manufactured Superstars – Drunk Text (Remixes)
- Magik Muzik 948 JES – It's Too Late
- Magik Muzik 949 Tiësto – Love Comes Again / Flight 643 / Traffic
- Magik Muzik 950 Mark Norman – Rebound
- Magik Muzik 951 First State feat. Tyler Sherritt – Maze (Remixes)
- Magik Muzik 952 Zoo Brazil feat. Rasmus Kellerman – There Is Hope
- Magik Muzik 953 Alex Kunnari feat. Ben Andreas – Taste The Sun
- Magik Muzik 954 JES – Ghost (TyDi Remix)
- Magik Muzik 955 Richard Durand – Richard Durand vs. The World EP 1: Asia / Australia
- Magik Muzik 956 Manufactured Superstars & Jeziel Quintela feat. Christian Burns – Silver Splits The Blue
- Magik Muzik 957 Allure – I Am
- Magik Muzik 958 JES & Andy Duguid – Before You Go
- Magik Muzik 959 Julie Thompson & Leon Bolier – Underwater
- Magik Muzik 960 Tiësto – Lethal Industry (Sebastien Bruce Remix)
- Magik Muzik 961 Bobina – Diamond Hell
- Magik Muzik 962 Dave Silcox feat. Amy Pearson – This Is Love
- Magik Muzik 963 Vada – Mainline
- Magik Muzik 964 Alex Kunnari – Colors
- Magik Muzik 965 Patrick Hagenaar – Bangers N Mash / Undutchable
- Magik Muzik 966 Allure feat. Emma Hewitt – Stay Forever
- Magik Muzik 967 Victoria Aitken – Weekend Lover
- Magik Muzik 968 Phoenyx & Kunala – Feel
- Magik Muzik 969 Richard Durand – Trancefusion
- Magik Muzik 970 Richard Durand – Richard Durand vs. The World EP 2: Europe
- Magik Muzik 971 Bobina – Diamond Hell (Remixes)
- Magik Muzik 972 Andy Duguid feat. Shannon Hurley – I Want To Believe
- Magik Muzik 973 Bobina – Quattro 372
- Magik Muzik 974 Danny Howard – Adagio For Strings / Follow
- Magik Muzik 975 D.O.D – Hands / Smash Tash
- Magik Muzik 976 Manufactured Superstars & LA Riots feat. Selina Albright – Born To Rock
- Magik Muzik 977 Quivver feat. Lea Luna – Arrest The DJ
- Magik Muzik 978 Julie Thompson & MaRLo – Broken Wing
- Magik Muzik 979 Richard Durand – Richard Durand vs. The World – North America
- Magik Muzik 980 Oliver Lang – Coastline
- Magik Muzik 981 Andy Duguid feat. Lizzie Curious – Music Box
- Magik Muzik 982 Bobina – Quattro 372 (Remixes)
- Magik Muzik 983 Paul Thomas feat. Ladystation – Motivation
- Magik Muzik 984 Mark Norman – Phantom Manor (Remixes)
- Magik Muzik 985 Allure feat. Jeza – You Say It'll Be Okay
- Magik Muzik 986 Quivver feat. Lea Luna – Arrest The DJ (Remixes)
- Magik Muzik 987 Sir Llewy Project – Weekend Awaits Me
- Magik Muzik 988 Beltek – Go!
- Magik Muzik 989 Bobina – The Space Track
- Magik Muzik 990 Manufactured Superstars feat. Arianny Celeste – Top Of The World
- Magik Muzik 991 Richard Durand – Richard Durand vs. The World – Africa & Middle East
- Magik Muzik 992 Bobina feat. Betsie Larkin – No Substitute For You
- Magik Muzik 993 First State feat. Max'C – Holding On
- Magik Muzik 994 Steve Smooth & Tony Arzadon feat. Tamra Keenan – All You And I
- Magik Muzik 995 Manufactured Superstars feat. Arianny Celeste – Top Of The World (Remixes)
- Magik Muzik 996 Alex Kunnari feat. Jon Hall – Sweet Melody
- Magik Muzik 997 Mark Norman vs. Hole In One – Life's Too Short 2009 (Alexx Rave Remix)
- Magik Muzik 998 MC Flipside – Draganno vs. Zero
- Magik Muzik 999 Bobina – The Space Track (Andrew Rayel Remix)
- Magik Muzik 1000 First State & Jake Shanahan – Why So Serious
- Magik Muzik 1001 Richard Durand & Pedro Del Mar feat. Roberta Harrison – Paint The Sky
- Magik Muzik 1002 Alex O'Rion – Tornado
- Magik Muzik 1003 Richard Durand – Richard Durand vs. The World – South America
- Magik Muzik 1004 Andy Duguid & Julie Thompson – Skin & Bones
- Magik Muzik 1005
- Magik Muzik 1006
- Magik Muzik 1007 Paul Thomas feat. Ladystation – Motivation (Remixes)
- Magik Muzik 1008 Tiësto – Lethal Industry (Sterbinszky & Coddie Remix)
- Magik Muzik 1009 Alex O'Rion – The Friendly Giant
- Magik Muzik 1010 D.O.D – Generation / Let's Rock
- Magik Muzik 1011
- Magik Muzik 1012 Steve Smooth, Sephano & Torio feat. Jenny G – This Is The Night
- Magik Muzik 1013 Tiësto – Love Comes Again (Remixes)
- Magik Muzik 1014 Mell Tierra feat. Maegan Cottone – The Greatest
- Magik Muzik 1015 Garmiani & Salvatore Ganacci – The City Is Mine
- Magik Muzik 1016 Zoo Brazil feat. Ursula Rucker – Give Myself
- Magik Muzik 1017 Steve Kaetzel & Johnny Monsoon feat. Emma Lock – Winter
- Magik Muzik 1018 MC Flipside – Draganno (Remixes)
- Magik Muzik 1019 Manufactured Superstars – Zombies In Love
- Magik Muzik 1020 JES – Unleash The Beat (Remixes)
- Magik Muzik 1021 Richard Durand – Destination Prague
- Magik Muzik 1022 Bobina feat. Betsie Larkin – No Substitute For You (Remixes)
- Magik Muzik 1023 Ido – Fully Charged EP
- Magik Muzik 1024 First State feat. Sarah Howells – Seeing Stars
- Magik Muzik 1025 Steve Smooth, Sephano & Torio feat. Jenny G – This Is The Night (Tony Arzadon Remix)
- Magik Muzik 1026 Allure feat. Emma Hewitt – No Goodbyes
- Magik Muzik 1027 Alex O'Rion – Sunchaser
- Magik Muzik 1028 Bobina feat. Mariske Hekkenberg – Slow MMXIII
- Magik Muzik 1029 Richard Beynon & Zen Freeman feat. CeCe Peniston – All My Love
- Magik Muzik 1030 Christian Falero & Alex Seda – Smile
- Magik Muzik 1031 Kim Fai – The Eagle Has Landed
- Magik Muzik 1032 Emilio Fernandez feat. Jones – Closer To Me
- Magik Muzik 1033
- Magik Muzik 1034 Fred Baker – A New Life On Earth
- Magik Muzik 1035 Emilio Fernandez feat. Jones – Closer To Me (Remixes)
- Magik Muzik 1036 Tamra Keenan – Pontius Pilate
- Magik Muzik 1037
- Magik Muzik 1038 First State feat. Sarah Howells – Seeing Stars (Remixes)
- Magik Muzik 1039 First State – Humanoid
- Magik Muzik 1040 Richard Durand – Radical
- Magik Muzik 1041 Richard Durand – Trancematic
- Magik Muzik 1042 Mell Tierra – Get Down
- Magik Muzik 1043 Richard Durand – L.A. ROCK!
- Magik Muzik 1044 Emilio Fernandez with DJ Feel – Diggin' This Feeling
- Magik Muzik 1045 Bobina – Basque The Dog
- Magik Muzik 1046 Save The Robot – Kai Zen
- Magik Muzik 1047 Garmiani & Salvatore Ganacci – The City Is Mine (Remixes)
- Magik Muzik 1048 Tiësto – Adagio For Strings (Blasterjaxx Remix)
- Magik Muzik 1049 Julie Thompson & Super8 & Tab – Your Secret's Safe
- Magik Muzik 1050 Roger Shah & Brian Laruso feat. JES – Higher Than The Sun
- Magik Muzik 1051 Bobina – Basque The Dog (Remixes)
- Magik Muzik 1052 Kim Fai & Dom Kane – Moon
- Magik Muzik 1053 Loverush UK feat. Bryan Adams – Tonight In Babylon 2013
- Magik Muzik 1054 Alex O'Rion – Don't Look Back
- Magik Muzik 1055 Save The Robot – Ready 4 Love
- Magik Muzik 1056
- Magik Muzik 1057 EC Twins & Nejat Barton feat. Lea Luna – Hot Summer Nights
- Magik Muzik 1058
- Magik Muzik 1059
- Magik Muzik 1060 Patrick Hagenaar feat. Sarah McLeod – Magik
- Magik Muzik 1061 First State feat. Fenja – Battle Of Hearts

This list contains the vinyl released in Magik Muzik UK.

- MMUK001 Umek – Gatex
- MMUK002 Mr. Sam vs. Fred Baker Present As One – Forever Waiting
- MMUK003 Filterheadz Present Orange 3 – In Your Eyes
- MMUK004 Mark Norman – Stream
- MMUK005 Fred Baker – My Thing

=== Long Plays ===
- Magik Muzik LP 03 Tiësto – Just Be (4xLP, Ltd, Album, Col)
- Magik Muzik LP 04 Tiësto – Parade of the Athletes (4xLP, Ltd, Album, Whi)
- Magik Muzik LP 05 Mojado – Arena (4xLP, Ltd, Album, Red)
- Magik Muzik LP 06 Mark Norman – Synchronicity (4xLP, Ltd, Album, Blu)
- Magik Muzik LP 07 Tiësto – Elements of Life (4xLP, Ltd, Album)
- Magik Muzik LP 12 Tiësto – Elements of Life: Remixed (2xLP, Album)

== See also ==
List of electronic music record labels
