= Obsession (Tiësto and Junkie XL song) =

- Obsession single cover

Single by Tiësto and Junkie XL

from the album In My Memory
- Released: 2002
- Recorded: 2001
- Genre: Tech trance
- Length: 9:06
- Label: Magik Muzik; Black Hole
- Songwriters: Tijs Verwest; Thomas Holkenborg
- Producers: Tiësto; Junkie XL

Tiësto singles chronology
"643 (Love's on Fire)" (2002)	"Obsession" (2002)	"In My Memory" (2002)

Junkie XL singles chronology
"A Little Less Conversation" (2002)	"Obsession" (2002)	"Beauty Never Fades" / "Breezer" (2002)

"Obsession" is a single which appeared on DJ Tiësto's first album, In My Memory in 2001, the track features the production of Tom Holkenborg also known as Junkie XL. The song was recorded at the Computer Hell Cabin, Amsterdam.

== Formats and track listings ==
=== CD, Maxi Singles ===
United Kingdom Maxi Single

1. "Obsession" (Original Mix) - 6:58
2. "Obsession" (Filterheadz Remix) - 6:40
3. "Obsession" (Frank Biazzi Remix) - 6:02

United Kingdom, Germany Maxi Single

1. "Obsession" (Original Full Length Mix) - 6:59
2. "Obsession" (Frank Biazzi Remix) - 6:06
3. "Obsession" (Filterheadz Remix) - 8:23
4. "Obsession" (Robin Hill Code Blue Remix) - 7:36
5. "Obsession" (Nubreed Remix) - 9:08

Sweden Maxi Single

1. "Obsession" (Radio Edit Version 1)
2. "Obsession" (Radio Edit Version 2)
3. "Obsession" (Frank Biazzi Remix) - 6:02
4. "Obsession" (Filterheadz Remix) - 6:40
5. "Obsession" (Original Version) - 6:59
6. "Obsession" (Nubreed Remix) - 9:08

=== 12" Vinyl ===
Magik Muzik, Electropolis 12" Vinyl

1. "Obsession" (Frank Biazzi Remix) - 7:00
2. "Obsession" (Filterheadz Remix) - 8:18

Nebula 12" Vinyl

1. "Obsession" (Filterheadz Remix) - 8:18
2. "Obsession" (Nubreed Remix) - 9:08

Nebula 12" Vinyl

1. "Obsession" (Original Full Length Mix) - 6:59
2. "Obsession" (Frank Biazzi Remix) - 6:06

== Charts ==
Chart (2002)	Peak position
UK Singles Chart	56

== Official versions ==
- Radio Edit Version 1
- Radio Edit Version 2
- Frank Biazzi Remix (7:00)
- Filterheadz Remix (8:18)
- Original Version (6:59)
- Robin Hill Code Blue Remix (7:36)
- Nubreed Remix (9:08)

== Release history ==
Region	Date	Label	Format	Catalog
United Kingdom	November 18, 2002	Nebula	CD, Maxi	NEBCD029
United Kingdom	November 18, 2002	Nebula	vinyl, 12"	NEBT029
United Kingdom	November 18, 2002	Nebula	vinyl, 12"	NEBTX029
United Kingdom	2003	Nebula	CDr, Promo	none
United Kingdom	2002	Nebula	vinyl, 12", Promo	NEBDJ029
United Kingdom	2002	Nebula	vinyl, 12", Promo	NEBDJX029
Netherlands	2002	Magik Muzik	vinyl, 12"	Magik Muzik 808-5
Sweden	2002	Playground Music Scandinavia	CD, Maxi, Promo	none
Germany	2002	Jive	vinyl, 12"	RTD 103.4078.0
Spain	2003	Electropolis	vinyl, 12"	VLMX 1427-3
