= Suburban Train/Urban Train =

"Suburban Train" / "Urban Train"

Single by DJ Tiësto

from the album In My Memory
- Released: November 6, 2001
- Genre: Progressive trance
- Length: 10:22
- Label: Magik Muzik
- Composer(s): Tijs Verwest; Ronald van Gelderen
- Lyricist(s): Kirsty Hawkshaw; Tom Greenwood ("Urban Train" only)
- Producer(s): DJ Tiësto; Kid Vicious

DJ Tiësto singles chronology
"Lethal Industry" (1999)	"Suburban Train" / "Urban Train" (2001)	"Flight 643" (2001)

"Suburban Train" / "Urban Train" is a double A-side single by DJ Tiësto, from his debut album In My Memory. "Suburban Train" was produced by Kid Vicious (Ronald van Gelderen). The vocal version, titled "Urban Train", contains vocals by Kirsty Hawkshaw written by Kirsty and Tom Greenwood. The original single was released with remixes from German DJ Marc O'Tool, and English group Way Out West.

"Suburban Train" was mixed with Armin van Buuren's song "Yet Another Day" in a famous "Armin van Buuren Mash-Up" which is known officially as "Yet Another Suburban Train" or simply "Another Suburban Train".

"Suburban Train" is heavily based on Ronald van Gelderen's track "Re-Form", which was released in 2000 under the alias Kid Vicious along with a remix by Tiësto.

== Formats and track listings ==
=== CD, Maxi Singles ===
Netherlands Maxi Single

1. "Suburban Train" (Radio Edit) - 3:26
2. "Suburban Train" (Original) - 9:23
3. "Suburban Train" (Way Out West Remix) - 8:48
4. "Urban Train (Marc O'Tool Main Remix) - 9:01
5. "Suburban Train" (Marc O'Tool Instrumental) - 8:58

Scandinavia Maxi Single

1. "Suburban Train" (Original) - 10:27
2. "Suburban Train" (Way Out West Remix) - 8:42
3. "Urban Train" (Marc O'Tool Main Remix) - 9:02
4. "Urban Train" (Marc O'Tool Dub Mix) - 8:06
5. "Suburban Train" (Marc O'Tool Instrumental) - 9:02
6. "Urban Train" (Radio Edit) - 3:01
7. "Suburban Train" (Radio Edit) - 2:59

United States Maxi Single

1. "Urban Train" (Marc O'Tool Radio Edit) - 2:58
2. "Suburban Train" (Original Version) - 10:25
3. "Suburban Train" (Way Out West Remix) - 8:50
4. "Urban Train" (Marc O'Tool Main Mix) - 8:59
5. "Urban Train" (Marc O'Tool Main Dub) - 8:04

United Kingdom Maxi Single

1. "Urban Train" (Vocal Edit) - 3:00
2. "Suburban Train" (Original Mix) - 9:16
3. "Suburban Train" (Way Out West Remix) - 7:39

Germany

1. "Urban Train" (Wippenberg Radio Edit) - 3:52
2. "Urban Train" (Cosmic Gate Remix) - 7:44
3. "Urban Train" (Wippenberg Remix) - 6:59
4. "Urban Train" (Marc O'Tool Main Remix) - 8:59
5. "Urban Train" (Marc O'Tool Dub Remix) - 8:02

=== 12" Vinyl ===
Magik Muzik 12" Vinyl

1. "Lethal Industry" –6:45
2. "Suburban Train" –10:24

Magik Muzik 12" Vinyl

1. "Suburban Train" (Original Mix) - 10:24
2. "Suburban Train" (Way Out West Remix)–8:42
3. "Urban Train" (Marc O'Tool Remix)–8:59
4. "Suburban Train" (Marc O'Tool Instrumental)–9:01

Magik Muzik 12" Vinyl

1. "Urban Train" (Cosmic Gate Remix)
2. "Urban Train" (Wippenberg Dub Mix)

Magik Muzik 12" Vinyl

1. "Suburban Train" (Radio Edit) - 3:26
2. "Suburban Train" (Original) - 9:23

Nettwerk America 12" Vinyl

1. "Suburban Train" (Original Version) - 10:25
2. "Suburban Train" (Way Out West Remix) - 8:50
3. "Suburban Train" (Marc O' Tool Main Mix) - 8:59

VC Recordings 12" Vinyl

1. "Suburban Train" (Original Mix) - 10:25
2. "Urban Train" (Marc O'Tool Dub) - 8:04

VC Recordings 12" Vinyl

1. "Urban Train" (Vocal Edit) - 2:58
2. "Urban Train" (Instrumental) - 2:58

VC Recordings 12" Vinyl

1. "Suburban Train" (Way Out West Remix) - 8:50
2. "Suburban Train" (Marc O'Tool Instrumental) - 9:00

Independence Records, Nebula 12" Vinyl

1. "Suburban Train" (Original Mix) - 8:25
2. "Urban Train" (Cosmic Gate Remix) - 7:44

Independence Records, Universal Licensing Music (ULM) 12" Vinyl

1. "Suburban Train" (Original 12" Version) - 10:22
2. "Suburban Train" (Marc O'Tool Instrumental) - 8:58

Dos Or Die Recordings 12" Vinyl

1. "Urban Train" (Wippenberg Remix) - 6:59
2. "Urban Train" (Cosmic Gate Remix) - 7:44

=== Urban Train/Flight 643 ===
Dos Or Die Recordings 12" Vinyl

1. "Urban Train" (Original Mix) - 9:20
2. "Flight 643" (Original Mix) - 9:04

Dos Or Die Recordings 12" Vinyl

1. "Suburban Train" (Marc O'Tool Main Remix)
2. "Flight 643" (Oliver Klein Remix) - 9:27

Dos Or Die Recordings 12" Vinyl

1. "Urban Train" (Radio Edit) - 3:24
2. "Flight 643" (Radio Edit) - 2:52
3. "Urban Train" (Original Mix) - 8:25
4. "Flight 643" (Original Mix) - 6:18

== Charts ==
Chart (2002)	Peak position
US Billboard Hot Dance Club Play	23
Netherlands Singles Chart	34
UK Singles Chart	22
Germany Singles Chart	88
Finnish Singles Chart	20

== Official versions ==
Suburban Train

- Armin van Buuren Mash-Up
- Radio Edit (3:25)
- Original Mix (10:27)
- Marc O'Tool Instrumental (8:58)
- Way Out West Remix (8:48)

Urban Train

- Cosmic Gate Remix (7:44)
- Instrumental (2:58)
- Marc O'Tool Dub (8:04)
- Marc O'Tool Main Remix (9:01)
- Vocal Edit (2:58)
- Wippenberg Remix (6:59)
- Wippenberg Radio Edit (3:52)

== Release history ==
Region	Date	Label	Format	Catalog
Netherlands	November 16, 2001	Magik Muzik	12", vinyl	BHMM 804-4
Netherlands	November 16, 2001	Magik Muzik	2 x 12", vinyl	Magik Muzik 802-5
Netherlands	November 16, 2001	Magik Muzik	CD, Maxi	Magik Muzik 802-2
Netherlands	November 16, 2001	Magik Muzik	CD, Single	Magik Muzik 802-1
Netherlands	November 16, 2001	Magik Muzik	12", vinyl	Magik Muzik 803-5
Scandinavia	2001	Playground Music Scandinavia	CD, Maxi	MAGIK MUZIK 802-2
Sweden	2002	Playground Music Scandinavia	CDr	none
United States	November 6, 2001	Nettwerk America	CD, Maxi	0 6700 33140 2 2
United States	November 6, 2001	Nettwerk America	12", vinyl	0 6700 33140 1 5
Germany	December, 2001	Jive	CD, Maxi	RTD 103.9865.3
Germany	January 21, 2002	Jive	CD, Maxi	RTD 103.3865.3
Germany	November, 2001	Dos Or Die Recordings	12", vinyl	DOS 199
Germany	2001	Dos Or Die Recordings	12", vinyl	DOS 195
Germany	2002	Dos Or Die Recordings	12", vinyl	DOS 185
United Kingdom	September 17, 2001	VC Recordings	CD, Maxi	VCRD 95
United Kingdom	September 17, 2001	VC Recordings	CDr, Single, Promo	none
United Kingdom	September 17, 2001	VC Recordings	12", vinyl	VCRT 095
United Kingdom	September 17, 2001	VC Recordings	CD, Single, Promo	VCRDDJ 95
United Kingdom	September 17, 2001	VC Recordings	12", vinyl	VCRTX 095
United Kingdom	September 10, 2001	VC Recordings	12", vinyl, Promo	VCRTXDJ 095
United Kingdom	September 17, 2001	Nebula	CDr, Single, Promo	none
United Kingdom	September 17, 2001	Nebula	12", vinyl, Promo, Single Sided	NEBDJ020
United Kingdom	2004	Nebula Classics	12", vinyl	NEB020
United Kingdom	2004	Nebula Classics	12", vinyl	NEBDJ020
United Kingdom	September 17, 2001	Virgin	CD, Maxi	7243 8 97955 2 3
France	2003	Independence Records	12", vinyl	IR 0302
France	January, 2005	Independence Records	12", vinyl, Picture Disc	IR 0434 V
France	January, 2005	Universal Licensing Music (ULM)	12", vinyl, Picture Disc	982 695-8
