= Manufactured Superstars =

US electronic dance music duo

- Origin: Denver, Colorado
- Genres: Electronic, house, progressive
- Years active: 2005–present
- Label: Black Hole Recordings
- Members: Brad Roulier; Shawn Sabo

The Manufactured Superstars are an electronic dance music DJ/production duo from Denver, Colorado consisting of Bradley Roulier and Shawn Sabo.

== Biography ==
=== DJ ===
As DJs, their performance style is high-energy, accessible and technically challenging. Their trademark stage costumes are matching NASA spacesuits and often share the stage with a six-foot-tall teddy bear. Sabo and Roulier have stated that their core philosophy is, "We just wanna play great tunes and be the funnest DJs out there!"

Their DJ performances have been described as "mash-up" or "open-format" by many in the music press. It is not unusual for the pair to play in excess of 100 tunes in the span of a two-hour DJ set, and those sets often traverse from mainstream pop to underground prog-house to urban-infused electro and beyond. The duo are expanding their radio mixshows and podcasts, and their club mixes can be heard on terrestrial, satellite and webradio stations worldwide.

Manufactured Superstars have played on the mainstage at outdoor festivals including Identity Festival, Nocturnal Wonderland, Ultra Music Festival, Electric Daisy Carnival, the Beatport Pool Party during Miami Music Week, Red Rocks/Global Dance Festival and Lief Festival. They also have club residencies at XS night club inside The Encore in Las Vegas and Beta Nightclub in Denver, the latter of which Roulier is the owner. Other clubs they have also played at include LAVO, Pacha and Greenhouse in New York; Fluxx and Voyeur in San Diego; Playhouse in Los Angeles; Arkadia and LIV in Miami.

=== History ===
==== 2006 ====
Formed in 2006, the Manufactured Superstars started on the American club scene of the late 1990s. Both are experienced producers; Roulier was also a leading club promoter in Colorado, and SABO traveled the U.S. as a drum-and-bass DJ and had had 20 commercial vinyl drum-and-bass releases. Roulier is a co-founder and founding member of leading digital music retailer, Beatport. Sabo was an original employee of Beatport and he remains a member today.

==== 2009 ====
In 2009, The Manufactured Superstars played at The Kennedy Center in Washington DC and in 2011 at a private event celebrating the inaugural launch of the Virgin Galactic space port.

The duo's music and avatars have featured in the social-networking, geo-based-location video game, BOOYAH's 'Nightclub City: DJ Rivals'.

The Manufactured Superstars’ recording deal with Black Hole Recordings has seen releases such as: "Angry Circus" and "Drummer Drums"; "Take Me Over" featuring Scarlett Quinn (video directed by Christopher Andrews); "Serious" featuring Selina Albright; and "Drunk Text" featuring Lea Luna. "Take Me Over" received immense support on radio and TV, including charting "top 3" on SiriusXM Radio for the audio single and BPM-TV (Canada) for the music video. In 2011, an E.P. titled Freak On You (Black Hole) was released. That same year, they founded their own label—Manufactured Music.

==== 2012 ====
2012 saw the release of the following Manufactured Superstars’ singles: with Jeziel Quintela featuring Christian Burns, "Silver Splits The Blue"; a collaboration with L.A. Riots featuring Selina Albright, "Born To Rock"; a collaboration with Luciana titled "Calling All The Lovers". 2012 also saw the beginning of The Manufactured Superstars’ music being aired on iHeartRadio.com's "Evolution" radio show, which is broadcast on select Clear Channel terrestrial radio stations including 101.7FM in Boston.

In 2013 the Manufactured Superstars vs JQA Remix of Tiestio ft BT's "Love Comes Again" for Magik Muzik was released.

== Discography ==
=== Singles ===
- "Like Satellites" (featuring Danni Rouge)
- "Take Me Over" (featuring Scarlett Quinn)
- "Zombies In Love"
- "Stay" (featuring Jarvis Church)
- "Magnetic"
- "Silver Splits The Blue" (with Jeziel Quintela featuring Christian Burns)
- "Serious" (featuring Selina Albright)
- "Swagger Right" (featuring Vassy)
- "Voyager" (featuring Fingazz)

=== Remixes ===
- Calvin Harris featuring Ayah Marar – "Thinking About You (Manufactured Superstars Remix)"
- Robbie Rivera – "Starlight (Manufactured Superstars Remix)" [Black Hole Recordings]
- Alex Gaudino featuring Nicole Scherzinger – "Missing You (Manufactured Superstars Remix)"
- Katy Perry – "Unconditionally (Manufactured Superstars Remix)"
- ATB and Melissa Loretta – "If it's love (Jeziel Quintela Jquintel & Manufactured Superstars Remix)"
- Tiësto featuring BT – "Love Comes Again (Manufactured Superstars vs. JQA Remix)"
