= Flight 643 =

- Flight 643 single cover

Single by DJ Tiësto

from the album In My Memory
- Released: April 30, 2001
- Recorded: 2001
- Genre: Tech trance
- Length: 9:05
- Label: Magik Muzik; Black Hole
- Songwriter(s): Tijs Verwest
- Producer(s): DJ Tiësto

DJ Tiësto singles chronology
"Suburban Train" / "Urban Train" (2001)	"Flight 643" (2001)	"643 (Love's on Fire)" (2002)

"Flight 643" is a single which appeared in DJ Tiësto's first album, In My Memory. In 2001 it was included as a B-side of "Urban Train", later released as an A-Side single; In 2006 it became B-side of "Lethal Industry" as a remix by Richard Durand. The song had great success that it was adapted with vocals by Suzanne Palmer in 2002, it was also released as a single and titled "643 (Love's on Fire)". The name Flight 643 is derived from KLM Royal Dutch Airlines flight number KL643, which is a non-stop service between Amsterdam and New York JFK. The big room house DJ John Christian made a rework of the track in October 2013 and got his version released on Tiësto's label, Musical Freedom. It's featured in the soundtrack for the 2001 videogame FIFA Football 2002 In April 2023 Dutch duo Hel:sløwed, a joint venture of Misja Helsloot and Michael de Kooker, released a remake of the track on Tiësto's Deep House imprint, AFTR:HRS.

== Formats and track listings ==
=== CD, Maxi Singles ===
Netherlands, Scandinavia Maxi Single

1. "Flight 643" (Radio Edit)–2:53
2. "Flight 643" (Original Mix)–9:05
3. "Flight 643" (Jaimy & Kenny D Remix) - 7:38
4. "Flight 643" (Oliver Klein Remix) - 9:27
5. "Flight 643" (Orkidea's Wintergalactic Mix) - 9:11

Netherlands Maxi Single

1. "Flight 643" (Original Mix)–9:05
2. "Flight 643" (Jaimy & Kenny D Remix) - 7:43
3. "Flight 643" (Oliver Klein Remix) - 9:29
4. "Flight 643" (Orkidea's Wintergalactic Mix) - 9:27

United Kingdom Maxi Single

1. "Flight 643" (Original Mix)–6:29
2. "Flight 643" (Oliver Klein Remix) - 6:42
3. "Flight 643" (Jaimy & Kenny D Remix) - 6:37

=== 12" Vinyl ===
Magik Muzik 12" Vinyl

1. "Flight 643" (Radio Edit)–2:53
2. "Flight 643" –9:05

Nebula 12" Vinyl

1. "Flight 643" (Jaimy & Kenny D Remix) - 7:38
2. "Flight 643" (Orkidea's Wintergalactic Mix) - 9:11

Nebula, Nettwerk America, Independence Records, Universal Licensing Music (ULM) 12" Vinyl

1. "Flight 643" (Original Mix)–9:07
2. "Flight 643" (Oliver Klein Remix) - 9:27

Nettwerk America 12" Vinyl

1. "Flight 643" (Original Mix)–9:07
2. "Flight 643" (Orkidea's Wintergalactic Mix) - 9:12

Nettwerk America 12" Vinyl

1. "Flight 643" (Original Mix)–9:07
2. "Flight 643" (Orkidea's Wintergalactic Mix) - 9:12
3. "Flight 643" (Oliver Klein Remix) - 9:27
4. "Flight 643" (Jaimy & Kenny D Remix) - 7:50

Richard Durand Remixes

1. "Lethal Industry" (Richard Durand Remix) - 8:48
2. "Flight 643" (Richard Durand Remix) - 9:17

=== Urban Train/Flight 643 ===
Dos Or Die Recordings 12" Vinyl

1. "Suburban Train" (Original Mix) - 9:20
2. "Flight 643" (Original Mix) - 9:04

Dos Or Die Recordings 12" Vinyl

1. "Suburban Train" (Marc O'Tool Main Remix)
2. "Flight 643" (Oliver Klein Remix) - 9:27

Dos Or Die Recordings 12" Vinyl

1. "Urban Train" (Radio Edit) - 3:24
2. "Flight 643" (Radio Edit) - 2:52
3. "Urban Train" (Original Mix) - 8:25
4. "Flight 643" (Original Mix) - 6:18

== Charts ==
=== Weekly charts ===
Chart (2001–02)	Peak position
Netherlands (Dutch Top 40)	8
Netherlands (Single Top 100)	7
UK Singles (OCC)	56
US Dance Club Songs (Billboard)	48

=== Year-end charts ===
Chart (2001)	Position
Netherlands (Dutch Top 40)	86
Netherlands (Single Top 100)	68

== Official versions ==
- Radio Edit (2:52)
- Original Mix (9:05)
- Oliver Klein Remix (9:27)
- Jaimy & Kenny D Remix (7:38)
- Orkidea's Wintergalactic Mix (9:11)
- Richard Durand Remix (8:48)
- John Christian Original Mix (5:55)
- Laidback Luke 2010 Rework (6:00)
- Fei-Fei's Feded Trap 643 (3:56)
- Hel:sløwed - Flight 643 (5:27)
- KAAZE Remix (3:37)

United Kingdom tracks were edited for their release.

- Original Mix (6:29)
- Oliver Klein Remix (6:42)
- Jaimy & Kenny D Remix (6:37)

== Release history ==
Region	Date	Label	Format	Catalog
Sweden	2002	Playground Music Scandinavia	CD-ROM	None
Scandinavia	2001	Playground Music Scandinavia	CD, Maxi	MAGIK MUZIK 801-2
Netherlands	June 22, 2001	Magik Muzik	CD, Single	Magik Muzik 801-1
Netherlands	2001	Magik Muzik	vinyl, 12", Promo	BHMM 801-5P
Netherlands	June 22, 2001	Magik Muzik	CD, Maxi	Magik Muzik 801-2
Netherlands	2001	Magik Muzik	2 x vinyl, 12"	Magik Muzik 801-5
Netherlands	December 11, 2006	Magik Muzik	vinyl, 12", Limited Edition, Picture Disc	Magik Muzik 835-6
United States	2001	Nettwerk	2 x vinyl, 12", Promo	0 6700 33122 1 9
United States	2001	Nettwerk	vinyl, 12"	0 6700 33123 1 8
United Kingdom	2001	Nebula	vinyl, 12", Promo	NEBDJX016
United Kingdom	2001	Nebula	vinyl, 12", Promo	NEBDJ016
United Kingdom	April 30, 2001	Nebula	CD, Maxi	NEBCD016
United Kingdom	April 30, 2001	Nebula	vinyl, 12"	NEBTX016
United Kingdom	April 30, 2001	Nebula	vinyl, 12"	NEBT016
United Kingdom	2004	Nebula Classics	vinyl, 12"	NEB016
France	January, 2005	Independence Records	vinyl, 12", Picture Disc	IR 0435 V
France	January, 2005	Universal Licensing Music (ULM)	vinyl, 12", Picture Disc	982 696-0
Germany	January 21, 2002	Jive	CD, Maxi	RTD 103.3865.3
Germany	2002	Dos Or Die Recordings	vinyl, 12"	DOS 185
Germany	2002	Dos Or Die Recordings	vinyl, 12"	DOS 195
Germany	December 2006	Kontor Records	vinyl, 12", Limited Edition, Picture Disc	K579
