= In My Memory (song) =

- In My Memory single cover

Single by DJ Tiësto featuring Nicola Hitchcock

from the album In My Memory
- Released: 23 April 2002
- Genre: Vocal trance
- Length: 6:08
- Label: Magik Muzik; Black Hole
- Songwriters: Tijs Verwest; Nicola Hitchcock
- Producer: DJ Tiësto

DJ Tiësto singles chronology
"Obsession" (2002)	"In My Memory" (2002)	"Traffic" (2003)

Nicola Hitchcock singles chronology
"Not Seventeen" (2000)	"In My Memory" (2002)	"Can You Find the Heart" (2003)

"In My Memory" is a song by Dutch producer DJ Tiësto. It was released in April 2002 as a single from his debut album, In My Memory. The song includes vocals by Nicola Hitchcock of the band Mandalay. The song did not chart in Europe, but being the title track for the album it gained great success in North America.

"In My Memory" was remixed by various artists including Gabriel & Dresden; and Laurent Veronez, under his aliases of Airwave and V-One. Other artists such as Fade and Quadra also remixed it and were included in the various releases.

== Track listings ==
Magik Muzik 12" vinyl

1. "In My Memory" (V-One remix) - 8:07
2. "In My Memory" (Airwave remix) - 8:45
3. "In My Memory" (Gabriel & Dresden Elephant Memory vocal) - 9:12
4. "In My Memory" (Fade's Sanctuary remix) - 8:48

Electropolis 12" vinyl

1. "In My Memory" (Gabriel & Dresden Elephant Memory vocal) - 9:09
2. "In My Memory" (V-One remix) - 8:07
3. "In My Memory" (Airwave remix) - 8:45
4. "In My Memory" (Airwave instrumental) - 8:03

Zomba Records 12" vinyl

1. "In My Memory" (Airwave remix) - 8:45
2. "In My Memory" (original album version) - 6:06
3. "In My Memory" (Quadra's Bombworkxs dub mix) - 9:18
4. "In My Memory" (Fade's Sanctuary mix) - 8:48

Nebula Classics 12" vinyl

1. "In My Memory" (Fade's Drifted remix) - 8:27
2. "In My Memory" (Gabriel & Dresden Elephant Memory vocal remix) - 8:54

Nebula Classics 12" vinyl

1. "In My Memory" (Airwave instrumental remix) - 8:04
2. "In My Memory" (V-One remix) - 8:08
3. "In My Memory" (radio edit) - 3:59

== Personnel ==
- Vocals: Nicola Hitchcock
- Writer(s), composer(s): DJ Tiësto & Nicola Hitchcock

== Charts ==
=== Weekly charts ===
Weekly chart performance for "In My Memory" by Tiesto
Chart (2002)	Peak position
Canada (Nielsen SoundScan)	15
US Hot Singles Sales (Billboard)	63
US Hot Dance Music/Maxi-Singles Sales (Billboard)	13
US Dance Club Songs (Billboard)	12

=== Year-end charts ===
Year-end chart performance for "In My Memory" by Tiesto
Chart (2002)	Position
Canada (Nielsen SoundScan)	134

== Official versions ==
- Original Album Version (6:06)
- Quadra's Bombworkxs Dub Mix (9:18)
- Fade's Sanctuary Mix (8:48)
- Fade's Drifted Remix (8:27)
- Gabriel & Dresden Elephant Memory Vocal Remix (9:09)
- V-One Remix (8:07)
- Airwave Remix (8:45)
- Airwave Instrumental (8:03)
- Maor Levi Remix (5:13)

== Release history ==
Region	Date	Label	Format	Catalog
Spain	2003	Electropolis	vinyl, 12"	VLMX 1341-3
Germany	2003	Zomba Records	vinyl, 12"	RTD 103.4126.0
United Kingdom	2002	Nebula Classics	vinyl, 12"	NEBBC002
United Kingdom	2004	Nebula Classics	vinyl, 12"	NEBBC003
Netherlands	2002	Magik Muzik	2 x Vinyl, 12"	Magik Muzik 805-5
