= Tiësto in Concert 2 =

Video by Tiësto
- Released: (Netherlands) November 26, 2004 (United States) 2005
- Recorded: October 29 & 30, 2004.
- Venue: GelreDome, Arnhem, Netherlands
- Genre: Trance
- Length: 184 minutes (3 hour and 4 Minutes)
- Label: Black Hole Recordings
- Director: Guus Albregt, Jeroen Jansen
- Producer: Arny Bink, Marjolijn Franken, Bas van Oers

Tiësto in Concert 2 is a DVD of Tiësto's performance on October 29/30, 2004 in Arnhem's GelreDome.

The theme of the 2004 show is "Magik", a word which has become somewhat a trademark for the 3-time-in-a-row winner of DJ Mag's Top 100 list. All sorts of "Magik" were incorporated into the shows, complementing Tiësto's sounds with visual entertainment. Also several guest performers showcased their talents by performing with and alongside Tiësto during the night, such as Matt Hales from Aqualung and violin player DJ Mason, Micha Klein, the Bulgarian Children of Orpheus choir and loads of fireworks.

== Video listing ==
Disc 1
No.	Title	Length
1.	"Tiësto - Forever Today"	11:42
2.	"Tiësto - Olympic Flame"	4:01
3.	"Fred Baker vs. Nyram - Confirmation"	6:51
4.	"Fred Baker - Total Blackout"	4:44
5.	"Tiësto - Breda 8 p.m. (DJ Montana Edit)"	4:31
6.	"Thomas Datt - 2V2 (Robert Nickson Mix)"	5:33
7.	"DJ Ernesto - Stop 9.5 (Phynn Salvation Mix)"	6:14
8.	"Primer - Everlast"	6:32
9.	"Ridgewalkers - Find (Andy Moor Mix)"	5:11
10.	"Tiësto - Euphoria (Featuring [Guest Performer] Violin – DJ Mason)"	6:23
11.	"Whirlpool & Octagen - Alaska"	4:16
12.	"Electrovoya - Effervesce / Tiësto - Athena"	12:42
13.	"Tiësto - UR (Live Performance of Matt Hales)"	6:24
14.	"Allure - Eastern Magik"	3:53
15.	"Phynn - Lucid"	4:06
16.	"Rob Rolefes - Mel Percuetek"	4:20
17.	"Tiësto feat. BT - Love Comes Again"	6:14
18.	"Danjo & Styles - Duende (Signum Remix)"	5:13
19.	"Rank 1 - Beatz At Rank-1 Dotcom"	3:00
20.	"Children Of Orpheus - Open Your Heart"	2:20
21.	"Tiësto - Suburban Train (Live Performance of Children Of Orpheus)"	6:54
22.	"Tiësto - Just Be (Antillas Club Mix)"	7:00
23.	"Tiësto - Adagio For Strings"	8:14
24.	"Tiësto - Lethal Industry (Copenhagen Version) (Live Performance of Mason)"	7:32
25.	"Tiësto - Magikal Circus"	9:09
26.	"Tiësto - Goldrush (DJ Montana Remix)"	2:22
27.	"Tiësto - Traffic (DJ Montana 12" Edit)"	5:11
28.	"Kay D. Smith & Marc Tall Pres Passive Resistance - Praiseworthy Tunes (Hoipolloi Mix)"	3:48
29.	"Jesselyn - Omnia (Tech-Trance Mix)"	2:34
30.	"Dark Alliance - Vibration"	5:34
31.	"Delerium - Silence (DJ Tiësto's In Search Of Sunrise Remix)"	10:54

Bonus Disc
No.	Title	Length
1.	"Photon Project - Illusions"
2.	"Allure - Spastik"
3.	"Aqualung - Easier To Lie"
4.	"Tiësto - Heroes"

== Certifications ==
Region	Certification	Certified units/sales
Canada (Music Canada)	Gold	5,000^{^}
Netherlands (NVPI)	Gold	40,000^{^}
^{^} Shipments figures based on certification alone.
