= Lethal Industry =

- Lethal Industry single cover

Single by DJ Tiësto

from the album In My Memory
- A-side: "Lethal Industry"
- B-side: "Suburban Train" (2001); "Flight 643" (2006)
- Released: 1999
- Recorded: 1999
- Genre: Tech trance
- Length: 6:45 (original mix); 5:51 (3Bird remix)
- Label: Magik Muzik; Black Hole
- Songwriter: Tijs Verwest
- Producer: DJ Tiësto

DJ Tiësto singles chronology
"Sparkles" (1999)	"Lethal Industry" (1999)	"Suburban Train" / "Urban Train" (2001)

Richard Durand Remixes
- Cover by Arny Bink and Lisa Candela

"Lethal Industry" is a single which appears on Dutch DJ Tiësto's debut studio album, In My Memory (2001). Before the album was created he released several singles to see what the popularity and the reaction of his audience would be towards these tracks. He first released "Lethal Industry" in 1999, only three copies were made, the track was cut by 777 Mastering and released in an Acetate 12" vinyl by VC Recordings in UK.

It was officially first released in 2001 and with his next song "Suburban Train" as a B-side only available in Netherlands. In 2002 a "Lethal Live Mix" was released, it was a combination of the Fred Numf vs. Etienne Overdijk remix, Mauro Picotto remix, and Svenson & Gielen remix. The Radio Edit of Lethal Industry was edited by Cor Fijneman, he is not credited in the edit since it is the same as the original track in its radio version, the Live Edit was recorded by Dutch Dimension at Tiësto Solo Amsterdam on 2 February 2002.

Tiësto has played "Lethal Industry" along Mason in live performances of the Tiësto in Concert 2, he became the first DJ to include a violin, and a classical instrument along a turntable. It was also included in his third studio album, Parade of the Athletes which was created due to Tiësto's success in the 2004 Summer Olympic Games. Tiësto mixed Lethal Industry with Marco V's tracks "Godd", and created "Lethal Godd", which has become very popular due to the lyrics it contains. In 2006, DJ Richard Durand remixed two songs from Tiësto, "Lethal Industry" and the trance anthem "Flight 643", Tiësto included Richard Durand's remix of "Flight 643" in his Copenhagen: Elements of Life World Tour. The music video is taken from Tiësto in Concert 2, the version includes Mason and became a great success, bringing the song higher in the chart positions.

The tune used in "Lethal Industry" was created by Alec Empire in 1992: Alec Empire – SuEcide, Alec Empire – Sueside (Junkie Remix 1995).

== Formats and track listings ==
=== CD, maxi singles ===
Netherlands maxi-single

1. "Lethal Industry" (Live Edit) – 2:53
2. "Lethal Industry" (Radio Edit) – 2:45
3. "Lethal Industry" (Original) – 6:47
4. "Lethal Industry" (Mauro Picotto Remix) – 7:48
5. "Lethal Industry" (Svenson & Gielen Remix) – 7:05
6. "Lethal Industry" (Fred Numf vs. Etienne Overdijk Remix) – 7:38

Germany maxi-single

1. "Lethal Industry" (Radio Edit) – 2:43
2. "Lethal Industry" (Original Mix) – 6:46
3. "Lethal Industry" (Svenson & Gielen Remix) – 7:03
4. "Lethal Industry" (Sphaera Remix) – 8:39
5. "Lethal Industry" (CJ Stone Meets Mr. Phillips Remix) – 6:46
6. "Lethal Industry" (Mauro Picotto Remix) – 7:47

United Kingdom maxi-single

1. "Lethal Industry" (Lethal Edit) – 2:05
2. "Lethal Industry" (Lethal Live Mix) – 17:50

=== 12" vinyl ===
Magik Muzik 12" vinyl

1. "Lethal Industry" (Live Edit) – 2:53
2. "Lethal Industry" (Radio Edit) – 2:45

VC Recordings 12" vinyl

1. "Lethal Industry" (Original Mix) – 6:45
2. "Lethal Industry" (Mauro Picotto Remix) – 7:50

VC Recordings 12" vinyl

1. "Lethal Industry" (Original Mix) – 6:45
2. "Lethal Industry" (Svenson & Gielen Remix) – 7:05

VC Recordings 12" vinyl

1. "Lethal Industry" (Svenson & Gielen Mix) – 7:05
2. "Lethal Industry" (Fred Numf vs. Etienne Overdijk Remix) – 7:38

VC Recordings promo CD

1. "Lethal Industry" (Lethal Edit) – 2:05

Dos Or Die Recordings 12" vinyl

1. "Lethal Industry" (Original Mix) – 6:45
2. "Lethal Industry" (Svenson & Gielen Remix) – 7:03
3. "Lethal Industry" (Mauro Picotto Remix) – 7:50

Dos Or Die Recordings 12" vinyl

1. "Lethal Industry" (Sphaera Remix) – 8:39
2. "Lethal Industry" (CJ Stone Meets Mr. Phillips Remix) – 6:46

Electropolis 12" 2 x vinyl

1. "Lethal Industry" (Original Mix) – 6:47
2. "Lethal Industry" (Mauro Picotto Remix) – 7:48
3. "Lethal Industry" (Svenson & Gielen Remix) – 7:05
4. "Lethal Industry" (Fred Numf vs. Etienne Overdijk Remix) – 7:38

Electropolis 12" vinyl

1. "Lethal Industry" (DJ Richard & John Bass Remix) – 6:39
2. "Lethal Industry" (CJ Stone Meets Mr. Phillips Remix) – 6:46
3. "Lethal Industry" (Original Mix) – 6:45

Richard Durand Remixes

1. "Lethal Industry" (Richard Durand Remix) – 8:48
2. "Flight 643" (Richard Durand Remix) – 9:17

Nebula Classics 12" vinyl

1. "Lethal Industry" (Original Mix) – 6:45
2. "Lethal Industry" (Svenson & Gielen Remix) – 7:05

Independence Records, Universal Licensing Music (ULM) 12" vinyl

1. "Lethal Industry" (Original Mix) – 6:45
2. "Lethal Industry" (Svenson & Gielen Remix) – 7:05

Sublogic Corporation 12" vinyl

1. "Lethal Industry" (a98 Remix) – 7:50

Jorn van Deynhoven Remix

1. "Lethal Industry" (Jorn van Deynhoven Remix) – 5:32

=== Remixes ===
Sebastien Bruce Remix-single

1. "Lethal Industry" (Sebastien Bruce Remix) – 5:58

Sterbinszky & Coddie Remix-single

1. "Lethal Industry" (Sterbinszky & Coddie Remix-Part 1) – 6:55
2. "Lethal Industry" (Sterbinszky & Coddie Remix-Part 2) – 7:03

Hardwell Remix-digital download

1. "Lethal Industry" (Hardwell Remix) – 4:29

Scot Project Remix-unreleased

1. "Lethal Industry" (Scot Project Remix) – 7:55

== Charts ==
=== Weekly charts ===
Chart (2002–2006)	Peak position
Belgium (Ultratop 50 Flanders)	15
Germany (GfK)	95
Hungary (Single Top 40)	6
Netherlands (Dutch Top 40)	7
Netherlands (Single Top 100)	6
Spain (Promusicae)	5
UK Singles (Official Charts)	25
US Billboard Global Dance Tracks	38

=== Year-end charts ===
Chart (2002)	Position
Belgium (Ultratop Flanders)	85
Netherlands (Dutch Top 40)	50
Netherlands (Single Top 100)	57

== Official versions ==
- a98 Remix (7:50)
- Album Version (6:46)
- Fred Numf vs. Etienne Overdijk Remix (7:40)
- Lethal Edit (2:05)
- Lethal Live Mix (17:50)
- Live Edit (2:53)
- Live performance by Mason (7:32)
- Mauro Picotto Remix (7:50)
- Original Mix (6:45)
- Radio Edit (2:45)
- DJ Richard & John Bass Remix (6:39)
- Richard Durand Remix (8:48)
- Sphaera Remix (8:39)
- CJ Stone Meets Mr. Phillips Remix (6:46)
- Svenson & Gielen Remix (7:05)
- Sunnery James & Ryan Marciano Original (7:08)
- Sunnery James & Ryan Marciano Original – TV Noise Remix (4:32)
- Sterbinszky & Coddie Remix – Part 1 (6:55)
- Sterbinszky & Coddie Remix – Part 2 (7:03)
- Sebastien Bruce Remix (5:58)
- Hardwell Remix (4:29)
- GTA 2013 Rerub (5:37)
- Jorn van Deynhoven Remix (5:32)
- KEVU Festival Remix (4:22)

== Release history ==
Region	Date	Label	Format	Catalog
Netherlands	2001	Magik Muzik	Vinyl; 12"	BHMM 804-4
Netherlands	29 March 2002	Magik Muzik	CD; maxi	Magik Muzik 804-2
Netherlands	13 March 2002	Magik Muzik	CD; single	Magik Muzik 804-1
Netherlands	2002	Magik Muzik	2 x vinyl; 12"	Magik Muzik 804-5
Netherlands	2 April 2002	Sublogic Corporation	File; MP3	SCA0079
Netherlands	11 December 2006	Magik Muzik	Vinyl; 12"; picture disc; limited edition	Magik Muzik 835-6
Germany	11 December 2006	Kontor	Vinyl; 12"; picture disc; limited edition	Kontor579
Germany	22 July 2002	Jive	CD; maxi	RTD 103.4037.3
Germany	29 May 2002	Dos Or Die	Vinyl; 12"	DOS 214
Germany	29 May 2002	Dos Or Die	Vinyl; 12"	DOS 219
France	January 2005	Independence	Vinyl; 12"; picture disc	IR 0436 V
France	January 2005	Universal Licensing Music (ULM)	Vinyl; 12"; picture disc	982 695-9
United Kingdom	1999	VC	Acetate; 12"; single sided; limited edition	None, first release limited to 3 copies
United Kingdom	1 April 2002	VC	CD; maxi	VCRD 103
United Kingdom	1 April 2002	VC	Vinyl; 12"	VCRD 103
United Kingdom	25 March 2002	VC	Vinyl; 12"	VCRTDJ 103
United Kingdom	2001	VC	CD; single; promo	VCRDDJ 103
United Kingdom	2004	Nebula Classics	Vinyl; 12"	NEB024
Spain	2002	Electropolis	Vinyl; 12"	VLMX 1087-3
Spain	2003	Electropolis	Vinyl; 12"	VLMX 1278-3
