= Tiësto =

Dutch DJ and record producer (born 1969)

Tiësto OON
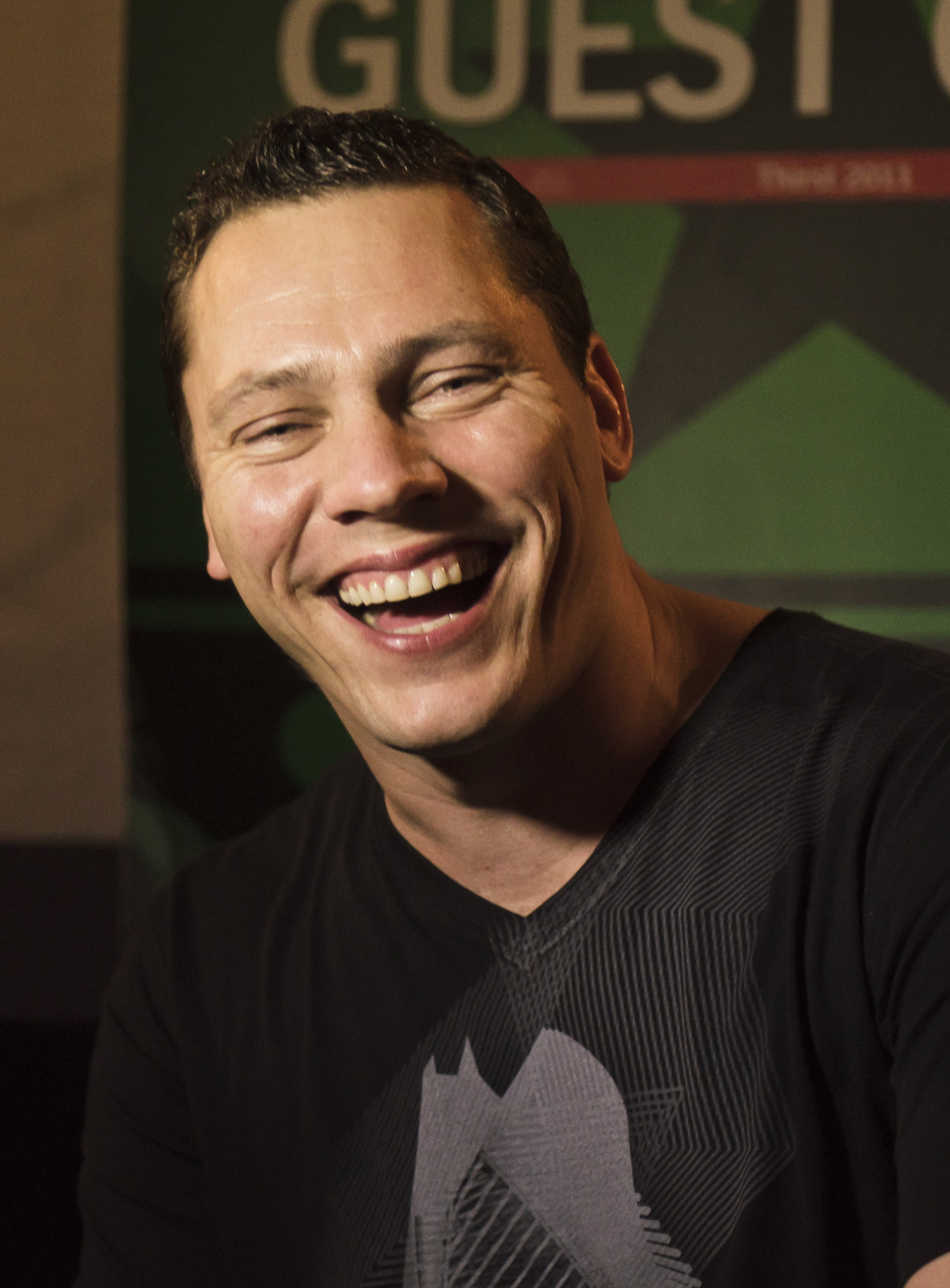
- Tiësto in 2011

Background information
- Also known as: Stray Dog; Steve Forte Rio; Allure; VER:WEST; TST; Glycerine
- Born: Tijs Michiel Verwest; 17 January 1969 (age 57); Breda, North Brabant, Netherlands
- Genres: EDM; trance; house; techno
- Occupations: Disc jockey; record producer
- Years active: 1994–present
- Labels: Musical Freedom; AFTR:HRS; Spinnin'; PM:AM; Universal; PIAS; Ultra; Bonzai Jumps; Black Hole; Nettwerk; Atlantic
- Formerly of: Gouryella
- Spouse: Annika Backes (m. 2019)
- Website: tiesto.com

Tijs Michiel Verwest OON (Dutch pronunciation: [ˈtɛis miˈxil vərˈʋɛst]; born 17 January 1969), known professionally as Tiësto (/tiːˈɛstoʊ/ tee-EST-oh, Dutch: [ˈtɕɛstoː]), is a Dutch DJ and record producer. He was voted "The Greatest DJ of All Time" by Mix magazine in a 2010/2011 poll amongst fans. In 2013, he was voted by DJ Mag readers as the "best DJ of the last 20 years". He is also regarded as the "Godfather of EDM" by many sources.

In 1997, Tiësto founded the label Black Hole Recordings with Arny Bink, where he released the Magik and In Search of Sunrise CD series. Tiësto met producer Dennis Waakop Reijers in 1998; the two have worked together extensively since then.

From 1998 to 2000, Tiësto collaborated with Ferry Corsten under the name Gouryella. His 2000 remix of Delerium's "Silence" featuring Sarah McLachlan exposed him to more mainstream audiences. In 2001, he released his first solo album, In My Memory, which gave him several major hits that launched his career. He was voted World No.1 DJ by DJ Magazine in its annual Top 100 DJs poll consecutively for three years from 2002 to 2004.

Just after releasing his second studio album, Just Be, he performed live at the 2004 Summer Olympics opening ceremony in Athens, the first DJ to play live on stage at an Olympics. In April 2007, Tiësto launched his radio show Tiësto's Club Life on Radio 538 in the Netherlands and released his third studio album, Elements of Life. The album reached number one on the Belgian album chart as well on Billboard Top Electronic Albums in the U.S. and received a nomination for a Grammy Award in 2008. Tiësto released his fourth studio album Kaleidoscope in October 2009, followed by A Town Called Paradise in June 2014. He won the Grammy Award for Best Remixed Recording, Non-Classical for his remixed version of John Legend's hit "All of Me" at the 57th Annual Grammy Awards.

== Early life ==
Tijs Michiel Verwest was born in Breda, North Brabant, on 17 January 1969. He discovered his passion for music at the age of 12. He used to listen to radioshows like the Ferry Maat Soulshow and In The Mix from Ben Liebrand. At age fourteen, he intensified his commitment to the art, and began DJing professionally at school parties. Between 1985 and 1994, Tiësto began a residency at several clubs in the Netherlands at the behest of his manager. At the Spock, a small club in Breda, he fine-tuned his own live style by performing from 10 p.m. until 4 a.m. on weekends. In the beginning of his career as a DJ, he mostly played new beat and acid house.

== Career ==
=== 1994–2000: Early projects and success ===
In 1994, he began releasing material on Noculan Records' sub-labels Chemo and Coolman. During these years, he produced hardcore and gabber tracks under such aliases as Da Joker and DJ Limited. Tiësto was later discovered by the general manager of Rotterdam-based Basic Beat Recordings.

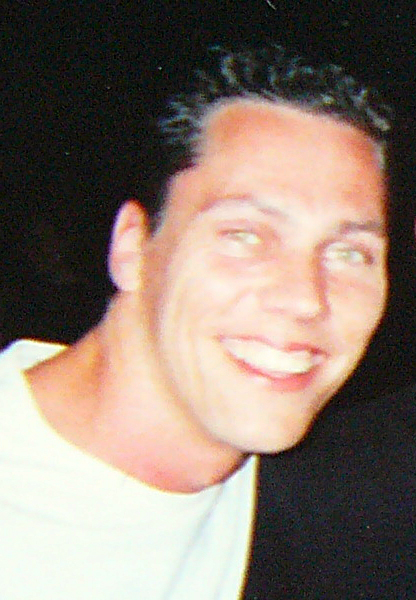
Tiësto in Sant Antoni, Ibiza, prior to performing at Amnesia, July 2000

In late 1994, Tiësto signed to Basic Beat where he met Arny Bink, Tiësto released records on the sub-label Trashcan, founded by Arny, and later created the Guardian Angel sub-label with Arny in which they introduced the popular Forbidden Paradise series. From 1995 to 1996 he released four extended plays on Bonzai Jumps and XTC, sub-labels of Lightning Records. In 1997, he joined his friend Yves Vandichel on his sub-label, DJ Yves, a division of the now defunct Human Resource label XSV Music. In the fall of 1997, Bink and Tiësto decided to leave Basic Beat and create their own parent label, Black Hole Recordings, Trashcan was discontinued and Guardian Angel continued releasing music until 2002. Through Black Hole, Tiësto released the Magik series and also created two major sub-labels; SongBird and In Trance We Trust. From 1998 to 1999, he released music on Planetary Consciousness where he met A&R Hardy Heller and invited him to release some records on Black Hole.

In 1998, Tiësto joined forces with fellow Dutch deejay Ferry Corsten to create the trance-based duo of Gouryella. The first Gouryella track, also called "Gouryella", was released in May 1999 and became a huge hit, scoring various chart positions around the world, including a top-15 position in the UK Singles Chart. Tiësto showcased this track in Magik Three: Far from Earth as well as in his set at the first ID&T Innercity party (Live at Innercity: Amsterdam RAI), his first major breakthrough. The next single, entitled "Walhalla", also made it on the charts worldwide, peaking at No. 27 in the UK Singles Chart. Released via Ferry's Tsunami label, both singles went on to be certified Gold on record sales. During these years, Tiësto also collaborated with Benno de Goeij of Rank 1 under the name Kamaya Painters. In November 1999, he released the first installment of the In Search of Sunrise series. Since then, he performed monthly as a resident at Gatecrasher in Sheffield, and played a 12-hour set, his longest, in Amsterdam. On 31 December 1999, he performed at Trance Energy 2000, a special party held by ID&T for the turn of the millennium.

Together with Armin van Buuren, Tiësto created two projects in 2000; Alibi – "Eternity", which was released on Armind, and Major League – "Wonder Where You Are?", on Black Hole. After the release of "Tenshi" in September 2000, Tiësto decided to concentrate on his solo work and left Ferry Corsten to take on the Gouryella project solely as his own. Through his first compilations and the "In Trance We Trust" series, he ended up introducing Armin van Buuren and Johan Gielen to the mainstream. Summerbreeze marked Tiësto's U.S. debut, a mix album that showcased his remix of Delerium's "Silence", which spent four weeks in the UK's Top Ten chart and reached number three in the Billboard dance chart. In Search of Sunrise 2 was released in November 2000.

=== 2001–2003: In My Memory ===
External videos
- Tiësto – Urban Train ft. Kirsty Hawkshaw (Official Music Video)

In 2001, Tiësto created a new sub-label, Magik Muzik, and released his first solo album, In My Memory, which contained 5 major hits; "Lethal Industry", which was actually produced in 1999 and had only 3 copies released at that time, the track was officially released in 2001 which was remixed by Richard Durand in 2006 along with "Flight 643" which was another leading single that was later adapted with vocals by Suzanne Palmer and released as "643 (Love's on Fire)". Other tracks were "Obsession" in which Tiësto worked alongside Junkie XL, the instrumental tracks "Dallas 4PM" and "Suburban Train" with "Urban Train" as its vocal version. The last singles to be released were "In My Memory" which is the title track for the album as it only received high ratings in the United States and the opening track "Magik Journey" which opened Tiësto in Concert (2003). On 2 February 2002, Tiësto played nine consecutive hours during the second edition of the Dutch Dimension festival.

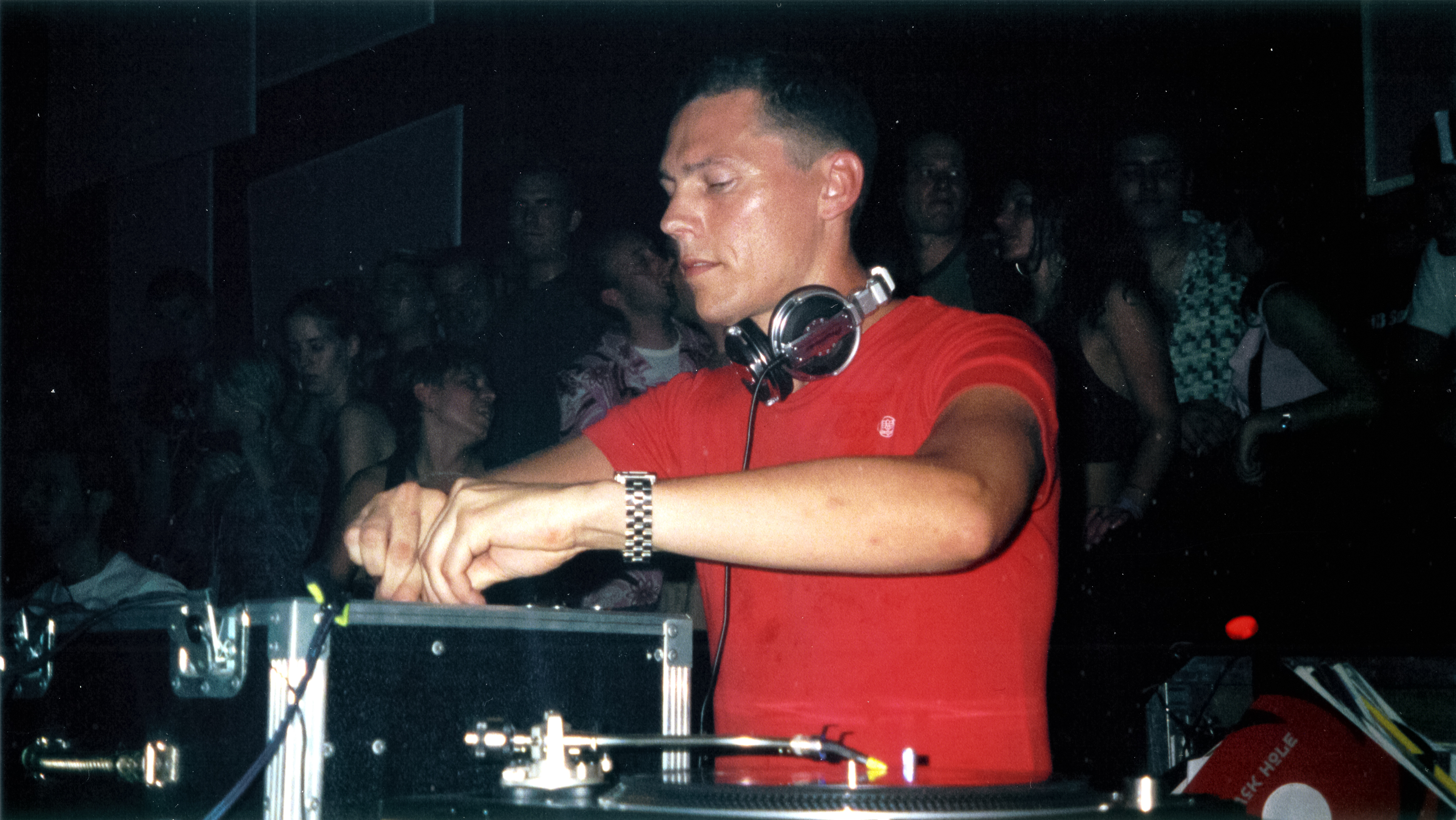
Tiësto at Columbiahalle in Berlin, 2003

On 27 February, Tiësto was awarded a Zilveren ('Silver') Harp music award. The same year he also received a Lucky Strike Dance Award in the category Best DJ Trance/Progressive. In August he became part of Moby's Area2 Tour. For eighteen days he travelled through the United States with artists such as Moby himself, but also David Bowie and Busta Rhymes. In January 2003, Tiësto received the annual Dutch Popprijs ('Pop Award') during the Noorderslag festival. After touring with Moby, Tiësto remixed two songs from him, "We Are All Made of Stars" and "Extreme Ways" in the same year, having "We Are All Made of Stars" reach No. 13 in the Hot Dance Club Play. In 2002 he released his first In Search of Sunrise mix to feature a place on its name, In Search of Sunrise 3: Panama. On 28 March 2003; Tiësto, Dieselboy, Bad Boy Bill, and Noel Sanger joined the PlayStation 2 Dual Play tour. Tiësto and Noel's appearance began on 13 April and ended on 6 June.

His fame continued to increase for then known he has in the early 2000s, following his six-hour "Tiësto Solo" sets which he performed without other DJs or opening acts. This idea, of one DJ playing alone to a large crowd was new. Tiësto was the first DJ to hold a solo concert in a stadium; on 10 May 2003, he performed for 25,000 people in Arnhem's GelreDome, later called Tiësto in Concert. He repeated the same type of concert the following year during two consecutive nights in late October. In addition to holding these two concerts for 35,000 of his fans, he held another concert for a crowd of 20,000 in Hasselt, Belgium the following week. DVDs of both his 10 May 2003 and 30 October 2004 concerts have been released, having the other DVD titled Tiësto in Concert 2. The DVDs show the journey from the first idea to the main event, featuring live performances by Andain, Dinand Woesthoff, and Jan Johnston. The event includes live music and dancers performing at different times throughout the set.

=== 2004–2006: Just Be and appointment to the Order of Orange-Nassau ===
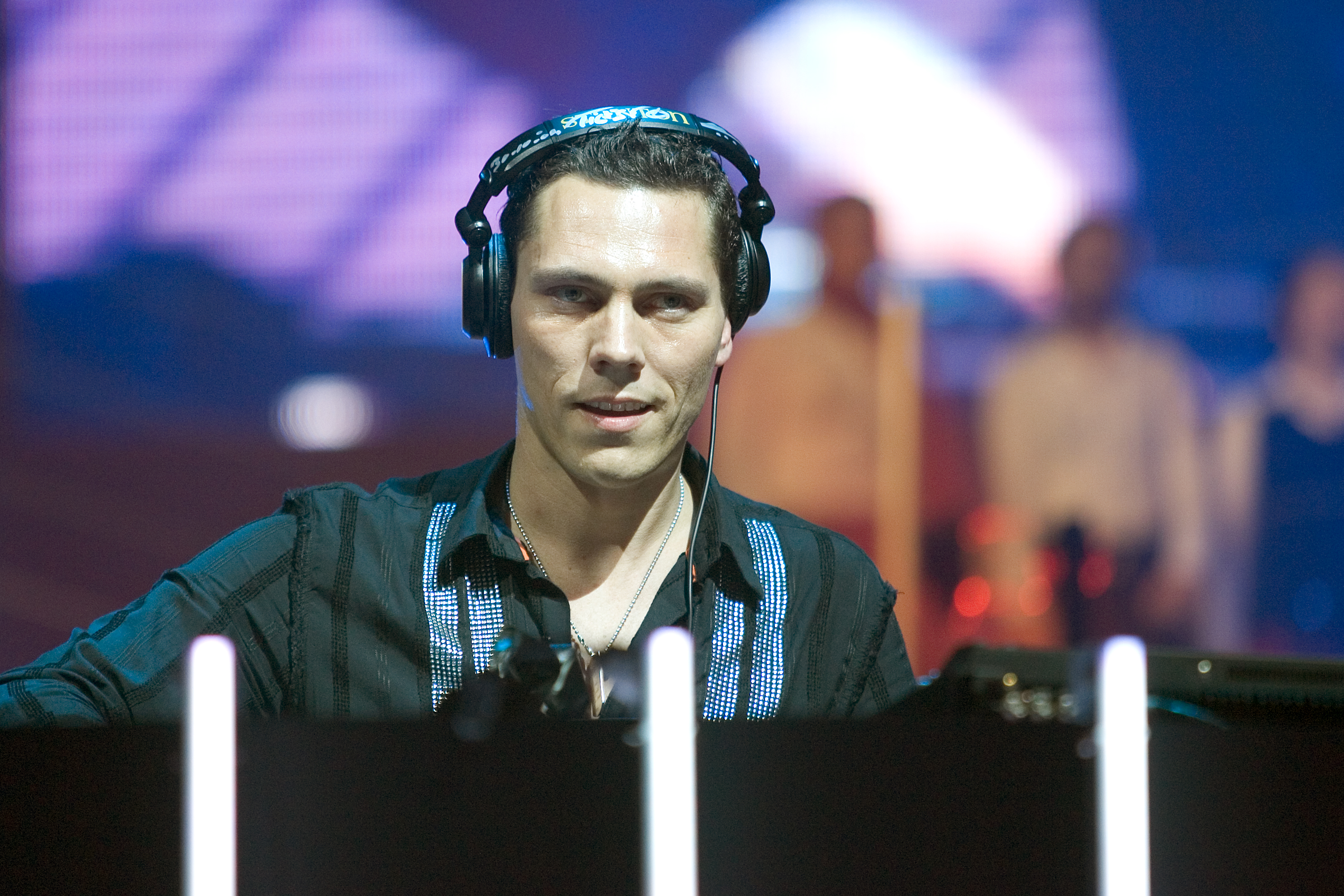
Tiësto performing in Arnhem's GelreDome, 2004

In 2004, he released his second artist album Just Be, which featured his first single "Traffic" which is the first non-vocal track to reach number one spot in the Dutch national charts for 23 years.

The track "Sweet Misery" was originally written for Evanescence but it did not meet the deadline for the release of their album. In support to his Just Be album, he played at Breda, Eindhoven, Utrecht, and Amsterdam; these stops were later named Just Be: Train Tour. On 20 May 2004, he was appointed Officer of the Order of Orange-Nassau by Her Majesty Queen Beatrix of the Netherlands. The Athens Organizing Committee for the Olympic Games (ATHOC) asked Tiësto to perform at the Olympic Games, making him the first DJ to play live on stage at an Olympic Games at the 2004 Summer Olympics opening ceremony in Athens, where he played for 90 minutes.

External videos
- Tiësto – Adagio For Strings (Official Music Video)

Tiësto flew to Athens in January 2004 to have a meeting with the ATHOC. His Tiësto in Concert DVD caught their attention, after which he was asked to write more tracks based on his opening tune "Adagio for Strings" which would fit in with the Olympic spirit and combine the classical with the modern age. The first rehearsal was on 7 August, for an empty stadium; the second rehearsal was on 8 August, with 35,000 volunteers. The last rehearsal included almost 60,000 people in the stadium which was on 10 August.

During the course of his performance at the Olympics, the Dutch athletes started dancing in front of the DJ booth and had to be moved on by officials. The performance included new tracks produced especially for the Opening Ceremony and songs that were created to complement the spirit and theme of the ceremony. A condensed studio-recorded album of the songs played on the Olympic set was later released, including new songs specially composed for the occasion, entitled Parade of the Athletes in October 2004. In the liner notes, he noted the IOC requested that the music not contain any lyrics as they could be inadvertently misinterpreted. In late 2004, he began his touring across Latin America, with his release of In Search of Sunrise 3: Panama in which he gained influence from the sun and sand in summer 2002. The tour continued in 2005, and Tiësto performed live in Brazil, Argentina, Chile, Panama, Peru, Costa Rica, Uruguay, Paraguay, Ecuador, Venezuela and Colombia. Following the tours, In Search of Sunrise 4: Latin America was released in 2005, featuring a second CD for the first time in the In Search of Sunrise series.

In 2005, his Perfect Remixes Vol. 3 compilation was released through Warlock Records, containing ten tracks which were created during the beginning of his career, between those is Junkie XL, Mauro Picotto and The Roc Project. On 20 August 2005, Verwest took Tiësto in Concert to the US when he played to 16,000 at the Los Angeles Memorial Sports Arena with Cirque du Soleil dancers.

For the second year in a row he performed live at a New Year's Eve/New Year's concert in Las Vegas, Nevada at the Orleans Arena to a sell-out crowd. His four-city U.S. tour was postponed due to the hurricane damage in New Orleans and Miami. BPM magazine has an annual poll in the US which is unveiled in the WMC, in 2005 Tiësto took the No. 1 spot. The influences of Los Angeles remained with him and would later influence his In Search of Sunrise compilation.

A wax sculpture of Tiësto was placed behind a turntable at Madame Tussauds in Amsterdam where visitors can mix Tiësto's music together. Stops were made in Ukraine, Slovakia, Serbia, Macedonia, Romania, Hungary, the Czech Republic, Turkey, Croatia, Poland and South Africa. The United States tour that was part of Tiësto in Concert was dwarfed by his appearance at Sensation White in 2006 where he performed to over 45,000 people in Amsterdam. The compilation was launched in the Winter Music Conference in Miami Beach to support his release, Tiësto went on his In Search of Sunrise 5 Asia Tour for more than three weeks. In September 2006, Tiësto was admitted to hospital after experiencing pain in his chest. He was diagnosed with pericarditis and subsequently had to cancel a number of shows. With the diagnosis, he was invited to support Dance4Life to help teens who are not aware of the risks of HIV/AIDS.

=== 2007–2008: Elements of Life ===
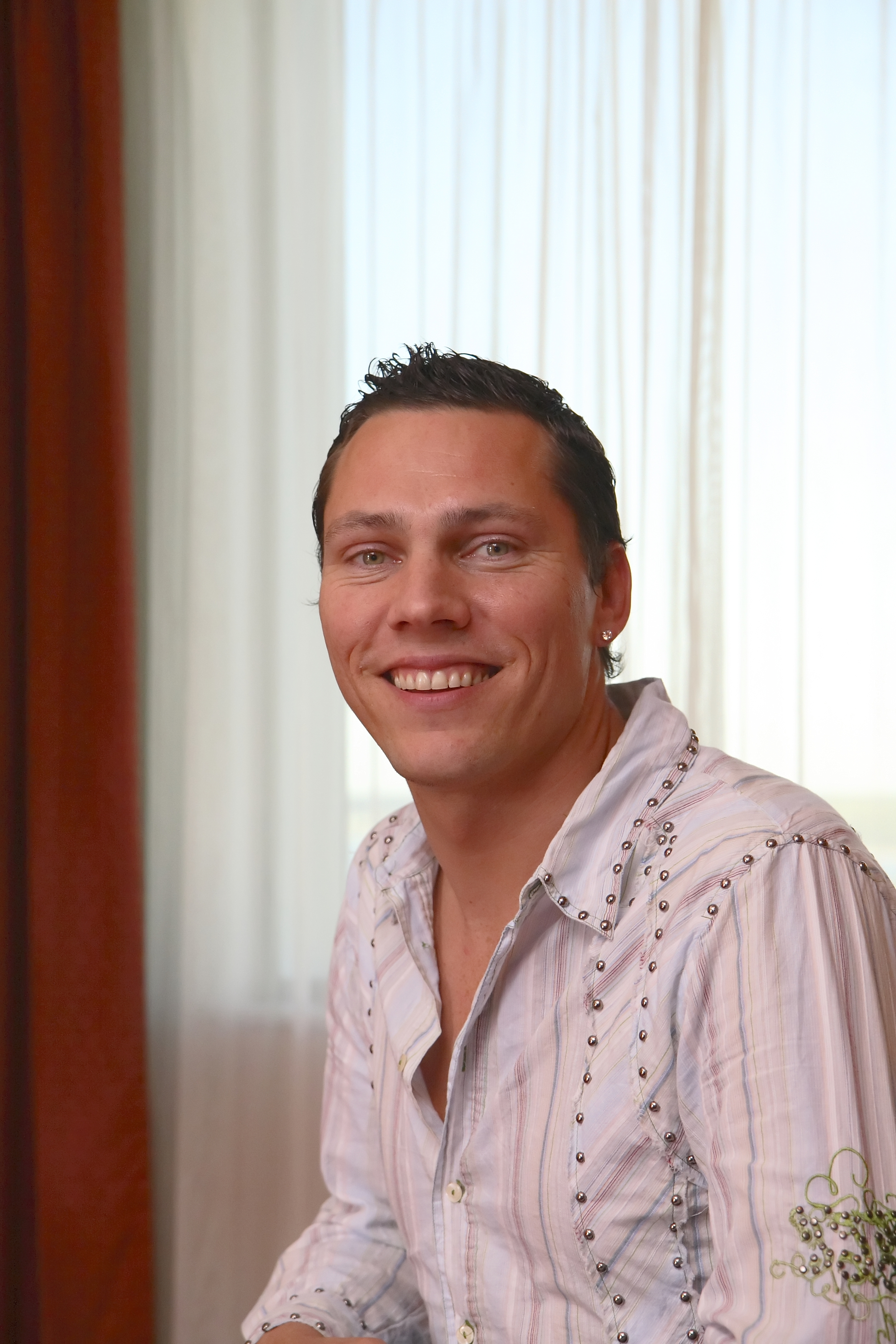
Tiësto in Tallinn, 2007

On 6 April 2007, Tiësto began presenting a new weekly two-hour radio show called Tiësto's Club Life on Dutch radio station Radio 538. Ten days later, Tiësto released his third studio album Elements of Life. The album moved 73,000 units in its April release, according to Nielsen SoundScan.

During the production of the album Tiësto in several cases sent a demo with the music to certain artists, and they replied back with the lyrics and vocals and other duration times. In the case of Christian Burns from BBMak, Tiësto met him through MySpace and contacted him and the production of the single "In the Dark". The album consists of rock, trance and experimental music, which shows the style Tiësto has grown throughout the years since his previous albums which contained lyrics, In My Memory and Just Be. Producer Brian Transeau collaborated with Tiësto in three tracks, he composed "Bright Morningstar" and "Sweet Things", and performed the vocals in the single "Break My Fall". Together, they produced more tracks which were not released in the album, Tiësto has mentioned they would work again during the coming summer.

External videos
- Tiësto – Elements of Life (Official Music Video)

In December 2007 it was announced that the album was nominated for a Grammy Award, in the category "Best Electronic/Dance Album." The album also received gold certifications in Belgium, Hungary, Netherlands, and Romania. In support of the album, he embarked on the worldwide Elements of Life World Tour, and released the Copenhagen: Elements of Life World Tour DVD in 2008.

Tiësto announced his residence at Privilege. He played sets in Ibiza every Monday, from 7 July to 22 September in the style of his In Search of Sunrise series. In 2007, he had released In Search of Sunrise 6: Ibiza which was inspired by the island.

On 28 April, he released Elements of Life: Remixed, a recompilation of the Elements of Life album with all remixed versions. In mid-2008, Tiësto announced his In Search of Sunrise: Summer Tour 2008, which was presented by Armani Exchange in May in support of his In Search of Sunrise 7: Asia compilation and the previously released In Search of Sunrise 6: Ibiza.

=== 2009–2012: Kaleidoscope and Kiss from the Past ===
On 6 October 2009, he released his fourth studio album Kaleidoscope, which featured artists such as Priscilla Ahn, Calvin Harris, Tegan & Sara and Nelly Furtado. Unlike his earlier albums, which were all mostly trance, Kaleidoscope explores other electronic genres, and is considered Tiesto's most experimental album. The first single "I Will Be Here" featuring Sneaky Sound System being released in July 2009. It reached number three on the much acclaimed Driscoll 5, and lasted there for 24 weeks in the beginning of 2012. In its first week, the album reached the Top 10 chart on iTunes. To release the album he set up a new record label called Musical Freedom after parting ways with Black Hole Recordings. Tiësto felt that his music was evolving in a new direction and his focus as an artist was moving away from what Black Hole was set up to support. His new tour, sharing the name of his new album, called Kaleidoscope World Tour commenced in late September.

On 16 March 2010, he released a greatest hits album, Magikal Journey: The Hits Collection 1998–2008, a two disc album focusing on his most famous songs and remixes of his songs. On 7 April, he announced that he would start a new compilation series called A New Dawn with his own label Musical Freedom. In his interview Tiësto furthermore confirmed that he would no longer have any more involvement with Black Hole Recordings. On 31 August, Kaleidoscope: Remixed was released, a remix album of his album Kaleidoscope.

Also in 2009 and 2010, Tiësto contributed songs to both the DJ Hero and DJ Hero 2 video games and is a playable character in the second game. He also produced a trance-flavored song for Memphis rap duo Three 6 Mafia's album called "Feel It", which features Sean Kingston and Flo Rida.

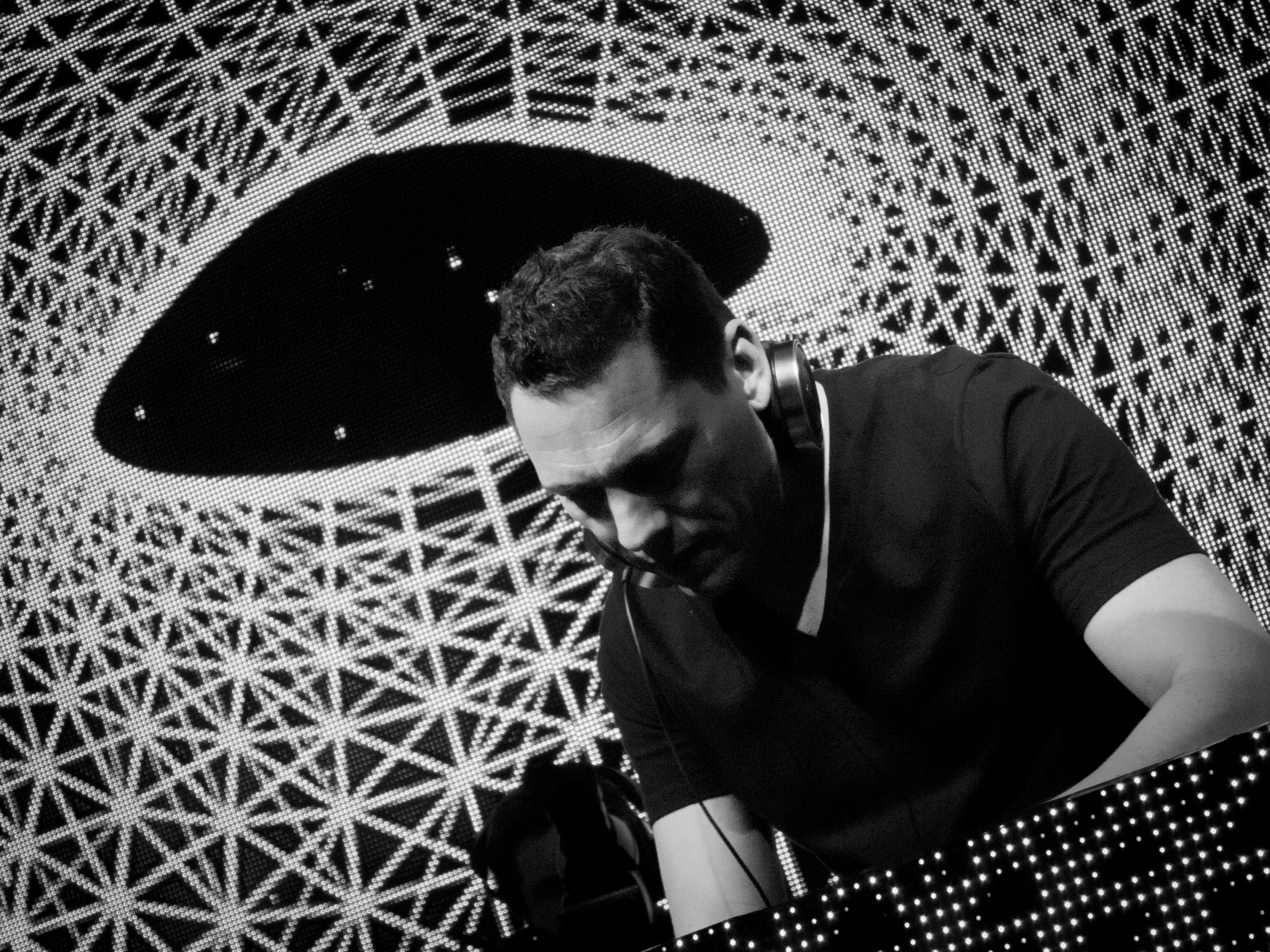
Tiësto performing at the 2012 Consumer Electronics Show

On 4 April 2011, his mix compilation Club Life: Volume One Las Vegas was released. On 13 June, his final trance studio album, Kiss from the Past, was released under his alias Allure, and featured Christian Burns, JES, and Emma Hewitt.

In March 2012, satellite radio broadcaster Sirius XM launched Tiësto's Club Life Radio, one of five dance/electronic stations on the platform. Programming was "curated by Tiësto himself". The station ran until 2017.

=== 2013–2018: Club Life and A Town Called Paradise ===
External videos
- Tiësto – Red Lights (Official Music Video)

Club Life: Volume Three Stockholm was released worldwide physically on 25 June 2013 and it hit No. 16 on the Billboard Top 200 Chart. He followed up his third "Club Life" installment with the 2014 effort, A Town Called Paradise. The album featured an assortment of guest stars and was preceded by two singles, "Red Lights" and "Wasted" – yielding his first two gold singles in the U.S. A medley from the album also soundtracks a presentation at the Bellagio fountain in Las Vegas, a first for a dance music artist.

In a 2014 interview with DJ Magazine, Tiësto revealed why he left trance music. When asked whether his decision to leave the genre was influential to his popularity in the United States, the Dutch producer said: "Maybe, it's hard to say. I think I'd still be the 'Tiesto trance guy' but the difference is you're not really being relevant. Some of the old trance guys still have their following but it doesn't feel like anybody really cares – and that's the biggest difference. It's nice to be in touch with the new kids who are coming up – the 16 and 18-year olds who are producing house music see me as kind of a godfather, and it's really cool to be in touch with them. I think if I'd still been a trance DJ, they'd have been so disconnected with that sound that I wouldn't be much inspiration for them, and vice versa."

In 2015, at the 57th Annual Grammy Awards, he won the Grammy Award for Best Remixed Recording, Non-Classical for his remixed version of John Legend's hit "All of Me". The same year his fourth installment of the Club Life compilation series, titled Club Life: Volume Four New York City, was released through Musical Freedom. In April 2016, he launched a deep house label, AFTR:HRS, to promote deep house music. He appeared in the 2016 Grammy-nominated documentary film about American DJ and producer Steve Aoki, titled I'll Sleep When I'm Dead.

On 14 January 2017, Tiësto was awarded the key to the city of Las Vegas. The day is now known as "Tiësto Day" in Clark County, Nevada. He was featured in the 2017 documentary starring Carl Cox and Martin Garrix, titled What We Started.

On 6 October 2017, the fifth installment of the Club Life series entitled Club Life, Vol. 5 – China was published. The compilation album features tracks by John Christian, SWACQ, Tiësto and Z.Tao, and collaborations between Tiësto and Aloe Blacc, John Christian, Dzeko, Diplo, KSHMR, Talay Riley, Sevenn, Stargate, SWACQ and Vassy.

In March 2018, Billboard named Tiësto as number eight on their 2018 ranking of dance musicians titled Billboard Dance 100.

On 30 March 2018, Tiësto released his debut EP titled I Like It Loud, featuring four songs that are collaborations with artists such as John Christian, Mesto, Matisse & Sadko and MOTi.

=== 2018–2020: The London Sessions ===
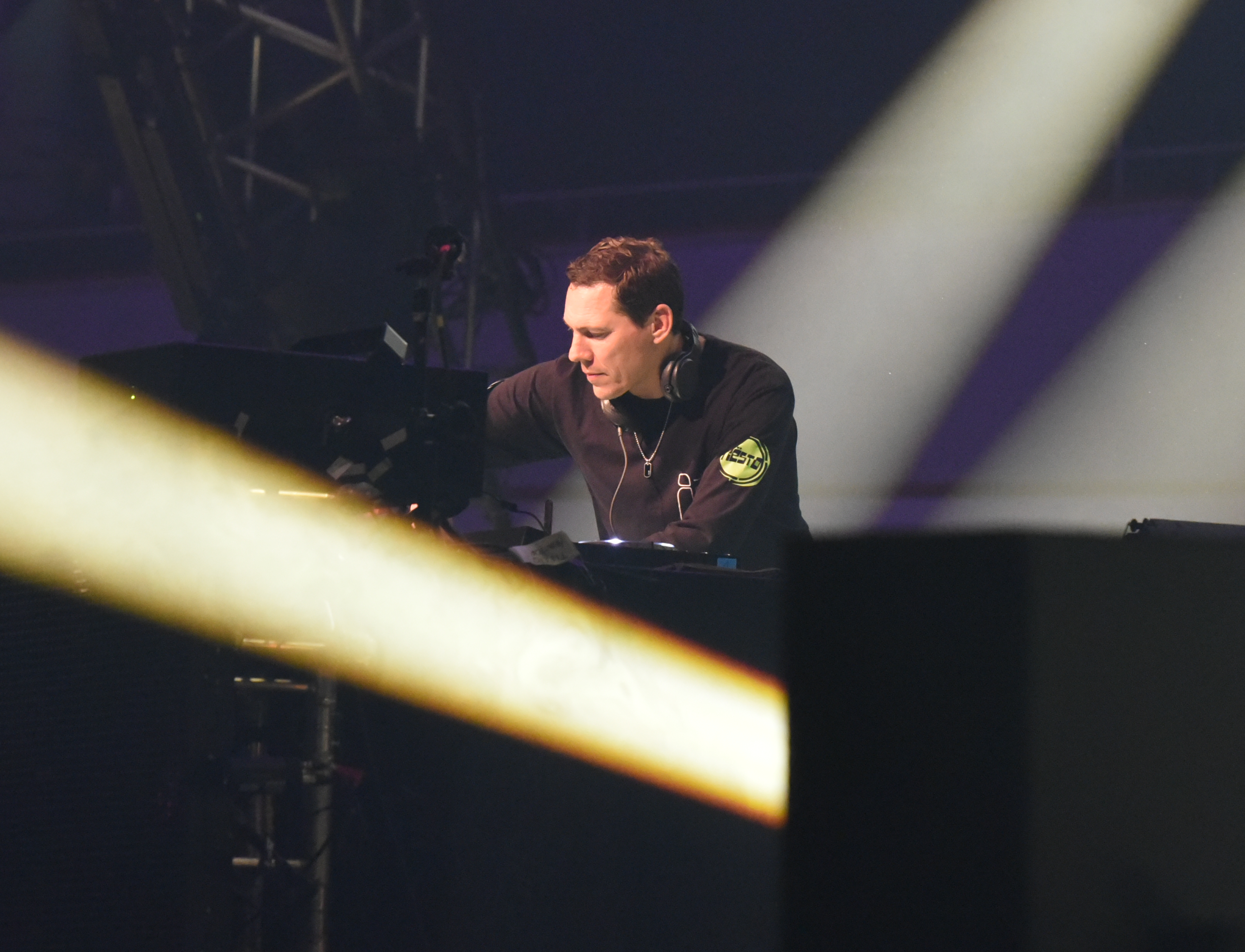
Tiësto performing at Mayday, 2019

On 2 July 2018, Tiësto released with Dzeko, Post Malone and Preme a track titled "Jackie Chan".

On 31 May 2019, Tiësto released with Rita Ora and Jonas Blue a track called "Ritual".

On 14 June 2019, Tiësto released his remix of Avicii's posthumous "Tough Love".

On 7 May 2020, Tiësto announced a new album, The London Sessions, on Twitter; it was released on 15 May 2020. The album features the previously released singles "Jackie Chan", "Ritual", "God Is a Dancer", "Blue" and "Nothing Really Matters".

=== 2020–present: Drive and Prismatic ===
On 25 September 2020, Tiësto released the song "The Business". On 21 January 2021, Tiësto released a remix version of the song titled "The Business, Pt. II" featuring American rapper Ty Dolla Sign.

On 28 May 2021, Tiësto released his remix of Ben Platt's "Imagine." Later that year, he released "Don't Be Shy" with Karol G on 12 August, "The Motto" with Ava Max on 4 November, Savage with Deorro and a remix of No Mienten and You got the Love by Becky Hill.

On 30 June 2022, Tiësto released "Hot In It" with English singer Charli XCX. The track was previously teased by Charli XCX and Tiësto multiple times on TikTok. On 7 October 2022, Tiësto released a remake of Black Eyed Peas song "Pump It" called "Pump It Louder". On 3 November 2022, Tiësto released "10:35" with Tate McRae.

On 6 January 2023, Tiësto released "Lay Low". On 9 March 2023, Tiësto officially announced his new studio album called Drive, along with the release of his single "All Nighter". The album was released on 21 April 2023.

On 11 February 2024, Tiësto was scheduled to perform at Super Bowl LVIII in Las Vegas both before and during the game, which would have made him the first DJ to perform throughout the Super Bowl. However, he canceled his performance due to a family emergency and was replaced by Kaskade.

In January 2025, Tiësto released the extended play Prismatic: Pack One, which featured collaborations with Oaks, Jordan Shaw, and Alex Mills.

In March 2025, it was announced that Tiësto would premier a new "In Search of Sunrise" set at EDC Las Vegas 2025. In April, the 2025 Formula 1 Crypto.com Miami Grand Prix promoted an entertainment lineup to include Tiësto, Pitbull, Kygo and Kaskade.

On 19 December 2025, Tiesto delivered a three and a half hour concert at the Giza Pyramid Complex, Egypt on a circular stage in the Pyramids Arena with his Prismatic show . The show featured 8 new IDs and many familiar pieces of the veteran DJ. DJ Tiesto uploaded the Pyramids set to his YouTube channel.

Tiesto also recently performed at Coachella 2025.

On 27 December 2025, he ended his radio show Club Life after 978 episodes. He later announced that a new radio show, Prismatic, that features music from his previous iteration that made him famous: trance and progressive. The new show was launched on 2 January 2026.

In late 2025, Tiësto signaled a broader return to his trance roots, a shift noted by electronic music publication DJ Mag. The transition included a revival of visual elements associated with his early career and a renewed focus on trance-oriented sounds.

== Income ==
Forbes estimated that Tiësto's annual income for 2017 was $39 million, with an average nightly gross of $250,000.

== Philanthropy ==
On 6 January 2005, Tiësto performed in an outdoor fundraiser in De Dam, Amsterdam. The free event involved Dutch artists such as Tiësto, Dinand Woesthoff, BLØF, Acda & De Munnik, Di-rect, and Trijntje Oosterhuis and provided financial aid to the people who suffered from the 2004 Indian Ocean earthquake and tsunami in southern and southeastern Asia.

In April 2006, Tiësto was named the official worldwide ambassador for the Dance4Life foundation promoting awareness of HIV/AIDS. As the foundation's ambassador he has helped the organisation with fundraising along with recording the track "Dance4life" that he recorded with Maxi Jazz from Faithless. The foundation consists on a better way of living with safe sex in exchange of entertainment to the young crowd. The song was a huge success, peaking for five weeks in number 3 and eleven consecutive weeks in the Top 10 of the Dutch Singles Chart, it reached number 5 in Belgium, number 6 in Finland and also charting in the United Kingdom and Germany.

With the successful release of Elements of Life, Tiësto and fashion designer Giorgio Armani collaborated on a limited edition Tiësto T-shirt; Tiësto's single "Sweet Things" comes with the shirt and includes an exclusive "A|X Remix" by Tom Cloud. The charity raised over U.S. $300,000.

In November 2012, Tiësto released a compilation album Dance (RED) Save Lives in collaboration with Product Red, with the aim of donating any proceeds from the album to the fight against AIDS.

In June 2014, Tiësto headlined the first-ever Thank You Festival, presented by Global Citizen in partnership with World Childhood Foundation. As a part of the festival campaign, Tiësto took part in supporting ThankYou.org. For every song shared, the Carlson Family Foundation donated $5 to the World Childhood Foundation.

In September 2014, Tiësto headlined the free Global Citizen Festival in New York's Central Park.

== Personal life ==
In September 2019, Tiësto married Annika Backes, a model, 27 years his junior, in Amangiri, Utah, after proposing to her in 2018. In November 2020, they had a daughter, and on 27 August 2022, they had their second child, a son. He is a fan of Italian football club Inter Milan, and has collaborated with them on numerous occasions.

== Discography ==
Studio albums

- In My Memory (2001)
- Just Be (2004)
- Elements of Life (2007)
- Kaleidoscope (2009)
- A Town Called Paradise (2014)
- The London Sessions (2020)
- Drive (2023)

== Filmography ==
Documentary and concert films

- Clublife 500 (2016) - In celebration of the 500th episode of his radio show Clublife, Tiësto hosted a special, one-night-only event on 21 October 2016, at the Ziggo Dome in Amsterdam. On 31 October 2023 the show was made available to stream on demand via the On Air concert streaming service.
- He appears in the film F1 as the host DJ.

== Awards and nominations ==
Awards and achievements
Preceded by John Digweed	DJ Magazine Number 1 DJ; 2002–2004	Succeeded by Paul Van Dyk
