= Tempo Giusto (composer) =

Finnish DJ, producer and composer

- Born: Tuomas Aarne Juhana Lähteenoja; 31 July 1986 (age 39)
- Origin: Turku, Finland
- Genres: Trance, techno, film score
- Occupations: DJ, producer, composer
- Years active: 2007–present
- Labels: Echelon Records; Universal Music; Armada Music; Black Hole Rec; Enhanced Music; ToneArts Studios
- Website: tempogiusto.fi

Tuomas Aarne Juhana Lähteenoja (born on 31 July 1986) known by his stage name, Tempo Giusto, is a Finnish trance music DJ, producer and composer.

== Career Overview ==
He is one of the leading names of tech trance and debuted in 2008 with the single "Agent Orange". Since then he has released music with many known electronic dance music labels such as Black Hole Recordings, Armada Music, Ultra Records and Spinnin Records. He also owns the Finland-based Echelon Records with his older brother Ima'gin. Their collaboration on "Gemini" resulted in #1 trance release on Beatport in June 2012. In 2019 Tempo Giusto's collaborative track "Mr. Navigator" with Armin van Buuren resulted in a #1 charting trance single on Beatport. In total Tempo Giusto holds 12 Beatport Top 10 trance singles. In 2019, Tempo Giusto was nominated 'Electronic Music Artist' of the year at the Emma-gaala.

== Education ==
Tempo Giusto graduated from SAE Institute with a bachelor's degree in Audio Production and Recording Arts in 2011 and is currently studying dentistry at the University of Turku.

== Producing and composing ==
Including his solo work, Tempo Giusto has also collaborated with several artists including Grammy nominated artists Armin van Buuren and Mike Koglin, Mark Sherry, Alex M.O.R.P.H., Lange, Ima'gin and The Gambit. He also owns a film score and sound design company ToneArts Studios that has worked with TeliaSonera, Orion Corporation, Uponor, Nunnauuni etc. ToneArts Studios has also worked with Finnish National Board of Education and Population Register Centre.

== Performance ==
Tempo Giusto's concert tours have included the Netherlands, the United Kingdom, Sweden, Russia, Australia, Spain, Canada, Japan, Finland, and Romania among others.

== Discography ==
=== Singles and EPs ===
2008

- Collateral (Abora Recordings)
- Kinetics (RealBeatz Recordings)
- Pure & Sweet with Jace (Finity Digital)
- Agent Orange / Calling (Echelon)
- In Hypnosis EP (Echelon)
- One Among Others / Mexican Vagabond (Echelon)
- Challenger (Bonzai Records)
- Reminiscence (Wavedata)
- Reboot (Echelon)
- Stuka / Vendetta (Echelon)

2009

- Blow EP (Echelon)
- Fumarole EP (Echelon)
- X (Echelon)
- Ignition EP (Echelon)
- Tick Tock (Black Hole Recordings)
- Hypnotize (Sunset to Sunrise)
- Atomic Clock (Echelon)
- Quadric Maze / Deeper State of Mind (Echelon)
- Crusader / 22 (Echelon)
- Voyager with Jace (Finity Digital)
- The Name Game (Black Hole Recordings)
- Don't Look Back EP (Echelon)

2010

- Raptor (Detox)
- Metropolitan (Black Hole Recordings)
- Stockticker (Echelon
- Diesel (Echelon)
- Flamingo (Echelon)
- Jekku (Echelon)
- The Whip with Ima'gin (Premier)

2011

- Unknown Dancer / Circus Maximus (Echelon)
- Espionage / In Need for Speed (Echelon)
- Information Transparency with Ima'gin (Echelon)
- Dodger (Echelon)
- Oszma with Ima'gin (Echelon)

2012

- Scalar with Mike Koglin (Armada)
- Velvet Kiss / Diamonds for Hearts (Echelon)
- Gemini with Ima'gin (Echelon)
- Dive into the Echo (Echelon)

2013

- Demigod (Echelon)
- Crunk with Mike Koglin (Echelon)
- Ultraist / Cabo Rico (Echelon)
- Blacksmith (Echelon)
- Europia / Daliesque Remixes (Echelon)
- Crunk / Blacksmith Remixes (Echelon)

2014

- American Dream (Echelon)
- Bang Ram (Echelon)
- MOCKBA (Echelon)
- Game Changer (Lange Recordings)
- V12 (Echelon)
- Architekt / Propulsion (Echelon)
- Cartel (Echelon)
- Infiltrator with Jace Headland (Outburst Records)

2015

- Benzin (Lange Recordings)
- Silent Manhattan with Jace Headland (Easy Summer)
- Angry Dwarf with Jace Headland (Lange Recordings)
- Blast Radius (Echelon)
- Spatter Analysis (Lange Recordings)
- Dynamo (Lange Recordings)

2016

- Tranceborn with Jace Headland (Echelon)
- Cujo [Create Music (Black Hole)]
- Majestic with Alex M.O.R.P.H. (Universal Nation)
- Open Your Eyes (Kearnage Recordings)
- Pick Your Poison (Lange Recordings)
- Time to Tango (Armada Captivating)
- Pichinko (Outburst Records)
- Break Free (Nicksher Music)
- Velvet Boulevard (Nicksher Music)

2017

- Don't Give a Quack (Outburst Records)
- Ultraviolet (FSOE Clandestine under Future Sound of Egypt B.V.)
- Super Cool (Outburst Twilight Records)
- Foul Language (Kearnage Recordings)
- Burn (FSOE Clandestine under Future Sound of Egypt B.V.)
- Past x Future (A State of Trance under Armada Music B.V.)

2018

- Automatika (Outburst Twilight Records)
- Raindance (Outburst Records)
- Contra (Outburst Records)
- Solace In Your Eyes (Decade Mix) (A State of Trance under Armada Music B.V.)
- Trance Runner (A State of Trance under Armada Music B.V.)

2019

- Voodoo (Grotesque Records)
- Dopamine (Kearnage Recordings)
- Connection Failure (Outburst Records)
- Dakini (A State of Trance under Armada Music B.V.)
- Mr. Navigator with Armin van Buuren (Armind under Armada Music B.V.)

=== Remixes ===
- 2008 Ima'gin – Requiem for an Angel (Echelon)
- 2008 Valve – Clarity (Neuroscience)
- 2008 Tradeus – Selene (RealAMPlified Music)
- 2009 Lodos – Gloom (Echelon)
- 2009 Brian Flinn – North Bound (Echelon)
- 2009 Inglide – On a Wave (Colorful Recordings)
- 2009 Eddie Sender – Sandwalker (Monster Digital)
- 2009 George Vemag – Anakonda (Bonzai Records)
- 2009 Platen & Clarks – Caladesi (Sunset to Sunrise)
- 2009 Artimes – Precious Time (Only One Records)
- 2009 Julius Beat – Greater than Yourself (Black Hole Recordings)
- 2009 Phynn – Spacewalk (Black Hole Recordings)
- 2009 Thom V – Generator (Sunset to Sunrise)
- 2009 Alex Kunnari – Last Sunrise (In Trance We Trust)
- 2009 Hyydro & KaltFlut – Ocean Feeling (Redux Recordings)
- 2009 Chris de Seed vs. Vojt van Twistigen – Metamorphose (Echelon)
- 2009 Ima'gin – Chechnya EP (Echelon)
- 2009 Tigran Oganezov – Neanderthal (Spinnin Records)
- 2009 T.O.M. & Melvin Spix – Incredible Connection (In Trance We Trust)
- 2009 P.O.S & Mike Koglin – Autumn (Anjunabeats)
- 2009 Joey V – Show Me the Noise (Detox)
- 2009 Ercossa & Twistigen – Interference (Echelon)
- 2010 Mark Sherry – Seismic (Detox)
- 2010 Talla 2xlc – Pro Life (Addicted to Trance)
- 2010 Jo Micali – Beyond the Sea (Well Mixed Records)
- 2010 Kenneth Thomas – Iron Sharpens Iron (Echelon)
- 2011 Amex & Bartlett Bros feat. Lizzie Curious – A New Dawn (Black Hole Recordings)
- 2013 Solarstone & Orkidea – Slowmotion II (Solaris)
- 2014 Tucandeo – C.T.U. (Afterglow)
- 2014 Mallorca Lee feat. Ross Ferguson – She Daid (MLXL)
- 2015 Mark Sherry – Vengeance (Outburst Records)
- 2015 Corti Organ – Narrow (Outburst Records)
- 2015 Orkidea – Redemption (Black Hole Recordings)
- 2015 Ferry Tayle & Driftmoon – Geometrix (Enhanced Music)
- 2016 Indecent Noise – Come Get Some (Mental Asylum Records)
- 2016 Casey Rasch – What's Next (UNRSTRCTD Recordings)
- 2016 Ben Gold – Atomic (Who's Afraid of 138 under Armada Music B.V.)
- 2017 Protoculture – Music Is More than Mathematics (Armada Music)
- 2017 Mark Sherry & Alex Di Stefano – Everyone Is Looking for Us (Outburst Records)
- 2018 Ben Gold – I'm in a State of Trance (ASOT 750 Anthem) (A State of Trance under Armada Music B.V.)
- 2019 Mark Sherry – Phantasmic (Outburst Records)

=== Studio albums ===
- 2010 Premiering in Theaters (Echelon)
- 2011 Premiering in Theaters Remixed (Echelon)
- 2013 From the Core (Echelon)
- 2014 From the Core Remixes (Echelon)

=== Extended plays ===
- 2016 Break Free (Nicksher Music)
- 2016 Static + Nicked (Create Music under Lange Production Ltd.)

=== Compilation albums ===
- 2012 Global Sound Drift Vol. I (Echelon Records)
- 2017 Outburst presents Prism Volume 2 (Outburst Records)
