= Avanti =

Avanti (in Italian, meaning 'ahead', 'forward', or 'before', and also an unrelated Sanskrit name) may refer to:

== Companies ==
- Avanti (bicycle company), a New Zealand-based bicycle manufacturer
- Avanti Communications, a satellite broadband provider
- Avanti Corporation, an electronic design automation company
- Avanti West Coast, a British train operating company which operates the West Coast Main Line franchise
- Vertriebscenter Avanti, an Austrian chain of gas stations

== Culture ==
- Avanti (label), a sub-label from Black Hole Recordings
- Avanti (magazine), a German women's magazine
- Avanti, a 2012 album by Biel Ballester Trio
- Avanti!, a 1972 film
- Avanti! Chamber Orchestra, a Finnish chamber orchestra
- Avanti! (newspaper), the official newspaper of the Italian Socialist Party
- Avanti un altro!, an Italian game show, and Avanti ¡que pase el siguiente!, the name of the Spanish, Chilean and Paraguayan versions

== Places ==
- Avanti kingdom (Mahabharata), a kingdom mentioned in the ancient Indian epic Mahabharata
- Avanti (region), a historic kingdom in India
  - Ujjain, also known as Avanti, the capital of the Avanti kingdom

== Vehicles ==
- Avanti II, a successor model made by Avanti Motor Corporation
- DC Avanti, Indian designed sports car from DC Design
- Piaggio P.180 Avanti, a business aircraft
- Studebaker Avanti, a model of automobile built by Studebaker

== Other ==
- Avanti (project), a UK Government-sponsored construction collaboration project
- Avanti Racing Team, an Australian UCI Continental cycling team
- Avanti Schools Trust, a sponsor of state-funded Hindu schools in the UK

== See also ==
- Avantika (disambiguation)
- Avanti Kingdom (disambiguation)
