= First State (DJ) =

Dutch disc jockey

- Origin: Dordrecht, South Holland, Netherlands
- Genres: Trance; progressive house
- Occupations: DJ; record producer; remixer
- Years active: 2005–present
- Labels: Magik Muzik; First State; Black Hole
- Members: Sander van der Waal
- Past members: Ralph Barendse; Shane Halcon
- Website: www.firststatemusic.com

First State is a trance act fronted by the Dutch record producer Sander van der Waal, also known as Sander van Dien, who has released three studio albums. Signed to Black Hole Recordings, they have performed internationally and work with vocalists such as Anita Kelsey, Neev Kennedy and Sarah Howells.

== History ==
The duo made their debut in 2005 with a self-titled 12". It was originally a duo consisting of Ralph Barendse and Sander van der Waal, who is also known by his alias Sander van Dien. They released their first studio album, Time Frame in 2007. It features vocal contributions by Tiff Lacey, Anita Kelsey and Elliot Johns. It was supported by the single, "Falling" that was featured on the In Search Of Sunrise compilation. It was followed by "Sierra Nevada" and "Your Own Way". In 2008, the mixed compilation, In Trance We Trust with James Brook, was released in Australia. In January 2009, the duo released the single, "Off The Radar", although Barendse left the project in May of that year.

In 2010, van Dien released the second studio album, Changing Lanes, featuring vocal contributions by Sarah Howells, Kyler England and again Johns. The album was considered to be a stylistical change and explored other genres.

In late 2011, South African DJ and producer Shane Halcon joined the project. In February 2012, they released their first single together "Reloaded". At the end of 2012, Shane Halcon left the project to make a solo career. In March 2014, the third studio album, Full Circle, was released where van Dien again worked with Howells and England, as well as Tyler Sherritt, Neev Kennedy, Jaren Cerf and Quilla.

Besides using the name First State, van der Waal has also released under the name OneWorld and Devoid. A number of co-productions have appeared with his South African manager Shane Halcon.

== Discography ==
=== Studio albums ===
- Time Frame (2007)
- Changing Lanes (2010)
- Full Circle (2014)

=== Compilation albums ===
- In Trance We Trust (2008)

=== Singles ===
- "First State / Sacred" (2005)
- "Falling" (featuring Anita Kelsey) (2007)
- "Your Own Way" (2008)
- "Sierra Nevada" (2008)
- "Off The Radar" (2009)
- "Brave" (featuring Sarah Howells) (2009)
- "Cross the Line" (featuring Relyk) (2010)
- "As You Were" (2010)
- "Cape Point" (2010)
- "Reverie" (featuring Sarah Howells) (2011)
- "Skies On Fire" (featuring Sarah Howells) (2011)
- "Maze" (featuring Tyler Sherritt) (2011)
- "Reloaded" (2012)
- "Holding On" (featuring Max'C) (2012)
- "Why So Serious" (featuring Jake Shanahan) (2012)
- "Seeing Stars" (featuring Sarah Howells) (2013)
- "Humanoid" (2013)
- "Battle Of Hearts" (featuring Fenja)
- "Louders" (2013)
- "Take The Fall" (featuring Relyk) (2014)
- "Scube" (2014)
- "Get Low" (2014)
- "I'am You" (featuring Tom Swoon) (2015)
- "Falling (The Remixes Part 1)" (featuring Anita Kelsey) (2015)
- "Falling (The Remixes Part 2)" (featuring Anita Kelsey) (2015)
- "Glow (Remixes)" (featuring Eric Lumiere) (2015)
- "Chimera" (featuring Eximinds) (2016)
- "Weightless" (featuring Digital X & Aloma Steele) (2016)
- "Falling Down" (with MaRLo) (2017)
- "Moonless Nights" (with Tom Fall featuring Jasmine Maurie) (2017)
- "Resurrected" (with Vigel) (2017)
- "Everywhere" (with Kyler England) (2018)
- "Children of the Masai" (with Shinovi) (2018)
- "Underneath My Skin" (with Sunny Lax featuring Paul Aiden) (2018)

=== Remixes ===
- 2005 – Solar Stone – "Eastern Sea" (First State Remix) (Solaris Recordings)
- 2006 – Midway – "Cobra" (First State's First Aid Remix) (Black Hole Recordings)
- 2007 – Tiësto – "Ten Seconds Before Sunrise" (First State Remix) (Black Hole Recordings)
- 2008 – 4 Strings – "Catch A Fall" (First State Remix) (Maelstrom Records)
- 2008 – Tiësto – "Ten Seconds Before Sunrise" (First State's A Global Taste Remix) (Black Hole Recordings)
- 2008 – Armin van Buuren – "Unforgivable" (First State Remix) (Armada Music)
- 2009 – Bobina (featuring Tiff Lacey) – "Where Did You Go?" (First State Remix) (World Club Music)
- 2009 – Vimana – "We Came" (First State Remix) (Black Hole Recordings)
- 2009 – Ton TB – "Dream Machine" (First State Remix) (In Trance We Trust)
- 2009 – 3 Drives – "Greece 2000" (Sander van Dien Remix) (Massive Drive Recordings)
- 2009 – Jonas Steur (featuring Julie Thompson) – "Cold Winds" (First State Remix) (Black Hole Recordings)
- 2009 – Mac & Mac – "Solid Session" (First State Remix) (Magik Muzik)
- 2009 – Filo & Peri – "Ashley" (First State Remix) (Vandit)
- 2009 – Dash Berlin (featuring Emma Hewitt) – "Waiting" (First State Remix) (Aropa Records)
- 2010 – Dash Berlin (featuring Solid Sessions) – "Janeiro" (First State Remix) (Aropa Records)
- 2010 – Tiësto (featuring Tegan & Sara) – "Feel It In My Bones" (First State Remix) (Musical Freedom)
- 2010 – George Acosta (featuring Fisher) – "Love Rain Down" (First State Remix) (SongBird)
- 2010 – Robbie Rivera (featuring Lizzy Curious) – "Departures" (First State Remix) (Black Hole Recordings)
- 2011 – Blake Lewis – "Till We See The Sun" (First State Remix) (Black Hole Recordings)
- 2011 – Jason van Wyk and Audien – "Someday" (First State Remix) (First State Music)
- 2011 – Jes – "It's Too Late" (First State Remix) (Magik Muzik)
- 2013 - Paul Oakenfold & Disfunktion feat. Spitfire – Beautiful World (Perfecto)
- 2016 – Armin van Buuren (featuring Kensington) – "Heading Up High" (First State Remix) (Armind)
- 2017 - Tiësto (featuring Christian Burns) - "In The Dark" (First State Remix) (Magik Muzik)
- 2020 - Mr Sam featuring Claud9 - "Cygnes" (First State Remix) (Magik Muzik)
