= UCast =

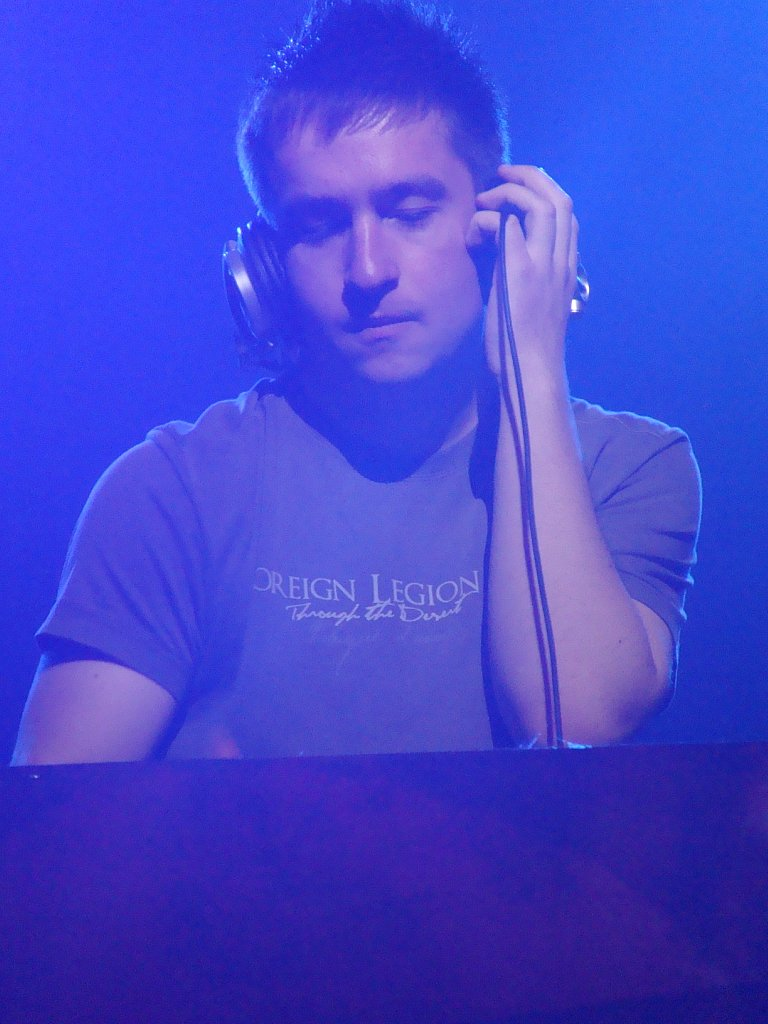
- UCast performing his set at Crossfield 2009

Background information
- Also known as: Ceximo
- Born: Alexei Tsygankov; July 27, 1988 (age 37); Minsk, Belarus
- Genres: Uplifting trance, tech trance, progressive trance
- Occupations: DJ, Music producer
- Years active: 2007–present
- Labels: Armada (Who's Afraid Of 138?), Black Hole (Tytanium), Monster Tunes, Kearnage, LiftedSounds, Interstate Recordings, Unique Sense
- Website: ucastmusic.com

Alexei Tsygankov (Belarusian: Аляксей Цыганкоў; born July 27, 1988), better known by his stage name UCast, is a Belarusian trance DJ and producer from Minsk. He also hosts his own monthly radio show, Injection at DI.fm. UCast has gained global popularity over the years and received support from top artists like Tiesto, Armin van Buuren, Paul Oakenfold, Aly & Fila, M.I.K.E., Dash Berlin, Bobina, Sean Tyas, and many others. In 2010 with a Belarusian electronic duo Poonyk&Oxide he launched his own record label LiftedSounds Records, specializes in uplifting and tech trance music.

== Life and musical career ==
Originally from Minsk, Belarus, Alexei started discovering the world of electronic music in early 90s. But the strongest influence on establishing his musical preferences carried the famous How Much is the Fish from Scooter. His acquaintance with trance music began in 2005 from such DJs as George Acosta and Armin van Buuren. UCast took his first steps into music production in 2006/2007, and soon released his single called Through Depth. During the next two years such tracks as Fuck The Global, Calipso, Metro, Hesperia, One Day were released.

At the same time he started producing, UCast began DJing and his first success came in 2009, when he was playing at Godskitchen Belarus with Sander van Doorn. After that, he was hosting such famous events as Global Gathering, Trancemission, FSOE Anniversary. In 2013 his track Genesis was awarded as "The Tune Of The Week" in the radioshow A State of Trance and Armin van Buuren's mashup UCast vs. MaRLo "Genesis Boom" has been played during his world tour show "ASOT 600. The Expedition Tour".

== Discography ==
=== Singles and EPs ===
- 2007 'Through Depth' [4 Seasons]
- 2007 'Desert Run' [Tranceport Recordings]
- 2008 'Monaco' [Sundesire Records]
- 2008 'Way M1' [Full Access]
- 2008 'Nemo Calling' [Full Access]
- 2008 'Lost Summer' (as Ceximo) [Bitter Sweet]
- 2008 'Way M1' [Full Access]
- 2008 'Stream' [Only One Records]
- 2009 'Fuck the Global' [Mainframe Recordings]
- 2009 'Calipso' [Elliptical Recordings]
- 2009 'Phobos (with Steria)' [Finity Global]
- 2009 'Metro' [Elliptical Recordings]
- 2010 'Hesperia' [Capite Music]
- 2010 'One Day' [Timeline Music]
- 2010 'Aida / Rising Sun EP' [Ask4 Records]
- 2010 'Endeavor EP' [LiftedSounds Records]
- 2011 'Revenge' [Detox Records]
- 2011 'Barracuda' [LiftedSounds Records]
- 2011 'Nova' [Silent Shore Records]
- 2011 'Sunburn' [LiftedSounds Records]
- 2012 'Genesis ' [Interstate Recordings]
- 2013 'Galo' [Infrasonic Future]
- 2013 'Acrobat' [Interstate Recordings]
- 2013 'Klia' [Infrasonic Future]
- 2014 'Ternary' [Interstate Recordings]
- 2014 'Orbitude' [Interstate Recordings]
- 2014 'Vavula' [Unique Sense Records]
- 2014 'Slipstream' [Tytanium Recordings]
- 2014 'Tanity' [Tytanium Recordings]
- 2014 'LAX' [Who's Afraid of 138?!]
- 2015 'Jump (with George Kamelon)' [Who's Afraid of 138?!]
- 2015 'Ramp' [Monster Force]
- 2015 'To Another Day (with Susana)' [Raz Nitzan Music]
- 2016 'Blackout' [Future Sound of Egypt]
- 2016 'Portal' [Grotesque Music]
- 2016 'Gearbox' [Future Sound of Egypt]
- 2016 'Jetlag' [In Trance We Trust]
- 2017 'Icy' [Grotesque Music]

=== Remixes ===
- 2008 PooNyk & Oxide – Stuttgart (UCast Division Remix)
- 2008 Air-T – Perfect Morning (UCast Inout Remix)
- 2009 Exaya – I Want to Be with You (UCast Remix)
- 2009 Air-T – Mountain Wind (UCast Remix)
- 2009 PooNyk & Oxide – Tears Don't Drop (UCast Lifted Mix)
- 2010 Sound Quelle – Existence (UCast Lifted Remix)
- 2010 Light Effect – Valley of Quicksand (UCast Darkroom Remix)
- 2010 Tetarise – Choose the Way (UCast Remix)
- 2010 Poonyk & Oxide Feat. Aelyn – For You (UCast Motion Remix)
- 2010 Mystery Islands – Moonlight Bay (UCast Air Guitar Remix)
- 2011 Global Influence – Sanctum of the Stars (UCast Remix)
- 2012 Second Way – Taking Off (UCast Remix)
- 2012 Dart Rayne – Sophia (UCast Remix)
- 2012 Myk Bee – Impulses (UCast Remix)
- 2012 Devilect & John Dubs – Flaming Hearts (UCast Remix)
- 2013 Air Night – Daisy (UCast Remix)
- 2013 Farzam – The Pyramid (UCast Remix)
- 2013 Holliday & Valker – Amnesia (UCast Remix)
- 2013 Azima Feat. Victoria Ray – Not the Same (UCast Dub Mix)
- 2015 Shogun – City of Angels (UCast Remix)
- 2015 Feel feat. Johnny Norberg – The Razor (UCast Remix)
- 2015 Aly & Fila feat. Karim Youssef & May Hassan – In My Mind (UCast Remix)
- 2015 Outside the Bounds – Orbiter (UCast Remix)
- 2015 Bryan Kearney – Awaken (UCast Rewake)
- 2015 Ana Criado – The Force of the Blow (UCast Remix)
- 2015 Roman Messer feat. Eric Lumiere – Closer (UCast Remix)
- 2015 Photographer & Abstract Vision – Zero Gravity (UCast Remix)
- 2016 Kamaya Painters – Endless Wave (UCast Remix)
- 2016 Indecent Noise – Strikeforce (UCast Remix)
- 2016 Sneijder & Katty Heath – The Only Place (UCast Remix)
- 2016 Bobina & Natalie Gioia – My Everything (UCast Remix)
- 2017 DIM3NSION – Voorpret (UCast Remix)
- 2017 Armin van Buuren – Yet Another Day (UCast Remix)
