= Mark Sherry =

Scottish DJ and record producer

- Also known as: Outburst
- Born: 20 March 1975 (age 51); Ayr Scotland
- Genres: Electronic/Dance Trance Techno
- Occupations: DJ, Producer
- Years active: 1994–present
- Labels: Outburst Records, Perfecto Records

Mark Sherry (born 20 March 1975), is a Scottish DJ and record producer with productions and remixes on Outburst Records/Techburst Records, Reset (Spinnin), Armada, Mental Asylum, High Contrast, Lange & Detox.

== Early career ==
=== Operation Blade ===
Mark Sherry formed Public Domain in 1999 and they had their first big hit in December 2000 with 'Operation Blade'. The track was supported by Judge Jules for 12 weeks consecutively, which led to it going straight in at No. 5 in the UK Top 40. Mark received the Chart Newcomers Award, awarded to celebrate the writer's first entry into the UK Top 20, presented to him by the British Academy of Composers & Songwriters.

The band went on to perform on Top of the Pops and the Pepsi Chart Show in the UK, as well as their German editions. The single went on to enter the top 5 in Germany and Australia and the top 10 in Italy and across Europe. The band gained a Silver Sales award for selling 200,000 copies in first week of release by the BPI in the UK and a Platinum Sales award by Australia's 'Sony Dance' in June 2001.

=== Rock Da Funky Beats ===
In early 2001 the band's follow up single 'Rock Da Funky Beats' peaked at 19 in the UK top 40. The single featured vocals by Chuck D from American hip-hop band 'Public Enemy', who also appeared in the video along with Professor Griff. The music video was recorded at the Natural History Museum in London.

=== Too Many MCs/Let Me Clear My Throat ===
Their third double release single 'Too Many MCs/Let Me Clear My Throat' went to No. 31 in the UK charts in late 2001 with the music video being filmed at Privilege in Ibiza as part of their global tour that year.

== Later career (as Mark Sherry) ==
=== 2006 ===
In May 2006, Sherry was asked to work with trance producer Matt Darey on his 'Urban Astronauts' track 'Animal', which was released on Matt's own label 'Darey Products'.

=== 2007 ===
In May 2007 Sherry launched his radioshow Outburst. In August 2007 Sherry released 'Here Come the Drums' on Detox Recordings with Dr Willis. Later that year, in September, he collaborated on a track called 'Walk Away' with local vocalist Mark Sinclair (Terry Ferminal) on Armin van Buuren's 'Captivating Sounds' as well as remixing for Armin's 'Armind' label on the track 'Firefly' by Mike Foyle. Mark's next remix project in December was for Joey V with his tech-trance single 'Chopperchunk', again on Detox.

=== 2008 ===
In 2008 Sherry was asked to play on the main stage of ID&T's flagship event 'Trance Energy'. Sherry created an exclusive intro track for his set (A Star Within a Star), which was released on High Contrast Recordings later that year. In February 2008, Sherry collaborated with James Allan on 'Eclectic Electric' for Paul Van Dyk's 'Vandit Digital' label and also 'Sectioned' with Dr Willis on Detox. Another remix project for Detox in 2008 was Dazzle's 'Backwards'. Sherry also collaborated with Public Domain on the project SAS 'Comin' On' for the Armada label 'Soundpiercing'. The Estonian outfit 'Polymental' and their single 'Chapter One' was also remixed in this year.

=== 2009 ===
In 2009, Sherry had a total of three number ones in the Beatport Trance chart with his collaboration with James Allan and William Daniel ('Future Primitive'), 'Phantasmic' on Reset Recordings/Spinnin and with a remix of Public Domain's 'Operation Blade' making it to number one in the overall Beatport chart.

=== 2010 ===
In 2010, Sherry was asked to remix for America's official No. 1 DJ Markus Schulz and his label Coldharbour for the Karanda single 'On Hold'. He also remixed the seminal techno classic 'The Prophet' by CJ Bolland.

=== 2011 ===
In 2011, Sherry signed an exclusive two-year artist contract with one of the biggest dance music labels in the world, Spinnin Records. He released a remake of the Clannad classic 'I Will Find You' (the theme tune from 'Last of the Mohicans') with vocalist Sharone. He also released 'Silent Tears' with Sharone and a Latin American-themed track titled 'Sangre Caliente'. Later that year, Sherry was asked to remix for Sander van Doorn's 'Doorn Records' and the track 'Morph' by Ali Wilson and Matt Smallwood, as well as 'Yeke Yeke' by African artist Mory Kante, which made it into the top 10 on the Beatport trance chart. He also remixed Lange's single 'Songless', making it to No. 1 in the Beatport trance chart.

=== 2012 ===
In 2012, the 1980s rock anthem 'Belfast Child' by Simple Minds was sampled by Sherry in his 'My Love' track for Simon Patterson's 'Night Vision' label, charting in the top 10 on Beatport. Later that year, Sherry created a new project with Armada artist David Forbes called 'Pseudonym'. They released a progressive house track called 'The Battle' on Ferry Corsten's label 'Flashover Recordings'.

=== 2013 ===
In January 2013, Sherry released his last original track on Reset recordings with Trailblazer. In April, 'My Love' was remixed by Darren Porter and Jamie Walker on Liquid Recordings with Walker's remix making the top 10 in the Beatport Trance chart. Sherry's 2009 collaboration Phantasmic was remixed by Maarten De Jong and Heatbeat in May and was released as the final Mark Sherry release on Reset.

In August 2013, Sherry's remix of Tempo Giusto's Blacksmith on Echelon got to No. 8 on the Beatport Trance chart and was featured on PvD's VONYC Sessions, closely followed by 'Venomous', a collaboration with rising Scottish artists 2nd Phase on Lange Recordings, which was another top 10 release. Sherry's remix of 'Poltergeist' by Indecent Noise & Eddie Bitar was a game changer for Sherry and kickstarted a new generation of tech trance productions reminiscent of early BXR music with a modern production twist. Poltergeist reached No. 6 on Beatport.

In November 2013, Sherry released the Acidburst & Outburst remixes of Scot Project's seminal classic 'U’ on Perfecto Fluoro.

=== 2014 ===
In March 2014, Max Graham asked Sherry to remix 'The Evil ID'. The track gained a lot of support across the board which led to Sherry playing with Max Graham at his Cycles No. 150 event in Toronto, Canada. The track was released in March on ReBrand and was No. 3 in the Beatport trance chart.

Sherry's May release was a remix for Giuseppe Ottaviani with Aly & Fila titled 'Brilliant People'. The track was another success, leading to him being asked to play the FSOE 350 event in Poland in the summer. Also in May, Sherry continued his support of upcoming talent with a collaboration with 3DW and vocalist Debbie Sharp on Mental Asylum Records. Will Atkinson presented his Darkboy alias on Jordan Suckley's Damaged Records and Sherry was asked to remix it in June 2016. The track hit the No. 6 position on Beatport.

In the same year, to celebrate 20 years as a DJ, Mark Sherry played a series of open to close sets including #TWENTY @ Toika Lounge in Toronto, Canada and Mark's New York City debut for Esscala the following night.

In the summer of 2014, Mark Sherry's 'A Star Within a Star' got a remix package on High Contrast from Alex M.O.R.P.H., James Dymond & Adam Ellis. August 2014 saw the birth of Sherry's own label 'Outburst Records'. The debut release on the label was the 2014 remix of 'Live & learn' (originally on Detox) from Joint Operations Centre (John O'Callaghan) and Alex Di Stefano. This was closely followed by Sherry's first original release on Outburst, a collaboration with vocalist Clare Stagg titled 'How Can I'. Also in August, Sherry made his Coldharbour debut with a remix for label owner Markus Schulz's track 'Remember This', hitting No. 3 on the Beatport Trance chart. In November, his early Detox collaboration with Australian DJ Dr Willis was remixed on Outburst Records by Sean Tyas and Harmonic Rush.

=== 2015 ===
Sherry entered 2015 with a remix for trance megastar Armin Van Buuren called 'Together (in a State of Trance)'. It was followed closely by a collaboration with The Space Brothers titled 'Let it Come' on his own label, Outburst Records. In February 2015, Sherry's early Detox collaboration with Australian DJ Dr Willis was remixed again, this time on the Outburst Records sister techno label Techburst Records. That same day, Sherry's most popular tune of the year was released on Subculture Records. Named after the recently released pictures of the Pillars of Creation from the Hubble Space Telescope, the track went on to be a massive success, taking the No. 3 position on Beatport and No. 1 on Trackitdown. On 19 April 2015, the Damaged Records Volume 1 compilation was released with Mark Sherry and Damaged Records label owner Jordan Suckley mixing a disc each.

Mark Sherry's 2015 tour itinerary exceeded all previous years with appearances at Godskitchen (Birmingham), ASOT700 (Utrecht), The Full on stages at Space (Ibiza), Tomorrowland (Belgium), Boxxed Warehouse (Birmingham) and Dance Valley (Netherlands) with Ferry Corsten, as well as shows at Ruby Skye (San Francisco) and Fresno Fairgrounds (Fresno) for Mental Asylum and Somewhere Loud (San Diego) for the Damaged Records Volume 1 world tour. The year ended with Mark playing the world-famous Stereosonic tour of Australia with sold out shows in Sydney, Perth, Melbourne, Adelaide and Brisbane.

At the end of the summer his second official remix pack was released on Techburst Records with Leon Bolier including WSTLNDR, Destroyer and Balthazar & JackRock techno remixes. Later, in September 2015, Mark Sherry and DJ Scot Project decided to work together on 'Acid Air Raid', a remake of an old 90s classic rave track, both using the parts and making their own mix each. The track made the DMCWorld Buzz Chart and was followed by his remix of Mauro Picotto's 'Eterea' as part of Mauro's artist album on Alchemy Records. In November, Sherry went on to release another collaboration with newcomer Paul Denton titled Hostel on Outburst Records and finally, in December, he released 'Spacewarp', his debut techno track, with Gene Karz. He also released 'Global Eclipse', which was in the top 10 of the hard techno chart for two weeks.

=== 2016 ===
Mark Sherry's Psyburst Mix of Space Frog's "Follow Me" was released on 29 February, followed by a collaboration with Dark Fusion and Jan Johnston called "Dejavu" on 28 March. He also performed at Tomorrowland in Brazil in April, followed by Outburst Australia in May, which saw him performing in Melbourne, Sydney, Adelaide, Darwin and Brisbane. In June 2016 he performed at Cream in Ibiza and released Prism Volume 1.

Further Outburst shows in Argentina (Cordoba and Buenos Aires followed in July, as well as a collaboration with Alex Di Stefano which hit the top 10 in the Beatport chart. Sherry had his debut performance at Creamfields in August, and in December 2016, he released a drum and bass collaboration with Jamie Walker and Ross Ferguson and played his debut at Dreamstate in Los Angeles.

== Radio/Podcast ==
Mark Sherry's Outburst Radio Show is premiered weekly on the world's leading internet trance radio station ah.fm, as well as being syndicated to over 15 other stations worldwide. The show is also available as a podcast through iTunes. The show reached its 300th edition in February 2013 with Sherry hosting a two-hour "Best of Outburst" show. It reached its 500th edition in March 2017.
