= Ralph Barendse =

- Birth name: Ralph Barendse
- Also known as: Ralphie B, Midway, Alpha Breed, First State, Sun Crusaders, One World, Collide1
- Born: 6 April 1977 (age 47); Zwijndrecht, Netherlands
- Genres: Epic trance
- Years active: 1999–present
- Labels: Armada Music, Black Hole Recordings, In Trance We Trust, Vandit

Ralph Barendse (Dutch pronunciation: [ˈrɑl(ə)v ˈbaːrəntsə], born 6 April 1977) is a Dutch DJ and producer of electronic dance music, mainly trance, performing as Ralphie B and Midway. Barendse has also produced remixes for artists in the scene, among them Armin van Buuren, Tiësto, Solarstone, Dario G, and 4 Strings. Barendse's original releases have also been remixed by other artists, including Paul van Dyk, Ronski Speed, Filterheadz, and D. Ramirez.

As a DJ, Barendse has toured, including with Tiësto. Since 2011, Barendse has released several singles under the record label Armada Music.

== Early career ==
Ralph Barendse gained experience with keyboards and tapedecks at a young age. He was inspired by synthesizer music and early "rave tracks", growing up in the Netherlands, where dance music gained popularity. Ralph created his first digital music using music tracker software, and produced various tracks for the demo scene. In 1996 he joined the tracker group "Explizit" and released various tracks under the alias "Mad Max" which he later shortened to "Mekx".

He released his first records in 1999 under the stage name Alpha Breed, while signed to Deal Records. His track "Ralphie B - Massive" was noticed by Tiësto and signed to the In Trance We Trust label of Black Hole Recordings. The track was a hit and was featured by many influential DJs, including Armin van Buuren, who played it at the very first episode of his radioshow A State of Trance. The success continued with releases at In Trance We Trust such as "Midway - Monkey Forest", "Midway - Inca", "Midway - Amazon" and numerous remixes including "Solar Stone - Solarcoaster (Midway remix)".

== First State years ==
In 2005, Barendse started the project First State with Sander van der Waal. As part of this project, Barendse was involved in the production of club hits like "Sierra Nevada", "Evergreen", and "Falling". A First State album "Time Frame” was released, and the duo was asked to remix artists including Van Buuren, Tiësto and 4-Strings. Under the auspices of First State, Barendse toured the world as a DJ.

== After First State ==
In 2009, after producing a few years as First State, Barendse decided to leave the project to focus on his solo projects again. Under the alias "Midway", he released a new solo single "What If" and an album “Equator”.

In 2011, he began producing under his "Ralphie B" alias at Armada Music and produced new singles "Bullfrog", "Delphi", "Epic Battle". He also started a new project "Sun Crusaders", releasing a single, "Oceanic". He remixed "These Silent Hearts", with the remix was premièring at the ASOT500 Parties; it became one of the most successful remixes of a track from Van Buuren's Mirage album.

In 2012, Barendse released "Icarus" and "Demons are Forever". He released a new EP in October 2012, featuring tracks "Face Off" and "The Holy Grail". In 2013, Barendse worked on a co-production with Mesh, "Seize the Day". He also released new single under the "Ralphie B" alias called Ragnarok. In 2015, Barendse released "Helios" and "Hymn of Legends"

In 2017, Ralphie B announced to have a new release scheduled on In Trance We Trust, the label where his success began.

== Discography ==
As Alpha Breed

- "Beyond the Moon" (1999)
- "Epic Future" (2000)
- "Missing Link" (2000)
- "Floating" (2000)
- "X-Pectation" (2000)
- "Enlightment" (2001)

As First State

- "Sacred"
- "First State"
- "Falling"
- "Rhapsody"
- "Sierra Nevada"
- "Evergreen"
- "Your Own Way"
- "Time Frame"
- "Armin van Buuren - Unforgivable (First State Smooth mix)"
- "Tiësto - Ten Seconds Before Sunrise(First State remix)"
- "Children Of The Masai (with Shinovi) (Who's Afraid Of 138?!)

As Midway

- "Amazon"
- "Inca"
- "Cobra"
- "Monkey Forest"
- "Solarcoaster (Midway Remix)"
- "What If"
- "Avalon (Midway Remix)"

As OneWorld

- "Isla Blanca" / "Lingus"

As Ralphie B

- "Massive"
- "Bullfrog"
- "Delphi"
- "Epic Battle"
- "Icarus" (featured on the ASOT2012 compilation)
- "Demons are Forever"
- "Face Off"
- "The Holy Grail"
- "Seize the Day"
- "Helios"
- "Hymn of Legends"
- "Ragnarok"
- "Kingdom"
- "Armin van Buuren - These Silent Hearts (Ralphie B remix)"
- "Dario G - Feels Like Heaven (Ralphie B remix)"
- "Taste Experience - Highlander (Ralphie B remix)"
- "Dreamcatcher - I don't wanna lose my way (Ralphie B remix)"
- "Kingdom"

As Cryo Culture

- "Trancefusion"

As Suncrusaders

- "Oceanic"
