= Avanti (label) =

Record label

- Parent company: Black Hole Recordings
- Founded: 1999
- Founder: Tijs Verwest
- Genre: Electronica; Dance; House; Trance; Progressive Trance
- Country of origin: Netherlands
- Official website: www.blackholerecordings.com

AVANTI, otherwise referred to as AVANTI by Black Hole or written as A¥ANTI, is a sub-label consisting on trance and techno founded by Tiësto in 1999. The label was formerly known as Black Hole Avanti until 2001 when it stopped releasing material, but in 2008 the label was re-launched a first time under its new name with a re-design. After stopping releasing in 2014, the label was relaunched in 2016 by Kris O' Neil.

== History ==
In 1999, the label's name was Black Hole Avanti, mainly releasing trance and techno music. Led by Tiësto, the label signed artists like Yahel, Vincenzo, or his friend DJ Montana among others. They stopped releasing music in 2002.

In 2008, after Tiësto departed from Black Hole Recordings, the label changed its name to Avanti, focusing on Progressive House and Trance, but slowly shifting into electro house. The label signed artists like Zoo Brazil, Beltek, Phunk Investigation, Jonas Steur, Robbie Rivera and DJ Ton T.B. among others. The label released music until 2014, where it marked its second stop.

Late 2016, Trance producer Kris O' Neil relaunched the label once more. The sound came back to its Progressive House and Trance roots, signing artists like Matt Fax and Luke Chable.

== Catalog ==
=== List of releases ===
==== Albums ====
- AVANTI DA 001 Various Artists - Avanti: Best of Part 1
- AVANTI DA 002 Various Artists - Avanti: Best of Part 2

==== Singles ====
No.	Artist	Title	Date
AVANTI 401-5	Yahel & DJ Miss T	Skywalker / Going Up	12/28/1999
AVANTI 402-5	DJ Vincenzo	Synsation / Eternity	01/12/2000
AVANTI 403-5	DJ Vincenzo	Galaxy 52 / Planet Zork	02/08/2000
AVANTI 404-5	Yahel	Open Your Mind / Going Up	04/28/2000
AVANTI 405-5	Various Artists	Space Age Inventions 3.0	12/28/2000
AVANTI 406-5	DJ Vincenzo	Zong Axels	04/09/2000
AVANTI 407-5	Project 247	Them / Ramper Stamper / Concrete Groove	05/20/2001
AVANTI 408-5	DJ Montana	The Bridge In The Park	06/10/2001
AVANTI 409-5	DJ Vincenzo	The Groove / The Shaker / Neuro Waves	07/12/2001
AVANTI 410-5	Salez	Soundworks 1	08/28/2001
AVANTI 411-5	Salez	Soundworks 2	09/16/2001
AVANTI 412-5	Project 247	Crasher / Countdown / Groundzero	10/06/2001
AVANTI 413-5	DJ Montana	Jazzmin / Verbero / Rudiments	11/01/2001
AVANTI 414-5	Scott Mac vs. U.X.B.	Profile / Swell	12/28/2001
Label discontinued in 2001 and re-launched in 2008.
AVANTI 415-0	Occasional	Playtime	02/27/2008
AVANTI 416-0	Soliquid	Maybe You	07/24/2008
AVANTI 417-0	Zoo Brazil	Crossroads / Nickers	07/28/2008
AVANTI 418-0	dPen	After That Day / Yesterday Morning	08/27/2008
AVANTI 419-0	OneWorld	Isla Blanca / Lingus	09/03/2008
AVANTI 420-0	Arney S	A New Beginning / The Girl From Riga	09/16/2008
AVANTI 421-0	Beltek	Kenta	10/14/2008
AVANTI 422-0	Kimito Lopez	Arabian Queen	11/14/2008
AVANTI 423-0	Simadith Project	Dirty Volum	11/20/2008
AVANTI 424-0	Moonbeam	Angel / Lacula	02/16/2009
AVANTI 425-0	Kid Massive	Let Yourself	04/06/2009
AVANTI 426-0	Dean Newton	Amnesia	05/04/2009
AVANTI 427-0	Moonbeam	All For A Dance	07/13/2009
AVANTI 428-0	Kevin Andrews	Studio Workz / Driffter	07/06/2009
AVANTI 429-0	Kid Massive	4K	06/08/2009
AVANTI 430-0	Jordy Lishious	Boiler	08/17/2009
AVANTI 431-0	Phunk Investigation	Shuri Shuri	10/27/2009
AVANTI 432-0	Steur Bros.	Save Me	11/23/2009
AVANTI 433-0	Beltek	Running Backwards	12/07/2009
AVANTI 434-0	Phunk Investigation	Have Natural	12/21/2009
AVANTI 435-0	Phunk Investigation vs. Paul Ursin & Benny Benew	Tutan	01/25/2010
AVANTI 436-0	Swen Weber	Xonque	02/01/2010
AVANTI 437-0	OneWorld	Green Bay	02/08/2010
AVANTI 438-0	Jonas Steur	Fever	04/05/2010
AVANTI 439-0	Simon Steur	Feelin' You / What I Am	04/19/2010
AVANTI 440-0	Occasional	Strive	05/24/2010
AVANTI 441-0	Venaccio	Twilight	05/31/2010
AVANTI 442-0	Re-Zone	Brainstorm	07/05/2010
AVANTI 443-0	Dean Newton	Kuraitani	09/13/2010
AVANTI 444-0	Rosie Romero	Guru	07/19/2010
AVANTI 445-0	Kid Massive & John Puzzle	Makarska	10/11/2010
AVANTI 446-0	Slava Flash	How Dull	08/09/2010
AVANTI 447-0	Patric La Funk	Calisto	08/02/2010
AVANTI 448-0	Chris Domingo	Analogous	09/20/2010
AVANTI 449-0	Dean Newton	The Fourth Floor	10/25/2010
AVANTI 450-0	Ton T.B.	Moscow Nights	10/18/2010
AVANTI 451-0	Simon Steur	The Conjurer	10/04/2010
AVANTI 452-0	Ali Wilson & Tristan Ingram	African Chant	10/11/2010
AVANTI 453-0	Craving	Never Alone	11/08/2010
AVANTI 454-0	Onid & Fano	Pulsating 3 AM	11/01/2010
AVANTI 455-0	Re-Zone	House Of Brass	11/15/2010
AVANTI 456-0	Rosie Romero & Kyfu	Afro Drum	11/22/2010
AVANTI 457-0	The Scumfrog	All Go Down	03/21/2011
AVANTI 458-0	Slava Flash	Falling 2011	01/10/2011
AVANTI 459-0	2Special	Balalaika	01/31/2011
AVANTI 460-0	Ton T.B.	Seduce Me	12/06/2010
AVANTI 461-0	Brainless	Stoemp	02/07/2011
AVANTI 462-0	Dean Newton	Interstate	03/14/2011
AVANTI 463-0	Roel Salemink	Blacktrain	02/21/2011
AVANTI 464-0	Save The Robot	Big Ben	02/28/2011
AVANTI 465-0	Save The Robot	Red City	05/09/2011
AVANTI 466-0	Re-Zone & Zmey	One Love, One Life, One Fate	05/16/2011
AVANTI 467-0	Rosie Romero & Kyfu	Pegasus	04/04/2011
AVANTI 468-0	Rosie Romero & Kyfu	Sangba	06/06/2011
AVANTI 469-0	Rosie Romero & Kyfu	Black Magic	07/18/2011
AVANTI 470-0	Re-Zone	Placebo	09/19/2011
AVANTI 471-0	Aerofeel5	Vong	10/03/2011
AVANTI 472-0	Tagir Sultanov & Sunny	Legenda	09/12/2011
AVANTI 473-0	Dean Newton & Huggy	Night & Day	09/26/2011
AVANTI 474-0	Jess-E	Flatliners	11/07/2011
AVANTI 475-0	Re-Zone & Damasko	Fine Day	11/28/2011
AVANTI 476-0	Serhio Vegas	Dolce Cubana	11/14/2011
AVANTI 477-0	Richard van Dongen	Watching You	12/19/2011
AVANTI 478-0	Mell Tierra	Eagle Beach	02/20/2012
AVANTI 479-0	Re-Zone, Sasha Ico, M Clis	Paradise Harbour	04/16/2012
AVANTI 480-0	Paul Veth	Dali's Groove	03/05/2012
AVANTI 481-0	Rosie Romero & Ben Malone	Back Up Again	02/20/2012
AVANTI 482-0	Yura Moonlight	Predator	03/12/2012
AVANTI 483-0	Dragon & Jontron	Sriracha	03/19/2012
AVANTI 484-0	Masstek & Marsbeing	Look Like That	03/26/2012
AVANTI 485-0	Simon Steur	Upside Down	04/02/2012
AVANTI 486-0	T. Airfield	More	05/28/2012
AVANTI 487-0	Tommy Walker	How We Roll	04/23/2012
AVANTI 488-0	Jorg Zimmer	Time	05/21/2012
AVANTI 489-0	Jorg Zimmer	Against The World	06/04/2012
AVANTI 490-0	Kelman & Lennon	Stereo Da Funk / Essencio	06/18/2012
AVANTI 491-0	Beauriche & Noah Furreal	Diss	06/18/2012
AVANTI 492-0	Jacob M & Damasko	Sweet Sorrow	07/16/2012
AVANTI 493-0	Savee feat. Razzy	Insanity	07/30/2012
AVANTI 494-0	J-Soul & Re-Zone	Shizzy Disko	09/17/2012
AVANTI 495-0	T. Airfield	The Answer	09/24/2012
AVANTI 496-0	Beauriche	Riviera	09/10/2012
AVANTI 497-0	Thomas Mengel	Heliconia	10/22/2012
AVANTI 498-0	Paul Veth	Rising	10/08/2012
AVANTI 499-0			
AVANTI 500-0	Asi Givati	Massive	11/12/2012
AVANTI 501-0	Luvdeluxe	Blondes vs. Brunettes	11/26/2012
AVANTI 502-0			
AVANTI 503-0	Danjo & Damian William	Lady Grey	11/19/2012
AVANTI 504-0	Hotlife	Take Me Away EP	12/03/2012
AVANTI 505-0	Ido	Voice Of Reason EP	12/10/2012
AVANTI 506-0	Simon Lee & Alvin	Count The Stars	12/24/2012
AVANTI 507-0	Beauriche & Noah Furreal	Sweat	12/17/2012
AVANTI 508-0	Spix	The New Generation	12/31/2012
AVANTI 509-0	Jessy	Give Me Love	02/11/2013
AVANTI 510-0	Jesse Voorn vs. Strobe	Go	02/18/2013
AVANTI 511-0	Lush & Simon vs. Reebs	Let Me Drop	03/18/2013
AVANTI 512-0	Andy Leka	Otter	04/22/2013
AVANTI 513-0	Jess & Miss	High Heels	06/10/2013
AVANTI 514-0			
AVANTI 515-0	Andy Leka	Tonik	06/24/2013
AVANTI 516-0	Nick Coulson	Tremolo EP	06/17/2013
AVANTI 517-0	Kev Wright	So Nice	07/08/2013
AVANTI 518-0	Tommy Walker	Bazooka	07/15/2013
AVANTI 519-0	Thomas Mengel	Breaking Bad	07/22/2013
AVANTI 520-0	Hotlife	Between These Walls EP	08/05/2013
AVANTI 521-0	Mantrastic	Kongor	10/07/2013
AVANTI 522-0	Biggi	College Girls Gone Wild	09/09/2013
AVANTI 523-0	K.S.Y.	Happy People EP	12/16/2013
AVANTI 524-0	Thomas Feelman	Speech	11/18/2013
AVANTI 525-0	K.S.Y.	Olympic Flame XIV	02/17/2014
AVANTI 526-0	CiRRO	Tonic	04/14/2014
AVANTI 527-0	Rezone	Now Check This Out	06/23/2014
AVANTI 528-0	CiRRO	Tamriel	08/18/2014
AVANTI 529-0	Andy Leka	Galaxy EP	10/06/2014
AVANTI 530-0	Robbie Rivera & Ana Criado	The Sound of the Times (Robbie Rivera House Mix)	11/03/2014

== See also ==
List of electronic music record labels
