= Mix-Roman =

Roman Mogutnov
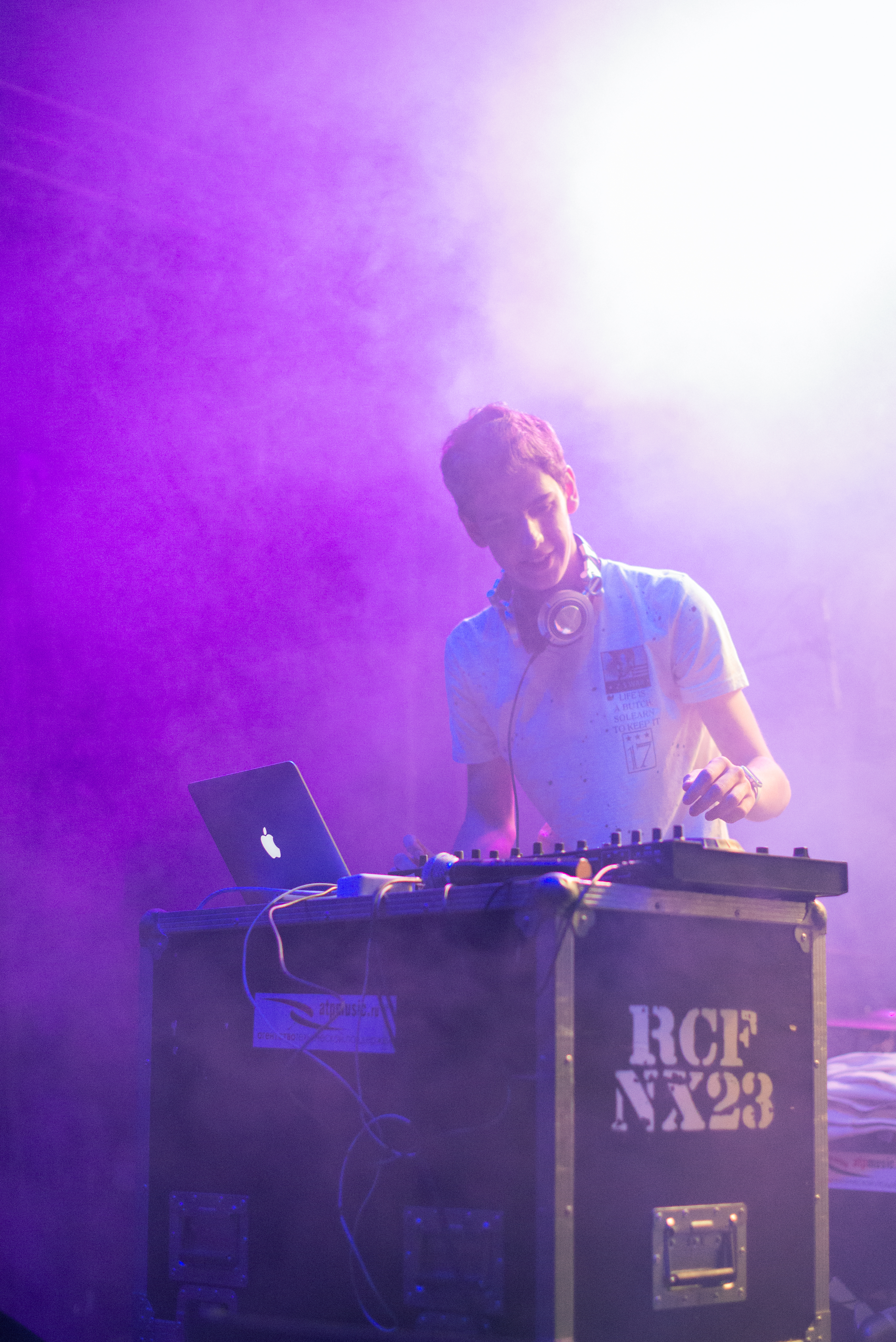
- Mix-Roman on BM Summer Fest 2016

Background information
- Birth name: Roman Mogutnov
- Also known as: DJ Roman, Roman Mix
- Born: 6 February 1997 (age 28); Almaty, Kazakhstan
- Origin: Moscow, Russia
- Genres: Trance, Big Room Trance, Progressive trance, House, Progressive house, Electro house, Big room house
- Occupation(s): DJ, Record producer, Remixer, Radio host
- Years active: 2008–present
- Labels: Alveda Music, Spinnin' Records, Global Music, M.R.S., Magik Muzik, B-Sonic, Tesseract Music Group, Electric Touch, DistroKid
- Website: Official website

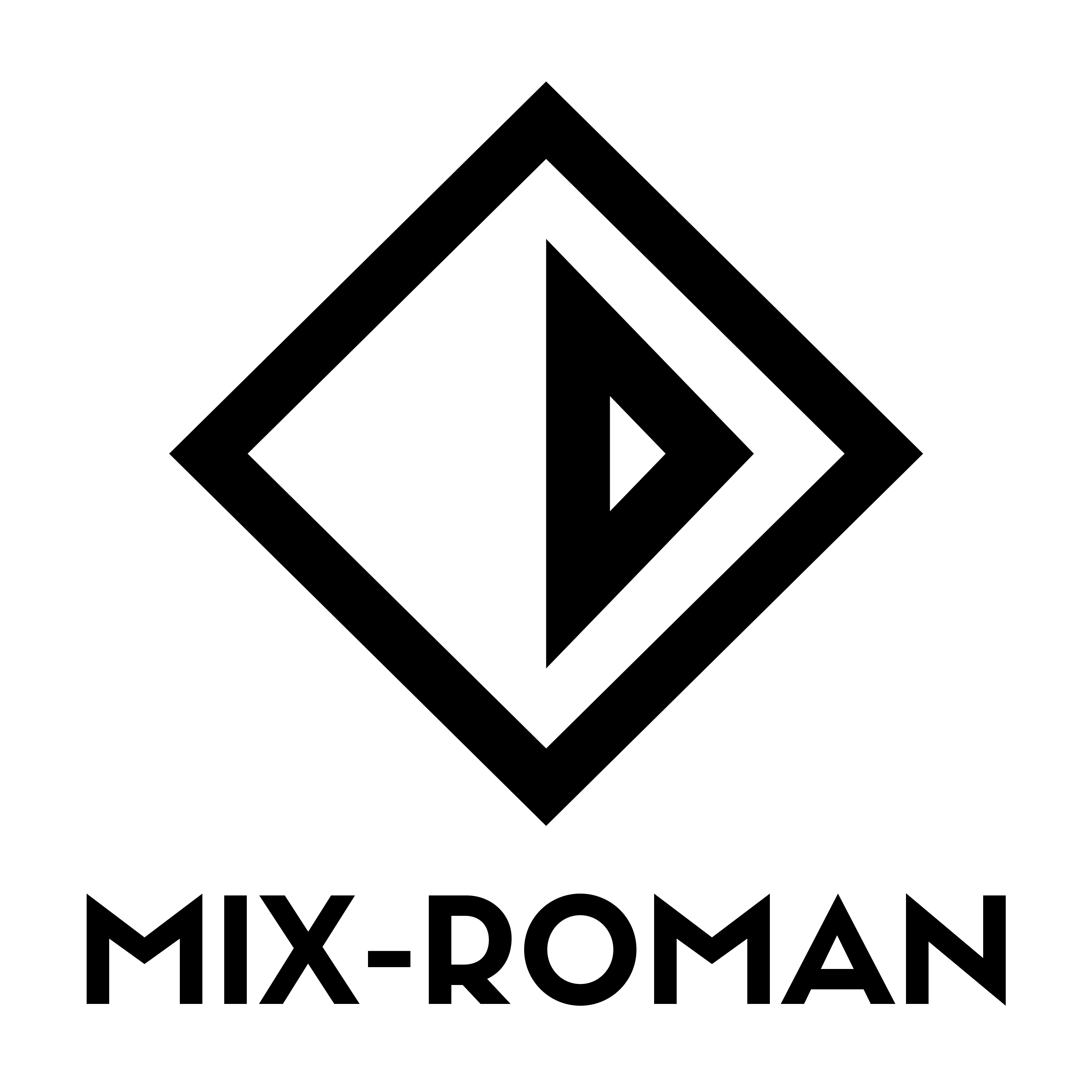
Mix-Roman wordmark, 2018–

Roman Mogutnov (Russian: Рома́н Могутно́в, IPA: [ˈrəʊ.mən məʊ.gutnəʊ.f]; born 6 February 1997 in Almaty), mostly known by his stage name Mix-Roman, is a Russian trance, House, DJ, record producer and radio host. He hosts a radio show called 'Digital Sound'. He has releases on several record labels such as Alveda Music, Magik Muzik, Spinnin' Records, and B-Sonic. He has gained popularity over the years and received support from artists including Bobina, DJ Feel, Mike Foyle, Omnia and many others. Mix-Roman played at one stage with Armin van Buuren, Tenishia, Alexander Popov, MaRLo.

== Accomplishments ==
- 2009 Mix-Roman's single “The Top” was first in Russian Top 40 on Energy FM
- 2010 Mix-Roman's single “Photon” was first in Kazakhstan Top 10 Energy FM
- 2014 Mix-Roman's single “Let's Move” was first in Kazakhstan Top 10 Energy FM
- 2015 Mix-Roman's single “Playground (Part I)” was 8th in Russia Top 100 DFM

== Discography ==
=== Albums ===
- 2011 Autumn XL Remixes
- 2012 Autumn XL Remixes Vol.2
- 2013 Sentimental Sound
- 2014 Let's Move
- 2016 Playground (Part I)

=== Singles/EPs ===
- 2008 'The Top' (with Dj Viduta) (CD-R)
- 2010 'Back Again' (T-live)
- 2010 'Regeneration' (CD-R)
- 2011 'Trance Sensation' (CD-R)
- 2012 'Sentimental Sound' (M.R.S.)
- 2012 'Photon' (CD-R)
- 2013 'Breakaway' (with Chloe Davis) (T-Live)
- 2013 'Diamond Rain' (with Dj Vengeance) (B-Sonic)
- 2014 'Let's Move' (with Jason Drake) (M.R.S.)
- 2015 'Winter' (Global Music)
- 2015 'Welcome To Amsterdam' (Global Music)
- 2015 'Instant' (Global Music)
- 2015 'Without You' (with Anastasia Grinina) (M.R.S.)
- 2015 'Playground (Part I)' (M.R.S.)
- 2015 'Try' (Tesseract Music Group)
- 2016 'Rave' (Spinnin' Records)
- 2016 'Captain Sever' (Electric Touch)
- 2016 'Pallaroid' (Tesseract Music Group)
- 2017 'Tremor (Spinnin' Records)
- 2017 'Let's Move' (Tesseract Premium)
- 2017 '28' (Alveda Liquid)

=== Remixes ===
- 2009 Far East Movement - Like A G 6 [T-Live]
- 2010 Bobina Ft. [Винтаж] - "На На На" (Mix-Roman Remix) [Diamond]
- 2010 Kesha - "Tik Tok" (Mix-Roman Summer Edit) [CD-R]
- 2014 Armin van Buuren Ft. Christian Burns - "This Light Between Us" (Mix-roman Intro Mix) [Magik Music]
- 2014 Gaia - "Tuvan" (Mix-roman Remix) [Armind]
- 2014 Calvin Harris Ft. Example - "We'll Be Coming Back" (Mix-Roman Remix) [M.R.S.]
- 2015 Steve Aoki Ft. Luke Steele - "Neon Future" (Mix-Roman Edit) [CD-R]
- 2015 The Chainsmokers Ft. SirenXX - Kanye (Mix-Roman Remix) [M.R.S.]
- 2016 Mike Candys Ft. Clyde Taylor - "Make It Home" (Mix-Roman Remix) [Electric Touch], [S2 Records]
- 2016 The Chainsmokers Ft. [ROZES] - "Roses" (Mix-Roman Remix) [Electric Touch]
- 2016 Sam Feldt Ft. Wulf - "Summer on You" (Mix-Roman Remix) [Spinnin' Records]
- 2017 Solovey - "Madrid" (Mix-Roman Remix) [Tesseract Premium]
- 2017 Coldplay - "A Sky Full Of Stars" (Mix-Roman Remix) [FFRR]
- 2018 Fram! - "Limits" (Mix-Roman Remix) [Alveda Liquid]

=== DJ Mixes ===
- 2015 "Insane Spring"
- 2016 "Beautiful World"
