= Phynn =

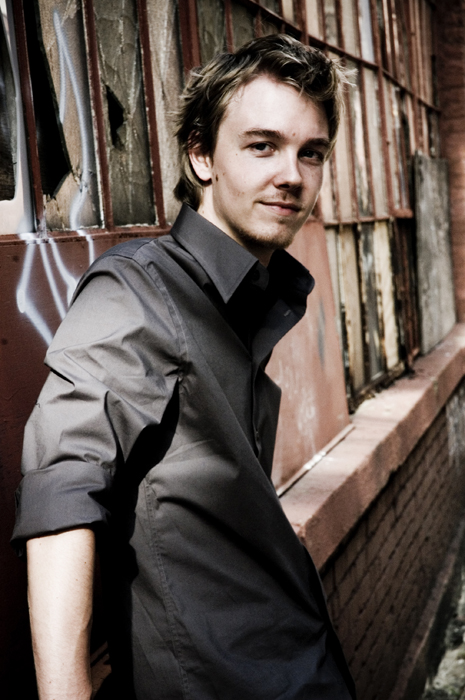

Background information
- Born: Finne Jager; 6 December 1984 (age 41); Nieuwegein, Netherlands
- Genres: Techno, Trance
- Occupations: DJ, Producer, Remixer
- Years active: 2000–present
- Labels: Lunary Records, Black Hole Recordings, Armada Music, Coldharbour Recordings, Spinnin' Records
- Website: https://www.phynn.com, https://www.twitter.com/phynn

Finne Jager (Dutch pronunciation: [ˈfɪnə ˈjaːɣər]; born 6 December 1984), commonly known as Phynn, is a Dutch trance and techno DJ and producer. He is the founder of the American electronic dance music label Lunary Records.

== Career ==
=== Early Stages ===
In 2000, Finne discovered his love for electronic dance music. Finding the style extremely interesting, he started exploring the possibilities of making electronic dance music. He first gained notoriety in an Ernesto vs. Bastian remix contest under the 'Mind Markers' guise. Out of hundreds of contestants, Finne was one of the three winners in the competition. He got in touch with Ernesto vs. Bastian and Sony's FTM label and did further remix work for the duo, remixing hits such as Stop 9.5 and Who's The Starter.

Phynn's 'Stop 9.5' remix was picked up by Tiësto, who played it on his second Tiesto In Concert edition, and featured it on the official DVD release.

In the second half of 2004, Finne (now commonly known as Phynn) decided to make a record with his friend Bart Van Wissen, known as Fictivision. The result was 'Escape' (released on DJ Tiësto's Black Hole Recordings), a track that introduced both Phynn and Fictivision onto the international trance map. Soon after that, Phynn followed up with an even bigger hit, this time a solo production, titled 'Lucid'. As of today it remains one of his biggest and most well known records. Lucid was heavily supported by Tiësto and was featured on the Tiesto in Concert DVD series as well.

=== Breakthrough ===
Finne was introduced to the 'big audience' as a closing act for Tiësto at the Heineken Music Hall in Amsterdam, on December 3, 2005, in front of an audience of over 5000 people. One month later, Phynn was declared 'Future Hero' by Mixmag, a well known electronic dance music magazine.

Following his global success, Black Hole Recordings asked Phynn to mix the 11th edition of the highly acclaimed In Trance We Trust series. Phynn accepted the offer and followed in the footsteps of legendary trance artists such as Johan Gielen, Cor Fijneman and Mark Norman and delivered the 11th edition of the series.

=== Trance Energy ===
In March 2007, Phynn reached a milestone in his career when he was asked to perform at the Main Stage of the world's biggest annual trance event Trance Energy, organized by Dutch event company ID&T. The audience size at Trance Energy 2007 counted over 25,000 people. At the age of 22, Phynn was the youngest DJ ever to perform at the Main Stage of Trance Energy. In 2008, Phynn performed at Trance Energy again at the 'Future Stage'.

=== 'Metamorphosis' Album ===
Phynn released his debut artist album in November 2008 on Black Hole Recordings. Titled 'Metamorphosis', the album featured 12 original works, including tracks with vocalists Molly Bancroft and Tiff Lacey. Notable tracks from the album are 'Try Again feat, Tiff Lacey', 'Wait For A Moment feat. Molly Bancroft', 'C U Smile', 'Starfire At Night', 'Metamorphosis' and 'No More Mistakes feat Molly Bancroft'.

=== 'Spacewalk' and 'Hello Love' ===
In 2009, Phynn released 'Spacewalk' on Black Hole Recordings. The song was an instant success, and top DJ's like Markus Schulz played the record for many months after its initial release, and it was placed on many compilations worldwide. Following up on 'Spacewalk', Phynn's next project was 'Hello Love' featuring Antonia from Jets Overhead. Just like 'Spacewalk', 'Hello Love' was a big hit with fans around the world, leading Ferry Corsten to include it on his Once Upon A Night mixed compilation.

=== Remixing for Coldharbour Recordings ===
As a result of the success of 'Spacewalk' and 'Hello Love', world-famous DJ Markus Schulz approached Phynn in 2010 to do remixes for Coldharbour Recordings. Phynn's remixes for Coldharbour Recordings became a huge success. Phynn composed and produced remixes for 'Mike Foyle pres. Statica - Deadly Nightshade', 'Rex Mundi - Opera of Northern Ocean', 'Hammer & Bennet - Language' and 'Markus Schulz - Rain'. As a result of the success of these high-profile remixes, Phynn became in high demand by record labels such as Perfecto Records, Black Hole Recordings and Euphonic Records for remixes.

=== Lunary Records ===
In mid-2013, Phynn launched his own record label Lunary Records, headquartered in the United States of America. Lunary Records focuses mainly on Techno music, but also releases other electronic music genres.

=== Departure from Trance ===
In June 2014, Phynn announced on his Facebook page that he will no longer be making Trance music, and that he is taking a new musical direction and will focus on Techno going forward.

== Discography ==
=== Albums ===
- 2008 Metamorphosis

=== Singles ===
- 2004 Escape
- 2004 Exotica / High Tide
- 2005 Lucid / Solitude
- 2005 Close Encounter
- 2005 Tempest
- 2006 Treasure Island
- 2006 Oslo Summerparade Theme
- 2007 C U Smile
- 2007 This Is The Time
- 2008 Starfire At Night
- 2008 Try Again
- 2009 Spacewalk
- 2010 The Halo Effect
- 2010 Hello Love
- 2010 Supernova
- 2012 In Your Heart / Torque
- 2014 Galaxy
- 2014 Quantum

=== Remixes ===
- 2003 Sound De-Zign – Happiness
- 2003 Simon Patterson - Andantino (with Edwin K.)
- 2003 Lique - Angel
- 2003 Ernesto vs. Bastian - Who's The Starter
- 2004 Varian - Passion
- 2004 Ernesto vs. Bastian - Stop 9.5
- 2004 Lightscape - Inner Warmth
- 2004 UKNY Connection - Amsterdam
- 2004 Fictivision - Out Of Orbit
- 2004 4 Rising Stars - Feelin' Me
- 2005 Tiësto - Adagio For Strings
- 2006 Javier & Finjemaen - Sweet Talk
- 2006 DJ Ruby - Modulation Error
- 2006 Edwin K - Encante
- 2007 Jes Brieden - Ghost
- 2008 Andy Duguid ft. Leah - Don't Belong
- 2009 Lee Canning - The Universe
- 2009 Claudia Cazacu - Earproof
- 2010 Mike Foyle - Deadly Nightshade
- 2010 Richard Durand - Dryland
- 2010 Rex Mundi - Opera of Northern Ocean
- 2010 Adiva - Desired Love
- 2010 Hammer & Bennett - Language
- 2010 Markus Schulz - Rain
- 2010 Hans Zimmer - Time
- 2011 Space Rockerz - Jet Packin'
- 2011 Ronski Speed & Lifted Emotion - Voom
- 2012 Wellenrausch - Million Miles To Run
- 2012 Robert Vadney - Pop Star
