= Avanti Kingdom =

Avanti Kingdom may refer to:

- Avanti (region), region and kingdom in ancient India
- Avanti kingdom (Mahabharata), kingdom in the ancient Indian epic Mahabharata based on the above

== See also ==
- Avanti (disambiguation)
- Kingdom of Malwa (disambiguation)
