= Avantika =

Avantika most commonly refers to:

- Ujjain, formerly known as Avantika, Indian city and former capital of Avanti
- Avanti (region), an ancient Indian republic

Avantika may also refer to:

== People ==
- Avanthika Mohan, Indian actress
- Avantika Bawa (born 1973), Indian-American artist
- Avantika Hundal, Indian television actress
- Avantika Khattri (born 1989), Indian actress
- Avantika Mishra, Indian actress
- Avantika Shetty, Indian actress
- Avantika Vandanapu (born 2005), American actress, also known mononymously as Avantika

== Ujjain, India ==
- Avantika Superfast Express, Indian railway
- Avantika University, a private university based in Ujjain, India

== Other ==
- Avantika (character), character from the Baahubali franchise
- Avantika Ahuja, character in Kurbaan (2009 film)
- Avantika (TV series), Indian TV series from 2002 to 2005

== See also ==
- Avanti (disambiguation)
