= Isochronic tones =

Regular beats of a single tone

Isochronic tones

Isochronic tones are regular beats of a single tone that are used alongside monaural beats and binaural beats in the process called brainwave entrainment (synchronization of brainwaves). At its simplest level, an isochronic tone is a tone that is being turned on and off rapidly. The sounds are played in both ears. They create sharp, distinctive pulses of sound.

Isochronic tones are tones of any frequency that recur at regular intervals, usually rapid. Isochronic tones can quantitatively be distinguished by both the frequency or pitch of the tone itself, and by the interval or frequency of repetition of the tone.

Listening to isochronic tones is a technique often employed for the practice of brainwave entrainment and there is some research related to the claims of health benefits by listening to isochronic tones.

A form of auditory beats stimulation that uses alternating tones may be considered a derivative of isochronic tones; alternatively, isochronic tones can be considered, along with monaural beats and binaural beats, to be a subtype of auditory beats stimulation.

== See also ==
- Audio–visual entrainment
- Hemi-Sync
- Trance
