= Tech trance =

Subgenre of trance music

- Stylistic origins: Techno; trance; hard trance; psychedelic music
- Cultural origins: Late 1990s, Europe
- Typical instruments: Synthesizer, drum machine, sequencer, sampler
- Derivative forms: electro trance; big room trance; psy-tech trance; peak time techno

Tech trance, is a subgenre within electronic dance music that draws upon the techno and trance genres as the name suggests.

== History ==
Tech trance was pioneered by Oliver Lieb among others in the late 1990s. Tech trance evolved in a new direction during the early 2000s. By 2006, the most widespread variant of trance was the still growing and evolving genre of tech trance, pioneered by the likes of producers such as Bryan Kearney, Marco V, Tempo Giusto and Mark Sherry.

== Style ==
Defining features of tech trance are complex, electronic rhythms, heavily quantised and usually driven by a loud kick drum, with filtered, dirty or slightly distorted hi-hat sounds and claps; harder synth sounds, usually with a large amount of resonance or delay; minimal pads, often with sidechaining to increase the volume of the beat. While earlier variants of trance often featured piano, strings or acoustic guitar, tech trance almost exclusively features synthesized sound, though electric guitar sounds occasionally feature.
