= Audio-visual entrainment =

Audio-visual entrainment (AVE), a subset of brainwave entrainment, uses flashes of lights and pulses of tones to guide the brain into various states of brainwave activity. AVE devices are often termed light and sound machines or mind machines. Altering brainwave activity is believed to aid in the treatment of psychological and physiological disorders.

== Introduction ==
All of our senses (except smell) access the brain's cerebral cortex via the thalamus, and because the thalamus is highly innervated with the cortex, sensory stimulation can easily influence cortical activity. In order to affect brain (neuronal) activity, sensory stimulation must be within the frequency range of roughly 0.5 to 25 hertz (Hz). Touch, photic and auditory stimulation are capable of affecting brain wave activity. A large area of skin must be stimulated to affect brainwaves, which leaves both auditory and photic stimulation as the most effective and easiest means of affecting brain activity. Therefore, mind machines are typically in the form of light and sound devices.

Auditory or visual stimulation (AVS) can take a variety of forms, generating different subjective and clinical effects. The simplest form of stimulation is to present a series of random light flashes and/or sound pulses to a subject, such as from watching TV or cars drive by, and investigate the resulting subjective experiences or electroencephalography (EEG) effects. AVE, however, involves organized, repetitive stimulation at a particular frequency for a specific period of time, and the frequency of stimulation is reflected within the EEG. This is called "open loop" stimulation, or free-running entrainment, and is not contingent on monitoring brainwaves in any way. "Close loop" AVE would involve visual and auditory stimulation in response to one's EEG.

== Effects ==
AVE effects on the EEG are found primarily over the sensory-motor strip, frontally, and in the parietal lobe (somatosensory) regions and slightly less within the prefrontal cortex.

It is within these areas where motor activation, attention, executive function, and somatosensory (body) awareness is primarily mediated. Auditory entrainment (AE) is the same concept as visual entrainment, with the exception that auditory signals are passed from the cochlea of the ears into the thalamus via the medial geniculate nucleus, whereas visual entrainment passes from the retina into the thalamus via the lateral geniculate nucleus. Eyes-closed AVE at 18.5 Hz has been shown to increase EEG brainwave activity by 49% at the vertex. At the vertex (with the eyes closed) AE has been shown to increase EEG brainwave activity by 21%. Successful entrainment leads to a meditative, peaceful kind of dissociation, where the individual experiences a loss of somatic and cognitive awareness. However, it is possible for visual entrainment to trigger seizures.

=== Evidence of sensory effects ===
Huxley and Walter were among the first to articulate the subjective correlates of photic stimulation. They described subjective experiences of incessantly changing patterns, whose color was a function of the rate of flashing. Between ten and fifteen flashes per second, Walter reported orange and red; above fifteen, green and blue; above eighteen, white and grey. Huxley also described enriched and intensified experiences when subjects were under the effects of mescaline or lysergic acid. In his view, the rhythms of the lamp interacted with the rhythms of the brain's electrical activity to produce a complex interference pattern, which is translated by the brain's perceptual circuits into a conscious pattern of color and movement. Glicksohn also reported on altered states of consciousness from photic driving and its relationship of self-perceived creativity.

== Research ==
A review of 20 studies on brainwave entrainment found that it is effective in improving cognition and behavioral problems, and alleviating stress and pain.

The results of a study on children with attention-deficit disorder found that AVE was more effective than neurofeedback for treating ADD symptoms.

A migraine headache study involving seven patients with migraine found that AVE sessions reduced migraine duration from a pretreatment average of six hours to a posttreatment average of 35 minutes. Measuring 50 of the participants' migraines, 49 migraines decreased in severity and 36 were stopped when using AVE.

Another clinical study showed declines in depression, anxiety and suicidal ideation following a treatment program using AVE. A study by Berg and Siever used audio-visual entrainment devices on women with seasonal affective disorder. Both depression and anxiety symptoms were reduced in participants, as compared to a placebo phase. Participants also reported improvements in their social lives, with increased happiness and sociability, decreased appetite, increased energy and weight loss. A study by Cantor and Stevens found significant decreases in depression scores in participants after four weeks of using AVE.

A study by Thomas and Siever showed that many people with chronic temporomandibular joint disorder (TMD) brace up when asked to relax. AVE at 10 Hz produced deep masseter muscle relaxation and finger warming within six minutes. Audio entrainment has shown promise as a singular therapeutic modality for treating jaw tension and TMD pain. AVE has been used to reduce jaw pain, patient anxiety and heart rate during dental procedures.
