= Misja Helsloot =

Dutch Trance and Progressive DJ (born 1973)

- Born: Misja Helsloot; 21 January 1973 (age 53); Rotterdam, Netherlands
- Genres: Trance
- Occupations: Disc jockey; remixer; record producer
- Instruments: Synthesizer; turntables
- Years active: 1992–present

Misja Helsloot (Dutch pronunciation: [ˈmɪɕaː ˈɦɛlsloːt]; born 21 January 1973 in Rotterdam) is a Dutch Trance and Progressive DJ.

== Career ==
In 1992, Helsloot, at the age of nineteen, started to purchase albums and organize his own parties. Mixing music with a friend, Misja worked hard for six years until he became friends with DJ Tiësto in 1998. Tiësto allowed Misja to mix his album In Trance we Trust 001. It was later released in September of the same year to a good reception in his home country the Netherlands, and also caught on in Israel and Norway. A year after his CD was released Misja started his own record label, C4, which was a sublabel of Basic Beat Recordings of Rotterdam. Misja released his first CD on C4 titled The Creation - Day One.

In 1999 as well, Misja played at Hyperstate in Denmark, and again played the same festival in 2001 in Norway. With success getting larger in Europe he was invited to a number 10 spot on the Forbidden Paradise CD compilation. In September 2000, one month after appearing on Forbidden Paradise, The Creation - Day Two was released to the public. In August 2001, along with Roland K and Maarten v Oosten, Misja founded his own independent label, Gesture Music. Nearly a year later, under the new company the first production by Misja was released, Misja Helsloot - First Second. Other major DJs, including Paul van Dyk picked up on it and it was played and mixed throughout many clubs. Now holding a respected place on the trance circuit, after playing at Love Fields and Dance Valley in the summer of 2002 in the Netherlands, Misja travelled the world doing parties from Tel Aviv to Miami. At the same time Misja's career had taken him back to the beginning with his release of In Trance We Trust 007. In 2004 Misja opened on the main stage of Trance Energy, one of the largest trance parties in the world.

In 2006 Misja organised his very own Create events, with editions in his hometown Delft, Amsterdam and The Hague. In 2009, he put the focus on studio work and released his debut album ‘All Inclusive’– including collabs with Signum, Sied van Riel and Leon Bolier. Ten years later, his second artist album dropped on Black Hole Recordings – ‘What The Helsloot’. Featuring a collection of solo work, as well as collabs with the likes of Xijaro & Pitch, Fred Baker, Woody van Eyden, Lumin-8, AxelPolo and vocalists Natalie Gioa and Cari.

Throughout the years, Misja has had releases on labels like Aly & Fila's Future Sound of Egypt, Universal Nation, In Trance We Trust and Armada Music, earning him a stage at shows like A State of Trance, Electronic Family and Luminosity Beach Festival. In 2017, he launched an Open To Close concept – kicking off in Amsterdam's Dhoem Dhaam in 2017, followed by editions in The Hague, Prague (CZ) and Bergen (Norway).

== Hel:sløwed ==
In 2022, Misja decided to join forces with Dutch producer Michael de Kooker, with whom he started a collaborative side-project named Hel:sløwed. Since its kick-off, the Hel:sløwed project has had releases on labels like Armin van Buuren’s A State of Trance, Ferry Corsten’s Flashover Recordings, Grotesque, Spinnin’ Records and Tiësto’s AFT:HRS.

== Discography ==
=== 12 Inch ===
- Back From Your Past (First Second, 2004)
- First Second (First Second, 2004)
- A Different World (Gesture Music, 2002)
- First Second (Gesture Music, 2002)
- The Beast Within' (Basic Beat, 2001)
- E-Mocean (Black Hole, 1998)

=== Mix CDs ===
- Deep Trance (Water Records, 2004)
- Back From Your Past (Gesture Music, 2004)
- Capital (Combined Forces, 2002)
- In Trance We Trust 007 (Black Hole, 2002)
- Forbidden Paradise 11 (Basic Beat, 2001)
- Oslo Central vol. 2 (Arcade Norway, 2001)
- The Creation - Day Two (Basic Beat, 2000)
- Forbidden Paradise 10 (Basic Beat, 2000)
- The Creation - Day One (Basic Beat, 2000)
- In Trance We Trust 001 (Black Hole, 1998)

=== Albums ===
- All Inclusive (Cloud9 Dance, 2009)
- What The Helsloot (Black Hole Recordings, 2019)

=== Digital Singles ===
- 2024: Rediscover [In Trance We Trust]
- 2023: Half a Century [Grotesque Music]
- 2021: Lepidopterist [In Trance We Trust]
- 2020: Sean Dexter - Synthetica (Misja Helsloot remixes)
- 2019: Power of Love (with Xijaro and Pitch & Cari)
- 2018: See The Sun, featuring Cari [Black Hole recordings]
- 2018: Moving Souls (with Xijaro and Pitch) [Future Sound Of Egypt]
- 2016: All I Had, feat Kyle Richardson [GO recordings]
- 2015: Precious (Future Favorite on ASOT 740)
- 2013: So Little Time [EMI]
