= Avanti (magazine) =

German women's magazine

- Categories: Women's magazine
- Frequency: Weekly
- First issue: 2000
- Company: Bauer Media Group
- Country: Germany
- Based in: Hamburg
- Language: German
- Website: www.avanti-magazin.de

Avanti was a German women's weekly magazine.

== History ==
It was first published in 2000.

After Britta Mayer-Behrens left in mid-2006, Susanne Webers became the magazine's new editor-in-chief in January 2007. She was succeeded by Christian Loeffelbein-Sobek in 2016.

In the third quarter of 2006, the circulation was around 215,000 copies.
