= Mike Foyle =

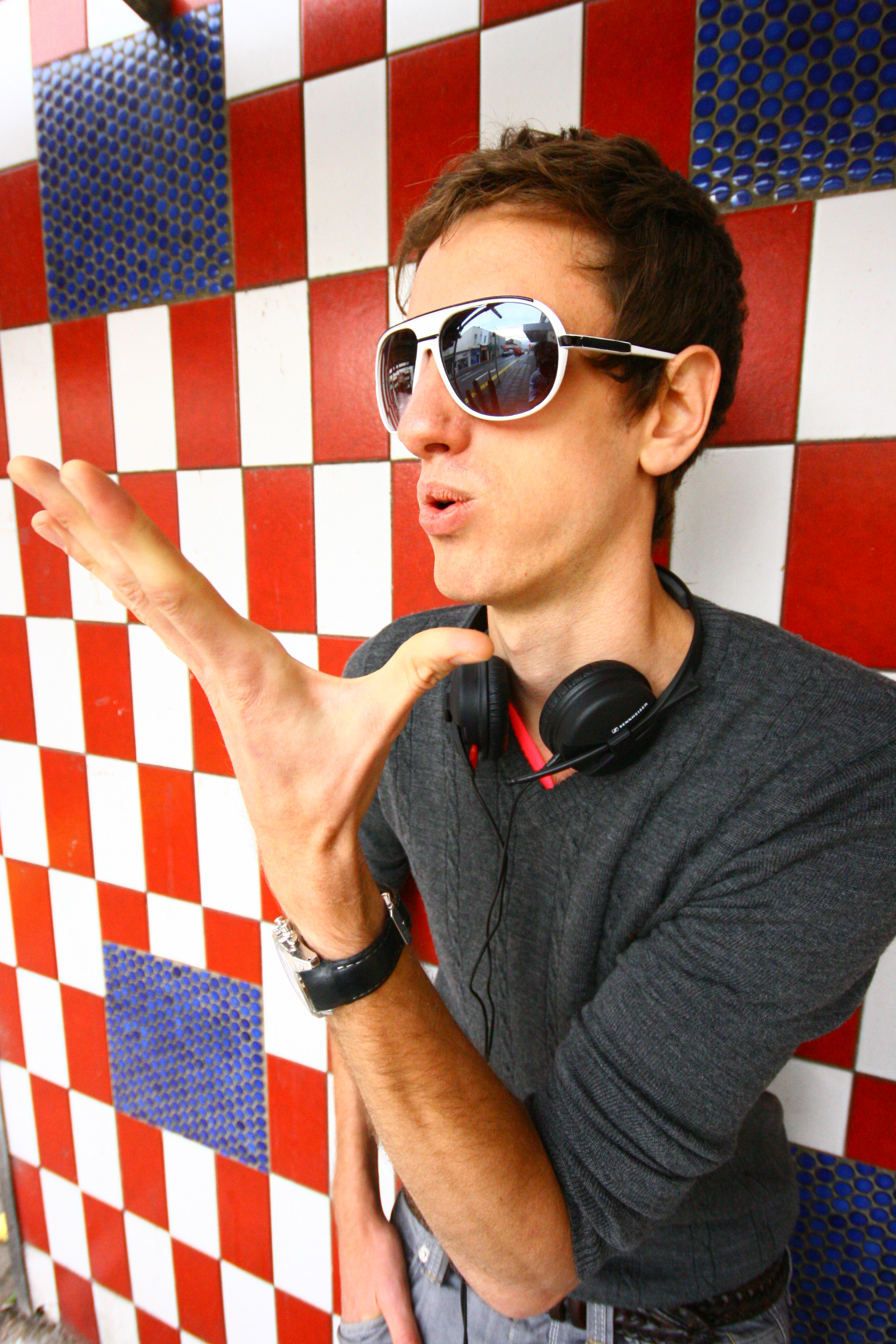

Background information
- Also known as: Statica, Bolt, Andromeda
- Born: Michael Foyle; 3 October 1985 (age 40)
- Origin: Southampton, England, United Kingdom
- Genres: Progressive house/trance
- Occupations: Music producer, DJ
- Instruments: Violin, piano, synthesizer
- Years active: 2004–present
- Label: Armada Music
- Website: mikefoyle.com

Mike Foyle (born 3 October 1985) is a British producer, composer and DJ of progressive electronic dance music.

== Background ==
Mike Foyle was born in Southampton, England in October 1985. His father is a session musician and band member playing cello, piano, bass guitar and acoustic guitar. At the age of eight, Foyle began learning to play the violin. By the age of 15 and after already leading the Southampton Youth Sinfonietta Orchestra, Foyle was appointed Concertmaster and first violinist for the Southampton Youth Concert Sinfonia Orchestra. Foyle devoted his higher education years to studying Music and graduated from De Montfort University in Leicester with a degree in Music Technology and Innovation in 2009. Preceding this he also gained a Higher National Diploma in Music Technology at Leicester College in 2006. During his final year at University, Foyle explored audio based brainwave entrainment and biofeedback combining musical textures with isochronic tones, monaural beats and binaural beats to create audio sessions which help induce sleep, gain physical motivation or aid creative inspiration.

== Career ==
Foyle's professional career as a producer and DJ began in 2005 with the release of his debut single, "Space Guitar" on Electronic Elements, a sub-label of Armada Music. Later in 2005, Foyle released "Love Theme Dusk", a collaboration featuring the trance duo 'Signalrunners'. The track received regular support on BBC Radio 1 and from Armin van Buuren, who adopted the track as one of his signature playlist features, supporting it at most of his gigs over the following six months. "Love Theme Dusk" is considered a "classic" amongst electronic dance music fans today. Foyle began performing in clubs in 2006 after winning a DJ contest held by the promoters of Vaccine, an event brand based in London, England. He was invited to play at Turnmills nightclub (which has since been closed) in Farringdon for his first official DJ gig. Since then Foyle has toured around the world to play at festivals, clubs and private events.

== Discography ==
=== Productions ===
- Mike Foyle & ReFeel "Legacy" – 2012 (Arisa Audio)
- Mike Foyle vs Leon Bolier "Placebo" – 2012 (Armada)
- Foyle & Zo "Simple Things" – 2011 (Armada)
- Mike Foyle & ReFeel "Universal Language" – 2011 (Armada)
- Mike Foyle presents Statica "Shades of Blue" – 2011 (Armada)
- Mike Foyle presents Statica "Shades of Red" – 2011 (TBC)
- Mike Foyle presents Bolt "Buff Monkey" – 2010 (Armada)
- Mike Foyle presents Bolt "Rascal" – 2010 (Armada)
- Mike Foyle & X-Vertigo "Freak" – 2010 (Sm{u}th)
- Mike Foyle & DNS Project "Cayo Norte" – 2010 (Armada)
- Mike Foyle presents Statica – "Head Rush" – 2010 (Armada)
- Mike Foyle "Silver Lake" – 2010 (Armada)
- Mike Foyle presents Statica "Blossom" – 2010 (Armada)
- Mike Foyle feat Akino Arai "Sun Down" – 2010 (Armada)
- Mike Foyle presents Statica "Deadly Nightshade" – 2010 (Armada)
- Foyle & Sparx "Chords of Life" – 2009 (Armada)
- Mike Foyle & Augustine Leudar "De Bells of Nafin" – 2009 (Armada)
- Mike Foyle "Sweet Sammy Jane" – 2009 (Armada)
- Foylee "Hot Fuzz" – 2009 (Slinky Digital)
- Jolly Roger "Skankin" – 2009 (Armada)
- Mike Foyle presents Statica – "Bittersweet Nightshade" – 2009 (Armada)
- Mike Foyle "Pandora" – 2008 (Armada)
- Mike Foyle presents Bolt "Pleasure To Your Ears" – 2008 (Flutterspark)
- Mike Foyle presents Bolt "Hex" – 2007 (Flutterspark)
- Mike Foyle presents Andromeda "Northern Lights" – 2007 (Intrenze)
- Mike Foyle "Firefly" – 2007 (Armada)
- Mike Foyle vs Sunquest "One Day" – 2006 (Impressive)
- Mike Foyle "Shipwrecked" – 2006 (Armada)
- Mike Foyle vs Filo and Peri "Luana" – 2005 (Empire State)
- Mike Foyle vs Signalrunners "Love Theme Dusk" – 2005 (Armada)
- Mike Foyle presents Statica "For Your Eyes Only" – 2005 (Armada)
- Mike Foyle presents Statica "Space Guitar" – 2005 (Armada)

=== Remixes ===
- Signum "Second Wave" – 2012 (Armada)
- Nash & Pepper "Ushuaia Memories" – 2012 (Armada)
- A.R.D.I "Eternity" – 2012 (Armada)
- Gary Afterlife "Waiting for the Sunrise" – 2012 (Abora Recordings)
- Ostrega "First Scream" – 2011 (Armada)
- Markus "City Scape" – 2011 (TBC)
- Coldplay "Paradise" – 2011 (White Label)
- Markus Schulz "Alpha State" – 2011 (Armada)
- Avernus "Sirya" – 2011 (Blue Soho)
- Three N One "Reflect" – 2010 (Armada)
- Apple One "Heart Shaped Box – 2010 (Solarswarm)
- Pedro del Mar feat Ridgewalkers "Tears of the Dragon" – 2010 (Armada)
- Nash & Pepper "Changed – 2010 (Armada)
- Nash & Pepper "Aftersun" – 2010 (Armada)
- Nash & Pepper "I Killed The Love" – 2010 (Armada)
- Nash & Pepper "Am I Wrong" – 2010 (Armada)
- Simmons & Blanc "Something About You" – 2010 (Afterglow)
- Empire of the Sun "Walking on a Dream" – 2010 (Whitelabel)
- Tim Besamusca "Sanctum" – 2009 (Amon Vsion)
- Lily Allen "The Fear" – 2009 (Whitelabel)
- Easton feat Neo "Transmitted Gift" – 2009 (Alter Ego)
- David Forbes "Foldback" – 2009 (Fraction)
- Headstrong feat Shelley Harland "Helpless" – 2008 (Sola)
- Rick Snel "New Morning" – 2008 (Captivate)
- X-Vertigo "Dark Xmas" – 2008 (White Label)
- Max Savietto "Techno code" – 2007 (Mazeman)
- Lustral "Solace" – 2006 (Lost Language)
- Vadim Soloviev "Stay With Me" – 2006 (Motion)
- Majai "Lightwave – 2006 (Monster Tunes)
- Filo & Peri "Closer Now – 2005 (Empire State)
- Santiago Nino & Francis Davila "Wake You From The Inside" – 2005 (Connected)
