= In Trance We Trust =

Dutch record label

- Parent company: Black Hole Recordings
- Founded: 1998
- Founder: Tijs Verwest; Arny Bink
- Genre: Trance; vocal trance; progressive trance
- Country of origin: Netherlands
- Official website: intrancewetrust.com

In Trance We Trust (ITWT) is a Dutch record label owned by Tijs Verwest and Arny Bink. It is a sublabel of Black Hole Recordings, established in 1998 and best known for its clubbier and a little harder side of trance music, and for its compilation of the same name.

The 4th volume in the ITWT compilation album series, mixed by Johan Gielen, spent 5 weeks in the Norwegian charts peaking at #9.

== Catalog ==
=== Albums ===
Artist Albums

- ITWT 001 ALBUM Eyal Barkan - V.I.P.
- ITWT 002 ALBUM First State - Time Frame
- ITWT 003 ALBUM Tom Cloud - A New Day
- ITWT 004 ALBUM T4L - Biogenesis
- ITWT 005 ALBUM Tom Cloud - The Sky Is The Limit

Digital Albums

- ITWT 001 DIGITAL ALBUM Impact - Immortal Vision
- ITWT 002 DIGITAL ALBUM Midway - Equator

=== Compilations ===
DJ Mixes

- ITWT 001 CD Misja Helsloot - In Trance We Trust 001
- ITWT 002 CD Stigma - In Trance We Trust 002
- ITWT 003 CD Lars Holte - In Trance We Trust 003
- ITWT 004 CD Johan Gielen - In Trance We Trust 004
- ITWT 005 CD Cor Fijneman - In Trance We Trust 005
- ITWT 006 CD Cor Fijneman - In Trance We Trust 006
- ITWT 007 CD Misja Helsloot - In Trance We Trust 007
- ITWT 008 CD Ton T.B. - In Trance We Trust 008
- ITWT 009 CD Mark Norman - In Trance We Trust 009
- ITWT 010 CD Various Artists - In Trance We Trust: Collector's Edition 1 (2 CDs: CD1 unmixed, CD2 mixed by DJ Cor Fijneman)
- ITWT 011 CD Phynn - In Trance We Trust 011
- ITWT 012 CD Johan Gielen - In Trance We Trust 012
- ITWT 013 CD Carl B - In Trance We Trust 013
- ITWT 014 CD DJ Daniel Wanrooy - In Trance We Trust 014
- ITWT 015 CD DJ Virtual Vault - In Trance We Trust 015
- ITWT 016 CD DJ Observer & Daniel Heatcliff - In Trance We Trust 016
- ITWT 017 CD Bobina - In Trance We Trust 017
- ITWT 018 CD DJ Marc Simz - In Trance We Trust 018
- ITWT 019 CD DJ Kris O'Neil - In Trance We Trust 019
- ITWT 020 CD Menno de Jong, Mike Saint-Jules & Sneijder - In Trance We Trust 020
- ITWT 021 CD Adam Ellis - In Trance We Trust 021
- ITWT 022 CD Menno de Jong - In Trance We Trust 022
- ITWT DC 01 Various Artists - In Trance We Trust: Collected Works

Xtra Nordic Edition

- ITWT 001 CDX John Storm - In Trance We Trust Xtra Nordic Edition
- ITWT 002 CDX SL - In Trance We Trust Xtra Nordic Edition 2
- ITWT 003 CDX SL - In Trance We Trust Xtra Nordic Edition 3

Australia Series

- ITWTAU001 First State & James Brooke - In Trance We Trust Australia 001
- ITWTAU002 Lange & Steve Strangis - In Trance We Trust Australia 002

=== Singles ===
(ITWT 300-5 — ITWT 320-5)
Catalog #	Artist	Title	Date
ITWT 300-5	Nunca	House of Doom	??-??-1998
ITWT 301-5	Ceres	Turn Me On Now / Ease Your Mind	02-08-1998
ITWT 302-5	San	Feel My Love / Stroke	03-08-1998
ITWT 303-5	Misja Helsloot	In Trance We Trust 001 Sampler	11-03-1998
ITWT 304-5	Misja Helsloot	In Trance We Trust 001 Sampler 2	11-03-1998
ITWT 305-5	Hidden Sound System	I Know / Freeze	01-01-1999
ITWT 306-5	Scoop	Wings of Love (The Remixes)	??-??-1999
ITWT 307-5	Various Artists	Anthems Universal	??-??-1999
ITWT 308-5	Loop Control	Exceptionally Beautiful / Reflections	09-01-1999
ITWT 309-5	El Dorado	Be Free / Iris	10-01-1999
ITWT 310-5	The Quest	C Sharp / Shaken Not Stirred / Solitude	11-01-1999
ITWT 311-5	Modus Operandi	Sandman / Promise / Suburbia	01-01-2000
ITWT 312-5	Twenty-Something	Sugar Rush / Natural / Roulade	02-01-2000
ITWT 313-5	Dawnseekers	Gothic Dream / Twister / Neural Net	03-01-2000
ITWT 314-5	Impact	Behind The Mirror / Inspiration / Just Another Story	04-01-2000
ITWT 315-5	Organza	Aloha / Solar Eclipse	05-01-2000
ITWT 316-5	Sfinx	Synthyris / Stylophorum	06-01-2000
ITWT 317-5	Various Artists	Anthems Universal 2	07-01-2000
ITWT 318-5	Twenty-Something	Morphing Mirror / Mayflower	09-01-2000
ITWT 319-5	Svenson	Clubbin' On Sunshine	09-01-2000
ITWT 320-5	Yahel & Eyal Barkan	Voyage / Liquid Paradise / I Believe	10-01-2000

(ITWT 321-5 — ITWT 340-5)
Catalog #	Artist	Title	Date
ITWT 321-5	Denzel D.	Bluster of the Storm / A Binary Star / Theme of Agony	11-01-2000
ITWT 322-5	Yahel & Eyal Barkan	Voyager (Magikal Remake)	10-01-2000
ITWT 323-5	Threesome	Mohave / Gobi	01-01-2000
ITWT 324-5	Impact	Kemistry / A Split Second / Modular Control	02-01-2001
ITWT 325-5	Dawnseekers	Protuberance / Sunstorm	04-01-2001
ITWT 326-5	Headstrong	Noise 4 Us / Escalator	06-01-2001
ITWT 327-5	Impact	Live To Go / Moment By Moment / All The Time In The World	07-01-2001
ITWT 328-5	Ralphie B.	Massive / Disclosure	09-01-2001
ITWT 329-5	Dance Nation	Sunshine	09-08-2001
ITWT 330-5	Tukan	Light A Rainbow	
ITWT 331-5	Sfinx	Conspiracy of Sound / Rising Up / Strength	10-22-2001
ITWT 332-5	King of Clubs	Revelation	11-12-2001
ITWT 333-5	Midway	Monkey Forest / Travelling	04-03-2002
ITWT 334-5	Impact	Message From Tibet / Where R U? / Sirius	05-22-2002
ITWT 335-5	Dance Nation	Dance!	06-14-2002
ITWT 336-5	Tangled Universe	Message From The Universe / Cosmic Synts	07-01-2002
ITWT 337-5	Eyal Barkan & A-Force	Revolution	08-22-2002
ITWT 338-5	Salez & Cor Fijneman	Latitude / Black Mamba	10-01-2002
ITWT 339-5	Mesh	Persuasion / Trancefixion	08-21-2002
ITWT 340-5	Impact vs. Cor Fijneman	No Way Out / El Matador	09-21-2002

(ITWT 341-5 — ITWT 360-5)
Catalog #	Artist	Title	Date
ITWT 341-5	Dance Nation	Dance! / Rise & Shine	10-21-2002
ITWT 342-5	Vector 7	Air of Love / Infected	11-21-2002
ITWT 343-5	Dance Nation	Words	12-21-2002
ITWT 344-5	Tangled Universe	Next Victim / Blind Date	01-01-2003
ITWT 345-5	Impact	Hands of Faith / Digital Voyeur	01-15-2003
ITWT 346-5	Midway	Inca / Kung Fu	01-21-2003
ITWT 347-5	Fictivision	Ringworld / Outpost	02-01-2003
ITWT 348-5	Cor Fijneman	Exhibition / The Red Bridge	03-21-2003
ITWT 349-5	Mesh	Purple Haze / Esthetic Visions	04-20-2003
ITWT 350-5	Various Artists	In Trance We Trust Special Collector's Edition 1	05-20-2003
ITWT 351-5	Eyal Barkan	V.I.P. (Album Sampler)	06-20-2003
ITWT 352-5	Cor Fijneman	Venus (Meant To Be Your Lover)	04-20-2003
ITWT 353-5	Salez	Equator / Celestial	
ITWT 354-5	Fictivision vs. C-Quence	Symbols	07-20-2003
ITWT 355-5	Photon Project	Brainwave / Thoughts	08-20-2003
ITWT 356-5	Flower Child	Captivated	06-20-2003
ITWT 357-5	Dance Nation	You Take Me Away	09-20-2003
ITWT 358-5	Tangled Universe	Rain & Thunder / Execute Mode / Hyper Threading	10-20-2003
ITWT 359-5	Midway	Amazon	03-20-2004
ITWT 360-5	Starr	Sunstroke / Digital Exposure	11-20-2003

(ITWT 361-5 — ITWT 380-5)
Catalog #	Artist	Title	Date
ITWT 361-5	Photon Project	11th Hour / Fly / Deep	12-20-2003
ITWT 362-5	Impact	The Audience Is Listening / Painted Sky	05-20-2004
ITWT 363-5	Fictivision	Out of Orbit	02-20-2004
ITWT 364-5	Cor Fijneman	Healing	04-20-2004
ITWT 365-5	Choopie & Shmuel	Sunrising	07-20-2004
ITWT 366-5	Fictivision vs. Phynn	Escape	05-20-2004
ITWT 367-5	Midway	Amazon (The Remixes)	02-20-2004
ITWT 368-5	Phynn	Exotica / Hightide	09-20-2004
ITWT 369-5	Propylon	Exile / Morning Glow	10-20-2004
ITWT 370-5	Starr	Summer Queen / Santiago	
ITWT 371-5	Vadik	Mission 7 / Fate	
ITWT 372-5	Cor Fijneman	Don't Break My Heart	12-20-2004
ITWT 373-5	Tangled Universe	I Miss You / For A Reason	06-06-2005
ITWT 374-5	Sfinx	Infinity / Vengeance / Revoluçion	08-11-2005
ITWT 375-5	Fred Baker vs. Nyram	Confirmation / Recognition	08-15-2005
ITWT 376-5	Phynn	Lucid / Solitude	09-01-2005
ITWT 377-5	T4L	Moonwalk / Perfect Blend	09-15-2005
ITWT 378-5	Mark Norman	Teardrops / T-34	10-20-2005
ITWT 379-5	First State	First State / Sacred	11-15-2005
ITWT 380-5	Ekon	Existence	05-18-2006

(ITWT 381-5 — ITWT 400-0)
Catalog #	Artist	Title	Date
ITWT 381-5	Phynn	Close Encounter / Tempest	11-28-2005
ITWT 382-5	Progression	Superstitious / Red Alert	02-20-2006
ITWT 383-5	Mesh	Aftertouch	11-29-2006
ITWT 384-5	Vadik	Earth's Breathing / Sunplay	02-27-2008
ITWT 385-5	Impact	Immortal Vision / Sands of Persia	01-23-2006
ITWT 386-5	Midway	Cobra	06-26-2006
ITWT 387-5	T4L	Maximus / Anno Domini	11-29-2006
ITWT 388-5	Ekon	Skywalker / Enchant	
ITWT 389-5	Solid Haze & MileZ	Reduxed	11-13-2006
ITWT 390-5	Impact	El Cuento De Nando / Arkestra	12-11-2006
ITWT 391-5	Cold Blue & Del Mar	Seven Ways / 11 Days	02-20-2007
ITWT 392-5	Electric Pulse	Blue Marbles / Cotton Candy	04-16-2007
ITWT 393-5	First State feat. Anita Kelsey	Falling	11-06-2007
ITWT 394-0	Odyssee	Sexy Arps / Day By Day	10-15-2007
ITWT 395-0	Tom Cloud	Million Miles Away / Surrender	08-13-2007
ITWT 396-0	Alex Kunnari	Lifter	11-27-2007
ITWT 397-0	Alex Kunnari	Lifter (The Remixes)	01-22-2008
ITWT 398-0	Tom Cloud	Vanilla Sky / Little Treasure	12-10-2007
ITWT 399-0	Myon	Albion	12-21-2007
ITWT 400-0	Purepath vs. Natlife & Amex	Clockworks	01-23-2008

(ITWT 401-0 — ITWT 420-0)
Catalog #	Artist	Title	Date
ITWT 401-0	First State	Your Own Way	03-04-2008
ITWT 402-0	Midway	Monkey Forest (Danilo Ercole Remix)	03-12-2008
ITWT 403-0	Carl B.	Deliverance	05-23-2008
ITWT 404-0	Myon	Albion (Remixed)	05-16-2008
ITWT 405-0	Midway	Amazon (Carl B. Remix)	05-07-2008
ITWT 406-0	First State	Sierra Nevada	05-19-2007
ITWT 407-0	Carl B.	Life Can Wait	06-10-2008
ITWT 408-0	Impact	El Horizonte	05-27-2008
ITWT 409-0	Carl B	Fallout	12-15-2008
ITWT 410-0	Dance Nation	Sunshine 2008	07-17-2008
ITWT 411-0	Issues	Danderlions / Sinfall	08-19-2008
ITWT 412-0	Tom Cloud	Ray of Light / Hidden Island	07-22-2008
ITWT 413-0	Virtual Vault	Request	09-09-2008
ITWT 414-0	JPL	Whenever I May Find Her / Escapism	08-14-2008
ITWT 415-0	Alex Kunnari	Unstable	08-14-2008
ITWT 416-0	Existone	The Chasm / Absolutely Free	10-07-2008
ITWT 417-0	Airbase	Denial	09-23-2008
ITWT 418-0	Carl B.	Just A Thought	09-18-2008
ITWT 419-0	Airbase	The Road Not Taken	12-08-2008
ITWT 420-0	Myon & Shane 54	Trapped	10-20-2008

(ITWT 421-0 — ITWT 440-0)
Catalog #	Artist	Title	Date
ITWT 421-0	Midway	Monkey Forest (Jonas Stenberg Remix)	10-31-2008
ITWT 422-0	Mark Sixma	Visionary	10-15-2008
ITWT 423-0	Tom Cloud	Carpe Diem / Pictures	11-14-2008
ITWT 424-0	Impact	Hypnotize / El Verano De Miami	11-27-2008
ITWT 425-0	Alex Kunnari	Breath In	12-02-2008
ITWT 426-0	First State	Off The Radar	01-05-2009
ITWT 427-0	Virtual Vault	Definition	12-29-2008
ITWT 428-0	Setrise vs. Braend	Tropical Shores	01-05-2009
ITWT 429-0	Existone	Sunshower	01-15-2009
ITWT 430-0	Eddie Sender	Wake Up	01-22-2009
ITWT 431-0	Lost Stories	False Promises	01-27-2009
ITWT 432-0	Dave Schiemann	Overload	02-04-2009
ITWT 433-0	Daniel Wanrooy	Three Bridges / Sunshine	02-16-2009
ITWT 434-0	Existone	Obscure Rays	03-02-2009
ITWT 435-0	Sander Van Dien	Aurora	03-09-2009
ITWT 436-0	Carl B.	On Short Notice	03-16-2009
ITWT 437-0	Virtual Vault	Experience	04-06-2009
ITWT 438-0	Tom Cloud	Tailwind	03-30-2009
ITWT 439-0	Carl B. vs. JPL	Orchid Blossom	04-20-2009
ITWT 440-0	Dave Schiemann	These Days	04-27-2009

(ITWT 441-0 — ITWT 460-0)
Catalog #	Artist	Title	Date
ITWT 441-0	DJ Observer & Daniel Heatcliff	Fake Call	05-18-2009
ITWT 442-0	Carl B.	Auxiliary	05-18-2009
ITWT 443-0	Airbase	Back	05-25-2009
ITWT 444-0	Impact	Another Day / Strangers	05-11-2009
ITWT 445-0	Alex Kunnari	Eternity	06-01-2009
ITWT 446-0	Airbase	Wonders	07-20-2009
ITWT 447-0	Virtual Vault	Boundary	07-06-2009
ITWT 448-0	Chris R. vs. Carl B.	Take Off	06-29-2009
ITWT 449-0	DJ Observer & Daniel Heatcliff	Vision	07-20-2009
ITWT 450-0	Eddie Sender	Conspiration	08-10-2009
ITWT 451-0	Alex Kunnari	Last Sunrise	08-03-2009
ITWT 452-0	Tritonal	Jump Off	08-17-2009
ITWT 453-0	Dave Schiemann	Thoughts	09-07-2009
ITWT 454-0	Tom Cloud	Laguna / Last Days	08-31-2009
ITWT 455-0	JPL	Summer Skin	09-14-2009
ITWT 456-0	Space RockerZ	Zegema Beach	10-19-2009
ITWT 457-0	Daniel Heatcliff	Phoenix	10-27-2009
ITWT 458-0	Kris O'Neil	Paid My Douche	11-11-2009
ITWT 459-0	Reconceal	Second Chance	11-30-2009
ITWT 460-0	T.O.M. & Melvin Spix	Incredible Connection	11-16-2009

(ITWT 461-0 — ITWT 480-0)
Catalog #	Artist	Title	Date
ITWT 461-0	Estuera	Hot Monday	01-04-2010
ITWT 462-0	Midway	What If	11-23-2009
ITWT 463-0	Venaccio	Our Anthem	12-07-2009
ITWT 464-0	Space RockerZ	Weather The Storm	01-25-2010
ITWT 465-0	Impact	1001 Nights / La Mosca	03-08-2010
ITWT 466-0	Jason van Wyk	Always	03-15-2010
ITWT 467-0	Recon6	Easy Way Out	03-22-2010
ITWT 468-0	Danjo & Axess	Captivity	04-05-2010
ITWT 469-0	Kimito Lopez	I Am Rave	03-29-2010
ITWT 470-0	DJ Observer & Daniel Heatcliff	Cowabunga	03-08-2010
ITWT 471-0	Marc Simz vs. Aerofoil	Knights Templar	04-19-2010
ITWT 472-0	DJ Eremit & R.O.N.A.M	Herzschlag	06-28-2010
ITWT 473-0	Existone	Tales EP	05-10-2010
ITWT 474-0	Eddie Sender	Proxima Centauri	05-17-2010
ITWT 475-0	Saint X	Timeslider	05-10-2010
ITWT 476-0	Virtual Vault	Border Clans	05-31-2010
ITWT 477-0	Impact	They Came	06-07-2010
ITWT 478-0	Virtual Vault feat. Orjan	Too Late	06-14-2010
ITWT 479-0	Ralphie B.	Massive 2010	07-05-2010
ITWT 480-0	T.O.M. & Tommygoff	Latitude	06-21-2010

(ITWT 481-0 — ITWT 500-0)
Catalog #	Artist	Title	Date
ITWT 481-0	DJ Observer & Daniel Heatcliff	With Me	07-05-2010
ITWT 482-0	Tom Cloud feat. Antonia Lucas	Silent Sun	07-12-2010
ITWT 483-0	Eddie Sender	High Pressure	07-19-2010
ITWT 484-0	Jason van Wyk	September Rain	07-26-2010
ITWT 485-0	Jaro Sabo	San Rafael	08-02-2010
ITWT 486-0	C-Systems feat. Van Dresen	Embrace	08-09-2010
ITWT 487-0	Eddie Sender	Draco	08-16-2010
ITWT 488-0	Virtual Vault	Default	08-23-2010
ITWT 489-0	Bastian Salbart	Someone There	08-30-2010
ITWT 490-0	Tom Cloud feat. Antonia Lucas	Silent Sun (The Remixes)	09-06-2010
ITWT 491-0	T.O.M. & Tommygoff	Callisto Air	09-20-2010
ITWT 492-0	Carl B.	Maybe Once	12-27-2010
ITWT 493-0			
ITWT 494-0	Marc Simz	Forbidden City	10-04-2010
ITWT 495-0	Laydee Jane & Eddie Sender	Albatros	10-18-2010
ITWT 496-0	Albert Keyn	Rapsody	09-27-2010
ITWT 497-0	JPL	Young Love	11-01-2010
ITWT 498-0	Soarsweep	Madarika Beach	11-08-2010
ITWT 499-0	T.O.M.	Monsoon	11-15-2010
ITWT 500-0	Michal Poliak	Bomb Has Been Planted	11-22-2010

(ITWT 501-0 — ITWT 520-0)
Catalog #	Artist	Title	Date
ITWT 501-0	Existone feat. Hayley Parsons	August Aromas	11-29-2010
ITWT 502-0	Bastian Salbart	When Life Loses Flavor	12-20-2010
ITWT 503-0	Virtual Vault	Causeway Bay	12-13-2010
ITWT 504-0	Ruby & Tony	Inside You	12-20-2010
ITWT 505-0	Hodel & Sunstate	Distant Motion	01-03-2011
ITWT 506-0	Marc Simz	Delusory Hopes	01-10-2011
ITWT 507-0	T4L	Biogenesis	01-17-2011
ITWT 508-0	Existone	Electric Sundown	02-07-2011
ITWT 509-0	Tom Cloud feat. Tiff Lacey	A New Day	03-21-2011
ITWT 510-0	Alex Kunnari	New Life	03-07-2011
ITWT 511-0	Albert Keyn	Brother's Signs	03-14-2011
ITWT 512-0	Saint X	Ora / Tempus	03-28-2011
ITWT 513-0	Ruby & Tony	Randers	04-04-2011
ITWT 514-0	Webster vs. Baker	Chainsaw	04-18-2011
ITWT 515-0	Alex Kunnari	Helsinki	05-30-2011
ITWT 516-0	Pulser	Altitudes	06-21-2011
ITWT 517-0	Bastian Salbart	With Me	06-06-2011
ITWT 518-0	Oen Baeren	Nauru	06-13-2011
ITWT 519-0	Virtual Vault	After The Sunset	06-27-2011
ITWT 520-0	T4L	Mediterraneo	07-04-2011

(ITWT 521-0 — ITWT 540-0)
Catalog #	Artist	Title	Date
ITWT 521-0	Mistral	Ritmo Del Mundo	07-11-2011
ITWT 522-0	Jamaster A	Nanjing Express	08-01-2011
ITWT 523-0	Claessen & Martens	El Dorado	08-08-2011
ITWT 524-0	Marc Simz	Stealth	08-15-2011
ITWT 525-0	Carl B.	Whatever Happens	08-22-2011
ITWT 526-0			
ITWT 527-0	Tom Cloud	The Sky Is The Limit	09-19-2011
ITWT 528-0	Virtual Vault	Exodus	09-26-2011
ITWT 529-0	T4L	Like A Chord	11-21-2011
ITWT 530-0	Tom Cloud	C-Sharp	12-19-2011
ITWT 531-0	Dub Delay	Society	12-26-2011
ITWT 532-0	Kris O'Neil & JPL	No Porn Intended	01-09-2012
ITWT 533-0	T4L	Sensation	01-23-2012
ITWT 534-0	Akira Kayosa & Bevan Miller feat. Carly Kling	Phase 3	01-29-2012
ITWT 535-0	Ralphie B.	Massive 2012	02-06-2012
ITWT 536-0	Deepcraft	Forgotten	01-16-2012
ITWT 537-0	Mike Saint-Jules	Solarflame	02-13-2012
ITWT 538-0	Pedro Del Mar & Ingsha	Midnight Sun	02-20-2012
ITWT 539-0	Erik De Koning	Rain	02-27-2012
ITWT 540-0	Specific Slice & Sensi	I Lose My Control	03-05-2012

(ITWT 541-0 — ITWT 560-0)
Catalog #	Artist	Title	Date
ITWT 541-0	Dart Rayne & Yura Moonlight	Saturn	04-23-2012
ITWT 542-0	Julius Beat & Olbaid	Keep Love	05-14-2012
ITWT 543-0	Marc Simz	Forbidden City (2012 Remixes)	04-02-2012
ITWT 544-0	Saint X	Gabriel / Which Way	04-09-2012
ITWT 545-0	Facade & Q'Bass	Intensity	03-26-2012
ITWT 546-0	Setrise vs. Kay Wilder	Cannon	04-16-2012
ITWT 547-0	Amex & Basil O'Glue	Rusted Bliss	06-25-2012
ITWT 548-0	Bevan Miller	Illusions	06-11-2012
ITWT 549-0	Sergey Alyohin feat. TankTop	Burning Vaccination	06-04-2012
ITWT 550-0	Mike Saint-Jules	Flash Bomb	06-25-2012
ITWT 551-0	Iversoon & Alex Daf feat. Eskova	I'll Stay	07-09-2012
ITWT 552-0	Tellur	1989	07-30-2012
ITWT 553-0	Tellur	Zho	07-02-2012
ITWT 554-0	Virtual Vault	Smash	07-23-2012
ITWT 555-0	Oen Bearen & Pillow	Beyond Your Wildest Dreams	08-20-2012
ITWT 556-0	Facade	Melancholia	09-10-2012
ITWT 557-0	Michael Badal	North Shore	07-30-2012
ITWT 558-0	Allen Watts	Split Second	09-10-2012
ITWT 559-0	Klauss Goulart	Midnight Eyes	08-13-2012
ITWT 560-0	Paul Trainer	Parallax	09-03-2012

(ITWT 561-0 — ITWT 580-0)
Catalog #	Artist	Title	Date
ITWT 561-0	Rishabh Joshi	Polarize	09-03-2012
ITWT 562-0	Tellur & Sound Quelle	Sunshine	08-20-2012
ITWT 563-0	Tom Cloud feat. Antonia Lucas	4 o'Clock In The Morning (Promise Me)	09-10-2012
ITWT 564-0	Moonpax	Avantgard	12-24-2012
ITWT 565-0	Dart Rayne	Four Steps To Eternity	09-17-2012
ITWT 566-0	Sound Quelle	7.07	12-31-2012
ITWT 567-0	Setrise vs. Johann Stone	MNE	12-17-2012
ITWT 568-0	Marc Simz feat. Naomie Striemer	Out Of Sight	11-12-2012
ITWT 569-0	Bruce Cullen	Princess Bay	11-12-2012
ITWT 570-0	Mike Saint-Jules feat. J9	Waited Too Long	11-19-2012
ITWT 571-0	Svyatoslav Maltsev	Cold Sculpture	11-26-2012
ITWT 572-0	Amex vs. Lush & Simon	Outburst	12-10-2012
ITWT 573-0	Roy Malakian feat. Chris Jones	Vital Signs	11-26-2012
ITWT 574-0	Stefan Viljoen & Johan de Kock feat. Merldy B.	Shining	12-10-2012
ITWT 575-0	Steve Anderson & BRM	Leith Walk	12-17-2012
ITWT 576-0	Roy Malakian feat. Chris Jones	Vital Signs (Remixes)	12-24-2012
ITWT 577-0	Edvard Viber & Tiff Lacey	Is This Love	02-11-2013
ITWT 578-0	Lee Haslam feat. Emma Lock	Beautiful Places	02-11-2013
ITWT 579-0	Misja Helsloot feat. Fisher	Inspire	02-04-2013
ITWT 580-0	Tom Cloud feat. Antonia Lucas	Do It Over	03-11-2013

(ITWT 581-0 — ITWT 600-0)
Catalog #	Artist	Title	Date
ITWT 581-0	Lence & Pluton	Native Home	03-11-2013
ITWT 582-0	Marc Simz feat. Emma Lock	Angels	03-18-2013
ITWT 583-0	Thomas Mengel	This Is Who We Are	03-25-2013
ITWT 584-0	Akira Kayosa & Hugh Tolland	Small Something	04-01-2013
ITWT 585-0	Steve Kaetzel	I Need You	05-06-2013
ITWT 586-0	Purple Stories	Surface Tension	04-22-2013
ITWT 587-0	Jace Williams	Hope & Pray	05-13-2013
ITWT 588-0	Jamaster A feat. Bi Bi Zhou	I Miss You Missing Me	05-20-2013
ITWT 589-0	Existone	In Search Of Light	06-03-2013
ITWT 590-0	Vicky Devine	What To Do	06-17-2013
ITWT 591-0	Fictivision vs. C-Quence	Symbols (Will Atkinson 5000 Remix)	05-27-2013
ITWT 592-0	Stuart Millar	Forever This	06-10-2013
ITWT 593-0	Steve Sanders	Anthem EP	06-24-2013
ITWT 594-0	Jace Williams & Matt Dominguez	Heatwave	07-29-2013
ITWT 595-0	Alex Kunnari	Lifter (Remixes)	07-01-2013
ITWT 596-0	Bruce Cullen	Red Rum	08-05-2013
ITWT 597-0	Lee Haslam	Crack On	07-15-2013
ITWT 598-0	Existone	Between Heaven and Earth EP	08-05-2013
ITWT 599-0	David Forbes	Exist	08-12-2013
ITWT 600-0			

(ITWT 601-0 — ITWT 620-0)
Catalog #	Artist	Title	Date
ITWT 601-0	Mike Saint-Jules	The Landing	08-26-2013
ITWT 602-0	Sunset & Klauss Goulart	Alcyon	09-16-2013
ITWT 603-0	Jace Williams & Matt Dominguez	Fire Inside	09-23-2013
ITWT 604-0	Menno de Jong	Any Other Day	11-11-2013
ITWT 605-0	Steve Sanders	Unity & Love (EP)	12-16-2013
ITWT 606-0	Tom Colontonio feat. Amber Noel	See The Light	12-23-2013
ITWT 607-0	2nd Phase	Snapback	12-30-2013
ITWT 608-0	Fred Baker & Firebird	Bipolar	01-13-2014
ITWT 609-0	T4L & Mariano Ballejos	Dubai	01-20-2014
ITWT 610-0	Misja Helsloot	B.O.T.S.	01-27-2014
ITWT 611-0	Mike Saint-Jules	The Final Frontier (EP)	01-06-2014
ITWT 612-0	Amir Hussain & Tepes	Santa Ana	02-17-2014
ITWT 613-0	Inge Bergmann	Oblivion	02-10-2014
ITWT 614-0	Luke Terry feat. Silkskin	I Will Rise	03-10-2014
ITWT 615-0	T4L feat. Plaster	Back In Time	03-10-2014
ITWT 616-0	Menno de Jong feat. Noire Lee	Creatures Of The Night	03-10-2014
ITWT 617-0	Tom Cloud	Moments	03-24-2014
ITWT 618-0	Steve Anderson	Breathless	03-17-2014
ITWT 619-0	C-Systems	Aeneas	03-31-2014
ITWT 620-0	Sunset & Klauss Goulart	Alcyon (Remixes)	08-18-2014

(ITWT 621-0 — ITWT 640-0)
Catalog #	Artist	Title	Date
ITWT 621-0	T4L	Good Nightmare	03-31-2014
ITWT 622-0	Sneijder	Remember Me	04-14-2014
ITWT 623-0	Ali Wilson & Chris North	Tech Effect	04-07-2014
ITWT 624-0	Juice Crew	Along The Street	04-21-2014
ITWT 625-0	DoubleV	Reborn EP	05-05-2014
ITWT 626-0	Tiddey	Entrancer	04-28-2014
ITWT 627-0	Johan Ekman	Don't Give Up	10-06-2014
ITWT 628-0	Luke Terry feat. Love Dimension	Phoenix	06-16-2014
ITWT 628-1	Luke Terry feat. Love Dimension	Phoenix	06-02-2014
ITWT 629-0	Radion6	Daylight	06-09-2014
ITWT 630-0	Faruk Sabanci & James Dymond	Sphinx	08-04-2014
ITWT 631-0	Menno de Jong & Adam Ellis	Solicitude	06-23-2014
ITWT 632-0	Danjo	Hollow Glory	07-14-2014
ITWT 633-0	Various Artists	In Trance We Trust 020 (DJ Sampler Part 1)	06-23-2014
ITWT 634-0	Various Artists	In Trance We Trust 020 (DJ Sampler Part 2)	07-07-2014
ITWT 635-0	Various Artists	In Trance We Trust 020 (DJ Sampler Part 3)	07-21-2014
ITWT 636-0	Fabio XB & Mike Saint-Jules	Throne	08-11-2014
ITWT 637-0	Damian Wasse	Ancient Empire	07-28-2014
ITWT 638-0	A&N Project	Cubik	08-25-2014
ITWT 639-0	Fred Baker vs. Nyram	Confirmation (Maria Healy Remix)	09-01-2014
ITWT 640-0	Eco & Mike Saint-Jules	Azure	09-08-2014

(ITWT 641-0 — ITWT 660-0)
Catalog #	Artist	Title	Date
ITWT 641-0	Three Drives	Summer Madness	09-29-2014
ITWT 641-1	Three Drives	Summer Madness	09-15-2014
ITWT 642-0	Menno de Jong feat. Aneym	Your Heaven	10-13-2014
ITWT 643-0	Lucke Terry	Starlight	10-27-2014
ITWT 644-0	Damian Wasse	Say Goodbye	11-03-2014
ITWT 644-1	Damian Wasse	Say Goodbye	10-20-2014
ITWT 645-0	Ahmet Atasever	Traversing	11-10-2014
ITWT 646-0	Yves de Lacroix & John Evans feat. Lokka Vox	Ashamed	12-01-2014
ITWT 646-1	Yves de Lacroix & John Evans feat. Lokka Vox	Ashamed	11-17-2014
ITWT 647-0	Mike Saint-Jules feat. Molly Bancroft	Colour	01-26-2015
ITWT 647-2	Mike Saint-Jules feat. Molly Bancroft	Colour (Assaf/Interstellar Mixes)	03-09-2015
ITWT 648-0	Roy Malakian feat. Chris Jones	Vital Signs	01-05-2015
ITWT 649-0	Dimension	Ode 2	12-22-2014
ITWT 650-0	Radion6	Year Of Translation	01-05-2015
ITWT 651-0	Talla 2XLC & RAM feat. Kim Kona	Until The End	01-19-2015
ITWT 652-0	Johan Ekman feat. Michele C	Be Your Home	02-16-2015
ITWT 653-0	Misja Helsloot feat. Alex Staltari	Inevitable	02-23-2015
ITWT 654-0	Kiinetica	The Last Wish	03-02-2015
ITWT 655-0			
ITWT 656-0	Dreamy	Ninety9	03-30-2015
ITWT 657-0			
ITWT 658-0	Three Drives	Back To Basic	04-06-2015
ITWT 659-1	Menno De Jong feat. Aneym	Your Heaven - Kinetica Remix	2015-04-27
ITWT 659-2	Menno De Jong feat. Aneym	Your Heaven - Johan Ekman Remix	2015-04-27
ITWT 660-0	Amir Hussain	To The Lost	2015-04-06

== See also ==
- SongBird
