= Jonas Steur =

Belgian trance DJ and producer (born 1982)

- Also known as: Estuera; Evil Robot; Fable; Propylon; Silvertear; Yusuf
- Born: 1982 (age 43–44)
- Origin: Belgium
- Genres: Trance; house; techno; electronic
- Occupations: DJ; producer
- Instruments: Synthesizer; drum machine; sampler; sequencer
- Labels: Black Hole Recordings; Intuition Recordings; Spinnin Records
- Website: jonassteur.com

Jonas Steur (Dutch pronunciation: [ˈjoːnɑ ˈstøːr]; born 1982) is a Belgian trance DJ and producer. He is known under several additional aliases, most notably Estuera, the name under which he released most of his music until 2005 when he began DJing and releasing music under his birth name Jonas Steur. His music has also been featured several different times on the popular In Search of Sunrise series.

== Discography ==
=== Singles ===
- 2000 So Deep (as Silvertear)
- 2001 Blow Your Mind (as Sturgeon)
- 2001 God's Selection (as Global Killer)
- 2002 Reprogrammed / Mutation (as Sturgeon & Lenno)
- 2002 Tomorrow (with Ian van Dahl)
- 2004 Travels / 7 clouds (as Estuera)
- 2004 Exile / Morning glow (as Propylon)
- 2004 Tales From The South / City lights (as Estuera)
- 2004 Red Shores / Chapter 2 (as Estuera)
- 2005 Palma Solane (as Estuera vs Re:Locate)
- 2005 Castamara / Silent Waves
- 2006 Flow / Moon sugar (as Estuera)
- 2006 Above / Nightshift (as Fable)
- 2006 Second Turn / Sonrisa
- 2007 Nasty (as Estuera vs Re:Locate)
- 2007 Fall To Pieces (as Jonas Steur feat Jennifer Rene) / Born for the night
- 2007 Just Go (as Evil Robot)
- 2007 Level up
- 2008 The Night is Young ( as Steur & Bolier)
- 2008 Unleash/Seni seviyorum
- 2008 Holiday on Mars / Pure Bliss (as Jonas Steur feat Jennifer Rene)
- 2008 Call it Whatever You Fancy / Insert Title Here (as Evil Robot)
- 2008 Why work when you can play
- 2008 EP3 / voodoo woodoo / overboard funky (as Evil Robot)
- 2008 Cold Winds (as Jonas Steur feat Julie Thompson)
- 2008 Lost luggage (as Jonas Steur & Leon Bolier)
- 2009 Get busy
- 2009 Scrambled eggs (as Steur brothers)
- 2009 Hypnotized (as Jonas Steur feat Stephen Pickup)
- 2009 Save me (as Steur Brothers feat Jerique)
- 2009 Simple Pleasures
- 2009 Cold Winds (Remixes) (as Jonas Steur feat Julie Thompson)
- 2010 Fever
- 2010 Hot Monday / Cold Monday (as Estuera)
- 2010 Side by side (as Jonas Steur feat Julie Thompson)

=== Remixes ===
==== 2004 ====
- Ton T.B. – Dream Machine (Estuera remix)
- Re:Locate – Waterfall (Estuera remix)

==== 2005 ====
- Haylon – Starfighter (Jonas Steur remix)
- Solar Stone – The Calling (Jonas Steur remix)
- Elles De Graaf – Show You My World (Jonas Steur remix)

==== 2006 ====
- Kimito Lopez – Telepathy (Estuera Vs. Re:Locate remix)
- Danjo & Styles – What lies ahead (Estuera remix)
- Cosmic Gate – Should've known (Estuera remix)
- Niklas Harding – Ice beach (Jonas Steur remix)
- Mr. Sam Ft. Kirsty Hawkshaw – Split (Jonas Steur remix)
- Estuera – Tales From The South (Jonas Steur's Revision Flow)

==== 2007 ====
- Sied Van Riel – Changing places (Jonas Steur remix)

==== 2008 ====
- Ronski Speed Ft. Aruna – All The Way (Jonas Steur remix)
- Soliquid – Maybe you (Jonas Steur remix)
- Leon Bolier – XD (Jonas Steur remix)
- Adrian Ivan – Re-Back (Jonas Steur remix)
- Deadmau5 – Clockwork (Jonas Steur ultra violence remix)
- Myon & Shane 54 – Trapped (Jonas Steur inevitable remix)
- Sied Van Riel – People know (Jonas Steur remix)
- Roger M Ft. Eva – By Your Side (Jonas Steur remix)

==== 2009 ====
- Ben Preston – Elizabeth (Jonas Steur remix)
- Roger M feat Eva – Serenity (Jonas Steur remix)
- Elsa Hill – Stay in my dream (Jonas Steur Dreamcatcher mix)
- MuseArctic – At Sunrise (Jonas Steur remix)
- Bartlett Bros Ft. Micky Vi – Sunshine In Panama (Jonas Steur remix)
- Tim Besamusca – Sanctum (Jonas Steur remix)
- Micah Ft. Aubrey – Rush (Jonas Steur remix)
- Paco Ymar – Evolution (Jonas Steur remix)
- Simon Pitt Ft. Vikki Lorenzo – Sun And Moon (Jonas Steur remix)
- Fabio XB Ft. Micky Vi – Make This Your Day (Jonas Steur remix)
- First state Ft. Sarah Howells – Brave (Jonas Steur remix)
- Roger M Ft. Eva – Fading away (Jonas Steur remix)

==== 2010 ====
- Mr. Sam & Andy Duguid Ft. Amanda Wilson – Satisfaction Guaranteed (as Steur Bros.)
- JES – Love Song (Jonas Steur remix)
- Lost Stories – Flight 447 ( Jonas Steur remix)
- Orjan Nilsen & Virtual vault – Too late (Jonas Steur remix)
- Roger M feat Eva – So into you (Jonas Steur remix)
- Walsh & Mcauly Ft. Antonia Lucas – I'm Only Human (Jonas Steur remix)
- JES – Awaken (Jonas Steur remix)

=== Albums ===
Jonas Steur's debut album Born For The Night was released on the September 17, 2007.

Track list:

1. Fall To Pieces (vocals written and performed by Jennifer Rene)
2. Nightwalker
3. Level Up
4. Seven Moons And A Bit
5. Pure Bliss (vocals written and performed by Jennifer Rene)
6. Rise And Shine
7. Born For The Night
8. Left In A Daze
9. I Know
10. La Nuit Noire (feat. Re:Locate)

The album also included a bonus second CD, featuring a mix of some of Jonas' older tunes:

1. Tales From The South (album version)
2. Flow
3. City Lights
4. Silent Waves
5. 7 Clouds
6. Palma Solane (feat. Re:Locate)
7. Red Shores
8. Second Turn
9. Castamara

The second album Tales is a 4-part series of mini albums. Part 1 Courage was released on 16 November 2010. The parts 2 and were released in 2011 and 2012, and part 4 is still in production.

Tales Part 1 track list:

1. The road goes on
2. Resist
3. Embrace
4. Traverse
5. Hazy days

== Trivia ==
- His song "So Deep" was used in the game Dance Dance Revolution, specifically for DDRMAX Dance Dance Revolution 6thMix. It is remixed and called "Perfect Sphere Mix" and credited as Silvertear.

== See also ==
- Black Hole Recordings
