= Black Hole Recordings =

Dutch record label

- Founded: 1997; 29 years ago
- Founder: Arny Bink; Tijs Verwest
- Genre: Trance, progressive trance
- Country of origin: Netherlands
- Location: Breda, The Netherlands
- Official website: www.blackholerecordings.com

Black Hole Recordings is a Dutch record label founded by Tijs Verwest (Tiësto) and Arny Bink in 1997. In August 2009, Tiësto decided to leave Black Hole Recordings, setting up the record label Musical Freedom in association with PIAS Entertainment Group.

== History ==
=== Background ===
In late 1994, Tiësto signed with Basic Beat, where he met Arny Bink. Tiësto released records on the sub-label Trashcan, founded by Arny, and later created the Guardian Angel sub-label with Arny in which they introduced the Forbidden Paradise series. In the fall of 1997, Bink and Tiësto decided to leave Basic Beat and create their own parent label, Black Hole Recordings. Trashcan was discontinued and Guardian Angel continued releasing music up to 2002. Through Black Hole, Tiësto released the Magik series and created two major sub-labels; SongBird and In Trance We Trust. From 1998 to 1999 Tiësto released music on Planetary Consciousness, where he met A&R Hardy Heller and invited him to release some records on Black Hole. Tiësto later included the In Search of Sunrise series on Songbird and opened a new division of Black Hole, Magik Muzik, which was established in 2001. Magik Muzik released major chart-topping songs by Tiësto. Initially it released exclusive material but has since expanded.

=== 1997–2004 ===
In 1997, the label was founded by Tiësto and Arny Bink and was privately launched by Tiësto's own productions and mixes. After the release of Magik One: First Flight and Space Age 1.0 Tiësto's fame began to rise and so did the label. In 1998, due to the success of the first two DJ Mix compilations, he and Arny decided to work with other DJs and released "In Trance We Trust 001" mixed by Misja Helsloot, which was one of the first commercially available trance compilations at that time. With the support the imprint gave to Misja, other DJs and producers got interested in working along with Black Hole. The label released the first DJ Mix compilations of many artists like DJ Stigma, Ferry Corsten, Armin van Buuren, Johan Gielen, Mark Norman Cor Fijneman, DJ Montana, and Ton TB. As Tiësto released 12" vinyls for himself he also introduced many tracks from other DJs through the vinyl system on 10 different sub-labels, each having its own specific style of electronic dance music. Tiësto has sold over 1,000,000 copies of his DJ Mix compilations, and the "In Trance We Trust" series is one of the leading series in trance based music. Misja Helsloot was the first to work with Tiësto in In Trance We Trust, Tiësto only helped in compiling the DJ Mixes until the fifth installment in 2001.

Black Hole Recordings: Best of 1997-2004

Between 1999 and 2000, Tiësto released his own Artist Profile Series after Ferry Corsten's Solar Serenades DJ Mix, Tiësto's number two included Magik Four: A New Adventure; Black Hole CD 07 is the only CD which is released in the Artist Profile Series, after the four first Magik CDs were re-released in 2000 with new artwork. The sleeves on the first copies were replaced due to the unauthorized use of Patrick Woodroffe's artwork. DJ René followed the Artist Profile Series with number three All Over The World, Armin van Buuren's Boundaries of Imagination which became the fourth and fifth installment with DJ HH // Hardy Heller's Artist Profile Mix in Motion.

In the first day of 2001, Prime Time Management became the official booking agency of Tiësto, its main objective is the development of Tiësto as an artist. In 2001 Jonas Steur joined the label and released music under the artist name Estuera. That same year Ralphie B signed to the label when Tiësto heard one track from him and was released on the "In Trance We Trust" imprint. Starting 16 December 2004, Black Hole began compiling its catalogue for purchase download at beatport.com; its sublabels were added later that year.

In 2004 the label released a 2xCD compilation, "Black Hole Recordings: Best of 1997-2004"; the first disc contains unmixed tracks and the second disc is mixed by DJ Ton T.B. The DJ Mix contains the best of the label from 1997 to 2004.

=== 2005–2008 ===
In 2005, Sander van Dien and Ralphie B collaborated on some tracks, they released songs under the alias Midway and later created the alias "First State" which is a breakthrough according to the label. The First State album "Time Frame" has released already two singles and it is expected that "Time Frame II – the sequel" and "Time Frame III" will be released later. It was 2006 when Black Hole asked Jonas Steur for a solo album; "Born for the night" was released in 2007. In 2007 Barcelona Urban Sound released Trance World Series: Black Hole in Session which featured two CDs, one mixed by T4L and one by Slamm!, tracks featured in the compilation were by artists of the Black Hole repertoire.

Streamline Studios, an independent game developer and digital content provider for AAA videogames and Black Hole Recordings have formed, a joint venture which would provide sound solutions for digital entertainment including the entire catalog of Black Hole's artists. The first work that Streamline Sound has contributed is on the massively multiplayer online (MMO) role-playing PC game Sword of the New World: Granado Espada with 17 12" tracks,

Streamline Studios, an independent game developer and digital content provider for video games and Black Hole have confirmed the formation of Streamline Sound, a joint venture to provide sound for digital entertainment. Streamline Sound combines audio services and 5.1 studio with the artist catalog of Black Hole Recordings, including Grammy-nominated electronic music superstar Tiësto and a large number of independent composers and musicians. Forza Motorsport 2 which includes Tom Clouds' track "Told You So" and HoopWorld.

Streamline Sound is the new partner for independent artists who want to create audio for video games, I wanted to help create a platform to not only put my own musical ideas into games but the music of innovative artists from all genres, whether electronic, classical, rock, or hip-hop.

— said Black Hole Recordings artist and co-founder Tiësto.

Iwan de Kuijper, New Media Manager for Black Hole Recordings will be the General Manager of Streamline Sound dealing with business matters, along with music industry veteran artist and engineer Tom Pearce functioning as Audio Director for projects. Currently Streamline Sound has three main artists, ambient expert Tom Pearce, classical composer Geert Huinink, and electronic producer Tiësto. Geert Huinink has been assigned to compose game soundtracks and is part of the Virtualish project to create video game scores in a theatrical show. Streamline Sound will release the soundtrack of Korean MMORPG Granado Espada in the first half of 2008.

Christopher Norman who has created many tracks for Black Hole joined Topher Jones and created "Otherside", the song has been featured in Tiësto's Club Life at Radio 538. Since the creation of the track, Jones was invited by Tiësto to open for him on his In Search of Sunrise: North American Summer Tour 2008. Three other songs from Jones were included in previous podcasts; "Castaway", "Club 37" and his remix of Tyler Michaud vs. JPL's – "Five Days Till Sunrise". "Young Life" is another track from Jones which was played by Tiësto at the In Search of Sunrise 6: Ibiza release party to promote the inclusion of Jones to Black Hole.

On 24 May 2008, the Dutch club "The Matrixx" in Nijmegen featured the performance of artists like Cor Fijneman, Cosmic Gate, First State, Mark Norman, Mr. Sam, Phynn, Progression and Ton TB. After the release of this party, the exclusive best of CD from the imprint called "10 Years of Black Hole Recordings" was released. An event which took place in Taipei named "Black Hole Label Night" was recorded and release through Avex Taiwan Inc., the credits of the mix were given to DJ J-Six which has no relation with the label and only recorded the event. All tracks featured are from current Black Hole artists with the exception of Josh Millstone with his song "As The Day Fades". Black Hole also introduced Fris!, which is another subdivision of the label which emphasizes on progressive house. As of January 2009, Black Hole began releasing "Captivate", its first free online magazine through Myebooks containing information on forthcoming tracks and albums as well as artists' biographies. In March 2009 after signing Richard Durand as part of Magik Muzik, Black Hole decided to absorb the label in which Durand got his most popular hits, Terminal 4.

=== 2009–2010: Departure of Tiësto and In Search of Sunrise ===
In August 2009 Tiësto decided to part ways with Black Hole Recordings, setting up the label Musical Freedom in association with [PIAS] Entertainment Group. In April 2010 Black Hole Recordings announced that the eighth album in the In Search of Sunrise compilation series would be mixed by Dutch trance producer Richard Durand, and released in May 2010. He continued to mix theIn Search of Sunrise series until 2015 with In Search of Sunrise 13.5: Amsterdam. Markus Schulz took over as the curator of the franchise in 2018 with In Search of Sunrise 14 and has produced at least 6 mixes on the title since.

== Artists ==
- BT
- Christina Novelli
- Ciaran McAuley
- Clara Yates
- Cosmic Gate
- Daniel Wanrooy
- Emma Hewitt
- Haliene
- Johan Gielen
- Markus Schulz
- Richard Durand
- Siskin
- Solarstone
- Tiësto
- Zoya

== Awards ==
Black Hole Recordings was nominated for the WMC Awards: Miami as Best Global Dance Record Label in the years 2008 to 2011.

== Labels ==
- Ace of Clubs
- Afterdark
- AVA Recordings (includes sublabels AVA White and AVA Chill)
- Avanti
- Coldharbour Recordings (includes sublabel Coldharbour Black)
- Damaged Records
- Deep In Thought
- Dinamode Records
- Drizzly Escape
- Elpida Music
- Force of Habit
- Gameroom Records
- GO Music
- Heavens Gate
- HTE Recordings
- In Control Recordings
- In Trance We Trust
- KSS3TE Recordings
- LNG Records
- Magic Island Records (includes sublabels Magic Island Elevate and Magic Island Deep)
- Magik Muzik
- Mental Asylum Records
- Nocturnal Knights Music (includes sublabels Nocturnal Nights Fusion and Nocturnal Knights Reworked)
- Outburst Records (includes sublabel Outburst Twilight)
- Pure Trance Recordings (includes sublabels Pure Progressive and Pure Trance Neon)
- Regenerate
- Ride Recordings
- Scorchin Records
- Serendipity Muzik
- Skullduggery
- SongBird
- Songspire Records
- Subculture
- Techburst Records
- Tell You Something
- TurnItUp Muzik
- Universal Nation
- Victims Helpline
- VII
- Wake Your Mind Records

== Captivate ==
This is a list of the issues of Black Hole's monthly free online magazine, Captivate, launched in January 2009.

- Captivate 001: Carl B.
- Captivate 002: Cosmic Gate
- Captivate 003: Daniel Wanrooy
- Captivate 004: Richard Durand
- Captivate 005: Ferry Corsten

Album presentation

Album presentations usually include press release and sometimes short mp3 clips of songs featured in the album.

- Cosmic Gate: Signs of the Times
- Richard Durand: Always the Sun
- Robbie Rivera: Juicy Ibiza 2009
- Cosmic Gate & Hardwell: Privilege Ibiza
- Julie Thompson: Feeling For Corners
- Robbie Rivera: Closer to the Sun

Specials

- Ibiza 2009

== See also ==
- Black Hole Recordings albums
- Black Hole Recordings singles
- Lists of record labels
- List of electronic music record labels
