= Adagio =

Adagio (Italian for 'slowly', from ad agio 'at ease') may refer to:

== Music ==
- Adagio, a tempo marking, indicating that music is to be played slowly, or a composition intended to be played in this manner
- Adagio (band), a French progressive metal band

=== Albums ===
- Adagio (Sweetbox album)
- Adagio (Solitude Aeturnus album)
- Adagio (T.H.C. album)

=== Films ===
- Adagio (2000 film), a 2000 Russian film
- Adagio (2023 film), a 2023 Italian film

=== Songs ===
- Adagio in C Minor, by Nicholas Britell for the TV series Succession
- Adagio for Strings, by Samuel Barber
- Adagio in G minor, attributed to Tomaso Albinoni, composed by Remo Giazotto
- "Adagio" (Lara Fabian song), from the 2000 album Lara Fabian
  - performed by Dimash Kudaibergen
- Adagio for Strings (Tiësto), a 2005 cover of Barber's Adagio by Tiësto
- "Adagio in D Minor" (John Murphy song), from the soundtrack to the 2007 film Sunshine
- "Adagio", by Epica, on the 2008 The Classical Conspiracy album
- "Adagio For TRON", from the 2010 TRON: Legacy soundtrack, by Daft Punk
- “Adagio of Life and Death” I, II and III by Joe Hisaishi for the soundtrack of Princess Mononoke (1997)
- "Adagio", by Secret Garden, on the 1996 album Songs from a Secret Garden
- "Adagio in C Minor", by Yanni, from the 1997 album Tribute
- “Adagio”, by Safri Duo, from the 2001 album Episode II
- "Adagio of Spartacus and Phrygia", by Aram Khachaturian, from Spartacus (ballet)
- "Adagio (1980)", by Bernard Parmegiani

== Human motion ==
- Adagio (acrobatics), a form of acrobalance found in circus and dance
- Adagio (ballet technique)

== Other uses ==
- Adagio (hotel), an apartment hotel brand
- Adagio Dazzle, a character in the movie My Little Pony: Equestria Girls – Rainbow Rocks
- Adagio, a playable half-angel half-dragon character in the video game Vainglory

== See also ==
- Adagio for Strings (disambiguation)
