= List of UK Dance Singles Chart number ones of 2003 =

These are The Official UK Charts Company's UK Dance Chart number one hits of 2003. The dates listed in the menus below represent the Saturday after the Sunday the chart was announced, as per the way the dates are given in chart publications such as the ones produced by Billboard, Guinness, and Virgin.

== Chart history ==
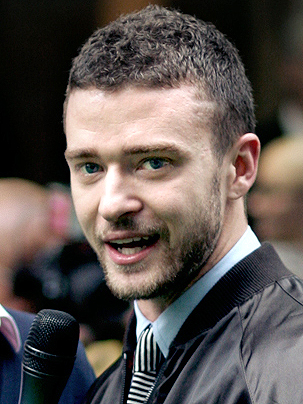
Justin Timberlake reached number one with "Rock Your Body".

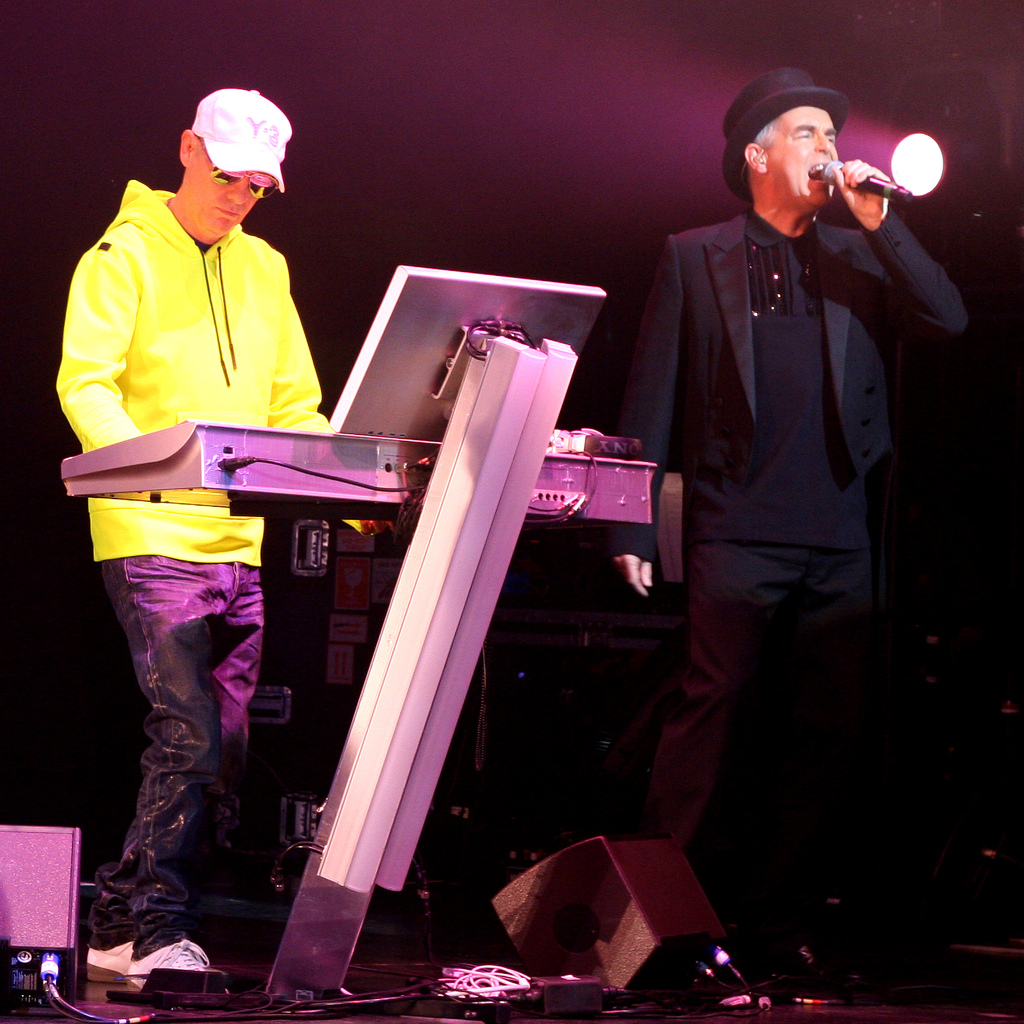
Pet Shop Boys had a dance number one with "Miracles".

Issue date	Song	Artist(s)	Reference(s)
4 January	"Wolf"	Shy FX	
11 January	"Land of the Living"	Milk Inc.	
18 January	"Changes"	Sandy Rivera	
25 January	"Love Story"	Layo & Bushwacka!	
1 February	"Fix My Sink"	DJ Sneak featuring Bear Who	
8 February	"Fix My Sink"	DJ Sneak featuring Bear Who	
15 February	"Love Story"	Layo & Bushwacka!	
22 February	"Deep South"	Layo & Bushwacka!	
1 March	"Keep on Rising"	Jay-J featuring Latrice Barnett	
8 March	"Move Your Feet"	Junior Senior	
15 March	"Mo' Fire"	Bad Company UK/Rawhill Cru	
22 March	"Together"	Artificial Funk	
29 March	"Wondering Why"	M. J. Cole	
5 April	"Make Luv"	Room 5 featuring Oliver Cheatham	
12 April	"Make Luv"	Room 5 featuring Oliver Cheatham	
19 April	"Make Luv"	Room 5 featuring Oliver Cheatham	
26 April	"Who Said (Stuck in the UK)"	Planet Funk	
3 May	"Destination"	DT8 Project	
10 May	"Loneliness"	Tomcraft	
17 May	"Easy"	Groove Armada	
24 May	"Loneliness"	Tomcraft	
31 May	"Rock Your Body"	Justin Timberlake	
7 June	"Rock Your Body"	Justin Timberlake	
14 June	"Rock Your Body"	Justin Timberlake	
21 June	"Rock Your Body"	Justin Timberlake	
28 June	"How Did You Know"	Kurtis Mantronik	
5 July	"Forever More"	Moloko	
12 July	"Nothing But You"	Paul van Dyk	
19 July	"Hollywood"	Madonna	
26 July	"Satisfaction"	Benny Benassi presents The Biz	
2 August	"Satisfaction"	Benny Benassi presents The Biz	
9 August	"Bandwagon Blues"	Twisted Individual	
16 August	"It's Up To You	Layo & Bushwacka!	
23 August	"It's Up To You	Layo & Bushwacka!	
30 August	"Barcelona"	D.Kay	
6 September	"But I Feel Good"	Groove Armada	
13 September	"Sympathy for the Devil(Remix)"	Rolling Stones	
20 September	"My Time"	Dutch featuring Crystal Waters	
27 September	"E Samba"	Junior Jack	
4 October	"E Samba"	Junior Jack	
11 October	"So Damn Beautiful"	Poloroid	
18 October	"Big Fun" (Remix)	Inner City	
25 October	"Just a Little More Love"	David Guetta	
1 November	"Just a Little More Love"	David Guetta	
8 November	"Born Slippy Nuxx"	Underworld	
15 November	"Slow"	Kylie Minogue	
22 November	"Lucky Star"	Basement Jaxx	
29 November	"Miracles"	Pet Shop Boys	
6 December	"Slow"	Kylie Minogue	
13 December	"Cannot Contain This"	Moloko	
20 December	"Cry Little Sister (I Need You Now)"	Lost Brothers	
27 December	"RA"	Shy FX	

== See also ==
- List of number-one singles of 2003 (UK)
- List of UK Independent Singles Chart number ones of 2003
- List of UK Rock & Metal Singles Chart number ones of 2003
