= Just Be (disambiguation) =

Just Be may refer to:

- Just Be, a 2004 album by Tiësto
  - "Just Be" (Tiësto song), the album's title track
  - Just Be: Remixed, remix album
- "Just Be" (Paloma Faith song)
