= Love Comes Again =

Single by Tiësto featuring BT

from the album Just Be
- Released: 8 April 2004
- Recorded: 2003
- Genre: Vocal trance
- Length: 8:15
- Label: Magik Muzik; Black Hole; Bang On!; Nebula; Playground; Sirup; Media Records; Kontor; Independence
- Songwriter(s): Brian Transeau; Tijs Verwest
- Producer(s): BT; Tiësto

Tiësto singles chronology
"Traffic" (2003)	"Love Comes Again" (2004)	"Just Be" (2004)

BT singles chronology
"Somnambulist (Simply Being Loved)" (2003)	"Love Comes Again" (2004)	"Break My Fall" (2007)

"Love Comes Again" is a song by Dutch DJ Tiësto featuring vocals by BT. It was released in 2004 as the second single from Tiësto's second studio album Just Be. It was written by Brian Transeau and Tiësto. In exchange to the collaboration of BT in his album, Tiësto remixed that same year one of BT's songs, "Force of Gravity" (from BT's album Emotional Technology) and was released on The Technology EP. Australian releases of "Love Comes Again" under Bang On! Recordings contain a B-side which was previously released as a single, known as "Traffic".

== Formats and track listings ==
=== CD, maxi singles ===
Netherlands maxi-single

1. "Love Comes Again" (Radio Edit) – 3:15
2. "Love Comes Again" (Original 12" Version) – 8:15
3. "Love Comes Again (Mark Norman Remix) – 7:24

Germany maxi-single

1. "Love Comes Again" (Radio Edit) – 3:15
2. "Love Comes Again" (Original 12" Version) – 8:15
3. "Love Comes Again (Mark Norman Remix) – 7:24
4. "Traffic" (DJ Montana Re-Edit) – 5:11

United Kingdom maxi-single

1. "Love Comes Again" (Radio Edit) – 2:59
2. "Love Comes Again" (Original 12" Version) – 8:07
3. "Love Comes Again (Mark Norman Remix) – 7:20
4. "Love Comes Again" (Instrumental) – 8:08
5. "Love Comes Again" (video)

Switzerland single

1. "Love Comes Again" (Radio Edit) – 3:15
2. "Love Comes Again" (DJ Tatana Sirup Remix) – 7:04

Australia maxi-single

1. "Love Comes Again" (Radio Edit) – 3:15
2. "Love Comes Again" (Original 12" Version) – 8:07
3. "Love Comes Again (Mark Norman Remix) – 7:20
4. "Traffic" (DJ Montana 12" Edit) – 7:39
5. "Traffic" – 6:57
6. "Traffic" (Max Walder Remix) – 7:32

=== 12" vinyl ===
Magik Muzik 12" vinyl

1. "Love Comes Again" (Radio Edit) – 3:15
2. "Love Comes Again" (Original 12" Version) – 8:07

Media Records 12" vinyl

1. "Love Comes Again" (Original 12" Version) – 8:07
2. "Love Comes Again" (Mark Norman Remix) – 7:19
3. "Traffic" (Original Mix) – 6:56

Kontor Records, Nebula, Nettwerk America, Independence Records 12" vinyl

1. "Love Comes Again" (Original 12" Version) – 8:07
2. "Love Comes Again" (Mark Norman Remix) – 7:24

Sirup 12" vinyl

1. "Love Comes Again" (DJ Tatana Sirup Remix) – 7:04
2. "Love Comes Again" (DJ Tatana Dub)
3. "Love Comes Again" (Mark Norman Remix) – 7:24

Bang On! 12" vinyl

1. "Love Comes Again" (Original 12" Version) – 8:07
2. "Love Comes Again" (Mark Norman Remix) – 7:19
3. "Traffic" (DJ Montana 12" Edit) – 7:39
4. "Traffic" (Original Mix) – 6:56

=== "Love Comes Again" and "Traffic" ===
Australia 12" vinyl

1. "Love Comes Again" (Original 12" Version) – 8:07
2. "Love Comes Again" (Mark Norman Remix) – 7:20
3. "Traffic" (Montana Re-Edit) – 7:39
4. "Traffic" (Max Walder Mix) – 7:34

Australia maxi-single

1. "Love Comes Again" (Radio Edit) – 3:15
2. "Love Comes Again" (Original 12" Version) – 8:07
3. "Love Comes Again" (Mark Norman Remix) – 7:20
4. "Traffic" (DJ Montana 12" Edit) – 7:39
5. "Traffic" (Original Mix) – 6:57
6. "Traffic" (Max Walder Mix) – 7:32

== Charts ==
=== Weekly charts ===
Chart (2004)	Peak position
Australia (ARIA)	111
Belgium (Ultratop 50 Flanders)	6
Finland (Suomen virallinen lista)	12
Germany (GfK)	64
Hungary (Dance Top 40)	7
Hungary (Single Top 40)	5
Netherlands (Dutch Top 40)	3
Netherlands (Single Top 100)	4
Scotland (OCC)	25
Switzerland (Schweizer Hitparade)	94
UK Singles (OCC)	30
UK Dance (OCC)	1
US Billboard Hot Dance Club Play	32
US Billboard Hot Dance Airplay	15
US Billboard Hot Dance Singles Sales	4
US Billboard Hot Singles Sales	36

=== Year-end charts ===
Chart (2004)	Position
Belgium (Ultratop Flanders)	52
Netherlands (Dutch Top 40)	7
Netherlands (Single Top 100)	41

== Official versions ==
- Radio Edit – (3:15)
- Original 12" Version – (8:07)
- Mark Norman Remix – (7:20)
- Album Version – (8:06)
- Instrumental – (8:08)
- Myon and Shane 54 Monster Mix – (6:32)
- Hardwell 2011 Rework – (7:43)
