= UR/A Tear in the Open =

"UR" / "A Tear in the Open"
- "UR" / "A Tear in the Open" 12" Vinyl cover

Single by Tiësto

from the album Just Be
- A-side: "UR"
- B-side: "A Tear in the Open"
- Released: 26 September 2005
- Recorded: 2003
- Genre: Electronic
- Label: Magik Muzik; Black Hole; Nebula
- Songwriters: Tijs Verwest; Matt Hales
- Producer: Tiësto

Tiësto singles chronology
"Adagio for Strings" (2005)	"UR" / "A Tear in the Open" (2005)	"dance4life" (2006)

Audio sample
- "A Tear in the Open": file; help

"UR" and "A Tear in the Open" are two electronic music tracks which appeared on Tiësto's second studio album in 2004, entitled Just Be. Unlike Tiesto's other album from 2004, Parade of the Athletes, Just Be featured only unmixed tracks.

Tom Holkenborg, also known as Junkie XL, remixed the track "UR", The song originally features Matt Hales from Aqualung who wrote and sang the lyrics in the track and was later featured in Tiësto's In Search of Sunrise 4: Latin America compilation.

The B-side from "UR" is "A Tear in the Open", which was remixed by Leama & Moor and was later included along the remix of "UR" in Just Be: Remixed which features a variety of remixes from tracks of the album, the remix album was officially released in 2006 after the remixes were compiled. The single reached number 8 on the UK Dance Singles Chart in October 2005.

"A Tear In The Open" is originally a Gaelic folk song called Ailein duinn, first featured as a film score in the movie Rob Roy and afterwards as the well known interpretation by Scottish folk band Capercaillie. On this track the vocals were sampled as a courtesy of Spectrasonics' Vocal Planet. Many more other artists sampled from the same music library to compose their own version of the folk song.

The title of the 12" vinyl can be read as "UR a Tear in the Open" and stands alone as a simple sentence. The album cover for the single was expected as an alternative cover of the album Just Be, the album itself had various covers, but some were later used on singles; Such is the case of this vinyl.

== Formats and track listings ==
=== 12" Vinyl ===
Magik Muzik, Nebula 12" Vinyl

1. "UR" (Junkie XL Air Guitar Mix)–12:32
2. "A Tear In The Open (Leama & Moor Remix)–9:56

== Personnel ==
- "UR" (Junkie XL Air Guitar Mix)
  - Additional Producer, Remixer: Junkie XL
  - Vocals: Aqualung
  - Writer(s): Matt Hales, Tiësto, Naomi Striemer & Michael Scherchen
  - Composers(s): Matt Hales, Michael Scherchen & Naomi Striemer
  - Aqualung appears courtesy of First Column Management.
  - Tom Holkenborg (Junkie XL) appears courtesy of Roadrunner Records B.V
- "A Tear In The Open (Leama & Moor Remix)"
  - Additional Producer, Remixer: Leama & Moor
  - Writers(s): Tiësto, Geert Huinink & Daniël Stewart
  - Composer(s): Daniël Stewart, Geert Huinink

== Official versions ==
- "UR" (Junkie XL Air Guitar Remix) – 12:32
- "UR" (Junkie XL Air Guitar Remix) – 7:31 (as featured in In Search of Sunrise 4: Latin America)
- "A Tear In The Open" (Leama & Moor Remix) 9:56

== Charts ==
Chart (2006)	Peak position
Hungary (Dance Top 40)	36

== Release history ==
Region	Date	Label	Format	Catalog
United Kingdom	26 September 2005	Nebula	vinyl, 12", Picture Disc, Limited Edition	NEBT082
Netherlands	27 September 2005	Magik Muzik	vinyl, 12", Picture Disc, Limited Edition	Magik Muzik 826–6
