= Human Technology (EP) =

EP by BT
- Released: November 14, 2005
- Length: 12:27
- Label: Human Imprint
- Producer: BT

BT chronology
The Technology EP (2004)	Human Technology (2005)	This Binary Universe (2006)

The Human Technology EP is an extended play released by the composer BT in 2005 under the Human Imprint label. It contains two remixes of two different songs from BT's fourth studio album, Emotional Technology. The two songs remixed were "Knowledge of Self", a track featuring the Gang Starr rapper Guru, and "The Great Escape", a track featuring Caroline Lavelle, with remixes by Evol Intent and Alliance, respectively. It is BT's fifth EP and most recent to date.

== Track listing ==
Side A
No.	Title	Length
1.	"Knowledge of Self (Evol Intent Remix)"	6:07

Side AA
No.	Title	Length
1.	"The Great Escape (Alliance Remix)"	6:20
