= Geert Huinink =

- Also known as: Modus Operandi; Photon Project; Twenty-Something; Headstrong; G&A Project; White Russians; Magik Muzik
- Born: 29 April 1971 (age 55)
- Origin: Heemstede, Netherlands
- Genres: Epic trance
- Years active: 2000–present

Geert Huinink (Dutch pronunciation: [ɣeːrt ˈɦœynɪŋk]; born 29 April 1971) is a Dutch electronic music producer and classical composer. His compositions have been released under many different aliases. There is little published about him, but his name has surfaced around some influential and respected leaders in the Trance music scene. He has released tracks under Tiësto's name and has collaborated with artists like Cor Fijneman and Daniël Stewart. Geert has also produced for a Dutch television show called "Meiden van de Wit" in 2002. Game soundtrack composition is another forte of his.

== Dawnseekers ==
The Dawnseekers is one of the aliases used by Geert, along with Alco Lammers, that produced melodic and uplifting trance tracks during the early 2000s. The trademark of their tracks were the use of lush strings very closely resembling violins and beautiful horns combined with other orchestrated instruments. There were just a few tracks, "euphoric" in nature, completed during the few years that the duo were active as the Dawnseekers. Their music was picked up by Black Hole Recordings and Platipus Records. The pair of Dutch artists [presumably Geert and Alco Lammers?] were active in remixing as well as original productions. A track originally by Art of Trance was redone by Dawnseekers.

== Photon Project ==
Alco Lammers was again Geert's partner in the collaboration under the Photon Project alias. One of their major hits was with the track "Enlightenment" released in 2000. The track features a melody played by what sounds like a symphony orchestra and features a whispering sample by Gary Oldman from the movie Léon: The Professional. It goes:

I like these calm little moments before the storm. Can you hear it? It's like when you put your head to the grass and you can hear the growin', you can hear the insects, z-z-z-z-zah!"

"Enlightenment" stops short of 12 minutes in playing time, of which 4–5 minutes consists of soothing symphony. The B-side of this release is "Illumination". "Illumination" focuses more on the Trancier part even though it also has a slight orchestrated breakdown in the middle. It clocks in at 10 minutes and 30 seconds. The track "Enlightenment" was remixed by Geert Huinink himself in 2005 and released as a free mp3 on the Internet, and also appears on the Black Hole Recordings: Best of 1997–2004 compilation.

A successful remix of Andain's "Beautiful Things" (as Photon Project) appeared on notable compilations.

== Work with Tiësto ==
In addition to working with Tiësto's Black Hole Recordings label, Geert is also credited with writing and producing the title track for Tiesto's Elements of Life album. On Tiesto's earlier Just Be release, Geert has been credited as co-composing the expansive lead track "Forever Today" as well as "A Tear in the Open". In 2001 a remix of OceanLab's hit "Clear Blue Water" was done.

This table summarizes the work Geert has performed on Tiesto albums:

In My Memory

- "Magik Journey"

Parade of the Athletes

- "Olympic Flame" Co-produced with Daniël Stewart
- "Victorious" Co-produced with Daniël Stewart
- "Forever Today" Co-produced with Daniël Stewart

Just Be

- "Forever Today"
- "A Tear in the Open"

Elements of Life

- "Elements of Life"

== Releases Under His Own Name ==
Between 2013 and 2017, Huinink release multiple solo & collab releases under his own name on labels of the Abora Recordings, Armada Music, and Blue Soho Recordings music groups.

Using the artist name "Geert Huinink", he released the solo tracks "Grounding" and "The River and the Desert" on the Abora Chillout.. Also using his own name, he released the collaborations "Natalie", "I'm Not Gonna Fall Behind", "Life a Knife", "Forever", "Desert Wings", and a remix of "Winterburn" on sublabels of Armada Music; released the collaboration "The Kingdom" on Abora Skies; released the collaborations "Worlds Which Break Us" and "Hope" on Abora Ascend; released the collaboration "Empyrean" with American producer New World on Driftmoon Audio (then a sublabel of Abora Recordings)"; released the collaboration "Everbound" with Norwegian producer Afternova on Abora Recordings; and released the collaborations "Ephemere", "Yugen", and "Fields of Forever" on Blue Soho Recordings.

Some of those collaborations achieved global success and recognition. In particular, "The Kingdom", "Worlds Which Break Us", and "Empyrean" (all released on sublabels of Abora Recordings) all won the Future Favorite on Armin van Buuren's A State of Trance radioshow, as did "Natalie" (released on Armada's sublabel Who's Afraid of 138?!) and "Fields of Forever" (on Blue Soho). Each of those tracks were each played multiple times on A State of Trance. Further, "Yugen" was selected for the A State of Trance Year Mix in 2013.

== Singles ==
As Dawnseekers

- "Gothic Dream"
- "Protuberance"
- "Shaman's Wake Up"
- "Twister"

Remixes:

- Art of trance – "Breathe" (Dawnseekers Remix)

As Photon Project

- "Enlightenment"
- "Illumination"
- "The Inside"
- "The Outside"
- "Brainwave"
- "Thoughts"
- "11 Hours"
- "Fly"

Remixes:

- Andain – "Beautiful Things" (Photon Project Remix)
- Nickleson – "Yin" (Photon Project Remix)

As Twenty-Something

- "Mayflower"
- "Morphing Mirror"
- "Sugar rush"

Remixes:

- The Quest – C-sharp (Twenty-Something Remix)

As Headstrong

- "Escalator"
- "Noise 4 Us

As Threesome (With Cor Fijneman)

- "Mohave"
- "Gobi"

As 2 Souls

- "In The Beginning"

As Modus Operandi

- "Sandman"
- "Promise"
- "Suburbia"

As White Russians

- "Dangerous Liaisons"
- "Tortilla Wrap"
- "Navigator "

As Divided

- Phil Collins & Phillip Bailey – Don Diablo Vs. Divided – "Easy Lover" '05

As Geert Huinink, on Armada Music labels:

- "Natalie" with Alex van ReeVe
- "I'm Not Gonna Fall Behind" with Fady & Mina
- "Life a Knife" / "Forever" with Driftmoon and Kim
- "Desert Wings" with Alexandre Bergheau

As Geert Huinink, on Abora Music Group labels:

- "Grounding"
- "The River and the Desert"
- "The Kingdom" with Mike van Fabio
- "Worlds Which Break Us" with Driftmoon and Kim
- "Hope" with Mike van Fabio, Alex van ReeVe, and Kim
- "Empyrean" with New World
- "Everbound" with Afternova

As Geert Huinink, on Blue Soho Recordings:

- "Ephemere" with Alexandre Bergheau
- "Yugen" as part of The Avengers
- "Fields of Forever" with Matt Bukovski

== See also ==
- Magik Six: Live in Amsterdam
- Summerbreeze
- Uplifting trance
- Vincent de Moor
