= So Damn Beautiful =

So Damn Beautiful may refer to:

- So Damn Beautiful (Michael Murphy song)
- So Damn Beautiful (Poloroid song)
