= Just Be =

2004 album by Tiësto

Studio album by Tiësto
- Released: 6 April 2004
- Recorded: 2002–2004
- Genre: Trance
- Length: 78:47
- Label: Magik Muzik; Black Hole Recordings; Nettwerk Records; Nebula Records; Kontor Records
- Producer: Tiësto; DJ Waakop Reijers

Tiësto chronology
Nyana (2003)	Just Be (2004)	Parade of the Athletes (2004)

Singles from Just Be
- 1. "Traffic" Released: 8 October 2003; 2. "Love Comes Again" Released: 8 April 2003; 3. "Just Be" Released: 11 October 2004; 4. "Adagio for Strings" Released: 31 January 2005

Just Be is the second studio album by Dutch DJ Tiësto. It was released on 6 April 2004 in the Netherlands and 15 May 2004 in the United States. The album features BT, Kirsty Hawkshaw, and Aqualung on vocals, as well as a remake of Samuel Barber's "Adagio for Strings". The album's singles were "Love Comes Again", "Traffic", "Just Be" (the title track), and "Adagio for Strings". The track "Sweet Misery" was originally written for Evanescence but it did not meet the deadline for the release of their debut album, Fallen.

== Style ==
The album begins with "Forever Today" which is composed of soft classical sounds of strings before moving into a strong trance beat and bassline later in the 12-minute track. The album's second track, featuring BT, is the second single from the album "Love Comes Again". The song uses Latin percussion sounds which are followed by BT's vocals. The third track is the uplifting "Traffic". Then he introduces his first work with Joanne Lloyd, titled "Sweet Misery", it is a chill out track with dark vocals and flowing synth lines, it is an unexpected break from the usually expected sounds of Tiësto. He continues by performing the title track of his previous album compilation Nyana.

Tiësto's first down tempo track in the album, "UR" features vocals of Matt Hales from Aqualung and was remixed by Junkie XL and released as a single with "A Tear In The Open" as its B-side. Another down tempo track in which Tiësto collaborated along half of Gabriel & Dresden, Josh Gabriel in "Walking on Clouds" and Kirsty Hawkshaw's vocals, the song was also released as an instrumental version. "A Tear In The Open" is played in track eight and was composed by Tiësto, Geert Huinink and Daniël Stewart. The title track "Just Be" features Hawkshaw again and became a successful song as it was included in Gabriel & Dresden's Nip/Tuck: Original TV Soundtrack. Then the final track of the album, "Adagio for Strings" begins with a hard bassline which builds up until the melodic breakdown rises. The sounds of Samuel Barber's "Adagio for Strings" have been featured in movies such as Platoon and on William Orbit's Pieces in a Modern Style. Sound Designer Mike Clark contributed to this album. He made the Access Virus Soundset.

== Critical reception ==
Professional ratings
Review scores
Source	Rating
AllMusic	2.5/5 stars

Upon its release, Just Be received mixed reviews from music critics. Jack Smith of BBC Music gave the album a mixed review, calling the album, "a more concentrated trance session aimed at those expecting to hear a replica of his live DJ set." Smith goes on to say that Tiësto "is giving the people exactly what they want, although at times in so doing he is guilty of sounding a little too clichéd in the process." David Jeffries of AllMusic gave the album 2.5 stars out of 5, stating, "A better album to watch lava lamps slowly flow than for frantically twirling glowsticks, Just Be is as moody as the black-and-white photographs throughout the booklet, until a couple mindless tracks screw it all up." Kevin Hainey of Exclaim! gave the album a negative review, stating, "You couldn't find dance music more thinly ethereal, fluffily uplifting and overtly cheesy if Yanni, John Tesh and Kitaro met up with Chris Sheppard and Vengaboys to record a three-disc Buddha Bar mega-mix."

== Track listing ==
All tracks produced by Tiësto, with additional production by DJ Waakop Reijers.

Standard version
No.	Title	Writer(s)	Length
1.	"Forever Today"	Tiësto; Geert Huinink; Daniël Stewart	11:59
2.	"Love Comes Again" (featuring BT)	Tiësto; BT	8:15
3.	"Traffic"	Tiësto	5:30
4.	"Sweet Misery"	Tiësto; Dan Muckala; Jo Lloyd; Jon Ingoldsby	7:29
5.	"Nyana"	Tiësto	6:44
6.	"UR" (featuring Aqualung)	Matt Hales; Tiësto; Naomi Striemer; Michael Scherchen	6:00
7.	"Walking On Clouds" (featuring Kirsty Hawkshaw)	Tiësto; Josh Gabriel; Kirsty Hawkshaw	7:27
8.	"A Tear in the Open"	Tiësto; Huinink; Stewart	9:23
9.	"Just Be" (featuring Kirsty Hawkshaw)	Tiësto; Judie Tzuke; James Wiltshire; Hawkshaw	8:45
10.	"Adagio for Strings"	Samuel Barber	7:23

Just Be – Press Kit
No.	Title	Length
1.	"Just Be (album)"	78:47
2.	"Press Photos"	?
3.	"Love Comes Again (video)"	3:23
4.	"Tiësto In Concert (DVD)"	3:20:00

Bonus Disc Avex Asia Inc.
No.	Title	Length
1.	"Traffic (Radio Edit)"	2:55
2.	"Traffic (Original Mix)"	6:59
3.	"Traffic (Max Walder Remix)"	7:35
4.	"Traffic (DJ Montana 12" Edit)"	7:41
5.	"Love Comes Again (Radio Edit)"	3:16
6.	"Love Comes Again (Mark Norman Remix)"	7:23
7.	"Lethal Industry (DJ Richard & Johnny Bass Remix)"	6:39

Limited Edition DVD Kontor Records
No.	Title	Length
1.	"Nyana (video)"	?
2.	"Traffic"	?
3.	"Love Comes Again (video)"	?
4.	"Interview & Photos"	?
5.	"Traffic (DJ Montana Full Length Edit)"	7:47

Limited Edition Dance Planet
No.	Title	Length
1.	"Love Comes Again (video)"	3:23
2.	"Traffic (video)"	2:58

Sample credits

- "Traffic" contains a sample from the track "Psykofuk" by Sean Deason.
- "A Tear in the Open" contains a vocal sample from the track "Vocal Planet" by Spectrasonics.

== Credits ==
- "A Tear in the Open" Composer(s): Geert Huinink & Daniël Stewart. Vocal samples from "Vocal Planet" by Spectrasonics, originally a folk song called Ailein duinn that was first featured in the movie Rob Roy.
- "Forever Today" Composer(s): Geert Huinink & Daniël Stewart
- "Love Comes Again" Producer(s): BT
  - BT appears courtesy of Binary Acoustics.
- "Traffic" samples from "Psykofuk" by Sean Deason.
- "Sweet Misery" Composer(s): Dan Muckala, Joanne Lloyd & Jon Ingoldby
- "UR" Composer(s): Matt Hales, Michael Scherchen & Naomi Striemer
  - Aqualung appears courtesy of First Column Management.
- "Walking on Clouds" Producer(s): Josh Gabriel & Kirsty Hawkshaw
  - Josh Gabriel appears courtesy of Nettwerk Management and Kirsty Hawkshaw appears courtesy of Impro Management.
- "Just Be" Composer(s): Judie Tzuke, James Wiltshire & Kirsty Hawkshaw
- "Adagio for Strings" Composer(s): Samuel Barber

== Charts ==
=== Weekly charts ===
Chart (2004–2005)	Peak position
Australian Albums (ARIA)	201
Australian Dance Albums (ARIA)	22
Belgian Albums (Ultratop Flanders)	2
Belgian Albums (Ultratop Wallonia)	96
Canadian Albums (Nielsen SoundScan)	73
Dutch Albums (Album Top 100)	1
German Albums (Offizielle Top 100)	51
Greek Albums (IFPI)	6
Hungarian Albums (MAHASZ)	21
Scottish Albums (OCC)	45
UK Albums (OCC)	54
UK Dance Albums (OCC)	26
UK Independent Albums (OCC)	4
US Heatseekers Albums (Billboard)	11
US Top Dance Albums (Billboard)	3

Chart (2007)	Peak position
UK Dance Albums (OCC)	11

=== Year-end charts ===
Chart (2004)	Position
Belgian Albums (Ultratop Flanders)	28
Dutch Albums (Album Top 100)	21
US Top Dance/Electronic Albums (Billboard)	16

== Certifications ==
Region	Certification	Certified units/sales
Belgium (BRMA)	Gold	25,000^{*}
Greece (IFPI Greece)	Gold	10,000^{^}
Netherlands (NVPI)	Platinum	80,000^{^}
United Kingdom (BPI)	Silver	60,000^{*}
^{*} Sales figures based on certification alone.^{^} Shipments figures based on certification alone.

== Release history ==
Region	Date	Label	Format	Catalog
Netherlands	14 May 2004	Magik Muzik	CD; album	Magik Muzik CD 03
Netherlands	19 June 2007	Magik Muzik	4 x vinyl; LP; limited edition; album	Magik Muzik LP 07
Netherlands	June 2004	Magik Muzik	4 x vinyl; LP; limited edition; album; colored; transparent	Magik Muzik LP 03
United Kingdom	17 May 2004	Nebula	CD; album	NEBCD9010
United Kingdom	14 May 2004	Nebula	2 x vinyl; 12"	NEBT 9010
United Kingdom	14 May 2004	Nebula	2 x vinyl; 12"	NEBTX 9010
United States	1 June 2004	Nettwerk America	CD; album	0 6700 30364 2 9
United States	1 June 2004	Nettwerk America	4 x vinylLP; limited edition	0 6700 30378 1 5
Taiwan	20 April 2004	Avex Asia Ltd.	2 x CD; album	AVTCD-95757
Taiwan	20 April 2004	Avex Asia Ltd.	2 x CD; album	AVICD60322/3
Spain	20 May 2004	Vale Music	CD; album	VLCD 297-1
Japan	16 April 2004	Superb Tracks	2 x CD; album; copy protected	AVCD-17457/B
Switzerland	June 2004	Sirup	CD; album	MV-SIR903562
Romania	14 May 2004	NRG!A	CD; album	3570-2
Australia	7 June 2004	Bang On!	CD; album	BANGCD034
Germany and Europe	2004	Kontor	CD; limited edition	Kontor379
Germany and Europe	2004	Kontor	CD; limited edition; DVD	Kontor379
Germany and Europe	2004	Edel Records (Germany)	CD; album	0154992 KON
Poland	2004	Magic Records	CD; album	982013-2
Russia	2004	Dance Planet Ltd.	CD; album; enhanced; dance planet edition	DPCD025-04
Germany (only)	2004	Kontor; Black Hole	CD; enhanced; DVD; DVD-Video; PAL	none; Black Hole DVD 02/1

== Just Be: Train Tour ==
The Just Be: Train Tour is a Tiësto tour in support of his album Just Be. The event began in Breda, on Thursday, May 20, Ascension Day; Tiësto was honored by the mayor of The Hague as an officer of the Royal-Nassau. At 11:00 AM, everyone is on board and Tiësto's special train leaves from platform 1 to the first stop, Eindhoven. He is driven by a car with blacked out windows and escorted by two policemen on motorbikes, then he arrives at a stage built on a huge trailer of a truck housing with a huge sound system. Disc jockey Barry Paff from Radio 538 is says Tiësto will be there in five minutes. He finally appeared on stage and began spinning "Traffic", followed by his first single from Just Be, "Love Comes Again". He finishes his presentation and goes back to the train station toward his next stop in Utrecht. Utrecht is a small town for press purposes only, no one thought that he would play in there, but some people began to gather, as if the rumors were being spread, even though people started to realize about what was going on, Tiësto still played. Then he went back to the station to his final destination, Amsterdam. Some parts of the train were mini-discos complete with a bar and a sound system while others were relaxing zones to sit down and chat with other fans. It also makes for great pump up music. Amsterdam is also the location for the last promotional stop and the official release party which will take place later that same night at the Heineken Music Hall. It's a venue that was nominated for the highest prize in the concert industry for the third consecutive time that year. Tiësto hosts his official release party which featured a set along with a special live PA by Kirsty Hawkshaw, and support from Black Hole Recordings' deejay's Cor Fijneman, Ton T.B., Mark Norman, Montana and Le Blanc.

== See also ==
- Just Be: Remixed
