= Adagio for Strings (disambiguation) =

Adagio for Strings is a 1936 orchestral work by Samuel Barber.

Adagio for Strings may also refer to:

- "Adagio for Strings", a 2000 version of Barber's work by William Orbit from the 2000 album Pieces in a Modern Style
  - the radio version of Orbit's piece, remixed by Ferry Corsten
- "Adagio for Strings" (Tiësto song), a 2004 version of Barber's work by Tiësto

== See also ==
- Adagio in G minor, a 1958 work by Remo Giazotto, based on a fragment that he attributed to Tomaso Albinoni
