= Drum roll =

Percussion technique

Visual/audio example of the drum rudiment single stroke four.

The rhythm of a snare drum roll may be notated explicitly or as three-line tremolo.

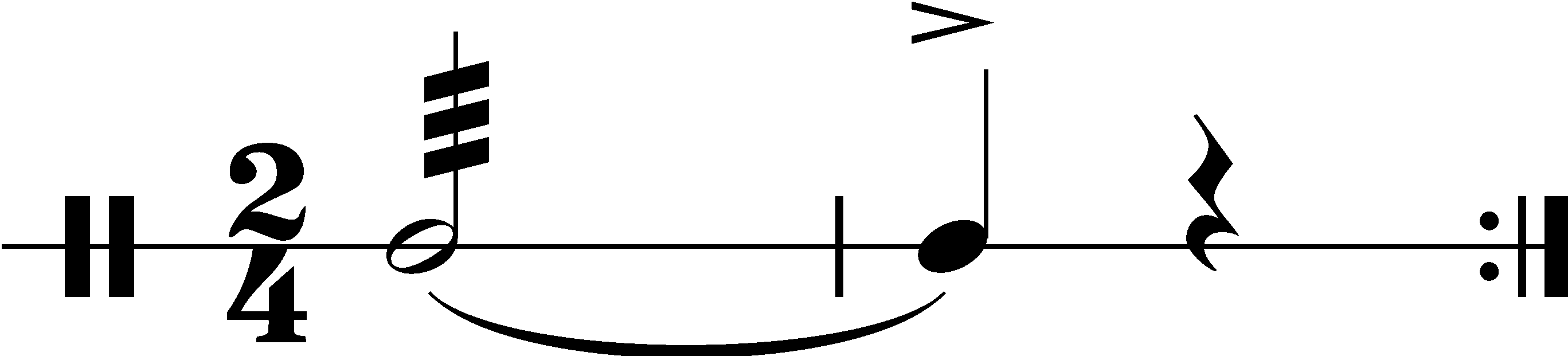

Listen

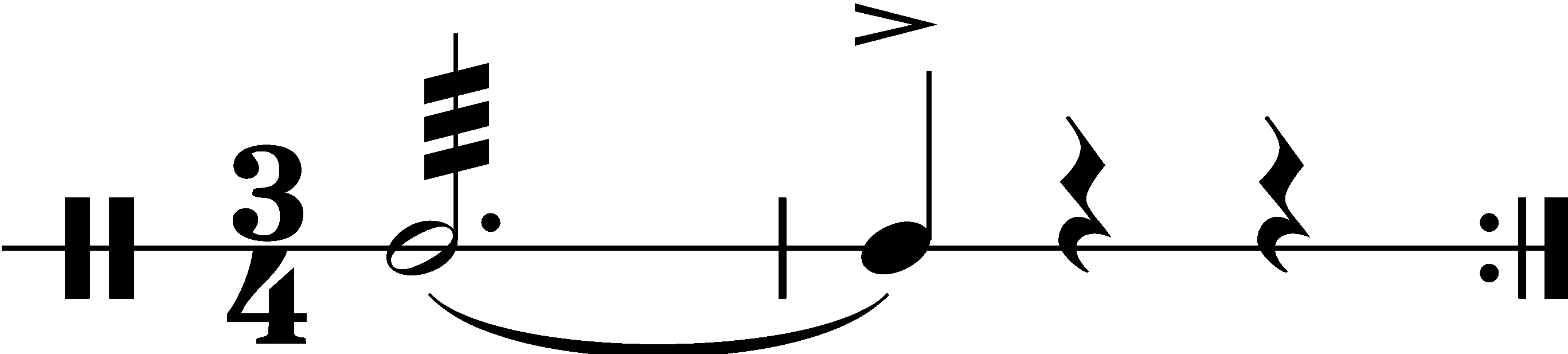

Listen

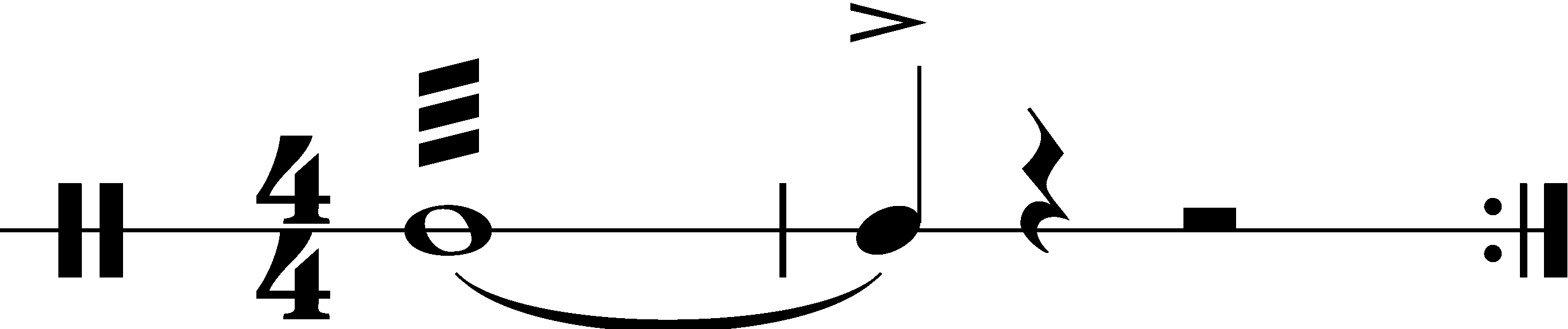

Listen

Example practice rolls

A drum roll (or roll for short) is a technique used by percussionists to produce a sustained sound for the duration of a written note.

All drum figures are based upon three fundamental beats, technically called roll, single stroke, and flam...Sustentation is accomplished upon wind instruments by blowing into the instrument; it is accomplished upon the violin and the allied instruments by drawing the bow across the string; it is accomplished upon the drum and allied percussion instruments by the roll.

THE SNARE DRUM ROLL.

The roll consists of an even reiteration of beats sufficiently rapid to prohibit rhythmic analysis. To produce an impression of sustentation, these beats must be absolutely even both in power and in sequence. Uneven beats in a roll destroy the impression of sustentation. Evenness is then the primary quality to strive for in roll; speed is the secondary quality to strive for.

There are two possible ways of producing an absolutely even sequence: (1) hand alternation of single stroke and (2) hand alternation of double strokes...The snare drum roll is produced by hand alternation of double strokes.

The "open roll" is produced by [initially] slow hand alternation. Two strokes in each hand alternately are produced by wrist movement and each beat should follow its predecessor in clock-like precision.

— Carl E. Gardner (1919)

== Types ==
=== Snare drum roll ===
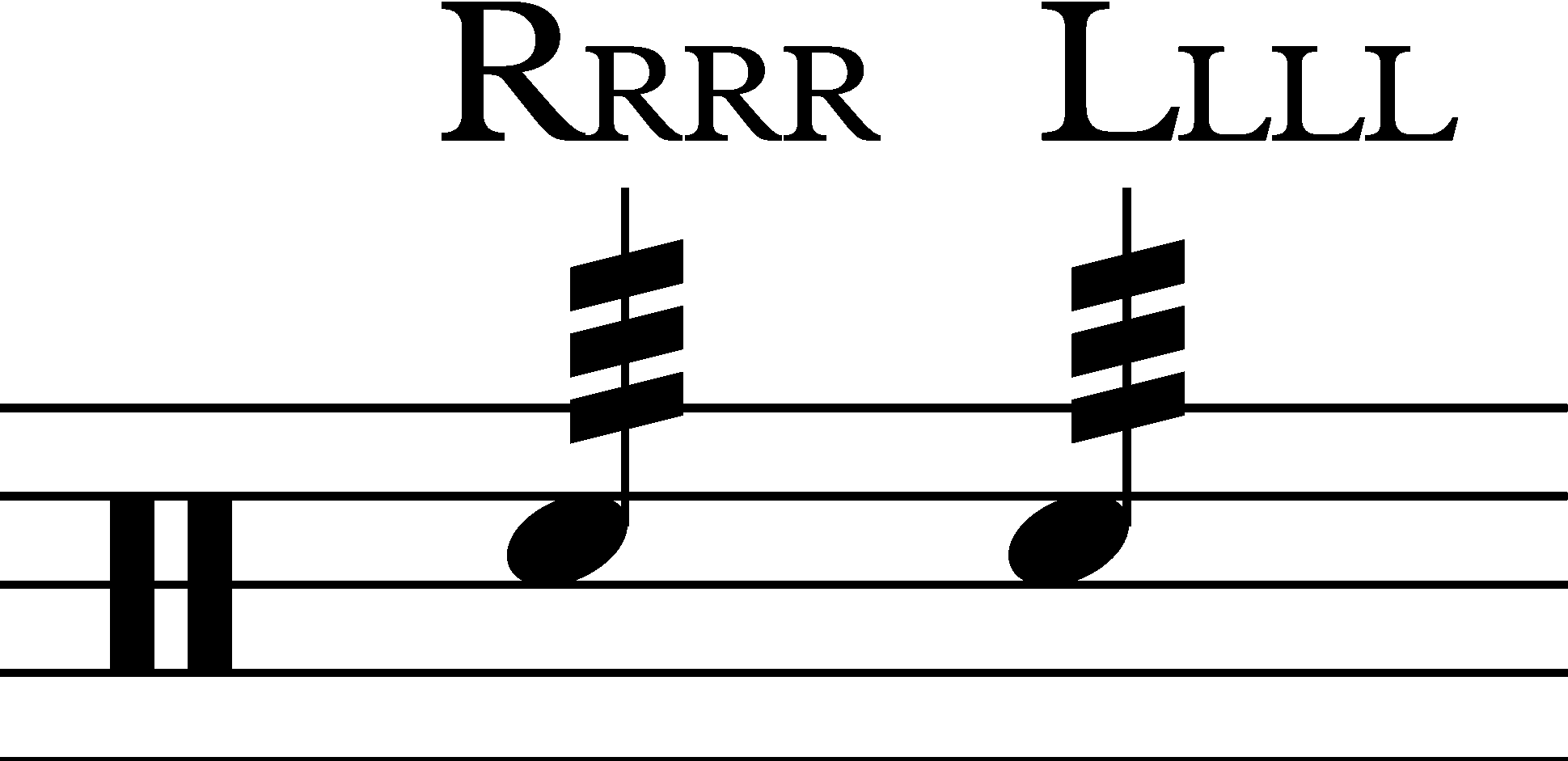
Bounce stroke Listen

A common snare drum roll is the closed roll. The closed concert roll (orchestral roll, buzz roll, or press roll) is performed by creating 3 (or more) equal sounding bounces on each hand alternating right to left, repeatedly and quickly. The aim of a closed roll is to reproduce the effect of a sustained note on an instrument which inherently produces a short, staccato sound. Because a multiple bounce stroke on a drum head loses energy, and volume, with each successive bounce, it is necessary to use special tactics and techniques to mitigate the loss of sound and cause the repeated notes to sound even. This involves the arm, the wrist, and the fingers. One way to mitigate the loss of sound is to overlap the 3rd bounce from one hand with the first bounce of the next in the manner of a flam tap, only much faster and smaller. The loud first bounce occurring closer to the quiet 3rd bounce from the preceding hand give the illusion that the bounces have a more even volume.

There are many interpretations of concert rolls and while the variations result in a similar rolling sound, there are subtle audible differences. One major point of differentiation between rolling techniques is between metered and unmetered rolls. Metered rolls require the players arms and wrists to play in time with the beat of the music and so a regular subdivision, such as 8th note triplets, 16th notes, or 16th note triplets must be chosen and maintained. The drawback of metered rolls is that the ideal rolling speed (for the player, the room, the sticks, and the instrument) may lie between exact subdivisions, depending on the tempo, and the sound quality may vary by tempo. The benefit is that it makes all the rolls fit neatly into the music in time and is easier to count. Unmetered rolls require the player to perform the best possible sounding roll they can, whether or not the arm movements correspond to the musical tempo. The drawback to this approach is that the player must count the beats of the music independently to, and in complete disregard of, the speed of the roll and the corresponding arm motion. The benefit is that the roll sounds optimal and smooth at any tempo. The metered closed roll should not be confused with the open or measured roll, as described below.

Examples of drum rudiments that are similar to, or precisely like, a concert closed roll include:

- American - Multiple bounce roll, triple stroke roll, and crushed ruff
- German - Druckruf
- Scotch - Buzz roll, stroked rolls 5 through 25 (metered closed rolls in Scottish tradition), and trizzlet
- Dutch - Ra stroke
- Mexican - Rau Tau and Redoble
- Spanish - Redoble de Zumbido
- Bajoaragonés - Los Rufaos
- Eporedian (Ivrea, Italy) - Rullo

The open roll ("double-stroke roll" or "long roll") is played with double strokes alternating between the left and right hands. Using a forearm stroke for the first and the fingers for the second stroke, the 2 strokes can be made to sound identical. This produces a near-continuous sound when the technique is mastered. In rudimental drumming, open rolls, consisting of double strokes, are often measured out to a specific number of strokes. A 3 stroke roll is the shortest possible open double stroke roll, but is commonly referred to by the specific name "Drag," "Ruff," or "Half Drag." Typically, any roll with an odd number of strokes is played with a single accent and any roll with an even number of strokes is played with 2 accents. This patterns holds for the 5 Stroke, 6 Stroke, 7 Stroke, 9 Stroke, 10 Stroke, 11 Stroke, 13 Stroke, 15 Stroke, and 17 Stroke Rolls of the PAS 40 rudiments. Note that some numbers between 5 and 17 are missing. These additional rolls are possible and are taught in modern hybrid drumming and in older pre-NARD rudimental systems, as well as those from other countries, notably the Basel and Scotch cultures. For example, the 8 Stroke Roll is present in the Moeller Book from 1925 but is lost in later publications. The 4 Stroke, 8 Stroke, 12 Stroke, 14 Stroke, and 16 Stroke are rare but all exist in official published sources. The Scotch Pipe Band style has a rudimental roll up to 25 strokes. This provides the drummer with a consistent set of rolls from 3 to 17 plus the 25, with any other number being an extrapolation from this system.

The snare drum was the standard for military communication from about 1700 to the 1860s, and a list of British army drum calls from 1800 included the long roll as a call to form a square. During the American Civil War the long roll called the troops to assemble and signaled an attack.

Again the long roll of the drummers,
Again the attacking cannon, mortars,
Again to my listening ears the cannon responsive.

— Walt Whitman, Song of Myself

Other than the open roll, there are many other rolls and rudiments that sound like rolls when they are played fast enough (like the freehand technique or single paradiddle).

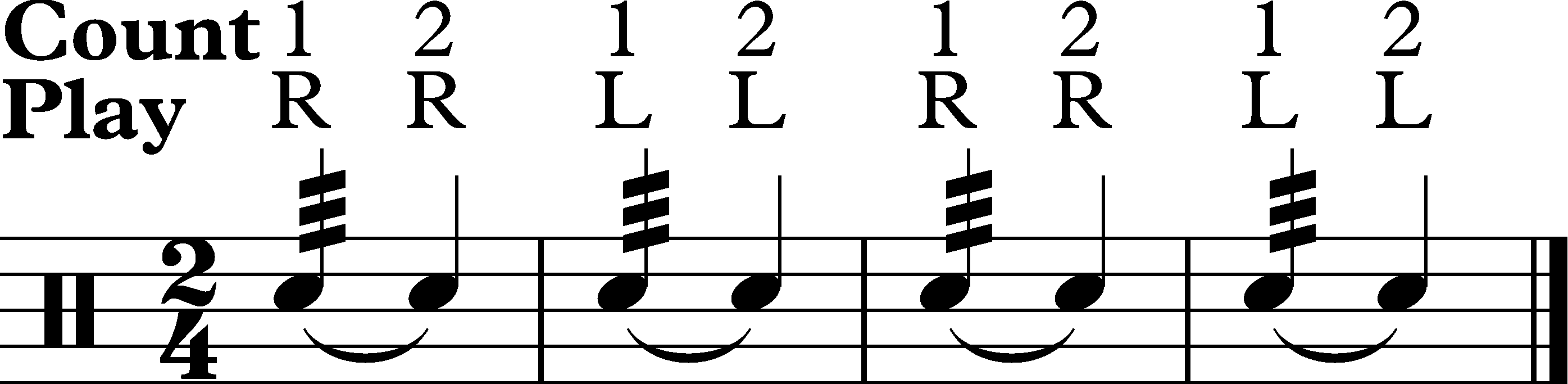
Quarter note roll Listen

In the table below, lower-case letters represent grace notes (drags, flams etc.) and hyphens represent rests.

Rudiment	Sticking pattern
Single-stroke roll	RLRLRLRLRL
Double-stroke roll	RRLLRRLL
Triple-stroke roll (or French Roll)	RRRLLLRRRLLL
Single paradiddle	RLRR LRLL
Double paradiddle	RLRLRR LRLRLL
Five-stroke roll	RRLLR LLRRL
Seven-stroke roll	RRLLRRL- LLRRLLR

Also, the six-stroke roll is often used in snare solo and marching percussion situations and is a favorite for jazz and rock drummers. It has four variations; each note is equal in length and consists of two double strokes (RRLL) and two singles (R L). The strokes are most commonly taught as (RLLRRL).

French and Dutch drumming include several variations on rolls with an uneven number of strokes between the hands. For example, the French Bâton Melée, or mixed stick, can be played in repeating combinations of 3: RRL, LLR, RLL, or LRR.

=== Timpani roll ===
Rolls on timpani are almost exclusively single-stroked. Due to the instruments' resonance, a fairly open roll is usually used, although the exact rate at which a roll is played depends greatly on the acoustic conditions, the size of the drum, the pitch to which is it tuned and the sticks being used. Higher pitches on timpani require a faster roll to maintain a sustained sound; some timpanists choose to use a buzz roll on higher notes at lower volumes; although there is no definite rule, most timpanists who employ this technique do so on a high "G", and above. In the end, it often comes down to the discretion of the timpanist.

=== Keyboard roll ===
These are similar to the timpani rolls in that they are done nearly the same way and are both single-stroked. Yarn mallets usually can be rolled much more easily on a marimba than plastic ones can be on a xylophone, because the extra reverberation of a marimba will mask the silent gaps between strokes. For this reason, the rolls can be much slower and still effective. But for xylophone and orchestra bells a much swifter roll is required, especially for rubber or plastic mallets. A brass mallet used with orchestra bells will add extra vibration to aid in the smoothing of the sound.

To get these faster rolls, percussionists (keyboard, snare and timpani) all often use the muscles of their fingers instead of those of the wrists. The fingers have a shorter rotation length and can move faster with less effort than the wrist.

=== Fulcrum roll/Gravity roll/Freehand roll ===
The fulcrum roll, or freehand roll, is a roll in which the rim of the drum momentarily replaces the original finger-created fulcrum. Thus is qualifies as a dual-fulcrum or multiple-fulcrum stroke. The initial stroke creates contact with the drum head in a relatively normal manner. Immediately subsequent, at the bottom or end of the down stroke motion, the rim is contacted approximately 1 inch in front of the thumb and forefinger. Contact with the rim rocks the front portion of the stick upwards from the point of contact with the rim. At this moment, the wrist is located just below the rim and the bead is a couple inches above the head. From the bottom of the down-stroke, the hand is then raised for the upstroke. While the hand raises, the bead of the stick is returning toward the head after its bounce off the rim. As the raising hand and falling bead reach the same height, the head is struck for the second time. This creates two beats contacting the drum head out of a single stroke motion of the arm. The precise moment of contact with the rim momentarily creates a new fulcrum at the drum stick's physical point of contact with the rim. This is one of the easier and more commonly used forms of a "one handed roll". When executed with precision, this doubling of contact means 16th notes can be played while the arm only strokes 8th notes, or 32nd notes can be played while stroking only 16th notes. The technique is also known amongst many drummers as the gravity blast, though gravity is not required as the technique can be performed inverted, sideways, or in a gravity free environment.

== Notation ==
A tremolo in percussion indicates a roll on any percussion instrument, whether tuned or untuned. A tremolo is notated using strokes, or slashes, through the stem of a note. In the case of whole notes, the strokes or slashes are drawn above or below the note, where the stem would be if there were one. For the case of a snare drum and some other percussion instruments, rolls may be indicated by individual notes or with the use of tremolos, depending on the sheet music's notation.

In percussion, three types of tremolos may be seen in sheet music; a tremolo with a single, double, or triple slash going through the stem:

A single slash indicates a diddle, or two double strokes from a single hand, that subdivides the note in two. RR or LL

A double slash indicates two diddles, or two double strokes from each hand, that subdivides the note in four. RRLL or LLRR

A triple slash indicates four diddles, playing two double strokes twice from each hand, that subdivides the note into eight. RRLLRRLL or LLRRLLRR

In a 4/4 time signature, a triple slash quarter note would entail playing double strokes for two eighth notes with a single slash each, or four sixteenth notes RRLL or LLRR. A double slash eighth note would entail playing double strokes for four sixteenth notes RRLL or LLRR. A single slash sixteenth note would entail playing one pair of double stroke thirty-second notes RR or LL. In the case of a half note or whole note, it's common to play alternating double stroke sixteenth notes for the duration of the note.

Depending on the sheet music, individual notes with labeled sticking patterns can also be rolls. These rolls can be single stroke rolls, double stroke rolls, triple stroke rolls, or any multiple bounce roll variation. Rolls that don't use tremolos typically incorporate different articulations and dynamics, although this is not always the case.

== See also ==
- Banjo roll
- Snare rush
- Tambourine roll
- Triangle roll
