= Snare rush =

Impossibly fast drum rolls

Snare rush example
Snare drum playing a breve then a measure each of whole to 1024th notes at = 387.

Snare rush is a term often used in electro culture to refer to impossibly fast rolls. A snare rush can vary in tempo considerably, from 16th notes even to 2048th notes. At that sort of speed, the effect is a buzzing sound, but with a detectable pitch, so some artists vary the repeat rate, and can even play a tune. One example is the last 18 seconds of "Ghetto Body Buddy" by Venetian Snares, where the theme from Sesame Street is played using only extremely fast snare rushes. The defining characteristic of a snare rush, as opposed to a roll, is the sheer virtuosity it would take for a physical drummer to play a successful one. As such, almost all snare rushes are computer-programmed and can be used with bass drums, tom-toms, and cymbals to intensify the effect. They are often used as fills, alongside complex programmed breakbeats. Snare rushes are also often run through analog or DSP effects together with variations in volume, such as a filters or pitch shifting. They are common in trance music, hard techno, gabber music, oldschool jungle, IDM, drill 'n bass, breakcore and glitch music.

If human pitch perception begins at 20 Hz (1200 vibrations per minute), then 64th notes become pitched at = 75 bpm.

== See also ==
- Drum machine
- Extratone
- Granular synthesis
- Music sequencer
- Stutter edit
