= Poloroid =

British music trio, solo-artist (1998–2004)

- Born: Danielle Rowe
- Origin: Essex, London
- Genres: Trip hop, ambient, electronic
- Occupation: Singer-songwriter
- Instruments: Vocals, guitar
- Years active: c.1998–2001 (as a trio), 2001–2004 (as a solo artist)
- Labels: Telstar, Decode

Poloroid is a former stage name of Essex-born singer-songwriter Danielle "Dan" Rowe, best known for her 2003 single "So Damn Beautiful". Originally referring to a trio, the name "Poloroid" was adopted by Rowe for her solo material in 2001, following the death of her bandmate John Horrocks. Her song "So Damn Beautiful" was featured on compilation albums, such as Global Underground 012: Buenos Aires, and was also used in the soundtrack to an episode of American drama Nip/Tuck. After her record label, Telstar Records, was dissolved in 2004, Rowe retired the "Poloroid" moniker and formed a new band named No Silence.

== History ==
Poloroid were originally a trio consisting of Danielle Rowe, Lee Milleare and John Horrocks. After Horrocks committed suicide in May 2001, Rowe continued to use the Poloroid moniker as a solo artist. Her song "So Damn Beautiful", which she had co-written with both Milleare and Horrocks, was first brought to the attention of nightclubs after British disc jockey Dave Seaman included it on the mix album Global Underground 012: Bueno Aires in 1999. Because of this attention for the song, Rowe was invited to perform a live set for BBC Radio 1 in Ibiza. As well as interest from the clubs, the track was also used in the UK as part of soundtracks to various victories of the England national football team, such as their 5–1 defeat of Germany in 2001 and their 1–0 victory over Argentina in 2002.

"So Damn Beautiful"
Poloroid's biggest chart hit was described as "a truly haunting song" by musicOMH.

"So Damn Beautiful" was officially released by Telstar Records in the UK on 29 September 2003, in a radically remixed form by trance DJs Dogzilla. The song was playlisted on BBC Radio 1's C list and received airplay, where Australian singer Holly Valance expressed a like for the song on The Chris Moyles Show. "So Damn Beautiful" peaked at number 28 on the UK Singles Chart and was Poloroid's biggest chart hit. It was also used in the episode "Nanette Babcock" of the American drama Nip/Tuck and was included on the soundtrack album Nip/Tuck: Original TV Soundtrack. On reviewing the album, UK-based website musicOMH described the track as "lovely" and called it "a truly haunting song".

Telstar Records was declared bankrupt in 2004, three days before the release of Poloroid's debut album. As a result of this, Rowe decided to retire the name Poloroid and chose instead to form a new band named No Silence, with whom she currently performs.

== Discography ==
=== Singles ===
| Year | Title | Chart peak positions | |
| Year | Title | UK | UK dance |
|---|---|---|---|
| 2003 | "So Damn Beautiful" | 28 | 1 |

=== Other appearances ===
The following songs have been officially released, but do not feature on an album by Poloroid.

| Year | Song | Album | Notes |
|---|---|---|---|
| 2002 | "Count on You" | Hed Kandi: Winter Chill 06.02 | Compilation album |
| 2004 | "Safety" | Hed Kandi: Winter Chill 06.03 | Compilation album |
