= Traffic (Tiësto song) =

- Traffic single cover

Single by Tiësto

from the album Just Be
- A-side: "Love Comes Again" (2004)
- Released: 8 October 2003
- Recorded: 2003
- Genre: Techno
- Length: 7:01
- Label: Magik Muzik; Black Hole; Nebula; Independence; Playground; Electropolis; Bang On!
- Songwriter: Tijs Verwest
- Producer: Tiësto

Tiësto singles chronology
"In My Memory" (2002)	"Traffic" (2003)	"Love Comes Again" (2004)

Traffic Remixes
- Included "Traffic (Montana Re-Edit)"

Music video
- "Traffic" on YouTube

"Traffic" is a track single which appeared in the album Just Be and Parade of the Athletes by Dutch DJ Tiësto. The track contains samples of Sean Deason's track "Psykofuk". When the album Just Be was released, his third single "Love Comes Again" was featured with it, "Traffic" turned into a B-side after having great success in Tiësto's concerts and having a music video made which was released in its original form as well as its radio edit version. It is the first instrumental track to reach the top spot in his homeland of the Netherlands in 23 years. Many DJs did remixes for "Traffic". The track is recorded at 136 BPM.

An official remake by the duo twoloud was released on Musical Freedom in December 2013.

Additional remakes by Jewelz & Sparks and Bassjackers were also released on Musical Freedom in July 2020 and April 2023 respectively.

== Formats and track listings ==
=== CD and 12" vinyl ===
Netherlands, Scandinavia, and United Kingdom maxi-single

1. "Traffic" (Radio Edit) – 2:54
2. "Traffic" (Original) – 7:01
3. "Traffic" (Max Walder Mix) – 7:34

=== "Love Comes Again" and "Traffic" ===
Australia 12" vinyl

1. "Love Comes Again" (Original 12" Version) – 8:07
2. "Love Comes Again" (Mark Norman Remix) – 7:20
3. "Traffic" (Montana Re-Edit) – 7:39
4. "Traffic" (Max Walder Mix) – 7:34

Australia maxi-single

1. "Love Comes Again" (Radio Edit) – 3:15
2. "Love Comes Again" (Original 12" Version) – 8:07
3. "Love Comes Again" (Mark Norman Remix) – 7:20
4. "Traffic" (DJ Montana 12" Edit) – 7:39
5. "Traffic" (Original Mix) – 6:57
6. "Traffic" (Max Walder Mix) – 7:32

== Charts ==
=== Weekly charts ===
Chart (2003–04)	Peak position
Belgium (Ultratop 50 Flanders)	3
Hungary (Dance Top 40)	7
Netherlands (Dutch Top 40)	2
Netherlands (Single Top 100)	1
Scottish Singles Sales (Official Charts)	38
UK Singles (Official Charts)	48
UK Dance (Official Charts)	3
US Billboard Hot Dance Club Play	25

=== Year-end charts ===
Chart (2003)	Position
Belgium (Ultratop Flanders)	21
Netherlands (Dutch Top 40)	9
Netherlands (Single Top 100)	15

=== Decade-end charts ===
Chart (2000–09)	Position
Netherlands (Single Top 100)	79

== Official versions ==
- Just Be Album Version – (5:24)
- Parade of the Athletes Album Version – (4:13)
- Max Walder Mix – (7:34)
- DJ Montana 12" Edit – (7:49)
- DJ Montana Re-Edit – (5:11)
- Original Mix – (6:57)
- Radio Edit – (2:54)
- Sied van Riel Remix – (5:55)
- Kryder & Dave Winnel Remix - (5:13)
- Maddix Remix - (4:03)
- Richard Durand 2003 Remix - (6:53)
- Richard Durand 2016 Remix (6:40)

== Release history ==
Region	Date	Label	Format	Catalog
Netherlands	22 September 2003	Magik Muzik	CD; maxi	Magik Muzik 814-2
Netherlands	22 September 2003	Magik Muzik	CD; maxi	Magik Muzik 814-1
Netherlands	21 October 2003	Magik Muzik	Vinyl; 12"	Magik Muzik 814-5
Netherlands	March 2004	Magik Muzik	Vinyl; 12"; picture disc; limited edition	Magik Muzik 814-6
Scandinavia	2003	Playground Music Scandinavia	CD; maxi	Magik Muzik 814-2
France	2003	Independence Records	Vinyl; 12"	IR 0357
United Kingdom	29 September 2003	Nebula	Vinyl; 12"	NEBT052
United Kingdom	2003	Nebula	Vinyl; 12"	NEBTX052
United Kingdom	October 2003	Nebula	CD; maxi	NEBCD052
Spain	8 October 2003	Electropolis	Vinyl; 12"	VLMX 1472-3
Australia	April 2004	Bang On!	Vinyl; 12"	BANG 056
Australia	May 2004	Bang On!	CD; maxi	BANG0096
