= IZotope =

American audio technology company

- Industry: Software industry/SIP licensing
- Founded: 1 January 2001
- Headquarters: Cambridge, Massachusetts, United States
- Area served: Worldwide
- Products: Audio middleware
- Parent: Native Instruments (2023–2026); Boris FX (2026–)
- Website: www.izotope.com

iZotope, Inc. is an audio technology company based in Cambridge, Massachusetts, United States. iZotope develops professional audio software for audio recording, mixing, broadcast, sound design, and mastering which can be used in wide range of digital audio workstation (DAW) programs. In addition, iZotope creates and licenses audio DSP technology including noise reduction, sample rate conversion, dithering, time stretching, and audio enhancement to hardware and software companies in the consumer and pro audio industries.

In 2023, iZotope was acquired by Native Instruments. In 2026, after Native Instruments was acquired by InMusic, iZotope was acquired by Boris FX.

== Software ==
Product name	Release date	Description
Alloy 2	August 14, 2012	channel strip plugin with EQ, Transient Shaper, Dynamics, Exciter, Limiter, and De-Esser
ANR-B	May 10, 2007	iZotope's only hardware unit — adaptive realtime noise reduction for broadcast audio
BreakTweaker	January 23, 2014	drum sculpting and beat sequencing machine that blurs the line between rhythm and melody
DDLY Dynamic Delay	February 9, 2016	responds to track musical dynamics to create unique delays
Insight	November 13, 2012	CALM Act compliant essential metering suite
Insight 2	September 13, 2018	CALM Act compliant essential metering suite
Iris 2	November 19, 2014	spectral sampling re-synthesizer featuring spectral selection tools
Nectar	November, 2010	vocal production suite
Nectar 2	October 18, 2013	vocal production suite
Nectar 3	October 16, 2018	vocal production suite
Neoverb	October 2, 2020	reverb plug-in that combines industry-leading Exponential Audio technology with an intuitive, AI-powered workflow
Neutron	October 5, 2016	audio mixing plug-in suite including advanced analysis and metering
Neutron 2	October 5, 2017	audio mixing plug-in suite including advanced analysis and metering
Neutron 3	June 6, 2019	audio mixing plug-in suite including advanced analysis and metering
Neutron 4	June 2, 2022	audio mixing plug-in suite including advanced analysis and metering
Ozone 7	November 3, 2015	mastering suite with equalizer and dynamic eq, dynamics processing, exciter, spectral shaping processor, imager, maximizer, track referencing system and mastering assistant
Ozone 8	October 5, 2017	mastering suite with equalizer and dynamic eq, dynamics processing, exciter, spectral shaping processor, imager, maximizer, track referencing system and mastering assistant
Ozone 9	October 3, 2019	mastering suite with equalizer and dynamic eq, dynamics processing, exciter, spectral shaping processor, imager, maximizer, track referencing system and mastering assistant
Ozone 10	September 13, 2022	mastering suite with equalizer and dynamic eq, dynamics processing, exciter, spectral shaping processor, imager, maximizer, track referencing system and mastering assistant
RX 6	April 20, 2017	audio restoration suite
RX 7	September 13, 2018	audio restoration suite
RX 8	September 2, 2020	audio restoration suite
RX 9	October 14, 2021	audio restoration suite
RX 10	September 7, 2022	audio restoration suite
RX 11	May 14, 2024	audio restoration suite
Stutter Edit	January 13, 2011	sample stutter effects and slicing
Stutter Edit 2	June 24, 2020	sample stutter effects and slicing
Tonal Balance Control	October 5, 2017	visual analysis tool measuring the distribution of energy across frequency spectrum, comparing audio to program-specific or custom-created targets
Tonal Balance Control 2	May 5, 2020	visual analysis tool measuring the distribution of energy across frequency spectrum, comparing audio to program-specific or custom-created targets
Trash 2	November 19, 2012	64-bit modeling of guitar amplifiers, distortions, delays and filters
Vinyl	February 1, 2001	record simulation and lo-fi effect
Vocalsynth 2	May 23, 2018	Color and shape vocals to the point of unrecognizable, using vocoder, talkbox, and other features. Includes a full suite of stompbox-style studio effects.

=== Mobile applications ===
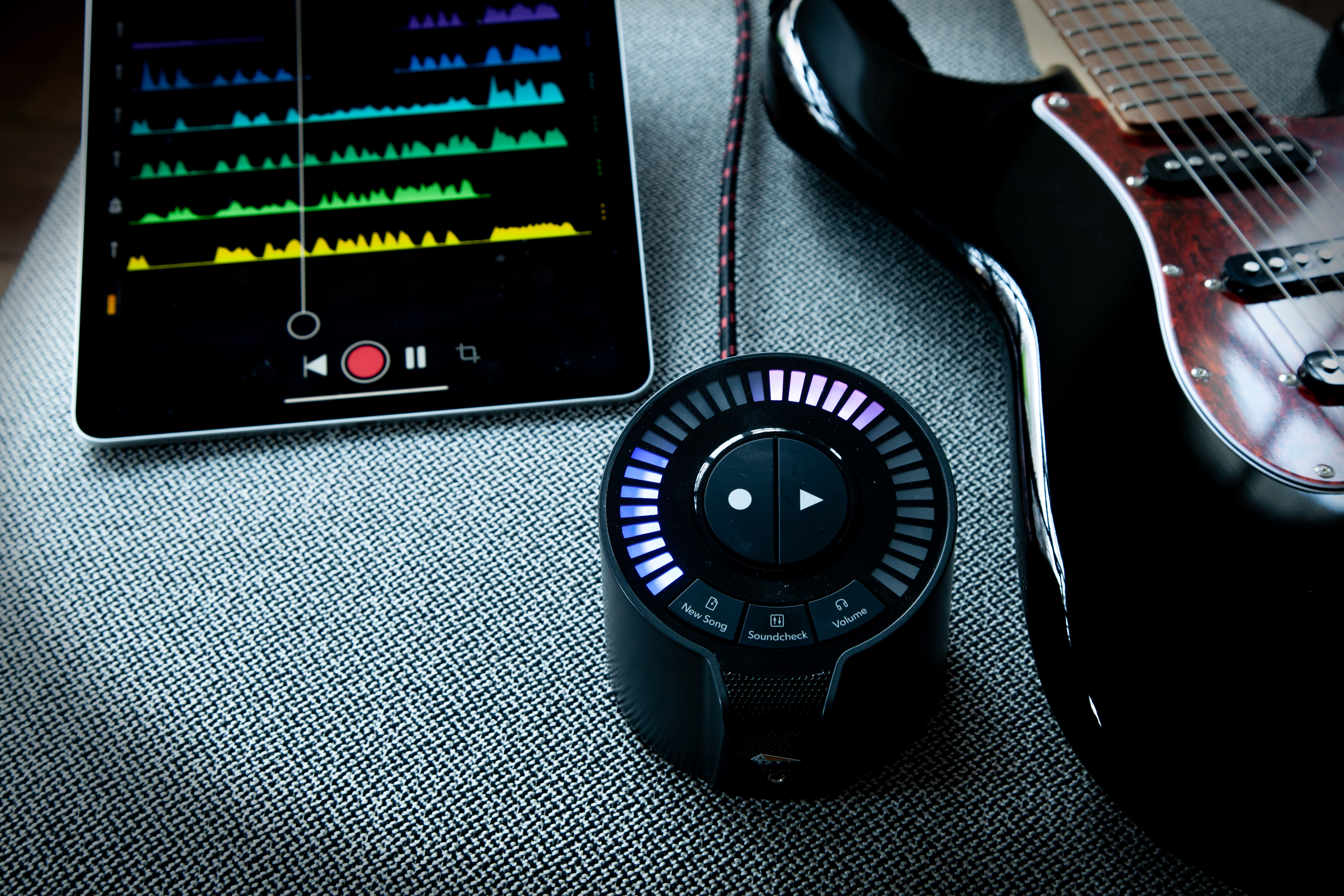
Spire with App

- Spire — iOS recording app (released July 24, 2015)
- iDrum and iDrum Mobile (acquired on December 4, 2006) — virtual drum machine
- Music and Speech Cleaner — audio cleanup and enhancement suite
- Sonifi — mobile remix mobile application developed by Sonik Architects
- The T-Pain Effect (released July 20, 2011) — beat and vocal recording software with pitch correction

=== Third-party plugins ===
- Ozone Maximizer Rack Extension (released June 14, 2012) for Reason — Reason 6.5 Rack Extension
- Mastering Essentials (released January 20, 2012) for Acoustica Mixcraft Pro Studio 6
- Radius (released May 19, 2006) — world-class time stretching and pitch shifting for Logic Pro and SoundTrack Pro

=== Discontinued products ===
- Ozone MP — analog modeled audio enhancement for Winamp and Windows Media Player
- pHATmatik PRO — loop-based sampler
- PhotonShow — photo slideshow software
- PhotonTV — photo slideshow software
- Spectron (released March 6, 2003) — 64-bit spectral effects processor

=== Compatible software ===
iZotope's software can be used with Pro Tools, Logic Pro, GarageBand, Cubase, Nuendo, WaveLab, Studio One, Adobe Audition, Reaper, FL Studio, Ableton Live, Reason etc. iZotope is compatible with most software that use VST or VST3 files.

== Hardware ==
iZotope introduced an iPhone-driven physical recording device, branded Spire Studio. The small, portable device works wirelessly with iZotope's Spire iOS app and includes 4GB of storage and an internal microphone, as well as audio inputs for connecting external instruments or microphones. Spire Studio is targeted to musicians, small bands, and home recordists, as well as the podcasting and meeting sectors.

== Licensing ==
iZotope licenses its software and technology licensing, offering development of technology for Mac and Windows platforms, mobile, video game, and embedded DSP. Clients have included Sony, Adobe, Xbox, Harmonix, Smule, Sonoma Wire Works, and most recently, Blue Microphones. Algorithms are delivered as a plugin or SDK for easy implementation. To date, iZotope technology has shipped in nearly 68 million products worldwide.

=== Licensed technologies ===
Mac/PC

iZotope has audio technology readily available in the form of VST, DirectX, AudioUnits, RTAS or AudioSuite plug-ins. Typical uses for licensed technology for Mac or PC applications include audio finalizing, music production, audio for video, presentation audio, metering to address broadcast loudness standards, and media playback. Categories of available licensed technologies include audio enhancement, voice enhancement, audio repair tools, creative tools, DJ tools, audiophile tools, time manipulation and audio for video.

Video Games

iZotope has developed plugins for use directly in Audiokinetic WWise for audio enhancement, voice effects occlusion and room modeling. In addition, iZotope has developed sound design tools and special effects for sound designers using the FMOD middleware engine. For middleware engines supporting XAudio and Multistream formats, iZotope has a collection of licensable DSP for use in music related games or karaoke.

Mobile SDKs

- Core FX
- Audio Repair
- DJ FX
- Vocal FX
- Trash FX
- Fun FX

Embedded

Noise reduction DSP is available for use in hardware using Analog Devices SHARC and Blackfin processors. In 2012, iZotope embedded Adaptive Noise Reduction and Keyboard Click Reduction technologies on Blue Microphones' Tiki USB Mic.

Other

- Omega — realtime time and pitch control
- Radius — natural time stretching technology. Integrated into Digidesign's Pro Tools Elastic Time as well as Cakewalk SONAR. Available as a plug-in for Apple Logic Pro.
- SRC — 64-bit sample rate conversion.

=== Notable licensing partners ===
Mac and PC	Video games	Mobile
Acoustica (Mixcraft); Sony (Soundforge, ACID); Avid (Pro Tools 10); Adobe (Audition); Serato (DJFX); Image-Line (FL Studio); Telestream (Screenflow); Prism Sound (SADiE 6); Akai (MPC Studio, Renaissance); Audiofile Engineering (Fidelia, Triumph); Cakewalk (Sonar X1); Grass Valley (Edius); Techsmith (Camtasia Studio); Audio Hijack (Rogue Amoeba)	Microsoft (Halo 4, Forza 4, Forza Horizon); Ubisoft (Michael Jackson: The Experience); Harmonix (Rock Band 3); Capcom (Resident Evil 2, Resident Evil 3, Resident Evil Resistance)	Smule (I Am T-Pain); Sonoma Wireworks (GuitarTone); Audiofile Engineering (FIRe 2); Harmonix (VidRhythm); Seven45 Studios (Soulo Karaoke)

== Artist references ==
- Musician Andrew Katz of Car Seat Headrest mentions using Ozone on 1 Trait Danger's cover of CAKE's "Friend is a Four Letter Word".
- iZotope receives credit from Trent Reznor and Nine Inch Nails on the album credits of Year Zero.
- American record producer Just Blaze mentions using Ozone on his latest project with Jay-Z.
- Rock band from the US Garbage refers using Stutter Edit, Ozone, and Trash.
- American DJ Skrillex discusses about using Ozone on his tracks.

== Awards and accolades ==
- Emmy Award Technology & Engineering Emmy (2013) — RX 2
- The Cinema Audio Society Outstanding Product Post Production (2021) — RX
