= The Technology EP =

EP by BT
- Released: April 20, 2004
- Genre: Electronica
- Length: 42:50
- Label: Nettwerk
- Producer: BT

BT chronology
Emotional Technology (2003)	The Technology EP (2004)	Human Technology (2005)

Professional ratings
Review scores
Source	Rating
Allmusic	3/5 stars

The Technology EP is a 2004 EP release from BT. The EP consists of 6 remixes of songs from his 2003 album Emotional Technology. It serves as a semi-official release of "Superfabulous", "The Force of Gravity" and "The Great Escape" as singles.

== Additional features ==
In addition to the six tracks, there are bonus features included on the disc. The music video for "Somnambulist (Simply Being Loved)", the first single from Emotional Technology, is included.

Perhaps the most remarkable inclusion, though, is that the individual components of the three unique songs have been separated and stored on the disc in AIFF format, so any listener can use a music editing program to create their own remixes.

== Track listing ==
No.	Title	Length
1.	"The Force of Gravity (BT's Edit)"	3:51
2.	"The Force of Gravity (Tiësto Remix)"	7:47
3.	"The Force of Gravity (Dylan Rhymes Push Up Mix)"	8:34
4.	"Superfabulous (Scott Humphrey Radio Mix)"	3:34
5.	"Superfabulous (Compufonic 12" Remix)"	8:18
6.	"The Great Escape (Attention Deficit Mix)"	10:36
Total length:		42:40
