= Somnambulist (Simply Being Loved) =

2003 single by BT

Single by BT

from the album Emotional Technology
- Released: August 2003
- Studio: Buddha Room
- Genre: Techno-pop
- Length: 4:38
- Label: Nettwerk
- Songwriter: BT
- Producer: BT

BT singles chronology
"Shame" (2001)	"Somnambulist (Simply Being Loved)" (2003)	"Love Comes Again" (2004)

Music video
- "Somnambulist" on YouTube

"Somnambulist (Simply Being Loved)" is a song by American musician BT, which contains vocals from American singer JC Chasez. It was released through Nettwerk in August 2003, as the lead single from BT's fourth studio album, Emotional Technology (2003). The techno-pop song was written and produced by BT. It consists of a bass drum, snare drum and Roland JP-8000, and contains 6,178 stutter edits. The lyrics were influenced by American writer Henry Miller and use a recurring mantra.

"Somnambulist (Simply Being Loved)" received generally positive reviews from music critics; some praised the production and Chasez's vocals, while other reviewers criticized the song's mainstream sound. It peaked at number 98 on the US Billboard Hot 100 and charted at number four on the Dance Club Songs chart. An accompanying music video was directed by Paul Minor. "Somnambulist (Simply Being Loved)" was included on the Guinness Book of World Records in 2003 for the largest number of vocal edits in a song, as well as on the North American version of the rhythm game, Dance Dance Revolution Extreme (2004).

== Background and release ==
BT asked JC Chasez to appear on "Somnambulist (Simply Being Loved)", after the former musician produced NSYNC's 2001 song "Pop". "Somnambulist (Simply Being Loved)" is the lead single from BT's fourth studio album, Emotional Technology (2003), and was released in August 2003. The song was written, produced, and engineered by BT at the Buddha Room. An accompanying music video was directed by Paul Minor, which Khalil Hegarty of The Age described as "slick MTV-style". "Somnambulist (Simply Being Loved)" peaked at number 98 on the US Billboard Hot 100 chart dated September 13, 2003, where it remained for three weeks. The song also peaked at number five on the Dance Club Songs chart dated July 19, 2003, and charted for 15 weeks. "Somnambulist (Simply Being Loved)" was included on the North American version of the rhythm game, Dance Dance Revolution Extreme (2004).

== Composition ==
Musically, "Somnambulist (Simply Being Loved)" is a techno-pop song. It includes BT's signature stutter edits with the audio manually altered by being "split, cut, joined, and [...] mangled", which was created using BT's setup titled Laptop Symphony. The stutter edits contributed to the song's inclusion on the Guinness Book of World Records in 2003 for the largest number of vocal edits in a song, with 6,178 edits. A "frequency-specific swing" is incorporated in "Somnambulist (Simply Being Loved)", which BT described on the January 2004 issue of Keyboard as "higher frequencies [...] swinging harder, and lower frequencies [...] swinging less". The beats on the song's kick and snare contain 1,025 samples, while the percussion on the Roland JP-8000's acid line contain 202 samples. The lyrics are inspired by American writer Henry Miller, and include the mantra: "Simply being love, love, loved is more than enough."

== Critical reception ==
Writing for The Washington Post, Richard Harrington described "Somnambulist (Simply Being Loved)" as "lightly propulsive". Billboard writer Keith Caulfield wrote that it is "hypnotic" and singled out the song as a highlight from Emotional Technology. Michael Hamersly of Miami Herald compared the "quirky" sound in "Somnambulist (Simply Being Loved)" to Star Wars character R2-D2 and commented that the chorus is "spiritual". However, Los Angeles Times writer Tommy Nguyen opined that it is "hopelessly moderate" in BT's attempts for a "[vague] crossover sound".

Matt Frilingos of The Daily Telegraph stated that "Somnambulist (Simply Being Loved)" "[hit] the mark" and acknowledged that BT could identify "emotive vocals", while Calgary Herald writer Nick Lewis praised Chasez's vocals on the "catchy" song. Writing for PopMatters, Andy Hermann criticized the repetitive lyrics and described BT's foray into the pop genre as "drivel".

== Track listing ==
US Remixes CD single

Somnabulist Remixes
No.	Title	Length
1.	"Somnambulist" (Original Version) (edit)	4:38
2.	"Somnambulist" (Junkie XL Vocal Mix)	8:51
3.	"Somnambulist" (Sander Kleinenberg's Convertible Mix)	9:59
4.	"Somnambulist" (Burufunk Remix)	7:28

== Credits and personnel ==
Credits adapted from the back cover of "Somnambulist (Simply Being Loved)".

- Written, produced and engineered by BT
- Vocals by BT (Note: Chasez is credited for providing vocals in the song by secondary sources.)
- Recorded at the Buddha Room
- Vocal sound design and additional production in Kyma

== Charts ==
Chart performance for "Somnambulist (Simply Being Loved)"
Chart (2003)	Peak position
US Billboard Hot 100	98
US Dance Club Songs (Billboard)	5
US Dance/Electronic Singles Sales (Billboard)	18
US Dance/Mix Show Airplay (Billboard)	4
