= Agnus Dei (Barber) =

Choral composition by Samuel Barber

- by Samuel Barber
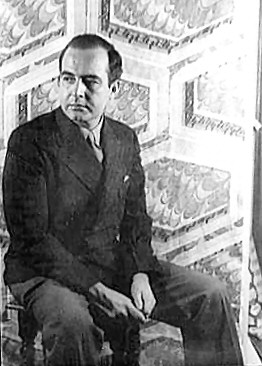
- Samuel Barber, photographed by Carl Van Vechten, 1944
- Key: B-flat minor
- Year: 1967
- Text: Agnus Dei
- Language: Latin
- Based on: Adagio for Strings
- Scoring: Choir SATB divisi, optional piano or organ

Agnus Dei (Lamb of God) is a choral composition in one movement by Samuel Barber, his own arrangement of his Adagio for Strings (1936). In 1967, he set the Latin words of the liturgical Agnus Dei, a part of the Mass, for mixed chorus with optional organ or piano accompaniment. The music, in B-flat minor, has a duration of about eight minutes.

== History ==
Barber's Adagio for Strings began as the second movement of his String Quartet, Op. 11, composed in 1936. At the request of Arturo Toscanini, he arranged it for string orchestra, and in January 1938 sent that version to the conductor, who premiered it in New York with the NBC Symphony Orchestra. In setting it to the liturgical Agnus Dei, a part of the Mass, Barber changed the music only a little. As with the other arrangements of Adagio for Strings, it was published by G. Schirmer.

== Music ==
Graham Olson describes the composition for AllMusic. After reflecting the history and pointing out the Adagio's associations with mourning, nostalgia, love and passion, qualified as "sentimental Romanticism", he writes about the choral setting: "Barber brought to the surface the work's sense of spirituality." He observes similarities to works of the Renaissance by Palestrina and Gabrieli. Violinist Phillip Ying says about the quartet movement: "The score looks so clear, like a counterpoint exercise, and the power of it is in the economy of means."

Agnus Dei is in B-flat minor, marked "molto adagio" (very slow) and "molto espressivo" (very expressive) and in the beginning "pp" (pianissimo, very soft). The initial time is 4/2, but some measures are expanded to 5/2 and 6/2 throughout the piece of 69 measures. The music is set for soprano, alto, tenor and bass (SATB); all four parts are sometimes divided; measures 12 to 14 call for a solo soprano. Soprano and alto are divided in two parts, tenor and bass occasionally even in three. The music is dominated by a melody, first presented by the soprano, which begins on a long note and then undulates in even rhythm and diatonic steps, a melisma of two measures on the words "Agnus Dei". The other voices enter half a measure later on a chord, move to a different chord in measure 2 and sustain it throughout the measure, while the soprano holds its first note through measure one and moves only after the supporting chord has changed to a tension. A similar pattern follows in measures 5 to 8 on the words "qui tollis peccata mundi" (who takes away the sins of the world), moving down on "peccata mundi". The repetition of the call "Agnus Dei" is set as variation of the beginning, intensified by upward leaps of fifths and octaves, and by the solo soprano reaching the highest note of the piece, C-flat. Then the alto takes over the melody, marked "più f[orte] sempre espressivo" (somewhat stronger and always expressive), while the soprano sings "miserere nobis" (have mercy on us) for the first time on a counter-melody. In measure 28, the bass takes over the melody, marked "p cresc. molto espressivo" (soft but growing, very expressive), while the three upper undivided voices sing "dona nobis pacem" (give us peace) the first time. In measure 35, the tenor takes over the melody, all parts are marked "with increasing intensity", soon the soprano gets the melody, interrupted by the alto moving in octaves (including a top A flat in measure 46 for first altos), then finally the soprano leads to the climax on the words "dona nobis pacem", ending in long chords, fortissimo, in extremely high register for all parts, followed by a long general break. After the silence, a slow succession of chords, repeating "dona nobis pacem" in homophony in very low register, modulates to distant keys such as C major and F major. After another silence, a kind of recapitulation begins with the soprano and tenor singing the melody in unison on "Agnus Dei ... dona nobis pacem", while alto and bass counter with "miserere nobis". In the final line, the alto broadens the beginning of the melody to a last "dona nobis pacem", marked "mf molto espr. sost." (medium strength, very expressive and sustained), while the other parts end on a very soft "miserere nobis", marked "morendo" (dying).

The piece lasts about eight minutes. The accompaniment is optional and only for support.

== Recordings ==
The Corydon Singers recorded the piece in 1986, together with Bernstein's Chichester Psalms and motets by Aaron Copland. The New College Choir, Oxford, recorded it in 1996. .In 1999, PC game Homeworld included this piece in its OST. 2000, the choir of Ormond College included it in a recording of Barber's choral music. In 2003, it concluded a collection of The Best Of Barber, sung by the Robert Shaw Festival Singers. Welsh classical crossover singer Katherine Jenkins included it on her 2008 album Sacred Arias. In 2015, the Rotterdam Symphony Chorus made a live recording of Agnus Dei during a concert tour with the BBC Symphony Orchestra.
