= Just Be (Tiësto song) =

2004 song by Tiësto

- Just Be single cover

Single by Tiësto featuring Kirsty Hawkshaw

from the album Just Be
- A-side: "Just Be - Antillas Club Mix"
- B-side: "Ancient History"
- Released: 11 October 2004
- Recorded: 2003
- Genre: Vocal trance
- Label: Magik Muzik; Black Hole
- Songwriters: Tijs Verwest; James Wiltshire; Judie Tzuke; Kirsty Hawkshaw
- Producer: Tiësto

Tiësto singles chronology
"Love Comes Again" (2004)	"Just Be" (2004)	"Adagio for Strings" (2005)

Kirsty Hawkshaw singles chronology
"Urban Train" (2001)	"Just Be" (2004)	"Sincere for You" (2004)

Audio sample
- "Just Be": file; help

"Just Be" is a song by Tiësto, featuring British singer and songwriter Kirsty Hawkshaw.

== Overview ==
With its first appearance being the title track of Tiësto's album Just Be, the song was released as the album's third single on 11 October 2004. The single was promoted with a remix by Antillas, which also became the selected track for the official music video. Antillas' remix was also the featured radio promo, while the original version of the song remained exclusive to the album. The Antillas' remix was made popular by John Garabedian, host of the syndicated Open House Party, as a frequent close out song to his program which he still plays to this present day.

The song was eventually reissued under a new title, "Just Be Me", produced by Jimmy Gomez. The alternative production made its debut on the 2004 drama series soundtrack Nip/Tuck: Original TV Soundtrack, compiled by American DJ duo Gabriel & Dresden. It eventually saw a second appearance the following year, being featured as the opening track on Kirsty Hawkshaw's second album, Meta-Message, released on 10 October 2004.

== Background and production ==
In a 2013 Reddit AMA, Kirsty Hawkshaw explained the creation and production of Just Be, where originally it was written by her friend Judie Tzuke, who also wrote the song "Dreaming", which Hawkshaw performed with BT. Hawkshaw had been a fan of Tzuke’s work since the 1970s and encouraged her to write lyrics and melodies for dance music tracks.

Hawkshaw recorded a version of the song, titled Just Be Me, with Jimmy Gomez and Judie Tzuke, who co-wrote the original instrumental backing. This version eventually appeared on Hawkshaw’s second album, Meta-Message. Both BT and Tiësto heard this version on Hawkshaw’s website and expressed interest in including the track on their albums. Hawkshaw initially hesitated but eventually agreed, citing the common practice in the dance music industry where DJs typically only play vocal tracks they own the rights to. She also commented on the tendency for vocalists in the genre to be treated as featured performers rather than full artists, which she found frustrating.

During the recording process for Tiësto's album Just Be, Hawkshaw said she worked in a studio in Eindhoven with friends known as Warm, including Dennis Waakop-Reijers, a co-producer on many of Tiësto’s classic tracks. Hawkshaw described Dennis as extremely talented and said she felt a strong musical connection with him. She recorded the vocals for Tiësto’s tracks there and sent them to his production team for further work. Hawkshaw described her relationship with Tiësto as limited but positive, including social meetings such as dinners near Breda. She characterized Tiësto as a production director who contributed ideas and direction rather than being a traditional musician. Hawkshaw regarded working with Tiësto as an important step in her career but publicly expressed disappointment at not being included in his tour and being replaced by session vocalists, a decision she found offensive.

== Official versions ==
- "Just Be - 514 Mix" – 8:49
- "Just Be - Antillas Club Mix" – 9:49
- "Just Be - Antillas Radio Edit" – 3:13
- "Just Be - Antillas Dub" – 9:19
- "Just Be - Antillas Edit Mix" – 4:10
- "Just Be - Wally Lopez la Factoria Vocal Remix" – 8:49
- "Just Be - Wally Lopez la Factoria Dub Remix" – 8:52

== Formats and track listings ==
=== CD, Maxi Singles ===
Australia Maxi-single

1. "Just Be - 514 Mix" – 8:49
2. "Just Be - Antillas Club Mix" – 9:49
3. "Just Be - Antillas Radio Cut" – 3:13
4. "Just Be - Antillas Dub Mix" – 9:19
5. "Just Be - Antillas Edit Mix" – 4:10
6. "Just Be - Wally Lopez Vocal Mix" – 8:59
7. "Just Be - Wally Lopez Dub" – 8:51
8. "Ancient History" – 8:43

Netherlands Maxi-single

1. "Just Be - Antillas Radio Edit" – 3:13
2. "Just Be - Antillas Club Mix" – 9:49
3. "Just Be - 514 Mix" – 8:42
4. "Just Be - Wally Lopez la Factoria Vocal Remix" – 8:57
5. "Ancient History" – 8:43

United Kingdom Maxi-single

1. "Just Be - Antillas Radio Edit" – 3:13
2. "Just Be - Antillas Club Mix" – 9:47
3. "Just Be - 514 Mix" – 8:41
4. "Just Be - Wally Lopez la Factoria Vocal Remix" – 8:52
5. "Just Be - Antillas Dub" – 9:18

United States Maxi-single

1. "Just Be - Antillas Club Mix" – 9:52
2. "Just Be - 514 Mix" – 8:45
3. "Just Be - Wally Lopez la Factoria Dub Remix" – 8:52
4. "Ancient History" – 8:42

United States Maxi-single

1. "Just Be - Antillas Radio Cut" – 3:13
2. "Just Be - 514 Mix" – 8:42
3. "Just Be - Wally Lopez La Factoria Vocal Remix" – 8:57
4. "Just Be - Antillas Club Mix" – 9:49
5. "Just Be - Antillas Club Dub" – 9:19
6. "Just Be - Wally Lopez la Factoria Dub Remix" – 8:52
7. "Ancient History" – 8:42

=== 12" Vinyl ===
Magik Muzik, Media Records, Kontor Records 12" Vinyl

1. "Just Be - Antillas Club Mix" – 9:49
2. "Ancient History" – 8:43

Nebula 12" Vinyl

1. "Just Be - Antillas Club Mix" – 9:49
2. "Just Be - 514 Mix" – 8:41

S2 Records 12" Vinyl

1. "Just Be - Antillas Club Mix" – 9:47
2. "Just Be - Wally Lopez Dub" – 8:51
3. "Just Be - 514 Mix" – 8:41

Kontor Records, Electropolis, Magik Muzik 12" Vinyl

1. "Just Be – 514 Mix" – 8:49
2. "Just Be - Wally Lopez la Factoria Dub Remix" – 8:52

Electropolis 12" Vinyl

1. "Just Be - Antillas Club Mix" – 9:49
2. "Ancient History" – 8:42

Wally Lopez Remixes

1. "Just Be - Wally Lopez la Factoria Vocal Remix" – 8:49
2. "Just Be - Wally Lopez -a Factoria Dub Remix" – 8:52

== Charts ==
=== Weekly charts ===
Chart (2004–2005)	Peak position
Belgium (Ultratop 50 Flanders)	8
Greece (IFPI)	8
Hungary (Dance Top 40)	13
Netherlands (Dutch Top 40)	3
Netherlands (Single Top 100)	12
Scotland Singles (OCC)	39
UK Singles (OCC)	43
US Billboard Hot Dance Airplay	20
US Billboard Hot Dance Singles Sales	5
US Billboard Hot Singles Sales	57

=== Year-end charts ===
Chart (2004)	Position
Belgium (Ultratop Flanders)	100
Netherlands (Dutch Top 40)	46

== Release history ==
Region	Date	Label	Format	Catalog
Netherlands	11 October 2004	Magik Muzik	vinyl, 12"	Magik Muzik 821-5
Netherlands	11 October 2004	Magik Muzik	vinyl, 12"	Magik Muzik 820-5
Netherlands	18 October 2004	Magik Muzik	CD, Maxi	Magik Muzik 820-2
Netherlands	18 October 2004	Magik Muzik	2 x vinyl, 12"	Magik Muzik 820-1
Germany	2004	Kontor Records	vinyl, 12"	Kontor414
Germany	2004	Kontor Records	vinyl, 12"	K 420
Germany	2 November 2004	Kontor Records	vinyl, 12"	Kontor416
Spain	2004	Electropolis	vinyl, 12"	VLMX 1701-3
Spain	2004	Electropolis	vinyl, 12"	VLMX 1700-3
United Kingdom	11 October 2004	Nebula	CD, Maxi	NEBCD062
United Kingdom	11 October 2004	Nebula	vinyl, 12"	NEBT062
United Kingdom	2004	Nebula	vinyl, 12"	NEBTX062
Australia	2005	Bang On!	CD, Maxi	BANG0098
United States	30 November 2004	Nettwerk America	2 x vinyl, 12"	0 6700 33237 1
United States	30 November 2004	Nettwerk America	CD, Maxi	0 6700 33236 2 8
Italy	2004	Media Records	vinyl, 12"	MR 2016
Switzerland	16 November 2004	S2 Records	vinyl, 12"	S2R 002-6
