= Nip/Tuck (soundtrack) =

Nip / Tuck: Original TV Soundtrack

Soundtrack album by Gabriel & Dresden
- Released: June 15, 2004
- Genre: Electronic
- Label: Nettwerk
- Producer: Gabriel & Dresden; Maria Alonte; PJ Bloom

The soundtrack of the Emmy and Golden Globe award-winning American television medical drama series Nip/Tuck created by Ryan Murphy for FX Networks was mixed by the DJ duo Gabriel & Dresden and the collaborations of other artists.

== Track listing ==
Nip / Tuck: Original TV Soundtrack (Mixed by Gabriel & Dresden)
No.	Title	Length
1.	"The Engine Room - A Perfect Lie (Gabriel & Dresden Remix)"	3:27
2.	"Poloroid - So Damn Beautiful"	3:40
3.	"Wax Poetic - Angels"	3:38
4.	"Daniel Ash - Fever"	4:26
5.	"Jazzupstarts - All The Way To The Top"	3:34
6.	"Kinky - The Headphonist"	4:28
7.	"Chris Coco - Falling"	3:22
8.	"Erin McKeown - Cosmopolitans (Tri-Factor Remix)"	5:49
9.	"Client - Price Of Love"	3:18
10.	"Kirsty Hawkshaw - Just Be Me"	3:43
11.	"Bebel Gilberto - Lonely"	2:24
12.	"Alpha - Elvis"	3:18
13.	"Chungking - Following"	4:47
14.	"Syntax - Pride"	6:17
15.	"The Engine Room - A Perfect Lie (Theme Song)"	0:45
16.	"Gabriel & Dresden - Tracking Treasure Down (Bonus Track)"	3:50
17.	"Gabriel & Dresden Podcast"	5:52
