= Stutter edit =

Digital audio manipulation

The stutter edit, or stutter effect, is the rhythmic repetition of small fragments of audio, occurring as the common 16th note repetition, but also as 64th notes and beyond, with layers of digital signal processing operations in a rhythmic fashion based on the overall length of the host tempo. The Stutter Edit audio software VST plug-in implements forms of granular synthesis, sample retrigger, and various effects to create a certain audible manipulation of the sound run through it, in which fragments of audio are repeated in rhythmic intervals. The plug-in allows musicians to manipulate audio in real time, slicing audio into small fragments and sequences the pieces into rhythmic effects, recreating techniques that formerly took hours to do in the studio. Electronic musician Brian Transeau (known as BT) is widely recognized for pioneering the stutter edit as a musical technique; he developed, coined the term, and holds multiple patents for the Stutter Edit software plug-in.

A stutter edit "contains a single segment of audio repeated a number of times, giving a performance a decidedly digital flavor." Stutter edits can go beyond 2,048th notes and can be measured in milliseconds, with layers of digital signal processing operations in a rhythmic fashion, and an individual note potentially containing within it many short fragments of sound. Above a certain point, these repetitions transition from rhythmic to tonal frequencies, making musical notes out of the repeated audio. These extremely short, fast groups of notes are often placed into the spacing of an eighth or sixteenth note in an otherwise "normal" bar, creating rhythmic accenting and patterns that call attention to a particular section. These patterns can be placed at the beginning of a bar, or towards the end for a more syncopated sound. One example is in the second verse of "Drop It Like It's Hot", Snoop Dogg mentions a DJ cut followed by a stutter edit and turntable scratch in reply.

'Stutter' edits, which are commonly used in a variety of pop music, including dance music and hip-hop, slice and dice clips into pieces and then reassemble them in a different order.

Transeau designed the plug-in to automate the arduous process of breaking audio into micro fragments and using them for new sounds, after experimenting with early versions of the software in his studio and in live performances. Around 2006, Transeau formed the software company Sonik Architects to develop the Stutter Edit plug-in and related tools. In 2010, Sonik Architects was acquired by iZotope, and in January 2011, the Stutter Edit plug-in, based on Transeau's patented technique, was released by iZotope and Transeau. It works by constantly sampling the incoming audio and storing it in a buffer, so that it can be used for repeating short loops or slices, with everything automatically sync'ed to the host tempo. Effects are applied using "Gestures", made up of one or more effects modules or a noise generator, each tied to a single MIDI note. It can be used for live laptop sets or DJing, or in the studio. BreakTweaker, a drum sequencer for beat layering, programming and composition that allows the user to manipulate audio at a micro level, was released by iZotope soon after.

== Creation ==
Due to the extremely rapid rhythmic bursts, after a certain rhythmic point—i.e. the 128th beat—some stutters, especially snare drums, begin to sound like a tone rather than a short percussive beat. Traditional stutter edits splice percussive vocals or drum loops because they begin as rhythmic rather than constant tones. These percussive, on-the-beat areas are known as attack transients, and are usually no longer than an eighth note. The splicing of percussive samples results in a more attention-grabbing sound than it would with a single sustained pitch. Stutters also often reduce notes within bars, beginning with 32nd notes, then reducing to 64th and 128th or something similar. There are instances of stutter edits that use logarithmic curves rather than relying on musically locked timings giving the impression of a "speed up" or "slow down".

== Related programs ==
- Break Tweaker: Break Tweaker is a drum sequencer for programming and composition, allowing for more crisp formation of very small notes, called micro-notes. Break Tweaker simplifies the micro-note creation, thereby simplifying the time-consuming trial-and-error process involved. It was created by Brian Transeau (aka BT) and was used heavily on his fifth studio album This Binary Universe.
- ReCycle: By software company Propellerhead, this program can change tempo independent of pitch. Unlike the slow, deep bass or fast chipmunk speak that often results from simple tempo changes, ReCycle allows pitch to stay constant, however it does not directly generate the aforementioned technique.
- Buffer Override: This program compresses buffer size, resulting in the desired stuttering sounds, especially those similar to the sound of a vocoder. It is more of a malleable granular technique than stutter editing.
- Memory: This VST effect allows you to vary length of a delay buffer (on beat)
- Glitch: This audio manipulation plugin splices sound into defined patterns. However, because of its range of effects, it is recommended either for the very patient or the more experienced user.
- Fruity WaveTraveller: FL Studio's "WaveTraveller" tool can be used for stutter edit effects.
- Gross Beat: Image Line's "Gross Beat" can produce stutter edit as well as glitch and scratching effects by buffering a real-time audio stream and applying manipulations.
- Kyma: Symbolic Sound's Kyma allows users to perform real-time stutter edits on sample loops or other audio sources. Unlike a dedicated stutter edit program, users must design their own Kyma sound for doing stutter edits, which can be accomplished through use of the Sample and/or Sequencer prototypes and clever CapyTalk scripting.

== See also ==
- Music sequencer
- Snare rush
