= So Damn Beautiful (Poloroid song) =

2003 song by Poloroid

Single by Poloroid
- Released: 29 September 2003
- Genre: Dance, trip hop
- Label: Telstar, Decode

"So Damn Beautiful" is the debut single from British singer-songwriter Poloroid, real name Danielle Rowe. It was released on 29 September 2003 in the UK, and peaked at number 28 on the UK Singles Chart and number one on the UK Dance Chart.

== Background ==
"So Damn Beautiful" was written by Rowe with two former bandmates, Lee Milleare and John Horrocks. It was first brought to the attention of nightclubs after British disc jockey Dave Seaman included it on the mix album Global Underground 012: Bueno Aires in 1999. Because of this attention for the song, Rowe was invited to perform a live set for BBC Radio 1 in Ibiza. As well as interest from the clubs, the track was also used in the UK as part of soundtracks to various victories of the England national football team, such as their 5–1 defeat of Germany in 2001 and their 1–0 victory over Argentina in 2002.

"So Damn Beautiful" was officially released by Telstar Records in the UK on 29 September 2003, in a radically remixed form by trance DJs Dogzilla. The song was playlisted on BBC Radio 1's C list and received airplay, where Australian singer Holly Valance expressed a like for the song on The Chris Moyles Show. "So Damn Beautiful" peaked at number 28 on the UK Singles Chart and number one on the UK Dance Chart – it was Poloroid's biggest chart hit. It was also used in the episode "Nanette Babcock" of the American drama Nip/Tuck and was included on the soundtrack album Nip/Tuck: Original TV Soundtrack. On reviewing the album, UK-based website musicOMH described the track as "lovely" and called it "a truly haunting song".

== Formats and track listings ==
- CD single
1. "So Damn Beautiful (Andy Morris radio mix)" – 3:30
2. "So Damn Beautiful (original mix)" – 3:48
3. "So Damn Beautiful (Dogzilla mix)" – 8:18

== Chart performance ==
Chart (2010)	Peak position
UK Dance (Official Charts)	1
UK Singles (Official Charts)	28
