= Emotional Technology =

Studio album by BT
- Released: August 5, 2003
- Genre: Electronica; pop; dance-pop; breakbeat
- Length: 78:13 (CD); 62:50 (vinyl); 71:11 (Spec. Collector's Ed., CD1)
- Label: Nettwerk
- Producer: BT

BT chronology
10 Years in the Life (2002)	Emotional Technology (2003)	The Technology EP (2004)

Singles from Emotional Technology
- 1. "Somnambulist (Simply Being Loved)" Released: March 20, 2003

Emotional Technology is the fourth studio album by electronica artist BT. Transitioning towards a more pop music oriented sound, the album features some of BT's more commercially successful releases, including "Somnambulist (Simply Being Loved)", "The Force of Gravity" and "Superfabulous". "Somnambulist (Simply Being Loved)" holds the Guinness World Record for most vocal edits in a single track, with 6,178 in the album version. The album features vocal performances by JC Chasez, Rose McGowan, and BT himself, among others.

== Background ==
The album's intro consists of a backwards sample of "Satellite", the closing track of Movement, followed by reversed samples of "Somnambulist" and "Dark Heart Dawning" from Emotional Technology. Shortly after "Somnambulist", the album moves from its pop-oriented sound into a more experimental direction, containing introspective lyrics and song structures and samples not normally found in trance music at the time (the extended breakdown section of "P A R I S" features a galloping horse and a choir, while "Communicate"'s chorus drops the beat entirely). Emotional Technology also found Transeau writing several epic rock songs in the vein of "Satellite". Several of these songs would later be replaced on the Special Collector's Edition release.

== Reception ==
Professional ratings
Aggregate scores
Source	Rating
Metacritic	61/100
Review scores
Source	Rating
AllMusic	3/5 stars
About.com	3.5/5 stars
E!	B−
Entertainment Weekly	C+
Filter	83%
Music Emissions	4/5 stars
Progressive-Sounds	8/10
Rolling Stone	2/5 stars
Slant Magazine	2.5/5 stars
URB	4/5 stars

Emotional Technology received mixed reviews from critics. At Metacritic, the album received an average score of 61 out of 100, based on 7 reviews. The album charted at 138 on the Billboard 200, making it BT's highest charting album to date.

== Remix contest ==
Prior to the album's release, BT and BPM Magazine held a remix contest for the album. Inside an issue of BPM Magazine would be an EP containing the individual parts for "Somnambulist", "Communicate", "The Great Escape" and "Superfabulous", as well as a new, unreleased track titled "Kimosabe" (which would become part of the soundtrack for Electronic Arts' racing video game Need for Speed: Underground) and also featured in a Harmonix Music Rhythm game Amplitude. The four winners were announced in early 2004 and they won signed copies of Emotional Technology among other prizes. Two notable winners were Toksin (for his remix of "Communicate") and Burufunk (for their remix of "The Great Escape"). Burufunk had previously remixed "Somnambulist" for when the song was released as a single in May 2003. They later worked with BT on his remix of The Doors' classic, "Break on Through (To the Other Side)". Toksin has since released remixes of "Superfabulous" and "The Great Escape" on his website. He has also remixed "Shame" in his live shows.. The song "Tao of the Machine" was used in the 2005 video game Need for Speed: Most Wanted.

== Singles ==
The album had only one official single, which was "Somnambulist (Simply Being Loved)". However, the Technology EP serves as a non-formal single release for "Superfabulous", "The Force of Gravity" and "The Great Escape".

== Track listing ==
All songs were written by BT, unless noted.

CD
No.	Title	Length
1.	"The Meeting of a Hundred Yang"	0:44
2.	"Knowledge of Self" (featuring Guru)	6:41
3.	"Superfabulous" (featuring Rose McGowan)	4:40
4.	"Somnambulist (Simply Being Loved)" (featuring JC Chasez)	4:20
5.	"Force of Gravity" (featuring JC Chasez)	8:19
6.	"Dark Heart Dawning"	7:08
7.	"The Great Escape" (featuring Caroline Lavelle)	6:58
8.	"P A R I S" (featuring Jody Wisternoff)	7:51
9.	"Circles"	4:43
10.	"Last Moment of Clarity" (featuring Karina Ware)	7:21
11.	"Communicate" (featuring Jan Johnston)	5:48
12.	"Animals"	7:24
13.	"The Only Constant Is Change"	6:16
Total length:		78:13

Japanese bonus disc
No.	Title	Length
14.	"Kimosabe" (feat. Wildchild)	6:55
15.	"Tao of the Machine" (feat. The Roots)	5:04
16.	"Love in the Time of Thieves" (feat. Tamra Keenan and Kevin Beber)	6:21
17.	"The Revolution" (feat. Rasco)	4:19
18.	"Somnambulist (Junkie XL Vocal Mix)"	8:56
19.	"Somnambulist (Sander Kleinenberg's Convertible Mix)"	10:03
20.	"Somnambulist (Burufunk Remix)"	7:30
21.	"The Great Escape (Attention Deficit Mix)"	10:37
22.	"Force of Gravity (Dylan Rhymes Push-up Mix)"	8:37
23.	"Force of Gravity (Tiësto Remix)"	7:48
Total length:		154:13

=== Vinyl ===
Side A
No.	Title	Length
1.	"Knowledge of Self"	8:14
2.	"Superfabulous"	5:27

Side B
No.	Title	Length
3.	"Somnambulist (Simply Being Loved)"	5:06
4.	"Force of Gravity"	9:58

Side C
No.	Title	Length
5.	"Dark Heart Dawning"	7:43
6.	"The Great Escape"	7:19

Side D
No.	Title	Length
7.	"P A R I S"	9:31
8.	"Last Moment of Clarity"	9:35
Total length:		62:53

=== Special Collector's Edition ===
Disc 1
No.	Title	Length
1.	"The Meeting of a Hundred Yang"	0:44
2.	"Knowledge of Self" (feat. Guru)	6:40
3.	"Somnambulist (Simply Being Loved)"	4:21
4.	"Force of Gravity" (feat. JC Chasez)	8:19
5.	"Dark Heart Dawning"	7:08
6.	"The Great Escape" (feat. Caroline Lavelle)	6:58
7.	"P A R I S" (feat. Jody Wisternoff)	7:48
8.	"Kimosabe"	5:34
9.	"The Revolution"	4:14
10.	"Last Moment of Clarity" (feat. Karina Ware)	7:11
11.	"Communicate" (feat. Jan Johnston)	5:57
12.	"The Only Constant Is Change"	6:04
Total length:		70:58

Disc 2
No.	Title	Length
13.	"Somnambulist (Mark Norman Remix)"	7:49
14.	"Love in the Time of Thieves" (feat. Tamra Keenan)	6:18
15.	"Force of Gravity (Tiësto Remix)"	8:18
16.	"Somnambulist (Junkie XL Vocal Mix)"	8:54
17.	"Superfabulous (Toksin's Rawshaker Mix)"	7:59
18.	"Force of Gravity (Dylan Rhymes Push Up Mix)"	8:38
19.	"Kimosabe (Hyper Remix)"	7:19
20.	"Communicate (Toksin's Narcan Remix)"	6:50
21.	"Somnambulist (Sander Kleinenberg's Convertible Mix)"	10:02
Total length:		143:05

== Personnel ==
- Guru – raps on "Knowledge of Self"
- DJ Swamp – "cuts and scratches" on "Knowledge of Self"
- Rasco – raps on "Knowledge of Self", "Circles" and "The Revolution"
- Rose McGowan – vocals on "Superfabulous"
- Scott McCloud – vocals on "Superfabulous"
- Brain – live drums on "Superfabulous", "Dark Heart Dawning", "Circles", "Animals", "The Only Constant Is Change" and "Kimosabe"
- Tommy Stinson – bass on "Superfabulous", "Circles", "Animals", "The Only Constant Is Change" and "Kimosabe"
- Richard Fortus – guitars on "Superfabulous", "Circles", "Animals", "The Only Constant Is Change" and "Kimosabe"; cello on "The Great Escape"
- JC Chasez – background vocals on "Somnambulist"; vocals on "The Force of Gravity"
- Doug Wimbus – pedal steel guitar on "Dark Heart Dawning"
- Alan Vavarin – percussion on "Dark Heart Dawning"
- Kurt Wortman – percussion on "Dark Heart Dawning"
- Donna Taylor – background vocals on "Dark Heart Dawning"
- Jackie Smiley – background vocals on "Dark Heart Dawning"
- Valerie Pinkston – background vocals on "Dark Heart Dawning"
- Caroline Lavelle – vocals and cello on "The Great Escape"
- Hutchy – raps on "P A R I S"
- Jody Wisternoff – additional production on "P A R I S"
- Karina Ware – vocals on "Last Moment of Clarity"
- Bill Hamel – co-producer for "Last Moment of Clarity"
- Jan Johnston – vocals on "Communicate"
- Blackwatch – co-producer for "Communicate"
- Wildchild – vocals on "Kimosabe"
- The Roots – performance on "Tao of the Machine"
- Tamra Keenan – vocals on "Love in the Time of Thieves"
- Kevin Beber – co writer on "Love in the Time of Thieves"
- BT – all other vocals, instruments and programming

== Charts ==
Chart (2003)	Peak position
US Billboard 200	138
US Top Dance Albums (Billboard)	1
US Heatseekers Albums (Billboard)	3
US Top Album Sales (Billboard)	138
