= Adagio for Strings (Tiësto song) =

- US CD variant of standard artwork

Single by Tiësto

from the album Just Be
- Released: 31 January 2005
- Genre: Uplifting trance
- Length: 7:23
- Label: Magik Muzik; Black Hole
- Songwriter: Samuel Barber
- Producer: Tiësto

Tiësto singles chronology
"Just Be" (2004)	"Adagio for Strings" (2005)	"UR" / "A Tear in the Open" (2005)

Official video
- "Adagio for Strings" by Tiësto on YouTube

Audio
- "Adagio for Strings" (nine-minute version) by Tiësto on YouTube

"Adagio for Strings" is a track by Dutch DJ Tiësto. It was first released in January 2005 as the fourth single from the album Just Be. A Trance remake of the classical music composition by Samuel Barber, the track takes the melody of the aforementioned piece (which is in 3/4 time) and adapts it into 4/4 time. In 2013, it was voted by Mixmag readers as the second greatest dance track of all time.

== Background and composition ==
Tiësto began using Adagio for Strings as the opening piece for a filmed concert in the Netherlands. In an interview cited by Rolling Stone Australia, he explained that he chose the piece because he wanted “a grand opening with a track people already know,” presented in a different stylistic form.

== Critical reception ==
EDM House Network characterizes the work as an example of Tiësto's “genre-defying” approach to electronic music. A review on DeBaser observes that the title Adagio for Strings commonly evokes its use in Oliver Stone's Platoon, which has become part of its broader public identity.

Tiësto's version has been repeatedly described as one of the defining tracks of his career. We Rave You referred to it as his “most famous” release.

== Formats and track listings ==
=== CD, maxi-singles ===
Australia, New Zealand, Sweden, United States Maxi-single

1. "Adagio for Strings" (Radio Edit)–3:28
2. "Adagio for Strings" (Original LP Version)–9:33
3. "Adagio for Strings" (Danjo & Styles Remix) - 11:22
4. "Adagio for Strings" (Fred Baker Remix) - 8:18
5. "Adagio for Strings" (Phynn Remix) - 7:09

Germany, United Kingdom Maxi-single

1. "Adagio for Strings" (Radio Edit)–3:25
2. "Adagio for Strings" (Original Mix)–9:35
3. "Adagio for Strings" (Fred Baker Remix) - 7:11
4. "Adagio for Strings" (Danjo & Styles Remix) - 11:31
5. "Adagio for Strings" (Phynn Remix) - 8:26
6. "Adagio for Strings" (video) - 3:31
- Includes a photo gallery and an interview taken from the DVD Tiësto In Concert 2.

=== 12" vinyl ===
Independence Records, Universal Licensing Music (ULM) 12" Vinyl

1. "Adagio for Strings" (Original Album Version)–7:23
2. "Adagio for Strings" (Radio Edit)–3:47

Nebula, Magik Muzik, Media Records 12" Vinyl

1. "Adagio for Strings" (Original LP Version)–9:33
2. "Adagio for Strings" (Fred Baker Remix)–7:11

Nebula, Magik Muzik, Nettwerk America 12" Vinyl

1. "Adagio for Strings" (Danjo & Styles Remix)–11:24
2. "Adagio for Strings" (Phynn Remix)–8:18

== Charts ==
=== Weekly charts ===
Chart (2005)	Peak position
Austria (Ö3 Austria Top 40)	54
Finland (Suomen virallinen lista)	12
Germany (GfK)	41
Hungary (Dance Top 40)	4
Hungary (Single Top 40)	1
Ireland (IRMA)	20
Romania (Romanian Top 100)	47
Scottish Singles Sales (Official Charts)	17
UK Singles (Official Charts)	37
UK Dance (Official Charts)	3
US Billboard Hot Dance Singles Sales	4

=== Year-end charts ===
Chart (2005)	Position
UK Singles (OCC)	225
Chart (2006)	Position
Hungary (Dance Top 40)	79

== Certifications ==
Region	Certification	Certified units/sales
United Kingdom (BPI)	Platinum	600,000^{‡}
^{‡} Sales+streaming figures based on certification alone.

== Official versions ==
- Just Be Album Version (7:23)
- Parade of the Athletes Album Version (5:57)
- Parade of the Athletes: Unmixed Album Version (9:34)
- Danjo & Styles Remix (11:31)
- Fred Baker Remix (7:11)
- Music Video (3:31)
- Original Mix (9:35)
- Phynn Remix (8:26)
- Radio Edit (3:25)
- Wrongun! Remix (7:55)
- W&W 2012 Rework (6:17)
- Blasterjaxx Remix (6:53)
