= Dogzilla =

British musical duo

- Origin: London, England
- Genres: Progressive house, trance
- Years active: 2003–2008
- Label: Maelstrom Records
- Past members: Simon Patterson; Richie Kayvan

Dogzilla were a British electronic music duo. The group had four major releases between 2003 and 2008, and was composed of Simon Patterson and Richie Kayvan, both based in London. They are most famous for their single "Without You" which charted in numerous countries, including Finland where it reached the number 11 spot. The song also appeared on many respected compilation albums such as Dave Pearce Dance Anthem Classics and former world #1 DJ Paul Van Dyk picked it as his track of the year. Their eponymously titled debut was featured in the 2004 film, 'The Football Factory'.

In 2008, Simon Patterson left the project, essentially leading to their dissolution. He has since become a successful trance artist in his own right.

Kayvan is now a music writer, producer and mix engineer, having worked with artists such as Ellie Goulding, Mark Morrison and Jamie Cullum. His mix of Judas Priest's 'Dissident Aggressor' won the band a Grammy Award in 2010.

== Discography ==
=== Singles ===
- 2003 – Dogzilla
- 2004 – Your Eyes
- 2005 – Without You
- 2007 – Frozen

=== Remixes ===
- 2003 – Solex (Close to the Edge)
- 2003 – In The Park
- 2003 – So Damn Beautiful
- 2004 – Amen (Don't Be Afraid)
- 2004 – It's All Vain
- 2004 – Come (Into My Dream)
- 2004 – When The Dawn Breaks
- 2005 – Dark Side of the Moon
- 2006 – The Ones We Loved
- 2006 – Stimulate
