= Parade of the Athletes =

Compilation album by Tiësto
- Released: 7 September 2004
- Genre: Trance
- Length: 72:25
- Label: Black Hole
- Producer: Tiësto

Tiësto chronology
Just Be (2004)	Parade of the Athletes (2004)	In Search of Sunrise 4: Latin America (2005)

Professional ratings
Review scores
Source	Rating
About.com	4.5/5 stars
AllMusic	4/5 stars
Entertainment Weekly	(C)

Parade of the Athletes is a retrospective mix by Dutch DJ Tiësto of his live set performed during the opening ceremony of the 2004 Summer Olympic Games in Athens, Greece on 13 August 2004. This was the first time that a DJ was asked to perform for a ceremony at the Olympics. Recognizing one of their own, the Dutch team came up to the booth while Tiësto was performing this set. All of the songs on this track are original songs composed by Tiësto except for "Adagio for Strings", which is his own remix of Samuel Barber's piece by the same name (the remix was also influenced by William Orbit's original electronic remix of the piece in 1999), and "Athena", which is also a remix of Adagio in G minor, a piece often attributed to Tomaso Albinoni, but actually composed by Remo Giazotto.

The album contains 8 new tracks composed exclusively for the Olympic Games Athens 2004 Opening Ceremony, and 4 other well-known tracks ("Traffic", "Lethal Industry", "Adagio for Strings" and "Forever Today"). An unmixed version was also released.

== Track listing ==
Parade of the Athletes
No.	Title	Writer(s)	Length
1.	"Heroes"	Tijs Michiel Verwest	8:36
2.	"Breda 8pm (DJ Montana Edit)"	Tijs Michiel Verwest	6:43
3.	"Ancient History"	Tijs Michiel Verwest	6:06
4.	"Traffic"	Tijs Michiel Verwest	4:13
5.	"Euphoria"	Tijs Michiel Verwest	6:05
6.	"Athena"	Tijs Michiel Verwest	6:17
7.	"Olympic Flame"	Tijs Michiel Verwest, Daniël Stewart, Geert Huinink	5:34
8.	"Lethal Industry"	Tijs Michiel Verwest	4:36
9.	"Coming Home"	Tijs Michiel Verwest	6:28
10.	"Adagio for Strings"	Samuel Barber	5:57
11.	"Victorious"	Tijs Michiel Verwest, Daniël Stewart, Geert Huinink	4:38
12.	"Forever Today"	Tijs Michiel Verwest, Daniël Stewart, Geert Huinink	7:06

== Charts and certifications ==
=== Weekly charts ===
Chart (2004)	Peak position
Belgian Albums (Ultratop Flanders)	18
Belgian Albums (Ultratop Wallonia)	91
Dutch Albums (Album Top 100)	4
German Albums (Offizielle Top 100)	85
Greek Albums (IFPI)	5
UK Albums (OCC)	84
US Top Dance Albums (Billboard)	3

=== Year-end charts ===
Chart (2004)	Position
Belgian Albums (Ultratop Flanders)	99
Dutch Albums (Album Top 100)	62
Chart (2005)	Position
Belgian Albums (Ultratop Flanders)	100
US Top Dance/Electronic Albums (Billboard)	22

=== Certifications ===
Country	Certification
Greece (IFPI Greece)	Gold
New Zealand (NVPI)	Gold
United Kingdom (BPI)	Silver

== Release history ==
Region	Date	Label	Format	Catalog
Netherlands	2004	Magik Muzik	CD; mixed	Magik Muzik CD 04
Netherlands	14 October 2004	Magik Muzik	4 x vinyl; LP; Limited Edition; album	Magik Muzik LP 04
Spain	21 October 2004	Vale	CD; mixed	VLCD 322-1
Spain	21 October 2004	Electropolis	4 x vinyl; LP; Limited Edition	VLMX 1697-3
United States	2 November 2004	Nettwerk America	CD; album; mixed	0 6700 30393 2 1
Australia	8 October 2004	Bang On!	CD	BANGCD037
Mexico and Latin America	2004	Corporacion Discografica Iberoamericana	CD; mixed	2552-2
Asia	2004	Avex Asia Ltd.	CD; mixed	AVTCD-95786
Germany and Europe	15 October 2004	Edel	CD; mixed	0158472 KON
Germany and Europe	15 October 2004	Kontor	4 x vinyl; LP; Limited Edition	Kontor409
Russia	2004	Dance Planet Ltd.	CD	DPCD029-04
United Kingdom	October 2004	Nebula	2 x vinyl; 12"	NEBT 9011
United Kingdom	October 2004	Nebula	2 x vinyl; 12"	NEBTX 9011
United Kingdom	October 2004	Nebula	CD; mixed; promo	MX335917688d17
