= Adagio for Strings =

1938 musical work by Samuel Barber

- by Samuel Barber
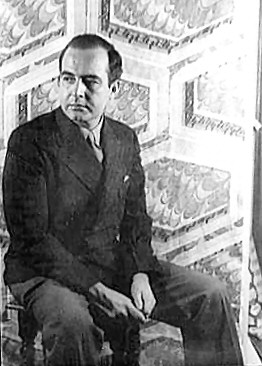
- Samuel Barber, photographed by Carl Van Vechten, 1944
- Key: B♭ minor
- Year: 1936
- Based on: Barber's String Quartet
- Duration: Approximately eight minutes
- Scoring: String orchestra

Premiere
- Date: November 5, 1938
- Location: NBC Studio 8H, New York City
- Conductor: Arturo Toscanini
- Performers: NBC Symphony Orchestra

Audio sample
- 30-second sample of Adagio for Strings: file; help

Adagio for Strings is a work by Samuel Barber arranged for string orchestra from the second movement of his String Quartet, Op. 11.

Barber finished the arrangement in 1936, the same year that he wrote the quartet. It was performed for the first time on November 5, 1938, by Arturo Toscanini conducting the NBC Symphony Orchestra in a radio broadcast from NBC Studio 8H. Toscanini also conducted the piece on his South American tour with the NBC Symphony in 1940.

Its reception has generally been positive, with Alexander J. Morin writing that Adagio for Strings is "full of pathos and cathartic passion" and that it "rarely leaves a dry eye". The music is the setting for Barber's 1967 choral arrangement of Agnus Dei. It has been called "America's semi-official music for mourning." Adagio for Strings has been featured in many TV and movie soundtracks.

== History ==
Barber's Adagio for Strings was originally the second movement of his String Quartet, Op. 11, composed in 1936 while he was spending a summer in Europe with Gian Carlo Menotti, an Italian composer and Barber's partner since their student years at the Curtis Institute of Music. Barber was inspired by Virgil's didactic poem Georgics. In the quartet, the Adagio follows a violently contrasting first movement (Molto allegro e appassionato) and is succeeded by a third movement that opens with a brief reprise of the music from the first movement (marked Molto allegro (come prima) – Presto).

In January 1938, Barber sent an orchestrated version of the Adagio for Strings to Arturo Toscanini. The conductor returned the score without comment, which annoyed Barber. Toscanini sent word through Menotti that he was planning to perform the piece and had returned it simply because he had already memorized it. It was reported that Toscanini did not look at the music again until the day before the premiere. On November 5, 1938, a selected audience was invited to Studio 8H in Rockefeller Center to watch Toscanini conduct the first performance; it was broadcast on radio and also recorded. Initially, the critical reception was mixed. The New York Times' Olin Downes praised the piece, but he was reproached by other critics who claimed that he overrated it.

Toscanini conducted Adagio for Strings in South America and Europe, the first performances of the work on both continents. Over April 16–19, 1942, the piece had public performances by the Philadelphia Orchestra conducted by Eugene Ormandy at Carnegie Hall. Like the original 1938 performance, these were broadcast on radio and recorded.

== Composition ==
Adagio for Strings begins softly with a B♭ played by the first violins.

The lower strings come in two beats after the violins, which, as Johanna Keller from The New York Times put it, creates "an uneasy, shifting suspension as the melody begins a stepwise motion, like the hesitant climbing of stairs". NPR Music said that "with a tense melodic line and taut harmonies, the composition is considered by many to be the most popular of all 20th-century orchestral works." Thomas Larson remarked that the piece "evokes a deep sadness in those who hear it". Many recordings of the piece have a duration of about eight minutes. According to music theorist Matthew BaileyShea, the Adagio "features a deliberately archaic sound, with Renaissance-like polyphony and simple tertian harmonies" underlying a "chant-like melody". The work is in "the key of B♭ minor (with some modal inflections)".

The Adagio is an example of arch form and builds on a melody that first ascends and then descends in stepwise fashion. Barber subtly manipulates the pulse throughout the work by varying the primary 4/2 time signature with isolated measures of 5/2, 6/2, and 3/2. After four climactic chords and a long pause, the piece presents the opening theme again and fades away on an unresolved dominant chord.

Music critic Olin Downes wrote that the piece is very simple at climaxes, but reasoned that the simple chords create significance for the piece. Downes went on to say: "That is because we have here honest music, by an honest musician, not striving for pretentious effect, not behaving as a writer would who, having a clear, short, popular word handy for his purpose, got the dictionary and fished out a long one."

== Critical reception ==
Alexander J. Morin, author of Classical Music: The Listener's Companion (2001), said that the piece was "full of pathos and cathartic passion" and that it "rarely leaves a dry eye". Reviewing the premiere performance in 1938, Olin Downes noted that with the piece, Barber "achieved something as perfect in mass and detail as his craftsmanship permits".

In an edition of A Conductor's Analysis of Selected Works, John William Mueller devoted over 20 pages to Adagio for Strings. Wayne Clifford Wentzel, author of Samuel Barber: A Research and Information Guide (Composer Resource Manuals), said that it was a piece usually selected for a closing act because it was moderately famous. Roy Brewer, writer for AllMusic, said that it was one of the most recognizable pieces of American concert music. The musicologist Bill McGlaughlin compares its role in American music to the role that Edward Elgar's "Nimrod" holds for the British.

In 1996, American musician Billy Joel described his reaction to the piece during a Q&A appearance where a woman asks him to compose a song on the spot, as well as several interviews. Instead, Joel describes a piece that inspires him, which is the Adagio, saying that, "This is what I love about music. This is what I want to do. This is what I want to create. It's what I've always tried to create. ... And I hope before I can't write anymore, I can create music like that.”

As part of a musical retrospective in 2000, NPR named Adagio for Strings one of the 100 most important American musical works of the 20th century, calling it "standard repertoire for today's orchestras, and Barber's best-known work". In 2019, NPR revisited the piece, with writer Anastasia Tsioulcas suggesting it arrived at "the right moment, when America was still hurting from the Great Depression and Europe was sliding into war." She continued by noting how young people reinterpret "America's semi-official music for mourning" as an expression of joy, using the example of Dutch DJ Tiësto's remix of Adagio for Strings as a dance music anthem, which caught the attention of the 2004 Olympics Organizers in Athens (ATHOC) and is included on Parade of the Athletes, Tiësto's retrospective mix of his live set performed during the opening ceremony.

In 2004, listeners to the BBC Radio's Today program voted Adagio for Strings the "saddest classical" work ever, ahead of "Dido's Lament" from Dido and Aeneas by Henry Purcell, the Adagietto from Gustav Mahler's 5th symphony, Metamorphosen by Richard Strauss, and Gloomy Sunday as sung by Billie Holiday.

== Arrangements ==
G. Schirmer has published several alternate arrangements for Adagio for Strings. They include:

- Solo organ (1949) – William Strickland
- Clarinet choir (1964) – Lucien Cailliet
- Woodwind band (1967) – John O'Reilly
- Agnus Dei (1967) – Samuel Barber – Latin text setting of "Agnus Dei" (Lamb of God) for chorus with optional organ or piano accompaniment
- Chorus with strings (2021) – Jonathan Manners, also setting the Agnus Dei text. Performed on the 20th anniversary of September 11 attacks (9/11) at The Last Night of the Proms 2021, London UK, in memory of those lost. The new arrangement was performed 20 years after the original Adagio for Strings was performed at the 2001 Last Night to honour the memory of the victims of 9/11, conducted by Leonard Slatkin.

Strickland, while assistant organist at St Bartholomew's Church in New York, had been impressed by Toscanini's recording of the work and had submitted his own arrangement for organ to Schirmer. After he made contact with Barber at a musical soirée in 1939, he learned that his transcription had received a lukewarm response from the composer. Strickland, subsequently appointed wartime director of music at the Army's Fort Myer in Virginia, became a champion of Barber's new compositions. He continued to correspond with the composer.

In 1945, Barber wrote to Strickland expressing his dissatisfaction with previously proposed organ arrangements; he encouraged Strickland to discuss and prepare his own version for publication.

Schirmer's have had several organ arrangements submitted of my Adagio for Strings and many inquiries as to whether it exists for organ. I have always turned them down, as, although I know little about the organ, I am sure your arrangement would be best. Have you got the one you did before, if not, would you be willing to make it anew? If so, will you ever be in N.Y. on leave, so I could discuss it with you and hear it? If it is done at all, I should like it done as well as possible, and this by you. They would pay you a flat fee for the arrangement, although I don't suppose it will be very much. However, that is their affair. Let me know what you think about it.

Strickland, having kept the piece, sent his organ arrangement to G. Schirmer. The company published it in 1949.

== Notable use ==
The recording of the world premiere in 1938, with Arturo Toscanini conducting the NBC Symphony Orchestra, was selected in 2005 for permanent preservation in the National Recording Registry at the United States Library of Congress. Since the 1938 recording, the Adagio for Strings has frequently been heard throughout the world, particularly in times of mourning. It was one of the few American pieces to be played in the Soviet Union during the Cold War. Barber voiced misgivings with the piece's ubiquity, saying in a 1978 interview, "They always play that piece. I wish they'd play some of my other pieces."

Notable invocations or performances of the piece include, chronologically:

- Broadcast over radio at the announcement of Franklin D. Roosevelt's death (1945).
- Played at the funeral of Albert Einstein (1955).
- Performed by the National Symphony Orchestra in a national radio broadcast following the funeral of assassinated President John F. Kennedy (1963). The piece was one of Kennedy's favorites.
- Conducted by Leonard Bernstein at four consecutive New York Philharmonic concerts in memory of Samuel Barber shortly after Barber's death (1981).
- Played at the funeral of Princess Grace of Monaco (1982).
- Played (as Barber's vocal choir arrangement, Agnus Dei) during the introduction cinematic of the video game Homeworld (1999), as well as during several pivotal moments in its story.
- Performed at Last Night of the Proms in 2001 at the Royal Albert Hall to honor the victims of the September 11 attacks.
- Played during the 2010 Winter Olympics opening ceremony in Vancouver.
- Played as the final song on the Peter, Paul and Mary compilation album Peter Paul and Mary With Symphony Orchestra: The Prague Sessions (2010). Mary Travers had requested that Adagio for Strings be played at her memorial service.
- Played at the state funeral of Canadian Leader of the Opposition Jack Layton (2011).
- Played in Trafalgar Square, on January 9, 2015, by an ensemble of 150 string players led by Thomas Gould of the Aurora Orchestra following the terrorist attack on Charlie Hebdo.
- Played by the Singapore Symphony Orchestra conducted by Lan Shui at the funeral of Singapore's first prime minister Lee Kuan Yew on March 29, 2015.
- Played by the Brussels Philharmonic on March 25, 2016, in front of the Bourse Palace following the 2016 Brussels bombings earlier that week.
- Played in Central Park in New York City on June 15, 2016, for the victims of the Orlando nightclub shooting.
- Played at the televised memorial in Manchester, England, on May 23, 2017, for the victims of the Manchester Arena bombing.
- Played at the digital European Concert in the Berliner Philharmonie by the Berlin Philharmonic under Kirill Petrenko on May 1, 2020, for Coronavirus victims.
- Performed at Last Night of the Proms in 2021 at the Royal Albert Hall on the 20th anniversary of 9/11, in a new arrangement for chorus and strings.

Adagio for Strings can also be heard on many film and television soundtracks, including The Elephant Man (1980), Platoon (1986), Lorenzo's Oil (1992), and Outlander (2019). More comedic or lighthearted uses of it have appeared in the film Amélie (2001) and on episodes of the sitcoms Seinfeld, The Simpsons, American Dad!, and South Park.

=== Adaptations ===
The group eRa included Adagio for Strings in their 2009 album Classics. English rock group Muse interpolated Adagio for Strings on their songs "Plug In Baby" and "Interlude".

The work is popular in the electronic dance music genre, notably in trance. Artists, including DJs who have covered it include William Orbit, Ferry Corsten, Tiësto (eponymously titled single) and Lucas & Steve.
