= In Search of Sunrise 10: Australia =

Compilation album by Richard Durand
- Released: 18 June 2012
- Genres: Trance, Dance
- Length: 3:42:51 (Total); 74:20 (Disc 1); 72:25 (Disc 2); 76:06 (Disc 3)
- Label: SongBird

In Search of Sunrise chronology
In Search of Sunrise 9: India (2011)	In Search of Sunrise 10: Australia (2012)	In Search of Sunrise 11: Las Vegas (2013)

Richard Durand chronology
In Search of Sunrise 9: India (2011)	In Search of Sunrise 10: Australia (2012)	Richard Durand vs The World (2012)

In Search of Sunrise 10: Australia is a compilation album by Dutch trance producer Richard Durand. It was released on 18 June 2012 by SongBird. It is the tenth installment in the In Search of Sunrise compilation series. To celebrate the tenth release in the series, a contest was launched. The goal was to mix the best compilation of tracks from the older In Search Of Sunrise mixes. The winner, Thomas Mengel, got his mix released as the third CD.

== Track listing ==
Disc one
No.	Title	Artist(s)	Length
1.	"Velvet" (Intro)	Richard Durand	2:02
2.	"Paint The Sky"	Richard Durand & Pedro Del Mar Feat. Roberta Harrison	6:23
3.	"Sunrise 6AM"	Eximinds	5:09
4.	"Gone"	Danny Dove Feat. Susie Ledge	2:33
5.	"Duality"	Timur Shafiev Presents S00perstar	4:51
6.	"Letting Go"	Dimension Feat. Arielle Maren	4:44
7.	"Nova Flare"	Mike Saint-Jules Vs. Basil O'Glue	4:36
8.	"Satellites"	Alex O'Rion	3:59
9.	"Without You"	Somna & Vijo Caselle Feat. Sarah-Jane Neild	4:51
10.	"October Sun"	Easton	5:38
11.	"Black Is Back" (Classic Vocal Mix)	Super8 & Tab Feat. Jan Burton	5:30
12.	"Epyx"	DJ San, DJ Ruby & Mark U-Bahn	4:49
13.	"Miss You Paradise" (Shogun Remix)	Emma Hewitt	6:29
14.	"Polarized" (Roger Shah Anthem Mix)	Epos	5:53
15.	"Heading Home"	Craving & Howe	6:53
Total length:			74:20

Disc two
No.	Title	Artist(s)	Length
1.	"Paradise" (Intro)	Richard Durand	2:01
2.	"My Life"	Zoo Brazil Feat. Rasmus Kellerman	3:28
3.	"Frolic"	JPL	4:10
4.	"Let It Shine" (Walsh & McAuley Remix)	Betsie Larkin With Björn Åkesson	4:40
5.	"Maono"	Sunny Lax	3:54
6.	"In Motion"	Richard Durand	4:57
7.	"Titan"	Karanda	6:00
8.	"Zion"	Norin & Rad	5:07
9.	"Aura"	Venaccio	4:25
10.	"Blueprint"	Alex O'Rion	4:35
11.	"Four Steps To Eternity"	Dart Rayne	6:01
12.	"Somewhere Special" (Terry Da Libra Remix)	David Broaders	6:46
13.	"Endymion"	Ørjan Nilsen	6:01
14.	"Reflected"	Mark Bester	5:32
15.	"Out Of Sight" (Instrumental Mix)	Marc Simz Feat. Naomi Striemer	4:48
Total length:			72:25

Disc three
No.	Title	Artist(s)	Length
1.	"LAX"	Pink Elephant	2:44
2.	"Wasted"	Andy Duguid Feat. Leah	6:11
3.	"The Storm" (Inpetto Remix)	Jerry Ropero Feat. Cozi Costi	5:07
4.	"Beautiful"	George Acosta Feat. Fisher	5:30
5.	"Contact"	Glenn Morrison	5:45
6.	"Envy"	Kostya Veter Feat. Madelin Zero	6:45
7.	"Slow It Down" (Mathilda Mix)	Mads Arp Feat. Julie Harrington	5:15
8.	"Trozitos De Navidad" (Primavera Remix)	Marc Marzenit	4:37
9.	"Something For The Pain"	Ad Brown Feat. Renee Six	5:45
10.	"Arguru"	Deadmau5	6:00
11.	"Crossroads"	Zoo Brazil	5:30
12.	"Colour My Eyes"	Mark Norman Presents Celine	6:00
13.	"Still I Wait" (Richard Durand's In Search Of Sunrise Remix)	Jonas Steur Feat. Jennifer Rene	6:45
14.	"6AM" (Kyau & Albert Remix)	Cressida	4:12
Total length:			76:06
