= SongBird =

- Parent company: Black Hole Recordings
- Founded: 1997
- Founder: Tijs Verwest; Arny Bink
- Genre: Trance; vocal trance; progressive trance
- Country of origin: Netherlands
- Official website: www.blackholerecordings.com

SongBird is a Dutch sub label owned by Tijs Verwest (better known as Tiësto) and Arny Bink. It is a sub label of Black Hole Recordings, established in 1997, and is most well known as the label on which Tiësto's popular trance series, In Search of Sunrise, was released.

== Artists ==
- Alkatraz
- Andy Duguid
- Andy Moor
- Avis Vox
- Azotti
- BT
- Ben Preston
- Clear View
- Donna Fargo
- Cary Brothers
- Cor Fijneman
- deadmau5
- Giuseppe Ottaviani
- George Acosta
- Jason van Wyk
- Jes Brieden
- Emilio Fernandez
- Kimito Lopez
- Lange
- Markus Schulz
- Mark Norman
- Moonbeam
- Myon & Shane 54
- Orkidea
- Russel G.
- Richard Durand
- Somna
- Steve Forte Rio
- Tiësto

== Catalog ==
=== Albums ===
- SONGBIRD CD 01 DJ Dazzle - Freedom: A Celebration of Life (CD)
- SONGBIRD CD 02 DJ Dazzle - Freedom 2: A Celebration of Life (CD)
- SONGBIRD CD 03 Tiësto - In Search of Sunrise (CD)
- SONGBIRD CD 04 DJ Dazzle - Freedom 3: The Norway Sessions (CD)
- SONGBIRD CD 05 Tiësto - In Search of Sunrise 2 (CD)
- SONGBIRD CD 06 DJ Dazzle - Freedom 4: Somewhere In Time (CD)
- SONGBIRD CD 07 Tiësto - In Search of Sunrise 3: Panama (CD)
- SONGBIRD CD 08 Tiësto - In Search of Sunrise 4: Latin America (2xCD)
- SONGBIRD CD 09 Tiësto - In Search of Sunrise 5: Los Angeles (2xCD)
- SONGBIRD CD 10 Tiësto - In Search of Sunrise 6: Ibiza (2xCD)
- SONGBIRD CD 11 Tiësto - In Search of Sunrise 7: Asia (2xCD)
- SONGBIRD CD 12 Richard Durand - In Search of Sunrise 8: South Africa (2xCD)
- SONGBIRD CD 13 Andy Duguid - Miracle Moments (2xCD)
- SONGBIRD CD 14 Pedro Del Mar - Mellomania 20 (2xCD)
- SONGBIRD CD 15 Richard Durand - In Search of Sunrise 9: India (2xCD)
- SONGBIRD CD 16 Pedro Del Mar - Mellomania 21 (2xCD)
- SONGBIRD CD 17 Richard Durand - In Search of Sunrise 10: Australia (3xCD)
- SONGBIRD CD 18 Pedro Del Mar - Mellomania 22 (2xCD)
- SONGBIRD CD 19 Richard Durand & Myon & Shane 54 - In Search of Sunrise 11: Las Vegas (3xCD)
- SONGBIRD CD 20 Pedro Del Mar - Mellomania 23 (2xCD)
- SONGBIRD CD 21 Richard Durand with Lange - In Search of Sunrise 12: Dubai (3xCD)
- SONGBIRD CD 22 Richard Durand with bt - In Search of Sunrise 13.5: Amsterdam (3xCD)

Forevermore digital only exclusive series

- SB DC 01 Forevermore, Vol. 1 Release Date: August 1, 2008
- SB DC 02 Forevermore, Vol. 2 Release Date: December 30, 2008
- SB DC 03 Forevermore, Vol. 3 Release Date: 2009
- SB DC 04 Forevermore, Vol. 4 Release Date: October 27, 2009
- SB DC 05 Forevermore, Vol. 5 Release Date: January 6, 2010
- SB DC 06 Forevermore, Vol. 6 Release Date: June 28, 2010
- SB DC 07 Forevermore, Vol. 7 Release Date: August 2, 2010
- SB DC 08 Forevermore, Vol. 8 Release Date: May 16, 2011

=== Vinyl ===
- SONGBIRD 201 Legato - Small Town Boy
- SONGBIRD 202 Mistral - Rhythm of Summer
- SONGBIRD 203 Moontribe - Dance of The Seventh Hill
- SONGBIRD 204 Mistral - In My Dreams
- SONGBIRD 205 Art of Trance - Breathe
- SONGBIRD 206 Nova Zembla - Nowhere To Go (The End of The Road)
- SONGBIRD 207 Moontribe - Encore
- SONGBIRD 208 Masai - One Vision
- SONGBIRD 209 DJ Dazzle - Freedom 4: Somewhere In Time
- SONGBIRD 210 LN Movement - Golden Desert
- SONGBIRD 210 Moonbeam - I Love Mornings
- SONGBIRD 211 Moonbeam - See The Difference Inside
- SONGBIRD 212 Russell G. - Dark Room
- SONGBIRD 213 Deadmau5 - Arguru
- SONGBIRD 214 Moonbeam - Seeming Reflection
- SONGBIRD 215 Clear View - Tell Me
- SONGBIRD 216 Moonbeam - 7 Seconds
- SONGBIRD 217 Steve Forte Rio - A New Dawn
- SONGBIRD 218 Emilio Fernandez - Let It Go
- SONGBIRD 219 Russell G. - Whiplash
- SONGBIRD 220 Cary Brothers - Ride
- SONGBIRD 221 Emilio Fernandez - Reynosa
- SONGBIRD 222 Russell G. - Lose It
- SONGBIRD 223 Deadmau5 - Clockwork
- SONGBIRD 224 Deadmau5 - Clockwork (Remixes)
- SONGBIRD 225 Cor Fijneman - Disappear
- SONGBIRD 226 Emilio Fernandez - Saltillo
- SONGBIRD 227 Ben Preston - Elizabeth
- SONGBIRD 228 Alkatraz - Rubble And Rust / The Hunted
- SONGBIRD 229 Russell G. - Every Which Way
- SONGBIRD 230 Kimito Lopez - There Is No Such Thing As Mermaids / Unicron
- SONGBIRD 231 Deadmau5 - Clockwork (Helvetic Nerds Remix)
- SONGBIRD 232 Alkatraz - Can't Go On
- SONGBIRD 233 Gustav - Gossip Girl
- SONGBIRD 234 Sunday Cinema - Models At Work
- SONGBIRD 235 Julius Beat - The Tunnel
- SONGBIRD 236 Ben Preston - Why We Run
- SONGBIRD 237 Kimito Lopez - Lost Souls / Monanza
- SONGBIRD 238 George Acosta - True Love
- SONGBIRD 239 Spartaque & Slava Flash - Openair
- SONGBIRD 240 Julius Beat & Eddy Karmona - Believes In Himself
- SONGBIRD 241 George Acosta - Tearing Me Apart
- SONGBIRD 242 Michael Angelo & Solo - Alone
- SONGBIRD 243 Steve Kaetzel - Black Opal
- SONGBIRD 244 Chris Domingo - Organica
- SONGBIRD 245 Steve Kaetzel - So Alone
- SONGBIRD 246 Future Disciple - Day Seeker
- SONGBIRD 247 Richard Durand & JES - N.Y.C.
- SONGBIRD 248 Matteo Marini - Next Day
- SONGBIRD 249 George Acosta - Beautiful
- SONGBIRD 250 Prayag & Rishab - Ashna
- SONGBIRD 251 D.E.R. & Julius Beat - Our Feeling
- SONGBIRD 252 Suspect 44 - Hold Me
- SONGBIRD 253 George Acosta - Love Rain Down
- SONGBIRD 254 Richard Durand & JES - N.Y.C. (Remixes)
- SONGBIRD 255 Avis Vox - Introspection Attempts
- SONGBIRD 256 George Acosta - Art Deco EP
- SONGBIRD 257 Deadmau5 - Arguru / Clockwork (Robbie Rivera Remixes)
- SONGBIRD 258 Ad Brown & Matt Lange - As The Rain Falls
- SONGBIRD 259 Triangle Sun - Beautiful
- SONGBIRD 260
- SONGBIRD 261 Andy Duguid - Miracle Moments
- SONGBIRD 262 Andrew Salsano & JF Sebastian - Walking On Fire
- SONGBIRD 263 Suspect 44 - Theres No One
- SONGBIRD 264 Kaddyn Palmed - 4 U
- SONGBIRD 265 Sebastian Weikum - Doomed
- SONGBIRD 266
- SONGBIRD 267 Steve Kaetzel - Floe / Aurora
- SONGBIRD 268 Marsbeing - Open Your Eyes
- SONGBIRD 269 Ben Preston - Pillars Of The Earth
- SONGBIRD 270 Audien - What Dreams May Come
- SONGBIRD 271 Shipstad & Warren - I'm Never Alone
- SONGBIRD 272 Ben Preston - Buried City
- SONGBIRD 273
- SONGBIRD 274 Kostya Veter - Envy
- SONGBIRD 275 Gosh - Nova
- SONGBIRD 276 Electric Pulse - Under The Stars
- SONGBIRD 277 Mehilove - Reality Bites
- SONGBIRD 278
- SONGBIRD 279 Zachary Zamarripa - Sassafras / Lies In Wait
- SONGBIRD 280 Sons Of Methuselah - Convolutions
- SONGBIRD 281 DJ Hashish - Fantasy / Starfish
- SONGBIRD 282 DJ Funkadelic & Beauriche - Subway
- SONGBIRD 283 Shipstad & Warren - Sex, Lies & Melody
- SONGBIRD 284 Soarsweep - Diffused Memories / Never Grow Up
- SONGBIRD 285 Andy Duguid - Miracle Moments (Remixes)
- SONGBIRD 286 George Acosta - True Love (Remixes)
- SONGBIRD 287 DJ Hashish - Heading North / The Sandcastle
- SONGBIRD 288 Gosh - Nova (Andrew Benson Remix)
- SONGBIRD 289 Sebastian Weikum - Adem
- SONGBIRD 290 Danny Dove & Ben Preston - Break Inside
- SONGBIRD 291 Future Disciple - Total Recall
- SONGBIRD 292 Michael Angello - Messa / Moments
- SONGBIRD 293 Andrew Benson & Gosh - Lost In Bermudas
- SONGBIRD 294 DJ Hashish - Lost / Profound
- SONGBIRD 295 Amex & Barlett Bros. - A New Dawn
- SONGBIRD 296 Santerna - Aquamarine / Parallax
- SONGBIRD 297 Ad Brown & Kerry Leva - Boxing Gloves
- SONGBIRD 298 Soarsweep - Hidden In The Cave / Feel No Pain
- SONGBIRD 299 Zachary Zamarripa - Calling
- SONGBIRD 300
- SONGBIRD 301 Moonpax - Ice Coffee
- SONGBIRD 302 Rene Martens - Point Of No Return
- SONGBIRD 303 DJ Hashish - Awakening / Oceanic
- SONGBIRD 304 Ad Brown & James Hockley - Summer Tide
- SONGBIRD 305 Santerna - Envision
- SONGBIRD 306 George Acosta - Never Fear
- SONGBIRD 307 Lost Stories - All Good Things
- SONGBIRD 308 Sunny Lax - Viva La Revolucion / Something Is Broken
- SONGBIRD 309 York - Reachers Of Civilization
- SONGBIRD 310 Future Disciple - Big Stones / Bright Tides
- SONGBIRD 311 Tastexperience - Control
- SONGBIRD 312 Nafis - My Way To You
- SONGBIRD 313 The Attic - Release Me
- SONGBIRD 314 Sons Of Methuselah - Mintaka
- SONGBIRD 315 Jorg Zimmer - Acamar / Sicily
- SONGBIRD 316 Future Disciple - Nail The Nile
- SONGBIRD 317 Jozhy K & Glittering Puzzle - Take My Breath Away
- SONGBIRD 318 Nuera feat. Szen - Stuck
- SONGBIRD 319 Somna & Vijo Caselle feat. Sarah-Jane Neild - Without You
- SONGBIRD 320 Spartaque & Slava Flash - Open Air
- SONGBIRD 321 George Acosta feat. Lizzie Curious - Like Home
- SONGBIRD 322 Nick Wax & Trenix present Eireann Wax - Here Tonight
- SONGBIRD 323 Rosie Romero & Ben Malone feat. Taya - Close Your Eyes
- SONGBIRD 324 Aerofeel5 feat. Eva Kade - Friday Night
- SONGBIRD 325 Alkatraz - Tropea
- SONGBIRD 326 Nafis - Cappadocia
- SONGBIRD 327 Amurai - Valencia
- SONGBIRD 328 Lence & Pluton - Times Like This
- SONGBIRD 329 Marsbeing feat. Matvey Emerson - With Me
- SONGBIRD 330 Aeonism - Swirl / Twilight
- SONGBIRD 331 Marsbeing & MalYar - Walking To The Stars
- SONGBIRD 332 Sunny Lax - Maono EP
- SONGBIRD 333 Hayley Parsons - 7th Heaven
- SONGBIRD 334 Jason van Wyk - Winter
- SONGBIRD 335 Steve Kaetzel feat. Brianna Holan - Darling
- SONGBIRD 336 Jason van Wyk & JPL feat. Cat Martin - Every Mile Away
- SONGBIRD 337 Max Roelse & Two Killers feat. Ange - Heart Breaking
- SONGBIRD 338 Kiholm feat. Josh Money - Long Way Home
- SONGBIRD 339 Motif feat. Naemi Joy - One More Time
- SONGBIRD 340 Steve Kaetzel feat. Emma Lock - I Loved You
- SONGBIRD 341 Santerna - Diffraction
- SONGBIRD 342 Somna & Amos feat. Seri - The Life I Had Before (Remixes)
- SONGBIRD 343 Roy Malakian - Caroma
- SONGBIRD 344 Steve Brian & York - Unchain Your Soul
- SONGBIRD 345 The Destiny - Perpetuum Mobile
- SONGBIRD 346 Haugli feat. Lizzie Curious - Your Touch
- SONGBIRD 347 C-Systems feat. Hanna Finsen - Just Begun
- SONGBIRD 348 Noa Assembly - Into The Fire
- SONGBIRD 349 Conil - Malibu Beach
- SONGBIRD 350 Various Artists - In Search Of Sunrise 12 Dubai DJ Sampler Part 1
- SONGBIRD 351 Various Artists - In Search Of Sunrise 12 Dubai DJ Sampler Part 2
- SONGBIRD 352 Vinson - Circular Progression
- SONGBIRD 353 Azotti feat. Bagga Bownz - Day And Night
- SONGBIRD 354 Jeremy Vancaulart & Assaf feat. Laura Aqui - The Space Between
- SONGBIRD 354-1 Jeremy Vancaulart & Assaf feat. Laura Aqui - The Space Between (Cold Rush Remix)

=== Long Plays ===
- SONGBIRD LP 08 Tiësto - In Search of Sunrise 4: Latin America (2xLP, Ltd, Smplr)
- SONGBIRD LP 09 Tiësto - In Search of Sunrise 5: Los Angeles (2xLP, Ltd, Smplr)
- SONGBIRD LP 10 Tiësto - In Search of Sunrise 6: Ibiza (2xLP, Ltd, Smplr)
- SONGBIRD LP 11 Tiësto - In Search of Sunrise 7: Asia (2XLP, Ltd, Smplr)

=== Samplers ===
- SONGBIRD 10S1CD Tiësto - In Search of Sunrise 6: Ibiza (Sampler 1) (CDr, Smplr, Car)
- SONGBIRD 10S2CD Tiësto - In Search of Sunrise 6: Ibiza (Sampler 2) (CDr, Smplr, Car)
- SONGBIRD 10S3CD Tiësto - In Search of Sunrise 6: Ibiza (Sampler 3) (CDr, Smplr, Car)
- MMCD10-D01 Tiësto - In Search of Sunrise 6 - Ibiza (Exclusive Beatport Sampler One) (File, MP3, Smplr)
- MMCD10-D02 Tiësto - In Search of Sunrise 6 - Ibiza (Exclusive Beatport Sampler Two) (File, MP3, Smplr)

== See also ==
- Black Hole Recordings
- In Search of Sunrise
- Tiësto
- List of record labels
