= In Search of Sunrise (series) =

In Search of Sunrise (Series)

Compilation album by Tiësto / Richard Durand / Markus Schulz
- Released: 1999–present
- Genre: Trance
- Label: Songbird

In Search of Sunrise (abbreviated ISOS) is a trance music mix-compilation music CD series released on SongBird, a subdivision of Black Hole Recordings originally founded by Tiësto.

== Installments ==
=== under Tiësto ===
The first seven installments in the In Search of Sunrise series were mixed by Tiësto.

The first installment debuted on the Billboard 200 at #170 with 4,200 sales.

Starting with the third album, each compilation was given a subtitle with a certain location that inspired the particular DJ.

For Latin America, the series expanded from a single CD to a 2-CD format.

- In Search of Sunrise (November 22, 1999)
- In Search of Sunrise 2 (November 30, 2000)
- In Search of Sunrise 3: Panama (May 29, 2002)
- In Search of Sunrise 4: Latin America (June 21, 2005)
- In Search of Sunrise 5: Los Angeles (May 25, 2006)
- In Search of Sunrise 6: Ibiza (September 7, 2007)
- In Search of Sunrise 7: Asia (June 10, 2008)
  - In Search of Sunrise 7: Asia (Armani Exchange Exclusive) (Limited Edition 3 CD Set) (June 13, 2008)

=== under Richard Durand ===
On April 7, 2010, Tiësto announced that, due to his departure from Black Hole Recordings, he would no longer be involved with the In Search of Sunrise series. The following day, Black Hole Recordings announced that the series would be mixed by Dutch producer Richard Durand.

For Australia, the series expanded to a 3-CD format.

Later installments would feature guest DJs: Las Vegas featured Hungarian DJ duo Myon & Shane 54, Dubai featured British producer/DJ Lange, And Amsterdam, numbered "13.5" due to Durand's "13-phobia", featured American producer/DJ BT.

- In Search of Sunrise 8: South Africa (May 17, 2010)
- In Search of Sunrise 9: India (June 6, 2011)
- In Search of Sunrise 10: Australia (June 18, 2012)
- In Search of Sunrise 11: Las Vegas (June 17, 2013)
- In Search of Sunrise 12: Dubai (June 2, 2014)
- In Search of Sunrise 13.5: Amsterdam (July 20, 2015)

=== under Markus Schulz ===
The In Search of Sunrise name re-emerged for a 14th release following a 3-year hiatus and speculated uncertainty about its future. The location subtitle was dropped, but the series retained its 3-CD format. Markus Schulz became the de facto curator for the series, having been credited on all post-Richard Durand releases through to 2022.

In 2024, the series celebrated its 25th anniversary with a 6-CD release, including mixes by Markus Schulz, Solarstone, York, Johan Gielen, Super8 & Tab and ZOYA.

- In Search of Sunrise 14: (Mixed By Markus Schulz, Andy Moor & Gabriel & Dresden) (June 29, 2018)
- In Search of Sunrise 15: (Mixed by Markus Schulz, Jerome Isma-Ae & Orkidea): (November 8, 2019)
- In Search of Sunrise 16: (Mixed by Markus Schulz, Giuseppe Ottaviani, and Sunlounger): (August 7, 2020)
- In Search of Sunrise 17: (Mixed by Markus Schulz, Kryder, and Kyau & Albert): (August 5, 2021)
- In Search of Sunrise 18: (Mixed by Markus Schulz, Matt Fax, and Dennis Sheperd): (September 2, 2022)
- In Search of Sunrise 19: (Mixed by Markus Schulz, Ilan Bluestone, and Daniel Wanrooy): (December 8, 2023)
- In Search of Sunrise 20: (Mixed by Markus Schulz, Solarstone, York, Johan Gielen, Super8 & Tab, ZOYA): (September 25, 2024)
- In Search of Sunrise 21 Mix 1: The Awakening: (Mixed by Markus Schulz): (August 6, 2025)
- In Search of Sunrise 21 Mix 2: Nirvana: (Mixed by Markus Schulz): (August 27, 2025)
- In Search of Sunrise 21 Mix 3: The Nocturnal Voyage: (Mixed by Markus Schulz): (September 17, 2025)
- In Search of Sunrise 22 Mix 1: The Awakening: (Mixed by Markus Schulz): (August 5, 2026)
- In Search of Sunrise 22 Mix 2: Nirvana: (Mixed by Markus Schulz): (August 27, 2026)
- In Search of Sunrise 22 Mix 3: The Nocturnal Voyage: (Mixed by Markus Schulz): (October 7, 2026)

== DVD ==
In the summer 2010 Tiësto released a DVD of his spring tour in Asia. From the Elements of Life World Tour and the beginning of his new world tour In Search of Sunrise: Summer Tour 2008.

The DVD includes many tracks from his In Search of Sunrise 7: Asia Album.

- Asia Tour DVD (June 21, 2010)

== Tours ==
- In Search of Sunrise: Asia Tour 2006
- In Search of Sunrise: Summer Tour 2008

== Chart positions ==
Title	Chart Positions															
Title	NED		AUT	SWI	NOR	CAN				United States Billboard					COL	MEX
Title	Top 100; Albums	Top 20; Compilations	Top 75; Albums	Top 100; Albums	Top 100; Albums	Top 100; Albums	Top 100; MON	Top 100; QUE	Top 100; OTT	Top 200; Albums	Top 200; INT	Top 200; ELEC	Top 200; IND	Top 200; HEAT	Top 200; Albums	Top 100; Albums
ISOS 4: Latin America^{April 13, 2005}	–	–	–	–	–	–	–	–	–	–	–	3	–	–	–	–
ISOS 5: Los Angeles^{April 25, 2006}	–	–	59	4	35	–	–	–	–	164	–	6	–	3	103	–
ISOS 6: Ibiza^{September 7, 2007}	–	–	46	12	–	46	–	–	–	170	–	2	–	–	–	23
ISOS 7: Asia^{June 17, 2008}	8	1	31	8	–	11	5	7	14	91	5	2	8	–	–	25
" – " denotes releases that did not chart.
INT Top Internet Albums; ELEC Top Electronic Albums; IND Top Independent Albums; HEAT Top Heatseekers; Top 200 Comprehensive Albums

== Edits and remixes ==
- "Delerium – Silence (DJ Tiësto's In Search of Sunrise Edit)"
- "Delerium – Silence (DJ Tiësto's In Search of Sunrise Remix)"
- "Delerium – Innocente (DJ Tiësto In Search of Sunrise Remix)"
- "Abnea – Velvet Moods (DJ Tiësto In Search of Sunrise Remix)"
- "Conjure One – Tears from the Moon (DJ Tiësto's In Search of Sunrise Remix)"
- "Solarstone and JES - Like a Waterfall (In Search of Sunrise Edit)"
- "Ahmet Ertenu - Why (In Search of Sunrise Edit)"
- "Gabriel & Dresden - Arcadia (In Search of Sunrise Edit)"
- "Dominic Plaza - Sounds Rushing (In Search of Sunrise Edit)"
- "Imogen Heap - Hide & Seek (Tiësto's In Search of Sunrise Remix)"
- "See Inside (Richard Durand's In Search of Sunrise Remix) Niko Pavlidis Feat. ROW"

== Singles ==
This is a list of singles released through Black Hole Recordings and any of its sub-labels, such as SongBird and Magik Muzik from the compilation series.

ISOS:

- Tiësto - Sparkles (Black Hole) 1999
- BT - Mercury & Solace (Black Hole) 1999

ISOS2:

- BT - Dreaming (Black Hole) 1999
- Kamaya Painters - Summerbreeze (Black Hole) 2000
- LN Movement - Golden Desert (SongBird / I.C.E) 2001

ISOS3: Panama

- Andain - Summer Calling (Black Hole) 2002
- Way Out West - Mindcircus (Black Hole) 2002
- Tiësto - In My Memory (Magik Muzik) 2003

ISOS4: Latin America

- Tiësto - UR (Magik Muzik) 2005
- Solarstone - Like A Waterfall (Magik Muzik) 2006

ISOS5: Los Angeles

- Estuera - Tales From The South (Magik Muzik) 2004
- Way Out West - Don't Forget Me (Black Hole) 2005
- Mark Norman - Colour My Eyes (Magik Muzik) 2006
- Global Experience - Zanzibar (Black Hole) 2006
- Progression - Technophobia (Magik Muzik) 2006
- A Boy Called Joni - Green Astronauts (Black Hole) 2006
- JES - People Will Go (Magik Muzik) 2007

ISOS6: Ibiza

- Andy Duguid - Don't Belong (Black Hole) 2007
- First State - Falling (In Trance We Trust) 2007
- Moonbeam - See The Difference Inside (SongBird) 2007
- Deadmau5 - Arguru (SongBird) 2008
- Marcus Schössow - Chase My Rabbit (Black Hole) 2008
- Progression - Different Day, Different Light (Black Hole) 2008
- Allure - Somewhere Inside (Magik Muzik) 2008
- JES - Imagination (Magik Muzik) 2008
- Clear View - Tell Me (SongBird) 2008
- Steve Forte Rio - A New Dawn (SongBird) 2008

ISOS7: Asia

- Sied van Riel - Rush (Black Hole) 2008
- Cary Brothers - Ride (SongBird) 2008
- Andy Duguid - Wasted (Black Hole) 2008
- Carl B. - Just A Thought (In Trance We Trust) 2008
- Zoo Brazil - Crossroads (Avanti) 2008
- JPL - Whenever I May Find Her (In Trance We Trust) 2008
- Airbase - Denial (In Trance We Trust) 2008
- Beltek - Kenta (Avanti) 2008
- Allure - Power of You (Magik Muzik) 2008
