= In Search of Sunrise 12: Dubai =

Compilation album by Richard Durand with Lange
- Released: June 2, 2014
- Genre: Trance, Dance
- Length: 3:50:38 (Total); 1:17:59 (Disc 1); 1:18:29 (Disc 2); 1:14:10 (Disc 3)
- Label: SongBird

In Search of Sunrise chronology
| In Search of Sunrise 11: Las Vegas (2013) | In Search of Sunrise 12: Dubai (2014) | In Search of Sunrise 13.5: Amsterdam (2015) |

Richard Durand chronology
| Portrait (2013) | In Search of Sunrise 12: Dubai (2014) | In Search of Sunrise 13.5: Amsterdam (2015) |

In Search of Sunrise 12: Dubai is a compilation album by Dutch trance producer Richard Durand in collaboration with Lange. It was released on June 2, 2014 by SongBird. It is the twelfth installment in the In Search of Sunrise compilation series.

== Track listing ==
Disc one
| No. | Title | Artist | Length |
|---|---|---|---|
| 1. | "Dubai Desert Fish" (Intro Mix) | Richard Durand | 1:58 |
| 2. | "Day And Night" | Azotti feat. Bagga Bownz | 4:14 |
| 3. | "The Space Between" (Santerna Remix) | Jeremy Vancaulart, Assaf feat. Laura Aqui | 7:04 |
| 4. | "Ocean Drive" (Savid Remix) | Talamanca | 4:28 |
| 5. | "Chasing Stars" | Somna & Yang Feat. Michele C | 5:46 |
| 6. | "Whatever You Like" | Kam Delight | 4:41 |
| 7. | "Shield Of Faith" | Richard Durand & Cynthia Hall | 5:40 |
| 8. | "Lost Soul" | Nomosk & Roman Messer Feat. Christina Novelli | 5:58 |
| 9. | "Take A Moment" | Sean Tyas | 6:21 |
| 10. | "Higher" (Hazem Beltagui Remix) | Rafael Frost & Jennifer Rene | 5:49 |
| 11. | "Luminance" | Driftmoon | 4:19 |
| 12. | "Epic" | Ram | 5:01 |
| 13. | "Come With Me" | Ronny K Vs Ren | 6:42 |
| 14. | "Sambuca" | Richard Durand | 4:14 |
| 15. | "Sphinx" | Faruk Sabanci & James Dymond | 5:51 |
| Total length: | | | 1:17:59 |

Disc two
| No. | Title | Artist | Length |
|---|---|---|---|
| 1. | "Atlantis" (Intro Mix) | Richard Durand | 1:46 |
| 2. | "Eve" | Gai Barone | 3:42 |
| 3. | "Better In Time" | IRA & Paulina Dubaj | 5:11 |
| 4. | "Forever In Our Hearts" (David Broaders Remix) | Ruden De Ronde | 4:55 |
| 5. | "I Go On" | Moonbeam feat. Polina Griffith | 4:30 |
| 6. | "Cocoa" (Trance Mix) | Alex O'Rion | 5:24 |
| 7. | "Ten Thousand Suns" | High 5 feat. Nanje Nowack | 4:09 |
| 8. | "Into The Light" | Adam Kancerski feat. Aneym | 4:40 |
| 9. | "Karma" | Sunny Lax | 5:08 |
| 10. | "Imagination" (Cold Rush Remix) | Roman Messer feat. Ange | 5:20 |
| 11. | "The Inquisitor" | Driftmoon | 4:09 |
| 12. | "Beyond Horizons" | ReOrder | 5:30 |
| 13. | "Seldarine" | Elfsong | 6:26 |
| 14. | "Step Into My World" | Amir Hussain & Allen Watts | 4:45 |
| 15. | "On Her Behalf" | Dimension | 6:45 |
| 16. | "Amatoria" | Ferrin & Morris | 6:16 |
| Total length: | | | 1:18:29 |

Disc three
| No. | Title | Artist | Length |
|---|---|---|---|
| 1. | "Contact" | Danilo Ercole | 4:00 |
| 2. | "Hussar" | Max Freegrant Feat. Matrey | 3:07 |
| 3. | "Just Be" (Kris O Neil Remix) | Tiësto feat. Kirsty Hawkshaw | 5:00 |
| 4. | "Verano" | Dimension | 3:28 |
| 5. | "The Recluse" | Johnny Yono | 4:00 |
| 6. | "Fade To Light" | Andy Moor | 5:02 |
| 7. | "Quantum" (Future Disciple Remix I) | Bissen | 4:40 |
| 8. | "Carnivale" | Michael Badal | 4:29 |
| 9. | "Firebird" | Tangle | 4:39 |
| 10. | "Hey! While The Sun Shines" | Lange & Lng | 3:05 |
| 11. | "History" | Andy Duguid Feat. Jaren | 3:52 |
| 12. | "Never Far" (Radio Edit) | Ari Kyle & Audioscape Feat. Simon Latham | 4:09 |
| 13. | "Vilnius" | Anske | 4:17 |
| 14. | "Out Of Coverage" | Bobina | 3:51 |
| 15. | "Dreamcatcher" | Anske | 3:06 |
| 16. | "A Different Shade Of Crazy" (Lange Vs. Refracture Breaks Mashup) | Lange | 4:27 |
| 17. | "Zeal" (In Search Of Sunrise Mix) | Mateusz | 4:52 |
| 18. | "Melbourne" | David Gravell | 4:17 |
| Total length: | | | 1:14:10 |
