= Karanda =

Karanda may refer to:

- Karanda (band), a dance music group
- Karanda, Iran, a village in Iran
- Karanda (shrub), a plant
