= Azotti =

Ukrainian DJ (born 1985)

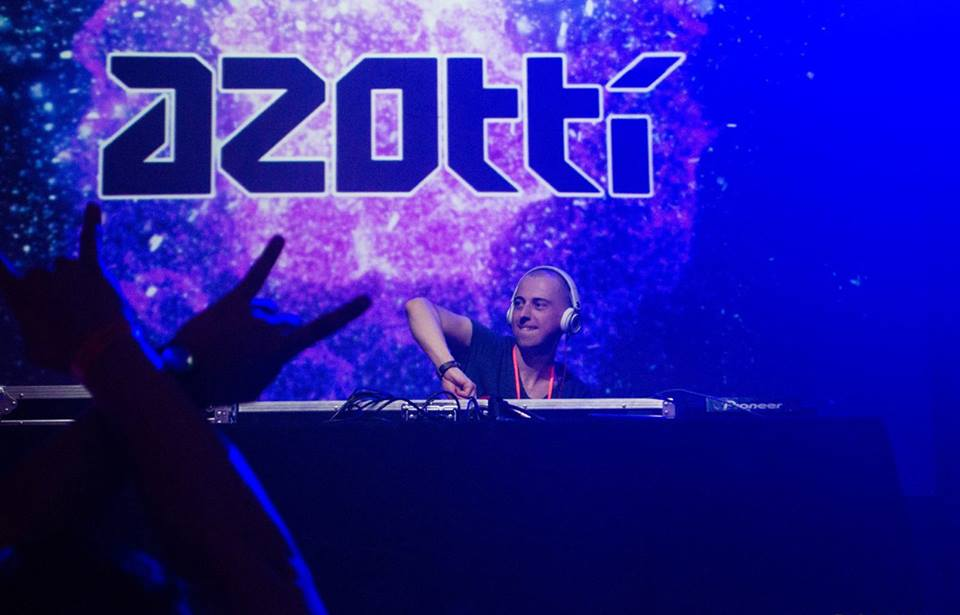

Background information
- Born: Yuri Denysenko; February 23, 1985 (age 40)
- Origin: Kyiv, Ukraine
- Genres: Progressive Trance; Progressive House; Uplifting Trance; Melodic House; Melodic Techno
- Years active: 2009–present
- Labels: Black Hole Recordings; Magik Muzik; SongBird; Mondo Records; Fenology Records; How Trance Works
- Website: facebook.com/AzottiOfficial

Azotti (born Yuri Denysenko; Ukrainian: Юрій Денисенко) is a Ukrainian electronic dance music DJ and Sound Producer.

Azotti has released music on labels such as Black Hole Recordings, Magik Muzik, SongBird, Mondo Records, Fenology Records and Sir Adrian Music (How Trance Works). His tracks have been repeatedly supported by top DJs such as Fatboy Slim, Tiesto, Armin van Buuren, Paul van Dyk, Paul Oakenfold, Cosmic Gate, Richard Durand, Markus Schulz and Many More.

== Biography ==
Azotti was born in Kyiv, Ukraine, on 23 February 1985, and grew up in Litky (a small village on the outskirts of Kyiv).

He attended college, and later The Interregional Academy of Personnel Management, to study Accountancy. During these years Azotti showed more and more interest in sound engineering and creating music. In 2009 he became a resident DJ for one of Kyiv's clubs, Tusse, where he worked and performed for nearly 2 years. In 2011 he released his first single, “Morphology”, which was played for weeks on Sunshine Radio Germany, and for which he received great support from the world's top DJs.

After releasing several successful tracks and remixes, he collaborated with world-renowned Dutch rock band Eller Van Buuren with Bagga Bownz. The result of this collaboration was the track "Day and Night", included on the 2014 Richard Durand compilation In Search of Sunrise 12: Dubai. "Day and Night".

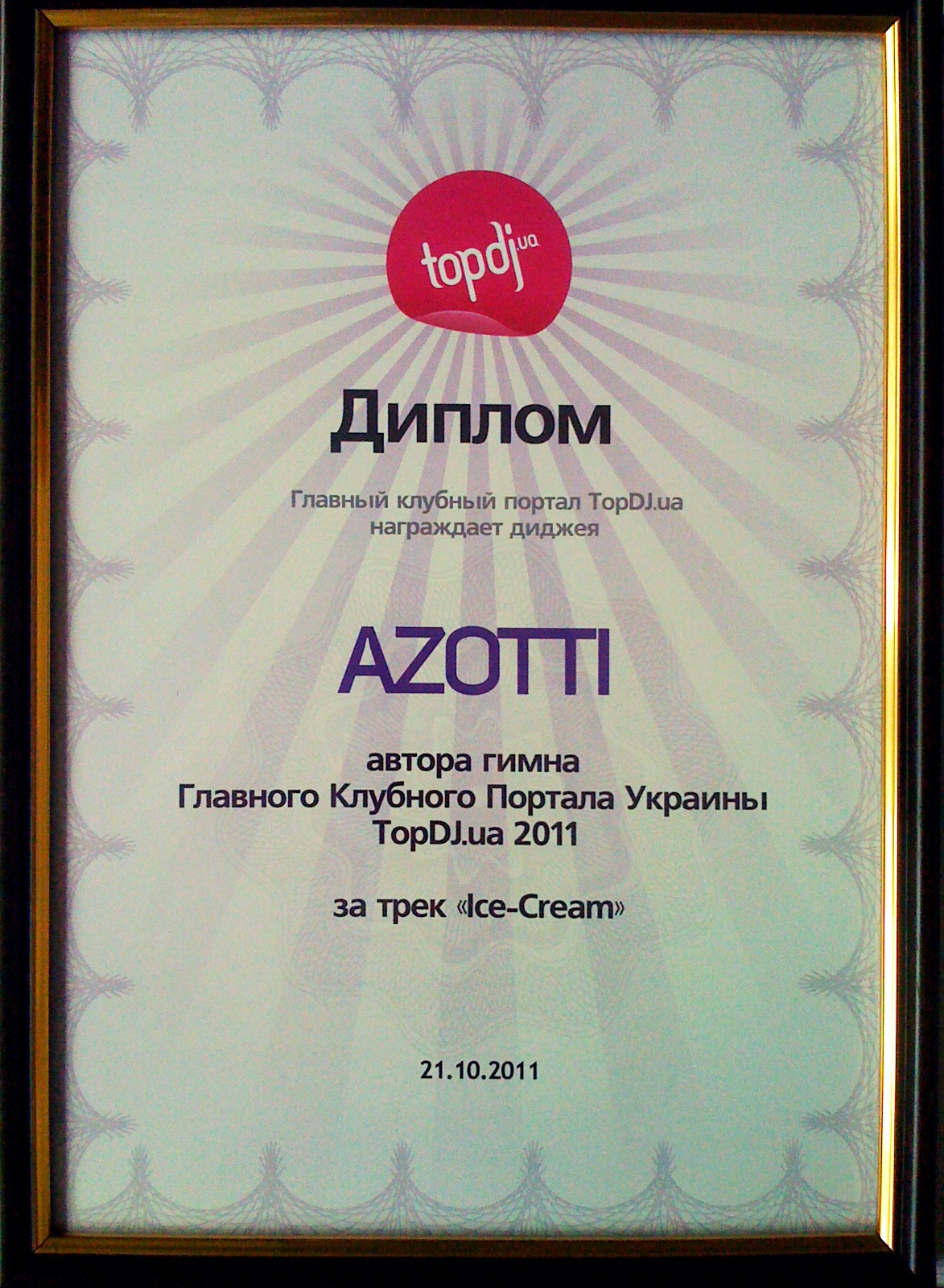
The award Azotti received for the Best Track that became the anthem of Ukrainian rating and portal Topdj.ua

Azotti's music is played regularly on Ukrainian and world radio stations such as "Digitally Imported", "Afterhours.FM", "KISS FM Ukraine" and "DJFM Ukraine", as well as on widely-listened-to radio shows such as A State Of Trance and Anjunabeats Worldwide. Azotti has twice (2010, 2011) composed the theme for the main website for Ukrainian DJs, Topdj.ua, a site through which he has won multiple DJing contests. Azotti has also won many competitions in Ukraine, including a remix contest for the band SKAY, which he won with his track "Love". Over several years and until today Azotti is a resident of several projects in Kyiv's Nightclubs Saxon and Forsage.

On April 15, 2023, he is presented the new project WHITE STAR and released a debut Vinyl Mini-Album in new alias. The record was released in Holland, the publication was personally supported by the director of the label 'Black Hole Recordings' Arny Bink. It was announced that the money from the sale of vinyl will be used to help the Armed Forces of Ukraine fighting against Russian invaders.

== Discography ==
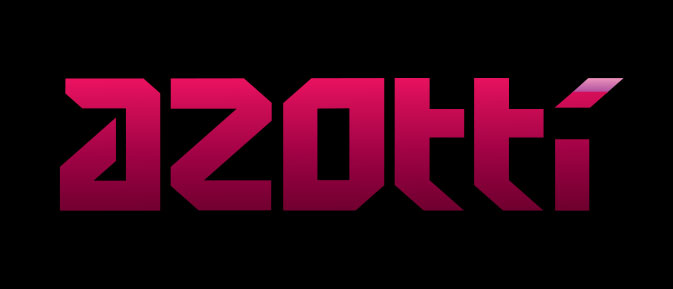
Logotype Azotti

=== Singles ===
2011

- Morphology [Redux Recordings]

2012

- The Miracle [Mondo Records]

2013

- Shark [Mondo Records]
- Coffee [Mondo Records]

2014

- Dew Point (vs. MalYar) [Sir Adrian Music]
- Black Forest (vs. WvE pres. Anna Lee) [Fenology Records]
- Color Fields (vs. Kago Pengchi) [Mondo Records]

2015

- Day And Night (feat. Bagga Bownz) [ Black Hole Recordings – SongBird ]
- Back Again [ Mondo Records ]
- First Kiss [ SongBird ]

2016

- Fallen Dreams (з Bagga Bownz) [ Black Hole Recordings ]
- Desna (vs. Cyanlight) [Mondo Records]

2017

- Aurora Borealis [ Club Family Records ]

2018

- Azotti - Sultry City [8Music]
- Azotti - Butterfly [Mondo Records]
- Azotti vs. Reese - Braveheart [Elliptical Sun Melodies]

2019

- Azotti & Darren Tate - The Solstice [Mondo Records]

2021

- Message from Ibiza (& Reese) [Yeiskomp Records]

2023

- MCMLXXXV [Magik Muzik]
- First Kiss (2022 Peaceful Remaster) [Magik Muzik]

== Album ==
2023

- WHITE STAR - MCMLXXXV (Mini Album, LP, [Black Hole Recordings])

=== Remixes ===
2012

- Zaa & Straight Up – Many Reasons [Cloudland Music]
- Anna Lee vs. Alex Teeb – One Summer Day [Pure Magic Recordings]

2013

- Tim Besamusca & Dj T.H. feat. Three Faces – You Got Me [Trance All-Stars Recordings]

2014

- Azotti – The Miracle (Remixes) [Mondo Records]
- Walsh & McAuley & Katty Heath – Wider Horizon [Sir Adrian Music]
- DT8 Project – Forever In A Day [Mondo Records]

2015

- Kenneth Thomas & Ray Violet - Amanecer [IAMPHOENIX]
- Bagga Bownz - Cereal (Azotti Remix)

2017

- Desna (vs. Cyanlight) (Atraxia Remix) [Mondo Records]

== See also ==
- Black Hole Recordings
- SongBird
