= Glenn Morrison =

Glenn Morrison may refer to:

- Glenn Morrison (rugby league)
- Glenn Morrison (DJ)
