= In Search of Sunrise 9: India =

Compilation album by Richard Durand
- Released: 6 June 2011
- Genres: Trance, progressive trance, progressive house
- Label: SongBird

In Search of Sunrise chronology
In Search of Sunrise 8: South Africa (2010)	In Search of Sunrise 9: India (2011)	In Search of Sunrise 10: Australia (2012)

Richard Durand chronology
Wide Awake (2011)	In Search of Sunrise 9: India (2011)	In Search of Sunrise 10: Australia (2012)

In Search of Sunrise 9: India is a compilation album by Dutch trance producer Richard Durand. It was released on 6 June 2011 by SongBird. It is the ninth installment in the In Search of Sunrise compilation series. On 31 May 2011 Richard Durand released a 35-second teaser preview of the compilation on MySpace.

== Track listing ==
Disc one
No.	Title	Artist(s)	Length
1.	"All Good Things" (Prayag & Rishab Intro Mix)	Lost Stories
2.	"Tonight"	Ad Brown, Mango, and Kerry Leva
3.	"Craters of the Moon"	Alex O'Rion
4.	"In Deep" (In Search of Sunrise Edit)	Pulser featuring Molly Bancroft
5.	"Hold Me Tight"	Zoo Brazil featuring Rasmus Kellerman
6.	"Circular Progression"	Vinson
7.	"Avatar"	Venaccio & Daigon
8.	"Ice Coffee"	Moonpax
9.	"Summerlives"	Mike Saint-Jules presents Saint X featuring Sandel
10.	"Inflection"	Craving
11.	"Point of No Return"	René Martens
12.	"Eliminate"	Thomas Coastline
13.	"Solace"	Save the Robot
14.	"Run To You"	Richard Durand featuring Hadley
15.	"Elsewhere"	Jason van Wyk & JPL

Disc two
No.	Title	Artist(s)	Length
1.	"Golden Langur"	Supermind
2.	"Fire In My Head"	Jorg Zimmer featuring Eva Kade
3.	"Seven"	Silence Groove
4.	"Still I Wait" (Richard Durand's In Search of Sunrise Remix)	Jonas Steur featuring Jennifer Rene
5.	"Summer Memories"	Craving
6.	"Falling Deep" (Extended Mix)	George Acosta featuring Emma Lock
7.	"The Sky Is The Limit"	Tom Cloud
8.	"Diamonds In The Sky"	Richard Durand featuring Julie Thompson
9.	"Strings"	Andy Duguid featuring Fenja
10.	"Rise Up Again"	Alex O'Rion
11.	"Bangalore"	Daniel Wanrooy
12.	"Viva La Revolución"	Sunny Lax
13.	"Wheels Up"	Dragon & Jontron
14.	"In The Air"	DNS Project Presents Bigroom
15.	"Arrivals"	Mark Sixma
