= N-R-G (G-Spott song) =

2001 single

Single by G-Spott

from the album N-R-G
- Released: April 4, 2001
- Genre: Euro house
- Length: 3:26
- Label: Simsalabim; N-Vertigo
- Producers: L.T.R. van Schooneveld; The House Negro

G-Spott singles chronology
"Melo-G" (2001)	"N-R-G" (2001)	"G-Licious" (2002)

"N-R-G" is a single by Dutch disc jockey and producer Richard Durand under the nickname G-Spott. It is the second single of G-Spott's studio album of the same name.

== Track listing ==
=== Maxi-single and download ===
1. "N-R-G - Radio Version" — 3:26"
2. "N-R-G - Club Version" — 6:14
3. "N-R-G - Club Version Vocal" — 6:13
4. "N-R-G - DJ Stephen Remix" — 8:39
5. "N-R-G - S.A.M. Remix" — 5:11

=== 12" vinyl ===
1. "N-R-G - Club Version" — 6:14
2. "N-R-G - Club Version Vocal" — 6:13
3. "N-R-G - DJ Stephen Remix" — 8:39
4. "N-R-G - S.A.M. Remix" — 5:11

== Sample credits ==
- The song samples the Klubbheads Euro Remix of Discohopping
- The song samples Start & Stop 1 by Best Service

== Notes ==
- Dutch professional darts player Maik Kuivenhoven uses the song as his walk-on song.
- It was added to the compilation album: The Ultimate Dance Top 100 Vol

== Chart performance ==
Chart (2003)	Peak position
United Kingdom (OCC)	28
