= Karanda (band) =

British trance music project

- Origin: Leicester, Worthing, United Kingdom
- Genres: Trance, progressive trance, progressive house, big room house
- Years active: 2008 - 2014; 2015 - present
- Labels: Enhanced Music, Coldharbour, Raz Nitzan Music
- Members: James Wood, Andrew Curd
- Website: www.karandamusic.com/

Karanda is a UK music project consisting of producer/DJ James Wood from Leicester, United Kingdom and Andrew Curd from Worthing, United Kingdom.

== Biography ==
Karanda’s journey began in 2004, with James and Andi meeting online in an old mIRC chat room. Andi was the first DJ to truly support James’ music. James had early solo success signing with Andy Moor’s AVA record label, and received numerous support from Judge Jules on BBC Radio 1. In 2008, Karanda was born.

Their first track self-titled ’Karanda' received support from Armin van Buuren, and 'Shuffle' gained support from Judge Jules. Their first vocal track ‘On Hold’ featuring David Call was signed by Markus Schulz to Coldharbour, with numerous support from Rank 1, Sander van Doorn and many more. They remixed Markus Schulz’s 'Last Man Standing'. Later in 2011, they remixed Bart Claessen's 2010 track 'Hartseer' for Ferry Corsten’s ‘Full On Ferry’ compilation, gaining support from Above & Beyond. They travelled around the UK and Europe with shows in London, Amsterdam, Poznan and more.

Karanda received the opportunity to officially remix Ellie Goulding's 'Beating Heart' from the Divergent film with their friend Andrew Wilson ('Offset'), and it was set to be released through Universal Music, but unfortunately the single release was cancelled. However, their remix still received airplay on Capital FM and KISS.

Having signed tracks with Armada, AVA and Coldharbour, Karanda signed with Enhanced Music in late 2011, where things really took off. With singles such as ‘Titan’ and ‘Kingpin’, a collaboration with Juventa, and remixes for Audien and Estiva, they gained further support from Above & Beyond, Paul van Dyk, Tritonal, tyDi, Cosmic Gate, Lange, Darude, and many more. Collaborations with Kathy Fisher, Store N Forward, Mike Shiver, Alana Aldea and more have proven to further show the diversity of the Karanda sound.

In 2016, Matt Darey got in touch after enjoying ‘Supreme’ on Rafael Frost’s record label, and they then remixed his single ‘Keep Talking’. Since then, James and Matt (both from Leicester) have gotten together on numerous occasions, and James was honoured to help recreate Matt’s legendary singles ‘Gamemaster’ and ‘Beautiful’ in order for Matt to perform them in Dolby Atmos 3D surround.

Karanda currently host The Karanda Show every month on Afterhours.FM, and The Karanda Mix every week on Mixcloud.

== Discography ==
=== Singles ===
- 2009 Karanda (Inov8)
- 2009 In Motion (Coldharbour Recordings)
- 2010 Shuffle (Inspired Digital)
- 2010 On Hold (Feat. David Call) (Coldharbour Recordings)
- 2010 Sphinx / Grumpy But Gorgeous EP (Lyon Echo Records)
- 2010 Curveball (Neuroscience Recordings)
- 2010 Tonight (AVA Blue)
- 2011 Crashing (Feat. Sopheary) (Coldharbour Recordings)
- 2011 Coming Closer (Feat. Radmilla) (AVA Blue)
- 2012 Roll Out (Armada Music)
- 2012 Infectious / Momentum EP (Enhanced Progressive)
- 2012 Cloud Nine (Alter Ego Records)
- 2012 Skyfall (Alter Ego Records)
- 2012 Titan (Enhanced Progressive)
- 2012 Agony (Feat. Laura Shea) (Enhanced Progressive)
- 2013 Hijinx / Stronghold EP (Enhanced Progressive)
- 2013 Rebuffer (With Erick Strong) (Interstate Recordings)
- 2013 Banshee / Zazzy EP (Enhanced Progressive)
- 2013 Ethereal (With Juventa & Roxanne Barton) (Enhanced Progressive)
- 2013 Whopper (Enhanced Progressive)
- 2013 Nut'n (Starblocks Music)
- 2013 Kingpin (Enhanced Progressive)
- 2014 It's Now (With Alana Aldea) (Amsterdam Trance Records)
- 2014 Soup Therapy (With Store N Forward) (Afterglow)
- 2014 Krank (Enhanced Recordings)
- 2015 Supreme (Frost Recordings)
- 2015 Phoenix (Captured Music)
- 2016 Soulseeker (Captured Music)
- 2016 I Like You (With Mike Shiver) (Captured Music)
- 2016 Galileo (With D&W) (Macarize)
- 2017 Quest (Essentializm)
- 2018 Psionic (Essentializm)
- 2018 Gone (With Fisher) (RNM)
- 2018 Sirens (Essentializm)
- 2018 Rain (With Fisher) (RNM)
- 2019 Still Got Time (With Sarah Russell) (RNM)
- 2019 Lumen (Elliptical Sun Recordings)
- 2019 Excelsior! / Vita (AVA Recordings)
- 2019 Animus (Elliptical Sun Recordings)
- 2020 Melodium (Elliptical Sun Recordings)
- 2020 Kindred (Enhanced Progressive)
- 2020 Odyssey / Voyage (With Zuubi) (Elliptical Sun Recordings)
- 2020 Beyond (Enhanced Progressive)
- 2020 Fusion (Elliptical Sun Recordings)
- 2020 Dreamstate (Elliptical Sun Recordings)
- 2021 Longing (Enhanced Progressive)

=== Remixes ===
- 2010 Code 64 - Stasis (Karanda Remix) (Progress Productions)
- 2011 Peter Lesko - Homerun (Karanda Remix) (Alter Ego Digital)
- 2011 Markus Schulz Feat. Khaz - Last Man Standing (Karanda Remix)
- 2011 Bart Claessen - Hartseer (Karanda Remix) (Flashover Recordings)
- 2011 Akira Kayosa & Hugh Tolland Feat. Stine Grove - Drifter (Karanda Remix) (Perceptive Recordings)
- 2012 Boxer - Carden (Karanda Remix) (Always Alive Recordings)
- 2012 Rater - Imagine (Karanda Remix) (Nanobeats Records)
- 2012 Audien - Keep This Memory (Karanda Remix) (Enhanced Progressive)
- 2012 Fast Distance - Alpine (Karanda Remix) (Digital Society Recordings)
- 2012 Fredda.L & Sandra Passero - Charades (Karanda Remix) (Enhanced Progressive)
- 2012 Matt Davey Feat. Lo-Fi Sugar - Higher Ground (Karanda Remix) (Amsterdam Trance Records)
- 2012 Estiva & Tania Zygar - Death Of Me (Karanda Remix) (Enhanced Recordings)
- 2012 Thomas Shore & Innee - Evaporate (Karanda Remix) (Nu Communicate Recordings)
- 2012 Solis & Sean Truby Feat. Andy Tau - Summer Heights (Karanda Remix) (InfraProgressive)
- 2012 Nitrous Oxide & Hodel - Safe (Karanda Remix) (Infrasonic Recordings)
- 2013 Lee Canning - Paradigm (Karanda Remix) (Amon Vision)
- 2013 Andy Duguid Feat. Audrey Gallagher - In This Moment (Karanda Remix) (Magik Muzik)
- 2014 Nevel & Dunky - Zulu (Karanda Remix)
- 2014 Kebu - Deep Blue (Karanda Remix) (Secret Entertainment)
- 2016 Matt Darey & Somn3um Feat. Molly Bancroft - Keep Talking (Karanda Remix) [Somn'thing Records]
- 2020 JPL- A Better Daze (Karanda Remix) (Enhanced Progressive)
- 2020 Airo & Robert B - The Distant (Karanda Remix) (Elliptical Sun Recordings)
- 2021 Steve Brian & Trove - Lie To Yourself (Karanda Remix) (Enhanced Progressive)
