= In Search of Sunrise 11: Las Vegas =

Compilation album by Richard Durand with Myon & Shane 54
- Released: June 3, 2013
- Genre: Trance, Dance
- Length: 5:02:42 (Total); 106:54 (Disc 1); 103:27 (Disc 2); 92:21 (Disc 3)
- Label: SongBird

In Search of Sunrise chronology
| In Search of Sunrise 10: Australia (2012) | In Search of Sunrise 11: Las Vegas (2013) | In Search of Sunrise 12: Dubai (2014) |

Richard Durand chronology
| Richard Durand vs. the World (2012) | In Search of Sunrise 11: Las Vegas (2013) | Portrait (2013) |

In Search of Sunrise 11: Las Vegas is a compilation album by Dutch trance producer Richard Durand in collaboration with Hungarian duo Myon & Shane 54. It was released on June 3, 2013 by SongBird. It is the eleventh installment in the In Search of Sunrise compilation series.

== Track listing ==
Disc one
| No. | Title | Richard Durand | Length |
|---|---|---|---|
| 1. | "See Inside" (Richard Durand's In Search of Sunrise Remix) | Niko Pavlidis Feat. ROW | 4:08 |
| 2. | "Hanging in the Air" | Silence Groove | 7:42 |
| 3. | "Nightlight" (Santerna Remix) | Sydney Blu, JD and Betsie Larkin | 7:22 |
| 4. | "Kingfisher" | Joshi | 6:58 |
| 5. | "Heart Breaking" | Max Roelse & Two Killers Feat. Ange | 6:22 |
| 6. | "Ester" | The Flyers | 6:40 |
| 7. | "I Loved You" | Steve Kaetzel Feat. Emma Lock | 7:24 |
| 8. | "In Time" (Radio Edit) | AWD | 4:07 |
| 9. | "Running On Empty" (Richard Durand's In Search of Sunrise Edit) | Richard Durand and Neev Kennedy | 7:08 |
| 10. | "Krysta" | Rocking J and Pedro Del Mar | 7:09 |
| 11. | "Skin & Bones" | Andy Duguid & Julie Thompson | 6:19 |
| 12. | "New Universe" | Stas Isometrica Feat. Edward Lytkin | 7:04 |
| 13. | "Pontius Pilate" (Lence & Pluton Remix) | Tamra Keenan | 7:08 |
| 14. | "Flare" | Craving | 6:53 |
| 15. | "Magenta" | Giuseppe Ottaviani with Ferry Corsten | 5:33 |
| 16. | "You Once Told Me" (Walsh & McAuley Remix) | Andain | 9:00 |
| Total length: | | | 106:57 |

Disc two
| No. | Title | Richard Durand | Length |
|---|---|---|---|
| 1. | "These Dreams" (Richard Durand's In Search of Sunrise Remix) | George Acosta Feat. Shakeh | 3:10 |
| 2. | "Floe" (Alex O'Rion Remix) | Steve Kaetzel | 6:23 |
| 3. | "Every Other Way" (Johan Malmgren Remix) | BT Feat. JES | 7:07 |
| 4. | "Madness" (Exclusive Club Mix) | Moonbeam Feat. Avis Vox | 7:18 |
| 5. | "Cala Conta" | Cyre | 6:52 |
| 6. | "When You Loved Me" | Boom Jinx, Maor Levi and Ashley Tomberlin | 6:14 |
| 7. | "Never Maybe" (Radio Edit) | Sequentia presents Daniel Garrick | 3:06 |
| 8. | "One More Time" (Walsh & McAuley Dub Mix) | Motif Feat. Naemi Joy | 6:35 |
| 9. | "Hold Me Now" (Pedro Del Mar & DoubleV Instrumental Remix) | Pedro Del Mar and Spark7 Feat. Jane Kumada | 5:49 |
| 10. | "Summer Inside" | Meridian | 8:12 |
| 11. | "Las Vegas" (In Search of Sunrise Anthem) | Richard Durand and Eximinds | 5:53 |
| 12. | "Don't Look Back" | Alex O'Rion | 5:37 |
| 13. | "Sunstar" | Tom8 vs. Luke Ryan | 6:16 |
| 14. | "Hope & Pray" | Jace Williams | 6:44 |
| 15. | "Lifelines" | Allen Watts | 9:06 |
| 16. | "Hayabusa" (Radio Edit) | Falcon | 3:52 |
| 17. | "Storm Chaser" (KhoMha Remix) | Cosmic Gate | 5:13 |
| Total length: | | | 103:27 |

Disc three
| No. | Title | Myon & Shane 54 | Length |
|---|---|---|---|
| 1. | "Hurricane" (Radio Edit) | Myon & Shane 54 Feat. Amy Pearson | 3:39 |
| 2. | "Up" | Michael Myers and Astrid Suryanto | 7:14 |
| 3. | "Lights" (Cole Plante Radio Edit) | Myon & Shane 54 and Aruna | 3:32 |
| 4. | "Wayfarer" | Audien | 6:00 |
| 5. | "Alchemy" (Myon & Shane 54 Redemption Mix) | Above & Beyond Feat. Zoë Johnston | 9:07 |
| 6. | "Are You Gonna Love Me" (Radio Edit) | Mike Danis | 4:01 |
| 7. | "When You Loved Me" | Boom Jinx, Maor Levi and Ashley Tomberlin | 6:14 |
| 8. | "Get On the Move" | Moonbeam Feat. Pryce Oliver | 6:57 |
| 9. | "City of LIghts" (Radio Edit) | LTN | 3:51 |
| 10. | "We Are True" (Radio Edit) | Mike Danis | 3:41 |
| 11. | "Outshine" (Radio Edit) | Myon & Shane 54 and Natalie Peris | 4:22 |
| 12. | "Copycat" (Radio Edit) | The Madison | 3:52 |
| 13. | "Banger" (Radio Edit) | Coe | 3:48 |
| 14. | "Stella Polare" (Radio Edit) | Juventa | 3:50 |
| 15. | "Vampire" (Eximinds Extended Edit) | Myon & Shane 54 Feat. Carrie Skipper | 6:27 |
| 16. | "What Happens There" (Radio Edit) | SNR | 3:26 |
| 17. | "The Strip" (Radio Edit) | Juventa | 3:53 |
| 18. | "Just Be" (Radio Edit) | Tiësto Feat. Kirsty Hawkshaw | 3:11 |
| 19. | "Sailing Stones" (Myon & Shane 54 Ambient Mix) | Myon & Shane 54 | 5:16 |
| Total length: | | | 92:21 |
