= In Search of Sunrise 6: Ibiza =

Compilation album by Tiësto
- Released: September 7, 2007
- Recorded: Summer 2007
- Genres: Trance, progressive trance
- Length: 2:34:51 (Total); 1:18:04 (Disc 1); 1:16:46 (Disc 2)
- Labels: Black Hole; Songbird
- Producer: Tiësto

In Search of Sunrise chronology
In Search of Sunrise 5: Los Angeles (2006)	In Search of Sunrise 6: Ibiza (2007)	In Search of Sunrise 7: Asia (2008)

Tiësto chronology
Elements of Life (2007)	In Search of Sunrise 6: Ibiza (2007)	Elements of Life: Remixed (2008)

In Search of Sunrise 6: Ibiza (also known as ISOS 6) is the sixth album in the In Search of Sunrise series mixed by trance DJ/producer Tiësto, released on 7 September 2007 in the Netherlands and 16 October 2007 in the United States as a double disc album. This information was confirmed on 31 July 2007 on Tiësto's website. Many file-sharing websites, earlier in 2007, released a fake torrent of In Search of Sunrise 6, labeled In Search of Sunrise 6 - London, which even included a CD cover. This was quickly noted as a fake as information of the CD had not been released via Tiësto's website nor the In Search of Sunrise series website. A special release party was held at the Heineken Music Hall in Amsterdam on 3 November 2007. Like previous In Search of Sunrise albums, this album contains a special slipcase. The album picture was taken by Stephanie Pistel. The compilation was awarded in the 2008 WMC Awards in Miami, it won for "Best Full Length DJ Mix CD".

== Production ==
Inspiration to produce this album came from returning to Ibiza after a two-year stint in June 2007. This album was produced in 2007 during the summer time the old-fashioned way as Tiësto stated on his website. Tiësto used CD mixers and did not use any programs or computer gadgets. Tiësto also stated on his website on 13 August 2007, "Most of the tracks are so exclusive that, if I'd still be mixing with records, I wouldn't have been able to get those productions on vinyl!" On 17 August 2007 on Tiësto's MySpace blog, a thirty-second promotional video was released on YouTube.

== Track listing ==
In Search of Sunrise 6: Ibiza Disc 1
No.	Title	Artist(s)	Length
1.	"La Hacienda"	Es Vedrá	2:27
2.	"Contact"	Glenn Morrison	3:27
3.	"Don't Belong"	Andy Duguid featuring Leah	5:26
4.	"Vice" (Sydenham Dub)	Solaris Heights	6:10
5.	"Madras"	Global Experience	4:56
6.	"Summerfish" (Scandall Sunset On Ibiza Mix)	Leonid Rudenko	5:40
7.	"Tell Me"	Clear View featuring Jessica	4:26
8.	"Searching For Truth"	The Veil Kings	5:40
9.	"The Sun'll Shine" (Sunrise Mix)	Ohmna	6:54
10.	"See The Difference Inside" (Inside Mix)	Moonbeam	5:25
11.	"Somewhere Inside of Me"	Allure featuring Julie Thompson	8:00
12.	"High Glow"	Taxigirl	7:01
13.	"Lonely"	Reeves featuring Alanah	5:02
14.	"Hide & Seek" (Tiësto's In Search of Sunrise Remix)	Imogen Heap	7:26
Total length:			1:18:04

Note: Allure featuring Julie Thompson - "Somewhere Inside of Me" later on became known only as "Somewhere Inside" when it was released as a single.

Note: Glenn Morrison - "Contact" is actually a collaboration between Glenn Morrison and Joel Zimmerman with Joel Zimmerman credited as a co writer/producer and Glenn Morrison as the Artist.

In Search of Sunrise 6: Ibiza Disc 2
No.	Title	Artist(s)	Length
1.	"A New Dawn"	Steve Forte Rio	2:36
2.	"What You Need" (NC's In Love With Prog Mix)	Nic Chagall	5:56
3.	"Trozitos de Navidad" (Primavera Remix)	Marc Marzenit	4:58
4.	"Don't Speak"	John Dahlbäck	3:38
5.	"Arguru"	Deadmau5	5:19
6.	"Falling"	First State featuring Anita Kelsey	7:44
7.	"Fall To Pieces"	Jonas Steur featuring Jennifer Rene	6:31
8.	"Imagination" (Tiësto Remix)	JES	6:16
9.	"Mercury Room"	Tom Cloud	7:09
10.	"Chase My Rabbit"	Marcus Schossow	6:16
11.	"Reflect"	Maor Levi	6:31
12.	"Different Day, Different Light"	Progression	4:13
13.	"Dancing Water"	Jedidja	7:56
14.	"Breathing"	D'Alt Vila	1:36
Total length:			1:16:46

== Samplers ==
ISOS6:Ibiza limited edition vinyl sampler cover

On 15 and 25 August two samplers exclusive to Beatport were released with four songs each. On 29 August 2007 Tiësto released a limited edition vinyl sampler that included all 8 songs from the first two samplers, which was made available online, a third sampler was released in Netherlands as a CD.

Limited Edition Sampler 1
No.	Title	Length
1.	"Andy Duguid featuring Leah - Don't Belong"	8:22
2.	"Global Experience - Madras"	7:58
3.	"The Veil Kings - Searching For Truth"	6:27
4.	"Moonbeam - See The Difference Inside (Inside Mix)"	7:44

Limited Edition Sampler 2
No.	Title	Length
1.	"Reeves featuring Alanah - Lonely"	7:20
2.	"Deadmau5 - Arguru"	7:10
3.	"Tom Cloud - Mercury Room"	9:01
4.	"Jedidja - Dancing Water"	11:29

Limited Edition Vinyl Sampler
No.	Title	Length
1.	"Moonbeam - See The Difference Inside (Inside Mix)"	7:43
2.	"Taxi Girl - High Glow"	8:51
3.	"Reeves featuring Alanah - Lonely"	7:19
4.	"Tom Cloud - Mercury Room"	9:01
5.	"Marcus Schössow - Chase My Rabbit"	8:49
6.	"Progression - Different Day, Different Light"	6:20
7.	"Jedidja - Dancing Water"	11:29
8.	"D'Alt Vila - Breathing"	2:05

== Charts ==
=== Weekly charts ===
Weekly chart performance
Chart (2007)	Peak position
Australian Dance Albums (ARIA)	13
Austrian Albums (Ö3 Austria)	46
Belgian Compilation Albums (Ultratop Flanders)	5
Belgian Compilation Albums (Ultratop Wallonia)	2
Canadian Albums (Nielsen SoundScan)	31
Dutch Compilation Albums (Compilation Top 30)	1
German Compilation Albums (Offizielle Top 100)	13
Greek Albums (IFPI)	10
Hungarian Compilation Albums (MAHASZ)	3
Mexican Albums (Top 100 Mexico)	23
Swiss Compilation Albums (Schweizer Hitparade)	12
UK Compilation Albums (Official Charts)	12
UK Dance Albums (Official Charts)	5
US Billboard 200	170
US Top Dance Albums (Billboard)	2

=== Year-end charts ===
2007 year-end chart performance
Chart (2007)	Position
Belgian Compilation Albums (Ultratop Wallonia)	9

2008 year-end chart performance
Chart (2008)	Position
Belgian Compilation Albums (Ultratop Wallonia)	39

== Certifications ==
Certifications
Region	Certification	Certified units/sales
Canada (Music Canada)	Gold	50,000^{^}
Ireland (IRMA)	Gold	7,500^{^}
^{^} Shipments figures based on certification alone.

== Release history ==
Release history
Country	Release date
Netherlands	7 September 2007
United States	16 October 2007
