= The Loves We Lost =

- The Loves We Lost single cover

Single by Allure

from the album In Search of Sunrise 4: Latin America
- Released: 23 January 2006
- Recorded: 2005
- Genre: Electronic, progressive trance
- Length: 8:55
- Label: Magik Muzik
- Songwriter(s): Tiësto
- Producer(s): Tiësto

Allure singles chronology
"No More Tears" (2000)	"The Loves We Lost" (2006)	"Somewhere Inside" (2008)

"The Loves We Lost" first appeared in Tiësto's In Search of Sunrise 4: Latin America compilation. The song features samples from Paula Cole's song "She Can't Feel Anything Anymore". The song is performed by Allure, which is an alias of Tijs Verwest.

== Formats and track listings ==
=== CD, maxi-single ===
United Kingdom Maxi Single

1. "The Loves We Lost" (Original Mix)–8:55
2. "The Loves We Lost" (Tilt Remix)–9:13
3. "The Loves We Lost" (Original CD Version)–6:02

=== 12" vinyl ===
Magik Muzik, Ultra Records, Maelstrom Records 12" Vinyl

1. "The Loves We Lost" –8:55
2. "The Loves We Lost" (Tilt Remix)–9:13

== Personnel ==
- Vocals: Paula Cole
- Writers: Tiësto & Paula Cole
- Samples from Paula Cole's song "She Can't Feel Anything Anymore".
- "The Loves We Lost (Tilt Remix)"
  - Remixer(s): Andy Moor & Mick Park

== Charts ==
Chart (2006)	Peak position
UK Singles (OCC)	89
US Billboard Hot Dance Singles Sales	17

== Official versions ==
- Original Mix (8:55)
- Tilt Remix (9:13)
- Original CD Version (6:02)

== Release history ==
Region	Date	Label	Format	Catalog
United Kingdom	30 January 2006	Maelstrom Records	CD, maxi	MAELCD042
United Kingdom	30 January 2006	Maelstrom Records	vinyl, 12"	MAELT042
United States	23 January 2006	Ultra Records	vinyl, 12"	UL 1353-6
Netherlands	23 January 2006	Magik Muzik	vinyl, 12"	Magik Muzik 828-5
