= In Search of Sunrise 4: Latin America =

Compilation album by Tiësto
- Released: 13 April 2005 (Netherlands)
- Recorded: 2005
- Genres: Trance, progressive trance
- Length: 2:34:53 (Total); 77:51 (Disc 1); 77:02 (Disc 2)
- Label: Songbird

In Search of Sunrise chronology
In Search of Sunrise 3: Panama (2002)	In Search of Sunrise 4: Latin America (2005)	In Search of Sunrise 5: Los Angeles (2006)

Tiësto chronology
Parade of the Athletes (2004)	In Search of Sunrise 4: Latin America (2005)	Just Be: Remixed (2005)

Professional ratings
Review scores
Source	Rating
About.com	link

In Search of Sunrise 4: Latin America is the fourth compilation album in the In Search of Sunrise series mixed by Dutch trance producer and DJ Tiësto, released on 13 April 2005.

== Track listing ==
Disc 1
No.	Title	Artist(s)	Length
1.	"Like a Waterfall" (In Search of Sunrise Edit)	Solarstone and JES	7:15
2.	"Moments"	ToneDepth & SoulTan	5:31
3.	"Why" (In Search of Sunrise Edit)	Ahmet Ertenu	4:39
4.	"Do What U Want" (Max Graham Afterhours in Montreal Mix)	JASEfos feat. Claire van der Boom	4:25
5.	"Wurz + Blosse"	Wighnomy Brothers	3:11
6.	"La Noche"	Coca & Villa	6:21
7.	"Twelve" (Dousk Mix)	Tilt	5:22
8.	"My World" (Andy Moor Mix)	Luminary	6:49
9.	"Blend Forty 3" (Luke Chable & Steve May Remix)	Steve May	4:22
10.	"Arcadia" (In Search of Sunrise Edit)	Gabriel & Dresden	4:08
11.	"Midnight Express"	Split Second	7:02
12.	"The Force of Gravity" (Tiësto Remix)	BT	6:47
13.	"The Loves We Lost"	Allure	5:27
14.	"Perfect Silence" (E-Craig's 212 Remix)	Blank & Jones	6:27
Total length:			77:51

Disc 2
No.	Title	Artist(s)	Length
1.	"Palma Solane"	Estuera vs. Re:Locate	5:16
2.	"Beyond"	Leon Bolier presents Inner Stories	4:36
3.	"Gravity"	P.O.S.	4:16
4.	"People I Used to Know'"	LNQ	6:29
5.	"Slow It Down" (Mathilda Mix)	Mads Arp featuring Julie Harrington	5:08
6.	"Sounds Rushing (David West Remix)" (In Search of Sunrise Edit)	Dominic Plaza	5:15
7.	"Bad"	Matthew Dekay vs. Proluctors	6:12
8.	"White Noise"	Electric Pulse	6:20
9.	"Gravity"	Erik Shepard featuring Grayarea	6:13
10.	"UR" (Junkie XL Air Guitar Remix)	Tiësto featuring Matt Hales from Aqualung	7:31
11.	"Evolution"	Odyssee	4:32
12.	"Sands of Time"	Progression	5:06
13.	"Netherworld" (Oliver Prime Remix)	L.S.G.	5:57
14.	"Only One" (Rave Mix)	Sensorica vs. Jin Key	4:03
Total length:			77:02

== Charts ==
=== Weekly charts ===
Weekly chart performance
Chart (2005)	Peak position
Australian Dance Albums (ARIA)	14
Belgian Compilation Albums (Ultratop Flanders)	3
Belgian Compilation Albums (Ultratop Wallonia)	5
Dutch Compilation Albums (Compilation Top 30)	1
Hungarian Albums (MAHASZ)	11
UK Compilation Albums (Official Charts)	29
UK Dance Albums (Official Charts)	4
US Heatseekers Albums (Billboard)	19
US Independent Albums (Billboard)	27
US Top Dance Albums (Billboard)	3

=== Year-end charts ===
Year-end chart performance
Chart (2005)	Position
Belgian Compilation Albums (Ultratop Flanders)	19
Belgian Compilation Albums (Ultratop Wallonia)	34
US Top Dance/Electronic Albums (Billboard)	21
