= In Search of Sunrise: Summer Tour 2008 =

2008 concert tour by Tiësto

In Search of Sunrise: Summer Tour
- Tour by Tiësto
- Tiësto in a flyer, promoting his next tour.
- Start date: May 23, 2008
- End date: December 31, 2008
- Legs: 2
- No. of shows: 121

Tiësto concert chronology
- Elements of Life World Tour (2007-2008); In Search of Sunrise: Summer Tour (2008); Kaleidoscope World Tour (2009-2010)

Armani Exchange Presents Tiësto In Search of Sunrise Summer Tour 08 is a partnership tour between Tiësto and Armani Exchange.

The purpose of this junction between both is to promote themselves, Armani will offer exclusive apparel to Tiësto and a special limited edition release containing 3 CDs of his In Search of Sunrise 7: Asia compilation which is due June 10. The tour took place in North America on May 23 and ended on July 4. Cary Brothers, José González and Tegan & Sara performed live along Tiësto at the Bonnaroo Music and Arts Festival in Manchester, Tennessee and Topher Jones who recently joined Black Hole Recordings was invited to open some sets for Tiësto. On June 22 at the Constitution Plaza in Connecticut; former member of Gabriel & Dresden, Dave Dresden, Second Sun, Randy Boyer, and Kered & Kiraly played along Tiësto.

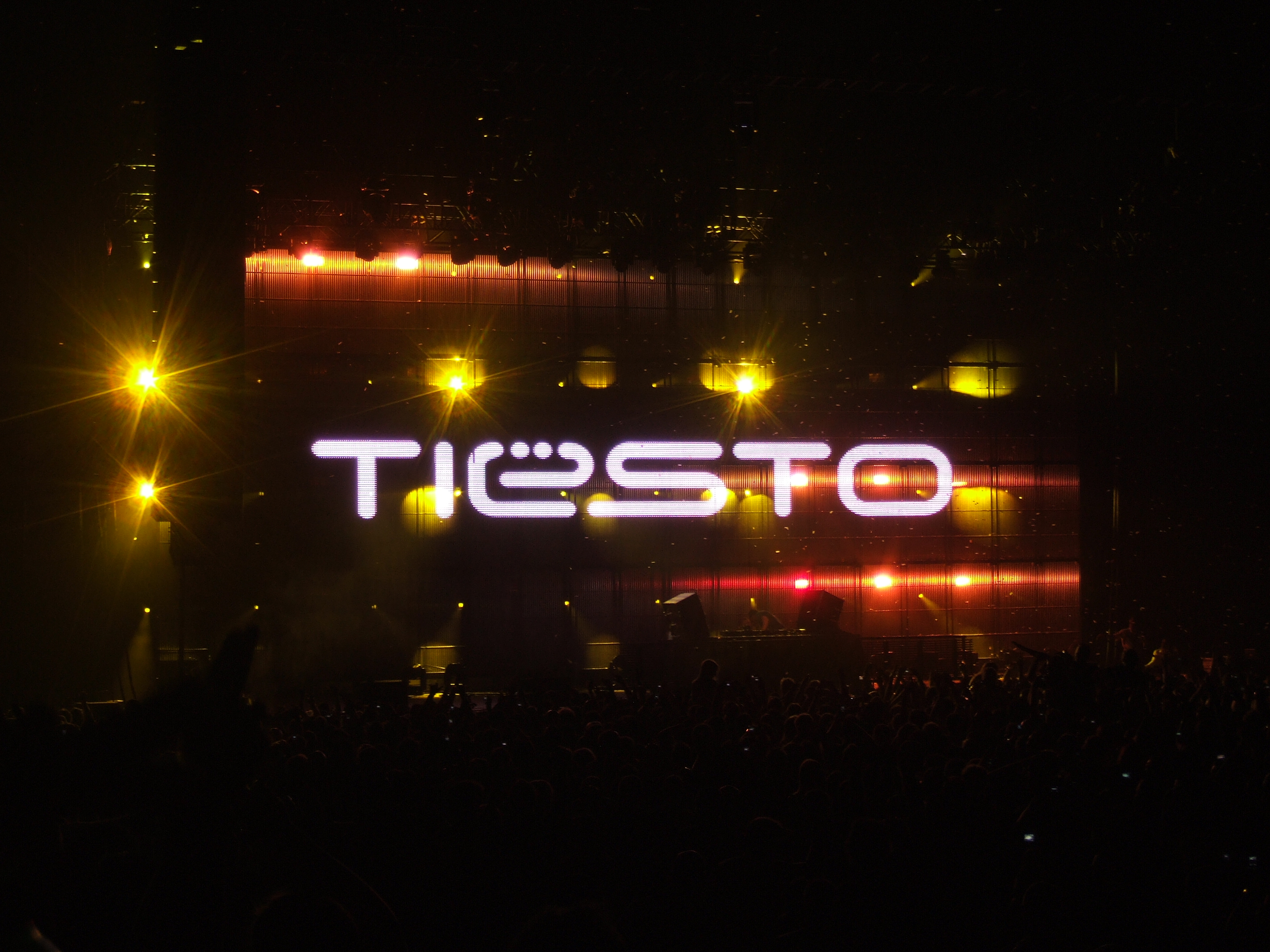
Tiësto at the O_{2} Arena in London on August 8, 2008

== Tour dates ==
Date	City	Country	Venue
North America
May 23, 2008	San Francisco	United States	Ruby Skye
May 24, 2008	San Francisco	United States	ETD Pop Festival, Cow Palace
May 25, 2008	Las Vegas	United States	Jet
May 26, 2008	Las Vegas	United States	Bank
May 31, 2008	Seattle	United States	Washington Mutual Theater
June 2, 2008	Phoenix	United States	Marquee Theater
June 4, 2008	Los Angeles	United States	Vanguard
June 5, 2008	Los Angeles	United States	Vanguard
June 6, 2008	Los Angeles	United States	Vanguard
June 7, 2008	San Diego	United States	Wave House
June 7, 2008	San Diego	United States	4th and B
June 8, 2008	El Paso	United States	BLU
June 9, 2008	Houston	United States	Bar Rio
June 10, 2008	Dallas	United States	Le Cirque
June 11, 2008	Kansas City	United States	Uptown Theater
June 12, 2008	Minneapolis	United States	Epic
June 13, 2008	Manchester	United States	Bonnaroo Music and Arts Festival
June 14, 2008	Chicago	United States	Vision
June 15, 2008	Chicago	United States	House of Blues
June 16, 2008	Detroit	United States	Clutch Cargoes
June 17, 2008	Cleveland	United States	Metropolis
June 18, 2008	Boston	United States	The Estate
June 19, 2008	Boston	United States	The Estate
June 20, 2008	Atlantic City	United States	The Mixx
June 21, 2008	The Hamptons	United States	White House
June 22, 2008	Hartford	United States	Constitution Plaza "Outdoors"
June 23, 2008	Atlanta	United States	Opera
June 24, 2008	Charlotte	United States	The Forum
June 25, 2008	New York City	United States	Webster Hall
June 26, 2008	New York City	United States	Webster Hall
June 27, 2008	New York City	United States	Webster Hall
June 28, 2008	Washington, D.C.	United States	Ibiza
June 29, 2008	Washington, D.C.	United States	Ibiza
June 30, 2008	Toronto	Canada	Ricoh Coliseum
July 2, 2008	Halifax	Canada	Cunard Centre
July 3, 2008	The Hamptons	United States	Whitehouse
Europe
July 5, 2008	Paris	France	Unighted By Cathy Guetta, Stade de France
July 6, 2008	Madrid	Spain	Rock In Rio
July 7, 2008	Ibiza	Spain	Privilege
July 9, 2008	Mallorca	Spain	BCM Dance Planet
July 10, 2008	Lisbon	Portugal	Super Bock Super Rock
July 11, 2008	Barcelona	Spain	She Discoteca
July 12, 2008	Spaarnwoude	Netherlands	Dance Valley
July 13, 2008	Marbella	Spain	Dreamers
July 14, 2008	Ibiza	Spain	Privilege
July 16, 2008	Zrće	Croatia	Papaya Summer Festival
July 17, 2008	Bodrum	Turkey	Catamaran
July 18, 2008	Istanbul	Turkey	World Trade Center
July 19, 2008	Vienna	Austria	Gasometer
Africa
July 20, 2008	Alexandria	Egypt	Ghazala Bay Resort
Europe
July 21, 2008	Ibiza	Spain	Privilege
July 23, 2008	Lloret del Mar	Spain	Colossos
July 24, 2008	Porto	Portugal	Praia de Matosinhos
July 25, 2008	Stratford	England	GodsKitchen Global Gathering
July 26, 2008	Kołobrzeg	Poland	Sunrise Festival
July 27, 2008	Rimini	Italy	Altromondo Studios
July 28, 2008	Ibiza	Spain	Privilege
July 29, 2008	Tel Aviv	Israel	Haoman 17
July 30, 2008	Kyrenia	Northern Cyprus	Vogue Beach Club
July 31, 2008	Beirut	Lebanon	Forum de Beyrouth
August 1, 2008	Kastellaun	Germany	Nature One Festival
August 2, 2008	Westmeath	Ireland	Ballinlough Castle
August 3, 2008	Jesolo	Italy	Spiaggia del Faro
August 4, 2008	Ibiza	Spain	Privilege
Africa
August 6, 2008	Hammamet	Tunisia	Golf Yasmine
Europe
August 7, 2008	La Pineda	Spain	Pacha
August 8, 2008	London	England	The O_{2} Arena
August 9, 2008	Edinburgh	Scotland	Royal Highland Centre
August 10, 2008	Albufeira	Portugal	Praia dos Pescadores
August 11, 2008	Ibiza	Spain	Privilege
August 17, 2008	Lloret del Mar	Spain	Colossos
August 18, 2008	Ibiza	Spain	Privilege
August 20, 2008	Braga	Portugal	Lagars
August 21, 2008	Vila Real	Portugal	Andromeda
August 22, 2008	Machovo Lake	Czech Republic	Machac Festival
August 23, 2008	Harlemmermeer	Netherlands	Mysteryland
August 24, 2008	Liverpool	England	Creamfields
August 25, 2008	Ibiza	Spain	Privilege
North America
August 26, 2008	Vancouver	Canada	Plush
August 27, 2008	Vancouver	Canada	Celebrities Nightclub
August 28, 2008	Calgary	Canada	Flames Central
August 29, 2008	Atlantic City	United States	Event Center, The Borgata
August 30, 2008	Quebec City	Canada	Centre des Foires
Europe
September 1, 2008	Ibiza	Spain	Privilege
September 3, 2008	Marbella	Spain	Dreamers
September 4, 2008	Geneva	Switzerland	Platinum
September 5, 2008	Antrim	Northern Ireland	Planetlove, Shane's Castle
September 6, 2008	Poznań	Poland	Stadium of Sound
September 7, 2008	Helsinki	Finland	Colors Festival, Kaapelitehdas
September 8, 2008	Ibiza	Spain	Privilege
September 10, 2008	Mallorca	Spain	BCM Dance Planet
September 11, 2008	Barcelona	Spain	Opium Mar
September 13, 2008	Debrecen	Hungary	Főnix Hall
September 14, 2008	Bratislava	Slovakia	Dopler Club
September 15, 2008	Ibiza	Spain	Privilege
September 17, 2008	Sofia	Bulgaria	Festivalna Hall
September 18, 2008	Monte Carlo	Monaco	Karement
September 19, 2008	Antwerp	Belgium	Sportpaleis
September 20, 2008	St. Julian's	Malta	Eden Arena
September 21, 2008	Nicosia	Cyprus	Eleftheria Stadium
September 22, 2008	Ibiza	Spain	Privilege
November 29, 2008	Amsterdam	Netherlands	Dance4Life Fundraiser, The Sand
December 5, 2008	Oslo	Norway	Sentrum Scene
December 6, 2008	Bergen	Norway	Arenum
Latin America
December 10, 2008	Puebla	Mexico	Estadio de Beisbol Aquiles Serdan
December 11, 2008	Mexico City	Mexico	Roots
December 12, 2008	Monterrey	Mexico	Arena Monterrey
December 13, 2008	Guadalajara	Mexico	Foro Alterno
December 14, 2008	Mexicali	Mexico	Fex Centro de Espectaculo
North America
December 15, 2008	Anaheim	United States	Heat Ultra Lounge
December 16, 2008	Anaheim	United States	Heat Ultra Lounge
December 17, 2008	Portland	United States	Crystal Ballroom
December 18, 2008	San Francisco	United States	Ruby Skye
December 19, 2008	Reno	United States	Peppermill Resort & Casino
December 20, 2008	Denver	United States	Beta
December 25, 2008	Las Vegas	United States	Jet
December 26, 2008	Las Vegas	United States	Jet
December 27, 2008	Miami	United States	LIV
December 28, 2008	Orlando	United States	Hard Rock Cafe
December 29, 2008	Tampa	United States	Green Iguana
December 31, 2008	New York City	United States	Roseland Ballroom

== See also ==
- Armani Exchange
- In Search of Sunrise (series)
- In Search of Sunrise 7: Asia
