= In Search of Sunrise 8: South Africa =

Compilation album by Richard Durand
- Released: 10 May 2010 (Digital download); 17 May 2010 (CD)
- Genres: Trance, progressive trance, progressive house
- Label: SongBird

In Search of Sunrise chronology
In Search of Sunrise 7: Asia (2008)	In Search of Sunrise 8: South Africa (2010)	In Search of Sunrise 9: India (2011)

Richard Durand chronology
Always the Sun (2009)	In Search of Sunrise 8: South Africa (2010)	Wide Awake (2011)

In Search of Sunrise 8: South Africa is a compilation album by Dutch trance producer Richard Durand. It was released on 10 May 2010 by SongBird. It is the eight installment in the In Search of Sunrise compilation series, and the first not to be mixed by Tiësto, the founder of the series in 1999. On 6 May 2010 Richard Durand released a 12-minute teaser preview of the compilation on SoundCloud.

== Track listing ==
Disc one
No.	Title	Artist(s)	Length
1.	"My Sanctuary"	First State	7:38
2.	"Beautiful"	George Acosta feat. Fisher	6:15
3.	"The Violet Hour"	Venaccio & Daigon	7:07
4.	"Envy"	Kostya Veter feat. Madelin Zero	7:32
5.	"As the Rain Falls"	Ad Brown and Matt Lange feat. Kerry Leva	7:45
6.	"Never Alone"	Craving	8:27
7.	"There Is Hope"	Zoo Brazil feat. Rasmus Kellerman	6:15
8.	"Pillars of the Earth"	Ben Preston	6:18
9.	"Kiss of Life" (Ibiza Sunrise Mix)	San vs. Wendel Kos	7:22
10.	"Sydney"	Jorg Zimmer	8:43
11.	"Introspection Attempts" (Moonbeam Remix)	Avis Vox	6:12
12.	"The Darkest Star"	Tom Cloud	7:27
13.	"For No Reason"	Richard Durand	7:16

Disc two
No.	Title	Artist(s)	Length
1.	"Deltree"	Michael Badal, Zya & Teddy C	7:51
2.	"Something For the Pain"	Ad Brown feat. Renee Six	7:30
3.	"September Rain"	Jason van Wyk	6:57
4.	"Kissed By the Sun" (S1dechain Remix)	San featuring Therese	7:48
5.	"Ocean Terrace"	Daniel Wanrooy	7:28
6.	"The Emergency"	BT	9:58
7.	"Jellyfish"	Alex O'Rion	8:14
8.	"N.Y.C."	Richard Durand & JES	7:31
9.	"Distant Motion" (Aurosonic Remix)	Hodel & Sunstate	8:08
10.	"Par"	Beltek	7:43
11.	"Satellite of Love" (Fabio XB Rework Dub)	Bartlett Bros. vs. Mazza	7:55
12.	"We.are"	Who.is	3:59
13.	"With Me" (Original Vocal Mix)	DJ Observer & Daniel Heatcliff feat. Hannah Ray	8:25

Beatport bonus tracks
No.	Title	Artist(s)	Length
1.	"Satellite of Love" (Ronski Speed Remix)	Bartlett Bros. vs. Mazza	8:23
2.	"Beautiful" (Robbie Rivera Juicy Miami Mix)	George Acosta feat. Fisher	7:05

iTunes bonus tracks
No.	Title	Artist(s)	Length
1.	"Satellite of Love" (Claudia Cazacu Remix)	Bartlett Bros. vs. Mazza	7:25
2.	"Beautiful" (Gerry Cueto Mix)	George Acosta feat. Fisher	6:28
