= In Search of Sunrise 5: Los Angeles =

Compilation album by Tiësto
- Released: 25 April 2006
- Recorded: 2006
- Genres: Trance, progressive trance
- Length: 2:35:29 (Total); 77:41 (Disc 1); 77:48 (Disc 2)
- Label: SongBird

In Search of Sunrise chronology
In Search of Sunrise 4: Latin America (2005)	In Search of Sunrise 5: Los Angeles (2006)	In Search of Sunrise 6: Ibiza (2007)

Tiësto chronology
Just Be: Remixed (2005)	In Search of Sunrise 5: Los Angeles (2006)	Elements of Life (2007)

About.com
Review scores
Source	Rating
Disc 1	link
Disc 2	link

In Search of Sunrise 5: Los Angeles is the fifth compilation album in the In Search of Sunrise series mixed by Dutch trance producer and DJ Tiësto, released on 25 April 2006 in the Netherlands. It was mixed while Tiësto was on holiday with his friend BT in Los Angeles in February 2006. The packaging contains a special slipcase that is printed with metallic foil. It was certificated Gold in Canada for sales over 50,000 copies. It also charted, peaking 34 in Canada and 59 in Austria.

In Search of Sunrise 5: Los Angeles consists of songs that are mainly from the progressive trance or progressive house genre of electronic dance music.

== Track listing ==
Disc 1
No.	Title	Artist(s)	Length
1.	"Malibu Beach"	Conil	2:24
2.	"Colour My Eyes"	Mark Norman presents Celine	6:24
3.	"Empty Streets" (Haji & Emanuel Remix)	Late Night Alumni	5:39
4.	"Beside Me" (Gothek D.C. Remix)	Electro-Prompt	5:15
5.	"Moonlight Party"	Fonzerelli	3:26
6.	"Everything Matters" (Matthew Dekay Remix)	Leama & Moor	6:53
7.	"Let The Game Begin"	Matthew Dekay vs. Proluctors	5:24
8.	"Your Loving Arms" (Club Mix)	Karen Overton	6:54
9.	"Let Me Be" (Original Extended)	Parker & Hanson	3:26
10.	"Novocaine" (Mark Otten Remix)	Kalafut & Fygle	3:41
11.	"People Will Go" (Steve Forte Rio Remix)	JES	4:55
12.	"Small Step on the Other Side"	Basic Perspective	6:14
13.	"Told You So"	Tom Cloud	5:10
14.	"Arise" (Exclusive Hammer & Funabashi Remix)	A.M. feat. Tiff Lacey	6:16
15.	"Little Bird"	Cass Fox	5:31
Total length:			77:41

- Late Night Alumni - "Empty Streets (Haji & Emanuel Remix)" there was no credit given to Haji & Emanuel for the remix in the booklet or back cover
- A.M. - "Arise (Exclusive Hammer & Funabashi Remix)" is an exclusive version to ISOS and the vinyl sampler, it is not the same remix that is on the regular 12" release
- Cass Fox - "Little Bird" was later released as Deep Skies' "Little Bird (Mike Koglin Remix)"
- Conil - "Malibu Beach" is a song by Tiësto under the name of Conil, made only for this compilation.

Disc 2
No.	Title	Artist(s)	Length
1.	"LAX"	Pink Elephant	1:51
2.	"Something is Wrong"	Alex Stealthy	5:49
3.	"Zanzibar"	Shah & Laruso present Global Experience	6:03
4.	"Technophobia"	Progression	5:34
5.	"Green Astronauts"	A Boy Called Joni	6:18
6.	"These Days" (Luke Chable's Those Days Remix)	Petter	5:49
7.	"Tales From The South" (Jonas Steur's Revision Flow)	Estuera	8:43
8.	"Irony"	Özgür Can	6:03
9.	"Second Turn"	Jonas Steur	6:47
10.	"Hi Jack" (Instrumental)	Smith & Pledger present Aspekt	4:50
11.	"Genesis" (Jimbo's Afterburner Mix)	Jaytech	7:45
12.	"Helsinki Scorchin"	Super8 & DJ Tab	6:38
13.	"Don't Forget Me" (Guy Ehmetores Remix)	Way Out West	5:31
Total length:			77:48

- Smith & Pledger present Aspekt - "Hi Jack (Instrumental)" it is not a credited instrumental version, but does credit Carrie Skipper as a vocalist as there is a vocal version of the song

== Personnel ==
- Compiling, mixing – Tiësto
- Mastering – Barney Broomer

== Charts ==
=== Weekly charts ===
Weekly chart performance
Chart (2006)	Peak position
Australian Dance Albums (ARIA)	16
Austrian Albums (Ö3 Austria)	59
Belgian Compilation Albums (Ultratop Flanders)	4
Belgian Compilation Albums (Ultratop Wallonia)	1
Canadian Albums (Nielsen SoundScan)	34
Dutch Compilation Albums (Compilation Top 30)	1
German Compilation Albums (Offizielle Top 100)	9
Hungarian Compilation Albums (MAHASZ)	2
Swiss Compilation Albums (Schweizer Hitparade)	4
UK Compilation Albums (Official Charts)	12
UK Dance Albums (Official Charts)	3
US Billboard 200	164
US Heatseekers Albums (Billboard)	5
US Independent Albums (Billboard)	17
US Top Dance Albums (Billboard)	6

=== Year-end charts ===
Year-end chart performance
Chart (2006)	Position
Belgian Compilation Albums (Ultratop Flanders)	21
Belgian Compilation Albums (Ultratop Wallonia)	4
US Top Dance/Electronic Albums (Billboard)	14

== Certifications ==
Certifications
Region	Certification	Certified units/sales
Canada (Music Canada)	Gold	50,000^{^}
Netherlands (NVPI)	Gold	35,000^{^}
^{^} Shipments figures based on certification alone.
