= Somewhere Inside (Allure song) =

- Somewhere Inside single cover

Single by Allure featuring Julie Thompson

from the album In Search of Sunrise 6: Ibiza
- Released: February 2008
- Recorded: 2007
- Genre: Trance, progressive trance
- Label: Magik Muzik
- Songwriter(s): Tiësto
- Producer(s): Tiësto

Allure singles chronology
"The Loves We Lost" (2005)	"Somewhere Inside" (2008)	"Power of You" (2008)

"Somewhere Inside" first appeared in Tiësto's In Search of Sunrise 6: Ibiza compilation, and was titled "Somewhere Inside of Me", but according to its appearance with singer-songwriter Julie Thompson in the Elements of Life World Tour (DVD), the song is titled "Somewhere Inside". Upon release, it charted number 9 in the Netherlands.

== Formats and track listings ==
12" Vinyl

Magik Muzik, Maelstrom Records 12" Vinyl

1. "Somewhere Inside" (Original Mix)–9:52
2. "Somewhere Inside" (Andy Duguid Remix)–8:03

== Personnel ==
- Artwork and Design: Hugo de Graaf
- Composer(s): D.J. Waakop Reijers-Fraaij, Julie Thompson & Tiësto
- Presenter: Tiësto
- Writer(s): Julie Thompson & Tiësto

== Charts ==
Chart (2008)	Peak position
Netherlands Dance	6

== Official versions ==
- Original Mix (9:52)
- Andy Duguid Remix (8:03)

== Release history ==
Region	Date	Label	Format	Catalog
United Kingdom	February 2008	Maelstrom Records	CD, Promo	MAELT081
United Kingdom	February 2008	Maelstrom Records	vinyl, 12"	MAELT081
Netherlands	February 2008	Magik Muzik	vinyl, 12"	Magik Muzik 849-5
