= Glenn Morrison (DJ) =

Canadian DJ and record producer

- Born: September 12, 1985 (age 40)
- Origin: Toronto, Ontario, Canada
- Genres: Electronic dance music, house, progressive house
- Occupations: DJ, Record Producer, Remixer, Mastering Engineer, Composer
- Instruments: Synthesizer, Piano, Keyboard, Digital audio workstation
- Years active: 2005–present
- Labels: Fall From Grace, Dying Light, Ambient Wave, Wolfe, Ministry of Sound, Play Records, Hope, Time
- Website: glennmorrison.com

Glenn Morrison is a Canadian DJ , record producer, musician and composer from Toronto, Ontario. He is best known for his tracks, "Contact", "No Sudden Moves", "Hydrology", "Circles" and “Goodbye”.

== Life and career ==
Morrison is a classically trained pianist. Starting piano lessons at the age of four, he began composing and competing through CMC, Kiwanis Music Festival, Richmond Hill Music Festival, and ORMTA - Ontario Registered Music Teachers Association.

In his early high school years, Morrison discovered techno from a friend in his science class, and started collecting vinyl and becoming absorbed. He then worked at Release Records for five years before starting his own record label Morrison Recordings.

As a DJ and performer he entertains with melodic progressive house and big-room club sounds. His first international hit was in 2007 when DJ Tiësto featured ‘Contact’ on his compilation In Search of Sunrise 6: Ibiza and it shot to the top of the World Dance Charts.

=== Alpine Mastering ===
Through Alpine Mastering, Morrison has worked on sound design for video game companies like Nintendo and Activision. A partnership for electronic music was focused on sound-scoring live theatre visuals. Morrison and IMAX unveiled this concept with a 3 part show series at the 2012 ComicCon .

=== Morrison Recordings ===
Morrison also ran Morrison Recordings which designed, developed, manufactured, marketed, supported a wide range of mediums, from music to print services.

== Awards and nominations ==
=== Juno Awards ===
Year	Nominee / work	Award	Result
2015	Glenn Morrison	Breakthrough Artist of the Year	Nominated
2015	"Goodbye" (Glenn Morrison)	Dance Recording of the Year	Nominated

=== Sirius XM Radio Music Awards ===
Year	Nominee / work	Award	Result
2015	Glenn Morrison	Dance Artist of the Year	Nominated

=== SOCAN Radio Music Awards ===
Year	Nominee / work	Award	Result
2015	Glenn Morrison	Artist of the Year	Nominated
2015	"Goodbye" (Glenn Morrison)	Song of the Year	Nominated
2015	Glenn Morrison	Dance Artist of the Year	Nominated

== Discography ==
=== Albums ===
- Into the Deep (2016)

=== Extended plays ===
- Odyssey (2009)
- Drone (2009)

=== Singles ===
Year	Single	Peak positions		Certifications	Album
Year	Single	CAN		Certifications	Album
2007	"No Sudden Moves (w/ deadmau5)"	—	—		Non-album singles
2007	"Contact" (w/ deadmau5)	—	—		Non-album singles
2013	"Goodbye" (featuring Islove)	12		MC: 2× Platinum	Non-album singles
2014	"Colourblind (featuring Andrew Cole)	88			Non-album singles
