= In Search of Sunrise 7: Asia =

Compilation album by Tiësto
- Released: 10 June 2008
- Recorded: 2008
- Venues: X2 Resorts (Kui Buri, Thailand)
- Genres: Trance, progressive trance, progressive house
- Length: 2:20:05
- Label: Black Hole

In Search of Sunrise chronology
In Search of Sunrise 6: Ibiza (2007)	In Search of Sunrise 7: Asia (2008)	In Search of Sunrise 8: South Africa (2010)

Tiësto chronology
Elements of Life: Remixed (2008)	In Search of Sunrise 7: Asia (2008)	Kaleidoscope (2009)

In Search of Sunrise 7: Asia is a compilation album by Dutch trance producer and DJ Tiësto and his seventh and final contribution to the In Search of Sunrise compilation series. It was released on 10 June 2008 and was followed by a North American Tour during all of June. In 2008, Tiësto announced his In Search of Sunrise: North American Summer Tour 2008, the tour was presented by Armani Exchange on 23 May and ended on 4 July at the Bonnaroo Music and Arts Festival on Friday 13 June. This tour was in support of the In Search of Sunrise compilation, which was part of a sponsorship partnership, with exclusive apparel and a limited edition 3-CD set. An exclusive best of CD from the DJ’s own imprint Black Hole Recordings, called "10 Years of Black Hole Recordings" was released that year. Armani also sold an exclusive Tiësto branded tour T-shirt, and Tiësto performed at three A|X in-stores during the tour.

To support the release of his new mix compilation, Tiësto kicked off a dedicated North American 2008 In Search of Sunrise Summer Tour, with 36 club shows across the States and Canada on 13 June. He also hosted an exclusive two-month-long residency at Club Privilege in Ibiza. Tiësto was the resident every Monday, starting on 7 July until the closing party on 22 September. Tiësto delivered four hour deejay sets in the style of his In Search Of Sunrise series, everything supported by a newly developed and custom made state of the art production. A video was released in YouTube which explains the production and making of the compilation and introduces four tracks: "Cary Brothers - Ride (Tiësto Remix)", "Airbase feat. Floria Ambra - Denial", "Banyan Tree — Feel The Sun Rise", and "Andy Duguid featuring Leah — Wasted".

The 3xCD Limited Edition of Armani Exchange's In Search of Sunrise 7: Asia compilation was released on 14 June.

== Track listing ==
In Search of Sunrise 7: Asia Disc 1
No.	Title	Artist	Length
1.	"Feel The Sun Rise"	Banyan Tree	2:09
2.	"Wasted"	Andy Duguid featuring Leah	4:18
3.	"Yohkoh (King Unique Original Mix)"	King Unique	4:24
4.	"Space Katzle (Jerome Sydenham Remix)"	Motorcitysoul	4:55
5.	"Feel The Rhythm (Ton TB Dub Mix)"	Three Drives	5:53
6.	"To Forever (Moonbeam Remix)"	Rachael Starr	5:08
7.	"The Storm (Inpetto Remix)"	Jerry Ropero featuring Cozi	5:36
8.	"Get Lifted"	Kamui	5:21
9.	"Ride (Tiësto Remix)"	Cary Brothers	5:06
10.	"Denial"	Airbase featuring Floria Ambra	6:03
11.	"Reason To Believe"	Dokmai	6:03
12.	"6 a.m. (Kyau & Albert Remix)"	Cressida	5:05
13.	"Power of You"	Allure featuring Christian Burns	6:39
14.	"Hua-Hin"	Clouded Leopard	2:01

In Search of Sunrise 7: Asia Disc 2
No.	Title	Artist	Length
1.	"Blossom (Lounge Mix)"	Steve Forte Rio featuring JES	2:00
2.	"Crossroads"	Zoo Brazil	4:47
3.	"Kenta"	Beltek	5:59
4.	"Rush"	Sied van Riel	5:00
5.	"Driving To Heaven (Mat Zo Remix)"	Tiësto	5:49
6.	"Just A Thought"	Carl B.	6:05
7.	"Melkweg"	Kimito Lopez	6:09
8.	"Whenever I May Find Her (Joni Remix)"	JPL	5:34
9.	"Casa Grande"	Estiva vs. Marnix	5:12
10.	"Wounded Soul"	Existone	6:31
11.	"Something For Your Mind (Giuseppe Ottaviani Remix)"	André Visior & Kay Stone	6:01
12.	"The Curtain"	Hensha	6:57
13.	"Tanz Der Seele (YOMC Remix)"	DJ Eremit	3:49
14.	"Beyond The Stars"	Manilla Rising	1:31

In Search of Sunrise 7: Asia Disc 3 (Armani Exchange Limited Edition CD Only)
No.	Title	Artist	Length
1.	"Back In Your Head (Tiësto Remix)"	Tegan & Sara	8:10
2.	"The Right Life (Tiësto Remix)"	Seal	7:24
3.	"Crosses (Tiësto Remix)"	José González	6:21
4.	"Piece of Me (Tiësto Remix)"	Britney Spears	7:55
5.	"Tell Me (Max Graham Remix)"	Clear View Featuring Jessica	8:49
6.	"Falling (First State's Stuck Parachute Mix)"	First State Featuring Anita Kelsey	7:22
7.	"Elements Of Life (Live From Copenhagen) (QuickTime Music Video)"	Tiësto	3:33
8.	"Ride (Tiësto Remix) (QuickTime Music Video)"	Cary Brothers	3:42

In Search of Sunrise 7 Asia 2 x LP

A1. Andy Duguid feat. Leah - Wasted
A2. Kamni - Get Lifted

B1. Cary Brothers - Ride ( Tiesto Remix)
B2. Airbase feat. Floria Ambra - Denial

C1. Dokmai - Reason to believe
C2. Zoo Brazil — Crossroads

D1. Beltek - Kenta
D2. Sied van Riel — Rush

== Charts ==
=== Weekly charts ===
Weekly chart performance
Chart (2008)	Peak position
Australian Dance Albums (ARIA)	9
Austrian Albums (Ö3 Austria)	31
Belgian Compilation Albums (Ultratop Flanders)	6
Belgian Compilation Albums (Ultratop Wallonia)	2
Canadian Albums (Billboard)	11
Dutch Compilation Albums (Compilation Top 30)	1
German Compilation Albums (Offizielle Top 100)	14
Hungarian Compilation Albums (MAHASZ)	1
Mexican Albums (Top 100 Mexico)	25
Swiss Compilation Albums (Schweizer Hitparade)	8
UK Compilation Albums (Official Charts)	14
UK Dance Albums (Official Charts)	5
US Billboard 200	91
US Independent Albums (Billboard)	8
US Top Dance Albums (Billboard)	2

=== Year-end charts ===
Year-end chart performance
Chart (2008)	Position
Belgian Compilation Albums (Ultratop Wallonia)	21
US Top Dance/Electronic Albums (Billboard)	19

== Certifications ==
Certifications
Region	Certification	Certified units/sales
Canada (Music Canada)	Gold	40,000^{^}
Russia (NFPF)	Gold	10,000^{*}
^{*} Sales figures based on certification alone.^{^} Shipments figures based on certification alone.
