= Lange (musician) =

British DJ and record producer

- Born: Stuart James Langelaan; 4 June 1974 (age 52)
- Origin: Shrewsbury, United Kingdom
- Genres: Trance
- Instrument: DJ
- Years active: 1998 – present
- Label: Lange Recordings
- Website: lange-music.com

Stuart Langelaan (born 4 June 1974), stage name Lange, is a British DJ and record producer.

== Career ==
Lange was born in Shrewsbury. His career began in 1997, signing his first recording contract with Additive Records in the UK. Early popularity was achieved with a collection of releases attracting the attention of industry leaders such as Paul van Dyk, Sasha, Paul Oakenfold, and Judge Jules.

Lange had several hits in the UK Singles Chart. His remix work includes DJ Sakin's "Protect Your Mind", which was followed by his Lost Witness "Happiness Happening" remix. Other remix credits include work for Faithless and the Pet Shop Boys (the Lange remix of "New York City Boy" featured on their Pop Art album's bonus "remix disc").

In 1999, he released the vinyl-only single "I Believe" featuring vocals by Sarah Dwyer, charting at No. 68. A year later, in 2000, he released the single "Follow Me" on Positiva, featuring the vocals of Cecily Fay from The Morrighan. Upon its release, the track was deemed chart ineligible as the CD single contained six tracks (including the previous release "I Believe") and over 40 minutes of music (at the time, chart rules stated that CD singles could only contain three tracks with a total running length of 20 minutes). The single reached No. 1 on the UK budget album chart upon release, staying in the chart for four weeks. "I Believe" and "Follow Me" were re-released as part of Positiva Records 10th birthday celebrations in 2003, reaching No. 12 in the UK budget album chart.

"Drifting Away" reached No. 9 in the UK Singles Chart in 2002, and resulted in Lange performing on the BBC One's Top of the Pops and also the Pepsi Chart Show. Lange was also behind the SuReaL track "You Take My Breath Away", which peaked at No. 15 in the UK in 2000.

Lange mixes have accumulated many appearances on compilation albums, including two tracks on the million-selling EMI Now That's What I Call Music! series. Other projects include his 'Firewall', 'LNG', and 'Vercetti' guises. In 2003, Firewall's "Sincere" was released on Armin Van Buuren's A State of Trance record label, and was re-released on Lange's own label, Lange Recordings. His 2003 track, "Don't Think It (Feel It)" (featuring Leah) peaked at No. 59 in the UK Singles Chart. In 2005, Lange went down the commercial road again with the release of the vocal track "If I ever see you again", under the name of Offbeat, however this only made number 136 in the UK Charts, probably due to it being a 12" release only despite the apparent mainstream appeal of the track.

As a club DJ, Lange reached No. 37 in the DJ Mag poll. As well as playing some of the UK's biggest clubs (including Godskitchen, Gatecrasher, Passion, Gallery, and Slinky), Lange regularly tours internationally. Touring has taken him to Australia, Denmark, Finland, Germany, Hungary, Japan, the Netherlands, New Zealand, Russia, China, Singapore, Sweden, Switzerland, Ibiza, Canada and the United States. Lange has headlined music festivals including Australia's Summadayze (alongside Tiësto), the Popsicle festival in San Francisco, Spooky and WEMF in Canada, and Fortdance in St Petersburg, performing alongside Ferry Corsten and Tiësto.

He released his debut album Better Late Than Never on Maelstrom and Lange Recordings in 2007. The album had one CD of new material, and a second disc called History that highlighted some of his past hits from 1998 to the present. Three singles from the album had successful releases; those were "Songless", "Angel Falls" and the most successful release, "Lange feat. Sarah Howells – Out of the Sky". That release retained a top 10 position on the Beatport Trance Chart for a considerable time after the track's release in October 2008, and earned Lange the nomination as one of the Beatport Top 10 selling Trance Artists in 2008.

In 2010, he released his second album, Harmonic Motion. In 2013, his third album, "We Are Lucky People", was released.

== Discography ==
=== Studio albums ===
- 2007 Better Late Than Never
- 2010 Harmonic Motion
- 2013 We Are Lucky People

=== Compilation albums ===
- 1999 Tranceformer 2000 (Mixed By Mauro Picotto & Lange)
- 2003 A Trip In Trance 3 (Mixed By Lange)
- 2005 Global Phases Vol 1 (Mixed By Lange)
- 2009 Visions – Lange Recordings Sessions (Mixed By Lange)
- 2009 Lange pres. Intercity – Summer 2009 (Mixed By Lange)
- 2010 Lange pres. Intercity – Spring 2010 (Mixed by Lange)
- 2011 Passion – The Album (Mixed by Lange & Genix)
- 2011 Lange Remixed (Mixed by Lange)
- 2012 Lange pres. Intercity 100 – The Album (Mixed by Lange)
- 2013 Ministry of Sound – Trance Nation (Mixed By Lange)
- 2014 In Search Of Sunrise 12 (Mixed By Richard Durand & Lange)

=== Singles ===
- 1998 "The Root of Unhappiness / Obsession"
- 1999 "I Believe" (feat. Sarah Dwyer)
- 2000 "Follow Me" (feat. The Morrighan)
- 2000 "You Take My Breath Away" (as SuReal)
- 2001 "Reflections / Touched" (as Firewall)
- 2001 "Always On My Mind" (as SuReal)
- 2001 "The Way I Like It" (as S.L.)
- 2001 "Memory" (with DuMonde)
- 2002 "Drifting Away" (feat. Skye)
- 2002 "Atacama / Summer in Space" (with Pulser as The Bass Tarts)
- 2003 "Sincere" (as Firewall)
- 2002 "Frozen Beach"
- 2003 "Don't Think It (Feel It)" (feat. Leah)
- 2003 "I'm in Love Again" (as X-odus feat. Xan)
- 2003 "I Believe 2003 / Follow Me" (feat. The Morrighan)
- 2003 "Intercity" (as LNG)
- 2004 "Kilimanjaro" (as Firewall)
- 2004 "Sincere For You" (feat. Kirsty Hawkshaw)
- 2004 "In Control / Skimmer" (as Vercetti)
- 2005 "If I Ever See You Again" (as Offbeat)
- 2005 "Sincere 2005" (as Firewall)
- 2005 "This Is New York / X Equals 69" (with Gareth Emery)
- 2006 "Bermuda / Radar" (with Mike Koglin)
- 2006 "Looking Too Deep" (as Firewall feat. Jav D)
- 2006 "Back on Track / Three" (with Gareth Emery)
- 2006 "Dial Me Up"
- 2006 "Another You, Another Me" (with Gareth Emery)
- 2007 "Red October"
- 2007 "Angel Falls"
- 2008 "Songless"
- 2008 "Out of the Sky" (feat. Sarah Howells)
- 2009 "Stadium Four" (with Andy Moor)
- 2009 "Let It All Out" (feat. Sarah Howells)
- 2009 "Happiness Happening 2009" (feat. Tracey Carmen)
- 2009 "Wanderlust" (as Firewall)
- 2010 "Under Pressure"
- 2010 "Live Forever" (feat. Emma Hewitt)
- 2010 "Strong Believer" (feat. Alexander Klaus)
- 2010 "Harmonic Motion"
- 2010 "All Around Me" (feat. Betsie Larkin)
- 2011 "Electrify" (with Fabio XB and Yves Lacroix)
- 2011 "Brandalism" (as LNG)
- 2011 "Harmony Will Kick You in the Ass" (as LNG)
- 2011 "Hoover Damn" (as LNG)
- 2011 "Lange Remixed EP1: Touched (Dash Berlin's 'Sense of Touch' Remix) / Under Pressure (Steve Brian Remix) / Angel Falls (Signalrunners Fierce Remix)"
- 2011 "Songless (Mark Sherry's Outburst Remix)" (feat. Jennifer Karr)
- 2012 "Our Way Home" (feat. Audrey Gallagher)
- 2012 "Crossroads" (feat. Stine Grove)
- 2012 "We Are Lucky People"
- 2012 "Destination Anywhere"
- 2013 "Hold That Sucker Down"
- 2013 "Immersion" (with Genix)
- 2013 "Our Way Home (The Remixes)" (feat. Audrey Gallagher)
- 2013 "Our Brief Time in the Sun"
- 2013 "Risk Worth Taking" (feat. Susana)
- 2013 "Follow Me 2013" (feat. The Morrighan)
- 2013 "A Different Shade of Crazy"
- 2013 "Harmony Will Kick You in the Ass / Hoover Damn (Remixes)" (as LNG)
- 2013 "Imagineer"
- 2013 "Fireflies" (feat. Cate Kanell)
- 2014 "Crossroads (Remixed)" (feat. Stine Grove)
- 2014 "Insatiable" (feat. Betsie Larkin)
- 2014 "Unfamiliar Truth (Remixed)"(feat. Hysteria!)
- 2014 "Hey! While The Sun Shines" (as LNG)
- 2014 "Top Of The World" (with Andy Moor feat. Fenja)
- 2014 "Top Of The World (Remixes)" (with Andy Moor feat. Fenja)
- 2015 "Formula None"
- 2015 "Origin"
- 2015 "Formula None (Remixes)"
- 2015 "Wired To Be Inspired"
- 2015 "Weaponized" (with Stephen Kirkwood)
- 2015 "You Are Free"
- 2015 "On Your Side" (feat. Tom Tyler)
- 2016 "Airpocalypse"
- 2016 "Conspiracy"
- 2016 "Hacktivist"
- 2016 "On Your Side (Remixed)" (feat. Tom Tyler)
- 2016 "The First Rebirth"
- 2017 "Unity" (with Andy Moor as Stadium4)
- 2017 "The Great Silence" (as Lange presents Firewall)
- 2020 "Hybrid Origin" (with Andy Moor as Stadium4)

=== Remixes ===
- 2024 The Conductor & The Cowboy "Feeling This Way"
- 2013 Andy Moor "K Ta"
- 2013 Allure Feat. Emma Hewitt "No Goodbyes"
- 2013 Dennis Sheperd & Cold Blue "Fallen Angel"
- 2012 Dash Berlin Feat. Kate Walsh "When You Were Around"
- 2011 Super8 & Tab Feat. Betsie Larkin "Good Times"
- 2011 Gareth Emery "Into The Light"
- 2009 Ferry Corsten "We Belong"
- 2009 Above & Beyond presents OceanLab "I Am What I Am"
- 2009 Bartlett & Dyor "Floating Beyond"
- 2008 Kyau & Albert "Hide and Seek"
- 2008 Matt Cerf vs Evelio Feat Jaren "Walk Away"
- 2008 Martin Roth & Alex Bartlett "Off the World"
- 2007 DT8 "Perfect World"
- 2007 Jas Van Houten "Loco Love"
- 2005 Hemstock & Jennings "Mirage of Hope"
- 2004 The Thrillseekers "New Life"
- 2004 Empyreal Sun "From Dark To Light"
- 2003 Pulser "My Religion"
- 2003 Dario G "Feels Like Heaven"
- 2003 Ayumi Hamasaki "Hanabi"
- 2002 Ian Van Dahl "Reason"
- 2001 Ultra 5 feat. J Cee "Potion"
- 2001 SPX "Straight to the Point"
- 2001 Ian Van Dahl "Will I"
- 2001 Eye To Eye Feat. Taka Boom "Can't Get Enough"
- 2001 D. B. Boulevard "Point of View"
- 2001 Dumonde vs. Lange "Memory"
- 2000 Z2 "I Want You"
- 2000 Ruff Driverz Presents Arrola "Dreaming"
- 2000 DJ Sakin & Friends "Stay (Reminiscing)"
- 2000 Rhythm of Life "Put Me in Heaven"
- 2000 DuMonde "Tomorrow"
- 2000 Atlantis Vs Avatar "Fiji"
- 1999 TR Junior "Rock With Me"
- 1999 The Morrighan "Remember (To the Millenium)"
- 1999 The Space Brothers "Heaven Will Come"
- 1999 Smudge & Smith "Near Me"
- 1999 Pulp Victim "The World '99"
- 1999 Pet Shop Boys "New York City Boy"
- 1999 Lost Witness "Red Sun Rising"
- 1999 Lost Witness "Happiness Happening"
- 1999 Friends of Matthew "Out There"
- 1999 Faithless "Why Go?"
- 1999 DJ Sakin & Friends "Nomansland"
- 1999 DJ Manta "Holding On"
- 1999 Brainchild "Symmetry C"
- 1999 Agnelli & Nelson "Everyday"
- 1999 Agenda "Heaven"
- 1998 Sosa "The Wave"
- 1998 Sash! "Move Mania"
- 1998 Marc Et Claude "La"
- 1998 Golden Delicious "Ascension"
- 1998 DJ Sakin & Friends "Protect Your Mind"
- 1998 DJ Quicksilver "Timerider"
- 1998 Boccaccio Life "Secret Wish"
- 1998 Babe Instinct "Disco Babes From Outer Space"
