= Andy Duguid =

German-Scottish DJ and producer

- Also known as: Reeves, Corsie, Emilio Fernandez
- Born: Andy Duguid; 1982 (age 43–44); Gütersloh, Germany
- Genres: Progressive Trance
- Occupations: DJ, producer, remixer
- Years active: 2006–present
- Label: Black Hole Recordings

Andy Duguid (born 1982) is a German-Scottish DJ and producer. His most renowned singles, "Don't Belong" and "Wasted", were included on Tiesto's in Search of Sunrise-series in 2007 and 2008.

== Early life ==
Andy Duguid was born in Gütersloh, Germany in 1982. He moved to England before relocating to Scotland around 1990, where he has lived since. At age 10 he began experimenting with keyboards and pianos for several years before starting to produce music around age 14.

== Career ==
Duguid released his first single "Hypocrisy" on Black Hole Recordings in 2006, which garnered significant play support from both Paul van Dyk and Armin van Buuren. His next single, "Don't Belong" released in 2007, was featured on In Search of Sunrise 6: Ibiza and also was reported as "one of the biggest tracks of 2007". In October 2007 Duguid was asked by Black Hole to create an album so it would be released a year later.

After being asked to create an album, Duguid released his single "Wasted" in 2008 which was included on In Search of Sunrise 7: Asia. The song became an opening track with Banyan Tree's Feel The Sunrise. In October 2008, Duguid released his first studio album Believe which features long-time friend Iris Morrison (Leah) also known as Alanah, Mr. Sam and his friend Solarstone, Esmaye, who is also part of Black Hole's repertoire, Donna & Anthony, I-Fan, and Julie Thompson, whom he is currently helping to produce her first album to be released on Black Hole after her return to the dance scene with Tiësto's "Somewhere Inside" which had also appeared on in Search of Sunrise 6: Ibiza. It also included Duguid's remix once it was released as a single on Magik Muzik. After the release of Duguid's album and the time of his brother's death, he confirmed that he wrote White Sands together with his brother which is the last track on Duguid's album. Speaking to Vh1 India, Duguid said, "This track means so much. You can lose pictures or videos of your loved ones but this is something that will be around forever and it makes me very proud of my brother."

In December 2008, he joined Radio Volum as part of their program on Saturday nights from 10:00 to 12:00. During the first 45 minutes, Duguid opens his set followed 15 minutes of "Chance" in which Andy lets unsigned artists show some of their own tunes and their mixing abilities. From 11:00 to 11:30 he plays a selected number of classic anthems from the electronic dance music scene. The last 30 minutes of the program include his closing set which is similar to the opening. The radio show is now syndicated to a number of stations worldwide, including Dance Paradise Brazil, to a listenership of over two million people. In October 2013, Duguid told Vh1 India that After Dark Music was put on hold to be restructured and would resume operations by the Christmas season.

=== Dedication to Olivia Downie ===
The track "7even" featuring vocals from Jaren Cerf was released on 14 October 2013, and is the fifth single off of Duguid's second album On the Edge. On his Facebook page, Duguid explained that the song and music video are based on the story of Olivia Downie, a young girl who died after a long battle with neuroblastoma, an aggressive form of cancer. Her story made national headlines while her parents raised funds for her treatment. When the song became available for download on digital music stores, Andy announced that he would donate all of his royalties from the track to cancer research in Olivia's name.

== Discography ==
=== Albums ===
- 2008: Believe
- 2013: On The Edge

=== Singles ===
- 2007: "Hypocrisy" / "Dreamcatcher" (Black Hole)
- 2007: "Don't Belong" (featuring Leah) (Black Hole)
- 2008: "Wasted" (featuring Leah) (Black Hole)
- 2008: "To the Floor" (featuring I-Fan) (Black Hole)
- 2009: "Signals" / "Neremiah" (Black Hole)
- 2009: "Falling" (featuring Julie Thompson) (Black Hole)
- 2009: "Call of Loneliness" (as Reeves featuring Alanah) (Anjunabeats)
- 2009: "My Number" (featuring Donna & Anthony) (Premier)
- 2009: "DejaVoodoo" (Black Hole)
- 2010: "Light" (as Reeves and Marcus Schössow featuring Emma Hewitt) (Tone Diary)
- 2010: "Miracle Moments" (featuring Leah) (Black Hole)
- 2010: "Dreams" (as Reeves featuring Alanah) (Anjunabeats)
- 2011: "Strings" (featuring Fenja) (Magik Muzik)
- 2011: "Symphony" (After Dark Music)
- 2012: "I Want to Believe" (featuring Shannon Hurley) (Magik Muzik)
- 2012: "Music Box" (featuring Lizzie Curious) (Magik Muzik)
- 2012: "Before You Go" (with Jes) (Magik Muzik)
- 2013: "Skin & Bones" (with Julie Thompson) (Magik Muzik)
- 2013: "In This Moment" (with Audrey Gallagher) (Magik Muzik)
- 2013: "7even" (featuring Jaren) (Magik Muzik)
- 2013: "On the Edge" (Magik Muzik)
- 2014: "Hurt" (featuring Seri) (Magik Muzik)
- 2014: "History" (featuring Jaren) (Magik Muzik)
- 2017: "Follow You" (featuring Natalie Major) (Magik Muzik)
- 2017: "C.H.I.C." (Magik Muzik)
- 2021: "Dreamers" (with Chelsea Holland) (Magik Muzik)
- 2021: "Analigital" (Magik Muzik)

Productions

- 2008 Let It Go (Emilio Fernandez)
- 2008 Reynosa (Emilio Fernandez)
- 2008 Whiplash (Russell G)
- 2008 Stranded (Russell G)
- 2008 Cygnes (Mr. Sam featuring clAud9)
- 2009 Saltillo (Emilio Fernandez)
- 2009 Feeling for Corners [album] (Julie Thompson)

=== Remixes ===
- 2007 Johan Gielen – Okinawa Sunset [Black Hole]
- 2007 Jay Lumen – Mana [Deep]
- 2007 Russell G – Dark Room [Songbird]
- 2008 Tiësto – Bright Morningstar [Black Hole]
- 2008 Allure – Somewhere Inside [Maelstrom]
- 2008 Phynn – Starfire at Night [Black Hole]
- 2008 Whelan and Di Scala – Close My Eyes [Bachelor Pad]
- 2008 Mr. Sam and Andy Duguid – Hold My Breath [Black Hole]
- 2008 Headstrong – Helpless (as Emilio Fernadez) [Sola Records]
- 2008 Tiësto pres. Alone in the Dark – Edward Carnby [Black Hole]
- 2008 Kimito Lopez – Arabian Queen [Songbird]
- 2009 Yamin featuring Marcie – No One [Motion Recs]
- 2009 Dash Berlin featuring Cerf, Jaren and Mitiska – Man on the Run [Armada]
- 2009 Cosmic Gate – Not Enough Time [Black Hole]
- 2009 OceanLab – On The Beach [Anjunabeats]
- 2009 Paul Thomas and Funkagenda – Gornal [GU Music]
- 2009 Alex M.O.R.P.H. – Purple Audio [Vandit]
- 2009 John O'Callaghan featuring Lo:Fi Sugar – Never Fade Away [Armada]
- 2009 Filo & Peri – Ashley [Vandit]
- 2009 Dunugoz vs. Tha Roofas – The One Armed Bandit [Outstanding]
- 2009 Adam Sheridan – TLK [Armada]
- 2009 Motion Child and Will Holland featuring Tiff Lacey – Arctic Kiss [Enhanced]
- 2009 Richard Durand – No Way Home [Black Hole]
- 2010 Mark Pledger featuring Melinda Gareh – Time Stands Still [Solaris Recordings]
- 2010 Tiësto featuring Nelly Furtado – Who Wants to be Alone [Music is Freedom]
- 2010 Fred Baker – Saona [Magik Muzik]
- 2010 Super8 and Tab – Mercy [Anjunabeats]
- 2010 Lost Stories pres. Prayag and Rishab – Ashna [Songbird]
- 2011 Allure featuring Christian Burns – On the Wire [Magik Muzik]
- 2011 Gareth Emery featuring Lucy Saunders – Fight the Sunrise [Garuda]
- 2011 Moonbeam featuring Avis Vox – Hate Is the Killer [Moonbeam Digital]
- 2011 Dennis Ruyer – A Night at the Opera (as Duguid) [Black Hole]
- 2011 The Scumfrog featuring Davey La – All Go Down [Avanti]
- 2012 Tosch – Trip in 2 the Night [Sounds United]
- 2012 Betsie Larkin and Sied van Riel – The Offering [Premier]
- 2012 Tomomi Ukumori – Hermitage
- 2013 Betsie Larkin and Bobina – No Substitute For You [Magik Muzik]
- 2013 Loverush UK! featuring Bryan Adams – [Magik Muzik]
- 2013 Manufactured Superstars featuring Danni Rouge – Like Satellites [Magik Muzik]
- 2013 Curtis Young – Tequila Sunrise [D.Max]
- 2014 J-Soul pres. Andy Jaar featuring Leusin – Morning Light [Black Hole]
