= Richard Durand =

Dutch Disc jockey and record producer

- Birth name: Richard van Schooneveld
- Also known as: Cliffhanger, Cyber Human, G-Spott, L.T.R. van Schooneveld, Out Now
- Born: 5 April 1976 (age 48); Amsterdam, Netherlands
- Genres: Trance
- Occupation(s): DJ, record producer
- Years active: 2000–present
- Labels: Black Hole, Magik Muzik, SongBird, Terminal 4
- Website: www.richarddurand.com

Richard van Schooneveld (Dutch pronunciation: [ˈritɕɑrt fɑn ˈsxoːnəvɛlt]; (Note: Van in isolation: [vɑn]) born 5 April 1976), better known as Richard Durand (Dutch pronunciation: [ˈritɕɑr dyˈrɑnt] (Note: Richard in isolation: [ˈritɕɑrt])), is a Dutch disc jockey and record producer.

== Biography ==
Starting his career in 2005, Durand was recommended by Tiësto as his 'Tip for the Top in 2007' in DJ Magazine. In that same year, he was placed in the DJ Magazine Top 100 DJs poll.

His first creations were tech trance singles "Make Me Scream" and "Slipping Away" on the Terminal 4 label, but his real success started with remixes of the Tiësto singles "Lethal Industry", "Flight 643" and "Break My Fall", and reworks of the Prodigy's "Smack My Bitch Up" and Snow Patrol's "Chasing Cars" which brought him into the playlist of DJs such as Armin van Buuren, Paul van Dyk, Ferry Corsten, Judge Jules and Eddie Halliwell.

In 2008, Durand remixed Fragma's "Toca's Miracle" and Armin van Buuren's "In and Out of Love". His solo productions included "Weep" featuring Skin from Skunk Anansie on vocals, which was signed to Perfecto Records.

In 2009, Durand remixed Art of Trance's "Madagascar" followed by his debut artist album Always the Sun on Magik Muzik/Black Hole Recordings. The album spawned three singles: "Into Something", "Always the Sun" and "No Way Home".

== Discography ==
=== Albums ===
- Always the Sun (2009)
- Wide Awake (2011)
- Richard Durand Versus the World (2012)
- The Air We Breathe (2018)
- Reactivate (2022)

=== DJ mixes ===
- Portrait (2013)

In Search of Sunrise series

- In Search of Sunrise 8: South Africa (2010)
- In Search of Sunrise 9: India (2011)
- In Search of Sunrise 10: Australia (2012)
- In Search of Sunrise 11: Las Vegas (2013)
- In Search of Sunrise 12: Dubai (2014)
- In Search of Sunrise 13.5: Amsterdam (2015)

=== Singles ===
Year	Single	Peak positions	Album
Year	Single	NED	Album
2005	"Make Me Scream"	—	Non-album singles
2006	"Slipping Away"	62	Non-album singles
2006	"Sunhump 2006"	—	Non-album singles
2007	"Any Time"	—	Non-album singles
2007	"For the Believers 2.0"	—	Non-album singles
2007	"Inside My Brain"	70	Non-album singles
2007	"Submerge"	—	Non-album singles
2007	"Sweep and Repeat"	58	Non-album singles
2008	"Ledged Up"	—	Non-album singles
2008	"Predator vs. Cha Cha"	—	Non-album singles
2008	"Weep"	26	Non-album singles
2009	"Always the Sun"	—	Always the Sun
2009	"No Way Home"	—	Always the Sun
2009	"Into Something"	—	Always the Sun
2009	"Silver Key"	—	Always the Sun
2009	"Tiger's Apology"	—	Wide Awake
2010	"N.Y.C." (with JES)	—	Wide Awake
2010	"Dryland" (with Phynn)	—	Wide Awake
2010	"Night and Day" (with Christian Burns)	—	Wide Awake
2010	"Xelerate"	—	Wide Awake
2011	"Explode" (featuring Kash)	—	Wide Awake
2011	"Run to You" (featuring Hadley)	—	Non-album single
2012	"Trancefusion"	—	Richard Durand Versus the World
2014	"Shield of Faith" (featuring Cynthia Hall)	—	Non-album singles
2014	"In Your Hands" (featuring Fisher)	—	Non-album singles
2018	"The Air I Breathe"	—	The Air We Breathe
2019	"Vortex" (featuring Marco V)	—	Non-album singles
2020	"Malam" (with Dennis Shepherd and Roger Shah)	—	Non-album singles
2021	"My Guiding Light" (with Christina Novelli)	—	Non-album singles
2021	"I Matter to You" (with Susanna)	—	Non-album singles
2022	"Almost Home" (with Christian Burns)	—	Non-album singles
"—" denotes releases that did not chart

=== Remixes ===
- Armin van Buuren - "Wild Wild Son" (Richard Durand remix) (ft. Sam Martin)
- Art of Trance - "Madagascar" (Richard Durand remix)
- Ruben de Ronde & Roxanne Emery - "Gold" (Richard Durand remix)
- Tiësto - "Traffic" (Richard Durand remix)
- Tiësto - "Lethal Industry" (Richard Durand remix)
- Armin van Buuren - "In and Out of Love" (Richard Durand remix) (ft. Sharon den Adel)
- Tiësto - "Flight 643" (Richard Durand remix)
