= List of club DJs =

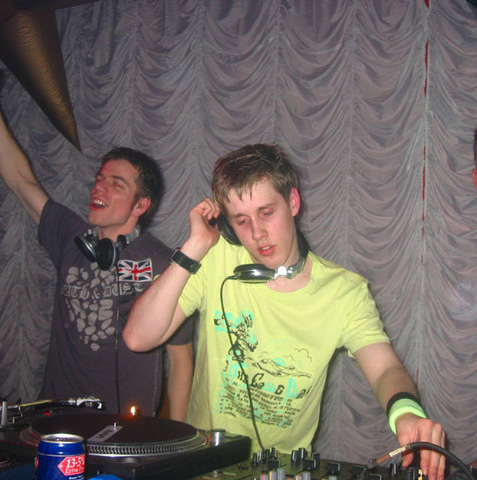
DJ Dougal and Gammer

This is a list of notable club DJs, professionals who perform at nightclub venues or other dance events, or who have been pioneers in the development of the role of the club DJ. DJs play a mix of recorded music for an audience at a bar, nightclub, dance club, or rave who dance to the music. The music is played through a sound reinforcement system.

DJs who use their real names are listed alphabetically by last name; DJs who use stage names are listed alphabetically by their first name.

== # ==
- 3 Are Legend
- 3lau (real name Justin Blau), American progressive house and electro house DJ and producer.

== A ==
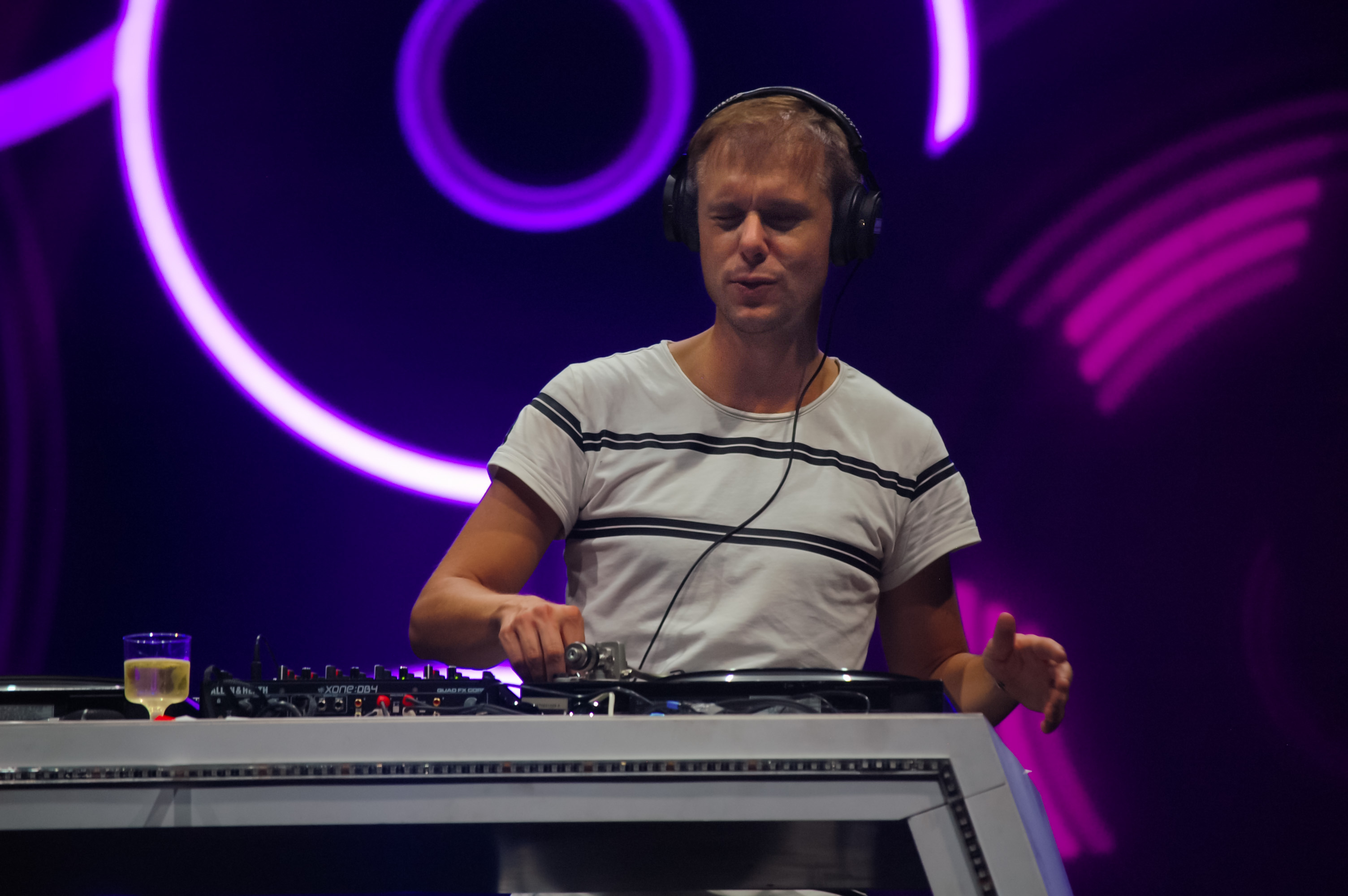
Armin van Buuren

- A-Trak
- Above & Beyond, English trance trio composed by Jonathan "Jono" Grant, Tony McGuinness and Paavo Siljamäki
- Adam Beyer, famous Swedish techno DJ and producer and boss of the influential Drumcode Records label
- Acid Maria (real name Angelika Lepper), one of the first house DJs at Munich club Ultraschall; prominent female techno DJ.
- Adventure Club
- Aero Chord
- Afrojack (real name Nick van de Wall), Dutch House DJ/Producer
- Alan Walker (real name Alan Olav Walker), Norwegian DJ & record Producer born in Northampton, United Kingdom
- Albatraoz
- Alesso
- Alexander Perls
- Alice Deejay
- Alison Wonderland
- All Hail the Silence
- Stu Allan
- Alle Benassi
- Alok
- Alvaro
- Amber D
- Amelie Lens Belgian DJ
- André Marques, Brazilian DJ, TV presenter and actor
- Angger Dimas, Indonesian electronic musician, DJ/producer, called the #1 DJ of Indonesia by thedjlist.com
- Aphex Twin
- Armin van Buuren (born 1976), Dutch trance DJ/producer. The only DJ who has been named number one DJ in the world 5 times on DJ Magazine's Top 100 DJ poll
- Armand van Helden, prominent funk & house DJ-producer prominent during the late-90s; best known for his track "You Don't Know Me"
- AronChupa
- Arty (musician) (real name Artem Stoliarov, born 1989), Russian DJ/producer
- ATB (real name André Tanneberger, born 1973), German Trance & Light Trance DJ/producer
- Audien (real name Nate Rathbun, born 1992), American Trance & House DJ/producer known for Pompeii remix
- Avicii (real name Tim Bergling, 1989–2018), Swedish house DJ/producer best known for the track "Levels"
- Axwell (real name Axel Hedfors, born 1977), Swedish house DJ/producer best known as a member of the Swedish House Mafia
- Axwell & Ingrosso
- Andrew Rayel (born 1992), Moldovan Trance DJ/Producer
- Ansolo, American DJ/producer and actor who portrayed Augustus Waters in The Fault In Our Stars

== B ==
- Brooks (DJ) (real name Thijs Westbroek), Dutch DJ, record producer & electronic musician from Eindhoven
- Bass Bumpers (also known as CJ Stone, and Bad Habit Boys), German Trance and techno DJ group
- Bass Hunter
- Bassjackers
- Bassnectar
- Basto
- Ben Klock, German techno DJ and resident at Berlin's Berghain nightclub
- Ben Böhmer
- Ben Nicky
- Benassi Bros.
- Benny Benassi
- Randy Bettis
- Michael Bibi, British DJ and founder of Solid Grooves
- Bicep
- Billy Daniel Bunter
- Billy Gillies
- Bingo Players
- Bizarrap, Argentine DJ and Record Producer of EDM, Reggaeton, and Trap also known as BZRP
- Björk
- Black Coffee
- Steve Blake
- Blasterjaxx, (Thom Jongkind and Idir Makhlaf), Dutch Electro House and Big Room House
- The Bloody Beetroots
- Bob Sinclar (born Christophe Le Friant; 10 May 1969), French record producer, house music DJ, remixer, he is a two time DJ Awards winner and also the owner of the label Yellow Productions.
- Boombox Cartel
- Boom Jinx (real name Øistein Johan Eide), composer, producer and DJ from Norway
- Borgeous
- Borgore
- Boris Brejcha
- Mark Brain
- Brandon Block
- Bro Safari

== C ==
- CamelPhat, British DJ and production duo, consisting of Dave Whelan and Mike Di Scala
- Calvin Harris (real name Adam Wiles, born 1984), Scottish DJ/producer
- Carnage (real name Diamanté Anthony Blackmon, born January 3, 1991), Guatemalan-American DJ and record producer
- Caspa (real name Gary McCann, born May 30, 1982), dubstep music producer from West London
- The Chainsmokers
- Charlotte de Witte
- The Chemical Brothers, duo DJs from UK
- Chris Liebing, German DJ known for playing a decisive role in shaping the hardcore techno genre Schranz
- Chris Lake
- Chuckie (real name Clyde Sergio Narain), Dutch House DJ/producer
- Claptone
- Cosmic Gate, German Progressive Trance, electronic DJ/producer
- Cash Cash
- John Course
- Carl Cox (born 1962), genres include house, tech house, techno, minimal techno winner of DJ Magazine's Worlds No. 1 DJ Award in 1996 and 1997 he is also an 11 time DJ Awards winner
- Cesqeaux (real name Daniel Francesco Tuparia), Dutch DJ/producer
- The Crystal Method, duo DJs from America, known for their "Vegas" CD
- Cristoph, UK prog and melodic master
- Chris Leão (Real name Christian Leão), electronic music producer and Brazilian DJ

== D ==
- DJ Bonez
- DVBBS
- DJ D-Sol (D-Sol)
- DallasK
- Danny Dyer alias Pwoper Nawty (born 1977), DJ and MC
- Danny Rampling, widely credited as one of the original founders of the UK's rave/club scene. He was the first No 1 DJ in the world voted by the staff of DJ Magazine in 1991 in 1997 the top 100 poll became a public vote.
- Danny Tenaglia "Daniel" (born March 7, 1961), New York-based DJ and Grammy nominated record producer he is also a 3 time IDMA winner and 3 time DJ Awards winner
- Darren Styles (real name Darren James Mew)
- Darude (real name Ville Virtanen, born 1975), originally from Finland
- Datsik
- David Grutman

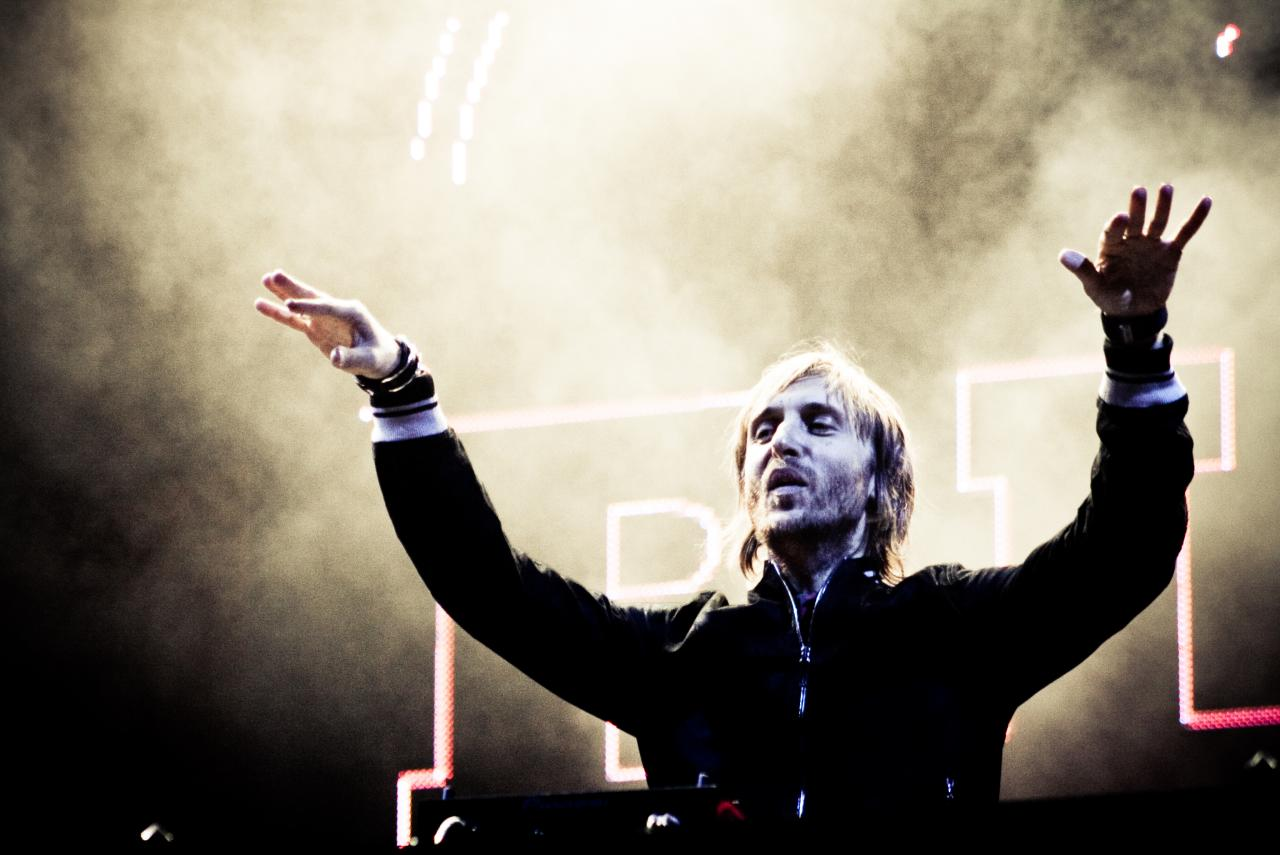
French DJ David Guetta (born 1967)

- David Guetta, French DJ
- David Mancuso, (born October 20, 1944), DJ/promoter created the popular "by invitation only" parties in New York City known as "The Loft Parties" many famous private discothèques/clubs of the '70s and '80s were modeled after The Loft, including the Paradise Garage, The Gallery, and The Saint.
- David Morales (born 21 August 1961), internationally acclaimed Grammy-winning American house music DJ and producer
- David Vendetta
- Deadmau5 (real name Joel Thomas Zimmerman, born 1981), Canadian House DJ/producer
- Dillon Francis
- Diplo, American DJ, record producer, rapper, singer, songwriter and record executive (Also works in collaboration with Skrillex as Jack Ü)
- Dirty South
- Sam Divine, British House DJ
- Deorro
- Derrick Carter
- Derrick May
- Detroit Grand Pubahs
- DJ Boston
- DJ Casper (real name Willie Perry Jr., 31 May 1965 — 7 August 2023), American songwriter and DJ
- DJ Hell, internationally acclaimed German DJ and boss of International Deejay Gigolos. His DJ performance has been portrayed in the film 196 BPM.
- DJ Icey
- DJ Koze, German techno DJ and producer
- DJ Kura (real name Ruben de Almeida, born 1987), Portuguese DJ and music producer
- DJ Lottie
- DJ Seduction
- DJ Snake
- John Digweed DJ, who travels all over the world and is producer, record label owner and artist
- Doctor P (real name Shaun Brockhurst, born 9 April 1986), British Dubstep DJ
- Don Diablo (real name Don Pepijn Schipper, born 27 February 1980), Dutch electronic Dance DJ
- Donald Glover (also known as: Childish Gambino), Donald McKinley Glover Jr is an American actor, comedian, singer, writer, producer, director, rapper, songwriter, and DJ. He performs music under the stage name Childish Gambino and as a DJ under the name mcDJ.
- DJ Dougal (real name Paul Arnold Clarke; born 1975), British hardcore and happy hardcore artist and DJ
- Dimitri Vegas & Like Mike
- Daft Punk, French electronic music duo
- Duke Dumont (Adam George Dyment, better known by his stage name Duke Dumont, is a British DJ and music producer born August 27, 1982)
- Duck Sauce, Nu Disco producer
- D-Wayne
- Dynoro
- Dyro

== E ==
- Ed Real
- Eiffel 65
- Electrosexual
- Darren Emerson
- Emmanuel Top (born 1971), French House / Acid DJ and producer
- Eric Prydz
- Erick Morillo (1971–2020), American DJ, music producer and record label owner, a six-time DJ Awards winner; he also helped in the production of the famous dance hit "Move It" by Reel 2 Real.
- Eptic
- Excision (dubstep producer)

== F ==
- Andy Farley
- Fatboy Slim (real name Norman Cook, born 1963), British DJ
- Fedde Le Grand, Dutch DJ
- Fergie (real name Robert Ferguson, born 1979), Northern Irish DJ
- Ferry Corsten, Dutch DJ
- Fish56Octagon, British DJ
- Flight Facilities, Australian DJ duo
- Flume, Australian DJ, known for his Grammy winning album Skin
- Flux Pavilion
- Frankie Bones (real name Frank Mitchell, born 1966), first American DJ who played the early U.K. scene in the late 80s
- Frankie Knuckles (real name Francis Nicholls, 1955–2014), helped to develop and popularize the electronic, disco-influenced dance music style called house music
- Freemasons (real name Russell Small and James Wiltshire)
- Frankie Cutlass (real name Frank Malave, born 1971), American DJ

== G ==
- Gabriel & Dresden (duo of Josh Gabriel and Dave Dresden, born 2001), their blend of house and progressive trance led to multiple Billboard number 1 hits
- Galantis
- getter
- Billy Gillies, trance DJ from Northern Ireland
- Paul Glazby
- The Glitch Mob
- Glowinthedark
- Goldie (a.k.a. Clifford Joseph Price) (born 1965), U.K. DJ
- Green Velvet
- GTA
- Laurent Garnier (born 1966), French DJ and original Quadrant Park resident DJ
- Guyver (DJ)

== H ==
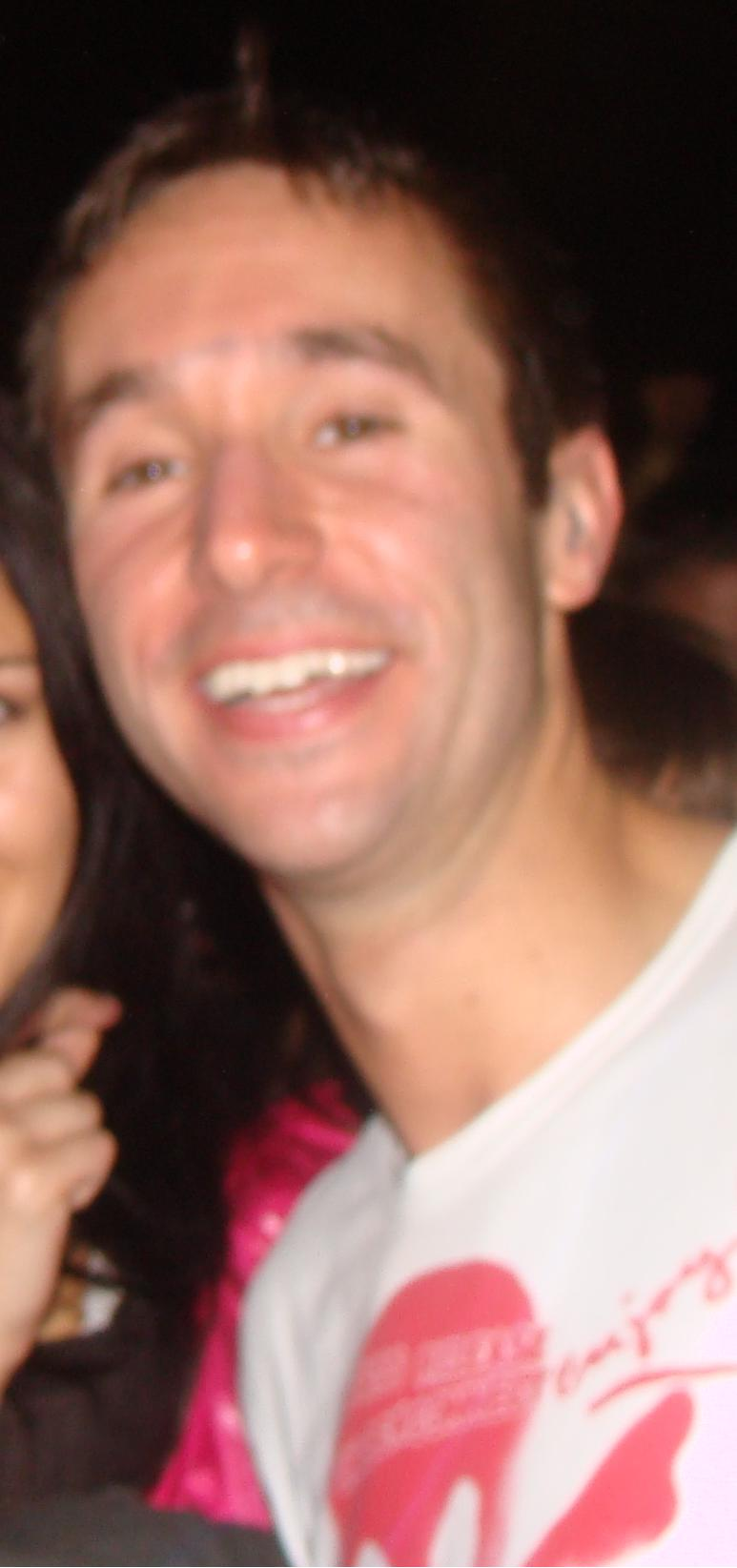
Eddie Halliwell at Creamfields in 2008

- Eddie Halliwell
- Hardwell (real name Robbert van de Corput), Dutch progressive house and electro house DJ and music producer
- Matt Hardwick, former resident DJ at Gatecrasher
- Dave Harris
- Lee Haslam hard dance DJ, producer, and general manager of Tidy Trax
- Headhunterz (real name Willem Rebergen), DJ from the Netherlands
- Hixxy

== I ==
- Illenium
- Sebastian Ingrosso (born 1983), Swedish DJ/producer; former member of the Swedish House Mafia
- ItaloBrothers, a German DJ group consisting of 4 musicians

== J ==
- Jack Beats
- Jack Ü
- Jack Wins, DJ
- James Hype, British DJ
- Jax Jones, British DJ
- Jay Hardway
- Jazzy M, British DJ
- Jeff Mills (born 1963), techno DJ
- Jeffrey Jey
- Jellybean Benitez (born 1957), Disco and House Music DJ, remixer and music producer
- Jewelz & Sparks
- Jillionaire
- Joey Dale
- John Digweed (born 1967), British progressive house DJ
- John Summit, American tech house DJ and music producer
- Jon Doe
- Jon Pleased Wimmin
- Jonas Blue (born 1989), British DJ, songwriter, record producer and remixer
- Joris Voorn (born 1997), Dutch house DJ and producer, who plays a mixture of techno, progressive and deep house styles
- Judge Jules (real name Julius O'Riordan, born 1965), UK house/trance DJs, who has a radio show on BBC Radio 1
- Junior Vasquez (born 1980), NYC House DJ from the late 80s to early 2000s
- Julian Jordan
- DJ Jurgen
- Justice, French electronic music duo
- Justin Prime

Judge Jules

== K ==
- K90
- Kaskade (real name Ryan Raddon, born 1972), American DJ and formerly an A&R assistant with Om Records.
- Kato (real name Thomas Kato Vittrup), Danish DJ
- Kayzo
- Ken Ishii (ケン・イシイ), Japanese techno DJ and producer from Sapporo. He graduated from Hitotsubashi University. He has released work under his own name as well as under the pseudonyms: FLR, Flare, UTU, Yoga, and Rising Sun.
- Kenneth G
- DJ Khaled
- Kill the Noise
- Klayton
- Knife Party
- Krewella
- Kutski
- KSHMR American DJ
- Kygo (real name Kyrre Gørvell-Dahll (born 1991)), Norwegian DJ
- Kylian Mash (born 1983), French DJ and record producer, known for hits, such as Club Certified and No Tomorrow

== L ==
- Lab 4, British hard trance musician
- Hannah Laing, Scottish DJ and record producer
- Steve Lawler, British house music producer and DJ born in Birmingham, England he is a five time DJ Awards winner. He currently runs the record label VIVa MUSiC. He also founded the now defunct Harlem Records.
- Laidback Luke (real name Lucas Cornelis van Scheppingen, born 1976), Filipino-born Dutch DJ
- Larry Levan (1954–1992), early and prolific re-mixer and the DJ at the 1970s discothèque The Paradise Garage
- Holly Lester Northern Irish DJ and label founder
- Lenny Fontana, American house music DJ from New York City
- Ian Levine, pioneering producer, label owner and DJ of the Hi-NRG sound during 1980s UK
- Lil Jon, American rapper and DJ
- Lisa Lashes, British DJ born in Leicester, England
- Lisa Loud
- Lisa M, Puerto Rican rapper and DJ
- LMFAO
- Luna-C

== M ==
- Paul Maddox
- Madeon (real name Hugo Pierre Leclercq), French DJ, "Finale" was used as theme song for video game PlayStation All-Stars Battle Royale
- Major Lazer
- MAKJ
- Mako
- Malaa
- Marcel Dettmann, German techno DJ and resident at Berlin's Berghain nightclub.
- Marshmello (real name Christopher Comstock), American DJ/producer
- Martin Garrix (real name Martijn Gerard Garritsen), Dutch DJ/producer
- Matthew Koma
- Mathieu Koss
- MATTN
- Mauro Picotto (born December 25, 1966), Italian electronic music producer and DJ, and previously a member of the Italian Euro house group "R.A.F.".
- Mason (band), Dutch music producer duo
- MEDUZA, Italian house producers
- Meg Ward, British DJ and producer
- Mesto (real name Melle Stomp) Dutch DJ and Producer
- Mike Williams (DJ) (real name Mike Willemsen), Dutch DJ and record producer
- Miki Love
- Michael Gray
- Michael K (real name Michal Kopij) (born September 29, 1990), Polish Electro/House DJ
- Michael Woods
- Miss Kittin, famous French club DJ, producer, live performer and pioneer of the Electroclash genre
- Miss Monique (real name Alessia Akrusha), Ukrainian female techno, progressive house and trance DJ
- MistaJam (real name Pete Dalton), famous DJ who has a show on 1Xtra
- Giorgio Moroder (born 1940), influential Italian record producer, songwriter, performer and DJ who won several Academy Awards, Grammys and other awards, is frequently credited with pioneering synthesizer disco and electronic dance music
- Monika Kruse, internationally acclaimed German techno and house DJ since the 1990s and label boss of Terminal M
- MOTi
- Mr. Oizo (real name Quentin Dupieux), French DJ/Electro producer and film director
- Martin Solveig (French DJ)

== N ==
- Nicky Romero (real name Nick Rotteveel), Dutch DJ and house music composer/producer
- Nicky Siano, former resident DJ at Studio 54 New York and The Gallery Chicago
- Nina Kraviz, Russian DJ and disk Jockey
- NERVO, Australian DJ and songwriters
- Nora En Pure (real name Daniela Niederer), South African-Swiss DJ and deep house producer
- Nesty La Mente Maestra Puerto Rican Reggaeton producer and DJ

== O ==
- Offer Nissim
- Oliver Heldens (HI-LO)
- Ookay
- Orjan Nilsen

== P ==
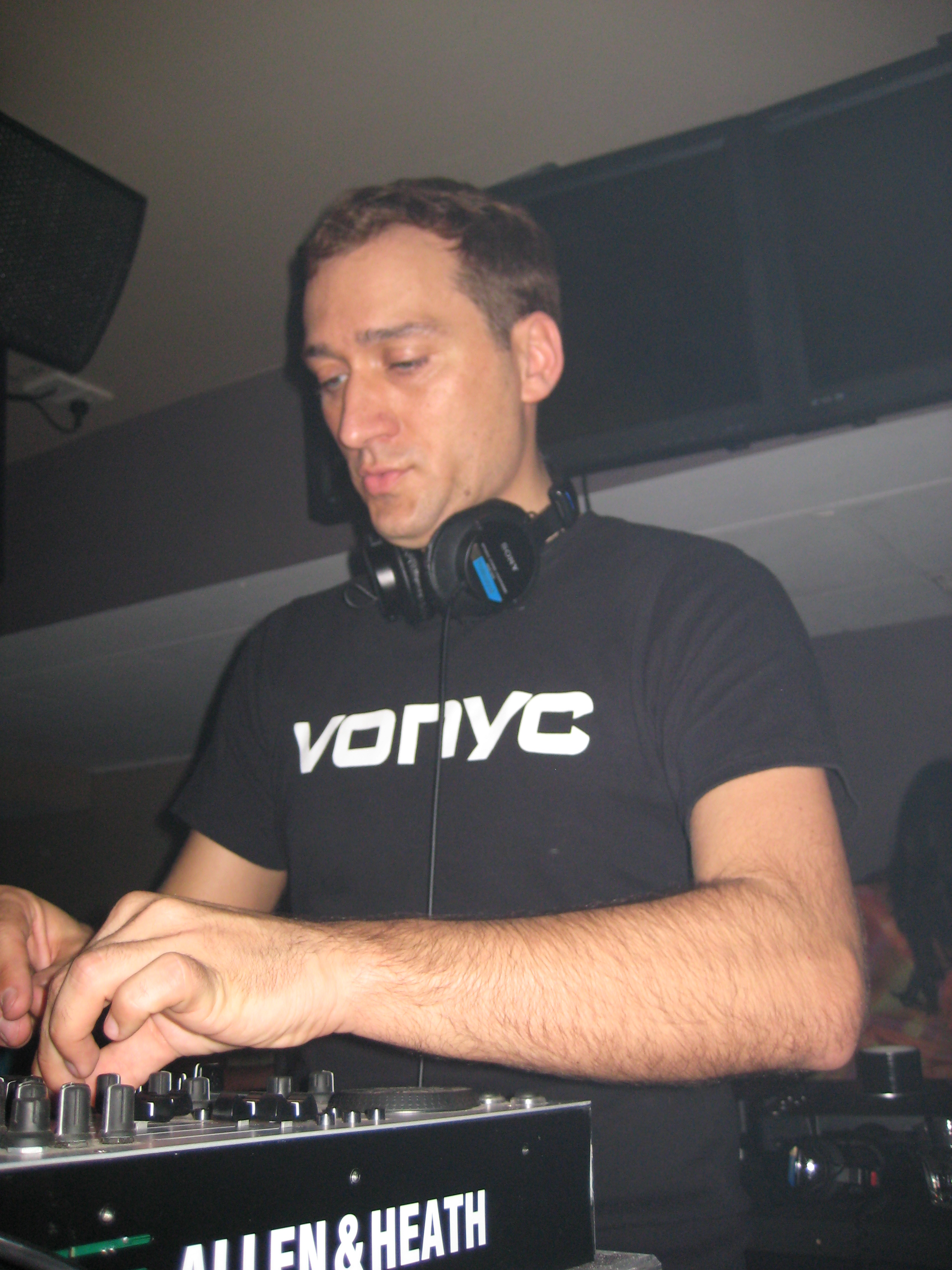
Paul van Dyk

- Lilly Palmer
- Pants & Corset
- The Partysquad
- DJ Paulette, (real name Paulette Constable born 22 December 1966), original resident DJ @ Flesh, The Haçienda and Radio FG presenter.
- Paul Oakenfold (born 1963), British record producer and remixer; two-time winner of DJ Magazine's World's No. 1 DJ in 1998 and 1999.
- Paul Rudd (DJ) (born 1979), British DJ, songwriter, record producer, recording artist, label owner and remixer
- Paul van Dyk (real name Mathias Paul; born 1971), German trance DJ who earned DJMag's top 100 DJ list No. 1 DJ award in 2005 and again in 2006
- PAWSA, British tech-house DJ
- Darren Pearce
- Dave Pearce
- Pedro Cazanova (real name Pedro Penedo), DJ/Producer from Lisbon Portugal
- Perel
- Phil Reynolds, hard house DJ
- The Prodigy, British electronic music group formed by Liam Howlett in 1990.

== Q ==
- Quintino (Dutch EDM DJ)
- Quentin Harris

== R ==
- Rachel Auburn, British hard house DJ
- Redfoo, American rapper and DJ
- Roger Sanchez (The DJ of DJs), Grammy Award winner, four time DJ Awards recipient, and MTV Europe Music Awards nominee
- R3hab (real name Fadil El Ghoul), Dutch DJ and record producer of Moroccan and Algerian origin.
- Ricardo Villalobos, German DJ known for minimal techno, repeatedly came first in Resident Advisor's Top 100 DJs of the year list
- Richie Hawtin, Detroit techno pioneer, leading exponent of minimal techno since the mid-1990s, founder of Minus Records, arguably the largest and best-known techno label
- Richie Kidd
- Rob Tissera, British hard house DJ and producer
- Robert Miles (real name Roberto Concina, 1969–2017), Italian DJ, composer, and producer most famous for the seminal trance track "Children"
- Ron Hardy
- Ross Mitchell, South African DJ producer based in London, UK; noted for mixing techno, house, and drum and bass
- Porter Robinson (born 1992)
- Robin Schulz
- Ran-D (real name Randy Wieland, born 18 May 1981 in Zeeland), Dutch DJ and music producer. His genre is hardstyle.

== S ==
- Salvatore Ganacci
- Steve Angello (full name Steven Angello Josefsson Fragogiannis, born 1982), Greek-born Swedish DJ/producer; member of the Swedish House Mafia
- Steve Aoki
- Sash!, German DJ production team
- Sasha (born Alexander Paul Coe 1969), British DJ, record producer and Grammy Award nominee. He was voted World No. 1 DJ by DJ Magazine in 2000 he is a 4 time International Dance Music Awards winner and 4 time DJ Awards winner.
- Sander van Doorn (real name Sander Ketelaars), Dutch Trance DJ
- Sandra Collins (American DJ/Producer Electronic Dance Music)
- Sandro Silva
- SebastiAn (real name Sebastian Akchoté-Bozovic)
- Nick Sentience, British hard house and techno-trance DJ
- Sharkey, happy hardcore DJ and producer
- Showtek (Sjoerd and Wouter Janssen), Electronic dance music, progressive/electro house
- Sidney Samson, DJ best known for his Dutch House
- Skazi, Israeli DJ/producer duo composed of Asher Swissa and Assaf B-Bass, famous for mixing trance with rock music
- Skrillex (real name Sonny John Moore), American electronic dance music producer, DJ, singer, songwriter and multi-instrumentalist. (Also works in collaboration with Diplo as Jack Ü)
- Sky Blu, American rapper and DJ
- Sky Rompiendo, Colombian, Producer and DJ
- Slushii (real name Julian Scanlan), American electronic dance music producer and DJ
- Smokin Jo (real name Joanne Joseph), playing style genres include house, techno, deep house the only female to win DJ Magazine's Worlds No 1 DJ award in 1992.
- DJ Snake
- Solomun, German house and techno DJ, producer and three-time DJ Awards winner
- Sophie Francis
- starRo, Grammy nominated Japanese producer / DJ
- Swedish House Mafia, Swedish supergroup consisting of Axwell, Steve Angello, and Sebastian Ingrosso (Active)
- Sander Kleinenberg
- Daz Saund, British Indian club DJ and Remixer from London, England. OriginalTrade resident DJ.
- Sven Väth, DJ known as "Papa Sven" in Germany's techno scene and three time DJ Awards winner. His longest set has been 30 hours.

== T ==
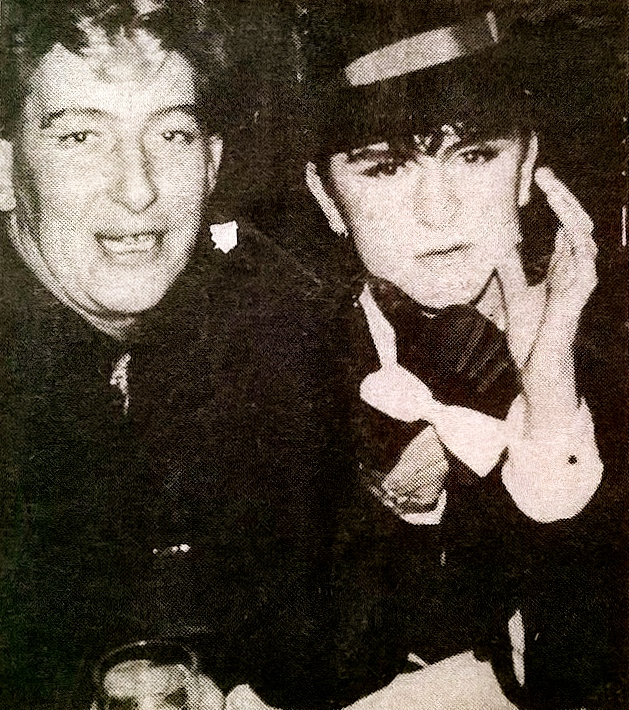
Circus Circus opening 1983 (Tallulah (left) Steve Strange (right))

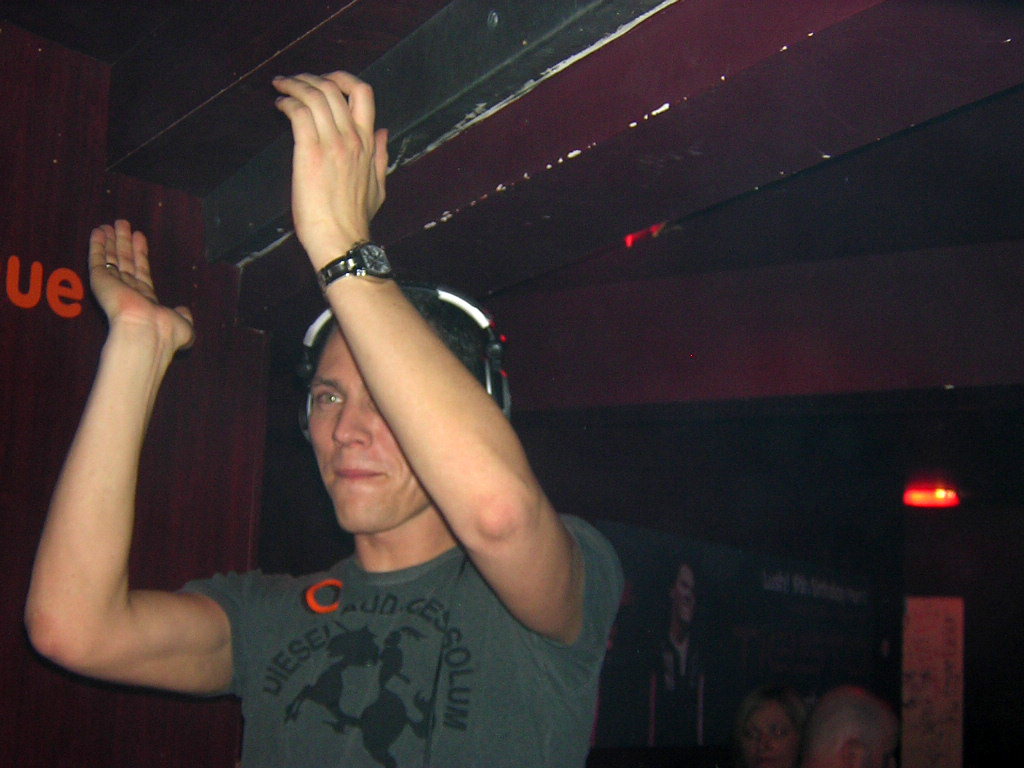
Tiësto

- Tale Of Us
- Tallulah, London DJ that had a career spanning over 35 years
- Tanith, influential techno DJ and Tresor resident who is considered one of the founders of the German techno culture.
- Tchami
- Tee Scott (real name Marc Allen Scott), disco DJ at the NYC club Better Days from 1976 to 1981, then resident at Zanzibar, and remixer of many classics
- Technikal
- The Advent, Techno DJ/Producer
- Tiësto (real name Tijs Michiel Verwest), Dutch trance, electro house, and techno DJ
- Tidy Boys, UK-based hard house duo
- Tiga
- Jean F. Cochois, aka Timewriter
- TJR, (musician), EDM producer, American DJ
- Tommy Trash (real name Thomas Olsen), Australian DJ known for producing house music
- Pete Tong, BBC Radio One DJ as well as Frequent club performer
- Tonka (real name Thomas-René Gerlach), German electronic music artist (DJ and Re mixer)
- Tony De Vit pioneering Hard House Hard NRG DJ and resident of the infamous Trade Club London voted as one of the Top 10 DJ's of all time by Mix Magazine UK in 2011.
- Tony Humphries, 35-year veteran of the NYC club scene and a former resident at New Jersey nightclub Zanzibar
- Tony Junior
- Tom Novy, German house DJ and producer since the 1990s
- Tom Swoon, best known Polish progressive house DJ
- Tomcraft, German techno DJ and producer, most known for his track Loneliness
- Trentemøller
- DJ Trevi
- Tritonal, American DJ's/producers

== U ==
- Umek (real name Uroš Umek), Slovenian dance-music composer and DJ
- Ummet Ozcan, Turkish-Dutch DJ and producer

== V ==
- Vinylgroover

== W ==
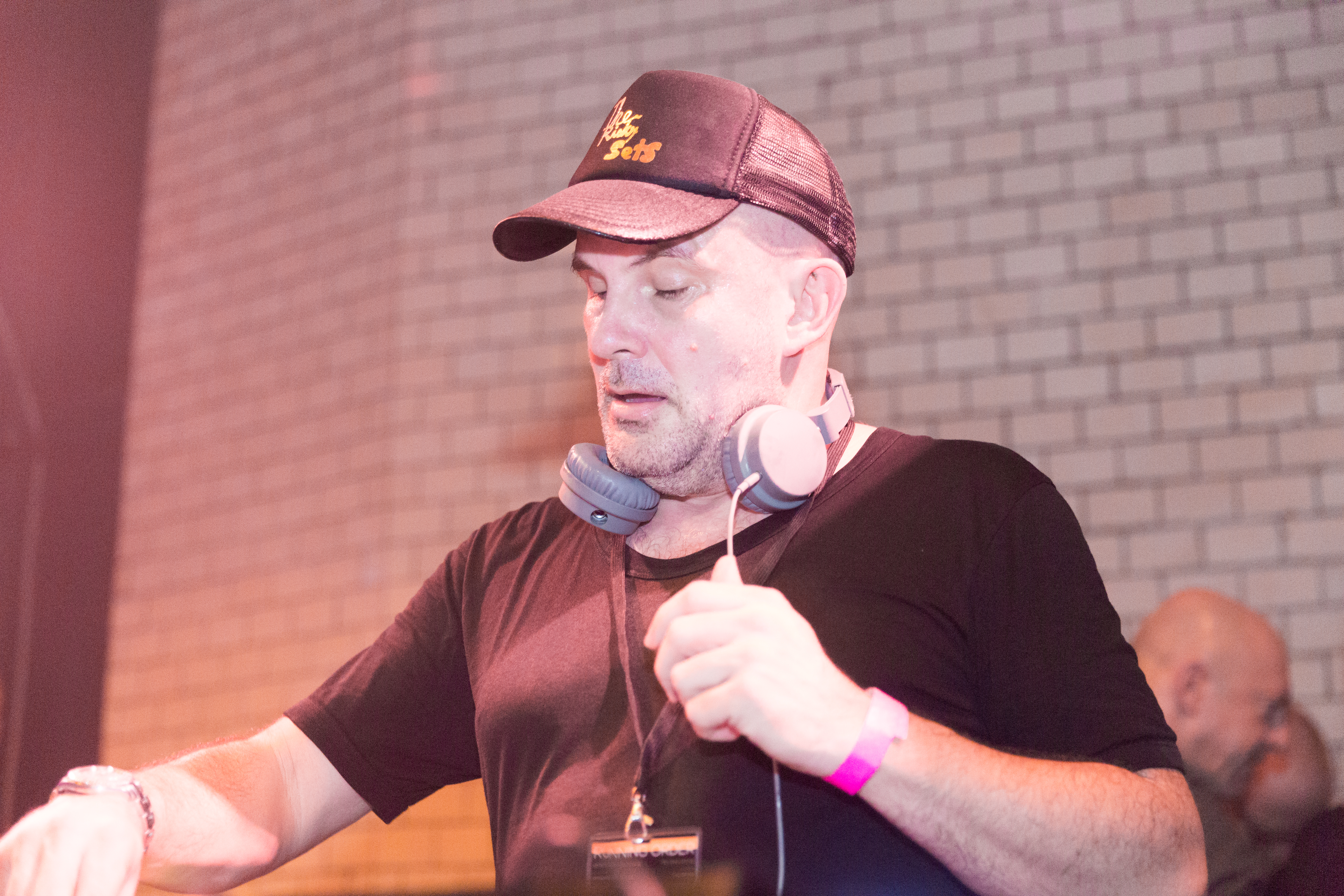
WestBam

- Walshy Fire
- W&W
- Wildstylez (real name Joram Metekohy), DJ from the Netherlands
- Wolfgang Gartner, DJ originally from Texas, US
- WestBam (real name Maximilian Lenz), DJ from Germany
- Will Sparks Australian DJ, best known for playing Melbourne bounce
- Willy William
- Weird Genius

== X ==
- X-Press 2

== Y ==
- Yves V, Belgian DJ/producer
- Yellow Claw, trap producers

== Z ==
- Zomboy (real name Joshua Mellody), British DJ and producer
- Zaeden (real name Sahil Sharma), Indian DJ and music producer
- Zedd (real name Anton Zaslavski), Russian-German DJ and musician
- Zeds Dead, Canadian DJ duo and producers
- Zight, (real name Yau Yiu Ting, born 1988), Chinese Hong Kong DJ and music producer

== See also ==
- Top 100 DJs
- Styles of house music
- List of deep house music artists
- List of progressive house artists
- List of electronic music record labels
- List of electro house artists
- List of electronic music genres
- List of electronic music festivals
- List of house music artists
- List of tropical house music artists
