= Lisa Lashes =

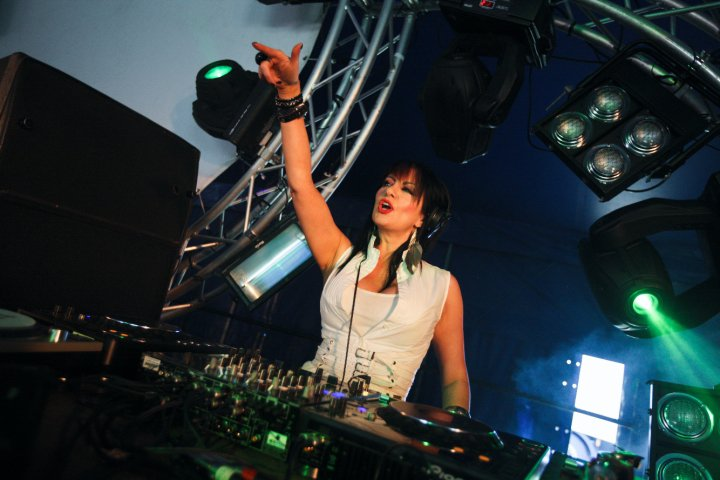
- Lisa Lashes at Escape into the Park in June 2010

Background information
- Also known as: DJ Lisa Lashes, Lashes, Origin-L
- Born: Lisa Dawn Rose-Wyatt; 23 April 1971 (age 55); Coventry, England
- Genres: Techno, tech house, hard house, trance
- Occupations: DJ, music producer
- Years active: 1996–present
- Label: Lashed Music (2007–present)
- Website: www.djlisalashes.com

Lisa Dawn Rose-Wyatt (born on 23 April 1971 in Coventry, England), known by her stage name Lisa Lashes, is an English electronic dance music DJ and producer known for mixing numerous Euphoria albums and her Lashed dance music events. She has headlined European and international music festivals such as Global Gathering, Creamfields, Nocturnal Wonderland and Dance Valley, UK events such as Godskitchen, Gatecrasher, Inside Out and Planet Love. She has toured China, Canada, the US, Russia, Australia and New Zealand.

== Career ==
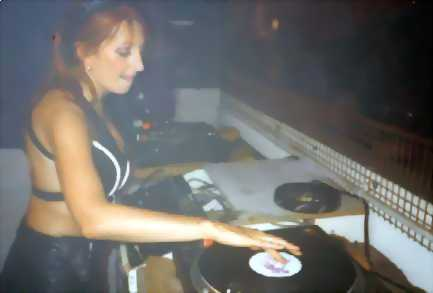
Lisa Lashes at The Refinery in 2005

Lisa Dawn Rose-Wyatt was born in Holbrooks, Coventry, where she grew up with her mother, father, three sisters, and two brothers. Raised as a Jehovah's Witness, on Sundays, Lisa would attend meetings and do door-to-door preaching with her parents to hand out The Watchtower and read from the Bible. In her early years, Lisa went to John Shelton School, then to President Kennedy Comprehensive School and at 16, joined a 2-year youth training scheme with Marks & Spencer, where she worked for eight years.

Lisa first discovered a passion for dance music when she began clubbing at events such as Miss Moneypenny's and Chuff Chuff, where she saw her favourite DJs of that time: Lisa Loud, John Kelly and the late Tony De Vit.

=== 1993–2003: Early ===
Lisa Lashes first emerged as a DJ in 1992. In 1995, she performed at a friend's boat party, where she met Sundissential promoter Paul Madan or 'Madders'; following which she was offered a residency at the Sunday club in Birmingham.

In 1999, the Tidy Boys recruited Lisa Lashes to help Tidy Trax producing "The Tidy Girls EP" alongside Rachel Auburn, Lisa Pin-Up and Anne Savage. The "Tidy Girls EP" reached 96 in the UK official singles chart, and the tracks were some of the first in the UK "bounce" style.

Her single release "Unbelievable" spent four weeks in the United Kingdom official singles chart, peaking at No. 63 in July 2000. Two years later, in 2002, a follow-up release of "Unbelievable," remixed with trance artists Lab 4, reached 78 in the same chart. In October 2003, the single "What Can You Do 4 Me?", released on Tidy Trax, achieved her highest UK singles chart position at number 52.

In 2000, Lisa Lashes was voted by readers of DJ Magazine in their annual top 100 list of the most popular DJs, the first and only female to date among the top ten DJs in the world.

=== 2003–2010: The Launch of Lashed ===
In 2003, Lisa Lashes launched her 'Lashed events' in Ibiza. Having held residencies in Ibiza for several years, playing Godskitchen, Judgement Sundays, Slinky, and Tonic, Lisa wanted to create something unique. For 15 weeks in the summer of 2003, Lashed in Ibiza took over the iconic nightclub 'Eden' in the heart of the San Antonio waterfront, and it quickly became a sell-out event. To bring Lashed to a global audience, Lisa partnered with Nettwerk Management to promote Lashed at the premiere dance music event, taking Lashed to China, Canada, America, the Netherlands, Australia, New Zealand, and Japan.

=== 2010–Present: Transition to trance and techno ===
Lisa Lashes launched her trance-based Lashed Podcast on iTunes and her website in April 2010. The monthly podcast garnered 90,000 subscribers within the first year. Lisa Lashes began producing trance music with her debut release 'Election Day,' being signed to Marcel Woods' Musical Madness label. She went on to release on labels such as Discover Dark, High Contrast, Reset Records and her own Lashed Music label, some of which received support from leading trance artists Armin van Buuren, Paul van Dyk and Judge Jules. Since her transition to trance music Lisa has performed at major trance events such as A State of Trance 550 in Den Bosch, Holland, Nocturnal Wonderland in California and Gatecrasher in Shanghai, she continues to tour and perform worldwide.

== Discography ==
=== Albums and compilations ===
- Slinky (1999)
- Hard House Euphoria Volume 1 (2000)
- Lashed! (2000)
- The Tidy Girls Annual (2001)
- Extreme Euphoria Volume 1 (2002)
- Extreme Euphoria Volume 2 (2002)
- Extreme Euphoria Volume 3 (2003)
- Extreme Euphoria Volume 4 (2003)
- Get Lashed in Australia (2004)
- Summer Bangers (2004)
- Lashed (2005)
- Lashed Euphoria (2006)
- The Very Best of Extreme Euphoria (2007)
- Lisa Lashes (2007)
- Goodgreef Xtra Hard (2009)
- Hard Dance Icons 003 (2010)

=== Singles and EPs ===
- Tidy Girls EP (1999, Tidy Trax, with Rachel Auburn)
- Sundissential EP (1999, Tidy Trax, with Paul Kershaw)
- Unbelievable / Dance 2 The House (Don't Go) (2000, Tidy Trax)
- Lookin' Good (2000, Tidy Trax)
- Unbelievable (2000, Tidy Trax)
- Unbelievable (2002, Tidy Trax, Lisa Lashes vs Lab 4)
- What Can You Do 4 Me? (2003, Tidy Trax)
- Dance 2 The House - I'm In Control (2004, Tidy Trax, with Jon Bishop)
- Desire (2005, Gravity Trapp)
- Deadbeat (2005, Riot! Recordings)
- Can't Sleep (2007, Lashed Music)
- Always Faithful (2007, Lashed Music)
- Lashed Track (2008, Lashed Music)
- Zipp It! (2008, Lashed Music)
- Has It Come To This? (2009, Lashed Music)
- Nu Religion (2009, Kiddfectious)
- Disarray (2009, Lashed Music)
- Bondage & Whips (2009, Lashed Music)
- Dancefloor Orgy (2010, Lashed Music)
- Release Me (2010, Siren Trax)
- Bring on In / 12 Hours in Brixton (2010, Discover Dark)
- Lashed Theme (2010, Lashed Music)
- Election Day (2010, Musical Madness)
- F33L (2010, Lashed Music)
- Hold Tight (2010, Lashed Music)
- Emotions (2010, Lashed Music)
- 52 Degrees (2011, Reset Records)
- High Vision (2011, High Contrast)
- Numero Uno (2011)
- Mandala (2011)
- The Bends (2011)
- Illusionize (2011)
- Snapshot (2012)
- Interconnect (2012)
- Harmonic Degree (2013)
- Topaz (2013)
- Wanted To Feel (2013, Lashed Music)
- Kaleidoscope (2013, Fraction Records)
- ARPwave (2014, Pharmacy)
- Virus (2014 Fraction Records)
- What You Know (2014)

– exclusive to Social Deconstruction

- Mind Control (2012, Lashed Music)
