= Guyver (DJ) =

British hard trance musician

- Born: Guy Mearns; 1984 or 1985 (age 41–42)
- Origin: Hull, England
- Genres: Hard Trance
- Occupations: Record producer, DJ
- Label: Tidy Trax
- Website: www.madeartists.co.uk/guyver

Guy Mearns (born 1984 or 1985), known professionally as Guyver, is a British hard trance disc jockey and record producer. He has also released music under the alias Kronos, and with his brother Gavin as Riot Brothers.

== Career ==
Mearns is from Hull, England. His music career started at age 17 in c. 2002, releasing music under the alias Riot Brothers with his brother Gavin. The duo had a number of chart hits including "Ripped Out" in 2002, and "Music is the Drug"/"Guyver Unit" with Lee Haslam in 2005. By age 20 Mearns, now under the alias Guyver, had 6 releases on the Tidy Two record label and was achieving success both on the UK hard trance music scene and the international touring circuit. In 2002 Guyver's single "Man On The Moon", termed a "classic" hard dance track by Mixmag, peaked at number 18 on the UK Dance Chart. In 2003 he released the mix album Resonate 3 on Tidy Trax to positive acclaim, and in 2005 his track with Rob Tissera, "Feel The Drums", peaked on the UK dance chart at number 24.

Mearns also releases music under the alias Kronos, including the 2012 track "Do You Know Hoov I Am" which received an 8/10 rating by Mixmag. In 2018 Guyver released the Kickstarter-funded album Alien on Earth. It received a positive 4/5 review by DMC World magazine which called it a "banging, polished set of 13 tracks". In 2023 he released a further album, Sine Language.

== Discography ==
Singles
Title	Year	Peak UK Singles	Peak UK Dance	Notes
"Serious Sound" / "You'll Know It"	2002	78	12	
"Man on the Moon"	2002	80	18	
"Ripped Out"	2002	89	20	as Riot Brothers
"Flashback"	2002	85	24	as Riot Brothers
"Trapped" / "Differences"	2003	72	7	
"Possibly"	2004	81	10	with Euphony
"Feel The Drums"	2005	81	24	with Rob Tissera
"Music is the Drug" / "Guyver Unit"	2005	96		as Riot Brothers with Lee Haslam
"Persistence" / "The Missing Channel"	2005		12	
"Do You Know Hoov I Am"	2012			as Kronos

Albums
Title	Year	Artist
Resonate 3 - The Brutal Sound Of Hard Trance	2003	Various/mixed by Guyver
Producer Series Vol. 2	2007	Guyver
Alien on Earth	2018	Guyver
Sine Language	2023	Guyver
