= Paul Maddox =

British dance music disc jockey

- Origin: Chesterfield, Derbyshire
- Genres: Hard trance, Hard dance
- Occupation(s): disc jockey, record producer
- Labels: Tidy Trax
- Website: www.spektre.co.uk

Paul Maddox is a British hard house and techno disc jockey and record producer. He has released several tracks that charted in the UK singles chart, and is one half of the techno duo Spektre. Maddox also releases music under the alternate moniker Olive Grooves.

== Biography ==
Maddox, originally from Chesterfield but based in Sheffield, first came to prominence when he was signed to Tidy Trax on the back of his remix of Set You Free by N-Trance. In 2002 his follow-up single, "Revolution", had a 5* review in Muzik magazine and peaked at number 29 on the UK Independent Singles and Albums Charts. Maddox followed up in September 2002 with second single "Tension". In February 2003 the cover CD of the Mixmag magazine featured a "Tidy vs Frantic" mix between Maddox and Tom Harding, where he was termed the "nutty bovine". In 2013 Maddox released the single "Got Power" on the Tripoli Trax label, which received an 8/10 review in Mixmag.

Maddox also releases music under the alternate moniker Olive Grooves, with a more "funky" and "groove-laced" focus. As Grooves he collaborated with Ross Homson in 2014 to release the single "Always There", which was a Mixmag Tune of the Month for February.

=== Spektre ===
Along with Rich Wakley, Maddox is half of techno duo Spektre. Formed c. 2005, Spektre is known for "unique, club-ready sounds". The duo released their debut album, Casting Shadows Without Light in 2010, followed by Cyclic Operations in 2013. Spektre's third album, Against a Dark Background, featuring both breakbeat and "synth-heavy techno", was released in 2020.

== Discography ==
Paul Maddox singles
Title	Artist	Year	Peak UK singles	Peak UK dance	Peak UK Ind
"Revolution/Raid"	Paul Maddox	2002			29
"Tension"	Paul Maddox	2002			26
"New York New York"	Paul Maddox & DJ GRH	2003	91	31	29
"Reach Out"	Paul Maddox ft. Niki Mak	2003	86	26	15
"Scared/Tension"	Tomorrow People/Paul Maddox	2003			29
"Synthosauraus"	Paul Maddox ft. Niki Mak	2003	86	20	16
"In it for kicks/Have faith"	Paul Maddox	2006			42
"Got Power"	Paul Maddox	2013			
"Always There"	Olive Grooves & Ross Homson	2014			
"Retrograde"	Spektre	2018			
"Badlands"	Spektre	2023			
