= Yoji (DJ) =

Yoji Biomehanika
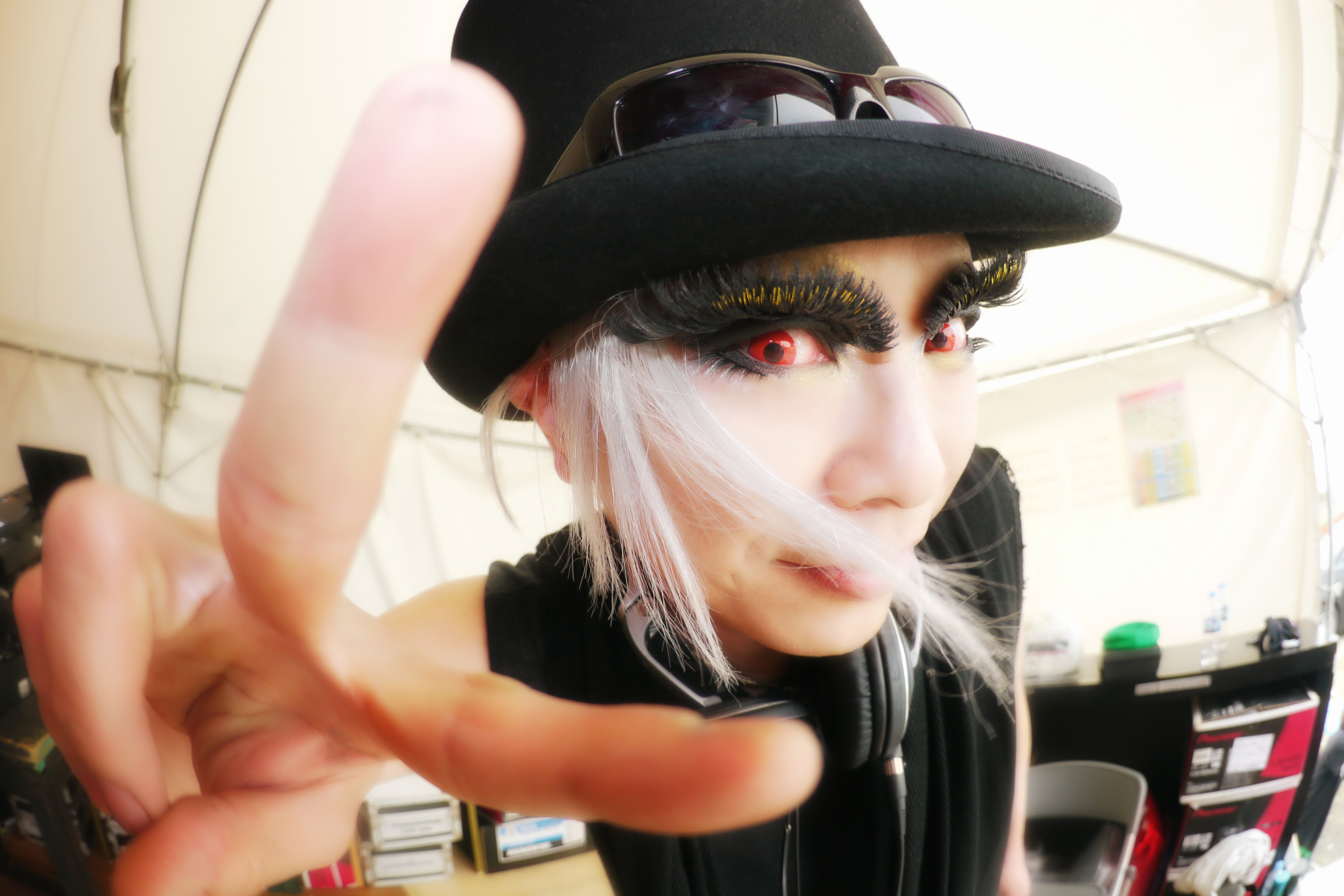

Background information
- Born: Yoji Mabuchi
- Origin: Kobe, Japan
- Genres: Hard trance, NRG, tech trance
- Years active: 1981–present
- Labels: Hellhouse, Hellhouse Digital, Avex Trax, dieTunes
- Website: yojibiomehanika.net

Yoji Mabuchi, known professionally as Yoji Biomehanika, and also known as YOJI, Mutant DJ, Ozaka Oz, Bionico, Biomehanika, Yōran and The Arcade Nation, is a Japanese trance/hard trance DJ. A household name in the Japanese club scene in the 1990s, Yoji entered the international scene in 2001 when he was featured in the lineup for the Dance Valley music festival in the Netherlands in front of 90,000 people. He then started headlining some of the largest international music events such as Sensation Black, Tomorrowland and Street Parade. He is now considered one of the icons of hard dance music.

== Career ==
Yoji's style of music has changed throughout his career, starting off in the 1980s as Yōran, and for a time a member of Japanese punk band Laughin' Nose. He began DJing trance music in the 1990s before moving into the tougher variants of hard trance and NRG by the start of the 2000s. He produced many hard trance anthems during this time, including his most well known tracks of "Hardstyle Disco" and "Samurai".

In April 2005, in his Yoji Biomehanika guise, Yoji recorded an Essential Mix for broadcast by Pete Tong on BBC Radio 1.

In 2007, Yoji dropped his 'Yoji Biomehanika' alias and changed to a new style of music with the release of "Techy Techy". Yoji calls the style Tech Dance and can be described as a mix between Hard Dance and Techno, mainly characterised by its speed, offbeat rhythms and energy. Further accentuated by Yoji's energetic performance style, Tech Dance has become a genre in its own right, with artists such as Joe-E, Vandall & Remo-con all producing this style of music. The latest releases on Yoji's Hellhouse label have been in this style of music.

Early on in 2012, Yoji announced via his Ameba blog that his Hellhouse label was being shut down to make way for a new label project entitled "dieTunes". The official site and the label itself was launched in June, with the first 3 official releases in July that same year.

In early 2015, Yoji announced on his Ameba blog, website and other social media outlets that he was moving back to his previous alias of Yoji Biomehanika after feeling that he had drifted away from Tech Dance and back to more "big room" sounds. With a studio album in the works for release in June 2015 and an artist album celebrating 25 years of his work in music, Yoji also announced a new single to be released around the same time.

Yoji has been named one of the world's top 100 DJs three times, in the DJ Mag annual poll. His highest position was number 32, in 2005.

== Discography ==
=== Albums ===
- Technicolor NRG Show (2001)
- Tales From the Big Room (2004)
- Chapter X (2015)

=== Compilations ===
- Greatest Works (2002)
- X Years of Hellhouse (2010)
- A Quarter Century Of Yoji Biomehanika (2017)

=== Mix compilations ===
- Nu NRG Party (1997)
- NRG Essence (1999)
- NRG Essence 2 (2000)
- NRG Essence 2001 (2001)
- Yoji Biomehanika Presents Lab 4 In The Mix (2001)
- The Future of Hard Dance 1 & 2 (2003)
- Music for the Harder Generation Volume 2 (2003)
- Goodgreef: Album 3 (CD2 only) (2005)
- Pharmacy Vol. 4 - Reign in Blood (2006)
- GIGA Tech Dance Extreme (2007)
- Tech Dance Euphoria: Mixed By YOJI (2008)
- ЦЕХ 2009: Hellhouse Techdance Treatment (2009)
- VIBLE 01: Mixed By YOJI (2010)
- VIBLE 03: Mixed By YOJI (2011)
- FABTASTICA -The Black Album- (b2b George-S) (2012)
- dieTunes LABEL SAMPLER 01 - YOJI IN THE MIX (2013)
- The Weekender Has Landed: Mixed By YOJI (2014)
- MUSIC CIRCUS '14 BLACK STAGE ANTHEMS: Compiled & Mixed By YOJI (2014)

=== Singles ===
==== As Yoji Biomehanika ====
- Party is my life (1994)
- Rendezvous de telepathy (1994)
- Blinded By The Trance/Blinded By The NRG (1994)
- Expect EP (1997)
- Go Mad (1999)
- Seduction (1999)
- Anasthasia 2001 (2000)
- Look @ The Heaven (2000)
- Look @ The Heaven (The Remix Which Dedicated To Impulz x Dance Valley) (2001)
- Big in Japan EP (2001)
- Do The Nasty (2001)
- A Theme From Banginglobe (2002)
- Ding A Ling (2002)
- Look @ The Heaven “Gatecrasher NEC Edit” (2002)
- Never End (2003)
- Hardstyle Disco (2003)
- Samurai/The Rain (2004)
- Monochroma (2005)
- The Place For Freedom (with MC Stretch) (2015)
- Wake Up To Reality (2015)
- Let's Go (exclusive track sold as part of A2K-AID TO KUMAMOTO-) (2016)
- Storm (2016)
- It's A Dream (2017)
- Life Is An Illusion (with Phantazm) (2018)
- Still Here (with Francesco Zeta) (2018)
- Warriors (with Skyron & MC Stretch) (2018)
- Unleash the Urge (with Lady Faith & DJ Stephanie) (2019)
- A Theme From Banginglobe (2019 Reworked Mix) (2021)
- Ding A Ling (2022 Reworked Mix) (2022)
- Seduction (2022 Reworked Mix) (2022)
- Recovery (2022 Reworked Mix) (2022)
- Look @ The Heaven (A Reworked Mix For Agefarre 2022) (2022)
- Anasthasia 2001 (2023 Reworked Mix) (2023)

==== As Yoji (or YOJI) ====
- Techy Techy (2008)
- Airport (2009)
- Don't Wake Me From The Dream (2009)
- From Flower To Flower (2009)
- Don't Wake Me From The Dream (2010 Summer Edition) (2010)
- Surrender (2010)
- Sandwich EP (2011)
- Samulight (VS Remo-con) (2012)
- Theme Of Get Hi-Tech (2012)
- Alone (with HEAVYGRINDER) (2013)
- Needs (2013)
- Evil Mushroom (2014)

==== As Biomehanika ====
- Fade To White (2010)
- The Key (exclusive track sold after the Japanese earthquake of March 2011)

==== As Mutant DJ ====
- Hardhouse Raver (2004)
- B-Raver (2004)
- Amsterdam Waar Lech Dat Dan? (Remix of Euromasters - Amsterdam Waar Lech Dat Dan) (2006)

==== As Bionico ====
- Peace Out (1997)
- Peace Out 21st Century Remix (2001)

==== As The Arcade Nation ====
- Theme Of Arcade Nation (2011)
- Dance Electric (2013)
- Magma (2013)
- Amigo (with YOJI) (2014)

==== In collaboration with Romeo Toscani ====
- Acid Spunk (2006)
- Six Hours (2007)
- Wanna F**kin’ Dance? (2010)

==== As George-S with YOJI ====
- A Secret Gathering (2011)

== Remixes ==
=== As Yoji Biomehanika ===
- K.G.P. – Night Waves (1995)
- B-Voice – Eternity (1996)
- DJ Dag & Non Eric (1997)
- Last Bronx – SEGA (1997)
- Chris C – Fools Gold (1999)
- Nish – The Philosophy Of Religion (1999)
- 19 Kisses Go To Disko – Groove Me (1999)
- Chris C – Fire On The Moon (2000)
- West End Boys – Why Not? (2000)
- Chris C – Freefall (2001)
- Energy UK DJs – Gonzo (2002)
- Arome – Hands Up (2003)
- Trance Generators – Wildstyle Generation (2003)
- Eurotrash – Get Up Get Down (2003)
- Gouryella – Ligaya (2004)
- Mauro Picotto – Iguana (2004)
- Heavens Cry – Till Tears Do Us Part (2004)
- Darude - Sandstorm
- IK – X Bass (2004)
- Blutonium Boy – Dark Angel (2007)
- Atomizer – Time To Time 2007 (2007)
- Yoji Biomehanika - Look @ The Heaven (2015 Own Rework)
- Felguk - This Life (2016)
- Yoji Biomehanika - Hardstyle Disco (2018 Reverse Bass Edit) (2018)

=== As Yoji Biomehanika & Romeo Toscani ===
- A*S*Y*S* – Acid Flash (2005)
- Dark By Design – Black Out (2005)
- Dave202 – Vulcania (2005)
- Derb – Satisfaktion (2006)

=== As Yoji (or YOJI) ===
- Scott Attrill – Existence (2008)
- Ayumi Hamasaki – Game (2008)
- Remo-con – G Sigh (2009)
- Joey V – Purity (2009)
- Night Liberator – Concentrate (2010)
- The Arcade Nation – Theme Of Arcade Nation (2011)
- Organ Donors - Cutting Edge (Exclusive for VIBLE 03)
- Organ Donors – Makes Girlies Wet (Exclusive for VIBLE 03)
- Eternal Rhythm – Eternal (2011)
- Laughin' Nose - Get The Glory (2013)
- DJ ni-21 - Driving The Bassline (Exclusive for dieTunes LABEL SAMPLER 01 - YOJI IN THE MIX)
