= Paul Glazby =

British hard house musician

- Born: 1977 or 1978 (age 48–49)
- Origin: Sheffield
- Genre: Hard house
- Occupations: Record producer, DJ
- Years active: c. 2000-2012
- Labels: Tidy Trax, Vicious Circles

Paul Glazby (born 1977 or 1978) is a hard house disc jockey and music producer from Sheffield, England. Known for his "harder" sound, he was mainly active in the period 2000-2012.

== Career ==
Glazby is from Sheffield, England. Starting off as a bedroom DJ, he had a rapid rise in popularity, was signed by Tidy Trax in 2000, and by 2001/2002 was performing at clubs such as Gatecrasher and touring in Australia. His music style is characterised as high tempo hard house. He also set up the Vicious Circles record label, releasing records by artists such as Pants & Corset. His music productions have charted in the UK on several occasions. Glazby remixes other artists tracks, such as the critically well received remix of "Recoil" by F1 in 2003. He has released mix albums including I Love VC in 2005, and Harddance Republic 2 in 2006. Glazby's 2005 track "Kick It", remixed in 2019 by Wayne German, was cited by Mixmag as "one of the most known and loved 'harder' hard house tracks".

Glazby has twice been listed in the DJ Mag world top 100 DJs poll, the highest at number 80 in 2003. He retired from performing live in 2012. As of 2024, Glazby is working as a realtor in Queensland, Australia.

== Discography ==
Singles
Title	Year	Peak UK Singles	Peak UK Ind	Notes
"Who Are You?"	2000	94	19	with Dynamic Intervention
"Here We Go"	2001		27	
"Locked Up"	2001		35	with Dynamic Intervention
"Beautiful"	2001	98	20	
"Can't Stop"	2002		47	with Ilogik
"Here I Come"	2002		30	
"I'm Your Nightmare" / "Funky Regulator"	2002		19	
"Motherfucker"	2002		22	
"Fuckin Hostile" / "PH 4"	2003		23	
"Acid Disco"	2003		49	with The Narcomaniacs
"Black Magic"	2004		44	vs Trauma
"I Need To Know"	2005		37	
"Kick It"	2005			
