= Lisa Pin-Up =

British EDM producer and DJ

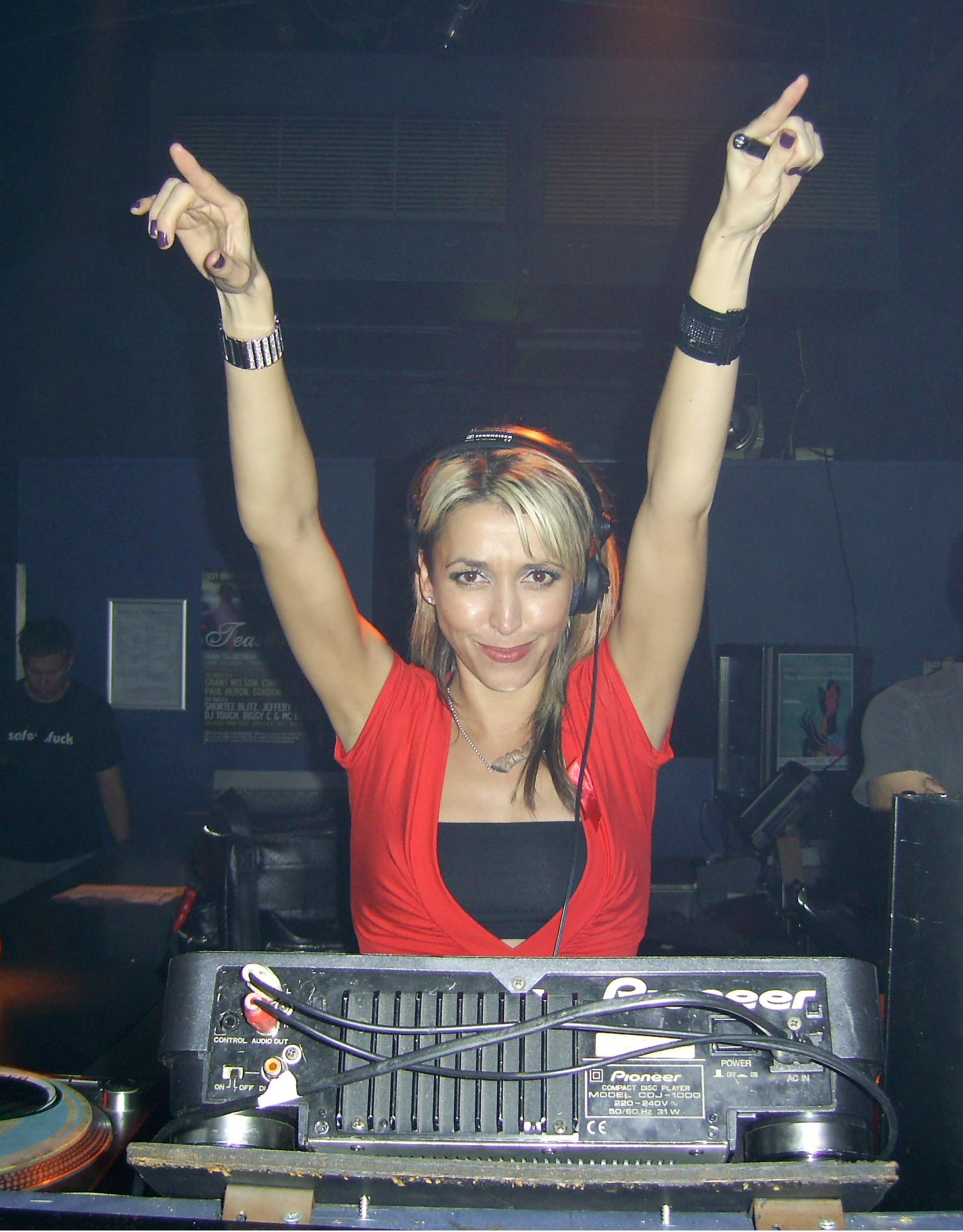
- Lisa Pin-Up playing at Heaven, London, 2 December 2006.

Background information
- Birth name: Lisa Chilcott
- Born: 1970 or 1971 (age 54–55); East End of London, England
- Genres: Hard house, electronic dance music
- Occupation(s): DJ, producer
- Instrument(s): Turntables, sampler
- Years active: 1996–present
- Labels: Nukleuz
- Website: www.lisapinup.com

Lisa Pin-Up (born Lisa Chilcott) is a British electronic dance music producer and DJ, whose career started in the 1990s. She is a hard house producer and part of the Nukleuz label. She is also a part-time model and ranked number 54 in Loaded's Hot 100 babes in 2002.

== Career ==
Before becoming a DJ, Pin-Up worked as a model, where she appeared in an early 1990s television advertisement for Nescafé.

In 1999 she teamed up with Lisa Lashes, Rachel Auburn and Anne Savage; jointly known as the Tidy Girls they released their eponymous EP which reached number 31 in the UK dance chart. Pin-Up has released a number of compilation mix albums, some of which have achieved chart success including Hard House Euphoria mixed with the Tidy Boys, which peaked at number 12 in the UK Compilation Chart in 2001. She has released several singles, two of which, "Turn Up The Sound" and "Blow Your Mind", both made the UK official singles chart top 75 in 2002.

== Discography ==
=== Singles ===
- Feel the Poison, by Lisa Pin-Up/Sugar The Pill (White label) (Released Oct 1998)
- Rock With Me, (on Tidy Girls EP) by Lisa Pin-Up (Tidy Trax) (Released June 1999)
- Freedom, by Lisa Pin-Up/Dirty Rotten Scoundrels (Devil May Care) (Released July 1999)
- Future Acid House, by Lisa Pin-Up (Nukleuz Records) (Released Feb 2000)
- What Would We Do?, by Lisa Pin-Up/Billy Daniel Bunter (Honey Pot) (Released March 2000)
- Music for the Masses '99, by Lisa Pin-Up and Tomislave(Released April 2000)
- To Love Is To Listen, by Lisa Pin-Up (Nukleuz Records) (Released April 2000)
- Such A Feeling, by Lisa Pin-Up/Gary Sharkie (Rock Hard Recordings) (Released June 2000)
- It's Not Over Yet, by Lisa Pin-Up/Gary Sharkie (Rock Hard Recordings) (Released July 2000)
- What It Does To Me, by Lisa Pin-Up/Billy Daniel Bunter (Rock Hard Recordings) (Released August 2000)
- Queens in the House, by Lisa Pin-Up/Modelle/Elvira (OTR Records) (Released September 2000)
- Biggest Baddest Mutha, by Lisa Pin-Up (Nukleuz Records) (Released October 2000)
- Another Jam, by Lisa Pin-Up/Modelle/Elvira (Rock Hard Recordings) (Released November 2000) Later signed to Nukleuz Records (Re-released April 2001)
- Sexy, by Lisa Pin-Up/Elvira (Rock Hard Recordings) (Released December 2000)
- DJs Make Ya Move, by Lisa Pin-Up/Modelle/Elvira (OTR Records) (Released January 2001)
- Fever, by Lisa Pin-Up (Rock Hard Recordings) (Released April 2001)
- Hard House Stompin', by Lisa Pin-Up (Rock Hard Recordings) (Released May 2001)
- To The Max, by Lisa Pin-Up (Rock Hard Recordings) (Released June 2001)
- To The Bone, by Lisa Pin-Up/Elvira on 23/7 (Ministry of Sound) (Released July 2001)
- Can't Top It, by Lisa Pin-Up (Nukleuz Records) (Released February 2002)
- It's Incredible, by Lisa Pin-Up (Cuttin Soundz) (Released March 2002)
- "Turn Up The Sound", by Lisa Pin-Up (Nukleuz Records) (Released April 2002) – UK No. 60
- Jump! Jump! Jump!, by Lisa Pin-Up vs London Fiesta (Cuttin Soundz) (Released May 2002)
- "Blow Your Mind (I am the Woman)", by Lisa Pin-Up (Nukleuz Records) (Released December 2002) – UK No. 60
- Sometimes We're Dancing/Don't Leave Me This Way, by Lisa Pin-Up (Nukleuz Records) (Released April 2003)
- Goes like this BANG! by Lisa Pin-Up (Nukleuz records) (released October 2003)
- Tie me up (DJ Nation) by Lisa Pin-Up (Nukleuz records) (Released March 2004)
- F**k this F**king, F**ck! by Lisa Pin-Up (Nukleuz records) (Release May 2004)
- Double sider There's a void (ecstasy)/I've had enough By Lisa Pin-Up (Nukleuz) [released October 2004]
- Party tonight By Lisa Pin-Up (Pin-Up Records) (released January 2005)
- Double sider:- Machine Gun Madness/Really like Cocaine By Lisa Pin-Up (Nukleuz records) [released May 2005]
- Double sider:- Be My Lover/Naughty Freak By Lisa Pin-Up (Nukleuz Records) [released October 2005]
- Lisa Pin-Up E.P:- Side 1)- Slave to your love, Side 2) What a wicked style By Lisa Pin-Up (Nukleuz records) [released 6 March 2006]
- Feel the beat By Lisa Pin-Up (Exclusive tracks)[released October 2007]

=== Remixes ===
- Biggest Baddest Mutha, by Lisa Pin-Up (The Remix) (Nukleuz Records) (released February 2001)
- Old Skool Flavours, by The Frisky Crew (Frisky Records) (Released March 2001)
- That's It, by Mr.Bishi (Y2K Records) (Released March 2001)
- Boom Jam, by Let's Shake (Rude Boy Records) (Released May 2001)
- How You Like Bass?, by Norman Bass – Substance (Ministry of Sound) (Released May 2001)
- Hey DJ, by Double Figures – 23/7 (Ministry of Sound) (Released June 2001)
- Bomb Thrush, by Organ Donors (Rock Hard Recordings) (Released August 2001)
- Be There, by Carlotta Chadwick (Rock Hard Recordings) (Released October 2001)
- The Drill, by The Dirt Devils (Nu-life Records) (Released February 2002)
- The Call To Power by Project 303 (Rock Hard Recordings) (Released February 2002)

=== Compilation albums ===
- The Sound of Freedom (Automatic Records) (Released September 1999)
- Raising Hell (Virgin) (Released July 2000)
- Hard House Nation (Warner Music) (Released September 2000; received gold disc for sales.)
- Hard House Nation 2 (Warner Music) (Released December 2000; received gold disc for sales)
- Hard House 3 (Warner Music) (Released March 2001)
- Hard House Euphoria (Telstar Records) (Released October 2001)
- Charlys Angelz Ibiza Distributed in Ibiza by the club Charlys Angelz(Released summer 2002)

=== Artist albums ===
- Biggest Baddest Mutha (Nukleuz Records) All 11 tracks produced by Lisa.(Released April 2003)
- Hard House Anthems 5 X-Rated (Nukleuz Records) (released March 2004)
- Infinity (Sony/BMG) (released 27 December 2004)
- Hard House Anthems vol 6 (Nukleuz) (released June 2005)
- Harddance Revolution (Nukleuz) (released June 2007)
- Tidy Weekender 9 (Tidy) (released July 2007)
