= Anne Savage (DJ) =

British hard dance DJ (born 1969)

- Born: 18 July 1969 (age 56); Burnley, Lancashire, England
- Genres: House, techno, electronic dance music, hard trance
- Occupation(s): Producer, DJ
- Website: http://www.djannesavage.com/

Anne Savage (born 18 July 1969) is a British hard dance DJ.

== Early life ==
Savage was born in Burnley, Lancashire, England, and raised in the Ribble Valley. She attended the private Westholme School. She took classical guitar lessons at an early age. In the late 1980s, she played guitar in a punk band called 53rd State.

== Career ==
Savage had her first UK DJ residency at Angels in Burnley and later resident at the infamous Vague Club, Leeds. She was also part of the original Tidy Girls line-up, with Lisa Lashes, Lisa Pin-Up, and Rachel Auburn. She has featured several times in DJ Magazine's 'World's Top 100 DJs' and was the only female listed in the 'Top 10 Club DJs in Britain' by the Independent on Sunday. She made regular DJ appearances for club events such as Tidy, Slinky, Frenzy, and Storm.

In April 2000 Savage's single release on the Tidy Trax label, "I Need A Man", peaked at number 6 in the UK dance singles chart. Her production of "Hellraiser" peaked at No. 74 in the UK Singles Chart in April 2003.

== Non-music career ==
=== Promoting ===
In 2013, Anne Savage joined on with Ultra DJ management where she managed the bookings and promoting of various DJs. Savage joined on with event host and promoter "WeLoveHardHouse" who host venues throughout the UK.

=== Television ===
Savage was brought on for an episode of Channel 4's "Faking It" where she attempted to coach a classic musician to become a DJ. The episode ended up winning a BAFTA in 2002 for best production team.
