= Resonate (album series) =

Hard trance music compilation album series

Compilation album by various artists
- Released: 2002-2021
- Genre: hard trance
- Label: Tidy Trax

Resonate - The Brutal Sound of Hard Trance is a compilation album series published on the Tidy Trax record label. Representative of the UK hard trance scene at the time, the series started in 2002 with volume 1, and completed in 2021 with Volume 12.

== History ==
The series begin in 2001 when Tidy Trax released the hard trance compilation Resonate 1 - The Brutal Sound of Hard Trance, mixed by Lee Haslam. In 2003 the second album in the series, Resonate 2, was released. Mixed by DJ The Freak, it received a 5* review from the Burton Daily Mail while Muzik magazine highlighted the lack of progression in the sound but finished their critical review with a call to "let's get BRUTAL!". Resonate 3 was released that same year. Mixed by DJ Guyver, it was strongly recommended by Greg Eyon writing for Upfront magazine. The fourth volume, again mixed by Haslam, peaked at number 67 in the UK Compilation Chart and received a 4/4 review from DJ Mag.

In 2012, Resonate 6 was released. Mixed by Technikal, the collection was named by Mixmag magazine as Compilation of the Month, who also highlighted how the series had "perfectly captured the UK hard trance sound". Resonate 7, featuring the "biggest hard trance anthems" also according to Mixmag, was released in 2015.

By 2021, the Tidy Trax sound, which had been waning in popularity, was starting to see a resurgence which saw the last Resonate, Volume 12 by Bryn Whiting and Adam Dixon, released.

== Series overview ==
Resonate releases
Title	Mixed by	Year	Peak UK Comp
Resonate 1	Lee Haslam	2002	
Resonate 2	The Freak	2003	
Resonate 3	Guyver	2003	
Resonate 4	Lee Haslam	2004	67
Resonate 5	Alphazone	2006	
Resonate 6	Technikal	2012	
Resonate 7	Technikal & NG Rezonance	2015	
Reson8	Lee Haslam & Technikal	2016	
Resonate 9	Signum & Nicholson	2019	
Resonate 10	Technikal & Costa Pantazis	2019	
Resonate 11	Lee Haslam	2020	
Resonate 12	Adam Dixon & Bryn Whiting	2021	

== See also ==
- Clubland X-Treme Hardcore (compilation series)
- Bonkers (compilation album series)
- Euphoria (compilations)
- Reactivate
