= Rachel Auburn =

British disc jockey and house music producer

- Born: July 1958 (age 67–68)
- Origin: London
- Genres: Trance, hard house
- Occupations: Disc jockey, record producer, fashion designer
- Labels: Tidy Trax, React

Rachel Auburn (born July 1958) is a British fashion designer and hard house and trance disc jockey and music producer. She has performed her music extensively internationally, and was both the first female DJ to play in China and the first to showcase 1980s London clubland fashion in New York and Tokyo. Auburn has held DJ residencies at club events including Tidy Trax, Taboo, and Trade, and has achieved UK chart success under her own name and the Tidy Girls and Candy Girls aliases.

== Biography ==
Auburn was born in Kingston upon Thames in 1958. She has a degree in fashion design from Harrow College.

Auburn is known for her "unconventional" and "experimental" fashion designs. She first set up a stall in Kensington Market in 1982, and went on to be a significant presence as both a designer and a disc jockey in London's clubland. She first met Leigh Bowery at the market, and together they went on to open a stall together called 'Spend Spend Spend' and were the first to showcase the 1980s London clubland fashion scene in New York and Tokyo organised by Susanne Bartsch. Auburn has work in the permanent collection of the National Gallery of Victoria, and was featured in the 2013 exhibition, Club to Catwalk, at the Victoria and Albert museum.

Along with Paul Masterson, Auburn formed the Candy Girls duo. Their single "Wham Bam", with Sweet Pussy Pauline, peaked at number 20 on the UK Singles Chart in 1996.

Auburn was in the Tidy Girls, a Tidy Trax hard house collaboration with Lisa Lashes, Anne Savage, and Lisa Pin-Up. The Tidy Girls eponymous release achieved success in the UK official singles chart in 1999. In 2015 Auburn mixed the retrospective best-of compilation Reactivate 91-01 for the React record label. It received positive critical reception, with one reviewer stating that, for the label React, it was "by far their best compilation".

== Discography ==
=== Albums ===
Rachel Auburn albums
Title	Artist	Year	Peak UK Comp
Reactivate '91 – '01	Various, mixed by Rachel Auburn	2015	

=== Singles ===
Rachel Auburn singles
Title	Artist	Year	Peak UK Singles	Peak UK Dance
"Fee Fi Fo Fum"	Candy Girls	1995	23	1
"Wham Bam"	Candy Girls featuring Sweet Pussy Pauline	1996	20	5
"I Want Candy"	Candy Girls	1996	30	12
"Machine Man"	Rachel Auburn	1997		38
Tidy Girls EP	Rachel Auburn/Lisa Lashes	1999	96	31
"Coming On Strong/Screwdriver"	Signum/Rachel Auburn	2006		25
