= Pants & Corset =

British hard house duo

- Origin: Bournemouth
- Genres: Hard house
- Years active: c. 1998-2003
- Members: Paul King, Chris B

Pants & Corset is a British hard house music group composed of Paul King and Chris B. Mainly active from the late 1990s to the early 2000s, they are known for chart hit "Malice in Wonderland".

== History ==
Pants & Corset are a Bournemouth-based music duo that formed in 1998 by members Paul King and Chris B. At the time King was also releasing music under the aliases Trauma and F1, and Chris B was running a record shop. According to Tidy Boys member Amadeus Mozart, the name "Pants & Corset" is derived as a malapropism of the duo's home counties, "Hants & Dorset". Their first single, the 1998 white label hard house track "Who Killed Kenny?", was based upon a previous release by Commander Tom and was produced for the 8th birthday of the Trade nightclub. Their second release, "Dammit Janet", was released in 1999 in the USA on the Strictly Rhythm label. It peaked at number 17 on the Billboard Dance Club Songs chart in February 2000, and achieved a 5* review in Muzik magazine.

In 2000 the duo released "Malice in Wonderland", a single produced in honour of Trade owner Laurence Malice. The track went on to peak at number 11 on the UK Dance Chart in 2004, and as of 2019 was continuing to be re-released. Music magazine Mixmag called it "one of the most loved tracks in hard house history". Also in 2000 they followed up with further single, "Sacrilege", so-named because it updated a previous Tony de Vit remix of revered track "Schöneberg". In 2003 the Pants & Corset release "K-Hole" received a 4* review from Muzik magazine.

Pants & Corset are also known to perform live at club nights, such as Sundissential, their tracks have appeared on compilation albums such as Harder Faster Deeper in 2003, and they are also known for their remixing work.

== Discography ==
Singles
Title	Year	Peak UK Singles	Peak UK Dance	Billboard Club Play
"Who Killed Kenny?"	1998			
"Dammit Janet"	1999			17
"Malice in Wonderland"	2000/2004	77	11	
"Sacrilege"	2000			
"Wonderland"	2002			
"K-Hole"	2003			
"Bounce"	2003			
"Malice in Wonderland" (Ben Stevens remix)	2019			
