= Billy Daniel Bunter =

British dance music disc jockey

Billy 'Daniel' Bunter
- Born: Daniel Light; 1975 (age 50–51)
- Genres: Happy hardcore, breakbeat hardcore, hard house
- Occupations: disc jockey, record producer
- Labels: Music Mondays
- Website: www.musicmondays.co.uk/artist/billy-daniel-bunter

Daniel Light (born 1975), known professionally as Billy 'Daniel' Bunter, is a British disc jockey and record producer. A veteran of the hard dance rave scene, Bunter combines the "old skool" and the "new skool".

== Biography ==
Bunter started his DJ career at age 15, playing Belgian hardcore and UK breakbeat hardcore at clubs such as Club Labrynth in Dalston. Called a "pioneer of the rave scene" by DJ Mag, he has been active within the genre since its beginning, and has performed at many UK events such as Helter Skelter, Dreamscape, Slammin Vinyl, and Hardcore Heaven. Bunter also produces and remixes tracks, having sold iro. 1 million records, and has an "ability to blend old and new skool" which has "kept the magic alive and his light burning bright throughout the years".

Bunter released his first mix album, The Future of Hard Dance, Vol. 1, in 1997. The 2000 hard house compilation album, Raising Hell: Hard House Mix, was mixed by both Bunter and Lisa Pin-Up. Featuring artists such as Darude and Tall Paul, a review in the Birmingham Post stated it "strikes at the heart of today's hard house music" and has "uncompromising, hardcore dance".

Bunter released his autobiography, The Love Dove Generation, in 2015. Penned with Andrew Wood, the book is "evocative of the early days of house music". In 2017, Bunter, along with Sanxion, released the album 88 to 94 on the Music Mondays label. Each track on the album is devoted to both a year, in the period 1988 to 1994, and the then contemporary the style of music, such as "Euro Rave" or "Uplifting Hardcore". A review in Mixmag stated it offers "stylistically spot-on kicks from a bygone time".

=== Personal life ===
Bunter is married, to Sonya, and is also good friends with fellow DJ Slipmatt.

== Discography ==
Billy 'Daniel' Bunter singles
Title	Artist	Year	Peak UK singles	Peak UK dance
"Drop That Beat"	Billy Daniel Bunter / Andy Farley	2000		25
"Clap Your Hands"	Billy Bunter / Jon Doe	2001	93	18
"Feel So Good / Mind Games"	Billy Bunter / Jon Doe	2001		31
"Want My Loving / Give Yourself to Me"	Billy Daniel Bunter / Roosta	2004	99	27

== Bibliography ==
- Light, Daniel; Woods, Andrew (2015). The Love Dove Generation. Music Mondays & Straight Six Publishing. ISBN 9780993473203.
