= Amber D =

British dance DJ

- Born: 1982 (age 43–44); Staffordshire, England
- Genres: Hard dance, Hard house, Trance, Hard techno, Hard trance, Tech house
- Occupations: DJ, music producer, radio presenter
- Years active: 2001–present
- Labels: Tidy Trax, Kiddfectious, Riot!, D'Amour Recordings, D-Day Recordings, D'Licious Recordings, Transportal Digital

Amber D (born 1982) is a British hard dance DJ from Staffordshire. She produces and DJs a variety of genres including Hard House, Trance, Hard Techno and Hard Trance. As Amber D'Amour she plays house, electro, fidget, and tech house.

She has been a DJ since late 2001. Her first residency was at the legendary Golden, in Hanley Stoke-on-Trent, where she used to warm up for DJs such as Tiesto, Armin Van Buuren, K-Klass, Mauro Picotto, and she then DJ'd on BPM Radio In 2002, she won a DJ Competition at Fluffy, and started a residency at the club. She has released records with dance labels such as Tidy Trax, Kiddfectious, and Riot!, and has DJ'd internationally, including Europe, Australia, and Ibiza. She did an Essential Mix live on BBC Radio 1 in 2005. She was “Mixmag Future Hero” in 2004, and one of her tracks was in the top 4 at the Hard Dance Awards 2008. She also had the biggest selling EP of all time on Tidy Trax in the shape of the Amber D EP that got released in 2008. In 2006 her track "Attack Warning" on the Tidy Trax label reached number 46 on the UK Independent Singles Chart.

She runs five record labels, D'Amour Recordings (house), D-Day Recordings (Tech, Euro Hard Trance and Hardstyle), D'Licious Recordings (UK hard house & hard dance), Transportal Digital (trance and progressive).

She trained as a classical pianist and has numerous qualifications in Music Production, most recently a BA Hons in Music Production and is studying for her Masters at Leeds Conservatoire. She married Lee Haslam, another DJ, in August 2008, but they since divorced. As of 2021 Amber continues to DJ, including on Twitch, and is also an ambassador for mental health, doing regular livestreams talking and connecting with her fans. She is also a Radio Presenter at 97.8fm LDC Radio (Leeds Dance Community Radio) and her show is every Friday 23:00 - 01:00.
