= Matt Hardwick =

British trance music disc jockey and ex-footballer

- Born: Matthew Hardwick; 12 September 1974 (age 51)
- Origin: Rotherham, England, United Kingdom
- Genres: trance
- Occupations: Lawyer, Disc Jockey, record producer. footballer
- Years active: 2005-2011

Matthew Hardwick (born 12 September 1974) is a former British trance music disc jockey, former record producer and former professional football player who played as a midfielder for Sheffield Wednesday for the 1993-1994 and 1994–1995 seasons. Since then, he went on to be resident DJ at the Gatecrasher nightclub from 1996 to 2004. Hardwick has been featured several times in the DJ Mag top 100 DJ list, last ranked number 68 in 2008, and has performed for the BBC Radio 1 Essential Mix.

Hardwick trained as a solicitor in 2005 having already obtained a master's degree in law from the University of Sheffield in 2002. He has been a partner at international law firm, King & Spalding since 2005.

== Club career ==
Hardwick started as a professional football midfielder, being named in the first team squad for Sheffield Wednesday for the 1993-1994 and 1994–1995 seasons.

== DJ Career ==
Later in 2005 he stated that following moving from the amateur game to professional that "all the fun went out of the game for me". Hardwick started his disc jockey career in c. 1994, performing for a pirate radio station in Sheffield. He "talked his way" into become a DJ at the Gatecrasher nightclub, including playing the first record on the first night. Hardwick was resident at Gatecrasher for 8 years until leaving in 2004 to focus on his development as a DJ.

As well as his live gigs in the UK, Hardwick has built an international reputation for his live performances, and has toured across the Americas, Europe and Asia. He has also played festivals such as Global Gathering, Creamfields, and Escape into the Park. In 2002 Hardwick performed an Essential Mix for the BBC Radio 1 Pete Tong show. This was considered a success and in 2005 he performed a further mix, which was shortlisted for the Essential Mix of the year award.

Hardwick has been voted several times into the DJ Mag poll as one of the world's top 100 DJs. He featured in the top 100 poll every year from 2004 to 2008, with his highest position at number 48 in 2007.

Hardwick has released several dance music compilation mix albums, including Platipus 8 which was released in 2002 to positive critical reception. His 2009 release, Gatecrasher’s Trance Anthems 1993–2009, peaked at #1 in the UK official compilation chart. Hardwick also releases and produces his own music productions, including under the pseudonym the Prophets of Psych.

== Discography ==
Matt Hardwick Albums
| Title | Artist | Year | Peak UK Comp | Peak UK Dance |
|---|---|---|---|---|
| Platipus 8 | Various / Hardwick | 2002 | | |
| Gatecrasher: Resident Transmission | Various / Hardwick | 2002 | | |
| Gatecrasher Immortal | Various / Hardwick | 2007 | 2 | 1 |
| Gatecrasher’s Trance Anthems 1993–2009 | Various / Hardwick | 2009 | 1 | 1 |
