= Vinylgroover =

British hard dance musician

- Born: Scott Attrill; 1976 (age 49–50)
- Genres: Happy hardcore, Hard house
- Occupations: Record producer, DJ
- Website: twistedartists.com/Artist/vinylgroover/

Scott Attrill (born 1976), known professionally as Vinylgroover, is a British happy hardcore and hard house disc jockey and record producer.

== Career ==
Vinylgroover is notable for his impact on the late 1990s happy hardcore music scene. In 1997 and 1998 he released the three volume World of Vinylgroover happy hardcore album series. The second part received a 4* review by Allmusic critic John Bush, who stated it was unlikely to appeal outside fans of the genre, but was "an excellent effort overall". In the 2000s Vinylgroover transitioned his music style to hard house. from 2001 to 2004 he teamed up with Red Hed releasing several tracks which charted in the UK. Their 2002 release "Hell's Drums" peaked at number 30 on the UK Dance chart, and earned a 5* review from Muzik magazine stating it "cuts a wicked groove". Other tracks with Red Hed include techno track "Gobstoppa" and a cover of "Higher State of Consciousness". His collaborations with other artists have also charted, including "Stay" with Rob Tissera which peaked at number 9 on the UK Dance Chart in 2004.

In 2012 Attrill stated hard dance record label Noize. In 2015 a remix of the Vinylgroover and Red Hed track "Live For The Weekend" received a lukewarm 7/10 review from Mixmag.

== Discography ==
Singles
Title	Year	Peak UK Singles	Peak UK Dance	Notes
"Feels like Magic"	1997			Featuring Lenny
"Move your Body"	2000	85	8	
"Rok da House"	2001	72	15	with The Red Hed
"Everlasting"	2002	79	17	with The Red Hed
"Hell's Drums"	2002		30	with The Red Hed
"Kokane"	2003		17	with The Red Hed
"This is How"	2004		28	with The Red Hed
"Intoxicating Rhythm"	2004	87	15	with Anne Savage
"Stay"	2004	61	9	with Rob Tissera
