= Trance Line =

1995 single by Spanish electronic music duo Committee featuring Ithaka

Single by Committee
- Released: 20 December 1994
- Genre: Trance; hard trance; pop
- Length: 5:05 (original mix); 5:10 ('95 Remix); 5:05 (Club Remix '96); 3:27 (Radio edit); 7:48 (TCR Rmx)
- Label: MD Records, King Records
- Songwriters: Dimas Carbajo; J.J. De La Fuente; Ithaka Darin Pappas
- Producers: Dimas Carbajo, J.J. De La Fuente

Music video
- "Trance Line" on YouTube

"Trance Line" is a 1994 hard trance song performed by Spanish electronic music duo, Committee (sometimes spelled Committe) formed by members Dimas Carbajo and J.J. De La Fuente from Madrid. "Trance Line" was the group's second release and originally distributed by MD Records. It was considered an important part of the evolution of trance music in Spain. It was produced by Dimas Carbajo and J.J. De La Fuente and featured lyrics and vocals by Greek-American artist Ithaka (also known as Ithaka Darin Pappas).

== Release ==
"Trance Line" debuted on the Billboard Spanish singles chart at No. 7 on December 24, 1994, peaking at No. 3 on January 7, 1995, and remaining within the top ten until February 1995.

Since its initial appearance on Spanish radio in late 1994, the song has been remixed multiple times, most notably in 2004 by Spanish production team TCR (Fernando Ballesteros, Raul Cremona) released by Trance Corporation Recordings.
