= Lab 4 =

British hard trance musician

Background information
- Origin: Oxford, United Kingdom
- Genres: hard trance; trance; hard dance
- Years active: 1994–present
- Members: Les Elston
- Past members: Adam Newman
- Website: www.lab4.com

Lab 4 is a U.K. based hard trance act formed in 1994 by Adam Newman and Les Elston. The duo are known for their spectacular and raucous live performances.

== History ==
Newman and Elston had previously worked together in the industrial act M.A.D. Shortly after forming, the duo were asked to perform at Club UK, a nightclub that had previously played host to DJs such as Carl Cox and Laurent Garnier. They later played at London fetish club Torture Garden and have since played at the Brixton Academy, Global Gathering 2005 and at Infest in 2006.

Lab 4 released their debut album, Neurocide, in 1999. It received a 4* review in Muzik magazine which called it a "definitive example of the convergence of hard house, acid techno and trance". In 2000 the duo released single "Candyman", from album Evilution also released that year. The track samples the vocals from Carmina Burana and was reviewed by Upfront magazine as an "intense hard trance audio experience". Lab 4 were regularly played on BBC Radio 1 by the late DJ John Peel, who also invited Lab 4 to launch their third album Virus on one of his 'John Peel Sessions' at Maida Vale in 2001.

In September 2006 a statement was posted on the Lab 4 website that Lab 4 would be disbanding by the end of the year. By 2009, the duo had reunited and were working together once more.

In November 2013 a Lab 4 tune, Gilgamesh, featured on the soundtrack for the Sci-Fi movie Time Lapse directed by Bradley King. In 2019 the band split again with Newman departing to work in the AV industry, however Elston continued the Lab 4 act as a solo artist. As of 2020 Lab 4 continue to release singles, such as a well received remix of Concept of Love.

The duo has performed across Great Britain, Europe, Australia, and Japan. Lab 4 have won a number of awards for their live performances including from Mixmag and the UK Hard Dance Awards.

== Discography ==
=== Singles ===
Title	Artist	Release date	Peak chart positions	
Title	Artist	Release date	UK Chart	UK Dance Chart
Unbelievable	Lisa Lashes vs Lab 4	2002	78	14
Requiem/4th Floor	Lab 4	2002	98	13
Candyman	Lab 4	2003	90	13

=== Albums ===
- Neurocide (LP, 1999, Trebleate Recordings)
- Evilution (LP, 2000, One Inch Records)
- Devilution (LP, 2001, Fragile)
- Yoji Biomehanika Presents Lab 4 In the Mix (LP, 2001, Superb Trax)
- Devilution 2 (LP, 2002, Fragile)
- Evilution (LP, 2002, Superb Trax)
- Virus (LP, 2002, Tidy Trax)
- Laboratory 31.03.02 - Experiment 1 (LP, 2003, Fragile) (recorded at Camden Palace)
- Devilution 3 (LP, 2004, Fragile)
- Laboratory 04.04.04 - Experiment 2 (LP, 2004, Fragile) (recorded at Shepherd's Bush Empire)
- None Of Us Are Saints (LP, 2006, Avex Trax)
- The Tidy Magna Live Album (LP, 2009, Tidy Trax) (CD 1 is Lab 4, CD 2 Agnelli & Nelson, CD 3 Rob Tissera)
