= Lee Haslam =

British hard dance disc jockey and record producer

- Born: 1975 or 1976 (age 50–51)
- Origin: Doncaster
- Genres: Hard house, Trance
- Occupations: Record producer, Disc Jockey
- Years active: 1996 -
- Label: Tidy Trax

Lee Haslam (born 1975 or 1976) is a British electronic dance music disc jockey and hard house music producer. He has achieved chart success in the UK, performed a BBC Essential Mix, and is also general manager of the Tidy record label.

== Career ==
Haslam was inspired by Tony De Vit and began his interest in DJing in the 1990s, with his first gig in 1996 in Doncaster. He applied for a job at record label Tidy Trax, and passed the interview by showcasing his DJ skills. Initially doing commercial mixes he moved into club promotions and by the year 2000 had been promoted to label manager. From 2007, until the closure in 2013, he was the director of the Slinky nightclub in Bournemouth. From 2013 Haslam worked for the Gatecrasher brand organising events in Great Britain and worldwide. As of 2021, Haslam is working as general manager of the Tidy label.

Haslam released his debut single, "Here Comes The Pain", in 2002 on the Tidy Trax label. His follow-up single "Music Is The Drug", also released in 2002, received a 4* review in Muzik magazine with journalist Mark Kavanagh stating it had "pounding bass and beats topped with rattling percussion and abrasive synths driving you to the superb, lush breakdown". It peaked at number 14 in the UK Dance chart. In 2005 the Tidy Euphoria compilation album was released. Mixed by Haslam, Amber D, and the Tidy Boys, it reached number 10 in the UK compilation chart. In 2016 Haslam collaborated with Peter Berry to release the single "State of Mind" on the Tidy Two label, which MixMag reviewed as "the energy is outstanding". From 2002 Haslam has been involved in producing and guiding the Resonate - The Brutal Sound of Hard Trance compilation album series.

In 2004 Haslam performed a BBC Radio 1 live Essential Mix from the Tidy Weekender, alongside the Tidy Boys and Judge Jules.

== Discography ==
Lee Haslam singles
Title	Artist	Year	Peak UK Singles	Peak UK Dance
Here Comes The Pain	Lee Haslam	2002	91	22
Music Is The Drug/Your Serve	Lee Haslam	2002	83	14
Free/Retrospective	Lee Haslam	2003	83	15
Liberate/Here Comes The Pain	Lee Haslam	2004	71	9
Music Is The Drug/Guyver Unit	Lee Haslam & Riot Brothers	2005	96	
El Diablo Adentro/Equilibrium	Lee Haslam	2005		15
