= U Found Out =

Single by The Handbaggers
- Released: 1996
- Genre: Eurodance; handbag house
- Length: 3:49
- Label: Tidy Trax
- Songwriters: Amadeus Celery Mozart; Andrew J. Pickles; Vince Clarke
- Producers: Amadeus Celery Mozart; Andrew J. Pickles

Music video
- "U Found Out" on YouTube

"U Found Out" is a song by British girl duo the Handbaggers. Released in 1996 by Tidy Trax as a single, it features a sample from The Jets' 1985 song "Crush on You", and was produced by Tidy Boys. It was also the first release by the label, peaking at number 55 on the UK Singles Chart and number eight on the UK Dance Singles Chart. A music video was also produced to promote the single.

== Critical reception ==
Richard Smith from Melody Maker wrote, "This is that handbag track that samples Depeche Mode's 'Just Can't Get Enough'. It actually works really well. Whenever it comes on in a club, everyone goes "What the..." but then they all start smiling at each other. Which is nice." A reviewer from Music Week gave the song three out of five, noting that the DM riff is adapted for a handbag house track "which has been doing the business in the clubs." In his weekly dance column, James Hamilton mentioned it as a "Shola & Selina chanted nagging romp with its hottest mixes punctuated by the Depeche Mode 'Just Can't Get Enough' riff while all have elements from The Jets' 'Crush on You'." On the re-release of the single in 1997, Music Week gave it four out of five, complimenting its "clever" use of the sample. They also concluded that "thanks to heavy media support", it "should soar into the sales chart."

== Track listing ==
- 12", UK (1995)

A1. "U Found Out" (Tradesmans Mix) – 8:45
AA1. "U Found Out" (Strike Me Down Remix) – 6:39
AA2. "U Found Out" (Handbag Mode Version) – 6:11

- CD single, UK (1996)
1. "U Found Out" (Radio Edit) – 3:49
2. "U Found Out" (Tony De Vit Remix) – 7:37
3. "U Found Out" (Hyperlogic Remix) – 5:58
4. "U Found Out" (Red Hand Gang Remix) – 8:01
5. "U Found Out" (Tom Wilson Remix) – 6:29
6. "U Found Out" (Handbag Mode Mix) – 6:13
- CD maxi, Germany (1996)
1. "U Found Out" (Radio Edit) – 3:49
2. "U Found Out" (Tony De Vit Mix) – 7:37
3. "U Found Out" (Tom Wilson Remix) – 6:30
4. "U Found Out" (Red Hand Gang Mix) – 8:01
5. "U Found Out" (Handbag Mode Mix) – 6:13
6. "U Found Out" (Hyperlogic Mix) – 5:58

== Charts ==
Chart (1996)	Peak position
Scotland (OCC)	30
UK Singles (OCC)	55
UK Dance (OCC)	8
UK Pop Tip Club Chart (Music Week)	14
