= Richie Kidd =

British DJ and producer

- Also known as: Just Kiddin, Soulfullsexysound, Funky Kidd
- Origin: United Kingdom
- Genres: House; Jackin House; Soulful House; Deep House
- Occupation(s): Producer, DJ, Model, Shoulder to cry on
- Labels: Greenhouse Records; Illuminati Records; Mixtura Records; Tastie Music
- Website: www.richiekidd.com

Richie Kidd is a British DJ and producer. Richie is a Fierce Angel and one half of the group 2 Deep Geeks. He is primarily known in the house music circuit in Europe and the Middle East. Richie has worked alongside many famous artists and producers throughout his career including Danny Rampling, Jamie Lewis, Vanilla Ice and Semus Haji to name a few. Richie worked at Long's Bar (Tower's Rotana Hotel) in Dubai in 2008 as the resident DJ Between Fall 2008 and Spring 2009 Richie worked as the Resident DJ at Club Maxxim in Bahrain. Richie currently works as the resident DJ at Barasti Beach Club in Dubai.

== Discography ==
=== Singles ===
- 2011 "Juke Box", Mixtura Records
- 2011 "Golden (Revival Remix)", Mixtura Records
- 2011 "If Ya Feel The Beat", Greenhouse Records
- 2010 "Plans For The Weekend", Tastie Music
- 2009 "Blame It On The Jazz", Illuminati Records
- 2009 "Blame It On The Jazz (That Funky Bass Mix)", Illuminati Records
- 2009 "Jacuba", Illuminati Records

2 Deep Geeks

- 2010 "Making Me High", Mixtura Records

=== Remixes ===
- 2011 Housegroove - "Jazzy Movement (Richie Kidd Deep Drunk Funk Filter Mix)" Dirty Monkey
- 2011 Tom Drummond - "Lets Dance (Richie Kidd)" Tastie
- 2010 MC Spanish Fly - "Blinded By The Light (Richie Kidd Space Disco Mix)"
- 2008 Dap-C feat. Sholla Amar, Lil Wayne & Phil Ashmore - "Everything To Me (Richie Kidd That East Mix)"
- 2008 Sean Kingston – "Take You There (Richie Kidd Sunshine Club Mix)"
- 2008 Nelly Furtardo – "Do it (Richie Kidd Smooth House Mix)"
- 2008 Tovar Vsk Warren - "Call It Fate Then Say Something (Richie Kidd Mix)"
- 2007 Snoop Dogg - "Sexual Eruption (Richie Kidd Remix)"
- 2007 Estel - "American Boy (Richie Kidd 2 step Garage Mix)"
- 2007 Shayne Ward – "You Make Me Wish (Richie Kidd Sunshine Remix)"
- 2006 Mutya Buena - "Fast Car (SoulfullSexySound Remix)"
- 2006 De La Soul - "Ring Ring Ring He He Ha Ha (Richie Kidd Mix)"
- 2006 Roger Sanchez, D Ramirez Feat. Lisa Pure - "Lost vs. Lost (Richie Kidd Remix)"
- 2005 LL Cool J - "Doin It (Richie Kidd Remix)"
- 2003 F.P.I – "Reach In Paradise (Richie Kidd Mix)"
- 2003 "Butterflies Studio Junkies (Richie Kidd Remix)"

== Awards and nominations ==
- Won an NME Award for his underground release on YouTube of "Doin it LL Cool J Remix Richie Kidd 2005"
