= DJ Boston =

Russian DJ (born 1983)

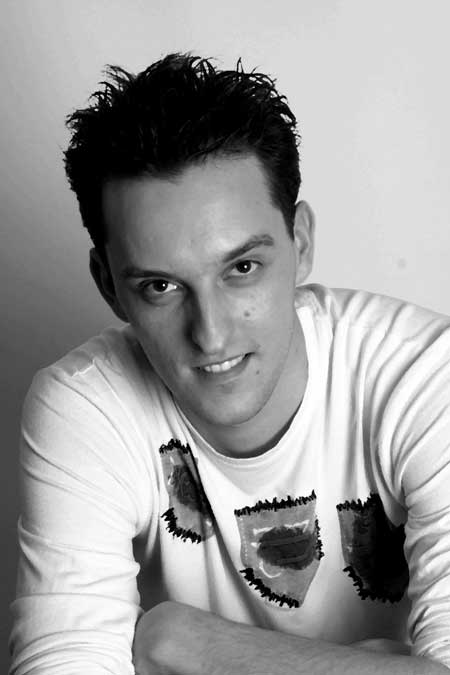

Background information
- Born: Sergei Ledovsky; March 26, 1983 (age 43)
- Origin: Russia
- Genres: Electronic, house
- Occupations: Composer, Electronic music artist
- Years active: 2000-present

DJ Boston (Russian: Диджей Бостон) (real name — Sergei Ledovsky (Russian: Сергей Ледовский), 26 of March 1983, Krasnokamensk, Russia) is a Russian DJ, composer and producer of house music.

== Biography ==
Author of the remix to the popular Russian music composition by the famous author Eugene Krylatov to the Russian movie (using the vocal samples from the original movie), author of the popular remix to the song written by the popular Belarusian rock band (remix released by the Belarusian record company in the CD compilation). Author of the song (track has got to the top-hits of the year 2006 radio).

In the year 2006 Dj Boston has participated in Belarusian-Brazilian project "Viva Brasilia", as the author and composer. The concert tour around the Belarus was organized at the same time.

In 2006 Dj Boston and Ellen Mendonca have recorded and released the CD album «DJ Boston feat. Ellen Mendonca», named in the press as "The first Belarusian-Brazilian album".

In 2012, Dj Boston joined a rap band "Switter Boys" by the name Sergio "BOSTONBOY", as its co-author and composer. The project was established in July 2012, when it was announced that Jennifer Lopez was coming to Minsk . In honor of her arrival to Belarus for the first time, Switter Boys made a video "I love you, Jennifer Lopez!" and posted it on the internet. The band members also have personally met and photographed with the singer at the front entrance of the hotel where she stayed, at the same time performing to her their own version of Jennifer’s song "Goin' In" with an accordion and balalaika. However Jennifer Lopez was especially impressed by the accordion and opera-signing used by the band during the performance as she has personally announced during her Dance Again World Tour Video Conference.

Also in anticipation of the soccer match between "BATE" (Belarus) and "Valencia" (Spain) the band posted on the internet supporting video "BATE Got The Power!". The video made success and got to the prime-time news on the National TV Channel ONT. However some soccer fans and sport journalists saw another message in the song - in particular, the response to the comment of the famous Russian sport commentator Vasily Utkin about Belarusian Soccer Club “BATE” and its coach Viktor Goncharenko.

On October 25, 2012 popular Belarusian group Akute in participation with DJ Boston introduced on the Internet a new single album "Igolki" ", the title track of which was a remix version of their song "Adzіnotstva" made by Dj Boston.

In 2013, Dj Boston releases music video "Speed Rider" with Brazilian singer-songwriter Siberia (port. Sibéria), originally from Belarus. "Speed Rider" is Dj Boston's first work as both a film director and cinematographer. The video includes some shots from Isle of Man TT racing event and got nearly 2 million views on one of the popular Video Sharing Website.

On 8 October 2014 DJ Boston and Siberia together with Sérgio Menezes, Brazilian actor and entertainer from Rio de Janeiro best known for his works in telenovelas Cheias de Charme (2012), Sinhá Moça (2006) and Celebridade (2003) has launched new music video "Believe". Dj Boston and Sergio first met when filming together in Brazilian comedy series "Politicamente Incorreto" in 2014 with Danilo Gentili.

Shortly after the video "Believe" was released in 2014 DJ Boston, Siberia and Sergio Menezes has launched the second music video "Listen Yo" (Party) under the direction of DJ Boston. Featuring as a special guest the fellow Brazilian actor José Dumont, best known for his role as the family father in Behind the Sun (Abril Despedaçado), an award-winning film of director Walter Salles.

== Discography ==
=== Albums ===
- 2002 — J:Mors “Web-Design” (“Time of the year” (DJ Boston adult contemporary melancholic mix)).
- 2004 — J:Mors “Montevideo” (“Silence on the radars” (remix Dj Boston)).
- 2006 — Dj Boston “Dj Boston feat. Ellen Mendonca”.

=== Singles ===
- 2002 — J:Морс – Gray Shadow "Time of the year" (DJ Boston Adult Contemporary Melancholic Mix)
- 2003 — Remake from the original movie theme "Guest from the future" (DJ Boston remake)
- 2004 — J:Moрс - Montevideo "Silence on the radars" (DJ Boston remix)
- 2004 — J:Морс - Albion (DJ Boston Arctic sunshine mix)
- 2004 — J:Морс - 100 roads “Stop! Stop!“(DJ Boston remix)
- 2005 — J:Moрс - My sun (DJ Boston remix)
- 2006 — J:Moрс - Princess (DJ Boston remix)
- 2006 — Dj Boston - Baby
- 2007 — Remake from the original movie theme "Walking the Streets of Moscow" (DJ Boston remake)
- 2009 — J:Moрс - Super Mario (DJ Boston remix)
- 2010 — Remake from the original movie theme "Santa-Barbara" (DJ Boston Remix)
- 2011 — Lynyrd Skynyrd - Sweet Home Alabama (DJ Boston remix)
- 2012 — J:Moрс — Mamonov (DJ Boston remix)
- 2012 — Switter Boys - I love you, Jennifer Lopez!
- 2012 — Switter Boys - "BATE" Got The Power (DJ Boston mix)
- 2012 — Akute - Loneliness (Adzinoztva) (DJ Boston radio edit mix)
- 2013 — Dj Boston & Siberia - Big Boy Happy
- 2013 — Dj Boston & Siberia - Speed Rider
- 2013 — Dj Boston & Siberia - Memories
- 2013 — Dj Boston & Siberia - Home
- 2014 — Dj Boston, Siberia feat.Sérgio Menezes - Believe
- 2014 — Dj Boston, Siberia feat.Sérgio Menezes and José Dumont- Listen Yo (Party)
- 2014 — Dj Boston, Siberia feat.Sérgio Menezes- Tonight (#1)
- 2014 — Dj Boston & Siberia - We got away
- 2014 — Dj Boston, Siberia feat.Sérgio Menezes- Academia

=== Compilations ===
- 2005 — J:Mors “My sun. True story 2000-2005” (“My sun” (remix Dj Boston)).
- 2005 — Compilation «Golden TOP 20's. Winter 2006».

=== Videos ===
- 2012 — Switter Boys - I love you, Jennifer Lopez!
- 2012 — Switter Boys - "Bate" got the power!
- 2013 — Siberia - Speed Rider
- 2013 — Siberia - Home
- 2013 — Siberia - Memories
- 2014 — Siberia feat.Sergio Menezes - Believe
- 2014 — Siberia feat.Sergio Menezes&Jose Dumont - Listen Yo (Party)
- 2015 — Siberia - Tonight ft.Sergio Menezes

== Articles ==
- DJ Boston feat. Ellen Mendonca. Musical newspaper .
- First Belarusian-Brazilian album. “Tuzin Gitou”.
- «Bessame mucho»: kiss me harder! Newspaper Belarus Today.
- Brazilian singer and Belarusian DJ have recorded the CD album.
- Brazilian singer and Belarusian DJ have recorded the CD album. Source:BelaPAN.
- «Bessame mucho»: kiss me harder!
- The singer from Brazil in "Jazz-lunch"
- Belarusian top-chart
- Santa-Barbara (Dj Boston remix)
- Lynyrd Skynyrd - Sweet Home Alabama (Dj Boston remix)
- Brazilian singer and Belarusian DJ recorded a joint album
- Jennifer Lopez: Belarusian Love
- Switter Boys - I love you, Jennifer Lopez!
- "I love you, Jennifer Lopez!" on Belarusian National TV Channel "BT"
- SwitterBoys@Belarusian National TV Channel "BT"
- "БАТЭ GOT THE POWER!
- SWITTER BOYS "BATE GOT THE POWER!
- BATE Body Paint Kick TV
- DJ Boston на JunoDownload
- Jennifer Lopez meets Belarusian musicians
- «Switter Boys» supports BATE with naked chest
- Jennifer Lopez brings to Belarus her boyfriend and 75 people
- Jennifer Lopez in Minsk!
- Akute played in Brazil
- Akute presented a new single album "Igolki"
- Akute played in Brazil
- Akute played in Brazil
- Brazilian-Belarusian single album Akute
