= Tidy Boys =

British hard dance music duo

- Origin: Rotherham, Kettering
- Genre: hard house
- Years active: 1999 -
- Label: Tidy Trax
- Members: Andy Pickles, Amadeus Mozart
- Website: www.tidy.management/artists/the-tidy-boys/

The Tidy Boys are a UK-based hard dance music duo formed of Andy Pickles and Amadeus Mozart. They are known for creating the Tidy Trax record label, and their hard house DJ and production work. Pickles and Mozart are also known as Hyperlogic, the Handbaggers, and Untidy Dubs.

== History ==
The Rotherham-based Andy Pickles and Kettering-based Amadeus Mozart founded the Tidy Trax record label in 1995. Mozart, who changed his name by deed poll in 1986, had previously worked for the Keep Kettering Tidy campaign, which was the inspiration for the name of the label and the group. Pickles was previously the guiding influence behind the Jive Bunny and the Mastermixers series.

The first release for the label was the track "U Found Out" by the Handbaggers, an alternate moniker for Pickles and Mozart, which reached #55 in the UK singles chart in 1996. They also produced tracks under the Hyperlogic name, with the "Only Me" single being the first to achieve UK chart success, reaching number 35 in the UK singles chart in 1995 on the Systematic label. It was later re-released on Tidy Trax, this time peaking at #48 in 1998. Some time later in March 1999 the duo came together under the Tidy Boys name, and played their first DJ set together. The Tidy Boys went on to perform at live events such as the Tidy Weekender, Escape into the Park, and Creamfields, and held a monthly residency at Sundissential.

The Tidy Boys have released a number of hard house compilation mix albums, some of which have achieved chart success, such as Hard House Euphoria mixed with Lisa Pin-Up which peaked at #12 in the UK Compilation Chart in 2001. They have performed three BBC Radio 1 Essential Mix sessions, the first in 2004 alongside Judge Jules and Lee Haslam, the second in October 2005 performing with Amber D live from the Tidy Weekender, and the third in 2006 with Marcel Woods. They were featured again on BBC Radio 1 in 2010, performing on the Kutski show. The duo has received attention from the music press, with DMC World calling the Tidy Boys "iconic", and their sound being described as blending "rave with nu-NRG and trance".

== Discography ==
Tidy Boys compilations
Title	Artist	Year	Peak UK Comp
The Tidy Boys Annual	Tidy Boys / Various	2001	27
Hard House Euphoria	Tidy Boys vs Lisa Pin-Up / Various	2001	12
Tidy Euphoria	Lee Haslam / Tidy Boys / Amber D / Various	2005	10
The Tidy Boys Big Night Out	Tidy Boys / Various	2006	94
