= Marcel Woods =

Dutch trance musician

- Born: Marcel Scheffers
- Origin: Eindhoven
- Genre: Trance
- Occupations: Record producer, DJ
- Years active: 1988-2014
- Label: ID&T
- Website: www.marcelwoods.com

Marcel Scheffers, known professionally as Marcel Woods, is a Dutch trance music musician and disc jockey. Part of the cohort known as the "golden generation" of Dutch DJs, he produced several popular tracks. Woods was mainly active between 1988 and 2014.

== Career ==
Woods is from Eindhoven, Holland. He began his DJ career in 1988, and started rising to prominence in the late 1990s as a trance music producer. He belongs to the "golden generation" group of Dutch DJs, and saw both local and international success. Woods worked with dance label ID&T and later it's successor High Contrast Recordings.

In 2005 Woods released one of his most well known singles, "Advanced". A trance track called "far from a shrinking violet" by Mixmag, it peaked at number 52 on the Dutch Charts and was remixed by DJ Tiesto sometime later in 2012. In 2006 his single "Monotone", which was named by Judge Jules as one his favourite tracks, peaked at number 57 on the Dutch Charts. Also in 2006 he performed an Essential Mix with the Tidy Boys for BBC Radio 1.

Woods has appeared in the DJ Mag world top 100 DJs poll on four occasions. His highest placing was in 2010 at number 63. In 2012 a remix of his 2009 track "I Can't Sleep" received an 8* review from Mixmag. As of 2014, Woods has announced his retirement from DJ work.

== Discography ==
Singles
Title	Year	Peak BEL	Peak NLD	Billboard Club	Notes
"De Bom 2001"	2001				
"Once Upon A Time In The West"	2002	45			with DJ Gert
"Time's Running Out"	2003				
"Advanced"	2005		52		
"Cherry Blossom"	2005				
"Monotone"	2006		57		
"I Can't Sleep (Manufactured Superstars remix)"	2009				feat. Elles de Graaf
"Don't Ditch"	2011			9	with Tiesto
