= Rob Tissera =

British hard house disc jockey and record producer

- Born: 1966 (age 59–60)
- Origin: Milton Keynes
- Genres: Hard trance, hard house
- Occupations: Record producer, Disc Jockey
- Years active: 1989 -
- Labels: Tidy Trax, XL Recordings, Nukleuz
- Website: www.robtissera.co.uk

Rob Tissera (born 1966) is a British hard house disc jockey and record producer. His releases have achieved UK chart success over a c. 10 year period from 1996, and he is known for his live performances and club nights.

== Biography ==
Tissera has achieved chart success under his own name, and with Ian Bland as Quake. He has also released tracks under the name of Circle City, through the Warp record label.

In 1990 he was arrested and ultimately given a 3-month custodial sentence for inciting a riot: while DJing at Love Decade, an unlicensed rave in a Leeds warehouse, he became aware that the police had surrounded the venue and announced on the PA that the audience would have to fight the police to keep the party going. A violent scene followed and it was the largest mass arrest in British history, with 836 people arrested in total. Tissera regretted the act, though his notoriety for defending the rave scene helped him further his DJ career.

Tissera is known for his live performances at events such as Global Gathering, Creamfields and Homelands, and for promoting the Leeds-based Kissdafunk club night. His music has been played by a range of well-known DJs, including Pete Tong, Carl Cox, and Judge Jules. In 2012 Tissera made it into the Mixmag list of top badly behaved DJs, after getting into trouble with the authorities for inciting the Kissdafunk crowd to resist the police.

Tissera has released several DJ mix albums, some of which have achieved chart success, including GoodGreef Album 2 and Kissdafunk that reached #77 and #56 in the UK official compilations chart in 2004 and 2007 respectively. In 2004 he was also invited to perform a two-hour Essential Mix for the BBC Radio 1 Pete Tong show.

The music press has provided commentary on Tissera and his work. Resident Advisor have called him one of "dance music's most prolific stars", while Mark Kavanagh of Muzik magazine called him the "party animal from Hell" in 2002 but qualified that his music had been "huge all summer". Noel Gardner of the Quietus was more circumspect, calling Tissera a "hard trance dork" following his change to a harder style.

== Discography ==
Rob Tissera releases
Title	Artist	Year	Peak UK Singles	Peak UK Dance
Kick Up The Volume	Rob Tissera	1996	84	5
The Day Will Come	Quake feat. Marcia Rae	1998	53	3
Mantra	Quake	1999		16
Burning (Can I hold you?)	Rob Tissera	2002	84	18
Bring The Lights Down	Rob Tissera & Nathan D'Amour	2004		33
Stay	Rob Tissera/Vinylgroover/Red	2004	61	9
The Revolution/Bitch	Rob Tissera/Dark By Design	2004	99	
Feel The Drums	Rob Tissera & Guyver	2005	81	24

== Bibliography ==
- Tissera, Rob (2023). The Smiler, A DJ's Life. Music Mondays & Straight Six Publishing. ISBN 9780993473289.
