= Tidy Trax =

British hard house record label

- Founded: 1995; 31 years ago
- Founder: Andy Pickles and Amadeus Mozart (aka The Tidy Boys)
- Genre: Hard House • Trance
- Country of origin: England
- Location: Leeds
- Official website: www.tidytrax.co.uk

Tidy Trax, currently known as Tidy, is a record label based in the United Kingdom. Founded in 1995 by Andy Pickles and Amadeus Mozart, Tidy is known for promoting a style of hard house that is both fun and high tempo. It has featured a roster of hard house and trance artists, and hosts regular live events including the Tidy Weekender. Since 2005 the Tidy label also includes Tidy Two and Untidy.

== History ==
The Tidy Trax label was founded in 1995 by Rotherham-based Andy Pickles and Amadeus Mozart, who are also jointly known as DJ producers the Tidy Boys. Pickles had previously worked on the Jive Bunny series of records, the financial success of which supported the foundation of the Tidy Trax label. The label was at the forefront of the UK hard house and trance scenes in the 1990s and early 2000s, both running live events and releasing over 350 records. Tidy Trax was reported to have sold over a million records in one year. From 2005 the popularity of the Tidy sound did wane, however the label had maintained a core underground fanbase and in the 2020s a resurgence in popularity has been reported.

Artists that have been featured by the label include Andy Farley, Tony De Vit, Steve Blake, Lee Haslam, the Tidy Boys, Rob Tissera, Eats Everything, Charlotte de Witte, Hannah Laing, and Josh Butler. Other artists included the Tidy Girls, a collaboration between Lisa Lashes, Anne Savage, Rachel Auburn, and Lisa Pin-Up. The Tidy Girls eponymous release achieved success in the UK official singles chart. The cover CD of the February 2003 issue of Mixmag featured a "Tidy vs Frantic" mix between DJs Paul Maddox and Tom Harding.

In 2005 Tidy Trax merged with its sister labels, Tidy Two and Untidy Trax, to form a single label called Tidy. Also in 2005, the Ministry of Sound released a Euphoria compilation focused on the Tidy sound, which peaked at number 10 in the UK official compilation chart. An album, featuring various artists, celebrating 20 years of the Tidy label peaked at number 11 in the UK official dance album chart in 2015.

In 2021 Tidy celebrated its 25-year anniversary with its 18th live event held at the Pontins holiday park in Prestatyn. In 2023 Tidy published a photobook, "The Cult of Tidy Volume One: 1995-2005", detailing the history of the label up to 2005. The label is often credited by the dance music press of being a major innovator in the dance music scene, with its promotion of "fun" events and c. 135 BPM beats.

=== Tony De Vit ===
The Tidy Trax label regularly released the music of British DJ Tony De Vit, who is often credited as the "godfather of UK hard house". De Vit died in 1998, shortly after "the Dawn" was released by Tidy Trax, as a result of his contracting HIV. To commemorate the 25th anniversary of the death of De Vit, in 2023 Tidy Trax released a compilation of remixes of De Vit's tunes, "TDV25 - The Remixes", by artists including Eats Everything, Nicole Moudaber, and Hannah Laing.

=== Live events and the Tidy Weekender ===
The Tidy Weekender is a regular live event organised and hosted by the Tidy label that has a roster of dance music performances, and has featured acts such as Judge Jules, Rob Tissera, Anne Savage and Fergie. The first event was held over a 3-day period in 2002, at the Pontins park in Prestatyn, which was also the venue for the 25th anniversary event in 2021. The 20th anniversary of the Tidy label occurred in 2015 and was celebrated at a Tidy Weekender in Southport. In 2023 Pontins closed down the holiday park in Prestatyn, which had a significant impact on the Tidy "wet and wild weekender" which was to be held there. Other live events promoted by the label include the "Cult of Tidy" tour.

==== Weekender Events ====
#	Event	Date	City	Venue	Headliners	Ref.
1	Tidy 30	25-27th April 2025	Great Yarmouth, Norfolk	Vauxhall Holiday Park		

== Selected discography ==
Tidy Trax singles releases
Title	Artist	Year	Peak UK Singles	Peak UK Dance
U Found Out	The Handbaggers	1996	55	8
Higher/You'll Know	Trauma	1998	96	5
Expression	Steve Blake	1999		32
Tidy Girls EP	Tidy Girls	1999	96	31
Coming on Strong	Signum ft Scott Mac	1999	66	5
The Dawn	Tony De Vit	2000	56	3
Unbelievable	Lisa Lashes	2000	63	18
Deep Swarm	Trauma vs Ian M	2000		12
Let's Rock	E-Trax	2001	60	20
Busted & Backwards Bitch	Guvnors	2001	80	12
I Don't Care	Tony De Vit	2002	65	2
What Ya Got 4 Me	Signum	2002	35	3
Unbelievable	Lisa Lashes vs Lab 4	2002	78	14
What Can You Do 4 Me	Lisa Lashes	2003	52	5
Synthosauraus	Paul Maddox ft. Niki Mak	2003	86	20
Intoxicating Rhythm	Anne Savage/Vinylgroover	2004	87	15
Mastermind	Enermatic	2004	100	23
Liberate/Here Comes The Pain	Lee Haslam	2004	71	9

Tidy Trax & Tidy album releases
Title	Artist	Year	Peak UK Comp	Peak UK Dance
Keep It Tidy 1995-1998	Various	1998	66	
Keep It Tidy - Vol 2	Various	2000	36	
The Tidy Boys Annual	Various	2001	27	
The Tidy Girls Annual	Various	2001	24	
Keep It Tidy 4 2002-2004	Various	2004	56	
Resonate 4	Various	2004	67	
Tidy Weekender 12 - Live	Various	2007	75	32
Hard Dance Awards - The Album 2007	Various	2007	93	23
Tidy XX - Celebrating 20 Years Of Tidy	Various	2015	77	11
TDV25 - The Remixes	Tony De Vit / Various	2023		

== See also ==
- Category:Tidy Trax artists
- Nukleuz
- List of electronic music record labels
