= Escape into the Park =

Annual festival in Swansea, Wales

- Genre: Music
- Locations: Swansea, Wales, U.K.
- Inaugurated: July 8, 1995

Escape into the Park is an annual festival held in Singleton Park, Swansea, South Wales, that began in July 1995. It started life as a spin-off to The Escape club formerly located in Northampton Lane, Swansea (later known as Club Cuba) and played host to many artists and dance DJs, and focusing on a dance and rave theme.

From launch it was run by the club Escape, until 2005 when large clubbing group Godskitchen took over the reins. It took a "rest break" in 2012, returning in 2021.
