= Hard trance =

Subgenre of trance music

- Stylistic origins: Trance; hard house; acid trance; new beat; breakbeat hardcore
- Cultural origins: Early 1990s, Belgium, Germany, Netherlands
- Derivative forms: hardstyle; psychedelic trance; tech trance; uplifting trance; happy hardcore; mainstream hardcore

Hard trance is a subgenre of trance music that originated in Belgium, Germany and the Netherlands in the early 1990s as the Breakbeat hardcore production community began to diversify into new and different styles of electronic music, all influenced by hard house, new beat, happy hardcore and jungle music. The popularity of hard trance peaked during the late 1990s and has since faded in favor of newer forms of trance.

Hard trance is often characterized by strong, hard (or even downpitch) kicks, fully resonant basses and an increased amount of reverberation applied to the main beat. Melodies vary from 140 to 180 BPM and it can feature plain instrumental sound in early compositions, with the latter ones tending to implement side-chaining techniques from progressive trance on digital synthesizers.

Hard trance was the final form of progressive trance to hit the mainstream. It eventually morphed into hardstyle, jumpstyle and gabber. Its mainstream popularity decreased in the mid-2000s.

== History ==
Cosmic Gate – Human Beings (2003, excerpt)
An excerpt from Cosmic Gate's "Human Beings" from 2003 demonstrates the prominence of hard trance at the time: a full-resonance uncut bass is accompanied by hard kicks, open hats and a fair amount of reverberation.

The hard trance sound developed out of the breakbeat hardcore/hardcore era which itself developed from Belgian New Beat industrial style of Techno. When the hardcore breakbeat production community split into its separate subgenres, hard trance began to develop within the breakbeat hardcore production community. Hard trance went on to become one of the dominant and most successful electronic music styles throughout the 1990s in mainland Europe and around the world. The British electronic music scene split off into other styles such as jungle/drum and bass, hardcore, techno and house.

=== Popularity, commercialisation and commercial downfall ===
Remaining popular around 1993–1997 in mainland Europe, hard trance was associated with mega-raves of many thousands of ravers. Many series of compilation CDs came initially from the originators of the sound and the clubs that promoted it. It ultimately went overground and reached commercial status becoming known commercially as "maximaal".

Throughout the 1990s the popularity of the sound caused a flurry of popular and financially successful tracks to be licensed by major record labels, with the sound becoming aggressively marketed through commercial compilations on TV, radio and across the different forms of media. In Belgium hard trance was popular in the 1990s, with the label Bonzai Records and titles such as The First Rebirth by Jones & Stephenson released in 1993, Rave City by Yves Deruyter released in 1993, Let There Be House by Cherrymoon Trax released in 1994, The Wave by The Belgica Wave Party released in 1993, Belgium Jump by Dream Your Dream released in 1993, Back To Reality by Phrenetic System released in 1994.

==== United Kingdom ====
The hard trance sound came to the UK via the underground techno community in clubs such as Heaven, Trade, Melt and FF and Fist or through clubs such as The Orbit in Morley and Club UK in London. It never reached the same commercial heights or as on the continental mainland due to British music scene already being widely diversified into styles such as jungle/drum & bass, hardcore and house. However it is frequently played in the free party scene and many clubs and festivals still play it to this day. Music magazine Mixmag has cited the Resonate album series as representative of the UK hard trance scene from 2002 to 2006.

==== New Zealand ====
New Zealand was late to the party and enjoyed Hard Trance into the mid-2000s. The majority of clubs were centred in the K road region of Auckland and included Kiss, Bed, Stair Case and Jones Bar. Auckland's scene was well supplied and transitioned to drum and bass, breaks and eventually dubstep in the late 2000s.

=== Influence on other musical styles ===
==== Netherlands ====
Alongside the birth of hard trance, the same producers and record labels were already producing and developing the jumpstyle sound, the successor of gabber, which was popular in the Netherlands. Jumpstyle used the same sounds as the hard trance sound with faster beat patterns but slightly slower than gabber, this developed directly into hardstyle toward the end of the 1990s, which along hardtechno and hard house came to dominate the harder spectrum of electronic music.

==== United Kingdom ====
The sound influenced and led to the development of UK hard house and its subgenres, prior to this style the UK clubs where hard house developed were typically already playing a mixture of harder techno styles, progressive trance, electro and hardstyle incorporating many sounds and influences from each style can be heard across the others.

==== Spain ====
Jointly with happy hardcore it evolved into makina. In late 1994, the electronic music group Committee (formed by Madrid producers Dimas Carbajo and J.J. De La Fuente) released the song Trance Line that featured lyrics and vocals by Greek-American artist Ithaka (also known as Ithaka Darin Pappas). The song peaked at the #3 position on the Billboard (magazine) Spanish singles charts on January 7th 1995.

== See also ==
- Bonzai Records
