= UK hard house =

Music genre

Hard house
- Other names: UK hard house
- Stylistic origins: House; hardbag; hi-NRG; acid house; hardcore; breakbeat hardcore; new beat
- Cultural origins: Early 1990s, United Kingdom
- Derivative forms: Hardbass

Subgenres
- Hard NRG; pumping house; scouse house

Other topics
- Progressive house; hardstyle; breakbeat; happy hardcore; psychedelic trance

UK hard house or simply hard house is a style of electronic dance music that emerged in the early 1990s and is synonymous with its association to the Trade club and the associated DJs there that created the style. It often features a speedy tempo (around 150 BPM but hard house ranges from around 135 BPM to around 165 BPM), offbeat bass stabs, hoovers and horns. It usually contains a break in the middle of the track where no drums are present. UK hard house often uses a long and sharp string note to create suspense. Most of the time, the drops are introduced by a drum roll.

== Origins ==
Hard house has its immediate roots primarily in Belgian and German techno, American disco-sample based house music, handbag house and early trance.

UK producer and label owner John Truelove was quoted as saying of hard house's origins: "I would say that tunes such as XVX's "Tremorra Del Terra" and Interactive's "Amok" (essentially the same tune) were absolutely defining moments. Early German trance led directly to what Daz Saund and Trevor Rockcliffe were playing at Trade."

Tony De Vit was one of the key DJs to codify and popularise the hard house sound (earlier often referred to as 'hardbag'), taking inspiration from his early visits to Trade in the early '90s — where he soon became a resident DJ. De Vit is often cited as the "godfather of UK hard house".

== Hard house clubbing brands ==
Certain brands have reached legendary status with die-hard hard house fans, such as Birmingham based Sundissential and the record label Tidy Trax who also branched out in the early 2000s into putting on club events, including the Tidy Weekender 3 day events. Clubbers are known to travel cross-country to some parties. The venues associated with certain brands are almost the stuff of legend themselves and are remembered fondly and given almost cult status by veteran ravers. For example:

=== Tidy Brand ===
The Tidy brand began in 1995, when Amadeus Mozart and Andy Pickles formed the record label known as Tidy Trax, with its first release, the Handbaggers' "U Found Out", sampling Minnesota R&B group the Jets 1986 release "Crush on You", which peaked at number 55 on the UK Singles Chart. Pickles previously performed as Jive Bunny and the Mastermixers group between 1986 and 2002. Releasing music under the pseudonyms the Handbaggers and Hyperlogic, Amadeus Mozart and Andy Pickles did not officially use the name the Tidy Boys until 1999.

Between 1999 and 2006 The Tidy Boys were regular performers at festivals, music venues and night clubs around the UK and across the rest of the world playing locations such as Australia, New York, Las Vegas, Tokyo, South Africa, Ibiza, New Zealand, Hong Kong, Norway & Finland. In 2005/6 the Tidy Boys headlined key festivals such as Creamfields, Godskitchen Global Gathering, Escape Into The Park, Planet Love Festival and Dance Valley.

The Tidy Trax label, based in Leeds, was at the forefront of the hard house scene, specifically the years 1998 to 2005. The brand struggled in the late 2000s to keep going financially with dwindling sales (through its Tidy record label) and poor attendance figures to events. During the mid-2010s, however, the brand has had a huge resurgence and revitalized the UK hard house scene putting on huge events across the UK has been possible due to the fans being able to reconnect with the brand through the Tidy Boys official Facebook page and growing social media presence.

Tidy is known for its sell-out club nights and one-off events such as TDV20 – a 20-year memorial event of the death of Tony De Vit – one of the original pioneers of hard house. It is also known for hosting the Tidy Weekender; three-day party events which were held from Friday to Sunday at Pontins resorts in Prestatyn, Camber Sands, and Southport.

=== Storm ===
Launched in 2000, Storm regularly attracted up to 2000 clubbers in its heyday, and people came from as far as Bournemouth, Edinburgh and Belfast. The remoteness of Coalville made the venue tricky to get to, as there were no buses there which run on a Sunday and no local train station, meaning that the majority of clubbers who made it to Storm each week were usually die-hard ravers and for this reason, the brand and the venue had a cult following and very quickly reached legendary status amongst hard house fans.

=== Sundissential and Sundissential North ===
Originally held at Pulse in Birmingham, the sheer popularity of the weekly Midlands-based, self-styled "Most Outrageous Club in the World" saw it quickly set up its second base in Leeds – firstly, at Club Uropa from 1998 till 2000 and then Evolution from 2000 till 2005. Known for its cult following by fans who would wear elaborate and often home-made outfits, largely made from red and yellow fluff. Several controversial and tragic incidents kept Sundissential firmly at the forefront of the hard house scene, with several deaths of clubbers, as well as the antics of the promoter Paul Madden, a.k.a. "Madders", which created gossip amongst fans online on Leeds based clubbing forums, biscuitmonsters.com and 4clubbers.net and kept the brand firmly in the spotlight until the doors closed in 2005. In 2016, the brand was relaunched under new management and began putting on events again in Leeds, at the Mint Club and at Church.

=== Frantic ===
One of London's most popular and frequent hard house nights, Frantic was launched in 1997 by then-history teacher Will Paterson, who wanted to create a night based purely on the harder sounds that formed part of the night at clubs like Sunnyside Up and The Garage at Heaven. “I started Frantic as I wanted to go to a night for clubbers like me that preferred the ferocious hoover led sounds of Tony De Vit rather than the softer hardbag sounds" he said in a 2005 article. "I didn’t see why the night couldn’t be tough from the beginning and knew loads of clubbers who felt the same. I got into hard house by accident.” Frantic would go on to host hundreds of events, including regular sold-out shows at the 4500-capacity Brixton Academy.

=== Fish! and Superfish! ===
From the mid-1990s to early 2000s, club nights included Fish!, Superfish!, and Warriors at Turnmills. Hard house and hard NRG artists and DJs at these venues included Captain Tinrib, D.F.Q., Ben Javlin, Steve Thomas, Steve Hill, Rubec, Simon Eve, Pete Wardman, Dave Randall, Johnnie "RR" Fierce, Karim, Chris "Drum Head" Edwards, and Weirdo. Other venues were the Soundshaft nightclub (next to Heaven in Charing Cross) and The Fridge in Brixton.

=== Sin:ergy ===
Manchester's longest-running hard house club night, launched in October 2000 and ran every Friday at The Phoenix until 2003. In 2003 Sin:ergy moved to a monthly event at club North (under Afflecks Place). With the tag line was... "All Nations, All Persuasions" Sin:ergy and welcomed anyone and everyone, it was a place all about the music no matter what the colour of your skin or sexual orientation. Sin:ergy welcomed artists such as; Tidy Boys, Karim, RR Fierce, Sterling Moss, Ilogik, Lab 4 and many more and featured Paul Glazby and Ian M as resident DJs. Originally founded by Jeremy Couzins and joined by Stuart Moir in late 2000. In 2003 Stuart founded spinoff night PureFilth! and Sinergy was later sold to Lord K who still owns the brand.

=== PureFilth ===
PureFilth was a hard dance club based in Manchester for clubbers who liked their music extra hard, the club was set up and run by Stuart Moir (an original Sin:ergy promoter). PureFilth started as a monthly Thursday night Club Phoenix and quickly progressed to a monthly Saturday which moved to The Park Nightclub, Manchester and a monthly student night (Thursday) at Scubar, Manchester. PureFilth was the only night club in the north and one of the first in the UK that solely concentrated on the harder side of house, in its day PureFilth had a hardcore following putting on events packed with DJs with the 1st birthday being a highlight of many people clubbing history... 14 hours, 2 venues and 20 artists including; Captain Tinrib LIVE, Paul Glazby, Energy UK DJs, Ben Stevens, Nik Denton, JP & Jukesy, Tim Clewz and many more.

=== Resurrection ===
Resurrection is a hard house night that started in Manchester promoted by the same people behind the club nights Sin:ergy and PureFilth! Launched in May 2019, Resurrection 1 had a lineup featuring Rob Tissera, Ilogik, Dynamic Intervention, JP & Jukesy, Tim Clewz, Casper, Little Miss Natalie, Frank Farrell and resident DJs. In December 2019 was Resurrection 2, featuring Lab 4 LIVE, Defective Audio, Eufex, Jon Hemming, Joe Longbottom, Bass Jumper, Jodie Rose and many more.

== Subgenres and derivatives ==
=== Donk ===
Scouse house
- Stylistic origins: House; hardbag; Hi-NRG; acid house; trance; bouncy techno; hardcore; breakbeat hardcore; Happy hardcore
- Cultural origins: Late 1990s to early 2000
- Typical instruments: Synthesizer; drum machine; sequencer; sampler; keyboard

Donk, also known as Bounce or Hard Bounce, is a style of UK Hard House "featuring an upbeat, energetic sound and a heavy focus on the 'pipe' sample as an offbeat bassline". There is debate about Donk's origin, but the sounds are thought to have come from the Netherlands in the 1990s. The name itself is a neologism, derived from the scene in the UK. In the UK, the style originated in North West England, around towns and cities such as Wigan, Liverpool, Bolton, Blackburn, and Burnley, and was first known as Scouse House or Bounce - as it spread out of the area and became more mainstream, it became known as Donk. "Donk" was the name given to the "particularly rubbery, rebounding thwack" sound that predominated Donk tracks and became "the umbrella term for the genres that feature it". In other parts of Europe, the versions of Donk are known as bumping and poky (Spain); in Russia, as Hardbass. Critic Simon Reynolds drew comparisons between the donk scene and contemporaneous regional American hip hop styles, including bounce, crunk, hyphy, snap, and juke. Describing donk as a "distant cousin" to these American sounds, Reynolds noted that they shared characteristics such as anonymous rapping, humorously boastful or sexist lyrics, "bling videos", and a highly localised focus offset by occasional nationwide hits, comparing the UK's The Blackout Crew to the U.S. group Cold Flamez.

=== Pumping house ===
Pumping house (or bumping) is an intermediate term and a local variant of the early scouse house scene, which was popular in Russia and Spain in the late 1990s to early 2000s. The genre can be traced back to the Dutch duo Klubbheads, who invented so called bamboo-bass in the track Ultimate Seduction - "A Walking Nightmare (Klubbheads GP Mix)" in 1997. Years later the genre gave birth to Britain's donk scene and Spain scene poky. Pumping house is used as an interchangeable term for scouse house in Russia, Spain and Poland.

=== Hardbass ===
Hardbass (Russian: хардбасс) is a development of pumping house, that originated in Russia in the early 2000s.

=== Hard NRG ===
Hard NRG is a genre that emerged from trance and UK hard house that gained popularity on the rave scenes. The genre is distinguished by the offbeat bass patterns that were inspired from Hi-NRG, which were added over darker and more anthemic trance beats and synths. Though lacking the trance melodies it has more of a rhythmic structure.

== Confusion ==
Hard house is similar to, but distinct from hardstyle. Confusion can sometimes arise as some club nights and events will play both hardstyle and hard house. This may be because hardstyle is quite well known across western Europe, whereas hard house has only ever had a limited audience outside of the UK, Australia and South Africa, so there is more new music being released in the hardstyle scene..
