= Fergie (DJ) discography =

Fergie discography
- Studio albums: 1
- EPs: 7
- Singles: 37
- DJ mixes: 6

The discography of the Northern Irish DJ and electronic music artist Fergie consists of 1 studio album, 11 DJ mixes, 7 extended plays, 37 singles and 32 remixes. He has recorded 13 Essential Mixes which were broadcast on BBC Radio 1. His DJ mixes have been released by record labels such as Sony Music, Ministry of Sound and Virgin Records. 2 of his DJ mixes have been released as covermount CDs for Mixmag magazine. In the studio, in addition to his solo work, he has collaborated on original tracks with artists including Mauro Picotto, BK, Agnelli & Nelson and Alan Fitzpatrick. He has remixed a diverse range of artists and groups including Pet Shop Boys, Tears for Fears, Unkle, Slam, Umek, Joseph Capriati.

== Albums ==
=== Studio albums ===
List of studio albums by Fergie
Album title	Album details
Dynamite and Laserbeams	Released: 25 October 2010; Label: Excentric Muzik (EXMALB001); Formats: CD, 4 x 12" singles, digital download

=== DJ mixes compilations ===
==== Released commercially ====
List of DJ mix compilations by Fergie released commercially
Compilation title	Compilation details
Nukleuz Presents HardHouse Anthems Mixed by BK & Fergie (Fergie: CD1)	Released: 6 March 2000; Label: Virgin (VTDCDX 293); Formats: CD
7 Live #3: Fergie	Released: 18 September 2000; Label: DMC (SEVENCD003); Formats: CD
Hard Energy Mixed by Fergie and Yomanda (Fergie: CD1)	Released: 19 February 2001; Label: Ministry of Sound (MOSCD14); Formats: CD, cassette
Headliners: 03 Fergie	Released: 14 October 2001; Label: Ministry of Sound (MOSCD15); Formats: CD
Godskitchen Summer Trance (Fergie: CD3)	Released: 2002; Formats: CD
Mixmag Live: Fergie	Released: 6 September 2004; Label: DMC (MMLCD32); Formats: CD
Rhythm Distrikt 02	Released: 27 September 2012; Label: Toolroom Records; Formats: Digital download

==== Released as magazine covermounts ====
List of DJ mix compilations by Fergie released as magazine covermounts
Compilation title	Compilation details
Trade Hotmix '99 Compiled and mixed by Fergie and Guy Williams (Fergie: tracks 7 to 12)	Released: October 1999; Label: M8 magazine; Formats: CD
Let There Be Hard House	Released: March 2000; Label: Mixmag; Formats: CD
Fergie's Funky Techno Mix	Released: July 2003; Label: Mixmag; Formats: CD
DJ International Allstars: Fergie	Released: 9 July 2004; Label: DJ magazine; Formats: CD

== Extended plays ==
List of extended plays by Fergie
Extended play title	Track title (original tracks only)	Extended play details	Peak chart positions
Extended play title	Track title (original tracks only)	Extended play details	UK
The Bass EP	"Bass Generator"	Released: July 2002; Label: Duty Free Recordings (DFTEL004); Formats: CD, EP, digital download	47
The Bass EP	"Bass Has Got Me On"	Released: July 2002; Label: Duty Free Recordings (DFTEL004); Formats: CD, EP, digital download	47
Ken the Men (Excentric EP: Volume 1)	"Ken the Men – Part 1"	Released: April 2006; Label: Punch Funk Records (PF 003); Formats: EP, digital download	–
Ken the Men (Excentric EP: Volume 1)	"Ken the Men – Part 2"	Released: April 2006; Label: Punch Funk Records (PF 003); Formats: EP, digital download	–
Black Shines Through the Black... EP	"Shifty"	Released: October 2007; Label: Craft Music (Craft 026); Formats: EP, digital download	–
Black Shines Through the Black... EP	"Snapper"	Released: October 2007; Label: Craft Music (Craft 026); Formats: EP, digital download	–
Black Shines Through the Black... EP	"Up & Over"	Released: October 2007; Label: Craft Music (Craft 026); Formats: EP, digital download	–
For the Wee Small Hours	"By the By"	Released: June 2008; Label: Excentric Muzik (EXM006); Formats: EP, digital download	–
For the Wee Small Hours	"Question Mark"	Released: June 2008; Label: Excentric Muzik (EXM006); Formats: EP, digital download	–
For the Wee Small Hours	"To the Core" (digital only)	Released: June 2008; Label: Excentric Muzik (EXM006); Formats: EP, digital download	–
The Me EP	"Anon"	Released: February 2008; Label: Excentric Muzik (EXM004); Formats: EP, digital download	–
The Me EP	"Senderon"	Released: February 2008; Label: Excentric Muzik (EXM004); Formats: EP, digital download	–
The Me EP	"Senderoff"	Released: February 2008; Label: Excentric Muzik (EXM004); Formats: EP, digital download	–
Exit EP	"Exit People"	Released: June 2009; Label: 1605 Music Therapy (1605-007); Formats: EP, digital download	–
Exit EP	"Mantra"	Released: June 2009; Label: 1605 Music Therapy (1605-007); Formats: EP, digital download	–
Exit EP	"Alive"	Released: June 2009; Label: 1605 Music Therapy (1605-007); Formats: EP, digital download	–
Brave Star EP	"Brave Star"	Released: October 2012; Label: Excentric Muzik (EXM043); Formats: Digital download	–
Brave Star EP	"Siren"	Released: October 2012; Label: Excentric Muzik (EXM043); Formats: Digital download	–
Brave Star EP	"Defender"	Released: October 2012; Label: Excentric Muzik (EXM043); Formats: Digital download	–

== Singles ==
=== As lead artist ===
List of singles by Fergie as lead artist
Single title	Track titles (original tracks only)	Release date	Record label	Peak chart positions
Single title	Track titles (original tracks only)	Release date	Record label	UK
"People Are (Still Having Sex)"	"People Are (Still Having Sex)"	1999-04-03	Trade	–
"People Are (Still Having Sex)"	"Ooh Sir"	1999-04-03	Trade	–
"2 Da Top (Reach!)" (with Alan X as The Carry On Gang)	"2 Da Club"	1999-10-05	Xtrax London	–
"2 Da Top (Reach!)" (with Alan X as The Carry On Gang)	"2 Da Dub"	1999-10-05	Xtrax London	–
"Friction"	"Friction"	1999-11-28	Rudeboy Recordings	–
"Hoovers and Horns" (with BK)	"Hoovers and Horns"	1999-12-18	Nukleuz	57
"Hoovers and Horns" (with BK)	"Turn It Up"	1999-12-18	Nukleuz	57
"Trauma Trax"	"They're Out to Get Me" (with Trauma)	2000–03	Tidy Trax	–
"House of Pain" (with BK)	"House of Pain"	2000-04-08	Nukleuz	87
"House of Pain" (with BK)	"What Is This?"	2000-04-08	Nukleuz	87
"Deception"	"Deception"	2000-08-27	Duty Free Recordings	47
"Teknoise"	"Teknoise"	2003-10-16	Duty Free Recordings	92
"Scaramanga / The Force" (with Agnelli & Nelson as Cortez)	"Scaramanga"	2003-10-22	ID&T	–
"Scaramanga / The Force" (with Agnelli & Nelson as Cortez)	"The Force"	2003-10-22	ID&T	–
"Cheeky Biscuits Vol. 1"	"Lift"	2005-04-29	Cheeky Biscuits	–
"Cheeky Biscuits Vol. 1"	"Annihilating Rhythm"	2005-04-29	Cheeky Biscuits	–
"Funkytech Funkytime" (with Mauro Picotto)	"Funkytech"	2005-07-09	Alchemy	–
"Funkytech Funkytime" (with Mauro Picotto)	"Funkytime"	2005-07-09	Alchemy	–
"The Yarg"	"The Yarg"	2006-12-01	ELP	–
"The Yarg"	"Stigmar"	2006-12-01	ELP	–
"El Capitano"	"El Capitano"	2007-06-15	Excentric Muzik	–
"Larne Express"	"Larne Express"	2007-11-15	Excentric Muzik	–
"Break In / Break-Out"	"Break-In"	2008-04-07	Excentric Muzik	–
"Break In / Break-Out"	"Break-Out	2008-04-07	Excentric Muzik	–
"Blackeye-P / The Baddness"	"Blackeye-P"	2008-09-16	Excentric Muzik	–
"Blackeye-P / The Baddness"	"The Baddness"	2008-09-16	Excentric Muzik	–
Collaboration EP Volume 1 (with Reset Robot & Alan Fitzpatrick)	"Gas Mask"	2009-02-23	8 Sided Dice	–
Collaboration EP Volume 1 (with Reset Robot & Alan Fitzpatrick)	"Rattlesnake"	2009-02-23	8 Sided Dice	–
"Eye of Storm / Maktub"	"Eye of Storm"	2009-08-17	Excentric Muzik	–
"Eye of Storm / Maktub"	"Maktub"	2009-08-17	Excentric Muzik	–
"Ragaroo"	"Ragaroo"	2009-12-23	Excentric Muzik	–
"Motion"	"Motion"	2010-02-17	Excentric Muzik	–
"Slazenger"	"Slazenger"	2010-05-21	Excentric Muzik	–
The Resistance EP	"Invader"	2011-01-31	Excentric Muzik	–
The Resistance EP	"Stealth"	2011-01-31	Excentric Muzik	–
"Rocketman"	"Rocketman"	2011-04-20	Excentric Muzik	–
"The Rise"	"The Rise"	2011-05-18	Excentric Muzik	–
"Dirty Dubz (From Dubz)" (with Matador)	"Gaswhopper"	2011-07-13	Excentric Muzik	–
"Dirty Dubz (From Dubz)" (with Matador)	"The Score"	2011-07-13	Excentric Muzik	–
"Blackout"	"Blackout"	2011-08-25	Housekeepin Rekords	–
"The Edge"	"The Edge"	2011-12-28	Excentric Muzik	–
"Rockin Muzik"	"Rockin Muzik"	2012-06-06	Excentric Muzik	–
"RU-Ready" (as Fergie DJ)	"RU-Ready"	2013-07-23	Weebang Records	–
"Gimme a Kick" (as Fergie DJ)	"Gimme a Kick"	2014-03-04	Weebang Records	–
"Here We Go" (as Fergie DJ)	"Here We Go"	2014-06-17	Weebang Records	–
"Perfect Night" (as Fergie DJ)	"Perfect Night"	2014-09-01	We Are Arcadia Recordings	–
"Perfect Night" (as Fergie DJ)	"Perfect Night" (Fergie DJ "Arcadia" Mix)	2014-09-01	We Are Arcadia Recordings	
"The Tiki" (as Fergie DJ)	"The Tiki"	2014-10-20	We Are Arcadia Recordings	–
"Kenya" (as Fergie DJ)	"Kenya"	2016-06-27	Noise Control	–
"Why Not" (as Fergie DJ)	"Why Not"	2016-08-01	Peak Hour Music	–
"Hurts So Good" (as Fergie DJ, with Otto Orlandi)	"Hurts So Good"	2016-09-16	Garuda	–
"Dutch Courage" (with BK)	"Dutch Courage"	2017-03-13	SLAM!	–

=== As featured artist ===
List of singles by Fergie as featured artist
Single title	Track titles	Release date	Record label
Moods Vol. 2 (Splinter Cell Feat. Fergie)	"Devious"	2005-05-07	Platform
Moods Vol. 2 (Splinter Cell Feat. Fergie)	"Satisfied"	2005-05-07	Platform

=== Released exclusively on compilation albums ===
List of tracks by Fergie released exclusively on compilation albums
Track title	Compilation title	Release date	Record label
"Recluse" (with Gregor Tresher)	Great Carnival Stuff	2008-01	Great Stuff Recordings
"Ireland"	Great Summer Games Stuff	2008-07	Great Stuff Recordings
"Konguro"	Reklusives Volume 1	2010-03-17	Rekluse
"Off da Floor"	Rhythm Distrikt 01	2012-03-14	Toolroom Records
"Well, Well, Well"	Rhythm Distrikt 01	2012-03-14	Toolroom Records
"Raptor"	Rhythm Distrikt 02	2012-09-17	Toolroom Records
"Circulate" (as Fergie DJ)	Arcadia Ibiza Sampler 2016	2016-06-13	Arcadia Records

== Remixes ==
List of remixes by Fergie
Track title	Original artist(s)	Release date	Record label	Peak Chart Positions
Track title	Original artist(s)	Release date	Record label	UK
"Hammer to the Heart" (DJ Fergie Remix)	The Tamperer featuring Maya	1999	Jive Records	-
"Hands Up" (Fergie & BK Mix)	Trevor & Simon	2000–05	Substance Records	12
"Infinity" (Fergie Remix)	CJ Stone	2001-02-16	Incentive	-
"Traveller" (Fergie Remix)	ESP	2001-04-28	Neo	-
"Rock Da House" (Fergie Remix)	Tall Paul	2001–05	VC Recordings	29
"Meet Her at the Love Parade 2001" (Fergie 7" Edit)	Da Hool	2001–07	Kosmo Records / Lightning Records	11
"Meet Her at the Love Parade 2001" (Fergie Mix)	Da Hool	2001–07	Kosmo Records / Lightning Records	11
"Positive Role Model" (Fergie's Sub Dub Remix Edit)	Straight Dave*	2001-10-14	Epic records (released on compilation only)	-
"Everybody's A Rockstar" (Fergie Remix)	Tall Paul	2002-03-29	Duty Free Recordings	60
"Wonderland" (Fergie Remix)	Pants & Corset	2002-10-08	N2 Records	-
"Neutron" (Fergie Remix)	Darren Christian	2003-02-05	Duty Free Recordings	-
"Shout" (Fergie Radio Edit)	Tears For Fears	2004	Mercury Records	-
"Shout" (Fergie Extended Remix)	Tears For Fears	2004	Mercury Records	-
"Shout" (Fergie Excentric Double Dub)	Tears For Fears	2004-07-16	Mercury Records	-
"The Book" (Fergie Remix)	Salt City Orchestra	2007-03-23	Excentric Muzik	-
"Itchy Glitchy Spider" (Fergie Remix)	Bigger Than Jesus	2008-03-31	Silver Planet	-
"Hinode" (Fergie Mix)	King Unique	2008-04-11	Curfew	-
"Dirty" (Fergie Mix)	King Unique	2008-08-07	Curfew	-
"Gatex" (Fergie Remix)	Umek	2008-09-26	1605 Music Therapy	-
"City Of Gods" (Fergie Remix)	Namito	2009-02-25	Great Stuff Recordings (released on compilation only)	-
"Trouble in Paradise (Variation on a Theme)" (Fergie Excentric Mix)	UNKLE	2009-04-05	Surrender All	-
"Letter To No One" (Fergie Remix)	Yousef	2009-04-08	Circus Recordings	-
"Work It" (Fergie Remix)	Christian Smith & John Selway	2009-05-21	Tronic	-
"Do It Like This" (Fergie Remix)	Jet Project	2009-06-15	Darkroom Dubs	-
"Softie" (Fergie Remix)	Reset Robot	2009-06-18	Excentric Muzik	-
"Positive Education" (Fergie's Just For Pressure Remix)	Slam	2009-08-17	Soma Quality Recordings	-
"Zephyr" (Fergie Remix)	Fiord	2009-10-09	Sprout	-
"Directions" (Fergie Remix)	Psycatron	2009-12-10	Tronic	-
"Feniksas" (Fergie Remix)	King Unique	2010-04-29	Bedrock Records	-
"Follow Me Down" (Fergie Excentric Muzik Mix)	UNKLE	2010-09-12	Surrender All	-
"Noise To Noise" (Fergie Remix)	Joseph Capriati	2011-02-21	Analytic Trail	-
"Right On, Right On" (Fergie's Super Soul Remix)	Silicone Soul	2011-04-04	Soma Quality Recordings	-
"Hazart" (Fergie Remix)	Konstantin Yoodza	2013-03-11	Agile Recordings	-

*a character in the Pet Shop Boys & Jonathan Harvey musical Closer To Heaven, played by Paul Keating.

== BBC Radio 1 Essential Mixes ==
List of Essential Mixes by Fergie broadcast on BBC Radio 1
Location	Broadcast date
Studio session	14 January 2001
Live from Godskitchen, Leeds	6 May 2001
Studio session	29 July 2001
Live from Godskitchen, Birmingham	28 October 2001
Live from Trade, London	7 July 2002
Live from Eden, Ibiza	10 August 2003
Live from Radio 1's Big Weekend, Sunderland	8 May 2005
Live from Global Gathering	31 July 2005
Live from Space, Ibiza	14 August 2005
Live from Meganite, Ibiza	11 August 2006
Live from Café Mambo, Ibiza	13 August 2006
Live from Lush!, Northern Ireland	24 September 2006
Studio session	22 April 2007
