= Deep & Chilled Euphoria =

Remix album (DJ mix album) by Red Jerry
- Released: 15 January 2001
- Recorded: 1993–2000
- Genre: Ambient; chill-out
- Length: 155:42
- Label: Telstar TV; BMG
- Producer: Red Jerry

Euphoria chronology
Hard House Euphoria (2000)	Deep & Chilled Euphoria (2001)	'True' Euphoria (2001)

Deep & Chilled Euphoria is a DJ mix album digitally mixed by British DJ Red Jerry as part of the Telstar TV's Euphoria series of DJ mixed dance music compilations. Released as a sequel to Jerry's previous installment in the series, Chilled Euphoria (2000), Deep & Chilled Euphoria features more of a "chill" sound than its predecessor, and features an array of ambient music from different artists. The album was described in its liner notes as "an attempt to enhance the experiences that exist in meditative states" where "rapidly produced states of deep relaxation increase suggestibility, receptivity to new information and enhance access to subconscious material," as was discovered in a 1950s study by neurologist William Grey Walter referred to in the liner notes.

The album was released in January 2001 by Telstar TV and BMG, and was a commercial success, reaching number 5 on the UK Compilation Chart. It was also a critical success, many praising its eclectic array of artists and pure ambient sound. Some of the tracks were exclusive to the album and previously unreleased. Matt Borghi of Allmusic called it "a well crafted two-disc set that would find itself nicely in any audiophile's recording collection" and "an excellent recording and one that warrants attention." Another, final chill out installment in the Euphoria series, Chilled Out Euphoria, was released ten months later in October 2001.

== Background and conception ==
The Euphoria series of DJ mixed electronic dance compilation albums began in 1999 with the release of PF Project's Euphoria: For the Mind, Body and Soul. The series was based entirely on trance music to begin with, but as it progressed, installments based on other electronic music genres were released, such as the Lisa Lashes-mixed hard house compilation Euphoria Hard House (2000). The installment which departed most from a trance sound was Chilled Euphoria, digitally mixed by Red Jerry and released in May 2000. Digitally mixed instead of mixed with analogue equipment, the album focused on chill-out music for relaxation, featuring music from genres such as ambient music and trip hop, and was a commercial and critical success. In 2001, Flaton Izbac, one of the producers of the Euphoria albums, commented that "Chilled Euphoria turned out to be one of those albums that people kept talking about, emeails, letters, etc., thanks to Sarah HB from Radio 1 for the exposure on the Post Clubbing Favourite Breakfast Show and those of you who now own a copy". Its success secured a follow-up album. However, it would have a slightly different theme.

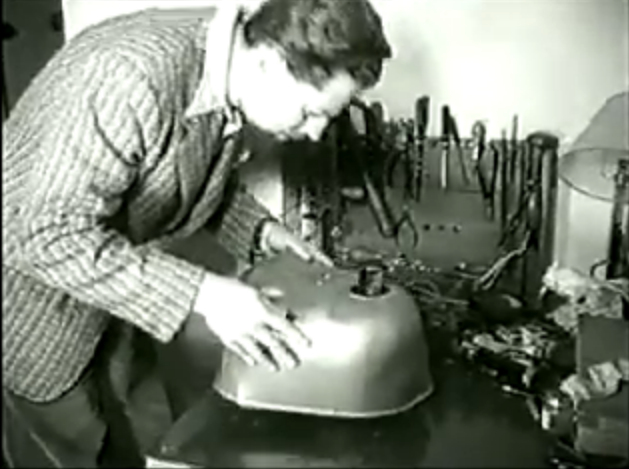
Flaton Izbac's liner notes compare the album's concept to the results of a study on audiovisual meditation by neurologist William Grey Walter (pictured in 1949).

Referring to experiences where he would play chill out music in the early hours of the morning after returning home from a nightclub, Izbac commented that, for him, "the post club sessions are where the most memorable experiences lie. Once you have gone from a number of ludicrous conversations (what does Transcendental really mean?), then it is time to lie back and drain every last drop of the evening's entertainment, as the mind slides into a heightened meditative state of consciousness." Commenting in 2001 on various practices that can "aid this journey", he noted how ancient shamans and poets learned how to use "the flickering images within a fire to enhance their creativity," and how Ptolemy discovered in approximately 200 AD that "when he placed a spinning spoked wheel between an observer and the sun, the flickering of the sunlight through the spinning wheel could cause patterns and colours to appear before the eyes of the observer and could produce a feeling of "Euphoria"."

Further noting how "humans have remained enthralled by the effects of rhythmic sounds and aware of the mind-altering and brain wave entertainment effects of rhythmic noises and lights," he said that "for thousands of years, musicians and composers have consciously influenced the brain states of listeners by manipulating the frequency of the rhythms and tones of their music. Ancient rituals for entering trance states often involved both rhythmic sounds and flickering lights produced by candles or bonfires." He commented how British neurologist William Grey Walter discovered that rhythmic flashing lights quickly altered brain wave activity of the whole cortex instead of just the areas associated with vision. Finding familiarity with Walter's conclusion that "the rhythmic series of flashes appear to be breaking down some of the psychological barriers between different regions of the brain," Izbac said that "rapidly produced states of deep relaxation increase suggestibility, receptivity to new information and enhance access to subconscious material. This in turn may help you move away from habitual patterns of behaviour and become more flexible, creative and at ease with each other."

For the sequel album to Chilled Euphoria, the creators of the Euphoria series decided to make an album "specifically intended" to enhance the experiences in such meditative states. Again approaching Red Jerry to digitally mix the album, the album was named Deep & Chilled Euphoria and was conceived in late 2000 for release in early 2001 after the release of Dave Pearce's first installment in the series, Transcendental Euphoria, in November 2000, and Lisa Lashes' first installment to the series, Hard House Euphoria, in December 2000. Although Hard House Euphoria was a commercial success, it was not as much a critical success. The new Deep & Chilled Euphoria album would allow the series to recoup its critical standing. It was Jerry's third mix album for the series, following 'Deeper' Euphoria (1999) and the aforementioned predecessor to the new album, Chilled Euphoria (2000).

== Music ==
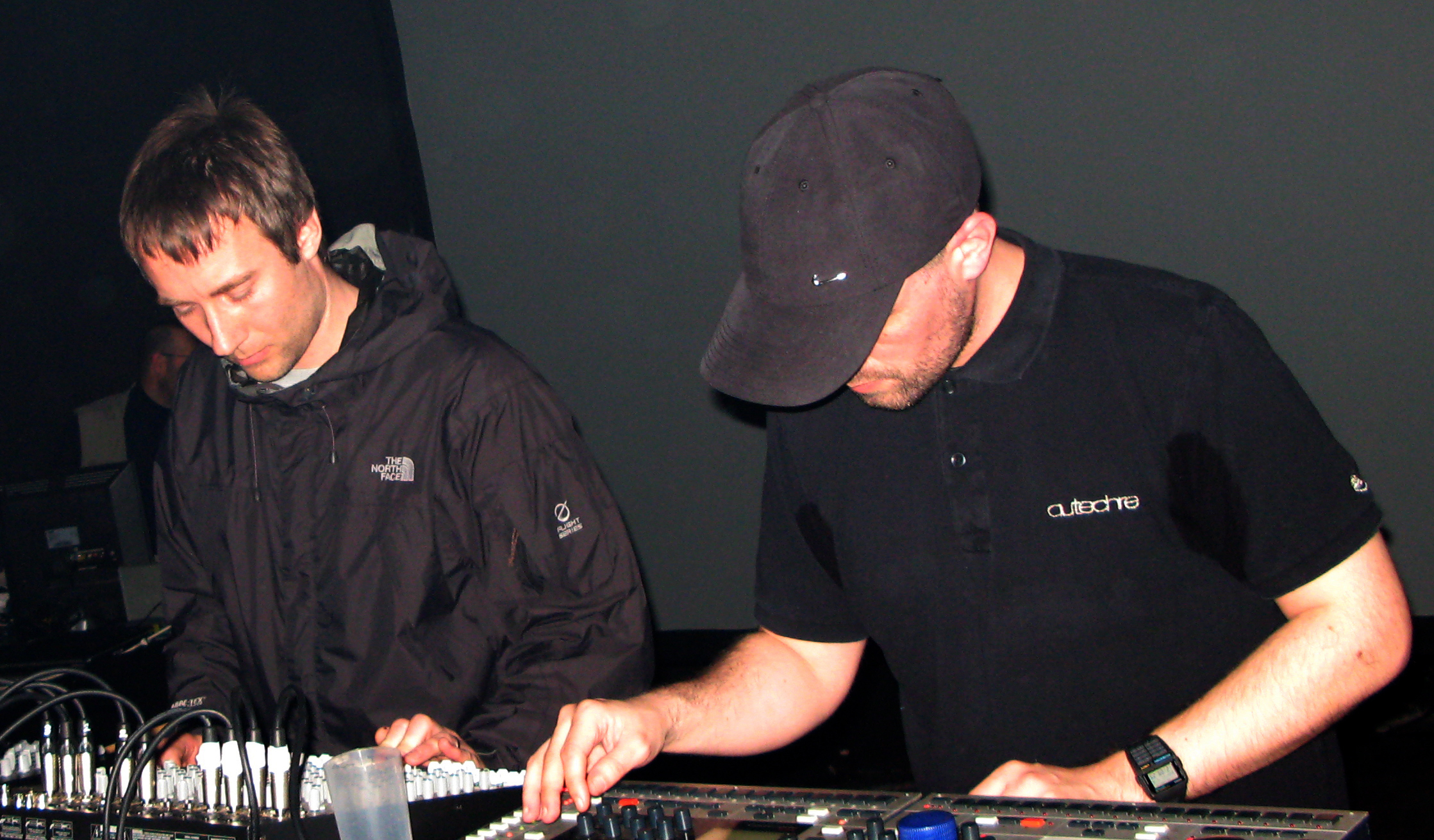
The inclusion of music from artists such as Autechre (pictured) lead to some critics claiming the album was more eclectic than its predecessor.

Izbac said that Deep & Chilled Euphoria was "specifically intended" to enhance the experiences that exist in meditative states where "rapidly produced states of deep relaxation increase suggestibility, receptivity to new information and enhance access to subconscious material." He asked listeners to "let the process happen, do not attempt to force it or control it. If distracting thoughts arise simply observe them, let them go and return to the process. Some of this may seem a little farfetched, especially if you do not have a flotation tank at your disposal." He also commented to listeners that "at least there is a substantial amount of post club waffle to indulge in or maybe you would just prefer to close your eyes and enjoy the swirling patterns that draw you down deeper and deeper into the music."

The album contains two discs of material that Red Jerry has digitally mixed together. Spanning a total of twenty-nine tracks cross-licensed from different record labels, the album has been described as more "chill" than its predecessor. In the words of Matt Borghi of Allmusic, the album shows Jerry mixing together "a cornucopia of brilliant, free-flowing chill-out tracks into a two-disc trek through the darker side of the U.K. dance scene." It shares some artists in common with its predecessor, such as Moby, but also features new additions from eclectic artists such as IDM pioneers Autechre who appear twice on the album, progressive trance disc jockey Sasha, big beat musicians Groove Armada, iconic breakbeat group Coldcut, and "a small army of lesser-known ambient sound artists and producers." As with its predecessor, some of the tracks were previously unreleased and exclusive to the album. The album is often sparsely instrumental, with almost all of its tracks being played at full length, with exceptions being excerpts of Kinobe's "Bayou Barrataria", Autechre's "Chiastic Slide" and the "Pinned Mix" Origin's "Wide-Eyed Angel" which play as transitional interludes on the second disc. The album was mastered by Jay at Node.

== Release ==
The album was released as a 2-CD set by Telstar TV and BMG on 15 January 2001. It was the tenth installment in the Euphoria series, and the first release of the series in 2001. As with Chilled Euphoria, the album was promoted with a promotional double 12" EP set with the same name, featuring eight tracks from the album, with two tracks on each side. With all of its eight songs being unmixed by Jerry and each lasting over six minutes long, the total length of the promo was almost an hour long. However, as with all previous editions, it was also advertised with a television advertisement. Featuring a voice-over inviting viewers to "experience the ultimate chill," the advert featured the "Sindaar Remix" of B.B.E.'s "Seven Days and One Week" that features on the album, played whilst the album logo submerges from a blue background in what has been described as an "Alien-style".

Twelve days after release, on 27 January 2001, the album entered and peaked at number 5 on the UK Compilation Chart, spending six weeks on the chart. Although this was a commercial success, its predecessor Chilled Euphoria had entered slightly higher upon its release at number 4. Although the album was released without immediate competition, other record labels had begun to increasingly release chill out compilations, and only a month after the release of Deep & Chilled Euphoria, Ministry of Sound's The Chillout Session reached number 1 on the chart.

== Critical reception and legacy ==
Professional ratings
Review scores
Source	Rating
Allmusic	4/5 stars
Ambient Music Guide	(favourable)

Deep & Chilled Euphoria, like its predecessor, was well received by critics. Matt Borghi of Allmusic rated the album four stars out of five and said that, like its predecessor, it was an "excellently produced recording that showcases the finest in chill-out music" and one of "the finest mixed recordings to come out of the chill-out and ambient dance scene." He said that although it and its predecessor are separate albums, "combined they make for a quite lengthy transcendental listening experience." He observed that with Deep & Chilled Euphoria, Red Jerry "has continued along the same route that he started with Chilled Euphoria, masterfully mixing a cornucopia of brilliant, free-flowing chill-out tracks into a two-disc trek through the darker side of the U.K. dance scene," further commenting that "Deep & Chilled Euphoria is a lot more "chill" than its predecessor, but again, it's a well-crafted two-disc set that would find itself nicely in any audophile's recording collection." He concluded by saying that "this is an excellent recording and one that warrants attention."

Mike Watson of the Ambient Music Guide was favourable to the album and to the three chill out installments in the Euphoria series as a whole. He said that the three "stellar" albums "prove that credibility and mainstream appeal sometimes do magically co-exist. More than any other chill compilations that appeared around the turn of the third millennium - and there were millions of them - these ones define the ecstasy-fuelled bliss of post-clubbing chillout to perfection. Although quite varied in style and possessing a significant pop appeal, there is a defining sound across these double CDs: downtempo remixes and interpretations of the more cosmic strains of 90's progressive trance and house. The Euphoria chill albums manage to capture this sound at its zeitgeist, just before progressive dance sounds went back underground and were eclipsed by the overblown Dutch-style of Eurotrance that dominated dancefloors in the 2000s."

He further commented that "these three albums remain definitive in the world of commercially-orientated chill comps. Unlike many other series where the devotion to chilled house and trendy bar grooves borders on slavish (Ministry of Sound anyone?) this is not music as fashion. Though cleverly marketed, the Euphoria mixes are - to coin a slightly cringeworthy phrase - more about the music. Ambient music. They are not guilty of genre snobbery: inclusion of tracks by Groove Armada (lounge) and Kruder & Dorfmeister (dub) and Autechre (pure techno) is adequate proof of that. But these albums do suggest a recognition that, in the club music of the 90's and beyond, old-school ambient music's legacy has emerged most potently in the subtle, lush, psychedelic qualities of progressive trance and house."

The success of the album secured a third and final chill-out installment to the Euphoria series, Chilled Out Euphoria, released in October 2001. Red Jerry did not return for this installment, and instead Solar Stone, whose song "Jabberwock" had appeared on Deep & Chilled Euphoria in the form of its "Ambient Mix", digitally mixed the album instead. Progressive Sounds compared Jay Burnett's ambient bonus disc from Ben Lost's mix album Lost Language: Exhibition II (2004) to Red Jerry's two Chilled Euphoria albums, saying that although the disc is "a nice addition, it's all been done before and with more class by Red Jerry with the Chilled Euphoria compilations." 5:4 included an excerpt of Deep & Chilled Euphoria's version of the "Irresistible Force Mix" of Coldcut's "Autumn Leaves" on their mixtape, Mix Tape #31: Autumn.

== Track listing ==
=== Disc one ===
1. JFC – "Maximum Reflexion (on a Mountain High)" – 7:07
2. Accadia – "Blind Visions" – 6:39
3. Rados – "My Soul Is at the End of the Universe" – 4:22
4. Leftfield – "Melt" – 3:50
5. Moonman – "Galaxia" (Eliot J Remix) – 5:09
6. Rui da Silva – "The Four Elements "Water"" – 4:43
7. Bliss – "Song For Olabi" (Ambient Mix) – 4:30
8. Solar Stone – "Jabberwock" (Chillout Mix) – 5:39
9. Datar – "B" (Am'B'ient Mix) – 4:53
10. Groove Armada – "Your Song" (Tim 'Love' Lee's Semi-Bearded Remix) – 5:23
11. New Vision – "Fields of Wisdom" – 6:21
12. Space Manoeuvres – "Stage One" (Blain Sandhag Mix) – 6:14
13. Autechre – "Basscadet" (Beaumont Hannant Two Mix) – 7:38
14. Miro – "By Your Side" (Miro's Rolled Mix) – 5:06

=== Disc two ===
1. B.B.E. – "Seven Days and One Week" (Sindaar Remix) – 6:17
2. Xstasia – "Sweetness" (Katcha Mix) – 6:10
3. Medway – "Resurrection" (Dub Mix) – 4:22
4. Coldcut – "Autumn Leaves" – 8:28
5. Three Drives – "Greece 2000" (Moonwatcher's Sea of Tranquility Mix) – 5:33
6. Kinobe – "Bayou Barrataria" – 0:27
7. Autechre - "Chichli" – 1:49
8. Breeder – "Tyrantanic" (Slacker's Magic Kingdom Mix) – 6:39
9. Humate – "Love Stimulation" (Michael Woods Mix) – 7:11
10. Leama – "Melodica" (Ambient Mix) – 5:48
11. Pete Lazonby – "Sacred Cycles" (Healing Mix) – 5:45
12. Sasha – "Baja" – 7:53
13. Sister Bliss – "Sister Sister" (Alaska's Blissed Out Mix) – 6:22
14. Origin – "Wide-Eyed Angel" (Pinned Mix) – 1:46
15. Moby – "My Weakness" – 3:14

== Charts ==
=== Album ===
chart (2001)	Peak position
UK Compilation Chart	5

== See also ==
- Euphoria (compilations)
- Chilled Euphoria
