= Fergie (DJ) =

Northern Irish DJ (born 1979)

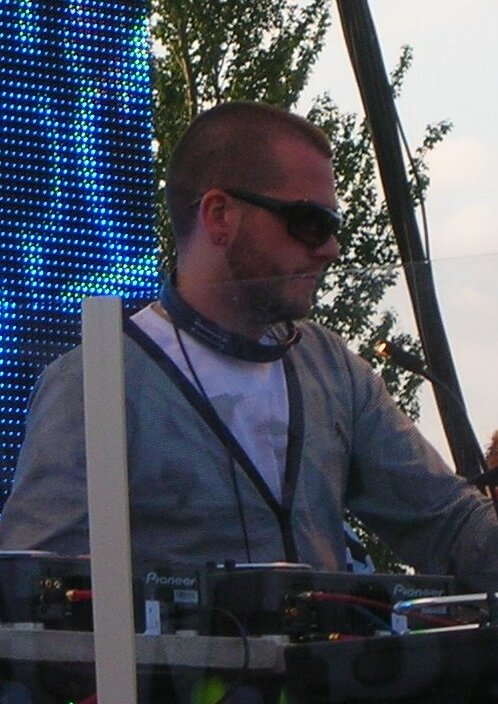
- Fergie performing a DJ set at Radio 1's Big Weekend in Preston, England on 20 May 2007.

Background information
- Also known as: Rob Guson
- Born: Robert Ferguson; 16 November 1979 (age 46)
- Origin: Larne, Northern Ireland
- Genres: Electronic dance music
- Occupations: DJ; music producer
- Years active: 1993–present
- Labels: Nukleuz; Duty Free; Ministry of Sound; Excentric Muzik; Great Stuff; Toolroom
- Website: fergiedj.com

Robert Ferguson (born 16 November 1979), known professionally as Fergie, is a Northern Irish DJ and electronic music artist from Larne. He has been an internationally touring DJ and a music producer for over 20 years. He presented a radio show on BBC Radio 1 for over four years while recording 13 Essential Mixes for the station. He was featured in the DJ Mag Top 100 DJs poll seven consecutive years and currently holds the record for the highest new entry since the poll began, achieved when he was voted 8th in 2000.

Fergie played his first DJ set at the age of 9, standing on an upturned milk crate. He met Tony De Vit who invited him to England and would become Fergie's mentor. His career escalated in the 1990s when he played mainly hard house in his DJ sets at club nights such as Trade, Godskitchen, Sundissential, Golden, and Passion (where he had DJ residencies). He achieved UK Singles Chart success in the early 2000s with releases such as his remix of "Meet Her at the Love Parade". Throughout the 2000s his DJ sets became more house and techno orientated. He DJed in Ibiza every summer at nightclubs such as Amnesia, Privilege and Space. He released multiple DJ mixes including two via the Ministry of Sound record label and magazine covermounted CDs for Mixmag and DJ Mag. He also wrote a regular column for Mixmag. He founded the Excentric Muzik record label in 2007. He has released his debut artist album "Dynamite & Laserbeams" on the label in 2010.

He currently resides in Las Vegas and has been a resident DJ at the Hakkasan Nightclub at the MGM Grand and at the Omnia nightclub of Caesars Palace since they both opened. He also has a DJ residency in Las Vegas at Wet Republic. He is working under the name Fergie (DJ).

== Early life ==
Fergie's first ever visit to a nightclub came at the age of 13 when Michael Collins, a northern soul radio DJ friend of his father, jokingly offered to take him to The Arena (later known as The Met) in Armagh and his parents agreed to it. The DJ on the night was Robbie Nelson (who would later go on to form Agnelli & Nelson) and to enter the club he had to be sneaked in through a fire escape. Recalling the events in 2007 Fergie said, "It was there and then that I wanted to be a DJ. I bugged my Dad's mate in the car on the way back asking him what the music was and what they played." This was his first taste of dance music, and shortly after that, he purchased a pair of turntables.

Fergie would spend his time in the Sounds Good Music record shop in Larne (owned by Mark Dobbin and run with his brother Gleave) instead of attending school. He struggled with his education as, unknown at the time, he was dyslexic. A teacher once made him stand at the front of the classroom whilst warning the rest of the class that if they didn't concentrate on their studies Fergie was the kind of delinquent that they would become. He left school permanently aged 13; after being in a car accident, he took time off to recover and never returned. Instead, his mother, Alice, schooled him at the family home with a focus on skills required for a career in dance music. Around this time, he attended a Hellraiser rave at Ulster Hall in Belfast with Carl Cox performing. It was the experience of this rave which led to the name of his 2010 debut artist album Dynamite & Laserbeams.

Still aged 13, whilst spending afternoons playing for the Northern Ireland national under-16 football team, he began working at The House Nightclub (at the Kilwaughter House Hotel) near Larne. Fergie was too young to enter the club as a customer and so, instead, Mark Dobbin, the promoter of the club, employed him. He gave Fergie a red boiler suit to wear and paid him to collect empty glasses, brush the floor and clean the toilets. It was here Fergie would see the likes of Danny Rampling and Paul Oakenfold perform. As a perk of the job, he was allowed to practise on the club's DJ equipment (with the aid of an upturned milk crate to stand on to reach it). This led to him playing his first DJ gig when he was age 14, a warm-up set at the venue. To get him into other venues, his brother Ken and Robbie Nelson would smuggle him in under a bundle of coats.

His first paid DJ gig was at a nightclub called Airport 2000 in Templepatrick, County Antrim. When a fight broke out, the police brought the night to an early close, then warned Fergie for being underaged and in a place that banned minors from entering. Although, at the time, his DJ alias was DJ Destruction people preferred to call him Wee Fergie, which he became commonly known as. Initially, the music he was playing in his DJ sets was hardcore, although one of the first records he acquired was "Positive Education" by Slam. He continued to DJ at nightclubs while underaged, and was often thrown out of venues by the police, meaning his parents often had to collect him from police stations. By the age of 16, he had played at all the leading clubs in Ireland.

== Career ==
=== 1995–1996: Move to England ===
Fergie first met his future mentor and friend Tony De Vit, the British DJ and producer, in 1995 when he was 15. De Vit was DJing at the Kilwaughter House nightclub, and Fergie took a night off from his own DJ residency (at the Airport 2000 nightclub) to see him play. Fergie managed to meet him in person and persuaded him to let him in the DJ booth during his set. They kept in touch (Fergie would call him up to 3 or 4 times a day) and from then on, De Vit stayed at Fergie's parents' house whenever he performed in Northern Ireland. De Vit invited him to his house in Birmingham, England for a week's holiday and to experience the country's club scene. During the holiday, the IRA ceasefire that was in place at the time back in Northern Ireland ended and Fergie remained in England with De Vit. Fergie accompanied De Vit to his DJ gigs around the UK, which at the time, was usually around 7 or 8 gigs a week. De Vit would ask Fergie to record a DJ mix CD for these car journeys. If he ever heard Fergie manipulate the vinyl with his hand in the recording (a mixing technique he had advised him not to use), he would eject the CD and throw it out of the car window. De Vit would often ask the club promoter if Fergie could play a short DJ set after his, with a reduction in his own set duration if required. It was around this time De Vit first took Fergie to Trade, a weekly party held on Sunday mornings at the Turnmills nightclub in London, where De Vit had a DJ residency. Fergie was still only 16.

=== 1997–2000: Early career and success ===
An early breakthrough in Fergie's DJ career came when he was 17, when he DJ'ed at Trade for the first time. He played in their Test Lounge; a room in the club where new DJs could be tried out and crowd reaction gauged. Present were Tony De Vit, fellow Trade DJs Steve Thomas and Malcolm Duffy, plus Trade owner Laurence Malice (amongst others). This led to a phone call a few weeks later requesting him to play the Trade main room; for his full Trade debut, he played the last set of the event at 12 pm on a Sunday afternoon. He would later become a resident DJ of Trade. In 1997, he played outside of the UK for the first time when he toured South Africa, as the support DJ for Tony De Vit. It was only his second time flying on a plane and De Vit had to be Fergie's named guardian for the trip (he had to be added to De Vit's passport). Fergie's first appearances in Ibiza came in the summer of 1998 with Trade when he played the Space main room, the Bora Bora beach club, and the back room of Privilege. The party at Bora Bora was held by Trade in memory of De Vit who had died not long before. In 2018, Fergie said of De Vit, "Tony was my mentor. I wouldn't be where I am today if it was not for his support. (...) He opened doors for me and was a huge help with the technical side of my DJing too." Fergie told Mixmag in December 2000, "Maybe I wasn't his best friend but he was certainly mine."

After De Vit's death, Fergie received support from both Laurence Malice and Andi Buckley (who became his manager), and together with his own determination, his career continued its upwards trajectory. Fergie's close association with Trade continued throughout 1999. In March, with Trade, he toured the US for the first time; at 19 years of age, he was once again not old enough to legally drink in the venues he was playing in. His debut release "People Are Still Having Sex / Ooh Sir" was released on Trade Records in April. In the summer of that year, he returned to Ibiza to be a weekly resident DJ for the Trade parties, held on Friday nights at the El Divino nightclub, and Saturday mornings at Space. In October, he compiled and mixed the second half of Trade Hotmix '99 (a covermount CD for M8 magazine). At the end of the year, he was nominated for Best New DJ at the Ericsson Muzik Awards and was voted 17th in the Mixmag DJ Awards. New Year's Eve 1999 saw him booked for 6 gigs across the UK for the turn of the new millennium.

In early 2000, he became a resident DJ for Godskitchen, which at the time, was a Birmingham-based nightclub held weekly at The Sanctuary venue. Fergie had been DJing regularly for Godskitchen including their events at The Planet nightclub in Coventry in the mid-1990s. Neil Moffitt, one of the Godskitchen promoters, became another regular source of support for Fergie and his career from this point on. In 2000, he also held DJ residencies at the Sundissential, Passion and Trade club nights in the UK. 2000 also saw Passion offer Fergie his own event at The Emporium nightclub in Coalville to showcase his sound. This became the Friday night event Storm. In March, Fergie's Let There Be Hard House DJ mix was the covermount CD for Mixmag magazine, given away free on the magazine's front cover. In the same month, Fergie's first commercially available DJ mix was released on CD; Fergie compiled and mixed CD1 of Nukleuz Presentz HardHouse Anthems (with the accompanying CD2 mixed by BK). His "House Of Pain" collaboration with BK gave him his first entry into the UK Singles Chart in April, peaking at number 87. Following this, the Trevor & Simon single "Hands Up" which included a Fergie and BK remix reached number 12 in the same chart. Over the summer of 2000, he held a DJ residency for Godskitchen's events at the Amnesia nightclub in Ibiza. Godskitchen regularly attracted between 4000 and 5000 people each night at Amnesia. He also performed on the Godskitchen float at the Radio 1 Love Parade held in Leeds in July. Later that month, he appeared on the cover of DJ Mag for the first time, alongside the headline "The new superstar DJ.

In September 2000, his track "Deception" was released, reaching number 47 in the UK Singles Chart. This was followed by a further collaboration with BK "Hoovers And Horns" re-entering the chart and peaking at number 57. 7 Magazine, the weekly dance music publication, featured Fergie on the front cover of their 13 September issue with the headline "I've been stereotyped as a hard house DJ". The feature was to promote his first commercially available solo DJ mix 7 Live #3: Fergie which was released on CD in the week after. On the inside cover of the CD, the editor of 7 Magazine Damien Morris described Fergie as "The best young DJ in the UK today". In the same month, Godskitchen opened their new nightclub CODE in Digbeth, Birmingham. As well as continuing to DJ regularly at the Godskitchen events held there on Fridays, he simultaneously began a new residency at the club; Polysexual was launched as a weekly 12-hour Sunday party beginning at noon which Fergie hosted with Lisa Lashes. The pair appeared together on the front cover of dance music magazine iDJ to promote the club opening. In the October issue of Muzik, he was placed 29th in the magazine contributors' Top 50 DJs of the World list. November saw him accompany Godskitchen to The Venetian in Las Vegas for their first ever US show. His first entry in the DJ Mag Top 100 DJs poll came in late 2000, at number 8. As of 2018, this is the highest new entry there has been in the history of the poll. He finished the year with a first time appearance on the December cover of Mixmag with the headline "Superstar 2000!".

From 1995 through to 2000, Fergie's DJ sets were composed mainly of hard house music and he became closely associated with it. Sundissential promoter, Madders, attributed the popularity of the sound in 2001 to "Tony (De Vit)'s work in the mid 90s, and people like Andy Farley, Lisa Lashes, and Fergie in the late 90s." However. Fergie had grown uncomfortable with the direction hard house had taken. From 2000, for a period of around two years, he regularly changed his music style and played a wider variety of dance music. In an interview in 2009, Fergie explained, "As I had been pigeonholed as a hard house DJ, I didn't want to (...) jump into another sound. So over the next few years, I dipped my finger in a few different styles from trance to house to a bit of tech house and some techno." In the booklet notes of his 2001 Hard Energy CD, he thought the music he played was better described as hard music rather than hard house. The change in musical direction, away from hard house, initially had a negative impact on the number of DJ bookings he received and the DJ fees he could command.

=== 2001–2006: BBC Radio 1 ===
He made his debut appearance on the Essential Mix radio show, broadcast on BBC Radio 1, on 14 January 2001 after the DJ and producer Judge Jules, who, at the time, hosted his own show on BBC Radio 1, had recommended selecting him. In March, it was announced that he had been signed to Radio 1 as a bi-monthly resident for the Essential Mix show along with Carl Cox. Fergie went on to record three further Essential Mixes in 2001, as the official Radio 1 Essential Mix DJ. Later in March, Fergie won "Essential Relief"; this was a battle of the DJs style competition broadcast live on Radio 1 from the nightclub Home in London, in aid of Comic Relief. Listeners voted via telephone and email and the event was attended by over 2000 people. He beat Carl Cox and Jon Carter in his first two hits, and in the final, he beat Fatboy Slim. The other competing DJs were Judge Jules, Seb Fontaine, Lottie, and Darren Emerson. On 6 May, he returned to the Essential Mix with a live broadcast from a Godskitchen event at Leeds Town Hall. Later in May, a single with his remix of Tall Paul "Rock Da House" as the lead track reached number 29 in the UK Singles Chart. That summer saw Fergie continue his DJ residency for a second year, playing weekly at Amnesia. Another single with a Fergie remix as the lead track made the UK Single Chart in July when Da Hool "Meet Her at the Love Parade 2001" entered the chart at number 11. The readers of IDJ magazine voted Fergie the best newcomer of 2001, resulting in an appearance on the front cover of the July issue alongside Fatboy Slim and Carl Cox (who had also won awards in the poll). After his fourth Essential Mix in October, recorded live from Godskitchen at CODE in Birmingham, he hosted Judge Jules's Radio 1 show whilst Jules was away that week. This was his first time hosting a radio show. Two of his DJ mixes were released by the Ministry of Sound label in 2001. Headliners: 03 Fergie was a double CD released in October. Earlier in the year, he compiled and mixed disc 1 of Hard Energy alongside a DJ mix from Yomanda. Towards the end of 2001, he was voted 16th in the DJ Mag Top 100 DJs Poll and was nominated for the Best DJ award at the Muzik Magazine Dance Awards.

April 2002 saw the Tall Paul single "Everybody's A Rockstar" which included a Fergie remix reach number 60 in the UK Singles Chart. He began hosting his own weekly Friday night radio show on BBC Radio 1 from 7 June 2002. His first show was broadcast live from Larne F.C.'s Inver Park stadium to help raise money for the football club (he had previously helped by sponsoring them) and was billed as his homecoming. Around this time, Larne High School (where Fergie previously attended) invited him to open a new part of the school that had been recently completed and the opening was commemorated with a plaque. He played a set in the Experience DJ Arena at the Glastonbury Festival on 30 June. In July, Fergie's set from Trade at Turnmills was broadcast live on the Radio 1 Essential Mix show as part of the station's Mardi Gras coverage. Also in that month he made his Berlin Love Parade debut. He performed on the BBC Radio 1 float and his set was recorded for broadcast on Pete Tong's Essential Selection radio show later that day. Fergie's "The Bass EP" release in August reached number 47 in the UK singles chart. Also that month, the compilation Godskitchen Summer Trance was released by Sony Music's INCredible record label. Fergie compiled and mixed the third CD of the package, titled "03:AM". The November issue of DJ Mag revealed Fergie was voted 21st in the Top 100 DJs Poll of 2002.

In February 2003, Fergie played for Nottingham based club night Firefly for the first time, at the Marcus Garvey Ballroom. It was an important booking for Fergie at this stage of his career as they were the first club night with a music policy centered around techno to book him and this was the music style he was now predominantly playing in his DJ sets. He went on to play at least once at every venue Firefly held parties at. He returned to the Glastonbury Festival in June, performing on the BBC Radio 1 Outdoor Stage, broadcast live on BBC Radio 1. He compiled and mixed a Mixmag covermount CD for the second time; Fergie's Funky Techno Mix appeared on the cover of the July issue. The mix showcased the kind of techno and tech house music he was now playing in his DJ sets and on his radio show. He also appeared in the following month's Mixmag; in a feature with Sara Cox (a BBC Radio 1 DJ contemporary at the time) the pair together discussed their Ibiza experiences. He was nominated for Best Newcomer at the DJ Awards in September of that year. October saw the release of a collaboration with Agnelli & Nelson under the alias of Cortez on the Dutch record label ID&T. His "Teknoise" single reached number 92 in the UK singles chart in November. He placed 23rd in that year's DJ Mag Top 100 DJs Poll.

In January 2004, he made his second appearance on the front cover of Mixmag. In July, his BBC Radio 1 show moved to a Saturday night slot resulting in the listener figures doubling. By now, his radio show had evolved to encompass electro, tech house and breaks genres alongside techno. That month also saw the release of a DJ mix as a covermount CD for DJ Mag, as part of their DJ International Allstars series. Instead of a snapshot of his current DJ set, the DJ mix was mostly compiled of influential tracks from his past. His remix of Tears for Fears' 1984 track "Shout' was also released during that month. In November, he played Lush!, a longstanding nightclub in Portrush, Northern Ireland for the first time. That year Fergie was the subject of a documentary produced by BBC Three and BBC Radio 1. Super DJs followed Fergie as he revisited his roots in Northern Ireland, juxtaposed with a BBC Radio 1 DJ competition (for DJs under the age of 18) that he was hosting. 2004 saw Fergie begin to hold one off events under the name of Excentric, launching at Air in Birmingham with Godskitchen. He was voted 58th in the DJ Mag Top 100 DJs Poll of 2004.

July 2005 saw the release of his collaboration with Italian DJ and producer Mauro Picotto, "Funkytech / Funkytime". In September, he shared the lineup with Moby at the Nokia Trends festival in Buenos Aires, Argentina. His Excentric events began to be held at Turnmiils in conjunction with The Gallery. He continued to be placed in the annual Top 100 DJs Poll held by DJ Mag, in 2005, he came 60th.

In September 2006, Fergie left Radio 1 due to the station's schedule revamp on evening and weekend shows. The sound and style of his radio show had evolved over the 6 years it was on air and the station wanted him to play dance music closer to the music he played in the earlier years, which he felt he could not do. The final show aired on 23 September 2006 and was broadcast live from Kellys nightclub in Northern Ireland where he interviewed his mother Alice and brother Ken amongst others. Fergie's DJ set from Lush! was broadcast live on the Essential Mix following the final show. Over the lifetime of the radio show, guest DJs were regularly invited for an interview and 30-minute DJ mix. The show also provided a platform for up and coming DJs and producers to showcase their skills. There were live broadcasts from Ibiza, Miami, Glastonbury, the Global Gathering festival (England), the Creamfields festival (England), the Skol Beats festival (Brazil), Coloursfest (Scotland), the Planet Love festival (Northern Ireland) and The Met nightclub (Northern Ireland). These live shows typically featured a live DJ set from Fergie instead of his usual show structure. Reflecting on the show in 2014 Fergie said, "The vibe was just to have a kind of house party feel, I wanted people at home to be involved. It was a show for them hosted by me, music by the people for the people I guess". During the time of his radio show he was also a monthly columnist for Mixmag. The column was at first titled "Mixmag Future Heroes" and later as "Stick It Out! With Fergie". The column provided exposure for up and coming talent, often conjunctively with his radio show and events at the Turnmills club in London. He made his seventh consecutive appearance in the Top 100 DJs Poll of 2006, finishing in 80th place.

=== 2007–2011: Launch of Excentric Muzik ===
In 2007 Fergie launched his own record label by the name of Excentric Muzik as an outlet for the music that he had been writing and producing with new studio partner Dave Robertson. The label's first release was a re-release of Salt City Orchestra's "The Book (Bookin Da Beats)" from 1995. Fergie first heard the track whilst working at the Kilwaughter House Nightclub, when Matthew Roberts (of King Unique) played it in his DJ set. The re-release included two new remixes from Fergie and German DJ and producer Gregor Tresher. He also launched Excentric Artists, a DJ agency created to nurture and assist up and coming talent. His events under the Excentric brand began to occur more frequently in 2007, including at The Key in London, in Birmingham at the Custard Factory (in conjunction with Ultra+) and a weekly party in Ibiza throughout that summer. In April he returned to BBC Radio 1 for the first time since leaving the station to record an Essential Mix. This brought the total number of Essential Mixes he has had aired to 13. A notable booking came that year when he played the long running Belfast event Shine, in the Mandela Hall.

His 2008 began with the release of the collaboration "Recluse" with Gregor Tresher . He launched a second record label with Mr Henry Von called Rekluse. On Boxing Day of that year he played at seminal techno event Pressure (at The Arches in Glasgow) for the first time. He remixed Slam's "Positive Education" track as an exclusive for his DJ set that night although it did receive a full release through the Soma record label the following year. This DJ set had additional significance to Fergie as it meant over the course of his career he had played at all three of the major Glasgow club nights held at The Arches, the other two being Inside Out and Colours.

February 2009 saw the release of "Collaborations EP Volume 1" featuring tracks written with Reset Robot and Alan Fitzpatrick. In April, "Remix Stories Vol. 2" by British act Unkle was released which included a Fergie remix of "Trouble in Paradise (Variation on a Theme)".

In May 2010 his remix of King Unique's "Feniksas" was released by the record label Bedrock. September saw the release of his second remix of UNKLE, "Follow Me Down". Later in the year he launched a third record label, again with Mr Henry Von, called Tribal Rage. He was interviewed by Mixmag for both their magazine and YouTube channel in September, to discuss the career of Tony De Vit as part of their The Greatest DJ Of All Time feature. His debut artist album Dynamite & Laserbeams was released in October through his own Excentric Muzik label. The album was a critical success with positive reviews in offline and online publications such as Mixmag, DJ Mag, Data Transmission, IDJ and Tilllate. The album also won the Best Album award at the Irish Dance Music Awards 2011. The title of the album referred to the experiences of his youth in Northern Ireland when young people from communities that would otherwise not mix would come together at rave events.

On the back of his album release, the January 2011 issue of Mixmag named Fergie as 2010's comeback of the year. In 2011 he was asked to remix Silicone Soul's 2001 track "Right On, Right On" as part of a series of releases to mark the Soma record label's 20th anniversary. A Fergie remix of Joseph Capriati "Noise To Noise" was also released in July. In August he performed on the main stage as a headliner at the Dance Valley festival in the Netherlands. He recorded a monthly podcast titled Fergie's Excentric Muzik Session throughout the year which ran for ten episodes and could be described as having a similar style and structure to his former Radio 1 show.

=== 2012–present: Move to US ===
Fergie relocated to Las Vegas in 2012 to begin a DJ residency at Wet Republic (MGM Grand Las Vegas) that was offered to him by former Godskitchen owner and (at the time) Angel Management Group owner Neil Moffitt. Fergie later that year hosted his own monthly party at Wet Republic called Lock, Stock & Ready To Rock. DJ residencies also commenced in 2012 at Pure Nightclub (Caesars Palace) in Las Vegas and HQ Nightclub (Revel) in Atlantic City. With his move to America and the start of his new DJ residencies came a drastic change in the musical style he was known for; the music he had been playing prior to this was not suited to the new audiences he was playing for. This style change took him roughly a year of performances to master. Initially for his DJ appearances in the US he performed under the alias Rob Guson to avoid confusion with the singer of the same name. He also used this alias at the Global Gathering 2012 festival in July to perform on the House stage. In December he released a Rob Guson remix of Planet Perfecto's "Bullet in the Gun" as a free download in conjunction with the record label that released the original track in 1999, Perfecto. In early 2013 he returned to performing worldwide as Fergie although in the US he is now billed as Fergie DJ.

He became a resident DJ at Hakkasan Nightclub (MGM Grand Las Vegas) when it opened in April 2013. He was featured in an advert in GQ magazine, to promote the opening of the club, alongside the other launch resident DJs. Since the Hakkasan Nightclub opened, he has been featured on the outdoor video billboards of the MGM Grand to promote his DJ appearances. In an interview in 2014 he described this as one of the highlights of his DJ career, "Seeing the image of myself on the Las Vegas strip topped it all off. It took me back to being 14 years old my bedroom in Larne and reminded me of everything I've done in the past". As part of his Hakkasan residency in 2013 he launched his Hakkasan show Arcadia. This was accompanied by Arcadia On Air, a weekly radio show and podcast hosted by Fergie. Arcadia On Air was launched in January 2014 and ran for 92 episodes.

In 2015 he gained another Las Vegas DJ residency when Omnia Nightclub (Caesars Palace) opened. He also began a monthly DJ residency at Haven Nightclub (Golden Nugget), Atlantic City. On 19 October 2016, Fergie appeared on the Fox News TV programme Fox & Friends in connection with the third presidential debate that was held at the University of Nevada, Las Vegas. He appeared on the front cover of the 8 December edition of Las Vegas magazine Industry Weekly. In 2017 he became a resident DJ at Roscoe's Tavern, Chicago. During the year he played DJ sets in Las Vegas a total of 235 times. He credits the advice and support of Neil Moffitt and James Algate for the success of his career since moving to the city.

As of 2018, Fergie holds DJ residencies in Las Vegas at Hakkasan Nightclub, Omnia Nightclub and at Wet Republic.

== Discography ==
As well releasing many singles of his own work, he has released a number of mix albums for labels including Ministry of Sound and remixed artists such as Tears for Fears, Slam, Umek, UNKLE and Silicone Soul. Fergie released his debut album Dynamite & Laserbeams on his Excentric Muzik label in 2010.

=== Chart singles ===
- "House of Pain" (2000) – UK No. 87 †
- "Deception" (2000) – UK No. 47
- "Hoovers and Horns" (2000) – UK No. 57 †
- The Bass EP (2002) – UK No. 47
- "Teknoise" (2003) - UK No. 92

† Billed as Fergie & BK

=== Chart singles (remixes) ===
- Trevor & Simon - "Hands Up (Fergie & BK Remix) (2000) - UK No. 12
- Tall Paul – Rock Da House (Fergie Remix) (2001) – UK No. 29
- Da Hool – "Meet Her at the Love Parade 2001 (Fergie Mix)" (2001) – UK No. 11
- Tall Paul – "Everybody's A Rockstar (Fergie Remix) (2002) – UK No. 60

=== Albums ===
- Dynamite & Laserbeams – Excentric Muzik (2010)

=== DJ mix albums (commercially available) ===
- Nukleuz Presents Hard House Anthems Mixed By BK & Fergie – Virgin (2000)
- 7 Live #3: Fergie – DMC (2000)
- Hard Energy Mixed By Fergie and Yomanda – Ministry of Sound (2001)
- Headliners: 03 Fergie – Ministry Of Sound (2001)
- Mixmag Live: Fergie – DMC (2004)
- Toolroom Presents Rhythm Distrikt 02 Mixed By Fergie – Toolroom Records (2012)

=== DJ mix albums (magazine cover CDs) ===
- M8 Presents Trade Hotmix '99 Compiled and Mixed By Fergie and Guy Williams – M8 Magazine (1999)
- Let There Be Hard House – Mixmag (2000)
- Fergie's Funky Techno Mix – Mixmag (2003)
- DJ International Allstars: Fergie – DJ Magazine (2004)

=== Essential Mixes (broadcast on BBC Radio 1) ===
- Studio session (2001)
- Live from Godskitchen, Leeds (2001)
- Studio session (2001)
- Live from Godskitchen, Birmingham (2001)
- Live from Trade, London (2002)
- Live from Eden, Ibiza (2003)
- Live from Radio 1's Big Weekend, Sunderland (2005)
- Live from Global Gathering (2005)
- Live from Space, Ibiza (2005)
- Live from Meganite, Ibiza (2006)
- Live from Café Mambo, Ibiza (2006)
- Live from Lush!, Northern Ireland (2006)
- Studio session (2007)

== Filmography ==
List of television and home video appearances
Title	Year	Role	Notes
First Stop	2002	Himself	Featured in an item on the show, broadcast on BBC Two Northern Ireland.
Godskitchen – Global Gathering The Movie	2002	Himself	Interview.
Ministry Of Sound: The Annual 2003 DVD	2002	Himself	"Fergie in Belfast" short film.
Super DJ's	2004	Himself	A short film broadcast on BBC Three.
Creamfields 2004	2004	Himself	Interview, broadcast on MTV Dance.
Inside Out	2006	Himself	Featured in an item on the show, broadcast on BBC One Northern Ireland.
TONY DE VIT is the Greatest DJ Of All Time... by FERGIE	2010	Himself	An interview published on Mixmag's YouTube channel.
Fox & Friends	2016	Himself	A guest appearance in an item aired on Fox News.

== Awards and nominations ==
List of awards and nominations received by Fergie
Year	Institution or publication	Nominee / work	Award	Result	Citation
1999	Ericsson Muzik Awards	Fergie	Best New DJ	Nominated	
2001	IDJ Awards 2001	Fergie	Best Newcomer	Won	
2001	Muzik Magazine Dance Awards	Fergie	Best DJ	Nominated	
2002	Big Buzz WKD Awards	Fergie	Best DJ	Won	
2002	Irish Radio Awards	Fergie	Best Radio DJ	Won	
2003	DJ Awards	Fergie	Best Newcomer	Nominated	
2006	Northern Ireland Dance Music Awards	Fergie	Best Northern Irish DJ	Won	
2007	Northern Ireland Dance Music Awards	Fergie	Best Northern Irish DJ	Won	
2011	Irish Dance Music Awards	Dynamite & Laserbeams	Best Album	Won	

=== DJ poll results ===
==== DJ Mag Top 100 DJs ====
List of Fergie's DJ Mag Top 100 DJs results
Year	Position	Notes	Citation
2000	8	New entry	
2001	16	–	
2002	21	–	
2003	23	–	
2004	58	–	
2005	60	–	
2006	80	–	

==== Muzik Magazine Top 50 DJs of the World ====
List of Fergie's Muzik Magazine Top 50 DJs of the World results
Year	Position	Citation
2000	29	
