= Steve Blake (DJ) =

British hard house disc jockey and record producer

- Origin: London
- Genres: Hard trance, Hard house
- Occupation(s): Record producer, Disc Jockey
- Years active: 1990 -
- Labels: Tidy Trax, React, Tripoli Trax, Nukleuz

Steve Blake is a London-based trance and hard house disc jockey and record producer. He has released a number of well-received records, and plays high-tempo bass-heavy DJ sets at c. 145 BPM.

== Career ==
Blake started as a disc jockey in c. 1990 in the London club scene, and from 1997 began to play hard house sets in underground clubs. He came to prominence with his 1999 release "Expression", on the Tidy Trax label. It achieved chart success, was widely played by club DJs at the time, and received critical praise with journalist Mark Kavanagh of Muzik magazine calling it a "classic". In 2002 Blake released the single "I Get A Rush", which peaked at #13 in the UK official dance chart, and has been featured on several dance music compilation albums including Extreme Euphoria mixed by Lisa Lashes, which reached #16 in the UK compilation album chart. Blake has released approximately 20 singles over his producing career, and has also released a number of remixes of tracks such as "Dreamer" and the K90 single "Breathe".

Blake has regularly collaborated with his fellow hard house DJs, including in 2002 with Nick Sentience to compile and mix the Reactivate Energize album on the React label, which peaked at #84 in the UK official compilations chart. Blake and Phil Reynolds remixed Silent Jealousy, which was included on the Trance X album that peaked at #27 on the Oricon chart in 2001. As of 2023, Blake continues to perform live DJ sets.

== Discography ==
Steve Blake singles
Title	Artist	Year	Peak UK Singles	Peak UK Dance
The Recycle EP	Steve Blake/Hyperlogic	1999	86	10
Expression	Steve Blake	1999		32
Feelin'	Steve Blake	2000		
I Get A Rush	Steve Blake	2002	95	13
Phase 2	Steve Blake & Phil Reynolds	2002		31
