= Euphoria (compilations) =

Series of dance music compilations

The first compilation in the Euphoria series: 'For the Mind, Body and Soul' Euphoria, mixed by PF Project.

Euphoria is a series of dance music compilations that debuted on the Telstar Records label in early 1999. During the first year, Euphoria focused primarily on trance music until mid-2000 when Euphoria released the first chill-out album in the series and the first hard house album in late 2000. Euphoria was later spun off into a number of associated club nights around the UK, Ibiza and Cyprus. Over the course of three years, in excess of 500 tour dates were chalked up with tour DJs such as Adam White, Robert Van Ryn, Simon Webdale and Darren James. The compilations included box sets usually priced at around £20.00. The Euphoria albums were of high quality and still are highly collectible and the earlier versions are somewhat rare.

Frequent DJs and/or producers who have mixed albums include Dave Pearce, Matt Darey, Lisa Lashes, John '00' Fleming, Adam White, The Tidy Boys, Jay Burnett, Red Jerry and Andy Whitby.

When Telstar Records folded in 2004, the brand went to Ministry of Sound recordings.

Since the debut release, the Euphoria brand has showcased other genres in electronic dance music including hard house, hard dance, progressive and psy-trance as well as releasing some (thus far) "one offs" that cover old skool, funky house, hardcore and "mash ups".

Although focusing mostly on "Best of" compilations in recent years under various guises, the Euphoria brand went "back to its roots" in mid-2008 with its first release of new (all encompassing) trance music in 3 years as opposed to the subgenre releases. Summer Euphoria was also the first digital-only release under the Euphoria brand.

With no new releases for nearly 18 months, Ministry of Sound released Euphoria 2011 in September of that year. This was a new direction for the Euphoria brand in that the album contained the latest dance music including the recent fusion of dance beats with R&B.

Telstar also launched the Breakdown (its full name being The Very Best of Euphoric Dance Breakdown) series in 1999, the same year as the inaugural Euphoria album, and this brand also went to Ministry of Sound following the folding of Telstar. Breakdown too focused on electronic dance music, but was never focused on trance music in particular, focusing on a wide range of subgenres of dance music, including non-electronic genres such as a disco edition. The series was computer mixed, but did not list a DJ on its cover, but instead in its liner notes. In the book The Complete Book of the British Charts: Singles and Albums, the Breakdown series is erroneously listed as being part of the Euphoria series.

== List of Euphoria albums by Telstar Records (Telstar TV) (1999–2004) ==
#	Album name	Mixed by	Release year	Catalog #
1	Euphoria - For the Mind, Body and Soul	PF Project	1999	TTVCD3007
2	'Deeper' Euphoria	Red Jerry	1999	TTVCD3064
3	Ibiza Euphoria	Matt Darey	1999	TTVCD3078
4	'A Higher State of...' Euphoria - Level 3	PF Project	1999	TTVCD3095
5	Pure Euphoria	Matt Darey	2000	TTVCD3118
6	Chilled Euphoria	Red Jerry	2000	TTVCD3127
7	Ibiza Euphoria Volume 2	Alex Gold and Agnelli & Nelson	2000	TTVCD3134
8	Hard House Euphoria Volume 1	Lisa Lashes	2000	TTVCD3152
9	'Transcendental' Euphoria	Dave Pearce	2000	TTVCD3155
10	Deep & Chilled Euphoria	Red Jerry	2001	TTVCD3164
11	'True' Euphoria	Dave Pearce	2001	TTVCD3176
12	Hard House Euphoria Volume 2	Lisa Pin-Up & The Tidy Boys	2001	TTVCD3177
13	Progressive Euphoria	John '00' Fleming	2001	TTVCD3183
14	Chilled Out Euphoria	Solar Stone	2001	TTVCD3189
15	Ibiza Euphoria Volume 3	Dave Pearce	2001	TTVCD3199
16	'Total' Euphoria	Dave Pearce	2001	TTVCD3220
17	Old Skool Euphoria	Altern8	2001	TTVCD3233
18	White Label Euphoria	John '00' Fleming	2002	TTVCD3241
19	'Absolute' Euphoria	Dave Pearce	2002	TTVCD3251
20	Extreme Euphoria Volume 1	Lisa Lashes	2002	TTVCD3265
21	Ibiza Euphoria Volume 4	Dave Pearce	2002	TTVCD3274
22	The Very Best of Euphoria	Matt Darey	2002	TTVCD3297
23	Extreme Euphoria Volume 2	Lisa Lashes	2003	TTVCD3305
24	Deeper Shades of Euphoria Volume 1	Jay Burnett	2003	TTVCD3285
25	White Label Euphoria Level 2	John '00' Fleming	2003	TTVCD3327
26	Ireland Euphoria	Al Gibbs	2003	TTVCD3334 (deleted)
27	Extreme Euphoria Volume 3	Lisa Lashes	2003	TTVCD3346
28	3CD Limited Edition Euphoria	Matt Darey & Adam White	2003	TTVCD3365
29	Extreme Euphoria Volume 4	Lisa Lashes & BK & The Tidy Boys	2003	TTVCD3374
30	Deeper Shades of Euphoria Volume 2	Jay Burnett	2004	TTVCD3383

Unusually, the last installment of the Telstar years, Deeper Shades of Euphoria (volume 2) was a co-release with Virgin Records/EMI, who had been rival labels with Telstar in the past. It has been suggested Virgin and EMI helped support the album as Telstar entered closure.

== List of Euphoria albums by Ministry of Sound (2004–2017) ==
#	Album name	Mixed by	Release Year	Catalog #
31	Frantic Euphoria	Anne Savage & Cally & Juice	2004	EUPCD1
32	Infinite Euphoria	Ferry Corsten	2004	EUPCD3
33	Extreme Euphoria Volume 5	BK	2004	EUPCD4
34	The Very Best of Tried & Tested Euphoria	Judge Jules	2004	EUPCD5
35	Frantic Euphoria Volume 2	Anne Savage & Andy Whitby	2004	EUPCD6
36	Beyond Euphoria	DT8 Project	2005	EUPCD7
37	Tidy Euphoria	Lee Haslam & The Tidy Boys & Amber D	2005	EUPCD8
38	Judgement Euphoria	Judge Jules, Eddie Halliwell & Trophy Twins	2005	EUPCD9
39	The Very Best of Uplifting House Euphoria	Jay Burnett	2005	EUPCD11
40	The Very Best of Frantic Euphoria	Anne Savage & Andy Whitby	2005	EUPCD12
41	Classic Euphoria	Dave Turner	2006	EUPCD14
42	Lashed Euphoria	Lisa Lashes	2006	EUPCD16
43	Classic Euphoria Level 2	Jay Burnett	2006	EUPCD17
44	Hardcore Euphoria	Sy & Unknown, Dougal & Gammer, Brisk & Ham	2006	EUPCD19
45	Return to Ibiza Euphoria	Jay Burnett	2007	EUPCD20
46	The Very Best of Extreme Euphoria	Lisa Lashes	2007	EUPCD21
47	Psy-Trance Euphoria	John '00' Fleming	2008	EUPCD22
48	Summer Euphoria	Airwave	2008	Digital download only
49	Tech-Dance Euphoria	Yoji Biomehanika	2008	EUPCD24
50	Psy-Trance Euphoria Level 2	John '00' Fleming	2009	EUPCD26
51	Mash Up Euphoria	The Cut Up Boys	2009	EUPCD25
52	Hard Dance Awards 2009 Euphoria	Andy Whitby, Showtek & Ed Real	2009	EUPCD27
53	Euphoria Run-Fit Workout	N/A	2009	Digital download only
54	The Very Best of Chilled Euphoria	Jay Burnett	2009	EUPCD23
55	Euphoria Trance Awards 2009	Sean Tyas, Simon Patterson & Claudia Cazacu	2009	EUPCD28
56	The History of Trance Euphoria	John '00' Fleming	2010	EUPCD30
57	Hard Dance Awards 2010 Euphoria	Kutski, Andy Whitby vs. Technikal & Ed Real	2010	EUPCD32
58	A Decade of Trance Anthems Euphoria	Jay Burnett	2010	EUPCD31
59	Euphoria 2011		2011	EUPCD33
60	Classic Euphoria Fitness Workout		2012	Digital download only
61	Electronic Dance Music Euphoria		2012	MOSCD304
62	Electronic Dance Music Euphoria 2013		2013	MOSCD333
63	Deep House Euphoria		2014	MOSCD361
64	Electronic Dance Music Euphoria		2014	MOSCD382
65	Euphoria Classics		2017	MOSCD494

== See also ==
- Clubland X-Treme Hardcore (compilation series)
- Bonkers (compilation album series)
- Reactivate
