= Nick Sentience =

British hard house disc jockey and record producer

- Born: Nick Fryer; 1979 or 1980 (age 46–47)
- Origin: Portsmouth
- Genres: Hard house, tech-trance
- Occupations: Record producer, Disc Jockey
- Label: Nukleuz

Nick Fryer (born 1979 or 1980), better known as Nick Sentience, is a British electronic dance music disc jockey and hard dance music producer from Portsmouth, England. He is known for his fusion of music genres including techno, hard house, and trance. Several of his releases have charted in the United Kingdom.

== Career ==
Nick Fryer grew up in Portsmouth, England, and began DJing at the age of 15. He was originally part of a music production group called Sentience with Martin Dawson and Tom Neville; the group's debut CD An Eye For An I was released on Nukleuz in 1998, with some tracks from the album eventually appearing in the video game Carmageddon II: Carpocalypse Now. The group disbanded soon after, and Fryer adopted the group's name as his own. At age 18 he was signed to Nukleuz. He went on to tour worldwide, and in 2001, at the age of 21, was voted in at number 74 in the DJ Mag top 100 DJ rankings.

In 2001 he collaborated with DJ Phil Reynolds to produce the track "Instru(mental)", which was voted hard dance tune of the year and named as the Ministry of Sound single of the month. In May that same year a DJ mix by Sentience, Nukleuz Bomb, was featured as the cover CD of Muzik magazine. In 2002 he collaborated with Steve Blake to compile and mix the Reactivate Energize album on the React label, which peaked at #84 in the UK official compilations chart.

In 2007 Sentience played the Tidy stage at Creamfields. He has released a number of long players, including Universal Language and Dance Planet, followed by in 2011 the album Syncronized. Beat Magazine reported all three as "critically acclaimed".

== Discography ==
Nick Sentience singles
Title	Artist	Year	Peak UK Singles	Peak UK Dance
Easy on the cut	Nick Sentience and Ed Real	2000	94	28
Digital Dialogue	Nick Sentience	2000		25
Freedom	Nick Sentience	2000	87	33
Techno State	Nick Sentience & Harry Diamond	2000	89	26
Instru(mental)	Nick Sentience & Phil Reynolds	2001		
Vision	Nick Sentience	2001	89	16
Ride the Groove	Nick Sentience	2001	100	26
Frantic EP	Nick Sentience & Phil Reynolds	2001	84	
Back 2 Front	Nick Sentience & Phil Reynolds	2001	91	
Flash	BK and Nick Sentience	2002	61	9
