= Alphazone =

German hard trance group

Alphazone is a German hard trance group from Braunschweig, comprising Alex Zwarg and Arne Reichelt. The group was formed in 1995. In 1996 they released their first single - "Overload". In 2001 they became popular with their remix of DJ Kim's "Jetlag" track and in the following years they released several successful singles.

Aliases: Overload, Saturator, Saltwater, D-Mention, Pump Machine, Nightflight, Nebulus, Geoffrey Whiteman, Aramanja, Bias Bros., Crusader.

== Discography ==
- 1998 Fuzzcinating / X-Ray (as Overload)
- 1998 Fanatic / Sunrise (as Saturator)
- 1999 Dreamland (as D-Mention)
- 2000 Mind Driver (as D-Mention)
- 2001 Daydream (as D-Mention)
- 2002 Stay
- 2003 Rockin'
- 2004 Flashback
- 2004 Revelation
- 2004 Desire (as Nightflight)
- 2004 Destination Paradise (as Nebulus)
- 2005 Sunrise
- 2006 My House is Your House (as Crusader)
- 2007 Forever

== Remixes ==
- Aramanja - Memories (Alphazone Sunset Mix)
- Atmosphere - Storm (Alphazone Remix)
- Bas & Ram - Speed of Light (Geoffrey Whiteman Remix)
- BK - Revolution (Alphazone Remix)
- Bossanova - Stonecold (Alphazone Rocktrance Remix)
- Callisto - Ways (Geoffrey Whiteman Remix)
- Dave Joy - Second Chase (Alphazone Remix)
- Cloudchaser - Aerodynamic (Alphazone Remix)
- Digital Pressure - Aftershock (Alphazone Remix)
- DJ Kim - Jetlag (Alphazone Remix)
- DJ Kim - Time and Space (Alphazone Remix)
- DJ Kim - Get Ready to Explode (Alphazone Remix)
- DJ Ozawa - DNA 02 (Alphazone Remix)
- DJ U Hey vs. DJ Minagawa - Survivor (Alphazone Remix)
- DuMonde - Ich Will Raus (Alphazone Vs Ralph Novell German Mix)
- DuMonde - Let Me Out (Alphazone Vs Ralph Novell English Mix)
- Escade - Shuffle Royale (Alphazone Remix)
- Euphonic - Far and Away (Alphazone Remix)
- Evil Angel ft. Kym Marsh - Today (Alphazone Dub Mix)
- Evil Angel ft. Kym Marsh - Today (Alphazone Vox Mix)
- Fragrance - Don't Break My Heart (Alphazone Rmx)
- Fragrance - Don't Break My Heart (Nebulus Rmx)
- Hardy Hard - Silver Surfer (Unofficial Alphazone Remix)
- Hybridia - Try This Beat (Alphazone Remix) (Unreleased)
- Ian Van Dahl - Try (Alphazone Remix)
- JS Ten - Spiritualized (Basswizzards Remix)
- Kira - I'll Be Your Angel (Alphazone Remix)
- Lay-D-Jay - Daywalker (Pump Machine Remix)
- Mat Silver vs. Tony Burt - Ultimate Wave (Alphazone Remix)
- Micro Tools - Triomphe De L'Amour (Alphazone Remix)
- Nish - Sagittarius (Alphazone Remix)
- Ralph Novell - Wrong Love (Alphazone Remix)
- Saltwater - The Legacy (Alphazone Remix)
- Saltwater - Serenity (Alphazone Remix)
- Saltwater - Strange (Alphazone Remix)
- Steve Hill & Nervous - We are Alive (Alphazone Remix)
- Tom Porcell - Not Tonite (Bias Bros. Remix)
- Tomonari And Tommy Pi - C Sharp 2005 (Alphazone Remix)
- Vandall - Can't Explain (Alphazone Remix)
