= Pete Lazonby =

Pete Lazonby (also referred to as Peter Lazonby) is a record producer best known for his singles "Sacred Cycles" and "Wavespeech" released on Brainiak Records. They were featured on many compilation albums including those in the Global Underground series.

"Sacred Cycles" made the UK Singles Chart and was remixed by Quivver, Cass & Slide, and Medway. It contains a sample from a talk from Bhagwan Shree Rajneesh (later called Osho) and a sample from the 3rd Genesis LP (Nursery Cryme), "The Fountain of Salmacis", which is used throughout the track. Upon its re-release on Hooj Choons, it reached #49 on the UK Singles Chart in 2000. In 2006, it was re-released on Lost Language.
