= Trance X =

Remix album by X Japan
- Released: December 4, 2002
- Genre: Trance, house, techno
- Length: 69:07
- Label: Polydor

Trance X is an X Japan remix album released on December 4, 2002. The remixes were done by several DJs. It reached number 27 on the Oricon chart.

== Track listing ==
1. "Silent Jealousy (Phil Reynolds and Steve Blake Remix)" - 6:49
2. "Kurenai (Taka & MOZ Mix Edit)" - 5:28
3. "Scars (Nuw Idols "Scars to Enlightenment Mix")" - 7:08
4. "Art of Life (Stephane K Remix)" - 8:02
5. "Dahlia (Umek "Recycled" Mix)" - 5:32
6. "Rusty Nail (Oliver Ho Remix)" - 4:01
7. "Tears (Valentino Kanzyani's Breakbeat Mix)" - 5:15
8. "Crucify My Love (Mr. Bishi Remix)" - 5:37
9. "Longing (JK Theory "Hard Trace" Remix)" - 5:51
10. "Standing Sex (WM Ptamigan Remix)" - 5:57
11. "Endless Rain (DJ Tokunaga Remix)" - 9:19
