= Chilled Euphoria =

2000 DJ mix album by Red Jerry

Remix album (DJ mix album) by Red Jerry
- Released: 29 May 2000
- Recorded: 1978–2000
- Genre: Ambient; downtempo; chill-out
- Length: 152:58
- Label: Telstar TV
- Producer: Red Jerry
- Compiler: Red Jerry

Euphoria chronology
Pure Euphoria (2000)	Chilled Euphoria (2000)	Ibiza Euphoria II (2000)

Chilled Euphoria is a DJ mix album digitally mixed by British DJ Red Jerry as part of the Telstar TV's Euphoria series of DJ mixed dance music compilations. Chilled Euphoria features chill-out music, in the form of genres such as ambient music and trip hop, cross-licensed from different artists. The album was intended to be played in "post club sessions", where people chill-out in their homes listening to the album after returning home from a dance nightclub at 8 am. Some of the remixes on the album were exclusive to the album and previously unreleased, and five of them were compiled onto a double EP used to promote the album.

The album was released in May 2000 by Telstar TV as the sixth installment in the Euphoria series, and second mixed by Red Jerry. It was both a commercial and critical success, reaching number 4 on the UK Compilation Chart. Critics praised its eclectic array of artists, some well known but mostly underground, and pure ambient sound, standing out from the other chill-out compilations on the market at the time, and today is considered one of the best chill-out compilations of all time, with Matt Borghi of Allmusic retrospectively calling it "an excellently produced recording" and "one of the finest mixed recordings to come out of the chill-out and ambient dance scene". Flaton Izbac, a producer of the Euphoria series, commented that the album "turned out to be one of those albums that people kept talking about". Two further, final chill out Telstar TV-released installments in the Euphoria series, Deep & Chilled Euphoria and Chilled Out Euphoria, were released in 2001.

== Background and conception ==
British record label Telstar TV launched the Euphoria series of DJ mixed electronic dance compilation albums began in 1999, the inaugural release being the release of PF Project's Euphoria: For the Mind, Body and Soul. To begin with, the series was based on euphoric trance music. Four different editions were released in 1999; the aforementioned inaugural volume, Red Jerry's Deeper Euphoria, Matt Darey's Ibiza Euphoria and PF Project's second contribution to the series, A Higher State of Euphoria. Both critical acclaim and commercial success had been given to the series. Eddie Short, a former employee of Telstar and the creator of the Euphoria series, employed some unusual tactics to keep the audiences for the Euphoria series as wide as possible. The "old adage" of "don't tell them what they're dancing to" ensured that the series could develop without any ultra-specific identity at its core. Many years later, Short said "I always refused to let the record company use the word 'trance' at any point during a Euphoria advertising campaign. In dance, genres come and go. Euphoria established a brand identity that the content of the album induces euphoria. I also wanted the flexibility to periodically release sub-brands of Euphoria such as 'Chilled', 'Deeper Shades', 'White Label', 'Hard House'." The series was also often sold on the "strength of its tunes", rather than on the reputation of the DJ mixing it.

After the release of the fifth edition, Matt Darey's Pure Euphoria in April 2000, Short and the other creators of Euphoria, credited as Tailormade Music, looked to create an edition that would not feature trance music or another form of dance music, but instead chill-out music for listeners to relax to. For this new edition, they drew inspiration from experiences where nightclubs would close at around 8 am, and clubbers would, after a somewhat frustrating journey home, finally return home "with a group of friends in tow" and "make the most out of the next few hours", an experience that they compared to fine art, where people would perform chill out activities. Peter Owt, one of the producers of the Euphoria series, explained:

"If you have been standing there at 8 am wondering why the music just stopped, possibly slightly confused that the lights have just come on and have a heartfelt urge to talk to the nearest person, then you are just about ready for the most exquisite part of the evening. Chilling. Of course a few hurdles need to be negotiated first. Where are my friends? Usually followed by find the cloakroom ticket. I do not know why, but there is a great feeling of achievement once your coat has been retrieved and you walk outside the club, almost tasting the fresh air and floating with the eerie sounds of the outside world. You might be lucky and find a cabby who can find your address, or you might have to explain the way home, via a 24hr garage. Maybe it's a game they play, or most of us are short strewn, but they always seem very confused by any details you give them. Walking through the front door of home, with a group of friends in tow, it's Mission Accomplished and time to chill, providing you've come to an arrangement on who's making the tea, the toast and nobody has forgotten the Rizzlas. For many there is a fine art to getting the most out of the next few hours. Stories of the mind slowing down and each muscle releasing one by one can result in a feeling that can only be described as looking down on your own body in a surreal state of separation. These are those who pursue Autogenics. Yoga, smoking, etc for the full chill out experience. All of which can have surprising results providing the mood is right."

The chill-out edition was conceived to achieve such results, allowing for a "full chill out experience". The producers approached Hooj Choons co-founder Red Jerry, who had already mixed the 'Deeper' Euphoria edition, to compile and mix the new edition, which was named Chilled Euphoria for its tranquil concept. Jerry fit the compiling and mixing of the album into his schedule "in between walking the dog", and is thanked by Owt for this in the booklet. Jerry mixed the album digitally instead of with analogue equipment, a departure from earlier editions of the series.

== Music ==
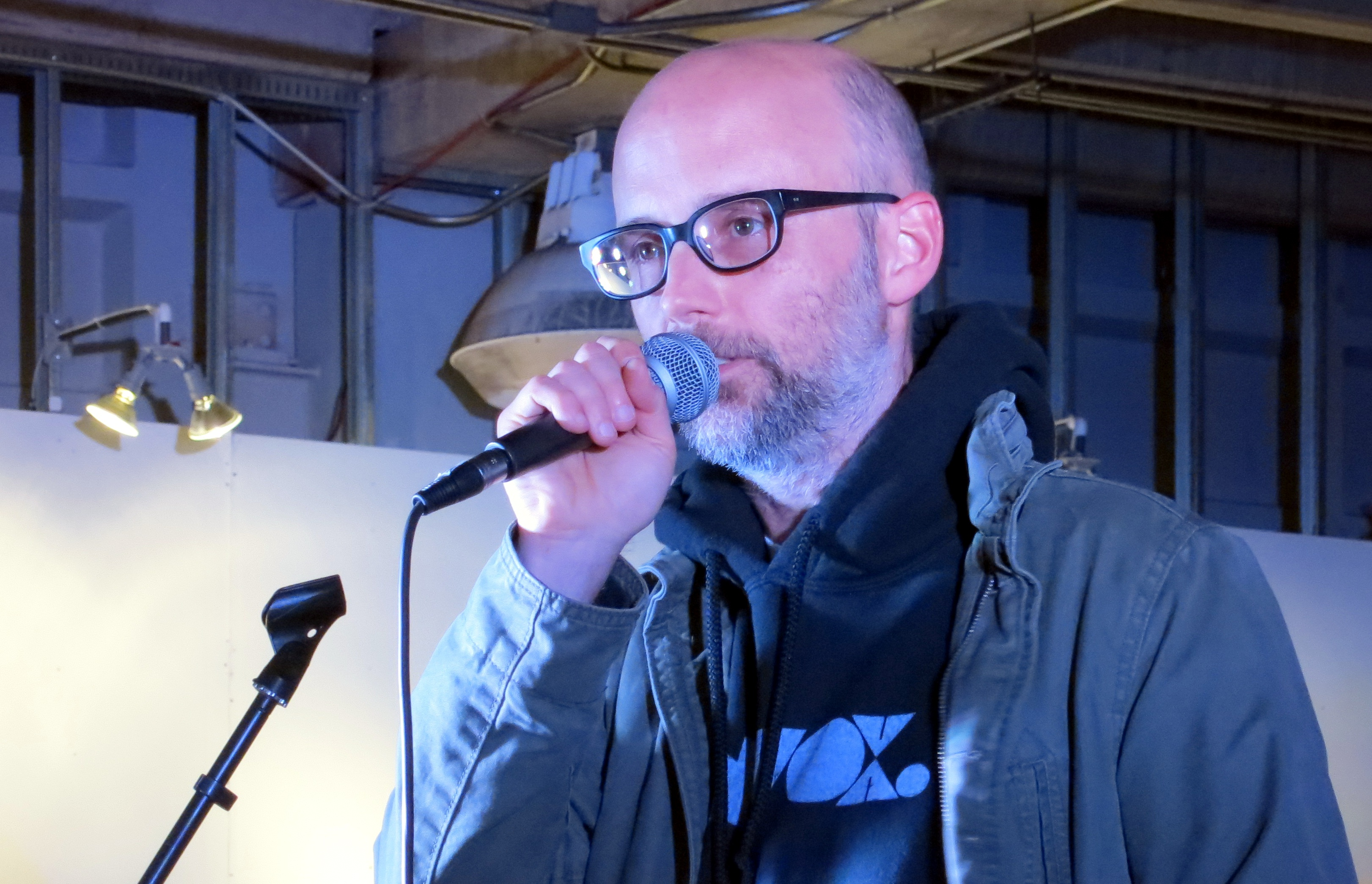
American electronic musician Moby features twice on the album.

According to Owt's liner notes, Chilled Euphoria includes "material written exclusively for the album with the specific intention of achieving" the results of a "full on chill out experience" in a home environment with "a group of friends" after returning home from a dance night club. Owt told listeners to "take time to hear every sound, delve into each layer and let the music feed the creativity that exists deep in all our thoughts. Experience the ultimate chill." The same tagline inviting viewers to "experience the ultimate chill" featured in the album's television advertisement.

The album is double album set of twenty eight tracks digitally mixed by Jerry, spanning different chill-out genres, most prominently ambient music, as well as occasional leans to genres such as trip hop and downtempo. Matt Borghi of Allmusic called the mix "seamless" and said the album contains music "from over two-dozen artists, from ambient master Brian Eno to American dance-loop guru Moby and a gaggle of other artists who are seemingly unknown stateside." The album contains brand new, exclusive, previously unreleased chill-out mixes of Energy 52's "Cafe Del Mar", Lustral's "Everytime", Matt Darey presents DSP's "From Russia with Love", Chicane's "Saltwater", Breeder's "Twilo Thunder", Solar Stone's "Seven Cities", C.M's "Dream Universe" and The Thrillseekers' "Synaesthesia". Five of these remixes were released on a promotional double 12" EP distributed to DJs.

Mike Watson of Ambient Music Guide said that, on the album, Jerry "mixes a smattering of commercial fare like Dido and Moby with a large helping of euphoric instrumentals remixed from popular club tunes sourced mainly from European and UK artists." He commented that although the "deeply gorgeous" ambient remixes of "Cafe Del Mar" and "Synaesthesia" would later appear "on dozens of other comps", they are "at least here we get them all in one place, sitting alongside many lesser known gems that compilers of standard commercial fare just wouldn't bother searching out. The tentative piano chords of Breeder's remixed "Twilo Thunder" and the cosmic sighs of Odessi's "Moments Of Ambience" are two compelling examples". He even noted how Jerry mixes in a long excerpt from Brian Eno's Music for Airports "to great effect, the kind of old-school beatless ambient that's virtually unheard of in this context."

== Release and promotion ==
The album was released as a 2-CD set on 29 May 2000 by Telstar TV. It was the sixth installment in the Euphoria series, and the second of five editions released in 2000. The album packaging features photography by Jamie B and Demon Imaging. Unlike previous editions in the series, the album was promoted with a promotional double 12" EP featuring five of the album's exclusive previously unreleased remixes, namely the Michael Woods remix of "Cafe Del Mar", the Auranaut remix of "Twilo Thunder", the "Alaska's Sunset Mix" of "Synaesthesia", Accadia's "Into the Dawn" and the Alaska remix of "From Russia with Love". One track features on sides one, three and four, whilst two tracks feature on side two. With all of its five songs presented by themselves without being mixed by Jerry, it was distributed to disc jockeys to use in DJ sets. A white label version of the double EP was also distributed.

However, as with previous editions, it was also advertised with a television advertisement. Featuring a voice-over inviting viewers to "experience the ultimate chill", the advert featured the remix of Faithless' "Drifting Away" that features on the album, played whilst the album logo fades in from a condensation background. The first Euphoria album was the first compilation to run television adverts with only one track playing, seen as a huge gamble at the time when few big record labels were willing "to go against the grain", "but those 20 seconds of one track was enough to give you that little tingle at the back of the neck, combined with the Alien style graphics." As such, Chilled Euphoria was the first chill-out album advertised on television in this style. British disc jockey Sarah HB also promoted the album on her BBC Radio 1 show Post Clubbing Favourite Breakfast Show, leading to a boost in sales.

== Reception and legacy ==
Professional ratings
Review scores
Source	Rating
Allmusic	(favourable)
Ambient Music Guide	(favourable)

The album entered and peaked at number 4 on the UK Compilation Chart, becoming the sixth consecutive top 5 album in Euphoria series. It remained on the chart for seven weeks. The album was well received by critics. Matt Borghi of Allmusic published a favourable review, calleing the album an "excellently produced recording that showcases the finest in chill-out music" and "one of the finest mixed recordings to come out of the chill-out and ambient dance scene". He continued, saying "these recordings are exceptional; the quality of the recordings is excellent, the choice of tracks is excellent, the long-running seamlessness of the mix is second to none. Chilled Euphoria is a great set of discs for relaxation." He concluded, "if pure ambient is too relaxing, almost sedate for you, then Chilled Euphoria could quite possibly be the perfect disc for that late-night gathering with friends. Actually, Chilled Euphoria and the latter Deep and Chilled Euphoria form a set that seemingly runs together as one and could provide hours of choice and relaxing listening pleasure."

Mike Watson of the Ambient Music Guide was favourable to the album and to the three chill out installments in the Euphoria series as a whole. He said that the three "stellar" albums "prove that credibility and mainstream appeal sometimes do magically co-exist. More than any other chill compilations that appeared around the turn of the third millennium – and there were millions of them – these ones define the ecstasy-fuelled bliss of post-clubbing chillout to perfection." He singled out Chilled Euphoria for its unusual choice of artists, including Brian Eno, and commended how it combined several better known ambient remixes with "many lesser known gems that compilers of standard commercial fare just wouldn't bother searching out." He further commented it and its two chill-out successors "remain definitive in the world of commercially-orientated chill comps. Unlike many other series where the devotion to chilled house and trendy bar grooves borders on slavish (Ministry of Sound anyone/) this is not music as fashion. Though cleverly marketed, the Euphoria mixes are – to coin a slightly cringeworthy phrase – more about the music. Ambient music. They are not guilty of genre snobbery...But these albums do suggest a recognition that, in the club music of the 90's and beyond, old-school ambient music's legacy has emerged most potently in the subtle, lush, psychedelic qualities of progressive trance and house."

In January 2001, Flaton Izbac, one of the producers of the Euphoria albums, commented that "Chilled Euphoria turned out to be one of those albums that people kept talking about, e-mails, letters, etc., thanks to Sarah HB from Radio 1 for the exposure on the Post Clubbing Favourite Breakfast Show and those of you who now own a copy". Its success secured two several successful follow up chill-out editions, beginning with Deep & Chilled Euphoria in January 2001, also digitally mixed by Jerry, with a concept based around audiovisual meditation, and followed by Chilled Out Euphoria, released in October 2001. Red Jerry did not return for this installment, and instead Solar Stone, whose song "Jabberwock" had appeared on Deep & Chilled Euphoria in the form of its "Ambient Mix", digitally mixed the album instead. Progressive Sounds compared Jay Burnett's ambient bonus disc from Ben Lost's mix album Lost Language: Exhibition II (2004) to Red Jerry's two Chilled Euphoria albums, saying that although the disc is "a nice addition, it's all been done before and with more class by Red Jerry with the Chilled Euphoria compilations."

== Track listing ==
=== Disc one ===
1. Faithless – "Drifting Away" – 3:42
2. Katcha – "Touched by God" (Katcha's Quiet Storm Mix) – 5:41
3. Odessi – "Moments of Ambience" – 5:45
4. Energy 52 – "Cafe del Mar" (Michael Woods Remix) – 10:05
5. The Sabres of Paradise – "Smokebelch II" (Beatless Mix) – 5:10
6. Lustral – "Everytime" (A Man Called Adam's Balearic Remix) – 4:54
7. Matt Darey pres. DSP – "From Russia with Love" (Alaska Remix) – 7:11
8. Brian Eno – "Ambient 1"/"Music for Airports" – 3:35
9. L.S.G. – "Jillanity" (Original Album Version Edit) – 4:08
10. Electribe 101 – "Talking With Myself '98 (Canny Remix) – 5:20
11. Tilt – "Invisible" (Courtyard Mix – Ambient Dub) – 3:09
12. Humate – "3:2" (Bedrock Ambient Mix) – 5:19
13. Chicane – "Saltwater" (The Thrillseekers Remix) – 6:46
14. Moby – "Why Does My Heart Feel So Bad?" – 4:39

Total length: 75:24

=== Disc two ===
1. Accadia – "Into the Dawn" – 7:24
2. Breeder – "Twilo Thunder" (Auranaut Remix) – 4:22
3. Junk Project – "Composure" – 6:28
4. The Gentle People – "Groovin' with You" (Intergalactic Harbour Mix) – 1:11
5. Solar Stone – "Seven Cities" (Ambient Dub) – 5:42
6. Underworld – "Second Hand" – 7:07
7. μ-Ziq – "The Wheel" – 2:03
8. Chicane – "Early" – 3:58
9. Primal Scream – "Come Together" – 9:18
10. Salt Tank – "Eugina" (Sargasso Sea Mix 2000) – 7:29
11. Moby – "Go" (Jam & Spoon Dub) (In Dub Mix) – 5:37
12. C.M. – "Dream Universe" (16B Still Waters Symphony Mix) – 5:19
13. The Thrillseekers – "Synaesthesia" (Alaska's Sunset Mix) – 6:12
14. Craig Armstrong – "This Love" – 5:20

Total length: 77:30

== Chart positions ==
=== Album ===
Chart (2000)	Peak position
UK Compilation Chart	4

== See also ==
- Euphoria (compilations)
- Deep & Chilled Euphoria
