= Ed Real =

British hard house musician

- Born: Ed Jenkins; 1975 or 1976 (age 49–50)
- Genre: Hard house
- Occupations: Record producer, DJ
- Label: Nukleuz

Ed Jenkins (born 1975 or 1976), known professionally as Ed Real, is a British hard house disc jockey and record producer, and manager of the Nukleuz record label.

== Career ==
Ed Real started his DJ career aged 16, and was recruited in 1998 aged 22 to work for Nukleuz going on to become head of A&R and drive the success of the label. He is an original member of the Nukleuz DJ team and also hosted his own DJ night, Riot!, at The End. He has performed at events worldwide including Japan, Australia, and South Africa. Real also organizes the annual Hard Dance awards, which was in its 9th iteration in 2012.

In 2000 Real contributed a mix to the Nukleuz Hard House Anthems 2 compilation album, which peaked at number 16 on the UK Compilation Chart. The Birmingham Post called it a "kicking CD to grace any collection". With Phil Reynolds in 2001 he mixed the Frantic - Future Sound of Hard Dance compilation album, which sold over 50,000 records and peaked at number 17 on the UK Compilation Chart. In 2004 he followed up the Hard House Anthems series, releasing volume 4 and sharing the mixing duties with Rob Tissera.

Real has had two tracks make the UK Singles Chart, "Easy On The Cut" and "20000 Hardcore Members" in 2000 and 2004 respectively.

== Discography ==
Singles
Title	Year	Peak UK Singles	Peak UK Dance	Peak UK Ind.	Notes
"Easy On The Cut"	2000	94	28	25	with Nick Sentience
"Wake Up Call"	2002			31	vs. The Shrink
"20000 Hardcore Members"	2004	83	24	16	
