= K90 (DJ) =

British hard dance disc jockey

- Born: Mark Doggett
- Origin: England
- Genres: Hard house; techno; trance
- Occupations: Disc jockey; record producer
- Years active: 1991-present
- Website: k90.co.uk

Mark Doggett, known professionally as K90, is a British hard house, techno, and trance music disc jockey and record producer whose productions have had significant impact on the hard dance music scene. Doggett also composes music for films and television.

== Career ==
Dogget started his career in 1991 as part of the duo KA90, reportedly working out of a kitchen. Subsequently going solo renamed as K90, he became known as both a performer and a producer.

K90 released his debut long player, the eponymously titled K90, in 1998. The album was reviewed by Muzik magazine as "a rushing ketamine-fuelled trip which veers crazily between darkly beautiful techno and acidic trance". The 2002 album Urban Anthems was also reviewed in Muzik magazine, receiving 4 stars.

In 2002 K90 released the single "Red Snapper". Reviewed in Muzik Magazine as "a super rave bass from hell and a kick-drum made from freshly felled oak to an odyssey of melodic builds and an all-conquering synth riff", it has been named as "arguably one of the most renowned hard dance tracks ever made" as well as "one of the most iconic". The track peaked at number 33 in the UK dance charts and has been included on a number of Essential Mix sets on BBC Radio 1. Also in 2002, the Reactivate Energize compilation featured the track "Breathe" by K90, as well as his remix of the Steve Blake single "I Get A Rush". The album peaked at number 84 in the UK official compilations chart.

In 2004 he started the record label Dataless Recordings. His sixth long play album, Futureproof, was released in 2017. Nick Coles of DMC World stated the album contains "fantastic melodies that appeal to both the trance and hard trance floors alike".

K90 has performed live at many club nights, and also at dance events including the Tidy Weekender, Creamfields, Q-Base, and Global Gathering. Under his original name Doggett composes music for films and television, such as the Mission to the Edge of Space project. In August 2024 his soundtrack for the short film Elixir won gold at the Independent Shorts Awards.

== Discography ==
K90 singles
Title	Year	Peak UK Dance	Peak UK Ind.
Rock the Show	1999		35
Receptor	1999		
Bomb Jack	1999		
Breathe	2002		44
Red Snapper	2002	33	41
Recoverworld Classics Vol 1	2005		47
Energize/Deliverance	2005	40	

K90 albums
Title	Year
K90	1998
Urban Anthems	2002
The Inner Limits	2004
Destinations	2005
Crash!	2008
Futureproof	2017
Viva La Revolution	2019
