= Tzant =

- Origin: Nottingham, England
- Genres: Electronic, big beat breakbeat, tech house (PF Project)
- Years active: 1996–2001

Tzant were a British electronic music group, who had three top 40 singles between 1996 and 1998. Their debut "Hot and Wet (Believe It)", featuring Verna Francis, made number 36 on the UK Singles Chart during September 1996, and two further singles ("Sounds of Wickedness", their most successful single, and "Bounce with the Massive") would make the top 40 in 1998. Tzant's first two releases also found moderate success on the U.S. Hot Dance Club Play chart.

The group consisted of Jamie White, Marcus Thomas (a.k.a. ODC MC, formerly of Clock) and Moussa Clarke. White and Clarke also released records under the name PF Project. White also later released tracks under the name Mirrorball with Jamie Ford, while Clarke, together with Nick Hanson, released under the name Musique. PF Project mixed the first Euphoria compilation album, which peaked at number 1 on the UK compilation chart in 1999. In 2008, Marcus Thomas co-penned Roebeck's underground hit "Just Wanna Be Loved", from the album Hurricanes on Venus, alongside composer Luke Corradine.

== Discography ==
=== Tzant singles ===
Year	Title	Peak chart positions					
Year	Title	UK	UK Dance	EUR	NZ	SCO	US Dance
1996	"Hot and Wet (Believe It)" (featuring Verna Francis)	36	1	—	—	41	—
1996	"I Want Some More...In My Love Life"	88	20	—	—	—	—
1998	"Sounds of Wickedness" (featuring The Original ODC MC)	11	3	46	30	16	46
1998	"Bounce with the Massive"	39	—	—	—	48	—
"—" denotes items that did not chart or were not released in that territory.

=== PF Project albums ===
Year	Title	Peak chart positions
Year	Title	UK
1999	Euphoria (mixed by PF Project)	1
1999	A Higher State of Euphoria, Level 3 (mixed by PF Project)	5
"—" denotes items that did not chart or were not released in that territory.

=== PF Project singles ===
Year	Title	Peak chart positions								
Year	Title	UK	UK Dance	AUS	BEL	EUR	IRE	NED	SCO	SWE
1997	"Choose Life" (featuring Ewan McGregor)	6	4	40	22	21	14	99	5	40
1999	"Walk Away" (featuring Roachford)	—	—	—	—	—	—	—	—	—
"—" denotes items that did not chart or were not released in that territory.

=== Mirrorball singles ===
Year	Title	Peak chart positions			
Year	Title	UK	UK Dance	EUR	SCO
1999	"Given Up"	12	2	47	9
2001	"Burnin"	47	24	—	35
"—" denotes items that did not chart or were not released in that territory.

=== Musique singles ===
Year	Title	Peak chart positions							
Year	Title	UK	UK Dance	EUR	IRE	ITA	NED	SCO	SWI
2001	"New Years Dub" (vs. U2)	15	7	50	13	36	55	11	93
