= Phil Reynolds =

British hard house disc jockey and record producer

- Genres: Hard trance, Hard house
- Occupations: Record producer, Disc Jockey
- Years active: 1990 -
- Labels: Tidy Trax, Nukleuz

Phil Reynolds is a British electronic dance music disc jockey and record producer. He is known for his "unique blend of harder house and trance".

== Career ==
Reynolds has been a resident DJ at a number of London's harder dance club nights, including Frantic, Fevah, and Convergence, and has also been guest DJ at a wide range of nights including at Heaven and headlining at Turnmills and Brixton Academy. Reynolds mixed two volumes of the Frantic - Future Sound of Hard Dance compilation albums, released in 2001 and 2002 respectively. The first, mixed with Ed Real, sold over 50,000 records, and the second volume mixed with Andy Farley peaked at #15 in the official UK compilation chart. Reynolds collaborated with Nick Sentience to produce the track "Instru(mental)", which was voted hard dance tune of the year, named as the Ministry of Sound single of the month, and was featured on the cover CD for the May 2001 issue of Muzik magazine.

Reynolds has regularly collaborated with fellow hard house DJ Steve Blake, including producing several tracks, such as "Phase 2" which made #31 in the official UK dance singles chart. The collaboration with Blake also extended to setting up a record label together, called Impact. As of 2022, Reynolds continues to perform live DJ sets.

== Discography ==
Phil Reynolds singles
Title	Artist	Year	Peak UK Singles	Peak UK Dance
Frantic EP	Nick Sentience & Phil Reynolds	2001	84	
Back 2 Front	Nick Sentience & Phil Reynolds	2001	91	
Instru(mental)	Nick Sentience & Phil Reynolds	2001		
Computer Logic/Vinyl Addiction	Mark Richardson/Phil Reynolds	2001	86	30
Phase 2	Steve Blake & Phil Reynolds	2002		31
