= Peter Harris (producer) =

- Also known as: Blu Peter
- Born: Neath, Wales, United Kingdom
- Origin: Neath, Wales
- Genres: Nu-NRG, techno
- Occupation(s): Disc jockey, record producer
- Years active: 1988–present
- Labels: React
- Website: myspace.com/dj_blupeter

Peter Harris (born 1961), popularly known as Blu Peter, is a British electronic dance music producer and disc jockey from South Wales, who pioneered the nu-NRG music genre in the late 1990s. In the early 1990s, he served as resident DJ at major London nightclubs Heaven and Turnmills. He has performed at raves and nightclubs around the world.

After establishing his DJ career, Harris began producing original music as Blu Peter. He released dozens of 12-inch singles, CD singles, and remixes, many through React Music Limited of London. In 1999, he released his first full-length studio album, Widescreen & Digital.

Harris also partnered with Kevin White to form a production duo called Elevator; together they co-produced numerous singles and EPs from 1994 through the early 2000s. Harris has also produced or co-produced a small number of singles and remixes under the aliases Blu Peter & Sal, The Groove Council, Quench, and Mass. As Blu Peter, Harris compiled volumes 8, 9, 10, and 12 of the Reactivate techno and trance compilation album series.

== See also ==
- Hi-NRG
- Progressive house
