= John Fleming (DJ) =

- Born: John Fleming; 1 April 1969 (age 57); Sunderland, UK
- Genres: Trance; psy trance; goa trance; progressive trance; progressive house
- Occupations: DJ; record producer; musician
- Years active: 1987–present
- Labels: JOOF Recordings, Ministry of Sound, Deconstruction, 3 Beat, Logic, Virgin, Sony
- Website: www.john00fleming.com

John Fleming /ˈflɛmɪŋ/ (or John "00" Fleming; born 1 April 1969) is an English trance producer and DJ from Worthing, West Sussex. He has had releases on record labels such as Ministry of Sound, Deconstruction Records, Logic Records, and 3 Beat Music. He is the owner and operator of JOOF Recordings, which he formed in 1998. He has performed at many clubs including Cream, Gatecrasher, Ministry of Sound, and Godskitchen.

In his early 20s, Fleming battled lung cancer. Fleming was originally involved in goa music, but changed over to harder trance music before shifting to psychedelic trance. He traces his influences back to early 1980s acts such as Jean Michel Jarre, Tangerine Dream, and current acts like Astral Projection, Airwave, Trifonic.

JOOF Radio (formerly Global Trance Grooves) is his monthly mix broadcast on Digitally Imported.

His track The Winds of Change Are Blowing is featured on the viral "Freestyle Dance Teacher" meme.

== JOOF Recordings ==
After many releases, remixes and compilations, Fleming formed the trance label, JOOF Recordings in 1998. The label's first release was a collaboration between Fleming and Russell Floorplay titled "We Have No Reference of Time". Fleming set up subsidiary labels JOOF Deep and JOOF Test Series, however they were short-lived and have not seen any releases since 2006. JOOF has released singles, albums, and remixes from artists including Airwave, John O'Callaghan, Anne Savage, Solar Fields, Mike Dierickx, Wizzy Noise, Anton Chernikov, Oliver Prime, L.S.G. and Liquid Soul. The label has performed well with the trance and psychedelic trance market with many releases, such as LSG – Netherworld 2005 and Airwave – Parallel Lines, which received support from Armin Van Buuren, Tiësto, Above & Beyond and Paul Oakenfold.

In 2011, Fleming set up JOOF V.2, which has seen releases from J. Michael Cober, Elyseun, Red & Blue, Adam Antine, and Gary Delaney.

In 2015, John appointed Gary Delaney, and Daniel Lesden as the new A&Rs for JOOF Recordings, responsible for overseeing the growth of the label. At the start of 2016, John re-branded 'JOOF V2' to 'JOOF Mantra', a hub dedicated to the label's notorious psy-trance sound. 2016 also saw the formation of "JOOF Aura", a new label dedicated to deep-seated, and trance-orientated Progressive House tracks.

== Discography ==
=== Studio albums ===
- 2009 Heaven & Hell (as John "00" Fleming & The Digital Blonde pres. 00.db)
- 2010 Angels & Demons (as John "00" Fleming & The Digital Blonde pres. 00.db)
- 2011 Nine Lives
- 2013 One.Hundred.Ten WKO
- 2016 Alter Ego – No. 1 Beatport Releases
- 2026 The Lost Tribe

=== Compilations ===
- 1996 Qmusic Take 1
- 1998 Reactivate 13
- 1999 Reactivate 14
- 1999 Licensed to Thrill
- 1999 The Best Trance Anthems...Ever!
- 2000 For Your Ears Only
- 2001 Progressive Euphoria
- 2001 Godskitchen:Journeys
- 2002 White Label Euphoria
- 2003 White Label Euphoria: Level 2
- 2003 Godskitchen: Worldwide (credited for first CD)
- 2004 A Journey into Psy-Trance
- 2004 White Label Republic
- 2007 Unfold
- 2008 Global Trance Grooves, Vol. 1: Two Tribes (with Christopher Lawrence)
- 2008 Psy-Trance Euphoria
- 2009 Psy-Trance Euphoria 2
- 2010 The History of Trance Euphoria
- 2011 J00F – DJ Sessions – Volume 2
- 2011 Passion: The Album Vol. 2 (with Bryan Kearney)
- 2014 The Darker Side of the Dancefloor
- 2014 JOOF Editions
- 2015 JOOF Editions, Vol. 2

=== Remix albums ===
- 2011 Nine Lives – The Remixes

=== Extended plays ===
- 2003 Le Voyage EP
- 2011 Nive Lives EP
- 2015 Imperial Generation EP

=== Singles ===
- 1998 "Barraca Destroy" (vs. Steam System)
- 1999 "We Have No Reference of Time" (with Russell Floorplay)
- 1999 "Come on Baby" (with Russell Floorplay)
- 1999 "Black Magic/Whip" (as Transpeed)
- 1999 "Lost in Emotion" – UK No. 74
- 1999 "Perfect World"
- 1999 "Alpha 5"
- 2000 "Free" - UK No. 61
- 2001 "Legato / Sutra" (with The Digital Blonde)
- 2001 "Belfast Trance" (with Simple Minds) - UK No. 74
- 2002 "Genetica" (as featured artist with Hemstock & Jennings)
- 2002 "Ice Cream" (with M.I.K.E.)
- 2003 "Le Voyage"
- 2004 "Dame Blanche" (with M.I.K.E.)
- 2004 "I'm Not Fooled"
- 2004 "Mahadeva" (vs. Astral Projection)
- 2005 "Attention" (with Christopher Lawrence)
- 2006 "Fused" (as John "00" Fleming & The Digital Blonde pres. 00.db)
- 2006 "Rasa Lila"
- 2007 "Endelexia" (with Wizzy Noise)
- 2007 "Twister / 8th Day" (as John "00" Fleming & The Digital Blonde pres. 00.db)
- 2008 "Beyond the Limit" (with Christopher Lawrence)
- 2009 "Oxygene" (as John "00" Fleming & The Digital Blonde pres. 00.db)
- 2009 "Nervous Breakdown"
- 2010 "JAWA"
- 2010 "Angel" (as John "00" Fleming & The Digital Blonde pres. 00.db)
- 2010 "New Beginning / Temple of Spice"
- 2010 "Sunburn / Solomate" (as John "00" Fleming & The Digital Blonde pres. 00.db)
- 2010 "Melatron" (as John "00" Fleming & The Digital Blonde pres. 00.db)
- 2011 "MMX1215"
- 2012 "The 10th Life / The Astrophysical Nebula"
- 2012 "The Fires of Chameleon / Mustang"
- 2012 "Pixelated" (with Dave Seaman)
- 2013 "Dark on Fire (Part 1)" (with Christopher Lawrence)
- 2013 "Dark on Fire (Part 2)" (with Christopher Lawrence)
- 2013 "The Beast from the East"
- 2013 "WKO"
- 2013 "Unexpected Item in the Packing Area" (with Dave Seaman)
- 2014 "Predator" (with Christopher Lawrence)
- 2014 "Ashoka"
- 2014 "Healing"
- 2015 "Tik Tok"
- 2015 "The Devils Bunch Bowl" (with Rick Pier O'Neil)
- 2015 "If I Don't Come Home"
- 2016 "Chemical Equilibrium"
- 2018 "Looking Back. To Look Forward."

=== Remixes ===
- 1994 Sophie's Boys – "Sweet Attitude" (as Jon Flemming)
- 1996 Black & White – "Who Do You Love"
- 1997 Amen! UK – "People of Love"
- 1997 Jimmy Ray – "Are You Jimmy Ray?"
- 1997 Bush Babies – "Delicious"
- 1997 MLS – "Duchess"
- 1997 Non-Alains – "Give It to Me"
- 1997 Wand – "Happiness"
- 1997 Erasure – "Sometimes"
- 1997 Vicki Sue Robinson – "House of Joy"
- 1997 Disco Treats – "People Get Up"
- 1997 Apache Indian – "Real People"
- 1997 Powerhouse – "Rhythm of the Night"
- 1997 Joi Cardwell – "Soul to Bare"
- 1997 Mansun – "Tax Loss"
- 1997 N-Tyce – "We Come to Party"
- 1998 Kinane – "Business"
- 1998 Gloria Estefan – "Don't Let This Moment End"
- 1998 Brain Bashers – "Feel So Good" (Imagination Remix)
- 1998 Slip & Shuffle – "High Energy"
- 1999 Earthbound – "Essence of Life"
- 1999 S2POR – "Make Me Feel"
- 1999 Amen – "Save Me"
- 1999 X-Cabs – "Neuro 99"
- 2000 DJ Mind-X – "Nightingale"
- 2000 Leo Neelands – "Decorum"
- 2000 S2POR – "Either"
- 2000 Morphem – "Hypnotone"
- 2000 Olmec Heads – "Lift Off"
- 2000 Mea Culpa – "Spiritual Light"
- 2000 Sister 2 Sister – "What's a Girl to Do?"
- 2001 Junk Project – "Composure"
- 2001 Antartica – "Illusion"
- 2001 Konkrete – "Law Unto Myself"
- 2002 Energy 52 – "Café Del Mar"
- 2002 Chris Coco – "Albatross"
- 2002 Mark James – "I Love America"
- 2003 Seraque – "Wandering Star (My Dreams)"
- 2003 Discovery – "Missing"
- 2004 The Beetseekers – "Reflexion"
- 2004 B*P*M – "Angel"
- 2005 Agnelli & Nelson – "Everyday" (2005 Remix)
- 2005 Matt Darey feat. Izzy – "Eternity"
- 2005 Flash Brothers – "Faith in Love"
- 2005 L.S.G. – "Netherworld 2005"
- 2006 JEC – "We Can Be Like They Are"
- 2006 Andy Morris – "Conditioned"
- 2006 Jones & Stephenson – "The First Rebirth" (John '00' Fleming 2006 Mix)
- 2007 Triptych – "Electrology"
- 2007 Nicholas Bennison – "Turbomachinery"
- 2010 Infected Mushroom – "Killing Time"
- 2010 John "00" Fleming – JAWA
- 2013 Moshic – "False Emotion"
- 2016 Liquid Soul – "I See the Spirit"
