= Lush! =

Coordinates: 55.198°N 6.635°W

Lush! is a night club in Portrush, County Antrim, Northern Ireland.

Opened in 1996, it has played host to the majority of the world's notable electronic dance music DJs, including Armin van Buuren, Hardwell, Paul van Dyk, Tiësto, Sasha, Ferry Corsten, Fat Boy Slim, Eddie Halliwell and Gordy Annett. The promoter, and manager of the club, Col Hamilton, is also the resident DJ. Music on resident-played nights would generally be house music, but the regular guest DJs are more likely to play trance music.

Shortly after opening, CJ Agnelli of Agnelli & Nelson and Col Hamilton immortalised the club with one of their first releases, titled "Lush", and the later remixes, "Lush Gold". The cover art of both releases featured the club's logo, a large yellow/orange circle. An edition of Discover Records "Live As" series has also been recorded at the venue.

The 2008 DJ Mag Top 100 Clubs places Lush! at number 56 in the world, with it having been unplaced in 2007 and number 24 in 2006. The 2010 list, now voted for by the general public, places the club at number 48. Shows such as the Essential Mix, Seb Fontaine and Judge Jules were broadcast to electric atmospheres. Fergie broadcast his final BBC Radio 1 show live from a pub on the complex. Following the show, his DJ set at Lush! was broadcast live on the Essential Mix. Seb Fontaine was quoted as saying Lush! was one of the best clubs on the planet with an atmosphere not to be matched anywhere else he had ever played.
