= DuMonde =

German trance project

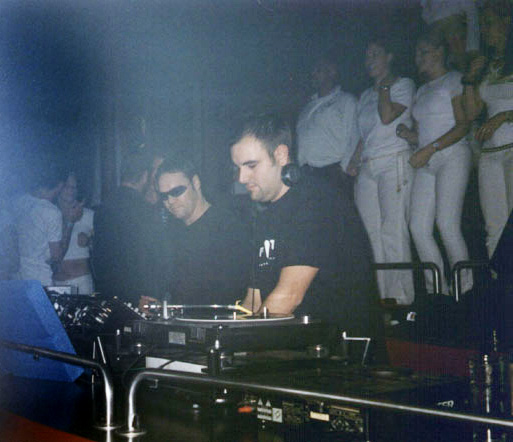
- Dumonde 2002-10-18

Background information
- Also known as: JAMX
- Origin: Germany
- Genre: Trance
- Years active: 1997–2007, 2024–present
- Label: F8T Recordings
- Members: Jürgen Mutschall; Daniel Körber
- Past members: Dominik de León

- It is a German trance project, now led by Jürgen Mutschall (also known as DJ JAMX) and Daniel Körber (also known as D.Mand).
- The German Hard Trance project DuMonde emerged in 1997 from a collaboration between René Dumont, Jürgen Mutschall, and Dominik de León. With a powerful blend of euphoric melodies and driving energy, the project quickly secured a place in the international trance scene. Their early release “Tomorrow” (1998) became a breakout hit, reaching the Top Ten in Germany and appearing on major-label compilations worldwide. Further successes followed with subsequent singles such as “See the Light” and “Just feel free (Tomorrow 2000)” (1999). In early 2000, René Dumont left the group. DuMonde continued as a duo and released trance tracks like “Never lock back,” “Memory,” “God Music,” “Human,” “Kalt,” “Ich will raus” — timeless anthems still played in clubs today. Their remixes for Binary Finary, Alice Deejay, Push, Rank1, AYU, Barthezz, and many others showcased their distinctive sound and solidified their place in the Golden Era of trance. Jürgen Mutschall (also known as JAMX) and de León (aka De Leon) became key figures in shaping the German trance scene of the early 2000s. After disbanding in 2007 to pursue solo careers, DuMonde surprisingly returned in 2024 with “Sometimes.” Now led by founder Jürgen Mutschall and expanded by producer Daniel Körber (aka ), DuMonde once again drives trance forward — honoring their roots while not ignoring the future.

== Discography ==
=== Albums ===
  - On Stage 2004 (Only CD)
  - A Decade (2007) (Only CD)

=== Compilation albums ===
- Techno Club Vol. 12 (with Talla 2XLC)
- Technics DJ Set with DJ Shog
- The Mixes Vol. 01 (Vinyl)
- The Mixes Vol. 02 (Vinyl)

=== DuMonde ===
    - 1998: Tomorrow
    - 1999: See The Light
    - 1999: Fly to the Sky (vs. Anastasia)
    - 2000: Just Feel Free (Tomorrow 2000)
    - 2001: Never Look Back
    - 2001: Memory (vs. Lange)
    - 2002: God Music
    - 2003: Human
    - 2004: Kalt / Cold
    - 2004: Ich Will Raus / Let Me Out
    - 2005: Singularity 2005 (mit Dave202)
    - 2005: What’s in Your Head (vs. Judge Jules)
    - 2006: All Aboard (vs. Judge Jules)
    - 2006: I Feel You
    - 2006: Tomorrow 2006
    - 2007: Gun
- 2024: Unique (JAMX & D.Mand)
- 2024: "Sometimes" (with D.Mand & Talla 2XLC) (2024)
- 2025: "Never Look Back (Rework MMXXV)" (2025)
- 2025: "Light beyond the Shadow (feat. Bill Brown)
- 2025: "Dying of the Light" (feat. Shaun Baker)
- 2025: "Follow me Rework 2K25" (Green Court meets DuMonde)
- 2026: "The Path 3.33"

JAMX & De Leon

  - 1997: Bliss - Bliss
  - 1998: Keep it that way (JAMX)
  - 1999: Sexomatic (JAMX)
  - 1999: Hold It! (De Leon)
  - 2000: Das Licht (JAMX, De Leon, Bossi, Cooper)
  - 2000: Fate (De Leon)
  - 1999: Lost In Emotions (als JAMX @ Nature One)
  - 1999: JDT (JAMX, De Leon, Talla2XLC)
  - 2002: Can U Dig It?
  - 2003: Mind Made Up
  - 2005: Blue Monday
  - 2006: Elektrisch

=== Remixes ===
  - 1998: Sash - La Primavera
  - 1999: Basic Avalon - Firewalk
  - 1998: CJ (Captain Jack) – Dream a Dream
  - 1999: Cyberstorm - Our Energy
  - 1999: Terra W.A.N. - Who's gonna ease the Pressure
  - 1999: Cyrus & The Joker - Launch in Progress
  - 1999: Pulsedriver - The Darkside of life
  - 1999: P2 - fade to grey
  - 1999: Push – Universal Nation
  - 1999: Tin Tin Out - Trance with me
  - 1999: Venga Boys - Paradise
  - 1999: Yves de Ruyter - Free your Mind
  - 1999: Steve Morley - Reincarnation
  - 1999: Tony H - Zoo Future
  - 1999: Talla 2XLC - Love's coming down
  - 1999: Insider - Boots on the run
  - 1999: Rom & Comix - The Warning
  - 1999: Plug 'n' Play - Warp '99
  - 2000: CRW - I feel love
  - 2000: Fragma - Everytime you need me
  - 2000: Sash! – Adelante
  - 2000: Binary Finary – 2000
  - 2000: Lange - Follow me
  - 2000: Metor Seven - Universal Love
  - 2000: Sweep - Running up that Hill
  - 2000: Vectrex - Meteor
  - 2000: Alice DeeJay - Better off alone
  - 2000: Alice DeeJay - Back in my Life
  - 2000: Chelsee - Sweet Destiny
  - 2000: Heliotropic - Alive
  - 2000: Hurley & Todd - Sunstorm
  - 2000: William Hawk - Return to Innocence
  - 2000: Mellow Traxx - Mystery in Space
  - 2001: Pulsedriver - Din Daa Daa
  - 2001: Kaylab - Here we go
  - 2001: Airplay the Music is moving
  - 2001: M.U.T.E - Missed Beat
  - 2001: Angelic - Can‘t keep me silent
  - 2001: Barthezz – On the Move
  - 2002: Jürgen Vries - The Theme
  - 2002: Hi Gate - Saxuality
  - 2002: Marc Aurel - The Sun
  - 2002: Marc Aurel - Running
  - 2002: DJ Snowman - And then they start to dance
  - 2002: Ayumi Hamasaki – Trauma (Limited 30 Vinyl, just promo)
  - 2002: E.L.T. (Every little thing) - Rescue me (no Vinyl)
  - 2003: Dave202 & Phil Green – Moments of Silence
  - 2003: Rank 1 – It’s Up to You (Symsonic)
  - 2004. Shy Brothers - Nemesis
  - 2004: Vincent Stormfield - Sweet Harmony
  - 2005: Nelka / Alex Bartlett - Beautiful Dawn
  - 2005: Balthazar - Insanity
  - 2005: StereoShaker (Barthezz) - Rock & Roll
  - 2005: Beam - Amun
