= Andy Farley =

British dance music disc jockey

- Born: 1966 or 1967 (age 59–60)
- Origin: Tamworth, Staffordshire
- Genres: Hard house
- Occupations: disc jockey, record producer
- Labels: Nukleuz, Tidy Trax
- Website: www.tidy.management/artists/andy-farley/

Andy Farley (born 1966 or 1967) is a British hard house disc jockey and record producer from Tamworth, Staffordshire. Known as the "King of Hard House", Farley plays live sets and produces records, a number of which have achieved success in the UK Dance Chart.

== Biography ==
Farley, who was aged 35 in 2002, is from Tamworth in Staffordshire. His break into the DJ profession is attributed to fellow DJ Tony De Vit. Farley has held DJ residencies at nightclubs including Frantic, Sundissential, Progress and Storm. Farley also performs at music festivals, including in 2001 headlining Dance Valley, Gatecrasher and Godskitchen. He has produced and released music on a number of labels, including Tidy Trax and Nukleuz. The media has dubbed Farley the "King of Hard House".

Along with fellow DJ Lisa Pin-Up, Farley mixed the Nukleuz compilation album series Hard House Nation. Volume 1 reached number 4 on the UK Compilation Chart in October 2000, and volume 2 peaked at number 5 in December of the same year.

In 2012, along with Technikore and Mark EG, Farley released the compilation album Harder Louder Faster. Featuring tracks running at c. 140-175 BPM, Farley contributed a "true" hard house mix, and the album was named as a Mixmag Compilation of the Month for November. The following January, in 2013, Farley released a track with BK, "Feeling", which was named Mixmag Tune of the Month.

== Discography ==
Andy Farley singles
Title	Artist	Year	Peak UK singles	Peak UK dance
"Sundissential EP"	Nick Rafferty/Andy Farley	1999	85	4
"Go"	Andy Farley	1999		
"Get Back"	Trauma vs Andy Farley	2000		21
"Aspirations/The Warning"	Andy Farley	2000		28
"Bring it Back"	Andy Farley	2000		14
"The Killer"	Andy Farley	2000		12
"Stop Rocking"	Andy Farley	2000		22
"Devastating"	Andy Farley	2000	81	11
"Drop That Beat"	Billy Daniel Bunter / Andy Farley	2000		25
"Khemikal Imbalance"	BK & Andy Farley	2001	88	7
"Bring it Back"	Hardbeat PTS Andy Farley	2001	95	10
"It's Farley Pt 2"	Andy Farley	2001		17
"The Future"	Andy Farley	2001		
"Circle of Friends Vol 1"	Andy Farley & Paul Janes	2002	88	
"Hyperventilate"	Andy Farley	2002	88	18
"I Can Feel It"	Andy Farley & Paul Janes	2002		39
"Your Fear"	Andy Farley	2002	87	26
"Chicken Face"	Frank Farrell & John Kerrigan (Andy Farley remix)	2012		
"Feeling"	BK & Andy Farley	2013		
