= Café Mambo =

Coordinates: 38.981171°N 1.296054°E

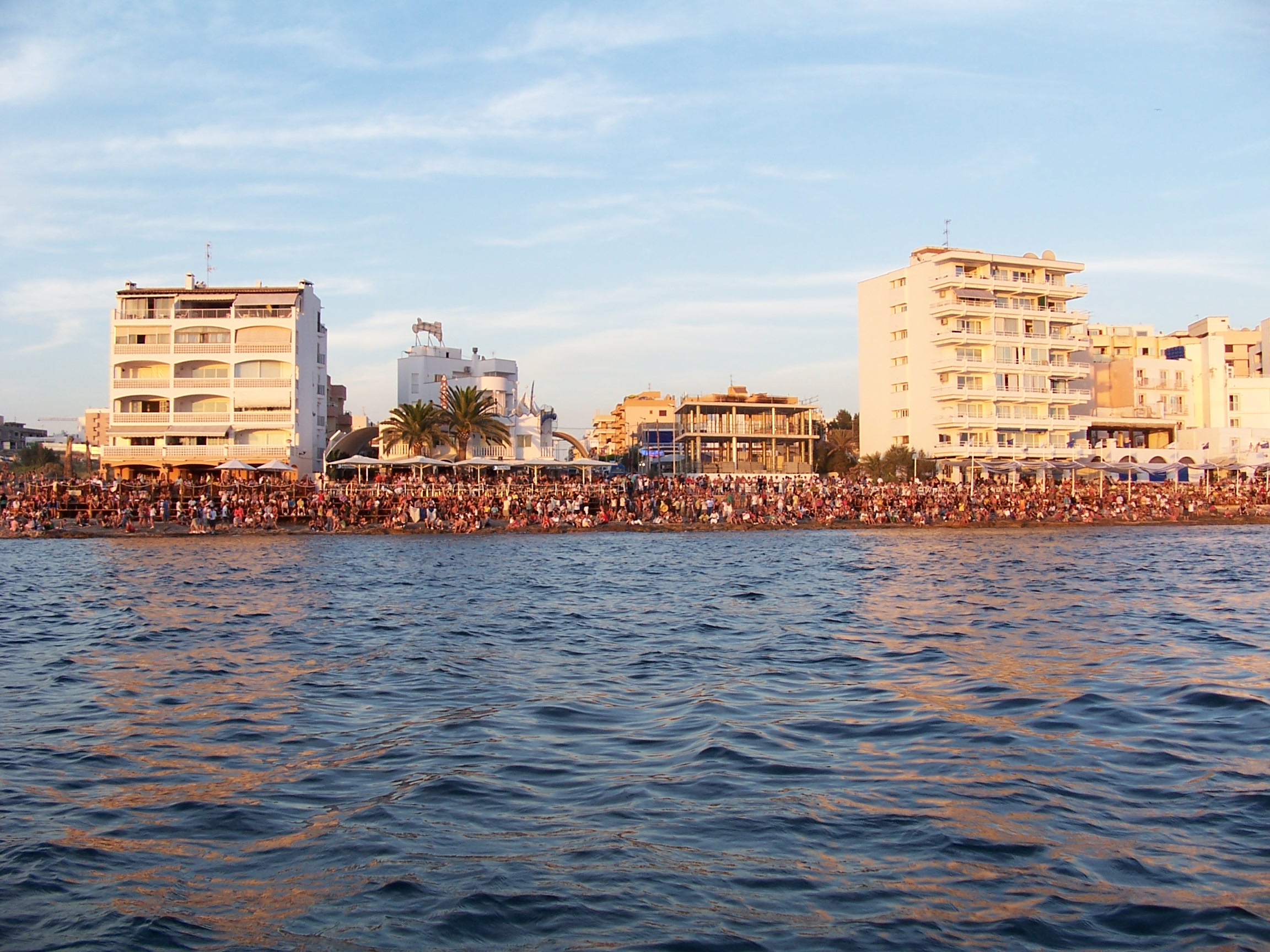
A large crowd gathered to witness the sunset at Café Mambo (left) & Café del Mar (right)

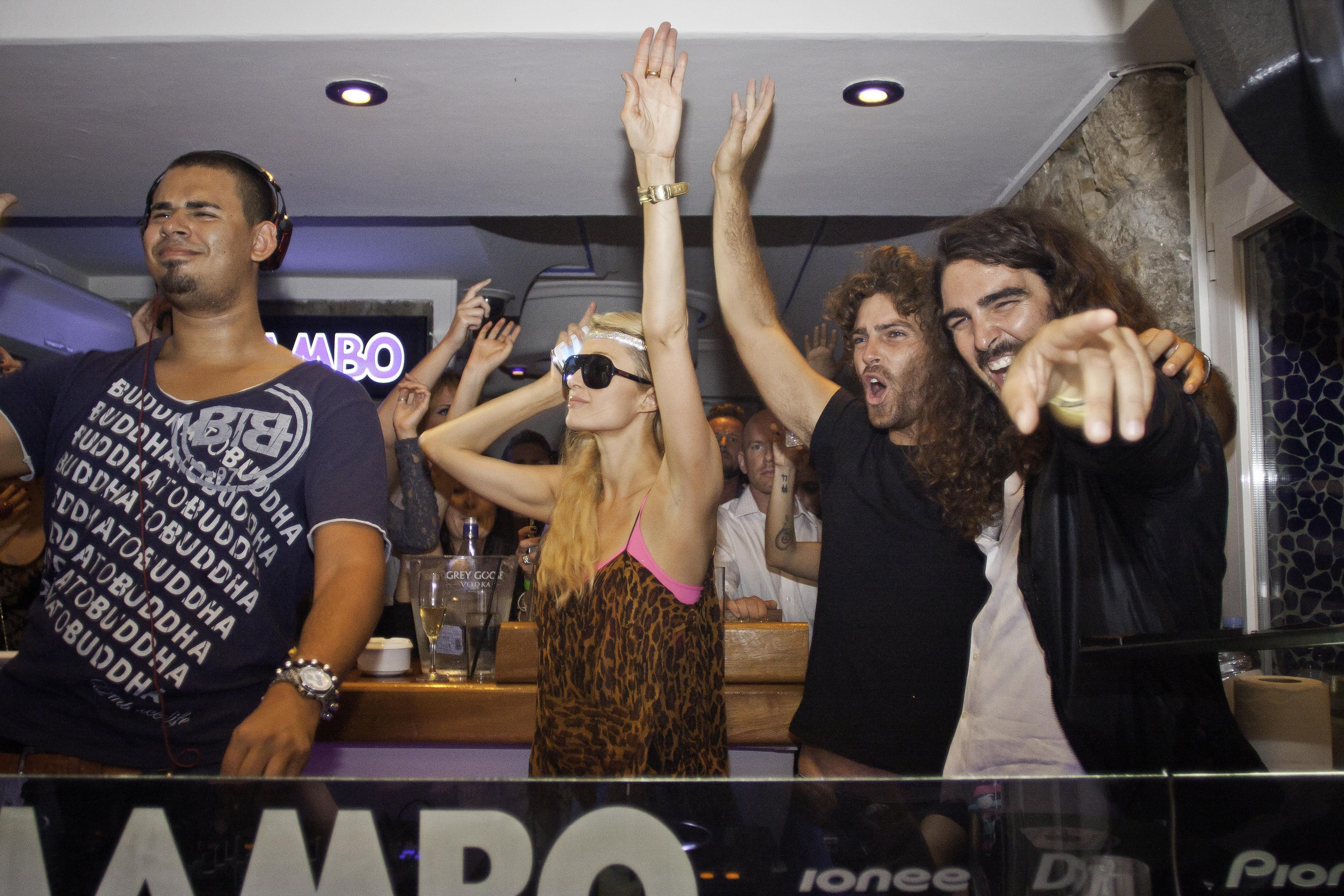
Paris Hilton and Afrojack at Café Mambo

Café Mambo is a bar located in Sant Antoni de Portmany, Ibiza. It is known for being the official pre party point for Pacha Ibiza, and hosting internationally known DJs such as John Digweed, Carl Cox, Erick Morillo, Benny Benassi, Paul van Dyk, Armin van Buuren, David Guetta, Martin Garrix and Swedish House Mafia who have a weekly residency there during the summer.

BBC Radio 1 has hosted all but one of its "Weekends in Ibiza" at Cafe Mambo.

Popular Irish Radio Station RTÉ Pulse also regularly hosts events at the Mambo Studios (directly above the bar).

== History ==
=== Beginning ===
It was established in 1994.

=== Awards ===
Best Ibiza Bar award in the DJ Awards, 2007.

=== Notable Guests ===
Dj Daniel Christie, Dannii Minogue, Craig David, Becky Hill, John Digweed, Paul van Dyk, Armin van Buuren, Afrojack, David Guetta, Calvin Harris, Martin Garrix, Carl Cox, Eric Prydz, Fatboy Slim, Swedish House Mafia, Martin Solveig, Robin Schulz, Alesso, Jonas Blue, Jax Jones, Joel Corry, Benny Benassi, Idris Elba, Diplo, Duke Dumont, Vintage Culture, CamelPhat, Danny Howard, Armand van Helden, Pete Tong, Erick Morillo, Coleen Rooney, Frankie Dettori, Limmy, and Elton John.

=== Resident DJs ===
Mambo's resident DJs include Jason Bye, Andy Baxter, Dee Montero, Danny O, Ridney, Erik Hagleton, Loeca, Ryan McDermott, Doctor Feelgood, Fabiano Pax, Mikey White Isles, Robbie Rambles
