= Tilllate =

Dance music, club culture and lifestyle magazine

- Assistant Editor: David Faulds
- Categories: Music, nightlife
- Frequency: monthly
- Publisher: David Faulds
- Founder: David Faulds
- Founded: 1988
- Country: Scotland
- Based in: Tilllate
- Language: English
- Website: tilllate.world

Tilllate, formerly M8 (named after the M8 motorway between Edinburgh and Glasgow), is a dance music, club culture and lifestyle magazine. Formerly printed, it is now an online magazine with the option to print. It was established in Scotland in 1988.

Its demographic is 18- to 25-year-olds, and it includes fashion stories and artist interviews, club or technology reviews, and coverage of current and predicted trends.

The magazine has hosted parties in locations such as Miami, New York City, Ibiza, Singapore, Thailand, Sydney, Beijing, and Dubai. It has relationships with brands, labels and clubs worldwide, and many of its staff are established club DJs.

Formerly known as M8 Magazine, the magazine acquired the social networking site tilllate.com and so the magazine was rebranded tilllate in August 2009.

M8 magazine was founded by David Faulds in September 1988. As publisher, Faulds appointed numerous successful editors including Mickey McMonagle, now Features Editor at Sunday Mail, Lesley Wright who later edited DJ Mag and Iain Thomson who now runs Essential Ibiza. In January 2011, Tilllate became a global monthly magazine available as an interactive magazine online and also via a print to order service through magcloud.com - this allows for readers across the Tilllate global network to purchase the magazine.

In June 2011, Tilllate launched a US edition, which is now edited by Wilf Ligbott.
