= Medway (DJ) =

American DJ and record producer

Medway (real name Jesse Skeens) is an American DJ and record producer from Orlando, Florida originally, now residing in the United Kingdom, who has released records on such record labels as Hooj Choons and Release Records. He has also had various tracks on many compilation albums in the Global Underground series. In April 2000, his "Fat Bastard (EP)" spent one week at #69 in the UK Singles Chart. In March 2001, his song, "Release", peaked at #67 in the same listing.

As of 2009, he resides in London, and is the owner of Medway Studios.
