= Reactivate =

Trance music compilation album series

Compilation album by various artists
- Released: 1991–2015
- Genres: trance, techno
- Labels: React Music Limited, Resist Music

The Reactivate series is a compilation album series known for pioneering electronic techno and trance music. With 18 releases, and a number of best-of compilations, the series has achieved both chart success and over a million record sales. The albums were published by UK-based React Music over a 24-year period starting from 1991. The Reactivate sound has been reported as significant in the international rave music scene.

== History ==
The first in the series, Reactivate Volume #1 - The Belgian Techno Anthems, was launched by James Horrocks in 1991. Horrocks and React published the series to capture the music typically heard on club nights, and distribute hard to get European rave and techno music. Artists that have been featured in the series include E-Trax, Armin Van Buuren, Mrs Wood, Push, Sven Vath, BBE, GTO, John '00' Fleming, Ferry Corsten, Tiesto, Jam & Spoon, and Tony De Vit.

Volumes 8, 9, 10, and 12 were compiled by DJ and producer Blu Peter, with volume 10 in particular achieving renown for creating the "Reactivate 10 Generation". Volume 18 of the series was mixed by Darren Pearce. In 2015 the best-of compilation, Reactivate 91-01 mixed by Rachel Auburn, was released to positive critical reception with one reviewer stating that, for React, it was "by far their best compilation". In 2023 Reactivate was reported as "back on the dancefloor" with the launch of a new clubwear fashion range that capitalised on the novel artwork used for the album covers.

== Series overview ==
Reactivate releases
Title	Artist	Year	Peak UK Comp
Reactivate #1 - The Belgian Techno Anthems	Various	1991	
Reactivate #2 - Phasers On Full	Various	1991	
Reactivate #9 - Razorsharp beats+bytes	Various	1994	23
Reactivate #10 - Snappy Cracklepop Techno	Various	1995	14
Reactivate #11 - Stinger beats and Techno	Various	1996	14
Reactivate #12 - Pulsing Sub-Aqua Vibrations & Thumping Jello Beats	Various	1997	17
Reactivate #13 - Beats, Chance & Liquid Trance	Various	1998	44
Reactivate #14 - Larry The Lobster's Trancetastic Pot Boilers	Various	1999	30
Reactivate Classics	Various	1998	26
Reactivate #15 - Harry The Hammerhead's Pounding Trance Jawbreakers	Various	1999	37
Best of Reactivate	Various	2000	24
Reactivate #16	Various	2000	29
Reactivate #17	Various	2000	32
Reactivate #18	Various	2001	58
Best of Reactivate 2	Various	2001	37
Reactivate Energize	Various	2002	84
Reactivate ’91 – ‘01	Various	2015	

== See also ==
- Clubland X-Treme Hardcore (compilation series)
- Bonkers (compilation album series)
- Euphoria (compilations)
