= Nukleuz =

UK dance record label

- Nukleuz logo
- Parent company: UK Media Records
- Founded: 1996
- Founder: Peter Pritchard
- Status: Active
- Genre: Hard Dance
- Country of origin: Britain
- Location: London
- Official website: http://nukleuz.com/

Nukleuz is a dance record label based in the Clapham area of London, UK. Nukleuz is the home to many artists and compilation series in various genres including trance, UK hardcore, tech house and hard house.

Nukleuz was established as the new offshoot of Italian record label by UK Media Records boss Peter Pritchard in 1996. The very first releases on the label were more focused around the funky house genre but within a couple of years the label was releasing its first UK hard house productions. Their production output developed pace considerably towards the end of the last millennium and in 2001, Nukleuz won the "Dance Label of the Year" award at the Music Week's annual awards. This was an award achieved through selling merit, not the personal tastes of a judging panel.

Nukleuz has been the home of some notable hard dance acts including BK, Andy Farley, Nick Sentience, Mauro Picotto, Mario Piu, Lisa Pin-Up, Stu Allan, Alphazone, Tom Harding, Phil Reynolds, Organ Donors, Breeze & Styles, Pierre Pienaar, Disco Brothers and more. In recent years, the label has successfully introduced several notable hard dance acts, such as Andy Whitby, Cally & Juice, P.H.A.T.T., Technikal, Dark By Design and Gammer. Nukleuz also began working with Frantic on a series of Frantic Euphoria albums with Ministry of Sound mixed by upcoming artists Andy Whitby & Cally & Juice and achieving commercial success.

Besides Nukleuz's own collective of artists, the label has also licensed a number of tracks from other parts of the world, resulting in them being UK chart-toppers. Notable examples of this are the 2000 re-issue of Belgian techno artist Praga Khan's rave anthem "Injected with a Poison" and Mauro Picotto's "Lizard", which was a top 30 hit in the UK.

In 2005 Nukleuz veered towards a music that was at the heart of its founder, Peter Pritchard (who made his first hardcore record with Stu Allan in 1989), which was coming from within the hardcore scene and found more than they were bargaining for, large numbers of high quality records by a variety of young up and coming producers. Filled with enthusiasm they set about creating hardcore anthems like they had previously made the best Italian Tech Trance and UK hard house and created the successful Hardcore Nation CDs with Warner Music alongside Stu Allan, DJ Seduction & Robbie Long. These albums have become some of the most successful in the world of Hardcore. They have also started a new series with Gut called Hardcore Adrenaline. 2007 saw Nukleuz signing P.H.A.T.T. as the head of the trance label (green) in order to follow up the success of the Trance Sessions albums.

== DJ Nation ==
The label has two of their megamixes make the UK singles chart under the collaborative name "Nukleuz DJs"; the tracks were both entitled "DJ Nation". In order for the records to be chart eligible, the label issued six new tracks spread over three 12" vinyl singles and included the megamixes, lasting just over a minute long, on each release so that sales of all three singles would be combined and hence a higher chart position would be reached. As well as the two top 40 hits, the label had a further three top 75 hits using this strategy.

== Discography ==
- Hardcore Nation: Next Generation
- Hard House Anthems 5 (2004)

== See also ==
- Tidy Trax
- Hard house
- Hard trance
- Lists of record labels
