= BK (musician) =

British hard house record producer

- Born: Ben Keen; 1977 (age 48–49)
- Origin: London
- Genres: hard house
- Occupations: Record producer, Disc Jockey
- Label: Nukleuz
- Website: www.bkworld.net

BK is the working name of the English hard house producer Ben Keen (born in London in 1973).

== Career ==
His "Revolution" single became one of the few hard house records to receive regular airplay on daytime BBC Radio 1, and between 1995 and 2005, he produced over one hundred 12" singles. He was the last artist to reach the UK Singles Chart with a vinyl only release ("Revolution"). He secured six hits in the UK chart. Along with Fergie, BK mixed the first Hardhouse Anthems compilation album in 2000 which reached number 14 in the UK compilation chart.

BK started his career in production at the age of 16, when employed as a trainee engineer. He moved later to writing music for both film and television, having gained recording studio experience at Media Records. He progressed to recording his own music for Nukleuz Records, and performing worldwide as a club DJ.

A regular in the DJ Mag top 100 he was also credited with being a pioneer of the scene and its most successful producer. While the in-house producer at Nukleuz records they won the largest selling independent label award two years running.

In 2021 he launched an educational masterclass to teach aspiring producers how he created his 2002 hit Revolution.

== Discography ==
=== Singles ===
Year	Title	UK Singles Chart	UK Dance	Label
2000	"Hoovers and Horns" †	57	4	Nukleuz
2000	"Let The Rhythm Move You"	83	9	Nukleuz
2001	"Flash" ‡	67	9	Nukleuz
2001	"Khemikal Imbalance" ■	88	7	Nukleuz
2002	"Erection (Take It to the Top)" ¶	48	16	Nukleuz
2002	"Flash" (remix) ‡	61	10	Nukleuz
2002	"Revolution"	42	1	Nukleuz
2002	"Instantly/Jungalize" ♦	81	7	Nukleuz
2003	"Klub Kollaborations"	43	3	Nukleuz

- † Fergie and BK
- ‡ BK and Nick Sentience
- ¶ Cortina featuring BK and Madam Friction
- ■ BK and Andy Farley
- ♦ BK and Anne Savage
