= Hooj Choons =

UK house record label

- Founded: 1990
- Founder: Alex Simons, Red Jerry
- Distributor: -
- Genre: House, progressive trance, progressive house
- Country of origin: United Kingdom
- Official website: hooj.com

Hooj Choons is a British house record label co-founded in 1990 by Alex Simons and Red Jerry, real name Jeremy Dickens. The first release was "Carnival da Casa" by Rio Rhythm Band. With the 1992 release of Felix's "Don't You Want Me", which Red Jerry and Faithless founder-member Rollo co-produced, Hooj Choons had their first crossover hit.

Over the next ten years, Hooj Choons had several notable releases including productions from artists such as Diss-Cuss, Tilt, Oliver Lieb and JX. The label built up a roster of popular club hits, some with widespread commercial success, and smaller underground classics over 20 years. The label also ventured into compilations, releasing a series of mix albums.

== Evolution and revival ==
In 2003, Hooj Choons announced its dissolution, survived by its sub-label, "Lost Language." Hooj Choons concluded with 136 singles and a dozen album-length compilations. Lost Language continued independently, releasing the album Oid by Space Manoeuvres.

In early October 2006, Hooj Choons announced its comeback under the management of the Lost Language owners., with the re-release of Medway's "Resurrection" returning in 2011 with the release The Wasp EP by Dopefish.

== Early Hooj ==
In 2023, early releases on the Hooj Choons label were remastered and issued under the newly created “Early Hooj” by co-founder Alex Simons, this series remastered the label’s initial catalog, re-releasing Hooj Choons No. 1 to No. 20 in high-resolution, 24-bit audio.

== Discography ==
=== Compilation albums ===
- Some of These Were Hooj... (1993)
- Some of These Were Hooj... Two (1995)
- Some of These Were Hooj... Three (1996)
- Deeper Shades of Hooj (1997)
- Deeper Shades of Hooj Vol. 2 (1998)
- Deeper Shades of Hooj Vol. 3 (2000)
- Nu Progressive Era (2001)
- Form+Function (2001)
- Le Future Le Funk (2003)
- Some of These Were Hooj Vol.4 (2009)

== See also ==
- Lists of record labels
- List of electronic music record labels
