= Atomic Jam =

Techno music event in Birmingham, England

Atomic Jam is a techno event in the United Kingdom. Its home is the §Q Club, a converted Birmingham Methodist Church. The club, a three-storey red brick and terracotta Grade II* listed building with a distinctive tower, has a capacity of at least 1,500.

== Overview ==
The event was founded in Birmingham, UK in 1995 with the first event at the Que Club, Corporation Street, Birmingham in August of that year. Richie Hawtin headlined the event.

The club continued at the Que Club every month until 2003, apart from a break in the summer, with the birthday nights taking place in August or September. In 2003, the Que Club closed, leaving Atomic Jam without a home. The event moved firstly to The Sanctuary in Digbeth and then to the Custard Factory before its original venue was re-opened.

After 5 years, Atomic Jam's original venue the Que Club has reopened as the Q Club. It was announced in early May 2008 that Atomic Jam would return to the venue in the last quarter of that year, and the 13th birthday event was held on 22 November 2008, and another event was held on 7 March 2009.

The 14th birthday will be held at the Q Club on 21 November 2009.

== Music policy ==
The music at Atomic Jam is techno in the main room, advertised on the flyers as 'techno and beyond'. Big international DJs and live acts play, backed up by residents Chris Finke and Ade Fenton who play sets at different times of the night. The music always reflects the current trends of techno and the booking policy is a mix of new talent and big established acts.

Room two is drum and bass and dub step, sometimes hosted by Broken Minds and featuring the likes of Grooverider, Andy C, Optical, and Jumping Jack Frost.

Room three has been recently

Room four is the Breakbeat / Electro room hosted by residents Brothers Bud, which over the years has welcomed the likes of Dave Clarke, Radioactive man and Billy Nasty dropping purist Electro sets.

== DJs ==
Atomic Jam has introduced many of the major and minor players on the techno scene to its clubbers, and is renowned for the quality of its resident DJs. The current residents are Chris Finke and Mark Broom.

Selected list of techno DJs who have played at Atomic Jam

- Cari Lekebusch
- The Advent
- Dave Angel
- Adam Beyer
- Joey Beltram
- Steve Bicknell
- DJ Bone
- CJ Bolland
- Catena Mundi (Lc ReVox)
- Dave Clarke
- Colin Faver
- Funk D'Void
- Richie Hawtin
- DJ Hell
- Oliver Ho
- Robert Hood
- Holy Ghost
- Nathan Gregory
- Ignition Technician
- Valentino Kanzyani
- Neil Landstrumm
- Chris Liebing
- Chris Liberator
- Derrick May
- Jeff Mills
- Joe Mull
- Billy Nasty
- OVR (Regis & James Ruskin)
- Gaetano Parisio
- Trevor Rockcliffe
- Rolando
- DJ Rush
- James Ruskin
- Daz Saund
- Ben Sims
- Slam
- Luke Slater
- Space DJz
- Speedy J
- Suburban Knight
- Surgeon
- Sven Väth
- Umek
- Claude Young
- DJ Skull
- Colin Dale
- Joey Beltram
- Gayle San
- Juan Atkins
- Tony Work
- Duncan Disorderly
- Rebekah

== Live Acts ==
Over the years live acts have appeared at Atomic Jam, adding a more improvised feel to the music. Eat Static were the most regular of these, although they have been absent since 2003. Other live acts that have appeared are Bandulu, Green Velvet, Technasia, Speedy J and Radioactive Man.

== Special events ==
In 2002, Atomic Jam hosted an arena as part of the Godskitchen Global Gathering, offering techno from 4 pm until 7 am. It is also part of Drop Beats Not Bombs which also operates at the Custard Factory. In the past decade Atomic Jam has held nights at The Depot in Bristol, Turnmills in London, the Marcus Garvey Centre in Nottingham and at various universities around the midlands.
