= AIR (nightclub) =

Nightclub in Birmingham, England

Coordinates: 52°28′32″N 1°52′57″W

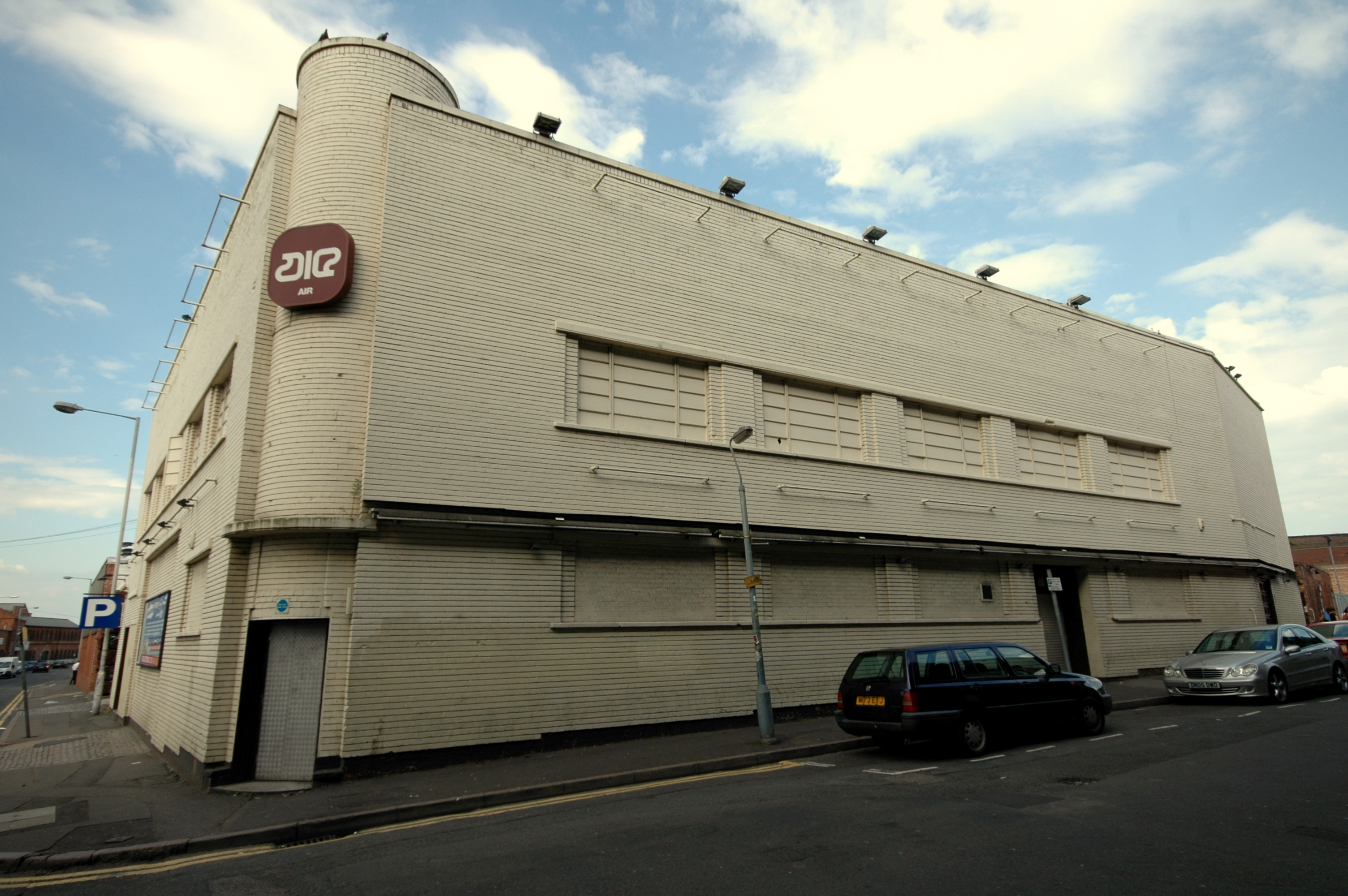
A view of the entrance to the nightclub on Heath Mill Lane.

AIR is a 2,000 capacity superclub located in Digbeth, Birmingham in England. AIR started as a spray shop for buses, when in 2000 the building was bought by Godskitchen and converted into a club, originally named CODE. In June 2003, CODE closed for a complete refit and reopened in late September 2003 under the new name of AIR. Improvements included an extra room of music being added to the two already in use (resulting in a lowered ceiling of the main room). Along with the club's name change, the three spaces inside were named the Oxygen Arena, the Nitrogen Room and the Carbon Lounge. The club features state-of-the-art lighting and sound systems. In 2002, Fergie (a resident DJ at the club for Godskitchen and Polysexual events in the early 2000s) said "It is one of the best [sound] systems I've ever played on, throughout the whole world".

In addition to Friday night's Godskitchen, AIR has hosted parties by Helter Skelter, Babooshka, Polysexual, Raveology, Hardcore Til I Die & Atomic Jam.

AIR is situated in an area of Digbeth synonymous with club culture, the "Custard Factory Quarter", named after the nearby Custard Factory, a centre for music and arts. Adjacent to the Custard Factory is the O2 Institute (formerly the Digbeth Institute), the original home of Godskitchen.

The 20-year lease contract originally taken out by Angel Music Group remains in place but, since 6 May 2012, the club has remained closed due to the slow demise of the Godskitchen brand caused mainly by a lack of direction and leadership and the high costs imposed by the Custard Factory landlords making it far cheaper to keep the doors closed than to open them.

The venue's owners Angel Music Group (also owners of Godskitchen and Global Gathering) ran two outdoor events utilising the car park area adjacent to its venue AIR in Birmingham in 2010 (Godskitchen Afresco) and again in 2012 (Godskitchen SixFiveTwelve). After the outdoor car park was successfully licensed by the then licensee and operations manager Nash Gooderham (when previous applicants had failed), both outdoor events were a success with capacities of 4000+ people and were arguably the first of their kind to take place in the city which set the precedence for similar events at other nearby venues. The 2012 event was the last time the venue was utilised before being closed and mothballed for almost a decade prior to the end of its lease with the Custard Factory.

Godskitchen has since moved to several venues including the O2 Institute, The Rainbow Warehouse textile factory and Boxxed in search of a new home for its brand and fanbase.

In early 2022, the UK dance music brand Ravers Reunited announced that they were to hold an event at the venue in conjunction with Clubland X-Treme, an offshoot of the original Clubland brand. This event was held on Sunday 1 May.

It has subsequently been announced that Ravers Reunited will hold their New Year's Eve event at the venue in 2022, entitled Ravers Reunited Presents AIR NYE.

Following the success of the above event ravers reunited are holding their 2023 Nye event there also.
