= Birmingham city centre =

Central business district in West Midlands, England

Coordinates: 52°28′40″N 1°53′40″W

- Central Business District
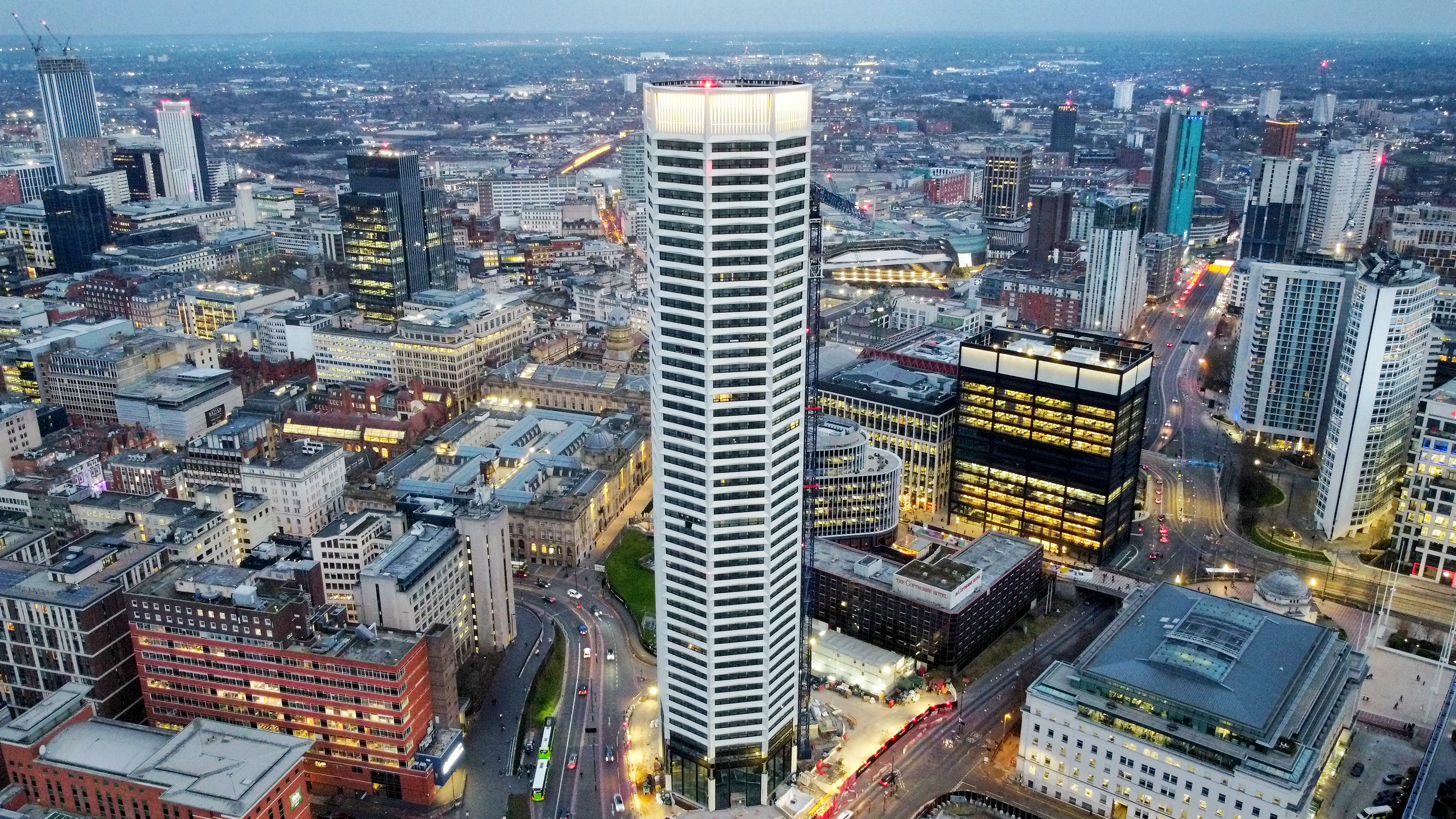
- A skyline view of Birmingham

- Location within
- Metropolitan borough: Birmingham
- Region: West Midlands
- Country: England
- Sovereign state: United Kingdom
- Post town: Birmingham
- Postcode district: B1 B2 B3 B4
- Dialling code: 0121
- Ambulance: West Midlands

Birmingham city centre, also known as Central Birmingham, is the central business district of Birmingham, England. The area was historically in Warwickshire. Following the removal of the Inner Ring Road, the city centre is now defined as being the area within the Middleway ring road. In recent years the city centre has been undergoing significant redevelopment with the Big City Plan, which means there are now nine emerging districts and the city centre is approximately five times bigger.

Historically the area was in Warwickshire, on the border with Worcestershire. Until around the Industrial Revolution, "Birmingham" referred only to what is now called the city centre. It was used to describe other areas when Birmingham absorbed surrounding towns.

== Districts ==
- City centre core
- Westside
- Eastside
- Southside
- Jewellery Quarter
- Gun Quarter
- Highgate
- Ladywood
- Digbeth

== History ==
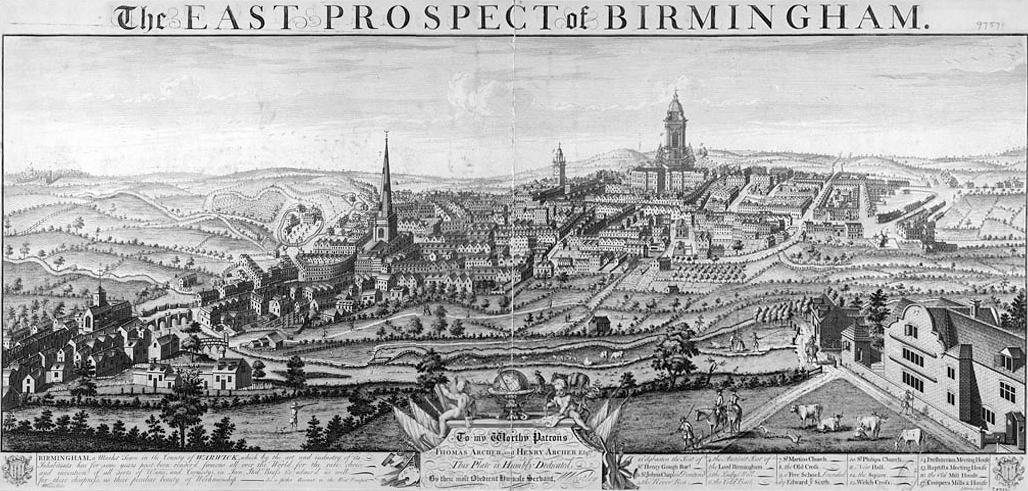
Birmingham in 1732; all of the area seen is now located within the city centre.

Following the removal of the Inner Ring Road, which acted as a "concrete collar" "under which pedestrians would be forced to walk through intimidating, dark and stinking underpasses" and prevented the expansion of the city centre, a massive urban regeneration project known as the Big City Plan has begun.

== Geography ==
Running through the city centre is the Birmingham Fault, a sandstone ridge. The "High Places" document produced and published by Birmingham City Council encouraged the construction of highrise buildings on the ridge.

== City centre core ==
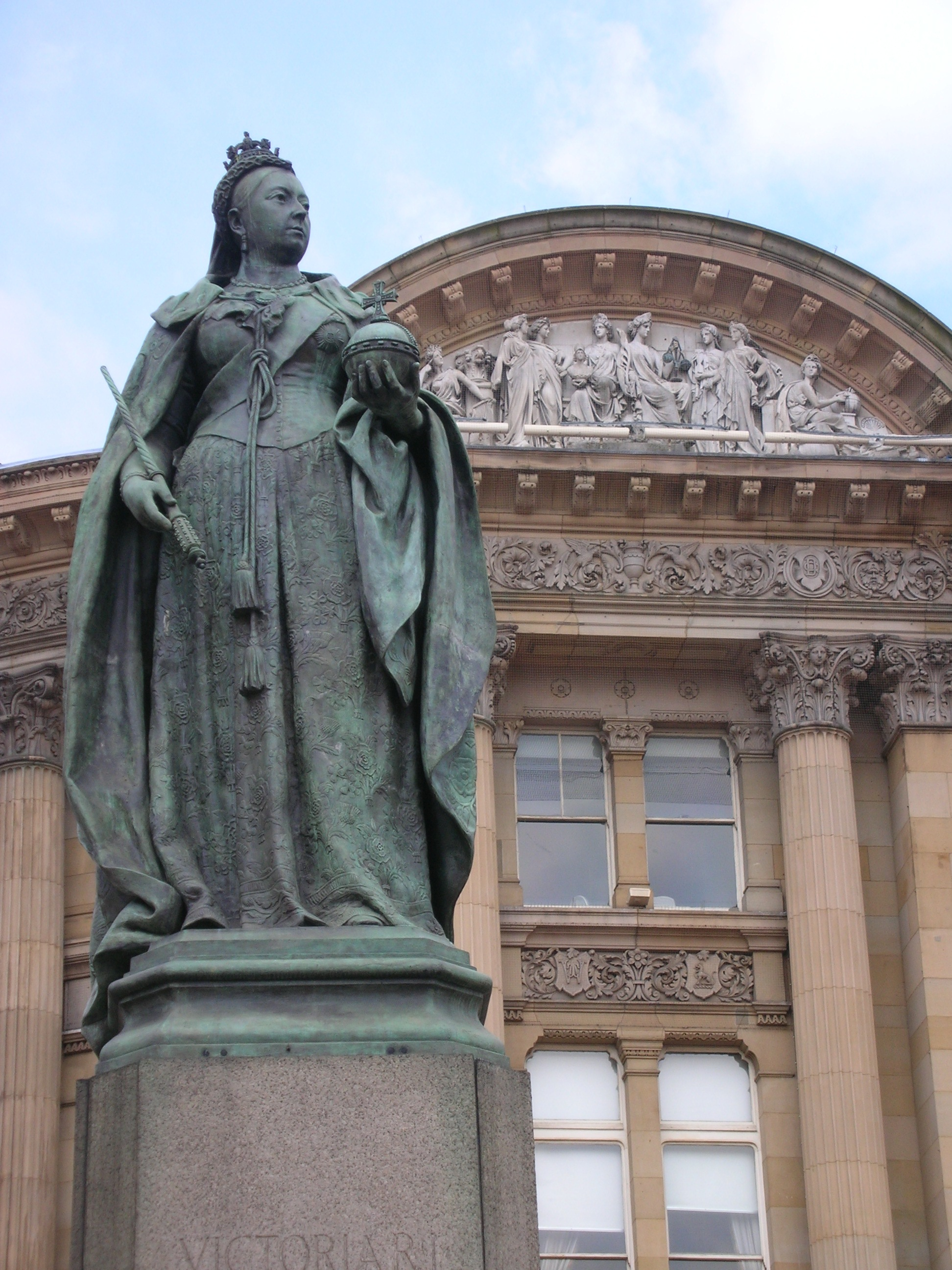
Statue of Queen Victoria in Victoria Square

The city centre core is the historic heart of the city, where old and new features are juxtaposed, roughly bounded by the former Birmingham Inner Ring Road. Its pre-eminent features include Chamberlain Square, Old Square, Victoria Square, Birmingham Town Hall, Birmingham Museum and Art Gallery, Birmingham Central Library, St Philip's Cathedral, Methodist Central Hall, Victoria Law Courts and other Birmingham Law Courts.

== Places of interest ==
The city centre contains many tourist destinations as well as landmarks. Brindleyplace, a regeneration scheme by Argent Group PLC, regenerated an area of derelict warehouses alongside canals near Broad Street. Brindleyplace consists of three public squares, offices, retail units and the Sea Life Centre. Oozells Street Board School was refurbished to become the Ikon Gallery. On the opposite side of Broad Street Tunnel on the canal network is Gas Street Basin. Nearby is also the International Convention Centre and Birmingham Symphony Hall, which is considered one of the best performance venues in the world. This overlooks Centenary Square and is adjacent to the Birmingham Repertory Theatre. Centenary Square was redeveloped in 1989 and given its current name in that year. A further redevelopment took place between 2017 and 2019, which included the addition of a large water feature. Within Centenary Square is the Hall of Memory and Baskerville House.

Other public squares in the city centre include Victoria Square, Chamberlain Square and Old Square. There are two public squares within the Bull Ring complex and another in the Custard Factory.

Retail is mainly focused on the Bullring Shopping Centre, Corporation Street, New Street and High Street. Other retail centres in the city centre are The Mailbox on Suffolk Street and Grand Central Shopping Centre above New Street station. Great Western Arcade is one of several arcades in the city centre. Digbeth is the focus for many independent retailers. Broad Street is the main centre for Birmingham's nightlife. There are further nightclubs in Digbeth.

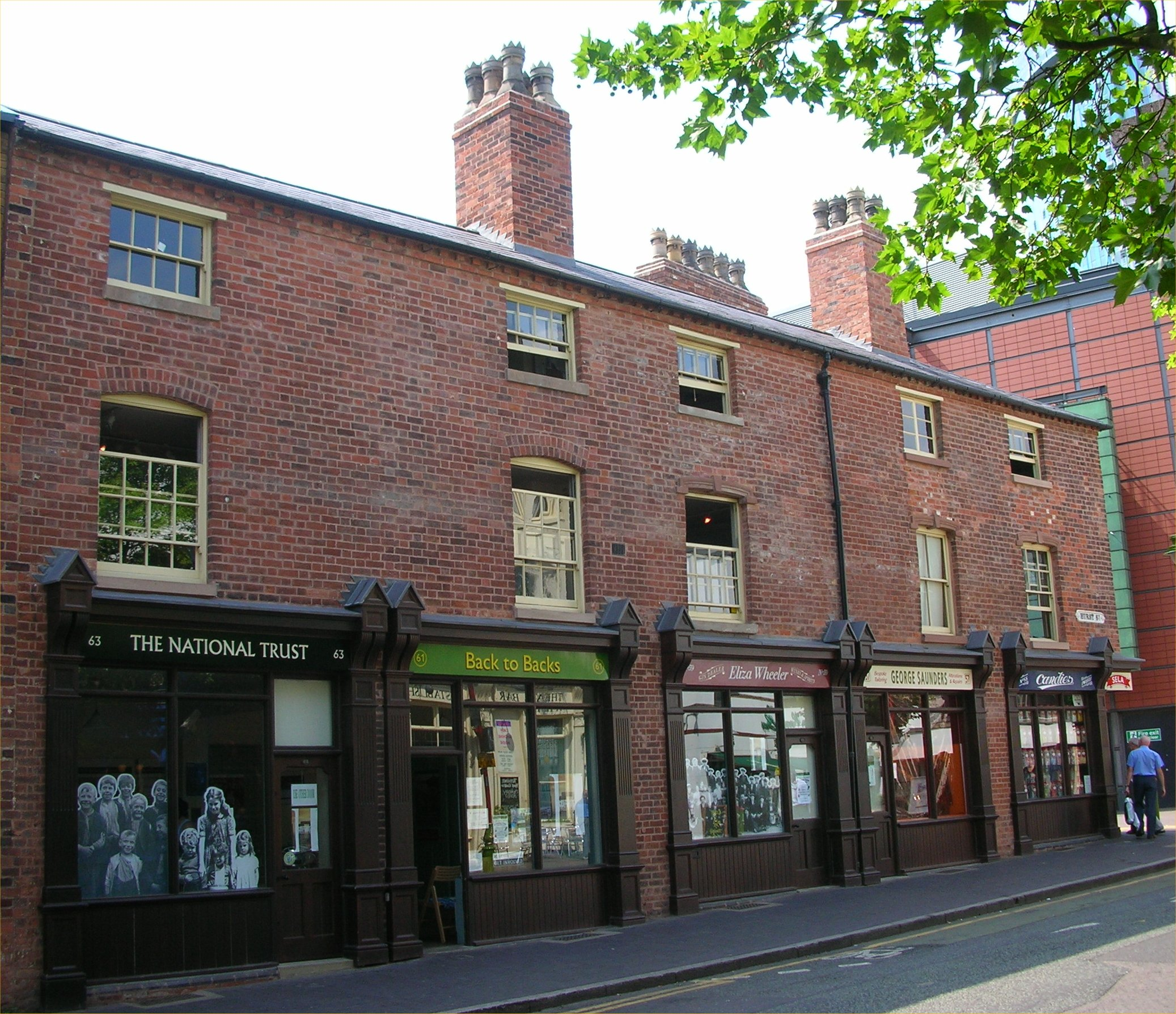
Birmingham Back to Backs on Hurst Street

Cultural attractions include Birmingham Central Library in Chamberlain Square and Birmingham Museum & Art Gallery and the Council House, Birmingham in the same building together with the clock tower, Big Brum. Thinktank opened in the Millennium Point complex in Eastside in 2002, replacing the Museum of Science and Industry on Newhall Street. The history of the Jewellery Quarter is documented in the Museum of the Jewellery Quarter. Also in the Jewellery Quarter is the Royal Birmingham Society of Artists and St. Paul's Gallery. A group of back-to-back houses on Hurst Street were restored by the National Trust. The Birmingham Back to Backs are the last surviving court of back to back houses in the city.

Colmore Row is the centre of the Colmore Row and Environs Conservation Area which consists of St. Philip's Cathedral. The Jewellery Quarter is also covered by a conservation area. Other quarters in the city centre are Birmingham Chinatown, Irish Quarter and Learning and Technology Quarter.

== Education ==
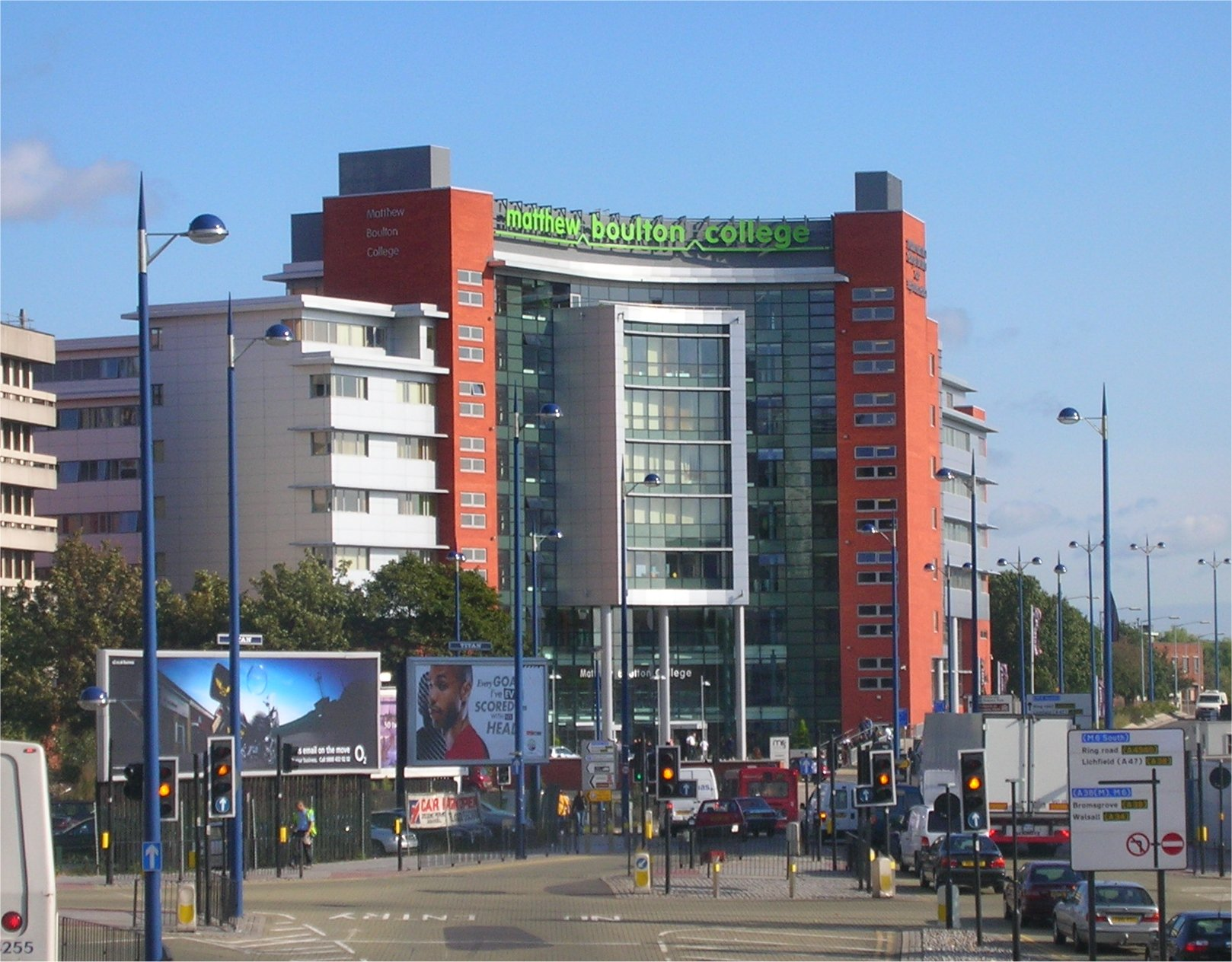
Matthew Boulton College

Aston University is based in the city centre whilst Birmingham City University has educational facilities there. In the Eastside area are Birmingham Metropolitan College's Matthew Boulton College campus and BMC's New Technology Institute. Birmingham Ormiston Academy is also located on the edge of the centre, next door to the Royal Birmingham Conservatoire. The area is sometimes called Aston Triangle.

Round this area are many high rise buildings providing student accommodation as well as high rise educational buildings.

== Transport ==
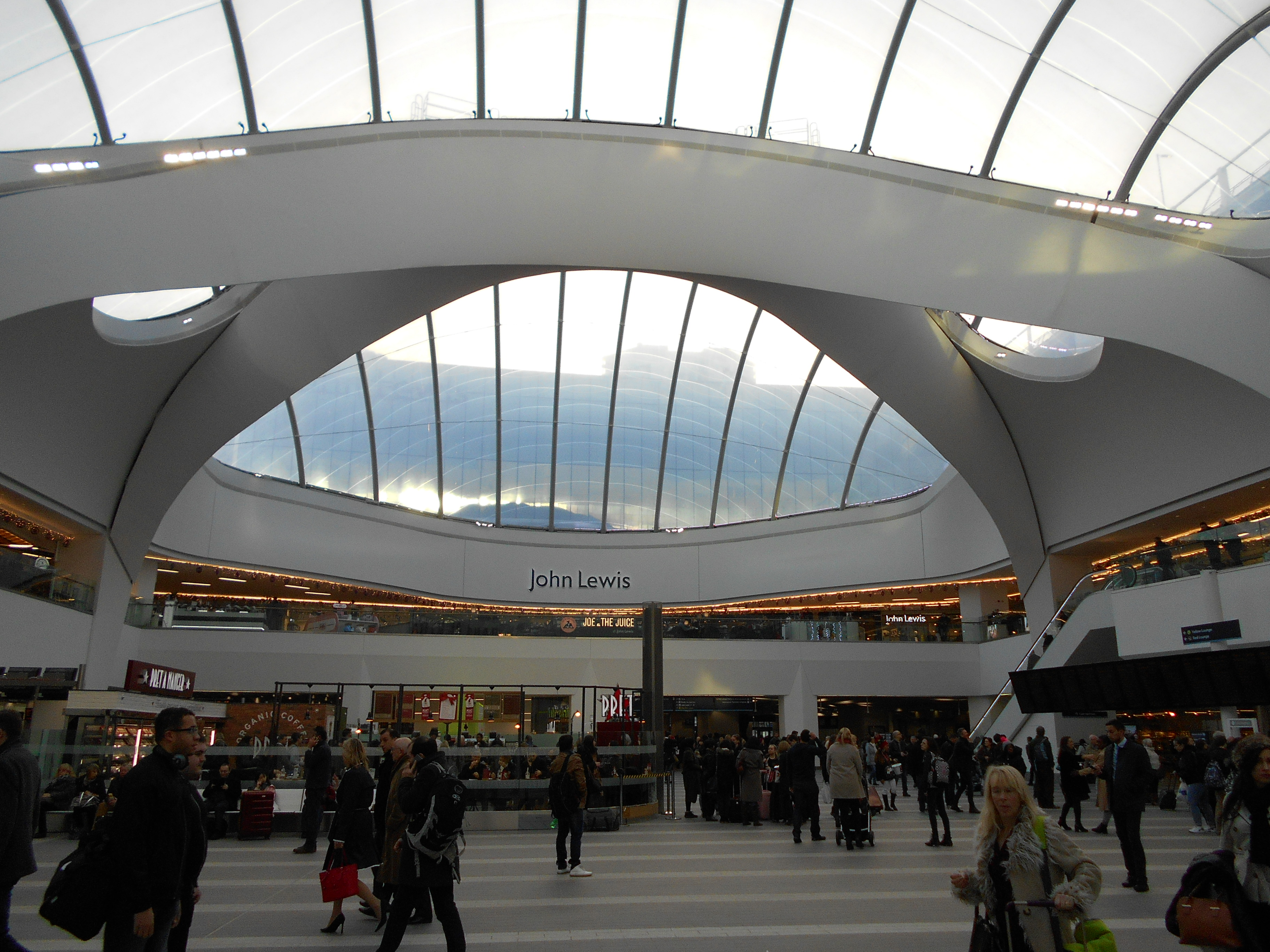
The regenerated New Street station, completed in 2016, cost £600m.

New Street station is the main railway station in the city centre with local and national railway connections, and is the busiest railway station outside of London. The station was first built in 1854 and rebuilt in 1967. The redevelopment of the station in a project named Gateway Plus was finished in 2016. The project cost £600m and included a new John Lewis department store and many other shops. The project took five years to build and is one of the most expensive and controversial regenerations in all of Europe. Moor Street, Snow Hill, Bordersley and Jewellery station are also located within the city centre. Eleven suburban and Inter-City heavy rail routes service the city centre. The first railway station to be built in the city centre was Curzon Street railway station, which acted as the terminus for both the London and Birmingham Railway and the Grand Junction Railway, with lines connecting Birmingham to London and to Manchester and Liverpool respectively. The building, designed by Philip Hardwick, was built in 1838 and is Grade I listed.

The West Midlands Metro system, opened in 1999, terminates at Edgbaston Village and has stops at Millennium Point, Bull Street, St Chads, St Paul's, Jewellery Quarter, Grand Central, Centenary Square, and Five Ways. Extensions are currently under construction to Dudley and Digbeth. In 2007, construction of a new viaduct to carry the Metro line over Great Charles Street Queensway commenced. The viaduct was built by the developers of Snowhill, adjacent to Snow Hill station. Birmingham city centre used to have a trolleybus system in the 19th century and early-20th century which extended towards the suburbs.

The trolleybus system was replaced by motor buses and the city centre is now the hub for the bus system in the city. The buses mainly terminate at Bull Street, Corporation Street and Moor Street, Queensway. The majority of these buses are operated by National Express West Midlands. The city centre is also the hub for the national coach network. Birmingham Coach Station, which is currently in the process of being prepared for redevelopment, is owned and operated by National Express who are to move their headquarters to the city. It was built by Midland Red in 1929, and until 1997 was also used by Midland Red West as a depot. The shed to the rear of the coach station has been demolished and Spencer House, the office building above the main waiting room, has been boarded up. A planning application for the refurbishment of the building has been submitted and is awaiting planning permission. A temporary coach station on the opposite side of the road is currently being used.

Cars are not officially encouraged in the city centre. Some areas have been pedestrianised to prevent cars interfering with pedestrian traffic, and some roundabouts with pedestrian subway systems have been replaced with signal-controlled junctions, e.g. on Smallbrook Queensway, Moor St Queensway, James Watt Queensway and St Chad's Circus near St Chad's Cathedral. However, there are still the remnants of the Birmingham Inner Ring Road (Queensway) in existence despite much demolition and downgrading, with a de facto heavily trafficked "half-ring" with vehicular underpasses for through traffic on St Chads Queensway, Great Charles St Queensway and Suffolk St Queensway. Some at-grade pedestrian crossings go over these roads, but most remain subways or bridges. This "half-ring" does arguably reduce traffic in other parts of the city centre, however.

There are numerous multi-storey car parks located within the city centre, most owned by private companies. A new multi-storey car park is proposed at the rear of Millennium Point whilst the demolition of the multi-storey car park on Dale End has been granted permission by the city council as part of the Martineau Galleries redevelopment by the Birmingham Alliance.
