= John Bowen (alderman) =

British businessman and alderman (1844-1926)

- Born: 16 December 1844
- Died: 16 April 1926 (aged 81)
- Occupation: Businessman

Alderman John Bowen JP (16 December 1844 – 16 April 1926) was a British businessman and was High Sheriff of Worcestershire.

Bowen's father was a blacksmith from Rochford, Worcestershire.

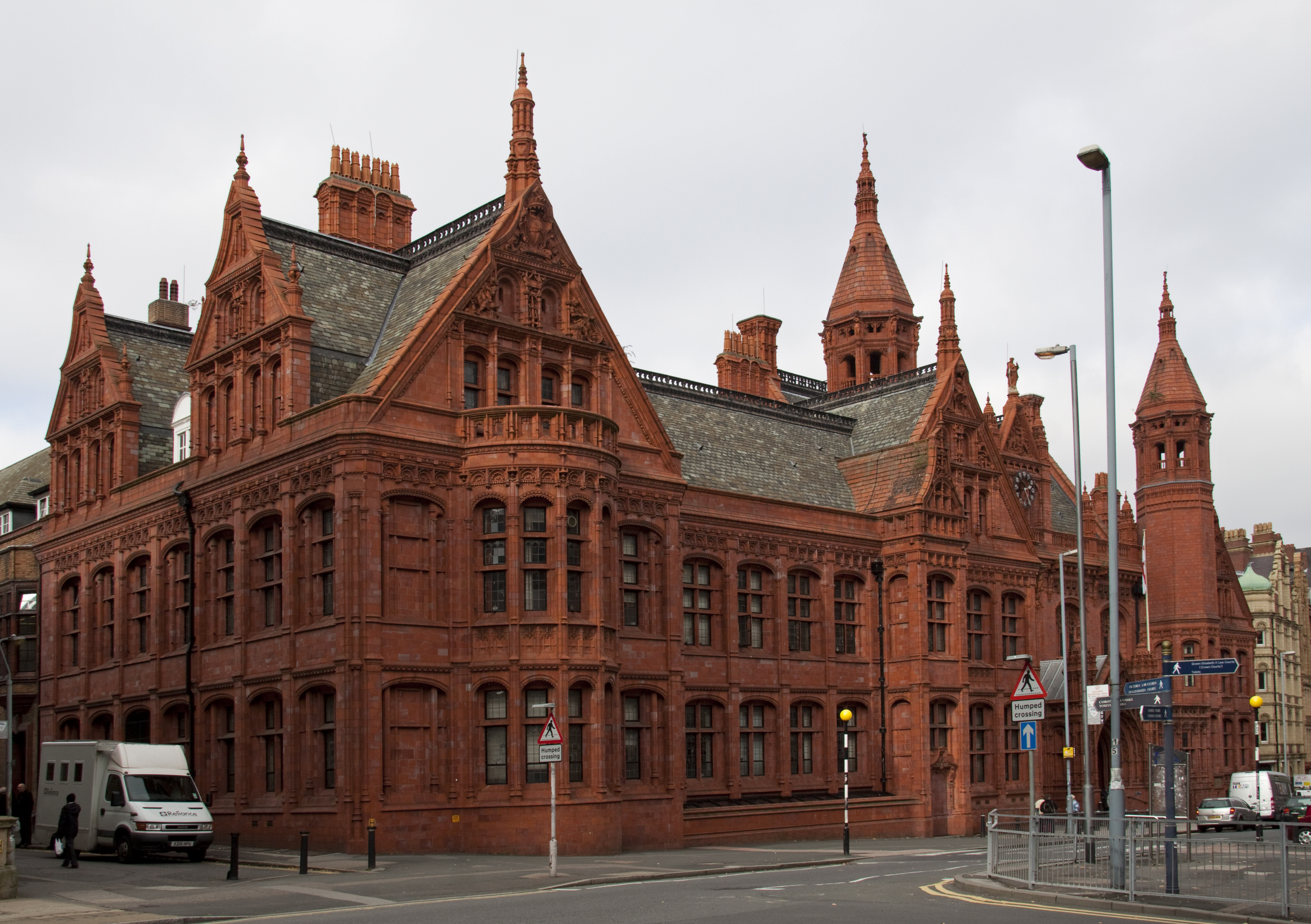
Victoria Law Courts in 2010

In 1875, he founded the firm of builders, John Bowen and Sons, in Birmingham, which was subsequently responsible for several notable buildings, not least Victoria Law Courts, and several others, on Corporation Street in that city.

He served as a magistrate in Worcestershire, was elected as an alderman for the county in 1892, and was High Sheriff of Worcestershire in 1916–17. Bowen is buried, with his second wife, at Brandwood End Cemetery.

In 2014 the Birmingham Civic Society unveiled a blue plaque in his honour, with the intention of affixing it to another of his buildings, a school now known as The Ark Academy in Tindal Street, in the city's Balsall Heath. The unveiling was attended by three High Sheriffs, for the West Midlands (Tim Watts), Powys (Philip Bowen), and Worcestershire (Michael Hogan), as well as Deputy Lord Lieutenant David Bradnock. Bowen once lived on Tindal Street, and later lived in Moseley, in a house called Rochford (52.45300°N 1.89298°W; since demolished), on Strensham Hill.

A biography, Alderman John Bowen J.P. 'Honest John' by Bowen's great-grandson, Anthony Collins, was published in 2014.
