= Digbeth Institute =

Music venue in Birmingham, England

Coordinates: 52°28′32.13″N 1°53′14.55″W

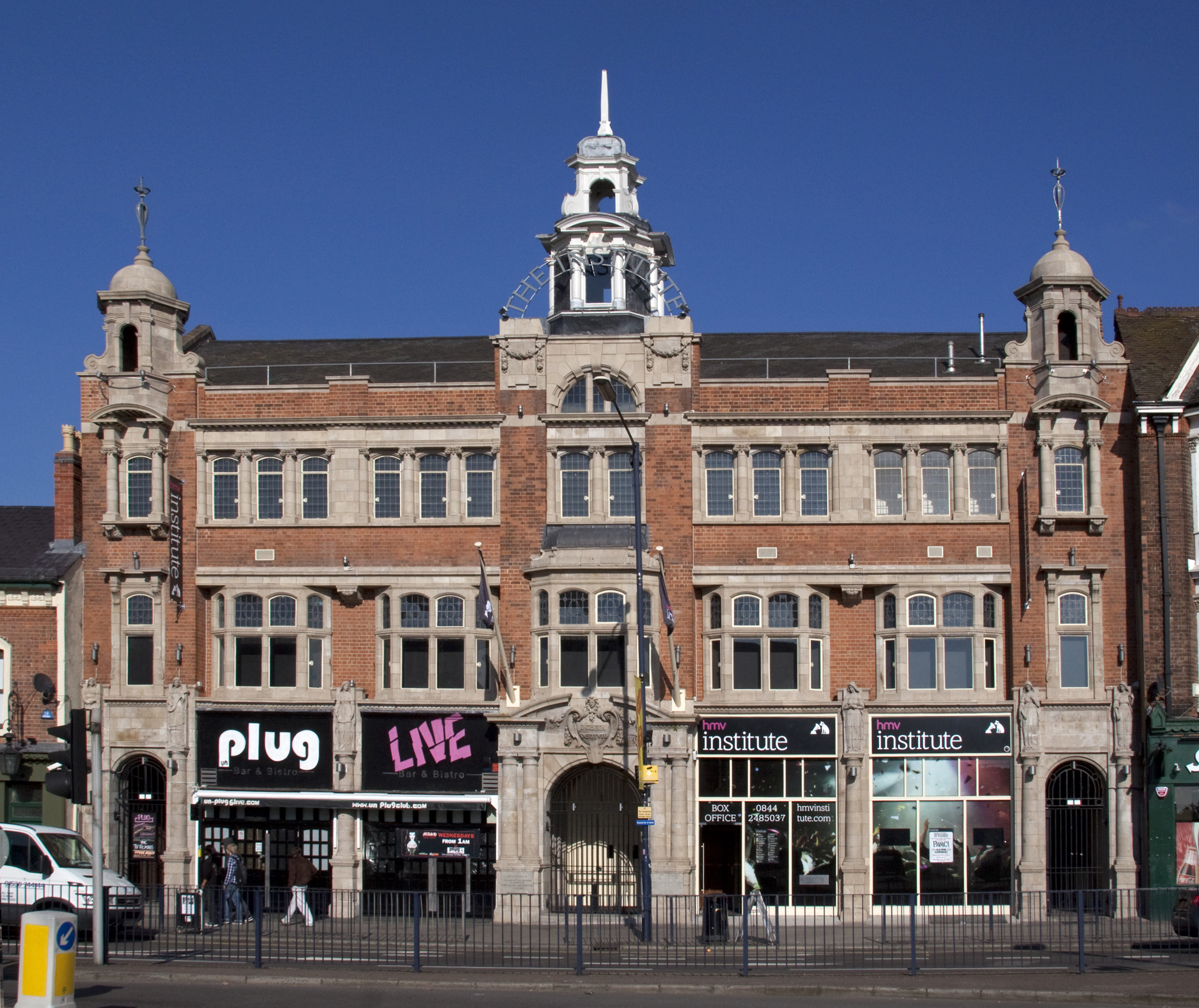
- Exterior of venue (c.2010)
- Interactive map of Digbeth Institute
- Full name: Digbeth Institute Birmingham
- Former names: Digbeth Institute (1908–55; 1990–98); Digbeth Civic Hall (1955–90); The Sanctuary (1998–2008); HMV Institute (2010–15)
- Address: 78 Digbeth High St; Birmingham B5 6DY; England
- Location: Digbeth
- Owner: Academy Music Group
- Operator: Live Nation
- Capacity: 1,500 (O2 Institute1); 600 (O2 Institute2); 250 (O2 Institute3)

Construction
- Groundbreaking: 1906
- Opened: 16 January 1908
- Renovated: 1957, 1985, 1997, 2008–10
- Architect: Arthur Harrison

Website
- Venue Website

The Digbeth Institute (currently known for sponsorship reasons as the O2 Institute) is a music venue located in Birmingham, England. The venue opened in 1908 as a mission of Carrs Lane Congregational Church. It has also served as an event centre, civic building and nightclub.

It has three main rooms: the 1,500-capacity main auditorium called O2 Institute1 (formerly "The Institute") which has two seated upper balcony levels, the downstairs room which holds up to 500 people called O2 Institute2 (formerly "The Library") and the 250-capacity upstairs room O2 Institute3 (formerly "The Temple").

The venue also used to house "Un-Plug", an intimate club with a capacity of 400, located in the building's cellar. The space formerly operated as the Midland Jazz Club, the Jug o' Punch Folk Club, the Dance Factory, and the Barfly.

== History ==
Designed by Arthur Harrison, it was officially opened 16 January 1908 by the wife of the Pastor of Carrs Lane Church, John Henry Jowett, as an institutional church associated with Carr's Lane Congregational Church. In the week that followed, it hosted a variety of acts. The area which surrounded it was predominantly slums and industrial buildings.

In 1954, the building was put up for sale by the trustees as they felt the building was not needed for its originally intended use. It was bought by Birmingham City Council in 1955 for £65,000 and was used as a civic hall. People known to have made speeches at the Digbeth Institute include Neville Chamberlain, Henry Usborne, Florence L. Barclay and Herbert Hensley Henson. The Church relocated to Yardley as Digbeth-in-the-Field Congregational Church.

In the late 1950s and early 1960s it housed the Midland Jazz club. Wrestling was held at the venue when it was known as Digbeth Civic Hall. Digbeth Civic Hall hosted the likes of Nusrat Fateh Ali Khan (1983). In 1987, the building was used as a film studio by the Birmingham Film and Video Workshop for the Channel 4 film 'Out of Order'. The venue also played a part as one of the main locations in the feature film 'Lycanthropy', filmed in 2005–06.

In the 1985 and 1997, the venue was refurbished. In 1998, "The Sanctuary" opened, which was to be the original home of the Cambridge/Northampton born club night event Godskitchen. It also played host to other events such as: Atomic Jam, Uproar, Slinky, Sundissential, Athletico, Ramshackle, Insurrection, Inukshuk and Panic.

In 2005, Channelfly Company bought the downstairs "cellar" room, and turned it into the Birmingham Barfly. This 400 capacity venue was host to touring bands and local bands. The MAMA Group acquired Channelfly as a subsidiary in 2006.

In 2008, the MAMA Group took over the lease of the whole building. Work was started on renovating the building, especially the historic features. The work was due to be finished in September 2009 (but was not completed until March 2010). In January 2009, HMV bought a 9.9% stake in The MAMA Group (by taking 50% of the Mean Fiddler). In January 2010 HMV bought the remaining percentage of the MAMA group for £46 million.

After a £4 million refurbishment, the HMV Institute opened on 18 September 2010.

In December 2012, HMV sold its assets to Lloyds Development Capital (LDC) for under £8 million. In 2015, the venue was acquired by Live Nation, and re-branded as O2 Institute Birmingham, as part of the O2 Academy Group.

== Naming history ==
- Digbeth Institute (16 January 1908–1955; August 1990–1998)
- Digbeth Civic Hall (1955–1990)
- The Institute (1990–1997)
- Sanctuary Nightclub (1998–2008)
- HMV Institute (18 September 2010–10 October 2015)
- O2 Institute (11 October 2015–present)

== Exterior ==
The exterior is a mixture of red brick and grey terracotta. The grey terracotta forms the more ornate features of the façade including the three towers, the 1.65-metre tall allegorical figures and the window and door frames. The six allegorical figures are believed to be the work of John Evans, the chief modeller for Gibbs & Canning. Two hold open books and two have musical instruments (a third's instrument is lost). The final figure holds a purse, representing public charity. The drawings of the building by Arthur Harrison do not include the figures, indicating that these were probably added in 1909. The building is Grade B locally listed.
