= Aston Triangle =

Area of Birmingham City Centre, England

Coordinates: 52.4860°N 1.8900°W

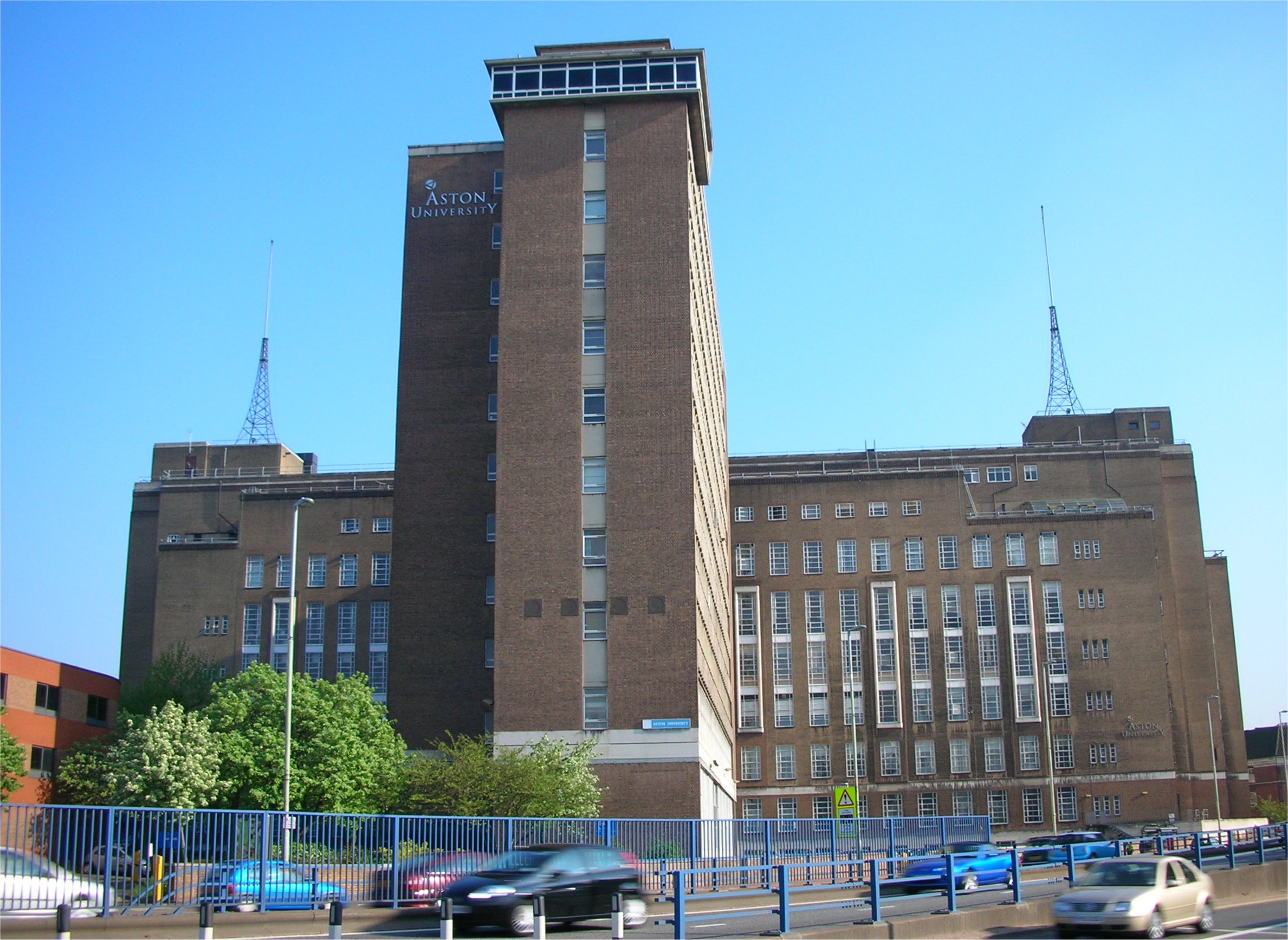
Aston University from the Aston Expressway

The Aston Triangle is an area of Birmingham City Centre, England. The area is mostly dominated by higher education facilities. Aston University is based within the Aston Triangle area and the logo of the establishment takes from the shape of the area. Birmingham City University also uses facilities on the Aston University campus. These are in Gosta Green together with Birmingham Institute of Art and Design and Aston Science Park. The site has large numbers of teaching buildings and student halls of residence, which are used by Aston University. Dalton, Lawrence, and Stafford Towers, three large towers containing student dwellings, were demolished in the early 2010s, and new student accommodation named the William Murdoch, the James Watt, the Harriet Martineau and the Mary Sturge Residences constructed.

The triangular headquarters of West Midlands Fire Service was located at Lancaster Circus. The building has been purchased by the Watkin Jones Group who have plans to construct a high rise building in the courtyard of the building. West Midlands Fire Service new headquarters are in Duddeston.
