= Gibbs and Canning =

English manufacturer of Terracotta founded in 1847

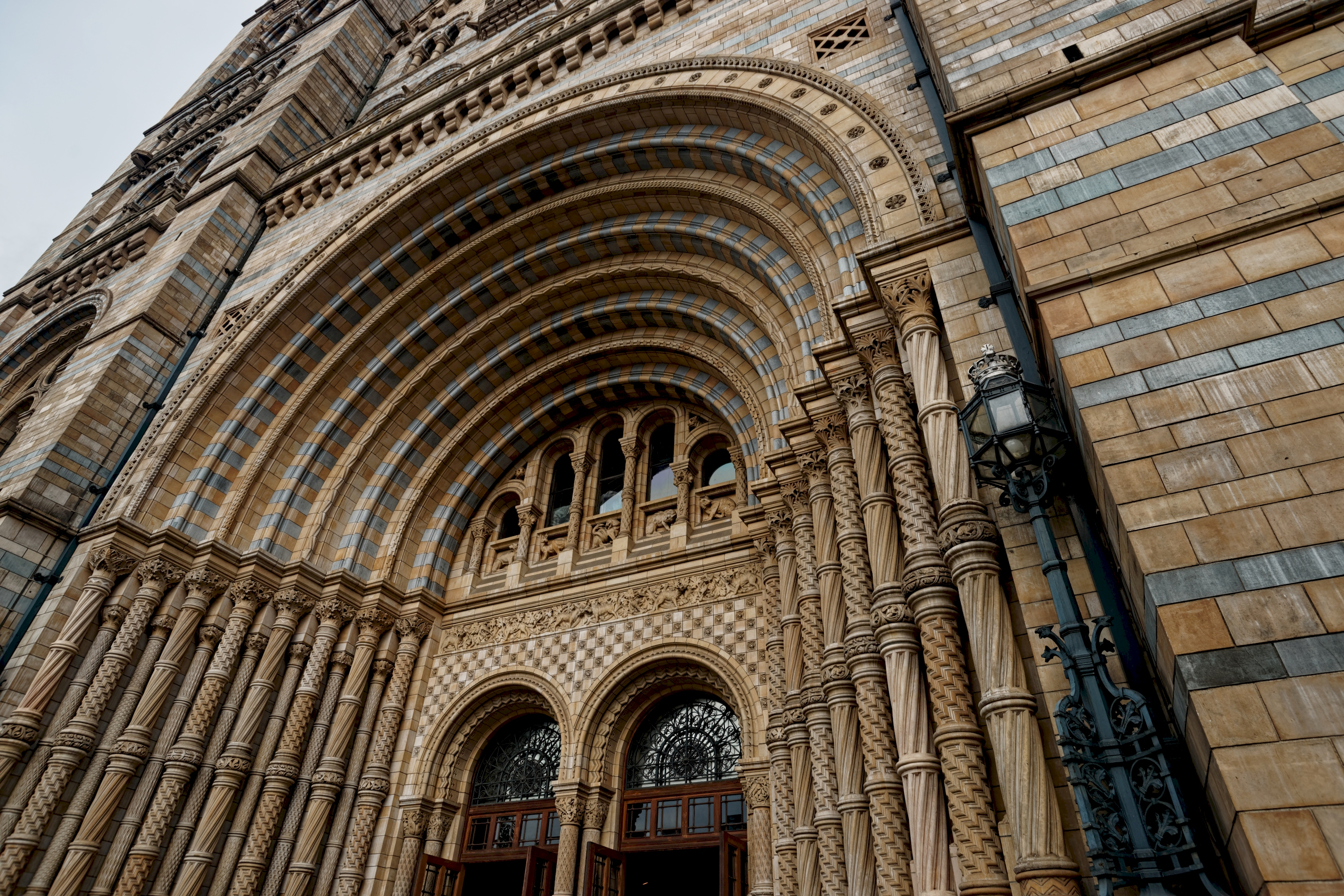
Main porch of the Natural History Museum, 1881, designed by Alfred Waterhouse

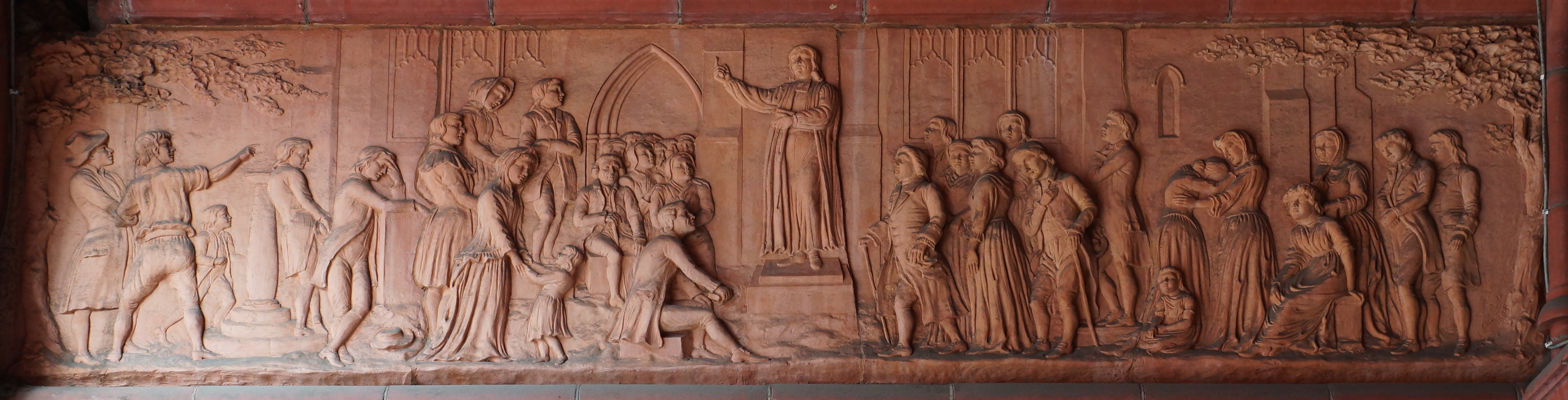
Events in the Life of John Wesley, porch of the Methodist Central Hall, Birmingham, c. 1900-1903

Gibbs and Canning Limited was an English manufacturer of terracotta and, in particular, architectural terracotta, located in Glascote, Tamworth, and founded in 1847.

The company manufactured a wide range of terracotta and faience: statues of lions and pelicans to adorn the Natural History Museum in London; architectural terracotta for banks and schools; and garden urns and planters. By the 1950s, when the factory closed, it was renowned for practical items like drainage pipes, sinks, vases, and jars.

Today, little remains of the factory in Glascote, but its legacy endures in the decoration and plumbing of numerous buildings across Britain's major towns and cities.

== Buildings featuring Gibbs and Canning terracotta ==
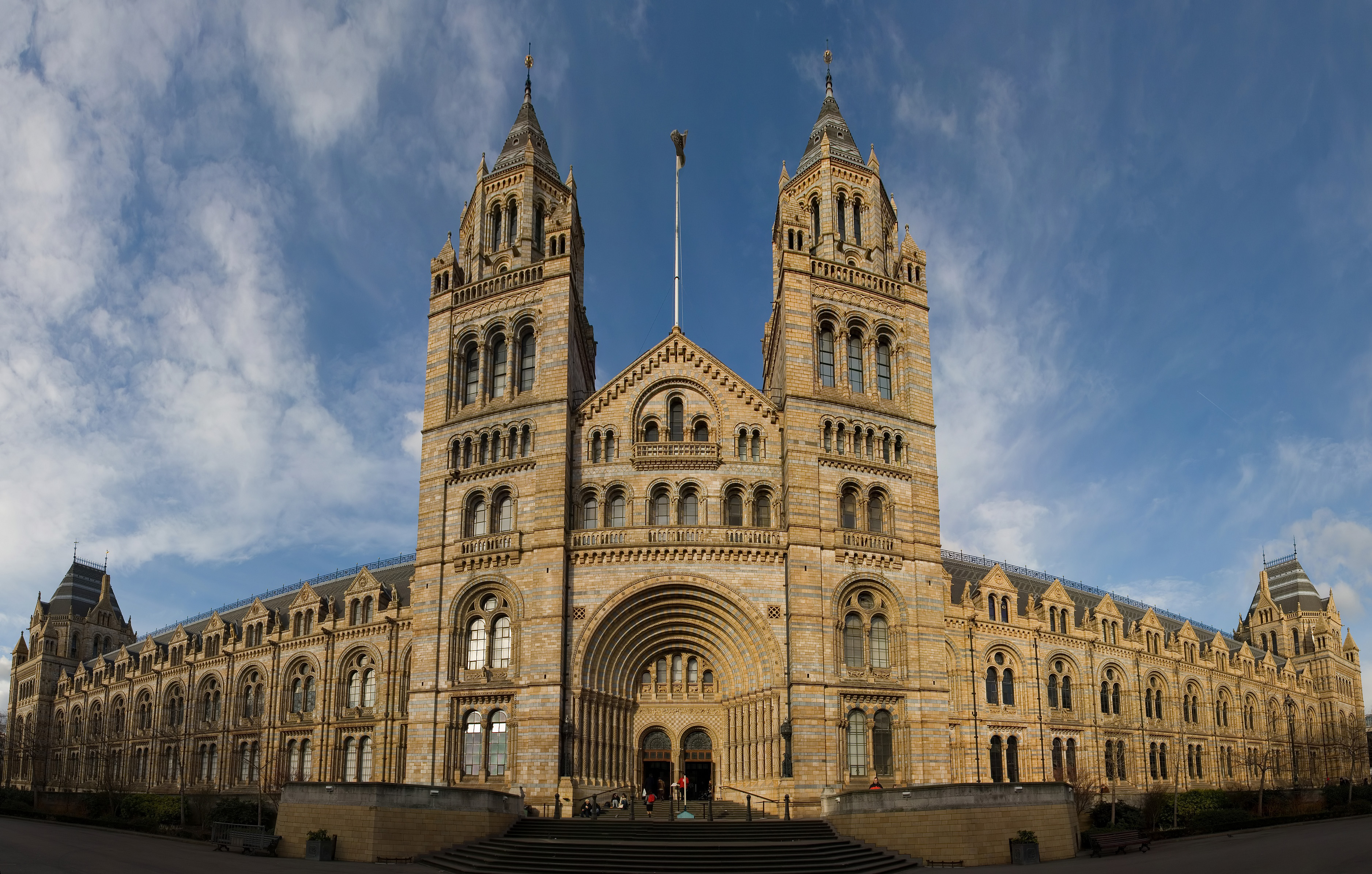
Natural History Museum London: Every stone and statue is thought to be by Gibbs and Canning inside and out. Living animals on the one wing, and the extinct on the other.

- Natural History Museum, South Kensington, London. Designed by Alfred Waterhouse. Both the interior and exterior statues, and the block-work, are Gibbs and Canning (G&C).
- Royal Albert Hall, South Kensington, London. The buff, ornamental terracotta on the exterior.
- 142 Holborn Bars, Prudential Assurance Building, Holborn, London. Designed by Alfred Waterhouse with all the red terracotta by G&C.
- Methodist Central Hall, Birmingham. Ornate, red terracotta.
- Imperial Buildings, Victoria Street/Whitechapel corner, Liverpool, 1879. Cream terracotta.
- Church of the Holy Name of Jesus, Manchester. Roof vaulting of hollow terracotta blocks, 1869–71.
- Manchester Town Hall Designed, again by Alfred Waterhouse.
- Victoria Law Courts, Birmingham. Interior buff-coloured terracotta.
