= Superclub =

Very large nightclub

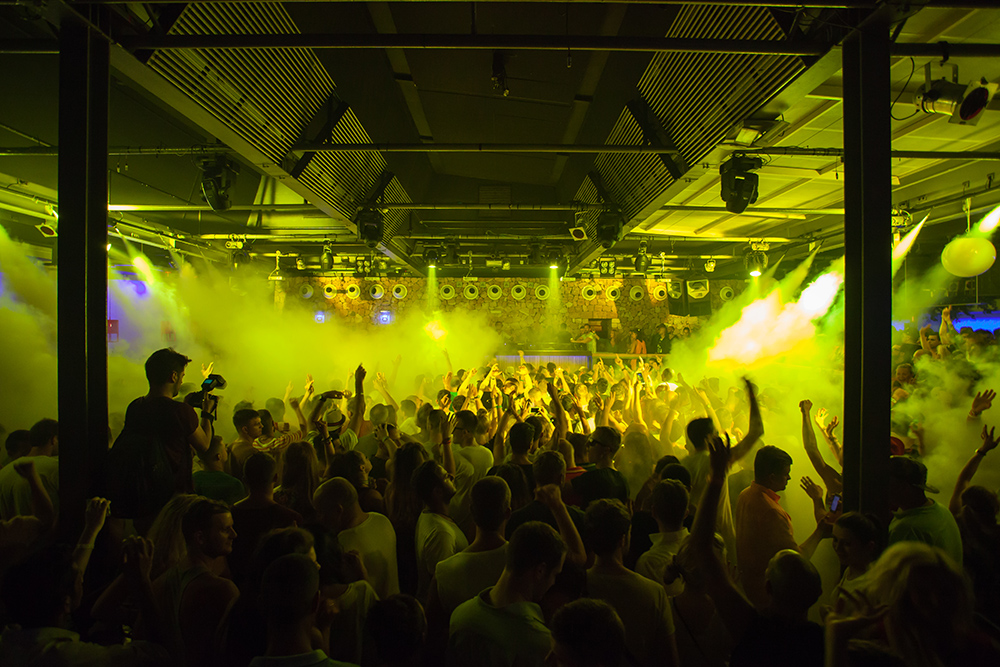
Space Ibiza

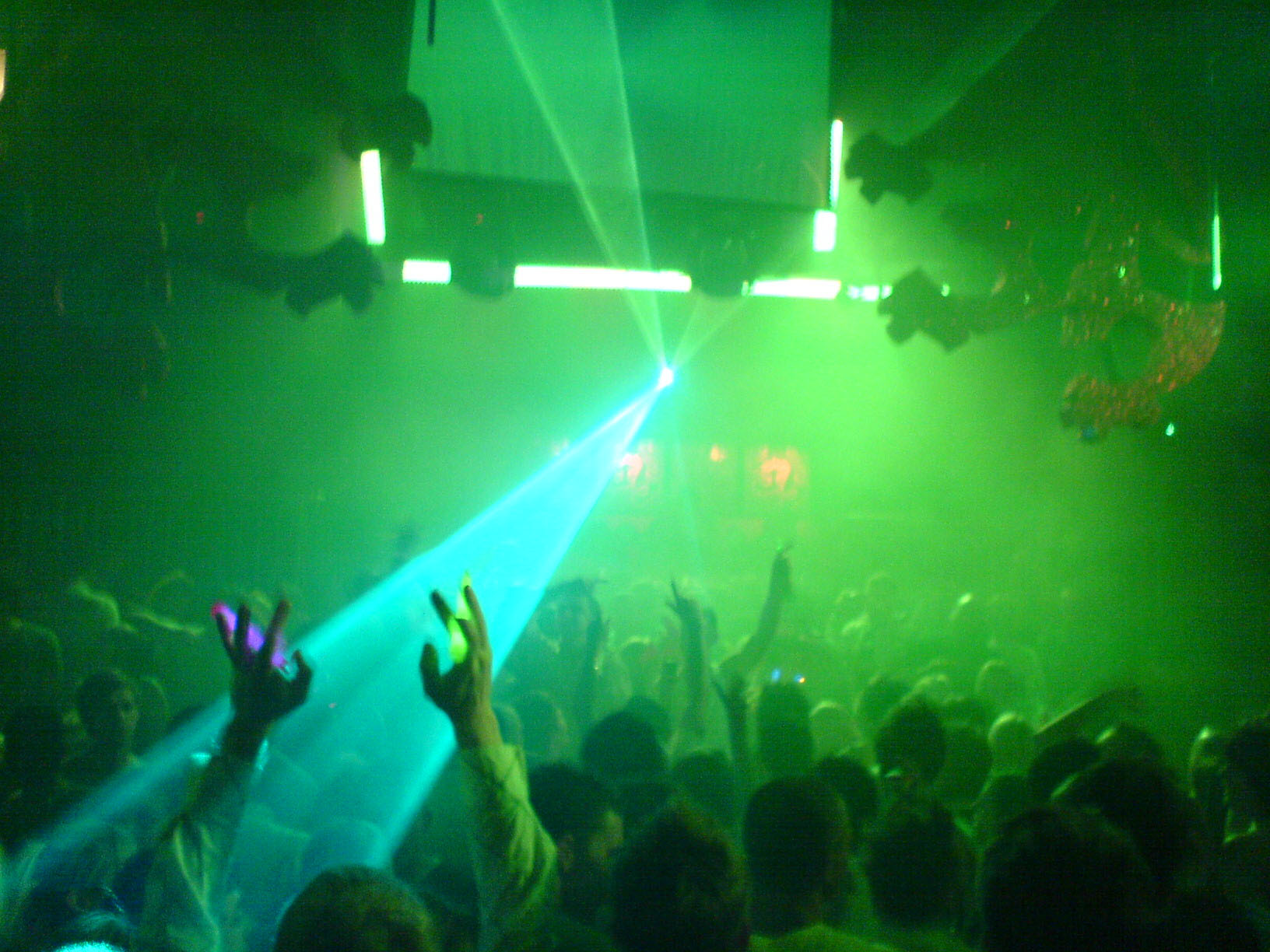
Laser lights illuminate the dance floor at a Gatecrasher dance music event in Sheffield, England

A superclub is a very large or superior nightclub, often with several rooms with different themes. The term was coined in Mixmag, the British electronic dance and clubbing magazine, in 1995, referring to the new wave of clubs such as Ministry of Sound and Cream, which were dominating the English club scene, although the term has retrospectively been used to refer to large or significant clubs before this time.

Superclubs may include nightclubs that have high capacity, or are multi-story, high profile, and operate city- and region-wide. Some superclubs are owned and managed by a dance music record label or a club that was or is culturally important. The term may also be used to define its position within the club scene hierarchy.

UNVRS in Ibiza is the "world's largest nightclub" according to the Guinness Book of Records, with a capacity of 10,000 people.

== History ==
Forerunners of contemporary superclubs already existed in the early 20th century. The Guardian describes the Moka Efti in Berlin, a major dancing establishment of the Golden Twenties, as a "1920s superclub".

== Superclubs by decade ==
The following lists group superclubs by the date they were first established.

=== 1960s ===
Early examples of superclubs include Annabel's (London, 1963), Blow Up (Munich, 1967) and Pacha (Sitges, 1967).

=== 1970s ===
Examples of superclubs from this period include Pacha, Ibiza in (1973), Studio One (nightclub) Los Angeles (1975), BANG (club) London (1976), Amnesia, Ibiza, (1976), Studio 54, New York City, (1977), Paradise Garage, New York, (1977), Ku Club Ibiza, (1978), Xenon, New York, (1978), Roxy NYC, New York, (1978), Dorian Gray, Frankfurt, (1978), Heaven London, (1979), Danceteria, New York, (1979)

=== 1980s ===
Examples of superclubs from this period include The Saint in New York in (1980), The Fridge, London, (1981), The Haçienda in Manchester opened in (1982), The Limelight, New York, (1983), Hippodrome, London, (1983), Space, Ibiza, (1986), Tunnel, New York, (1986), Palladium, New York, (1985), Quadrant Park, Liverpool, (1988), Excalibur Nightclub, Chicago, (1989), The Sound Factory, New York, (1989), The Venue, Tower Park Poole, (1989).

=== 1990s ===
Examples of superclubs from this period include Trade at Turnmills, London, (1990), Club 051, Liverpool (1991), Ministry of Sound in London (1991), Bagley's, London (1991), Juliana's Tokyo, (1991), Zouk, Singapore, (1991), Renaissance (1992), Avalon, Boston (1992), Bunker, Berlin, (1992), E-Werk, Berlin, (1993), G-A-Y, London, (1993), Cream at Nation, Liverpool, (1993), Miss Moneypenny's, Birmingham, (1993), Cavo Paradiso, Mykonos, (1993),Ultraschall, Munich, (1994), Twilo, New York, (1995), The End, London, (1995), Nation, Washington, D.C., (1995), The Emporium. Coalville, (1995), Privilege, Ibiza, (1995), Gatecrasher One, (1996), Godskitchen, (1996), KW – Das Heizkraftwerk, Munich, (1996), The Church, Denver (1996), Fabric, London (1999), DC10, Ibiza, (1999), Home, London, (1999)

=== 2000s ===
Examples of superclubs from this period include Womb, Tokyo, (2000), Bungalow 8, New York City, (2001), Hakkasan, Las Vegas, (2001), Vision Club, Chicago, (2002), Vanguard LA, Hollywood, (2002), SeOne, London, (2002), Berghain, Berlin, (2003), Cielo, New York, (2003), Opium Garden Miami, (2003), AIR, Birmingham, (2003), Crobar, Chelsea, New York, (2003), Sound Bar, Chicago, (2004), Myth, Minneapolis, (2005), TAO, Las Vegas, (2005), 1015 Folsom Nightclub, San Francisco, (2005), Belo, (San Diego), (2006), XS Nightclub, Las Vegas, (2008), Marquee Nightclub and Dayclub, Las Vegas, (2010), Omnia, Las Vegas (2015) (formerly, Pure, (2004)), Marquee Nightclub, Singapore, (2018), KAOS Dayclub and Nightclub, Las Vegas, (2019).

=== 2010s ===
Examples of superclubs from this period include: Echostage, Washington D.C., (2012), Output, New York City, (2013), White Dubai @ Meydan, (2013), MMA Club, Munich (2014), Bassiani, Tbilisi, (2014), Laroc, São Paulo, (2015), Printworks, London (2017), Kompass klub, Ghent. Student Society in Trondheim, Trondhjem Norway, (2024).

== Culturally important clubs ==
The clubs listed here do not necessarily meet the criteria for the spatial definition of a "superclub" but are included for their significant cultural importance:

- Peppermint Lounge, New York City (1958),
- UFO Club, London (1960's)
- The Loft, New York City, (1970),
- The Warehouse, Chicago, (1977)
- Mudd Club, New York, (1978)
- Billy's, London (1978)
- Blitz Club, London, (1979)
- Pyramid Club, New York, (1979)
- Club 57, New York, (1979)
- Camden Palace, London, (1982)
- The Batcave, London (1982)
- Taboo, London, (1985)
- The World, New York, (1986)
- Kinky Gerlinky, London, (1989)
- Tresor, Berlin, (1991)
- Trade (1990-2008)
- Vague Club, Leeds, (1993)
- B 018, Beirut, (1994).

== Album ==
Cream, Gatecrasher and Pacha teamed up in 2010 to produce the album Superclub. Released on 22 November in the UK, the three-CD collection has one disc for each of the clubs and was the first release from Rhino UK's dance imprint One More Tune. A second album, called Superclub Ibiza, was released in July 2011 by EMI.

== See also ==
- Nightclub
- List of electronic dance music venues

== Sources ==
- Bibby, Michael; Goodlad, Lauren M. E. (21 March 2007). Goth: Undead Subculture. Duke University Press. ISBN 0822389703.
- Cohen, edited by Philip; Rustin, Michael J. (2008). London's turning : Thames Gateway-prospects and legacy. Aldershot, Hampshire, England: Ashgate. ISBN 9780754670636.
- Gerstner, David A., (2012), Routledge International Encyclopedia of Queer Culture. Routledge, ISBN 9781136761812.
- Hsalam, Dave, (2015), Life After Dark: A History of British Nightclubs & Music Venues, Simon and Schuster, ISBN 9780857207005.
- Lau, Stella Sai-Chun (2012). Popular Music in Evangelical Youth Culture. Cambridge, England,: Routledge. p. 174. ISBN 9780415888219.
- Niemitz, Brian (2006). Night+Day New York. ASDavis Media Group. ISBN 9780976601319.
- O'Reilly, Daragh; Kerrigan, Finola (27 April 2010). Marketing the Arts: A Fresh Approach. Routledge. ISBN 9781136995019.
- Richardson, Diane; Seidman, Steven (18 November 2002). Handbook of Lesbian and Gay Studies. SAGE. ISBN 9780761965114.
- Robinson, Roxy, (2016), Music Festivals and the Politics of Participation, Routledge. ISBN 9781317091998.
