= Quadrant Park =

Former nightclub in Liverpool, Merseyside

Coordinates: 53.44987°N 3.00102°W

- Quaddie
- Interactive map of Quadrant Park
- Address: Derby Road in Bootle, north of the city of Liverpool, in a converted warehouse
- Location: Bootle, England
- Capacity: 2,400
- Type: Club
- Events: acid house, Italo house, Techno, electronic dance music

Construction
- Opened: 1988
- Closed: December 31, 1991

Website
- QuadrantParkReunions.com

Quadrant Park also known as the Quad or Quaddie was a nightclub in Bootle, UK opened during the late 1980s to the early 1990s. and one of the most important in the UK at the time. and was known to attract a number of international guest DJs. The main styles of music played were Italo house and acid house, retrospectively it could also be defined an early Superclub.

== History ==
The nightclub was located on Derby Road in Bootle, north of the city of Liverpool, in a converted warehouse. The building was originally an Owen Owen warehouse, which was purchased by steel magnate James Spencer in the late 1980s to convert into a nightclub and snooker hall. A "Heritage Market" was opened shortly after to make use of the large unused lower floor space at the rear. Originally opened in the late 1980s as a snooker hall and mainstream nightclub, there was also a market in the downstairs warehouse area, and the upstairs contained a small social club (the Harlequin Suite) which could be hired out for social occasions. After the Sunday market trade had moved to a nearby dock warehouse (Stanley Market), Quadrant Park started holding all night raves in the then-vacant space. A loop-hole in a Sefton council licensing law enabled Quadrant Park to be the only legal all-night rave in the UK, as the venue did not sell alcohol. Quadrant Park's main period of activity began in early January 1990 with a capacity of 2,400, Quadrant Park began focusing on house music in early 1990. The club was dubbed "The Quad" and in October 1990 it opened the Pavilion, the first weekly legal all-nighter in Britain. Pavilion was put on in the basement below the main club. Some party goers would travel long distances to get to the venue; from London, Glasgow, Birmingham and even as far away as Aberdeen. Near the end of 1990, the club obtained a licence to stay open to six o'clock.

== DJs ==
Mike Knowler was the initial resident DJ, and soon invited DJ partner Andy Carroll to join him. Carroll and Knowler had previously helped bring acid house music to the city of Liverpool, DJing at The State nightclub in Dale Street. When the all-nighter opened in November 1990, John Kelly, James Barton and Gary J joined the resident DJ crew. Guest DJs at Quadrant Park included Laurent Garnier, Derrick May, Frankie Bones, Fabio, Grooverider, Rob Tissera, Trevor Fung, Joey Beltram and Sasha. Knowler was given the Thursday night gig in January 1990, and was later also given the residency of the club's Friday and Saturday nights.

== Live PAs ==
A number of live performances at Quadrant Park included: Guru Josh, Anticappella, Baby D, Baby Ford, Bassomatic, Bizarre Inc, Dream Frequency, Jam MCs, K-Klass, Katherine E, LFO, N-Joi, Mr Monday, Nightmares on Wax, and Shades of Rhythm.

== Closure ==
The club survived until 31 December 1991, despite considerable and persistent licensing issues and unfavourable media attention in newspapers. Quadrant Park closed voluntarily that night, following an incident of robbery and a stabbing. The building has since been demolished and has been replaced with a waste recycling centre.

== Cultural impact and legacy ==
The club was featured in an exhibition hosted at the World Museum as part of the European Capital of Culture in July 2008 of which Liverpool was the host city.

== See also ==
- List of electronic dance music venues
- Superclub

== Sources ==
- Haslam, Dave (2015). Life After Dark: A History of British Nightclubs & Music Venues. Simon & Schuster UK. ISBN 9780857206985.
- Reynolds, Simon (2013). Generation Ecstasy: Into the World of Techno and Rave Culture. Routledge. ISBN 9781136783166.
- Reynolds, Simon (2013). Energy Flash: A Journey Through Rave Music and Dance Culture. Faber & Faber. ISBN 9780571289141.
- Webley, Elvis (2013). Hooligans, Doormen, and the Ten-Metre Walk: Ten-Metre Walk. Balboa Press. ISBN 9781452576626.
