= Methodist Central Hall, Birmingham =

Listed building in Birmingham, England

Methodist Central Hall
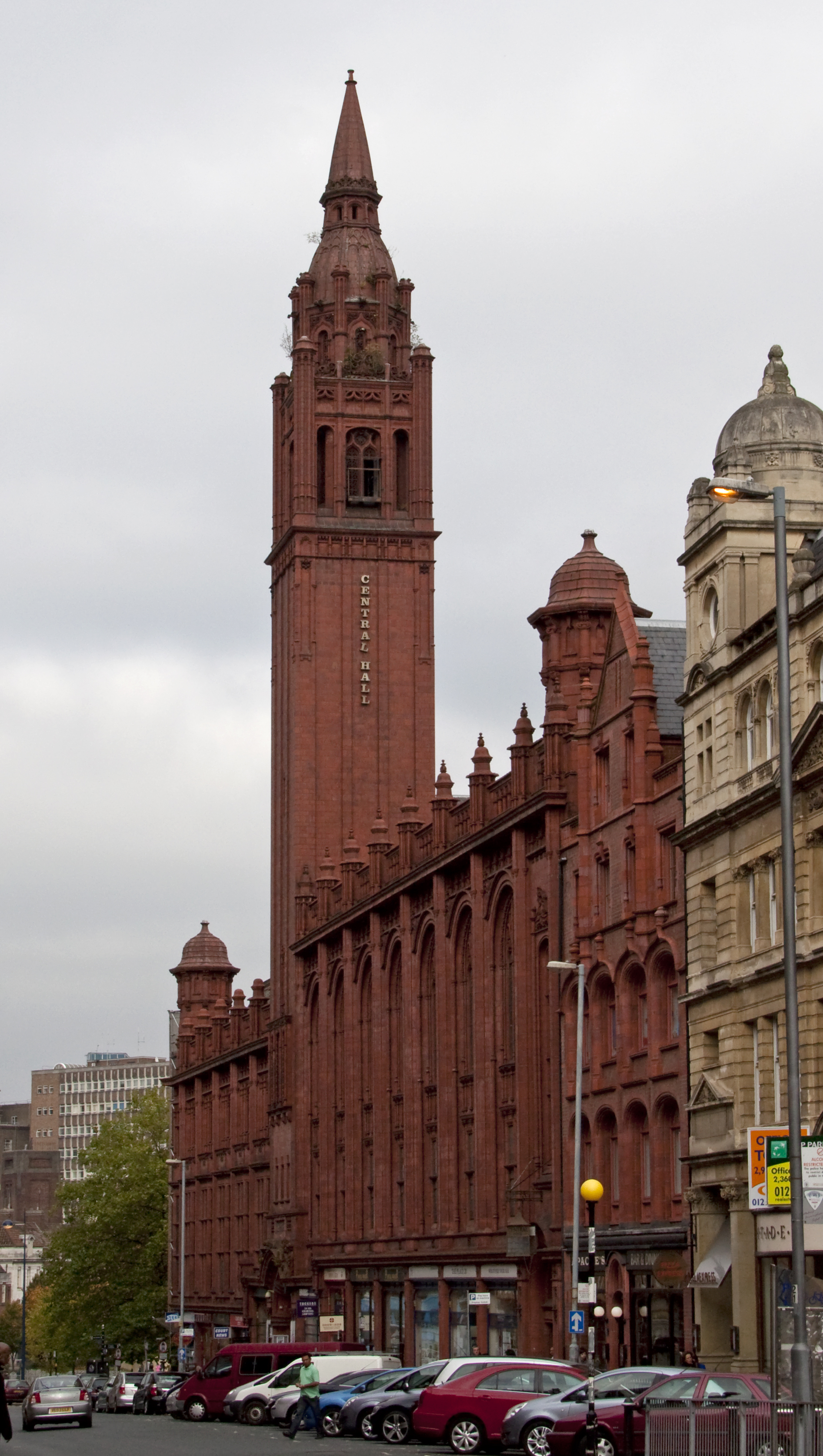
- Methodist Central Hall, Birmingham City Centre
- Interactive map of the Methodist Central Hall area

General information
- Architectural style: Gothic Revival style
- Location: 196–224 Corporation Street, Birmingham, England
- Coordinates: 52°29′01″N 1°53′33″W
- Construction started: 1903
- Completed: 1904
- Cost: £96,165

Technical details
- Floor count: 3

Design and construction
- Architects: Ewan Harper and James A. Harper

Listed Building – Grade II*
- Designated: 21 January 1970
- Reference no.: 1075607

The Methodist Central Hall, at 196–224 Corporation Street, Birmingham, England, is a three-storey red brick and terracotta Grade II* listed building with a distinctive tower at the northern end of Corporation Street.

== History ==
The building was designed by Ewan Harper and James A. Harper in the Gothic Revival style, built in red brick and terracotta and completed in 1904. The design involved an asymmetrical main frontage of 13 bays facing onto Corporation Street. It was built with a tall tower in the centre of the structure, with five bays to the left, and seven to the right, and shop fronts on the ground floor. The design complemented the Victoria Law Courts opposite, also in terracotta, and included eclectic details such as the corner turrets resembling Indian chattris. It is located within the Steelhouse Conservation Area.

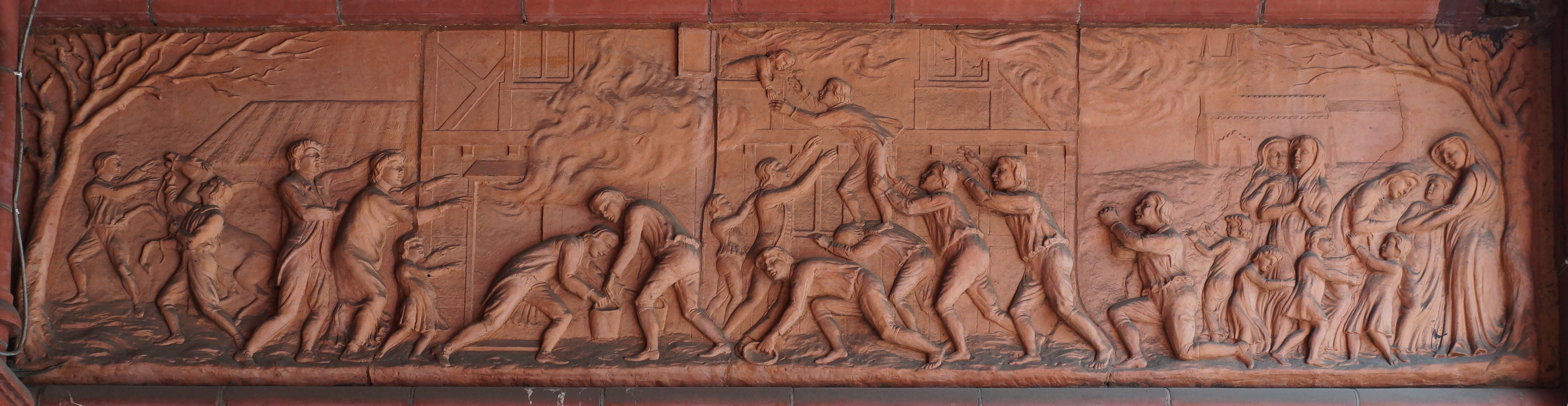
One of two Gibbs & Canning terracotta relief sculptures, Events in the Life of John Wesley, in the porch

The terracotta was manufactured by the renowned firm of Gibbs and Canning of Tamworth, which also produced decorative works for 179-203 Corporation Street and the interior of the Victoria Law Courts in Birmingham and the Natural History Museum in London. The main hall seated 2,000 and it had more than 30 other rooms, including three school halls. It cost £96,165.

In 1991, the Methodist church was converted into the Que Club, a nightclub and music venue; however, since its closure in 2002, the building fell empty and was poorly maintained. Currently it is only partially in use and its deteriorating condition has led to it being listed on Historic England's Heritage at Risk Register.

The building has been the subject of various proposals for conversion to apartments and offices. In 2018 Birmingham City Council approved plans to restore and renovate the building including a 147-bed hotel.

In July 2022, it was announced that Press Up Entertainment, would begin converting the building into a 150 bedroom hotel and event space following a grant of planning permission. The building will be renamed The Dean Hotel as part of the renovation. In May 2025, the Victorian Society included the building in its list of the 10 most endangered buildings in the country.
