= Que Club =

Music venue in Birmingham, England

Coordinates: 52.4836°N 1.8925°W

The Que Club was a music venue in Birmingham, England that was famous for hosting many well-known bands and club nights. As well as hosting famous acts, the Que Club became a centre for alternative culture, including the rave music scene.

The Que Club was located in the Grade II-listed Methodist Central Hall in Birmingham. The venue was opened in 1989 after the building was purchased by Rod Stewart's former manager Billy Gaff.

Artists performing at the venue included Altern8, Blur, David Bowie, Carl Cox, The Chemical Brothers, Daft Punk, Massive Attack, Shed Seven and Run-DMC.

During this time, the building still served as a place of worship when not in use as a venue.

The Que Club closed in 2017. A documentary film, In The Que, has been made about the club. A retrospective exhibition to celebrate the legacy of the Que Club was held at the Birmingham Museum and Art Gallery in 2022. The photographer Terence Donovan visited the Que Club in 1996, and his photographs of the rave scene there have been exhibited.
