= Marcus Garvey Centre =

Music venue in Nottingham, England

Coordinates: 52°57′11″N 1°10′35″W

The Marcus Garvey Centre is a club venue in Lenton, Nottingham, Nottinghamshire, England.

The building, also known as the Marcus Garvey Ballroom, was designed and built by Thomas Cecil Howitt in 1931 for Raleigh Bicycle Company as its main headquarters. An 'R' for Raleigh can still be seen at the apex of the stage. It is decorated with a frieze, a broad horizontal band of sculptured decoration; cherubs building bikes decorate the outside of the building. It was named the Marcus Garvey Centre after Marcus Garvey and is now an 800 capacity club venue, that has been used for offices, public events and social events for the African Caribbean community since 1981.

The Howitt building became the 400,000th Listed Building designated, at Grade II, by Historic England in August 2018
