= Godskitchen =

International superclub brand

- Genre: Dance Festival
- Website: Official website

Godskitchen is an international superclub brand which is associated with dance music and organises events, particularly in the UK and US. The company used to run a club night of the same name at their nightclub AIR, in Birmingham. Godskitchen has an in-house music label.{{ This label annually releases compilation albums, in addition to supporting new artists whom they believe bring something new to the genre.

The brand ran two outdoor events utilising the car park area adjacent to its venue AIR in Birmingham in 2010 (Godskitchen Afresco) and again in 2012 (Godskitchen SixFiveTwelve). These events had total capacities of 4000+ people and were arguably the first of their kind to take place in the city which set the precedent for similar events at other nearby venues. The 2012 event was the last time the venue was utilised before being closed and mothballed for almost a decade prior to the end of its lease with the Custard Factory.

The brand retired in 2016 with "Last Dance" events in Sydney in April, Melbourne in May, and Birmingham in June 2016, although Facebook activity had suggested an event in February 2018 in Birmingham. In 2025, Godskitchen returned to celebrate their 25-year anniversary with an event at Amnesia in Ibiza.

== Roots ==
Godskitchen's roots date back to the golden era of the UK rave scene of the early 1990s.

== First events ==
They held their first event in the UK at the Junction Nightclub in Cambridge, launching a series of sell out nights across the UK. Thereafter, Chris Griffin and Tyrone Matthews decided they would launch Godskitchen on a regular basis. In May 1996, Godskitchen began to hold weekly events in Northampton. Godskitchen sold out regularly, soon filling the 1,500 capacity Planet Nightclub in Coventry every Friday night.

== Scaling up in Milton Keynes and Birmingham ==
In 1997, Chris and Tyrone staged an event for 4,000 people at the Sanctuary Music Arena in Milton Keynes. Billed as Britain's first "stadium house music event", the party sold out in advance at a venue that fellow superclubbers Cream had failed to fill only 12 months previously.

Looking for "somewhere to call home", Godskitchen moved to the 2,000 capacity Sanctuary Nightclub (formerly the Digbeth Institute) in Digbeth, Birmingham. Godskitchen filled the Sanctuary on a regular basis. 1999 saw Godskitchen take their clubbing to the Amnesia Nightclub in Ibiza, pulling in up to 5,500 revellers on a Tuesday night. Godskitchen continued to flourish on Ibiza for another three seasons, moving to Eden in San Antonio for one summer in 2002.

Back in Birmingham, Godskitchen continued to go from strength to strength. Neil Moffitt was now on board and Godskitchen began work on a nightclub of their own, the superclub "CODE". The club opened its doors in the autumn of 2000 and, it is claimed, reached capacity and had to turn away over 20,000 people on its first night. With Friday's Godskitchen fast becoming synonymous with the trance sound, Godskitchen launched two further clubbing nights at CODE. Saturday night saw Babooshka filling the 2000 capacity venue for a second time each weekend, entertaining the masses with its glamorous style of U.S. house music and UK garage, while Sundays played host to the mixed night Polysexual, which continues to be one of the UK's most successful names in hard dance. 2003 and 2004 featured 'The Strongbow Rooms' that housed performances from the likes of Medicine 8. In June 2003, CODE was closed for a significant renovation and reopened in late September 2003 as AIR.

Expanding into the north of England, the first Godskitchen night was launched at Club Mission in Leeds on 8 February 2008, and has become a monthly occurrence at the club.

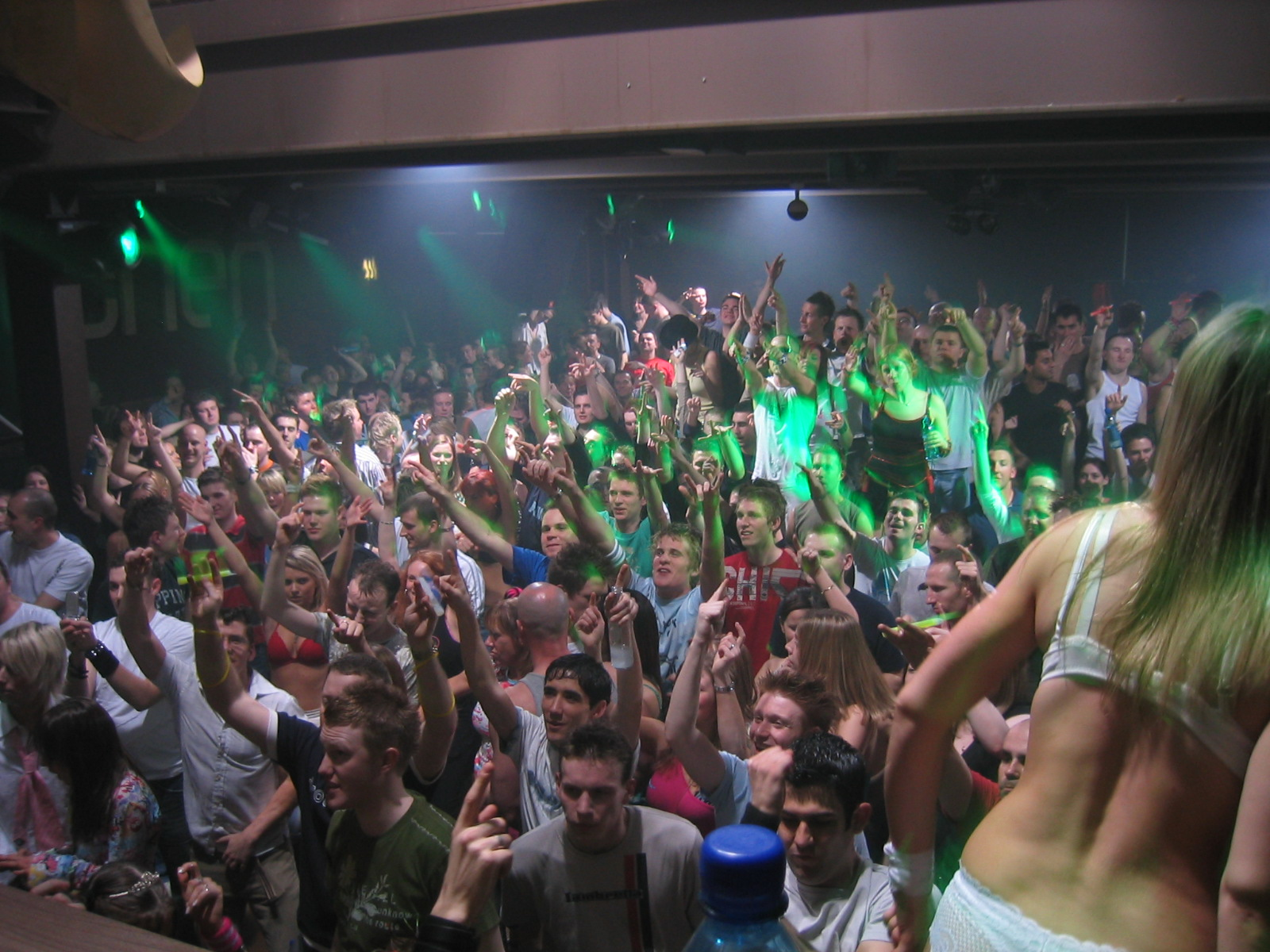
Godskitchen at AIR

== GlobalGathering ==
In the summer of 2001, Godskitchen staged their first outdoor festival, Godskitchen GlobalGathering, which saw 25,000 partygoers descend upon Long Marston Airfield on the Gloucestershire/Warwickshire border near Stratford-upon-Avon on a balmy July evening. The venue was a British summertime veteran, which had previously played host to the Phoenix Festival and the Bulldog Bash. GlobalGathering was a major success, and Godskitchen finished 2001 by returning to one of their original homes, The Sanctuary Music Arena in Milton Keynes. 2002 saw the capacity of GlobalGathering increase to 35,000 and in 2003 Godskitchen completely transformed their home venue CODE, renaming it AIR. AIR now featured three rooms. As well as staging yet another GlobalGathering, 2003 saw Godskitchen embark on an arena tour, selling out parties at the Telewest Arena in Newcastle upon Tyne and The National Exhibition Centre in Birmingham, then the UK's largest venue.

2004 saw financial controversy with the company GK entertainment—a subsidiary company of Godskitchen, and who owned the CODE venue—going into receivership subsequent to a £1 million refurbishment of the venue. Receivers were appointed and spoke to the company's current and recently departed directors Neil Moffitt, James Algate and Chris Griffin. GK entertainment was then closed down but Godskitchen and Godskitchen LTD were unaffected and continued to trade

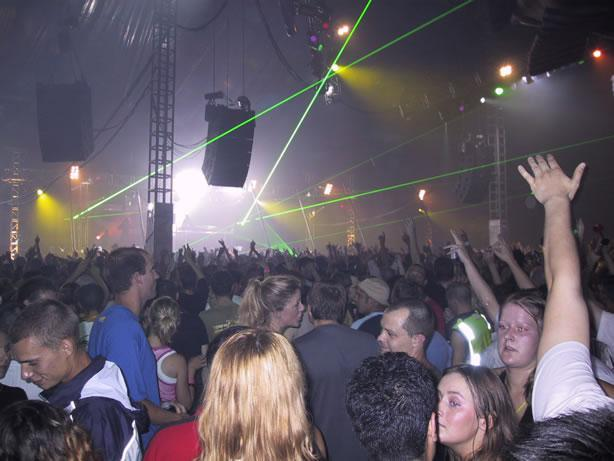
Global Gathering

== International tours ==
After another successful year and GlobalGathering in 2004, Godskitchen took the party overseas to Ireland and the US, staging events across the continent. New Year's Eve 2004/2005 saw Godskitchen hold their last Friday night in Birmingham, moving to Saturdays in 2005 in order to compete in what many had come to see as a flagging market. The final jewel in the Godskitchen crown was to take place in July 2005: GlobalGathering was expanded to cover an entire weekend (complete with camping) and the Friday night saw a fresh music policy with more emphasis placed on live acts. The capacity was again increased to 45,000 and the following day saw Godskitchen take GlobalGathering to Ireland for a 15,000-capacity event in Cork.

Global Gathering 2006 was held in the downtown area of Miami, Florida, on 18 March that year. The success of that event spawned a second US festival held on Labor Day weekend (first weekend of September in the US) at Las Vegas, Nevada.

Godskitchen events are held at Club Bonbon in Shanghai as well as in Manila, Philippines, in 2007 and 2008.

Australia held its first GlobalGathering in 2008 (a day rave for one day only) after many successful annual Godskitchen events.

In 2010, the event was held in Papaya Club on Zrce Beach in Croatia for the first time. It lasted three days, 11–13 August. Artists who performed include Axwell, Steve Angello, Sebastian Ingrosso, Gareth Emery, and Arno Cost.

== Godskitchen ==
Godskitchen Divine

Compilation album by various artists
- Released: 8 August 2000
- Genre: Electronic
- Label: Essential Recordings – 8573 83160 2

Godskitchen chronology

=== The name ===
While trying to come up with a name for their new house night, promoters Chris Griffin and Tyrone Matthews observed that the best house parties always seem to gravitate around the kitchen. They soon concluded that the very best parties would be held in God's kitchen, hence the name. This name was also used by the 1980s synthpop group Blancmange who produced a song called "God's Kitchen", although the two may not have been connected.

== See also ==
- List of electronic dance music venues
