= Victoria Law Courts =

Victoria Law Courts, Birmingham
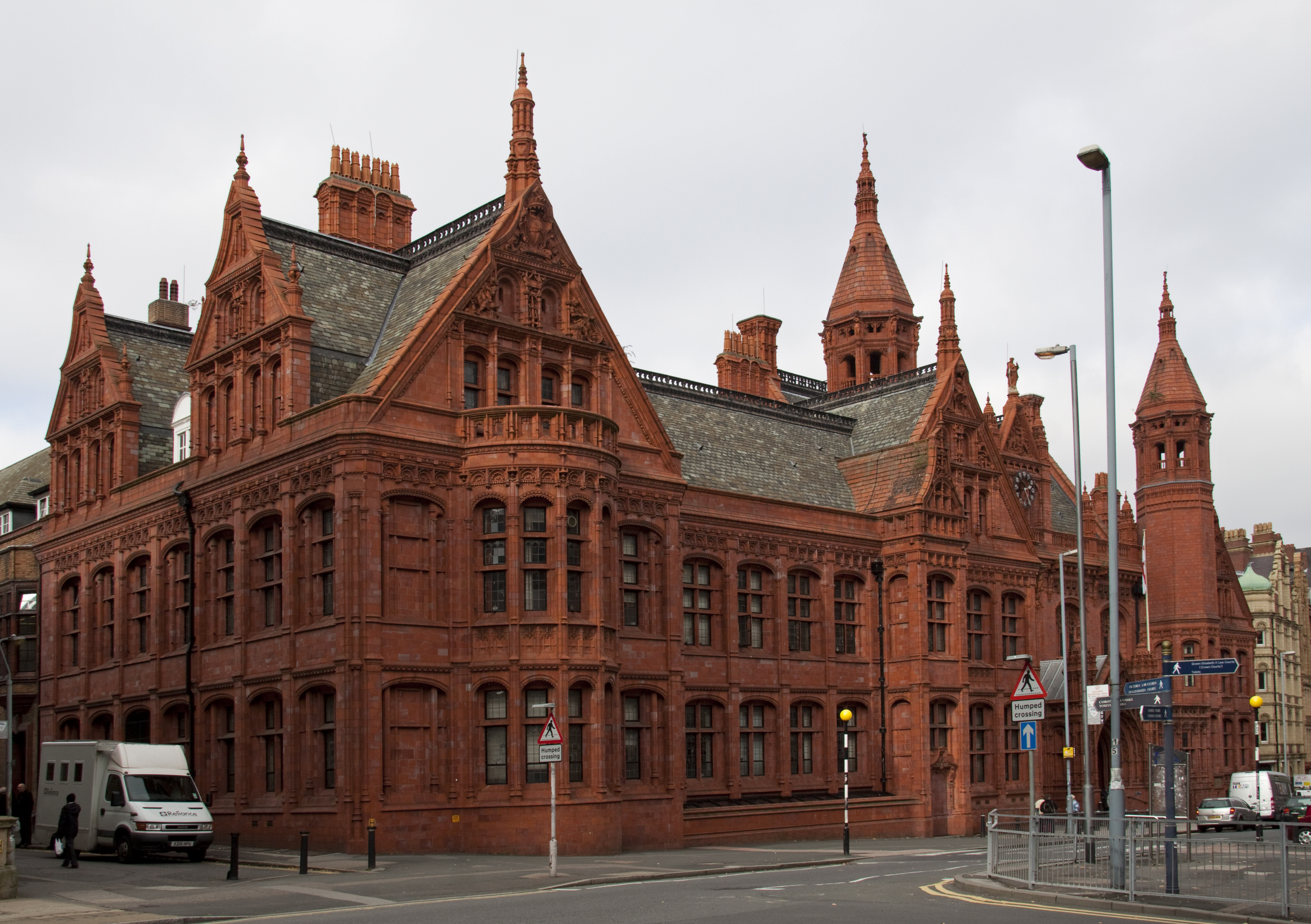
- Interactive map of the Victoria Law Courts, Birmingham area

General information
- Type: Magistrates' court
- Architectural style: Victorian
- Location: Corporation Street, Birmingham, England
- Coordinates: 52°29′0.75″N 1°53′36″W
- Construction started: 1887
- Completed: 1891, (+1894, 1914)

Design and construction
- Architects: Aston Webb & Ingress Bell
- Main contractor: John Bowen and Sons
- Awards and prizes: Grade I listed

Listed Building – Grade I
- Designated: 21 January 1970
- Reference no.: 1075605

The Victoria Law Courts is a red brick and terracotta judicial building, which accommodates Birmingham Magistrates' Court, on Corporation Street, Birmingham, England. It is a Grade I listed building.

== History ==
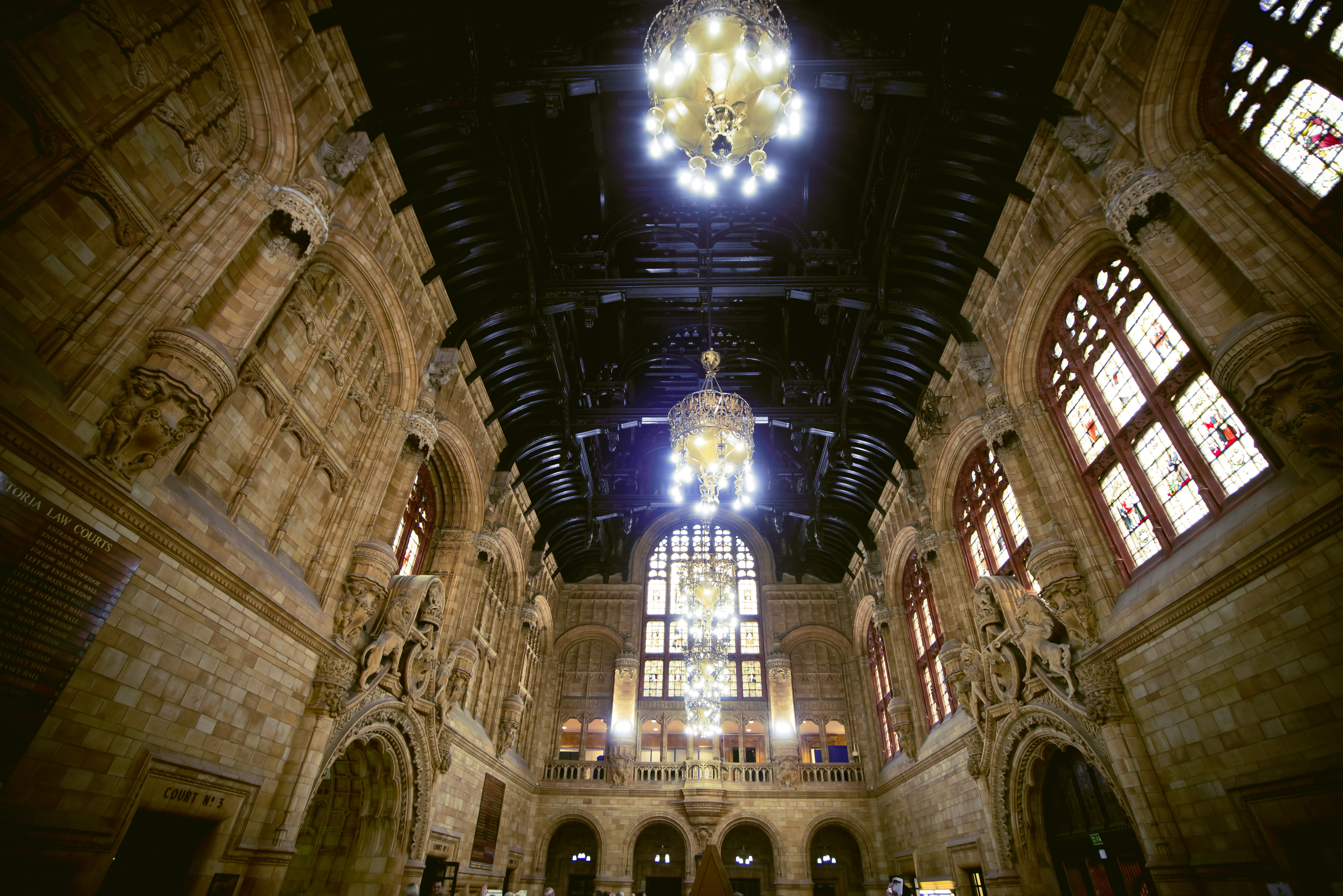
The Great Hall of Birmingham's Victoria Law Courts; serves as the main public entrance to the building

For much of the 19th century, criminal court cases were heard in the Public Office in Moor Street. However, in the early 1880s, as the number of court cases in Birmingham grew, the judicial authorities decided it was necessary to have a dedicated courthouse. The site they selected on Corporation Street had been occupied by the old Birmingham Workhouse, which had been built in 1734 and cleared away as part of a larger scheme by the mayor, Joseph Chamberlain, to demolish old slums.

The foundation stone was laid by Queen Victoria on 23 March 1887 in her Golden Jubilee year. Designed by Aston Webb & Ingress Bell of London after an open competition, assessed by architect Alfred Waterhouse, to provide the first assize courts in Birmingham, it is faced entirely in deep red terracotta from the clay of Ruabon in North Wales and covered in intricate terracotta ornamentation. The design involved an asymmetrical main frontage facing Corporation Street, with a symmetrical centre section, a long wing with two gables to the left and a single gabled bay to the right. The central section featured a large round headed main entrance with multiple hood moulds flanked by turrets and, beyond that, by octagonal towers with conical roofs. A statue of Queen Victoria by Harry Bates surmounts the main entrance. Other figures are by sculptor William Silver Frith to designs by Walter Crane.

Built by Birmingham firm John Bowen and Sons, the courts were opened by the Prince and Princess of Wales on 21 July 1891. Additions were made adding a projecting bow window on the left between 1891 and 1894 and extensions were erected along Newton Street in 1914.

The interior, including the Great Hall, is faced with sandy-yellow terracotta and intricate ornamentation. The terracotta used for the interior was produced by Gibbs and Canning of Tamworth.

Crown Court trials, i.e. criminal cases involving trial by judge and jury, moved to the Queen Elizabeth II Law Courts in Dalton Street in 1987.

A proposal was made, prior to the 2010 UK General Election, to move the magistrates' court to a new purpose-built building nearby. The project was subsequently abandoned after HM Courts Service had its budget cut and after magistrates indicated their desire to remain in the Victoria Law Courts complex.
