= Corporation Street, Birmingham =

Street in Birmingham city centre, England

Corporation Street
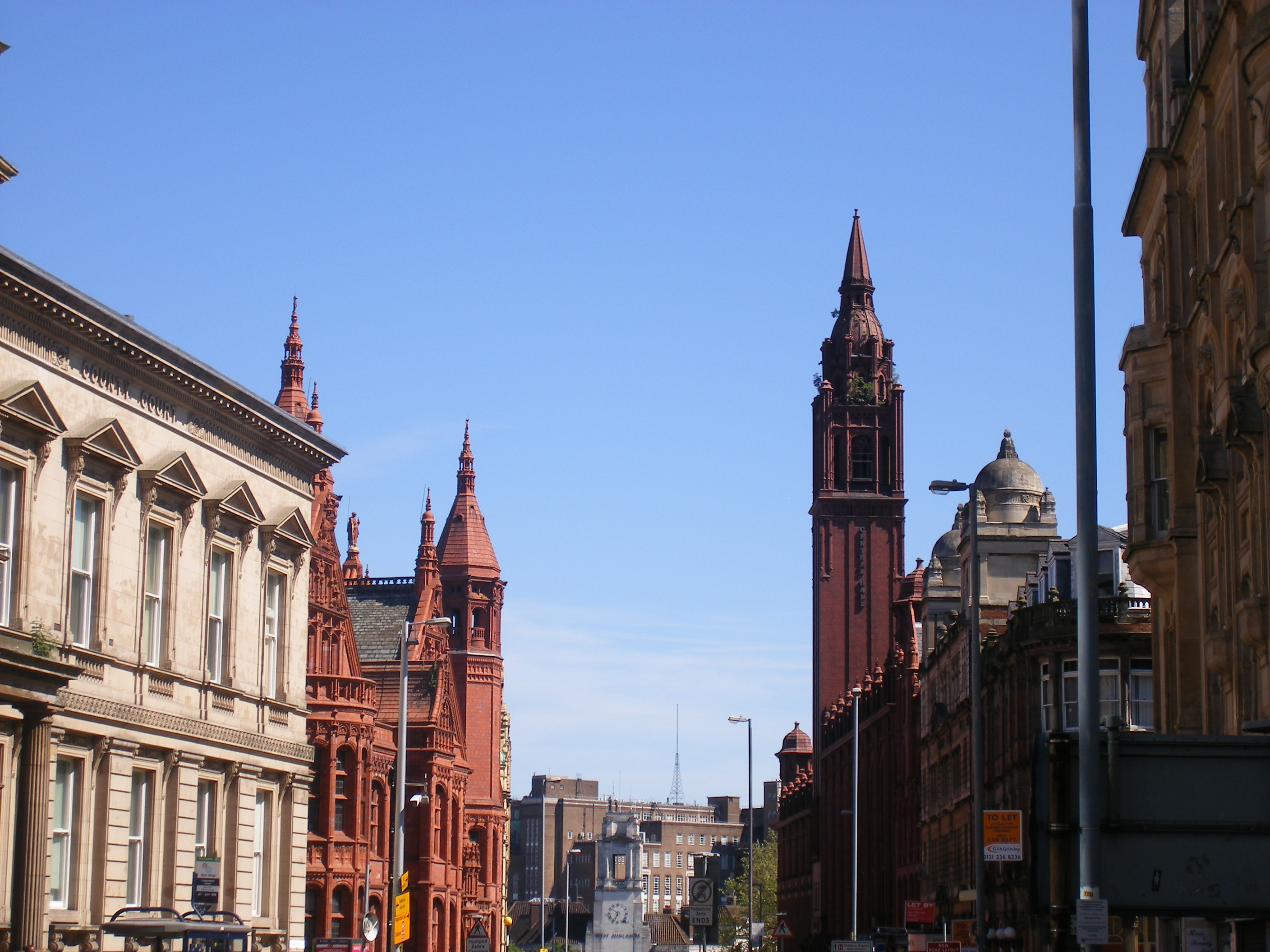
- Southward view along Corporation Street – the two terracotta buildings are Victoria Law Courts to the left and the Methodist Central Hall to the right
- Interactive map of Corporation Street
- Length: 710 m (2,330 ft)
- Location: Birmingham
- Postal code: B2 and B4
- North end: Lancaster Place; 52.484599°N 1.892504°W
- South end: Stephenson Place; 52.457567°N 1.895033°W

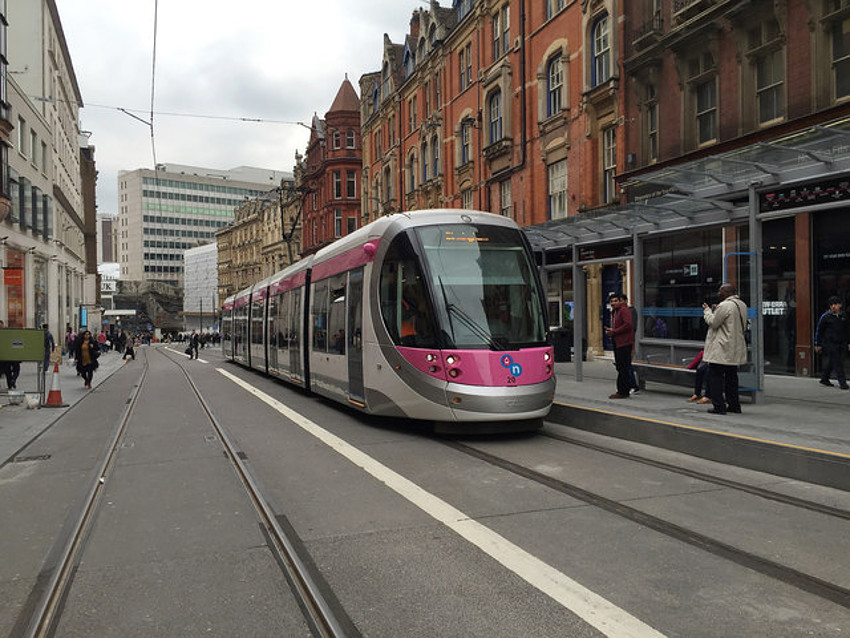
Corporation Street looking southward, including West Midlands Metro tram

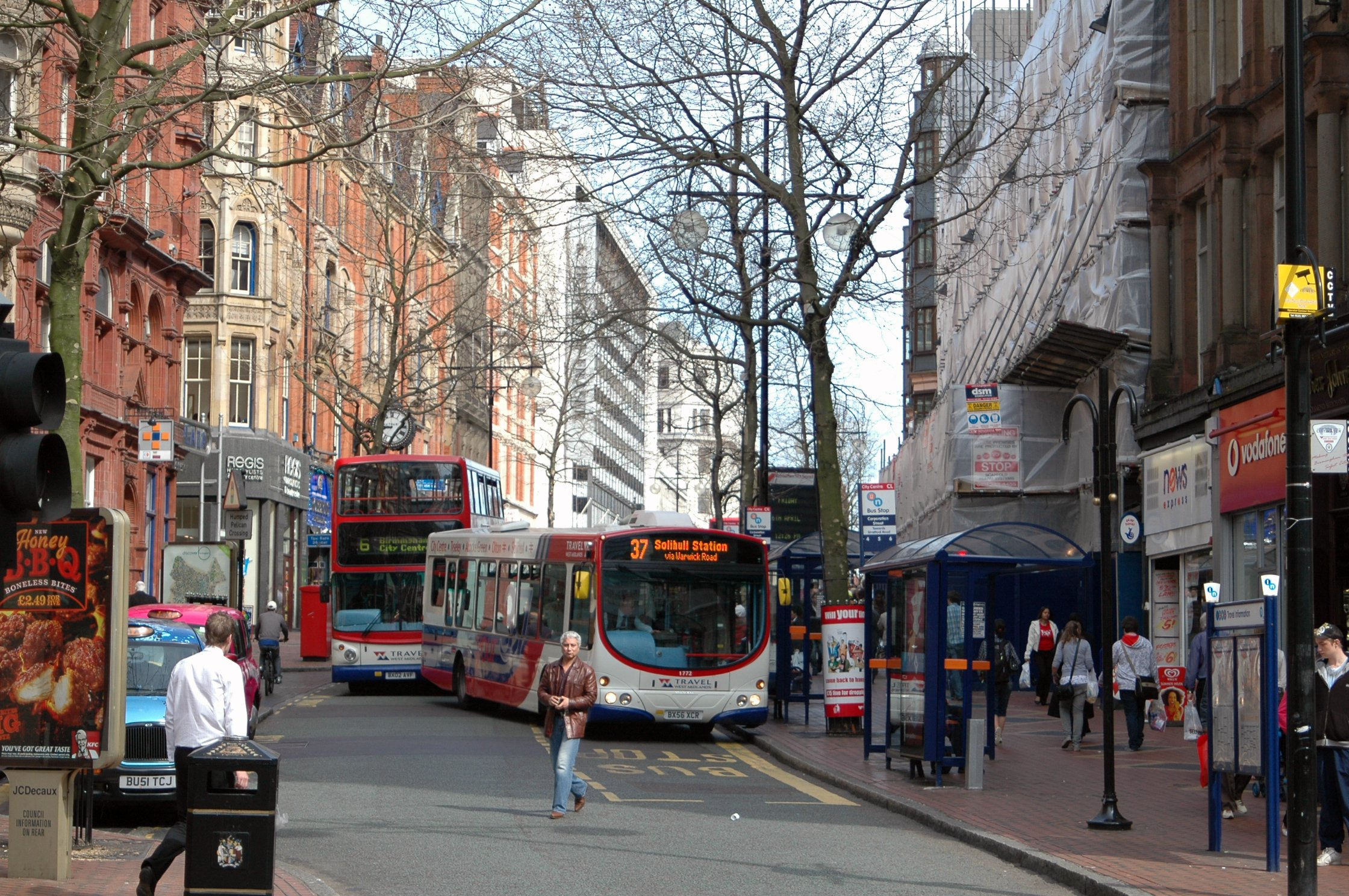
Buses stopping on Corporation Street as viewed from the junction with New Street looking northward in 2007, before Midland Metro tram extension.

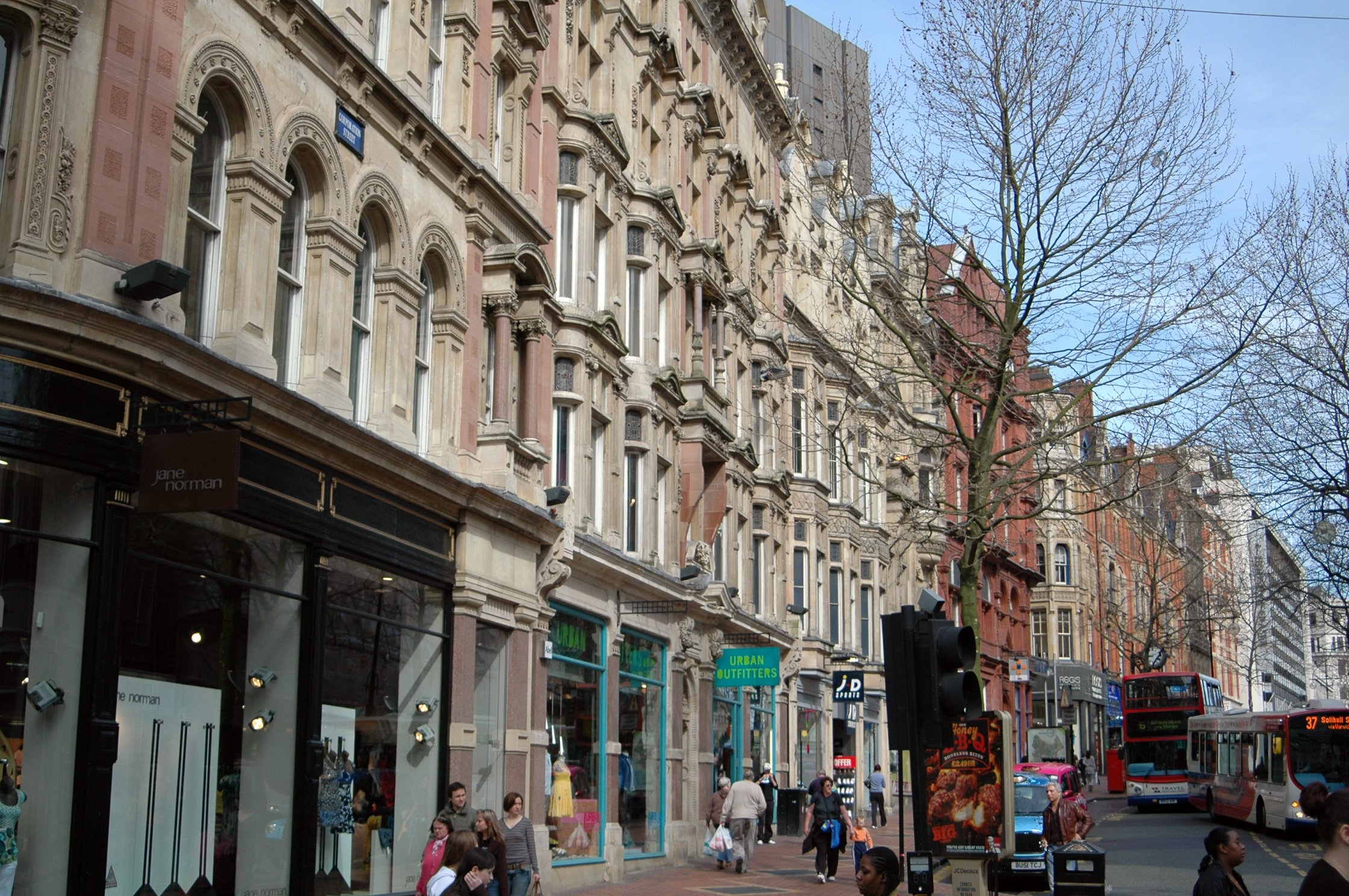
Façades of buildings fronting Corporation Street

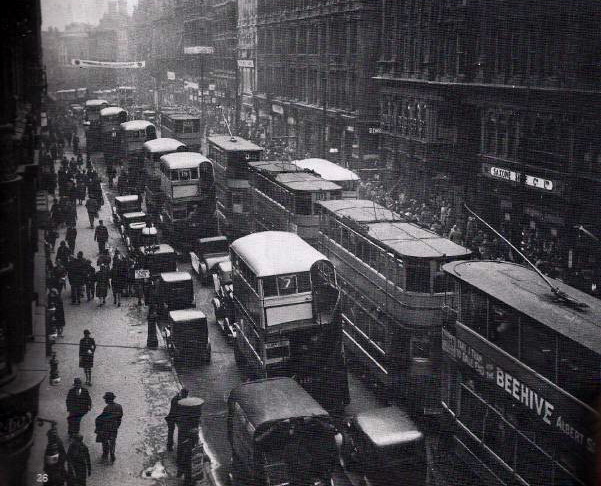
Corporation Street in 1931

Corporation Street is a main shopping street in Birmingham city centre, England. Though it has a distinct southern terminus – the junction of New Street and Stephenson Place, adjacent to the entrance of New Street station – the location of its northern terminus is debatable.

The street originally terminated at Lancaster Place – the junction of Lancaster Street, Aston Street, and Steelhouse Lane – near to the Victoria Law Courts. It was expanded beyond Lancaster Place in the early 20th century, continuing to the point where Aston Road crosses the Birmingham and Fazeley Canal at Aston Junction. The construction of the Middleway (bisecting Lancaster Place) and the incorporation of the northern stretch of the street into the A38(M) Aston Expressway resulted in a de facto terminus of the shopping street near the location of Lancaster Place.

== History ==
=== Conception ===
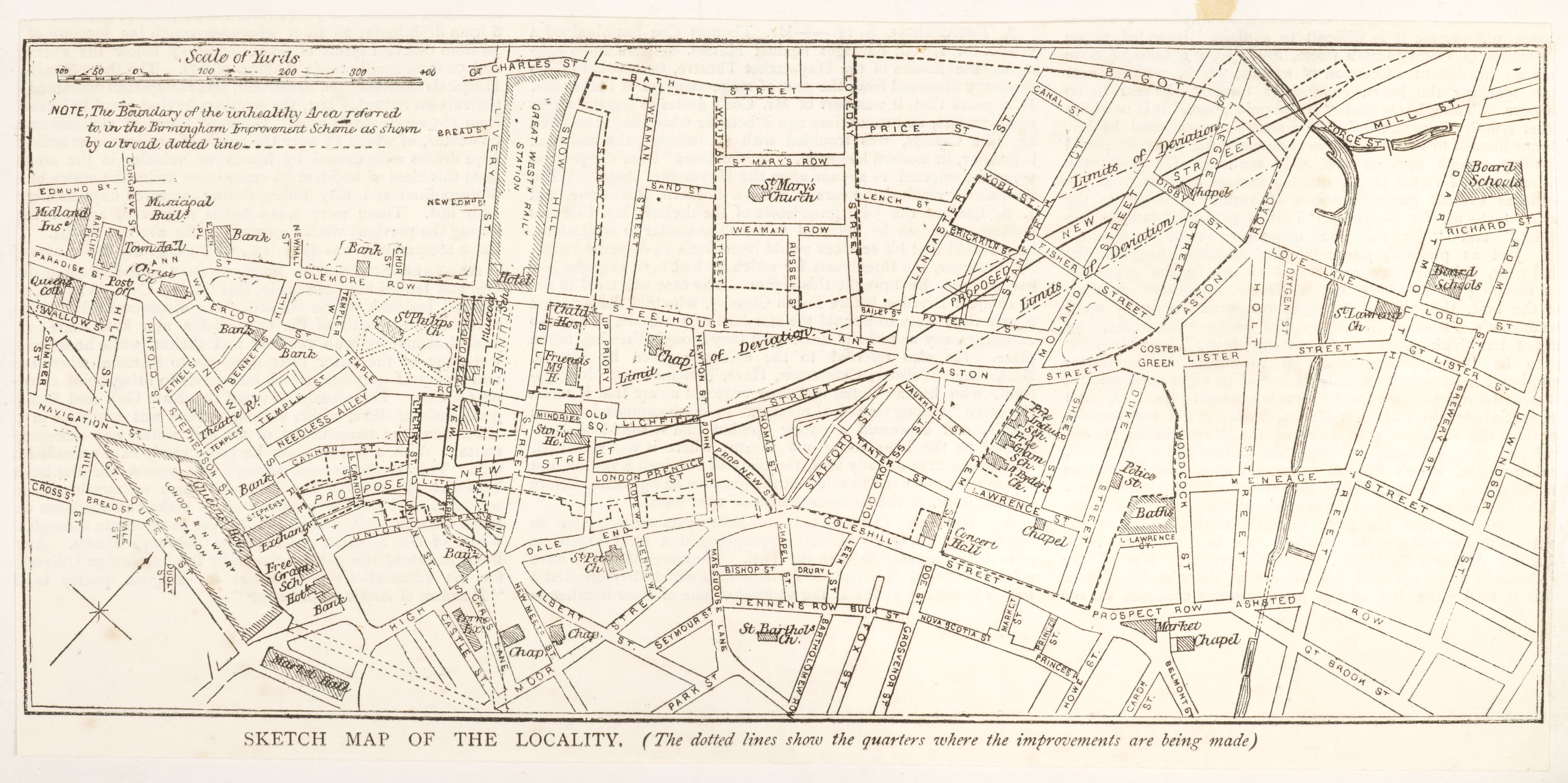
Map, circa 1876, showing the "unhealthy area" and the planned new streets

The creation of Corporation Street was enabled by the Artisans' and Labourers' Dwellings Improvement Act 1875, demolishing an "unhealthy area" of slums – the first use of the act in England. The concept of a "Parisian boulevard" was vigorously promoted by Joseph Chamberlain when he was mayor. It would have led straight to the approach of New Street station at the time (Stephenson Place). The upper part of the street incorporated Lower Litchfield Street. The street was the centrepiece of a grander scheme which also had a street cut to Colmore Row and another street to Dale End (then Martineau Street). However, the costs of such a project resulted in the abandonment of the plan for the street to Colmore Row and the street to Dale End was delayed until 1886.

=== Construction ===
Corporation Street formed part of the Great Improvement Scheme, which covered 93 acres, the Corporation buying the freehold of some 45 acres (180,000 m^{2}), at a cost of £1,310,000. Six hundred buildings were purchased and demolished for the work. The work was largely given to Martin & Chamberlain, and demolition began in August 1878, but after architect John Henry Chamberlain's death the contract for the Law Courts went to London architect Aston Webb. Sites were let to builders on a 75-year lease which expired in the 1960s, a time of much architectural destruction in Birmingham, so many buildings have been lost. The bombing during World War II also caused much destruction at the New Street railway station end of the road.

The first lease of land in January 1878 was for a women's hospital in the Priory which would later include the Grand Theatre, Cobden's Hotel and the Winter Gardens.

A fictitious address on the street, 126b Corporation Street, features in "The Adventure of the Stockbroker's Clerk", a Sherlock Holmes story written by Arthur Conan Doyle and published in 1893.

=== Conservation areas ===
The southern part of Corporation Street up to the North Western Arcade was added to the Colmore Row and Environs Conservation Area in 1985. The section of Corporation Street from Old Square to James Watt Queensway is part of the Steelhouse Conservation Area, established in 1993.

=== 21st century ===
In July 2012, the lower end of Corporation Street was pedestrianised (except for cycles and access), and buses were rerouted in preparation for the West Midlands Metro extension, which was later completed. Now the road is for trams and pedestrians only between Bull Street to the end of the road at New Street.

== Buildings ==
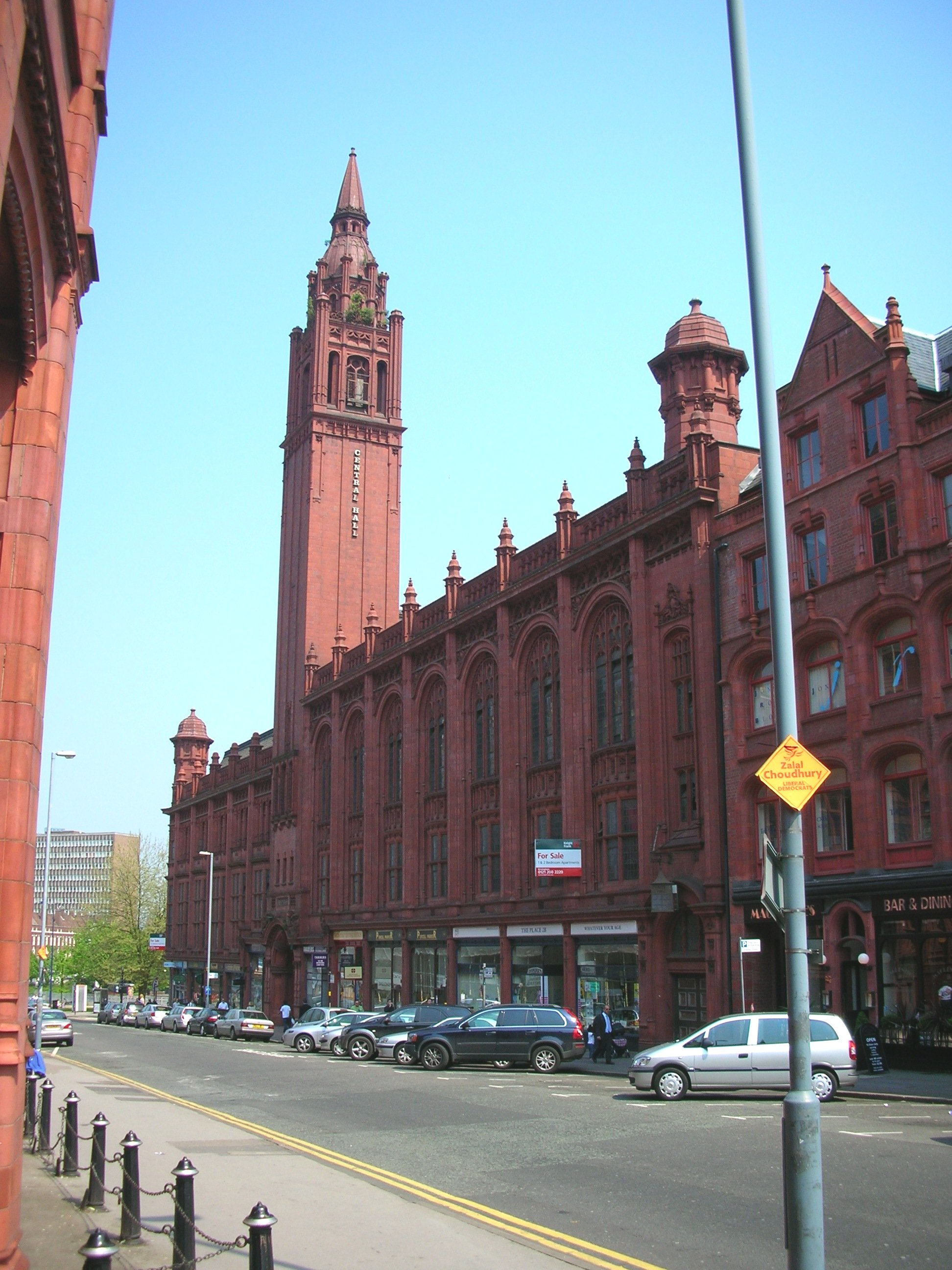
The Corporation Street elevation of Methodist Central Hall.

Corporation Street has several important Victorian listed buildings, including the red brick and terracotta Victoria Law Courts, Methodist Central Hall, and the seven buildings nearest New Street. The County Court, at the junction with Newton Street, is Grade II listed. Built in 1882 to a design by James Williamson, the building is a late example of an Italian palazzo.

The New Theatre, opened in November 1883, was located next to Old Central Hall (renamed to King's Hall) in Old Square. Both buildings witnessed numerous conversions and the New Theatre was renamed the Grand. The Grand was renamed "The Grand Casino Ballroom" before its demolition in 1960 for the construction of The Priory Queensway.

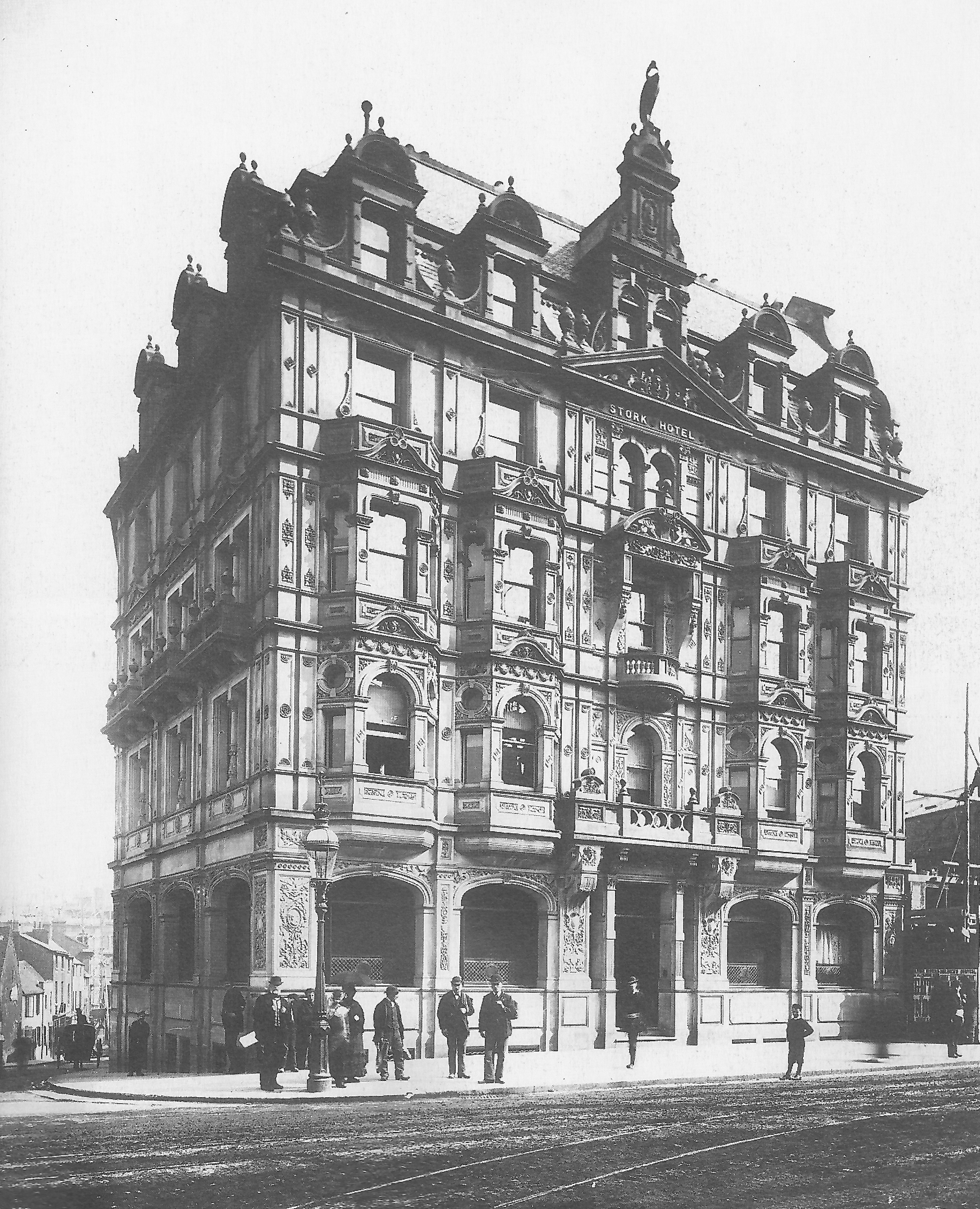
The Stork Hotel (1883–1960s)

In the northern half of Corporation Street is Old Square which features a memorial to Tony Hancock. The square, which was once a junction of the Birmingham tram network became a major road junction and today is used by a number of Birmingham bus services.

The Minories Building, formerly Lewis's Department Store, was built above a road way, which still exists, also called The Minories. The road separated the buildings with Berlin House located to the east of it and was incorporated into the Corporation Street development as it was part of the slums. The Minories is now home to numerous small shops and the ground floor fronting Corporation Street is occupied by The Square Peg, a Wetherspoons bar.

The Rackhams department store building was opened in phases between 1960 and 1966. The eight-storey façade fronting Corporation Street has 'zig-zag' windows above the ground floor.

Planned developments on Corporation Street include Martineau Galleries to replace Priory Square opposite The Minories. Priory Square is a two-storey shopping precinct of concrete Brutalist architecture. It was designed by Sir Frederick Gibberd and was opened in 1966 as Corporation Square. The Martineau Galleries scheme will see the relocation of the Oasis Market which is accessed from an entrance on the street.

Vehicular access to Corporation Street is now limited to buses and taxis; it acts as a terminus for many of the city's bus services.

C&A and Beatties former store in Birmingham, is now a shopping centre with three stores; New Look and Mothercare. The former department store site has undergone a £5 million facelift. The Beatties store opened in Birmingham in 2001 but never managed to make a profit so closed down in 2006.

== Sources ==
- A History of Birmingham, Chris Upton, 1997, ISBN 0-85033-870-0
- Pevsner Architectural Guides - Birmingham, Andy Foster, 2005, ISBN 0-300-10731-5
- Birmingham (City Building Series), Douglas Hickman, 1970, Studio Vista Limited
- A Guide to the Buildings of Birmingham, Peter Leather, ISBN 0-7524-2475-0
- The Victorian Society Birmingham Group - Three Trails, Trail 3, (Retail, Legal and Hospital Section)
