= Zuckerberg (disambiguation) =

Mark Zuckerberg (born 1984) is a co-founder of Facebook and Meta.

Zuckerberg may also refer to:

- Zuckerberg (surname)
- Mark S. Zuckerberg, an American lawyer
- Chan Zuckerberg Initiative (or Zuckerberg Initiative) ie. Zuckerberg Foundation
- Zuckerberg San Francisco General Hospital and Trauma Center (Zuckerberg Hospital), San Francisco, California, USA
- Zuckerberg Institute for Water Research (Zuckerberg Institute), Israel
- Zuckerberg Island, an island in British Columbia, Canada

== See also ==
- Zucker (disambiguation)
- Zuck (disambiguation)
- Berg (disambiguation)
