= Zuker =

Zuker is a German surname and Jewish surname. Along with Zucker, Zukerman, and Zuckerman, it derives from a descriptor of someone who dealt in sugar, or from a nickname given to someone with a fondness for sugar or who was thought to be a thief. Notable people with the surname include:

- Charles Zuker, American biologist
- Danny Zuker (born c. 1964), American writer and producer

== See also ==
- Zucker (disambiguation)
- Anthony E. Zuiker (born 1968), American television writer, television producer, and author
