= Blane De St. Croix =

American artist (born 1954)

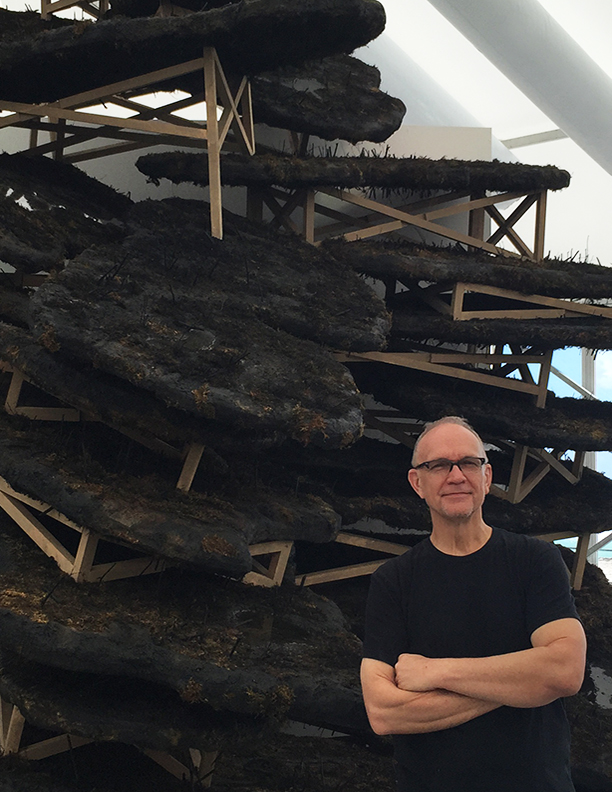
- Born: 1954 (age 71–72); Boston, Massachusetts, U.S.
- Education: Massachusetts College of Art (BFA), Cranbrook Academy of Art (MFA)
- Known for: Contemporary Sculpture, Monumental Installation, Land Art, Geopolitical Art, Environmental Art
- Awards: Guggenheim Fellowship, Smithsonian Artist Research Award, Lee Krasner Lifetime Achievement Award, Joan Mitchell Foundation Grant
- Website: https://blanedestcroix.com

Blane De St. Croix (born 1954 in Boston, Massachusetts) is an American artist best known for his monumental landscape sculptures and installations. His sculptures "focus on the various tensions underlying disjunctive communication", according to Sculpture Magazine. His awards include the Pollock-Krasner Foundation’s Lee Krasner Award, in recognition of a lifetime of artistic achievement.

== Life and career ==
De St. Croix earned a BFA in sculpture from the Massachusetts College of Art, Boston, MA and an MFA in sculpture from Cranbrook Academy of Art, Bloomfield Hills, MI.

De St. Croix has been exhibited both nationally and internationally in solo and group shows at venues including: Fredericks & Freiser, New York, NY; Sculpture Center, Long Island City, NY; Massachusetts Museum of Contemporary Art, North Adams, MA; The Johnson Museum, Cornell University, Ithaca, NY; Bass Museum of Art, Miami, FL; The Asia Society, Houston, TX; Värmlands Museum, Karlstad, Sweden; The Contemporary Art Center, New Orleans, LA. Additionally, his work is included in both institutional and private collections in the United States and abroad. His residencies include multiple MacDowell Colony Fellowships, Peterborough, NH; a Yaddo Artist Residency, Saratoga Springs, NY; a Joan Mitchell Center Residency, New Orleans, LA; The Sharpe-Walentas Studio Award Space Program, Brooklyn, NY; and Bemis Center for Contemporary Arts, Omaha, NE.

His work has been written about in publications including New York Magazine, The New York Times, Art in America, Sculpture Magazine, Artnet, The Wall Street Journal, The Boston Globe, The Chicago Tribune, Bloomberg, Art Daily, ABC News, New Art Examiner, and The Miami Herald. His work is represented by Fredericks & Freiser, New York, NY.

== Artistic themes ==
De St. Croix's sculpture investigates the human relationship to the contemporary landscape and the ecological and geopolitical conflicts embedded in that relationship. His practice is founded on extensive field research and incorporates discourses on art, cultural geography, ecology and the repurposing of the landscape genre, traditionally associated with painting, into sculptural statements. His landscape sculptures have been described by Sculpture Magazine as focusing "on the various tensions underlying disjunctive communication".

== Selected works and projects ==
=== Early works ===
Early in his career De St. Croix was interested in ecology, nature, landscape and perception. In works like Excavation (1994) and Bed of Wicker, Bed of Straw, Bed of Clay (1995) De St. Croix brought outdoor environments indoors, and initiated his work with sculptural landscape. De St. Croix began to sculpt in miniature after being employed to build scale model theater sets, which brought him to experiment with scale in his own work.

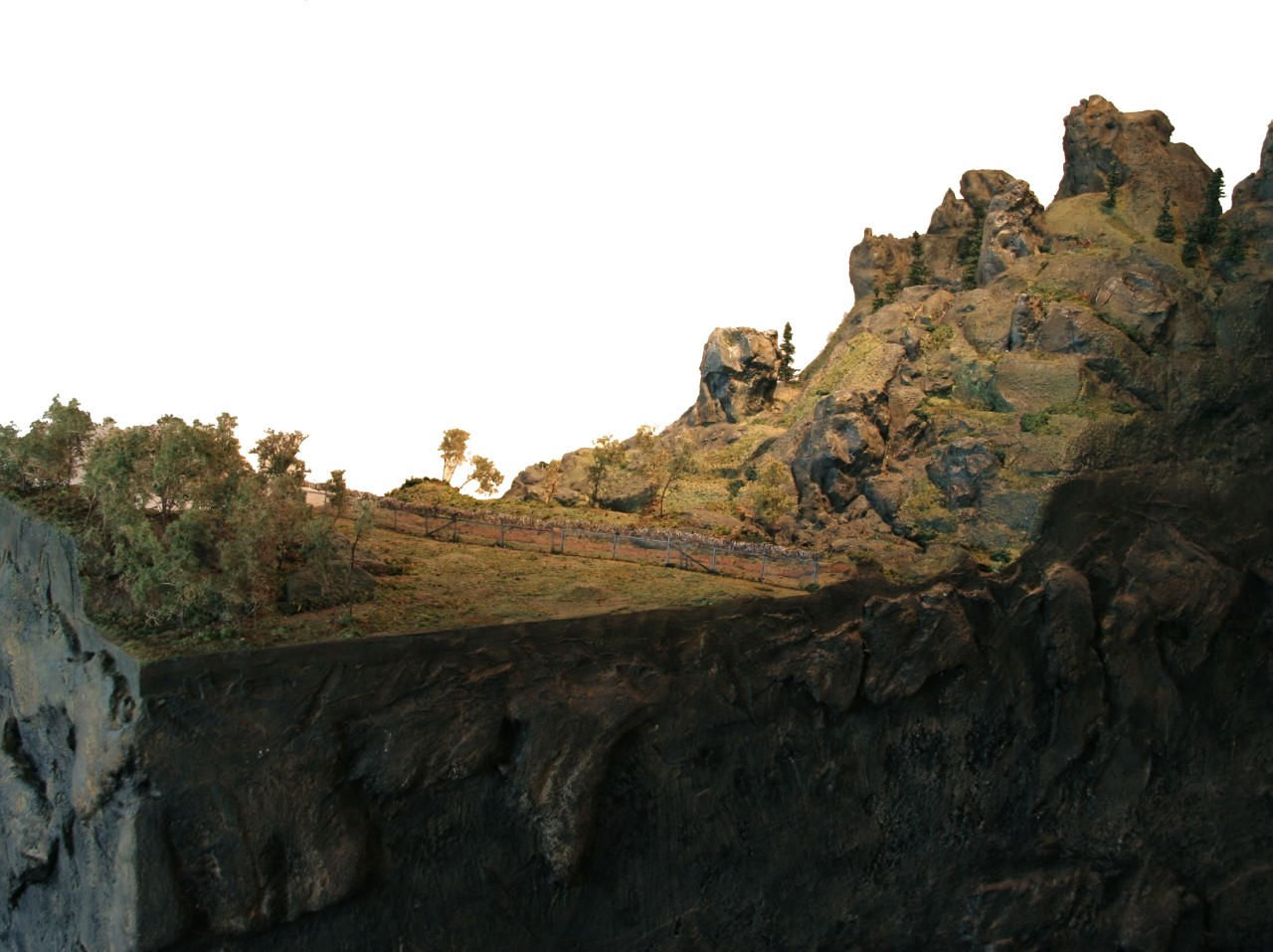
Landscape Section: Border: North/South Korea (2008)

=== Landscape Section: Border: North/South Korea (2008) ===
De St. Croix's depopulated small-scale model of the topography and fence-architecture of the demilitarized zone between North and South Korea observes the success of the structure and barrier while reflecting on the constructed and artificial nature of borders.

=== Mountain Strip (2009) ===
Rooted in research done in West Virginia where he met the anti-mining environmental activist Larry Gibson, the monumental sculptural installation Mountain Strip, over forty feet long and twenty-two feet high, reconstructed topography of a section of the strip-mined Kayford Mountain Ridge top in West Virginia.

=== Broken Landscape II (2010) ===
De St. Croix's 80 ft long sculpture Broken Landscape II depicts a section of the U.S.-Mexico border in Eagle Pass, Texas. The art critic Jerry Saltz wrote that "Lovingly detailed with hills, rocks, trees, and (of course) fencing, it expresses the desolation, desperation, and absurdity of trying to wall off one country from another. It makes both the sculpture and the policy debates seem that much more diabolical and impossible."

=== Mountain Views (2011) ===
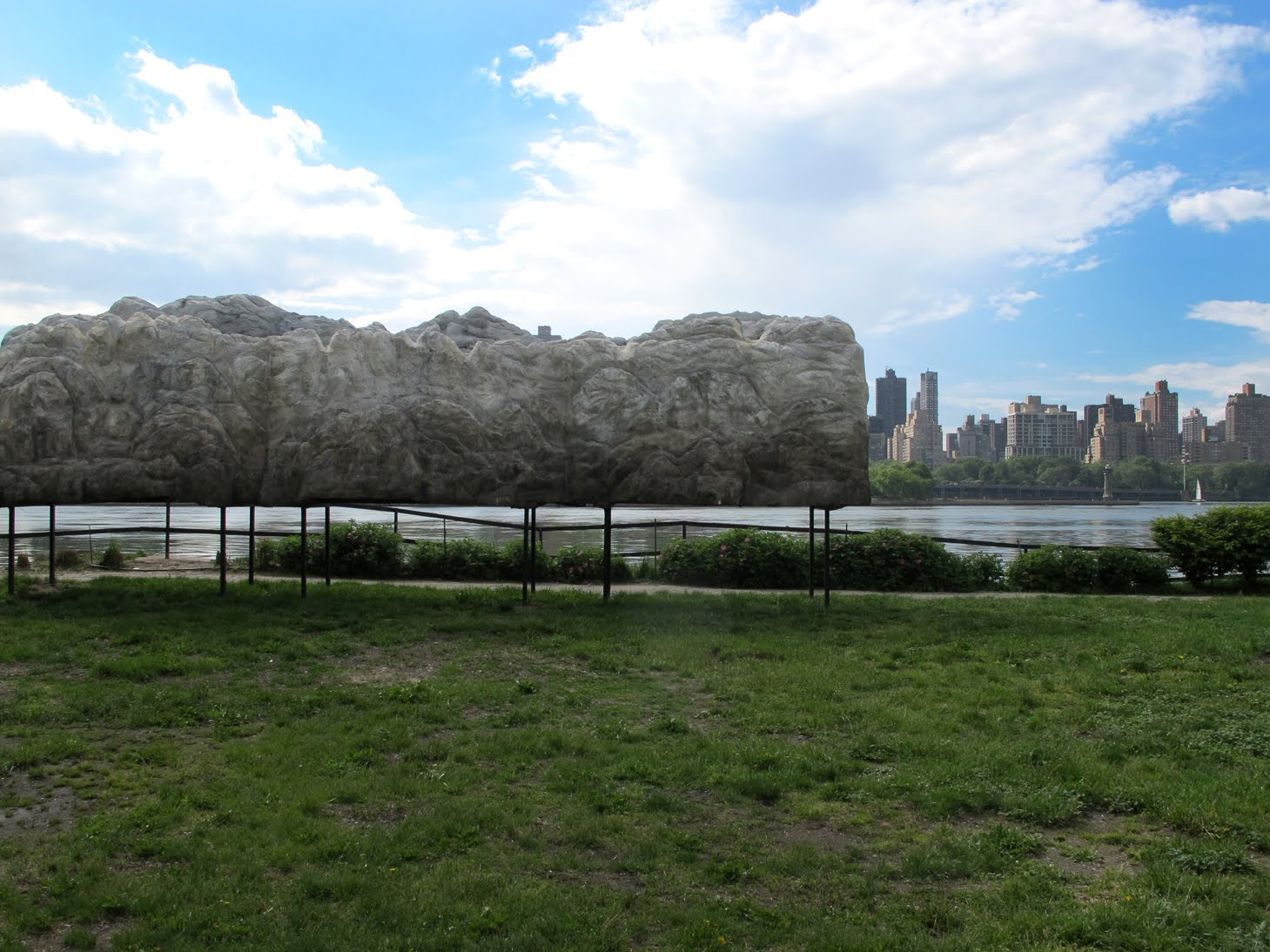
Mountain Views (2011)

Mountain Views is a monumental landscape sculpture depicting an extinct mountain range that was installed in New York City's Socrates Sculpture Park. Installed in 2011, the sculpture obstructed the New York City skyline, with the mountains acting as memorials to their own destruction caused by mountain top removal coal mining, and gesturing to a major source of energy for the city.

=== Nomadic Landscape (2012) ===
The sculpture Nomadic Landscape depicts the Mongolian Gobi Desert and was created in situ in 2012. The sculpture uses its shipping crate as a sculptural pedestal and natural materials collected from the Gobi desert.

=== Floating Fire (2014) ===
The suspended sculpture Floating Fire depicts fragmented scenes of the Florida Everglades reserve in the aftermath of encroachment and forest fires. The art historian Tami Katz-Freiman said of the sculpture that "The fragment of earth that appears in this work contains the scorched remains of plants and a pond of water. These natural vestiges seem to have been uprooted from the Sawgrass Plains in the aftermath of an ecological disaster, in order to be preserved in the museum as the last remains of a vanished world."

=== Pyramiden/Permafrost (2014) ===
The sculpture Pyramiden / Permafrost was created after a research trip to the Svalbard Archipelago and takes its name from the abandoned soviet settlement of Pyramiden, a utopian arctic coal mining community founded in 1927 and abandoned in 1998. The sculpture depicts the iconic, eponymous mountain peak overlooking the town. One side of the sculpture is a pristine representation of the snow-covered peak, the other side exposes a cross section of the mountain's dark interior and the deep permafrost of the arctic landscape, recalling a dystopian underside of the failed community and ideology.

=== Dead Ice (2014) ===
The sculpture Dead Ice was created after De St. Croix’ research trip to the Svalbard Archipelago in the Arctic Circle in 2013. The monumental sculpture features two distinct sides that divide the space in two, one human and one natural, with the sculpture itself also acting as a border between the two created spaces. On one side is depicted dead-ice, or a glacier that has ceased to move and begins melting when no longer sustained by its climate; on the other side is depicted the remnants of past arctic discovery.

=== Moving Landscape II (2020) ===
Moving Landscape II is part of the Gem State exhibition at the Sun Valley Museum of Art where De St. Croix participated in a residency in the fall of 2019. Inspired by the diversity of geological formations he encountered and the history of Sun Valley as a Union Pacific destination, De St. Croix has created an installation for the exhibition—a model Union Pacific train pulling cars that carry small sculptural models of the sites that De St. Croix visited during the residency.

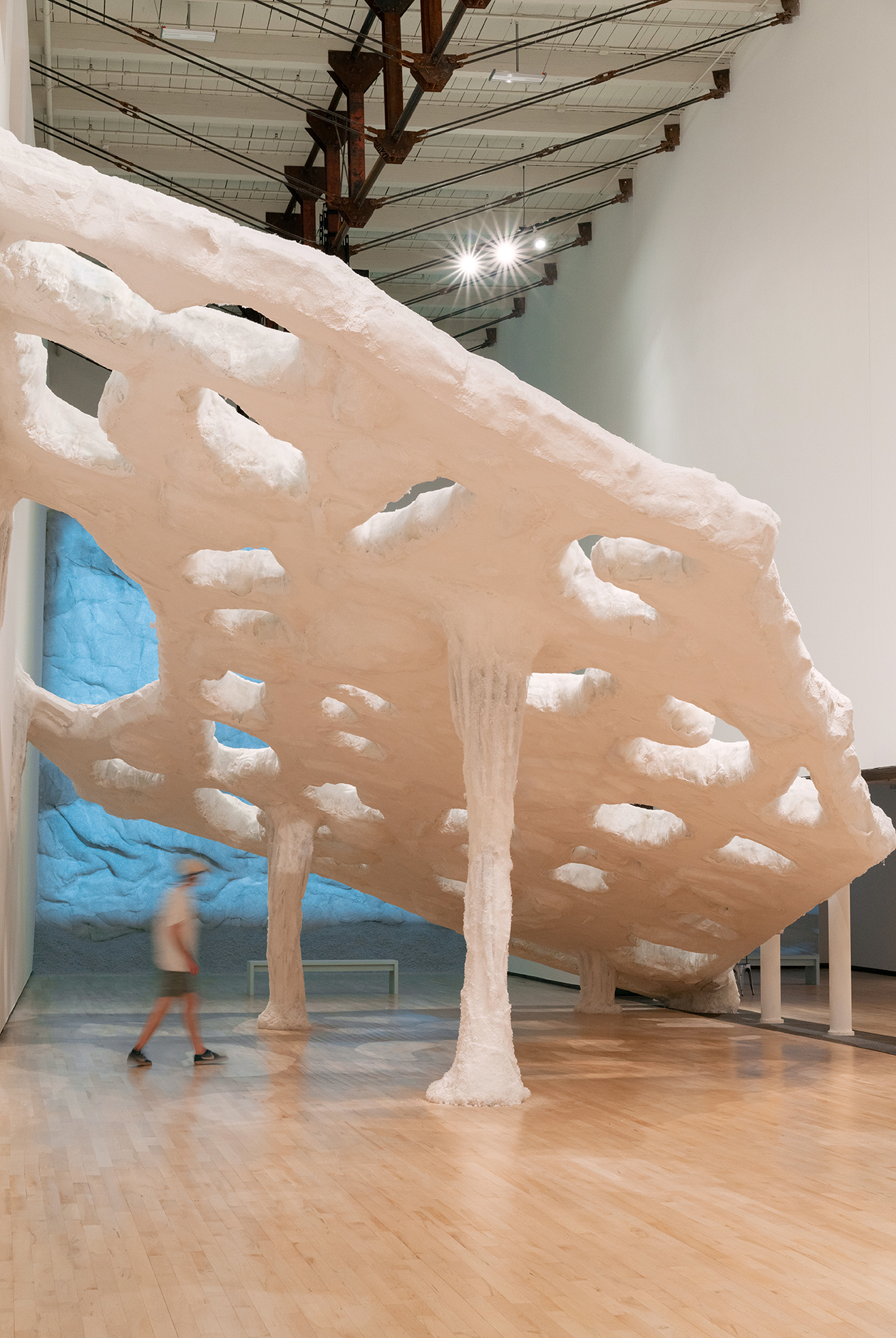
Hollow Ground (2020)

=== Hollow Ground (2020) ===
In 2019, De St. Croix visited Utqiagvik, Alaska, to observe the dissolving permafrost as a result of climate change. Using techniques including model-making, theater, and special effects, De St. Croix combines recycled styrofoam with eco-resins and other earth-friendly materials to model the surface of Hollow Ground. De St. Croix uses first hand experiences of the landscape to give viewers a glimpse into the future. This sculpture was featured in Blane De St. Croix's solo exhibition at the Massachusetts Museum of Contemporary Art, 2020 - 2021.

=== Alchemist Triptych (2020) ===
Alchemist Triptych is a sculpture that represents mineral mines extracted from the earth in hanging and tapered concentric rings. Each mineral mine has a corresponding hole in the floor which depicts the healing ground in the face of extraction. This sculpture was featured in Blane De St. Croix's solo exhibition at the Massachusetts Museum of Contemporary Art, 2020 - 2021.

=== Over Ice (2020) ===
Over Ice is a cast paper relief sculpture made from handmade paper which is based on sight photography from Svalbard depicting an aerial survey of the landscape below. The cast paper was made in collaboration with the Dieu Donné paper studio in Brooklyn, New York, a non-profit cultural institution which collaborates in the creation of contemporary art using the process of hand papermaking. This relief sculpture was featured in Blane De St. Croix's solo exhibition at the Massachusetts Museum of Contemporary Art, 2020 - 2021.

=== How to Move a Landscape (2020) ===
The film How to Move a Landscape is a collaboration between Tony Gerber and Blane De St. Croix which follows De St. Croix's trip to Utqiagvik, Alaska in 2019. The documentary style film is about the De St. Croix's artistic process and work. Preliminary footage from the film was featured in Blane De St. Croix's solo exhibition at the Massachusetts Museum of Contemporary Art, 2020 - 2021.

== Awards and recognition ==
De St. Croix has been awarded numerous awards and fellowships including the Joan Mitchell Foundation Grant for Painters and Sculptors in 2009, a Guggenheim Fellowship in 2010, a Massachusetts College of Art and Design Alumni Award for Outstanding Creative Accomplishment in 2011, a NYSCA/NYFA Artist Fellowship in the category of Architecture/Environmental Structures/Design in 2019; The Smithsonian Institution Artist Research Fellowship in 2015, The Brian Wall Award for Sculptors in 2020, and the Pollock-Krasner Foundation’s Lee Krasner Award, in recognition of a lifetime of artistic achievement, in 2020.
