= Cukier =

Cukier is a Polish surname meaning "sugar". Notable people with the surname include:

- Aniela Cukier (1900–1944), Polish painter
- Heni Ozi Cukier (born 1977), Brazilian political scientist, professor, author, and public speaker
- Józef Cukier (1889–1960), Polish leader of the Goralenvolk during World War II
- Kenneth Cukier (born 1968), American journalist and writer
- Wolf Cukier, American high school student and NASA intern who discovered an exoplanet now known as TOI-1338 b

== See also ==
- Zucker (surname)
- Zuckermann
