= Zuckermann =

Zuckermann or Zuckerman is a Yiddish or German surname meaning "sugar man".

== Zuckermann ==
- Ariel Zuckermann (born 1973), Israeli conductor
- Benedict Zuckermann (1818–1891), German scientist
- Ghil'ad Zuckermann (born 1971), Israeli/Italian/British linguist
- Hugo Zuckermann (1881–1914), Jewish-Austrian poet
- Isidor Zuckermann (1866–1946), Austrian director of timber and wood industrial company
- Wolfgang Zuckermann (1922–2018), German/American harpsichord maker

== Zuckerman ==
- Adrian Zuckerman, British legal scholar
- Adrian Zuckerman (attorney) (born 1956), Romanian lawyer
- Allison Zuckerman (born 1990), American artist
- Andrea Zuckerman, fictional character from Beverley Hills, 90210
- Andrew Zuckerman (born 1977), American filmmaker
- Angela Zuckerman (born 1965), American speed skater
- Barry Zuckerman, American non-fiction writer
- Baruch Zuckerman (1887–1970), American-Israeli Zionistic activist, and early proponent of Yad Vashem
- Ben Zuckerman (1890–1979), American fashion designer
- Benjamin Zuckerman (born 1943), American astronomer
- Bernard Zuckerman (born 1943), American chess master
- Bob Zuckerman (born 1960), American politician
- Constantine Zuckerman (born 1957), French historian
- Cordero Zuckerman (born 1992), American drag queen
- David Zuckerman (politician) (born 1971), American politician from Vermont
- David Zuckerman (computer scientist), American computer scientist
- David Zuckerman (TV producer) (born 1962), American television producer and writer
- Diana Zuckerman (born 1950), American author
- Eli Zuckerman (born 1973), Israeli sailor
- Ethan Zuckerman (born 1973), American media scholar, blogger and Internet activist
- George Zuckerman (1916–1996), American screenwriter and novelist
- Gregg Zuckerman (born 1949), American mathematician, Zuckerman functors
- Gregory Zuckerman (born 1966), American journalist
- Harriet Zuckerman (born 1937), American sociologist
- Heidi Zuckerman (born 1967/68), American museum curator
- Homer Zuckerman, owner of Wilbur the pig in Charlotte's Web
- Jeffrey Zuckerman (born 1987), Franco-American translator
- Jeremy Zuckerman (born 1975), American composer
- Joseph D. Zuckerman, American researcher
- Josh Zuckerman (born 1985), American actor
- Kathy Kohner-Zuckerman (born 1941), American surfer
- Laurel Zuckerman (born 1960), American author
- Lilla Zuckerman (born 1974), American television writer
- Lillian Zuckerman (1916–2004), American actress
- Marvin Zuckerman (1928–2018), American psychologist and researcher
- Miron Zuckerman (born 1945), American psychologist
- Molly Zuckerman-Hartung (born 1975), American painter
- Mortimer Zuckerman (born 1937), Canadian-American publisher, magazine editor, and real estate billionaire
- Nathan Zuckerman, a character from Philip Roth's Zuckerman Bound series
- Nora Zuckerman, American television screenwriter
- Peter Zuckerman (born 1979), American journalist
- Phil Zuckerman (born 1969), American author
- Roni Zuckerman (born 1981), Israeli aircraft pilot
- Shmuel Zuckerman (1856–1929), Polish-born printer
- Solly Zuckerman (1904–1993), British civil servant, zoologist, and scientific advisor
- Steve Zuckerman (born 1947), American television director
- Yehoshua Zuckerman (1938–2021), Israeli rabbi
- Yitzhak Zuckerman (1915–1981), Jewish resistance fighter in Nazi-occupied Poland

== Czuckermann ==
- Lydia Hatuel-Czuckermann (born 1963), Israeli foil fencer

== See also ==
- Cukierman
- Zucker (disambiguation)
- Zuckerberg (surname)
- Zukerman
