= Zuckerberg (surname) =

Zuckerberg is a Jewish surname of German and Yiddish origin meaning "sugar mountain". People with the surname include:

- Debbie Rosenberg (born Debbie Zuckerberg, 1969), American bridge player
- Donna Zuckerberg (born 1987), American writer and classical scholar
- Mark Zuckerberg (born 1984), American programmer and internet entrepreneur, founder of Facebook
- Mark S. Zuckerberg, American lawyer
- Randi Zuckerberg (born 1982), American psychologist and entrepreneur, marketing director of Facebook
- Regina Zuckerberg (1888–1964), Austrian-American Yiddish theatre actress

== See also ==
- Zuckerberg (disambiguation)
- Paul Zukerberg
- Zucker (disambiguation)
