= Creamfields BA =

Annual Argentine music festival

Creamfields Buenos Aires
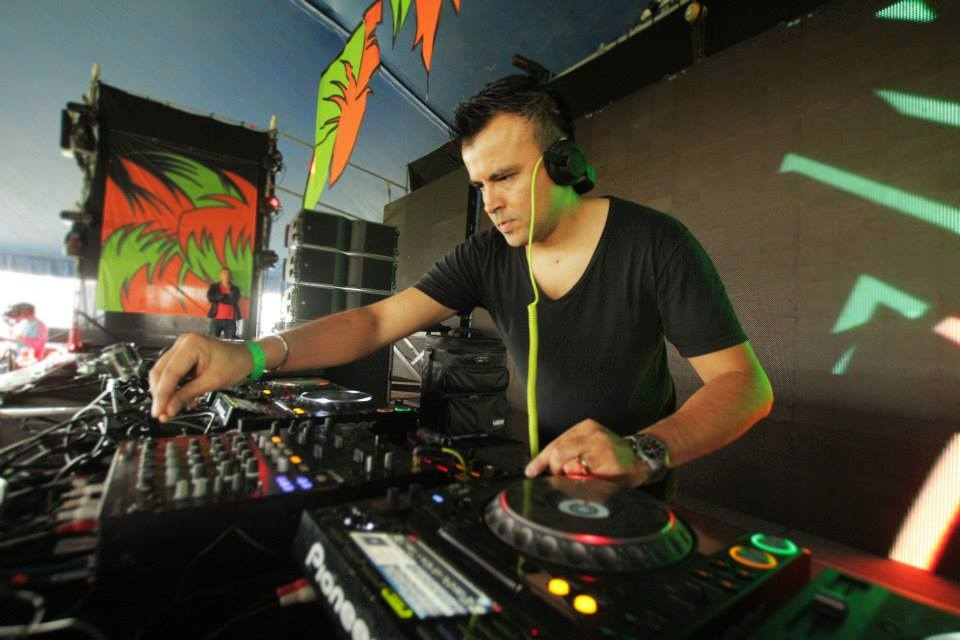
- Genre: Electronic dance music
- Locations: Buenos Aires, Argentina
- Years active: 2001–2015 / 2024–present
- Founders: Cream
- Attendance: 70,000+
- Website: http://www.creamfieldsba.com

Creamfields Buenos Aires is an annual electronic music festival hosted in Buenos Aires featuring DJs recognized in the worldwide electronic scene. It has seen more attendees compared to other Creamfields events in Latin America with almost 70,000 people attending its sixth edition.

Creamfields BA was the first Creamfields festival to be organised outside of Cream's hometown of Liverpool, but the move to Buenos Aires was seen as a risky one as it coincided with Argentina fell into the worst economic crisis in its history. Thus, it was uncertain how an event of such magnitude would be profitable in a country with severe economic problems. Creamfields Buenos Aires is organised annually by the promoter 2NET, that also hosts other several other electronic music events in Buenos Aires, Mar del Plata and Punta del Este.

== Creamfields Buenos Aires 2001 ==
18,000 people responded to the event's first invitations. Creamfields Buenos Aires was held in an estate of six hectares on the Race course of San Isidro. Paul Oakenfold, Dave Seaman, Howie B, Layo & Bushwacka!, Satoshi Tomiie, Danny Rampling, Circulation, Hernan Cattaneo and Way Out West, among other figures, arrived at Argentina to participate in the festival.

== Creamfields Buenos Aires 2002 ==
The 2002 edition of the festival choose a similar lease for the second consecutive edition of Creamfields Buenos Aires, Dock 1 of Puerto Madero. With the extension of the recreational sectors another carp with capacity for 7,000 people was added to create ample space to relax overlooking the river. 24,000 people participated during 16 hours of the music from Frankie Knuckles, Timo Maas, Satoshi Tomiie, Nick Warren, Sister Bliss (Faithless), Medicine 8, Pete Tong, Hernan Cattaneo, Babasónicos, Zuker and Romina Cohn, among others.

== Creamfields Buenos Aires 2003 ==
The 2003 festival exhausted local officials with a guest list that surpassed 35,000 people. The incorporation of an alternative sounds stage gained great acceptance in this third edition of Creamfields. Layo & Bushwacka!, Sander Kleinenberg, Danny Howells, Junkie XL (live), Hernan Cattaneo, Audio Bullys, Babasónicos, Josh Wink, Scratch Perverts, Dj Marky, Catupecu Machu 5.1, Infusion (live) were only some of the DJs that participated in 2003.

== Creamfields Buenos Aires 2004 ==
The guest list for the fourth edition of Creamfields Buenos Aires broke records at the international level – surpassing that of the original festival in Liverpool. In its fourth edition, nearly 55,000 people made it one of the largest events of the year in Argentina.

The place chosen for 2004 was an estate located in the former Sport City of La Boca, 13 hectares surrounded by woods in South Costanera. This move suggested great structural growth within the production of the festival. The festival's line-up included more than 90 local and international artists including Groove Armada, Paul Oakenfold, Deep Dish, Hernan Cattaneo, Jeff Mills, Darren Emerson, Erick Morillo, Steve Lawler, Plump DJs and Dave Angel, and many others.

== Creamfields Buenos Aires 2005 ==
Creamfields Buenos Aires 2005 broke records once again, surpassing all previous editions as well as equivalent global events.

60,000 people participated in the fifth edition of the festival and enjoyed the more than 100 DJs, producers and bands that played in 10 spaces arranged in a circular fashion in the estate located in the Ex-Ciudad deportiva La Boca.

The Prodigy, Audio Bullys, Infusion and the premises Zuker XP provided some of the highlights on the Main Stage, which was closed by Paul Oakenfold. Danny Howells, Hernán Cattáneo, 2 Many DJs, David Guetta, Luke Fair, Kevin Saunderson, James Holden, DJ Vibe and Ivan Smagghe are some of the other names that played at this edition of Creamfields Buenos Aires.

== Creamfields Buenos Aires 2006 ==
With a response that surpassed to the previous one – with more than 62,000 assistants Creamfields Buenos Aires affirmed, once again, its status as one of the most important electronic music festivals of the continent and one of the most popular in the entire world.

More than 90 DJs, producers and bands acted distributed in the nine spaces distributed in the great located circular space in the south of the city. That year, Underworld, Sasha, Erick Morillo, Tiga, Hernán Cattáneo, Sander Kleinenberg, Dave Clarke, X-Press 2, Layo & Bushwacka!, NIC Fanciulli, M.A.N.D.Y., Silicone Soul, 2020 Soundsystem, Zuker, Paul Woolford, Damian Lazarus, Force suicide on Sports Club were of the game. The incorporation of the Soup carp, proposal dedicated to more techno and minimal electronic music, with international guests Matthew Dear and Troy Pierce, had great acceptance from the public.

== Creamfields Buenos Aires 2007 ==
With the participation of more than 55,000 people, and 90 DJs, the electronic event was held at the Automobile race track in the City of Buenos Aires. With The Chemical Brothers as headliners, Carl Cox, John Digweed, Dubfire (Deep Dish), Hernán Cattaneo, LCD Soundsystem, James Zabiela, 2 Many DJs, Tiefschwarz, Craig Richards, Christian Smith, Martin Garcia, Mark Farina, Mathias Schaffhäuser, Zuker and Wally Lopez, it again confirmed its status the important Creamfields in the world, after the United Kingdom one. This had like individual, the control of the Argentine State in the matter of security, to prevent the entrance of attendees with ecstasy and other recreational drugs frequently used at dance music events.

== Creamfields Buenos Aires 2008 ==
Around 50,000 people gathered once again at the Automobile race track of the City of Buenos Aires to enjoy the sounds of near 90 DJs and producers around the world. Names like Hernan Cattaneo, Steve Lawler, Satoshi Tomiie, Booka Shade, Deadmau5, UNKLE, Gorillaz Soundsystem, David Guetta, Gui Boratto and Roger Sanchez were in the line-up, among with Erick Morillo, who closed the main stage.

== See also ==
- List of electronic music festivals
