= List of Creamfields line-ups =

Creamfields is a British Electronic dance music festival which takes place in Daresbury, Cheshire, and has operated since 1998. Below is a list of line-ups for the festival:

== 2011 ==
=== Saturday ===
North Stage	Clublife Stage	Paul Van Dyk Presents Evolution	Pryda Friends	Size Matters	Annie Mac Presents	BBC Radio 1 Xtra	Strongbow ‘The Graft & The Glory'	Mixmag Future Heroes	Jäger Rock Truck	Hed Kandi Hospitality
The Chemical Brothers (Dance Festival Exclusive); Magnetic Man; Katy B; Skrillex; Feed Me	Tiesto (UK Festival Exclusive); Calvin Harris; Diplo; Mark Knight; Hardwell	Paul Van Dyk (UK Festival Exclusive); Ferry Corsten; Eddie Halliwell; Judge Jules; John O'Callaghan; Giuseppe Ottaviani; Marcus Schössow; Gareth Wyn	Eric Prydz; Sasha; Pete Tong; James Zabiela; Joris Voorn; Sébastien Léger; Funk D'Void; Jeremy Olander	Steve Angello; Dirty South; Alex Metric; An21; Dave Spoon; Third Party; Special Guest: Benny Benassi	Annie Mac; Boys Noize; Erol Alkan; Boys Noize; Fake Blood (live); Jack Beats; The 2 Bears; Flight Facilities; Special Guest: Mark Ronson	Andy C; Caspa; Danny Byrd; Goldie; MistaJam; N-Type; DJ Fresh; Hatcha; Crissy Criss; Chimpo; Joker	Brodinski; Kissy Sell Out; Retro/Grade (live); Rory Phillips; Maxxi Soundsystem; Chad Valley (live); Louis la Roche; Mr Paul	D.O.D; Igor Project; Ricochet Musica; Nelly; Anthony Probyn; Jemmy; Ed Mackie; James Dutton	Ellesse; Mark Mac; Sam Rice; Zutekh; Rob Casson + Andy Currie	Bambina; Phil Faversham; Sam Cannon; Sarah Louise; Alan Hartley; Percussion: Steve Lewis; Saxophone: Yasmin

=== Sunday ===
North Stage	South Stage	Swedish House Mafia	Cream	Mixmag Presents Cocoon	Super You&Me	Goodgreef Xtra-Hard	Strongbow ‘The Graft & The Glory'	Residents Arena	Jäger Rock Truck	Hed Kandi Hospitality
David Guetta; Afrojack; Chris Lake; Sunnery James & Ryan Marciano; Retrograde; Alan	Armin van Buuren (UK Festival Exclusive); Example; Chicane; Kaskade	Swedish House Mafia (English Festival Exclusive); Calvin Harris; A-Trak; Max Vangeli; Norman Doray; Thomas Gold; Alesso	Above & Beyond; Gareth Emery; Markus Schulz; Hernan Cattaneo; Adam Sheridan; Rob Harnetty; Exclusive Special Guest: Paul Oakenfold	Sven Väth; Marco Carola; Josh Wink; Onur Özer; Tobi Neumann	Laidback Luke; Wolfgang Gartner; Carte Blanche featuring: DJ Mehdi & Riton; Congorock; Sandro Silva; Oliver Twizt	Showtek; Lisa Lashes; Kutski; Alex Kidd; Andy Whitby; Rob Tissera; Fausto B2B Phil York; Brian M Vs McBunn; Argy; Exclusive Live Debut: Organ Donors Live	Zinc; Jaguar Skills; Goldierocks; Dansette Junior (live); Stopmakingme; Star Slinger (live); Marc Roberts; General Jimmy	H2; Tim Owen; Adam Helliwell; Thomas Tuft; Steve Parry; Lee Rands; Anton Powers; Sean Hughes; Lee Ellis; Andy Woods; Chris MiMo	Paul Nunn & James Glover; LMP DJ's; Denny Dowd; Andy Clayton & Mark Bryan; Simon Unwin; Kev McGowan; Dash; Autophase	Andy Norman; Carl Hanaghan; Andy Daniels; Stephanie Jay; Alan Hartley; Percussion: Steve Lewis; Saxophone: Yasmin

== 2012 ==
=== Saturday ===
South Stage	North Stage	Cream in Association with MixMag	Size Matters	Pryda Friends	BBC Radio 1 Xtra	Annie Mac Presents	Fire it Up	Hed Kandi Hospitality	Nation Stage
Avicii (Dance festival exclusive); Sebastian Ingrosso (Exclusive); Alesso; Cazzette; Norman Doray; Syn Cole	David Guetta (Dance festival exclusive); Example (Dance festival exclusive); Afrojack; Nicky Romero; Nervo; Dimitri Vegas & Like Mike	Above & Beyond; Gareth Emery; Markus Schulz; Judge Jules; Mat Zo; Gareth Wyn; Ben Gold; Rob Harnetty	Steve Angello (Exclusive); Pete Tong; An21 & Max Vangeli; Third Party; Tim Mason; Qulinez; Special Guest: Benny Benassi	Eric Prydz; John Digweed; Joris Voorn; Maya Jane Coles; Scuba; Sébastien Léger; Jeremy Olander	Skrillex; Skream feat. SGT Pokes; Benga feat. Youngman; Andy C feat. MC GQ; Caspa; Flux Pavilion; Friction; MistaJam; Doctor P; Loadstar feat. MC Texas and Ikay; KOAN Sound; Rudimental	Annie Mac; Major Lazer; Erol Alkan; Crookers; Madeon; Brodinski vs Gesaffelstein; Melé; The Chemical Brothers (DJ Set)	Eddie Halliwell; Sander van Doorn; Mark Knight; Funkagenda; Michael Woods; Thomas Gold; Kryder; D.O.D	Phil Faversham; Sam Cannon; DJ Eibhlin; Sarah Louise; Steve Lewis (Percussion); Aimee Jay (Saxophone)	Jordan Suckley; Andi Durrant; Anton Powers; Dave Whelan; Ian Longo; Denny Dowd; Sean Hughes; James Dutton; Ricochet Musica

=== Sunday ===
(The festival was cancelled on Sunday due to heavy rain)

North Stage	Clublife South Stage	Cream	Super You&Me	Groove Armada Presents
Deadmau5 (Dance festival exclusive); Calvin Harris (Dance festival exclusive); Zane Lowe; Feed Me; Porter Robinson	Tiësto (exclusive); Axwell; Dirty South; Hardwell; Tommy Trash	Paul Van Dyk; Ferry Corsten; John O'Callaghan; Simon Patterson; Ørjan Nilsen; Adam Sheridan	Laidback Luke (Exclusive); Steve Aoki; Wolfgang Gartner; Sunnery James & Ryan Marciano; Zedd; Swanky Tunes	Groove Armada (DJ Set); A-Trak; Fake Blood; Jaguar Skills; Alex Metric; Burns; Special Guest: Jacques Lu Cont

== 2013 ==
=== Friday ===
That Mixmag Thing	Riva Starr presents Snatch!	Unit7 Presents WRHSmusic
Deniz Koyu; Danny Avila	Duke Dumont; Shadow Child; Riva Starr; Claptone	Russ Chimes; Citizen; Unit 7; T Williams

=== Saturday ===
North Stage	Clublife South Stage	Anjunabeats	Size Matters	Pryda Friends	Annie Mac presents	Hed Kandi Hospitality	It's all gone... Pete Tong	Skream & Benga present	Toolroom
The Prodigy; Madeon; Zane Lowe; Zedd; Borgore; Major Look; Tom Staar	Avicii; Knife Party; Nicky Romero; Nervo; Norman Doray	Above & Beyond; Paul Oakenfold; Arty; Norin & Rad; Andrew Bayer; Gareth Wyn; Rob Harnetty; Gareth Emery	Steve Angello; Benny Benassi; An21; Max Vangeli; Third Party; Tim Mason; Qulinez; Wayne & Woods	Prydz; Marco Carola; Adam Beyer; Maceo Plex; Scuba; George FitzGerald; Fehrplay; Maya Jane Coles	Annie Mac; Julio Bashmore; Eats Everything; Toddla T Sound; Justin Martin; Baauer; Monki; AlunaGeorge; Duke Dumont	Phil Faversham; Carl Hanaghan; Sam Cannon; DJ Eibhlin; Dean Oram; Tom Da Lips	Pete Tong; Solomun; Joris Voorn; David Squillace; Harnan Cattaneo; Hot Since 82; Jaymo & Andy George; Sasha	Skream; Benga; Andy C; Redlight; Rustie; Jack Beats; Alvin Risk; Zinc; Bondax; Clean Bandit; Kidnap Kid; Woz	Mark Knight; Chris Lake; Michael Woods; Doorly; Stefano Noferini; Danny Howard; Paul Bleasdale; Anthony Probyn; Alan Hartley

=== Sunday ===
North Stage	Clublife South Stage	Cream	Richie Hawtin presents Enter	Sebastian Ingrosso presents	Nation
David Guetta; Afrojack; Feed Me; Porter Robinson; Dimitri Vegas & Like Mike; Pegboard Nerds	Tiesto; Steve Angello; Hardwell; Tommy Trash; Alvaro	Paul Van Dyk; Ferry Corsten; John O'Callaghan; Simon Patterson; Jordan Suckley; Adam Sheriden	Richie Hawtin; Loco Dice; Seth Troxler; Gaiser; Paco Osuna; Hobo	Sebastian Ingrosso; Alesso; Otto Knows; Mat Zo; Deniz Koyu; Carli; Armand Van Helden	Groove Armada; A-Trak; Fake Blood; Jaguar Skills; Jac

== 2014 ==
=== Saturday ===
South Stage	North Stage	A State of Trance	Size Matters	Revealed	Pryda	AMP Arena	All Gone Pete Tong	MixMag presents The Residents	Hed Kandi Hospitality
Avicii; Afrojack; Martin Garrix; Cazzette; Rebecca & Fiona; Syn Cole	deadmau5; Steve Aoki; Showtek; Zane Lowe; GTA; Gareth Wyn	Armin van Buuren; Aly & Fila; Cosmic Gate; Andrew Rayel; Ørjan Nilsen; Andrew Rayel; Jochen Miller; MaRLo; David Gravell; Ruben de Ronde	Steve Angello; AN21; Max Vangeli; Third Party; Tim Mason; Qulinez; Dimitri Vangelis & Wyman	Hardwell; W&W; Dyro; Dannic; Deorro; Sick Individuals; Jordy Dazz; Thomas Newson; Julian Calor; Kill The Buzz; Joeysuki; Futuristic Polar Bears; Matt Nash & Dave Silcox	Eric Prydz; Maceo Plex; Scuba; George FitzGerald; Jeremy Olander B2B Fehrplay; Maya Jane Coles	Annie Mac; Skream; Breach; Paul Woolford; Route 94; Friend Within; Karma Kid; Monki	Pete Tong; Sasha; Joris Voorn; Claude VonStroke; Hot Since 82; Justin Martin; Jaymo & Andy George	Paul Bleasdale; Andy Mac; Alan Hartley; Jemmy; Sean Hughes; James Dutton; Ed Mackie; Sam Rice; Paul Dolphin; LilRockit; Paul Nunn & James Glover	Phil Faversham; DJ Eibhlin; Sam Cannon; Phoebe D'Abo; Dean Oram; Tom Lormor

=== Sunday ===
North Stage	South Stage	Departures	MixMag presents	Cream Arena	Super You&Me	LWE Arena	Mistajam presents Speakerbox	Goodgreef Xtra Hard	Hed Kandi Hospitality
Calvin Harris; Fatboy Slim; Dimitri Vegas & Like Mike; NERVO; R3HAB	Tiësto; Hardwell; Tommy Trash; Danny Avila; MOTi	Axwell Λ Ingrosso; Alesso; Dirty South; Otto Knows; Oliver Heldens	Above & Beyond; Duke Dumont; Booka Shade [DJ set]; James Zabiela; Tensnake; Andrew Bayer; RedLight	Paul van Dyk; Ferry Corsten; Markus Schulz; John O'Callaghan; Venom One; Rob Harnetty; Paul Oakenfold	Laidback Luke; Chuckie; DVBBS; Blasterjaxx; D.O.D; Ibranovski & Badd Dimes	Seth Troxler; Adam Beyer; Better Lost Than Stupid; Martin Buttrich; Davide Squillace; Matthias Tanzmann; The Martinez Brothers; Magda	Gorgon City; MK; MistaJam; Jaguar Skills; Shy FX; DJ EZ featuring Majestic; B.Traits (MC Juma); All About She; Wilkinson	Kutski; Tidy Boys; Alex Kidd; Andy Whitby B2B Steve Hill; Mark EG vs Proteus; Cally Gage; Danny Williamson; Shaun T; Phil Mackintosh	Carl Hanaghan; Lucy Stone; Dan Van; Sarah Louise; Dean Oram; Tom Lormor

== 2015 ==
=== Friday ===
Rebel Sound	Armada	Revealed	Paradise	Pepsi Max Arena	Cream Hospitality
Rebel Sound; Sub Focus; Sigma feat. Justyce; Maverick Sabre; Tempa T; CRAZE; DIMENSION; Kove	Armin van Buuren; Andrew Rayel; Cosmic Gate; Ørjan Nilsen; MaRLo; Mark Sixma; Jochen Miller	Hardwell; W&W; Headhunterz; Dannic; Dyro; Sick Individuals; Thomas Newson; Kill The Buzz; Julian Calor	Jamie Jones; The Martinez Brothers; Eats Everything; Richy Ahmed; Mark Jenkyns b2b Russ Yallop	Danny Avila; Deniz Koyu; Tujamo	George Kafetzis; Rob Casson; Adam Wilson; Paul Nunn & James Glover; Aaron Amihere; Ricochet Musica

=== Saturday ===
South Stage	North Stage	Cream	Size	All Gone Pete Tong	Ants	Mistajam Presents Speakerbox	Pepsi Max Arena	Tidy	Cream Hospitality
Avicii; Armin van Buuren; Martin Garrix; Cazzette; ARTY; John Dahlbäck & Albin Myers (Myback)	The Chemical Brothers; Above & Beyond; Annie Mac; Kygo; Thomas Jack	Knife Party; Alesso; Laidback Luke; Tommy Trash; Dillon Francis; Sunnery James & Ryan Marciano; Danny Howard; Kryder; Anton Powers	Steve Angello; Don Diablo; AN21; Max Vangeli; Dimitri Vangelis & Wyman; Third Party; Sebjak; Grum; Promise Land; Adrian Hour	Gorgon City; Pete Tong; Hot Since 82; Joris Voorn; Skream; andhim; Ejeca; Disciples; Icarus	Seth Troxler; Maya Jane Coles; George FitzGerald; Kölsch [DJ set]; Jackmaster; Ben Pearce; Los Suruba; Andrea Oliva	Andy C; High Contrast; Shift K3Y; Blonde; MistaJam; Preditah; Logan Sama b2b Slimzee; Kurupt FM; 99 Souls; Wide Awake; Apexape; Chris Lorenzo	Wilkinson; Philip George; Mike Mago; Redondo; CamelPhat; TCTS; DJ S.K.T.; LilRockit	Tidy Boys; Signum; Andy Whitby; Andy Farley; Maddox & Townend; Rob Tissera; Cally Cage; Trap Two; Max Mozart	Jemmy; Sean Hughes; James Dutton; Josh Demello; Ed Mackie; Alan Hartley; Sean Dougherty; Gussy

=== Sunday ===
South Stage	North Stage	Cream	Fatboy Slim Presents Smile High Club	MK Area 10	Pryda	Pepsi Max Arena	Don't Let Daddy Know	Goodgreef Xtra Hard	Cream Hospitality
Tiësto; Afrojack; DVBBS; Oliver Heldens; MOTi; Dzeko & Torres	Hardwell; Dimitri Vegas & Like Mike; NERVO; Carnage; R3HAB; Gareth Wyn; Steve Aoki	Axwell Λ Ingrosso; Robin Schulz; Tchami; Otto Knows; NEW_ID; Sam Feldt; Tobtok	Fatboy Slim; Duke Dumont; Breach b2b Paul Woolford; The Magician; Destructo; Alex Adair	MK; Cajmere vs Oliver Dollar; Hannah Wants; Lee Foss; Kevin Saunderson; Shadow Child; Toyboy & Robin; Dantiez Saunderson; Beckwith; Pleasure State [live]	Eric Prydz; Maceo Plex; Adam Beyer; Claude VonStroke; Jeremy Olander; Sasha	Paul Oakenfold; Rob Harnetty; Bryan Kearney; Simon Patterson; John O'Callaghan; Aly & Fila; Ferry Corsten; Paul van Dyk	Nicky Romero; Blasterjaxx; Sander van Doorn; Ummet Ozcan; Firebeatz; Bassjackers; Julian Jordan; Sem Vox; Hardman & Deavall; Zawdi MC; Fedde Le Grand	Unit 13; Phil Mackintosh; Shaun T b2b Tone; Energy Syndicate; Argy; JP & Jukesy; Joey Riot; Mark E.G; Kutski; Audiofreq; Audiofreq vs Kutski; Lab 4 Live	Paul Dolphin; Bernie Lee; Adam Cartwright; Sam Rice; Junior J; Andy Mac

== 2016 ==
=== Thursday ===
Cream	Sexy by Nature	Cream Terrace	Cream Hospitality
Eddie Halliwell; Jordan Suckley; Ben Gold; Mark Sherry; Craig Connelly; Venom One	Sunnery James & Ryan Marciano; Kryder; Redondo; Dimitri Vangelis & Wyman; Jack Eye Jones; LilRockit	DJ SKT; Sonny Fodera; Sam Divine; Doorly; Midnight City	Paul Nunn & James Glover; Strictly Underground; Ricochet Musica

=== Friday ===
North Stage	Armada	Paradise	Andy C Presents Ram	Pepsi Max Arena	Cream Hospitality	New Arena
Alesso; Knife Party; NERVO; KSHMR	Armin van Buuren; Andrew Rayel; Ørjan Nilsen; MaRLo; David Gravell; Omnia & Khomha; Ruben de Ronde	Jamie Jones; The Martinez Brothers; Maya Jane Coles; Richy Ahmed; Denney; Robert James	Andy C; Wilkinson; High Contrast; Delta Heavy B2B Loadstar; Dub Phizix & Strategy; Annix; North Base; Roni Size & Krust present Full *Cycle; MCs: Tonn Piper / AD-APT / Stamina MC / Visionobi / Strategy	Bassjackers; Michael Calfan; Third Party; Sam Feldt; Curbi; Tom Zanetti ft. KO Kane; Junior J	Jemmy; George Kafetzis; Adam Cartwright; Bernie Lee; Aaron Amihere	Chase & Status [DJ set]; Cirez D; Martin Solveig; Sigala; Lee Walker

=== Saturday ===
South Stage	North Stage	Cream	Hard Fest presents	Jam Packed	All Gone Pete Tong	Pepsi Max Arena	Ants	Tidy	Cream Hospitality
Avicii; Martin Garrix; Nicky Romero; Otto Knows; Lucas & Steve	Axwell Λ Ingrosso; Dimitri Vegas & Like Mike; DVBBS; Dirty South; Gareth Wyn	Above & Beyond; Robin Schulz; Tchami; Danny Howard; Watermät; Andrew Bayer; Grum; Alan Walker	Jack Ü; Four Tet; Jauz; Destructo; Malaa; Ghastly	DJ EZ; A-Trak; Kurupt FM; Idris Elba; MistaJam; Charlie Sloth; 99 Souls; Logan Sama; Flava D; Sasasas	Pete Tong; Hot Since 82; Eats Everything; Heidi; Christoph; andhim; Steve Lawler	Laidback Luke; Tommy Trash; Sander van Doorn; R3HAB; Firebeatz; Julian Jordan; Will Sparks; Timmy Trumpet; Anton Powers	Gorgon City; Route 94; Ben Pearce; Los Suruba; Andrea Oliva; Yousef	Yomanda; Stimulator; BK; Gammer; Tidy DJs; Freak Brothers; Lee Haslam B2B NG Rezonance; Max Mozart & Audox; Charlie Goddard	Andy Mac; Sean Hughes; James Dutton; Josh Demello; Alan Hartley; Jamie Trippier; Sean Dougherty; Liam Cors; Lee Bullock

=== Sunday ===
North Stage	South Stage	Fatboy Slim Presents Smile High Club	Smash the House	MK Area 10	Pryda	Pepsi Max Arena	Revealed	Goodgreef Xtra Hard	Cream Classics	Cream Hospitality
Calvin Harris; Annie Mac; Duke Dumont; Disciples; Friend Within	Tiësto; Hardwell; Oliver Heldens; Galantis; Don Diablo	Fatboy Slim; Tiga; Erol Alkan; Melé; KDA	Dimitri Vegas & Like Mike; W&W; Ummet Ozcan; WolfPack; MATTN; Steve Aoki	MK; Hannah Wants; Amine Edge & Dance; Lee Foss; Riton; CamelPhat	Eric Prydz; Adam Beyer; Kölsch; George FitzGerald; Alan Fitzpatrick; Sasha	Paul van Dyk; Gareth Emery; Aly & Fila; John O'Callaghan; Brian Kearney; Will Atkinson; Rob Harnetty; Paul Oakenfold	Blasterjaxx; Deorro; Dannic; Thomas Gold; Sick Individuals; Kill The Buzz; Thomas Newson; Julian Calor; Joey Dale; Manse	Andy Whitby; Alex Kidd; Kutski; Dark by Design; Energy Syndicate; Cally; Shaun T; MKN; KRM; Karlston Khaos B2B Cut-Up	Seb Fontaine; K-Klass; Jon Pleased Wimmin; Paul Bleasdale; Andy Carroll; Stuart Hodson B2B Samuel Lamont	Ed Mackie; Corey James; Billie Clements; Chris Wright; Thomas Tuft; Sam Rice; Hardman & Deavall; Gussy

== 2017 ==
=== Thursday ===
Sexy By Nature	Cream	Cream Terrace	Hospitality Arena
Sunnery James & Ryan Marciano; Sam Feldt; Ferreck Dawn; Jack Eye Jones; Lil Rockit	Franky Rizardo; Sam Divine; DJ S.K.T; Sonny Fodera	Philip George; Kideko; George Kwali; Midnight City	Paul Nunn & James Glover; Strictly Underground; Ricochet Musica

=== Friday ===
BBC Radio 1 Stage	Steel Yard	Armada (Mega Arena)	Paradise	Andy C Presents RAM	Pepsi Max	Melbourne Takeover	Hospitality
The Chainsmokers; Annie Mac; Sigma; Danny Howard; Lost Kings	deadmau5 & Eric Prydz (Exclusive Live Show); Dusky; George FitzGerald; Alan Fitzpatrick; Raffa FL; Maya Jane Coles	Armin van Buuren; Andrew Rayel; Cosmic Gate; Ben Gold; Mark Sixma; Rodg; Vini Vici	Jamie Jones; Seth Troxler; Eats Everything; Patrick Topping; Route 94; Russ Yallop	Andy C; Wilkinson; Camo & Krooked; Bad Company UK [DJ set]; Killbox; Culture Shock; LFM; MCs: 2Shy / Tonn Piper / AD-APT / Daxta / Linguistics; Friction	Sander van Doorn; Third Party; Dimitri Vangelis & Wyman; Firebeatz; Julian Jordan; Junior J	Joel Fletcher; Bombs Away; Teddy Cream; Tyron Hapi; Brynny; Brooklyn; Natalie Sax; Nathan Thomson	Jemmy; George Kafetzis; Adam Cartwright; Bernie Lee; Aaron Amihere; Tom Bingham; Mike Catherall

=== Saturday ===
South Stage	North Stage	Mega Arena	Steel Yard Presents SVstem	Mad Decent	Jam Packed	All Gone Pete Tong	Pepsi Max	Keeping The Rave Alive	Hospitality
deadmau5; Armin van Buuren; Oliver Heldens; Martin Solveig	Axwell Λ Ingrosso; Dimitri Vegas & Like Mike; Galantis; Nicky Romero; Marshmello	Above & Beyond; Tchami; Malaa; Grum; Andrew Bayer & Ilan Bluestone; Lost Frequencies	Richie Hawtin - CLOSE (UK *Exclusive Performance); Marco Carola; Loco Dice; Nastia; B.Traits	Diplo; Dillon Francis; Jauz; NGHTMRE; Slander; Ghastly	Stormzy; MistaJam; TQD; P Money; Icarus; Charlie Sloth; Sub Focus	Sven Väth; The Martinez Brothers; Hot Since 82; Solardo; Yotto; Theo Kottis; Black Madonna; Pete Tong	Laidback Luke; Timmy Trumpet; Will Sparks; Tom Zanetti; Anton Powers; Corey James; Son of 8; DVBBS	Kutski; DJ Isaac; Darren Styles; Scott Brown; Argy; Big Worm; Fracture; Obsession	Andy Mac; Sean Hughes; James Dutton; Josh Demello; Alan Hartley; Jamie Trippier; Sean Dougherty; Liam Cors; Lee Bullock

=== Sunday ===
North Stage	South Stage	Creamfields Presents Sub_Aural	Mega Arena	Steel Yard Presents Pryda	MK Area 10	Yousef Presents Circus	Pepsi Max	Goodgreef Xtra Hard	Cream Classics	Hospitality
Tiësto; Hardwell; Don Diablo	Martin Garrix; Fatboy Slim; Steve Angello; Faithless [DJ set]	Chase & Status (DJ Set); Pendulum [DJ set]; DJ EZ; Hannah Wants; High Contrast; DIMENSION; Northbase; Goldie	Alesso; Duke Dumont; Disciples; Sigala; Jax Jones; Alok; KSHMR	Eric Prydz; Adam Beyer; Kölsch [DJ set]; Cristoph; Sasha	MK; Idris Elba; Claptone; CamelPhat; KC Lights; TCTS; Gorgon City	Luciano; Joris Voorn; Jackmaster; Yousef; Lewis Boardman; Ki Creighton	Paul van Dyk; Ferry Corsten; Aly & Fila; John O’Callaghan; Bryan Kearney; Ben Nicky; Will Atkinson; Rob Harnetty; Paul Oakenfold	Max Enforcer; Alex Kidd; Andy Whitby; Klubfiller & MC Storm; MKN; Shaun T; Phil Mackintosh; Toxic vs Oppozite Twinz; Reklus; Halestone	Judge Jules; Seb Fontaine; K-Klass; Jon Pleased Wimmin; Paul Bleasdale; Andy Carroll; Samuel Lamont B2B Stuart Hodson	Ed Mackie; Billie Clements; Chris Wright; Thomas Tuft; Sam Rice; Hardman & Deavall; Mr Cousens; Rich Furness

== 2018 ==
=== Thursday ===
Sexy By Nature	Cream	Cream Terrace	Hospitality Arena
Sunnery James & Ryan Marciano; Kryder; Bruno Martini; Jack Eye Jones	DJ S.K.T; Kideko; George Kwali; Michael Calfan; Nathan Dawe	Philip George; D.O.D; Kris Kross Amsterdam; Jack Wins; LilRockit; Joel Rogers	Paul Nunn & James Glover; Strictly Underground; Ricochet Musica

=== Friday ===
Sick Boy Stage	Steel Yard Presents Intec	Armada	Sub_Aural Arena	Paradise	Andy C Presents RAM	Blow	Pepsi Max	Keeping The Rave Alive	Hospitality Arena
The Chainsmokers; Sigma; Martin Solveig; Sigala	Carl Cox; Nicole Moudaber; Darren Emerson; Carlo Lio; Jon Rundell; Fabio Neural	Armin van Buuren; W&W; Fedde Le Grand; David Gravell; DubVision; Vini Vici	Chase & Status [DJ set]; Kurupt FM; Matrix & Futurebound; Klose One; Understate; Hannah Wants	Jamie Jones; Joseph Capriati; Green Velvet; Patrick Topping; Richy Ahmed; Mark Jenkyns	Andy C; Wilkinson [DJ set]; Roni Size; Rene Lavice; Sound In Noise; SaSaSaS; MCs: Tonn Piper, AD-APT, 2Shy	CamelPhat; Sonny Fodera; Dennis Cruz; Mihalis Safras; Pirupa	Sander van Doorn; Ummet Ozcan; Dimitri Vangelis & Wyman; Firebeatz; Julian Jordan; Junior J; Will Sparks	Kutski; Code Black; Darren Styles; Joey Riot; MKN; AV18; Obsession; Danny Burch	Anthony Probyn; Jemmy; Andy Joyce; Adam Cartwright; Bernie Lee; Mike Catherall; Danny Whitehead; Aaron Amihere; Jono Robertson; Brad Hogan

=== Saturday ===
Horizon Stage	Arc Stage	Mega Arena	Steel Yard	Mad Decent	Jam Packed	All Gone Pete Tong	Pepsi Max	Melbourne Bounce	303	Rong	Hospitality Arena
Major Lazer; Annie Mac; Giggs; Disciples	Axwell Λ Ingrosso; Dimitri Vegas & Like Mike; Galantis; Timmy Trumpet; Nicky Romero	Above & Beyond; Steve Angello [live]; Virtual Self; Danny Howard; Grum; Spencer Brown; Oliver Smith; Gareth Wyn	Marco Carola; Loco Dice; Alan Fitzpatrick; CamelPhat; Sasha & John Digweed	Diplo; Dillon Francis; A-Trak; Valentino Khan; Party Favor; Ape Drums	Krept & Konan; MistaJam; Ramz; Holy Goof; Darkzy; JayKae; Friend Within; Sir Spyro; Conducta; Mollie Collins; Sian Anderson feat. Big Jabba *Jones; Sammy Porter; DOBBY; Stefflon Don	Luciano; Pete Tong; Hot Since 82; Joris Voorn; Skream; Mason Collective; The Black Madonna	Laidback Luke; Benny Benassi; Tom Zanetti & K.O Kane; Bassjackers; MATTN; Ben Nicky	Teddy Cream; Joel Fletcher; Sunset Bros; Natalie Sax	Leftfield [DJ set]; James Zabiela; Dave Seaman; Justin Robertson; Samuel Lamont; Kenny Muir	Solarstone; Giuseppe Ottaviani; Menno de Jong; Alex M.O.R.P.H.; ReOrder; Shugz; Liam Wilson & Dan Dobson; Rong Residents: Pete Bromage, *Jamie Cooper & B.Vis	Andy Mac; Sean Hughes; James Dutton; Josh Demello; Alan Hartley; Jamie Trippier; Liam Cors; Lee Bullock; Jon Coburn; Ian McGaw

=== Sunday ===
Arc Stage	Horizon Stage	Steel Yard presents Pryda	Mega Arena	MK Area10	Sub_Aural	Circus	Pepsi Max	Goodgreef Xtra Hard	Cream Classics	Hospitality Arena
Tiësto; Hardwell; Don Diablo; Mike Williams	Martin Garrix; Fatboy Slim; Oliver Heldens; Faithless [DJ set]; Lost Frequencies; Justin Mylo	Eric Prydz presents HOLO; Adam Beyer; Kölsch; Dusky; Cristoph	Alesso; Tchami x Malaa (No Redemption); Sunnery James & Ryan Marciano; Third Party; Anton Powers; Duke Dumont	MK; Armand van Helden; Idris Elba; Detlef; Eli & Fur; KC Lights; Groove Armada [DJ set]	Rudimental [DJ set]; Sub Focus; Goldie; High Contrast; Friction; DIMENSION; Majestic; North Base	Sven Väth; Eats Everything; Yousef; Solardo; Lewis Boardman; Ki Creighton; Maya Jane Coles	Paul van Dyk; Ferry Corsten; Aly & Fila; John O’Callaghan; Bryan Kearney; John 00 Fleming; Rob Harnetty; Paul Oakenfold	Scot Project; Alex Kidd; Andy Whitby; Organ Donors (Ultrasound Album Set); Rob Tissera; Klubfiller & MC Storm; Energy Syndicate (10 Years Showcase); Shaun T; Reklus; Phil Mackintosh; Hosted by MC Finchy	Seb Fontaine; Tall Paul; K-Klass; Tilt; Paul Bleasdale; Andy Carroll; George Kafetzis & Rue Jay; Ricco	Ed Mackie; Billie Clements; Chris Wright; Thomas Tuft; Mr Cousens; Sam Rice; Hardman & Devall; Darren Donnelly; Jae Holmes

== 2019 ==
=== Friday ===
Arc	BBC Radio 1 Stage	Steel Yard presents Intec	Anjunbeats	Warehouse presents All Gone Pete Tong	Generator: Seven20 x Maustrap	Sub_Aural	Pepsi Max	Rong	Creamfields Inferno
Calvin Harris; MK; Duke Dumont	The Chemical Brothers; Annie Mac; Denis Sulta; MistaJam	Carl Cox; Nicole Moudaber; Pan-Pot; Umek; Christian Varela; Sidney Charles; Jon Rundell; Saytek; Christopher Coe	Above & Beyond; Ilan Bluestone; Gabriel & Dresden; Grum; Spencer Brown; Oliver Smith; Genix; Tinlicker; Amy Wiles	Bicep [DJ set]; The Black Madonna; Hot Since 82; Pete Tong; La Fleur; Peggy Gou; Joris Voorn	Feed Me; REZZ; testpilot; I_O; Rinzen; ATTLAS; Gallya; Callie Reiff; Livsey; Jay Robinson; Killa Hz; Gooey Vuitton; Ami Carmine	Chase & Status [DJ set]; Crucast; Wilkinson [DJ set]; High Contrast; Matrix & Futurebound; Yakö; Understate	Laidback Luke; Third Party; Benny Benassi; Bassjackers; MATTN; Dillon Francis	Gareth Emery; Bryan Kearney; John Askew; Will Atkinson; Estiva; Liam Wilson; Pete Bromage; B. Viss; Jamie Cooper; Mauro Picotto	Afrojack; Nicky Romero; Noisecontrollers; TNT aka Technoboy 'n' Tuneboy; Dimitri Vangelis & Wyman; Maurice West; Blastoyz

=== Saturday ===
Arc	Generator	Steel Yard	Warehouse presents Paradise	Andy C Presents	Freakshow	Silo presents Exhale	Pepsi Max	Goodgref Xtra Hard
deadmau5; Tchami; Fatboy Slim	Martin Garrix; Holy Goof; Jauz; Malaa; Dyro; Bart B More; TV Noise	Eric Prydz presents VOID; Solardo; Dusky	Jamie Jones; Patrick Topping; Green Velvet; Richy Ahmed; Darius Syrossian; Lauren Lo Sung	Andy C; Shy FX; DIMENSION; Culture Shock; Randall; Upgrade B2B Limited; Harriet Jaxxon; Magnetude; MCs: Tonn Piper, GQ, IC3, ID	Timmy Trumpet; Will Sparks; MaRLo; Sub Zero Project; Teddy Cream; Ben Nicky	Amelie Lens; Len Faki; Marcel Dettmann; Joyhauser	Ferry Corsten; Eddie Halliwell; John O'Callaghan; Ørjan Nilsen; Ruben de Ronde; Ciaran McAuley; Daxson	Brennan Heart; Head Hunterz; Da Tweekaz; Radical Redemption; Alex Kidd; Andy Whitby; Shaun T; Reklus; Phil Mackintosh

=== Sunday ===
Arc	Horizon	Steel Yard	Generator present Blow	Warehouse	MK Area 10	Sub_Aural	Pepsi Max	Keeping the Rave Alive	Silo presents Cream Classics
Swedish House Mafia	Dimitri Vegas & Like Mike; Faithless [DJ set]; Oliver Heldens; Tiësto; Sunnery James & Ryan Marciano; Carta	Cirez D & Adam Beyer; Kölsch; B.Traits; Cristoph; Enrico Sanguiliano	CamelPhat; FISHER; Paul Woolford; Melé; Mason Maynard; Heidi	Alan Fitzpatrick; Helena Hauff; Joseph Capriati; Marco Carola; Joey Daniel; Hector	Gorgon City; Sonny Fodera; MK; Weiss; Mason Collective; Nightlapse	Hannah Wants; Danny Howard; Sam Divine	Paul van Dyk; Aly & Fila; Cosmic Gate; Giuseppe Ottaviani; Solarstone; Craig Connelly; Paul Thomas; Rob Harnetty	Coone; Kutski; Darren Styles; Joey Riot; MKN; Cally; Crystal Mad; Callum Higby; Obsession	Seb Fontaine; Tall Paul; K-Klass; X-Press 2; Paul Bleasdale; Andy Carroll; Stuart Hodson & Samuel Lamont; George Kafetzis; Rue Jay; Ricco

== 2020 ==
The 2020 edition of Creamfields was cancelled due to the COVID-19 pandemic. Artists announced prior to the cancellation include:

- Above & Beyond
- Adam Beyer
- Alesso
- Andy C
- ANNA
- Armin van Buuren
- Basement Jaxx [DJ set]
- B. Traits
- Ben Nicky
- Bicep [live]
- Boris Brejcha
- Brennan Heart
- Calvin Harris
- CamelPhat
- Carl Cox
- Charlotte De Witte
- Chase & Status [DJ set]
- Cristoph
- D‐Block & S‐Te‐Fan
- Darren Styles
- deadmau5
- Denis Sulta
- Dimitri Vegas & Like Mike
- Disciples
- Enrico Sangiuliano
- Eric Prydz
- Example
- Ferry Corsten
- FISHER
- Gareth Emery
- Gorgon City
- Hannah Wants
- Holy Goof
- Hybrid Minds
- Jamie Jones
- Jauz
- Jax Jones
- Joseph Capriati
- Kölsch
- Laidback Luke
- La Fleur
- Marco Carola
- Martin Garrix
- MATTN
- Michael Bibi
- Miss K8
- MK
- Nina Kraviz
- Oliver Heldens
- Patrick Topping
- Pendulum – TRINITY
- Pete Tong
- Sam Divine
- Scooter
- Simon Dunmore
- Skream
- Sound Rush
- Sub Focus
- Sub Zero Project
- Sonny Fodera
- Sven Väth
- The Chainsmokers
- Tiësto
- Timmy Trumpet
- Vini Vici
- W&W
- Wildstylez
- Zatox
