= Cukierman =

Cukierman is a Jewish surname, spelled in the Polish way, parallel to the Yiddish/German Jewish surname Zukerman. Notable people with the surname include:

- Cécile Cukierman (born 1976), French politician
- Daniel Cukierman (born 1995), Israeli tennis player
- Edouard Cukierman (born 1965), French-Israeli businessman
- Icchak Cukierman (1915–1981), one of the leaders of the Warsaw Ghetto Uprising 1943
- Josef Cukierman (1899–1940) Polish-born French chess master
- Roger Cukierman (born 1936), French banker, businessman, and Jewish philanthropist

== See also ==
- Zuckermann
- Zukerman
