= Allison Zuckerman =

American contemporary artist and painter (born 1990)

- Education: Master of Fine Arts, University of Pennsylvania, School of the Art Institute of Chicago
- Known for: Painting
- Website: allisonzuckerman.com

Allison Zuckerman (born 1990) is an American contemporary artist and painter. Zuckerman's pop-surrealist work fuses painting with digital printing techniques and appropriates various art historical tropes and references to "recast the submissive, romanticized female muses painted by male artists throughout Western art history as commanding, empowered figures." Zuckerman creates an alternative narrative by remixing the female sitters of prominent male artists into a feminist 21st century.

== Early life and education ==
Zuckerman grew up in Harrisburg, Pennsylvania. She completed a BA at the University of Pennsylvania (2012) and an MFA at the School of the Art Institute of Chicago (2015).

Zuckerman attended the Yale Norfolk Summer School of Art (2011).

== Work and exhibitions ==
Zuckerman's first solo exhibition, "Act Natural", opened at Kravets Wehby Gallery in 2017.

Zuckerman was the artist-in-residence at the Rubell Family Collection during the summer of 2017. During this time, she created work for her first museum solo show "Stranger in Paradise" which opened December 6, 2017 at the Rubell Family Collection in Wynwood, Miami during Art Basel Miami Beach week. Zuckerman used "paint and digitally manipulated printed images to create hybridized portraits suffused with cultural and societal critiques." Michael Darling and Tami Katz-Freiman were contributing authors for the exhibition catalogue.

Zuckerman's second museum solo show, "Pirate and Muse," opened October 27, 2018 at the Akron Art Museum. Jeremy Scott, Creative Director of Moschino, wrote the foreword for the exhibition's catalogue. Zuckerman's figures are amalgams of body parts, clothing and background elements from artists [all male] throughout history, and Disney and other pop culture imagery."

"She uses elements of Picasso’s style", Cézanne, and Matisse within many of her paintings.

The Pizzuti Collection featured Zuckerman's work in the group show "Go Figure", "an exhibition that investigates the human form in both a tender and provocative approach" in 2018.
In 2020, Zuckerman's exhibition "Paper Doll" opened at Kravets Wehby Gallery. In this body of work, published in Vogue Italia’s November 2019 issue, Allison Zuckerman interpreted the yet-to-be-released clothing line from Louis Vuitton. Zuckerman has continued her collaboration with Vogue Italia, creating an 8-page spread featuring 8 different designers, for the January 2021 issue, "Zootopia".

Zuckerman designed the cover art for "i finally understand" by Charli XCX, released on 7 May 2020 as the third single from her upcoming fourth studio album how i'm feeling now. She worked with Tods in March 2021 to promote their Shirt Bag.

== Awards ==
- 2015: George and Ann Siegel Award, MFA Fellowship Competition, SAIC
