= Creamfields =

English annual dance music festival held in Cheshire

Coordinates: 53.34°N 2.63°W

- Genre: Electronic dance music
- Dates: North: August Bank Holiday Weekend; South: Late May Bank Holiday Weekend (Note: On its first year in 2022, Creamfields South took place during the Platinum Jubilee weekend in June.)
- Locations: Main location UK: Winchester, Hampshire (1998); Liverpool, Merseyside (1999–2005); Daresbury, Cheshire (2006–present); For spin offs see here
- Years active: 1998–present
- Founders: Cream
- Attendance: 280,000
- Capacity: 70,000
- Organiser: Live Nation
- Website: Official website

Creamfields is an electronic dance music festival series founded and organised by British club promoter Cream, with its UK edition taking place on August Bank Holiday weekend, with a number of international editions held across various territories worldwide.

First held in 1998 in Winchester, the festival moved to Cream's home city of Liverpool the following year, taking place on the old Liverpool airport, before moving to its current location on the Daresbury estate in Cheshire. The festival, having initially begun as a one-day event with 25,000 people in attendance, is now a four-day event with camping options hosting 70,000 per day. The festival is the UK's most prestigious electronic dance music festival.

In 2022, Creamfields celebrated its 25th anniversary by launching a second UK-based festival – Creamfields South. Creamfields South took place at Hylands Park, Chelmsford across the Platinum Jubilee weekend in June and is returned in 2023, with the original Daresbury festival being renamed Creamfields North. However, from 2024 the festival had reverted to one location in the north.

== History ==
Creamfields initially began in 1998 as a one-day annual event run by the Liverpool night club Cream. This first edition was held in Winchester, Hampshire, and attracted 25,000 people. The following year Creamfields moved to the old Liverpool Airfield in Liverpool, Merseyside. The move put the festival closer to its parent night club and the new site was able to hold 50,000 people. In 2016, Cream was demolished; however, the brand continued to run the festival. In 2006 the festival moved outside the city to its current location in Daresbury, Cheshire. On the 10th anniversary of the festival it expanded to a two-day event, with 50,000 people attending across the weekend. The festival site expanded over the next few years after its first sellout in 2009 of 60,000 across the weekend. In 2010, the site was expanded to accommodate additional ticket sales and growing demand from campers. The festival sold 80,000 tickets in 2010 and 100,000 in 2011.

In 2012 the festival ownership changed hands as Cream was bought out by Live Nation, the current organisers of the event. The festival was set to expand to a three-day event, but on the final day the festival was abandoned because of heavy rain. The following year the organisers invested £500,000 in the site to protect it against bad weather. The three-day event allowed an attendance of 150,000. 2014 saw the edition of a second primary stage, the North and South Stage; and in 2015, the festival was live streamed for the first time, to 500,000 online attendees. The Steel Yard stage was introduced in 2016, spawning a spinoff mini-festival with events held in Liverpool and London; the same year, the festival become a four-day event with site expansion in 2017 allowing for a maximum attendance of 280,000. In 2019, £2,000,000 was invested to improve security and safety and to reduce environmental impact. The festival hosted Swedish House Mafia in their Save the World Reunion Tour, the supergroup's first UK show since 2012; the group were the sole occupants of the festival's iconic Arc Stage on the day of the event.

The 2020 edition of the festival was cancelled because of the COVID-19 pandemic, with a virtual festival taking its place. Following Boris Johnson's announcement on the 22 February regarding the road out of the UK's COVID-19 lockdown, Creamfields announced that the 2021 edition would go ahead. Tickets for the event sold out in record time.

A second UK-based festival – Creamfields South – was introduced in 2022 at Hylands Park in Chelmsford, hosting headline acts such as David Guetta and Calvin Harris. Organisers said that they expected the festival to continue and become 'a solid and regular fixture on the UK festival circuit', with Creamfields South confirmed to be returning for 2023. However, after just two editions, in September 2023 Live Nation announced that the Chelmsford event would be discontinued. Rather than holding separate North and South events in 2024, Creamfields consolidated into a single massive four‑day festival at Daresbury, Cheshire. The South edition was officially ended and merged back into the main North location from August 2024 onwards.

The 2026 edition took place from 27 to 30 August at Daresbury, Cheshire, with performances from artists including Disclosure, Swedish House Mafia, Calvin Harris and Martin Garrix.

=== Edition's summary ===
Nb: Artists shown in the table below were headliners for the event. For full line-ups see List of Creamfields line-ups.

Year	Venue	Dates	Attendance (Note: These attendance figures are for the whole weekend, therefore attendees with multi-day passes will be counted per day of their pass.)	Headliners	Ref.
1998	Winchester, Hampshire	2 May	25,000	Sasha, Paul van Dyk, Daft Punk, Tony De Vit.	
1999	Liverpool, Merseyside	28 August	50,000	Pet Shop Boys, Basement Jaxx.	
2000	Liverpool, Merseyside	26 August	50,000	Judge Jules, Groove Armada, Basement Jaxx, Moloko, Laurent Garnier.	
2001	Liverpool, Merseyside	25 August	50,000	No artists declared headliners	
2002	Liverpool, Merseyside	24 August	50,000	Faithless, Underworld, Kosheen.	
2003	Liverpool, Merseyside	23 August	50,000	Paul Oakenfold, Erick Morillo, Harry Romero, Audio Bullys.	
2004	Liverpool, Merseyside	28 August	50,000	The Chemical Brothers, Goldfrapp, Mylo, Scratch Perverts.	
2005	Liverpool, Merseyside	27 August	50,000	Basement Jaxx, Faithless, Caged Baby.	
2006	Daresbury, Cheshire	26 August	50,000	The Prodigy, Gnarls Barkley, Goldfrapp, The Zutons.	
2007	Daresbury, Cheshire	25 August	50,000	The Chemical Brothers, Groove Armada, Kelis, Mark Ronson, Carl Cox.	
2008	Daresbury, Cheshire	23 and 24 August	50,000	Fatboy Slim, Ian Brown, Gossip, Paul van Dyk, Kasabian, Tiësto, Paul Oakenfold, David Guetta.	
2009	Daresbury, Cheshire	29 and 30 August	60,000	Tiësto, Mylo, Basement Jaxx, Paul van Dyk, Dizzee Rascal.	
2010	Daresbury, Cheshire	28 and 29 August	80,000	David Guetta, deadmau5, Leftfield, Tiësto, Calvin Harris, Paul van Dyk, Swedish House Mafia.	
2011	Daresbury, Cheshire	27 and 28 August	100,000	The Chemical Brothers, Tiësto, Paul van Dyk, David Guetta, Swedish House Mafia	
2012	Daresbury, Cheshire	24, 25, and 26 August (Note: The festival was abandoned on the 26 August because of heavy rain.)	100,000	Avicii, David Guetta, Sebastian Ingrosso, Steve Angello, Skrillex, deadmau5, Tiësto, Calvin Harris, Axwell.	
2013	Daresbury, Cheshire	23, 24, and 25 August	150,000	The Prodigy, Avicii, Tiësto, David Guetta, Steve Angello, Sebastian Ingrosso, Above & Beyond, Paul van Dyk.	
2014	Daresbury, Cheshire	22, 23, and 24 August	150,000	Aly & Fila, Armin van Buuren, Avicii, deadmau5, Steve Aoki, Calvin Harris, Hardwell, Paul van Dyk, Tiësto.	
2015	Daresbury, Cheshire	28, 29, and 30 August	150,000	Armin van Buuren, Hardwell, Jamie Jones, Martin Garrix, The Chemical Brothers, Avicii, Knife Party, Alesso.	
2016	Daresbury, Cheshire	25, 26, 27, and 28 August	200,000	Armin van Buuren, Chase & Status, Dimitri Vegas & Like Mike, Axwell Λ Ingrosso, Avicii, Martin Garrix, Calvin Harris.	
2017	Daresbury, Cheshire	24, 25, 26, and 27 August	280,000	deadmau5, Dimitri Vegas & Like Mike, Armin van Buuren, Axwell Λ Ingrosso, Eric Prydz, Tiësto, Martin Garrix, Hardwell	
2018	Daresbury, Cheshire	23, 24, 25, and 26 August	280,000	Carl Cox, Armin van Buuren, The Chainsmokers, Axwell Λ Ingrosso, Giggs, Tiësto, Hardwell, Eric Prydz, Fatboy Slim, Adam Beyer.	
2019	Daresbury, Cheshire	22, 23, 24, and 25 August	280,000	deadmau5, Martin Garrix, Carl Cox, Calvin Harris, The Chemical Brothers, Swedish House Mafia.	
2020	Daresbury, Cheshire	27, 28, 29, and 30 August	0 (Cancelled because of the COVID-19 pandemic)	Armin van Buuren, Pendulum, CamelPhat, The Chainsmokers, Calvin Harris, Carl Cox, Nina Kraviz, deadmau5, Charlotte de Witte, Dimitri Vegas & Like Mike.	
2021	Daresbury, Cheshire	26, 27, 28, and 29 August	TBA	David Guetta, Carl Cox, Eric Prydz, Martin Garrix, Adam Beyer, Tiësto, Laidback Luke	
2022	Daresbury, Cheshire	25, 26, 27 and 28 August	TBA	Calvin Harris, David Guetta, Martin Garrix, Armin van Buuren, Tiësto, Camelphat, Carl Cox, Nina Kraviz, Belters Only, Above and Beyond, Scooter, Charlotte de Witte	

== Album ==
On 9 August 2004, British DJ Paul Oakenfold released his fifteenth DJ Mix album entitled Creamfields. The album was released in advance of the sixth edition of the festival in 2004 of which Oakenfold was due to perform. The album itself is third in a series of remix album with the other two being made by other DJs. In 2019, Oakenfold released a further DJ mix album to celebrate the festival's twentieth anniversary.

== Creamfields: Steel Yard ==
The 2016 edition of Creamfields saw the debut of the Steel Yard stage at the main event in Daresbury, Cheshire. The stage is a 15,000 capacity super structure designed and built by Acorn Events.

Steel Yard Liverpool made its debut in 2016 at the city's Clarence Graving Dock, and now occurs annually in late November or early December.

Steel Yard London initially took place in late October at Victoria Park, London in 2017, before moving to Finsbury Park for 2018 and 2019 respectively, with a new date on the late-May bank holiday weekend.

In 2018, Steel Yard Liverpool partnered with Tomorrowland and Dimitri Vegas & Like Mike to bring "Garden of Madness" to the UK for a special one-off event.

== Creamfields International ==
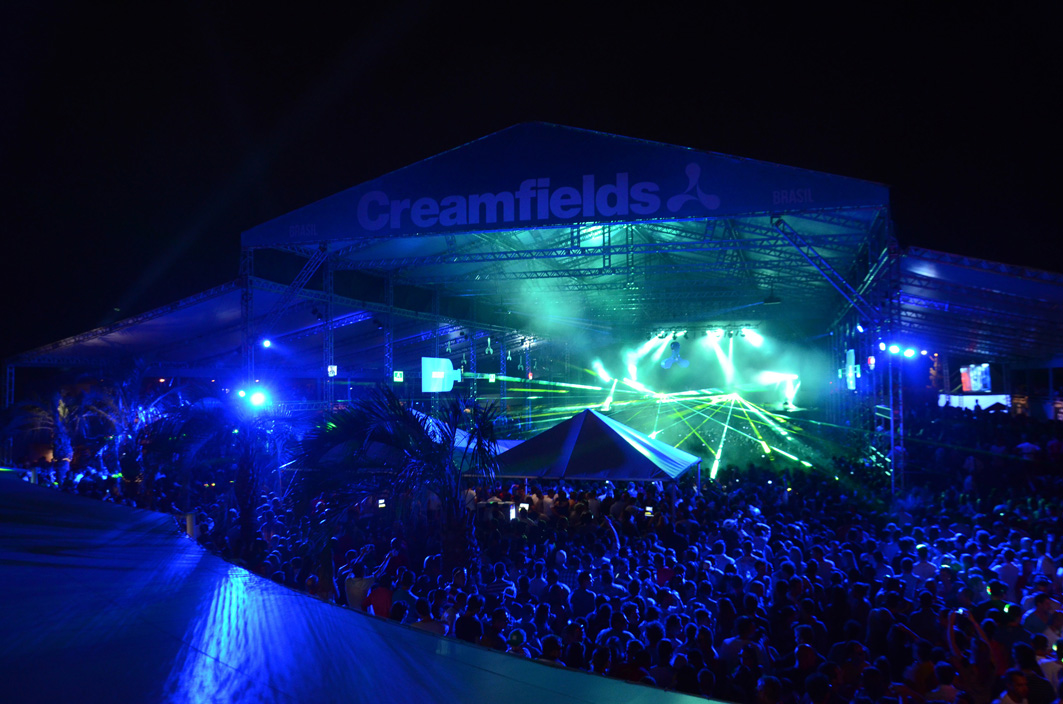
Creamfields Brazil, 2013

In addition to the two main UK events, Creamfields also operates a number of international spin offs including:

- Creamfields Abu Dhabi
- Creamfields Australia (2010–2012; 2017)
- Creamfields Brazil
- Creamfields Buenos Aires (2001–2015; 2024–present)
- Creamfields Czech Republic (2002)
- Creamfields Chile (2004–2018; 2022–present)
- Creamfields China (2018–present)
- Creamfields Colombia
- Creamfields Hong Kong (2017–present)
- Creamfields Ibiza
- Creamfields Ireland (2000–2002)
- Creamfields Mallorca
- Creamfields Malta
- Creamfields Mexico
- Creamfields Romania
- Creamfields Paraguay
- Creamfields Poland (2003 – Kołobrzeg, 2006–2008 – Wrocław)
- Creamfields Portugal
- Creamfields Peru
- Creamfields Russia (2005)
- Creamfields Spain
- Creamfields Taiwan (2017–present)
- Creamfields Thailand (2022–present)
- Creamfields Turkey
- Creamfields Ukraine
- Creamfields Vietnam

== Awards and nominations ==
=== DJ Awards ===
Year	Category	Work	Result	Ref.
2014	Special Award – Best International Dance Music Festival	Creamfields – UK	Won	

=== DJ Magazine's top 50 Festivals ===
Year	Category	Work	Result	Ref.
2019	World's Best Festival	Creamfields – Liverpool, UK	13th	

=== Festicket Awards ===
Year	Category	Work	Result	Ref.
2016	Best EDM/Dance Festival	Creamfields	3rd	

=== International Dance Music Awards ===
Year	Category	Work	Result	Ref.
2011	Best Music Event	Creamfields – Liverpool, UK	Nominated	
2016	Best Music Event	Creamfields – Liverpool, UK	Nominated	

=== UK Festival Awards ===
Year	Category	Work	Result	Ref.
2004	Best Dance Festival	Creamfields UK	Won	
2005	Best Dance Festival	Creamfields UK	Won	
2008	Best Major Festival	Creamfields UK	Nominated	
2008	Best Dance Festival	Creamfields UK	Nominated	
2009	Best Dance Festival	Creamfields UK	Won	
2010	Best Dance Festival	Creamfields UK	Won	
2011	Best Dance Festival	Creamfields UK	Won	
2013	Best Dance Festival	Creamfields UK	Won	
2014	Best Dance Festival	Creamfields UK	Won	
2015	Best Major Festival	Creamfields UK	Nominated	
2015	Best Dance Festival	Creamfields UK	Won	
2016	Best Major Festival	Creamfields UK	Won	

== See also ==
- List of electronic music festivals
- List of Creamfields line-ups
- Creamfields Australia
- Creamfields BA
