= Zucker =

Zucker is a German word meaning "sugar" and may refer to:

- Zucker (surname)
- Zücker, an album by the Fastbacks
- Zucker (Rosenstolz album), an album by Rosenstolz
- Zucker laboratory rat breed

== See also ==
- Zucker, Abrahams and Zucker, a comedy filmmaking trio
- Zuker, a surname
- Alles auf Zucker!, a German comedy film, released internationally in 2004
- Zuckermann
