= Zukerman =

Zukerman is a surname. Notable people with the surname include:

- Arianna Zukerman (b. 1972), American singer, daughter of Eugenia and Pinchas
- Ashley Zukerman (b. 1983), Australian-American actor
- Eli Zuckerman (b. 1973), Israeli sailor
- Eugenia Rich Zukerman (b. 1944), American flutist, writer, and journalist
- Gal Zukerman (b. 2003), Israeli kite foiler
- George Zukerman (b. 1927), Canadian bassoonist and impresario
- Natalia Zukerman (b. 1975), American artist and musician, daughter of Eugenia and Pinchas
- Pinchas Zukerman (b. 1948), Israeli-American violinist and conductor
- Wendy Zukerman, Australian-American science journalist and podcaster

== See also ==
- Zukerman Chamber Players, classical music ensemble
- Zuckermann
- Cukierman
