= Adrian Zuckerman =

British legal scholar

Adrian A. S. Zuckerman

Adrian A. S. Zuckerman is a British legal scholar. He is Professor of Civil Procedure at the University of Oxford and editor of the Civil Justice Quarterly

Zuckerman is the author of Principles of Criminal Evidence (1989), Justice in Crisis: Comparative Perspectives of Civil Procedure (1999), and Zuckerman on Civil Procedure: Principles of Practice (3rd edition 2013). He is co-author with Paul Roberts of Criminal Evidence (3rd edition 2013), and co-editor with Ross Cranston of Reform of Civil Procedure: Essays on "Access to Justice" (1996). He is also the author of the "Annual Survey of Civil Procedure," published each year in the All England Law Reports Annual Review.

He was an advisor to Lord Woolf's Access to Justice inquiry in 1996, and runs the Civil and Public Litigation (Procedure) course for the LLM degree at University College London. In June 2011 it was announced he would join the professoriate of New College of the Humanities, a private college in London.

He was appointed as an honorary King's Counsel in 2025.
