= Mark S. Zuckerberg =

American bankruptcy lawyer

- Born: Mark Steven Zuckerberg
- Occupation: Bankruptcy lawyer
- Website: iammarkzuckerberg.com

Mark Steven Zuckerberg (born 1961 or 1962) is an American bankruptcy lawyer. The resemblance of his name to Mark Elliot Zuckerberg, founder of Facebook, has had a significant impact on his everyday life.

== Career ==
Zuckerberg is from Indianapolis, Indiana. As a bankruptcy lawyer, Zuckerberg has represented clients in that capacity. He has also written books about consumer law. Zuckerberg occasionally has speaking engagements regarding his expertise in consumer bankruptcy. He is not related to Mark Elliot Zuckerberg.

Zuckerberg had his own website by 2004 and it had a stronger web presence at the time than his counterpart. He remembers the other Mark Zuckerberg announcing his acceptance to Harvard University online. After Facebook was launched, Zuckerberg had to provide several forms of identity documents in order to register a personal account. In 2011, this account was deactivated by mistake, while his business page remained active. He considers a strong business presence in his field to be important since bankruptcy is "usually a one-and-done type of thing".

Zuckerberg is critical of Facebook, which he has blamed for causing his divorce. Since Zuckerberg is more accessible than the Facebook founder, people frequently contact him instead. He receives daily inquiries of this nature. This confusion has had a major impact on his personal life. Businesses have assumed him to be a prank caller, he was once mistakenly named as a defendant in a suit filed by the state of Washington, and he has received death threats. When an Internet hoax claimed that the Facebook founder was giving away millions of dollars, Zuckerberg's law office was bombarded with calls.

== Meta lawsuit ==
In September 2025, Zuckerberg filed a lawsuit against Meta Platforms alleging that it broke contractual obligations for removing advertising about his business after he had already paid for it, comparing the situation to someone putting a blanket over a billboard. He also stated that his account had been deactivated a total of five times and alleged that this had cost him business opportunities. He hoped that the lawsuit would resolve the recurring issue of deactivated accounts. Zuckerberg asked for reimbursement of his lawyer's fees and the IT team he hired to go through "Facebook's lengthy appeals process" which could take months to resolve.

== See also ==
- Lawsuits involving Meta Platforms
- Identity theft
