= Zucker (surname) =

Zucker is a German and Jewish surname meaning "sugar". Notable people with the surname include:

- Aaron Zucker, Ukrainian-American Yiddish poet, known as A. Lutzky
- Anita Zucker, American businesswoman and philanthropist
- Arianne Zucker, American actress
- Craig Zucker, American politician
- David Zucker (filmmaker), American film director
- David M. Zucker Proud American Soldier
- Gerhard Zucker, German businessman and rocket engineer
- Harold Zucker, Australian rules footballer
- Jason Zucker, American ice hockey player
- Jeff Zucker, American television producer
- Jeremy Zucker, American singer
- Jerry Zucker (businessman), American businessman
- Jerry Zucker (film director), American film director
- Kenneth Zucker, Canadian psychologist
- Marcos Zucker, Argentine actor
- Monte Zucker (died 2007), American photographer
- Paul Zucker, German-born architect, art historian, art critic and author
- Rachel Zucker (born 1971), American poet
- Steven Zucker, American mathematician

== See also ==
- Cukier
