= List of songs recorded by Nadia Ali =

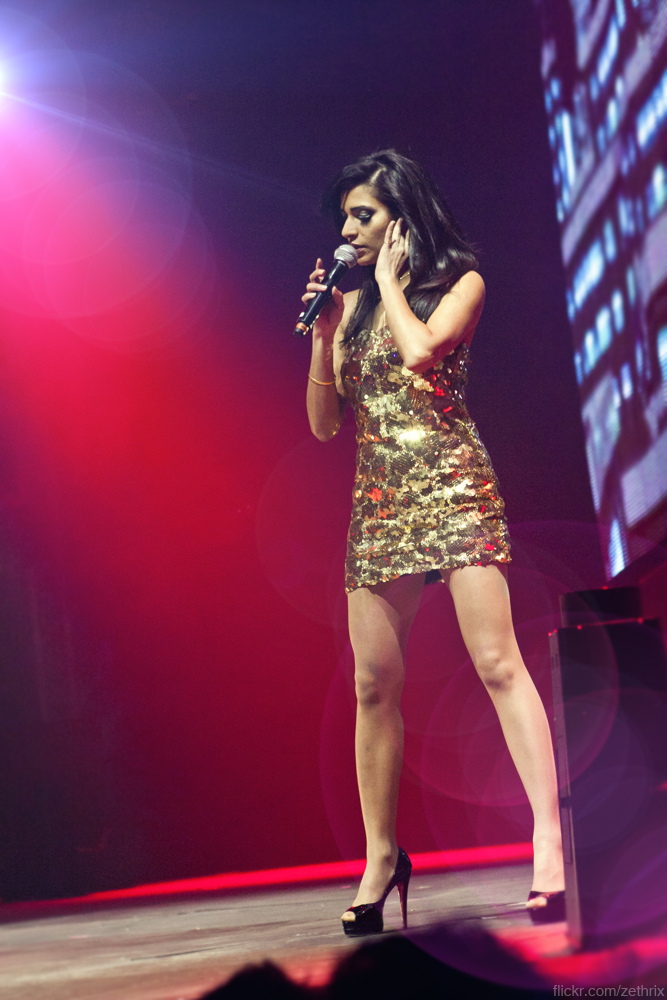
Nadia Ali has recorded the album Embers released in 2009

Nadia Ali is a Pakistani-American singer-songwriter. She rose to fame in 2001 as the frontwoman of the house act iiO with their single "Rapture". With iiO, she released the studio album Poetica. She left the group in 2005 to embark on a solo career, while the group continued to release album featuring her on vocals most notably the 2011 studio album Exit 110.

Her first release after leaving the group was a collaboration with Armin van Buuren titled "Who is Watching" released on his 2005 album Shivers. She released her solo album Embers in 2009. The first single for the album was "Crash and Burn", which she wrote herself. Ali wrote all the songs on the album herself except "Promises", which was written by Paul Bosko.

Ali has gone on to become an oft-requested vocalist in electronic dance music and has released songs with DJs such as Sander van Doorn, BT and Morgan Page. Songs included in this list are from her studio albums and collaborations with other recordings artists on their respective albums and non-album singles.

== Songs ==
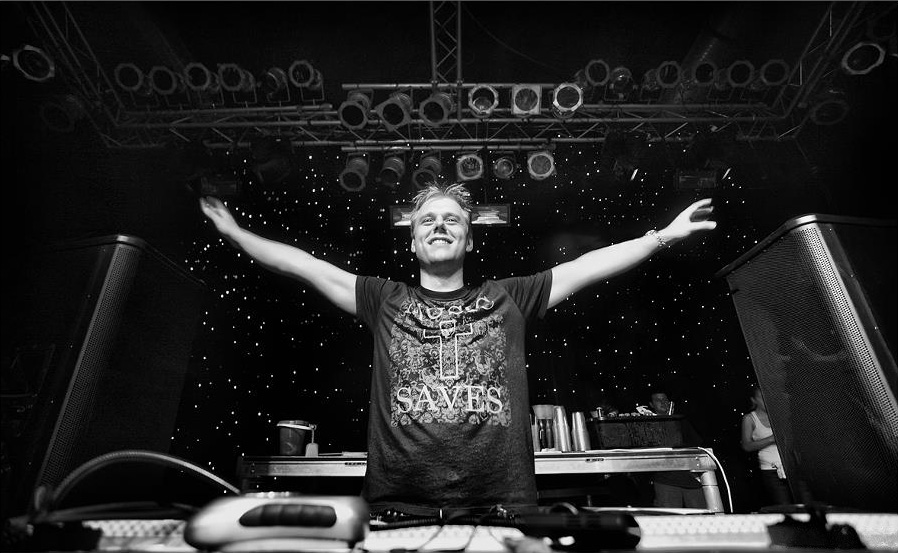
Nadia Ali has collaborated twice with Armin van Buuren on his albums Shivers and Mirage.

Paul Bosko wrote the song "Promises" for Ali's album Embers.

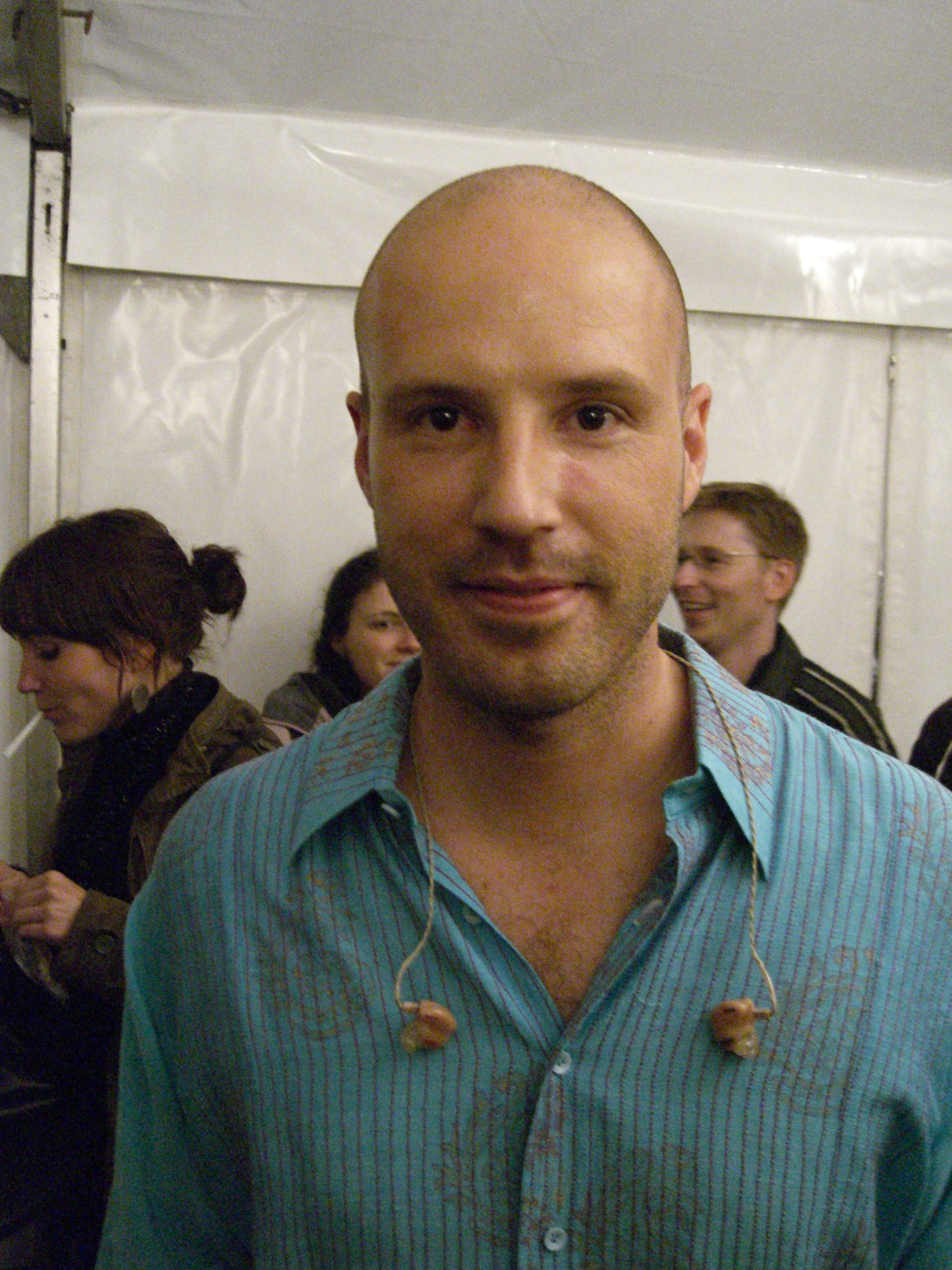
Schiller collaborated with Ali on the lead single "Try" from his album Atemlos

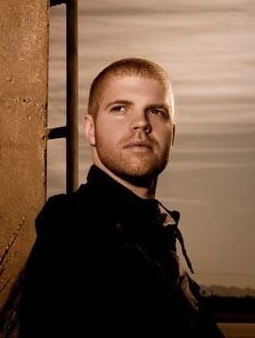
Ali was featured on Morgan Page's 2012 album In The Air

Key
†	Indicates single release
‡	Indicates song not written by Nadia Ali

Song	Artist(s)	Writer(s)	Originating album	Year	Ref.
"12 Wives in Tehran" †	Serge Devant featuring Nadia Ali	Nadia Ali	Wanderer	2009	
"All In My Head" †	Nadia Ali & PANG!	Nadia Ali	Non-album Single	2015	
"All Over The Place" †	HYLLS	Nadia Ali	Non-album Single	2018	
"Almost Home" †	Sultan + Shepard feat. Nadia Ali and IRO	Nadia Ali; Ori Rakib	Non-album Single	2017	
"Be Mine"	Nadia Ali	Nadia Ali	Embers	2009	
"Believe It" †	Spencer & Hill & Nadia Ali	Nadia Ali	Non-album Single	2011	
"Better Run" †	Tocadisco & Nadia Ali	Nadia Ali	Toca 128.0 FM	2009	
"Call My Name"†	Sultan & Ned Shepard featuring Nadia Ali	Nadia Ali	Non-album Single	2011	
"Carry Me" †	Morgan Page & Nadia Ali	Nadia Ali	In The Air	2012	
"Crash and Burn" †	Nadia Ali	Nadia Ali	Embers	2008	
"Fantasy" †	Nadia Ali	Nadia Ali	Embers	2009	
"Feels So Good" †	Armin van Buuren featuring Nadia Ali	Miriam Nervo; Olivia Nervo ‡	Mirage	2010	
"Fine Print" †	Nadia Ali	Nadia Ali	Embers	2009	
"Free To Go" †	Alex Sayz featuring Nadia Ali	Nadia Ali	Pulse: 128—130	2011	
"Keep It Coming" †	Starkillers & Nadia Ali	Nadia Ali	Non-album single	2011	
"Linger" †	HYLLS	Dolores O'Riordan; Noel Hogan ‡	Non-album single	2019	
"Love Story" †	Nadia Ali	Nadia Ali	Embers	2009	
"Mistakes"	Nadia Ali	Nadia Ali	Embers	2009	
"Must Be The Love" †	Arty, Nadia Ali & BT	Nadia Ali	A Song Across Wires	2012	
"Not Thinking"	Nadia Ali	Nadia Ali	Embers	2009	
"The Notice" †	Chris Reece & Nadia Ali	Nadia Ali	The Divine Circle	2010	
"People"	Nadia Ali	Nadia Ali	Embers	2009	
"Point The Finger"	Nadia Ali	Nadia Ali	Embers	2009	
"Pressure" †	Nadia Ali, Starkillers & Alex Kenji	Nadia Ali	Non-album single	2011	
"Promises"	Nadia Ali	Paul Bosko ‡	Embers	2009	
"Rapture" †	Nadia Ali	Nadia Ali; Markus Moser	Queen of Clubs Trilogy: Onyx Edition	2010	
"Ride With Me"	Nadia Ali	Nadia Ali	Embers	2009	
"Rolling The Dice"	Sander van Doorn, Sidney Samson & Nadia Ali	Nadia Ali	Eleve11	2011	
"Roxanne" (Note: "Roxanne", originally performed by The Police in 1978, was re-recorded by Ali and released as a free download.)	Nadia Ali	Sting ‡	—N/a	2014	
"Silver Lining"	Nadia Ali	Nadia Ali	Embers	2009	
"Something To Lose" †	Creamer & K featuring Nadia Ali & Rosko	Nadia Ali; Paul Bosko	Non-album single	2006	
"That Day"	Dresden & Johnston featuring Nadia Ali & Mikael Johnston	Nadia Ali; Mikael Johnston	Queen of Clubs Trilogy: Onyx Edition	2010	
"This is Your Life" †	EDX & Nadia Ali	Nadia Ali	On The Edge	2012	
"Triangle"	Nadia Ali	Nadia Ali	Embers	2009	
"Try" †	Schiller mit Nadia Ali	Nadia Ali	Atemlos	2010	
"When It Rains" †	Nadia Ali	Nadia Ali	Phoenix	2011	
"Who Is Watching" †	Armin van Buuren featuring Nadia Ali	Nadia Ali; Ashkan Fardost	Shivers	2005	

== See also ==
- Nadia Ali discography
