= Nadia Ali discography =

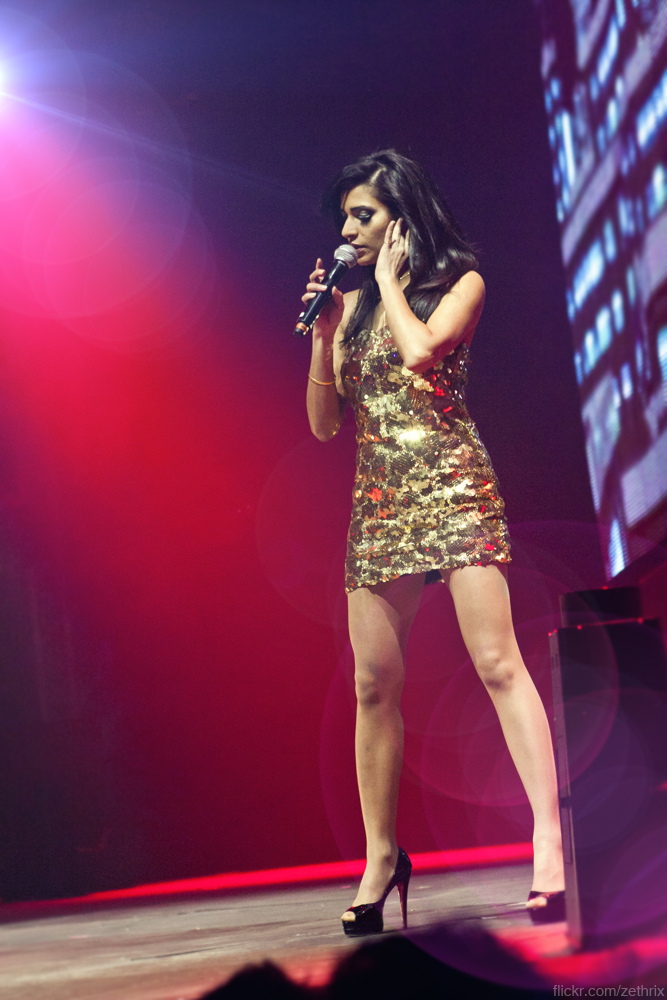
- Nadia Ali performing at Armin Only in 2011
- Studio albums: 2
- Singles: 36
- Music videos: 15
- Remix albums: 3
- Other appearances: 6

The discography of Nadia Ali, a Pakistani American singer-songwriter, consists of two studio albums, three remix albums, thirty-six singles (including fifteen as a featured artist) and fourteen music videos. Ali began her career in 2001 as the frontwoman of New York-based house music act iiO, whose debut single "Rapture" reached number two on the UK Singles Chart and Billboard Hot Dance Club Play Chart and charted in several other countries. While with iiO, she released the 2005 studio album Poetica, which reached number 17 on Billboard Dance/Electronic Albums chart. Apart from "Rapture", the album produced five other singles including the Billboard Hot Dance Club Play number one single "Is It Love?". Ali left iiO in 2005, while the band continued to release material featuring her on vocals, most notably the 2011 studio album Exit 110.

Ali began her solo career in 2006 with a collaboration with Dutch DJ Armin van Buuren, appearing on his single "Who is Watching?", which reached number 19 in Finland. She released her debut solo album Embers in 2009, which was praised for her songwriting and the blend of electronic, acoustic and Eastern music. The album spawned four singles, which included the Billboard Hot Dance Club Play chart-topper "Love Story", the top-ten "Fine Print" and "Crash and Burn" and the Grammy-nominated "Fantasy". She was also featured on Tocadisco's single "Better Run", which peaked at number 15 in Belgium.

In 2010, Ali released a remix album series titled Queen of Clubs Trilogy consisting of three albums, Ruby Edition (August 2010), Onyx Edition (October 2010) and Diamond Edition (December 2010). The trilogy produced one single: the re-released "Rapture", which charted in several countries in Europe and reached number three in Romania. Ali's first release in 2011 was the single "Call My Name" with Sultan and Ned Shepard; the track was a club success peaking at number five on Billboard Hot Dance Club Play Chart. Her second release was the track "Pressure", which became a club and festival anthem in summer 2011, while also charting in Belgium and Netherlands. As of 2018, she has been working under the project HYLLS, releasing a new song every month culminating with the studio album Once in 2019.

== Albums ==
=== Studio albums ===
List of albums
Title	Album details	Ref(s)
Embers	Released: September 15, 2009; Label: Smile in Bed; Formats: digital	
Once (as HYLLS)	Released: March 7, 2019; Label: Self-released; Formats: digital	

=== Remix albums ===
List of albums
Title	Album details	Ref(s)
Queen of Clubs Trilogy: Ruby Edition	Released: August 31, 2010; Label: Smile in Bed; Formats: digital download	
Queen of Clubs Trilogy: Onyx Edition	Released: October 28, 2010; Label: Smile in Bed; Formats: digital download	
Queen of Clubs Trilogy: Diamond Edition	Released: December 21, 2010; Label: Smile in Bed; Formats: digital download	

== Singles ==
=== As Nadia Ali ===
List of singles, with selected chart positions
Title	Year	Peak chart positions								Album	Ref(s)
Title	Year	US Dance	BEL (Fla)	BEL (Wal)	FRA	NLD	ROU	SWI	UK	Album	Ref(s)
"Crash and Burn"	2008	6	—	—	—	—	—	—	—	Embers	
"Love Story"	2009	1	—	—	—	—	—	—	—	Embers	
"Fine Print"	2010	4	—	—	—	—	—	—	—	Embers	
"Fantasy"	2010	—	—	—	—	—	—	—	—	Embers	
"Rapture"	2010	—	28	17	24	77	3	63	40	Queen of Clubs Trilogy	
"Pressure" (with Starkillers & Alex Kenji)	2011	4	37	16	—	97	—	—	—	Non-album singles	
"When It Rains"	2011	—	—	—	—	—	—	—	—	Non-album singles	
"All in My Head" (with PANG!)	2015	—	—	—	—	—	—	—	—	Non-album singles	
"3, 2, 1" (with Michael Calfan)	2022	—	—	—	—	—	—	—	—	Non-album singles	
"—" denotes releases that did not chart or were not released in that country.

=== As Hylls ===
List of singles
Title	Year	Album	Ref(s)
"All Over the Place"	2018	Once	
"Linger"	2018	Once	
"Chance	2018	Once	
"Wait for Me"	2018	Once	
"Timeless"	2018	Once	
"Petals"	2018	Once	
"Feathers"	2018	Once	
"Miracle"	2018	Once	
"Selfish Heart"	2018	Once	
"Maze"	2018	Once	
"Easy"	2018	Once	
"Why"	2018	Once	

=== As featured artist ===
List of singles, with selected chart positions
Title	Year	Peak chart positions				Album	Ref(s)
Title	Year	US Dance	BEL (Fla)	FIN	GER	Album	Ref(s)
"Who Is Watching" (Armin van Buuren featuring Nadia Ali)	2006	—	—	19	—	Shivers	
"Something to Lose" (Creamer & K featuring Nadia Ali & Rosko)	2006	—	—	—	—	Non-album single	
"12 Wives in Tehran" (Serge Devant featuring Nadia Ali)	2009	—	—	—	—	Wanderer	
"Better Run" (Tocadisco & Nadia Ali)	2009	—	15	—	—	TOCA 128.0 FM	
"Try" (Schiller with Nadia Ali)	2010	—	—	—	58	Atemlos	
"The Notice" (Chris Reece & Nadia Ali)	2010	—	—	—	—	The Divine Circle	
"Call My Name" (Sultan & Ned Shepard featuring Nadia Ali)	2011	5	—	—	—	Non-album single	
"Free to Go" (Alex Sayz featuring Nadia Ali)	2011	—	—	—	—	Pulse: 128—130	
"Feels So Good" (Armin van Buuren featuring Nadia Ali)	2011	—	—	—	—	Mirage	
"Believe It" (Spencer & Hill & Nadia Ali)	2011	21	72	—	—	Non-album single	
"Keep It Coming" (Starkillers & Nadia Ali)	2011	—	—	—	—	Non-album single	
"This Is Your Life" (EDX & Nadia Ali)	2012	—	—	—	—	On the Edge	
"Must Be the Love" (Arty, Nadia Ali & BT)	2012	—	—	—	—	A Song Across Wires	
"Carry Me" (Morgan Page & Nadia Ali)	2013	—	—	—	—	In the Air	
"Almost Home" (Sultan + Shepard feat. Nadia Ali & IRO)	2017	20	—	—	—	Echoes of Life: Day	
"—" denotes releases that did not chart or were not released in that country.

== Music videos ==
List of music videos, showing year released and director
Title	Year	Director(s)
"Love Story"	2009	Phil Di Fiore
"Try"	2010	Marcus Sternberg
"Fantasy" (Morgan Page Remix)	2010	Ryan Littman and Berman Fenelus
"Fantasy" (Album Edit)	2010	Ryan Littman and Berman Fenelus
"The Notice"	2010	Jelle Posthuma
"Rapture" (Avicii Remix)	2011	Brando Neverland
"Call My Name"	2011	Nicholas Cambata
"Feels So Good"	2011	Jelle Posthuma
"Pressure" (Alesso Radio Mix)	2011	Brando Neverland
"When It Rains"	2011	Brando Neverland
"Believe It" (Cazzette Remix)	2012	Svenno Koemans
"This Is Your Life"	2012	Anthony Chirco and Travis John Hoffman
"That Day"	2012	Brando Bowthorpe
"Must Be the Love"	2013	Svenno Koemans
"Almost Home"	2017	Chuck David Willis

== Other appearances ==
The following songs are not (official or promotional) singles and have not appeared on an album by Ali:

Song	Year	Album	Ref(s)
"That Day" (Myon & Shane 54 Remix) (Dresden & Johnston featuring Nadia Ali & Mikael Johnston)	2010	International Departures	
"That Day" (Lenny Ruckus & Ana Vida Remix) (Dresden & Johnston featuring Nadia Ali & Mikael Johnston)	2010	Intuition Sessions 2: Rio de Janeiro	
"That Day" (Sydney Blu Remix) (Dresden & Johnston featuring Nadia Ali & Mikael Johnston)	2011	Nervous Nightlife: Live at Mansion	
"Rolling the Dice" (Sander van Doorn & Sidney Samson featuring Nadia Ali)	2011	Eleve11	
"Roxanne"	2014	Non-album release	^{[A]}

=== Writing credits ===
These songs were written by Ali and performed by other artists only and have not appeared on a studio album by Ali:

Song	Year	Album/Single	Notes	Ref(s)
"Sometimes I Wish"	2011	Piercing the Quiet	Performed by Tritonal featuring Bethany	^{[B]}

Notes

- A. "Roxanne", originally performed by The Police in 1978, was re-recorded by Ali and released as a free download.
- B. Co-written with Bethany Cosentino
