= Queen of Clubs Trilogy: Diamond Edition =

Remix album by Nadia Ali
- Released: December 20, 2010
- Recorded: 2001, 2009–2010
- Genre: Electronic dance music
- Length: 52:47
- Label: Smile in Bed Records
- Producer: Nadia Ali

Nadia Ali chronology
Queen of Clubs Trilogy: Onyx Edition (2010)	Queen of Clubs Trilogy: Diamond Edition (2010)	Phoenix (2014)

Singles from Queen of Clubs Trilogy: Diamond Edition
- 1. "Rapture (Gareth Emery Remix)" Released: December 20, 2010

Queens of Clubs Trilogy: Diamond Edition is a remix album by Libyan-born American singer-songwriter Nadia Ali. The Diamond Edition is the final installment in Ali's three-part compilation, Queen of Clubs Trilogy: The Best of Nadia Ali Remixed. The album was released on December 20, 2010 by Smile in Bed Records.

== Track listing ==
Queen of Clubs Trilogy: Diamond Edition
No.	Title	Writer(s)	Producer(s)	Length
1.	"Rapture (Gareth Emery Remix)"	Nadia Ali	Nadia Ali & Markus Moser / Gareth Emery	3:37
2.	"Call My Name (Max Graham and Protoculture Remix)"	Nadia Ali	Ned Shepard & Ossama Al Sarraf/ Max Graham & Nate "Click" Raubenheimer	3:47
3.	"Ride With Me (DJ Shogun Remix)"	Nadia Ali	Nadia Ali, Alex Sayz & Nick Wahlberg / Andrew Chen	3:30
4.	"Triangle (Michael Badal Remix)"	Nadia Ali	Nadia Ali, Ossama Al Sarraf & Ned Shepard / Michael Badal	4:12
5.	"Point The Finger (Lost Stories Remix)"	Nadia Ali	Nadia Ali, Alex Sayz & Nick Wahlberg / Prayag Mehta & Rishab Joshi	3:44
6.	"Promises (Walsh & McAuley Remix)"	Paul Bosko	Nadia Ali & Scott ‘Fritzy’ Fritz / Marc Walsh & Ciarán McAuley	3:40
7.	"Mistakes (Rassek Remix)"	Nadia Ali	Nadia Ali & Scott ‘Fritzy’ Fritz / Arash Rassekh Afshar	4:13
8.	"At The End (Hardwell Remix)"	Nadia Ali	Nadia Ali & Markus Moser/ Robbert van de Corput	3:14
9.	"Who is Watching (Tone Depth Remix)"	Ashkan Fardost & Nadia Ali	Armin van Buuren / Tony Papadopoulos	3:52
10.	"People (Eelke Kleijn People of the Sun Remix)"	Nadia Ali	Nadia Ali, Ossama Al Sarraf & Ned Shepard / Eelke Kleijn	3:39
11.	"Crash and Burn (Kered & Kiraly Remix)"	Nadia Ali	Nadia Ali & Scott ‘Fritzy’ Fritz / Kered & Mike Kiraly	4:08
12.	"Love Story (Andy Moor Remix)"	Nadia Ali	Nadia Ali, Ossama Al Sarraf & Ned Shepard / Andy Moor	3:34
13.	"Fine Print (Alex Sayz Remix)"	Nadia Ali	Nadia Ali, Alex Sayz & Nick Wahlberg	3:56
14.	"Fantasy (Starkillers Remix)"	Nadia Ali	Nadia Ali, Ossama Al Sarraf & Ned Shepard / Nick Terranova	3:41

Queen of Clubs Trilogy: Diamond Edition (Extended Remixes)
No.	Title	Writer(s)	Producer(s)	Length
1.	"Rapture (Gareth Emery Extended Mix)"	Nadia Ali	Nadia Ali & Markus Moser / Gareth Emery	7:16
2.	"Call My Name (Max Graham and Protoculture Extended Mix)"	Nadia Ali	Ned Shepard & Ossama Al Sarraf/ Max Graham & Nate "Click" Raubenheimer	7:21
3.	"Ride With Me (DJ Shogun Extended Mix)"	Nadia Ali	Nadia Ali, Alex Sayz & Nick Wahlberg / Andrew Chen	7:40
4.	"Triangle (Michael Badal Extended Mix)"	Nadia Ali	Nadia Ali, Ossama Al Sarraf & Ned Shepard / Michael Badal	8:26
5.	"Point The Finger (Lost Stories Extended Mix)"	Nadia Ali	Nadia Ali, Alex Sayz & Nick Wahlberg / Prayag Mehta & Rishab Joshi	7:30
6.	"Promises (Walsh & McAuley Extended Mix)"	Paul Bosko	Nadia Ali & Scott ‘Fritzy’ Fritz / Marc Walsh & Ciarán McAuley	8:22
7.	"Mistakes (Rassek Extended Mix)"	Nadia Ali	Nadia Ali & Scott ‘Fritzy’ Fritz / Arash Rassekh Afshar	7:42
8.	"At The End (Hardwell Extended Mix)"	Nadia Ali	Nadia Ali & Markus Moser/ Robbert van de Corput	5:01
9.	"Who is Watching (Tone Depth Extended Mix)"	Ashkan Fardost & Nadia Ali	Armin van Buuren / Tony Papadopoulos	11:19
10.	"People (Eelke Kleijn People of the Sun Extended Mix)"	Nadia Ali	Nadia Ali, Ossama Al Sarraf & Ned Shepard / Eelke Kleijn	7:08
11.	"Crash and Burn (Kered & Kiraly Extended Mix)"	Nadia Ali	Nadia Ali & Scott ‘Fritzy’ Fritz / Kered & Mike Kiraly	8:01
12.	"Love Story (Andy Moor Extended Mix)"	Nadia Ali	Nadia Ali, Ossama Al Sarraf & Ned Shepard / Andy Moor	8:54
13.	"Fine Print (Alex Sayz Extended Mix)"	Nadia Ali	Nadia Ali, Alex Sayz & Nick Wahlberg	7:34
14.	"Fantasy (Starkillers Extended Mix)"	Nadia Ali	Nadia Ali, Ossama Al Sarraf & Ned Shepard / Nick Terranova	7:03

== Credits ==
- Track 2: Collaboration with Sultan & Ned Shepard
- Track 9: Collaboration with Armin van Buuren
