= Queen of Clubs Trilogy: Onyx Edition =

Remix album by Nadia Ali
- Released: October 28, 2010
- Recorded: 2001, 2008–2010
- Genre: Electronic dance music
- Length: 68:25
- Label: Smile in Bed Records
- Producer: Nadia Ali

Nadia Ali chronology
Queen of Clubs Trilogy: Ruby Edition (2010)	Queen of Clubs Trilogy: Onyx Edition (2010)	Queen of Clubs Trilogy: Diamond Edition (2010)

Singles from Queen of Clubs Trilogy: Onyx Edition
- 1. "Rapture (Avicii New Generation Mix)" Released: December 3, 2010

Queens of Clubs Trilogy: Onyx Edition is the second installment in the Queen of Clubs Trilogy: The Best of Nadia Ali Remixed, a compilation of remixes of tracks by Libyan-born American singer-songwriter Nadia Ali. The album was released on October 28, 2010 by Smile in Bed Records.

== Track listing ==
Queen of Clubs Trilogy: Onyx Edition
No.	Title	Writer(s)	Producer(s)	Length
1.	"Rapture (Avicii New Generation Mix)"	Nadia Ali	Nadia Ali & Markus Moser / Tim Bergling	3:41
2.	"Crash and Burn (DJ Shah Magic Island Mix)"	Nadia Ali	Nadia Ali & Scott ‘Fritzy’ Fritz / Roger Shah	4:03
3.	"Love Story (The Scumfrog Mix)"	Nadia Ali	Nadia Ali, Ossama Al Sarraf & Ned Shepard / Jesse Houk	3:46
4.	"Is It Love (Ron Reeser & Dan Saenz Mix)"	Nadia Ali	Nadia Ali & Markus Moser / Ron Reeser & Dan Saenz	3:44
5.	"Ride With Me (Alex Kenji Love Mix)"	Nadia Ali	Nadia Ali, Alex Sayz & Nick Wahlberg / Alessandro Bacci	3:42
6.	"Fine Print (TyDi Mix)"	Nadia Ali	Nadia Ali, Alex Sayz & Nick Wahlberg / Tyson Illingworth	4:10
7.	"The Notice (Sunn Jellie Mix)"	Nadia Ali	Christian Hirt & Roberto Pagliaro / Artem Kleptsov	3:36
8.	"Fantasy (EDX Mix)"	Nadia Ali	Nadia Ali, Ossama Al Sarraf & Ned Shepard / Maurizio Colella	3:24
9.	"Triangle (Myon & Shane 54 Classic Mix)"	Nadia Ali	Nadia Ali, Ossama Al Sarraf & Ned Shepard / Márió Égető & Előd Császár	3:47
10.	"Give It Up (Niklas Gustavsson Mix)"	Nadia Ali	Nadia Ali & Markus Moser / Niklas Gustavsson	3:29
11.	"Point The Finger (Kevin Alves Mix)"	Nadia Ali	Nadia Ali, Alex Sayz & Nick Wahlberg / Kevin Alves	3:54
12.	"Not Thinking (KhomHa Sunrise Mix)"	Nadia Ali	Nadia Ali & Scott ‘Fritzy’ Fritz / Robert Alzate	3:54
13.	"Promises (Sebastian Krieg & Roman F Mix)"	Paul Bosko	Nadia Ali & Scott ‘Fritzy’ Fritz / Sebastian Krieg & Roman Freihoff	3:58
14.	"Better Run (Afrojack Mix)"	Nadia Ali	Roman Böer / Nick van de Wall	3:47
15.	"The One (Niki McNally’s Seismic Dream Mix)"	Nadia Ali	Nadia Ali & Markus Moser / Niki McNally	4:15
16.	"That Day (Tritonal Air Up There Mix) Duet with Mikael Johnston"	Nadia Ali, Mikael Johnston & Dave Dresden	Dave Dresden & Mikael Johnston / Chad Cisneros & Dave Reed	3:53
17.	"Something To Lose (Cedric Gervais Mix) Duet with Rosko"	Nadia Ali & Paul Bosko	John Creamer & Stephane K / Cedric Gervais	3:44
18.	"12 Wives in Tehran (David Tort Mix)"		Serge Devant / David Tort	3:35

Queen of Clubs Trilogy: Onyx Edition (Extended Remixes)
No.	Title	Writer(s)	Producer(s)	Length
1.	"Rapture (Avicii New Generation Extended Mix)"	Nadia Ali	Nadia Ali & Markus Moser / Tim Bergling	7:08
2.	"Crash and Burn (DJ Shah Magic Island Extended Mix)"	Nadia Ali	Nadia Ali & Scott ‘Fritzy’ Fritz / Roger Shah	8:05
3.	"Love Story (The Scumfrog Extended Mix)"	Nadia Ali	Nadia Ali, Ossama Al Sarraf & Ned Shepard / Jesse Houk	9:03
4.	"Is It Love (Ron Reeser & Dan Saenz Extended Mix)"	Nadia Ali	Nadia Ali & Markus Moser / Ron Reeser & Dan Saenz	7:45
5.	"Ride With Me (Alex Kenji Love Extended Mix)"	Nadia Ali	Nadia Ali, Alex Sayz & Nick Wahlberg / Alessandro Bacci	6:11
6.	"Fine Print (TyDi Extended Mix)"	Nadia Ali	Nadia Ali, Alex Sayz & Nick Wahlberg / Tyson Illingworth	8:42
7.	"The Notice (Sunn Jellie Extended Mix)"	Nadia Ali	Christian Hirt & Roberto Pagliaro / Artem Kleptsov	8:23
8.	"Fantasy (EDX Extended Mix)"	Nadia Ali	Nadia Ali, Ossama Al Sarraf & Ned Shepard / Maurizio Colella	8:18
9.	"Triangle (Myon & Shane 54 Classic Extended Mix)"	Nadia Ali	Nadia Ali, Ossama Al Sarraf & Ned Shepard / Márió Égető & Előd Császár	7:40
10.	"Give It Up (Niklas Gustavsson Extended Mix)"	Nadia Ali	Nadia Ali & Markus Moser / Niklas Gustavsson	8:05
11.	"Point The Finger (Kevin Alves Extended Mix)"	Nadia Ali	Nadia Ali, Alex Sayz & Nick Wahlberg / Kevin Alves	7:05
12.	"Not Thinking (KhomHa Sunrise Extended Mix)"	Nadia Ali	Nadia Ali & Scott ‘Fritzy’ Fritz / Robert Alzate	7:05
13.	"Promises (Sebastian Krieg & Roman F Extended Mix)"	Paul Bosko	Nadia Ali & Scott ‘Fritzy’ Fritz / Sebastian Krieg & Roman Freihoff	8:01
14.	"Better Run (Afrojack Extended Mix)"	Nadia Ali	Roman Böer / Nick van de Wall	4:37
15.	"The One (Niki McNally’s Seismic Dream Extended Mix)"	Nadia Ali	Nadia Ali & Markus Moser / Niki McNally	7:59
16.	"That Day (Tritonal Air Up There Extended Mix)"	Nadia Ali, Mikael Johnston & Dave Dresden	Dave Dresden & Mikael Johnston / Chad Cisneros & Dave Reed	7:14
17.	"Something To Lose (Cedric Gervais Extended Mix)"	Nadia Ali & Paul Bosko	John Creamer & Stephane K / Cedric Gervais	7:04
18.	"12 Wives in Tehran (David Tort Extended Mix)"		Serge Devant / David Tort	8:00

== Credits ==
- Track 7: Collaboration with Chris Reece
- Track 16: Collaboration with Dresden & Johnston
- Track 17: Collaboration with Creamer & K and Rosko
- Track 18: Collaboration with Serge Devant
