= Queen of Clubs Trilogy: Ruby Edition =

Remix album by Nadia Ali
- Released: August 31, 2010
- Recorded: 2001, 2005–2010
- Genre: Electronic dance music
- Length: 48:35
- Label: Smile in Bed Records
- Producer: Nadia Ali

Nadia Ali chronology
Embers (2009)	Queen of Clubs Trilogy: Ruby Edition (2010)	Queen of Clubs Trilogy: Onyx Edition (2010)

'Queens of Clubs Trilogy: The Best of Nadia Ali Remixed' is a three-part compilation of remixed tracks by Libyan-born American singer-songwriter Nadia Ali. The albums feature songs from her time as one-half of iiO and her subsequent solo career. The compilation celebrates Ali's decade-long career as a musician. The title of the trilogy was inspired by Ali's 'un-rivalled contributions to dance music and club culture'. The first installment, Ruby Edition, was released on August 31, 2010 by Smile in Bed Records.

== Track listing ==
Queen of Clubs Trilogy: Ruby Edition
No.	Title	Writer(s)	Producer(s)	Length
1.	"People (Justin Michael & Kemal Radio Edit)"	Nadia Ali	Nadia Ali, Ossama Al Sarraf & Ned Shepard / Justin Michael and Kemal Okan	3:27
2.	"Not Thinking (Green & Falkner Radio Edit)"	Nadia Ali	Nadia Ali & Scott ‘Fritzy’ Fritz / Josh Green & Steve Falkner	4:24
3.	"Better Run (Wippenberg Radio Edit)"	Nadia Ali	Roman Böer / Olaf Dieckmann	4:15
4.	"Try (Thomas Gold Radio Edit)"	Nadia Ali and Christopher Von Deylen	Christopher Von Deylen / Thomas Gold	3:38
5.	"Fine Print (Serge Devant Radio Edit)"	Nadia Ali	Nadia Ali, Alex Sayz & Nick Wahlberg / Serge Devant	3:40
6.	"Silver Lining (Andretta Radio Edit)"	Nadia Ali	Nadia Ali & Scott ‘Fritzy’ Fritz / Sammy Andretta and Sherif Andretta	3:58
7.	"Be Mine (Noel Sanger Radio Edit)"	Nadia Ali	Nadia Ali & Scott ‘Fritzy’ Fritz / Noel Sanger	4:15
8.	"Fantasy (Morgan Page Radio Edit)"	Nadia Ali	Nadia Ali, Ossama Al Sarraf & Ned Shepard / Morgan Page	4:09
9.	"Love Story (Sultan and Ned Shepard Radio Edit)"	Nadia Ali	Nadia Ali, Ossama Al Sarraf & Ned Shepard	3:26
10.	"Crash and Burn (Dean Coleman Radio Edit)"	Nadia Ali	Nadia Ali & Scott ‘Fritzy’ Fritz / Dean Coleman	3:07
11.	"The One (Ruby Edit)"	Nadia Ali	Nadia Ali & Markus Moser / Scott ‘Fritzy’ Fritz	3:23
12.	"Rebel (Ruby Edit)"	Nadia Ali	Nadia Ali & Markus Moser / Scott ‘Fritzy’ Fritz	3:00
13.	"Kiss You (Ruby Edit)"	Nadia Ali	Nadia Ali & Markus Moser / Lance Jordan	3:53

Queen of Clubs Trilogy: Ruby Edition (Extended Remixes)
No.	Title	Writer(s)	Producer(s)	Length
1.	"People (Justin Michael & Kemal Remix)"	Nadia Ali	Nadia Ali, Ossama Al Sarraf & Ned Shepard / Justin Michael and Kemal Okan	6:40
2.	"Not Thinking (Green & Falkner Remix)"	Nadia Ali	Nadia Ali & Scott ‘Fritzy’ Fritz / Josh Green & Steve Falkner	7:06
3.	"Better Run (Wippenberg Remix)"	Nadia Ali	Roman Böer / Olaf Dieckmann	7:07
4.	"Try (Thomas Gold Remix)"	Nadia Ali and Christopher Von Deylen	Christopher Von Deylen / Thomas Gold	7:35
5.	"Fine Print (Serge Devant Remix)"	Nadia Ali	Nadia Ali, Alex Sayz & Nick Wahlberg / Serge Devant	7:46
6.	"Silver Lining (Andretta Remix)"	Nadia Ali	NNadia Ali & Scott ‘Fritzy’ Fritz / Sammy Andretta and Sherif Andretta	8:15
7.	"Be Mine (Noel Sanger Remix)"	Nadia Ali	Nadia Ali & Scott ‘Fritzy’ Fritz / Noel Sanger	8:24
8.	"Fantasy (Morgan Page Remix)"	Nadia Ali	Nadia Ali, Ossama Al Sarraf & Ned Shepard / Morgan Page	8:39
9.	"Love Story (Sultan and Ned Shepard Remix)"	Nadia Ali	Nadia Ali, Ossama Al Sarraf & Ned Shepard	9:11
10.	"Crash and Burn (Dean Coleman Remix)"	Nadia Ali	Nadia Ali & Scott ‘Fritzy’ Fritz / Dean Coleman	9:30
11.	"The One (Ruby Edit)"	Nadia Ali	Nadia Ali & Markus Moser / Scott ‘Fritzy’ Fritz	3:23
12.	"Rebel (Ruby Edit)"	Nadia Ali	Nadia Ali & Markus Moser / Scott ‘Fritzy’ Fritz	3:00
13.	"Kiss You (Ruby Edit)"	Nadia Ali	Nadia Ali & Markus Moser / Lance Jordan	3:53

=== Credits ===
- Track 3: Collaboration with Tocadisco
- Track 4: Collaboration with Schiller
