= Love Is a Drug =

Single by Rosko
- Released: February 2005
- Genre: Dance; Electronic
- Label: NY Love Records
- Songwriter(s): Paul Bosko, Lance Jordan, John Creamer, Stephane K
- Producer(s): Creamer & K and Lance Jordan

"Love Is a Drug" is the first single released by American recording artist Rosko. It was produced by John Creamer & Stephane K and Lance Jordan. In April 2005, it went to number one on the American Dance/Club Play chart.

== Track listing ==
1. "Love Is a Drug" [Creamer & K Original Radio Edit]
2. "Love Is a Drug" [Creamer & K Dub Mix]
3. "Love Is a Drug" [Lance Jordan XL Club Mix]
4. "Love Is a Drug" [Lance Jordan Beat Is Dub Mix]
5. "Love Is a Drug" [Creamer & K Extended Club Mix]
6. "Love Is a Drug" [Alternative Radio Mix]

== See also ==
- List of number-one dance singles of 2005 (U.S.)
