= List of Billboard number-one dance singles of 2005 =

Billboard magazine compiled the top-performing dance singles in the United States during 2005 on the Hot Dance Club Play, the Hot Dance Singles Sales, and the Hot Dance Radio Airplay. Premiered in 1976, the Hot Dance Club Play chart ranked the most-played singles on dance club based on reports from a national sample of club DJs. The Hot Dance Singles Sales chart was launched in 1985 to compile the best-selling dance singles based on retail sales across the United States. The Hot Dance Radio Airplay was first published in 2003, ranking the songs based on airplay detections on dance radio.

== Charts history ==
Chart history
Issue date	Hot Dance Club Play		Hot Dance Singles Sales		Hot Dance Radio Airplay		Ref.
Issue date	Song	Artist(s)	Song	Artist(s)	Song	Artist(s)	Ref.
January 1	"What You Waiting For?"	Gwen Stefani	"Tempted To Touch" (Remixes)	Rupee	"Surrender"	Lasgo	
January 8	"Lose My Breath"	Destiny's Child	"Tempted To Touch" (Remixes)	Rupee	"Walk into the Sun"	Dirty Vegas	
January 15	"Without Love"	Sun	"Tempted To Touch" (Remixes)	Rupee	"Surrender"	Lasgo	
January 22	"The Wonder of It All"	Kristine W	"Tempted To Touch" (Remixes)	Rupee	"Lose My Breath"	Destiny's Child	
January 29	"Silence 2004"	Delerium featuring Sarah McLachlan	"Tempted To Touch" (Remixes)	Rupee	"Lose My Breath"	Destiny's Child	
February 5	"Killer 2005"	Seal	"Tempted To Touch" (Remixes)	Rupee	"Lose My Breath"	Destiny's Child	
February 12	"Killer 2005"	Seal	"Breathe"	Erasure	"How Would You Feel"	David Morales with Lea-Lorien	
February 19	"House of Jupiter"	Casey Stratton	"Breathe"	Erasure	"How Would You Feel"	David Morales with Lea-Lorien	
February 26	"Soldier"	Destiny's Child featuring T.I. and Lil Wayne	"We Will Become Silhouettes"	The Postal Service	"1, 2 Step"	Ciara featuring Missy Elliott	
March 5	"Popular"	Darren Hayes	"We Will Become Silhouettes"	The Postal Service	"All This Time"	Jonathan Peters presents Sylver Logan Sharp	
March 12	"Show It"	Friburn & Urik	"We Will Become Silhouettes"	The Postal Service	"All This Time"	Jonathan Peters presents Sylver Logan Sharp	
March 19	"Breathe"	Erasure	"We Will Become Silhouettes"	The Postal Service	"1, 2 Step"	Ciara featuring Missy Elliott	
March 26	"Avalon"	Juliet	"We Will Become Silhouettes"	The Postal Service	"All This Time"	Jonathan Peters presents Sylver Logan Sharp	
April 2	"How Can I Be Falling"	Jennifer Green	"We Will Become Silhouettes"	The Postal Service	"All This Time"	Jonathan Peters presents Sylver Logan Sharp	
April 9	"Love Is a Drug"	Rosko	"We Will Become Silhouettes"	The Postal Service	"1, 2 Step"	Ciara featuring Missy Elliott	
April 16	"Get Right"	Jennifer Lopez	"We Will Become Silhouettes"	The Postal Service	"Since U Been Gone"	Kelly Clarkson	
April 23	"Call Me"	Anna Vissi	"We Will Become Silhouettes"	The Postal Service	"Since U Been Gone"	Kelly Clarkson	
April 30	"Filthy/Gorgeous"	Scissor Sisters	"We Will Become Silhouettes"	The Postal Service	"Since U Been Gone"	Kelly Clarkson	
May 7	"Set It Free"	Jason Walker	"We Will Become Silhouettes"	The Postal Service	"Since U Been Gone"	Kelly Clarkson	
May 14	"Everything"	Kaskade	"It's Like That" (David Morales Remixes)	Mariah Carey	"Since U Been Gone"	Kelly Clarkson	
May 21	"It's Like That"	Mariah Carey	"We Will Become Silhouettes"	The Postal Service	"Since U Been Gone"	Kelly Clarkson	
May 28	"Here I Am"	David Morales with Tamra Keenan	"One Word"	Kelly Osbourne	"One Word"	Kelly Osbourne	
June 4	"Most Precious Love"	Blaze presents U.D.A.U.F.L. featuring Barbara Tucker	"One Word"	Kelly Osbourne	"One Word"	Kelly Osbourne	
June 11	"Lift It Up"	Inaya Day	"One Word"	Kelly Osbourne	"One Word"	Kelly Osbourne	
June 18	"One Word"	Kelly Osbourne	"One Word"	Kelly Osbourne	"One Word"	Kelly Osbourne	
June 25	"Lonely No More"	Rob Thomas	"One Word"	Kelly Osbourne	"One Word"	Kelly Osbourne	
July 2	"Don't Cha"	Pussycat Dolls featuring Busta Rhymes	"We Will Become Silhouettes"	The Postal Service	"One Word"	Kelly Osbourne	
July 9	"Don't Cha"	Pussycat Dolls featuring Busta Rhymes	"We Will Become Silhouettes"	The Postal Service	† "Listen to Your Heart"	DHT	
July 16	"Don't Cha"	Pussycat Dolls featuring Busta Rhymes	"We Will Become Silhouettes"	The Postal Service	† "Listen to Your Heart"	DHT	
July 23	"Summer Moon"	Africanism All Stars	"We Will Become Silhouettes"	The Postal Service	† "Listen to Your Heart"	DHT	
July 30	"Gotta Go Gotta Leave (Tired)"	Vivian Green	"We Will Become Silhouettes"	The Postal Service	† "Listen to Your Heart"	DHT	
August 6	"We Belong Together"	Mariah Carey	"The Hand That Feeds"	Nine Inch Nails	"Don't Cha"	Pussycat Dolls featuring Busta Rhymes	
August 13	"Accept Me"	Vernessa Mitchell	"Don't Cha" (R. Rosario/Kaskade/DJ Dan Mixes)	Pussycat Dolls featuring Busta Rhymes	"Don't Cha"	Pussycat Dolls featuring Busta Rhymes	
August 20	"Sunshine"	Georgie Porgie	"Don't Cha" (R. Rosario/Kaskade/DJ Dan Mixes)	Pussycat Dolls featuring Busta Rhymes	"We Belong Together"	Mariah Carey	
August 27	"Ride the Pain"	Juliet	"Don't Cha" (R. Rosario/Kaskade/DJ Dan Mixes)	Pussycat Dolls featuring Busta Rhymes	"We Belong Together"	Mariah Carey	
September 3	"Looking for a New Love"	Jody Watley	"Don't Cha" (R. Rosario/Kaskade/DJ Dan Mixes)	Pussycat Dolls featuring Busta Rhymes	"Don't Cha"	Pussycat Dolls featuring Busta Rhymes	
September 10	"Shout"	Sisaundra	"Don't Cha" (R. Rosario/Kaskade/DJ Dan Mixes)	Pussycat Dolls featuring Busta Rhymes	"Don't Cha"	Pussycat Dolls featuring Busta Rhymes	
September 17	"Back to Basics"	Shape: UK	"Don't Cha" (R. Rosario/Kaskade/DJ Dan Mixes)	Pussycat Dolls featuring Busta Rhymes	"Don't Cha"	Pussycat Dolls featuring Busta Rhymes	
September 24	"Mesmerized"	Faith Evans	"Don't Cha" (R. Rosario/Kaskade/DJ Dan Mixes)	Pussycat Dolls featuring Busta Rhymes	"Don't Cha"	Pussycat Dolls featuring Busta Rhymes	
October 1	"Say Hello"	Deep Dish	"Don't Cha" (R. Rosario/Kaskade/DJ Dan Mixes)	Pussycat Dolls featuring Busta Rhymes	"These Words"	Natasha Bedingfield	
October 8	"Pon de Replay"	Rihanna	"Don't Cha" (R. Rosario/Kaskade/DJ Dan Mixes)	Pussycat Dolls featuring Busta Rhymes	"Pon de Replay"	Rihanna	
October 15	"I Like It (But I Don't Need It)"	Vivian Green	"Don't Cha" (R. Rosario/Kaskade/DJ Dan Mixes)	Pussycat Dolls featuring Busta Rhymes	"And She Said..."	Lucas Prata	
October 22	"Feels Just Like It Should"	Jamiroquai	"Don't Cha" (R. Rosario/Kaskade/DJ Dan Mixes)	Pussycat Dolls featuring Busta Rhymes	"And She Said..."	Lucas Prata	
October 29	"Precious"	Depeche Mode	"Precious"	Depeche Mode	"And She Said..."	Lucas Prata	
November 5	"Precious"	Depeche Mode	"Precious"	Depeche Mode	"And She Said..."	Lucas Prata	
November 12	"Cool"	Gwen Stefani	"Precious"	Depeche Mode	"Hung Up"	Madonna	
November 19	"Hung Up"	Madonna	"Number 1"	Goldfrapp	"Hung Up"	Madonna	
November 26	"Hung Up"	Madonna	"Number 1"	Goldfrapp	"Hung Up"	Madonna	
December 3	"Hung Up"	Madonna	"Hung Up"	Madonna	"Hung Up"	Madonna	
December 10	"Hung Up"	Madonna	"Hung Up"	Madonna	"Hung Up"	Madonna	
December 17	"I've Got a Life (It's the Only Thing That's Mine)"	Eurythmics	"Hung Up"	Madonna	"Hung Up"	Madonna	
December 24	"I've Got a Life (It's the Only Thing That's Mine)"	Eurythmics	"Hung Up"	Madonna	"Hung Up"	Madonna	
December 31	"I've Got a Life (It's the Only Thing That's Mine)"	Eurythmics	"Hung Up"	Madonna	"Hung Up"	Madonna	

== See also ==
- 2005 in music
- List of Billboard Hot 100 number ones of 2005
