= Lance Jordan =

American DJ/producer/musician/songwriter

- Lance Jordan at Avalon in 2006

Background information
- Born: Lance Jordan
- Genres: Electronic, rock, house
- Occupations: DJ, Singer, songwriter, producer
- Years active: 1996–present
- Labels: Dusk Recordings, NY Love records
- Website: lancejordan.com

Lance Jordan is an American DJ/producer/musician/songwriter. He is best known for his original productions, remixes and collaborations with the likes of such artists as Rosko, Tom Geiger, Nadia Ali, Marta C., and John Creamer & Stephane K. In 2003 Jordan with Creamer & K created the indie house music label NY Love Records, which produced a string of dance hits, most notably Rosko's 2005 anthem "Love Is A Drug" which went to No. 1 on the U.S. Billboard Dance Chart, and "Last Night I Was Dreaming" which rose to No. 2 on European Dance Radio.

== History ==
Jordan grew up in New York City, and started his musical career as a rock musician, as the first guitarist in NYC band Commonhaus as well as fronting several bands on guitar and vocals, including Gorilla Theater, all of which played to a loyal following for years at legendary venues like CBGB in Greenwich Village. In the late nineties, he relocated to Germany, and began to DJ, and started producing his own original techno and house music tracks under the name Esoul, short for Electronic Soul. He also started his own music production company, Blue Nova Music, during this time. He returned to New York City in 2000 to open his own production studio as part of the acclaimed Chinatown recording studio, The Engine Room, also known as Engine Room Recordings. Several of his Esoul recordings rose to the top of the charts on the popular MP3.com website, attracting attention and clients to his recording studio.

Jordan met singer-songwriter Rosko in 2001 at a Music and Internet Expo sponsored by mp3.com at Madison Square Garden. By 2002, they were shopping an album they made together, and began searching for remixers, and caught the attention of Creamer & K, who had just been named 2002 Remixers of the Year by Remix Magazine. After launching the label NY Love Records with Creamer & K in 2004, Jordan has co-produced a number of tracks for the label which have received wide support from the Global Dance Community, including "Something To Lose," a duet between Nadia Ali of iio and Rosko, which was signed to Ultra Records. Jordan has also produced many New York-based singers, and produced dance remixes for other labels including Radikal Records, Arista, and Webster Hall Records.

In 2005, Jordan launched his own independent dance label, Dusk Recordings. The label's first release, Sylvia Tosun's "Sleepless," reached No. 8 on the US Billboard Dance Chart. The label continues to release singles, including "Milkbone" feat. Rosko on vocals, "See The Light" feat. Nandi, the recent tracks "Ain't No Sunshine" and "New York Rocks," as well as "Sun Is Rising" which was licensed by Dubfire, one half of the Grammy Award-winning duo Deep Dish for his 2007 Global Underground album, "GU031 "Taipei." Dusk, the time of day between light and dark, continues to be a persistent theme in the label's releases and events.
