= All in My Head =

All in My Head may refer to:

- "All in My Head" (Kosheen song), 2003
- "All in My Head", a song by Good Shoes, from the album Think Before You Speak
- All in My Head, an EP by Seaway
- "All in My Head", a song by the Backstreet Boys from NKOTBSB
- "All in My Head", a song by Nadia Ali
- "All In My Head", a song by Smile Empty Soul from the 2016 EP Shapeshifter
- "All in My Head", a song by Shawn Mullins from the 2008 album Honeydew
- "All in My Head", a song by Tori Kelly, from the 2012 EP Handmade Songs
- All in My Head (Flex), a 2016 song by Fifth Harmony
- "All in My Head", a song by the Linda Lindas from the 2024 album No Obligation
- "All in My Head", a song by Blink-182 from the 2024 album One More Time... Part-2
