= Pressure (Nadia Ali song) =

- British cover

Single by Nadia Ali, Starkillers and Alex Kenji
- Released: February 15, 2011
- Genre: Progressive house
- Label: Spinnin'; Simply Delicious
- Songwriter(s): Nadia Ali
- Producer(s): Starkillers; Alex Kenji

Nadia Ali singles chronology
"Rapture" (2010)	"Pressure" (2011)	"Feels So Good" (2011)

Starkillers singles chronology
"Choose a Name" (2011)	"Pressure" (2011)	"Bottle Pop" (2011)

Alex Kenji singles chronology
"Melocoton" (2011)	"Pressure" (2011)	"Get Funky" (2011)

Alternative cover
- Dutch cover

Music video
- "Pressure" (Alesso Radio Mix) on YouTube

"Pressure" is a song by Nadia Ali, Starkillers and Alex Kenji. It was released on February 15, 2011 by Spinnin' Records. The song reached No. 16 on the Ultratip Chart in Wallonia, Belgium.

== Background ==
"Pressure" is Nadia Ali's sixth single as a lead artist. It was written by Ali and produced by American DJ Nick Terranova and Italian DJ Alessandro Bacci. Ali and Terranova met in 2009 when Ali requested him to remix her single "Love Story". After that, the two decided to collaborate on original productions and had studio sessions on Christmas Eve 2009 and produced a number of songs, of which one was "Pressure". Ali described "Pressure" as 'a fun song venting about the frustrations and expectations which come with being successful'. The song was left untouched until March 2010, when at the Winter Music Conference Ali introduced Terranova to Bacci, who was subsequently asked to collaborate with the two and co-produce the track creating the final version.

== Music video ==
A music video for "Pressure", directed by Brando Neverland was uploaded on YouTube on July 7, 2011. The music video was set to the Alesso remix and features Ali facing different forms of pressure such as a wind tunnel with chains, climbing a very long ladder while being chased by Terranova and Bacci. At the beginning of the video, Nocturne in E-flat major by Frédéric Chopin can be heard, and the building structures shown are those of Utah Valley University's computer science building interior.

== Alesso remix ==
The Alesso remix of "Pressure" became a club and festival anthem during the summer of 2011 and was included in the sets of prominent DJs such as Armin van Buuren, Tiesto, Kaskade, Calvin Harris and Swedish House Mafia. The song was described by Kaskade as the "Tune of 2011". The remix was also nominated for the Best Progressive Track at the 27th International Dance Music Awards at the Winter Music Conference. The song was also remixed by Calvin West, Clocx, Rene Amesz, as well as Matan Caspi and Eddy Good.

=== Awards and nominations ===
Year	Awards	Category	Work	Outcome	Ref.
2012	International Dance Music Awards	Best Progressive Track	"Pressure" (Alesso remix)	Won	

== Track listing ==
- Digital Download # 1
1. "Pressure" (Original Mix) – 6:01
- Digital Download # 2
1. "Pressure" (Alesso Remix) – 6:06
2. "Pressure" (Clokx Extended Commercial Remix) – 5:32
3. "Pressure" (Matan Caspi & Eddy Good Remix) – 6:06
4. "Pressure" (Rene Amesz Remix) – 7:23
5. "Pressure" (Calvin West Extended Remix) – 8:07
- U.S iTunes Release
1. "Pressure" (Alesso Radio Edit) – 3:00
- Belgium Digital Download # 1
1. "Pressure" (Alesso Radio Mix) – 3:02
2. "Pressure" (Alesso Remix) – 6:06
3. "Pressure" (Clokx Radio Remix) – 3:16
4. "Pressure" (Clokx Extended Commercial Remix) – 5:31
5. "Pressure" (Calvin West Extended Remix) – 8:06
- Belgium Digital Download # 2
1. "Pressure" (Crackerjack Remix) – 6:00
2. "Pressure" (DJ Exodus & Leewise Remix) – 7:34
3. "Pressure" (Full New April Mix) – 6:00
4. "Pressure" (George F, Eran Hersh & Damon Remix) – 8:15
5. "Pressure" (Marcus Maison & Will Dragen Remix) – 6:08
6. "Pressure" (Matan Caspi & Eddy Good Remix) – 6:05
- Belgium Digital Download # 3
1. "Pressure" (Original Mix) – 6:00
2. "Pressure" (Nikolas & Albert Day Remix) – 5:12
3. "Pressure" (O.B. Remix) – 7:03
4. "Pressure" (Ron Reese & Dan Saenz Remix) – 6:33
5. "Pressure" (YOS Mo' Preshaa Remix) – 8:16
6. "Pressure" (Rene Amesz Remix) – 7:22
- UK Digital Download
1. "Pressure" (Alesso Radio Edit)
2. "Pressure" (Tim Mason Remix)
3. "Pressure" (Zomboy Remix)
4. "Pressure" (Alesso Remix)
5. "Pressure" (Roul Doors vs East & Young Remix)
6. "Pressure" (Clokx Radio Remix)
7. "Pressure"

== Personnel ==
- Songwriting – Nadia Ali
- Composition and production – Starkillers, Alex Kenji
- Vocals – Nadia Ali

== Charts ==
=== Weekly charts ===
Chart (2011–12)	Peak position
Belgium (Ultratip Bubbling Under Flanders)	37
Belgium (Ultratip Bubbling Under Wallonia)	16
Netherlands (Single Top 100)	97
Russia Airplay (TopHit)	92
Slovakia (Rádio Top 100)	46
Ukraine Airplay (TopHit); Alesso Radio Mix	24
US Dance/Mix Show Airplay (Billboard)	4

=== Year-end charts ===
Chart (2011)	Position
US Dance/Mix Show Airplay (Billboard)	46
Chart (2012)	Position
Ukraine Airplay (TopHit)	167
US Dance/Mix Show Airplay (Billboard)	49

== Release history ==
Region	Date	Format
Worldwide	February 15, 2011	Digital download
Netherlands	February 28, 2011	Digital download
Italy	July 6, 2011	CD single
United States	July 13, 2011	Digital download
Belgium	August 3, 2011	Digital download
Ireland	November 18, 2011	Digital download
United Kingdom	November 21, 2011	Digital download
