= Rapture (iiO song) =

2001 single by iiO

Single by iiO

from the album Poetica
- Released: October 29, 2001
- Genre: Dance-pop
- Length: 3:12
- Label: Universal
- Songwriters: Nadia Ali; Markus Moser
- Producer: Markus Moser

IiO singles chronology
"Rapture" (2001)	"At the End" (2002)

Audio sample
- Iio - "Rapture": file; help

Music video
- "Rapture" on YouTube

"Rapture" (sometimes referenced as "Rapture (Tastes So Sweet)") is a song by American recording duo iiO. It was chosen as the lead single from their debut studio album, Poetica (2005). The song was written by both the members, Nadia Ali and Markus Moser, while production was handled just by Moser. The song was released in the United Kingdom on October 29, 2001, by Made Records, Data Records, and Ministry of Sound. In the United States, it was released via Universal Records in January 2002.

With the song winning positive reviews from music critics, citing it as catchy and one of the best songs of the year, the song was a commercial success. The song charted inside the top 10 in several countries, including the United Kingdom, Australia, Canada, Ireland, New Zealand, and Romania. "Rapture" also reached the top 50 on the US Billboard Hot 100, peaking at number 46 in March 2002. A music video was also shot, showing the group in a futuristic city with visual lighting.

In 2010, the song was re-released by former iiO frontwoman Nadia Ali as a single from her remix compilation, Queen of Clubs Trilogy: the Best of Nadia Ali Remixed. This version was her most successful solo release, peaking at number three in Romania while also charting in several European countries.

== Background and composition ==
Nadia Ali was working in the New York offices of Versace, when a co-worker introduced her to producer Markus Moser, who was looking for a female singer to collaborate on some of his productions for a girl group. The two teamed up and started a group that was originally named "Vaiio", named after the Sony VAIO laptop Ali used to write lyrics on. They later dropped the "va", on the advice of their label, to avoid causing problems in the future with Sony. Working with Moser, she wrote the lyrics and the vocals for the songs.

According to John Bush at AllMusic, the song "is pure pop, in a dance sense: a post-trance version of vocoder-ized disco, complete with modulating Moroder bassline, an evocative female vocal, and an unmissable hook repeated endlessly."

== Critical reception ==
The song received favorable reviews from music critics. John Bush from AllMusic awarded the song two stars out of five, however. Steward Mason from the same publication highlighted the song as an album standout, saying "The gathered single sides, "Kiss You," "[Rapture]," "Smooth," and "At the End," are here in new and more pop-oriented mixes that show off not only Moser's knack for melody, but also the duo's key asset: singer [Nadia Ali]'s alluring purr of a voice."

StickyBoots from About.com said "'Rapture'... surely you've heard this track countless times, whether in the club, on the radio, or on your favorite mix compilation, and surely you have some specific memory that it conjures up."

== Chart performance ==
Commercially, the song was a huge success worldwide. The song peaked inside the top 40 in several countries, including Belgium, Denmark, Finland, the Netherlands, and Sweden. The song peaked inside the top 50 in the United States, peaking at 46 on the US Billboard Hot 100. The song also peaked at number two in the United Kingdom and the US Billboard Dance Club Play chart, as well as number four in Canada.

"Rapture" was successful in both Australia and New Zealand. The song debuted inside the top 20 of the Australian Singles Chart while debuting inside the top 40 of the New Zealand Singles Chart. The track eventually peaked within the top 10 in both countries, at numbers three and eight, respectively.

== Music video ==
The video to "Rapture" was directed by Andy Hylton and features the duo throughout. The video takes place in a futuristic city where Nadia Ali is seen in a room full of machines that scan her, digitize her, and project a hologram of her high above the city, while Markus Moser is seen driving his car through the city.

The 2008 release of Rapture Reconstruction features a limited re-edited video as a multimedia bonus. It does not change the "storyline" of the clip, but includes many different angles and scenes to the original version.

== Track listings ==
UK CD single
No.	Title	Length
1.	"Rapture" (radio edit)
2.	"Rapture" (Creamer & Stephane K. remix)
3.	"Rapture" (original mix)
4.	"Rapture" (video)

UK 12-inch single
No.	Title	Length
1.	"Rapture" (Creamer & Stephane K. remix)
2.	"Rapture" (Riva remix)

UK cassette single
No.	Title	Length
1.	"Rapture" (radio edit)
2.	"Rapture" (original mix)

Australia CD single
No.	Title	Length
1.	"Rapture" (radio edit)
2.	"Rapture" (John Creamer and Stephane K. remix)
3.	"Rapture" (Deep Dish Space remix)
4.	"Rapture" (Riva remix)
5.	"Rapture" (original extended mix)

== Charts ==
=== Weekly charts ===
Weekly chart performance for "Rapture"
Chart (2001–2002)	Peak position
Australia (ARIA)	3
Australian Club Chart (ARIA)	1
Australian Dance (ARIA)	1
Austria (Ö3 Austria Top 40)	59
Belgium (Ultratop 50 Flanders)	21
Belgium (Ultratop 50 Wallonia)	28
Canada (Nielsen SoundScan)	4
Canada CHR (Nielsen BDS)	19
Czech Republic (IFPI)	18
Denmark (Tracklisten)	10
Europe (Eurochart Hot 100)	12
France (SNEP)	50
Finland (Suomen virallinen lista)	12
Germany (GfK)	51
Greece (IFPI)	3
Hungary (Mahasz)	10
Ireland (IRMA)	9
Ireland Dance (IRMA)	1
Netherlands (Dutch Top 40)	21
Netherlands (Single Top 100)	34
New Zealand (Recorded Music NZ)	8
Portugal (AFP)	3
Romania (Romanian Top 100)	2
Scotland Singles (Official Charts)	2
Spain (Promusicae)	12
Sweden (Sverigetopplistan)	25
Switzerland (Schweizer Hitparade)	64
UK Singles (Official Charts)	2
UK Dance (Official Charts)	1
US Billboard Hot 100	46
US Dance Club Play (Billboard)	2
US Mainstream Top 40 (Billboard)	17
US Maxi-Singles Sales (Billboard)	3
US Rhythmic Top 40 (Billboard)	27

=== Year-end charts ===
2001 year-end chart performance for "Rapture"
Chart (2001)	Position
Australian Club Chart (ARIA)	2
Canada (Nielsen SoundScan)	70
Ireland (IRMA)	81
Romania (Romanian Top 100)	90
UK Singles (OCC)	61

2002 year-end chart performance for "Rapture"
Chart (2002)	Position
Australia (ARIA)	62
Australian Dance (ARIA)	7
Brazil (Crowley)	51
Canada (Nielsen SoundScan)	35
US Mainstream Top 40 (Billboard)	88
US Maxi-Singles Sales (Billboard)	12

== Certifications ==
Certifications and sales for "Rapture"
Region	Certification	Certified units/sales
Australia (ARIA)	Platinum	70,000^{^}
Greece (IFPI Greece)	Gold	10,000^{^}
United Kingdom (BPI)	Silver	200,000^{^}
^{^} Shipments figures based on certification alone.

== Release history ==
Release dates and formats for "Rapture"
Region	Date	Format(s)	Label(s)	Ref(s).
United Kingdom	October 29, 2001	12-inch vinyl; CD; cassette	Made; Data; Ministry of Sound	
Australia	November 19, 2001	CD	Made; Data; Ministry of Sound	
France	November 20, 2001	CD	Hot Tracks	
United States	January 28, 2002	Contemporary hit radio	Universal	

== Nadia Ali re-release ==
"Rapture"

Single by Nadia Ali

from the album Queen of Clubs Trilogy: Onyx Edition and Queen of Clubs Trilogy: Diamond Edition
- Released: December 3, 2010
- Label: Smile in Bed
- Songwriters: Nadia Ali; Markus Moser
- Producers: Avicii; Tristan Garner; Gareth Emery

Nadia Ali singles chronology
"Fantasy" (2010)	"Rapture" (2010)	"Pressure" (2011)

Music video
- "Rapture" (Avicii remix) on YouTube

Nadia Ali re-released the song as a single from her remix compilation Queen of Clubs Trilogy. Released as the only single from the compilation, it was remixed by Avicii, Gareth Emery and Tristan Garner. Ali said she chose the three to remix the track because they were considered tastemakers in electronic dance music. She said she also chose to re-release the track because she wanted to introduce it to a new generation of music listeners who were not familiar with the original iiO version.

=== Music video ===
The music video for "Rapture" was shot in December 2010 in Sacramento, California and directed by Brando Neverland. The video premiered on January 24, 2011, on YouTube and was set to the Avicii Remix. The concept of the video portrays Ali's elevation as the "Queen of Clubs".

=== Track listing ===
No.	Title	Length
1.	"Rapture" (Avicii New Generation radio edit)	3:42
2.	"Rapture" (Avicii New Generation remix)	7:08
3.	"Rapture" (Tristan Garner Elevation radio edit)	3:42
4.	"Rapture" (Tristan Garner Elevation remix)	8:02
5.	"Rapture" (Gareth Emery radio edit)	3:37
6.	"Rapture" (Gareth Emery remix)	7:16

=== Charts ===
==== Weekly charts ====
Weekly chart performance for "Rapture"
Chart (2010–2012)	Peak position
Australian Dance (ARIA)	21
Belgium (Ultratop 50 Flanders)	28
Belgium (Ultratip Bubbling Under Wallonia)	17
CIS Airplay (TopHit) Avicii remix	57
France (SNEP)	24
Netherlands (Single Top 100)	77
Romania (Romanian Top 100)	3
Romania Airplay (Media Forest) Avicii remix	1
Slovakia Airplay (ČNS IFPI)	23
Switzerland (Schweizer Hitparade)	63
UK Singles (Official Charts)	40
UK Dance (Official Charts)	7
UK Indie (Official Charts)	3

==== Year-end charts ====
Year-end chart performance for "Rapture"
Chart (2011)	Position
Romania (Romanian Top 100)	40
Chart (2012)	Position
UK Singles (OCC)	191

=== Release history ===
Release dates and formats for "Rapture"
Region	Date	Format(s)	Label(s)	Ref.
Netherlands	December 3, 2010	Armada	Digital download	
Belgium	December 3, 2010	Armada	Digital download	
United States	December 8, 2010	Smile in Bed	Digital download	
Germany	December 21, 2010	PinkStar	Digital download	
Spain	January 12, 2011	Blanco Y Negro	Digital download	
Norway	January 14, 2011	Catchy Tunes	Digital download	
Sweden	January 14, 2011	Catchy Tunes	Digital download	
United Kingdom	March 27, 2011	Ministry of Sound	Digital download	
Australia	April 8, 2011	Ministry of Sound	Digital download	

== Cover versions ==
- Hong Kong singer Sandy Lam covered the song in Cantonese under the title "Diva" on her album Encore in 2002.
- British group Bananarama released their own version of the song on their album Viva in 2009.
- British DJ Kryder released his version of the song in early 2021 with vocals from Natalie Shay.
- Scottish DJ Paluma released his version of the song in 2022 with original vocals from Nadia Ali. Also Scottish DJ Kevin McKay remixed Paluma`s track in 2023 Rapture with original vocal from iiO`s singer Nadia Ali.

== Samples ==
The Raye song "Regardless" samples "Rapture", which resulted in an iiO writing credit.

== See also ==
- List of number-one dance singles of 2001 (Australia)
- List of number-one dance singles of 2002 (Australia)
