= Embers (Nadia Ali album) =

Studio album by Nadia Ali
- Released: September 15, 2009
- Recorded: 2005–2009
- Genre: Pop
- Length: 56:49
- Label: Smile in Bed Records
- Producers: Nadia Ali, Sultan + Ned Shepard, Scott 'Fritzy' Fritz, Alex Sayz, Nick Wahlberg

Nadia Ali chronology
Embers (2009)	Queen of Clubs Trilogy: Ruby Edition (2010)

Singles from Embers
- 1. "Crash and Burn" Released: June 17, 2008; 2. "Love Story" Released: March 10, 2009; 3. "Fine Print" Released: July 1, 2009; 4. "Fantasy" Released: April 27, 2010

Professional ratings
Review scores
Source	Rating
Racket Magazine	8/10 stars
About.com	4/5 stars

Embers is the debut album of Libyan-born American singer-songwriter and former iiO front-woman Nadia Ali, released on September 15, 2009, by Smile in Bed Records. The album features Billboard Hot Dance Club Songs number one single "Love Story", top 4 single "Fine Print" and top 6 single "Crash and Burn". On December 1, 2010, the Morgan Page remix of "Fantasy" was nominated in the Best Remixed Recording, Non-Classical category at the 53rd Grammy Awards.

== Background ==
Nadia Ali gained prominence as the front-woman of the house act iiO, with their single "Rapture". She left the band in 2005 to pursue a solo project. Ali stated it took her over four years to produce the album as she was busy touring and because she was still learning as an artist and trying to establish her identity as a songwriter and co-producer. Further describing the delay, she said "I think every artist is constantly evolving. It was important for me to showcase my more thoughtful side." Ali collaborated with producers Fritzy, Sultan and Ned Shepard and Alex Sayz and co-produced each track on the album. She wrote all the tracks on the album besides "Promises".

She decided to name the album Embers because, as she said, "most of the songs that I wrote were about relationships that I've experienced and how they leave like tiny embers inside me still". Explaining further she stated "Embers are the smoldering remains of a fire that was once ablaze. It represents all of the feelings that still remain even when that particular situation [or] relationship is over".

Talking about the songs on the album she mentioned that she chose "Fantasy" as the last single on her album, because of how it summed her up "as an emotional songwriter who loves being a part of electronic music". Speaking about ballads on the album, she stated that she didn't want a typical dance album but more variety so she chose to go "experimental".

== Track listing ==
No.	Title	Writer(s)	Producer(s)	Length
1.	"Triangle"	Nadia Ali	Nadia Ali, Ossama Al Sarraf & Ned Shepard	5:41
2.	"Crash and Burn"	Nadia Ali	Nadia Ali & Scott 'Fritzy' Fritz	4:11
3.	"People"	Nadia Ali	Nadia Ali, Ossama Al Sarraf & Ned Shepard	4:49
4.	"Ride With Me"	Nadia Ali	Nadia Ali, Alex Sayz & Nick Wahlberg	3:30
5.	"Not Thinking"	Nadia Ali	Nadia Ali & Scott 'Fritzy' Fritz	3:03
6.	"Be Mine"	Nadia Ali	Nadia Ali & Scott 'Fritzy' Fritz	3:47
7.	"Silver Lining"	Nadia Ali	Nadia Ali & Scott 'Fritzy' Fritz	6:03
8.	"Point the Finger"	Nadia Ali	Nadia Ali, Alex Sayz & Nick Wahlberg	2:57
9.	"Mistakes"	Nadia Ali	Nadia Ali & Scott 'Fritzy' Fritz	3:54
10.	"Fine Print"	Nadia Ali	Nadia Ali, Alex Sayz & Nick Wahlberg	5:30
11.	"Promises"	Paul Bosko	Nadia Ali & Scott 'Fritzy' Fritz	3:59
12.	"Love Story"	Nadia Ali	Nadia Ali, Ossama Al Sarraf & Ned Shepard	4:05
13.	"Fantasy"	Nadia Ali	Nadia Ali, Ossama Al Sarraf & Ned Shepard	5:15

== Personnel ==
The following people contributed to Embers:

- Ossama Al Sarraf – Record producer, engineer and mixer
- Nadia Ali – songwriting, vocals and producer
- Paul Bosko – songwriting (track 11)
- Scott 'Fritzy' Fritz – producer, engineer and mixer
- Dave Kutch – mastering
- Gabriella Manrique – graphic design
- Nausheen Shah – styling
- Ned Shepard – producer, engineer and mixer
- Alex Sayz – producer, engineer and mixer
- Nick Wahlberg – producer, engineer and mixer
- Jade Young – photography
