= Eleve11 =

Studio album by Sander van Doorn
- Released: September 19, 2011
- Recorded: 2010–2011
- Genre: Progressive house, trance, dance
- Length: 77:00
- Label: Ultra, Spinnin', DOORN Records
- Producer: Sander van Doorn

Sander van Doorn chronology
Dusk Till Doorn (2010)	Eleve11 (2011)

Singles from Eleve11
- 1. "Koko" Released: 31 December 2010; 2. "Love Is Darkness" Released: 7 February 2011; 3. "Timezone"; 4. "Drink to Get Drunk" Released: 7 October 2011; 5. "Who's Is Wearing the Cap" Released: 20 November 2011

Eleve11 is the third studio album by Sander van Doorn. It was released in September 2011.

== Track listing ==
1. "Love Is Darkness (feat. Carol Lee)" – 6:22
2. "Koko" – 3:56
3. "Believe (feat. Tom Helsen)" – 3:41
4. "Nano" – 4:29
5. "Rolling The Dice (with Sidney Samson & Nadia Ali)" – 3:50
6. "Beyond Sound (The Godskitchen Urban Wave Mix)" – 4:19
7. "Timezone (feat. Frederick)" – 6:20
8. "Drink To Get Drunk" – 4:16
9. "Who's Wearing the Cap (feat. Laidback Luke)" – 3:00
10. "Slap My Pitch Up (with Sexy Penguins)" – 5:02
11. "Eagles (with Adrian Lux) / Intro (The xx Booty Mix)" – 19:05

Hidden track: when track 11 ends, there is a long silence before the hidden bonus track "Intro (The xx Booty Mix)" (at 13:35) starts.

== Charts ==
Charts	Peak position
Netherlands	62
