= Shivers (album) =

Studio album by Armin van Buuren
- Released: 8 August 2005
- Length: 72:48
- Label: Armada
- Producer: Armin van Buuren

Armin van Buuren chronology
| A State of Trance 2005 (2005) | Shivers (2005) | A State of Trance 2006 (2006) |

Singles from Shivers
- 1. "Shivers" Released: 11 April 2005; 2. "Serenity" Released: 20 June 2005

Professional ratings
Review scores
| Source | Rating |
|---|---|
| AllMusic | 3.5/5 stars |
| BBC | Unfavourable |

Shivers is the second studio album by Dutch DJ and record producer Armin van Buuren. It was released on 8 August 2005 by Armada Music.

The title track of the album appeared on the home version of the music video game Dance Dance Revolution SuperNova in 2006.

In 2021, the song "Shivers" was voted by fans as the #1 song in the 20-year history of A State of Trance in episode #1000.

== Track listing ==
| No. | Title | Writer(s) | Length |
|---|---|---|---|
| 1. | "Wall of Sound" (featuring Justine Suissa) | Armin van Buuren; Justine Suissa | 6:25 |
| 2. | "Empty State" (featuring Mic Burns) | van Buuren; Markus Schulz; Mic Burns | 7:30 |
| 3. | "Shivers" (featuring Susana) | van Buuren; Adrian Broekhuyse; Raz Nitzan | 7:33 |
| 4. | "Golddigger" (featuring Martijn Hagens) | van Buuren; Martijn Hagens | 4:46 |
| 5. | "Zocalo" (featuring Gabriel & Dresden) | van Buuren; Josh Gabriel; Dave Dresden | 8:40 |
| 6. | "Gypsy" (featuring Ray Wilson) | van Buuren | 5:26 |
| 7. | "Who Is Watching" (featuring Nadia Ali) | van Buuren; Ashkan Fardost; Nadia Ali | 5:08 |
| 8. | "Bounce Back" (featuring Remy and Roland Klinkenberg) | van Buuren; DJ Remy; Roland Klinkenberg | 7:34 |
| 9. | "Control Freak" | van Buuren | 8:08 |
| 10. | "Serenity" (featuring Jan Vayne) ("Serenity" – 0:00–8:26 / "Hymne" (hidden song) – 8:52–11:37) | van Buuren; Jan Vayne | 11:37 |
| Total length: | | | 72:47 |

iTunes bonus track
| No. | Title | Length |
|---|---|---|
| 11. | "Simple Things" (featuring Justine Suissa) | 7:11 |
| Total length: | | 79:58 |

US Beatport bonus tracks
| No. | Title | Length |
|---|---|---|
| 10. | "Serenity" (featuring Jan Vayne) | 8:28 |
| 11. | "Hymne" | 2:44 |
| 12. | "Golddigger" (featuring Martijn Hagens) (Dirty Mix) | 4:46 |
| Total length: | | 77:08 |

== Charts ==
| Chart (2005) | Peak position |
|---|---|
| Dutch Albums (Album Top 100) | 23 |
