= Remix (magazine) =

Former U.S. music magazine

Remix Magazine (Music)
- July 2008 issue of Remix featuring The Roots, Booka Shade and Nortec Collective.
- Editor: Chris Gill (1999-2003), Kylee Swenson (2003-2009)
- Art Director: Alex Butkus
- Categories: Electronic/Urban Music, Production and Performance
- Frequency: Monthly
- Publisher: Primedia Business Magazines & Media Inc.
- First issue: 1999
- Final issue: January 2009
- Company: Penton Media, Inc.
- Country: United States
- Based in: Emeryville, California
- Language: English
- Website: remixmag.com

Remix was a monthly magazine for DJs, audio engineers, record producers, and performers of electronic and hip-hop music. It was started in 1999 as a quarterly magazine and was published monthly beginning in January 2001. The magazine focused on recording and live-performance hardware, electronic music instruments, and music-production hardware and computer software. It was headquartered in Emeryville, California.

The final issue of Remix was dated January 2009.
