= Rosko =

American singer-songwriter

Paul Bosko
- Rosko performance at Avalon in 2006

Background information
- Born: Paul Eric Bosko
- Genres: Electronic, folk, rock, house
- Occupations: Singer, songwriter, producer
- Years active: 2003–present
- Labels: NY Love Records, Ultra, Dusk Recordings

Paul Eric Bosko, also known as Rosko, is an American singer, songwriter, musician and producer. He is perhaps best known as a recording artist for his 2005 single "Love Is A Drug" which reached number 1 on the U.S. Billboard Dance Chart, and was produced by John Creamer & Stephane K. He is also known for his collaborations with Grammy Award-Nominated Electronic/Dance artist Nadia Ali, which include their 2006 duet "Something To Lose" for Ultra Records, and the song "Promises" on Ali's 2009 solo album "Embers."

== History ==
Paul Bosko began collaborating on house music projects in 2003 with New York-based DJ/producers John Creamer & Stephane K, and when Creamer and his club scene counterparts nicknamed him "Rosko," it eventually stuck and became his moniker as a recording and performing artist in the electronic and dance music industry.

Paul Bosko's musical work, ranging from folk-pop to alternative dance, sometimes featured DJ/producer Lance Jordan in a co-producing role, and occasionally as co-writer and lead guitarist as well. Bosko and Jordan met in 2001 at a Music and Internet Expo sponsored by mp3.com at Madison Square Garden.

In 2003 the duo were shopping an album they made together, "Paul Bosko/Dressed To Play," when they began searching for remixers, and caught the attention of Creamer & K, who had just been named 2002 Remixers of the Year by Remix Magazine. C & K joined the project as producers.

The 2005 anthem Love Is A Drug would become his first big hit on the Billboard Hot Dance Music/Club Play chart, going all the way to #1. The fusion of Rosko's bluesy, classic guitar-rock style, combined with the pioneering house music grooves of the production team, is self-described as "Rock/House" (as in "rock the house," or "to infuse house music with rock and roll elements").

"Love Is A Drug" went on to appear on several dance compilations, including Grammy Award-winning Peter Rauhofer's 2006 album "I Love New York." The single was followed by another Creamer and K collaboration, this time a duet with Nadia Ali of iio, titled "Something To Lose." The duet was signed by Ultra Records, and championed on the UK's BBC Radio 1 by influential DJ and tastemaker Pete Tong. Subsequently, Ultra quickly licensed the record to Roger Sanchez's "Release Yourself vol. 5," as well as to the Global Underground solo debut of DJ/Producer Sharam (of the Grammy Award-winning duo Deep Dish), titled "Dubai." Another Rosko single, "Milkbone," was released in September 2006 by Lance Jordan's own independent label, Dusk Recordings.

== See also ==
- List of number-one dance hits (United States)
- List of artists who reached number one on the US Dance chart
