= Fantasy (Nadia Ali song) =

Single by Nadia Ali

from the album Embers
- Released: April 27, 2010
- Genre: EDM
- Length: 5:30
- Label: Smile in Bed Records
- Songwriter: Nadia Ali
- Producers: Nadia Ali, Ossama Al Sarraf and Ned Shepard

Nadia Ali singles chronology
"Fine Print" (2009)	"Fantasy" (2010)	"Rapture" (2010)

Music video
- "Fantasy (Morgan Page Remix)" on YouTube; "Fantasy (Radio Edit)" on YouTube

"Fantasy" is the fourth single from American singer-songwriter Nadia Ali's solo debut album Embers. It was released on April 27, 2010 by Smile in Bed Records.

== Background ==
"Fantasy" is written by Nadia Ali and produced by Ali and the DJ duo Sultan and Ned Shepard. It was chosen as a single from Embers by fans after a poll conducted by Ali on her Facebook page between "Fantasy" and "Point the Finger".

Ali has spoken about "Fantasy" that she always wanted it as a single as she felt the song had really powerful emotions. She mentioned that the track sums her up as how she wants to be recognized "an emotional songwriter who loves being a part of electronic music".

The Morgan Page remix of "Fantasy" went on to be nominated in the Best Remixed Recording, Non-Classical category at the 53rd Grammy Awards.

== Music video ==
The music video for "Fantasy" featured Ali as the Queen of Clubs.

The music video for "Fantasy" was directed by Ryan Littman and Berman Fenelus and filmed at the Tribeca Cinemas in New York in April, 2010. The concept of the video was the transformation and elevation of Ali as the 'Queen of Clubs'. The theme of the video was used to promote Ali's upcoming greatest hits collection,Queen of Clubs Trilogy: The Best of Nadia Ali Remixed.

The idea of the video was to show the culture which Ali's music embodies. There are four main sequences to the song, the first showing Ali singing the song, the second shows Ali dancing with male backup dancers, while the third shows her singing with her arms enwrapped and tied to black cloth hanging from the wall. The climax of the video shows Ali seated on a table with turntables and the Kings of Spades, Clubs, Hearts and Diamonds seated around her. The scenes were intercut with each other and special effects created using Parafluid, a magnetic fluid used to create fractile-based structures. Ali wears 4 different couture pieces in the music video, which were custom designed or runway pieces by up-and-coming New York designers.

Debuting the Morgan Page remix of the song, the video premiered on May 25, 2010 on YouTube. On July 28, 2010, Ali released an alternative music video featuring the album version of the song. This video features almost entirely new footage, and is in black and white. Intersecting scenes of clouds, Nadia with her Kings of Spades and Clubs, the video also features famed contortionist Jonathan Nosan.

== Track listing ==
- Fantasy - EP

No.	Title	Length
1.	"Fantasy (Radio Edit)"	4:05
2.	"Fantasy (EDX Radio Edit)"	3:26
3.	"Fantasy (Starkillers Radio Edit)"	2:58
4.	"Fantasy (Tritonal Air Up There Radio Edit)"	3:59

- Fantasy (Extended Club Remixes)

No.	Title	Length
1.	"Fantasy (EDX Remix)"	8:18
2.	"Fantasy (Starkillers Remix)"	7:04
3.	"Fantasy (Tritonal Air Up There Remix)"	9:09
4.	"Fantasy (Tritonal Air Up There Intro Mix)"	9:09

- Fantasy Remixes, Pt.2

No.	Title	Length
1.	"Fantasy (Morgan Page Radio Edit)"	4:09
2.	"Fantasy (Rachael Starr Radio Edit)"	3:59

- Fantasy (Extended Club Remixes) Pt.2

No.	Title	Length
1.	"Fantasy (Morgan Page Remix)"	8:39
2.	"Fantasy (Rachael Starr Remix)"	8:27
