= Nadia Ali (singer) =

American singer-songwriter (born 1980)

Nadia Ali نادیہ علی
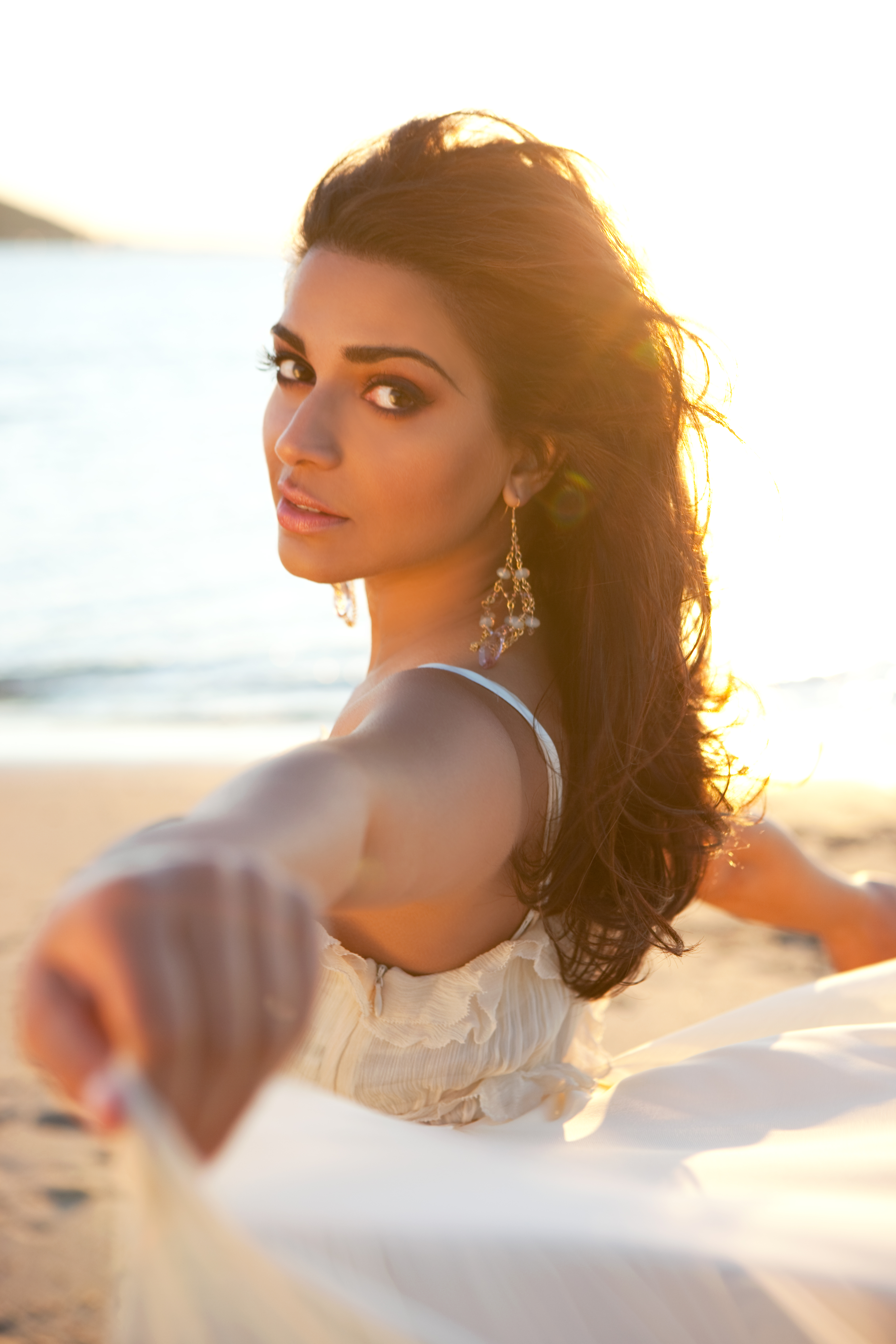
- Ali in 2009

Background information
- Born: August 3, 1980 (age 46); Tripoli, Libya
- Origin: Queens, New York City, U.S.
- Genres: Trance; house; indie pop; vocal trance
- Occupations: Singer; songwriter
- Years active: 1997–present
- Labels: Smile in Bed; Armada; Strictly Rhythm; Spinnin' Records
- Formerly of: iiO
- Website: nadiaali.com

Nadia Ali (born August 3, 1980) is an American singer and songwriter. Ali gained prominence in 2001 as the frontwoman and songwriter of the group iiO after their debut single "Rapture" gained significant success in Europe, most notably the United Kingdom, where the song peaked at number two on the UK Singles Chart in November 2001. Their 2006 single, "Is It Love?", reached the top of the Billboard Hot Dance Club Play chart.

After embarking on a solo career in 2005, Ali became a vocalist in electronic dance music. She released her debut album Embers in 2009. Three singles from the album reached the top-ten of the Billboard Hot Dance Club Play chart, including the No. 1 hit, "Love Story".

In 2010, Ali released a remix album series titled Queen of Clubs Trilogy to mark her decade-long career as a singer. "Rapture" was re-released as the only single from the trilogy and the song was once again a chart success in Europe. Ali released the single "Pressure" with Starkillers and Alex Kenji in 2011, which became a club and festival anthem and received an International Dance Music Award. In 2012, she collaborated with BT and Arty on the single "Must Be the Love". She released the song "Almost Home" with Sultan + Shepard in 2017, which reached No. 4 on the Billboard Dance/Mix Show Airplay chart and received a Juno Award nomination.

In 2018, she debuted a new direction and sound under the experimental project titled HYLLS, which saw her departing from electronic dance music toward the indie pop genre.

In 2022, she collaborated with Michael Calfan and released a song titled "3, 2, 1".

== Life and career ==
=== 1980–2005: Early life and iiO ===
Nadia Ali was born in Tripoli, Libya to Pakistani parents on August 3, 1980. The family relocated when she was five years old and she was subsequently raised in Queens, New York City.

Ali started working in the New York offices of Versace when she was 17. A colleague from Versace introduced her to producer Markus Moser, who was looking for a female-singer (or "chanteuse") to collaborate on some of his original productions for a girl group in Germany. The two teamed up with Moser working on production, while Ali wrote the lyrics and vocals for the songs. Her first song was the single "Rapture", which she wrote in 30 minutes based on an encounter with an Australian nightclub patron. A demo of the song was first played at the New York club Twilo in 2001 and received early support from influential DJ Pete Tong who played the demo on his show on BBC Radio 1. The song eventually became an Ibiza favorite after support from prominent DJs such as Sasha, Danny Tenaglia and Sander Kleinenberg during the summer season. Released in late 2001 by Ministry of Sound, the single became a commercial success peaking at No. 2 on the UK Singles Chart and Billboard's Hot Dance Club Play chart, while charting in several countries in Europe. The success of "Rapture", Ali said, caused the formation of iiO as the music they were initially working on was quite different from dance music and were asked to come up with a project name to promote the single. They originally named themselves Vaiio after the Sony VAIO laptop Ali used to write the lyrics on. The duo toured internationally and released several more singles, including "At the End", "Runaway", "Smooth", and "Kiss You". Their first studio album, Poetica followed in 2005.

Ali left the group in 2005 to pursue a solo career, while Moser continued to release iiO material featuring her on vocals. Most notably, these releases include the 2006 single "Is It Love?" (which reached No. 1 on the Billboard Hot Dance Club Play chart), the 2007 remix album Reconstruction Time: The Best of iiO Remixed and the 2011 studio album Exit 110.

=== 2006–2009: Embers ===
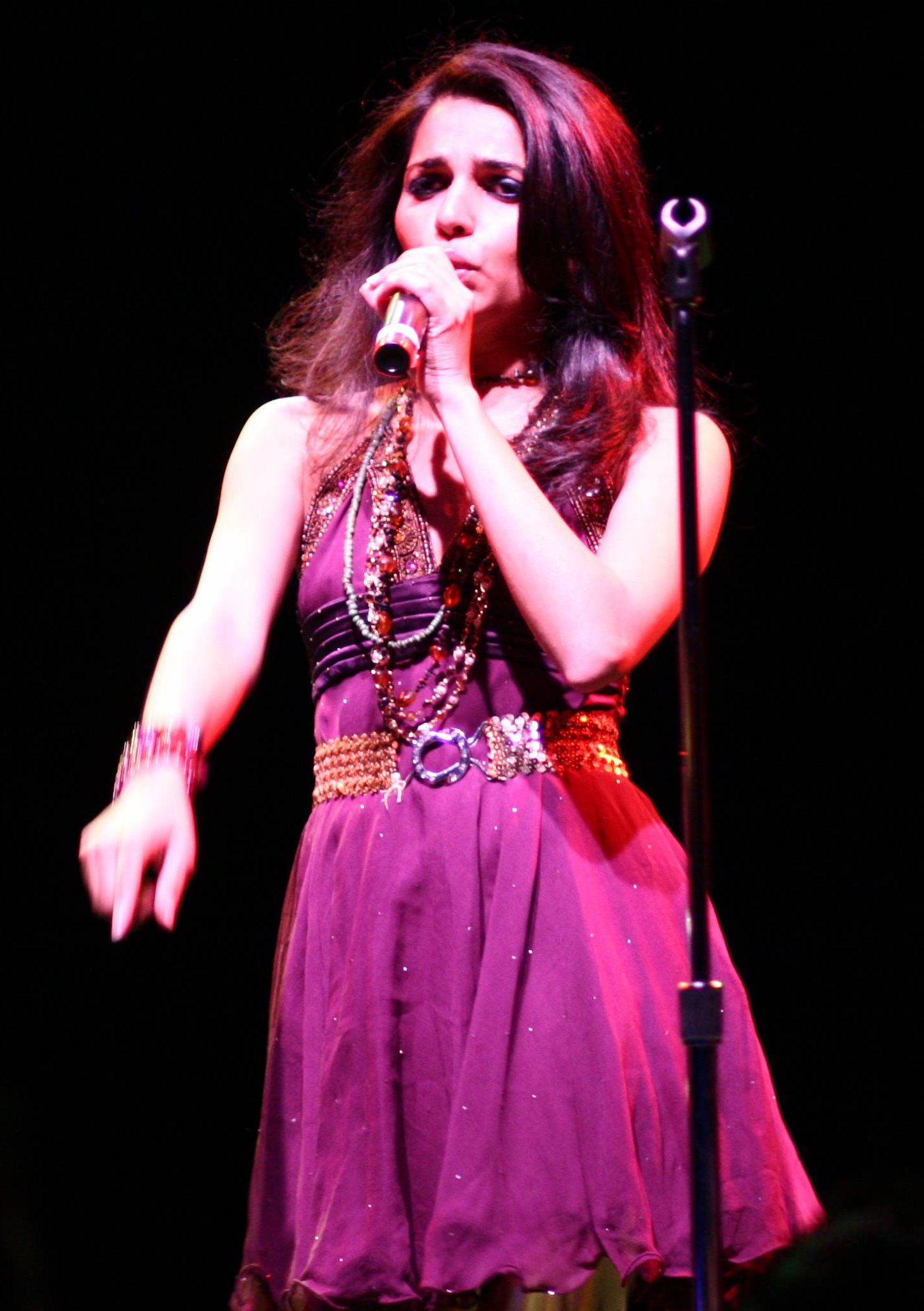
Ali performing at Avalon, Boston in 2006

Ali started working on her debut solo album soon after leaving iiO, a process which took her four years. Her first solo release was the 2006 single "Who Is Watching?", a collaboration with Dutch DJ Armin van Buuren, which is included on his album Shivers. This was followed by "Something to Lose" in 2006, a duet with singer Rosko, produced by John Creamer & Stephane K and released by Ultra Records. The track was licensed to Roger Sanchez's Release Yourself, Vol. 5, as well as Sharam Tayebi of Deep Dish for his Global Underground debut Dubai.

In June 2008, she released "Crash and Burn", the first single from her solo album. The single became a club success peaking at No. 6 on Billboard's Hot Dance Club Play chart. She released the second single, "Love Story" from the as-yet untitled album in February 2009. It topped the Billboard Hot Dance Club Play chart in April 2009 and was nominated for the Best Progressive/House Track at the 2010 International Dance Music Awards at the Winter Music Conference. Ali was featured on MTV Iggy in March 2009, where she recorded three live acoustic videos, performing "Rapture", "Crash and Burn" and "Love Story".

The third single "Fine Print" was released in July 2009. Ali announced that the single preceded the release of her debut solo album Embers. The single peaked at No. 4 on Billboard's Hot Dance Club Play chart. Embers was released in September 2009. Co-produced by Sultan & Shepard, Alex Sayz and Scott Fritz, Ali self-released the album on her own label, Smile in Bed Records. Embers generally received positive reviews; Chase Gran from About.com called it a "well rounded, gourmet album with impressive songs". Gail Navarro from Racket magazine complimented Ali on her songwriting saying, "It wasn't just her sultry sound mixed in together with that enchanting singing voice; her songwriting got me hook, line and sinker". Speaking about the self-release of the album, she has cited her creative independence and the pressure of deadlines as the main reasons why she created her own record label.

Ali released two collaborations in 2009; the first "Better Run" with Tocadisco was released on his album TOCA 128.0 FM and "12 Wives in Tehran" with Serge Devant was released on his album Wanderer.

=== 2010–2011: Queen of Clubs Trilogy ===
Ali's first release in 2010 was the track "Try", a collaboration with German producer Schiller, chosen as the lead single from his album Atemlos, the music video premiered on YouTube in February 2010. In April 2010, Ali released "Fantasy", the fourth single from Embers. The track was chosen as a single by her fans after a poll conducted by Ali on her Facebook page. The music video for "Fantasy" was set to the Morgan Page remix, which served as a prologue to Ali's next project; Queen of Clubs Trilogy: The Best of Nadia Ali Remixed. The package consisted of three releases: Ruby Edition (August 2010), Onyx Edition (October 2010) and Diamond Edition (December 2010). It featured collaborations with, and remixes by Armin van Buuren, Avicii and Gareth Emery among several other prominent DJs and producers.

I think the fact that it (electronic dance music) is mostly male dominated makes females stand out that much more if they are driven enough. I believe anything is possible with hard work.

– Nadia Ali

With a decade-long career, MTV described Ali as one of the "enduring empresses" of electronic dance music and Queen of Clubs Trilogy as "aptly titled". Noted for being the "definitive" and "unmistakable" voice of dance music, she is said to have "enriched" and "invigorated" the genre. Ali has gone on to become an oft-requested collaborator by DJs and producers. She was praised for acquiring notability in a male and DJ-dominated genre where vocalists serve as supporting acts. She said this was a double-edged sword as she was also treated as competition by DJs. In December 2010, she received her first Grammy nomination when the Morgan Page remix of "Fantasy" was nominated in the Best Remixed Recording, Non-Classical category.

Her first track with iiO, "Rapture" was re-released as a single from Queen of Clubs Trilogy with remixes by Tristan Garner, Gareth Emery and Avicii. A new music video for the track was shot based on the "Queen of Clubs" theme and released on January 24, 2011. The song peaked at No. 3 on the Romanian Top 100 chart, while charting in other European countries.

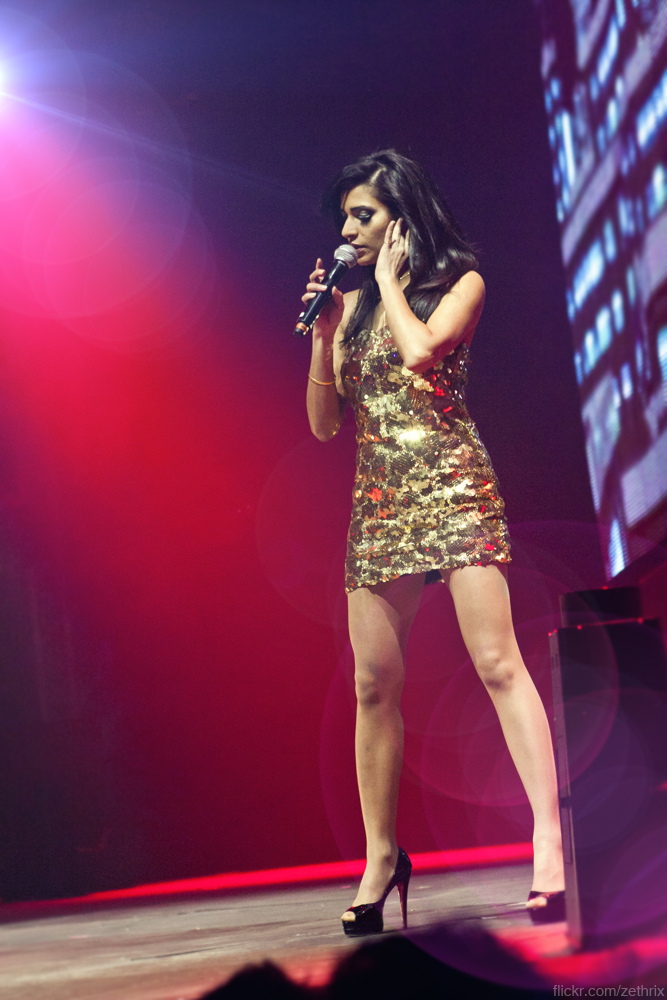
Ali performing at Armin Only in Poland

Throughout 2010, Ali's collaborations with DJs and producers were released. These included "That Day" with Dresden and Johnston, which was featured on various compilation albums. Follow-up release "The Notice" with Swiss duo Chris Reece was released on July 13. Ali was featured on the track "Feels So Good" on Armin van Buuren's fourth album Mirage. Released as the fifth single from the album, the song was voted as the Best Trance Track at the 27th International Dance Music Awards.

During 2011, Ali announced the release of collaborations with several DJs and producers. The first of these was "Call My Name" with the duo Sultan & Ned Shepard, released by Harem Records on February 9. "Call My Name" was a club success, charting at No. 5 on Billboard Hot Dance Club Play Chart. The second track "Pressure", a collaboration with Starkillers and Alex Kenji was released on February 15 by Spinnin' Records. The Alesso remix of "Pressure" became a club and festival anthem and received support from notable DJs such as Armin van Buuren, Tiesto, Swedish House Mafia and Calvin Harris and was voted the Best Progressive House Track at the 27th International Dance Music Awards.

In April, iiO released the studio album Exit 110, which featured Ali on vocals. On May 23, her next collaboration, "Free To Go" with Alex Sayz was released by Zouk Recordings. She was featured on Sander van Doorn's second studio album Eleve11 on the track "Rolling the Dice", a collaboration between van Doorn, Sidney Samson and her. Her next release was the single "Believe It" with the German duo Spencer & Hill, which was released on October 3 by Wall Recordings. She collaborated once again with Starkillers on the single "Keep It Coming", which was released on December 26 by Spinnin' Records which reached No 1 in Beatport.

=== 2012–2017 ===
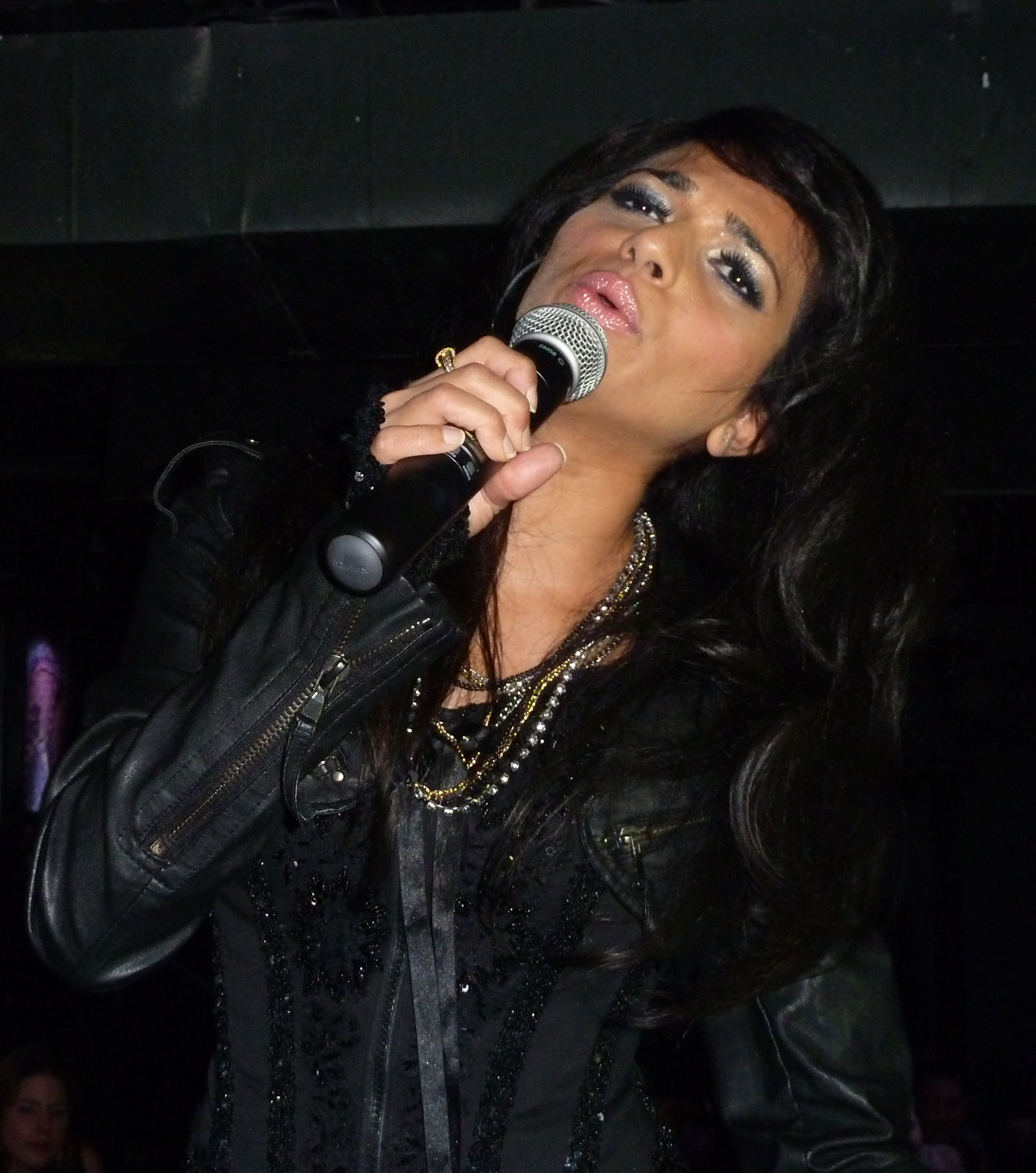
Ali performing at Josephine's in Washington, D.C., in 2011

As of February 2010, Ali had begun working on her second studio album. A music video for the lead single from the album, "When It Rains", was released on her YouTube channel in August 2011.

In May 2012, Ali announced her move to Los Angeles citing the need for a change after spending 26 years in New York City.

Her first release in 2012 was "This Is Your Life", the fourth single from Swiss DJ EDX's album On the Edge. That was followed by "Carry Me", a collaboration with Morgan Page, the fourth single from his third studio album, In the Air. Her next release was "Must Be the Love", the lead single from BT's ninth studio album A Song Across Wires, which was a collaboration between him, Arty and Ali. In 2012, she also pre-announced her album "Phoenix", which, as of September 2015, had not shipped.

In December 2012, Ali announced her engagement to her fiancé, whom she married in October 2013.

In January 2014, Ali released an acoustic cover of The Police song "Roxanne" as a free download. In September 2015, Ali released the single "All In My Head", a collaboration with PANG!. The release was her first single as a lead artist since 2011.

In July 2017, after a hiatus of two years, Ali was featured on "Almost Home", a collaboration with Sultan & Shepard and IRO, which peaked at No.4 on the Billboard Dance/Mix Show Airplay chart. The song was nominated for the Dance Recording of the Year at the 2018 Juno Awards.

=== 2018–present: HYLLS ===
Ali announced the launch of a new project titled HYLLS, with a new sound and direction, while releasing one song a month during 2018. With the project, Ali has transitioned from electronic music to an indie pop sound. Ali stated that this project was experimental and completely different from her previous work, which is why she chose to release it under a different name. She has collaborated with several Grammy-nominated producers for the project, who have chosen to remain anonymous. The first single "All Over The Place" was released in January. The second single "Linger", a cover of The Cranberries song was released on February 16. The project culminated in a studio album Once released in March 2019.

In August 2018, Ali gave birth to a son and revealed she suffered from postpartum depression for 5 months following his birth.

== Musical style and influences ==
Ali is perhaps best known for her characteristic voice and vocal abilities. Reema Kumari Jadeja from MOBO described her work as "masterfully encapsulating euphoric and melancholic, Ali's signature music style sees Eastern mystique caressed with intelligent electronica and fortified with soul". The songs on Embers were likened to Madonna's work in her prime and a "modern re-interpretation" of Stevie Nicks. Billboard praised her voice for having "too much life on its own". Ali has been influenced by an eclectic mix of artists, which she credits to her Eastern background and upbringing in Queens. She listed alternative, folk, and Pakistani music as her biggest influences. Some of her vocal and songwriting influences, she said, were Stevie Nicks, Nusrat Fateh Ali Khan, Madonna, Sade, and Bono.

Her debut album was noted for a blend of electronica, acoustic, and Middle Eastern melodies. She has been praised for her songwriting, describing personal experiences with people, which "hit a powerful and striking chord" with the listener. After a hiatus of several years, she released new music under the title HYLLS, where while retaining her characteristic lyrical style, she chose to move toward a more indie sound, which has been compared to The xx.

== Discography ==
Studio albums

- Embers (2009)
- Once (2019) (as HYLLS)

Compilation albums

- Queen of Clubs Trilogy: Ruby Edition (2010)
- Queen of Clubs Trilogy: Onyx Edition (2010)
- Queen of Clubs Trilogy: Diamond Edition (2010)

== Awards ==
Year	Nominee / work	Award	Result
2011	"Love Story (Sultan and Ned Shepard Remix)"	Best Progressive/House Track at 25th International Dance Music Awards	Nominated
2011	"Fantasy (Morgan Page Remix)"	Best Remixed Recording at 53rd Grammy Awards	Nominated
2012	"Feels So Good"	Best Trance Track at 27th International Dance Music Awards	Won
2012	"Pressure (Alesso Remix)"	Best Progressive Track at 27th International Dance Music Awards	Won
2018	"Almost Home"	Dance Recording of the Year at Juno Awards	Nominated
