= Sultan & Shepard =

Canadian electronic music duo

Sultan + Shepard
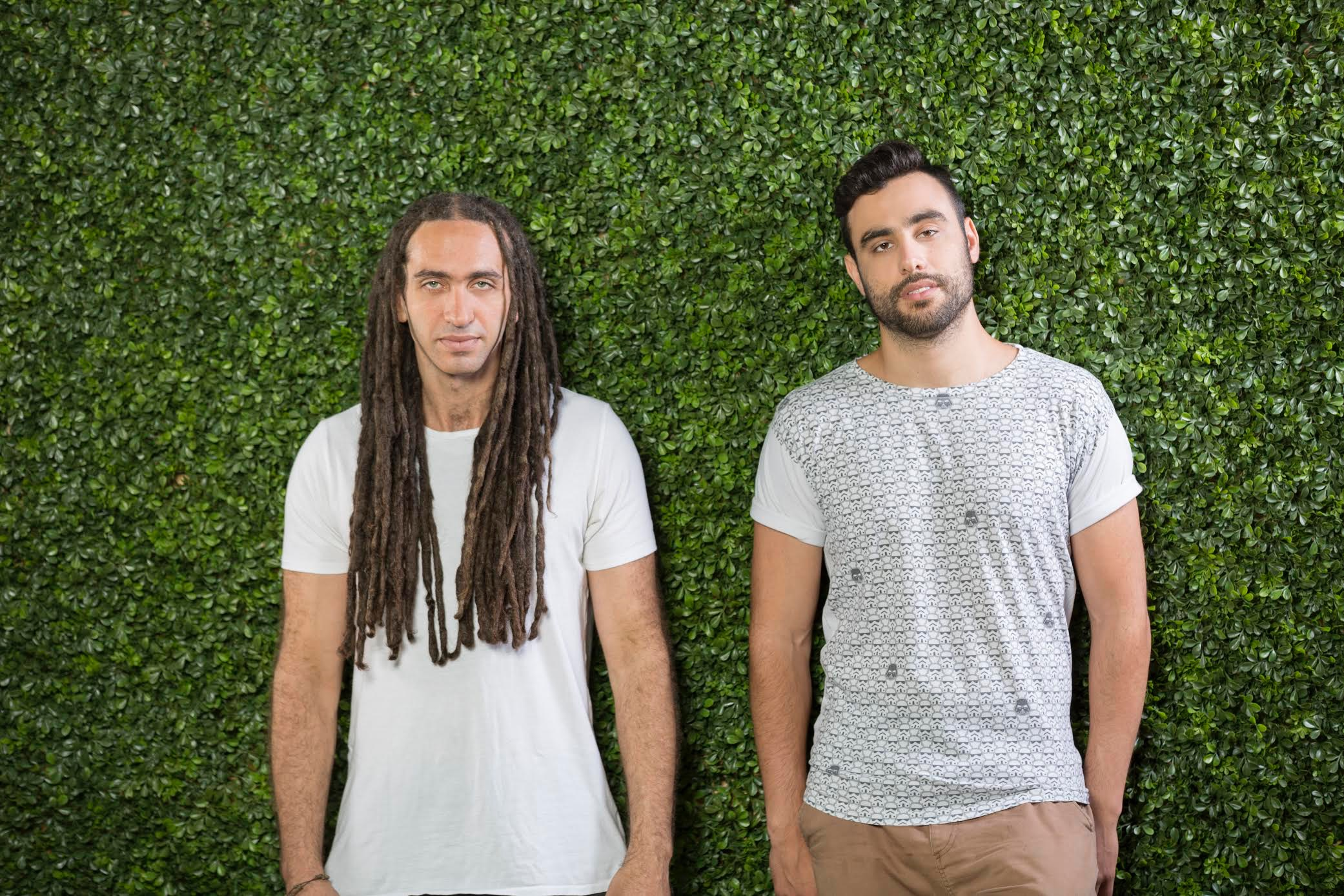
- Sultan (left) and Shepard (right)

Background information
- Origin: Montreal, Quebec, Canada
- Genres: Melodic house; progressive house; deep house
- Years active: 2002–present
- Labels: This Never Happened; Armada Music; Harem; Spinnin'; Revealed; Parametric; Mixmash
- Members: Ossama Al Sarraf (Sultan); Ned Shepard
- Website: sultanshepard.com

Sultan and Shepard (stylized as Sultan + Shepard) are a Canadian electronic music duo who frequently collaborate in record production, songwriting, and remixing.

== Biography ==
=== Background ===
Sultan, born Ossama Al Sarraf, lived in Kuwait, Cyprus, and Egypt, before moving to Montreal in 1996 to study mechanical engineering and business at McGill University. While there, he became immersed in Montreal nightlife and the house scene. A series of gigs DJing led to the release of his first track, "Primal Instinct". Sultan was signed to Chug Records in 2001. In 2004, he starred in the documentary Being Osama which detailed his Christian Palestinian roots.

In 2002, Ned Shepard, also a student at McGill DJing in Montreal, gave Sultan a demo CD of music he had been working on. Sultan called Shepard the following morning and expressed an interest in producing together.

=== Career ===
In 2008, Sultan + Shepard formed Harem Records to release their music. Their singles include "Walls" featuring Quilla, "No Good" with Fedde Le Grand, "In the Air" with Morgan Page and BT, "When We Were Young" with Dillon Francis, and "Make Things Right" featuring Tegan & Sara. In July 2018 they announced their upcoming debut artist album, slated for release in 2019. They co-wrote and co-produced the 2014 David Guetta song "Bad", co-wrote "Drove Me Wild" by Tegan & Sara from their 2013 album Heartthrob, and have collaborated with Tiësto, Junior Sanchez, The Boxer Rebellion, Vassy, and Nadia Ali.

They were nominated for a 2013 Grammy Award for Best Remixed Recording, Non-Classical for their remix of "Locked Out of Heaven" by Bruno Mars. They were nominated for a 2018 Juno Award for Dance Recording of the Year for their song "Almost Home" featuring Nadia Ali and IRO.

Shepard cites Chicane, Brian Eno, Underworld, The Chemical Brothers, Faithless, and Sasha & John Digweed among his major inspirations. Sultan cites the same artists as well as Daft Punk and Deep Dish.

== Discography ==
=== Albums ===
Title	Details
Echoes of Life: Day	Released: November 1, 2019; Label: Armada Music
Echoes of Life: Night	Released: November 8, 2019; Label: Armada Music
Something, Everything	Released: March 12, 2021; Label: This Never Happened
Forever, Now	Released: February 17, 2023; Label: This Never Happened
Endless, Dawn	Released: March 1, 2024; Label: This Never Happened

=== Extended plays ===
Title	Details
Kochi	Released: February 20, 2020; Label: This Never Happened
Guaba	Released: July 23, 2020; Label: This Never Happened
Kelam	Released: November 12, 2020; Label: This Never Happened
Break Your Fall	Released: September 9, 2021; Label: This Never Happened
Indigo	Released: December 9, 2021; Label: This Never Happened

=== Singles ===
Year	Single	Peak positions				Album
Year	Single	CAN	FR	NED Dutch 40	US Dance	Album
2007	"Together We Rise"	—	—	—	—	Non-album singles
2007	"Itajai Vibes"	—	—	—	—	Non-album singles
2007	"Connected" (featuring Stereomovies)	—	—	—	—	Non-album singles
2008	"Tomorrow Never Dies"	—	—	—	—	Non-album singles
2008	"One Day"	—	—	—	—	Non-album singles
2008	"Let's Get Physical" (featuring Zara)	—	—	—	—	Non-album singles
2008	"Jeopardy" (featuring Kuba Oms)	—	—	—	—	Non-album singles
2008	"Eye Spy"	—	—	—	—	Non-album singles
2008	"Did We"	—	—	—	—	Non-album singles
2008	"A Fine Balance"	—	—	—	—	Non-album singles
2008	"Block Party" (featuring Benny Blanco)	—	—	—	—	Non-album singles
2009	"Kitsch"	—	—	—	—	Non-album singles
2009	"Crimson Sun" (featuring Dirty Vegas)	—	—	—	—	Non-album singles
2010	"Pink Panther"	—	—	—	—	Non-album singles
2010	"Deeper Underground"	—	—	—	—	Non-album singles
2010	"Past Dreaming" (Funkagenda vs Sultan + Ned Shepard)	—	—	—	—	Non-album singles
2011	"Running" (Fedde Le Grand vs Sultan + Ned Shepard featuring Mitch Crown)	—	—	—	—	Non-album singles
2011	"In the Air" (Morgan Page, Sultan + Ned Shepard and BT featuring Angela McCluskey)	—	—	—	—	Non-album singles
2011	"Call My Name" (featuring Nadia Ali)	—	—	—	—	Non-album singles
2012	"Block Party"	—	—	—	—	Non-album singles
2012	"Somebody to Love" (featuring Dirty Vegas)	—	—	—	—	Non-album singles
2012	"Organ Donor"	—	—	—	—	Non-album singles
2012	"Walls" (featuring Quilla)	71	—	—	—	Non-album singles
2012	"Send Me Your Love" (Taryn Manning featuring Sultan + Ned Shepard)	—	—	—	1	Freedom City
2013	"Army" (Sultan + Ned Shepard and NERVO featuring Omarion)	—	—	—	—	Non-album singles
2013	"Long Way From Home" (Fedde Le Grand and Sultan + Ned Shepard)	—	—	90	—	Non-album singles
2013	"No Good" (Fedde Le Grand and Sultan + Ned Shepard)	—	60	—	—	Non-album singles
2014	"Close to Me" (Tiësto and Sultan + Ned Shepard featuring Quilla)	—	—	—	—	A Town Called Paradise
2014	"Deeper Love" (Junior Sanchez and Sultan + Ned Shepard)	—	—	—	—	Non-album singles
2014	"Keep Moving" (Sultan + Ned Shepard vs. The Boxer Rebellion)	—	—	—	—	Non-album singles
2014	"When We Were Young" (Dillon Francis and Sultan + Ned Shepard featuring The Chain Gang of 1974)	—	—	—	25	Money Sucks, Friends Rule
2015	"Make Things Right" (featuring Tegan and Sara)	—	—	—	—	Non-album singles
2015	"Don't Let Me Down" (featuring Denny White)	—	—	—	—	Non-album singles
2015	"Manila" (with Futuristic Polar Bears)	—	—	—	—	Non-album singles
2015	"In The Night"	—	—	—	—	Non-album singles
2015	"Chasing (In The Night)" (featuring Lauren Mason)	—	—	—	—	Non-album singles
2015	"Bwu" (featuring Felix Leiter)	—	—	—	—	Non-album singles
2016	"Bring Me Back" (featuring Kreesha Turner)	—	—	—	—	Non-album singles
2016	"Love Me Crazy" (featuring Gia)	—	—	—	—	Non-album singles
2016	"Samba Sixteen"	—	—	—	—	Non-album singles
2017	"Cashmere Sweater" (featuring Brezy)	—	—	—	—	Non-album singles
2017	"Damn" (featuring Red Rosamond)	—	—	—	—	Non-album singles
2017	"Honey Come Back"	—	—	—	—	Non-album singles
2017	"Almost Home" (featuring Nadia Ali and IRO)	—	—	—	—	Echoes of Life: Day
2017	"Bloom"	—	—	—	—	Echoes of Life: Night
2018	"Head Over Heels"	—	—	—	—	Non-album singles
2018	"I Got 5 On It"	—	—	—	—	Non-album singles
2018	"Louder"	—	—	—	—	Echoes of Life: Day
2018	"High on Emotion"	—	—	—	—	Echoes of Life: Day
2018	"Thinking of You"	—	—	—	—	Non-album singles
2018	"Somebody New" (Vassy featuring Sultan + Ned Shepard)	—	—	—	—	Non-album singles
2018	"Ready" (with Tritonal featuring Zach Sorgen)	—	—	—	—	U & Me and Echoes of Life: Day
2018	"Where Are You?" (featuring Andreas Moss)	—	—	—	—	Non-album single
2019	"American Dream"	—	—	—	—	Echoes of Life: Day
2019	"Deeper" (featuring Carla Monroe)	—	—	—	—	Echoes of Life: Day
2019	"We Found Love" (with Showtek)	—	—	—	—	Echoes of Life: Day
2019	"Way We Used 2" (with Showtek)	—	—	—	—	Non-album single
2019	"Miles to Your Heart" (with Rock Mafia and Bahari)	—	—	—	—	Echoes of Life: Day
2019	"And If... / Lion"	—	—	—	—	Echoes of Life: Night
2019	"Hold On / Scuba"	—	—	—	—	Echoes of Life: Night
2019	"All of Your Weapons" (featuring Mougleta)	—	—	—	—	Echoes of Life: Night
2021	"Solid Gold Love" (featuring Richard Walters)	—	—	—	—	Something, Everything
2021	"Assassin"	—	—	—	—	Something, Everything
2021	"Nctrl"	—	—	—	—	Something, Everything
2021	"Skipping Stones" (with Le Youth)	—	—	—	—	Non-album single
"—" denotes a recording that did not chart or was not released.

=== Production discography ===
- Embers, Nadia Ali (2009)
- "Bad", David Guetta & Showtek (2014)

=== Remixes ===
All remixes listed have been released on the respective song's official remix EP unless noted otherwise.

Year	Song	Artist	Album	Notes
2007	"Timelapse"	Jiva		
2008	"Fever"	Julie Dennis		
2008	"Pressure"	Dirty Vegas		
2008	"Deliver Me"	Paul Harris and Cevin Fisher		
2008	"Crash and Burn"	Nadia Ali		
2008	"Asteroidz"	DBN		
2008	"Wellness Park"	Daniel Portman		
2009	"Invisible Man"	Stephan Luke		Ned Shepard solo
2009	"Noisehead"	Bsno		Ned Shepard solo
2009	"Leave Me Alone"	Cedric Gervais		
2009	"The Take"	Paul Harris, Obernik		
2009	"You Can Be the One"	Late Night Alumni	Ultra Electro 3	
2009	"This Is Our Night"	Sander Kleinenberg		
2009	"The Rose of Jericho"	BT		
2009	"Love Story"	Nadia Ali		
2009	"I Like That"	Richard Vission		
2009	"Golden"	Second Sun		
2009	"Dust in Gravity"	Delerium		
2009	"Addicted"	Serge Devant		
2010	"Island Breeze"	Pashka		
2010	"One Hot Pleasure"	Erika Jayne		
2010	"Outcome"	Cevin Fisher, Paul Harris		
2010	"I Want You"	Dean Coleman		
2010	"Hey Sexy Lady"	i SQUARE		
2010	"Give It All Away"	DJ Rap		
2010	"Fire in Your New Shoes"	Kaskade	Club Life: Volume One Las Vegas	
2010	"Fight for You"	Morgan Page		
2010	"Century"	Tiësto	Kaleidoscope: Remixed	
2011	"Astana"	Funkagenda		
2011	"Something for the Weekend" (featuring Luciana)	Dave Aude		
2011	"Meiri"	Thomas Sagstad		
2011	"The Edge of Glory"	Lady Gaga	Born This Way: The Remix	
2011	"Drunk Text"	Manufactured Superstars		
2011	"Call Your Girlfriend"	Robyn		
2011	"Army of Love"	Kerli		
2011	"A Million Stars"	BT		
2012	"Time"	Paris & Simo		
2012	"Beautiful People at 5am"	Benny Benassi		
2012	"Send Me Your Love"	Taryn Manning		
2012	"American Flash"	Dean Cohen		
2012	"Give Me All Your Luvin'"	Madonna		
2012	"Disobey"	Kate Havnevik		
2012	"Big Hoops (Bigger the Better)"	Nelly Furtado		
2013	"Locked Out of Heaven"	Bruno Mars		Nominated for Grammy
2013	"Closer"	Tegan and Sara		
2015	"Lay It All on Me"	Rudimental featuring Ed Sheeran		
2016	"Give It Up"	Jack Wins		
2016	"Is It Love"	3lau		
2017	"All Or Nothing"	Lost Frequencies		
2018	"Gangster Tripping"	Fatboy Slim		
2018	"I Know You"	Craig David		
2018	"Mood"	Felix Cartal		
2019	"Miles to Your Heart" (Sultan & Shepard VIP Remix)	Sultan & Shepard, Rock Mafia and Bahari		
2019	"All of Your Weapons" (Sultan & Shepard VIP Remix)	Sultan & Shepard featuring Mougleta		
2019	"Keep Moving" (Sultan & Shepard Reboot)	Sultan & Shepard and The Boxer Rebellion		
2020	"Daydreams" (Sultan + Shepard Echoes Of Life Remix)	Arty featuring Cimo Fränkel		
2020	"Everytime" (Sultan + Shepard Remix)	Lustral		
2020	"Yard Two Stone" (Sultan + Shepard Remix)	Lane 8 featuring Jens Kuross		
2021	"Falling Forward" (Sultan + Shepard Remix)	Gabriel & Dresden featuring Sub Teal		
2021	"Returning To You" (Sultan + Shepard Remix)	Seven Lions and Andrew Bayer featuring Alison May	Returning To You (feat. Alison May) [Remixes]	
2022	"Survive" (Sultan + Shepard Remix)	Lane 8 featuring Channy Leaneagh		
