= John Creamer & Stephane K =

Creamer & K
- Genres: Electronic; house
- Occupations: Record producers; remixers
- Years active: 1998–present
- Label: NY Love
- Website: nyloverecords.com

John Creamer & Stephane K are an American international DJ duo, electronic music and house music production team based in New York City. They are perhaps best known for creating original dance singles as well as dance remixes for artists such as iiO, Moby, New Order, Rosko and Sinéad O'Connor.

== Early life and careers ==
John Creamer grew up in Philadelphia and began his career in New York in the mid-90s as an A&R man for Eightball Records, and later for Satellite Records, and was producing acid house before he met up with his future production partner. Stephane K (Stephane Kaneda) came to New York by way of Tokyo and Paris, and was making music with Satoshi Tomiie under the name "Bipath" when he met Creamer.

Both artists were formerly musicians, with Creamer playing trombone in a ska band in Philly, and K playing bass guitar in an alternative rock band in Tokyo, and both artists have claimed in interviews that they were converted to house music at the legendary New York nightclub, Sound Factory. They paired up as a production team in 1998, and also perform live around the world as DJs, both separately and together as a duo.

== Early 2000s – breakthrough years ==
In 2002, they were named "Remixers of the Year" by Remix Magazine. Their careers reached new heights that year when they were chosen by John Digweed to mix the 4th volume of his acclaimed "Bedrock" mixed compilation series. Their work has been featured on many DJ mixes from labels including Boxed, Bedrock, Universal Records, Global Underground, Ultra Records, Sony, BMG, London Records, Warner Brothers, and Ministry of Sound. The duo's production style often falls into the category of progressive house, and they have been recognized for having a distinctive, identifiable sound which usually incorporates steamy percussion and dark, tribal effects. The dance remixes in their portfolio include Kosheen's "Hide U," Satoshi Tomiie's "Love In Traffic," Moby's "Extreme Ways", New Order's "Crystal," Nat Monday's "Waiting," Hybrid's "True To Form," Moony's "Doves," Puretone's "Addicted To Bass," The Crystal Method's "You Know It's Hard," Sinéad O'Connor's "Troy" and iiO's anthem, "Rapture." Most notable are the remixes of Kosheen's "Hide U" which won them remix of the year at the 2001 Muzik Awards, entered the UK Top 10 at number 6 and topped Billboard's Hot Dance Club Play chart; Sinéad O'Connor's "Troy" which topped Billboard's Hot Dance Music/Club Play chart; and iiO's "Rapture" which hit number 2 on both the UK singles chart and on the Billboard Hot Dance Music/Club Play chart. Creamer & K's original productions during this period include the lyrically sexual and provocative single "I Love You," featuring Oliver Twisted (a.k.a. Craig Mitchell) on vocals, the obscenity-laced "Fuck Sonnett," and the frequently licensed "Wish You Were Here."

== NY Love Records and recent work ==
In 2004, the duo created their own independent label for their voluminous output of original material, NY Love Records. The label was started in collaboration with another New York-based DJ/producer who they discovered and helped rise up the ranks, Lance Jordan. They began releasing dance singles through the label with a particular focus on developing singer/songwriters they were producing at the time. Among the most notable was Rosko, whose "Love Is A Drug" was another Billboard number one dance hit in America in 2005. They began collaborating more extensively with Rosko, and promoting their artists through a series of "NY Love Presents" parties, featuring live performances at the New York Super-Club Crobar, as well is in Miami at the Winter Music Conference.

Their 2006 single "Something To Lose" was signed to Ultra Records and is a duet between Nadia Ali of iiO and Rosko, who were introduced to each other by John Creamer. Championed on the UK's BBC Radio 1 by influential DJ and tastemaker Pete Tong, this new record was quickly licensed to Roger Sanchez's "Release Yourself vol. 5," as well as to the Global Underground solo debut of DJ/producer Sharam of the Grammy Award-winning duo Deep Dish, titled "Dubai."

Most recently, their label NY Love has been releasing new dance singles by the duo in 2007 including a dub remix of The Doors' "Forget The World" featuring Jim Morrison on vocals, "Hi Hats Are Your Friends," "The Healing" which is co-produced with Lance Jordan and features vocals by Susana, "Thirsty" which is co-produced with Joeski and again features Rosko on vocals, and the tribal "Mustachios" which is a collaboration between Creamer and Jordan.
