= Fine Print (song) =

Single by Nadia Ali

from the album Embers
- Released: July 1, 2009
- Genre: EDM
- Length: 5:30
- Label: Smile in Bed Records
- Songwriter: Nadia Ali
- Producers: Alex Sayz and Nick Wahlberg

Nadia Ali singles chronology
"Love Story" (2009)	"Fine Print" (2009)	"Fantasy" (2010)

"Fine Print" is a song by American singer-songwriter Nadia Ali. It was released on July 1, 2009 as the third single from Ali's debut solo album Embers by Smile in Bed Records.

== Track listing ==
No.	Title	Length
1.	"Fine Print (Radio Edit)"	3:56
2.	"Fine Print (Extended Mix/Album Version)"	5:28
3.	"Fine Print (Alex Sayz Radio Edit)"	3:54
4.	"Fine Print (Alex Sayz Remix)"	7:33
5.	"Fine Print (Alex Sayz Dub)"	7:33
6.	"Fine Print (Fritzy Alternate Fret Mix)"	4:23
7.	"Fine Print (Serge Devant Radio Edit)"	3:39
8.	"Fine Print (Serge Devant Remix)"	7:46
9.	"Fine Print (tyDi Radio Edit)"	4:11
10.	"Fine Print (tyDi Remix)"	8:43
11.	"Fine Print (Andy Harding Remix)"	5:53
12.	"Fine Print (Carl Tricks Remix)"	6:21

== Charts ==
Chart (2009)	Peak position
US Hot Dance Club Songs	4
