= IiO =

American dance music act

iiO

Background information
- Origin: New York City, New York, U.S.
- Genres: Dance, house, trance
- Years active: 2001–2011
- Label: Made
- Past members: Markus Moser; Nadia Ali (2001–05)

iiO (pronounced "eye-oh") was a New York City-based dance music act composed of singer and songwriter Nadia Ali and record producer Markus Moser. The group gained prominence for its 2001 single, "Rapture", which peaked at number two on the Billboard Hot Dance Club Play chart, and peaked within the top ten of the charts in the United Kingdom. Following the success of "Rapture", iiO released several singles and the studio album Poetica in 2005. The album reached number 17 on the Billboard Top Electronic Albums chart.

The same year, Ali left iiO to pursue a solo career. Meanwhile, Moser continued to release material featuring her on vocals, which included the 2006 single "Is It Love?" that reached number one on the Billboard Hot Dance Club Play chart. In 2011, he released the studio album Exit 110, which again featured Ali on vocals and was announced as the final project of the act.

== History ==
Nadia Ali was working in the New York offices of Versace, when a co-worker introduced her to record producer Markus Moser, who was looking for a female singer to collaborate on some of his productions for a girl group. The two teamed up and started a group that was originally named "Vaiio", named after the Sony Vaio laptop Ali used to write lyrics on. They later dropped the "va", on the advice of their label, to avoid causing problems in the future with Sony. Working with Moser, she wrote the lyrics and the vocals for the songs. Their first release was the 2001 single, "Rapture", a song Ali wrote in 30 minutes based on a relationship with an Australian man she met in a nightclub. "Rapture" peaked at number two on the Billboard Hot Dance Club Play chart. Outside of the United States, "Rapture" was a hit across Europe, most notably in the United Kingdom, where the song peaked at number two on the UK Singles Chart in November 2001. The song was remixed by prominent DJs and record producers including Avicii, Paul van Dyk, John Creamer & Stephane K, Armin van Buuren and Deep Dish.

"Rapture" was followed by "At the End" in 2002. The duo subsequently released "Smooth" in 2003, "Runaway" in 2004 and "Kiss You" in 2005. Their first studio album, Poetica, was released in 2005 by Made Records. The release of the album was timed with the dissolution of iiO with Ali leaving to pursue a solo career. Meanwhile, Moser continued to release material, featuring her on the vocals. These included the 2006 number one Billboard Hot Dance Club Play single, "Is It Love?", the 2007 remix album, Reconstruction Time: The Best of iiO Remixed, and the 2008 compilation album, Rapture Reconstruction: Platinum Edition.

In 2010, iiO re-emerged from hiatus when Moser released new remixes of "At the End". In April 2011, iiO's second studio album and final project, Exit 110, was released, featuring Ali on vocals. Speaking about the album, Ali explained that she had no involvement in it except her vocals and lyrics from nearly ten years ago being used for the project. She described it as "interesting" that there was new work featuring her being released by iiO when she had neither worked with or been in contact with Moser since she left iiO and was completely focused on her solo career. When asked further if the dissolution of the duo was amicable, she refused to comment further. Moser, on the other hand, said he decided to use material Ali had recorded before she left iiO to release a new album due to a demand by fans.

== Discography ==
=== Studio albums ===
- Poetica (2005) – Top Electronic Albums number 17
- Exit 110 (2011)

=== Remix albums ===
- Reconstruction Time: The Best of iiO Remixed (2007)
- American Ambient (2011)

=== Compilations ===
- Rapture Reconstruction: Platinum Edition (2008)
- Frank Bailey vs iiO Remastered (2011)

=== Singles ===
Year	Title	Peak chart positions						Album
Year	Title	US	US Dance	AUS	DEN	FIN	UK	Album
2001	"Rapture"	46	2	3	10	12	2	Poetica
2002	"At the End"	—	41	53	16	13	20	Poetica
2003	"Smooth"	—	—	—	—	2	—	Poetica
2004	"Runaway"	—	—	—	—	4	—	Poetica
2005	"Kiss You"	—	3	—	—	5	—	Poetica
2006	"Is It Love?"	—	1	—	—	20	—	Poetica
2007	"Rapture 2007"	—	3	—	—	—	—	Reconstruction Time
2010	"At the End" (Metropolitan Mix)	—	—	—	—	—	—	Non-album single
2011	"It'll Be Like"	—	—	—	—	—	—	Exit 110
