= Crash and Burn (Nadia Ali song) =

Single by Nadia Ali

from the album Embers
- Released: June 17, 2008
- Genre: EDM
- Length: 4:11
- Label: Smile in Bed Records
- Songwriter: Nadia Ali
- Producers: Nadia Ali, Scott 'Fritzy' Fritz

Nadia Ali singles chronology
"Crash and Burn" (2008)	"Love Story" (2009)

Audio sample
- "Crash and Burn": file; help

"Crash and Burn" is the debut solo single by American singer Nadia Ali, released on June 17, 2008 by Smile in Bed Records. It is from her debut solo album, Embers. The single reached the top 10 of Billboard's Hot Dance Club Play Chart.

== Track listing ==
No.	Title	Length
1.	"Crash and Burn (Radio Edit)"	4:11
2.	"Crash and Burn (Dean Coleman Smash Vocal Remix)"	9:31
3.	"Crash and Burn (DJ Shah Magic Island Remix)"	8:07
4.	"Crash and Burn (Sultan and Ned Shepard Remix)"	9:35
5.	"Crash and Burn (Justin Thomas 'In the Flesh' Remix)"	7:58
6.	"Crash and Burn (Kered & Kiraly Remix)"	8:01
7.	"Crash and Burn (Astro & Glyde Remix)"	9:22
8.	"Crash and Burn (Dilamani & Rassek Remix)"	8:48
9.	"Crash and Burn (Justin Thomas 'In the Spirit' Mix)"	3:54

== Charts ==
Chart (2008)	Peak position
US Hot Dance Club Songs	6
