= Love Story (Nadia Ali song) =

Single by Nadia Ali

from the album Embers
- Released: March 10, 2009
- Genre: EDM
- Length: 4:06
- Label: Smile in Bed Records
- Songwriter: Nadia Ali
- Producers: Nadia Ali, Ossama Al Sarraf and Ned Shepard

Nadia Ali singles chronology
"Crash and Burn" (2009)	"Love Story" (2009)	"Fine Print" (2009)

Love Story: Les Remixes Noirs

Music video
- "Love Story" on YouTube

"Love Story" is a song by American singer-songwriter Nadia Ali. It was released on March 10, 2009, as the second single from Ali's debut solo album, Embers, by Smile in Bed Records.

== Track listing ==
=== Love Story: Remixes ===
No.	Title	Length
1.	"Love Story"	4:06
2.	"Love Story (Starkillers Radio Edit)"	4:17
3.	"Love Story (Starkillers Remix)"	8:33
4.	"Love Story (Sultan and Ned Shepard Radio Edit)"	3:29
5.	"Love Story (Sultan and Ned Shepard Remix)"	9:12
6.	"Love Story (Andy Moor's Radio Edit)"	3:34
7.	"Love Story (Andy Moor's Vocal Mix)"	8:55
8.	"Love Story (Andy Moor's Dub Mix)"	8:10
9.	"Love Story (Andy Moor's EcoDub Mix)"	8:52

=== Love Story: Les Remixes Noirs ===
No.	Title	Length
1.	"Love Story (Scumfrog Radio Edit)"	3:54
2.	"Love Story (Scumfrog Vocal Remix)"	6:06
3.	"Love Story (Scumfrog Extended Vocal Remix)"	9:06
4.	"Love Story (Scumfrog Dub)"	7:37
5.	"Love Story (Dresden & Johnston Radio Edit)"	4:07
6.	"Love Story (Dresden & Johnston Vocal Remix)"	8:43
7.	"Love Story (Dresden & Johnston Dub)"	5:56
8.	"Love Story (Victor Franco Radio Edit)"	3:56
9.	"Love Story (Victor Franco Remix)"	6:29
10.	"Love Story (Victor Franco Dub)"	7:32
11.	"Love Story (Fritzy & Stylez Remix)"	6:12
12.	"Love Story (Fritzy & Stylez Extended Remix)"	7:14

== Awards and nominations ==
- 2010 International Dance Music Awards at Winter Music Conference
  - Best Progressive/Tech House Track, Love Story (Nominated)

== Charts ==
=== Weekly charts ===
Chart (2009)	Peak position
US Dance Club Songs (Billboard)	1

=== Year-end charts ===
Chart (2009)	Position
US Dance Club Songs (Billboard)	44
