= Mikael Johnston =

American musical artist

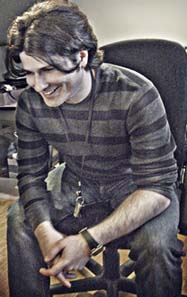
- Johnston in 2023

Background information
- Born: Mikael Wesley Mathew Johnston; December 29, 1968 (age 57); Dover, Delaware
- Origin: San Francisco
- Genres: Electronica, house, dance-pop, trance, rock, hip hop
- Occupations: Musician, producer, audio recording, mix and re-recording engineer
- Instruments: Guitar, bass, synthesizers, drums, vocals
- Years active: 1994–present
- Labels: Mephisto Records, City of Angels Records, Warner Bros. Records
- Member of: Mephisto Odyssey
- Website: Pop Twist Studios

Mikael Johnston is a musician, producer and remixer who got his start in the industry in electronic dance music.

== Early work ==
Johnston is a founding member of the San Francisco electronica music group Mephisto Odyssey, which originated in the early 1990s. Following the release of several singles, including "Dream of The Black Dahlia" on his label, Mephisto Records, Johnston signed with progressive West Coast label City of Angels, home to The Crystal Method.

== The Warner Bros. Records years ==
On December 23, 1998, Johnston's band Mephisto Odyssey signed a six-record, 6 million dollar deal with Warner Bros. Records. During his tenure at the label, besides work on his own albums, Johnston also collaborated with other label artists including Jane's Addiction on a series of remixes for their maxi single "So What." Other collaborations include remixes for Soul Coughing's "Rolling (song)," Los Amigos Invisibles' "Mi Linda," and Joe Rogan's "VooDoo Punanny."

Johnston also worked with industrial metal act Static-X on various remixes for their album "Wisconsin Death Trip (album)" for their single, "Push It (Static-X song)," as well as "Love Dump," which Mephisto Odyssey's remix appeared in the soundtrack for the film Valentine (movie) directed by Jamie Blanks; along with several songs off of their album "Machine (Static-X album)," including "Cold (Static-X song)," "Black and White (Static-X song)," and "This Is Not."

This work eventually led to the collaboration of Mikael Johnston, Wayne Static and Koichi Fukuda on the song "Crash," which combined industrial metal and electronica elements. This song was used for the soundtrack of the film Batman Beyond: Return of the Joker with a video for the song directed by Len Wiseman that appeared on MTV. The video also was included on the DVD and Blu-ray release of the movie.

Mephisto Odyssey's first official band release on the label was an EP called "The Lift." The title song, "The Lift," hit the Billboard Magazine Hot Dance Club Play Chart, peaking at #43.

On their debut full-length release, "The Deep Red Connection," the song "Some Kinda Freak," written by Johnston, is prominently featured in the Amsterdam club scene in the horror film Hostel (2005 film) directed by Eli Roth and produced by Quentin Tarantino. The song was chosen for the film by Roth and Tarantino because they liked that it used a sample from an obscure horror film called "Ganja & Hess" as the chorus hook "Everybody's Some Kinda Freak..." Mephisto Odyssey also contributed songs from their debut album including "Jump" and "Some Kinda Freak" to the soundtrack for the Xbox game, Mad Dash Racing.

== Post Warner Bros. Records ==
After leaving Warner Bros. in 2002, Johnston mixed the album "The Cover Up" by I Am the World Trade Center while briefly living in Athens, Georgia (2002-2005).

In 2005, Johnston moved back to the Bay Area, where he grew up. Shortly thereafter, he started work on the shared EP "Takeover Records 3-Way Issue No. 2," producing, engineering and mixing the contributions from the Epitaph Records band The Matches. The songs that Johnston worked on included "A Girl I Know," "Sick Little Suicide (acoustic)" and "Shoot Me In The Smile (acoustic)."

Also in 2005, Johnston began collaborating extensively with producer Jeff Saltzman (known for producing The Killers' "Hot Fuss"). Johnston's work for Saltzman spanned 8 years and included: co-engineering for The Sounds' "Dying to Say This to You;" assistant engineering for Smashmouth's "Summer Girl;" co-producing, recording, engineering, and mixing Sleep Party People's "Floating," while also writing and playing guitar on the track "Floating Blood of Mine;" recording and mixing for Blondie's "Blondie 4(0) Ever" as well as cowriting the song "I Screwed Up"(featuring Los Rakas)."

== Dresden and Johnston ==
Johnston is one half of the electronic dance music duo Dresden and Johnston, founded 2009, with Dave Dresden of Gabriel and Dresden. Dresden and Johnston's remixes of Lily Allen ("The Fear") and Nadia Ali (Love Story (Nadia Ali song)) both hit #1 in the Billboard Magazine Hot Dance Club Play Chart in 2009. Other remixes by the duo include "The Unbreakable" by BT, "Better Man" by JD Webb, "Black Rainbows" by The Crystal Method and "Hello Seattle" by Owl City. Dresden and Johnston's own single, "Keep Faith," featuring a remix by Morgan Page, also hit the Hot Dance Club Play Chart, peaking at #10.

== Current work ==
Johnston was the rerecording mixer and dialogue editor for the film "Butchers Bluff" in 2024.

In 2026, a new release for "Crash" is planned on Pop Twist Records. The single will feature a 4K re-edited version of the original video and a new mix and master of the original song. Marking its 25th anniversary, a new version of the song, "Crash Reborn"—which includes a revised chord progression (written by Johnston) and features guitars by Brad Gillis and vocals by Wayne Static with a video co-directed by Len Wiseman and William Instone—was released on New Years Eve 2025.

On April 1, 2026, "CRASH: Reborn” surpassed 1 million organic views on YouTube.

In 1999, Johnston collaborated with Wayne Static on the "Crucified Dub" version of Static-X's "Push It" for the song's maxi-single release. The single was certified Gold by the Recording Industry Association of America (RIAA) on April 21, 2026. Johnston received a Gold plaque from Warner Music for his contributions to the single.

In May 2026, Johnston stated that Edsel Dope had attempted to prevent the release of "CRASH: Reborn".

Publication	Chart	Album / Song	Artist	Chart #	Credit
Billboard	UK Albums Chart	Ghosts Of Download	Blondie	16	Writer, Mixer
Billboard	Independent Albums	Ghosts Of Download	Blondie	21	Writer, Mixer
Billboard	Alternative Albums	Ghosts Of Download	Blondie	22	Writer, Mixer
Billboard	US Top Rock	Ghosts Of Download	Blondie	30	Writer, Mixer
Billboard	Top 200	Ghosts Of Download	Blondie	109	Writer, Mixer
Billboard	Hot Dance Club Play	Tonight (Dresden & Johnston Remix)	Enrique Iglesias	1	Remixer
Billboard	Hot Dance Club Play	Keep Faith	Dresden & Johnston	10	Writer, Producer, Engineer
Billboard	Hot Dance Club Play	Love Story	Nadia Ali	1	Remixer
Billboard	Hot Dance Club Play	The Fear (Dresden & Johnston Remix)	Lily Allen	1	Remixer
Billboard	Adult Top 40	So Insane	Smash Mouth	25	Assistant Engineer
Rolling Stone	Top 100 Songs	Tony The Beat	The Sounds	43	Engineer
Billboard	Independent Albums	Dying To Say This To You	The Sounds	9	Engineer
Billboard	Heat Seekers	Dying To Say This To You	The Sounds	1	Engineer
Billboard	Top 200	Dying To Say This To You	The Sounds	107	Engineer
Billboard	Top 200	Beneath Between Beyond	Static-X	139	Writer, Producer, Engineer
Billboard	Hot Dance Breakout	Sexy Dancer	Mephisto Odyssey	2	Writer, Producer, Engineer
Billboard	Hot Dance Club Play	The Lift	Mephisto Odyssey	43	Writer, Producer, Mixer
Billboard	Maxi-Single	Push-It	Static-X	5	Remixer
Billboard	Hot Dance Breakout	The Lift	Mephisto Odyssey	3	Writer, Producer, Mixer
Billboard	Maxi-Single	So What!	Jane's Addiction	30	Producer, Remixer
