= Dresden & Johnston =

American DJ

Dresden and Johnston
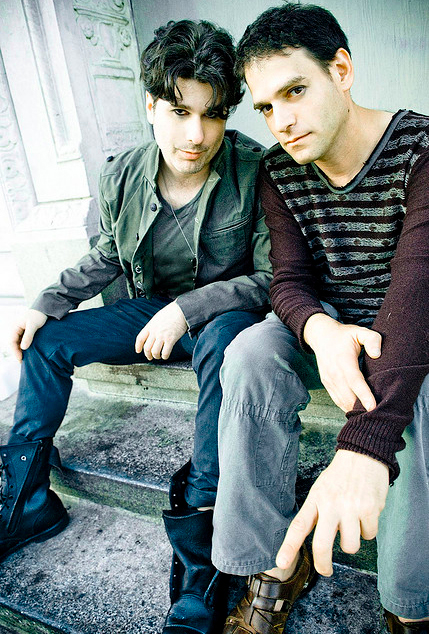
- Mikael Johnston (left) and Dave Dresden (right)

Background information
- Origin: San Francisco, California, US
- Genres: Electronic dance music, trance, house
- Occupations: DJ, record producer, remixer
- Years active: 2008–present
- Label: Problem Child
- Members: Dave Dresden; Mikael Johnston
- Website: dresdenandjohnston.com

Dresden & Johnston are an American DJ and production duo composed of Dave Dresden of Gabriel & Dresden and Mikael Johnston of Mephisto Odyssey.

== History ==
Dave Dresden is the co-founder of the dance music acts Gabriel & Dresden and Motorcycle, remixer for acts like Jewel and The Killers, and the co-author of the dance floor hits As the Rush Comes, and Tracking Treasure Down. Mikael Johnston is the founding member of the Warner Bros. Records act Mephisto Odyssey who were pivotal in defining the nascent San Francisco house sound. Johnston has also collaborated remixed and engineered for artists such as Jane’s Addiction, Static-X, Los Amigos Invisibles, Soul Coughing, I Am the World Trade Center, Smash Mouth, The Matches, The Sounds and Goapele.

Johnston and Dresden had known each other for over a decade and started collaborating once Gabriel & Dresden had disbanded. The partnership was announced in February 2009 on Beatport. Their first work together were remixes of Lily Allen's song "The Fear" followed by Nadia Ali's "Love Story", both topped Billboard's Hot Dance Club Play Chart. This was followed by remixes for BT, JD Webb, The Crystal Method, Owl City, Morgan Page, Enrique Iglesias and Dev. Their remix of Enrique Iglesias' "Tonight (I'm Lovin' You)" reached number one on Billboard Hot Dance Club Play Chart.

Their first original production was "Keep Faith" featuring vocals by Mezo Riccio. Released in March 2010, the song charted at number 10 on Billboard Hot Dance Club Play Chart. Around the same time, remixes of their collaboration "That Day" with singer-songwriter Nadia Ali were released on compilation albums. In August 2010, the duo released their EP titled "The Cove/Redhead" and in November 2010 their second single "Metaphonix". Their first studio album tentatively titled High and Low is rumored for a 2011 release. The album contains collaborations with Morgan Page, Jan Burton, Skylar Grey, Nadia Ali, Mezo Riccio and David Penner of Andain.

== Discography ==
Singles/EPs

- 2010 "Keep Faith" (featuring Mezo Riccio)
- 2010 "The Cove/Redhead"
- 2010 "Metaphonix"

Compilations

- 2010 Armin van Buuren - ASOT Radio Top 15 - "That Day" (Tritonal Remix) [feat. Nadia Ali and Mikael Johnston]
- 2010 Myon & Shane 54 - International Departures Soundtracks - "That Day" (Myon & Shane 54 Remix) [feat. Nadia Ali and Mikael Johnston]
- 2010 Menno De Jong - Intuition Sessions: Rio de Janeiro - "That Day" (Lenny Ruckus & Ana Vida Remix) [feat. Nadia Ali and Mikael Johnston]
- 2010 Nadia Ali - Queen of Clubs Trilogy: Onyx Edition - "That Day" (Tritonal Remix) [feat. Nadia Ali and Mikael Johnston]
- 2011 Sydney Blu - Nervous Nightlife: Live at Mansion - "That Day" (Sydney Blu Remix) [feat. Nadia Ali and Mikael Johnston]

Remixes

- 2009 Lily Allen - "The Fear"
- 2009 Nadia Ali - "Love Story"
- 2009 JD Web - "Better Man"
- 2009 BT - "Unbreakable"
- 2010 The Crystal Method - "Black Rainbows"
- 2010 Filo & Peri - "Soul and the Sun"
- 2010 Morgan Page - "I've Had Friends"
- 2011 Enrique Iglesias - "Tonight (I'm Loving You)"
- 2011 Dev feat. Cataracs - "Bass Down Low"
