= Disconnect (Jes album) =

Studio album by JES
- Released: April 7, 2007
- Genre: Pop, trance, electronic, alternative rock
- Label: Magik Muzik; Black Hole Recordings; Ultra Records
- Producer: Jes Brieden, Carmen Rizzo

JES chronology
Disconnect (2007)	Into the Dawn (The Hits Disconnected) (2008)

Singles from Disconnect
- 1. "Ghost" Released: November 27, 2007; 2. "Heaven" Released: December 18, 2007; 3. "Imagination" Released: 2008

Disconnect is the debut studio album by American musician Jes, and was released on April 7, 2007. A remix album, Into the Dawn (The Hits Disconnected) was released the next year, featuring remixes for songs on Disconnect, along with several new songs.

== Track listing ==
No.	Title	Length
1.	"Ghost" (with Deepsky)	4:09
2.	"Heaven"	4:28
3.	"One Moon Circling"	3:50
4.	"Want My Love"	4:00
5.	"You and Me Belong"	5:04
6.	"In Ohm"	4:16
7.	"Like a Waterfall"	3:47
8.	"Imagination"	5:16
9.	"Disconnect"	4:22
10.	"People Will Go"	4:39
11.	"Around You"	4:52
12.	"Stronger"	3:37
13.	"My Blue Heart"	4:02
14.	"See You Soon"	2:35

iTunes bonus track
No.	Title	Length
15.	"Everything (acoustic version)" (with Tiësto)	3:32

=== Into the Dawn (The Hits Disconnected) ===
Into the Dawn (The Hits Disconnected)

Remix album by JES
- Released: 2008
- Genre: Pop, trance, electronic, alternative rock
- Label: Magik Muzik; Black Hole Recordings; Ultra Records
- Producer: Jes Brieden

JES chronology
Disconnect (2007)	Into the Dawn (The Hits Disconnected) (2008)	High Glow (2010)

No.	Title	Length
1.	"Heaven (Mÿon Remix)"	6:02
2.	"Around You (Jukibe Remix)"	4:23
3.	"It's You I Need"	4:29
4.	"Like a Waterfall (Flipside Ambient Remix)"	6:03
5.	"Into the Dawn"	4:30
6.	"Imagination (Richard Robson Remix)"	4:06
7.	"Blind"	4:33
8.	"Wish You Were Here"	4:09
9.	"In Ohm (Lime Chill Remix)"	4:20
10.	"Breakin Me"	3:34
11.	"Ghost (Lime Chill Remix)"	4:33
12.	"As the Rush Comes (Hamptons Chills Remix)"	4:58
