= Imagination (Jes song) =

Single by Jes

from the album Disconnect
- Released: 2008
- Recorded: 2007
- Genre: Electronic dance, progressive trance, house
- Label: Ultra Records (US); Magik Muzik (Netherlands)
- Songwriters: Jes Brieden, Josh Gabriel, Dave Dresden
- Producers: Jes Brieden, Richard Robson

"Imagination" is a 2008 song by American musician Jes, who co-wrote the track with her partners from Motorcycle, Josh Gabriel and Dave Dresden and co-produced it with Richard Robson. The track is featured on her 2007 debut studio album Disconnect and a chill-out version is on her 2008 compilation album Into the Dawn (The Hits Disconnected).

The track itself is a newly recorded version of an original that was recorded in 2004 as a Motorcycle single when Brieden was still a member. It has also been featured as a track on Tiësto's In Search of Sunrise 6 mixed compilation set, and in an acoustic version on Gabriel & Dresden's album Bloom.

"Imagination" reached number 1 on Billboard Dance Radio Airplay in January 2009.

In 2019, Will Atkinson remixed Imagination. The track was released via Magik Muzik (Black Hole Recordings).

== CD, Maxi Singles ==
Magik Muzik Maxi-single

1. Imagination (Tiësto Radio Edit) - 3:45
2. Imagination (Tiësto Remix) - 7:23
3. Imagination (Kaskade Radio Edit) - 3:46
4. Imagination (Kaskade Club Remix) - 6:35
5. Imagination (Michael Moog Remix) - 7:37
6. Imagination (Piano Vocal Ballad) - 3:31

Ultra Records LP Cut

- Imagination (Richard Robson Remix)

== Chart positions ==
- Hot Dance Airplay: #1

== See also ==
- List of number-one dance airplay hits of 2009 (U.S.)
