= IAWTC =

IAWTC can refer to:

- An abbreviated form of "I agree with this comment", used in Internet slang
- I Am the World Trade Center, a synthpop duo
