= Gabriel & Dresden =

American music duo formed 2001

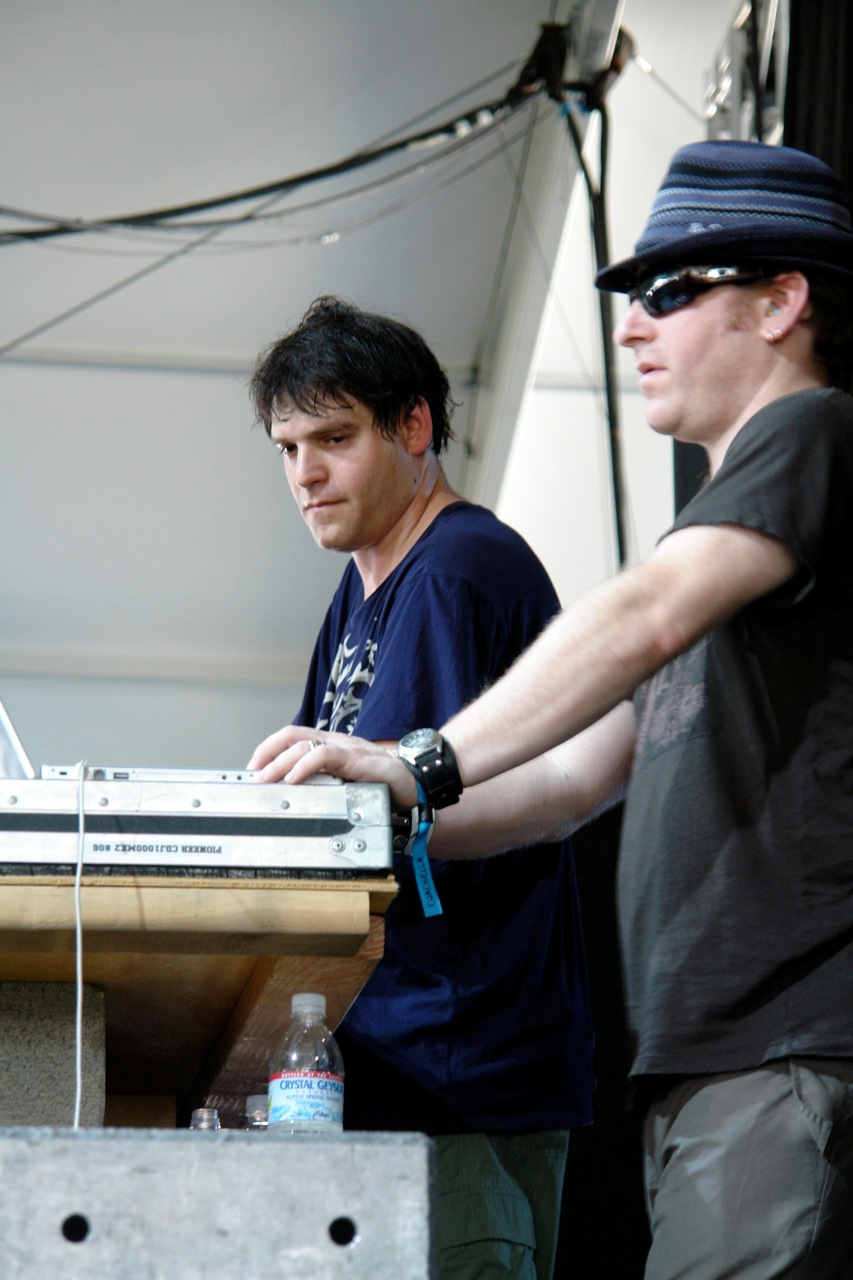
- Gabriel & Dresden performing at Coachella Festival on April 30, 2006

Background information
- Origin: San Francisco, California, U.S.
- Genres: Progressive trance; electronic; house
- Years active: 2001–2008, 2011–present
- Labels: Organized Nature; Armada; Anjunabeats
- Members: Josh Gabriel; Dave Dresden

Gabriel & Dresden is an American electronic music duo comprising Josh Gabriel and Dave Dresden, formed in San Francisco, California. They collaborated from 2001 to 2008, then again from 2011 to the present. During that time, they have created numerous hit songs and remixes, some of which are considered classics. They won the coveted Winter Music Conference IDMA award for "Best American DJ" twice, in 2007 and 2008, the latter time on the same day that the group split up. The pair reunited in early 2011 and proceeded on a reunion tour, which began at Ruby Skye in San Francisco on March 4, 2011. They produced three studio albums together: self-titled album (2006), The Only Road (2017) which was released after an 11-year hiatus period, and Remedy (2020).

== History ==
=== Early years (1980–2002) ===
==== Dresden ====
Dave Dresden's musical ability was developed through 15 years DJing prior to forming the group, while Josh Gabriel has an undergraduate college degree in music composition from the California Institute of the Arts.

Dave's love for music was influenced by a local 1980's Westchester County, New York nightclub located in Banksville, New York called Krypton's. DJ Ralphie Gomez, the club's longtime resident DJ (1980–1994), played an eclectic mixture of new wave and early industrial music that drew crowds to this popular back road rural night spot. He also was inspired by watching a pre-fame Moby DJ at a teen club in Greenwich, Connecticut, called The Cafe. One night while dancing at Krypton's to Anne Clark's "Wallies", Dave decided to be a DJ.

Dave's first gig was at Marty & Lenny's, a nightclub in New Rochelle, NY where the owners of the then predominantly freestyle music venue promoted a new music night. The night was promoted by Long Island's 92.7 WDRE, and Dave's eponymous DJ name "Dave the Wave" started to earn him recognition amongst fans of new wave, alternative and industrial dance music. From there, he landed a long-standing residency at BAR in New Haven, CT which lasted for over ten years. This helped him to land a spot reporting his top tracks to the Hot Dance Club Songs chart in Billboard, a highly touted, and difficult title to earn amongst DJs in the US with only 95 DJs in total submitting their weekly charts. Dave also worked in many other facets of the music industry including radio, A&R, journalism and club promotions.

==== Gabriel ====
Josh started experimenting with synthesizers and computers in the early 1980s, achieving mastery of the Yamaha DX7 and TX816 by the age of 17. With an Apple Macintosh Plus, and the earliest of music applications like Mark of the Unicorn's "Composer" and "Performer", Josh was already on the bleeding edge. In the Netherlands, Gabriel's inventor spirit took shape as he wrote a computer application to control samples on an Akai S900 in real-time with a joystick. With this, the inception for what later became Mixman was born. Along with electronics whiz Jan Panis, (Karlheinz Stockhausen's tech-man) Gabriel built an apparatus which converted beams of light coming up off the floor into a MIDI control device and the 20-year-old Gabriel dressed in black, wearing white gloves performed his real-time beat-trigger device in the clubs of Amsterdam. Josh attended the Institute of Sonology in the Netherlands and earned his degree from California Institute of the Arts in Los Angeles. He founded the music creation tool Mixman in the 1990s, which was the first program to make music using loops of digital audio. Gabriel's patents for loop-based music remixing are the backbone of industry standard music making software applications used in virtually every producer's studio today.

==== Dresden met Gabriel ====
Dave met Pete Tong whilst he was the music director of Swedish Egil's grooveradio.com in 2000. By 2001 Dave was working for Pete as a scout looking for new music for his radio show Essential Selection and label FFRR. At the Miami Winter Music Conference in March 2001 Dave struck up a conversation with Josh at a party being hosted by grooveradio.com after seeing Josh hand DJ Leon Alexander a copy of his first vinyl record called "Wave 3". Dave liked the track so much gave it to Pete who immediately played it the next week on the Essential Selection and also used it for his compilation Twisted Beats. A few months later, as a thank you for the work he had done, Pete offered Dave the opportunity to do a remix of New Order's Someone Like You and Dave asked Josh to work on it with him.

Dave and Josh officially joined forces later in 2001 and quickly made a name for themselves by creating numerous remixes for artists as diverse as Tiësto, Paul Oakenfold, Sarah McLachlan, Way Out West, Annie Lennox, Duncan Sheik, and Jewel. In 2002 Gabriel & Dresden released "Lament" on Satoshi Tomiie's Saw Recordings imprint, their first single. The first Gabriel & Dresden gig was Arc in New York City.

=== Rise to fame (2003–2008) ===
In 2004 they released their first mix CD, Bloom, after having their seventh #1 Billboard Dance Chart Hit with the Madonna & Britney Spears collaboration "Me Against the Music". They worked on their own group Motorcycle with JES, resulting in their signature song "As the Rush Comes", which reached #11 on the UK singles charts. Their remix of Josh's side project Andain's "Beautiful Things" also became a club and radio anthem around the world. They entered the prestigious DJ Magazine Top 100 DJ's poll in 2003 at #43. They steadily climbed the Top 100 chart in the following years, placing at 40 in 2004, 33 in 2005, and peaking at 20 in 2006. Also in 2005, they released "Without You Near" in cooperation with Markus Schulz and Departure as well as "Zocalo" with Armin Van Buuren, which was featured on his album Shivers.

Their remix for Above & Beyond's "No One on Earth" was voted the #1 track of the year for 2004 on Armin Van Buuren's A State of Trance radio show.

"We make music with lyrics and choruses, music that is emotive with melodies and meaning."

— Josh Gabriel.

"We make songs that make you feel good about feeling bad."

— Dave Dresden.

In 2005 Gabriel & Dresden started their own label, Organized Nature, which was intended mainly to release their own material. Their first release on the label was the song "Arcadia" which gained immediate favor with DJs such as Tiësto and Armin Van Buuren. Josh and Dave spent most of 2005 in the studio recording their eponymous debut album, Gabriel & Dresden, featuring vocals from Molly Bancroft and Jan Burton. The album was released in June 2006 and had two hits, "Tracking Treasure Down" and "Dangerous Power", which both topped the Billboard Hot Dance Club Songs charts. "Dangerous Power" also won an WMC IDMA Award for "Best Alternative / Dance Single" in 2007.

In 2007 they released the highly regarded Toolroom Knights compilation on Mark Knight's label Toolroom Records, which featured their exclusive remix of The Killers' "Read My Mind".

=== Breakup ===

The duo finished their last tour with two appearances at the Winter Music Conference 2008 in Miami. They played a 5+ hour set at the Pawn Shop on March 28, 2008, and a closing 1 hour set at the Beatport/Remix Hotel Pool Party at the National Hotel on March 30, 2008.

Yes, the rumor is true. Gabriel & Dresden have parted ways for the time being. Over the past year, Josh and I have been moving apart as artists and we decided rather than milk it and be moderately happy together that we separate and examine ourselves as individual artists for a while. Our final date was the beatport pool party in Miami on March 30. For those who were there, I want to thank each and every one of you for showing Josh and I the love and support that you did. A lot of the set was songs that we have individually been working on interspersed with a few fan favorites. I will remember that hour and fifteen minutes forever because I certainly felt the love with all the hands in the air and the well-wishes.

— Dave Dresden

=== Solo years (2008–2010) ===
In December 2008, Dresden teamed up with longtime friend and Mephisto Odyssey founder Mikael Johnston to remix Lily Allen's "The Fear" under the new moniker Dresden and Johnston. The new production duo went on to remix a number of artists including Nadia Ali's "Love Story" and Enrique Iglesias's "Tonight (I'm Fuckin' You)", all of which hit the #1 position in the Billboard Hot Club Play Dance Chart. Dresden and Johnston's first original single, "Keep Faith" featuring Mezo Riccio, followed in early 2010 and went to #10 in the Billboard Hot Dance Club Songs chart and top 5 on Sirius radio's BPM and Club Phusion. The single featured remixes by fellow producers Morgan Page and Harry Romero. A full-length album by the duo featuring guest vocalists Nadia Ali, Jan Burton and Skylar Grey was planned but has yet to be released.

Josh spent his time off from Gabriel & Dresden starting a label called Different Pieces (via Armada Music) and working on three different album projects. The first was his 2008 solo album Eight. He also worked on an album project for Winter Kills, Josh's band project with vocalist Meredith Call. This yielded the song "Deep Down" which charted on the Billboard Hot Dance Club Songs chart and was on Armin Van Buuren's A State of Trance 2009 year-end compilation. He also produced the debut album for Andain, You Once Told Me which finally saw a release in 2012 and spawned a sizable hit with the song "Promises", which Gabriel & Dresden remixed in 2011.

=== Reunion (2011–present) ===
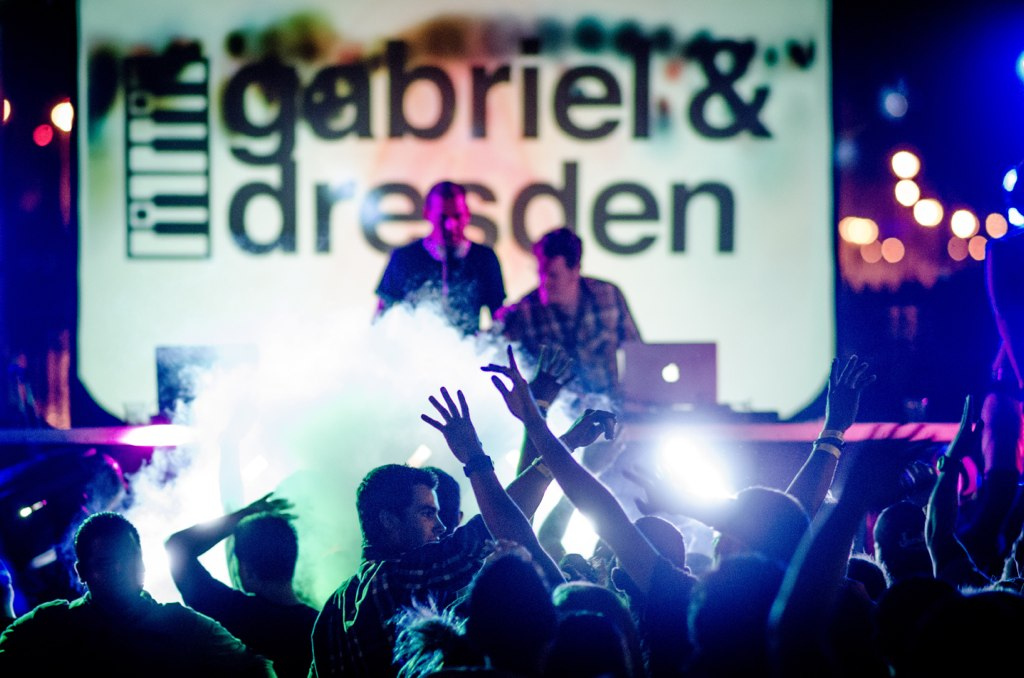
Gabriel & Dresden at Aloha Tower in Honolulu, Hawaii. December 9, 2012

On December 31, 2010, Gabriel & Dresden reunited for special one off New Year's Eve celebration alongside ATB and Francis Preve at the Hollywood Palladium in Los Angeles.

Shortly afterward, the duo were booked on the Anjunabeats WMC Miami party at the Ice Palace as a special guest. Since this event, Gabriel & Dresden have officially announced themselves as reunited.

Since the reunion, Gabriel & Dresden have performed at many clubs and festivals around the world including Electric Daisy Carnival (Las Vegas, Dallas, Chicago & Orlando), Tomorrowland in Belgium, Electric Zoo Festival in New York, Sunburn Festival in India, Escape From Wonderland, Nocturnal Wonderland, Paradiso Festival, Creamfields Australia, ASOT 550: Invasion, Ministry of Sound, London, Zouk and a monthly residency at the Marquee Las Vegas in Las Vegas.

In 2011, they signed an artist deal with Armada Music which brought forth their mix compilation Mixed for Feet, Volume 1 as well as numerous singles including 2012'a "Play It Back" featuring Betsie Larkin, "Tomorrow Comes" with Neil Ormandy (2013), "Shatter" (with D-Wayne) and a re-working of "Tracking Treasure Down Revisited".

On February 3, 2014, they restarted their monthly radio show "Gabriel & Dresden present Organized Nature" on Digitally Imported's progressive channel. Since this show was already on the air in the past, it began this time around with Episode 30.

On March 29, 2014, they released "Rise Up" which was supported by a wide variety of DJs including Above & Beyond, Eric Prydz, Armin Van Buuren, Markus Schulz and Jason Bentley. The official music video for this song was generated entirely from Creative Commons License content found on the video sharing website Vimeo.

On November 21, 2016, the duo launched a Kickstarter campaign to fund a new album. The project was almost completely funded within the first day, receiving over $25,000 out of the $30,000 they requested. They went on to crowd fund $73,000 to record their album through this Kickstarter

On September 16, 2017, it was announced on Above & Beyond's ABGT 250 show live from The Gorge, that Gabriel & Dresden had signed the new album The Only Road to their label Anjunabeats. Above & Beyond also played two songs from the album, "This Love Kills Me" and "White Walls" in their set. "This Love Kills Me" was subsequently released on Oct 6th, 2017 on Anjunabeats. "Waiting for Winter" and "White Walls" were released on November 7, 2017, as part of the Waiting for Winter / White Walls EP. The album was released on December 15, 2017.

On October 4, 2018, Gabriel & Dresden announced another Kickstarter campaign to create their third album "Remedy." This time they are asking for 100,000US so they can take 6 months off the road to write and produce it. The resulting album is planned to be released on Anjunabeats

On December 7, 2018, Gabriel & Dresden were nominated for a Best Remixed Recording Grammy Award for the Cosmic Gate remix of their song "Only Road" featuring Sub Teal.

On November 1, 2019, Anjunabeats announced the release date of their third album Remedy. It was released on January 17, 2020, with a full tour supporting the album. Three singles were released: "Coming On Strong", "Keep On Holding" and "Something Bigger".

On March 19, 2020, Gabriel & Dresden started live streaming on Twitch. The broadcast first started on Facebook but when they were kicked off for playing 3 songs that went against Facebook's DMCA policy, they switched over to Twitch and have been regularly live streaming their show Club Quarantine 3 or more times per week. They have since become one of the most viewed music channels on the platform during this time.

== Discography ==
=== Studio albums ===
- Gabriel & Dresden (2006)
- The Only Road (2017)
- Remedy (2020)

=== Compilation albums ===
- Bloom (2004)
- Sensation (2007)
- Toolroom Knights, Vol. 2 (2007)
- Mixed for Feet, Vol. 1 (2011)
- In Search of Sunrise 14 (with Markus Schulz and Andy Moor) (2018)

=== Soundtrack albums ===
- Nip/Tuck: Original TV Soundtrack (2003) (mixed by)

=== Singles and extended plays ===
This list contains singles by Gabriel & Dresden, aliases and co-productions.

- 2002 "Lament"
- 2003 "As the Rush Comes" (as Motorcycle with Jes Brieden) (#11 UK)
- 2004 "Arcadia" (#6 Finland)
- 2005 "Portobello / Serendipity"
- 2005 "Sub / Tidal" (as Bigtop with Pete Houser)
- 2005 "Dub Horizon"
- 2005 "Zocalo" (with Armin van Buuren)
- 2006 "Tracking Treasure Down" (#1 Hot Dance Club Play, #8 Hot Dance Airplay, and #6 Finland)
- 2006 "Without You Near" (with Markus Schulz)
- 2006 "Mass Repeat / Eleven" (with Scarlett Etienne)
- 2006 "Dangerous Power" (#1 Hot Dance Club Play and #4 Hot Dance Airplay)
- 2012 "Servo vs Colossus" (with Francis Preve)
- 2012 "No Reservations"
- 2012 "Play It Back" (featuring Betsie Larkin)
- 2013 "Shatter with D-Wayne"
- 2013 "Tracking Treasure Down Revisited"
- 2013 "Tomorrow Comes" (featuring Neil Ormandy)
- 2014 "Rise Up"
- 2014 "New Ground"
- 2017 "This Love Kills Me" (featuring Sub Teal) [Gabriel & Dresden Club Mix - Above & Beyond Respray]
- 2017 "Waiting For Winter / White Walls"
- 2017 "You" (featuring Jan Burton)
- 2019 "Coming on Strong" (featuring Sub Teal)
- 2019 "Keep on Holding" (featuring Jan Burton)
- 2020 "Something Bigger" (featuring Sub Teal)

Other songs

- 2004 "Deep, Breath, Love" (as Motorcycle with Jes Brieden)
- 2004 "Imagination" (as Motorcycle with Jes Brieden)
- 2004 "Around You" (as Motorcycle with Jes Brieden)

=== Remixes ===
- 2001 New Order - "Someone Like You"
- 2001 Way Out West - "Mindcircus"
- 2001 Groove Armada - "Superstylin'"
- 2002 4 Strings - "(Take Me Away) Into the Night"
- 2002 Medicine8 - "Capital Rocka"
- 2002 Balligomingo - "Purify"
- 2002 Andain - "Summer Calling"
- 2002 Paul Oakenfold - "Southern Sun"
- 2002 Tiësto - "In My Memory"
- 2002 Weekend Players - "I'll Be There"
- 2002 Roger Goode - "In the Beginning..."
- 2002 Ils - "Music"
- 2002 Jewel - "Serve the Ego"
- 2002 Beber & Tamra - "Travelling On"
- 2003 Lili Haydn - "Anything"
- 2003 Depeche Mode - "Here Is the House"
- 2003 Nalin & Kane - "Beachball"
- 2003 Andain - "Beautiful Things"
- 2003 Three Drives - "Carrera 2"
- 2003 Sarah McLachlan - "Fallen"
- 2003 Gabriel & Dresden vs. Coldplay - "Clocks (Bootleg Mashup using "Serendipity")"
- 2003 Dave Gahan - "I Need You"
- 2003 Deborah Cox - "Play Your Part"
- 2003 Evanescence - "Hello"
- 2003 Jewel - "Intuition"
- 2003 Britney Spears feat. Madonna - "Me Against the Music"
- 2003 Duncan Sheik - "On a High"
- 2003 Annie Lennox - "Pavement Cracks"
- 2003 Annie Lennox - "A Thousand Beautiful Things"
- 2003 Grayarea - "One for the Road"
- 2004 Above & Beyond - "No One on Earth"
- 2004 Kristine W - "Save My Soul"
- 2004 The Engine Room - "A Perfect Lie"
- 2004 Dido - "Don't Leave Home"
- 2005 Rachael Starr - "Till There Was You"
- 2005 Perasma - "Swing 2 Harmony"
- 2005 Motorcycle - "Around You"
- 2005 Özgür Can - "Changed"
- 2005 Nicol Sponberg - "Resurrection"
- 2006 Gustavo Santaolalla - "The Wings"
- 2006 Robbie Rivera - "Float Away" (re-edit of Original Mix)
- 2006 Markus Schulz & Departure with Gabriel & Dresden - "Without You Near"
- 2007 D. Ramirez & Mark Knight - "Colombian Soul" (re-edit of Original Mix)
- 2007 Monochrome - "Pearl"
- 2007 68 Beats - "Replay the Night"
- 2007 The Killers - "Read My Mind"
- 2007 Shiny Toy Guns - "You Are the One"
- 2008 Faithless - "A Kind of Peace"
- 2011 Andain - "Promises"
- 2012 Andain - "Turn Up the Sound"
- 2018 Above & Beyond - "Is It Love? (1001)"
- 2020 SevenLions & Haliene - "What's Done is Done"
- 2021 BT and Christian Burns - "Red Lights"

== Awards and nominations ==
Year	Category	Issuer	Result
2003	Top 100 DJs	DJMag	42nd
2004	Top 100 DJs	DJMag	41st
2004	Best Producers	IDMA	Won
2004	Best Progressive/Trance Track for "As the Rush Comes" by Motorcycle	IDMA	Won
2004	Best Underground Dance Track for "As the Rush Comes" by Motorcycle	IDMA	Nominated
2005	Top 100 DJs	DJMag	29th
2005	Best Remixers	IDMA	Nominated
2006	Top 100 DJs	DJMag	20th
2006	Best Remixers	IDMA	Won
2006	Best Progressive House/Trance Track for "Without You Near" by Markus Schulz, Gabriel & Dresden & Departure	IDMA	Nominated
2006	Ortofon Best American DJ Award	IDMA	Nominated
2006	Best Producers	IDMA	Nominated
2007
2007	Top 100 DJs	DJMag	23rd
2007	Best Progressive House/Trance Track for "Tracking Treasure Down"	IDMA	Nominated
2007	Best Producers	IDMA	Nominated
2007	Best Alternative/Rock Dance Track for "Dangerous Power"	IDMA	Won
2007	Best Ortofon American DJ	IDMA	Won
2008
2008	Best Progressive House/Trance Track for "Dangerous Power"	IDMA	Nominated
2008	Best American DJs	IDMA	Won
2008	Best Global DJs	IDMA	Nominated
2008	Best Dance Artist (Group)	IDMA	Nominated
2008	Post-break-up		
2008	Top 100 DJs	DJMag	65th
2008	Best International DJs for an event at X2 club in Jakarta, Indonesia	REDMA	Won
2009	Best American DJs	IDMA	Nominated
