= The Cover Up (album) =

Studio album by I Am the World Trade Center
- Released: June 29, 2004
- Genre: Indietronica, synthpop
- Length: 36:50
- Label: Gammon Records

I Am the World Trade Center chronology
The Tight Connection (2002)	The Cover Up (2004)

Professional ratings
Review scores
Source	Rating
AllMusic	3.5/5 stars
Pitchfork Media	(7.2/10)
PopMatters	(Favourable)
Stylus Magazine	3.5/5 stars

The Cover Up is the third album from synthpop band I Am the World Trade Center, released in 2004. It is the first album released after the closure of the band's record label, Kindercore, which was co-founded by Dan Geller. It is also the first album released by Geller and Amy Dykes after their romantic break-up.

The album contains a cover of The Jam's "Going Underground." It was co-produced and mixed by electronic dance music pioneer and Mephisto Odyssey founder Mikael Johnston.

== Track listing ==
1. "No Expectations" – 2:46
2. "Great Escape" – 3:15
3. "Future Sightings" – 3:14
4. "Love Tragedy" – 2:59
5. "Follow Me" – 2:26
6. "Deny It" – 2:44
7. "Going Underground" – 3:11
8. "Different Stories" – 2:58
9. "His 'N' Hers" – 2:51
10. "The Cover Up" – 3:40
11. "Silent Film Stars" – 3:56
12. "Rock It" – 2:48
