= The Only Road =

The Only Road may refer to:

- The Only Road (film), a 1918 American silent western film
- The Only Road (album), a 2017 progressive trance album by Gabriel & Dresden
- The Only Road (book), a 2016 book by Alexandra Diaz
