= Organized Nature =

American record label

- Founded: 2005
- Founder: Josh Gabriel; Dave Dresden
- Genre: Electronic
- Country of origin: United States

Organized Nature was a record label founded in the spring of 2005 by San Francisco DJs Gabriel & Dresden. The label was UK based via Gabriel & Dresden's management company and Plastic Fantastic Label Management. It last released music in 2014.

== Radio show ==
The label also had a monthly radio show of the same name. It was broadcast on Proton Radio on the first Friday of the each month at Noon EST. It lasted 60 minutes and played progressive electronica. The show was placed on hiatus when Gabriel and Dresden separated in 2014. The duo reunited in 2011. In 2014, they produced a further three episodes of the radio show, released on Digitally Imported Radio.

== History ==
The first track to be released was "Arcadia" which gained large success on mainstream. Monochrome, is a Romanian trio consisting of Livio, Roby and George G who were declared the Global Winners of Heineken Thirst Studio competition, which was looking for fresh new producer talent. Gabriel & Dresden were judges at the finals of the contest and chose Monochrome.

We’re really excited about this release, from how it came about to the version we did. It's just more proof that you never know where the next great tune is going to come from...and the reason why we do our label - to find new artists to work with. I think it's a tip of the hat to the guys that we only used their sounds in our remix.... the mark of a great track!

— Dave Dresden

Part of their prize for winning the Heineken Thirst Studio Competition and The People's Choice Award was to travel to the Palm Studios in Las Vegas to work on their track, "Pearl" with duo Gabriel & Dresden. The single was later released through the Organized Nature.

The label was brought back as an imprint of Armada in 2012 after the reunion of Gabriel & Dresden. The first release was Gabriel & Dresden vs Secret Panda Society - No Reservations. The label continued to release music until 2014 and is currently inactive.

== Singles/EPs ==
- ORGN001 Gabriel & Dresden - Arcadia
- OND001 Josh Gabriel - Alive (Instrumental) / Dub Horizon
- ORGN002 Gabriel & Dresden - Portobello / Serendipity
- ORGN003 Özgür Can - Changed
- ORGN004 Bigtop - Sub/Tidal
- ORGN005 Gabriel & Dresden - Tracking Treasure Down
- ORGN006 Gabriel & Dresden - Mass Repeat / Eleven
- ORGN007 Retrobyte - Going Down
- ORGN008 Gabriel & Dresden - Dangerous Power
- ORGN009 Deep Flexion - Emotions of The Night
- ORGN010 Josh Gabriel - Summit
- ORGN011 Pearl - Monochrome
- ORGN012 & 13 Gabriel & Dresden vs Secret Panda Society - No Reservations (2012)
- ORGN014 Gabriel & Dresden (featuring Betsie Larkin) - Play it Back (2012))
- Gabriel & Dresden – Rise Up (2014)
- Gabriel & Dresden – Rise Up (Cold Blue Remix) (2014)
- Gabriel & Dresden – New Ground (2014)

== Albums ==
- ORGNCD001 Gabriel & Dresden - Gabriel & Dresden (Mixed)
- ORGNCD006 Gabriel & Dresden - Gabriel & Dresden (Mixed) + (Unmixed)
- ORGNCD101 Gabriel & Dresden - Gabriel & Dresden (2XCD).

== Artists ==
- Özgür Can
- Pearl
- Gabriel & Dresden
- Retrobyte (Christopher Norman)
- Deep Flexion
- Dave Dresden
- Josh Gabriel
- Bigtop
- Motorcycle

== See also ==
List of electronic music record labels
