= The Tight Connection =

Studio album by I Am the World Trade Center
- Released: July 9, 2002
- Genre: Indietronica, synthpop
- Length: 36:21
- Label: Kindercore

I Am the World Trade Center chronology
Out of the Loop (2001)	The Tight Connection (2002)	The Cover Up (2004)

Professional ratings
Aggregate scores
Source	Rating
Metacritic	58/100
Review scores
Source	Rating
AllMusic	3/5 stars
Alternative Press	3/5 stars
Pitchfork	5.0/10
The Village Voice	C

The Tight Connection is the second album from I Am the World Trade Center, the New York City-based synthpop band. The album was released in 2002, and it contains covers of the Stone Roses' "Shoot You Down" and Blondie's "Call Me."

== Track listing ==
1. "The Postcard" – 2:48
2. "Big Star" – 2:58
3. "Believe in Me" – 3:26
4. "Shoot You Down" – 4:35
5. "Pretty Baby" – 2:55
6. "Hold On to My Lines" – 2:34
7. "Call Me" – 3:55
8. "Can't Take the Heat" – 2:56
9. "California Dreaming Again" – 3:18
10. "Dancing Alone" – 3:05
11. "Soiree" – 3:51
