= Dave Dresden =

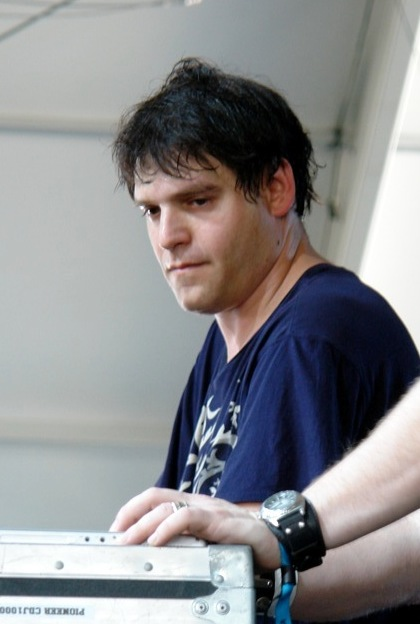
- Dresden performing with Gabriel & Dresden at Coachella Festival in 2006.

Background information
- Also known as: Dave "The Wave" Dresden
- Born: May 20, 1969 (age 56)
- Origin: Stamford, Connecticut, United States
- Genres: Progressive trance, house, EDM
- Occupation(s): DJ, producer, remixer, A&R, music director, journalist
- Years active: 1988–present
- Labels: Organized Nature, Problem Child

Dave Dresden is an American electronic dance music DJ and producer, co-founder of the collaborative acts Gabriel & Dresden with Josh Gabriel, and Dresden and Johnston with Mikael Johnston.

== History ==
=== 1988–2000: Early years ===
Dresden's zeal for dance music and culture developed early in high school where he frequented local Connecticut dance clubs and befriended The Café's DJ Moby, a local disc jockey. His early experiences at the Café fueled his passion to immerse himself in the culture that would become his career and lifelong obsession. From there, he purchased a pair of Technics SP-1300 pitch controlled CD players and got to work. Dresden quickly cultivated a following due to his simple but effective music policy; play the right track at the right time and only play great songs. His ambitions did not stop with spinning. While he continued to play in the clubs sometimes five nights a week, he became a dance music journalist by day. Dresden was named a reporter to the Billboard dance chart, and he began writing reviews and features for national magazines such as Dance Music Authority, DJ Times and Mixer. Dresden profiled Daft Punk, Paul Oakenfold, Moby, Masters at Work, Todd Terry, Sasha & Digweed, Puff Daddy, BT, Crystal Method, Keoki, Josh Wink, Chemical Brothers, Deep Dish amongst many others. Many of these artists' first American press came through Dresden's journalism efforts.

Dresden's affiliation with respected publications gave him easier access to obscure and unreleased tunes upfront, giving him an edge. He regularly contributed his A&R skills to Promo Only CD's and its "Mainstream Club" "Import Club" and "Alternative Club" series. In addition, he scouted new music for Pete Tong's highly influential Essential Selection radio show on the BBC Radio 1. Through his efforts there, Dresden hipped Pete to some rather large records, many of which became "Essential New Tunes", Tong's method of gauging a guaranteed hit. Dresden's wide knowledge of dance music led to the opportunity to help select songs for Nettwerk Records' popular "Plastic Compilation" series. Dresden has also had a hand in producing compilation CD's and single releases with other independent labels such as Strictly Rhythm, Strictly Hype, 4 Play and Max Music. In addition, he's accredited by his own releases for Strictly Hype's trance offshoot Sunrise; "Trancendence: The First Wave", and the hit packed "Transit". His radio career began with the long running, highly rated "Electro Circus," which aired on Hartford, Connecticut's modern rock station WMRQ-FM from 1996 until 2000. Dresden's radio career continued as music director and on-air personality for grooveradio.com, an internet radio station during the year 2000.

=== 2001–2008: Gabriel & Dresden ===
In 2000 Dave became the Music Director of Swedish Egil's grooveradio.com where he met Pete Tong, who asked him to help find music for the Essential Selection. They met at a party being hosted by grooveradio.com at the Miami Winter Music Conference in March 2001. Josh Gabriel gave Leon Alexander a record, the record was "Wave 3", which Dave then gave to Pete Tong, and he played it on the Essential Selection and also used it for his compilation that same year. Pete gave Dave the opportunity to do a remix of New Order Someone Like You and Dave asked Josh to work on it with him. The two joined forces in 2001 and made a name for themselves by creating numerous remixes for artists as diverse as Tiësto, Paul Oakenfold, Sarah Mclachlan, Way Out West, Annie Lennox, Duncan Sheik, and Jewel (singer).

In 2002 Gabriel & Dresden released their first single "Lament" on Saw Recordings in the United States. The duo released numerous singles and number one Billboard hits like "As the Rush Comes" (as Motorcycle), "Tracking Treasure Down" and "Dangerous Power"; they also released one self-titled studio album together, Gabriel & Dresden which was named as the "2006 Album of the Year" by M8 magazine.

The duo won the 2007 and 2008 IDMA award for "America's Best DJ". He has achieved 21 Billboard Dance Chart #1 tracks (remixes and originals) as "Gabriel & Dresden", composed music that has appeared on Fox, HBO, NBC and CBS TV shows. Gabriel & Dresden have their own record label, Organized Nature which is distributed by Armada Music.

=== 2009–2010: Solo years ===
After the break-up of Gabriel & Dresden, Dave collaborated with Chris Cox on a track called "Whole Wide World", which was played on Pete Tong's Essential Selection on April 4, 2008. Dave also worked with Trent Cantrelle on a remix for Serge Devant's cover of the Beloved's "Sweet Harmony". On June 22, Dave opened a set for Tiësto's In Search of Sunrise: North American Summer Tour 2008 in Connecticut. He also co-wrote and co-produced "I've Had Friends" with Morgan Page which was the 4th single from his album Believe (Morgan Page album)

In December 2008, Dresden teamed up with longtime friend and Mephisto Odyssey founder Mikael Johnston to remix Lily Allen's "The Fear" under the new moniker Dresden and Johnston. The new production duo went on to remix a number of artists including Nadia Ali's "Love Story" and Enrique Iglesias's "Tonight (I'm Fuckin' You)", all of which hit the #1 position in Billboard's Hot Dance Club Songs Chart. Dresden and Johnston's first original single called "Keep Faith" Featuring Mezo Riccio followed in early 2010 and went to #10 in Billboard's Hot Dance Club Songs chart and top 5 on Sirius radio's BPM (Sirius XM) and Club Phusion. The single featured remixes by fellow producers Morgan Page and Harry Romero. A forthcoming full-length album by the duo featuring guest vocalists Nadia Ali, Jan Burton and Skylar Grey was planned but is yet to be released.

=== Gabriel & Dresden reunion (2011–present) ===
On December 31, 2010, Gabriel & Dresden reunited for special one off New Year's Eve celebration alongside ATB and Francis Preve at the Hollywood Palladium in Los Angeles.

Shortly afterward, the duo were booked on the Anjunabeats WMC Miami party at the Ice Palace as a special guest. Since this event, Gabriel & Dresden have officially announced themselves as reunited.

Since the reunion, Gabriel & Dresden have performed at many clubs and festivals around the world including Electric Daisy Carnival (Las Vegas, Dallas, Chicago & Orlando), Tomorrowland in Belgium, Electric Zoo Festival in New York, Sunburn Festival in India, Escape From Wonderland, Nocturnal Wonderland, Paradiso Festival, Creamfields Australia, ASOT 550: Invasion, Ministry of Sound, London, Zouk and a monthly residency at the Marquee Las Vegas in Las Vegas.

In 2011 they signed an artist deal with Armada Music which brought forth their mix compilation "Mixed for Feet, Volume 1" as well as numerous singles including 2012'a "Play it Back" featuring Betsie Larkin, "Tomorrow Comes" with Neil Ormandy (2013), "Shatter" (with D-Wayne) and a re-working of Tracking Treasure Down Revisited.

On February 3, 2014, they restarted their monthly radio show "Gabriel & Dresden present Organized Nature" on Digitally Imported's progressive channel. Since this show was already on the air in the past, it began this time around with Episode 30.

Since the COVID-19 pandemic began, Dave Dresden has hosted livestream performances via Gabriel & Dresden's Twitch channel. The new show, Club Quarantine, includes weekly broadcasts such as Techno Tuesday, New Music Friday, and Classics Saturday.

== Personal life ==
Graduated in class of 88' from Westhill High School in Stamford, Connecticut.

Dresden got married in September 2012 to Holly Carrington. They have one daughter together, Charlotte Lily Dresden born on July 15, 2013. They filed for divorce in 2017 and the divorce was finalized in Austin, Texas on July 3, 2018.

== Discography ==
For discography as Gabriel & Dresden, see Gabriel & Dresden discography.
For awards as Gabriel & Dresden, see Gabriel & Dresden Awards / Nominations.

=== Singles ===
- New Gold Dream (81-82-83-84) as The Consumers (with Dave Ralph)
- Use Only The Drugs (as Attention Deficit) 2003
- Goddess (as Summit) 2004
- Chris Cox & Dave Dresden - Whole Wide World 2008 (unreleased)
- Morgan Page & Dave Dresden - I've Had Friends (feat. Jan Burton) 2008
- Dave Dresden & Grayarea - Cloud Atlas 2009 (unreleased)
- Dresden & Johnston vs. Debo ft. Mezo - Keep Faith 2010 (released) Problem Child Rekords
- Dave Dresden, Super 8 & Tab - Black Ice 2009 (unreleased)
- Dresden & Johnston - That Day (feat. Nadia Ali) 2009 (unreleased)
- Dresden & Johnston - I Hear You Calling (feat. David Penner & Essence) 2009 (unreleased)
- Dresden & Johnston - Racecar (feat Holly Brook) 2010 (unreleased)
- Dresden & Johnston - Undertow (feat Holly Brook) 2010 (unreleased)
- Dresden & Johnston - I Know You (Feat Holly Brook) 2010 (unreleased)

=== Remixes ===
- Lily Allen The Fear (as Dresden & Johnston) 2009
- Nadia Ali Love Story (as Dresden & Johnston) 2009
- BT The Unbreakable (as Dresden & Johnston) (unreleased)
- JD Webb Better Man (as Dresden & Johnston) 2009
- The Crystal Method Black Rainbows (as Dresden & Johnston)
- Enrique Iglesias feat. Ludacris Tonight (as Dresden & Johnston)
- Morgan Page & Dave Dresden I've Had Friends (as Dresden & Johnston) (unreleased)
- Linkin Park Waiting For The End (as Dave Dresden)

=== Compilations ===
- Trancendence - The First Wave 2000
- Transit 200
- Provocative Progressive 2002

=== Co-productions ===
- Armin van Buuren - Zocalo
- Markus Schulz - Without You Near
- Christina Aguilera - Hurt (Christina Aguilera song) (Chris Cox Club Anthem)
