= Stella von Schöneberg =

Stèlla von Schöneberg
- Cover of Schöneberg's album Shadows.

Background information
- Born: March 22, 1978 (age 48); Germany
- Genre: Pop music
- Occupation: Singer-Entertainer Icon-Songwriter
- Instrument: Vocals
- Years active: 2010–present
- Labels: Proton Music Inc., Spicy Music

Stèlla von Schöneberg, also known as Stèlla (sVs) / Stella_G, is a German pop singer, entertainer and songwriter. She is known for her live performances and her music-fashion catWalk projects. Her album "WOT" ranked 2014 at No. 4 in Europe charts and topped the Billboard Dance No. 25 in USA.

== Early life ==
Stèlla von Schöneberg began performing at the age of 10 years in a monastery in Greece, where she was taught to sing the Byzantine sounds and to play keyboard. Stella was the singer of the bands: Prosechos (Greece), Come-Out (D) and Polygon (USA). Later, she started performing in the international pop music scene as a solo artist and enrolled at Frankfurt University as a Masters of Sciences of Sports & Music Arts.

== Career ==
von Schöneberg signed with B12 Records (Berlin) to release her initial album, Cosmic Energy, in 2010.

In June 2011, Stella_G feat Bocca Negra KamaSutra was released. In 2013, DJ Prithvi, Asia's youngest DJ from India and von Schöneberg cooperated on the single album "Beat the Box", a song which was released for the India Fashion-Music Tour.

In March 2014, Asha Puthli supported her album WOT feat. Misteralf vs. Stefano Ravasini at Winter Music Week/Miami, signed by Cult Note Records (IT). The album ranked #4 on the iTunes house-music-charts in Europe and hit #26 at the Billboard Dance40 chart USA. In 2015, von Schöneberg signed with Proton Music Inc. based in San Francisco/USA for her further album releases.

"Roomservice", released in March 2015, was included on the album Souling Move Records/Spain and was later released in November by Proton Music Inc./USA

Afterparty was released in January 2016 and ranked #14 on the Reverbnation EDM Charts. von Schöneberg composed the music and lyrics. In February 2016, von Schöneberg released the album Venus Power for the WMC (Miami Music Week). In March 2016 the album Chatroom was released for the Ultra Festival Miami.

In October 2016, the album Happy Birthday was released. It included various remixes. von Schöneberg composed the music and lyrics, orchestration, mixed and mastered by DjAB (India). It ranked #6 on Reverbnations EDM Charts London in January 2017. In December 2016, the album Homosapian was released, including 2 songs "Homosapian" and "Catwalk". With her song "Catwalk", Schöneberg opened various Fashion Week shows in Europe, USA, Dubai and India. The project started 2013/14 with Alina in New York City by her brand LaL Couture. 2016/18 Stèlla collaborated with Charles of London (UK) who created a capsule collection of the Swim & Stagewear collection of her and easySun Greece. 2019/20 she worked with Alexander Hitek's from London/Cyprus special avant-garde eyewear.

In January 2017, von Schöneberg released "Shadows" and "Boys & Girls". In January 2018, she released her album I have told you followed in April by the album Guestlist.

In 2020, von Schöneberg signed with Greek label Spicy Music. In July that year, she released the album You're my King. In March 2021, von Schöneberg released "Is It Me? " with Proton Music and in July 2021, she released "Come & Find Me" with Spicy Music.

In December 2021, von Schöneberg released the album You Are Forever with Spicy Music. In August 2022, she released "Holidays in Greece" through Proton Music. In June 2023, Schöneberg released "Iposchethika/(EN translate: I Promised)" at Proton Music. She resettled to Greece and turned into Electro-Oriental World Music the polyphone sound-project Music: Stèlla von Schöneberg & Tahir Klavye, Lyrics: Stèlla von Schöneberg, orchestration, mixed and mastered by Savvas Lagizos.

In May 2024, von Schöneberg released "I Promised" at Dacru Records. In January 2025, she released "Mysirlou", at Proton Music, in June 2026, "You stole my peace", and "Is it true", and in September 2026, "Ah! I Telefaiai Sou Volta" at LANDR.

== Musical style ==
von Schöneberg describes herself as a musician who expresses her feelings, emotion, and music as a meadow full of colorful wildflowers and insects.

== Discography ==
- AH! I TELEFTAIA SOU VOLTA (2026)
- IS IT TRUE (2026)
- YOU STOLE MY PEACE (2026)
- MYSIRLOU (2025)
- I Promised (2024)
- Iposchethika (2023)
- Holidays In Greece (2022)
- You Are Forever (2021)
- Come And Find Me (2021)
- Is It Me? (2021)
- You're my King (2020)
- Guestlist (2018)
- Boys & Girls (2017)
- Shadows (2016)
- Homosapian (2016)
- Catwalk (2016)
- Happy Birthday (2016)
- Afterparty (2016)
- Chatroom (2016)
- Venus Power (2016)
- RoomService (2016)
- WOT (2014)
- BEAT THE BOX (2014)
- KAMASUTRA (2011)
- Cosmic Energy (2010)
