= The Only Road (album) =

Studio album by Gabriel & Dresden
- Released: 15 December 2017
- Genres: Progressive house; trance; downtempo
- Length: 68:00
- Label: Anjunabeats
- Producer: Gabriel & Dresden

Gabriel & Dresden chronology
Gabriel & Dresden (2006)	The Only Road (2017)	Remedy (2020)

Singles from The Only Road
- 1. "This Love Kills Me" Released: 6 October 2017; 2. "Waiting for Winter" Released: 11 November 2017; 3. "White Walls" Released: 11 November 2017; 4. "You" Released: 8 December 2017

The Only Road is the second studio album by American electronic music duo Gabriel & Dresden, released on December 15, 2017 through Anjunabeats. This album marks their first collaborative effort together since their 2006 hiatus, where they separated to pursue their solo careers. The idea for the album was initially put forward in a Kickstarter campaign where the duo originally asked for $30,000 to cover studio and recording sessions, but managed to raise $73,000 from 700 backers after the campaign's deadline.

== Background ==
In the year 2008, Gabriel & Dresden decided to split up after completing their Winter Music Conference tour, with an extended five-hour set and a closing one-hour set. The decision was due to internal conflicts they had with the direction they would be going as artists, which was worsened with Dresden's drug use issue and them not being able to get along while in the studio. They still had reunions with one another, including a performance at the Hollywood Palladium on the 2010 New Year's Eve Day and a world tour which followed from May to October 2011, where they officially announced themselves as reunited. From 2015 to 2016, they embarked on an 18-month tour titled "Classics Only", where they only played music revolving around their old productions and selected modern tracks.

During a two-hour conversation they held in 2016, the duo decided to talk about what made their relationship decline, which was never addressed previously. This eventually rebuilt the trust they had in each other, with them knowing each other's strengths and weaknesses better. They launched a fundraising campaign on Kickstarter for a new album titled The Only Road to raise money for living expenses, as they lack the financial support of a record label and will not be touring during the album's production. Out of the $30,000 which was asked as a gauge of interest, they closed the campaign receiving $73,172 from 700 backers.

We were scared about that. That's admitting to fans you don't have any money. Being in the public eye, you want people to know you're larger than life. So we were putting ourselves in a vulnerable place. But we almost funded the whole thing in one day. We didn't know we had that many people that loved us and were waiting for new music from us. That got us in the right frame of mind.

—Dave Dresden, with regard to the funding of their album through Kickstarter

Based on Gabriel & Dresden, the inspiration to produce the album came from the return of melody and emotion in modern electronic music. "Melody and emotion are making a comeback. This re-awakening inspired us after 11 years to make a new album. We wanted to get back to our roots and make something that celebrated our past while at the same time, giving us a chance to look to the future," stated the duo. The album's title was revealed to be a play on the words "home is where the heart lies", which Gabriel described as "trying to stay true to ourselves" which was the road they followed to "lead them home" to what they know and believe.

The first single of the album, "This Love Kills Me", was released on 6 October 2017 through Anjunabeats. The track was also remixed by Above & Beyond, which was premiered during their 250th Group Therapy episode held at The Gorge Amphitheatre. It was followed with a 2-track EP release on 7 November 2017 titled "White Walls", covering tracks "Waiting for Winter" and "White Walls". The final single prior to the album's release was titled "You" and was released on 8 December 2017, one week before its arrival.

== Track listing ==
Tracklist adapted from AllMusic

No.	Title	Length
1.	"Only Road" (featuring Sub Teal)	5:53
2.	"Free Your Mind"	5:43
3.	"White Walls" (featuring Sub Teal)	3:59
4.	"This Love Kills Me" (featuring Sub Teal)	4:43
5.	"Underwater" (featuring Jan Burton)	6:36
6.	"Hospital Piano"	2:42
7.	"You" (featuring Jan Burton)	6:09
8.	"Sequoia"	6:05
9.	"Over Oceans" (featuring Josh Gabriel)	5:34
10.	"Waiting for Winter" (featuring Jan Burton)	6:38
11.	"Jupiter"	6:16
12.	"I'm Not Like Everybody Else" (featuring Sub Teal)	7:42
Total length:		68:00

== Critical reception ==
The Only Road was met with positive reception upon release. Grace Fleisher of Dancing Astronaut describes the album as "a highly contentious body of work that dates back to the sonic heyday of one of dance music's most diligent virtuosos". Grace went on to praise the album's singles by highlighting the usage of infectious melodies and Sub Teal's vocals in "This Love Kills Me", and points out the ability of Jan Burton's vocals to produce a brooding atmosphere. The Nocturnal Times Mark Mancino states that The Only Road is "full of genuine, mind-bending and body-moving creations”, and compliments the album for bringing out nostalgic feelings among its listeners. Thomas Keulemans of We Rave You calls The Only Road a "true piece of art" and the "best album of 2017", praising Gabriel & Dresden's skills to produce a multi-genre album whose tracks blend well together to create a fascinating story.

== Personnel ==
Credits adapted from AllMusic and Discogs.

Technical and composing credits

- Josh Gabriel – primary artist, producer
- Dave Dresden – primary artist, producer
- Jan Burton – primary artist, vocals
- Sub Teal – primary artist, vocals

Recording personnel

- Walter Coelho – mastering
- Chris Allen – mixing

== Release history ==
Region	Date	Format	Label	Reference
Worldwide	December 15, 2017	Digital download	Anjunabeats	
Worldwide	December 22, 2017	CD	Anjunabeats	
