= Jes (musician) =

American singer (born 1974)

JES
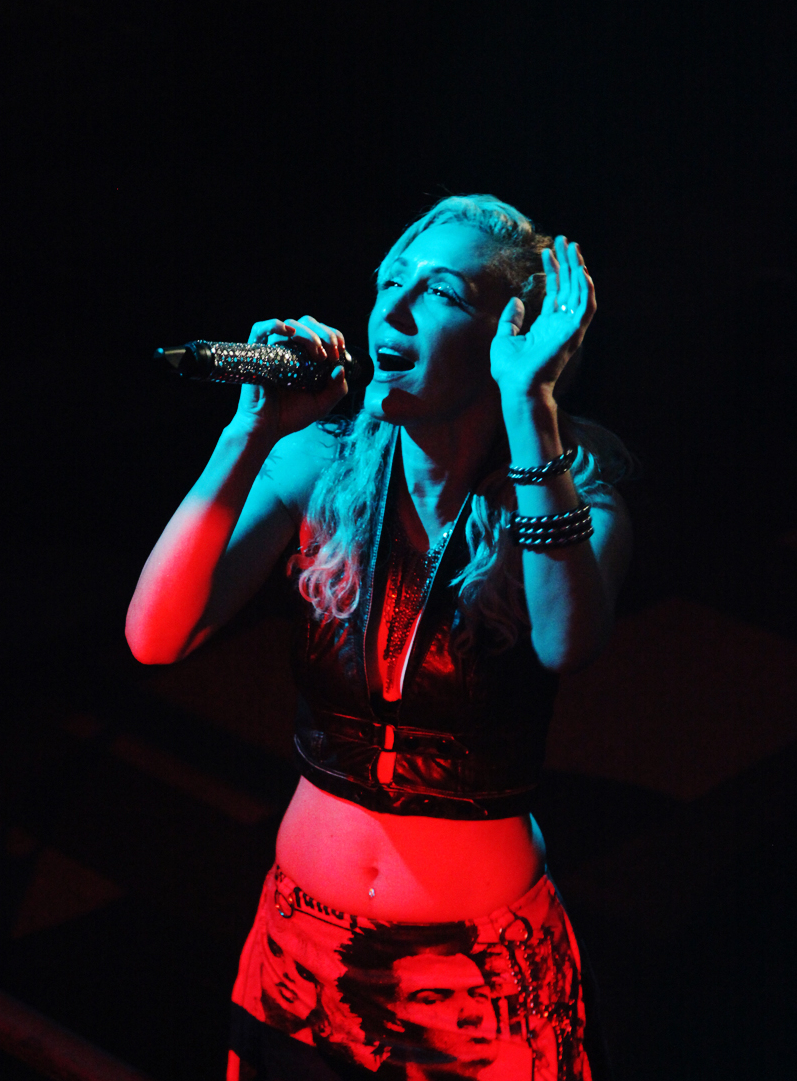
- Jes in 2011

Background information
- Also known as: Taxigirl
- Born: Jes Brieden; May 10, 1974 (age 52); New York City, U.S.
- Genres: Electronica, trance, pop
- Occupations: Singer; record producer; songwriter
- Instrument: Vocals
- Labels: Intonenation Records; Black Hole Recordings; Magik Muzik; Ultra Records
- Website: officialjes.com

Jes Brieden (born May 10, 1974), known professionally as Jes (stylized as JES), is an American singer, songwriter, producer, composer, and DJ. She is a co-founder of the US dance band Motorcycle, who released the song "As the Rush Comes" in 2003.

== Early life ==
Jes Brieden, born and raised in New York City, studied art and singing in an art school. She first began experimenting with music production at her friends' studios. By age 16 she made her first vocal recordings as a reference vocalist, and was also working as a backup singer for several major recording labels. After Jes answered an ad in the newspaper called The Village Voice when she was still a teenager, she recorded her first song. At the time, she sang in various bands.

== Career ==
=== 2002: Guardians of the Earth ===
In 2001, while she was working at a recording studio in LA, Jes met Mike Olson, and the two formed Guardians of the Earth. Songs they produced include "Star Children" and "One Moon Circling". "Star Children" was included on Paul van Dyk's 2001 Ministry of Sound compilation The Politics of Dancing. Inspired by this new voice of herself, she began working with more DJs and producers and went on to form Motorcycle with Gabriel & Dresden and performed the vocals on the instant club hit and Billboard No. 1 song "As the Rush Comes" (2004).

=== 2003–2005: Motorcycle ===
Jes Brieden's most well known works were created with Josh Gabriel and Dave Dresden, known as Gabriel & Dresden. They formed the group Motorcycle, and its 2003 hit "As the Rush Comes" was a number one single on Billboard's Hot Dance Airplay chart in 2004, where it also became the first year-end number one Dance Airplay track of the same year. "As the Rush Comes" gave Jes international exposure, which then allowed her to perform in larger venues and festivals such as the Bacardi Festival (Lebanon), Fresh (Malta), World Electronic Music Festival (Toronto), Escape in the Park (United Kingdom), Los Angeles Memorial Sports Arena, and Red Rocks Amphitheatre (Denver). Jes had performed on the United Kingdom's "Top of The Pops" TV show alongside Beyoncé and Maroon 5. Motorcycle released a new song called Deep Breath Love. A mash-up by Dave Dresden with Sedna by 16 Bit Lolita's was included on Sharam's prestigious Global Underground 029: Dubai.

=== 2006–present: Solo career ===
After meeting Tiësto, Jes signed with his record label, Black Hole Recordings, and released her first solo album Disconnect. She also was featured on Tiësto’s artist album Elements of Life with the song "Everything" and continued to perform as the opening artist for the Tiësto Worldwide Tour of Elements of Life. Jes has also collaborated with DJs like D:Fuse, Deepsky, and Solarstone, producing tracks like "Living the Dream", "Ghost", and "Like a Waterfall". The last appears on the internationally acclaimed DJ Tiësto's In Search of Sunrise 4; her song "People Will Go" appears on In Search of Sunrise 5, "Imagination" and "High Glow" (the latter credited as TaxiGirl) on In Search of Sunrise 6, and an acoustic version of "Imagination" on Gabriel & Dresden's album Bloom.

Jes wrote and released a remix album, Into the Dawn (The Hits Disconnected), with Black Hole Recordings in January 2008, followed by an album called High Glow, supported by performances on Tiësto's Elements of Life World Tour. The album High Glow was released in Germany on March 12, 2010, and internationally on March 16, 2010. Her songs "One Moon Circling" and "Talk Like a Stranger" were covered by Mark Norman on his album Colours.

In 2012, Jes launched "Unleash The Beat", a weekly 1-hour radio show featuring her own tracks and mashups, and new EDM songs from other artists. The weekly show has been produced continuously for over 14 years.

== Discography ==
=== Studio albums ===
- Disconnect (2007)
- High Glow (2010)
- Memento (2022)
- Dreamer (TBA)

=== Compilation albums ===
- Into the Dawn (The Hits Disconnected) (2008)
- Unleash the Beat (2011)
- Unleash the Beat 2 (2013)
- Unleash the Beat Platinum Mix (2014)
- Unleash the Beat Blonde Mix (2014)
- Unleash the Beat 3 (2015)
- Unleash the Beat Emerald Mix (2015)
- Unleash the Beat Ultraviolet Mix (2016)

=== Extended plays ===
- Let It Snow – The Holiday EP (November 2016)

== Singles ==
=== As solo artist ===
- "I Need You" (2000)
- "Don't Say" (2000)
- "Around You" (2005)
- "People Will Go" (2006)
- "Ghost" (2007)
- "Heaven" (2007)
- "Imagination" (2008)
- "Be It All" (2008)
- "Lost in the Sound" (2009)
- "Lovesong" (2009)
- "Closer" (2010)
- "Awaken" (2011)
- "It's Too Late" (2011)
- "High Glow" (2012)
- "Sky Stand Still" (2014)
- "Two Souls" (2015)
- "Dreamweaver" (2015)
- "Photograph" (2017)
- "In Ohm" (2017)
- "Get Me Through the Night" (2017)
- "Let Him Go" (2019)
- "No One Else" (2019)
- "We Belong to the Night" (2019)
- "Under the Midnight Sun" (2020)
- "Lay Down" (2021)
- "Tight Wires" (2021)
- "Wish You Were Here" (2021)
- "Where Are You Now" (2022)
- "All or Nothing" (2022)
- "Is It True" (2022)
- "Pushing On" (2023)
- "Heartbreaker" (2023)
- "Catch Me" (2023)
- "Let It All Come Down" (2024)
- "All the Way" (2024)
- "Come With Me" (2024)
- "What Will Be" (2024)
- "Stay the Night" (2025)
- "Nothing Feels Real" (2025)
- "What If" (2025)
- "Everybody Wants to Rule the World" (2026)
- "Take Me Away" (2026)
- "We Could Be Stardust" (2026)
- "(You Make Every Day Feel Like) Sunday" (2026)

=== Co-productions ===
- "Star Children" (2001, as Guardians of the Earth)
- "One Moon Circling" (2001, as Guardians of the Earth)
- "As the Rush Comes" (2004, as Motorcycle)
- "Around You" (2004, as Motorcycle)
- "Imagination" (2004, as Motorcycle)
- "Deep, Breath, Love" (2004, as Motorcycle)
- "Blue Heart" (2006, as Motorcycle)
- "High Glow" (2007, as Taxigirl with Tiësto)

=== Collaborations ===
- "Everything With You" (2004, with D:Fuse)
- "Into Me" (2004, with D:Fuse)
- "Talk Like a Stranger" (2004, with Deepsky)
- "Living the Dream" (2005, with D:Fuse)
- "Ghost" (2006, with Deepsky)
- "Like a Waterfall" (2006, with Solarstone)
- "Everything" (2007, with Tiësto)
- "Ask" (2008, with JJ Flores & Steve Smooth)
- "My Love" (2009, with Airscape)
- "Every Other Way" (2009, with BT)
- "The Light in Things" (2010, with BT)
- "N.Y.C." (2010, with Richard Durand)
- "Show Me the Way" (2011, with Allure)
- "Can't Stop" (2011, with Ronski Speed)
- "Turn It Around" (2011, with Robbie Rivera)
- "Flying Blind" (2012, with Cosmic Gate)
- "In Your Eyes" (2012, with Ferry Corsten)
- "Before You Go" (2012, with Andy Duguid)
- "As We Collide" (2012, with Christian Burns and Paul Oakenfold)
- "Letting Go" (2013, with BT and Fractal)
- "Tonight" (2013, with BT and tyDi)
- "Higher Than the Sun" (2013, with Roger Shah and Brian Laruso)
- "Together" (2013, with ATB)
- "Hard to Cure" (2013, with ATB)
- "Right Back to You" (2013, with ATB and York)
- "Runaway" (2014, with Cold Blue and Dennis Sheperd)
- "Glitter and Gold" (2014, with Sunlounger)
- "YAI (Here We Go Again)" (2015, with Cosmic Gate)
- "Hold On" (2015, with Shant & Clint Maximus)
- "Come Back" (2015, with Tom Fall)
- "Dreaming" (2015, with BT)
- "Happy" (2015, with Austin Leeds and Redhead Roman)
- "iBelieve" (2016, with Bobina)
- "Anything Can Happen" (2016, with Fatum)
- "Stay" (2016, with Delerium)
- "Once in a Lifetime" (2016, with Delerium)
- "Fall into You" (2016, with Cosmic Gate)
- "Here & Now" (2017, with Tenishia)
- "Carry Me Away" (2017, with Game Chasers)
- "Head On" (2017, with Jochen Miller)
- "Materia" (2017, with Cosmic Gate)
- "If Not Now" (2017, with Cosmic Gate)
- "The One" (2018, with Joonas Hahmo and JS16)
- "Calling for Love" (2018, with Markus Schulz)
- "Star-crossed" (2018, with Roger Shah)
- "Heartbeat Tonight" (2018, with Elevven)
- "Say the Word" (2018, with tyDi)
- "Fading" (2019, with tyDi)
- "I Won't Let You Fall" (2019, with Aly & Fila)
- "Here With Me" (2020, with Dan Thompson)
- "Second Day" (2020, with Markus Schulz)
- "Long Way Home" (2020, with Will Atkinson)
- "Don't Let It End" (2020, with Oliver Smith)
- "Sunrise" (2021, with Aly & Fila)
- "By My Side" (2021, with Dennis Sheperd)
- "Just Believe" (2022, with tyDi)
- "Eugina" (2022, with Paul Thomas and Fuenka)
- "From This Day On" (2023, with Andrew Rayel)
- "New Horizon" (2023, with Roger Shah)
- "Spread Your Wings" (2023, with Talla 2XLC)
- "Universe" (2023, with Space Motion)
- "We'll Be Together" (2023, with Daniel Wanrooy)
- "Love Comes Quickly" (2024, with Young Parisians)
- "Come Alive" (2025, with Jerome Isma-Ae)
- "After Dark" (2025, with Dan Thompson)
- "Spellbound" (2025, with Alex M.O.R.P.H. and MRPHLNDR)
- "Call My Name" (2025, with Space Motion)
- "Separate Ways" (2026, with Richard Durand and Ciaran McAuley)
- "Right to Love" (2026, with Das Pharaoh)

=== Holiday singles ===
- "Have Yourself a Merry Little Christmas" (2016)
- "I'll Be Home for Christmas" (2018)
- "The Christmas Song" (2020)
- "Silent Night" (2021)
- "Santa Baby" (2022)
- "Winter Wonderland" (2023)
- "Last Christmas" (2024)
- "Starlight December" (2025, with York)

== Chart positions ==
- 2004 — "As the Rush Comes" # 1 – Hot Dance Airplay (Billboard)
- 2009 — "Imagination" # 1 – Hot Dance Airplay (Billboard)

== Awards and nominations ==
2004

- Won – WMC Best Progressive / Trance – "As the Rush Comes" – Motorcycle
- Nominated – WMC Best Underground Dance – "As the Rush Comes" – Motorcycle

2007

- Nominated – Grammy Award for Best Dance/Electronic Album with Tiesto, Elements of Life

2011

- Nominated – Grammy Award for Best Dance/Electronic Album with BT, These Hopeful Machines

2015

- Nominated (58th Grammy Awards) – Best Remixed Recording; "Hold On" – JES, Shant & Clint Maximus, Fatum Remix
