= Out of the Loop (I Am the World Trade Center album) =

Studio album by I Am the World Trade Center
- Released: July 17, 2001
- Genres: Indietronica; synthpop
- Length: 42:59
- Label: Kindercore Records

I Am the World Trade Center chronology
Out of the Loop (2001)	The Tight Connection (2002)

Professional ratings
Aggregate scores
Source	Rating
Metacritic	73/100
Review scores
Source	Rating
AllMusic	3.5/5 stars
Alternative Press	4/5 stars
BBC	Positive
Pitchfork Media	7.1/10
PopMatters	Positive

Out of the Loop is the debut album by American synthpop duo I Am the World Trade Center, released on July 17, 2001. Less than two months later, it gained some controversy after the September 11 attacks, due to both the band's name and the coincidental title of their 11th track, "September".

== Track listing ==
All tracks are written by Daniel Geller and Amy Dykes.

No.	Title	Length
1.	"Metro (Brooklyn Mix)"	3:16
2.	"Me to Be"	2:42
3.	"Sounds So Crazy"	2:58
4.	"Look Around You"	3:04
5.	"Light Delay"	3:01
6.	"Inside Your Head"	3:21
7.	"Holland Tunnel"	3:16
8.	"Flute Loops"	2:14
9.	"Aurora Borealis"	2:34
10.	"You Don't Even Know Her"	2:39
11.	"September"	3:31
12.	"Move On"	2:59
13.	"Analogous"	3:50
14.	"Metro (Athens Mix)"	3:34
Total length:		42:59

Japanese edition bonus tracks
No.	Title	Length
15.	"Istanbul"	2:23
16.	"Orchestral Maneuvers"	2:13
17.	"The Future of Breakdancing"	1:24
Total length:		48:59

== Personnel ==
I Am the World Trade Center

- Daniel Geller
- Amy Dykes

Additional personnel

- Ryan Lewis – graphic design
- Bren Mead – co-production
- Derek Almstead – mixing
- Glenn Schick – mastering
