= High Glow =

Studio album by Jes
- Released: March 16, 2010
- Genre: Pop, trance, electronic, alternative rock
- Label: Magik Muzik; Black Hole Recordings; Ultra Records
- Producer: Jes Brieden

Jes chronology
Into the Dawn (The Hits Disconnected) (2008)	High Glow (2010)	Memento (2022)

High Glow is the second studio album by American musician Jes, and was released on March 16, 2010.

== Track listing ==
No.	Title	Length
1.	"Awaken"	4:13
2.	"Closer"	3:54
3.	"Such a Long Time"	3:24
4.	"Fame"	3:58
5.	"Half Way Gone"	3:56
6.	"Lovesong"	3:45
7.	"Do You Love Me"	3:52
8.	"High Glow"	4:03
9.	"It's Too Late"	3:34
10.	"Where You Are"	3:33
11.	"Same Mistake"	3:51
12.	"Medicine"	3:36
13.	"See Through"	2:58
14.	"Unleash the Beat"	3:45
15.	"All Night"	4:44

iTunes Bonus Track
No.	Title	Length
16.	"Years and Years"	3:57
