= Len Wiseman =

American film director

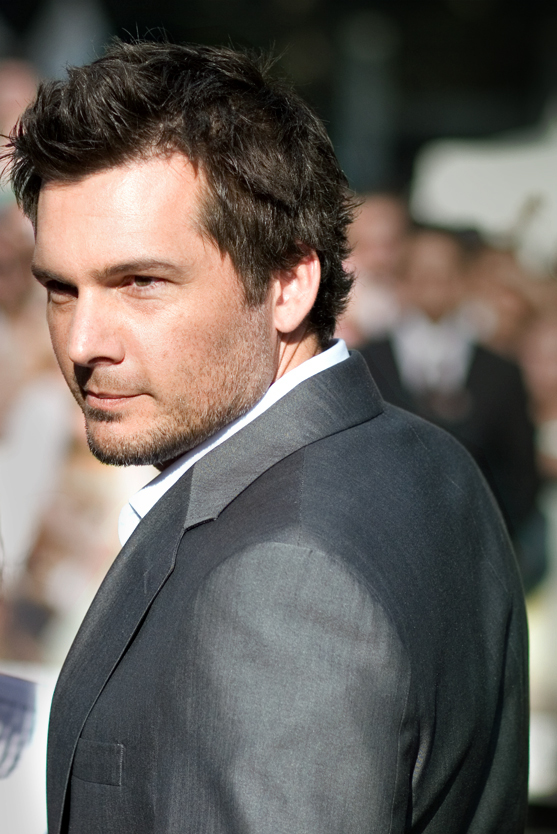
- Wiseman in 2007
- Born: Len Ryan Wiseman; March 4, 1973 (age 53); Fremont, California, U.S.
- Occupations: Director, screenwriter, producer
- Years active: 1994–present
- Spouses: Dana Wiseman (m. 1994; div. 2003) Kate Beckinsale (m. 2004; div. 2019)

Len Ryan Wiseman (born March 4, 1973) is an American film director, screenwriter, and producer. He is best known for his work on the Underworld series (2003–2016), Live Free or Die Hard (2007), the 2012 remake of Total Recall, and Ballerina (2025). Wiseman runs the production company Sketch Films.

== Early life and education ==
Wiseman was born and raised in Fremont, California. He attended American High School and later studied film at De Anza College in Cupertino, California.

== Career ==
Wiseman began his career in film as a property assistant on a number of Roland Emmerich films: Stargate (1994); Independence Day (1996); and Godzilla (1998). After creating advertisements for clients including Sony, he directed music videos for artists such as Megadeth, En Vogue, Static-X & Mephisto Odyssey. He received a Best Art Direction nomination for Quarashi's "Stick 'Em Up" at the 2002 MTV Video Music Awards and a Best Director nomination for Rufus Wainwright's "Across the Universe" at the Music Video Production Association (MVPA) Awards.

In 2003, Wiseman co-created and directed the film Underworld. Despite receiving generally negative reviews from critics, the film did well at the box office. He directed the 2006 sequel Underworld: Evolution, and produced the follow-ups Underworld: Rise of the Lycans, Underworld: Awakening, and Underworld: Blood Wars.

In 2007, he directed the fourth installment of the Die Hard series, Live Free or Die Hard, starring Bruce Willis, which opened to generally favorable reviews and box office success. He directed the 2012 release Total Recall, which starred Colin Farrell, Jessica Biel, and his wife Kate Beckinsale. In 2013, it was announced that Wiseman would direct a live action film version of the comic book series The Darkness (though no updates have been announced as of March 2016).

Wiseman has also directed the pilot episodes of three television series—the 2010 launch of CBS's Hawaii Five-0, the 2013 pilot of Fox's Sleepy Hollow, and the 2016 pilot of Fox series Lucifer. All three series were picked up for ongoing production, though Wiseman was not involved in further episodes.

It was announced on October 8, 2019, that Wiseman will direct the John Wick female-centric spin-off film titled Ballerina which was released on June 6, 2025.

== Personal life ==
Wiseman's first marriage was to a kindergarten teacher named Dana in 1994. They divorced in 2003 after Wiseman met actress Kate Beckinsale on the set of his 2003 release Underworld. Beckinsale also ended a relationship with her partner Michael Sheen.

Wiseman and Beckinsale were married on May 9, 2004, in Bel-Air, Los Angeles, California. On November 20, 2015, it was announced that they were separating and in 2016, he filed for divorce, citing "irreconcilable differences." Their divorce was finalized by November 2019.

In 2023, Wiseman proposed to actress CJ Franco in Mexico after eight years of dating.

== Filmography ==
=== Films ===
Year	Title	Director	Producer	Writer
2003	Underworld	Yes	No	Story
2006	Underworld: Evolution	Yes	Executive	Story
2007	Live Free or Die Hard	Yes	No	No
2009	Underworld: Rise of the Lycans	No	Yes	Story
2012	Underworld: Awakening	No	Yes	Yes
2012	Total Recall	Yes	Executive	No
2016	Underworld: Blood Wars	No	Yes	No
2025	Ballerina	Yes	No	No

Other credits
Year	Title	Role	Notes
1993	Quest of the Delta Knights	Miniature effects	Direct-to-video
1994	Stargate	Property assistant	
1996	Independence Day	Assistant props	
1997	Men in Black	Property assistant	Uncredited
1998	Godzilla	Props	
2011	Underworld: Endless War	Characters	Animation short, uncredited

=== Television series ===
Year(s)	Title	Director	Executive Producer	Writer	Notes
2010	Hawaii Five-0	Yes	Yes	No	Episode: ''Pilot''
2013–2017	Sleepy Hollow	Yes	Yes	Story	Creator and executive producer: 62 episodes / Director and story: ''Pilot'' / 2nd unit director: ''This Is War''
2015–2018	Lucifer	Yes	Yes	No	Director: ''Pilot'' / Executive producer: 35 episodes
2017	APB	Yes	Yes	No	Director: ''Hard Reset'' / Executive producer: 10 episodes
2017–2018	The Gifted	Yes	Yes	No	Director: ''rX'' / Executive producer: 15 episodes
2019	Swamp Thing	Yes	Yes	No	Director: ''Pilot'' & ''Worlds Apart'' / Executive producer: 10 episodes

=== Music videos ===
Year	Performer	Name	Album
1999	Kiss Destination	"Dedicated to You"	Gravity
1999	Soak	"Shuttergut (Caroline)"	Soak
1999	Megadeth	"Crush 'Em"	Risk
1999	Megadeth	"Insomnia"	Risk
1999	Vega	"Let Me Get It"	Life on Earth
1999	Second Coming	"Vintage Eyes"	Second Coming
2000	En Vogue	"Riddle"	Masterpiece Theatre
2001	Static-X	"Black and White"	Machine
2001	Mephisto Odyssey featuring Static-X	"Crash"	The Deep Red Connection
2001	Brooke Allison	"The Kiss-Off (Goodbye)"	Brooke Allison
2002	Rufus Wainwright	"Across the Universe"	I Am Sam
2002	Quarashi	"Stick 'Em Up"	Jinx

=== Commercials ===
- Sony
- PlayStation
- Nintendo DS
- Metroid Prime Hunters
