= Proton Radio =

Internet electronic music station

Proton Radio logo.

Proton Radio is an internet electronic music station founded in 2002 by Sam Packer, Alex Ambroziak, and Eric Liberda. The station features over 200 exclusive shows from various DJs around the world, including guest DJ sets from DJs such as Sasha, Luke Chable, James Zabiela, Anthony Pappa, Kasey Taylor, Lance Cashion, Oliver Lieb, Way Out West, and others. Since 2003, they have also staged an event at the annual Winter Music Conference.

Proton Radio established a record label in 2004. Proton Music has featured releases from artists such as Digital Witchcraft, Deepsky, and Stella von Schöneberg. Proton Music's first release was a compilation in October 2004 titled The Sound mixed by resident DJ Lance Cashion. The label's first single was Digital Witchcraft's "Fingerpaint", for which they held a remix contest. Proton Music releases its singles and compilations through stores including iTunes, Beatport, and Release Records.

In 2006, Proton Radio began its "On-Demand" service, allowing users access to its DJ mixes at any time.
