= Deepsky =

American electronic music act

- Origin: Albuquerque, New Mexico, United States
- Genres: Electronica
- Years active: 1995–present
- Labels: Rampant Records; Fragrant Music; Kinetic Records; Yoshitoshi Records; Release Records; Proton Music; Baroque Records
- Members: Jason Blum
- Past members: J. Scott G.
- Website: http://www.deepsky.net/

Deepsky is an electronic music act based in Los Angeles. Originally from Albuquerque, New Mexico, Deepsky was formed in 1995 by J. Scott G. and Jason Blum after the dissolution of their first band Q, active from 1992-1995. Its two founding members met originally at the University of New Mexico. Between 1995 and 1996 they concurrently comprised the Dayspring Collective with Shawn Parker, whom together released a CD on the Fragrant Music label titled Spark in 1997. Giaquinta left the band in November 2006 to focus on solo projects as well as start the group Summer Channel; Blum continues to produce and perform under the Deepsky name.

== History ==
Deepsky's first commercial release, the In My Mind EP, was released on vinyl in 1996 on Rampant Records. The title track was picked up by Nick Warren for inclusion on the Cream Live 2 compilation and set the stage for recognition by other international DJs. After moving to Fragrant Music, Deepsky released the "Stargazer" single in 1997, a hugely successful track which enjoyed global success and made appearances on compilations like Fragrant Sense by top DJs including John Digweed, DJ Micro, and John '00' Fleming. Their song "Tempest" was used as the theme music to the MTV electronica video music show Amp from 1997 to 2001. They released their first full album on Kinetic Records in 2002, titled In Silico, which features a progressive sound that differs greatly from their early work.

As In Silico gained traction in the electronic music scene, Deepsky moved heavily into the budding commercial remix market, producing progressive trance, progressive house, and progressive breaks remixes for pop artists including Madonna, Seal, David Bowie, America, Paul Oakenfold, The Crystal Method, and more. They achieved #1 slots on 2003's Billboard dance singles chart with remixes of Madonna's "Die Another Day" and "Hollywood".

With the closure of Kinetic Records in 2003, Deepsky's follow up record, tentatively titled Future Perfect, found itself in limbo. Nevertheless, a handful of singles from Future Perfect found their way to market in spite of this setback. Yo! Records, a sub-label of Deep Dish's Yoshitoshi Records, released "Talk Like a Stranger" in August 2004, with vocals performed by Jes Brieden. Proton Music distributed "Lost in the Moment" as a digital-only release in 2005, Toronto-based Release Records released "Ghost" in July 2006, and Baroque Records released "Brambledog" in November 2006. "Ghost" also features Brieden on vocals and reached the top twenty on both the Billboard Hot Dance Club Play and Hot Dance Airplay charts in early 2007.

Modern dance music producers continue to reference and remix Deepsky material. In 2020, Orkidea released a remix of Deepsky's "Cosmic Dancer" on the Pure Progressive label, which appeared on the Pure Progressive Vol. 1 compact disc set released by Black Hole Recordings.

== Albums ==
- Spark (1997) - As part of 'The Dayspring Collective'
- Stargazer EP (1999)
- In Silico (2002)

== Selected singles ==
- "Tempest"
- "Stargazer"
- "View from a Stairway"
- "Lost in the Moment"
- "Ghost" (credited to 'Deepsky featuring JES', Billboard Hot Dance Club Play #20, Hot Dance Airplay #17)
