= Nocturnal Wonderland =

U.S. electronic dance music festival

Nocturnal Wonderland (formerly Nocturnal Festival)
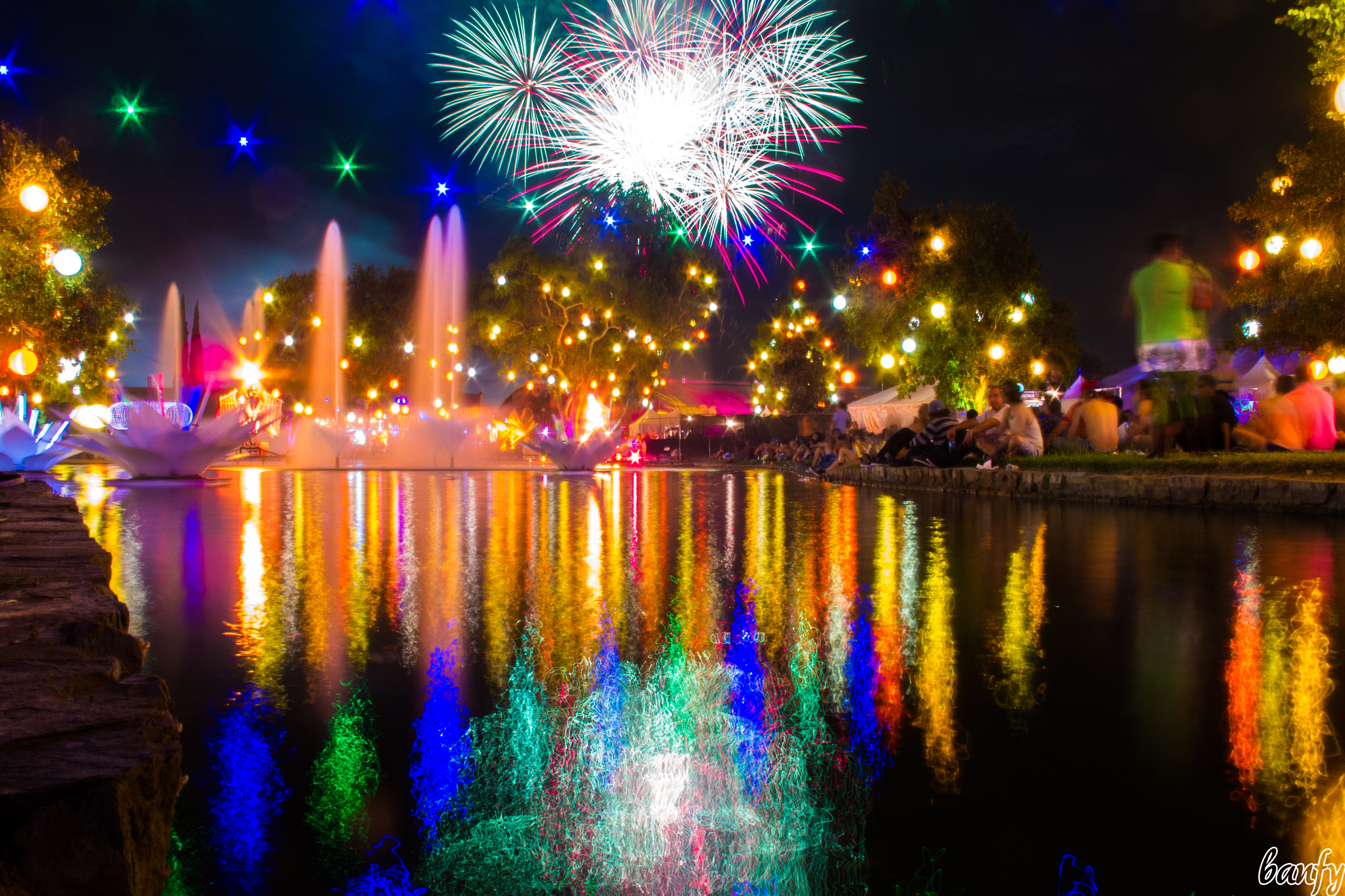
- Genre: Trance music, Dance music, Electronic dance music, House music, Drum and bass, Techno, Hardstyle
- Dates: First Weekend of September (Southern California); April (Texas)
- Locations: San Bernardino, California; Rockdale, Texas
- Years active: 1994–2001; 2003–2019, 2021–(Southern California); 2010–2012 (Texas)
- Attendance: 50,000
- Website: www.nocturnalwonderland.com

Nocturnal Wonderland, formerly known as Nocturnal Festival, is an electronic dance music festival in San Bernardino, California, United States, founded in 1995.

== History ==
Nocturnal Wonderland is a two-day event (a three-day festival from 2011 to 2016) that used to occur in early September around Labor Day. There are usually five stages with around 60 different artists performing over the two nights. The genres present at the festival vary between trance, drum and bass, breakbeat, and house.

The first Nocturnal Wonderland was held in 1995. The location varied every year in the early years, including being held at the National Orange Show Events. From 2008-2012, the festival took place at the NOS Events Center.

The Glen Helen Amphitheater has been the location of the festival every year since 2013.

On Labor Day Weekend 2010, the Nocturnal Festival Texas in Rockdale, Texas was held for the first time.

In 2016, hundreds of people were arrested at the event.

In June 2019, it was announced that 2019 would be the last year with the festival taking place at Glen Helen due to new noise ordinances in the area, however attendees voted to continue the event at the Glen Helen venue. The show went on hiatus in 2020 due to the COVID-19 pandemic, however, they did host a Virtual Rave-a-thon in place of the in-person event.

In 2021, the live event returned and took place at Glen Helen Regional Park annually. In 2024 due to heavy smoke levels from the Bridge wildfire, the event was canceled.

== Stages ==
There are usually around five main stages at the event, with different themed decorations and lighting.

- The Labyrinth: This stage has usually been located in a large warehouse-like building. In 2010, the stage was intended for a wider and taller tent, but was switched to Alice's House to increase capacity. The decorations for this stage included 20-foot (6.1 m) tall stacks of speakers, colorful designs, abstract shapes hanging from the ceiling, lasers, smoke machines, and a light display. In recent years, trapeze artists have performed above the crowd during the shows. This stage normally plays trance music.
- Alice's House: This stage was once held on a large grass field next to a man-made lagoon. An outdoor stage, it originally featured chill and soulful house. In 2010, the stage increased in capacity and hosted more upbeat and energetic house music.
- The Upside Downroom: This stage used to play host to techno and house music, but has since become a mixed-genre tent.
- The Sunken Garden: This stage is the most energy-intensive of all the stages, dedicated to drum and bass music, with large speakers, heavy bass, and MCs freestyling over the music. This stage is usually hosted by another company founded by Insomniac called 'Bassrush.'
- The Queen's Grounds: This room used to host the other attractions of the festival until 2009, when it became a house-oriented stage. In 2010, it was held in one of the bigger warehouse-like buildings that housed the main stage for 2008's Nocturnal Festival.
- The Big Top Tent: This is a mixed-genre tent playing mostly house music. It started off as one of the only stages held outside in a giant tent. Since 2010, there has been no Big Top Tent.

== See also ==
- List of electronic music festivals
