= Mephisto Odyssey =

American house music group

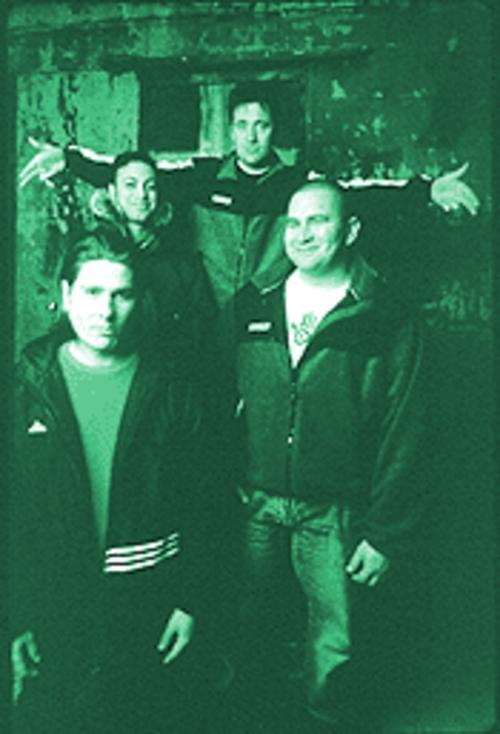
- Mephisto Odyssey in 1999

Background information
- Origin: San Francisco, California, United States
- Genres: Progressive house; electronica; house; electro house; breakbeat; acid jazz; industrial music
- Occupations: DJ; producer; remixer
- Years active: 1993–2002; 2007–present
- Labels: Mephisto; City of Angels; Warner Bros.
- Members: Mikael Johnston
- Past members: Michael Ames; Orpheos Dejournette; Barrie Eves; Josh Camacho

Mephisto Odyssey is an American house music group from San Francisco, California, United States, who have been credited with helping to pioneer the San Francisco house music sound. The group went on to release a number of self-released singles until doing tenures at City of Angels and Warner Bros. Records from the mid-1990s into the early 2000s. Mephisto Odyssey are also credited with being the only group to officially remix Jane's Addiction for the maxi single "So What!". The group released many singles and remixes as well as an EP and two albums during the life of the band. This included the song "Crash" which was co-written with Wayne Static of Static-X and "Some Kinda Freak" which was featured in the horror film Hostel.

== Biography ==
=== Inception and debut single (1993–1996) ===
Mephisto Odyssey was originally formed in the fall of 1993 by musician, songwriter / producer Mikael Johnston and producer / songwriter Michael Ames. Johnston's high school friend and fellow musician Orpheos Dejournette joined the group shortly after. The group's first single, the self-released "Dream of the Black Dahlia” (1993), earned kudos from Bay Area promoters and the international underground scene including DJ Garth of Greyhound Recordings who was the first international DJ to play the track. Ames left the group permanently after the release of their first single.

=== City of Angels (1996–1998) ===
Mephisto Odyssey now fronted by Johnston and Dejournette continued to release singles on their own label Mephisto Records until 1996 when they signed to the progressive West Coast label City of Angels. At City of Angels the group shared the talent roster with Überzone, Simply Jeff, Christopher Lawrence (DJ), Sandra Collins and future break beat kings, The Crystal Method. After a handful of singles and the release of their first album Catching The Skinny the then duo caught the ear of Warner Bros. Records A & R rep Troy Wallace. Wallace offered the duo the chance to work on a remix project with Jane's Addiction for the upcoming maxi single "So What!", Mephisto Odyssey co-produced the remixes with long-time friend and Primal Record Shop owner, Barrie Eves, who officially joined the group soon after. The official release featured 3 remixes by Mephisto Odyssey and went on to spend 6 weeks in the Billboard maxi singles chart which paved the way for a Warner Bros. Records recording contract (December 1998). DJ Josh Camacho also joined the group soon after the band signed to Warner Bros. as a touring member. To date Mephisto Odyssey are the only artists to officially remix Jane's Addiction.

=== The Warner Bros. Years (1998–2002) ===
While at Warner Bros. Records Mephisto Odyssey expanded further into the realm of engineering, producing and remixing by working with various artists sharing the roster. Mikael Johnston co-wrote, produced and engineered the single "Crash" with Wayne Static of Static-X which also appeared on the Static-X album Beneath... Between... Beyond... Mephisto Odyssey also appeared with Wayne Static and Koichi Fukuda in the song's video (directed by Len Wiseman), which aired in heavy rotation on MTVX. A Humble Brothers remix version of "Crash" was also featured on the soundtrack of Batman Beyond: Return of the Joker. Mephisto Odyssey did remixes for Los Amigos Invisibles "Mi Linda", Static-X's "Push It" and Soul Coughing's "Rolling" among others. An EP called The Lift which charted in the Billboard Hot Dance Club Play Chart, several singles and an album called The Deep Red Connection followed. A diverse array of guest vocalists appeared on the band's major label debut including Wayne Static, Hafdis Huld of Gus Gus, former 4ad artist Paula Frazer and Mad Lion. The group left Warner Bros. at the beginning of 2002 and disbanded.

=== Mephisto Odyssey reunite (2006–2008) ===
In 2006 founding member Mikael Johnston and DJ Josh Camacho reunited under the Mephisto Odyssey moniker to release several singles under their new Groove Quest label. Some of the singles released were "Superphonic" on N-mitysound Records, "Sexy Love" and "Bump." In 2008 Mikael Johnston put Mephisto Odyssey in moratorium to become one half of the music production team Dresden and Johnston with long-time friend Dave Dresden.

== Current work ==
In 2025, Mephisto Odyssey marked the 25th anniversary of their 2001 collaboration with Wayne Static with the release of "CRASH: Reborn (Falling Star Edition)." The release features a new mix and master of the original recording, previously unreleased vocal takes by Static, and additional guitar contributions from Brad Gillis, along with a music video incorporating newly shot 4K footage co-directed by Len Wiseman and William Instone.

The single was released on December 31, 2025, via digital platforms including YouTube and Bandcamp.

On February 5, 2026, the group released the official video for touring DJ Josh Camacho's "CRASH: Reborn – Camacho's Evil Club Remix" on the band's official YouTube channel.

On April 1, 2026, "CRASH: Reborn" surpassed one million views on YouTube.

In 1999, Mikael Johnston collaborated with Wayne Static on the "Crucified Dub" version of Static-X's "Push It" for the song's maxi-single release. The single was certified Gold by the Recording Industry Association of America (RIAA) on April 21, 2026. Johnston received a Gold plaque from Warner Music for his contributions to the single.

In May 2026, Mephisto Odyssey stated that Edsel Dope had attempted to prevent the release of "CRASH: Reborn".

== Discography ==
- Dream of the Black Dahlia (EP) 12" - Orpheos Productions 1994
- Dream of the Black Dahlia Remixes 12" - Mephisto Records through Hi-Bias 1994
- Dream of the Black Dahlia on Twitch Vol. 10 12" - Twitch Records 1994
- Catching the Skinny EP 12" - Mephisto Records through Hi-Bias 1994
- The Motive EP 12" - Mephisto Records 1995
- Transhumance feat. John Kozak - San Francisco Sound Spectrum (under the name Odyssey Arcane) 12" Twitch Records 1995
- The Tyburn Swing on RAW OXYGEN 5: Cool Neurotica 12" - Oxygen Music Works 1996
- Freak Lip Stomp, Dream of the Black Dahlia on Mephisto - The Subterranean Sounds of San Francisco 12" SSR/Crammed 1996
- Get Down (single) 12" - City of Angels Records - 1996
- Midntropolis (Single) 12" - City of Angels Records 1997
- Feterous Tripstride on The Sound of Young America 12" - City of Angels - 1997
- Catching the Skinny Album - City of Angels 1997
- Jane's Addiction - So What EP Mephisto Odyssey remixes 12" - Warner Bros. Records 1997
- Los Amigos Invisibles - Mi Linda Mephisto Odyssey Remixes 12" - Luaka Bop / WBR 1998
- Flow single (under the name Deep Red) 12" - Primal Trax / Warner Bros. Records 1999
- The Lift Remixes (EP) 12" Dbl Pack Primal Trax / Warner Bros. Records 2000
- The Deep Red Connection - Warner Bros. Records 2000
- Sexy Dancer (single) Hipp-E & Halo remix 12" - Primal Trax / Warner Bros. Records 2000
- Reach (single) feat Hafdis Huld 12" - Primal Trax / Warner Bros. Records 2000
- Killah (single) feat Jamalski 12" - Primal Trax / Warner Bros. Records 2001
- Some Kinda Freak (single) feat. Ultra Violet Catastrophe remix 12" - Primal Trax / Warner Bros. Records 2001
- Crash Video (Featuring Static-X, directed by Len Wiseman) - Warner Bros. Records 2001
- Rites of Passage (single) 12" - The Joint / Waako records 2004
