= Club Phusion =

American dance music radio station

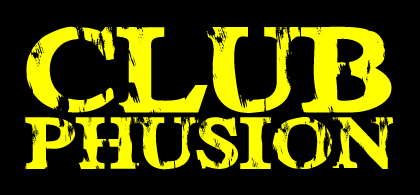
- Type: Radio network
- Country: United States
- Availability: National, through online and HD Radio affiliates (see stations)
- Owner: Clear Channel Communications
- Launch date: March 31, 2006
- Dissolved: March 31, 2013
- Official website: clubphusion.com

Club Phusion was a radio station on Clear Channel HD2's across the country that played commercial free dance music 24/7 from 2006 to 2013.

== History ==
Club Phusion was launched on March 31, 2006, over the subcarrier channel of Top 40 Mainstream KZCH/Wichita, Kansas. At the time, it was one of eight Dance-formatted stations being offered by the Format Lab, along with WiLD en Espanol, Trancid, Workout Channel, Pride Radio, KDWB's Party Zone, WFLZ's House Party and Classic Dance. Since then, WiLD en Espanol, Trancid, and Workout Channel have been eliminated, while WFLZ merged their formats with Club Phusion. Since June 2008, Club Phusion, Pride Radio and Classic Dance remain as the only Dance-formatted holdovers from the Format Lab, which since have been replaced by iHeartRadio. On August 19, 2010, Club Phusion was added to the channel line-up on iHeartRadio, allowing people with iPads, iPhones, Blackberries, and Androids to listen for free with the iHeartRadio app.

On November 19, 2012, the station was pulled on iheartradio.com in favor of a new pure Dance platform called "Evolution," but continued to be available on HD2 subchannels up until March 31, 2013. They claimed "in the 2 short years that Club Phusion has been on iHeartRadio, you helped us not only become the 4th most listened to digital station on iHeart, but we were consistently ranked in the top 25 of ALL stations on the platform, which is over 850+ stations."

== Programming ==
At the start, Club Phusion offered a heavily focused Top 40 playlist that was mostly made up of current Dance hits and Rhythmic/Pop remixes, along with some R&B/Hip-Hop, all commercial-free and jockless 24/7, but it has since been retooled into a Dance-focused approach. Even though they still feature current Rhythmic/Dance/Pop hits, there is now more emphasis on Club/Electronica product. The R&B/Hip-Hop elements have since been removed, thus allowing Club Phusion to become completely Pure Dance. Brian Fink, who resides at WFLZ/Tampa, Florida, was Program Director for Club Phusion.

== Stations ==
These stations used to carry Club Phusion on their HD2 subchannels. Some of these stations, like WVKS, now air "Evolution" on their side channels.

- KHYL in Sacramento
- KIBT in Colorado Springs, Colorado
- KPTT in Denver, Colorado
- WAKS in Cleveland
- WCHD in Englewood in Dayton, Ohio
- WKST in Pittsburgh
- WNOK in Columbia, South Carolina
- WQEN in Birmingham, Alabama
- WSNX in Grand Rapids, Michigan
- WVKS in Toledo, Ohio
- KBKS in Seattle, Washington
