= As the Rush Comes =

2004 single by Motorcycle

- US CD single artwork

Single by Motorcycle
- Released: January 5, 2004
- Recorded: San Francisco, California
- Length: 3:30 (radio edit)
- Label: Ultra
- Songwriters: Josh Gabriel; Dave Dresden; Jes Brieden
- Producer: Gabriel & Dresden

Motorcycle singles chronology
"As the Rush Comes" (2004)	"Around You" (2004)

Music video
- "As The Rush Comes" on YouTube

"As the Rush Comes" is a song by American progressive house group Motorcycle. It was released as the group's debut single in January 2004 and topped the US Billboard Dance Radio Airplay chart that March, ending the year as the most-played song on dance radio. Additionally, the song became a transatlantic hit, peaking at number 11 in the United Kingdom and reaching the top 20 in Finland, Flanders, and the Netherlands.

== Background ==
There are several remixes of "As the Rush Comes", such as the "Chillout Remix" made by Gabriel & Dresden plus remixes by British trance group Above & Beyond and Dutch trance DJ Armin van Buuren. Many of these remixes were included on singles issued in the United States and United Kingdom. In 2003, the track was voted Tune of the Year on Armin van Buuren's radio show A State of Trance.

Jes, Josh and I spent a weekend together laying down the tracks. [It] was written and recorded in one day.

— Dave Dresden.

== Content ==
According to Jes, the lyrics were written from a very personal perspective. She described the song as being about "those fleeting moments when you let yourself go completely — when you feel most alive". Gabriel & Dresden built the instrumental bed around her topline, favoring a slower BPM and more atmospheric arrangement than typical trance tracks of the early 2000s.

== Critical reception ==
TranceCritic noted its "minimal but hypnotic" production and highlighted Jes’s vocal as "achingly beautiful", arguing that the stripped-back style distinguished it from other trance releases of the time. We Rave You described the single as a "mesmerizing classic" whose emotional resonance has endured for over two decades. DJ Mag has also ranked it among the standout trance records of the 2000s, citing its "timeless atmosphere and crossover appeal."

== Track listings ==
US 12-inch single

A. "As the Rush Comes" (Gabriel & Dresden Sweeping Strings remix)
B. "As the Rush Comes" (Armin van Buuren's Universal Religion remix)

US CD single

1. "As the Rush Comes" (Gabriel & Dresden radio edit)
2. "As the Rush Comes" (Gabriel & Dresden Sweeping Strings remix)
3. "As the Rush Comes" (Armin van Buuren's Universal Religion remix)

US digital EP

1. "As the Rush Comes" (radio edit)
2. "As the Rush Comes" (EnMass Breaks mix radio edit)
3. "As the Rush Comes" (Gabriel & Dresden Sweeping Strings remix)
4. "As the Rush Comes" (Armin van Buuren's Universal Religion remix)
5. "As the Rush Comes" (Markus Schulz Coldharbour remix)
6. "As the Rush Comes" (Above & Beyond's Dynaglide mix)
7. "As the Rush Comes" (EnMass Breaks mix)
8. "As the Rush Comes" (Gabriel & Dresden Chillout remix)

UK 12-inch single 1

A. "As the Rush Comes" (Gabriel & Dresden Sweeping Strings remix) – 10:46
B. "As the Rush Comes" (Markus Schulz Coldharbour remix) – 11:45

UK 12-inch single 2

A. "As the Rush Comes" (Armin van Buuren's Universal Religion remix) – 9:54
B. "As the Rush Comes" (Above & Beyond's Dynaglide mix) – 8:40

UK CD single

1. "As the Rush Comes" (radio edit) – 3:30
2. "As the Rush Comes" (Gabriel & Dresden Sweeping Strings remix) – 10:46
3. "As the Rush Comes" (Armin van Buuren's Universal Religion remix) – 9:54
4. "As the Rush Comes" (Above & Beyond's Dynaglide mix) – 8:40
5. "As the Rush Comes" (Gabriel & Dresden Chillout remix) – 6:24
6. "As the Rush Comes" (enhanced video)

Dutch maxi-CD single

1. "As the Rush Comes" (original radio edit)
2. "As the Rush Comes" (Armin van Buuren's Universal radio mix)
3. "As the Rush Comes" (Markus Schulz Coldharbour remix)
4. "As the Rush Comes" (Gabriel & Dresden Sweeping Strings remix)
5. "As the Rush Comes" (Armin van Buuren's Universal Religion remix)
6. "As the Rush Comes" (Gabriel & Dresden Chillout remix)

== Charts ==
=== Weekly charts ===
Chart (2004)	Peak position
Belgium (Ultratop 50 Flanders)	12
Belgium (Ultratip Bubbling Under Wallonia)	9
Belgium Dance (Ultratop Flanders)	1
Finland (Suomen virallinen lista)	8
Hungary (Dance Top 40)	26
Ireland (IRMA)	35
Ireland Dance (IRMA)	2
Netherlands (Dutch Top 40)	9
Netherlands (Single Top 100)	15
Scottish Singles Sales (Official Charts)	9
UK Singles (Official Charts)	11
UK Dance (Official Charts)	2
US Dance Club Songs (Billboard)	41
US Dance Singles Sales (Billboard)	13
US Dance Airplay (Billboard)	1

=== Year-end charts ===
Chart (2004)	Position
Belgium (Ultratop 50 Flanders)	88
Netherlands (Dutch Top 40)	71
UK Singles (OCC)	170
US Dance Radio Airplay (Billboard)	1

== Certifications ==
Region	Certification	Certified units/sales
United Kingdom (BPI)	Silver	200,000^{‡}
^{‡} Sales+streaming figures based on certification alone.

== Release history ==
Region	Date	Format(s)	Label(s)	Ref.
United Kingdom	January 5, 2004	12-inch vinyl; CD	Positiva	
United States	April 6, 2004	Digital EP	Ultra	
