= I Am the World Trade Center =

American synthpop duo

- Origin: New York City, United States
- Genres: Synthpop, indietronica
- Years active: 1999–2006
- Labels: Kindercore, Gammon
- Members: Daniel Geller; Amy Dykes
- Website: www.iamtheworldtradecenter.com

I Am the World Trade Center was an American synthpop duo consisting of musician Daniel Geller (co-founder of Kindercore Records) and vocalist Amy Dykes. Geller creates almost all of the music using his laptop, occasionally using drum machines, keyboards, or other instruments.

== History ==
Geller co-founded Kindercore Records with Ryan Lewis in 1996 in Athens, Georgia, United States. Lewis, Geller, and Dykes soon moved to New York City, and Geller and Dykes began dating in 1997. When Geller asked Dykes to provide the vocals for an instrumental track he had written, they considered starting a band. With encouragement from Lewis, they played a live performance in Austin, Texas, at the 2000 South by Southwest festival.

Geller and Dykes had decided on the name in 1999 while living in New York City. The band's debut album, Out of the Loop, was released in 2001 on the Kindercore label and according to a 2002 interview with The Stanford Daily, the band's name represented the dynamic of the duo's relationship: "The two towers, equal and independent, together made up one entity and came to represent the relationship that Geller and Dykes forged professionally and personally." The duo's second album, The Tight Connection, was also released on Kindercore in 2002. After Kindercore folded, their third album, The Cover Up, was released on Gammon Records. Dykes and Geller were no longer involved romantically by that time, but they continue to collaborate professionally.

=== 9/11 ===
After the September 11, 2001 attacks, which destroyed the original World Trade Center complex, I Am the World Trade Center toured briefly under the shortened name "I Am the World...", but resumed playing under their original name.

=== Health problems ===
In April 2004, Dykes was diagnosed with Hodgkin's lymphoma. Dykes underwent chemotherapy and faced several complications, but her cancer went into remission in late 2004, they attempted another tour in 2005 but were forced to end it early when Dykes again had to be hospitalized, this time after contracting pneumonia. The band was further sidelined when Kindercore became involved in a lawsuit which tied up the label (and Geller) through mid-late 2007. Although they had planned to record a fourth album, The Cover Up was ultimately the band's final release.

== Discography ==
- Out of the Loop (2001)
- The Tight Connection (2002)
- The Cover Up (2004)
