= Agnelli & Nelson =

Northern Irish producers

- Origin: Belfast, Northern Ireland
- Genres: Trance
- Years active: 1997–active
- Labels: Vandit
- Members: Christoper James Agnew; Robert Frederick Nelson
- Website: Agnelliandnelson.com/

Agnelli & Nelson are a Northern Irish trance and electronic music DJ duo, making up of producers Christoper James Agnew and Robert Frederick Nelson. Active since 1997, they also produced music under the names Afterburn, Cortez, Green Atlas, Quincey & Sonance and The A&N Project.

== Biography ==
Agnew and Nelson have written and produced dance music, including their hits "El Nino" and "Everyday". They have to date produced five Top 40 hits in the United Kingdom, and countless remixes, from Armin van Buuren to U2.

The pair have collaborated with other major artists, including Matt Darey, Jon the Dentist, Scott Bond, Solarstone, and Chicane. They have also appeared on BBC Radio 1 six times. They produced music for Xtravaganza, and labels such as Tsunami Records and ID&T.

Their remix of John O'Callaghan's "Big Sky" was voted the number one trance production on A State of Trance in 2007, the radio show hosted by Armin Van Buuren.

== Discography ==
=== Singles ===
==== As Agnelli & Nelson ====
- 1998 – "Angels Fly/Bolivian Angel" [RGB]
- 1998 – "Angels 1998" [RGB]
- 1998 – "El Nino" [Xtravaganza] (UK #21)
- 1999 – "Everyday" [Xtravaganza] (UK #17) (released as "Every Day, Every Moment, Every Time" outside the UK)
- 2000 – "Embrace" [Xtravaganza] (UK #35)
- 2000 – "Hudson St." [Xtravaganza] (UK #29)
- 2001 – "Vegas" [Xtravaganza] (UK #48)
- 2002 – "Everyday" (re-mix), [Xtravaganza] (UK #33)
- 2004 – "Holding Onto Nothing" (featuring Audrey Gallagher), [Xtravaganza] (UK #41), Vandit (Germany)
- 2005 – "Shivver" [Xtravaganza]

==== As The A & N Project ====
- 2007 "Wear That Dress" [Deep Blue Records]
- 2008 "Just When I Think There's An Answer" [Deep Blue Records]
- 2008 "Sleeping In Airports" [Coldharbour Recordings]
- 2013 "Quest" [Subculture]
- 2013 "New Light" [Subculture]

==== As Afterburn ====
- 2000 – "North Pole/Fratt Boy" [Xtravaganza]
- 2003 – "Summer Sun" [Tsunami]

==== As Cortez ====
- 2000 – "Über Den Wolken" [Frauenfunk Schallplatten]
- 2003 – "Scaramanga/The Force" (Feat. Fergie) [ID&T]

==== As Green Atlas ====
- 2004 – "Circulation" [Tatsumaki]
- 2004 – "Communicate" [Tatsumaki]

=== Remixes ===
==== As Agnelli & Nelson ====
- 1999 Manya – "Let Me Be" [RGB]
- 2000 Liquid – "Orlando Dawn" [Xtravaganza]
- 2000 Louise – "2 Faced" [EMI]
- 2000 Lange – "Follow Me" [Positiva]
- 2000 Ruff Driverz – "Chosen Ones" [EMI]
- 2001 Midas – "Fire In The Sky" [Credance]
- 2002 Sipping Soma – "Superconscious (So Alive)" [RGB]
- 2003 Fusion Feat. Matt Hardwick – "Spectrum" [JOOF]
- 2003 Rio Klein – "Fearless" [Nettwerk]
- 2003 Slipmatt – "Space" [Concept]
- 2004 Solar Stone vs. Scott Bond – "3rd Earth" [Made In England]
- 2004 Chicane ft. Bryan Adams – "Don"t Give Up 2004" [Xtravaganza]
- 2004 Ferry Corsten – "Its Time" [Tsunami + Positiva]
- 2004 Armin Van Buuren – "Blue Fear 2004" [Nebula & Armada]
- 2004 Jon The Dentist – "Gobal Phazes" [Duty Free]
- 2004 Classified project – "Starlight Chaser" [Mondo]
- 2004 Li Kwan (Matt Darey) – "Point Zero 2004" [Darey Products LTD]
- 2005 Alex Gold – "Stranded In Paradise" [Xtravaganza]
- 2005 Alex Gold – "Back From A Break (Better Dayz)" [Xtravaganza]
- 2007 John O"Callaghan ft. Audrey Gallagher – "Big Sky" [Armind]
- 2008 Agnelli & Nelson pres. The A & N Project – "Just When I Think There's An Answer" [Deepblue]
- 2008 Markus Schulz ft. Dauby – "Perfect" [Coldharbour Recordings]
- 2008 Solarstone – "Rain Stars Eternal" [Solaris Recordings]
- 2013 Andain - "You Once Told Me" [Black Hole]
- 2014 Andain - "You Once Told Me" (Agnelli & Nelson 138 Edit) [Black Hole]

==== As Quincey & Sonance ====
- 1997 Tecnogue – "Abha Na Séad" [Lime Recordings]
- 1997 CJ Agnelli – "Lush" [Freerange]
- 2000 U2 – "Beautiful Day" [Island]
- 2001 U2 – "Elevation" [Island]

==== As Afterburn ====
- 2004 Bossanova – "Stonecold" [Tatsumaki]

=== Album ===
==== As Agnelli & Nelson ====
- Hudson Street, Xtravaganza
