= Bloom (Gabriel & Dresden album) =

Compilation album by Gabriel & Dresden and various artists
- Released: September 7, 2004 (U.S.)
- Label: Nettwerk
- Producer: Gabriel & Dresden

Bloom is a compilation album by the American electronic music duo Gabriel & Dresden, released in 2004. The album collects songs by the duo and various other artists from the Nettwerk label. The first three tracks were originally featured on the EP Arcadia.

== Track listing ==
Disc one
No.	Title	Artist	Length
1.	"Arcadia"	Gabriel & Dresden	8:28
2.	"Serendipity"	Gabriel & Dresden	8:13
3.	"Lament"	Gabriel & Dresden	8:14
4.	"Here Is the House"	Andain	4:52
5.	"Forwards"	Michael Burns	7:43
6.	"World on Fire" (Junkie XL club mix)	Sarah McLachlan	10:01
7.	"External Key"	Audioholics	4:25
8.	"Someone Else"	Voyager	4:38
9.	"Dub Horizon"	Gabriel & Dresden	6:58
10.	"Cronch"	Ferenc	5:45
11.	"Stoppage Time"	Guy Gerber	9:56

Disc two
No.	Title	Artist	Length
1.	"Voices"	Pass into Silence	1:58
2.	"Athena"	Elevation, Gabriel & Dresden	4:55
3.	"Anything" (Gabriel & Dresden Code 313 dub)	Lili Haydn	6:48
4.	"Nova Satori" (Josh Gabriel mix)	RND	6:00
5.	"Don't Leave Home" (Gabriel & Dresden mix)	Dido	10:52
6.	"Sub"	Bigtop	6:14
7.	"No One On Earth" (Gabriel & Dresden mix)	Above & Beyond	9:02
8.	"Alive" (original mix)	Josh Gabriel	8:17
9.	"Switch"	Josh Gabriel	5:54
10.	"Totally Fascinated" (M.I.K.E.'s Fascinated mix)	M.I.K.E. pres. Fascinated	9:35
11.	"Imagination" (acoustic)	Motorcycle	2:49

=== Notes ===
- "External Key" contains a cappella from Andain's "Beautiful Things".
- "Someone Else" contains a cappella from Motorcycle's "As The Rush Comes".
- "Nova Satori" (Josh Gabriel mix) title written on release as "Nova Santori" (Josh Gabriel mix).
- "Totally Fascinated" (M.I.K.E.'s Fascinated mix) is mislabeled on the CD's track list as "Electric Eclipse" by Push.

== Personnel ==
- Little C – artwork design
- Gabriel & Dresden – DJ mix
- Rick Essig – mastering
- Jason Hull – cover photography

=== Disc one ===
- Dave Dresden – songwriting on 1–3, 9, production on 3, 4, 9
- Josh Gabriel – songwriting on 1–3, 9, production on 3, 4, 9, engineering on 3
- David Gropper and Martin Gore – songwriting on 4
- Andain – production on 4
- Michael Burns – songwriting, vocals on 5
- Pierre Marchand – songwriting, production, engineering, mixing on 6
- Sarah McLachlan – songwriting on 6
- David Westerlund, Özgür Can – songwriting, production on 7
- Justin Scott Dixon – songwriting, production on 8
- Autan and Fra Soler – songwriting on 10
- Guy Gerber – songwriting, production on 11

=== Disc two ===
- Dave Dresden – songwriting, production on 2, 6, 11
- Josh Gabriel – songwriting, production on 2, 6, 8, 9, 11
- Tetsuo Sakae – songwriting on 1
- Michael Targanaski – songwriting, production on 2
- Lili Haydn – songwriting, production on 3
- Peter Rafelson – songwriting on 3
- Bill Laswell – production on 3
- Robert Palazuelos – songwriting, production on 4
- David Gropper – production on 4
- Dido Armstrong, Rollo Armstrong – songwriting, production on 5
- Peter Houser – songwriting on 6
- Bassbin Twins – production on 6
- Zoë Johnston – vocals, songwriting on 7
- Jono Grant, Paavo Siljamäki, Tony McGuinness – songwriting on 7
- Above & Beyond – production on 7
- Rowan Gabriel – fetal heartbeat on 8
- Kristy Gabriel – additional vocals on 8
- M.I.K.E. – songwriting, production on 10
- Jes Brieden – songwriting on 11

== Reviews ==
These guys are certainly the men of the moment. Their production is second to none.

— M8

…America’s most in-demand re-mix team…

— DJ Times

High performance…

— BPM

…when we say you haven’t heard them yet, it’s about time you do.

— Loft
