= Third Earth =

Third Earth may refer to:

- A fictional planet in the ThunderCats franchise
- A fictional territory in the Pendragon series
- "3rd Earth" (alternatively spelled "Third Earth"), a 2003 song by Scott Bond and Solarstone
