= Ayla (musician) =

German trance producer and DJ

- Also known as: DJ Tandu, Anakin, Drop In, Montoya, Tan 2
- Born: Ingo Kunzi; 7 November 1966 (age 59)
- Origin: State of Baden-Württemberg, Germany
- Genres: Trance
- Occupations: Electronic musician, record producer, songwriter, remixer, DJ
- Years active: 1993–present
- Labels: Maddog; Unsubmissive Records; Positiva Records; Additive; NoYu Records
- Website: www.tandu.de

Ingo Kunzi (born 7 November 1966) is a German trance producer and DJ, best known for his work under his recording names Ayla and Tandu. The Ayla name was inspired by the name of a girl in the recording studio during his first Ayla recording. Kunzi is also related to other projects including Karuma, Elastique Culture, Tarot and Intrance.

== Career ==
Ingo Kunzi was born in 1966 in Baden-Württemberg, Germany. Influenced by the likes of Supertramp and Pat Metheny, he started out in the rock scene, building his own studio in 1985 and engineering demos for rock bands before discovering electronic music via the likes of Cosmic Baby and Talla 2XLC's Moskwa TV project. In 1994, Kunzi launched his DJ Tandu alias with the Acido EP, his first foray into full-on trance, with a hard, psychedelic sound. His second project, Ayla, was created in 1995 along with the single of the same name: the track "Ayla" (1996) became a hit in the clubs and entered the UK Singles Chart at #22 in September 1999. After "Ayla's" success, Kunzi produced "Atlantis", "Ayla Part II" and "Liebe", which is a cover of the Cosmic Baby classic.

Ayla's fifth single, "Angelfalls", was released in 1999, reaching the top 3 of the German dance chart. In the same year, Ayla released his first album, Nirwana, which peaked at number 4 in the Norwegian Charts. His remix of Lange's "I Believe", which was released under the name DJ Tandu, was included in the first installment of Tiësto's popular series In Search of Sunrise as well as in Gatecrasher Wet, the third compilation album by Sheffield-based club Gatecrasher. Kunzi went on to produce two more Ayla tracks ("Singularity / Brainchild II", "Sun Is Coming Out"), before taking a break on the project in 2002. He has also co-produced for several known successful electronic acts such as Safri Duo and DJ Encore.

After putting his Ayla project on hiatus for many years, Kunzi released the digital single, "Ayla 2010", in 2010. On 23 February 2011, the second Ayla studio album, Unreleased Secrets, was released. Together with friends and colleagues Torsten Stenzel (York) and Ralph-Armand Beck (DJ Taucher), Ingo – as Ayla – released two singles in 2015 'Kings & Queens' and 'Free Yourself'.

In 2018 Ingo released his debut Tandu album 'Faces', a collaboration with long-term friend and colleague Ralph-Armand Beck (aka. Taucher).

2023 Ayla featured on the international hit single 'Car Keys (Ayla)', a hit dance-pop single created by Brazilian DJ Alok and American pop singer Ava Max. The song prominently samples Ayla's 1996 trance hit "Ayla", specifically the 1997 released Taucher remix.

== Discography ==
=== As Ayla ===
==== Studio albums ====
- 1999 – Nirwana
- 2011 – Unreleased Secrets

==== Singles & EPs ====
- 1996 – Ayla
- 1996 – Atlantis
- 1998 – Ayla Part II
- 1998 – Liebe
- 1999 – Angelfalls
- 1999 – Into The Light
- 2000 – Singularity (Brainchild II)
- 2002 – Sun Is Coming Out (with Yel)
- 2004 – Eternity (with Orion)
- 2015 – Kings & Queens (with YORK & Taucher)
- 2015 – Free Yourself (with YORK & Taucher)
- 2023 – Car Keys (Ayla) (with Ava Max & Alok)
- 2023 – Car Keys (Ayla) (Remixes) (with Ava Max & Alok)
- 2025 – Left On Our Own (with YORK & Nelly TGM)

==== Remixes ====
- 1998 – DJ Sakin & Friends – Protect Your Mind (For the Love of a Princess) (Ayla Remix)
- 1999 – Schiller – Ruhe (Ayla Mix)
- 1999 – Pearls – When Winter Calls... (Ayla Remix)
- 1999 – Watergate – Chi Mai (Ayla Remix)
- 1999 – Malatya 44 – Wonderland (Ayla Mix)
- 2000 – U:Phonics – Running (Ayla's Particular Beach Remix)
- 2000 – DJ Tandu Presents Ayla – Singularity (Brainchild II) (Ayla's Club Mix)
- 2000 – DJ Piero – I Can't Stop Lovin' You (Ayla Remix)
- 2000 – Degeneration – Una Musica Senza Ritmo 2000 (Ayla Remix)
- 2001 – Schiller Mit Heppner – Dream Of You (Ayla Mischung)
- 2001 – Orion – Eternity (Ayla Mix)
- 2002 – Ayla Presents Yel – Sun Is Coming Out (Ayla's Uplifting Mix)
- 2003 – Hiver & Hammer – 5 Million Miles (Ayla Remix)
- 2005 – DJ's United For Asia – Broken Dreams (Ayla Remix)
- 2010 – Ayla – Ayla 2010 (Ayla 2010 Mix)
- 2026 – U:Phonics – Sky High (Ayla Remix)

=== As Tandu ===
==== Studio albums ====
- 2018 – Faces (with Taucher)

==== Singles & EPs ====
- 1994 – Acido EP
- 1994 – Beridox (with Trex)
- 1997 – The Marillion (with Karuma)
- 1998 – Back!
- 1999 – Velvet / Don't You Fool Me Now
- 2000 – Singularity (Brainchild II)
- 2000 – On Y Va (with DJ Mind-X & Karuma)
- 2004 – Mansonate (with Taucher)
- 2005 – Turn It Around Baby (with Niels Van Gogh)
- 2009 – Firedance (with Mike Mash)
- 2014 – Addicted To You (with McLoud)
- 2025 – Angelfalls (with Talla 2XLC)
- 2025 – OnYVa (FrOstic Mix) (with Mind-X & Allan McLoud)
- 2026 – The Marillion (with Talla 2XLC)

==== Remixes ====
- 1995 – Pan & Trex – Iceman On The Beach (Tandu Remix)
- 1997 – DJ Pascal Dollé – Thunderstorm (...Paranoia Around My Brain...) (Club Mix) (remix by Tandu)
- 1997 – Delgado – Feel The Bass Pumpin' (Tandu Remix)
- 1998 – Pathfinder – Mars (Tandu Remix)
- 1998 – Elastique Culture – La Muzika (DJ Tandu Remix)
- 1998 – Marino Stephano – Eternal Rhapsody (DJ Tandu Remix)
- 1998 – A.M.C. – Nippon Nippel II (DJ Tandu Remix)
- 1999 – Mosquito Headz – El Ritmo (Tandu Mix)
- 1999 – Ayla – Ayla (Tandu Remix)
- 1999 – Lange – I Believe (DJ Tandu Mix)
- 1999 – Pulp Victim – The World 99 (DJ Tandu Remix)
- 1999 – Mythos 'N DJ Cosmo – Send Me An Angel (Tandu Remix)
- 1999 – Andora – Blade Runner (Tandu Remix)
- 1999 – DJ Mind-X – Nightingale (Tandu Remix)
- 1999 – Minimalism – For My Love (Tandu Mix)
- 1999 – Rise & Shine – Hungry Animal (Tandu Remix)
- 1999 – The Highlander – Emotional Overload (Dj Tandu Original 95 Mix)
- 1999 – DJ D.O.C. – Entspannungstherapie (DJ Tandu & Allan McLoud Therapie)
- 2000 – DJ ELB – Relieve My Pain (Dj Tandu & Allan Mc Loud Remix)
- 2000 – Encore – Le Soleil Noir (Tandu~McLoud Remix)
- 2000 – Kai Tracid – Destiny's Path (Tandu Remix)
- 2000 – Voyager – On A Mission (DJ Tandu & Allan McLoud Remix)
- 2000 – The Untamed – Innocent Child (Tandu Remix)
- 2000 – S-Project – Julika (Feelings Like In Paradise)(Tandu~McLoud Remix)
- 2000 – Elastique Culture – U (Dj Tandu Mix)
- 2000 – Safri Duo – Played-A-Live (The Bongo Song)(Dj Tandu Mix)
- 2001 – Mario De Bellis – City Lights (Tandu Remix)
- 2001 – DJ Tatana & DJ Energy – Feel (DJ Tandu Progressive Mix)
- 2001 – Infernal – Muzaik (Tandu Remix)
- 2001 – DJ Encore feat. Engelina – I See Right Through To You (Tandu Mix)
- 2001 – Neo Cortex – Prepare (DJ Tandu Remix)
- 2001 – Future Breeze – Mind In Motion (Tandu Remix)
- 2001 – DJ Delgado – Feel The Bass Pumpin'(DJ Tandu Mix)
- 2001 – Polar Lander – Polar Lander (Tandu & Mc Loud Remix)
- 2001 – Shine – Feelings (DJ Tandu Remix)
- 2002 – G.U.M. – This Is Not A Lovesong (Tandu Remix)
- 2002 – Matanka – Lost In A Dream (2002) (DJ Tandu Remix)
- 2002 – Catch – Keep On (Singing Lala) (DJ Tandu Remix)
- 2002 – DJ Aligator Project – Stomp! (Tandu Remix)
- 2003 – Ayla presents Yel – Sun is Coming Out (Tandu's UK Dub)
- 2003 – Wellenrausch – On The Run (Tandu meets Andy B. Remix)
- 2003 – Laze – Steppin' Out (Tandu Remix)
- 2003 – DJ Quicksilver – Equinoxe IV (Tandu Remix)
- 2004 – Marie Miller – Tell Me (DJ Tandu Remix)
- 2004 – Marie Miller – Playground (DJ Tandu Remix)
- 2005 – Marie Miller – Can't Slow Down (Tandu Remix)
- 2009 – Soulcry – A Life So Changed Part II (DJ Tandu Remix)
- 2009 – Michael Parsberg – Naked In The Rain (Tandu & Mike Mash Remix)
- 2014 – Dito – Shadows (Tandu's Good Old Days Remix)
- ? – Fabuland – Space Trash (Tandu Remix)

==== DJ Mixes ====
- 2000 – Academy of Trance: Club Gorgeous.dk Vol. 2
- 2001 – Techno Club Vol. 13 (with Talla 2XLC)
