= You Once Told Me =

Studio album by Andain
- Released: September 24, 2012
- Genre: Electronica
- Length: 60:25
- Language: English
- Label: Black Hole
- Producers: Josh Gabriel, Mavie Marcos

Singles from You Once Told Me
- 1. "Promises" Released: June 6, 2011; 2. "Much Too Much" Released: January 30, 2012; 3. "Turn Up the Sound" Released: June 18, 2012; 4. "What It's Like" Released: January 14, 2013

You Once Told Me is the first officially released studio album from Andain, succeeding 10 years of various works and performances.

== Overview ==
Released on September 24, 2012, through Black Hole, You Once Told Me had been written over a span of four years, from 2007 to 2011. (Note: Writing started by the end of 2006, with the first bulk of songs done during 2007. The album was handed in to the label in early April 2011.) The album was promoted with three singles prior to its release, starting with "Promises" in June 2011, "Much Too Much" by the end of January 2012, and "Turn Up the Sound" on June 18, 2012. After much patience following unsettled circumstances, the album was officially announced on August 10, 2012, on Andain's official Facebook page. With a complementary note about album previews to come the following week, a teaser of the album track "Like" was posted on Facebook, on August 17, 2012. Soon after, an official album preview was exclusively announced to readers of the online promotion portal Beatsmedia, which was made available on August 21, 2012, through Andain's official SoundCloud page. The announcement also included an exclusive video message from Mavie, where she shares a few words about the album, including the meaning behind the chosen title.

...it's about words and the meaning of words, and how they change over time, as we as people can change over time.

— Mavie Marcos

With a track list of eleven songs, the album revolves around a style of hybrid electronica with acoustic elements and slight influences from rock music. Some songs lean more towards one direction than the other, where for instance "Like" and "Ave Maria" are more based around electronic sounds, while "After" and "What It's Like" are significantly characterised by electric guitar and acoustic percussion instruments. At the same time, the album was also written with an intent to maintain a sense of overall coherency, keeping the selection of instruments consistent between the tracks. Mavie's vocal performances permeate throughout the album with emotive and soulful lyrics, colouring each track with varying levels of vocal harmonics, also reflecting upon Mavie's choral background and love for harmonization.

== Deluxe Version ==
In addition to the standard physical and digital formats, You Once Told Me was also released as an exclusive iTunes LP Deluxe Version. In addition to the content presented with the physical pressing, the interactive version also featured bonus material, including the original version of "Summer Calling"; the Gabriel & Dresden remix of "Beautiful Things"; six additional remixes taken from the three promotional singles, including an exclusive remix of "Promises" by Jaytech; the three music videos from the respective singles; exclusive artwork; and photos from the making of the different music videos. (Note: For the complete Deluxe Version track list, see the album profile on iTunes; for additional content, see the official video preview on YouTube.)

== Bonus tracks ==
Aside from the Deluxe Version, additional bonus tracks were also offered with the digital release from select retailers. For the Beatport release, two additional remixes of "Promises" by Jaytech and Maor Levi were added as bonus tracks. Alternatively, Amazon.com offered three of the bonus tracks from the Deluxe Version, including KOAN Sound's remix of "Promises", Rido's remix of "Much Too Much", and Stratus' remix of "Turn Up the Sound".

== Track listing ==
You Once Told Me
No.	Title	Co-writer(s)	Length
1.	"Turn Up the Sound"	Dave Dresden	5:46
2.	"Like"	Dave Dresden	5:54
3.	"Much Too Much"	Dave Dresden	5:00
4.	"Ave Maria"	David Penner	4:30
5.	"Promises"	Dave Dresden, David Penner	6:17
6.	"After"	Dave Dresden	4:40
7.	"What It's Like"	Dave Dresden	6:00
8.	"Forget Your Face"	Dave Dresden	5:24
9.	"Find Your Way"	Dave Dresden	5:56
10.	"You Once Told Me"	David Penner	5:14
11.	"Taken Away"	Dave Dresden	5:44

Total length:	60:25

iTunes LP Deluxe Version

No.	Title	Co-writer(s)	Remixer(s)	Length
12.	"Summer Calling"	David Penner		4:39
13.	"Beautiful Things - Gabriel & Dresden's Unplugged Mix"	David Penner	Gabriel & Dresden	10:45
14.	"Promises - KOAN Sound Remix"	Dave Dresden, David Penner	KOAN Sound	3:59
15.	"Promises - Jaytech Remix"	Dave Dresden, David Penner	Jaytech	5:52
16.	"Much Too Much - Zetandel Chill Remix"	Dave Dresden	Zetandel	4:29
17.	"Much Too Much - Rido Remix"	Dave Dresden	Rido	4:32
18.	"Turn Up the Sound - Gabriel & Dresden Remix"	Dave Dresden	Gabriel & Dresden	7:24
19.	"Turn Up the Sound - Stratus Remix"	Dave Dresden	Stratus	3:19
Video	"Promises"			4:00
Video	"Much Too Much"			4:18
Video	"Turn Up the Sound"			4:19

Total length:	118:01

Amazon bonus tracks

No.	Title	Co-writer(s)	Remixer(s)	Length
12.	"Promises - KOAN Sound Remix"	Dave Dresden, David Penner	KOAN Sound	3:59
13.	"Much Too Much - Rido Remix"	Dave Dresden	Rido	4:32
14.	"Turn Up the Sound - Stratus Remix"	Dave Dresden	Stratus	3:19

Total length:	72:15

Beatport bonus tracks

No.	Title	Co-writer(s)	Remixer(s)	Length
12.	"Promises - Jaytech Remix"	Dave Dresden, David Penner	Jaytech	5:52
13.	"Promises - Maor Levi's Analog Emotion Remix"	Dave Dresden, David Penner	Maor Levi	7:52

Total length:	74:09

== Credits and personnel ==
All songs written and produced by Josh Gabriel and Mavie Marcos. Additional writing by Dave Dresden on tracks 1–3, 5–9, and 11 (plus 13 on Deluxe Version), and David Penner on tracks 4, 5 and 10 (plus 12 and 13 on Deluxe Version). (Note: For You Once Told Me writing credits, see the album's profile at Allmusic. For "Summer Calling" writing credits, see the song's profile at Discogs. For "Beautiful Things" writing credits, see the song's profile at Discogs.)
