= Promises (Andain song) =

Single by Andain

from the album You Once Told Me
- Released: June 6, 2011
- Genre: Downtempo, progressive trance, progressive house, dubstep
- Label: Black Hole
- Songwriters: Josh Gabriel, Mavie Marcos, Dave Dresden, David Penner
- Producers: Josh Gabriel, Mavie Marcos

Andain singles chronology
"Beautiful Things" (2003)	"Promises" (2011)	"Much Too Much" (2012)

Music video
- "Promises" on YouTube

Audio sample
- "Promises - Radio Edit": file; help

"Promises" is the third single from Andain, and remarks a comeback after eight years since their previous release. It's also the first promotional single taken from the duo's debut album, You Once Told Me.

== Overview ==
The song made its debut on YouTube with the première of its official music video, posted by Black Hole on June 1, 2011. The single followed on June 6, 2011, as two exclusive digital releases: a five track remix EP on Beatport, and a three track single on iTunes, featuring the album version of the song. A follow-up remix EP with additional remixes was released on June 13, 2011.

Prior to its release, "Promises" received promotional support from a selected crew of DJs, being featured in live sets, podcasts and radio shows in the form of various remixes. Particularly "Mÿon and Shane 54's Summer of Love Mix" was well received, gaining the status Future Favourite on Armin van Buuren's radio show "A State of Trance" – ultimately making it to "A State of Trance Radio Top 20 of 2011", ranking 11th. The remix also peaked at the number one position on Beatport's Trance chart for over six weeks, while "Gabriel & Dresden Remix" reached number three. The latter remix was also selected as Record of the Week for Above & Beyond's radio show "Trance Around the World", episode #372. Both remixes were eventually posted on YouTube by Black Hole, including "Nitrous Oxide Remix", while "Marco V Remix" was added shortly after the première of the official music video.

On February 1, 2012, "Promises" was announced to be one of Black Hole's nominations for the International Dance Music Awards 2012. The song was nominated for Best Chillout/Lounge Track and Best Trance Track; although, no specific remix was noted for the latter category.

== Music video ==
The music video was directed and produced by Wylie Maercklein and shot in Bolinas, CA. Set by a rocky shore, it features Mavie performing the song, in conjunction with scenery of the surrounding landscape. It also features a special instrument built exclusively for the set, which takes the appearance of a piano fused with a phonograph and a music box.

While the prominent focus is set on Mavie playing the instrument and singing, the video also features a cameo by Josh, who is seen winding the music box element of the instrument.

== "Everything from Me" ==
Before the single was being promoted, an earlier version of the song was released as a remix by Richard Durand. Titled "Everything from Me", the song made its appearance on Durand's album Wide Awake, released on March 14, 2011. The song has different verses and was intended to be a teaser prior to the release of "Promises". Notably, some of the remixes still carry an imprint from the earlier version, either by chord progression or the presence of vocal parts that are absent in the final version.

== Piano version ==
On February 2, 2012, Andain published a video recording of a live performance of "Promises" on YouTube. The video features Mavie singing and playing an original piano arrangement of the song, with a slight touch of electronic sound processing.

== Official versions ==
- "Promises - Album Version" – 06:35
- "Promises - KOAN Sound Remix – 03:59
- "Promises - Radio Edit" – 04:32
- "Promises - Gabriel & Dresden Remix" – 07:31
- "Promises - Mÿon & Shane 54's Summer of Love Mix" – 06:38
- "Promises - Mÿon & Shane 54's Summer of Love Intro Mix" – 06:26
- "Promises - Nitrous Oxide Remix" – 07:02
- "Promises - Secret Panda Society Remix" – 05:53
- "Promises - Marco V Remix" – 06:23
- "Promises - Richard Durand Remix" – 07:10
- "Promises - Kris O'Neil Remix" – 06:40
- "Promises - Soundprank Remix" – 08:35
- "Promises - Adam Sheridan Remix" – 09:06
- "Promises - David Call Remix" – 06:33
- "Promises - Mÿon & Shane 54's Summer of Love Radio Edit" – 03:48
- "Promises - Maor Levi's Analog Emotion Remix" – 07:52
- "Promises - Lenny Ruckus & Ana Vida Remix" – 08:29

== Credits and personnel ==
Written and composed by Josh Gabriel, Mavie Marcos, Dave Dresden, and David Penner. Produced by Josh Gabriel and Mavie Marcos. Mixed and engineered by Josh Gabriel. Remix and additional production by David Call.
