= Gatecrasher Wet =

Studio album by Various artists
- Released: 26 July 1999
- Recorded: 1998–99
- Genre: Trance
- Label: INCredible
- Producer: Andrew Gallagher

Various artists chronology
Gatecrasher Red (1999)	Gatecrasher Wet (1999)	Gatecrasher Disco-tech (1999)

Gatecrasher Wet is the third Andrew Gallagher produced album for Gatecrasher, released in 1999.

== Release ==
On 26 July 1999, the Sheffield-based club Gatecrasher released their third album, titled Gatecrasher Wet. Despite the massive success of the Gallagher produced albums Gatecrasher Black (1998) and Gatecrasher Red (Feb 1999) the third installment was initially rebuked by Simon Raine and Scott Bond due to the Northern expression "don't talk wet", but Gallagher persevered with his concept, explaining that its release date would coincide with what was to be an incredible summer of dance music. The album debuted at #3 in the UK compilation charts.

== Presentation ==
Gallagher's previous two Gatecrasher albums had a unique look and feel in their presentation (velvet covers with golden lettering for the special editions) his third instalment didn't disappoint, with a card digipack, layered with slippery plastic for the water droplet effects, and the lion logo. The tag line on the back of the album showed true confidence in the album; "Immerse yourself in the greatest dance album of the summer..." The inner contained a bold yellow booklet to continue the summer theme, and 2 teal blue discs, named Sub and Aqua respectively.

== Sound ==
Marc Lee-Smith again mixed the album and gave the album a 'Wet' feel and theme, with a selection of songs that gave wet, Ibiza sound. "Saltwater" by Chicane - one of the years big hits, was added to the album which tried to reflect the sounds that people associate with the summer - bright, wet, and uplifting.

Disc 1, named 'Sub' had the more variety of sounds and rhythms, whilst Disc 2, named 'Aqua' had a "harder" sound to it.

== Track listing ==
Sub

1. Phuture 2000 (Hybrid Remix) - Carl Cox
2. Finished Symphony - Hybrid
3. 831 - Desyfer
4. Game Master (Signum Remix) - Lost Tribe
5. Liquid (Trilithon Mix) - Nebular B
6. Liberation (Fly Like An Angel) (Ferry Corsten Remix) - Matt Darey
7. Everytime (Mike Koglin Remix) - Lustral
8. Synaesthesia (En Motion Mix) - The Thrillseekers
9. The Hymn (Mea Culpa Mix) - Skyscraper
10. Cream (Original Mix) - Blank & Jones
11. The Child - Mea Culpa
12. Pueblo Blanco - Salt Tank
13. Saltwater (Tomski Vs. Disco Citizens Remix) - Chicane featuring Maire Brennan
14. 4G - DJ Albert
15. Communication - Armin van Buuren
16. Heaven (Lange Remix) - Agenda
17. 9pm (Till I Come) (Matt Darey Mix) - ATB
18. Can't Wait To Find Love (Thrillseekers Remix) - Silhouette

Aqua

1. Apache - Starfighter
2. Remember (To The Millennium) (Lange Remix) - The Morrighan
3. Her Desire - Jupiter
4. The Awakening (Quake Remix) - York
5. Carla's Theme - Transa
6. Where Are You Now? (Moonman Remix) - The Generator
7. Take You There - Hagen, Ron & Pascal M
8. We Came - Vimana
9. Obessesion Forever - Unicorn
10. Everyday - Agnelli & Nelson
11. I Believe (DJ Tandu Remix) - Lange
12. Tomorrow (Full On Vocal Mix) - DuMonde
13. Spiritulised (Astral Mix) - The Olmec Heads
14. You Put Me In Heaven With Your Touch (Lange Remix) - Rhythm Of Life
15. Free To Ride (U.B.I.'s Fat Tyre Mix) - Crazy Malamute
16. Reincarnations (DJ JamX & De Leon's DuMonde Remix) - Steve Morley
17. Pulsar (Picotto Tea Mix) - Mauro Picotto
18. The Orange Theme (Moonman's Orange Juice Remix) - Cygnus X
