= Much Too Much =

Much Too Much may refer to:

- "Much Too Much" (The Who song), a 1965 song by The Who from the album My Generation
- "Much Too Much" (Andain song), a 2012 song and single by Andain from the album You Once Told Me
- "Much Too Much", episode 19 of the second season of Grey's Anatomy, an American television medical drama
