= Turn Up the Sound =

Single by Andain

from the album You Once Told Me
- Released: June 18, 2012
- Genre: Electronic, trance, chillout, drumstep
- Label: Black Hole

Andain singles chronology
| "Much Too Much" (2012) | "Turn Up the Sound" (2012) | "What It's Like" (2012) |

Music video
- "Turn Up the Sound" on YouTube

Audio sample
- "Turn Up the Sound - Radio Edit": file; help

"Turn Up the Sound" is the fifth release from Andain, marking the third and last promotional single prior to the duo's debut album, You Once Told Me.

== Overview ==
The single was released as two packages, each running as a Beatport exclusive for two weeks. The first part was released on June 18, 2012, as a remix EP, and featured three club mixes: two in the style of trance by tyDi and Xtigma, and one electro house remix by Francis Prève. The second part followed on July 2, 2012, and featured seven tracks, including an electro house remix by Tristan Garner; a drumstep remix by Stratus; a chillout remix by Zetandel; a trance remix by Gabriel & Dresden; and the album version of the song, in addition to one radio edit for each of the latter two mixes. Eventually, the song would also feature a music video, making its first appearance on YouTube, July 19, 2012.

While a demo version of the song was originally leaked in 2009, it had since been rewritten, moving from the original style in neo-trance to ethnic electronica. The song is thereby defined by an electronic breakbeat, vocal clouds, soaring strings and gritty synths, blended with elements of eastern music, creating a dark atmosphere with an undertone of tension. However, the new version also incorporates a revised section of the original song, going from the breakdown to the end.

== Official versions ==
BH 453–0

1. "Turn Up the Sound - tyDi Remix" – 07:03
2. "Turn Up the Sound - Francis Prève Remix" – 05:50
3. "Turn Up the Sound - Xtigma Remix" – 07:03

BH 454–0

1. "Turn Up the Sound - Original Mix" – 05:54
2. "Turn Up the Sound - Tristan Garner Remix" – 05:41
3. "Turn Up the Sound - Gabriel & Dresden Remix" – 07:24
4. "Turn Up the Sound - Stratus Remix" – 3:19
5. "Turn Up the Sound - Zetandel Chillout Mix" – 04:48
6. "Turn Up the Sound - Radio Edit" – 04:19
7. "Turn Up the Sound - Gabriel & Dresden Radio Edit" – 03:51
