= Mixman =

American interactive music company

Mixman Technologies, Inc.
- Type: Private
- Founded: April 1994
- Founders: Josh Gabriel, CEO; Eric Almgren, Chairman
- Headquarters: San Francisco, California, United States
- Area served: Worldwide
- Key people: Richard Appelbaum, Executive Director Chris Scarborough, Executive Director Oded Levy, Director
- Website: Mixman.com

Mixman Technologies, Inc. is an American interactive music company that develops computer software that allows for the creation and manipulation of music files. Founded by Josh Gabriel and Eric Almgren, Mixman launched in April 1994 and is headquartered in San Francisco.

== History ==
=== Early development ===
The original concept came from prototypes Gabriel developed while a student at the Institute of Sonology in the Netherlands. He had developed a system to control individual music loops and later a hardware configuration that involved projected light beams and sensors. A musician and computer programmer, he had long wanted to make composing and recording music accessible to the average person. After Gabriel and Almgren became partners in the early 1990s, they built a team to develop a hardware device prototype that could work with music cartridges much like video game cartridges. Within a year, the prototype was built and contained a hardware controller and music cartridges that held data for each song. The industrial designs of the hardware controller were designed by Scott Summit of Summit Industrial Design. Fundamental patents were also filed on the synchronization technology.

The original mission was to create powerful but easy-to-use interactive music creation tools that enabled the user to make and perform music with the digital song elements of their favorite artist or music style in real time. In other words, users could edit and rebuild the raw ingredients of a song. Later, the company turned to developing software as well as publishing dance music.

=== Products and technology ===
In 1996, Mixman released the first interactive CD that allowed users to perform live with their PC with zero latency and auto-beat matching. After partnering with record companies in 1996 and publishing one music title, Mixman launched Mixman Studio in 1997 and Mixman StudioPro in 1998, which shifted Mixman from a consumer activity toward a more sophisticated production and creativity tool. Mixman products were sold in both retail consumer outlets like Best Buy, Comp USA, Fry’s and Circuit City, as well as in the Music Instrument channel such as Guitar Center and other Music Instrument Stores.

=== Artist and label promotion ===
Mixman developed an online version that in conjunction with its online community promoted independent and major label artists for Mixman’s label and artist clients. The online community included user services such as an online radio station for user uploads (similar to Soundcloud) and community services (similar to what became offered by MySpace). From 2000-2001, Mixman launched online remixing songs called Mixman eMixes with Britney Spears, NSYNC, David Bowie, LL Cool J and forty other major artists.

=== Mixman the software company ===
Starting in 1996, Mixman developed and released several software SKUs to retail, licensed its software to OEMs and record companies and developed its online, self-publishing community. Mixman Studio Pro licensed software to several OEM brands including Sony, Creative Labs and Intel. Mixman also developed and licensed retail and online software in collaboration with major labels with notable titles such as George Clinton’s Greatest Funkin’ Hits (Capitol) and Tommy Boy’s Greatest Beats (Tommy Boy/Warners). Computer users were able to dissect and play with Clinton's classics by using Mixman software to keep the beats and mixes in sync. In 1999, Mixman released an apple Macintosh version. In 2000-2001, Mixman partnered with Mattel, Inc. for a hardware and software titled the DM2, which included a custom version of Mixman software, a USB controller manufactured by Mattel under its Apzu brand and creatively guided by Mixman who worked with Vice President of Mattel Steve Sucher and his teams. The DM2 included sounds from the Mixman sound library as well as some name brand artist content. A line of Sound Libraries titled Mixman Soundiscs were also available upon an upgrade to a more advances version of the software.

Mattel distributed the DM2 in retail chains like Toys-R-Us and Target. Over 200,000 units were manufactured and distributed in retail. When Mixman reformed as an independent company in 2002, Mattel had ceased development of their Apzu teen line, of which DM2 was the first product, and sold to Digital Blue with Mixman’s approval.

From 2002-2005, Mixman continued to develop and release new versions of software and two more SKU’s based on the hardware controller Mixman LoopStudio and Mixman MP3 Producer. The most advanced version of Mixman software is Mixman StudioXPro, released in 2003.

In 2006, Mixman ended its relationship with Digital Blue, stopped manufacturing further hardware units and shifted entirely to internet distribution. Mixman continued to explore partnerships with the music industry and technology companies and focused on a range of licensing and brand partner deals including Pepsi Frito Lay, SCION, M&M Mars, Hershey’s, Heineken and others.

In 2010, Mixman began developing a new strategy and business plan, and in 2011, Mixman entered a new partnership with Intel Corp. In January 2012 at CES in Las Vegas, Intel announced and presented a new version of Mixman that was exclusively available on the Intel AppUp Store. Notable optimizations were Intel chip architecture and consumer features like Rex file support and Export to Facebook. In 2012 and 2013, Mixman did two more deals with Intel and developed a new version of Mixman titled Mixman Loop10, specifically for the AAIO market with ten point touch capability and the ability to support 1, 2, 4 person playback.

Since 2014, the founders have been developing a new model and vision for Mixman now focused on the EDM market that Gabriel has been performing in for over a decade.

=== Venture financing, merger, IPO ===
Early seed funding for the company was provided by Almgren, Roger Summit and Dick Asher. Dr. Roger Summit, founder and CEO of Dialog Corporation and electronic music enthusiast, was the first board member and business advisor to the company. Dick Asher, former CEO of Polygram Music and President of Columbia Records (now Sony), also joined the board and became an investor and consultant to the company to facilitate working relationships with major record labels. Mixman’s Series A preferred stock financing was led by Don McKinney, founder and CEO of International Networking Devices and previously with Sequoia Capital.

In 1999, Mixman looked to raise a Series C venture financing in order to expand its internet presence and further development. Mixman was brought together with Beatnik, an internet audio company of similar size to Mixman, by the Mayfield Fund, led by Mayfield Partner Alan Morgan, with the idea that the Mixman application run on the Beatnik web audio platform. Mayfield agreed to fund the combined company with a $12M financing and to take the company public shortly thereafter. Tony Fadell, consulting for Mayfield, who later went on to create the iPod and iPhone, worked with Almgren to write the combined company business plan. Other investors included Zomba Music (later acquired by BMG), which also held a board seat.

The combined company quickly grew to 140 people and began preparing its S1 SEC filing to go public. In March 2000, market conditions caused the company to postpone the IPO. During the IPO process, the company raised $35M mezzanine round of financing led by MTV. As the lead revenue generator, MTV continued to invest in, develop and market Mixman software and content and continue partnerships with OEM’s and music content companies.

=== Leadership ===
Gabriel left the company in mid 2000 to start his career as a recording artist/producer and formed Gabriel and Dresden. Almgren left the company in late 2000 to start Vivcom, Inc. (now VMark.tv), a video search company. Almgren remained on the Beatnik board. In late 2002, Mixman once again became a stand-alone company.

Gabriel is the current CEO, and in 2018, Chris Scarborough joined the board as executive director. Scarborough spent his early career with Credit Suisse Tech and Media banking and then worked for media investment banking firm, Code Advisors, for which he helped finance and was a strategic advisor to Spotify for eight years.

== Accolades ==
Mixman software won Keyboard magazine software awards, and Josh Gabriel won “Demo God” at the 1997 and 1998 DEMO conferences.

== Music education ==
Mixman donates products and has assisted with programs with the Miracles Foundation, Zeum, Boys and Girls Clubs, and many other institutions in the U.S. and Canada.
