= Much Too Much (Andain song) =

Single by Andain

from the album You Once Told Me
- Released: January 30, 2012
- Genre: Electronica, breaks, chillout, drum and bass, drumstep, trance
- Label: Black Hole

Andain singles chronology
"Promises" (2011)	"Much Too Much" (2012)	"Turn Up the Sound" (2012)

Music video
- "Much Too Much" on YouTube

Audio sample
- "Much Too Much - Album Version": file; help

"Much Too Much" is the fourth release from electronica duo Andain, and the second promotional single taken from the subsequent studio album, You Once Told Me.

== Overview ==
The single was initially released as a digital download on January 30, 2012, featuring the album version of the song, a chillout remix by Zetandel, and a radio edit. A second issue with additional remixes was later released on February 27, 2012, which featured two drum and bass remixes by Relay & Front and Rido, and a drumstep remix by Shreddward & Exceed. Also, defining a third issue of the single, a trance remix by Mike Shiver was released on April 23, 2012.

The song's official music video premièred on February 2, 2012, on YouTube, three days after the single's initial release. An alternative version of the video was later released on March 13, 2012, which featured the remix by Zetandel. Simultaneously, the remix in question was also being promoted as a free download.

== Music video ==
Starring Andain's Mavie Marcos and guest star Jonathan Stoddard, the music video is set around the story of a couple in love; however, being gradually saturated by the contrast of their breakup. In between the storyline, Mavie is also seen performing a theatre dance, with the respective scenes shot at Marin Ballet in San Rafael, CA. The rest of the video shoot was done in Nicasio.

The music video was produced and choreographed by Melinda Darlington-Bach and Cynthia Pepper of Xanadu Entertainment, LLC, in collaboration with director Jamie Redford. Cinematography was conducted by Tylor Norwood, while the final editing was done by Remedy Editorial, LLC.

== Track listings ==
- BH 421-0
1. "Much Too Much - Album Version" – 05:00
2. "Much Too Much - Zetandel Chill Remix" – 04:29
3. "Much Too Much - Radio Edit" – 04:14
- BH 422-0
1. "Much Too Much - Relay & Front Remix" – 04:58
2. "Much Too Much - Rido Remix" – 04:32
3. "Much Too Much - Shreddward & Exceed Remix" – 06:28
- BH 442-0
1. "Much Too Much - Mike Shiver Remix" – 07:04
