= Nyana (album) =

Compilation album by Tiësto
- Released: May 6, 2003 (Netherlands)
- Recorded: 2003
- Genre: Trance
- Length: Disc 1: 77:20; Disc 2: 79:01
- Labels: Songbird; Nettwerk
- Producer: Tiësto

Tiësto chronology
In Search of Sunrise 3: Panama (2002)	Nyana (2003)	Just Be (2004)

Professional ratings
Review scores
Source	Rating
Allmusic	3/5 stars

Nyana is a double disc album by trance producer and DJ Tiësto, released on May 6, 2003. Disc one is labeled Outdoor, while the second CD is labeled Indoor.

According to the FAQ section on Tiësto's official website: "On a visit in South Africa, Tiësto was introduced to a cheetah named Nyana".

== Track listing ==
Disc 1: Outdoor
No.	Title	Length
1.	"Reinhard Voigt – Supertiel*"	7:05
2.	"Tom Mangan – Chutney (Josh Wink 'Size 9' Reinterpretation)"	4:48
3.	"The Ambush – Acapulco"	3:38
4.	"Tiësto and Junkie XL – Obsession (Frank Biazzi Remix)"	3:52
5.	"Planisphere – Totem"	8:00
6.	"Darren Tate vs. Jono Grant – Let The Light Shine In"	6:16
7.	"Midway – Inca"	3:55
8.	"Tiësto – Nyana"	7:34
9.	"Cor Fijneman featuring Jan Johnston – Venus (Meant To Be Your Lover) (Tiësto Remix)"	4:49
10.	"Conjure One featuring Sinéad O'Connor – Tears From The Moon (Tiësto In Search of Sunrise Remix)"	6:31
11.	"Ton T.B. – Electronic Malfunction"	5:40
12.	"The Gift – Love Angel (M.I.K.E. Remix)"	5:22
13.	"Solar Factor – Urban Shakedown (Original Mix)"	3:31
14.	"GTR – Mistral"	6:11

Disc 2: Indoor
No.	Title	Length
1.	"Catcher – Destiny Sunrise"	5:50
2.	"Filterheadz present Orange 3 – In Your Eyes (Blue Mix)"	3:56
3.	"Andain – Beautiful Things (Gabriel & Dresden Remix)"	7:15
4.	"Solarstone vs. Sirocco – Destination"	5:13
5.	"Young Parisians – U Write The Rules (Solarstone Remix)"	5:13
6.	"Holden & Thompson – Nothing (93 Returning Mix)"	5:40
7.	"Mr. Sam vs. Fred Baker Present As One – Forever Waiting"	5:39
8.	"Motorcycle – As The Rush Comes (Exclusive Demo Mix)"	6:43
9.	"The Roc Project featuring Tina Arena – Never (Tiësto Remix vs. Filterheadz Remix)"	9:29
10.	"Smart System – Morgentau (Spring Mix)"	4:42
11.	"Leama – Requiem For A Dream (Leama's Dream Mix)"	7:18
12.	"P.O.S – Remember (Summer Sun)"	5:32
13.	"Solid Globe – North Pole"	6:24

- Note: Track 1 of Disc 1 of the CD release is mis-labeled as "M. Mayer – Love Is Stronger Than Pride".

== Charts ==
Chart performance for Nyana
Chart (2003)	Peak position
Australian Albums (ARIA)	163
Canadian Albums (Nielsen SoundScan)	121
