= Mavie Marcos =

American singer and songwriter (born 1978)

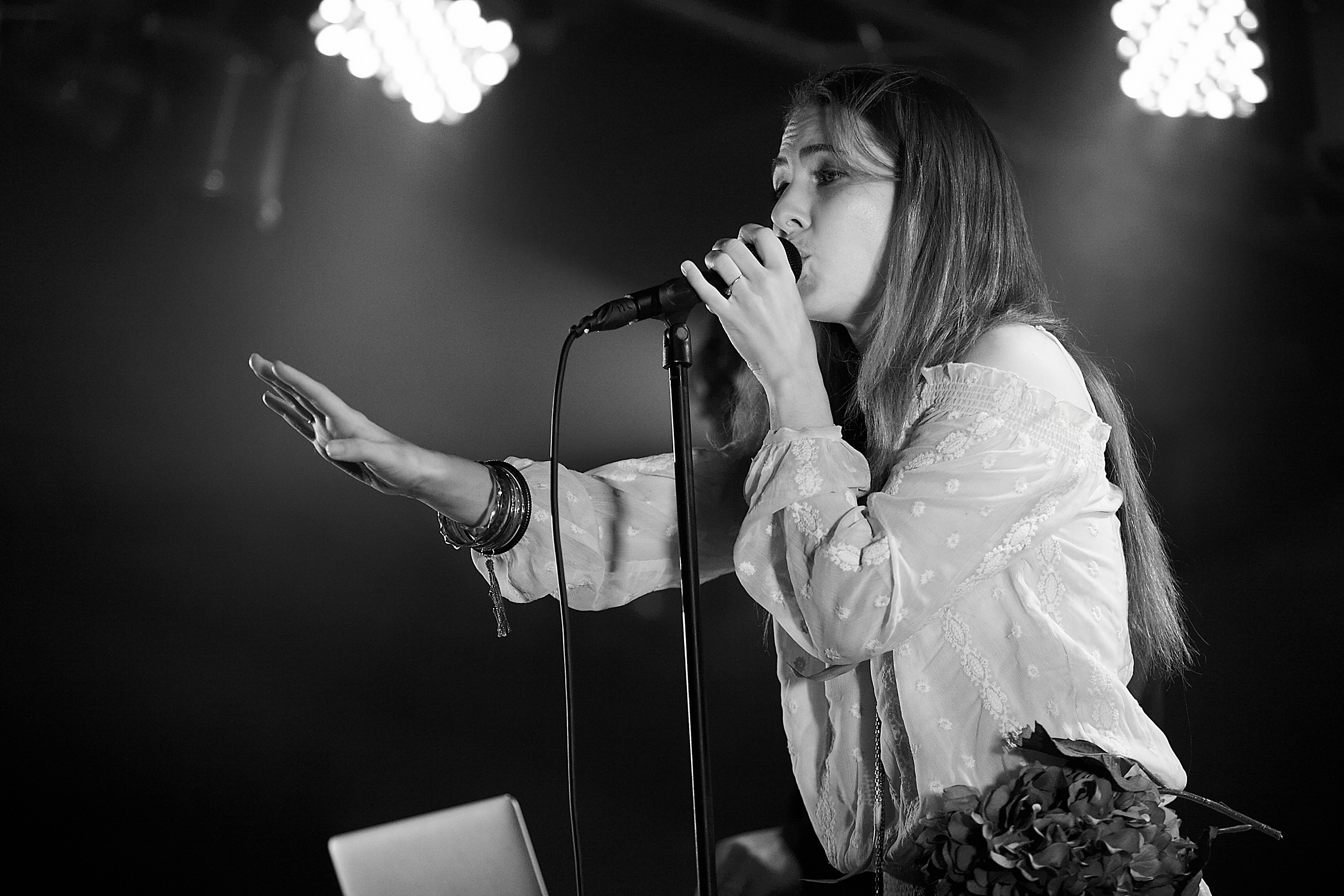
- Mavie Marcos; Andain – live @ March 2, 2013 – Russia, Saint-Petersburg

Background information
- Born: April 29, 1978 (age 48)
- Genres: Electronica, downtempo
- Occupations: Composer, lyricist, performer, pianist, personal trainer
- Instruments: Vocals, piano
- Years active: 2001–present
- Label: Black Hole
- Website: maviemusic.com Archived January 10, 2016, at the Wayback Machine

Mavie Marcos (born April 29, 1978) is an American singer and songwriter. As part of Andain, Mavie has written songs in partnership with Josh Gabriel since 2001, better known for their early singles "Summer Calling" (2002) and "Beautiful Things" (2003), and the 2012 debut album You Once Told Me. As of July 10, 2014, Mavie has also signed with Black Hole to start off the production of a solo album.

== Influences ==
Mavie Marcos is a classically trained vocalist. Marcos has performed pieces such as the aria Queen of the Night from Mozart's Magic Flute. She has also performed on stage in musicals, including Pirates of Penzance, West Side Story, and The Best Little Whorehouse in Texas. Up until 1999, when she moved to San Francisco, Marcos used her musical talents in the arena of classical music. After moving to the Bay Area, Marcos met a budding electronic music producer named Josh Gabriel. Shortly after, in 2000, Marcos became part of Andain, then an experimental, electronica group.

== Personal life ==
Mavie Marcos's educational and vocational pursuits have included science, health, and entrepreneurship in addition to music. Marcos graduated from Wellesley College in 1999 with a B.A. in Neuroscience. From 2001 to 2003 Marcos studied naturopathic medicine at Bastyr University. In 2004, Marcos founded Intuitive Fitness and for approximately four years helped clients with weight training and calorie-burning programs. In 2008, Marcos founded Rawplicity, working as a gourmet raw food chef and raw-food-benefits instructor.

== Personal music releases ==
- 2009 – "Girls Just Wanna Have Fun" (Cyndi Lauper Cover)

== Music videos ==
Mavie Marcos stars in several Andain music videos:

- Andain – Summer Calling (Song released November 15, 2002 as a 12".)
- Andain – Beautiful Things (Piano Version) (Song released October 27, 2003 as a 12".)
- Andain – Beautiful Things (Taken from Tiësto in Concert DVD) (Song released October 27, 2003 as a 12".)
- Andain – Promises (Song released June 6, 2011 as an MP3.)
- Andain – Much Too Much (Song released January 30, 2012 as an MP3.)
- Andain – Turn Up The Sound (Song released June 18, 2012 as an MP3.)
