= Andain =

American electronic music duo

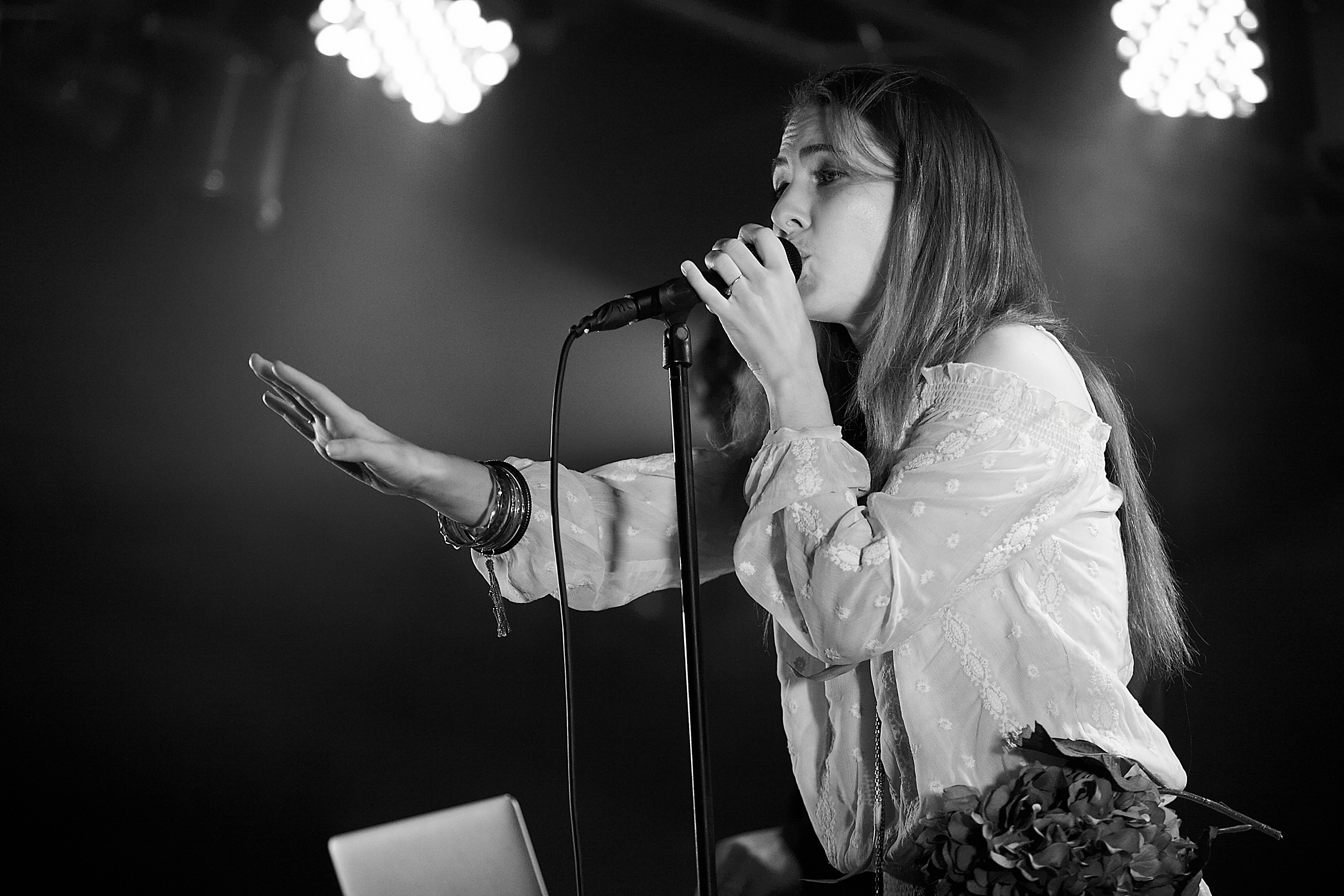
- Mavie Marcos, one of the two members of Andain

Background information
- Origin: San Francisco, California, U.S.
- Genres: Electronic, vocal trance
- Years active: 2002–2004, 2011–2014
- Label: Black Hole
- Members: Josh Gabriel, Mavie Marcos
- Past members: David Penner
- Website: soundcloud.com/andainofficial

Andain was a San Francisco-based electronic music duo, originally formed in 2000. They broke through in 2002 after being discovered by DJ Tiësto, reaching clubbers worldwide with their singles "Summer Calling" in 2002 and "Beautiful Things" in 2003. The band members initially included producer Josh Gabriel, singer and songwriter Mavie Marcos, and guitarist David Penner, before the group disbanded in 2006. Andain returned again in 2011 as Josh and Mavie, making their comeback with the single "Promises". The successive year saw the release of the band's first and only full-length album, on September 12, 2012, following a year of touring and performing. Andain was eventually concluded in 2014.

== Biography ==
=== 2000–06: Initial works ===
Andain began as an experimental electronica group in 2000, making their breakthrough in 2002 with the song "Summer Calling", after getting attention from Tiësto and signing with Black Hole. This eventually lead to the production of a club remix by Josh Gabriel, which was then promoted on Tiësto's compilation album In Search of Sunrise 3: Panama, to later be released as a 12" single with the B-side "Gabriel & Dresden Remix".

The following year saw the release of Andain's second single, "Beautiful Things", which since became the band's biggest hit and signature song. Being released and promoted as a remix by Gabriel & Dresden, the song made its first appearance on Tiësto's compilation album Nyana, eventually spawning a single. With enthusiastic reception from the club music scene, it has since become recognised as the band's signature track, spawning several remixes from Black Hole over the years.

While the sound of Andain would appear to be promoted as club oriented, a batch of leaked demos, namely "Time", "Get Up", "Make Me", "Ave Maria", and "You Once Told Me", would reveal a more experimental style of electronica with fusions of acoustic elements. As the leak would denote, the band was planning to record a full-length album, that was initially scheduled for a release in 2003. Meanwhile, "Beautiful Things" earned a nomination for Best Progressive / Trance under the Winter Music Conference 2004, with also Andain being nominated for Best New Dance Group. The year was also marked by a less prominent release from the band, with the track "Here is the House", a cover of Depeche Mode, presented on the compilation album Bloom by Gabriel & Dresden.

While no further news were published about the status of the anticipated album, an announcement from July 2005 stated that Andain was working on new material. However, due to high demands from other projects, the group suspended in 2006.

=== 2007–14: The official album ===
Andain would eventually reform in 2007 as Mavie and Josh, and the intent was set to create a new album. Two years later, an interview with Josh by Trance.nu would reveal the word of their next single, "Promises" – although, no word of an estimated release date was mentioned at the time. Nevertheless, the word of Andain began to stir into motion again, further supported by the leak of a new demo, "Turn Up the Sound".

After four years in the making, Andain's new album was handed in to the label in early April, 2011. Subsequently, with "Promises" getting closer to an official release, the single was given support by some of the most recognized DJs of the EDM scene, being promoted with remixes by the likes of Gabriel & Dresden and Mÿon & Shane 54. Eventually, the album version debuted with the official music video on June 1, 2011, while the single followed on June 6, 2011.

As the second single from the upcoming album, "Much Too Much" was released on January 30, 2012, while the official music video followed on February 2, 2012. The single was later succeeded by a three track remix EP on February 27, 2012, and a standalone remix by Mike Shiver on April 23, 2012.

While the album was still being prepared for release, "Turn Up the Sound" was selected to make an official appearance. As the third single taken from the album, the song made its debut as a three track remix EP on June 18, 2012, while the album version followed two weeks later, on July 2, 2012, along with additional remixes. Incidentally, the production of the song had been rewritten since the leak in 2009, with exception of the last part of the song, which preserved its original club oriented composition.

On August 10, 2012, the anticipated album was officially announced on Andain's Facebook page. Titled You Once Told Me, the record was finally released on September 24, 2012, featuring 11 tracks. Among the tracks, the album also featured new versions of the previously leaked "Ave Maria" and "You Once Told Me", while the exclusive iTunes LP Deluxe Version of the album housed another 8 additional bonus tracks, including the original version of "Summer Calling", and "Beautiful Things" in its classic club interpretation by Gabriel & Dresden.

Succeeding the release of You Once Told Me, the album also spawned two additional singles. First out, "What It's Like" was released on December 31, 2012, as an 8 track remix EP. In spite of the song's soft-rock nature, the remix EP sported a set of club mixes, lastly complemented by the album version. As the album's title track, "You Once Told Me" followed along one year later, released on December 16, 2013. The remix EP sported 6 tracks, featuring five trance remixes along with the album version, concluding the fifth single taken from the album.

According to the band's website, the members have moved on to new projects, including a solo career for Mavie.

== Discography ==
=== Albums ===
- 2012 You Once Told Me

=== Singles ===
- 2002 "Summer Calling"
- 2003 "Beautiful Things"
- 2011 "Promises"
- 2012 "Much Too Much"
- 2012 "Turn Up the Sound"
- 2012 "What It's Like"
- 2013 "You Once Told Me"

=== Covers ===
- 2004 "Here is the House"

== Awards and nominations ==
Following the success of their single "Beautiful Things", Andain earned a nomination for International Dance Music Awards in 2004, with the song being selected for the category Best Progressive / Trance. Simultaneously, the band itself was also nominated for Best New Dance Group. "Beautiful Things" would eventually also reward a trophy, as Andain was chosen to receive the Sunset Music Awards in 2010, during the Polish Sunrise Festival.

With "Promises" creating a stir as the comeback song for Andain in 2011, the band received another nomination for the International Dance Music Awards 2012. The song received two nominations under the categories Best Trance Track and Best Chillout / Lounge Track. However, as a song in the downtempo genre, no specific remix had been reported for the first category.

Andain also earned a nomination for the International Dance Music Awards 2013, this time with another entry in the category Best Chillout / Lounge Track, honoring Zetandel's remix of "Much Too Much", taken from the initial release of the 2012 single.

Year	Award	Category	Nominated work	Result
2004	International Dance Music Awards	Best Progressive / Trance	"Beautiful Things"	Nominated
2004	International Dance Music Awards	Best New Dance Group		Nominated
2010	Sunset Music Awards			
2012	International Dance Music Awards	Best Trance Track	"Promises"	Nominated
2012	International Dance Music Awards	Best Chillout / Lounge Track	"Promises"	Nominated
2013	International Dance Music Awards	Best Chillout / Lounge Track	"Much Too Much - Zetandel Chill Remix"	Nominated
