= Gatecrasher =

Clubbing brand

Logo for Gatecrasher clubs

Gatecrasher logo

Gatecrasher is an international clubbing brand made famous by the "Gatecrasher" (later "Crasher") dance music events, which were held at the Republic nightclub in Sheffield, UK during the late 1990s and early 2000s. The promoters of the brand were Simon Raine and Simon Oates and, until 2004, Scott Bond. By August 2014, the only Gatecrasher venue remaining was located in the United Kingdom city of Birmingham. This venue was closed down permanently by the authorities on 25 November 2015.

== History ==
=== Conception ===
During the early 1990s, Scott Bond was a DJ for nightclubs in Birmingham. In approximately 1992, Bond met Simon Raine who was the manager of a club called Bakers at the time. Bond subsequently agreed to become the new resident DJ at Bakers, while Raine focused on the promotion of a new club night called Absolutely Ridiculous. In 1993, Bond started his own night at Bakers called Republica and later that year, the pair decided to collaborate on a new one-off event named Gatecrasher.

=== Early years ===
Gatecrasher was first held as a one-off event in 1993 in the West Midlands at the Tardebigge Engine House. The night originally took its form from similar local clubs such as Fun, Wobble, Miss Moneypenny's and C.R.E.A.M. The club later moved to Bakers nightclub on Broad Street, Birmingham but became so popular that larger events were organised in other locations in and around the West Midlands.

Due to a large number of similar nights in the Birmingham area, the event was relocated to the northern city of Sheffield. The event was initially held in the Leadmill, then at The Arches, before moving to The Adelphi.

== Superclub years ==
In 1996, Gatecrasher started to use a nightclub in the city centre called The Republic for one-off events such as New Year's Eve; in 1997, the event moved to the venue permanently. Gatecrasher bought the venue in Sheffield later that year.

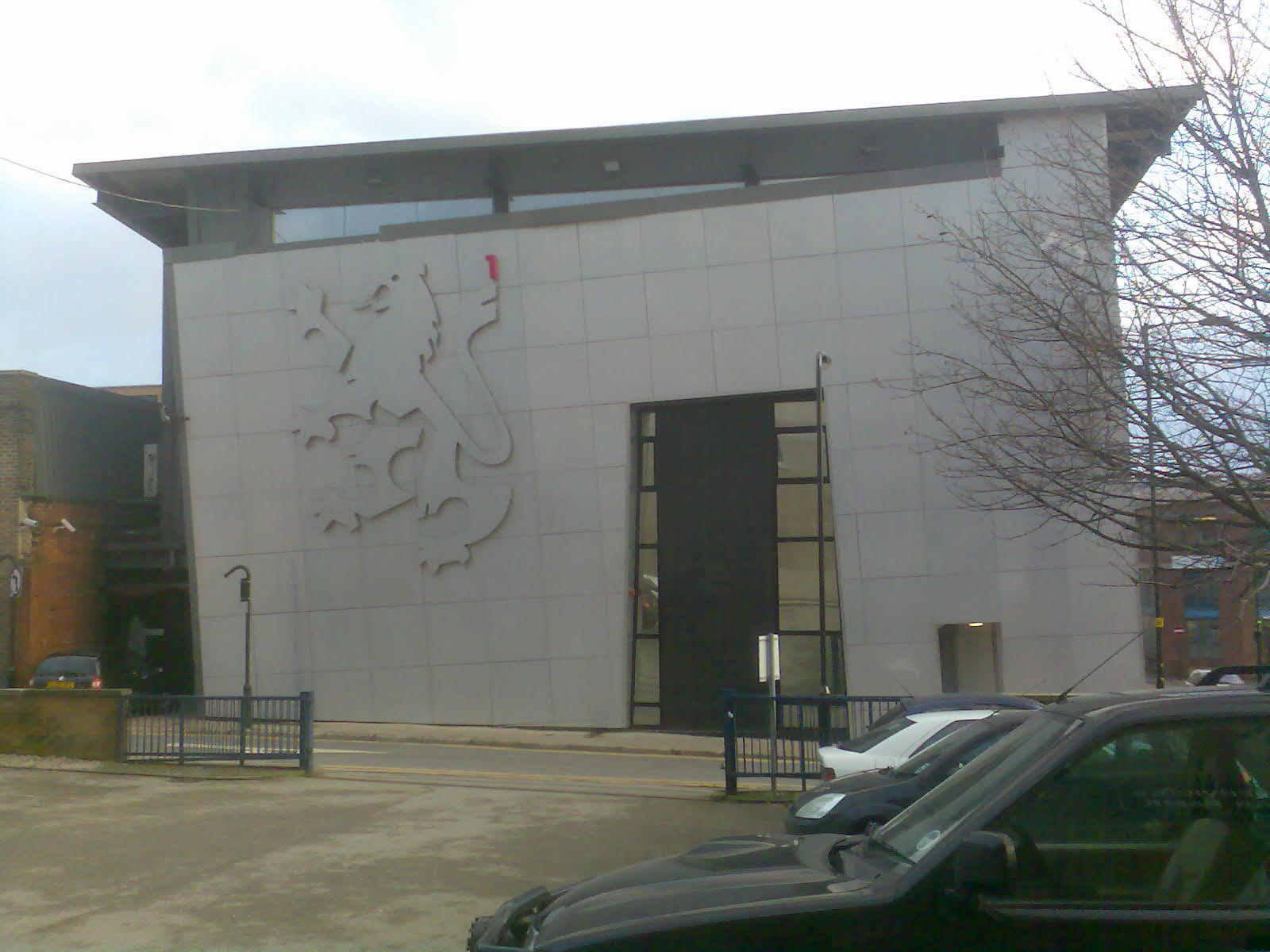
Gatecrasher One, formerly The Republic (Now demolished)

Gatecrasher offered an all-night event, with big-name DJs throughout the night, with Judge Jules as resident DJ. This attracted people from all over the country who liked a style of music that was originally Techno and House oriented. The door admittance policy was notoriously strict, seemingly turning people away for no apparent reason. Instead of discouraging people to attend, this policy only made the event more popular as gaining admittance to the club only added to the sense of excitement. The door policy also ensured that only dedicated and enthusiastic clubbers gained access. This resulted in a clientele and atmosphere that was rare at that time in any club in the UK. The door policy, and fashion at the end of the 1990s, encouraged people to dress in a flamboyant style to ensure entry to the night. The club developed a cult following (Crasher Kids) who in turn developed their own style of fashion, identifiable by fluorescent clothes, dummies, and spiky hair. Scott Bond's style of dance music was reflected in the DJs booked for the nights and at the end of the 1990s, Gatecrasher was instrumental in the rise of trance music with the use of DJs like Ferry Corsten.

In 1998, Gatecrasher joined forces with the London nightclub Ministry of Sound and held its first outdoor festival at Lotherton Hall in Leeds, which was also broadcast on BBC Radio 1. In the same year, the event received the Club of the Year award at the Ericsson Muzik Magazine Dance Awards, winning it again in 1999, and Gatecrasher CD Black was released. Gatecrasher has won other awards, including, The Guardian's and Times Club of the Year award in 1999, BEDA Awards Event of the Year category in 1999, Mixmag's Crowd of the Year award in 1998 and Ministry Magazine Club of the Year award in 1999.

The Lotherton Hall event was repeated in 1999, but Gatecrasher organised it alone; the event was again broadcast on BBC Radio 1. During the same year, Gatecrasher began a nine-year relationship with Sheffield's Designers Republic studio for the production of the nightclub brand's artwork. Gatecrasher also bought the Music Factory nightclub in Sheffield in 1999 and renamed it Bed. The music at Bed was mainly house music, with the club's promotion aimed at consumers who were older and more sophisticated than the typical Gatecrasher attendee. American house music DJ Roger Sanchez celebrated his birthday with a seven-hour DJ set at Bed in May 2004.

During a visit to South Africa, Gatecrasher performed to sold-out venues at Wembley Stadium in Johannesburg and The Dockside in Cape Town. Gatecrasher has toured around the world to: Europe, Australia, Taiwan, China, Malaysia, Hong Kong, Singapore, and Japan.

Gatecrasher's 2000GC Millennium Eve event was held at the Don Valley Stadium in Sheffield and attracted 25,000 people. The event was held in a portable structure called Tensile 1, designed by Rudi Enos (given a Guinness World Record for Largest Portable Event Venue) and had ten operational bars, several spanning over 25 metres. According to Gatecrasher promoter Simon Raine, 2000GC was: "ten years of promoting parties, ten years of production knowledge, and ten years of contacts all put into one very special night."

Gatecrasher relocated its summer festival to Turweston Airfield near Brackley, Northamptonshire. The renamed Summer Sound System event was held in June 2000. Gatecrasher then launched its own record label in 2001, followed by the release of the first album Digital.

On 19 May 2001, South Yorkshire Police made a drugs raid on the Republic nightclub, making 13 arrests and seizing "a substantial amount" of drugs. Around 800 clubbers were ejected from the premises after 160 officers entered it.

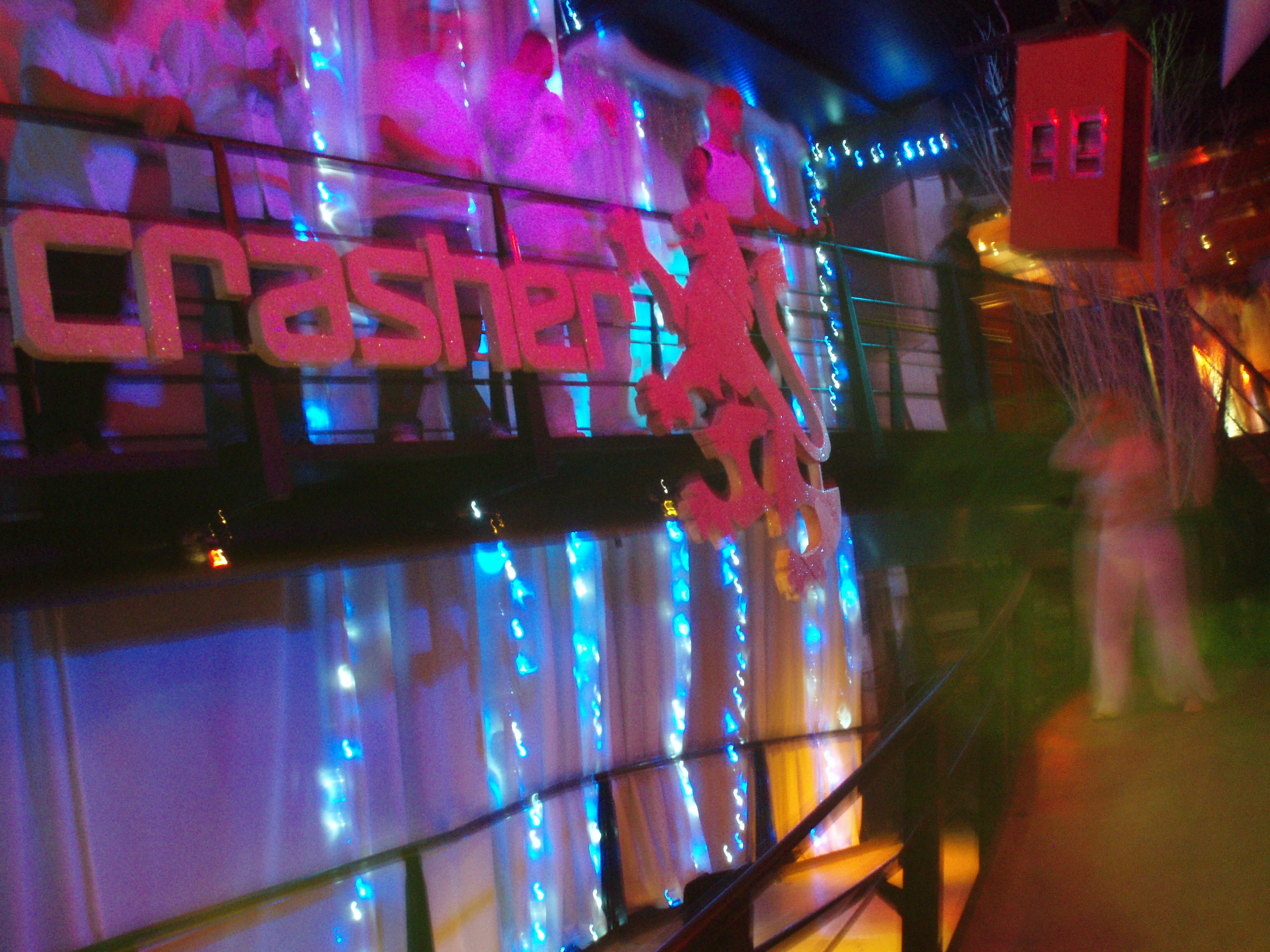
Gatecrasher One bridge in the Foyer Area

== Reinventing the brand ==
By late 2003, reflecting a widespread decline in UK super club attendance, the Gatecrasher event changed from a monthly event to one held only on special occasions, such as Bank Holidays. In order for Gatecrasher to continue, the company began to focus on the nightclub market and not just single events. In 2003, the company re-branded The Republic, completely refitted the club, and renamed it "Gatecrasher One", in preparation for another ten new Gatecrasher venues around the UK. At the same time, the actual club night was renamed Crasher and the Bed nightclub was closed.

In September 2005 the company opened a new club in Leeds under the name Discothèque. In 2007, Gatecrasher bought Media nightclub in Nottingham, and after a million pound refurbishment, relaunched the venue as Gatecrasher Nottingham.

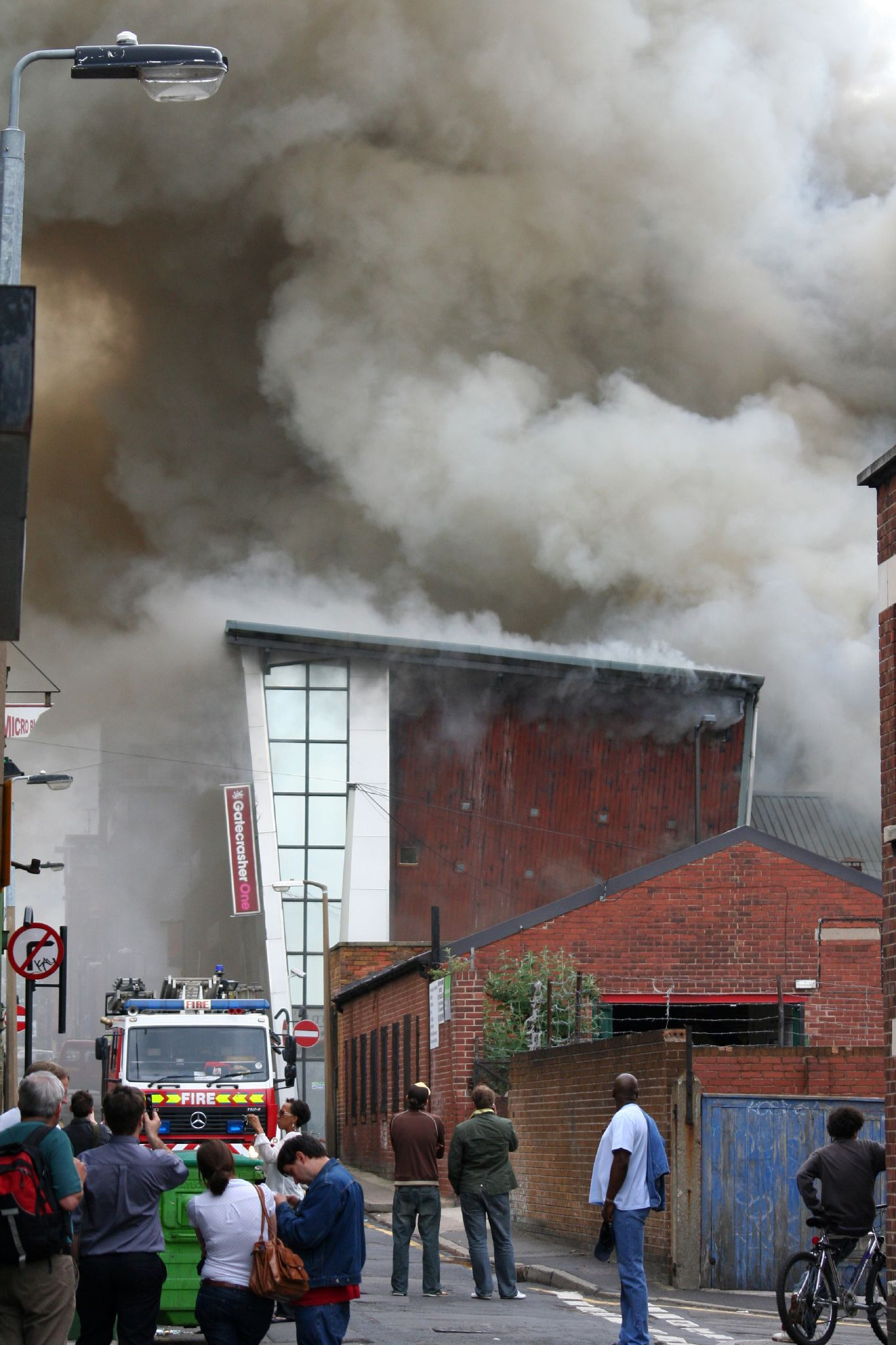
Gatecrasher on fire

On the evening of 18 June 2007, Gatecrasher One caught fire and partially collapsed. Only a small number of staff were in the building at the time and the building was evacuated safely. No official cause or explanation for the fire was released. Further inspections by structural engineers revealed that the building was beyond repair and that any attempt to restore the building would be unsafe, so the buildings were demolished.

Gatecrasher in Leeds was rebranded as Gatecrasher7 in 2007. The downstairs room was fully overhauled and branded as BED. In September 2008, Gatecrasher opened a 5 million pound superclub in Birmingham, UK that was designed by Callin Fortis of Big Time Design Studios. Also in 2009, Gatecrasher Loves Nottingham was re-branded as "Gatecrasher Ultra" and their Watford venue, "Area", was re-designed.

Since the fire at Gatecrasher One, Gatecrasher have held one-off events at the Magna Centre near Rotherham and Carling Academy in Sheffield.

In 2010, the company announced a new £5 million reopening of Gatecrasher One, subject to planning approval. However, this was later refused by Sheffield City Council. The decision is now being appealed by Gatecrasher.

=== Controversy and administration ===
Gatecrasher7 in Leeds was shut down on 29 March 2011, after its licence was revoked earlier in the year due to a spate of violence and a stabbing. Gatecrasher successfully appealed its licence revocation and the Leeds club re-opened at the end of 2011. Re-branded as Bed Nightclub, the re-opening was based on the condition that metal detectors were installed, and only plastic glasses were used.

Based in Birmingham, the Gatecrasher company entered administration in August 2013 after amassing debts of more than £3.5 million. Administrators Duff and Phelps published a report in which they explained that under the names "Tiptoptap Ltd" and "Late Night Watford Ltd", the Gatecrasher owners incurred operating losses of £1.1 million from June 2012, to 31 March 2013. Furthermore, the report stated that in excess of £500,000 was owed to HM Revenue and Customs, while the Birmingham Mail news publication also published another debt of £3 million that was owed to the Barclays banking and financial services company (an August 2014 company statement denied the Barclays debt). Raine explained to the media that over 300 jobs would be retained during the transition to a newly formed limited company called "Gatecrasher (Birmingham) Ltd", stating:

The transfer of the business to the new company, along with extensive corporate restructuring and refunding of the business, has enabled Gatecrasher to progress on a secure financial footing. The restructuring was the only option available to ensure the continued viability and growth of the business and also preserve jobs.

In September 2013, the Leeds Magistrates Court found Gatecrasher guilty of selling counterfeit alcohol after the West Yorkshire Trading Standards visited the Bed venue on 11 September 2012 in response to complaints. The officers confiscated 656 litres from the premises, the largest seizure of fake alcohol by the Standards Office at the time, and subsequent tests revealed that the alcohol contained isopropanol, tertiary butanol and chloroform. The Court fined Gatecrasher £5000, with costs of £2095.67.

Redbrick, the student publication of the University of Birmingham, published an article in October 2013 that provided further information about the University's Guild of Students' boycott of Gatecrasher due to a significant debt that was outstanding at the time. In an official statement, The Birmingham University's Guild claimed that the company owed both the Guild and student groups a total amount of around £28,000. the statement concluded: "student groups are no longer able to work with the venue so that we take a collective approach. This decision has been made in the best interests of both students and student groups." In an August 2014 official statement, Gatecrasher claimed that the Guild declined the "full payment" offered by the company.

Following a reported €3 million refurbishment, the Gatecrasher Ibiza venue was opened in 2014 on Ibiza in the space that was previously the venue for the Eden club. The opening night was held on 29 May 2014 and featured artists such as Aly & Fila and Mistajam.

Gatecrasher Ibiza failed to open on 29 August for what was its flagship night, this following a gradual reduction in opening over the previous weeks.

At the beginning of August 2014, the Beatsmedia music company published an article on its website titled "GATECRASHER: THE GATE THAT FINALLY CRASHED!!!" after it received complaints from anonymous members of the music industry who claimed that they have been mistreated by the company. On its website, Beatsmedia explained that it was borne of "a desire to help link musicians who work hard", while its article aims to give "a voice to the people affected" by Gatecrashers alleged conduct—Beatsmedia also claim that Gatecrasher ignored the "public's outrage". Complaints against Gatecrasher were also made on social media platforms including comments made by artists; for example, the Super8 & Tab group claimed on Facebook, in response to the cancellation of their Ibiza performance that "they [Gatecrasher] have simply failed to stick to contractual agreements and book travel for the artists".

Gatecrasher responded with an official statement on its own website, stating that "sensationalist online portals and blogs" had been furthering "their own selfish pursuits". The statement explains that the Beatsmedia article is "being dealt with", as it contains "false facts" that are "libelous". The company responded to the key allegations in the Beatsmedia article and invited anyone who was still owed money from the 2013 administration process to contact Duff and Phelps directly or email Gatecrasher's Accounts Department. In terms of Ibiza, the statement explains that the company was forced to make programmatic changes in accordance with what "the market dictates" and claims that all consumers who were entitled to a refund have been paid. Writing for the TranceFixxed website, Tim Turner concludes:

For the sake of all parties, I hope that Gatecrasher not only survives this but thrives. But for this to happen, it cannot be at the expense of other people. The music community needs to give Gatecrasher time and encouragement how to turn itself around. Gatecrasher in turn needs to listen to the public dissatisfaction, take on board the constructive criticism, learn from its own past mistakes and work with (and not against) the music community. The public claims and counterclaims and general 'chucking of toys from the pram' is great entertainment for social media, but a company at war with its customers does not remain a company in business for very long...

Gatecrasher's Broad Street Club was shut down on 31 October 2015 the result of a stabbing and alleged brawl involving security staff. This was the second closing in three months. The victim was stabbed in the leg and security staff were accused of using makeshift weapons in a brawl with a group of customers. Superintendent Andrew Beard, of West Midlands Police, said the force would be asking for the full revocation of the licence at a full hearing on 25 November 2015. On 25 November, Birmingham City Council revoked Gatecrasher's licence to operate. The Deltic Group is in discussions with Gatecrasher about taking over operations of the venue.

== Past resident DJs ==
- Judge Jules
- Scott Bond
- Paul Van Dyk
- Tiësto
- Matt Hardwick
- Corey
- Sandy Turnbull
- Nick Riley (Riley & Durrant)
- Eddie Halliwell
- Ashley Casselle
- Ashley Beedle
- Dino
- Trophy Twins
- The Funk Junkies
- Will Holland

== Discography ==
The popularity of the Gatecrasher brand is partly due to the large number of compilation albums having been released. The first seven albums were released on the Sony offshoot label INCredible. The album Gatecrasher's Trance Anthems (1993–2009) achieved gold status.

Date	Title	Catolog Code	Countries released in
1998	Gatecrasher Black	INC2CD	UK, Australia
1999	Gatecrasher Red	INC5CD	UK, Australia
1999	Gatecrasher Wet	INC8CD	UK, Australia
1999	Gatecrasher Disco-Tech	INC11CD	UK, Europe, Australia
2000	Gatecrasher Global Sound System	INC12CD	UK, US, Australia
2000	Gatecrasher National Anthems	INC22DCD	UK, Australia, South Africa
2001	Gatecrasher Discotech Generation	502074 9	UK, US, Australia, Mexico
2001	Gatecrasher Digital	GATECD1	UK, Australia
2002	Gatecrasher Experience	GATECD2	UK, Australia
2002	Gatecrasher Digital Trance	GATECD3	UK, Australia
2002	Gatecrasher Resident Transmission	GATECD4	UK
2003	Gatecrasher Resident Transmission 02	GATECD5	UK
2004	Gatecrasher Presents Crasher Live in Amsterdam & Kuala Lumpur	GATECD06	UK, Russia(?)
2005	Gatecrasher Classics	GCCD01	UK, Australia
2005	Gatecrasher Classics 2	GCCD02	UK
2006	Gatecrasher Forever	GCCD03	UK
2007	Gatecrasher Christopher Lawrence Live in Moscow	GCCD04	UK, Russia
2007	Gatecrasher Immortal	GCCD05	UK
2008	Gatecrasher Sheffield – Ferry Corsten	GCCD06	UK
2008	Gatecrasher ICE ICE ICE — Mix Album by Judge Jules	ПРЗ CD78967 (Russia) od 000723 (Ukraine)	Russia, Ukraine
2008	Gatecrasher The Summer Sound System 2008	GCCD07	UK
2009	Gatecrasher's Trance Anthems (1993—2009)	WMTV086	UK
2009	Gatecrasher's Club Anthems (1993—2009)	WMTV121	UK
2010	Gatecrasher Anthems — Paul Van Dyk	WMTV141	UK
2010	Superclub (with Cream and Pacha)	WMTV157	UK
2011	Superclub Ibiza (with Cream and Pacha)	VTDCD 1031	Europe
2013	Gatecrasher 20: Past Present Forever	WMTV195	UK
