= Jon the Dentist =

British record producer

- Born: John David Vaughan; 2 October 1965 (age 61); United Kingdom
- Origin: United Kingdom
- Genres: Trance, Hard House

John David Vaughan (born 2 October 1965), known professionally as Jon the Dentist, is a British hardhouse and trance music record producer. He released many popular singles including "Feel So Good" and "Imagination" with Ollie Jaye, both of which reached the UK Singles Chart.

Vaughan was born to parents Shirley and David in Eltham, London, and grew up in nearby Shooter's Hill with his sister Kate. A short period of time training to be a dentist resulted in his professional DJ name.

In 2001 Jon the Dentist released the compilation album Damn Trance, which, according to Allmusic, had beats that "hit hard and often".
