= Beautiful Things (Andain song) =

Single by Andain
- Released: October 3, 2003
- Genre: Progressive trance; trance; progressive house; breakbeat
- Label: Black Hole
- Songwriters: Josh Gabriel, Mavie Marcos, David Penner
- Producers: Josh Gabriel, Dave Dresden

Andain singles chronology
"Summer Calling" (2002)	"Beautiful Things" (2003)	"Promises" (2011)

Audio sample
- "Beautiful Things - Radio Edit": file; help

"Beautiful Things" is the second release by Andain. It first appeared on Tiësto's compilation album Nyana, released May 6, 2003, and was later published as a single via Black Hole, on October 27, 2003.

== Overview ==
While "Beautiful Things" was promoted and released as a remix by Gabriel & Dresden, the song originally started out as an unreleased guitar track titled "Annie". In response to a request from Tiësto for a follow-up to the single "Summer Calling", "Annie" was rewritten to become a club track, also changing the lyrics from a narrative third person view to first person. According to Mavie, "Beautiful Things" is, "in a general sense, about feeling stuck; in a place, time, you just can’t get yourself out of".

The Gabriel & Dresden remix per se is characterized by a sharp beat and thick bassline. It's also notable for fusing acoustic and electronic elements, including guitars and percussion instruments in conjunction with synthesizers and electronic drums. Vocal clouds and echoing elements in the background also exemplify the band's influence of dub music.

In 2004, "Beautiful Things" earned a nomination for Best Progressive / Trance at the International Dance Music Awards. In tribute to the song, Andain has also received the Sunset Music Awards, given at the Polish Sunrise Festival 2010.

== Piano version ==
On October 26, 2010, Andain published an acoustic live performance of the song on YouTube. The video features Mavie singing and playing an original piano arrangement of the song.

== Official versions ==
The following remixes have been published by Black Hole, either appearing as standalone singles, remix EPs or as part of a track compilation.

2003

- "Beautiful Things - Gabriel & Dresden's Unplugged Mix" – 10:48
- "Beautiful Things - Radio Edit" – 04:11
- "Beautiful Things - Radio Edit 2" – 03:17
- "Beautiful Things - Josh Gabriel Remix" – 08:11
- "Beautiful Things - Photon Project Remix" – 09:31
- "Beautiful Things - Photon Project Dub" – 07:14
- "Beautiful Things - Cor Fijneman Remix" – 08:22
- "Beautiful Things - Markus Schulz' Shadows of Coldharbour Remix" – 11:29

2007

- "Beautiful Things - Have a Break, Have a K&D Remix" – 09:09

2008

- "Beautiful Things - Gustav Remix" – 07:46
- "Beautiful Things - Dave Robertson Remix" – 07:22

2010

- "Beautiful Things - Jorn van Deynhoven's Sundale Mix" – 08:26
- "Beautiful Things - Pedro del Mar & Ole van Bohm Remix" – 09:04
- "Beautiful Things - Roger Shah's Magic Island Remix" – 09:21
- "Beautiful Things - Spaio & Sleazy Tek Remix" – 07:40

2013

- "Beautiful Things - Kastis Torrau & Donatello Remix"

2014

- "Beautiful Things - Fady & Mina Remix"
- "Beautiful Things - Daniel Skyver Remix"

2015

- "Beautiful Things - Dapa Deep Remix"
- "Beautiful Things - Kastis Torrau & Donatello Remix"

2016

- "Beautiful Things - Heikki L & Darude Remix"

== Credits and personnel ==
Written and composed by Josh Gabriel, Mavie Marcos and David Penner. Remix and additional production by Josh Gabriel and Dave Dresden.

== Charts ==
Chart performance for "Beautiful Things"
Chart (2023)	Peak position
Hungary (Single Top 40)	32
