= Scott Bond =

British DJ

- Origin: Birmingham, England
- Genres: Trance, EDM
- Years active: 1989-

Scott Bond is a British trance DJ, producer, and promoter who began DJing in 1989. He started out DJing at venues such as Cream, Miss Moneypenny's, Fun and Gatecrasher, which he co-founded. He has toured internationally with Gatecrasher. He was voted World's Finest Resident DJ in the Mixmag Dance Awards.

== Biography ==
Scott Bond, John Purser, Darren Hodson and Nick Rose have also recorded under the name Q:Dos, producing and writing dance tracks as well as re-mixing for most of the major dance labels. Scott has also worked on many tracks with Solarstone. One of his most critically acclaimed releases has been in collaboration with Solarstone, a track called "Third Earth" [more commonly known as 3rd Earth].

He mixed multiple albums for the Sheffield club brand, Gatecrasher.

His most recent production Airfoil is a collaboration with Marc Mitchell, and was released in September 2014.
