= Josh Gabriel =

American DJ

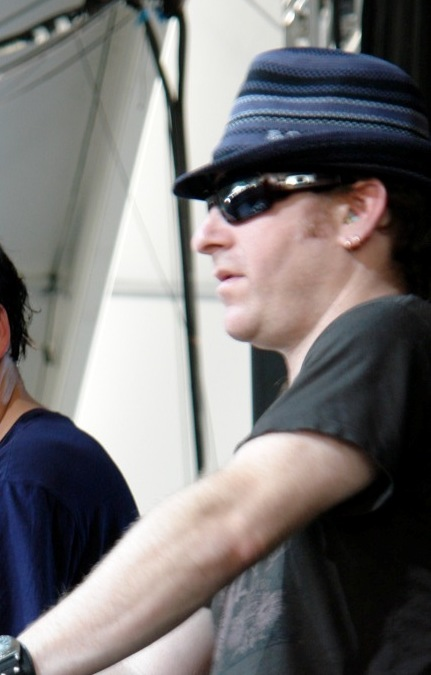
- Gabriel performing with Gabriel & Dresden at Coachella Festival in 2006

Background information
- Born: Josh Gabriel
- Origin: San Francisco, California, United States
- Genres: Progressive trance, electronic
- Occupation(s): DJ, producer, remixer
- Years active: 1988–present
- Labels: Organized Nature, Different Pieces, Vandit

Josh Gabriel is an American electronic dance music DJ and producer, most known for his collaborative partnership Gabriel & Dresden with Dave Dresden.

== History ==
=== Early years (1988–2000) ===
In 1988-89, a 20-year-old exchange student from California Institute of the Arts, was living in The Hague in the Netherlands and studying at the Institute of Sonology. Josh Gabriel had already been working with digital music since his high-school days, achieving mastery of the DX7 and TX816 by the age of 17. With an Apple Macintosh Plus, operating system 3, and the earliest of music applications like Mark of the Unicorn's "Composer" and "Performer", Josh was already at the bleeding edge. In the Netherlands, Gabriel's inventor spirit took shape as he wrote a computer application to control samples on an Akai S900 in real-time with a joystick. And the inception for what later became Mixman had been born. Along with electronics whiz Jan Pannis, (Stockhausen's tech-man) Gabriel and Pannis built an apparatus which converted beams of light coming up off the floor into a Midi Control device and the 20-year-old Gabriel dressed in black, wearing white gloves performed his real-time beat-trigger device in the clubs of Amsterdam.

By 1993 Gabriel was doing high-end digital sound editing, design and production in Los Angeles, and finally found a business partner and the journey that was to become Mixman began. Mixman had always been conceived as a hardware device, the "Walkman", the "Discman", the "Mixman"... and several proto-types were built. The path to hardware was longer than software and in late 1995 early 1996 the first Mixman application was released to the public. Spin Control, included 8 songs from the San Francisco underground Dance Music scene, that were remixable with only a PC, enough RAM and a proper sound card.

Gabriel's patents for loop-based music remixing are the backbone of industry standard music making software applications used in virtually every producers studio today. By 1999, Mixman had evolved and grown and merged with a larger dot.com. Expanding briefly to the Mac platform and deepening its relationship with Record Labels and MTV as well as starting work with Mattel on a controller (eventually became the DM2) -- things looked good. But as happened with many dot.coms the ride got bumpy. In late 2000 Gabriel decided he had had his fill of the corporate life, and decided he wanted to return to "music". In 2002 Mixman sprung free of the dot.com shackles and returned to independence.

=== Gabriel & Dresden (2001–2008) ===
Before he attended music school in the Netherlands and Los Angeles and started experimenting with synthesizers and computers in the early 1980s. At the same time Dave Dresden was a club deejay in a suburb of New York City as well as a renowned US dance music journalist. He became the Music Director of grooveradio.com and met Pete Tong, who asked him to help find music for the Essential Selection. They met at a party being hosted by grooveradio.com at the Miami Winter Music Conference in March 2001. Josh gave Leon Alexander a record, the record was "Wave 3", which Dave then gave to Pete Tong, and he played it on the Essential Selection and also used it for his compilation that same year. Pete gave Dave the opportunity to do a spec mix of New Order and Dave asked Josh to work on it with him. The two joined forces in 2001 and made a name for themselves by creating numerous remixes. In 2002 Gabriel & Dresden released their first single "Lament" (Saw Recordings) in the United States. The duo released numerous singles and number one Billboard hits like "Tracking Treasure Down" and "Dangerous Power"; They also released one self-titled studio album together, Gabriel & Dresden. Josh played the electric bass on Armin van Buuren's single "Zocalo" in which both Dave & Josh produced the sounds.

The duo won the 2007 and 2008 IDMA award for "America's Best DJ". He has achieved 16 Billboard Dance Chart No. 1 hits as "Gabriel & Dresden", composed music that has appeared on Fox, HBO, NBC and CBS TV shows. Gabriel & Dresden have their own record label, Organized Nature. Gabriel has also invented a new pro-audio web application that will be available to the public in Winter 2009.

=== Solo years (2008-2010) ===
Josh spent his time off from Gabriel & Dresden starting a label called Different Pieces (via Armada Music) and working on three different album projects. The first, his 2008 solo album "Eight" which was named after the amount of analog synthesizers used to record it. He also worked on an album project for Winter Kills, Josh's band project with vocalist Meredith Call. This yielded the song "Deep Down" which charted on the Billboard Hot Dance Club Songs chart and was on Armin Van Buuren's A State of Trance 2009 year-end compilation. He also produced the debut album for Andain "You Once Told Me" which finally saw a release in 2012 and spawned a sizable hit with the song, "Promises (Andain song)", which Gabriel & Dresden remixed in 2011.

=== Gabriel & Dresden reunion (2011–present) ===
On December 31, 2010, Gabriel & Dresden reunited for special one off New Year's Eve celebration alongside ATB and Francis Preve at the Hollywood Palladium in Los Angeles.

Shortly afterward, the duo were booked on the Anjunabeats WMC Miami party at the Ice Palace as a special guest. Since this event, Gabriel & Dresden have officially announced themselves as reunited.

Since the reunion, Gabriel & Dresden have performed at many clubs and festivals around the world including Electric Daisy Carnival (Las Vegas, Dallas, Chicago & Orlando), Tomorrowland in Belgium, Electric Zoo Festival in New York, Sunburn Festival in India, Escape From Wonderland, Nocturnal Wonderland, Paradiso Festival, Creamfields Australia, ASOT 550: Invasion, Ministry of Sound, London, Zouk and a monthly residency at the Marquee Las Vegas in Las Vegas.

In 2011 they signed an artist deal with Armada Music which brought forth their mix compilation "Mixed for Feet, Volume 1" as well as numerous singles including 2012'a "Play it Back" featuring Betsie Larkin, "Tomorrow Comes" with Neil Ormandy (2013), "Shatter" (with D-Wayne) and a re-working of Tracking Treasure Down Revisited.

On February 3, 2014, they restarted their monthly radio show "Gabriel & Dresden present Organized Nature" on Digitally Imported's progressive channel. Since this show was already on the air in the past, it began this time around with Episode 30.

On March 29, 2014 they released "Rise Up" which was supported by a wide variety of DJs including Above & Beyond, Eric Prydz, Armin Van Buuren, Markus Schulz, Jason Bentley, amongst many others. The official music video for this song was generated entirely from Creative Commons License content found on the video sharing website Vimeo

== Discography ==
For discography as Gabriel & Dresden, see Gabriel & Dresden discography.

=== Albums ===
- 1996 Mixman: Remixable Hip-Hop · House · Acid Jazz · Underground (Compilation album)
- 2008 Eight (Studio album)
- 2011 Winter Kills

=== Singles/EPs ===
- 2002 Wave 3
- 2005 Alive
- 2006 Tracking Treasure Down
- 2007 Summit
- 2008 Tone Program
- 2009 Rubber
- 2009 Wood
- 2009 Winter Kills - Deep Down
- 2009 Entropy
- 2010 Winter Kills - My Friend

=== Remixes ===
- 2002 Andain - Summer Calling (Josh Gabriel Mix)
- 2003 Andain - Beautiful Things (Josh Gabriel Mix)
- 2004 RND() - Nova Santori (Josh Gabriel Mix)
- 2010 Layo & Bushwacka! - Let The Good Times Roll (Josh Gabriel Unauthorized Dub)
- 2008 Francis Preve - Caboose (Josh Gabriel Remix)
- 2008 Stel - New Life (Josh Gabriel Remix)
- 2009 Andain - Promises (Josh Gabriel Remix)
- 2009 Winter Kills - Deep Down (Josh Gabriel Remix)
- 2010 BT - Every Other Way (Josh Gabriel Remix)

=== Co-productions ===
- Andain - Summer Calling
- Andain - Beautiful Things
- Tiësto - Walking on Clouds
- Armin van Buuren - Zocalo
- Markus Schulz - Without You Near
- (As Winter Kills (with Meredith Call)) Armin Van Buuren - Take a Moment
- Ellen Meijers - Oddworld: Abe's Oddysee soundtrack (1997)
- Oddworld: Soulstorm soundtrack

== Awards and nominations ==
For awards as Gabriel & Dresden, see Gabriel & Dresden Awards / Nominations.

- Nominated WMC Best Progressive / Trance - Beautiful Things - Andain
