= ETD Pop =

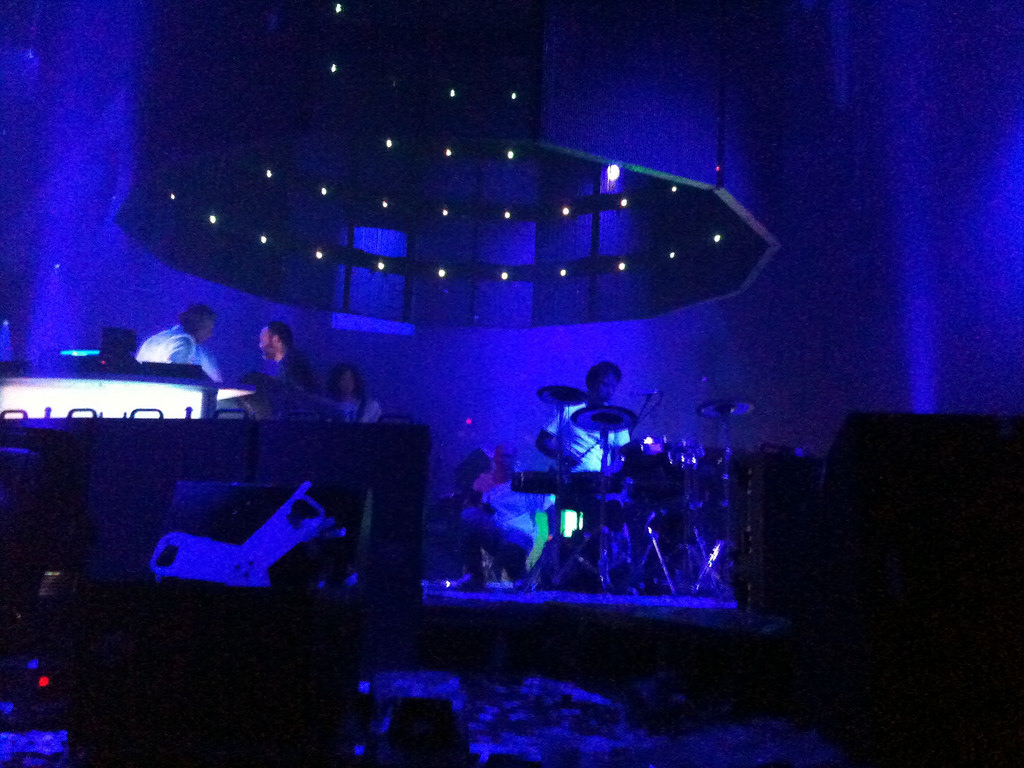
- Genre: trance, house
- Dates: Memorial Day Weekend
- Locations: San Francisco, California, U.S.
- Years active: 1997–2015
- Founders: SKILLS
- Website: www.skillsdj.com

E.T.D. Pop stands for Electro Techno Disco Popsicle. ETD Pop was an annual electronic music festival held at the Cow Palace in Daly City, California, U.S., a suburb of San Francisco. It was hosted by the Berkeley-based event promoters Skills.

It was first held in 1997. In 2008, ETD Pop featured Deep Voices, Markus Schulz, Ferry Corsten, Kaskade, Donald Glaude, DJ Dan, and Tiesto, and in 2009, Paul van Dyk, Ferry Corsten, Deadmau5, and Sander van Doorn. The line-up was usually announced at the earlier Skills event ETD Love.

== ETD POP 2010 Lineup ==
Armin Van Buuren
Infected Mushroom
Benny Benassi
Fedde le Grand
Boys Noize
Gareth Emery
Steve Aoki
LA Riots
Deep Voices

== Talent ==
Artists who have performed at ETD Pop in previous years are listed below.

- Armin Van Buuren
- Above & Beyond
- OceanLab
- Lange
- Markus Schulz
- Sub Focus
- Benny Benassi
- Christopher Lawrence
- Tiësto
- Ferry Corsten
- Deep Voices
- Donald Glaude
- DJ Dan
- Kaskade
- Infected Mushroom
- Dieselboy
- Paul van Dyk
- Sander van Doorn
- Deadmau5
- Blix Cannon

== See also ==
- List of electronic music festivals
- List of music festivals in the United States
