= The Club (2004 TV series) =

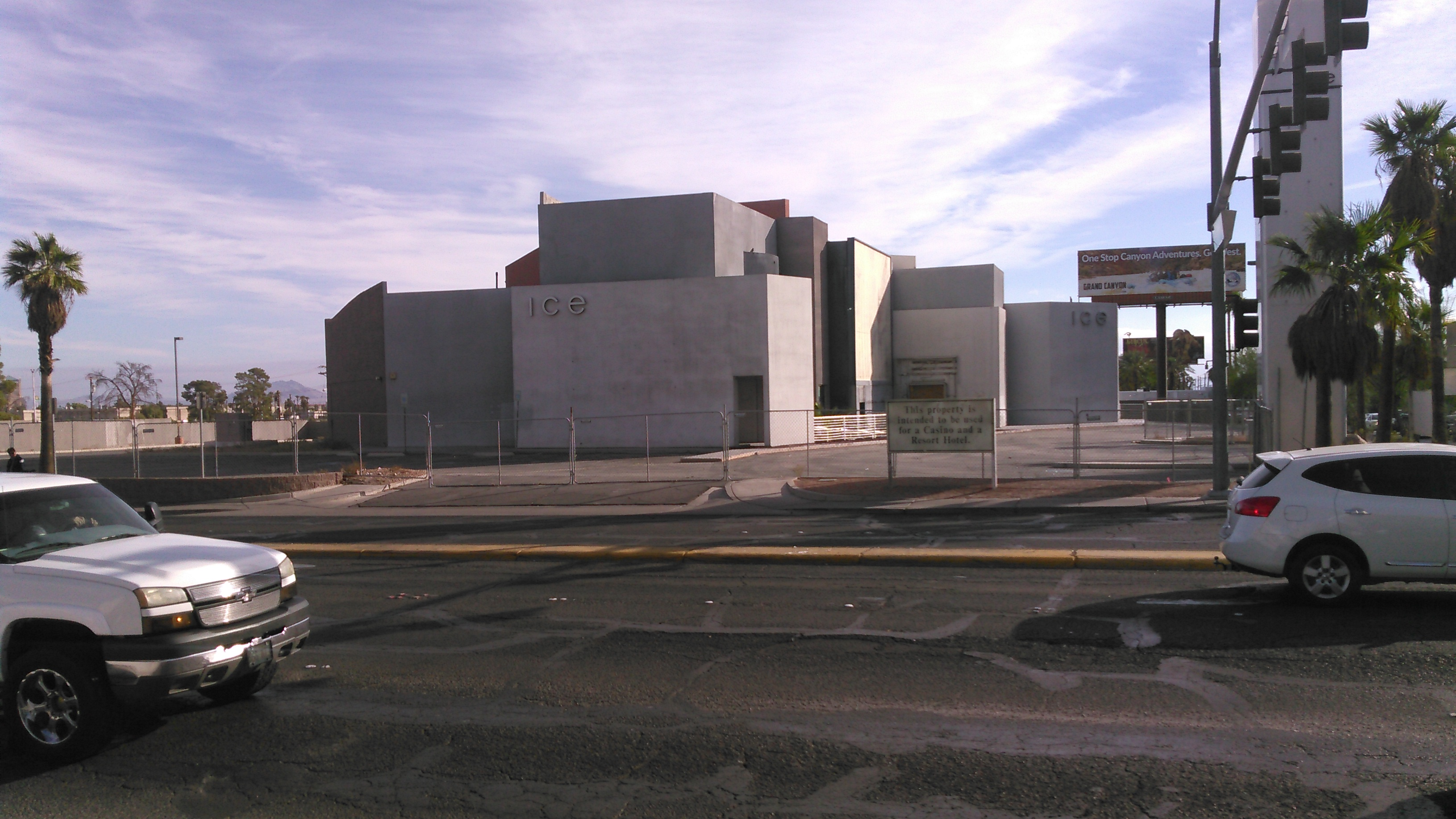
- The former Ice Nightclub, setting for The Club, in 2017.
- Genre: Reality television
- Presented by: Matt Brown
- Country of origin: United States
- Original language: English
- No. of seasons: 1
- No. of episodes: 4

Production
- Executive producers: Robert Rosenberg; Ben Silverman; Kevin Dill
- Production companies: Dill Entertainment; Full Circle Entertainment; Reveille; Spike TV

Original release
- Network: Spike TV
- Release: November 10, 2004 – January 26, 2005

The Club is an American reality television series about the competitive and cutthroat world of ICE, a stand-alone nightclub in Las Vegas. The series aired on Spike TV from 2004 to 2005.

== Overview ==
The show was an insiders look at the pressures and demands the people behind the party face in making ICE the ultimate nightlife experience. It featured appearances from DJs as Donald Glaude, Paul Oakenfold, DJ Dan, Tiesto and Armin Van Buuren. It also featured a Heineken sponsored DJ contest featuring LadyHouse, DJ Tatiana, DJ Diamond and LoveJules judged by Paul Oakenfold and Colleen Shannon. DJ ROCKIT, the selected winner of the contest opened up for Sandra Collins and Paul Oakenfold.
