= Gran Ciudad =

Live album by Debi Nova
- Released: March 31, 2017
- Recorded: 2016
- Genres: Acoustic music; jazz; bossa nova; Latin pop
- Length: 55:06
- Languages: Spanish, English, Portuguese
- Label: Sony Music Latin
- Producers: Mario Caldato Jr., Debi Nova

Debi Nova chronology
| Soy (2014) | Gran Ciudad (2017) | 3:33 (2020) |

Singles from Gran Ciudad
- 1. "Dale Play" Released: March 2017

Gran Ciudad (English: Big City) is the third album recorded by Costa Rican singer-songwriter Debi Nova. It was recorded live in Marini Estudio, Rio de Janeiro and MCJ Studio and Media Marea Studio in Los Angeles, California, and released by Sony Music Latin on March 31, 2017.

The album was co-produced by Nova herself, along with producer Mario Caldato Jr., and it features percussionist Sheila E. and rapper Illa J on "Dale Play" and "Este Amores" respectively.

Gran Ciudad was recorded as a concept album, in which all 11 songs, collectively, tell the story of her experiences as an immigrant in the big city of Los Angeles, California.

Prior to the album's launch, the songs "Gran Ciudad" and "Hábito" were released as promotional singles, after which "Dale Play" featuring Sheila E. was released as the official first single. The album spawned 1 more single for "No Nos Sobran Los Domingos". The album received a nomination for Best Singer-Songwriter Album at the 2017 Latin Grammy Awards.

== Background ==
A singer-songwriter and multi-instrumentalist since the age of 14, Nova set out on a path to achieve her dream at 17, when she left her native Costa Rica, and moved to the big city (Spanish: gran ciudad) of Los Angeles, CA, where she lives to this day, having only moved back to Costa Rica for a year in 2013.

It was her experiences as an immigrant in LA, the search for herself, and every situation that one encounters in an unknown place, that inspired her to write all 11 songs included on the album.

On her official website, she said the record was written about taking the first steps towards achieving your dreams, without caring about what others say; a moment in which a superhuman force dictates your destiny and makes you travel to those things you yearn.

Nova stated in an interview that the trip marked her life, especially the first years, where she was in search of her own voice and had the opportunity to work with Sergio Mendes, citing what happens when one leaves home, the feelings of loneliness, and of freedom, as being key aspects that inspired her to write the album.

== Recording ==
Nova wrote all the songs in the album over a period of two years.

== Track listing ==
| No. | Title | Writer(s) | Producer(s) | Length |
|---|---|---|---|---|
| 1. | "Club" | Debi Nova | Mario Caldato Jr., Debi Nova | 3:18 |
| 2. | "Gran Ciudad" | Debi Nova, Bartosz Brenes | Mario Caldato Jr., Debi Nova | 4:11 |
| 3. | "El Amor Lo Quita Todo" | Debi Nova | Mario Caldato Jr., Debi Nova | 3:50 |
| 4. | "No Nos Sobran Los Domingos" | Debi Nova | Mario Caldato Jr., Debi Nova | 3:03 |
| 5. | "Bailar Así" | Debi Nova, Grecco Buratto | Mario Caldato Jr., Debi Nova | 2:43 |
| 6. | "Dale Play" (featuring Sheila E.) | Debi Nova | Mario Caldato Jr., Debi Nova | 3:15 |
| 7. | "Para Que Tú Me Quieras" | Debi Nova | Mario Caldato Jr., Debi Nova | 2:53 |
| 8. | "Este Amores" (featuring Illa J) | Debi Nova | Mario Caldato Jr., Debi Nova | 3:57 |
| 9. | "Hábito" | Debi Nova | Mario Caldato Jr., Debi Nova | 3:26 |
| 10. | "Bola De Cristal" | Debi Nova, Carlos Paucar | Mario Caldato Jr., Debi Nova | 3:58 |
| 11. | "Pajarito" | Debi Nova | Mario Caldato Jr., Debi Nova | 3:45 |
| Total length: | | | | 55:06 |

== Accolades ==
18th Latin Grammy Awards

| Year | Nominee / work | Award | Result |
|---|---|---|---|
| 2017 | Gran Ciudad | Best Singer-Songwriter Album | Nominated |
