= Luna Nueva =

Luna Nueva (English: New Moon) may refer to:

- Luna Nueva (Diego Torres album), a 1997 album released by Argentinian singer-songwriter Diego Torres
- Luna Nueva (Debi Nova album), a 2010 album by Costa Rican singer Debi Nova
- "Luna Nueva" (song), a 2001 song by Colombian singer-songwriter Carlos Vives
