= Scream 2 (Markus Schulz album) =

Studio album by Markus Schulz
- Released: February 21, 2014
- Genre: Trance
- Label: Armada Music

Markus Schulz chronology
Scream (2012)	Scream 2 (2014)	Watch the World (2016)

Singles from Scream 2
- 1. "Remember This" Released: November 11, 2013; 2. "Muse" Released: February 14, 2014; 3. "Revolution" Released: February 14, 2014

Scream 2 is the fifth studio album by German trance producer & DJ Markus Schulz, released on 21 February 2014 by Armada Music.

No.	Title	Featured artist(s)	Length
1.	"Reloaded"		4:36
2.	"Revolution"	Venom One and Chris Madin	3:49
3.	"Blown Away"	Liz Promo	6:43
4.	"Remember This"		2:57
5.	"Erase You"	Lady V	4:56
6.	"Destino"		4:39
7.	"Muse"	Adina Butar	4:56
8.	"Dancing in the Key of Life"		3:01
9.	"Lord Knows"	Liz Horsman	4:44
10.	"Fireworks"	Klauss Goulart and Paul Aiden	5:11
11.	"In the Shadows"		3:38
12.	"Make You Fall"	CeCe Peniston	4:31
13.	"Mango"		6:31
14.	"Mardi Gras"		3:52
15.	"Gravity"	Amy Kirkpatrick	3:52
16.	"Reflection"		4:20
17.	"Towards the Sun"	Rex Mundi	4:51
Total length:			77:07

Extended, download release (#ARDI3445)
No.	Title	Featured artist(s)	Length
1.	"Reloaded (Extended Mix)"		6:55
2.	"Revolution (Extended Mix)"	Venom One and Chris Madin	5:21
3.	"Blown Away (Original Version)"	Liz Promo	6:43
4.	"Remember This (Extended Mix)"		6:29
5.	"Erase You (Extended Mix)"	Lady V	6:37
6.	"Destino (Extended Mix)"		7:23
7.	"Muse (Extended Mix)"	Adina Butar	7:29
8.	"Dancing in the Key of Life (Extended Mix)"		5:00
9.	"Lord Knows (Extended Mix)"	Liz Horsman	6:44
10.	"Fireworks (Extended Mix)"	Klauss Goulart and Paul Aiden	5:42
11.	"In the Shadows (Extended Mix)"		6:03
12.	"Make You Fall (Extended Mix)"	CeCe Peniston	5:49
13.	"Mango (Extended Mix)"		6:43
14.	"Mardi Gras (Extended Mix)"		5:24
15.	"Gravity (Extended Mix)"	Amy Kirkpatrick	5:18
16.	"Reflection (Extended Mix)"		7:26
17.	"Towards the Sun (Extended Mix)"	Rex Mundi	5:43
Total length:			106:49

== Charts ==
Chart (2014)	Peak position
Dutch Albums (Album Top 100)	29
