= Markus Schulz =

German DJ and producer (born 1975)

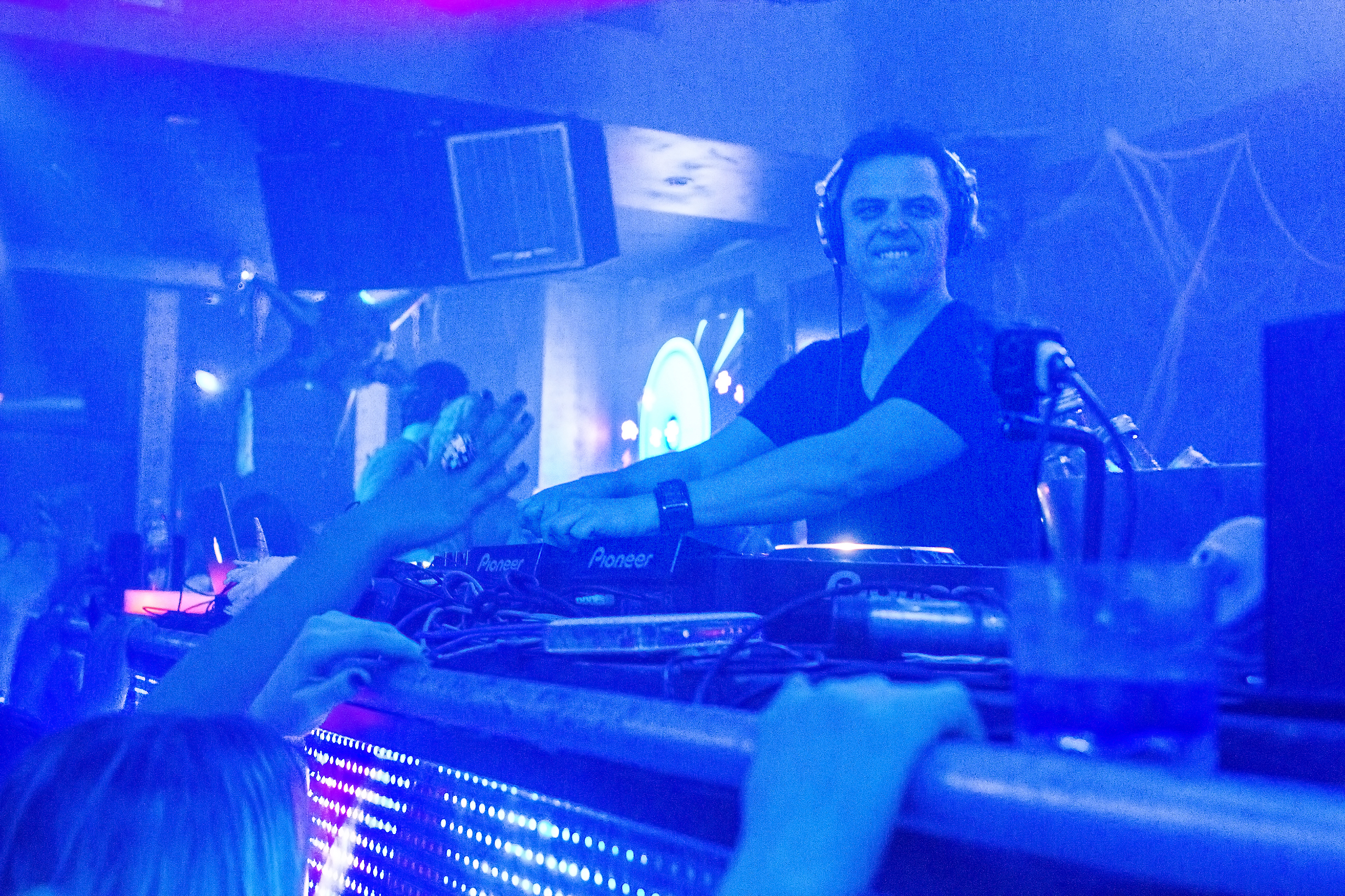
- Schulz at Sutra, OC California, 2012

Background information
- Also known as: The Unicorn Slayer; Dakota; New World Punx (with Ferry Corsten)
- Born: Markus Schulz; 3 February 1975 (age 51)
- Origin: Eschwege, Germany
- Genres: Trance; dance
- Years active: 1990–present
- Labels: Coldharbour; Armada; Ultra; Cat
- Website: www.markusschulz.com

Markus Schulz (/ʃʊlts/ SHUULTS, German: [ˈmaʁkʊs ˈʃʊlts]; born 3 February 1975) is a German DJ and record producer based in Miami, Florida. Best known for his weekly radio show titled Global DJ Broadcast that airs on Digitally Imported radio, ah.fm and other online stations, Schulz is also the founder of the label Coldharbour Recordings and Schulz Music Group (SMG), an artist management company that manages rising stars in the industry. In September 2012, Schulz was crowned America's number one DJ by DJ Times.

In early 2013, after several spontaneous back-to-back performances, Schulz and Ferry Corsten announced they would be producing and touring together as the new EDM group New World Punx. Their debut arena show was held at Madison Square Garden.

== Productions ==
Schulz has released 15 mix compilations and seven artist albums under his own name. He has also released productions and albums, Thoughts Become Things, Thoughts Become Things II and The Nine Skies, under the alias Dakota. Through his work with remixing tracks, he has had the opportunity to work with such artists as: Depeche Mode, Madonna, Everything but the Girl, Jewel, OceanLab, Gabriel & Dresden, Télépopmusik, Fatboy Slim, Miro, Book of Love, Blue Amazon and PQM. His remixes of "Intuition" and "Stand" by Jewel both hit number one on the Billboard club chart.

His seventh studio album, We Are The Light, released on 12 October 2018.

== Performances ==
When not in the studio working on new mixes, Schulz maintains an extensive international touring schedule. He originally held a seven-year residency at The Works in Scottsdale, Arizona, where he developed his style. Since then, he has continued to perform at clubs all over the world including stereo nightclub Avalon, Club Space, Green Valley, Ministry of Sound, Ruby Skye and Zouk.

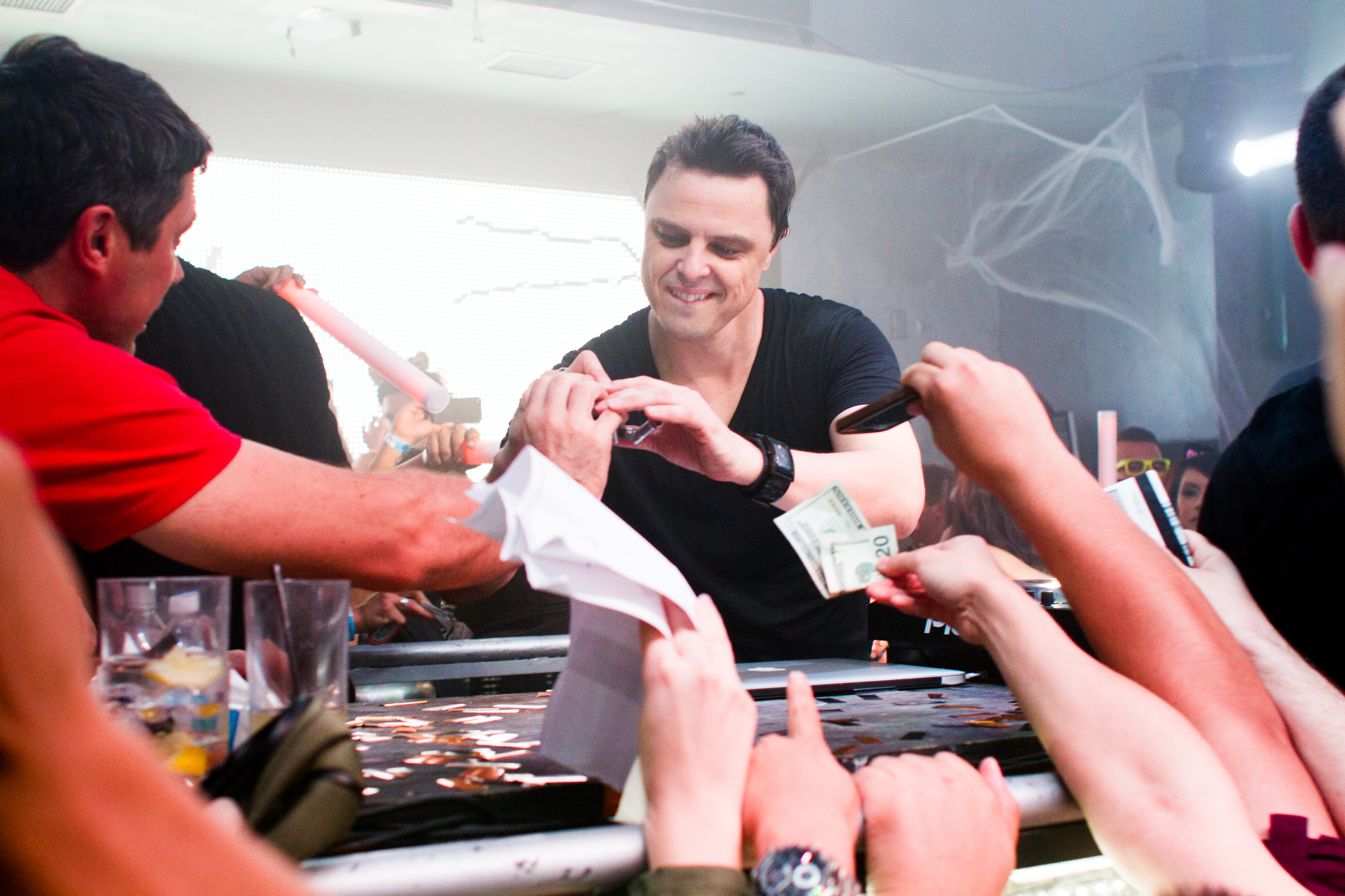
Schulz signing autographs for fans at Sutra in Orange County, California, 2012.

Logo of Markus Schulz.

He has performed DJ sets at some of the largest festivals and events: Electric Daisy Carnival; Electric Zoo; Monster Massive; Together As One; Ultra Music Festival; Amsterdam Dance Event; Nature One; Dance Valley; Love Parade; Global Gathering; Creamfields; ETD Pop; Transmission; Trance Energy 2010; Bang Music Festival; Future Music Festival; Bal en Blanc; on Episodes 250, 300, 350, 400, 450, 500, 550, 600 and 650 (as New World Punx) of A State of Trance; and at Summafieldayze on the Gold Coast, Australia. In 2013, Schulz launched a North American tour with the M Machine called Scream Tour. A second North American tour started in April 2014 following the release of Scream 2.

On 28 October 2010, DJ Magazine announced the results of their annual Top 100 DJ Poll, placing Schulz at number 8 in the world. In September 2012, Schulz was crowned America's Number 1 DJ by DJ Times. In DJ Magazine's 2013 poll, he was number 21 in the ranking.

Schulz is known amongst his fans as the "Unicorn Slayer". Many EDM artists nowadays tend to fall back on light, upbeat melodies, nicknamed "unicorn melodies", but Schulz prefers to use square waves and pitch bends. After somebody tweeted, "Markus Schulz: the unicorn slayer of trance," Schulz retweeted it and the nickname caught on.

== Personal life ==
Schulz married Heather Pfeifer in 1993. They had a son in 1995, and the couple worked together to develop his DJ business. They divorced in 2015.

Schulz married the Romanian singer Adina Butar on 1 June 2019, in Ibiza. Schulz was 44. The two work primarily in Miami but they also built a home in Sarmizegetusa, Hunedoara, Romania.

== Discography ==
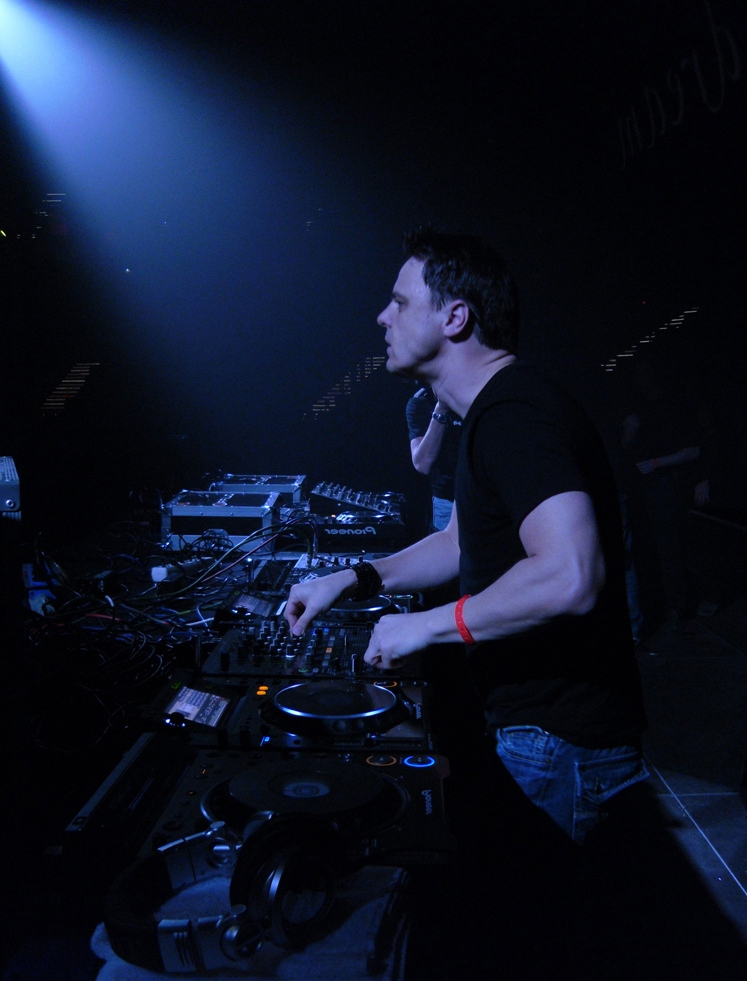
Schulz performing at Mayday 2010 in Poland.

=== Studio albums (as Markus Schulz) ===
- Without You Near (2005, Armada Music)
- Progression (2007, Armada Music)
- Do You Dream? (2010, Armada Music)
- Scream (2012, Armada Music)
- Scream 2 (2014, Armada Music)
- Watch the World (2016, Black Hole Recordings)
- We Are the Light (2018, Black Hole Recordings)
- Escape (2020, Black Hole Recordings)
- The Rabbit Hole Circus (2023, Black Hole Recordings)

=== Studio albums (as Dakota) ===
- Thoughts Become Things (2009, Armada Music)
- Thoughts Become Things II (1 July 2011, Armada Music)
- The Nine Skies (December 2017, Black Hole Recordings)
- Odyssey to the Netherworld (2022, Coldharbour Recordings)

=== Remix albums ===
- Without You Near (The Remixes) (2007)
- Progression Progressed - The Remixes (2008, Armada Music)
- Do You Dream? - The Remixes (2011, Armada Music)
- Dakota – Thoughts Become Things II (The Remixes) (13 January 2012, Armada Music)

=== Compilation albums ===
- Shikodachi (1999, Safari Media )
- Kamaidachi (2000, Safari Media )
- American DJ - 04 Phoenix (2001, The Right Stuff)
- Coldharbour Sessions (2004, Armada Music)
- Miami '05 (2005, Armada Music)
- Ibiza '06 (2006, Armada Music)
- Amsterdam '08 (2008, Armada Music)
- Armada At Ibiza - Summer 2008
- Toronto '09 (2009, Armada Music)
- Las Vegas '10 (2010, Armada Music)
- Prague '11 (2011, Armada Music)
- Los Angeles '12 (2012, Armada Music)
- Best of 2012: World Tour Compilation (15 December 2012)
- Buenos Aires '13 (2013, Armada Music)
- In Search of Sunrise 14 (with Gabriel & Dresden and Andy Moor) (2018, Songbird)
- In Search of Sunrise 15 (Mixed by Markus Schulz, Jerome Isma-Ae and Orkidea): (8 November 2019)
- In Search of Sunrise 16 (Mixed by Markus Schulz, Giuseppe Ottaviani and Sunlounger): (7 August 2020)
- In Search of Sunrise 17 (Mixed by Markus Schulz, Kryder and Kyau & Albert): (27 August 2021)
- In Search of Sunrise 18 (Mixed by Markus Schulz, Matt Fax and Dennis Sheperd): (2 September 2022)
- In Search of Sunrise 19 (Mixed by Markus Schulz, Ilan Bluestone and Daniel Wanrooy): (1 December 2023)

=== Singles ===
- 1998 Markus Schulz – "You Won’t See Me Cry"
- 1999 Dakota – "Swirl"
- 2002 Dakota – "Frozen Time"
- 2002 Dakota – "Lost in Brixton"
- 2002 Dakota – "Jah Powah"
- 2002 Dakota – "Zero Gravity"
- 2002 Dakota – "Sunshine Yellow"
- 2003 Dakota – "Abandoned in Queens"
- 2003 Markus Schulz presents Elevation – "Clear Blue"
- 2004 Markus Schulz presents Elevation – "Largo"
- 2004 Markus Schulz presents Elevation – "Somewhere"
- 2005 Markus Schulz featuring Anita Kelsey – "First Time"
- 2005 Markus Schulz and Departure with Gabriel & Dresden – "Without You Near"
- 2006 Markus Schulz featuring Carrie Skipper – "Never Be the Same Again"
- 2007 Markus Schulz vs. Chakra – "I Am"
- 2007 Markus Schulz – "Fly to Colors"
- 2007 Dakota – "Amsterdam"
- 2007 Dakota – "Progression"
- 2008 Dakota – "Hypnotic"
- 2008 Markus Schulz featuring Departure – "Cause You Know"
- 2008 Markus Schulz featuring Dauby – "Perfect"
- 2008 Markus Schulz vs. Andy Moor – "Daydream"
- 2008 Markus Schulz – "The New World"
- 2009 Dakota – "Chinook"
- 2009 Dakota – "Johnny the Fox"
- 2009 Dakota – "Sin City"
- 2009 Markus Schulz – "Do You Dream"
- 2009 Dakota – "Roxy ’84"
- 2009 Dakota – "Koolhaus"
- 2009 Dakota – "Steel Libido"
- 2009 Dakota – "Mr. Cappuccino"
- 2010 Markus Schulz featuring Khaz – "Dark Heart Waiting"
- 2010 Markus Schulz featuring Justine Suissa – "Perception"
- 2010 Markus Schulz – "Rain"
- 2010 Markus Schulz featuring Jennifer Rene – "Not the Same"
- 2010 Markus Schulz – "Future Cities"
- 2011 Dakota – "Sinners"
- 2011 Markus Schulz and Jochen Miller – "Rotunda"
- 2011 Dakota – "Sleepwalkers"
- 2011 Dakota – "Katowice"
- 2011 Dakota – "Saints"
- 2011 Dakota – "In a Green Valley"
- 2011 Markus Schulz – "Digital Madness (Transmission 2011)"
- 2012 Markus Schulz and Dennis Sheperd – "Go!"
- 2012 Markus Schulz and Ferry Corsten – "Loops & Tings"
- 2012 Markus Schulz and Adina Butar – "Caught"
- 2012 Markus Schulz and Seri – "Love Rain Down on Me"
- 2012 Markus Schulz and Ferry Corsten – "Stella"
- 2012 Markus Schulz featuring Ana Diaz – "Nothing Without Me"
- 2013 Armin van Buuren and Markus Schulz – "The Expedition"
- 2013 Markus Schulz – "The Spiritual Gateway (Transmission 2013 Theme)"
- 2013 New World Punx – "Romper"
- 2013 Markus Schulz and Sarah Howells – "Tempted"
- 2013 Markus Schulz – "Remember This"
- 2013 Markus Schulz and Elevation – "Machine of Transformation (Transmission 2013 Theme)"
- 2014 Dakota – "CLXXV"
- 2014 Markus Schulz – "Destino"
- 2014 Markus Schulz – "Seven Sins (Transmission 2013 Theme)"
- 2014 Markus Schulz featuring Lady V – "Winter Kills Me"
- 2015 Markus Schulz – "Golden Gate"
- 2015 Markus Schulz – "Bayfront"
- 2015 Markus Schulz – "Bine Facut"
- 2015 Markus Schulz – "This Generation"
- 2015 Markus Schulz featuring Delacey – "Destiny"
- 2015 Markus Schulz – "Lost in the Box"
- 2015 Markus Schulz with Vassy – "Tomorrow Never Dies"
- 2015 Markus Schulz – "Daybreak"
- 2015 Markus Schulz – "Avalon"
- 2015 Markus Schulz with Dakota – "Cathedral"
- 2015 Markus Schulz – "Dancing in the Red Light"
- 2015 Markus Schulz with Nifra – "The Creation (Transmission 2015 Theme)"
- 2015 Markus Schulz with Fisherman & Hawkins – "Gotham Serenade"
- 2016 Markus Schulz featuring Ethan Thompson – "Love Me Like You Never Did"
- 2016 Markus Schulz featuring Mia Koo – "Summer Dream"
- 2016 Markus Schulz – "Sesterius"
- 2016 Markus Schulz – "The Lost Oracle (Transmission 2016 Theme)"
- 2017 Markus Schulz featuring Brooke Tomlinson – "In the Night"
- 2017 Markus Schulz presents Dakota and Koan Groeneveld – "Mota-Mota"
- 2017 Markus Schulz presents Dakota featuring Bev Wild – "Running Up That Hill"
- 2017 Markus Schulz with Cosmic Gate – "AR"
- 2017 Markus Schulz presents Dakota – "In Search of Something Better"
- 2017 Markus Schulz featuring Adina Butar – "New York City [Take Me Away]"
- 2017 Markus Schulz presents Dakota – "The Spirit of the Warrior"
- 2018 Markus Schulz with Emma Hewitt – "Safe From Harm"
- 2018 Markus Schulz with JES – "Calling for Love"
- 2018 Markus Schulz with Sebu – "Upon My Shoulders"
- 2018 Markus Schulz featuring Nikki Flores – "We Are the Light"
- 2018 Markus Schulz – "The Awakening (Transmission 2018 Theme)"
- 2018 Markus Schulz Presents Afterdark Volume 1
- 2019 Markus Schulz featuring Christina Novelli – "Symphony of Stars"
- 2019 ATB and Markus Schulz – "Heartbeat"
- 2019 Markus Schulz and BT – "I Need Love"
- 2019 Markus Schulz and Haliene – "Ave Maria"
- 2019 Markus Schulz – "Sunrise Over the Bay"
- 2019 Markus Schulz – "Bells of Planaxis"
- 2019 Markus Schulz and Talla 2XLC – "Mainhattan"
- 2020 Markus Schulz and Adina Butar – "Indestructible"
- 2020 Markus Schulz and Daimy Lotus – "Are You With Me"
- 2020 Markus Schulz and Adina Butar – "In Search of Sunrise"
- 2020 Markus Schulz, London Thor and Valentino Alessandrini – "Feel Alive"
- 2020 Markus Schulz and Christian Burns – "Wait for You"
- 2021 Markus Schulz and Christina Novelli – "Not Afraid to Fall"
- 2021 Markus Schulz, Ethan Thompson and Soundland – "Make It Last Forever"
- 2021 Markus Schulz – "Escape"
- 2021 Markus Schulz – "Sunday Chords"
- 2021 Markus Schulz as Dakota – "Avalon 6AM"
- 2021 Markus Schulz and Paula Seling – "Endless Story"
- 2021 Markus Schulz as Dakota – "Tuluminati"
- 2022 Markus Schulz as Dakota – "Call of the Banshee"
- 2022 Markus Schulz as Dakota – "Manray"
- 2022 Markus Schulz as Dakota – "Vapour"
- 2022 Markus Schulz and BT – "Prestwick"

== Remixes ==
- 1993 Sagat – "Why Is It? Funk Dat"
- 1993 The Movement – "Shake That"
- 1994 2 Bad Mice – "Bomb Scare"
- 1994 Glenn "Sweet G" Toby – "I Can Tell"
- 1994 Sweet Sable – "Old Times' Sake"
- 1994 Transglobal Underground – "Temple Head"
- 1994 2 Unlimited – "Throw the Groove Down"
- 1994 Sandra Bernhard – "You Make Me Feel"
- 1995 Amber McFadden – "Do You Want Me"
- 1995 Truce – "Pump It"
- 1995 Real McCoy – "Come and Get Your Love"
- 1995 Bette Midler – "To Deserve You"
- 1995 Backstreet Boys – "We've Got It Going On"
- 1996 Lina Santiago – "Feels So Good (Show Me Your Love)"
- 1996 Backstreet Boys – "Get Down (You're the One for Me)"
- 1996 Technotronic – "Move It to the Rhythm"
- 1996 Madonna – "Love Don't Live Here Anymore"
- 1996 Liz Torres – "Set Yourself Free"
- 1996 Armand Van Helden – "The Funk Phenomena"
- 1996 James Newton Howard – "Theme from ER"
- 1996 Backstreet Boys – "We've Got It Going On"
- 1997 RuPaul – "A Little Bit of Love"
- 1997 Groove Junkies - "Everybody Needs to Be Loved"
- 1997 Poe – "Hello"
- 1997 e-N featuring Ceevox – "That Sound"
- 1997 Tilly Lilly – "Roller Coaster"
- 1997 Electronic – "Second Nature"
- 1997 Blue Amazon – "No Other Love"
- 1997 LNR – "Work It to the Bone"
- 1998 Cynthia – "If I Had the Chance"
- 1998 Vertigo Deluxe – "Out of My Mind"
- 1998 The B-52's – "Debbie"
- 1999 Everything but the Girl – "Lullaby of Clubland"
- 1999 Dream Traveler – "Time"
- 2000 Himmel – "Celebrate Life"
- 2000 Masters of Balance – "Dreamworld"
- 2000 Pablo Gargano – "Eurogoal"
- 2000 Poppin' Wheelies – "Spaced Out!"
- 2000 PQM – "The Flying Song"
- 2000 Aaron Lazarus – "Your Time Will Come"
- 2001 Pablo Gargano – "Absolution"
- 2001 Carissa Mondavi – "Solid Ground"
- 2001 Rouge – "Jingalay"
- 2001 Daniel Ash – "Burning Man"
- 2001 Fatboy Slim – "Sunset (Bird of Prey)"
- 2001 Luzon – "Manilla Sunrise"
- 2001 Book of Love – "I Touch Roses"
- 2002 Miro – "By Your Side"
- 2002 Télépopmusik – Breathe"
- 2003 Motorcycle – "As the Rush Comes"
- 2003 Jewel – "Intuition"
- 2003 Karada – "Last Flight"
- 2003 Billy Paul Williams – "So in Love"
- 2003 Jewel – "Stand"
- 2004 Aly & Fila – "Spirit of Ka"
- 2004 George Hales – "Autumn Falls"
- 2004 Solid Globe – "Sahara"
- 2004 Filterheadz – "Yimanya"
- 2004 Plastic Angel – "Distorted Reality"
- 2004 Clubbervision – "Dream Off"
- 2004 Kobbe and Austin Leeds – "Fusing Love"
- 2004 Airwave – "Ladyblue"
- 2004 Myth – "Millionfold"
- 2004 OceanLab – "Satellite"
- 2004 Piece Process – "Solar Myth (Markus Schulz Breaks Mix)"
- 2004 Space Manoeuvres – "Stage One"
- 2004 Deepsky – "Talk Like a Stranger"
- 2004 Whirlpool – "Under the Sun"
- 2004 Mark Otten – Tranquility"
- 2005 Tomonari and Tommy Pi – "C Sharp 2005"
- 2005 Ridgewalkers – "Find"
- 2005 Departure – "She Turns"
- 2005 Nalin and Kane – "Open Your Eyes (The Child You Are)"
- 2006 Kyau & Albert – "Are You Fine?"
- 2006 Eluna – "Severance"
- 2006 Yoshimoto – "Du What U Du"
- 2007 Kamera – "Lies"
- 2007 Andrew Bennett – "Menar"
- 2007 Joop – "The Future"
- 2008 Destination X – "Dangerous"
- 2008 John O'Callaghan featuring Audrey Gallagher – "Big Sky"
- 2008 Sia – "Buttons"
- 2008 Mike Foyle – "Bittersweet Nightshade"
- 2009 Dance 2 Trance – "Power of American Natives"
- 2009 Jester Music featuring Lavoie – "Dressed in White"
- 2009 Cosmic Gate – "Sign of the Times"
- 2009 Ferry Corsten – "Brain Box"
- 2010 Cosmic Gate – "The Drums"
- 2013 Venom One featuring Adina Butar – "Crashed and Burned"
- 2013 Daft Punk – "Alive (Markus Schulz Afterhours Remix)"
- 2013 Solarstone – "Solarcoaster"
- 2014 Capital Cities – "Safe and Sound (Markus Schulz vs. Grube and Hosvepian Remix)"
- 2014 Thirty Seconds to Mars – "City of Angels"
- 2014 Odesza – "Say My Name"
- 2015 Paul Oakenfold – "Hypnotized"
- 2015 Giorgio Moroder (featuring Sia) – "Déjà Vu"
- 2016 Hilight Tribe – "Free Tibet" (Markus Schulz vs. Arkham Knights)
- 2017 Linkin Park – "In the End (Chester Bennington Tribute Remix)"
- 2018 Giuseppe Ottaviani – "Ozone"
- 2018 Markus Schulz – "Safe From Harm (Markus Schulz In Bloom Remix)"
- 2018 Hans Zimmer – "The Blue Planet"
- 2020 Paul Oakenfold – "Southern Sun (Markus Schulz In Search of Sunrise Remix)"
- 2020 Ilan Bluestone presents Stoneblue featuring Emma Hewitt – "Hypnotized"
- 2020 Haliene – "Walk Through Walls"
