= Do You Dream? =

Studio album by Markus Schulz
- Released: June 15, 2010
- Genre: Trance
- Length: 77:53
- Label: Armada Music

Markus Schulz chronology
| Progression (2007) | Do You Dream? (2010) | Scream (2012) |

Singles from Do You Dream?
- 1. "Do You Dream?"; 2. "Dark Heart Waiting"; 3. "Perception"; 4. "Rain"; 5. "Not The Same"

Do You Dream? is the third album by Markus Schulz, released on June 15, 2010. Schulz worked on the album for over 18 months. Two other versions of the album were later released in 2011 by Armada Music, one an extended version of the original record while the other features remixes by other artists.

== Track list ==
1. "Alpha State" – 2:11
2. "Away" (featuring Sir Adrian) – 4:38
3. "Rain" – 4:24
4. "Dark Heart Waiting" (featuring Khaz) – 4:26
5. "Not the Same" (featuring Jennifer Rene) – 5:06
6. "Do You Dream?" (Uplifting Vocal Mix) – 7:36
7. "Last Man Standing" (featuring Khaz) – 3:58
8. "Surreal" (featuring Ana Criado) – 5:58
9. "Unsaid" (featuring Susana) – 3:43
10. "Lifted" (featuring Angelique Bergere) – 5:25
11. "Perception" (featuring Justine Suissa) – 6:02
12. "The New World" – 2:39
13. "Lightwave" (featuring Angelique Bergere) – 5:59
14. "65.4 Hz" – 4:51
15. "What Could Have Been" – 4:17
16. "Goodbye" (with Max Graham featuring Jessica Riddle) – 6:40

== Charts ==
| Chart (2010) | Peak position |
|---|---|
| Dutch Albums (Album Top 100) | 75 |
