= Monster Massive =

Halloween-themed music festival in Los Angeles, California

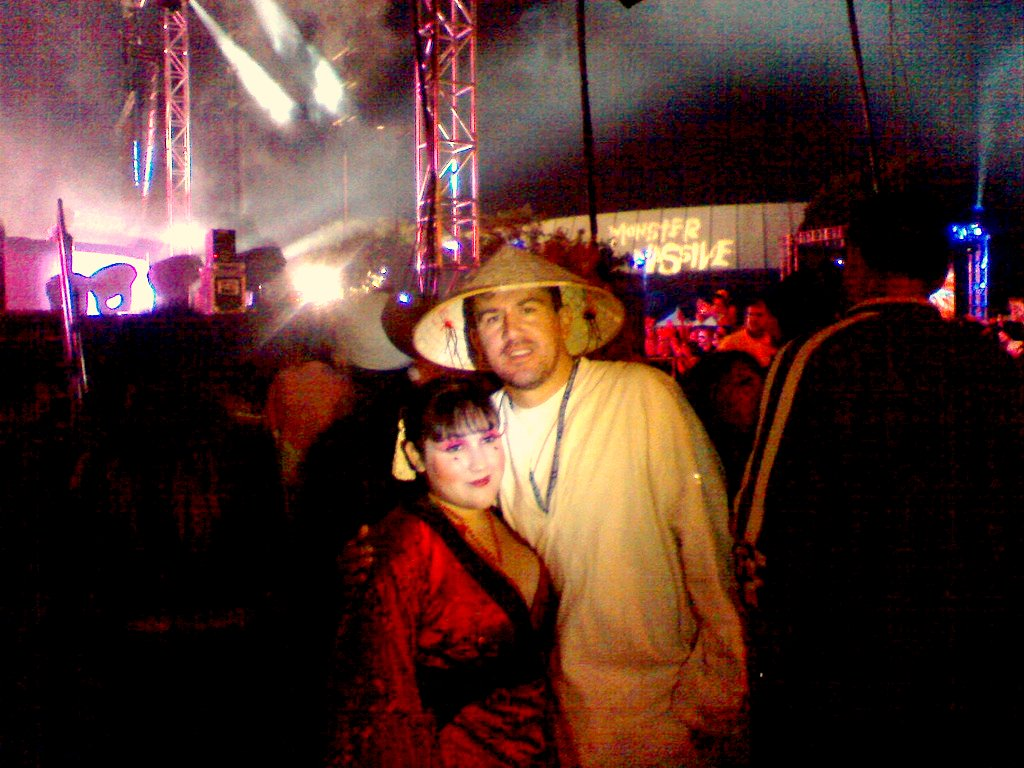
- Attendees in costume at Monster Massive 2009
- Genre: Trance Music; House Music; Dance Music; Electronic Dance Music; Techno; Drum and Bass
- Dates: Weekend of or weekend prior to Halloween night
- Locations: Los Angeles, California, United States
- Years active: 1998–2010
- Founders: Go ventures Interim CEO James Aguilar Jr.
- Website: Official website

Monster Massive was a Halloween-themed electronic music festival held annually on a weekend near Halloween at the Los Angeles Sports Arena in Los Angeles, California. Many of the attendees dressed in costume. The event was sponsored by Go Ventures.

Monster Massive was host to some of the biggest names in electronic dance music, including Paul Van Dyk, Armin Van Buuren, Deep Dish, Hernan Cattaneo, Carl Cox, John Digweed, Sasha, Felix Da Housecat, Armand Van Helden and many others.

== History ==
The first Monster Massive was held in 1997. In 2008 and 2009, Monster Massive had a reported 65,000 tickets sold, which would place it among the biggest dance festivals in North America. In 2010, the event was limited to ages 18 and over, due to the death of Sasha Rodriguez in June 2010 at the Electric Daisy Carnival, and attendance was only 16,000. In 2011, when Armin Van Buuren, Nero, and Erick Morillo were scheduled to perform, the event was canceled. In 2012, it was canceled just one day before it was scheduled to occur. It has not been rescheduled for 2013 and would appear to be defunct.

== Talent ==
Artists who performed at Monster Massive in previous years are listed below.

- AK1200
- Steve Angello
- Aphrodite
- Axwell
- Misstress Barbara
- Olav Basoski
- Benny Benassi
- LTJ Bukem
- Derrick Carter
- Hernan Cattaneo
- Chase & Status
- Antoine Clamaran
- Classixx
- Carl Cox
- Crystal Castles
- Felix Da Housecat
- Dan the Automator
- John Digweed
- Deep Dish
- DJ Funk
- DJ Reza
- DJ Spooky
- DJ SS
- DJ Swamp
- Gareth Emery
- Nic Fanciulli
- Adam Freeland
- Funk D'Void
- Fischerspooner
- Eddie "Flashin" Fowlkes
- Mark Grant
- Steve "Silk" Hurley
- Infected Mushroom
- Sebastian Ingrosso
- Junior Jack
- Judge Jules
- Steve Lawler
- Christopher Lawrence
- London Elektricity
- Derrick May
- Moby
- Behrouz Nazari
- John O'Callaghan
- Tall Paul
- Robbie Rivera
- Junior Sanchez
- Roger Sanchez
- Sasha
- Jesse Saunders
- Kevin Saunderson
- Anne Savage
- Markus Schulz
- Sub Focus
- Todd Terry
- Pete Tong
- Armand van Helden
- Paul van Dyk
- Richard Vission

== See also ==
- List of electronic music festivals
