= Debi Nova =

Costa Rican singer (born 1980)

- Nova at the 2026 Latin Grammy Awards

Background information
- Also known as: Debi Nova
- Born: Deborah Nowalski Kader; 6 August 1980 (age 46); San José, Costa Rica
- Origin: Escazú, Costa Rica
- Genres: Dance; pop; Latin
- Occupations: Singer; songwriter; dancer; activist
- Instruments: Vocals; piano; guitar; bass
- Years active: 2001–present
- Labels: Sony Latin; Decca
- Website: www.debinova.com/ (in Spanish and English)

Deborah Nowalski Kader (born 6 August 1980), better known by her stage name Debi Nova (Latin American Spanish pronunciation: [ˈdeβi ˈnoβa]), is a Costa Rican singer, songwriter, dancer and activist that is widely considered to be the most successful Costa Rican artist in the country's history. Nova first started as a backing vocalist for Gandhi, one of Costa Rica's biggest and most-beloved rock bands of the '90s and '00s. Her international music career began when she became a backing vocalist for Sérgio Mendes and Ricky Martin. She then collaborated with multiple artists, including the Black Eyed Peas, Mark Ronson and Sean Paul, and wrote songs for Orishas and RBD.

In 2004, she released her first solo single, "One Rhythm", which reached the top spot on Billboard's US Dance Club Songs Chart and was featured on the EA FIFA 2005 video game soundtrack. Since then, Debi has collaborated with other artists, including Franco de Vita, Ce'Cile, Fonseca, Sheila E., Vicente García, Gian Marco, Pedro Capó, Andrea Echeverri, and Tony Succar. She has also released five albums, three of which earned her Latin Grammy nominations for Best Contemporary Pop Vocal Album, Best Singer-Songwriter Album, Best Tropical Song, and Best Engineered Album, the latter of which she won. In 2020, she was nominated for Best Latin Pop or Urban Album at the 63rd Grammy Awards for her fourth album, 3:33, becoming the first Costa Rican artist ever to be nominated for a Grammy Award. She also holds the title of most streamed Costa Rican artist on Spotify.

== Early life ==
Debi was born on 6 August 1980 in Escazú, San José, Costa Rica and is of Polish Jewish descent. She is a second generation Costa Rican, as her grandparents immigrated to Costa Rica from Poland in the 1930s. She started playing piano at age four, and played classical music for ten years. She became a singer-songwriter and a multi-instrumentalist at the age of 14. She moved to Los Angeles at 17 when she signed her first record deal. She is a graduate of Los Angeles College of Music.

== Career ==
Nova started as a backing vocalist for Gandhi, with whom she had the chance to open for Deep Purple. She has also worked with Ricky Martin, with whom she recorded a Spanish version of the song "I Don't Care". Nova sang background vocals for Britney Spears in her song "Lace and Leather", from her album Circus.

In 2004 she scored the number one track on the US Dance Club Songs chart with "One Rhythm". A remix of the song was featured on the soundtrack for the EA Sports video game FIFA Football 2005.

She was featured in projects by Illa J (brother of J Dilla) and Sa-Ra as well as Urban Legend's Tropical Techniques.

On 20 April 2010, she made her US television debut on Dancing with the Stars. Nova also participated in the Colgate MaxWhite Charging Up The Music campaign.

She released her first studio album Luna Nueva in 2010, which featured her single "Drummer Boy".

In 2011, MTV Latin America awarded her the prize MTV Chiuku for her work in the United Nations campaign "UNITE to end violence against women" organized by UN Women, and in April 2012 she was named ambassador of YUNGA (Youth and United Nations Global Alliance).

Nova was one-third of the group "LR1" (Latinos are One) for a while, along with Jean Shepherd (of the electro-Latin funk band, Navegante) and Velcro. Their single "Maña y Corazón" was produced by Andres Levin and released on 13 September 2011, to kick off Latino Heritage Month.

Nova was selected as the official voice of the Central American Games, San José 2013, with the song "Arriba Arriba" (Get Up, Get Up) and was also invited to participate in the TEDx Joven Pura Vida (Youth Pure Life) conference, where she shared her story, her music and encouraged young people to follow their dreams.

On 17 December 2013, she released her EP Un Dia a la Vez. The project was entirely in Spanish and served as a preview for her next album, "SOY", which was released on 24 June 2014. The album was produced by Grammy-winning producer Cachorro López. The album released four singles, "Un Día A La Vez", "Amor", "Emergencia" and "Cupido". The latter was released in two versions, one featuring Puerto Rican singer Sie7e, and the other featured Jamaican Reggae/Dancehall singer Ce'Cile.

SOY was nominated at the 2014 Latin Grammy Awards in the Best New Vocal Pop Album category.

in 2016, Debi won the first season of Colombia's Version of Dancing with the Stars.

She released her third album Gran Ciudad in 2017, on Sony Music Latin for which she was nominated at the Latin Grammys 2017 in the category "Best Singer-Songwriter Album". She performed her single "No Nos Sobran Los Domingos" at the 2017 pre-Grammy show.

In May 2020 she released her album '3:33' after a series of concerts in Costa Rica. She was nominated at the 2020 Latin Grammys for Best Tropical Song for her song "Quédate" in collaboration with Pedro Capó and for Best Singer-Songwriter album for "3:33". The album was also nominated for Best Engineered Album, which ended up winning. Nova performed the song "3:33" at the main ceremony. On 24 November 2020, it was announced that Nova was nominated for Best Latin Pop or Urban Album at the 63rd Grammy Awards Ceremony, her first nomination at the awards.

== Discography ==
=== Studio albums ===
- Luna Nueva (2010)
- Soy (2014)
- Gran Ciudad (2017)
- 3:33 (2020)
- Dar Vida (2024)
- Todo Puede Convertirse en Canción (2025)

=== Singles ===
Year	Single	Peak chart positions					Album(s)
Year	Single	U.S. Hot 100	U.S. Hot Dance Singles Sales	U.S. Dance /Club Songs	U.S. Hot Dance Club Play	U.S. Tropical /Salsa	Album(s)
2004	"One Rhythm"	—	13	1	—	—	One Rhythm
2010	"Drummer Boy"	—	—	—	5	25	Luna Nueva

=== Participations ===
- 2002 : Won't You Stay by Norman Brown
- 2003 : Tomorrow by Mark Ronson
- 2004 : Appreciate by Boney James
- 2005 : Qué Más Da by Ricky Martin
- 2006 : Timeless by Sergio Mendes
- 2008 : Circus by Britney Spears
- 2014 : Latin Lovers

=== Collaborations ===
- 2003 : International Affair by Sean Paul
- 2003 : Latin Girls by The Black Eyed Peas
- 2005 : One Rhythm (Do Yard Riddim Mix), FIFA Football 2005
- 2011 : Si Quieres Decir Adiós de Franco De Vita
- 2012 : One Woman
- 2018 : Paradise de Barzo
- 2018 : Tú No Te Imaginas by Gian Marco
- 2020 : QTPC de BAMBI

=== Important Performances ===
- 2020: Latin Grammy Awards
- 2017: "Latin Grammy Pre-Show"
- 2017: "Sofar Songs from a Room & Amnesty International"
- 2016: "RiseUp AS ONE "
- 2015: "Dalai Lama's 80th Birthday"
- 2015: "South South Awards"
- 2014: "Sofar Songs from a Room"
- 2014: "Latin Grammy Person Of The Year"
- 2013: "TEDx Pura Vida"
- 2009: "Dancing With The Stars"
- 2010: "So You Think You Can Dance"
- 2010: "Despierta America"
- 2010: "LARAS"
- 2010: "World Youth Conference MX"
- 2007: "Miss Costa Rica"
- 2005: "Victoria's Secret Fashion Show (with Ricky Martin)"

=== Films featuring Debi Nova’s music ===
- 2017: Hombre de Fe: Al Frente
- 2016: First Lady of the Revolution: Guerrera
- 2015: Pr1mero de Enero: Volver a Comenzar
- 2015: Spare Parts: Guerrero (Fonseca ft. Debi Nova)
- 2011: From Prada to Nada: Need 2 B Loved
- 2006: Americano: Naturale
- 2005: Prime: Lay Low
- 2004: Mean Girls: Let Me Let Go

== Filmography ==
=== Film ===
Year	Title	Role
2016	Primero de Enero	Cameo

=== Television ===
Year	Title	Role	Notes
2010	So You Think You Can Dance	Guest	Performance
2011	Dancing with the Stars	Guest	Performance
2016	Bailando con las Estrellas Colombia	Herself	Winner
2016	Aspireist	Host	TV show

== Awards and nominations ==
Year	Nominated work	Category	Award	Result
2011	Herself	Breakout Artist of the Year	Premio Lo Nuestro	Nominated
2014	Soy	Best Contemporary Pop Vocal Album	Latin Grammy Awards	Nominated
2017	Gran Ciudad	Best Singer-Songwriter Album	Latin Grammy Awards	Nominated
2020	Quédate	Best Tropical Song	Latin Grammy Awards	Nominated
2020	3:33	Best Singer-Songwriter Album	Latin Grammy Awards	Nominated
2020	3:33	Best Engineered Album	Latin Grammy Awards	Win
2021	3:33	Best Latin Pop or Urban Album	Grammy Awards	Nominated

== See also ==
- List of number-one dance hits (United States)
- List of artists who reached number one on the US Dance chart
