= Bartosz Brenes =

Costa Rican DJ (born 1989)

- Also known as: Barzo
- Born: Bartosz Brenes; 25 July 1989 (age 37); San José, Costa Rica
- Origin: Brussels, Belgium
- Genres: House, EDM
- Occupations: DJ, record producer, songwriter, remixer
- Years active: 2006–present
- Label: Lácteo Cósmico
- Website: bartoszbrenes.com

Bartosz Brenes (Polish: [ˈbartɔʂ], Spanish: [ˈβɾenes], born 25 July 1989 in San José, Costa Rica) is a Costa Rican-born, Belgian chart-topping house DJ, producer, remixer and record label owner. He began his career as a DJ at the age of 16 in Belgium, and quickly started touring throughout Europe. Shortly after, Bartosz started producing electronic dance music using Ableton Live and by 2009, the 20-year-old had already established 17:44 Records. His 2010 single "Heaven" topped the Russian Music Charts for 73 consecutive weeks, peaking at #3 on the Russian Billboard chart. Since 2011, Bartosz has been commissioned to remix artists such as A-Trak, Amanda Wilson, Bob Sinclar, Boy George, David Vendetta, Dillon Francis, Eddie Amador, Gary Pine, Janelle Monáe, Jean Beauvoir, Joachim Garraud, Joe Smooth, Kurd Maverick, Olav Basoski, Perry Farrell, Ron Carroll, Sander Kleinenberg, Sophie Ellis-Bextor, Steve Edwards and Tommy Trash just to name a few. With over 100 productions (originals, remixes and ghost tracks) on labels like Armada, Defected, Dim Mak, Flamingo, Fool's Gold, Hed Kandi, Ministry of Sound, Nettwerk, Spinnin', Stealth or Subliminal, Bartosz quickly gathered the attention of high-profile DJ's including Tiësto, Dimitri Vegas & Like Mike, Knife Party, The Crystal Method, Paul Oakenfold, Alesso, Nicky Romero, Showtek, Cedric Gervais, Morgan Page, John Dahlbäck and Michael Woods. In 2012, Bartosz achieved popularity with his remix of "Breaking Up" by Chuckie, which became a mainstay on the Beatport top downloads charts for almost half a year.

== Discography ==
Year	Artist	Song	Record label
2008	Timofey & Bartosz Brenes	Dangerous Boy	Grooved Music
2008	Timofey & Bartosz Brenes	Feel My Love	Unlove Recordings
2008	Timofey & Bartosz Brenes	Skorogovorka	Unlove Recordings
2009	Timofey & Bartosz Brenes feat. Jerique	Don't You Know	Pool-E Music
2009	Timofey & Bartosz Brenes	Back For Love	Pool-E Music
2009	Timofey & Bartosz Brenes feat. Jerique	Hear My Call	Armada Music
2010	Timofey & Bartosz Brenes feat. Miss Autumn Leaves	Red Alert 2o1o	Spinnin' Records
2010	Timofey & Bartosz Brenes vs. Terri B	Heaven	Scream & Shout Recordings
2010	Timofey & Bartosz Brenes feat. Riya	Take Me Down	Be Yourself Music
2010	Timofey & Bartosz Brenes	Maui Wowie	17:44 Records
2010	Nick Mentes & Bartosz Brenes	Heat The Drums	Cr2 Records
2010	Bartosz Brenes & Nick Mentes feat. Dan'thony	Higher	17:44 Records
2010	Bartosz Brenes & Hell-Ektrik feat. Geyster	Not Over	17:44 Records
2011	Timofey & Bartosz Brenes	BOOTIK	17:44 Records
2012	BOOTIK feat. Christina Skaar	Ain't Gonna Fail	Yellow Productions
2012	Bartosz Brenes & Bicycle Corporation feat. Mr Eyez	Makes You High	GrooveTraxx
2012	BOOTIK, Tony Romera & Nick Mentes	Printemps 24	Elektrolicious
2012	Bartosz Brenes & Arno Grieco	Something About You	GrooveTraxx
2012	BOOTIK & Silvertongue	In My Head	Dim Mak Records
2012	Bartosz Brenes & Nino Anthony	#Poussez	17:44 Records
2012	Bartosz Brenes, Tony Romera & Corey Andrew	Open Your Eyes	Be Yourself Music
2012	BOOTIK feat. Max'C	Dance With Me	Ministry of Sound
2012	BOOTIK & Silvertongue	When The Music Stops	17:44 Records
2012	Bartouze with Antoine Cortez	Holy Funk EP	GrooveTraxx
2012	Bartosz Brenes & Dragmatic feat. Corey Andrew	Back In Time	ElectricDiscoPussy
2012	Bartouze with Solidisco	Dream Of You	PornoStar Records
2013	Adam Rickfors & Bartosz Brenes	Matsuri	RUN DBN
2013	Bartouze with Solidisco	Wanna Give	InStereo Recordings
2013	Bartosz Brenes & Dragmatic feat. Amrick Channa	Get Down	EMPO
2013	Dave Rose & Bartosz Brenes	Don't Be Playin	Tiger Records
2013	Bartosz Brenes & Adam Rickfors	Vodkafest	Nettrax
2013	Bartouze with Crazibiza	One Last Time	PornoStar Records
2013	Ludvig Holm & Bartosz Brenes	Play Free	Nettrax
2013	Bartouze with Grada	Manzana	PornoStar Records
2013	Fine Touch & Bartosz Brenes feat. Dane Bowers & Cormack	Embrace	Peak Hour Music
2013	Barjo	We Are Barjo EP	Disturbingly Loud
2013	Bartosz Brenes & Massive Ditto	Seoulful	Moon Records
2013	BETABOM x Huba	One Finger	betabomúsica
2014	Bartosz Brenes & Adam Rickfors feat. Anthony Mills	Blue Suede Shoes	17:44 Records
2014	Bartouze with Richard Grey	Beat Goes On	G*High
2014	BETABOM x Cocofunka	Donde Vamos	betabomúsica
2014	Bass Kleph & Bartosz Brenes	Let's Get Right	Tiger Records
2014	Bartouze with Tom Forester	14 Reasons	G*High
2015	Bartouze with Richard Grey	Sweet Life	G*High
2015	Bartosz Brenes & Adam Rickfors	California Vibe	17:44 Records
2015	Bartouze with DJ Dan	Jukebox	GrooveTraxx
2016	Barzo	Albor	Lácteo Cósmico
2017	Barzo	Brío	Lácteo Cósmico
2018	Barzo feat. Debi Nova	Paradise	Lácteo Cósmico
2019	Barzo feat. Gary Nesta Pine	Rize Again	Lácteo Cósmico
2019	Barzo	100% Barztep	Lácteo Cósmico

=== Remixes ===
Year	Artist	Song	Record label
2008	Ian Kane & Funkerocca	Dirty One (Timofey & Bartosz Brenes Remix)	Grooved Music
2008	Gigi Barocco	Chapa (Timofey & Bartosz Brenes Remix)	Second Session
2008	Pink Computer	Inside My Soul (Timofey & Bartosz Brenes Remix)	Somekind Records
2008	Geyster	Come My Direction (Timofey & Bartosz Brenes Remix)	Somekind Records
2008	The Maneken	What I Feel For You (Timofey & Bartosz Brenes Remix)	Somekind Records
2008	Reead	I'm The Same (Timofey & Bartosz Brenes Remix)	Roll Records
2009	Brian Arc & Jeremy Kalls	Let You Down (Timofey & Bartosz Brenes Remix)	Pool-E Music
2009	Alan Pride	Shine (Timofey & Bartosz Brenes Remix)	Njoy Records
2009	Livyo feat. Geyster	Why (Timofey & Bartosz Brenes Remix)	17:44 Records
2009	Reead feat. Lina	Nobody's Innocent (Timofey & Bartosz Brenes Remix)	Roll Records
2009	Marc Mysterio feat. Gary Pine	Sunshine (Timofey & Bartosz Brenes Remix)	Hi-Bias Records
2009	Mademoiselle Luna	Want You To Be Mine (Timofey & Bartosz Brenes Remix)	Gun Records
2010	Reead	Straight In The Eyes (Timofey & Bartosz Brenes Remix)	Roll Records
2010	Tiko's Groove vs. Laura Finocchiaro	Avoar (Timofey & Bartosz Brenes Remix)	Building/Stealth
2010	Perry Farrell	Calling Her (Timofey & Bartosz Brenes Remix)	Sony Music
2010	Geyster	When I Touch The Blue (Timofey & Bartosz Brenes Remix)	Somekind Records
2010	Laurent Simeca & Stephan M	Roxanne (Timofey & Bartosz Brenes Remix)	Nero Records
2010	D.O.N.S. feat. Jerique	Groove On (Timofey & Bartosz Brenes Remix)	Kontor Records
2010	Carl Kennedy & Tommy Trash feat. Rosie Henshaw	Blackwater (Timofey & Bartosz Brenes Remix)	Subliminal Records
2010	Etienne Ozborne vs. Peter Brown feat. Steven Taetz	Back Together (Timofey & Bartosz Brenes Remix)	Housesession Records
2010	Chris Montana & Etienne Ozborne feat. Polina Griffith	Don't Give It Up (Bartosz Brenes & Nick Mentes Remix)	Housesession Records
2010	Gabi Newman & Liz Mugler feat. Linda Newman	The Best Day (Bartosz Brenes & Nick Mentes Remix)	Feel The8
2010	Nino Anthony	Day Muzik (Bartosz Brenes & Nick Mentes Remix)	17:44 Records
2010	Bicycle Corporation	All That Swing (Timofey & Bartosz Brenes Remix)	17:44 Records
2010	Mac Monroe	Roll With You (Bartosz Brenes & Nick Mentes Remix)	Victauril Records
2010	Redroche & Olav Basoski feat. Amanda Wilson	Not Over You (Bartosz Brenes & Nick Mentes Remix)	Eyezcream Recordings
2010	Tim Royko feat. Kediva	Dreamer (Bartosz Brenes, Timofey & Nick Mentes Remix)	Tiger Records
2010	Bastian Foxx feat. Frida Harnesk	What You Want (Bartosz Brenes & Nick Mentes Remix)	Safari Music
2011	Redroche vs. Armstrong	Make Your Move 2011 (Bartosz Brenes, Timofey & Nick Mentes Remix)	Eyezcream/Hed Kandi
2011	Timofey & Sue Cho	Go Berzerk (BOOTIK Remix)	17:44 Records
2011	Joachim Garraud, Dabruck & Klein feat. DJ Roland Clark	Stop (BOOTIK vs. Nick Mentes Remix)	ZeMixx
2011	Joachim Garraud feat. DJ Roland Clark	Bang Bang (Timofey & Bartosz Brenes Remix)	ZeMixx
2011	Boy George	Turn To Dust (BOOTIK Remix)	Decode Records
2011	Andy S, Raffaell & Lauren Rose	Where I Wanna Be (BOOTIK Remix)	Decode Records
2012	Marc Vedo & Boy George feat. DesiSlava	Kalino Mome (BOOTIK Remix)	VG Records
2012	BOOTIK, Tony Romera & Nick Mentes	Printemps 24 (Barjo Remix)	Elektrolicious
2012	Tony Romera & Jordan Viviant	Robotweet (BOOTIK Remix)	Elektrolicious
2012	Jonathan Landossa	Analog Monster (Barjo Remix)	Elektrolicious
2012	Steve Edwards, Joe Smooth & Louis Botella	Promised Land (BOOTIK Remix)	Decode Records
2012	Jean Beauvoir	Feel The Heat (Barjo Remix)	17:44 Records
2012	PANG!	Another Day (BRTSZ & Mario Miranda Remix)	WL77
2012	Bob Sinclar & Sophie Ellis-Bextor	Fuck With You (BOOTIK Remix)	Yellow Productions
2012	Gum Me	Sweaty Shirts (Bartosz Brenes & Tony Romera Remix)	Flamingo Recordings
2012	Redroche	Your Life (Barjo Remix)	Eyezcream Recordings
2012	David Vendetta feat. Booty Luv	Sun Comes Up (Tony Romera & Bartosz Brenes Remix)	DJ Center
2012	Louis Botella feat. Vuk Lazar	Poison Sound (Nick Mentes & Bartosz Brenes Remix)	Exklusive Records
2012	Reead	Come On (Barjo Remix)	Roll Records
2012	Ludvig Holm & Filip Jenven	Undermine (BRTSZ & Arno Grieco Remix)	Natura Viva
2012	Dragmatic	Leave A Message (Nick Mentes & Bartosz Brenes Remix)	Dancemania Recordings
2012	R.O.N.N vs. Danny Boy	Twisted (Bartosz Brenes & Nick Mentes Remix)	ElectricDiscoPussy
2012	Joachim Garraud & Alésia	Atrium (Tony Romera & Bartosz Brenes Remix)	Dim Mak Records
2012	Mr. Vasovski	Cable (Bartouze with Le Babar Mix)	GrooveTraxx
2012	Tune Brothers & Jolly feat. Tesz Millan	Every Move (Bartosz Brenes & Nick Mentes Remix)	Housesession Records
2012	Chuckie & Promise Land feat. Amanda Wilson	Breaking Up (Bartosz Brenes & Tony Romera Remix)	Cr2/BigBeat
2012	BOOTIK feat. Max'C	Dance With Me (Tony Romera & Bartosz Brenes Remix)	Ministry of Sound
2012	Ron Carroll	Bump 2 Dis (Bartosz Brenes & Dragmatic Remix)	Spinnin' Records
2012	A-Trak & Dillon Francis	Money Makin' (Barjo & Alban Lipp Remix)	Fool's Gold Records
2013	Plastik Funk & Kurd Maverick	Say Hello (Madax & Bartosz Brenes Remix)	Tiger Records
2013	Sander Kleinenberg	Get It Together (Bartosz Brenes & Adam Rickfors Remix)	This Is Recordings
2013	Pink Fluid feat. Jarell Perry	Dying Tonight (Bartosz Brenes & Dragmatic Remix)	Molto Recordings
2013	Nyx Syrinx Nelio feat. Lisa Rowe	Home (Dragmatic & Bartosz Brenes Remix)	Vicious Recordings
2013	Eddie Amador	I Don't Trip (Bicycle Corporation & Bartosz Brenes Remix)	Suka Records
2013	Adam Rickfors feat. Marylin	Colors (Dragmatic & Bartosz Brenes Remix)	Playground Music
2013	BOOTIK & Silvertongue	In My Head (Bartosz Brenes & Adam Rickfors Remix)	Dim Mak
2013	Titanoz feat. BBK	Dance Like This (Bartosz Brenes & Dragmatic Remix)	EMPO
2013	Sem Thomasson feat. Jason Caeser	Today (Fine Touch & Bartosz Brenes Remix)	Flamingo Recordings
2013	Bass Kleph	Going Crazy (Adam Rickfors & Bartosz Brenes Remix)	WePLAY
2013	Jose Spinnin vs. Security	Every Breath You Take (Bartosz Brenes & Dragmatic Remix)	EMPO
2013	Lazy Rich & Hirshee feat. Amba Shepherd	Damage Control (Barjo Remix)	Big Fish Recordings
2013	DJ Exodus & Leewise	We Are Your Friends (Barjo Remix)	Peak Hour Music
2013	Medina	Miss Decibel (Adam Rickfors & Bartosz Brenes Remix)	EMI Sweden
2013	Burak Yeter feat. Dawn Richard	Speed Of Light (Bartosz Brenes & Fine Touch Remix)	Connection Records
2013	Janelle Monáe feat. Erykah Badu	QUEEN (Barjo Remix)	Atlantic Records
2013	EC Twins, Lea Luna & Nejat Barton	Hot Summer Nights (Exodus & Bartosz Brenes Remix)	Magik Muzik/Black Hole Recordings
2017	Debi Nova	Gran Ciudad (Barzo Remix)	Sony Music Latin
2018	Nakury	Necesario (Barzo Remix)	Lácteo Cósmico
2019	Richard Grey	Gravity (Barzo Remix)	Love Sound Recordings

== Peak chart positions ==
Year	Chart	Peak position	Title
2010	Russian Billboard Chart	#3	Timofey & Bartosz Brenes vs. Terri B! - Heaven
2010	Russian Top Hit (Radio Airplay Chart)	#4	Timofey & Bartosz Brenes vs. Terri B! - Heaven
2010	Belgium Ultratop 50 Dance	#24	Timofey & Bartosz Brenes feat. Miss Autumn Leaves - Red Alert 2o1o (Club Mix)
2010	Belgium iTunes Top 100 Dance	#27	Timofey & Bartosz Brenes feat. Miss Autumn Leaves - Red Alert 2o1o (Club Mix)
2010	Beatport Top 100 Tech House	#84	Nick Mentes & Bartosz Brenes - Heat The Drums (Original Mix)
2012	The Beatport Top 10 (Main Chart)	#3	Chuckie & Promise Land feat. Amanda Wilson - Breaking Up (Bartosz Brenes & Tony Romera Remix)
2012	Beatport Top 100 Electro House	#1	Chuckie & Promise Land feat. Amanda Wilson - Breaking Up (Bartosz Brenes & Tony Romera Remix)
2012	Beatport Top 100 Electro House	#43	Joachim Garraud & Alésia - Atrium (Tony Romera & Bartosz Brenes Remix)
2012	Beatport Top 100 Electro House	#46	Redroche - Your Life (Barjo Remix)
2012	Beatport Top 100 House	#36	Bartouze with Solidisco - Dream of You (Original Mix)
2012	Beatport Top 100 House	#83	Bartouze with Antoine Cortez - Holy Funk (B-Side Mix)
2013	Beatport Top 100 House	#31	Bartouze with Solidisco - Wanna Give (Original Mix)
2013	Beatport Top 100 House	#75	Dave Rose & Bartosz Brenes - Don't Be Playin (Original Mix)
2013	Beatport Top 100 Glitch Hop	#32	Barjo - Tantrum (Original Mix)
2014	Beatport Top 100 House	#13	Bartouze with Richard Grey - Beat Goes On (Original Mix)
2014	The Beatport Top 100 (Main Chart)	#94	Bartouze with Richard Grey - Beat Goes On (Original Mix)
2014	Beatport Top 100 Pop / Rock	#57	BETABOM x Cocofunka - Donde Vamos
2014	Costa Rica iTunes Top 100 Dance	#3	BETABOM x Cocofunka - Donde Vamos
2014	Top 10 Nacional Música Claro Costa Rica	#1	BETABOM x Cocofunka - Donde Vamos

== Music videos ==
Year	Title	Director(s)	Record label
2009	Timofey & Bartosz Brenes feat. Jerique - "Hear My Call"	Dancefoundation	Armada Music
2014	BETABOM x Cocofunka - "Donde Vamos"	Alejandro Bonilla Alonso Fonseca	betabomúsica
2016	Barzo - "You"	Isaac Abarca	Lácteo Cósmico
2018	Barzo feat. Debi Nova - "Paradise"	.nine	Lácteo Cósmico
