= Soy (Debi Nova album) =

Studio album by Debi Nova
- Released: 2014
- Genre: Latin pop, dance
- Length: 38:52
- Label: Sony Music Entertainment

Debi Nova chronology
Luna Nueva (2010)	Soy (2014)	Gran Ciudad (2017)

Soy is the second studio album by Costa Rican singer-songwriter Debi Nova. The album began production in 2012, and was released in June 2014. The tracks "Un Día a la Vez", "Amor" and "Emergencia" were released as singles. The official music video for the latter song was filmed in Chile on July 13, 2014.

== Release and promotion ==
The album was released in 2014 as Nova's second studio album. Three singles were released from the album onto mainstream radio. The album got Nova to receive her first Latin Grammy nomination. After this, Nova began touring with Puerto Rican singer Ricky Martin in order to promote the album. Nova said she wanted to back up her nomination by promoting her music as a fusion of pop with roots and dance hall like this album was especially in the song One Reason.

== Commercial performance ==
The album had success in Latin America and received a nomination for Best Contemporary Pop Vocal Album at the 15th Latin Grammy Awards, making it the first time Nova was nominated for a Latin Grammy.

== Track listing ==
1. Revolución
2. Amor
3. Cupido (Feat. Ce'Cile)
4. Un Día a la Vez
5. La Tormenta
6. Emergencia
7. Por Última Vez (Feat. Franco De Vita)
8. No Me Digas Nada
9. Vámonos de Akí
10. Hasta el Fin
11. Soy
12. Emergency (Emergencia English Version, Hidden Track)

== Accolades ==
15th Latin Grammy Awards

Year	Nominee / work	Award	Result
2014	Soy	Best Contemporary Pop Vocal Album	Nominated
