= Vertigo Deluxe =

Vertigo Deluxe is a Los Angeles-based music production team consisting of Matthew Ferry and Roger Wade. They began in 1996 releasing a variety of Trance music and Electronica singles with modest success. In August 2002 they released a self-titled debut CD on their own Tranquility Recordings label. The new sound contained many elements of the Chill out music and Downtempo genres.

Their most notable success was co-writing the song "You Won't See Me Cry" with artist/DJ Markus Schulz, which spent 9 weeks on the Billboard magazine Dance Club Play charts in 1999, peaking for 3 weeks at #38.
