= Scream (Markus Schulz album) =

Studio album by Markus Schulz
- Released: August 31, 2012
- Genre: Trance
- Length: 79:25
- Label: Armada Music

Markus Schulz chronology
Do You Dream? (2010)	Scream (2012)	Scream 2 (2014)

Singles from Scream
- 1. "Caught" Released: July 9, 2012; 2. "Love Rain Down" Released: September 10, 2012; 3. "Nothing Without Me" Released: November 26, 2012; 4. "Tempted" Released: July 1, 2013

Scream is the fourth album by German trance producer & DJ Markus Schulz, released on August 31, 2012 by Armada Music. Scream represents a change in Markus Schulz's production style from deeper trance tracks produced since Do You Dream? to more club orientated trance tracks, which are widely featured throughout the entirety of Scream.

== Track listing ==
No.	Title	Length
1.	"Our Moment" (Intro Mix)	1:36
2.	"Loops & Tings" (vs Ferry Corsten)	6:18
3.	"Nothing Without Me" (featuring Ana Díaz)	5:27
4.	"Love Rain Down" (featuring Seri)	4:28
5.	"Carry On" (featuring Jaren)	4:37
6.	"Deep in the Night" (featuring Fiora)	4:37
7.	"Caught" (featuring Adina Butar)	5:03
8.	"Triotonic" (with Elevation and KhoMha)	3:05
9.	"Soul Seeking"	2:39
10.	"Sing Me Back to Life" (featuring Aruna)	5:02
11.	"Don't Leave Before the Sunrise"	3:09
12.	"Until It's Gone" (featuring Trevor Guthrie)	4:02
13.	"Universe Is Mine" (featuring Adina Butar)	4:06
14.	"Tempted" (featuring Sarah Howells)	4:18
15.	"Absolution" (featuring Mark Frisch)	4:17
16.	"I Like It" (featuring Khaz & E.L.I.)	4:29
17.	"Digital Madness"	4:51
18.	"Scream" (featuring Ken Spector)	4:10
19.	"Finish Line" (featuring Elevation)	3:11
Total length:		79:25

Bonus Tracks version
No.	Title	Length
20.	"Push the Button" (With Mr. Pit)	3:46
21.	"Go!" (With Dennis Sheperd)	3:30
22.	"Karbon" (With Arnej)	4:08
23.	"Silence to the Call" (With Wellenrausch)	4:20

== Charts ==
Chart (2012)	Peak position
Dutch Albums (Album Top 100)	12
