= Drummer Boy (Debi Nova song) =

Single by Debi Nova

from the album Luna Nueva
- Released: January 7th 2010
- Genre: Pop, dance
- Length: 3:09
- Songwriter(s): Leah Haywood, Daniel James, Debi Nova

Debi Nova singles chronology
""One Rhythm"" (2004)	"Drummer Boy" (2010)	"Un Día A La Vez" (2014)

"Drummer Boy" is the first single released from the debut album of Costa Rican singer-songwriter Debi Nova, Luna Nueva (2010).

== Charts ==
Chart (2010)	Peak position
U.S. Billboard Hot Dance Club Play	5
US Dance/Electronic Digital Songs Sales (Billboard)	15
US Tropical Airplay (Billboard)	25
