= DBN (band) =

German band

- Genres: dance music
- Years active: 2004–present
- Members: Djani Dzihan; Tobias Hahn; Patrick Kroepels
- Website: www.dbn-music.com

DBN is a German artist and record producer trio from Hamburg. Its members are Djani Dzihan, Tobias Hahn, Patrick Kroepels.

== Biography ==
DBN's remix of John Dahlbäck's Everywhere and the single The Nighttrain were released in 2007. After various productions and remixes for Sebastian Ingrosso, EDX, Eddie Thoneick, Roger Sanchez, Bob Sinclar, Erick Morillo, Dirty South, Steve Angello, Laidback Luke, Wippenberg, Jean Elan and 2raumwohnung, DBN released their single Asteroidz. This was followed by Jack Is Back, which reached number 1 in the German dance charts). My Belief, which they made with Syke'n'Sugarstarr and Cosmo Klein, also topped the German dance charts, as did Chicago. For these, DBN was recognised as the "Top Single Act National 2010".

In the recent past, DBN have worked on remixes for Tim Berg, Norman Doray and Sebastien Drums, Nalin & Kane, Medina, Danny Freakazoid and German pop acts Ich+Ich, made the singles Bomjacker, Buckshee, and made Sushi EP with Patric la Funk.

== Discography ==
=== Singles ===
Release	Title	Artist	Label
2005	Rocket Powder	DBN	Slopshop Records
2007	Boys'n'Girls / Fuji Moto	DBN	Sugaspin Records
2007	The Nighttrain feat. Kadoc	D.O.N.S. & DBN	Joia Records
2008	The Nighttrain feat. Kadoc (Vocal Version)	D.O.N.S. & DBN	Kingdom Kome Cuts
2009	Asteroidz feat. Madita	DBN	Yoshitoshi Records
2009	Stars feat. Michael Feiner	DBN & Tommy Trash	We Play
2009	Jack is back	DBN	We Play
2009	My belief feat. Cosmo Klein	Syke'n'Sugarstarr & DBN	We Play
2009	Delta	DBN & Neon Stereo	Hussle Recordings
2010	Chicago	DBN	We Play
2010	Bomjacker	DBN & Tommy Trash	We Play
2010	Buckshee	DBN	Toolroom
2010	Sushi EP	DBN & Patric la Funk	We Play
2011	All my life	DBN	We Play
2011	Redemption feat. Rosie Henshaw	DBN & Matty Menck	Nero Recordings
2011	Le Freak / La Funk feat. Shena	DBN pres. Tom Shark	Strictly Rhythm
2012	Gimme Gimme feat. Madita	DBN vs. Darwin & Backwall	Yoshitoshi Records
2012	Remedy feat. Sean Declase	DBN & Stafford Brothers	Flamingo Recordings
2012	Always have tonight feat. Jason Caesar	DBN	We Play
2012	Gotta get thru this feat. Oni Sky	DBN	Mixmash Records

=== Remixes (selection) ===
- ICH UND ICH: Universum (DBN Remix)
- EDX: Rubin (DBN Remix)
- Patric La Funk: Yeah (DBN Remix)
- Haji & Emanuel featuring Roachford: In The Moment (DBN Remix)
- Francesco Diaz & Young Rebels: Alaska (DBN Remix)
- Steve Angello & Laidback Luke ft. Robin S.: Show Me Love (DBN Remix)
- Norman Doray & Tristan Garner: Last Forever (DBN Remix)
- DJ DLG & Erick Morillo: Where Are You Now (D.O.N.S. & DBN Remix)
- Dirty South feat. Rudy: Let It Go (D.O.N.S. & DBN Remix)
- Milk & Sugar: No No No (D.O.N.S. & DBN Remix)
- Roger Sanchez: Release Yo' Self (D.O.N.S. & DBN Remix)
- Bob Sinclar pres. Fireball: What I Want (D.O.N.S. & DBN Dub)
- Eddie Thoneick: Freak 'N You (D.O.N.S. & DBN Remix)
- Those Usual Suspects: Greece 2000 (D.O.N.S. & DBN Remix)
- John Dahlbäck: Blink (D.O.N.S. & DBN Chainsaw Remix)
- John Dahlbäck: Everywhere (D.O.N.S. meets DBN In The Box)
- Nalin & Kane: Beachball 2010 (DBN Remix)
- 2Raumwohnung: Rette Mich Später (DBN Remix)

== Commissional Works ==
- Niki Belucci: Get Up (D.O.N.S. & DBN Mix)
- Greg Cerrone: Invincible (D.O.N.S. Remix)

== Radio and Podcast ==
- Delicious Housetunes (resident)
- Bash FM (resident)
- Radio FG Underground
- DBN-Podcast at iTunes (monthly)
- DBN loves... (weekly radio show)

== Awards ==
- Top Single Act National 2010 (German Dance Charts)
- Various top-5-rankings in the German Dance- and Club-Charts
