= Luna Nueva (Debi Nova album) =

Studio album by Debi Nova
- Released: May 18, 2010
- Genre: Latin pop, Dance
- Length: 38:49
- Label: Decca Label Group
- Producer: Gustavo Santaolalla

Debi Nova chronology
Luna Nueva (2010)	Soy (2014)

Singles from Luna Nueva
- 1. "Drummer Boy" Released: 2010

Professional ratings
Review scores
Source	Rating
Allmusic	3.5/5 stars

Luna Nueva (New Moon) is the debut album by Costa Rican singer-songwriter and dancer Debi Nova. It was released on May 18, 2010. The first single from the album was titled "Drummer Boy". The album was produced by the Gustavo Santaolalla.

The album has 10 tracks, all of them co-written by Debi. The EPK of the album is available on her YouTube channel and on her official web site. Louis Biancaniello, Sam Watters, Greg Kurstin and Beto Cuevas (formerly of Chilean group La Ley) are among the writers who participated in the songwriting. The album has a collaboration with Citizen Cope on track nine. Most of the album's tracks are in English, but it includes some tracks in Spanish and Spanglish.

== Track listing ==
No.	Title	Length
1.	"Need 2 B Loved"	4:21
2.	"We Were Young"	3:08
3.	"Corazón Abierto"	4:11
4.	"Drummer Boy"	3:09
5.	"Ashes & Pearls"	3:59
6.	"Calle Sin Salida"	3:32
7.	"Rather Be Your Lover"	3:14
8.	"Don't Wanna Forget"	4:52
9.	"Something to Believe In (Feat. Citizen Cope)"	4:58
10.	"Vete de Mi"	3:25

== Charts ==
Chart (2010)	Peak position
US Billboard Top Heatseekers Albums	22
