= Donald Glaude =

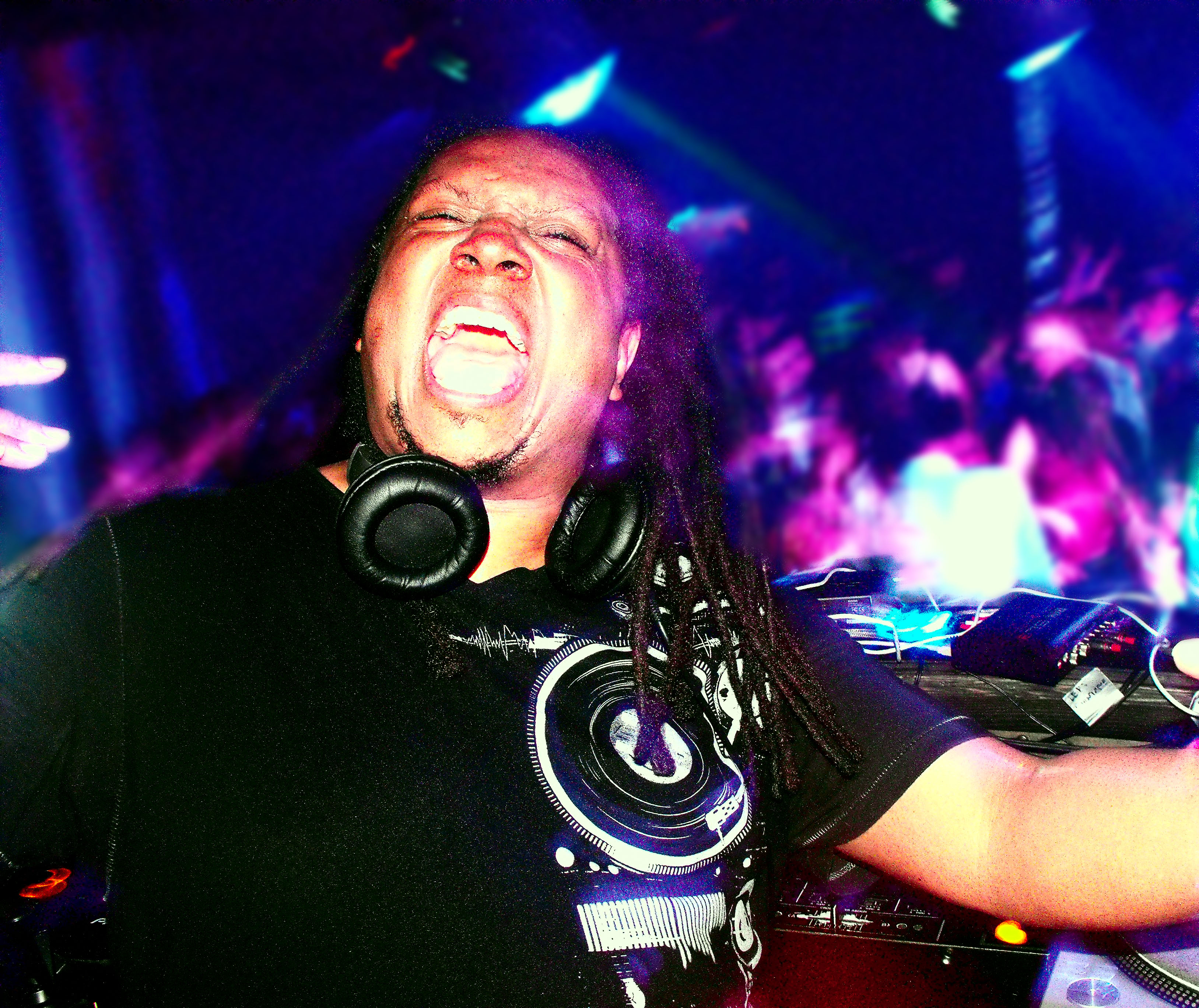
- Donald Glaude, 2011

Background information
- Origin: Tacoma, Washington
- Genres: House
- Occupation(s): Musical artist, DJ, remixer
- Years active: 1992–present

Donald Glaude is an American house music artist, DJ and remixer, and is consistently ranked as one of DJ Mag's top 100 DJs.

== Biography ==
As a child, Glaude was classically trained in the upright bass and violin. After hearing early funk records as a child, he began experimenting with tape decks and a primitive Radio Shack mixer at home in Tacoma, Washington. Glaude began playing at nightclubs by the mid-1980s and began gaining name recognition in early turntablism. He had an early residency at 6th & Proctor in Tacoma, WA. In the early 1990s when the rave scene took hold up and down the west coast Glaude had a Friday residency at the Underground nightclub in Seattle. He also frequently headlined at rave warehouse parties such as NAF Studios in West Seattle. Other early Seattle electronic music clubs Glaude played in those early days included The Power Plant, Vinylized, the Catwalk and the Jungle. His club nights showcased many now famous DJs from around the world. Glaude, along with Funky Techno Tribe: DJ Dan in San Francisco and Ron D Core in Los Angeles helped define west-coast house music through the 1990s.

Donald Glaude is a pioneer of House Music with a very distinctive deep bass rhythm sound and occasional breaks in the music where Glaude shouts enthusiastically, getting the crowd pumped up. He has been living in the Southern California area for some time. He has put out multiple records of his own songs and vanity labels Durty Records and Eden Records targeted to professional DJs while making digital releases on Beatport.

Glaude also caused some stir in 2005 and 2006 with his Friday night residency at ICE Nightclub in Las Vegas called 'Thank Glaude It's Friday'. Donald and his night were showcased regularly on the Spike TV reality show 'The Club'.

== Discography ==
=== Singles & EP's ===
- Sampling The Future (1997)
- Off the Hook (1999)
- Mixed Live (2001)
- Get Up (2003)
- Mixed Live 2nd Session (2003)
- This Is Me (2005)
- For The People (2006)
- Live at Ruby Skye (2007)
- BIG (2007)
- Stick Em (2008)
- Let The Bass Drop (2008)
- It Was a Party Line (2009)
- Drive Me Crazy (2009)
- Teed Off (2009)
- Break it Off (2010)
- Becky (2010)
- Kick Drum (2010)
- Climb (2010)
- Keyz of Destruction (2010)

== Remixes ==
- Steal Your Bike (2005)
- Madd Disco (2007)
- Get Hott (2007)
- Give it to Me (2007)
- Darke (2007)
- Ride It (2007)
- New Nation (2008)
- A Dee Jay (2008)
- The 7/10 Split (2008)
- Roller Coaster (2008)
- Hear No Evil (2009)
- This Shit is Jackin (2009)
- Knocker'd Out (2009)
- Activate (2009)
- Feel The Jam (2009)
- Cruelty (2009)
- Break it Off (2010)
- 4am in Vegas (2010)
- Carpet Muncher (2010)
- Wonderland (2010)
- Beats inside my head

== Filmography ==
- LA DJ (2004)
- Peace Love and Beats (2004)
- Put The Needle On The Record (2006)
