= DJ Dan =

American DJ and producer (1968–2026)

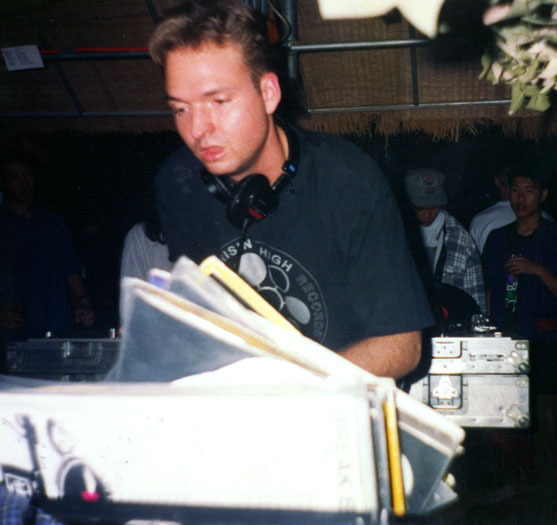
- DJ Dan in 1994

Background information
- Born: Daniel Wherrett; July 8, 1968; Olympia, Washington, U.S.
- Died: March 28, 2026 (aged 57)
- Genres: House; funky house; electro house; breakbeat; techno; tech house; electronica
- Occupations: Disc jockey; record producer
- Years active: 1991–2026
- Label: InStereo Recordings
- Website: djdan.com

Daniel Wherrett (July 8, 1968 – March 28, 2026), known by his stage name DJ Dan, was an American house DJ and producer.

== Life and career ==
Wherrett was born in Olympia, Washington, on July 8, 1968, and grew up in Lacey, Washington. He moved to Seattle from 1988 to 1990 to study fashion, where he discovered electronic dance music at clubs such as The Underground, where he heard Randy Schlager and Donald Glaude, and started experimenting with this music himself.

In 1991, he moved to Los Angeles. After playing a few events with LA-based DJ Ron D Core, with whom he released a series of mixtapes and live mixes, he made his way to San Francisco in 1993 where he joined Funky Tekno Tribe. In 1996, he partnered with Jim Hopkins, releasing Loose Caboose under the name Electroliners. This track was picked up by DJs such as Carl Cox, Sasha, John Digweed, and Lee Burridge. Pete Tong played Wherrett's first Essential Mix in 1998, with a follow-up in 1999, and again in 2007 with Frankie Knuckles at the Winter Music Conference.

In 2000, Carl Cox invited Wherrett on his tour. In the same year, Wherrett's track "That Zipper Track" was released on four labels worldwide, and went on to sell over 100,000 copies on vinyl. In 2001, he created his own label, InStereo Recordings.

DJ Mag named DJ Dan the No. 1 House DJ in 2006. URB magazine named him "America's Favorite DJ" and "America's Hardest Working DJ". In 2014, he was rated the No. 9 DJ in the US according to the DJ Times' "America's Best DJ" Poll.

On March 28, 2026, Wherrett died of a heart attack at the age of 57; he had not made a scheduled appearance at the Spring Ball at Dead Ringer Analog Bar in Reno, Nevada on March 28.

== Discography ==
=== Singles ===
- DJ Dan & Hatiras – Baked From Scratch (Blow Media)
- DJ Dan – Bam (InStereo)
- DJ Dan and Grandadbob – Disco Hertz EP (Faith and Hope Recordings)
- DJ Dan – Transformers Cartoon Theme (Hasbro)
- DJ Dan – Get Up (Kinetic)
- DJ Dan & Bryan Cox – It's Getting Closer (Ammo)
- DJ Dan & Hatiras – Love for the Weekend (Blow Media)
- DJ Dan Presents Needle Damage – That Zipper Track (Moonshine) – UK No. 53
- DJ Dan – Needle Damage Remixes (Audacious)
- DJ Dan – Put That Record Back On (Kinetic)
- DJ Dan – Put That Record Back On (Part 1) (Honchos)
- DJ Dan – Put That Record Back On (Part 2) (Honchos)
- DJ Dan – Rock to the Rhythm (Audacious)
- DJ Dan – That Phone Track (Subliminal)
- DJ Dan & Dano – That Arrival (Red Melon Records)
- DJ Dan Presents Future Retro – Evolution 1 (Nettwerk)
- DJ Dan Presents Future Retro – Evolution 2 (Nettwerk)
- DJ Dan Presents Future Retro – Evolution 3 (Nettwerk)
- DJ Dan Presents Future Retro – Fascinated (Nettwerk)
- DJ Dan – In Your Area (Nettwerk)
- DJ Dan – Work That Sucka/Whores Play (Rising)
- DJ Dan – Stereo Damage (Hotfingers)
- DJ Dan – Nasty Night Out EP (Guesthouse)
- DJ Dan & Bartouze – Jukebox (InStereo Recordings)
- DJ Dan – House All Night (PornoStar Records)
- DJ Dan – Baby Boomer (Guesthouse)
- DJ Dan & DJ Mes – Don't Hold Back (Guesthouse)
- DJ Dan – Just A Fool (Dub Mix) (Guesthouse)
- DJ Dan – Reckless Gurl (Guesthouse)
- DJ Dan – In Your Area 2012 Edit (Nettwerk)
- DJ Dan & Brian Matrix – More Damage (Heartfelt Sounds)
- DJ Dan – Fist Pump Broken (Guesthouse)
- DJ Dan – Disco Dancing (Guesthouse)
- DJ Dan & DJ Mes – Where You Come From (Guesthouse)
- DJ Dan & Brian Matrix – Africa (Hotfingers)
- DJ Dan – Out of Nowhere (Guesthouse)
- DJ Dan – American Girls American Girls (Guesthouse)
- DJ Dan – Ghost (Guesthouse)
- DJ Dan – The Edge (Guesthouse)
- DJ Dan – The Real Deal (Guesthouse)
- DJ Dan – Love Is Stronger (Guesthouse)
- DJ Dan – Party People (Guesthouse)
- DJ Dan – Chunka Funk (Guesthouse)
- DJ Dan & DJ Mes – Mighty High (Guesthouse)
- DJ Dan & DJ Mes – I Got It (Guesthouse)
- DJ Dan – French Dish (Guesthouse)
- DJ Dan & DJ Mes – Don't Hold Back (Guesthouse)
- DJ Dan & Umek – Mighty Wind (Toolroom)
- DJ Dan & Phunk Investigation – Can You Hear It (Phunk Traxx)
- DJ Dan & Oscar L – Feel The Panic (Toolroom)
- DJ Dan & DJ Mes – Mighty High (Guesthouse)
- DJ Dan & DJ Mes – Where You Come From (Guesthouse)
- DJ Dan & Groovebox – Half Steppin' (Work Records)
- DJ Dan & Simon Doty – Disco Slice (Toolroom)
- DJ Dan & Simon Doty – Smash The Disco (Toolroom)
- DJ Dan & Phunk Investigation – Everybody Over There (InStereo Recordings)
- DJ Dan – Don't Disturb This Groove (InStereo Recordings)

=== Studio albums ===
- Future Retro (Nettwerk, 2010)
- Disco Funk Odyssey (Guesthouse Music, 2013)
- Nothing But A Party (InStereo Recordings, 2014)

== See also ==
- List of Billboard number-one dance club songs
- List of artists who reached number one on the U.S. Dance Club Songs chart
