= Corinne Bailey Rae discography =

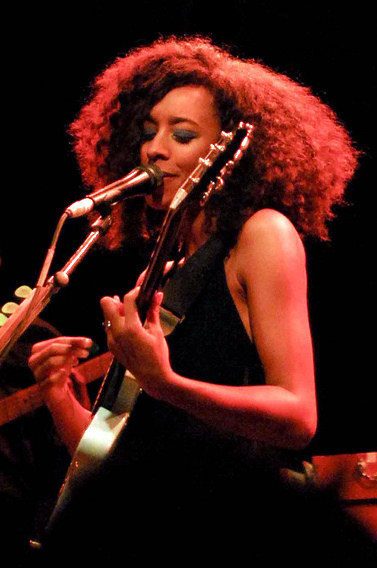
- Rae performing at Le Divan du Monde in Paris, January 2010
- Studio albums: 4
- Extended plays: 4
- Live albums: 1
- Singles: 13
- Music videos: 13
- Promotional singles: 1

English singer and songwriter Corinne Bailey Rae has released four studio albums, one live album, four extended plays, 13 singles (including five as a featured artist), one promotional single and 13 music videos.

Rae released her eponymous debut album in February 2006. It debuted atop the UK Albums Chart, while reaching the top five in Ireland and the United States, and the top 10 in Canada, New Zealand and Switzerland. Corinne Bailey Rae was certified triple platinum by the British Phonographic Industry (BPI) and platinum by the Recording Industry Association of America (RIAA), selling over four million copies worldwide. The album spawned four singles, including "Put Your Records On", which peaked at number two on the UK Singles Chart.

Rae's second studio album, The Sea, was released in January 2010, reaching number five on the UK Albums Chart, number seven on the US Billboard 200 and number 13 on the Canadian Albums Chart. It was later certified gold by the BPI. The album was promoted by three singles: "I'd Do It All Again", "Paris Nights/New York Mornings" and "Closer". In May 2016, Rae released her third studio album, The Heart Speaks in Whispers, which peaked at number 14 on the UK Albums Chart.

== Albums ==
=== Studio albums ===
List of studio albums, with selected chart positions, sales figures and certifications
Title	Details	Peak chart positions										Sales	Certifications
Title	Details	UK	AUS	CAN	FRA	GER	IRE	NL	NZ	SWI	US	Sales	Certifications
Corinne Bailey Rae	Released: 24 February 2006; Label: EMI; Formats: CD, LP, digital download	1	54	8	26	18	2	8	6	8	4	UK: 968,341; US: 1,900,000	BPI: 3× Platinum; BVMI: Gold; IFPI SWI: Gold; IRMA: 2× Platinum; MC: Platinum; RIAA: Platinum; RMNZ: Platinum; SNEP: Gold
The Sea	Released: 20 January 2010; Label: Virgin; Formats: CD, LP, digital download	5	—	13	78	70	33	36	—	27	7	UK: 104,331	BPI: Gold
The Heart Speaks in Whispers	Released: 13 May 2016; Label: Virgin EMI; Formats: CD, LP, digital download	14	—	—	—	—	100	74	—	—	31		
Black Rainbows	Released: 15 September 2023; Label: Black Rainbows, Thirty Tigers; Formats: CD, LP, digital download	— (Note: "Black Rainbows" did not enter the UK Albums Chart but debuted at number 32 on the UK Album Downloads Chart on 22 September 2023.)	—	—	—	—	—	—	—	—	— (Note: Black Rainbows did not enter the Billboard 200 but peaked at number 92 on the Top Album Sales chart.)		
"—" denotes a recording that did not chart or was not released in that territory.

=== Live albums ===
List of live albums, with selected chart positions
Title	Details	Peaks
Title	Details	POR
Live in London & New York	Released: 12 March 2007; Label: EMI; Formats: DVD/CD, digital download	28

== Extended plays ==
List of extended plays, with selected chart positions
Title	Details	Peaks	
Title	Details	US	US R&B
Live Session EP (iTunes Exclusive)	Released: 16 October 2006; Label: Virgin; Format: Digital download	—	—
Venus (Music from the Motion Picture)	Released: 16 January 2007; Label: Virgin; Format: Digital download	—	—
iTunes Live from SoHo	Released: 10 August 2010; Label: Capitol; Format: Digital download	—	50
The Love EP	Released: 25 January 2011; Label: Capitol; Formats: CD, digital download	86	20
"—" denotes a recording that did not chart or was not released in that territory.

== Singles ==
=== As lead artist ===
List of singles as lead artist, with selected chart positions and certifications, showing year released and album name
Title	Year	Peak chart positions										Certifications	Album
Title	Year	UK	AUS	FRA	GER	IRE	NL	NZ	SWI	US	US R&B/ HH	Certifications	Album
"Like a Star"	2005	32 (Note: "Like a Star" originally reached number 34 on the UK Singles Chart, but reached a new peak of number 32 when re-released in October 2006.)	—	—	—	—	100	—	—	56	59	BPI: Silver; RIAA: Platinum	Corinne Bailey Rae
"Put Your Records On"	2006	2	30	65	75	24	24	6	23	64	—	BPI: 3× Platinum; RIAA: 3× Platinum; RMNZ: 5× Platinum	Corinne Bailey Rae
"Trouble Sleeping"	2006	40	—	—	—	46	40	—	—	—	—		Corinne Bailey Rae
"I'd Like To"	2007	79	—	—	—	—	100	—	—	—	—		Corinne Bailey Rae
"I'd Do It All Again"	2010	—	—	—	—	—	—	—	—	—	—		The Sea
"Paris Nights/New York Mornings"	2010	—	—	—	—	—	—	—	—	—	—		The Sea
"Closer"	2010	—	—	—	—	—	—	—	—	—	31		The Sea
"Is This Love"	2010	—	—	—	—	—	—	—	—	—	— (Note: "Is This Love" did not enter the Hot R&B/Hip-Hop Songs chart, but peaked at number four on the Bubbling Under R&B/Hip-Hop Singles chart.)		The Love EP
"Been to the Moon"	2016	—	—	—	—	—	—	—	—	—	—		The Heart Speaks in Whispers
"Green Aphrodisiac"	2016	—	—	—	—	—	—	—	—	—	— (Note: "Green Aphrodisiac" did not enter the Hot R&B/Hip-Hop Songs chart, but peaked at number 13 on the Adult R&B Songs chart.)		The Heart Speaks in Whispers
"Stop Where You Are"	2016	—	—	—	—	—	—	—	—	—	—		The Heart Speaks in Whispers
"The Skies Will Break"	2016	—	—	—	—	—	—	—	—	—	—		The Heart Speaks in Whispers
"Hey, I Won't Break Your Heart"	2016	—	—	—	—	—	—	—	—	—	—		The Heart Speaks in Whispers
"Do You Ever Think of Me?"	2019	—	—	—	—	—	—	—	—	—	—		The Heart Speaks in Whispers
"New York Transit Queen"	2023	—	—	—	—	—	—	—	—	—	—		Black Rainbows
"Peach Velvet Sky"	2023	—	—	—	—	—	—	—	—	—	—		Black Rainbows
"—" denotes a recording that did not chart or was not released in that territory.

=== As featured artist ===
List of singles as featured artist, with selected chart positions, showing year released and album name
Title	Year	Peaks		Album
Title	Year	UK	US Dance	Album
"Come the Revolution" (Homecut Directive featuring Corinne Bailey Rae)	2003	—	—	Two Syllables
"Your Love Is Mine" (The New Mastersounds featuring Corinne Bailey Rae)	2003	—	4	Be Yourself
"Young & Foolish" (The stiX featuring Corinne Bailey Rae)	2005	88	—	Better Luck Next Time
"If I Don't" (Amp Fiddler featuring Corinne Bailey Rae)	2007	—	—	Afro Strut
"I Don't Even Know" (Homecut featuring Corinne Bailey Rae and Soweto Kinch)	2009	—	—	No Freedom Without Sacrifice
"Sister" (Tracey Thorn featuring Corinne Bailey Rae)	2018	—	—	Record
"You Are" (Smoko Ono featuring Corinne Bailey Rae and Umi)	2021	—	—	Non-album single
"—" denotes a recording that did not chart or was not released in that territory.

=== Promotional singles ===
List of promotional singles, with selected chart positions
Title	Year	Peaks	Album
Title	Year	US R&B/ HH	Album
"Breathless"	2007	70	Corinne Bailey Rae

== Other charted songs ==
List of other charted songs, with selected chart positions
Title	Year	Peak chart positions								Sales	Album
Title	Year	UK	FRA	KOR Int.	NZ Heat.	SWI	US AAA	US R&B /HH	US Smooth Jazz	Sales	Album
"River" (Herbie Hancock featuring Corinne Bailey Rae)	2007	—	—	—	—	—	—	—	28		River: The Joni Letters
"Free" (Marcus Miller featuring Corinne Bailey Rae)	2008	—	—	—	—	—	—	— (Note: "Free" did not enter the US Hot R&B/Hip-Hop Songs chart but did peak at number 19 on the Adult R&B Songs chart.)	9		Free
"The Blackest Lily"	2010	—	—	—	—	—	26	—	—		The Sea
"My Love"	2011	—	—	9	—	—	—	—	—	KOR: 245,760	The Love EP
"The Scientist"	2017	86	21	—	10	61	—	— (Note: "The Scientist" did not enter the US Hot R&B/Hip-Hop Songs chart, but did peak at number 15 on the R&B/Hip-Hop Digital Song Sales chart.)	—		Fifty Shades Darker: Original Motion Picture Soundtrack
"—" denotes a recording that did not chart or was not released in that territory.

== Guest appearances ==
List of non-single guest appearances, with other performing artists, showing year released and album name
Title	Year	Other artist(s)	Album
"I'm Losing You"	2007	None	Instant Karma: The Amnesty International Campaign to Save Darfur
"Free"	2007	Marcus Miller	Free
"One Night (of Sin)"	2007	None	Goin' Home: A Tribute to Fats Domino
"River"	2007	Herbie Hancock	River: The Joni Letters
"Steady, As She Goes"	2007	None	Radio 1 Established 1967
"SexyBack"	2007	None	Radio 1's Live Lounge – Volume 2
"Mercy Mercy Me (The Ecology)"	2007	John Legend	Live Earth (2007 concert)
"Take Your Time"	2008	Al Green	Lay It Down
"Where Is the Love"	2008	John Legend	Live from Philadelphia
"This Christmas"	2010	None	Sleigh Ride: Side by Side
"Closer (Live)"	2010	None	Live from the Artists Den: Season 2 - Various Artists
"Chains"	2012	None	The Man with the Iron Fists
"Jealous Guy"	2013	None	Virgin Records: 40 Years of Disruptions
"Makin' It Hard for Me"	2013	Salaam Remi	ONE: In The Chamber
"Bluebird"	2014	None	The Art of McCartney
"Sign Your Name"	2016	None	BBC Radio 2's Sounds Of The 80s Vol 2
"The Scientist"	2017	None	Fifty Shades Darker: Original Motion Picture Soundtrack
"Boredom"	2017	Tyler, the Creator, Rex Orange County, Anna of the North	Flower Boy
"Versions of Us"	2017	Kele Okereke	Fatherland (album)
"In Due Time"	2018	Raury, Jaixx	The Woods
"Natural"	2018	Raury	The Woods
"Sister"	2018	Tracey Thorn	Record (Tracey Thorn album)
"I Still Want You"	2018	Richard Hawley	Funny Cow
"Consensual Seduction"	2018	Mick Jenkins (rapper)	Pieces of a Man (Mick Jenkins album)

== Music videos ==
List of music videos, showing year released and directors
Title	Year	Director
"Like a Star"	2006	James Griffiths
"Put Your Records On"	2006	Sam Brown
"Trouble Sleeping"	2006	Andy Hylton
"Like a Star" (second version)	2006	Sam Brown
"I'd Like To"	2007	Unknown
"I'd Do It All Again"	2009	Jamie Thraves
"Paris Nights/New York Mornings"	2010	Charles Mehling
"Closer"	2010	Adria Petty
"Been to the Moon"	2016	Chris Turner
"Stop Where You Are"	2016	Chris Turner
"Green Aphrodisiac"	2016	Eva Vazquez
"The Skies Will Break"	2016	Chloe Hayward
"Hey, I Won't Break Your Heart"	2016	James Frost
