= Live in London & New York =

Live album by Corinne Bailey Rae
- Released: 12 March 2007
- Recorded: 2 April 2006
- Venues: St Luke's (London); Webster Hall (New York City)
- Length: 59:41 (CD)
- Label: EMI
- Director: Janet Fraser Crook
- Producer: Alison Howe

Corinne Bailey Rae chronology
Corinne Bailey Rae (2006)	Live in London & New York (2007)	The Sea (2010)

Professional ratings
Review scores
Source	Rating
AllMusic	3/5 stars

Live in London & New York is a live album by English singer-songwriter Corinne Bailey Rae. It was released on 12 March 2007 by EMI. The DVD features Bailey Rae's concert at St Luke's in London, which was filmed for the BBC, while the CD was recorded at Webster Hall in New York City.

== Track listing ==
DVD – Live in London
No.	Title	Length
1.	"Call Me When You Get This"
2.	"Trouble Sleeping"
3.	"Breathless"
4.	"Enchantment"
5.	"Till It Happens to You"
6.	"Since I've Been Loving You"
7.	"Like a Star"
8.	"Put Your Records On"
9.	"Butterfly"
10.	"I'd Like To"
11.	"Choux Pastry Heart"
12.	"Seasons Change"

Bonus features
No.	Title	Length
1.	"Documentary"
2.	"Put Your Records On" (music video)
3.	"Trouble Sleeping" (music video)
4.	"Like a Star" (music video)
5.	"I'd Like To" (music video)

CD – Live in New York
No.	Title	Writer(s)	Length
1.	"Call Me When You Get This"	Corinne Bailey Rae; Steve Bush	5:53
2.	"Trouble Sleeping"	Bailey Rae; John Beck; Steve Chrisanthou	3:49
3.	"Breathless"	Bailey Rae; Marc Nelkin	5:14
4.	"Enchantment"	Bailey Rae; Rod Bowkett	4:29
5.	"Till It Happens to You"	Bailey Rae; Pamela Sheyne; Paul Herman	4:53
6.	"Since I've Been Loving You"	Jimmy Page; Robert Plant; John Paul Jones	5:48
7.	"Like a Star"	Bailey Rae	5:26
8.	"Put Your Records On"	Bailey Rae; Beck; Chrisanthou	3:53
9.	"Butterfly"	Bailey Rae; Bowkett	4:02
10.	"I'd Like To"	Bailey Rae; Tommy Danvers; Herman	5:28
11.	"Choux Pastry Heart"	Bailey Rae; Teitur Lassen	4:56
12.	"Seasons Change"	Bailey Rae; Steve Brown	5:50
Total length:			59:41

== Personnel ==
Credits adapted from the liner notes of Live in London & New York.

=== Performers and musicians ===
London and New York

- Corinne Bailey Rae – vocals, guitar
- Sam Blue Agard – drums
- Vicky Akintona – backing vocals
- Oroh Angiama – bass, double bass
- Alexander Bennett – keyboards
- LaDonna Harley-Peters – backing vocals
- Jan Ozveren – guitar

London only

- Jim Corry – tenor saxophone
- Caroline Dale – strings
- Joely Koos – strings
- Bea Lovehoy – strings
- Wil Malone – string arrangements
- Perry Manson – strings
- Cate Musker – strings
- Everton Nelson – strings
- Chris Pistiledes – strings
- Jason Rae – alto saxophone, flute
- Jacky Shave – strings
- Tom Piggot Smith – strings
- Malcolm Strachan – trumpet
- Gavyn Wright – London Session Orchestra direction, strings

=== Production and technical ===
- Abbey Road Interactive – creating, documentary editing, DVD interface design
- Carol Abbott – vision mixing
- Gerard Albo – front of house engineering, stereo mix
- Perry Bellisario – VT editing
- Jude Bennett – production for EMI
- Victoria Biram – script supervision
- Lucy Bullivant – production team assistance
- Rebecca Coates – production for EMI
- Mark Cooper – executive production
- Stefan Demetriou – production for EMI
- Matt Dixon – production for EMI
- Janet Fraser Crook – direction
- Mike Felton – light supervision
- Alison Howe – production
- John Henry's Ltd. – floor monitoring
- Laura Kennedy – production runner
- Sue Longstaff – production management
- Sharon Lord – executive production (Webster Hall recording)
- Ted Mico – executive production (Webster Hall recording)
- Stephania Minia – production executive
- Matty Myhaf – backline tech
- Doe Phillips – tour/production management
- Sam Ribeck – floor management
- Paul Richardson – design
- Chris Rigby – lighting direction
- Irene Rukerebuka – illustrations
- Matthew Rumbold – production for EMI
- Stylorouge – additional illustrations, art direction, design
- Dave Swallow – backline tech
- Gerry Tivers – camera supervision
- Jeremy Turner – engineering management
- Duncan Wild – monitor engineering

=== Additional film crew ===
- Mark Bond – camera
- Mike Felton – light supervision, mixing, recording
- John Hudson – surround sound mix
- Joe Walters – camera

=== Bailey Rae's own crew ===
- Gerard Albo – sound engineering
- Lynette Garland – styling
- Emma Libotte – hair, make-up
- Doe Phillips – production/tour management
- Scottie Sanderson – advance production
- Richard Simpson – styling
- Vern Stannard – backline technician
- Duncan Wild – monitor technician

== Charts ==
Chart (2007)	Peak position
Portuguese Albums (AFP)	28
UK Music Videos (Official Charts)	25

== Release history ==
Region	Date	Format	Label	Ref.
France	12 March 2007	DVD + CD	EMI	
United Kingdom	12 March 2007	DVD + CD	EMI	
Germany	15 March 2007	DVD + CD	EMI	
Canada	3 April 2007	DVD + CD	EMI	
United States	3 April 2007	DVD + CD	Capitol	
