= Ritt Momney =

American singer-songwriter (born 1999)

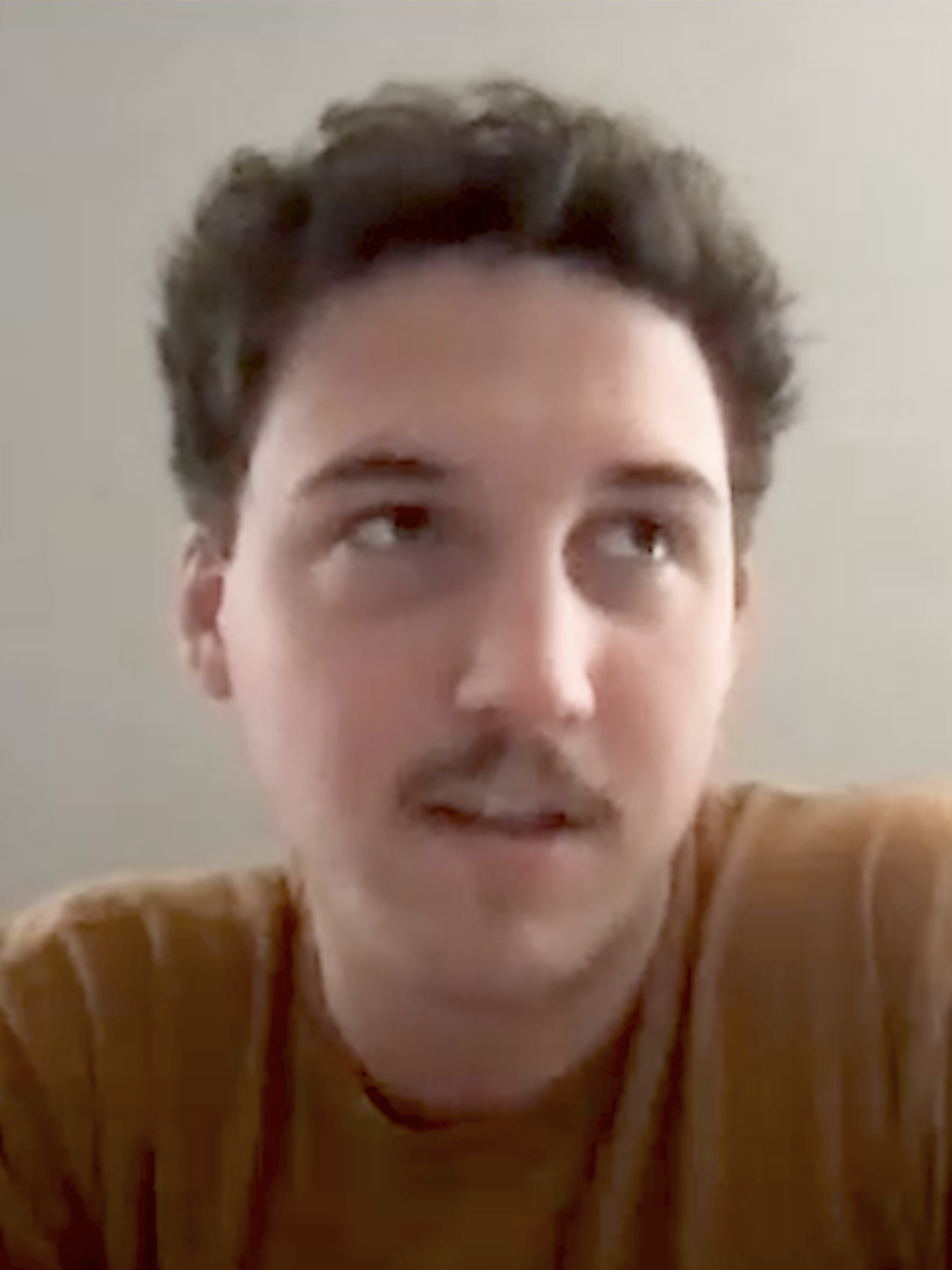
- Rutter in 2021

Background information
- Born: Jack William Rutter; October 12, 1999 (age 26); Dallas, Texas, U.S.
- Origin: Salt Lake City, Utah, U.S.
- Genres: Indie pop
- Occupation: Singer-songwriter
- Years active: 2016–present

Jack William Rutter (born October 12, 1999), better known as Ritt Momney, is an American singer-songwriter from Salt Lake City, Utah. His stage name is a spoonerism of American politician Mitt Romney, who was the Republican nominee during the 2012 United States presidential election and a United States Senator who represented Rutter's home state of Utah from 2019 to 2025. Ritt Momney rose to fame following his 2020 cover of Corinne Bailey Rae's "Put Your Records On".

== Early life ==
Rutter was born on October 12, 1999, in Dallas, Texas. When he was about two years old, his family moved to Salt Lake City, where he currently resides. He grew up in a heavily LDS community, which influenced his early musical career. Rutter graduated from East High School in Salt Lake City.

== Career ==
Ritt Momney was previously the name of an indie band formed by Rutter in high-school, but he became a solo artist after his bandmates departed to become LDS missionaries.

Rutter recorded a cover version of the song "Put Your Records On" by Corinne Bailey Rae, which was released on April 24, 2020, originally independently through DistroKid and later re-released through Disruptor Records and Columbia Records. The song became a sleeper hit after gaining popularity on the video sharing service TikTok in September 2020. Domestically, it peaked at number 30 on the Billboard Hot 100. The song also charted in the top 40 of 15 countries, and peaked in the top 10 in Australia and New Zealand.

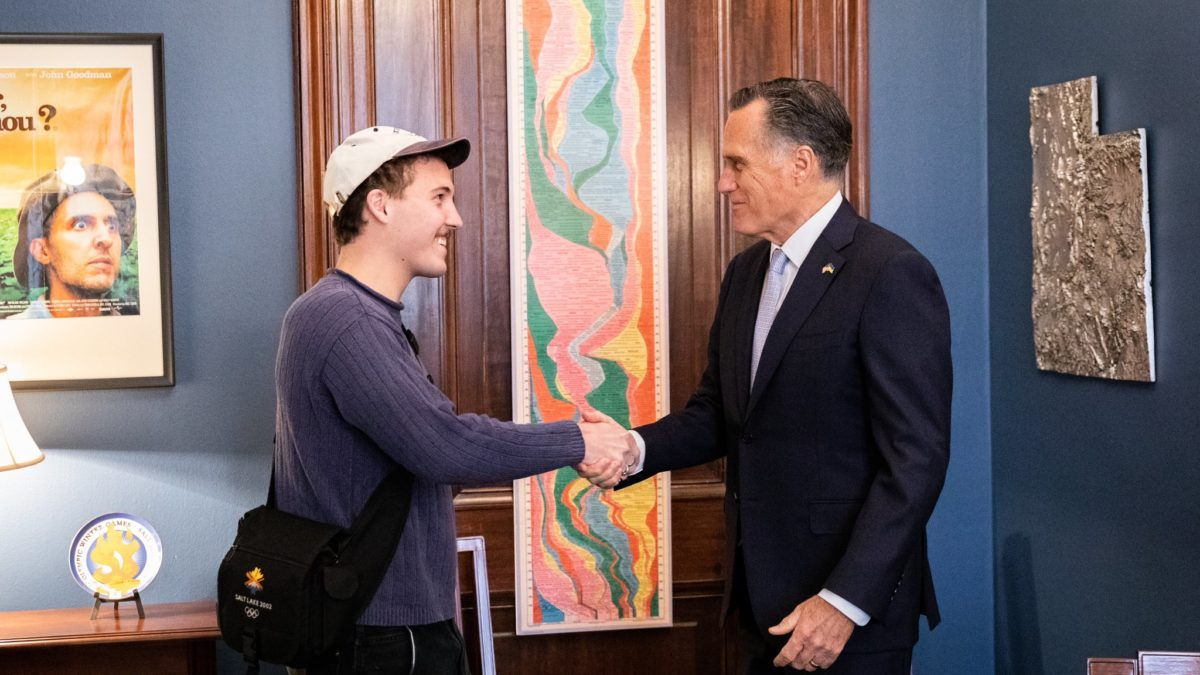
Rutter with Senator Romney in 2022

When asked about Ritt, U.S. Senator Mitt Romney said, "They say that imitation is the sincerest form of flattery. In all seriousness, I wish Ritt Momney the best of luck in his music career and all his future endeavors." Later on March 23, 2022, Rutter and his bandmates, who were in Washington, D.C. for a concert, met the U.S. Senator on Capitol Hill. In contrast to Romney, Rutter considers himself to be on the political left.

== Discography ==
=== Albums ===
Title	Details
Her and All of My Friends	Released: July 19, 2019; Formats: digital download, streaming, vinyl
Sunny Boy	Released: October 22, 2021; Label: Columbia; Formats: digital download, streaming, vinyl
BASE	Released: February 27, 2026; Formats: digital download, streaming, vinyl
"—" denotes items which were not released in that country or failed to chart.

=== Singles ===
==== As lead artist ====
List of singles as lead artist, showing year released, selected chart positions, certifications, and originating album
Title	Year	Peak chart positions										Certifications	Album
Title	Year	US	AUS	CAN	GER	IRE	NLD	NZ	SWE	UK	WW	Certifications	Album
"Young Adult"	2017	—	—	—	—	—	—	—	—	—	—		Non-album singles
"Theater Kid / Probably"	2017	—	—	—	—	—	—	—	—	—	—		Non-album singles
"Something, in General"	2018	—	—	—	—	—	—	—	—	—	—		Her and All of My Friends
"Paper News"	2018	—	—	—	—	—	—	—	—	—	—		Her and All of My Friends
"Pollution / Disclaimer"	2018	—	—	—	—	—	—	—	—	—	—		Her and All of My Friends
"Phoebe"	2019	—	—	—	—	—	—	—	—	—	—		Her and All of My Friends
"On Love (An Alternative Response to Almitra's Request)"	2019	—	—	—	—	—	—	—	—	—	—		Her and All of My Friends
"(If) the Book Doesn't Sell"	2019	—	—	—	—	—	—	—	—	—	—		Her and All of My Friends
"Put Your Records On"	2020	30	10	39	52	18	31	8	23	25	55	RIAA: Platinum; ARIA: Platinum; BPI: Gold; MC: 2× Platinum; RMNZ: 2× Platinum	Non-album single
"Not Around"	2021	—	—	—	—	—	—	—	—	—	—		Sunny Boy
"Set the Table" (featuring Claud)	2021	—	—	—	—	—	—	—	—	—	—		Sunny Boy
"Escalator"	2021	—	—	—	—	—	—	—	—	—	—		Sunny Boy
"Show Runner 99"	2021	—	—	—	—	—	—	—	—	—	—		Sunny Boy
"Sometime" (with Shane T)	2021	—	—	—	—	—	—	—	—	—	—		Sunny Boy
"—" denotes items which were not released in that country or failed to chart.
