= Marvin Tate =

American singer-songwriter

- Born: Chicago, Illinois, U.S.
- Origin: Chicago, Illinois
- Genres: Funk music; jazz; soul; spoken word
- Occupations: Artist; poet; singer-songwriter
- Instrument: Vocals
- Years active: 1980s-present

Marvin Tate (born 1959) is an American artist, poet, and singer-songwriter from Chicago.

== Early life ==
Tate was born in the North Lawndale neighborhood of Chicago in 1959. Tate attended the University of Illinois at Chicago, studying with Sterling Plumpp. In 1983 Tate moved to New York City, moving back to Chicago in 1985.

== Career ==
Tate lives and works in Chicago, IL. Tate is the author of Schoolyard of Broken Dreams (Tia Chucha Press, 1994) and The Amazing Mister Orange (Curbside Splendor, 2014). His honors include grants from the Poetry Foundation and the Illinois Arts Council.

In the mid-1980s, Tate started performing at open mics and slam poetry competitions around the city, and was a regular participant in the Uptown Poetry Slam.

In 1990, Tate became Chicago's poetry slam champion, after which he was featured on the MacNeil/Lehrer NewsHour. In the early 1990s Tate was a member of Uptighty, with Leroy Bach (Wilco) and Dan Bitney (Tortoise), and hosted a local talk show called Talk-A-Riot-Y. Tate won a poetry slam hosted as part of Lollapalooza 1994. In 1997, Tate appeared with David Sedaris on This American Life.

Tate fronted the experimental poetry/funk band D-Settlement from the 1990s to early 2000s, which released three albums from 1997 to 2002 as Marvin Tate's D-Settlement. The Chicago Tribune wrote: "By merging ferociously honest poetry with various black musical traditions, Tate stands as heir to Chicagoan Oscar Brown Jr., the veteran urban griot whose lyrics long have decried racism and social injustice."

In 2004, Tate appeared on the compilation reVerse with Lawrence Ferlinghetti, Alexi Murdoch, Lou Reed and Mark Strand. In 2005, Tate performed the poem "My Life to the Present" on Def Jam Poetry. In 2014, Joyful Noise released the album Tim Kinsella Sings the Songs of Marvin Tate by LeRoy Bach Featuring Angel Olsen, an album interpreting Tate's songs. In 2017, the Jazz Institute of Chicago invited Tate to perform Langston Hughes' poem "Ask Your Mama: 12 Moods for Jazz." Tate adapted it into "A Great Day in the Neighborhood — Echoes of Langston Hughes," incorporating film, dance, and jazz instrumentals from Greg Ward and Ben LaMar Gay. In 2024, Tate appeared on Corinne Bailey Rae's album Black Rainbows.

Tate is represented by Hana Pietri Gallery in Chicago, IL. In 2019, Intuit: The Center for Outsider Art presented an exhibition of Tate's artwork, Looking at You From a Distance Not Too Far: Work by Marvin Tate.

== Poetry ==
Tate's influences include Amiri Baraka, Gwendolyn Brooks, Charles Bukowski, Ivor Cutler, Stephen Dobyns, doo-wop, gospel, and the blues. The Chicago Tribune notes of Tate's writing: "Though it's often funny or absurd, the work's most striking aspect is the calm sense of melancholy consistent in every piece..."

== Discography ==
=== As leader and co-leader ===
- Partly Cloudy (as Marvin Tate's D-Settlement) (1997, Urban Collision)
- The Minstrel Show (as Marvin Tate's D-Settlement) (1999, Urban Collision)
- American Icons (as Marvin Tate's D-Settlement) (2002, Urban Collision)
- Family Swim (2007, IVR)
- Tim Kinsella Sings the Songs of Marvin Tate by LeRoy Bach Featuring Angel Olsen (2014, Joyful Noise)
- The Process with Joseph Clayton Mills (2016, Every Contact Leaves a Trace)
- Kitchen Songs (2018, self-released)
- "Jesus on'da Green Line" with Ben LaMar Gay (2020, self-released)
- Marvin Tate's D-Settlement (2022, American Dreams Records)

=== Guest appearances ===
- Uptighty by Uptighty (1993, Mud)
- Flesh & Bone by Mike Reed (2017, 482 Music)
- Fly or Die II: Bird Dogs of Paradise by Jaimie Branch (2019, International Anthem)
- Immensity of the Territory Vol. 3 by Charles-Henry Beneteau, Christophe Havard, Anthony Taillard (2020, Entropic GBC)
- Black Rainbows by Corinne Bailey Rae (2024, Black Rainbows / Thirty Tigers)

=== Compilation inclusions ===
- "San Francisco Sky," "Schoolyard of Broken Dreams" on A Snake In The Heart: Poems and Music by Chicago Spoken Word Performers (1994, Tia Chucha Press)
- "Take Off Your Shoes (And Run)" on reVerse (2005, reVerse)
- "Blood in the Potatoe Salad," "Take Off Your Shoes (and Run)" on Urban Collision Presents (2005, Urban Collision)

== Publications ==
- Schoolyard of Broken Dreams (Tia Chucha Press, 1994)
- "Soulville Revisited," "The Ebony Mannequin in the Marshall Fields State Street Store Window" published in Black Writing from Chicago: In the World, Not of It?, ed. Richard R. Guzman (Southern Illinois University Press, 2005)
- The Amazing Mister Orange (Curbside Splendor, 2014)
