= Corinne Bailey Rae (album) =

2006 studio album by Corinne Bailey Rae

- Standard European cover

Studio album by Corinne Bailey Rae
- Released: 24 February 2006
- Recorded: 2004–2005
- Studios: The Idle (Note: Tracks 1–3, 5, 8 and 10); Olympic (London) (Note: Strings on tracks 2, 6 and 10); Taxlight (Note: Additional recording on track 11); John Ellis's place
- Genres: Pop-soul; neo soul; R&B
- Length: 41:35
- Label: EMI
- Producers: Steve Chrisanthou; Justin Broad; Steve Brown; Steve Bus; Tommy D; Andrew Hale; Paul Herman; RKW

Corinne Bailey Rae chronology
Corinne Bailey Rae (2006)	Live in London & New York (2007)

Alternative cover
- North American and Asia cover

Singles from Corinne Bailey Rae
- 1. "Like a Star" Released: 7 November 2005; 2. "Put Your Records On" Released: 20 February 2006; 3. "Trouble Sleeping" Released: 29 May 2006; 4. "I'd Like To" Released: 12 February 2007

Corinne Bailey Rae is the debut studio album by English singer-songwriter Corinne Bailey Rae, released on 24 February 2006 by EMI. The album debuted at number one on the UK Albums Chart and has been certified triple platinum by the British Phonographic Industry (BPI). Four singles were released from the album: "Like a Star", "Put Your Records On", "Trouble Sleeping" and "I'd Like To". Corinne Bailey Rae has sold over four million copies worldwide.

== Release and promotion ==
"Like a Star" was released as the album's lead single in a limited-edition format in 2005, peaking at number 34 on the UK Singles Chart. When re-released in October 2006, "Like a Star" reached a new peak position of number 32 on the UK chart. The second single, "Put Your Records On", peaked at number two in February 2006. "Trouble Sleeping" was released as the album's third single in May 2006, peaking at number 40 in the UK.

"I'd Like To" was released on 12 February 2007 as the fourth and final single. On the same day, the album was re-released with a bonus disc containing some of the B-sides and remixes included on previous singles, as well as three new tracks—one of which, a cover of Björk's 1993 song "Venus as a Boy", only previously appeared on a covermount for Q magazine. Several songs from the album appear in the 2006 comedy-drama film Venus starring Peter O'Toole. In the United States, "Breathless" was released as a promotional single in 2007.

== Critical reception ==
Professional ratings
Aggregate scores
Source	Rating
Metacritic	69/100
Review scores
Source	Rating
AllMusic	3.5/5 stars
Blender	3.5/5 stars
Entertainment Weekly	B
Los Angeles Times	3/4 stars
NME	6/10
Pitchfork	8.0/10
PopMatters	5/10
Q	4/5 stars
Rolling Stone	3/5 stars
Spin	3/5 stars

Corinne Bailey Rae received generally positive reviews from music critics. At Metacritic, which assigns a normalised rating out of 100 to reviews from mainstream publications, the album received an average score of 69, based on 13 reviews. While some critics perceived filler as a weakness of the album, Bailey Rae earned positive comparisons to female recording artists such as Billie Holiday, Norah Jones, Erykah Badu, Minnie Riperton, and Macy Gray. David Jeffries of AllMusic called it "pleasingly homegrown, warm, and poignant in parts". Los Angeles Times writer Natalie Nichols compared Bailey Rae's music to that of Sade and Stevie Wonder. Michael Endelman of Entertainment Weekly called it "extremely agreeable, a bit predictable, and occasionally irresistible". MusicOMH writer Michael Hubbard called the debut "exceptional in every way" and "a breath of fresh air" Preston Jones of Slant Magazine was more lukewarm, saying "Rae’s amiable competence marks her as a talent worth keeping tabs on, but the strength of Corinne Bailey Rae is fleeting, a triumph of mood over tangible substance."

In contrast, Neil Spencer of The Observer gave the album a scathing review, saying "Beyond her calling card single, 'Like a Star', however, she shows a lack of ambition. The arrangements are generic (Al Green's leftovers, mostly), the cooing backing singers bland, and the lyrics pedestrian."

Paste listed the album as the 41st best of 2006.

=== Accolades ===
Bailey Rae received a nomination for Best UK & Ireland Act at the 2006 MTV Europe Music Awards. That same year, she won two MOBO Awards for Best UK Newcomer and Best UK Female, as well as a Mojo Award for Best New Act. Bailey Rae won Outstanding New Artist at the 2007 NAACP Image Awards, and was nominated for Outstanding Female Artist and Outstanding Album. At the 2007 Grammy Awards, Bailey Rae received a nomination for Best New Artist, while "Put Your Records On" was nominated for Record of the Year and Song of the Year. The following year, Bailey Rae was nominated for another Grammy Award for Song of the Year for "Like a Star", and "Put Your Records On" won an ASCAP Award for Song of the Year.

== Commercial performance ==
Corinne Bailey Rae debuted at number one on the UK Albums Chart, selling 108,181 copies in its first week. The album had sold 968,341 copies in the United Kingdom by May 2016, earning a triple platinum certification from the British Phonographic Industry (BPI) on 22 July 2013.

The album debuted at number 17 on the Billboard 200 in the United States, selling 40,000 copies in its first week. On the issue dated 3 March 2007, it peaked at number four with 120,000 copies sold. The album was certified platinum by the Recording Industry Association of America (RIAA) on 5 December 2006, and had sold 1.9 million copies in the US by January 2010. As of October 2009, Corinne Bailey Rae had sold over four million copies worldwide.

== Track listing ==
No.	Title	Writer(s)	Producer(s)	Length
1.	"Like a Star"	Corinne Bailey Rae	Steve Chrisanthou	4:01
2.	"Enchantment"	Bailey Rae; Rod Bowkett	Chrisanthou; Bowkett^{[a]}	3:56
3.	"Put Your Records On"	Bailey Rae; John Beck; Chrisanthou	Chrisanthou; Jimmy Hogarth^{[a]}	3:34
4.	"Till It Happens to You"	Bailey Rae; Pamela Sheyne; Paul Herman	Herman; Justin Broad	4:36
5.	"Trouble Sleeping"	Bailey Rae; Beck; Chrisanthou	Chrisanthou	3:27
6.	"Call Me When You Get This"	Bailey Rae; Steve Bush	Bush; Chrisanthou^{[a]}	5:02
7.	"Choux Pastry Heart"	Bailey Rae; Teitur Lassen	Andrew Hale	3:56
8.	"Breathless"	Bailey Rae; Marc Nelkin	Chrisanthou	4:13
9.	"I'd Like To"	Bailey Rae; Tommy Danvers; Herman	Tommy D; Herman	4:05
10.	"Butterfly"	Bailey Rae; Bowkett	Chrisanthou	3:52
11.	"Seasons Change"	Bailey Rae; Steve Brown	RKW; Brown; Chrisanthou^{[a]}	4:53
Total length:				41:35

iTunes Store, UK vinyl and Japanese edition bonus track
No.	Title	Writer(s)	Producer(s)	Length
12.	"Another Rainy Day"	Bailey Rae	Bailey Rae	3:15
Total length:				44:50

Japanese limited edition bonus tracks
No.	Title	Writer(s)	Producer(s)	Length
13.	"Emeraldine"	Bailey Rae; Hale	Hale	4:31
14.	"Put Your Records On" (acoustic)	Bailey Rae; Beck; Chrisanthou		3:50
15.	"Like a Star" (acoustic)	Bailey Rae		4:23
Total length:				57:54

UK special edition bonus disc, digital deluxe edition
No.	Title	Writer(s)	Producer(s)	Length
1.	"Since I've Been Loving You"	Jimmy Page; Robert Plant; John Paul Jones	Bailey Rae	4:22
2.	"Emeraldine"	Bailey Rae; Hale	Hale	4:31
3.	"No Love Child"	Cara Robinson; Wayne Pollock	Neil Innes; Pollock^{[a]}; Robinson^{[a]}	4:00
4.	"Enchantment" (Amp Fiddler Remix)	Bailey Rae; Bowkett	Chrisanthou; Bowkett^{[a]}; Fiddler^{[b]}	3:25
5.	"Venus as a Boy"	Björk Guðmundsdóttir	Chrisanthou	2:58
6.	"I'd Like To" (Weekender Mix)	Bailey Rae; Danvers; Herman	Tommy D^{[b]}^{[c]}; Herman; Bailey Rae^{[a]}^{[b]}	3:30
7.	"I Won't Let You Lie to Yourself"	Bailey Rae; Nelkin; Lassen	Chrisanthou; Rae^{[a]}	3:50
8.	"Another Rainy Day"	Bailey Rae	Bailey Rae	3:15
9.	"Daydreaming"	Aretha Franklin	Ariana Morgenstern	3:54
Total length:				33:45

European special edition bonus disc
No.	Title	Writer(s)	Producer(s)	Length
1.	"Since I've Been Loving You"	Page; Plant; Jones	Bailey Rae	4:22
2.	"Emeraldine"	Bailey Rae; Hale	Hale	4:31
3.	"Munich"	Thomas Michael Smith; Christopher Urbanowicz; Russell Leetch; Edward Owen Lay	George Thomas; Sara Carter	3:58
4.	"No Love Child"	Robinson; Pollock	Innes; Pollock^{[a]}; Robinson^{[a]}	4:00
5.	"Enchantment" (Amp Fiddler Remix)	Bailey Rae; Bowkett	Chrisanthou; Bowkett^{[a]}; Fiddler^{[b]}	3:25
6.	"Venus as a Boy"	Björk	Bailey Rae	2:58
7.	"I'd Like To" (Weekender Mix)	Bailey Rae; Danvers; Herman	Tommy D^{[b]}^{[c]}; Herman; Bailey Rae^{[a]}^{[b]}	3:30
8.	"I Won't Let You Lie to Yourself"	Bailey Rae; Nelkin; Lassen	Chrisanthou; Bailey Rae^{[a]}	3:50
9.	"Another Rainy Day"	Bailey Rae	Bailey Rae	3:15
10.	"Daydreaming"	Franklin	Morgenstern	3:54
Total length:				37:43

North American deluxe edition bonus disc
No.	Title	Writer(s)	Producer(s)	Length
1.	"Since I've Been Loving You"	Page; Plant; Jones	Bailey Rae	4:22
2.	"Emeraldine"	Bailey Rae; Hale	Hale	4:31
3.	"Munich"	Smith; Urbanowicz; Leetch; Lay	Thomas; Carter	3:58
4.	"Venus as a Boy"	Guðmundsdóttir	Bailey Rae	2:58
5.	"Another Rainy Day"	Bailey Rae	Bailey Rae	3:15
6.	"Daydreaming"	Franklin	Morgenstern	3:54
7.	"Enchantment" (Amp Fiddler Remix)	Bailey Rae; Bowkett	Chrisanthou; Bowkett^{[a]}; Fiddler^{[b]}	3:25
8.	"I'd Like To" (Weekender Mix)	Bailey Rae; Danvers; Herman	Tommy D^{[b]}^{[c]}; Herman; Bailey Rae^{[a]}^{[b]}	3:30
Total length:				29:53

US and UK digital bonus track versions
No.	Title	Writer(s)	Producer(s)	Length
1.	"Since I've Been Loving You"	Page; Plant; Jones	Bailey Rae	4:22
2.	"Emeraldine"	Bailey Rae; Hale	Hale	4:31
3.	"Venus as a Boy"	Björk	Bailey Rae	2:58
4.	"Another Rainy Day"	Bailey Rae	Bailey Rae	3:15
5.	"Daydreaming"	Franklin	Morgenstern	3:54
6.	"Enchantment" (Amp Fiddler Remix)	Bailey Rae; Bowkett	Chrisanthou; Bowkett^{[a]}; Fiddler^{[b]}	3:25
7.	"I'd Like To" (Weekender Mix)	Bailey Rae; Danvers; Herman	Tommy D^{[b]}^{[c]}; Herman; Bailey Rae^{[a]}^{[b]}	3:30
Total length:				29:53

15th Anniversary edition
No.	Title	Writer(s)	Producer(s)	Length
1.	"Like a Star"	Bailey Rae	Chrisanthou	4:01
2.	"Enchantment"	Bailey Rae; Bowkett	Chrisanthou; Bowkett^{[a]}	3:56
3.	"Put Your Records On"	Bailey Rae; Beck; Chrisanthou	Chrisanthou; Hogarth^{[a]}	3:34
4.	"Till It Happens to You"	Bailey Rae; Sheyne; Herman	Herman; Broad	4:36
5.	"Trouble Sleeping"	Bailey Rae; Beck; Chrisanthou	Chrisanthou	3:27
6.	"Another Rainy Day"	Bailey Rae	Bailey Rae	3:15
7.	"Call Me When You Get This"	Bailey Rae; Bush	Bush; Chrisanthou^{[a]}	5:02
8.	"Choux Pastry Heart"	Bailey Rae; Lassen	Hale	3:56
9.	"Breathless"	Bailey Rae; Nelkin	Chrisanthou	4:13
10.	"I'd Like To"	Bailey Rae; Danvers; Herman	Tommy D; Herman	4:05
11.	"Butterfly"	Bailey Rae; Bowkett	Chrisanthou	3:52
12.	"Seasons Change"	Bailey Rae; Steve Brown	RKW; Brown; Chrisanthou^{[a]}	4:53
Total length:				44:50

=== Notes ===
- ^{^[a]} signifies an additional producer
- ^{^[b]} signifies a remixer
- ^{^[c]} signifies a main and additional producer

== Personnel ==
Credits adapted from the liner notes of Corinne Bailey Rae.

=== Musicians ===
- Corinne Bailey Rae – vocals, backing vocals (all tracks); acoustic guitar (tracks 1, 3, 8, 10, 11); Spanish guitar (tracks 1, 11); percussion (tracks 1, 3, 5, 9, 10); electric guitar (tracks 2, 10); bass, piano (track 7); Moog, additional keyboards (track 10)
- Paul Siddal – keys (tracks 1, 2, 8, 10)
- Steve Chrisanthou – organ (tracks 1, 5); programming (tracks 1–3, 5, 8, 10); electric guitar (tracks 2, 3, 5, 8, 10); Spanish guitar, horn sampling, percussion (track 3); piano (track 10)
- The London Session Orchestra – strings (tracks 1, 2, 6, 10)
- Gavyn Wright – director of The London Session Orchestra (tracks 1, 2, 6, 10)
- Wil Malone – string arrangement and conducting (tracks 1, 2, 6, 10)
- Rod Bowkett – bass, acoustic guitar (track 2)
- John Beck – keyboard (tracks 3, 5)
- Joe Tatton – Hammond organ (track 3)
- Cara Robinson – additional backing vocals (track 3)
- Jason Rae – alto saxophone (tracks 3, 5, 8–10); baritone saxophone (tracks 8, 9); flute (track 11)
- Jim Corry – tenor saxophone (tracks 3, 5, 8–10)
- Malcolm Strachan – trumpet (tracks 3, 5, 8–10)
- Sam Dixon – bass (track 3)
- Paul Herman – guitar, drum programming (track 4); acoustic guitar, electric guitar (track 9)
- Aubrey Nunn – bass guitar (track 4)
- Jess Bailey – Wurlitzer piano, Hammond organ (track 4)
- Justin Broad – drum programming (tracks 4, 9)
- Kenny Higgins – bass guitar (tracks 5, 8, 10, 11)
- Steve Bush – electric guitar, bass, programming (track 6)
- Andy Platts – Fender Rhodes, additional guitar (track 6)
- Steve Brown – Hammond organ, additional Fender Rhodes (track 6); backing vocals, Jupiter synths, music box sampling, Wurlitzer piano (track 11)
- Andrew Hale – grand piano, programming (track 7)
- Pete Lewinson – drums (track 7)
- Kenji Jammer – electric guitar, acoustic guitar (track 7)
- Colin Waterman – drums (track 8)
- Paul McKendrick – additional backing vocals (track 8)
- Livingston Brown – bass guitar (track 9)
- Tommy D – keys, drum programming (track 9)
- Mikey Lawrence – drums, percussion (track 11)
- John Ellis – glockenspiel, backing vocals (track 11)
- Yvonne Ellis – programming (track 11)

=== Technical ===
- Steve Chrisanthou – recording, production (tracks 1–3, 5, 8, 10); additional production (tracks 6, 11); mixing (track 11)
- Jeremy Wheatley – mixing (tracks 1–3, 5, 6, 8, 10)
- Rod Bowkett – additional production (track 2)
- Justin Broad – engineering (tracks 4, 9); production (track 4)
- Jimmy Hogarth – additional production (track 3)
- Paul Herman – mixing, production (tracks 4, 9)
- Steve Bush – production (track 6)
- Andrew Hale – production (track 7)
- Mike Pela – mixing (track 7)
- David Ayers – engineering (track 7)
- Ian Duncan – engineering (track 7)
- Tommy D – production, mixing (track 9)
- Steve Brown – additional recording, production (track 11)
- Yvonne Ellis – engineering (track 11)
- Dan Hope – additional recording (track 11)
- RKW – production (track 11)

=== Artwork ===
- Irene Rukerebuka – design, photography
- Darren Lewis – artwork
- Emma Hardy – additional photography inside booklet

== Charts ==
=== Weekly charts ===
Weekly chart performance for Corinne Bailey Rae
Chart (2006–2013)	Peak position
Australian Albums (ARIA)	54
Austrian Albums (Ö3 Austria)	7
Belgian Albums (Ultratop Flanders)	27
Belgian Albums (Ultratop Wallonia)	51
Canadian Albums (Billboard)	8
Danish Albums (Hitlisten)	18
Dutch Albums (Album Top 100)	8
European Albums (Billboard)	5
French Albums (SNEP)	26
German Albums (Offizielle Top 100)	18
Hungarian Albums (MAHASZ)	32
Irish Albums (IRMA)	2
Italian Albums (FIMI)	13
Japanese Albums (Oricon)	29
New Zealand Albums (RMNZ)	6
Norwegian Albums (VG-lista)	39
Polish Albums (ZPAV)	35
Portuguese Albums (AFP)	18
Scottish Albums (Official Charts)	1
Spanish Albums (Promusicae)	11
Swedish Albums (Sverigetopplistan)	44
Swiss Albums (Schweizer Hitparade)	8
UK Albums (Official Charts)	1
UK Albums (Official Charts) Special edition	69
UK R&B Albums (Official Charts)	1
US Billboard 200	4
US Top R&B/Hip-Hop Albums (Billboard)	3

=== Year-end charts ===
2006 year-end chart performance for Corinne Bailey Rae
Chart (2006)	Position
Dutch Albums (Album Top 100)	31
French Albums (SNEP)	89
German Albums (Offizielle Top 100)	80
Swiss Albums (Schweizer Hitparade)	73
UK Albums (OCC)	13
Worldwide Albums (IFPI)	22

2007 year-end chart performance for Corinne Bailey Rae
Chart (2007)	Position
UK Albums (OCC)	141
US Billboard 200	28
US Top R&B/Hip-Hop Albums (Billboard)	23

== Certifications ==
Certifications for Corinne Bailey Rae
Region	Certification	Certified units/sales
Brazil (Pro-Música Brasil)	Gold	30,000^{*}
Canada (Music Canada)	Platinum	100,000^{^}
Denmark (IFPI Danmark)	Platinum	20,000^{‡}
France (SNEP)	Gold	75,000^{*}
Germany (BVMI)	Gold	100,000^{^}
Ireland (IRMA)	2× Platinum	30,000^{^}
Netherlands (NVPI)	Gold	35,000^{^}
New Zealand (RMNZ)	Platinum	15,000^{^}
Spain (Promusicae)	Gold	40,000^{^}
Switzerland (IFPI Switzerland)	Gold	15,000^{^}
United Kingdom (BPI)	3× Platinum	968,341
United States (RIAA)	Platinum	1,900,000
Summaries
Europe (IFPI)	Platinum	1,000,000^{*}
^{*} Sales figures based on certification alone.^{^} Shipments figures based on certification alone.^{‡} Sales+streaming figures based on certification alone.

== Release history ==
Release history for Corinne Bailey Rae
Region	Date	Edition	Label	Ref.
Ireland	24 February 2006	Standard	EMI	
United Kingdom	27 February 2006	Standard	EMI	
Germany	3 March 2006	Standard	EMI	
Australia	17 March 2006	Standard	EMI	
Canada	20 June 2006	Standard	EMI	
United States	20 June 2006	Standard	Capitol	
Japan	12 July 2006	Standard	EMI	
Japan	29 November 2006	Limited	EMI	
United States	6 February 2007	Deluxe	Capitol	
United Kingdom	12 February 2007	Special	EMI	
Canada	13 February 2007	Deluxe	EMI	
Germany	16 February 2007	Special	EMI	
United Kingdom	13 August 2021	15th Anniversary	Virgin	
United States	13 August 2021	15th Anniversary	Capitol	
