= Like a Star =

2005 single by Corinne Bailey Rae

- UK CD single cover

Single by Corinne Bailey Rae

from the album Corinne Bailey Rae
- B-side: "Enchantment"; "Choux Pastry Heart"
- Released: 7 November 2005
- Recorded: 2005
- Studio: The Idle Studio
- Genre: Pop-soul
- Length: 4:01
- Label: EMI
- Songwriter(s): Corinne Bailey Rae
- Producer(s): Steve Chrisanthou

Corinne Bailey Rae singles chronology
"Like a Star" (2005)	"Put Your Records On" (2006)

"Like a Star" is a song by English singer-songwriter Corinne Bailey Rae, released as the lead single from her self-titled debut studio album (2006). It was written by Bailey Rae and produced by Steve Chrisanthou. The song was originally released in the United Kingdom on 7 November 2005 as a limited edition of 3,000 copies, reaching number 34 on the UK Singles Chart. An accompanying music video was directed by James Griffiths.

The single was re-released on 9 October 2006, reaching a new peak position of number 32 on the UK Singles Chart. "Like a Star" was nominated for Song of the Year at the 50th Grammy Awards.

== Track listings ==
- UK CD single
1. "Like a Star"
2. "Enchantment"
3. "Choux Pastry Heart"
- UK 7-inch single

A. "Like a Star"
B. "Enchantment"

== Credits and personnel ==
Credits adapted from the liner notes of Corinne Bailey Rae.

- Corinne Bailey Rae – acoustic guitar, backing vocals, lead vocals, percussion, songwriting, Spanish guitar
- Steve Chrisanthou – organ, production, programming, recording
- The London Session Orchestra – strings
- Wil Malone – string arrangement and conducting
- Paul Siddal – keyboards
- Jeremy Wheatley – mixing
- Gavyn Wright – director of The London Session Orchestra

== Charts ==
Chart (2005–06)	Peak position
European Hot 100 Singles (Billboard)	99
Hungary (Rádiós Top 40)	24
Scotland (OCC)	42
UK Singles (OCC)	34
UK Hip Hop/R&B (OCC)	6

Chart (2012)	Peak position
South Korea International Singles (Gaon)	73

== Certifications ==
Region	Certification	Certified units/sales
South Korea (Gaon) (Note: Sales from 2012)	—	240,153
United Kingdom (BPI)	Silver	200,000^{‡}
United States (RIAA)	Platinum	1,000,000^{‡}
^{‡} Sales+streaming figures based on certification alone.

== Re-release ==
"Like a Star"
- UK CD single 1 cover

Single by Corinne Bailey Rae

from the album Corinne Bailey Rae
- B-side: "Emaraldine"; "Enchantment" (Amp Fiddler Remix); "Daydreaming"
- Released: 9 October 2006
- Label: EMI

"Like a Star" was re-released in the UK on 9 October 2006 due to the popularity of the song. A new music video, directed by Sam Brown, was shot for the reissue. The single reached a new peak position of number 32 on the UK Singles Chart. "Like a Star" was released in the United States in January 2007, reaching number 56 on the Billboard Hot 100. As of January 2010, the song had sold 327,000 downloads in the US.

Bailey Rae performed "Like a Star" and "Put Your Records On" live on the 7 October 2006 episode of NBC's Saturday Night Live. She also performed "Like a Star" and "Trouble Sleeping" on NBC's Studio 60 on the Sunset Strip on 27 November 2006. The song was used in the ABC shows Grey's Anatomy and Men in Trees, as well as in an episode of NBC's Medium and CBS' CSI: NY. The track was also featured in the films Nancy Drew (2007) and 27 Dresses (2008). Rae performed "Like a Star" at the 49th Grammy Awards on 11 February 2007. The following year, it received a nomination for Song of the Year at the 50th Grammy Awards.

=== Track listings ===
- UK CD single 1
1. "Like a Star"
2. "Emaraldine"
- UK CD single 2
1. "Like a Star"
2. "Emaraldine"
3. "Enchantment" (Amp Fiddler Remix)
4. "Daydreaming" (Aretha Franklin cover)
5. "Like a Star" (re-release video)
- UK 7-inch single

A. "Like a Star"
B. "Enchantment" (Amp Fiddler Remix)

- Download
1. "Like a Star" (acoustic)
2. "Like a Star" (instrumental)

=== Charts ===
Chart (2006–07)	Peak position
European Hot 100 Singles (Billboard)	96
Netherlands (Single Top 100)	100
Scotland (OCC)	31
UK Singles (OCC)	32
UK Hip Hop/R&B (OCC)	6
US Billboard Hot 100	56
US Adult R&B Songs (Billboard)	18
US Adult Pop Airplay (Billboard)	33
US Hot R&B/Hip-Hop Songs (Billboard)	59
US Pop 100 (Billboard)	47
US Smooth Jazz Songs (Billboard)	30
