= Steve Chrisanthou =

British songwriter, producer, engineer

Steve Chrisanthou is a British songwriter, music producer, and recording engineer. He is a Grammy Award, Ivor Novello Award and Brit Award nominee, and a MOBO Award winner for co-writing the song "Put Your Records On" with John Beck and Corinne Bailey Rae. In 2008, Chrisanthou won a National Academy of Recording Arts and Sciences award for his vocal engineering on River: The Joni Letters, a Grammy Award-winning album by Herbie Hancock.

== Early life ==
Chrisanthou was born in Bradford, West Yorkshire, England on 21 January 1967 to a Greek Cypriot father George and English mother Rosemary, he had 3 siblings, Melinda, Danny and David & 5 maternal cousins, Karen, Allyson, Vanessa, Michael & Gillian. He started playing guitar at the age of nine. Chrisanthou played guitar in various local bands and did session work from the age of fourteen. Whilst at Pollard Park middle school, Chrisanthou became noted for his football skills.

== Personal life ==
Chrisanthou married award-winning wildlife artist Stella Mays in 2005. They have two children, one named Edward and another called Archie who both do bike riding for hobbies, also has a child to a previous partner. He is based in Hebden Bridge West Yorkshire, England.

== Music career ==
Chrisanthou began his production career around 1998 with a number of local artists and eventually signed a production/publishing agreement to Goodgroove Songs in 2004. Goodgroove is part-owned by ex-BBC Radio 1 DJ Gary Davies.

Fellow Bradfordian songwriter/producer John Beck introduced Chrisanthou to Corinne Bailey Rae, and they began to write and demo material for her debut album, Corinne Bailey Rae. It was released in February 2006 by EMI. The first single from the album, "Put Your Records On", released in 2006, was co-written with Beck and Bailey Rae and produced by Chrisanthou with additional production from Jimmy Hogarth. The single went on to sell over one million copies. The follow-up single Trouble Sleeping was also written by the same personnel and achieved Top 40 in the UK in 2006. The album eventually went on to sell over four million copies worldwide. It was nominated for many international awards, including a Grammy and won a MOBO. In 2007 "Put Your Records On" won an ASCAP Award for 'Song Of The Year'. Songs from the first album were also featured in the 2006 film Venus (film).

In 2005, John Beck (songwriter) and Chrisanthou, along with writer Charles Hutchinson, wrote "Show A Little Faith" which appeared on the Charlotte Church album, Tissues and Issues.

In 2007, Chrisanthou recorded "River" with Corinne Bailey Rae for Herbie Hancock's River: The Joni Letters.

Chrisanthou produced four tracks on Bailey Rae's second album The Sea released in January 2010. The album was nominated for a Mercury Prize.

Chrisanthou has gone on to produce and co-write with many artists such as Dragonette - Chrisanthou wrote the 2007 single "Take It Like A Man" from the album Galore (Dragonette album), Michael Bolton - Chrisanthou co-produced many of the tracks on the 2009 album One World One Love), Will Young, Paloma Faith, Lianne La Havas, a rare co-write with Ashford & Simpson and Bobby McFerrin. Chrisanthou has also worked with artists such as Jenniffer Kae, Greta's Bakery, Simon Webbe, Terri Walker and Indiana (singer) - Chrisanthou co-wrote her 2014 UK Top 40 song "Solo Dancing" and Eliza Doolittle - Chrisanthou co-wrote and produced the 2011 release Mr Medicine.

Chrisanthou co-wrote and co-produced two songs from third album by Bailey Rae called The Heart Speaks in Whispers, which was released on 13 May 2016. Both songs were the first singles off the new album. He also has co-produced two further songs on the album. Chrisanthou produced Davy Knowles' album 'The Outsider' in 2015 and continues to nurture up-and-coming artists.

Chrisanthou co-wrote, mixed and produced "Show Me" by Gabrielle released in May 2018, her first release in nine years and it was featured on BBC Radio 2. Chrisanthou has also co-written, mixing and produced "Take A Minute", "Young and Crazy" and "Stronger" from Gabrielle's album Under My Skin, released on 17 August 2018.

Chrisanthou has also been working with UK based American singer Kate Earl and up-and-coming Scottish singer/songwriter Callum Beattie. Chrisanthou co-wrote and co-produced the song "Mouth Of A Tiger" with Callum and Jim Duguid on the new album People Like Us, released in May 2020. He also co-wrote/produced Braveheart with Beattie in 2018.

2020 has seen Chrisanthou involved with writing and production for new American neo soul artist, Nyah Grace. He co-wrote and produced eight songs on her album Honey-Coloured released in July 2020; "Honey Coloured", "Magnolia", "My Sista Told Me" (with Corinne Bailey Rae), "Sunday", "I Just Wish You Call Me", "And I Love Him", "Sooner or Later" and "Summer Luvin'". He mixed all the songs on the album.

Chrisanthou has formed a publishing company called Trinity Songs with John Beck (songwriter) and Matthew Rumbold.
