= Breathless (Corinne Bailey Rae song) =

Single by Corinne Bailey Rae

from the album Corinne Bailey Rae
- Released: 30 November 2007 (airplay)
- Recorded: 2006
- Length: 4:15
- Label: Capitol
- Songwriter(s): Corinne Bailey Rae, Marc Nelkin
- Producer(s): Steve Chrisanthou

Corinne Bailey Rae singles chronology
"I'd Like To" (2007)	"Breathless" (2007)	"I'd Do It All Again" (2009)

"Breathless" is the fifth and final single from Corinne Bailey Rae's debut album, Corinne Bailey Rae. Released in 2007 only in the United States.

== Released and charts performance ==
"Breathless" started receiving digital download on the iTunes Store on 6 February 2007, prior to its official single release on 30 November 2007. The song charted only on the US Hot R&B/Hip-Hop Songs chart at number 70, and spent 12 weeks on the chart.

== Charts ==
Chart (2007)	Peak position
Billboard Hot R&B/Hip-Hop Songs	70

== Radio and release history ==
Region	Date	Format
United States	6 February 2007	Digital download
United States	30 November 2007	Radio
