= Black Rainbows (Corinne Bailey Rae album) =

Studio album by Corinne Bailey Rae
- Released: 15 September 2023
- Genres: R&B; jazz; neo-soul; garage rock
- Length: 44:34
- Labels: Black Rainbows; Thirty Tigers
- Producers: S. J. Brown; Corinne Bailey Rae; Paris Strother

Corinne Bailey Rae chronology
The Heart Speaks in Whispers (2016)	Black Rainbows (2023)

Black Rainbows is the fourth studio album by English singer and songwriter Corinne Bailey Rae, released on 15 September 2023 by Black Rainbows Music and Thirty Tigers. It received acclaim from critics, and was nominated for the 2024 Mercury Prize.

== Background ==
Bailey Rae stated that Black Rainbows was inspired by an exhibition on Black history by artist Theaster Gates at the Stony Island Arts Bank in Chicago that she attended, which "summoned thoughts about slavery, spirituality, beauty, survival, hope and freedom".

== Critical reception ==
Professional ratings
Aggregate scores
Source	Rating
AnyDecentMusic?	8.7/10
Metacritic	91/100
Review scores
Source	Rating
AllMusic	4.5/5 stars
Mojo	4/5 stars
MusicOMH	4.5/5 stars
NME	4/5 stars
Pitchfork	8.0/10
Record Collector	5/5 stars
Uncut	8/10

Black Rainbows received a score of 91 out of 100 on review aggregator Metacritic based on seven critics' reviews, indicating "universal acclaim". Uncut described it as "an inspired left turn", while Mojo stated that "the music, which is characterised by extraordinary switches in style, reflects the diversity of the archive, morphing from bleepy electronic and futuristic R&B to churning garage rock with distorted megaphone vocals". Record Collector's John Earls wrote that Black Rainbows "magnificently roars around garage rock, jazz and even, on Erasure, Black Flag hardcore", concluding that "although Bailey Rae is hardly prolific – this is just her fourth album – she's worth the wait".

Jordan Bassett of NME remarked that the album "swings from crunching glam-punk to skronking experimental jazz that wouldn't sound out of place on David Bowie's Blackstar. There are left turns, and then there's this." MusicOMH's John Murphy found it to be "a huge change in direction for Corinne Bailey Rae, a big, sprawling album that bounces between genres and flies off in directions you'd never expect". Jon Pareles of The New York Times opined that Bailey Rae "boldly jettisons both pop structures and R&B smoothness to consider the scars and triumphs of Black culture" and its "songs flaunt extremes: noise and delicacy, longing and rage". Allison Hussey of Pitchfork felt that "it sounds like a departure but feels like a renaissance", and the "softer turns on Black Rainbows feel nearest to Rae's earlier material, but those, too, subvert expectations".

Reviewing the album for AllMusic, Andy Kellman compared it favourably to Bailey Rae's earlier work, writing that "although Black Rainbows is a uniquely conceptual work and sticks all the way out from" her prior albums, it is "at least as personal" as them, observing that "contrary to her reputation for making pillowy adult contemporary R&B, Bailey Rae started in a punk band that was hard enough to be courted by Roadrunner Records" and "Black Rainbows taps into that spirit more than once".

== Track listing ==
All tracks are written by Corinne Bailey Rae, except where noted.

No.	Title	Length
1.	"A Spell, a Prayer"	5:26
2.	"Black Rainbows" (Corinne Bailey Rae, S. J. Brown, Myke Wilson)	1:57
3.	"Erasure"	2:46
4.	"Earthlings" (Bailey Rae, Brown)	3:38
5.	"Red Horse" (Bailey Rae, Brown, Amber Strother, Paris Strother)	5:42
6.	"New York Transit Queen"	1:49
7.	"He Will Follow You with His Eyes"	3:45
8.	"Put It Down" (Bailey Rae, Brown)	8:29
9.	"Peach Velvet Sky" (Bailey Rae, Brown)	5:50
10.	"Before the Throne of the Invisible God"	5:12
Total length:		44:34

2024 digital edition bonus tracks
No.	Title	Length
1.	Untitled (Bailey Rae, Brown)
11.	"SilverCane"	4:02
12.	"Before the Throne of the Invisible God" (Shawn Everett mix)	5:12
Total length:		53:48

== Personnel ==
Musicians

- Corinne Bailey Rae – lead vocals (all tracks), background vocals (tracks 1, 3–8, 10), guitar (1, 3, 5, 6, 8), percussion (1, 4, 5, 10), flute (2, 10), electric piano (1)
- S. J. Brown – background vocals (2, 10)
- Paris Strother – background vocals (5)
- Amber Strother – background vocals (5)
- Marvin Tate – background vocals (8)
- Yaw Agyeman – background vocals (8)

Technical

- S. J. Brown – production, engineering (all tracks), mixing (10)
- Corinne Bailey Rae – production (1, 3–10)
- Paris Strother – production (5), engineering (5, 7)
- Matt Colton – mastering
- Shawn Everett – mixing (1–9)
- Ian Gold – mixing (9)
- James Knight – engineering (2)
- Todd A. Carter – engineering (8)
- Aaron Burnett – engineering (10)
- Andy Bauer – engineering (10)
- Aaron Burnett – engineering (10)

== Charts ==
Chart performance for Black Rainbows
Chart (2023)	Peak position
Scottish Albums (Official Charts)	54
UK Album Downloads (Official Charts)	32
UK Independent Albums (Official Charts)	13
US Top Album Sales (Billboard)	92
