= The Heart Speaks in Whispers =

Studio album by Corinne Bailey Rae
- Released: 13 May 2016
- Recorded: 2015–2016
- Genre: R&B
- Length: 55:31
- Label: Virgin EMI
- Producers: Stephen James Brown; Steve Chrisanthou; James Ryan Ho; Corinne Bailey Rae; Paris Strother

Corinne Bailey Rae chronology
The Love EP (2011)	The Heart Speaks in Whispers (2016)	Black Rainbows (2023)

The Heart Speaks in Whispers is the third studio album by English singer and songwriter Corinne Bailey Rae, released on 13 May 2016 by Virgin EMI Records.

== Critical reception ==
Professional ratings
Aggregate scores
Source	Rating
AnyDecentMusic?	6.9/10
Metacritic	74/100
Review scores
Source	Rating
AllMusic	4/5 stars
Drowned in Sound	4/5 stars
Exclaim!	8/10
The Guardian	3/5 stars
The Independent	2/5 stars
musicOMH	4/5 stars
Pitchfork	7.6/10
PopMatters	3.5/5 stars

The Heart Speaks in Whispers received generally positive reviews from music critics. At Metacritic, which assigns a normalized rating out of 100 to reviews from mainstream critics, the album received an average score of 74 based on 17 reviews, which indicates "generally favorable reviews". In a positive review, Andy Kellman of AllMusic stated "The more electrified and groove-oriented material is bound to elicit parallels drawn to the likes of early Erykah Badu and, well, King." Writing for Exclaim!, Ebyan Abdigir called the album "thoughtful and light, with an emotional range and sharp artistic direction that was lacking on her past records."

== Commercial performance ==
In the United States, the album debuted at number 31 on the Billboard 200, selling 14,000 copies in its first week.

== Track listing ==
The Heart Speaks in Whispers – Standard edition
No.	Title	Writer(s)	Producer(s)	Length
1.	"The Skies Will Break"	Corinne Bailey Rae; Stephen James Brown	Bailey Rae; Brown	4:53
2.	"Hey, I Won't Break Your Heart"	Bailey Rae	Bailey Rae; Brown	4:48
3.	"Been to the Moon"	Bailey Rae; Brown; Amber Strother; Paris Strother	Bailey Rae; Brown	4:04
4.	"Tell Me"	Bailey Rae; Brown; Steve Chrisanthou; P. Strother	Bailey Rae; Brown; P. Strother	4:08
5.	"Stop Where You Are"	Bailey Rae; Chrisanthou	Bailey Rae; Chrisanthou	4:10
6.	"Green Aphrodisiac"	Bailey Rae; P. Strother; A. Strother	Bailey Rae; Brown; P. Strother	5:51
7.	"Horse Print Dress"	Bailey Rae; Brown; P. Strother; A. Strother; Chrisanthou	Bailey Rae; Brown	4:03
8.	"Do You Ever Think of Me?"	Bailey Rae; Valerie Simpson; Curtis Mayfield	Bailey Rae; Brown	5:26
9.	"Caramel"	Bailey Rae	Bailey Rae; Brown	5:15
10.	"Taken by Dreams"	Bailey Rae; Brown; John Hill	Bailey Rae; Brown	3:55
11.	"Walk On"	Bailey Rae	Bailey Rae; Brown	4:26
12.	"Night"	Bailey Rae	Bailey Rae; Brown	4:32
Total length:				55:31

The Heart Speaks in Whispers – Deluxe edition (bonus tracks)
No.	Title	Writer(s)	Producer(s)	Length
13.	"In the Dark"	Bailey Rae; James Ho	Bailey Rae; Brown; Ho	4:49
14.	"Ice Cream Colours"	Bailey Rae; Brown	Bailey Rae; Chrisanthou	3:15
15.	"High"	Bailey Rae; Chuck Harmony; Claude Kelly	Bailey Rae; Brown	5:46
16.	"Push On for the Dawn"	Bailey Rae	Bailey Rae; Brown	6:11
Total length:				75:32

The Heart Speaks in Whispers – Target exclusive deluxe edition (bonus tracks)
No.	Title	Writer(s)	Producer(s)	Length
17.	"Stop Where You Are" (Live at Capitol Studios)	Bailey Rae; Chrisanthou	Bailey Rae; Chrisanthou	4:13
18.	"Hey, I Won’t Break Your Heart" (Live at Capitol Studios)	Bailey Rae	Bailey Rae; Brown	5:09
Total length:				84:54

== Charts ==
=== Weekly charts ===
Weekly chart performance for The Heart Speaks in Whispers
Chart (2016)	Peak position
Belgian Albums (Ultratop Flanders)	63
Belgian Albums (Ultratop Wallonia)	111
Dutch Albums (Album Top 100)	74
Irish Albums (IRMA)	100
Japanese Albums (Oricon)	79
UK Albums (Official Charts)	14
UK R&B Albums (Official Charts)	3
US Billboard 200	31
US Top R&B/Hip-Hop Albums (Billboard)	3

=== Year-end charts ===
Year-end chart performance for The Heart Speaks in Whispers
Chart (2016)	Position
US Top R&B/Hip-Hop Albums (Billboard)	73
