= Put Your Records On =

2006 single by Corinne Bailey Rae

Single by Corinne Bailey Rae

from the album Corinne Bailey Rae
- B-side: "Since I've Been Loving You"; "Another Rainy Day"
- Released: 20 February 2006
- Studio: The Idle
- Genre: Pop-soul; jazz; R&B
- Length: 3:34
- Label: EMI; Capitol
- Songwriters: Corinne Bailey Rae; John Beck; Steve Chrisanthou
- Producer: Steve Chrisanthou

Corinne Bailey Rae singles chronology
"Like a Star" (2005)	"Put Your Records On" (2006)	"Trouble Sleeping" (2006)

Music video
- "Put Your Records On" on YouTube

Alternative cover
- DVD single cover

"Put Your Records On" is a song by the English singer Corinne Bailey Rae from her self-titled debut studio album (2006). Written by Bailey Rae, John Beck, and Steve Chrisanthou, it was released as the album's second single in February 2006; in North America, it served as the album's lead single. The song spent several weeks on the UK Singles Chart and became her signature tune.

"Put Your Records On" was a commercial success, topping the UK R&B Chart and peaking at number two on the UK Singles Chart. It was nominated for Record of the Year and Song of the Year at the 2007 Grammy Awards. A cover by American indie rock project Ritt Momney, released in 2020, became a commercial success after going viral on TikTok.

== Song information ==
"Put Your Records On" is a jazz-infused pop-soul R&B ballad. The opening verse of the track pays homage to "Three Little Birds" by Bob Marley and the Wailers.

Produced by Steve Chrisanthou, "Put Your Records On" entered and peaked at number two on the UK Singles Chart on 26 February 2006—for the week ending dated 4 March 2006. It topped the UK Singles Downloads Chart and the UK R&B Singles Chart. In the United States, the single peaked at number 64 on the Billboard Hot 100; as of January 2010, the single had sold 945,000 downloads. Despite peaking at number two on the UK Singles Chart, the song became her signature tune.

The song earned a Grammy Award nomination for Song of the Year and Record of the Year in 2007.

The song was used in the 2006 film Venus starring Peter O'Toole. It is also featured in the 2009 film Alvin and the Chipmunks: The Squeakquel as a cover by The Chipettes.

== Track listings ==
- UK CD single
1. "Put Your Records On"
2. "Another Rainy Day"
- International CD single
1. "Put Your Records On"
2. "Another Rainy Day"
3. "Since I've Been Loving You" (Led Zeppelin cover)
- DVD single
1. "Put Your Records On"
2. "Put Your Records On" (video)
3. "Put Your Records On" (live at Bush Hall)
4. "Since I've Been Loving You" (Led Zeppelin cover)
- 7-inch single

A. "Put Your Records On"
B. "Since I've Been Loving You" (Led Zeppelin cover)

- Digital download
1. "Put Your Records On" (acoustic)
- iTunes Store digital download version 1
1. "Put Your Records On"
2. "Since I've Been Loving You" (Led Zeppelin cover)
- iTunes Store digital download version 2
1. "Put Your Records On"
2. "Another Rainy Day"
- iTunes Store single
1. "Put Your Records On"

== Personnel ==
Personnel are adapted from the liner notes of Corinne Bailey Rae.

- Corinne Bailey Rae – acoustic guitar, backing vocals, lead vocals, percussion, songwriting
- John Beck – keyboards, songwriting
- Steve Chrisanthou – electric guitar, horn sampling, percussion, production, programming, recording, songwriting, Spanish guitar
- Jim Corry – tenor saxophone
- Sam Dixon – bass
- Jimmy Hogarth – additional production
- Jason Rae – alto saxophone
- Cara Robinson – additional backing vocals
- Malcolm Strachan – trumpet
- Joe Tatton – Hammond organ
- Jeremy Wheatley – mixing

== Charts ==
=== Weekly charts ===
2006–2007 weekly chart performance for "Put Your Records On"
Chart (2006–2007)	Peak position
Australia (ARIA)	30
Austria (Ö3 Austria Top 40)	26
Belgium (Ultratip Bubbling Under Flanders)	4
Belgium (Ultratip Bubbling Under Wallonia)	4
Canada Hot 100 (Billboard)	59
Canada AC (Billboard)	13
Canada Hot AC (Billboard)	13
Czech Republic Airplay (ČNS IFPI)	19
European Hot 100 Singles (Billboard)	8
France (SNEP)	65
Germany (GfK)	75
Hungary (Rádiós Top 40)	5
Ireland (IRMA)	24
Italy (FIMI)	19
Netherlands (Dutch Top 40)	17
Netherlands (Single Top 100)	24
New Zealand (Recorded Music NZ)	6
Romania (Romanian Top 100)	60
Scottish Singles Sales (Official Charts)	4
Switzerland (Schweizer Hitparade)	23
UK Singles (Official Charts)	2
UK Hip Hop/R&B (Official Charts)	1
US Billboard Hot 100	64
US Adult Alternative Airplay (Billboard)	8
US Adult Contemporary (Billboard)	6
US Adult Pop Airplay (Billboard)	11
US Pop 100 (Billboard)	68
US Smooth Jazz Airplay (Billboard)	8

2010–2011 weekly chart performance for "Put Your Records On"
Chart (2010–2011)	Peak position
Japan (Japan Hot 100)	98
South Korea International (Circle)	73

=== Year-end charts ===
2006 year-end chart performance for "Put Your Records On"
Chart (2006)	Position
European Hot 100 Singles (Billboard)	94
Hungary (Rádiós Top 40)	35
Netherlands (Dutch Top 40)	97
Switzerland (Schweizer Hitparade)	92
UK Singles (OCC)	24
US Adult Contemporary (Billboard)	32
US Adult Top 40 (Billboard)	34
US Smooth Jazz Songs (Billboard)	29

2007 year-end chart performance for "Put Your Records On"
Chart (2007)	Position
US Adult Contemporary (Billboard)	13

== Certifications ==
Sales and certifications for "Put Your Records On"
Region	Certification	Certified units/sales
Brazil (Pro-Música Brasil)	Platinum	60,000^{‡}
Denmark (IFPI Danmark)	Platinum	90,000^{‡}
Italy (FIMI)	Gold	50,000^{‡}
New Zealand (RMNZ)	5× Platinum	150,000^{‡}
Spain (Promusicae)	Gold	30,000^{‡}
United Kingdom (BPI)	3× Platinum	1,800,000^{‡}
United States (RIAA)	3× Platinum	3,000,000^{‡}
^{‡} Sales+streaming figures based on certification alone.

== Release history ==
Release dates and formats for "Put Your Records On"
Region	Date	Format(s)	Label(s)	Ref.
United Kingdom	20 February 2006	CD	EMI	
Australia	3 April 2006	CD	EMI	
United States	17 April 2006	Triple A radio	Capitol	
United States	24 April 2006	Smooth jazz radio	Capitol	
United States	19 June 2006	Hot adult contemporary radio	Capitol	
United States	26 September 2006	Contemporary hit radio	Capitol	

== Ritt Momney version ==
"Put Your Records On"

Single by Ritt Momney
- Released: 24 April 2020
- Studio: Rutter's family home
- Genre: Indie pop; indie rock; bedroom pop; lo-fi
- Length: 3:30
- Label: Disruptor; Columbia
- Songwriters: Corinne Bailey Rae; John Beck; Steve Chrisanthou; Jack Rutter
- Producer: Jack Rutter

Ritt Momney singles chronology
"(If) the Book Doesn't Sell" (2019)	"Put Your Records On" (2020)

A cover of "Put Your Records On" was released by American indie rock solo project Ritt Momney on 24 April 2020, originally independently through DistroKid and later re-released through Disruptor Records and Columbia Records.

The song became a sleeper hit after gaining popularity on the video sharing service TikTok in September 2020. Domestically, it peaked at number 30 on the Billboard Hot 100. The song also charted in the top 40 of 15 countries, and peaked in the top 10 in Australia and New Zealand.

=== Background ===
During Rutter's childhood, his mother often played the original "Put Your Records On" while driving. He referred to the original as "one of the greatest pop songs of all time". He recorded "Put Your Records On" in the basement of his parents' home after experiencing a bout of depression brought on by the COVID-19 pandemic. In an interview with Rolling Stone, Rutter said, "I couldn’t handle writing a depressing song...I started playing around with the idea of manifesting happiness instead of projecting my own sadness."

The cover gained traction after being used in a makeup video on TikTok by user Skiian, starting a trend on the platform.

=== Commercial performance ===
Following its viral success, "Put Your Records On" debuted on the Billboard Hot 100 at number 96, having received 5.8 million streams and one thousand digital downloads domestically in the tracking week ending 1 October, eventually peaking at number 30. The song peaked at number 55 on the Billboard Global 200 chart. The song also debuted at number 82 on the US Rolling Stone Top 100.

Elsewhere, "Put Your Records On" debuted at number 36 in Australia, eventually peaking at number 10. The song also peaked at number 18 in Ireland, and at number 25 in the United Kingdom.

=== Charts ===
==== Weekly charts ====
Weekly chart performance for "Put Your Records On"
Chart (2020–2021)	Peak position
Australia (ARIA)	10
Austria (Ö3 Austria Top 40)	27
Belgium (Ultratop 50 Flanders)	49
Belgium (Ultratip Bubbling Under Wallonia)	13
Canada (Canadian Hot 100)	39
Czech Republic Singles Digital (ČNS IFPI)	65
Denmark (Tracklisten)	30
France (SNEP)	133
Germany (GfK)	52
Global 200 (Billboard)	55
Iceland (Tónlistinn)	21
Ireland (IRMA)	18
Lithuania (AGATA)	32
Netherlands (Dutch Tipparade 40)	5
Netherlands (Single Top 100)	31
New Zealand (Recorded Music NZ)	8
Norway (VG-lista)	12
Portugal (AFP)	30
Slovakia Singles Digital (ČNS IFPI)	67
Sweden (Sverigetopplistan)	23
Switzerland (Schweizer Hitparade)	34
UK Singles (Official Charts)	25
US Billboard Hot 100	30
US Adult Contemporary (Billboard)	14
US Adult Top 40 (Billboard)	5
US Mainstream Top 40 (Billboard)	3
US Rolling Stone Top 100	65

==== Year-end charts ====
Year-end chart performance for "Put Your Records On"
Chart (2021)	Position
Australia Hip-Hop/R&B (ARIA)	50
US Billboard Hot 100	93
US Adult Contemporary (Billboard)	34
US Adult Top 40 (Billboard)	24
US Mainstream Top 40 (Billboard)	20

=== Certifications ===
Sales and certifications for "Put Your Records On"
Region	Certification	Certified units/sales
Australia (ARIA)	Platinum	70,000^{‡}
Canada (Music Canada)	2× Platinum	160,000^{‡}
Denmark (IFPI Danmark)	Gold	45,000^{‡}
Mexico (AMPROFON)	Gold	30,000^{‡}
New Zealand (RMNZ)	2× Platinum	60,000^{‡}
Portugal (AFP)	Gold	5,000^{‡}
United Kingdom (BPI)	Gold	400,000^{‡}
United States (RIAA)	Platinum	1,000,000^{‡}
^{‡} Sales+streaming figures based on certification alone.

=== Releases ===
Release dates and formats for "Put Your Records On"
Region	Date	Format	Label	Ref.
Various	24 April 2020	Digital download; streaming	Disruptor; Columbia	
United States	6 October 2020	Alternative radio	Disruptor; Columbia	
Italy	30 October 2020	Contemporary hit radio	Disruptor; Columbia	
United States	4 January 2021	Adult contemporary radio	Disruptor; Columbia	
