= I'd Like To =

Single by Corinne Bailey Rae

from the album Corinne Bailey Rae
- B-side: "No Love Child"; "I Won't Let You Lie to Yourself"
- Released: 12 February 2007
- Recorded: 2005
- Genre: Soul; jazz
- Length: 4:05
- Label: EMI
- Songwriter(s): Corinne Bailey Rae; Tommy Danvers; Paul Herman
- Producer(s): Tommy D; Paul Herman

Corinne Bailey Rae singles chronology
"Trouble Sleeping" (2006)	"I'd Like To" (2007)	"Breathless" (2007)

"I'd Like To" is a song by English singer-songwriter Corinne Bailey Rae from her self-titled debut studio album (2006). It was released on 12 February 2007 as the album's fourth and final commercial single. It was released digitally in Mexico on 19 February 2007. In the United States, the song was serviced to hot adult contemporary radio on 11 June 2007.

"I'd Like To" was released in a slightly remixed and edited form for the single release. It became Rae's first single to miss the top 75 of the UK Singles Chart, peaking at number 79. The album version of "I'd Like To" was included on the soundtrack to the 2009 film He's Just Not That Into You.

== Music video ==
The music video for "I'd Like To" filmed in Los Angeles in November 2006. It starts with Rae at a formal pool party. Later she walks through some trees and plants and appears on a street. She goes walking down the street and trading accessories with people on the street. The video ends with Rae at a more fun pool party.

== Track listings ==
- UK CD single #1
1. "I'd Like To" (Radio Edit)
2. "No Love Child"
- UK CD single #2
1. "I'd Like To" (Radio Edit)
2. "I Won't Let You Lie to Yourself"
3. "I'd Like To" (Weekender Mix)
4. "I'd Like To" (video)
- UK 7" single

A. "I'd Like To" (Weekender Mix)
B. "I Won't Let You Lie To Yourself"

- Mexican digital download #1
1. "I'd Like To" (Radio Edit)
2. "No Love Child"
- Mexican digital download #2
1. "I'd Like To" (Radio Edit)
2. "I Won't Let You Lie to Yourself"
3. "I'd Like To" (Weekender Mix)

== Credits and personnel ==
Credits adapted from the liner notes of Corinne Bailey Rae.

- Corinne Bailey Rae – backing vocals, lead vocals, percussion, songwriting
- Justin Broad – drum programming, engineering
- Livingston Brown – bass guitar
- Jim Corry – tenor saxophone
- Tommy D – drum programming, keyboards, mixing, production, songwriting
- Paul Herman – acoustic guitar, electric guitar, mixing, production, songwriting
- Jason Rae – alto saxophone, baritone saxophone
- Malcolm Strachan – trumpet

== Charts ==
Chart (2007)	Peak position
Scotland (OCC)	34
UK Singles (OCC)	79
UK Hip Hop/R&B (OCC)	4
