= River: The Joni Letters =

Studio album by Herbie Hancock
- Released: September 25, 2007
- Recorded: 2006–2007
- Studios: Avatar, New York City; Ocean Way, Los Angeles; 600 ft, Yorkshire; NJP Tonstudio, Zürich
- Genre: Jazz
- Length: 67:49
- Label: Verve
- Producers: Herbie Hancock, Larry Klein

Herbie Hancock chronology
Possibilities (2005)	River: The Joni Letters (2007)	The Imagine Project (2010)

River: The Joni Letters is the fortieth studio album by American jazz pianist Herbie Hancock, released on September 25, 2007, by Verve. It is a tribute album featuring cover songs of music written by Canadian-American singer-songwriter Joni Mitchell.

The album peaked at number five on the US Billboard 200, enjoying a huge post-Grammy winning sales boost. Upon its release, River: The Joni Letters received generally positive reviews from critics and earned several accolades, including Grammy Awards for Album of the Year and Best Contemporary Jazz Album at the 50th Annual Grammy Awards. Hancock's quintet for the album are saxophonist Wayne Shorter, guitarist Lionel Loueke, bassist Dave Holland and drummer Vinnie Colaiuta.

== Background ==
Hancock is a longtime friend of Mitchell's, and both he and saxophonist Wayne Shorter, who plays throughout the album, had previously collaborated with Mitchell on her 1979 album Mingus, and both continued to work with her on occasion ever since.

Guest vocalists on River include Leonard Cohen, Tina Turner, Norah Jones, Corinne Bailey Rae, Luciana Souza and Mitchell herself.

== Reception ==
=== Critical reception ===
Professional ratings
Review scores
Source	Rating
About.com	4.5/5 stars
All About Jazz	(favorable)
AllMusic	4/5 stars
Robert Christgau	(2-star Honorable Mention)
Daily News	(favorable)
The Guardian	3/5 stars
New York	(favorable)
The New York Times	(favorable)
The New Yorker	(favorable)
The Penguin Guide to Jazz Recordings	3/4 stars
Time Out	4/6 stars

The album won the Grammy Award for Album of the Year in 2008.

=== Commercial performance ===
The album peaked at number 5 on the Billboard 200 after enjoying a huge post-Grammy sales boost. It also peaked at number 61 in Switzerland, number 70 in France and number 76 in the Netherlands.

== Accolades ==
On February 10, 2008, the album won the Album of the Year and Best Contemporary Jazz Album at the 50th Annual Grammy Awards. Hancock was competing with Kanye West, Foo Fighters, Amy Winehouse, and Vince Gill for the Album of the Year award. River was the third jazz album to win Album of the Year in the award's history. The first was The Music from Peter Gunn by Henry Mancini in 1959. The second was Getz/Gilberto by Stan Getz and João Gilberto in 1965. The track "Both Sides Now" was also nominated for Best Jazz Instrumental. Until Jon Batiste's win in 2022, Hancock was the last Black musician to receive the Album of the Year award at the Grammys.

== Track listing ==
All tracks are written by Joni Mitchell, except where noted.

No.	Title	Writer(s)	Length
1.	"Court and Spark" (feat. Norah Jones)		7:35
2.	"Edith and the Kingpin" (feat. Tina Turner)		6:32
3.	"Both Sides Now"		7:38
4.	"River" (feat. Corinne Bailey Rae)		5:25
5.	"Sweet Bird"		8:15
6.	"Tea Leaf Prophecy" (feat. Joni Mitchell)	Mitchell; Larry Klein	6:34
7.	"Solitude"	Eddie DeLange, Duke Ellington, Irving Mills	5:42
8.	"Amelia" (feat. Luciana Souza)		7:26
9.	"Nefertiti"	Wayne Shorter	7:30
10.	"The Jungle Line" (feat. Leonard Cohen)		5:00

Amazon.com exclusive version bonus tracks
No.	Title	Length
11.	"A Case of You"	7:36
12.	"All I Want" (feat. Sonya Kitchell)	4:15

iTunes bonus tracks
No.	Title	Length
11.	"Harlem in Havana"
12.	"I Had a King"

All four bonus tracks were released on the 10th anniversary reissue of the album in 2017.

== Personnel ==
- Herbie Hancock – piano
- Wayne Shorter – soprano and tenor saxophone
- Lionel Loueke – guitar
- Dave Holland – bass (except on bonus tracks)
- Vinnie Colaiuta – drums
- Larry Klein – bass on bonus tracks
- Dean Parks – guitar on bonus tracks
- Paulinho da Costa – percussion on bonus tracks
- Prince – guitar (uncredited) on "Edith and the Kingpin"

== Charts ==
Chart performance
Chart (2007–2008)	Peak position
Australian Hitseekers Albums (ARIA)	9
Australian Jazz & Blues Albums (ARIA)	4
Austrian Albums (Ö3 Austria)	67
Belgian Albums (Ultratop Flanders)	86
Canadian Albums (Billboard)	20
Dutch Albums (Album Top 100)	76
French Albums (SNEP)	70
German Albums (Offizielle Top 100)	54
Italian Albums (FIMI)	38
Polish Albums (ZPAV)	30
Spanish Albums (Promusicae)	57
Swedish Jazz Albums (Sverigetopplistan)	2
Swiss Albums (Schweizer Hitparade)	61
UK Albums (Official Charts)	179
UK Jazz & Blues Albums (Official Charts)	7
US Billboard 200	5
US Top Jazz Albums (Billboard)	1
