= Amp Fiddler =

American musician (1958–2023)

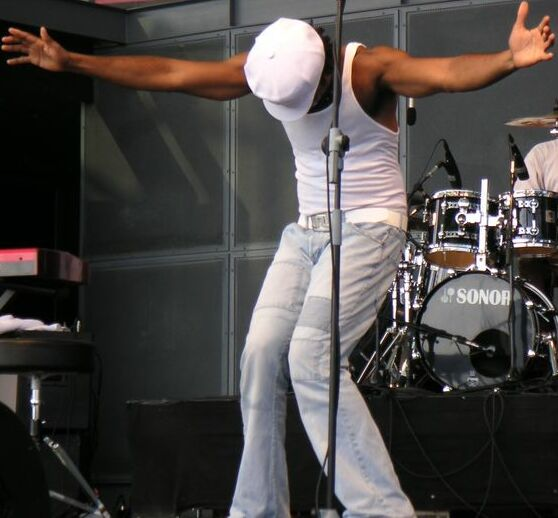
- Amp Fiddler in a concert in Waterfront, Toronto in 2004

Background information
- Born: Joseph Anthony Fiddler; May 16, 1958; Detroit, Michigan, U.S.
- Died: December 18, 2023 (aged 65) Detroit, Michigan, U.S.
- Genres: Soul; P funk; funk; R&B
- Occupations: Singer; songwriter; keyboardist; record producer
- Instruments: Vocals; keyboards
- Label: Ampliphonic
- Formerly of: Parliament; Funkadelic

Joseph Anthony "Amp" Fiddler (May 17, 1958 – December 18, 2023) was an American singer, songwriter, keyboardist, and record producer from Detroit, Michigan. His musical styles included funk, soul, dance and electronica. He was probably best known for his contributions to the band Enchantment, and as part of George Clinton's Parliament and Funkadelic groups from 1985 to 1996.

== Early life ==
Fiddler was born in Detroit on May 17, 1958. He began studying music at the age of 16. After graduating from high school, he continued studying music at Wayne County Community College, Oakland Community College, and Oakland University. He left Oakland University to go on tour full-time with Enchantment.

== Career ==
Fiddler began his career with the band Enchantment after meeting the lead singer through a friend and worked with the band for roughly three years. After his time with Enchantment, Fiddler began playing keyboard for George Clinton's Parliament-Funkadelic as a fill-in keyboardist before earning a spot in the permanent line-up. From there he met and worked with many prominent artists including Prince, Was (Not Was), Moodymann, Carl Craig, Juan Atkins, Kevin Saunderson, Jamiroquai, Brand New Heavies, Fishbone, Corinne Bailey Rae, and Neo-soul artist Maxwell.

Working with his brother, Bubz (bass guitarist, producer and songwriter), Fiddler released the album With Respect in 1991 on Elektra, recording under the name Mr. Fiddler. His debut album as Amp Fiddler, Waltz of a Ghetto Fly, was released on March 9, 2004. His final album, Basementality, was released in 2021.

After receiving an endorsement from Native Instruments, Fiddler approached the company with the idea of developing his own expansion pack for their music software. This led to the release of Amplified Funk and Conant Gardens in 2015

Fiddler received a Kresge Artist Fellowship in 2020.

Fiddler was credited with introducing hip-hop producer J Dilla to the Akai MPC sampling drum machine and also to A Tribe Called Quest member Q-Tip, who introduced the young Dilla into the music industry world.

In regard to Dilla's memory, Fiddler said:

The first beat he played for me he looped the whole track from cassette player to cassette player. There were a few drops, but for the most part it was pretty damn precise. So I told him he needs to go home and separate all the samples to load into the MPC, and he came back with all the samples separated and mapped out exactly how he wanted it. As time went on, he got better and better. He used to come by the crib to get on the MPC and he would work on it for three or four hours at a time. He used to have a big smile on his face, because he was so excited after finishing a beat.

== Personal life, illness, and death ==
Fiddler married Tombi Stewart in 2023. He had a son from a previous relationship.

Following ongoing health issues and recovery from surgery in 2022, a fundraiser was arranged for Fiddler in Detroit on December 10, 2023, to help cover his medical expenses. He died from cancer at Henry Ford Hospital in Detroit on December 18, 2023, at the age of 65.

== Legacy ==
Fiddler's influence on Detroit music continues with Camp Amp. A group led by Tombi Stewart aimed towards fostering musical collaboration and mentorship for upcoming Detroit artists.

On May 16, 2025, Revere street (the street he grew up on) was renamed in his honor to Amp Fiddler Ave.

== Discography ==
=== Albums ===
- With Respect (1991)
- Waltz of a Ghetto Fly (2004) – UK No. 82
- Afro Strut (2006) – UK No. 126
- Inspiration Information (2008) – with Sly and Robbie
- Motor City Booty (2016)
- Kindred Live (2017) – with Will Sessions
- Amp Dog Knights (2017)
- The One (2018) – with Will Sessions

=== Singles, maxi-singles, and EPs ===
- "Basementality" (2002)
- "Love and War" (2003)
- "Possibilities" (2003)
- "I Believe in You" (2003) – UK No. 72
- "Dreamin" (2004) – UK No. 71
- "Too High" (2004)
- "If You Can't Get Me Off Your Mind" (2004)
- "I Believe in You" (2004)
- "Eye to Eye" (2004)
- "Right Where You Are" (2006)
- "Ridin' / Faith" (2006)
- "Hope / Dope" (2006)
- "If I Don't" (2007) – featuring Corinne Bailey Rae
- "Find My Way" (2007)
- "Stay or Move On" (2008)
- "Inspiration Information" (2008) – with Sly and Robbie
- "Blackhouse (Paint the White House Black)" (2008) – with Sly and Robbie
- "Take It" (2014) – featuring Raphael Saadiq
- "Basementality 2" (2014)
- "Bassmentality 3" (2015)
- "Motor City Booty" (2016)
- "So Sweet" (2017)
- "Lost Without You" (2017) – with Will Sessions
- "Reminiscin'" (2017) – with Will Sessions
- "Rendezvous" (2017) – with Will Sessions
- "Keep Coming" (2019)
