= Trouble Sleeping (song) =

2006 single by Corinne Bailey Rae

- CD 1 cover

Single by Corinne Bailey Rae

from the album Corinne Bailey Rae
- Released: 29 May 2006
- Recorded: The Idle Studio
- Genre: Soul; smooth jazz
- Length: 3:27
- Label: EMI
- Songwriter(s): Corinne Bailey Rae; John Beck; Steve Chrisanthou
- Producer(s): Steve Chrisanthou

Corinne Bailey Rae singles chronology
"Put Your Records On" (2006)	"Trouble Sleeping" (2006)	"I'd Like To" (2007)

Alternative cover
- CD 2 cover

Music video
- "Trouble Sleeping" on YouTube

"Trouble Sleeping" is a song by English singer-songwriter Corinne Bailey Rae from her self-titled debut album (2006). It was written by Rae, John Beck and Steve Chrisanthou, and was released as the album's third single on 29 May 2006. Rae performed this song and "Like a Star" on the 27 November 2006 episode of the NBC comedy-drama series Studio 60 on the Sunset Strip. "Trouble Sleeping" was also featured on the NBC medical drama ER and on the CBS police procedural drama NCIS.

== Track listings ==
- UK CD 1 and 7-inch single / German CD single
1. "Trouble Sleeping" – 3:27
2. "Munich" (Radio 1 Live Lounge version) – 4:01
- UK CD 2 and German CD maxi single
1. "Trouble Sleeping" – 3:27
2. "Till It Happens to You" (live at Shepherd's Bush Empire) – 4:49
3. "Breathless" (live at Leeds Met) – 5:09
4. "Trouble Sleeping" (video)
- Digital download
1. "Trouble Sleeping" – 3:26
2. "Till It Happens to You" (live at Shepherd's Bush Empire) – 4:46
3. "Breathless" (live at Leeds Met) – 5:08

== Personnel ==
Credits adapted from the liner notes of Corinne Bailey Rae.

- Corinne Bailey Rae – vocals, backing vocals, percussion
- John Beck – keyboards
- Steve Chrisanthou – electric guitar, organ, production, programming, recording
- Jim Corry – tenor saxophone
- Kenny Higgins – bass guitar
- Jason Rae – alto saxophone
- Malcolm Strachan – trumpet
- Jeremy Wheatley – mixing

== Charts ==
=== Weekly charts ===
Chart (2006–07)	Peak position
Ireland (IRMA)	46
Italy (FIMI)	50
Netherlands (Dutch Top 40)	27
Netherlands (Single Top 100)	40
UK Singles (OCC)	40
US Smooth Jazz Songs (Billboard)	7

Chart (2012)	Peak position
South Korea International (Circle)	98

=== Year-end charts ===
Chart (2007)	Position
US Smooth Jazz Songs (Billboard)	20

== Radio and release history ==
Region	Date	Format	Label	Ref.
United Kingdom	29 May 2006	CD single; digital download; 7-inch single	EMI	
Germany	28 July 2006	CD maxi single	EMI	
Germany	18 August 2006	CD single	EMI	
United States	10 April 2007	Smooth jazz radio	Capitol	
