= The New Mastersounds =

British jazz fusion and funk band

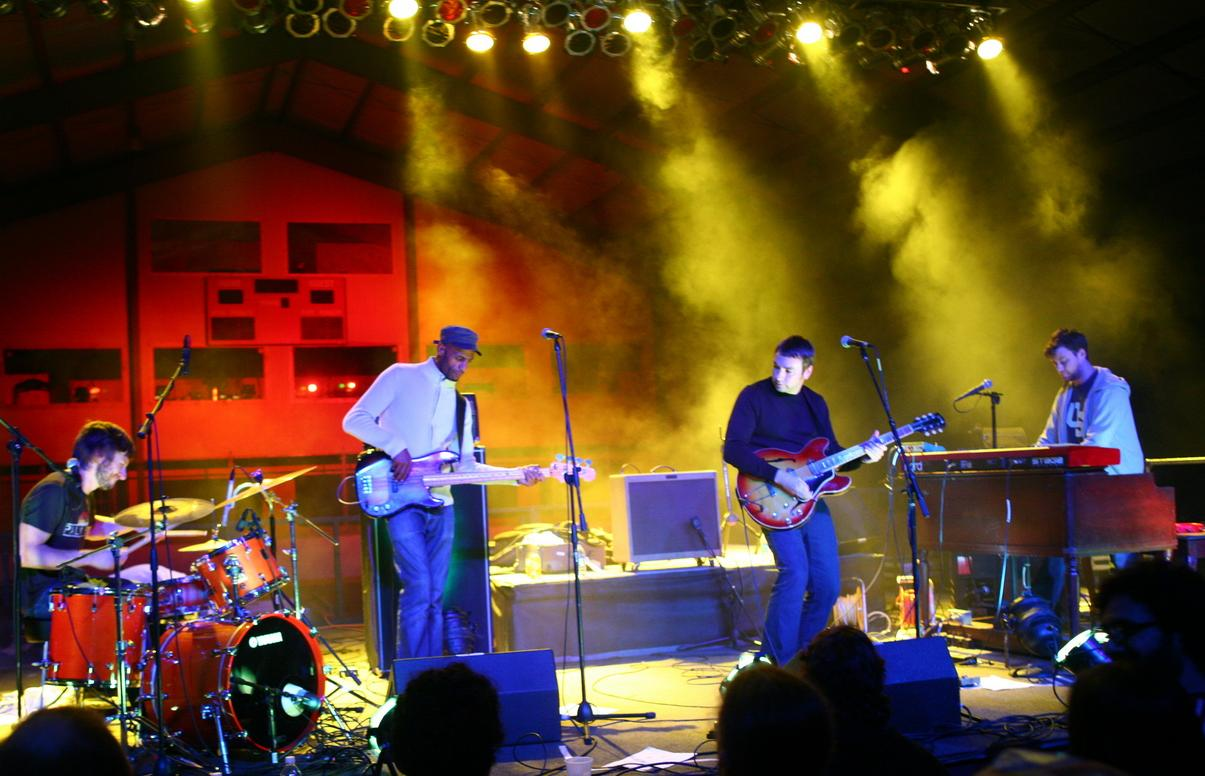
- The New Mastersounds performing live on Equifunk Music Festival in Equinunk, Pennsylvania, United States, 6 September 2009

Background information
- Origin: Leeds, England
- Genres: Funk, jazz fusion
- Years active: 1999–present
- Label: Various including Blow it Hard Records
- Members: Simon Allen; Eddie Roberts; Pete Shand; Joe Tatton
- Past members: Bob Birch; Rob Lavers
- Website: Newmastersounds.com/

The New Mastersounds are a British four-piece jazz fusion and blues/funk band from Leeds, England. Over the last 16 years, they have issued ten studio albums, two live dates, two remix collections, and a compilation album.

== History ==
In the late 1990s, guitarist and producer Eddie Roberts was running a night club in Leeds called The Cooker. When The Cooker moved into a new venue with a second floor in 1999, there was space and the opportunity to put a live band together to complement the DJ sets. Simon Allen and Roberts had played together in 1997 as The Mastersounds, with a different bassist and no organ. Through friends and the intimate nature of the Leeds music scene, Pete Shand and Bob Birch joined the band on bass and Hammond organ respectively, establishing The New Mastersounds. Their first rehearsal produced a release for Blow it Hard Records on two limited-edition 7" singles in 2000.

As a band, and as individuals, the New Mastersounds have collaborated with an array of musicians DJs and producers, including: Soul Rebels Brass Band, Lou Donaldson (Blue Note), Corinne Bailey Rae (EMI), Quantic (Tru Thoughts), Carleen Anderson (Young Disciples / Brand New Heavies), Keb Darge & Kenny Dope (Kay Dee Records), John Arnold (Ubiquity), Mr Scruff (Ninja Tuna), Snowboy (Ubiquity), Fred Everything (2020 Vision), Andy Smith (Portishead), James Taylor (JTQ), LSK (Faithless), and Karl Denson (Lenny Kravitz, Greyboy AllStars).

In 2006, as well as playing club gigs in France, Spain, Belgium and Italy, the band toured the US and Japan. In August, they finished recording their fifth album, 102% (released on One Note Records in 2007). The album featured collaborations with sax and flute player Rob Lavers, who went on to perform as a guest with the band on several subsequent tours. Also during 2006, producer/guitarist Eddie Roberts released a live album in Japan (Roughneck – Live in Paris), and produced a studio album of his own arrangements of traditional Italian songs called Trenta.

On their first Jamcruise, in 2007, the NMS played Meters tunes with George Porter Jr. sitting in. On their return to the UK, a capacity crowd at London's Jazz Cafe was on hand for the album launch of 102%. The band also performed tunes from the new album for Mark Lamarr on BBC Radio 2. Organist Bob Birch reluctantly retired from the band due to commitments at home, and Eddie, Simon, and Pete brought in another Leeds keyboard player, Joe Tatton, who had subbed for Bob in the past as well as worked with UK soul star Corinne Bailey Rae and The Haggis Horns. Joe's real initiation took place in April with the band's first trip to New Orleans, during which they played at the House of Blues and the Blue Nile and where Eddie sat in to play with Idris Muhammad, Lonnie Smith, Galactic, Papa Mali, and The Greyboy Allstars. Having enjoyed good receptions at the Wakarusa, Harmony, Gratefulfest, and High Sierra Music Festivals, the NMS traveled to Chicago at the end of July to play at Wicker Park and to open for The Headhunters.

After a break, the NMS regrouped in October for a two-week tour of France, during which they rediscovered the joy of the original four-piece NMS sound: bass, drums, guitar, and Hammond.

On the record front, German label Légère Recordings released their compilation An Introduction to The New Mastersounds on CD and LP in May 2007, while Milan-based record label Record Kicks put together an album of NMS tunes remixed by a host of talented underground funk and beats producers. That album, The New Mastersounds – Re::Mixed was released on CD, LP, and iTunes on 15 October 2007.

The NMS has issued eight albums since 2007. Their most recent, Renewable Energy, was recorded in Ohio and Denver and released in 2018. The band continues to tour and perform.

== One Note Records ==
Since 2003, The New Mastersounds have distributed their music via One Note Records. According to its website, One Note Records was set up by the New Mastersounds in 2003 and is named after the NMS dancefloor classic "One Note Brown".

== Discography ==
=== Albums ===
- Nervous, 12" EP, Deep Funk Records, 2001
- Keb Darge Presents The New Mastersounds, CD and LP, Deep Funk Records, 2001
- Keb Darge Presents The New Mastersounds (re-release), CD, Cooker Records, 2003
- Be Yourself, CD, One Note Records (UK), 2003
- Eddie Roberts: Roughneck, CD and double LP, One Note Records (UK), 2004
- Move On (NMS Remix), 12" EP, 2020 Vision Records, 2004
- This Is What We Do, CD and LP, One Note Records (UK) / 3 on the B Records (USA), 2005
- Live at La Cova, CD, 3 on the B Records (USA) / P-Vine Records (Japan), 2006
- 102%, CD and LP, One Note Records (UK), 2007 / 3 on the B Records (USA), 2007
- Plug & Play, CD and LP, One Note Records (UK), 2008
- Ten Years On, CD and LP, One Note Records (UK), 2009
- Breaks From The Border, CD and LP, Tallest Man Records (USA), 2011
- Out on the Faultline, CD and LP, One Note Records (UK), 2012
- Therapy, CD and LP, One Note Records (UK) / P-Vine Records (Japan) / Légère Recordings (Germany) / Dumaine Records, 2014
- Made For Pleasure, CD and LP, The Royal Potato Family (USA) / One Note Records (UK) / P-Vine Records (Japan) / Légère Recordings (Germany), 2015
- The Nashville Session, CD and LP, The Royal Potato Family (USA) / P-Vine Records (Japan), 2016
- Renewable Energy, CD and LP, One Note Records (UK), 2018
- The Nashville Session 2, CD and LP, One Note Records (UK) 2018
- Shake It, CD and LP, Color Red Records (USA), One Note Records (UK) 2019
- Old School, CD and LP, One Note Records (UK) 2024

=== Singles ===
- "One Note Brown" // "Burnt Black", 7" single, Blow It Hard Records BIH-003, 2000
- "Ode To Bobbie Gentry" // "Taurus", 7" single, Blow It Hard Records BIH-005, 2000
- "Fire" // "Foxy Lady" (with James Taylor), 7" single, Blow It Hard Records BIH-006, 2001
- "It's Alright Now" // "It's Alright Now (instrumental)", 7" single, Deep Funk Records DF-7003, 2001
- "Hot Dog" // "Drop It Down", 7" single, Deep Funk Records DF-7004, 2001
- "(So You Can) Get Back" // "Can't Hold Me Down", 7" single, Cooker Records NMS-7001, 2003
- "So Much Better" // "Better Off Dead", 7" single, Cooker Records NMS-7002, 2003
- "Nervous" // "Nervous (Bonus Beats)", 7" single, Kay Dee Records KD-001, 2003
- "Your Love Is Mine" (with Corinne Bailey Rae) // "This Ain't Work", 7" single, One Note Records ONR-7001, 2003
- "Baby Bouncer" // "The Minx", 7" single, One Note Records ONR-7002, 2004
- "Butter For Yo' Popcorn" // "Vanderberg Suite", 7" single, Soul Cookers Records (France) SCR-01, 2004
- "Two Note Brown" // "Fast Man", 7" single, Freestyle Records FSR-7007, 2005
- "Stay on the Groove" // "You Got It All", 7" single, Freestyle Records FSR-7015, 2005
- "Give Me A Minute (Pt. 1)" // "Give Me A Minute (Pt. 2)", 7" single, Our Label Records (Germany) OUR45-001, 2005
- "Believe (NMS Remix)", 7" single, 2020 Vision Records, 2005
- "Thirty Three" // "Talk Is Cheap", 7" single, One Note Records ONR-7003, 2006
- "King Comforter" (with Dionne Charles) // "All We Can Do" (with Dionne Charles), 7" single, One Note Records ONR-7004, 2008
- "Hole in the Bag" // "Hole in the Bag (Drawbar Remix)", 7" single, One Note Records ONR-7005, 2008
- "San Frantico" // "Chocolate Chip" (with Chip Wickham), 7" single, One Note Records ONR-7006, 2009
- "Yo Momma" // "You Mess Me Up", 7" single, One Note Records ONR-7007, 2012
- "Shake It" / "Permission To Land", 7" single, Color Red Records CRNMS-001, 2019
- "Let's Go Back", Digital single, 2019
