= Corinne Bailey Rae =

British singer (born 1979)

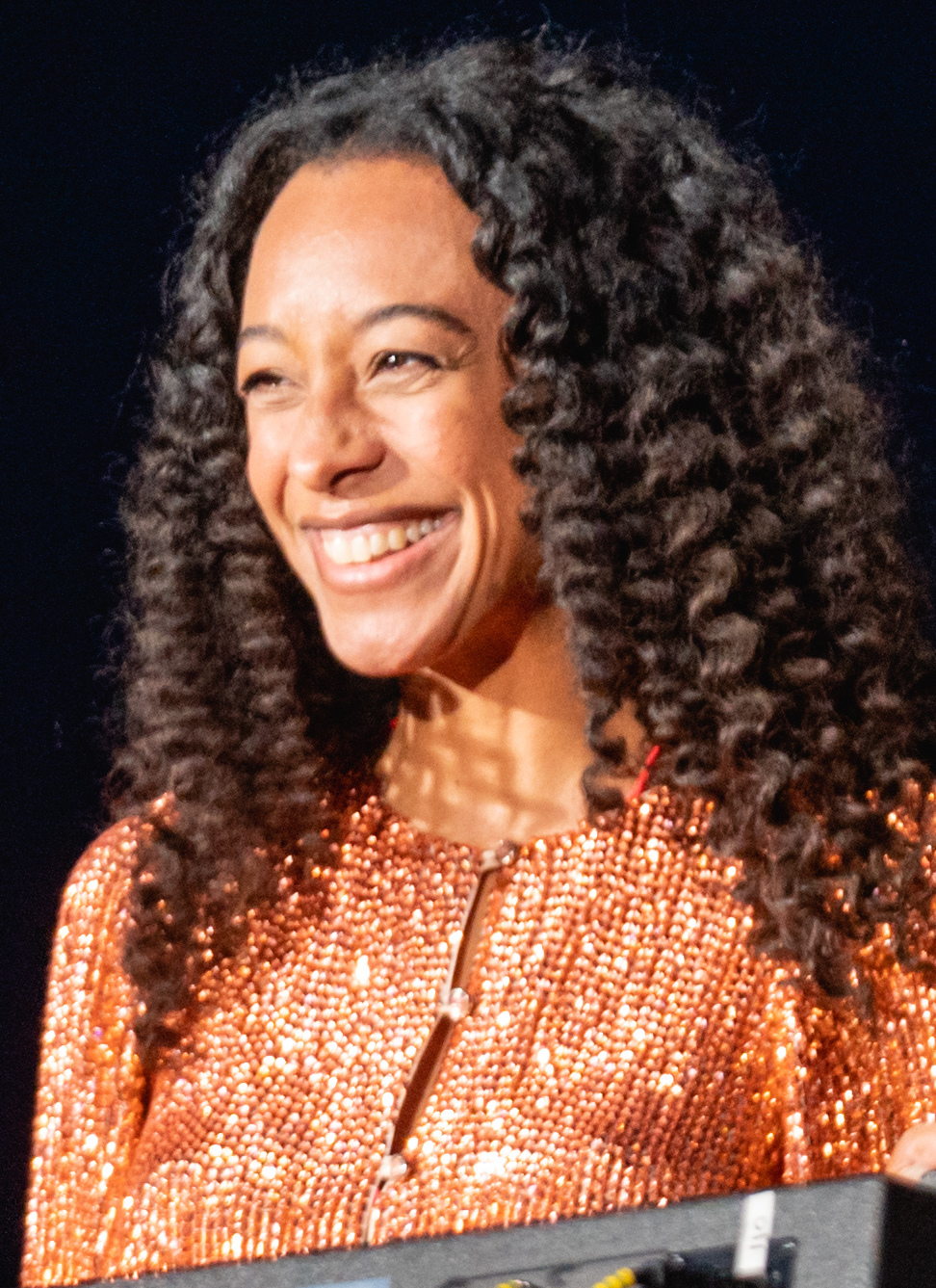
- Bailey Rae in 2019
- Born: Corinne Jacqueline Bailey; 26 February 1979 (age 47); Leeds, West Yorkshire, England
- Occupations: Singer; songwriter
- Years active: 1998–present
- Spouses: Jason Rae (m. 2001; died 2008) Steve Brown (m. 2013)
- Children: 2
- Musical career
- Genres: R&B; neo soul
- Instruments: Vocals; guitar; piano; percussion; bass
- Labels: EMI; Capitol; Virgin
- Website: corinnebaileyrae.com

Corinne Jacqueline Bailey Rae (/kəˈrɪn/; née Bailey; born 26 February 1979) is a British singer and songwriter. She is best known for her 2006 single "Put Your Records On". Bailey Rae was named the number-one predicted breakthrough act of 2006 in an annual BBC poll of music critics, Sound of 2006. She released her debut album, Corinne Bailey Rae, in February 2006, and became the fourth female British act in history to have her first album debut at number one. The album has sold over four million copies. In 2007, Bailey Rae was nominated for three Grammy Awards and three Brit Awards, and won two MOBO Awards. In 2008, she won a Grammy Award for Album of the Year (for her work as a featured artist in Herbie Hancock's River: The Joni Letters).

Bailey Rae released her second album, The Sea, on 26 January 2010, after a hiatus of almost three years. It was produced by Steve Brown and Steve Chrisanthou (who produced her debut album in 2006). She was nominated for the 2010 Mercury Prize for Album of the Year. In 2012, she won a Grammy Award for Best R&B Performance for "Is This Love" (a cover of the Bob Marley and the Wailers song of the same name). Bailey Rae was married to fellow musician Jason Rae from 2001 until his death from an accidental overdose of methadone and alcohol in 2008; she channelled the grief of his loss into her music.

On 26 February 2016, Bailey Rae announced her third album, The Heart Speaks in Whispers, which was released on 13 May 2016. The Heart Speaks in Whispers debuted at No. 2 on Billboard's R&B chart.

== Early life ==
Bailey Rae was born in Leeds, England. Her father is from Saint Kitts and Nevis and her mother is English, although they separated when she was a child. She is the eldest of three daughters. Her siblings include actress Rhea Bailey. She attended Allerton High School in north Leeds.

Bailey Rae began her musical career at school, where she studied classical violin before turning her attention to singing. Some of her earliest vocal performance experiences took place at a Plymouth Brethren church. Bailey Rae later transferred to a Baptist church, where the youth leader also coached rock bands in the local high school. The church's young people wrote their own worship songs and sang covers of songs by Primal Scream. She recorded two albums with the worship ministry youth group, under the name "Revive." Performing in church broadened Bailey Rae's musical horizons, and her love for making music was solidified after the church youth leader offered to lend her the money to buy her first guitar. In her mid-teens, she was influenced by Lenny Kravitz, also exploring rock through listening to Jimi Hendrix and Led Zeppelin.

Bailey Rae studied English language and literature at the University of Leeds, graduating in 2000.

== Music career ==
=== 1998–2003: Beginnings ===
Bailey Rae formed an indie group called Helen, which was inspired by acts such as Veruca Salt and L7. "It was the first time I'd seen women with guitars. They were kinda sexy—but feminist. I wanted to be like that, at the front of something." The group played gigs around Leeds, sharing some venues with the early incarnation of the Kaiser Chiefs. Helen were eventually approached by Roadrunner Records—a label better known for extreme metal acts such as Slipknot—who intended to make them their first indie signing. The deal collapsed before it was signed, however, after the bassist became pregnant, and the group disbanded. Bailey Rae later said she was "gutted" by the breakup and "had no idea what to do next".

In the years that followed, Bailey Rae moved away from her indie past toward a more "soulful" sound. She collaborated with the Leeds-based funk group the New Mastersounds on the track "Your Love Is Mine", which featured on their 2003 album Be Yourself, released by One Note Records. The following year she worked with another Leeds act, Homecut Directive, on the song "Come the Revolution".

=== 2004–2008: Corinne Bailey Rae ===
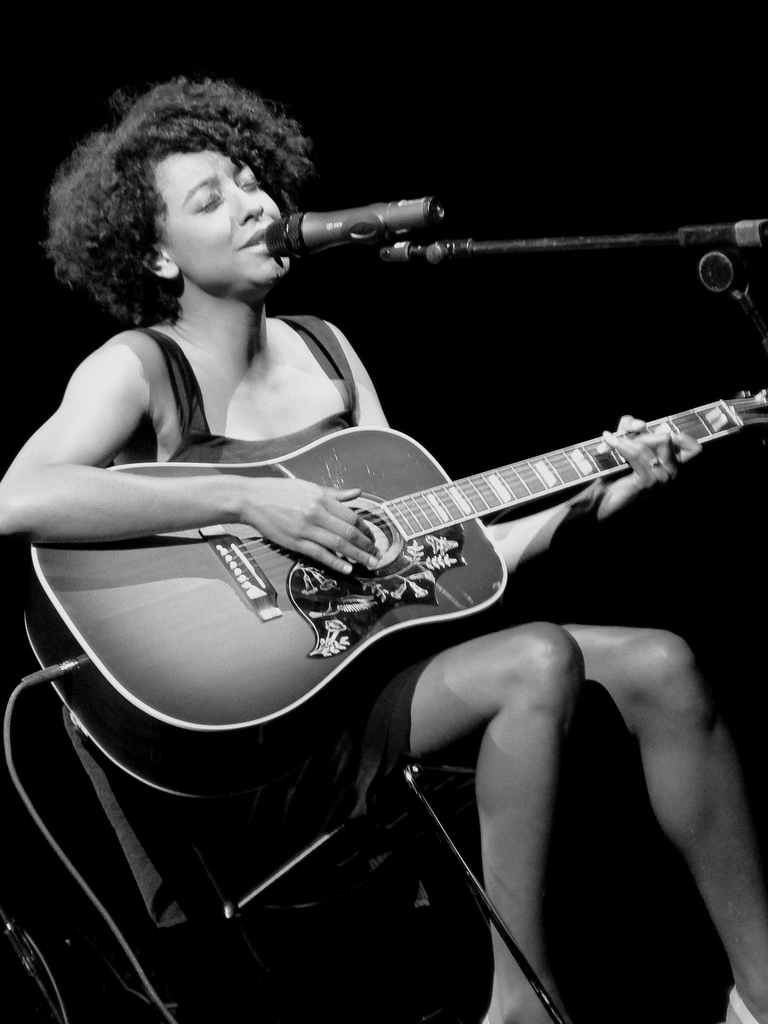
Bailey Rae performing live at the V Festival in August 2007

In 2004, Bailey Rae got a breakthrough when she was signed by Global Talent Publishing and then approached by Craig David's mentor Mark Hill, from the duo the Artful Dodger, to appear on his new album better luck next time under his new alias, the stiX. The resulting collaboration, "Young and Foolish", was released in April 2005 and brought Bailey Rae to the attention of the major record label bosses.

Bailey Rae released her debut single, "Like a Star", in November 2005 and her first album, Corinne Bailey Rae, in February 2006. It debuted at number one in the UK and entered the top ten of the U.S. Billboard 200, peaking at number four and spending 71 weeks in the chart from 2006 to 2008. According to Nielsen SoundScan, the album sold 1.9 million copies in the United States alone.

The lead single, "Like a Star", became a hit in the UK and US, and sold more than 327,000 US downloads. The follow-up single, "Put Your Records On", her biggest hit to date, rose to number two in the UK, and sold more than 945,000 US downloads. "Trouble Sleeping" made the top 40, and "I'd Like To", the top seventy. In the middle of 2006, Bailey Rae embarked on her first international tour through Europe and North America with R&B singer John Legend, playing 55 shows including the festivals Rock in Rio Lisboa 2 and Live Earth. In early April 2006, Corinne Bailey Rae was certified 2× platinum by the BPI and platinum by the RIAA in December. In September 2006, Bailey Rae scooped two awards at the UK's MOBO Awards: "Best UK Newcomer" and "Best UK Female". Bailey Rae recorded a live session at Abbey Road Studios in July 2006 for Live from Abbey Road.

Bailey Rae was the musical guest in a 2006 episode of Saturday Night Live with the host being Jaime Pressly. She performed "Put Your Records On" and "Like a Star". She also appeared on Studio 60 on the Sunset Strip on the episode "B-12", which aired in November 2006, with Howie Mandel. She performed "Like a Star" and "Trouble Sleeping". Also in 2006, Bailey Rae performed on BBC Radio 1 Live Lounge with the songs "Like a Star", a cover version of Editors' "Munich", and a cover version of Justin Timberlake's "SexyBack".

Bailey Rae also received three nominations at the 2007 Grammy Awards: Record of the Year, Song of the Year (both for "Put Your Records On"), and Best New Artist. During the ceremony, she performed "Like a Star" and joined John Legend and John Mayer in a collaborative performance, providing accompanying vocals to Legend's "Coming Home" and Mayer's "Gravity".

Also in 2007, Bailey Rae accepted an invitation to participate in Goin' Home: A Tribute to Fats Domino (Vanguard Records), where she contributed her version of Domino's "One Night (of Sin)". She also recorded John Lennon's "I'm Losing You" for Make Some Noise, Amnesty International's music venture. The song was also released on the 2007 John Lennon tribute album, Instant Karma: The Amnesty International Campaign to Save Darfur. In July of that year, Bailey Rae performed at the UK leg of Live Earth at Wembley Stadium, London.

In 2008, "Like a Star" was nominated for a Grammy for Song of the Year. Bailey Rae won in two categories for Album of the Year and Best Contemporary Jazz Album for her collaboration on River: The Joni Letters. Also in 2008, she recorded a live session of "River" with Hancock at Abbey Road Studios in for Live from Abbey Road for Channel 4, which was broadcast on Series 2.

During the American and European tour, Bailey Rae recorded her first DVD with the title Live in London & New York. The DVD was filmed in London and the bonus CD was recorded in New York.

=== 2009–2011: The Sea and The Love EP ===
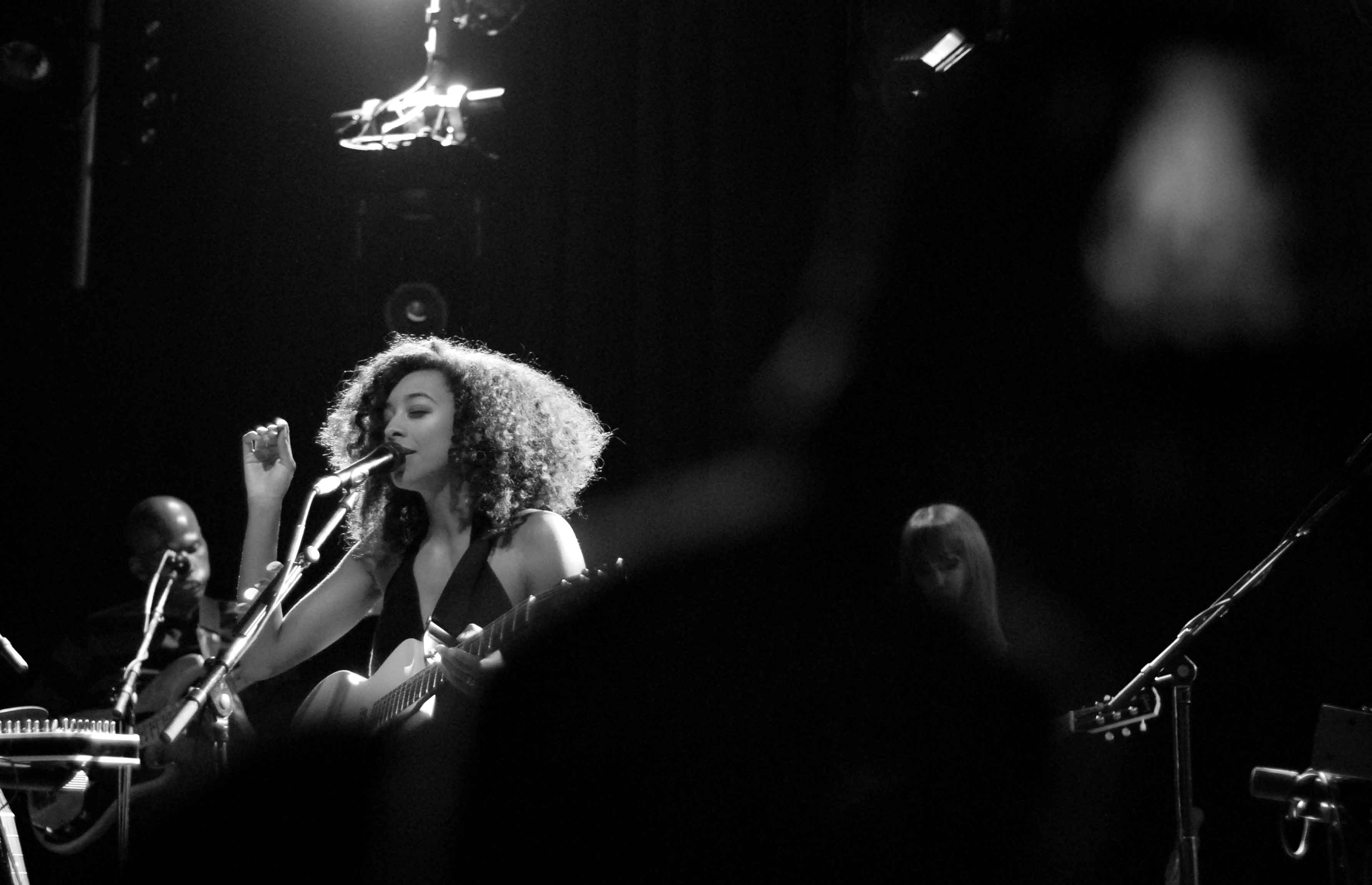
Bailey Rae performing at Le Divan du Monde, 2010

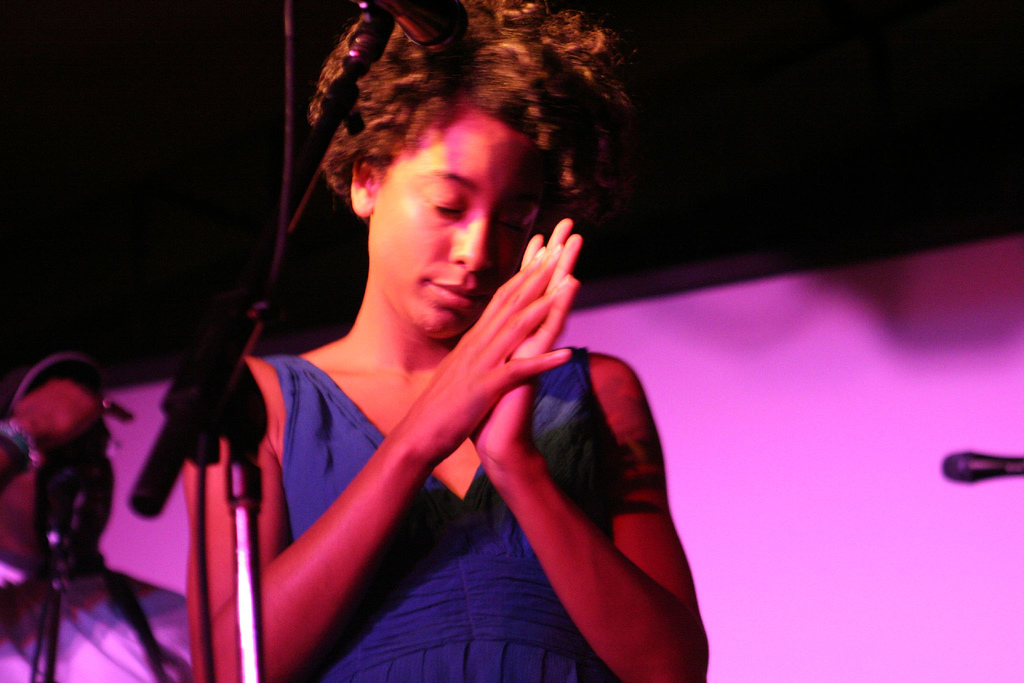
Bailey Rae performing live in 2006

Corinne Bailey Rae released her new album, entitled The Sea, on 26 January 2010, four years after the release of her first album and almost two years after the death of her husband, Jason Rae. The lead single "I'd Do It All Again" premiered on 25 November 2009 on Later... with Jools Holland. The follow-up single, ‘Closer’, was added to Smooth Jazz Radio on 25 January, Urban AC on 1 February and AC radio in late February. The album's second single, ‘Paris Nights and New York Mornings’, went to Triple-A radio on 15 February. Around the release of the second album Bailey Rae did a run of promotional shows in the UK, Europe and US and embarked on her second world tour, The Sea Tour, with 82 concerts and a gross profit of US$19 million. The tour visited the UK, Europe, the US (Spring and Summer), Brazil, Argentina, Japan, Korea, Singapore and the Middle East. The tour began on 27 February 2010 in London and her last show was on 10 March 2011 in Korea. Her summer concert in London at Somerset House sold out, and she returned to London in October to perform at the Royal Festival Hall with Pete Lawrie as a supporting act.

In December 2009, Bailey Rae recorded a live performance in New York City, which was broadcast in the summer of 2010 on the US television program Live From the Artists Den.

On 2 June 2010, Bailey Rae appeared with Herbie Hancock, singing "Blackbird" in a concert honouring Paul McCartney in the East Room of the White House.

On 25 January 2011, Bailey Rae released an EP, The Love EP, with five recordings of love songs, including Prince's "I Wanna Be Your Lover", Bob Marley's "Is This Love" and Paul McCartney & Wings' "My Love". The EP debuted at number 86 on the Billboard 200 and still managed the Top 20 in Top R&B/Hip-Hop Albums. The EP has sold 15,000 copies in the U.S. The first single, "Is This Love", won Best R&B Performance at 54th Grammy Awards.

Bailey Rae was a musical guest on The Tonight Show with Jay Leno on 28 October 2010, covering the Bob Marley song "Is This Love".

On 14 July 2011, she was awarded an honorary doctorate by the University of Leeds, where she had studied as an undergraduate.

During an interview for the 2011 Mercury Awards Bailey Rae revealed she was writing a follow-up album to her critically acclaimed The Sea. She has uploaded many photos of herself in various studios recording music for the new album to her social media accounts.

In 2013, Bailey Rae was moved from Capitol Records to Virgin Records owing to corporate restructuring as a result of their parent company being purchased by Universal Music Group in 2012.

=== 2016–2019: The Heart Speaks in Whispers, "The Scientist" (Fifty Shades Darker), SummerStage and tour ===
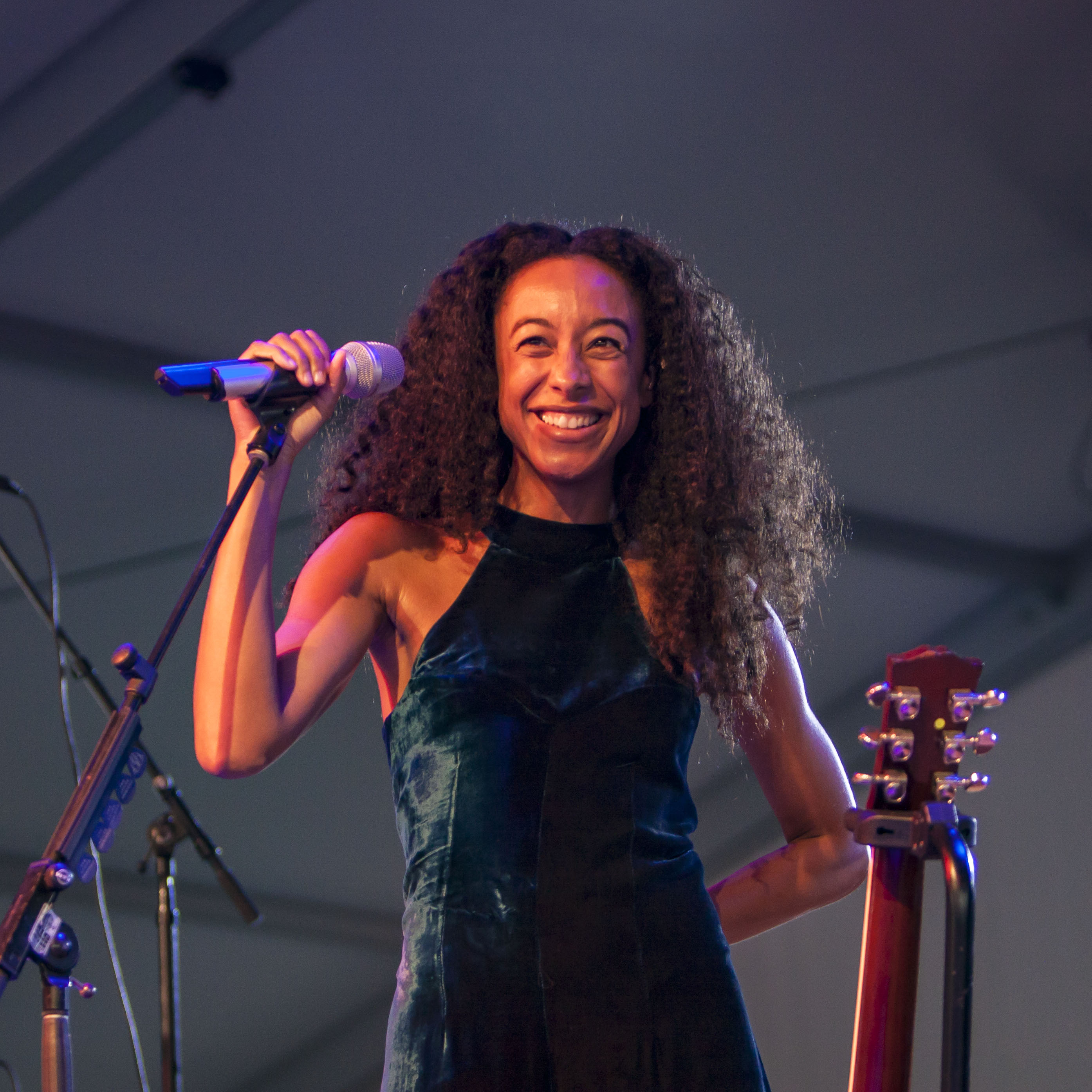
Bailey Rae in 2016

On 14 February 2016, Bailey Rae presented her comeback into music by sharing a snippet of her new single. On 26 February, Bailey Rae announced the title of her third album, The Heart Speaks in Whispers, which was released on 13 May 2016. The lead single off the album, "Been to the Moon", was also released.

The Heart Speaks in Whispers debuted No. 2 on Billboard's R&B chart. Featuring "Been to the Moon", "The Skies Will Break" and "Green Aphrodisiac", NPR named it one of their favourite 30 albums of the year.

Recorded both at her studio in Leeds and in Los Angeles at Capitol Studios, the album was co-produced by Bailey Rae with Steve Brown, who collaborated on her critically acclaimed 2010 album The Sea, and features Paris and Amber Strother (KING), Esperanza Spalding, James Gadson, Bill Withers, Pino Palladino (D'Angelo and The Vanguard), and Marcus Miller (Miles Davis, Herbie Hancock, Luther Vandross).

Bailey Rae was selected by NASA for the "Destination: Jupiter" campaign when the spacecraft Juno entered Jupiter's orbit on 5 July 2016; represented Europe for the International Olympic Committee's PSA Campaign; performed at various festivals in the UK and Europe, including Glastonbury; and was special guest supporting Stevie Wonder at his Hyde Park, London concert. President Barack Obama featured "Green Aphrodisiac" on his Spotify Summer "Night" Playlist.

On 17 November 2016, Bailey Rae joined other artists in tributes to Smokey Robinson at his 2016 Library of Congress Gershwin Prize award ceremony in Washington D.C.; she sang "Ooo Baby Baby".

In 2017, Corinne Bailey Rae recorded "The Scientist" (originally recorded by Coldplay) for the opening title sequence for Universal Pictures' Fifty Shades Darker which opened 10 February. The track is featured on the Fifty Shades Darker Soundtrack, which released the same day.

In 2019, Bailey Rae was scheduled to perform on the main Center Park space at Capital One City Parks Foundation SummerStage festival in Central Park in June, along with Emily King, Big Freedia and other artists. She toured the UK, Europe and US during the same year, beginning from 2 June to 18 November.

Bailey Rae was invited to contribute a selection to a Tom Waits tribute album that was released in late 2019, Come On Up to the House: Women Sing Waits. She chose to record "Jersey Girl", which is also associated with Bruce Springsteen who covered the song in 1984.

=== 2023–present: Black Rainbows ===
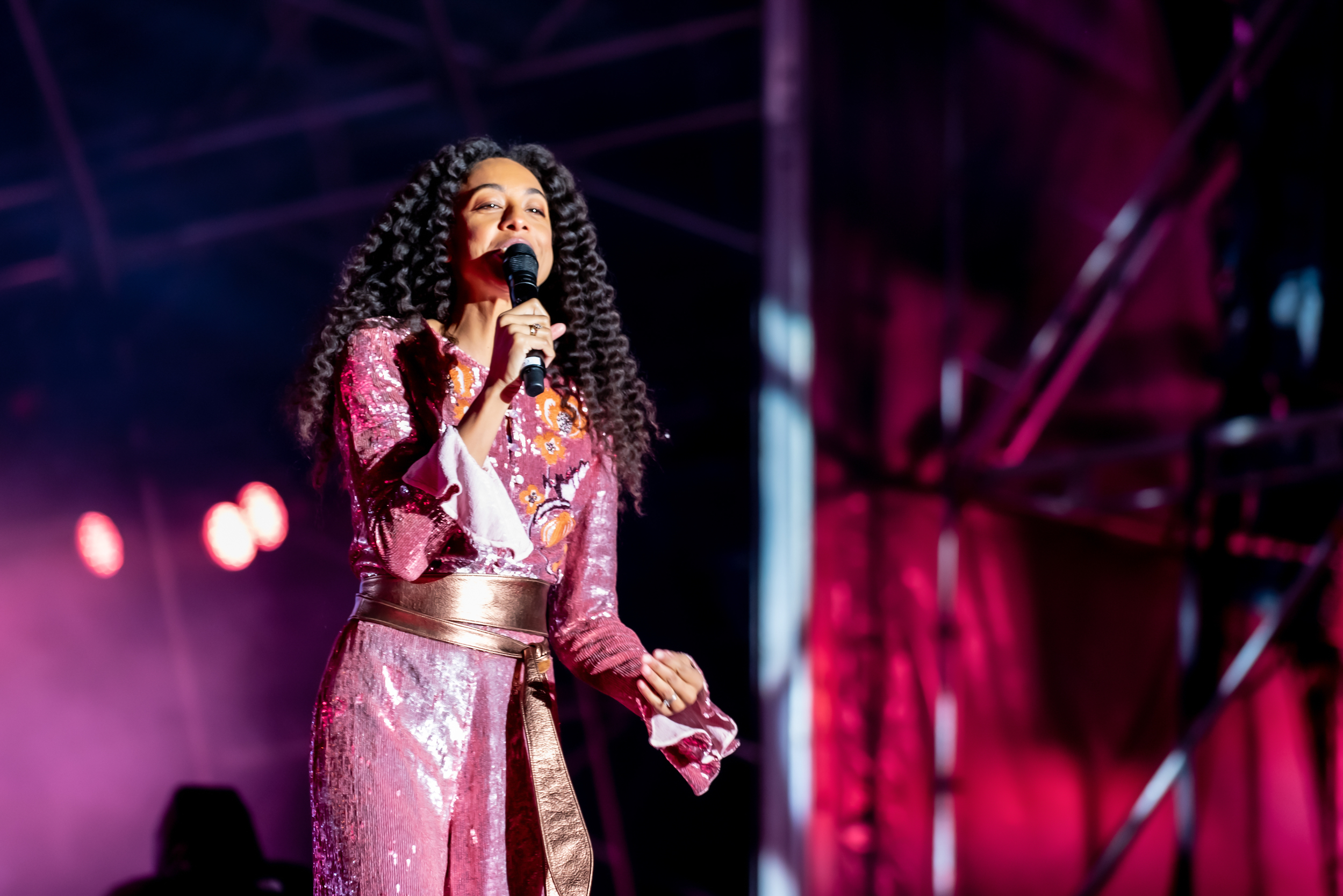
Corinne Bailey Rae on stage at The Awakening, LEEDS 2023

Bailey Rae performed at the opening of LEEDS 2023 - a year of culture organised by the city - on 7 January 2023.

On 19 June 2023, Bailey Rae announced Black Rainbows, her first album in seven years. The album was inspired by her experiences with the Stony Island Arts Bank, a Chicago-based archive of Black art and culture curated by artist and professor Theaster Gates. The album was released on 15 September 2023.

== Other ventures ==
"Like a Star" is part of the soundtracks of several films, series and soap operas, such as Dynasty, Cashmere Mafia, 27 Dresses, Men in Trees, Nancy Drew, Perfect Stranger, Medium, Studio 60 on the Sunset Strip, Venus, Grey's Anatomy, Criminal Minds and Sete Pecados. "Put Your Records On" appears in the 6th episode of the series By Any Means.

In the film Venus, six songs from the debut album were included on the soundtrack of the film, which are "I'd Like To", "Another Rainy Day", "Choux Pastry Heart", "Put Your Records On", "Like a Star", and "Breathless".

The song "I'd Like To", from Bailey Rae's debut album, was also featured in the soundtrack for the movie He's Just Not That Into You (2009). It can also be heard on an episode of CSI:NY. Her song "Lucky One" is the title theme for Stan Lee's Lucky Man, a 2016 production for Sky 1 television in the U.K.

Bailey Rae is the special ambassador for the charity Cord. She is also the central ambassador for the international water and sanitation charity Pump Aid. In September 2012, she was featured in a campaign called "30 Songs/30 Days" to support Half the Sky: Turning Oppression into Opportunity for Women Worldwide, a multi-platform media project inspired by Nicholas Kristof and Sheryl WuDunn's book.

== Personal life ==
While at university, she worked in the evening as a cloakroom attendant at her local jazz club, where she met Scotsman Jason Rae. When she married Rae in 2001 at the age of 22 she changed her name to Bailey Rae. Jason Rae (1976–2008), a musician, played saxophone for the eight-piece group called Haggis Horns. He also recorded on albums with his wife, and with Amy Winehouse, the New Mastersounds, and Martina Topley-Bird (Quixotic).

On 22 March 2008, Jason Rae was found dead in a flat in the Hyde Park area of Leeds. In December 2008, Leeds Coroner's Court gave a verdict of death by misadventure and stated that Rae had died of an accidental overdose of methadone and alcohol. The methadone had been prescribed to a friend who was recovering from an addiction to heroin. Bailey Rae said the experience was the closest she had come to death herself, because "it was challenging to keep in life at the time."

In 2013, Bailey Rae married her longtime friend, producer and jazz musician Steve Brown. The couple have two daughters, and live in Leeds.

== Discography ==
- Corinne Bailey Rae (2006)
- The Sea (2010)
- The Heart Speaks in Whispers (2016)
- Black Rainbows (2023)

== Filmography ==
List of television credits
Year	Title	Role	Notes
2006	Saturday Night Live	Herself / Musical Guest	"Jaime Pressly/Corinne Bailey Rae" (Season 32, Episode 2)
2006	Studio 60 on the Sunset Strip	Herself	"B-12" (Season 1, Episode 10, uncredited)
2006	Austin City Limits	Herself / Musical Guest	"Corinne Bailey Rae / KT Tunstall" (Season 32 Episode 8)
2011	Project Runway	Herself/Audience	"Finale Part Two" (Season 9, Episode 14)

== Awards, honors, and nominations ==
=== Grammy Awards ===
The Grammy Awards are awarded annually by the National Academy of Recording Arts and Sciences. Bailey Rae has won two awards from six nominations. She won Album of the Year as a featured artist on Herbie Hancock's 2007 River: The Joni Letters.

Year	Nominee / work	Award	Result
2007	Corinne Bailey Rae	Best New Artist	Nominated
2007	"Put Your Records On"	Record of the Year	Nominated
2007	"Put Your Records On"	Song of the Year	Nominated
2008	"Like a Star"	Song of the Year	Nominated
2008	River: The Joni Letters (featured artist)	Album of the Year	Won
2012	"Is This Love"	Best R&B Performance	Won

=== Other awards, honors and nominations ===
Year	Result	Award	Category	Nominated Work
2006	Nominated	BET Awards	BET J Cool Like Dat Award	General
2006	Nominated	MTV Europe Music Awards	Best UK & Ireland Act	General
2006	Nominated	MTV Woodie Awards	International Woodie (Favorite International Artist)	General
2006	Nominated	UK Festival Music Awards	Best Urban Act	General
2006	Nominated	Premios 40 Principales	Mejor Artista Nuevo Internacional	General
2006	Nominated	MOBO Awards	Best Song	"Put Your Records On"
2006	Won	MOBO Awards	Best UK Female	General
2006	Won	MOBO Awards	Best UK Newcomer	General
2006	Won	MOJO Awards	Best New Act	General
2006	Won	Q Awards	Best New Act	General
2006	Won	Sound of...	Sound of 2006	General
2007	Nominated	BET Awards	Best New Artist	General
2007	Nominated	BET Awards	Best Female R&B Artist	General
2007	Nominated	BRIT Award	Best British Single	"Put Your Records On"
2007	Nominated	BRIT Award	British Female Artist	General
2007	Nominated	BRIT Award	British Breakthrough Act	General
2007	Nominated	Teen Choice Awards	Best Female Breakthrough Artist	General
2007	Nominated	ECHO Awards	International Newcomer of the Year	General
2007	Nominated	Ivor Novello Awards	PRS Most Performed Work	General
2007	Nominated	MOBO Awards	Best UK Female	General
2007	Nominated	NAACP Image Awards	Outstanding Album	Corinne Bailey Rae
2007	Nominated	NAACP Image Awards	Outstanding Female Artist	General
2007	Won	NAACP Image Awards	Outstanding New Artist	General
2007	Won	Music Week Awards	International Marketing Campaign of the Year	General
2007	Won	European Border Breakers Awards (EBBA)	United Kingdom	General
2007	Nominated	Kickers Urban Music Award	Best Neo Soul Act	Corinne Bailey Rae
2007	Nominated	Kickers Urban Music Award	Best Crossover Chart Act	General
2007	Nominated	Urban Music Awards	Best Neo Soul Act	General
2007	Won	BMI Pop Awards	Song of the Year	"Put Your Records On"
2010	Nominated	Mercury Prize	Album of the Year	The Sea
2010	Nominated	Q Awards	Best Female Act	Corinne Bailey Rae
2010	Nominated	MOBO Awards	Best UK R&B Soul Act Act	Corinne Bailey Rae
2010	Nominated	American Smooth Jazz Awards	Best Female Act	Corinne Bailey Rae
2010	Nominated	BET Awards	Best International Act	Corinne Bailey Rae
2010	Nominated	Soul Train Music Awards	Centric Award	Corinne Bailey Rae
2024	Nominated	Mercury Prize	Album of the Year	Black Rainbows

Bailey Rae's name is one of those featured on the sculpture Ribbons, unveiled in 2024.
