= The Sea (Corinne Bailey Rae album) =

Studio album by Corinne Bailey Rae
- Released: 20 January 2010
- Recorded: 2009
- Studios: 600 Feet (London); Denzel Oscar (Leeds); Glenwood Place (Burbank); Limefield; St. Margaret's Church (Manchester); Warren House Farm (Scarborough)
- Genres: Soul; R&B; pop rock
- Length: 42:50
- Label: Virgin
- Producers: Ahmir 'Questlove' Thompson; Corinne Baily Rae; James Poyser; Steve Brown; Steve Chrisanthou

Corinne Bailey Rae chronology
Live in London & New York (2007)	The Sea (2010)	The Love EP (2011)

Singles from The Sea
- 1. "I'd Do It All Again" Released: 12 January 2010; 2. "Paris Nights/New York Mornings" Released: 29 March 2010; 3. "Closer" Released: 2 August 2010

The Sea is the second studio album by English singer-songwriter Corinne Bailey Rae. It was released on 20 January 2010 by Virgin Records.

The album was conceived following Bailey Rae's hiatus from music, taken in the wake of her husband Jason Rae's death. She recorded The Sea at Limefield Studio in Manchester, England, during 2009, working mostly with a host of session musicians and the record producers Steve Brown and Steve Chrisanthou. It features songs written by Bailey Rae before and after her husband's death, touching on themes of love, lament and solace.

The Sea debuted at number five on the UK Albums Chart and was certified gold by the British Phonographic Industry (BPI). It also charted at number seven on the Billboard 200 in the United States, where it had sold 156,000 copies by April 2010. A critical success, The Sea received mostly positive reviews and was nominated for the 2010 Mercury Prize. Bailey Rae supported the album with a concert tour in early 2010.

== Writing and recording ==
Following the multi-platinum and award-winning success of her eponymous debut album in 2006, Bailey Rae began to work on songs for a follow-up album in late 2007. However, she took a hiatus from music, following the death of her husband, Scottish saxophonist Jason Rae, in March 2008 to an accidental overdose of methadone and alcohol. For a long period of time, Bailey Rae said, "I didn't really hear any songs. Normally in my everyday life, I'd be in the car and come up with a little line, or I'd look at something and try to describe it ... I didn't really think in that way anymore. Nothing was coming in." After months of grief and isolation, Bailey Rae revisited her work the following year and composed additional material for The Sea.

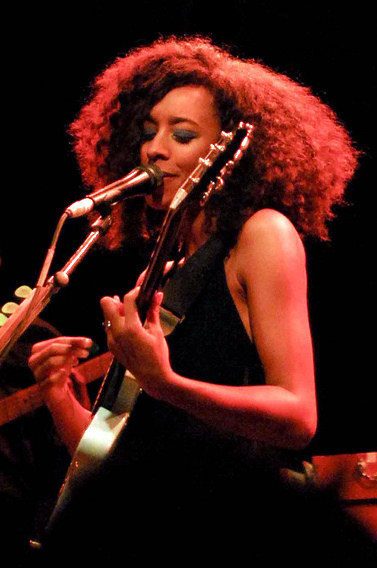
Bailey Rae performing in January 2010

The Sea contains songs written before and after the death of Bailey Rae's husband, all of which she said resonated with her: "The circumstances have cast it all in a different light. It began as a 'before and after' record, but it's become an 'after' record." The ballad "I'd Do It All Again" was written by Bailey Rae in January 2008 after an argument with her husband. She told NME that writing the rest of the album helped her handle the different emotions she felt after her husband's death: "When I started writing that I was thinking, 'I don't really want this song to go into the world, 'cause it's so naked...' But I had to." "I Would Like to Call it Beauty", she said, was written about finding beauty in the "darkest times", later telling journalist Sean O'Hagan:

There is something miraculous that pushes you along, makes you keep going, makes you carry on. It's really about the mystery of that. In fact, the whole album is about that in a way; it's about loss but it's also about hope, about keeping going and trying to find that beauty.

Bailey Rae recorded most of The Sea in 2009 at Manchester's Limefield Studio. She co-produced the record mostly with Steve Brown and Steve Chrisanthou, both of whom had worked on her debut album. Bailey Rae pursued a sound more aggressive than on her debut. During the recording process, Bailey Rae listened to Sly and the Family Stone's 1973 album Fresh and Curtis Mayfield's 1975 album There's No Place Like America Today, as well as the music of Nina Simone and Leonard Cohen. A live band was used in the album's recording, which was also a departure from her debut. "On the first album, it was me and a producer in a basement going through hundreds of snare drum sounds to find the right one," she recalled. "With a live band, you can stretch out more and try new things out without feeling you're having to undo this meticulously built-up track."

The album was titled after the recurring theme of water in songs such as "Diving for Hearts" and "I Would Like to Call It Beauty", while the music was said by Bailey Rae to possess "a kind of tidal movement to it too, in the way that we recorded the songs. You know, sometimes it would just be me and my guitar. Then we'd really sort of swell up into these big arrangements, only to then retreat back to it just being me and my guitar again." According to Chris Mugan from The Independent, The Sea was a departure from the polished sound of Bailey Rae's debut album, while Paste magazine's Steve Labate said Bailey Rae expanded on her debut's mix of contemporary R&B and older soul music by incorporating pop rock, singer-songwriter influences, and occasional elements of bossa nova and trip hop. In the opinion of Craig McLean from The Daily Telegraph, the record's music evoked Simone's singing and the 1968 Van Morrison album Astral Weeks.

== Marketing and sales ==
Before releasing The Sea, Bailey Rae showcased songs from the album on a preview concert tour in late 2009, playing venues in England, Canada, Los Angeles, and New York. She premiered the songs during a 23 November 2009 performance at The Tabernacle in London, her first complete gig since her hiatus from the music scene. She also showcased its songs on 7 December at New York City's Hiro Ballroom, which was recorded for the public television series Live from the Artists Den. Bailey Rae also promoted the album with guest performances on the talk shows Today and Later... with Jools Holland. Three singles were released from the album: "I'd Do It All Again" on 12 January 2010, "Paris Nights/New York Mornings" on 29 March, and "Closer" on 2 August. Bailey Rae's record label EMI sent the singles to music video/radio stations of multiple formats, including urban adult contemporary, smooth jazz and adult album alternative.

The Sea debuted at number five on the UK Albums Chart, selling 22,914 copies in its first week. The album was certified gold by the British Phonographic Industry (BPI) on 14 May 2010, and as of May 2016, it had sold 104,331 copies in the United Kingdom. In the United States, the album debuted at number seven on the Billboard 200 with 53,000 copies sold in its first week. By April 2010, it had sold 156,000 copies in the US, according to Nielsen SoundScan. On 27 February 2010, Bailey Rae embarked on the European leg of her supporting tour for the album, The Sea Tour, which featured singer-songwriter Daniel Merriweather as her opening act. The tour began its North American leg on 9 April.

== Critical reception ==
Professional ratings
Aggregate scores
Source	Rating
AnyDecentMusic?	7.2/10
Metacritic	78/100
Review scores
Source	Rating
AllMusic	4/5 stars
The Daily Telegraph	4/5 stars
Entertainment Weekly	B+
The Guardian	4/5 stars
The Independent	4/5 stars
Los Angeles Times	4/4 stars
Q	4/5 stars
Rolling Stone	3.5/5 stars
Spin	3/5 stars
The Times	3/5 stars

The Sea was met with generally positive reviews. At Metacritic, which assigns a normalised rating out of 100 to reviews from professional critics, the album received an average score of 78, based on 21 reviews.

Reviewing the album in The Observer, Kitty Empire said it is "saturated in feeling and graced by superior musicianship". AllMusic's David Jeffries called it "a testament to Rae's artistic growth", while Steve Leftridge of PopMatters found the album "richer" than her debut, with a "darker and more sophisticated sonic palette". Q credited Bailey Rae for making The Sea never sound "exploitative or mawkish, just truthful and real". In the Los Angeles Times, Powers deemed the album a "remarkable accomplishment" and "a step toward something—Rae's inner peace, and her next artistic breakthrough—that has its own considerable rewards".

Some reviewers expressed reservations. The Observer's Graeme Thompson felt the album's strong points offer "glimpses of a new horizon shining beyond the riptides of pain and sorrow", but at times it sounds "dull and flat". Slant Magazine's Nick Day was more critical, finding the music forgettable and the lyrics introspective but vague. Hot Press journalist Patrick Freyne believed the music exhibits an "excessive tastefulness" while panning the contributions of the session musicians, whom he said were "technically proficient" but sounded soulless.

In late 2010, The Sea was named the year's best album by The Guardian's Caroline Sullivan, while Powers ranked it ninth on her year-end list of 2010's best albums. Q and Uncut included the album on their respective year-end lists at numbers 22 and 37. It was also nominated for the 2010 Mercury Prize, awarded annually for the best record from the UK or Ireland; Bailey Rae lost out to The xx's self-titled debut album.

== Track listing ==
No.	Title	Writer(s)	Producer(s)	Length
1.	"Are You Here"	Corinne Bailey Rae	Bailey Rae; Steve Brown	4:13
2.	"I'd Do It All Again"	Bailey Rae	Bailey Rae; Brown	3:08
3.	"Feels Like the First Time"	Bailey Rae; Brown	Bailey Rae; Brown	3:13
4.	"The Blackest Lily"	Bailey Rae	Bailey Rae; James Poyser; Ahmir 'Questlove' Thompson; Brown	3:38
5.	"Closer"	Bailey Rae	Bailey Rae; Brown	4:17
6.	"Love's On Its Way"	Bailey Rae	Bailey Rae; Brown	3:55
7.	"I Would Like to Call It Beauty"	Bailey Rae; Philip Rae	Bailey Rae; Brown	4:19
8.	"Paris Nights/New York Mornings"	Bailey Rae	Bailey Rae; Steve Chrisanthou	3:51
9.	"Paper Dolls"	Bailey Rae	Bailey Rae; Chrisanthou; Brown^{[a]}	3:20
10.	"Diving for Hearts"	Bailey Rae; Jennifer Birch	Bailey Rae; Chrisanthou	4:51
11.	"The Sea"	Bailey Rae	Bailey Rae; Chrisanthou	4:05
Total length:				42:50

Japanese edition bonus tracks
No.	Title	Writer(s)	Producer(s)	Length
12.	"Little Wing"	Jimi Hendrix	Bailey Rae; Brown	4:07
13.	"It Be's That Way Sometime"	Samuel Waymon	Bailey Rae; Brown	3:28
Total length:				50:15

Japanese special edition bonus EP: The Love EP
No.	Title	Writer(s)	Producer(s)	Length
1.	"I Wanna Be Your Lover"	Prince Rogers Nelson	Brown; Bailey Rae	3:30
2.	"Low Red Moon"	Tanya Donelly	Brown; Bailey Rae	5:01
3.	"Is This Love"	Bob Marley	Brown; Bailey Rae	3:29
4.	"My Love"	Paul McCartney; Linda McCartney	Brown; Bailey Rae	3:17
5.	"Que Sera Sera" (live)	Ray Evans; Jay Livingston		13:27
Total length:				28:44

Notes

- ^{^[a]} signifies an additional producer

== Personnel ==
Credits adapted from the liner notes of The Sea.

- Corinne Bailey Rae – vocals, backing vocals, production (all tracks); piano (track 1); percussion (tracks 1, 4, 9, 10); electric guitar (tracks 1, 6, 8, 9); acoustic guitar (tracks 2, 7, 8); Spanish guitar (track 3); glass organ (track 6); autoharp (tracks 6, 11); glockenspiel (tracks 8, 10); Stylophone (track 9); choral arrangement, guitar (track 10)
- Freddie August – first violin (tracks 2, 8, 11)
- Mike Baker – assistant engineering (tracks 1, 7)
- Katherine Barnecutt – viola (tracks 5, 6)
- Lucie Barnicoat – violin (tracks 2, 3, 8, 11)
- Garrath Beckwith – bass trombone (track 3)
- Sally Bell – viola (track 3)
- Sam Bell – congas (track 3)
- Nia Bevan – string contracting (tracks 2, 8, 11); first violin, string contracting, trombone contracting (track 3)
- Ruth Bingham – cello (tracks 2, 8, 11)
- Bob Birch – piano (track 10)
- Jennifer Birch – backing vocals (tracks 1–3, 6, 7, 9); choir (track 10)
- Adam Blackstone – bass (track 4)
- Ian Bone – violin (tracks 2, 3, 8, 11)
- Steve Brown – horn arrangements, string arrangements (all tracks); production (tracks 1–7); backing vocals (tracks 1–4, 6, 7, 11); glockenspiel, Sharma guitar (track 1); horn recording (tracks 1, 2, 11); recording (tracks 1, 3–7); bass (tracks 1, 11); assistant engineering (track 2); organ (tracks 2, 7–9); string recording (tracks 2, 8, 11); acoustic piano (track 3); synthesiser (tracks 3–6, 8, 10); electric piano (tracks 3, 7, 9); percussion (track 4); piano (tracks 4, 5, 9); additional bass (tracks 4, 9); Rhodes (tracks 5, 8, 10); Clavinet (tracks 5, 9); piano frame (track 6); synth bass (tracks 6, 7); flute arrangements (track 7); additional production, Stylophone nonet (track 9); additional recording (tracks 9, 11); Hammond organ (track 10); harmonium (track 11)
- Steve "Billy" Buckley – bass, guitar (track 9)
- Nick Burns – cello (track 3)
- John Burr – harmonica (track 7)
- Steve Chrisanthou – recording (tracks 8–10); production (tracks 8–11); additional recording (track 11)
- Ben Cotterell – horn recording (tracks 1, 2, 11); string recording (tracks 2, 8, 11)
- Alex Cowper – artwork, design
- David Coyle – horn recording (tracks 1, 2, 11); string recording (tracks 2, 8, 11)
- Jane Coyle – viola (tracks 2, 3, 8, 11)
- Simon Denton – solo cello (track 2); cello (tracks 2, 8, 11)
- Barnaby Dickinson – trombone (track 5)
- Liam Duffy – French horn (tracks 1, 2, 8, 11)
- Julie Edwards – violin (tracks 2, 8, 11)
- John Ellis – bass (track 2); piano (track 11)
- Tom Elmhirst – mixing
- Paul Farr – electric guitar (tracks 2, 6)
- Ella Feingold – electric guitar (track 4)
- Luke Flowers – drums (tracks 1–3, 6, 7, 9, 10)
- Tierney Gearon – photography
- Melinda Gourlay – cello (track 3)
- Richard Green – guitar (track 9)
- John Hart – bass trombone (track 3)
- Kenny Higgins – backing vocals (track 1); electric guitar (track 3); bass (tracks 3, 5, 8)
- Carol Jarvis – additional orchestration, horn contracting (tracks 2, 8, 11); string contracting, trombone contracting (track 3)
- Levin Jones – violin (track 3)
- Matthew Kettle – recording (tracks 2, 5, 6, 8–11)
- Leeds University Liturgical Choir – choir (track 10)
- Raymond Lester – viola (tracks 2, 8, 11)
- Gareth Lockrane – flute (tracks 5, 7)
- John McCallum – backing vocals (tracks 1–3, 6, 7, 11); Spanish guitar (track 3); talk box guitar (track 4); guitar (track 5)
- James Pattinson – violin (tracks 2, 5, 6, 8, 11)
- David Pearson – guitar (track 10)
- Kate Pelling – violin (track 3)
- James Poyser – organ, production (track 4)
- Melanie Purves – horn conducting (track 1); conducting, orchestration (tracks 2, 3, 8, 11); string contracting, trombone contracting (track 3)
- Eryl Roberts – drums (track 11)
- Adam Robinson – violin (tracks 2, 3, 8, 11)
- Seb Rochford – drums (track 8)
- Lara Rose – backing vocals (track 11)
- Ray Staff – mastering
- Malcolm Straehan – flugelhorn, trumpet (track 5)
- Ahmir 'Questlove' Thompson – drums, production, tambourine (track 4)
- Andy Thornton – assistant engineering (tracks 8, 10)
- David Tollington – French horn (tracks 1, 2, 11)
- Helen Tonge – violin (tracks 5, 6)
- Bryan White – choral director (track 10)
- Myke Wilson – drums (track 5)
- Semay Wu – cello (tracks 5, 6)

== Charts ==
=== Weekly charts ===
Chart (2010)	Peak position
Australian Hitseekers Albums (ARIA)	7
Belgian Albums (Ultratop Flanders)	43
Belgian Albums (Ultratop Wallonia)	36
Canadian Albums (Billboard)	13
Dutch Albums (Album Top 100)	36
French Albums (SNEP)	78
German Albums (Offizielle Top 100)	70
Greek International Albums (IFPI)	24
Irish Albums (IRMA)	33
Italian Albums (FIMI)	73
Japanese Albums (Oricon)	33
Scottish Albums (Official Charts)	11
Spanish Albums (Promusicae)	48
Swiss Albums (Schweizer Hitparade)	27
UK Albums (Official Charts)	5
US Billboard 200	7
US Top R&B/Hip-Hop Albums (Billboard)	2

=== Year-end charts ===
Chart (2010)	Position
UK Albums (OCC)	146
US Billboard 200	179
US Top R&B/Hip-Hop Albums (Billboard)	38

== Certifications ==
Region	Certification	Certified units/sales
United Kingdom (BPI)	Gold	104,331

== Release history ==
Region	Date	Edition	Label	Ref.
Japan	20 January 2010	Standard	EMI	
Canada	26 January 2010	Standard	EMI	
United States	26 January 2010	Standard	Capitol	
Australia	29 January 2010	Standard	EMI	
Germany	29 January 2010	Standard	EMI	
Ireland	29 January 2010	Standard	Virgin	
Italy	29 January 2010	Standard	EMI	
United Kingdom	1 February 2010	Standard	Virgin	
France	15 February 2010	Standard	EMI	
Japan	8 December 2010	Special	EMI	
