= The Love EP =

The Love EP may refer to:

- The Love EP (Corinne Bailey Rae EP), 2011
- The Love EP (Tristan Prettyman EP), 2003
