= Leon Bolier =

Dutch DJ (born 1980)

- Also known as: Bolier; Inner Stories; LWB; Precursor; Surpresa; Subsphere; WSTLNDR; BLR; Deckers
- Born: Leendert Wouter Bolier; 21 October 1980 (age 45)
- Origin: Elspeet, Nunspeet, Netherlands
- Genres: Trance; progressive trance; tech trance; deep house
- Occupations: DJ; record producer; remixer
- Years active: 2003–present
- Labels: Spinnin'; 2 Play; Black Hole
- Website: www.leonbolier.com

Leendert Wouter "Leon" Bolier (Dutch pronunciation: [ˈleːjɔm boːˈliːr]; born 21 October 1980), also known by his mononym Bolier, is a Dutch trance DJ and record producer.

== Biography ==
Bolier's career began to flourish in 2008 with a number of successful song releases including the hit song "Ocean Drive Boulevard". He placed at #95 on the DJ Mag's 2008 list of the top 100 DJs in the world, and moved up 32 places in 2009, and placed at #68 in 2010. He has had his songs played by top DJs like Tiësto and Armin van Buuren as well as his tracks appearing on famous trance compilations such as In Search of Sunrise 4: Latin America and A State of Trance 2006. Two of his albums were released during the span of 2008 and 2010, titled Pictures and Phantasma, respectively. By the following year, which coincided with his complete dropping out of DJ Mag's list of the top 100 DJs, his musical style began to change, as depicted in "Disco Davai" among others.

At the end of 2014, Bolier started working on his third album under his new alias WSTLNDR. The 12-track work, titled Atmostopia, featured his complete return to his original creative roots which were not seen in his repertoire since the release of Phantasma. The album was released on Black Hole on 14 September 2015.

== Discography ==
=== Albums ===
- 2008: Pictures
- 2010: Phantasma
- 2015: Atmostopia (as WSTLNDR)

=== DJ mixes ===
- 2008: Trance Mission Disc 1
- 2009: Streamlined 2009 - Buenos Aires
- 2010: Streamlined Essentials Vol. 1
- 2011: Streamlined 2011 - Tunis
- 2012: The Retrospective 2006-2011 (unreleased)
- 2026 Back to Life REMIX with Ferry Corsten

=== Releases ===
- 2021: "Can't Stop Now" (with Malarkey)
- 2021: "Trust You" (with Ferry Corsten featuring Nblm)
- 2021: "Floripa" (with Leonardo Da Silva)
- 2021: "Somnium" (with Estuera)
- 2021: "Gamechanger" (with Unomas featuring Penny F.)
- 2020: "Northern Moon" (with Aïka)
- 2020: "Kronos"
- 2020: "Another Blue"
- 2020: "Perpetual"
- 2020: "Lose Control" (with Console featuring Lou)
- 2020: "Gotta Let You Go" (with Alon)
- 2020: "Feel It" (as BLR)
- 2020: "Comfort Me" (as BLR featuring Mvrt)
- 2019: "Ain't No Way Around It" (with Diskover)
- 2018: "Follow Me" (featuring Nblm)
- 2018: "In The Water" (with Trobi)
- 2018: "Grow Up"
- 2018: "One of Them Nights" (featuring Roya)
- 2017: "Discotheque"
- 2017: "Imagine" (with Arem Ozguc and Arman Aydin featuring NBLM)
- 2017: "Untangled" (with Redondo featuring Dana Sipos)
- 2016: "Ipanema"
- 2016: "Is This Love" (with Bob Marley and Lvndscape)
- 2016: "Sweet Love (Calling Out Your Name)"
- 2016: "Riverbank" (with Mingue)
- 2015: "Lost & Found" (with Redondo featuring Bitter's Kiss)
- 2015: "Forever And A Day" (with Natalie Peris)
- 2015: "Ragga" (with Lvndscape)
- 2015: "Theme In C Sharp Minor"
- 2015: "Every Single Piece" (with Redondo featuring She Keeps Bees)
- 2015: "Freak"
- 2014: "Mind Games"
- 2014: "Detonate" (with D-Wayne)
- 2014: "Twisted" (with Daniel Wanrooy)
- 2014: "Project XVI"
- 2013: "Spell"
- 2013: "Disco Davai"
- 2012: "Trumpets" (with Alex Kenji)
- 2012: "Couch Surfin"
- 2012: "Silver" (with Talla 2XLC)
- 2012: "Beach Chords" (with Marcus Schossow)
- 2012: "Us"
- 2012: "Prelude & Kiev"
- 2012: "Me"
- 2012: "You"
- 2012: "Belmont's Revenge" (with Cliff Coenraad)
- 2012: "Bigroom 29"
- 2012: "Placebo" (with Mike Foyle)
- 2012: "Yesterday Eve"
- 2011: "The Peacemaker"
- 2011: "The Lovemaker"
- 2011: "Vengeance Vengeance"
- 2011: "Absolut" (with Joop)
- 2011: "Ost Kaas" (with Marcus Schossow)
- 2011: "Cape Town"
- 2010: "Elysian Fields"
- 2010: "Saturn" (with W&W)
- 2010: "By Your Side (I Will Be There)" (featuring Kathy Fisher)
- 2010: "That Morning"
- 2010: "Dark Star" (with Sied van Riel)
- 2010: "2099" (with Marcus Schossow)
- 2010: "Shimamoto"
- 2009: "NSFW"
- 2009: "Medellin"
- 2009: "Lunar Diamond"
- 2009: "Seraphic"
- 2009: "Last Light Tonight" (with Menno De Jong)
- 2009: "My Precious"
- 2009: "17"
- 2009: "This" (featuring Floria Ambra)
- 2009: "Wet Dream" (with Galen Behr)
- 2009: "Mohawk" (with Cliff Coenraad)
- 2009: "Mighty Ducks" (with Cliff Coenraad)
- 2009: "Crazy People" (with DJ Astrid)
- 2009: "Thug"
- 2009: "Sofa Cure"
- 2008: "YE"
- 2008: "XD"
- 2008: "The Night Is Young"
- 2008: "One / Two"
- 2008: "Ocean Drive Boulevard"
- 2008: "Malibeer / With The Flame In The Pipe"
- 2008: "I Finally Found" (featuring Simon Binkenborn)
- 2008: "Singapore"
- 2008: "Bonaire"
- 2008: "Poseidon"
- 2008: "Hold On" (with Joop and featuring Denise Rivera)
- 2008: "Deep Red"
- 2007: "Summernight Confessions"
- 2006: "No Need To Come Back" (featuring Elsa Hill)
- 2006: "Stargaze"
- 2006: "Momentum" (with Menno De Jong)
- 2006: "Magma" (with Menno De Jong)
- 2006: "Flower Fountain"
- 2006: "Back in the Days"
- 2005: "Beyond"
- 2005: "First Light"
- 2005: "Love You So"
- 2005: "Beautitude"
- 2004: "2nd Season" (with Bart Bolier)
- 2004: "Mea Culpa"
- 2004: "10PM"
- 2004: "Violet" (with Bart Bolier)
- 2004: "Daydreamer" (with Bart Bolier)
- 2004: "Sweet Fragrance" (with Bart Bolier)
- 2004: "Infinite" (with Bart Bolier)
- 2003: "Women's Tears" (with Bart Bolier)
- 2003: "Passionate"

=== Remixes ===
- 2020: Paul Oakenfold and Luis Fonsi - The World Can Wait (Bolier Remix)
- 2020: Gareth Emery - Gunshots (Bolier Remix)
- 2020: Frédér - Desiderio (Bolier Remix)
- 2017: Olav Basoski featuring Spyder - Waterman 2017 (Bolier Remix)
- 2017: Showbiz, Divolly and Markward and Balkan Beat Box - Smatron (Bolier Remix)
- 2017: Lost Frequencies featuring Axel Ehnström - All Or Nothing (Bolier Remix)
- 2016: D-wayne featuring Jack McManus - Love Again (Bolier Remix)
- 2016: Marcus Schossöw and NEW_ID - ADA (Bolier Remix)
- 2016: Jack Eye Jones featuring Paton - Waiting My Whole Life (Bolier Remix)
- 2016: Bob Sinclar - Someone Who Needs Me (Bolier Remix)
- 2016: Wstlndr and Fisher - Save Me (Bolier Remix)
- 2015: Marc Sherry - Vengeance (Bolier pres. WSTLNDR Remix)
- 2013: Rank 1 - Floorlifter (Leon Bolier Remix)
- 2013: Alt-J - Something Good (Leon Bolier Remix)
- 2013: Mark Van Dale with Enrico - Water Verve (Leon Bolier Remix)
- 2012: RMB featuring Talla 2XLC - Spring (Leon Bolier Remix)
- 2011: Raphinha Bartel - Double Evidence (Leon Bolier Remix)
- 2009: Aly & Fila - "Khepera" (Leon Bolier Remix)
- 2009: Cliff Coenraad - "Gone South" (Leon Bolier Remix)
- 2009: Push - Global Age (Leon Bolier Remix)
- 2009: Arnej - "Dust In The Wind" (Leon Bolier Remix)
- 2009: W&W - "The Plan" (Leon Bolier Remix)
- 2009: Breakfast - Air Guitar (Leon Bolier Remix)
- 2008: Karl G featuring Vicky Fee - Repeat Again (Leon Bolier Remix)
- 2008: Airbase - "The Road Not Taken" (Leon Bolier Remix)
- 2008: Leon Bolier and Kamaya Painters - Endless Ocean Wave (Leon Bolier Mash-Up)
- 2008: Embrace - "Embrace" (Leon Bolier Remix)
- 2008: Seth Hutton featuring Judie Tzuke - Don't Look Behind You (Leon Bolier Remix)
- 2008: Jamaster A - Cicada (Leon Bolier Remix)
- 2007: Carlos - Alanda (Leon Bolier Remix)
- 2007: Joop - The Future (Leon Bolier Remix)
- 2007: Kenneth Thomas - Soleil Noir (Leon Bolier Remix)
- 2007: Joop - Prominent (Leon Bolier Remix)
- 2007: Dave202 - Torrent (Leon Bolier Remix)
- 2007: Evil Robot - Just Go! (Leon Bolier Remix)
- 2007: Activa - Genetic (Leon Bolier vs Joop Remix)
- 2007: Stephen J. Kroos - Formalistick (Leon Bolier Remix)
- 2007: Sied van Riel - Sigh (Leon Bolier Remix)
- 2007: Splitscreen - Boomblasta (Leon Bolier Vs. Joop Remix)
- 2006: Carlos - The Silmarillia 2007 (Leon Bolier Remix)
- 2006: Gott and Gordon - Midnight (Leon Bolier Remix)
- 2006: JPL - Ilmola (Leon Bolier Remix)
- 2006: Mike Shiver - Feelings (Leon Bolier Remix)
- 2006: Xtranova - The Way We Were (Leon Bolier Remix)
- 2005: Niklas Harding and Redshift - Pagoda (Leon Bolier Remix)
- 2004: Can and Schossow - Blabarsmonstret (Leon Bolier Remix)
