= I'd Do It All Again =

Single by Corinne Bailey Rae

from the album The Sea
- Released: 12 January 2010 (United States); 1 February 2010 (United Kingdom)
- Genre: Soul, jazz
- Length: 3:08 (album version)
- Label: EMI
- Songwriter: Corinne Bailey Rae
- Producers: Corinne Bailey Rae, Steve Chrisanthou

Corinne Bailey Rae singles chronology
""Breathless"" (2007)	"I'd Do It All Again" (2010)	"Paris Nights/New York Mornings" (2010)

"I'd Do It All Again" is the lead single from English singer Corinne Bailey Rae's second album The Sea and her first single in three years.

== Background ==
The song, which describes a partner's commitment to a relationship despite having moments of difficulty, was written by Rae immediately after an argument with her late husband Jason Rae in January 2008. She stated in an interview with The Observer's Sean O'Hagan that "It was written literally just after me and Jason had this massive disagreement, a big argument, a bad one. Almost as he was leaving the room, I just sat down and wrote it. It's just about how I felt about him at that time. Even right in the middle of the worst times, I remember thinking that I would choose this exact life again, that I would do it all again. It was me saying, I'm not wishing myself out of this situation. I'm 100 percent committed to this person. I don't have any regrets about this relationship even though there are all these difficult times."

Bailey Rae told The Sun: "There's a line in there that love is bigger than your pride and that's how I felt about him. No one was more right for me than him. No one."

Meanwhile, in terms of musically choosing 'I'd Do It All Again' as her first single in three years, she told noted UK soul writer Pete Lewis of Blues & Soul: "I felt it was a good way to re-introduce myself to people. Because it just starts with me playing my guitar and singing, but then all the different layers come in. And I really like the fact that it grows and swells to just one chorus, and then it retreats again. You know, it follows an unusual song form, and I felt it was an honest and raw song about love when things are difficult."

== Music video ==
The music video was directed by Jamie Thraves. Corinne Bailey Rae had been familiar with Thraves previous music videos, calling them "very real looking, cinematic and quite dark", according to Thraves. She asked for the same concept for her own music video.

Jamie Thraves shot the video in East Dulwich, a southern district of London, England. It begins with Rae awaking somberly in bed while singing the first few lines of the song. She is then shown in front of a mirror dabbing lightly at her cheek with a make-up brush before exiting for a walk outside. The video then cuts to Rae buying groceries, walking through a dimly lit subway, and then up a flight of stairs crowded with people who Rae has to weed through to get to her destination. The sequence of events repeats until the climax of the song where Rae breaks through the crowd of people and instead of awaking again in her bed. She tosses off her jacket and sings in front of moving traffic. Rae then runs into an alley where she stops to catch her breath. After this scene, the cycle of awaking in bed, fixing her make-up, buying groceries and so on, continues for the rest of the video.

Director Jamie Thraves said of the video's concept, "When I first heard the song I instantly saw her doing everyday things, shopping in a supermarket, walking through a park etc but always singing in an intimate fashion." He continues to say "We agreed that the song had a sad beginning, a hopeful middle and a sad ending, so that's what we aimed for with the visuals. She saw herself running at some point, so that inspired the running down the alleyway and gave me the idea of her walking in front of traffic. We both saw that moment as a great release in the video."

== Promotion ==
Rae performed her song live at the Dutch TV show X De Leeuw on March 13.

== Track listings and formats ==
- Digital download
1. "I'd Do It All Again" (Rae) – 3:07
- Promo CD
1. "I'd Do It All Again" (Rae) – 3:08
2. "I'd Do It All Again Instrumental" – 3:06

== Credits ==
- Written by Corinne Bailey Rae
- Produced by Steve Chrisanthou and Corinne Bailey Rae
- Vocals, Acoustic Guitar, Backing Vocals by Corinne Bailey Rae
- Drums by Luke Flowers
- Bass by John Ellis
- Organ, Backing Vocals by Steve Brown
- Electric Guitar by Paul Farr
- Backing Vocals by Jennifer Birch, John McCallum
- Cello Solo by Simon Denton

== Charts ==
Weekly chart performance for "I'd Do It All Again"
Chart (2010)	Peak position
Japan (Japan Hot 100)	11
South Korea International (Circle)	19

Annual chart rankings for "I'd Do It All Again"
Chart (2010)	Rank
Japan Adult Contemporary (Billboard)	53
