= Closer (Corinne Bailey Rae song) =

Single by Corinne Bailey Rae

from the album The Sea
- Released: 2 August 2010
- Genre: Soul, R&B, jazz
- Length: 4:17 (album version)
- Label: EMI
- Songwriter: Corinne Bailey Rae
- Producers: Corinne Bailey Rae, Steve Chrisanthou

Corinne Bailey Rae singles chronology
""Paris Nights/New York Mornings" (2010)	"Closer" (2010)	"Been to the Moon" (2016)

"Closer" is a song by English singer-songwriter Corinne Bailey Rae, released as the third and final single from her second studio album The Sea (2010). It was the third UK and worldwide single, and was released on 2 August 2010. It was also issued on the radio alone in the United States on 25 January 2010.

== Promotion ==
Bailey Rae's first television performance of the song was on The Ellen DeGeneres Show on 28 January.

== Critical reception ==
Early comments regarding "Closer," in album reviews for The Sea, were mixed.

Nick Day of Slant Magazine gave a mixed review of the song, stating:

"The moment the rhythm breaks, as with "Closer," it's a struggle to reengage with music that is so intensely personal, so overwhelmingly desolate and yet somehow unmemorable.

Also in a mixed review, Tony Hardy of Consequenceofsound wrote, "'Closer' finds the artiste in more of a classic R&B mode... the sentiments are bleak. It's accomplished stuff, but not as strong as the earlier songs."

However, Mayer Nassim from Digital Spy was more positive, expressing:

"The best moments here are when Rae lets her hair down. The deep soul of 'Closer' is a good example."

== Formats and track listings ==
UK Promo CD

1. "Closer" (Radio Edit) - 3:36
2. "Closer" (Instrumental) - 4:17

== Music video ==
The music video for "Closer" was directed by Adria Petty and premiered on 1 July 2010. It features the singer as she performs the song in a dark room, bringing "a dreamy, sensuous feel, perfect for a steamy summer playlist."

"I had such an amazing time making this video. The director, Adria Petty, has brilliant ideas," Bailey Rae said. "We both thought about the song's feel and independently imagined a slightly seventies look, Donna Summer sexy, abandoned roller disco fun." Of her favorite scene in the clip, she chooses the one which features her "with the veil inspired by a 1970s Vogue cover by Bianca Jagger." She added, "The choreographer Frank Gatson was on hand to offer me advice about movement in the video. He helped me focus on the strength shape I was making."

== Chart performance ==
The single spent 31 weeks inside the Hot R&B/Hip-Hop Songs and peaked at number 31, her highest chart single ever. On the week of 28 August 2010, the song returned to the Top 50 R&B/Hip-Hop Songs at number #50, and on the week of 4 September 2010, the song climbed higher to number #36.

== Charts ==
=== Weekly charts ===
Chart (2010)	Peak position
US Adult R&B Songs (Billboard)	7
US Hot R&B/Hip-Hop Songs (Billboard)	31

=== Year-end charts ===
Chart (2010)	Position
US Adult R&B Songs (Billboard)	15
US Hot R&B/Hip-Hop Songs (Billboard)	70

== Airplay and release history ==
=== Airplay ===
Country	Date	Format
United States	25 January 2010	Radio airplay
United Kingdom	7 July 2010	Video airplay

=== Purchasable release ===
Country	Date	Format	Label
United Kingdom	2 August 2010	Digital download	EMI Records
France	2 August 2010	Digital download	EMI Records
