= Philip Wilby =

British composer, organist and choir director

Philip Wilby (born Pontefract, 1949) is a British composer, organist and choir director.

== Education ==
Educated at Leeds Grammar School and Keble College, Oxford, he joined the staff at the University of Leeds as a Lecturer in the Department of Music in 1972. There he taught various composition, liturgy, directing, and score reading classes as well as co-founding the Leeds University Liturgical Choir.

== Music composing ==
Composing for many different instruments and ensembles (piano, organ, voice, chamber ensemble, wind orchestra), Wilby is most known for his compositions for brass band. Many of Wilby's pieces are based on his strong Christian beliefs. Famous works that fall in this category are ... Dove Descending, Revelation, and The New Jerusalem. Many of Wilby's works are written especially to be used as test pieces in brass band contests all over the world. One recent composition to fit this description is Vienna Nights, which was commissioned as the test piece for the 2006 British Open Brass Band Championship held in Symphony Hall, Birmingham. Most famously though Paganini Variations, one of his finest pieces of work, which was selected as the test piece for the 2011 Regional Championships (Championship Section) and has been used as the test piece for many other major competitions over the years, and has been recorded by a number of bands including Black Dyke, Fodens and Grimethorpe.

... Dove Descending was featured by Black Dyke Band at the 2007 BBC Promenade Concerts in a day devoted to music for brass. Wilby also wrote the descriptive Northern Lights commissioned by the Black Dyke Band which was scored for a brass band and 4 dancers. It was later adapted for the Contest Stage when it was selected for the Butlins Mineworkers Championships in January 2007.

One of his later compositions is entitled A Brontë Mass which was commissioned for the Leeds Philharmonic Society, in memory of their late Chairman, John Brodwell. The work includes poems by the Brontë sisters and text from Latin Mass. This piece premiered on Saturday 24 November 2007 at Leeds Town Hall. A recording, by The Bach Choir and Black Dyke Band, was made at Blackheath Halls in November 2009 and was released on a CD called Red Priest in September 2010. The title track of this CD Red Priest was commissioned by Black Dyke Band and first performed in the Brucknerhaus, Linz, Austria in May 2010 as part of the European Brass Band Championships. It was subsequently chosen as the test piece for the 2011 British Open Brass Band Championship.

== Commission ==
In 2013 he delivered a commission by the Halifax Choral Society to compose an oratorio in the English tradition for the Society's bicentenary in 2017. The work, The Holy Face is based on the life of John the Baptist, patron saint of Halifax. It was recorded in the Summer of 2017 and is to be presented for the first time in Halifax in October 2017.

== Personal ==
Philip Wilby now resides outside Ripon.

== Works ==
Several CDs of his music for brass and wind bands have been released on the Doyen label in recent years;

- Wilby
- Sacred Symphonies
- Vienna Nights
- Red Priest
- A Breathless Alleluia
- In Tribute
