= Lvndscape =

Dutch musical group formed in 2015

- Origin: Netherlands
- Genres: Deep house; tropical house
- Years active: 2015–present
- Label: Spinnin' Records
- Members: Lars de Vos
- Past members: Nick Baas

Lvndscape (stylized as LVNDSCAPE, pronounced "landscape") is a Dutch deep house and tropical house group of DJs and record producers, currently represented by DJ Lars de Vos. Signed to Spinnin' Records, they gained recognition for their bootleg of "Bloodstream" by Ed Sheeran and Rudimental, which received over 1.5 million plays on SoundCloud, and for their collaboration with Bolier for the remix of "Is This Love" by Bob Marley and the Wailers.

== Career ==
In 2015, they released a bootleg of "Bloodstream" by Ed Sheeran and Rudimental, which received over 1.5 million plays on SoundCloud. It was followed by a remix of "Rapture" by iiO and a remix of "Every Single Piece" by Redondo and Bolier. They then collaborated with Bolier for the single "Ragga". "Speeches" featuring Joel Baker was their last track of the year and was released in November. Dylan of EDM Sauce said that "Lvndscape infuses 'Speeches' with soaring synth melodies and a stunning saxophone solo for, what may be, his best production yet".

They collaborated with Holland Park for the single "Waterfalls" featuring Nico Santos to start off 2016. Diana Jadduroy of EDM Sauce stated that the single "delivers a laidback house tune, featuring sunny chords and vocals, brought by one of its main artists Lvndscape". It was followed by a collaboration with Yves Larock for the rework of the latter's single "Rise Up", titled "Rise Up 2k16". They then released a collaboration with Cheat Codes, titled "Fed Up". Dylan of EDM Sauce described the single as a "pop fueled trap banger that, to an extent, reminds me of "Where Are Ü Now" by Jack Ü and Justin Bieber during the chorus". In June, they and Bolier released a remix of "Is This Love" by Bob Marley and the Wailers, which charted in five countries. The song has been released through three labels: Spinnin' Records, Tuff Gong and Island Records. In September, they released their debut extended play titled V.

To start off 2017, they collaborated with Sander van Doorn to release a single titled "Need to Feel Loved". Shortly afterwards, they released a "Sunset Chill Mix" for the song. They then released the single "Walk Away", which featured Kaptan. In late June, their single "In My Mind" featuring Mi Manchi was released.

== Discography ==
=== Extended plays ===
- 2016: V [Spinnin' Records]
- 2017: Dive with Me [Spinnin' Records]
- 2019: Hanging On [Spinnin' Records]
- 2021: Fall Into the Night [Spinnin' Records]

=== Charting singles ===
Year	Title	Peak chart positions						Album
Year	Title	NLD	AUS	BEL (Vl)	SCO	SWE	UK	Album
2016	"Is This Love" (Bob Marley featuring Lvndscape and Bolier)	69	97	21	7	67	16	Non-album single
2016	"Everyday My Life"	—	—	1	—	—	—	V
2017	"Need to Feel Loved" (with Sander van Doorn)	—	—	39	—	—	—	Non-album singles
2017	"Walk Away" (featuring Kaptan)	—	—	23	—	—	—	Non-album singles
"—" denotes a recording that did not chart or was not released in that territory.

=== Singles ===
- 2015: "Ragga" (with Bolier) [Source]
- 2015: "Speeches" (featuring Joel Baker) [Source]
- 2016: "Waterfalls" (with Holland Park featuring Nico Santos) [Source]
- 2016: "Rise Up 2K16" (with Yves Larock featuring Jaba) [Spinnin' Records]
- 2016: "Fed Up" (with Cheat Codes) [Spinnin' Deep]
- 2016: "Is This Love" (with Bob Marley and Bolier) [Spinnin' Deep]
- 2016: "Everyday My Life" [Spinnin' Records]
- 2017: "Need to Feel Loved" (with Sander van Doorn) [Doorn Records]
- 2017: "Walk Away" (featuring Kaptan) [Spinnin' Records]
- 2017: "In My Mind" (featuring Mi Manchi) [Spinnin' Records]
- 2017: "Dive with Me" (featuring Cathrine Lassen) [Spinnin' Records]
- 2018: "Know You Better" (with Sam Feldt featuring Tessa) [Spinnin' Records]
- 2018: "What Would You Do" (featuring Ruby Prophet) [Spinnin' Records]
- 2018: "Gumburanjo" [Spinnin' Records]
- 2018: "Riot (Lo Lo Loco)" (featuring Alida) [Spinnin' Records]
- 2018: "Apologize" (featuring Frida Sumeno, Jdam and Mon) [Spinnin' Records]
- 2018: "Yayamari" [Spinnin' Records]
- 2019: "Home" (featuring Jae Hall) [Spinnin' Records]
- 2019: "Baylamtu" [Spinnin' Records]
- 2019: "Down Under" (with Rat City) [Spinnin' Records]
- 2019: "What I'd Give" [Spinnin' Records]
- 2020: "I'm Like a Bird" (with John Adams) [Spinnin' Records]
- 2020: "No One Nobody" (featuring Tannergard) [Spinnin' Records]
- 2020: "Happier to Lose" [Spinnin' Records]
- 2020: "Turn Off the Radio" (featuring Øzma) [Spinnin' Records]
- 2021: "Bad Trip" (featuring Øzma) [Spinnin' Records]
- 2021: "Say It a Little Louder" (with Mathieu Koss) [Spinnin' Records]
- 2021: "Everyone's Lonely" (featuring Ally Ahern) [Spinnin' Records]
- 2021: "Losing My Mind" (with Amely) [Mentalo Music]
- 2022: "Because of You" [Spinnin' Records]
- 2022: "Alone (with John Dory) [Spinnin' Records]

=== Remixes ===
- 2015: Redondo and Bolier featuring She Keeps Bees - "Every Single Piece" (Lvndscape Remix) [Source]
- 2015: Sander van Doorn - "Ori Tali Ma" (Lvndscape Remix) [Source]
- 2015: Bolier and Natalie Peris - "Forever and a Day" (Lvndscape Remix) [Source]
- 2017: Sander van Doorn and Lvndscape - "Need to Feel Loved" (Lvndscape Sunset Chill Mix) [Doorn Records]
- 2018: Purple Haze featuring James New - "Fall In" (Lvndscape Remix) [Doorn Records]
- 2019: Haevn - "City Lights" (Lvndscape Remix) [Haevn Music]
- 2021: Empress - "I Won't Go Quietly" (Lvndscape Remix) [Empress Music]
