= The New Jerusalem (Wilby) =

The New Jerusalem is a work for brass band by the British composer Philip Wilby. It was commissioned by the National Youth Brass Band of Great Britain, and first performed by them at City Hall, Salisbury in April 1990.

The work was composed during the collapse of the Eastern Bloc. Wilby saw the Book of Revelation as forcefully reflecting the turbulence and optimism of contemporary political events. The title of the work is thus derived from Revelation 21:1-2, which is quoted at the top of the score:

And I saw a new heaven and a new earth: for the first heaven and the first earth were passed away; and there was no more sea.
And I John saw the holy city, new Jerusalem, coming down from God out of heaven, prepared as a bride adorned for her husband.

Wilby saw his work as representing "a sure triumph of the human spirit over oppression, a sense of liberty and resurrection drawn out of sorrow and pain". The off-stage solo cornet fanfares and the dynamic nature of the composition as a whole are designed to convey this sentiment.

== Contest version ==
The original version of The New Jerusalem was for a large group of players. Wilby revised the work for a conventional number of brass band musicians and this version was used as the contest piece for the final of the 1992 National Brass Band Championship of Great Britain. The Grimethorpe Colliery Band won the competition with its performance of Wilby's piece not long after Grimethorpe Colliery's closure. The film Brassed Off, which depicts the 1992 championship finals, has the finale from the William Tell Overture in place of The New Jerusalem.
