= Pictures (Leon Bolier album) =

Studio album by Leon Bolier
- Released: September 29, 2008
- Genre: Trance
- Label: Spinnin', 2 Play Records

Singles from Pictures
- 1. "I Finally Found"

Pictures is the debut studio album by trance musician Leon Bolier, released on September 29, 2008.

== Track listing ==
=== Disc one ===
1. "Huachinango"
2. "Off Shore"
3. "Darling Harbour"
4. "Dnipro"
5. "I Finally Found" (featuring Simon Binkenborn)
6. "XD"
7. "Interludium"
8. "Meditate"
9. "YE"
10. "Beyrouth"
11. "Ocean Drive Boulevard"
12. "Longing For" (featuring Jady-Mayne)

=== Disc two ===
1. "Singapore"
2. "Summernight Confessions"
3. Leon Bolier and Daniel Wanrooy - "Lust"
4. Leon Bolier and DJ Astrid - "Crazy People" (Alternative Mix)
5. Leon Bolier and Galen Behr - "Acapulco"
6. "Poseidon"
7. Leon Bolier and Jonas Steur - "Lost Luggage"
8. Leon Bolier Vs. Cliff Coenraad and Thomas Hagenbeek - "Dirtbiter"
9. Leon Bolier and Global Illumination - "Portraits of Spain"
10. Leon Bolier and Sied van Riel - "Exhibit" (featuring Maria Georgiou a.k.a. MIA)
11. Leon Bolier and Joop - "Strike One"
12. "Artefakt"
