= Paris Nights/New York Mornings =

Single by Corinne Bailey Rae

from the album The Sea
- Released: 29 March 2010 (United Kingdom)
- Genre: Soul, R&B
- Length: 3:51 (album version)
- Label: EMI
- Songwriter: Corinne Bailey Rae
- Producers: Corinne Bailey Rae, Steve Chrisanthou

Corinne Bailey Rae singles chronology
"I'd Do It All Again" (2010)	"Paris Nights/New York Mornings" (2010)	"Closer" (2010)

"Paris Nights/New York Mornings" is a single by UK soul singer Corinne Bailey Rae. It was issued as the second single from her second album The Sea. It was released on 29 March 2010 on EMI and added to the BBC Radio 2 A-list on 3 March 2010.

== Music video ==
The video for "Paris Nights/New York Mornings" was shot in Paris and was directed by Charles Mehling. The U.S. premiere of the video was on Amazon's Corinne Bailey Rae webstore on 11 February 2010. The UK premiere of the video was on MSN's web site on 15 February 2010.

The video for the single features Rae walking around the streets and various sites of Paris. The final scene of the video shows Rae getting into a yellow taxi, that features a New York number plate.

== Promotion ==
Bailey Rae's first television performance of the song was on the Alan Carr: Chatty Man show on Channel 4 on 4 February 2010, the week of The Sea's release.

== Critical reception ==
Comments regarding "Paris Nights/New York Mornings", in album reviews for The Sea were mixed. Kitty Empire of The Observer gave a negative review of the song, stating: "It is not flawless – the deeply dippy "Paris Nights/New York Mornings" feels out of place". In a mixed review, Tony Hardy of Consequence of Sound said the song provides something of an up tempo and lyrical diversion. However, Uncut magazine were more positive expressing: "There are lighter, more chart-friendly moments. "Paris Nights/New York Mornings" has an abundance of sass."

== Formats and track listings ==
Digital download

1. "Paris Nights/New York Mornings" - 3:51
2. "Love's On Its Way (Live at the Tabernacle, London) - 4:20

== Chart performance ==
Chart (2010)	Peak position
Japan (Japan Hot 100)	31
UK Airplay	30

== Release history ==
Region	Date	Format	Label
United Kingdom	March 29, 2010	Digital download	EMI
