= Corey James =

English disc jockey, producer and remixer

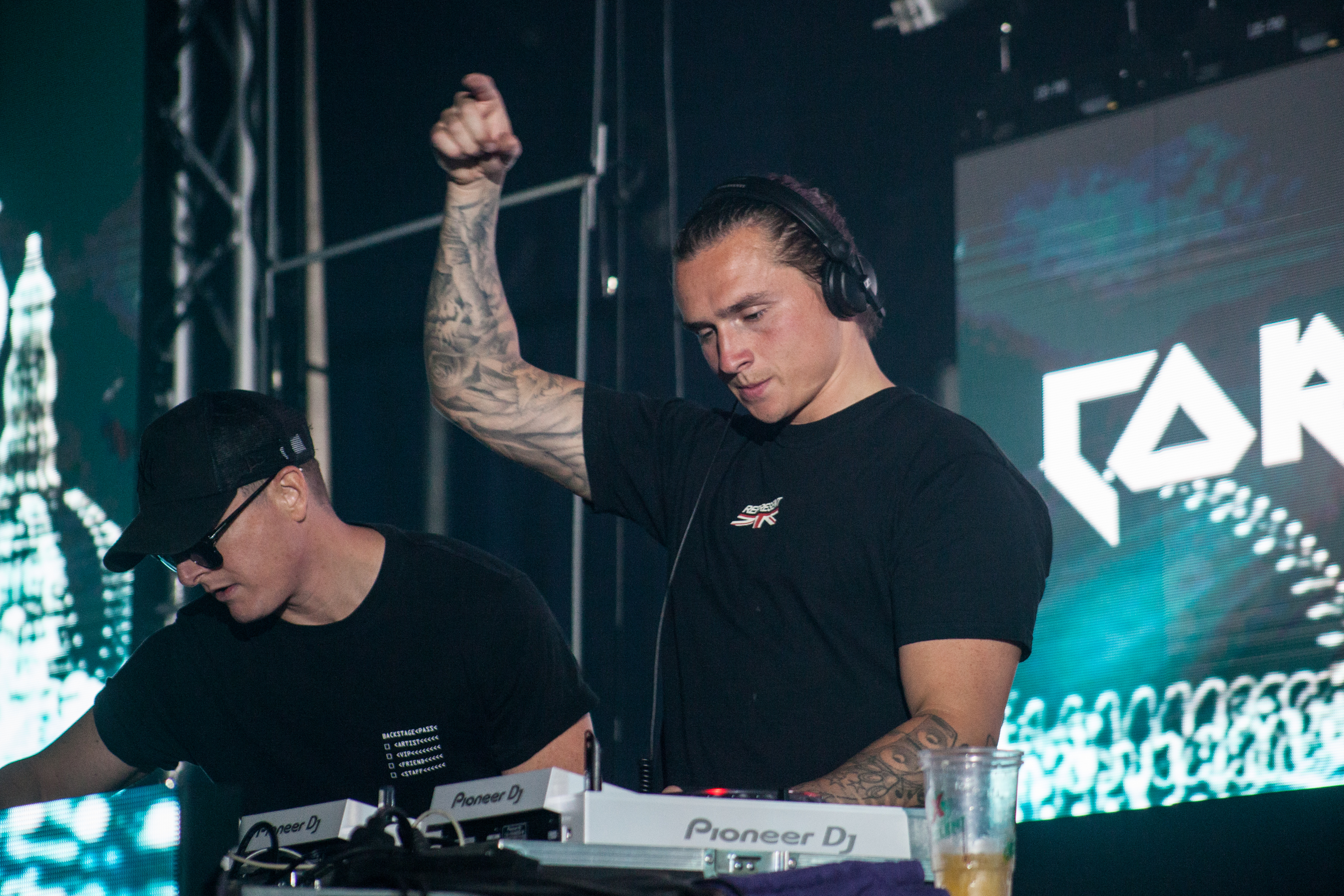
- Corey James (right) performing at Beats for Love (2019)

Background information
- Born: Corey James John Rutherford; 8 August 1992 (age 33); Wirral, United Kingdom
- Genres: house music, electronic dance music
- Occupations: Disc jockey; producer; Remixer
- Instruments: Music sequencer, synthesizer, piano
- Years active: 2014-present
- Labels: Protocol Recordings, Big Beat Records, Spinnin' Records, Fonk Recordings, Armada Music, Size Records

Corey James is an English disc jockey, producer and remixer.

== Biography ==
During his career, he has released many electronic dance music records on labels such as Size Records, Protocol Recordings, Big Beat Records, Sosumi Records, Spinnin' Records, Fonk Recordings and Armada Music. His repertoire also includes numerous remixes and bootlegs for artists such as Steve Angello, Galantis, Alesso, Feenixpawl, AN21 and Max Vangeli. James's passion for house music appeared at a young age through his hometown's cultural love of music. Watching Steve Angello's live performance in Cream Liverpool was the defining moment in his plan to pursue a career in the music industry. He was named one of the Top 100 Producers by 1001Tracklists, a ranking reflecting DJ support. James performed at Creamfields festival on 28 August 2016 and joined Steve Angello on his BBC Radio 1 residency on 17 November 2016.

== Discography ==
=== Extended plays and singles ===
Year	Title	Label
2015	"Collage" (with John Christian and Arin Tone)	Protocol Recordings
2015	"Tenpaku" (with Will-K)	Sosumi Records
2015	"Naboo" (with Tom Tyger)	Sosumi Records
2015	"Covka" (with Will-K)	Protocol Recordings
2015	"Morning Sun" (with Joakim Molitor)	Eclypse
2015	"Migori" (with Jacob Ross)	Code Red
2016	"Lmsy"	Fonk Recordings
2016	"Another Storm" (with Will-K)	Release Records
2016	"Make The Crowd Go" (with Teamworx)	Protocol Recordings
2016	"Rule The Nation"	Show Land (Armada)
2016	"Ti Enko"	Sosumi Records
2016	"Let Me See You" (with Will-K)	Fonk Recordings (Armada)
2017	"With You" (with Santez)	Size Records
2017	"Bring It"	Protocol Recordings
2017	"Bird Flu" (with Tom Staar)	Cartel Recordings
2017	Time Goes by EP (with Marcus Schössow)	Code Red Music
2017	"Back In Time" (with Henko)	Size Records
2017	"Funky Music" (with Teamworx)	Size Records
2017	"Riu" (with Will-K)	NoFace Records
2018	"Arlanda" (with David Pietras)	Size Records
2018	"Eros" (with Years)	Matchbox Records
2018	"Find You" (featuring Nino Lucarelli)	Protocol Recordings
2018	"12 O'Clock" (with Crusy and Jose De Mara)	Size Records
2018	"No Way Out" (with Andero)	Matchbox Records
2018	"Orinoco" (with Thomas Gold)	Armada Music / Size Records
2018	"To Live" (with David Pietras featuring Bryant Powell)	Protocol Recordings
2019	"DNA"	Size Records
2019	"Artifact From 83" (with Santez)	Size Records
2019	"Save Me" (with Marcus Santoro featuring Nino Lucarelli)	Heldeep Records
2020	"The Light" (featuring Shaun Walsh)	Release Deep
2020	"Don't Stop" (featuring Spyder)	Protocol Records
2020	"Somewhere In My Heart" (with Stevie Krash)	Size Records
2020	"Alive" (with Giorg & Santez)	Size Records
2021	"Aura" (with Futuristic Polar Bears featuring Møøne)	Protocol Recordings
2021	"Let Go" (with Jay Mac featuring Jodie Knight)	Krank
2021	"Sirens Calling" (with Truth Be Told)	Enhanced Music
2021	"Back For Nothing"	Size Records
2022	"No Turning Back" (with Jodie Knight)	Enhanced Music

=== Remixes ===
Year	Artist	Title	Label
2015	Galantis	"Runaway (U & I)"	Free Download
2015	Walden and Havana Brown	"No Ordinary Love"	Big Beat Records
2015	David Tort and Nick Marsh featuring Crystal Waters	"Let Me Be The One"	Zerothree
2015	AN21 & Max Vangeli	"Tonight"	Size Records
2015	Moor & Avaro featuring Anavi	"Kwango (There 4 You)"	We Play
2015	Steve Angello	"Remember"	Unreleased
2015	The Chemical Brothers	"Hey Boy Hey Girl"	Free Download
2015	Justin Strikes and Aymso & Kalen	"Jungle"	Ones To Watch
2016	Flo Rida feat. Sam Martin	"Dirty Mind"	Atlantic Records
2016	Marcus Schössow and New_ID	"Ada"	Code Red
2016	Miike Snow	"My Trigger"	Free Download
2017	Highly Sedated	"Highly Sedated"	Size Records
2018	David Guetta featuring Bebe Rexha and J Balvin	"Say My Name"	What A Music
2018	Steve Angello featuring Sam Martin	"Nothing Scares Me Anymore" (with David Pietras)	Size Records

=== Compilations ===
- The Sound Of Sosumi Vol. 1. – Sosumi Records (12 October 2015)
