= Marcus Schössow =

Swedish DJ and producer (born 1985)

- Also known as: Chase My Rabbit, Progresia
- Born: 28 October 1985 (age 40); Helsingborg, Sweden
- Genres: Progressive house; progressive trance
- Occupations: DJ; record producer
- Instruments: Piano; guitar; synthesizer
- Years active: 2004–present
- Labels: Revealed Recordings; Armada Music; Code Red Music; Tone Diary
- Website: www.marcusschossow.com

Marcus Schössow (Swedish pronunciation: [ˈmǎrːkɵs ˈɧœ̌sːɔv]; born 28 October 1985) is a Swedish DJ and producer. He has also produced under the name Progresia, collaborated with Sebastian Brandt under the name Under Sun, and lead the group gardenstate. In 2022, he joined his friend Thomas Sägstad to form the band anamē.

== Biography ==
"Liceu", "Reverie" and "The Universe" (with Arston) are his major successes, reaching respectively the 8th, 11th, and 13th place in the top 100 downloads on Beatport.

He owns his recently established label Code Red Music. Since its inception, four singles were released on the label, including "Generations" by the Dutch duo Magnificence.

== Discography ==
=== Studio albums ===
- 2009: Outside The Box [Tone Diary]

=== Extended plays ===
- 2008: Kiev [Tone Diary]
- 2012: Lights Out [Tone Diary]
- 2014: Decade Number 3 EP (Tequila, Space, Bang The Drum (AN21 and Sebjak)) [Size Records]
- 2017: Raw / Agapis [Code Red Music]
- 2017: Time Goes By / Tough Love (with Corey James) [Code Red Music]

=== Singles ===
- 2008: "Swamptramp" (with Thomas Sägstad) [Oxygen]
- 2008: "Girls Suckcess" [Tone Diary]
- 2008: "The Last Pluck" [Tone Diary]
- 2009: "From My Heart" [Tone Diary]
- 2009: "Kaboom" [Tone Diary]
- 2009: "Spring Break Hook Up" (with Sägstad) [Tone Diary]
- 2010: "London 1985" (with 1985) [Anjunadeep]
- 2010: "Kofola" (with Robert Burian) [Tone Diary]
- 2010: "2099" (with Leon Bolier) [Tone Diary]
- 2010: "Genre This" [Tone Diary]
- 2010: "Strings" [Tone Diary]
- 2010: "1985" (featuring 1985) [Anjunadeep]
- 2011: "Dome" (with Thomas Sagstad) [Spinnin Records]
- 2011: "Alright 2011" (with Red Carpet) [Spinnin Records]
- 2011: "Acid Festival Champagne & Bitches" [Spinnin Records]
- 2011: "Swedish Nights" [Tone Diary]
- 2011: "Las Vegas" [Spinnin Records]
- 2012: "Never Say Never" [Tone Diary]
- 2012: "Who You Are" (with Matias Lehtola) [Tone Diary]
- 2012: "Hurry Up" (with Elleah) [Tone Diary]
- 2012: "Beach Chords" (with Leon Bolier) [Streamlined]
- 2012: "Helvete" [Garuda]
- 2013: "'Liceu" (with Sebjak) [Size Records]
- 2013: "Reverie" [Axtone Records]
- 2013: "Kemi" (with Sebjak) [Spinnin Records]
- 2013: "Wild Child" (with Adrian Lux) [Ultra]
- 2013: "Ulysses" (with Mike Hawkins and Pablo Oliveros) [Size Records]
- 2014: "The Universe" (with Arston) [Revealed Recordings]
- 2014: "Lionheart" (featuring The Royalties STHLM) [Armada Trice]
- 2015: "Zulu" [Code Red Music]
- 2015: "Smil" [Code Red Music]
- 2015: "Aware" [Axtone Records]
- 2015: "CNTRL" (Club Edit) (with Dave Winnel) [SIZE Records]
- 2016: "Polygon" [Code Red Music]
- 2016: "1994" (with Magnificence) (Doorn Records)
- 2016: "ADA" (with NEW ID) [Code Red Music]
- 2016: "Cartagena" (with Dirtywork) [Code Red Music]
- 2017: "Polygon" (with JAZ von D) [Red Beat Music]
- 2017: "White Lies" [Red Beat Music]
- 2017: "Rumble" [Code Red Music]
- 2017: "Boriquas" (with SOVTH) [Code Red Music]
- 2017: "Tell Me Why" [Code Red Music]
- 2018: "Red Lights" (with Cape Lion) [Code Red Music]

=== Remixes ===
- 2013: Adrian Lux - "Damaged" (Marcus Schossow 'Ibiza Love' Remix) [Ultra]
- 2014: Icona Pop - "Just Another Night" (Marcus Schossow Remix) [Big Beat Records]
- 2014: TV Rock and Walden - "See Me Run" (Marcus Schossow Remix) [Neon Records]
- 2014: Tamra and Oakenfold - "Sleep" (Marcus Schossow Perfecto Mix) [Perfecto Records]
- 2014: Charli XCX - "Boom Clap" (Marcus Shossow Remix)
- 2015: Axwell Λ Ingrosso – "Sun Is Shining" (Marcus Schossow and Years remix) [Def Jam]
- 2015: Dimitri Vegas & Like Mike featuring Ne-Yo – "Higher Place" (Marcus Schossow Remix) [Smash The House]
- 2017: Axwell Λ Ingrosso – "More Thank You Know" (Marcus Schossow Remix) [Def Jam]
- 2017: Sovth - "Boriquas" (Marcus Schössow Edit) [Code Red Music]
- 2018: Zedd featuring Echosmith - "Illusion" (Marcus Schossow and Years Remix) [Unreleased]
- 2018: Marcus Schössow and Cape Lion - "Red Lights" (Marcus Schossow No Lights Remix)
