= Is This Love (Bob Marley and the Wailers song) =

1978 single by Bob Marley and the Wailers

- Artwork for UK and Italian releases

Single by Bob Marley and the Wailers

from the album Kaya
- B-side: "Crisis"
- Released: 3 February 1978
- Genre: Reggae
- Length: 3:52
- Label: Tuff Gong, Island
- Songwriter: Bob Marley

Bob Marley and the Wailers singles chronology
"Jamming" / "Punky Reggae Party" (1977)	"Is This Love" (1978)	"Blackman Redemption" (1978)

Music video
- "Is This Love" on YouTube

"Is This Love" is a song by Bob Marley and the Wailers, released on their 1978 album Kaya. The song became one of Marley's best-known songs and was part of the Legend compilation. It peaked at number 9 in the UK charts upon its release in 1978. A live rendition of the song can be found on the Babylon by Bus live album from Paris in 1978.

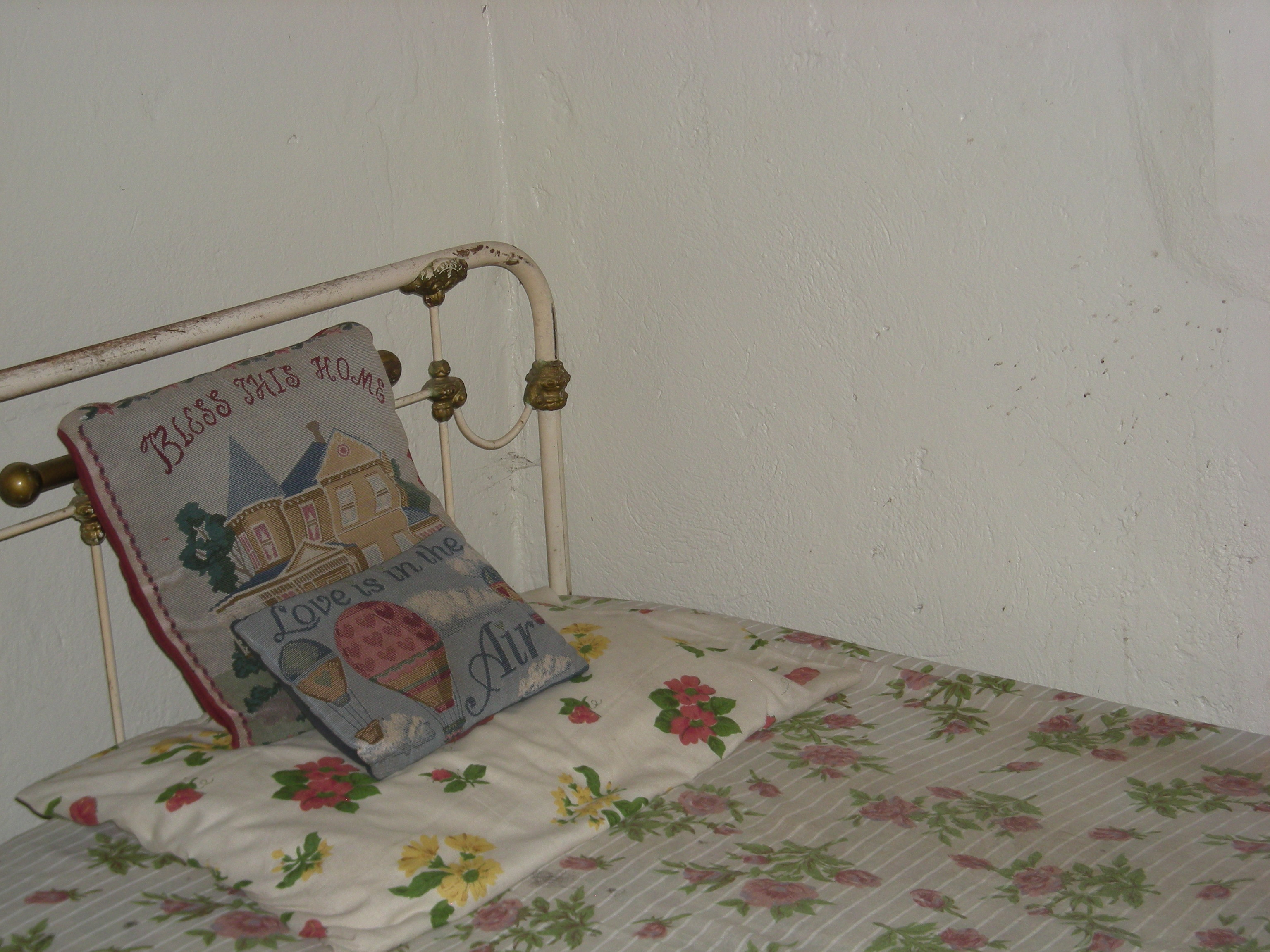
Bob Marley's bed in Nine Mile, Jamaica, which was the inspiration for the lyric "We'll share the shelter of my single bed" in the song "Is This Love"

== Music video ==
A music video was also produced, shot at the Keskidee Arts Centre in London; in the video, future supermodel Naomi Campbell, then seven years old, made her first appearance in the public eye.

== Lvndscape and Bolier remix ==
"Is This Love"

Single by Bob Marley featuring Lvndscape and Bolier
- Released: 10 June 2016
- Genre: Tropical house
- Length: 3:20
- Label: Spinnin'
- Songwriter: Bob Marley

Bob Marley singles chronology
"Stand Up Jamrock" (2005)	"Is This Love" (2016)

Lvndscape singles chronology
"Fed Up" (2016)	"Is This Love" (2016)	"Everyday My Life" (2016)

Bolier singles chronology
"Sweet Love (Calling Out Your Name)" (2016)	"Is This Love" (2016)	"Ipanema" (2016)

Music video
- "Is This Love" (Remix) on YouTube

In June 2016, the song was remixed by Dutch electronic music collaborators Lvndscape and Bolier, and the remix version reached #16 single in the UK. The music video was released via Spinnin' Records YouTube channel on 17 June 2016.

== Notable covers ==
The following artists have covered the song:

- The Pat Travers Band, on their 1980 album Crash and Burn.
- Carly Simon, on her 1983 album Hello Big Man.
- Hawaiian reggae music group Three Plus, on their 2003 album 3+ 4 U. That album won the 2003 Na Hoku Hanohano Award for Reggae Album of the Year. Their version of "Is This Love" is also included on the 2010 compilation album Putamayo Presents: Tribute To A Reggae Legend: Bob Marley.
- Scott Matthews, as a bonus track on his 2009 album Elsewhere.
- Corinne Bailey Rae, on the 2011 EP The Love EP. This version was released as a single and won the Grammy Award for Best R&B Performance at the 54th Grammy Awards.

=== Live covers ===
- Rihanna covered the song during her first worldwide Good Girl Gone Bad Tour (2007—09). The performance is included in her DVD album Good Girl Gone Bad Live.
- Adam Lambert covered the song in an acoustic set in Sydney, Australia, in the summer of 2012, as well as in his 2013 "We Are Glamily" world tour.
- Allen Stone performed the Corinne Bailey Rae version of this song on the tour for his self-titled album, Allen Stone.

== In popular culture ==
- The song is played in the movies In the Name of the Father (1993), Six Days Seven Nights (1998), Lake Placid (1999), 50 First Dates (2004) and Just Go With It (2011).
- The song is featured as the theme for the ending credits of Dead or Alive Xtreme Beach Volleyball as well as its sequel, Dead or Alive Xtreme 2.
- In the book Marley & Me, author John Grogan says that he and his wife Jenny came up with the name Marley for their dog when, during an argument about what to name him, Jenny walked to the tape deck and pushed play, and the song started playing.
- A reference to the song is made in the lyrics "Just like the song on our radio set / We'll share the shelter of my single bed" from James Blunt's song "Stay the Night", the first single of the 2010 album Some Kind of Trouble.
- Bon Jovi's song "Lay Your Hands on Me" opens with the lyrics "You're ready, I'm willing and able / Help me lay my cards down on the table", which bears a clear similarity to the lyrics of "Is This Love".

== Charts ==
=== Bob Marley and the Wailers ===
==== Weekly charts ====
Chart (1978)	Peak position
Australia (Kent Music Report)	11
Netherlands (Single Top 100)	39
New Zealand (Recorded Music NZ)	8
Norway (VG-lista)	8
Sweden (Sverigetopplistan)	16
UK Singles (OCC)	9
Chart (2016)	Peak position
Switzerland (Schweizer Hitparade)	57

==== Year-end charts ====
Chart (1978)	Position
Australia (Kent Music Report)	83

=== Corinne Bailey Rae ===
==== Weekly charts ====
Chart (2010)	Peak position
Japan (Japan Hot 100)	72
South Korea International (Circle)	25

=== Bob Marley featuring LVNDSCAPE and Bolier ===
==== Weekly charts ====
Chart (2016–19)	Peak position
Australia (ARIA)	97
Hungary (Single Top 40)	18
Netherlands (Single Top 100)	69
Scotland Singles (OCC)	7
Sweden (Sverigetopplistan)	67
UK Singles (OCC)	16

== Certifications ==
Region	Certification	Certified units/sales
Brazil (Pro-Música Brasil)	Gold	30,000^{*}
Denmark (IFPI Danmark)	Platinum	90,000^{‡}
Germany (BVMI)	Gold	250,000^{‡}
Italy (FIMI)	Platinum	50,000^{‡}
New Zealand (RMNZ)	7× Platinum	210,000^{‡}
Spain (Promusicae)	2× Platinum	120,000^{‡}
United Kingdom (BPI)	2× Platinum	1,200,000^{‡}
United Kingdom (BPI) Remix	Gold	400,000^{‡}
^{*} Sales figures based on certification alone.^{‡} Sales+streaming figures based on certification alone.
