= The Clothworkers Consort of Leeds =

The Clothworkers Consort of Leeds (TheCCLeeds), previously the Leeds University Liturgical Choir, is a choir that primarily performs sacred choral music in liturgical settings. It was formed by Bryan White, Stephen Muir and Philip Wilby of the School of Music, University of Leeds in 2002. The choir draws its membership from across the whole University, and has included undergraduates, postgraduates and staff from the departments of Physics, English, Molecular Biology, Music, Classics, Electronic & Electrical Engineering, Joint Honours, Earth Sciences, and The Lifelong Learning Centre. Its name derives from its rehearsal venue, the Clothworkers Concert Hall, a converted chapel on the university campus, itself named for the Worshipful Company of Clothworkers which has a long-standing connection with the university.

It has performed in a variety of prestigious venues, including York Minster, St Paul's Cathedral, Wells Cathedral, Beverley Minster, Bristol Cathedral, Ely Cathedral, and the Czech Embassy, London. The choir has conducted successful concert tours to Prague (Easter 2005) and Germany (Summer 2007), and was one of only twelve from around the world to be invited to participate in the Universitas Cantat International Choral Festival in Poznań, Poland in June 2005.

It has recorded two CDs: Songs of Praise: Music from the West Riding (Doyen: 2004), and Vox Dei (SoundRecording: 2006), featuring world premiere recordings of music by Samuel Wesley, Maurice Greene, George Holmes, and Leeds University composers James Brown and Philip Wilby.

Recent events have included a recording for BBC's Songs of Praise (broadcast 6 April 2008), participation in a recording with singer-songwriter Corinne Bailey Rae (release date to be confirmed), and preparation of a third CD recording.

== Choral Composition Competition ==
The choir held an annual Choral Composition Competition sponsored by the Leeds Philosophical and Literary Society.

Previous winners:
Ian Sapiro, Khatzi kaddish (2006, winner)
Terry Mann, Gabriel fram Hevene-King (2007, joint winner)
Vicki Burrett, Above and beyond (2007, joint winner)
Wayland Rogers, Inscription for a Wayside Spring (2008, winner)
Lauren Redhead, microtonal setting of Psalm 145 vs 14 (2008, highly commended)
