= The Love EP (Corinne Bailey Rae EP) =

EP by Corinne Bailey Rae
- Released: 25 January 2011
- Studios: 9:30 Club (Washington, D.C.); Denzel Oscar Studio (Leeds, England); Studio 150 (Amsterdam, Netherlands)
- Length: 28:44
- Label: Capitol
- Producers: Steve Brown; Corinne Bailey Rae

Corinne Bailey Rae chronology
| The Sea (2010) | The Love EP (2011) | The Heart Speaks in Whispers (2016) |

Singles from The Love EP
- 1. "Is This Love" Released: 21 September 2010

The Love EP is the fourth extended play (EP) by English singer-songwriter Corinne Bailey Rae. It was released on 25 January 2011 by Capitol Records. The EP consists of five cover versions of love songs. Bailey Rae has described The Love EP as "an homage to some of my favourite musicians and a conversation between some of my musical influences". The first single, a cover of Bob Marley and the Wailers' "Is This Love", won the Grammy Award for Best R&B Performance at the 54th Grammy Awards.

== Critical reception ==
Professional ratings
Aggregate scores
| Source | Rating |
|---|---|
| Metacritic | 77/100 |
Review scores
| Source | Rating |
| AllMusic | 3.5/5 stars |
| Consequence of Sound | C− |
| Entertainment Weekly | B |
| Okayplayer | 89/100 |
| PopMatters | 6/10 |

The Love EP received generally positive reviews from music critics. At Metacritic, which assigns a normalised rating out of 100 to reviews from mainstream publications, the album received an average score of 69, based on six reviews. Andy Kellman of AllMusic viewed the EP as "a light stop-gap to hold fans over until Rae's third album", adding that "it's all the more enjoyable to hear the singer indulge herself and have a little fun with a set of favorites." Zach Gase of Okayplayer commended Bailey Rae for her versatility and wrote that "[t]here really isn't a weak moment on The Love EP." Greg Kot of Entertainment Weekly noted that Bailey Rae sounds "spunkier" than usual on the EP, citing her rendition of "Que Sera Sera" as a highlight.

Frank Mojica of Consequence of Sound stated, "While every cover on The Love may not be exceptional, Corinne Bailey Rae once again exhibits remarkable vocal and musical range." David Mine of PopMatters named "Que Sera Sera" the standout track of the EP, but felt that "[e]lsewhere, results are mixed", concluding, "If nothing else, Rae is to be commended for branching out and trying new styles, but it's that final song that really makes this record worthwhile."

== Track listing ==
| No. | Title | Writer(s) | Producer(s) | Length |
|---|---|---|---|---|
| 1. | "I Wanna Be Your Lover" | Prince Rogers Nelson | Steve Brown; Corinne Bailey Rae | 3:30 |
| 2. | "Low Red Moon" | Tanya Donelly | Brown; Bailey Rae | 5:01 |
| 3. | "Is This Love" | Bob Marley | Brown; Bailey Rae | 3:29 |
| 4. | "My Love" | Paul McCartney; Linda McCartney | Brown; Bailey Rae | 3:17 |
| 5. | "Que Sera Sera" (live; recorded 13 May 2010 at the 9:30 Club in Washington, D.C.) | Ray Evans; Jay Livingston | | 13:27 |

== Personnel ==
Credits adapted from the liner notes of The Love EP.

- Corinne Bailey Rae – vocals (all tracks); percussion (tracks 1, 2); backing vocals (tracks 1–3); production (tracks 1–4); Marxophone (track 2); arrangement (track 3); glockenspiel (track 4); electric guitar, premix (track 5)
- Bryan Adams – photography
- Gerard Albo – mixing, recording (track 5)
- Barny – mixing (track 2)
- Jennifer Birch – guitar (track 2); backing vocals, electric guitar (track 5)
- Steve Brown – percussion (track 1); engineering, production (tracks 1–4); keyboards (tracks 1, 4, 5); glockenspiel, Marxophone (track 2); synths (tracks 2, 3); arrangement, organ, piano, programming, Wurlitzer (track 3); backing vocals (tracks 3–5); premix (track 5)
- Matt Colton – mastering
- Ruadhri Cushnan – mixing (track 1)
- Luke Flowers – drums (all tracks)
- Kenny Higgins – bass (tracks 1, 3, 5); Spanish guitar (track 3); vocals (track 5)
- Gordon H. Jee – creative director
- Randall Leddy – design
- Nelson Lugo – mix assistance (track 4)
- John McCallum – guitar (track 1); acoustic guitar, additional electric guitar (tracks 2, 4); backing vocals (tracks 3, 4); electric guitar (tracks 3, 5); additional vocal arrangement (track 4); vocals (track 5)
- Joeri Saal – engineering (track 3)
- Ray Staff – mastering
- Phil Tan – mixing (track 3)
- Ghian Wright – mixing (track 4)

== Charts ==
| Chart (2011) | Peak position |
|---|---|
| US Billboard 200 | 86 |
| US Top R&B/Hip-Hop Albums (Billboard) | 20 |

== Release history ==
| Region | Date | Format | Label | Ref. |
|---|---|---|---|---|
| Canada | 25 January 2011 | CD; digital download | Capitol | |
| United States | 25 January 2011 | CD; digital download | Capitol | |
| United Kingdom | 14 February 2011 | CD; digital download | Virgin | |
