= Bitter's Kiss =

- Origin: Weehawken, New Jersey
- Genres: Indie pop
- Website: www.bitterskiss.com

Bitter's Kiss is an indie pop project from Weehawken, New Jersey led by musician Chloe Baker. She is best known for her singles No One Will and Love Won't Make You Cry.

== Career ==
Bitter's Kiss started as a vehicle for singer/songwriter Chloe Baker to showcase her talents alongside her father. Chloe grew up in a home filled with music, with a father who maintained a studio, a guitar collection and a band. She started Bitter's Kiss as a way to document her world. Baker has publicly discussed many of her songs meanings and how they relate to her own life. Having started the project while attending High Tech, an arts academy in North Bergen, her father helped her to access the necessary resources to record and release her self-titled debut in March 2015. It rapidly received massive critical acclaim.

The project has been noted for its heavy use of music videos and other visual content. Baker released her first music video, for the song, The Rope, in March 2015. By the end of the year she had gone on to make videos for Love Won't Make You Cry and No One Will. Love Won't Make You Cry rapidly received more than 100,000 views on YouTube, meanwhile No One Will, which was shot on location in Ireland, garnered hundreds of thousands of views on Facebook. Music Times wrote of the video for No One Will, "Clearly, "No One Will" is not only the song title, but the message of the visuals featured in this video." Meanwhile, Wild Honey Pie claimed, "If you’ve ever felt the stress and depressing reality of being a teen in the suburbs, then you’ll be able to relate to Bitter's Kiss and her melancholic single “The Rope.” She was also featured on the Bolier & Relondo track Lost & Found and starred in the music video which rapidly cleared a million views on YouTube. Lost & Found reached No. 4 on the Beatport Top House Charts and #10 on the Beatport Top 100 Charts.

== Critical reception ==
While Bitter's Kiss received generally positive reviews, several had a more lukewarm take on her debut release and suggested that her youth may have played a factor in her artistic development. This was a sentiment popularized by The Big Takeover who claimed, "It’s possible to say it’s all the result of a little needed experience, but that’s what makes it so fascinating of a document, like a snapshot of a specific time and place we all go through."

Major media outlets seemed largely positive in their reception of her debut. Huffington Post wrote of her record, "Just like the teenage psyche, many of Chloe’s songs are melancholic yet hopeful, also a reflection of the duality of mankind. Though young in age, there is a mature sophistication to her lyrics that combine the struggles of young adulthood with an ageless wisdom." Young Hollywood meanwhile raved about her potential, writing, "To say that Chloe is talented is a vast understatement; even if she hadn’t written the music, her vocals alone are plenty to be a successful artist, but both of those together mean she’s probably just scratching the surface."

Some publications did not embrace Bitter's Kiss quite as much though, Elmore Magazine said of the album, "it’s a little too safe, stylistically" Contactmusic.com echoed this, giving the record a 3.5/5 rating and stating, "It will be interesting to see if she develops it or allows it to stagnate."

== Discography ==
- Bitter's Kiss (2015)
