= Above & Beyond discography =

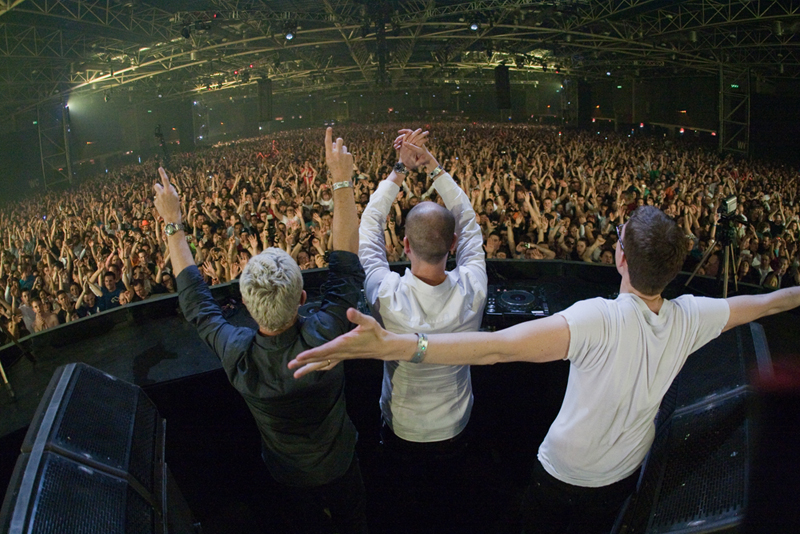
- Above & Beyond at Trance Energy, 2010.
- Studio albums: 5
- EPs: 2
- Compilation albums: 2
- Singles: 85
- Remix albums: 3
- Mix albums: 26

The discography of Above & Beyond, a British progressive trance group, consists of five studio albums, three remix albums, two compilation albums, twenty-six mix albums, two extended plays and eighty-five singles.

Above & Beyond's first artist album, Tri-State, was released in March 2006, along with the single "Alone Tonight." The album features collaborations with the likes of Zoë Johnston, Richard Bedford, and Andy Moor, known for his work with Tilt and as one-half of the duo Leama & Moor. The first single from the album, "Air for Life," was released in July 2005. In July 2008, Above & Beyond released the album Sirens of the Sea under the artist name OceanLab, one of Above & Beyond's side projects. In July 2009, they then released a remix album of Sirens of the Sea, titled Sirens of the Sea Remixed. Above & Beyond released their second album titled Group Therapy on 6 June 2011. The first single from this album was "Sun & Moon," featuring the vocals of Richard Bedford. Above & Beyond released their Acoustic album on 28 January 2014. The group's third artist album, We Are All We Need, was released on 19 January 2015. This was followed by the release of their fourth studio album, Common Ground, on 16 January 2018. The group then released Flow State on 19 July 2019, an ambient album mainly aimed towards yoga and meditative events.

== Albums ==
=== Studio albums ===
Title	Album details	Peak chart positions							
Title	Album details	UK	AUS	BEL	CAN	IRE	NLD	SWI	US
Tri-State	Released: 6 March 2006; Label: Anjunabeats; Formats: Digital download, CD	—	—	—	—	—	—	—	—
Group Therapy	Released: 6 June 2011; Label: Anjunabeats; Formats: Digital download, CD	49	56	—	—	—	—	—	163
We Are All We Need	Released: 16 January 2015; Label: Anjunabeats; Formats: Digital download, CD	12	11	59	16	94	38	61	34
Common Ground	Released: 16 January 2018; Label: Anjunabeats; Formats: Digital download, CD	41	55	111	61	—	190	—	3
Bigger Than All of Us	Released: 18 July 2025; Label: Anjunabeats; Formats: Digital download, CD, vinyl	—	—	—	—	—	—	—	—
"—" denotes a recording that did not chart or was not released.

==== As OceanLab ====
Title	Album details
Sirens of the Sea	Released: 21 July 2008; Label: Anjunabeats; Formats: Digital download, CD, vinyl

==== Acoustic albums ====
Title	Album details	Peak chart positions			
Title	Album details	UK	AUS	BEL	US
Acoustic	Released: 28 January 2014; Label: Anjunabeats; Formats: Digital download, CD, vinyl	57	—	140	70
Acoustic II	Released: 3 June 2016; Label: Anjunabeats; Formats: Digital download, CD, vinyl	52	30	130	—
"—" denotes a recording that did not chart or was not released.

==== Ambient albums ====
Title	Album details	Peak chart positions
Title	Album details	AUS
Flow State	Released: 19 July 2019; Label: Anjunabeats; Formats: Digital download, CD	— (Note: Flow State did not enter the ARIA Albums Chart, but peaked at number 15 on the ARIA Digital Album Chart.)
Flow State Meditations	Released: 11 May 2020; Label: Anjunabeats; Formats: Digital download	—
Flow State: Healing With Nature	Released: 17 June 2021; Label: Anjunabeats; Formats: Digital download	—
"—" denotes a recording that did not chart or was not released.

=== Soundtrack albums ===
Title	Album details
The Last Glaciers (Original Motion Picture Soundtrack)	Released: 22 Mar 2022; Label: Anjunabeats; Formats: Digital download

=== Remix albums ===
Title	Album details
Tri-State Remixed	Released: 19 November 2007; Label: Anjunabeats; Formats: Digital download, CD
Sirens of the Sea Remixed (as OceanLab)	Released: 8 June 2009; Label: Anjunabeats; Formats: Digital download, CD
10 Years of Group Therapy	Released: 17 December 2021; Label: Anjunabeats; Formats: Digital download, CD

=== Compilation albums ===
Title	Album details
The Club Mix Collection	Released: 21 May 2020; Label: Anjunabeats; Formats: Digital download
Title	Album details
The Club Instrumentals	Released: 15 Apr 2021; Label: Anjunabeats; Formats: Digital download

== DJ mixes ==
Anjunabeats releases

- 2003 – Anjunabeats Volume One
- 2004 – Anjunabeats Volume Two
- 2005 – Anjunabeats Volume Three
- 2006 – Anjunabeats Volume Four
- 2007 – Anjunabeats Volume Five
- 2008 – Anjunabeats Volume Six
- 2008 – Anjunabeats 100 + From Goa to Rio
- 2009 – Anjunabeats Volume 7
- 2010 – Anjunabeats Volume 8
- 2011 – 10 Years of Anjunabeats
- 2011 – Anjunabeats Volume 9
- 2013 – Anjunabeats Volume 10
- 2014 – Anjunabeats Volume 11
- 2015 – Anjunabeats Volume 12
- 2017 – Anjunabeats Volume 13
- 2018 – Acoustic – Live At The Hollywood Bowl
- 2019 – Anjunabeats Volume 14
- 2020 – Anjunabeats Volume 15
- 2021 – ABGT 450 - Deep Set - Live From London
- 2021 – ABGT 450 - Live From London
- 2022 – Anjunabeats Volume 16
- 2026 - Anjunabeats Volume 17

Anjunadeep releases

- 2009 – Anjunadeep:01
- 2025 – Anjunachill 01

Other

- 2004 – Laser-Kissed Trance (Mixmag)
- 2009 – Trance Nation (Ministry of Sound)
- 2010 – AX Music Series Volume 15 – Mixed by Above & Beyond: Utopia (Armani Exchange Music Series)
- 2011 – Cream Ibiza Sunrise (Mixmag)
- 2012 – Cream Ibiza (New State Music)
- 2012 – United Colours of Anjunabeats (Mixmag)

== Extended plays ==
List of extended plays
Title	Details
Common Ground Companion	Released: 8 February 2019; Label: Anjunabeats; Formats: Digital download
Out of Time	Released: 20 December 2019; Label: Anjunabeats; Formats: Digital download

== Singles ==
Title	Year	Peak chart positions		Album
Title	Year	UK	US Dance	Album
"Volume One" (as Anjunabeats)	2000	—	—	Non-album singles
"Disco Fans" (as Dirt Devils)	2000	—	—	Non-album singles
"The Drill" (as Dirt Devils)	2000	—	—	Non-album singles
"Different Ways" (as Free State)	2000	—	—	Non-album singles
"Release" (as Free State featuring Jeff Buckley)	2001	—	—	Non-album singles
"Tongue of God" (as Tongue of God)	2001	—	—	Non-album singles
"Razorfish" (as Tranquility Base)	2001	—	—	Non-album singles
"Clear Blue Water" (as OceanLab)	2001	48	—	Non-album singles
"Sky Falls Down" (as OceanLab)	2002	—	—	Non-album singles
"Far From In Love"	2002	—	—	Non-album singles
"Beautiful Together" (as OceanLab)	2003	—	—	Non-album singles
"Albinoni" (as Rollerball)	2003	—	—	Non-album singles
"The Storm" (as Zed-X)	2003	—	—	Non-album singles
"Music is Life" (as Dirt Devils)	2003	—	—	Non-album singles
"No One on Earth" (featuring Zoë Johnston)	2004	95	—	Non-album singles
"Surrender" (as Tranquility Base)	2004	—	—	Non-album singles
"Satellite" (as OceanLab)	2004	19	—	Sirens of the Sea Remixed
"Getting Away" (as Tranquility Base)	2005	97	—	Non-album single
"Air For Life" (with Andy Moor)	2005	—	—	Tri-State
"Alone Tonight"	2006	—	—	Tri-State
"Can't Sleep"	2006	—	—	Tri-State
"Good For Me" (featuring Zoë Johnston)	2007	—	—	Tri-State
"Home"	2007	—	—	Tri-State
"Oceanic" (as Tranquility Base)	2007	—	—	Non-album singles
"Buzz" (as Tranquility Base)	2007	—	—	Non-album singles
"Sirens of the Sea" (as OceanLab)	2008	—	—	Sirens of the Sea
"Miracle" (as OceanLab)	2008	—	—	Sirens of the Sea
"Breaking Ties" (as OceanLab)	2008	—	—	Sirens of the Sea
"On a Good Day" (as OceanLab)	2009	—	—	Sirens of the Sea
"Lonely Girl" (as OceanLab)	2009	—	—	Sirens of the Sea
"Anjunabeach"	2009	—	—	Non-album singles
"Anphonic" (with Kyau & Albert)	2010	—	—	Non-album singles
"On a Good Day (Metropolis)" (as OceanLab with Gareth Emery)	2010	—	—	Non-album singles
"Sun & Moon" (featuring Richard Bedford)	2011	71	—	Group Therapy
"Thing Called Love" (featuring Richard Bedford)	2011	—	—	Group Therapy
"You Got to Go" (featuring Zoë Johnston)	2011	—	—	Group Therapy
"Formula Rossa"	2011	—	—	Non-album single
"Every Little Beat" (featuring Richard Bedford)	2011	—	—	Group Therapy
"Love is Not Enough" (featuring Zoë Johnston)	2012	—	—	Group Therapy
"On My Way to Heaven" (featuring Richard Bedford)	2012	—	—	Group Therapy
"Alchemy" (featuring Zoë Johnston)	2012	—	—	Group Therapy
"Black Room Boy" (featuring Tony McGuiness and Richard Bedford)	2013	—	—	Group Therapy
"Walter White"	2013	—	—	Non-album singles
"Mariana Trench"	2013	—	—	Non-album singles
"Hello"	2014	—	—	We Are All We Need
"Sticky Fingers" (featuring Alex Vargas)	2014	—	—	We Are All We Need
"You Got to Believe" (with Arty featuring Zoë Johnston)	2014	—	—	Non-album single
"Blue Sky Action" (featuring Alex Vargas)	2014	—	—	We Are All We Need
"We're All We Need" (featuring Zoë Johnston)	2014	—	45	We Are All We Need
"All Over the World" (featuring Alex Vargas)	2015	—	—	We Are All We Need
"Peace of Mind" (featuring Zoë Johnston)	2015	—	—	We Are All We Need
"Counting Down the Days" (featuring Gemma Hayes)	2015	—	—	We Are All We Need
"Fly to New York" (featuring Zoë Johnston)	2015	—	—	We Are All We Need
"A.I."	2016	—	—	Non-album singles
"Another Chance" (as OceanLab)	2016	—	—	Non-album singles
"Balearic Balls"	2017	—	—	Non-album singles
"1001"	2017	—	—	Common Ground
"Alright Now" (with Justine Suissa)	2017	—	—	Common Ground
"Surge"	2017	—	—	Ghost in the Shell
"Tightrope" (featuring Marty Longstaff)	2017	—	—	Common Ground
"My Own Hymn" (featuring Zoë Johnston)	2017	—	—	Common Ground
"Northern Soul" (featuring Richard Bedford)	2017	—	42	Common Ground
"Always" (featuring Zoë Johnston)	2018	—	—	Common Ground
"Cold Feet" (with Justine Suissa)	2018	—	—	Common Ground
"Red Rocks"	2018	—	—	Non-album singles
"Rocket Science"	2018	—	—	Non-album singles
"Long Way From Home" (with Spencer Brown featuring Rbbts)	2018	—	—	Non-album singles
"Flying By Candlelight" (featuring Marty Longstaff)	2019	—	—	Common Ground Companion EP
"Distorted Truth"	2019	—	—	Common Ground Companion EP
"Show Me Love" (with Armin van Buuren)	2019	—	36	Balance
"Sahara Love" (featuring Zoë Johnston)	2019	—	—	Common Ground
"There's Only You" (featuring Zoë Johnston)	2019	—	—	Common Ground Companion EP
"See the End" (with Seven Lions featuring Opposite The Other)	2019	—	49	Non-album single
"Anjunafamily"	2019	—	—	Anjunabeats Volume 14
"Hideaway"	2019	—	—	Anjunabeats Volume 14
"Waltz"	2019	—	—	Non-album singles
"Another Angel"	2019	—	—	Non-album singles
"Blue Monday"	2020	—	39	Non-album singles
"Bittersweet & Blue" (featuring Richard Bedford)	2020	—	—	Common Ground
"Reverie" (featuring Zoë Johnston)	2020	—	—	Non-album single
"Jam"	2020	—	—	Anjunabeats Volume 15
"Falling" (featuring Zoë Johnston)	2020	—	—	Non-album single
"I Saw Good"	2020	—	—	Anjunabeats Volume 15
"Diving Out of Love"	2020	—	—	Anjunabeats Volume 15
"Crash"	2020	—	—	Anjunabeats Volume 15
"Almost Home" (with Justine Suissa)	2021	—	—	Bigger Than All Of Us
"Screwdriver"	2021	—	—	Anjunabeats Volume 16
"Sun & Moon (10 Years Later Mix)"	2021	—	—	Non-album singles
"Always Do" (with Mat Zo)	2022	—	—	Non-album singles
"Projection"	2022	—	—	Anjunabeats Volume 16
"Chains" (featuring Marty Longstaff)	2022	—	—	Anjunabeats Volume 16
"Morning in Deira" / "Time Heals"	2022	—	—	Non-album singles
"With Your Hope (Maor Levi Remix)" (featuring Richard Bedford)	2022	—	—	Non-album singles
"Angry JP8"	2023	—	—	Tranquility Base Vol. 1
"500"	2023	—	—	Tranquility Base Vol. 1
"Over Now" (with Seven Lions featuring Opposite The Other)	2023	—	—	Bigger Than All Of Us
"Spin Off"	2023	—	—	Tranquility Base Vol. 1
"Satellite (Above & Beyond's 2023 Progressive Mix)"	2023	—	—	Non-album single
"Crazy Love" (featuring Zoë Johnston)	2024	—	—	Bigger Than All Of Us
"If You Love Me"	2024	—	—	Bigger Than All Of Us
"Shall We Begin"	2025	—	—	Non-album single
"Quicksand (Don't Go)" (with Zoë Johnston)	2025	—	—	Bigger Than All Of Us
"Letting Go" (with Malou)	2025	—	—	Bigger Than All Of Us
"Bigger Than All Of Us" (with Justine Suissa)	2025	—	—	Bigger Than All Of Us
"Feel The Vibe"	2026	—	—	Anjunabeats Volume 17
"Major Drop"	2026	—	—	Anjunabeats Volume 17
"Homecoming (Tim Green Remix)"	2026	—	—	Non-album single
"When I Look In Your Eyes" (with Justine Suissa)	2026	—	—	Anjunabeats Volume 17
"When You Believe" (with Victoria Horn)	2026	—	—	Bigger Than All Of Us
"—" denotes a recording that did not chart or was not released.

== Other certified songs ==
Title	Year	Certification	Album
"Don't Leave"	2019	RIAA: Gold	Flow State

== Remixes ==
as Above & Beyond

- 2000 – Chakra – Home (Above & Beyond Mix)
- 2000 – Aurora – Ordinary World (Above & Beyond Remix)
- 2000 – Fragma – Everytime You Need Me (Above & Beyond Remix)
- 2000 – Adamski – In The City (Above & Beyond Mix)
- 2001 – OceanLab – Clear Blue Water (Above and Beyond Progressive Mix)
- 2001 – Tranquility Base – Razorfish (Above & Beyond Bangin Mix)
- 2001 – Armin van Buuren presents Perpetuous Dreamer – The Sound Of Goodbye (Above & Beyond Remix)
- 2001 – Anjunabeats – Volume One (Above & Beyond Remix)
- 2001 – Ayumi Hamasaki – M (Above & Beyond Remix)
- 2001 – The Mystery – Mystery (Above & Beyond Remix)
- 2001 – Three Drives On A Vinyl – Sunset On Ibiza (Above & Beyond Remix)
- 2001 – Dario G – Dream To Me (Above & Beyond Mix)
- 2001 – Delerium – Underwater (Above & Beyond's 21st Century Mix)
- 2001 – Madonna – What It Feels Like For A Girl (Above & Beyond 12" Club Mix)
- 2002 – Catch – Walk On Water (Above & Beyond Remix)
- 2002 – Every Little Thing – Face The Change (Dirt Devils and Above & Beyond Remix)
- 2002 – Vivian Green – Emotional Rollercoaster (Above & Beyond Mix)
- 2003 – Billie Ray Martin – Honey (Above & Beyond Club Mix)
- 2003 – Rollerball – Albinoni (Above & Beyond Remix)
- 2003 – Motorcycle – As The Rush Comes (Above & Beyond's Dynaglide Mix)
- 2003 – Tomcraft – Loneliness (Above & Beyond Remix)
- 2003 – Exile – Your Eyes Only (Aimai Naboku Rinkan) (Above & Beyond Mix)
- 2003 – Matt Hardwick and Smith & Pledger – Day One (Above & Beyond's Big Room Mix)
- 2003 – Rusch & Murray – Epic (Above & Beyond Remix)
- 2003 – Madonna – Nobody Knows Me (Above & Beyond 12" Mix)
- 2003 – OceanLab – Satellite (Original Above & Beyond Mix)
- 2004 – Britney Spears – Everytime (Above & Beyond Club Mix)
- 2004 – Chakra – I Am (Above & Beyond Mix)
- 2004 – Dido – Sand In My Shoes (Above & Beyond's UV Mix)
- 2004 – Delerium – Silence (Above & Beyond's 21st Century Remix)
- 2005 – Ferry Corsten and Shelley Harland – Holding On (Above & Beyond Remix)
- 2006 – Cara Dillon and 2Devine – Black Is The Colour (Above & Beyond's Divine Intervention Remix)
- 2007 – Adam Nickey – Never Gone (Original Mix) (Above & Beyond Respray)
- 2007 – DT8 Project – Destination (Above & Beyond Remix)
- 2007 – Purple Mood – One Night In Tokyo (Above & Beyond Remix)
- 2008 – Radiohead – Reckoner (Above & Beyond Remix)
- 2008 – OceanLab – Sirens Of The Sea (Above & Beyond Club Mix)
- 2008 – OceanLab – Miracle (Above & Beyond Club Mix)
- 2009 – Dirty Vegas – Tonight (Above & Beyond Remix)
- 2010 – Miguel Bose – Por Ti (Above & Beyond Remix)
- 2012 – Kaskade featuring Skylar Grey – Room For Happiness (Above & Beyond Remix)
- 2014 – Faithless – Salva Mea 2.0 (Above & Beyond Remix)
- 2015 – Same K – For You (Above & Beyond Edit)
- 2015 – Jean-Michel Jarre and Tangerine Dream – Zero Gravity (Above & Beyond Remix)
- 2016 – Moby – Porcelain (Above & Beyond Remix)
- 2017 – Above & Beyond featuring Zoë Johnston – No One On Earth (Gabriel & Dresden Remix) [Above & Beyond Respray]
- 2017 – Gabriel & Dresden featuring Sub Teal – This Love Kills Me (Gabriel & Dresden Club Mix – Above & Beyond Respray)
- 2019 – Above & Beyond – Alone Tonight (Above & Beyond's Gorge Update)
- 2020 – Fatum, Genix, Jaytech and Judah – We're All In This Together (Above & Beyond Respray)

as Dirt Devils

- 2000 – Free State – Different Ways (Dirt Devils Remix)
- 2000 – The Croydon Dub Heads – Your Lying (Dirt Devils Remix)
- 2001 – Free State – Release (Dirt Devils Remix)
- 2001 – Anjunabeats – Volume One (Free State and Dirt Devils Remix)
- 2002 – Modulation – Darkstar (Dirt Devils Remix)
- 2002 – Every Little Thing – Face The Change (Dirt Devils and Above & Beyond Remix)
- 2002 – Day After Tomorrow – Faraway (Dirt Devils 12" Mix)
- 2002 – Matt Cassar presents Most Wanted – Seven Days And One Week (Dirt Devils Mix)
- 2002 – Future Breeze – Temple Of Dreams (Dirt Devils Remix)
- 2003 – Ayumi Hamasaki – Voyage (Dirt Devils Remix)

as Free State

- 2000 – 4 Strings – Day Time (Free State Vocal Mix)
- 2000 – Icebreaker International – Port of Yokohama (The Free State YFZ Mix)
- 2000 – The Croydon Dub Heads – Your Lying (Free State Remix)
- 2001 – Anjunabeats – Volume One (Free State and Dirt Devils Remix)

as "OceanLab"

- 2001 – Teaser – When Love Breaks Down (OceanLab Mix)
- 2002 – Ascension – For a Lifetime (OceanLab Remix)
