= Arty discography =

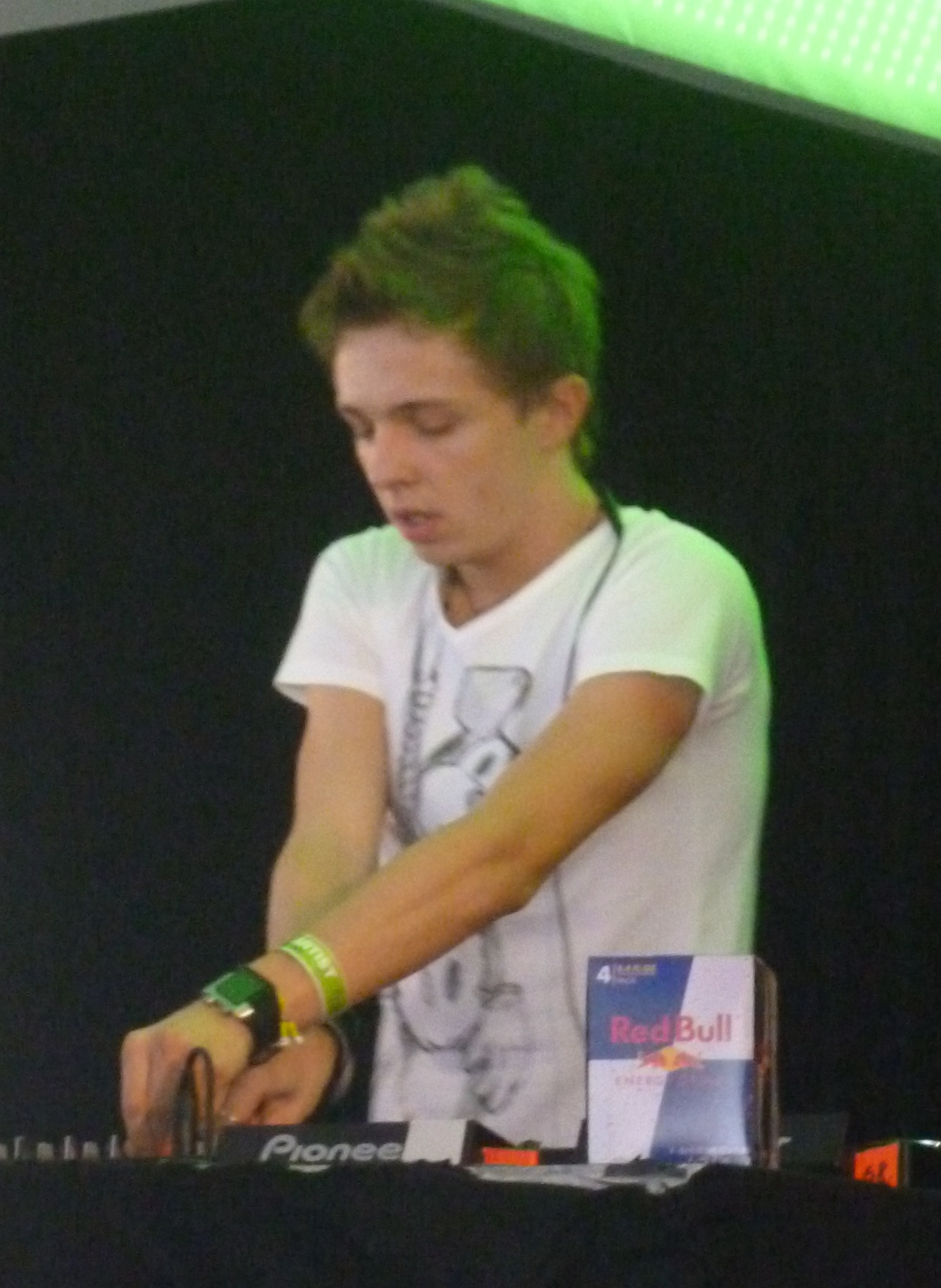
- Arty at Electric Zoo Festival, 2011
- Studio albums: 1
- Singles: 53
- Music videos: 9
- Compilation albums: 1
- Extended plays: 4
- Remixes: 52

This is the discography for Russian electronic music producer and DJ Arty, also known as Artem Stoliarov. Arty has released one studio album and forty-eight singles under his main name, and ten singles under his trance alias Alpha 9. In October 2015, Arty released his debut album Glorious which contained singles "Up All Night", "Stronger", and "Braver Love".

== Albums ==
=== Studio albums ===
Title	Album details	Charts
Title	Album details	US Dance
Glorious	Released: October 9, 2015; Label: Insomniac Records, Interscope; Formats: Digital download	14

=== Compilation albums ===
Title	Album details
Anjunabeats Worldwide 03 (with Daniel Kandi)	Released: April 11, 2011; Label: Anjunabeats; Formats: CD, digital download

== Extended plays ==
=== As Arty ===
Title	Details	Track listing
Inside of Me / Flip Flop (with Misha Kitone)	Release date: February 14, 2009; Label: Drizzly Music	No. / Title / Length; 1. / "Inside of Me" / 7:23; 2. / "Flip Flop" / 7:34
Vanilla Sky	Release date: June 8, 2009; Label: Enhanced Progressive	No. / Title / Length; 1. / "Vanilla Sky" / 7:40; 2. / "Love Inside Out" / 6:53; 3. / "Absynthe" / 6:47
Sunset / Day After Day	Release date: August 28, 2009; Label: Shah-Music Digital	No. / Title / Length; 1. / "Sunset" / 7:03; 2. / "Day After Day" / 9:18
Gentle Touch / Logic Symphony	Release date: October 26, 2009; Label: Enhanced Progressive	No. / Title / Length; 1. / "Gentle Touch" / 7:21; 2. / "Logic Symphony" / 6:54
From Russia with Love Vol. 1	Release date: April 17, 2020; Label: Armada Music	No. / Title / Length; 1. / "Outburst (with Stellz)" / 3:04; 2. / "Freedom (with Muvy)" / 3:33; 3. / "Redline (with Kitone)" / 3:10; 4. / "Strings ID (with NK)" / 3:25
From Russia with Love Vol. 2	Release date: July 17, 2020; Label: Armada Music	No. / Title / Length; 1. / "Who Am I (with NK)" / 4:18; 2. / "Prayer (with NK)" / 4:00; 3. / "Horyzon" / 3:19; 4. / "This Is Anthem" / 3:45
From Russia with Love Vol. 3	Release date: October 16, 2020; Label: Armada Music	No. / Title / Length; 1. / "It Won't Stop Me (with NK)" / 4:00; 2. / "Too Far Gone (with NK)" / 3:28; 3. / "Run Away (with Vion Konger)" / 2:49; 4. / "Say My Name" / 3:15

=== As Alpha 9 ===
Title
Stellar
Details
- Release date: 4 December 2020
- Label: Anjunabeats
Track listing

No.	Title	Length
1.	"Stellar"	3:43
2.	"Time Traveller"	4:08
3.	"Friend"	3:12

== Singles ==
=== As lead artist ===
==== As Arty ====
Title	Year	Peak chart positions					Album
Title	Year	US Dance	US Mix	BEL (Fl)	NED	NL	Album
"Get On"	2009	—	—	—	—	—	Non-album singles
"Rush"	2010	—	—	—	—	—	Non-album singles
"Hope"	2010	—	—	—	—	—	Non-album singles
"Twilight Tonight"	2010	—	—	—	—	—	Non-album singles
"The Wonder"	2010	—	—	—	—	—	Non-album singles
"Zara"	2011	—	—	—	—	—	Non-album singles
"Rebound" (with Mat Zo)	2011	—	—	—	—	—	Anjunabeats Presents Mat Zo 01
"Around the World"	2011	—	—	—	—	—	Non-album singles
"Kate"	2011	—	—	—	89	13	Non-album singles
"The Wall" (featuring Tania Zygar)	2011	—	—	—	—	—	Anjunabeats Worldwide 03
"Mozart" (with Mat Zo)	2011	—	—	—	—	—	Non-album single
"Trio" (with Matisse & Sadko)	2012	—	—	—	—	—	Non-album single
"Open Space"	2012	—	—	—	—	—	Non-album single
"Must Be The Love" (with Nadia Ali and BT)	2012	—	—	—	—	—	A Song Across Wires
"Nehalennia" (with Armin van Buuren)	2013	—	—	—	—	—	Armin Anthems Top 100
"Together We Are" (featuring Chris James)	2013	—	21	—	—	9	Non-album singles
"Grand Finale" (featuring Fiora)	2013	—	—	—	—	—	Non-album singles
"It's All Relative" (featuring Jenson Vaughan)	2013	—	—	—	—	—	Non-album singles
"Flashback"	2013	—	—	—	—	—	Non-album singles
"Riot" (with Matisse & Sadko)	2013	—	—	—	—	—	Non-album singles
"Up All Night" (featuring Angel Taylor)	2014	41	9	—	—	—	Glorious
"You Got to Believe" (Above & Beyond vs. ARTY featuring Zoë Johnston)^{1}	2014	—	—	—	—	—	Non-album singles
"Night Like This"	2014	—	—	—	—	—	Non-album singles
"When I See You"^{2}	2014	—	—	—	—	—	Non-album singles
"Stronger" (featuring Ray Dalton)	2015	—	—	—	—	—	Glorious
"Braver Love" (featuring Conrad Sewell)	2015	—	—	—	—	—	Glorious
"Glorious" (featuring Blondfire)	2015	—	—	—	—	—	Glorious
"Waste Your Time" (featuring Clarence Coffee Jr.)	2015	—	—	—	—	—	Glorious
"Patriots"	2016	—	—	—	—	—	Non-album singles
"Bloodfire"	2016	—	—	—	—	—	Non-album singles
"Distorted Love"	2016	—	—	—	—	—	Non-album singles
"Follow The Light" (with Andrew Bayer)	2016	—	—	—	—	—	Anjunabeats Worldwide 06
"Falling Down" (featuring Maty Noyes)	2017	—	—	—	—	—	Non-album singles
"Idea Of You" (featuring Eric Nam)	2017	—	—	—	—	—	Non-album singles
"Supposed to Be" (featuring Coyle Girelli)	2017	—	—	—	—	—	Non-album singles
"Sunrise" (featuring April Bender)	2018	—	4	—	—	—	Non-album singles
"Rain"	2018	—	—	—	—	—	Non-album singles
"Couldn't Be Better"	2018	—	—	—	—	—	Non-album singles
"Tim"	2018	—	—	—	—	—	Non-album singles
"Perfect Strangers"	2018	—	—	—	—	—	Non-album singles
"Never Letting Go" (with Audien)	2018	—	—	—	—	—	Non-album singles
"Save Me Tonight"	2019	26	1	30	—	—	Non-album singles
"Avalanche"	2019	—	—	—	—	—	Non-album singles
"Sunshine"	2019	—	—	—	—	—	Non-album singles
"Find You"	2019	—	—	—	—	—	Non-album singles
"Daydreams" (featuring Cimo Fränkel)	2019	—	—	—	—	—	Non-album singles
"You're Not Alone" (featuring Griff Clawson)	2020	—	—	—	—	—	Non-album singles
"Outburst" (with Stellz)	2020	—	—	—	—	—	From Russia With Love EP
"Freedom" (with Stellz)	2020	—	—	—	—	—	From Russia With Love EP
"Redline" (with Kitone)	2020	—	—	—	—	—	From Russia With Love Vol. 1
"Kingdom" (featuring Conrad Sewell)	2020	—	—	—	—	—	Non-album single
"Who Am I" (with NK)	2020	—	—	—	—	—	From Russia With Love Vol. 2
"Prayer" (with NK)	2020	—	—	—	—	—	From Russia With Love Vol. 2
"Horyzon"	2020	—	1	—	—	—	From Russia With Love Vol. 2
"Craving" (with Audien featuring Ellee Duke)	2020	—	—	—	—	—	Non-album single
"It Won't Stop Me" (with NK)	2020	—	—	—	—	—	From Russia With Love Vol. 3
"Too Far Gone" (with NK)	2020	—	—	—	—	—	From Russia With Love Vol. 3
"Run Away" (with Vion Konger)	2020	—	—	—	—	—	From Russia With Love Vol. 3
"Say My Name"	2020	—	—	—	—	—	From Russia With Love Vol. 3
"Take Your Time"	2021	—	—	—	—	—	Non-album singles
"One Night Away"	2021	—	—	—	—	—	Non-album singles
"Fight For"	2021	—	—	—	—	—	Non-album singles
"Brighter Side"	2021	—	—	—	—	—	Non-album singles
"Live For"	2021	—	—	—	—	—	Non-album singles
"Those Eyes" (featuring Griff Clawson)	2021	—	—	—	—	—	Non-album singles
"Who Do You Love" (featuring Rozzi)	2022	—	—	—	—	—	Non-album singles
"Where Have You Been" (with Vikkstar featuring Annie Schindel)	2026	—	—	—	—	—	Non-album singles
"Sky" (with Frank Walker featuring Zeke Finn)	2026	—	—	—	—	—	Oasis
"Lost in the Crowd" (with Laidback Luke and James Hersey)	2026	—	—	—	—	—	Non-album single
"—" denotes a recording that did not chart or was not released in that territory.

Notes

- Note 1: Mashup of singles "You Got To Go" and "Believe In Me".
- Note 2: This is the "Original Mix", not the "Alesso Mix". The original single was debuted on Refune Radio 005.

==== As Alpha 9 ====
Title	Year
"Bliss"	2009
"Come Home"	2010
"The Night Is Ours"	2017
"Only Good Mistake" (with Koven)	2017
"Higher Place"	2017
"Skin"	2017
"Lily"	2017
"Blossom"	2017
"Burning Heart"	2017
"You and I"	2018
"No Going Back" (with Spencer Brown)	2018
"All We Need"	2018
"Sleepwalker"	2018
"Azzura"	2018
"Before the Dawn" (featuring Kameron Alexander)	2019
"Dreams"	2020
"All That I Can"	2020
"Tell Me"	2020
"Everywhere I Go"	2020

=== As featured artist ===
Title	Year	Peak chart positions		Album
Title	Year	BEL (Vl)	AUT	Album
"The Ocean" (Paul van Dyk featuring Arty)	2012	56	106	Evolution
"The Sun After Heartbreak" (Paul van Dyk featuring Sue McLaren and Arty)	2012	—	—	Evolution

=== Promotional singles ===
Year	Track name	Album
2011	"Bright Days"	Digitally Enhanced Volume Four
2012	"The Slide"	N/A
2013	"Believe In Me"	Anjunabeats Volume 10

== Remixes ==
=== As Arty ===
Year	Track name	Original Artist	Label
2009	"Imagine" (Arty Remix)	Incognet	Digital Motion
2009	"That One Moment" (Arty Remix)	Anhken and Adrian	Eternity Recordings
2009	"Restless" (Arty Remix)	Perpetual (featuring Tiff Lacey)	Enhanced Progressive
2009	"Connected" (Arty Remix)	Vosk (featuring Esmayne)	Black Hole Recordings
2009	"Laika" (Arty Remix)	Solarity	Enhanced Progressive
2010	"That Same Song Again" (Arty Remix)	Danilo Ercole	Armada Music
2010	"Trapeze" (Arty Remix)	Ferry Tayle and Static Blue	Enhanced Recordings
2010	"Utopia" (Arty Remix)	Tritonal	Enhanced Recordings
2010	"Fat Yet Horny" (Arty Remix)	Carlos Almeida	Alter Ego Progressive
2010	"Alone" (Arty Remix)	Michael Angelo and Solo (featuring Denise Rivera)	Songbird
2010	"Absolute Reality" (Arty Remix)	Reverse	Vandit
2010	"Tinctures" (Arty Remix)	Alex Pich	Perceptive Recordings
2010	"She Gave Happiness" (Arty Remix)	D-Mad	Enhanced Progressive
2010	"Let the Light Shine In 2010" (Arty Remix)	Darren Tate and Jono Grant	Armada Music
2010	"Blossom" (Arty Remix)	Mike Foyle (presents Statika)	Coldharbour Recordings
2010	"We Won't Forget" (Arty Remix)	Robert Nickson	A State of Trance
2010	"Don't Surrender" (Arty Remix)	Sequentia	Afterglow
2010	"Anphonic" (Arty Remix)	Above & Beyond and Kyau & Albert	Anjunabeats
2010	"F.A.V." (Arty Remix)	Cosmic Gate	Black Hole Recordings
2010	"Away From Here" (Arty Remix)	Sneijder	Vandit
2010	"This Night" (Arty Remix)	Filo & Peri (featuring Audrey Gallagher)	Vandit
2010	"Back to Earth" (Arty Remix)	Cosmic Gate	Black Hole Recordings
2011	"Punk" (Arty Rock-n-Rolla Mix)	Ferry Corsten	Flashover Recordings
2011	"Hate is the Killer" (Arty Remix)	Moonbeam (featuring Avis Vox)	Moonbeam Digital
2011	"Daddyrock" (Arty Remix)	Sander van Doorn	Doorn Records
2011	"The World Doesn't Know" (Arty Remix)	Tilt	Lost Language
2011	"Synapse Dynamics" (Arty Remix)	Mat Zo	Anjunabeats
2011	"Are You Fine?" (Arty Remix)	Kyau & Albert	Euphonic
2011	"Lost It All" (Arty Remix)	Topher Jones (featuring Jess Underdown, James Bowers)	Ultra Records
2011	"We Came Together" (Arty Remix)	Paul van Dyk (featuring Sue McLaren)	Vandit
2012	"Walking Alone" (Arty Remix)	Dirty South and Those Usual Suspects	Phazing Records
2012	"Spectrum" (Arty Remix)	Zedd (featuring Matthew Koma)	Interscope Records
2013	"Rock Your Body Rock" (Arty Rock-N-Rolla Remix)	Ferry Corsten	Flashover Recordings
2014	"Hey Now" (Arty Remix)	London Grammar	Ministry of Sound
2014	"Lionhearted" (Arty Remix)	Porter Robinson (featuring Urban Cone)	Astralwerks
2014	"I Lived" (Arty Remix)	OneRepublic	Interscope Records
2015	"Hurricane" (Arty Remix)	Halsey	Astralwerks
2015	"Let Go" (Arty and Krystal Klear Rework)	RAC (featuring Kele & MNDR)	Interscope Records
2015	"Bloodstream" (Arty Remix)	Ed Sheeran and Rudimental	Atlantic Records
2015	"King" (Arty Remix)	Years & Years	Polydor
2015	"Peace of Mind" (Arty Remix)	Above & Beyond (featuring Zoë Johnston)	Anjunabeats
2015	"Ocean" (Arty Remix)	Lauren Aquilina	Island Records
2015	"Kate (2015 Remix)"	Arty	Anjunabeats
2016	"Waiting For So Long" (Arty Remix)	Axwell	Axtone Records
2016	"Worlds Collide" (Arty Remix)	Warsongs	Riot Games
2016	"Is It Love" (Arty Remix)	3lau	Blume Music
2016	"How To Love" (Arty Remix)	Cash Cash (featuring Sofia Reyes)	Big Beat Records
2016	"Embrace" (Arty Remix)	Armin Van Buuren (featuring Eric Vloeimans)	Armada Music
2016	"Porcelain" (Arty Remix)	Moby	Anjunabeats
2017	"Hotel" (Arty Remix)	Kita Alexander	Atlantic Records
2018	"Would You Ever" (Arty Remix)	Skrillex (featuring Poo Bear)	Owsla
2018	"Chateau" (Arty Remix)	Angus & Julia Stone	Nettwork Music Group
2018	"Erase" (Arty Remix)	FRND	Crooked Paintings
2018	"Couldn't Be Better" (Arty and Vion Konger Remix)	Arty	Armada Music
2019	"There For You" (Arty Remix)	Gorgon City and MK	Universal Music
2020	"Let Me Take You There" (Arty Remix)	Max Styler (featuring Laura White)	Dim Mak Records
2020	"ILY (I Love You Baby)" (Arty Remix)	Surf Mesa (featuring Emilee)	UMG Recordings
2021	"So What" (Arty Remix)	Louis The Child (featuring Arizona)	Interscope Records
2021	"Northern Lights" (Arty Remix)	Janieck	Armada Music

=== As Alpha 9 ===
Year	Track name	Original Artist	Record label
2018	"Dreamer"	Axwell Λ Ingrosso (featuring Trevor Guthrie)	Refune Music / Virgin EMI Records
2018	"My Own Hymn"	Above & Beyond (featuring Zoë Johnston)	Anjunabeats
2018	"Atlas"	Faux Tales	The Arcadium / Melofaktur UG / Universal Music AB
2018	"Shivers"	Armin van Buuren (featuring Susana)	Armind
2019	"Empty Streets"	Late Night Alumni	Ride Recordings
2019	"Never Be the Same"	Tritonal (featuring Rosie Darling)	Enhanced Music
2020	"No Warning Lights"	BT and Emma Hewitt	Black Hole Recordings
2021	"Good For Me"	Above & Beyond (featuring Zoë Johnston)	Anjunabeats

== Music videos ==
=== As lead artist ===
List of music videos as lead artist, showing year released
Title	Year
"Mozart" (with Mat Zo)	2011
"Must Be The Love" (with Nadia Ali and BT)	2013
"Together We Are" (featuring Chris James)	2013
"It's All Relative" (featuring Jenson Vaughan)	2013
"Flashback"	2013
"RIOT"	2013
"Up All Night" (featuring Angel Taylor)	2014

=== As featured artist ===
List of music videos as lead artist, showing year released
Title	Year
"The Ocean" (Paul van Dyk featuring Arty)	2012
"The Sun After Heartbreak" (Paul van Dyk featuring Sue McLaren and Arty)	2012
"I Lived" (OneRepublic) [Arty Remix]	2014
