= We Are All We Need =

Studio album by Above & Beyond
- Released: 16 January 2015
- Recorded: 2014
- Genres: Progressive house; progressive trance
- Label: Anjunabeats
- Producers: Above & Beyond, Andrew Bayer, Zoë Johnston, Justine Suissa, Alex Vargas

Above & Beyond chronology
Acoustic (2014)	We Are All We Need (2015)	Acoustic II (2016)

Singles from We Are All We Need
- 1. "Hello" Released: 24 March 2014; 2. "Sticky Fingers" Released: 19 May 2014; 3. "Blue Sky Action" Released: 21 July 2014; 4. "We're All We Need" Released: 18 October 2014; 5. "All Over the World" Released: 15 March 2015; 6. "Peace of Mind" Released: 1 June 2015; 7. "Counting Down the Days" Released: 10 July 2015; 8. "Fly to New York" Released: 4 September 2015

We Are All We Need is the third studio album by British progressive trance group Above & Beyond. It was released on 16 January 2015 by Anjunabeats. The album is their first studio album to feature new material since Group Therapy (2011). It is the first album released under the name Above & Beyond not to feature collaborations with British singer-songwriter Richard Bedford. However it features a track with Justine Suissa, the group's longtime collaborator on the OceanLab project.

== Critical reception ==
Professional ratings
Review scores
Source	Rating
The Guardian	2/5 stars
Music Is My Oxygen	3/5 stars
The Up Coming	2/5 stars
We Got This Covered	4/5 stars

We Are All We Need received generally positive reception from music critics. Matt Joseph from We Got This Covered gave the album a 4/5 rating, stating that the album's "catchy hooks, angelic vocals and club ready anthems" added to the group's already impressing discography. Krystal Spence from Your EDM compared We Are All We Need to Above & Beyond's previous album, Group Therapy, stating that the former was "much more uplifting" than its predecessor. Krystal also praised the group for continuing their tradition of producing tracks which are "easy to learn", allowing listeners to effortlessly sing along with the tracks. inthemix's Angus Paterson noted the focus of club-based tracks on the record, and stated that the album "ain’t something that will please those enthused with the deeper, more progressive sounds heard on their Tri-State debut". He went on by writing that although there was less of a consistent theme which drew Group Therapy together, the record managed to be the "most polished album yet; functioning both as A-grade pop music, and mass-appeal club music with soul."

In a mixed review, Jon O'Brien from Music Is My Oxygen described the album as packing with "skyscraping choruses, uplifting synth hooks and Balearic beats", but criticized the track "Blue Sky Action" for being a generic attempt at copying the success of Swedish House Mafia's dance-pop sound and stated that "We Are All We Need delivers little you haven’t heard before". Lanre Bakare from The Guardian and Jessica Wall from The Up Coming both gave the album a 2/5 rating, with Bakare calling We Are All We Need an "overwrought, nigh-on comical take on dance music". Wall dubbed the record as "just a collection of songs", writing that there is no sense of journey and aesthetic amongst its tracks as the record progresses.

== Commercial performance ==
The album debuted at number 12 on the UK Albums Chart, becoming the group's highest-charting album. In the United States, We Are All We Need debuted at number 34 on the Billboard 200, becoming the group's highest-charting album. The album also debuted at number one on the Dance/Electronic Albums chart. It sold 14,000 copies in its first week in the US, the group's biggest first-week sales.

== Track listing ==
No.	Title	Writer(s)	Producer(s)	Length
1.	"Quieter Is Louder"	Jono Grant; Tony McGuinness; Paavo Siljamäki	Above & Beyond; Andrew Bayer^{[a]}	1:57
2.	"We're All We Need" (featuring Zoë Johnston)	Grant; McGuinness; Siljamäki; Zoë Johnston	Above & Beyond; Johnston; Bayer^{[a]}	4:22
3.	"Blue Sky Action" (featuring Alex Vargas)	Grant; McGuinness; Siljamäki; Bayer	Above & Beyond; Bayer	4:44
4.	"Peace of Mind" (featuring Zoë Johnston)	Grant; McGuinness; Siljamäki; Bayer; Johnston	Above & Beyond; Bayer; Johnston	4:31
5.	"Counting Down the Days" (featuring Gemma Hayes)	Grant; McGuinness; Siljamäki; Victoria Horn	Above & Beyond; Bayer^{[a]}	4:48
6.	"Sticky Fingers" (featuring Alex Vargas)	Grant; McGuinness; Siljamäki; Bayer	Above & Beyond; Bayer	3:29
7.	"Hello"	Grant; McGuinness; Siljamäki; Bayer	Above & Beyond; Bayer	4:05
8.	"Little Something" (featuring Justine Suissa)	Grant; McGuinness; Siljamäki; Justine Suissa	Above & Beyond; Suissa; Bayer^{[a]}	5:11
9.	"All Over the World" (featuring Alex Vargas)	Grant; McGuinness; Siljamäki; Bayer; Alex Vargas	Above & Beyond; Bayer; Vargas	4:46
10.	"Fly to New York" (featuring Zoë Johnston)	Grant; McGuinness; Siljamäki; Bayer; Johnston	Above & Beyond; Bayer; Johnston	5:21
11.	"Making Plans" (featuring Alex Vargas)	Grant; McGuinness; Siljamäki	Above & Beyond; Bayer^{[a]}	5:04
12.	"Out of Time"	Grant; McGuinness; Siljamäki; Bayer	Above & Beyond; Bayer^{[a]}	4:12
13.	"Excuses"	Grant; McGuinness; Siljamäki	Above & Beyond; Bayer	5:45
14.	"Save Me" (featuring Zoë Johnston)	Grant; McGuinness; Siljamäki; Johnston	Above & Beyond; Bayer^{[a]}	4:55
15.	"Sink the Lighthouse" (featuring Alex Vargas)	Grant; McGuinness; Siljamäki; Vargas	Above & Beyond; Bayer^{[a]}	4:12
16.	"Treasure" (featuring Zoë Johnston)	Grant; McGuinness; Siljamäki; Johnston	Above & Beyond; Bayer	3:46

Notes

- ^{^[a]} signifies an additional producer

== Charts ==
=== Weekly charts ===
Chart (2015)	Peak position
Australian Albums (ARIA)	11
Belgian Albums (Ultratop Flanders)	59
Belgian Albums (Ultratop Wallonia)	100
Canadian Albums (Billboard)	16
Dutch Albums (Album Top 100)	38
Irish Albums (IRMA)	94
Polish Albums (ZPAV)	37
Scottish Albums (Official Charts)	11
Swiss Albums (Schweizer Hitparade)	61
UK Albums (Official Charts)	12
UK Album Downloads (Official Charts)	13
UK Dance Albums (Official Charts)	2
US Billboard 200	34
US Top Dance Albums (Billboard)	1
US Digital Albums (Billboard)	12
US Independent Albums (Billboard)	5

=== Year-end charts ===
Chart (2015)	Position
US Top Dance/Electronic Albums (Billboard)	20

== Release history ==
Country	Date	Format(s)	Label
Australia	16 January 2015	CD; digital download	Anjunabeats, Central Station
Germany	16 January 2015	CD; digital download	Anjunabeats
Ireland	16 January 2015	CD; digital download	Anjunabeats
United Kingdom	19 January 2015	CD; digital download	Anjunabeats
United States	20 January 2015	CD; digital download	Ultra Records
