= Trance Nation – Mixed by Above & Beyond =

Trance Nation - Mixed by Above & Beyond

Compilation album by Above & Beyond
- Released: 27 July 2009
- Genre: Trance, progressive trance, progressive house
- Label: Ministry of Sound

Trance Nation – Mixed by Above & Beyond is a compilation album in the famous Trance Nation compilation series released by Ministry of Sound. It is mixed and compiled by British Trance DJs Above & Beyond and released on 27 July 2009.

The digital download version was released on 26 July 2009 and contains most of the individual songs listed, as well as the full continuous mixes for each CD.

== Track listing ==
Disc 1

1. Passenger 10 - Mikado (DJ Tatana Dub)
2. Andrew Bennett - Break Away (Martin Roth NuStyle Dub Mix) [1]
3. Marco V - Unprepared
4. Stoneface & Terminal - Santiago
5. OceanLab - Secret (Andrew Bayer Remix) [1]
6. Sunny Lax - Reborn [1]
7. Josh Gabriel presents Winter Kills - Deep Down [1]
8. Firestorm presents Coll & Tolland - Redemption (Cressida Remix)
9. Matt Cassar - 7 Days & One Week (Myon & Shane 54 Remix Edit) [1]
10. Airplay 47 - Be Free (Mat Zo Remix)
11. Cosmic Gate - Sign Of The Times (Markus Schulz Mix)
12. Matan Zohar - First Glance
13. Airbase featuring Floria Ambra - Interfere
14. Carl B & Static Blue - Sunstruck (JPL Remix)

Disc 2

1. Mat Zo - 24 Hours
2. Lange & Andy Moor - Stadium Four [1]
3. Ronski Speed featuring Mque - Are You? (Club Dub)
4. Gareth Emery - Exposure
5. OceanLab - Ashes (Oliver Smith Remix) [1]
6. Saints & Sinners - Peace (Breakfast Mix) [1]
7. Cold Blue - Fever
8. Nitrous Oxide - Magenta [1]
9. Mike Koglin - The Silence (Prospekt Remix)
10. Activa presents Solar Movement - Eclipse [1]
11. OceanLab - On A Good Day (Above & Beyond Club Mix) [1]
12. Nitrous Oxide - Aurora [1]
13. Robert Nickson - Circles [1]
14. Ferry Tayle & Static Blue - L'Acrobat
15. Ilya Soloviev - Universal Universe

[1] Only available as part of the physical release.
