= Sun & Moon (Above & Beyond song) =

Single by Above & Beyond featuring Richard Bedford

from the album Group Therapy
- Released: 21 March 2011
- Genre: Trance
- Length: 3:08 (club mix); 7:51(extended club mix); 5:25 (album version)
- Label: Anjunabeats
- Songwriters: Jonathan "Jono" Grant; Tony McGuinness; Paavo Siljamaki; Justine Suissa; Sorcha Shepherd
- Producers: Above & Beyond; Andrew Bayer

Above & Beyond featuring Richard Bedford singles chronology
| "On a Good Day (Metropolis)" (2010) | "Sun & Moon" (2011) | "Thing Called Love" (2011) |

"Sun & Moon" is a song by British trance group Above & Beyond featuring singer-songwriter Richard Bedford. Released in March 2011 as the lead single from their second album, Group Therapy, the song reached number 71 in the UK.

== Music video ==
The accompanying music video, directed by Ferry Gouw, features Northern Soul dancer Steve Cato, showing scenes of a man, alternating between his memories of a relationship gone wrong, and him dancing away the pain in a club.

== Track listing ==
Single
| No. | Title | Length |
|---|---|---|
| 1. | "Sun & Moon" (Above & Beyond Club Mix) | 7:51 |
| 2. | "Sun & Moon" (7 Skies Remix) | 8:20 |
| 3. | "Sun & Moon" (Dennis Sheperd Remix) | 7:40 |
| 4. | "Sun & Moon" (Distance Remix) | 4:31 |
| 5. | "Sun & Moon" (Seiji Remix) | 5:07 |
| 6. | "Sun & Moon" (The Others Remix) | 4:40 |

== Charts ==
| Chart (2011) | Peak position |
|---|---|
| Scotland Singles (OCC) | 66 |
| UK Dance (OCC) | 11 |
| UK Singles (OCC) | 71 |
| US Dance/Mix Show Airplay (Billboard) | 6 |
