= Acoustic II =

Compilation album by Above & Beyond
- Released: 3 June 2016
- Recorded: 2016
- Genre: Pop rock, downtempo
- Label: Anjunabeats

Above & Beyond chronology
We Are All We Need (2015)	Acoustic II (2016)	Common Ground (2018)

Acoustic II is the second acoustic compilation album by British progressive trance group Above & Beyond, released on 3 June 2016 through Anjunabeats. The album is the follow-up to their 2014 compilation, Acoustic, and includes acoustic versions of previously released music from their studio albums.

== Track listing ==
No.	Title	Writer(s)	Length
1.	"Hello"	Jonathan Grant; Anthony McGuinness; Paavo Siljamaki; Andrew Bayer	2:45
2.	"We're All We Need"	Grant; McGuinness; Siljamaki; Zoe Johnston	5:02
3.	"On My Way to Heaven"	Grant; McGuinness; Siljamaki	5:14
4.	"Save Me"	Grant; McGuinness; Siljamaki; Johnston	6:11
5.	"All Over the World"	Grant; McGuinness; Siljamaki; Bayer; Alexander Blay	4:35
6.	"No One on Earth"	Grant; McGuinness; Siljamaki; Johnston	4:17
7.	"Black Room Boy"	Grant; McGuinness; Siljamaki; Bayer; Richard Bedford	4:27
8.	"Peace of Mind"	Grant; McGuinness; Siljamaki; Bayer; Johnston	6:23
9.	"Sticky Fingers"	Grant; McGuinness; Siljamaki; Bayer	5:06
10.	"Alchemy"	Grant; McGuinness; Siljamaki; Johnston	5:00
11.	"Counting Down the Days / Liquid Love"	Grant; McGuinness; Siljamaki; Victoria Horn; Bedford	5:40
12.	"Blue Sky Action"	Grant; McGuinness; Siljamaki; Bayer	4:54
13.	"Another Chance"	Grant; McGuinness; Siljamaki; Justine Suissa	4:41

== Charts ==
Chart (2016)	Peak position
Australian Albums (ARIA)	30
Belgian Albums (Ultratop Flanders)	130
Scottish Albums (Official Charts)	45
UK Albums (Official Charts)	52
UK Album Downloads (Official Charts)	21
UK Independent Albums (Official Charts)	6
US Independent Albums (Billboard)	20
