= Flow State =

Flow State may refer to:

- Flow State (Tash Sultana album), 2018
- Flow State (Keith Urban album), 2026
- Flow State, a 2019 album by Above & Beyond
- Flow (psychology), a state of mind

== See also ==
- Flow States, a 2020 album by Marshall Allen, Roscoe Mitchell, Milford Graves, and Scott Robinson
