= Tony McGuinness =

Tony McGuinness may refer to:

- Tony McGuinness (footballer) (born 1964), Australian footballer
- Tony McGuinness (musician) (born 1969), English guitarist and music producer
- Tony McGuinness, member of Irish musical group Aslan
