= Jono Grant =

Jono Grant may refer to:

- Jono Grant (Canadian musician), Canadian composer, producer and multi-instrumentalist
- Jono Grant (DJ), English DJ, musician and vocalist
