= Anjunabeats Volume 3 =

Anjunabeats Volume Three

Compilation album by Above & Beyond
- Released: 13 June 2005
- Genre: Trance, progressive trance
- Label: Anjunabeats; Ultra

Above & Beyond compilation chronology
Anjunabeats Volume 2 (2004)	Anjunabeats Volume 3 (2005)	Anjunabeats Volume 4 (2006)

Anjunabeats Volume Three is the third album in the Anjunabeats Volume compilation series mixed and compiled by British Trance DJs Above & Beyond released on 13 June 2005.

== Track listing ==
No.	Title	Artist	Length
1.	"Eighties (Özgür Can Remix)"	Yilmaz Altanhan	5:20
2.	"Larry Mountains 54 (Original Mix)"	David West Feat. Andreas Hermansson	4:49
3.	"Air For Life (Airwave Mix)"	Above & Beyond vs. Andy Moor	4:45
4.	"Sirens of the Sea (Kyau vs. Albert Vocal Mix)"	OceanLab	6:44
5.	"HiJack (Original Mix)"	Smith & Pledger presents Aspekt	5:25
6.	"Alt+F4 (Original Mix)"	Alt+F4	6:19
7.	"Northern Lights (Original Mix)"	Smith & Pledger	5:22
8.	"Time Goes By (Super8 Deep Mix)"	Carrie Skipper	6:31
9.	"First Aid (Perry O'Neil Mix)"	Super8 + DJ Tab	5:35
10.	"Trust Me (Original Mix)"	Lucas & Beltram	4:41
11.	"Sequential (Original Mix)"	Mike Koglin vs. Jono Grant	5:47
12.	"Getting Away (Original Mix)"	Above & Beyond presents Tranquility Base	6:13
13.	"Resolution (Original Mix)"	Aalto	5:44
14.	"Made of Sun (KvA Volume Three Mix)"	Kyau vs. Albert	6:18
