= Zoë Johnston =

British singer-songwriter

- Born: c. 1976
- Origin: Nottinghamshire, England, United Kingdom
- Genres: Electronic music, Electronic dance, Vocal trance, Folk, Acoustic
- Occupations: Singer, songwriter
- Instruments: Vocals, acoustic guitar
- Years active: 1999–present

Zoë Johnston is a Grammy-nominated British singer and songwriter, born in Nottingham, England. She has written and recorded songs with a number of bands including Faithless, Above & Beyond, Bent, and Delerium, and also with former Beautiful South frontman Paul Heaton as part of his solo projects. Her longest musical collaborative partnership is with UK trance group Above & Beyond.

== Early work ==
Zoë wrote with Nottingham-based house duo Simon White and Cal Gibson, firstly on the single "Cherry Trees" (1999) and then on a number of tracks which were released on their debut album A View From the Heights, released on both vinyl and CD by Glasgow Underground in 1999. In all work with Neon Heights, Zoë is credited under the moniker "Zed J". Numerous remixes of the album tracks followed. Johnston received praise in early write-ups with one reviewer finding her vocals to be "so distinctive, almost unearthly".^{[1]} She also wrote with Hubtone ("Wayback" in 1998 and "Red Balloon" in 1999), Weekender ("Sunday Session" in 2000), and created an unreleased solo EP entitled Balloon Woods (1999).

== Bent ==
After reuniting as old school friends, Zoë began exchanging demos with Simon Mills (one half of the UK electronica duo Bent along with Nail Tolliday). The band were in the process of putting together their debut album having just been signed to Ministry of Sound. At home, Johnston was using a 4 track to record guitars and vocals and had just completed an acoustic version of her song "Private Road". Simon immediately loved it and asked her to re-record it with Bent for inclusion on their debut album, Programmed to Love (2000). Zoë played guitars and sang on the album version of the track. Shortly afterwards, she wrote her vocal parts for the song "Swollen", which was described by the British actor Michael Caine during his BBC Radio 4 broadcast of Desert Island Discs as "one of the most romantic songs in chill music I've ever heard". In keeping with the format of the show, he included "Swollen" in a list of only eight songs he would take with him were he cast away on a desert island with limited resources. He also included the track on a self-compiled chill-out album entitled Cained.

== Faithless ==
Upon the release of "Swollen", Faithless member Rollo Armstrong was one of a few people tasked with re-mixing the song. He was immediately drawn to Zoë's voice but assumed she had been sampled from a 1930s-era record as Mills and Tolliday were at this time frequently building their songs around vocals lifted from old vinyl. When he received the audio parts, he realized otherwise and contacted Zoë asking her to write with Faithless. He sent her a cassette tape of an instrumental track which would eventually become the song "Evergreen". Zoë worked using the 4 track at home and wrote the vocal parts, before re-recording them at the Faithless studio in London with the approval of Rollo and Sister Bliss.

Following this, Johnston returned to the studio to record "Crazy English Summer". Rollo and Sister Bliss had written an instrumental to which Zoë added the lyrics and melody from the first verse and bridge of an acoustic song she been writing at home, called "Crazy English Summers". Johnston also sang with Maxi Jazz on the song "Liontamer".

All three songs were included on the platinum -selling album Outrospective (2001). It became Faithless's biggest selling album in the United Kingdom. Despite some critical press reviews of the album as a whole, Zoë was repeatedly picked out by online commentators and media sources as a stand out highlight, with the BBC writing that "it is Maxi Jazz's soulful testament to his childhood hero "Muhammad Ali" and Zoë Johnston's sublime "Crazy English Summer" that will give this album a shelf life" and reviewers praising her "obvious musical talent" and "original voice, style and sound [which] are so rare in today's music world."

In support of the album, Zoë accompanied the band on an 18-month world tour, performing in multiple countries throughout Europe, as well as in South Africa, Australia, New Zealand, and Malaysia. She sang live with Faithless on the main stage in front of nearly 90,000 at the Werchter festival in Belgium (headlining in front of Coldplay) and on the pyramid stage at Glastonbury Festival in the United Kingdom in 2002. This Glastonbury gig was included by The Daily Telegraph in its 2015 article, "The 100 best Glastonbury performances ever" and was listed at number 21 ahead of many other notable artists.

== Delerium ==
Whilst on tour with Faithless, Johnston wrote the first of three songs for Delerium, entitled "Love" (2002). She received the track on a CD and recorded all of her vocal parts at her own studio before posting the finalized piece to Delerium's label management in the USA. The same set-up yielded the tracks "The Way You Want It to Be" (2003) and "You & I" (2004).

== Paul Heaton (formerly of The Beautiful South) ==
Having listened to the Bent album Programmed to Love and fallen in love with Zoë's voice and song-writing abilities, Heaton got in touch and asked her to perform on his debut solo album Fat Chance on Mercury Records. It was released in 2002 under the pseudonym Biscuit Boy AKA Crackerman. Johnston had by this point formed a habit of only singing her own lyrics, but took a rare deviation from this to duet with Heaton on his own song "Poem". The album as a whole was critically acclaimed but not a commercial success owing in part to Heaton's initial choice not to release the album under his own name. However, "Poems" received high praise from reviewing buyers and also from journalists who were moved by Johnston's performance:

"The album's standout, however, is the rueful, stinging and achingly bittersweet "Poems". When I heard Nick Cave’s song "Love Letter" earlier in the year, I thought I wouldn't hear another song all year that would match its beauty and sad-smile grace. "Poems" comes damn close. One reason is the presence of guest singer Zoe Johnston, who has one of the most incredibly emotive voices I’ve heard in a long time. Sounding like a teary Polly Harvey watching stars fall from the sky or a less self-conscious and mannered Chan Marshall, her duet with Heaton is a real gem and worth the price of the album alone."

Zoë reprised her role with Heaton in 2008 when he invited her to sing on the single "Little Red Rooster". A different version featuring Heaton without accompaniment appeared on his album The Cross Eyed Rambler. Although the main vocals were Paul Heaton's own lyrics, Johnston created and sang all of the choir style backings and harmonies on the track.

== Above and Beyond ==
In 2004, Johnston began working with the UK trance/EDM trio, Above & Beyond (Paavo Siljamäki, Tony McGuinness, and Jono Grant). Her cousin contacted her to say that his old school friend, Jono Grant, and his band wanted her to sing on one of their tracks. Zoë received a CD of instrumentals through the post, and in her own studio wrote and recorded the vocal parts for what became their first collaboration, "No One on Earth". She has said that the song is about being rescued from loneliness by aliens and taken to a different planet ‘"for some heart-repairing". The single was voted Tune of the Year in 2004 in Armin van Buuren’s trance radio show A State of Trance.

In 2006, Zoë wrote and recorded vocals for "Good for Me", which was released on Above & Beyond's debut album Tri-State. The song was again voted Tune of the Year in van Buuren's radio show.

=== Group Therapy album ===
With Johnston's solitary writing process clearly successful, Above & Beyond continued to provide her with instrumentals with a view to developing them into lyrical songs. With the exception of "Alchemy" and other small parts (which were recorded in London), Zoë wrote and recorded all lyrical and vocal content for the Group Therapy songs at her own studio before sending them to Above & Beyond, who then developed the songs further musically, and produced and mixed the music to release standard. Johnston features throughout the album on six songs: "Alchemy", "Giving It Out", "Only a Few Things", "Love Is Not Enough", "You Got to Go", and "Sweetest Heart". The album was released on Anjunabeats to widespread critical acclaim on 6 June 2011. It reached number one on the iTunes Dance Album charts, and was hugely well received in the dance music press, with Mixmag hailing it as Artist Album of the Year.

1,000 copies of a Group Therapy Collector's Book were released along with the album. The 40-page hardback book contained a number of Zoë Johnston's hand-written lyrics and drawings.

Johnston spoke of her fondness for the band members and their collaborations in a rare interview in 2011:

"I’ve been so touched by the constant Above & Beyond drive to include me, look after me, listen to me, absorb me into the project and really nurture whatever I chose to spill out."

=== We Are All We Need album ===
Above & Beyond's fourth studio album We Are All We Need was released on the Anjunabeats label in January 2015, and again featured numerous contributions from Zoë. In a break from the previous writing process, she wrote her vocal parts for the album in London at Above & Beyond's studio, collaborating more closely with the band. As with Group Therapy, she appears on five songs: "We’re All We Need", "Peace of Mind", "Save Me", "Fly to New York", and "Treasure". Zoë received special praise in album reviews: "Johnston’s beautiful but almost haunting and ghostly vocals are captivating", with established followers of her contributions emphatically stating, "My vote is for Zoë Johnston, who continues to produce nothing but quality vocals time and time again."

Zoë appears in the video for the single ‘We’re All We Need’ which is themed around the 1991 Ridley Scott film, ‘Thelma and Louise’. The video was filmed in Arizona, USA in October 2014.

=== Acoustic projects ===
In early 2009, Above & Beyond began considering the idea of creating acoustic versions of their best loved EDM songs and called Zoë in to rehearse with them to test the idea out. In June 2009, they performed as a quartet unplugged in a hot air balloon to competition winning fans and Radio 1 DJ Pete Tong who covered the event for the BBC.

Shortly after this, Zoë performed a number of semi-acoustic songs live with the trio and the addition of celebrated Above & Beyond vocal collaborator Richard Bedford and drummer Sebastian Beresford, to 8,000 people in Beirut's La Marina.

==== Acoustic I ====
Zoë performed acoustic versions of her songs with Above & Beyond for four nights at London's Porchester Hall in June 2013. It was the band's first foray into large scale acoustic shows, with grand piano, harp, strings, percussion, brass, xylophone, rhodes, mandolin, and double bass all featuring in the sound, as well as vocals from Alex Vargas and Annie Drury. The full concert with commentary was streamed live on YouTube on 24 January 2014. As of July 2016, it has amassed over 3,000,000 views and has attracted thousands of positive comments from listeners, with exceptional praise shown for Zoë whose voice is referred to as "beautiful", "magical", "sensual", and "a true gift". Her lyrics are frequently quoted under videos, with their universal appeal summed up with statements such as "my life in a song", "Zoë Johnston sounds like love" and "she sings truth".

The live shows were followed up with an album entitled Acoustic (released on Anjunabeats in January 2014), which saw Johnston performing re-imagined versions of the songs "Love Is Not Enough", "You Got to Go", and "Good for Me". Acoustic was warmly received by fans and positively critiqued by reviewers, who described it as "a masterpiece of an album" and celebrated the ability of the songs to unite Above & Beyond's EDM fans with listeners who were either new to the music or lovers of the acoustic genre.

In October 2013, Above & Beyond took the Acoustic I live show to Los Angeles, and Johnston performed two sold-out nights at the Greek Theatre with the previously assembled full band to wildly enthusiastic crowds. A Billboard review of the show described Johnston's voice as "formidable"’ and reflected of the show itself that "at times, the performance recalled Zero 7 or Portishead’s Roseland NYC Live album from 1998. It was orchestral and ethereal while still rooted in the world of electronica." It was described as "a stellar show... one of the finest shows in dance music history."

Reviewers again praised Zoë's emotive performance: "Zoë Johnston in particular was a triumph. Her performance of ‘You Got to Go’ brought me to tears. Not of sadness or longing, but of emotional buoyancy. The lyrics to the song themselves are uplifting in the way that Above & Beyond's music always is, but the pared-down, slowed-down rendition we heard that night was easily one of my favorite moments in music of this year" – and expressed comfort in the familiarity of a vocal sound which had by now become synonymous with Above & Beyond: "Finally the recognisable voice of Zoë Johnston brought new life to the stage".

On the second night, the band were joined onstage by American producer and DJ Skrillex who took up a guest guitar slot on the song "Black Room Boy", sung by Tony McGuinness.

==== Acoustic II ====
The Acoustic II project comprised a new acoustic album and a sold-out tour of some of the world's most iconic music venues, including Sydney Opera House, Beacon Theatre, The Wang, Royal Albert Hall, Massey Hall, Tivoli, Waikiki Shell, Chicago Theatre, Greek Theatre, and the Hollywood Bowl. The tour took place through May and June 2016, and extended from London and Manchester in the UK to Utrecht, Chicago, Toronto, Boston, New York, San Francisco, Los Angeles, Hawaii and Sydney. Zoë performed five of her songs from the Above & Beyond catalogue during the live shows and provided harmonies on other tracks.

The tour was an enormous success and was universally acclaimed by both fans and critics. Reviewers of both Chicago shows described the music putting "crowds in[to] an acoustic/orchestral trance" and remarked on the "lush grandeur" and "tenderness" of Johnston's songs. The gigs were "an unforgettable, one of a kind experience" in which "people in the crowd laughed, hugged, kissed and cried… one couple got engaged… the concert left us speechless". In the UK others reflected on Johnston's "incredible live performance" stating that it was "absolutely revealing of her simplicity and ability to connect with her audience in such a deep and meaningful way... [she] wins her audience with her down to earth attitude." Two nights of performances at New York City's Beacon Theatre on Broadway garnered glittering praise of the band's "spellbinding performance" which "[brought] tears to the eyes of NYC", with one reviewer summing up the experience as "being mind blown for nearly two hours". Johnston was celebrated for her input: "Zoë’s voice is extraordinary… astounding."

On 28 May 2016, the band played to a sold-out Hollywood Bowl crowd of over 17,000, with journalists and music critics celebrating the show as "beyond compare" and "spellbinding" with Johnston's opening rendition of "We’re All We Need" described as "haunting".

The band received a standing ovation at their last show in Sydney Opera House in recognition of a "musicality [which] completed captivated the crowd in an unprecedented outpouring of love" and the "generosity of spirit" which was shared throughout the gig. Reviews described "genuine warmth… one can only describe the event as magical…. the evening will remain in the hearts and minds of Australians for many years".

The Acoustic II album (released 3 June 2016 on Anjunabeats) accompanied the tour and was well received by both fans and critics who hailed it "a masterpiece… stunning… an incredible piece of work", and described its contents as "tear-jerking". Johnston sings on acoustically re-invented versions of "We’re All We Need", "Save Me", "Peace of Mind", "No One on Earth" and "Alchemy". Her vocal presence on the song "No One on Earth" was critiqued as "bone-chillingly beautiful and hauntingly graceful".

== Grammy nomination ==
In February 2016, Johnston attended the 58th Annual Grammy Awards in Los Angeles as a Grammy nominee with the song "We’re All We Need" (co-written with Above & Beyond). The song was entered into the Best Dance Recording category. Other nominees included Skrillex, the Chemical Brothers, Galantis, Diplo, Kendrick Lamar, Flying Lotus and Justin Bieber. The award went to Skrillex and Diplo (as Jack Ü) with Justin Bieber for the song "Where Are Ü Now".

== Solo album ==
In 2004, Johnston released an album of unpolished home recordings called Happenstances. It is mostly self-recorded, with Zoë playing acoustic guitars and layering harmonies to hone a unique vocal sound. It features the original version of the Faithless song "Crazy English Summer". One notable guest appearance is that of Miles Davis and Carlos Santana band member Benny Rietveld, who performs bass on the song "Something More". The album was released without press coverage and Johnston did not promote or perform it at the time, nor has she since. In the absence of media commentary, it received favourable write-ups from internet reviewers who described Zoë as "a rare talent… she varies her voice in timbre, texture, tone, octave, and volume in a way that is intoxicating". Buyers who posted their views of the album praised "the genius and brilliance of her lyrics", with one writer reflecting that "[the songs] never forced themselves into my consciousness. They simply lay there and made an impression that is indelible."

=== Track listing ===
Note: All tracks written and produced by Zoë Johnston. This album includes the original version (written entirely by Johnston) of the song ‘Crazy English Summer’ which was later adapted in collaboration with Faithless.

Happenstances
No.	Title	Writer(s)	Length
1.	"False Alarms"	Johnston	4:54
2.	"Crazy English Summer"	Johnston	2:42
3.	"Francis"	Johnston	4:55
4.	"Nobody Like Myself"	Johnston	1:09
5.	"No Longer Mine"	Johnston	3:47
6.	"The Sky"	Johnston	4:30
7.	"Straight Though Me"	Johnston	3:10
8.	"Someone Like You"	Johnston	3:41
9.	"Paper to a Flame"	Johnston	3:12
10.	"Francis" (Instrumental)	Johnston	2:18
11.	"Something More"	Johnston; Benny Rietveld	4:28
12.	"So Much and Nothing"	Johnston	7:04
Total length:			45:50

==== 2005 re-release ====
Happenstances
No.	Title	Writer(s)	Length
1.	"False Alarms"	Johnston	4:54
2.	"Crazy English Summer"	Johnston	2:42
3.	"Nobody Like Myself"	Johnston	4:55
4.	"Francis"	Johnston	1:09
5.	"No Longer Mine"	Johnston	3:03
6.	"Beautiful Birds"	Johnston	0:44
7.	"The Sky"	Johnston	4:30
8.	"Straight Though Me"	Johnston	3:10
9.	"Someone Like You"	Johnston	3:41
10.	"Paper to a Flame"	Johnston	3:12
11.	"Francis" (Instrumental)	Johnston	2:18
12.	"Something More"	Johnston; Benny Rietveld	4:23
13.	"My Own Doing"	Johnston	4:27
14.	"So Much and Nothing"	Johnston	4:25
15.	"Paper to a Flame" (Instrumental)	Johnston	1:27
16.	"Without Warning"	Johnston	1:10
Total length:			50:10

== Other projects ==
Johnston wrote and self-recorded vocal parts for the tracks "Leche" (2004) and "Inside Out" (2005) with renowned Faithless, Dido and Spice Girls linked percussionist Sudha. They were released on Sudha's solo album Anti-Freeze in 2009. She also wrote her vocals for instrumentals with house act Weekender ("Sunday Session" in 2000) and with Sleepthief on "A Kind of Magic" (2009), "Reason Why" with Coury Palermo (2009) and "Alice's Door" (2018).

Zoë Johnston has a First Class Honours degree in journalism, Film and Broadcasting and is a keen writer. She creates both impasto and photo-realist paintings and has undertaken a number of private commissions throughout the years. Her main focus is on figure painting and portraiture, but she has also been commissioned to paint creatures including celebrated racehorses.

== Discography ==
=== Studio albums ===
List of studio albums, with selected chart positions
Title	Album details
Happenstances	Released: 27 November 2006; Label: Shiva Records; Format: CD, digital download
Come Back Once More	Released: 1 March 2023; Label: Self-released; Format: CD, digital download

=== Singles ===
==== as lead artist ====
Title	Year	Album
"Nightbird"	2001	Non-album single
"Crazy English Summer"	2005	Happenstances
"Francis"	2006	Happenstances
"Evermore Bright"	2020	Come Back Once More
"Stars & Velvet"	2020	Come Back Once More
"No Time Left"	2020	Come Back Once More
"Courageous"	2020	Come Back Once More
"Broken"	2023	Come Back Once More

==== as featured artist ====
Title	Year	Album
"Swollen" (Bent featuring Zoe Johnston)	2000	Programmed to Love
"Are We Thru?" (Neon Heights and Zed J featuring Zoe Johnston)	2001	A View from the Heights
"Crazy English Summer" (Faithless featuring Zoe Johnston)	2001	Outrospective
"No One on Earth" (Above & Beyond featuring Zoe Johnston)	2004	Non-album single
"Leche" (Sudha featuring Zoe Johnston)	2009	Anti-Freeze
"Reason Why" (Sleepthief featuring Coury Palermo and Zoe Johnston)	2010	Labyrinthine Heart
"You Got to Go" (Above & Beyond featuring Zoe Johnston)	2011	Group Therapy
"Love is Not Enough" (Above & Beyond featuring Zoe Johnston)	2012	Group Therapy
"Alchemy" (Above & Beyond featuring Zoe Johnston)	2012	Group Therapy
"We're All We Need" (Above & Beyond featuring Zoe Johnston)	2014	We Are All We Need
"Peace of Mind" (Above & Beyond featuring Zoe Johnston)	2015	We Are All We Need
"Fly to New York" (Above & Beyond featuring Zoe Johnston)	2015	We Are All We Need
"My Own Hymn" (Above & Beyond featuring Zoe Johnston)	2017	Common Ground
"Always" (Above & Beyond featuring Zoe Johnston)	2018	Common Ground

=== Guest appearances ===
List of non-single guest and un-credited appearances, with other performing artists, showing year released and album name
Title	Year	Other artist(s)	Album
"16 Again"	2000	Neon Heights, Zed J	A View from the Heights
"Private Road"	2000	Bent	Programmed to Love
"3rd Grade Education"	2000	Neon Heights, Zed J	A View from the Heights
"Freeman"	2000	Neon Heights, Zed J	A View from the Heights
"Don't Need Nobody"	2000	Neon Heights, Zed J	A View from the Heights
"Blow Me Down"	2000	Neon Heights, Zed J	A View from the Heights
"Gotta Hear it Natural"	2000	Neon Heights, Zed J	A View from the Heights
"Cherry Trees"	2000	Neon Heights, Zed J	A View from the Heights
"Sweet Bird"	2000	Neon Heights, Zed J	A View from the Heights
"Sunday Session"	2001	Weekender	House Warming 01
"Poems"	2001	Biscuit Boy	Fat Chance
"Evergreen"	2001	Faithless	Outrospective
"Liontamer"	2001	Faithless	Outrospective
"Love"	2003	Delerium	Chimera
"Way Back"	2003	Hubtone	Interiors
"Along These Lines"	2003	Hubtone	Interiors
"You & I"	2004	Delerium	The Best Of
"Good for Me"	2006	Above & Beyond	Tri-State
"The Way You Want It to Be"	2006	Delerium	Nuages du Monde
"Inside Out"	2007	Sudha	Anti-Freeze
"A Kind of Magic"	2009	Sleepthief	Labyrinthine Heart
"I'll Never Regret You"	2010	Solo	Beauty 2: Music that Touches the Soul
"Giving It Out"	2011	Above & Beyond	Group Therapy
"Sweetest Heart"	2011	Above & Beyond	Group Therapy
"Only a Few Things"	2011	Above & Beyond	Group Therapy
"Did Your Heart Break?"	2013	Bent	From the Vaults: 2986-2006
"You Got to Go"	2014	Above & Beyond	Acoustic
"Good for Me"	2014	Above & Beyond	Acoustic
"Love is Not Enough"	2014	Above & Beyond	Acoustic
"Save Me"	2015	Above & Beyond	We Are All We Need
"Treasure"	2015	Above & Beyond	We Are All We Need
"We're All We Need"	2016	Above & Beyond	Acoustic II
"Save Me"	2016	Above & Beyond	Acoustic II
"No One on Earth"	2016	Above & Beyond	Acoustic II
"Peace of Mind"	2016	Above & Beyond	Acoustic II
"Alchemy"	2016	Above & Beyond	Acoustic II
"Sahara Love"	2018	Above & Beyond	Common Ground
"Alice's Door"	2018	Sleepthief	Mortal Longing
"Falling"	2020	Above & Beyond	Non-album single
