= Sudha Kheterpal =

British-Indian musician (born 1982)

- Sudha

Background information
- Birth name: Sudha Kheterpal
- Born: 28 March 1982 (age 43); Nottingham, England
- Origin: London, England
- Genres: Electronica
- Occupation: Musician
- Instrument: Percussion
- Labels: Bish Bash Records
- Website: http://www.sudha.co.uk

Sudha Kheterpal (born 28 March 1982) is a British-Indian musician best known as the percussionist in Faithless. In 2008, she toured with The Return of the Spice Girls. She has also played with K-Klass, Kylie Minogue, Melanie Williams, Jo Roberts, Corduroy, Mark Morrison, Rae and Christian, Ian Brown, Talvin Singh, The Pussycat Dolls and Dido.

== Discography ==
- Anti-Freeze (solo album)

== Films ==
- 2004 – Eleni's Olives
- 1997 – A Life Less Ordinary
