= Anjunabeats Volume 10 =

Compilation album by Above & Beyond
- Released: 4 March 2013
- Genre: Trance, progressive trance, progressive house
- Label: Anjunabeats

Above & Beyond compilation chronology
Anjunabeats Volume 9 (2011)	Anjunabeats Volume 10 (2013)	Anjunabeats Volume 11 (2014)

Anjunabeats Volume 10 is the tenth installment in the Anjunabeats Volume compilation series mixed and compiled by British trance group Above & Beyond. It was released on 4 March 2013 by Anjunabeats.

== Track listing ==
The track list for the album was revealed on 30 January 2013.

Disc One
No.	Title	Artist	Length
1.	"Small Moments"	Above & Beyond	2:52
2.	"Animus"	Soundprank	5:29
3.	"Isla Margarita"	Sunny Lax	5:21
4.	"Wayfarer"	Audien	4:21
5.	"Ohh"	Mike Shiver	5:58
6.	"Alchemy" (Above & Beyond Club Mix)	Above & Beyond feat. Zoë Johnston	5:57
7.	"Inception"	Jaytech	4:27
8.	"When You Loved Me"	Boom Jinx, Maor Levi & Ashley Tomberlin	4:27
9.	"Pressure"	Oliver Smith	5:26
10.	"Pink Skye"	Ronski Speed & Syntrobic feat. Renee Stahl	5:48
11.	"Walter White"	Above & Beyond	5:33
12.	"Glühwürmchen"	Kyau & Albert	4:11
13.	"Holding On"	Maor Levi	5:10
14.	"Here We Go"	Ost & Meyer	5:33
15.	"Liquid Love" (Maor Levi Club Mix)	Above & Beyond	6:59

Disc Two
No.	Title	Artist	Length
1.	"England"	Andrew Bayer	5:35
2.	"Aldo"	Norin & Rad	5:16
3.	"Stateside"	Genix	6:44
4.	"K.O."	Nitrous Oxide pres. N2O	4:29
5.	"L.A."	Super8 & Tab	4:11
6.	"Sinai"	ilan Bluestone	5:54
7.	"Right On"	7 Skies vs. Nitrous Oxide	4:40
8.	"Believe in Me" (Instrumental)	Arty	5:09
9.	"Black Room Boy" (Above & Beyond Club Mix)	Above & Beyond	5:47
10.	"Revolved"	Eximinds	4:03
11.	"Home" (Genix Remix)	Above & Beyond	5:34
12.	"Sanity Dub" (Exclusive Volume 10 Mix)	Ronski Speed	5:48
13.	"Immersion"	Lange vs. Genix	5:04
14.	"Vision"	Mike Koglin vs. 7 Skies	5:37
15.	"Only Totally"	Bart Claessen & Raz Nitzan pres. Who.Is	5:20

iTunes Bonus Track
No.	Title	Artist	Length
1.	"Black Room Boy" (Maor's Deep Room Mix)	Above & Beyond	6:30

== Release history ==
Region	Date	Label	Format	Catalog
United Kingdom	4 March 2013	Anjunabeats	CD	ANJCD033
