= Tri-State (album) =

Studio album by Above & Beyond
- Released: 6 March 2006
- Recorded: 2005
- Studios: Fortress (London, England)
- Genres: Trance, progressive trance
- Length: 74:39
- Label: Anjunabeats
- Producers: Jono Grant; Tony McGuinness; Paavo Siljamäki

Above & Beyond chronology
Tri-State (2006)	Group Therapy (2011)

Singles from Tri-State
- 1. "Air for Life" Released: 18 July 2005; 2. "Alone Tonight" Released: 1 March 2006; 3. "Can't Sleep" Released: 3 July 2006; 4. "Good for Me" Released: 12 March 2007; 5. "Home" Released: 22 October 2007

Tri-State is the debut studio album by the British progressive trance group Above & Beyond, released on 6 March 2006. The album features collaborations with Zoë Johnston, Richard Bedford, Carrie Skipper and progressive trance producer Andy Moor. The first single from the album, "Air for Life", was released on 18 July 2005, and was voted Tune of the Year in 2005 on Armin Van Buuren's A State of Trance radio show. The single "Good for Me" (Above & Beyond Club Mix), featuring Zoë Johnston was voted Tune of the Year in 2006 on A State of Trance. During New Year's Eve in 2007, Above & Beyond performed at Barra Beach, Rio de Janeiro, to an estimated crowd of a million people where they showcased tracks from Tri-State along with their previous singles. Later that year, a remix album, Tri-State Remixed, was released.

== Critical reception ==
Jon O' Brien from AllMusic described the album as "echoing the sleek, electronic rhythms, melodic vocals, and lush, ethereal production of BT and Delirium [sic]", whose tracks are a "combination of uplifting club anthems and hypnotic instrumentals". BBC's Andy Puleston wrote that together with singles "Air For Life" and "Alone Tonight", Tri-State was a "sterling effort" to create a record that defines trance music the same way Faithless and Orbital did with their respective genres, but nevertheless "does little to deviate or expand on the brief".

In a 10-year-anniversary revisit of the album, Christina Hernandez from Dancing Astronaut dubbed "Good For Me" as "one of Above & Beyond’s top pieces of all time", and noted Richard Bedford's vocals on "Alone Tonight" whose "voice on it will continue to be listed among Above & Beyond’s most memorable compositions". She also called "Can't Sleep" as a "winning track from Tri-State", having been nominated to the top three trance tracks of 2006 on A State of Trance.

== Track listing ==
Tri-State track listing
No.	Title	Writer(s)	Producer(s)	Length
1.	"Tri-State"	Jonathan Grant; Tony McGuinness; Paavo Siljamaki	Above & Beyond	4:11
2.	"Stealing Time"	Grant; McGuinness; Siljamaki	Above & Beyond	7:11
3.	"World on Fire"	Grant; McGuinness; Siljamaki	Above & Beyond	4:43
4.	"Air for Life" (with Andy Moor)	Grant; McGuinness; Siljamaki; Andrew Beardmore	Above & Beyond; Andy Moor	7:27
5.	"Can't Sleep"	Grant; McGuinness; Siljamaki; Ashley Tomberlin	Above & Beyond	7:23
6.	"Hope"	Grant; McGuinness; Siljamaki	Above & Beyond	4:28
7.	"Liquid Love"	Grant; McGuinness; Siljamaki; Richard Bedford	Above & Beyond	6:42
8.	"In the Past"	Grant; McGuinness; Siljamaki	Above & Beyond	2:30
9.	"Alone Tonight"	Grant; McGuinness; Siljamaki	Above & Beyond	6:22
10.	"Good for Me"	Grant; McGuinness; Siljamaki; Zoë Johnston	Above & Beyond; Johnston	5:40
11.	"For All I Care"	Grant; McGuinness; Siljamaki	Above & Beyond	5:50
12.	"Indonesia"	Grant; McGuinness; Siljamaki	Above & Beyond	5:01
13.	"Home"	Grant; McGuinness; Siljamaki; Hannah Thomas	Above & Beyond	7:11
Total length:				74:39

== Personnel ==
Credits adapted from AllMusic

Technical and composing credits

- Jono Grant – primary artist, arranger, composer, producer
- Tony McGuinness – primary artist, arranger, composer, producer, vocals
- Paavo Siljamäki – primary artist, arranger, producer
- Richard Bedford – vocals (tracks 2,7,9)
- Zoë Johnston – vocals (track 10)
- Andy Moor – composer, primary artist, producer
- Carrie Skipper – vocals
- Ashley Tomberlin – composer, vocals (track 5)
- Hannah Thomas – vocals (track 13)

Creative credits

- James Grant – management
- Dan Myles – label management
- Tim Ashton – photography, illustration
- Chris Davison – photography
- Jono Grant – sleeve design, photography
- Tony McGuinness – sleeve design, photography
- Paavo Siljamäki – sleeve design, photography

Recording personnel

- Miles Showell – mastering
