= Jono Grant (DJ) =

English DJ and musician

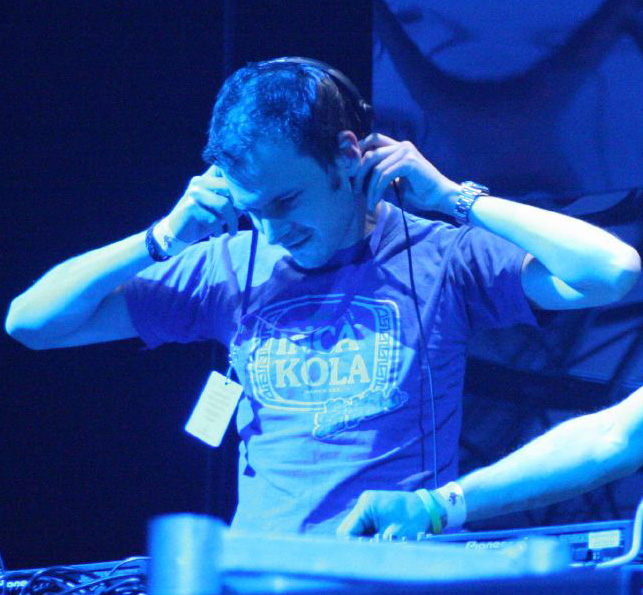

Jono Grant (born 16 November 1979) is an English DJ, musician and vocalist, better known as a member of electronic music group Above & Beyond (alongside Tony McGuinness and Paavo Siljamäki) and duo JODA (with Darren Tate). He is also a part owner of London-based electronic dance music labels Anjunabeats and Anjunadeep.

== Personal life ==
Grant attended the University of Westminster where he met fellow Above & Beyond member Paavo Siljamäki and discovered a mutual interest in Electronic Music.

Grant married his wife Giselle in Miami.

Grant's sister, Charlotte, died in early 2015 on her 42nd birthday. The passing of Charlotte led the group to create the 'Little Something fund', designated to help perinatal mental health and encourage and empower women on their road to recovery.

== Music career ==
After meeting Siljamäki, in 2000, they released their first single, "Volume One" under the name Anjunabeats, which would also be the name of the label they founded.

Above & Beyond then teamed up with vocalist Justine Suissa and formed OceanLab in 2001, which they scored their highest hit to-date, Satellite, in 2004.

In 2000, Grant met Darren Tate while on tour in Tokyo, and released the single Let the Shine in released in 2003. Two decades later, in 2020 Above & Beyond teamed up with Tate to compose the score "The Last Glaciers" (released 2022), a year that also saw the return of the Jono Grant/Darren Tate duo collaborating as a song-writing partnership under the name of JODA.

Jono Grant is the brother of James Grant, who acts as Above & Beyond's artist manager, and who together founded the Anjunadeep label in 2006, this time focusing on Deep House.

With Above & Beyond, Grant went on to release 5 studio albums (Tri-State in 2006, Group Therapy in 2011, We Are All We Need in 2015, Common Ground in 2018, and Bigger Than All Of Us in 2025), 1 as OceanLab (Sirens of the Sea in 2008) as well as 2 acoustic albums (Acoustic and Acoustic II), 2 downtempo Flow State albums, 15 Anjunabeats compilations and a handful of other mixes.

Following a moderate success of Volume One, Liam McGuinness (Tony's brother) got in touch with Jono Grant who later, alongside Siljamäki, helped him to finish a remix of Chakra – Home, leading to what would be the birth of Above & Beyond.

Other than electronic synthesizers, Jono Grant plays piano and the Fender Rhodes as well performing lead vocals on tracks like "1001 (Is It Love?)", "Diving Out of Love" and the band's cover of New Order's "Blue Monday".

In 2022, Grant partnered with Darren Tate on a new indie project called JODA.
