= Above & Beyond (band) =

English electronic music group

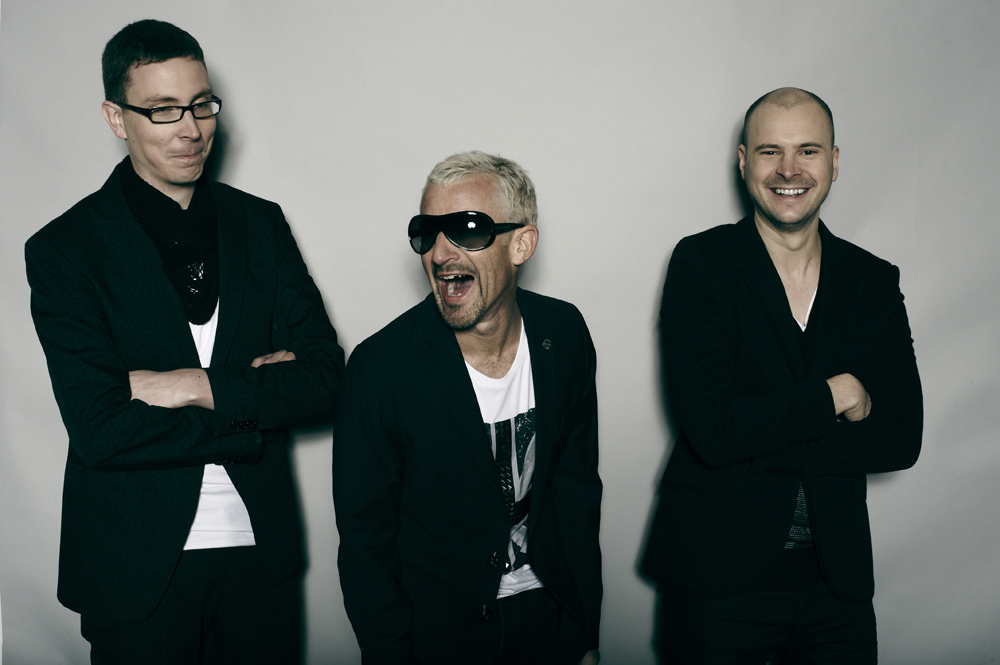
- Left-right, Paavo Siljamäki, Tony McGuinness, Jono Grant in 2011.

Background information
- Also known as: OceanLab; Dirt Devils; Rollerball; Tongue Of God; Tranquility Base
- Origin: London, England, UK
- Genres: Trance; vocal trance; progressive trance; progressive house; big room house
- Occupations: Disc jockeys, record producers
- Years active: 1999–present
- Labels: Anjunabeats, Anjunadeep, Anjunachill
- Members: Jono Grant; Tony McGuinness; Paavo Siljamäki
- Website: aboveandbeyond.nu

Above & Beyond are an electronic music group consisting of English musicians/DJs Jono Grant, Tony McGuinness and Finnish musician/DJ Paavo Siljamäki. Formed in 2000, they have released five studio albums, and have been consistently ranked among DJ Magazine's Top 100 DJs Poll. Two of their singles have been nominated for Grammy Awards: "We're All We Need" (58th) and "Northern Soul" (61st).

They are also the owners of London-based electronic dance music labels Anjunabeats, Anjunadeep, and Anjunachill, and host a weekly radio show, Group Therapy Radio.

== History ==
=== Formation (1999–2000) ===
Grant and Siljamäki met at the University of Westminster. Having discovered a common mutual interest for electronic music, they decided to collaborate in writing music together. Following Siljamäki's suggestion, they set up the Anjunabeats label in the summer of 1999 with the release of their first single, "Volume One", under the alias Anjunabeats. Initially, the Anjunabeats record label was founded as a medium to release their own music. Since the label acquired the same name as their production alias, however, they started to release music under different names, most notably as Dirt Devils and Free State.

The original mix of 'Volume One' packaged with their Tease Dub Mix, received attention in dance clubs and was promoted by DJs such as Pete Tong, Paul Oakenfold, Judge Jules, and Paul van Dyk, after Grant and Siljamäki handed a dub plate of the song to Paul Oakenfold in 2000 at London nightclub Home.

After the release of 'Volume One' and a series of other singles and remixes under the names 'Free State' and 'Dirt Devils', the marketing director and manager of Warner Music Group, Tony McGuinness, was informed about the duo by his brother, Liam McGuinness.

Liam had purchased a sample library that Grant had created for Yamaha and got in touch with Jono. Having been commissioned to remix Chakra's "Home", Tony McGuinness asked Grant and Siljamäki to help him complete the remix. The group adopted their artist name for the Chakra remix, 'Above & Beyond', from a slogan used by an American motivational trainer also named Jono Grant, which Grant had on a poster on his wall. Their remix of Chakra's "Home" was chosen over remixes by Rob Searle and Tilt to be the A-side mix. It was played by Pete Tong on BBC Radio 1, and reached number one in the UK club charts.

In addition to Above & Beyond's production work, the trio also established the vocal trance group OceanLab with Justine Suissa. Other collaborators in the band's early stages include Andy Moor and vocalists Carrie Skipper, Ashley Tomberlin, Zoë Johnston, and Richard Bedford.

=== Early productions and DJ career debut (2001–2005) ===
"Madonna – What It Feels Like For a Girl (Above & Beyond Video Edit)"
Sample of Above & Beyond's video remix of Madonna's What It Feels Like For A Girl.

Early on in their career, the trio remixed Aurora's "Ordinary World", Fragma's "Everytime You Need Me", Perpetuous Dreamer's "The Sound of Goodbye", and Adamski's "In the City". These tracks served as the foundation for Above & Beyond's reputation as one of the UK's leading vocal trance remixers.

In 2001, Above & Beyond produced a club mix for Madonna's single "What It Feels Like for a Girl", and also remixed select tracks by Delerium, Three Drives, and J-pop artist Ayumi Hamasaki.

In 2002, Above & Beyond made their DJ debut in Tokyo, performing for an audience of 8,000 alongside Ferry Corsten and Tiësto. They appeared regularly at large clubs and music festivals, including Rockness, Glastonbury, and Creamfields in the UK and Amnesia in Ibiza, Spain.

In 2003, Above & Beyond remixed Tomcraft's "Loneliness", Motorcycle's "As the Rush Comes", as well as being asked back by Madonna to remix "Nobody Knows Me". Other remixes included Britney Spears' single "Everytime", Dido's "Sand in My Shoes", and Delerium's "Silence".

Above & Beyond's single "No One On Earth", featuring vocals by Zoë Johnston, soon followed. The Gabriel & Dresden Remix of this song was voted Tune of the Year for 2004 in Armin van Buuren's trance radio show A State of Trance.

In 2004, OceanLab's fourth single, "Satellite", was released, reaching No. 19 on the UK chart in May 2004.

=== Tri-State era (2006–2009) ===
In 2006, Above & Beyond released their debut artist album, Tri-State. UK-based DJ Magazine gave the album a five-star review, saying, "A blend of sleek electronic rhythms, lush filmic textures and old-fashioned song writing. Tri-State is the fulfillment of any dance act's ultimate album aspiration: a padding-free, skilled, diverse long-player. In a word, 'Brilliant.'"

Singles from the album include "Air for Life", with Andy Moor, which won Best Underground Dance Track at the 2006 Miami Winter Music Conference and was named Tune of the Year for 2005, as voted by the listeners of Armin van Buuren's radio show A State of Trance. "Alone Tonight", featuring Richard Bedford, was nominated for best progressive house/trance track at the 22nd International Dance Music Awards held at the 2007 Miami WMC, reaching No. 4 in the Finland National Singles chart and No. 5 in the UK Dance Chart. Above & Beyond performed "Alone Tonight" at the Global Gathering 2005 broadcast live on Radio One in the UK. Their single "Can't Sleep" was included on A State of Trance's episode 280, which featured at No. 3 on the best 20 tracks of 2006, according to the fans that voted in its polls. The Above & Beyond Club Mix of their track "Good for Me", featuring Zoë Johnston, was also voted Tune of the Year in 2006 on Van Buuren's A State of Trance. In 2008, Above & Beyond won Best Underground Dance Track at the IDMA Awards at the Winter Music Conference with their Above & Beyond Club Mix of their single "Home".

On 31 December 2007, Above & Beyond unofficially hosted their largest show ever on Barra Beach, Rio de Janeiro, where they reportedly played to an estimated one million people.

In 2009, Above & Beyond performed at the official launch of Virgin Galactic's SpaceShipTwo. The event took place in the Mojave Desert and was hosted by Sir Richard Branson and attended by Arnold Schwarzenegger. The performance was secured after Above & Beyond's Buzz Aldrin-sampling club track "Buzz" was picked by Virgin to soundtrack the unveiling of the spaceship.

=== Group Therapy era (2010–2014) ===
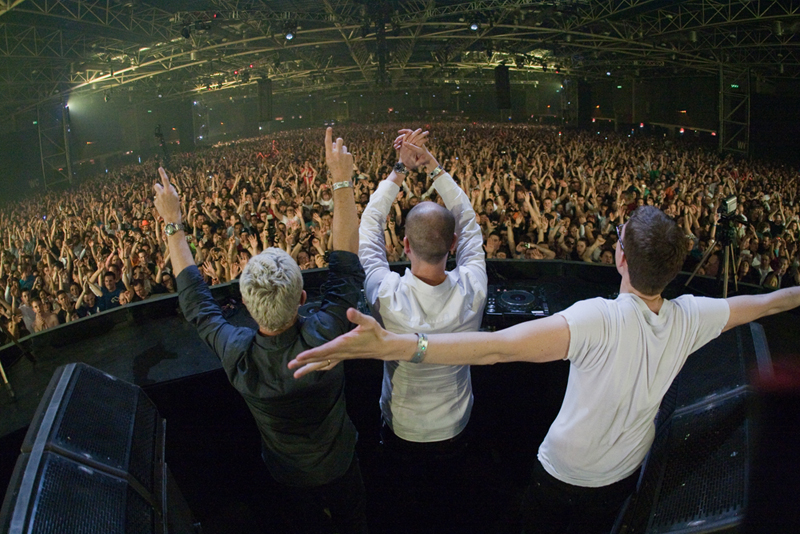
Above & Beyond at Trance Energy, 2010.

The first single from Above & Beyond's second artist album, Group Therapy, was "Thing Called Love", featuring vocals from Richard Bedford. It was included on the Anjunabeats Volume 8 compilation album released on 19 July 2010. Group Therapy was released on 6 June 2011, and charted at number one in the iTunes Dance Album charts. DJ Magazine put the three members of Above & Beyond on the cover of their May issue, describing them as the "biggest DJ/production collective the UK has ever produced." Mixmag named the album as "Artist Album of the Year". All songs were written and produced by Above & Beyond, with Richard Bedford and Zoë Johnston providing vocals.

The first official radio single from the album, "Sun & Moon", featuring vocals from Richard Bedford, was championed by BBC Radio 1 DJ Vernon Kay, and was included on the station's B-List, as was the second radio single, "Thing Called Love". "Thing Called Love" was used in an episode of the MTV drama Teen Wolf. In 2017, Billboard named "Sun & Moon" the saddest dance music song of all-time.

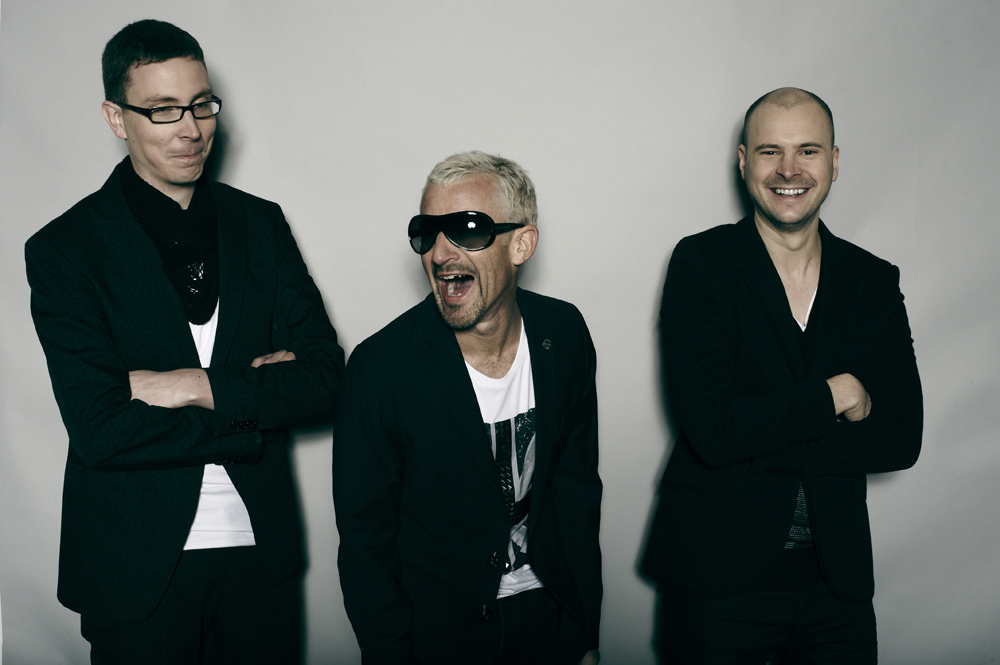
Above & Beyond in 2011

In 2012, Above & Beyond embarked on its Group Therapy World Tour, performing sold-out shows at select venues and clubs across North America, Europe, Asia and Australia. The group also made their debut in Hawaii, performing at the Kaka’ako Waterfront Park in Honolulu. In August 2012, Above & Beyond appeared on the cover of Mixmag and performed a live set at Mixmag Headquarters along with Mat Zo. The two-hour set was subsequently released as a label showcase mix titled United Colours of Anjunabeats.

In 2013, Above & Beyond headlined and performed at several dance music festivals, including Ultra Music Festival, Electric Daisy Carnival, Electric Forest, Tomorrowland and Stereosonic. The group also performed their first acoustic shows at Porchester Hall in London and The Greek Theater in Los Angeles, featuring Zoë Johnston, Alex Vargas and Annie Drury, among other special guests including Skrillex. On 26 October 2013, Above & Beyond celebrated Episode 050 of Group Therapy Radio (their 500th radio show overall) at Alexandra Palace in London with a live 6-hour broadcast.

On 18 October 2014, Above & Beyond celebrated Episode 100 of Group Therapy Radio at Madison Square Garden in New York City with a live broadcast. Ilan Bluestone opened the show, followed by Andrew Bayer and Mat Zo, respectively. Above & Beyond then took the stage and performed a 2-hour set. During the set, they debuted new music from their upcoming album We Are All We Need. The previous day, 17 October, Above & Beyond had premiered the video for the title track of We Are All We Need in Times Square, and were nearly arrested when several hundred of their fans arrived to see the video. Police on horseback were summoned to the location, as traffic was beginning to become blocked.

=== Acoustic, We Are All We Need, and Acoustic II (2014–2016) ===
Following acoustic shows in London and Los Angeles, Above & Beyond premiered the concert film Live From Porchester Hall on 24 January 2014 across the world. Then the album, Acoustic, was released on 28 January 2014. Tony McGuinness wrote:

"The acoustic project is a reconnection with the musicians that we were before we met ... the songs have been on an interesting journey to get here because we tend to write in a fairly acoustic way anyway. We don't just stick a bit of vocal over a dance track – that's not how we work. We try to start with a song and it's usually only later down the line that we take certain elements from that song and progress them into a more dancefloor-friendly version."

A special edition of Acoustic was also released, containing a DVD of the concert film in London, a photographic journal, and signed commentary from all members of the band. A limited press double vinyl edition was later released on 17 March 2014.

During their acoustic shows at Porchester Hall, Above & Beyond announced that their third artist album would be released sometime in 2014, featuring vocalists Alex Vargas and Justine Suissa as collaborators.

On 14 October 2014, Above & Beyond announced their third studio album, We Are All We Need, which was released on 19 January 2015, releasing a day later in the US and Canada.

On 26 September 2015, the group announced that a second acoustic album, Acoustic II, would be released on 3 June 2016. A world tour with dates across Europe, North America, and Australia was scheduled in support of the new material. The tour featured artists Zoë Johnston, Justine Suissa, Cobi, and Natalie Holmes.

=== Common Ground and Flow State (2017–2024) ===
On 4 August 2017, Above & Beyond released the single 'Tightrope' featuring Marty Longstaff.

On 8 September 2017, Above & Beyond released the single 'My Own Hymn' featuring long-time collaborator Zoë Johnston.

On 3 November 2017, the single 'Northern Soul' was released with a returning vocalist Richard Bedford.

On 19 January 2018, the trio released the single 'Always', featuring Zoë Johnston. A music video which features the artists performing the single on top of a French Alps mountain was released together on the same day.

The album Common Ground was released on 26 January 2018 through Anjunabeats, containing the aforementioned singles "Tightrope", "My Own Hymn", "Northern Soul" and "Always".

On 15 May 2018, the group released "Red Rocks" which was inspired by the Red Rocks Amphitheatre structure in Colorado. Their next single, "Rocket Science", was released on 7 September 2018 and was previously debuted in front of 23,000 listeners at their 2017 Gorge Amphitheatre performance. The group wrote in a joint statement that the track began as an experiment trying out a new DAW, which they enjoyed working with.

In June 2019, the group announced their fifth album, Flow State, which was released on 19 July 2019, and is an entirely ambient album. In November 2022 "Don't Leave", a track from Flow State, was certified gold the Recording Industry Association of America (RIAA), denoting 0.5 million units based on sales and streaming in the United States.

=== Bigger Than All of Us (2025-present) ===
Above & Beyond announced their next album on 19 March 2025, Bigger Than All of Us. The first single from the album, Quicksand was released on 21 March 2025. The full album, Bigger Than All of Us was released world-wide on Anjunabeats, 18 July 2025.

== Radio shows ==
Above & Beyond produce a weekly show and have produced several radio shows since 2004. Above & Beyond produce a weekly radio show called Group Therapy Radio in which the trio take turns hosting the weekly show. The show lasts for two hours, where the last half an hour is filled with a guest mix by a guest DJ. Group Therapy is broadcast every Friday at 7pm UTC +1. It is broadcast on several media, including YouTube, Twitch and as of late Facebook and Spotify.

=== Trance Around the World (2004–2012) ===
Trance Around the World was a weekly radio show comprising a total number of 450 episodes from 2004 to 2012. It reached an audience of 30 million listeners in 35 countries weekly, making it one of the most listened to radio shows in the world. TATW also served as a platform to promote new artists on Above & Beyond's renowned Anjunabeats label. There have been various special episodes of TATW, including live Above & Beyond sets from festivals and radio episodic milestones, such as Episode 400, which was celebrated in November 2011 in Beirut, Lebanon. Trance Around the World ended its nine-year broadcast in November 2012, celebrating Episode 450 in Bangalore, India.

=== Group Therapy Radio (2012–present) ===
On 5 November 2012, Above & Beyond announced the launch of Group Therapy Radio, successor to Trance Around the World. Episode 001 was broadcast concurrently during Trance Around the World, Episode 450 in Bangalore, India.

On 26 October 2013, ABGT 050 was held at the Alexandra Palace in London. ABGT 100 took place in Madison Square Garden in New York City.

On 26 September 2015, Above & Beyond held their 150th episode of Group Therapy Radio through their mainstage event at Sydney, Australia at the Allphones Arena. ABGT 200 took place on 24 September 2016 at the Ziggo Dome in Amsterdam.

On 16 and 17 September 2017, Above & Beyond held ABGT 250 at The Gorge Amphitheatre in George, Washington, marking the first multi-day ABGT show.

On 29 September 2018, ABGT 300 was held in Hong Kong at the AsiaWorld-Expo, featuring performances from other Anjunabeats artists such as Ben Böhmer, Spencer Brown, ilan Bluestone, and Andrew Bayer. ABGT 350 was held at the O2 Arena in Prague on 11 October 2019.

ABGT400 was held on 26 September 2020, and due to the COVID-19 pandemic, was a virtual event, which Above & Beyond livestreamed from London. The set celebrated 20 years of their label Anjunabeats and featured mostly older songs. ABGT 450 was held on 4 September 2021 at The Drumsheds, London, after an 18-month hiatus of in-person concerts due to COVID-19.

On 10 September 2021 with ABGT 451, the show officially became longer-running than Trance Around the World. After ABGT 450, a 15-20 minute mix of "Radio Highlights" replaced the full 2-hour podcast/radio show on many streaming platforms like IHeartRadio, Spotify, Audacy and ITunes. The conventional 2-hour mix, however, continued on YouTube, SoundCloud, Mixcloud and Apple Music (via RSS feed) and is also broadcast as a radio show to stations in more than 30 countries globally.

On 28 March 2022, it was announced that ABGT 500 will be on 15 October 2022 at the Banc of California Stadium in Los Angeles, United States. It was announced in March 2024 that ABGT600 would be held at the Hipódromo de las Américas in Mexico City, Mexico on 19 October 2024.

=== Other radio appearances ===
Since 2004, Above & Beyond have appeared numerous times on BBC Radio 1's Essential Mix. In 2004 and 2011, their guest mixes were voted as Essential Mix of the Year. On 24 January 2014, the group was inducted into Pete Tong's Hall of Fame. Up until 2023, Above & Beyond were the only artists to have ever won the Essential Mix of the Year twice. In 2018, the group did a guest mix for "Metropolis", a Saturday night show that airs on Los Angeles' KCRW. KCRW also did an interview with them in 2014 for their acoustic tour.

== Discography ==
Studio albums

- Tri-State (2006)
- Group Therapy (2011)
- We Are All We Need (2015)
- Common Ground (2018)
- Flow State (2019)
- Bigger Than All of Us (2025)

As OceanLab

- Sirens of the Sea (2008)

EPs

- Tranquility Base, Vol. 1 (2023)
- Tranquility Base, Vol. 2 (2024)

== Awards and nominations ==
=== A State of Trance ===
Year	Nominated Work	Category	Result
2004	"No One On Earth" (Gabriel & Dresden Vocal Mix) (featuring Zoë Johnston)	Tune of the Year	Won
2005	"Air for Life" (Original Mix) (featuring Andy Moor)	Tune of the Year	Won
2006	"Good for Me" (Club Mix) (featuring Zoë Johnston)	Tune of the Year	Won

=== BBC Radio ===
Year	Nominated Artist	Category	Result
2004	Above & Beyond	Essential Mix of the Year	Won
2011	Above & Beyond	Essential Mix of the Year	Won

=== Beatport Music Awards ===
Year	Nominated Work	Category	Result
2009	Above & Beyond	Best Trance Artist	Nominated
2010	Above & Beyond	Best Trance Artist	Nominated
2014	Anjunabeats	Label of the Year	Nominated

=== DJ Awards (Ibiza) ===
Year	Nominated Work	Category	Result
2007	Above & Beyond	Trance	Nominated
2008	Above & Beyond	Trance	Nominated
2009	Above & Beyond	Trance	Nominated
2010	Above & Beyond	Trance	Nominated
2012	Above & Beyond	Trance	Nominated
2013	Above & Beyond	Trance	Nominated
2014	Above & Beyond	Trance	Nominated
2015	Above & Beyond	Trance	Nominated

=== DJ Magazine ===
==== Top 100 DJs ranking ====
Year	Result
2004	#39 (Debut)
2005	#19
2006	#9
2007	#6
2008	#4
2009	#4
2010	#5
2011	#5
2012	#8
2013	#17
2014	#25
2015	#29
2016	#47
2017	#27
2018	#51
2019	#22
2020	#19
2021	#21
2022	#30
2023	#40
2024	#53
2025	#61

=== Grammy Awards ===
Year	Nominated Work	Category	Result
2016	"We're All We Need" (featuring Zoë Johnston)	Best Dance Recording	Nominated
2018	"Northern Soul" (featuring Richard Bedford)	Best Dance Recording	Nominated

=== International Dance Music Awards ===
Year	Nominated Work	Category	Result
2005	"No One On Earth" (featuring Zoë Johnston)	Best Hi-NRG / Euro Track	Nominated
2005	Above & Beyond	Best Remixer	Nominated
2005	Above & Beyond	Best Dance Artist Group	Nominated
2006	"Air for Life" (with Andy Moor)	Best Underground Dance Track	Won
2006	"Air for Life" (with Andy Moor)	Best Progressive House / Trance Track	Nominated
2006	Above & Beyond	Ortofon Best European DJ Award	Nominated
2006	Anjunabeats Volume 3	Best Full Length DJ Mix CD	Nominated
2006	Anjunabeats	Best Global Dance Record Label	Nominated
2007	"Alone Tonight" (featuring Richard Bedford)	Best Progressive House / Trance Track	Nominated
2007	Above & Beyond	Best Producer	Nominated
2007	Anjunabeats Worldwide Volume 1	Best CD Compilation	Nominated
2008	"Home" (featuring Hannah Thomas)	Best Underground Dance Track	Won
2008	Anjunabeats Volume 5	Best Full Length DJ Mix	Nominated
2008	Above & Beyond	Best Producer	Nominated
2008	Above & Beyond	Best Dance Artist (Group)	Nominated
2009	Above & Beyond	Best European DJ	Nominated
2009	Above & Beyond	Best Global DJ	Nominated
2009	Above & Beyond	Best Producer	Nominated
2009	Above & Beyond	Best Artist (Group)	Nominated
2009	Above & Beyond (for Trance Around the World)	Best Radio Mix Show DJ	Nominated
2009	Anjunabeats Volume 6	Best Full Length DJ Mix	Nominated
2009	Trance Around the World	Best Podcast	Nominated
2009	Anjunabeats	Best Global Record Label	Nominated
2010	"On a Good Day" (Above & Beyond presents OceanLab)	Best Hi-NRG / Euro Track	Nominated
2010	"On a Good Day" (Above & Beyond presents OceanLab)	Best Trance Track	Nominated
2010	Above & Beyond	Best European DJ	Nominated
2010	Above & Beyond	Best Global DJ	Nominated
2010	Above & Beyond	Best Producer	Nominated
2010	Above & Beyond	Best Artist (Group)	Nominated
2010	Above & Beyond (for Trance Around the World)	Best Radio Mix Show DJ	Nominated
2010	Anjunabeats Volume 7	Best Full Length DJ Mix	Nominated
2010	Trance Around the World	Best Podcast	Nominated
2010	Anjunabeats	Best Global Record Label	Nominated
2011	Above & Beyond	Best European DJ	Nominated
2011	Above & Beyond	Best Artist (Group)	Nominated
2011	Above & Beyond (for Trance Around the World)	Best Radio Mix Show DJ	Nominated
2011	Anjunabeats Volume 8	Best Full Length DJ Mix	Nominated
2011	Trance Around the World	Best Podcast	Nominated
2012	Above & Beyond	Best European DJ	Nominated
2012	Above & Beyond	Best Artist (Group)	Nominated
2012	"Sun & Moon" (featuring Richard Bedford)	Best Trance Track	Nominated
2012	Above & Beyond (for Trance Around the World)	Best Radio Mix Show DJ	Nominated
2012	Anjunabeats	Best Global Record Label	Nominated
2013	Above & Beyond	Best European DJ	Nominated
2014	Above & Beyond	Best Artist (Group)	Nominated
2014	Above & Beyond	Best Trance DJ	Nominated
2014	"Walter White"	Best Trance Track	Nominated
2014	Above & Beyond (for Group Therapy Radio)	Best Podcast or Radio Mixshow DJ	Nominated
2014	Anjunabeats Volume 10	Best Compilation or Full Length DJ Mix	Nominated
2015	Above & Beyond	Best Trance DJ	Nominated
2015	Anjunabeats	Best Global Record Label	Nominated
2016	Above & Beyond	Best Trance DJ	Nominated
2016	Above & Beyond	Best Artist (Group)	Nominated
2016	Blue Sky Action (featuring Alex Vargas)	Best Trance Track	Nominated
2016	Above & Beyond (for Group Therapy Radio)	Best Podcast or Radio Mixshow DJ	Nominated
2016	Anjunabeats	Best Global Music Label	Nominated
2019	Above & Beyond (for Common Ground)	Best Pop/Electronic Album	Won
2019	Above & Beyond	Best Male Artist (Trance)	Nominated
2019	Anjunabeats	Best Label	Nominated

=== Mixmag ===
Year	Nominated Act	Category	Result
2012	Above & Beyond	Greatest Dance Act of All Time	#19

=== NRJ DJ Awards ===
Year	Awards	Category	Recipient	Outcome	Ref
2016	NRJ DJ Awards	Best Collaboration of the Year	Above & Beyond	Nominated	

== See also ==
- Anjunabeats
- OceanLab
