= Acoustic (Above & Beyond album) =

Compilation album by Above & Beyond
- Released: 28 January 2014
- Genre: Pop rock; downtempo
- Label: Anjunabeats
- Producer: Bob Bradley

Above & Beyond chronology
Group Therapy (2011)	Acoustic (2014)	We Are All We Need (2015)

Acoustic is an acoustic compilation album by British progressive trance group Above & Beyond, released on 28 January 2014 by Anjunabeats. The album comprises acoustic versions of previously released music, from Group Therapy and Sirens of the Sea.

== Track listing ==
No.	Title	Writer(s)	Length
1.	"Miracle"	Jonathan Grant; Anthony McGuinness; Paavo Siljamaki; Justine Suissa	4:53
2.	"You Got to Go"	Grant; McGuinness; Siljamaki; Zoe Johnston	5:38
3.	"Satellite / Stealing Time"	Grant; McGuinness; Siljamaki; Suissa	5:04
4.	"Thing Called Love"	Grant; McGuinness; Siljamaki	4:20
5.	"Can't Sleep"	Grant; McGuinness; Siljamaki	4:40
6.	"Sun & Moon"	Grant; McGuinness; Siljamaki; Suissa; Sorcha Shephard	4:48
7.	"Good for Me"	Grant; McGuinness; Siljamaki; Johnston	6:04
8.	"Sirens of the Sea"	Grant; McGuinness; Siljamaki; Suissa	4:50
9.	"Love Is Not Enough"	Grant; McGuinness; Siljamaki; Andrew Bayer; Johnston	5:31
10.	"On a Good Day"	Grant; McGuinness; Siljamaki; Suissa	4:23
11.	"Alone Tonight"	Grant; McGuinness; Siljamaki	4:37
12.	"Making Plans"	Grant; McGuinness; Siljamaki	4:22

== Charts ==
Chart (2014)	Peak position
Belgian Albums (Ultratop Flanders)	155
UK Albums (Official Charts)	57
US Billboard 200	70
US Independent Albums (Billboard)	13

Chart (2023)	Peak position
Belgian Albums (Ultratop Flanders)	140
