= OceanLab =

British vocal trance group

- Origin: London, United Kingdom
- Genres: Uplifting trance, vocal trance, IDM, progressive trance, progressive house
- Years active: 2000–2010, 2015–present
- Label: Anjunabeats
- Members: Jono Grant; Justine Suissa; Paavo Siljamäki; Tony McGuinness

OceanLab (or Above & Beyond presents OceanLab) is a vocal trance group formed in 2000 in London. The group consists of vocalist Justine Suissa and the three members of Above & Beyond: Jono Grant, Paavo Siljamäki, and Tony McGuinness.

== History ==
=== 2000s ===
The group's first single, released in 2001, was "Clear Blue Water", which was remixed by several artists, including Ferry Corsten. The track peaked at #48 in the UK Singles Chart in April 2002. The second single, "Sky Falls Down", was released in 2002 and remixed by Armin van Buuren. The third single, "Beautiful Together", was released in 2003 and was remixed by Seraque, Silvester, and Signum. Their fourth single, "Satellite", was playlisted by BBC Radio 1 and reached #19 in the UK charts in May 2004, the group's highest-charting single to date.

On 7 April 2008, the single "Sirens of the Sea" was released, including remixes by Sonorous, Cosmic Gate, Maor Levi, and Kyau & Albert.

OceanLab's debut album, Sirens of the Sea, was released on 21 July 2008, preceded a week earlier by the single "Miracle". Included on the single are Above and Beyond's Club Mix of tracks, as well as remixes by Martin Roth, Michael Cassette, and Fletch. Sirens of the Sea Remixed, released in 2009, included remixes of OceanLab singles "Satellite", "Sky Falls Down", and "Clear Blue Water".

=== 2010s ===
On 30 January 2014, McGuinness and Siljamäki confirmed via Reddit that the artist name OceanLab would no longer be used on future productions, with Justine Suissa now being identified as a part of Above & Beyond.

After a one-year hiatus, the group returned with a new single at Above & Beyond's ABGT150 concert in September 2015. On 26 September 2015, they premiered a new OceanLab production at ABGT150 in Sydney, entitled Another Chance. It was released as a single containing the original mix and the Above & Beyond Club Mix on 4 November 2016.

On 24 September 2016 Above & Beyond previewed a new OceanLab production, "Alright Now", at ABGT200 in the Ziggo Dome, Amsterdam. The Above & Beyond Club Mix of the track was originally released on Anjunabeats Volume 13, and later released as a single on 12 May 2017. It was included on Above & Beyond's 2018 album, Common Ground.

=== 2020s ===
After a four-year break due to internal conflict, Justine and Above & Beyond collaborated to release "Almost Home" in 2021.

In 2023, a limited edition music set was released, to commemorate 20 years of the band's existence.

== Discography ==
=== Albums ===
- 2008 Sirens of the Sea
- 2009 Sirens of the Sea Remixed

=== Singles ===
- 2001 "Clear Blue Water" - UK #48 (in 2002)
- 2002 "Sky Falls Down"
- 2003 "Beautiful Together"
- 2004 "Satellite" - UK #19
- 2008 "Sirens of the Sea"
- 2008 "Miracle"
- 2008 "Breaking Ties"
- 2008 "Come Home"
- 2009 "On A Good Day"
- 2009 "Lonely Girl"
- 2010 "On A Good Day (Metropolis)"
- 2016 "Another Chance"

=== Remixes ===
- 2001 Teaser: - "When Love Breaks Down" (OceanLab Remix)
- 2002 Ascension: - "For a Lifetime" (OceanLab Remix)
