= Group Therapy (Above & Beyond album) =

Studio album by Above & Beyond
- Released: 6 June 2011
- Recorded: 2011
- Genres: Trance, progressive trance, progressive house
- Length: 80:48
- Label: Anjunabeats
- Producers: Above & Beyond, Andrew Bayer

Above & Beyond chronology
Tri-State (2006)	Group Therapy (2011)	Acoustic (2014)

Singles from Group Therapy
- 1. "Sun & Moon" Released: 20 March 2011; 2. "Thing Called Love" Released: 12 June 2011; 3. "You Got to Go" Released: 2 October 2011; 4. "Every Little Beat" Released: 17 December 2011; 5. "Love Is Not Enough" Released: 19 March 2012; 6. "On My Way To Heaven" Released: 25 June 2012; 7. "Alchemy" Released: 19 November 2012; 8. "Black Room Boy" Released: 25 February 2013

Professional ratings
Review scores
Source	Rating
About.com	4/5 stars
AllMusic	3/5 stars

Group Therapy is the second studio album by British progressive trance group Above & Beyond. It was released on 6 June 2011 by Anjunabeats. The album features collaborations with Zoë Johnston and Richard Bedford.

== Track listing ==
- Arranged and produced by Above & Beyond. Additional production by Andrew Bayer.

No.	Title	Writer(s)	Length
1.	"Filmic"	Jono Grant, Tony McGuinness, Paavo Siljamäki	3:49
2.	"Alchemy" (featuring Zoë Johnston)	Grant, McGuinness, Siljamäki, Zoë Johnston	5:17
3.	"Sun & Moon" (featuring Richard Bedford)	Grant, McGuinness, Siljamäki, Justine Suissa, Sorcha Shepherd	5:25
4.	"You Got to Go" (featuring Zoë Johnston)	Grant, McGuinness, Siljamäki, Johnston	5:34
5.	"Black Room Boy" (vocals by Tony McGuinness and Richard Bedford)	Grant, McGuinness, Siljamäki, Andrew Bayer, Richard Bedford	6:10
6.	"Giving It Out" (featuring Zoë Johnston)	Grant, McGuinness, Siljamäki, Johnston	3:53
7.	"On My Way to Heaven" (featuring Richard Bedford)	Grant, McGuinness, Siljamäki	5:58
8.	"Prelude"	Grant, McGuinness, Siljamäki	5:44
9.	"Sun in Your Eyes"	Grant, McGuinness, Siljamäki	4:50
10.	"Love Is Not Enough" (featuring Zoë Johnston)	Grant, McGuinness, Siljamäki, Bayer	6:33
11.	"Every Little Beat" (featuring Richard Bedford)	Grant, McGuinness, Siljamäki, Bedford	6:00
12.	"Sweetest Heart" (featuring Zoë Johnston)	Grant, McGuinness, Siljamäki, Johnston	3:36
13.	"Thing Called Love" (featuring Richard Bedford)	Grant, McGuinness, Siljamäki	5:29
14.	"Only a Few Things" (featuring Zoë Johnston)	Grant, McGuinness, Siljamäki, Johnston	5:02
15.	"Eternal"	Grant, McGuinness, Siljamäki	2:53

iTunes UK & US deluxe edition bonus track
No.	Title	Length
16.	"Sun & Moon" (featuring Richard Bedford) (Beirut Demo)	7:24

Amazon UK bonus track & Google Play bonus track
No.	Title	Length
16.	"With Your Hope" (featuring Richard Bedford)	4:30

(*) denotes additional production

Limited Edition Collector's Book

At a one-time pressing of 1,000 copies, the Group Therapy Collector's Book was hand-signed by Above & Beyond members Jono, Tony and Paavo and included:

- 40-page hardback book with handwritten lyrics, images and sleeve notes
- Group Therapy album disc
- Bonus disc with Above & Beyond TV content, music videos of "Sun & Moon" and "Thing Called Love" and a 30-minute interview with the band

== Charts ==
Chart (2011)	Peak position
Australian Albums Chart	56
UK Albums Chart	49
US Billboard 200	163

== Release history ==
Region	Date	Format	Label
United Kingdom	6 June 2011	CD, digital download	Anjunabeats
Taiwan	6 June 2011	CD	High Note Records
United States	7 June 2011	CD, digital download	Ultra Records
Australia	10 June 2011	CD	Central Station
Netherlands	10 June 2011	CD	Ministry of Sound
