= Andrew Bayer =

American DJ and producer (born 1987)

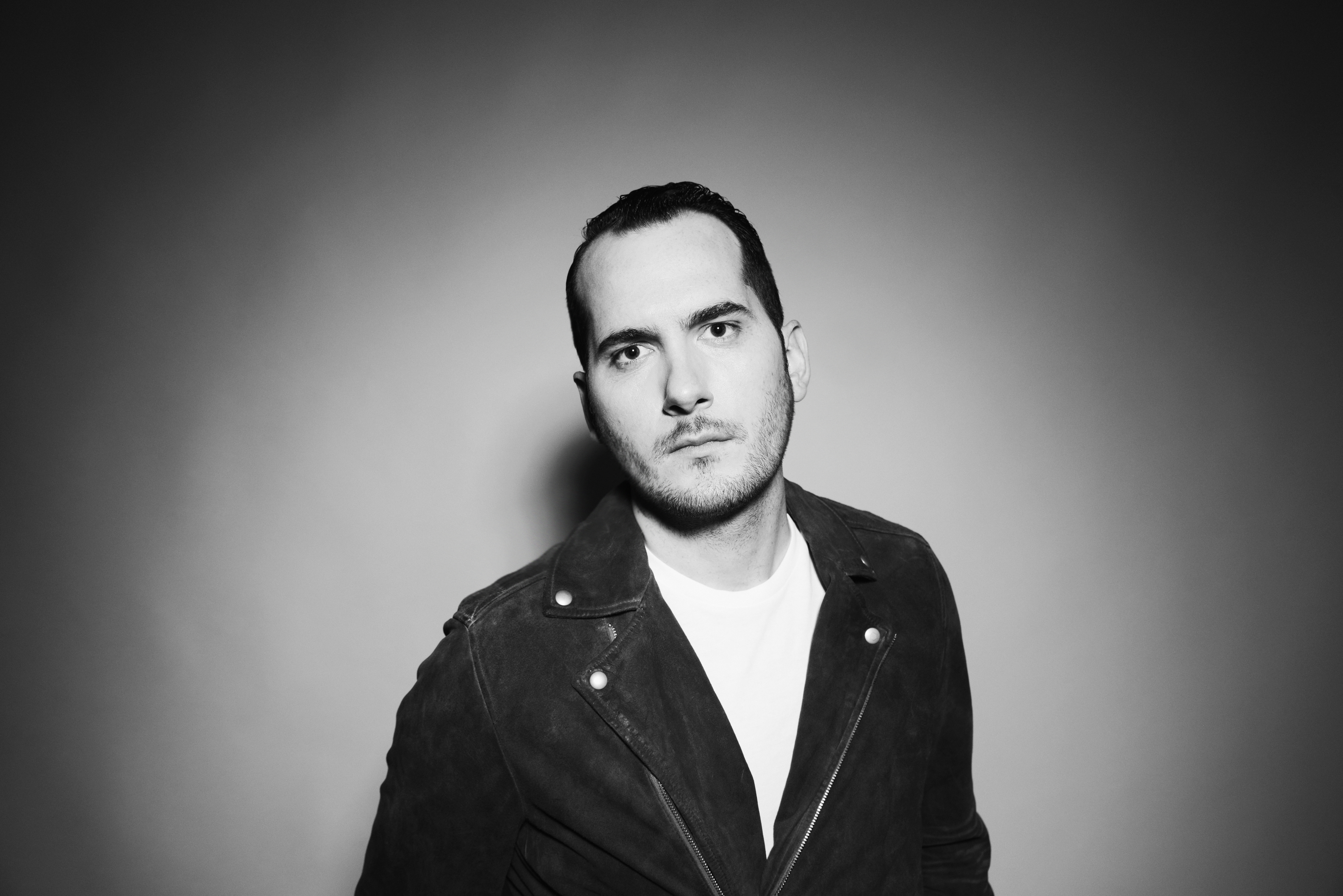
- Bayer in 2018

Background information
- Born: Andrew Michael Bayer; 1987 (age 38–39); Washington, D.C., US
- Genres: Trance; progressive house; ambient; electro house
- Occupations: DJ; producer
- Years active: 2009–present
- Labels: Anjunabeats; Anjunadeep

Andrew Michael Bayer (born 1987) is an American DJ and Grammy-nominated music producer. He is best known for working with Anjunabeats as a multi-genre artist and English deep house sublabel Anjunadeep.

Born in Washington, D.C., Bayer was piano-educated as a child before graduating with a degree in music synthesis at the Berklee College of Music. His first professional music projects involved working with Scottish producer Alan Nimmo as trance music duo Signalrunners and releasing multiple extended plays and remixes through Anjunadeep. Bayer's first studio album, It's Artificial, was released in 2011 and seen as a multi-genre musical record. His second album If It Were You, We'd Never Leave, which comprised a more downtempo sound, was released in 2013. The record was supported by lead single "Lose Sight" and peaked at number 19 on the US Dance charts. Bayer's third studio album, In My Last Life, was released in August 2018.

Besides being involved in Signalrunners, Bayer is also affiliated with musical trio Artificial, which was formed with producers Norin & Rad in 2013. Artificial has released two singles together, "Prototype" and "Stuck In Sa Calenta." Bayer has also released two extended plays in 2015, Do Androids Dream and Anamnesis, with the former peaking at number 11 on the US Dance charts.

For his production contributions to Above & Beyond's third studio album We Are All We Need, Bayer was nominated for the Grammy Award for Best Dance Recording in 2015 for the song "We're All We Need", and for his production contributions to Above & Beyond's fourth studio album Common Ground, Bayer was nominated for the same Grammy award in 2018 for the song "Northern Soul".

== Early life ==
Andrew Bayer was born in Washington, D.C. in 1987. He became interested in music at a young age and began playing the piano, after being forced into taking piano lessons by his parents. Bayer was initially a big fan of Michael Jackson and Paula Abdul as a child, before he was properly introduced to electronic music by trance DJs Tiësto and Ferry Corsten during his teenage years. He also cited his childhood experiences with the PlayStation program "MTV Music Generator" as his initial exposure to electronic music production; his early songs were positively received by his peers which had inspired him to improve his production ability. In 2001, at the age of 15, he started producing music professionally. Later, he studied music synthesis at the Berklee College of Music.

== Career ==
=== 2003—2009: Signalrunners ===
In 2003, he founded the music project Signalrunners with Alan Nimmo from Scotland. Between 2003 and 2008, they produced thirteen singles and extended plays including "Meet Me In Montauk", "Leaving London", "Aria Epica" and "These Shoulders," under Anjunabeats label in 2008. The duo founded the label Fraction Records.

=== 2010—2012: Anjunabeats signing and It's Artificial ===
After sending Above & Beyond multiple demos, they signed him in 2010 and released The Taxi Driver EP on Anjunadeep, later followed by the Distractions EP in 2011. He also released multiple remixes through Anjunadeep, some of which were remixed together with London-based producer James Grant. On July 25, 2011, he released his debut album It's Artificial on Anjunabeats. The album comprises tracks of many genres, including trance, glitch hop, dubstep, and techno. Bayer called the record a "turning point" in his career, in which he started to experiment with musical styles seen outside of traditional dance music. The album featured singles "Counting The Points" and "From The Earth."

=== 2013—2014: If It Were You, We'd Never Leave and collaborations ===
His second album, If It Were You, We'd Never Leave, also appeared on Anjunabeats in April 2013. Bayer called the album a "total experiment" and a "self-realization piece that slowly evolved" while citing his enviousness of hip-hop producers knack for sampling as the album's inspiration. He quoted particular pleasure in writing "selfish music" for the album as it was "music for [him] and about pictures and places in [his] life." The record included samples from Sufjan Stevens, Ane Brun, and Deb Talan. Compared to his first album, If It Were You, We'd Never Leave took a more downtempo path influenced by his time living in New York, consisting of tracks with trip hop, alternative pop, and modern classical compositions. Three singles were released for the record; lead single "Lose Sight" featuring Ane Brun, "Gaff's Eulogy," and "Need Your Love." Bayer released "It’s Going To Be Fine" as a free download on March 12, 2013 to promote the record.

He has worked with Above & Beyond on their second, third, and fourth studio albums, Group Therapy, We Are All We Need, and Common Ground. "We Are All We Need" peaked in the top 20 on charts in the United States, United Kingdom, Canada and Australia. Bayer also releases his solo and collaborative music regularly through their label Anjunabeats with his notable releases being three-track single "Need Your Love / England / Detuned", "Once Lydian," "Follow the Light" with Arty, and "Destiny" with London-based producer Ilan Bluestone.

In November 2013, Bayer unveiled a new musical project with American trance producers Norin & Rad titled Artificial. They premiered their first single "Prototype" during Above & Beyond's Group Therapy 050, which was later released on December 9, 2013 though Anjunabeats. During an interview with DJ Mag, Bayer revealed his long time friendship and behind-the-scene collaborations with Norin & Rad, stating: "Nick (Norin), Bruce (Rad) and I have been friends for a long time and we've always been collaborating behind the scene a bit [...] We finally asked ourselves, 'Why aren’t we working on tracks together?" He explained that Artificial's goal was to "retain musicality" while producing club-friendly big room house that "stays true to the melodic, uplifting sound of Anjunabeats." Following "Prototype," they released funky house single "Stuck In Sa Calenta" on March 10, 2014 with Bayer writing that the single was a result of a missed flight and three extra days in Ibiza spent producing the track.

=== 2015—2017: Do Androids Dream and Anamnesis ===
Bayer released a three-part EP in April 2015 titled Do Androids Dream, which also contained tracks "Super Human" and "Tomorrow Boys." He debuted the first two parts of Do Androids Dream during his performance at ABGT 100 on October 18, 2014 and later through Facebook on March 17, 2015. He embarked on an 11-city North American tour in support of the EP from April to May 2015. The EP peaked at number 11 on the US Dance charts.

Bayer's next trilogy-based EP Anamnesis was announced in October 2015 with monthly releases spanning from October to December 2015. Bayer, who was disappointed with the "uninspiring and boring arrangements" of EDM-era big room house music, aimed to restore the "messages and motifs" of trance and progressive music through the EP with his own musical style spin on it. The EP's first track, a progressive house single titled "Nobody Told Me," which was debuted on Group Therapy 150, was released on October 16, 2015. It was followed by "Celestial" on November 6, 2015 and "Memories" on December 4, 2015. To support the EP, a North American and Australian tour lasting from September to December 2015 was also announced by Bayer.

=== 2018: In My Last Life ===
In June 2018, Bayer released "Immortal Lover" as a single from his third studio album In My Last Life, which was released on August 24, 2018. The single featured vocalist Alison May. Bayer wrote in a statement to Billboard that the album would be taking an indie approach to its songs while focusing on lyrical writing, which had taken him a long time to feel comfortable with releasing since he was originally a trance artist. In July 2018, the album's second single titled "Your Eyes" was released, which featured the vocals of Ane Brun. The song incorporated trance and indietronica influences in its sound. The fourth single of the album "End of All Things," which again featured Alison May, was released on August 14, 2018. May quoted that the theme of "End of All Things" revolved around the uncertainty of "what happens when [people] pass away," when one can "reach the conclusion that there is life before" and "take solace in being part of a great plan." Bayer provided cinema tickets for listeners who had pre-ordered the album to listen to In My Last Life while blindfolded, which he felt would help listeners to "focus in on the lyrical content and the actual story." Bayer embarked on a three-month tour to support the album from October to December 2018.

=== 2019—present: Parallels & Duality ===
In July 2019, Bayer announced a new musical project entitled Parallels. It will be an EP which is a return to "analog club sounds". The EP was released in Fall 2019, with Bayer supporting the release with a tour across North America beginning September 2019. The first single from the EP, "True Feelin'" was released on August 8, 2019. In June 2022, Bayer announced a double album, Duality set for release via Anjunabeats. The first record was released on August 12 before its counterpart releases on October 28.

== Personal life ==
Bayer is openly gay, and has been married to his husband since 2015.

== Discography ==
Studio albums

- It's Artificial (2011)
- If It Were You, We'd Never Leave (2013)
- In My Last Life (2018)
- Duality (2022)
- A Light That Guides Weary Travelers Home (2026)

== Awards and nominations ==
=== Grammy Awards ===
Year	Nominee / work	Award	Result
2015	"We're All We Need" (featuring Zoë Johnston)	Best Dance Recording	Nominated
2018	"Northern Soul" (featuring Richard Bedford)	Best Dance Recording	Nominated
