= Richard Bedford =

British singer-songwriter

- Born: Halifax, West Yorkshire, England
- Genres: Trance
- Occupations: Singer-songwriter, musician
- Instrument: Vocals
- Years active: 2005–present
- Labels: Anjunabeats, Armada

Richard Bedford is a Grammy Award-nominated British singer-songwriter.

== Biography ==
Bedford is widely known for his vocal work in electronic dance music (EDM) and trance including his collaborations with Above & Beyond on their 2011 album Group Therapy, their 2006 album Tri-state, Armin van Buuren's 2013 album Intense IDMA-nominated singles "Alone Tonight" and "Sun & Moon" & Grammy Nominated single "Northern Soul". Having started life as a keyboard player in various bands, Bedford turned to song-writing and singing in 1998, before working with Above & Beyond on their debut album Tri-State in early 2005. Bedford also features on four songs on the 2025 album Bigger Than All Of Us by Above & Beyond.

Richard performed on Armin van Buuren's "Armin Only Intense World Tour 2013/2014."

== Discography ==
Vocal Collaborations

- Above & Beyond – Alone Tonight (Anjunabeats)
- Above & Beyond – Stealing Time (Anjunabeats)
- Above & Beyond – Liquid Love (Anjunabeats)
- Above & Beyond featuring Richard Bedford – Sun & Moon (Anjunabeats)
- Above & Beyond featuring Richard Bedford – Thing Called Love (Anjunabeats)
- Above & Beyond featuring Richard Bedford – With Your Hope (Anjunabeats)
- Above & Beyond featuring Richard Bedford – Every Little Beat (Anjunabeats)
- Above & Beyond featuring Richard Bedford – On My Way to Heaven (Anjunabeats)
- Above & Beyond featuring Tony McGuinness and Richard Bedford – Black Room Boy (Anjunabeats)
- Armin van Buuren feat Richard Bedford – Love Never Came (Armada Music/Positiva)
- Judge Jules and Richard Bedford – Burn in the Sun (Judgement Recordings)
- Above & Beyond featuring Richard Bedford – Northern Soul (Anjunabeats)
- Above & Beyond featuring Richard Bedford – Happiness Amplified (Anjunabeats)
- Above & Beyond featuring Richard Bedford – Bittersweet & Blue (Anjunabeats)
- Matt Fax & Richard Bedford – Greatest Thing (Colorize Enhanced)
- Roman Messer & Richard Bedford – Breathe (Suanda Music)
- TEKNO, DJ T.H. & Richard Bedford – Make U Mine (inHarmony)
- Scorz & Richard Bedford - Change The Story (Armada Music)
- Aly & Fila x Chapter47 x Richard Bedford – Edge of Tomorrow (FSOE)
- Above & Beyond featuring Richard Bedford – Heart of Stone (Anjunabeats)
- Above & Beyond featuring Richard Bedford - Start A Fire (Anjunabeats)

Writing Only Collaborations

- Dennis Sheperd & Cold Blue – Freefalling (feat. Chloe Langley) (High Contrast)
- Dennis Sheperd – Left of the World (Euphonic & High Contrast)
- Airborne Cities – All I Need (Believe Digital)
- Dennis Sheperd and Jonathan Mendelsohn – Bring Me Back (High Contrast)
- Dennis Sheperd – Feeder (High Contrast)
- Dennis Sheperd – Out in the Cold (High Contrast)
- Mike Shiver feat Bo Bruce – Still Here (Armada)
- Mike Shiver – Back to Life (Ride Recordings)

Albums:

- Above & Beyond – Tri-State (Anjunabeats Records)
- Above & Beyond – Group Therapy (Anjunabeats Records)
- Dennis Sheperd – A Tribute to Life (High Contrast)
- Armin van Buuren – Intense (Armada/Positiva)
- Above & Beyond – Acoustic 2 (Anjunabeats Records)
- Above & Beyond – Common Ground (Anjunabeats Records)
- Matt Fax – Progressions (Colorize Enhanced)
- Roman Messer - Written in the Stars (Suanda Music)
- Above & Beyond – Bigger Than All Of Us (Anjunabeats Records)
