= Tony McGuinness (musician) =

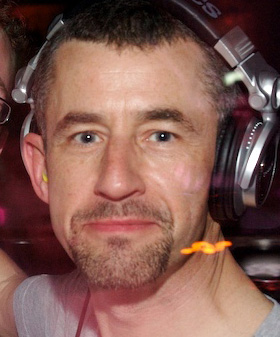

Background information
- Also known as: Tony McGuinness, T. McGuinness
- Born: Anthony Patrick James McGuinness
- Origin: England
- Genres: Trance, post-punk
- Occupations: Guitarist, keyboardist, songwriter, trance DJ, trance producer
- Years active: 1988–present
- Label: Anjunabeats
- Member of: Above & Beyond, Sad Lovers & Giants
- Website: www.anjunabeats.com

Anthony Patrick James McGuinness is a British trance musician. He is known for being in the electronic music group Above & Beyond. He is also a guitarist and songwriter of the indie band Sad Lovers & Giants.

== Biography ==
Tony McGuinness plays guitar with English indie band Sad Lovers & Giants, appearing on three albums between 1988 and 2002 and is still an active member having toured US and Europe regularly with them since 2009.

McGuinness was an advertising executive working for Bosse, Massimi & Podia (BMP) until, in 1989, he joined the Warner Music Group as a marketing specialist. He won awards for his campaigns for Madonna, R.E.M., Mike Oldfield, and Simply Red. While working at Warner, McGuinness shifted away from alternative rock towards electronic dance music. He worked as A&R for a number of dance artists, including William Orbit and Hysteric Ego. McGuinness and his brother Liam teamed up to create electronic dance music under the alias Nitromethane in the early 2000s.

While still working at Warner, McGuinness was asked to remix Chakra's "Home". McGuinness approached Anjunabeats (Jono Grant and Paavo Siljamäki) to work on the remix together. The collaboration led to the creation of Above & Beyond, consisting of McGuinness, Grant, and Siljamäki. He left Warner music in 2001 to focus on both Above & Beyond and Oceanlab.

Above & Beyond's second studio album, Group Therapy, features McGuinness' first ever vocal single (with Richard Bedford) on the track "Black Room Boy".

In 2024 McGuinness released the solo rock album Salt, which he had written 30 years previously in the 1990s.

== Discography ==
=== Singles ===
- 2002 Time to Die (as Nitromethane)

Productions as a part of Above & Beyond:

- 2002 Far from in Love
- 2004 No One on Earth
- 2005 Air for Life
- 2006 Alone Tonight
- 2006 Can't Sleep
- 2007 Good for Me
- 2007 Home
- 2009 Anjunabeach
- 2010 Anphonic
- 2011 Sun & Moon
- 2011 Thing Called Love
- 2011 You Got To Go
- 2011 Formula Rossa
- 2011 Every Little Beat
- 2012 Love Is Not Enough
- 2012 On My Way To Heaven
- 2012 Alchemy
- 2013 Walter White
- 2014 Sticky Fingers
- 2014 You Got to Believe
- 2014 Blue Sky Action
- 2014 We're All We Need
- 2015 All Over the World
- 2015 Peace of Mind
- 2015 Counting Down the Days
- 2015 Fly to New York

Productions as a part of Tranquility Base:

- 2001 Razorfish
- 2004 Surrender
- 2005 Getting Away
- 2007 Oceanic
- 2007 Buzz

Productions as a part of OceanLab:

- 2001 Clear Blue Water
- 2002 Sky Falls Down
- 2003 Beautiful Together
- 2004 Satellite
- 2004 Sky Falls Down

Productions as a part of Rollerball:

- 2003 Albinoni
- 2004 Albinoni (Remix)

Production with Spencer Brown

- 2021 Santorini

=== Remixes ===
- 2000 What It Feels Like for a Girl (as Above & Beyond)
- 2002 M (as Above & Beyond)
- 2004 Sand in My Shoes / Don't Leave Home (as Above & Beyond)
- 2006 Black Is the Colour (as Above & Beyond)
- 2007 Home (as Tony)

Anjunabeats:

- 2003 Anjunabeats Volume One
- 2004 Anjunabeats Volume Two
- 2005 Anjunabeats Volume Three
- 2006 Anjunabeats Volume Four
- 2007 Anjunabeats Volume Five
- 2008 Anjunabeats100 + From Goa to Rio
- 2008 Anjunabeats Volume Six
- 2009 Anjunadeep:01
- 2009 Anjunabeats Volume 7
- 2010 Anjunabeats Volume 8
- 2011 10 Years of Anjunabeats

=== Albums ===
Albums with Above & Beyond:

- 2006 Tri-State
- 2008 Sirens of the Sea (as Above & Beyond presents OceanLab)
- 2011 Group Therapy
- 2014 Above & Beyond Acoustic
- 2015 We Are All We Need
- 2018 Common Ground
- 2025 Bigger Than All Of Us

Solo:

- 2024 Salt

=== Other productions ===
Upon becoming a member of the band Sad Lovers & Giants in 1986, Tony McGuinness had a successful career in the music industry. Their discography includes the following albums:

- 1988 Epic Garden Music
- 1988 Feeding the Flame
- 1988 Les Années Vertes
- 1988 Sleep / A Reflected Dream
- 1988 The Mirror Test
- 1990 Headland
- 1991 Les Années Vertes
- 1991 Treehouse Poetry
- 1996 The Best of E-Mail from Eternity
- 1999 La Dolce Vita (Live in Lausanne)
- 2000 Headland & Treehouse Poetry
- 2002 Melting in the Fullness of Time
- 2018 Mission Creep

As a part of Oceanlab, Above & Beyond, Anjunabeats, Rollerball and Tranquility Base, Tony McGuinness produced numerous tracks as a team under the label Anjunabeats.
