= 10 Years (Armin van Buuren album) =

Compilation album by Armin van Buuren
- Released: 11 November 2006
- Genre: Trance
- Length: 160:11
- Label: Armada
- Producer: Armin van Buuren

Armin van Buuren chronology
| A State of Trance 2006 (2006) | 10 Years (2006) | A State of Trance 2007 (2007) |

10 Years is a compilation album by Dutch DJ and record producer Armin van Buuren. It was released on 11 November 2006 by Armada Music. It spent twelve weeks on the Dutch album chart, peaking at number 45. It also spent five weeks on the Billboard Top Dance/Electronic Albums chart, peaking at number 20.

Van Buuren said that 10 Years was "not a 'best of' album", but "more a selection of previously unreleased and exclusive re-mixes". He also said that the album's main purposes were "tying up loose ends" and "a little celebration of 10 years work as a producer".

== Track listing ==
Disc one
| No. | Title | Length |
|---|---|---|
| 1. | "Hymne" | 2:51 |
| 2. | "Sail" | 9:13 |
| 3. | "Love You More" (featuring Racoon) | 9:02 |
| 4. | "Communication Part 3" | 8:28 |
| 5. | "Yet Another Day" (featuring Ray Wilson) | 6:39 |
| 6. | "Burned With Desire" (featuring Justine Suissa) | 7:44 |
| 7. | "4 Elements" | 9:18 |
| 8. | "The Sound of Goodbye" (Dark Matter Remix) | 6:42 |
| 9. | "Clear Blue Moon" | 7:27 |
| 10. | "Blue Fear" | 7:54 |
| 11. | "Exhale" (System F featuring Armin van Buuren) | 4:38 |

Disc two
| No. | Title | Length |
|---|---|---|
| 1. | "Who is Watching" (featuring Nadia Ali) (Tonedepth Remix) | 11:19 |
| 2. | "Saturday Night" (vs. Herman Brood) | 7:45 |
| 3. | "Zocalo" (featuring Gabriel & Dresden) | 8:40 |
| 4. | "This World Is Watching Me" (vs. Rank 1 featuring Kush) | 7:48 |
| 5. | "Sunspot" (featuring Airwave) | 6:01 |
| 6. | "Touch Me" | 9:09 |
| 7. | "Simple Things" (featuring Justine Suissa) | 7:08 |
| 8. | "Shivers" (Alex M.O.R.P.H. Red Light Dub) | 6:47 |
| 9. | "Wall of Sound" (featuring Justine Suissa) (Airbase presents Parc Remix) | 8:09 |
| 10. | "Intruder" (vs. M.I.K.E.) | 7:29 |
