= Bigger Than All of Us =

Bigger Than All Of Us

Studio album by Above & Beyond
- Released: 18 July 2025
- Recorded: 2024
- Genre: Trance
- Label: Anjunabeats
- Producers: Above & Beyond; Vladimir Ershov; Riccardo Derio

Above & Beyond chronology
Common Ground (2018)	Bigger Than All Of Us (2025)

Bigger Than All Of Us is the fifth studio album by British progressive trance group Above & Beyond. It was released on 18 July 2025 on Anjunabeats. The album is their first studio album since Common Ground (2018) and includes appearances from frequent collaborators Richard Bedford, Justine Suissa, and Zoë Johnston plus new guest vocalists Victoria Horn and Malou.

== Release and promotion ==
Above & Beyond announced their next album on 19 March 2025, Bigger Than All of Us. The first single from the album, Quicksand was released on 21 March 2025.

On 16 July 2025, Apple Music's YouTube channel published a 43-minute long interview conducted by Zane Lowe with the trio, discussing the album. After a seven-year gap between studio albums, the trio spoke about reconnecting with their creative core, managing burnout, and reimagining their relationship with fans and touring life. The band emphasized the role of community in shaping the album’s message.

Tony McGuinness explained the title by highlighting the global fanbase they’ve built—what they lovingly call the Anjunafamily. According to McGuinness, their journey has always remained “fan-focused,” and the new record aims to reflect that shared experience. Throughout the interview, McGuinness and Siljamäki discussed the toll of years on the road, emphasizing the need to slow down and make touring more sustainable.

== Track listing ==
No.	Title	Writer(s)	Producer(s)	Length
1.	"Stepping In"	Jonathan "Jono" Grant; Tony McGuinness; Paavo Siljamaki	Above & Beyond; Vladimir Ershov^{[a]}	4:08
2.	"Start A Fire" (featuring Richard Bedford)	Grant; McGuinness; Siljamaki; Richard Bedford	Above & Beyond; Bedford; Ershov^{[a]}	3:49
3.	"Carry Me Home" (featuring Zoe Johnston)	Grant; Siljamaki; McGuinness; Zoe Johnston	Above & Beyond; Johnston; Riccardo Derio^{[a]}	4:16
4.	"Everywhere I Go"	Grant; McGuinness; Siljamaki	Above & Beyond; Andrew Bayer^{[a]}	4:12
5.	"When You Believe" (featuring Victoria Horn)	Grant; McGuinness; Siljamaki; Horn	Above & Beyond; Victoria Horn^{[a]}	5:00
6.	"Quicksand (Don't Go)" (featuring Zoe Johnston)	Grant; McGuinness; Siljamaki; Johnston	Above & Beyond; Johnston; Derio^{[a]}	5:00
7.	"Bigger Than All Of Us" (featuring Justine Suissa)	Grant; McGuinness; Siljamaki; Justine Suissa	Above & Beyond; Johnston; Suissa^{[a]}	4:20
8.	"Blood From A Stone" (featuring Richard Bedford)	Grant; McGuinness; Siljamaki; Bedford	Above & Beyond; Bedford; Ershov^{[a]}	5:27
9.	"Into The Light"	Grant; McGuinness; Siljamaki	Above & Beyond; Bedford; Ershov^{[a]}	1:51
10.	"Letting Go" (featuring Malou)	Grant; McGuinness; Siljamaki; Malou Beling	Above & Beyond; Derio; Malou Beling; Toby Jacob; Ershov^{[a]}	3:19
11.	"Here Before" (featuring Opposite The Other & Oliver Smith)	Grant; McGuinness; Siljamaki; Oliver Smith; Samuel Burger	Above & Beyond; Oliver Smith^{[a]}	4:20
12.	"Sailing Off The End Of The World" (featuring Richard Bedford)	Grant; McGuinness; Siljamaki	Above & Beyond; Ershov^{[a]}	4:24
13.	"Ride At Dawn" (featuring Zoe Johnston)	Grant; McGuinness; Siljamaki; Johnston	Above & Beyond; Derio^{[a]}	4:06
14.	"Heartland" (featuring Justine Suissa)	Grant; McGuinness; Siljamaki; Suissa	Above & Beyond; Suissa^{[a]}	3:37
15.	"'Til I'm Home" (featuring Richard Bedford)	Grant; McGuinness; Siljamaki; Bedford	Above & Beyond; Derio^{[a]}	3:41
16.	"Lullaby" (featuring Zoe Johnston)	Grant; McGuinness; Siljamaki; Johnston	Above & Beyond; Ershov^{[a]}	5:48

Notes

- ^{^[a]} signifies an additional producer

== Charts ==
=== Weekly charts ===
Chart (2025)	Peak position
UK Dance Albums (Official Charts)	2
