= Alright Now =

Alright Now or All Right Now may refer to:

- "All Right Now", a single by English rock band Free
- All Right Now (album), a 1986 debut album by Pepsi & Shirlie
- "Alright Now" (song), a song by trance group Above & Beyond and singer-songwriter Justine Suissa
- Alright Now (TV series), a British rock music television series
- Alright Now (film), a 2018 film starring Cobie Smulders

== See also ==
- I'm Alright Now, a 1967 Australian TV variety show
- "It's Alright Now", a single by UK band The Beloved
