= Communication (Armin van Buuren song) =

1999 composition by Armin van Buuren

Single by Armin

from the album 76
- Released: 19 July 1999; 2000 (Part 2); 2 April 2007 (Part 3)
- Recorded: April 1999
- Studio: Armin's parents home, Leiden
- Genre: Uplifting trance
- Length: 3:44 (Radio Edit); 9:35 (Original 12" Mix); 8:29 (Part 3 Original Mix)
- Label: Cyber; Combined Forces; Armind; Armada
- Songwriter: Armin van Buuren
- Producer: Armin

Armin singles chronology
"Blue Fear" (1997)	"Communication" (1999)	"Yet Another Day" (2002)

"Communication Part 3"
- Taken from the compilation 10 Years

Armin van Buuren singles chronology
"This World Is Watching Me" (2007)	"Communication Part 3" (2007)	"Rush Hour" (2007)

"Communication" is an instrumental composition by Dutch DJ and producer Armin. It was initially released on 19 July 1999 as 12" vinyl in the Netherlands by Cyber Records. A vocal version of the track featuring Carmen Van Den Brakel was released the next year. The track is known as one of the favourite of Armin van Buuren's fanbase. The track reached a notable success in the United Kingdom. It is the first single from Armin's first studio album, 76.

Armin continued then to produce remixes of the track, including "Communication Part 3" released on 2 April 2007 which is the fourth single of Armin's compilation 10 Years.

== Background and release ==
In an interview with Musikexpress, Armin explained that he produced the track alone for 2 days in his parents' house of Leiden. He declared that he was inspired by Speedy J's Ginger album.

"Communication" was first released in the Netherlands in 1999 on Cyber Records. The track later became van Buuren's first single from his debut studio album 76. In February 2000, it reached number 18 on the UK Singles Chart and number 2 on the UK Dance Singles Chart.

A second version, "Communication Part 2", was released in 2000, followed by "Communication Part 3" in 2007. In 2013, van Buuren released Communication Part 3 (Remixes), featuring remixes by James Dymond, John Askew, Faruk Sabanci and Tomas Heredia. In 2024, Music on Vinyl, Armada Music and van Buuren issued Communication Part 1–3 on vinyl to mark the track's 25th anniversary.

== Music video ==
An animated music video was realised for the track 12 years after its official release. It was published on 24 November 2009 by Armada Music's Youtube channel. It shows a robot in front of a conveyor belt fixing metal plates on the wall with Armin van Buuren's logo. Later the robots shares some data towards satellite dishes. At the end, the robot plays the UK CD single of "Communication" was created by Ben Liebrand.

== Track listing ==
Netherlands - 12" - Cyber (CR033)

1. "Communication" (Original Mix) – 9:35
2. "Communication" (Vincent de Moor Mix) – 7:25

Netherlands - CD - Combined Forces

1. "Communication" (Pronti & Kalmani Vocal Radio Edit) – 3:44
2. "Communication" (Pronti & Kalmani Instrumental Radio Edit) – 3:42
3. "Communication" (Original 12" Version) – 9:35
4. "Communication" (Vincent de Moor Remix) – 7:25
5. "Communication" (Quake Remix) - 8:45
6. "Communication" (Jon Vesta Remix) - 8:56

Europe - CD - Combined Forces

1. "Communication" (Pronti & Kalmani Vocal Radio Edit) – 3:44
2. "Communication" (Original Version) – 9:34

UK - 12" - AM PM (12AMPM129)

1. "Communication" (Original 12" Mix) – 6:44
2. "Communication" (Jon Vesta Remix) – 6:07
3. "Communication" (Quake Remake) - 6:59

UK - CD - AM PM (CDAMPM129)

1. "Communication" (Radio Edit) – 3:28
2. "Communication" (Quake Radio Edit) – 2:38
3. "Communication" (Original 12" Mix) – 6:44
4. "Communication" (Quake Remake) – 6:59

"Communication Part 2" - Netherlands - 12" - Cyber (CR036)

1. "Communication" (Armin van Buuren's Remake) – 9:35
2. "Communication" (Ben Liebrand Electromix) – 6:21

"Communication Part 3" - Netherlands - 12" & Digital download - Armind (ARMD1037)

1. "Communication Part 3" (Original Mix) – 8:29
2. "Communication Part 3" (Coldware Cold Remix) – 8:17

"Communication Part 3" (Remixes) - Netherlands- Digital download - Armind (ARMD1141)

1. "Communication Part 3" (John Askew Remix) – 7:06
2. "Communication Part 3" (James Dymond Remix) – 7:49
3. "Communication Part 3" (Tomas Heredia Remix) – 7:20
4. "Communication Part 3" (Faruk Sabanci Remix) – 6:30
5. "Communication Part 3" (John Askew Radio Edit) – 4:20
6. "Communication Part 3" (James Dymond Radio Edit) – 5:04
7. "Communication Part 3" (Faruk Sabanci Radio Edit) – 4:02
8. "Communication Part 3" (Tomas Heredia Radio Edit) – 4:04

2013 Re-issue - Netherlands - Digital download - Armada digital (ARDI3345)

1. "Communication" – 3:19
2. "Communication" (Album Mix) – 4:16
3. "Communication" (Original Mix) – 9:40

Paul Oakenfold Full on Fluoro Mix - UK - Digital download - Perfecto (PRFCT063)

1. "Communication" (Paul Oakenfold Full on Fluoro Mix) – 7:40

Paul Oakenfold Full on Fluoro Mixes - UK - Digital download - Perfecto (PRFCT063A)

1. "Communication" (Paul Oakenfold Full on Fluoro Radio Edit) – 3:16
2. "Communication" (Paul Oakenfold Full on Fluoro Mix) - 7:40

David Gravell Remix - Netherlands - Digital download - Armind 1330

1. "Communication" (David Gravell Extended Remix) - 4:54

David Gravell Remixes - Netherlands - Digital download - Armind 1330B

1. "Communication" (David Gravell Remix) - 2:57
2. "Communication" (David Gravell Extended Remix) - 4:54

== Charts ==
Chart (2000)	Peak position
Netherlands (Dutch Top 40)	14
Netherlands (Single Top 100)	95
UK Singles (Official Charts)	18
UK Physical Singles (Official Charts)	18
UK Dance (Official Charts)	2

== Release history ==
Year	Title	Region	Format	Label	Ref.
1999	"Communication"	Netherlands	12-inch vinyl	Cyber Records	
2000	"Communication"	United Kingdom	CD, 12-inch vinyl	AM PM	
2000	"Communication Part 2"	Netherlands	12-inch vinyl	Cyber Records	
2007	"Communication Part 3"	Netherlands	12-inch vinyl, digital download	Armind	
2013	Communication Part 3 (Remixes)	Worldwide	Digital download	Armind	
2024	Communication Part 1–3	Worldwide	Vinyl	Music on Vinyl, Armada Music	
