= This World Is Watching Me =

2007 single by Armin van Buuren

Single by Armin van Buuren vs. Rank 1 featuring Kush

from the album 10 Years
- Released: 22 January 2007
- Studio: Armada Studios, Amsterdam
- Genre: Progressive trance
- Length: 3:25 (radio edit); 7:48 (extended mix)
- Label: Armind; Armada; Ultra
- Songwriters: Armin van Buuren; Benno de Goeij; Sascha Collisson; Zoe Durrant; Pete Kirtley
- Producers: Armin van Buuren; Rank 1; Sascha Collisson

Armin van Buuren singles chronology
"Saturday Night" (2006)	"This World Is Watching Me" (2007)	"Communication Part 3" (2007)

Rank 1 singles chronology
"Opus 17" / "Top Gear" (2005)	"This World Is Watching Me" (2007)	"Life Less Ordinary" (2007)

Kush singles chronology
"This World Is Watching Me" (2007)	"Wanna Be Your Girl (Bittersweet)" (2008)

"This World Is Watching Me" is a song by Dutch disc jockey and producer Armin van Buuren and production band Rank 1. It features English band Kush composed of guitarist Sascha Collision and singer Zoe Durrant. The song was released in the Netherlands by Armind on 22 January 2007 as the third single from van Buuren's compilation 10 Years.

It the first collaboration of van Buuren with Rank 1's member Benno de Goeij who has become the permanent co-producer of his tracks.

== Background and release ==
"This World Is Watching Me" was released as a collaboration between Armin van Buuren and Dutch trance duo Rank 1, featuring vocals by English act Kush. Apple Music lists a two-track digital single dated 22 January 2007 and issued by Armada Music, containing the original mix and the Cosmic Gate remix. A three-track EP edition, titled This World Is Watching Me (Featuring Kush), was released on 5 March 2007 and included the radio edit, original mix and Cosmic Gate remix. Van Buuren's official website lists the single as an Armind release dated 4 March 2007.

== Music video ==
A music video to accompany the release of "This World Is Watching Me was first released onto YouTube on 2 November 2007. It features a walking girl wearing a heart outfit. It was shot in Iceland. It also contains extracts from Armin Only 2006 concert in Rotterdam Ahoy.

== Legacy ==
In a 2017 feature on vocal trance, Matt "MyStro" Schaitel of EDM Identity included "This World Is Watching Me" as an example of 2000s vocal trance, highlighting the collaboration between van Buuren and Rank 1 and Kush's use of both chopped vocals and lyrical vocal parts. The song was later included on A State of Trance 1000 – Celebration Mix, a 2021 mix compiled from tracks voted for by the A State of Trance community.

== Track listing ==
- Netherlands – Armind – 12" & Digital download (ARMD1035)
1. "This World Is Watching Me" (Original Mix) – 7:58
2. "This World Is Watching Me" (Cosmic Gate Remix) – 8:36
- Netherlands - Armada - CD Single (ARMA081)
1. "This World Is Watching Me" (Radio Edit) - 3:25
2. "This World Is Watching Me" (Cosmic Gate Remix) - 8:36
- United States – Ultra – Digital download (UL1530)
1. "This World Is Watching Me" (Radio Edit) - 3:25
2. "This World Is Watching Me" (Original Mix) – 7:58
3. "This World Is Watching Me" (Cosmic Gate Remix) – 8:37

== Charts ==
Chart (2007)	Peak position
Finland (Suomen virallinen lista)	5
Netherlands (Dutch Top 40)	26
Netherlands (Single Top 100)	19
