= Sunburn (Walk Through the Fire) =

2003 song by Armin van Buuren

Single by Armin van Buuren

from the album 76
- Released: 17 February 2003
- Genre: Uplifting trance
- Length: 3:01 (Vocal Edit); 6:51 (Extended Vocal Mix)
- Label: Armind; United
- Songwriter: Armin van Buuren
- Producer: Armin van Buuren

Armin van Buuren singles chronology
"Yet Another Day" (2002)	"Sunburn (Walk Through the Fire)" (2003)	"Burned with Desire" (2003)

"Sunburn (Walk Through the Fire)" is a song by Dutch DJ and record producer Armin van Buuren. It was originally released as the instrumental track "Sunburn" and was later issued as a vocal single, "Sunburn (Walk Through the Fire)" as 12" vinyl and CD single in the Netherlands on 17 February 2003 by Armind, featuring luncredited vocals from British singer Victoria Horn. The single was released in the Netherlands in 2003 by Armind and United Recordings and was included on van Buuren's debut studio album 76.

== Music video ==
An official music video for "Sunburn (Walk Through the Fire)" was released in 2003. The video features van Buuren performing in Auckland.

== Track listing ==
Netherlands – 12" – Armind (ARM012)

1. "Sunburn" (Original Mix) – 7:34
2. "Sunburn" (Jamie Anderson Remix) – 6:19

Netherlands – CD single – Armind (ARM017-3)

1. "Sunburn (Walk Through the Fire)" (Vocal Edit) – 3:32
2. "Sunburn (Walk Through the Fire)" (Instrumental Edit) – 3:27

Netherlands – CD maxi-single – Armind (ARM017-9)

1. "Sunburn (Walk Through the Fire)" (Vocal Edit) – 3:32
2. "Sunburn (Walk Through the Fire)" (Instrumental Edit) – 3:27
3. "Sunburn (Walk Through the Fire)" (Extended Vocal Mix) – 6:51
4. "Sunburn (Walk Through the Fire)" (Instrumental Mix) – 7:33

Netherlands – Digital download – Armada Digital (ARDI205)

1. "Sunburn (Walk Through the Fire)" (Vocal Edit) – 3:32
2. "Sunburn (Walk Through the Fire)" (Extended Vocal Mix) – 6:53
3. "Sunburn (Walk Through the Fire)" (Jamie Anderson Remix) – 7:18
4. "Sunburn (Walk Through the Fire)" (Extended Instrumental Mix) – 10:05

== Charts ==
Chart (2003)	Peak position
Netherlands (Dutch Top 40)	7
Netherlands (Single Top 100)	43

== Release history ==
Year	Title	Region	Format	Label	Ref.
2003	"Sunburn"	Netherlands	12-inch vinyl	Armind	
2003	"Sunburn (Walk Through the Fire)"	Netherlands	CD, CD maxi-single	Armind; United Recordings	
2003	"Sunburn (Walk Through the Fire)"	Worldwide	Digital download	Armada Music	
