= Andi Durrant =

British radio presenter and music producer

- Born: 23 February 1981 (age 45); Leeds, West Yorkshire, England
- Occupations: Radio presenter, company co-founder, disc jockey, record producer

Andi Durrant (born 23 February 1981) is an English radio presenter, company co-founder, disc jockey and record producer from Leeds, West Yorkshire, England.

Durrant currently hosts The Dance Music Archive radio show on Kisstory in the UK

== Radio presenter ==
He is most notable for his support of electronic and dance music on British and international radio - having presented long-standing programs on Kiss, Capital, Nova FM Australia and previously Galaxy. Durrant has received three Sony Radio Academy Awards and been nominated for three Arqiva Radio Awards for "Best Specialist Program". Durrant joined Galaxy FM at the age of 16 in 1998 as one of the UK's youngest radio presenters, and took over Friday and Saturday nights on the new Capital FM national network in January 2011.

He left Capital in September 2013 to launch his production company, This Is Distorted, and joined the new Kiss FM network, KissFresh, in March 2014. His Electrik Playground radio show was broadcast every Sunday at 9pm on Kiss Fresh and the Nova network in Australia, and was syndicated to stations in New York, Florida, Boston, Australia, Colombia, Mexico, Egypt, Canada, Ireland, and Cyprus.

He has conducted interviews and made one-off specials with the Prodigy, Pet Shop Boys, Example, Faithless, Calvin Harris, Groove Armada, and Daft Punk.

In 2021, Durrant launched the Dance Music Archive - an online archive website and social media community.

The Dance Music Archive radio show was launched in September 2021 and currently airs at 7pm on Sunday on Kisstory

== Other presentation roles ==
Durrant was the presenter of Tidy TV, the regular TV programme from British dance music brand Tidy. He also presents (uncredited) "Transmission Radio" - the networked radio show of Transmission, and BClub Radio in Barcelona.

== Executive producer ==
Andi Durrant has acted as executive producer and co-writer of a number of other radio shows:

- Sun:Sets - with Chicane (musician)
- Music For a Harder Generation with The Tidy Boys
- Paul van Dyk - VONYC Sessions
- Don Diablo - Hexagon Radio
- deadmau5 - Mau5trap Radio
- The Hustle - with Roger Sanchez
- A Little Respect with Andy Bell (singer)
- Dance Britannia with Sister Bliss

== Awards ==
| Year | Awarding Body | Category | Programme | Result |
|---|---|---|---|---|
| 2007 | Sony Radio Academy Awards | Music Broadcaster Of the Year | Andi Durrant for Galaxy FM | Silver |
| 2008 | Sony Radio Academy Awards | Music Broadcaster Of the Year | Andi Durrant for Galaxy FM | Gold |
| 2009 | Sony Radio Academy Awards | Best Specialist Music Programme | The Warmup for Galaxy FM | Silver |
| 2011 | Arqiva Radio Awards | Best Specialist Music Programme | Andi Durrant on Capital FM | Bronze |
| 2013 | Arqiva Radio Awards | Best Specialist Music Programme | The Electrik Playground on Kiss Fresh | Bronze |
| 2015 | Arqiva Radio Awards | Best Specialist Music Programme | The Electrik Playground on Kiss Fresh | Silver |
| 2024 | New York Festival | Entertainment - Music Programme | The Dance Music Archive | Bronze |
| 2025 | Radio Academy ARIAS | Best Music Programme | The Dance Music Archive | Nominee |

== This Is Distorted ==
Durrant co-founded UK production company This Is Distorted in 2013 with long-term business partner Nick Riley. The company produces and syndicates international radio shows and podcasts for electronic artists and brands such as deadmau5, Don Diablo, Defected Records, Paul Van Dyk, Chicane, Claptone, MK, Nora En Pure, EDX, Alok, Sister Bliss, SiriusXM and British Airways, alongside podcasts from Owen Jones, Roger Sanchez, Cafe Direct, Clint Boon and the NHS.

== DJ and record producer ==
Durrant has produced 130 tracks and remixes for a wide range of recording artists including Armin Van Buuren, Paul Van Dyk, Laidback Luke, Steve Aoki, Jacques Lu Cont, Chaka Khan, Plan B and Will I Am.

As part of Riley & Durrant, Durrant held residencies at Privilege and Amnesia Ibiza, Ministry of Sound in London and at Gatecrasher in Sheffield, where they met behind the DJ booth in 2002. Through their Electrik Playground and Nu Breed club nights, record labels and radio programs, Riley & Durrant have been influential in playing and promoting underground electronic music on UK radio.

In 2012, Durrant became the resident DJ and host for Ibiza Live at Eden Ibiza and Mallorca Live at BCM in Magaluf, playing weekly alongside Example, DJ Fresh, Dizzee Rascal, Tinie Tempah, Jessie J and Professor Green.

Durrant has also worked with Steve More remixing more pop and commercial artists such as Plan B, Flo Rida, The Saturdays, Jennifer Lopez, Vato Gonzalez, Lethal Bizzle, JLS, Lawson, Will I Am, Far East Movement and Paul Van Dyk and has produced album tracks for Avril Lavigne.

== Discography ==
Official remixes

| Artist | Title | Remix | Release date |
|---|---|---|---|
| Hold On Lola | Oversight | Andi Durrant Remix | January 2016 |
| Chicane | Still With Me | Andi Durrant Remix | September 2014 |
| Levels | Feeling Your Love | Spin City Remix | August 2014 |
| The Saturdays | 808 | Spin City Remix | July 2014 |
| A3 | Snow Melts In To Rain | Andi Durrant & Steve More Remix | July 2014 |
| The Vamps | Somebody To You | Andi Durrant & Steve More Remix | June 2014 |
| A3 | Redemption | Durrant & More Remix | May 2014 |
| Appassionata | Dirty Edges | Andi Durrant 174 Remix | May 2014 |
| Jennifer Lopez | I Luh Ya Papi | Andi Durrant & Steve More Remix | May 2014 |
| Scarlett Fever | 6 Foot Woman | Andi Durrant Remix | April 2014 |
| Alla Ray | The Race | Andi Durrant & Steve More Remix | March 2014 |
| Gia | Bombs Away | Andi Durrant & Steve More Remix | February 2014 |
| Audio Playground | Hands Up In The Air | Durrant & More Remix | February 2014 |
| Patrik Remann | Ready For The Night | Andi Durrant Remix | January 2014 |
| Silverland | Golden | Andi Durrant & Steve More Remix | January 2014 |
| Union J | Loving You Is Easy | Andi Durrant & Steve More Remix | November 2013 |
| Kamaliya | Love Me Like | Andi Durrant Remix | September 2013 |
| Ayo | Alive | Andi Durrant & Steve More Remix | September 2013 |
| Alex Metric & Jacques Lu Cont | Safe With You | Andi Durrant & Steve More Remix | August 2013 |
| Chicane | One More Time | Andi Durrant & Steve More Remix | August 2013 |
| Jolyon Petch & Jotheo | 2 Soldiers | Andi Durrant & Steve More Remix | August 2013 |
| Kristine W | So Close | Andi Durrant & Steve More Remix | August 2013 |
| K Cat | Take You You Heaven | Andi Durrant & Steve More Remix | August 2013 |
| Curtis Moore | Lipstick | Andi Durrant Remix | July 2013 |
| Avril Lavigne | Here's to Never Growing Up | Andi Durrant & Steve More Remix | July 2013 |
| Havana ft Tyga | Like Magic | Andi Durrant & Steve More Remix | July 2013 |
| Temara Melek | Karma's Not Pretty | Andi Durrant & Steve More Remix | July 2013 |
| Paul Rudd ft Sam Calver | Wake The World | Andi Durrant & Steve More Remix | July 2013 |
| Thunderbird Gerard | T.R.O.U.B.L.E | Andi Durrant 174 Remix | June 2013 |
| James Woolfe | No Danger | Andi Durrant Remix | June 2013 |
| Chaka Khan | It's Not Over | Andi Durrant & Steve More Remix | June 2013 |
| Kady Z | Crush Gone Wrong | Andi Durrant & Steve More Remix | May 2013 |
| Nabiha | Never Played The Bass | Andi Durrant & Steve More Remix | May 2013 |
| Ayala | On My Way | Andi Durrant & Steve More Remix | May 2013 |
| Jewel | Two Hearts | Andi Durrant & Steve More Remix | April 2013 |
| Silverland ft Baley | Hang Up | Andi Durrant & Steve More Remix | April 2013 |
| Amelia Lily | Party's Over | Andi Durrant & Steve More Remix | April 2013 |
| Kady Z | Crashing Down | Andi Durrant & Steve More Remix | April 2013 |
| Jenn D | You Keep Giving Me Love | Andi Durrant & Steve More Remix | March 2013 |
| DJ Paul Rudd ft Amanda Wilson | Trust in Me | Andi Durrant & Steve More Remix | March 2013 |
| Shockolady | Hello | Andi Durrant & Steve More Remix | Feb 2013 |
| Platinum | Love You Tomorrow | Andi Durrant & Steve More Remix | Feb 2013 |
| Blaise | Thunderstorm | Andi Durrant & Steve More Remix | Feb 2013 |
| Beth Sherburn | Ordinary World | Andi Durrant & Steve More Remix | Jan 2013 |
| Vato Gonzales ft Lethal Bizzle & Donaeo | Not A Saint | Andi Durrant Remix | Jan 2013 |
| Unicorn Kid | Feels So Real | Andi Durrant & Steve More Remix | Jan 2013 |
| The Chozen | Sell My Soul | Andi Durrant & Steve More Remix | Dec 2012 |
| Priyanka ft Will I Am | In My City | Andi Durrant & Steve More Remix | Dec 2012 |
| JLS | Hottest Girl in the World | Andi Durrant & Steve More Remix | Nov 2012 |
| Lawson | Standing in the Dark | Andi Durrant & Steve More Remix | Nov 2012 |
| Far East Movement ft Sidney Samson | Change Your Life | Andi Durrant & Steve More Remix | Sept 2012 |
| Kamalyia | Butterflies | Andi Durrant & Steve More Remix | Sept 2012 |
| Karen Ruimy | Come With Me | Riley & Durrant Remix | August 2012 |
| Blaise | Attitude | Andi Durrant & Steve More Remix | August 2012 |
| Ex Senators | Angel | Andi Durrant & Steve More Remix | July 2012 |
| Trey Songz | Simply Amazing | Andi Durrant & Steve More Remix | July 2012 |
| Lonsdale Boys Club | Ready to Go | Andi Durrant & Steve More Remix | July 2012 |
| Flo Rida | Whistle | Andi Durrant & Steve More Remix | June 2012 |
| Sulpher vs Riley & Durrant | Tomorrow | Original | June 2012 |
| Plan B | Ill Manors | Andi Durrant Remix | April 2012 |
| Paul Van Dyk | Eternity | Riley & Durrant Remix | March 2012 |
| Chicane | Thousand Mile Stare | Riley & Durrant Remix | Nov 11 |
| Kerli | Army of Love | Riley & Durrant Remix / Dub | June 2011 |
| Laidback Luke, Steve Aoki & Lil John | Turbulence | Riley & Durrant Remix | April 2011 |
| Sarah Atereth | Without You | Riley & Durrant Remix | March 2011 |
| Backyard Orchestra | Smiling Faces | Original and Riley & Durrant Mixes | July 2011 |
| K Klass | Capture Me | Riley & Durrant Mix | Jan 11 |
| Felix Leiter vs Dario G | Sunchyme 2010 | Riley & Durrant Remix | Nov 10 |
| Moog Daddies | Gucha | Riley & Durrant Remix | July 2010 |
| Hannah | I Believe | Riley & Durrant Remix | June 2010 |
| Scott Mac | Damager | Riley & Durrant Remix | April 2010 |
| Chicane | Are You Listening | Riley & Durrant Remix | April 2010 |
| 68 Beats | Are You Listening | Riley & Durrant Mix | Jan 10 |
| Snow Patrol | Just Say Yes | Riley & Durrant Mix | October 2009 |
| Dimitri Vegas & Like Mike | Under The Water | Riley & Durrant Mix | October 2009 |
| Blue Pearl | Naked in the Rain | Riley & Durrant Mix | Sept 2009 |
| Origin Unknown | Valley of the Shadows | Riley & Durrant Mix | Feb 2009 |
| Just Jack | Embers | Riley & Durrant Mix | Feb 2009 |
| Sylvia Tosun ft Loverush UK | 5 Reasons | Riley & Durrant Mix | Jan 2009 |
| DJ Antoine | This Time | Riley & Durrant Mix | Jan 2009 |
| Juan Kidd | Putayn | Riley & Durrant Mix | Aug 2009 |
| Cube Guys | Baba O'Riley | Riley & Durrant Mix | Jun 2008 |
| Richard Coleman | Haymaker | Riley & Durrant Mix | May 2008 |
| CNTRL ALT DLETE | Hit My Stix | Riley & Durrant Mix | May 2008 |
| Brother Brown | Under the Water | Riley & Durrant Mix | April 2008 |
| Nicky C | Seasons | Riley & Durrant Mix | April 2008 |
| Mark Brown & Sarah Cracknell | The Journey Continues | Riley & Durrant Mix | Feb 2008 |
| Utah Saints | What Can You Do For Me | Riley & Durrant Mix | Feb 2008 |
| Congress | 40 Miles | Riley & Durrant Mix | Sep 2007 |
| Jes | Heaven | Riley & Durrant Mix | May 2007 |
| Arno Cost & Arias | Magenta | Riley & Durrant Mix | April 2007 |
| Alex Gold & Phil Oakey | LA Today | Riley & Durrant Mix | Jan 2007 |
| Tall Paul & Dave Aude | Common Ground | Riley & Durrant Mix | May 2006 |
| Scott Mac It Must Have Been A Dream | ATCR | Riley & Durrant Mix | Oct 2005 |
| Cosmic Gate | I Feel Wonderful | Riley & Durrant Mix | Aug 2005 |
| Airbiscuit Lately | Zenith Cafe | Riley & Durrant Mix | May 2005 |
| Way Out West | Don't Forget Me | Riley & Durrant Mix | March 2005 |
| Hiratzka and Kazell Venice Dawn | SR2 | Riley & Durrant Mix | Feb 2005 |
| Armin Van Buuren | Burned With Desire | Riley & Durrant Mix | Jan 2005 |
| Lustral | Every Time | Riley & Durrant Mix | June 2004 |
| Space Brothers | Wings Across The Universe | Riley & Durrant Mix | April 2004 |
| Space Brothers | One More Chance | Riley & Durrant Mix | Jan 2004 |
| Sinéad O'Connor | Troy | Andi Durrant Remix | May 2003 |

Artist albums

| Artist | Title | Label | Year |
|---|---|---|---|
| Riley & Durrant | Research & Development | Newstate Records | 2007 |

Singles

| Artist | Title | Label | Release date |
|---|---|---|---|
| Riley & Durrant | Femme Retrospectif | The Gallery | August 2012 |
| Sulpher vs Riley & Durrant | Tomorrow | Whte Label | June 2012 |
| Hauswerks vs Riley & Durrant | Bellydancer | 303 Lovers | June 2010 |
| Riley & Durrant ft This Morning Call | All I Leave Behind | Electrik Playground | May 2010 |
| Council Estate Supermodels ft Riley & Durrant | Keep Smiling | Electrik Playground | April 2010 |
| Riley & Durrant vs Juan Kidd | Da Bass | CR2 | Feb 2010 |
| Riley & Durrant | Jagerbomb | Electrik Playground | Nov 2009 |
| Riley & Durrant | Remote Control | Nu Breed Music | Jun 2008 |
| Electrik Playground | Electrik Playground | Nu Breed Music | Jun 2008 |
| Riley & Durrant | Aurora | Newstate Music | Jan 2008 |
| Riley & Durrant with Hauswerks | Experiment No. 2 | Newstate Music | Jan 2008 |
| Riley & Durrant ft Gina Dootson | Hollow | Newstate Music | June 2007 |
| Riley & Durrant | Neon Eyes | United | March 2006 |
| Riley & Durrant | Home | Blackhole | Jan 2006 |
| Riley & Durrant | The Code | Blackhole | Jan 2006 |
| Riley & Durrant | Suddenly | Monster | Nov 2005 |
| Riley & Durrant | Exile | Distorted | April 2004 |
| Riley & Durrant | Candesco | Recover | May 2003 |
| Andi Durrant | The Rabbit Hole | Devolution | July 2002 |

Producer packs

- Riley & Durrant Progressive House Producer (2009 Loopmasters)
- Riley & Durrant Progressive House Producer 2 (2010 Loopmasters)

Compilation albums

- Electrik Playground Ibiza: Mixed by Riley & Durrant (2008 Newstate Music)
- Quest for Trance 2: Mixed by Riley & Durrant (2005 United Records)
- Gatecrasher Russia: Mixed by Riley & Durrant (2004 Gatecrasher)
