= David Gravell =

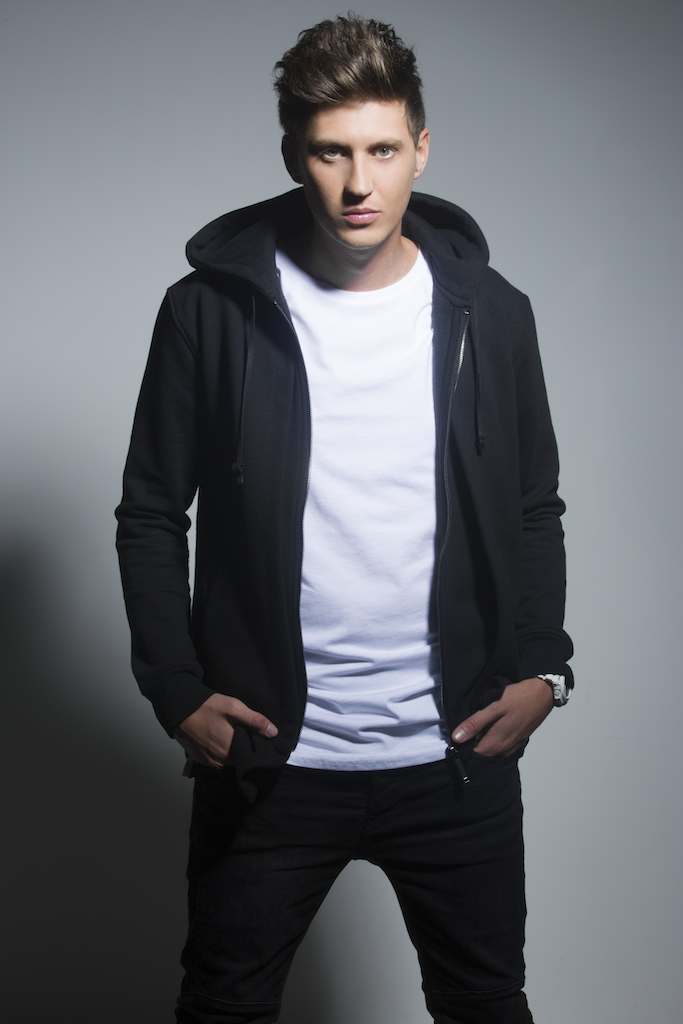
- David Gravell in 2015

Background information
- Born: Danny de Graaf; 30 March 1988 (age 38); Amsterdam, Netherlands
- Origin: Netherlands
- Genres: Trance; electro house; progressive house
- Occupations: DJ; producer; remixer
- Instruments: Keyboards; mixer
- Years active: 2005–present
- Labels: Armada; Revealed; A State of Trance; Mainstage Music; inHarmony Music; High Contrast Recordings
- Website: djdavidgravell.com

Danny de Graaf (Dutch pronunciation: [ˈdɑni də ˈɣraːf]; born 30 March 1988), who performs under the stage name David Gravell (/ɡrəˈvɛl/ grə-VEL), is a Dutch DJ and trance record producer. He was voted for several IDMAs in 2015.

David Gravell first gained recognition in 2013 for his original "Bulldozer", released on W&W's label Mainstage Music. He is signed exclusively to Armada.

== Musical career ==
David Gravell's first ever release was his track "Downtown" on Visionair Records in 2010. After signing "Flight 182" on Marcel Woods' label Musical Madness he then released "Fire Away" which was included on W&W's Mainstage Vol. 1 compilation. His next release, "Bulldozer", was heavily supported by his peers in the industry, including Armin van Buuren on his BBC Radio 1 Essential Mix.

Between 2013 and 2015, he had well-received releases such as "Bulldozer", "Megatron', "Timebomb", "The Last Of Us" and "Supernova". These songs were supported by successful artists including Armin van Buuren, Hardwell, W&W, and Andrew Rayel. Next to that, he produced official remixes for the likes of Armin van Buuren, Dash Berlin, Ørjan Nilsen, and Mark Sixma. Within six months, his remix for Dash Berlin's 'Man On The Run' reached over 1 million plays on Spotify.

Meanwhile, Gravell has played at four A State of Trance festivals in Sydney, Ibiza and Utrecht. He has also performed at other festivals such as Ultra Music Festival, Creamfields, Amsterdam Dance Event, and Boulevard Outdoor.

In 2015, Gravell was nominated for the International Dance Music Awards in the Best Break-Through DJ and Best Trance DJ categories.

In 2017, Gravell released his first mix compilation, Discover, which featured more than 40 tracks, including new original productions and exclusive music. He said that he had spent several months working on the compilation and used it to showcase the music he was developing and playing in his live sets. In an interview with Dance Music NW, Gravell described 2017 as a particularly productive year, explaining that he and his label aimed to release new music regularly, with the compilation bringing together his recent productions.

In 2018, Gravell collaborated with Andrew Rayel on “Trance ReBorn”, which served as the anthem for the 100th episode of Rayel's Find Your Harmony radio show. The two producers developed the track while staying together in Las Vegas, completing the initial production within two to three days. They tested the unfinished track during subsequent performances before premiering it at Tomorrowland.

Another release from 2018 was the track called “The Future” on Armada Music. He explained that the track originated from two musical ideas he had been developing the previous year. After combining them, he continued revising the production while playing it at shows around the world. He later added a vocal element to complete the track, which incorporated rolling basslines and tech-trance influences. Gravell said the concept reflected an idea he had wanted to realise several years earlier.

== Discography ==
=== Singles and EPs ===
2012

- "Flight 182" [Musical Madness]
- "Fire Away" [Mainstage Music]

2013

- "Bulldozer" [Mainstage Music]
- "Megatron" [6K Music]

2014

- "Nighthawk" [Armada Trice]
- "Melbourne" [Armada Captivating]
- "Timebomb" [A State of Trance]
- "The Last of Us" [Armada Captivating]
- "Supernova" [Mainstage Music]
- "Kaiju" [Armada Captivating]

2015

- "It's in Your Heart" (feat. Christon) [Armada Captivating]
- "Valor" (with Husman) [Armada Captivating]
- "I Follow" [A State Of Trance]

2016

- "Far From Home" (feat. Ruby Prophet) [Armada Captivating]
- "Stay Awake" [A State of Trance]
- "The Riddle" [Armada Captivating]
- "Battlefront" [A State of Trance]
- "Make Some Noise" [A State of Trance]
- '"The Road" [A State of Trance]
- "Neverland" [A State of Trance]

2017

- "Energy" [A State of Trance/Armada]
- "Explore" [A State of Trance/Armada]
- "Children" [A State of Trance/Armada] (Cover by Robert Miles)
- "Traveller" [A State of Trance/Armada]
- "On the Move" [inHarmony Music/Armada]
- "Addicted To" [Mainstage Music]

2018

- "Trance ReBorn" (with Andrew Rayel) [inHarmony Music]
- "The Future" [A State of Trance/Armada]

2019

- "Never Sleep" (with Blastoyz) [Alteza Records]
- "Alpha Centauri" (with KhoMha) [Armind]

2020

- "Bliss" (with Corti Organ) [inHarmony Music]

2023

- "The Light" [Mindcharge Records]

2024

- "Cosmic Mysteries" [Mindcharge Records]

2025

- "Feel So Free" [High Contrast Recordings]
- "Follow Me" [High Contrast Recordings]
- "Infinite EP" [High Contrast Recordings]
  - "Infinite"
  - "Wonderland"

2026

- "Revision" [High Contrast Recordings]

=== Remixes ===
2013

- Audien feat Michael S. - "Leaving You" (David Gravell Remix) [Zouk Recordings]

2014

- Mark Sixma & Jerome Isma-ae - "Refused" (David Gravell Remix) [Jee Productions]
- Veracocha - "Carte Blanche" (David Gravell Remix) [Deal Records]

2015

- Armin van Buuren - "Together (In a State of Trance)" (David Gravell Remix) [A State of Trance]
- Alexander Popov - "Lost Language'" (David Gravell Remix) [Armind]
- Dash Berlin, Cerf, Mitiska & Jaren - "Man on the Run" (David Gravell Remix) [Armada Captivating]
- Tigerlily - "Feel the Love" (David Gravell Remix) [Universal Music]
- Ørjan Nilsen - "Amsterdam" (David Gravell Remix) [In My Opinion]

2016

- Super8 & Tab - "Komorebi" (David Gravell Remix) [Armind]
- ilan Bluestone feat. Giuseppe De Luca - "Bigger Than Love" (David Gravell Remix) [Anjunabeats]
- Eurythmics - "Sweet Dreams (Are Made of This)" (David Gravell Remix) [Free Download]

2017

- Armin van Buuren - "Communication" (David Gravell Remix) [Armind]
- Yeah Yeah Yeahs - "Heads Will Roll" (David Gravell Remix)

2018

- Energy 52 - Café del Mar (David Gravell Remix)

2020

- Armin van Buuren feat. Jan Vayne – "Serenity" (David Gravell Remix) [Armada Music]

=== Reworks ===
2015

- Sebastian Ingrosso & Tommy Trash ft. John Martin - "Reload" (David Gravell Rework)

2016

- Calvin Harris & Disciples - "How Deep Is Your Love" (David Gravell Rework)
