= Touch Me (Rising Star song) =

Single by Armin van Buuren Presents Rising Star

from the album 10 Years
- Released: 1999 (UK); 7 March 2001 (Netherlands)
- Recorded: 1999
- Genre: Uplifting trance
- Length: 3:31 (Original IC Edit); 7:33 (Original IC Mix)
- Label: Armind; United; Data; Ministry of Sound
- Songwriter(s): Armin van Buuren
- Producer(s): Rising Star

Rising Star singles chronology
"Touch Me" (1999)	"Clear Blue Moon" / "Star Theme" (2002)

"Touch Me" is a song by Dutch disc jockey and producer Armin van Buuren under his alias Rising Star. It is his first track under the Rising Star alias. The song was released in on 1999 in the Netherlands on Armind as 12" vinyl. It samples Messiah's "Thunderdome" vocals. It is included in van Buuren's compilation album 10 Years.

== Track listing ==
UK - 12" - Data (DATA4)

1. "Touch Me" (Original Mix) - 9:13
2. "Touch Me" (Armix Remix) - 10:24

Netherlands - 12" Part 1 - Armind (ARM005)

1. "Touch Me" (Darude Remix) - 8:12
2. "Touch Me" (Original Vocal Mix) - 9:09

Netherlands - 12" Part 2 - Armind (ARM006)

1. "Touch Me" (Armin van Buuren Remix) - 9:36
2. "Touch Me" (Vincent de Moor Remix) - 7:40

US - 12" - Ministry of Sound (MOSUS 2001-1)

1. "Touch Me" (Armin van Buuren Vocal Mix) - 9:09
2. "Touch Me" (Darude Sandstorm Remix) - 8:12

Netherlands - 2006 digital download re-issue - Armada Digital (ARDI209)

1. "Touch Me" (Original Vocal Mix) - 9:10
2. "Touch Me" (Armin van Buuren Remix) - 10:07
3. "Touch Me" (Darude Remix) - 8:45
4. "Touch Me" (Vincent de Moor Remix) - 7:41

== Charts ==
Chart (1999)	Peak position
UK Singles (OCC)	98
