= Yet Another Day =

2002 song by Armin van Buuren

Single by Armin van Buuren featuring Ray Wilson

from the album 76
- Released: 23 October 2002
- Genre: Uplifting trance; acoustic rock
- Length: 3:30 (Radio Edit); 10:18 (Original Mix)
- Label: Armind; United; Nebula; Ultra
- Songwriters: Armin van Buuren; Ray Wilson
- Producer: Armin van Buuren

Armin van Buuren singles chronology
"Communication" (1999)	"Yet Another Day" (2002)	"Sunburn (Walk Through the Fire)" (2002)

Ray Wilson singles chronology
"Yet Another Day" (2002)	"Change" (2003)

"Yet Another Day" is a song by Dutch DJ and record producer Armin van Buuren, featuring Scottish singer and guitarist Ray Wilson. It is based on Wilson's song "Another Day", which appeared on his debut solo studio album Change. The song was released in the Netherlands on 23 October 2002 by Armind and was later included on van Buuren's debut studio album 76.

The single reached number 27 on the Dutch Top 40, number 34 on the Dutch Single Top 100, number 70 on the UK Singles Chart, number 12 on the UK Dance Singles Chart and number 7 on the UK Independent Singles Chart.

Van Buuren also created a mash-up of "Yet Another Day" with Tiësto's "Suburban Train", known as "Yet Another Suburban Train" or "Another Suburban Train".

== Background ==
"Yet Another Day" was one of van Buuren's early vocal trance singles and was released through several labels, including Armind in the Netherlands, Nebula in the United Kingdom and Ultra Records in the United States. A digital edition of the single is listed by Apple Music as a 16-track release issued by Armada Music.

The lyrics of the song are dedicated to one of Wilson's friends who committed suicide. He declared: "I wrote this for a school friend who killed himself. I tried to imagine what he must have been thinking to do such a thing. Was he in need of a better life? And dying to see another day? I tried to get inside a suicidal mind and write from that perspective, if that is possible."

== Music video ==
A music video to accompany the release of "Yet Another Day" was released in 2002. It features Ray Wilson. He commits suicide by exhibiting himself under the sunlight to burn his clothers. Then, he walks in the street surrounded by flames. He ends up dying next to a car driven by Armin van Buuren.

== Track listing ==
Netherlands – 12" – Armind (ARM014)

1. "Yet Another Day" (Original Mix) – 10:18
2. "Yet Another Day" (Sunday 5 pm Mix) – 8:40

Netherlands – CD single – Armind (ARM014-3)

1. "Yet Another Day" (Radio Edit) – 3:27
2. "Yet Another Day" (Riva Edit) – 3:44

Netherlands – CD single – Armind (ARM014-9)

1. "Yet Another Day" (Vocal Edit) – 3:32
2. "Yet Another Day" (Riva Edit) – 3:44
3. "Yet Another Day" (Original Mix) – 10:18
4. "Yet Another Day" (Video Clip) – 3:51<

Netherlands – Remixes Part 1 - 12" – Armind (ARMD015)

1. "Yet Another Day" (Riva Remix) – 8:51
2. "Yet Another Day" (Rising Star Remix) – 8:37

Netherlands – Remixes Part 2 – 12" – Armind (ARMD016)

1. "Yet Another Day" (Yet Another Dub) – 8:17
2. "Yet Another Day" (Hiver & Hammer's Ground Control Remix) – 9:17

Germany – 12" – Zeitgeist

1. "Yet Another Day" (Original Mix) – 10:21
2. "Yet Another Day" (Sunday 5 pm Mix) – 8:40
3. "Yet Another Day" (Riva Remix) – 8:42

Germany – Remixes – 12" – Zeitgeist

1. "Yet Another Day" (Hiver & Hammer's Ground Control Remix) – 9:19
2. "Yet Another Day" (Riva Remix) – 8:45
3. "Yet Another Day" (Riva Dub) – 8:26

UK – 12" – Nebula (NEBT042)

1. "Yet Another Day" (Original Mix) – 10:18
2. "Yet Another Day" (Riva Remix) – 8:42

UK – CD single – Nebula (NEBCD042)

1. "Yet Another Day" (Radio Edit) – 3:42
2. "Yet Another Day" (Riva Remix) – 5:29
3. "Yet Another Day" (Hiver & Hammer's Ground Control Remix) – 5:48
4. "Yet Another Day" (DJ Shah Remix) – 5:08

UK – Remixes – 12" – Nebula (NEBTX042)

1. "Yet Another Day" (Hiver & Hammer's Ground Control Remix) – 9:16
2. "Yet Another Day" (DJ Shah Remix) – 8:23

UK – Attention Deficit Mixes – 12" – Nebula (NEBTXX042)

1. "Yet Another Day" (Attention Deficit Adderrol Session) – 8:55
2. "Yet Another Day" (Attention Deficit Multi Task Remix) – 9:09

US – 12" – Ultra (UL1157-6)

1. "Yet Another Day" (Original Mix) – 10:18
2. "Yet Another Day" (Riva Remix) – 8:42

US – Digital download – Ultra (UL1157)

1. "Yet Another Day" (Radio Edit) – 3:31
2. "Yet Another Day" (Riva Radio Edit) – 3:43
3. "Yet Another Day" (Original Mix) – 10:18
4. "Yet Another Day" (Riva Remix) – 8:48
5. "Yet Another Day" (Sunday 5 pm Remix) – 8:44
6. "Yet Another Day" (Rising Star Remix) – 8:42
7. "Yet Another Day" (Attention Deficit Adderrol Session) – 9:06
8. "Yet Another Day" (Attention Deficit Multi Task Remix) – 9:20
9. "Yet Another Day" (Hiver & Hammer Ground Control Dub) – 9:49
10. "Yet Another Day" (DJ Shah Remix) – 8:33
11. "Yet Another Day" (Yet Another Dub) – 8:20
12. "Yet Another Day" (Riva Dub) – 8:27
13. "Yet Another Day" (Armin's Downtempo Radio Edit) – 4:11
14. "Yet Another Day" (Armin's Downtempo Extended Mix) – 8:53
15. "Yet Another Day" (Armin's Downtempo Instrumental Radio Edit) – 4:12
16. "Yet Another Day" (Armin's Downtempo Extended Instrumental Mix) – 8:54

== Charts ==
Chart (2003)	Peak position
Belgium (Ultratip Bubbling Under Flanders)	14
Netherlands (Dutch Top 40)	27
Netherlands (Single Top 100)	34
UK Singles (OCC)	70
UK Physical Singles (OCC)	70
UK Dance (OCC)	12

== Release history ==
Year	Title	Region	Format	Label	Ref.
2002	"Yet Another Day"	Netherlands	12-inch vinyl, CD	Armind	
2003	"Yet Another Day"	United Kingdom	CD, 12-inch vinyl	Nebula	
2003	"Yet Another Day"	United States	12-inch vinyl, digital download	Ultra Records	
2007	"Yet Another Day" / "Burned with Desire"	United Kingdom	12-inch vinyl	Nebula	
