= Blue Fear =

1997 composition by Armin van Buuren

Single by Armin

from the album 76
- Released: 13 October 1997; 16 August 2004 (re-issue)
- Studio: Armin's parents home, Leiden
- Genre: Eurotrance
- Length: 3:42 (Radio Edit); 8:06 (Extended Mix); 2:39 (2003 Edit); 9:30 (2003 Mix)
- Label: Cyber; Xtravaganza; Nebula
- Songwriter: Armin van Buuren
- Producer: Armin

Armin singles chronology
"Check Out Your Mind" (1996)	"Blue Fear" (1997)	"Communication" (1999)

"Blue Fear 2004"
- 2004 re-issue

Armin van Buuren singles chronology
"Burned With Desire" (2003)	"Blue Fear 2004" (2004)	"Intruder" / "Pound" (2004)

"Blue Fear" is an instrumental composition by Dutch DJ and producer Armin. It was initially released on 13 October 1997 as 12" vinyl in the Netherlands by Cyber Records. It is the first track from Armin van Buuren which reached a significant success. The single was rereleased on 16 August 2004 by Nebula as the fifth and final single from Armin's first studio album, 76.

== Background and release ==
At the time of the original release of "Blue Fear", van Buuren was still living in Leiden and was studying law at Leiden University. Dancing Astronaut described the track as a Eurotrance production and noted that it was made with an Akai S-2800 sampler, with delay as the only effect used.

"Blue Fear" was first issued in the Netherlands on Cyber Records and was later released in the United Kingdom through Xtravaganza Recordings. The track gave van Buuren one of his earliest international chart appearances when it reached number 45 on the UK Singles Chart in February 1998.

The single was reissued in 2004 by Nebula as "Blue Fear 2004", following the release of van Buuren's debut studio album 76. The reissue charted at number 52 on the UK Singles Chart, number 3 on the UK Dance Singles Chart and number 8 on the UK Independent Singles Chart.

In 2020, Eelke Kleijn released two remixes of the track, titled the Day Mix and Night Mix, through Armind.

== Music video ==
A music video was realised by Ciro Ayala with the actress Calina Chan for the track 12 years after its official release. It was published on 23 November 2009 by Armada Music's Youtube channel.

== Track listing ==
Netherlands - 12" - Cyber (CYBER015)

1. "Blue Fear" – 7:58
2. "X Marks the Spot" – 7:37
3. "Archeae From Space" - 8:21

UK - CD - Xtravaganza (0091305EXT)

1. "Blue Fear" (Radio Edit) – 3:42
2. "Blue Fear" (Extended Version) – 8:06
3. "X Marks the Spot" – 7:37
4. "Archeae From Space" – 8:27

UK - 12" - Xtravaganza (0091300EXT)

1. "Blue Fear" (Extended Version) – 7:58
2. "X Marks the Spot" – 7:37
3. "Archeae From Space" – 8:21

Trouser Enthusiasts Mixes - UK - CD - Xtravaganza (0091485EXT)

1. "Blue Fear" (Trouser Enthusiasts Edit) – 3:59
2. "Blue Fear" (Trouser Enthusiasts E.B.E. Mix) – 9:01
3. "Blue Fear" (Trouser Enthusiasts E.B.E. Instrumental) – 9:02
4. "Blue Fear" (Original Extended Version) – 8:06

Trouser Enthusiasts Mix - UK - 12" - Xtravaganza (0091480EXT)

1. "Blue Fear" (Trouser Enthusiasts E.B.E. Mix) – 8:59
2. "Blue Fear" (Original Extended Version) – 7:57

Germany - 12" - Bionic Beat (BIO007)

1. "Blue Fear" – 7:58
2. "Blue Fear" (Chuck Mellow Remix) – 7:05
3. "X Marks the Spot" – 7:37

"Blue Fear 2004" - UK - CD & Digital download - Nebula (NEBCD061)

1. "Blue Fear" (Original 2003 Edit) – 2:39
2. "Blue Fear" (Original 2003 Mix) – 9:30
3. "Blue Fear" (Solid Globe 2004 Remix) – 7:33
4. "Blue Fear" (Agnelli & Nelson 2004 Remix) – 9:52
5. "Blue Fear" (Scott Mac New Fear 2004 Remix) – 8:56

"Blue Fear 2004" - UK - 12" - Nebula (NEBT061)

1. "Blue Fear" (Original 2003 Mix) – 9:30
2. "Blue Fear" (Solid Globe 2004 Remix) – 7:33

"Blue Fear 2004" (Remixes) - UK - 12" - Nebula (NEBTX061)

1. "Blue Fear" (Agnelli & Nelson 2004 Remix) – 9:52
2. "Blue Fear" (Scott Mac New Fear 2004 Remix) – 8:56

2006 Re-issue - Netherlands - Digital download - Armada digital (ARDI211)

1. "Blue Fear 2003" – 7:33
2. "Blue Fear" (Agnelli & Nelson Remix) – 9:56
3. "Blue Fear" (Solid Globe Remix) – 7:37
4. "Blue Fear" (Scott Mac Remix) – 8:56

Eelke Kleijn Mixes - Netherlands - Digital download - Armind (ARMD020R)

1. "Blue Fear" (Eelke Kleijn Extended Day Mix) – 7:33
2. "Blue Fear" (Eelke Kleijn Extended Night Mix) – 7:57

== Charts ==
=== Blue Fear ===
Chart (1998)	Peak position
UK Singles (OCC)	45

=== Blue Fear 2004 ===
Chart (2004)	Peak position
UK Singles (OCC)	52
UK Physical Singles (OCC)	52
UK Dance (OCC)	3

== Release history ==
Year	Title	Region	Format	Label	Catalogue number	Ref.
1997	"Blue Fear"	Netherlands	12-inch vinyl	Cyber Records	CYBER015	
1997	"Blue Fear"	United Kingdom	CD, 12-inch vinyl	Xtravaganza Recordings	0091305EXT / 0091300EXT	
1997	"Blue Fear" (Trouser Enthusiasts mixes)	United Kingdom	CD, 12-inch vinyl	Xtravaganza Recordings	0091485EXT / 0091480EXT	
2004	"Blue Fear 2004"	United Kingdom	CD, 12-inch vinyl, digital download	Nebula	NEBCD061 / NEBT061 / NEBTX061	
2006	"Blue Fear"	Netherlands	Digital download	Armada Digital	ARDI211	
2020	"Blue Fear" (Eelke Kleijn Day Mix / Eelke Kleijn Night Mix)	Worldwide	Digital download, streaming	Armind	ARMD020R	
