= 76 (album) =

Studio album by Armin van Buuren
- Released: 16 June 2003
- Recorded: 1999–2003
- Genre: Trance
- Length: 76:00
- Label: United
- Producer: Armin van Buuren; Ray Wilson; Ferry Corsten; Justine Suissa

Armin van Buuren chronology
76 (2003)	Universal Religion Chapter 1 (2003)

Singles from 76
- 1. "Communication" Released: 19 July 1999; 2. "Yet Another Day" Released: 23 October 2002; 3. "Sunburn (Walk Through the Fire)" Released: 17 February 2003; 4. "Burned With Desire" Released: 20 May 2003; 5. "Blue Fear 2004" Released: 16 August 2004

Professional ratings
Review scores
Source	Rating
AllMusic	3/5 stars
PopMatters	Unfavourable

76 is the debut studio album by Dutch DJ and record producer Armin van Buuren. It was released on 16 June 2003 by United Recordings.

== Track listing ==
No.	Title	Writer(s)	Length
1.	"Prodemium"	Armin van Buuren	2:05
2.	"Precious"	van Buuren	6:58
3.	"Yet Another Day" (featuring Ray Wilson)	van Buuren; Ray Wilson	5:24
4.	"Burned With Desire" (featuring Justine Suissa)	van Buuren; Justine Suissa	5:53
5.	"Blue Fear 2003"	van Buuren	7:33
6.	"From the Heart" (featuring System F)	van Buuren; Ferry Corsten	7:30
7.	"Never Wanted This" (featuring Justine Suissa)	van Buuren; Justine Suissa	4:53
8.	"Astronauts"	van Buuren	5:36
9.	"Stay" (featuring Krezip)	van Buuren; Jacqueline Govaert	5:08
10.	"Wait for You (Song for the Ocean)" (featuring Victoria Horn)	van Buuren; Victoria Horn	7:12
11.	"Sunburn"	van Buuren	6:16
12.	"Communication"	van Buuren	4:16
13.	"Slipstream" (featuring Airwave)	van Buuren; L-Vee	7:07
Total length:			1:15:51

== Charts ==
Chart (2003)	Peak position
Dutch Albums (Album Top 100)	38
