= Rank 1 =

Dutch trance group

- Also known as: R.O.O.S.; Pedro; Benno
- Origin: Netherlands
- Genre: Trance
- Instruments: Macintosh G5 dual 2.5 GHz 1 Gb; Logic 7; Native Instruments Reaktor; Spectrasonics Atmosphere; Spectrasonics Stylus RMX; Korg Legacy Collection; Jacobi 3 way monitors; Mackie Big Knob; M-Audio FW410; Roland JP-8000; Roland TR-909; Roland TR-808; Roland TR-606; Roland TB-303; Korg MS20; Bass guitar; Electric guitar + Roland VG88; Acoustic guitar; Rode NTK Condensor Microphone
- Years active: 1997−present
- Members: Benno de Goeij; Piet Bervoets
- Website: rank-1.com

Rank 1 is a Dutch trance group founded by Piet Bervoets and Benno de Goeij in 1999. Although Piet & Benno had worked together since 1997, Rank 1 was the first project which saw them achieve commercial success beyond the Trance scene. Widely regarded as one of the originators of the Dutch Anthem Trance sound, the group have produced a number of dancefloor hits since their conception.

== Most-streamed chart ==
As of January 2025, their most-streamed tracks on Spotify include "Airwave", "Superstring (Rank 1 Remix)", "Awakening", "L.E.D. There Be Light", "This World Is Watching Me", "The Anthem 2003" (originally released under the alias "Sensation"), "Such Is Life", "Symfo" "Wild And Perfect Day", and "My Enemy (Rank 1 Remix)". In recent times they've also enjoyed success with "The Greater Light To Rule The Night" and "Destination".

This chart reflects the top streamed Rank 1 productions on Spotify: 18 of these have surpassed 1.000.000 streams. Tracks are ranked by cumulative streams since their release; only the highest streamed versions of a track receive a ranking number. The 2014 rework of Airwave and 2016 rework of Superstring were treated as new releases, hence they have been included in the ranking as such.

Rank	Song	Additional info	Artist(s)	Streams (millions)	Release date	Ref.
1	"Airwave (Radio Vocal Mix)"	Innercity 1999 Theme	Rank 1	31.673	1 January 2000	
2	"Superstring (Rank 1 Radio Edit)"	Sensation The Anthem 2000	Cygnus X	16.755	1 July 2000	
	"Airwave (Album Cut)"	Innercity 1999 Theme	Rank 1	12.647	15 May 2002	
3	"Awakening (Radio Edit)"		Rank 1	11.191	3 February 2002	
4	"L.E.D. There Be Light (Single Mix)"	Trance Energy 2009 Anthem	Rank 1	8.832	2 February 2009	
5	"Destination"	A State of Trance 2024 Anthem	Armin van Buuren, Ferry Corsten, Rank 1 and Ruben de Ronde	7.483	22 September 2023	
6	"The Greater Light To Rule The Night"		Armin van Buuren and Rank 1	5.025	30 July 2021	
	"Airwave (Original Mix)"	Innercity 1999 Theme	Rank 1	4.872	1 April 1999	
7	"The Anthem 2003 (Radio Edit)"	Sensation White Anthem 2003	Sensation (Rank 1)	4.173	7 July 2003	
8	"Such Is Life (Radio Edit)"	Sensation The Anthem 2001	Rank 1 feat. Shanokee	3.907	24 September 2001	
9	"This World Is Watching Me (Radio Edit)"		Armin van Buuren vs. Rank 1 feat. Kush	3.595	22 January 2007	
10	"Superstring (Radio Mix)"		Rank 1	3.207	3 June 2016	
	"Superstring (Rank 1 Remix)"	Sensation The Anthem 2000	Cygnus X	1.988	1 July 2000	
	"L.E.D. There Be Light (Extended Mix)"	Trance Energy 2009 Anthem	Rank 1	1.952	2 February 2009	
	"Airwave (Rank 1 vs. Dutch Force Remix)"		Rank 1	1.353	1 April 1999	
11	"Wild And Perfect Day (Radio Mix)"		Rank 1 & Jochen Miller feat. Sarah Bettens	1.141	6 February 2012	
12	"Symfo (Original Mix)"	Sunrise Festival Theme 2009	Rank 1	1.103	7 July 2009	
13	"My Enemy (Rank 1 Remix)"		Super8 & Tab feat. Julie Thompson	1.074	18 January 2011	
14	"Lytherion"		Rank 1	0.972	12 September 2025	
	"Symfo (Sunrise Festival Theme 2009) (Radio Edit)"	Sunrise Festival Theme 2009	Rank 1	0.968	7 July 2009	
15	"Sunrise (Rank 1 Remix)"		Aly & Fila and JES	0.960	12 August 2022	
16	"The Great Escape (Radio Edit)"	EnTrance Theme 2010	Rank 1 vs. Jochen Miller	0.855	16 February 2010	
17	"Airwave (21st Century Mix)"		Rank 1	0.850	8 August 2014	
18	"Reachers Of Civilization (Rank 1 Remix)"		York	0.811	19 February 1999	
	"The Anthem 2003 (Original Mix)"	Sensation White Anthem 2003	Sensation (Rank 1)	0.799	7 July 2003	
19	"Witness"		Cerf, Mitiska & Jaren with Rank 1	0.635	19 March 2012	
20	"Beats At Rank-1 Dotcom (Radio Edit)"	Trance Energy 2005 Anthem	Rank 1	0.554	8 July 2004	
21	"7 Instead Of 8"		Rank 1	0.525	29 October 2012	
22	"Safe (Wherever You Are) (Rank 1 Remix)"		Velvetine	0.486	8 March 2010	

== History ==
=== 1999-2003: The Classic Years ===
The first Rank 1 release was an EP containing "The Citrus Juicer" and "Black Snow". It was the duo's second single "Airwave" however that brought them their biggest hit commercially. It reached No. 10 in the UK Singles Chart and No. 25 in the U.S. Billboard Hot Dance Club Play chart. This was later re-released by Rank 1 remixed with added vocals as "Breathing (Airwave 2003)". Rank 1 reworked it again 11 years later with a modern “EDM” style remix in 2014 bringing their classic into the ‘10s. In 2011, the original version of Airwave was voted the number 1 Trance Classic of all time in the Trance Top 1000 poll. In 2013, Airwave reached number 7. Later in 2021, Airwave was ranked #15 in the A State of Trance Top 1000 list. In the 2024 edition, Airwave crawled back to #12, curiously being surpassed by their then latest single “Destination” which peaked at #9. In 2023 Airwave was remixed by Giuseppe Ottaviani and Alchemyst In September 2000, they performed the track "Many Miles Too Soon" live at Trance Energy as a tribute to the late Miles Stutterheim who was the younger brother of Duncan Stutterheim, one of the founders of the Dutch event organiser ID&T. A year later this track was released as "Such Is Life", with added vocals by Shanokee and chosen as the anthem of Sensation 2001, the first edition where visitors were asked to appear dressed in white.

A year later they released "Awakening" as the single preceding their debut album "Symsonic". The album was released with a CD containing downtempo versions of Airwave and Such Is Life as well as some brand new tracks including the title track, a short version of "The Citrus Juicer", "T.T.C.", "Passage To The Unknown", "Still In My Mind" and more. The album also included a DVD with a few videoclips of their singles up till then as well as their live performance at Trance Energy 2002.

2003 saw the re-release of Airwave with vocals by Aino Laos which were written by Jan Lochel. In a recorded interview, Benno explained that Breathing was released to back up the album release in Germany. Over the summer they were tasked to create the Sensation Anthem for Sensation White 2003: it was a record third time Rank 1 were asked to create the anthem for the event following Such Is Life and their remix for Superstring. Originally this track was released under the alias Sensation as "The Anthem 2003" but in recent times it was renamed Rank 1 - Sensation Anthem 2003: the track peaked at no. 10 in the Dutch Top 40 charts and remained their for 11 weeks. By the end of the year, Rank 1 finally released their single Symsonic under the new title "It's Up To You", with Shanokee asked to provide vocals once more. Unlike the classically inspired Album version, these mixes were produced in the more typical 4x4 driven uplifting trance style, especially the "Instrumental Dub" and "Dub Vocal Mix".

=== 2004-2008: Tech Trance and Electro Trance Era ===
2004 the release of the Symsonic album sampler titled "Unreleased Tracks" which contained extended mixes of "Conspiracy", "Cosmomatic" and "Down From The Deep". Shortly thereafter, Rank 1 radically changed their trademark euphoric sound and released an EP containing "Beats At Rank-1 Dotcom", a brand new tech trance record which ID&T would later pick up as the Trance Energy 2005 Theme. The flipside contained "After Me", a breaks driven string-laced track. The male vocals on this track were rumored to have been performed by Benno de Goeij himself. This would be the start of Rank 1's radical sound shift every few years which would lead to some genre-blending releases.

In February 2005, Rank 1 performed live at Trance Energy for the third time. During this live show they performed a track which was only made for the event. However, the crowd's reaction to it was so immense that Piet and Benno decided to release it as an official track called "Top Gear". This would happen over the summer with another two-track EP: "Opus 17" was present at the flipside and was a moody Trance track unlike its unique heavy Techno-Techtrance influenced B-side.

In February 2006, Piet was interviewed for a WiLDCHiLD event. In this interview he stated that their second album was in progress and that they had made quite some diverse tunes for it, including a breaks track with the potential title "2 Drunk 2 Funk". As of 2024, this track has not been revealed yet. Piet also clarified about the mysterious unreleased and untitled "Rank 1 vs. Marco V" collaboration track that was also mentioned in the FAQ section of their old website.

There were no official single releases during 2006 but in 2007 both "This World Is Watching Me" (with Armin van Buuren and Kush) and "Life Less Ordinary" (with Alex M.O.R.P.H.) were released. Both tracks mixed Electro-driven beats with Trancey strings and saw yet another sound shift from Rank 1. Life Less Ordinary also received an experimental Rank 1 interpretation in the guise of "A Less Ordinary Rank 1 Remix".

Early 2008 saw them release another Electro-style collaboration, this time it was a collaboration with Jochen Miller, titled "And Then...". Rank 1 made an own version of the track which they titled "Rank 1's Minimal Progressive Techno Electro Trance Mix". It was darker and heavier than the original and had a more Techno-driven twist.

=== 2009-2013: New Bigroom Sound and Retro Excursions ===
The duos' track: "L.E.D There Be Light", was chosen as the Trance Energy 2009 Anthem, as well as the background track to the 2009 Electric Daisy Carnival commercial. This track combined the soft-loud synth dynamic from And Then with sweeping strings and more Trancey elements. It leaked out in late 2008, which led to the early release of the "Special Download Mix". The track was officially released in February 2009, with remixes by Wippenberg, Marcel Woods as well as an alternative "Laserlight Rework" by Rank 1 themselves. In 2010, the song was formally remixed by Cold Blank. It is the most successful remix to date, reaching No. 10 on Beatport's Top 100 Electro House Chart. It also landed a release on Ministry Of Sound's Trance Nation 2010 compilation. There were also released some another remixes by tyDi & Trent McDermott, Yvan & Dan Daniel and LoKo. Their next track, "Symfo," was the self-titled Sunrise Festival Theme 2009 and was released only five months after L.E.D. There Be Light. This track received remixes by Marcus Schossow and The Prime Sins, as well as a more House-driven "Rank 1's That Side Mix".

In 2010, Rank 1 and Miller released another collaboration which was chosen as the theme to the Polish Entrance 2010 event called "The Great Escape". Armin van Buuren even played it during his short satellite-connection gig during Trance Energy 2010. On February 11, Benno tweeted there would be an alternative non-Trance Rank 1 Remix of The Great Escape but as of 2024, this version has not been revealed. Whether it has been cancelled or not remains unclear. Two weeks later, Benno tweeted that they would start their own radioshow. Indeed, April 6 saw the start of their monthly one-hour radioshow "Rank 1's Radio Rush" on Afterhours FM, which is aired every first Tuesday of the month between 20:00 - 21:00 CET. A forum on the Rank 1 Hyve contained an updated track list of all the episodes, as well as a list of the (old) Rank 1 Classics played so far. As Hyves later went defunct, all the information on the old Rank 1 fan Hyves was transported to the "Rank 1 Fan Blog" instead. As the summer approached, another collaboration saw the light of day, this time Rank 1 teamed up with Nic Chagall and Wippenberg to release "100", the self-explanatory track to celebrate High Contrast Recordings reaching the 100th milestone release. The vinyl release of the track was a limited edition pressed on gold.

Similar to 2006, 2011 saw no official single releases.

The two singles to follow this "radio silence" were released in February and March respectively, with the Trouse driven "Wild And Perfect Day" providing their third collaboration with Jochen Miller (with vocal support by Sarah Bettens): it peaked at #2 on Beatport's Trance Top 100 chart. Meanwhile "Witness" provided a more typical ‘10s vocal Trancer collaboration in tandem with Cerf, Mitiska & Jaren. It entered the Beatport Trance Top 100 at #69 but didn't manage to crack the Top 10 like most of its counterparts did, peaking at #22. On April 23 the guys announced they had almost finished a brand new track, so far without vocals. After various cryptic Facebook and Twitter updates alike, on the 15th of October they finally revealed that their third 2012 release would be a Rank 1 solo track called "7 Instead Of 8". The single's title referred to its 7/8 time signature. It entered the Beatport Trance Top 100 chart at #27 and fell just short of top spot, peaking at #2.

On December 21, they revealed a 30-second snippet of their collaboration 'Elements Of Nature' with Belgium Trance artist M.I.K.E. This collaboration was initiated by a Twitter user under the name 'Ramballo'. This single was released by the end of January 2013 and received much positive feedback for its Classic Trance vibe and was even rated an 8.5/10 by the DJ Mag; it got them another Beatport Trance Top 100 hit, peaking at #5. On March 13, Conjure One revealed that a Rank 1 Remix for his new single "Under The Gun" would debut during Rank 1's set at ASOT #600 in Mumbai; it entered the Beatport Trance Top 100 chart at #25 and peaked at #3. Just one day later, Rank 1 themselves announced a brand new single 'Floorlifter' to debut on the very same event. Its Beatport Trance Top 100 trajectory saw it enter the charts at #27 and peak at #5 A month later the Rank 1 Remix for Italian Trance artist Giuseppe Ottaviani's single 'Love Will Bring It All Around' was released. Like Witness, it didn't manage to reach further than #22 in the Trance Top 100 on Beatport. Over the course of the summer, Rank 1 announced to be working on a third single. As October passed by, they revealed their new single titled '13.11.11' which combined the track's duration with its release date and tempo. With 13.11.11 Rank 1 secured another Beatport Trance Top 10 hit, peaking at #6.

=== 2014-2022: Mixtures of old and new ===
Their first 2014 single was released on March 17, a collaboration with the German producer Dennis Sheperd titled 'Freudenrausch'; they managed to reach #15 in the Trance Top 100 chart on Beatport. On August 8, their track Airwave was re-released in a modern 129 BPM rework to celebrate 15 years of the Rank 1 project: even though 'Airwave (21st Century Mix)' entered the Beatport Trance Top 100 at #90, it eventually managed to peak at #4 and briefly re-entered the charts for a second peak at #41 four months later. On December 16, DI.FM aired the 56th Radio Rush episode, which was also the radioshow's finale.

Early 2015 saw M.I.K.E. share an Instagram picture of a project he was working on: the title of the project read "MIKEPush vs Rank1 - #JUNO Tracks". On June 18, this collaboration was revealed as the guys' newest collaboration "Juno". It debuted on episode #718 of Armin van Buuren's A State Of Trance Radioshow as 'Tune Of The Week'. On Beatport it entered the Trance Top 100 chart at #17 and peaked at #3. On September 13 both Rank 1 and M.I.K.E. tweeted the same cryptic message: a google search of the sentences they both used seemed to be referring to zenith. A couple of weeks later it turned out that the guys had indeed teamed up again for a third collaboration which they named "Zenith": it was premiered by Markus Schulz on his Global DJ Broadcast radioshow. It would go on to garner massive support from Markus throughout the next few months.

At the end of May 2016, Rank 1 used a cryptic tweet to reveal a new single: it merely read "03.06.2016" and was accompanied by coverart depicting a highway at dawn. In the following days, they revealed they had finished a brand new rework of their old 2000 Remix for Cygnus X - Superstring. Armin van Buuren granted them Tune Of The Week status once more on ASOT #766 and during the episode, Benno gave a short background story on the track: the piano they used in Superstring was the same one that Armin used to play as a child. A month later, Torsten Stenzel, better known as York, released his album Traveller which featured a collaboration with Rank 1 titled "This World Is So Amazing", alongside vocals by Lola Grover, The collaboration was officially released on November 1. The package included remixes by Maglev and Dreamy alongside the original mix.

A few silent months followed. Then, on July 7, 2017, Rank 1 revealed that they would be part of the Dreamstate SoCal line-up, a multi-day Trance event that would take place in the final weekend of November. On Saturday November 25th their first live performance in 4,5 years time took place and the guys seized the opportunity to showcase four brand new tracks alongside the untitled track they performed over various festivals during summer '12. As of December 9, no new material has been released.

On July 27, 2018, Cosmic Gate released their remix of L.E.D. There Be Light, but other than that there were no new releases that year.

When 2019 had got underway, the guys released a brand new single at last: for this occasion they finally delivered a collaboration with Marco V which they titled "We Finally Met". It was premiered on ASOT episode #902 on February 21 and was made Tune Of The Week by Armin. It was the only release they put out in 2019.

For the celebration of the 950th episode of his radioshow, Armin decided he wanted to do something special so he asked Piet & Benno if they were interested in doing a liveshow at the Jaarbeurs to which they agreed. Two and a half years onward from Dreamstate the guys went live again, albeit this time they combined the live playing with some mega-mixing tricks to fit 11 tracks into 30 minutes: they played two brand new untitled tracks, as well as two tracks from their Dreamstate show. On July 31, the live set was released on Spotify and with it, the previously untitled tracks finally received names. In order of appearance, these were: "Transatlantic Communication", "Predictive Memory", "No Name" and "Paris Nice Cannes".

==== 2021 ====
Over the course of July 2021, 15 years after This World Is Watching Me, Armin and Rank 1 released a second collaboration titled 'The Greater Light To Rule The Night'. It was premiered on A State Of Trance #1027 as Tune Of The Week.

==== 2022 ====
Around mid-April 2022, Armin announced his upcoming mix compilation A State Of Trance 2022 which would premiere Aly & Fila and JES - Sunrise (Rank 1 Remix). It was the first Rank 1 Remix in nine years, the last one being Love Will Bring It All Around in 2013. It was officially released on August 12, 2022. By mid October they posted a link to their website with a blurred image; on October 27 they revealed this was 20th anniversary celebration for the release of their 2002 debut album Sysmonic. The website included links to buy Symsonic Deluxe, to stream their Trance Energy 2002 Live performance, to buy official Rank 1 merchandise, as well as a link to buy a copy of only 2000-pressed vinyl releases of the original album.

=== 2023-Present: Return to uptempo (+138 BPM) Trance styles ===
Over the course three streams during June 2023, Armin van Buuren, Ferry Corsten, Benno de Goeij and Ruben de Ronde got together to record the A State Of Trance 2024 Anthem called 'Destination'; the first two of these session were uploaded to YouTube. During the Top 50 Countdown episode 1152, the listeners of the show voted Destination their Tune Of The Year 2023. On December 27, 2024 an official Destination Remix pack was released with remixes by Ben Nicky and Cubicore.

==== 2024 ====
Things would remain quiet until September 2024 when Benno announced he was exploring new directions and launched a new project called BnO in the process. This would be followed by a series of Rank 1 tweets announcing a brand new Rank 1 remix for Lulleaux, BnO & SEM - Take Me Away and revealing a snippet of it respectively. It was officially released on October 25, 2024. Just two weeks later, Rank 1 announced more new music, asking fans "Who’s ready for a Rank 1 original?".

==== 2025 ====
In the first week of February 2025, various artists such as W&W, Bobina, DJ Phalanx and DJ Photographer premiered Rank 1's brand new single "Strobo" on their radioshows, with more support following soon by the likes of Paul van Dyk, Markus Schulz, Armin van Buuren and Ferry Corsten among others. The Original Mix was complemented by the slightly faster and harder "Deeper Dub Mix". Strobo was the first Rank 1 solo single since Superstring in 2016 and first Rank 1 solo production since their four Spotify-released ASOT 950 tracks in 2020. Its Beatport Trance Top 100 trajectory started at #91 and peaked at #20.

On April 15 Benno shared a snippet of a new track he was working on, merely asking fans "Release?". This teaser revealed a distorted and phased melancholic synth melody which in mood sounded reminiscent to Rank 1's earlier tracks Black Snow and Opus 17. Then, on June 27 he shared a new version of the April demo in which he filmed his reaction to a more Classic Trance sounding pluck melody taking over from the previous one midway through the breakdown. On August 15 Benno finally revealed this new Rank 1 tune was going to be called "Lytherion": he shared a screenshot depicting Rank 1's Artist Spotify dashboard which revealed two versions of Lytherion, one with a duration of 6:23 minutes and the other with a duration of 3:19 minutes. This marked the first time since 2013 that Rank 1 were set to release back-to-back solo singles (13.11.11 after Floorlifter). By September 20, Lytherion had gathered support from various DJs such as Armin van Buuren, Steve Allen, Andrew Rayel, Casepeat, Corti Organ, ADDICTIVE SOUNDS, Bobina, DJ D-Line, DJ Phalanx, Eastok, Ithur, JES, Jose Solis, Lightstate, Moroni, Photographer, Rafael Osmo, Ric Aires, Ronski Speed, Steve Meyer, TEKNO and Whitelight. It peaked at #30 in the Beatport Trance Top 100 chart.

==== 2026 ====
On January 9th 2026, Benno shared a teaser of him in the studio, revealing a track with a Classic Trance sounding motif similar to the earlier Rank 1 tracks such as Passage To The Unknown or Elements Of Nature, as well as 2002 remixes such as Dreamland (Rank 1 Re-Edit) for Nu NRG and Mind Made Up (Rank 1 Remix) for JamX & De Leon. On June 26th 2026 he revealed this track was going to be a brand new The Quest tune called "Round Trip". On March 6th the Instagram reels of Ben Norderfeld and Rank 1 shared a story by Benno de Goeij asking, "Does this deserve a Rank 1 Remix" over the cover art of the 12th Ben Norderfeld single "Another", whilst a snippet of the original version played.

On May 8th, music vlogger Twan van Loon a.k.a. Muzikxpress sat down with Benno for an in-depth video-interview on the story behind Airwave and the Rank 1 project in general June 8th saw Benno post a teaser with vocals on Instagram captioned "Preparing masters (finally!)" which revealed the follow-up to Lytherion. A week later he posted another clip with the same track playing, albeit longer: the video was captioned "Rank 1 ft. Notelle - Serotonin", thus confirming the follow-up to Lytherion was set to be released. MaRLo was one of the first DJs to support Serotonin and was soon followed by Armin van Buuren, Tiesto, Above and Beyond and Paul van Dyk, according to 1001tracklists. Over the course of June, Benno's activity on Instagram increased tremendously with several clips per week covering a wide range of different topics: one of these clips focused on an unreleased Rank 1 demo from 2024 called "Waiting On This Day Forever" which actually ended up being released by different artists, as it was on the shelf for too long and the vocalist continued with other producers. Towards the end of the month, Piet reunited with Benno in the studio as they set out to make tracks together again like they used to in 1997-2003. Benno posted some clips of this, offering a rare insight into the guys' workflow and interactions in the studio. On June 30th Benno posted a clip on his Instagram stories to reveal the masters for this first reunion track were being uploaded. The title was revealed to be "Reuneyeted".

== Beatport Trance Top 100 ranking ==
This chart reflects the performance of Rank 1 productions on Beatport. Data taken from BeatStats: no data prior to 2012 exists, hence this list starts with Wild And Perfect Day.

	Song	Artist(s)	Beatport Chart	Peaked at	Date	Ref.
1	"Wild And Perfect Day (Extended Mix)"	Rank 1 & Jochen Miller feat. Sarah Bettens	Trance Top 100	#2	13 February 2012	
2	"Witness (Original Club Mix)"	Cerf, Mitiska & Jaren with Rank 1	Trance Top 100	#22	24 March 2012	
3	"7 Instead Of 8 (Original Mix)"	Rank 1	Trance Top 100	#2	3 November 2012	
4	"Elements Of Nature (Original Mix)"	Rank 1 vs. M.I.K.E.	Trance Top 100	#5	4 February 2013	
5	"Under The Gun (Rank 1 Remix)"	Conjure One feat. Leigh Nash	Trance Top 100	#3	23 April 2013	
5	"Under The Gun (Rank 1 Remix)"	Conjure One feat. Leigh Nash	Overall Top 100	#86	22 April 2013	
6	"Floorlifter (Original Mix)"	Rank 1	Trance Top 100	#5	4 May 2013	
7	"Love Will Bring It All Around (Rank 1 Remix)"	Giuseppe Ottaviani feat. Eric Lumiere	Trance Top 100	#22	13 May 2013	
8	"13.11.11 (Original Mix)"	Rank 1	Trance Top 100	#6	18 November 2013	
9	"Freudenrausch (Original Mix)"	Rank 1 & Dennis Sheperd	Trance Top 100	#15	24 March 2014	
10	"Airwave (21st Century Mix)"	Rank 1	Trance Top 100	#4	14 August 2014	
11	"Juno (Original Mix)"	Rank 1 vs. M.I.K.E. Push	Trance Top 100	#3	26 July 2015	
12	"Zenith (Original Mix)"	M.I.K.E. Push & Rank 1	Trance Top 100	#11	15 November 2015	
13	"Superstring (Extended Mix)"	Rank 1	Trance Top 100	#7	15 June 2016	
14	"We Finally Met (Extended Mix)"	Marco V & Rank 1	Trance Top 100	#16	6 March 2019	
15	"The Greater Light To Rule The Night (Extended Mix)"	Armin van Buuren & Rank 1	Trance Top 100	#3	9 August 2021	
16	"Sunrise (Rank 1 Extended Remix)"	Aly & Fila and JES	Trance Top 100	#11	9 August 2021	
17	"Destination (ASOT 2024 Anthem) (Extended Mix)"	Armin van Buuren, Ferry Corsten, Rank 1 & Ruben de Ronde	Trance (Mainfloor) Top 100	#1	29 September 2023	
17	"Destination (ASOT 2024 Anthem) (Extended Mix)"		Overall Top 100	#54	29 September 2023	
18a	"Strobo (Extended Mix)"	Rank 1	Trance (Mainfloor) Top 100	#20	2 March 2025	
18b	"Strobo (Deeper Dub Extended Mix)"	Rank 1	Trance (Mainfloor) Top 100	#41	5 March 2025	
19	"Lytherion"	Rank 1	Trance (Mainfloor) Top 100	#30	20 September 2025	
20	"Serotonin"	Rank 1 & Notelle	Trance (Mainfloor) Top 100	#23	30 August 2026	
21	"Reuneyeted"	Rank 1	Trance (Mainfloor) Top 100	#32	10 November 2026	

== Discography ==
=== Albums ===
- 2002 Symsonic including "Symsonic", "Cosmomatic", "Conspiracy", "T.T.C.", "Down From The Deep", "Equilibrium", "Passage To The Unknown" and "Still In My Mind"
- 2020 Live at ASOT 950 including "Transatlantic Communication", "Predictive Memory", "No Name" and "Paris Nice Cannes"
- 2022 Symsonic Deluxe including the first ever vinyl release of the original Symsonic, a digitally remastered expanded version of the album with remixes of "Airwave", "Breathing", "It's Up To You" and "Unreleased Tracks From The Album Symsonic"

=== As Rank 1 ===
- 1999 "Black Snow / The Citrus Juicer"
- 1999 "Airwave" (Innercity Theme 1999)
- 2001 "Such Is Life" (with Shanokee) (Sensation Anthem 2001)
- 2002 "Awakening" (with Olga Zegers)
- 2003 "Breathing (Airwave 2003)" (with Aino Laos)
- 2003 "It's Up To You (Symsonic)" (with Shanokee)
- 2004 "Beats At Rank-1 Dotcom (Trance Energy Anthem 2005) / After Me"
- 2004 "Unreleased Tracks From The Album Symsonic" (inc. Extended Mixes for "Conspiracy", "Cosmomatic" and "Down From The Deep")
- 2005 "Opus 17 / Top Gear"
- 2007 "This World Is Watching Me" (with Armin van Buuren and Kush)
- 2007 "Life Less Ordinary" (with Alex M.O.R.P.H. and Fragma)
- 2008 "And Then..."(with Jochen Miller)
- 2009 "L.E.D There Be Light" (Trance Energy Anthem 2009)
- 2009 "Symfo" (Sunrise Festival Theme 2009)
- 2010 "The Great Escape" (with Jochen Miller) (Entrance Theme 2010)
- 2010 "100" (with Nic Chagall and Wippenberg)
- 2012 "Wild And Perfect Day" (with Jochen Miller and Sarah Bettens)
- 2012 "Witness" (with Cerf, Mitiska & Jaren)
- 2012 "7 Instead Of 8"
- 2013 "Elements Of Nature" (with M.I.K.E.)
- 2013 "Floorlifter"
- 2013 "13.11.11"
- 2014 "Freudenrausch" (with Dennis Sheperd)
- 2014 "Airwave (21st Century Mix)"
- 2015 "Juno" (with M.I.K.E.)
- 2015 "Zenith" (with M.I.K.E.)
- 2016 "Superstring"
- 2016 "This World Is So Amazing" (with York and Lola)
- 2019 "We Finally Met" (with Marco V)
- 2021 "The Greater Light To Rule The Night" (with Armin van Buuren)
- 2023 "Destination (A State Of Trance 2024 Anthem)" (with Armin van Buuren, Ferry Corsten and Ruben de Ronde)
- 2025 "Strobo"
- 2025 "Lytherion"
- 2026 "Serotonin" (with Notelle)
- 2026 "Reuneyeted"

=== As R.O.O.S. ===
- 1997 "Instant Moments (Skyline Mix)"
- 1997 "Instant Moments (Waiting For)" (with Evelyne Derks)
- 1998 "Living in a Dream"
- 1999 "Body, Mind & Spirit"
- 2002 "Instant Moments 2002"

=== As Pedro & Benno ===
- 1997 "Scream For Love"
- 1998 "Talkin' To You"
- 1999 "Speechless"

=== As A.I.D.A. ===
- 1999 "Far And Away"
- 1999 "Far And Away/Merit"
- 1999 "Remember Me/Corvana"

=== Other aliases ===
- 1997 "Human Beast", as Simplistic Mind
- 1997 "Baby Freak", as Precious People
- 1997 "Reflections of Love", as Precious People
- 1998 "To the Church", as Two Disciples
- 1998 "I Know You're There", as Tritone (with DJ Misjah)
- 1998 "Ssst... (Listen)", as Jonah (with DJ Misjah)
- 1998 "Subspace Interference", as Control Freaks (with DJ Tiesto)
- 1998 "Play it Rough", as System Eight (with Michel Keyser)
- 1999 "Human Planetarium", as Gualagara
- 2000 "Yeah... Right", as Jonah (with DJ Misjah)
- 2000 "Straight to the Point", as SPX (with DJ Misjah)
- 2003 "The Anthem 2003", as Sensation
- 2003 "Perfect Blend / Deep Ranger", as Mac J
- 2004 "Womanizer / Nightware", as Mac J
- 2005 "Dreamchild / Flash", as Johan Gielen
- 2005 "The World / Another World" as JOOP
- 2010 "Griffin", as Artento Divini
- 2023 "Prototype - Soundpiercing (SUPERSTRINGS Remix), as SUPERSTRINGS
- 2024 "What Ya Got 4 Me", as SUPERSTRINGS

=== New solo Benno aliases ===
- 2024 "Take Me Away" as BnO (with Lulleaux and SEM)
- 2025 "Before You Love Me" as BnO (with Lulleaux)
- 2025 "Moment With You" as BnO (with Lulleaux and Nova Tropics)
- 2025 "On Repeat" as BnO (feat. Cartouche)
- 2025 "Aurelian" as Ben Norderfeld
- 2025 "Fusion" as Ben Norderfeld
- 2025 "Past Memories" as Ben Norderfeld
- 2025 "Who What Where" as Ben Norderfeld
- 2025 "Blaksaeter" as Ben Norderfeld
- 2025 "Feel Like Tomorrow" as BnO (with Lulleaux and Josh Cumbee)
- 2025 "Paralyzed" as Ben Norderfeld
- 2025 "Ambiance de Lyon" as Ben Norderfeld
- 2025 "In Place" as Ben Norderfeld
- 2026 "Shape" as Ben Norderfeld
- 2026 "Views" as Ben Norderfeld
- 2026 "Space Arp" as Ben Norderfeld
- 2026 "Aurelian [Album]" as Ben Norderfeld including: "Aurelian", "Past Memories", "Shape", "Ambiance de Lyon", "Blaksaeter", "Fusion", "In Place", "Space Arp", "Views", "Paralyzed" and "Who What Where"
- 2026 "Borealis [Album]" as Ben Norderfeld including: "Oidua", "Black Cover", "Source", "Selected", "Scenting", "Xyno", "Isolation", "Abyss", "Inclusion", "Aligned", "Remote", "Once" and "Progress"
- 2026 "Another" as Ben Norderfeld
- 2026 "siraP" as Ben Norderfeld
- 2026 "Collision" as Ben Norderfeld
- 2026 "Instant" as Ben Norderfeld
- 2026 "Flakes Of Heaven" as Ben Norderfeld
- 2026 "One" as Ben Norderfeld
- 2026 "Leaflets" as Ben Norderfeld
- 2026 "Helios" as Ben Norderfeld
- 2026 "Haven" as Ben Norderfeld
- 2026 "Plage" as Ben Norderfeld
- 2026 "Timeloop" as Ben Norderfeld
- 2026 "Staircase" as Ben Norderfeld
- 2026 "Heartbeat" as Ben Norderfeld
- 2026 "Analyse" as Ben Norderfeld
- 2026 "Void" as Ben Norderfeld
- 2026 "Celestium [Album]" as Ben Norderfeld including: "Another", "siraP", "Collision",

"One", "Leaflets", "Helios", "Haven", "Plage", "Timeloop", "Staircase", "Heartbeat", "Analyse" and "Void"

- 2026 "Telesophia" as Ben Norderfeld
- 2026 "Glacier" as Ben Norderfeld
- 2026 "Wired" as Ben Norderfeld
- 2026 "Continents" as Ben Norderfeld
- 2026 "Shifting" as Ben Norderfeld
- 2026 "Movement" as Ben Norderfeld
- 2026 "Stepping Stones" as Ben Norderfeld
- 2026 "Short Memory" as Ben Norderfeld
- 2026 "Attraction" as Ben Norderfeld
- 2026 "Flare" as Ben Norderfeld
- 2026 "Instant" as Ben Norderfeld
- 2026 "Gravity" as Ben Norderfeld

=== Revived aliases ===
- 2026 "For Those Who Dare" as Dutch Force
- 2026 "Round Trip" as The Quest
- 2026 "Another Day, Another Riff" as Dutch Force

== Remixes ==
- 1999 "Reachers Of Civilization", by York
- 2000 "Blue Lagoon", by Tunnel Allstars
- 2000 "Cry", by System F (with Saskia Lie-Atjam)
- 2000 "Perfect Moment", by Mary Griffin
- 2000 "Superstring", by Cygnus X
- 2000 "Let Me Be Your Fantasy", by Baby D
- 2000 "It's My Turn", by Angelic (with Amanda O'Riordan)
- 2000 "Home", by Chakra (with Kate Cameron) (Unreleased)
- 2001 "Far Away", by Ayumi Hamasaki
- 2001 "Underwater", by Delerium (with Rani Kamal)
- 2002 "Ligaya", by Gouryella (Unreleased)
- 2002 "Dreamland", by Nu NRG
- 2002 "Dearest", by Ayumi Hamasaki
- 2002 "Sound Of Love", by Marc Aurel
- 2002 "Mind Made Up", by Jam X & De Leon
- 2003 "Journey Of Life", by Push
- 2004 "Touch Me", by Angel City (with Lara McAllen)
- 2005 "Lyteo", by Mr Sam (with Kirsty Hawkshaw)
- 2005 "Humanity", by ATB (with Tiff Lacey)
- 2006 "This Way", by Ronald van Gelderen
- 2006 "Love Kills", by Freddie Mercury
- 2007 "Analog Feel", by Cosmic Gate
- 2007 "The Future", by JOOP
- 2007 "Touch The Sun", by Alex Bartlett and Andy Guess (with Anthya)
- 2008 "Undone", by Anton Sonin & AMX (with Sari)
- 2008 "On Fire", by Marcel Woods (with MC Da Silva)
- 2008 "Embrace Me", by Ronald van Gelderen
- 2008 "Lost Luggage", by Leon Bolier and Jonas Steur
- 2010 "Safe (Wherever You Are)", by Velvetine
- 2010 "24 Hours", by Mat Zo
- 2010 "Fire Wire", by Cosmic Gate
- 2011 "My Enemy", by Super8 & Tab (with Julie Thompson)
- 2013 "Under The Gun", by Conjure One (with Leigh Nash)
- 2013 "Love Will Bring It All Around", by Giuseppe Ottaviani (with Eric Lumiere)
- 2022 "Sunrise", by Aly & Fila (with Jes Brieden)
- 2024 "Take Me Away", by Lulleaux, BnO & SEM
- 2026 "Another", by Ben Norderfeld

=== DJ compilations ===
- 2004 ID&T presents Rank 1 (Universal TV)
- 2004 Rank 1 - A Trip in Trance 4 (Hi Bias Records Inc.)
- 2004 Matt Darey & Rank 1 - Ultimate Trance (Central Station)
- 2005 Rank 1? Live Mix @ Castle Dance (Dance Planet Ltd)
- 2008 High Contrast presents Rank 1 (High Contrast Recordings)
- 2008 Talla 2XLC in Touch with Rank 1 - Techno Club Vol. 28 (CD2 mixed by Rank 1)
- 2009 Trance Energy 2009 (CD2 mixed by Rank 1)
- 2010 EnTrance presents High Contrast (CD1 mixed by Rank 1) (High Contrast Recordings)
- 2011 Trance Nation: Rank 1 (Ministry of Sound UK)
- 2013 A State of Trance 600: The Expedition (CD4 mixed by Rank 1) (Armada)

=== Live performances ===
- 2000 Rank 1 Live At Trance Energy 2000-09-30
- 2001 Rank 1 Live At Sensation 2001-07-07
- 2002 Rank 1 Live At Trance Energy 2002-02-16
- 2005 Rank 1 Live At Trance Energy 2005-02-12
- 2006 Rank 1 Live At Armin Only 2006-11-11
- 2009 Rank 1 Live At Trance Energy 2009-03-07 (surprise performance)
- 2009 Rank 1 Live At Sunrise Festival 2009-07-24
- 2010 Rank 1 Live At Dance Valley 2010-08-07
- 2012 Rank 1 Live At EDC Las Vegas 2012-06-09
- 2012 Rank 1 Live At Sunrise Festival 2012-07-21
- 2012 Rank 1 Live At Nature One 2012-08-03
- 2013 Rank 1 Live At Back In The House 2013-05-19
- 2017 Rank 1 Live At Dreamstate SoCal 2017-11-25
- 2020 Rank 1 Live At ASOT 950 2020-02-15
