= Riley & Durrant =

Electronic music production and DJ duo

Riley & Durrant are an English electronic music production and DJ duo based in Leeds, West Yorkshire, England.

Andi Durrant and Nick Riley met whilst DJing together at Sheffield super-club Gatecrasher in 2002 and have been producing music since 2003.

Most notable for their UK radio shows and residencies at Privilege Ibiza, Riley & Durrant have been influential in playing and promoting underground electronic music in the UK for the last 20 years.

== Radio ==
Between them, Riley & Durrant formerly presented two specialist dance programs on the Galaxy FM network, including Andi Durrant's Saturday Warmup and their Friday night "Nu Breed" showcase for underground, unsigned and unheard electronic music.

Andi Durrant went on to present Friday and Saturday night's on The Capital FM Network across the UK, before moving to Kiss Fresh and Kisstory.

They also run their own production company This Is Distorted, making specialist radio shows, documentaries and idents for UK and international radio stations.

In 2007, Andi Durrant won the bronze award at the Sony Radio Academy Awards. In 2008, he received the Gold Award as Music Broadcaster of the Year, and in 2009 he won the Silver award for best Specialist Music Program.

They have also previously been heard on Vonyc Radio in Germany, and regularly on Dubai 92, Global Radio and HFM Ibiza.

== DJ highlights ==
They have played at most of the UK dance festivals from Creamfields to Global Gathering and played internationally across Russia, Asia, USA and Europe. They are one of the few British acts to have played at the Fort Dance festival in St Petersberg, where they did their first live set in 2004.

On New Year's Eve 2007/08 Riley & Durrant headlined their own event on the world's largest man-made beach in Kaula Lumpur, Malaysia.

Andi and Nick have been regulars in Ibiza during the summer months, playing at Café Mambo, and broadcasting live from Amnesia, Space and Eden.

For the 2008 and 2009 Ibiza seasons Riley & Durrant were part of the biggest night in Ibiza when they were asked to be weekly residents at Privilege Ibiza (Worlds Biggest Club) to provide the sound of the second room at Tiësto’s sell-out concerts and warm up for him in the main room. In 2010 Riley & Durrant will be playing the Terrace for rival club Cream at Amnesia with Calvin Harris.

Most weekends Riley & Durrant can be found playing across Britain from the famous superclubs like Cream, Gatecrasher, Ministry of Sound and Godskitchen, to smaller more intimate venues around the country.

== Studio ==
In 2008 Nick and Andi opened a recording studio in Leeds City Centre with fellow Leeds residents The Utah Saints.

== Music and releases ==
The first few Riley & Durrant releases in 2003 sat firmly in the trance and melodic genres, on European record labels like Black Hole and United, including their debut track "Candesco" (of which only 500 copies were ever pressed onto vinyl but subsequently became a collectors classic, with copies going for over £50 on eBay). Over the subsequent years, Riley & Durrant have become difficult to pigeon-hole musically, with support for their music coming from a wide cross section of DJs – from underground house heroes like Laurent Garnier, Krafty Kuts and Sander Klienenberg to superstars Armin Van Buuren, Laidback Luke, Axwell, Paul Van Dyk and Tiesto.

Their debut artist album Research & Development was released summer 2007, and reached the iTunes top 50 in the first month of sales, receiving critical acclaim for its unique genre-bending sound:

- "Adventurous and experimental – 4 Stars" – IDJ Mag
- "Without a doubt the best artist album of the year" – Contactmusic.com
- "This album will cross boundaries" – Dancenode
- "Quirky but Cool" – Mixmag
- "This only serves to emphasize how far R&D have come – 4/5" – DJ Magazine

Alongside their commercial releases, Riley & Durrant have written a number of pieces of music for film and television, such as Sky One and ITV.

== Record label ==
In 2007, Riley & Durrant launched their Nu Breed Music record label to put out some of the vast number of tracks they were being sent by young up-and-coming music producers for their radio shows.

Nu Breed Music was closed in 2008 following a settlement with Ministry of Sound to use the trademark for their Global Underground compilations.

Riley & Durrant launched the Electrik Playground record label and club nights in 2009

== Discography ==
=== Original tracks and singles ===
- Hauswerks vs Riley & Durrant – Bellydancer (303 Lovers) June 10
- Riley & Durrant ft This Morning Call – All I Leave Behind (Electric Playground) May 10
- Council Estate Supermodels ft Riley & Durrant – Keep Smiling (Electrik Playground) Apr 10
- Riley & Durrant vs Juan Kidd – "Da Bass" (CR2) Feb 2010
- Riley & Durrant – "Jagerbomb" (Electrik Playground) Nov 09
- Riley & Durrant – "Remote Control" (Nu Breed Music) Jun 08
- Electrik Playground – "Electrik Playground" (Nu Breed Music) Jun 08
- Riley & Durrant – "Aurora" (Newstate Music) Jan 08
- Riley & Durrant with Hauswerks – Experiment No. 2 (Newstate Music) Jan 08
- Riley & Durrant ft Gina Dootson – "Hollow" (Newstate Music) June 07
- Riley & Durrant "Neon Eyes" (United) March 06
- Riley & Durrant "Home" (Blackhole) Jan 06
- Riley & Durrant "The Code" (Blackhole) Jan 06
- Riley & Durrant "Suddenly" (Monster) Nov 05
- Riley & Durrant "Exile" (Distorted) April 04
- Riley & Durrant "Candesco" (Recover) May 03

=== Remixes ===
- Karen Ruimy – Come With Me (Andi Durrant & Steve More Remix) / (Riley & Durrant Remix) Sept 12
- Sulpher vs Riley & Durrant – Tomorrow (Original) White June 2012
- Paul Van Dyk – Eternity (Riley & Durrant Remix) 3Beat March 2012
- Chicane – Thousand Mile Stare (Riley & Durrant Remix) Modena Nov 2011
- Kerli – Army of Love (Riley & Durrant Remix / Dub) Island Records USA June 2011
- Laidback Luke, Steve Aoki & Lil John – Turbulence (Riley & Durrant Remix) Newstate June 2011
- Sarah Atereth – Without You (Riley & Durrant Remix) March 2011
- Backyard Orchestra – Smiling Faces (Original and Riley & Durrant Mixes) CR2 Summer 2011
- Felix Leiter vs Dario G – Sunchyme 2010 (Riley & Durrant Remix) Electrik Playground Nov 2010
- D:Ream – Gods In the Making (Riley & Durrant Remix) Feb 2011
- K Klass – Capture Me (Riley & Durrant Mix) Nocturnal Groove Jan 2011
- Moog Daddies – Gucha (Riley & Durrant Remix) Oxyd Records July 2010
- Hannah – I Believe (Riley & Durrant Remix) Snowdog Records June 2010
- Scott Mac – Damager (Riley & Durrant Remix) Black Hole April 2010
- Chicane – Are You Listening (Riley & Durrant Remix) Modena April 2010
- 68 Beats – Are You Listening (Riley & Durrant Mix) Juicy Music Jan 2010
- Snow Patrol – Just Say Yes (Riley & Durrant Mix)
- Dimitri Vegas & Like Mike – Under The Water (Riley & Durrant Mix) BHM Oct 09
- Blue Pearl – Naked In The Rain (Riley & Durrant Mix) Suesse
- Origin Unknown – Valley of the Shadows (Bootleg Remix) (White) Feb 09
- Just Jack – Embers (Bootleg Remix) (White) Feb 09
- Sylvia Tosun ft Loverush UK – 5 Reasons (SeatoSun) Jan 09
- DJ Antoine – This TIme (AATW) Jan 09
- Juan Kidd – "Putayn" (Nu Breed Music) Aug 09
- Cube Guys – "Baba O’Riley" (Data Records) Jun 08
- Richard Coleman – "Haymaker" (Suesse Records) May 8
- CNTRL ALT DLETE – "Hit My Stix" (Bandito Records) May 8
- Brother Brown – "Under the Water" (White) April 8
- Nicky C – Seasons (Nu Breed Music) April 8
- Mark Brown – The Journey (CR2 / Positiva) Feb 08
- Utah Saints – What Can You Do For Me (White) Feb 08
- Congress – 40 Miles (All Around the World) Sept 07
- Jes – Heaven (Black Hole) May 7
- Arno Cost & Arias "Magenta" (CR2), April 7
- Alex Gold & Phil Oakey – LA Today (Xtravaganza) Jan 07
- Tall Paul & Dave Aude "Common Ground" (Instinct), May 06
- Scott Mac "It Must Have Been A Dream" (ATCR), Oct 05
- Cosmic Gate "I Feel Wonderful" (Maelstrom), Aug 05
- Airbiscuit "Lately" (Zenith Cafe), May 05
- Way Out West – "Don’t Forget Me" (Distinctive), March 05
- Hiratzka and Kazell "Venice Dawn" (SR2), Feb 05
- Armin Van Buuren – "Burned With Desire" (Nebula), Jan 05
- Lustral "Every Time" (Earth) June 4
- Space Brothers "Wings Across The Universe" (Boss) April 04
- Space Brothers – One More Chance (Boss) Jan 04

=== Artist albums ===
- Riley & Durrant – Research & Development (Newstate Music) Jul 07
  Track list:
  1. Introduction
  2. Experiment No 1
  3. Hollow (ft Gina Dootson)
  4. Aurora
  5. Dead Of The Night (ft Gina Dootson)
  6. Monday Blues
  7. Tear Down The Walls (ft Gina Dootson & Paul Maddox)
  8. Experiment No 2 (ft Hauswerks)
  9. Rock School
  10. My Enemy (ft Ben Renwick)
  11. Magnificent Love (f Gina Dootson)
  12. Candesco (2007 Mix)
