= Alright Now (song) =

Single by Above & Beyond and Justine Suissa

from the album Common Ground
- Released: 12 May 2017
- Genre: Progressive trance, progressive house
- Length: 4:05 (club mix); 6:58 (extended club mix); 5:37 (album version)
- Label: Anjunabeats
- Songwriters: Jonathan "Jono" Grant; Tony McGuinness; Paavo Siljamaki; Justine Suissa

Above & Beyond and Justine Suissa singles chronology
"1001" (2017)	"Alright Now" (2017)	"Surge" (2017)

"Alright Now" is a song by trance group Above & Beyond and singer-songwriter Justine Suissa. It debuted on the US Dance/Mix Show Airplay chart on Billboard.

== Track listing ==
"Alright Now" single track listing
No.	Title	Length
1.	"Alright Now" (Above & Beyond Club Mix)	4:05
2.	"Alright Now" (Above & Beyond Extended Club Mix)	6:58

== Charts ==
Chart performance for "Alright Now"
Chart (2017)	Peak position
US Dance Airplay (Billboard)	34
