= Common Ground (Above & Beyond album) =

Studio album by Above & Beyond
- Released: 26 January 2018
- Recorded: 2017
- Genre: Trance
- Length: 62:09
- Label: Anjunabeats
- Producer: Above & Beyond; Andrew Bayer; Zoe Johnston; Justine Suissa

Above & Beyond chronology
Acoustic II (2016)	Common Ground (2018)	Flow State (2019)

Singles from Common Ground
- 1. "Alright Now" Released: 12 May 2017; 2. "Tightrope" Released: 4 August 2017; 3. "My Own Hymn" Released: 7 September 2017; 4. "Northern Soul" Released: 3 November 2017; 5. "Always" Released: 19 January 2018; 6. "Cold Feet" Released: 16 March 2018; 7. "Happiness Amplified" Released: 5 October 2018; 8. "Sahara Love" Released: 8 March 2019; 9. "Bittersweet & Blue" Released: 27 March 2020

Common Ground is the fourth studio album by British progressive trance group Above & Beyond. It was released on 26 January 2018 on Anjunabeats. The album is their first studio album since We Are All We Need (2015) and includes appearances from frequent collaborators Richard Bedford, Justine Suissa, and Zoë Johnston plus new guest vocalist Marty Longstaff. Common Ground charted at number three in the United States, making it the biggest US chart debut by a British electronic group and Above & Beyond's highest career charting album release.

== Release and promotion ==
In an interview with Billboard coinciding with Ultra Music Festival 2017, Above & Beyond revealed that the group was about "three-quarters of the way through" with their work on a new electronic album. The single "Tightrope" featuring Marty Longstaff and the title track "Common Ground" (originally titled "The Power of Vulnerability") was also premiered at Ultra 2017 and at the group's RC Cola Plant show two days before.

The confetti-inspired artwork style for the album was revealed with the release of "Tightrope" on 4 August and the following release of "My Own Hymn", accompanied by a lyric video, on 8 September.

The album title and cover were revealed at the end of the group's performance at their ABGT 250 event on 16 September 2017.

On 23 October 2017, the group announced the Common Ground North America Tour, which opened with a 3-hour set and appearances from Spencer Brown, Grum, and Gabriel & Dresden at the Los Angeles Convention Center on 29 December 2017 and closed at the RC Cola Plant in Miami accompanied by Seven Lions on 22 March 2018.

"Northern Soul", the fourth single from Common Ground, was released on 4 November with another lyric video.

The trio released the album's fifth single, "Always", on 19 January 2018. For this single's release, the group also released a music video featuring the three producers and vocalist Zoë Johnston performing the song in the French Alps. Also, the album version of "Is It Love? (1001)" was premiered that night by Pete Tong on BBC Radio 1's Essential Selection mix.

There’s a continual play off, between what the individual wants and the group needs, what the album requires and what an individual song might demand.

—Paavo Siljamäki, regarding the songwriting process on Common Ground

On 26 January 2018, Armin van Buuren's "A State of Trance" radio show celebrated the album's release by hosting Jono Grant of Above & Beyond to perform a one-hour-long guest mix for their 850th episode, where multiple tracks from Common Ground and label Anjunabeats were played during its duration.

When asked about the creative process of the album in an interview with Clash magazine, Paavo Siljamäki of the group stated that "there’s a point in the album writing process where it starts making sense, once you have enough songs. But what we did this time around – and we’ve done it in the past – we’ve written quite a few more songs than what is on this album. And then we looked at the pile of songs that we had, and thought: what would make a good album? And chose the tracks finished based on what we felt helped each other".

== Critical reception ==
Professional ratings
Review scores
Source	Rating
The Arts Desk	3/5 stars
The Times	2/5 stars

Common Ground was met with generally positive reviews from music critics. Joe Muggs from The Arts Desk gave the album a 3/5 rating and wrote that "it sounds like somewhere between Coldplay and Clannad with pumping beats and fizzy synthesisers". He continued by stating that although the track melodies might be simple and "cheesy", they're "put together with such sincerity you can see easily why their fan community clings so tight to A&B". Mark Mancino of The Nocturnal Times called the album an "artistic masterpiece" and a "symphonic treasure". He praised each track individually, but especially commended single "Northern Soul" which he calls the "catchiest, deepest, and most intense in years", and "Sahara Love" which "intertwines elevating dance music with elements of rock, new wave, and synth-pop". Thomas Keulemans from We Rave You dubbed the track "Bittersweet & Blue" as the album's best highlight by praising Richard Bedford's ability to create a sense of sadness throughout its duration and noted its meaningful lyrical content.

In a negative review, Will Hodgkinson of The Times described that the record "sounds like the kind of music that utilities companies use when they want to calm you down as they put you on hold for an hour: relentlessly slick, unfailingly melodic, impossible to remember the moment it finishes". The critic concluded by writing that Common Ground ultimately lacks "humour and character", even with the use of gentle vocals and the presence of a hypnotic mood throughout its listening experience.

== Track listing ==
No.	Title	Writer(s)	Producer(s)	Length
1.	"The Inconsistency Principle"	Jonathan "Jono" Grant; Tony McGuinness; Paavo Siljamaki	Above & Beyond; Andrew Bayer^{[a]}	3:16
2.	"My Own Hymn" (featuring Zoë Johnston)	Grant; McGuinness; Siljamaki; Zoë Johnston	Above & Beyond; Johnston; Bayer^{[a]}	3:48
3.	"Northern Soul" (featuring Richard Bedford)	Grant; Siljamaki; McGuinness	Above & Beyond; Bayer^{[a]}	5:35
4.	"Naked" (featuring Justine Suissa)	Grant; McGuinness; Justine Suissa; Siljamaki; Andrew Bayer	Above & Beyond; Suissa; Bayer^{[a]}	5:23
5.	"Sahara Love" (featuring Zoë Johnston)	Grant; McGuinness; Siljamaki; Johnston; Bayer	Above & Beyond; Johnston; Bayer^{[a]}	5:07
6.	"Happiness Amplified" (featuring Richard Bedford)	Grant; Siljamaki; McGuinness; Bayer	Above & Beyond; Bayer^{[a]}	5:32
7.	"Is It Love? (1001)"	Grant; McGuinness; Siljamaki	Above & Beyond; Bayer^{[a]}	5:44
8.	"Cold Feet" (featuring Justine Suissa)	Grant; McGuinness; Suissa; Siljamaki	Above & Beyond; Suissa; Bayer^{[a]}	5:35
9.	"Tightrope" (featuring Marty Longstaff)	Grant; Martin Longstaff; McGuinness; Siljamaki; Bayer	Above & Beyond; Bayer^{[a]}	3:24
10.	"Alright Now" (featuring Justine Suissa)	Grant; Suissa; Siljamaki; McGuinness	Above & Beyond; Suissa; Bayer^{[a]}	5:37
11.	"Bittersweet & Blue" (featuring Richard Bedford)	Grant; McGuinness; Suissa; Siljamaki	Above & Beyond; Suissa; Bayer^{[a]}	5:26
12.	"Always" (featuring Zoë Johnston)	Grant; McGuinness; Siljamaki; Johnston	Above & Beyond; Johnston; Bayer^{[a]}	4:10
13.	"Common Ground"	Grant; McGuinness; Siljamaki	Above & Beyond; Bayer^{[a]}	3:32
Total length:				62:09

Notes

- ^{^[a]} signifies an additional producer
- "Is It Love? (1001)" features un-credited vocals from Jono Grant.

== Charts ==
=== Weekly charts ===
Chart (2018)	Peak position
Australian Albums (ARIA)	55
Belgian Albums (Ultratop Flanders)	111
Canadian Albums (Billboard)	61
Czech Albums (ČNS IFPI)	51
Dutch Albums (Album Top 100)	190
New Zealand Heatseeker Albums (RMNZ)	7
Scottish Albums (OCC)	28
Slovak Albums (ČNS IFPI)	67
UK Albums (OCC)	41
UK Dance Albums (OCC)	2
US Billboard 200	3
US Top Dance Albums (Billboard)	1
US Digital Albums (Billboard)	10
US Independent Albums (Billboard)	1

=== Year-end charts ===
Chart (2018)	Position
US Top Dance/Electronic Albums (Billboard)	19

== Awards ==
Year	Organization	Recipient(s)	Category	Result
2019	International Dance Music Awards	Common Ground	Best Pop/Electronic Album	Won
