= Eelke Kleijn =

Dutch producer and DJ

- Born: 11 June 1983 (age 41)
- Origin: Rotterdam, Netherlands
- Genres: Techno, house
- Occupation(s): Producer, DJ
- Years active: 2003–present
- Labels: Days Like Nights, Armada Music, Sony Music Entertainment, Spinnin' Records, EMI, Ministry of Sound, Global Underground, Toolroom, Suara
- Website: http://eelkekleijn.nl

Eelke van Kleijn (born 11 June 1983) is a Dutch producer and DJ from Rotterdam, Netherlands. He is known mostly for his electronic dance music and also produces music for other media, such as television series, commercials, movie trailers and animation.

== Career ==
In his early career (between 2003 and 2005), he produced electronic records as MI.D.O.R. and Six4Eight, and he was responsible for some of the DJ Precision releases and remixes. Kleijn's first release as Eelke Kleijn was '4.5 Billion Years' in 2003 on Segment Records. Since 2005, he has exclusively released music under his own name. His breakthrough and notoriety came in 2006 when Nick Warren used the track "8 Bit Era" for his Global Underground: Paris compilation. As a result, Kleijn released his first artist album Naturally Artificial on Global Underground in 2007. He remixed artists such as John Legend, Goldfish, Dave Seaman, Way Out West, Hybrid, Sander Kleinenberg and Nadia Ali. In 2010, Kleijn released his second artist album Untold Stories through Manual Music.

As a DJ, Kleijn has played in many venues and festivals including Mystery Land, Extrema Outdoor, Dance Valley, Sensation, Warung Brazil, Privilege Ibiza, Moonpark Buenos Aires, Balaton Sound, and several Ultra Music Festivals around the globe.

Since 2010, Kleijn has composed music for animation, games, and advertisements.

He is a BBC Radio 1 'Next Hype' act for 'Stand Up', remixing John Legend and Hollywood soundtracker for Parker, Wrath Of The Titans, This Means War, and Ron Howard's Rush trailers. Throughout 2014 and 2015, Kleijn performed and produced 'Before.Now.After' in collaboration with Dutch DJs/producers and friends Olivier Weiter, Miss Melera, and Arjuna Schiks. Weiter and Kleijn also presented the weekly 'Before.Now.After' radio show at Slam!FM.

Kleijn released his bootleg for The Hunger Games song 'The Hanging Tree' by James Newton Howard. Having built a new studio in 2016, Kleijn spends much of his time creating new music leading up to the launch of his new imprint Days Like Nights.

== Discography ==
=== Studio albums ===
Title	Year	Label
Oscillations	2020	DAYS Like NIGHTS
Moments of Clarity	2018	DAYS Like NIGHTS
Untold Stories	2010	Manual Music
Naturally Artificial	2007	Global Underground

=== Mix albums ===
Album name	Year
Toolroom Live 02	2015
The Sound Of Outside The Box	2011
Club Pepper NYE 08	2008

=== Singles ===
Artist	Title	Label	Year
Eelke Klejin featuring Nathan Nicholson	Taking Flight	DAYS Like NIGHTS	2020
Eelke Klejin	Woodstock	DAYS Like NIGHTS	2020
Eelke Klejin	The Hierophant	DAYS Like NIGHTS	2020
Eelke Kleijn	Maschine EP	DAYS Like NIGHTS	2018
Eelke Kleijn	Drive	DAYS Like NIGHTS	2018
Eelke Kleijn	Moments of Clarity	DAYS Like NIGHTS	2018
Eelke Kleijn	Punta Cana	DAYS Like NIGHTS	2018
Eelke Kleijn	The Calling	DAYS Like NIGHTS	2018
Eelke Kleijn featuring Therese	Shed my Skin (Chill Out Mix)	DAYS Like NIGHTS	2018
Eelke Kleijn	The Method	Toolroom	2018
Eelke Kleijn	8 Bit Era (The Balearic Mix)	DAYS Like NIGHTS	2017
Eelke Kleijn	De Orde Van De Nacht	DAYS Like NIGHTS	2017
Eelke Kleijn featuring Therese	Shed my Skin	DAYS Like NIGHTS	2017
Eelke Kleijn	The Terminal	DAYS Like NIGHTS	2017
Eelke Kleijn	Rubicon	DAYS Like NIGHTS	2017
Eelke Kleijn	Home	DAYS Like NIGHTS	2017
Eelke Kleijn, Arjuna Schiks, Olivier Weiter, Miss Melera	Before.Now.After	Weiter	2015
Eelke Kleijn	Welcome to Orion	Terminal M	2015
Adrian Hour & Eelke Kleijn	Take Control	Toolroom	2015
Eelke Kleijn	In My Head	Spinnin' Deep	2015
Eelke Kleijn	Celebrate Life (Marten Fisher Vocal)	Spinnin' Deep	2015
Eelke Kleijn	Celebrate Life	Spinnin' Deep	2015
Eelke Kleijn	Oranje Liefde	Toolroom	2015
Eelke Kleijn	The Voices	Toolroom	2015
Eelke Kleijn	Space Disco	Toolroom	2015
Eelke Kleijn	Universal Soul	Toolroom	2015
Eelke Kleijn	Mistakes I've Made	Spinnin' Records	2014
Eelke Kleijn	51 Degrees Nord	Suara	2014
Eelke Kleijn	Vernietig	Suara	2014
Eelke Kleijn feat. Tres Or	Stand Up	Ultra Records	2014
Eelke Kleijn	Lovely Sweet Divine	Eskimo Recordings	2014
Eelke Kleijn	A Tale Of 2 Lovers	Eskimo Recordings	2014
Eelke Kleijn	Rampestamper	Lost & Found	2013
Eelke Kleijn	Kneiter	Parquet Recordings	2012
Eelke Kleijn	Ein Tag Am Strand (Instrumental)	Spinnin Records	2013
Eelke Kleijn	Onderhuids	Toolroom	2013
Eelke Kleijn	Eenvoud	Outside The Box Music	2013
Eelke Kleijn	Einzelgänger	White label	2012
Eelke Kleijn	Rauwdouwer	Sudbeat	2012
Eelke Kleijn	Kitten Of Mass Destruction / Eenvoud	Outside The Box Music	2012
Eelke Kleijn	Levensgenieter	Outside The Box Music	2011
Eelke Kleijn	Flierefluiter	Outside The Box Music	2011
Eelke Kleijn	Papillon	Outside The Box Music	2011
Eelke Kleijn	Doordrammer	Outside The Box Music	2011
Eelke Kleijn	Monkey Movin'	This Is	2011
Eelke Kleijn	Destroyer	This Is	2011
Eelke Kleijn	Kyoto	Outside The Box Music	2011
Eelke Kleijn	Arpeggiator Stories	Manual Music	2011
Eelke Kleijn	Insane In The Mainframe	Survival	2011
Eelke Kleijn & Sebastian Davidson	Army Of Two	Nightbird Music	2011
Eelke Kleijn & Sebastian Davidson	Breakfast 050	Nightbird Music	2011
Eelke Kleijn feat. Niels Geusebroek	Will I Love	Manual Music	2011
Eelke Kleijn	Body Language EP	Nervous	2010
Eelke Kleijn	Memoires/Music In My Pants	Anjunadeep	2010
Eelke Kleijn	Theme for Nosey	Manual Music	2010
Eelke Kleijn pres. The World	On the Edge (Sunday Morning Mix)	Flashover Recordings	2010
Eelke Kleijn	The Way That You Are	Outside the Box Music	2010
Eelke Kleijn	The Night Part 2	Proton	2010
Eelke Kleijn & Nick Hogendoorn	Luigi's Magic Mushroom Part 2	Global Underground	2009
Eelke Kleijn	Pretpakket	Baroque	2009
Eelke Kleijn	The Night	Proton	2009
Eelke Kleijn & Francesco Pico	Too Small Too Low / On the Fly	68 Recordings (Armada)	2009
Eelke Kleijn	Lost & Confused	Groovecollection Black	2008
Nick Hogendoorn & Eelke Kleijn	Fat Dragon	Outside the Box Music	2008
Eelke Kleijn pres: The World	On the Edge	Boom Tsjak	2008
Eelke Kleijn ft. Disco Damage	Slow Down	Deep	2008
Eelke Kleijn	Monsters of the Deep	Global Underground	2007
Nick Hogendoorn & Eelke Kleijn	Mr. Pick EP	Outside the Box Music	2007
Nick Hogendoorn & Eelke Kleijn	Walkabout EP	Ork Recordings	2007
Nick Hogendoorn & Eelke Kleijn	Where Are My Goggles	Baroque Limited	2007
Eelke Kleijn	8 Bit Era (Dub)	Global Underground	2007
Eelke Kleijn	8 Bit Era / Import Bride	Baroque Records	2006
C-Jay & Eelke Kleijn	Hinterglem (Deep Mix)	Plastik Park	2006
Nick Hogendoorn & Eelke Kleijn	Monkey Puzzle / Naked is Not OK	Outside the Box Music	2006
C-Jay & Eelke Kleijn	Daglicht	Plastik Park	2006
Eelke Kleijn	Deeper Depths / Knowledge Breaks	Segment	2005
Eelke Kleijn	4.5 Billion Years / Knowledge Base	Segment	2003

=== Remixes ===
Artist	Title	Label	Year
Laura Brenigan	Self Control (Eelke Kleijn vs Lee Cabrera)	DAYS like NIGHTS	2023
Aiwaska	Medicine (Eelke Kleijn Remix)	Exploited Ghetto	2020
Armin van Buuren	Blue Fear (Eelke Kleijn Day / Night Mix)	Armada Music	2020
Pendulum	9,000 Miles (Eelke Kleijn Remix)	Earstorm	2018
Pysh	Visions (Eelke Kleijn Remix)	Einmusika Recordings	2018
Amari & Nico Morano feat. Jinadu	Desire (Eelke Kleijn Remix)	DAYS like NIGHTS	2018
Shelter Point	Fuse (Eelke Kleijn Remix)	The Bearded Man	2017
Piek ft. Hokhok	Avalanche (Eelke Kleijn Remix)	Sincopat	2017
Jan Blomqvist	Drift feat. Aparde (Eelke Kleijn Remix)	Armada	2017
James Newton Howard feat. Jennifer Lawrence	The Hanging Tree (Eelke Kleijn Bootleg)	-	2016
Lifelike & Kris Menace	Discopolis 2.0 (Eelke Kleijn Remix)	Armada Music	2015
Yahel & Eyal Barkan	Voyage (Eelke Kleijn Remix)	SPRS	2015
Henry Saiz	Haunted Girl Canyon (Eelke Kleijn Remix)	Suara	2014
Benny Benassi feat. John Legend	Dance The Pain Away (Eelke Kleijn Remix)	Ultra	2014
Blamma! Blamma! feat. Kristina Train	Zsa Zsa (Eelke Kleijn Filtered House Remix)	Eskimo Recordings	2014
Chicco Secci & Fabio B	Crosses (Eelke Kleijn Remix)	d:vision	2014
Blamma! Blamma! feat. Kristina Train	Zsa Zsa (Eelke Kleijn Remix)	Eskimo Recordings	2014
Solee	Sommerliebe (Eelke Kleijn Remix)	Parquet Recordings	2013
Louis Kolben	Don't Loose Your Way (Eelke Kleijn Remix)	Outside The Box Music	2013
Bonnici, Chable	Ride (Olivier Weiter & Eelke Kleijn Remix)	Pilot 6 Recordings	2013
Navar	Fragma (Eelke Kleijn Remix)	Outside The Box Music	2013
Louis Kolben	Don't Lose Your Way (Eelke Kleijn Get Lost Re-edit)	Outside The Box Music	2013
Terje Saether	The Train feat. Malin Pettersen (Eelke Kleijn 'Midnight Express' Mix)	Hope Recordings	2012
Goldfish	Woman's A Devil (Eelke Kleijn Remix)	EMI Holland	2012
Dave Seaman & John 00 Fleming	Pixelated (Eelke Kleijn Remix)	Outside The Box Music	2012
Papercut	He Loves Me, She Loves Me Not (Eelke Kleijn Remix)	The Sound Of Evi	2011
Hartmutt Kiss	Water Games (Eelke Kleijn's Vintage Remix)	Definition Records	2011
Evren Ulusoy	Nightflowers (Eelke Kleijn Remix)	Outside The Box Music	2011
Terry Grant	A Moth On The Windowpane (Eelke Kleijn Remix)	Night Drive Music	2011
Dave Shtorn	Magic Moments (Eelke Kleijn Magical Dub Ride Remix)	Indigo Records	2011
Weepee	Overlay (Eelke Kleijn Remix)	Movement Records	2011
Dibby Dougherty & David Young	Not Trippin feat. Polarsets (Eelke Kleijn Remix)	Baroque Records	2011
Body Temp	Kalm (Eelke Kleijn Remix)	Silk Textures	2011
Markus Schulz	Not the Same (Eelke Kleijn Remix)	Global DJ Broadcast	2011
Ilya Malyuev	Art Nouveau (Eelke Kleijn Groove The Nouveau remix)	Nueva Digital	2011
Nadia Ali	People (Eelke Kleijn People Of The Sun Radio Edit)	Smile In Bed	2010
Kino Oko	Lovely Serenade (Eelke Kleijn Remix)	Tribal Vision	2010
Anauel	Waves Through the city (Eelke Kleijn Remix)	Kindred Sounds	2010
Jorg Murcus	Jouissance (Eelke Kleijn Remix)	Outside the Box Music	2010
DAVI	Blue Hour (Eelke Kleijn Space Mix)	Outside the Box Music	2010
Hybrid	Can You Hear Me (Eelke Kleijn Remix)	Distinctive	2010
Way Out West	Surrender (Eelke Kleijn Remix)	Hope / Armada	2010
Andy Moor	No More (Eelke Kleijn Remix)	Baroque	2010
Sander Kleinenberg	My Lexicon (Eelke Kleijn Remix)	Little Mountain Recordings	2010
Glen McArdle	Home At Last (Eelke Kleijn Edit)	Outside the Box Music	2009
Francesco Pico	See What We Can Find (Eelke Kleijn Remix)	Outside the Box Music	2009
Couture ft. Rachelle	Afterglow (Eelke Kleijn Remix)	Audio Therapy	2009
The Quasar & The Pressure	Take Me Over (Eelke Kleijn Remix)	Ready Mix Records	2009
Russian Linesman	Amsterdam Story (Eelke Kleijn Remix)	Manual Music	2009
Yvel & Tristan ft. Chriss of The Quasar	Panama (Eelke Kleijn Remix)	Ready Mix Records	2009
Steve Mill	Nothing Comes to Mind (Eelke Kleijn One Giant's Leap Remix)	System	2008
Kosmas Epsilon	Cubabe (Eelke Kleijn Remix)	Epsilon Trax	2008
Raisani and Borgesius	Nudity and Phlegm (Eelke Kleijn Remix)	Ready Mix Records	2008
Stan Kolev	Flashback (Eelke Kleijn Remix)	Ready Mix Records	2008
Sebastian Davidson	Bondi, I Do (Eelke Kleijn Remix)	Kinky Vinyl	2007
Oliver Moldan	Vendetta (Eelke Kleijn Remix)	Groovecollection Black	2007
Talisman & Hudson	Leaving Planet Earth (Eelke Kleijn Remix)	Global Underground	2007
Kosmas Epsilon	Paranoid (Eelke Kleijn Remix)	Groovecollection Black	2007
Jeff Bennet	Front Spiral (Nick Hogendoorn & Eelke Kleijn Remix)	Kindred Sounds	2007
Junk Science	Troll (Eelke Kleijn Remix)	Pangea	2007
Cerf, Mitiska & Jaren	Light the Skies (Eelke Kleijn Remix)	Baroque Records	2007
The Last Atlant	Potentialities (Eelke Kleijn Remix)	Toes in The Sand	2006
Episodic	Nothing This Day (Eelke Kleijn Remix)	Lost Language	2006
Earth Deuley	Peddlefeet (Nick Hogendoorn & Eelke Kleijn Remix)	Arabica Recordings	2006
Madoka	Thursday Night Hero (Eelke Kleijn Friday Morning Hangover Remix)	Noctambula	2006
C-Jay	Chemical Illusion (Eelke Kleijn Drum Edit)	Climax	2006
Serge Devant	Always Have Tomorrow (Eelke Kleijn Remix)	Lost Language	2005
