= Burned with Desire =

2003 song by Armin van Buuren

"Burned With Desire"

Single by Armin van Buuren featuring Justine Suissa

from the album 76
- Released: November 2003 (US); 8 March 2004 (Netherlands)
- Genre: Vocal trance
- Length: 3:01 (Rising Star Edit); 8:37 (Rising Star Vocal Mix); 5:53 (Album Version)
- Label: United; Ultra
- Songwriters: Armin van Buuren; Justine Suissa
- Producer: Armin van Buuren

Armin van Buuren singles chronology
"Sunburn (Walk Through the Fire)" (2003)	"Burned With Desire" (2003)	"Blue Fear 2004" (2004)

Alternative cover
- UK cover

Alternative cover
- US cover

"Burned With Desire" is a song by Dutch disc jockey and producer Armin van Buuren. It features vocals from British singer and songwriter Justine Suissa. It was released as 12" vinyl and CD single in the US in November 2003 by Ultra Records and in the Netherlands on 18 March 2004 by United Recordings. It is the fourth single from van Buuren's first studio album, 76.

== Background and release ==
"Burned with Desire" was recorded for van Buuren's debut studio album 76, on which it appears as the fourth track. On MusicBrainz, the album release entry credits van Buuren as the track's engineer, producer and composer, while Justine Suissa is credited for guest lead vocals and lyrics. Van Buuren's official discography lists the song among the tracks on 76 and describes the album as being closely connected to the trance scene of the period.

The single was issued in several formats and territories. MusicBrainz lists official versions including a 24-track digital release dated 1 November 2003, a United States 12-inch single through Ultra Records, United Kingdom CD and 12-inch releases through Nebula Records, and German 12-inch editions through Euphonic Records. A streaming edition on Apple Music is listed as a 15-track release dated 1 November 2003 and issued by Armada Music.

== Critical review ==
Maria Clinton from EDM Identity declares the song "Sounds super depressing but this is what I love most about a great vocal anthem. It gets people feeling something. Good or bad. It doesn’t matter. Magic begins to sweep across the dance floor when the sound of Justine Suissa’s voice floats effortlessly through the airwaves."

== Music video ==
A music video to accompany the release of "Burned With Desire" was released in 2004. It shows dancers in front of van Buuren performing the song.

== Legacy ==
In a 2019 retrospective for EDM Identity, Maria Clinton described "Burned with Desire" as one of van Buuren's most emotional trance tracks and highlighted Suissa's vocals and the song's theme of unrequited love.

== Remixes ==
An LTN remix of the song, titled "Burned with Desire (LTN Sunrise Remix)", was released through Armind in 2016 under catalogue number ARMD1302.

== Track listing ==
US – 12" – Ultra (UL1189-6)

1. "Burned With Desire" (Rising Star Remix) – 8:37
2. "Burned With Desire" (Rising Star Dub) – 7:51
3. "Burned With Desire" (Album Version) – 5:50

US – CD single – Ultra

1. "Burned With Desire" (Rising Star Edit) – 3:30
2. "Burned With Desire" (Rising Star Remix) – 8:35
3. "Burned With Desire" (Ronski Speed Remix) – 9:21

Netherlands – CD single – United (UTD3017)

1. "Burned With Desire" (Rising Star Edit) – 2:59
2. "Burned With Desire" (Rising Star Vocal Mix) – 8:35

UK – 12" single – Nebula (NEBT055)

1. "Burned With Desire" (Rising Star Vocal Mix) – 8:35
2. "Burned With Desire" (Riley & Durrant Vocal Mix) – 9:53

UK – CD single – Nebula (NEBCDX055)

1. "Burned With Desire" (Rising Star Radio Edit) – 3:01
2. "Burned With Desire" (Riley & Durrant Radio Edit) – 3:36

UK – Digital download / CD Single – Nebula (NEBT055/NEBCD055

1. "Burned With Desire" (Rising Star Edit) – 3:01
2. "Burned With Desire" (Rising Star Vocal Mix) – 8:37
3. "Burned With Desire" (Rising Star Dub Mix) – 7:53
4. "Burned With Desire" (Riley & Durrant Vocal Remix) – 9:53
5. "Burned With Desire" (Ronski Speed Dub Mix) – 6:58

Dub Mixes – UK – 12" – Nebula (NEBTX055)

1. "Burned With Desire" (Rising Star Dub Mix) – 6:58
2. "Burned With Desire" (Riley & Durrant Dub Mix) – 9:01

US – Digital download – Ultra (UL1189)

1. "Burned With Desire" (Radio Edit) – 3:28
2. "Burned With Desire" (UK Radio Edit) – 3:01
3. "Burned With Desire" (Album Version) – 5:56
4. "Burned With Desire" (Rising Star Radio Edit) – 3:28
5. "Burned With Desire" (Rising Star Remix) – 8:36
6. "Burned With Desire" (Rising Star Dub) – 7:52
7. "Burned With Desire" (Ronski Speed Radio Edit) – 3:51
8. "Burned With Desire" (Ronski Speed Remix) – 9:21
9. "Burned With Desire" (Ronski Speed Short Dub) – 5:55
10. "Burned With Desire" (Ronski Speed Dub) – 6:55
11. "Burned With Desire" (Riley & Durrant Vocal Remix) – 9:56
12. "Burned With Desire" (Riley & Durrant Dub) – 9:01
13. "Burned With Desire" (Kyau vs. Albert Remix) – 7:41
14. "Burned With Desire" (Brian Cross Remix) – 5:31
15. "Burned With Desire" (Chill Out Mix) – 7:02

LTN Sunrise Remix – Netherlands – Digital download – Armind (ARMD1302)

1. "Burned With Desire" (LTN Extended Sunrise Remix) – 4:48

== Charts ==
Chart (2004)	Peak position
Belgium (Ultratip Bubbling Under Flanders)	4
Netherlands (Dutch Top 40)	11
Netherlands (Single Top 100)	53
Finland (Suomen virallinen lista)	12
UK Singles (OCC)	45
UK Physical Singles (OCC)	45
UK Dance (OCC)	3
US Dance/Mix Show Airplay (Billboard)	6

== Chase Masterson version ==
"Burned With Desire"

Single by Chase Masterson
- Released: October 17, 2012
- Genre: Pop
- Length: 4:29
- Label: Helicon Arts Cooperative
- Songwriters: Armin van Buuren; Justine Suissa
- Producer: Kristopher Carter

Chase Masterson singles chronology
"Yesterday Was a Lie" (2011)	"Burned With Desire" (2012)

American actress and singer Chase Masterson performed a cover of "Burned With Desire" for an early cut of the motion picture Yesterday Was a Lie, but the song was not included in the commercial release of the film. Masterson's recording was released as a single on 17 October 2012.

=== Critical review ===
Rory L. Aronsky of Film Threat praised the recording, saying it "propels Masterson's voice from sultry chanteuse to haunting spirit. Besides her voice, Masterson is also blessed with lyrics that actually mean something, about human desire and how sometimes it can be painfully unreciprocated. It's a song with endless repeat value."
