= Justine Suissa =

- Born: Justine Suissa
- Origin: London, England
- Genres: Vocal trance
- Occupations: Singer, songwriter
- Years active: 2000–present
- Member of: OceanLab

Justine Suissa is a British singer-songwriter, the vocalist of trance group OceanLab.

== Career and collaborations ==
She has collaborated with Armin van Buuren, Markus Schulz and Robbie Rivera, and has continued to work with Above & Beyond outside of OceanLab, accompanying them on their 2016 world tour and participating on four songs on the band's 2018 album Common Ground. Three songs "Cold Feet", "Naked" and the album's lead single "Alright Now"

Justine initially came to wider notice when she featured on the hit Chicane album Behind The Sun in 2000. She formed OceanLab with Above & Beyond, achieving a top-twenty UK hit with "Satellite" in 2003. She also collaborated on a major dance hit, "Burned With Desire", with Armin van Buuren in 2003.

She has been called "[one] of the electronic world's most powerful vocalists" and "a mainstay in the trance world".

== Discography ==
=== Studio albums ===
==== as OceanLab ====
| Title | Details |
|---|---|
| Sirens of the Sea | Released: 21 July 2008; Format: CD, digital download, Vinyl; Label: Anjunabeats |
| Sirens of the Sea: Remixed | Released: 8 June 2009; Format: CD, digital download; Label: Anjunabeats |

=== Singles ===
==== As lead artist ====
List of singles
| Song | Year | Album |
|---|---|---|
| "Missing" (with Unclubbed) | 2009 | Unclubbed |
| "Sundeath" (with Mark Revell) | 2010 | Non-album singles |
| "Almost Home" (with Above & Beyond) | 2021 | Non-album singles |

===== As OceanLab =====
List of singles
| Song | Year | Album |
|---|---|---|
| "Clear Blue Water" | 2001 | Non-album single |
| "Satellite" | 2003 | Non-album single |
| "Sky Falls Down" | 2003 | Non-album single |
| "Beautiful Together" | 2003 | Non-album single |
| "Sirens of the Sea" | 2008 | Sirens of the Sea |
| "Miracle" | 2008 | Sirens of the Sea |
| "Breaking Ties" | 2008 | Sirens of the Sea |
| "On A Good Day" | 2009 | Sirens of the Sea |
| "Lonely Girl" | 2009 | Sirens of the Sea |
| "If I Could Fly on the Surface" (vs. Mike Shiver) | 2010 | Non-album single |
| "On A Good Day (Metropolis)" (with Gareth Emery) | 2010 | Non-album single |
| "Satellite" (re-release) | 2015 | Non-album single |
| "Another Chance" | 2016 | Non-album single |

===== As Keylime =====
List of singles
| Song | Year | Album |
|---|---|---|
| "Girlfriend" | 2003 | Non-album single |
| "Float Away" | 2006 | Non-album single |

==== As featured artist ====
List of singles
| Song | Year | Album |
|---|---|---|
| "Autumn Tactics" (Chicane featuring Justine Suissa) | 2000 | Behind the Sun |
| "One More Step To Heaven" (Silvester featuring Justine Suissa) | 2003 | Non-album single |
| "Burned With Desire" (Armin van Buuren featuring Justine Suissa) | 2003 | 76 |
| "Out There (5th Dimension)" (Masters & Nickson featuring Justine Suissa) | 2003 | Non-album single |
| "Somewhere (Clear Blue)" (Elevation featuring Justine Suissa) | 2004 | Non-album single |
| "Perception" (Markus Schulz featuring Justine Suissa) | 2010 | Do You Dream? |
| "Phoenix From The Flames" (Boom Jinx featuring Justine Suissa) | 2011 | Non-album single |
| "Half The Man" (Boom Jinx featuring Justine Suissa) | 2015 | Non-album single |
| "Alright Now" (Above & Beyond featuring Justine Suissa) | 2017 | Common Ground |

=== Guest appearances ===
List of singles
| Song | Year | Artist(s) | Album |
|---|---|---|---|
| "Never Wanted This" (featuring Justine Suissa) | 2003 | Armin van Buuren | 76 |
| "Wall of Sound" (featuring Justine Suissa) | 2005 | Armin van Buuren | Shivers |
| "Simple Things" (featuring Justine Suissa) | 2005 | Armin van Buuren | Shivers |
| "Little Something" (featuring Justine Suissa) | 2015 | Above & Beyond | We Are All We Need |
| "Naked" (featuring Justine Suissa) | 2018 | Above & Beyond | Common Ground |
| "Cold Feet" (featuring Justine Suissa) | 2018 | Above & Beyond | Common Ground |
| "Almost Home" (featuring Justine Suissa) | 2021 | Above & Beyond | |

=== Songwriting and Production credits ===
| Title | Year | Artist(s) | Album | Credits | Written with | Produced with |
|---|---|---|---|---|---|---|
| "Sun & Moon" (featuring Richard Bedford) | 2011 | Above & Beyond | Group Therapy | Co-writer | Jonathan "Jono" Grant, Tony McGuinness, Paavo Siljamaki, Sorcha Shepherd | – |
| "Bittersweet & Blue" (featuring Richard Bedford) | 2018 | Above & Beyond | Common Ground | Co-writer/Producer | Jonathan "Jono" Grant, Tony McGuinness, Paavo Siljamaki | Above & Beyond, Andrew Bayer |
