= List of vocal trance artists =

This is a list of vocal trance music artists and vocalists.

== Artists ==
- 4 Strings
- Above & Beyond
- Airbase
- Alice Deejay
- Aly & Fila
- Andy Moor
- Armin Van Buuren
- Ashley Wallbridge
- Astroline
- ATB
- Binary Finary
- Blank & Jones
- Bryan Kearney
- BT
- Cascada
- Chicane
- Cosmic Gate
- Darren Tate
- Tomcraft
- Dash Berlin
- Dee Dee
- Delerium
- Denis Kenzo
- DHT
- DJ Encore
- DJ Sammy
- DT8 Project
- Edward Maya
- Elucidate
- Example
- Faithless
- Ferry Corsten
- Filo & Peri
- Flip & Fill
- Fragma
- Gabriel & Dresden
- Gareth Emery
- Giuseppe Ottaviani
- Gouryella
- Ian Van Dahl
- Infernal
- Jam & Spoon
- JES
- Jessy De Smet
- John O'Callaghan
- Judge Jules
- Kate Ryan
- Kelly Llorenna
- Kyau & Albert
- Lasgo
- Lost Witness
- Markus Schulz
- Mauro Picotto
- Mayumi Morinaga
- Milk Inc.
- Move
- N-Trance
- OceanLab
- Paul Oakenfold
- Paul Van Dyk
- Paul Vinitsky
- PPK
- Protoculture
- RAM
- Robert Miles
- Roger Shah
- Ronski Speed
- Sander Van Doorn
- Sasha
- Sophie Sugar
- Sean Tyas
- Sebastian Brandt
- Super8 & Tab
- Sylver
- The Space Brothers
- Tiësto
- Tritonal
- (We Are) Nexus

== Vocalists ==
- Alexandra Prince
- Andrea Britton
- Anita Kelsey
- Annemie Coenen
- Aruna
- Audrey Gallagher
- Basshunter
- Betsie Larkin
- Bo Bruce
- Cara Dillon
- Christian Burns
- Chris Jones
- Christina Novelli
- Damae Klein
- Dhany
- Ellie Lawson
- Emma Hewitt
- Evi Goffin
- Gaia
- Haliene
- Jan Burton
- Jan Johnston
- Jaren Cerf
- Jes Brieden
- Jessica Wahls
- Jeza
- Jonathan Mendelsohn
- Judith Pronk
- Justine Suissa
- Kelly Llorenna
- Kirsty Hawkshaw
- Kristy Thirsk
- Linda Mertens
- Linney
- Lucy Saunders
- Mavie Marcos
- Medina
- Nadia Ali
- Natalie Gioia
- Natalie Horler
- Plumb (singer)
- Richard Bedford
- Roberta Carter-Harrison
- Roxanne Emery
- Samantha James
- Sarah Howells
- Sharon Den Adel
- Silvy De Bie
- Susana
- Tiff Lacey
- Tina Cousins
- Verena Rehm
- Xan Tyler
- Yuri
- Zoe Johnston
