= A State of Trance 2007 =

Compilation album by Armin van Buuren
- Released: 1 May 2007
- Recorded: 2007
- Genres: Uplifting trance; progressive trance; progressive house
- Labels: Armada; Ultra
- Producer: Armin van Buuren

Armin van Buuren chronology
10 Years (2006)	A State of Trance 2007 (2007)	Universal Religion Chapter 3 (2007)

Singles from A State of Trance 2007
- 1. "Rush Hour" Released: 25 June 2007

A State of Trance 2007 is the fourth compilation album in the A State of Trance compilation series mixed and compiled by Dutch DJ and record producer Armin van Buuren. The two-disc album was released on 1 May 2007 by Armada Music and Ultra Records.

== Track listing ==
Disc one: On the Beach
No.	Title	Writer(s)	Artist	Length
1.	"Light The Skies" (Retrobyte's Classic Electrobounce Mix)	Matthew Cerf; Shawn Mitiska; Jaren Cerf	Cerf, Mitiska & Jaren	6:08
2.	"Carry Me Away"	Chris Lake	Chris Lake featuring Emma Hewitt	6:15
3.	"Together We Rise"	Ossama Al Sarraf; Ned Shepard	Sultan & Ned	6:00
4.	"Who Will Find Me"	Roger-Pierre Shah; Adrina Thorpe	DJ Shah featuring Adrina Thorpe	9:15
5.	"Reasons To Forgive"	Kirsty Hawkshaw; Joven Grech; Cyprian Cassar	Kirsty Hawkshaw Meets Tenishia	7:00
6.	"The Distance"	Mark Otten	Rio Addicts	5:21
7.	"Wouldn't Change A Thing"	Roberto Longiarù; Jennifer Rene	Jose Amnesia featuring Jennifer Rene	5:17
8.	"In & Out" (DJ Shah Rework)	Roger-Pierre Shah; Alexander Perls	Sunlounger	7:02
9.	"Touch The Sun" (Rank 1 Remix)	Fabio Carrara; Nadia Bonifacio; Oscar Cossali; Alessandro Po; Alessandro Talia	Alex Bartlett featuring Anthya	4:20
10.	"Kalopsia"	Tore Vatle Jensen	The Blizzard	6:19
11.	"Always A Fool"	Ralph Kyau; Steven Moebuis Albert	Kyau & Albert	6:12
12.	"Tremble"	Freek Geuze; Johan Vermeulen	Global Illumination	6:52
Total length:				76:03

Disc two: In the Club
No.	Title	Writer(s)	Artist	Length
1.	"Miserere"	Armin van Buuren	Armin van Buuren	2:20
2.	"Rush Hour"	Armin van Buuren	Armin van Buuren	7:49
3.	"Walk Away"	Mark Sinclair; Mark Sherry	Terry Ferminal vs. Mark Sherry	4:14
4.	"Formentera What" (Gareth Emery Remix)	Albert Candiani	Albert Vorne	4:35
5.	"Ascent"	Michael Dow	Michael Dow	4:53
6.	"Perspective"	Boy Hagemann	Rex Mundi	4:13
7.	"The Space We Are" (Acapella)	Ronny Neumann; Adrian Broekhuyse; Ralf Müller; Raz Nitzan	Ronski Speed featuring Sir Adrian	2:36
8.	"I Am"	Markus Schulz; Stephen Jones; Ricky Simmonds	Markus Schulz vs. Chakra	5:47
9.	"Evergreen"	Ralph Barendse; Sander van der Waal	First State	7:08
10.	"Firefly"	Michael Foyle	Mike Foyle	4:10
11.	"What You Need" (Hard Dub)	Claus Terhoeven; Ned Bigham; Richard Walters	Nic Chagall	4:52
12.	"Anthem"	Eric Lumiere	Filo & Peri featuring Eric Lumiere	4:02
13.	"Whatever" (Aly & Fila Remix)	Simon Paul; Miguel Sassot	Lost Witness vs. Sassot	3:58
14.	"Why"	Frode Kambo Nilsen	FKN featuring Jahala	5:07
15.	"Day Seven"	Sophie Forsyth	Sophie Sugar	3:13
16.	"One More Light Out"	Sean Tyas	Sean Tyas Presents Logistic	6:09
Total length:				75:09

== Charts ==
Chart (2007)	Peak position
Dutch Albums (Album Top 100)	5
Mexican Albums (Top 100 Mexico)	54
US Top Dance Albums (Billboard)	9
