= Universal Religion Chapter 3 =

Compilation album by Armin van Buuren
- Released: 8 October 2007
- Genres: Trance; progressive trance; progressive house
- Label: Armada

Armin van Buuren chronology
A State of Trance 2007 (2007)	Universal Religion Chapter 3 (2007)	Imagine (2008)

Singles from Universal Religion Chapter 3
- 1. "If You Should Go" Released: 21 February 2008

Universal Religion Chapter 3, also known as Universal Religion 2008 - Live From Armada At Ibiza, is the third compilation album in the Universal Religion compilation series mixed and compiled by Dutch DJ and record producer Armin van Buuren. It was released on 8 October 2007 by Armada Music.

The digital download version was released on 12 December 2007 on iTunes and contains edits of the individual songs listed, as well as the full continuous mix.

== Track listing ==
No.	Title	Artist	Length
1.	"Another Day on the Terrace"	Sunlounger	5:34
2.	"Till the Sky Falls Down (Dub)"	Dash Berlin	5:34
3.	"Invincible (Sied van Riel Remix)"	Jose Amnesia	6:06
4.	"Roadkill (EDX's Acapulco at Night Remix)"	Dubfire	4:35
5.	"Welsh Morphology"	David West	5:17
6.	"Daydream"	Markus Schulz vs. Andy Moor	6:15
7.	"Barent Blue (Marnix Presents Monogato Remix)"	Terk Dawn	5:07
8.	"How Long?"	Aly & Fila vs. FKN featuring Jahala	4:55
9.	"Summer Blush"	Mungo	5:33
10.	"Lifecycle"	Forerunners	4:23
11.	"Beauty Hides in the Deep (John O'Callaghan remix)"	The Doppler Effect	4:36
12.	"Big Sky"	John O'Callaghan featuring Audrey Gallagher	7:01
13.	"Resound"	Thomas Bronzwaer	5:59
14.	"If You Should Go"	Armin van Buuren featuring Susana	5:24
15.	"Quicksand"	Bissen	5:03
16.	"Space Perspective (Markus Schulz mash-up)"	Rex Mundi and Ronski Speed	8:27
Total length:			01:30:32

== Charts ==
Chart (2007)	Peak position
Dutch Albums (Album Top 100)	10
Mexican Albums (Top 100 Mexico)	17
US Top Dance Albums (Billboard)	4
