= Armin van Buuren: In the Mix =

2010 video game

- Developer(s): TransGaming Technologies
- Publisher(s): Foreign Media Games
- Platform(s): Wii
- Release: PAL: 12 November 2010
- Genre(s): Music video game
- Mode(s): Single-player

Armin van Buuren: In The Mix is a music video game for the Wii console. It was announced in May 2009 and was developed by TransGaming Technologies of Canada and published by Foreign Media Games (now Easy Interactive). The game was released in the United Kingdom on 12 November 2010.

== Tracklist ==
- The Return – 8 Wonders
- Fine Without You (Original mix) – Armin van Buuren
- Going Wrong – Armin van Buuren
- Sail – Armin van Buuren
- Serenity – Armin van Buuren
- Zocalo (Zocalo in Mexico mix) – Armin van Buuren
- Communication – Armin van Buuren
- Imagine (Original mix) – Armin van Buuren
- Shivers (Alex M.O.R.P.H. Red Light Dub) – Armin van Buuren
- Rush Hour – Armin van Buuren
- Blue Fear (Original) – Armin van Buuren
- Love you More – Armin van Buuren
- Face To Face (Martin Roth remix) – Armin van Buuren
- If You Should Go (Aly & Fila remix) – Armin van Buuren
- Intruder – Armin van Buuren
- Intricacy (Thomas Bronzwaer remix) – Armin van Buuren
- Gaia – Tuvan
- Hold on To Me (John O'Callaghan remix) – Armin van Buuren feat. Audrey Gallagher
- Rain (Cosmic Gate remix) – Armin feat. Cathy Burton
- Never Say Never (Original mix) – Armin feat. Jacqueline Govaert
- Unforgivable (First State Smooth mix) – Armin feat. Jaren
- Fine Without You (Sied van Riel remix) – Armin feat. Jennifer Rene
- Burned With Desire (Rising Star mix) – Armin feat. Justine Suissa
- In And Out of Love (Richard Durand remix) – Armin feat. Sharon den Adel
- What If (Ohmna remix) – Armin feat. Vera Ostrova
- Dust in the Wind – Arnej
- Strangers we've become (Vocal mix) (Armada) – Arnej feat. Josie
- Washout – Bissen ft Crossover
- Hosoi (Simon & Shaker remix) – Blake Jarrell pres. Trasher
- You Never Said (Dash Berlin remix) – Cerf, Mitiska & Jaren
- Chinook – Dakota
- Man on the Run (Dash Berlin 4am mix) – Dash Berlin with Cerf, Mitiska & Jaren
- Love Always Fades (Michael De Kooker remix) – Dave Graham feat. Cat Martin
- Verano (Fast Distance mix) – DJ Shah & Fast Distance pres. Samara
- Biscayne – Elevation
- Copius Cain (Genix Re-Reub) – Genix
- Lover Summer (Orjan Nilsen remix) – Ilya Soloviev & Paul Miller
- Pyramid – John O Callaghan pres. Mannix
- New Jersey – Joint Operations Centre
- Fade 2 Black (W&W remix) – M6
- Mr. White – Marcos Schossow
- The New World (Original mix) – Markus Schulz
- Bittersweet Nightshade – Mike Foyle
- Vampire (Gareth Emery remix) – Myon & Shane 54 feat. Carrie Skipper
- The Sound of Goodbye – Perpetuous Dreamer
- Dust.Wav – Perpetuous Dreamer
- Back to the Essence (Ruben De Ronde remix) – Push
- Nothing at All – Rex Mundi & Susana
- Touch Me (Original Vocal mix) – Rising Star
- Stringer – Riva
- Body Lotion (Jorn van Deynhoven remix) – Roger Shah pres. Savannah
- Distant Signature (Alternate mix) – Signum
- Janeiro (Armin van Buuren remix) – Solid Sessions
- Lost – Sunlounger featuring Zara
- Beauty Hides in the Deep (The Blizzard remix) – The Doppler Effect
- Beyond The Stars – Thomas Bronzwaer
- Unexpectation (Denga & Manus remix) – Vengeance
- Carte Blanche – Veracocha
- Flowtation – Vincent de Moor
- Fly Away (Cosmic Gate remix) – Vincent de Moor
- Arena – W&W
