= Chris Jones (British singer) =

British singer (born 1985)

- Born: Christopher Anthony Jones; April 20, 1985 (age 41)
- Origin: United Kingdom
- Genres: EDM, trance, rock, acoustic
- Years active: 2002–present
- Member of: Neverlanded
- Formerly of: The Benz

Christopher Anthony Jones (born 20 April 1985) is an English singer and songwriter best known for featuring the vocals and lyrics on "Going Wrong" (2008), written and produced by Dutch trance DJ and producer Armin van Buuren plus German trance DJ and producer Roger Shah. This track was present in the Dutch charts for nine successive weeks and has been viewed more than 19,000,000 times on YouTube.

== Career ==
Jones has a love and passion for music that has developed from childhood, songwriting, singing and performing from a young age. When he was about 13/14, he started acting in plays at school. This culminated in an appearance in British Channel 4 soap Hollyoaks. Jones appeared in one episode as a young bully called Toadface. Coming from a rock background, Jones decided upon acoustic rock as his platform, and began working with a number of talented and well respected producers. Through these projects, Jones started to develop his writing skills, began creating songs, and matured quickly as a solo artist.

=== The Benz ===
When he was 17, he formed a band with school friends. They started playing in their bedrooms or any other spaces they could find. After six months or so, they thought they were ready for their first gig. In the meantime, Jones was coached by Stevie Lange. They gradually got better and got booked all over the UK. But as with most things, situations and circumstances change, and they called it a day in 2006.

=== Dance music ===
Roger Shah put Jones into dance music. He contacted him on MySpace because he was intrigued by his voice, and after a few conversations back and forth, the foundations of the hit "Going Wrong" was born. Jones had always been into rock, but since he has been working with Armin and Roger, He has learned to love the trance scene. After the track was finished, "Going Wrong" was scheduled to be released on Rogers' Songbook, yet this was just the beginning of their new friendship and working relationship.

Armin van Buuren, was presented with the track by Roger, Armin had his own plans in mind for this vocalist, and was set to appear on Armin's album Imagine on Armada Music.

On 19 April 2008, Jones and Shah performed "Going Wrong" live with Armin at Armin only in Utrecht, the Netherlands, in front of 20,000 fans.

This also began the "Imagine" tour for Jones, as he travelled the world with Armin and continued to perform live in Melbourne, Sydney, Romania, Poland, Belgium and the Americas.

Within Temptation engaged Jones to duet on their single "Utopia".

=== Neverlanded ===
After months on the Imagine world tour, Jones and the guitarist Eller van Buuren (brother of Armin) found a shared passion and winning connection for songwriting and performing. They formed the rock band, Neverlanded, whose debut EP called On Air was released on 1 October 2012. Their track "Bottle for a Friend" was entered in September 2012 for the Marshall Ultimate Band Contest competition.

== Discography ==
=== Singles ===
==== 2008 ====
- "Going Wrong" with Armin van Buuren and DJ Shah, on Armada Music

==== 2009 ====
- "To the Sky" with Roger Shah, on Armada Music
- "Utopia" with Within Temptation, on GUN Records

==== 2010 ====
- "Become One" with Ali Wilson, on in Charge Records

==== 2011 ====
- "Summer Days" and "Obsession" with Roger Shah, in the "openminded!?" album, on Armada Music

==== 2012 ====
- "Starting Right Now" with Cerf, Mitiska & Jaren, on S107 Recordings (Armada Music)
- "Memory of a Dream" with Tenishia, on Armada Music
- "Vital Signs" with Roy Malakian, on in Trance We Trust (the Eller van Buuren's acoustic version of this song is at the top of the music charts of radioone.fm)
- "When You Are Gone" with Arjonas and Morttagua, on Tiger Records
- "Reason" with Chris Schweizer, on Soundpiercing (Armada Music)

==== 2013 ====
- "Scream" feat. Kairo Kingdom on Big Fish Recordings
- "Running Out of Time" with Aly & Fila, on Future Sound of Egypt

==== 2014 ====
- "Share This Night" with Sied van Riel on Black Hole Recordings
- "So Lonely" with DJ Feel & Vadim Spark on Amsterdam Trance Records
- "Young Again" with Hardwell on Revealed Recordings

==== 2015 ====
- "Make it Ours" with Ferry Corsten on Flashover Recordings
- "Rising Sun" with Manse on Revealed Recordings

=== EPs ===
- 2012: Neverlanded's debut EP On Air
