= Unforgivable (song) =

2009 single by Armin van Buuren

Single by Armin van Buuren featuring Jaren

from the album Imagine
- Released: 12 January 2009
- Studio: Armada Studios, Amsterdam
- Genre: Progressive trance
- Length: 3:13 (radio edit); 8:13 (extended mix)
- Label: Armind; Armada; Ultra
- Songwriters: Armin van Buuren; Benno de Goeij; Jaren Cerf
- Producers: Armin van Buuren; Benno de Goeij

Armin van Buuren singles chronology
"In and Out of Love" (2008)	"Unforgivable" (2009)	"Fine Without You" (2009)

Jaren singles chronology
"Walk Away" (2008)	"Unforgivable" (2009)	"Surreal" (2009)

"Unforgivable" is a song by Dutch disc jockey and record producer Armin van Buuren. It features vocals and lyrics from American singer, songwriter and actress Jaren. The song was released in the Netherlands by Armind on 12 January 2009 as the third single from van Buuren's third studio album Imagine.

== Background and release ==
"Unforgivable" originally appeared on Armin van Buuren's third studio album Imagine, which was released in 2008. The album version features vocals by American singer-songwriter Jaren and guitar by Eller van Buuren. Van Buuren and Benno de Goeij produced the track, while van Buuren, de Goeij and Jaren Cerf are credited as its writers.

The single release followed in 2009 through Armind and Armada Music. Beatport lists the extended mix and First State remixes as released on 12 January 2009, while Armada's Bandcamp page lists a seven-track digital package released on 9 February 2009.

== Composition ==
"Unforgivable" is a vocal trance and progressive trance track built around Jaren's lead vocal performance. The extended mix runs for 8 minutes and 13 seconds and is listed by Beatport at 130 beats per minute in B minor. The First State Smooth Mix runs for 9 minutes and 21 seconds, and is listed at 132 beats per minute in B minor.

== Reception ==
The webmedia We Rave You considers that the song, 10 years after its release, is an "outstanding production". According to the media, van Buuren is "masterfully combining the melodic elements with the Jaren's spectacular vocal performance in a way which compliments [sic] it and allows it to stand out."

== Music video ==
A music video to accompany the release of "Unforgivable" was first released onto YouTube on 13 January 2009. The music video shows Jaren who plays a deceived woman, driving a car and crying. She reminds her best moments with her husband which she discovered he's unfaithful to her with another woman. At the side of the road, Armin van Buuren hitchhikes. Jaren decides to take him away. Thanks to him she success in forgetting her former husband.

== Track listing ==
- Netherlands – Armind – digital download (ARMD1061)
1. "Unforgivable" (extended mix) – 8:13
2. "Unforgivable" (First State rough mix) – 8:57
3. "Unforgivable" (First State smooth mix) – 9:21
4. "Unforgivable" (Stoneface & Terminal dub mix) – 7:24
5. "Unforgivable" (Stoneface & Terminal vocal mix) – 9:03
- Netherlands – Armind – 12" (ARMD1061)
1. "Unforgivable" (First State smooth mix) – 9:21
2. "Unforgivable" (Stoneface & Terminal dub mix) – 7:24
3. "Unforgivable" (original mix) – 8:13
- Netherlands / United States – Armada digital / Ultra – digital download (ARDI987)
1. "Unforgivable" (radio edit) – 3:13
2. "Unforgivable" (extended mix) – 8:13
3. "Unforgivable" (First State smooth mix) – 9:21
4. "Unforgivable" (First State rough mix) – 8:57
5. "Unforgivable" (Stoneface & Terminal vocal mix) – 9:03
6. "Unforgivable" (Stoneface & Terminal dub mix) – 7:24
7. "Unforgivable" (Cerf & Mitiska remix) – 9:30
- Netherlands – Armada – CD single (ARMA182)
1. "Unforgivable" (radio edit) – 3:13
2. "Unforgivable" (extended mix) – 8:13
3. "Unforgivable" (First State smooth mix) – 9:21
4. "Unforgivable" (First State rough mix) – 8:57
5. "Unforgivable" (Stoneface & Terminal vocal mix) – 9:03
6. "Unforgivable" (Stoneface & Terminal dub mix) – 7:24
- Belgium – Mostiko – CD single
1. "Unforgivable" (radio edit) – 3:13
2. "Unforgivable" (First State remix) – 7:02
- Poland – Sony – CD single
1. "Unforgivable" (radio edit) – 3:13
2. "Unforgivable" (extended mix) – 8:13
- Poland – Sony – CD single remixes
1. "Unforgivable" (First State rough mix) – 8:57
2. "Unforgivable" (First State smooth mix) – 9:21
3. "Unforgivable" (Stoneface & Terminal dub mix) – 7:24
4. "Unforgivable" (Stoneface & Terminal vocal mix) – 9:03

== Charts ==
Chart (2009)	Peak position
Belgium (Ultratop 50 Flanders)	41
Netherlands (Single Top 100)	62

== Release history ==
Release dates and formats for "Unforgivable"
Region	Date	Format	Label	Ref.
Netherlands	12 January 2009	Digital download	Armind / Armada Music	
Various	9 February 2009	Digital download	Armada Music	
