= Imagine (Armin van Buuren album) =

Studio album by Armin van Buuren
- Released: 18 April 2008
- Recorded: Late 2007 - Early 2008
- Genre: Trance
- Length: 78:54
- Labels: Armada; Ultra
- Producers: Armin van Buuren; Benno de Goeij; Adrian Broekhuyse; Raz Nitzan; Geert Huinink; Sean Tyas

Armin van Buuren chronology
Universal Religion Chapter 3 (2007)	Imagine (2008)	A State of Trance 2008 (2008)

Singles from Imagine
- 1. "Going Wrong" Released: 7 April 2008; 2. "In and Out of Love" Released: 6 August 2008; 3. "Unforgivable" Released: 12 January 2009; 4. "Fine Without You" Released: 25 May 2009; 5. "Never Say Never" Released: 29 June 2009

Professional ratings
Review scores
Source	Rating
365mag	7.5/10 stars
AllMusic	4/5 stars

Imagine is the third studio album by Dutch DJ and record producer Armin van Buuren. It was released on 18 April 2008 by Armada Music. The album entered the Dutch album chart at number one. In the US, it debuted at number 4 on the Billboard Dance/Electronic Albums chart.

The first single "Going Wrong" debuted on van Buuren's A State of Trance radio show. The single sees the collaboration of Armin van Buuren with DJ Shah and Chris Jones. On iTunes, "If You Should Go" was offered as a bonus track along with the Inpetto vs. Duderstadt version which was only up for pre-order. "In and Out of Love", which features Sharon den Adel from the band Within Temptation, became the second single from Imagine. Its video has been viewed over 375 million times on YouTube. The album also spawned three more singles: "Unforgivable" featuring Jaren, "Fine Without You", featuring Jennifer Rene, and "Never Say Never" featuring Jacqueline Govaert.

== Track listing ==
No.	Title	Writer(s)	Producer(s)	Length
1.	"Imagine"	Armin van Buuren, Eller van Buuren, Geert Huinink	van Buuren, Huinink	9:27
2.	"Going Wrong" (with DJ Shah featuring Chris Jones)	van Buuren, Roger P. Shah, Christopher Jones	van Buuren, Shah, Benno de Goeij	5:36
3.	"Unforgivable" (featuring Jaren)	van Buuren, de Goeij, Jaren Cerf	van Buuren, de Goeij	8:03
4.	"Face to Face"	van Buuren, de Goeij	van Buuren, de Goeij, Adrian Broekhuyse^{[a]}, Raz Nitzan^{[a]}	7:30
5.	"Hold on to Me" (featuring Audrey Gallagher)	van Buuren, de Goeij, Audrey Gallagher	van Buuren, de Goeij	7:16
6.	"In and Out of Love" (featuring Sharon den Adel)	van Buuren, de Goeij, Sharon den Adel	van Buuren, de Goeij	6:01
7.	"Never Say Never" (featuring Jacqueline Govaert)	van Buuren, de Goeij, Jacqueline Govaert	van Buuren, de Goeij	6:59
8.	"Rain" (featuring Cathy Burton)	van Buuren, de Goeij, Cathy Burton, Broekhuyse, Nitzan	van Buuren, de Goeij	7:10
9.	"What If" (featuring Vera Ostrova)	van Buuren, de Goeij, Vera Ostrova	van Buuren, de Goeij	7:18
10.	"Fine Without You" (featuring Jennifer Rene)	van Buuren, Jennifer Rene	van Buuren	6:26
11.	"Intricacy"	van Buuren, Sean Tyas	van Buuren, Sean Tyas	7:07

iTunes Store bonus tracks
No.	Title	Writer(s)	Producer(s)	Length
12.	"If You Should Go" (featuring Susana)	van Buuren, Broekhuyse, Nitzan	van Buuren, Broekhuyse^{[a]}, Nitzan^{[a]}	7:48
13.	"The Sound of Goodbye" (Simon & Shaker remix)	van Buuren, Broekhuyse, Nitzan	van Buuren, Broekhuyse, Nitzan	8:31

Notes

- ^{^[a]} signifies a vocal producer

== Charts ==
=== Weekly charts ===
Chart (2008)	Peak position
Dutch Albums (Album Top 100)	1
Mexican Albums (Top 100 Mexico)	39
Polish Albums (ZPAV)	32
US Billboard 200	157
US Top Dance Albums (Billboard)	5

=== Year-end charts ===
Chart (2008)	Position
Dutch Albums (Album Top 100)	72
