= Fine Without You =

2009 single by Armin van Buuren

Single by Armin van Buuren featuring Jennifer Rene

from the album Imagine
- Released: 25 May 2009
- Studio: Armada Studios, Amsterdam
- Genre: Vocal trance
- Length: 3:18 (radio edit); 6:39 (extended mix)
- Label: Armind; Armada; Ultra
- Songwriters: Armin van Buuren; Jennifer Rene Bermudez
- Producer: Armin van Buuren

Armin van Buuren singles chronology
"Unforgivable" (2009)	"Fine Without You" (2009)	"Never Say Never" (2009)

Jennifer Rene singles chronology
"Invicible" (2008)	"Fine Without You" (2009)	"Not the Same" (2011)

"Fine Without You" is a song by Dutch disc jockey and record producer Armin van Buuren. It features vocals and lyrics from American singer-songwriter and disc jockey Jennifer Rene. The song was released in the Netherlands by Armind on 25 May 2009 as the fourth single from van Buuren's third studio album Imagine.

== Background and release ==
"Fine Without You" originally appeared on Armin van Buuren's third studio album Imagine, where it was included as the album's tenth track. The song features vocals by American singer-songwriter Jennifer Rene, who also co-wrote the track with van Buuren. Van Buuren is credited with production and programming.

The single was released through Armind and Armada Music on 25 May 2009. The standard digital package contains the radio edit, extended mix and a remix by Sied van Riel. A digital release was also issued through Ultra Records, while a Dutch 12-inch vinyl release was issued by Armind on 8 June 2009.

== Composition ==
"Fine Without You" is a vocal trance track. The album version has a tempo of 134 beats per minute and features programming by van Buuren and vocals by Rene. The Sied van Riel remix is set at 133 beats per minute in E major.

== Music video ==
A music video to accompany the release of "Fine Without You" was first released onto YouTube on 27 August 2009. It features Rene and van Buuren and it was shot in Los Angeles Memorial Sports Arena.

== Track listing ==
- Netherlands / US – Armin / Ultra – digital download & CD (ARMD1063/UL2126)
1. "Fine Without You" (Radio Edit) – 3:18
2. "Fine Without You" (Extended Mix) – 6:39
3. "Fine Without You" (Sied van Riel Remix) – 7:43
- Netherlands – Armind – 12" (ARMD1063)
1. "Fine Without You" (Extended Mix) – 6:40
2. "Fine Without You" (Sied van Riel Remix) – 7:44

== Charts ==
Chart (2010)	Peak position
US Dance/Mix Show Airplay (Billboard)	25

== Release history ==
Release dates and formats for "Fine Without You"
Region	Date	Format	Label	Catalogue	Ref.
Worldwide	25 May 2009	Digital download	Armind / Armada Music	ARMD1063	
Worldwide	25 May 2009	Digital download	Ultra Records	UL 2126	
Netherlands	8 June 2009	12-inch vinyl	Armind	ARMD1063	
