= If You Should Go =

2008 single by Armin van Buuren

Single by Armin van Buuren featuring Susana

from the album Universal Religion Chapter 3 and Closer
- Released: 21 February 2008
- Studio: Armada Studios, Amsterdam
- Genre: Uplifting trance
- Length: 3:30 (radio edit); 7:46 (original mix)
- Label: Armind; Armada; Ultra
- Songwriters: Armin van Buuren; Adrian Broekhuyse; Raz Nitzan
- Producers: Armin van Buuren; Sir Adrian; Raz Nitzan

Armin van Buuren singles chronology
"Rush Hour" (2007)	"If You Should Go" (2008)	"Going Wrong" (2008)

Susana singles chronology
"Shivers" (2005)	"If You Should Go" (2008)	"Nothing At All" (2009)

"If You Should Go" is a song by Dutch disc jockey and record producer Armin van Buuren. It features vocals and lyrics from Dutch singer Susana. The song was released in the Netherlands by Armind on 21 April 2008 as the only single from van Buuren's compilation Universal Religion Chapter 3 and from Susana's album Closer. The song is included as a bonus track on the iTunes version of van Buuren's third studio album Imagine. It is the second collaboration between van Buuren and Susana after their hit "Shivers" in 2005.

== Background and release ==
"If You Should Go" was released as a collaboration between Armin van Buuren and Dutch singer Susana. It followed their 2005 collaboration "Shivers". Van Buuren's official website lists the single as an Armind release dated 3 March 2008 and gives the tracklist as the original mix, the Aly & Fila remix, the Inpetto vs Duderstadt remix and the John O'Callaghan vocal mix.

Apple Music lists a four-track edition dated 25 February 2008 and an eight-track edition dated 3 March 2008, both issued by Armada Music. The song also appeared as a bonus track on the digital edition of van Buuren's third studio album Imagine.

According to the website Trance History, following an "aggressive sound of uplifting trance", the song "anticipated the release of the album Imagine".

== Music video ==
A music video to accompany the release of "If You Should Go" was first released onto YouTube on 1 March 2010.

== Track listing ==
- Netherlands – Armind – Digital download long version (ARMD1050)
1. "If You Should Go" (Original Mix) – 7:46
2. "If You Should Go" (Aly & Fila Remix) – 9:06
3. "If You Should Go" (Aly & Fila Dub Mix) – 9:06
4. "If You Should Go" (Inpetto vs. Duderstadt Remix) - 7:54
5. "If You Should Go" (Inpetto vs. Duderstadt Instrumental Mix) - 7:54
6. "If You Should Go" (John O'Callaghan Remix) – 7:59
7. "If You Should Go" (John O'Callaghan Dub Mix) – 7:59
8. "If You Should Go" (John O'Callaghan Instrumental Mix) – 7:59
9. "If You Should Go" (Inpetto vs. Duderstadt Dub Mix) - 7:54
- Netherlands – Armind – Digital download short version (ARMD1050)
1. "If You Should Go" (Original Mix) – 7:46
2. "If You Should Go" (Aly & Fila Remix) – 9:06
3. "If You Should Go" (Inpetto vs. Duderstadt Remix) - 7:54
4. "If You Should Go" (John O'Callaghan Vocal Mix) – 7:59
- Netherlands – Armada – CD (ARMA125)
1. "If You Should Go" (Radio Edit) – 3:30
2. "If You Should Go" (Original Mix) – 7:46
- United States – Ultra – Inpetto vs. Duderstadt Dub Mix - digital download (UL1699)
1. "If You Should Go" (Inpetto vs. Duderstadt Dub Mix) - 7:54

== Other appearances ==
The Aly & Fila remix of "If You Should Go" was included on A State of Trance Year Mix 2008, where it appears as the opening track of the second disc. The song was also included on the digital edition of Imagine as "If You Should Go (Aly & Fila Remix)".

In 2021, Armada Music included the Aly & Fila and John O'Callaghan remixes of "If You Should Go" in its list of "The 100 Best Vocal Trance Classics (1997–2011)". The label described the song as van Buuren and Susana's follow-up collaboration after "Shivers" and highlighted the two remixes as uplifting trance versions of the single.

== Charts ==
Chart (2008)	Peak position
Russia (Tophit)	257
