= The Sound of Goodbye =

The Sound of Goodbye may refer to:

- The Sound of Goodbye (Crystal Gayle song), 1983
- The Sound of Goodbye (Perpetuous Dreamer song), 2001
- Sound of Goodbye, a song by Sugababes from Catfights and Spotlights
