= Rush Hour (Armin van Buuren composition) =

2007 single by Armin van Buuren

Single by Armin van Buuren

from the album A State of Trance 2007
- Released: 25 June 2007
- Studio: Armada Studios, Amsterdam
- Genre: Uplifting trance
- Length: 2:53 (radio edit); 9:34 (no intro edit)
- Label: Armind; Armada; Ultra
- Songwriter: Armin van Buuren
- Producer: Armin van Buuren

Armin van Buuren singles chronology
"Communication Part 3" (2007)	"Rush Hour" (2007)	"If You Should Go" (2008)

"Rush Hour" is an instrumental composition by Dutch DJ and producer Armin van Buuren. The song was released in the Netherlands by Armind on 25 June 2007 as the only single from van Buuren's compilation A State of Trance 2007. It was the official anthem of 2007 UEFA European Under-21 Championship in the Netherlands. Another version of the track starts with an introduction called "Miserere".

== Background and release ==
"Rush Hour" was released as a single by Armin van Buuren in 2007. Van Buuren's official website lists the release date as 25 June 2007 and identifies Armind as the label. The same listing gives the record's tracklist as "Miserere & Rush Hour (Original Mix)" and "Rush Hour (No Intro Edit)".

A digital EP edition on Apple Music is listed as a three-track release dated 2 June 2007, issued by Armada Music, and includes the radio edit, "Miserere & Rush Hour", and the no intro edit. The track was also included on van Buuren's mix album A State of Trance 2007, where "Miserere" and "Rush Hour" appear as the opening tracks of the second disc.

== Critical reception ==
Nine years after its release, Idris Jones from webmedia We Rave You affirmed that "'Rush Hour' is undoubtedly one of the most distinctive, significant and timeless trance tracks of all time." He acclaimed "its opening atmosphere, the high tempo rhythmic percussion that underlays the rising chords set a spine tingling precedent for the remainder of the track".

== Track listings ==
- Netherlands – Armind – digital download (ARMD1041)
1. "Miserere" & "Rush Hour" – 11:40
2. "Rush Hour" (no intro edit) – 9:35
- Netherlands – Armind – 12" (ARMD1041)
1. "Miserere" & "Rush Hour" – 11:40
2. "Rush Hour" (radio edit) – 2:53
3. "Rush Hour" (no intro edit) - 9:35
- Netherlands – Armada – CD single (ARMA098)
1. "Rush Hour" (radio edit) – 2:53
2. "Rush Hour" (extended mix) – 9:33
- United States – Ultra – digital download (UL1581)
1. "Rush Hour" (radio edit) - 2:53
2. "Rush Hour" (no intro mix) - 9:34
3. "Miserere" & "Rush Hour" - 11:40

== Other appearances ==
"Rush Hour" was included on A State of Trance 2007, appearing after "Miserere" at the start of the second disc. It was also included on A State of Trance Year Mix 2007, where it appears on the second disc.

== Charts ==
Chart (2007)	Peak position
Finland (Suomen virallinen lista)	13
Netherlands (Dutch Top 40)	31
Netherlands (Single Top 100)	30
