= Never Say Never (Armin van Buuren song) =

2009 single by Armin van Buuren

Single by Armin van Buuren featuring Jacqueline Govaert

from the album Imagine
- Released: 29 June 2009
- Studio: Armada Studios, Amsterdam
- Genre: Vocal trance
- Length: 2:53 (radio edit); 7:03 (extended mix)
- Label: Armind; Armada
- Songwriters: Armin van Buuren; Benno de Goeij; Jacqueline Govaert
- Producers: Armin van Buuren; Benno de Goeij

Armin van Buuren singles chronology
"Fine Without You" (2009)	"Never Say Never" (2009)	"Broken Tonight" (2009)

Jacqueline Govaert singles chronology
"Abraça-Me" / "Omhels me dan" (2006)	"Never Say Never" (2009)	"Overrated" (2010)

"Never Say Never" is a song by Dutch disc jockey and record producer Armin van Buuren. It features vocals and lyrics from Dutch singer and songwriter Jacqueline Govaert. The song was released in the Netherlands by Armind on 29 June 2009 as the fifth and last single from van Buuren's third studio album Imagine.

== Background and release ==
"Never Say Never" originally appeared on Armin van Buuren's third studio album Imagine, where it was included as the seventh track. The song features vocals by Dutch singer-songwriter Jacqueline Govaert, then known as the lead singer of Dutch rock band Krezip. Van Buuren had previously reworked Krezip's song "Stay" in 2003, which led to the collaboration with Govaert for Imagine.

The song was released as a single through Armada Music on 29 June 2009. The single package includes the radio edit, extended mix and remixes by Alex Gaudino, Myon & Shane 54 and Omnia. Additional digital releases were issued through Armind in July 2009 under the catalogue number ARMD1065.

== Composition ==
"Never Say Never" is a vocal trance track built around Govaert's lead vocal performance and van Buuren and Benno de Goeij's production. The album version runs for 6 minutes and 59 seconds. The song has a tempo of 134 beats per minute. The Myon & Shane 54 extended remix is set at 134 beats per minute in C minor, while the Omnia extended remix is set at 131 beats per minute in C minor.

== Music video ==
A music video to accompany the release of "Never Say Never" was first released onto YouTube on 18 June 2009. The music video contains extracts from van Buuren's and Govaert's performances during Armin Only: Imagine tour shows.

== Track listing ==
- Netherlands – Armada digital / Armada – digital download & CD (ARDI946 / ARMA147)
1. "Never Say Never" (radio edit) – 2:53
2. "Never Say Never" (extended mix) – 7:03
3. "Never Say Never" (Alex Gaudino remix) – 6:53
4. "Never Say Never" (Myon & Shane 54 remix) – 7:54
5. "Never Say Never" (Omnia remix) – 7:35
- Netherlands – Armind – 12" (ARMD1065)
1. "Never Say Never" (extended mix) – 7:02
2. "Never Say Never" (Myon & Shane 54 remix) – 7:54
3. "Never Say Never" (Alex Gaudino remix) – 6:53
- Netherlands – Armind – digital download (ARMD1065)
1. "Never Say Never" (extended mix) – 7:03
2. "Never Say Never" (Myon & Shane 54 remix) – 7:54
3. "Never Say Never" (Omnia remix) – 7:33
4. "Never Say Never" (Alex Gaudino remix) – 6:53
5. "Never Say Never" (Alex Gaudino dub) – 6:54
- Belgium – Mostiko – CD single
1. "Unforgivable" (radio edit) – 2:53
2. "Unforgivable" (Alex Gaudino remix) – 6:53
- Netherlands – Armind – digital download Namatjira remix (ARMD1303A)
1. "Never Say Never" (Namatjira remix) – 3:30

== Charts ==
Chart (2009)	Peak position
Belgium (Ultratop 50 Flanders)	28
Netherlands (Dutch Top 40)	21
Netherlands (Single Top 100)	32

== Release history ==
Release dates and formats for "Never Say Never"
Region	Date	Format	Label	Catalogue	Ref.
Worldwide	29 June 2009	Digital download	Armada Music	—	
Netherlands	2 July 2009	CD single	Armada Music	ARMA174	
Worldwide	13 July 2009	Digital download	Armind	ARMD1065	
Worldwide	15 September 2016	Digital download	Armind	ARMD1303	
