= Going Wrong (song) =

2008 single by Armin van Buuren and DJ Shah

Single by Armin van Buuren and DJ Shah featuring Chris Jones

from the album Imagine and Songbook
- Released: 7 April 2008
- Studio: Armada Studios, Amsterdam
- Genre: Vocal trance
- Length: 3:31 (radio edit); 5:36 (album version); 5:58 (extended mix)
- Label: Armind; Shah-Music; Armada; Ultra
- Songwriters: Armin van Buuren; Benno de Goeij; Roger-Pierre Shah; Christopher Jones
- Producers: Armin van Buuren; Benno de Goeij; DJ Shah

Armin van Buuren singles chronology
"If You Should Go" (2008)	"Going Wrong" (2008)	"In and Out of Love" (2008)

DJ Shah singles chronology
"Who Will Find Me" (2007)	"Going Wrong" (2008)	"Don't Wake Me Up" (2008)

Chris Jones singles chronology
"Going Wrong" (2008)	"Utopia" (2009)

"Going Wrong" is a song by Dutch disc jockey and record producer Armin van Buuren and German disc jockey and record producer DJ Shah. It features vocals and lyrics from British singer Chris Jones. The song was released in the Netherlands by Armind and Shah-Music on 7 April 2008 as the first single from van Buuren's third studio album Imagine and as the third single from Shah's studio album Songbook.

The song has been performed live by van Buuren, Shah on keyboards and Jones for vocals during the Armin Only: Imagine tout shows in Europe, America and Australia. The first performance of the song was played on 19 April 2008 in Utrecht, in the Netherlands, in front of 20,000 fans.

== Background and release ==
"Going Wrong" was released as a collaboration between Armin van Buuren and German DJ and producer DJ Shah, featuring vocals by British singer Chris Jones. Van Buuren's official website lists the single as an Armind release dated 7 April 2008 and gives its tracklist as DJ Shah's Magic Island Mix, Armin van Buuren's Universal Religion Remix, Armin van Buuren's Extended Mix and Armin van Buuren's Radio Edit.

Apple Music lists a 13-track edition dated 7 April 2008, issued by Armada Music under exclusive licence from Armin Audio B.V. and Shah Music. A four-track EP edition is listed by Apple Music with a release date of 31 March 2008.

The song was included on van Buuren's third studio album Imagine and on DJ Shah's studio album Songbook.

== Music video ==
A music video to accompany the release of "Going Wrong" was first released onto YouTube on 9 April 2009.

== Track listing ==
- Netherlands – Armada – Digital download / CD (ARMA129)
1. "Going Wrong" (Armin van Buuren's Radio Edit) – 3:35
2. "Going Wrong" (Armin van Buuren's Extended Mix) – 6:00
3. "Going Wrong" (Armin van Buuren's Universal Religion Mix) – 7:04
- United States – Ultra – Digital download / CD (UL1721)
1. "Going Wrong" (Armin van Buuren's Radio Edit) – 3:32
2. "Going Wrong" (Original Mix) – 8:19
3. "Going Wrong" (Album Mix) – 4:44
4. "Going Wrong" (Armin van Buuren's Extended Mix) – 5:59
5. "Going Wrong" (Armin van Buuren's Universal Religion Mix) – 7:04
6. "Going Wrong" (DJ Shah's Magic Island Mix) – 8:52
7. "Going Wrong" (Acoustic Mix) – 4:13
- Netherlands – Armind – Digital download / 12" (ARMD1052)
1. "Going Wrong" (Armin van Buuren's Extended Mix) – 5:58
2. "Going Wrong" (Armin van Buuren's Universal Religion) – 7:04
3. "Going Wrong" (DJ Shah's Magic Island Mix) – 8:51
- France – Vector – Digital download (VECTOR017)
1. "Going Wrong" (Armin van Buuren's Radio Edit) – 3:32
2. "Going Wrong" (Armin van Buuren's Extended Mix) – 5:58
3. "Going Wrong" (Armin van Buuren's Universal Religion Mix) – 9:21
4. "Going Wrong" (Album Mix) – 4:43
5. "Going Wrong" (Acoustic Mix) – 4:12
6. "Going Wrong" (Original Mix) – 8:18
7. "Going Wrong" (DJ Shah's Magic Island Mix) – 8:51

== Charts ==
Chart (2008)	Peak position
Canada Hot 100 (Billboard)	88
Netherlands (Dutch Top 40)	22
Netherlands (Single Top 100)	5
Portugal (AFP)	30
US Dance/Mix Show Airplay (Billboard)	22
