= Utopia (Within Temptation song) =

Single by Within Temptation featuring Chris Jones

from the album An Acoustic Night at the Theatre
- B-side: "Restless (Live at Beursgebouw Eindhoven 23-11-2007)"
- Released: 23 October 2009
- Genre: Acoustic rock
- Label: GUN; Sony BMG
- Songwriter(s): Sharon den Adel; Daniel Gibson
- Producer(s): Daniel Gibson

Within Temptation singles chronology
"Forgiven" (2008)	"Utopia" (2009)	"Faster" (2011)

Chris Jones singles chronology
"Going Wrong" (2008)	"Utopia" (2009)	"Starting Right Now" (2011)

"Utopia" is the first single from the Dutch symphonic metal band Within Temptation's live album An Acoustic Night at the Theatre. The song features guest vocals from Chris Jones, a British singer. The single was released on 23 October 2009.

== Formats and track listings ==
- 2-track single
1. "Utopia" (3:50)
2. "Restless" (Live at Beursgebouw Eindhoven 23-11-2007) (5:59)

== Reception ==
Alistair Lawrence of BBC Music called the track "nothing more than a custom-built acoustic ballad, but ensures their fans go home having heard something new".

== Music video ==
The video was posted on Within Temptation's official YouTube page on 28 September 2009. It is directed by Oscar Verpoort. The video shows a man walking around a city witnessing various people committing crimes, such as a man stealing a blind woman's wallet and a prostitute being picked up by an older man. He saves a child from almost being hit by a car when his mother wasn't paying attention to what he was doing. As the boy looks back, there is nobody there, suggesting that the man was an angel-like apparition. The band is also seen performing in a run down building. It is also the last video to feature drummer Stephen van Haestregt who departed the band in 2010.

== Charts ==
Chart (2009)	Peak position
Belgium (Ultratop 50 Flanders)	37
Finland Download (Latauslista)	24
Netherlands (Single Top 100)	32
Poland (Airplay Chart)	4
Switzerland (Schweizer Hitparade)	88
