= Eternity (Alibi song) =

Single by Armin van Buuren & DJ Tiësto Present Alibi

from the album Magik Five: Heaven Beyond
- Released: 21 June 2000
- Genre: Uplifting trance
- Length: 3:31 (Original IC Edit); 7:33 (Original IC Mix)
- Label: Armind; United; Vandit
- Songwriter(s): Armin van Buuren; Tijs Verwest
- Producer(s): Armin van Buuren; DJ Tiësto

Alibi and Major League singles chronology
| "Eternity" (2000) | "Wonder Where You Are?" / "Wonder?" (2000) |

"Eternity" is a song by Dutch disc jockeys and producers Armin van Buuren and DJ Tiësto under the alias Alibi. It was released in on 21 June 2000 in the Netherlands on Armind as 12" vinyl and CD single. It is the second single from DJ Tiësto's compilation album Magik Five: Heaven Beyond.

The track was supported by Paul van Dyk who played it at Love Parade and decided to sign it on his label Vandit Records.

== Critical review ==
16 years after its release, webmedia We Rave You estimates that "Eternity" is "A beautiful mix of pounding dance-floor driven percussion progressing into a beautiful array of dreamy, melodic sounds, this is one of those tunes that sits as one of the benchmarks in trance and lives long in the memory of fans of the genre. An absolutely timeless chord progression runs throughout this tune and the climax is nothing short of epic."

== Music video ==
A music video of the song was realised in 2000. It features a little boy playing his drum in the wood and surrounded by dancers.

== Track listing ==
Netherlands - 12" - Armind (ARMD004)

1. "Eternity" (Original IC Mix) - 7:33
2. "Eternity" (Armin van Buuren's Rising Star Mix) - 9:20

Netherlands - CD single - Armind (ARM004-3)

1. "Eternity" (Original IC Edit) - 3:37
2. "Eternity" (Armin van Buuren's Rising Star Edit) - 3:53

Netherlands - CD maxi-single - Armind (ARM004-9)

1. "Eternity" (Original IC Edit) - 3:31
2. "Eternity" (Armin van Buuren's Rising Star Edit) - 3:49
3. "Eternity" (Original IC Mix) - 7:33
4. "Eternity" (Armin van Buuren's Rising Star Mix) - 9:20

Netherlands - 12" Remixes - Armind (ARMD010)

1. "Eternity" (The Thrillseekers New Horizon Mix) - 8:42
2. "Eternity" (Vank Remix) - 7:31

Germany - 12" - Vandit (VANDIT RECORDS 009)

1. "Eternity" (Original IC Mix) - 7:33
2. "Eternity" (The Thrillseekers Eternal Mix) - 7:16
3. "Eternity" (Armin van Buuren's Rising Star Mix) - 9:20

Germany - CD maxi-single - Urban

1. "Eternity" (Original IC Edit) - 3:31
2. "Eternity" (Armin van Buuren's Rising Star Edit) - 3:49
3. "Eternity" (The Thrillseekers Eternal Mix) - 7:16
4. "Eternity" (Original IC Mix) - 7:33
5. "Eternity" (Armin van Buuren's Rising Star Mix) - 9:20

Netherlands - Digital download reissue - Armada Digital (ARDI206)

1. "Eternity" (Original IC Mix) - 7:49
2. "Eternity" (Armin van Buuren's Rising Star Mix) - 9:24
3. "Eternity" (The Thrillseekers Eternal Mix) - 7:15

Estonia - Digital download

1. "Etenity" (Kaimo K Rework) - 6:17

== Charts ==
| Chart (2000) | Peak position |
|---|---|
| Netherlands (Single Top 100) | 93 |
