= Perpetuous Dreamer =

Dutch dance act

Perpetuous Dreamer was an alias of Armin van Buuren, which is known for the song "The Sound of Goodbye". The track, which was co-produced with Fuel 2 Fire, went to number one on the US dance chart. As with most early electronic music releases in the pre internet era, the use of aliases has created very confusing names for the mixes over the years of re-releasing tracks.

== Discography ==
The discography below aims to collect the releases by Armin van Buuren on this alias. Several other artists have also remixed the tracks but are not listed.

Track	Release date	Writers	Length	Notes
Perpetuous Dreamer - Future Fun-Land (Original Mix)	September 1999	Armin van Buuren	7:15	Also known as 12inch (12'') mix
Perpetuous Dreamer ft. Carmen Mimosa - Future Fun-Land	September 1999	Armin van Buuren	7:13	This is the vocal mix of the song. Also known as 12'' vocal mix
Perpetuous Dreamer - Future Fun-Land (Perpetuous Dreamer Discended Fun-Land Remix)	September 1999	Armin van Buuren	7:28	
Perpetuous Dreamer - The Sound of Goodbye (Original Mix)	2001	Armin van Buuren, Fuel 2 Fire	8:45	This track was later re-released under the name Armin van Buuren - The Sound of Goodbye.; This track is also known as Armin's Tribal Feel Mix; There is a common misconception that the Simon & Shaker Remix is the original mix of the song.
Perpetuous Dreamer - The Sound of Goodbye (Armin's Tribal Feel Dub)	2001	Armin van Buuren, Fuel 2 Fire	8:16	Non vocal mix of the track
Perpetuous Dreamer - The Sound of Goodbye (Rising Star Remix)	2001	Armin van Buuren, Fuel 2 Fire	10:46	
Perpetuous Dreamer - Dust.Wav (Original Mix)		Armin van Buuren, Adrian & Raz	10:00	Also known as the Rising Star Remix.
Perpetuous Dreamer - Dust.Wav (Rising Star Dub.Wav Mix)		Armin van Buuren, Adrian & Raz	8:50	This is the dub mix of the song.; Also known as Perpetuous Dreamer - Dub.Wav
Perpetuous Dreamer - Dust.Wav (Rising Star Instrumental Mix)		Armin van Buuren, Adrian & Raz	9:57	This is the instrumental mix of the song.
Perpetuous Dreamer - Future Fun-Land (Perpetuous Dreamer 2004 Remix)	February 2004	Armin van Buuren	8:04	Also known as Future Fun-Land 2004 or Future Fun-Land (Original Mix)

== See also ==
- List of artists who reached number one on the US Dance chart
