= Roger Shah =

German electronic music producer

- Also known as: Jukebox 80s, High Noon at Salinas, Magic Island, Raul Pablo Sanchez, Savannah, Sunlounger
- Born: Roger-Pierre Shah; 29 November 1972 (age 53); Esslingen am Neckar, West Germany
- Genres: Balearic trance, balearic beat
- Occupations: DJ, producer, radio show host/DJ
- Years active: 1996–present
- Labels: Armada, Black Hole, Anjunabeats, Magic Island

Roger Shah (German pronunciation: [ˈʁɔdʒɐ ˈʃaː]; born on 29 November 1972), also known as DJ Shah and Sunlounger, is a German electronic music composer and producer.

== Biography ==
=== History ===
Roger Shah was born in Esslingen, West Germany, to a German mother and a Pakistani father. His brother Pedro del Mar (real name Patrick Shah), also a trance DJ, hosts a bi-weekly vocal trance show called Mellomania. Roger first began to hit his production stride in his native country in 1999, putting out the tracks "Claps", "The Mission", and "Tides of Time". In 2003, Virgin Records imprint Nebula signed his "High" release. This marked his first non-domestic release, and over the next five years, he produced a range of trance labels such as Black Hole Recordings, Anjunadeep and Vandit.

Roger Shah was featured in DJ Mag Top 100 list five times. As a producer, he has worked with and produced for artists such as Tiësto, Armin van Buuren, Paul van Dyk, Sarah McLachlan, Kosheen, Bryan Adams and Moya Brennan.

=== The Armin Connection ===
In 2007, Armin van Buuren named Shah's "Who Will Find Me" release his favourite track of 2007. Having heard the demo of its follow-up, van Buuren saw crossover potential in the track and made contact in early 2008 to ask if Shah would like to collaborate. The result was the Chris Jones song "Going Wrong", which reached number 5 in The Netherlands. The track went on to become one of the biggest-selling trance singles of the year. From there, Magic Island Records – Shah's primary label - moved from his stable to that of one of Armin's Armada Music.

=== Solo albums ===
Songbook was released by DJ Shah in 2008. Singles taken from it like "Don't Wake Me Up", "Going Wrong" and "Who Will Find Me". In 2011, this was followed up by another solo album, Openminded, released under the name Roger Shah. Again, this featured two CDs, one with club and the other with album mixes.

=== Live and DJ performances ===
In late 2008, Shah decided to change his artist name. Dropping the 'DJ' prefix, he revised it to Roger Shah – which signalled a move away from straightforward DJ sets. Roger Shah frequently uses a wireless keyboard interface such as the M-Audio Oxygen 25 (25-key USB midi controller) during live performance. Roger Shah has mentioned numerous times that he will perform with his laptop instead of CDs.

=== Pseudonyms and side projects ===
In addition to his name, Roger has also produced under various other aliases. Notable among them are DJ Shah, High Noon at Salinas, Magic Island, Savannah and Sunlounger. Shah is also one half of the Anjunabeats act Purple Moods and in many more groups such as Global Experience and Black Pearl.

=== Sunlounger ===
This project included the release of the Another Day on the Terrace album in 2007, which reached No.1 on Dutch iTunes' 'all-music-genres' chart and spawned four singles: "In & Out", "Aguas Blancas", "Crawling", and "White Sand". The project became so celebrated that Roger expanded Sunlounger into a live act - a performance that was featured on Armada's ArminOnly DVD. He credited this experience with his latter wholesale move into live Roger Shah performances. In 2009, Roger released the Sunlounger follow-up LP Sunny Tales. Its progeny singles included "Catwalk", "Mediterranean Flower", "Change Your Mind", and the much-revered "Lost" - voted as Tune of the Year for 2008. A State of Trance radio show was hosted by Armin van Buuren and numerous #1 airplay positions across the globe. His third album, The Beach Side of Life, was released in 2010.

=== Magic Island: Music for Balearic People – The Compilations ===
Shah's compilation series has seen thirteen outings (2008, 2009, 2010, 2012, 2014, 2015, 2016, 2017, 2019, 2021, 2022, 2023, 2026).

=== Remixes ===
Shah has reworked tracks for vocalists like Sarah McLachlan and Nadia Ali. He has also remixed tunes for Tiësto, Armin van Buuren, Mark Norman, York, Cosmic Gate, Josh Gabriel, Johan Gielen, System F, The Thrillseekers, Solarstone, Three Drives, Matt Darey and OceanLab.

== Discography ==
=== DJ Shah ===
==== Albums ====
- DJ Shah (2000)
- Songbook (2008)

==== Singles ====
- "Claps" (1999)
- "Commandments" (1999)
- "Riddim" (2000)
- "Tides of Time" (2001)
- "High" (2002)
- "Sunday Morning" (2003)
- "Sunset Road" (with York) (2004)
- "Beautiful" (feat. Jan Johnston) (2006)
- "Palmarosa" (2007)
- "Who Will Find Me" (2007) (feat. Adrina Thorpe)
- "Going Wrong" (with Armin van Buuren, feat. Chris Jones) (2008)
- "Don't Wake Me Up" (feat. Inger Hansen) (2008)
- "Back to You" (feat. Adrina Thorpe) (2008)

=== Roger Shah ===
==== Albums ====
- Openminded!? (2011)
- Music for Meditation Yoga & Any Other Wellbeing Moments (2016)
- No Boundaries (2018)
- Guardian of Dreams (with LeiLani) (2020)
- Roger Shah pres. Jukebox 80s / Nightride (2021)
- Dinner For Two (with Tom Benscher) (2022)
- Roger Shah & Ambedo / Tribute To Earth (2023)

==== Singles ====
- "You're So Cool" (with Tenishia, feat. Lorilee) (2009)
- "To the Sky" (feat. Chris Jones) (2009)
- "I'm Not God" (with Tenishia, feat. Lorilee) (2009)
- "Healesville Sanctuary" (with Signum) (2009)
- "Hold On" (with Judge Jules, feat. Amanda Angelic) (2010)
- "Catch a Cloud" (with Tenishia, feat. Lorilee) (2010)
- "Ancient World" (with Signum) (2010)
- "Over & Over 2010 / Guaba Beach" (2010)
- "Morning Star" (feat. Moya Brennan) (2011)
- "Hide U (with Sian Kosheen) (2011)
- "Shine" (with Sian Kosheen) (2012)
- "Perfect Love" (with Fila, feat. Adrina Thorpe) (2012)
- "Dance With Me" (feat. Inger Hansen) (2012)
- "One Love" (feat. Carla Werner) (2012)
- "Island" (feat. Adrina Thorpe) (2012)
- "Higher than the Sun" (feat. JES & Brian Laruso) (2013)
- "One Life" (feat. DJ Feel and Zara) (2014)
- "No Brainer" (2014)
- "Hope" (with Nicholas Eli) (2014)
- "Without You" (with Sied van Riel, feat. Jennifer Rene) (2014)
- "The Namib" (with Pierre Pienaar) (2014)
- "Eye 2 Eye (FSOE350 Anthem)" (with Aly & Fila, feat. Sylvia Tosun) (2104)
- "Louder" (with Paul Van Dyk, feat. Daphne Khoo) (2015)
- "Never Forget" (with Nathia Kate, feat. Amber) (2015)
- "Love Heals You" (with Leilani) (2016)
- "Reasons to Live" (with Moya Brennan) (2016)
- "Unbreakable" (with Aly & Fila and Susana) (2016)
- "Fire" (with Antillas and Zara Taylor) (2016)
- "Castles in the Sky" (with Inger Hansen) (2017)
- "Eternal Time" (feat. Leilani) (2017)
- "Call Me Home" (with Aisling Jarvis) (2017)
- "Skyarium" (with Taucher) (2018)
- "Star-crossed" (with JES) (2018)
- "For the One You Love" (with Ram, feat. Natalie Gioia) (2018)
- "Hold Your Head Up High" (with Aisling Jarvis) (2018)
- "A Different Part of Me" (with Susie Ledge) (2018)
- "Ocean Flame" (feat. Kristina Sky) (2018)
- "Without You" (with DJ Shog) (2018)
- "Essence of Life" (with Leilani) (2019)
- "When You're Here" (with Aisling Jarvis) (2019)
- "Triumvirate" (with Stoneface and Terminal) (2019)
- "Beautiful Lie" (with Yoav) (2019)
- "Natural Order" (with Rene Ablaze) (2019)
- "Save the World" (with Natalie Gioia) (2019)
- "Controverse" (with Stoneface and Terminal) (2019)
- "Patong Beach" (with George Jema) (2019)
- "Epoch" (with Pierre Pienaar and Dirkie Coetzee) (2019)
- "Malam" (with Dennis Sheperd and Richard Durand) (2020)
- "Take Me Back" (with Kristina Sky, featuring Emma Shaffer) (2020)
- "Firebird" (with Jukebox 80s) (2020)
- "Daytona" (with Jukebox 80s) (2020)
- "New Horizon" (with JES) (2023)

==== Compilations ====
- Magic Island: Music For Balearic People (2008)
- Magic Island: Music For Balearic People Vol. 2 (2009)
- Magic Island: Music For Balearic People Vol. 3 (2010)
- Magic Island: Music For Balearic People Vol. 4 (2012)
- Magic Island: Music For Balearic People Vol. 5 (2014)
- Magic Island: Music For Balearic People Vol. 6 (2015)
- Magic Island: Music For Balearic People Vol. 7 (2016)
- Magic Island: Music For Balearic People Vol. 8 (2017)
- Magic Island: Music For Balearic People Vol. 9 (2019)
- Magic Island: Music For Balearic People Vol. 10 (2021)
- Magic Island: Music For Balearic People Vol. 11 (2022)
- Magic Island: Music For Balearic People Vol. 12 (2023)

=== Sunlounger ===
==== Albums ====
- Another Day on the Terrace (2007)
- Sunny Tales (2008)
- The Beach Side of Life (2010)
- Balearic Beauty (2013)
- Sunsets & Bonfires (2021)
- After The Afters (2022)
- Distant Memories (2025)

==== Singles ====
- "White Sand" (2006)
- "Aguas Blancas" (2007)
- "In & Out" (2007)
- "Crawling" (2008)
- "Catwalk / Mediterranean Flower" (2008)
- "Lost" (feat. Zara) (2008)
- "Change Your Mind" (feat. Kyler England) (2009)
- "Found" (feat. Zara) (2010)
- "Breaking Waves" (feat. Inger Hansen) (2010)
- "Beautiful Night" (feat. Antonia Lucas) (2010)
- "Try To Be Love" (feat. Zara) (2012)
- "Finca" (feat. Rocking J) (2013)
- "I'll Be Fine" (feat. Alexandra Badoi) (2013)
- "Surrender" (feat. Chase) (2014)
- "Glitter and Gold" (feat. JES) (2014)
- "Sunkissed" (2015)
- "Come As You Are" (feat. Inger Hansen) (2016)
- "Dancing With a Ghost (with Eden Iris) "(2017)
- "I Can Feel" (with Dennis Sheperd) (2020)
- "One More Day" (with Ingsha) (2020)
- "Hello Sunrise" (2021)
- "Ok" (feat. Susie Ledge and Inger Hansen) (2021)
- "On the Other Side (Remixes)" (2021)
- "Halong Bay (Heatbeat Remix)" (2023)

==== Compilations ====
- Sunlounger – The Downtempo Edition (2010)
- Armada Collected: Sunlounger (2014)

=== Savannah ===
==== Singles ====
- "Savannah La Mar" (2006)
- "Body Lotion" (2009)
- "Darling Harbour" (2010)

=== Global Experience ===
Global Experience (2015)

=== High Noon at Salinas ===
==== Albums ====
- Beach Grooves, Vol. 1 (2017)
