= Sunny Tales =

Studio album by Sunlounger
- Released: 30 July 2008
- Recorded: December 2007–May 2008
- Genre: Balearic beat, ambient, trance, club, chill out
- Length: 124:06
- Label: Armada Music
- Producer: Roger-Pierre Shah

Sunlounger chronology
Another Day on The Terrace (2007)	Sunny Tales (2008)	The Beach Side of Life (2010)

Singles from Sunny Tales
- 1. "Catwalk / Mediterranean Flower" Released: 4 August 2008; 2. "Lost (feat. Zara)" Released: 22 December 2008; 3. "Change Your Mind (feat. Kyler England)" Released: 29 June 2009

Sunny Tales is the second full-length album by German electronic composer and producer Roger-Pierre Shah released under his alias 'Sunlounger'.

== Track listing ==
CD I - Chill
No.	Title	Writer(s)	Length
1.	"Sunny Tales"	Roger P. Shah, Ingo Zielinski	5:59
2.	"Change Your Mind (feat. Kyler England)"	Roger P. Shah, Kyler England	6:16
3.	"Mediterranean Flower"	Roger P. Shah, Eller van Buuren	5:32
4.	"Lost (feat. Zara)"	Roger P. Shah, Zara Taylor	5:37
5.	"Spiritual Hideout"	Roger P. Shah	5:44
6.	"Heart of the Sun (feat. CAP & Stephanie Asscher)"	Roger P. Shah, Raz Nitzan & Adrian Broekhuyse	6:44
7.	"Punta Galera"	Roger P. Shah	4:29
8.	"Your Name (feat. Lorilee)"	Roger P. Shah, Lorilee Deschreyver	4:53
9.	"Catwalk"	Roger P. Shah, Eller van Buuren	4:57
10.	"Talk to Me (feat. Zara)"	Roger P. Shah, Zara Taylor	6:46
11.	"One More Day (with Ingsha & Simon Binkenborn)"	Roger P. Shah, Ingsha, Raz Nitzan & Adrian Broekhuyse	6:00
12.	"A Balearic Breakfast (feat. Seis Cuerdas)"	Roger P. Shah, Martin & Ezequiel Etcheverry	3:46

CD II - Dance
No.	Title	Writer(s)	Length
1.	"Sunny Tales"	Roger P. Shah, Ingo Zielinski	6:09
2.	"Change Your Mind (feat. Kyler England)"	Roger P. Shah, Kyler England	7:23
3.	"Mediterranean Flower"	Roger P. Shah, Eller van Buuren	5:54
4.	"Lost (feat. Zara)"	Roger P. Shah, Zara Taylor	7:37
5.	"Spiritual Hideout"	Roger P. Shah	6:09
6.	"Heart of the Sun (feat. CAP & Stephanie Asscher)"	Roger P. Shah, Raz Nitzan & Adrian Broekhuyse	6:53
7.	"Punta Galera"	Roger P. Shah	5:10
8.	"Your Name (feat. Lorilee)"	Roger P. Shah, Lorilee Deschreyver	6:31
9.	"Catwalk"	Roger P. Shah, Eller van Buuren	6:23
10.	"Talk To Me (feat. Zara)"	Roger P. Shah, Zara Taylor	6:53
11.	"One More Day (with Ingsha & Simon Binkenborn)"	Roger P. Shah, Ingsha, Raz Nitzan & Adrian Broekhuyse	6:38

== Personnel ==
- Eller van Buuren – guitar on "Mediterranean Flower" and "Catwalk"
- Zara Taylor – vocals on "Lost" and "Talk To Me"
- Kyler England - vocals on "Change Your Mind"
- Lorilee DeSchryver - vocals on "Your Name"
