= Kristina Stykos =

American songwriter

Kristina Stykos is an American record producer, audio engineer, songwriter and performer based in Vermont. Her recording studio, Pepperbox Studio, is solar, wind and generator powered and fully off-the-grid.

== Debut ==
Her first self-produced release, In The Earth's Fading Light (2005), was designated “Best Vermont Album of the Year” by the Barre Montpelier Times Argus. Stykos completed her audio engineering education by earning a production certificate at the Berklee School of Music in Boston.

She has engineered and produced over 15 albums for herself and clients, many of those released on her own indie label: Thunder Ridge Records.

Stykos's solo album Wyoming Territory (2013), was supported by the Ucross Foundation and Brush Creek artist residencies of Wyoming.

== Recent works ==
Her recent albums include two collaborative projects, Beautiful Blood (2013) with singer-songwriter Steve Mayone of Boston, and Raven (2011) co-produced with the Grammy-nominated pianist Philip Aaberg of Montana.

"This certainly is not the voice of a bubblegum pop chanteuse. Stykos now delivers strong songs, with a mature, seemingly all-knowing vocal style." - Art Edelstein, arts reviewer, Barre Montpelier Times Argus
