= Lucy Saunders =

American writer (born 1957)

Lucy Saunders (born 1957) is an American writer whose work includes articles and books about craft beer, cooking with beer, and pairing food with beer. She is the author of five cookbooks including Cooking with Beer, Grilling with Beer, and The Best of American Beer & Food Along with two other women she contributed to an international collection of essays, Beer Hunter, Whisky Chaser in honor of Michael Jackson (writer), the British author of articles and books about single malt whisky and beer.

Saunders has studied baking and pastry at the Cooking and Hospitality Institute of Chicago. She teaches classes on pairing beer and cheese. Her books have been discussed in the Atlanta Journal-Constitution, and Fort Worth Star Telegram. She presented guided tastings for the American Homebrewers Association at annual conferences in Milwaukee in 1993, in Chicago in 2003, and in Denver in 2007. She also has conducted tastings for the Craft Brewers’ Conference, the American Cheese Society, and at many local and regional festivals. Saunders’ website, beercook.com, won a silver medal for Best Food Writing on the Internet from the Association of Food Journalists in 2002.
