= In and Out of Love (Armin van Buuren song) =

Single by Armin van Buuren featuring Sharon den Adel

from the album Imagine
- Released: 6 August 2008
- Studio: Armada Studios, Amsterdam
- Genre: EDM; breakbeat
- Length: 3:00 (radio edit); 6:04 (extended mix)
- Label: Armind; Armada; Ultra
- Songwriters: Armin van Buuren; Benno de Goeij; Sharon den Adel
- Producers: Armin van Buuren; Benno de Goeij

Armin van Buuren singles chronology
"Going Wrong" (2008)	"In and Out of Love" (2008)	"Unforgivable" (2009)

Sharon den Adel singles chronology
"Time" (2003)	"In and Out of Love" (2008)	"Use My Voice" (2020)

"In and Out of Love" is a collaboration between Dutch DJ and record producer Armin van Buuren and Dutch singer and songwriter Sharon den Adel from the band Within Temptation. It was released on 6 August 2008 as the second single from van Buuren's third studio album, Imagine.

The single has been performed live by Sharon and Armin during the Armin Only: Imagine shows. As of September 7, 2024, the single has more than 375 million views for its official music video on YouTube, making it the second most viewed video on Armada Music's YouTube channel.

== Background and release ==
"In and Out of Love" was recorded for Armin van Buuren's third studio album Imagine. The song features vocals by Dutch singer Sharon den Adel, lead vocalist of Within Temptation. Van Buuren's official website describes the song as the second single from Imagine and the follow-up to "Going Wrong", and characterizes the original version as "breakbeat-ish".

Release dates vary by edition. Apple Music lists a five-track EP dated 4 August 2008 and issued by Armada Music, while van Buuren's official website lists the single as an Armind release dated 18 September 2008. The release included remixes by Richard Durand and Norwegian trance duo The Blizzard.

== Later versions ==
A Lost Frequencies remix of "In and Out of Love" was released through Armada Music on 16 March 2015. A Diversion remix followed through Armind on 25 August 2016. An Innellea remix was released through A State of Trance on 28 July 2023.

In 2024, French DJ and producer Rivo and Armin van Buuren released a new version of "In and Out of Love", credited as "Rivo vs Armin van Buuren feat. Sharon den Adel". It was released on 28 June 2024 through Armada Music. The version was officially released after becoming popular on social media, including Instagram and TikTok. Armada Music described Rivo's version as an afro house take on the 2008 original, built around a gentle rhythm, warm piano chords and a reworked treatment of den Adel's vocal. According to Armada Music's newsroom, teasers of the track had generated more than 15 million combined views on TikTok before its release, and van Buuren performed the track during a back-to-back set with David Guetta at Ushuaïa Ibiza.

== Samples and cover versions ==
In January 2016, the song was sampled on British rapper Dave's single, "JKYL+HYD". Later, on June 28th 2024, Russian musician Lonown sampled the track as part of the song "Avangard", which became a viral hit.

In 2019, the song was covered by Visions of Atlantis on the album, Wanderers.

== Track listing ==
=== Netherlands digital download (ARDI811) ===
No.	Title	Length
1.	"In and Out of Love" (radio edit)	3:00
2.	"In and Out of Love" (extended mix)	6:04
3.	"In and Out of Love" (The Blizzard remix)	7:53
4.	"In and Out of Love" (Richard Durand remix)	7:44
5.	"In and Out of Love" (Richard Durand no vocals remix)	7:26

=== Netherlands / Belgium CD single (ARMA153) ===
No.	Title	Length
1.	"In and Out of Love" (radio edit)	3:00
2.	"In and Out of Love" (extended mix)	6:04
3.	"In and Out of Love" (The Blizzard remix)	7:53
4.	"In and Out of Love" (Richard Durand remix)	7:44

=== Netherlands 12" (ARMD1056) ===
No.	Title	Length
1.	"In and Out of Love" (extended mix)	6:04
2.	"In and Out of Love" (The Blizzard remix)	7:53
3.	"In and Out of Love" (Richard Durand remix)	7:44

=== Netherlands 12" (ARDI845) ===
No.	Title	Length
1.	"In and Out of Love" (Push Trancedental remix)	7:42

=== 2009 US / France digital download and CD single (UL1917/ACADEMY037) ===
No.	Title	Length
1.	"In and Out of Love" (radio edit)	3:00
2.	"In and Out of Love" (extended mix)	6:04
3.	"In and Out of Love" (The Blizzard remix)	7:53
4.	"In and Out of Love" (Richard Durand remix)	7:44
5.	"In and Out of Love" (Richard Durand no vocals remix)	7:26
6.	"In and Out of Love" (Push Trancedental remix)	7:42

=== 2010 UK CD single ===
No.	Title	Length
1.	"In and Out of Love" (UK radio edit)	2:47

=== 2010 UK remixes (GLOBE1429) ===
No.	Title	Length
1.	"In and Out of Love" (Chicane remix)	7:30
2.	"In and Out of Love" (Klubfiller remix)	6:03

=== 2010 Netherlands digital download remixes ===
No.	Title	Length
1.	"In and Out of Love" (Chicane remix)	7:30
2.	"In and Out of Love" (LMC extended mix)	6:25
3.	"In and Out of Love" (Christian Davies remix)	6:27
4.	"In and Out of Love" (Kenny Hayes Blue Sphere mix)	7:56
5.	"In and Out of Love" (Whelan & Di Scala remix)	7:18
6.	"In and Out of Love" (UK radio edit)	2:47
7.	"In and Out of Love" (extended mix)	6:04

=== 2011 Iran digital download T&T remix ===
No.	Title	Length
1.	"In and Out of Love" (T&T remix)	8:45

=== 2014 Russia digital download Aimoon and Ma2shek bootlegs ===
No.	Title	Length
1.	"In and Out of Love" (Aimoon & Ma2shek bootleg)	7:14
2.	"In and Out of Love" (Aimoon & Ma2shek radio edit)	3:38

=== 2015 Netherlands digital download Lost Frequencies radio edit ===
No.	Title	Length
1.	"In and Out of Love" (Lost Frequencies radio edit)	3:07

=== 2015 Netherlands digital download Lost Frequencies remix ===
No.	Title	Length
1.	"In and Out of Love" (Lost Frequencies remix)	4:33

=== 2015 Netherlands digital download Lost Frequencies remixes ===
No.	Title	Length
1.	"In and Out of Love" (Lost Frequencies radio edit)	3:07
2.	"In and Out of Love" (Lost Frequencies remix)	4:33

=== 2015 Italy digital download Mr Dendo bootleg ===
No.	Title	Length
1.	"In and Out of Love" (Mr Dendo bootleg)	2:45

=== 2016 Netherlands digital download Diversion remix ===
No.	Title	Length
1.	"In and Out of Love" (Diversion remix)	6:27

=== 2024 Rivo version ===
Digital download / streaming
No.	Title	Length
1.	"In and Out of Love"	3:46
2.	"In and Out of Love" (extended mix)	6:24

== Charts ==
=== Weekly charts ===
Chart (2008–2011)	Peak position
Belgium (Ultratop 50 Flanders)	10
Hungary (Dance Top 40)	38
Netherlands (Dutch Top 40)	10
Netherlands (Single Top 100)	10
Russia Airplay (TopHit)	7
Sweden (Sverigetopplistan)	56

Chart (2025–2026)	Peak position
Greece International (IFPI)	49
Poland (Polish Airplay Top 100)	61
Poland (Polish Streaming Top 100)	70

=== Year-end charts ===
Chart (2008)	Position
Belgium (Ultratop Flanders)	59
Netherlands (Dutch Top 40)	76
Netherlands (Single Top 100)	42

Chart (2009)	Position
Hungary (Dance Top 40)	215
Russia Airplay (TopHit)	107

Chart (2010)	Position
Russia Airplay (TopHit)	11

Chart (2011)	Position
Russia Airplay (TopHit)	109

== Certifications ==
Certifications for "In and Out of Love"
Region	Certification	Certified units/sales
Streaming
Greece (IFPI Greece)	Gold	1,000,000^{†}
^{†} Streaming-only figures based on certification alone.
