= Fresh FM (Netherlands) =

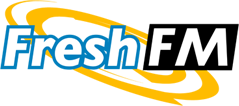
- Zoetermeer; Netherlands
- Broadcast area: Randstad, Netherlands
- Frequencies: Haaglanden: 95.6 MHz; Greater Amsterdam: 95.7 MHz; Rhine/Haarlemmermeer: 95.9 MHz; Utrecht: 103.4 MHz

Programming
- Format: Dance radio

Ownership
- Owner: SB Radio/MBM Corporative Worldwide

History
- First air date: 1999

Technical information
- Repeater: Rembrandttoren

Links
- Webcast: Web Stream; Web Stream (iTunes)
- Website: www.fresh.fm/

Fresh FM is a Dutch regional, commercial radio station transmitted through air in the regions of Greater Amsterdam, Utrecht, Haaglanden and Rhine/Haarlemmermeer. It broadcasts for free via the Internet. Fresh FM's programming is primarily dance music and is very diverse within that genre. The station's target audience is 17- to 49-year-olds and it is one of the most listened to regional radio stations. It is based in The Hague. Fresh FM has existed for several years and got a lot during the Zerobase in 2003 with the broadcasting territories of North Holland (Amsterdam, Haarlem and Haarlemmermeer), South Holland (The Hague, Leiden and Alphen) and the city Utrecht. Fresh FM's slogans are "Feel good!" and "It's all about the music".

== DJs ==
- Erwin van der Bliek
- Michel de Hey
- Mark van Dale
- Peter van Leeuwen
- Gijs Alkemade
- Marcello & Paolo Jay
- Peter Teunisse
- Frank Schildkamp
- Dominic Schep
- Frank van Huussen
- Norman
- Cor de Splinter - *Gizmo - *Darkraver
- Jurgen Rijkers - DJ Jurgen
- Wytske Kenemans
- John Digweed
- Ferry Corsten
- Chard
- Frank Schildkamp
- Norman
- Adam Beyer
- Paul van Dyk
- Carl Cox
- Above & Beyond
- Artento Divini
- DJ Jean

== Programs ==
- Turbulentie 2.0
- mix at 6
- DJ Jean @ Work
- Dance Files
- Group Therapy
- Club Fresh
- Hardhouse Generation
- ID
- Corsten's Countdown
- Fresh Feel Good 40 - hitlist with the 40 most played hits of last week.
- Weekend Afterparty

The other DJs have a program with the same name.
