= Paul Vinitsky =

- Born: Vinitsky Pavel; June 11, 1983; Dubna, Russia
- Genres: Trance, Progressive
- Occupations: Musician, producer, DJ
- Years active: 2004 - present
- Label: Vendace Records [2010 - present]
- Website: http://www.paulvinitsky.com

Paul Vinitsky (born Vinitsky Pavel; June 11, 1983 in Dubna, Moscow Region, Russia) is a Russian electronic dance music trance and progressive DJ & producer.

Vinitsky released in autumn 2011 his debut album with 9 vocalists and own unique option, the DJ singing his own tracks on stage.

== Biography ==
Vinitsky is from the capital of Russian Federation, Moscow.

Vinitsky is the unique artist of new progressive trance wave. He's a well known worldwide Russian DJ, producer & singer in progressive house, trance & tech trance scene. He's founder and A&R of the Moscow-based label 'Vendace Records', the best imprint from Russia. Just in several years he became one of the most known EDM artists in Russia. 4 years in a row he ranked in the top 100 Russian DJs. In 2012 Paul got his highest line in the global DJ MAG poll with #278, one of only 8 Russian EDM artists which ranked in the top 300.

Vinitsky is a large tourer. He has already performed at more than 250 gigs in over 50 cities in Russia, Indonesia, Ukraine, Poland, Czech Republic, Syria & Kazakhstan. He's a storming DJ and he's 'crazy' when he's playing on the decks. Fans say that he really experiments with every sound, with every movement of every part of his body; which is brought by how the DJ works with the crowd. He has played warmup sets for the biggest artists like Marco V, Sander van Doorn, ATB and on one scene with Markus Schulz, Kosheen and many others.

In the last 2 years, Vinitsky released dozen of singles, pack of remixes, mixed album and debut artist album Invincible. Many worldwide EDM known singers cooperated with Vinitsky and were featured on the album, such as Lo-Fi Sugar from US, #1 charted Kate Walsh from UK, another British house star Lizzie Curious, such singers as Khashassi, Meital de Razon and other artists. For the debut Vinitsky composed, produced and arranged 14 tracks by himself. Moreover, his unique 'Singing Dj' project and live show were featured on the album, where Vinitsky sings on studio and then performs live his own tracks on the stage. Vinitsky also made a 'banging' remix for Depeche Mode which was voted #1 in the Beatport contest, produced the remixes for many labels, including Black Hole Records, Dancepush, and such artists as Andy Duguid, Julie Thompson, Virtual Vault, Flash Brothers and more.

In April 2013 the second artist album Re*Invincible of Vinitsky came out with collaborations with the vocalists Elizabeth Fields from UK, Jane Maximova from Russia, Fisher from US. Vinitsky's vocal production is made together with Andrew StetS from Ukraine. Various remixes in trance and progressive house sounds are featured on the album including smashing ones from Adam Kancerski, Arisen Flame, Dejan S., Jay P (more known as house star Reflekt) and more.

His tracks and remixes were included in many compilations and tracklisted by huge number of DJs, including DJs such as Armin van Buuren, Paul Oakenfold, Marco V, Matt Darey, Andy Moor, Aly & Fila, Flash Brothers, Sean Tyas, Richard Durand, Marcus Schossow, Ronski Speed, Dj Feel, Sied van Riel and Solar Stone.

Vinitsky is a host of biweekly radioshow 'Trance Dance Show aka #TDS'. It is very prominent on the EDM scene and has dozens of thousands of listeners and podcast subscribers. It is broadcast on more than fifteen FM & internet stations in all continents. More than 25,000 people download the show episodes using #TDS podcast.

Vinitsky is the owner of the record label, Vendace Records, which is supported by all big artists like Armin van Buuren, Paul Oakenfold, Above & Beyond and others. Some DJs call the label one of their favorites (Armin van Buuren, Solarstone, Jorn van Deynhoven). Vinitsky opens new talents globally on it. In 3 years of existence Vendace Records released almost 80 singles, EP's and albums.

== Discography ==
=== Singles ===
- March 10, 2007 - "Irony"
- March 15, 2010 - "Water Dance" (feat. Amy)
- April 26, 2010 - "Foretaste"
- May 31, 2010 - "Solar Breeze"
- July 12, 2010 - "Fox-Cub"
- November 2, 2010 - "Unlucky Line"
- February 21, 2011 - "Me And You" (feat. Kate Walsh)
- April 11, 2011 - "Me And You (Remixes)" (feat. Kate Walsh)
- June 6, 2011 - "Two Worlds" (feat. Ruma)
- December 19, 2011 - "All I Know Now" (with Lo-Fi Sugar)
- March 5, 2012 - "Hypnotised" (with Lizzie Curious)
- August 8, 2012 - "Heaven" (with Marta Lay)
- December 24, 2012 - "One Heart" (with Fisher)
- March 11, 2013 - "Jogja"
- July 3, 2013 - "Two Worlds (Adam Kancerski Remixes)" (feat. Ruma)
- August 19, 2013 - "Save Me" (with Jane Maximova)
- October 7, 2013 - "Save Me (Progressive Remixes)" (with Jane Maximova)

=== Remixes ===
- February 27, 2007 - Global Warming (Remix: Memories)
- August 8, 2006 - Nostic (Remix: The Force)

=== Artist albums ===
- August 22, 2011 - Invincible
- September 26, 2011 - Invincible (Extended Mixes)
- April 22, 2013 - Re*Invincible

=== Mixed albums ===
- Vendace In The Mix 2012 (2013)
- Vendace In The Mix 2013 (2013)
