= Sophie Sugar =

British musical artist

- Born: Rochester, Kent, United Kingdom
- Origin: London, England
- Genres: Trance
- Occupations: Producer, dj
- Years active: 2004–present
- Labels: Galactive; ETCR; A State of Trance; Arlanda; Armada Music
- Website: sophiesugar.com

Sophie Sugar is a British trance DJ and musical artist and producer who has established herself as an international DJ. She is currently signed by Armada Music.

== Discography ==
- Call of Tomorrow, Galactive (2005)
- Isis, ETCR (2006)
- Sense of Connection, A State of Trance (2007)
- Fallen Too Far, A State of Trance (2007)
- In This Life, A State of Trance (2007)
- Day Seven, A State of Trance (2007)
- Redemption, A State of Trance (2008)
- Beside You, Armada (2009)
- Together, A State of Trance (2009)
- Skyline (2010)
- Sophie Sugar vs Sunlounger, Lost Together (AVB Mashup) (2010)
- All For You, A State of Trance (2010)
- Freefall 'Skydive' – Sophie Sugar 2011 Re-work (2011)
- Sophie Sugar & Tom Colontonio, Arlanda (2011)
- Sophie Sugar, Everworld (2025)

== See also ==
- Armada Music
