= The Sound of Goodbye (Perpetuous Dreamer song) =

Single by Armin van Buuren Presents Rising Star

from the album 002 Basic Instinct
- Released: 31 August 2001 (Netherlands); 3 September 2001 (UK, Germany & US); 3 December 2001 (France); 28 October 2007 (re-issue)
- Recorded: Summer 2000
- Genre: Uplifting trance
- Length: 3:25 (Armin's Tribal Feel Radio Edit); 3:15 (Above & Beyond Radio Edit); 8:45 (Armin's Tribal Feel); 7:15 (Above & Beyond Remix)
- Label: Armind; United; Cream; Nebula; Nervous; Ultra
- Songwriters: Armin van Buuren; Adrian Broekhuyse; Ed Moore
- Producers: Perpetuous Dreamer; F2F

Perpetuous Dreamer singles chronology
"Future Fun-Land" (1999)	"The Sound of Goodbye" (2001)	"Dust.Wav" (2002)

"The Sound of Goodbye 2008"
- 2008 re-issue

Perpetuous Dreamer singles chronology
"Dust.Wav" (2002)	"The Sound of Goodbye 2008" (2007)

"The Sound of Goodbye" is a song by Dutch disc jockey and producer Armin van Buuren under his alias Perpetuous Dreamer. It features uncredited vocals from Dutch singer Elles De Graf. The song was released on 31 August 2001 in the Netherlands on Armind as 12" vinyl and CD Maxi Single. It is included in van Buuren's compilation album 002 Basic Instinct.

It is considered as one of the most important trance works of van Buuren's career. The song received great success, charting at number one on the US Hot Dance/Disco Chart. The Armin's Tribal Feel is the official version in the Netherlands, whereas the Above & Beyond Remix gained more success in the UK and in the US. The song was rereleased on 28 October 2007 as "The Sound of Goodbye 2008" with a remix by Simon & Shaker.

== Background ==
Van Buuren declared in an interview that "The Sound of Goodbye" comes from the experience of a heartbreak during the summer of 2000 when he broke up with his former girlfriend in his personal life. He wanted to vent out his emotions and feelings in the song, created in one night. The song was his mourning and healing process.

== Critical review ==
According to Maria Clinton from webmedia EDM Identity, the song "will forever stand the test of time as it is a beautiful testament to the next level classic trance artistry that Armin van Buuren has always had running through his veins."

== Music video ==
A music video of the song was realised in 2001. It features singer Elles De Graf singing lying down in a landscape of green hills and rocks.

== Track listing ==
Netherlands – 12" – Armind (ARM007)

1. "The Sound of Goodbye" (Armin's Tribal Feel) – 8:45
2. "The Sound of Goodbye" (Armin van Buuren's Rising Star Remix) – 10:46

Netherlands – CD Single – Armind (ARM007-3)

1. "The Sound of Goodbye" (Armin's Tribal Feel Radio Edit) – 3:25
2. "The Sound of Goodbye" (Above & Beyond Radio Edit) – 3:15

Netherlands – CD Single / CD-ROM – Armind (ARM007-7)

1. "The Sound of Goodbye" (Armin's Tribal Feel Radio Edit) – 3:28
2. "The Sound of Goodbye" (Above & Beyond Radio Edit) – 3:19
3. "The Sound of Goodbye" (Music Video)

Netherlands – CD Maxi-Single – Armind (ARM007-9)

1. "The Sound of Goodbye" (Armin's Tribal Feel Radio Edit) – 3:28
2. "The Sound of Goodbye" (Above & Beyond Radio Edit) – 3:19
3. "The Sound of Goodbye" (Armin's Tribal Feel) – 8:45
4. "The Sound of Goodbye" (Above & Beyond Remix) – 7:15
5. "The Sound of Goodbye" (Armin's Tribal Feel Dub) – 8:16
6. "The Sound of Goodbye" (Armin van Buuren's Rising Star Mix) – 10:43
7. "The Sound of Goodbye" (Blank & Jones Remix) – 7:30
8. "The Sound of Goodbye" (Dajiro's Deep Dub) – 6:57

Netherlands – 12" Remixes – Armind (ARM008)

1. "The Sound of Goodbye" (Above & Beyond Vocal Remix) – 7:14
2. "The Sound of Goodbye" (Blank & Jones Remix) – 7:28
3. "The Sound of Goodbye" (Dajiro's Deep Dub) – 6:58

UK – 12" – Cream (CREAM6121)

1. "The Sound of Goodbye" (Above & Beyond Vocal Edit) – 5:41
2. "The Sound of Goodbye" (Armin van Buuren's Tribal Feel Vocal Edit) – 6:07
3. "The Sound of Goodbye" (Armin van Buuren's Rising Star Edit) – 7:54

UK – CD Single – Cream (CREAM6CD)

1. "The Sound of Goodbye" (Above & Beyond Radio Edit) – 3:22
2. "The Sound of Goodbye" (Above & Beyond Vocal Mix) – 7:16
3. "The Sound of Goodbye" (Armin van Buuren's Rising Star Edit) – 7:56

US – 12" – Nervous (NE20490)

1. "The Sound of Goodbye" (Above & Beyond Vocal Mix) – 7:14
2. "The Sound of Goodbye" (Armin's Tribal Feel Vocal Mix) – 8:45
3. "The Sound of Goodbye" (Above & Beyond Radio Edit) – 3:46

US – 12" Robbie Mixes – Nervous (NE20512)

1. "The Sound of Goodbye" (Robbie's Fierce Vocal Mix) – 9:40
2. "The Sound of Goodbye" (Robbie's Fierce Dub) – 7:25
3. "The Sound of Goodbye" (Accapella) – 0:58

France – 12" – Independence (IR0158)

1. "The Sound of Goodbye" (Armin's Tribal Feel) – 8:45
2. "Touch Me" (Armin van Buuren's Rising Star Mix) – 10:44

France – CD Maxi-Single – Independence (IR0159)

1. "The Sound of Goodbye" (Armin's Tribal Feel Radio Edit) – 3:25
2. "The Sound of Goodbye" (Armin's Tribal Feel) – 8:45
3. "The Sound of Goodbye" (Armin van Buuren's Rising Star Mix) – 8:38

UK – 12" Part 1 – Nebula (Nebt039)

1. "The Sound of Goodbye" (Armin van Buuren's Rising Star Mix) – 8:38
2. "The Sound of Goodbye" (Pablo Gargano Underwater Local)

UK – 12" Part 2 – Nebula (Nebtx039)

1. "The Sound of Goodbye" (Robbie's Fierce Vocal Mix) – 9:40
2. "The Sound of Goodbye" (Armin's Tribal Feel) – 8:45

US – CD Maxi-Single – Nervous (AMSTR237)

1. "The Sound of Goodbye" (Above & Beyond Radio Edit) – 3:46
2. "The Sound of Goodbye" (Above & Beyond Club Mix) – 7:14
3. "The Sound of Goodbye" (Armin's Tribal Feel Vocal Mix) – 8:45

Netherlands – 2006 digital download – Armada Digital (ARDI215)

1. "The Sound of Goodbye" (Armin's Tribal Feel Extended) – 8:48
2. "The Sound of Goodbye" (Armin's Tribal Feel Dub) – 8:17
3. "The Sound of Goodbye" (Armin van Buuren's Rising Star Remix) – 10:49
4. "The Sound of Goodbye" (Dark Matter 2001 Remix) – 7:18
5. "The Sound of Goodbye" (Above & Beyond Remix) – 7:17
6. "The Sound of Goodbye" (Blank & Jones Remix) – 7:32
7. "The Sound of Goodbye" (Robbie Rivera Remix) – 9:44
8. "The Sound of Goodbye" (Robbie Rivera Dub) – 9:56

Netherlands – 2007 re-issue digital download – Armind (ARMD1045)

1. "The Sound of Goodbye" (Simon & Shaker Radio Edit) – 3:20
2. "The Sound of Goodbye" (Nic Chagall Drumbeat Re-Edit) – 8:46
3. "The Sound of Goodbye" (Armin's Tribal Feel Extended) – 8:46
4. "The Sound of Goodbye" (Above & Beyond Remix) – 7:17
5. "The Sound of Goodbye" (Rising Star Remix) – 10:47
6. "The Sound of Goodbye" (Simon & Shaker Remix) – 8:30
7. "The Sound of Goodbye" (Robbie Rivera Remix Edit) – 3:46
8. "The Sound of Goodbye" (Armin's Tribal Feel Dub) – 8:16
9. "The Sound of Goodbye" (Above & Beyond US Radio Edit) – 3:51
10. "The Sound of Goodbye" (Above & Beyond UK Radio Edit) – 3:20
11. "The Sound of Goodbye" (Robbie Rivera Dub) – 9:56
12. "The Sound of Goodbye" (Robbie Rivera Remix Extended) – 9:44
13. "The Sound of Goodbye" (Dijaro's Dub) – 7:01
14. "The Sound of Goodbye" (Armin's Tribal Feel Radio Edit) – 3:29
15. "The Sound of Goodbye" (Blank & Jones Remix) – 7:31
16. "The Sound of Goodbye" (EDX's Indian Summer Remix) – 8:07
17. "The Sound of Goodbye" (EDX's Indian Summer Dub) – 8:07

Netherlands – 2007 Remixes digital download – Armind (ARMD1045)

1. "The Sound of Goodbye" (Yvan & Dan Daniel Remix) – 5:34
2. "The Sound of Goodbye" (Nic Chagall Drumbeat Re-Edit) – 8:46
3. "The Sound of Goodbye" (EDX's Indian Summer Remix) – 8:07
4. "The Sound of Goodbye" (EDX's Indian Summer Dub) – 8:07
5. "The Sound of Goodbye" (Simon & Shaker Remix) – 8:30

Netherlands – 2007 12" – Armind (ARMD1045)

1. "The Sound of Goodbye" (Nic Chagall Drumbeat Re-Edit) – 8:46
2. "The Sound of Goodbye" (Simon & Shaker Remix) – 8:30

Netherlands – 2007 CD Single – Armind (ARMA114)

1. "The Sound of Goodbye" (Simon & Shaker Radio Edit) – 3:20
2. "The Sound of Goodbye" (Nic Chagall Drumbeat Re-Edit) – 8:47
3. "The Sound of Goodbye" (Dark Matter Remix) – 7:11

Netherlands – 2007 CD Maxi-Single – Armind (ARMD1045M)

1. "The Sound of Goodbye" (Simon & Shaker Radio Edit) – 3:23
2. "The Sound of Goodbye" (Simon & Shaker Remix) – 8:33
3. "The Sound of Goodbye" (Nic Chagall Drumbeat Re-Edit) – 8:48
4. "The Sound of Goodbye" (Dark Matter Remix) – 7:20
5. "The Sound of Goodbye" (Armin's Tribal Feel Extended) – 8:51
6. "The Sound of Goodbye" (Rising Star Remix) – 10:52
7. "The Sound of Goodbye" (Above & Beyond Remix) – 7:19
8. "The Sound of Goodbye" (Blank & Jones Remix) – 7:34
9. "The Sound of Goodbye" (Robbie Rivera Remix Extended) – 9:44

US – 2008 re-issue digital download – Ultra (UL1685)

1. "The Sound of Goodbye" (Simon & Shaker Radio Edit) – 3:21
2. "The Sound of Goodbye" (Armin's Tribal Feel Radio Edit) – 3:30
3. "The Sound of Goodbye" (Armin's Tribal Feel Remix) – 8:46
4. "The Sound of Goodbye" (Armin's Tribal Feel Dub) – 8:17
5. "The Sound of Goodbye" (Above & Beyond US Radio Edit) – 3:51
6. "The Sound of Goodbye" (Above & Beyond UK Radio Edit) – 3:21
7. "The Sound of Goodbye" (Above & Beyond Remix) – 7:17
8. "The Sound of Goodbye" (Robbie Rivera Remix Edit) – 3:47
9. "The Sound of Goodbye" (Robbie Rivera Remix Extended) – 9:44
10. "The Sound of Goodbye" (Robbie Rivera Dub) – 9:57
11. "The Sound of Goodbye" (Dark Matter 2001 Edit) – 3:30
12. "The Sound of Goodbye" (Dark Matter 2001 Remix) – 7:19
13. "The Sound of Goodbye" (Dijaro's Dub) – 7:02
14. "The Sound of Goodbye" (EDX's Indian Summer Remix) – 8:07
15. "The Sound of Goodbye" (Yvan & Dan Daniel Remix) – 5:35
16. "The Sound of Goodbye" (Simon & Shaker Remix) – 8:32
17. "The Sound of Goodbye" (Rising Star Remix) – 10:50
18. "The Sound of Goodbye" (Nic Chagall Drumbeat Re-Edit) – 8:46
19. "The Sound of Goodbye" (Blank & Jones Remix) – 7:32

Netherlands – 2011 re-issue part 1 digital download – Adrian & Raz (ADRAZ001A)

1. "The Sound of Goodbye" (Robbie Rivera Extended Remix) – 9:42
2. "The Sound of Goodbye" (Armin's Tribal Feel Mix) – 8:47
3. "The Sound of Goodbye" (Simon & Shaker Remix) – 8:30
4. "The Sound of Goodbye" (Robbie Rivera Radio Edit) – 3:44
5. "The Sound of Goodbye" (Simon & Shaker Radio Edit) – 3:19
6. "The Sound of Goodbye" (Armin's Tribal Feel Radio Edit) – 3:29
7. "The Sound of Goodbye" (Nic Chagall Drumbeat Re-Edit) – 8:46
8. "The Sound of Goodbye" (Blank & Jones Remix) – 7:32
9. "The Sound of Goodbye" (Blank & Jones Short Cut) – 3:17
10. "The Sound of Goodbye" (Robbie Rivera Dub) – 9:56

Netherlands – 2011 re-issue part 2 digital download – Adrian & Raz (ADRAZ001B)

1. "The Sound of Goodbye" (Above & Beyond US Radio Edit) – 3:49
2. "The Sound of Goodbye" (Above & Beyond UK Radio Edit) – 3:22
3. "The Sound of Goodbye" (Above & Beyond Extended Mix) – 7:16
4. "The Sound of Goodbye" (Dark Matter Edit) – 3:28
5. "The Sound of Goodbye" (Dark Matter Extended Mix) – 7:16
6. "The Sound of Goodbye" (EDX's Indian Summer Remix) – 8:07
7. "The Sound of Goodbye" (Yvan & Dan Daniel Remix) – 5:34
8. "The Sound of Goodbye" (Maarten de Jong Remix) – 6:36
9. "The Sound of Goodbye" (Dijaro's Dub) – 6:56
10. "The Sound of Goodbye" (Armin's Tribal Feel Dub) – 8:16
11. "The Sound of Goodbye" (Rising Star Remix) – 10:42

Netherlands – 2018 Remixes digital download – Amsterdam Trance (AMSTR237)

1. "The Sound of Goodbye" (Steve Allen Extended Remix) – 4:47
2. "The Sound of Goodbye" (Ferrin & Morris Extended Remix) – 6:54
3. "The Sound of Goodbye" (Pedro Del Mar & Beatsole Extended Remix) – 7:07

== Charts ==
=== 2001–2002 ===
Chart (2001–2002)	Peak position
Germany (GfK)	52
Netherlands (Dutch Top 40)	26
Netherlands (Single Top 100)	42
UK Singles (Official Charts)	76
US Dance Club Songs (Billboard)	1

=== 2007 re-issue ===
Chart (2007)	Peak position
Netherlands (Single Top 100)	20

== See also ==
- List of number-one dance hits (United States)
