= Sied van Riel =

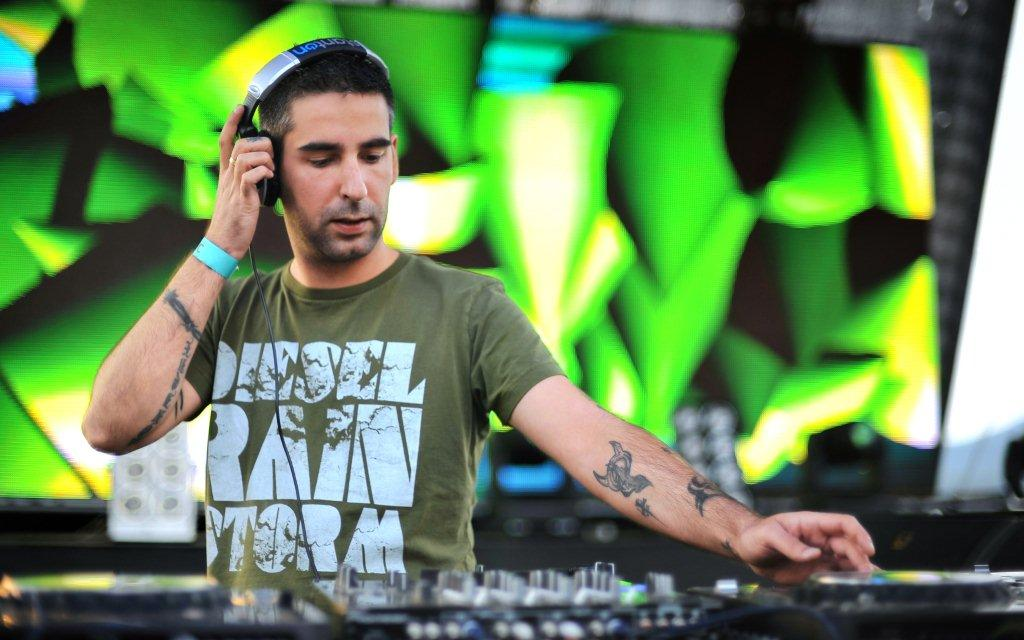
- Sied van Riel at Machac Festival in August 2009

Background information
- Born: 12 May 1978 (age 48); Rotterdam, Netherlands
- Origin: Spijkenisse, Netherlands
- Genres: Trance; electronica; dance; progressive trance
- Occupations: DJ; producer
- Years active: 2006–present
- Labels: Spinnin Records (2006–present); Black Hole Rec (2006–present)
- Website: siedvanriel.com

Sied van Riel (Dutch pronunciation: [ˈsit fɑn ˈril]) is a Dutch trance music DJ and producer originally from Rotterdam but currently residing in Spijkenisse. He came into the scene in the year of 2006 with the production of his first track, "Fearless" and the following year was signed to the known label Spinnin Records. He also has a one-hour weekly radio show called Rielism that airs on Afterhours.fm every Monday.

== Producing ==
Sied van Riel has released 5 mix compilations, In Riel Time on Spinnin' Records, Rielism 1, 2, 3 and most recently Rielism 4 on Black Hole Recordings in 2017 as well as numerous tracks and remixes on labels such as Spinnin' Records, Armada, Black Hole Recordings and under his own label Rielism.

== Performing ==
When not in the studio working on new mixes, Sied van Riel maintains an extensive international touring schedule. At the end of 2008 won "Best New Face" award for the 2008 Trance Awards. Sied supports the Dance4Life initiative and became an ambassador for them.

== DJ rankings ==
In October 2009, as in every other year the results of different polls held to rank top DJs came out. In the Trance Addict poll, Sied van Riel was ranked No. 41, jumping up 40 spots from the previous year. In the DJ Mag Top 100, Sied entered for the first time the top 100 ranking of No. 85.

== Discography ==
=== Singles ===
- 2006 Fearless (Subtraxx Digital)
- 2006 My Dreams (Expedition Music)
- 2007 Changing Places (Liquid Recordings)
- 2007 Sigh (Liquid Recordings)
- 2008 Dirty Volum (A State Of Trance) / as Simadith Project along with Marius Andresen & Dimitri de Wit
- 2008 Closer To You (2 Play Records)
- 2008 Contrasts (2 Play Records)
- 2008 Malibeer (Liquid Recordings)
- 2008 With The Flame In The Pipe (Liquid Recordings)
- 2008 Minimal Symphony (Liquid Recordings)
- 2008 One / Two (Liquid Recordings)
- 2008 Riel People (405 Recordings)
- 2008 Riel People Know (Captive)
- 2008 Rush (Black Hole Recordings)
- 2008 What You Want (Liquid Recordings)
- 2008 You Are My Dreams (Liquid Recordings)
- 2009 Mongoosed (Liquid Recordings)
- 2009 Sunrise (Black Hole Recordings)
- 2009 All Rise (Spinnin Records)
- 2010 All I Need / 12 Hz (Liquid Recordings)
- 2010 Crossroads (Liquid Recordings)
- 2010 Serendipity with Ummet Ozcan (Reset Records)
- 2010 Radiator with Radion6 (Oxygen Recordings)
- 2010 Serendipity Phase II with Ummet Ozcan (Reset Records)
- 2010 Another Heater with Radion6 (Oxygen Recordings)
- 2011 Mentalism (Reset Records)
- 2011 Stealing Time ft Nicole McKenna (Liquid Recordings)
- 2011 Bubble Blower (Reset Records)
- 2011 Audio 52 (Captivating Sounds)
- 2011 The Game ft. Fenja (Liquid Recordings)
- 2012 Tunnel Vision (Captivating Sounds)
- 2012 In Awe with Waakop Reijers (Captivating Sounds)
- 2012 DC 4AM (Captivating Sounds)
- 2012 Carved By Your Hands ft. Temper Heart (S107 Recordings)
- 2013 Past Present Future (Captivating Sounds)
- 2013 Adagio For Wings with J.O.C.(Subculture Recordings)
- 2014 Beast Within Me with David Forbes (Black Hole Recordings)
- 2014 Long Laster with Eximinds (Black Hole Recordings)
- 2014 Regulators with Bjorn Akesson(Future Sound Of Egypt Recordings)
- 2015 The Next Episode with Bjorn Akesson (Future Sound Of Egypt Recordings)
- 2015 In A Perfect World with Ian Standerwick (Subculture Recordings)
- 2015 GoRiel with Giuseppe Ottaviani (Rielism Recordings)
- 2015 S.L.A.P. with ReOrder (Rielism Recordings)
- 2015 Warpdrive with Radion6 (Armada Music)
- 2015 Without You with Roger Shah featuring Jennifer Rene(Magic Island Recordings)
- 2015 The Dark Matters (Rielism Recordings)
- 2016 Sirena (Rielism Recordings)
- 2016 BOW with Estigma (Vandit Recordings)
- 2016 Hear You Calling featuring Chloe (Rielism Recordings)
- 2016 The Reason featuring Jennifer Rene (Rielism Recordings)
- 2016 Geyser with Mike Sanders (Rielism Recordings)
- 2017 Rush (Sied van Riel Remix) Rielism Recordings
- 2017 Solitaire with Leaving Atlantis (Rielism Recordings)
- 2017 Rivella with Richard Durand (Rielism Recordings)
- 2017 Vampire (Subculture Recordings)
- 2018 On A Trip (Rielism)
- 2018 Hold Me Close with Natalie Gioia (Subculture Recordings)
- 2018 Universal Minds with Richard Durand (Reloaded Recordings)
- 2019 Techzilla + The Navigator (Subculture Recordings)

=== Remixes ===
- 2006 Corydalics - Along Overmind (Subtraxx Digital)
- 2006 Airbase - Sinister (First Second Records)
- 2007 Jonas Steur - Level Up (Black Hole Recordings)
- 2007 Robert Gitelman & Michael Tsukerman - Memories Of The Future (Adjusted Music)
- 2007 Adam White - Never Tell What You Think (Emalodic)
- 2007 Miika Kuisma - One Step Behind The Mankind (Subtraxx Digital)
- 2007 Misja vs Jazper - Project: Project (Adjusted Music)
- 2007 B.E.N. vs Digital Nature Feat. Brandon A. Godfrey - Save Me God (Total Digital Recordings)
- 2007 Amex - Spirals (Real Music Recordings)
- 2007 Leon Bolier - Summer Night Confessions (2 Play Records)
- 2008 Destination X - Dangerous (Lyon Echo)
- 2008 Claudia Cazacu - Elite (Couture)
- 2008 Offer Nissim Feat. Maya - For Your Love (Star 69 Records)
- 2008 Ashley Wallbridge Feat. Meighan Nealon - I Believe (Lyon Echo)
- 2008 Jose Amnesia Feat. Jennifer Rene - Invincible (Armind)
- 2008 Glenn Frantz - Melbourne (Deep End)
- 2008 Trebbiano - Mulberry Harbour (Black Hole Recordings)
- 2008 Alex M.O.R.P.H. - Walk The Edge (High Contrast Recordings)
- 2008 Arctic Quest Feat. Anita Kelsey - Your Smile (Doorn)
- 2008 Blank & Jones - Where You Belong (Soundcolours)
- 2009 Armin van Buuren Feat. Jennifer Rene - Fine Without You (Armind)
- 2009 Store N Forward - Hello World (Afterglow Records)
- 2009 Carl B - How Things Could Have Been (Intuition Recordings)
- 2009 Cosmic Gate Feat. Emma Hewitt - Not Enough Time (Black Hole Recordings)
- 2009 Sean Tyas - I Remember Now (Future Sounds of Egypt Recordings)
- 2009 Ferry Corsten - Shanti (Flashover Recordings)
- 2009 Jesse Voorn - 4 Music 4 Life (Kingdom Kome Cuts)
- 2009 Richard Durand - Silver Key (Magik Muzik)
- 2010 Arnej - The Day Will Come (Armada)
- 2011 Ben Gold - Pandemic
- 2012 John O'Callaghan ft. Kathryn Gallagher - Mess Of A Machine (Subculture)
- 2012 Allure - I Am (Magik Muzik)
- 2013 Alex M.O.R.P.H. - Sucker Punch (Sied van Riel Remix)
- 2013 Arctic Quest - Strings & Guitars (Sied van Riel Remix)
- 2014 Flynn & Denton & Audrey Gallagher - Say My Name (Sied van Riel Remix) Subculture Recordings
- 2014 Julie Thompson with Dragon & Jontron - Loved (Sied van Riel Remix) Black Hole Recordings
- 2014 Shogun - Laputa (Sied van Riel Remix) Armada Music
- 2015 David Forbes - Questions Must Be Asked (Sied van Riel Remix) Armada Music
- 2016 Super 8 & Tab - Komorebi (Sied van Riel Remix) Armind
- 2016 Tiesto - Traffic (Sied van Riel Remix) Rielism Recordings
- 2017 Sied van Riel - Rush (Sied van Riel Remix) Rielism Recordings

=== Compilation albums ===
- 2009: In Riel Time
- 2011: Rielism
- 2013: Rielism vol 2
- 2015: Rielism vol 3
- 2017: Rielism vol 4

In Riel Time Sampler 1 & 2 have also been released, containing 6 tracks each
