= Jaren Cerf =

American singer-songwriter

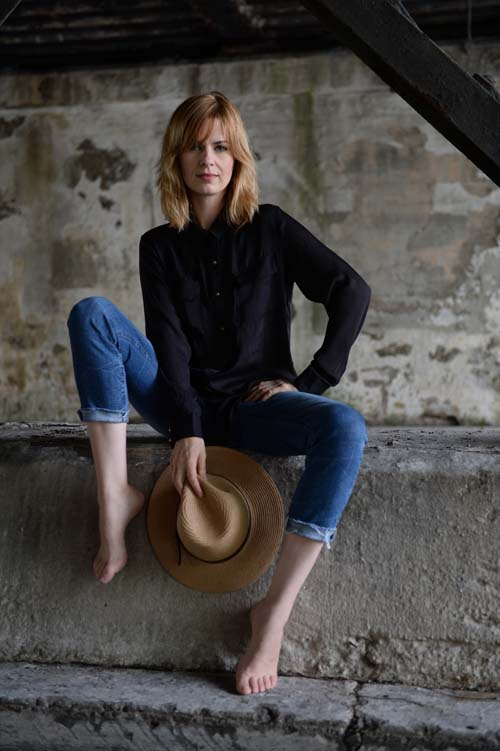

Background information
- Born: September 22, 1983 (age 42); Wyoming, United States
- Genres: Pop, folk, trance, EDM
- Occupation(s): Singer-songwriter, recording artist, actress
- Instrument(s): Vocals, guitar, piano
- Years active: 2006–present
- Labels: Independent

Jaren Cerf (born September 22, 1983) is an American recording artist and songwriter most recognized for her work in the trance music with artists like Armin van Buuren, Dash Berlin, and Cerf, Mitiska & Jaren. She has co-written songs for Canadian artists Lukay, Maiarah, Andee, Eva Avila, and Michelle Treacy. Additionally, she has released two folk albums since 2008 – Fixin' It Upright and 7 Year Itch.

In 2013, her song "This Is My Goodbye" with French DJ/producer Antoine Clamaran (under her alias Fenja) reached the No. 2 spot on the Billboard Club Charts for three consecutive weeks. In 2014, she co-wrote "We Are Gold", sung by Canadian recording artist Andee, which was featured at the Sochi Olympics.

In 2015 she starred in the stage production Oh Canada, What A Feeling, paying homage to Joni Mitchell, Celine Dion, and Sylvia Tyson, in which she earned favorable reviews.

In 2017, Jaren starred in Pat Collins's Irish-Canadian biopic, Song of Granite, about traditional Irish sean nos singer Joe Heaney. The film debuted at SXSW in March and went on to become Ireland's official submission for the 2018 Academy Awards for Best Foreign Language Film.
