= Armin van Buuren =

Dutch DJ and producer (born 1976)

Armin van Buuren OON
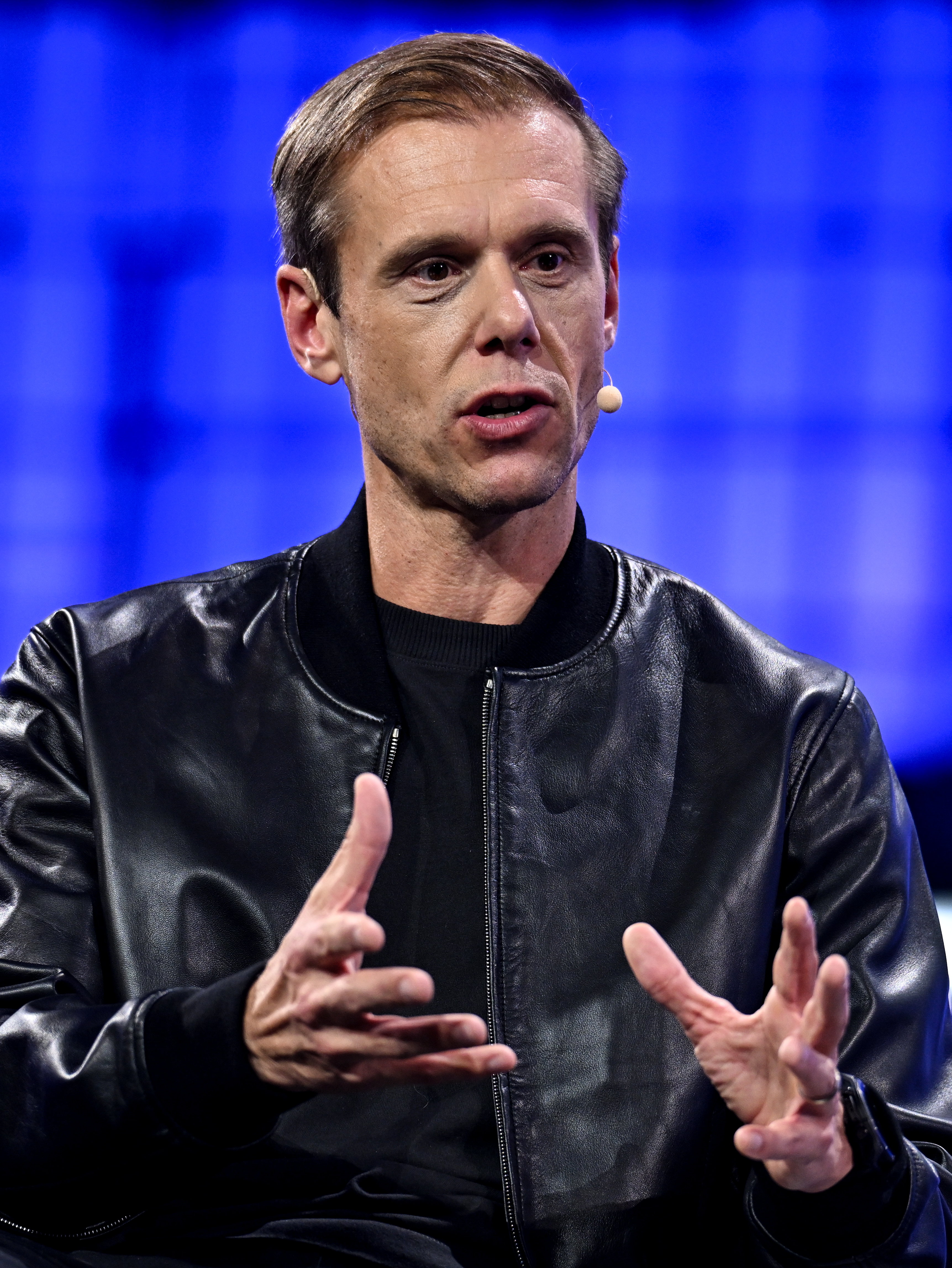
- Van Buuren in 2025

Background information
- Also known as: Rising Star; Perpetuous Dreamer
- Born: Armin Jozef Jacobus Daniël van Buuren; 25 December 1976 (age 49); Leiden, South Holland, Netherlands
- Origin: Koudekerk aan den Rijn, Netherlands
- Genres: EDM; trance; house; techno
- Occupations: DJ; record producer; remixer
- Instruments: Synthesizer; drum machine
- Years active: 1996–present
- Labels: Armada; A State of Trance; Armind; Kontor; Universal; Sony
- Spouse: Erika van Thiel (m. 2009)
- Children: 2
- Website: arminvanbuuren.com

Armin Jozef Jacobus Daniël van Buuren (Note: /væn ˈbjʊərən/ van BURE-ən; Dutch: [ˈɑrmɪ ˈɲoːzəf jaːˈkoːbʏz ˈdaːnijɛl vɑm ˈbyːrə(n)]) OON (born 25 December 1976) is a Dutch DJ, musician and record producer. Since 2001, he has hosted A State of Trance (ASOT), a weekly radio show, which is broadcast to nearly 40 million listeners in 84 countries on over 100 FM radio stations. According to the website DJs and Festivals, "the radio show propelled him to stardom and helped cultivate an interest in trance music around the world".

Van Buuren has won a number of accolades. He has been ranked the number one DJ by DJ Mag a record of five times, four years in a row. He was ranked fifth on the DJ Mag Top 100 DJs list in 2022, as well as fourth in 2015, 2016, 2019 and 2020, and third in 2017. In 2014, he was nominated for a Grammy Award for Best Dance Recording for his single "This Is What It Feels Like" featuring Trevor Guthrie, which makes him the fourth trance artist ever to receive a Grammy Award nomination. In the United States, he holds the record for most entries, twenty-one, on the Billboard Dance/Electronic Albums chart.

== Personal life ==
Armin Jozef Jacobus Daniël van Buuren was born in Leiden, on 25 December 1976, and grew up in Koudekerk aan den Rijn. He was inspired by French electronic music composer Jean-Michel Jarre and Dutch DJ and remixer Ben Liebrand. Van Buuren graduated from the Stedelijk Gymnasium Leiden in 1995, and studied law at Leiden University. He began working as a DJ in Club Nexus in 1996, playing multiple sets a week, most of which lasted six or more hours. In 1999, he met Dave Lewis who introduced him as a DJ in England and the United States. As his musical career began to take off, he put his law degree on hold, but he did return to graduate from law school in 2003.

On 18 September 2009, van Buuren married Erika van Thiel. Their daughter, Fenna, was born in July 2011. On 27 July 2013, just hours before he was due to headline the main stage at Tomorrowland, van Buuren announced that his wife had given birth to a son, Remy.

On 16 February 2018, van Buuren explored his family history in an episode of the TV series Verborgen verleden, the Dutch version of the UK series Who Do You Think You Are?

== Music career ==
=== 1996–1999: Early career and success ===
In 1996, van Buuren released EP and Push on Timeless Records. van Buuren had his first success with a track called "Blue Fear", which was released under the Cyber Records label in 1997. Another successful track, "Communication", was released under the same label and became popular in Ibiza, Spain in the summer of 1999. After being signed to AM PM Records, this track entered the UK Singles Chart at No. 18 in 2000.

In the beginning of 1999, van Buuren started his label Armind together with United Recordings. The first release, Gig – "One", was well received. The second release, "Touch Me" under the name Rising Star, was signed to Ministry of Sound in the UK, before the record was released. By the time of his third release, Gimmick – "Free" was signed to R&S Records. During this year, he remixed the first two singles of Gouryella (Gouryella and Walhalla) and, under the guise of Rising Star, produced a remix of L'Esperanza, a song by Airscape.

=== 2000–2004: 76 and A State of Trance series ===
In 2000, Van Buuren started his own Armin van Buuren compilation series, a mix of progressive house and vocal trance styles of music. His first compilation album, A State of Trance (not to be confused with his weekly A State of Trance radio shows), sold 10,000 copies and contains van Buuren's remix of Moogwai, "Viola". Teaming up with Tiësto, two new projects were born: Major League – "Wonder Where You Are?" was released on Black Hole Recordings and Alibi – "Eternity" was released on Armind. "Eternity" received club and chart success and was signed to Paul van Dyk's imprint Vandit Records. Another major collaboration followed this. Together with Ferry Corsten, van Buuren recorded a riff titled "Exhale" for the System F album, Out of the Blue. Released as a single, this track reached Gold status. Under the pseudonym Gaia he released "4 Elements" on Captivating Sounds, a sub-label of Warner Brothers.

His second album, Basic Instinct featured a new track: Perpetuous Dreamer – "The Sound of Goodbye". This track entered the Dutch charts in June 2001 at number 26. Later in the year, the track hit No. 1 on the Hot Dance Music/Club Play chart. The third album, In Motion was released 6 August 2001. A fourth album, Transparence, followed in 2002. In 2003, he worked with such artists such as DJ Seth Alan Fannin throughout a global tour on Dance Revolution in Europe, selling out to crowds of 20,000 people in the Netherlands.

In March 2001, van Buuren started his own radio show on ID&T Radio (traditionally broadcast in Dutch and later English since ASOT 183). In this weekly two-hour show, entitled A State of Trance, he plays the latest popular trance music tracks, and publishes the artists and track titles on his website. When ID&T Radio changed genres in 2004, van Buuren moved A State of Trance to Fresh FM and later SLAM!FM, two Dutch radio stations. It is now a weekly feature on Radio 538, the Dutch radio station, DI.FM, an online radio station, and on XM Satellite Radio, channel 52 in the United States and Canada. A complete list of stations that broadcast A State of Trance can be found at the ASOT section of Armin's website.

In 2002, he had a residency at Glow in Washington D.C., and played across North America. He regularly appeared at Amnesia on the island of Ibiza, Balearic Islands, Spain. In October that year, van Buuren was voted number 5 in the DJ Mag.

In June 2003, van Buuren celebrated the 100th episode of A State of Trance at Bloomingdale, Bloemendaal aan Zee, Netherlands and released his debut studio album, 76, a 76-minute album divided into 13 tracks. In the same year he was voted No. 3 in the DJ Mag and held third place for the next two years (2004, 2005). Also in 2004, van Buuren remixed the 24 theme song into a trance hit.

=== 2005–2006: Shivers ===
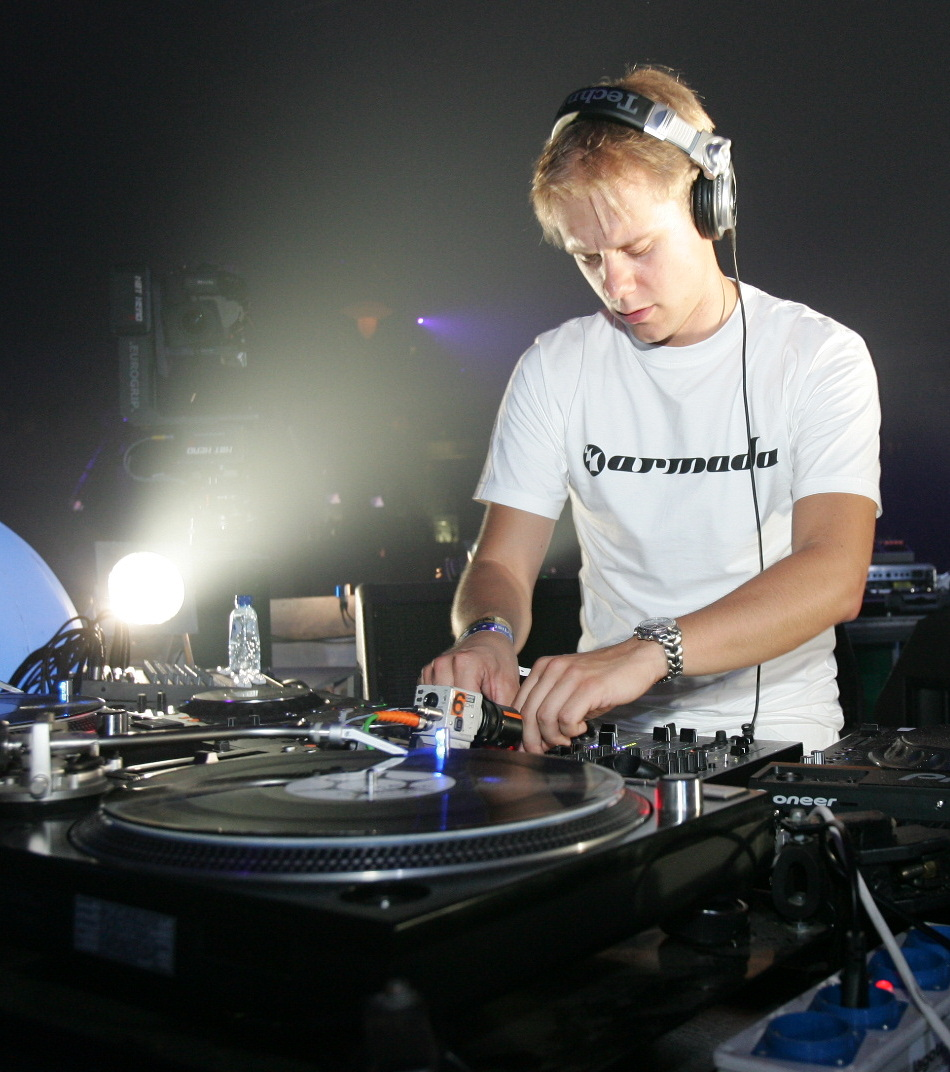
Armin van Buuren at Sensation White 2005

On 2 June 2005, he celebrated the 200th episode of A State of Trance at the Museumplein of Amsterdam. On 8 August 2005, van Buuren released his second studio album, Shivers. On the album van Buuren worked with artists such as Pakistani-American singer Nadia Ali, English singer Justine Suissa and American trance duo Gabriel & Dresden. On 25 May 2006, he celebrated with various artists the 250th episode of A State of Trance at Asta, The Hague, Netherlands. He was voted number two in the 2006 DJ Mag. On 17 May 2007, he celebrated with various artists the 300th episode of A State of Trance at Pettelaarse Schans, 's-Hertogenbosch, Netherlands.

=== 2007–2009: Imagine ===
Van Buuren was elected best DJ in the world in the 2007 DJ Mag edition. On 12 January 2008, van Buuren was given the "Buma Cultuur Pop Award," the most prestigious Dutch music award. On 17 April 2008, van Buuren released his third studio album, Imagine. It features collaboration with singers such as Jacqueline Govaert of Krezip. The album debuted at number one on the Dutch Albums Chart. The second single released from the album, "In and Out of Love", featuring Sharon den Adel from the band Within Temptation, has spawned a music video that has been viewed over 304 million times on YouTube. Since the release of Imagine, van Buuren has been working with Benno de Goeij of Rank 1 on solo productions and remixes. On 1 May 2008, he celebrated with various artists the 350th episode of A State of Trance at Noxx, Antwerp, Belgium. He was voted No. 1 in the 2008 DJ Mag again.

He collaborated with his brother, guitarist Eller van Buuren, at Together As One in Los Angeles, U.S., on New Year's Eve 2009, as well as on Armin's 2008 studio album Imagine. His performance with his brother at Together As One was also the last event of his Armin Only: Imagine world tour. To celebrate the 400th episode of A State of Trance, he performed at three shows with various artists in April, 2009 at Club Butan, Wuppertal, Germany, AIR, Birmingham, United Kingdom and Maassilo, Rotterdam, Netherlands.

Also in 2009, Foreign Media Games announced the production of Armin van Buuren: In the Mix, a music video game being produced in collaboration with Cloud 9 Music and van Buuren's Armada Music label. The title was released on 12 November 2010 exclusively for the Wii console. He was voted number one DJ in the 2009 DJ Mag for the third consecutive year.

=== 2010–2012: Mirage and appointment to the Order of Orange-Nassau ===
On 3 March 2010, van Buuren was awarded with the Golden Harp for his musical work and contribution to Dutch music, by Buma/Stemra at the 2010 Buma Harpen Gala in Hilversum, Netherlands. To celebrate the 450th episode of A State of Trance, he performed with various artists at five shows across two continents. The locations were: The Guvernment, Toronto, Canada on 1 April 2010, Roseland Ballroom, New York City on 2 April and on 3 April again, Expo Arena, Bratislava, Slovakia on 9 April and Centennial Hall, Wrocław, Poland on 24 April.

On 23 June 2010, it was announced that van Buuren's fourth studio album, Mirage was due to be released on 10 September. The first single "Full Focus", was released through iTunes Store on 24 June. The song peaked at number 60 in the Netherlands. One of the confirmed tracks from the album is a collaboration with English singer Sophie Ellis-Bextor called "Not Giving Up on Love", which was released as a single from Bextor's fourth studio album, Make a Scene. Armin also wrote a song for English singer Seal, but due to the release of his greatest hits album, Hits, the collaboration never came together. On 12 September 2010, van Buuren launched "A State of Sundays", a new weekly 24-hour radio show aired on Sirius XM Radio. On 20 October 2010, van Buuren won the award for Most Popular International DJ presented by The Golden Gnomes. A week later he was announced, for the fourth year running, as the number one DJ in DJ Mag.

The 2010 edition of Armin Only: Mirage kicked off in November 2010, in Utrecht, Netherlands, and was followed by shows in Saint Petersburg, Kyiv, Buenos Aires, Melbourne, Beirut, Poznań, Moscow and Bratislava.

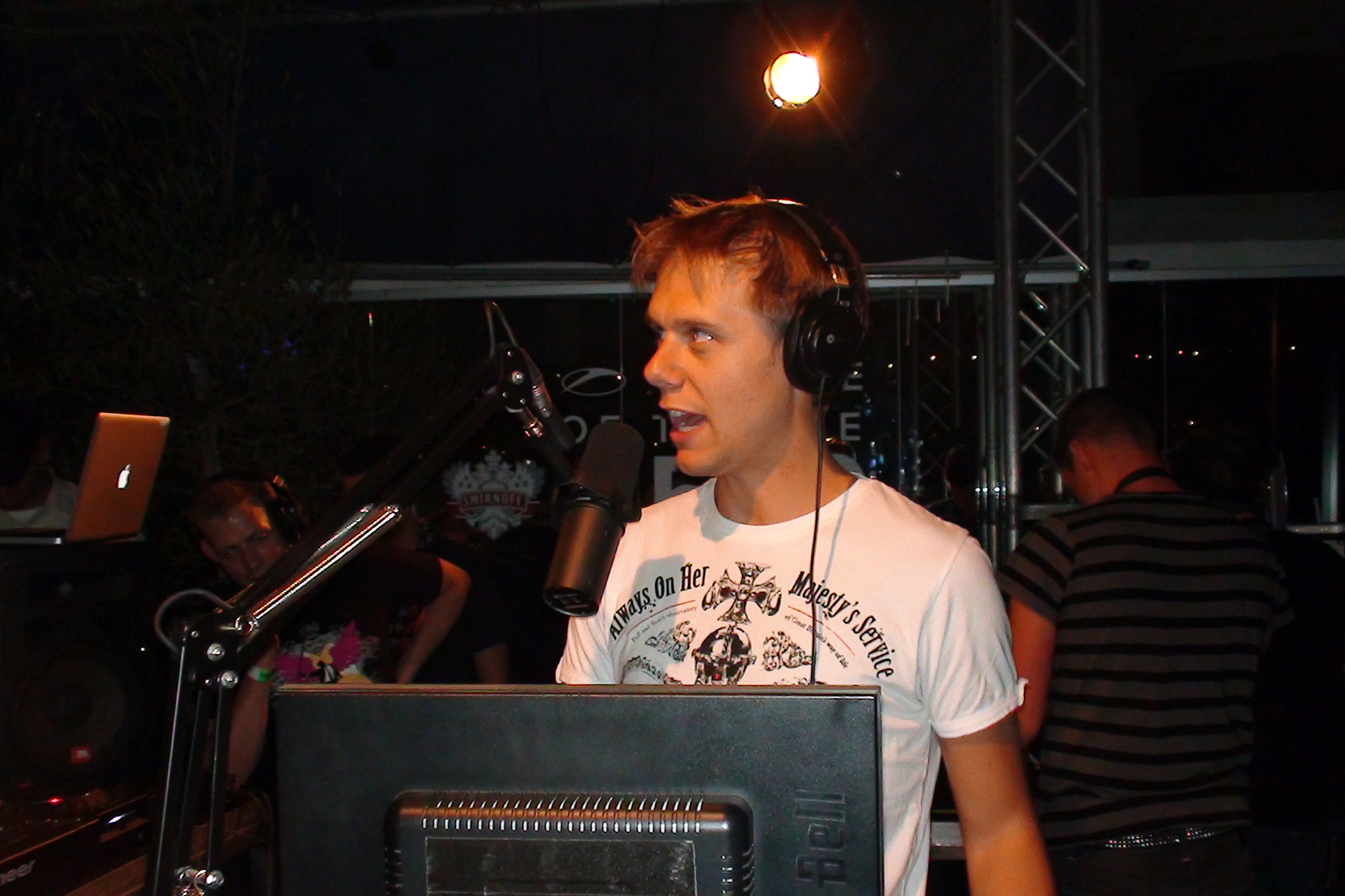
Van Buuren broadcasting the milestone 500th episode of his A State of Trance show at the official pre-party, live from Club Trinity in Cape Town on 17 March 2011

In March and April 2011, celebrating the 500th episode of his radio show, van Buuren performed five live shows along with various artists; the first was in Johannesburg, South Africa at MTN Expo Centre, and the second in Miami's Ultra Music Festival. He then performed in Argentina at GEBA in Buenos Aires, followed by a large event at Brabanthallen in Den Bosch, Netherlands which included more than 30 DJs from countries all over the world and was attended by over 30,000 people. The final show was held in Sydney on 16 April at Acer Arena. In 2011, van Buuren was appointed Officer of the Order of Oranje-Nassau for services to Dutch dance and music economy. That year he also received the Key to (Freedom) of Leiden from the City Mayor, as well as being voted No. 2 in the 2011 DJ Mag.

To celebrate the 550th episode of A State of Trance, he performed with various artists on two different continents during fourth weeks. The show was called A State of Trance 550: Invasion. The first event was celebrated at Ministry of Sound in London on 1 March 2012. On 7 March, Moscow held the second event at Expocentre. Kyiv's show was performed at International Exhibition Centre on 10 March. On 17 March, as part of the Beyond Wonderland festival in Los Angeles and on 25 March at the Ultra Music Festival in Miami. On 31 March, the biggest and final edition of ASOT 550 took place in the Brabanthallen of Den Bosch, Netherlands. On 19 October 2012, van Buuren was announced for a fifth non-consecutive year as the world's number one DJ according to DJ Mag.

To celebrate the 600th episode of A State of Trance, van Buuren announced that he would perform with various artists all around the world in early 2013. The show was called A State of Trance 600: The Expedition. It was announced that the show would tour the world, including stops in Madrid, Mexico City, São Paulo, Minsk, Sofia, Beirut, Kuala Lumpur, Mumbai, Miami, Guatemala City, New York City, and Den Bosch.

=== 2013–2014: Intense ===
The first single of van Buuren's fifth studio album, Intense, titled "This Is What It Feels Like", featured Canadian singer and songwriter Trevor Guthrie, and was released on 5 April 2013. The single nominated for a Grammy Award for Best Dance Recording. The tour for the album, Armin Only: Intense, was announced on 17 October 2013.

30 April 2013 saw the abdication of Queen Beatrix of the Netherlands in favor of her son, King Willem-Alexander of the Netherlands, who was sworn in and inaugurated that day, which was Queen's Day as well. Van Buuren was the headline act in a performance to a live audience celebrating the King's crowning in Amsterdam. While he was performing live together with the Royal Concertgebouw Orchestra in the Amsterdam Harbor on Java-eiland, King Willem-Alexander, Queen Máxima and their three daughters made an unplanned visit on stage.

On 19 October 2013, van Buuren was ranked number two DJ in the world by DJ Mag. On 26 January 2014, Armin van Buuren attended the 56th Grammy Awards, in relation to his Grammy Award nomination for the single featuring Trevor Guthrie, "This Is What It Feels Like" in the category of Best Dance Recording.

=== 2015–2018: Embrace ===
Van Buuren's DJ logo, used in shows as of 2015

On 8 May 2015, van Buuren released the first single from his sixth studio album, Embrace, which was released on 29 October 2015. The single is titled "Another You" featuring Mr Probz. Three weeks after releasing "Another You", van Buuren also debuted another remix from Game of Thrones official theme which is originally made by composer Ramin Djawadi.

On 16 October 2015 he released the next single from Embrace called "Strong Ones" featuring Cimo Fränkel. This was followed by the release of his collaboration with Cosmic Gate "Embargo" on 22 October 2015. To accompany the album's release, van Buuren announced the return of the Armin Only series of parties.

This edition of the tour was titled Armin Only: Embrace and took place throughout both 2015 and 2016. As the title of the tour suggests, it was based around the collection of music that he showcased on his new album.

On 2 February 2017, van Buuren officially opened a new A State of Trance radio show studio in Amsterdam as part of his celebrations for the 800th episode of the radio show. The studio is located in the Armada headquarters. With the new accommodations made possible by the studio, he introduced a new segment of the radio show called Service for Dreamers where he invites fans to send in their favorite trance tracks that have a special meaning to them. Every week one track gets chosen to be featured live on the show and introduced by the fans of the radio show live, either by a walk-in, phone call, Skype or other means of contact.

In 2017, van Buuren announced he will be releasing an online MasterClass sharing his expertise in electronic music production. On 13 April 2017, Armin van Buuren performed at the Heineken stage in Shanghai, in the first Formula 1 Festival along with Angela Zhang.

Van Buuren performed a seven-hour-long set at the Romania Untold Festival on 6 August 2018, clocking from 2:00 a.m. to after 9:00 a.m. This outlasted his previous 2017 ASOT performance, which had gone on for five hours.

=== 2019–2022: Balance ===
On 6 October 2019, van Buuren performed at Republic Square, Yerevan, Armenia as an opening act for the World Congress on Information Technology (WCIT).

On 25 October 2019, he released his seventh studio album, Balance.

In January 2021, van Buuren celebrated the 1000th episode of A State of Trance with a 7-day long livestream, where he, co-host Ruben de Ronde and monthly show resident Ferry Corsten presented a list of the top 1000 songs played during A State of Trance radio shows, as voted on by listeners of the show. The livestream ran from January 14 to January 21, and the top song was Shivers, from Armin's 2005 album. As has been done for previous radio show milestones, a major ASOT1000 festival was planned in Utrecht, but due to the COVID-19 pandemic, it has since been repeatedly delayed. The festival was held on March 4-5, 2023, by which point the weekly radio show have already surpassed 1100 episodes.

=== 2023–2025: Feel Again, Breathe and Piano ===
On 31 March 2023, van Buuren released his eighth studio album, Feel Again. The album contains 34 tracks across three parts and includes collaborations with artists including R3hab, Owl City, Matoma, Teddy Swims, Gareth Emery, JC Stewart, Cosmic Gate and Diane Warren. The album's release was led by "On & On", a collaboration with British duo Punctual and singer-songwriter Alika. Jake Appelman of EDM Identity wrote that the album demonstrated van Buuren's artistic versatility and highlighted its range of collaborators.

In 2023, the concert film and documentary Armin van Buuren Presents This is Me: Feel Again was released. The film combines footage from van Buuren's Ziggo Dome show with documentary interviews about his personal and professional life.

On 12 January 2024, van Buuren released Breathe In, the first part of his ninth studio album project. Breathe Out, the second and final part of the project, was announced for release on 27 June 2025. The full album, Breathe, was released on 27 June 2025 by Armada Music and contains 51 tracks, with collaborations including David Guetta, Bon Jovi, Moby, Alok, Pendulum, Rob Swire, Oliver Heldens, Gryffin, Hardwell and W&W. In the same year, he rose to number five in the DJ Mag Top 100 DJs poll and received the magazine's Outstanding Contribution award.

On 31 October 2025, van Buuren released Piano, his first acoustic album. The album consists of 15 self-composed piano pieces and was initially made available exclusively on Apple Music and Apple Music Classical for one week before its wider release. Van Buuren said that the album was his most personal record to date, with each piece recorded in one take in Dolby Atmos. In an interview with Apple Music 1's Zane Lowe, he described piano performance as giving him a creative freedom different from working with a sequencer.

== Discography ==
- 76 (2003)
- Shivers (2005)
- Imagine (2008)
- Mirage (2010)
- Intense (2013)
- Embrace (2015)
- Balance (2019)
- Feel Again (2023)
- Breathe (2025)
- Piano (2025)

== Filmography ==
Documentary and concert films

- This Is Me (2023) - Co-directed by Sander Reneman, Nicolas Caeyers, and James Barnes, 'This Is Me' is an "exploration of the creative process" behind the concert, as well surveying "Armin’s journey of self-discovery to connect with himself and others again".

== Orders ==
In 2011, van Buuren was appointed Officer of the Order of Orange Nassau for his services to music.

== Notes ==
Awards and achievements
Preceded by Erol Alkan	Mixmag Number 1 DJ; 2007	Succeeded by Tiësto
Preceded by Paul van Dyk	DJ Mag Number 1 DJ; 2007–2010; 2012	Succeeded by David Guetta
Preceded by David Guetta	DJ Mag Number 1 DJ; 2007–2010; 2012	Succeeded by Hardwell
