= Andrew Bayer discography =

- Studio albums: 6
- EPs: 7
- Singles: 42
- Music videos: 8
- Compilation albums: 3
- Remixes: 24

This is the discography of American DJ and producer Andrew Bayer. Bayer has released six studio albums, six extended plays, 30 singles, 12 remixes, and eight music videos. Under Artificial, he has released two singles. Under Signalrunners, Bayer has released one extended play, 10 singles, and 12 remixes.

== Studio albums ==
Title	Details	Peak chart positions
Title	Details	US Dance
It's Artificial	Released: July 25, 2011; Label: Anjunabeats; Format: Digital download, CD	—
If It Were You, We'd Never Leave	Released: April 22, 2013; Label: Anjunabeats; Format: Digital download, CD	19
In My Last Life	Released: August 24, 2018; Label: Anjunabeats; Format: Digital download, CD	—
In My Next Life	Released: April 12, 2019; Label: Anjunabeats; Format: Digital download	—
Duality (Part One)	Released: August 12, 2022; Label: Anjunabeats; Format: Digital download	—
Duality (Part Two)	Released: October 28, 2022; Label: Anjunabeats; Format: Digital download	—
A Light That Guides Weary Travelers Home	Released: September 4, 2026; Label: Ophelia Records	—
"—" denotes an album that did not chart or was not released.

== Compilation albums ==
Title	Details
Anjunabeats pres. Andrew Bayer 01	Released: August 21, 2012; Label: Anjunabeats; Format: Digital download, CD
Andrew Bayer Presents: 20 Years of Anjunabeats	Released: November 26, 2020; Label: Anjunabeats; Format: Digital download
Selected Works 2008 - 2020	Released: April 22, 2022; Label: Anjunabeats; Format: Digital download

== Extended plays ==
=== As lead artist ===
Title	Details	Peak chart positions
Title	Details	US Dance
By All Means / So It Goes (with Boom Jinx)	Released: April 13, 2010; Label: Anjunadeep; Format: Digital download	—
The Taxi Driver	Released: August 3, 2010; Label: Anjunadeep; Format: Digital download	—
Distractions	Released: February 8, 2011; Label: Anjunadeep; Format: Digital download	—
You / Community / Brick	Released: March 26, 2012; Label: Anjunadeep; Format: Digital download	—
Do Androids Dream	Released: April 13, 2015; Label: Anjunabeats; Format: Digital download	11
Anamnesis	Released: December 4, 2015; Label: Anjunabeats; Format: Digital download	—
Only You Boy / Eight to Sixteen	Released: May 24, 2019; Label: Anjunabeats; Format: Digital download	—
Parallels	Released: October 25, 2019; Label: Anjunabeats; Format: Digital download	—
"—" denotes an extended play that did not chart or was not released.

=== As Signalrunners ===
Title	Details
Don't Look Back / One Last Look	Released: October 1, 2007; Label: Anjunabeats; Format: Digital download

== Singles ==
=== As lead artist ===
List of singles, showing year released and album name
Title	Year	Album
"To The Six" (with Boom Jinx)	2009	Anjunabeats Volume 7
"Keyboard Cowboys" (with Boom Jinx)	2010	Anjunabeats Volume 8
"The Emergency" (with BT)	2010	These Hopeful Machines
"Fracture" (with Boom Jinx)	2010	Anjunabeats Worldwide 03
"Quadcore" (with Boom Jinx vs. Trifonic and Matt Lange)	2010	Anjunabeats presents Andrew Bayer 01
"Counting The Points"	2011	It's Artificial
"From The Earth"	2011	It's Artificial
"In And Out Of Phase" (with Matt Lange featuring Kerry Leva)	2012	Anjunabeats Volume 9
"Keep Your Secrets" (featuring Molly Bancroft)	2012	Anjunabeats Volume 9
"Monolith / Polylith"	2012	Non-album single
"Gaff's Eulogy"	2012	If It Were You, We'd Never Leave
"Lose Sight" (featuring Ane Brun)	2013	If It Were You, We'd Never Leave
"Need Your Love"	2013	If It Were You, We'd Never Leave
"Need Your Love / England / Detuned"	2013	Non-album singles
"Perth / Mirth Mobile"	2013	Non-album singles
"Once Lydian"	2014	Non-album singles
"Bullet Catch"	2014	Non-album singles
"The District"	2014	Anjunabeats Volume 11
"Super Human" (featuring Asbjørn)	2015	Do Androids Dream EP
"Nobody Told Me"	2015	Anamnesis EP
"Celestial"	2015	Anamnesis EP
"Memories"	2015	Anamnesis EP
"Follow The Light" (with Arty)	2016	Anjunabeats Worldwide 06
"From The Past"	2016	Anjunabeats Volume 13
"Destiny" (with Ilan Bluestone)	2017	Anjunabeats Volume 13
"Signs Of The Fall" (featuring Alison May)	2017	Non-album single
"Immortal Lover" (featuring Alison May)	2018	In My Last Life
"Your Eyes" (featuring Ane Brun)	2018	In My Last Life
"End of All Things" (featuring Alison May)	2018	In My Last Life
"Open End Resource" (featuring Alison May)	2018	In My Last Life
"Hold on to You" (featuring Ane Brun)	2019	In My Last Life
"Magitek"	2019	Anjunabeats Volume 14
"True Feelin'"	2019	Parallels
"Bottle Top Trance"	2019	Parallels
"Black & Blue" (with Ilan Bluestone)	2020	Non-album single
"The Launch" (with Cosmic Gate)	2020	Anjunabeats Volume 15
"The Test" (with Genix)	2020	Anjunabeats Volume 15
"Returning To You" (with Seven Lions featuring Alison May)	2021	Non-album single

=== As Artificial ===
List of singles, showing year released and album name
Title	Year	Album
"Prototype"	2013	Non-album singles
"Stuck In Sa Calenta"	2014	Non-album singles

=== As Signalrunners ===
List of singles, showing year released and album name
Title	Year	Album
"Breathe / Recoil"	2004	Non-album singles
"Backfire"	2005	Non-album singles
"3000 Miles Away"	2005	Non-album singles
"Love Theme Dusk" (with Mike Foyle)	2005	Non-album singles
"Space Dusk Theme" (with Mike Foyle presents Statica)	2006	Non-album singles
"Corrupted"	2006	Non-album singles
"Aria Epica"	2006	Anjunabeats Volume 4
"Electric Sheep"	2008	Non-album single
"These Shoulders" (with Julie Thompson)	2008	Anjunabeats Volume 6
"Meet Me In Montauk"	2008	Anjunabeats Volume 6

== Remixes ==
=== As lead artist ===
List of remixes, showing year released and original artists
Title	Year	Original artist(s)
"I Want You" (Andrew Bayer Remix)	2009	Dean Coleman (featuring DCLA)
"Secret" (Andrew Bayer Remix)	2009	OceanLab
"Alquimia" (Andrew Bayer Remix)	2010	Parker & Hanson
"Fish" (Boom Jinx and Andrew Bayer Remix)	2011	Steve Duda
"Rift" (Andrew Bayer Remix)	2011	Matt Lange
"Prelude" (Andrew Bayer and James Grant Remix)	2012	Above & Beyond
"Irminsul, Le Pilier Du Monde" (Andrew Bayer Remix)	2012	Damabiah
"Take Me Away" (Andrew Bayer and James Grant Remix)	2012	Full Tilt
"Gravity" (Andrew Bayer and James Grant Remix)	2012	P.O.S.
"Green and Blue" (Andrew Bayer Remix)	2012	Neil Davidge
"It's Cool" (Andrew Bayer and James Grant Remix)	2013	The Presets
"Strange World" (Andrew Bayer Remix)	2016	Push
"Fire Wire" (Andrew Bayer Remix)	2019	Cosmic Gate

=== As Signalrunners ===
List of remixes, showing year released and original artists
Title	Year	Original artist(s)
"Flood Warning" (Signalrunners Remix)	2006	Altitude
"Dynamica" (Signalrunners Remix)	2007	Chris Chambers and Static Blue
"There's Always Music" (Signalrunners Remix)	2007	Pax Royale
"Things I Never Tell You" (Signalrunners Remix)	2007	Joni
"Chicago" (Signalrunners Remix) Unreleased due to copyright issues, but played in several Above & Beyond's "Trance Around The World" episodes	2007	Sufjan Stevens
"Without Love" (Signalrunners Remix)	2007	Judge Jules
"By My Side" (Signalrunners Club Mix)	2007	Summer Sessions (featuring Tiff Lacey)
"Fly To Colors" (Signalrunners Remix)	2007	Markus Schulz
"With Me" (Signalrunners Club Mix)	2007	Matt Cerf and Eric Meza (featuring Jaren)
"Beautiful Together" (Signalrunners Perfect Century Remix)	2008	OceanLab
"Waves" (Signalrunners Remix)	2008	Nitrous Oxide
"Restless" (Signalrunners Remix)	2009	Oliver Smith
"Angel Falls" (Signalrunners Fierce Remix)	2011	Lange

== Music videos ==
List of music videos, showing year released and directors
Title	Year	Director(s)
"The Emergency" (with BT)	2010	Nicolas Vantomme
"From The Earth"	2011	Damien Wasylki
"Lose Sight" (featuring Ane Brun)	2013	Człowiek Kamera
"Need Your Love"	2013	Michal Bolland
"Super Human" (featuring Asbjørn)	2015	Robin Lochmann
"Immortal Lover" (featuring Alison May)	2018	Vadim Stein
"Your Eyes" (featuring Ane Brun)	2018	Flat-e
"End Of All Things" (featuring Alison May)	2018	—
