= Anjunabeats Volume 7 =

Compilation album by Above & Beyond
- Released: 5 October 2009
- Genre: Trance, progressive trance, and progressive house
- Length: 79:57 (Disc one); 79:48 (Disc two)
- Label: Anjunabeats

Above & Beyond compilation chronology
Anjunabeats Volume Six (2008)	Anjunabeats Volume 7 (2009)	Anjunabeats Volume 8 (2010)

Anjunabeats Volume 7 is the seventh album in the Anjunabeats Volume compilation series mixed and compiled by British trance DJs Above & Beyond and released on 5 October 2009. Copies pre-ordered through Recordstore.co.uk were signed by the three members of Above & Beyond; Jono Grant, Tony McGuinness and Paavo Siljamäki.

== Track listing ==
Disc one
No.	Title	Writer(s)	Artist	Length
1.	"Pink Houses (Vox-Dub Edit)"	Belinda Frank, Francesco D'Este, Ilich Molin, Wim Broersma	Answer42 featuring Belinda Frank	5:09
2.	"Milano"	James Cayzer, Øistein Johan Eide	Boom Jinx & Jaytech	4:07
3.	"To The Six"	Andrew Bayer, Øistein Johan Eide	Boom Jinx & Andrew Bayer	6:45
4.	"Pacific"	Oliver Smith	Oliver Smith	6:29
5.	"Terminal 6"	Alfie Granger-Howell, Nick Harriman	Solarity	5:45
6.	"Tonight (Above & Beyond Mix)"	Ben Harris, J. Peake, Paul Harris, Steve Smith	Dirty Vegas	6:15
7.	"Call of Loneliness"	Andy Duguid	Reeves	5:57
8.	"Cadence"	Oliver Smith	Oliver Smith	4:54
9.	"Safe (Wherever You Are)"	Aruna Abrams, Elod Csaszar, Mario Egeto	Velvetine	4:41
10.	"Mount Everest (Dennis Sheperd Mix)"	Tobias Schuh	Cold Blue	4:55
11.	"Green Line"	Dima Petrisor	Anhken	5:51
12.	"Anjunabeach"	Jono Grant, Paavo Siljamäki, Tony McGuinness	Above & Beyond	6:32
13.	"Paper Jet (Bart Claessen Big Room Remix)"	Paul Keeley	Paul Keeley	6:47
14.	"Nuclear Fusion"	Matan Zohar	Mat Zo	5:45
Total length:				79:57

Disc two
No.	Title	Writer(s)	Artist	Length
1.	"Autumn"	Mike Koglin, Paavo Siljamäki	Mike Koglin vs. P.O.S.	5:46
2.	"Misgrey"	Levente Márton	Sunny Lax	5:29
3.	"Aurora (Sunny Lax Remix)"	Krzysztof Pretkiewicz	Nitrous Oxide	5:43
4.	"Default"	Matan Zohar	Mat Zo	5:13
5.	"Everywhere You Are"	Aruna Abrams, Mike Shiver	Mike Shiver & Aruna	6:41
6.	"Irufushi"	Janne Mansnerus, Miika Eloranta	Super8 & Tab	5:12
7.	"30 Degrees at Midnight"	Tobias Schuh	Cold Blue	5:12
8.	"Wanderlust"	Stuart Langelaan	Lange pres. Firewall	5:11
9.	"Moon Dust"	Krzysztof Pretkiewicz, Sebastian Adam Wichary	Nitrous Oxide & Adam Nickey	6:35
10.	"Callista (Stoneface & Terminal Mix)"	Sebastian Adam Wichary	Adam Nickey	4:41
11.	"Venice Beach"	Daniel Kandi	Daniel Kandi	5:22
12.	"Eclipse (Mat Zo Remix)"	Rob Stevenson	Activa presents Solar Movement	5:57
13.	"Fahrenheit"	Dan Stone	Dan Stone	6:02
14.	"Downhill"	Tobias Schuh	Cold Blue	6:37
Total length:				79:48
