= Anjunabeats Volume 12 =

Compilation album by Above & Beyond
- Released: 18 December 2015
- Genre: Trance, progressive trance, progressive house
- Label: Anjunabeats

Above & Beyond compilation chronology
Anjunabeats Volume 11 (2014)	Anjunabeats Volume 12 (2015)	Anjunabeats Volume 13 (2017)

Anjunabeats Volume 12 is the twelfth installment in the Anjunabeats Volume compilation series mixed and compiled by British trance group Above & Beyond. It was released on 18 December 2015 through Anjunabeats. It was Billboard's #4 Top Electronic Album and #45 Top Independent Album for 2016. MixMag rated the album 8/10.

== Track listing ==
Disc One
No.	Title	Artist	Length
1.	"X Machina" (Cubicolor Remix)	Howling	5:19
2.	"Circles"	Thomas Schwartz and Fausto Fanizza	3:21
3.	"Your Love"	Oliver Smith	3:21
4.	"Great Divide"	Jaytech	3:51
5.	"Got This Feeling" (Lane 8 Remix)	Cubicolor	3:50
6.	"Contrasts"	Vintage and Morelli	5:52
7.	"Wondering" (Club Mix)	Yotto and Caps	5:05
8.	"Revelation"	TP and Leu Leu Land	4:34
9.	"Smoke & Mirrors"	Jerome Isma-Ae, Alastor and London Thor	4:49
10.	"Counting Down The Days" (Yotto Mix)	Above & Beyond featuring Gemma Hayes	5:18
11.	"Wannamaker"	Spencer Brown	4:02
12.	"Bring Me Back Around"	Boom Jinx featuring Meredith Call	5:00
13.	"Memories"	Andrew Bayer	5:59
14.	"Bend Girl"	Kyau & Albert	4:14
15.	"Enceladus"	Sunny Lax	4:13
16.	"Treasure" (Kyau & Albert Remix)	Above & Beyond featuring Zoë Johnston	5:13
17.	"Frontier"	Jason Ross and Wrechiski	5:04

Disc Two
No.	Title	Artist	Length
1.	"Another Chance"	Above & Beyond presents OceanLab	3:09
2.	"Under Your Skin"	Grum featuring Rothchild	5:01
3.	"Mezzo Forte"	Nick Sember	3:38
4.	"Salva Mea 2.0" (Above & Beyond Remix)	Faithless	5:12
5.	"Zero Gravity" (Above & Beyond Remix)	Jean-Michel Jarre and Tangerine Dream	4:33
6.	"Out Of Time" (Above & Beyond Club Mix)	Above & Beyond	4:30
7.	"Kate" (2015 Remix)	Arty	3:04
8.	"Fly To New York" (Above & Beyond Vs Jason Ross Club Mix)	Above & Beyond featuring Zoë Johnston	3:30
9.	"Black Water"	Genix and Sunny Lax	4:14
10.	"Bigger Than Love"	Ilan Bluestone featuring Giuseppe De Luca	5:06
11.	"About The Sun"	Kyau & Albert	3:59
12.	"Mirage"	Oliver Smith	4:13
13.	"A.I."	Above & Beyond	5:08
14.	"Celestial"	Andrew Bayer	5:57
15.	"Shake The Air"	Ilan Bluestone, Maor Levi and Jeza	4:34
16.	"Little Something" (Super8 & Tab Remix)	Above & Beyond featuring Justine Suissa	4:26
17.	"Nobody Told Me"	Andrew Bayer	5:03
18.	"Alone Tonight" (Jason Ross Remix)	Above & Beyond	3:56

== Release history ==
Region	Date	Label	Format	Catalog
United Kingdom	18 December 2015	Anjunabeats	CD	ANJCD047
