= Anjunabeats Volume 6 =

Anjunabeats Volume Six

Compilation album by Above & Beyond
- Released: 6 October 2008
- Genre: Trance, progressive trance, progressive house
- Length: 79:20 (Disc one); 79:55 (Disc two)
- Label: Anjunabeats

Above & Beyond chronology
| Sirens of the Sea (2008) | Anjunabeats Volume Six (2008) | Anjunadeep:01 (2009) |

Above & Beyond compilation chronology
| Anjunabeats Volume 5 (2007) | Anjunabeats Volume 6 (2008) | Anjunabeats Volume 7 (2009) |

Anjunabeats Volume Six is the sixth album in the Anjunabeats Volume compilation series mixed and compiled by British trance group Above & Beyond released on 6 October 2008.

The digital download version was released on 6 April 2009 and contains the individual songs listed.

== Track listing ==
Disc 1
| No. | Title | Writer(s) | Artist | Length |
|---|---|---|---|---|
| 1. | "Paper Jet" | Paul Keeley | Paul Keeley | 6:20 |
| 2. | "Professional Killers" | Erkka Lempiäinen, Matti Heininen | Komytea | 3:15 |
| 3. | "A Sort of Homecoming" (Michael Cassette Remix) | Paul Keeley | Paul Keeley | 4:29 |
| 4. | "Meet Me in Montauk" | Andrew Bayer, Alan Nimmo | Signalrunners | 6:43 |
| 5. | "Cocktail Bar" | Joonas Hahmo | Joonas Hahmo | 5:03 |
| 6. | "My Personal Summer" | Vladimir Ershov | Proff | 5:48 |
| 7. | "Groove Nova" (Oliver Smith Tech Mix) | James Cayzer | Jaytech | 6:25 |
| 8. | "Do Not Cross" | Johan Vermeulen | Johan Vermeulen | 3:49 |
| 9. | "Pyramid (Dinka Mix)" | James Cayzer | Jaytech | 4:09 |
| 10. | "Fake Awake" | Andy Moor | Andy Moor | 5:55 |
| 11. | "Lights over Austin" | Chad Cisneros, Dave Reed | Tritonal | 4:39 |
| 12. | "Not a Lot Left" | Elod Csaszar, Mario Egeto | Myon & Shane 54 | 5:51 |
| 13. | "Horizons" | Oliver Smith | Oliver Smith | 3:39 |
| 14. | "Tampere By Night" | Joonas Hahmo | Joonas Hahmo | 4:02 |
| 15. | "Defined" | Matan Zohar | Mat Zo | 5:20 |
| 16. | "Restless" | Oliver Smith | Oliver Smith | 3:54 |
| Total length: | | | | 79:20 |

Disc 2
| No. | Title | Writer(s) | Artist | Length |
|---|---|---|---|---|
| 1. | "These Shoulders" (Club Mix) | Julie Thompson, Andrew Bayer, Alan Nimmo | Signalrunners and Julie Thompson | 5:35 |
| 2. | "City Lights" | Przemyslaw Pawelski | Sundriver | 5:16 |
| 3. | "Sunrise" | Oliver Smith, Øistein Johan Eide | Boom Jinx and Oliver Smith | 6:27 |
| 4. | "Shift" | Sebastian Adam Wichary | Adam Nickey | 4:49 |
| 5. | "The Last Time" | Kathleen Fisher, Ron Wasserman, Steve Helstrip | Thrillseekers featuring Fisher | 6:42 |
| 6. | "Elektra" | Janne Mansnerus, Miika Eloranta | Super8 & Tab | 4:27 |
| 7. | "Breaking Ties" (Above & Beyond's Analogue Haven Remix) | Jono Grant, Justine Suissa, Paavo Siljamäki, Tony McGuinness | OceanLab | 6:05 |
| 8. | "Show Me" | Krzysztof Pretkiewicz | Nitrous Oxide | 6:04 |
| 9. | "Slider" | Sebastian Adam Wichary | Adam Nickey | 5:35 |
| 10. | "Let Go" | Daniel Kandi, Daniel Neumann | Kandi and Neumann | 4:47 |
| 11. | "Cirrus" | Oliver Smith | Oliver Smith | 5:33 |
| 12. | "Delusion" | Janne Mansnerus, Miika Eloranta | Super8 & Tab featuring Alyna | 5:33 |
| 13. | "Madness" (I Prefer This Mix) | Bart Claessen, Dave Schiemann | Bart Claessen and Dave Schiemann | 5:59 |
| 14. | "Miracle" (Above & Beyond Club Mix) | Jono Grant, Justine Suissa, Paavo Siljamäki, Tony McGuinness | OceanLab | 7:05 |
| Total length: | | | | 79:55 |
