= Anjunabeats Volume 5 =

Anjunabeats Volume Five
- Cover art depicting Above & Beyond and a Anjunabeats logo on Mount Rushmore

Compilation album by Above & Beyond
- Released: 21 May 2007
- Genre: Trance, progressive trance, progressive house
- Label: Anjunabeats

Above & Beyond compilation chronology
Anjunabeats Volume Four (2006)	Anjunabeats Volume Five (2007)	Anjunabeats Volume Six (2008)

Anjunabeats Volume Five is the fifth album in the Anjunabeats Volume compilation series mixed and compiled by British trance group Above & Beyond, released on 21 May 2007.

== Track listing ==
Disc 1
No.	Title	Artist	Length
1.	"Zeppelin"	Michael Cassette	5:00
2.	"Battery Life"	Chunk & Twist	4:56
3.	"Essence"	Jaytech	6:08
4.	"Remember September"	Boom Jinx feat. Thomas J. Bergersen	6:40
5.	"Together"	Joonas Hahmo	6:10
6.	"Needs to Feel (Wippenberg Remix)"	Super8 & Tab	6:37
7.	"Spacelift"	Jaytech	5:02
8.	"My Name is Jacques"	Junk Science	4:55
9.	"Formalistick"	Stephen J. Kroos	4:10
10.	"Buzz"	Above & Beyond presents Tranquility Base	6:24
11.	"Tomahawk"	Oliver Smith	5:24
12.	"Amnesia"	Nitrous Oxide	5:08
13.	"Good For Me (Above & Beyond Club Mix)"	Above & Beyond featuring Zoë Johnston	7:54

Disc 2
No.	Title	Artist	Length
1.	"Shapes"	Maor Levi	6:14
2.	"Megashira"	Marc Marberg with Kyau & Albert	5:04
3.	"One Night in Tokyo (DJ Shah's Savanah Remix)"	Purple Mood	8:28
4.	"Razorfish (Bart Claessen 2007 Rework)"	Above & Beyond presents Tranquility Base	6:09
5.	"Make Me Believe"	Daniel Kandi	5:23
6.	"Home (Above & Beyond Club Mix)"	Above & Beyond	7:00
7.	"Nimbus"	Oliver Smith	5:21
8.	"Oceanic"	Above & Beyond presents Tranquility Base	4:10
9.	"Worldwide"	Mark Pledger vs. Super8 & Tab	4:52
10.	"Cold Front (Bart Claessen Remix)"	Remo-Con	7:10
11.	"Never Gone (Above & Beyond Respray)"	Adam Nickey	7:02
12.	"One Wish"	Evbointh	4:58
13.	"Suru"	Super8 & Tab	7:54
