= Anjunabeats Worldwide 03 =

Compilation album by Arty and Daniel Kandi
- Released: 11 April 2011
- Genre: Trance, progressive trance
- Label: Anjunabeats

Anjunabeats compilation chronology
Anjunadeep:03 (2011)	Anjunabeats Worldwide 03 (2011)	Anjunabeats Volume 9 (2011)

Anjunabeats Worldwide chronology
Anjunabeats Worldwide 02 (2010)	Anjunabeats Worldwide 03 (2011)	Anjunabeats Worldwide 04 (2012)

Anjunabeats Worldwide 03 is the third compilation album in the Anjunabeats Worldwide compilation series. It was released in April 2011 on Anjunabeats. The album is mixed and compiled by Russian trance producer Arty and Danish trance producer Daniel Kandi. The compilation is named after the radio show of the same name, which airs every Sunday evening on the internet radio Digitally Imported.

== Track listing ==
Disc one: Mixed by Arty
No.	Title	Artist	Length
1.	"My Enemy" (Rank 1 Remix)	Super8 & Tab feat. Julie Thompson
2.	"Rebound"	Arty & Mat Zo
3.	"Lifted" (Mat Zo Remix)	Tritonal feat. Cristina Soto
4.	"Sun 2011" (4 Strings Remix)	Slusnik Luna
5.	"Downforce" (Mike Shiver's Garden State Mix)	Nitrous Oxide
6.	"Out Of This World" (Mike Koglin Remix)	Sunny Lax & Solex
7.	"Zara"	Arty
8.	"Drive" (Save The Robot Remix)	Kenneth Thomas feat. Roberta Harrison & Steven Taetz
9.	"Superman"	Mat Zo
10.	"Fracture"	Boom Jinx & Andrew Bayer
11.	"Sandstone"	Rex Mundi
12.	"Electrify" (Lange Mix)	Lange & Fabio XB pres. Yves De Lacroix
13.	"Let Go" (Nic Chagall Remix)	Aruna with Mark Eteson
14.	"Synapse Dynamics" (Arty Remix)	Mat Zo
15.	"The Wall"	Arty feat. Tania Zygar

Disc two: Mixed by Daniel Kandi
No.	Title	Artist	Length
1.	"Alquimia" (Andrew Bayer Remix)	Parker & Hanson
2.	"Skydive" (Willem De Roo Remix)	Aiera
3.	"The Gift"	Norin & Rad vs. Recurve
4.	"Resolution" (Daniel Kandi's Solution Mix)	Aalto
5.	"Silver Sand" (Daniel Kandi Remix)	Edu & Cramp
6.	"Sunstar"	Mike Koglin
7.	"Don't Fix It"	Daniel Kandi & Phillip Alpha
8.	"Indigo" (Chris Melton Remix)	Activa pres. Solar Movement
9.	"Follow You" (Club Mix)	Nitrous Oxide
10.	"Just For You"	Daniel Kandi
11.	"Serano"	Adam Szabo
12.	"Dionysia"	Juventa
13.	"Soul Searchin'"	Daniel Kandi
14.	"The Man Who Knew Too Much"	Claessen & Martens
