= Anjunabeats Volume 8 =

Compilation album by Above & Beyond
- Released: 19 July 2010
- Genre: Trance, progressive trance, progressive house
- Label: Anjunabeats

Above & Beyond compilation chronology
Anjunabeats Volume 7 (2009)	Anjunabeats Volume 8 (2010)	Anjunabeats Volume 9 (2011)

Anjunabeats Volume 8 is the eighth album in the Anjunabeats Volume compilation series mixed and compiled by British trance group Above & Beyond. It was released in the United Kingdom on 19 July 2010 by Anjunabeats. The compilation peaked at number five on the Dance Albums Chart in the UK.

== Track listing ==
Disc one
No.	Title	Artist	Length
1.	"Alquimia"	Parker & Hanson	3:12
2.	"Stranded in NYC"	Duderstadt	4:11
3.	"Let Go"	Aruna & Mark Eteson	5:10
4.	"Chordplay"	Oliver Smith	4:39
5.	"Keyboard Cowboys"	Boom Jinx & Andrew Bayer	5:52
6.	"Anphonic"	Above & Beyond vs. Kyau & Albert	5:05
7.	"Rush"	Arty	4:49
8.	"Chasing Love"	Maor Levi feat. Ashley Tomberlin	6:30
9.	"Black Is the New Yellow"	Super8 & Tab feat. Anton Sonin	5:46
10.	"From the Earth" (Breakfast Remix)	Andrew Bayer	6:57
11.	"90 Nights of Summer"	Bart Claessen	6:28
12.	"On a Good Day (Metropolis)"	Above & Beyond & Gareth Emery pres. OceanLab	6:18
13.	"Seven Years"	Thomas Datt pres. Asedo	5:40
14.	"Piece of Me"	Daniel Kandi	6:07

Disc two
No.	Title	Artist	Length
1.	"A Farewell (Intro Edit)"	Andrew Bayer	2:01
2.	"The Taxi Driver"	Andrew Bayer	6:04
3.	"The Wonder"	Arty	5:19
4.	"Sushi"	7 Skies	5:16
5.	"Live Forever" (Mat Zo Dub)	Lange feat. Emma Hewitt	5:38
6.	"We.Are"	Who.Is	5:28
7.	"Thing Called Love" (Club Mix)	Above & Beyond feat. Richard Bedford	5:41
8.	"Larry Mountains 54" (Juventa Remix)	David West feat. Andreas Hermansson	5:25
9.	"Altara"	Adam Nickey	5:51
10.	"Forgive Me"	Daniel Kandi	4:55
11.	"Mercy" (Extended Mix)	Super8 & Tab feat. Jan Burton	6:46
12.	"Alt+F4" (Dan Stone Remix)	Alt+F4	4:39
13.	"Dreamcatcher" (Club Mix)	Nitrous Oxide	5:34
14.	"Sky Falls Away"	OceanLab vs. Passive Progressive	5:07

iTunes bonus track
No.	Title	Artist	Length
1.	"Lonely Girl" (Mike Shiver's Catching Sun Mix)	Above & Beyond pres. OceanLab

== Charts ==
Chart (2010)	Peak position
UK Dance Albums	5

== Release history ==
Region	Date	Label	Format	Catalog
United Kingdom	19 July 2010	Anjunabeats	CD	ANJCD018
United States	20 July 2010	Ultra Records	CD	
Taiwan	16 July 2010	High Note Records	CD	
