= Anjunabeats Volume 9 =

Compilation album by Above & Beyond
- Released: 13 November 2011
- Genre: Trance, progressive trance, progressive house
- Label: Anjunabeats

Above & Beyond compilation chronology
| Anjunabeats Volume 8 (2010) | Anjunabeats Volume 9 (2011) | Anjunabeats Volume 10 (2013) |

Anjunabeats Volume 9 is the ninth instalment in the Anjunabeats Volume compilation series mixed and compiled by British trance group Above & Beyond. It was released in the United Kingdom on 13 November 2011 by Anjunabeats.

== Track listing ==
Disc One
| No. | Title | Artist | Length |
|---|---|---|---|
| 1. | "Tokyo" | Above & Beyond | 3:06 |
| 2. | "Afterthought" | Parker & Hanson | 5:43 |
| 3. | "Median" | Breakfast pres. Keyworth | 4:42 |
| 4. | "RU116" | Cramp | 6:36 |
| 5. | "In And Out of Phase" | Andrew Bayer & Matt Lange feat. Kerry Leva | 4:55 |
| 6. | "New Dawn" | Oliver Smith | 5:24 |
| 7. | "Bloom" | Norin & Rad | 5:23 |
| 8. | "Formula Rossa" | Above & Beyond | 6:58 |
| 9. | "On Our Own" | Maor Levi & Bluestone | 5:58 |
| 10. | "Higher State" | Genix | 6:04 |
| 11. | "Symmetry" | Oliver Smith | 5:20 |
| 12. | "You Got To Go" (Kyau & Albert Remix) | Above & Beyond | 5:19 |
| 13. | "Britanica" | Ost & Meyer | 6:18 |
| 14. | "Progress" | Oliver Smith | 6:27 |

Disc Two
| No. | Title | Artist | Length |
|---|---|---|---|
| 1. | "Electrified" (Mat Zo Electrofied Dub) | Tate & Diamond feat. Nicolai | 7:27 |
| 2. | "Bipolar" | Mat Zo | 4:40 |
| 3. | "Every Little Beat" (Myon & Shane 54 Summer of Love Mix) | Above & Beyond feat. Richard Bedford | 4:37 |
| 4. | "New Vibe" | Jaytech | 5:24 |
| 5. | "Keep Your Secrets" | Andrew Bayer feat. Molly Bancroft | 6:48 |
| 6. | "Kate" | Arty | 5:53 |
| 7. | "Overdrive" | Jaytech | 5:09 |
| 8. | "Slow To Learn" (Maor Levi Club Mix) | Super8 & Tab feat. Jan Burton | 5:59 |
| 9. | "iPeople" | Nitrous Oxide | 4:39 |
| 10. | "Frequency Flyer" | Mat Zo | 5:26 |
| 11. | "Mozart" | Arty & Mat Zo | 5:23 |
| 12. | "Catch The Eye" | Cramp | 4:22 |
| 13. | "Contrast" | Sunny Lax | 5:41 |
| 14. | "Dyno" | Mike Koglin vs. Genix | 6:21 |

iTunes Bonus Track
| No. | Title | Artist | Length |
|---|---|---|---|
| 1. | "Rebound" (Omnia Remix) | Arty & Mat Zo | 7:11 |

== Release history ==
| Region | Date | Label | Format | Catalog |
|---|---|---|---|---|
| United Kingdom | 13 November 2011 | Anjunabeats | CD | ANJCD028 |
