= Anjunabeats Volume 11 =

2014 music album

Compilation album by Above & Beyond
- Released: 9 June 2014
- Genre: Deep house → Progressive house (Disc 1) → Progressive trance (End of Disc 1 and Disc 2)
- Label: Anjunabeats

Above & Beyond compilation chronology
Anjunabeats Volume 10 (2013)	Anjunabeats Volume 11 (2014)	Anjunabeats Volume 12 (2015)

Anjunabeats Volume 11 is the eleventh installment in the Anjunabeats Volume compilation series mixed and compiled by British trance group Above & Beyond. It was released on 9 June 2014 by Anjunabeats.

Compared to previous compilations, Disc 1 features music more commonly associated with Above & Beyond's side label Anjunadeep. Overall, the album comprised trance, progressive house, deep house, and big room house songs from staple Anjunabeats artists including Maor Levi, Ilan Bluestone, and 16 Bit Lolitas.

== Track listing ==
Disc One
No.	Title	Artist	Length
1.	"You Would"	Thomas Schwartz and Fausto Fanizza
2.	"Wicked Game"	Betoko vs. Gemma Hayes
3.	"Beat Organ"	16 Bit Lolitas
4.	"Good For Me" (Matt Lange Remix)	Above & Beyond
5.	"Gravity"	Parker & Hanson
6.	"Boy" (Spada Remix)	Emma Louise
7.	"Staccato"	Matt Lange
8.	"No One Gets Left Behind" (Konstantin Sibold Remix)	DJ Yellow, Flowers and Sea Creatures
9.	"Rediscovered"	Cid Inc.
10.	"Overture" (Guy J Remix)	Twice As Nice
11.	"The Dark"	Boom Jinx and Meredith Call
12.	"Gemini"	Soundprank
13.	"Dark & Long [Dark Train]" (Jerome Isma-Ae and Maor Levi Remix)	Underworld

Disc Two
No.	Title	Artist	Length
1.	"Tension"	ilan Bluestone and Jerome Isma-Ae
2.	"Anjunabeach" (Genix vs. Las Salinas Remix)	Above & Beyond
3.	"Hey Now" (Arty Remix)	London Grammar
4.	"Sticky Fingers"	Above & Beyond featuring Alex Vargas
5.	"Code Red"	Super8 & Tab vs. Jaytech
6.	"Pyramid Scheme" (Club Mix)	Mat Zo featuring Chuck D
7.	"Hindsight"	Audien
8.	"Karma"	Sunny Lax
9.	"Run"	Genix
10.	"Evermore"	Oliver Smith
11.	"On My Way To Mariana Heaven"	Above & Beyond featuring Richard Bedford
12.	"Spheres"	ilan Bluestone
13.	"Far From Needing Your Love"	Above & Beyond vs. Andrew Bayer
14.	"Hello"	Above & Beyond
15.	"Satellite" (ilan Bluestone Remix)	Above & Beyond presents OceanLab
16.	"The District"	Andrew Bayer

iTunes Bonus Track
No.	Title	Artist	Length
1.	"Liquid Love" (Maor Levi Remix)	Above & Beyond featuring Richard Bedford	8:23
2.	"Home" (Genix Remix)	Above & Beyond	7:36

== Release history ==
Region	Date	Label	Format	Catalog
United Kingdom	9 June 2014	Anjunabeats	CD	ANJCD038
