= Anjunabeats Volume 4 =

Anjunabeats Volume Four
- Cover art depicting Anjunabeats logo on a 'Hollywood' sign

Compilation album by Above & Beyond
- Released: 3 July 2006
- Genre: Trance, progressive trance
- Label: Anjunabeats

Above & Beyond compilation chronology
| Anjunabeats Volume Three (2005) | Anjunabeats Volume Four (2006) | Anjunabeats Volume Five (2007) |

Professional ratings
Review scores
| Source | Rating |
|---|---|
| AllMusic | 4.5/5 stars |

Anjunabeats Volume Four is the fourth album in the Anjunabeats Volume compilation series mixed and compiled by British trance group Above & Beyond released on 3 July 2006.

== Track listing ==
| No. | Title | Artist | Length |
|---|---|---|---|
| 1. | "Small Step On The Other Side (B.P.'s Volume Four Rework)" | Basic Perspective | 6:16 |
| 2. | "Come Play Perfect" | Boom Jinx | 5:30 |
| 3. | "5" | Super8 & P.O.S. presents Aalto | 5:47 |
| 4. | "Aria Epica" | Signalrunners | 5:14 |
| 5. | "Keep On (Komytea Remix)" | Supermodels From Paris | 4:59 |
| 6. | "Ultraviolet" | Mike Koglin vs. Mark Pledger | 4:44 |
| 7. | "Illumina" | Maor Levi | 4:57 |
| 8. | "North Pole" | Nitrous Oxide | 3:46 |
| 9. | "Amsterdam (Smith & Pledger Remix)" | Luminary | 6:35 |
| 10. | "Helsinki Scorchin'" | Super8 + DJ Tab | 4:41 |
| 11. | "Can't Sleep (Maori Remix)" | Above & Beyond | 5:25 |
| 12. | "Get Off" | Super8 | 7:12 |
| 13. | "White" | Smith & Pledger | 6:28 |
| 14. | "Breathe" | Daniel Kandi | 7:04 |
