= Anjunabeats Volume 13 =

Compilation album by Above & Beyond
- Released: 10 February 2017
- Genre: Trance, progressive trance, progressive house
- Label: Anjunabeats

Above & Beyond compilation chronology
Anjunabeats Volume 12 (2015)	Anjunabeats Volume 13 (2017)	Anjunabeats Volume 14 (2019)

Anjunabeats Volume 13 is the thirteenth installment in the Anjunabeats Volume compilation series mixed and compiled by British trance group Above & Beyond. It was released on 10 February 2017 through Anjunabeats.

== Track listing ==
Disc One
No.	Title	Artist	Length
1.	"Dead End Thrills" (Extended Mix)	Cubicolor	4:25
2.	"Need You"	Luttrell	4:07
3.	"Save Me" (Thomas Schwartz and Fausto Fanizza Remix)	Above & Beyond featuring Zoë Johnston	5:09
4.	"Vernal"	Spencer Brown	4:05
5.	"Shadows"	Oliver Smith	4:05
6.	"Sahara"	Nick Sember	4:19
7.	"Zero-Day"	Judah	4:04
8.	"Inspire"	Jaytech	4:34
9.	"Shout"	Grum	4:05
10.	"Don't Take It Away"	Soundprank	5:04
11.	"Elevate"	ilan Bluestone	4:33
12.	"Love On a Real Train"	Fatum & Judah	3:09
13.	"Endorphin"	Oliver Smith	4:10
14.	"Brief Encounter"	Wrechiski	6:03
15.	"Malacosta"	ilan Bluestone	4:17
16.	"Millions"	Kyau & Albert	3:16
17.	"Only Good Mistake"	Alpha 9 & Koven	3:24
18.	"From The Past"	Andrew Bayer	5:07

Disc Two
No.	Title	Artist	Length
1.	"Destiny"	Andrew Bayer and ilan Bluestone	8:01
2.	"No One On Earth" (Gabriel & Dresden Remix, Above & Beyond Respray)	Above & Beyond featuring Zoë Johnston	6:00
3.	"On the Moon"	Oliver Smith	5:00
4.	"Everything's a Lie"	Sunny Lax & Aneym	4:29
5.	"Amsterdam" (Smith & Pledger Update)	Luminary	5:29
6.	"1001"	Above & Beyond	5:32
7.	"Olympus"	Genix	4:13
8.	"Alright Now" (Above & Beyond Club Mix)	Above & Beyond & Justine Suissa	5:12
9.	"Omen In The Rain" (Myon Club Mix)	Myon featuring Alissa Feudo	5:27
10.	"Balearic Balls"	Above & Beyond	4:38
11.	"Sink The Lighthouse" (Maor Levi Remix)	Above & Beyond featuring Alex Vargas	5:07
12.	"Higher Love"	Seven Lions and Jason Ross featuring Paul Meany	4:49
13.	"Valor"	Jason Ross	4:11
14.	"On A Good Day" (ilan Bluestone Remix)	OceanLab	4:22

== Release history ==
Region	Date	Label	Format
Worldwide	10 February 2017	Anjunabeats	CD, Digital Download
