= Sirens of the Sea =

2008 debut album by Above & Beyond presenting Oceanlab

Studio album by Above & Beyond presents OceanLab
- Released: 21 July 2008
- Recorded: 2006–2008, Fortress Studios, London and Can Tumasi, Ibiza
- Genres: Progressive trance, uplifting trance, vocal trance, downtempo
- Length: 70:36
- Label: Anjunabeats
- Producers: Jono Grant, Tony McGuinness, Paavo Siljamäki, Justine Suissa, Bob Bradley

Singles from Sirens of the Sea
- 1. "Sirens of the Sea" Released: 21 April 2008; 2. "Miracle" Released: 14 July 2008; 3. "Breaking Ties" Released: 1 December 2008; 4. "On a Good Day" Released: 6 April 2009; 5. "Lonely Girl" Released: 15 June 2009

Professional ratings
Review scores
Source	Rating
About.com	4/5 stars
Sputnikmusic	3.5/5 stars

Sirens of the Sea is the debut album by the British vocal trance group Above & Beyond presents OceanLab, released on 21 July 2008 through Anjunabeats.

On 8 June 2009 a remix edition of the album was released, Sirens of the Sea Remixed, which features both previously released and new remixes.

== Track listing ==
All songs produced by Jono Grant, Tony McGuinness, Paavo Siljamäki and Justine Suissa. Additional beat production on "Miracle" by Bob Bradley.

No.	Title	Length
1.	"Just Listen"	3:50
2.	"Sirens of the Sea"	5:56
3.	"If I Could Fly"	5:09
4.	"Breaking Ties"	5:14
5.	"Miracle"	6:43
6.	"Come Home"	4:33
7.	"On a Good Day"	5:57
8.	"Ashes"	6:30
9.	"I Am What I Am"	4:46
10.	"Lonely Girl"	5:32
11.	"Secret"	5:20
12.	"On the Beach"	4:45
13.	"Breaking Ties" (Flow mix)	6:11

== Credits and personnel ==
- Jono Grant – songwriter, producer, performer, artwork
- Tony McGuinness – songwriter, producer, performer, artwork
- Paavo Siljamäki – songwriter, producer, performer, artwork
- Justine Suissa – songwriter, producer, performer, vocals, artwork
- Bob Bradley – additional beat production (track 5)
- Miles Showell – mastering
- Zena Holloway – underwater photographs of Justine Suissa
- Phyllis Cohen – make-up
- Alexia Somerville – styling
- Chris Davison – photograph of OceanLab
- David Struwig – hair
- Marc Bicker – photo post production
- Stylorouge – photo post production
- James Grant – management
- Jess Roe – label manager
- Andy Bonwick – artwork assistance
- Michael Farrell – label assistant for Anjunabeats.
- Matt Learmouth – UK press

Credits adapted from Sirens of the Sea liner notes.

== Sirens of the Sea Remixed ==
Sirens of the Sea Remixed

Compilation album by Above & Beyond presents OceanLab
- Released: 8 June 2009
- Genres: Trance, progressive trance, progressive house
- Length: 81:02 (Disc one); 81:11 (Disc two)
- Label: Anjunabeats

Disc one
No.	Title	Length
1.	"If I Could Fly (Jaytech Remix)"	7:13
2.	"Come Home (Michael Cassette Remix)"	7:52
3.	"On the Beach (Andy Duguid Remix)"	7:55
4.	"Lonely Girl (Gareth Emery Remix)"	7:48
5.	"On a Good Day (Above & Beyond Club Mix)"	7:50
6.	"I Am What I Am (Lange Remix)"	8:42
7.	"Breaking Ties (Above & Beyond Analogue Haven Mix)"	8:03
8.	"Miracle (Above & Beyond Club Mix)"	7:37
9.	"Ashes (Oliver Smith Remix)"	7:22
10.	"Sirens of the Sea (Above & Beyond Club Mix)"	7:54

Disc two
No.	Title	Length
1.	"Secret (Andrew Bayer Remix)"	8:20
2.	"Just Listen (Myon & Shane 54 Remix)"	8:20
3.	"On a Good Day (16 Bit Lolitas Remix)"	7:30
4.	"Miracle (Michael Cassette Remix)"	8:29
5.	"Sirens of the Sea (Sonorous Remix)"	7:30
6.	"Breaking Ties (Duderstadt Vocal Remix)"	7:39
7.	"Satellite (Original Above & Beyond Mix)"	7:27
8.	"Sky Falls Down (Armin van Buuren Remix)"	7:34
9.	"Clear Blue Water (Ferry Corsten Remix)"	7:18
10.	"Beautiful Together (Signum Remix)"	8:13
11.	"Lonely Girl (Ronski Speed Remix) [Bonus Track]"	9:20
12.	"On a Good Day (Daniel Kandi Mix) [Bonus Track]"	7:22
13.	"Breaking Ties (Jaytech vs. James Grant Mix) [Bonus Track]"	7:56
14.	"Miracle (Martin Roth Remix) [Bonus Track]"	8:58
15.	"Sirens of the Sea (Cosmic Gate Vocal Mix) [Bonus Track]"	9:19
