= Anjunabeats Worldwide 04 =

Compilation album by Maor Levi and Nitrous Oxide
- Released: 23 April 2012
- Genre: Trance, progressive trance
- Label: Anjunabeats

Anjunabeats compilation chronology
Anjunadeep:04 (2012)	Anjunabeats Worldwide 04 (2012)

Anjunabeats Worldwide chronology
Anjunabeats Worldwide 03 (2011)	Anjunabeats Worldwide 04 (2012)	Anjunabeats Worldwide 05 (2015)

Anjunabeats Worldwide 04 is the fourth compilation album in the Anjunabeats Worldwide compilation series. It is mixed and compiled by Israeli trance producer Maor Levi and Polish trance producer Nitrous Oxide, and was released on 23 April 2012 on Anjunabeats. The compilation is named after the radio show of the same name, which airs every Sunday evening on the internet radio Digitally Imported.

== Track listing ==
Disc one: Mixed by Maor Levi
No.	Title	Artist	Length
1.	"Splitting"	Breakfast pres. Keyworth	3:10
2.	"Won’t Say No"	Maor Levi	6:09
3.	"Electrified" (Mat Zo Remix)	Tate & Diamond feat. Nicolai	5:09
4.	"It’s Yours"	Mat Zo	5:16
5.	"No More Serious Faces"	Inpetto	4:38
6.	"Phoenix From The Flames" (Maor Levi Remix)	Boom Jinx feat. Justine Suissa	5:09
7.	"Sevas"	3rd Planet	4:49
8.	"Pistol Whip"	Norin & Rad	5:09
9.	"Alba" (Maor Levi Remix)	Super8	4:54
10.	"Namaste"	Bluestone	5:38
11.	"Aura"	Genix	6:08
12.	"Safari" (Maor Levi Remix)	Ost & Meyer	5:38
13.	"This Love"	Kyau & Albert	4:36
14.	"Afterthought" (Heatbeat Remix)	Parker & Hanson	4:59
15.	"Median" (Keyworth Remix)	Breakfast pres. Keyworth	7:36
Total length:			1:19:03

Disc two: Mixed by Nitrous Oxide
No.	Title	Artist	Length
1.	"In And Out Of Phase" (Norin & Rad Remix)	Andrew Bayer & Matt Lange feat. Kerry Leva	5:01
2.	"Helion" (Norin & Rad Remix)	Mike Koglin vs Genix	3:52
3.	"Nautica"	Nitrous Oxide & Dan Stone	5:20
4.	"Orion"	Adam Kancerski	5:37
5.	"Human Turbines" (Beat Service Remix)	Edu & Cramp	5:13
6.	"Antalya"	Ost & Meyer	4:55
7.	"Manchester AM" (2012 Club Mix)	Craig Connelly	3:34
8.	"Contrast" (Nitrous Oxide Remix)	Sunny Lax	5:20
9.	"Gr8!"	Nitrous Oxide	5:34
10.	"Scarlet Heaven" (Dan Stone Remix)	Ost & Meyer	4:50
11.	"Energize"	Nitrous Oxide & Space RockerZ	4:50
12.	"Azzura"	Boom Jinx & Daniel Kandi	4:18
13.	"Awakenings"	Super8 & Tab	5:19
14.	"Tiburon"	Nitrous Oxide	4:50
15.	"Andromeda"	Cramp	3:48
16.	"Progress" (Nitrous Oxide Remix)	Oliver Smith	5:22
Total length:			1:17:49
