= DYLN =

Canadian singer and songwriter (born 1988)

Stef Lang
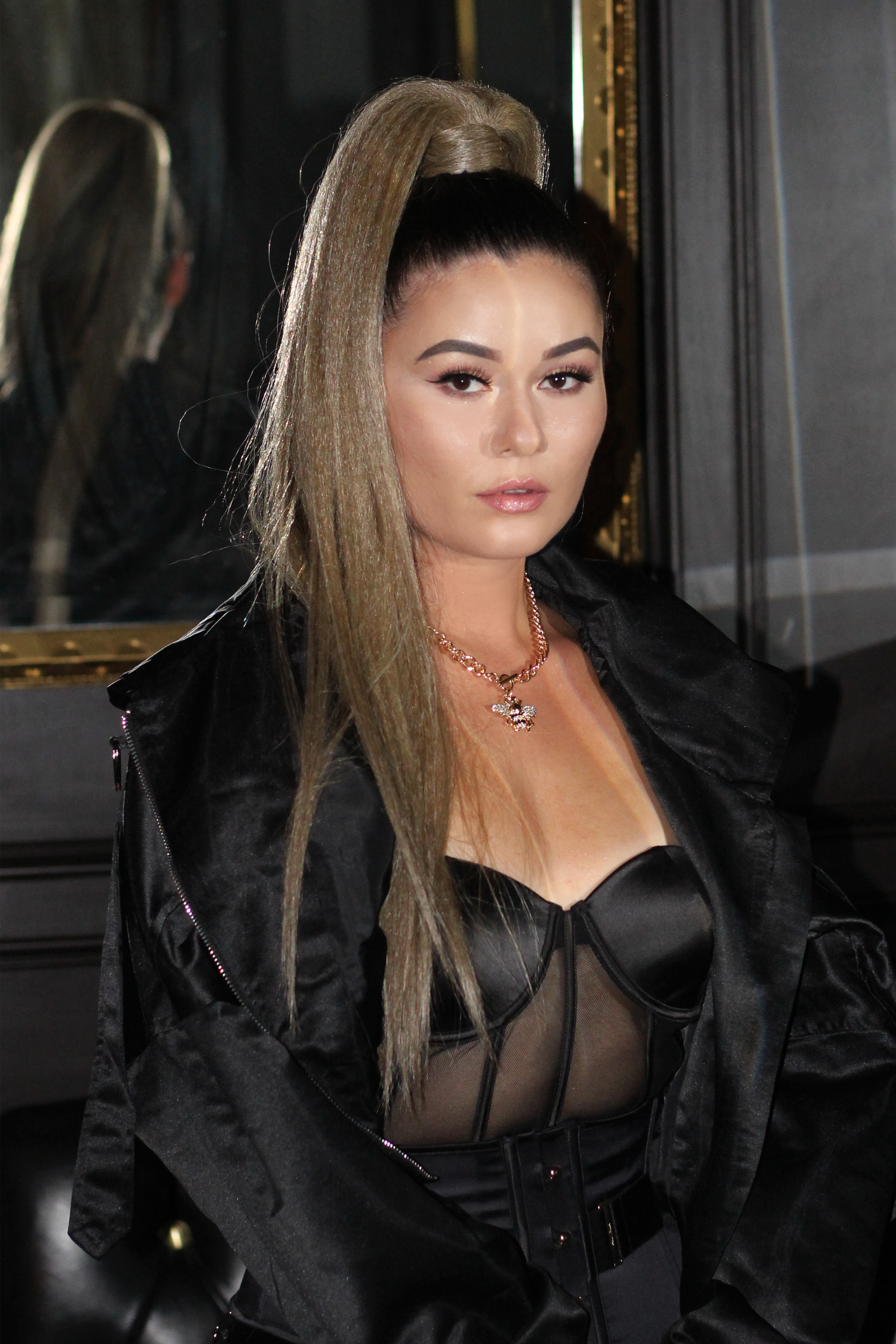
- Stef Lang backstage at the Hotel Café in Los Angeles, 2021

Background information
- Born: Stephanie Jane Lang; December 30, 1988 (age 37); Nanaimo, British Columbia, Canada
- Origin: Vancouver Island, British Columbia, Canada
- Genres: Pop, R&B, electropop, alternative pop
- Occupations: Singer, songwriter, producer, vocal producer
- Instruments: Vocals, guitar, piano
- Years active: 2006–present
- Label: Independent
- Website: steflang.ca

DYLN is a name used by Stephanie Lang, a Canadian Pop/R&B artist, songwriter, and producer based in Los Angeles, California. Her musical style is mainly pop and R&B, with influences of hip hop and electronic sounds.

== Career ==
Lang is known by the stage name Stef Lang. She adopted the name in 2016 and independently released her debut single "Better Things", which Pip Williams, of The Line of Best Fit describes as, "Sharp, slick electro-pop with a hell of an attitude." Lang wrote and co-produced her latest EP, Stef Lang _02, released in December 2020, which amassed over a million streams, garnering attention from coveted curated playlists, such as New Music Friday and Alternative R&B.

The name comes from a guitar which she named Stef Lang, on which she wrote songs during a depression. The carbon fibre guitar was said to be unbreakable, so the singer kept the sentiment as her name. Lang is known for her wide-ranging vocals, her talk-rapping style, and for her messages of female empowerment. She has performed at notable venues in New York, such as Rockwood Music Hall, The Bitter End, and Pianos, as well as clubs in Los Angeles such as The Peppermint Club, Hotel Cafe, and Resident. She has toured internationally. She has performed at events such as South by Southwest, NXNE, the Canadian Radio Music Awards, the Toronto International Film Festival, and CMJ.

=== 2006-2010: Career beginnings ===
In the spring of 2006, Lang won a local radio station talent competition hosted by The Beat 94.5, now Virgin Radio, where she won a four-song recording deal with a recording studio. After graduating high school at 17, she moved to Vancouver, BC, where accepted a studio internship to learn more about the music industry and music production.

Two EPs were released, titled Birth and Blood and Bravery. In 2010, she independently released her debut album, The Underdog, which earned her two Canadian Radio Music Award Nominations (HOT AC & CHR) for her single "Mr. Immature". The album was also nominated for Pop Album of the Year at the Western Canadian Music Awards.

=== 2010-2016: The Underdog, Fighting Mirrors, Arrows Pt. 1 & 2 ===
In 2012, Lang self-released her EP Fighting Mirrors and her single "Paper Doll." Later that year, she independently released a full album called Self, which she wrote and produced entirely herself. In 2013, Lang's vocals were featured on ISH's song "Rollin'" released on Warner Music. She released her EP Rubix in 2014. By 2015, Lang released two more EPs, Arrows Pt. 1 and Arrows Pt. 2, where she once again wrote and produced all of the tracks. Her final release under the name Stef Lang was her single "Stronger".

=== 2017-2018: "Better Things", "Hold", Chapter 1: The Truth ===
In 2017, Lang made her debut as Stef Lang with her single "Better Things", which garnered buzz from notable music blogs such as The Line of Best Fit and Going Solo. Later that year she released two more singles, "Hold" and "Colours". In 2018, Lang moved to Los Angeles to further pursue music opportunities and later released her first EP, Chapter 1: The Truth. Mitch Mosk of Atwood Magazine described Chapter 1: The Truth as "A gorgeous three-track collection of dynamic and intimately reflective dark indie pop." As a follow-up to her first EP, she later released another three-song EP called "Chapter 2: The Silver Lining" in 2019.

=== 2019: Rings ===
In 2019, Lang released a full-length album called Rings, which she wrote and co-produced with her husband Frequency (Eminem, Rihanna), written entirely about their marriage.

=== 2020: Stef Lang_02 ===
She wrote and co-produced her most recent EP, Stef Lang_02 with her husband and released it in December 2020.

== Musical style ==
Performing at SXSW in Austin, Texas, 2018

The genre of Lang's music has been described as pop with R&B and electronic undertones, often using hip-hop influences. Her latest EP Stef Lang_02 includes her wide-ranging vocals in songs like "Shower" as well as her talk-rapping style in "Quit Talkin’" and showcases influences to the likes of Beyoncé, Missy Elliot and The Black Eyed Peas. About her songwriting process, she says, "My philosophy is to write real songs," often crediting influences like Kid Cudi and Robyn, whose themes of darkness and sadness have molded her music.

Music blog PressPlayOk stated, "Proclaiming this NYC gal as a future pop queen. Not to be missed." Lang is also a music producer, often producing songs on her own.

== Discography ==
=== Singles ===
Title	Details
"Better Things"	Released: March 3, 2017; Label: Self-released; Format: Digital download
"Hold"	Released: June 7, 2017; Label: Self-released; Format: Digital download
"Colours"	Released: November 10, 2017; Label: Self-released; Format: Digital download
"Need Me"	Released: June 26, 2020; Label: Self-released; Format: Digital download

Extended plays

Title	Details
Chapter 1: The Truth	Released: November 2, 2018; Label: Self-released; Format: Digital download
Chapter 2: The Silver Lining	Released: May 17, 2019; Label: Self-released; Format: Digital download
Stef Lang_02	Released: December 30, 2020; Label: Self-released; Format: Digital download

Studio albums

Title	Details
Rings	Released: November 15, 2019; Label: Independent; Formats: Digital Download

== Film & TV song placements ==
- "Like That" – Almost Family / Pilot Episode
- "Face The Arrows" – VH1's Black Ink Crew" / Episode 514
- "Stronger" – VH1's "Black Ink Crew" / Episode 506
- "Paper Doll" – LA Complex Episode 212
- "Bullet Train" – Degrassi Episode 1217
- "Diamonds" – Degrassi Episode "Love Lockdown Part 2"
- "Straitjacket" – Degrassi Episode "In Your Eyes", Season 9 Ep. 18
- "All For You" – Degrassi Episode 1311
- "Overdrive" – Degrassi Episode 1326
- "Vulnerable" – Rookie Blue Episode 11
- "All This Time" – The Best Years
- "You Make Me Wanna Fly" – Delta Air Lines
- "Give a Little Bit" – CTV BC "Making a Difference" campaign
- "Going Places" – Beauty and the Beast No. 308

== Vocal features ==
- "Last Chance" – Kaskade – Grammy-nominated album Atmosphere
- "Rollin'" – Ish (ft. Stef Lang) – Warner Music Group
- "Consciousness of Love" – Delerium – Music Box Opera
- "Chrysalis Heart" – Delerium – Music Box Opera
- "All These Wounds" – Ilan Bluestone & BT (ft. on Anjunabeats Worldwide05)
- "Easy" – Duke & Jones

== Appearances ==
- 2009 – Canadian Music Cafe during TIFF (Toronto International Film Festival)
- 2010 – NXNE (North by Northeast) (Toronto)
- 2010 – CMJ (College Music Journal) (New York)
- 2011 – Canadian Radio Music Awards (Toronto)
- 2011 – Showcase at Canadian Music Week (Toronto)
- 2013 – Showcase & CMF Acoustic Session at Canadian Music Week (Toronto)
- 2018 - South by Southwest Showcase
- Lang has opened for K'naan, Fefe Dobson, Simple Plan, Ron Sexsmith, Matt Good, Shawn Desman, and Sum 41.

=== Radio success ===
- "Mr. Immature" – Hit No. 5 on the Billboard Chart for Canadian Emerging Artist
- "Slave 2 Love" – American Music Chart – CANADA: HOT AC; hit #12 on Mainstream Radio
- "Rollin'" Ish – 2012 – Canadian Hot 100, peaked at No. 59
- "Paper Doll" – 2012 – No. 1 Most Added Song in Canadian Radio
