= Anjunabeats Worldwide 05 =

Compilation album by Ilan Bluestone
- Released: 25 May 2015
- Genre: Trance, progressive trance, progressive house
- Label: Anjunabeats

Anjunabeats compilation chronology
Anjunabeats Volume 11 (2014)	Anjunabeats Worldwide 05 (2015)

Anjunabeats Worldwide chronology
Anjunabeats Worldwide 04 (2012)	Anjunabeats Worldwide 05 (2015)	Anjunabeats Worldwide 06 (2016)

Anjunabeats Worldwide 05 is the fifth compilation album in the Anjunabeats Worldwide compilation series. It is mixed and compiled by British trance producer Ilan Bluestone and was released on 25 May 2015 on Anjunabeats. The compilation is named after the radio show of the same name, which airs every Sunday evening on the internet radio Digitally Imported.

== Track listing ==
No.	Title	Artist	Length
1.	"Take Off"	Ilan Bluestone	2:54
2.	"Lotus"	Fehrplay	4:47
3.	"Cloudchaser"	Ilan Bluestone	5:16
4.	"Hello (Jerome Isma-Ae Remix)"	Above & Beyond	4:55
5.	"Color Field"	Kyau & Albert	4:39
6.	"All These Wounds"	Ilan Bluestone & BT featuring Stef Lang	6:12
7.	"Legion"	Soundprank	5:01
8.	"Melba"	Sunny Lax	4:28
9.	"Patience (Club Mix)"	Super8 & Tab featuring Julie Thompson	3:43
10.	"Do Androids Dream Part 2"	Andrew Bayer	6:49
11.	"Peace of Mind (Extended Mix)"	Above & Beyond featuring Zoë Johnston	5:26
12.	"Bonsai"	Ilan Bluestone	4:59
13.	"43"	Ilan Bluestone	5:14
14.	"Super Human"	Andrew Bayer featuring Asbjorn	5:18
15.	"Atlas"	Wrechiski & Jason Ross	5:00
16.	"We're All We Need (Ilan Bluestone Remix)"	Above & Beyond featuring Zoë Johnston	4:24
