= Norhan Bayomi =

Egyptian environmental scientist

Norhan Bayomi is an Egyptian environmental scientist, architect, inventor, electronic music producer, and Trance DJ with the name "Nourey." Bayomi was born in Egypt and currently lives in Boston, Massachusetts, United States.

== Career ==
Bayomi obtained a bachelor's degree in architecture in 2008 and a master's degree in environmental design in 2009 from Cairo University. She obtained a second master's degree in architectural and building science and technology from MIT. Bayomi is currently a PhD student at MIT.

Bayomi is the co-founder of an architectural firm with branches in Cairo and Riyadh, and the co-founder of two start-ups: Lamarr.AI and Urban Data Analytics.

Bayomi’s research is focused on the environment and climate change and the impact they have on developing regions. She explores the utilization of technology and AI to better understand building and urban design, while defining suitable adaptation strategies.

Anjunabeats, a London record label owned by Above & Beyond, signed with Bayomi as the artist "Nourey." She filmed her first livestream act from her dorm room on the 15th of July, 2020.
