= Marsh (DJ) =

British DJ and producer

- Born: Tom Marshall
- Genres: Progressive house; deep house
- Occupations: DJ; music producer
- Years active: 2012–present
- Labels: Silk Music; Anjunadeep
- Website: marshmusician.com

Tom Marshall (born c. 1993), known professionally as Marsh, is a British DJ and music producer, based out of Cincinnati. He has collaborated with the likes of Sasha and Ferry Corsten, remixed Above & Beyond and released three studio LPs via Silk Music and Anjunadeep.

== Biography ==
=== Early life ===
Growing up just outside of Worthing, UK, Marshall's father worked as a train conductor. Marshall himself was attuned to melody and musical structure from a very young age.

=== Career ===
In 2017, Marshall released 'Life On The Shore' album on Silk Music. Marshall reprised his Silk Music appearance with a track on the Only Silk 05 compilation. In 2021, Marshall released his second LP, 'Lailonie', his first via Anjunadeep. In 2023, Marshall released follow-up LP, 'Endless'. His remix of Above & Beyond 'Sirens Of The Sea' was named the seventh best-selling progressive house record of 2024.

== Discography ==
Studio albums

- Life On The Shore (2018)
- Lailonie (2021)
- Endless (2023)
- Home (2026)

Remixes

- Above & Beyond pres. OceanLab - Sirens Of The Sea (Marsh Remix) - 2024
- Above & Beyond - Sun In Your Eyes - 2025
- Jody Wisternoff - Sweetest Thing (Marsh Remix) - 2025
