= The U Movie =

- Directed by: Alexander Reid; Thomas Douglas
- Release date: 2010
- Running time: 85 minutes
- Country: Canada
- Language: English

The U Movie is a 2010 Canadian documentary film that describes the backpacking adventures of two men as they travel to the South Pacific in late September 2004.

The film won the Sir Edmund Hillary Award at the 2011 Telluride Mountainfilm festival and the Rising Star Award in Filmmaking at the 2011 Canada International Film Festival.

== About the film ==
The two main people in the move are Alexander Reid and his high school friend, Tommy Douglas. Reid had the idea and Douglas had the film knowledge. Reid was halfway through his degree at Acadia University in Nova Scotia when he left to make the film. Douglas was at the University of Western Ontario. He left there to assist with the film, and they headed out to the South Pacific. In the beginning, the project was to be a movie about making a movie but it turned into something greater than that. They had no idea of how the movie would turn out of where their adventures would lead them. Over an eleven-month period they went to Thailand, Laos, Vietnam, Australia, New Zealand, Fiji and Japan.

According to the article in issue four of Rove magazine, the inspiration for the film was a result of a young guy's desire to get out of the everyday routine and see what else there is.

== Music ==
Duo Kyau & Albert were contacted Alexander Reid who asked to use their music in the film. Curious about the film, there was increased interest by the pair after they saw some trailers of the film. From this they decided to make a single "On the Way", and then later they asked Reid to make a music clip for the single using footage from the film. This resulted in a very large response.

== Awards ==
- Canada International Film Festival - 2011 Rising Star Award Winners, Documentary Competition
- Mountainfilm Festival, 2011 Sir Edmund Hillary Awards, Documentary Competition
