= Dan Stone (DJ) =

British disc jockey

- Born: Norfolk, England, United Kingdom
- Genres: Trance, big room
- Labels: Anjunabeats; Armada; Enhanced; Alter Ego; FSOE Fables

Dan Stone is a British DJ. He specializes in electronic dance music, specifically trance. He has been signed to Anjunabeats, an EDM label, and his music has appeared frequently on music programs such as Armin Van Buuren's A State of Trance.

== Career ==
At the age of 17, Stone started DJing as a resident performing various genres of music such as house, trance and garage. He began producing music in 2005 and signed with Anjunabeats in 2006. In 2017, he launched the FSOE Fables record label, which specializes in melodic and euphoric trance.
