= Mike Koglin =

German DJ and producer

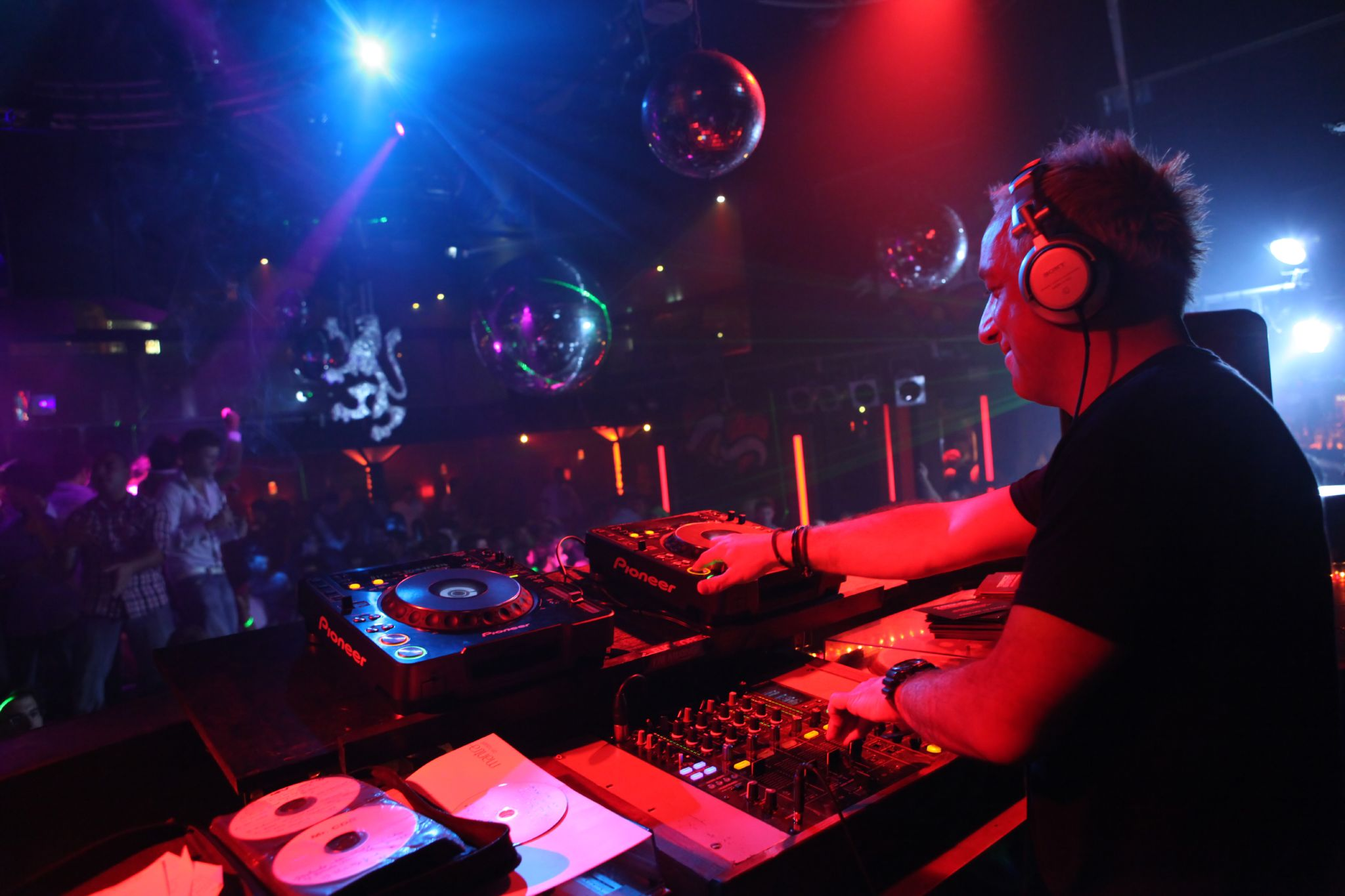
- Mike Koglin at Gatecrasher 2009

Background information
- Born: Mike Koglin
- Genres: Trance; progressive trance; progressive house
- Occupations: DJ, producer
- Website: www.mikekoglin.com

Mike Koglin is a German DJ and producer.

== Biography ==
In 1998, Koglin had success with the single "The Silence", a remake of Depeche Mode's "Enjoy the Silence", which reached number 20 in the UK Singles Chart. He has since written and produced a large number of singles including collaborations with artsist such as Darren Tate, Kirsty Hawkshaw and Above & Beyond, and he has remixed songs by numerous established artists including Dido, George Michael, Paul Oakenfold, Ayumi Hamasaki, Mat Zo and Armin Van Buuren. His song "When Will You Learn", written and produced for Boy George, received a Grammy nomination for Best Dance Recording in 1998.

Koglin has seen comparable success as a DJ with worldwide performances at globally renowned clubs and events. In 2008, he ranked 87th in the voting for the "Top 100 DJs" of DJ Magazine, and in 2009 he again entered the list at number 88. Koglin hosts his own radio show Every Direction aired monthly on DI.fm and other international stations.

Having run his own music label Noys Music since 2004 Koglin launched a second label in 2016 named Yomo Records for progressive house and techno releases. He has also released his work on Anjunabeats, Armada Music, Perfecto, Silk Music, Vandit Records and several other international record labels. Koglin has developed several online courses for Point Blank Music School, which he also oversees as an instructor. Having lived in London from 1990 to 2012, Koglin now lives and works in Berlin, Germany.

== Discography ==
=== Albums ===
- 2006: VS
- 2009: Visions Around the Globe: Noys Sessions

=== Singles (selected) ===
- 1995: Club Zone - "Hands Up"
- 1998: "The Silence"
- 1999: "On My Way"
- 1999: "Fortuna 2000"
- 2000: "A New Day" (feat. Kirsty Hawkshaw)
- 2000: "Not Alone"
- 2002: "Now Is the Time" (vs. Darren Tate)
- 2002: "The Journey"
- 2003: "Time (No Challenge, No Success)" (feat. DJ UTO)
- 2003: "Loaded"
- 2003: "Another World"
- 2003: "Pushed On"
- 2004: "Circuits" (with Jono Grant)
- 2004: "Yoake" (feat. DJ UTO)
- 2004: "Relentless" (vs. JFK)
- 2004: "Time"
- 2005: "Sequential" (w. Jono Grant)
- 2005: "1:1.618"
- 2005: "The Silence 2005"
- 2006: "Bermuda" (vs. Lange)
- 2006: "Radar" (vs. Lange)
- 2006: "Sanctuary"
- 2006: "Shift" (with Alex M.O.R.P.H.)
- 2006: "Ultraviolet"
- 2006: "Untitled Audio" (vs. P.O.S.)
- 2007: "All the Way" (with Mark Pledger)
- 2007: "Reloaded" (vs. Energy Dai)
- 2007: "Dirty Monster" (with Marc Vedo)
- 2008: "United"
- 2009: "Autumn" (vs. P.O.S.)
- 2009: "Find Me" (feat. Tania Laila)
- 2011: "The Silence (2011 Remixes)"
- 2011: "Sunstar"
- 2011: "Metronomic" (with Dale Corderoy)
- 2011: "Scalar"
- 2011: "Helion" (vs. Genix)
- 2012: "Dyno" (vs. Genix)
- 2012: "Varana"
- 2012: "Vision" (vs. 7 Skies)
- 2013: "Crunk" (with Tempo Giusto)
- 2014: "Taiko"
- 2015: "Kosmonaut"
- 2015: "Vesta" (with Moodfreak)
- 2016: "Octagon" (with Moodfreak)
- 2017: "Initial/Impact" (as Sudhaus)
- 2018: "Raumklang" (as Sudhaus)
- 2020: "Sphere"

=== Remixes (selected) ===
- Eve Gallagher - "Heaven Has to Wait" (1996)
- Boy George - "Love Is Leaving" (1996)
- Boy George - "When Will You Learn" (1997)
- Ruff Driverz presents Arrola - "La Musica" (1999)
- Lustral - "Everytime" (1999)
- Hurley & Todd - "Sunstorm" (2000)
- Ayumi Hamasaki - "Immature" (2001)
- Kirsty Hawkshaw - "Fine Day" (2002)
- DJ Wout - "Mastermind" (2004)
- DJ Tatana feat. Claudio Mangione - "Time of My Life" (2006)
- Cass Fox - "Touch Me" (2006)
- The Thrillseekers - "Newlife" (2007)
- DT8 Project - "Succumb to the Night" (2007)
- Coldplay - "Viva la Vida" (2008)
- Arcane Science - "Twisted Intent" (2008)
- Sequentia presents Sunshade - "Vertigo" (2009)
- MaRLo feat. Em - "Capture" (2010)
- Sunny Lax & Solex - "Out of This World" (2010)
- Mat Zo - "Superman" (2011)
- Tempo Giusto - "Dive into the Echo" (2012)
- Kuoob - "VRM" (2012)
- Ronski Speed - "Sanity" (2013)
- Paul Oakenfold - "Touch Me" (2014)
- Armin van Buuren - "Sail" (2016)
- Armin van Buuren - "Rush Hour" (2016)
- Movement Machina - "Zone" (2022)
