= Sunny Lax =

Hungarian musician

- Birth name: Levente Márton
- Born: August 6, 1986 (age 38); Dunaharaszti, Hungary
- Genres: Trance; progressive house
- Occupation(s): Producer, DJ
- Instrument(s): Synthesizer, drum machine, equalizer
- Years active: 2005–present
- Labels: Anjunabeats; Black Hole Recordings; Enhanced Music
- Website: http://www.sunnylax.com/

Sunny Lax, born Levente Márton (Hungarian pronunciation: [ˈlɛvɛntɛ ˈmaːrton]; born August 6, 1986), is a Hungarian trance music and progressive house producer.

== Biography ==
=== Career ===
Sunny Lax debuted on the music scene with the 12" P.U.M.A. / Cassiopeia EP as his debut release on Anjunabeats in February 2006, which was widely played by highly esteemed DJs such as Paul van Dyk and Armin van Buuren.

Music and programming had been a major part of Levente's early life, and at the age of 13 he started producing music of his own without any prior music theory knowledge. After buying a few programming books from his pocketbook, he learnt about music software, notably the "Modeplug Tracker", and started to program his own music. He began to compete in various remix competitions in his native Hungary, performing well and boosting his self-esteem. This encouraged Levente to send one of his productions, P.U.M.A., to several music labels, where Anjunabeats agreed to sign it.

Sunny Lax's third single, "M.I.R.A.", was released on Anjunabeats on October 9, 2006. This was followed up with by "Blue Bird" on May 21, 2007.

In 2013, Sunny Lax launched his own record label "Sounds of Elysium" as a sublabel of Blue Soho Recordings, which would mainly feature progressive trance tracks. He released his single "Marvel" as the first track on the label.

== Discography ==
=== Releases ===
2006

- "P.U.M.A. / Cassiopeia" [Anjunabeats]
- "M.I.R.A." [Anjunabeats]

2007

- "Blue Bird" [Anjunabeats]

2008

- "Miquë" [Perceptive Recordings]
- Elda EP (as Acacia) [Mondo Records]

2009

- "Reborn" [Anjunabeats]
- "Thestral" (with Nawarro as Arcadem) [Dowalve Records]
- "The Last One" (with Nawarro as Arcadem) [Dowalve Records]
- "Jig" (with Nawarro as Arcadem) [Dowalve Records]
- "Suntear" (with Nawarro as Arcadem) [Deep Blue Records]
- "Sair et Lec" (as Acacia) [Deep Blue Records]
- "Heliotrope" [Dowalve Records]
- "Elysium" [Dowalve Records]
- "Release" [Red Force Recordings]
- "Aurora" [AVA Recordings]
- "Misgrey" [Anjunabeats]

2010

- "Out of this World" (with Solex) [Anjunabeats]
- "Vanesse" [Anjunabeats]

2011

- "Big Fat Kiss" (as Levente Marton) [Anjunadeep]
- "Always" [Monster Tunes]
- "Contrast" [Anjunabeats]
- "Viva La Revolución / Something is Broken EP" [Songbird]

2012

- "There’s Always A Way Out" (as Levente Marton) [Anjunadeep]
- Spring / Hattori Hanzo EP [Enhanced/Always Alive]
- "Isla Margarita / Naida" [Anjunabeats]
- "Miele" [Black Hole/Songbird]
- "Maono" [Songbird]

2013

- Late EP [Infrasonic]
- Marvel EP [Sounds of Elysium]

2014

- Illogical EP [Sounds of Elysium]
- "Karma" [Anjunabeats]
- "Luna" [Black Hole Recordings]
- "Bingo / Pyramides" [Infrasonic Recordings]
- "Daenerys" [Anjunabeats]

2015

- "Sonata" (with Super8 & Tab) [Anjunabeats]
- "Melba" [Anjunabeats]
- "See You On The Other Side" [ZeroThree]
- "Enceladus" [Anjunabeats]

2016

- "Black Water / Seven" (with Genix) [Anjunabeats]
- "Aeons" [Anjunabeats]
- "Everything's A Lie" (with Aneym) [Anjunabeats]

2017

- "Pequod / 86" [Anjunabeats]
- "Arrival" (with Genix) [Anjunabeats]
- Bad Bye EP [Anjunabeats]

2018

- "So Long / Obsydian" [Anjunabeats]
- "Adapt Or Die / Orange Is The New Grey" [Anjunabeats]
- "Counter Clockwise" (with Aneym) [Anjunabeats]
- "Underneath My Skin" (with First State featuring Paul Aiden) [Armada Music]

2019

- "Sheeverz / Alliance" [Anjunabeats]
- "Moonlight / Hallucination" [Anjunabeats]

2020

- "Solar Plexus / Torus" [Anjunabeats]
- Fountain EP [Anjunabeats]

2021

- "Delirium / Soul Seeker" [Anjunabeats]
- Controlled Chaos EP [Anjunabeats]
- "V.I.B.E. / Vortex" [Anjunabeats]
- "Praimfaya / You Can't Control Me" [Anjunabeats]

2022

- "Night Sky" [Anjunabeats]
- Emerald EP [Anjunabeats]

=== Remixes ===
2004

- Náksi and Brunner - Budapest Száll! (Sunny Lax and Perfect Vibes Trance RMX) [Record Expressz]

2005

- Dred - Csak a Hold (Trendi Trance Mix) [Dred Music]

2006

- Daniel Kandi - Breathe (Sunny Lax Remix) [Anjunabeats]
- Cellec & Ersa - Fridays (Sunny Lax Remix) [RealMusic Recordings]
- Perfect Pitch - Innocent (Sunny Lax Remix) [Redforce Recordings]

2007

- Alan M - Eleni (Sunny Lax Remix) [RealMusic Recordings]
- DT8 Project - Falling (Sunny Lax Remix) [Mondo Recordings]
- Angelic - Stay With Me (Sunny Lax Remix) [Mondo Recordings]

2008

- Soliquid - Music Is For Rich People (Sunny Lax Remix) [Captured Music]
- Jox - Killing Me (Sunny Lax Remix) [CDR]
- Ehren Stowers - Hidden Depths (Sunny Lax Remix) [DJSA Records]
- Myon - Albion (Sunny Lax Remix) [Black Hole Recordings]
- Stefan Cambridge - All I Wanted (Sunny Lax Remix) [Perceptive Recordings]

2009

- Daniel Wanrooy and T.O.M. - Colorado (Sunny Lax Remix) [Black Hole Recordings]
- Jason van Wyk - Far From Me (Sunny Lax Remix) [Redux Recordings]
- Avenger - Pegasus (Sunny Lax Remix) [Redforce Recordings]
- Reii - Shocks (Sunny Lax Remix) [Lost Language]
- Emotional Horizons featuring Stine Grove - Beautiful (Sunny Lax Remix) [Alter Ego]
- Nitrous Oxide - Aurora (Sunny Lax Remix) [Anjunabeats]
- Redstar - Long Way Home (Sunny Lax Remix) [Redforce Recordings]
- Sunny Lax and Nawarro presents Arcadem - Suntear (Sunny Lax Remix) [Deep Blue Records]
- Poshout - Golden Sands (Sunny Lax Remix) [Timeline]
- Anhken and Adrian - Intuition (Sunny Lax Remix) [Fraction Records]
- Lange presents Firewall - Wanderlust (Sunny Lax Chunky and Uplifting Remixes) [Anjunabeats]

2010

- Hodel and JP Bates - Mirrors (Sunny Lax Remix) [Perceptive Recordings]
- Sequentia - Mojito (Sunny Lax Remix) [Fraction Records]
- Elias B - After All (Sunny Lax Remix) [Blue Soho]
- Blue Tente featuring Stine Grove - Emptiness (Sunny Lax Remix) [Affective Recordings]
- Majai - Emotion Flash (Sunny Lax Remix) [Hardwired]
- Driving Force - Through The Years (Sunny Lax Remix) [Redforce Recordings]
- Vol Deeman - Colours (Sunny Lax Remix) [Harmonic Breeze Recordings]
- Astuni - Dedicated (Sunny Lax Remix) [Unearthed]
- Adam Nickey - Altara (Sunny Lax Remix) [Anjunabeats]
- Dave Emanuel - Inner Peace (Sunny Lax Remix) [Perceptive]
- Sunset - The Blue Sky (Sunny Lax Remix) [Infrasonic Recordings]
- Juventa - Sundesire (Sunny Lax Remix) [Harmonic Breeze]

2011

- Nitrous Oxide - North Pole (Sunny Lax Remix) [Anjunabeats]
- Tobi Atkins - Wind & Sea (Sunny Lax Remix) [Unearthed Records]
- Above & Beyond featuring Richard Bedford - Thing Called Love (Sunny Lax Remix) [Anjunabeats]
- Lior Levy - Way Down 2011 (Sunny Lax Remix) [Digital Insomnia Recordings]
- Garrido & Skehan - Changing Places (Sunny Lax Remix) [Hardwired]
- Super8 & Tab - Free Love (Sunny Lax Remix) [Anjunabeats]

2012

- Christian Drost - Strangers We Are (Sunny Lax Remix) [Sorcery Records]
- Nitrous Oxide - Tiburon (Sunny Lax Remix) [Anjunabeats]

2013

- Guy Alexander - Ascent (Sunny Lax Remix) [Sorcery Records]
- Nordan & Tetarise - Defying Gravity (Sunny Lax Remix) [Sorcery Records]
- David Farquharson - Keira (Sunny Lax Remix) [Sorcery Records]
- Accendo - Ledra (Sunny Lax Remix) [Infrasonic]
- CJ Daft - Resurrected (Sunny Lax Remix) [Above All]

2014

- Synthea - Long Day (Sunny Lax Remix) [Sorcery Records]
- JES - High Glow (Sunny Lax Remix) [Black Hole]
- Existence - Kilimanjaro (Sunny Lax Remix) [Sorcery Records]
- Jason Ross - Elements (Sunny Lax Remix) [Anjunabeats]

2015

- Zaa and 3PM featuring Nay Jay - Magic (Sunny Lax Remix) [Cloudland Music]
- Jack Vath and Breame - Arancini (Sunny Lax Remix) [Monster Tunes]
- Rui Da Silva featuring Wesley Steed - Sunrise (Sunny Lax Remix) [Perfecto]
- Aimoon featuring AxelPolo - I Think It's Love (Sunny Lax Remix) [Cloudland Music]
- Tetarise - Angel Flare (Sunny Lax Remix) [Sorcery Records]
- Miss Monique - No Fear (Sunny Lax Remix) [Freegrant Music]

2016

- Thomas Hayes featuring Kyler England - Golden (Sunny Lax Remix) [Enhanced]
- Boom Jinx featuring Aruna - Light As A Feather (Sunny Lax Remix) [Anjunabeats]
- Kyau vs. Albert - Made Of Sun (Sunny Lax Remix) [Euphonic]
- LTN - Autumn Leaves (Sunny Lax Remix) [Enhanced Progressive]
- Romix - Roulette (Sunny Lax Remix) [Sorcery Records]
- John Manz - Moments (Sunny Lax Remix) [Cloudland Music]
- Ryan Farish - Stories In Motion (Sunny Lax Remix) [Black Hole]
- Solarstone - Release (Sunny Lax Remix) [Armada]

2017

- Paul Oakenfold and Jordan Suckley - Amnesia (Sunny Lax Remix) [Perfecto]
- Cosmic Gate and JES - Fall Into You (Sunny Lax Remix) [Black Hole Recordings]
- Maglev and Adrian Alexander - Propagate (Sunny Lax Remix) [Elliptical Sun Recordings]

2018

- Max Meyer and Sendr - Parallax (Sunny Lax Remix) [Freegrant]
- Jan Johnston - Calling Your Name (Sunny Lax Remix) [Solar Storm]
- Chris Giuliano - Anaerobic (Sunny Lax Remix) [Elliptical Sun Recordings]
- First State and Kyler England - Everywhere (Sunny Lax Remix) [Magik Muzik]
- Seven Lions featuring Fiora - Dreamin' (Sunny Lax Remix) [Ophelia]
- Ilan Bluestone and Sunny Lax - 43+86=129 (Sunny Lax 303 Mix) [Anjunabeats]

2019

- Mitiska and Profetik featuring Julie Thompson - Blue (Sunny Lax Remix) [Ride Recordings]

2020

- Jason Ross and Fiora - When The Night Falls (Sunny Lax Remix) [Ophelia]
- Adrian Alexander & Paul Arcane - In My Soul (Sunny Lax Remix) [Elliptical Sun Recordings]
- Farius - Way Back When (Sunny Lax Remix) [Enhanced Progressive]
- Bryn Liedl - Rites (Sunny Lax Remix) [Euphonic]

2021

- Cold Blue - Painting Skies (Sunny Lax Remix) [Black Hole Recordings]
- Tritonal - Slave (Sunny Lax Remix) [Enhanced Music]
- Haliene - Glass Heart (Sunny Lax Remix) [Black Hole Recordings]
- Mitis featuring Zack Gray - Hurt (Sunny Lax Remix) [Ophelia]
- Airbase - Escape (Sunny Lax Remix) [Armada]
