= Paavo Siljamäki =

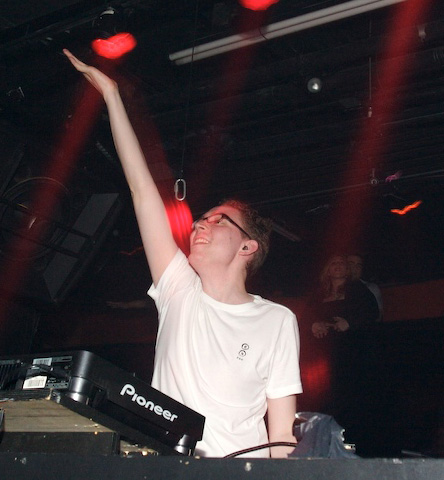

Background information
- Also known as: P.O.S, Aalto
- Born: Paavo Olavi Siljamäki; 25 April 1977 (age 49)
- Origin: Finland
- Genres: Trance, Electronica
- Occupations: Keyboardist, songwriter, trance DJ, trance producer
- Years active: 1990–present
- Label: Anjunabeats
- Website: www.anjunabeats.com

Paavo Olavi Siljamäki (born 25 April 1977) is a Finnish writer, producer and DJ, comprising one-third of the British trance band Above & Beyond. "P.O.S" is his solo project. He has also made music for various artists. Together with his bandmates, he has founded the trance music label, Anjunabeats.

== History ==
Based out of London since 1997, Siljamäki attended the University of Westminster where he met fellow Above & Beyond member Jono Grant. The duo discovered a mutual interest in Electronic Music. Siljamaki is credited as a producer under several Above & Beyond records, such as the Flow State album.

Siljamäki has twice been nominated for a Grammy award in the "Best Dance Recording" category. The first, in 2016, was for the track "We're All We Need", and the second in 2019 for the track Northern Soul.

=== P.O.S ===
Beside the production for Above & Beyond, Siljamäki also works under the P.O.S alias. The P.O.S single Gravity peaked at number 28 in the UK dance singles chart in March 2005. Released on Anjunabeats, Gravity was later remixed by James Grant and Andrew Bayer in 2012.

His mental health struggles drew inspiration for new music under the alias. Siljamaki revived the P.O.S alias in the studio, extending his solo work, releasing the Deeper Tales album in 2023.

On 23 February 2024, Siljamäki played a one-hour live performance under his P.O.S alias, at the Ahoy Rotterdam for A State of Trance, premiering new material.
