= Bart Claessen =

Dutch dance DJ

- Also known as: Barthezz, Stereoshaker
- Born: Bart Claessen; 22 January 1980 (age 46); Asten, North Brabant, Netherlands
- Origin: Weert, Limburg, Netherlands
- Genres: EDM, trance
- Occupations: DJ, producer
- Years active: 1989–present
- Label: Anjunabeats
- Website: www.bartclaessen.com

Bart Claessen (Dutch pronunciation: [bɑrt ˈklaːsə(n)]; born 22 January 1980) is a Dutch electronic dance DJ. He is best known for the trance songs "On the Move" and "Infected", both released in 2001 under the name Barthezz, which reached no. 18 and 25 on the UK Singles Chart respectively.

He has released a number of tracks under his own name, most notably "First Light" (2007) and "Madness" (2008).
