= Daniel Kandi =

Danish trance producer and DJ (born 1983)

- Also known as: DJ Mendoza, K-Flozz, Timmus
- Born: Daniel Kandi; 30 November 1983 (age 42)
- Origin: Denmark
- Genres: Trance
- Occupations: DJ, producer
- Years active: 2000–present
- Labels: Anjunabeats, Armada Music, Enhanced Recordings, Always Alive Recordings

Daniel Kandi (born 29 November 1983) is a Danish trance producer and DJ currently living in Aalborg, Denmark. Kandi entered the trance scene with the release of "Breathe" in 2006, on the highly successful Anjunabeats label. In 2010, he was ranked #77 in DJ Magazine's Top 100 DJ Poll. He is also an amateur snooker player.

== Biography ==
=== Musical career ===
Daniel Kandi began producing trance music in 2000 under the name DJ Mendoza. He was a member of the Danish music community then known as MyMusic (now known as BandBase), where he published his music. In 2003, he formed the duo Duval and Mundo with another member of the community, Anders Duvald Mikkelsen (also known as Stalker). They released their first single as Aurelius, titled "Sorrow", with Jamie P. and vocals by David Hughes, in September 2005 on the Dutch label Intrenze.

From 2004 to 2007, Daniel Kandi worked with A&R and executive producer Fritz Niko in two projects called Weekend Wonderz and Hit'n'Run, remixing for both Danish and international artists like Infernal, Inez, TV-2, Bent Fabric, Christine Milton and Terri Walker. They have been nominated three times at the Danish DeeJay Awards in the category "Danish Remix of the Year"; in 2006 for their remix of "Stronger" by singer Inez and their remix of "Alt det" by rapper Mortito, and in 2007 for their remix of "Ten Miles" by the dance act Infernal.

In 2006, Kandi produced a track called "Breathe", which was signed to the British trance label Anjunabeats in June 2006, as his first solo release. It was included as the final track in the compilation Anjunabeats Volume Four. The follow-up EP "Child / Nova" was released in January 2007, and both tracks were featured on the compilation Anjunabeats Worldwide 01. Kandi's third release, on Anjunabeats, on 2 July 2007, was "Make Me Believe / I Found The Way". Furthermore, "Make Me Believe" was featured on the compilation series entitled Anjunabeats Volume Five mixed by Above & Beyond.

On 15 November 2007 Armin van Buuren selected Luke Warner & Mat Lock – "Deep Psychosis (Daniel Kandi's Cure Mix)" as the "Tune of the Week" on A State Of Trance Episode 326. "Deep Psychosis" was released on 10 December 2007 on DJSA Records, after the track was signed to DJSA from users on HarderFaster. A remix competition for this track also appeared on the site.

In 2008, Kandi collaborated with Robert Nickson whom he visited in his studio in the Netherlands. This resulted in several tracks, with "Liberate" and "Rewire" being released on the A State of Trance label later the same year.

Every 3rd Friday, Daniel Kandi hosts his own radio show called "Always Alive" on the internet radio Afterhours FM from 18 to 20 CET.

In April 2010, Kandi released the track "Symphonica", released under the alias Timmus. It was selected by Dutch DJ Armin van Buuren as the best track of 2010 on his personal top 20.

In January 2011, he launched the record label Always Alive Recordings, in collaboration with Phillip Alpha, as a sub-label to Enhanced Music.

In January 2011, Kandi was nominated at the 2011 Danish DeeJay Awards in the category Danish DJ of the Year.

Kandi has mentioned in several interviews that the only equipment he has used to produce his tracks has been Propellerhead's Reason software.

On 3 March 2011 Armin van Buuren selected Daniel Kandi & Phillip Alpha's track "If It Ain’t Broke" as the "Tune of the Week" on A State Of Trance Episode 498. It was also included on Armin's mix album A State of Trance 2011.

His track, Saggitarius, is on the Universal Religion Vol. 5 from Armin Van Buuren.

In 2017, Kandi continued his touring career by visiting multiple countries in Asia, notably Bangkok. He was also featured as a line-up in the 2017 Luminosity Beach Festival trance music event held in the Netherlands.

=== Snooker career ===
Daniel Kandi won the Danish snooker championship for five consecutive years from 2004 to 2009. On 31 March 2018, Kandi became the first Danish player to score a 147 in an official tournament match when he made a maximum break in his first-round match against Bo Jarlstrøm at the Danish Championship.

He entered the 2018 Q School in a bid to win himself a place on the snooker professional tour. In January 2019, Kandi won the Nordic Snooker Championship, an amateur tournament held in Stockholm.

== Discography ==
=== Singles ===
2005

- Sorrow as Aurelius with Jamie P featuring David Hughes (Intrenze)

2006

- Breathe (Anjunabeats)

2007

- Child (Anjunabeats)
- Nova (Anjunabeats)
- Make Me Believe (Anjunabeats)
- I Found The Way (Anjunabeats)
- Back Home v.s. Kris O'Neil (Mondo Records)
- Turnmills (Fundamental Recordings)
- Soraya (Fundamental Recordings)
- Out Of Sight

2008

- Liberate/Rewire with Robert Nickson (A State of Trance)

2009

- Let Go/Lovin' Feeling with Neumann (Anjunabeats)
- Child (Anjunabeats)

2010

- Venice Beach (Anjunabeats)
- Everything Counts (Red Force Recordings)
- Australia/As One with Martijn Stegerhoek (Enhanced Music)
- Forgive Me/Piece of Me (Anjunabeats)
- Symphonica as Timmus (Streamlined Recordings)
- Sticks & Stones with Phillip Alpha (Enhanced Music)

2011

- Promised (Always Alive Recordings)
- If It Ain't Broke with Phillip Alpha (Enhanced Music)
- Just For You (Anjunabeats)
- Soul Searchin/Piece Of Me (Anjunabeats)
- Don't Fix It with Phillip Alpha (Always Alive Recordings)
- Insert Generic Title (Enhanced Music)

2012

- Sagittarius (Armind)
- Azzura with Boom Jinx (Enhanced Music)
- Flying Blue with Ferry Tayle (Enhanced Music)
- 3 Strikes UR In (Always Alive Recordings)
- The Perfect Match with Aligator (GatorRecords)
- Change The World feat. Sarah Russell (Enhanced Music)
- Fade

2013

- #Trancefamily (Always Alive Recordings)
- Arigatou with Jack Rowan (Enhanced Music)

2014

- Cityscape with Markus Wilkinson (Enhanced Music)
- Better Late Than Never (Always Alive Recordings)

2015

- Choon! with Matt Chowski (Always Alive Recordings)
- Spectre with Zack Mia (Always Alive Recordings)
- SkyOcean! with Max Braiman (Always Alive Recordings)

2016

- Number One (Always Alive Recordings)
- Sector 7 with Zack Mia (Always Alive Recordings)
- Open Road with Markus Wilkinson (Always Alive Recordings)
- When Dreams Become Reality with Joel Spencer (Always Alive Recordings)
- You & Me with Miroslav Vrlik (Always Alive Recordings)

2017

- Yangtze River with Witness45 (Always Alive Recordings)
- Match Made In Heaven with Dreamy (Always Alive Recordings)
- Freedom with André Visior (Always Alive Recordings)
- Holy Cow with Forion (Always Alive Recordings)
- Three Months with Anders Duvald (Always Alive Recordings)
- New Way with Exouler (Always Alive Recordings)
- What Happens When We End (Always Alive Recordings)

2018

- 7 Hours with Exouler (Always Alive Recordings)
- Finding Carl (FSOE Fables)
- Get Off (AVA White)
- Hong Kong with Witness45 (Always Alive Recordings)
- Remember (Summer With You) with Exolight (Always Alive Recordings)

2019

- FL390 with Boris Deckert (Always Alive Recordings)
- That's All You Get with Lasse Macbeth (Always Alive Recordings)

2020

- Nova II (The Second Journey) (Always Alive Recordings)
- Rise Again (We Shall Overcome) with A.R.D.I. (A State Of Trance)
- Concorde (On The Edge) with Boris Deckert (Always Alive Recordings)
- Caro With Erika K (Always Alive Recordings)

2021

- Space Tonic with Prox (Always Alive Recordings)
- Intercity with Lasse Macbeth (Always Alive Recordings)
- Talking Waves (Blue Soho Recordings)
- Freefall with Prox (AVA White)
- At Long Last with New Even (Freegrant Music)

2022

- Diversion with Parnassvs (Always Alive Recordings)
- Chasing Dreams (Always Alive Recordings)
- 80s Solution (Blue Soho Recordings)
- Balance In Chaos with Bruno Oloviani (High Voltage Recordings)

2023

- Balance (Blue Soho Recordings)
- Finally Able with Amos & Riot Night (Regenerate Records)

2024

- To Light A Fire with Reborn Sound System (Trance Friends Records)
- Ignite with Alexander Spark (Interplay Records)
- Marco Mi Destino with Divisional Phrase, Akku and Arman Bas (High Voltage Recordings)

2025

- Stay with M42 (FSOE Recordings)

2026

- Made of Glass (FSOE Recordings)
- Out Of Time (Hypersia Records)
