= Jaytech =

James Cayzer
- Also known as: Jaytech, Jimbo
- Born: 1985 (age 40–41); Canberra, Australia
- Genres: Electronica, progressive house, downbeat
- Occupations: Remixer, music producer, DJ, composer, pianist
- Labels: Anjunabeats, Anjunadeep, Positronic Digital, Zerothree
- Website: www.jaytechmusic.com

James Cayzer (born 1985), better known by his stage name Jaytech (not to be confused with YouTuber Jaytech) is an Australian electronic music producer, DJ, and a trained pianist.

Jaytech started producing at the age of 14, and released his first track at 16. In 2006, a remix of his track Genesis (Jimbo's Afterburner Mix) was included by Tiësto on his In Search of Sunrise 5: Los Angeles compilation. His first artist album Everything is OK was released in 2008, on Anjunadeep. It was also the first album released on that label.

His and James Grant's compilations "Anjunadeep 02" and "Anjunadeep 03" reached Number 1 in the iTunes dance chart. Mixmag called the former "the compilation of the month".

Jaytech has collaborated with artists including Steve Smith (house music vocalist), and electronic music producers such Soundprank, Tommy Murphy, and Matt Fax with their track "Aeris" described as "a truly captivating record that transcends genres" by Mixmag. He currently resides in Phoenix.

== Radio ==
Jaytech produces a monthly radio show and podcast. Titled "Jaytech Music", the show is syndicated to various FM and online radio stations across the globe. The show lasts for two hours, where the second hour is filled with a guest mix by a guest DJ or music producer.

== Discography ==
=== Albums ===
- Everything Is OK (23 June 2008)
- Multiverse (31 August 2012)
- Awakening (25 November 2015)

=== Singles and EPs ===
Year	(as) Artist	Release Title	Track Mixes	Label	Notes
2006	Mark Dynamix & Jaytech	Identify Me (2006 Vocal Mix)			
2006	Matt Rowan & Jaytech	Pulse	Pulse	Hope Recordings	
2006	Matt Rowan & Jaytech	Pulse	Silver Cities	Hope Recordings	
2007	Mark Dynamix & Jaytech	Destructor _{(Nick Galea & Matt Nugent / Original Dub / Vocal / Jono Fernandez mix)}			
2007	Jaytech	Spacelift / Essence	Spacelift	Anjunabeats	
2007	Jaytech	Spacelift / Essence	Essence	Anjunabeats	
2008	Jaytech	Headcase / Pepe's Garden	Headcase	Anjunabeats	
2008	Jaytech	Headcase / Pepe's Garden	Pepe's Garden	Anjunabeats	
2008	Matt Rowan & Jaytech	Noodles	Original Mix	Currve	
2008	Matt Rowan & Jaytech	Noodles	Probspot Remix	Currve	
2008	Matt Rowan & Jaytech	Spin Cycle	Original Mix	Currve	
2008	Matt Rowan & Jaytech	Spin Cycle	Olivier Giacomotto Remix	Currve	
2008	Jaytech & Jeff Drake	One Dress Two Legs	Original Mix	Kitschy Records	
2008	Jaytech & Jeff Drake	One Dress Two Legs	Dub Mix	Kitschy Records	
2008	Jaytech	Groove Nova / Deadlock	Groove Nova (Original Mix)	Anjunadeep	
2008	Jaytech	Groove Nova / Deadlock	Deadlock (Original Mix)	Anjunadeep	
2008	Jaytech	Groove Nova / Deadlock	Groove Nova (Oliver Smith Tech Remix)	Anjunadeep	
2008	Jaytech	Groove Nova / Deadlock	Groove Nova (Oliver Smith Deep Remix)	Anjunadeep	
2008	Jaytech	Vela	Original Mix	Anjunadeep	
2008	Jaytech	Vela	Tritonal Air Up There Mix	Anjunadeep	
2008	Jaytech	Vela	Myon & Shane 54 Remix	Anjunadeep	
2008	Jaytech	Vela	Electrobios & Interplay Remix	Anjunadeep	
2008	Jaytech	Pepe's Garden (Tritonal Air Up There Mix)	Pepe's Garden (Tritonal Air Up There Mix)	Anjunadeep	
2008	Jaytech	Bluefire	Original Mix	Rapid Response Recordings	
2008	Jaytech	Bluefire	Orlando Dub	Rapid Response Recordings	
2008	Jaytech	Pyramid	Original Mix	Anjunadeep	
2008	Jaytech	Pyramid	Club Mix	Anjunadeep	
2008	Jaytech	Pyramid	Dinka Remix	Anjunadeep	
2009	Jaytech	Sundance / Nemesis	Original Mixes	Anjunadeep	
2009	Jaytech	Metro / Wannabe	Original Mixes	Anjunadeep	
2009	Jaytech	Delta	Original Mix	Anjunadeep	
2009	Jaytech	Delta	PROFF Remix	Anjunadeep	
2009	Jaytech	Grip Shift	Original Mix	Baroque Recordings	Release featured in compilation "Exploring... Australia".
2009	Boom Jinx & Jaytech	Milano	Original Mix	Anjunadeep	
2009	Boom Jinx & Jaytech	Milano	Ad Brown Remix	Anjunadeep	
2010	Jaytech	In The Jungle / Ozone	Original Mixes	Anjunadeep	
2010	Jaytech & James Grant	Moth	Original Mix	Anjunadeep	
2010	Jaytech & James Grant	Moth	Martin Roth Remix	Anjunadeep	
2011	Soundprank & Jaytech	Pranktech	Original Mix	Anjunadeep	Release featured in EP "Anjunadeep 100 - The Collaborations EP"
2011	Jaytech	Paradox / Djembe	Original Mixes	Anjunadeep	
2011	Jaytech	New Vibe / Echo	Original Mixes	Anjunadeep	
2011	Jaytech	Overdrive / New Vibe	Overdrive (Original Mix)	Anjunadeep	
2011	Jaytech	Overdrive / New Vibe	Overdrive (PROFF Remix)	Anjunadeep	
2011	Jaytech	Overdrive / New Vibe	New Vibe (Giran's Old Vibe Mix)	Anjunadeep	
2012	Jaytech	Atlantic / Synergy	Original Mixes	Anjunadeep	
2012	Jaytech feat. Steve Smith	Stranger	Original Mix	Anjunabeats	1st single from 2nd studio album, "Multiverse", released on same Label.
2012	Jaytech feat. Steve Smith	Stranger (The Remixes)	Kyau & Albert Remix	Anjunabeats	
2012	Jaytech feat. Steve Smith	Stranger (The Remixes)	Michael Jay Parker Remix	Anjunabeats	
2012	Jaytech	Multiverse*	Club Mix	Anjunabeats	2nd single from 2nd studio album Multiverse, released on same Label.
2012	Jaytech	Multiverse*	Audien Remix	Anjunabeats	2nd single from 2nd studio album Multiverse, released on same Label.
2012	Jaytech	Multiverse*	Mimax Remix	Anjunabeats	2nd single from 2nd studio album Multiverse, released on same Label.
2013	Jaytech	Inception / Wipeout	Original Mixes	Anjunabeats	
2013	Jaytech	Labour Of Love feat. Nathan Grainger	Extended Mix	Anjunabeats	3rd single from 2nd studio album, "Multiverse", released on the same Label.
2013	Jaytech	Labour Of Love feat. Nathan Grainger	Club Mix	Anjunabeats	3rd single from 2nd studio album, "Multiverse", released on the same Label.
2013	Jaytech	Labour Of Love feat. Nathan Grainger	Matt Fax Remix	Anjunabeats	3rd single from 2nd studio album, "Multiverse", released on the same Label.
2013	Jaytech	Labour Of Love feat. Nathan Grainger	Suspect 44 Remix	Anjunabeats	3rd single from 2nd studio album, "Multiverse", released on the same Label.
2014	Jaytech	Megastructure / Earthbound	Original Mixes	Anjunabeats	
2014	Super8 & Tab vs. Jaytech	Code Red	Original Mix	Anjunabeats	
2014	Jaytech	Positronic EP	Tank Logic	Positronic Digital	
2014	Jaytech	Positronic EP	Entropy	Positronic Digital	
2014	Jaytech	Positronic EP	Electron	Positronic Digital	
2014	Jaytech	Positronic EP	Blackout	Positronic Digital	
2014	Jaytech	Afterburner	Original Mix	Positronic Digital	
2014	Jaytech	Afterburner	Club Dub	Positronic Digital	
2014	Jaytech	Ticon / Arrival	Original Mixes	Positronic Digital	
2015	Jaytech	Sidelines feat. Kailin	Original Mix	Positronic Digital	
2015	Jaytech	Sidelines feat. Kailin	Radio Edit	Positronic Digital	
2015	Jaytech & Matt Fax	Aeris	Original Mix	Positronic Digital	
2016	Jaytech & Judah	Visions feat. Kailin	Club Mix	Positronic Digital	1st single from 3rd studio album, Awakening, released on the same Label.
2016	Jaytech	Tiny Love feat. JHANA	Club Mix	Positronic Digital	2nd single from 3rd studio album, Awakening, released on the same Label.
2016	Jaytech	Paragon	Original Mix	Zerothree	Release featured in Compilation "Zerothree Presents #REALPROG V.2"
2016	Jaytech	Awakening*	Club Mix	Positronic Digital	3rd single from his 3rd studio album, Awakening, released on the same Label.
2016	Jaytech	Alpha / Zulu	Original Mixes	Positronic Digital	
2016	Jaytech	The Zerothree EP	Shine On Me	Zerothree	
2016	Jaytech	The Zerothree EP	Hyperloop	Zerothree	
2016	Jaytech	The Zerothree EP	On Your Roof	Zerothree	
2017	Jaytech	Tachyon	Original Mix	Positronic Digital	
2017	Jaytech	Show You EP	Show You ft. Tommy Murphy	Anjunabeats	
2017	Jaytech	Show You EP	Inspire	Anjunabeats	
2017	Jaytech	Show You EP	Haymaker	Anjunabeats	
2017	Jaytech & Judah	Boss Fight	Original Mix	Anjunabeats	
2017	Jaytech	Positronic EP 2	Sleepless Lights	Positronic Digital	
2017	Jaytech	Positronic EP 2	Troll's Orbit	Positronic Digital	
2017	Jaytech	Positronic EP 2	Cielo	Positronic Digital	
2017	Jaytech	Positronic EP 2	Yamatai	Positronic Digital	
2017	Jaytech	Positronic EP 2	Etheria	Positronic Digital	
2017	Jaytech	Rocinante	Original Mix	Anjunabeats	Release featured in sampler "Anjunabeats Worldwide O7 Sampler pt.1"
2017	Jaytech	Red Planet / Only Now	Original Mixes	Anjunabeats	
2018	Jaytech	Song of Fire EP	Song of Fire	Anjunabeats	
2018	Jaytech	Song of Fire EP	Song of Earth	Anjunabeats	
2018	Jaytech	Song of Fire EP	Song of Sky	Anjunabeats	
2018	Jaytech	Rekka / Infinite Reality	Original Mixes	Positronic Digital	
2018	Jaytech	Aftershock	Original Mix	Positronic Digital	
2018	Jaytech	Audiovirus / Transit of Venus	Original Mixes	Positronic Digital	
2018	Jaytech	Razer EP	Razer	Anjunabeats	
2018	Jaytech	Razer EP	Greater Love	Anjunabeats	
2018	Jaytech	Razer EP	System Ignition	Anjunabeats	
2019	Jaytech	Positronic EP 3	The Game	Positronic Digital	
2019	Jaytech	Positronic EP 3	Black Canyon	Positronic Digital	
2019	Jaytech	Positronic EP 3	Farsight	Positronic Digital	
2019	Jaytech	Positronic EP 3	Bastion	Positronic Digital	
2019	Jaytech	Voyage / Crystal Palace	Voyage	Positronic Digital	
2019	Jaytech	Voyage / Crystal Palace	Crystal Palace	Positronic Digital	
2019	Jaytech, Fatum, Genix, Judah	All In	Original Mix	Anjunabeats	
2019	Jaytech	Batumi / Tigerlily	Original Mixes	Anjunabeats	
2019	Jaytech	It's All Up To You	Original Mix	Positronic Digital	
2019	Jaytech	Mystic	Original Mix	Positronic Digital	
2020	Jaytech	The Infinite / EVA	The Infinite	Anjunabeats	
2020	Jaytech	The Infinite / EVA	EVA	Anjunabeats	
2020	Jaytech	Obelisk / Protomolecule / Tigerlily	Obelisk	Anjunabeats	
2020	Jaytech	Obelisk / Protomolecule / Tigerlily	Protomolecule	Anjunabeats	
2020	Jaytech	Obelisk / Protomolecule / Tigerlily	Tigerlily (CAAVA Remix)	Anjunabeats	
2020	Jaytech	The Axis / Lunero	Original Mixes	Positronic Digital	
2020	Jaytech	Feel Free EP	Feel Free	Anjunabeats	
2020	Jaytech	Feel Free EP	Sapphires	Anjunabeats	
2020	Jaytech	Feel Free EP	The Only One	Anjunabeats	
2020	Jaytech	Vortex / Midnight Sonora	Original Mixes	Positronic Digital	
2021	Jaytech	Dreamworld EP	Dreamworld	Anjunabeats	
2021	Jaytech	Dreamworld EP	Rave Totem	Anjunabeats	
2021	Jaytech	Dreamworld EP	Pacific	Anjunabeats	
2021	Jaytech	Amnesia Dreaming	Original Mix	Positronic Digital	
2021	Jaytech	Veridian	Original Mix	Positronic Digital	
2021	Jaytech	Galactic EP	Galactic	Anjunabeats	
2021	Jaytech	Galactic EP	Road to Nowhere	Anjunabeats	
2021	Jaytech	Galactic EP	Ukiyo	Anjunabeats	
2021	Jaytech	Galactic EP	Colossus	Anjunabeats	
2021	Jaytech	Galactic EP	Dreamworld (Paul Arcane Remix)	Anjunabeats	
2022	Fatum & Jaytech	Bait & Switch	Original Mix	Anjunabeats	Release featured in "Fatum's Anjunabeats Worldwide 10 Collaborations EP".
2023	Jaytech	Starflight EP		Anjunabeats	
2023	Jaytech	Starflight EP	The Night Sky	Positronic Digital	
2023	Jaytech	Starflight EP	Darkstar	Positronic Digital	
2023	Jaytech	Starflight EP	Halcyon	Positronic Digital	
2023	Jaytech	Starflight EP	The Night Sky (CONURES Remix)	Positronic Digital	
2023	Jaytech	Starflight EP	Darkstar (SKAWZ Remix)	Positronic Digital	
2023	Jaytech	Starflight EP	Halcyon (Codeswitch Remix)	Positronic Digital	

=== Remixes ===
Year	Original Artist(s)	Title	Label
2007	Above & Beyond	Home (Jaytech Remix)	Anjunabeats
2008	Above & Beyond presents Tranquility Base	Surrender (Jaytech Remix)	Anjunabeats
2008	Electrobios & Interplay	With You (Jaytech Remix)	Anjunadeep
2008	Snake Sedrick	Aha (Jaytech Remix)	Tilth
2008	Paul Keeley	A Sort Of Homecoming (Jaytech Saturday Mix)	Anjunadeep
2008	Paul Keeley	A Sort Of Homecoming (Jaytech Sunday Mix)	Anjunadeep
2008	Matt Rowan	Self Inflicted (Jaytech Remix)	Proton Music
2008	Dinka	Meaningful Story (Jaytech Remix)	Unreleased Digital
2008	Above & Beyond pres. OceanLab	Breaking Ties (Jaytech & James Grant Remix)	Anjunabeats
2009	Above & Beyond pres. OceanLab	If I Could Fly (Jaytech Remix)	Anjunabeats
2009	Boom Jinx & Oliver Smith	Sunrise (Jaytech Remix)	Anjunabeats
2009	Jonathan Allyn	Near You (Jaytech Remix)	AVA Recordings
2009	Solarity	Terminal 6 (Jaytech Remix)	Anjunadeep
2009	Christopher Manik	Pink Champagne (Jaytech Remix)	Harem Records
2010	Way Out West	We Love Machine (Jaytech Remix)	Hope Recordings
2010	Mango	Here We Go (Jaytech Remix)	Silk Music
2010	Andrew Bayer	The Taxi Driver (Jaytech Remix)	Anjunadeep
2011	Da Funk	Weekend Rubdown (Jaytech & James Grant Respray Mix)	Anjunadeep
2011	Super8 & Tab	Eternal Sequence (Jaytech Remix)	Anjunabeats
2011	Above & Beyond	Formula Rossa (Jaytech Remix)	Anjunabeats
2012	BT	Flaming June (Jaytech Remix)	Black Hole Recordings
2013	Blood Groove & Kikis	Mirage (Jaytech Remix)	Silk Music
2013	Julie Thompson & Super8 & Tab	Your Secret's Safe (Jaytech Remix)	Magik Muzik
2013	Fon.Leman	Lynx Eye (Jaytech Remix)	Intricate Records
2014	Myon & Shane54 + Late Night Alumni	Under Your Cloud (Jaytech Remix)	Ride Recordings
2014	Lea Luna	Crazy Pills (Jaytech Remix)	Magik Muzik
2015	Christian Q & Shokstix	Living in Stars (Jaytech Progressive Mix)	Positronic Digital
2015	Superb8 & Tab with 7skies	Rubicon (Jaytech Remix)	Anjunabeats
2016	Dezza	March of the Bird (Jaytech Remix)	Positronic Digital
2017	Mark Norman presents Celine	Colour My Eyes (Jaytech Remix)	Black Hole Recordings
2018	Matt Fax featuring Krysta Youngs	The Chase (Jaytech Remix)	Enhanced Musc
2021	Tilt	Invisible (Jaytech Remix)	Solar Storm
2021	Conjure One + Jaren	Animals (Jaytech Remix)	Black Hole Recordings
2022	Farius	A Big Life (Jaytech Remix)	Enhanced Progressive
2022	Siddhartha Says ft. Luke Moore	Tides (Jaytech Remix)	Positronic Digital
2022	Paravorik	Words (Jaytech Remix)	Songspire Records
2023	Tritonal	Metawave (Jaytech Remix)	Enhanced Recordings
2023	Nourey & FOSTER	Meant to Be (Jaytech Remix)	Anjunabeats
2023	Derek Ryan	Thrive (Jaytech Remix)	Ascent Recordings

=== Compilations ===
- Anjunadeep 02 (by Various Artists; mixed by Jaytech & James Grant) (22 March 2010)
- Anjunadeep 03 (by Various Artists; mixed by Jaytech & James Grant) (21 February 2011)
- Anjunadeep 04 (by Various Artists; mixed by Jaytech & James Grant) (27 February 2012)
- Positronic Collective (by Various Artists; mixed by Jaytech) (30 June 2015)
