= Kyau & Albert =

Trance music DJ / Producer Duo

- Origin: Germany
- Genres: Trance; Vocal trance
- Years active: 1990–present
- Labels: Euphonic and Anjunabeats
- Members: Ralph Kyau; Steven Moebius Albert
- Website: www.kyauandalbert.com

Kyau & Albert is the working name for two trance music producers and DJs from Germany named Ralph Kyau (German: [ˈkaɪu]) and Steven Moebius Albert. They were formerly known as Kyau vs. Albert but changed their working name to Kyau & Albert in 2006.

== History ==
Ralph Kyau had his first experience with the production of electronic music in 1990 and gained a reputation for DJing as well as Live PA sets at several underground techno parties in Germany before releasing his first record "Modulation Experiments" at the end of 1993.

Together with DJ Shandy he founded the label Harmony Recordings in 1993 and they signed the massive Mirco de Govia as their first act. At the same time, Steven Moebius Albert began to produce his own tracks and in the summer of 1994, Ralph and Steven met for the first time.

They produced their first tracks together for a live performance, realized that they have a common perception of music, and decided to try their hands at producing together. The result was their first single "Let me in" released in 1996. From then on they became known under the artist name of Kyau vs Albert. Their two small studios merged and they founded the music production company "Euphonic" in 1997, signing Sonorous a.k.a. Rough Mullar as well as Ronski Speed. With such a strong backing of producers, the team began pushing for their sound to be heard.

In 2000, the guise of Kyau vs Albert became recognized by WEA (part of Warner Music) and a long-term contract was put together, forming the start of their journey into dance music, with huge support from DJs such as Paul van Dyk, KayCee, Tiësto and many others.

In 2002, Sun Decade (one of Ronski Speed aliases) was released on the Euphonic label along with "I'm Alone".

To celebrate 15 years in the industrym Kyau & Albert released the album 15 Years In March 2012, an album of their popular tracks remixed by a selected group of contemporary trance artists as well as some of their brand new material.

The duo featured in the annual DJ Magazine Top 100 DJs poll for four consecutive years (2007-2010).

== Discography ==
=== Studio albums ===
- 2004 Here We Are Now
- 2006 Worldvibe
- 2013 Nights Awake
- 2015 Distant Lights
- 2016 20 Years
- 2017 Matching Stories
- 2018 Neverlost
- 2019 Euphonic 300
- 2024 All In Good Time

=== DJ mixes ===
- 2003 Kyau vs. Albert – Review
- 2004 Positive Ways 4
- 2004 Techno club Next 2
- 2005 This Is Trance 3
- 2006 From Euphonic To Russia
- 2007 Euphonic 10 Years

=== Compilations ===
- 2008 Euphonic 10 Years
- 2009 Best Of 2002-2009
- 2012 15 Years - The Album

=== Extended plays ===
- 2018 Neverlost, Part 1
- 2018 Neverlost, Part 2

=== Singles ===
- 1993 Kyau - Modulation Experiments [Xplode Records]
- 1994 Kyau - Overflyer [Harmony Records]
- 1994 Kyau - House Will [Harmony Records]
- 1996 Kyau vs. Albert - Let Me In [Harmony Records]
- 1997 Kyau vs. Albert - Rocket [Happy Vibes Records]
- 1998 Kyau vs. Albert - Let Me In (The Mixes) [Euphonic]
- 1998 Kyau vs. Albert - Lovemassacre [Euphonic]
- 1999 Moebius AG - Do What I Want [Rouge Pulp]
- 2000 Kyau vs. Albert - Great / Loebau [Euphonic]
- 2000 Kyau vs. Albert - LFO [Euphonic]
- 2000 Kyau vs. Albert - Euphonic [Euphonic]
- 2001 Kyau vs. Albert - Outside [WEA]
- 2001 Moebius AG - Come on Girl [ZYX Germany]
- 2002 Kyau vs. Albert - Save Me [WEA]
- 2003 Kyau vs. Albert - Velvet Morning [Euphonic]
- 2004 Kyau vs. Albert - Made Of Sun [Euphonic]
- 2004 Kyau vs. Albert Feat Julie - Not with You [Euphonic]
- 2006 Kyau vs. Albert - Kiksu [Euphonic]
- 2006 Kyau vs. Albert - Walk Down [Euphonic]
- 2006 Kyau vs. Albert - Are You Fine? [Euphonic]
- 2007 Kyau & Albert - Always a Fool [Euphonic]
- 2007 Kyau & Albert - Megashira [Euphonic]
- 2007 Kyau & Albert - 7Skies [Euphonic]
- 2008 Kyau & Albert with Marc Marberg - Orange Bill / Neo Love [EUPHORiC]
- 2008 Kyau & Albert - Hide & Seek [Euphonic]
- 2009 Kyau & Albert - Be There 4 U/Hooked On Infinity [Euphonic]
- 2009 Kyau & Albert with Marc Marberg - Grrreat [Euphonic]
- 2009 Kyau & Albert - I Love You [Euphonic]
- 2010 Kyau & Albert - Once in A Life (Release TBA!)
- 2010 Kyau & Albert - Painkillers [Euphonic]
- 2010 Kyau & Albert vs. Above & Beyond - Anphonic [Anjunabeats]
- 2011 Kyau & Albert - Barbizon [Euphonic]
- 2011 Kyau & Albert - On The Way [Euphonic], inspired by The U Movie film trailer
- 2011 Kyau & Albert - A Night like This [Euphonic]
- 2011 Kyau & Albert - 15 Years: Part One [Euphonic]
- 2011 Kyau & Albert - 15 Years: Part Two [Euphonic]
- 2011 Kyau & Albert - 15 Years: Part Three [Euphonic]
- 2011 Kyau & Albert - 15 Years: Part Four [Euphonic]
- 2011 Kyau & Albert - 15 Years: Part Five [Euphonic]
- 2012 Kyau & Albert - 15 Years: Part Six [Euphonic]
- 2012 Kyau & Albert - This Love [Euphonic]
- 2012 Marc Marberg with Kyau & Albert – Robotron [Euphonic]
- 2012 Kyau & Albert With Ronski Speed – Euphonia [Euphonic]
- 2012 Kyau & Albert - Another Time [Euphonic]
- 2012 Kyau & Albert - Glühwürmchen [Anjunabeats]
- 2013 Kyau & Albert - The One [Euphonic]
- 2013 Kyau & Albert With Stoneface & Terminal – We Own The Night [Euphonic]
- 2013 Kyau & Albert – All Your Colours [Euphonic]
- 2014 Kyau & Albert - Are You One of Us? [Euphonic]
- 2014 Kyau & Albert - Down [Euphonic]
- 2014 Kyau & Albert - Relevant Angel [Euphonic]
- 2014 Kyau & Albert - Nights Awake Remixes EP Part 1 [Euphonic]
- 2014 Kyau & Albert - Nights Awake Remixes EP Part 2 [Euphonic]
- 2015 Kyau & Albert - Follow The Waves [Euphonic]
- 2015 Kyau & Albert - Lover In The Dark [Euphonic]
- 2015 Kyau & Albert featuring Maria Nayler - Calming Rain [Euphonic]
- 2016 Kyau & Albert - About The Sun [Anjunabeats]
- 2016 Kyau & Albert - Memory Lane [Anjunabeats]
- 2016 Kyau & Albert – 20 Years (EP # 1) [Euphonic]
- 2016 Kyau & Albert – Sleeping Lions (Feat. In Gray) [Anjunabeats]
- 2017 Kyau & Albert - Trace [Euphonic]
- 2017 Kyau & Albert - Mein Herz [Euphonic]
- 2018 Kyau & Albert vs. Genix - Mantis [Anjunabeats]
- 2018 Kyau & Albert - Tube Hearts [Anjunabeats]
- 2018 Kyau & Albert with Steve Brian - Reverie [Euphonic]
- 2019 Kyau & Albert with Aly & Fila - Come Home [FSOE]
- 2019 Kyau & Albert - You Are All [Anjunabeats]
- 2019 Kyau & Albert - So True [Euphonic]
- 2020 Kyau & Albert - What It Takes [Euphonic]
- 2020 Kyau & Albert and Steve Brian - Candy [Euphonic]
- 2020 Kyau & Albert - Shimmer [Euphonic]
- 2020 Kyau & Albert - Beehive / Paper Towns [Anjunabeats]
- 2021 Kyau & Albert - Spüren [Euphonic]
- 2022 Kyau & Albert - Hearts Will Burn [Anjunabeats]

=== Remixes ===
- 1994 Mirco de Govia - Sumatra Rain
- 1997 DJ Happy Vibes - Wake Up
- 1997 Underground Children
- 1998 Spacewalker - Baywatch
- 1998 Elastique V - Cara Mia
- 2000 Sonorous - Glass Garden
- 2000 Taiko - Echo Drop
- 2001 Delicate - Close Your Eyes
- 2001 Elektrostar - Tides of Memories
- 2001 Flesh & Bones - Rigor Mortis
- 2001 KayCee - I feel You
- 2001 Kosheen - Catch
- 2001 Mirco de Govia - Epic Monolith
- 2002 Apoptygma Berzerk - Suffer in Silence
- 2002 David Forbes - Questions (Must be Asked)
- 2002 Mirco de Govia - Thing's That Matter
- 2002 Solid Sessions - Janeiro
- 2004 Young Parisians feat. Ben Lost - Jump The Next Train
- 2004 Blank & Jones - Waiting For The Light
- 2005 Ridgewalkers feat. EL - Find
- 2005 Ayumi Hamasaki [AYU] - Appears
- 2006 Oceanlab - Sirens of the sea
- 2006 Schiller mit Jette von Roth - Der Tag...Du Bist erwacht
- 2006 Gabriel & Dresden - Tracking Treasure Down
- 2007 Ronski Speed - Love All The Pain Away
- 2007 Cinema Bizarre - Lovesongs
- 2007 Sebastian Sand - Strange Bends
- 2008 Cressida - 6a.m.
- 2008 Paul van Dyk feat. Ashley Tomberlin - Complicated
- 2008 Lange feat. Sarah Howells - Out of the Sky
- 2009 Cosmic Gate - Flatline
- 2009 Stoneface and Terminal - Santiago
- 2010 Bent - As You Fall
- 2010 Super8 & Tab - Empire
- 2011 Armin van Buuren ft Ana Criado - Down To Love
- 2011 Kyau & Albert - Kiksu
- 2011 Ferry Corsten - Check It Out
- 2011 Above & Beyond featuring Zoë Johnston - You Got To Go
- 2012 Ronski Speed and Stine Grove - Run To The Sunlight
- 2018 Tritonal featuring Lourdiz - "Love U Right" (Kyau & Albert Remix)
- 2019 Kast - "Pager"

== Facts ==
Velvet Morning has been remixed by Mirco De Govia, Aalto and Super8 & Tab. In 2016, a remix by Genix was released in their 20 Years (EP # 1) marking 20 years of the duo.

Kyau & Albert host a monthly radio show called Euphonic Sessions, which is broadcast on the Internet radio station AH.FM and then later re-broadcast on other stations. The Podcast of Euphonic Sessions can be found on the iTunes (US) directory here.
