= Boom Jinx =

Norwegian DJ (born 1974)

- Birth name: Øistein Johan Eide
- Born: 10 September 1974 (age 51) Bergen, Norway
- Genres: Progressive house; progressive trance; deep trance; breaks; ambient
- Occupations: Producer; DJ
- Years active: 2005-present (as Boom Jinx)
- Labels: Anjunabeats, Anjunadeep, Armada Music, Enhanced Music, Intricate Records, Distinct'ive Records

Øistein Johan Eide (Norwegian pronunciation: [ˈœ̂ʏstæɪn jʊˈhɑnː ˈæ̂ɪdə]; born 10 September 1974 in Bergen), better known by his stage name Boom Jinx, is a Norwegian music producer and DJ.

== Career ==
In 1989, Boom Jinx started making music with SoundTracker developed for the Commodore Amiga computer. In 1991, he was hired as a freelancer to create music for a US game developer. In 2005, after a career in advertising, video games, television and film, he turned to dance music.

Boom Jinx's track "Manipulator" was featured as "a hot new track" on BBC Radio 1, and was licensed to the soundtrack of the television show CSI: Miami.

In 2009, Boom Jinx collaborated with San Francisco-based Trifonic to write music for Electronic Arts' Need for Speed: Shift. Tracks co-written with Trifonic were later licensed to CSI Las Vegas (episode #1215) in February 2012.

The music video for his 2013 single "When You Loved Me" was added to a playlist on MTV Dance.

== DJ ==
Boom Jinx has performed as a DJ in North and South America, Europe, Asia and Africa since 2009. He went on a 14-city US tour with Above & Beyond in 2009. He also went on solo tours in the USA in 2010 and 2013, two tours in India in 2011, and a Russian tour in 2012. He also had a solo tour of the US in 2014.

Boom Jinx was voted #296 worldwide in DJ Magazine's Top 100 DJs poll in 2010. He ranked #171 Trance DJ worldwide according to TopDeejays.com June 2014. He was also named #106 in Trance worldwide according to The DJ List.

== No Answers In Luck (2015) ==
Boom Jinx released an artist album called No Answers In Luck on Anjunabeats in 2015, featuring Justine Suissa, Teebee & Calyx, Matt Lange, and Thomas J. Bergersen.

== Discography ==
=== Anjunabeats releases ===
- 2008 Boom Jinx feat. Key - Eternal Reminiscence [Original and Oliver Smith Mixes] (Anjunabeats)
- 2009 Boom Jinx & Oliver Smith - Sunrise [Original and Jaytech Mixes] (Anjunabeats)
- 2009 Boom Jinx & Oliver Smith - Sunrise [Joost van der Vleuten's Sunset Remix] (Anjunabeats)
- 2011 Boom Jinx feat. Justine Suissa - Phoenix From The Flames [Club and Omnia & The Blizzard Mixes] (Anjunabeats)
- 2011 Boom Jinx feat. Justine Suissa - Phoenix From The Flames [Maor Levi and Michael Cassette Mixes] (Anjunabeats)
- 2013 Boom Jinx, Maor Levi & Ashley Tomberlin - When You Loved Me [Original and Remixes] (Anjunabeats)
- 2014 Boom Jinx & Meredith Call - The Dark [Original and Radio Mixes] (Anjunabeats)
- 2014 Boom Jinx & Meredith Call - The Dark [The Remixes] (Anjunabeats)
- 2015 Boom Jinx & Meredith Call - Bring Me Back Around [Original and Radio Mixes] (Anjunabeats)

=== Anjunadeep releases ===
- 2006 Boom Jinx - Come Play Perfect / Too Free To Follow [Original Mixes] (Anjunadeep)
- 2006 Boom Jinx - Too Free To Follow [Posh Mix] (Anjunadeep)
- 2007 Boom Jinx feat. Thomas J. Bergersen - Remember September [Original and Duderstadt Mixes] (Anjunadeep)
- 2008 Boom Jinx - Too Free To Follow [Posh Mix] [Stephen J. Kroos Remix] (Anjunadeep)
- 2009 Boom Jinx & Andrew Bayer - To The Six [Original and Matt Lange Mixes] (Anjunadeep)
- 2009 Boom Jinx & Andrew Bayer - To The Six [Club & Martin Roth Mixes] (Anjunadeep)
- 2009 Boom Jinx & Jaytech - Milano [Original and Ad Brown Mixes] (Anjunadeep)
- 2010 Boom Jinx & Andrew Bayer - By All Means / So It Goes [Original and Club Mixes] (Anjunadeep)
- 2010 Boom Jinx & Andrew Bayer - Keyboard Cowboys [Original and Jay Lumen Mixes] (Anjunadeep)
- 2010 Boom Jinx & Andrew Bayer - Fracture [Original, David West and Paul Beckwith Mixes] (Anjunadeep)
- 2010 Boom Jinx & Andrew Bayer vs. Trifonic & Matt Lange - Quadcore [Original and Steve Duda Mixes] (Anjunadeep)
- 2011 Boom Jinx & Andrew Bayer - By All Means [Solarity Remix] (Anjunadeep)
- 2011 Boom Jinx & Soundprank - Pieces Of The Puzzle [Original and Solarity Mixes] (Anjunadeep)

=== Other releases ===
- 2006 Boom Jinx - Suncast [Original, Rune Lindbaek, Lee Coombs, Neophasic, NineLives The Cat and Molomekaniske Remix] (Ruthless Recordings)
- 2006 Boom Jinx - Come On Over [Original and Dub Mixes] (Play Recordings)
- 2006 Boom Jinx - Manipulator [Original and (Praesul Records)
- 2007 Boom Jinx - Flicker [Original, Shiloh Mixes and Joel Armstrong Mixes] (Hunya Munya Records)
- 2010 Boom Jinx pres. BJX - Suncast [Original, Rune Lindbaek, Lee Coombs, Neophasic, NineLives The Cat and Molomekaniske Remix] (Distinctive Records]
- 2010 Boom Jinx pres. BJX - Come On Over [Club Dub, Dub Menace and Plaza De Funk Mixes] (Distinctive Records)
- 2010 Boom Jinx pres. BJX - Manipulator / Think Fast / The Blueberry Bounce [Original and Opencloud Mixes] (Distinctive Records)
- 2012 Boom Jinx & Daniel Kandi - Azzura [Original Mix] (Enhanced Recordings)
- 2014 Boom Jinx & Judah - Please Believe Me [Radio Edit] (Armada Music)
- 2014 Boom Jinx & PROFF - Blue Angel [Original and Remixes] (Intricate Records)
- 2018 Z:N vs Boom Jinx & Katrine Stenbekk - Come Alive [Original Mix, Deep Vocal Mix and Deep Dub Mix] (Silk Music)
- 2023 Thomas Bergersen & Boom Jinx - Am I Real [Original Mix] (Nemesis Productions LLC)

=== Remixes ===
- 2005 Tilt - New Day [Boom Jinx Remix] (Lost Language)
- 2005 Tilt - New Day [Boom Jinx Dub] (Lost Language)
- 2006 Kyau vs. Albert - Kiksu [Boom Jinx Remix] (Anjunabeats)
- 2006 Can Costa & Josh Collins - Peyote Ugly [Boom Jinx Now! Mix] (CPR Digital)
- 2006 Jacob Todd & Jordan Nafie - Shattered [Boom Jinx's Los Locos Mix] (CP Recordings)
- 2006 Kyau & Albert - Kiksu [Boom Jinx Remix] (Euphonic)
- 2007 David West Ft. Inkfish - Searching For Substance [Boom Jinx Remix] (West Recordings)
- 2008 DJ Ella Shine Like A Superstar - [Boom Jinx Remix] (Microphone Records)
- 2008 LP Feat. Ashley Lawson - Clique [Boom Jinx Remix] (Shiznit Recordings)
- 2009 Hybrid - Finished Symphony [Boom Jinx Remix] (Distinctive Records)
- 2010 Zenith Nadir feat. Katana - Forever [Boom Jinx Club Mix] (Studio Kitty Recordings)
- 2011 Steve Duda - Fish [Boom Jinx & Andrew Bayer Remix] (Xfer Records)
- 2013 Dusky feat. Janai - Lost in you [Boom Jinx Remix] (Anjunadeep)

== Labels ==
Boom Jinx is currently signed to Anjunabeats with additional releases on Anjunadeep, Armada Music, Enhanced Music, Intricate Records, Distinct'ive Records and Silk Music.
