= Anjunabeats =

British record label

- Founded: 2000
- Founder: Jono Grant; Paavo Siljamäki
- Status: Active
- Genre: Electronic; trance; progressive trance; progressive house
- Location: London, England
- Official website: anjunabeats.com

Anjunabeats (/ænˈdʒuːnəˌbiːts/, an-JOO-nə-beets) is a British record label started in 2000 by producers Jonathan "Jono" Grant and Paavo Siljamäki of Above & Beyond. Initially, Anjunabeats was only a trance music label, and it started releasing trance-edged house in 2011. The name Anjuna comes from the name of a beach in Goa, India.

== History ==
In 2000, Anjunabeats released its first 12" record, titled Volume One, which was released under Grant and Siljamäki's alias Anjunabeats. As the label got the name Anjunabeats, they decided to produce under different aliases, such as Free State and Dirt Devils. They were soon joined by Tony McGuinness in 2000 after he was asked to collaborate on a remix of Chakra's "Home" and formed Above & Beyond.

In 2005, Above & Beyond launched the sub-label Anjunadeep, aimed at releases that do not fit under the main label's trance focus, allowing more diversity within Anjunabeats.

On 3 October 2017, Anjunabeats announced a collaboration with Beatport to host a production competition titled "Beats In School", in which the winner will earn a year-long mentorship with Anjunabeats artists. Canadian Joel Freck was named as the winner on 10 January 2018, among 20 contest finalists.

In March 2018, Anjunabeats launched a 24/7 radio station on YouTube, which features tracks from their label discography including trance and deep house.

== Artists ==
- 16BL (also released as 16 Bit Lolitas)
- 3lau
- Above & Beyond
- Alan Fitzpatrick
- Amy Wiles
- Anamē
- Andrew Bayer
- Antic
- Anuqram
- Anyasa
- Arty (also released as Alpha 9)
- Asbjørn
- Audien
- Avenue One
- Ben Böhmer
- Boerd
- Boom Jinx
- Braxton
- Catching Flies
- CRi
- Cristoph
- Croquet Club
- Cubicolor
- Dan Stone
- Darren Tate
- David Hohme
- Dosem
- Dusky
- Eli & Fur
- Enamour
- Eximinds
- Ezeqiel Arias
- Fluida
- Franky Wah
- Frost
- Gabriel & Dresden
- Gardenstate
- Genix
- Giuseppe de Luca
- Grum
- GVN
- Hosini
- Ilan Bluestone (also released as Elysian)
- James Grant
- Jaytech
- Joda
- Jody Wisternoff
- John Monkman
- Jon Gurd
- Joseph Ray
- Just Her
- Justine Suissa
- Kasablanca
- Khen
- Kidnap
- Lakou Mizik
- Lane 8
- Le Youth
- Leaving Laurel
- Luttrell
- Lycoriscoris
- Mangal Suvarnan
- Maor Levi
- Marsh
- Martin Roth
- Mat Zo
- Matt Fax
- Matt Lange
- Modd
- Monkey Safari
- Moon Boots
- M.O.S.
- My Friend
- Naz
- Nicky Elisabeth
- Nils Hoffmann
- Nitrous Oxide
- Norin & Rad
- Nourey
- Nox Vahn
- Nuage
- Olan
- Oliver Smith
- Pretty Pink
- Proff
- Promnite
- Qrion
- Rezident
- Richie Blacker
- Romain Garcia
- Simon Doty
- Solomon Grey
- Sønin
- Spencer Brown
- Sunny Lax
- The Sei
- Tim Mason
- Tinlicker
- Trance Wax
- Vincenzo
- Way Out West
- Yotto

== Awards ==
Award	Category	Recipient(s)	Year	Result
International Dance Music Awards	Best Global Dance Record Label	Anjunabeats	2009	Nominated
International Dance Music Awards	Best Global Dance Record Label	Anjunabeats	2010	Nominated
International Dance Music Awards	Best Global Dance Record Label	Anjunabeats	2012	Nominated
International Dance Music Awards	Best Global Dance Record Label	Anjunabeats	2015	Nominated
International Dance Music Awards	Best Global Dance Record Label	Anjunabeats	2016	Nominated
Grammy Awards	Best Dance/Electronic Album	Mat Zo – Damage Control	2015	Nominated
Grammy Awards	Best Dance Recording	Above & Beyond – "We're All We Need" (featuring Zoë Johnston)	2016	Nominated
Grammy Awards	Best Dance Recording	Above & Beyond – "Northern Soul" (featuring Richard Bedford)	2019	Nominated

== See also ==
- List of record labels
