= The Best of Armin Only =

2017 compilation album by Armin van Buuren

Compilation album by Armin van Buuren
- Released: 13 May 2017
- Genre: Trance, progressive trance
- Length: 2:09:00
- Label: Armada Music
- Producer: Armin van Buuren

Armin van Buuren chronology
A State of Trance 2017 (2017)	The Best of Armin Only (2017)	A State of Trance Ibiza 2017 (2017)

The Best of Armin Only is a compilation album by Dutch DJ and record producer Armin van Buuren. It was released on 13 May 2017 by Armada Music. The album was issued in connection with van Buuren's The Best of Armin Only concerts at the Amsterdam Arena, which marked twenty years of his solo career.

The album includes previously released tracks, new versions and exclusive recordings connected to the Armin Only concert series. Its official anthem, "My Symphony", was released ahead of the album. The Best of Armin Only peaked at number three on the Dutch Album Top 100, number 102 on the Belgian Ultratop Flanders albums chart, and number 19 on the UK Official Dance Albums Chart.

== Background and release ==
In November 2016, van Buuren announced The Best of Armin Only as a large-scale solo show in the Netherlands to celebrate the twentieth anniversary of his solo career. The concerts were held at the Amsterdam Arena on 12 and 13 May 2017. The album was promoted as a two-disc release containing both classic material and exclusive records, and was also made available physically as part of The Best of Armin Only Special Box.

== Track listing ==
Track listing adapted from Discogs. Apple Music lists the album as 30 songs by grouping the five "Overture" movements into one track.

Disc one – Exclusives
No.	Title	Length
1.	"Overture (The Best of Armin Only) – I. Imagine"	2:26
2.	"Overture (The Best of Armin Only) – II. Mirage"	2:08
3.	"Overture (The Best of Armin Only) – III. Sail"	1:00
4.	"Overture (The Best of Armin Only) – IV. Embrace" (with Eric Vloeimans)	4:48
5.	"Overture (The Best of Armin Only) – V. Intense" (with Miri Ben-Ari)	5:15
6.	"My Symphony" (The Best of Armin Only Anthem)	3:10
7.	"I Need You" (with Garibay featuring Olaf Blackwood) (Miami Edit)	4:18
8.	"Alone" (featuring Lauren Evans) (Arena Mix)	4:12
9.	"Never Say Never" (featuring Jacqueline Govaert) (Super8 & Tab Remix)	3:38
10.	"Drowning" (featuring Laura V) (Fatum Remix)	3:50
11.	"In and Out of Love" (featuring Sharon den Adel) (2017 revision)	3:03
12.	"Orbion" (2017 revision)	3:30
13.	"This Light Between Us" (featuring Christian Burns) (Feel Banging Remix)	3:47
14.	"I Live for That Energy" (ASOT 800 Anthem)	3:18
15.	"Great Spirit" (vs. Vini Vici featuring Hilight Tribe)	3:36
16.	"Dominator" (with Human Resource) (Festival Mix)	2:30
17.	"Ping Pong" (Arena Mix)	4:56
18.	"Yet Another Day" (featuring Ray Wilson) (UCast Remix)	3:51
19.	"This Is What It Feels Like" (featuring Trevor Guthrie) (Armin van Buuren Mashup)	4:00

Disc two – Classics
No.	Title	Length
1.	"Hymne"	2:51
2.	"Sail"	3:38
3.	"Sound of the Drums" (featuring Laura Jansen)	3:56
4.	"Not Giving Up on Love" (versus Sophie Ellis-Bextor) (Dash Berlin 4AM Mix)	4:59
5.	"Another You" (featuring Mr. Probz) (Festival Mix)	4:43
6.	"If It Ain't Dutch" (with W&W)	2:53
7.	"Heading Up High" (featuring Kensington) (First State Remix)	3:52
8.	"Save My Night"	2:52
9.	"Love You More" (featuring Racoon)	3:44
10.	"This World Is Watching Me" (vs. Rank 1 featuring Kush)	3:22
11.	"Freefall" (featuring BullySongs) (Manse Remix)	2:33
12.	"Serenity" (featuring Jan Vayne)	2:57
13.	"Blue Fear"	3:40
14.	"Shivers" (featuring Susana) (Alex M.O.R.P.H. Red Light Dub)	4:00
15.	"Communication Part 3"	3:20

== Charts ==
Chart performance for The Best of Armin Only
Chart (2017)	Peak position
Dutch Albums (Album Top 100)	3
Belgian Albums (Ultratop Flanders)	102
UK Dance Albums (Official Charts Company)	19
