= I'll Listen =

2012 song by Armin van Buuren

Single by Armin van Buuren featuring Ana Criado

from the album Universal Religion Chapter 6
- Released: 10 September 2012
- Studio: Armada Studios, Amsterdam
- Genre: Vocal trance
- Length: 3:36 (radio edit); 7:22 (original mix)
- Label: Armind; Armada
- Songwriter(s): Armin van Buuren; Benno de Goeij
- Producer(s): Armin van Buuren; Benno de Goeij

Armin van Buuren singles chronology
"We Are Here to Make Some Noise" (2012)	"I'll Listen" (2012)	"Waiting for the Night" (2013)

Ana Criado singles chronology
"No One Home" (2012)	"I'll Listen" (2012)	"Whispers" (2012)

"I'll Listen" is a song by Dutch DJ and record producer Armin van Buuren. It features vocals and lyrics from Anglo-Spanish singer and songwriter Ana Criado. The song was released in the Netherlands by Armind as a digital download on 10 September 2012. The song is included in van Buuren's compilation Universal Religion Chapter 6.

== Background ==
It is the third collaboration between van Buuren and Criado, after the songs "Down to Love" in 2010 (included in the album Mirage) and "Suddenly Summer" in 2012 (included in the compilation A State of Trance 2012).

== Reviews ==
The website "Trance History" considers "I'll Listen" as "one of the most interesting vocal trance tracks of 2012".

== Music video ==
A music video to accompany the track was released to YouTube on 21 September 2012. It is a video mix taken from a concert at Privilege Ibiza with Armin van Buuren and Ana Criado during summer 2012.

== Track listing ==
- Digital download (ARMD1132)
1. "I'll Listen" (original mix) – 7:22
2. "I'll Listen" (radio edit) – 3:36
- Remixes – digital download (ARMD1134)
1. "I'll Listen" (Super8 & Tab remix) – 7:14
2. "I'll Listen" (John O'Callaghan dark mix) – 7:05
3. "I'll Listen" (Disfunktion remix) – 6:13
4. "I'll Listen" (Super8 & Tab radio edit) – 3:28
5. "I'll Listen" (John O'Callaghan dark edit) – 3:42
6. "I'll Listen" (Disfunktion radio edit) – 3:33

== Charts ==
Chart (2012)	Peak position
Russia (Tophit)	194
