= Universal Religion Chapter 7 =

Compilation album by Armin van Buuren
- Released: 13 September 2013
- Recorded: 12 August 2013
- Genres: Trance; progressive trance; progressive house
- Length: Part 1: 76:46; Part 2: 75:46
- Label: Armada

Armin van Buuren chronology
Intense (2013)	Universal Religion Chapter 7 (2013)	A State of Trance 2014 (2014)

Universal Religion Chapter 7 is the seventh and the last compilation the Universal Religion compilation series mixed and compiled by Dutch DJ and record producer Armin van Buuren (Updating it' s format in the 2017 for each set of Armin van Buuren in Hï Ibiza). It was released on 13 September 2013 by Armada Music.

== Track listing ==
Live Continuous Mix Part 1
No.	Title	Artist	Length
1.	"Theatrum" (Intro Rework Edit)	Antony Waldhorn	3:50
2.	"Character" (Radio Edit)	Mark Sixma	3:45
3.	"Lakota" (ilan Bluestone Radio Edit)	CE3SAR	3:26
4.	"Gladius" (Radio Edit)	Arisen Flame	3:35
5.	"Dreams" (Radio Edit)	Alex M.O.R.P.H. and Natalie Gioia	4:22
6.	"Aureolo" (Radio Edit)	Rex Mundi	3:41
7.	"Downpipe" (Armin van Buuren Radio Edit)	Mark Knight and D. Ramirez vs. Underworld	3:46
8.	"Beautiful Life" (Protoculture Radio Edit)	Armin van Buuren featuring Cindy Alma	3:51
9.	"Violetta" (Radio Edit)	Orjan Nilsen	3:15
10.	"Immersion" (Original Mix Edit)	Omnia	3:50
11.	"The Other Side" (Radio Edit)	Skytech	2:59
12.	"Rise Again" (Omnia Remix)	Ronski Speed featuring Lucy Saunders	6:11
13.	"World Falls Apart" (Jorn van Deynhoven Radio Edit)	Dash Berlin featuring Jonathan Mendelsohn	3:16
14.	"Euphoria" (Radio Edit)	Eximinds	3:27
15.	"The Evil ID" (Radio Edit)	Max Graham	3:45
16.	"Until The End" (Club Edit)	Andrew Rayel and Jwaydan	3:30
17.	"Universal Religion Chapter 7" (Live Continuous Mix, Pt. 1)	Armin van Buuren	76:46
Total length:			76:46

Live Continuous Mix Part 2
No.	Title	Artist	Length
18.	"Dark Warrior" (Radio Edit)	Andrew Rayel	2:53
19.	"Ragnarok" (Radio Edit)	Ralphie B	3:59
20.	"A Cry To The Moon" (Radio Edit)	ECO	4:26
21.	"Eternal Flame" (Solarstone Pure Radio Edit)	Alex M.O.R.P.H.	3:48
22.	"Black Hole" (Jorn van Deynhoven Radio Edit)	Craig Connelly and Christina Novelli	3:59
23.	"The Queen" (Radio Edit)	Wach	3:29
24.	"The One" (Radio Edit)	Simon Patterson featuring Lucy Pullin	3:14
25.	"Six Zero Zero" (Radio Edit)	Jorn van Deynhoven	3:39
26.	"First Coming" (Ian Standerwick Remix)	Ciro Visone	8:52
27.	"We Are Not Afraid Of 138" (Radio Edit)	Andrew Rayel and Alexandre Bergheau	3:28
28.	"Silhouette" (Allen & Envy Radio Edit)	Dart Rayne and Yura Moonlight and Sarah Lynn	3:38
29.	"Apprehension" (Aly & Fila Mix)	Sergey Nevone and Simon O'Shine	8:00
30.	"Who's Afraid of 138?!" (Photographer Radio Edit)	Armin van Buuren	3:36
31.	"Freaked" (Original Mix - Armin van Buuren mashup with Skyfire)	Jase Thirlwall	8:38
32.	"Skyfire" (Official Radio Edit - Armin van Buuren mashup with Freaked)	Shogun	2:27
33.	"Airport" (Radio Edit - Armin van Buuren mashup with Shivers)	Photographer	4:42
34.	"Shivers" (Radio Edit - Armin van Buuren mashup with Airport)	Armin van Buuren featuring Susana	3:09
35.	"Beyond The Time" (Radio Edit)	A.R.D.I.	3:51
36.	"Universal Religion Chapter 7" (Live Continuous Mix, Pt. 2)	Armin van Buuren	75:46
Total length:			75:46

== Charts ==
Chart (2013)	Peak position
Dutch Albums (Album Top 100)	2
