= Intense =

Studio album by Armin van Buuren
- Released: 3 May 2013
- Genre: Uplifting trance; progressive trance
- Length: 79:11
- Label: Armada
- Producer: Armin van Buuren; Benno de Goeij; NERVO; Jenson Vaughan

Armin van Buuren chronology
A State of Trance 2013 (2013)	Intense (2013)	Universal Religion Chapter 7 (2013)

Singles from Intense
- 1. "Waiting for the Night" Released: 21 January 2013; 2. "This Is What It Feels Like" Released: 5 April 2013; 3. "Beautiful Life" Released: 20 September 2013; 4. "Intense" Released: 22 November 2013; 5. "Save My Night" Released: 6 January 2014; 6. "Alone" Released: 11 February 2014; 7. "Humming the Lights" Released: 21 August 2014

Intense is the fifth studio album by Dutch DJ and record producer Armin van Buuren. It was released on 3 May 2013 by Armada Music.

The first song announced to be on the album is "Waiting for the Night", featuring the singer Fiora, which was released on 21 January 2013 as the theme song to the Dutch film Loving Ibiza (Verliefd op Ibiza). The second song announced to be on the album is "Forever is Ours", featuring the singer Emma Hewitt. The third song and first official single to be released is "This Is What It Feels Like", featuring the Canadian singer and songwriter Trevor Guthrie, was released on 5 April 2013. The accompanying music video, featuring Ron Jeremy, was released on 17 March 2013.

The album was first released exclusively on Spotify on 29 April 2013, followed by its official release on digital and physical media on 3 May 2013. An extended version of the album, called Intense (The More Intense Edition), was released on 12 November 2013. This album contains remixes from musicians such as John Ewbank, Andrew Rayel, W&W, Cosmic Gate, Tritonal, Ummet Ozcan, Arctic Moon, and Ørjan Nilsen, along with radio edits, music videos, as well as two new songs from Armin van Buuren: "Save My Night" and "Don't Want to Fight Love Away" featuring Cindy Alma.

== Composition ==
Armin van Buuren described genre composition of Intense as "more house-y electro stuff and of course trance, some rock influence, even a little bit of dubstep and classical music in there" during an interview with British DJ Pete Tong.

== Track listing ==
All tracks produced by Armin van Buuren and Benno de Goeij. Except "Turn This Love Around" produced by Armin van Buuren, Olivia Nervo, Miriam Nervo and Benno de Goeij. Vocal production on "This Is What It Feels Like" by Jenson Vaughan.

No.	Title	Writer(s)	Length
1.	"Intense" (featuring Miri Ben-Ari)	Armin van Buuren; Benno de Goeij	8:47
2.	"This Is What It Feels Like" (featuring Trevor Guthrie)	van Buuren; de Goeij; Jenson Vaughan; Trevor Guthrie; John Ewbank	3:23
3.	"Beautiful Life" (featuring Cindy Alma)	van Buuren; de Goeij; Cindy Alma; Paul Barry	6:08
4.	"Waiting for the Night" (featuring Fiora)	van Buuren; de Goeij; Fiora Cutler	4:29
5.	"Pulsar"	van Buuren; de Goeij	6:31
6.	"Sound of the Drums" (featuring Laura Jansen)	van Buuren; de Goeij; Laura Jansen; Ewbank	3:56
7.	"Alone" (featuring Lauren Evans)	van Buuren; de Goeij; Victoria Horn; Lauren Evans; D'Mile	4:03
8.	"Turn This Love Around" (vs. NERVO featuring Laura V.)	van Buuren; de Goeij; Miriam Nervo; Olivia Nervo	5:22
9.	"Won't Let You Go" (featuring Aruna)	van Buuren; de Goeij; Aruna Abrams	6:35
10.	"In 10 Years from Now"	van Buuren; de Goeij	0:56
11.	"Last Stop Before Heaven"	van Buuren; de Goeij	6:27
12.	"Forever is Ours" (featuring Emma Hewitt)	van Buuren; de Goeij; Emma Hewitt	6:41
13.	"Love Never Came" (featuring Richard Bedford)	van Buuren; de Goeij; Richard Bedford	7:00
14.	"Who's Afraid of 138?!"	van Buuren; de Goeij	5:45
15.	"Reprise" (featuring Bagga Bownz)	van Buuren; de Goeij	3:12
Total length:			79:18

iTunes bonus tracks
No.	Title	Writer(s)	Length
16.	"Humming the Lights" (Armin van Buuren presents Gaia)	van Buuren; de Goeij	6:57
17.	"Don't Want To Fight Love Away" (featuring Cindy Alma)	van Buuren; de Goeij; Cindy Alma	7:22
Total length:			93:37

== Charts and certifications ==
=== Weekly charts ===
Chart (2013)	Peak position
Austrian Albums (Ö3 Austria)	20
Belgian Albums (Ultratop Flanders)	15
Belgian Albums (Ultratop Wallonia)	42
Canadian Albums (Billboard)	18
German Albums (Offizielle Top 100)	16
Irish Albums (IRMA)	72
Dutch Albums (Album Top 100)	2
Polish Albums (ZPAV)	7
Spanish Albums (PROMUSICAE)	82
Swiss Albums (Schweizer Hitparade)	26
UK Albums (OCC)	37
UK Dance Albums (OCC)	8
US Billboard 200	65
US Top Dance Albums (Billboard)	2
US Digital Albums (Billboard)	25
US Independent Albums (Billboard)	13

=== Year-end charts ===
Chart (2013)	Position
Belgian Albums (Ultratop Flanders)	125
Dutch Albums (Album Top 100)	6

=== Certifications ===
Region	Certification	Certified units/sales
Netherlands (NVPI)	Gold	25,000^{^}
Poland (ZPAV)	Gold	10,000^{*}
^{*} Sales figures based on certification alone.^{^} Shipments figures based on certification alone.
