= The Expedition (A State of Trance 600 Anthem) =

Single by Armin van Buuren and Markus Schulz

from the album A State of Trance 2013
- Released: 28 January 2013
- Studio: Armada Studios, Amsterdam
- Genre: Uplifting trance
- Length: 2:48 (Radio Edit); 7:02 (Original Mix)
- Label: A State of Trance; Armada
- Songwriters: Armin van Buuren; Benno de Goeij; Markus Schulz
- Producers: Armin van Buuren; Benno de Goeij; Markus Schulz

Armin van Buuren singles chronology
"Waiting for the Night" (2013)	"The Expedition" (2013)	"D# Fat" (2013)

Markus Schulz singles chronology
"Nothing Without Me" (2012)	"The Expedition" (2013)	"The Spiritual Gateway" (2013)

"The Expedition" is an instrumental composition by Dutch DJ and record producer Armin van Buuren and German DJ and record producer Markus Schulz. It was the official anthem of A State of Trance 600 festival in 2013. The song was released in the Netherlands by A State of Trance as a digital download on 28 January 2013 as the first single from van Buuren's compilation A State of Trance 2013.

== Background ==
According to Markus Schulz, the track "tells the story of the whole night in that one song".

== Reception ==
Blake Wilson from webmedia Relentless Beats notices that "Like most other Armin collaborations, the two find a way to mold their sounds into a single track, yet both keep each artists individual style. ‘The Expedition’ has Markus’s known emotional builds that takes any audience on a roller coaster of emotions and Armin’s intense, trancier-than-thou drops that have made his shows so amazing. Combine those with a soothing female voice synth in the back and a trance classic is born."

Webmedia YourEDM published a review of the remixes of the track. For the Ørjan Nilsen Remix, the critics find that they "can see Ørjan‘s evolving sound from true trance to high energy, peak-time hits that will surely cause damage on the floors". They compare this remix with Leon Bolier's works and his massive "fat bass kicks". For the KhoMha Remix, they consider that KhoMha‘s sound puts a certain weight upon your body and pressurizes your ears to the point of no return". For the Andrew Rayel Remix, they judge that "it is a highly emotionally charged remix with lush chords and beautiful vocals, with that little bit of power and edge that is a signature characteristic of Rayel". For the Indecent Noise Remix, they feel surprised that "he [...] pulls a fast, machine gun like synth into the spotlight to which follows an unforgiving bass kick and signature techy block hits".

== Music video ==
A music video to accompany the release of "The Expedition" was first released onto YouTube on 12 February 2013. The video is an animation starring astronauts who visit the cities where ASOT 600 tour dates take place.

== Track listing ==
- Digital download - A State of Trance 600 Anthem (ASOT209)
1. "The Expedition" (Original Mix) – 7:02
2. "The Expedition" (Radio Edit) - 2:48
- Digital download - Remixes (ASOT210)
1. "The Expedition" (Ørjan Nilsen Remix) – 6:15
2. "The Expedition" (Andrew Rayel Remix) – 6:56
3. "The Expedition" (KhoMha Remix) - 7:07
4. "The Expedition" (Indecent Noise Remix) - 7:11

== Charts ==
Chart (2013)	Peak position
Russia (Tophit)	195
