= Simple Modern Answers =

Studio album by Christian Burns
- Released: 25 October 2013
- Length: 69:29; 76:06 with bonus tracks
- Label: Armada Music
- Producer: Christian Burns

Singles from Simple Modern Answers
- 1. "This Light Between Us" Released: 12 November 2010 (for Mirage); 2. "Bullet" Released: 2 July 2012; 3. "As We Collide" Released: 29 October 2012; 4. "Perfectly" Released: 25 February 2013; 5. "One Thousand Suns" Released: 19 April 2013; 6. "We Are Tonight" Released: 2 September 2013; 7. "Frozen Heart (Big Room Mix)" Released: 24 March 2014

Simple Modern Answers is the first solo album by BBMak member Christian Burns, released on 25 October 2013. It features collaborations with electronic musicians such as Armin van Buuren, Paul van Dyk, BT, and others.

== Track listing ==
No.	Title	Artist	Length
1.	"One Thousand Suns" (Soundprank Vocal Mix)	Chicane & Ferry Corsten featuring Christian Burns	2:55
2.	"Then There Were None"	Christian Burns with Conjure One	5:47
3.	"Knife Games (Throwing Daggers)"	Christian Burns with Protoculture	4:48
4.	"The Enemy"	Christian Burns with BT	5:58
5.	"Bullet"	Christian Burns with Stefan Dabruck	3:24
6.	"Kingdom Castle Ruins"	Christian Burns	4:21
7.	"We Are Tonight"	Christian Burns with Paul van Dyk	4:34
8.	"As We Collide"	Christian Burns with Paul Oakenfold & JES	3:28
9.	"Perfectly"	Christian Burns with Maison & Dragen	3:44
10.	"Frozen Heart"	Christian Burns with Marco V	4:54
11.	"Particles"	Christian Burns	4:13
12.	"Lovers Till the End"	Christian Burns with Jean Claude Ades	5:05
13.	"Kick Out the Jams"	Christian Burns	3:17
14.	"Come Home"	Christian Burns with Kryder	3:43
15.	"Secret Universe" (Woody van Eyden Remix)	Christian Burns with Alex M.O.R.P.H.	4:09
16.	"This Light Between Us"	Christian Burns with Armin van Buuren	5:09
Total length:			69:29

iTunes Bonus Tracks
No.	Title	Artist	Length
17.	"Simplify"	Christian Burns with Paul Harris & Vern	3:28
18.	"Paris is Calling"	Christian Burns with Antillas	3:09
Total length:			76:06

Deluxe Version
No.	Title	Artist	Length
19.	"Frozen Heart (Big Room Mix)"	Christian Burns with Marco V	3:15
20.	"As We Collide (Ørjan Nilsen Rermix)"	Christian Burns with Paul Oakenfold & JES	3:04
21.	"We Are Tonight (Walden Remix)"	Christian Burns with Paul van Dyk	3:12
22.	"Bullet (KhoMha Remix)"	Christian Burns with Stefan Dabruck	3:36
23.	"Perfectly (MaRLo Remix)"	Christian Burns with Maison & Dragen	3:44
24.	"The Enemy (Zetandel Chill Mix)"	Christian Burns with BT	4:06
25.	"Frozen Heart (Acoustic Version)"	Christian Burns with Marco V	4:43
26.	"We Are Tonight (Acoustic Version)"	Christian Burns with Paul van Dyk	4:02
