= A State of Trance 2013 =

Compilation album by Armin van Buuren
- Released: 14 February 2013
- Recorded: 2013
- Genres: Trance; progressive trance
- Length: 119:34
- Label: Armada
- Producer: Armin van Buuren

Armin van Buuren chronology
Universal Religion Chapter 6 (2012)	A State of Trance 2013 (2013)	Intense (2013)

Singles from A State of Trance 2013
- 1. "The Expedition" Released: 28 January 2013; 2. "Nehalennia" Released: 25 February 2013; 3. "D# Fat" Released: 25 February 2013

A State of Trance 2013 is the tenth compilation album in the A State of Trance compilation series mixed and compiled by Dutch DJ and record producer Armin van Buuren. It was released on 14 February 2013 by Armada Music.

== Track listing ==
Disc one: On the Beach
No.	Title	Artist	Length
1.	"Nehalennia"	Armin van Buuren vs. Arty	4:05
2.	"The Light"	Omnia	2:57
3.	"Skylarking"	BT	3:26
4.	"We Are"	Hazem Beltagui and Allan V.	3:34
5.	"Lullaby Lonely" (Progressive Mix Edit)	Denis Kenzo featuring Sveta B.	3:35
6.	"Made for You"	The Blizzard and Daniel van Sand featuring Julie Thompson	3:54
7.	"Dream State"	Two&One and Sarah Russell	3:37
8.	"Speed of Sound"	Aly & Fila featuring Tricia McTeague	3:56
9.	"Shelter Me"	Dart Rayne and Yura Moonlight and Cate Kanell	3:56
10.	"Lights"	Myon & Shane 54 with Aruna	3:17
11.	"Teardrops"	Super8 & Tab	3:12
12.	"Jalón"	VillaNaranjos	3:37
13.	"Eterna"	Matt Bukovski	4:10
14.	"Waiting for the Night" (Beat Service Remix Edit)	Armin van Buuren featuring Fiora	3:48
15.	"Laguna"	Protoculture	3:12
16.	"Jewel" (Pure Radio Edit)	Solarstone and Clare Stagg
Total length:			57:53

Disc two: In the Club
No.	Title	Artist	Length
1.	"Lost Language" (Intro Mix Edit)	Alexander Popov	4:32
2.	"D# Fat"	Armin van Buuren vs. W&W	3:15
3.	"The Expedition" (A State of Trance 600 Anthem)	Armin van Buuren vs. Markus Schulz	2:48
4.	"Dancing Sea" (AYDA Radio Edit)	Ana Criado and Adrian&Raz	4:16
5.	"New York City"	Alex M.O.R.P.H.	3:00
6.	"Caesar"	AYDA	5:18
7.	"Breathe"	John O'Callaghan and Full Tilt featuring Karen Kelly	3:39
8.	"Humming the Lights"	Armin van Buuren presents Gaia	3:34
9.	"Elements of Nature"	Rank 1 vs. M.I.K.E.	3:54
10.	"Musa"	Andrew Rayel	3:22
11.	"Grotesque"	RAM and Alex M.O.R.P.H.	3:36
12.	"Superfly"	Jorn van Deynhoven	3:23
13.	"BOOM"	MaRLo	3:22
14.	"The Killing" (Armin van Buuren Radio Edit)	Frans Bak	2:54
15.	"Game Over"	Heatbeat	4:01
16.	"Gunsmoke"	Bjorn Akesson	3:25
17.	"What It's Like" (Sneijder Radio Edit)	Andain	3:22
Total length:			1:01:41

== Charts ==
Chart (2013)	Peak position
Dutch Albums (Album Top 100)	2
Swiss Albums (Schweizer Hitparade)	16
US Top Dance Albums (Billboard)	11
