= Broken Tonight =

2009 single by Armin van Buuren

Single by Armin van Buuren featuring VanVelzen

from the album Hear Me Out
- Released: 26 October 2009
- Studio: Armada Studios, Amsterdam
- Genre: Uplifting trance
- Length: 2:58 (radio edit); 6:04 (extended mix)
- Label: Armind; Armada
- Songwriters: Carl Falk; Frederik Hult; Steven Lee; Didrik Thott
- Producers: Armin van Buuren; Benno de Goeij

Armin van Buuren singles chronology
"Never Say Never" (2009)	"Broken Tonight" (2009)	"Full Focus" (2010)

VanVelzen singles chronology
"Other Side of Me" (2009)	"Never Say Never" (2009)	"Take Me In" (2010)

"Broken Tonight" is a song by Dutch disc jockey and record producer Armin van Buuren. It features vocals and lyrics from Dutch singer and songwriter VanVelzen. The song was released in the Netherlands by Armind on 26 October 2009 as the second single from VanVelzen's third studio album Hear Me Out.

== Music video ==
A music video to accompany the release of "Broken Tonight" was first released onto YouTube on 17 December 2009. It was directed by Jelle Posthuma. The music video was shot in London. It shows the story of a depressive woman who gets back to live thanks to VanVelzen's spirit.

== Track listing ==
- Netherlands – Armind – digital download (ARMD1071)
1. "Broken Tonight" (extended mix) – 6:04
2. "Broken Tonight" (dub mix) – 6:03
- Netherlands – Armada – digital download & CD (ARMA229)
1. "Broken Tonight" (radio edit) – 2:58
2. "Broken Tonight" (original mix) – 6:04
3. "Broken Tonight" (dub mix) – 6:03
- Netherlands – Armind – digital download - remixes (ARMD1073)
1. "Broken Tonight" (Alex M.O.R.P.H. remix) – 9:07
2. "Broken Tonight" (Hardwell remix) – 7:02
3. "Broken Tonight" (Hardwell Dutch club mix) – 5:04

== Charts ==
Chart (2009–2010)	Peak position
Netherlands (Dutch Top 40)	33
Netherlands (Single Top 100)	63
US Dance/Mix Show Airplay (Billboard)	18
