= Orbion =

Single by Armin van Buuren

from the album Mirage
- Released: 13 February 2012
- Studio: Armada Studios, Amsterdam
- Genre: Uplifting trance
- Length: 2:47 (radio edit); 9:34 (extended version)
- Label: Armind; Armada
- Songwriter(s): Armin van Buuren; Benno de Goeij
- Producer(s): Armin van Buuren; Benno de Goeij

Armin van Buuren singles chronology
"Youtopia" (2011)	"Orbion" (2012)	"We Are Here to Make Some Noise" (2012)

"Orbion" is an instrumental composition by Dutch disc jockey and record producer Armin van Buuren. The track was released in the Netherlands by Armind as a digital download on 13 February 2012 as the seventh single from his fourth studio album Mirage.

== Reviews ==
According to the website "Trance History", the track "reflects [van Buuren's] true musical style in the choice of sounds and in the construction of a refrain always from dance floor".

== Music video ==
A music video to accompany the track was released to YouTube by Armada Music channel on 10 February 2012.

== Track listing ==
- Digital download (ARMD1115)
1. "Orbion" (radio edit) – 2:47
2. "Orbion" (extended version) – 9:34
3. "Orbion" (Max Graham vs. Protoculture remix) – 7:53
4. "Orbion" (Eco remix) – 7:28

== Charts ==
Chart (2012)	Peak position
Russia (Tophit)	197
