= Feels So Good (Armin van Buuren song) =

2011 song by Armin van Buuren

Single by Armin van Buuren featuring Nadia Ali

from the album Mirage
- Released: 20 June 2011
- Studio: Armada Studios, Amsterdam
- Genre: Vocal trance
- Length: 3:09 (Radio Edit); 6:26 (Armin van Buuren Club Mix)
- Label: Armind; Armada; Ultra
- Songwriter(s): Armin van Buuren; Benno de Goeij; Miriam Nervo; Olivia Nervo
- Producer(s): Armin van Buuren; Benno de Goeij

Armin van Buuren singles chronology
"Drowning" (2010)	"Feels So Good" (2011)	"Youtopia" (2011)

Nadia Ali singles chronology
"Pressure" (2011)	"Feels So Good" (2011)	"When It Rains" (2011)

"Feels So Good" is a song by Dutch disc jockey and producer Armin van Buuren. It features vocals from American singer and songwriter Nadia Ali. It was released on 20 June 2011 in the Netherlands by Armind as the fifth single from van Buuren's fourth studio album, Mirage.

== Music video ==
A music video to accompany the track was released to Armada Music's YouTube channel on 20 June 2011. It was shot in Hotel Des Indes, The Hague. It shows Armin van Buuren and Nadia Ali spying each other in the hotel.

== Track listing ==
Netherlands / US - Digital download - Armind (ARMD1094)

1. "Feels So Good" (Radio Edit) – 3:09
2. "Feels So Good" (Tristan Garner Remix) – 6:10
3. "Feels So Good" (Jochen Miller Remix) - 6:31
4. "Feels So Good" (Jerome Isma-ae Remix) - 7:16
5. "Feels So Good" (Armin van Buuren Club Mix) - 6:26

Netherlands - 12" - Armind (ARMD1094V)

1. "Feels So Good" (Tristan Garner Remix) – 6:10
2. "Feels So Good" (Jochen Miller Remix) – 6:31
3. "Feels So Good" (Jerome Isma-ae Remix) – 7:16
4. "Feels So Good" (Armin van Buuren Club Mix) – 6:26

== Charts ==
Chart (2011)	Peak position
Poland (Dance Top 50)	39
Russia (Tophit)	83
