= Intense (composition) =

Single by Armin van Buuren featuring Miri Ben-Ari

from the album Intense
- Released: November 22, 2013
- Studio: Armada Studios, Amsterdam
- Genre: Uplifting trance; classical; instrumental; dance-pop
- Length: 2:53 (radio edit); 8:48 (original mix)
- Label: Armind; Armada
- Songwriters: Armin van Buuren; Benno de Goeij; Miri Ben-Ari
- Producers: Armin van Buuren; Benno de Goeij; Miri Ben-Ari

Armin van Buuren singles chronology
"Beautiful Life" (2013)	"Intense" (2013)	"Save My Night" (2014)

Miri Ben-Ari singles chronology
"Symphony of Brotherhood" (2009)	"Intense" (2013)	"Quiet Storm" (2018)

"Intense" is a composition by Dutch DJ and record producer Armin van Buuren featuring Israeli-American violinist Miri Ben-Ari. The track was released only in the Netherlands by Armada Music as a digital download on 22 November 2013 as the fourth single from van Buuren's fifth studio album Intense (2013). The song was written by produced by van Buuren, Ben-Ari and Benno de Goeji.

Introducing the album, the track combines van Buuren's trance music with Ben-Ari's violin sound. It was chosen as "tune of year 2013" by the listeners of Armin van Buuren's radio A State of Trance.

== Track listing ==
- Digital download
1. "Intense" (radio edit) – 2:53
2. "Intense" (Dannic remix) – 5:52
3. "Intense" (Andrew Rayel remix) – 6:59

== Charts ==
Chart (2013–2014)	Peak position
Netherlands (Dutch Top 40)	12
Netherlands (Single Top 100)	14
