= Full Focus (composition) =

2010 song by Armin van Buuren

Single by Armin van Buuren

from the album Mirage
- Released: 24 June 2010
- Studio: Armada Studios, Amsterdam
- Genre: Progressive trance
- Length: 4:22; 6:49 (extended mix)
- Label: Armind; Armada; Ultra
- Songwriters: Armin van Buuren; Benno de Goeij
- Producers: Armin van Buuren; Benno de Goeij

Armin van Buuren singles chronology
| "Broken Tonight" (2009) | "Full Focus" (2010) | "Not Giving Up on Love" (2010) |

"Full Focus" is an instrumental composition by Dutch disc jockey and producer Armin van Buuren. It was released on 24 June 2010 in the Netherlands as the first single from van Buuren's fourth studio album, Mirage.

== Music video ==
The music video was released to Armada Music's YouTube channel on 23 June 2010. It is a live recording from A State of Trance 450 festival.

== Track listing ==
Digital download

1. "Full Focus" – 4:22

Digital download / 12" (ARMD1076 / UL2523)

1. "Full Focus" (extended mix) – 6:49
2. "Full Focus" (Ummet Ozcan remix) – 7:03
3. "Full Focus" (Joint Operations Centre remix) – 7:42
4. "Full Focus" (Ali Wilson TEKELEC remix) – 7:09

CD (ARMA264)

1. "Full Focus" (radio version) – 2:46
2. "Full Focus" (extended mix) – 6:49
3. "Full Focus" (Ummet Ozcan remix) – 7:03
4. "Full Focus" (Joint Operations Centre remix) – 7:42
5. "Full Focus" (Ali Wilson TEKELEC remix) – 7:09

== Charts ==
| Chart (2010) | Peak position |
|---|---|
| Netherlands (Dutch Top 40) | 28 |
| Netherlands (Single Top 100) | 34 |
