= Waiting for the Night (Armin van Buuren song) =

2013 song by Armin van Buuren

Single by Armin van Buuren featuring Fiora

from the album Intense
- Released: 21 January 2013
- Recorded: 2012
- Studio: Armada Studios, Amsterdam
- Genre: Progressive trance
- Length: 3:04
- Label: Armind; Armada
- Songwriters: Armin van Buuren; Benno de Goeij; Fiora Cutler
- Producers: Armin van Buuren; Benno de Goeij

Armin van Buuren singles chronology
"I'll Listen" (2012)	"Waiting for the Night" (2013)	"The Expedition" (2013)

Fiora singles chronology
"Damaged" (2012)	"Waiting for the Night" (2013)	"58BPM" (2013)

"Waiting for the Night" is a song by Dutch DJ and record producer Armin van Buuren. It features vocals and lyrics from Australian singer and songwriter Fiora. The song was released in the Netherlands by Armind as a digital download on 21 January 2013. It was chosen as the main theme song to the Dutch movie Loving Ibiza (Verliefd op Ibiza). It is the first single from van Buuren's fifth album Intense.

== Music video ==
A music video to accompany the track was released to YouTube on 29 January 2013. It contains scenes taken from the movie Loving Ibiza, starring Armin van Buuren mixing in a Ibiza club.

== Track listing ==
- Digital download (ARMD1140)
1. "Waiting for the Night" (radio edit) – 3:04
2. "Waiting for the Night" (extended mix) – 4:29
3. "Waiting for the Night" (Beat Service remix) - 7:28
4. "Waiting for the Night" (Beat Service remix edit) - 3:48
5. "Waiting for the Night" (Beat Service dub) - 6:27
6. "Waiting for the Night" (Clinton VanSciver extended mix) - 4:33
7. "Waiting for the Night" (Clinton VanSciver radio edit) - 2:57

== Charts ==
Chart (2013)	Peak position
Netherlands (Dutch Top 40)	23
Netherlands (Single Top 100)	30
