= I Need You (Armin van Buuren & Garibay song) =

2017 song by Armin van Buuren and Garibay

Single by Armin van Buuren and Garibay featuring Olaf Blackwood

from the album The Best of Armin Only and Balance
- Released: 6 January 2017
- Genre: Dance-pop; electropop; tropical house (radio version); progressive trance (club mix)
- Length: 3:26 (radio version); 5:30 (extended club mix)
- Label: Armada Music
- Songwriters: Armin van Buuren; Benno de Goeij; Fernando Garibay; Olaf Blackwood
- Producers: Armin van Buuren; Benno de Goeij; Garibay

Armin van Buuren singles chronology
| "Great Spirit" (2016) | "I Need You" (2017) | "Sunny Days" (2017) |

Garibay singles chronology
| "Your Body" (2015) | "I Need You" (2017) | "Last Summer" (2018) |

Olaf Blackwood singles chronology
| "Can't Lie" (2016) | "I Need You" (2017) | "Keep on Calling" (2019) |

Music video
- "I Need You" on YouTube

"I Need You" is a song by Dutch DJ and record producer Armin van Buuren and American record producer Garibay, featuring vocals from Jamaican singer-songwriter Olaf Blackwood. It was released on 6 January 2017 through Armada Music. The song later appeared on van Buuren's compilation album The Best of Armin Only and his seventh studio album, Balance.

== Background and composition ==
"I Need You" was announced as a collaboration between van Buuren and Garibay, with Blackwood providing vocals. Billboard described Garibay in connection with the release as a songwriter known for his work with Lady Gaga, while the song itself was presented as a new single by van Buuren and Garibay. According to The Nocturnal Times, the track represented a different side of van Buuren's production style and was released through his Armada Music label at the beginning of 2017.

The original version is a piano-led vocal production with tropical influences. Nexus Radio wrote that the single begins with subtle piano riffs and Blackwood's vocals before moving into a livelier chorus, while also noting the song's tropical undertones. The Nocturnal Times similarly described the song as a piano-driven vocal production and said that it showed van Buuren's softer side.

Van Buuren said of the collaboration: "It's been truly inspiring to work with Fernando Garibay and Olaf Blackwood and to come up with something so musically adventurous. I am very proud of the result and can't wait to hear what everyone thinks of 'I Need You'."

== Critical reception ==
Writing for The Nocturnal Times, Mark Mancino said that "I Need You" showcased "another side" of van Buuren's capabilities and described the track as uplifting, emotional and different from what listeners might usually expect from him. Maria Rodrigues of Nexus Radio called the collaboration "poetic and passionate", highlighting Blackwood's vocal contribution, the piano introduction and the song's tropical undertones.

In a 2019 feature about tracks from Balance, Armada Music described "I Need You" as van Buuren's first pop-like single to emerge, stating that the collaboration with Garibay and Blackwood reflected his willingness to explore his musical boundaries.

== Music video ==
The official music video for "I Need You" was released in January 2017. According to A State of Trance, the video was shot in Los Angeles and used striking imagery together with a humorous take on the superstar lifestyle. Nexus Radio also reported that the music video was shot in L.A. and was planned for release one week after the single. The video was directed and edited by Matt Alonzo.

== Track listing ==
Digital download
| No. | Title | Length |
|---|---|---|
| 1. | "I Need You" (featuring Olaf Blackwood) | 3:26 |

Digital download – club mix
| No. | Title | Length |
|---|---|---|
| 1. | "I Need You" (club mix; featuring Olaf Blackwood) | 3:17 |
| 2. | "I Need You" (extended club mix; featuring Olaf Blackwood) | 5:30 |

Digital download – remixes
| No. | Title | Length |
|---|---|---|
| 1. | "I Need You" (Andrew Rayel remix) | 3:28 |
| 2. | "I Need You" (DubVision remix) | 3:15 |
| 3. | "I Need You" (Filatov & Karas remix) | 3:08 |
| 4. | "I Need You" (ANGEMI remix) | 3:58 |
| 5. | "I Need You" (Mokita remix) | 3:29 |
| 6. | "I Need You" (Galactic Marvl remix) | 3:48 |
| 7. | "I Need You" (Standerwick remix) | 3:30 |
| 8. | "I Need You" (Andrew Rayel extended remix) | 5:38 |
| 9. | "I Need You" (DubVision extended remix) | 5:13 |
| 10. | "I Need You" (Filatov & Karas extended remix) | 4:50 |
| 11. | "I Need You" (ANGEMI extended remix) | 5:00 |
| 12. | "I Need You" (Galactic Marvl extended remix) | 4:30 |
| 13. | "I Need You" (Standerwick extended remix) | 5:15 |
| 14. | "I Need You" | 3:27 |

== Charts ==
| Chart (2017) | Peak position |
|---|---|
| Austria (Ö3 Austria Top 40) | 54 |
| Netherlands (Dutch Top 40) | 13 |
| Netherlands (Single Top 100) | 31 |

== Certifications ==
Certifications for "I Need You"
| Region | Certification | Certified units/sales |
|---|---|---|
| Netherlands (NVPI) | Platinum | 40,000^{‡} |
^{*} Sales figures based on certification alone.^{^} Shipments figures based on certification alone.^{‡} Sales+streaming figures based on certification alone.

== Release history ==
| Region | Date | Format | Version | Label | Ref. |
|---|---|---|---|---|---|
| Various | 6 January 2017 | Digital download | Original version | Armada Music | |
| Various | 13 January 2017 | Digital download | Club mix | Armind | |
| Various | 13 January 2017 | Digital download | Remixes | Armada Music | |
