= Universal Religion Chapter 6 =

Compilation album by Armin van Buuren
- Released: 14 September 2012
- Recorded: August 2012
- Genres: Trance; progressive trance; progressive house
- Length: Part 1: 78:07; Part 2: 77:08
- Label: Armada

Armin van Buuren chronology
A State of Trance 2012 (2011)	Universal Religion Chapter 6 (2012)	A State of Trance 2013 (2013)

Singles from Universal Religion Chapter 6
- 1. "I'll Listen" Released: 10 September 2012

Universal Religion Chapter 6 is the sixth compilation album in the Universal Religion compilation series mixed and compiled by Dutch DJ and record producer Armin van Buuren. It was released on 14 September 2012 by Armada Music.

== Track listing ==
Live Continuous Mix Part 1
No.	Title	Artist	Length
1.	"How Do I Know" (Armin van Buuren Intro Edit)	Andrew Rayel featuring Jano	6:06
2.	"I Want To Believe" (Original Mix)	Andy Duguid featuring Shannon Hurley	7:13
3.	"Barbados" (Radio Edit)	Blake Jarrell	3:57
4.	"Fireisland" (Future Disciple Remix)	Solarstone with Aly & Fila	8:44
5.	"I'll Listen" (Radio Edit)	Armin van Buuren featuring Ana Criado	3:36
6.	"Relict" (Radio Edit)	Abstract Vision and Elite Electronic vs. Broning	4:25
7.	"Perpetual Motion" (Radio Edit)	Protoculture	3:56
8.	"Burana" (Radio Edit)	Ørjan Nilsen	2:33
9.	"Fortuna" (Radio Edit)	Beat Service	3:48
10.	"Aeon of Revenge" (Radio Edit)	Andrew Rayel	3:47
11.	"What's Wrong" (Skytech Stadium Radio Edit)	Skytech	3:41
12.	"Green Velvet" (Radio Edit)	Stoneface & Terminal	3:47
13.	"Premonition" (Original Mix)	A.R.D.I.	7:06
14.	"Believe In Me" (Radio Edit)	Matt Davey	3:51
15.	"Headliner" (Radio Edit)	Jorn van Deynhoven	3:27
16.	"Void" (Original Mix (Mashed up with Status Excessu D))	Sasha Carassi and Mikael Jonasson	9:06
17.	"Status Excessu D [The Official A State of Trance 500 Anthem]" (Radio Edit (Mashed up with Void))	Armin van Buuren presents Gaia	2:59
18.	"Universal Religion Chapter 6" (Live Continuous Mix, Pt. 1)	Armin van Buuren	78:07
Total length:			78:07

Live Continuous Mix Part 2
No.	Title	Artist	Length
19.	"Eternal Flame" (Original Breaks Mix)	Alex M.O.R.P.H.	4:29
20.	"Infina" (Radio Edit)	Omnia	3:50
21.	"Full Disclosure" (Original Mix)	Richard Sebastian	7:31
22.	"Stranger" (Kyau & Albert Remix Edit)	Jaytech featuring Steve Smith	3:19
23.	"Metamorphose" (Radio Edit)	Juventa	3:34
24.	"Elveda" (Radio Edit)	Faruk Sabanci	3:45
25.	"3 Strikes UR In" (Radio Edit)	Daniel Kandi	3:47
26.	"Like Spinning Plates" (Alexander Popov Remix Edit)	Dash Berlin featuring Emma Hewitt	3:07
27.	"Time" (MaRLo Dub Radio Edit)	Paul Webster featuring Angelic Amanda	2:41
28.	"The Witch" (Radio Edit)	Tomas Heredia	4:07
29.	"K Ta" (Edit)	Andy Moor	4:17
30.	"Pleasure" (Original Mix)	Richard Durand and Protoculture	7:13
31.	"Retrospection" (Radio Edit)	Matt Bukovski	3:31
32.	"The Perfect Match" (Radio Edit)	Aligator featuring Daniel Kandi	3:44
33.	"Understatement" (Original Mix (Mashed up with Try To Be Love))	Mark Burton	8:06
34.	"Try To Be Love" (Radio Edit (Mashed up with Understatement))	Sunlounger and Zara Taylor	3:54
35.	"The Inside" (Radio Edit)	Neptune Project featuring Polly Strange	3:41
36.	"Universal Religion Chapter 6" (Live Continuous Mix, Pt. 2)	Armin van Buuren	77:08
Total length:			77:08
