= Great Spirit (song) =

Single by Armin van Buuren vs. Vini Vici featuring Hilight Tribe

from the album The Best of Armin Only
- Released: 12 December 2016
- Recorded: Armada Studios, Amsterdam
- Genre: Psychedelic trance
- Length: 3:36
- Label: Armind; Armada
- Songwriters: Armin van Buuren; Matan Kadosh; Aviram Saharai; Laurent Didier; Mathias Duroy; Sébastien Garcia; Ludovic Pélissier; Grégory Ruzé; Suzanne Landau
- Producers: Armin van Buuren; Vini Vici

Armin van Buuren singles chronology
"Make It Right" (2016)	"Great Spirit" (2016)	"I Need You" (2017)

Vini Vici singles chronology
"Colors" (2016)	"Great Spirit" (2016)	"Fkd Up Kids" (2017)

Hilight Tribe singles chronology
"Free Tibet" (2016)	"Great Spirit" (2016)	"Moyoni" (2019)

"Great Spirit" is a song by Dutch disc jockey and producer Armin van Buuren in collaboration with Israeli producers duo Vini Vici. It features vocals from the French band Hilight Tribe. It is the first psy trance song by Armin van Buuren. The track was released in the Netherlands by Armin as a digital download on 12 December 2016. The song is included in van Buuren's compilation album The Best of Armin Only.

== Background and release ==
Armin van Buuren declared about the song: “I’ve wanted to work with Vini Vici ever since they embarked on the music scene. Few acts have such a well-defined signature sound and I am really pleased with how ‘Great Spirit’ turned out. I’ve been playing this tune in my live sets since Amsterdam Music Festival and they will be thrilled to know that it's finally been released.”

Vini Vici declared about the song: “We believe that hard work, determination and passion can make every dream come true. But this is more than that. We could have never guessed that we’d collaborate with Armin van Buuren and it lly gone beyond our wildest dreams! We are really happy with the results!”

== Reception ==
According to Wackii from French webmedia Guettapen, "this collaboration is in the mood of the times and takes back all the codes of galloping psy and tribal vocals. [...] Armin's style is not found on this track but he shows one more time his amazing versatility! Nevertheless it is regrettable that the track doesn't really innovate and doesn't really represent a fusion of the styles…"

== Track listing ==
- Netherlands Digital download (ARMD1325)
1. "Great Spirit" – 7:37
- Netherlands Digital download (ARMD1325B)
1. "Great Spirit" - 3:36
2. "Great Spirit" (Extended Mix) - 7:37
- Netherlands Digital download Wildstylez Remix (ARMD1325R)
1. "Great Spirit" (Wildstylez Extended Remix) – 4:49

== Certifications ==
Certifications for "Great Spirit"
Region	Certification	Certified units/sales
Denmark (IFPI Danmark)	Gold	45,000^{‡}
France (SNEP)	Gold	100,000^{‡}
Germany (BVMI)	Gold	200,000^{‡}
Netherlands (NVPI)	Gold	20,000^{‡}
Streaming
Sweden (GLF)	Platinum	8,000,000^{†}
^{‡} Sales+streaming figures based on certification alone.^{†} Streaming-only figures based on certification alone.
