= D♯ Fat =

Single by Armin van Buuren, W&W

from the album A State of Trance 2013
- Released: 25 February 2013
- Studio: Armada Studios, Amsterdam
- Genre: Big room trance
- Length: 3:15 (Radio Edit); 5:28 (Original Mix)
- Label: Armind; Armada
- Songwriters: Armin van Buuren; Benno de Goeij; Willem van Hanegem; Wardt van der Harst
- Producers: Armin van Buuren; Benno de Goeij; W&W

Armin van Buuren singles chronology
"The Expedition" (2013)	"D♯ Fat" (2013)	"This Is What It Feels Like" (2013)

W&W singles chronology
"The Code" (2013)	"D♯ Fat" (2013)	"Jumper" (2013)

"D♯ Fat" is an instrumental composition by Dutch DJs and record producers Armin van Buuren and W&W. The song was released in the Netherlands by Armind as a digital download on 25 February 2013 as the third single from van Buuren's compilation A State of Trance 2013.

== Reception ==
Tyler Almodovar from the webmedia Rave Rafting has been deceived by the track which he gave a negative review, declaring that "‘D♯ Fat’ brings out AvB's and W&W’s dark side, the opening leaves me thinking beautiful while the drops finds my jaw on the floor." According to another webmedia, "EDM Canada", the track is the turning point in van Buuren's musical career : "'D♯ Fat' [is] a signal of the beginning of a style change for trance legend Armin van Buuren" where he incorporates house elements in his trance sound.

== Music video ==
A music video to accompany the release of "D♯ Fat" was first released onto YouTube on 17 September 2013. The music video was shot in New York City.

== Track listing ==
- Digital download (ARMD1143)
1. "D♯ Fat" – 5:28
- Digital download (ARMD1143A)
1. "D♯ Fat" (Radio Edit) – 3:15
2. "D♯ Fat" (Original Mix) – 5:28

== Charts ==
Chart (2013)	Peak position
Russia (Tophit)	206
