= Youtopia =

Single by Armin van Buuren featuring Adam Young

from the album Mirage
- Released: 28 November 2011
- Recorded: 2010–11
- Studio: Armada Studios, Amsterdam
- Genre: Electropop
- Length: 3:59
- Label: Armind; Armada; Ultra
- Songwriters: Armin van Buuren; Benno de Goeij; Adam Young
- Producers: van Buuren; de Goeij

Armin van Buuren singles chronology
"Feels So Good" (2011)	"Youtopia" (2011)	"Orbion" (2012)

Adam Young singles chronology
"Angels" (2011)	"Youtopia" (2011)	"Shooting Star" (2012)

Music video
- "Youtopia" on YouTube

"Youtopia" is a song by Dutch DJ and record producer Armin van Buuren. It features the vocals from American singer Adam Young, who is also the founder of electronica project Owl City. This song was released in the Netherlands by his label Armind as a digital download on 28 November 2011 and as a CD on 13 December 2011. It was released as the sixth single from his fourth studio album Mirage. The song was written by Benno de Goeij, Armin van Buuren and Adam Young.

== Composition and recording ==
"Youtopia" was written by Armin van Buuren, Benno de Goeij and Adam Young, while production was handled by van Buuren and de Goeij. It was recorded at Armada Studios in Amsterdam, and was mastered by Emily Lazar and Joe LaPorta at The Lodge in New York.

Upon working together, Young cited van Buuren as an inspiration to his music, which van Buuren was "flattered" by. He spoke with MTV about how the song came together, stating that he sent Young an email, noting how much he appreciated his music. They began communicating and the song was created through exchanges over the internet. Van Buuren described the track as "simple yet effective" and a "beautiful, sweet little song."

Four remixes to the song were created and were done by Blake Jarrell, Tocadisco, Michael Woods and ReLocate. Judge Jules featured the song on his DJ set at the Creamfields festival in 2011.

== Critical reception ==
"Youtopia" was met with generally positive reviews. We Rave You described the track as one of the "most unforgettable" songs on Mirage and stated, "its catchy synths and melodies coinciding with Young's charming vocals, this track is quite a delight to hear from beginning to end." News24 said of the song, "it flows as one epic journey rather than 16 separate party starters."

== Chart performance ==
The song debuted at number 88 on the Dutch Single Top 100 chart, before peaking at number 68. The song also reached the Dutch Top 40, peaking at number 27. It entered the Dutch Dance Top 30 at number 19, before peaking at number 14. The song reached number 87 on the Ultratip Bubbling Under Flanders chart.

== Music video ==
The music video to accompany the release of "Youtopia" was first released onto YouTube on 28 November 2011, through the label of Armada Music. The video also features Adam Young.

== Track listing ==
CD single
No.	Title	Length
1.	"Youtopia" (radio edit)	2:52

Digital download
No.	Title	Length
1.	"Youtopia"	3:59
2.	"Youtopia" (Blake Jarrell remix)	6:09
3.	"Youtopia" (Tocadisco remix)	6:19
4.	"Youtopia" (Michael Woods remix)	7:29
5.	"Youtopia" (ReLocate remix)	8:18

Unreleased version
No.	Title	Length
1.	"Youtopia" (original mix)	5:29

== Personnel ==
Credits for "Youtopia" adapted from album's liner notes.

Musicians

- Armin van Buuren – programming, composer, lyricist, producer
- Adam Young – vocals, composer, lyricist

Production

- Benno de Goeij – composer, lyricist, producer, programming
- Emily Lazar – mastering
- Joe LaPorta – mastering

== Charts ==
=== Weekly charts ===
Weekly chart performance for "Youtopia"
Chart (2011–12)	Peak position
Belgium (Ultratip Bubbling Under Flanders)	87
CIS Airplay (TopHit)	107
Netherlands (Dutch Top 40)	27
Netherlands (Single Top 100)	68
Ukraine Airplay (TopHit)	36

=== Year-end charts ===
Year-end chart performance for "Youtopia"
Chart (2011)	Position
Netherlands (Dutch Top 40)	182
Chart (2012)	Position
Netherlands (Dutch Top 40)	178

== Release history ==
Release history for "Youtopia"
Region	Date	Format	Label	Ref.
Various	28 November 2011	Digital download	Armada	
Netherlands	28 November 2011	CD	Armada	
United States	13 December 2011	CD	Ultra	
