= Benno de Goeij =

- Also known as: Benno; Benicio; Dutch Force; Hidden Sound System; The Quest; San; Secilia
- Born: Marinus Bernardus de Goeij; 19 March 1975 (age 51); Oud-Beijerland, South Holland, Netherlands
- Genres: Trance; progressive trance
- Occupations: Disc jockey; record producer
- Years active: 1996–present
- Labels: High Contrast; Armind; In Trance We Trust; Karma

Marinus Bernardus "Benno" de Goeij (Dutch pronunciation: [ˈbɛnoː də ˈɣui]; born on 19 March 1975) is a Dutch trance music producer. He is best known for his participation in Rank 1 with Piet Bervoets, Kamaya Painters with Tiësto and Gaia with Armin van Buuren whilst also serving as the co-producer for the hits that gave Jochen Miller his early fame between 2008 - 2012. From 2008 to 2023, de Goeij worked together with Armin van Buuren as his co-producer.

== History ==
=== Early years (1997–1998) ===
Benno de Goeij began working as a producer in 1997 alongside Piet Bervoets whom he met at a party. They decided to create music of their own and created the duo Pedro & Benno with singles "Scream for Love", "Talkin' to You", and "Speechless" released under Karma Records. They also created tracks under various aliases like Precious People, Gualagara, A.I.D.A., Simplistic Mind, Two Disciples, R.O.O.S.

=== Rank 1: the early years (1999 – 2003) ===
In 1999, Rank 1 was born as they thought it would be a perfect joke to see a group named Rank 1 at a number 1 position. This joke became real when "Airwave" hit numerous charts at that position. They also remixed Cygnus X's "Superstring" song and released an anthem for Sensation in 2001 known as "Such Is Life" from the album Symsonic. In 2003, they re-released "Breathing" which was another charting track since it was a more break beat version of "Airwave". In 1998, Tiësto and de Goeij created Kamaya Painters, with three successful singles.

=== Rank 1: The later years (2004 – 2013) ===
Following their successes with the Dutch Anthem Trance sound, Benno and Piet decided to take Rank 1 in a new direction sound-wise. This resulted in various hits with varying style-influences such as the Tech Trance anthem "Beats At Rank-1 Dotcom" (2004) which was picked as the Anthem for Trance Energy 2005; the highly industrial/mechanical Techno-Trance hybrid "Top Gear" (2005) which was initially not supposed to be released following its debut during their Rank 1 live performance at Trance Energy 2005; the Electro-House inspired "Life Less Ordinary" (2006) collaboration with Alex M.O.R.P.H.; The modern Bigroom Trance Anthems "L.E.D. There Be Light" (2008), "Symfo" (2009), and "The Great Escape" vs. Jochen Miller (2010) which were chosen as the Trance Energy Anthem 2009, Sunrise Festival Theme 2009 and EnTrance Theme 2010 respectively. After years of exotic experimentation, Benno and Piet decided to re-invent their melodic/hypnotic Trance roots by releasing deeper Trance journeys in the guise of "7 Instead Of 8" (2012), "Elements Of Nature" vs. M.I.K.E. Push (2013) and "13.11.11" (2013) between October 2012 and November 2013.

Benno spent a few years in this era touring alongside Piet for their infamous Rank 1 live performances, touching down at Trance Energy 2005, Armin Only 2006, Essence Festival 2008, Trance Energy 2009, Sunrise Festival 2009, EDC Las Vegas 2012, Nature One 2012, Sunrise Festival 2012 and Back In The House 2013 among many more. The Rank 1 project continued to be active post-2013 albeit on a far lower frequency than before. Benno still managed to join Piet on stage for two very special Rank 1 live performances at Dreamstate SoCal 2017 and ASOT 950 in 2020.

=== Rank 1 Side-projects: co-producing for High Contrast label mates (2004–2013) ===
In 2005 Benno co-produced the two-sided JOOP EP called "The World / Another World". Then, from 2006 to 2008 he co-created four of Ronald van Gelderen's singles: "This Way" (2006), "Realize" (2006), "Dirty Rocker" (2007) and "Embrace Me" (2008). This Way and Embrace Me even received Rank 1 Remixes. In 2010 Benno co-produced Artento Divini's single "Griffin" which was chosen as the Pleasure Island 2010 Theme.

Following the release of the Rank 1 vs. Jochen Miller dancefloor hit "And Then..." in 2008, Benno began working as Jochen's co-producer on the majority of the latter's big singles and remixes from 2008 through to early 2012. These included: "Lost Connection" (2008), "9 Minutes / Eclipse" (2008), "Face Value" (2009), "Brace Yourself" (2009), "Red One" (2009), "The Great Escape" (2010), "Dark Heart Waiting (Jochen Miller Remix)" (2010), "Humanoid" (2010), "Feels So Good (Jochen Miller Remix)" (2010), "Classified (Energy 2011 Theme)" (2010), "uPad" (2010), "Cosmic Gate - Back To Earth (Jochen Miller Remix)" (2010), "U And Eye" (2011), "Troucid" (2011), "One Day" (2011), "Bamm!" (2011), "Flashback" (2011), "Wild And Perfect Day" feat. Sarah Bettens (2012) and "Leap Of Faith (Emporium Festival Theme 2012)" (2012). Following Emporium, the two of them went their separate ways and a couple of years later, Jochen Miller swapped High Contrast Recordings for Armada Music.

=== Becoming Armin van Buuren's studio partner (2008 - 2023) ===
In 2006, Benno teamed up with Armin van Buuren for the very first time. For this initial collab, help was enlisted by Sacha Collisson, Zoe Durrant and Pete Kirtley aka Kush for "This World Is Wathching Me". In the A State Of Trance FOREVER Podcast episode, Benno and Armin explain that this collaboration was the hardest they did because they still had to get used to each other. Furthermore, according to Armin, Benno disliked the original chorus they had written so they used the bridge/verses instead.

But once it was finished, This World Is Watching Me became a hit and Benno and Armin worked together on Armin van Buuren's album Imagine. Benno co-produced the tracks "Going Wrong" feat. DJ Shah & Chris Jones, "Unforgivable" feat. Jaren, "Face To Face", "Hold On To Me" feat. Audrey Gallagher, the mega-hit "In And Out Of Love" feat. Sharon Den Adel, "Never Say Never" feat. Krezip's Jacqueline Govaert, "Rain" feat. Cathy Burton and "What If" feat. Vera Ostrova.

In 2010, he co-wrote and co-produced all tracks on Mirage except for "Minack" which Armin made with Ferry Corsten.

In 2013, Benno co-wrote all 15 tracks on Armin's album Intense.

On 2015's Embrace, Benno contributed co-wrote "Embrace" (Armin Only 2015 Theme) feat. Eric Vloeimans, "Another You" feat. Mr. Probz, "Strong Ones" feat. Cimo Frankel, "Make It Right" feat. Angel Taylor, "Face Of Summer" feat. Sarah deCourcy, "Heading Up High" feat. Kensington, "Gotta Be Love" feat. Lyrica Anderson, "Hands To Heaven" feat. Rock Mafia, "Caught In The Slipstream" feat. BullySongs, "Embargo" feat. Cosmic Gate, "Freefall" feat. BullySongs, "Indestructible" feat. DBX, "Old Skool" and "Off The Hook" feat. Hardwell.

In 2019, he helped Armin on his album Balance. He co-produced the tracks "Such For Love" feat. Avalan, "Something Real" feat. Avaian Grays and Jordan Shaw, "Wild Wild Son" feat. Sam Martin, "Phone Down" feat. Garibay, "Sunny Days" feat. Josh Cumbee, "Runaway" feat. Candace Sosa, "It Could Be" vs. Inner City, "Unlove You" feat. Ne-Yo, "Therapy" feat. James Newman, "Waking Up With You" feat. David Hodges, "Don't Let Me Go" feat. Matluck, "Million Voices", "Show Me Love" with Above & Beyond, "Song I Sing" feat. Haliene, "High On Your Love" feat. James Newman, "I Need You" feat. Garibay & Olaf Blackwood, "Lonely For You" feat. Bonnie McKee, "Always" feat. BT & Nation Of One, "All Comes Down" feat. Cimo Frankel, "Miles Away" feat. Sam Martin and "Stickup".

In 2021, Benno was part of every track on Armin's A State Of Trance Forever album.

=== Taking Gaia on tour (2014–2019) ===
He and Armin have also co-produced songs under the alias Gaia; at the 2014 Ultra Music Festival, the two producers performed for the first time as a group as part of the A State of Trance 650: New Horizons show on the final day of the festival.

In October 2018, they performed live for the very first time at the Paradiso in Amsterdam. As explained in this interview, they later went back in the studio with the live hooks, loops and snippets to craft the first (and to date only) Gaia album called "Moons Of Jupiter" which was released in June 2019. The album could also be experienced as one continuous DJ mix on Beatport.

=== Parting ways with Armin van Buuren (2024) ===
Armin van Buuren and Benno de Goeij parted ways somewhere between 2023 and 2024, as Benno hasn't been featured in the credits of any of the Armin van Buuren singles released after "Es Vedra" (2024), these singles being:

- "Gimme The Love" (with Seth Hills & Alessia Labate) - Released: 2025-05-23
- "Bach To The Future" (with BLR) - Released: 2025-05-09
- "Dream A Little Dream" (with Sam Gray) - Released: 2025-04-25
- "Sound Of You" (with Rob Swire & Pendulum) - Released: 2025-03-27
- "Angels" (Extended) / (VIP Mix) (with Punctual & EVALINA) - Released: 2025-03-20 / 2025-03-13
- "Keep The Faith" (with Bon Jovi) - Released: 2025-02-28
- "All Night" (with John Cristian) - Released: 2025-01-30
- "Love" (with Omnia) - Released: 2025-01-17
- "Viva L’Opera" (with Natalia Gioia) - Released: 2024-12-13
- "Extreme Ways" (with Moby) - Released: 2024-11-22
- "Late Checkout" (with W&W) - Released: 2024-11-08
- "Freedom" (with Oliver Heldens & Sam Harper) - Released: 2024-10-25
- "Racing Spirit" - Released: 2024-10-11
- "ALIVE" - Released: 2025-06-27
- "Sarabande" (with Vini Vici and Ana Timopei) - Released: 2024-10-04
- "Pulstar" - Released: 2024-09-27
- "Part Of Me" (with Louis III) - Released: 2024-09-20
- "Follow The Light" (with Hardwell) - Released: 2024-09-06
- "Love Is Eternity" (with Agents Of Time feat. ORKID) - Released: 2024-08-30
- "Let Me Show You" (With Camisra) - Released: 2024-08-23

As of 2025, the reasons for this split remain unknown.

=== Present day: return as Rank 1 and new BnO alias (2024-) ===
In September 2024, Benno released a brand new solo alias (his first since the early '00s) called "BnO". On X (formerly Twitter) Benno announced the project with the following quote:

"I've been pretty silent for the last year, and been exploring new directions. One of these resulted in the track Take Me Away with @lulleauxmusic and @semrozendaal under my new alias BnO (@whois_bno). Do you like this late summer vibe?"

Two tracks have been released so far, these being "Take Me Away" (2024) and "Before You Love Me" (2025) alongside Lulleaux. The former even received a Rank 1 Remix, the first Rank 1 Remix since "Sunrise" (2022).

2025 saw Benno return as Rank 1 with the release of "Strobo", the first Rank 1 solo single since "Superstring" (2016): it also saw the return of the classic "alternative" Rank 1 mix with the Deeper Dub Mix. A potential third BnO single and Lulleaux collaboration was teased in May 2025; based on the tags Benno used in his post, it seems this new track will be called "Moment With You".

== Discography ==
=== Singles ===
As Rank 1

Singles

- 1999 Rank 1 – "Black Snow / The Citrus Juicer"
- 1999 Rank 1 – "Airwave (Innercity Theme 1999)"
- 2001 Rank 1 feat. Shanokee – "Such Is Life (Sensation Anthem 2001)"
- 2002 Rank 1 – "Awakening"
- 2003 Rank 1 – "Breathing (Airwave 2003)"
- 2003 Rank 1 feat. Shanokee – "It's Up to You (Symsonic)"
- 2004 Rank 1 – "Unreleased Tracks from the Album Symsonic: Conspiracy / Cosmomatic / Down from the Deep"
- 2004 Rank 1 – "Beats at Rank-1 Dotcom (Trance Energy Anthem 2005) / After Me"
- 2005 Rank 1 – "Opus 17 / Top Gear"
- 2007 Armin van Buuren vs. Rank 1 feat. Kush – "This World Is Watching Me"
- 2007 Alex M.O.R.P.H. vs. Rank 1 – "Life Less Ordinary"
- 2008 Rank 1 vs. Jochen Miller – "And Then..."
- 2009 Rank 1 – "L.E.D. There Be Light (Trance Energy Anthem 2009)"
- 2009 Rank 1 – "Symfo (Sunrise Festival Theme 2009)"
- 2010 Rank 1 vs. Jochen Miller – "The Great Escape (enTrance Theme 2010)"
- 2010 Nic Chagall, Rank 1 & Wippenberg – "100"
- 2012 Rank 1 & Jochen Miller feat. Sarah Bettens – "Wild and Perfect Day"
- 2012 Cerf, Mitiska & Jaren with Rank 1 – "Witness"
- 2012 Rank 1 – "7 Instead of 8"
- 2013 Rank 1 vs. M.I.K.E. – "Elements of Nature"
- 2013 Rank 1 – "Floorlifter"
- 2013 Rank 1 – "13.11.11"
- 2014 Rank 1 & Dennis Sheperd – "Freudenrausch"
- 2014 Rank 1 – "Airwave (21st Century Mix)"
- 2015 Rank 1 vs. M.I.K.E. Push – "Juno"
- 2015 Rank 1 vs M.I.K.E. Push – "Zenith"
- 2016 Rank 1 – "Superstring"
- 2016 York & Rank 1 feat. Lola – "This World Is So Amazing"
- 2019 Marco V & Rank 1 – "We Finally Met"
- 2021 Armin van Buuren & Rank 1 - "The Greater Light To Rule The Night"
- 2023 Armin van Buuren, Ferry Corsten, Rank 1 & Ruben de Ronde - "Destination (A State Of Trance 2024 Anthem)"
- 2025 Rank 1 - "Strobo"
- 2025 Rank 1 - "Lytherion"

Albums

- 2002 Rank 1 – Symsonic inc. Symsonic / Cosmomatic / Airwave (Album Cut) / Conspiracy / Awakening (Radio Edit) / T.T.C. / Down From The Deep / Equilibrium / Such Is Life (Sunday Afternoon Rework) / Airwave (Sunset Chill-out Mix) / Passage To The Unknown / Still In My Mind / Such Is Life (Album Cut) / The Citrus Juicer
- 2020 Rank 1 - "Live At ASOT 950: inc. exclusive tracks Transatlantic Communication / Predictive Mmemory / No Name / Paris Nice Cannes"
- 2022 Rank 1 - "Symsonic Deluxe (20th Anniversary Celebration)"

Remixes

- 1999 York – Reachers of Civilization "(Rank 1 Remix)"
- 2000 Tunnel Allstars – Blue Lagoon "(Rank 1 Remixes)"
- 2000 System F – Cry "(Rank 1 Remix)"
- 2000 Mary Griffin – "Perfect Moment (Rank 1 Remix)"
- 2000 Cygnus X – "Superstring (Rank 1 Remixes)"
- 2000 Baby D – "Let Me Be Your Fantasy (Rank 1 Remixes)"
- 2000 Angelic – "It's My Turn (Rank 1 Remix)"
- 2000 Chakra – "Home (Rank 1 Remix)" [Unreleased]
- 2001 Ayumi Hamasaki – "Far Away (Rank 1 Remix)"
- 2001 Delerium feat. Rani – "Underwater (Rank 1 Remixes)"
- 2002 Gouryella – "Ligaya (Rank 1 Remix)" [Unreleased]
- 2002 Nu NRG – "Dreamland (Rank 1 Re-Edit)"
- 2002 Ayumi Hamasaki – "Dearest (Rank 1 Edit)"
- 2002 Marc Aurel – "Sound of Love (Rank 1 Remix)"
- 2002 DuMonde – "Mind Made Up (Rank 1 Remix)"
- 2003 M.I.K.E. – "Journey of Life (Rank 1 Remix)"
- 2004 Angel City – "Touch Me (Rank 1 Remix)"
- 2005 Mr Sam – Lyteo "(Rank 1 Remix)"
- 2005 ATB – Humanity "(Rank 1 Remix)"
- 2006 Ronald van Gelderen – "This Way (Rank 1 Remix)"
- 2006 Freddie Mercury – "Love Kills (Rank 1 Remixes)"
- 2007 Cosmic Gate – "Analog Feel (Rank 1's Digital Re-hash)"
- 2007 JOOP – "The Future (Trance Energy Anthem 2007) (Rank 1 Remix)"
- 2007 Alex Bartlett & Guess feat. Anthya – "Touch the Sun (Rank 1 Remix)"
- 2008 Anton Sonin & AMX feat. Sari – "Undone (Rank 1 Remix)"
- 2008 Marcel Woods feat. MC Da Silva – "On Fire (Rank 1's No This Ain't Trance Like '99 Remix)"
- 2008 Ronald van Gelderen – "Embrace Me (Rank 1 Remix)"
- 2008 Leon Bolier vs. Jonas Steur – "Lost Luggage (Rank 1 Remix)"
- 2010 Velvetine – "Safe (Wherever You Are) (Rank 1 Remix)"
- 2010 Mat Zo – "24 Hours (Rank 1 Remix)"
- 2011 Cosmic Gate – "Fire Wire (Rank 1 Remix)"
- 2011 Super8 & Tab feat. Julie Thompson – "My Enemy (Rank 1 Remix)"
- 2013 Conjure One feat. Leigh Nash – "Under the Gun (Rank 1 Remixes)"
- 2013 Giuseppe Ottaviani feat. Eric Lumiere – "Love Will Bring It All Around (Rank 1 Remix)"
- 2022 Aly & Fila feat. Jess - "Sunrise (Rank 1 Remix)"
- 2024 Lulleaux, BnO and Sem Rozendaal- "Take Me Away (Rank 1 Remix)"

As GAIA

Singles

2009 Gaia - "Tuvan" 2010 Gaia - "Aisha (SAIL Theme 2010)" 2011 Gaia - "Status Excessu D (A State Of Trance 500 Anthem)" 2011 Gaia - "Stellar" 2012 Gaia - "J'Ai Envie De Toi" 2014 Gaia - "Empire Of Hearts" 2014 Gaia - "Humming The Lights" 2015 Gaia - "In Principio" 2015 Gaia - "Carnation" 2016 Gaia - "Inyathi" 2017 Gaia - "Saint Vitus" 2017 Gaia - "Crossfire" 2019 Gaia - "Moons Of Jupiter [Sampler 01] inc. Euporie (Extended Mix) / Europa (Extended Mix) / Carpo (Extended Mix)" 2019 Gaia - "Moons Of Jupiter [Sampler 02] inc. Themisto (Extended Mix) / Himalia (Extended Mix) / Jupiter LXV (S2017J4) (Extended Mix) / Callisto (Extended Mix)" 2019 Gaia - "Moons Of Jupiter [Sampler 03] inc. Jupiter LXXI (S2018J1) (Extended Mix) / Lysithea (Extended Mix) / Elara (Extended Mix) / Io (Extended Mix)" 2019 Gaia - "Moons Of Jupiter [Sampler 04] inc. Dia [Computer Electronic] (Extended Mix) / Valetudo (Extended Mix) / Ganymede (Extended Mix) / - (Lost) (S2003J12) (Moons Of Jupiter) (Extended Mix)"

Albums

- 2019 Gaia - "Moons Of Jupiter inc. Metis / Adrastea / Amalthea / Thebe / Themisto / Leda / Himalia / upiter LXXI (S/2018J1) /

Jupiter LXV (S/2017J4) / Lysithea [Sine Square Noise] / Elara / Dia [Computer Electronic] / Carpo / Io / Europa / Ganymede / Callisto / Euporie / - (Lost) (S/2003J12) [Moons Of Jupiter] / Valetudo / Jupiter LX (S/2003J3)"

=== Co-productions ===
Various projects

- 1997 Precious People – Baby Freak
- 1997 Precious People – Reflections of Love
- 1997 Pedro & Benno – Scream for Love
- 1997 Simplistic Mind – Human Beast
- 1998 Benno – Freefall
- 1998 Two Disciples – To the Church
- 1998 Tritone – I Know You're There
- 1998 Jonah – Ssst... (Listen)
- 1998 R.O.O.S. - Living in a Dream
- 1998 Control Freaks – Subspace Interference
- 1998 System Eight – Play it Rough
- 1998 Pedro & Benno – Talkin' to You
- 1998 Kamaya Painters – "Endless Wave / Northern Spirit / Outstream"
- 1999 Gualagara – Human Planetarium
- 1999 Pedro & Benno – Speechless
- 1999 R.O.O.S. - Body, Mind & Spirit
- 1999 Van Gils & Benno De Goeij – I Don't Need You Anymore
- 1999 A.I.D.A. - Far and Away / Merit
- 1999 Kamaya Painters – Far from Over / Cryptomnesia / Soft Light
- 1999 A.I.D.A. - Remember Me / Corvana
- 1999 Dutch Force – Deadline
- 1999 AMbassador – One of These Days
- 1999 Phil Rodriguez – Closer (R.O.O.S.Remix)
- 1999 Nudge & Shouter – Blue Lagoon (Bervoets & De Goeij Remix)
- 1999 Pound & Harris – Formanterra (Bervoets & De Goeij Remix)
- 1999 Chicane – Lost You Somewhere (R.O.O.S. Remix)
- 1999 Cepheus 1 – Cut D Mid-Range (Bervoets & De Goeij Remix)
- 1999 Fourth Inc. - Trip to Julich (Bervoets & De Goeij Remix)
- 1999 Cygnus X – The Orange Theme (Bervoets & De Goeij Remix)
- 1999 Choopie & Ronie – Let It Go (Bervoets & De Goeij Remix)
- 1999 Neon – Getting Around (Bervoets & De Goeij Remix)
- 1999 Jens – Psycho Strings '99 (Bervoets & De Goeij Remix)
- 1999 Locus – Don't Give Up (A.I.D.A. Remix)
- 2000 Kamaya Painters – Wasteland / Summerbreeze
- 2000 Jonah – Yeah... Right
- 2000 SPX – Straight to the Point
- 2000 Legato – Small Town Boy (Bervoets & De Goeij Remix)
- 2000 DJ Jurgen – Higher & Higher (Dutch Force Remix)
- 2000 DJ Mellow D – At Night (Dutch Force Remix)
- 2001 M.O.R.P.H. - Maximum Overdrive (Benicio Remix)
- 2002 Allice Deejay – Will I Ever (Dutch Force Remix)
- 2002 M.O.R.P.H. - Consequence (Benicio Remix)
- 2002 Hands On Devine – Step By Step (Benicio Remix)
- 2003 Jacob And Mendez – Deception (Benicio Remix)
- 2003 Mac J – Perfect Blend / Deep Ranger
- 2004 Mac J – Nightware / Womaniser
- 2005 Johan Gielen – Dreamchild
- 2005 JOOP – The World / Another World
- 2006 Ronald van Gelderen – This Way
- 2006 Ronald van Gelderen – Realize
- 2007 Ronald van Gelderen – Dirty Rocker
- 2008 Ronald van Gelderen – Embrace Me
- 2010 Artento Divini – Griffin (Pleasure Island Anthem 2010)
- 2011 Within Temptation – Sinéad (Benno de Goeij Remix)
- 2014 Ayu – Terminal

With Jochen Miller

Singles

- 2008 Jochen Miller – "Lost Connection"
- 2008 Jochen Miller – "9 Minutes / Eclipse"
- 2009 Jochen Miller – "Face Value"
- 2009 Jochen Miller – "Brace Yourself"
- 2009 Jochen Miller – "Red One"
- 2010 Jochen Miller – "Humanoid"
- 2010 Jochen Miller – "Classified (Energy Theme 2011)"
- 2010 Jochen Miller – "uPad"
- 2011 Jochen Miller – "U and Eye"
- 2011 Jochen Miller – "Troucid"
- 2011 Jochen Miller – "One Day"
- 2011 Jochen Miller – "Flashback"
- 2011 Jochen Miller – "Bamm!"
- 2012 Jochen Miller – "Leap of Faith (Emporium Anthem 2012)"

Remixes

- 2010 Markus Schulz feat. Khaz – "Dark Heart Waiting (Jochen Miller Remix)"
- 2010 Armin van Buuren feat. Nadia Ali - "Feels So Good (Jochen Miller Remix)"
- 2010 Cosmic Gate – "Back 2 Earth (Jochen Miller Remix)"

With Armin van Buuren

- 2008 Armin van Buuren & DJ Shah feat. Chris Jones – "Going Wrong"
- 2008 Armin van Buuren feat. Jaren – "Unforgivable"
- 2008 Armin van Buuren feat. Jacqueline Govaerts – "Never Say Never"
- 2008 Armin van Buuren feat. feat. Audrey Gallagher – "Hold On to Me"
- 2008 Armin van Buuren "Face to Face"
- 2008 Armin van Buuren feat. Cathy Burtin – "Rain"
- 2008 Armin van Buuren feat. Sharon Den Adel – "In and Out of Love"
- 2008 Armin van Buuren feat. Vera Ostrova – "What If"
- 2009 Armin van Buuren feat. VanVelzen – "Broken Tonight"
- 2010 Armin van Buuren – "Full Focus"
- 2010 Armin van Buuren feat. Susana – "Desidirium 207"
- 2010 Armin van Buuren – "Mirage"
- 2010 Armin van Buuren feat. Christian Burns – "This Light Between Us"
- 2010 Armin van Buuren feat. Sophie Ellis-Bextor – "Not Giving Up on Love"
- 2010 Armin van Buuren – "I Don't Own You"
- 2010 Armin van Buuren feat. Winter Kills – "Take a Moment"
- 2010 Armin van Buuren feat. Nadia Ali – "Feels So Good"
- 2010 Armin van Buuren feat. Sophie Hunter – "Virtual Friend"
- 2010 Armin van Buuren feat. Laura V – "Drowning"
- 2010 Armin van Buuren feat. Ana Criado – "Down to Love"
- 2010 Armin van Buuren – "Coming Home"
- 2010 Armin van Buuren feat. BT – "These Silent Hearts"
- 2010 Armin van Buuren – "Orbion"
- 2010 Armin van Buuren feat. Adam Young – "Youtopia"
- 2010 Armin van Buuren feat. Fiora – "Breathe in Deep"
- 2010 Armin van Buuren feat. Van Velzen – "Take Me Where I Wanna Go"
- 2010 Armin van Buuren feat. Cathy Burton – "I Surrender"
- 2010 Armin van Buuren feat. Jessie Morgan – "Love Too Hard"
- 2011 ATB & Armin van Buuren – "Vice Versa"
- 2012 Armin van Buuren – "We Are Here to Make Some Noise"
- 2013 Armin van Buuren & Markus Schulz – "The Expedition (A State of Trance 600 Anthem)"
- 2013 Armin van Buuren & W&W – "D♯ Fat"
- 2013 Armin van Buuren feat. Fiora – "Waiting for the Night"
- 2013 Armin van Buuren feat. Trevor Guthrie – "This Is What It Feels Like"
- 2013 Armin van Buuren feat. Miri Ben-Ari – "Intense"
- 2013 Armin van Buuren feat. Cindy Alma – "Beautiful Life"
- 2013 Armin van Buuren – "Pulsar"
- 2013 Armin van Buuren feat. Laura Jansen – "Sound of the Drums"
- 2013 Armin van Buuren feat. Lauren Evans – "Alone"
- 2013 Armin van Buuren vs. NERVO feat. Laura V – "Turn This Love Around"
- 2013 Armin van Buuren feat. Aruna – "Won't Let You Go"
- 2013 Armin van Buuren – "In 10 Years from Now"
- 2013 Armin van Buuren – "Last Stop Before Heaven"
- 2013 Armin van Buuren feat. Emma Hewitt – "Forever Is Ours"
- 2013 Armin van Buuren feat. Richard Bedford – "Love Never Came"
- 2013 Armin van Buuren – "Who's Afraid of 138?!"
- 2013 Armin van Buuren feat. Bagga Bownz – "Reprise"
- 2014 Armin van Buuren feat. Cindy Alma – "Don't Want to Fight Love Away"
- 2014 Armin van Buuren – "Save My Night"
- 2014 Armin van Buuren – "Ping Pong"
- 2014 Armin van Buuren – "Hystereo"
- 2015 Armin van Buuren – "Together (in a State of Trance) (ASOT Festival Anthem)"
- 2015 Armin van Buuren presents Rising Star feat. Betsie Larkin – "Safe Inside You"
- 2015 Armin van Buuren feat. Mr Probz – "Another You"
- 2015 Armin van Buuren feat. Cimo Fränkel – "Strong Ones"
- 2015 Armin van Buuren feat. Eric Vloeimans – "Embrace"
- 2015 Armin van Buuren feat. Kensington – "Heading Up High"
- 2015 Armin van Buuren feat. BullySongs – "Freefall"
- 2015 Armin van Buuren feat. BullySongs – "Caught in the Slipstream"
- 2015 Armin van Buuren feat. Rock Mafia – "Hands to Heaven"
- 2015 Hardwell & Armin van Buuren – "Off the Hook"
- 2015 Armin van Buuren – "Old Skool"
- 2015 Armin van Buuren feat. DBX – "Indestructible"
- 2015 Armin van Buuren & Cosmic Gate – "Embargo"
- 2015 Armin van Buuren feat. Angel Taylor – "Make It Right"
- 2015 Armin van Buuren feat. Lyrica Anderson – "Gotta Be Love"
- 2015 Armin van Buuren feat. Sarah deCourcey – "Face of Summer"
- 2016 Armin van Buuren presents Rising Star feat. Betsie Larkin – "Again" (Armin van Buuren Remix)
- 2017 Armin van Buuren feat. Josh Cumbee – "Sunny Days"

Albums

- 2008 Armin van Buuren – Imagine
- 2010 Armin van Buuren – Mirage
- 2013 Armin van Buuren – Intense
- 2015 Armin van Buuren – Embrace
- 2019 Armin van Buuren – Balance
- 2021 Armin van Buuren – A State Of Trance Forever

Remixes

- 2008 Kerli – "Walking on Air (Armin van Buuren Remixes)"
- 2008 The Killers – "Human (Armin van Buuren Remixes)"
- 2009 BT feat. Jes – "Every Other Way (Armin van Buuren Remix)"
- 2010 Faithless – "Not Going Home (Armin van Buuren Remixes)"
- 2010 Dido – "Everything to Lose (Armin van Buuren Remix)"
- 2010 Miguel Bosé – "Jurame (Armin van Buuren Remix)"
- 2011 Nadine Coyle – "Put Your Hands Up (Armin Van Buuren Remix)"
- 2011 Emma Hewitt – "Colours (Armin van Buuren Remix)"
- 2011 Hannah – "Falling Away (Armin van Buuren Remix)"
- 2011 David Guetta feat. Usher – "Without You (Armin van Buuren Remix)"
- 2011 Wiegel Meirmans Snitker – "Nova Zembla (Armin van Buuren Remix)"
