= Not Giving Up on Love =

Single by Armin van Buuren vs. Sophie Ellis-Bextor

from the album Mirage and Make a Scene
- Released: 20 August 2010
- Studio: Armada Studios, Amsterdam
- Genre: Vocal trance
- Length: 2:53
- Label: Armind; Armada; Ultra
- Songwriters: Armin van Buuren; Benno de Goeij; Miriam Nervo; Olivia Nervo; Sophie Ellis-Bextor
- Producers: Armin van Buuren; Benno de Goeij

Armin van Buuren singles chronology
"Full Focus" (2010)	"Not Giving Up on Love" (2010)	"This Light Between Us" (2010)

Sophie Ellis-Bextor singles chronology
"Bittersweet" (2010)	"Not Giving Up on Love" (2010)	"Off & On" (2011)

"Not Giving Up on Love" is a collaboration between Dutch DJ and record producer Armin van Buuren and English singer Sophie Ellis-Bextor. It was released on 20 August 2010 as the second single from van Buuren's fourth studio album, Mirage, and the fourth single from Ellis-Bextor's fourth studio album, Make a Scene.

== Background and release ==
The song was written by Australian songwriters Olivia Nervo and Miriam Nervo and Sophie Ellis-Bextor. It premiered on BBC Radio 2's The Dermot O'Leary Show on 11 July 2010 when it was performed in an acoustic version by Sophie Ellis-Bextor. The extended version debuted on Armin van Buuren's radio show A State of Trance on 12 August 2010. On 5 December 2010 it was announced that the song entered the 2010 edition of the Q Top 1000 of all time, compiled by listeners of Dutch radio station Q-Music, on number 545. In the 2011 edition of the Q Top 1000 of all time, the song landed at number 409. The song was nominated at the "2011 International Dance Music Awards" in the category of "Best Commercial Dance Track" and "Best Trance Track", for which it won the award.

== Composition ==
"Not Giving Up On Love" (2010)
A 30 second sample of "Not Giving Up on Love".

"Not Giving Up on Love" is a trance song. It also features euphoric synths and pulsating beats. According to Idolator's Robbie Daw, the opening lyrics to 'Not Giving Up on Love' could almost be describing Sophie's feelings about her chart fortunes over the past year: "I know you’re feeling restless, like life’s not on your side/It’s weighing heavy on your mind." In the chorus, she sings: "Hold me now, nothing else matters, it’s just the two of us / And if it all falls down, nothing else matters, you know we’re strong enough / I’m not giving up, I’m not giving up on us / I said I’m not giving up, I’m not giving up on love."

== Critical reception ==
The song received positive reviews from most music critics. Jon O'Brien of AllMusic wrote that "on the warm and melancholic multi-layered trance of 'Not Giving Up on Love', she shows her Ibiza soundtrack days aren't as far behind her as first thought." Tom Hocknell of BBC Music commented, "The album’s purple patch continues with Van Buuren’s uplifting Not Giving Up on Love, which sounds like Chicane at the gym." Lewis Corner of Digital Spy awarded it four out of five stars, writing "The result is a club thumper more fabulous and heavy than a Big Fat Gypsy wedding dress." Robert Copsey also of Digital Spy called it "a club-thumping collaboration with superstar DJ Armin van Buuren." Clixie Music called it "typically Sophie, an anthem-driven track." Sputnikmusic's staff wrote that "the song exist only to excite. It's a sleeper club hit just waiting to happen."

== Music video ==
The video for "Not Giving Up on Love" was shot in Ibiza, Spain by British director Sophie Muller, as stated by Ellis-Bextor on an interview. The video shoot took place in San Antonio and the Amnesia Club during August 2010. It was premiered on 17 August 2010.

Van Buuren told MTV News:

"Sophie [Ellis-Bextor] was very keen on working with Sophie Muller. She's like the name in music video production. We wanted a video that was very beautiful. Sophie Ellis-Bextor is a beautiful person to look at. She's an amazing performer, and I was like, 'I have my residency at Amnesia [a marquee club on the island], why not just do a video in Ibiza?' And everybody was like, 'OK!'".

Inter-cut with shots of Ellis-Bextor soaking up the sun is a club scene showing the pair performing the song. Van Buuren told MTV News the shoot was the first live attempt at the song in which the duo performed. Said the Dutch trance music star: "It was really crazy because we only had one take to do it live. We had [about] eight cameras rolling, and it was like, 'Sophie is gonna be here. She's gonna rock the track live for you guys. We are shooting a video and we only have one take to do it. So you better be enthusiastic!'".

== Track listing ==
- Digital download — The Remixes Part 1
1. "Not Giving Up on Love" (album version) – 2:53
2. "Not Giving Up on Love" (extended version) – 6:52
3. "Not Giving Up on Love" (Dash Berlin 4AM mix) – 7:06
4. "Not Giving Up on Love" (Jorn van Deynhoven remix) – 6:54
- Digital download — The Remixes Part 2
1. "Not Giving Up on Love" (Armin van Buuren remix) – 7:01
2. "Not Giving Up on Love" (Mischa Daniels mode) – 7:04
3. "Not Giving Up on Love" (Glenn Morrison remix) – 7:29
4. "Not Giving Up on Love" (Jorn van Deynhoven dub mix) – 6:54
- Juno digital download
1. "Not Giving Up on Love" (Nicola Fasano and Steve Forest remix edit) – 3:09
2. "Not Giving Up on Love" (Paul and Luke remix edit) – 3:36
3. "Not Giving Up on Love" (Samuele Sartini remix edit) – 3:33
4. "Not Giving Up on Love" (Simon de Jano remix edit) – 4:00
5. "Not Giving Up on Love" (Nicola Fasano and Steve Forest remix) – 5:39
6. "Not Giving Up on Love" (Paul and Luke remix) – 6:38
7. "Not Giving Up on Love" (Samuele Sartini remix) – 6:14
8. "Not Giving Up on Love" (Simon de Jano remix) – 6:44
- German CD single
1. "Not Giving Up on Love" (radio version) – 2:53
2. "Not Giving Up on Love" (extended version) – 6:52
3. "Not Giving Up on Love" (Dash Berlin 4AM mix) – 7:06
4. "Not Giving Up on Love" (Jorn van Deynhoven remix) – 6:54
5. "Not Giving Up on Love" (Mischa Daniels mode) – 7:04
6. "Not Giving Up on Love" (Glenn Morrison remix) – 7:29
- UK digital download — The Remixes Part 1
1. "Not Giving Up on Love" (radio edit) – 2:53
2. "Not Giving Up on Love" (extended version) – 6:52
3. "Not Giving Up on Love" (Armin van Buuren remix) – 7:01
4. "Not Giving Up on Love" (Jorn van Deynhoven remix) – 6:54
5. "Not Giving Up on Love" (Dash Berlin 4AM mix) – 7:06
6. "Not Giving Up on Love" (Zodiax dub mix) – 5:26
- UK digital download — The Remixes Part 2
1. "Not Giving Up on Love" (Zodiax remix) – 5:45
2. "Not Giving Up on Love" (Mischa Daniels mode) – 7:05
3. "Not Giving Up on Love" (Glenn Morrison remix) – 7:29
4. "Not Giving Up on Love" (Jorg Schmid remix) – 5:22
5. "Not Giving Up on Love" (Jorn van Deynhoven dub mix) – 6:54
6. "Not Giving Up on Love" (Zodiax radio edit) – 3:19

== Charts ==
=== Weekly charts ===
Weekly chart performance for "Not Giving Up on Love"
Chart (2010–2011)	Peak position
Belgium (Ultratop 50 Flanders)	26
Belgium (Ultratip Bubbling Under Wallonia)	24
CIS Airplay (TopHit)	3
Netherlands (Dutch Top 40)	13
Netherlands (Single Top 100)	8
Poland Airplay (ZPAV)	1
Poland (Polish Airplay TV)	1
Poland (Dance Top 50)	21
Russia Airplay (TopHit)	3
UK Dance (Official Charts)	27
Ukraine Airplay (TopHit)	36
US Dance/Electronic Digital Songs (Billboard)	36
US Dance Airplay (Billboard)	3

=== Year-end charts ===
2010 year-end chart performance for "Not Giving Up on Love"
Chart (2010)	Peak position
CIS (TopHit)	63
Netherlands (Single Top 100)	89
Netherlands (Download Top 100)	90
Russia Airplay (TopHit)	61

2011 year-end chart performance for "Not Giving Up on Love"
Chart (2011)	Peak position
CIS (TopHit)	117
Russia Airplay (TopHit)	111
Ukraine Airplay (TopHit)	180

== Personnel ==
Songwriting	Olivia Nervo; Miriam Nervo; Sophie Ellis-Bextor
Composition and production	Armin van Buuren; Benno de Goeij
Vocal production and backing vocals	Olivia Nervo; Miriam Nervo
Vocals	Sophie Ellis-Bextor
Mastering	Joe LaPorta; Emily Lazar

Source: Not Giving Up on Love (liner notes). Armin van Buuren vs. Sophie Ellis-Bextor. Armada Music. 2010.

== Release history ==
Region	Date	Format
Worldwide	20 August 2010	Digital download
Netherlands	27 August 2010	CD single
Germany	27 August 2010	CD single
Austria	27 August 2010	CD single
Italy	11 January 2011	Digital download
United Kingdom	6 March 2011	Digital download
