= This Light Between Us =

Single by Armin van Buuren featuring Christian Burns

from the album Mirage and Simple Modern Answers
- Released: 13 December 2010
- Studio: Armada Studios, Amsterdam
- Genre: Vocal trance
- Length: 3:17 (radio edit); 5:09 (album version)
- Label: Armind; Armada; Ultra
- Songwriters: Armin van Buuren; Benno de Goeij; Christian Burns
- Producers: Armin van Buuren; Benno de Goeij

Armin van Buuren singles chronology
"Not Giving Up on Love" (2010)	"This Light Between Us" (2010)	"Drowning" (2011)

Christian Burns singles chronology
"Forget Me" (2010)	"This Light Between Us" (2010)	"Tokyo Cries" (2011)

This Page is for the 2010 single by Armin van Buuren Featuring Christian Burns for the book of the same title see Andrew Fukuda.

"This Light Between Us" is a song by Dutch disc jockey and producer Armin van Buuren with vocals from English singer and songwriter Christian Burns. It was released on 13 December 2010 in the Netherlands as the third single from van Buuren's fourth studio album, Mirage, and as the first single from Burns' first studio album, Simple Modern Answers.

== Music video ==
The music video was released to Armada Music's YouTube channel on 25 November 2010. It is a live recording from the Armin Only: Mirage concert on 13 November 2010 in the Jaarbeurs in Utrecht. The video includes the Metropool Orchestra playing and Christian Burns singing live in front of 15.000 visitors.

== Track listing ==
US digital download (UL2730)

1. "This Light Between Us" (radio edit) – 3:17
2. "This Light Between Us" – 5:19

Netherlands digital download (ARMD1085)

1. "This Light Between Us" (Armin van Buuren's Great Strings mix) – 7:22
2. "This Light Between Us" (Richard Durand remix) – 6:27
3. "This Light Between Us" (Dabruck & Klein remix) – 7:02
4. "This Light Between Us" (album version) – 5:09

Netherlands 12" (ARMD1085)

1. "This Light Between Us" (Armin van Buuren's Great Strings mix) – 7:22
2. "This Light Between Us" (album version) – 6:27
3. "This Light Between Us" (Richard Durand remix) – 7:02
4. "This Light Between Us" (Dabruck & Klein remix) – 5:09

== Charts ==
=== Weekly charts ===
Weekly chart performance for "This Light Between Us"
Chart (2011)	Peak position
Poland Dance (ZPAV)	26
Russia Airplay (TopHit)	9
Ukraine Airplay (TopHit)	8

=== Year-end charts ===
2011 year-end chart performance for "This Light Between Us"
Chart (2011)	Position
Russia Airplay (TopHit)	37
Ukraine Airplay (TopHit)	49

2012 year-end chart performance for "This Light Between Us"
Chart (2012)	Position
Russia Airplay (TopHit)	185
