= Olaf Blackwood =

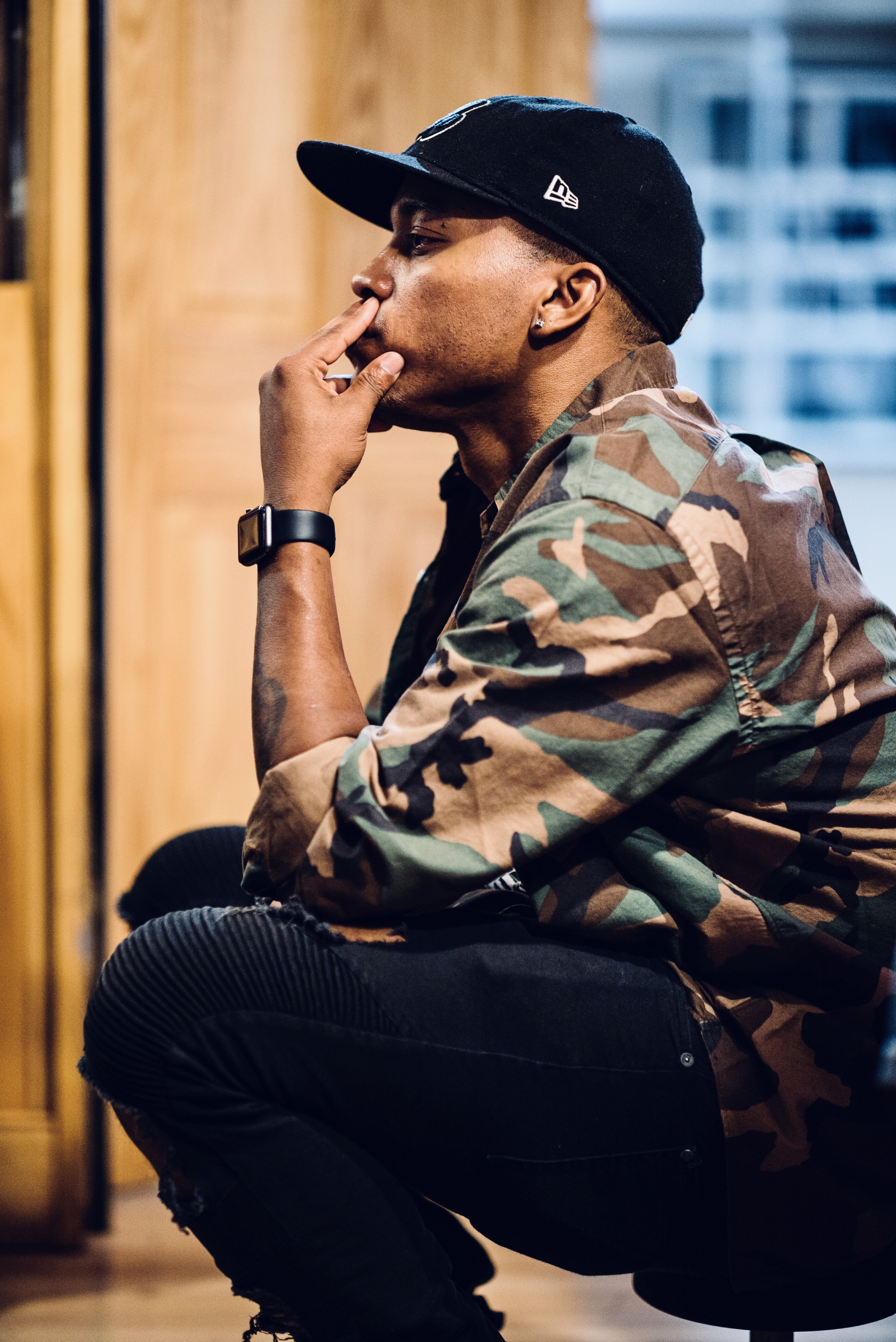
- Blackwood in 2019

Background information
- Born: 5 November 1980 (age 45); Lacovia, Saint Elizabeth Parish, Jamaica
- Genres: Reggae; Dancehall; Pop; EDM; hip hop
- Occupations: Singer; songwriter; rapper; record producer; entrepreneur
- Years active: 1995–present

Olaf Blackwood (born 5 November 1980) is a Jamaican singer-songwriter and record producer.

== Early life ==
Blackwood was born in Lacovia, a village in Jamaica's Saint Elizabeth Parish, where he helped support his family's farm throughout his childhood. As a child, his two passions were soccer and music. Inspired by his uncle Errol Blackwood, the lead singer of reggae band Messenjah, Blackwood dropped out of school at sixteen and traveled to Kingston to pursue a music career.

== Career ==
Blackwood recorded his first single for Garnett Silk's record label in 1995. He then released music for Mario C Productions on the Artillery rhythm. After struggling to find success in Jamaica, Blackwood migrated to the United States in 2002. In the United States, he has written and produced songs for entertainers such as Shaggy and Tessanne Chin.

Blackwood achieved commercial success in 2017 with the single "I Need You", an Armin van Buuren and Fernando Garibay song for which Blackwood served as a featured vocalist. "I Need You" was certified platinum by the RIAA and peaked at #7 on Billboard's Digital Song Sales chart.

Blackwood also mentors aspiring songwriters through his publishing company, Holland Bamboo Publishing.

== Feature discography ==
Year	Title	Artist	Album	Source
2016	"Can't Lie"	Safaree	Real Yard Vibes	
2017	"I Need You"	Armin van Buuren and Fernando Garibay	N/A	
2019	"Keep on Calling"	Niiko x SWAE	N/A	
2019	"Love Me Now"	Shaggy	Wah Gwaan?! (bonus track)	
2020	"Don't Say That"	Miles Away and VENIICE	N/A	
2021	"On Your Mind"	Spice	10	
