= Vini Vici =

Israeli psytrance music group

Background information
- Also known as: Sesto Sento (2001–2013)
- Origin: Israel
- Genres: Psychedelic trance, electronica, electronic rock
- Years active: 2001–present
- Members: Matan Kadosh; Aviram Saharai
- Past members: Itai Spector; Dror Elkayam

Vini Vici is an Israeli psytrance DJ duo from Afula. The group was originally formed in 2001 under the name of Sesto Sento by the producers Matan Kadosh, Aviram Saharai, and Itai Spector; Spector left in 2011. In 2013, Kadosh and Saharai continued their musical activities under the name 'Vini Vici'.

== History ==
=== Sesto Sento (2001–2013) ===
Aged 15, Saharai and Spector were classmates in high school who started producing 'trancey music' under the name 'Sesto Sento'. They were soon joined by the 17-year-old Kadosh, who had earned a reputation as the school's DJ; within a week the three had produced their first album, released in 2001. The trio's album Come Together (2006) has achieved Gold Record status. They also made a more techno type of music under the name of 'Ferbi Boys'. Spector became more religious over the course of two years, retreating from public appearances before abandoning the band in 2011 to live a more Orthodox Jewish life. He had concluded that playing music was incompatible with being strictly Jewish Orthodox, but remained good friends with Saharai and Kadosh in the years thereafter. After Spector left the band, producer and guitarist Dror Elkayam joined Sesto Sento, but later also quit the group.

Matan Kadosh also accomplished solo psytrance project under the name Gataka, releasing five albums in 2003–2009.

=== Vini Vici (2013–present) ===
In 2013, Aviram Saharai and Matan Kadosh continued their musical activities under the name of 'Vini Vici', which they described as 'a new project'. Vini Vici's international success came in 2015, as "The Tribe" (which Saharai called 'the biggest essence' of what would become Vini Vici's style), from their first album Future Classics was praised by many of their fans. Saharai stated: 'We understood we want to have world music, with psytrance. We wanted to mix these two worlds.' Initially doing the rounds in the psytrance underground, the track became a commercial success when EDM DJs started playing it, and thereby put Vini Vici on the map. By 2019, "The Tribe" had more than 11 million streams on Spotify.

Vini Vici also made a remix for Hilight Tribe's song "Free Tibet", which by 2019 had achieved over 94 million plays on YouTube. Later, in 2016, they collaborated with Dutch trance producer Armin van Buuren and Hilight Tribe on a song called "Great Spirit". The song surpassed a million plays in a week.

In 2017, Vini Vici had released several singles such as "FKD Up Kids" and "Ravers Army." After that, Dutch hardstyle producer Wildstylez made a remix of "Great Spirit" in July 2017. They also released a song with Dutch big room duo W&W called "Chakra" which reached the #1 spot on the Beatport Psy-Trance Chart within 24 hours of release.

In 2018, Vini Vici launched their own psytrance label called Alteza Records, as part of Armada Music distribution, and also released some collaborations such as "100" with Timmy Trumpet, "The House Of House" with Dimitri Vegas & Like Mike, and "Moshi Moshi" with Steve Aoki. That year, they took the main stage at the Belgian EDM festival Tomorrowland and made their debut at Zouk Singapore.. In 2025, the Israeli DJ duo Vini Vici incorporated a spiritual message from Rabbi Shlomo Yehouda Be’eri at the opening of their set at the Tomorrowland festival.

Vini Vici make music mostly under Alteza Records, whose other signed artists include Blastoyz, Skazi, WHITENO1SE, Reality Test, Omiki, Eddie Bitar, Indecent Noise, Animato, Gaudium, Phanatic, XYZed, Major7, Ghost Rider, Hi Profile, Off Limits, CoExist, Bizzare Contact, Berg, Dego, PANGEA, Alchimyst, P.R.O.G., Diego Miranda, Paul van Dyk, and Morten Granau.

In 2019, Alteza Records became a sublabel of Smash the House.

== Discography ==
=== Albums ===
As Sesto Sento

- The Inner Light (Com.Pact Records, 2002)
- The Year 83 EP / After Dark (Shiva Space Technology, 2003)
- The Bright Side (Com.Pact Records, 2003)
- The Remixer (Com.Pact Records, 2005)
- Come Together (Com.Pact Records, 2006)
- Key to The Universe (Com.Pact Records, 2008)
- What Are You Waiting For? (Com.Pact Records, 2010)
- ET Phone (Com.Pact Records, 2011)
- P.L.U.R (2012)
- Eleven Years of Music (2012)
- Science Art Wonder (2015)

As Vini Vici

- Future Classics (2015)

=== Compilations ===
As Sesto Sento

- B.P.M. - Bionic Pulse Method (Agitato Records, 2002)
- B.P.M. - Bionic Pulse Method Vol. 2 (Agitato Records, 2003)
- Afula On (Com.Pact Records, 2004)
- Afula On Vol. 2 (Com.Pact Records 2008)
- Journey Through Time (2010)
- P.L.U.R (Remixes) (2012)

As Vini Vici

- Part of the Dream – Compiled by Vini Vici (2017)
- "Be Light" (Hatikva 6, Vini Vici, Darwish (musician)" (2026)
