= This Is What It Feels Like =

2013 single by Armin van Buuren featuring Trevor Guthrie

Single by Armin van Buuren featuring Trevor Guthrie

from the album Intense
- Released: 5 April 2013
- Recorded: 2012
- Studio: Armada Studios, Amsterdam
- Genre: Progressive trance; progressive house; dance-pop
- Length: 3:25 (radio edit); 5:20 (original mix)
- Label: Armind; Armada
- Songwriters: Armin van Buuren; Benno de Goeij; Jenson Vaughan; Trevor Guthrie; John Ewbank
- Producers: Armin van Buuren; Benno de Goeij; Jenson Vaughan

Armin van Buuren singles chronology
"D# Fat" (2013)	"This Is What It Feels Like" (2013)	"Beautiful Life" (2013)

Trevor Guthrie singles chronology
"This Is What It Feels Like" (2013)	"Soundwave" (2014)

"This Is What It Feels Like" is a song by Dutch DJ and record producer Armin van Buuren, featuring Canadian singer, songwriter and former soulDecision frontman Trevor Guthrie, released in the Netherlands by Armada Music on 5 April 2013 as the second single from van Buuren's fifth studio album, Intense (2013).

"This Is What It Feels Like" peaked at number three on the Dutch Top 40. Outside the Netherlands, "This Is What It Feels Like" peaked within the top ten of the charts in ten countries, including Austria, Belgium (Flanders), Canada, Israel and the United Kingdom.

The song was written by Armin van Buuren, Benno de Goeij, Jenson Vaughan, Trevor Guthrie and John Ewbank, and produced by Vaughan and Ewbank. Van Buuren wrote the instrumental with de Goeij and Ewbank in 2012. Trevor Guthrie wrote the lyrics with Jenson Vaughan, and it was inspired by Guthrie's neighbour who was diagnosed with a brain tumor. "This Is What It Feels Like" was nominated for the 2014 Grammy Award for Best Dance Recording. The song was featured in the intro for a 2019 episode of America's Got Talent.

== Music video ==
A music video to accompany the release of "This is What It Feels Like" was first released on YouTube on 17 March 2013. The video also features a guest appearance by American porn actor Ron Jeremy.

== Track listing ==
- Digital downloads
1. "This Is What It Feels Like" – 3:25
2. "This Is What It Feels Like" (extended mix) – 5:16
3. "This Is What It Feels Like" (W&W remix) – 6:16
4. "This Is What It Feels Like" (David Guetta remix) – 5:28
5. "This Is What It Feels Like" (Antillas and Dankann remix) – 5:44
6. "This Is What It Feels Like" (Antillas and Dankann radio edit) – 3:34
7. "This Is What It Feels Like" (Giuseppe Ottaviani remix) – 6:38
8. "This Is What It Feels Like" (Giuseppe Ottaviani radio edit) – 3:55
9. "This Is What It Feels Like" (John Ewbank classical remix) – 3:12
- UK CD single
1. "This Is What It Feels Like" – 3:25
2. "This Is What It Feels Like" (extended mix) – 5:16
3. "This Is What It Feels Like" (W&W remix) – 6:16
4. "Waiting for the Night" – 3:03
- German CD single
1. "This Is What It Feels Like" – 3:25
2. "This Is What It Feels Like" (David Guetta remix) – 5:28
- Maddix remix
1. "This Is What It Feels Like" (Maddix remix) – 3:50
2. "This Is What It Feels Like" (Maddix extended mix) – 4:50

== Charts ==
=== Weekly charts ===
Chart (2013)	Peak position
Australia (ARIA)	13
Australia Dance (ARIA)	2
Austria (Ö3 Austria Top 40)	7
Belgium (Ultratop 50 Flanders)	8
Belgium Dance (Ultratop Flanders)	7
Belgium (Ultratop 50 Wallonia)	17
Belgium Dance (Ultratop Flanders)	4
Canada Hot 100 (Billboard)	6
Czech Republic Airplay (ČNS IFPI)	11
France (SNEP)	170
Germany (GfK)	42
Hungary (Dance Top 40)	32
Hungary (Rádiós Top 40)	9
Ireland (IRMA)	32
Israel International Airplay (Media Forest)	8
Italy (FIMI)	27
Mexico Ingles Airplay (Billboard)	31
Netherlands (Dutch Top 40)	3
Netherlands (Single Top 100)	2
Poland Dance (ZPAV)	30
Russia Airplay (TopHit)	5
Scottish Singles Sales (Official Charts)	2
Slovakia Airplay (ČNS IFPI)	3
Slovenia (SloTop50)	29
Sweden (Sverigetopplistan)	31
Switzerland (Schweizer Hitparade)	15
UK Singles (Official Charts)	6
UK Dance (Official Charts)	4
Ukraine Airplay (TopHit)	31
US Billboard Hot 100	96
US Pop Airplay (Billboard)	31
US Dance Club Songs (Billboard)	35
US Hot Dance/Electronic Songs (Billboard)	10

=== Year-end charts ===
Chart (2013)	Position
Australia (ARIA)	85
Australia Dance (ARIA)	18
Austria (Ö3 Austria Top 40)	38
Belgium (Ultratop 50 Flanders)	37
Belgium Dance (Ultratop Flanders)	27
Belgium (Ultratop 50 Wallonia)	90
Belgium Dance (Ultratop Wallonia)	17
Canada (Canadian Hot 100)	19
Hungary (Rádiós Top 40)	59
Italy (FIMI)	84
Netherlands (Dutch Top 40)	4
Netherlands (Dutch Top 40) John Ewbank remix	127
Netherlands (Single Top 100)	7
Russia Airplay (TopHit)	50
Sweden (Sverigetopplistan)	87
Ukraine Airplay (TopHit)	143
UK Singles (Official Charts Company)	59
US Hot Dance/Electronic Songs (Billboard)	23

== Certifications ==
Region	Certification	Certified units/sales
Australia (ARIA)	Platinum	70,000^{^}
Belgium (BRMA)	Gold	15,000^{*}
Canada (Music Canada)	3× Platinum	240,000^{‡}
Denmark (IFPI Danmark)	Gold	45,000^{‡}
Germany (BVMI)	Gold	150,000^{‡}
Italy (FIMI)	Platinum	30,000^{‡}
Netherlands (NVPI)	2× Platinum	40,000^{^}
New Zealand (RMNZ)	Gold	15,000^{‡}
United Kingdom (BPI)	Platinum	600,000^{‡}
^{*} Sales figures based on certification alone.^{^} Shipments figures based on certification alone.^{‡} Sales+streaming figures based on certification alone.

== Release history ==
Region	Date	Format	Label
Netherlands	29 April 2013	Digital download	Armada
United Kingdom	3 May 2013	Digital download	Armada
United Kingdom	6 May 2013	CD single	Armada
Germany	31 May 2013	CD single	Armada

== Jason Benoit version ==
"This Is What It Feels Like"

Single by Jason Benoit
- Released: 10 September 2013
- Genre: Country
- Length: 3:47
- Label: Sky Hit
- Songwriters: Armin van Buuren; Benno de Goeij; Jenson Vaughan; Trevor Guthrie; John Ewbank
- Producers: Brandon DeMarco; Dave Thompson

Jason Benoit singles chronology
"This Is What It Feels Like" (2013)	"Crazy Kinda Love" (2014)

"This Is What It Feels Like" was covered by Canadian country music artist Jason Benoit and released through Sky Hit Records, under license to Sony Music Canada, as Benoit's debut single on 10 September 2013. His rendition reached number 46 on the Billboard Canada Country chart. It received positive reviews for Benoit's "strong vocal performance" was also included on the compilation album, Country Heat 2014.

=== Music video ===
An official lyric video was uploaded to Benoit's Vevo channel on 4 October 2013.

=== Chart performance ===
Chart (2013)	Peak position
Canada Country (Billboard)	46
