= Alone (Armin van Buuren song) =

2014 single by Armin van Buuren

Single by Armin van Buuren featuring Lauren Evans

from the album Intense
- Released: 7 March 2014
- Studio: Armada Studios, Amsterdam
- Genre: Progressive house
- Length: 3:19 (radio edit); 6:49 (extended mix)
- Label: Armind; Armada
- Songwriter(s): Armin van Buuren; Benno de Goeij; Lauren Evans; Victoria Horn; Dernst Emile II
- Producer(s): Armin van Buuren; Benno de Goeij

Armin van Buuren singles chronology
"Save My Night" (2014)	"Alone" (2014)	"Ping Pong" (2014)

Lauren Evans singles chronology
"Time of Your Life" (2010)	"Alone" (2014)	"Maybe Tonight" (2015)

"Alone" is a song by Dutch disc jockey and record producer Armin van Buuren. It features vocals and lyrics from American singer and songwriter Lauren Evans. The song was released in the Netherlands by Armada Music on 7 March 2014 as the sixth single from van Buuren's fifth studio album Intense.

== Music video ==
A music video to accompany the release of "Alone" was first released onto YouTube on 27 February 2014. It was directed by Svenno Koemans. The music video was shot in Los Angeles at the crossroads between Broadway and 8th Street. It shows cars arrested in front of the crossroads. The first is driven by Lauren Evans. The second is driven by a man alongside Armin van Buuren. The others driven by people who are breaking their relationships with their partner. Then an old man faints on the pedestrian crossing. But nobody cares of him. Only Evans and van Buuren try to save him. They ask help to the other passengers who ignore the situation. At the end, the man regains consciousness.

== Track listing ==
- Digital download / CD single (ARMAS1031)
1. "Alone" (Radio Edit) – 3:19
- Digital download - Thomas Newson Remix (ARMAD1186)
1. "Alone" (Thomas Newson Remix) - 5:15
- Digital download - Thomas Newson Remixes (ARMAD1186A)
1. "Alone" (Thomas Newson Radio Edit) – 3:37
2. "Alone" (Thomas Newson Remix) - 5:15
- More Intense - Orjan Nilsen Remix
1. "Alone" (Orjan Nilsen Remix) - 7:40

== Charts ==
Chart (2013)	Peak position
Netherlands (Single Top 100)	89
US Dance/Mix Show Airplay (Billboard)	6
