= Beautiful Life (Armin van Buuren song) =

Single by Armin van Buuren featuring Cindy Alma

from the album Intense
- Released: 20 September 2013
- Studio: Armada Studios, Amsterdam
- Genre: Progressive house; progressive trance; dance-pop
- Length: 2:59 (radio edit); 6:08 (original mix)
- Label: Armind; Armada
- Songwriters: Armin van Buuren; Benno de Goeij; Cyndi Almouzni; Paul Barry
- Producers: Armin van Buuren; Benno de Goeij

Armin van Buuren singles chronology
"This Is What It Feels Like" (2013)	"Beautiful Life" (2013)	"Intense" (2013)

Cindy Alma singles chronology
"I'll Leave My Heart" (2007)	"Beautiful Life" (2013)	"Sad Song" (2016)

"Beautiful Life" is a song by Dutch DJ and record producer Armin van Buuren. It features vocals and lyrics from French singer and songwriter Cindy Alma. The song was released in the Netherlands by Armada Music as a digital download on 20 September 2013 as the third single from van Buuren's fifth studio album Intense (2013). It was written by van Buuren, Alma and Paul Barry and produced by van Buuren and Benno de Goeij. A French version of the song was released the next year.

== Music video ==
A music video to accompany the release of "Beautiful Life" was first released onto YouTube on 18 August 2013. The music video was shot in New York City.

== Track listing ==
- Digital download (ARMA351)
1. "Beautiful Life" (radio edit) – 2:59
- CD single (ARMA351)
1. "Beautiful Life" (radio edit) – 2:59
2. "Beautiful Life" (original mix) – 6:08
3. "Beautiful Life" (Mikkas remix) – 5:37
4. "Beautiful Life" (Mikkas radio edit) – 3:56
5. "Beautiful Life" (Protoculture remix) – 5:41
6. "Beautiful Life" (Protoculture radio edit) – 3:34
- Remixes – digital download (ARMD1160A)
1. "Beautiful Life" (Mikkas radio edit) – 3:56
2. "Beautiful Life" (Protoculture radio edit) – 3:34
3. "Beautiful Life" (Mikkas remix) – 5:37
4. "Beautiful Life" (Protoculture remix) – 5:41
- French version – digital download (ARMD1169)
1. "Beautiful Life" (French original mix) – 6:10
2. "Beautiful Life" (French radio edit) – 3:28

== Charts ==
=== Weekly charts ===
Weekly chart performance for "Beautiful Life"
Chart (2013)	Peak position
Austria (Ö3 Austria Top 40)	17
Belgium (Ultratip Bubbling Under Flanders)	17
Netherlands (Dutch Top 40)	29
Netherlands (Single Top 100)	66

=== Year-end charts ===
2013 year-end chart performance for "Beautiful Life"
Chart (2013)	Position
Netherlands (Dutch Top 40)	132
