= We Are Here to Make Some Noise =

2012 single by Armin van Buuren

Single by Armin van Buuren
- Released: 9 May 2012
- Studio: Armada Studios, Amsterdam
- Genre: Electro trance
- Length: 3:05
- Label: Armind; Armada
- Songwriters: Armin van Buuren; Benno de Goeij
- Producers: Armin van Buuren; Benno de Goeij

Armin van Buuren singles chronology
"Belter" (2012)	"We Are Here to Make Some Noise" (2012)	"I'll Listen" (2012)

"We Are Here to Make Some Noise" is an instrumental single by Dutch DJ and record producer Armin van Buuren. The track was released in the Netherlands by Armada Music as a digital download on 9 May 2012.

== Background ==
Van Buuren wrote the piece for the celebration of 2012's Queensday in the Netherlands and in preparation for the UEFA Euro 2012.

== Music video ==
A music video to accompany the track was released to YouTube on 31 May 2012.

== Track listing ==
- Digital download (ARMD1124)
1. "We Are Here to Make Some Noise" (radio edit) – 3:05
2. "We Are Here to Make Some Noise" (extended mix) – 5:12
- Remixes – digital download (ARMD1126)
1. "We Are Here to Make Some Noise" (Judge Jules remix) – 6:22
2. "We Are Here to Make Some Noise" (Judge Jules edit) – 3:06
3. "We Are Here to Make Some Noise" (Antillas & Dankann remix) – 6:34
4. "We Are Here to Make Some Noise" (Antillas & Dankann edit) – 3:09
5. "We Are Here to Make Some Noise" (Maison & Dragen remix) – 6:35
6. "We Are Here to Make Some Noise" (Maison & Dragen edit) – 3:30
7. "We Are Here to Make Some Noise" (The Scumfrog remix) – 8:07
8. "We Are Here to Make Some Noise" (The Scumfrog edit) – 3:25

== Charts ==
Chart (2012)	Peak position
Netherlands (Dutch Top 40)	23
Netherlands (Single Top 100)	24
