= Save My Night =

2014 single by Armin van Buuren

Single by Armin van Buuren

from the album Intense (The More Intense Edition)
- Released: 6 January 2014
- Recorded: Armada Studios, Amsterdam
- Genre: Progressive trance
- Length: 2:52 (radio edit); 5:34 (original mix)
- Label: Armind; Armada
- Songwriters: Armin van Buuren; Benno de Goeij
- Producers: Armin van Buuren; Benno de Goeij

Armin van Buuren singles chronology
"Intense" (2013)	"Save My Night" (2014)	"Alone" (2014)

"Save My Night" is the single by Dutch disc jockey and record producer Armin van Buuren. The single was released in the Netherlands by Armada Music on 6 January 2014 as the fifth single from van Buuren's fifth studio album Intense. The single is only included in the deluxe edition of the album titled "More Intense Edition".

It was the official music track of "Enjoy Heineken Responsibly " 2014 publicity campaign.

== Music video ==
A music video to accompany the release of "Save My Night" was first released onto YouTube on 6 January 2014. The music video was shot in Miami, Florida. It shows Armin van Buuren arriving incognito in a Miamian night bar where the atmosphere seems negative. He decides to uncover himself and to get on stage. He starts to play the chorus of the song which makes people reacting to the music. The music video was released in the context of the "Enjoy Heineken Responsibly" 2014 campaign.

== Track listing ==
- Digital download / CD single (ARMAS1022)
1. "Save My Night" (radio edit) – 2:52
- Digital download (ARMAS1022)
1. "Save My Night" (original mix) – 5:37
- Digital download – Blasterjaxx remix (ARMD1172)
1. "Save My Night" (Blasterjaxx remix) – 5:26
- Digital download – Blasterjaxx remixes (ARMAS1033)
1. "Save My Night" (Blasterjaxx radio edit) – 3:28
2. "Save My Night" (Blasterjaxx remix) – 5:26
- Digital download – remixes (ARMD1176)
1. "Save My Night" (Allen Watts remix) – 7:31
2. "Save My Night" (MaRLo remix) – 5:36
- Digital download – Mark Sixma remix (ARMD1202)
1. "Save My Life" (Mark Sixma remix) – 5:20
- Digital download – Mark Sixma remixes (ARMD1202A)
1. "Save My Night" (Mark Sixma radio edit) – 3:38
2. "Save My Night" (Mark Sixma remix) – 5:20
- Digital download – Andrew Rayel remix (ARMD1209)
1. "Save My Night" (Andrew Rayel remix) – 5:47
- Digital download – Andrew Rayel remixes (ARMD1209A)
1. "Save My Night" (Andrew Rayel radio edit) – 3:26
2. "Save My Night" (Andrew Rayel remix) – 5:47

== Charts ==
Chart (2013)	Peak position
Belgium (Ultratip Bubbling Under Flanders)	36
Netherlands (Dutch Top 40)	24
Netherlands (Single Top 100)	23
Poland Dance (ZPAV)	31
UK Singles (OCC)	85
US Hot Dance/Electronic Songs (Billboard)	20
