= Bullet (Christian Burns song) =

Single by Christian Burns

from the album Simple Modern Answers
- Released: 2 July 2012
- Recorded: 2012
- Genre: Progressive house, progressive trance
- Length: 3:23 (Single Edit); 6:32 (Club Mix)
- Label: Armada Music; Zouk Recordings
- Songwriter(s): Christian Burns

Christian Burns singles chronology
"Silver Splits the Blue" (2012)	"Bullet" (2012)	"As We Collide" (2012)

"Bullet" is the debut solo single by Christian Burns, released in 2012. The song has since been remixed by KhoMha, Mischa Daniels, Dirt Cheap, Sven Kirchkof and Falko Niestolik. It is included on Burns's first solo album Simple Modern Answers.

== Track listing ==
Bullet
No.	Title	Length
1.	"Bullet (Single Edit)"	3:23
2.	"Bullet (Club Mix)"	6:32
3.	"Bullet (KhoMha Remix)"	6:18
4.	"Bullet (KhoMha Radio Edit)"	3:36
5.	"Bullet (Mischa Daniels Remix)"	6:03
6.	"Bullet (Mischa Daniels Radio Edit)"	4:13

Bullet (Part 2)
No.	Title	Length
1.	"Bullet (Dirt Cheap Remix)"	6:07
2.	"Bullet (Sven Kirchhof Remix)"	6:52
3.	"Bullet (Falko Niestolik Arena Mix)"	6:20
4.	"Bullet (Falko Niestolik Arena Radio Edit)"	4:01
