= Drowning (Armin van Buuren song) =

2011 song by Armin van Buuren

Single by Armin van Buuren featuring Laura V

from the album Mirage
- Released: 25 February 2011
- Studio: Armada Studios, Amsterdam
- Genre: Progressive trance (original version); Progressive house (Avicii Remix)
- Length: 2:38 (radio edit); 6:59 (club mix); 3:24 (Avicii radio edit); 7:52 (Avicii remix)
- Label: Armind; Armada; Ultra
- Songwriters: Armin van Buuren; Benno de Goeij; Miriam Nervo; Olivia Nervo
- Producers: Armin van Buuren; Benno de Goeij

Armin van Buuren singles chronology
"This Light Between Us" (2010)	"Drowning" (2011)	"Feels So Good" (2011)

Laura V singles chronology
"People Hold On" (2008)	"Drowning" (2011)	"One Perfect Day" (2013)

Alternative cover
- French cover

"Drowning" is a song by Dutch disc jockey and producer Armin van Buuren. It features vocals from English singer and songwriter Laura V. It was released on 25 February in the Netherlands by Armind as the fourth single from van Buuren's fourth studio album, Mirage. Swedish disc jockey and producer Avicii made a remix of this song which was more popular.

== Review ==
According to Dylan Smith from webmedia EDM House Network, the Avicii remix of the song "was nothing short of magnificent, with Avicii putting his signature piano progressive house style onto the single and taking it to the next level".

== Music video ==
A music video to accompany the track was released to Armada Music's YouTube channel on 30 March 2011. This video was released a second time for the Avicii remix on 8 April 2011. Both videos were directed by Jelle Posthuma.

== Track listing ==
Netherlands - Digital download / 12" - Armind (ARMD1089)

1. "Drowning" (club mix) – 3:17
2. "Drowning" (Avicii remix) – 7:52
3. "Drowning" (Myon & Shane 54 classic mix) - 7:32

United States - Digital download / CD - Ultra (UL2762)

1. "Drowning" (radio edit) – 2:38
2. "Drowning" (club mix) – 6:59
3. "Drowning" (Avicii radio edit) – 3:24
4. "Drowning" (Avicii remix) – 7:52
5. "Drowning" (Myon & Shane 54 classic mix) - 7:32

== Charts ==
Chart (2011)	Peak position
Netherlands (Dutch Top 40)	31
Netherlands (Single Top 100)	41
Poland Dance (ZPAV)	39
US Dance Airplay (Billboard)	18
