= Fiora (musician) =

- Born: 21 June 1979 (age 46)
- Origin: Launceston, Tasmania, Australia
- Genres: Pop, alternative, electronica, classical
- Occupations: Musician, singer-songwriter, record producer, composer
- Instruments: Vocals, violin
- Years active: 2001–present
- Label: Universal Music Publishing Group
- Website: fioramusic.com

Fiora Cutler (also known as Amy Cutler; born 21 June 1979), better known mononymously as Fiora, is an Australian musician, singer-songwriter, record producer, and composer born in Launceston, Tasmania, and based in Los Angeles, California.

== Education ==
Classically trained in singing and violin, Fiora won a scholarship to the Queensland Conservatorium Griffith University, completing a bachelor's degree in music performance with Professor Janet Delpratt, graduating in 2001.

== Early career ==
Fiora made her professional debut in opera with Opera Queensland, and as a soloist with orchestra performing Handel's Messiah with the Queensland Orchestra in 2001. With a preference for chamber works and lieder, she performed most often in recital with her longtime friend, pianist and composer Paul Hankinson. Increasingly frustrated with the world of classical music, Fiora began writing her own music in 2002. Together with Hankinson, she began setting the texts of the Australian poet Judith Wright. In 2003, the pair released the classical album Art Songs, which included an original setting of "The Watcher".

Fiora slowly turned her attention to writing music. After working on various soundtracks for TV and documentary films, she began moving into songwriting and dance music.

== Songwriting and singing ==
Whilst living in London in 2006, Fiora co-wrote the song "Broken Pieces" with Guy Sigsworth and Eicca Toppinen for the band Apocalyptica (see 7th Symphony (album)) During this period she also wrote the strings for Alanis Morissette's release Flavors of Entanglement.

In 2009, Fiora travelled to Berlin to work with Paul Hankinson as finalists in the international song competition Das Lied. Following the competition and the coinciding success of a dance topline she had written and performed in 2007, "Show me a Reason", Fiora began collaborating with producers in Europe leading to her working on various releases for other pop and dance artists.

In 2013, Fiora collaborated with Dutch DJ and record producer Armin van Buuren on the track, "Waiting for the Night", which was the first single released from van Buuren's fifth studio album, Intense and subsequently became a featured performer in his Armin Only world tour. Fiora had previously worked with van Buuren on "Breathe In Deep", a track taken off of his fourth album, Mirage, in 2010. In 2018, they collaborated again under van Buuren's Rising Star alias on "Just As You Are", which was featured on his A State Of Trance 2018 compilation.

== Orchestral writing ==
Whilst living in Tasmania in 2005, Fiora wrote the beginnings of what would be her first major orchestral project Flyphoenixx, which was recorded in the Federation Concert Hall in Hobart in June 2005 with the first session conducted by Guy Noble. After putting the project on hold for a number of years, Fiora came back to the project in 2009, recording new works she conducted herself and releasing Flyphoenixx in 2011.
