= Christian Burns =

English singer

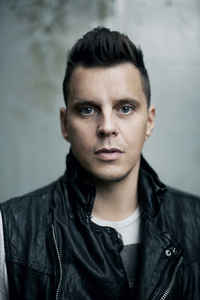

Background information
- Born: Christian Anthony Burns; 18 January 1974 (age 52); Liverpool, England
- Genres: Pop; pop rock; trance; house; alternative rock
- Occupations: Singer; songwriter
- Years active: 1994–present
- Website: christianburns.com

Christian Anthony Burns (born 18 January 1974) is an English singer. He is the son of Tony Burns of the Signs, a Liverpool-based rock band signed to Decca Records in the 1960s.

== Career ==
Burns was a member of the popular British band BBMak, along with Mark Barry and Stephen McNally. The group sold nearly three million albums worldwide and had a top 5 single with "Back Here", in the UK. In the United States, "Back Here" reached No. 13 on the Hot 100 and received heavy video play on MTV and TRL.

In 2003, the band broke up, and all the members went on to pursue solo careers. Since then Burns has been collaborating with other artists and dance projects. In 2007, he worked with Tiësto on the track "In the Dark", for the album Elements of Life. He collaborated with Tiësto again on the track entitled "Power of You", where Tiësto used the alias Allure.

He has also collaborated with Benny Benassi, on the song "Love and Motion", and American singer Jes Brieden on the song "As We Collide".

He is featured heavily on electronic musician BT's 2010 album These Hopeful Machines, co-writing the songs "Suddenly", "The Emergency", and "Forget Me". He provides lead vocals on "Suddenly" and backing vocals on "The Emergency" and "Forget Me".

He also collaborated with Richard Durand on "Night & Day", and with Armin van Buuren on "This Light Between Us", taken from his album Mirage. Other collaborations include tracks by Matt Darey, Sebastian Ingrosso, and Dirty South.

Burns's debut solo album is called Simple Modern Answers and was released on 25 October 2013.

In 2012, Burns began a collaboration with BT on a single entitled "All Hail the Silence," eventually leading to a full studio album initially set for release in the late summer or fall of 2012, but was postponed until after both are done with their solo albums. "All Hail the Silence" and the subsequent album are notable in that they were created using analog synthesizers without the aid of a computer. On 21 July 2014, Transeau and Burns announced that their band would be touring with Erasure in the fall of 2014 for the album The Violet Flame. On 24 August 2016 the band announced that they would release a limited edition colored 12" vinyl collectible extended play entitled AHTS-001 with Shopify on 19 September 2016. On 28 September 2018, the band released their first official single, "Diamonds in the Snow", along with its accompanying music video. The band's first album, Daggers, was released on 18 January 2019.

In 2016, Burns, instrumentalist Jonathan Radford Mead and drummer Ash Soan formed a band called The Blind Love. Their first song, "Without You", was released and premiered on the episode "Coming Home Was a Mistake" on the television series The Vampire Diaries. Their next song, "Run (Where the Lights Are)", premiered on 30 November 2016 on the episode "Interference" for the television series Frequency. A third song, "Wild Horses", was released on 2 April 2018. Their first extended play was released on 14 May 2018. The second extended play was released on 13 August 2018. The band released two new singles in 2020 – "The Long Way Home" and "Surrender".

In 2018, Burns and songwriter/producer Steve Chrisanthou formed a duo called Fear The Hopeful, and released an EP called "Wait For Love".

Burns announced a solo album to be released by Black Hole Recordings in 2019. The album, titled Love Songs from Suburbia, was released on 4 June 2021. The album hit #1 on the iTunes US dance album chart shortly after release.

Burns reunited with members Barry and McNally in 2020 for a tour and a new BBMak album, Powerstation, the same year.

In March 2023, Burns and BT formed a sub-label for Black Hole Recordings, KSS3TE Recordings.

Burns collaborated with Cosmic Gate on the song Brave, which was first played at A State of Trance in March 2024.

== Discography ==
- For the Christian Burns discography with BBMak, see BBMak discography.
- For the Christian Burns discography with All Hail the Silence, see All Hail the Silence discography.

=== Albums ===
==== Solo ====
- Simple Modern Answers (2013)
- Love Songs from Suburbia (2021)
- Evolution EP (2025)
- Waking Up in a Northern Town (2026)

=== Singles ===
As lead artist

Year	Song	Chart Positions	Album
Year	Song	UK	Album
2012	"Bullet" (Christian Burns and Stefan Dabruck)	—	Simple Modern Answers
2012	"As We Collide" (Christian Burns, Paul Oakenfold and Jes)	—	Simple Modern Answers
2013	"Perfectly" (Christian Burns with Maison & Dragen)	—	Simple Modern Answers
2013	"One Thousand Suns" (Christian Burns with Chicane and Ferry Corsten)	—	Simple Modern Answers
2013	"We Are Tonight" (Christian Burns and Paul van Dyk)	—	Simple Modern Answers
2014	"Frozen Heart (Big Room Mix)" (Christian Burns and Marco V)	—	Simple Modern Answers
2016	"Bright Enough to See You"	—	Non-album singles
2018	"You're Not Alone"	—	Non-album singles
2019	"Fire + Ice"	—	Non-album singles
2020	"The Magic"	—	Love Songs from Suburbia
2020	"Truth"	—	Love Songs from Suburbia
2020	"Alive"	—	Love Songs from Suburbia
2021	"Tigers"	—	Love Songs from Suburbia
2021	"Any Love"	—	Love Songs from Suburbia
2021	"Honour"	—	Love Songs from Suburbia
2021	"Now or Never" (Christian Burns and M.O.S.)	—	Love Songs from Suburbia
2022	"Almost Home" (Richard Durand and Christian Burns)	—	Non-album singles
2026	"Fall to You" (with Pretty Pink)	—	Waking Up in a Northern Town
2026	"Darker Days"	—	Waking Up in a Northern Town
2026	"Let Me Love You" (with Mark Novas)	—	Waking Up in a Northern Town
2026	"I Will Follow" (with Little Foot)	—	Waking Up in a Northern Town
2026	"Strangers"	—	Waking Up in a Northern Town
2026	"The Two of Us" (with Paul Thomas)	—	Waking Up in a Northern Town
2026	"Embers" (with Banaati)	—	Waking Up in a Northern Town
"—" denotes a recording that did not chart or was not released.

As featured artist

Date	Song	Chart Positions	Album
Date	Song	UK	Album
16 April 2007	"In the Dark" (Tiësto featuring Christian Burns)	133	Elements of Life
29 September 2008	"Something About You" (Inhaler featuring Christian Burns)	—	Non-album single
22 November 2008	"Power of You" (Allure featuring Christian Burns)	—	In Search of Sunrise 7: Asia
12 January 2010	"Suddenly" (BT featuring Christian Burns)	—	These Hopeful Machines
2 August 2010	"Night & Day" (Richard Durand featuring Christian Burns)	—	Wide Awake
14 June 2010	"Forget Me" (BT featuring Christian Burns)	—	These Hopeful Machines
28 September 2010	"The Emergency" (BT featuring Christian Burns)	—	These Hopeful Machines
12 November 2010	"This Light Between Us" (Armin van Buuren featuring Christian Burns)	—	Mirage, Simple Modern Answers
28 February 2011	"Tokyo Cries" (Glenn Morrison featuring Christian Burns)	—	Non-album single
12 September 2011	"On the Wire" (Allure featuring Christian Burns)	—	Kiss from the Past
13 March 2012	"Silver Splits the Blue" (Manufactured Superstars & Jeziel Quintela featuring Christian Burns)	—	Non-album single
26 May 2014	"Still In Love" (Bobina featuring Christian Burns)	—	Uplifting
11 August 2014	"Paralyzed" (BT and Tritonal featuring Christian Burns)	—	Non-album singles
15 September 2014	"We Are the Ones" (Twoloud featuring Christian Burns)	—	Non-album singles
23 February 2015	"Miracles" (Andrew Rayel featuring Christian Burns)	—	Find Your Harmony
23 February 2015	"In the Dark (Remixes)" (Tiësto featuring Christian Burns)	—	Non-album singles
17 July 2015	"Who I Am" (Benny Benassi and Marc Benjamin featuring Christian Burns)	—	Non-album singles
7 August 2015	"Where the Lights Are" (Arston featuring Christian Burns)	—	Non-album singles
7 September 2015	"Skin & Bones" (Swanky Tunes featuring Christian Burns)	—	Non-album singles
25 August 2016	"Brightheart" (Giuseppe Ottaviani & Christian Burns)	—	Non-album singles
6 October 2016	"All I See Is You" (Omnia featuring Christian Burns)	—	Non-album singles
16 December 2016	"One More Time" (Alexander Popov & Christian Burns)	—	Non-album singles
28 July 2017	"One More Time (Remixes)" (Alexander Popov & Christian Burns)	—	Non-album singles
1 September 2017	"Planet Earth" (Yan Space featuring Christian Burns)	—	Non-album singles
6 October 2017	"In the Dark (First State Remix)" (Tiësto featuring Christian Burns)	—	Non-album singles
18 February 2019	"Supersonic" (Swanky Tunes featuring Christian Burns)	—	Non-album singles
18 October 2019	"Dancing In The Dark" (Roman Messer & Twin View featuring Christian Burns)	—	Non-album singles
24 September 2020	"Wait for You" (Markus Schulz featuring Christian Burns)	—	Escape
28 January 2022	"Always" (Ben Nicky and Greg Downey featuring Christian Burns)	—	Non-album singles
15 July 2022	"But Not Tonight" (Paul van Dyk featuring Christian Burns)	—	Non-album singles
9 September 2022	"Closer" (Giuseppe Ottaviani featuring Christian Burns)	—	Non-album singles
4 November 2022	"Anywhere With You" (Alex Kunnari & AK feat. Christian Burns)	—	Non-album singles
2 December 2022	"Lost + Found" (Pretty Pink feat. Christian Burns)	—	Non-album singles
9 June 2023	"Force Field" (Lange & Christian Burns)	—	Non-album singles
4 October 2023	"Why" (M.O.S. & Christian Burns)	—	Non-album singles
29 March 2024	"Brave" (Cosmic Gate & Christian Burns)	—	Non-album singles
19 April 2024	"Lost in Chemistry" (Funkagenda & Christian Burns)	—	Non-album singles
14 June 2024	"Wonderful Life" (Yero & Christian Burns)	—	Non-album singles
12 July 2024	"Enjoy the Silence" (Paul Thomas & Christian Burns)	—	Non-album singles
21 February 2025	"You're Enough" (Ciaran McAuley & Christian Burns)	—	Non-album singles
12 December 2025	"I Will Find You" (TYLI feat. Christian Burns)	—	Non-album singles
"—" denotes a recording that did not chart or was not released.

=== Other appearances ===
Date	Song	Album
27 May 2008	"Love and Motion" (Benny Benassi featuring Christian Burns)	Rock 'n' Rave
17 June 2011	"Neon Hero" (Armin van Buuren featuring Christian Burns)	Mirage – The Remixes
7 March 2012	"Looking Glass" (All Hail the Silence – a collaboration between Christian Burns and BT)	AHTS-001
16 August 2013	"Love Divine" (BT, Stefan Dabruck and Christian Burns)	A Song Across Wires
16 June 2014	"Shimmer" (Tiësto featuring Christian Burns)	A Town Called Paradise
11 July 2014	"Only Sky" (Conjure One featuring Christian Burns)	Holoscenic
25 January 2015	"Photograph" (Chicane featuring Christian Burns)	The Sum of Its Parts
3 November 2017	"Find You" (with Ryan Farish)	Primary Colors
3 November 2017	"Safe in This Place" (with Ryan Farish)	Primary Colors
1 May 2020	"The Spark" (with Jody Wisternoff)	Nightwhisper
14 August 2020	"Red Lights" (with BT)	The Lost Art of Longing
14 August 2020	"Save Me" (with BT)	The Lost Art of Longing
11 April 2025	"But Not Tonight" (with Paul van Dyk)	The World is Ours

The Bleachworks

- 12 October 2009 – "Gravity"
- 4 March 2010 – "Breakdown" (free download)
- 9 September 2010 – "Save This City" (as Phonic Funk featuring The Bleachworks)
- 11 April 2011 – "It's Ok" (as Jason Herd featuring The Bleachworks)

Soundtracks

- 30 December 2005 – Sky High – "Everybody Wants to Rule the World"
- 21 November 2006 – Little Athens – "Tranquilized" (Inhaler featuring Christian Burns)
