= Mirage (Armin van Buuren album) =

Studio album by Armin van Buuren
- Released: 10 September 2010
- Genre: Trance
- Length: 83:23
- Labels: Armada; Ultra
- Producers: Armin van Buuren; Benno de Goeij; Olivia Nervo; Miriam Nervo; Raz Nitzan; Adrian Broekhuyse; Ferry Corsten

Armin van Buuren chronology
A State of Trance 2010 (2010)	Mirage (2010)	A State of Trance 2011 (2011)

Singles from Mirage
- 1. "Full Focus" Released: 24 June 2010; 2. "Not Giving Up on Love" Released: 20 August 2010; 3. "This Light Between Us" Released: 13 December 2010; 4. "Drowning" Released: 25 February 2011; 5. "Feels So Good" Released: 4 July 2011; 6. "Youtopia" Released: 13 December 2011; 7. "Orbion" Released: 13 February 2012

Professional ratings
Review scores
Source	Rating
AllMusic	2.5/5 stars

Mirage is the fourth studio album by Dutch DJ and record producer Armin van Buuren. It was released on 10 September 2010 by Armada Music, and was preceded by the release of the lead single, "Full Focus" on 24 June 2010. The album features collaborations with English singer Sophie Ellis-Bextor, British singer Christian Burns, Pakistani-American singer Nadia Ali, American music producer BT, Dutch music producer Ferry Corsten, and Adam Young of Owl City.

The album debuted at number 3 in the Netherlands, and at number 113 in the United Kingdom. It debuted at number 148 in the United States on the Billboard 200, while also charting on the Dance/Electronic Albums chart at number 5.

== Track listing ==
No.	Title	Writer(s)	Producer(s)	Length
1.	"Desiderium 207" (featuring Susana)	Armin van Buuren; Benno de Goeij	van Buuren; de Goeij	2:08
2.	"Mirage"	van Buuren; de Goeij	van Buuren; de Goeij	6:41
3.	"This Light Between Us" (featuring Christian Burns)	van Buuren; de Goeij; Christian Burns	van Buuren; de Goeij	5:09
4.	"Not Giving Up on Love" (vs. Sophie Ellis-Bextor)	van Buuren; de Goeij; Olivia Nervo; Miriam Nervo; Sophie Ellis-Bextor	van Buuren; de Goeij; O. Nervo^{[a]}; M. Nervo^{[a]}	2:53
5.	"I Don't Own You"	van Buuren; de Goeij	van Buuren; de Goeij	6:45
6.	"Full Focus"	van Buuren; de Goeij	van Buuren; de Goeij	4:41
7.	"Take a Moment" (featuring Winter Kills)	van Buuren; de Goeij; Josh Gabriel; Meredith Call	van Buuren; de Goeij	5:02
8.	"Feels So Good" (featuring Nadia Ali)	van Buuren; de Goeij; O. Nervo; M. Nervo	van Buuren; de Goeij; O. Nervo^{[a]}; M. Nervo^{[a]}	3:58
9.	"Virtual Friend" (featuring Sophie Hunter)	van Buuren; de Goeij; Guy Chambers	van Buuren; de Goeij	7:11
10.	"Drowning" (featuring Laura V)	van Buuren; de Goeij; O. Nervo; M. Nervo	van Buuren; de Goeij; O. Nervo^{[a]}; M. Nervo^{[a]}	2:44
11.	"Down to Love" (featuring Ana Criado)	van Buuren; de Goeij; Raz Nitzan; Adrian Broekhuyse	van Buuren; de Goeij; Nitzan^{[a]}; Broekhuyse^{[a]}	4:15
12.	"Coming Home"	van Buuren; de Goeij	van Buuren; de Goeij	6:20
13.	"These Silent Hearts" (featuring BT)	van Buuren; de Goeij; Brian Transeau; Burns	van Buuren; de Goeij	5:48
14.	"Orbion"	van Buuren; de Goeij	van Buuren; de Goeij	5:17
15.	"Minack" (vs. Ferry Corsten)	van Buuren; Ferry Corsten	van Buuren; Corsten	6:43
16.	"Youtopia" (featuring Adam Young)	van Buuren; de Goeij; Adam Young	van Buuren; de Goeij	3:59
Total length:				79:34

Disc two: Limited Edition / iTunes bonus tracks
No.	Title	Writer(s)	Producer(s)	Length
17.	"Breathe in Deep" (featuring Fiora)	van Buuren; de Goeij; Fiora Cutler	van Buuren; de Goeij	6:10
18.	"Take Me Where I Wanna Go" (featuring VanVelzen)	van Buuren; de Goeij; Roel van Velzen	van Buuren; de Goeij	7:21
19.	"I Surrender" (featuring Cathy Burton)	van Buuren; de Goeij; Nitzan; Broekhuyse	van Buuren; de Goeij; Nitzan^{[a]}; Broekhuyse^{[a]}	8:06
20.	"Love Too Hard" (featuring Jessie Morgan)	van Buuren; de Goeij; Nitzan; Broekhuyse	van Buuren; de Goeij; Nitzan^{[a]}; Broekhuyse^{[a]}	7:18
21.	"Virtual Friend" (featuring Sophie) (acoustic version)	van Buuren; de Goeij; Chambers	van Buuren; de Goeij	3:55
Total length:				112:24

Disc two: deluxe edition
No.	Title	Length
1.	"Breathe in Deep" (featuring Fiora)	6:10
2.	"Take Me Where I Wanna Go" (featuring VanVelzen)	7:21
3.	"I Surrender" (featuring Cathy Burton)	8:06
4.	"Love Too Hard" (featuring Jessie Morgan)	7:18
5.	"Virtual Friend (Acoustic Mix)" (featuring Sophie)	3:55
6.	"Neon Hero" (featuring Christian Burns and Bagga Bownz)	8:21
Total length:		41:11

Disc three: deluxe edition
No.	Title	Length
1.	"Desiderium 207" (featuring Susana) (Leon Bolier Peaktime Remix)	6:50
2.	"Mirage" (Dennis Shepherd Remix)	6:22
3.	"Youtopia" (featuring Adam Young) (Michael Woods Remix)	7:29
4.	"Full Focus" (Chris Schweizer Mix)	7:46
5.	"Breathe in Deep" (featuring Fiora) (The Blizzard Remix)	7:29
6.	"Who's Watching" (featuring Nadia Ali) (Mike Shiver's Garden State Mix)	7:43
7.	"Rain" (featuring Cathy Burton) (Maor Levi Remix)	8:44
8.	"Touch Me" (as Rising Star (Sebastian Brandt Remix)	7:19
9.	"Blue Fear" (Orjan Nilsen Mix)	8:05
10.	"Use Somebody" (by Laura Jansen) (Armin van Buuren Rework)	8:20
Total length:		1:16:07

Notes

- The deluxe edition includes a DVD with music videos.
- ^{^[a]} signifies a vocal producer

== Charts ==
=== Weekly charts ===
Weekly chart performance for Mirage
Chart (2010–2012)	Peak position
Australian Albums (ARIA)	53
Austrian Albums (Ö3 Austria)	53
Belgian Albums (Ultratop Flanders)	10
Belgian Albums (Ultratop Wallonia)	58
Dutch Albums (Album Top 100)	3
Dutch Combialbums (Album Top 100)	3
German Albums (Offizielle Top 100)	42
Mexican Albums (AMPROFON)	12
Polish Albums (ZPAV)	6
Russian Albums (2M)	7
UK Albums (OCC)	113
US Billboard 200	148
US Heatseekers Albums (Billboard)	5
US Independent Albums (Billboard)	31
US Top Current Album Sales (Billboard)	136
US Top Dance Albums (Billboard)	5

=== Year-end charts ===
Year-end chart performance for Mirage
Chart (2010)	Position
Dutch Albums (Album Top 100)	42

== Certifications ==
Sales certifications for Mirage
Region	Certification	Certified units/sales
Netherlands (NVPI)	Gold	25,000^{^}
Poland (ZPAV)	Gold	10,000^{*}
Russia (NFPF)	Gold	5,000^{*}
^{*} Sales figures based on certification alone.^{^} Shipments figures based on certification alone.
