= List of awards and nominations received by Armin van Buuren =

Armin van Buuren awards and nominations
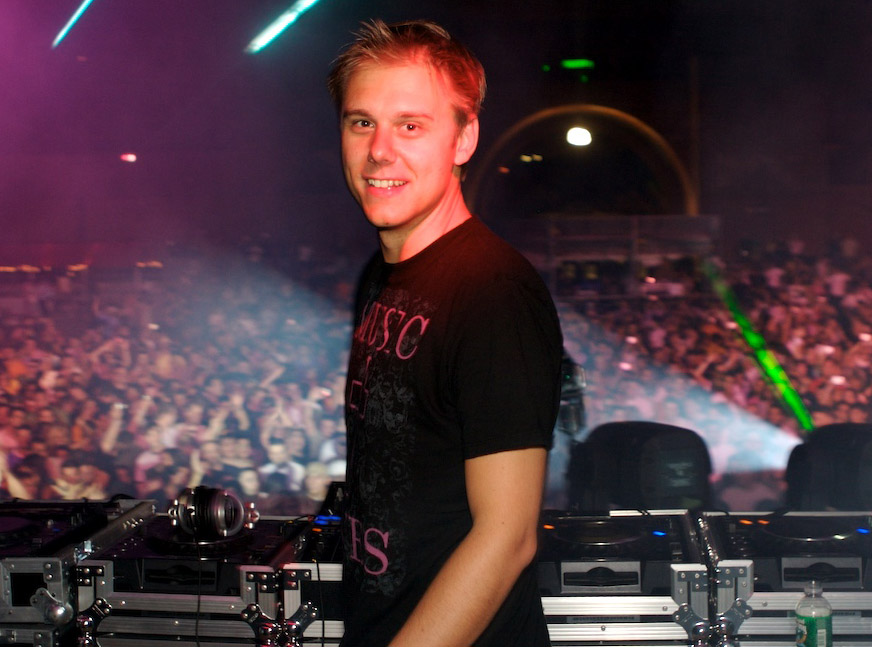
- Armin van Buuren in New York, 2007.
Awards and nominations
| Award | Wins | Nominations |
| DJ Awards | 13 | 18 |
| DJ Magazine | 5 | 15 |
| International Dance Music Awards | 27 | 57 |
| International Golden Gnome Awards | 2 | 0 |
| World Music Awards | 0 | 1 |
| Grammy Awards | 0 | 1 |

Totals (Note: Certain award groups do not simply award one winner. They acknowledge several different recipients, have runners-up, and have third place. Since this is a specific recognition and is different from losing an award, runner-up mentions are considered wins in this award tally. For simplification and to avoid errors, each award in this list has been presumed to have had a prior nomination.)
- Wins: 50
- Nominations: 91

This is the list of awards and nominations received by Armin van Buuren, whose career in electronic music both as a DJ, record producer and remixer has spanned over 20 years.

Amongst his major competitive achievements, van Buuren has won twelve DJ Awards, twenty seven International Dance Music Award's, and five DJ Mag Award's. Overall in his career, to date, he has won 50 competitive awards from 91 nominations.

== DJ Awards ==
| Year | Nominated work | Category | Result | Ref. |
|---|---|---|---|---|
| 2004 | Armin van Buuren | Best Trance DJ | Nominated | |
| 2005 | Armin van Buuren | Best Trance DJ | Nominated | |
| 2006 | Armin van Buuren | Best Trance DJ | Nominated | |
| 2007 | Armin van Buuren | Best Trance DJ | Nominated | |
| 2008 | Armin van Buuren | Best Trance DJ | Won | |
| 2009 | Armin van Buuren | Best International DJ | Won | |
| 2009 | Armin van Buuren | Best Trance DJ | Won | |
| 2010 | Armin van Buuren | Best International DJ | Nominated | |
| 2010 | Armin van Buuren | Best Trance DJ | Won | |
| 2011 | Armin van Buuren | Best International DJ | Won | |
| 2011 | Armin van Buuren | Best Trance DJ | Won | |
| 2012 | Armin van Buuren | Best International DJ | Won | |
| 2012 | Armin van Buuren | Best Trance DJ | Won | |
| 2013 | Armin van Buuren | Best International DJ | Won | |
| 2013 | Armin van Buuren | Best Trance DJ | Won | |
| 2014 | Armin van Buuren | Best International DJ | Nominated | |
| 2014 | Armin van Buuren | Best Trance DJ | Won | |
| 2015 | Armin van Buuren | Best International DJ | Nominated | |
| 2015 | Armin van Buuren | Best Trance DJ | Won | |
| 2016 | Armin van Buuren | Best International DJ | Nominated | |
| 2016 | Armin van Buuren | Best Trance DJ | Won | |
| 2017 | Armin van Buuren | Best International DJ | Nominated | |
| 2017 | Armin van Buuren | Best Trance DJ | Won | |

== DJ Magazine Top 100 DJ ==
| Year | Position | Notes | Ref. |
|---|---|---|---|
| 2001 | 27 | New Entry | |
| 2002 | 5 | Up 22 | |
| 2003 | 3 | Up 2 | |
| 2004 | 3 | No Change | |
| 2005 | 3 | No Change | |
| 2006 | 2 | Up 1 | |
| 2007 | 1 | Up 1 | |
| 2008 | 1 | No Change | |
| 2009 | 1 | No Change | |
| 2010 | 1 | No Change | |
| 2011 | 2 | Down 1 | |
| 2012 | 1 | Up 1 | |
| 2013 | 2 | Down 1 | |
| 2014 | 3 | Down 1 | |
| 2015 | 4 | Down 1 | |
| 2016 | 4 | No Change | |
| 2017 | 3 | Up 1 | |
| 2018 | 4 | Down 1 | |
| 2019 | 4 | No Change | |
| 2020 | 4 | No Change | |
| 2021 | 3 | Up 1 | |
| 2022 | 5 | Down 2 | |
| 2023 | 5 | No Change | |
| 2024 | 6 | Down 1 | |
| 2025 | 5 | Up 1 | |

== International Dance Music Awards ==
=== Pre-2016 ===
| Year | Nominated work | Category | Result | Ref. |
|---|---|---|---|---|
| 2004 | Armin van Buuren | Best European DJ | Nominated | |
| 2005 | "Burned With Desire" | Best Hi-NRG / Euro Track | Nominated | |
| 2005 | Armin van Buuren | Best European DJ | Nominated | |
| 2005 | Armin van Buuren | Best Global DJ | Nominated | |
| 2005 | Armin van Buuren (for A State of Trance) | Best Dance Radio Mix Show DJ | Won | |
| 2005 | A State of Trance 2004 (as Producer) | Best Full Length DJ Mix CD | Won | |
| 2006 | Armin van Buuren | Best European DJ | Nominated | |
| 2006 | Armin van Buuren (for A State of Trance) | Best Dance Radio Mix Show DJ | Won | |
| 2006 | A State of Trance 2005 (as Producer) | Best Full Length DJ Mix CD | Nominated | |
| 2007 | Armin van Buuren | Best Global DJ | Nominated | |
| 2007 | Armin van Buuren | Best Producer | Nominated | |
| 2007 | Armin van Buuren (for A State of Trance) | Best Radio Mix Show DJ | Won | |
| 2007 | A State of Trance 2006 (as Producer) | Best CD Compilation | Nominated | |
| 2008 | Armin van Buuren | Best European DJ | Won | |
| 2008 | Armin van Buuren | Best Global DJ | Nominated | |
| 2008 | Armin van Buuren | Best Producer | Nominated | |
| 2008 | Armin van Buuren (for A State of Trance) | Best Radio Mix Show DJ | Won | |
| 2008 | A State of Trance 2007 (as Producer) | Best CD Compilation | Nominated | |
| 2008 | Armada Music (as co-founder) | Best Global Dance Record Label | Nominated | |
| 2009 | "In and Out of Love" (featuring Sharon den Adel) | Best Progressive House/Trance Track | Won | |
| 2009 | "In and Out of Love" (featuring Sharon den Adel) | Best Music Video | Won | |
| 2009 | Armin van Buuren | Best European DJ | Won | |
| 2009 | Armin van Buuren | Best Global DJ | Nominated | |
| 2009 | Armin van Buuren (for A State of Trance) | Best Radio Mix Show DJ | Won | |
| 2009 | A State of Trance 2008 (as Producer) | Best CD Compilation | Nominated | |
| 2009 | Armada Music (as co-founder) | Best Global Dance Record Label | Won | |
| 2010 | "Broken Tonight" (featuring VanVelzen) | Best Trance Track | Nominated | |
| 2010 | Armin van Buuren | Best European DJ | Nominated | |
| 2010 | Armin van Buuren | Best Global DJ | Won | |
| 2010 | Armin van Buuren | Best Producer | Nominated | |
| 2010 | Armin van Buuren (for A State of Trance) | Best Radio Mix Show DJ | Nominated | |
| 2010 | A State of Trance 2009 (as Producer) | Best CD Compilation | Nominated | |
| 2010 | A State of Trance (as Host) | Best Podcast | Won | |
| 2010 | Armada Music (as co-founder) | Best Global Dance Record Label | Won | |
| 2010 | Armada Music (as co-founder) | Best Record Pool | Nominated | |
| 2011 | "Not Giving Up on Love" (featuring Sophie Ellis-Bextor) | Best Commercial Dance Track | Nominated | |
| 2011 | "Not Giving Up on Love" (featuring Sophie Ellis-Bextor) | Best Trance Track | Won | |
| 2011 | "Orbion" | Best Trance Track | Nominated | |
| 2011 | Armin van Buuren | Best European DJ | Won | |
| 2011 | Armin van Buuren | Best Global DJ | Won | |
| 2011 | Armin van Buuren | Best Producer | Nominated | |
| 2011 | Armin van Buuren (for A State of Trance) | Best Radio Mix Show DJ | Won | |
| 2011 | A State of Trance 2010 (as Producer) | Best Full Length DJ Mix | Won | |
| 2011 | A State of Trance (as Host) | Best Podcast | Won | |
| 2011 | Armada Music (as co-founder) | Best Global Dance Record Label | Won | |
| 2011 | Armada Music (as co-founder) | Best Record Pool | Nominated | |
| 2012 | "Feels So Good" (featuring Nadia Ali) | Best Trance Track | Won | |
| 2012 | Armin van Buuren | Best European DJ | Nominated | |
| 2012 | Armin van Buuren | Best Global DJ | Won | |
| 2012 | Armin van Buuren | Best Producer | Nominated | |
| 2012 | Armin van Buuren (for A State of Trance) | Best Radio Mix Show DJ | Won | |
| 2012 | A State of Trance 2011 (as Producer) | Best Full Length DJ Mix | Nominated | |
| 2012 | Universal Religion Chapter 5 (as Producer) | Best Full Length DJ Mix | Nominated | |
| 2012 | A State of Trance (as Host) | Best Podcast | Won | |
| 2012 | Armada Music (as co-founder) | Best Global Dance Record Label | Won | |
| 2013 | "J'ai Envie de Toi" (pres. Gaia) | Best Trance Track | Won | |
| 2013 | "Suddenly Summer" (feat. Ana Criado) | Best Trance Track | Nominated | |
| 2013 | Armin van Buuren | Best European DJ | Nominated | |
| 2013 | Armin van Buuren | Best Global DJ | Won | |
| 2013 | Armin van Buuren | Best Artist (solo) | Nominated | |
| 2013 | Armin van Buuren | Best Producer | Won | |
| 2013 | Armin van Buuren (for A State of Trance) | Best Radio Mix Show DJ | Won | |
| 2013 | A State of Trance 2012 (as Producer) | Best Full Length DJ Mix | Nominated | |
| 2013 | A State of Trance (as Host) | Best Podcast | Won | |
| 2013 | Armada Music (as co-founder) | Best Global Dance Record Label | Won | |
| 2014 | "This Is What It Feels Like" (featuring Trevor Guthrie) | Best Trance Track | Won | |
| 2014 | A State of Trance 2013 | Best Compilation or Full Length DJ Mix | Won | |
| 2014 | Armin van Buuren | Best Global DJ | Nominated | |
| 2014 | Armin van Buuren | Best Trance DJ | Won | |
| 2014 | A State of Trance | Best Podcast or Radio Show | Won | |
| 2014 | Armin van Buuren | Best Solo Artist | Won | |
| 2014 | "This Is What It Feels Like" (featuring Trevor Guthrie) | Best Music Video | Won | |
| 2014 | Armada Music (as co-founder) | Best Global Dance Record Label | Nominated | |
| 2015 | "Together (In a State of Trance)" | Best Trance Track | Won | |
| 2015 | "Hystereo" | Best Trance Track | Nominated | |
| 2015 | A State of Trance 2014 | Best Compilation or Full Length DJ Mix | Nominated | |
| 2015 | Armin van Buuren | Best Global DJ | Nominated | |
| 2015 | Armin van Buuren | Best Trance DJ | Won | |
| 2015 | A State of Trance | Best Podcast or Radio Show | Nominated | |
| 2015 | Armada Music (as co-founder) | Best Global Dance Record Label | Nominated | |
| 2016 | "Another You" | Best Trance Track | Won | |
| 2016 | Embrace | Best Trance Track | Nominated | |
| 2016 | Armin van Buuren | Best Global DJ | Nominated | |
| 2016 | Armin van Buuren | Best European DJ | Nominated | |
| 2016 | Armin van Buuren | Best Trance DJ | Won | |
| 2016 | A State of Trance | Best Podcast or Radio Show | Nominated | |
| 2016 | Armin van Buuren | Best Solo Artist | Nominated | |
| 2016 | Embrace | Best Full Length Studio Recording | Nominated | |
| 2016 | "Another You" | Best Music Video | Nominated | |
| 2016 | Armin van Buuren | Best Producer | Nominated | |
| 2016 | Armada Music (as co-founder) | Best Global Dance Record Label | Nominated | |

=== 2018–present ===
No award ceremony was held in 2017. In 2018 winners were chosen by the Winter Music Conference themselves. 2019 marks the first year of public voting since the Winter Music Conference's restructure.

| Year | Nominated work | Category | Result | Ref. |
|---|---|---|---|---|
| 2018 | Armin van Buuren | Best Male Artist (Mainstream) | Won | |
| 2018 | A State of Trance | Best Podcast or Radio Show | Won | |
| 2018 | A State of Trance | Best Music Event | Won | |
| 2018 | Armada Music (as co-founder) | Best Global Dance Record Label | Won | |
| 2019 | Armin van Buuren | Best Male Artist (Trance) | Won | |
| 2019 | A State of Trance | Best Podcast or Radio Show | Won | |
| 2019 | Armada Music (as co-founder) | Best Global Dance Record Label | Nominated | |
| 2020 | Armin van Buuren | Best Male Artist (Trance) | Won | |
| 2020 | A State of Trance | Best Podcast or Radio Show | Won | |
| 2020 | Armada Music (as co-founder) | Best Global Dance Record Label | Nominated | |

== International Golden Gnome Awards ==
| Year | Nominated work | Category | Result | Ref. |
|---|---|---|---|---|
| 2008 | Armin van Buuren | | Won | |
| 2010 | Armin van Buuren | Most Popular International DJ | Won | |

== Grammy Awards ==
| Year | Nominated work | Category | Result | Ref. |
|---|---|---|---|---|
| 2014 | "This Is What It Feels Like" | Best Dance Recording | Nominated | |

== NRJ Music Awards ==
| Year | Awards | Category | Recipient | Outcome | Ref |
|---|---|---|---|---|---|
| 2016 | NRJ Music Awards | Best International DJ | Armin van Buuren | Nominated | |
| 2016 | NRJ Music Awards | Best Live Performance | Armin van Buuren | Nominated | |
| 2019 | NRJ Music Awards | DJ Of The Year | Armin Van Buuren | Pending | |

== Trancepodium Global Awards ==
| Year | Nominated work | Category | Result |
|---|---|---|---|
| 2008 | A State of Trance 2008 | Best Mix Album | 1st Place |
| 2008 | A State of Trance | Best Radioshow/Podcast | 1st Place |
| 2008 | A State Of Trance 350 | Best Studiomix | 1st Place |
| 2008 | Armin Only (Utrecht) | Best Event | 1st Place |
| 2008 | Armada Music | Best Label | 1st Place |
| 2009 | "Tuvan" (as Gaia) | Best Track | 1st Place |
| 2009 | A State of Trance 2009 | Best Mix Album | 1st Place |
| 2009 | A State of Trance | Best Radioshow/Podcast | 1st Place |
| 2009 | ASOT 400 (Rotterdam) | Best Liveset | 1st Place |
| 2009 | A State Of Trance 400 (Rotterdam) | Best Event | 1st Place |
| 2009 | Armada Music | Best Label | 1st Place |
| 2010 | Armin van Buuren | Best DJ | 2nd Place |
| 2010 | Armin van Buuren | Best Producer | 4th Place |
| 2010 | "Orbion" | Best Track | 3rd Place |
| 2010 | Sophie Sugar vs. Sunlounger feat. Zara - "Lost Together" (Armin van Buuren Mashup) | Best Mashup | 1st Place |
| 2010 | Gareth Emery vs. Markus Schulz - "Not The Same Citadel" (Armin van Buuren Mashup) | Best Mashup | 2nd Place |
| 2010 | Mirage | Best Artist Album | 1st Place |
| 2010 | A State of Trance 2010 | Best Mix Album | 4th Place |
| 2010 | A State of Trance | Best Radioshow/Podcast | 1st Place |
| 2010 | Armin Only (Utrecht) - 13.11.2010 | Best Liveset | 2nd Place |
| 2010 | Armin van Buuren - A State of Trance 474 - 16.09.2010 | Best Studiomix | 3rd Place |
| 2010 | A State Of Trance 450 (New York) | Best Event | 2nd Place |
| 2010 | Armin Only: Mirage | Best Event | 3rd Place |
| 2010 | Armada Music | Best Label | 1st Place |
| 2011 | Armin van Buuren | Best DJ | 1st Place |
| 2011 | Armin van Buuren | Best Producer | 1st Place |
| 2011 | "Brute" (vs. Ferry Corsten) | Best Track | 2nd Place |
| 2011 | "Status Excessus D" (as Gaia) | Best Track | 8th Place |
| 2011 | Andain vs. Nadia Ali, Starkillers & Alex Kenji - "Promised Pressure" (Armin van Buuren Mashup) | Best Mashup | 5th Place |
| 2011 | Mirage (Deluxe Edition) | Best Artist Album | 6th Place |
| 2011 | A State of Trance 2011 | Best Mix Compilation Album | 1st Place |
| 2011 | Universal Religion Chapter 5 | Best Mix Compilation Album | 4th Place |
| 2011 | A State of Trance | Best Radioshow/Podcast/Cloudcast | 1st Place |
| 2011 | Be at Space (Ibiza) - 13.07.2011 | Best Liveset | 4th Place |
| 2011 | ASOT 500 (Buenos Aires) - 02.04.2011 | Best Liveset | 7th Place |
| 2011 | Armin van Buuren - A State of Trance 499 - 10.03.2011 | Best Studiomix | 6th Place |
| 2011 | A State of Trance 500 (Den Bosch) - 09.04.2011 | Best Event | 2nd Place |
| 2011 | A State of Trance 500 (Miami) - 27.03.2011 | Best Event | 3rd Place |
| 2011 | A State of Trance 500 (Sydney) - 16.04.2011 | Best Event | 6th Place |
| 2011 | A State of Trance 500 (Buenos Aires) - 02.04.2011 | Best Event | 7th Place |
| 2011 | A State of Trance 500 (Johannesburg) - 19.03.2011 | Best Event | 8th Place |
| 2011 | Armada Music | Best Label | 1st Place |
| 2012 | Armin van Buuren | Best DJ | 1st Place |
| 2012 | Armin van Buuren | Best Producer | 1st Place |
| 2012 | "J'ai Envie de Toi" (presents Gaia) | Best Track | 1st Place |
| 2012 | "I'll Listen" (featuring Ana Criado) | Best Track | 2nd Place |
| 2012 | Zedd featuring Matthew Koma - "Spectrum" (Armin van Buuren Remix) | Best Remix | 1st Place |
| 2012 | Ferry Corsten vs. Armin van Buuren - "Brute" (Armin's Illegal Drum Edit) | Best Remix | 8th Place |
| 2012 | Mark Burton vs. Sunlounger feat. Zara Taylor - "Try Understatement To Be Love" (Armin van Buuren Mashup) | Best Mashup | 1st Place |
| 2012 | Photographer vs. Armin van Buuren featuring Susana - "Airport Shivers" (Armin van Buuren Mashup) | Best Mashup | 2nd Place |
| 2012 | Armin van Buuren featuring Justine Suissa vs. John O'Callaghan & Giuseppe Ottaviani - "Burned With Desire vs. Ride The Wave" (Will Atkinson Remix) (Armin van Buuren Mashup) | Best Mashup | 3rd Place |
| 2012 | Universal Religion Chapter 6 | Best Mix Compilation Album | 1st Place |
| 2012 | A State of Trance 2012 | Best Mix Compilation Album | 4th Place |
| 2012 | A State of Trance | Best Radioshow/Podcast/Cloudcast | 1st Place |
| 2012 | ASOT Closing Party (Ibiza) - 24.09.2012 | Best Liveset | 7th Place |
| 2012 | Armin van Buuren - A State of Trance 578 - 13.09.2012 | Best Studiomix | 5th Place |
| 2012 | A State of Trance 581 - 04.10.2012 | Best Studiomix | 6th Place |
| 2012 | A State of Trance 550 (Den Bosch) - 31.03.2012 | Best Event | 1st Place |
| 2012 | A State of Trance 550 (Miami) - 25.03.2012 | Best Event | 9th Place |
| 2012 | Armada Music | Best Label | 1st Place |
| 2012 | Armind | Best Label | 7th Place |

=== Trancepodium DJ Top 50/100 ===
- Top 50 till 2013, Top 100 since 2014.

| Year | Result |
|---|---|
| 2010 | 1st Place |
| 2011 | 1st Place |
| 2012 | 1st Place |
| 2013 | 1st Place |
| 2014 | 2nd Place |
| 2015 | 2nd Place |
| 2016 | 2nd Place |
| 2017 | 1st Place |
| 2018 | 1st Place |
| 2019 | 2nd Place |
| 2020 | 3rd Place |

== World Music Awards ==
| Year | Nominated work | Category | Result |
|---|---|---|---|
| 2010 | Armin van Buuren | Best DJ | Nominated |

== YouTube Creator Awards ==
- Armin van Buuren
  (5.46million subscribers - March 2023)
  A State Of Trance
  (792 thousand subscribers - March 2023)

== Other awards ==
| Year | Award | Category | Nominated work | Result |
|---|---|---|---|---|
| 2007 | Buma Cultuur Pop Award | | Armin van Buuren | Won |
| 2008 | Gouden Harp Award | | Armin van Buuren | Won |
| 2014 | Outstanding Contribution Award | IMPALA Outstanding Contribution Award | Armada Music (as co-founder) | Won |
| 2015 | IMPALA Album of the Year | Album of the Year | Armin van Buuren - Embrace | Nominated |
