= Andy Blueman =

- Also known as: Andy B
- Born: Andrej Komatovič; September 4, 1982 (age 43)
- Origin: Slovenia
- Genres: Uplifting Trance, Classical music, Film music
- Years active: 2001–2010; 2013-Present
- Labels: Perceptive Recordings, Armind, Anjunabeats, A State of Trance, Abora Recordings, Nu-depth Recordings, Subculture, Enhanced Recordings, Ava Recordings
- Website: Facebook Myspace Soundcloud Discogs

Andrej Komatovič (Slovene pronunciation: [anˈdɾɛːj kɔˈmaːtɔʋitʃ]; born 4 September 1982), widely known as Andy Blueman [ˈɛːndi ˈbluːmɛn], is a Slovenian trance producer. His release Time to Rest was included in Armin van Buuren's trance compilation A State Of Trance 2008, and Everlasting (Original Mix) was included in A State Of Trance Yearmix 2009. His work Florescence (Epic Mix) was also included in A State Of Trance Yearmix 2010. Five of his tracks were voted the track of the week (Future Favorite) on A State of Trance, and two of his other tracks won Trance Around the World's weekly web vote. Eleven of his tracks were voted among the greatest 1000 tracks in the history of trance music out of over 10,000 nominees in the first-ever (2010) Trance Top 1000 poll organized by Armada Music, even though he had only ever worked on 13 trance songs released by the time of the competition.

== Music ==
Andy first discovered trance music in 1997 when he bought the album Dream Dance. Since then, his interest in trance music has grown, expanded and matured. Near the end of 2001, he started producing his own music, following his brother who had done the same the year before. Until recently, Andy was producing with a variety of tools and experimenting with different styles, such as ambient/chill out, melodic, progressive and uplifting trance.

In 2007, Perceptive Recordings had launched, and Andy's first track Nyctalopia was the first release on the label, with an extra Club Mix, and remixes by Onova and Will B. The release was a fantastic success. He decided to stay with Perceptive Recordings to release his music because they had a fair and amicable partnership. The popularity of Perceptive quickly grew with further singles including releases by Daniel Kandi and Adam Nickey.

Komatovič's uplifting trance music style includes the application of classical compositions, a genre many have called "Orchestral Uplifting" or "Uplifting Trance with Symphonic Orchestra". His first track, Nyctalopia, included a dramatic string ensemble in the breakdown, while still applying the same laws of Trance. His tracks Neverland and The World To Come both included an emotional breakdown with the use of eastern drums, and Everlasting included a piano solo.

His first E.P., Sea Tides, was released on February 23, 2009, and received hype by DJ's such as Tiësto, Ferry Corsten and Armin van Buuren. It included three original tracks: Sea Tides, Neverland and Everlasting. The E.P. also included a re-work of each of the tracks. These re-works still included all the same instruments, but both breakdown and main chorus melodies were changed.

Since the Sea Tides E.P., Komatovič has produced numerous remixes for various labels, including Armada and Anjunabeats, receiving hype from many DJ's including Above & Beyond, Armin van Buuren, Tiësto, Ferry Corsten, and others. His work has influenced the production of more orchestral trance, and more upcoming and established producers are producing their tracks with extended emotional orchestral breakdowns, including SoundLift, Arctic Moon, Nery, Aly & Fila, Ciro Visone, Aeons Of Flight, and Sara Pollino within the uplifting scene and Ralph Fritsch and Roger Shah in other trance genres. During 2010, Blueman continued to produce remixes, for Blue Soho, Subculture, Abora Recordings, AVA, and Enhanced Recordings. His fourth single Florescence was released in July 2010 as another purely solo release on Perceptive Recordings.

Many of his tracks have been widely voted as among the best in trance music. Eleven of his tracks were each voted as one of the 1,000 greatest trance tracks of all time out of over 10,000 nominees in the inaugural (2010) Trance Top 1000 poll organized by Armada Music (the largest trance label in the world). These were Afternova - Serenity (Andy Blueman Remix), Time To Rest (Daniel Kandi Bangin' Mix), Sea Tides (Original Mix), Neverland (Energetic Mix), Everlasting (Original Mix), Nyctalopia (Original Mix), Nery - Redawn (Andy Blueman Remix), The World To Come (Andy Blueman Mix), Airbase - Roots (Andy Blueman Remix), Adam Nickey - In Motion (Andy Blueman Remix), Robert Nickson - Circles (Andy Blueman Remix). By the time of the competition, only 13 trance songs Komatovič had worked on had been released; this rate of 85% is amongst the highest of any producer in the history of trance music and is a testament to Komatovič's consistent high quality.

His songs have also been voted highly by listeners of A State of Trance, which has about 15 million listeners a week: Five songs -- Time to Rest (Live Guitar by Eller van Buuren Mix), Nyctalopia (Onova remix), Time To Rest (Original Mix), Armin van Buuren pres. Gaia – Tuvan (Andy Blueman remix), and Nery – Redawn (Andy Blueman remix)—were voted the corresponding week's Future Favorite. As for Trance Around the World and its 30 million listeners, two of Andrej's other tracks -- Ferry Tayle & Static Blue - L'Acrobat (Andy Blueman Remix) and Adam Nickey - In Motion (Andy Blueman Remix)—won the TATW web vote contest.

On 29 December 2010, Komatovič announced via his personal blog that he would quit the trance scene, having lost his passion for trance music. He would instead focus on producing pieces of his favourite type of music: orchestral film-like music.

On 12 July 2013, he announced that he would come back to composing trance music. Subsequently, he released two singles on Armada Music in collaboration with Driftmoon and DSharp. The first one (Exodus) won the Future Favorite vote on A State of Trance and reached #2 on the Beatport trance singles charts. Then, in 2015, he released an artist album on Abora Recordings of older but never-heard-before trance and chillout tracks called "Andy Blueman 2002-2005: The Beginning". The album was also released on CD. Two of its tracks (Imagination and Cloudland) won the Fan Favorite vote on Ori Uplift's Uplifting Only radio show.

On 4 September 2018, he released Beyond the World We Know after a long hiatus from trance. Alongside the original, he released the Zen Mix, the Ethnic Mix, along with unmastered and extended mixes.

On 15 May 2020, he and artist Ronny K. released Away From The Sun with two mixes, the Original and Extended versions. This was a self-released track, and not on a label. The release was in response to many of his fans posting YouTube comments asking him to complete the unfinished track he had posted on 21 February 2011.

== Discography ==
=== Albums ===
- Andy Blueman - Andy Blueman 2002-2005: The Beginning (2015) [Abora Recordings]
  - Elements Of Nature (Original 2005 Mix)
  - Beat Of Our Hearts (Original 2004 Mix)
  - Reflections (Original 2004 Mix)
  - For Always (Original 2003 Mix)
  - Andy & Peter - Cydonia (Original 2004 Mix)
  - Underwater Moment (Original 2004 Mix)
  - Porque Pas (Original 2004 Mix)
  - Alien Ocean (Original 2002 Mix)
  - Cloudland (Original 2003 Mix)
  - Beyond Clouds (Original 2004 Mix)
  - Imagination (Original 2005 Mix)
  - Underwater Symphony (Original 2005 Mix)
  - Sundrop (Original 2003 Mix)

=== EPs ===
- Andy Blueman - Sea Tides EP (2009) [Perceptive Recordings]
  - Sea Tides (Original Mix)
  - Neverland (Original Mix)
  - Everlasting (Original Mix)
  - Sea Tides (Energetic Mix)
  - Neverland (Energetic Mix)
  - Everlasting (Emotional Mix)

=== Singles ===
- Andy Blueman - Nyctalopia (2007) [Perceptive Recordings]
  - Nyctalopia (Original Mix)
  - Nyctalopia (Club Mix)
  - Nyctalopia (Onova Remix)
  - Nyctalopia (Will B Remix)
- Andy Blueman - Time To Rest (2008) [Perceptive Recordings]
  - Time To Rest (Original Mix)
  - Time To Rest (Mystery Islands Remix)
  - Time To Rest (Extended Mix)
  - Time To Rest (Daniel Kandi Bangin' Mix)
- Reconceal & Andy Blueman - The World To Come (2009) [Perceptive Recordings]
  - The World To Come (Reconceal Mix)
  - The World To Come (Andy Blueman Mix)
  - The World To Come (Onova Remix)
  - The World To Come (Alex Pich Remix)
- Andy Blueman - Florescence (5 July 2010) [Perceptive Recordings]
  - Florescence (Original Mix)
  - Florescence (Intro Mix)
  - Florescence (Epic Mix)
  - Florescence (Emotional Mix)
- Driftmoon & Andy Blueman Feat. DSharp - Exodus [A State of Trance/Armada Music]
- Driftmoon & Andy Blueman Feat. DSharp - Leviticus [A State of Trance/Armada Music]
- Andy Blueman - Sea Tides (Cinematic Remake) (5 Mar 2018) [Abora Skies Recordings]
  - Sea Tides (Cinematic Remake)
  - Sea Tides (Cinematic Remake Radio Edit)
  - Sea Tides (Cinematic Remake Intro Edit)
- Andy Blueman - Beyond The World We Know (16 Nov 2018) [Abora Skies Recordings]
  - Beyond The World We Know (Original Mix)
  - Beyond The World We Know (Extended Mix)
  - Beyond The World We Know (Ethnic Mix)
  - Beyond The World We Know (Ethnic Mix) (Short Edit)
  - Beyond The World We Know (Zen Mix)
  - Beyond The World We Know (Original Mix) [Raw Mix]
  - Beyond The World We Know (Extended Mix) [Raw Mix]
  - Beyond The World We Know (Ethnic Mix) [Raw Mix]
  - Beyond The World We Know (Ethnic Mix) (Short Edit) [Raw Mix]
  - Beyond The World We Know (Zen Mix) [Raw Mix]
- Andy Blueman Meets Ronny K - Away From The Sun (15 May 2020) [Andrej Komatovič & Roland Kempny]
  - Away From The Sun (Original Mix)
  - Away From The Sun (Extended Mix)

=== Remixes ===
- Airbase - Roots (Andy Blueman Remix) (2008) [Moonrising Records]
- Robert Nickson - Circles (Andy Blueman Remix) (2009) [A State Of Trance]
- Waterspark - Lego (Andy Blueman Remix) (2009) [Nu-Depth Recordings]
- Ferry Tayle & Static Blue - L'Acrobat (Andy Blueman Remix) (2009) [Enhanced Recordings]
- Armin van Buuren pres. Gaia - Tuvan (Andy Blueman Remix) (2009) [Armind]
- Adam Nickey - In Motion (Andy Blueman Remix) (2009) [Anjunabeats]
- Nery - Redawn (Andy Blueman Remix) (February 2010) [Blue Soho Recordings]
- Afternova - Serenity (Andy Blueman Remix) (April 2010) [Abora Recordings]
- Afternova - Serenity (Andy Blueman Orchestral Remix) (April 2010) [Abora Recordings]
- Motionchild & Will Holland feat. Tiff Lacey - Arctic Kiss (Andy Blueman Remix) (May 2010) [Enhanced Recordings]
- Motionchild & Will Holland feat. Tiff Lacey - Arctic Kiss (Andy Blueman Instrumental Remix) (May 2010) [Enhanced Recordings]
- DNS Project feat. Johanna - Timestep (Andy Blueman Remix) (July 2010) [AVA Recordings]
- DNS Project feat. Johanna - Timestep (Andy Blueman Dub Mix) (July 2010) [AVA Recordings]
- Neal Scarborough - Kanya (Andy Blueman Remix) (October 2010) [Subculture]
- SoundLift - Horizonte (Andy Blueman Remix) (October 2010) [Blue Soho Recordings]
- SoundLift - Horizonte (Andy Blueman Intro Mix) (October 2010) [Blue Soho Recordings]

=== In Compilations ===
- Andrej Komatovic - Playful Spirits of the Forest [Abora Symphonic]

=== Personal life ===
Andy Blueman has been suffering from hyperacusis and tinnitus since childhood. Due to these conditions worsening, he decided to compose music only occasionally.
