= A State of Trance =

Dutch trance radio show

- A State of Trance logo
- Genre: Trance; Progressive trance; Uplifting trance; Vocal trance; Progressive house
- Running time: 2 hours
- Country of origin: Netherlands
- Home station: Digitally Imported; Radio syndication; Radio 538
- Starring: Armin van Buuren, Ruben de Ronde, Ferry Corsten
- Created by: Armin van Buuren
- Original release: 1 June 2001
- No. of episodes: 1300
- Website: A State of Trance

A State of Trance is a Dutch trance and progressive radio show and event brand founded by Armin van Buuren. The radio show first aired on 1 June 2001 and is usually broadcast weekly as a two-hour programme featuring new trance, progressive trance, uplifting trance, vocal trance and progressive house music.

The programme is hosted by van Buuren with co-host Ruben de Ronde; Ferry Corsten has also appeared as a monthly resident and presenter on the show. The brand also includes the A State of Trance record label, annual mix compilations, year-mix releases and festival events.

ASOT is broadcast as a 2-hour livestream with some stations re-airing the entire stream. However, several of its radio affiliates omit the second hour while other stations format the show into two 58-minute segments to make time for local advertising and station branding.

== Format and broadcasts ==
Armin van Buuren performing on-air

The show usually takes the form of a two-hour DJ mix. It focuses on new trance and progressive music, including commercial releases, promotional tracks and unreleased material. Regular features have included "Tune of the Week", "Future Favourite", "Service for Dreamers", "Trending Track" and "Progressive Pick".

Currently it is broadcast on websites such as DI.FM and by many radio stations around the world. It is also broadcast on YouTube, where the complete programs are officially uploaded (from episode 757 in audio and from episode 800 Part 2 in video), Twitch, Facebook, VK, and SiriusXM’s "A State of Armin" channel. Tracks from A State of Trance are also available on a number of streaming services, including Spotify, iTunes, Deezer, Tidal and Anghami. Track lists for every episode can be found in the description of each YouTube stream, 1001tracklists.com, and the Episodes page of Armin van Buuren's A State of Trance website.

Since 2017, the programme has also been broadcast as a video livestream from the A State of Trance studio in Amsterdam. From 2019 onward, guest DJs have regularly appeared during the second hour of the programme, while de Ronde or Corsten have often hosted parts of the broadcast.

== History ==
=== Background and growth ===
On Friday, 1 June 2001, Episode 001 was broadcast through ID&T Radio, and continued to be broadcast on a weekly basis. The first three episodes were titled Into Trance, however from Episode 004 onwards it was called A State Of Trance.

Since episode 017, the show has aired on Thursdays.

Episode 182 was the last to air on ID&T Radio, as the show was canceled unexpectedly after the station decided to change its music policy. Episode 183 was aired a month later, through the Internet radio station ETN.fm. To better adapt to an international audience, Armin went from presenting in Dutch to presenting in English.

From Episode 185 onward, the show changed from ETN.fm to DI.FM and began to synchronise across many national radio stations.

Since the 500th episode, A State of Trance's annual episodic celebrations have replaced Trance Energy (later simply called Energy, focusing on electro house instead of trance) as the main trance event in the Netherlands, where every year the biggest of these celebrations takes place.

From episode 800 Part 2, the show began to broadcast in video through YouTube from a new studio in Amsterdam. In addition, the Dutch DJ and producer Ruben de Ronde began to co-host the program with Armin van Buuren.

Starting episode 922, various DJs have been invited to mix during the second hour of the show. During this hour, the episode is usually hosted by Ruben de Ronde or Ferry Corsten, with Armin van Buuren only presenting the first hour of the show.

In episode 972, Corsten's monthly residency on the show was announced.

=== Episode 1000 and ASOT Top 1000 ===
In January 2021, A State of Trance reached its 1000th episode. The milestone was preceded by a seven-day A State of Trance Top 1000 livestream, which counted down the most popular ASOT-played records of all time as voted by listeners. The stream included year mixes, interviews, fan videos and the fan-voted countdown, and ended with the broadcast of episode 1000 from the ASOT studio in Amsterdam.

The number-one track in the fan-voted list was Armin van Buuren featuring Susana's "Shivers", followed by Tiësto's "Adagio for Strings" and Gaia's "Tuvan". A related compilation, A State of Trance 1000 – Celebration Mix, was released in 2021 and contained tracks selected by ASOT listeners from the Top 1000 project.

In September 2021, van Buuren released A State of Trance Forever, a collaborative album connected to the 1000th episode celebrations. The album included collaborations with artists associated with the history of trance, including Maor Levi, Sander van Doorn, Rank 1, Paul Oakenfold, Aly & Fila, Push, Jorn van Deynhoven, Giuseppe Ottaviani and Susana.

=== Record label (2003–present) ===
The A State of Trance record label was launched in 2003 as one of the first imprints of Armada Music. The imprint was created as an extension of Armin van Buuren's radio programme of the same name and has primarily focused on trance and progressive trance releases. Within Armada Music's label structure, A State of Trance and Armind have been described by the Independent Music Companies Association as sub-labels run directly by van Buuren.

The label's early catalogue included releases by both emerging producers and established trance artists. Its first vinyl release was Questia's "Nexus Asia", issued in June 2003 with the catalogue number ASOT001. By June 2008, the imprint had reached its 100th release with The Doppler Effect – Beauty Hides in the Deep / Envio – For You (The Blizzard Remixes).

The imprint also functions as part of the wider A State of Trance brand, alongside the weekly radio show, live events and compilation series. Armada Music lists artists such as Armin van Buuren, Ben Gold and Allen Watts among the label's associated artists, while the imprint has continued to issue singles, compilation-related releases and themed projects connected to the ASOT platform.

=== The radio show's legacy ===
While it was not the first radio show to broadcast a two-hour mix from a recurring DJ, A State of Trance's legacy has extended beyond the trance scene. Part of this may be due to the fact that, for most parts of the world, A State of Trance was only accessible via Digitally Imported (also known as DI.FM), an internet radio station. Since A State of Trance has been on the air, numerous DJs have created their own radio programs similar to A State of Trance; some of these include Above & Beyond's Group Therapy (formerly Trance Around the World), Aly & Fila's Future Sound of Egypt, Markus Schulz's Global DJ Broadcast and Andrew Rayel's Find Your Harmony.

== Special episodes and celebratory events ==
Although the program usually takes the format of a mixture of two hours in which mostly the latest musical developments are presented, special episodes are also made: broadcasts of recorded sessions, the programs in which the Tune of the Year is chosen, the Year Mix, the anniversary editions, as well as various specials.

The 100th episode was a 5-hour special show, with guest mixes and the best tunes of the 100 episodes.

The 200th episode was a 4-hour special show, with the most requested songs by listeners, a Gabriel & Dresden guest mix, and one hour of a live show from Amsterdam.

Since the 250th episode and every subsequent 50th episode of the show, there were some celebrations that include guest trance DJs playing live. Since the 400th episode, these celebrations have also taken place outside the Netherlands.

Since the 500th episode, A State of Trance's annual episodic celebrations have replaced Trance Energy (later simply called Energy, focusing on electro house instead of trance) as the main trance event in the Netherlands, where every year the biggest of these celebrations takes place.

After the celebration of the events corresponding to 1000th episode, the annual celebrations became detached from the episode numbering.

=== Rotterdam era and 25th anniversary ===
In 2024, A State of Trance moved its flagship festival to Rotterdam Ahoy under the theme Destination. The 2024 edition took place on 23 and 24 February and included a daytime programme at the official A State of Trance hotel, with sessions built around mindfulness, talent, art and knowledge. The same source described the move to Rotterdam as the first time the festival had been hosted in the city, with nearly 60 acts across two days at Ahoy.

A State of Trance marked its 25th anniversary in 2026 with a two-day Rotterdam Ahoy event on 27 and 28 February. The Friday programme included three stages and a "Journey Through 25 Years of Trance" concept, while the Saturday programme expanded to five stages covering different styles within trance and progressive music. The official festival website also listed 2026 A State of Trance events in Hong Kong, Vietnam and Poland, as well as an Ibiza residency at [UNVRS].

== Special tracks ==
Throughout a regular show, there are tracks that are chosen as Tune of the Week, Future Favourite, Service for Dreamers, Trending Track and Progressive Pick.

The Tune of the Week is selected by Armin van Buuren as his personal choice of best new tune in the show.

The Future Favorite is voted for by listeners from a list of new tunes from the previous week's show. It began in episode 090. The poll takes place at Future Favorite. It does not appear in all regular shows.

For Service for Dreamers, Armin asks the listeners of A State of Trance to submit original suggestions for a trance track that has had a meaningful impact in their lives. During episodes 248–769, when it was known as ASOT Radio Classic (and between episode 770 and 799 as Armin's Oldskool Classic), Armin selected a track from past years and briefly described what made the track a classic. Armin also played a classic track on each of the first 16 episodes in the early days of the radio show along with episodes 177-180 and episode 235. These tracks were productions from the 1990s and showcased some of the very earliest pioneers of the Trance genre.

The Trending Track is the most discussed track from last week's show. It began in episode 706. It does not appear in all regular shows.

The Progressive Pick is a featured new progressive trance track. It began in episode 717. It does not appear in all regular shows.

== Incidents ==
=== Paul van Dyk stage fall ===
On 27 February 2016, Paul van Dyk suffered a near-fatal fall during his performance at the A State of Trance 750 event in Utrecht. The main stage was closed after the accident, and van Dyk was taken to hospital with serious injuries, including damage to his spine and brain.

In 2019, van Dyk was awarded $12,588,643.45 in damages from event organizer ALDA Events. The ruling found that ALDA had not designed the stage to be safe to stand on and had not warned van Dyk that part of the stage structure was unstable. ALDA later contested the award, arguing that van Dyk was not a signatory to the underlying performance contract.

In 2018, van Dyk clarified that comments about the handling of the accident were directed at ALDA rather than the A State of Trance brand or Armin van Buuren. In 2024, he stated that he had not received the court-ordered compensation or an apology from ALDA. ALDA said the matter was being handled by its attorneys and insurance companies.

== Compilation series ==
=== A State of Trance Series ===
Armin van Buuren annually releases a triple mix (double mix for the 2022 and older entries) CD of A State of Trance compilations, as listed below:

- A State of Trance 2004
- A State of Trance 2005
- A State of Trance 2006
- A State of Trance 2007
- A State of Trance 2008
- A State of Trance 2009
- A State of Trance 2010
- A State of Trance 2011
- A State of Trance 2012
- A State of Trance 2013
- A State of Trance 2014
- A State of Trance 2015
- A State of Trance 2016
- A State of Trance 2017
- A State of Trance 2018
- A State of Trance 2019
- A State of Trance 2020
- A State of Trance 2021
- A State of Trance 2022
- A State of Trance 2023
- A State of Trance 2024
- A State of Trance 2025
- A State of Trance 2026

=== A State of Trance Year Mix Series ===
Armin van Buuren annually records so-called Year Mixes that comprises the crème de la crème of trance music from the previous year. Besides being broadcast and streamed, these are available in double mix CD format:

- A State of Trance Year Mix 2004 Mixed by Armin van Buuren (released in double CD in 2014)
- A State of Trance Year Mix 2005 Mixed by Armin van Buuren
- A State of Trance Year Mix 2006 Mixed by Armin van Buuren
- A State of Trance Year Mix 2007 Mixed by Armin van Buuren
- A State of Trance Year Mix 2008 Mixed by Armin van Buuren
- A State of Trance Year Mix 2009 Mixed by Armin van Buuren
- A State of Trance Year Mix 2010 Mixed by Armin van Buuren
- A State of Trance Year Mix 2011 Mixed by Armin van Buuren
- A State of Trance Year Mix 2012 Mixed by Armin van Buuren
- A State of Trance Year Mix 2013 Mixed by Armin van Buuren
- A State of Trance Year Mix 2014 Mixed by Armin van Buuren
- A State of Trance Year Mix 2015 Mixed by Armin van Buuren
- A State of Trance Year Mix 2016 Mixed by Armin van Buuren
- A State of Trance Year Mix 2017 Mixed by Armin van Buuren
- A State of Trance Year Mix 2018 Mixed by Armin van Buuren
- A State of Trance Year Mix 2019 Mixed by Armin van Buuren
- A State of Trance Year Mix 2020 Mixed by Armin van Buuren
- A State of Trance Year Mix 2021 Mixed by Armin van Buuren
- A State of Trance Year Mix 2022 Mixed by Armin van Buuren
- A State of Trance Year Mix 2023 Mixed by Armin van Buuren
- A State of Trance Year Mix 2024 Mixed by Armin van Buuren
- A State of Trance Year Mix 2025 Mixed by Armin van Buuren

== Awards and nominations ==
=== International Dance Music Awards ===
Year	Category	Work	Result	Ref.
2004	Best Podcast or Radio Show	A State of Trance - Armin van Buuren	Won	
2005	Best Podcast or Radio Show	A State of Trance - Armin van Buuren	Won	
2006	Best Podcast or Radio Show	A State of Trance - Armin van Buuren	Won	
2007	Best Podcast or Radio Show	A State of Trance - Armin van Buuren	Won	
2008	Best Podcast or Radio Show	A State of Trance - Armin van Buuren	Won	
2009	Best Podcast or Radio Show	A State of Trance - Armin van Buuren	Won	
2010	Best Podcast or Radio Show	A State of Trance - Armin van Buuren	Won	
2011	Best Podcast or Radio Show	A State of Trance - Armin van Buuren	Won	
2012	Best Podcast or Radio Show	A State of Trance - Armin van Buuren	Won	
2013	Best Podcast or Radio Show	A State of Trance - Armin van Buuren	Won	
2014	Best Podcast or Radio Show	A State of Trance - Armin van Buuren	Won	
2015	Best Podcast or Radio Show	A State of Trance - Armin van Buuren	Nominated	
2016	Best Podcast or Radio Show	A State of Trance - Armin van Buuren	Nominated	
2018	Best Podcast or Radio Show	A State of Trance - Armin van Buuren	Won	
2019	Best Podcast or Radio Show	A State of Trance - Armin van Buuren	Won	
2020	Best Podcast or Radio Show	A State of Trance - Armin van Buuren	Won	

== See also ==
- Corsten's Countdown, a similar show by Ferry Corsten
- Future Sound of Egypt, a similar show by Aly & Fila
- Global DJ Broadcast, a similar show by Markus Schulz
