= Universal Religion Chapter 4 =

Compilation album by Armin van Buuren
- Released: 5 October 2009
- Genres: Uplifting trance; progressive trance; progressive house
- Length: 77:47
- Label: Armada

Armin van Buuren chronology
A State of Trance 2009 (2009)	Universal Religion Chapter 4 (2009)	A State of Trance 2010 (2010)

Universal Religion Chapter 4 is the fourth compilation album in the Universal Religion compilation series mixed and compiled by Dutch DJ and record producer Armin van Buuren. It was released on 5 October 2009 by Armada Music.

The digital download version was released on 21 September 2009 on iTunes and contains edits of the individual songs listed, as well as the full continuous mix.

== Track listing ==
No.	Title	Writer(s)	Artist	Length
1.	"Every Other Way (Armin van Buuren Remix)"	BT, Jes	BT featuring Jes	7:39
2.	"This Moment (Prog Mix)"	Claus Terhoeven, Jonathan Mendelsohn	Nic Chagall featuring Jonathan Mendelsohn	5:35
3.	"Here For Me (Mark Otten Re-Dub)"	Mark Otten, Raz Nitzan, Adrian Broekhuyse	Julian Vincent featuring Cathy Burton	5:21
4.	"Perfect Sky"	Espen Gulbrandsen, Raz Nitzan, Adrian Broekhuyse	Espen Gulbrandsen vs. DJ Julian Vincent featuring Maria Nayler	5:06
5.	"Beggin' You (Armin van Buuren Remix)"	Shawn Mitiska, Matt Cerf, Jaren Cerf	Cerf, Mitiska and Jaren	7:16
6.	"Venice Beach"	Daniel Kandi	Daniel Kandi	5:02
7.	"Tuvan (Gareth Emery Remix)"	Armin van Buuren, Benno de Goeij	Gaia	6:15
8.	"Stadium Four"	Andy Moor, Lange	Lange and Andy Moor	4:44
9.	"U.R. (Stoneface and Terminal Remix)"	Activa, Chris & Matt Kidd	Activa vs. Chris & Matt Kidd	4:42
10.	"Healesville Sanctuary (Roger Shah Mix) (Armin van Buuren Edit)"	Roger P. Shah, Pascal Minnaard, Ron Hagen	Roger Shah and Signum	5:54
11.	"RAMsterdam (Jorn van Deynhoven Remix)"	Dennis Schimonik, Jorn van Deynhoven, Massimo Nocito, Sascha Milde	RAM	5:23
12.	"False Gods"	Ian Betts	Ian Betts	3:44
13.	"Somehow (Sebastian Brandt Dub Remix)"	Dennis Sheperd, Tyson Illingworth	tyDi and Dennis Sheperd featuring Marcie	5:50
14.	"Sin City (Rex Mundi Remix)"	Markus Schulz	Dakota	5:19

== Charts ==
Chart (2009)	Peak position
Dutch Albums (Album Top 100)	6
Mexican Albums (Top 100 Mexico)	39
