= Gaia (duo) =

Dutch trance band

Background information
- Origin: Netherlands
- Genres: Trance; uplifting trance
- Years active: 2000; 2009–present
- Labels: Armada; Armind
- Members: Armin van Buuren; Benno de Goeij

Gaia, stylised as GAIA, is a Dutch electronic music duo consisting of Armin van Buuren and Benno de Goeij. The project began as a solo alias of van Buuren in 2000 and later became a duo with de Goeij, with whom van Buuren had worked extensively as a producer and songwriter.

The project is known for instrumental trance and progressive electronic music, including tracks such as "Tuvan", "Aisha", "Status Excessu D", "Stellar", "Empire of Hearts" and "Saint Vitus". Gaia released its debut studio album, Moons of Jupiter, on 21 June 2019 through Armada Music.

== History ==
Gaia first appeared as an alias of Armin van Buuren with the 2000 track "4 Elements". The project later developed into a collaboration with Benno de Goeij, with the duo releasing "Tuvan" in 2009. The track became one of Gaia's best-known releases and was later voted the number-one track in the 2013 edition of the fan-voted Trance Top 1000.

The duo continued the Gaia project with a series of instrumental trance releases during the 2010s. "Aisha" was released in 2010 and was used as the official theme for SAIL Amsterdam 2010. "Status Excessu D" was released as the official A State of Trance 500 anthem in 2011. Other Gaia releases included "Stellar", "J'ai Envie de Toi", "Humming the Lights", "Empire of Hearts", "Carnation", "In Principio", "Inyathi", "Saint Vitus" and "Crossfire".

== Musical style and live performances ==
Gaia functions as a more experimental outlet for van Buuren and de Goeij. In an interview with DJ Mag, van Buuren described Gaia as purely instrumental music and contrasted it with his solo DJ sets, which often include vocal tracks and music by other artists. He also said that Gaia performances are arranged and mixed live, using only the duo's own material.

For their live shows, van Buuren and de Goeij used a computer-based performance setup rather than a conventional DJ setup. In a 2019 interview with DJ Mag, they said that the GAIA live show ran Ableton Live with Max for Live on two laptops, with one laptop acting as a backup if the other failed. The setup also included several MIDI controllers, including an APC40 and custom-built controllers, as well as two Access Virus TI synthesizers, two Arturia MatrixBrute synthesizers and a Nord Drum.

The duo explained that the live setup allowed both members to manipulate the same musical parameters while building and arranging loops in real time. They said that the system was designed so that rhythm patterns, filtering and other performance actions could also be connected to the show's lights and visuals, allowing the visual production to respond to what they were doing on stage.

Armada Music described Gaia as an alter ego that allows both producers to explore musical areas outside their other projects, and stated that the project avoids collaborations, vocal tracks and remixes. The project has been associated with trance, progressive house, techno and older electronic influences.

In October 2018, Gaia performed at Paradiso in Amsterdam during Amsterdam Dance Event. Paradiso described the act as a collaboration between van Buuren and de Goeij that connects old and new sounds in dance music. According to Dancing Astronaut, the material developed for the Paradiso live show later formed part of the foundation for Moons of Jupiter.

== Moons of Jupiter ==
Gaia released its debut studio album, Moons of Jupiter, on 21 June 2019 through Armada Music. The album contains 21 instrumental tracks and has a total length of approximately 75 minutes. Its tracks are titled after moons of Jupiter, including "Metis", "Adrastea", "Amalthea", "Thebe", "Themisto", "Leda", "Himalia", "Europa", "Ganymede", "Callisto" and "Valetudo".

According to Dancing Astronaut, van Buuren and de Goeij created the album using a deliberately limited setup based around a kick drum, bass line, six synth channels and drum sequencing, with all sounds sourced from one soft synthesizer. Van Buuren said that the album concept was inspired by his childhood fascination with space and by the idea of travelling between Jupiter's moons. Apple Music described the album as an instrumental journey between trance, progressive house and techno, while also noting influences from early electronic music.

== Legacy ==
"Tuvan" has become one of Gaia's most recognised tracks among trance listeners. In 2013, it was voted number one in the Trance Top 1000 poll. In 2021, it placed number three in the fan-voted A State of Trance Top 1000 countdown, behind Armin van Buuren featuring Susana's "Shivers" and Tiësto's "Adagio for Strings".

Several other Gaia tracks also appeared in the 2021 A State of Trance Top 1000 list, including "Empire of Hearts" at number 30, "Status Excessu D" at number 51, "J'ai Envie de Toi" at number 90, "Aisha" at number 210, "Saint Vitus" at number 245 and "Humming the Lights" at number 267.

== Discography ==
=== Studio albums ===
Title	Album details
Moons of Jupiter	Release: June 21, 2019; Label: Armada Music, Armind; Format: CD, streaming services, digital download, limited edition vinyl

=== Releases ===
Track	Release date	Writers	Length	Notes
"4 Elements"	1 April 2000	Armin van Buuren	10:00	Used as the anthem for 4 Elements at Ahoy; Later released as "Armin van Buuren - 4 Elements" on 10 Years
"Tuvan"	21 September 2009	Armin van Buuren, Benno de Goeij	8:09	Also released with an intro mix; Also released as part of A State of Trance 2009
"Aisha"	18 October 2010	Armin van Buuren, Benno De Goeij	8:20	Used as the anthem for SAIL Amsterdam; Also released as part of A State of Trance 2010
"Status Excessu D"	16 March 2011	Armin van Buuren, Benno De Goeij	9:42	Used as the anthem for A State of Trance 500; Also released as part of A State of Trance 2011
"Stellar"	17 October 2011	Armin van Buuren	7:34	Also released as part of Universal Religion Chapter 5
"J'ai Envie De Toi"	5 March 2012	Armin van Buuren, Benno De Goeij	8:37	Also released as part of A State of Trance 2012
"Humming the Lights"	3 March 2013	Armin van Buuren, Benno De Goeij	6:57	Also released as part of A State of Trance 2013
"Empire of Hearts"	10 March 2014	Armin van Buuren, Benno De Goeij, Mark Sixma	6:09	Also released as part of A State of Trance 2014
"Carnation"	13 March 2015	Armin van Buuren, Benno De Goeij, Mark Sixma	5:13	Also released as part of A State of Trance 2015
"In Principio"	20 April 2015	Armin van Buuren, Benno De Goeij	5:25	Also released as part of A State of Trance 2015
"Inyathi"	15 April 2016	Armin van Buuren, Benno De Goeij	7:22	Also released as part of A State of Trance 2016
"Saint Vitus"	3 August 2017	Armin van Buuren, Benno De Goeij	6:11	Also released as part of A State of Trance 2017
"Crossfire"	25 November 2017	Armin van Buuren, Benno De Goeij	6:22	Also released as part of A State of Trance Ibiza 2017
