= A State of Trance 2009 =

Compilation album by Armin van Buuren
- Released: 8 June 2009
- Recorded: 2009
- Genres: Uplifting trance; progressive trance; progressive house
- Label: Armada
- Producer: Armin van Buuren

Armin van Buuren chronology
A State of Trance 2008 (2008)	A State of Trance 2009 (2009)	Universal Religion Chapter 4 (2009)

Singles from A State of Trance 2009
- 1. "Tuvan" Released: 21 September 2009

Professional ratings
Review scores
Source	Rating
AllMusic	3/5 stars

A State of Trance 2009 is the sixth compilation album in the A State of Trance compilation series mixed and compiled by Dutch DJ and record producer Armin van Buuren. The two-disc album was released on 8 June 2009 by Armada Music.

== Track listing ==
Disc one: On the Beach
No.	Title	Writer(s)	Artist	Length
1.	"Never Fade Away" (Andy Duguid Mix - On the Beach Intro Edit)	John O'Callaghan; Heather Pollock; Jean-Marc Brissat	John O'Callaghan featuring Lo-Fi Sugar	6:01
2.	"Change Your Mind" (Myon & Shane 54 Remix)	Roger-Pierre Shah; Kyler England	Sunlounger featuring Kyler England	4:11
3.	"Paradise Lost"	Mark Sixma	M6	3:58
4.	"Riddels in the Sand"	Ronald Hagen; Pascal Minnaard	Ron Hagen & Pascal M.	4:18
5.	"The Fractal Universe"	Matan Zohar	Mat Zo	4:53
6.	"Iselija" (Sunn Jellie & The Blizzard Dub Remix)	Lars-Christian Nyheim; Tore Vatle Jensen	The Blizzard & Gåte	5:06
7.	"Miami Vibe" (Omnia Remix)	Peter Smit	Monogato	5:06
8.	"Deep Down"	Josh Gabriel; Meredith Call	Josh Gabriel Presents Winter Kills	6:47
9.	"Helpless" (Monster Mix)	Márió Égető; Előd Császár; Aruna Abrams	Myon & Shane 54 featuring Aruna	4:24
10.	"You Walk Away"	Tyson Illingworth; Audrey Gallagher	TyDi featuring Audrey Gallagher	5:02
11.	"Faces"	Andy Beardmore; Ashley Wallbridge; Adrian Gariba	Andy Moor & Ashley Wallbridge featuring Meighan Nealon	5:52
12.	"Nothing At All"	Boy Hagemann; Adrian Broekhuyse; Raz Nitzan	Rex Mundi featuring Susana	6:36
13.	"Shaguar"	Jerome Isma-ae	Jerome Isma-ae	5:26
14.	"Man on the Run" (Nic Chagall Remix)	Eelke Kalberg; Sebastiaan Molijn; Matt Cerf; Shawn Mitiska; Jaren Cerf	Dash Berlin, Cerf, Mitiska & Jaren	7:23
Total length:				75:03

Disc two: In the Club
No.	Title	Writer(s)	Artist	Length
1.	"Find Yourself" (Cosmic Gate Remix)	John O'Callaghan; Sarah Howells; Richard Llewellyn	John O'Callaghan featuring Sarah Howells	6:34
2.	"Inside of You" (Cosmic Gate Remix)	Fabio Carrara; Eros Ongari; Luca Antolini; Gabriele Borrachi; Oscar Cossali; Riccardo Tessini	Fabio XB & Ronnie Play featuring Gabriel Cage	5:34
3.	"Tuvan"	Armin van Buuren; Benno de Goeij	Gaia	5:41
4.	"Sivan"	Michael Tsukerman	Michael Tsukerman	5:59
5.	"Onyric" (Stoneface & Terminal Remix)	Matthias Baumann	Cressida	4:02
6.	"Freefalling"	Claudia Cazacu; Audrey Gallagher; Ben Lawton	Claudia Cazacu featuring Audrey Gallagher	4:12
7.	"Rosaires"	Aly Amr Fathalah; Fadi Wassef Naguib	Aly & Fila	5:08
8.	"Sunset Boulevard"	Alexander Mieling; Timo Kollöchter; Dennis Schimonik	Alex M.O.R.P.H. featuring Ana Criado	5:08
9.	"Addicted"	Ronald Hagen; Pascal Minnaard	Signum	4:12
10.	"Circles" (Andy Blueman Remix - Eller van Buuren Live Guitar)	Robert Nickson	Robert Nickson	6:30
11.	"Aztec"	Jules Moyce; Greg Spencer; Daniel Willis	Neptune Project	5:32
12.	"Look Ahead"	Thomas Bronzwaer	Thomas Bronzwaer	3:55
13.	"Come to Me" (ASOT 2009 Reconstruction)	Alexandru Tuduran	Phuture Sound featuring Angie	4:36
14.	"Blade Runner"	Andreas Lindell	Dreastic	4:36
15.	"Monsun"	Krzysztof Prętkiewicz	3rd Moon	5:49
Total length:				76:33

== Charts ==
Chart (2009)	Peak position
Mexican Albums (Top 100 Mexico)	19
Dutch Albums (Album Top 100)	3
Polish Albums (ZPAV)	45
US Top Dance Albums (Billboard)	17

== Certifications ==
Certifications for A State of Trance 2009
Region	Certification	Certified units/sales
Russia (NFPF)	Gold	10,000^{*}
^{*} Sales figures based on certification alone.
