= Shivers (Armin van Buuren song) =

2005 song by Armin van Buuren featuring Susana

Single by Armin van Buuren featuring Susana

from the album Shivers
- B-side: "Birth of an Angel"
- Released: 14 February 2005
- Genre: Uplifting trance
- Length: 7:33 (album version); 8:00 (Rising Star Mix); 9:22 (Birth of an Angel)
- Label: Armind; Armada Music; Nebula
- Songwriters: Armin van Buuren; Raz Nitzan; Adrian Broekhuyse
- Producer: Armin van Buuren

Armin van Buuren singles chronology
"Blue Fear 2004" (2004)	"Shivers" (2005)	"Serenity" (2005)

Music video
- "Shivers" on YouTube

"Shivers" is a song by Dutch DJ and record producer Armin van Buuren, featuring vocals from Dutch singer Susana. It was released on 14 February 2005 by Armind as a single from van Buuren's second studio album, Shivers. The original release was issued as Shivers / Birth of an Angel, with "Birth of an Angel" appearing as the B-side.

The song reached number 27 on the Dutch Single Top 100. In the United Kingdom, it was released as "Shivers / Serenity" and peaked at number 72 on the UK Singles Chart. In 2021, "Shivers" was voted number one in the all-time A State of Trance Top 1000 countdown.

== Background and composition ==
"Shivers" was written by van Buuren, Raz Nitzan and Adrian Broekhuyse. The song features vocals by Susana, who later became closely associated with vocal trance releases.

Van Buuren described the parent album Shivers as an important step into fuller songwriting, saying that working with vocalists required more attention to song structure than instrumental tracks. Apple Music described the album as a dance release that displayed van Buuren's versatility, including trance, breakbeat, deep house and other styles.

== Release ==
The first listed release of "Shivers" was the two-track Shivers / Birth of an Angel single, issued by Armind on 14 February 2005. The official track listing contained "Shivers" in its Rising Star Mix and "Birth of an Angel" in its original mix.

In the United Kingdom, the single charted as "Shivers / Serenity" through Nebula. The release peaked at number 72 on the UK Singles Chart, number 59 on the Official Physical Singles Chart and number 5 on the Official Dance Singles Chart.

== Legacy ==
In January 2021, A State of Trance held its all-time Top 1000 countdown as part of the celebration of the radio show's 1000th episode. The list was compiled from votes by the show's fan base, and "Shivers" was ranked number one. The countdown placed the song ahead of tracks such as Tiësto's "Adagio for Strings", Gaia's "Tuvan" and Delerium's "Silence" in the Tiësto remix.

== Music video ==
The official music video for "Shivers" was released through Armada Music's YouTube channel.

== Track listing ==
Digital download / 12-inch – Shivers / Birth of an Angel
No.	Title	Length
1.	"Shivers" (Rising Star Mix)	8:00
2.	"Birth of an Angel" (Original Mix)	9:22

Digital download – Shivers / Birth of an Angel
No.	Title	Length
1.	"Shivers" (Rising Star Mix)	8:00
2.	"Birth of an Angel" (Original Mix)	9:22

== Charts ==
Chart (2005)	Peak position
Netherlands (Single Top 100)	27
UK Singles (Official Charts Company)	72
