= Janeiro =

Janeiro is the Portuguese word for January. It may also refer to:

- "Janeiro", abbreviation for Rio de Janeiro or Rio de Janeiro (state)
- Janeiro Tucker, Barbadian cricketer
- "Janeiro" (song)
- Janeiro de Baixo (pt), parish in Pampilhosa da Serra
- Janeiro de Cima (pt), parish in Fundão, Portugal
- Vale de Janeiro (pt), parish in Vinhais
