= In principio =

In principio (Latin "In the beginning") may refer to:

- Genesis 1:1: In principio creavit Deus cælum et terram.
- John 1:1: In principio erat verbum.

== Music ==
- In principio, for choir and orchestra by Arvo Pärt
- In principio, chant by Hildegard von Bingen
- In principio, work for piano by Ludovico Einaudi
- In principio erat verbum, motet by Josquin Desprez
- In principio erat verbum, motet by Orlando di Lasso
- In Principio, track by Dutch trance project Gaia
