= Ruben de Ronde =

Dutch DJ, record producer and radio host

- Also known as: NRG2000
- Born: Petrus Ruben de Ronde; 16 August 1982 (age 44); Gouda, South Holland, Netherlands
- Genres: Trance; progressive trance; progressive house
- Occupations: DJ; record producer
- Years active: 2005–present
- Labels: Statement! Recordings; Armada Music; A State of Trance
- Website: rubenderonde.nl

Petrus Ruben de Ronde (born 16 August 1982) is a Dutch DJ and record producer. His music is associated with trance, progressive trance and progressive house. He is known as a co-host of the weekly radio show A State of Trance with Armin van Buuren and Ferry Corsten, and as the founder of the label Statement! Recordings.

De Ronde has released the studio albums From Sao Paulo to Sofia (2013), My Story (2017) and Different (2019), as well as the collaborative album Togetherr (2017) with Rodg. His collaborations include "Destination (A State of Trance 2024 Anthem)" with Armin van Buuren, Ferry Corsten and Rank 1, and releases with artists such as Estiva, Ferry Corsten, Rodg and Amber Revival.

== Musical career ==
=== Early career ===
De Ronde began his career in the mid-2000s and developed a style connected to trance, progressive trance and progressive house.

De Ronde began working at Armada Music as an A&R manager in 2007. His work at the label later became closely connected with music selection for A State of Trance, and in 2011 he shifted his focus toward producing the radio show.

=== Statement! Recordings ===
De Ronde founded the digital trance label Statement! Recordings in 2005. The label later operated as a division of Armada Music, releasing trance and progressive music including de Ronde's own productions and releases by other artists.

=== Albums and collaborations ===
De Ronde released his debut studio album, From Sao Paulo to Sofia, in 2013. Apple Music lists the album as a 15-track release dated 15 July 2013 and issued by Statement! under exclusive license to Armada Music. His second studio album, My Story, was released by Armada Music on 20 January 2017.

In 2017, de Ronde and Dutch producer Rodg released the collaborative album Togetherr. The album was issued through Statement! Recordings under exclusive license to Armada Music. It featured collaborations with artists including Ørjan Nilsen, Genix, Ben Gold and Estiva.

His third solo studio album, Different, was released on 28 June 2019 by Armada Music. The 14-track album included collaborations with Haliene, Roxanne Emery, Elevven, FUTURECODE, Matt Fax, Estiva and others.

In 2023, de Ronde collaborated with Armin van Buuren, Ferry Corsten and Rank 1 on "Destination", the official anthem for A State of Trance 2024. In 2025, he and Estiva launched the collaborative project EBENEZER with "ArenA", released on the A State of Trance label. In 2026, de Ronde released "River In Me" with Amber Revival through Statement! Recordings.

=== A State of Trance ===
De Ronde is a co-host of A State of Trance, the trance and progressive radio show created by Armin van Buuren. The show is hosted by van Buuren alongside de Ronde and Ferry Corsten, and is broadcast to an estimated 40 million listeners across more than 84 countries, 100 FM radio stations and global video livestreams.

De Ronde worked behind the scenes on the show from 2007 to 2017 and took on a larger on-camera role after the program expanded into video broadcasting. In 2020, he began hosting the second hour of the show every week.

=== Side projects ===
==== NRG2000 ====
In 2025, de Ronde reunited with Ferry Corsten for the NRG2000 project. Their single "New Inner Way" was released by Flashover Recordings on 21 February 2025 under catalogue number FLASH299. The track was presented as a more up-tempo follow-up to their 2021 collaboration "Bloodstream", with a title referencing a Rotterdam street historically associated with vinyl record stores. A second NRG2000 single, "Rise Up", followed through Flashover Recordings in 2025. NRG2000 also appeared on the lineup for A State of Trance Rotterdam 2026.

==== EBENEZER ====
In 2026, de Ronde and Estiva launched EBENEZER, a collaborative project focused on tech-trance and peak-time club music. The project's debut release, "ArenA", was issued by A State of Trance and introduced EBENEZER as a duo project between de Ronde and Estiva. The follow-up single "Heaven" continued the project's high-energy club direction. EBENEZER was also listed among the performers for A State of Trance Rotterdam 2026.

== Musical style ==
De Ronde's music blends trance, progressive trance and progressive house. His work has included melodic progressive productions, vocal trance tracks and DJ sets connected to A State of Trance events and broadcasts.

== Discography ==
=== Studio albums ===
- From Sao Paulo to Sofia (2013)
- My Story (2017)
- Different (2019)

=== Collaborative albums ===
- Togetherr (with Rodg) (2017)

=== Singles ===
- "Republique" (2008)
- "Superlative" (with Robert Nickson) (2010)
- "All That Matters" (with Alexandre Bergheau) (2014)
- "Era Festivus" (with Ben Gold) (2015)
- "Bloodstream" (with Ferry Corsten) (2021)
- "Destination (A State of Trance 2024 Anthem)" (with Armin van Buuren, Ferry Corsten and Rank 1) (2023)
- "Stokbrood" (with Matt Fax) (2024)
- "Rise Up!" (with Ferry Corsten, as NRG2000) (2025)
- "ArenA" (as EBENEZER, with Estiva) (2025)
- "River In Me" (with Amber Revival) (2026)
