= A State of Trance 2017 =

2017 compilation album by Armin van Buuren

Compilation album by Armin van Buuren
- Released: 21 April 2017
- Recorded: 2017
- Genre: Trance; progressive trance; progressive house
- Length: 2:08:30
- Label: Armada Music
- Producer: Armin van Buuren

Armin van Buuren chronology
A State of Trance Ibiza 2016 (2016)	A State of Trance 2017 (2017)	The Best of Armin Only (2017)

Singles from A State of Trance 2017
- 1. "I Live for That Energy (ASOT 800 Anthem)" Released: 1 December 2016; 2. "This Is a Test" / "The Train" Released: 21 April 2017

A State of Trance 2017 is the fourteenth compilation album in the A State of Trance compilation series mixed and compiled by Dutch DJ and record producer Armin van Buuren. It was released on 21 April 2017 by Armada Music. The album consists of two sets: On the Beach and In the Club.

The compilation includes tracks by artists such as Alpha 9, Gareth Emery, Standerwick, MaRLo, Andrew Rayel, Emma Hewitt, Gaia, Protoculture, Super8 & Tab and Allen Watts. It also includes two van Buuren productions, "This Is a Test" and "The Train", both of which were featured during his Armin Only: Embrace world tour.

== Track listing ==
Track listing adapted from Apple Music, Armin van Buuren's official website and Discogs.

Disc one: On the Beach
No.	Title	Artist	Length
1.	"The Night Is Ours"	Alpha 9	2:51
2.	"Yámana"	Joonas Hahmo × K-System	2:39
3.	"Summer's Gone (Yoel Lewis Remix)"	Alexandre Bergheau	2:04
4.	"Draco"	Fatum	3:33
5.	"Right Away"	Rodg	3:34
6.	"Tuviana"	Yoel Lewis	2:52
7.	"Enigma"	Omnia and DRYM	2:58
8.	"Swipe"	Eskai and SNR	3:24
9.	"The Hardest Part"	Ørjan Nilsen featuring Rykka	3:58
10.	"Saving Light"	Gareth Emery and Standerwick featuring Haliene	4:35
11.	"Just to Hear"	Denis Kenzo featuring Sveta B.	3:21
12.	"Falling Down"	MaRLo and First State	3:07
13.	"Naughts & Crosses"	Ashley Wallbridge	3:05
14.	"Lazy World 2017"	Bobina	3:07
15.	"The Descent"	Protoculture	3:50
16.	"Kaamos"	Tom Fall	3:14
17.	"Cosmo"	Super8 & Tab	4:08
18.	"World of Tomorrow"	Radion6	3:16
19.	"The Train"	Armin van Buuren	3:05
Total length:			1:02:41

Disc two: In the Club
No.	Title	Artist	Length
1.	"This Is a Test"	Armin van Buuren	3:55
2.	"My Reflection"	Andrew Rayel featuring Emma Hewitt	3:35
3.	"Trace"	Kyau & Albert	3:14
4.	"Lacrimosa"	Eximinds and Whiteout	3:34
5.	"The Theme (Radion6 Remix)"	Jurgen Vries	3:57
6.	"Eyes to Heaven"	Alexander Popov	2:48
7.	"Fallout"	Davey Asprey	3:25
8.	"Saint Vitus"	Gaia	3:30
9.	"I Live for That Energy (ASOT 800 Anthem)"	Armin van Buuren	3:17
10.	"I Need You (Standerwick Remix)"	Armin van Buuren and Garibay featuring Olaf Blackwood	3:30
11.	"Voices"	Heaven's Cry	3:10
12.	"Again (Alex M.O.R.P.H. Remix)"	Armin van Buuren presents Rising Star featuring Betsie Larkin	3:21
13.	"What You Said (MaRLo Remix)"	Bobby Neon and Nick Arbor featuring Lokka Vox	3:53
14.	"Heliopause"	Robert Nickson	3:41
15.	"No One Else"	Ultimate and Moonsouls featuring Marjan	3:23
16.	"Indian Summer"	Shinovi	3:03
17.	"Wraith"	DRYM	3:14
18.	"Sweet Release"	Scott Bond and Charlie Walker vs. Trouser Enthusiasts	3:54
19.	"Arizona"	Allen Watts	3:21
Total length:			1:05:49

== Charts ==
Chart (2017)	Peak position
Dutch Albums (Album Top 100)	1
Swiss Albums (Schweizer Hitparade)	8
UK Compilation Albums (Official Charts Company)	55
UK Dance Albums (Official Charts Company)	4

== Release history ==
Region	Date	Label	Format	Catalog	Ref.
Worldwide	21 April 2017	Armada Music	2×CD, digital download, streaming	ARMA472V	
