= A State of Trance 2008 =

Compilation album by Armin van Buuren
- Released: 29 September 2008
- Recorded: 2008
- Genres: Uplifting trance; progressive trance; progressive house
- Labels: Armada; Ultra
- Producer: Armin van Buuren

Armin van Buuren chronology
Imagine (2008)	A State of Trance 2008 (2008)	A State of Trance 2009 (2009)

A State of Trance 2008 is the fifth compilation album in the A State of Trance compilation series mixed and compiled by Dutch DJ and record producer Armin van Buuren. The 2 disc album was released on 29 September 2008 by Armada Music. It peaked at No. 5 on the Billboard Top Dance/Electronic Albums in October 2008.

== Track listing ==
- Disc one: On the Beach
1. Armin van Buuren featuring Jaren – "Unforgivable" (First State Remix) – [6:22]
2. DJ Tatana – "Spring Breeze" (Martin Roth SummerStyle Remix) – [4:53]
3. Mike Foyle – "Bittersweet Nightshade" – [3:33]
4. M6 – "Amazon Dawn" – [4:09]
5. Andy Moor – "Fake Awake" (The Blizzard Remix) – [6:09]
6. Blake Jarrell – "Punta Del Este" – [3:25]
7. Benya featuring Penny Nixon – "Serendipity" – [4:46]
8. Ohmna – "Satori Waterfalls" – [6:06]
9. Signalrunners featuring Julie Thompson – "These Shoulders" (Club Mix) – [5:36]
10. Myon and Shane 54 featuring Carrie Skipper – "Vampire" (Club Mix) – [6:46]
11. Julian Vincent featuring Cathy Burton – "Certainty" (Mark Otten Dub) – [5:18]
12. Tenishia featuring Tiff Lacey – "Burning from the Inside" (Tenishia's Burning Dub) – [5:59]
13. Mr. Sam featuring Claud9 – "Cygnes" – [5:55]
14. Lange – "Out of the Sky" (Kyau & Albert Remix) – [5:52]
- Disc two: In the Club
1. Arnej featuring Josie – "Strangers We've Become" (Intro Tech Dub) – [5:14]
2. Sunlounger featuring Zara – "Lost" (Club Mix) – [7:13]
3. Offer Nissim – "For Your Love" (Sied van Riel Remix) – [3:51]
4. Ilya Soloviev and Paul Miller – "Lover Summer" (Orjan Nilsen Remix) – [7:40]
5. Markus Schulz – "The New World" – [3:48]
6. Robert Nickson and Daniel Kandi – "Rewire" – [4:56]
7. Giuseppe Ottaviani featuring Stephen Pickup – "No More Alone" – [3:58]
8. The Thrillseekers featuring Fisher – "The Last Time" (Simon Bostock Remix) – [3:55]
9. Stoneface & Terminal – "Blueprint" (Club Mix) – [5:55]
10. DJ Shah featuring Adrina Thorpe – "Back to You" (Aly & Fila Remix) – [6:31]
11. Andy Blueman – "Time to Rest" (Live Guitar by Eller van Buuren) – [6:09]
12. Thomas Bronzwaer – "Certitude" – [3:43]
13. 8 Wonders – "The Return" – [6:02]
14. Jochen Miller – "Lost Connection" – [1:51]
15. Armin van Buuren featuring Sharon Den Adel – "In and Out of Love" (Richard Durand Remix) – [4:02]

== Charts ==
Chart (2008)	Peak position
Dutch Albums (Album Top 100)	3
Mexican Albums (Top 100 Mexico)	11
Polish Albums (ZPAV)	27
Russian Albums (2M)	6
US Billboard 200	187
US Top Dance Albums (Billboard)	5
