= A State of Trance 2010 =

Compilation album by Armin van Buuren
- Released: 2 April 2010
- Recorded: 2010
- Genre: Trance
- Labels: Armada; Avex Asia
- Producer: Armin van Buuren

Armin van Buuren chronology
Universal Religion Chapter 4 (2009)	A State of Trance 2010 (2010)	Mirage (2010)

Singles from A State of Trance 2010
- 1. "Aisha" Released: 18 October 2010

A State of Trance 2010 is the seventh compilation album in the A State of Trance compilation series mixed and compiled by Dutch DJ and record producer Armin van Buuren. It was released on 2 April 2010 by Armada Music and Avex Asia.

== Track listing ==
Disc one: On the Beach
No.	Title	Writer(s)	Artist	Length
1.	"Closer"	Evgeny Aleksandrovich Smirnov; Lars Christian Nyheim; Tore Vatle Jensen; Raz Nitzan; Adrian Broekhuyse; Susana Boomhouwer	Susana featuring Omnia and The Blizzard	5:55
2.	"Who We Are"	Luigi Lusini	Luigi Lusini	5:54
3.	"Days of Wonder"	Mark Sixma	M6	4:52
4.	"Near the End"	Matan Zohar	Mat Zo	5:25
5.	"Sincere"	Peter Smit	Monogato	4:26
6.	"Last Minute"	Ronald Hagen; Vincent Alexander Hagen	Ron Hagen and Al Exander	4:22
7.	"Savanna"	Steve Helstrip	The Thrillseekers	4:24
8.	"Lovers Lane"	Ørjan Nilsen	Ørjan Nilsen	4:51
9.	"Cut and Run"	Madis Sillamo; Emma Louise Lock	Beat Service featuring Emma Lock	5:42
10.	"Stranger to Myself" (Tenishia's Burnout Mix)	Anna Mielniczuk; Cyprian Cassar; Joven Grech	Tenishia featuring Aneym	5:35
11.	"She Moves"	Andy Moor; Carrie Skipper	Andy Moor featuring Carrie Skipper	7:20
12.	"Shades of Grey"	Ørjan Nilsen	DJ Governor	5:46
13.	"Ibiza Sunrise" (Classic Dub)	Mario Egeto; Elod Csaszar; Tomas Skyldeberg; Erik Skåpdal; Claes Funke	Myon and Shane 54 featuring Labworks	6:08
14.	"Run Till U Shine" (Cosmic Gate Remix)	Andrew Bennett; Raz Nitzan; Adrian Broekhuyse	Andrew Bennett featuring Sir Adrian	4:35
Total length:				75:15

Disc two: In the Club
No.	Title	Writer(s)	Artist	Length
1.	"Safe (Wherever You Are)" (Rank 1 Remix – AvB Intro Edit)	Aruna Adams; Mario Egeto; Elod Csaszar	Velvetine	6:44
2.	"Not Going Home" (Armin van Buuren Remix)	Maxi Jazz; Rollo; Sister Bliss	Faithless	6:25
3.	"Aisha"	Armin van Buuren; Benno de Goeij	Gaia	7:20
4.	"The Strings That Bind Us"	Arney Secerkadic	Arnej	4:49
5.	"Love" (Dub Mix)	Marcello Pacheco	Eco featuring Lira Yin	4:04
6.	"Ancient World" (Roger Shah Long Haul Flight)	Roger Shah; Ronald Hagen; Pascal Minnaard	Roger Shah; Signum	5:13
7.	"Ten Minutes to Midnight" (Original Club Mix)	Jer Martin	Jer Martin	5:26
8.	"Spirit"	Andreas Lindell	Dreastic	5:12
9.	"Trapeze" (Daniel Kandi's Emotional Remix)	Madis Sillamo; Emma Louise Lock	Ferry Tayle; Static Blue	4:14
10.	"Sun In the Winter" (Alex M.O.R.P.H. Remix)	Max Graham; Raz Nitzan; Adrian Broekhuyse	Max Graham featuring Neev Kennedy	4:54
11.	"450"	Sebastian Brandt; Ludvig Holm	Sebastian Brandt	4:47
12.	"Collider" (Jorn van Deynhoven Remix)	Thomas Bronzwaer	Thomas Bronzwaer	5:08
13.	"Ascent"	Ehren Stowers	Ehren Stowers	3:41
14.	"We Won't Forget"	Robert Nickson	Robert Nickson	4:36
15.	"Taxi"	Simon Patterson; Dave Parkinson	Simon Patterson	5:31
Total length:				78:05

== Charts ==
=== Weekly charts ===
Weekly chart performance for A State of Trance 2010
Chart (2010)	Peak position
Dutch Albums (Album Top 100)	3
Mexican Albums (Top 100 Mexico)	25
Polish Albums (ZPAV)	14
Russian Albums (2M)	1
US Top Dance Albums (Billboard)	11

=== Year-end charts ===
Year-end chart performance for A State of Trance 2010
Chart (2010)	Position
Russian Albums (2M)	11

== Certifications ==
Certifications for A State of Trance 2010
Region	Certification	Certified units/sales
Russia (NFPF)	Platinum	12,720
