= Claudia Cazacu =

Romanian DJ, record producer, and remixer

- Born: Claudia Cazacu; Târgoviște, Romania
- Origin: United Kingdom
- Genres: Minimal house, tech house, trance
- Occupations: DJ, Producer, Remixer
- Instruments: Turntable, sampler
- Years active: 1998–present
- Label: Couture
- Website: www.claudiacazacu.com

Claudia Cazacu (born 1982) is a Romanian trance and tech house DJ, record producer and remixer.

== Biography ==
She was born in Târgoviște, Romania. In 1998 she moved to London to study for a Finance and Banking degree.

Cazacu began DJing upon arriving in London. In 2007 she founded her own record label "Couture". Cazacu has worked with trance ikons such as Sied van Riel, Fabio Stein and Alex Morph.

== Discography ==
=== Singles ===
2007:

- Couture
- Cowgirl
- Scared

2008:

- International Departures
- Elite
- Contrasts (with Sied van Riel)
- 2012 EP

2009:

- Earproof
- Quatrain
- Freefalling (feat. Audrey Gallagher)
- Manequin / Size Zero
- Lekker / Nefertiti
- Glamour (vs. Vicky Devine)

2010:

- Valley of the Kings
- Quatrain 3 & 4
- Solar Flare
- Translucent
- Cafe Del Mar
- Rain
- Timelapse
- Quatrain 5

2011:

- Maison
- Lights Off (with Sied van Riel)

2012:

- Labyrinth
- Quatrain 6

2013:

- Emerge

=== Remixography ===
- The Space Brothers – "Everywhere I Go"
- Energy 52 - "Cafe Del Mar"
