= Janeiro (song) =

2000 single by Solid Sessions

Single by Solid Sessions
- B-side: "Janeiro (Harry Lemon Remix)"
- Released: 2000
- Genre: Trance
- Length: 10:51
- Label: Combined Forces
- Songwriters: Cyril Helwig, Thymen Holleman, Sander Jongerius
- Producer: Solid Sessions

"Janeiro" is a vocal trance music track produced and released in 2000 by Solid Sessions.

The song is about a girl who falls in love with a DJ on tour who visits Icaraí Beach in Niterói, Rio de Janeiro State during a chance meeting. She loses contact with him when he goes home and pines for him. She meets up with him again at a later date on the same beach, again by chance. She makes her interest known at this time and asserts her wishes to remain with him. Over the years, many fan-based interpretations were derived from the original.

The success of the track is largely attributed to the vocal remix done by Pronti and Kalmani, whose studio was next door to Solid Sessions' studio in the same building. Pronti and Kalmani liked the track the first time they heard it but they felt it could use some extra production work and wanted to write vocals for it. They asked Solid Sessions if they would like to collaborate on the track with the guarantee that they would respect the beauty of the original work and that if it was not agreed that both producers liked the remix it would not be released.

In 2002, the song's popularity grew with new remixes by DJs such as Armin van Buuren, Kyau & Albert and James Holden. The song was remixed again in 2006 by 4 Strings and San & Sebastian Moore. In 2009, the song appeared again in a new version on the album The New Daylight by Dash Berlin. Dash Berlin later released his 4AM Remix which was featured on A State Of Trance episode 455. A remix by Signum was featured on Corsten's Countdown 149.

Pronti and Kalmani's remix featured vocals by Dutch vocalist Vera Kramer.

The music video was recorded in Rio de Janeiro featuring a Brazilian and a Greek super model.

The song charted at #47 in the UK Singles Chart and at #61 in the Dutch Singles Chart.
