= The Blizzard (DJ) =

Norwegian trance music duo

- Origin: Sørreisa, Norway
- Genres: Trance; Progressive Trance
- Occupations: DJ; Record Producers; Remixers
- Instruments: Keyboards; Synthesizers; Digital Audio Workstation
- Years active: 2006 – Present
- Labels: Armada Music; Armind; Anjunabeats; A State of Trance; Future Sound of Egypt; Pure Trance Recordings; Point Zero Music
- Members: Lars-Christian Nyheim; Tore Vatle Jensen

The Blizzard are a Norwegian trance music duo consisting of DJ and record producer Lars-Christian Nyheim and composer and keyboardist Tore Vatle Jensen. Originating from Sørreisa, Norway, the duo are known for their progressive trance productions and melodic sound.

The duo gained recognition in the international trance scene following the release of their debut track, "Kalopsia", in 2007, which received support from prominent trance DJs and was released through Armind, a subsidiary of Armada Music. Their subsequent releases appeared on labels including Anjunabeats, A State of Trance, Future Sound of Egypt and Pure Trance Recordings. Their collaborations have included productions with Ukrainian producer Omnia, Yuri Kane and Daniel van Sand, as well as vocalists Julie Thompson and Jaren.

== History ==
=== 2003–2006: Background and formation ===
Tore Vatle Jensen was born in Norway in 1979. A composer and keyboardist, his musical interests included jazz, funk, hip-hop, film soundtracks, classical music and electronic music. Before forming The Blizzard, Jensen worked as an independent music producer under aliases including Tinnitus Project and Koma Supra. He also studied sound engineering at the Nordic Institute of Stage and Studio (NISS) in Oslo.

Lars-Christian Nyheim was born in Norway in 1984. He developed an interest in electronic dance music at an early age and discovered trance music in the late 1990s. He subsequently began collecting trance records and CDs, learning DJ mixing and producing his own music.

Nyheim and Jensen met through a mutual acquaintance in 2003 and discovered their shared interest in trance and electronic music. They decided to establish a musical project together in late 2005 and began producing music as The Blizzard in late 2006, after Jensen moved back to Sørreisa. In a 2008 interview with Liquid.FM, they described their sound as a blend of Progressive, Trance and House music, and cited producers such as BT, Boom Jinx, Andy Moor and Eric Prydz among their musical influences.

=== 2007–2012: Breakthrough and early career ===
The Blizzard released their debut single "Kalopsia" in 2007 through Armind, an imprint of Armada Music. The release featured the original club and intro mixes, alongside remixes by Mark Otten and Monogato.

"Kalopsia" placed fifth in the listener-voted Top 20 of 2007 on Armin van Buuren's A State of Trance, announced in episode 331. It received 2,552 points from 780 votes.

"Kalopsia" was also included on Armin van Buuren's compilation album A State of Trance Year Mix 2007, released through Armada Music on 31 December 2007, as well as on A State of Trance 2007, where it appeared as the tenth track on the first disc.

"Kalopsia" received a favourable review from Trance.nu, which awarded it four out of five stars. The reviewer described "Kalopsia" as a melodic progressive trance production, praising its structural transitions and chorus, and considering it superior to the other versions of the single. In October 2007, Armada Music selected "Kalopsia" as its Single of the Week, describing the production as a collaboration between Norwegian producers Tore Vatle Jensen and Lars-Christian Nyheim. The track also received support from DJs and producers such as Armin van Buuren, Tiesto, ATB, Gareth Emery, Sander van Doorn, Matt Darey, Andy Moor, Signum, Big Al, Cor Fijneman, Above & Beyond and Menno de Jong. It also noted that Mark Otten had produced a big-room version of the track. Armin van Buuren played the track for eleven consecutive weeks on his radio show A State of Trance.

In November 2007, The Blizzard contributed a remix of Kirsty Hawkshaw and Tenishia's single "Reasons to Forgive", released through Armind on 26 November.

In 2008, The Blizzard continued their remix work for other trance artists. Their remix of Mike Foyle's "Pandora" was released through Armind on 5 May 2008. They also remixed Doppler Effect's "Beauty Hides in the Deep" and Envio's "For You", which was released on 2 June 2008 by A State Of Trance as a double remix release.

On October 27 2008, The Blizzard remix of Andy Moor's "Fake Awake" was released through Anjunabeats.

Their remix of Armin van Buuren's "In and Out of Love", featuring Sharon den Adel, first appeared on the digital EP released on 6 August 2008, before being included on the Armind single release dated 18 September 2008. The remix was one of two commissioned for the single, alongside a version by Richard Durand, and received support from van Buuren and Ferry Corsten.

Four of their remixes were included on Armin van Buuren's compilation album A State of Trance Year Mix 2008, released by Armada Music on 31 December 2008. These were their remixes of "In and Out of Love", "Pandora", "Fake Awake" and "Beauty Hides in the Deep".

In 2009, The Blizzard collaborated with Norwegian band Gåte on "Iselilja", released through S107 Recordings on 20 July. The release featured the original vocal and dub mixes, alongside remixes by Sunn Jellie and Michael Cassette.

The Blizzard also contributed a guest mix to the 400th episode celebrations of Armin van Buuren's A State of Trance, broadcast on 18 April 2009. Their set included "Iselilja (Vocal Mix)" and a bootleg mashup produced with Robinson titled as Omnia vs. Andy Moor - Stick In Mondaydream (The Blizzard & Robinson Bootleg Mashup). A version of "Iselilja", titled the Sunn Jellie & The Blizzard Dub Mix, was subsequently included on Armin van Buuren's compilation album A State of Trance Year Mix 2009, released by Armada Music on 31 December 2009.

In 2010, The Blizzard began collaborating with Ukrainian trance producer Omnia. Their first joint release, "Metanoia", was issued through Soundpiercing on 29 March 2010.

The duo subsequently collaborated with Dutch vocalist Susana and Omnia on "Closer", released through S107 Recordings on 3 May 2010. The track served as the title song of Susana's debut album of the same name.

In a 2011 interview, Omnia discussed his collaborations with The Blizzard, noting that "Metanoia" and "Closer" had both featured among the top 20 tracks of 2010 on Armin van Buuren's radio show A State of Trance. He also explained that the producers worked together remotely, maintaining contact through the internet. Both tracks featured in the listener-voted Top 20 of 2010 on Armin van Buuren's A State of Trance, with "Closer" placing sixth and "Metanoia" sixteenth.

In 2011, The Blizzard continued working with Omnia on "My Inner Island", released through Armind on 29 August. The release also featured a remix by Russian producer Yuri Kane.The track was featured on Armin van Buuren's compilation album A State of Trance 2011, appearing as the second track on its first disc.

The Blizzard and Omnia also remixed Boom Jinx's "Phoenix from the Flames", featuring Justine Suissa. The remix was released through Anjunabeats on 6 November 2011.

The Blizzard also remixed Armin van Buuren's "Take a Moment", featuring Winter Kills, and "Breathe in Deep", featuring Fiora. Both tracks appeared in the 2011 digital release of Mirage (Deluxe Edition); "Breathe in Deep" had previously appeared on the album's 2010 release.

In 2012, The Blizzard released "Piercing the Fog" through A State of Trance on 16 April. The track was subsequently included on Armin van Buuren's compilation album A State of Trance 2012.

On 31 March 2012, The Blizzard performed at Armin van Buuren's A State of Trance 550 event at the Brabanthallen in Den Bosch, Netherlands. They appeared on the State of Red stage.

The Blizzard collaborated with Ukrainian producer Yuri Kane on "Everything About You", featuring vocalist Relyk. The track was released on 20 April 2012 through Above Recordings.

=== 2013–2018: Compilation album and subsequent releases ===
In 2013, The Blizzard teamed up with Daniel van Sand on "Made for You", featuring vocals by Julie Thompson. The track was included in its radio edit on Armin van Buuren's compilation album A State of Trance 2013, released in February, before the original club mix was released as a single through Armada Various on 15 July. A remix by Gal Abutbul was later featured on Armada Music's Trance 100 – Best of 2013 compilation in October.

In September 2013, The Blizzard released the compilation album "Best of the Blizzard" through Armada Music. Released on 27 September, the 11-track compilation featured selections from the duo's earlier discography, including "Kalopsia", "Iselilja", "My Inner Island", "Closer" and "Piercing the Fog". It also included their collaborations with vocalists Jaren and Julie Thompson, as well as remixes of tracks by Envio, Mike Foyle and Kirsty Hawkshaw. The compilation brought together several of their original productions, collaborations and remix work from their career up to that point.

The Blizzard also contributed a remix of Andy Moor's "Atmospherica", which appeared on Moor's remix album Zero Point One (The Remixes), released through Armada Digital on 23 August 2013. The extended version of the remix was subsequently included on Zero Point One (The Remixes – Extended Versions), released on 20 September 2013.

On 9 June 2014, The Blizzard and Daniel van Sand released "Teach Yourself to Fly", featuring vocals by Jaren, through Armada Various label. Its Daniel van Sand and Ascend Radio Edit was included on Armin van Buuren's A State of Trance Radio Top 30 – March / April / May 2014 compilation.

In 2017, The Blizzard released "River of Light", featuring vocals by Sarah Russell, through RazNitzanMusic. The original release, issued on 27 February, featured the Original Mix. A second release followed on 13 March, featuring the Original Mix, a Radio Edit and a Dub version, and was issued with different cover artwork. The Original Mix peaked at number 29 on Beatport's Trance (Main Floor) chart on 12 March 2017.

Marking ten years since their debut single "Kalopsia", The Blizzard released "Decade" through FSOE Parallels on 15 December 2017.

In 2018, The Blizzard continued releasing music through established trance labels. In February, they collaborated with vocalist Denise Rivera on "Love Is in the Little Things", released through RazNitzanMusic. This was followed by a remix of their 2017 single "Decade" by Matt Fax, released through FSOE Parallels on March 9 2018.

In June, the duo released "Tind" through A State of Trance, which was subsequently included on Armin van Buuren's compilation A State of Trance 2018 as the eleventh track. "Tind" peaked at #41 on Trance (Main Floor) Beatport chart in July 2018. Later that year on December 14, they released the "Luminescence EP" through FSOE Parallels. The title track charted at #80 on the Beatport Trance (Main Floor) chart.

=== 2019–2024: Later career ===
In March 2019, The Blizzard released the EP Morning View / U N I through A State of Trance. In April, they released the four-track I'mpossible EP through FSOE Parallels, featuring the tracks "I'mpossible" and "Dunes", along with their respective extended mixes. In September, they released the single "Molecular" through Pure Trance Recordings. Both Morning View / U N I and "Molecular" charted on Beatport's Trance (Main Floor) chart, reaching numbers 82 and 68, respectively.

In January 2020, The Blizzard collaborated with Somna on the single "Pegmatite", released through A State of Trance. In February, they released "Blue Hour" through Pure Trance Recordings, followed by "Entanglement" through FSOE Chill. In March, they released "Tiny Little Molecule" through the same label.

In May 2020, The Blizzard released the single "Snøfnugg" through Point Zero Music on 29 May. The two-track release featured a radio edit and an extended mix. The title is the Norwegian word for "snowflake", and the duo described the track as being inspired by childhood memories of playing in the snow.

On 10 July, they released "Sol" through the same label, also featuring radio and extended mixes. The title means "sun" in Norwegian, and the duo described the track as reflecting the arrival of spring in Northern Norway following the winter season.

In September, The Blizzard collaborated with C-Systems on "Dark Days", released through Pure Trance Recordings.

In November 2020, The Blizzard independently released two versions of "Fauré's Pavane", titled "Fauré's Pavane (2003 Short Mix)" and "Fauré's Pavane (2003 Extended Mix)", through their Bandcamp page on 19 November. The recordings were based on Gabriel Fauré's classical composition Pavane.

In February 2021, The Blizzard released the single "Obie" through Pure Trance Recordings. In March, they released the four-track EP Torden / Feather through AVA Recordings, featuring radio and extended mixes of both tracks.

On 7 May 2021, a remix of their 2017 collaboration with Sarah Russell, "River of Light", by DARVO and Andy Elliass was released through Amsterdam Trance Records.

On 21 May, they released the single "Black Ice" through Point Zero Music as a two-track release featuring a radio edit and an extended mix.

On 25 June 2021, The Blizzard released the single "Daybreak", a collaboration with Egera through Point Zero Music.

On 18 October, they released "Just Kidding", a collaboration with Axis through Pure Trance Recordings. On 17 December, they released the single "Forever" through Point Zero Music.

In January 2022, The Blizzard released "Sparkling Cascade" through Point Zero Music. The track was based on an idea developed by Tore Vatle Jensen in 2003, which the duo reworked over the preceding year. They described it as their first 138 BPM uplifting trance production after 15 years of producing music.

In February 2022, The Blizzard and Axis released their collaborative single "Still Here" on Enhanced Progressive, which featured both radio and extended versions. On 7 March 2022, The Blizzard released "Sea Shells" through Blue Soho Recordings which included the original and extended mixes of the track.

In April, The Blizzard collaborated with Ukrainian producer Stanislav Nozdrachov, known professionally as The Madison, on "Snowball". Released through Point Zero Music on 8 April, the single featured radio and extended mixes.

In May 2022, The Blizzard reunited with The Madison for their second collaboration of the year, "Sequoia". The single featured radio and extended mixes of the track.

In September, they released "Blue Hour (Atleha Sunrise Mix)" through Pure Trance Recordings. The release also included an extended mix. In October, The Blizzard collaborated with Huvagen and vocalist That Girl on "Hurts to Love You", released through Deeper Harmonies on 28 October. The single featured separate mixes by The Blizzard and Huvagen.

On 2 December, The Blizzard released "Feel Free" as a single through Point Zero Music. This was followed by "Memory of a Lifetime", released through Pure Trance Recordings on 16 December as a two-track single.

In 2023, The Blizzard released the single "Beautiful" through Point Zero Music on 6 January. On 10 February, they released "Big Blue Sky" through Point Zero Music. The two-track single included radio and extended mixes. Later that month, on 24 February, they released their interpretation of Samuel Barber's composition "Adagio for Strings" through Point Zero Music. The single contained radio and extended mixes.

On 17 March 2023, The Blizzard released "First Snow", a collaboration with Chilean producer Paul Arcane, through Deeper Harmonies. The release featured two versions of the track: The Blizzard Mix and the Paul Arcane Mix.

In an interview with EDMTunes published to coincide with the release of "First Snow", the duo discussed the origins of their collaboration and their perspectives on trance music. They explained that Lars had contacted Paul through Facebook after the duo discovered his music, particularly his track "Synergy". Paul recalled that they had begun communicating around the time of his guest mix for Group Therapy in 2018, and that he had already been a fan of The Blizzard's work. The duo subsequently sent Paul parts of an unfinished composition, which the artists developed over several months through revisions and exchanges.

The artists explained that they chose to produce two versions to explore different interpretations of the composition: a more trance-oriented mix by The Blizzard and a deeper, more organic version by Paul. The Blizzard also acknowledged Paul's significant contribution to their mix. Paul explained that he was transitioning from progressive trance towards deeper, hypnotic progressive music during the production, which influenced the decision to create two contrasting versions. Discussing the future of trance, The Blizzard described the genre as continually evolving and adapting to, as well as influencing, other styles of electronic music, citing melodic house as an example. Paul expressed reservations about defining music by genre, stating that he preferred to focus on its emotional impact on listeners.

On 23 June, The Blizzard released "Cloud Seeding" through Point Zero Music. The single was released as a standalone track and was also made available through their Bandcamp page.

In August, The Blizzard released "Kalopsia (Matt Fax Remix)" through Armind, an imprint of Armada Music, on 25 August. The remix was produced by French DJ and producer Matt Fax, who reworked the duo's 2007 track with his progressive sound. Before its official release, the remix had been played by Armin van Buuren at Ultra Music Festival 2023 in Miami. It was also included on the compilation album "A State of Trance 2023", released in May.

In September, The Blizzard released "Journey" through Point Zero Music on 8 September. The single included radio and extended mixes. The duo described the production as incorporating a groovy bassline, house-influenced drums, atmospheric soundscapes and a melodic riff, reflecting elements of progressive house and trance.

In October, The Blizzard collaborated with Pablo Arty on "DroidLove", featuring vocalist Ian Musgrove. The single was released through Point Zero Music on 13 October.

In May 2024, The Blizzard released a remix of their 2012 track "Piercing the Fog", produced in collaboration with Flaor. Titled "Piercing the Fog (Flaor & the Blizzard Remix)", it was released through A State of Trance on 3 May. The remix adopted a more minimal, deep progressive sound compared with the original, and was issued in an extended version.

Later that month, on 31 May, the duo released "Rabagast" through A State of Trance. The track had previously appeared on Armin van Buuren's compilation album A State of Trance 2023, released in May 2023, before receiving a standalone release the following year.

On November 29 2024, The Blizzard released "Whiteout" as a single through Point Zero Music. The track was originally produced in collaboration with Ukrainian DJ and producer Omnia in 2010, but remained unreleased at the time. It was later made available as a free download on SoundCloud in January 2014, credited to The Blizzard and Omnia.

=== 2025–present ===
In August 2025, The Blizzard's 2007 track "Kalopsia" was included on the compilation album A State of Trance – Classics Top 10, Vol. 6, released through A State of Trance on 5 August. The compilation featured both a mixed version and an extended mix of the track.

In November, "Made for You", originally recorded with Daniel van Sand and featuring vocalist Julie Thompson, was included on Armada Music's compilation Trance Legacy (Acapella Edition II), released on 21 November. The album featured both an acapella version and the original club mix.

== Discography ==
=== Singles and EPs ===
2007

- The Blizzard – "Kalopsia" [Armind]

2009

- The Blizzard & Gåte – "Iselilja" [S107 Recordings]

2010

- The Blizzard & Omnia – "Metanoia" [Soundpiercing]
- Susana featuring Omnia & The Blizzard – "Closer" [S107 Recordings]

2011

- The Blizzard & Omnia – "My Inner Island" [Armind]

2012

- The Blizzard – "Piercing the Fog" [A State Of Trance]
- The Blizzard & Yuri Kane Feat. Relyk – "Everything About You" [Above Recordings]

2013

- The Blizzard & Daniel van Sand Feat. Julie Thompson – "Made for You" [Armada Various]

2014

- The Blizzard & Daniel van Sand Feat. Jaren – "Teach Yourself to Fly" [Armada Various]

2017

- The Blizzard Feat. Sarah Russell – "River of Light"
- The Blizzard – "Decade" [FSOE Parallels]

2018

- The Blizzard & Denise Rivera – "Love Is in the Little Things" [RazNitzanMusic]
- The Blizzard – "Tind" [A State Of Trance]
- The Blizzard – "Luminescence EP" [FSOE Parallels]

2019

- The Blizzard – "Morning View / U N I" [A State Of Trance]
- The Blizzard - "I'mpossible EP" [FSOE Parallels]
- The Blizzard – "Molecular" [Pure Trance Recordings]

2020

- The Blizzard vs Somna – "Pegmatite" [A State Of Trance]
- The Blizzard - Entanglement [FSOE Chill]
- The Blizzard - Tiny Little Molecule [FSOE Chill]
- The Blizzard - Snøfnugg [Point Zero Music]
- The Blizzard - Sol [Point Zero Music]
- The Blizzard & C-Systems – "Dark Days" [Pure Trance Recordings]
- The Blizzard - Fauré's Pavane [Self-released]

2021

- The Blizzard - Obie [Pure Trance Recordings]
- The Blizzard - Torden / Feather [AVA Recordings]
- The Blizzard - Black Ice [Point Zero Music]
- The Blizzard & Egera - Daybreak [Point Zero Music]
- The Blizzard & Axis - Just Kidding [Pure Trance Recordings]
- The Blizzard - Forever [Point Zero Music]

2022

- The Blizzard - Sparkling Cascade [Point Zero Music]
- The Blizzard & Axis - Still Here [Enhanced Progressive]
- The Blizzard - Sea Shells [Blue Soho Recordings]
- The Blizzard & The Madison - Snowball [Point Zero Music]
- The Blizzard & The Madison - Sequoia [Point Zero Music]
- Huvagen & The Blizzard Feat. That Girl - Hurts To Love You [Deeper Harmonies]
- The Blizzard - Feel Free [Point Zero Music]
- The Blizzard - Memory Of a Lifetime [Pure Trance Recordings]

2023

- The Blizzard - Beautiful [Point Zero Music]
- The Blizzard - Big Blue Sky [Point Zero Music]
- The Blizzard - Adagio For Strings [Point Zero Music]
- The Blizzard & Paul Arcane - First Snow [Deeper Harmonies]
- The Blizzard - Cloud Seeding [Point Zero Music]
- The Blizzard - Journey [Point Zero Music]
- The Blizzard & Pablo Arty Feat. Ian Musgrove - DroidLove [Point Zero Music]

2024

- The Blizzard - Rabagast [A State Of Trance]
- The Blizzard - Whiteout [Point Zero Music]

=== Remixes ===
2007

- Kirsty Hawkshaw Meets Tenishia – "Reasons to Forgive" (The Blizzard Remix) [Armind]

2008

- Mike Foyle – "Pandora" (The Blizzard Remix) [Armind]
- The Doppler Effect – "Beauty Hides in the Deep" (The Blizzard Remix) [A State of Trance]
- Envio – "For You" (The Blizzard Remix) [A State of Trance]
- Andy Moor – "Fake Awake" (The Blizzard Remix) [Anjunabeats]
- Armin van Buuren featuring Sharon den Adel – "In and Out of Love" (The Blizzard Remix) [Armind]

2011

- Boom Jinx featuring Justine Suissa – "Phoenix from the Flames" (Omnia & The Blizzard Remix) [Anjunabeats]
- Armin van Buuren Feat. Winter Kills – "Take a Moment" (The Blizzard Remix) [Armada Music]
- Armin van Buuren featuring Fiora – "Breathe in Deep" (The Blizzard Remix) [Armada Music]

2013

- Andy Moor – "Atmospherica" (The Blizzard Remix) [Armada Music]

== See also ==
- Boom Jinx
- Ørjan Nilsen
- Andy Moor
- Above & Beyond
- Eric Prydz
- BT
- Norwegian electronic music
