= Signum (musical group) =

Dutch trance group

- Origin: Zoetermeer, South Holland, Netherlands
- Genre: Trance
- Labels: Tidy Trax, A State of Trance, ID&T
- Members: Ronald Hagen
- Past members: Pascal Minnaard

Signum is the name for two Dutch producers, Pascal Minnaard (Dutch pronunciation: [pɑsˈkɑl mɪˈnaːrt]) and Ronald Hagen (Dutch pronunciation: [ˈroːnɑlt ˈɦaːɣə(n)]), who create and remix mainly trance music. Since 2007, Signum has been Hagen's solo project.

== Career ==
Originally they both lived in Zoetermeer, a city in the Netherlands. In 2008, Minnaard moved to Norway with his fiancé, and by 2009 Hagen had taken sole responsibility for the group. Their first notable mainstream success was in 1997 with "What Ya Got 4 Me" (based on Tony de Vit's "The Dawn"), becoming a club anthem. This song was re-released in 2001 and entered the Top 40 of the UK Singles Chart.

Signum started out on the BPM dance label, and stayed with them until 2003 when the label was disbanded, they then signed a contract with Armada Music soon after.

With their success of "What Ya Got 4 Me", they continued to remix tracks and produce material including; "Forever", "Better Off Alone", "Take U There" and "On Stream". Their next achievement came when they collaborated with the British producer / DJ Scott Mac, to create "Coming On Strong". After this, they went to do remixes for ATB and Alice DeeJay.

With a large amount of remixes undertaken, they decided to start creating and performing their own material. Their DJ debut was in July 2001 at Gatecrasher in the UK, and they went on to play at various dance venues including 'Godskitchen', 'Gatecrasher', 'Passion' and 'Slinky'. They also played at several music festivals that year. Since their debut, that have played in the countries including Australia, Spain, Japan, Ibiza, Canada and Malaysia.

They were signed to Armada Music in the summer of 2003, and released their first single "Push Through" on the "A State of Trance" imprint. In 2004 Signum teamed up with female vocalist Anita Kelsey, and created "Come Around Again", another success, as well as being dubbed by Signum as "the track they've always wanted to make". 2005 saw a tour in Australia and New Zealand.

Signum also produce music under another alias 'D-Factor'. In 2008 Signum featured in the Top 100 in the DJ magazine's awards, finishing at #72 on the list.

Signum's latest album For You was released on 3 December 2010 by Armada Music.

== Discography ==
=== Albums ===
- 2010 For You [Armada]

=== Singles ===
- 1997 'Adaptor' [Jinx Records]
- 1998 'What Ya Got 4 Me' [Jinx]
- 1998 'Forever' (As Ron Hagen & Pascal M) [Jinx]
- 1999 'Coming On Strong' [Jinx]
- 1999 'Take You There' (As Ron Hagen & Pascal M) [Jinx]
- 1999 'Just Do It' [Untidy Trax]
- 1999 'The Recycle' (Tidy Trax)
- 1999 'On Stream' (As Ron Hagen & Pascal M) [BPM Dance White Label]
- 2000 'Solar Level' [Jinx]
- 2001 '5 Yards/Afterglow' [Jinx]
- 2001 'First Strike' [Jinx]
- 2002 'Cura Me' [Silver Premium]
- 2002 'Second Wave' [BPM Dance White Label]
- 2002 'Third Dimension' [Silver Premium]
- 2003 'Push Through/Sunny Changes' [A State of Trance]
- 2004 'Come Around Again' [A State of Trance]
- 2004 'Spacehopper / What Ya Got 4 Me?' [Tidy Trax]
- 2004 'The Timelord' [A State of Trance]
- 2005 'Back @ Ya / In Your Face' [A State of Trance]
- 2006 'What Ya Got 4 Me 2006 / Supersonic' [A State of Trance Limited]
- 2007 'Captured' [A State of Trance]
- 2007 'Harmonic / Cloud City' [A State of Trance]
- 2007 'Syndicate / Hit That Note' [A State of Trance]
- 2008 'Distant Signature' [A State of Trance]
- 2008 'Royal Flash / Any Given Moment' [A State of Trance]
- 2009 'Addicted' [A State of Trance]
- 2009 'Riddles In The Sand' (As Ron Hagen & Pascal M) [A State of Trance]
- 2009 'Healesville Sanctuary' (with Roger Shah) [Magic Island]
- 2010 'Ancient World' (with Roger Shah) [Magic Island]
- 2010 'Beyond This Earth' [Armada Music]

=== Remixes ===
- 1998 ATB - '9PM (Till I Come)' [Kontor]
- 1998 Alice Deejay - 'Better Off Alone' [Orbit]
- 1998 Travel - 'Bulgarian' [Jinx]
- 1998 Yves Deruyter - 'To The Rhythm' [Bonzai Records]
- 1998 Kay Cee - 'Escape' [Radikal Records]
- 1999 Stray Dog - 'Mirror' [React]
- 1999 Steve Blake - 'Expression' [Tidy Trax]
- 1999 Piet Blank & Jaspa Jones - 'After Love' [Lube]
- 1999 Scooter - 'Faster Harder Scooter' [Edel Records]
- 1999 Hand's Burn - 'Good Shot' [Essential Recordings]
- 1999 Web - 'Lovin' Times' [Intercord Tonträger GmbH]
- 2000 Crispy - 'In And Out' [Iceburg/Enjoy]
- 2000 Katana - 'Silence' [Netrecord-Z]
- 2000 The Space Brothers - 'Shine 2000' [Telstar TV]
- 2002 Futura Legend Featuring Christine - 'Restless Nature' [Jinx]
- 2003 Lost Tribe - 'Gamemaster' [Universal Music TV/Orbit]
- 2003 OceanLab - 'Beautiful Together' [Anjunabeats]
- 2003 Misja Helsloot - 'First Second' [First Second Records]
- 2003 Laura Turner - 'Soul Deep' [Curb]
- 2003 Delerium - 'Truly' [Nettwerk]
- 2004 Signum - First Strike (2004 Remake Edit) [EDM]
- 2004 DJ Danjo & Rob Styles - 'Duende' (ID&T)
- 2005 Armin van Buuren - 'Serenity' [Armind]
- 2005 Kenny Hayes - 'Daybreaker' [Turbulence]
- 2006 Above & Beyond - 'Can't Sleep' [Anjunabeats]
- 2007 Vincent de Moor - 'Flowtation 2007' [More Moor]
- 2007 Dan Stone - 'Road Test' [Red Force Recordings]
- 2008 Ascension - 'Someone' (2008 Mix) [Mostiko]
- 2009 Re:Locate - 'Rogue' [Yakuza]
- 2009 Roger Shah & Signum - 'Healesville Sanctuary' [405 Recordings/Magic Island Records]
- 2010 Alex M.O.R.P.H. feat. Ana Criado - Sunset Boulevard [Vandit]
- 2010 Dash Berlin feat. Solid Sessions - "Janeiro" [Aropa]
- 2011 Shogun feat. Emma Lock - Run to My Rescue [S107 Recordings]
- 2015 Alex Di Stefano - I've got the power (Signum Signal Remix)
