= A State of Trance 2012 =

Compilation album by Armin van Buuren
- Released: 1 March 2012
- Recorded: 2012
- Genres: Trance; progressive trance
- Length: 151:22
- Label: Armada
- Producer: Armin van Buuren

Armin van Buuren chronology
Universal Religion Chapter 5 (2011)	A State of Trance 2012 (2012)	Universal Religion Chapter 6 (2012)

Singles from A State of Trance 2012
- 1. "J'ai Envie de Toi" Released: 5 March 2012; 2. "Suddenly Summer" Released: 12 March 2012; 3. "Belter" Released: 26 March 2012

A State of Trance 2012 is the ninth compilation album in the A State of Trance compilation series mixed and compiled by Dutch DJ and record producer Armin van Buuren. It was released on 1 March 2012 by Armada Music.

== Track listing ==
Disc one: On the Beach
No.	Title	Artist	Length
1.	"The Fusion" (Armin van Buuren’s Intro Edit)	Omnia and IRA	3:45
2.	"Granadella"	VillaNaranjos	4:00
3.	"Try To Be Love" (Roger Shah's Naughty Love Remix)	Sunlounger and Zara Taylor	3:54
4.	"Piercing The Fog"	The Blizzard	3:38
5.	"Keep This Memory"	Audien	4:09
6.	"When The Sun" (Eximinds Remix)	Alexander Popov	3:23
7.	"Ushuaia Memories"	Nash & Pepper	3:14
8.	"Universal Language"	Mike Foyle and ReFeel	3:10
9.	"Always Loved, Never Forgotten" (The Day Will Come)	Tenishia	3:38
10.	"In Your Arms"	Andy Moor featuring Jessica Sweetman	3:50
11.	"Hyperfocus" (Wezz Devall Remix)	Mark Otten	3:00
12.	"Suddenly Summer"	Armin van Buuren featuring Ana Criado	4:10
13.	"Waking Up The Stars"	Alex M.O.R.P.H. and Protoculture	3:45
14.	"Down To Nothing" (A State of Trance Edit)	Susana and Max Graham	3:33
15.	"We Are What We Are"	Lemon and Einar K	3:01
Total length:			1:13:46

Disc two: In the Club
No.	Title	Artist	Length
1.	"Mumbai Traffic" (Club Mix - Armin van Buuren’s Intro Edit)	Ashley Wallbridge	3:44
2.	"Invasion" (The Official ASOT 550 Anthem)	W&W	2:48
3.	"Attractive Force"	Alexander Popov	3:56
4.	"Amsterdam"	Ørjan Nilsen	4:22
5.	"Overthrow" (Protoculture Remix)	James Dymond	3:16
6.	"Kinetic"	Abstract Vision and Elite Electronic	3:36
7.	"J'ai Envie de Toi"	Armin van Buuren presents Gaia	2:47
8.	"Blossom"	Abstract Vision and Elite Electronic	3:57
9.	"Nova Zembla" (Armin van Buuren Remix)	Wiegel Meirmans Snitker	3:05
10.	"550 Senta" (Aether Mix)	Andrew Rayel	3:57
11.	"Icarus"	Ralphie B	3:43
12.	"Megalodon"	MaRLo	3:37
13.	"Belter"	Armin van Buuren and Ørjan Nilsen	4:20
14.	"Concrete Angel" (John O'Callaghan Remix)	Gareth Emery featuring Christina Novelli	4:51
15.	"Dae Yor"	Paul van Dyk featuring Ummet Ozcan	3:33
16.	"Las Lilas"	John O'Callaghan and Heatbeat	4:54
17.	"Coming Home"	Aly & Fila vs. Jwaydan	4:45
Total length:			1:17:35

== Charts ==
Chart (2012)	Peak position
Dutch Albums (Album Top 100)	2
US Top Dance Albums (Billboard)	12
