= A State of Trance 2015 =

Compilation album by Armin van Buuren
- Released: 27 March 2015
- Recorded: 2015
- Genres: Trance; progressive trance
- Length: 2:27:24
- Label: Armada
- Producer: Armin van Buuren

Armin van Buuren chronology
Armin Anthems (Ultimate Singles Collected) (2014)	A State of Trance 2015 (2015)	A State of Trance Ibiza 2015 at Ushuaïa (2015)

Singles from A State of Trance 2015
- 1. "Together (In A State of Trance) (ASOT 700 Anthem)" Released: 9 January 2015; 2. "Safe Inside You" Released: 13 February 2015; 3. "Carnation" Released: 13 March 2015; 4. "Panta Rhei" Released: 23 March 2015; 5. "In Principio" Released: 20 April 2015

A State of Trance 2015 is the twelfth compilation album in the A State of Trance compilation series mixed and compiled by Dutch DJ and record producer Armin van Buuren. It was released on 27 March 2015 by Armada Music. The album received an 8/10 rating from Mixmag, with Ellie Hanagan calling it "energetic and exciting". It charted in both the Netherlands and Switzerland.

== Track listing ==
Disc one: On the Beach
No.	Title	Artist	Length
1.	"Going Home (Gareth Emery Remix) [Armin van Buuren’s Intro Mix]"	Cosmic Gate and Emma Hewitt	5:29
2.	"Pegasus"	Protoculture	3:45
3.	"The Truth We Can’t Escape"	Dawn	3:16
4.	"Looking Back"	Adam Szabo and Willem De Roo	3:30
5.	"The Edge"	Orjan Nilsen	2:55
6.	"Calipso"	DRYM	3:25
7.	"Ashes"	Denis Kenzo and Sarah Lynn	4:43
8.	"Step Into The Light"	Fabio XB and Liuck featuring Christina Novelli	3:41
9.	"Dreams Come True (DRYM Remix)"	Ruben de Ronde featuring Victoria Ray	3:41
10.	"Tesseract"	ilan Bluestone	4:29
11.	"What I Need (Ronski Speed Remix)"	Moiez and Alina Renae with Mike Shiver and Rapha	3:56
12.	"When The Sun Smiles"	Mino Safy	4:36
13.	"Atlas"	Eximinds and Yan Space	2:29
14.	"Moments"	Venom One and Tomas Heredia	3:14
15.	"UP (Mike Saint-Jules Remix)"	Canberra and Astrid Suryanto	3:38
16.	"Still Alive"	Timmus	4:19
17.	"4Ever (Dub Mix)"	Alex M.O.R.P.H. featuring Natalie Gioia	4:17
18.	"Time Stood Still"	Simon Patterson featuring Matt Adey	6:42
Total length:			1:12:11

Disc two: In the Club
No.	Title	Artist	Length
1.	"Together (In A State of Trance) (Intro Mix)"	Armin van Buuren	6:40
2.	"Overload"	Talemono	3:01
3.	"Multiverse"	Alexander Popov	2:56
4.	"Find Your Harmony (Driftmoon Stellar Mix)"	Andrew Rayel	3:58
5.	"Welcome To Earth"	Craig Connelly and Dan Thompson	3:58
6.	"Albino"	Faruk Sabanci	3:22
7.	"United"	Fisherman and Hawkins and Gal Abutbul	3:51
8.	"Panta Rhei"	Armin van Buuren and Mark Sixma	3:42
9.	"Handprint"	Eximinds and Vigel	3:25
10.	"Live Your Dream"	Arisen Flame and Driftmoon	2:28
11.	"Carnation"	Gaia	3:52
12.	"Freaks (Festival Mix)"	Jorn van Deynhoven	4:12
13.	"In Principio"	Gaia	3:47
14.	"Mr. Slade (Solarstone Pure Mix)"	Gai Barone	2:52
15.	"Magic Light"	Standerwick and Philippe El Sisi featuring Ana Criado	4:13
16.	"Safe Inside You"	Armin van Buuren and Rising Star featuring Betsie Larkin	5:47
17.	"Gravity"	Allen Watts	3:14
18.	"Proteus"	Dan Stone	4:45
19.	"Shine (Club Mix)"	Aly & Fila featuring Roxanne Emery	5:01
Total length:			1:15:13

== Charts ==
Chart (2011)	Peak position
Dutch Albums (Album Top 100)	2
Swiss Albums (Schweizer Hitparade)	9
US Top Dance Albums (Billboard)	5

== Release history ==
Region	Date	Label	Format	Catalog
Worldwide	27 March 2015	Armada	CD	ARMA403
