= A State of Trance 2011 =

Compilation album by Armin van Buuren
- Released: 18 March 2011
- Recorded: 2011
- Genres: Trance; progressive trance
- Length: 2:30:40
- Labels: Armada; Avex Asia
- Producer: Armin van Buuren

Armin van Buuren chronology
Mirage (2010)	A State of Trance 2011 (2011)	Universal Religion Chapter 5 (2011)

Singles from A State of Trance 2011
- 1. "Status Excessu D" Released: 16 March 2011; 2. "Winter Stayed" Released: 11 July 2011

A State of Trance 2011 is the eighth compilation album in the A State of Trance compilation series mixed and compiled by Dutch DJ and record producer Armin van Buuren. It was released on 18 March 2011 by Armada Music and Avex Asia.

== Track listing ==
Disc one
No.	Title	Artist	Length
1.	"Winter Stayed" (Armin van Buuren’s On the Beach Intro Mix)	Triple A	4:10
2.	"My Inner Island"	The Blizzard and Omnia	3:43
3.	"Slacker"	Mike Shiver vs. Matias Lehtola	4:10
4.	"Mormugao" (Alex Robert 2011 Mix)	Dreas vs. Alex Robert	3:37
5.	"Always Look Back"	Anhken	4:29
6.	"Green Cape Sunset"	Nuera	3:06
7.	"Sandstone"	Rex Mundi	4:44
8.	"Godless" (Protoculture Remix)	Robert Nickson and Thomas Datt	4:38
9.	"Lamento Sentimental"	Bobina	3:38
10.	"Libertine"	Mark Otten	4:05
11.	"So Caught Up"	Max Graham featuring Neev Kennedy	4:42
12.	"Moonlight Sonata"	Ashley Wallbridge	4:25
13.	"When Tomorrow Never Comes"	Beat Service featuring Cathy Burton	3:55
14.	"Rebound"	Arty and Mat Zo	2:43
Total length:			1:16:52

Disc two
No.	Title	Artist	Length
1.	"Now Is The Time" (Armin van Buuren’s Intro Edit)	Ron Hagen and Al Exander	3:50
2.	"My Enemy" (Rank 1 Remix)	Super8 & Tab featuring Julie Thompson	4:59
3.	"Skyfire"	Shogun	4:10
4.	"Talk To Me" (Ørjan Nilsen Trance Mix)	John O’Callaghan and Timmy & Tommy	3:47
5.	"Status Excessu D" (ASOT 500 Theme)	Armin van Buuren presents Gaia	4:00
6.	"Blackboard" (Jon O’Bir Remix)	Mark Eteson	4:00
7.	"If It Ain’t Broke"	Daniel Kandi and Phillip Alpha	4:59
8.	"Aether"	Andrew Rayel	7:51
9.	"Between The Rays"	Ørjan Nilsen	3:57
10.	"Take A Moment" (Alex M.O.R.P.H. Remix)	Armin van Buuren featuring Winter Kills	4:03
11.	"Stargazer"	Lost World	3:48
12.	"We Control The Sunlight"	Aly & Fila featuring Jwaydan	3:46
13.	"Dionysia"	Juventa	4:27
14.	"Painting Pyramids"	Bjorn Akesson	4:19
15.	"Use Somebody" (Armin van Buuren Rework)	Laura Jansen	8:35
Total length:			1:13:48

== Charts ==
Chart (2011)	Peak position
Dutch Albums (Album Top 100)	10
Mexican Albums (Top 100 Mexico)	24
Swiss Albums (Schweizer Hitparade)	14
US Top Dance Albums (Billboard)	10
