= Omnia (DJ) =

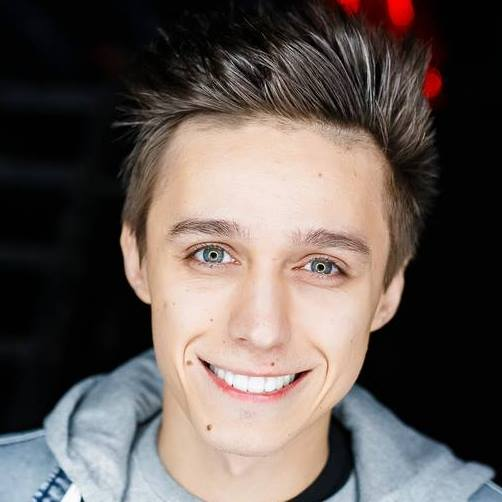

Background information
- Born: Smirnov Evgeny Aleksandrovich; May 18, 1987 (age 39); Donetsk, Ukrainian SSR, Soviet Union
- Genres: Trance, progressive trance, progressive house
- Occupations: DJ, Record Producer, Musician
- Instruments: Synthesizer, computer, sampler
- Years active: 2008–present
- Labels: Armada Music, Armind, Coldharbour Recordings, A State of Trance, Soundpiercing, Garuda, AVA Recordings, Black Hole Recordings, Adrian & Raz Recordings, Armada Captivating

Evgeny Smirnov (Ukrainian: Євген Смирнов; born May 18, 1987), known professionally as Omnia, is a Ukrainian DJ and record producer from Donetsk.

His music is associated with trance and progressive house. He gained international recognition through releases such as "The Fusion", a collaboration with IRA, and "The Light".

Omnia was ranked 58th in the DJ Mag Top 100 DJs poll in 2012 and 48th in 2013.

== Career ==
Smirnov began experimenting with electronic music production during his teenage years, using music sequencers and virtual instruments. He initially explored various musical styles before focusing on trance music. He began working professionally as a DJ in 2010, initially performing across Ukraine before receiving international bookings.

In 2010, Omnia began collaborating with the Norwegian trance duo The Blizzard. Their joint productions included "Metanoia" and "Closer", featuring vocalist Susana, both of which were among the top 20 tracks of 2010 on Armin van Buuren's radio show. Their subsequent collaboration, "My Inner Island", was included on the compilation A State of Trance 2011. The two acts also contributed a joint guest mix to Markus Schulz's Global DJ Broadcast. In a 2011 interview, Omnia said that their collaborations were conducted remotely and that they were working on further tracks together.

Omnia gained wider recognition in 2012 following the release of "The Fusion", a collaboration with Ira. The track became one of his breakthrough releases and was featured in DJ sets and electronic dance music events. In the same year, he made his debut in the DJ Mag Top 100 DJs poll at number 58. He also performed at A State of Trance 550 in Kyiv and events associated with Tiësto's Club Life and Global Gathering.

In an interview with DJ Mag, Omnia described 2012 as the "biggest year ever" for him, citing the combination of studio work and live performances as a particularly busy period in his career.

In 2013, Omnia climbed to number 48 in the DJ Mag Top 100 DJs poll. During the same year, he performed at the Summadayze festival in Australia, marking his Australian debut. His musical influences included trip-hop, Britpop, progressive house and drum and bass, in addition to trance.

In a 2013 interview with DJ Mag, Omnia said that he did not want to be limited to a particular musical genre, explaining that music itself was more important to him than genre classifications. He also spoke about his growing international career and his excitement at making his debut in Ibiza.

In November 2014, Omnia made his United States performance debut at Volume Nightclub in Seattle. In an interview with Dance Music Northwest, he recalled that a track of his had been played on Markus Schulz's radio show, prompting him to leave his previous job and concentrate on music production. The same year, he mixed A State of Trance 650: New Horizons, a compilation in Armin van Buuren's A State of Trance series, which included his remixes of Monogato's "Miami Vibe" and Ronski Speed's "Rise Again", featuring Lucy Saunders.

In 2015, Omnia released several productions, including "For the First Time", featuring Tilde, and "Shanghai", as well as "Reflex", a collaboration with Luke Bond. "For the First Time" reached number five in the A State of Trance Top 25 of 2015. In a January 2016 interview with EDMTunes, Omnia expressed surprise at the track's reception, noting that it had been released shortly before voting for the annual selection began.

"Shanghai" was named Tune of the Week on episode 741 of Armin van Buuren's A State of Trance radio show. Omnia's collaboration with Luke Bond, "Reflex", and his remix of Andrew Rayel's "Impulse" were included in Armin van Buuren's A State of Trance Year Mix 2015.

In 2016, Omnia released "Alien", followed by several productions and remixes, including his remix of Armin van Buuren's "Face of Summer", "Believe" featuring Audrey Gallagher and "All I See Is You" featuring Christian Burns.

In 2017, he collaborated with Johnny Rose on "Why Do You Run" and with DRYM on "Enigma". In a June 2017 interview with Dance Music Northwest, Omnia discussed his preference for melodic elements and emotional drops in his productions, and expressed his view that trance music was returning to its traditional sound.

In 2018, Omnia collaborated with Markus Schulz and vocalist Seri on "Road of No Return", which appeared on Schulz's album We Are the Light. Schulz explained that his professional relationship with Omnia dated back to their earlier work on a compilation and that they subsequently decided to produce an original collaboration together. Other releases that year included "CYBERPUNK" and "The Conquest", a collaboration with Ben Gold.

"CYBERPUNK" was also included in Armin van Buuren's A State of Trance Year Mix 2018.

In December 2018, Omnia launched his own record label, Omnia HQ, with the release of "Guide You Home", featuring vocalist Robin Vane. In an interview with We Rave You, Omnia explained that the production incorporated live instruments and electronic elements, combining dance and pop influences.

In 2019, Omnia and Ben Gold established the electronic music project FUTURECODE. In an interview with Fresh Music Freaks, Omnia explained that he had conceived the name before the collaboration began, intending it to represent a new project with a futuristic identity. The duo released "The Network" on 28 June 2019 through Armada Music.

In 2020, Omnia released the singles "NVRLND", "Bloom" and "Generation". In September, A State of Trance Showcase – Mix 012: Omnia was released, featuring a selection of his productions and collaborations, including "NVRLND", "Bloom", "Escape the Night" and "Generation".

In 2021, Omnia continued releasing music through ETRNTY, his own record label. Alongside his solo productions, he continued working as a remixer, contributing an extended remix of BT and April Bender's "Windows".

In 2022, Omnia collaborated with British DJ and producer Gareth Emery on "Unity", a track created in response to the Russian invasion of Ukraine. The collaboration was dedicated to supporting the people of Ukraine, with all proceeds from the track going to UNICEF Ukraine to assist children displaced by the war. Emery premiered the track during his performance at Ultra Music Festival in Miami in March 2022.

In 2024, Omnia continued releasing music through ETRNTY, his own record label, including the EP What You Need. In September, he returned to the Enhanced Progressive label with Lifelines, a collaboration with Ukrainian DJ and producer UUFO and vocalist Max Alexander. The release marked his return to the label after a period of releasing music exclusively through ETRNTY.

In 2025, Omnia collaborated with Dutch DJ and producer Armin van Buuren on "Love", released through Armind. The track became a regular feature of van Buuren's live sets at major electronic music events, including Ultra Music Festival, EDC Las Vegas and Dreamstate SoCal. Later that year, he reunited with British producer Gareth Emery for the single "Synthminds".

In 2026, Omnia continued collaborating with established artists in the trance scene, including Gabriel Eli on "In My Soul", released through Enhanced Progressive, and UUFO and Chris Burke on "Breathe", released through ETRNTY. He also released "As We Become One" through A State of Trance. During the year, he also performed at venues in Indonesia, Japan and China, including The Escape Jakarta, Club Piccadilly Umeda in Osaka and XLAB in Shenzhen.

Omnia has produced remixes for several electronic music artists, including Arty and Mat Zo, Markus Schulz, Cosmic Gate, Gareth Emery, Krewella, Andrew Rayel and Armin van Buuren. His remix credits include "Rebound" by Arty and Mat Zo, "Surreal" by Markus Schulz featuring Ana Criado, "Calm Down" by Cosmic Gate featuring Emma Hewitt, "Lights & Thunder" by Gareth Emery featuring Krewella, "Impulse" by Andrew Rayel and "Never Say Never" by Armin van Buuren featuring Jacqueline Govaert.

As a DJ, Omnia has performed at international electronic music festivals, including Global Gathering in the United Kingdom and Ukraine, Ultra Argentina, A State of Trance 600 in the Netherlands, Trancefusion in the Czech Republic and Summadayze in Australia. His club appearances have included Ministry of Sound, Zouk, Papaya, Privilege and Eden Ibiza, Ageha and Ellui.

Omnia hosted a monthly radio show titled Omnia Music Podcast, which was broadcast on Digitally Imported's Mainstage channel every fourth Wednesday of the month. An episode published on 22 March 2017 featured a guest mix by Genix.

== Discography ==
=== As Omnia ===
==== Singles & EPs ====
2008:

- In Progress and Omnia – "Air Flower" [Copyright Control]

2009:

- Omnia – "Stick in Monday" [Armada Music]

2010:

- The Blizzard and Omnia – "Metanoia" [Soundpiercing]
- Susana featuring Omnia and The Blizzard – "Closer" [S107 Recordings]

2011:

- Omnia presents Ain Mo – "Plug & Play / The Tune" [Soundpiercing]
- The Blizzard and Omnia – "My Inner Island" [Armind]

2012:

- Omnia featuring Melissa Loretta – "Halo" [AVA Recordings]
- Omnia and IRA – "The Fusion" [Coldharbour Recordings]
- Omnia and Cathy Burton – "Hearts Connected" [Adrian & Raz Recordings]
- Omnia and Ana Criado – "No One Home" [Adrian & Raz Recordings]
- Omnia – "Infina" [Coldharbour Recordings]

2013:

- Omnia – "The Light" [Coldharbour Recordings]
- Omnia – "Immersion" [Armind]
- Omnia featuring Everything by Electricity – "Bones" [Armind]

2014:

- Omnia – "Tomorrow People" [Armind]
- Omnia featuring Jonny Rose – "Two Hands" [Armind]

2015:

- Omnia featuring Tilde – "For the First Time" [Armind]
- Omnia – "Shanghai" [Armind]
- Omnia and Luke Bond – "Reflex" [Garuda]

2016:

- Omnia – "Alien" [Armind]
- Omnia – "Mystique" [Armind]
- Omnia and Audrey Gallagher – "I Believe" [A State of Trance]
- Omnia featuring Christian Burns – "All I See Is You" [Armind]
- Omnia – "Hold Me / Ultra" [Armind]

2017:

- Omnia and DRYM – "Enigma" [Armind]
- Omnia featuring Jonny Rose – "Why Do You Run" [Armind]
- Omnia featuring Danyka Nadeau – "Hold on to You" [Armind]
- Ben Gold and Omnia – "The Gateway" [A State of Trance]
- Omnia and Cathy Burton – "Searchlight" [A State of Trance]

2018:

- Omnia and Alex Sonata – "Titans" [Armada Music]
- DRYM and Omnia – "Ethereal" [Armada Music]
- Ben Gold and Omnia – "The Conquest" [Armada Music]
- Markus Schulz, Omnia and Seri – "Road of No Return" [Black Hole Recordings]
- Omnia featuring Danyka Nadeau – "For You" [Garuda]
- Omnia featuring Robin Vane – "Guide You Home" [Omnia HQ]

2019:

- Omnia and Whiteout – "U" [Armind]

2020:

- Omnia – "Generation" [Armada Music]
- Omnia – "Bloom" [Armind]
- Omnia – "NVRLND" [Armada Captivating]

2021:

- Omnia – "Eternity" [ETRNTY]
- Omnia – "Elektra" [ETRNTY]
- Omnia – "Arcanum" [ETRNTY]
- Omnia – "Take Me Away" [ETRNTY]
- Omnia – "Beautiful" [ETRNTY]
- Omnia – "Paradise" [ETRNTY]
- Omnia – "Forever" [ETRNTY]
- Omnia – "Fall Into You" [ETRNTY]

2022:

- Gareth Emery and Omnia – "Unity" [We'll Be OK]

2023:

- Omnia and UNDEROOD – "Allure" [ETRNTY]
- Omnia – "Aura" [ETRNTY]
- Omnia – "Feeling" [ETRNTY]

2024:

- Omnia – "The Bliss" [ETRNTY]
- Omnia – "The Diamond" [ETRNTY]
- Omnia – "What You Need" (EP) [ETRNTY]
- Omnia, UUFO and Max Alexander – "Lifelines" [Enhanced Progressive]
- Omnia – "The Face" [ETRNTY]

2025:

- Armin van Buuren and Omnia – "Love" [Armada Music]
- Omnia and UUFO – "Into the Light" [Catalystic]
- Omnia – "The Robot" [ETRNTY]
- Gareth Emery and Omnia – "Synthminds" [Create Music Group]
- Omnia and UUFO – "Hello" [ETRNTY]

2026:

- Omnia – "I See Light" [ETRNTY]
- Omnia and Gabriel Eli – "In My Soul" [Enhanced Progressive]
- Omnia – "As We Become One" [Armada Music]
- Omnia, UUFO and Chris Burke – "Breathe" [ETRNTY]

==== Remixes ====
2008:

- Ørjan Nilsen – "La Guitarra" (Omnia Remix) [Armind]
- In Progress presents Teya featuring Tiff Lacey – "Only You" (Omnia Remix) [Ask4 Records]
- In Progress – "Avalanche" (Omnia Remix) [Captured Music]

2009:

- Ron Hagen and Pascal M – "Riddles in the Sand" (Omnia Remix) [A State of Trance]
- Sequentia featuring Per Linden – "Undiscovered" (Omnia Remix) [Alter Ego Music]
- Monogato – "Miami Vibe" (Omnia Remix) [Armada Music]
- Armin van Buuren featuring Jacqueline Govaert – "Never Say Never" (Omnia Remix) [Armada Music]

2010:

- Smart Apes vs. Anna Lee featuring Kate Miles – "Perfect 2011" (Omnia Vocal Mix)

2011:

- ARTY and Mat Zo – "Rebound" (Omnia Remix) [Anjunabeats]
- Andy Moor vs. M.I.K.E. – "Spirit's Pulse" (Omnia Remix) [AVA Recordings]
- Boom Jinx featuring Justine Suissa – "Phoenix from the Flames" (Omnia and The Blizzard Remix) [Anjunabeats]
- Markus Schulz featuring Ana Criado – "Surreal" (Omnia Remix) [Armada Music]

2012:

- Cosmic Gate featuring Emma Hewitt – "Calm Down" (Omnia Remix) [Black Hole Recordings]
- Ashley Wallbridge featuring Audrey Gallagher – "Bang the Drum" (Omnia Remix) [Armada Music]

2013:

- Ronski Speed featuring Lucy Saunders – "Rise Again" (Omnia Remix) [Euphonic]

2014:

- Gareth Emery and Krewella – "Lights & Thunder" (Omnia Remix) [Garuda]

2015:

- Andrew Rayel – "Impulse" (Omnia Remix) [Armada Music]

2016:

- Armin van Buuren featuring Sarah deCourcy – "Face of Summer" (Omnia Remix) [Armind]

2017:

- Yan Space featuring Christian Burns – "Planet Earth" (Omnia Remix) [Armind]
- Raz Nitzan and Maria Nayler – "Nothing Breaks Like a Heart" (Omnia Remix) [RNM (RazNitzanMusic)]
- Giuseppe Ottaviani and Kyler England – "Firefly" (Omnia Remix) [Black Hole Recordings]

2018:

- Roman Messer and Betsie Larkin – "Unite" (Omnia Remix) [Suanda Music]
- Lange and Sarah Howells – "Out of the Sky" (Omnia Remix) [Black Hole Recordings]

2019:

- ReOrder and Cassandra Grey – "Goodbye" (Omnia Remix) [Black Hole Recordings]

2021:

- Gareth Emery – "I Saw Your Face" (Omnia Remix) [Gareth Emery]
- BT and April Bender – "Windows" (Omnia Remix) [Black Hole Recordings]

2022:

- Morgan Page featuring jeonghyeon – "Addict" (Omnia Remix) [Armada Music]
- Farius and Cristina Soto – "On My Mind" (Omnia Remix) [Enhanced Progressive]

2023:

- Christina Novelli, DRYM and GXD – "Saving Grace" (Omnia Mix) [Valteon]

2025:

- Darren Tate and Mike Koglin – "Now Is the Time" (Omnia Remix) [Armada Captivating]

=== As FUTURECODE (2019 - Present) ===
In 2019, Omnia formed the electronic music duo FUTURECODE with British DJ and producer Ben Gold.

2019:

- FUTURECODE featuring Roxanne Emery – "Dancing in the Rain" [Armada Music]
- FUTURECODE – "The Connection" [Armada Music]
- FUTURECODE and Ruben de Ronde – "Trinity" [A State of Trance]
- FUTURECODE – "The Network" [Armada Music]
- Claudia Cazacu featuring Audrey Gallagher – "Freefalling" (FUTURECODE Remix) [Armada Music]

2020:

- FUTURECODE featuring Roxanne Emery – "Dancing in the Rain" (Craig Connelly Remix) [Who's Afraid of 138?!]

== See Also ==
- The Blizzard
