= Uplifting trance =

Genre of electronic dance music

- Stylistic origins: Trance; progressive trance; dream trance; balearic trance; hard trance; classical music
- Cultural origins: 1990s, Netherlands, Germany, UK
- Derivative forms: Uplifting psytrance

Other topics
- Progressive house; vocal trance; hardcore; liquid funk; Goa trance; Eurodance

Uplifting trance (often synonymous with epic trance, energetic trance, anthem trance, emotional trance, or euphoric trance) is a broad subgenre of trance music. The name, which emerged in the wake of progressive trance in 1996, is derived from the feeling which listeners claim to get (often described as a "rush"). The genre is popular in the trance scene. Classical music strongly influenced the development of uplifting trance both in the 1990s and in the 2000s, with film music also considered influential.

== Characteristics ==
In general, uplifting trance is a style much happier in tone than other trance genres (such as Goa). Instead of the darker tone of Goa, uplifting trance uses similar chord progressions as progressive trance, but tracks' chord progressions usually rest on a major chord, and the balance between major and minor chords in a progression will determine how "happy" or "sad" the progression sounds.

The genre features longer major chord progressions in all elements (lead synth, bass, and treble). It also contains extended breakdowns and relegation of arpeggiation (the melodic part of the song, usually consisting of "Saw Synths/Square Lead" type sounds) to the background while bringing wash effects to the fore (the harmonic element of the music, or "background fill", usually consisting of synth choir/voice/string chord progressions).

As a rule of thumb, trance beats are in the range of 135–140 BPM. Uplifting trance very commonly employs side-chain compression, a modern production technique. It is commonly referred to as "ducking the kick", where the background strings/synths have their volume automated, creating a pulsing effect on the off-beat.

== Current status ==
In the late 1990s, deejays Paul Oakenfold, Sasha & Digweed, and Paul van Dyk became known for their uplifting trance music. A decade later, uplifting trance re-established itself within the trance scene, played by such artists as 4 Strings, ATB, Ferry Corsten, Armin van Buuren, Dash Berlin, RAM, Tiësto and Above & Beyond. John O'Callaghan, Daniel Kandi, Bryan Kearney, Andy Blueman, Aly & Fila, Sean Tyas and Super8 & Tab focused particularly on uplifting trance as their overriding genre. In addition, online radio stations such as Paris One and Afterhours.FM devoted airtime to uplifting trance. In September 2009, Afterhours.FM hosted "Uplift Day" that was exclusively dedicated to uplifting trance.
