= A State of Trance Ibiza 2015 at Ushuaïa =

Compilation album by Armin van Buuren
- Released: 20 August 2015
- Recorded: 2015
- Genres: Trance; progressive trance
- Length: 2:27:21
- Label: Armada
- Producer: Armin van Buuren

Armin van Buuren chronology
| A State of Trance 2015 (2015) | A State of Trance Ibiza 2015 at Ushuaïa (2015) | Embrace (2015) |

A State of Trance Ibiza 2015 at Ushuaïa is the second compilation album in the A State of Trance Ibiza compilation series mixed and compiled by the Dutch DJ and record producer Armin van Buuren. It was released on 20 August 2015 by Armada Music.

== Critical review ==
According to webmedia Radio and Music, "Performing in-the-round at Ushuaïa as white-hot spotlights hit him from above, Armin is the focus of everyone’s attention as he carefully crafts his musical journey. From beneath the fireworks blasting over his head, Armin connects with each individual. A time capsule that’s nonetheless timeless, A State of Trance Ibiza 2015 at Ushuaïa is the sound of endless summer."

== Track listing ==
Disc one
| No. | Title | Artist | Length |
|---|---|---|---|
| 1. | "The Walk (Intro)" | Armin van Buuren | 2:13 |
| 2. | "Panta Rhei" | Armin van Buuren and Mark Sixma | 1:56 |
| 3. | "Another You (Headhunterz Remix)" | Armin van Buuren featuring Mr. Probz | 3:31 |
| 4. | "The One" | W&W | 2:44 |
| 5. | "Rise of the Era (Digital X Remix)" | Andrew Rayel | 2:46 |
| 6. | "Aika (Rafaël Frost Remix)" | BT, Super8 & Tab | 4:42 |
| 7. | "Destiny (Kyau & Albert Remix)" | Markus Schulz featuring Delacey | 3:38 |
| 8. | "Omen" | Willem de Roo | 3:02 |
| 9. | "Ocean Drive" | Joonas Hahmo x K-System | 3:09 |
| 10. | "Frontera" | Fast Distance | 2:40 |
| 11. | "Elevation" | Deem | 3:18 |
| 12. | "Café Del Mar" | Beat Service | 3:38 |
| 13. | "Paradise" | Alexander Popov and LTN featuring Christina Novelli | 2:56 |
| 14. | "The Dreamers" | MaRLo featuring Jano | 4:07 |
| 15. | "Tubular Bells" | Tommy Johnson | 4:29 |
| 16. | "If I Run (Venom One Remix)" | Antillas featuring Anki | 3:27 |
| 17. | "For the First Time" | Omnia featuring Tilde | 3:09 |
| 18. | "Nepal" | Yoel Lewis | 3:09 |
| 19. | "Belvedere" | Rodrigo Deem | 3:31 |
| 20. | "Southbound" | Protoculture | 2:33 |
| 21. | "Mimesis" | Andrew Rayel and Alexander Popov | 2:40 |
| 22. | "Butterfly" | Corti Organ | 5:20 |
| Total length: | | | 1:12:38 |

Disc two
| No. | Title | Artist | Length |
|---|---|---|---|
| 1. | "Don (Intro Mix)" | Ørjan Nilsen | 5:10 |
| 2. | "Stellar" | Mark Sixma | 3:09 |
| 3. | "Juno" | Rank 1 vs. M.I.K.E. Push | 4:22 |
| 4. | "Escape (Heatbeat Remix)" | Sebastien featuring Satellite Empire | 3:46 |
| 5. | "Shockwave" | Radion6 | 2:59 |
| 6. | "Chased" | Andrew Rayel and Mark Sixma | 3:24 |
| 7. | "It's Killing Me" | Heatbeat | 3:21 |
| 8. | "Fireball" | Arisen Flame | 3:06 |
| 9. | "101010 (The Perfect Ten)" | Jorn van Deynhoven | 3:37 |
| 10. | "Anahera" | Ferry Corsten Presents Gouryella | 5:27 |
| 11. | "Statues (Bryan Kearney Remix)" | Bryn Liedl featuring Bethany Marie | 3:48 |
| 12. | "Amistad" | Alex M.O.R.P.H. and Heatbeat | 4:46 |
| 13. | "Zephyr" | ReOrder | 2:48 |
| 14. | "Glow" | Jase Thirlwall | 3:46 |
| 15. | "Arms of Surrender" | Ana Criado and ReOrder | 4:00 |
| 16. | "Shadows (Stoneface & Terminal Remix)" | Yahel and Liya | 4:14 |
| 17. | "Bring You Home (Ronski Speed Remix)" | Dennis Sherperd featuring Chloe Langley | 5:28 |
| 18. | "See the Sun (Dan Stone Rework)" | Matt Darey featuring Kate Louise Smith | 2:37 |
| 19. | "Game of Thrones Theme (Armin van Buuren Remix)" | Ramin Djawadi | 5:01 |
| Total length: | | | 1:14:43 |

== Charts ==
| Chart (2015) | Peak position |
|---|---|
| Dutch Albums (Album Top 100) | 3 |

== Release history ==
| Region | Date | Label | Format | Catalog |
|---|---|---|---|---|
| Worldwide | 20 August 2015 | Armada | CD, digital download | ARMA413 |
