= Make It Right =

Make It Right may refer to:

== Music ==
- Make It Right (album), by Abel, 2012
- "Make It Right" (BTS song), 2019
- "Make It Right" (Lisa Stansfield song), 1994
- "Make It Right" (Armin van Buuren song), 2016
- "Make It Right", a song by Foo Fighters from Concrete and Gold
- "Make It Right", a song by New Found Glory from Coming Home
- "Make It Right", a 2016 song by Lucas & Steve
- "Make It Right", a song by Christian Falk

== Other uses ==
- Make It Right (TV series), a Thai romantic comedy series
- Make It Right Foundation, a non-profit foundation founded by Brad Pitt
