= A State of Trance Ibiza 2016 =

Compilation album by Armin van Buuren
- Released: 19 August 2016
- Recorded: 2016
- Genres: Trance; progressive trance
- Length: 4:28:44
- Label: Armada
- Producer: Armin van Buuren

Armin van Buuren chronology
Old Skool (2016)	A State of Trance Ibiza 2016 (2016)	A State of Trance 2017 (2017)

Singles from A State of Trance 2016
- 1. "The Race" Released: 19 August 2016; 2. "Flashlight" Released: 24 November 2016

A State of Trance Ibiza 2016 is the third compilation album in the A State of Trance Ibiza compilation series mixed and compiled by Dutch DJ and record producer Armin van Buuren. It was released on 19 August 2016 by Armada Music. It includes collaborative tracks "The Race" (with Dave Winnel) and "Flashlight" (with Ørjan Nilsen).

== Track listing ==
On the Beach
No.	Title	Artist	Length
1.	"Before the Story"	Luke Bond	2:52
2.	"Follow the Light"	Arty and Andrew Bayer	4:22
3.	"Left Behinds"	Paris Blohm and Taylr Renee	3:00
4.	"Battlefront"	David Gravell	3:30
5.	"Sun Goes Down"	Estiva	3:23
6.	"Amun"	ilan Bluestone and Jason Ross	3:35
7.	"Wired"	Rodg	3:18
8.	"Crocodile Tears"	Kryder	3:25
9.	"Body Language"	Same K and Stendahl	2:11
10.	"Edge of Life"	Cosmic Gate and Eric Lumiere	3:17
11.	"Hyperdrive"	Willem de Roo	2:49
12.	"Crux"	Mohamed Ragab and Attila Syah	3:40
13.	"Vela"	Assaf	2:54
14.	"Revive (Airborn Remix)"	Snatt & Vix	3:32
15.	"Luna"	Protoculture and Johnny Yono	3:47
16.	"Mystique"	Omnia	3:26
17.	"Restart (Henry Dark Remix)"	KhoMha featuring Mike Schmid	3:15
18.	"Smile"	DRYM featuring Jennifer Rene	3:21
19.	"You and Me"	MaRLo featuring Chloe	3:01
Total length:			1:10:14

In the Club
No.	Title	Artist	Length
1.	"The Race"	Armin van Buuren and Dave Winnel	3:05
2.	"Off the Hook (Mark Sixma Remix)"	Hardwell and Armin van Buuren	2:43
3.	"Flashlight"	Armin van Buuren and Ørjan Nilsen	3:06
4.	"The Funkatron"	Robbie Rivera and Tom Staar	3:16
5.	"All Systems Down"	Andrew Rayel and KhoMha	3:32
6.	"Caught in the Slipstream (KhoMha Remix)"	Armin van Buuren featuring BullySongs	3:18
7.	"The New World (Fisherman & Hawkins Remix)"	Markus Schulz	3:54
8.	"Into"	Super8 & Tab	3:24
9.	"Gotta Be Love (Giuseppe Ottaviani Remix)"	Armin van Buuren featuring Lyrica Anderson	3:51
10.	"I Believe"	Omnia and Audrey Gallagher	2:55
11.	"Neo Paradise"	Jorn van Deynhoven	3:23
12.	"Hands to Heaven (Chris Schweizer Remix)"	Armin van Buuren featuring Rock Mafia	2:48
13.	"Restless Hearts (Ben Nicky Remix)"	Mark Sixma and Emma Hewitt	4:14
14.	"Smack (Waio Remix)"	Simon Patterson	3:29
15.	"Aerys (Mark Sherry Remix)"	Heatbeat	3:34
16.	"Until We Meet Again (Ben Nicky Remix)"	Gareth Emery and Ben Gold	3:47
17.	"Ignite (Allen Watts Melodic Remix)"	Allen, Envy & UDM	2:59
18.	"The Switch"	Ben Nicky and Chris Schweizer	2:15
Total length:			1:16:18

== Charts ==
Chart (2015)	Peak position
Dutch Albums (Album Top 100)	3

== Release history ==
Region	Date	Label	Format	Catalog
Worldwide	19 August 2016	Armada	CD, digital download	ARMA430
