= A State of Trance 2016 =

Compilation album by Armin van Buuren
- Released: 6 May 2016
- Recorded: 2016
- Genres: Trance; progressive trance
- Length: 2:17:05
- Label: Armada
- Producer: Armin van Buuren

Armin van Buuren chronology
Embrace (2015)	A State of Trance 2016 (2016)	Old Skool (2016)

Singles from A State of Trance 2016
- 1. "Inyathi" Released: 15 April 2016

A State of Trance 2016 is the thirteenth compilation album in the A State of Trance compilation series mixed and compiled by Dutch DJ and record producer Armin van Buuren. It was released on 6 May 2016 by Armada Music. It charted in both the Netherlands and Switzerland.

== Track listing ==
Disc one: On the Beach
No.	Title	Artist	Length
1.	"Alien"	Omnia	4:03
2.	"Sunshine Blue"	Denis Kenzo & Sveta B.	3:31
3.	"Floyd"	Jerome Isma-Ae & Alastor	4:01
4.	"High on Life"	Rodg	3:53
5.	"Distance"	Same K	2:45
6.	"Beautiful Creature"	Ana Criado & Denis Kenzo	3:45
7.	"Power Core"	Estiva	3:43
8.	"Beirut"	Henry Dark	3:41
9.	"Iconic"	Ørjan Nilsen	3:53
10.	"Elysia"	Venom One	3:37
11.	"Los Capos"	Ørjan Nilsen vs. KhoMha	3:05
12.	"Grindstone (Original Guitar Mix)"	Driftmoon feat. Eller	3:30
13.	"Goldengate"	Yoel Lewis	3:19
14.	"Spacewalk"	Alexander Popov & Digital X	2:44
15.	"World Like This"	Alexander Popov & Jonathan Mendelsohn	3:45
16.	"Ceasarea"	Yoel Lewis feat. Sivan	3:49
17.	"XO"	Genix	3:27
18.	"Anything Can Happen"	Fatum & JES	3:41
19.	"Freefall (Manse Remix)"	Armin van Buuren feat. BullySongs	2:33
Total length:			1:06:45

Disc two: In the Club
No.	Title	Artist	Length
1.	"Embrace (Arty Remix)"	Armin van Buuren feat. Eric Vloeimans	3:30
2.	"Again (Armin van Buuren Remix)"	Armin van Buuren presents Rising Star feat. Betsie Larkin	3:11
3.	"Mega"	Super8 & Tab	3:04
4.	"Epiphany"	Andrew Rayel	3:18
5.	"Stay Awake"	David Gravell	3:08
6.	"Inyathi"	Gaia	2:56
7.	"Now I Can Breathe Again"	Simon Patterson feat. Lucy Pullin	3:38
8.	"Now & Forever"	M.I.K.E. Push presents Plastic Boy	4:11
9.	"Livin the Dream"	Radion6	3:02
10.	"Centurio"	Ayda	3:51
11.	"Everest"	Re:Locate vs Robert Nickson	3:26
12.	"We Can Fly"	Jorn van Deynhoven	3:01
13.	"Flashback"	Jorn van Deynhoven	3:15
14.	"Fortress (Seven Lions Roots Mix)"	Illenium feat. Joni Fatora	4:35
15.	"Out There (Robert Nickson 2016 Remix)"	Masters & Nickson feat. Justine Suissa	4:08
16.	"By My Side"	Bryan Kearney & Christina Novelli	3:55
17.	"I Could Be Stronger (But Only For You) (Giuseppe Ottaviani Remix)"	Gareth Emery	3:42
18.	"I'm In A State Of Trance (ASOT 750 Anthem)"	Ben Gold	3:43
19.	"Follow Me (Psyburst Mix)"	Mark Sherry meets Space Frog & Derb	3:08
20.	"Alpha Omega (Sneijder Remix)"	Team Argentina	3:38
Total length:			1:10:20

== Release history ==
Region	Date	Label	Format	Catalog
Worldwide	6 May 2016	Armada	CD	ARMA424
