= Stardust (composition) =

2015 composition by Jean-Michel Jarre and Armin van Buuren

Single by Jean-Michel Jarre and Armin van Buuren

from the album Electronica 1: The Time Machine
- Released: 31 July 2015
- Genre: Uplifting trance
- Length: 4:38
- Label: Columbia; Sony
- Songwriters: Jean-Michel Jarre; Armin van Buuren
- Producers: Jean-Michel Jarre; Armin van Buuren

Jean-Michel Jarre singles chronology
"Watching You" (2015)	"Stardust" (2015)	"If!..." (2015)

Armin van Buuren singles chronology
"Another You" (2015)	"Stardust" (2015)	"Off the Hook" (2015)

"Stardust" is an instrumental composition by French composer and producer Jean-Michel Jarre in collaboration with Dutch disc jockey and producer Armin van Buuren. It was released on 31 July 2015 as digital download by Columbia Records as the fifth single from Jarre's seventeenth studio album, Electronica 1: The Time Machine.

== Background and release ==
Jean-Michel Jarre has been Armin van Buuren's musical idol during its childhood. Van Buuren's music is often inspired by Jarre's productions. Jarre declared about the track : “I also think that this track is conveying both our identities”.

Their collaboration was revealed during van Buuren's performance at Tomorrowland 2015 in Belgium.

== Critical review ==
Tim Olsson from webmedia We Rave You noticed that "The track includes the perfect blend of both artists’ personal sounds, which was also an important goal for the track." Bulbi from French webmedia Guettapen asserted that "the result is an absolutely superb uplifting trance track. The kind of sounds which send you to the stars. It should be listened with eyes closed".

== Track listing ==
France - Digital download - Columbia

1. "Stardust" – 4:38

Digital download

1. "Stardust" (Rising Star Remix) - 5:42

== Charts ==
Chart (2015)	Peak position
Belgium (Ultratip Bubbling Under Flanders)	78
Belgium (Ultratip Bubbling Under Wallonia)	44
France (SNEP)	180
