= Angel Taylor =

American singer-songwriter (born 1988)

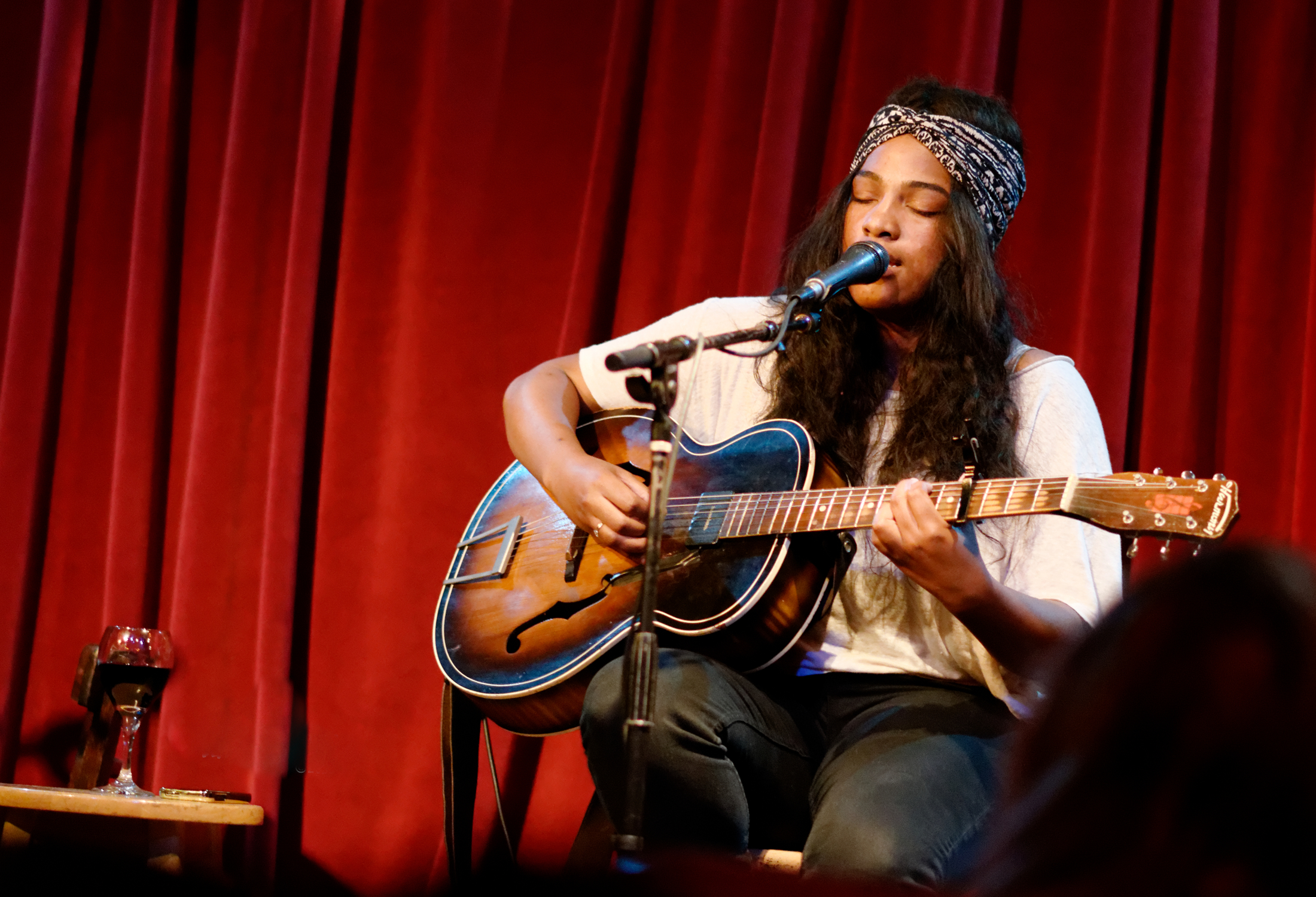

Background information
- Born: Angel Mae Taylor; March 20, 1988 (age 38); Sylmar, California, U.S.
- Origin: Los Angeles, California, U.S.
- Genres: Pop, soul
- Occupation: Singer-songwriter
- Instruments: Vocals, guitar, keyboard
- Years active: 2009–present
- Labels: Aware, Columbia
- Website: www.angeltayloronline.com

Angel Mae Taylor (born 1988) is an American guitarist, singer and songwriter. She has released an LP and two EPs.

== Biography ==
Taylor was born on 20 March 1988 in Los Angeles, California, the youngest of five daughters of LaTonya Taylor. She has lived in both Sylmar and Santa Clarita, California. An older sister, Ebony, appeared on the fifth season of America's Next Top Model.

== Musical career ==
Taylor had no musical education, and taught herself to play piano and guitar. She was inspired to start writing songs at the age of 13 when her sister Ebony, a year older, began writing poetry.

Her recording career began when she contacted producer Mikal Blue, who had worked with Colbie Caillat, Brendan James and Jason Reeves, about renting his studio to record a few songs for her family. Blue decided he wanted to work with her after hearing her songs and offered to help her get a record deal. A few months later, Taylor took her first plane ride to the record label studio in New York. After signing with Aware/Columbia Records, she was able to move into her first home with her mother and two of her sisters.

Her debut album, Love Travels, was released on iTunes on March 31, 2009, through Aware/Columbia Records. She had previously released an EP. Her song "Make Me Believe" was offered as the iTunes single of the week during the week of March 30, 2009, and she was featured as one of VH1's You Oughtta Know: Artist on the rise.

Taylor has toured with a variety of artists including Adele, Kate Voegele, Brett Dennen, Brandi Carlile and Gavin DeGraw. She was a supporting artist, with Five For Fighting, Mat Kearney and Sugar Ray, in concerts during the summer of 2009.

She was a contestant on the second season of The Voice, where she picked Maroon 5 lead singer Adam Levine as her coach. She was eliminated in later rounds and did not perform in the live shows.

Taylor's song "Like You Do" was featured in the score of the next to last episode of The CW's One Tree Hill's sixth season, and a season 2 episode of VH1's Tough Love, in which she also performed on the show. "Make Me Believe" was featured on 90210 on May 5, 2009. She released an EP, Motion, in 2012.

In 2013, Taylor worked with California-based DJ Mako and was the featured vocalist for his song "Beam" (Dannic Mix). In 2014, she was featured vocalist on "Up All Night" by Russian DJ Arty, which became the first single taken from his 2015 album Glorious.

In 2015, she provided vocals for "Make It Right" on Armin van Buuren's album Embrace. She has also collaborated with Tritonal on "Getaway", AFSHeeN on "Would It Be Ok", and HARBER on "Me and My Friends".

In 2019, she was the vocalist on Morgan Page's single "Reason for Living", which was included in "Beat Saber (Original Game Soundtrack), Vol. III".

== Discography ==
Albums

- Love Travels EP (2009)
- Motion EP (2012)

Singles

- "Someone Like You" (2012)
- "Mama Said" (2019)
- "Selfish Kinda Lover" (2020)
- "Hard to Hold" (2021)
