= Heading Up High =

Single by Armin van Buuren featuring Kensington

from the album Embrace
- Released: 5 February 2016
- Recorded: Armada Studios, Amsterdam
- Genre: Progressive house; pop rock
- Length: 3:52
- Label: Armind; Armada
- Songwriters: Armin van Buuren; Benno de Goeij; Casper Starreveld; Eloi Youssef; Jan Haker; Niles Vandenberg
- Producers: Armin van Buuren; Benno de Goeij; Kensington

Armin van Buuren singles chronology
"Strong Ones" (2015)	"Heading Up High" (2016)	"Freefall" (2016)

Kensington singles chronology
"Done with It" (2015)	"Heading Up High" (2016)	"Do I Ever" (2016)

"Heading Up High" is a song by Dutch disc jockey and record producer Armin van Buuren. It features the Dutch band Kensington. The track was released in the Netherlands by Armind as a digital download on 5 February 2016 as the fourth single from van Buuren's sixth album Embrace.

The First State remix of the song was more often played by Armin van Buuren during his shows.

== Background and release ==
Armin van Buuren declared about the song “I wanted to create a song that was just totally unexpected and I'd been drawn to the sound of Kensington for some time. We really vibed well together and I think my long-time dance music fans may be surprised by some elements of this song. It just really soars and I get a great reaction whenever I play it out! It's got the feel of worlds coming together.”

== Reception ==
According to Amanda Mesa from webmedia Dancing Astronaut, "Infectious and high-energy, “Heading Up High” is yet another example of Embrace’s genre-fluidity. [...] Overall, “Heading Up High” is a roller coaster across intense highs and lows that'll leave you hanging on for more."

== Music video ==
A music video to accompany the release of "Heading Up High" was first premiered worldwide by MTV on 9 February 2016. The music video shows a live performance by both Armin van Buuren & Kensington in a prison populated by inmates. Hardwell appears as one of the prisoners of the video. The song encourages the captives literally to head up high towards a loophole.

== Track listing ==
- Netherlands Digital download (ARMAS1125A)
1. "Heading Up High" – 3:52
2. "Heading Up High" (Dimitri Vegas & Like Mike vs. BOOSTEDKIDS Radio Edit) – 2:34
3. "Heading Up High" (Years Radio Edit) – 4:04
4. "Heading Up High" (First State Radio Edit) – 3:52
5. "Heading Up High" (Dimitri Vegas & Like Mike vs. BOOSTEDKIDS Remix) – 5:21
6. "Heading Up High" (Years Remix) – 5:40
7. "Heading Up High" (First State Remix) – 5:52

== Charts ==
Chart (2016)	Peak position
Netherlands (Dutch Top 40)	12
Netherlands (Single Top 100)	35

== Certifications ==
Region	Certification	Certified units/sales
Netherlands (NVPI)	Platinum	30,000^{‡}
^{‡} Sales+streaming figures based on certification alone.
