= Rivals (Kensington album) =

Studio album by Kensington
- Released: 8 August 2014
- Recorded: 2014
- Studios: YouGuysMusic, Berlin
- Genres: Alternative rock; indie rock; pop rock
- Length: 38:36
- Label: Universal
- Producers: Kensington; Niels Zuiderhoek

Kensington chronology
Vultures (2012)	Rivals (2014)	Control (2016)

Singles from Rivals
- 1. "Streets" Released: 4 April 2014; 2. "All for Nothing" Released: 8 August 2014; 3. "War" Released: 7 November 2014; 4. "Riddles" Released: 1 May 2015; 5. "Done with It" Released: 28 September 2015

Rivals is the third studio album by the Dutch rock band Kensington. It was released on 8 August 2014 by Universal Music. This was the band's first album peaked at #1 in the Netherlands.

== Track listing ==
All tracks are written by Kensington and Niels Zuiderhoek.

No.	Title	Length
1.	"Streets"	3:07
2.	"All for Nothing"	4:50
3.	"Done with It"	3:22
4.	"System"	3:25
5.	"Riddles"	3:28
6.	"War"	2:56
7.	"Don't Walk Away"	3:31
8.	"Little Light"	5:07
9.	"Words You Don't Know"	3:50
10.	"Rivals"	5:00

== Personnel ==
Credits for Rivals are adapted from the official liner notes and Tidal.

=== Kensington ===
- Casper Starreveld – guitar, vocals
- Eloi Youssef – vocals, guitar
- Jan Haker – bass guitar
- Niles Vandenberg – drums

=== Additional musicians ===
- Camilla van der Kooij – strings (tracks 2, 6, 8)
- Erik-Jan Grob – organ (track 8)

=== Technical ===
- Kensington – production, recording
- Niels Zuiderhoek – production, recording
- Francesco Donadello – engineering
- Niek Foglia – engineering
- Cedric Muyres – management
- Joe LaPorta – mastering
- Tom Lord-Alge – mixing
- Mare van der Holst – artwork
- Rutger van der Bent – photography

== Charts ==
=== Weekly charts ===
Chart (2014–2022)	Peak position
Dutch Albums (Album Top 100)	1
Belgian Albums (Ultratop Flanders)	30

=== Year-end charts ===
Chart (2014)	Position
Dutch Albums (Album Top 100)	14
Chart (2015)	Position
Dutch Albums (Album Top 100)	5
Chart (2016)	Position
Dutch Albums (Album Top 100)	14
Chart (2017)	Position
Dutch Albums (Album Top 100)	36
Chart (2018)	Position
Dutch Albums (Album Top 100)	76

== Certifications ==
Region	Certification	Certified units/sales
Netherlands (NVPI)	Platinum	40,000^{^}
^{‡} Sales+streaming figures based on certification alone.
