= Kensington (band) =

Dutch rock band

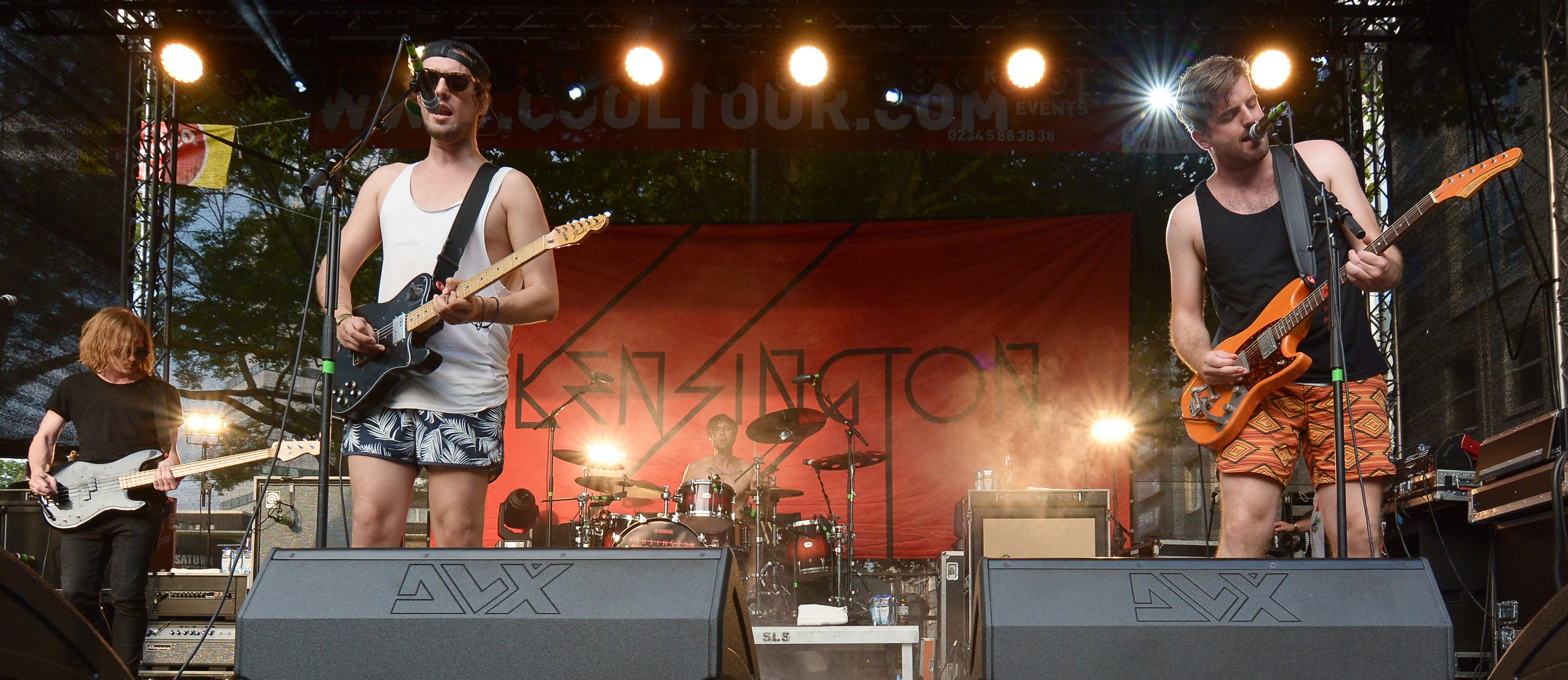
- Kensington performing in 2015

Background information
- Origin: Utrecht, Netherlands
- Genres: Rock; arena rock; indie rock
- Years active: 2005–present
- Label: Universal
- Members: Casper Starreveld; Jan Haker; Niels Vandenberg; Jason Dowd
- Past members: Lucas Lenselink; Eloi Youssef
- Website: kensingtonband.com

Kensington is a Dutch rock band from Utrecht that was formed in 2005. The band consists of lead vocalist Jason Dowd, guitarist Casper Starreveld, bassist Jan Haker and drummer Niels Vandenberg. The band has four number-one albums in the Netherlands and three Platinum-certified albums.

Former lead vocalist Eloi Youssef was in the band from 2006 to 2022. He departed following a series of six sold-out farewell concerts at Amsterdam's Ziggo Dome. The American-born Dowd was named as his successor in 2025.

De Volkskrant in 2023 named Kensington "the most successful Dutch rock band of the last fifteen years". From 2015 to Youssef's final show in 2022, the band sold out the Ziggo Dome 19 consecutive times, leading them to be dubbed the arena's "house band". Kensington also performed the largest concert by a Dutch rock band in the country's history when they sold out the Johan Cruyff Arena in 2018 with 51,000 tickets.

== Biography ==
=== Early years (2005–2008) ===
Before Kensington, guitarist Casper Starreveld, bassist Jan Haker and drummer Lucas Lenselink played together as Quad, for a secondary school assignment at Montessori Lyceum Herman Jordan in Zeist. In 2005, they became Kensington and added Eloi Youssef in 2006. Their first releases were a two-song promo single An Introduction To... and the five-song Kensington EP in 2007. This self-produced EP was recorded in the Second Moon Studio of Dutch folk singer Hessel van der Kooij, on the island of Terschelling, and was mixed and mastered by Martijn Groeneveld in the Mailmen Studios in Utrecht.

At the end of the year, drummer Lenselink left the band because he did not see a professional future for himself and wanted to finish his university studies. Drummer Niles Vandenberg, formerly of Griffin, joined the band in February 2008. Their second EP Youth was released on 12 December 2008. It led to the band signing with Bladehammer/EMI.

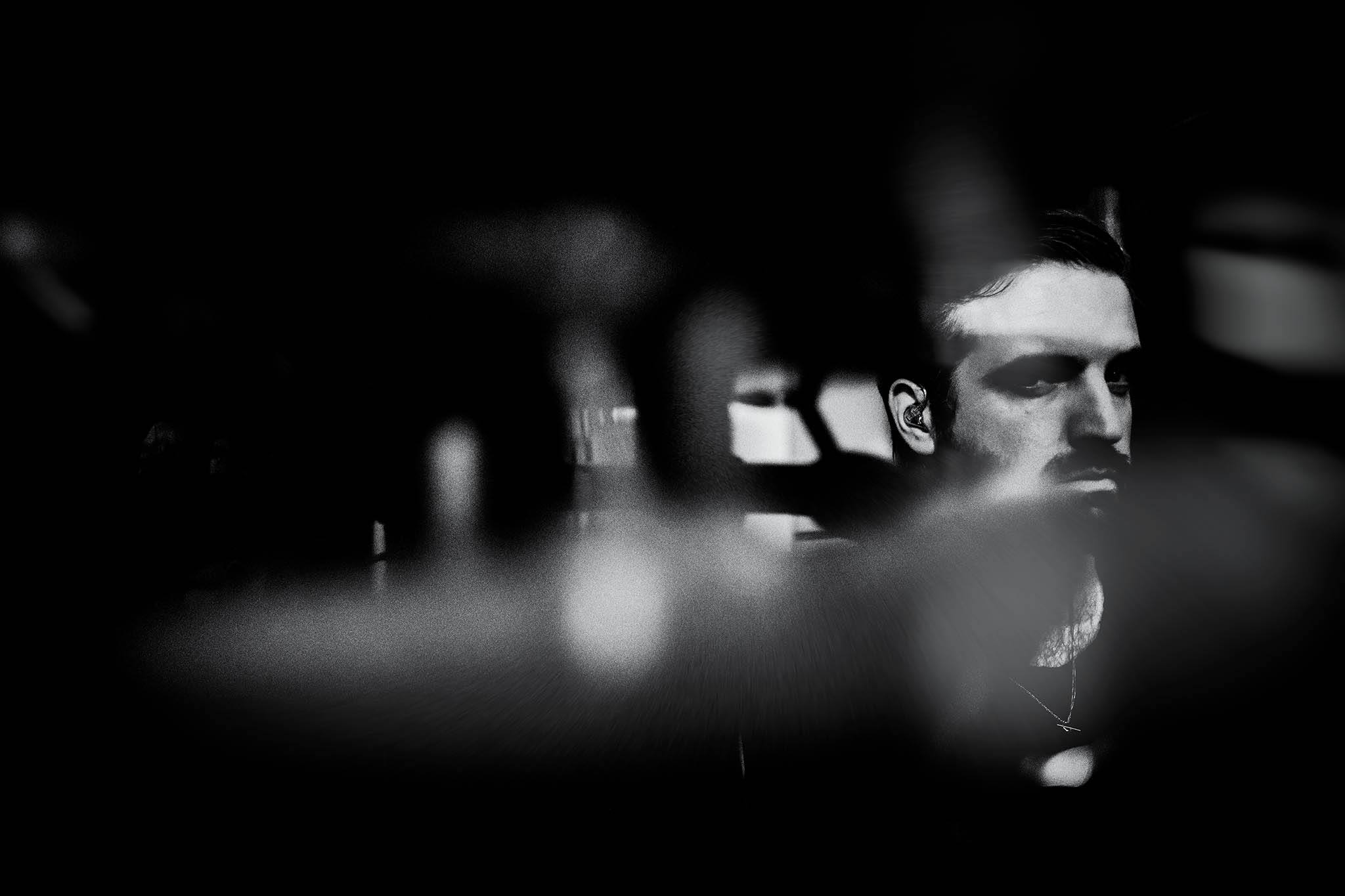
Casper Starreveld

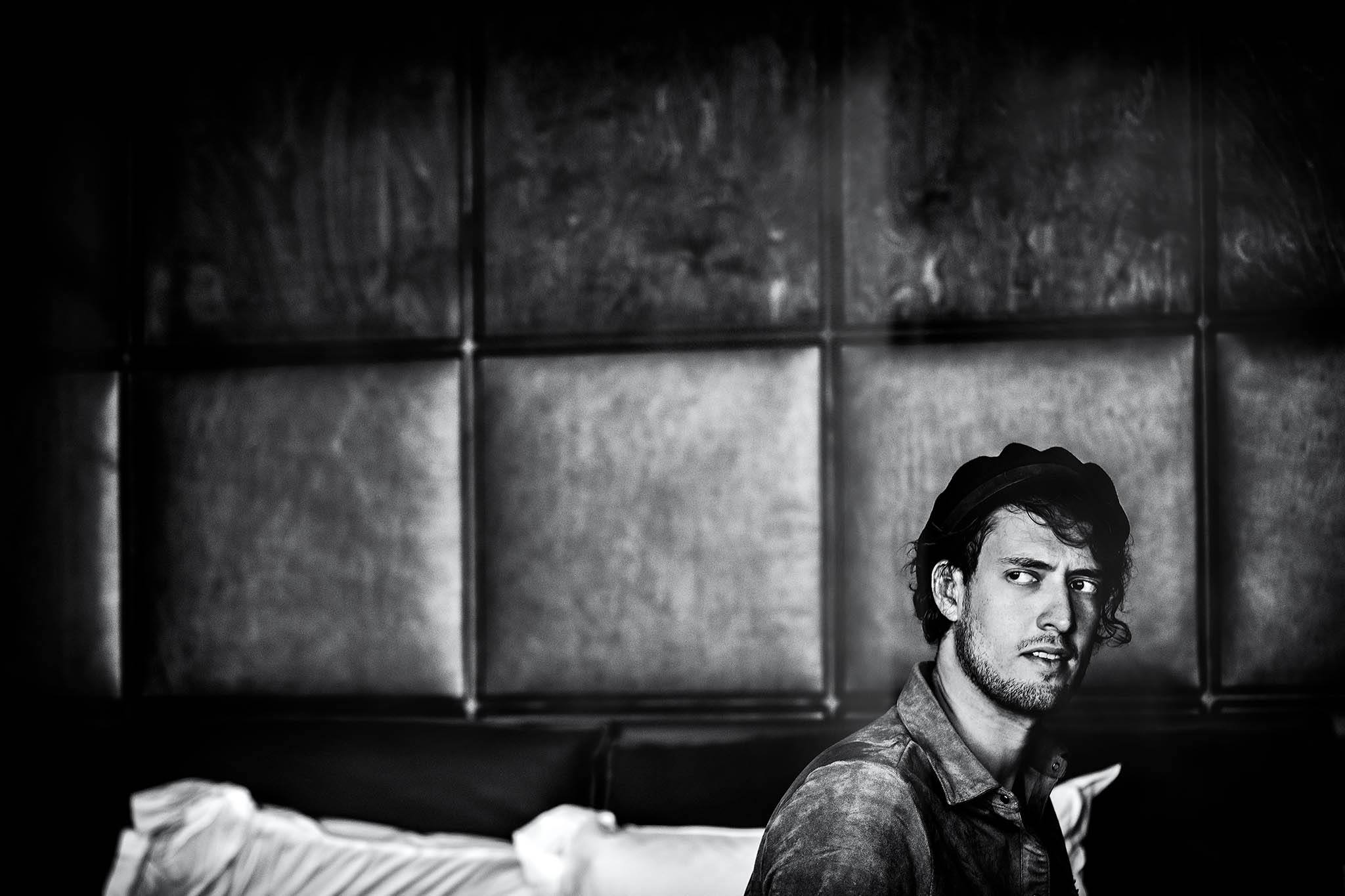
Eloi Youssef

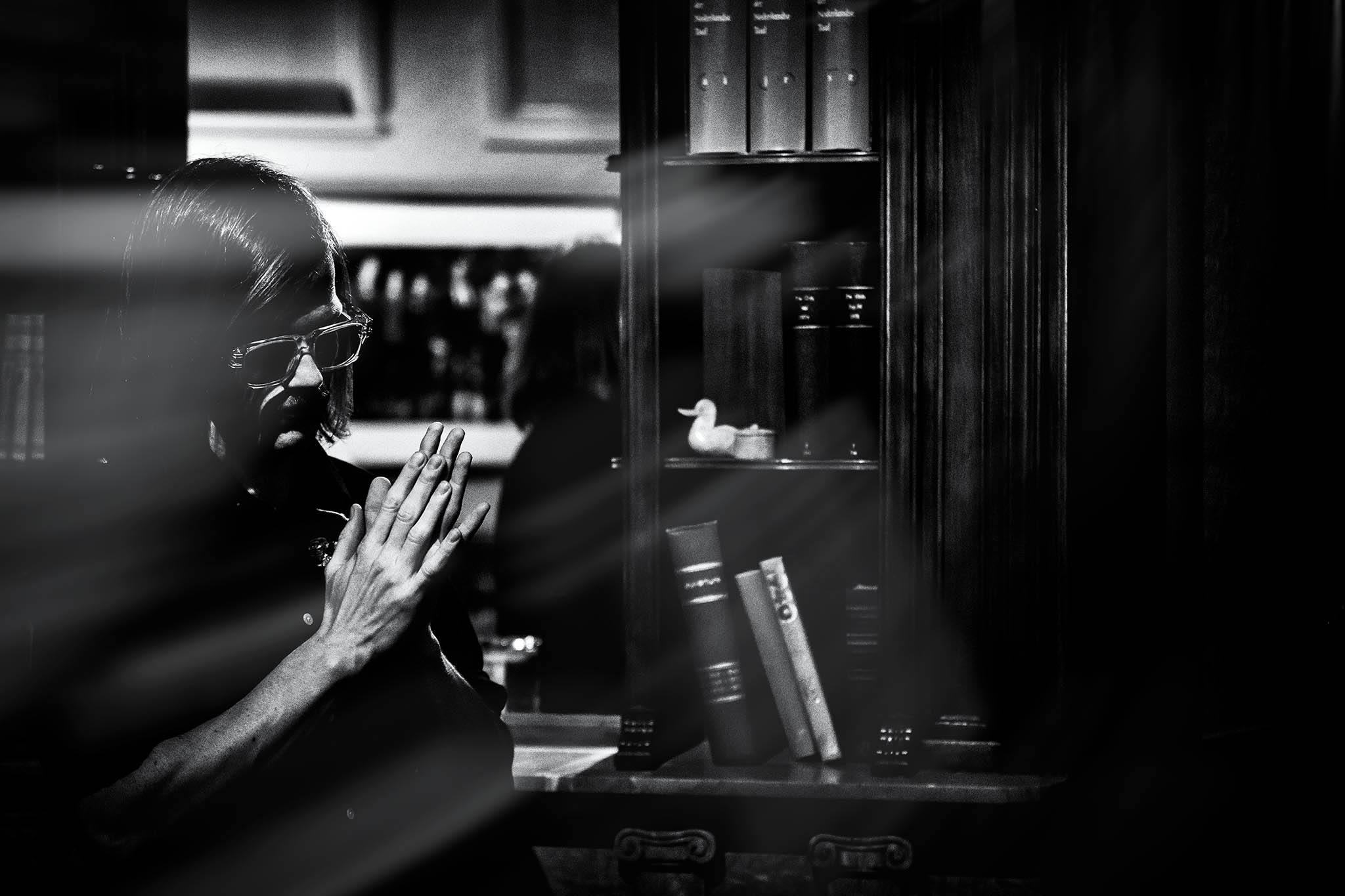
Jan Haker

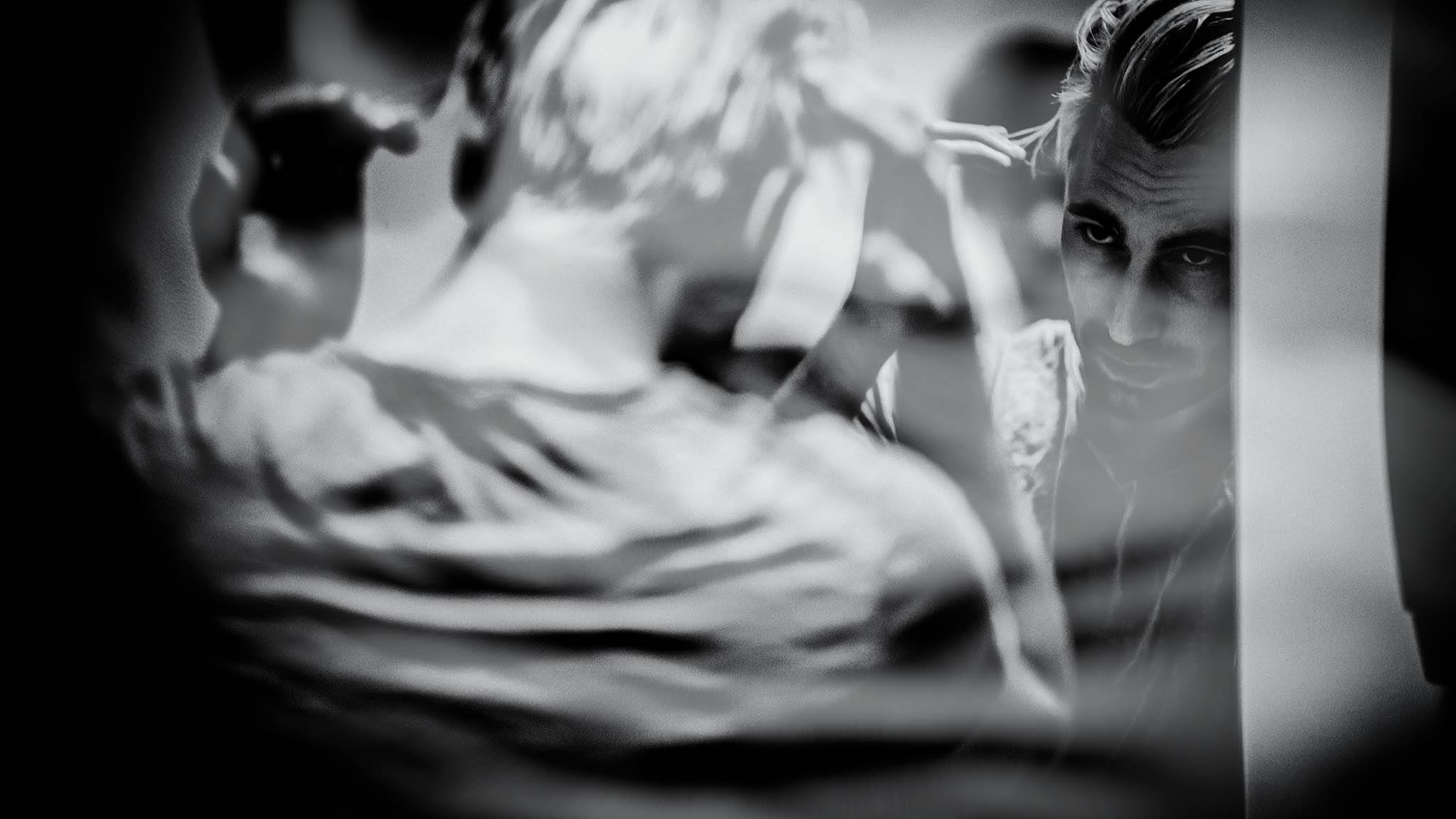
Niles Vandenberg

=== Borders (2009–2011) ===
In the summer of 2009, Kensington traveled to Leeds to start work on their first full-length album with producer James Kenosha, in the studio of Kaiser Chiefs' keyboardist Nick Baines. The album, titled Borders, came out on 17 July 2010. It was mastered by John Davis, who also worked with Arctic Monkeys. The first single, "Youth", received regular airplay on 3FM, MTV and TMF, and entered the Dutch Single Top 100 chart at number 78. With the album, Eloi Youssef became the band's lead vocalist after previously splitting duties with guitarist Casper Starreveld, who retreated to backing vocals. In 2010, Kensington earned support slots opening for Razorlight, My Chemical Romance and The Wombats for those bands' Dutch shows.

In February 2011, Kensington embarked on their first headlining tour, the No Borders Tour, which sold out venues such as Paradiso in Amsterdam, TivoliVredenburg in Utrecht and Rotown in Rotterdam. The single "Let Go" came out in March 2011 and was added to a re-release of Borders. That summer, Kink FM listeners voted Kensington as the National Festival Ambassador of 2011, helping them play Serbia's EXIT Festival and Indonesia's Java Rockin'land. In Indonesia, Kensington also played at the Erasmushuis, the Dutch cultural centre in Jakarta. On 11 October 2011, Borders was released in the U.S. and Canada through Zip Records, an indie record label from San Francisco. In November 2011, the band was invited to New York City to promote Borders, playing a show at the Manhattan music venue The Cutting Room.

=== Vultures (2012–2013) ===
On 25 October 2011, the band released "We Are the Young", the lead single to the band's second album Vultures. The band postponed a scheduled 2012 tour until April to continue working on the album, but it could not be released before the start of the tour, so they test-ran the new material at a series of sold-out club shows. After the album was finished, Universal Music Group expressed interest in releasing it. At this point, Borders had only sold a thousand copies, so the band was struggling financially and had to pay for the recording of Vultures themselves, and they had to pay an additional fee to buy out their previous contract with EMI. To do so, guitarist Casper Starreveld said the band borrowed money from his mother. The second single "Send Me Away" was released on 6 April 2012. Vultures was released on 11 May 2012. The album was recorded in Berlin, mixed by Cenzo Townshend (U2, Editors) in London and mastered in New York City.

Kensington received two nominations at the 2012 3FM Awards in the categories "Serious Talent Award", which is awarded by a jury, and "Best Artist Rock", which is based on fan votes. An international version of Vultures was released on 11 January 2013 by Universal in Germany, Belgium, Austria, Switzerland and South Korea. It included a new song "Home Again", which was featured in a commercial for German ski clothing brand Jack Wolfskin.

Kensington continued to tour in 2013, opening for Two Door Cinema Club and Kane and playing festivals such as Pinkpop Festival and Sziget Festival. They released the song "It Doesn't Have to Hurt" as a free download on their Bandcamp site. The band won three 3FM Awards, for Best Album, Best Live Act and 3FM Talent Award. In October, they won the MTV Europe Music Award (EMA) for Best Dutch Act, defeating Afrojack, Armin van Buuren, Nicky Romero and Nielson.

=== Rivals (2014–2015) ===
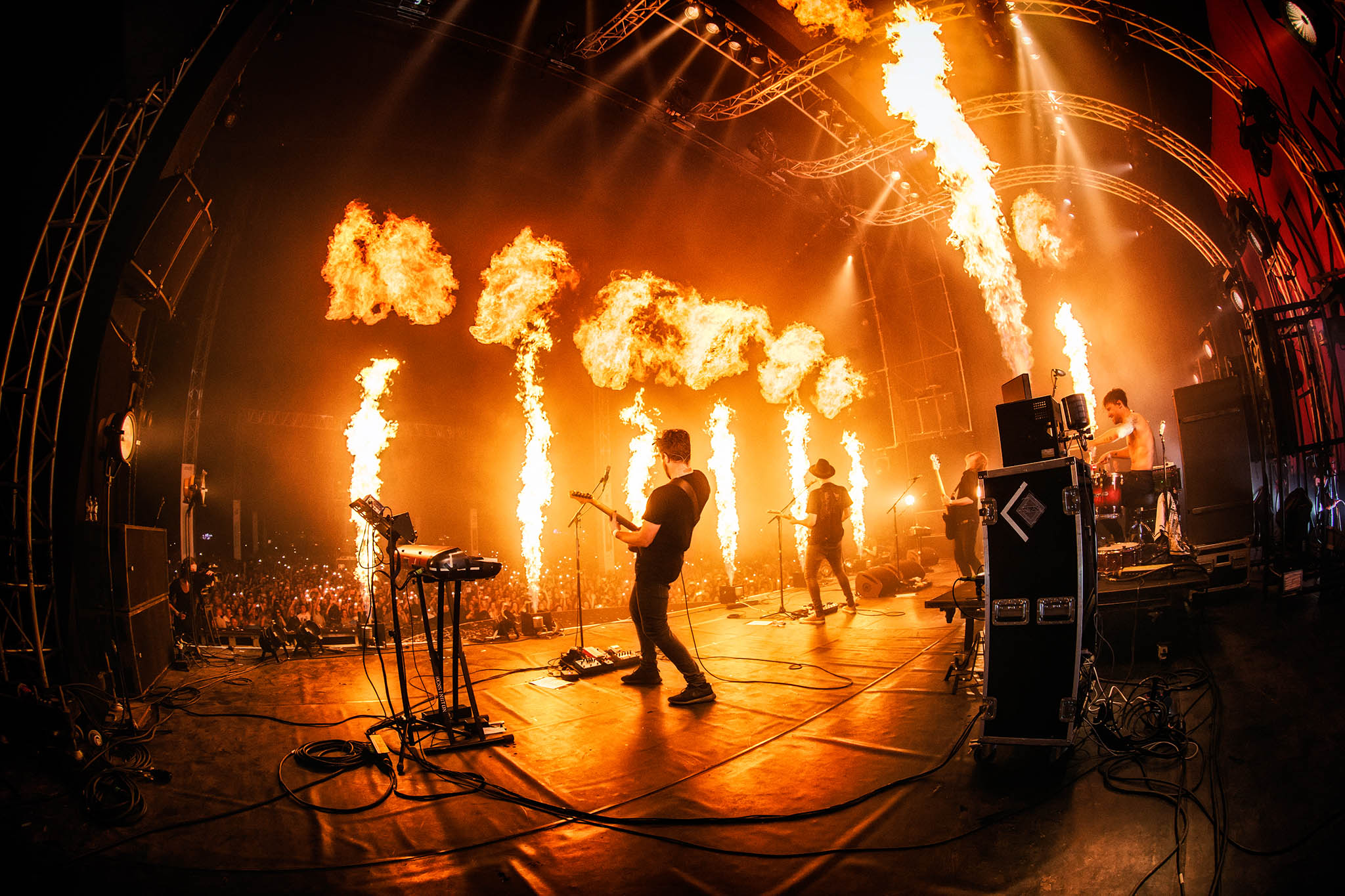
Kensington at Appelpop 2015

The band's third album Rivals was released on 8 August 2014. It became their first number-one album on the Dutch Albums Chart and was preceded by the singles "Streets" and "All for Nothing". The band played their largest concert to date at the Heineken Music Hall in Amsterdam on 20 February 2015, which sold out tickets within ten days. Before that show happened, Kensington announced a concert at the 17,000-capacity Ziggo Dome in Amsterdam on 26 November 2015. It sold out in 11 hours, so the band added a second show for 25 November, which also sold out. In February 2015, the album's third single "War" became Kensington's first top ten hit on the Dutch Top 40; it peaked at No. 7. Rivals was certified Platinum in the Netherlands in March 2015 for selling over 40,000 copies, the band's first certified record.

Kensington also made the soundtrack for the film Reckless (Dutch title: Bloedlink), which premiered in September 2014. Kensington won its second and third consecutive MTV EMA for Best Dutch Act in 2014 and 2015.

In 2015, Kensington collaborated with DJ Armin van Buuren for the song "Heading Up High", which was featured on his album Embrace. A music video for the song was filmed in the Koepelgevangenis in Breda.

=== Control and Time (2016–2019) ===
On 28 October 2016, Kensington released their fourth album, Control. It was certified Gold in the Netherlands solely off of pre-order sales. The lead single from the album, "Do I Ever", came out on 1 September. The album was recorded in Ennio Morricone's studio in Rome. Frontman Eloi Youssef unexpectedly learned in 2015 that his ex-girlfriend was pregnant with his child, and this informed several songs on the album. The second single "Sorry" was released on 1 November 2016 and the third single "Bridges" was released on 10 March 2017. "Sorry", which Youssef said is an "anti-love song", quickly became one of the band's most popular songs.

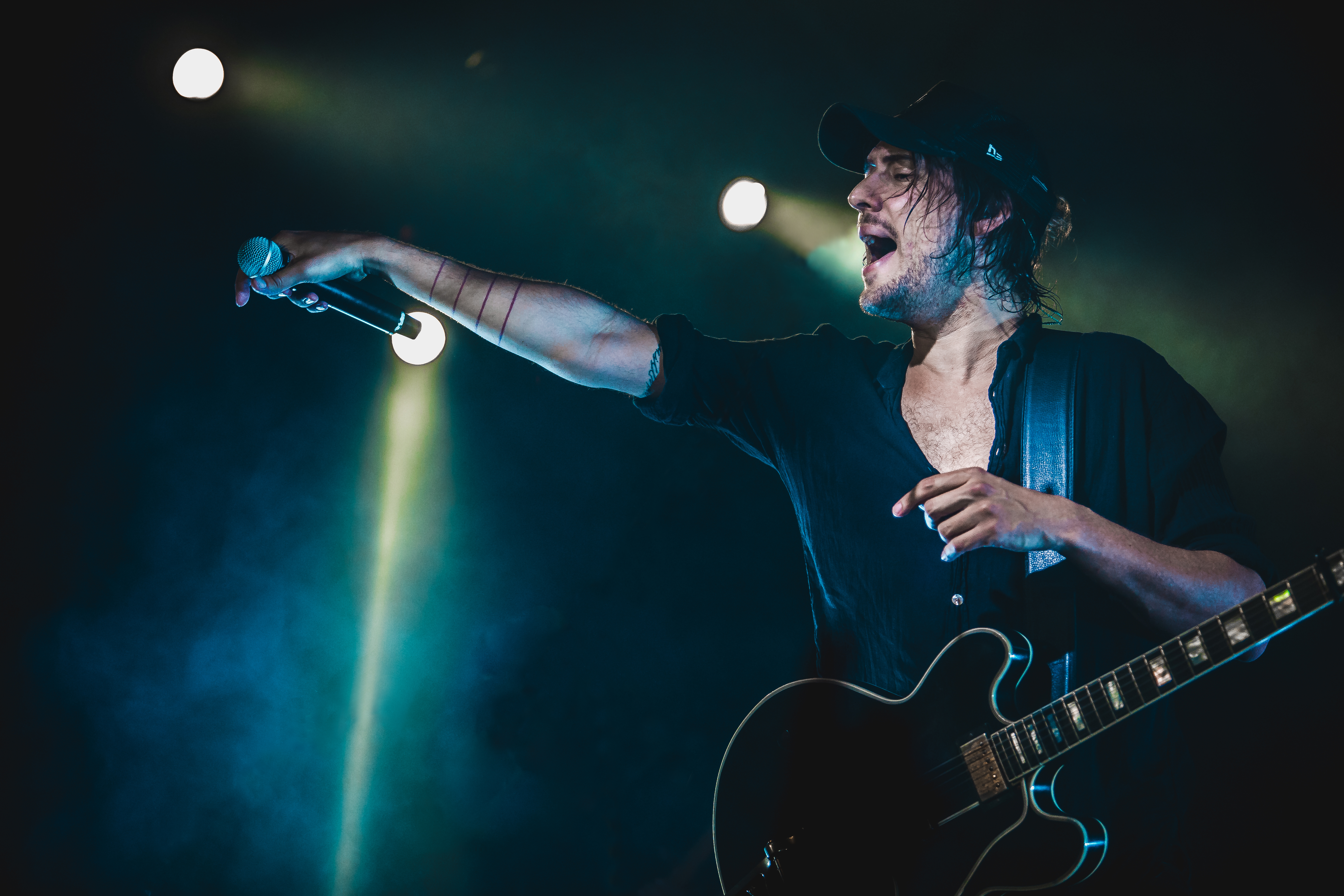
Youssef with Kensington in 2018

The band won the 2017 Popprijs and was presented with the award at Eurosonic Noorderslag in January 2018. On 27 April 2018, Kensington performed "Do I Ever" on Koningsdag for the Dutch royal family in Groningen.

On 14 July 2018, Kensington sold out the Johan Cruyff Arena in Amsterdam. With ticket sales at 51,000, it became the largest rock concert by a Dutch band in the nation's history. The band chose Di-rect to open for them. The show was announced in September 2017, and was leaked early because a poster at a bus stop went up before scheduled.

The band's fifth album, Time, was released on 15 November 2019 and became their third consecutive number-one album in the Netherlands. Its lead single, "Bats", came out in May, followed by "What Lies Ahead" in August. The band worked on the album in Vancouver. The album's third single "Uncharted" became the band's second top ten single on the Dutch Top 40, peaking at No. 10 in February 2020. It was written by guitarist Casper Starreveld about the death of his friend's brother, who drowned in an Amsterdam canal.

=== Youssef's departure (2021–2024) ===
On 12 November 2021, the band announced that lead singer Eloi Youssef would leave the band after two final shows in 2022 due to creative differences. The band released a statement saying: "There is no argument or disagreement, but a difference in vision of the future. Jan, Casper and Niles still want to dedicate their lives to the band, Eloi no longer wants this." Youssef later revealed that he first told this to the other band members two years ago while at an airport in France.

Kensington released a live album, Unplugged (Live), on 26 November 2021. Their greatest hits album was released on 26 August 2022. The band said, "This is our last release in this formation and a celebration of everything we have created together over the past seventeen years." Greatest Hits became Kensington's fourth number-one album on the Dutch Albums Chart.

Due to demand, Kensington eventually added six farewell concerts for Youssef at the Ziggo Dome, which all sold out. They took place from 27 August to 4 September 2022.

In April 2024, Youssef announced his first solo tour, accompanied by the Kamerata Zuid orchestra, set to begin in March 2025.

=== Introduction of Jason Dowd and First Rodeo (2025–present) ===
In January 2025, Kensington posted "It's been a moment..." on Instagram, followed by "We're back". On 16 January 2025, Kensington officially announced American singer Jason Dowd as the band's new lead vocalist and released their first single with him, "A Moment", also performing it inside the Ziggo Dome.

In August 2025, the band announced their sixth full-length studio album entitled First Rodeo, which is released on 28 November 2025, and included the previously released singles, "A Moment", "I Could Be Wrong", "Little by Little", "Safe Haven" and "Stay". The album entered at number one in the Dutch Album Top 100 upon release.

The band performed three times in a row in a sold-out Ziggo Dome in Amsterdam, and announced a return to the Ziggo Dome in 2026.

In February, the band embarked on a tour through France, Switzerland, Austria, Hungary, Czech Republic, Poland and Germany.

In March 2026, Kensington received an Edison Award in the 'Rock' category for First Rodeo.

== Reception ==
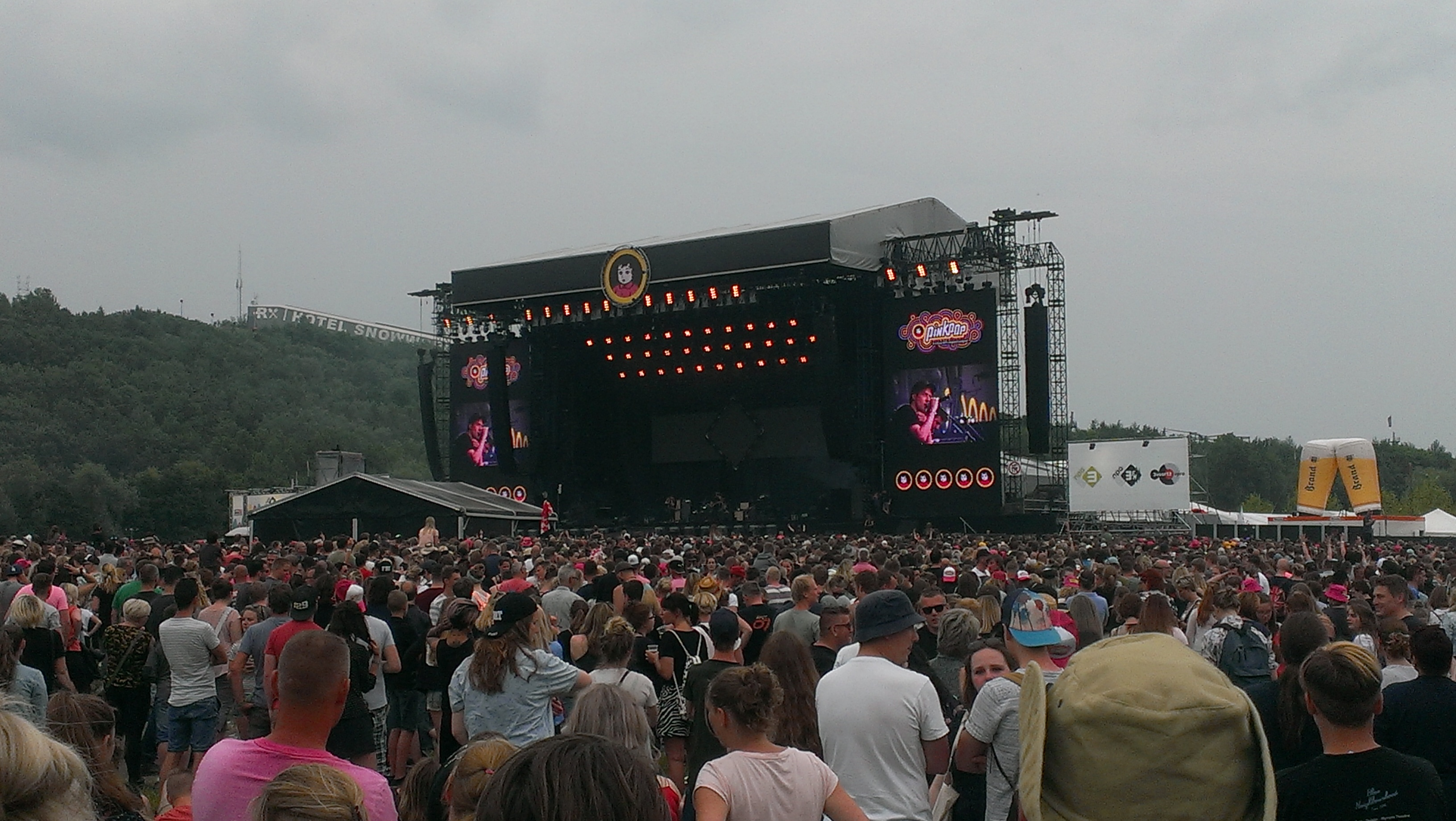
Kensington at 2017 Pinkpop Festival

In 2023, De Volkskrant named Kensington "the most successful Dutch rock band of the last fifteen years" and also called them the Ziggo Dome's "house band", for selling out the arena 19 consecutive times from 2015 to 2022. The paper said that Kensington's most impressive commercial achievement is their ticket sales; the band first played local Utrecht venues before ascending to the festival circuit of Pinkpop, Lowlands and Noorderslag in 2013 and 2014 and then conquering Amsterdam at the arena level. On 14 July 2018, Kensington sold out the Johan Cruyff Arena in Amsterdam – the largest venue in the country, selling 51,000 tickets in what became the largest-ever rock concert by a Dutch band.

Kensington's music has been described as pop rock and arena rock.

Like their commercially successful Dutch mainstream rock predecessors BLØF and Kane, Kensington has also been criticised for their music, specifically their overuse of "whoo-hoo" melodies and "arm-waving songs". In 2016, the Belgian magazine Humo compared a Kensington song to "a pre-packaged slice of cheddar cheese: wrapped in plastic, unnaturally shiny and an imitation of the real stuff." In a negative review of the band's fourth album Control, De Volkskrant wrote that "The band presents a grand, bloated sound with little substance." NU.nl said in 2018 that even compared to other criticised Dutch musicians, "antipathy towards Kensington seems to be on a different level."

Former lead singer Eloi Youssef poked fun at the backlash, describing Kensington's music as "our Lion King sound." Guitarist Casper Starreveld said that "it suits us, our ambition and our taste."

== Band members ==
Current
- Jason Dowd – lead vocals (2025–present)
- Casper Starreveld – guitar, keys (2005–present), backing vocals (2010–present), lead/co-lead vocals (2005–2010)
- Jan Haker – bass guitar, keys, backing vocals (2005–present)
- Niels Vandenberg – drums (2008–present)

Former

- Lucas Lenselink – drums (2005–2008)
- Eloi Youssef – lead vocals, guitar, keys (2006–2022)

Timeline

== Discography ==
=== Albums ===
==== Studio albums ====
List of studio albums, with selected chart positions and certifications
Title	Details	Peak chart positions			Certifications
Title	Details	NLD	BEL (FL)	SWI	Certifications
Borders [nl]	Released: 16 July 2010; Label: Bladehammer/EMI; Formats: CD, LP, digital download, streaming	67	—	—	
Vultures [nl]	Released: 11 May 2012; Label: Universal; Formats: CD, LP, digital download, streaming	6	—	—	NVPI: Gold
Rivals	Released: 8 August 2014; Label: Universal; Formats: CD, LP, digital download, streaming	1	30	—	NVPI: Platinum
Control	Released: 28 October 2016; Label: Universal; Formats: CD, LP, digital download, streaming	1	26	—	NVPI: 3× Platinum
Time	Released: 15 November 2019; Label: Universal; Formats: CD, LP, digital download, streaming	1	34	66	NVPI: Platinum
First Rodeo	Released: 28 November 2025; Label: Universal; Formats: CD, LP, digital download, streaming	1	188	—	
"—" denotes a recording that did not chart or was not released in that territory.

==== Live albums ====
List of live albums, with selected chart positions
Title	Details	Peak chart positions
Title	Details	NLD
Live at the Johan Cruijff Arena 2018	Released: 4 October 2018; Label: Universal; Formats: promo CD	—
Unplugged (Live)	Released: 26 November 2021; Label: Universal; Formats: CD, LP, digital download, streaming	4
"—" denotes a recording that did not chart or was not released in that territory.

==== Compilation albums ====
List of compilation albums, with selected chart positions
Title	Details	Peak chart positions
Title	Details	NLD
Greatest Hits	Released: 26 August 2022; Label: Universal; Formats: CD, LP, digital download, streaming	1

=== EPs ===
- An Introduction To... (nl) (2006)
- Kensington (nl) (2007)
- Youth (nl) (2008)

=== Singles ===
==== As lead artist ====
List of singles as lead artist, with selected chart positions and certifications, showing year released and album name
Title	Year	Peak chart positions				Certifications	Album
Title	Year	NLD Dutch Top 40	NLD Single Top 100	BEL (FL)	BEL (WA)	Certifications	Album
"Youth"	2010	—	78	—	—		Borders
"When It All Falls Down"	2011	—	—	—	—		Borders
"Let Go"	2011	—	74	—	—		Borders
"We Are the Young"	2011	—	—	—	—		Vultures
"Send Me Away"	2012	—	—	—	—		Vultures
"No Way Out"	2012	—	—	—	—		Vultures
"Don't Look Back"	2012	—	—	—	—		Vultures
"Home Again"	2013	33	40	63	—	NVPI: Platinum	Vultures
"Ghosts"	2013	—	—	—	—		Vultures
"Streets"	2014	22	19	52	—	NVPI: Platinum	Rivals
"All for Nothing"	2014	35	51	47	—		Rivals
"War"	2014	7	13	54	81	NVPI: 3× Platinum	Rivals
"Riddles"	2015	23	51	58	—	NVPI: Gold	Rivals
"Done with It"	2015	19	57	—	—		Rivals
"Do I Ever"	2016	14	31	75	—		Control
"Sorry"	2016	15	26	—	—		Control
"Bridges"	2017	30	—	—	—		Control
"Fiji"	2017	31	97	—	—		Control
"Slicer"	2018	—	—	—	—		Control
"Bats"	2019	33	—	—	—		Time
"What Lies Ahead"	2019	23	76	—	—		Time
"Uncharted"	2019	10	31	—	—		Time
"Island"	2019	—	—	—	—		Time
"A Moment"	2025	19	53	—	—		First Rodeo
"I Could Be Wrong"	2025	—	—	—	—		First Rodeo
"Little by Little"	2025	—	—	—	—		First Rodeo
"Safe Haven"	2025	—	—	—	—		First Rodeo
"Stay"	2025	14	—	—	—		First Rodeo
"Call You Home"	2025	—	—	—	—		First Rodeo
"Livin' For"	2026	—	—	—	—		First Rodeo
"Carry On"	2026	—	— (Note: "Carry On" did not enter the Dutch Single Top 100, but peaked at number 26 on the Dutch Single Tip chart.)	—	—		Non-album single
"—" denotes a single that did not chart or was not released in that territory.

==== As featured artist ====
List of singles as featured artist, with selected chart positions and certifications, showing year released and album name
Title	Year	Peak chart positions		Certifications	Album
Title	Year	NLD Dutch Top 40	NLD Single Top 100	Certifications	Album
"Heading Up High" (Armin van Buuren featuring Kensington)	2016	12	40	NVPI: Platinum	Embrace
