= Strong Ones =

Single by Armin van Buuren featuring Cimo Fränkel

from the album Embrace
- Released: 16 October 2015
- Recorded: Armada Studios, Amsterdam
- Genre: Progressive house
- Length: 3:08 (radio edit); 4:55 (extended mix)
- Label: Armind; Armada
- Songwriter(s): Armin van Buuren; Benno de Goeij; Cimo Fränkel; Andreas Moe; Sebastian Thott
- Producer(s): Armin van Buuren; Benno de Goeij

Armin van Buuren singles chronology
"Off the Hook" (2015)	"Strong Ones" (2015)	"Heading Up High" (2016)

Cimo Fränkel singles chronology
"Here I Stand" (2015)	"Strong Ones" (2015)	"Back to 94" (2016)

"Strong Ones" is a song by Dutch disc jockey and record producer Armin van Buuren. It features vocals from Dutch singer and songwriter Cimo Fränkel. The track was released in the Netherlands by Armind as a digital download on 16 October 2015 as the third single from van Buuren's sixth album Embrace.

== Reception ==
According to Tim Olsson from webmedia We Rave You, "The brilliant vocals by Cimo Fränkel really stand out in the mixture combined of guitar sounds and the incredible progressive melody and production work of Armin van Buuren."

== Music video ==
A music video to accompany the release of "Strong Ones" was first released onto YouTube on 23 October 2015. The music video was shot in Portugal.

== Track listing ==
- Netherlands Digital download (ARMD1250)
1. "Strong Ones" (Extended Mix) – 4:55
- Netherlands Digital download (ARMD1250A)
1. "Strong Ones" – 3:08
2. "Strong Ones" (Extended Mix) – 4:55
- Netherlands Digital download - Remixes (ARMD1251)
1. "Strong Ones" (Dave Winnel Remix) – 5:22
2. "Strong Ones" (Deem Remix) – 4:35
3. "Strong Ones" (Möwe Remix) - 5:35
- Netherlands Digital download - Remixes Part II (ARMD1258)
1. "Strong Ones" (Jase Thirlwall Remix) – 7:30
2. "Strong Ones" (Le Visiteur & My Oh My Mix) – 5:55

== Charts ==
Chart (2015)	Peak position
Belgium (Ultratip Bubbling Under Flanders)	23
Netherlands (Single Top 100)	59
US Dance/Mix Show Airplay (Billboard)	24
