= Appelpop =

Pop music festival in Tiel, Netherlands

Coordinates: 51°53′9.03″N 5°26′28.22″E

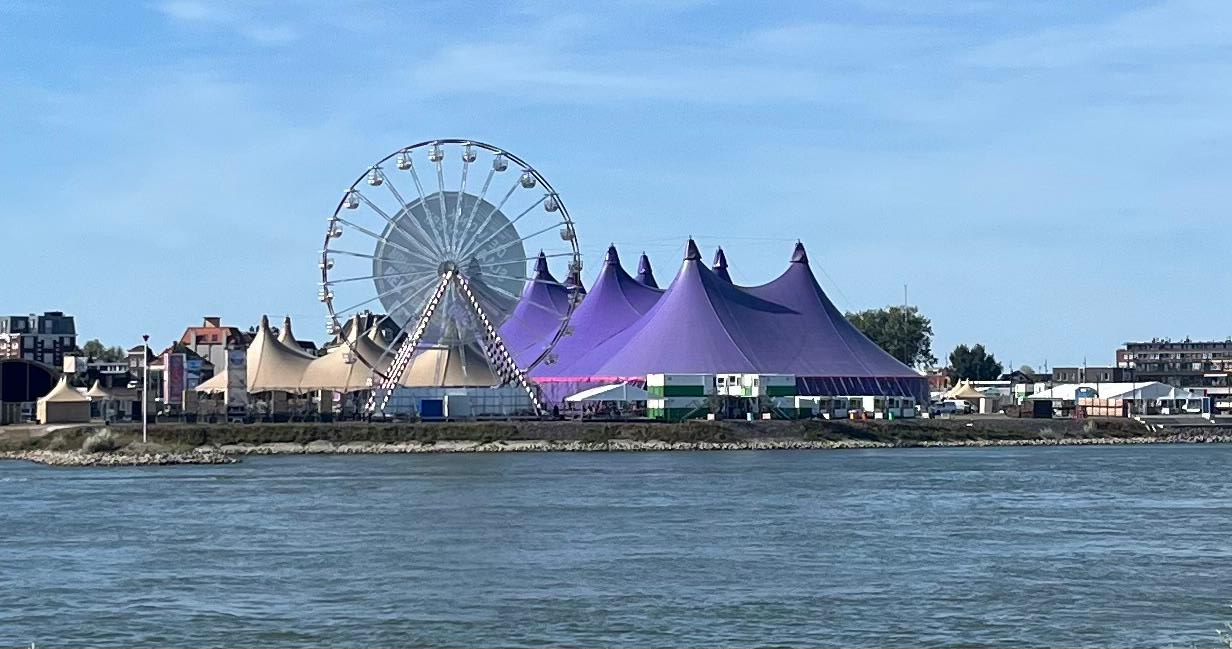
- Appelpop seen from the Waal in 2025
- Genre: mixed
- Dates: Second weekend in September
- Locations: Tiel, Netherlands
- Years active: 1992–present
- Attendance: 160,000
- Website: www.appelpop.nl

Appelpop is a two-day annual pop music festival in Tiel, in Gelderland, Netherlands, that is held in the second weekend of September.

The festival was inaugurated in 1992, and is hosted by the river Waal. It is the largest free multi-day festivals in the Netherlands, attracting over 160,000 visitors, and one of the best-known events in Tiel.

Every year, Appelpop attracts acts from the Netherlands. For example, VanVelzen, Bløf, Caro Emerald, Blaudzun, Nielson, Jett Rebel, Kensington, DeWolff, Typhoon, Kraantje Pappie, De Staat, Skip&Die, Di-rect, Thomas Azier, Dotan, Chef'Special, John Coffey, Racoon, and Golden Earring.

The festival is characterized by its diverse programming: spread across four stages, it features pop artists, alternative music, and emerging (regional) bands. Two stages offer opportunities for dancing.

== History ==
What once started as an extra during the Fruitcorso in 1992 grew into a professional, independent festival with national fame. From 2014, the Fruitcorso takes place in the fourth weekend of September, Appelpop continued to program in the second weekend of September.

The mega tent, used as the main stage, was introduced in 1999. In the 2001 edition, Appelpop attracted an estimated 30,000 visitors spread over two days. In 2009, the tent of the second stage was replaced by an open-air stage to allow more visitors to see the stage. In 2009, thanks in part to a larger terrain and better layout, approximately 170,000 visitors were counted.

In 2020 and 2021, Appelpop did not take place, as a result of the corona pandemic. In 2022, the line-up consisted entirely of Dutch acts to give new talents plenty of space. In 2025, the site layout was adjusted again, including a larger main stage tent, a Ferris wheel, Waal terrace and a tasting garden where visitors could enjoy various drinks and dishes.
