= Time (Kensington album) =

Studio album by Kensington
- Released: 15 November 2019
- Recorded: March–May 2019
- Studios: The Farm Studios, Sunshine Coast, B.C., Canada
- Genres: Alternative rock; indie rock; pop rock
- Length: 42:32
- Label: Universal
- Producers: Kensington; Garth Richardson

Kensington chronology
Control (2016)	Time (2019)	Unplugged (Live) (2021)

Singles from Time
- 1. "Bats" Released: 24 May 2019; 2. "What Lies Ahead" Released: 30 August 2019; 3. "Uncharted" Released: 8 November 2019; 4. "Island" Released: 2019

Time is the fifth studio album by the Dutch rock band Kensington. It was released on 15 November 2019 by Universal Music.

== Recording ==
Time was recorded at the Farm Studios in British Columbia, Canada, owned by producer Garth Richardson, who also acted as the album's producer. It was mastered by Bob Ludwig and mixed by Andy Wallace.

== Track listing ==
All tracks are written by Casper Starreveld, Eloi Youssef, Jan Haker, and Niles Vandenberg.

No.	Title	Length
1.	"Bats"	3:34
2.	"What Lies Ahead"	3:24
3.	"Insane"	3:51
4.	"Uncharted"	4:01
5.	"Part of Me"	3:45
6.	"Chronos, Pt. 1"	3:03
7.	"Chronos, Pt. 2"	1:19
8.	"Island"	4:36
9.	"Ten Times the Weight"	4:18
10.	"Perfect Family Day"	4:31
11.	"No Me"	6:04

== Personnel ==
Credits adapted from official liner notes and Tidal.

=== Kensington ===
- Casper Starreveld – guitar, keyboards, vocals, programming
- Eloi Youssef – vocals, guitar
- Jan Haker – bass
- Niles Vandenberg – drums, percussion

=== Additional musicians ===
- Michael Creber – piano (track 6)

=== Technical ===
- Kensington – production
- Garth Richardson – production
- Brian Montgomery – engineering (tracks 2–11)
- David Schiffman – engineering (track 6)
- Jorge Tavares – engineering (track 1)
- Karl Dicaire – engineering (tracks 1–5, 7–11)
- Ben Searles – engineering assistance (tracks 1–5, 7–11)
- Spencer Bleasdale – engineering assistance (track 6)
- Chris Crippin – drum technician (track 6)
- Paul Iverson – guitar technician (tracks 1–5, 7–11)
- Cedric Muyres – management
- Bob Ludwig – mastering
- Andy Wallace – mixing
- Rahi Rezvani – artwork, photography

== Charts ==
=== Weekly charts ===
Chart (2019–2022)	Peak position
Dutch Albums (Album Top 100)	1
Belgian Albums (Ultratop Flanders)	34
Swiss Albums (Schweizer Hitparade)	66

=== Year-end charts ===
Chart (2019)	Position
Dutch Albums (Album Top 100)	16
Chart (2020)	Position
Dutch Albums (Album Top 100)	37
Chart (2022)	Position
Dutch Albums (Album Top 100)	88

== Certifications ==
Region	Certification	Certified units/sales
Netherlands (NVPI)	Platinum	40,000^{‡}
^{‡} Sales+streaming figures based on certification alone.
