= Lesser Men =

Studio album by Abel
- Released: October 19, 2010
- Genre: alternative rock, indie rock, soul
- Length: 34:36
- Label: Come&Live!

Abel chronology
| The Honest Love (2009) | Lesser Men (2010) | Make It Right (2012) |

Lesser Men is the first studio album from Abel. Come&Live! Records released the album on October 19, 2010.

== Critical reception ==
Professional ratings
Review scores
| Source | Rating |
|---|---|
| CM Addict | 4.5/5 stars |
| Cross Rhythms | 6/10 squares |
| HM Magazine | 3.5/5 stars |
| Indie Vision Music | 4/5 stars |
| Jesus Freak Hideout | 4.5/5 stars |
| Louder Than the Music | 3.5/5 stars |

Awarding the album three and a half stars from HM, Ian Harvey states, "Abel has skillfully navigated their music between the words of the deeply spiritual and artistic ... While some of the melodies feel out of place at times, this is a strong sophomore effort by a talented band." Peter John Willoughby, rating the album a six out of ten at Cross Rhythms, says, "this release is all about spiritual soul-searching and could almost be classified as a worship album." Giving the album four and a half stars for Jesus Freak Hideout, Scott Fryberger writes, "To record nine new songs for an album that they won't make any profit on is a testimony to their dedication to spreading the message of the Gospel through their honest and beautiful music". Shawn H., awarding the album four stars by Indie Vision Music, describes, "They bring vibrantly powerful & strong lyrical presence." Rating the album three and a half stars from Louder Than the Music, Jono Davies writes, "with a background of driven indie rock the album is one to be explored." Cara Fisher, giving the album four and a half stars for CM Addict, states, "Lesser Men is one of those rare albums that offers the best of both worlds, great music and uplifting, honest lyrics. This is indie rock at its best."

== Track listing ==
Track listing
| No. | Title | Length |
|---|---|---|
| 1. | "Silver" | 1:33 |
| 2. | "Saints" | 3:40 |
| 3. | "The Martyr" | 3:16 |
| 4. | "Lesser Men" | 4:00 |
| 5. | "Titanic" | 4:26 |
| 6. | "Take Me Home" | 3:36 |
| 7. | "Standing Still" | 3:30 |
| 8. | "Come Ye Weary" | 3:59 |
| 9. | "Atlantic: The Broken Hearted King" | 4:14 |
| 10. | "Atlantic: The Voice in the Tides" | 2:23 |
| Total length: | | 34:36 |
