= Control (Kensington album) =

Studio album by Kensington
- Released: 28 October 2016
- Recorded: March–May 2016
- Studios: Forum Music Village, Rome
- Genres: Alternative rock; indie rock; pop rock
- Length: 40:16
- Label: Universal
- Producers: Kensington; Michael Beinhorn

Kensington chronology
Rivals (2014)	Control (2016)	Time (2019)

Singles from Control
- 1. "Do I Ever" Released: 1 September 2016; 2. "Sorry" Released: 1 November 2016; 3. "Bridges" Released: 10 March 2017; 4. "Fiji" Released: 2017; 5. "Slicer" Released: 2018

Control is the fourth studio album by the Dutch rock band Kensington. It was released on 28 October 2016 by Universal Music.

== Recording ==
The band hired American producer Michael Beinhorn to assist with the recording and production of the album.

== Track listing ==
All tracks are written by Casper Starreveld, Eloi Youssef, Jan Haker and Niles Vandenberg.

No.	Title	Length
1.	"Do I Ever"	3:24
2.	"Fiji"	2:40
3.	"Slicer"	3:15
4.	"Regret"	3:39
5.	"All Before You"	3:39
6.	"Sorry"	3:47
7.	"Control"	4:35
8.	"Rely On"	2:39
9.	"Bridges"	3:40
10.	"Storms"	4:11
11.	"St. Helena"	4:42

== Personnel ==
Credits for Control are adapted from the official liner notes and Tidal.

=== Kensington ===
- Casper Starreveld – guitar, keyboards, vocals, programming (all tracks); piano (6)
- Eloi Youssef – vocals, guitar
- Jan Haker – bass guitar
- Niles Vandenberg – drums

=== Additional musicians ===
- Guillermo Ruiz Chihuán – pan flute (track 3)
- Rossano Baldini – piano (track 9)
- Yvet Youssef – background vocals (track 6)

=== Technical ===
- Kensington – production
- Michael Beinhorn – production
- Davide Palmiotto – engineering
- Fabio Patrignani – engineering
- Jesse Germanó – engineering
- Martin Beusker – engineering assistance
- Nitzan Hoffmann – engineering assistance
- Cedric Muyres – management
- Joe LaPorta – mastering
- Tom Lord-Alge – mixing
- Mare van der Holst – artwork
- Rahi Rezvani – photography

== Charts ==
=== Weekly charts ===
Chart (2016–2021)	Peak position
Dutch Albums (Album Top 100)	1
Belgian Albums (Ultratop Flanders)	26

=== Year-end charts ===
Chart (2016)	Position
Dutch Albums (Album Top 100)	5
Chart (2017)	Position
Dutch Albums (Album Top 100)	5
Chart (2018)	Position
Dutch Albums (Album Top 100)	33
Chart (2019)	Position
Dutch Albums (Album Top 100)	77

== Certifications ==
Region	Certification	Certified units/sales
Netherlands (NVPI)	3× Platinum	120,000^{‡}
^{‡} Sales+streaming figures based on certification alone.
