= The Honest Love =

EP by Abel
- Released: September 1, 2009
- Genre: alternative rock, indie rock, soul
- Length: 23:36
- Label: Dreamt

Abel chronology
The Honest Love (2009)	Lesser Men (2010)

The Honest Love is the first extended play from Abel. Dreamt Records released the EP on September 1, 2009.

== Critical reception ==
Professional ratings
Review scores
Source	Rating
Cross Rhythms	6/10 squares
Indie Vision Music	3/5 stars
Jesus Freak Hideout	3.5/5 stars

Awarding the EP three and a half stars from Jesus Freak Hideout, Timothy Estabrooks writes, "the music is pleasant and the lyrics are strong." Ian Webber, rating the EP six out of ten for Cross Rhythms, states, "Abel have written a collection of tracks that verge on worship music, not unlike Telecast." Giving the EP three stars at Indie Vision Music, Scott.L describes, "Abel’s not gonna blow your mind, but then, they certainly won’t be putting you to sleep either."

== Track listing ==
No.	Title	Length
1.	"Dressed like a King"	3:39
2.	"Song of Simon"	4:43
3.	"The Honest Love"	4:10
4.	"My Melody"	4:48
5.	"The World Sings"	6:06
Total length:		23:36
