= Old Skool (EP) =

EP by Armin van Buuren
- Released: 4 August 2016
- Label: Armada
- Producers: Armin van Buuren; Benno de Goeij

Armin van Buuren chronology
A State of Trance 2016 (2016)	Old Skool (2016)	A State of Trance Ibiza 2016 (2016)

Singles from Old Skool
- 1. "Dominator" Released: 30 June 2016; 2. "The Ultimate Seduction" Released: 14 July 2016; 3. "Pull Over" Released: 30 June 2016

Old Skool is an extended play (EP) by Dutch DJ and record producer Armin van Buuren. It was released on 4 August 2016 by Armada Music. Van Buuren said of the album, "What I miss sometimes in dance music is a little bit of the fun, the fun that we had by experimenting and going out of our way and doing strange things. And that's what I wanted to do with Old Skool".

== Track listing ==
No.	Title	Writer(s)	Length
1.	"Dominator" (Armin van Buuren vs. Human Resource)	Guido Pernet; Jasper Drexhage; Johan van Beek; Larenzo Nash; Robert Mahu	2:29
2.	"The Ultimate Seduction" (Armin van Buuren vs. The Ultimate Seduction)	Koen Groeneveld; Addy van der Zwan	2:14
3.	"Pull Over" (Armin van Buuren vs. Speedy J)	Jochem Paap	2:25
4.	"Quadrophonia" (Armin van Buuren vs. Quadrophonia)	Olivier Abbeloos; Lucien Foort	3:20
5.	"88 to Piano" (Armin van Buuren vs. MainX)	Rene van den Berghe	3:00
6.	"Old Skool" (Vigel remix)	Armin van Buuren; Benno de Goeij; Larry Heard	2:52
7.	"Old Skool Ping Pong"	van Buuren; de Goeij; Heard	2:48

CD version (bonus track)
No.	Title	Length
8.	"Minimix"

Digital download — extended versions
No.	Title	Writer(s)	Length
1.	"Dominator" (Armin van Buuren vs. Human Resource) (extended mix)	Pernet; Drexhage; van Beek; Nash; Mahu	4:22
2.	"The Ultimate Seduction" (Armin van Buuren vs. The Ultimate Seduction) (extended mix)	Groeneveld; van der Zwan	3:56
3.	"Pull Over" (Armin van Buuren vs. Speedy J) (extended mix)	Paap	4:00
4.	"Quadrophonia" (Armin van Buuren vs. Quadrophonia) (extended mix)	Abbeloos; Foort	4:59
5.	"88 to Piano" (Armin van Buuren vs. MainX) (extended mix)	van den Berghe	3:59
6.	"Old Skool" (Vigel remix) (extended mix)	van Buuren; de Goeij; Heard	4:03
7.	"Old Skool Ping Pong" (extended mix)	van Buuren; de Goeij; Heard	5:28

== Charts ==
Chart (2016)	Peak position
Belgian Albums (Ultratop Flanders)	13
Belgian Albums (Ultratop Wallonia)	45
Dutch Albums (Album Top 100)	8
