= Abel (band) =

American rock band

- Origin: Poughkeepsie, New York
- Genres: alternative rock, indie rock, soul
- Years active: 2008–2013
- Labels: Dreamt Music, Come&Live!
- Past members: Kevin Kneifel; Dan Bishop; Alex David; John Rell III
- Website: abeltheband.com

Abel was an American rock band from Poughkeepsie, New York. The band primarily played alternative rock and indie rock music, with soul music influences. The band began making music in 2008, and disbanded in 2013. Membership consisted of vocalist/guitarist Kevin Kneifel, guitarist Dan Bishop, bassist Alex David, and drummer John Rell III. The band released an extended play, The Honest Love, in 2009, through Dreamt Music. Their first studio album, Lesser Men, was released by Come&Live! Records, in 2010. Their final studio album, Make It Right, was released independently in 2012.

== Background ==
Abel was an American rock band from Poughkeepsie, New York. Their members included vocalist/guitarist Kevin Kneifel, guitarist Dan Bishop, bassist Alex David, and drummer John Rell III.

== Music history ==
The band formed in 2008, with their first release, The Honest Love, an extended play, released by Dreamt Music on September 1, 2009. They released a studio album, Lesser Men, on October 19, 2010 with Come&Live Records. Their final studio album, Make It Right, was released independently on September 18, 2012.

== Members ==
Line-up

- Kevin Kneifel - vocals, guitar
- Dan Bishop - guitar
- Alex David - bass
- John Rell III - drums

== Discography ==
Studio albums

- Lesser Men (October 19, 2010, Come&Live!)
- Make It Right (September 18, 2012, Independent)

EPs

- The Honest Love (September 1, 2009, Dreamt Music)
