= Embrace (Armin van Buuren album) =

Studio album by Armin van Buuren
- Released: 29 October 2015
- Recorded: 2015
- Genre: Progressive house; progressive trance; uplifting trance; electro house; techno; pop rock
- Length: 74:28
- Label: Armada
- Producer: Armin van Buuren; Robbert van de Corput; Benno de Goeij; Jan Haker; Joacim Persson; Casper Starreveld; Sebastian Thott; Claus Terhoeven; Niles Vandenberg; Eloi Youssef

Armin van Buuren chronology
A State of Trance Ibiza 2015 at Ushuaïa (2015)	Embrace (2015)	A State of Trance 2016 (2016)

Singles from Embrace
- 1. "Another You" Released: 8 May 2015; 2. "Off the Hook" Released: 14 September 2015; 3. "Strong Ones" Released: 16 October 2015; 4. "Embargo" Released: 22 October 2015; 5. "Hands to Heaven" Released: 26 October 2015; 6. "Heading Up High" Released: 5 February 2016; 7. "Freefall" Released: 11 June 2016; 8. "Make It Right" Released: 18 November 2016

Embrace is the sixth studio album by Dutch DJ and record producer Armin van Buuren. It was released on 29 October 2015 by Armada Music. The album features artists such as Angel Taylor, Cosmic Gate, Gavin DeGraw, Hardwell, Eric Vloeimans and Mr Probz.

== Background ==
Explaining the name of the album, Van Buuren said: "The idea was to 'EMBRACE' several different instruments and sounds, and incorporate them into my sound."

Explaining the album cover, Anton Corbijn said: “I photographed Armin with the idea to modify the public perception of him and of what he is creating. He is such a nice guy, so I worked on giving him a bit more edge visually and created images that hold a mix of references to Sgt. Pepper and Mad Max. Playful stuff basically. Apt for a versatile DJ who adores music and travels the world.”

== Critical reception ==
Professional ratings
Review scores
Source	Rating
We Got This Covered	4/5 stars

John Cameron from We Got This Covered felt that despite Armin van Buuren's status as a "full fledged enterprise", the album still "manages to be genuine at all the moments that count". The critic commented that "discerning trance fan[s] of yesteryear" may ridicule pop-centered tracks like "Another You", but nonetheless agreed that tracks "Make It Right" and "Gotta Be Love" still "allow the euphoric, emotional essence of trance to shine through", while calling the lack of instrumental samples heavily suggested in previous van Buuren interviews as a shortcoming of the album. Krystal Spence of Your EDM wrote that Embrace "opens cinematically like his [van Buuren] previous albums", but quickly "changes pace and sounds" throughout the album, notably with electro-trance track "Off The Hook" whose sound failed to complement with the other 14 record songs. She dubbed "Looking For Your Name" as a "beautiful ballad" produced by an electronic artist, but argued: "Unfortunately, it’s not trance. Most of Embrace isn’t."

== Track listing ==
On 1 October 2015, the list of songs on Embrace was announced in the episode number 733 of van Buuren's radio show A State of Trance.

No.	Title	Writer(s)	Producer(s)	Length
1.	"Embrace" (featuring Eric Vloeimans)	Armin van Buuren; Benno de Goeij; Eric Vloeimans	van Buuren; de Goeij	7:36
2.	"Another You" (featuring Mr Probz)	van Buuren; de Goeij; Dennis Princewell Stehr; Niels Geusebroek	van Buuren; de Goeij	3:10
3.	"Strong Ones" (featuring Cimo Fränkel)	van Buuren; de Goeij; Cimo Fränkel; Sebastian Thott; Andreas Moe	van Buuren; de Goeij; Thott^{[a]}	3:08
4.	"Make It Right" (featuring Angel Taylor)	van Buuren; de Goeij; Geusebroek; Angel Taylor	van Buuren; de Goeij	5:41
5.	"Face of Summer" (featuring Sarah Decourcy)	van Buuren; de Goeij; Han Kooreneef; Daniel Gibson; Levana Wolf; Sarah Decourcy	van Buuren; de Goeij	6:38
6.	"Heading Up High" (featuring Kensington)	van Buuren; de Goeij; Casper Starreveld; Eloi Youssef; Jan Haker; Niles Vandenberg	van Buuren; de Goeij; Starreveld; Youssef; Haker; Vandenberg	3:52
7.	"Gotta Be Love" (featuring Lyrica Anderson)	van Buuren; de Goeij; Joacim Persson; Johan Alkenäs; Niclas Molinder; David Jost	van Buuren; de Goeij; Persson^{[a]}	6:41
8.	"Hands to Heaven" (featuring Rock Mafia)	van Buuren; de Goeij; Tim James; Antonina Armato	van Buuren; de Goeij; Steve Hammons^{[a]}	6:02
9.	"Caught in the Slipstream" (featuring BullySongs)	van Buuren; de Goeij; Andrew Bullimore; Mike Kintish	van Buuren; de Goeij	5:07
10.	"Embargo" (with Cosmic Gate)	van Buuren; de Goeij; Claus Terhoeven	van Buuren; de Goeij; Terhoeven	5:19
11.	"Freefall" (featuring BullySongs)	van Buuren; de Goeij; Bullimore; Kintish	van Buuren; de Goeij	3:19
12.	"Indestructible" (featuring DBX)	van Buuren; de Goeij; Sacha Collisson; Pete Kirtley; John James Newman	van Buuren; de Goeij	3:16
13.	"Old Skool"	van Buuren; de Goeij; Larry Heard	van Buuren; de Goeij	3:56
14.	"Off the Hook" (with Hardwell)	van Buuren; de Goeij; Robbert van de Corput	van Buuren; de Goeij; van de Corput	5:44
15.	"Looking for Your Name" (featuring Gavin DeGraw)	van Buuren; de Goeij; Gavin DeGraw; John Ewbank	van Buuren	4:53
Total length:				74:22

Notes

- ^a signifies a vocal producer
- "Old Skool" contains elements from "Can You Feel It" by Fingers Inc.

== Charts ==
=== Charts ===
Chart (2015)	Peak position
Belgian Albums (Ultratop Flanders)	40
Belgian Albums (Ultratop Wallonia)	53
Canadian Albums (Billboard)	92
Dutch Albums (Album Top 100)	1
German Albums (Offizielle Top 100)	73
Polish Albums (ZPAV)	23
Swiss Albums (Schweizer Hitparade)	82
UK Dance Albums (OCC)	16
US Top Dance Albums (Billboard)	4

=== Year-end charts ===
Chart (2015)	Position
Dutch Albums Chart	32
