= Freefall (Armin van Buuren song) =

Single by Armin van Buuren featuring BullySongs

from the album Embrace
- Released: 11 June 2016
- Recorded: Armada Studios, Amsterdam
- Genre: Progressive house
- Length: 3:52
- Label: Armind; Armada
- Songwriters: Armin van Buuren; Benno de Goeij; Andrew Bullimore; Mike Kintish
- Producers: Armin van Buuren; Benno de Goeij

Armin van Buuren singles chronology
"Heading Up High" (2016)	"Freefall" (2016)	"Make It Right" (2016)

BullySongs singles chronology
"Warriors" (2016)	"Freefall" (2016)	"Walking with Shadows" (2016)

"Freefall" is a song by Dutch disc jockey and record producer Armin van Buuren. It features the British singer-songwriter BullySongs. The track was released in the Netherlands by Armind as a digital download on 11 June 2016 as the fifth single from van Buuren's sixth album Embrace.

The Manse remix of the song was more often played by Armin van Buuren during his shows. This version is also included in van Buuren's compilation A State of Trance 2016.

== Music video ==
A music video to accompany the release of "Freefall" was first premiered on van Buuren's YouTube on 11 June 2016. To film the music video, Armin van Buuren and the Armada Music and Cloud 9 Music staffs from Amsterdam decided to take a helicopter and to drop from the gate to feel a real experience of "Freefall" over North Holland.

== Track listing ==
Netherlands Digital download (ARMAS1148)

1. "Freefall" (Extended Mix) – 4:02
2. "Freefall" (Manse Extended Remix) – 4:26

Netherlands Digital download (ARMAS1148B)

1. "Freefall" (Original Mix) – 3:19
2. "Freefall" (Manse Remix) – 2:33
3. "Freefall" (Extended Mix) – 4:03
4. "Freefall" (Manse Extended Remix) – 4:26

Netherlands Digital download – Heatbeat Remixes (ARMD1270A)

1. "Freefall" (Heatbeat Remix) – 3:38
2. "Freefall" (Heatbeat Extended Remix) – 5:19

== Charts ==
Chart performance for "Freefall"
Chart (2016)	Peak position
Netherlands (Tipparade)	8
US Dance/Mix Show Airplay (Billboard)	40
