= Make It Right (Armin van Buuren song) =

Single by Armin van Buuren featuring Angel Taylor

from the album Embrace
- Released: 11 November 2016
- Recorded: Armada Studios, Amsterdam
- Genre: Uplifting trance
- Length: 3:52
- Label: Armind; Armada
- Songwriters: Armin van Buuren; Benno de Goeij; Angel Taylor; Niels Geusebroek
- Producers: Armin van Buuren; Benno de Goeij

Armin van Buuren singles chronology
"Freefall" (2016)	"Make It Right" (2016)	"Great Spirit" (2016)

Angel Taylor singles chronology
"Lost In You" (2016)	"Make It Right" (2016)	"On My Own" (2017)

"Make It Right" is a song by Dutch disc jockey and record producer Armin van Buuren. It features American singer-songwriter Angel Taylor. The track was released in the Netherlands by Armind as a digital download on 11 November 2016 as the sixth and last single from van Buuren's sixth album Embrace.

== Music video ==
A music video to accompany the release of "Make It Right" was first premiered on Armada Music's YouTube channel on 31 December 2016.

== Track listing ==
- Netherlands Digital download (ARMAS1239)
1. "Make It Right" (Extended Mix) – 6:33
2. "Make It Right" (ilan Bluestone & Maor Levi Extended Remix) – 6:46
3. "Make It Right" (Juicy M Extended Remix) – 3:58
4. "Make It Right" (Morgan Page Extended Remix) – 4:50

Netherlands Digital download (ARMAS1239)

1. "Make It Right" (Original Mix) – 5:42
2. "Make It Right" (ilan Bluestone & Maor Levi Remix) – 3:25
3. "Make It Right" (Juicy M Remix) – 2:58
4. "Make It Right" (Morgan Page Remix) – 3:35
5. "Make It Right" (Extended Mix) – 6:33
6. "Make It Right" (ilan Bluestone & Maor Levi Extended Remix) – 6:46
7. "Make It Right" (Juicy M Extended Remix) – 3:58
8. "Make It Right" (Morgan Page Extended Remix) – ':50

== Charts ==
Chart performance for "Freefall"
Chart (2016)	Peak position
Netherlands (Dutch Top 40)	19
