= Off the Hook (Hardwell and Armin van Buuren song) =

Single by Hardwell and Armin van Buuren

from the album Embrace
- Released: 14 September 2015
- Studio: Armada Studios, Amsterdam
- Genre: Big room trance; trouse
- Length: 5:45
- Label: Revealed; Armada
- Songwriters: Robbert van de Corput; Armin van Buuren; Benno de Goeij
- Producers: Hardwell; Armin van Buuren; Benno de Goeij

Hardwell singles chronology
"Follow Me" (2015)	"Off the Hook" (2015)	"Mad World" (2015)

Armin van Buuren singles chronology
"Stardust" (2015)	"Off the Hook" (2015)	"Strong Ones" (2015)

"Off the Hook" is a song by Dutch DJs and producers Hardwell and Armin van Buuren. It was released on 14 September 2015 in the Netherlands. It is the second single from van Buuren's album Embrace.

== Background ==
It was debuted at the 2015 Ultra Music Festival in March.

== Track listing ==
Digital download
No.	Title	Length
1.	"Off the Hook" (radio edit)	2:57
2.	"Off the Hook"	5:45

== Charts ==
Chart (2015)	Peak position
Belgium (Ultratip Bubbling Under Flanders)	51
