= Make It Right (album) =

2012 studio album by Abel

Studio album by Abel
- Released: September 18, 2012
- Genre: alternative rock, indie rock, soul
- Length: 37:38
- Label: Independent

Abel chronology
Lesser Men (2010)	Make It Right (2012)

Make It Right is the second studio album from Abel. The album was released independently on September 18, 2012.

== Critical reception ==
Professional ratings
Review scores
Source	Rating
Bring the Noise UK	7/10
Christian Music Zine	4.25/5
HM Magazine	3/5 stars
Indie Vision Music	3/5 stars
Jesus Freak Hideout	4.5/5 stars
Mind Equals Blown	9/10
Sputnikmusic	4.5/5 stars
This Is Not a Scene	7.5/10 stars

Awarding the album three stars from HM Magazine, Dan MacIntosh states, "The sound of this music is a reminder that everything can all fall apart, nearly at any moment." Adam Knott, giving the album four and a half stars for Sputnikmusic, writes, "Make It Right which soars and shrinks in a lot of beautiful ways". Giving the album four and a half stars at Jesus Freak Hideout, Scott Fryberger describes, "Make It Right features some of Abel's most honest and, at times, confrontational lyrics thus far." Sara Walz, awarding the album three stars by Indie Vision Music, says, "Make It Right is ambient, rock 'n roll, and a little southern".

Giving the album a seven and a half stars for This Is Not a Scene, Louisa writes, "It is flawlessly put together, and the recording is faultless." Rating the album a seven out of ten at Bring the Noise UK, Sherin Malick says, "Make It Right is perfect second full length from Abel." Awarding the album a nine out of ten from Mind Equals Blown, Tim Dodderidge states, "Make It Right is a visage of memorable, hearty alternative rock ... meshing of vitality, distress, sincerity and controlled rigidness, it seats itself among 2012's best albums." Tyler Hess, giving the album a 4.25 out of five by Christian Music Zine, describes, "Make It Right they definitely deserve a bump up the popularity pole."

== Track listing ==
No.	Title	Length
1.	"I'll Be Waiting"	3:31
2.	"Fire Walk with Me"	4:06
3.	"An Ultimatum"	3:33
4.	"Come Home"	3:26
5.	"Fine Lines"	3:44
6.	"Daughter"	2:57
7.	"A Grief Observed"	4:03
8.	"Fifteen Years"	3:25
9.	"Your Heart, Your Soul"	3:55
10.	"Comfort and Truth"	4:59
Total length:		37:38
