= Another You (Armin van Buuren song) =

Single by Armin van Buuren featuring Mr. Probz

from the album Embrace
- Released: 8 May 2015
- Studio: Armada Studios, Amsterdam
- Genre: Electro house; progressive house (Original); Big room house (Mark Sixma Remix)
- Length: 3:12
- Label: Armind; Armada
- Songwriters: Armin van Buuren; Benno de Goeij; Dennis Princewell Stehr; Niels Geusebroek
- Producers: Armin van Buuren; Benno de Goeij

Armin van Buuren singles chronology
"Hystereo" (2014)	"Another You" (2015)	"Stardust" (2015)

Mr Probz singles chronology
"Little Secrets" (2014)	"Another You" (2015)	"Fine Ass Mess" (2016)

Music video
- "Another You" on YouTube

"Another You" is a song by Dutch DJ and record producer Armin van Buuren. It features the vocals from Dutch singer Mr. Probz. The song was released on 8 May 2015 by Armada Music, as the first single from Armin van Buuren's sixth studio album, Embrace. "Another You" became both Armin van Buuren and Mr. Probz's fourth top 10 hit on the Single Top 100 chart in the Netherlands.

== Track listing ==
- Digital download
1. "Another You" (featuring Mr. Probz) (radio edit) – 3:12
- Digital download
1. "Another You" (featuring Mr. Probz) (extended mix) – 4:54
2. "Another You" (featuring Mr. Probz) (Mark Sixma radio edit) – 3:41
3. "Another You" (featuring Mr. Probz) (Mark Sixma remix) – 4:41
4. "Another You" (featuring Mr. Probz) (Ronski Speed remix) – 7:53
- Digital download – remix
1. "Another You" (featuring Mr Probz) (Headhunterz radio edit) – 3:07
- Digital download – remix
1. "Another You" (featuring Mr Probz) (Headhunterz remix) – 4:49
- CD single
1. "Another You" (featuring Mr. Probz) (radio edit) – 3:12
2. "Another You" (featuring Mr. Probz) (Mark Sixma radio edit) – 3:41
3. "Another You" (featuring Mr. Probz) (extended mix) – 4:54
4. "Another You" (featuring Mr. Probz) (Mark Sixma remix) – 4:41

== Charts ==
=== Weekly charts ===
Chart (2015)	Peak position
Australia (ARIA)	48
Austria (Ö3 Austria Top 40)	55
Belgium (Ultratop 50 Flanders)	10
Belgium (Ultratip Bubbling Under Wallonia)	4
Czech Republic Singles Digital (ČNS IFPI)	35
France (SNEP)	81
Germany (GfK)	75
Hungary (Stream Top 40)	40
Netherlands (Dutch Top 40)	8
Netherlands (Single Top 100)	7
Poland (Polish Airplay New)	3
Slovakia Singles Digital (ČNS IFPI)	36
Sweden (Sverigetopplistan)	55
US Hot Dance/Electronic Songs (Billboard)	21
US Dance Airplay (Billboard)	6

=== Year-end charts ===
Chart (2015)	Position
Belgium (Ultratop Flanders)	83
Netherlands (Dutch Top 40)	37
Netherlands (Single Top 100)	52
US Hot Dance/Electronic Songs (Billboard)	50

== Certifications ==
Region	Certification	Certified units/sales
Netherlands (NVPI)	Platinum	30,000^{‡}
Sweden (GLF)	Gold	20,000^{‡}
^{‡} Sales+streaming figures based on certification alone.
