= Manse (DJ) =

Swedish DJ and record producer (born 1990)

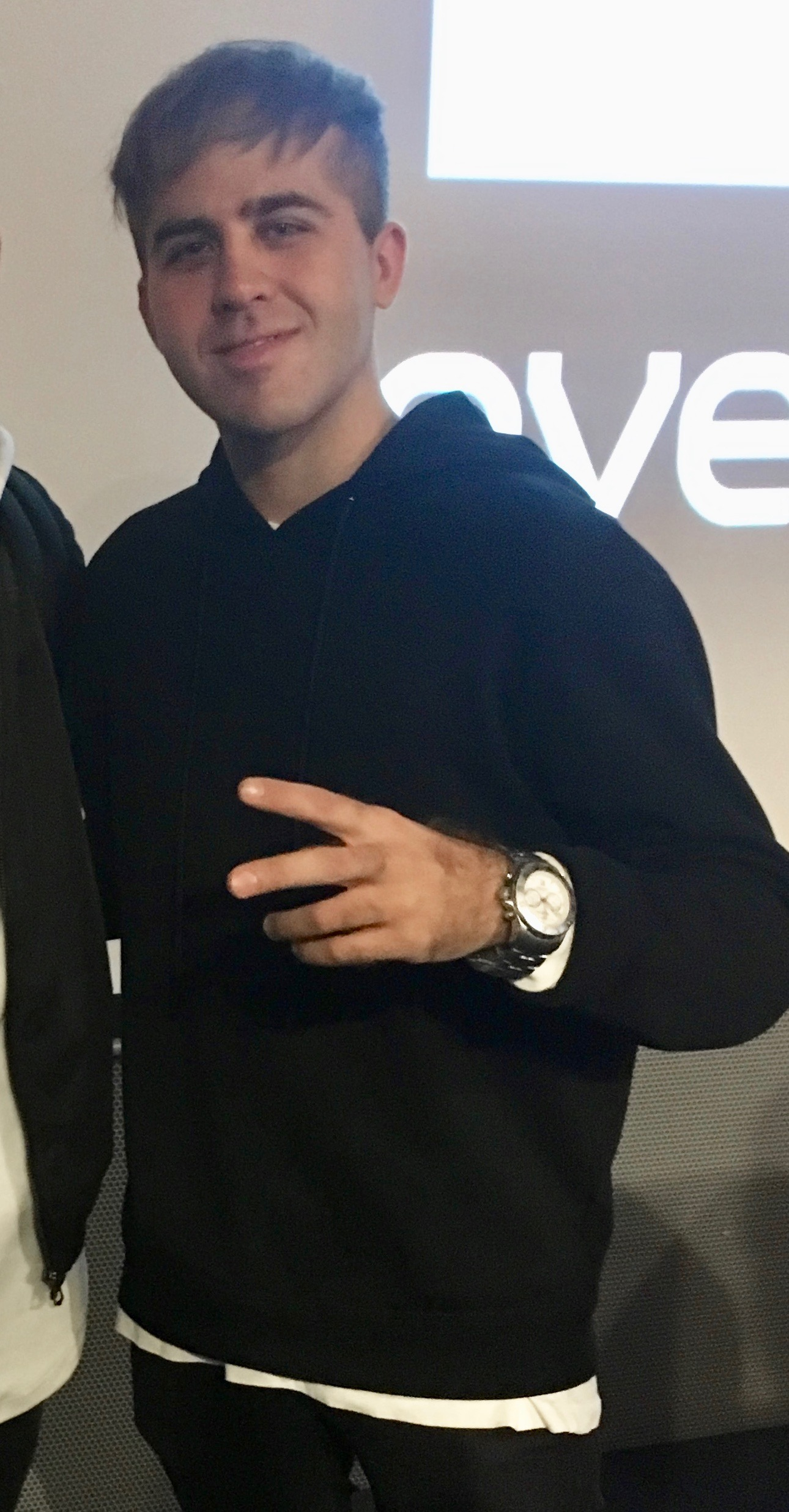
- Manse in 2018

Background information
- Born: Michael Hansen; 17 October 1990 (age 35); Stockholm, Sweden
- Genres: Electro house, progressive house
- Occupations: DJ; Record Producer
- Years active: 2012–present
- Labels: Armada, Revealed, Protocol, Enhanced Music
- Website: manseofficial.com

Michael "Manse" Hansen (born 17 October 1990) is a Swedish DJ and record producer. He became known throughout Sweden when he placed second in a remix contest of the song "Escape" by 3lau along with Paris & Simo. This resulted in Hardwell signing him to his record label, Revealed Recordings. He became known for numerous remixes from 2013 to 2014 before releasing his own singles from 2015.

His best-known title is "Freeze Time", performed with vocalist Alice Berg and released on Hardwell's label, Revealed Recordings. The single reached 8th in the top 100 downloads on the platform Beatport.

Manse has also begun a side project called Stasius producing music in a film score style.

Since 2016, he has a new show called Midweek Mentions live on his Facebook page where his newest tracks are often featured.

== Career ==
=== 2012-2014: First Recognition and Revealed Recordings ===
Hansen first gained industry recognition for his unofficial, dancefloor-slaying remix of Axwell & Ingrosso's 'Roar' that was scouted by Hardwell to receive airplay on his Hardwell On Air radio show.

Manse gained a debut Revealed Recordings release soon after with his 'Escape' remix on the imprint that was handpicked out of over 3500 submissions. Garnering momentum as a fan-favorite and receiving international airplay on magnificent stations including the UK's BBC Radio 1, these moments signaled a rise for Manse's career, when he was personally invited by Nicky Romero to remix his 'Let Me Feel' single with Vicetone.

In the Summer of 2014, Manse performed at the Revealed Recordings label party at Ibiza's Ushuaïa venue. His set featured uplifting and melodic tracks captivating the peak time crowds and also included unique concoction of mash-ups and previews of original material. Manse also performed alongside familiar Revealed names including Thomas Gold and Blasterjaxx.

=== 2015-2021: Remixes, Freeze Time, tour, and collaborations ===
As well as long-time Top 10 DJ Dash Berlin enlisting Manse for remix duties on his collaboration with John Dahlbäck entitled 'Never Let You Go', he also worked his magic on Canadian punks Down With Webster's 'Chills' on Armada's Trice, receiving support across international dance radio shows and at events from Ibiza to Tomorrowland. More recently, his collaboration 'Metric' with Kill The Buzz highlighted Manse's more groovy, club-friendly side.

Manse's hotly-tipped 'Freeze Time' track featuring vocals of Alice Berg, premiered on Pete Tong's Radio 1 show and was also labeled as a future anthem across the airwaves by Hardwell himself. The track hit both #2 in the Beatport progressive house chart and #8 in the overall chart. This year's Miami Music Week Manse demonstrated his live skills at the Revealed Sirius XM Lounge takeover, one of the biggest satellite stations in the US with over 20 million subscribers, that saw him pack his set with upcoming exclusives.

Later in 2015, Michael Hansen aka Manse had a slew of huge releases lined up with Revealed, including the follow-up to 'Freeze Time' that will be a collaboration with vocalist Chris Jones forthcoming on the label, as well as substantial festival dates penciled in for the approaching Summer season including a spot at the Revealed area for Tomorrowland and multiple Ibiza dates.

In 2016 he remixed Hardwell's track "Run Wild." Manse teases in rhythmic bubbling beats before hi-octane build-ups and guitar-tinged breakdowns take it in another direction, all whilst keeping one foot firmly in the club.

Also in 2016, he was given the chance to remix Armin Van Buuren's track 'Freefall.'

At end of 2016, he remixed Thomas Gold's track 'Saint & Sinners.'

Manse's tour in China included his first festival appearance in the region. He expressed that performing at Dreamland Electronic Music Festival, a musical celebration in the Mongolian desert, was truly an unforgettable experience.

Manse expressed his surprise at the level of energy among the Chinese audience, which he found vastly different from his normal relaxed European crowd. "Chinese fans really appreciate my music and are open to new elements. It's the experience with people who like my sets that makes up for the stressful times on the road," he shared.

During 2017 until 2022, he did collaborations, remixes & tracks including Andrew Rayel 'Home' Remix, Flashback EP, and Stasius's Chill Tracks.

=== 2022: DubVision & Afrojack collab ===
In 2022, Manse collaborated with Dutch producers DubVision and Afrojack on a track released through his music platform Never Sleeps.

Although not long released, 'Stay With You' has seen play-out at festivals and venues as far back as 2019 as part of Afrojack's back catalogue, and has now garnered radio support from the likes of Martin Garrix and Lucas & Steve on their respective platforms.

== Discography ==
=== Singles ===
- 2015: Metric (with Kill The Buzz) [Revealed Recordings]
- 2015: Freeze Time (featuring Alice Berg) [Revealed Recordings]
- 2015: Falling Down (with Volt & State, featuring Jamie Drake) [Armada Trice]
- 2015: Rising Sun (featuring Chris Jones) [Revealed Recordings]
- 2015: Last Night Of Our Lives (featuring Niclas Lundin) [Armada Trice]
- 2016: Don't Look Back (with Jakko and Killogy) [Armada Trice]
- 2016: All Around (featuring Emily Harder) [Armada Trice]
- 2016: Mankind [Self-Released]
- 2016: Back Again (with Thomas Newson) [Revealed Recordings]
- 2016: We Come Alive (featuring Cornelia Jakobs) [Enhanced Music]
- 2016: No Matter Where We Are [Revealed Recordings]
- 2016: Atlas (with Julian Calor) [Revealed Recordings]
- 2017: Time Of Our Lives (featuring Jantine) [Armada Trice]
- 2017: A Little Bit Closer (with Frank Pole featuring Jason Walker) [Armada Trice]
- 2017: Back To You (with Shaylen) [Thrive Music]
- 2017: Where We Want To Be (featuring Maruja Retana) [Armada Trice]
- 2017: A Place Only We Know (featuring Robin Valo) [Flashback EP] [Self-Released]
- 2017: See the Light [Flashback EP] [Self-Released]
- 2017: The Wall [Flashback EP] [Self-Released]
- 2018: Coastin (featuring Mick Fousé) [Gemstone Records]
- 2018: Alone Together [Self-Released]
- 2019: The Way Back (with Stasius) [Self-Released]
- 2019: Summer ID [Self-Released]
- 2019: Perspective (with Stasius) [Self-Released]
- 2019: Runaway (with Cuebrick featuring Ilves) [Revealed Recordings]
- 2019: Euphoria (with Stasius) [Self-Released]
- 2019: Last Forever [Self-Released]
- 2019: Collateral (with Stasius) [Self-Released]
- 2019: Blame (with David Shane) [Revealed Recordings]
- 2019: Shine (with David Shane featuring Greencoast) [Thrive Music]
- 2019: Summer Rain (with YARO featuring Philip Strand) [Revealed Recordings]
- 2019: Outlaws (with JRL featuring Jonny Rose) [Revealed Recordings]
- 2020: Hypnotised [Self-Released]
- 2020: Our Symphony (with WildVibes featuring Vories) [Thrive Music (Capitol Records)]
- 2020: Close to me [Thrive Music (Capitol Records)]
- 2020: A Little Bit (with Meikle & Max Adrian featuring Elle Vee) [Revealed Recordings]
- 2020: Feel It Still (with The High & loafers) [Astrokid.se]
- 2020: With You (with SIVV) [Thrive Music (Capitol Records)]
- 2020: time (with Stasius) [Self-Released]
- 2021: Without You [Self-Released]
- 2021: WARNING [Self-Released]
- 2021: Broken (featuring Affas) [LMG | OUTFLY]
- 2021: Forever (featuring Affas) [LMG | OUTFLY]
- 2021: Dream Awake (with Cuebrick) [Generation Smash (Smash the House)]
- 2021: Find A Way (with Neyra featuring Nino Lucarelli) [Revealed Recordings]
- 2022: Devil Smile (with Sammy Boyle featuring Nikodemus Juhlin) [TurnItUpMuzik (Black Hole Recordings)]
- 2022: Tamed Again [LMG | OUTFLY]
- 2022: Stay With You (with DubVision, Afrojack, & Never Sleeps) [Tomorrowland Music]
- 2022: Don't Miss Out (with Blackcode featuring Heleen) [Revealed Recordings]
- 2022: The One That Got Away (with JRL) [LoudKult]
- 2022: Nobody (with Jac & Harri featuring Amanda Collis) [Revealed Recordings]
- 2022: Bring Me To Life (featuring Vincent Voort & ALESSA.A) [Tales Of Freedom]
- 2022: anybody [Self-Released]
- 2022: Nothing At All (with DANÊL featuring William Viggo) [Tales Of Freedom]
- 2022: Run (with Elitegence featuring Sarah de Warren) [Proximity]
- 2023: Carry On (featuring Ashley Drake) [Warner Music Sweden AB]
- 2023: Everything (with joenghyeon featuring Able Faces) [Warner Music Sweden AB]
- 2023: Feel Alive [Warner Music Sweden AB]
- 2023: Dreamers (featuring Felix Samuel) [Warner Music Sweden AB]
- 2023: Friends With The Night (with SVNSETS featuring Jocelyn Alice) [Warner Music Sweden AB]
- 2023: Falling Out [Self-Released]
- 2023: Better Off Alone [Self-Released]
- 2024: Push Me Away [Self-Released]
- 2024: Won't Let Go (with Neyra) [Tales Of Freedom]
- 2024: Someone To Kiss Tonight (with Dayana) [Global Records, Dance Differently]
- 2024: One Sign (with KDH) [Protocol Recordings]
- 2024: When The Night Ends (with Hina Kawaga & YONAKA Band) [Land Music]
- 2024: Be Ok (with Cuebrick & Blaze U featuring Crooked Bangs) [Future House Cloud]
- 2024: Whatever Comes (with Jeffrey Sutorius & LYNDO featuring April Bender) [BODYWRMR]
- 2024: Tonight (with Calvo) [Future House Cloud]

=== Remixes ===
- 2013: Paris & Simo and 3lau featuring Bright Lights – "Escape" (Manse Remix) [Revealed Recordings]
- 2014: Down With Webster – "Chills" (Manse Remix) [Armada Trice]
- 2014: Nicky Romero and Vicetone featuring When We Are Wild – "Let Me Feel" (Manse Remix) [Protocol Recordings]
- 2015: John Dahlback and Dash Berlin featuring BullySongs – "Never Let You Go" (Manse Remix) [Armada Trice]
- 2016: Thomas Hayes featuring Kyler England – "Golden" (Manse Remix) [Enhanced]
- 2016: Hardwell featuring Jake Reese – "Run Wild" (Manse Remix) [Revealed Recordings]
- 2016: Armin van Buuren featuring BullySongs – "Freefall" (Manse Remix) [Armada Music]
- 2017: Thomas Gold featuring M. Bronx – "Saints & Sinners" (Manse Remix) [Armada Records]
- 2017: Andrew Rayel featuring Jonathan Mendelsohn – "Home" (Manse Remix) [Armind Armada]
- 2018: Ravitez – "I'm Not The One" (Manse Remix) [Wall Recordings]
- 2019: Funk Machine & Taku-Hero – "Something" (Manse Remix) [Revealed Recordings]
- 2019: Funk Machine & Taku-Hero featuring BullySongs – "It Ain't Over" (Manse Remix) [Revealed Recordings]
- 2022: Gryffin & OneRepublic - "You Were Loved" (Manse Remix)
