= Heatbeat =

Argentine musician

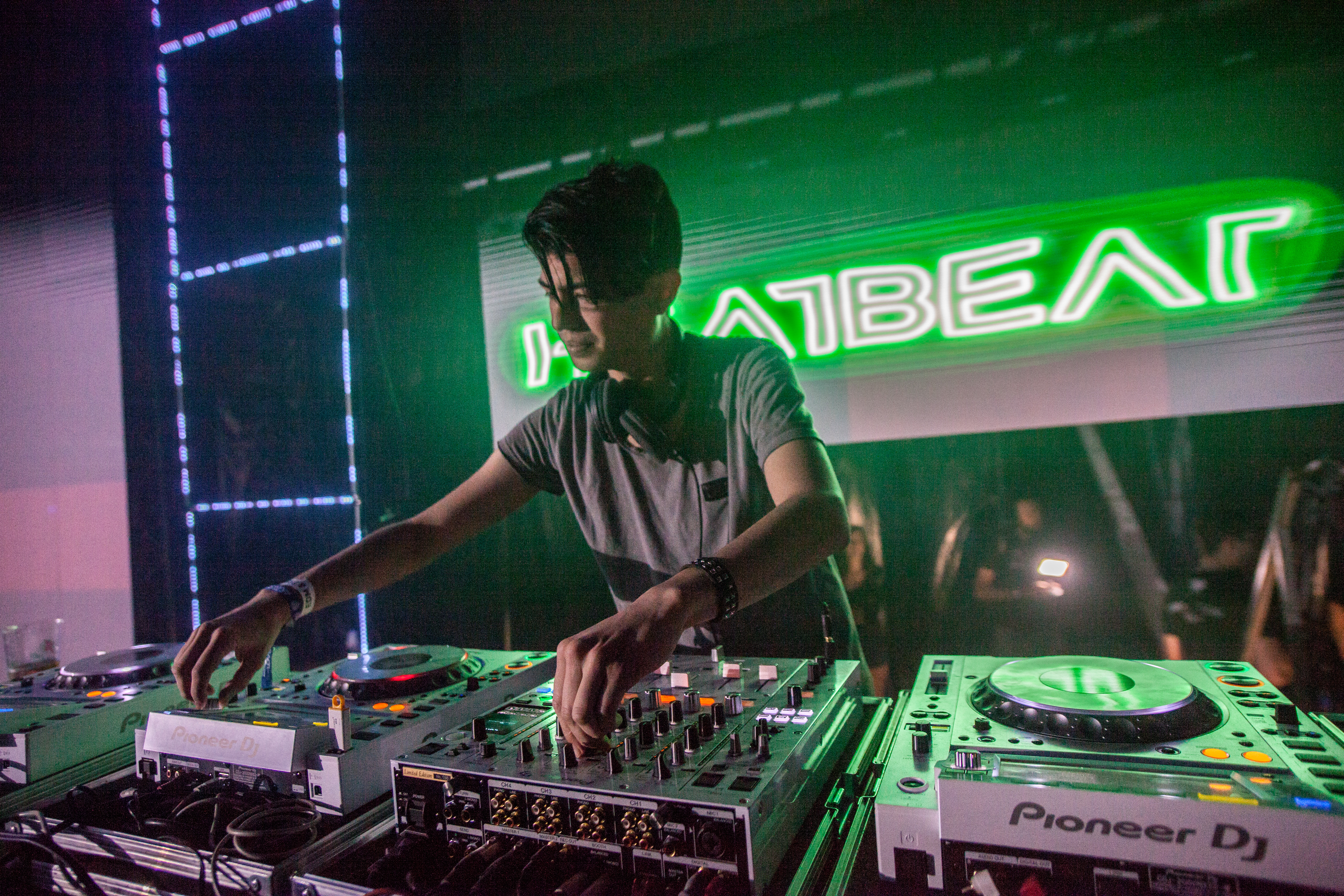
- Heatbeat performing at festival Beats for Love in 2019 (Ostrava, Czech Republic)

Background information
- Also known as: Heatbeat, Stacker, More Analog
- Origin: Argentina
- Genres: Trance, tech trance, progressive house
- Instruments: Synthesizer, drum machine, equalizer, personal computer
- Years active: 2006-present
- Labels: AERYS, Armada Music, Garuda, Istmo Music
- Members: Matias Faint
- Past members: Agustin Servente
- Website: Heatbeat Music

Heatbeat are an Argentinian trance and electro house production project formed in 2006 by Agustin Servente and Matias Chavez a.k.a. Matias Faint, who scored a number of hits since their formation. Their most famous tracks to date are "Paradise Garage", "Ask the Angels", "Roses Never Cry", "Rocker Monster", "Chow Mein", "Game Over", "Aerys", "Bloody Moon" and "Cell". Implementing various Spanish-styled note sections into their tracks, their style of trance is unique and identifiable. Signing on to the Armada record label started by trance artist Armin van Buuren, their music reaches a widespread trance audience.

As they produce various subgenres of trance, the group integrates their latest tracks and bootlegs of current song hits into their live sets.

== History ==
While Servente and Faint were young, they developed an interest in the EDM genre. The two were mainly influenced by artists such as Paul van Dyk, The Prodigy, BT, and others. As both of them have strong skills in instruments such as the piano, drums, and guitar, they began producing at an early age.

In recent years, Heatbeat received support from other producers and DJs such as Armin van Buuren, Paul van Dyk, Tiësto, and Markus Schulz. They now perform alongside artists such as Above & Beyond, John O'Callaghan, Cosmic Gate, and Ferry Corsten. Their songs and mixes have aired on electronic music broadcast stations worldwide.

The Argentine trance duo have played at events around the world, such as Armin van Buuren's A State of Trance show in Moscow, Miami, Ibiza, Los Angeles, and in clubs in Buenos Aires. In 2012, the two completed their first worldwide tour, started their own radio show, and also had two tracks in Beatport's top trance song chart. The pair received support from names and labels in EDM, and they also achieved a rank of 81 in DJ Mag's Top 100 in 2012.

In 2017, Heatbeat created their own label with Armada Music, Aerys Records. The idea of this project is to give opportunities to different artists or producers in Argentina or Latin America. Some of these producers are Luciano Martinez, Architect, Apaches, and Danilo Ercole.

Since 2018, Matias is the sole member of Heatbeat.

== Discography ==
=== Albums ===
- Global Monster (2014)

=== Singles ===
- Matias Faint & Agustin Servente - The Sky Isn't The Limit [Istmo Music]
- Matias Faint & Agustin Servente pres. Heatbeat - Another Loud Thought [Istmo Music]
- Heatbeat - Harmony Rain [Istmo Music]
- Heatbeat - Protoculture [Istmo Music]
- Heatbeat - Nebula [High Contrast]
- Heatbeat - Push Over [Armada]
- Heatbeat - Chochicho Tiene Hambre [Armada]
- Heatbeat pres. Matias Faint - Sxing [In Charge]
- Heatbeat pres. Agustin Servente - Sense & Sensibility [Istmo Music]
- Heatbeat - Caledonia [Armada]
- Heatbeat - Spindash [Armada]
- Heatbeat - Geek Love [Armada]
- Heatbeat - Paradise Garage [Armada]
- Heatbeat - Vergatron [Armada]
- Heatbeat pres. Matias Faint - Ketazord [Istmo Music]
- Stacker - Why [Solaris]
- Matias Faint - Hooverlist [High Contrast]
- Matias Faint - Toxic [High Contrast]
- Agustin Servente - Esturion [Kill The Lights]
- Heatbeat feat. Josie - Because of You [Armada]
- Heatbeat feat. Josie - Because of You (Redubberz Mix) [Armada]
- Matias Faint - Neitherworld (Original mix) [High Contrast]
- Matias Faint - Neitherworld (Heatbeat Remix) [High Contrast]
- Heatbeat - Mr Walrus [Armada]
- Heatbeat - Hadoken [Armada]
- Heatbeat & Exit - Go [Subculture]
- Matias Faint - Last Breath [High Contrast]
- Heatbeat - Trash [Armada]
- Heatbeat - Shawarma [Armada]
- Heatbeat - Eternity [Vandit]
- Heatbeat pres. Heatdeep feat. Andrea Cardenal - Kids [Istmo Music]
- Heatbeat feat. Jessica Bennett - Light Up [Armada]
- Heatbeat feat. Jessica Bennett - Light Up (Rough Mix) [Armada]
- Heatbeat - Ask The Angels [Armada]
- Heatbeat - Ask The Cat [Armada]
- Matias Faint - Casino Fire [Armada]
- Heatbeat - Chinpokomon [Armada]
- Heatbeat - Roses Never Cry [Armada]
- Heatbeat - Rocker Monster [Captivating Sounds/Armada]
- Heatbeat - Arganda [Captivating Sounds/Armada]
- Heatbeat - Chow Mein [Captivating Sounds/Armada]
- Heatbeat - Extra Bacon [Captivating Sounds/Armada]
- Heatbeat - Game Over [Mainstage/Armada]
- Heatbeat - #BOOM [Armada]
- Heatbeat - Aerys [Armada]
- Heatbeat - Bloody Moon [Armada]
- Heatbeat - Buenosaurus [Armada Trice]
- Heatbeat - Berserker [Armada Captivating]
- Heatbeat - It's Killing Me [Armada Captivating]

==== 2016 ====
- Heatbeat - TYNO [Armada Captivating]
- Heatbeat - Imperio [Who's Afraid of 138?!]
- Heatbeat - Test Your Might [Who's Afraid of 138?!]

==== 2017 ====
- Heatbeat - Mechanizer [AERYS]
- Heatbeat - Bondi [AERYS]
- Heatbeat - Thunderbolt [AERYS]
- Heatbeat presents Stacker - Omellette Paradise [AERYS]
- Heatbeat - Section 9 [AERYS]
- Heatbeat - Meteora [AERYS]
- Heatbeat - Total Ownage [AERYS]
- Heatbeat - Ecuador [AERYS]

==== 2018 ====
- Heatbeat - Bebop [AERYS]
- Heatbeat - Supersaw [Who's Afraid of 138]
- Heatbeat - Mortal Kombat [AERYS]
- Heatbeat - Stadium Arcadium [AERYS]

==== 2020 ====
- Heatbeat - Sheena [Reaching Altitude]

=== Collaborations ===
- Heatbeat & Der Mystik - The Last Reminder [Real Music]
- Heatbeat & Santiago Nino - Resaka [Dub Tech]
- Stacker & Detune - Rosary [Istmo Music]
- Heatbeat & Randy Boyer pres. Heatboyer - Happy Ending [Istmo Music]
- Stacker & Rodrigo Deem - Distance [Istmo Music]
- Stacker & Rj Van Xetten - Digital Andromeda [Istmo Music]
- John O'Callaghan & Heatbeat - Las Lilas
- Richard Durand & Heatbeat - Devils Inside
- Heatbeat & Chris Schweizer - Nasty
- Heatbeat & Rodrigo Deem - Felina
- Heatbeat & Quilla - Secret [Armada Captivating]
- Heatbeat & Bjorn Akesson - Pharaon [Future Sound of Egypt]
- Heatbeat & Chris Schweizer - Cell [Armada Captivating]
- Alex M.O.R.P.H. & Heatbeat - Amistad [Vandit]

==== 2016 ====
- Heatbeat & Tomas Heredia - I Am Darkness [A State of Trance]
- Heatbeat & Eric Lumiere - You've Got Me Now [Armada]
- Team Argentina (Heatbeat, Chris Schweizer and Tomas Heredia) - Alpha Omega [Armada Captivating]
- Heatbeat & Chris Schweizer - Samurai [Who's Afraid of 138?!]

==== 2017 ====
- Heatbeat & Jordan Suckley - Brutal [AERYS]
- Heatbeat & Alex M.O.R.P.H - Shenlong [AERYS]
- Heatbeat & DIM3NSION - Mutenroy [AERYS]

=== Remixes ===
- Mike Foyle - One Day (Faint & Agustin Servente Remix) [Impressive]
- 2-Trance - Siberian Dawn (Heatbeat Remix) [Novascape]
- Santiago Nino - Motion (Heatbeat Remix) [Dub Tech]
- Der Mystik – Jewel Eyes (Heatbeat Remix) [Neuroscience]
- Flavio Grifo - No Rules (Heatbeat Nütech Remix) [Novascape]
- Heatbeat - Protoculture (Heatbeat Remix) [Istmo]
- Juiz Electric vs DJ Katakis - African Beauty (Heatbeat Remix) [Follow]
- Santiago Niño & Damien Heck feat. Antonia Lucas - Red Sky (Heatbeat Remix) [Vandit]
- Milan Lieskovsky - Elenya (Heatbeat Remix) [Progez]
- Randy Boyer & Kristina Sky - Set It Off (Heatbeat Remix) [Vandit Digital]
- Pulsate - Fuel the passion (Heatbeat Remix) [Infrasonic]
- Randy Boyer - Alive (Heatbeat Remix) [Flashover]
- Ross & Buddy - Lights Out (Heatbeat pres. Matias Faint Remix) [Full Tilt]
- Bryan Kearney pres. Spunuldrick - The Walrus (Heatbeat pres. Matias Faint Remix) [Full Tilt]
- Sindre Eide vs Aimar feat. Layla J - Desert Snow (Heatbeat Remix) [Fektive]
- Joshy Rotten - Forever (Heatbeat Remix) [Electric Candy]
- Joshy Rotten - Forever (Heatbeat Dub Mix) [Electric Candy]
- Judge Jules feat Headstrong - Could Be Love (Heatbeat Remix) [Maelstrom]
- Solarstone feat. Essence - Lunar Rings (Heatbeat Remix) [Solaris]
- Solarstone feat. Essence - Lunar Rings (Heatbeat Dub Mix) [Solaris]
- Element One - While it Lasted (Heatbeat Remix) [Motion]
- Bobina - More Than Love (Heatbeat Remix) [Newstate]
- Bobina - More Than Love (Heatbeat Dub Mix) [Newstate]
- Re:Locate & Mark Sixma – Piranha (Heatbeat Remix) [Spinning]
- John O'Callaghan feat. Sarah Howells - Find Yourself (Heatbeat Remix) [Armada]
- Ferry Corsten - Made of Love (Heatbeat Remix) [Flashover]
- Matias Faint - Neitherworld (Heatbeat Remix) [High Contrast]
- Jonas Stenberg - Trademark (Heatbeat Remix) [Musical Madness]
- Faruk Sabanci feat. Renee Stakey - Stranger (Heatbeat Remix) [Arisa Audio]
- Gareth Emery - I Will Be The Same (Heatbeat Remix) [Garuda]
- Tyler Michaud & Interstate - Junkie (Heatbeat Remix) [Vandit]
- John O'Callaghan - Desert Orchid (Alejandro Llermanos & Agustin Servente Remix)
- Tom Colontonio - Reflection (Heatbeat Remix) [Armada]
- Phillippe El Sisi feat. Josie - Over You (Heatbeat Remix) [Armada]
- Heatbeat - Shawarma (Chill Out Mix) [Armada]
- Lange - TBA (Heatbeat Remix)
- W&W - Invasion (Heatbeat Remix)
- Parker & Hanson - Afterthought (Heatbeat Remix) [Anjunabeats]
- Lange vs. Gareth Emery - This Is New York (Heatbeat Remix)
- Armin van Buuren feat. Ana Criado - Suddenly Summer (Heatbeat Remix)
- Paul Webster - The Joker (Heatbeat Remix)
- Solarstone vs. Scott Bond - 3rd Earth (Heatbeat Remix)
- Mark Sherry - Phantasmic (Heatbeat Remix)
- Cosmic Gate - So Get Up (Heatbeat Remix)
- Giuseppe Ottaviani with Audiocells featuring Shannon Hurley - I Am Your Shadow (Heatbeat Remix) [Black Hole Recordings]
- Sebastien feat. Satellite Empire - Escape (Heatbeat Remix) [Armada]
- Armin van Buuren & BullySongs - Freefall (Heatbeat Remix) [Armada]
- Alex M.O.R.P.H. - Don't Talk Away The Magic feat. Song and The Moon (Heatbeat Remix) [Who's Afraid of 138?!]

- 2017.

- Marc Marberg, Kyau & Albert - Orange Bill (Heatbeat Remix) [ARVA]
- Thomas Knight - Emerge (Heatbeat Remix) [Genesis]
- Ferry Corsten - Trust (Heatbeat Remix) [Flashover]
- AlexMo - Children of the Night (Heatbeat Remix) [MorAlity]
