= Natalie Gioia =

Russian-Ukrainian EDM singer (born 1978)

Natalia Sibekina Наталія Сібекіна
- Also known as: Natalie Gioia
- Born: Natalia Svistyelnikova; 16 May 1978 (age 48); Armavir, Russian SFSR, USSR
- Origin: Kuban, Russia
- Genres: EDM; vocal trance; house; pop; R&B; techno
- Occupations: Singer; songwriter; DJ
- Instruments: Vocals; piano
- Years active: 1997-present
- Labels: Armada; Spinnin' Records; Black Hole Recordings; Garuda
- Website: facebook.com/nataliegioiaofficial

Natalia Sibekina (Ukrainian: Наталія Сібекіна; Russian: Наталия Сибекина; née Svistyelnikova [Russian: Свистельникова]; born 16 May 1978), known professionally as Natalie Gioia (Italian pronunciation: [ˈdʒɔːja]), is a Russian-Ukrainian electronic music vocalist and songwriter.

== Biography ==
Natalia Svistyelnikova was born in Armavir, Russia. She began her musical career at the age of 16. From 1997 to 2000, she was a member of the female pop project Pyostraya Zhizn` (Пёстрая Жизнь; "Colorful Life"), actively touring across Russia. In 1999, the group was recognized as the best musical project of the Kuban region. Natalia is a two-time winner of the Musical Planet competition (1996 and 1997) in the North Caucasus and has received an award for her creative contribution to the cultural development of the Kuban region. She also won first place in the "Voice of Russia" competition.

In 2000, she launched her solo career with tours supported by the French company Partush Group. This collaboration lasted several years, during which she performed in Tunisia. In 2005, while in Tunisia, she met Italian producer Flavio Demichelis, who invited her to join the Italian band New Trolls. In 2006, Natalia released the single Che donna vorrei, which was included in an Italian compilation of popular music.

In 2009 Natalia came to Ukraine, where she met her love Valeriy Sibekin. This fact influenced Natalie's music tastes and she tried to sing on the EDM tracks. After her first EDM collaboration was released through Angelu music label, Natalie immediately caught the attention of producers like EDU and Tucandeo, which developed her professionalism in this genre of music. Understanding this song are not the ones, which could be the center of her music career, she started to collaborate with Alex M.O.R.P.H. As the result, track Dreams was released on the A State of Trance (Armada) label. Dreams of Alex and Natalie reached TOP5 tracks (Beatport.com Trance Chart) and was included to the Universal Religion Chapter 7 (by Armin van Buuren).

== Discography ==
=== Singles ===
Name	Title	Remixers	Label	Year
Armin van Buuren, Natalie Gioia	Viva L'Opera	–	Armada	2024
Eximinds, Natalie Gioia	Keep Me Safe	–	Suanda	2022
Rene Ablaze, Natalie Gioia	Who You Are	–	Future Sequence (Planet Punk Music)	2021
RAM, Talla 2XLC, Natalie Gioia	Shine	–	Nocturnal Knights Music	2021
Luminn, Natalie Gioia	Shapeshifter	–	Statement! (Armada)	2021
Alexander Popov, Natalie Gioia	Dreamtime	–	Interplay Records	2021
DJ T.H., Natalie Gioia	Euphoria	Talla 2XLC	Interplay Records	2021
Roman Messer, Natalie Gioia	Miracle	Ahmed Helmy	Suanda	2021
Roger Shah, Natalie Gioia	Save The World	Sunlounger	FSOE Chill	2021
Alexander Popov, Natalie Gioia, Attila Syah	Nothing Is Over	Roman Messer	Interplay Records (Armada Music)	2020
Eximinds, Natalie Gioia	Be Free	–	Suanda Chillout	2020
Norni, Natalie Gioia	By Your Side	–	Suanda	2020
Shogun, Natalie Gioia	Time For Us	–	Serendipity Muzik	2020
Roman Messer, Natalie Gioia	Miracle	–	Suanda	2020
Bobina and Natalie Gioia	Through The Wall	–	Uniqode Lab	2020
Natalie Gioia	Boom Boom	–	UMPG Music	2020
Alexander Popov, Natalie Gioia	Disarm Me	A.R.D.I.	Interplay Records (Armada Music)	2019
Natalie Gioia	It's Your Time	–	Interplay Records (Armada Music)	2019
Ruben De Ronde, Natalie Gioia, Yoel Lewis	Madrigal	Solis & Sean Truby	Who's Afraid Of 138?! (Armada Music)	2019
Natalie Gioia, ARCZI, Mart Sine	Deja Vu	–	AVA White	2019
Natalie Gioia	Fight With You	–	Interplay Records (Armada Music)	2019
Roger Shah, Natalie Gioia	Save The World	–	Future Sound of Egypt	2019
Natalie Gioia, Mart Sine	It's Your Life	–	Uplift Recordings (RazNitzanMusic)	2019
Whiteout, Natalie Gioia	Touch Me	–	Interplay Records (Armada Music)	2019
Natalie Gioia, Cyril Ryaz, Maratone	Runaway	–	Interplay Records (Armada Music)	2019
Natalie Gioia	Kraschyi Den'	Laskowski	MOON Records	2019
Ram, Darren Porter, Natalie Gioia	One Million Seconds	Billy Gillies	Nocturnal Animals	2019
Alan Morris, Natalie Gioia	Shade By Shade	–	Grotesque	2019
Alexander Popov, Natalie Gioia	Disarm Me	–	Interplay Records (Armada Music)	2019
Eximinds, Natalie Gioia	I Will Always Be With You	–	Garuda	2019
Ram, Darren Porter, Natalie Gioia	One Million Seconds	–	Grotesque	2019
Bobina, Natalie Gioia	Lost & Found	–	Magik Muzik	2019
Alexander Popov, Natalie Gioia, Attila Syah	Nothing Is Over	–	Interplay Records (Armada Music)	2018
Rene Ablaze, DJ T.H., Natalie Gioia	Take Life in Your Hands	–	Grotesque	2018
Natalie Gioia, Yoel Lewis	Heroes	–	Black Sunset	2018
Ruben De Ronde, Natalie Gioia, Yoel Lewis	Madrigal	–	Statement! (Armada Music)	2018
Ram, Roger Shah, Natalie Gioia	For The One You Love	–	Future Sound Of Egypt	2018
Sagan, Natalie Gioia	Takes Me Higher	–	Spinnin' (Warner Music)	2018
Sied van Riel, Natalie Gioia	Hold Me Close	–	Subculture	2018
Natalie Gioia, Dan Thompson	Be in Love	Sam Laxton	Grotesque	2018
Natalie Gioia	Koliory	–	MOON Records	2018
Natalie Gioia, Dan Thompson	Be in Love	–	Grotesque (Black Hole Recordings)	2017
Ronski Speed, Natalie Gioia	Do You Believe	–	Maracaido Records	2017
Eximinds, Natalie Gioia	Saving Me From Night	–	Interplay Records (Armada Music)	2017
Anna Lee, A.R.D.I., Natalie Gioia	We Are Believers	–	AVA White	2017
Ruben de Ronde, Natalie Gioia	My Story	–	Statement! (Armada Music)	2017
DJ FEEL, Natalie Gioia	Madwoman	Attila Syah	SirAdrianMusic	2016
Bobina, Natalie Gioia	My Everything	UCast	Magik Muzik (Black Hole Recordings)	2016
James Kiedis, Natalie Gioia	Come Over	–	Rielism (Black Hole Recordings)	2016
Alex M.O.R.P.H., Den Rize, Natalie Gioia	Angelic	–	Armada Music	2016
Eximinds, Natalie Gioia	I'll Be Your Angel	Matt Chowski	AVA Recordings	2016
Bobina, Natalie Gioia	The Magik	–	Magik Muzik (Black Hole Recordings)	2016
Allen & Envy, Andy Elliass, Natalie Gioia	In Love	Somna	Grotesque (Black Hole Recordings)	2016
RAM, Chris Metcalfe, Natalie Gioia	Don't Give Up	Craig Connelly	Black Hole Recordings	2016
Roman Messer, Natalie Gioia	Religion	DJ FEEL	Suanda Music	2016
Binary Finary, Dreamy, Natalie Gioia	Don't Hurt	–	Go On Air (Black Hole Recordings)	2015
Bobina, Natalie Gioia	Addicted	–	Black Hole Recordings / Kontor Records (Warner Music)	2015
Alex M.O.R.P.H., Natalie Gioia	4Ever	–	Vandit Records	2015
Alex M.O.R.P.H., Natalie Gioia	The Reason	–	A State of Trance	2014
Alex M.O.R.P.H., Natalie Gioia	My Heaven	–	A State of Trance	2014
Alex M.O.R.P.H., Natalie Gioia	Dreams	–	A State of Trance	2013
Tucandeo, Natalie Gioia	Disappear	Xtigma	In Sessions	2013
EDU, Natalie Gioia	You & Me	LTN, Arcalis	InfraProgressive	2013
Brezza, DJ JP, Natalie Gioia	Per Sempre	–	Luxurious Records	2013

== Awards and nominations ==
- No. 6 A State of Trance, Tune of the Year 2021 (by Armin van Buuren) with the track "Shine"
- No. 22 Future Sound Of Egypt, Wonder of the Year 2019 (by Aly & Fila) with the track "Save The World"
- No. 27 A State of Trance, Tune of the Year 2019 (by Armin van Buuren) with the track "One Million Seconds"
- No. 18 A State of Trance, Tune of the Year 2018 (by Armin van Buuren) with the track "For The One You Love"
- No. 2 in TOP100 2015 by KISS FM - the biggest FM dance radio network in Europe, with the track "Addicted"
- No. 3 A State of Trance, Tune of the Year 2014 (by Armin van Buuren) with the track "The Reason"
- No. 21 A State of Trance, Tune of the Year 2014 (by Armin van Buuren) with the track "My Heaven"
- No. 7 A State of Trance, Tune of the Year 2013 (by Armin van Buuren) with the track "Dreams"
