= Ahmed Romel =

Jordanian trance music and deep house producer

- Born: July 8, 1989 (age 36); Dubai
- Citizenship: Jordanian
- Occupations: Trance music, Deep house producer
- Years active: Since 2007
- Known for: Orchestrance
- Website: ahmedromel.com

Ahmed Romel (born July 8, 1989, in Dubai) is a Jordanian trance music and deep house producer known for his orchestral and oriental emotional trance music. He hosts the weekly radio show "Orchestrance" and performs across the world including Tomorrowland, Luminosity Beach Festival, FSOE 400, 450 & 600, with his sold-out debut artist album RÜYA, released in August 2019.

== Career ==
Ahmed Romel grew a passion for dance music since his young age. In 2007, he decided himself to trance with the main focus on euphoric and uplifting productions.

In 2009, he participated in the annual AH.FM (After Hours FM) Celebration "End Of The Year Countdown 2009", and won the 1st place by Listeners' Votes. In the same year he got equipment and applications to start producing trance tracks.

He has been involved with labels like FSOE Recordings, Armada as well as Abora Recordings and Blue Soho Recordings, where his first reputable release "Only For You" came out, in 2011. It topped radio shows as well as download charts and gained recognition from a number of DJs.

Ahmed won "Future Favorite" by A State of Trance for his tracks like "Only For You", "L'Absente" or "Victory", which was voted on 28th as Tune Of The Year by A State of Trance of 2013 and was considered as "one of the most melodic singles". He has also won "Future Favorite" for his remixes of Aiera - Dunes on Abora Recordings, Harmonic Rush - The Dark Side of Persia on Edge EDM Records, and Tony Nesse - Indestructible on FSOE Recordings. In total, he has won the award 10 times.

In 2016, the listeners of A State of Trance voted his collaboration with Aly & Fila "Kingdoms" (Anthem of FSOE 450)" on 5th as Tune Of The Year of 2016.

In 2019, Ahmed was ranked on 3rd place as "Best Trance DJ" at annual votings by Trance Podium. In the same year he released his sold-out debut artist album RÜYA on Future Sound of Egypt Recordings, which was one of the most anticipated albums of 2019 year in trance music.

Ahmed Romel performs at festivals such as EDC Las Vegas, Tomorrowland, FSOE 300 in Amsterdam, FSOE 400 in Melbourne, FSOE 450 Luxor, FSOE 600 in Bangkok also in addition to other gigs around the globe like in Germany, Argentina or in the Netherlands at Luminosity, what is considered as 'one of the best' Trance Festivals.

== Discography ==
=== Singles ===
- 2010: Ahmed Romel – Shuttled
- 2010: Ahmed Romel – Only For You
- 2012: Ahmed Romel – City Of Life
- 2012: Ahmed Romel & Running Man – Azure
- 2012: Ahmed Romel Pres. Merove – Ourjowan
- 2013: Philippe El Sisi & Ahmed Romel – Gloria
- 2013: Alexandre Bergheau & Ahmed Romel – Ohelia
- 2013: Ahmed Romel – Victory
- 2013: Ahmed Romel – Moon Glow
- 2013: Illitheas & Ahmed Romel – Mavikus
- 2013: Ahmed Romel & Pizz@dox – Sirens
- 2013: Ahmed Romel & Pizz@dox – Patriot
- 2013: Ahmed Romel & Tonny Nesse – Alva
- 2014: Simon O'Shine & Ahmed Romel – L'Absente
- 2014: Ahmed Romel – Yarden
- 2014: Ahmed Romel – Prism
- 2014: Ahmed Romel – Almeida
- 2014: Ahmed Romel – Mysterious Orient
- 2015: Ahmed Romel – Saudade
- 2015: Ahmed Romel & Hazem Beltagui - Nihavent
- 2015: Ahmed Romel – Paradisum
- 2015: Ahmed Romel & Illitheas – Lands Of Soho
- 2016: Ahmed Romel & Amir Hussain – Serenità
- 2016: Ahmed Romel – Kenopsia
- 2016: Ahmed Romel – Himba
- 2016: Ahmed Romel – Mandalore
- 2016: Ahmed Romel – Drusilla
- 2016: Aly & Fila & Ahmed Romel – Kingdoms (FSOE450 Anthem)
- 2017: Ahmed Romel – Dust & Echoes
- 2017: Ahmed Romel vs A & Z – Revive
- 2017: Ahmed Romel – Kairos
- 2017: Simon O’Shine & Ahmed Romel – Erytheia
- 2017: Ahmed Romel – Vanaheim
- 2018: Ahmed Romel – Halebidu
- 2018: Ahmed Romel & Allen Watts – Typhoon
- 2018: Philippe El Sisi & Ahmed Romel – Till We Meet Again
- 2019: Ahmed Romel – Sea Of Sounds
- 2019: Ahmed Romel & Driftmoon – Ars Vitae
- 2019: Ahmed Romel Feat. Jennifer Rene – Silver Lining
- 2019: Ahmed Romel & Simon O'Shine – Love Potion
- 2020: Ahmed Romel – Reverie
- 2020: Ahmed Romel – Vanya
- 2020: Ahmed Romel – Dystopia
- 2020: Ahmed Romel – Road To Vilna
- 2020: Ahmed Romel – Sudden Sympathy
- 2020: Ahmed Romel With Roxanne Emery - Don't Say Goodbye
- 2021: Ahmed Romel – Temple Of Sorrow
- 2021: Ahmed Romel - You Never Know
- 2021: Ahmed Romel - Meet Us Where The Night Ends
- 2022 : Ahmed Romel - Never Enough
- 2022 : Ahmed Romel & Christina Novelli - Lost In Love

=== Remixes ===
- 2012: Sander van Doorn pres. Purple Haze – Bliksem (Ahmed Romel 2012 Rework)
- 2012: Aiera – Dunes (Ahmed Romel 2012 Remix)
- 2012: The Noble Six – Last Departures (Ahmed Romel Remix)
- 2012: Ronny K. Vs Vasaio feat. Jakub Hubner – I'm Missing You (Ahmed Romel Remix)
- 2013: Dennis Sheperd & Cold Blue feat. Ana Criado – Fallen Angel (Ahmed Romel Remix)
- 2013: Tonny Nesse – Indestructible (Ahmed Romel Remix)
- 2013: A & Z – Gloom (Ahmed Romel Remix)
- 2013: Ruben de Ronde – For Granted (Ahmed Romel Remix)
- 2014: Talla 2XLC & Sarah Russell – Build These Walls (Ahmed Romel Remix)
- 2014: Harmonic Rush – The Dark Side of Persia (Ahmed Romel Remix)
- 2015: MaRLo feat. Christina Novelli – Hold It Together (Ahmed Romel Remix)
- 2015: Bobina feat. Shahin Badar – Delusional (Ahmed Romel Remix)
- 2016: Arman Bas – Iris (Ahmed Romel Remix)
- 2017: Roman Messer & Mhammed El Alami With Julia – Memories (Ahmed Romel Remix)
- 2018: Aly & Fila – Rebirth (Ahmed Romel Remix)
- 2020: RAM – Clockwork Orange (Ahmed Romel Remix)

=== In Compilations ===
- 2015: Ahmed Romel – Cupertino (SoundLift Remix)
- 2015: Ahmed Romel – Finally With You (Nuera Remix)
- 2015: Ahmed Romel – Finally With You (SoundLift Remix)

=== Album ===
- 2019: RÜYA (FSOE Recordings)
1. Be My Eyes
2. Dystopia
3. Vanya
4. The Love Potion (With Simon O'shine)
5. Solitude
6. Don't Say Goodbye (With Roxanne Emery)
7. Digital Nomads
8. Reverie
9. Rüya
10. Silver Lining (With Jennifer Rene)
11. Sea of Sounds
12. Forever (With Aisling Jarvis)
13. Anjara
14. Tresor (With Hazem Beltagui)
15. Ars Vitae (With Driftmoon)
16. The Eternal Peace
