= RAM (DJ) =

- Also known as: RAM
- Born: Ram Boon; 2 March 1974 (age 52)
- Origin: Amsterdam, Netherlands
- Genres: Trance music, Uplifting trance, Hard trance
- Occupations: Disc jockey, record producer
- Years active: 1995–present
- Labels: Armada Music, Grotesque Records, Black Hole Recordings, Digital Society Recordings, In Trance We Trust
- Formerly of: Bas & Ram

Ram Boon, better known by his stage name RAM, (born 2 March 1974) is a Dutch trance producer and DJ.

== Early life ==
RAM was born and raised in Amsterdam. He notes that his first introduction to electronic music and rave culture was in 1989 when he attended a show with some friends. RAM cites Jean-Michel Jarre as a core influence in his material.

== Career ==
RAM first began DJing in clubs around Amsterdam in 1995. He began producing professionally alongside Bas Abels, forming the hard trance DJ duo Bas & Ram in the 2000s. After over a decade of working together, RAM, citing the fact that the two artists had begun to drift apart personally and musically, began his solo career in 2009. His first major solo single, "RAMsterdam", was released through Armada Music, and was eventually on the list of Armin van Buuren's favorite tracks of the year. It reached #7 in the A State Of Trance Top 1000 with the Jorn van Deynhoven Remix.

Over the years, RAM continued to produce singles, including "RAMazing" (2011), "RAMbition" and "RAMplify" (2012). When speaking of his tendency to combine his name with certain words for titles on his songs, RAM states that it had started as a joke, and later became a trademark for him to use on his uplifting trance tracks.

In 2013, following the unexpected passing of his wife Amelia, RAM created the track "RAMelia - Tribute to Amelia" alongside vocalist Susana as a tribute for her. The track received heavy airplay on other trance producers' radio shows, including Armin van Buuren's A State of Trance and Aly & Fila's Future Sound of Egypt. It reached #10 in the A State Of Trance Top 1000, and it reached #2 in The Tune Of The Year 2013 with 1690 votes.

In 2015, RAM released his first full-length artist album Forever Love.

== Discography ==
=== Studio albums ===
- Forever Love (2015, Black Hole Recordings)
- Wanderlust (2023, Black Hole Recordings)

=== Singles ===
- RAMsterdam (2009)
- RAMazing (2011)
- RAMplify (2012)
- RAMbition (2012)
- Grotesque (with Alex M.O.R.P.H.) (2012)
- RAMnesia (2013)
- Ramelia (Tribute To Amelia), featuring Susana (2013)
- Epic (2014)
- Mirakuru (with Arctic Moon, 2014)
- Elijah (2015)
- Heartfelt (2015)
- Someone Like You (featuring Susana) (2015)
- Forever And A Day (featuring Stine Grove) (2016)
- RAMexico (2017)
- RAMbassador (2017)
- A Billion Stars Above (with Arctic Moon, featuring Stine Grove) (2017)
- Opus Dei (with Reorder) (2017)
- The Calling (with Darren Porter) (2017)
- Ramore (2018)
- Africa (2018)
- Rambulance (2018)
- For the One You Love (with Roger Shah featuring Natalie Gioia (2018)
- Subkonscious (with Daniel Skyver) (2018)
- Gladiator (with Exis) (2018)
- Northern Star (with Susana) (2018)
- Saving Angel (with Stine Grove) (2019)
