= Ørjan Nilsen =

Norwegian producer and DJ

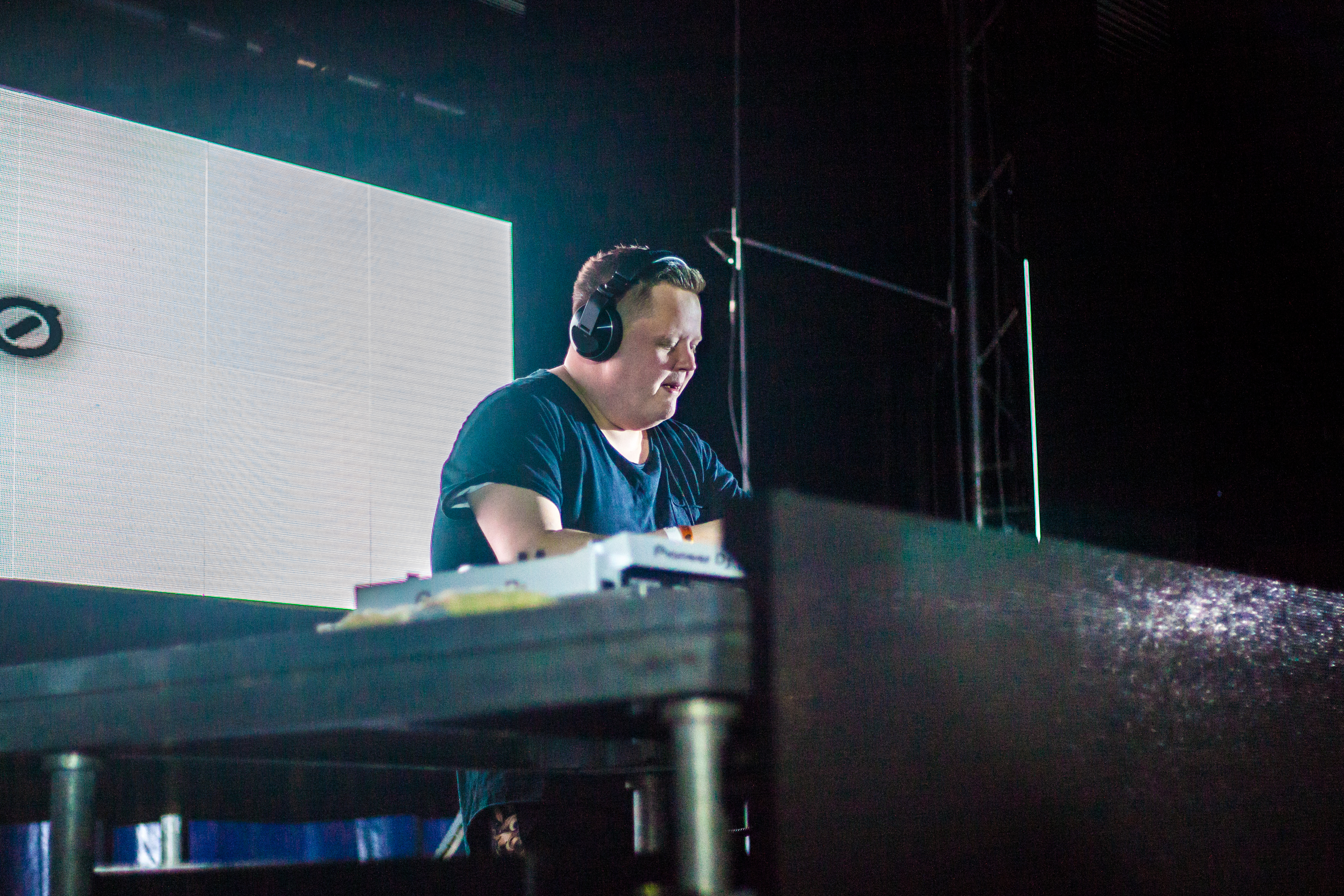
- Nilsen performing at Beats for Love (2019)

Background information
- Also known as: DJ Governor; Orion
- Born: 14 June 1982 (age 44); Kirkenes, Norway
- Origin: Norway
- Genres: Trance; house
- Occupations: DJ; producer; remixer
- Instrument: Cubase 8
- Years active: 2004–present
- Labels: Armada Music, In My Opinion Records, Sony Music, ProLogic.
- Website: http://www.orjannilsen.com/

Ørjan Nilsen (Norwegian pronunciation: [ˈø̀ːrjɑn ˈnɪ̀lsn̩]; born 14 June 1982) is a Norwegian record producer and DJ ranked inside the Top 250 DJs in his genre by the annual DJ Mag Top 100 poll. His debut studio album In My Opinion was released in 2011, followed by No Saint Out of Me in 2013 and Prism in 2018. His discography features collaborations with Armin van Buuren, Cosmic Gate, Fingerling among others.

Nilsix: Orjan Nilsen has produced and delivered a large number of singles together with Mark Sixma, who as a partner in their B2B performs as Nilsix before the public at different festivals.

== Musical career ==
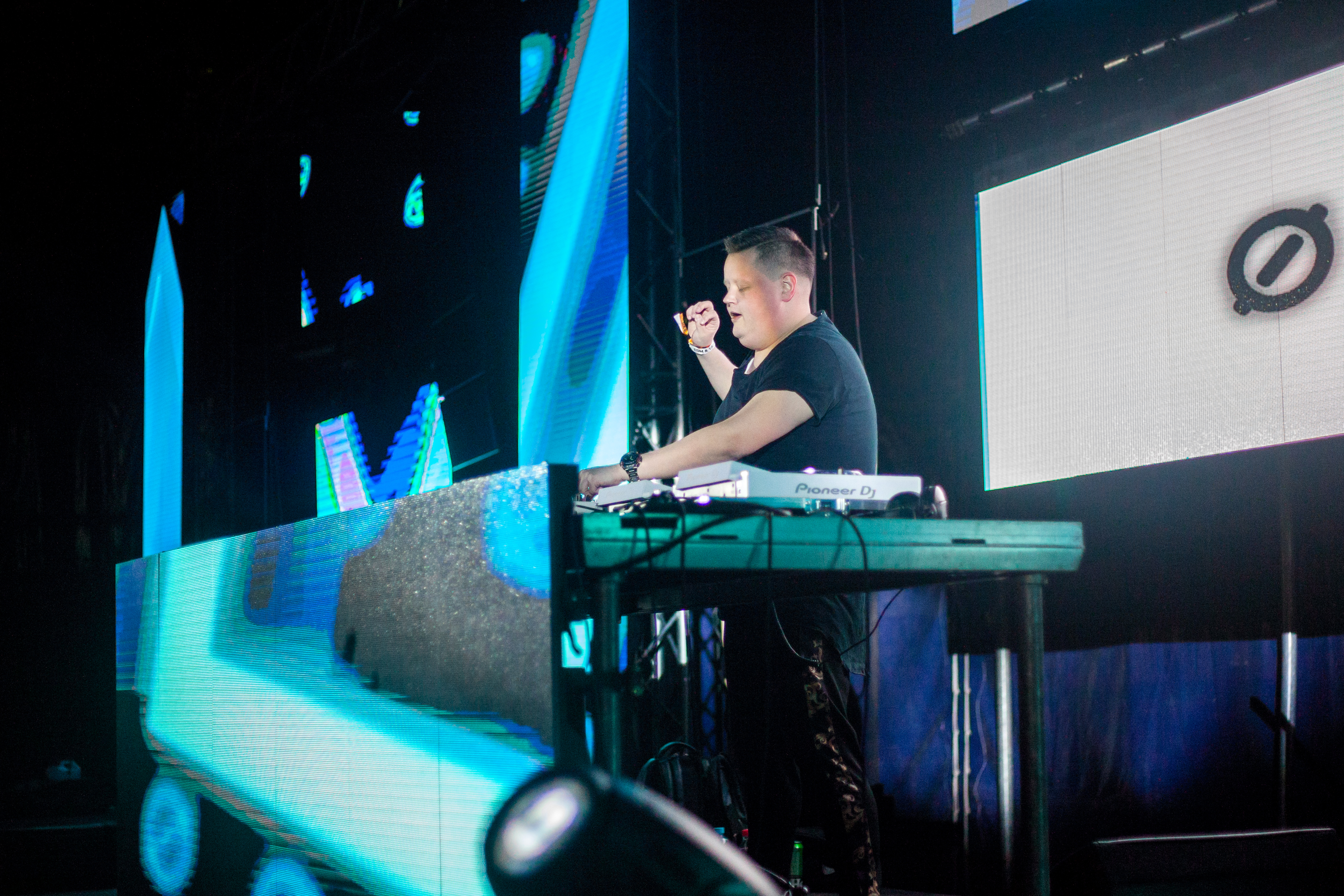
Nilsen in 2019

In 2012, Nilsen placed at Number 32 for the DJ Mag Top 100 and was nominated for Best Breakthrough DJ by IDMA.

Forming a bond with Dutch label Armada Music early in his career, his first release on the imprint was "Red Woods", a track put out in 2006 under his DJ Governor alias. Over the years Ørjan found his track, and released singles such as "La Guitarra" (2008), "Lovers Lane" and "So Long Radio" (both 2010).

In 2016, his track "Los Capos" with Colombian producer KhoMha owned the charts for more than four months, preceding his second team-up with superstar Armin van Buuren on "Flashlight".

The following year saw the release of "Iconic", which was voted #25 in the 2017 A State of Trance Tune of The Year, followed by a series of single releases from aforementioned album Prism. Meanwhile his remix of Loud Luxury's "Body" hit the 5 million streams mark in just a few months.

== Radio show / Podcast ==
Starting from 1'st of April 2020 Ørjan has his own radio show named "In My Opinion Radio". The show is broadcast live bi-weekly on Ørjan's official Facebook page and YouTube channel at 9PM (CET) and is also available as Podcast.

== Awards and nominations ==
- 2012 – Classified No. 32 on DJ Mag Top 100
- 2012 – Nominated as Break-Through DJ by IDMA
- 2013 – Classified No. 49 on DJ Mag Top 100
- 2014 – Classified No. 129 on DJ Mag Top 100
- 2018 - Classified No. 247 on DJ Mag Top 100

== Discography ==
=== Studio albums ===
- In My Opinion (2011)
- No Saint Out of Me (2013)
- Prism (2018)
- The Devil Is In The Detail (2019)

=== Singles ===
==== 2006 ====
- "Arctic Globe / Prison Break" (Intuition Recordings)
- "Red Woods" (as DJ Governor) (Captivating Sounds)
- "High Pressure" (as DJ SL) (Black Hole Recordings)

==== 2007 ====
- "Lost Once" (Ørjan vs. Octagen)
- "Orlando"
- "Beat Design / Rain" (Ørjan Nilsen pres. O&R)
- "In Fusion / Spawns"
- "Gobstice / Adamantica" (Orion)

==== 2008 ====
- "Black Mamba / Down & Dirty"
- "Scrubs / La Guitarra"

==== 2010 ====
- "Sanctuary / The Odd Number"
- "Lovers Lane"
- "So Long Radio"
- "Shoutbox!"

==== 2011 ====
- "Shades of Grey / Pale Memories" (as DJ Governor)
- "Go Fast!"
- "Mjuzik"
- "Anywhere But Here" (featuring Neev Kennedy)
- "Between the Rays / The Mule"
- "The Music Makers" (with Arnej)
- "Viking / Atchoo!"

==== 2012 ====
- "Lucky Strike / Legions"
- "Amsterdam"
- "Belter" (with Armin van Buuren)
- "Endymion"
- "Burana / Filthy Fandango"
- "PhireWorX"
- "Copperfield"

==== 2013 ====
- "No Saint Out of Me"
- "Violetta"
- "Crispy Duck" (with John O'Callaghan)
- "Drink to Forget (Chill Out Mix)"
- "Xiing"
- "Hands" (with Senadee)
- "In the Air" (with Adam Young)
- "Fable" (with Fingerling)
- "Mafioso"

==== 2014 ====
- "The Late Anthem" (Way Too Late Mix)
- "Fair Game" (with Cosmic Gate)
- "Hurricane" (feat. Christina Novelli)
- "Apart" (with Jonathan Mendelsohn)
- "W.D.I.A." (with Fingerling)
- "Carioca"
- Dirty Philty Beautiful
- "Shenanigans"

==== 2015 ====
- "The Edge"
- "Amis Ama"
- "Now We Are talking"
- "Don"
- "Too Early Anthem"
- "What It's All About" (featuring Mike James)

==== 2016 ====
- "Iconic"
- "Los Capos" (vs. KhoMha)
- "Flashlight" (with Armin van Buuren)
- "Kilowatts"

==== 2017 ====
- "Renegades" (with Jochen Miller)
- "Tradekraft"
- "Crowd Control"
- "Booya" (with Ruben de Ronde and Rodg)
- "The Hardest Part" (with Rykka)
- "Swoosh"
- "Drowning" (with IDA)
- "Hi There Radio"
- "Acid Reflux"
- "Without Kontakt"

==== 2018 ====
- "Million Miles Away"
- "Navigator"
- "In A Thousand Ways" (featuring Rykka)
- "That One Night"
- "What a Rush"
- "Savour This Moment"
- "Love Rush In"

==== 2019 ====
- "Wait 4 It"
- "Reminiscence"
- "Shriek"
- "Fomo"
- "Badoo"
- "The Chosen One"
- "Once There Were Raves"
- "Don't Need to Know Your Name"
- "Kiara"
- "1 Like You" (with Fingerling)
- "Samhain"
- "Up & Up"

==== 2020 ====
- "U Gotta" (with Fingerling)
- "Re-Election" (as DJ Governor)
- "Instinct"
- "Fearless" (with Bobby Rock featuring Anvy)
- "Sankthansaften"

==== 2021 ====
- "Volt"
- "Memoirs" (as DJ Governor)
- "Pantheon" (with Mark Sixma)
- "Poetry"

==== 2022 ====
- "Thousand Drums" (with Ang)
- "Jeger"

=== Remixes ===
==== 2006 ====
- Menno de Jong & Leon Bolier pres. Solar Express – "Magma" (Ørjan & R-Lend's Sequential Mix)
- Galen Behr vs. Hydroid – "Carabella" (Galen Behr vs. Ørjan Nilsen Remix)
- O'Callaghan & Kearney – "Exactly" (DJ Governor Remix)

==== 2007 ====
- Temple One – "Forever Searching" (Ørjan Nilsen's Synthetic Mix)
- Manual Addicts – "Siberian Dawn" (Ørjan Nilsen Remix)
- Conrad S. – "Apologies" (Ørjan Nilsen Remix)
- B.E.N. vs. Digital Nature – "Save Me God" (Ørjan Nilsen Remix)

==== 2008 ====
- Ørjan Nilsen – "La Guitarra" (Balearic Mix)
- Marcus Schössow – "The Last Pluck" (Ørjan Nilsen Remix)
- Ilya Soloviev & Paul Miller – "Lover Summer" (Ørjan Nilsen Remix)
- Mike Koglin feat. Tania Laila – "Find Me" (Ørjan Nilsen Vocal Mix)
- Rapid Eye – "Circa Forever" (Galen Behr vs. Ørjan Nilsen Remix)

==== 2009 ====
- 4 Strings feat. LeeMac – "Let Me Take Your Breath Away" (Ørjan Nilsen Remix / Dub)
- Quantic feat. Yana Kay – "Tears In The Rain" (Ørjan Nilsen Remix)
- Three Drives – "Automatic City" (Ørjan Nilsen Re-Wiz)
- Van Dresen – "Back To Start" (Ørjan Nilsen ReChunk Mix)

==== 2010 ====
- Simmons & Blanc – "Whatever It Takes" (Ørjan Nilsen Remix)
- Strobe – "Liebe" (Ørjan Nilsen Mix)
- Jonas Steur feat. Julie Thompson – "Side By Side" (Ørjan Nilsen Remix)
- Gaia – "Aisha" (Ørjan Nilsen Remix)
- Adiva – "Desired" (Ørjan Nilsen vs. Mr. Pit Repimp)

==== 2011 ====
- Whiteroom feat. Amy Cooper – "Someday" (Ørjan Nilsen Remix)
- John O'Callaghan & Timmy & Tommy – "Talk To Me" (Ørjan Nilsen Trance Mix)
- Armin van Buuren vs. Ferry Corsten – "Minack" (Ørjan Nilsen SuperChunk Remix)
- Tiddey feat. Lyck – "Keep Waiting" (Ørjan Nilsen Midsummernite Remix)
- Fingerling – "La Bella" (Ørjan Nilsen Midsummernite Mix)
- Mia Dahli – "Need You Now" (Ørjan Nilsen Remix)
- Cosmic Gate & Emma Hewitt – "Be Your Sound" (Ørjan Nilsen Remix)
- M.I.K.E. – "Back In Time" (Ørjan Nilsen Refix)
- Mark Sherry feat. Sharone – "Silent Tears" (Ørjan Nilsen Remix)
- Armin van Buuren – "Blue Fear" (Ørjan Nilsen Remix)
- Richard Durand feat. Hadley – "Run To You" (Ørjan Nilsen Trance Mix)

==== 2012 ====
- BT – "Force Of Gravity" (Ørjan Nilsen Remix)
- Christian Burns, Paul Oakenfold & JES – "As We Collide" (Ørjan Nilsen Remix)
- Dead Can Dance – "The Host Of Seraphim" (Ørjan Nilsen's ASOT 500 Intro Bootleg)

==== 2013 ====
- Armin van Buuren & Markus Schulz – "The Expedition (A State of Trance 600 Anthem)" (Ørjan Nilsen Remix)
- Push – "Universal Nation" (Ørjan Nilsen Remix)
- Armin van Buuren feat. Lauren Evans – "Alone" (Ørjan Nilsen Remix)

==== 2014 ====
- Audien feat. Michael S. – "Leaving You" (Ørjan Nilsen Remix)

==== 2015 ====
- Andrew Rayel feat. Cindy Alma – "Hold One To Your Love" (Ørjan Nilsen Remix)

==== 2016 ====
- Armin van Buuren feat. Cimo Fränkel – "Strong Ones" (Ørjan Nilsen Remix)

==== 2018 ====
- Firebeatz feat. Vertel – "Till The Sun Comes Up" (Ørjan Nilsen Remix)
- Loud Luxury feat. Brando – "Body" (Ørjan Nilsen Remix)
- Lost Frequencies feat. The NGHBRS – "Like I Love You" (Ørjan Nilsen Remix)

==== 2019 ====
- Orjan Nilsen x Dennis Sheperd x Nifra x Estiva – "Cabin Fever" (Ørjan Nilsen Club Mix)

==== 2020 ====
- BLR feat. NBLM – "Take Me Higher" (Ørjan Nilsen Remix)
- Tyron Dixon feat. Kris Kiss – "Destination" (Ørjan Nilsen Remix)
- Morgan Page & Mark Sixma – "Our Song" (Ørjan Nilsen Remix)

==== 2021 ====
- Orjan Nilsen – "Between The Rays" (Ørjan Nilsen presents DJ Governor Remix)
- Jarod Glawe – "Falling (feat. Natalie Major)" (Ørjan Nilsen Remix)
