= Alex M.O.R.P.H. =

German DJ and trance producer

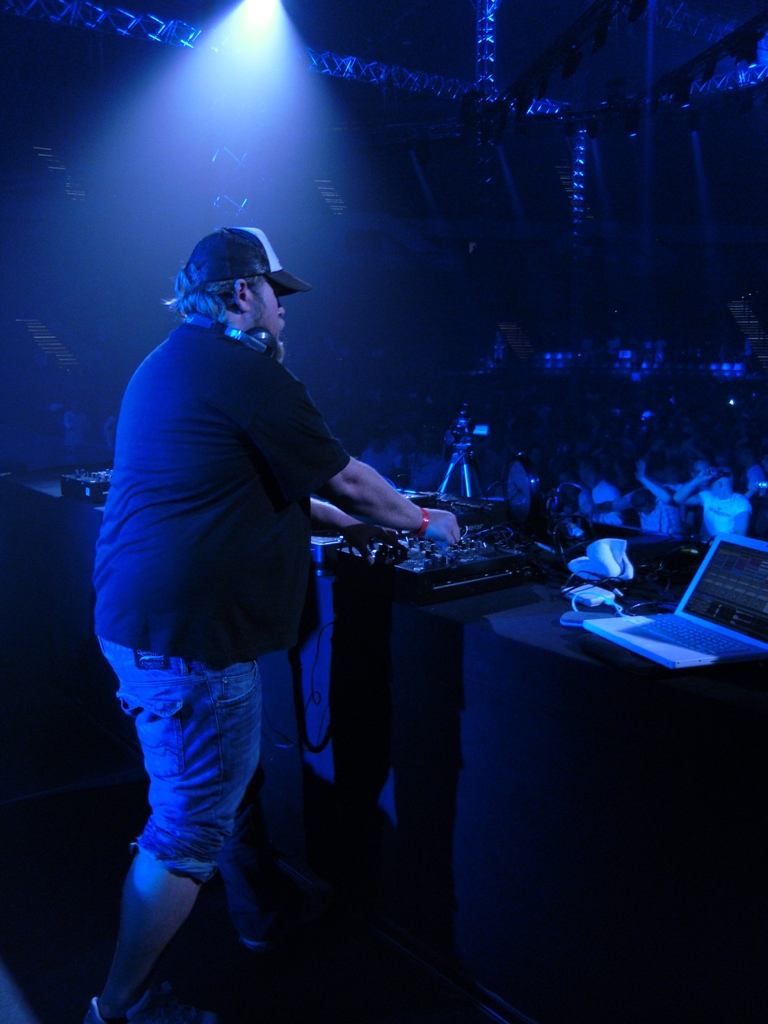
- Alex M.O.R.P.H. in 2010

Background information
- Also known as: MRPHLNDR
- Born: Alexander Mieling; 24 December 1975 (age 50)
- Origin: Germany
- Genre: Trance
- Occupations: DJ, music producer
- Years active: 1996-present
- Labels: Vandit, Armada
- Website: www.alexmorph.com

Alexander Mieling (German pronunciation: [alɛkˈsandɐ ˈmiːlɪŋ]; born 24 December 1975) better known by his stage name Alex M.O.R.P.H. [ˈalɛks ˈmɔʁf], is a German DJ and trance producer.

== Musical career ==
Mieling released his first single in 1996, titled "Paysages", on the label Seelenlandschaften. One of his first collaborations was done together with Ralf Merle, with whom he created the Badlands project. After 2000, some of his productions were released on a label called Clubbgroove Records until 2003. Starting 2007, he collaborated with Paul Van Dyk to release a track on Paul's album, which led him to sign to his label Vandit and release his first album, Purple Audio. He has released most of his non-remix work on the Vandit label, including a remixed version of Purple Audio, and has released at least 34 singles as of 2020, with about half of them being on the Vandit label. He has recorded more than 500 remixes throughout his career. For the first time, in 2009, he entered the top 100 DJs in DJ Mag, of which he earned the 99th position. In 2011, he released his first music video, called "An Angel's Love", on the Armada Music label, which was viewed 5.5 million times on YouTube and 4.3 million plays on Spotify making it his most popular work as of 2024. After the release of the music video "Angel's Love", he released his second album in 2012, called Prime Mover, on the Armada Music label.

Mieling founded a radio show called HeavensGate along with Woody van Eyden. He broadcasts weekly, and it is broadcast on more than 200 radio stations in over 50 countries and reaches more than 10 million listeners. It mainly focuses on trance music and house.

Alex M.O.R.P.H. has a new alias, MRPHLNDR, and recently performed a set on A State of Trance Episode 1177 as said alias.

== Discography ==
=== Studio albums and Singles ===
Title	Label	Year
Purple Audio	Vandit Records	2009
Sunset Boulevard feat. Ana Criado	Vandit Records	2010
Prime Mover	Armada Music	2012
Not All Superheroes Wear Capes	Vandit Records	2016

=== Compilation albums ===
Title	Label	Year
Purple Audio Reloaded	Vandit Records	2010
HeavensGate Volume 1	More Music	2010

=== DJ Mixes ===
Title	Label	Year
Russian Sessions > Volume One	World Club Music	2006
Christmas CD	M8 Magazine	2006
Technoclub Vol. 23	Klubbstyle Media	2007
Waiting for Stadium of Sound	Universal Music	2008

=== Remixes ===
Name	Title (Remix)	Label	Year
Ayumi Hamasaki	M (van Eyden and Morph Remix)	Drizzly	2003
Mat Silver and Tony Burt	Waimea (Alex M.O.R.P.H. Remix)	Above the Sky	2004
Talla 2XLC featuring Ely	The Air That I Breathe (Alex M.O.R.P.H. Remix)	Technoclub	2004
ATB featuring Tiff Lacey	Marrakech (Alex M.O.R.P.H. Remix)	Kontor Records	2004
ATB featuring Tiff Lacey	Humanity (Alex M.O.R.P.H. Remix)	Kontor Records	2005
Mindcrusher	Vision 05 (Alex M.O.R.P.H. Remix)	Fenology Records	2005
Armin van Buuren	Shivers (Alex M.O.R.P.H. Remix)	Armada Music	2005
Jochen Miller	Chromatic (Alex M.O.R.P.H. Remix)	Be Yourself Music	2006
Super8 & Tab	Helsinki Scorchin' (Alex M.O.R.P.H. Remix)	Anjunabeats	2006
Fred Baker	Forever Friends (Alex M.O.R.P.H Remix)	Baker Street Records	2006
Paul van Dyk featuring Rea Garvey	Let Go (Alex M.O.R.P.H. Remix)	Vandit Records	2007
Markus Schulz and Departures with Gabriel & Dresden	Without You Near (Alex M.O.R.P.H. Remix)	Armada Music	2007
Armin van Buuren and DJ Shah	Going Wrong (Alex M.O.R.P.H. B2B Woody van Eyden Remix)	Armada Music	2008
Quantic featuring Yana Kay	Tears in the Rain (Alex M.O.R.P.H. B2B Woody van Eyden Remix)	Enhanced Recordings	2008
Josh Gabriel presents Winter Kills	Deep Down (Alex M.O.R.P.H. Remix)	Armada Music	2009
Filo & Peri featuring Aruna	Ashley (Alex M.O.R.P.H. Remix)	Vandit Records	2009
Faithless	Sun to Me (Alex M.O.R.P.H. Remix)	PIAS Recordings	2009
Filo & Peri featuring Audrey Gallagher	This Night (Alex M.O.R.P.H. Remix)	Vandit Records	2010
Armin van Buuren featuring VanVelzen	Broken Tonight (Alex M.O.R.P.H. Remix)	Armada Music	2010
Sylvia Tosun and Bellatrax	Above All (Alex M.O.R.P.H. Remix)	Sea to Sun	2010
The Thrillseekers	Synaesthesia (Alex M.O.R.P.H. Remix)	Soundpiercing	2010
Ridgewalkers featuring El	Find (Alex M.O.R.P.H. Remix)	Armada Music	2011
Veracocha	Carte Blanche (Alex M.O.R.P.H. Remix)	Armada Music	2011
Glenn Morrison featuring Christian Burns	Tokyo Cries (Alex M.O.R.P.H. Remix)	Magik Muzik	2011
Within Temptation	Sinead (Alex M.O.R.P.H. Remix)	Armada Music	2012
Roma Pafos	One Shot (Alex M.O.R.P.H. Remix)	Mediadrive Records	2012
Tyler Sheritt	Petrichord (Alex M.O.R.P.H. Remix)	Garuda Music	2013
Shannon Hurley featuring Shannon Hurley	Monday Morning Madness (Alex M.O.R.P.H. Remix)	Armada Music	2013
Ehren Stowers	Observer (Alex M.O.R.P.H. Remix)	Serendipity Muzik	2018
Kamaya Painters	Wasteland (Alex M.O.R.P.H. Remix)	Grotesque Music	2018
Gareth Emery featuring Evan Henzi	Call to Arms (Alex M.O.R.P.H. Remix)	Garuda	2019
Roman Messer and Twin View	Dancing in the Dark (Alex M.O.R.P.H. Remix)	Suanda Music	2020
Art of Trance	Madagascar	Nocturnal Knights	2020
Madis	Desert of Lost Souls	Madis Music	2021
Ram, Susana, and Tales Of Life	You Are Enough	Nocturnal Knights Music	2021
