= Wake Me Up =

Wake Me Up may refer to:

== EPs ==
- Wake Me Up (EP), by Aloe Blacc, 2013

== Songs ==
- "Wake Me Up" (Avicii song), 2013; covered by several performers
- "Wake Me Up" (Foals song), 2021
- "Wake Me Up" (Girls Aloud song), 2005
- "Wake Me Up" (Mai Kuraki song), 2014
- "Wake Me Up" (Remy Ma song), 2017
- "Wake Me Up" (Twice song), 2018
- "Wake Me Up" (The Weeknd and Justice song), 2025
- "Wake Me Up", by B.A.P, 2017
- "Wake Me Up", by Billy Currington from Summer Forever, 2015
- "Wake Me Up", by Ed Sheeran from +, 2011
- "Wake Me Up", by Roma Pafos, 2014
- "Wake Me Up!", by Speed from Rise, 1998
- "Wake Me Up", by Taeyang from White Night, 2017
- "Wake Me Up (When This Nightmare's Over)", by Simple Plan from Harder Than It Looks, 2022

== See also ==
- Don't Wake Me Up (disambiguation)
- "Wake Me Up Before You Go-Go", a 1984 song by Wham!
- "Wake Me Up When September Ends", 2004 song by Green Day
- "Bring Me to Life", 2003 song by Evanescence
