= Quiet storm (disambiguation) =

Quiet storm is a late-night radio format.

Quiet Storm(s) or The Quiet Storm may also refer to:

== Music ==
- Quiet Storm Records, a Hawaii-based record label
- A Quiet Storm, a 1975 album by Smokey Robinson, or the title song, "Quiet Storm"
- Quiet Storm (Cockney Rejects album), 1984
- Quiet Storm (Aly & Fila album), a 2010 trance album
- Quiet Storms: Romances for Flute and Harp, a 1988 album by Michael Hoppé
- "Quiet Storm" (song), a 1999 song by Mobb Deep
- "Quiet Storm", a 2010 song by Cuban Link

== Others ==
- The Quiet Storm, a fictional radio show in some 1990s sketches on the TV program Saturday Night Live
- The Quiet Storm (film), a 2007 Icelandic drama
- Quiet Storm (wrestler), Canadian professional wrestler
- Julian Smith (boxer), nicknamed "The Quiet Storm"

== See also ==
- Silent Storm (disambiguation)
