= Don't Wake Me Up =

Don't Wake Me Up may refer to:

- Don't Wake Me Up (album), a 1999 album by The Microphones
- "Don't Wake Me Up" (Chris Brown song), a 2012 song by Chris Brown
- "Don't Wake Me Up" (Jonas Blue and Why Don't We song), a 2022 song by Jonas Blue and Why Don't We
- "Don't Wake Me Up", a 2004 single by Goldenhorse also on their Out of the Moon album
- "Don't Wake Me Up", a song by Julian Lennon from Everything Changes
- "Don't Wake Me Up", a song by McFly from All the Greatest Hits
- "Don't Wake Me Up", a song by Super Junior from Devil
- "Don't Wake Me Up", a song performed by Tuuli Okkonen at the Eurovision Song Contest 2016
- "Don't Wake Me Up, Let Me Dream", a 1925 song by Mabel Wayne

== See also ==
- Wake Me Up (disambiguation)
