= Susana (singer) =

Dutch trance music vocalist

- Born: Sanne Boomhouwer; 8 April 1984 (age 42); Aalsmeer, Netherlands
- Occupations: Singer-songwriter; Radio host
- Years active: 2005–present
- Musical career
- Genres: Trance; electronic music
- Instrument: Vocals
- Labels: Armada Music; Raznitzan Music
- Website: susanavocalist.com

Sanne Boomhouwer (born 8 April 1984 in Aalsmeer, Netherlands), who performs as Susana, is a Dutch trance music vocalist, songwriter and radio host.

== Early years ==
Boomhouwer grew up in the Amsterdam suburb of Aalsmeer and took classical singing lessons in her youth. She attended the De Brug primary school. Boomhouwer was inspired to become a songwriter after hearing Alanis Morissette's Jagged Little Pill; other inspirations include Mariah Carey and Tori Amos. As a teenager she sang in the rock band '010?, named after the classroom the band rehearsed in.

== Career ==
At age 19, a neighbor of Boomhouwer's introduced her to producers Raz Nitzan and Adrian Broekhuyse after seeing her perform live. The meeting led to her singing on "Dark Side of the Moon", a collaboration with Dutch producers Ernesto van der Meij and Edwin Koelewijn (credited as Ernesto vs. Bastian). Under the name "Susana", Boomhouwer provided guest vocals on the song "Shivers" by Armin van Buuren; the album of the same title reached the charts in the Netherlands.

Susana then signed with Armada Music. She released her solo debut, Closer, on Armada in 2010, followed by Brave in 2012. She contributed vocals to "Without You" by Egyptian trance duo Aly & Fila, and performed the song live at the pyramids of Giza in 2015. She has also provided guest vocals for Metropole Orchestra at the Tomorrowland Festival and for Rex Mundi.

Susana hosts two radio shows in which she showcases trance music, V2V and Press Play.

She won the Trance Podium Award for Best Vocalist five years in a row from 2014 to 2018.

She has ten songs listed in the top 1000 trance songs of all time, published by A State of Trance in 2021 and provided vocals for the #1 song "Shivers" and the #10 song "RAMelia". She appeared in-studio with Armin van Buuren during the ASOT 1000 broadcast, accepted an award from Armin, and performed "Shivers" live.

On September 2, 2021, she appeared in-studio with Armin Van Buuren during the ASOT 1032 broadcast in celebration of the release of his album "A State of Trance Forever". She performed their song "Home with You" live, which he included in the album as an homage to "Shivers".

In late 2021 she debuted her own record label, Susa Records.

== Discography ==
=== Albums ===
Albums
Year	Title	Publisher	Notes
2010	Closer	Armada Music	
2011	Closer (The Remixes)	Armada Music	
2011	Closer (The Extended Versions)	Armada Music	
2012	Brave	Armada Music	
2012	Brave (Extended Mixes)	Armada Music	
2014	Press Play, Vol 1	Raznitzan Music (RNM)	
2014	Press Play, Vol 2	Raznitzan Music (RNM)	
2015	Press Play, Vol 3	Raznitzan Music (RNM)	
2017	Press Play, Vol 4	Raznitzan Music (RNM)	
2021	Vocal Trance Rewind 2014-2020	Raznitzan Music (RNM)	

=== EPs ===
EPs
Year	Artist(s)	Title	Publisher	Notes
2010	Susana, Bart Claessen	If I Could	Armada Music	
2010	Susana ft. Tenishia	The Other Side	Armada Music	
2010	Susana, Mike Shiver	Give Me Faith	Armada Music	
2012	Susana, Rex Mundi	All Time Low	Armada Music	
2012	Susana, Shogun	Only You	Armada Music	
2012	Susana with Max Graham	Down to Nothing	exclusive license to Armada Music	
2012	Susana	Brave	Armada Records	
2014	Susana	Never Let You Down	Raznitzan Music (RNM)	
2018	Susana with Neev Kennedy	The Promise (The Remixes)	Raznitzan Music (RNM)	
2021	Aurosonic, Susana	Weather the Storm	Raznitzan Music (RNM)	
2021	Susana, Raz Nitzan	Fall Into Trust	Raznitzan Music (RNM)	

=== Singles and Collaborations ===
Singles and Collaborations
Year	Artist(s)	Title	Publisher	Notes
2005	Ernesto vs. Bastian	Dark Side of the Moon	High Contrast Recordings	plus 6 remixes
2005	Armin van Buuren feat. Susana	Shivers	Armada Music	
2006	Re:Locate feat. Susana	Escape		
2008	Talla 2XLC feat. Susana	I Know	Breathemusic Digital	
2008	Armin van Buuren feat. Susana	If You Should Go	Armind	
2009	Rex Mundi feat. Susana	Nothing at All	Coldharbour Recordings	
2010	Susana & Josh Gabriel	Frozen	S107 Records	Songwriter
2010	Susana & Josh Gabriel	Frozen	Armada Music	Songwriter
2010	Susana feat. Omnia & The Blizzard	Closer	S107 Records	
2010	Markus Schulz feat. Susana	Unsaid	Armada Music	
2010	Susana & Mike Shiver	Give Me Faith	Armada Music	
2010	Susana feat. Tenishia	The Other Side	Armada Music	
2010	Susana & Bart Claessen	If I Could	S107 Records	
2010	Susana feat. Dash Berlin	Wired	Armada Music	
2012	Susana & Shogun	Only You	S107 Records	
2012	Susana & Ernesto vs. Bastian with Wezz Devall	Brave	S107 Records	
2012	Susana & Rex Mundi	All Time Low	Armada Music	
2012	Susana & Max Graham	Down to Nothing	Re*Brand	
2013	Susana & RAM	RAMelia (Tribute To Amelia)	FSOE Recordings	
2013	Lange & Susana	Risk Worth Taking	Lange Recordings	
2013	Aly & Fila & Susana	Without You	FSOE Recordings	
2014	Susana & Hazem Beltagui	Silent for So Long	RazNitzanMusic (RNM)	
2014	Bobina & Susana	Play Fire with Fire	Magik Muzik	plus 6 remixes
2014	Susana	Feel You Here	RazNitzanMusic (RNM)	
2015	Susana & UCast	To Another Day	RazNitzanMusic (RNM)	
2015	Susana & RAM	Someone Like You	Black Hole Recordings	Songwriter
2015	Susana & Photographer	Find A Way	How Trance Works	
2015	Driftmoon, Thomas Coastline & Susana	Time To Say Goodbye	Driftmoon Audio (Abora Recordings)	Songwriter
2016	Aly & Fila meets Roger Shah & Susana	Unbreakable	FSOE Recordings	
2017	Susana and Neev Kennedy	The Promise	RazNitzanMusic (RNM)	
2019	Driftmoon & Susana	Because of You	Amsterdam Trance Records	Songwriter
2020	James Dymond, Susana	Is It Too Late	RazNitzanMusic (RNM)	
2020	Susana	Dark Side of the Moon (Ferry Tayle Remix)	RazNitzanMusic (RNM)	
2020	RAM, Susana, Tales of Life	You Are Enough	Nocturnal Knights Music	
2020	Armin van Buuren feat. Susana	Shivers (Marsh remix)	Armind	
2021	Armin van Buuren feat. Susana	Shivers (Mixed) (Live)	Armada Music	performed live during ASOT 1000, track 46
2021	Armin van Buuren & Susana	Home with You	Armada Music	Songwriter
2021	Armin van Buuren & Susana	Home with You (Mixed) (Live)	Armada Music	performed live during ASOT 1032, track 8
2021	Kojun & Susana	Caught in a Memory	Serendipity Muzik	
2021	Susana	A Promise I Can't Keep	Susa Records	Debut own label
2021	Richard Durand & Susana	I Matter to You	MAGIK MUSIK (Black Hole)	#40 on the A State of Trance Top 50 of 2021, and was the Service For Dreamers in ASOT 1062

Songwriter credits per the BMI Songview database.
