= Silent Storm (disambiguation) =

Silent Storm is a 2003 tactical role-playing game for the PC.

Silent Storm may also refer to:

- Silent Storm (film), a 2003 documentary by Peter Butt
- "Silent Storm" (song), a 2014 song by Carl Espen and Norway's representative in the Eurovision Song Contest 2014

== See also ==
- Quiet storm (disambiguation)
