= Quiet Storm (Aly & Fila album) =

Studio album by Aly & Fila
- Released: 28 June 2013
- Genre: Trance
- Label: Armada

Aly & Fila chronology
Rising Sun (2010)	Quiet Storm (2013)	The Other Shore (2014)

Quiet Storm is the second studio album released by Egyptian trance music duo Aly & Fila after their first album Rising Sun which was released in 2010.

The album comprises 16 tracks, including "Running Out of Time" featuring British singer Chris Jones, which was the first track to be released. The whole album was released on 28 June 2013.

== Track listing ==
No.	Title	Length
1.	"Laily (feat. Karim Youssef) (Intro)"	2:29
2.	"Running Out of Time (feat. Chris Jones)"	3:58
3.	"Mysteries Unfold (feat. Sue McLaren)"	3:52
4.	"Speed of Sound (feat. Tricia McTeague)"	4:38
5.	"Fireisland (Aly & Fila with Solarstone)"	3:35
6.	"End of the Road (feat. Jaren)"	4:12
7.	"Daydreaming (Aly & Fila vs. Arctic Moon)"	4:36
8.	"Mother Nature (feat. Rafif)"	4:29
9.	"First Sun"	4:37
10.	"Your Heart Is Mine (Aly & Fila vs. John O'Callaghan feat. Eli)"	4:02
11.	"Quiet Storm (feat. Sue McLaren)"	4:14
12.	"City of Angels"	5:12
13.	"Brilliant People (Aly & Fila and Giuseppe Ottaviani)"	5:18
14.	"Without You (Aly & Fila and Susana)"	4:29
15.	"Tula"	4:34
16.	"Where to Now (feat. Sue McLaren) (Outro)"	3:18

== Album and tour ==
The album took them three years in the making and features collaborations with other producers such as John O'Callaghan and Giuseppe Ottaviani and vocalists such as Sue McLaren, Susana, Chris Jones, Jaren and others.

A six-city tour in support of the release of Quiet Storm started on 6 June at Lima Lounge in Washington D.C. and included a stop at the Lizard Lounge in Dallas. Other events took place on 25 October at Esscala Nights in New York City and on 13 November at the Effex Nightclub in Albuquerque.

== Remixes album ==
On 18 April 2014, Aly & Fila released Quiet Storm Remixes, including 26 tracks with song remixes by different producers, such as John O'Callaghan, Bryan Kearney and Heatbeat among others.

No.	Title	Length
1.	"End of the Road (John O'Callaghan Remix)"	7:00
2.	"End of the Road (Hazem Beltagui Remix)"	7:45
3.	"Quiet Storm (Aly & Fila Club Mix)"	8:20
4.	"Mysteries Unfold (MaRLo Remix)"	6:37
5.	"Mysteries Unfold (Uplifting Mix)"	8:05
6.	"Daydreaming (Darren Porter Remix)"	6:42
7.	"Tula (A & Z Remix)"	8:38
8.	"Tula (The Noble Six Remix)"	7:35
9.	"Where to Now (Heatbeat Remix)"	4:58
10.	"Where to Now (Ferry Tayle Remix)"	7:32
11.	"Where to Now (Will Atkinson Gold Mix)"	9:22
12.	"Your Heart Is Mine (Fady & Mina Remix)"	6:44
13.	"Mother Nature (Bryan Kearney Remix)"	7:00
14.	"First Sun (Akira Kayosa & Hugh Tolland Remix)"	7:59
15.	"First Sun (Dan Stone Remix)"	7:07
16.	"Laily (Photographer Remix)"	6:57
17.	"Without You (Mohamed Ragab Remix)"	8:16
18.	"Without You (Woody van Eyden Remix)"	7:15
19.	"City of Angels (ReOrder & Ian Staderwick present SkyPatrol Remix)"	7:06
20.	"Speed of Sound (Craig Connelly Remix)"	6:27
21.	"Speed of Sound (Matt Bukovski Remix)"	6:00
22.	"Speed of Sound (Ruben de Ronde Remix)"	6:16
23.	"Speed of Sound (Sneijder Remix)"	6:33
24.	"Fireisland (Aly & Fila Uplifting Mix)"	7:59
25.	"Running Out of Time (Uplifting Mix)"	7:36
26.	"Brilliant People (Mark Sherry Remix)"	7:33

== Charts ==
Chart (2013)	Peak position
Dutch Albums (Album Top 100)	17
Belgian Albums (Ultratop Flanders)	186
