= Yana Kay =

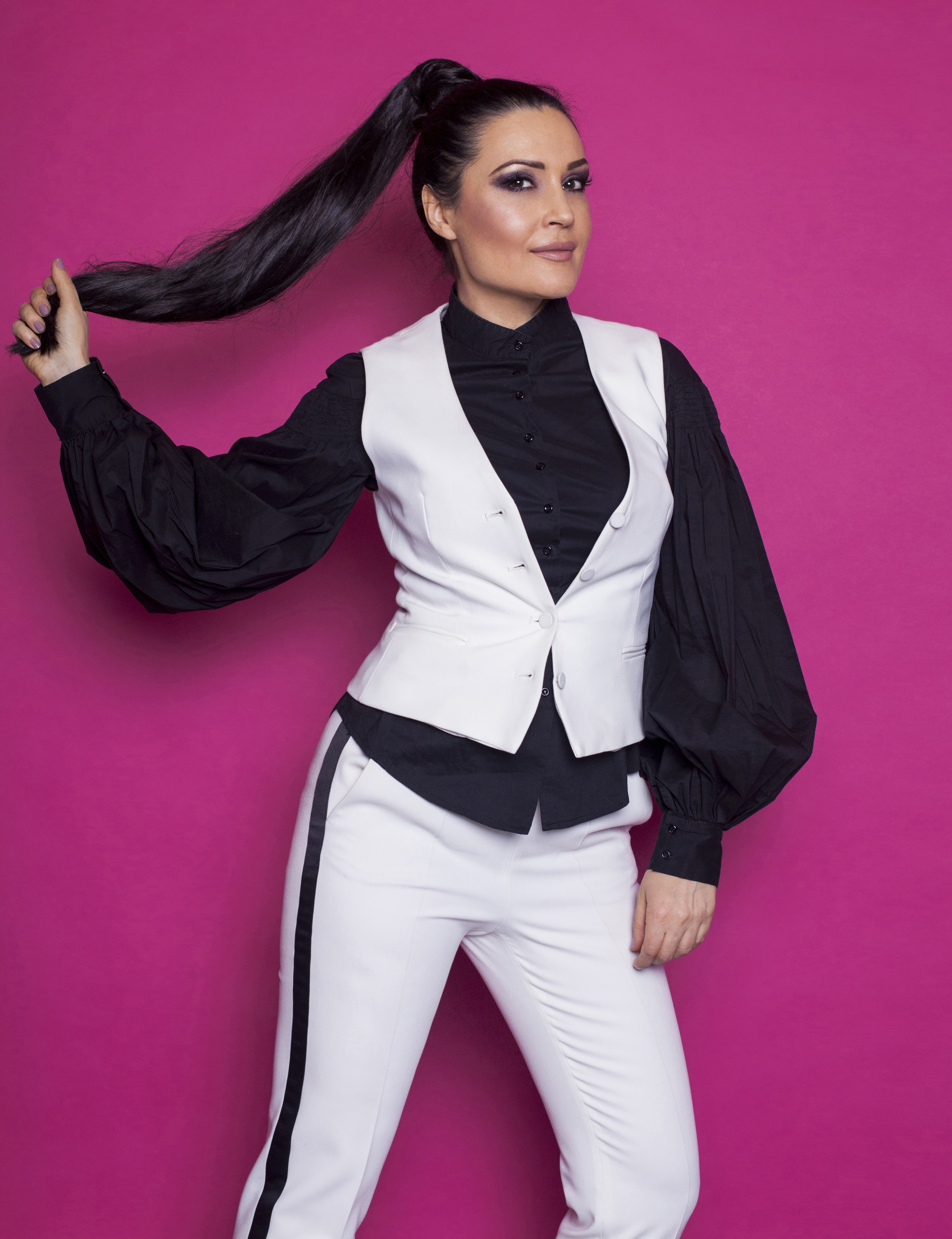

Background information
- Born: Jana Kivlenika; April 20, 1970 (age 56); Riga, Latvia
- Origin: Riga, Latvia
- Genres: Pop, D'n'B pop-rock
- Occupations: Singer, songwriter, composer
- Instrument: keyboards
- Years active: 1995–present
- Labels: Deeselecta (2002–present)
- Website: https://yanakay.com/

Jana Kivlenika (born 20 April 1970), known professionally as Yana Kay, is a Latvian-Russian singer and songwriter. Yana Kay's discography includes albums in English, Russian, Latvian, Spanish and Italian. At the international Eurovision Song Contest 2003, she represented Latvia with the song "Hello from Mars" as a member of F.L.Y., the trio. She is known for her collaboration with many international projects in the genre of Drum'n'bass, Progressive House and Trance. Together with Ilya Lagutenko and his band Mumiy Troll, she is the performer of the famous song Medveditsa ("The Bear"). She is one of the few Russian-speaking performers, whose songs got in English playlists, namely that of BBC Radio 1.

== Early life ==
Yana Kay was born on April 20, 1970, the daughter of Juris Kivleniks, born on September 13, 1948, who is Latvian by his nationality. Her mother Gita Kivlenika, born on April 2, 1947, is a nurse and Russian by nationality. Yana's parents got together, when they were very young; they met in a circus studio; both of them were keen about sports, acrobatics and gymnastics.

Very early in Yana's childhood, her mother drew attention to her daughter's musical aptitude; so at the age of 6, she sent little Yana to a music school. Since then, she learned to play piano; besides, a year later at the age of 7, she began to study in a choreographic studio, too, where she danced for 8 years. At the age of 16, after successful graduating from both the music school and the secondary school, Yana almost managed to enter the theater faculty at the Latvian Conservatory; she missed just one point to the passing score. In the same year, she entered the Riga College of Culture (now the Latvian Academy of Culture), which she graduated with honors.

Yana Kay's musical career began as early as in her high school years. She became a member of a school musical band, where she played synthesizer and at the same time she was a vocalist of this school band. After the college graduation, the guys did not give up their hobby but created a professional band; they began performing at various events. From 1990 to 1994, Yana performed in music halls in Greece.

In 1995, Yana began her professional career as a songwriter and performer by recording her first own song with Len Davies, the British sound producer.

== Career ==
(1999) She receives the award "Stopudovy hit" (abso-bloody-lute chart-topper) from the Russian radio Hit FM for the song "Baby girl" performed together with Fors, the singer. The video for the song "Baby girl" was in the rotation of MTV Russia.
(2000) For the first time, Yana Kay took part in the Latvian national selection for Eurovision. This was the year, when Latvia just began its participation in this prestigious international competition. Then, in 2000, three songs written by Kay got into the final of the national selection. In this competitive race, Yana Kay had to withdraw one of her three songs ("Watterfall"); in the competition, she was behind only Marie N and Brainstorm, the band. In this year, the audience took no part in the voting; the fate of the contestants was decided only by the jury members.
In 2000, the debut album in English was released called "Loveland".
(2001) Again Yana Kay gets into the final of the Eurovision national selection with the song of her own composition named "Falling into you".
(2002) Yana Kay releases her original album "Everything is different", where she is the author of all the songs. The album received recognition both in Latvia and abroad. Becoming a part of various remixes, the song "Remember me" from this album gained the wide popularity abroad. A special resonance was received by the version in the style of drum’n’bass. It was released on vinyl with the participation of the American label.
(2003) At her third attempt, Yana Kay wins the Eurovision national selection as a member of F.L.Y., the trio, and represents Latvia at the 48th International Eurovision Song Contest. Also, the trio included two popular Latvian singers Lauris Reiniks and Martins Freimanis. Subsequently, F.L.Y. released its studio album in English called "Never look back".
(2005) To participate in the competition Eurovision 2005 on 6 January 2005, LTV announced that the song "Your Love is My Side" written by Yana Kay, and it would be performed by the duo Creem instead of Lily.
(2006) Yana Kay releases her album in English called "Magnetic". The album contains 2 discs, one of which is arranged in the style of "progressive trance" by the British sound producer James Coyle, and the second one with the same songs is made in "house", the style, and produced by DJ Noiz.
(2008) Yana Kay won the popular in Latvia TV show "Zvaigžņu lietus" ("Star Rain") on the channel LNT. The provision of the show was the participation of professional singers in duets with non-professionals. Yana performed in a duet with Intars Resetins, the actor. Subsequently, the album in Latvian by Yana Kay and Intars Resetins was released under the title "Kaut kas starp mums..." ("Something between us").
(2016) She participated in the TV show "Izklausies redzēts", which is the Latvian version of the international TV show "Your Face Sounds Familiar" or the Russian show "One and the same!" She sang songs in the images of Patricia Kaas, Vanessa Paradis, Prince, Loreen, Róisín Murphy, Corona, Jamiroquai, Leningrad (the Russian band), etc.
(2014) Yana Kay opens the exhibition of her paintings; the name of the exhibition was Anima Viva (or "A Living Soul" in the Italian version). In the same year, she presents her new album of the same name in Italian.
(2016) Yana Kay presents her new concert program in Russian with an orchestra; she gave a series of concerts in Moscow.
(2019) By this time, Yana is the author of more than 100 original songs not only for her own repertoire but also for such young performers as Markus Riva, Dina Kina, Katya Steff, Sofia Yurova, etc. She is also a vocal teacher and producer.

== Discography ==
=== Albums ===
- (2000) Loveland
- (2002) Everything is different
- (2003) Never look back (as a member of F.L.Y.)
- (2006) Magnetic
- (2009) Kaut kas starp mums... (with participation of Intars Rešetins)
- (2012) Anima Viva
- (2024) Decadance

=== Singles ===
- (1997) My heart is your sweet home
- (1998) Let me fly with you away
- (1999) How can I forget? + Baby girl (with participation of Fors)
- (1999) I Wanna B
- (2001) Remember me
- (2002) Staraja Plastinka
- (2003) Tears in the rain
- (2003) Run away
- (2003) Hello from Mars (together with F.L.Y.)
- (2003) U & Me (together with Paul B)
- (2003) Sinergy EP (together with L.A. project)
- (2004) Remember me (together with Sunchase)
- (2004) Eyes of a perfect stranger (together with Alucard)
- (2008) Take me to your ride
- (2009) Tears in the rain (Ørjan Nilsen Remix together with Will Holland)
- (2011) Weapon (together with Setrise)
- (2011) Paloma
- (2012) Deep dive (together with Alpha Duo)
- (2013) Forbidden
- (2015) Poedem v Sochi
- (2015) Monaco
- (2019) Flame of bitter love
- (2020) Kino
- (2021) Hologram
- (2024) Telescope
- (2025) Puzzle
- (2025) October
- (2026) Sun meets the moon

=== Music videos ===
Year	Song	Director	Year	Song	Director
1999	Baby Girl (ft. Fors)	Dmitry Smirnov	2011	Hurts	Markus Riva
2001	Touch me	Dmitry Smirnov	2011	Paloma	Dmitry Smirnov
2001	Remember me (ft. Ozols)	Biotom	2002	Everything is different	Biotom
2003	Tears in the rain	Biotom	2003	Hello from Mars (F.L.Y.)	Hindrek Maasik
2010	Tev	Dmitry Smirnov	2012	Perfectly insane	Dmitry Smirnov
2012	Kad nakts	Markus Riva	2012	Quanto Tempo	Dmitry Smirnov
2013	Forbidden	Dmitry Smirnov	2019	Flame of bitter love	Dmitry Smirnov
2026	Sun meets the moon	Dmitry Smirnov			

== In advertisement ==
- (2003) Brand ambassador of the Swedish fashion house "Panos Emporio" producing swimwear
- (2005) Official symbol and Brand ambassador in the advertising company for MINI Cooper, the car, in Latvia
- (2010) Brand ambassador in the advertising company for Blend-A-Med
