= Aly & Fila =

Egyptian trance music production duo from Cairo

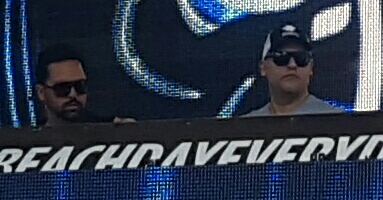
- Aly & Fila at Beachclub in May 2017

Background information
- Origin: Cairo, Egypt
- Genres: Trance; uplifting trance; vocal trance\progressive trance
- Occupations: Producers; DJs
- Instruments: Synthesizer; drum machine; equalizer
- Years active: 2003–present
- Labels: Vandit; Armada; FSOE Recordings; Black Hole
- Members: Aly El Sayed Amr Fathalah (Aly); Fadi Wassef Naguib (Fila)
- Website: alyandfila.com

Aly & Fila are an Egyptian trance music duo made up of Aly El Sayed Amr Fathalah (Aly) and Fadi Wassef Naguib (Fila). They host an internet radio show called Future Sound of Egypt, and are the founders of the label of the same name. The duo has played at events around the world, including Ultra Music Festival, Tomorrowland, Global Gathering, and Luminosity Beach Festival. Four of their tracks were chosen as "Tune of the Year" on Armin Van Buuren's show A State of Trance: "We Control the Sunlight" which featured the vocals of Jwaydan Moyine in 2011, "Unbreakable" with Roger Shah and vocals by Susana in 2016, "Somebody Loves You" which featured vocals from Plumb in 2020, and "For All Time" with Armin Van Buuren and vocals by Kazi Jay in 2021.

While both continue to produce music together, only Fadi currently goes on tour since Aly suffered a severe ear injury while performing and was advised to avoid loud music or risk losing the hearing in that ear altogether.

== History ==
Aly El Sayed Amr Fathalah (Aly) and Fadi Wassef Naguib (Fila) were both born in 1981 and have known each other since kindergarten. They began making music and DJ-ing around the age of eighteen. After hearing and enjoying the music of Paul Van Dyk, The Thrillseekers and Chicane, they built their first small studio and started producing electronic music and DJ-ing in 1999. Once they became known in Egypt, they signed with the German record label Euphonic Records in 2003. They were the first duo from Egypt that went international.

After finishing their contract with Euphonic Records, Fila met with Andy Prinz, and they launched their first sublabel of Offshore. Their first release through Offshore Music Switzerland / AP Pro Audio "Spirit of Ka" was a modest success.

The duo opened a new record label by the year 2009, naming it after the radio show, Future Sound of Egypt Recordings. The record label signed on DJs such as Sean Tyas, Arctic Moon, M.I.K.E. Push, Roger Shah, The Thrillseekers, Bjorn Akesson and Neptune Project. They have also signed other Egyptian trance DJs such as Philippe el Sisi, Mohamed Ragab, and Brave and in late 2010 the label merged with the Armada roster.

On their debut album, Rising Sun, the duo collaborated with vocalists and producers Tiff Lacey, Sue McLaren, Josie, Denise Rivera, Philippe El Sisi, Bjorn Akesson and many more.

Aly & Fila celebrated the 200th episode of their radio show Future Sound Of Egypt 200 by throwing an event in their native home of Egypt on December 2, 2011. Set to visit the chosen venue of Echo Temple in Sharm El Sheikh, the line-up included John O’Callaghan, Roger Shah, and Sied van Riel.

Aly & Fila released their second studio album, Quiet Storm, in 2013. Quiet Storm featured collaborations with Solarstone, Arctic Moon, John O'Callaghan, Giuseppe Ottaviani, and many more. They released another album, The Other Shore, which features collaborations with Ferry Tayle, Stoneface & Terminal, Roger Shah, Roxanne Emery, and others, in 2014. In 2015, the duo released The Chill Out, which consists of remixes.

== Discography ==
=== Studio albums ===
| Year | Title |
|---|---|
| 2010 | Rising Sun |
| 2013 | Quiet Storm |
| 2014 | The Other Shore |
| 2015 | The Chill Out |
| 2017 | Beyond the Lights |
| 2019 | It's All About The Melody |

=== Remix albums ===
| Year | Title |
|---|---|
| 2011 | Rising Sun (The Remixes) |
| 2014 | Quiet Storm (The Remixes) |

=== Compilations ===
| Year | Title | |
|---|---|---|
| 2008 | TranceWorld Vol. 2 | Armada |
| 2009 | Techno Club Vol. 30 (with Talla 2XLC) | Klubbstyle Media |
| 2009 | Street Parade 2009 – Trance | EMI |
| 2010 | Future Sound of Egypt Vol. 1 | Armada |
| 2011 | Summer Showcase | DJ Magazine |
| 2012 | Future Sound of Egypt Vol. 2 | Armada |
| 2014 | Trance Nation 2014 | Ministry of Sound |
| 2014 | A State of Trance 650 – New Horizons | Armada |
| 2015 | Future Sound of Egypt Vol. 3 | Armada |
| 2015 | Future Sound of Egypt 400 | Armada |
| 2016 | Armada Collected | Armada |
| 2016 | Future Sound of Egypt 450 | FSOE Recordings |
| 2017 | Future Sound of Egypt - Best of 2017 | FSOE Recordings |
| 2018 | Future Sound of Egypt 500 | FSOE Recordings |
| 2018 | Future Sound of Egypt 550 - A World Beyond | FSOE Recordings |

=== Singles ===
| Year | Title | Label |
|---|---|---|
| 2003 | Eye of Horus | Euphonic Records |
| 2004 | Spirit of Ka | Offshore Music |
| 2005 | Thebes | Offshore Music |
| 2007 | Ankh – Breath of Life (as A&F Project) | Offshore Music |
| 2007 | Uraeus (as A&F Project) | Offshore Music |
| 2007 | A Dream of Peace (with Amadeus) | Discover |
| 2008 | Key of Life | Offshore Music |
| 2008 | Dynasty | Offshore Music |
| 2008 | How Long? (featuring Jahala) | Soundpiercing |
| 2008 | Lost Language | Soundpiercing |
| 2009 | Khepera | FSOE Recordings |
| 2010 | I Can Hear You (featuring Sue McLaren) | FSOE Recordings |
| 2010 | Listening | FSOE Recordings |
| 2010 | My Mind Is With You (featuring Denise Rivera) | FSOE Recordings |
| 2011 | Still (featuring Sue McLaren) | FSOE Recordings |
| 2011 | We Control the Sunlight (featuring Jwaydan) | FSOE Recordings |
| 2011 | Paradise (featuring Tiff Lacey) | FSOE Recordings |
| 2011 | Freedom | Self-released |
| 2012 | 200 (FSOE 200 Anthem) | FSOE Recordings |
| 2012 | Coming Home (featuring Jwaydan) | FSOE Recordings |
| 2012 | Perfect Love (with Roger Shah and Adrina Thorpe) | FSOE Recordings |
| 2012 | Sand Theme(FSOE 250 Anthem) (with Bjorn Akesson) | FSOE Recordings |
| 2012 | Fireisland (with Solarstone) | Black Hole Recordings |
| 2012 | Vapourize (with John O’Callaghan) | FSOE Recordings |
| 2013 | Without You (with Susana) | FSOE Recordings |
| 2013 | The Journey (FSOE 300 Anthem) (with Fady & Mina) | FSOE Recordings |
| 2013 | Running Out Of Time (featuring Chris Jones) | FSOE Recordings |
| 2013 | Brilliant People (with Giuseppe Ottaviani) | Black Hole Recordings |
| 2013 | Mysteries Unfold (featuring Sue McLaren) | FSOE Recordings |
| 2014 | For All Time (with Jaren) | FSOE Recordings |
| 2014 | Eye 2 Eye (FSOE 350 Anthem) (with Roger Shah featuring Sylvia Tosun) | FSOE Recordings |
| 2014 | Universelab (with Stoneface & Terminal) | FSOE Recordings |
| 2014 | Nubia (with Ferry Tayle) | FSOE Recordings |
| 2014 | Full Throttle (with Sneijder) | FSOE Recordings |
| 2014 | Guardian (with Paul van Dyk featuring Sue McLaren) | Ultra Records |
| 2015 | The Other Shore (Sampler) | FSOE Recordings |
| 2015 | Napoleon (with Ferry Tayle) | FSOE Recordings |
| 2015 | Es Vedra (with The Thrillseekers) | FSOE Recordings |
| 2015 | A New Age (FSOE 400 Anthem) (with Omar Sherif and Jonathan Carvajal) | FSOE Recordings |
| 2016 | Million Voices (with Luke Bond and Audrey Gallagher) | FSOE Recordings |
| 2016 | Kingdoms (FSOE450 Anthem) (with Ahmed Romel) | FSOE Recordings |
| 2016 | Unbreakable (with Susana and Roger Shah) | FSOE Recordings |
| 2017 | Beyond The Lights | FSOE Recordings |
| 2017 | UV (with Paul Thomas) | FSOE UV |
| 2017 | The Chronicles (FSOE 500 Anthem) (with Philippe El Sisi & Omar Sherif featuring Karim Youssef) | FSOE Recordings |
| 2017 | All Heaven (with Super8 & Tab featuring Ana Criado) | FSOE Recordings |
| 2017 | Concorde (with Ferry Tayle) | FSOE Fables |
| 2017 | Camellia (with Ferry Corsten) | FSOE Recordings |
| 2017 | Shadow (with Scott Bond and Charlie Walker) | FSOE Recordings |
| 2018 | You & I (Emma Hewitt) | FSOE Recordings |
| 2018 | A World Beyond (FSOE 550 Anthem) (with Philippe El Sisi and Omar Sherif) | FSOE Recordings |
| 2018 | Surrender (with Sue McLaren) | FSOE Recordings |
| 2019 | It's All About The Melody | FSOE Recordings |
| 2019 | Gravity (with Deirdre McLaughlin) | FSOE Recordings |
| 2019 | Come Home (with Kyau & Albert) | FSOE Recordings |
| 2020 | So Protected (with Sue Mclaren) | FSOE Recordings |
| 2020 | Remember When | FSOE Recordings |
| 2020 | Plucked | FSOE Recordings |
| 2020 | Mesca Beach | FSOE Recordings |
| 2020 | Finally | FSOE Recordings |
| 2020 | I Won't Let You Fall (with Jes) | FSOE Recordings |
| 2020 | Somebody Loves You (with Plumb) | FSOE Recordings |
| 2021 | For All Time (with Armin van Buuren) (feat. Kazi Jay) | A State Of Trance |

=== Remixes ===
| Year | Title | Label |
|---|---|---|
| 2004 | Audioplacid – Diving | FlowMotion Recordings |
| 2005 | York – Iceflowers | Offshore Musi |
| 2005 | Filo & Peri meet Mike Foyle – Luana | Empire State Recordings |
| 2006 | The Thrillseekers feat. Gina Dootson – By Your Side | Adjusted Music |
| 2006 | Tatana – Interview with an Angel | Sirup |
| 2006 | Miguel Sassot – Empty | Deepblue Limited |
| 2006 | York feat. Asheni – Mercury Rising | Offshore Music |
| 2006 | Magic Island – Paradise | Deepblue Records |
| 2007 | Ben Gold feat. Senadee – Say the Words | Flux Delux |
| 2007 | Deems – Tears of Hope | Discover |
| 2007 | Lost Witness vs. Sassot – Whatever | A State Of Trance |
| 2007 | FKN feat. Jahala – Why | Deepblue records, Vandit records |
| 2007 | Mark Eteson & Jon Prior – Dynamic Stability | nu-depth Recordings |
| 2007 | DT8 Project – Hold Me Till the End | Mondo Records |
| 2007 | Andy Prinz with Naama Hillman – Quiet of Mind | Offshore Music |
| 2007 | Mr. Sam feat. Kirsty Hawkshaw – Split | Maelstrom Records |
| 2007 | Abbott & Chambers – Never After | Alter Ego Records |
| 2007 | Six Senses pres. Xposure – Niagara | Conspiracy Recordings |
| 2007 | Ben Gold – Roll Cage | Flux Delux |
| 2007 | Majera – Velvet Sun | Deepblue Records |
| 2007 | DJ Atmospherik feat. Henchman – You Owe Me | TBA |
| 2008 | Mungo – Summer Blush | A State Of Trance |
| 2008 | Armin van Buuren feat. Susana – If You Should Go | Armada |
| 2008 | DJ Shah feat. Adrina Thorpe – Back To You | Magic Island Records |
| 2008 | Filo & Peri feat. Eric Lumiere – Shine On | Vandit Records |
| 2008 | Lange feat. Sarah Howells – Out of the Sky | Maelstrom Records |
| 2008 | Rapid Eye – Circa Forever | ATCR |
| 2008 | DNS Project pres. Whiteglow – Airbourne | Monster Tunes |
| 2008 | Sunlounger feat. Zara – Lost | Magic Island Records |
| 2009 | Friends Of Street Parade – Move Your Mind | EMI |
| 2009 | Neptune Project – Aztec | FSOE Recordings |
| 2009 | FKN feat. Jahala – Still Time | Deepblue Records |
| 2009 | Sly One – This Late Stage | Discover |
| 2009 | Philippe El Sisi feat. Aminda – You Never Know | FSOE Recordings |
| 2009 | Vast Vision feat. Fisher – Everything | FSOE Recordings |
| 2010 | Leon Bolier – Shimamoto | 2 Play Records |
| 2010 | Max Graham feat. Ana Criado – Nothing Else Matters | Re*Brand |
| 2010 | Gaia – Aisha | Armada |
| 2010 | Solarstone – Touchstone | Solaris Recordings |
| 2010 | Nacho Chapado & SMAZ feat. Sue McLaren – Between Heaven and Earth | FSOE Recordings |
| 2010 | John Askew – Intimate Strangers | FSOE Recordings |
| 2011 | Sied van Riel feat. Nicola McKenna – Stealing Time | Liquid Recordings |
| 2011 | Ayumi Hamasaki – Days | Avex Trax |
| 2011 | Mandala Bros – Return To India | Mandala Beatz |
| 2011 | Bjorn Akesson & Jwaydan – Xantic | FSOE Recordings |
| 2011 | Protoculture feat. Shannon Hurley – Sun Gone Down | Armada |
| 2011 | Joel Hirsch feat. Dustin Allen – Alive | Unearthed Records |
| 2012 | Andy Moor feat. Jessica Sweetman – In Your Arms | AVA Recordings |
| 2012 | Gareth Emery feat. Christina Novelli – Concrete Angel | Garuda |
| 2012 | Alex M.O.R.P.H. feat. Hannah – When I Close My Eyes | Armada |
| 2013 | Roger Shah & Brian Laruso feat. JES – Higher Than The Sun | Magik Muzik |
| 2013 | Simon O’Shine & Sergey Nevone – Apprehension | Armada |
| 2013 | Armin van Buuren feat. Laura Jansen – Sound Of The Drums | Armada |
| 2014 | Luke Bond feat. Roxanne Emery – On Fire | Garuda |
| 2014 | Peter Santos – Under The Same Sky | Go On Air |
| 2015 | Bobina – Invisible Touch | Magik Muzik |
| 2015 | Paul van Dyk – Heart Like An Ocean | New State Music |
| 2016 | Mohamed Ragab feat. Jaren – Hear Me | FSOE Recordings |
| 2016 | Ferry Corsten – Beautiful | Flashover Recordings |
| 2018 | Roger Shah & Aisling Jarvis – Hold Your Head Up High | FSOE Recordings |
