= Temple One =

- Also known as: Joe Garrett, Tu Casa
- Born: Joe Garrett; 24 October 1986 (age 39)
- Origin: Brighton, England, United Kingdom
- Genres: Progressive trance, uplifting trance, electronica
- Occupations: DJ, music producer
- Years active: 2006-present
- Labels: Enhanced Recordings, DS-R, Subculture, Black Hole Recordings

Joe Garrett (born 24 October 1986), better known by his stage name Temple One, is an English trance DJ and music producer.

== Biography ==
Joe Garrett was born in Brighton, England on 24 October 1986.

== Musical career ==
Garrett discovered trance music around 1998-1999, through the Gatecrasher compilations. He began using cheap audio arrangement software like eJay, before moving on to more advanced software such as Cubase.

He started his career in 2006 with the first release, Eternal Light & Silent Nature, a two-track EP released by Trance Revolution Recordings. The release gained the support from Armin van Buuren's radio show A State of Trance, Ferry Corsten, Tiësto and Matt Hardwick. Following the success and exposure of the EP, Garrett was signed to the British music label group Enhanced Recordings in 2008, one the label's earliest artist discoveries.

In 2013, Garrett produced a remix of The Sun Rises In Your Eyes (Song For Heroes) by Rory Gallagher for Alter Ego Recordings. The money generated from the release was donated to wounded soldiers and their families through the British charity program Help for Heroes.

Garrett hosts a bimonthly radio show called Terminal One on the first and third Wednesdays of each month on Afterhours.FM. In addition to his music production, Garrett has also produced a series of soundsets on Freshly Squeezed Samples, containing electronic dance music presets.

== Discography ==
=== Original mixes and collaborations ===
- 2006 Eternal Light / Silent Nature Original Mixes
- 2007 Forever Searching Adam Nickey Remix, Orjan Nilsen's Synthetic Mix
- 2008 Aurora / Meridian / World Beyond Original Mixes
- 2009 Afterglow / Paradox Temple One Mixes
- 2009 String Theory Original Mix
- 2009 Betelgeuse / Escape Original Mixes and Barnes & Heatcliff Remix As Temple One presents Tu Casa
- 2009 Sahara Nights Original Mix, The Flyers & Mike Sonar Remix, Steve Brian Remix
- 2010 Autumn Leaves Part One Original, Intro and Estiva Mixes
- 2010 Autumn Leaves Part Two Club, Club Dub and DNS Project pres. Whiteglow Remix
- 2010 November Lovely Estiva Mix, Temple One Mix & Estiva's Enhanced Sessions Mix Collaboration with Estiva
- 2010 Gran Canaria Temple One & Mark Andrez Original Mix (Edit) Collaboration with Mark Andrez
- 2010 Halo Jorn van Deynhoven Remix, Temple One Remix, Jorn van Deynhoven Radio Edit, Temple One Radio Edit Collaboration with Jorn van Deynhoven
- 2010 Feel For You / Daytona Original Mixes
- 2011 Zebra Original Mix, Nuera Remix
- 2011 Walk The Line Original Mix
- 2011 Love The Fear Original Mix
- 2012 In Her Eyes Original Mix
- 2012 Aquamarine Original Mix
- 2013 Fifth Avenue / Venus Original Mixes
- 2013 Illusion Original Mix
- 2014 Unbreakable Original Mix
- 2014 Diamonds (as Tu Casa) Original Mix
- 2014 Together We Escape Original Mix, Dub
- 2015 Show Me The Stars Original Mix, Dub
- 2017 Transiberian / A Part Of Us Original Mixes, [Subculture]
- 2017 Ocean Paradise Original Mix, [DS-R Recordings]

=== Remixes ===
- 2007 Alan M - Famicom Temple 1 Remix
- 2008 Supuer - Minerva Temple One Remix
- 2008 Will B - Upgrade Temple One Remix
- 2008 Elsa Hill - Lost Temple One Remix
- 2008 Akira Kayosa - Collective Hysteria Temple One Remix
- 2008 Sundriver, Adam Stodko - Monique Temple One Remix
- 2008 ATA - Blue Skies Temple One Remix
- 2008 AF Project - Moonlight Madness Temple One Remix
- 2009 Fast Distance - Pacifica Temple One Remix
- 2009 Thomas Coastline - Love Victims Temple One Remix
- 2009 Will Holland ft. Line Frøyset - Things That Happen Temple One Remix
- 2010 D:FOLT & Paul Trainer - Empathizer Temple One Remix
- 2010 John O'Callaghan, Giuseppe Ottavani - Liquid Fire Temple One Remix
- 2010 ROMi pres. 2Spaces feat. Viktor Ginner - Into The Air Will Holland & Temple One Remix
- 2010 Stone & Young - Frozen Shores Temple One Remix
- 2010 Vast Vision & RAM - Sandwriting Temple One Remix
- 2010 Tim Preijers pres. Sense Of Shiver feat. Boom - Offshore Temple One's Ocean View Remix
- 2010 RedSound - Blue Soho Temple One Remix
- 2010 Akira Kayosa & Hugh Tolland - Surya Temple One Remix
- 2010 Miikka Leinonen - Mirabel Temple One Remix
- 2010 Ben Nicky feat. Linnea Schossow - Tears Temple One Remix
- 2010 Tritonal - Hands To Holds Me Temple One Remix
- 2010 Neptune Project vs. Luke Bond - Atlantis Temple One Remix
- 2010 Ferry Tayle - The Prestige Temple One presents Tu Casa Remix
- 2010 Talla 2xlc - Shine 2010 Temple One Remix
- 2010 Simon Latham feat. Simon Lorentzen - Heart Temple One presents Tu Casa Remix, Temple One presents Tu Casa Dub Mix
- 2011 Aiera - Aiera Temple One Remix
- 2011 Matt Skyer presents JMS - Georgia Temple One Remix
- 2011 Fast Distance & Dimension feat. Anthya - Let Me Survive Temple One Remix, Temple One Dub
- 2011 Avatar One - Jacinta's Journey Temple One Remix
- 2011 Orjan Nilsen pres. O&R - Beat Design Temple One Remix
- 2011 Aerian - Mahé Temple One Remix
- 2011 Timo Pralle - Homesick Temple One Remix
- 2011 Hudson & Kant - Coconut Temple One Remix
- 2011 Faruk Sabanci - No Way Out Temple One Remix
- 2011 Schodt & Sundriver feat. Aida Fenhel - Here With Me Temple One Bootleg Dub
- 2012 Ellie Lawson - A Hundred Ways Temple One Remix
- 2012 Tim Preijers pres. Sense Of Shiver feat. Boom - Offshore Temple One's Perfect Ten Remix
- 2012 Deepwide - Lacuna Temple One Remix
- 2012 Illuminor - That Way Temple One Remix
- 2012 Kenan Teke - Black Tulips Temple One Remix
- 2013 Rory Gallagher - The Sun Rises In Your Eyes (Song For Heroes) Temple One Remix
- 2013 Stevy Forello - Shaded Starlight Temple One Remix
- 2013 Illuminor - Sonar Temple One Remix, Temple One's Illusion Mix
- 2014 Driftmoon - Bittersweet Temple One Remix
- 2014 Mark Eteson - Aventus Temple One Remix
- 2014 Johnny Yono & Carol Lee - We Will Live Temple One Remix, Temple One Dub
- 2015 Breame feat. Fiona Reid - You Are The Sun Temple One Remix

=== Unreleased ===
- 2013 The Blizzard & Yuri Kane feat. Relyk - Everything About You Temple One Remix

=== Compilations Albums ===
- 2012 Perfect Ten
