= Arctic Moon =

Polish record producer (born 1988)

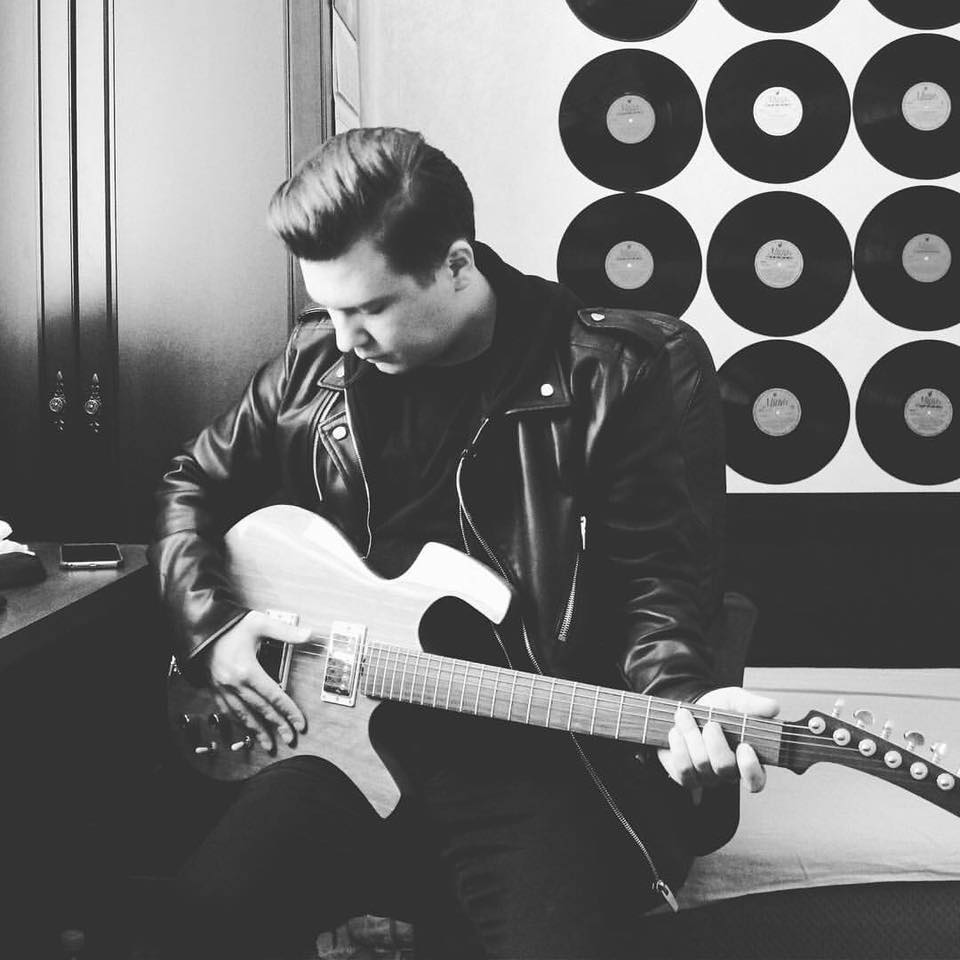

Background information
- Also known as: Arctic Moon
- Born: Tomasz Popielarski; 25 April 1988 (age 38); Szczecin, Poland
- Genres: Uplifting trance, EDM
- Occupations: Music producer, DJ
- Years active: 2007–present
- Labels: Armada Music, FSOE Recordings
- Website: www.arctic-moon.com

Tomasz Popielarski, better known as Arctic Moon (born 25 April 1988), is a Polish DJ and music producer who hails from Szczecin, Poland. In 2012 and in 2013, he ranked in the DJ Mag top 200 DJs in the world. Armin van Buuren used Arctic Moon's remixed track "Coming Home" for the remix version of the album titled "Intense - The More Intense Edition."

== Biography ==
Thomas Popielarski started producing music in late 2003 and in 2004, he began to produce dance/hard dance music under the alias of East-NRG System.

In 2007, he focused on creating uplifting and euphoric trance music encompassing elements of classical, new age, chill-out and rock music.

Arctic Moon later became synonymous with labels such as Armada Music and Aly & Fila's Future Sound of Egypt Recordings internet radio show. He released singles "True Romance" and "Adelaide" on the latter label. The tracks peaked on download charts and gained large support from other DJs.

Arctic Moon has also remixed Aly & Fila's vocal trance track "It Will Be OK", Dash Berlin's single "Till the Sky Falls Down" and Vast Vision's "Ambrosia". His other remixes were featured on labels such as Blue Soho and Arisa Audio.

== Discography ==
Albums

- 2008 Energy Reflect vs. Arctic Moon - Cold Planet

Singles

- 2008 Overnight
- 2009 Afterworld
- 2009 Arctic Moon and Truewave - On Silver Wings
- 2010 True Romance
- 2011 Adelaide
- 2012 Starships Over Alice
- 2013 Arctic Moon and Paul Webster - Valhalla
- 2013 Arctic Moon and Bryan Kearney - Dreamers & Dreams
- 2014 RAM and Arctic Moon - Mirakuru
- 2014 Arctic Moon feat. Noire Lee - Revolution
- 2015 Into The Dusk
- 2015 Arctic Moon and Apple One featuring Diana Leah - Who We Are
- 2016 Data Ghost
- 2016 Serein
- 2016 We Burn Like Stars
- 2016 Neon Nights
- 2017 Cyberpunk
- 2017 Nocturnal Horizons
- 2017 RAM and Arctic Moon with Stine Grove - A Billion Stars Above
- 2017 Arctic Moon and Purple Stories - Shadow Particles
- 2018 Dragonborn
- 2018 Digital Voices
- 2018 Annihilation
- 2019 About You
- 2019 Arctic Moon featuring Shuba - Cool in My Disaster
- 2019 Quantum Realm
- 2020 Faded Atoms
- 2020 RAM and Arctic Moon - Punkstars
- 2020 Arctic Moon featuring Jessica Lawrence - Like the Sun
- 2021 Arctic Moon & Bruno Oloviani - Fractal Wave
- 2021 Arctic Moon & Bruno Oloviani - Galactica
- 2021 Arctic Moon & Shortwave - Endless Shadows
- 2021 The Great Unknown
- 2022 Arctic Moon & Parnassvs - Become Human
- 2023 Total Simulation
- 2023 Max Van Berg - Now or Never (Arctic Moon Remix)
- 2023 Start Again
- 2024 Max Van Berg - Turn It Back (Arctic Moon Remix)
- 2025 Nightscape Frequencies
- 2025 Wasteland Synthesis
