= Roma Pafos =

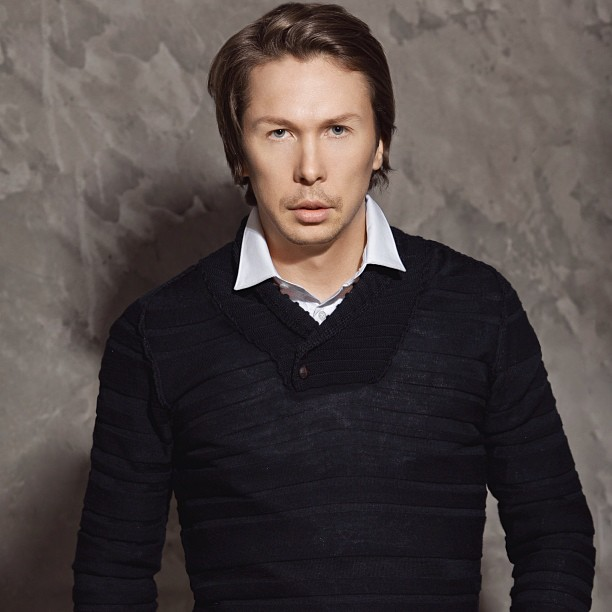

Background information
- Born: Roman Sumin; 22 August 1979 (age 46); Pskov, Russia
- Genres: electronic dance music
- Occupations: Musician, DJ, record producer, News presenter
- Years active: 2007–present
- Labels: Black Hole, Mediadrive Records, Spherax, Straight Up!, Under Pressure Records, Deeselecta
- Website: www.romapafos.com

Roma Pafos (real name Roman Sumin, August 22, 1979, Pskov, USSR) - Russian DJ and music producer. Founder and owner of Mediadrive Records label, a nominee for the best DJ in pop industry (2013) by MusicBox channel (Russia) (awarding has been held at the State Kremlin Palace); in 2013 Pafos released a single on Black Hole Recordings, formerly owned by Tiesto.

== Biography ==
Sumin Roman was born on 22 August 1979 in the city of Pskov, USSR. After graduating from high school, he entered the Faculty of Economics in Saint Petersburg State Polytechnical University.

His musical career began in 1996 under 'Hyper' alias, but after some time he changed it to Roma Pafos, where the word 'pafos' (eng. 'Pathos') is provocative for many people in modern colloquial speech. However, Pafos says that is important to understand this word with etymological meaning.

Combining study, work and music, Pafos started practice himself as a DJ, and for the first time he tried to learn basics of music writing. His first professional experience as a DJ was held in Pskov, then in Riga (Latvia), and after moving to Moscow, Roman started working as a producer.

=== Professional career ===
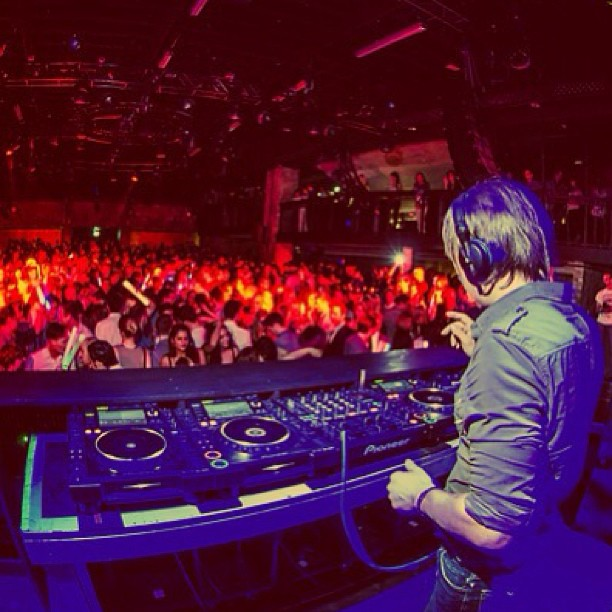
In Gibson club, Frankfurt, Germany

In 2007 Pafos created his own label Mediadrive Records, which released his first single Baraka's Violin, which was followed by several more releases on the same label. In 2012 Mediadrive Records and The first music publishing (rus. "Первое музыкальное издательство) labels have released a track called "Say Goodbye" with Sarkis Edwards.

"Say Goodbye" stayed for 15 weeks in music chart of one of the biggest dance music radio station in Russia Radio Record and then took 1st place (eventually entered the hundred of best tracks of 2012 by Radio Record), and then also took first place in the dance charts of Russia (ClipYou cHART - Muz TV), Czech Republic (Kiss Hady Radio), Latvia (TOP Radio), Romania, Peru and other countries around the world. Another single titled Better Days (recorded with Moscow Club Bangaz and Swiss singer Soul Cream) took second place in the chart of TOP Radio (Latvia) in 2013.

In 2013 Pafos also wrote a track called "Sea Drops" (rus. "Капли Моря") with Dmitriy Bikbaev (former member of Russian analogue of American Idol) which was released at Monolit label. Also in 2013 Pafos starts his partnership with Dutch Black Hole Recordings, which released Roma's single called "For A Second" (together with Sunblind).

== Radio Show ==
From 2008 to 2011 dance radio station Megapolis FM (Moscow) broadcast Roma's radio show Rhythm Of My Life. Since 2013 Pafos is author of new show called Music of Spheres.

== Interesting facts ==
In 2013 Pafos performed at Luzhniki arena in Moscow after invitation by Didier Marouani (Space band). This event was dedicated to the 30th anniversary of the first performance of Space in the USSR. Together with leader band, Pafos had created a special dance mix, consisting of Space songs and played it at the end of the show.

In 2013 Pafos also tried himself as a news presenter at MusicBox channel.

== Discography ==
=== Singles ===
- Baraka's violin (Maxi Single)
- Mute Electro (Single)
- Sexy Sexy (feat. Branbon Stone) (Maxi Single)
- In & Out (feat. Ray Issac) (Maxi Single)
- There Is (feat. Katrin Moro) (Maxi Single)
- After Long Week (feat. Kristine G) (Single)
- Love is (Single)
- The Grid (Single)
- Electric (Maxi Single)
- One Shot (Maxi Single)
- Say Goodbye (feat. Sarkis Edwards) (Maxi Single)
- For a second (feat. Sunblind) (Maxi Single)

=== Music videos ===
- Say Goodbye (feat. Sarkis Edwards) (2012) Video on YouTube
- For a second (feat. Sunblind) (2013) Video on YouTube
- Wake me up (feat. Kat Hamilton & Denis Rublev) (2014) Video on YouTube
