= The Thrillseekers =

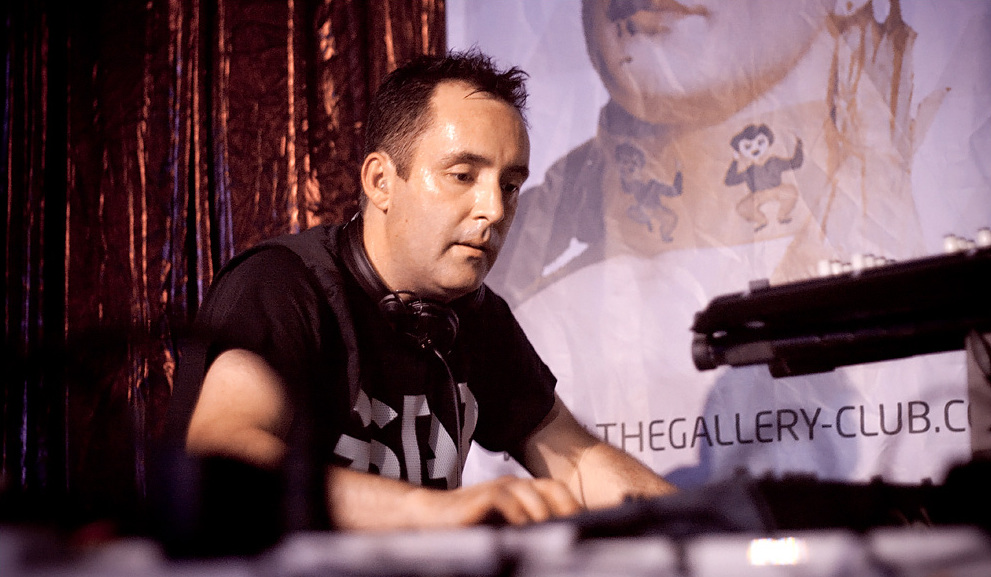
- The Thrillseekers in 2010

Background information
- Also known as: En Motion, Insigma, Rapid Eye, Morpheus and Hydra
- Born: Steve Helstrip; 21 October 1973 (age 52); York, England
- Genre: Trance
- Occupations: DJ, record producer
- Instruments: Synthesizer, drum machine
- Years active: 1999–present
- Labels: Adjusted Music, Neo, ATCR, Vandit, Positiva, FSOE
- Website: www.thethrillseekers.co.uk

Steve Helstrip, known by the stage name the Thrillseekers, is an English DJ and record producer. His debut single, "Synaesthesia", was released in 1999.

Helstrip has worked under the guises of En Motion, Insigma, Rapid Eye and Hydra. He also works in remixing, having remixed work by Tiësto, Armin van Buuren, Alizée, Ferry Corsten, Timo Maas, Sonique, Chicane, Blank & Jones, and Seb Fontaine. He owns his own record label, Adjusted Music.

== Career ==
Helstrip started out making trance music while working for the computer games developer Manic Media. Whilst living in Chipping Norton, on the Oxfordshire border, he recorded "Synaesthesia" with a home studio. When released by Neo Records in 1999, the single sold over 12,000 copies on its initial release and was heavily supported by musicians including Paul van Dyk and Paul Oakenfold. Besides the original instrumental version, Helstrip released in 2000 a club version with vocals written and performed by Sheryl Deane. This version, known as "Synaesthesia (Fly Away)", peaked at number 28 in the UK Singles Chart and was featured in the 2001 film The 51st State. The follow-up single was "Dreaming of You", which was released on Data Records in July 2002.

In late 2005, the Thrillseekers released the mix album, Nightmusic Volume 1. Volume 2 appeared in 2007.

On 25 July 2016 Future Sound of Egypt released "Amber", the first single from Hydra since Affinity (2003). It reached number 1 on Beatport Trance and number 27 on Beatport Main. Amber is the first single from his debut album Escape, which was released on 2 December 2016 through the same label.

Helstrip worked from 2017 to 2019 on an album project titled "Altered State" under his Hydra alias. The project was launched with AmplifydMusic which created a large interactive following via social media and support of Helstrip's production work. The album "Hydra – Altered State" would be released on 13 December 2019. Publication magazine Mixmag quoted Steve Helstrip "Setting the bar ridiculously high ... 9/10"

== Discography ==
=== Studio albums ===
- 2016: Escape
- 2019: Hydra – Altered State

=== DJ mixes ===
- 2005: Nightmusic Volume 1
- 2007: Nightmusic Volume 2
- 2008: Nightmusic Volume 3
- 2013: Techno Club Vol. 41 (with Talla 2XLC)

=== Singles ===
As the Thrillseekers:

- 1999 "Synaesthesia" [Neo] – UK number 81
- 2000 "Synaesthesia (Fly Away)" [Neo] – UK number 28
- 2002 "Dreaming of You" (with Alexis Strum) [Data Records] – UK number 48
- 2002 "Escape" [Adjusted]
- 2004 "NewLife" [Adjusted]
- 2005 "By Your Side" [Adjusted] - UK Dance number 29
- 2005 "Sublime" (with Ferry Corsten) [Tsunami]
- 2007 "Waiting Here For You" (featuring Aruna) [Adjusted]
- 2008 "The Last Time" (featuring Fisher) [Adjusted]
- 2008 "City of Angels" [Adjusted]
- 2010 "Savanna" [Armada]
- 2010 "Effectual" (vs M.I.K.E.) [Armada]
- 2011 "Song for Sendai" (Tribute of Japan Tsunami 2011) [Adjusted]
- 2012 "Angel" (featuring Fisher) [Adjusted]
- 2012 "Everything" (featuring Stine Grove) [Adjusted]
- 2013 "Anywhere With You" (featuring Stine Grove) [Adjusted]
- 2013 "When All Else Fails" [Adjusted]
- 2013 "Daydream" (with York & Asheni) [Adjusted]
- 2013 "Fracture" (with Talla 2XLC) [Tetsuo]
- 2014 "Like They Used To" (vs Standerwick) [Adjusted] / [Who's Afraid Of 138?!]
- 2014 "Find You" [Adjusted]
- 2014 "This Is All We Have" [Adjusted]
- 2014 "All The Little Things" (vs Sam Mitcham) [Adjusted]
- 2015 "They'll Never Know" (vs Sam Mitcham) [Adjusted]
- 2015 "Es Vedra" (vs Aly & Fila) [FSOE]
- 2016 "Just Because" [Adjusted]
- 2016 "Halcyon 2016" [FSOE]
- 2017 "Stay Here With Me" (with Shannon Hurley) [FSOE]

As Rapid Eye:

- 1999 "Alderaan" [ATCR]
- 1999 "H.E.I.G.H.T.S." [ATCR]
- 2000 "Never Going Back" [ATCR]
- 2002 "Circa Forever" [ATCR]
- 2003 "Stealing Beauty" [ATCR]
- 2004 "Santa Cruz" [ATCR]
- 2004 "Absolut" [ATCR]

As Insigma:

- 2000 "Insigma/Evolution" [ATCR]
- 2000 "Open our Eyes" [ATCR]
- 2003 "Avalon" [ATCR]

As En-Motion:

- 2000 "Truth" [IDJ]
- 2002 "Getting Away With It" [Incentive]

As Hydra:

- 2003 "Affinity" (featuring Tiff Lacey) [Discover]
- 2016 "Amber" [FSOE]
- 2020 "All That Matters" [Adjusted Music]

As Morpheus:

- 2003 'Signs/Magnetica' [Captivating Sounds]

=== Remixes ===
As the Thrillseekers:

- 1999 Free Radical – "Unity Theme" [ATCR]
- 1999 Force Majeure – "Redemption" [Additive Three]
- 1999 Rapid Eye – "Alderaan" (as Thrillseekers v. Rapid Eye) [ATCR]
- 1999 Alice Deejay – "Back In My Life" [Positiva]
- 1999 Silhouette – "Cant Wait To Find Love" [Neo]
- 1999 Cequenza – "Cequenza" (as Rapid Eye v. Thrillseekers) [Spot On]
- 1999 Compulsive – "Movin'" [Amato International]
- 1999 Digitale – "New York Doll" [Y2K]
- 1999 Chicane – "Saltwater (Ambient Mix)" [Xtravaganza]
- 1999 Taskforce – "Touch Me" [Y2K]
- 2000 Blank & Jones – "Beyond Time" [Gang Go]
- 2000 Rhythm of Life – "You Put Me In Heaven With Your Touch" [Xtravaganza]
- 2000 Ascension – "Someone" [Code Blue]
- 2000 Chicane – "Autumn Tactics" [Xtravaganza]
- 2000 Tiesto & Armin van Buuren pres. Alibi – "Eternity" [Vandit/Armind]
- 2001 Vincent de Moor – "Fly Away" [Virgin]
- 2001 Orinoko – "Island" [Positiva]
- 2002 En Motion – "Getting Away With It (Instrumental Mix)" [Incentive]
- 2002 Chicane – "Saltwater 2002 (House Mix)" [Xtravaganza]
- 2002 Matt Schwartz pres. Sholan – "Can You Feel (What I'm Going Thru)" [Ministry of Sound]
- 2003 Jan Johnston – "Calling Your Name" [Platipus]
- 2003 Alizée – "A Countre Courant" [Universal]
- 2003 Alizée – "J'en Ai Marre" (as Soft Skin) [Universal]
- 2003 Hydra – "Affinity" [Discover]
- 2004 Usual Aspect – "Mr Blue" [Motion Recordings]
- 2004 Ferry Corsten – "Sweet Sorrow" [Tsunami]
- 2004 Rapid Eye – "Circa Forever" (Ambient Mix) [ATCR]
- 2004 8 Wonders – "The Morning After" [Somatic Sense]
- 2004 Witness of Wonder – "Emotions in Motion" [ATCR]
- 2004 Evolve – "Safe To Dream" [Adjusted]
- 2004 Reflekt feat Delline Bass – "Need To Feel Loved" [Positiva]
- 2005 Pulser – "Square One" [ATCR]
- 2005 Lange ft. Kirsty Hawkshaw – "Sincere for You" (re-released 2008) [Adjusted]
- 2005 Ferry Corsten vs. The Thrillseekers – "Sublime" [Tsunami]
- 2009 Solarstone ft. Elizabeth Fields – "Part of Me" [Solaris]
- 2009 Chicane – "Poppiholla" [Armada]
- 2010 Arcane Science – "Still Feel (You Here)" [Adjusted]
- 2011 John O'Callaghan ft. Audrey Gallagher – "Bring Back The Sun" [Subculture]
- 2011 Armin van Buuren – "I Don't Own You" [Armada]
- 2020 Chicane – No Ordinary Morning [Modena Records]
- 2023 HALIENE & Elephante – Hollow [Black Hole Recordings]
- 2025 Ferry Corsten pres. Albion - Air [Armada Music]

As En-Motion:

- 1998 York – "Farewell To The Moon" [Positiva]
- 1998 Aurora – "Hear You Calling" [Additive]
- 1999 The Thrillseekers – "Synaesthesia" [Neo]
- 1999 Starparty "I'm In Love" [Incentive]
- 2000 Sonique – "It Feels So Good" [Serious]
- 2000 Free Radical – "Surreal" [ATCR]
- 2004 The Thrillseekers – "Synaesthesia 2004" (Re-edit) [Adjusted]

As Rapid Eye:

- 1999 Cequenza – "Cequenza" [Spot On]
- 1999 Compulsive – "Movin" [Spot On]
- 2000 Timo Maas – "Der Sheiber" [Perfecto]
- 2000 Blank & Jones – "The Nightfly" [Gang Go]
- 2000 Gee Motion – "Blue Angel" [Perfecto]
- 2002 Rapid Eye – "Circa Forever" [ATCR]
- 2004 Rapid Eye – "Absolut" [ATCR]
