= Bobina =

Russian DJ (born 1982)

- Born: Dmitry Almazov; 11 March 1982 (age 44); Moscow, Soviet Union
- Origin: Russia
- Genres: Trance, progressive trance
- Occupations: DJ, record producer, Remixer, Radio host
- Years active: 2003–present
- Labels: Ministry of Sound, Perfecto Records, Radio Record, Magik Muzik, Flashover Records, Loaded Records, Nebula Records, Diamond Records, Armada Music, Maelstrom
- Website: Official website

Dmitry Almazov (Russian: Дми́трий Алма́зов, IPA: [ˈdmʲitrʲɪj ɐlˈmazəf]; born 11 March 1982 in Moscow), mostly known by his stage name Bobina, is a Russian trance DJ, record producer and radio host.

== Career ==
Bobina entered the DJ scene in 2008 and became the first Russian to chart.

Bobina credits Armin van Buuren (AvB) as his entry to electronic music and his inspiration to enter trance.

He hosts a radio show on SoundCloud called Russia Goes Clubbing.

He has releases on the worlds top record labels such as Ministry of Sound, Perfecto, Armada, Sony Music & Black Hole Recordings. He has gained global popularity over the years and received support from top artists like Tiesto, Armin van Buuren, Paul Oakenfold, Ferry Corsten, and several others.

== Accomplishments ==
DJ Magazine Top 100 DJs:

- Top 100 DJ Mag 2008 — 28
- Top 100 DJ Mag 2009 — 16
- Top 100 DJ Mag 2010 — 25
- Top 100 DJ Mag 2011 — 44
- Top 100 DJ Mag 2012 — 53
- Top 100 DJ Mag 2013 — 47
- Top 100 DJ Mag 2016 — 91
- Top 100 DJ Mag 2018 — 94

TOP 100 DJ of Russia:

- Top 100 DJ 2005 — 30
- Top 100 DJ 2006 — 7
- Top 100 DJ 2007 — 6
- Top 100 DJ 2008 — 4
- Top 100 DJ 2009 — 1
- Top 100 DJ 2010 — 2
- Top 100 DJ 2011 — 1

== Discography ==
=== Albums ===
- 2004 Catchy! [Uniqode Lab]
- 2005 Beautiful Friend [Uniqode Lab]
- 2008 Again [Uniqode Lab]
- 2009 Again Remixed [Uniqode Lab]
- 2011 Rocket Ride [Uniqode Lab]
- 2013 Same Difference [Magik Muzik]
- 2015 #Uplifting [Magik Muzik]
- 2016 Speed Breaker [Magik Muzik]
- 2019 15 Years. The Best Of (Vol. 1) [Magik Muzik]
- 2019 Targets [Uniqode Lab]

=== Singles / Extended Plays ===
- 2004 'Lazy World' [Deep Blue]
- 2005 'The Russian Standard' [High Contrast Recordings]
- 2005 'September Rain' (feat. Erire) [Maelstrom]
- 2006 'Beautiful Friend/Trance For Cowboys' [Maelstrom]
- 2007 'Lighthouse' (feat. Elles de Graaf) [Maelstrom]
- 2008 'Slow' [World Club Music]
- 2008 'Spinning' [Maelstrom]
- 2009 'Invisible Touch' [Maelstrom]
- 2009 'Honestly (Ilya Soloviev Remixes)' [Maelstrom]
- 2009 'Time & Tide' [Maelstrom]
- 2009 'Where Did You Go? (First State Remixes) (with Tiff Lacey) [Maelstrom]
- 2010 'Angel Of The North' (feat. Sabrina Altan) [Maelstrom]
- 2011 'You Belong To Me' (feat. Betsie Larkin) [Maelstrom]
- 2011 'Let You In' (feat. Erin Marsz) [Maelstrom]
- 2012 'Diamond Hell' [Magik Muzik]
- 2012 'Last Train To Moscow' (with Richard Durand) [Black Hole Recordings]
- 2012 'Quattro 372' [Magik Muzik]
- 2012 'The Space Track' [Magik Muzik]
- 2012 'No Substitute for You' (feat. Betsie Larkin) [Magik Muzik]
- 2012 'Na-Na-Na' (with Vintage) [Velvet Music]
- 2013 'Slow MMXIII' [Magik Muzik]
- 2013 'Basque The Dog' [Magik Muzik]
- 2013 'Miami Echoes / Lovin' Lies' [Magik Muzik]
- 2013 'Sacramentum' (with Andrew Rayel) [Armind]
- 2013 'For Who I Am' (with Ana Criado) [Magik Muzik]
- 2013 'Rave One' (with Vigel) [Magik Muzik]
- 2013 Oil (Neft) (Smash & Vengerov & Bobina feat. Matua & Averin & Kravets) [Velvet Music]
- 2014 'Refuge' [Magik Muzik]
- 2014 'Delusional' (with Shahin Badar) [Magik Muzik]
- 2014 'Out Of Coverage' [Magik Muzik]
- 2014 'Nos Encontramos' [Magik Muzik]
- 2014 'Winter' [Magik Muzik]
- 2014 'Crunch' (with Vigel) [Protocol]
- 2014 'Still In Love' (with Christian Burns) [Magik Muzik]
- 2015 'Flying Kitten' [Magik Muzik]
- 2015 'Maharaja' [Magik Muzik]
- 2015 'iBelieve' (with JES) [Magik Muzik]
- 2015 'Addicted' (with Natalie Gioia) [Magik Muzik]
- 2015 'Love Is The Answer' (with Kyle Richardson) [Magik Muzik]
- 2016 'Music Box' [A State Of Trance]
- 2016 'My Everything' (with Natalie Gioia) [Magik Muzik]
- 2017 'Born Again' [Magik Muzik]
- 2017 'Conquerors' [Magik Muzik]
- 2017 'El Bimbo' [Magik Muzik]
- 2017 'Lazy World 2017' [A State Of Trance]
- 2018 'Something About You' [Magik Muzik]
- 2018 'The Reason' [Magik Muzik]
- 2018 'Siente' (feat. Denise Rivera) [Magik Muzik]
- 2018 'Weightlessness' [Magik Muzik]
- 2018 'Mysterious Times' (with Christina Novelli) [Magik Muzik]
- 2019 'Lost & Found' (with Natalie Gioia) [Magik Muzik]
- 2019 'Close Your Eyes' [Magik Muzik]
- 2019 'Savior' (with Christina Novelli) [Magik Muzik]
- 2019 'Autumn' [Magik Muzik]
- 2020 'Russia/China In The House' [Uniqode Lab]
- 2020 'Wild & Free' (with Natalie Gioia) [Magik Muzik]
- 2020 'You Belong to Me 2.0' (with Betsie Larkin) [Uniqode Lab]
- 2020 'Warrior' (with Cari) [Magik Muzik]
- 2020 'Ashes' (with Gid Sedgwick) [Uniqode Lab]
- 2020 'Through the Wall' (with Natalie Gioia) [Uniqode Lab]
- 2020 'After Before' (with Винтаж) [Uniqode Lab]
- 2020 'Lost' (with Natalie Gioia) [Uniqode Lab]
- 2020 'Rising Tide' (with Roxanne Emery) [Uniqode Lab]
- 2020 'The Unforgiven' [Uniqode Lab]
- 2021 'Lighthouse' (with Elles de Graaf) [Adrian & Raz]
- 2021 'Time & Tide' (with Elles de Graaf & Anne Chris) [Adrian & Raz]
- 2022 'Invisible Touch (Remixes) [Uniqode Lab]
- 2023 'Pune' (Remastered) [Uniqode Lab]
- 2023 'Lazy World' (Remastered) [Pure Trance]
- 2023 'Where Did You Go?' (with Tiff Lacey) [Uniqode Lab]
- 2023 'Cold Dreams' [Uniqode Lab]
- 2023 'Digital Space' [Uniqode Lab]
- 2023 'Mysterious Times (Ilya Soloviev Remix)' (with Christina Novelli) [Magik Muzik]

=== Remixes ===
- 2004 Envio — Time to Say Goodbye (Bobina Remix) [A State Of Trance Limited]
- 2004 Rapid Eye — Absolut (Bobina Remix) [ATCR]
- 2004 Three Drives — Air Traffic (Bobina Remix) [Nebula]
- 2004 Members Of Mayday — Sonic Empire (Bobina Remix) [World Club Music]
- 2004 Subota — Cast Away (Bobina Remix) [Bonzai Trance Progressive]
- 2005 The Thrillseekers — Synaesthesia (Bobina Megadrive 2005 Remix) [Adjusted]
- 2005 Agent Smith — Космос (Kosmos) (Bobina In Rock Remix) [Uplifto Records]
- 2005 Young Parisians feat. Ben Lost — Jump The Next Train (Bobina Remix) [Deepblue]
- 2005 Scott Bond and Solarstone — Red Line Highway (Bobina Megadrive Remix) [Made In England]
- 2005 One More Angel — Breathe (Bobina Remix) [Sirup]
- 2005 Koala — Bubblegum (Bobina Megadrive Remix) [Selective Recordings]
- 2006 Double V — Moscow Morning (Surprise Remix) [Deepblue Limited]
- 2006 George Acosta — Mellodrama (Bobina Drumma Remix) [5 AM]
- 2007 Supermode — Tell Me Why (Bobina Remix) [Ministry Of Sound]
- 2007 Marco Torrance — Stranded Feelings [No.Zilence Institute]
- 2007 Arrival & Fonarev feat. Lika Star — Kazantip 2007 [Diamond Records]
- 2008 Paul Oakenfold feat. Ryan Tedder — Not Over Yet (Bobina Remix) [Perfecto]
- 2008 Morandi — Angels (Bobina Megadrive Remix) [Universal Music]
- 2009 Freemasons feat. Sophie Ellis Bextor — Heartbreak (Make Me A Dancer) (Bobina Remix) [Loaded]
- 2009 Ferry Corsten feat. Betsie Larkin — Made of Love (Bobina Remix) [Flashover Recordings]
- 2009 Armin van Buuren feat. Cathy Burton — Rain (Bobina Megadrive Vox) [World Club Music]
- 2012 Linkin Park — Burn It Down (Bobina Remix) [Warner Music]
- 2013 Bobina with Andrew Rayel — Sacramentum (Bobina Megadrive Mix) [Armind]
- 2013 Loverush UK! & Brian Adams — Tonight In Babylon (Bobina Remix) [Black Hole Recordings]
- 2014 Armin van Buuren — Sound Of The Drums (Bobina Remix) [Armind]
- 2014 Andrew Rayel — Impulse (Bobina Remix) [Armada Music]
- 2014 Krewella — We Are One (Bobina Remix) [Sony Music]
- 2015 RAM & Susana — Someone Like You (Bobina Remix) [Black Hole Recordings]
- 2016 Betsie Larkin — We Are The Sound (Bobina Megadrive Remix) [Black Hole Recordings]
- 2016 Armin van Buuren & Tiesto pres. Major League — Wonder (Bobina In Rock Remix) [Black Hole Recordings]
- 2018 Susana & Neev Kennedy — The Promise (Bobina Remix) [RNM]
- 2018 Linkin Park — One More Light (Bobina Remix) [WMG]
- 2018 Marcel Woods — Tomorrow (Bobina Remix) [High Contrast]
- 2019 Sash! — Adelante (Bobina Megadrive Mix) [High Fashion]
- 2020 Christina Novelli - Numb (Bobina Remix) [Music Music]
- 2023 Ilya Soloviev - Universal Universe (Bobina Chill Night Mix) [Uniqode Lab]
