= Transmission (festival) =

Trance music festival in Prague, Czechia

Transmission Festival
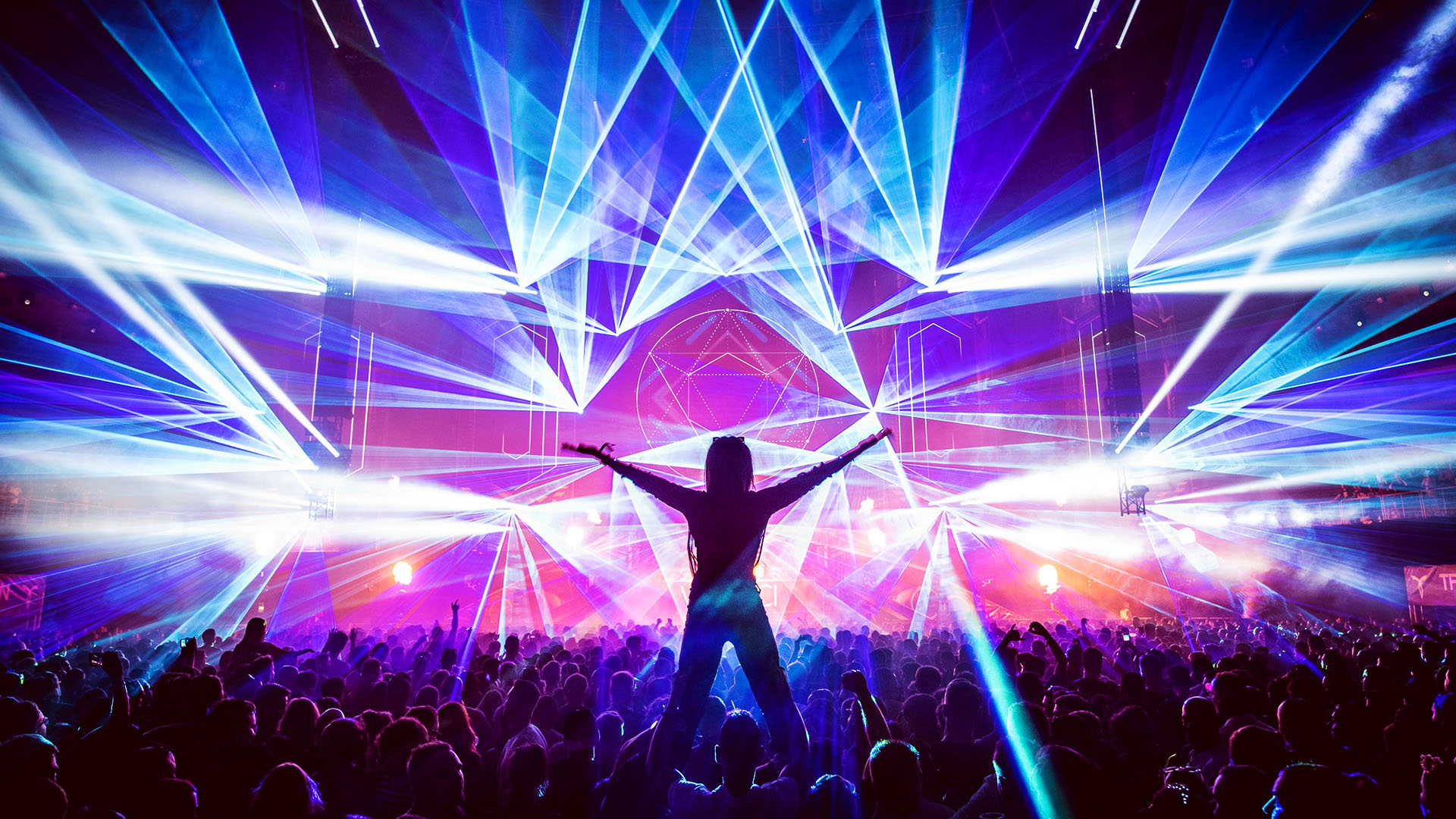
- Genre: Trance, psytrance, tech trance, progressive trance, uplifting trance
- Locations: Prague, Czech Republic (since 2006) Bratislava, Slovakia (2014) Melbourne, Australia (2016, 2017, 2022, 2024) Sydney, Australia (2019, 2020, 2023) Bangkok, Thailand (2017, 2018, 2023, 2024) Shanghai, China (2018) Airbeat One, Germany (2018) Gdańsk, Poland (2022, 2023) Arnhem, Netherlands (2023, 2025) Dance Valley, Netherlands (2025)
- Years active: 2006 – present
- Founders: United Music Events
- Website: TransmissionFestival.com

Transmission Festival (also known as Transmission) is a large indoor trance music event originally based in Prague, Czech Republic at the O2 Arena. In March 2014, the festival was held for the first time in Bratislava, Slovakia. Leaving Europe's shores for the first time, in July 2016 the festival was held in Melbourne, Australia. In March 2017 the festival extended further by visiting Bangkok, Thailand and returned to Melbourne, Australia in September. In 2018, the festival returned to Bangkok, Thailand, hosted two days at Germany's AirBeat One Festival near Neustadt-Glewe, and debuted in Shanghai for its first edition in China. In March 2019, the festival returned to Australia at a new location at Sydney Showground. In October 2022, the festival debuted in Gdańsk, Poland at the Ergo Arena. In December 2023, the festival took place in its biggest venue to date at GelreDome in Arnhem, Netherlands, to which it returns on 12th April 2025. On the 9th August 2025, Transmission will host a stage at Dance Valley Festival in Netherlands.

Transmission Festival famous for its spectacular lights and laser show. Markus Schulz, Paul van Dyk, Ferry Corsten, Giuseppe Ottaviani, Above & Beyond, Vini Vici, Cosmic Gate and MaRLo frequently headline the festival around the world.

In 2022, the organizer of Transmission Festival, United Music Events, introduced 2 brand new events: Techmission Festival (techno, melodic techno) and Hardmission Festival (hardstyle, hardcore), both of them presenting its own theme for each edition and spectacular audiovisual experience.

== Gallery ==
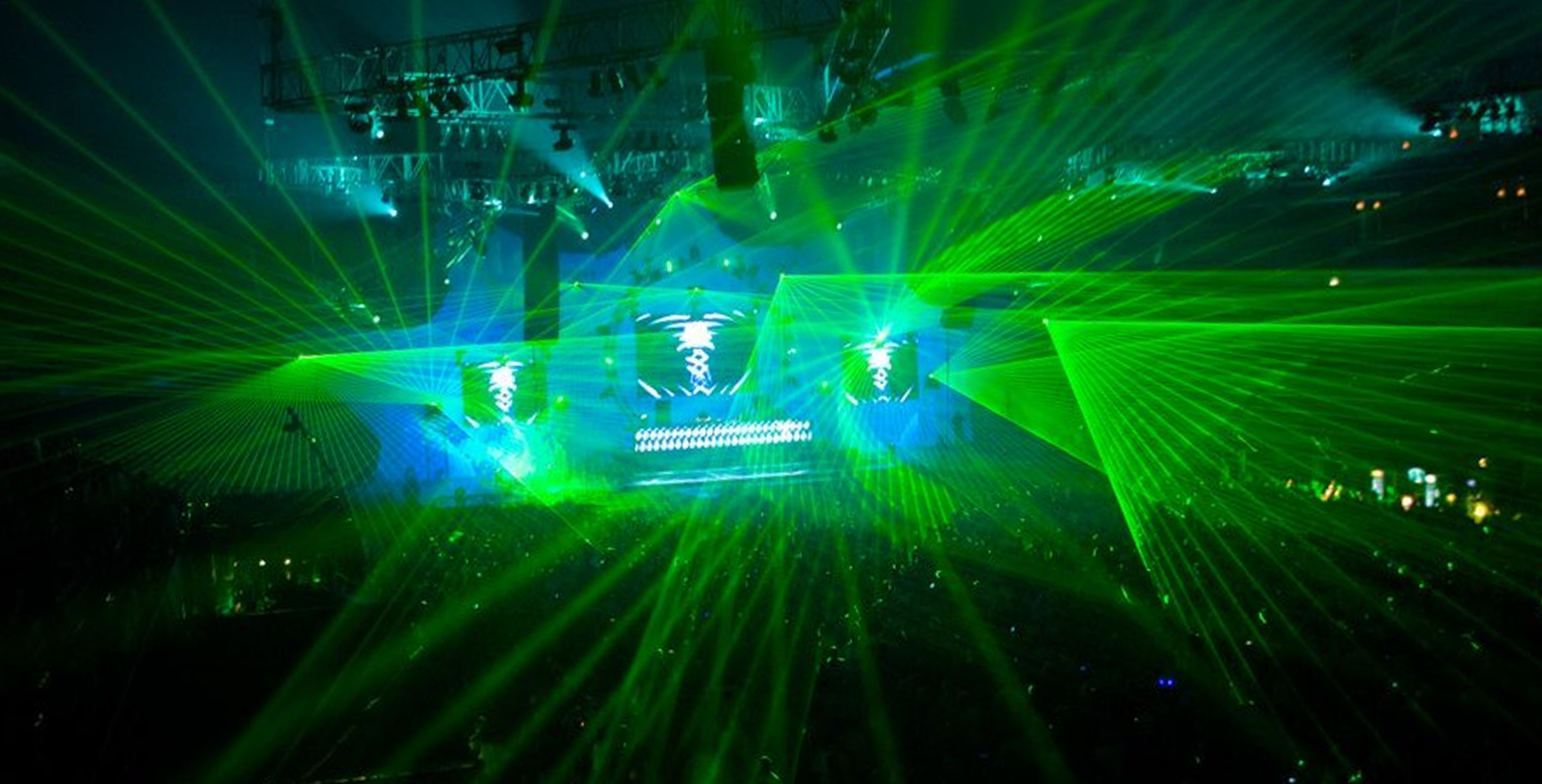
Transmission Prague 2007

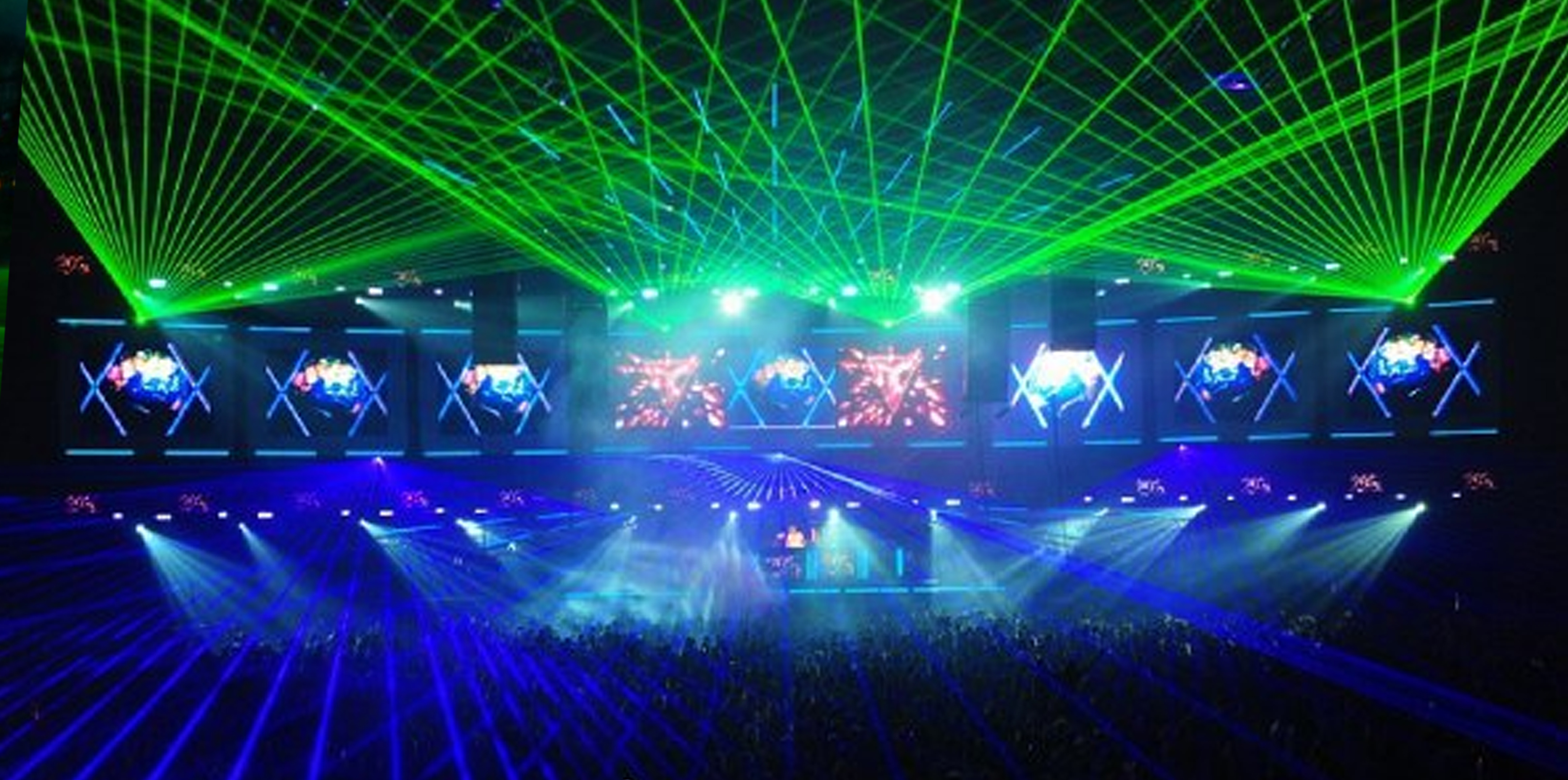
Transmission Prague 2008

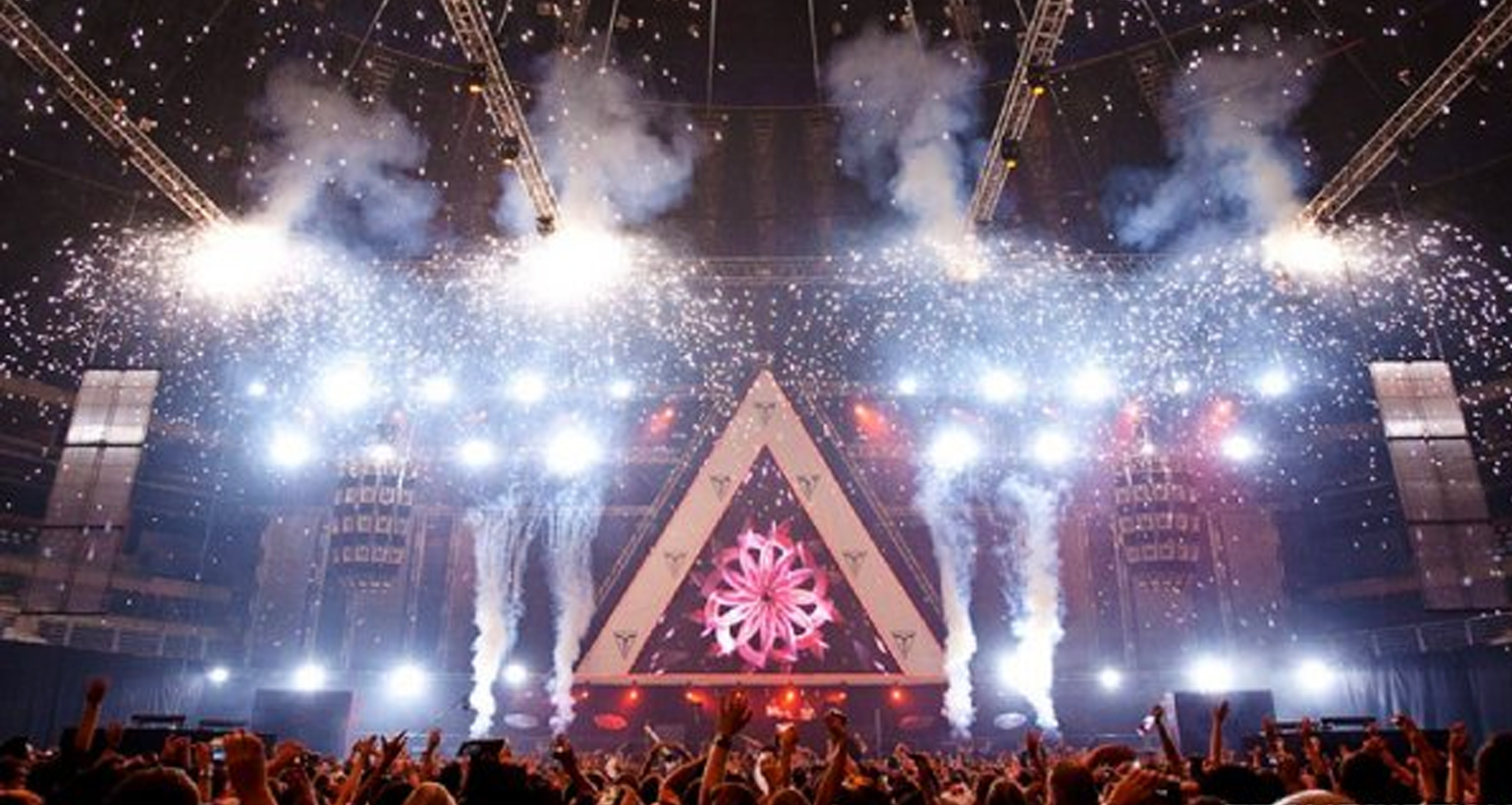
Transmission Prague 2009

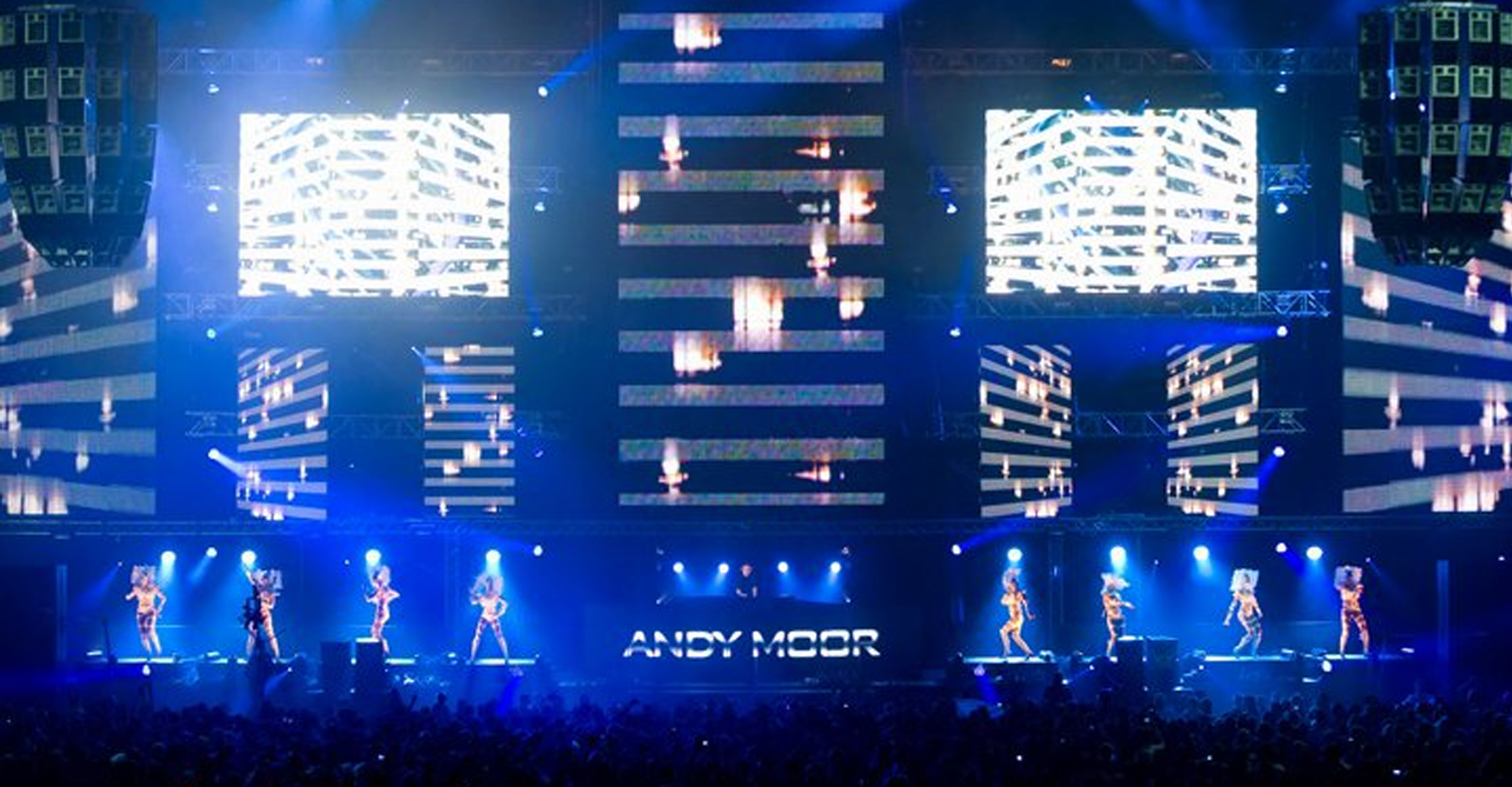
Transmission Prague 2010

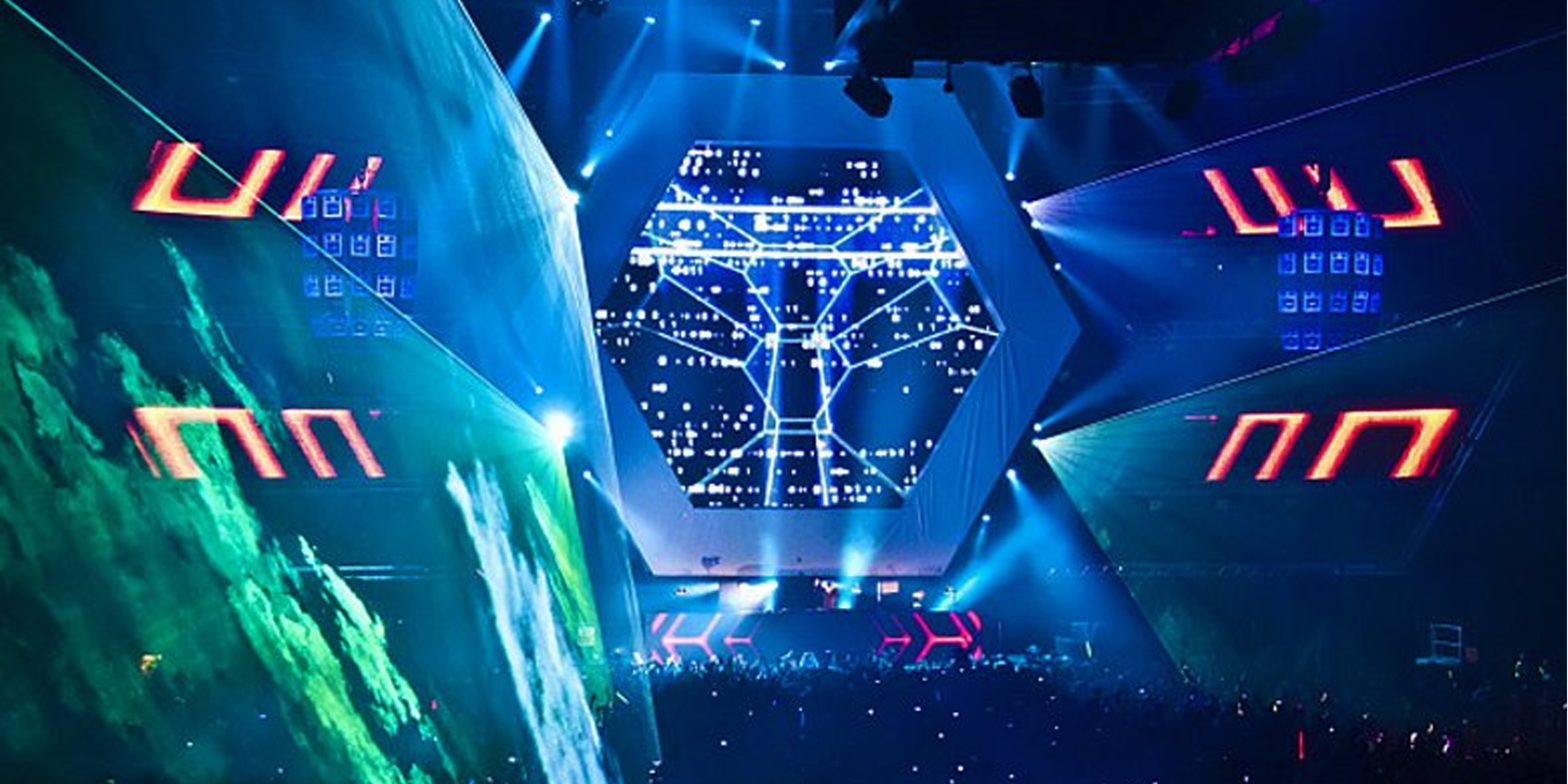
Transmission Prague 2011

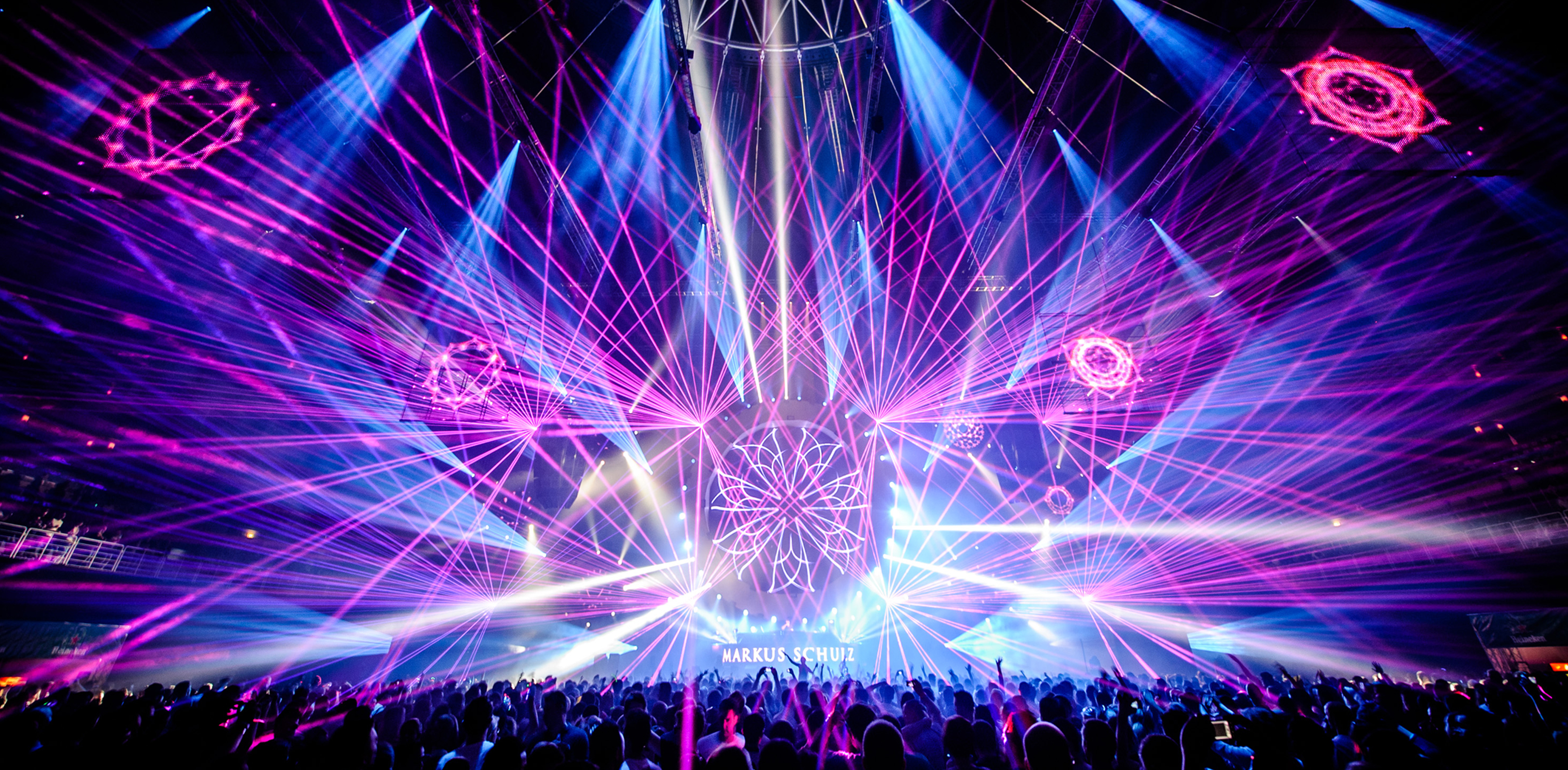
Transmission Prague 2012

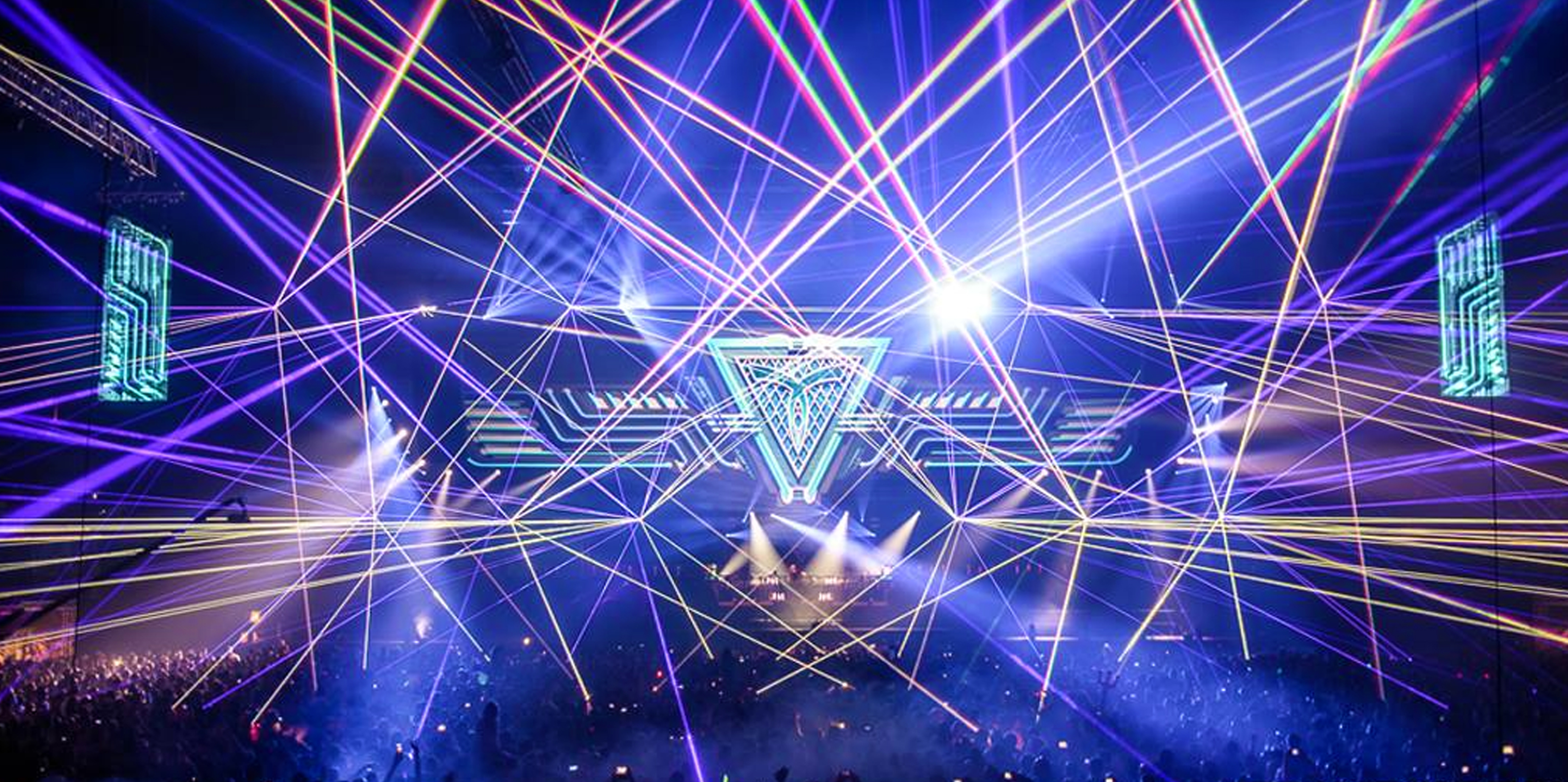
Transmission Prague 2013

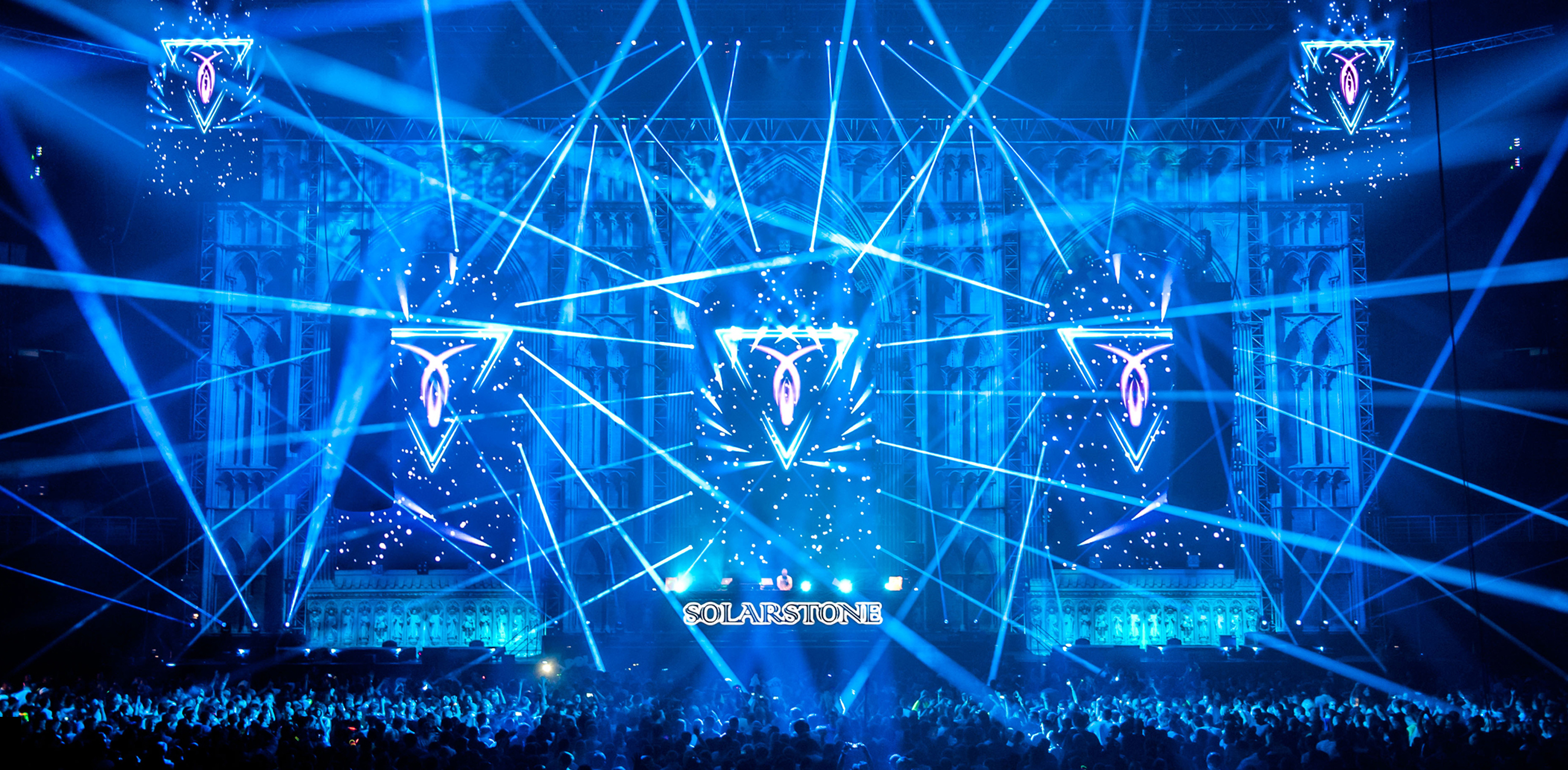
Transmission Prague 2014

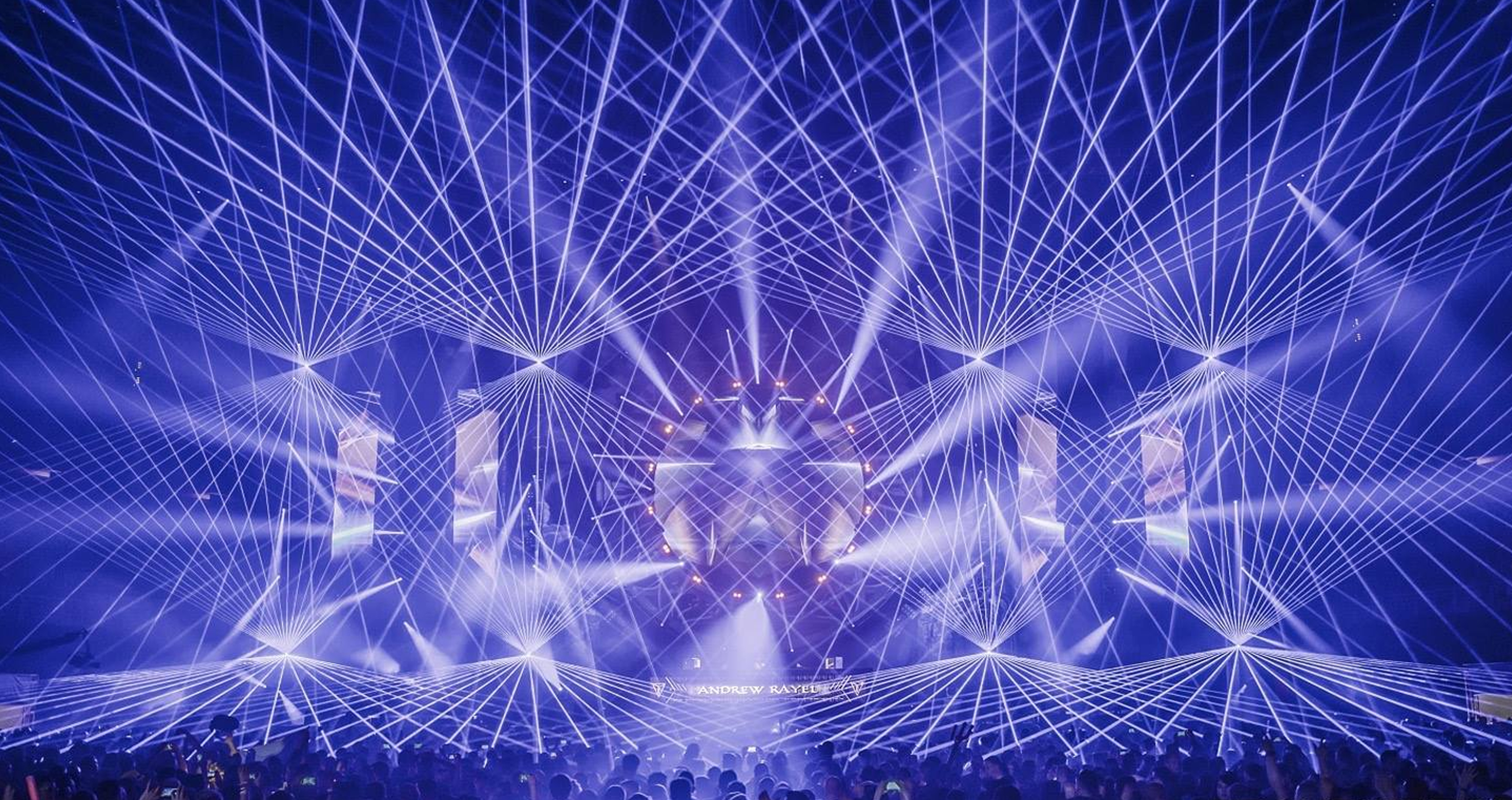
Transmission Prague 2015

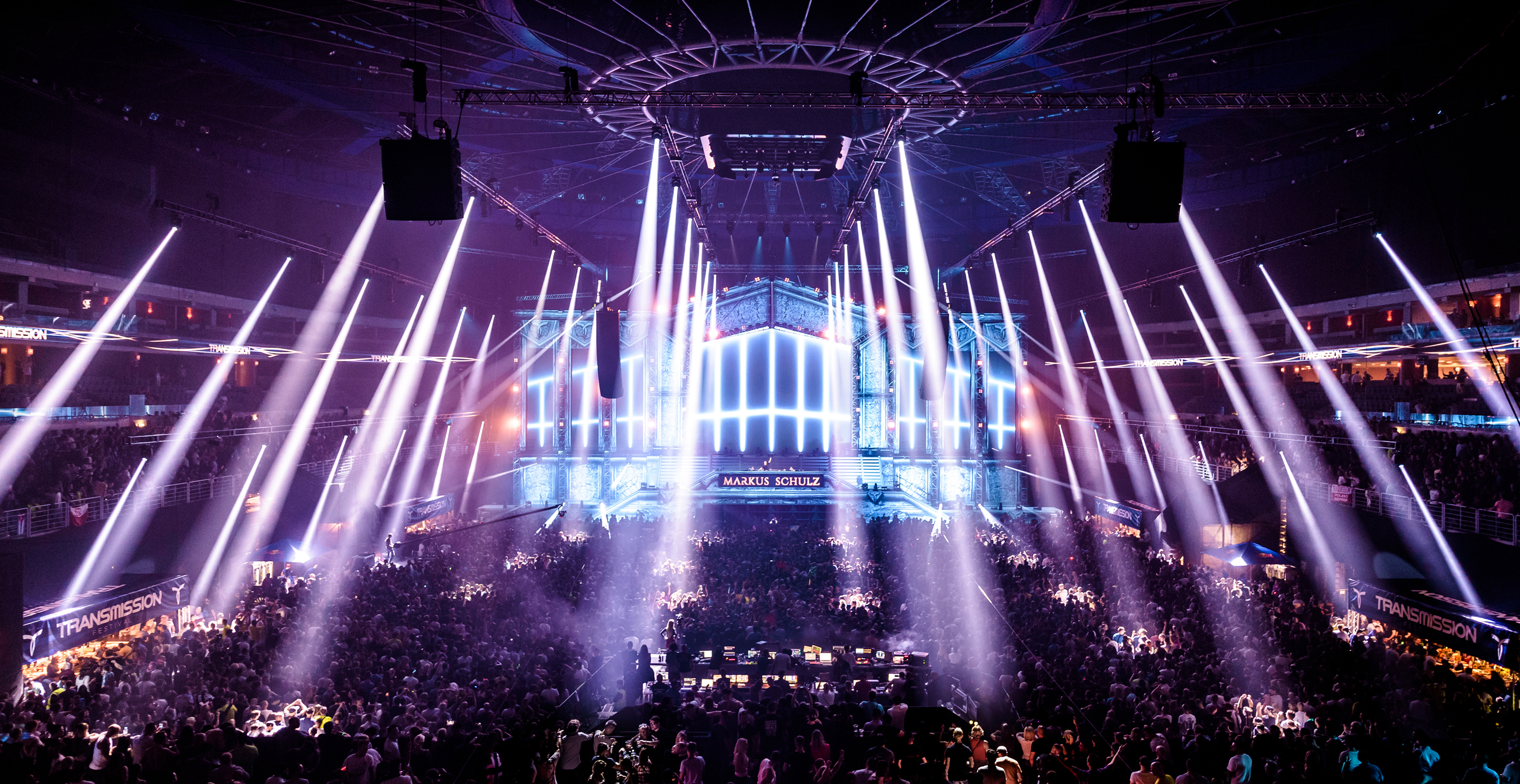
Transmission Prague 2016

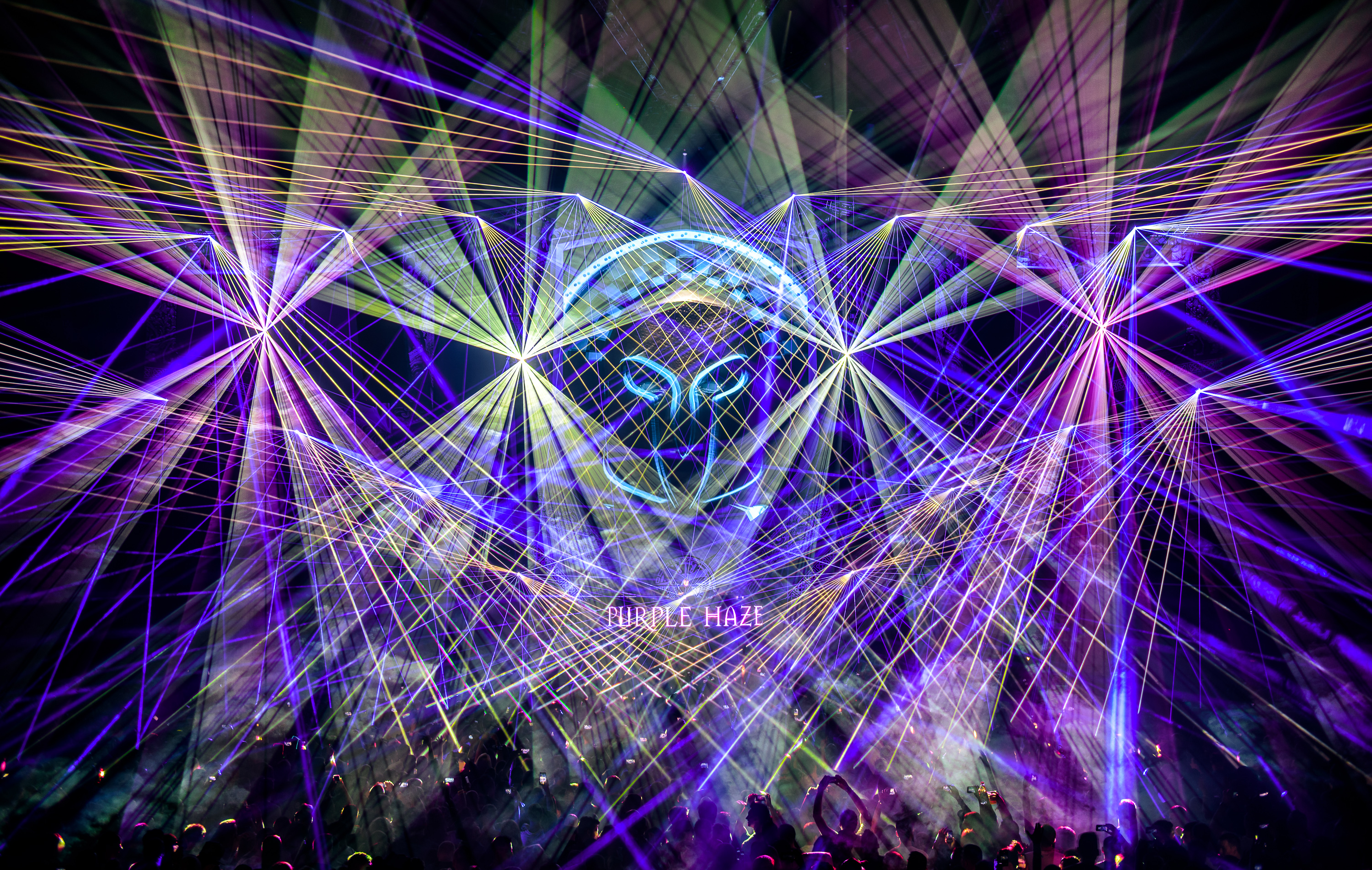
Transmission Prague 2017

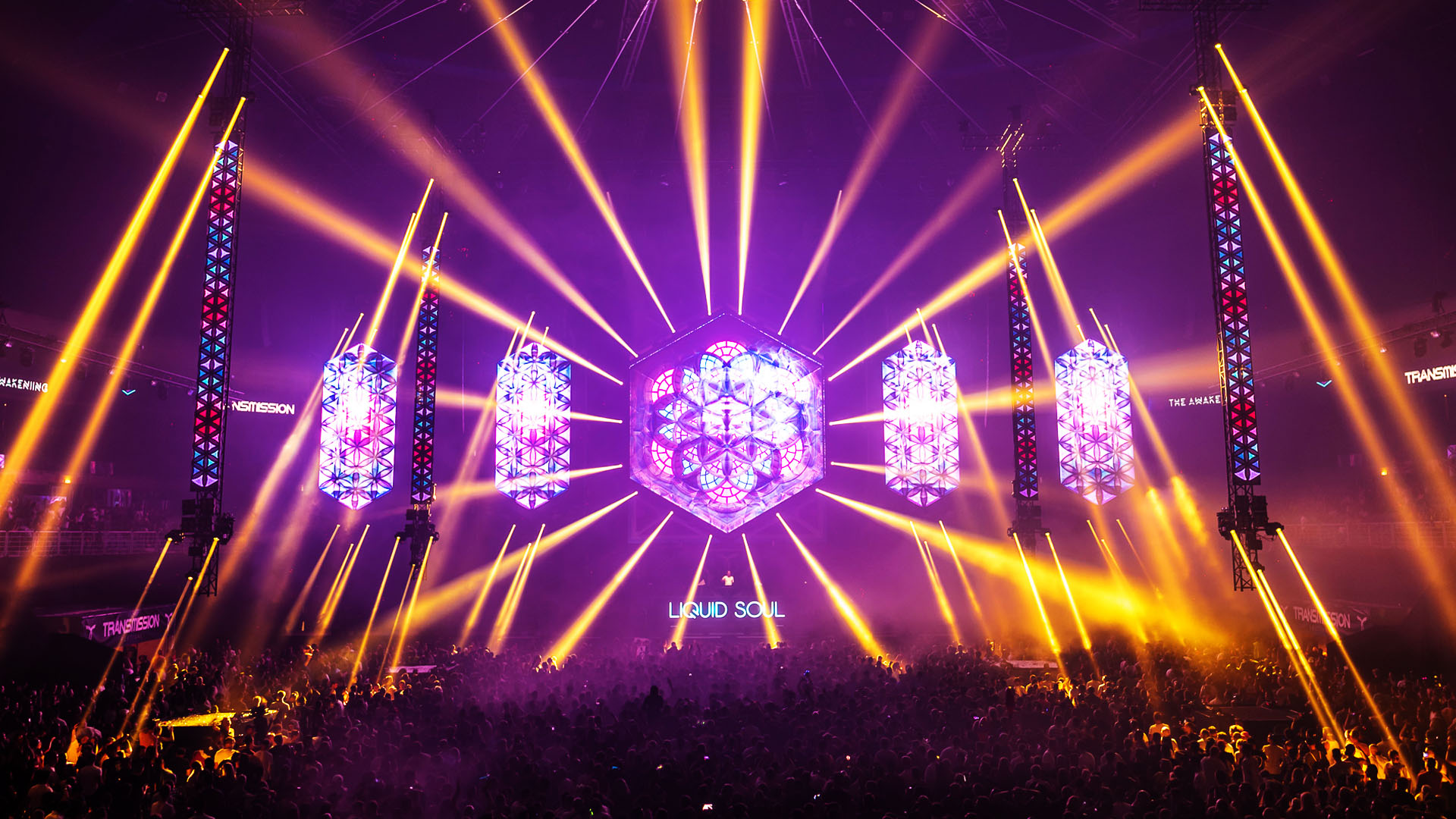
Transmission Prague 2018

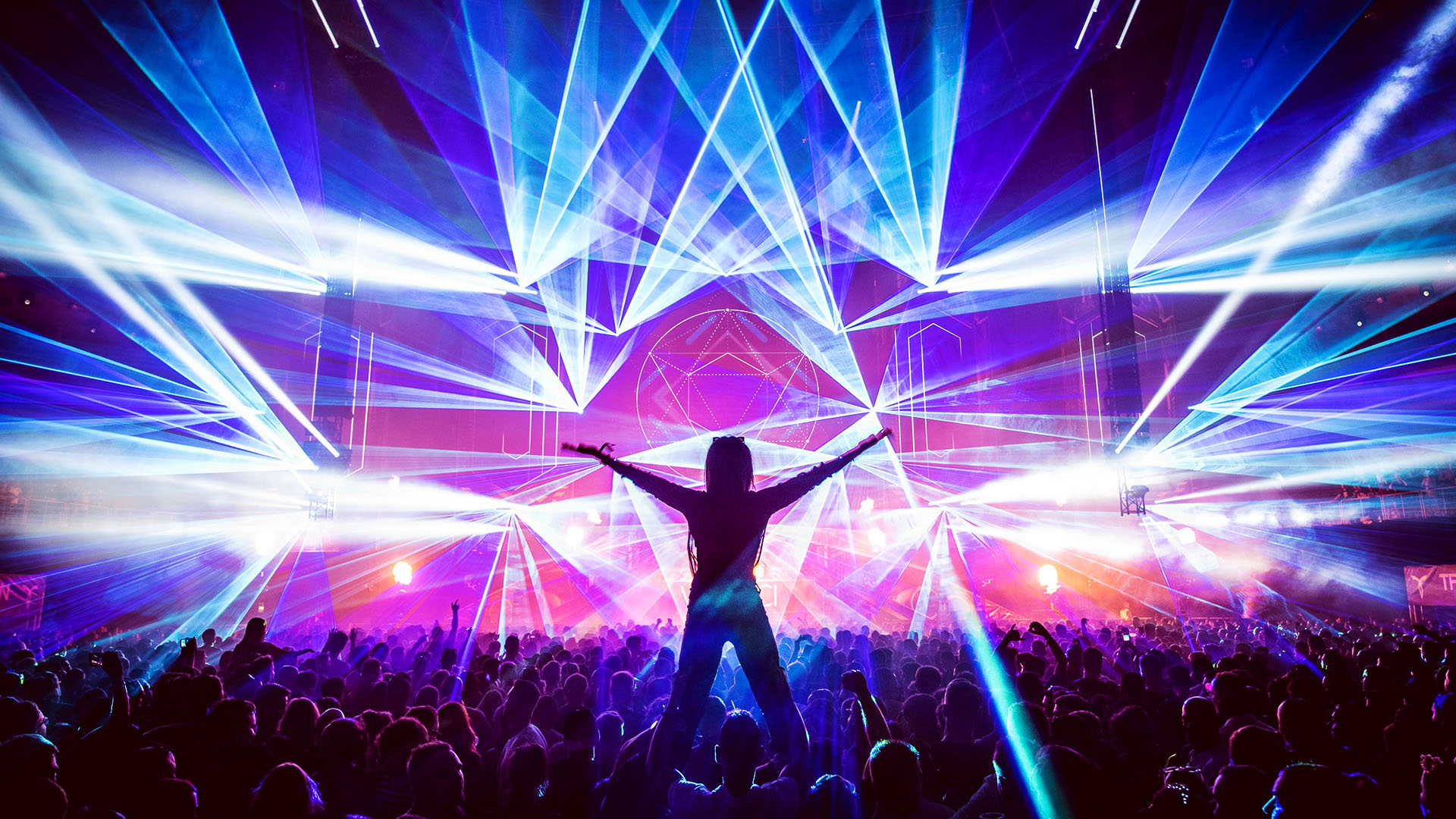
Girl in front of the lasers at Transmission Festival

== Editions ==
Number	Year	Date	Location	Title	Transmission Theme track	Line-up
1	2006	18 February	T-Mobile Arena, Prague, Czech Republic	Beyond Your Fantasy	DJ Pacific and Peran van Dijk - Transmission Theme	Ferry Corsten, M.I.K.E., Quintin, Martin Gredner, Michael C, VJs - Vision Impossible & Metal Rob
2	2006	20 May	T-Mobile Arena, Prague, Czech Republic	A Different World	N/A	Armin van Buuren, Marco V, Markus Schulz, Matthew Dekay, San, VJs - Vision Impossible & Metal Rob
3	2006	25 November	T-Mobile Arena, Prague, Czech Republic	Universal Energy	N/A	ATB, Blank & Jones, Markus Schulz, M.I.K.E., Ruby, VJs - Vision Impossible
4	2007	2 November	Sazka Arena, Prague, Czech Republic	5th Element	N/A	Above & Beyond, Christopher Lawrence, Ferry Corsten, San & Jan Johnston, Scot Project, VJs - Vision Impossible
5	2008	8 November	O2 Arena, Prague, Czech Republic	The New World	Markus Schulz - The New World	Aly & Fila, Ferry Corsten, Giuseppe Ottaviani, Markus Schulz, Michal Poliak, Rank 1, VJs - Vision Impossible
6	2009	14 November	O2 Arena, Prague, Czech Republic	Ancient Mysteries	Menno de Jong - Ancient Mysteries	Gareth Emery, Giuseppe Ottaviani (Live), Markus Schulz, Menno de Jong, San, Sander van Doorn, VJs - Vision Impossible
7	2010	6 November	O2 Arena, Prague, Czech Republic	Future Cities	Markus Schulz - Future Cities	Andy Moor, Boom Jinx, Jaytech, Markus Schulz, Sander van Doorn, Simon Paterson, W&W, VJs - Vision Impossible
8	2011	19 November	O2 Arena, Prague, Czech Republic	Digital Madness	Markus Schulz - Digital Madness	Above & Beyond, Ferry Corsten, Gareth Emery, John O'Callaghan, Markus Schulz, Michal Poliak, VJs - Vision Impossible
9	2013	19 January	O2 Arena, Prague, Czech Republic	The Spiritual Gateway	Markus Schulz - The Spiritual Gateway	Chicane (Live), Grube & Hovsepian, KhoMha, Markus Schulz, Michal Poliak, Ummet Ozcan, W&W, VJs - Vision Impossible
10	2013	30 November	O2 Arena, Prague, Czech Republic	The Machine Of Transformation	Markus Schulz - The Machine Of Transformation	Arnej, Cosmic Gate, Markus Schulz, Ørjan Nilsen, Sneijder, Tomas Heredia, The Thrillseekers (Transmix), Thomas Coastline (warm-up), VJs - Vision Impossible
11	2014	15 March	Ondrej Nepela Arena, Bratislava, Slovakia	The Spiritual Gateway	Markus Schulz - The Spiritual Gateway	Aly & Fila, Markus Schulz, Nifra, Ørjan Nilsen, Pico, Rank 1, Ummet Ozcan, VJs - Vision Impossible
12	2014	25 October	O2 Arena, Prague, Czech Republic	Seven Sins	Markus Schulz - Seven Sins	Alex M.O.R.P.H., Bryan Kearney, Giuseppe Ottaviani, John O'Callaghan, Markus Schulz, Photographer, Solarstone, Rank 1 (Transmix), Thomas Coastline (warm-up), VJs - Vision Impossible
13	2015	21 November	O2 Arena, Prague, Czech Republic	The Creation	Markus Schulz & Nifra - The Creation	Aly & Fila, Andrew Rayel, Bryan Kearney, Jorn van Deynhoven, Markus Schulz, MaRLo (Tech-Energy set), Airwave (Transmix), Driftmoon with Kim Kiona & Eller van Buuren & Koen Herfst, Thomas Coastline (warm-up)
14	2016	2 July	Hisense Arena, Melbourne, Australia	The Spiritual Gateway	Markus Schulz - The Spiritual Gateway	Allen & Envy, Ben Nicky, Markus Schulz, Sam Jones, Vini Vici, Will Atkinson, VJs - Vision Impossible
15	2016	29 October	O2 Arena, Prague, Czech Republic	The Lost Oracle	Markus Schulz - The Lost Oracle	Driftmoon b2b ReOrder, Ferry Corsten, pres. Gouryella, John O'Callaghan, Orkidea, Markus Schulz, MaRLo, Vini Vici, Thomas Coastline (warm-up), VJs - Vision Impossible
16	2017	10 March	BITEC, Bangkok, Thailand	The Lost Oracle	Markus Schulz - The Lost Oracle	Aly & Fila, Bryan Kearney, Driftmoon, Ferry Corsten, pres. Gouryella, John O'Callaghan, Markus Schulz, Omnia, LonSkii (warm-up), VJs - Vision Impossible
17	2017	30 September	Etihad Stadium, Melbourne, Australia	The Lost Oracle	Markus Schulz - The Lost Oracle	Aly & Fila, Driftmoon, Ferry Corsten, pres. Gouryella 2.0, Frontliner, Mandragora, Markus Schulz pres. Dakota, Sneijder, Marcus Santoro (warm-up), VJs - Vision Impossible
18	2017	25 November	O2 Arena, Prague, Czech Republic	The Spirit Of The Warrior	Markus Schulz pres. Dakota - The Spirit Of The Warrior	Aly & Fila, Coming Soon!!!, Driftmoon, Ferry Corsten, pres. Gouryella 2.0, Markus Schulz pres. Dakota, Sander van Doorn pres. Purple Haze, Simon Patterson, Super8 & Tab, Thomas Coastline (warm-up), VJs - Vision Impossible
19	2018	17 March	BITEC, Bangkok, Thailand	The Spirit Of The Warrior	Markus Schulz pres. Dakota - The Spirit Of The Warrior	Aly & Fila, Ben Nicky, Ferry Corsten, pres. Gouryella 2.0, Jordan Suckley, John O'Callaghan & Bryan Kearney pres. KEY4050, Markus Schulz pres. Dakota, The Thrillseekers pres. Hydra, Driftmoon & Geronimo Snijtsheuvel (Opening Ceremony), LonSkii (warm-up), VJs - Vision Impossible
20	2018	14–15 July	Airbeat One Festival, Flugplatz, Neustadt-Glewe, Germany	The Spirit Of The Warrior	Markus Schulz pres. Dakota - The Spirit Of The Warrior	Above & Beyond, Cold Blue, Darren Porter, Driftmoon, Ferry Corsten pres. Gouryella 2.0, Grum, Ilan Bluestone, Markus Schulz, MaRLo, Orkidea, Solarstone & Giuseppe Ottaviani pres. Pure NRG (Live), Sneijder, Stoneface & Terminal, Super8 & Tab, VJs - Vision Impossible
21	2018	8 August	National Exhibition and Convention Center, Shanhai, China	The Spirit Of The Warrior	Markus Schulz pres. Dakota - The Spirit Of The Warrior	Aly & Fila, Andy Moor, BT, Driftmoon, Luminn B2B Poe, Ørjan Nilsen, Sander van Doorn pres. Purple Haze, Simon Patterson, VJs - Vision Impossible
22	2018	27 October	O2 Arena, Prague, Czech Republic	The Awakening	Markus Schulz - The Awakening	Above & Beyond, Grum, Ilan Bluestone, Liquid Soul, Markus Schulz, Paul van Dyk, Vini Vici, Thomas Coastline (warm-up), VJs - Vision Impossible
23	2019	16 March	Sydney Showground, Sydney, Australia	The Awakening	Markus Schulz - The Awakening	Above & Beyond, AVAO, Ilan Bluestone, Marcus Santoro, MaRLo, Sander van Doorn pres. Purple Haze, Simon Patterson, Vini Vici, VJs - Vision Impossible
24	2019	12 October	O2 Arena, Prague, Czech Republic	Another Dimension	Giuseppe Ottaviani & Driftmoon - Another Dimension	Blastoyz, Cosmic Gate, Darren Porter, Giuseppe Ottaviani LIVE 2.0, John O'Callaghan & Bryan Kearney pres. KEY4050, MaRLo, Ferry Corsten pres. System F, Thomas Coastline (warm-up), VJs - Vision Impossible
25	2020	8 February	Sydney Showground, Sydney, Australia	Another Dimension	Giuseppe Ottaviani & Driftmoon - Another Dimension	Ben Nicky, Darren Porter, Gareth Emery, MaRLo, NWYR (W&W), Orkidea, Paul van Dyk, VJs - Vision Impossible
26	2021	11 September (postponed from 24 October 2020)	O2 Arena, Prague, Czech Republic	Behind The Mask	N/A	Aly & Fila, Jorn van Deynhoven, Gareth Emery, Markus Schulz (Rabbit Hole set), Paul van Dyk, Rodg, Whiteno1se, ProggyBoy (warm-up), VJs - Vision Impossible
27	2022	17 September	Flemington Racecourse, Melbourne, Australia	Behind The Mask	N/A	Ferry Corsten, Giuseppe Ottaviani LIVE 3.0, Markus Schulz (Rabbit Hole set), MaRLo, Rank 1 (Classics), Taglo, Vini Vici, Achilles (warm-up), VJs - Vision Impossible
28	2022	29 October	Ergo Arena, Gdańsk, Poland	Behind The Mask	Daxson - Behind The Mask	Darren Porter, Daxson, Indecent Noise b2b onTune, John O'Callaghan & Bryan Kearney pres. KEY4050, MaRLo, Roger Shah, Vini Vici, ProggyBoy (warm-up), VJs - Vision Impossible
29	2023	11 February	Sydney Showground, Sydney, Australia	The Spirit Of The Warrior	N/A	Armin van Buuren, Vini Vici, Will Atkinson, Gareth Emery, Jeffrey Sutorius, AVAO, XiJaro & Pitch, Taglo, VJs - Vision Impossible
30	2023	23 October	BITEC, Bangkok, Thailand	The Awakening	N/A	Blastoyz, Cosmic Gate, Daxson, MaRLo (Tech Energy), Stoneface & Terminal (Hybrid Live), Ferry Corsten pres. System F, Will Atkinson, Xijaro & Pitch, Jonnie B (warm-up), VJs - Vision Impossible
31	2023	28 October	Ergo Arena, Gdańsk, Poland	The Awakening	N/A	Bryan Kearney, Cold Blue, Markus Schulz, MaRLo (Tech Energy), Nifra, Paul van Dyk, Sneijder, Indecent Noise pres. DISCO19 (warm-up), VJs - Vision Impossible
32	2023	2 December	GelreDome, Arnhem, Netherlands	Elysium	Daxson - Elysium	Above & Beyond, Daxson, Giuseppe Ottaviani, Markus Schulz, MaRLo (Tech Energy), Super8 & Tab, Vini Vici, XiJaro & Pitch, Driftmoon (warm-up)
33	2024	10 March	Flemington Racecourse, Melbourne, Australia	Elysium	Daxson - Elysium	Andrew Rayel (Producer Set), Blastoyz, Cosmic Gate, Daxson, John O'Callaghan & Bryan Kearney pres. KEY4050, Markus Schulz (Rabbit Hole set), Paul van Dyk, Snijder pres. ALT1, Taglo (warm-up)
34	2024	15 June	O2 Arena, Prague, Czech Republic	Elysium	Daxson - Elysium	Cosmic Gate, Craig Connelly, Daxson, RAM & Richard Durand pres. Digital Culture, Driftmoon pres. Vintage Pure Transmix, Markus Schulz, Orjan Nilsen & Mark Sixma pres. Nilsix, Paul van Dyk, Dusk (warm-up)
35	2024	12 October	BITEC, Bangkok, Thailand	Elysium	Daxson - Elysium	RAM & Richard Durand pres. Digital Culture, Driftmoon pres. Vintage Pure Transmix, John O'Callaghan & Bryan Kearney pres. KEY4050, Markus Schulz (Rabbit Hole set), Ben Nicky pres. Emotional Havoc, John Askew & Activa pres. AA Meeting, Maddix, Ruben de Ronde, Yoshi & Razner pres. Genesis
36	2025	12 April	GelreDome, Arnhem, Netherlands	The Temple of Time	Daxson - The Temple of Time	Craig Connelly, Daxson, RAM & Richard Durand pres. Digital Culture, Driftmoon pres. Vintage Pure Transmix, Ferry Corsten pres. Gouryella, Markus Schulz, Paul van Dyk, VJs - Vision Impossible, more TBA
37	2025	9 August	Dance Valley Festival, Spaarnwoude, Netherlands	TBA	TBA	Charly Lownoise & Mental Theo, Daxson, Driftmoon, Ferry Corsten, Giuseppe Ottaviani, Markus Schulz, XiJaro & Pitch

== See also ==
- List of electronic music festivals
- Live electronic music
