= Laserface =

2017–2020 concert tour by Gareth Emery

Laserface logo

Laserface was a concert series by British DJ and producer Gareth Emery, billed as "the world’s greatest laser show," and known for its groundbreaking performances of lasers synchronized with electronic dance music (EDM). The show debuted in 2017 and ran until 2020, with performances in North America and Europe. Laserface was praised for its innovative visuals, establishing itself as one of the most ambitious laser shows in the EDM scene.

== Concept and production ==
Laserface was developed as a collaboration between Gareth Emery and laser designer Anthony Garcia. The show synchronized hundreds of high-powered lasers with Emery’s live DJ sets. Garcia, a specialist in laser programming, designed and choreographed the laser sequences to match the structure and dynamics of the music.

Unlike EDM productions that use LED screens, pyrotechnics, and automated stage lighting, Laserface relied primarily on laser technology for its visual component. Each Laserface show was configured based on the venue’s dimensions and sightlines. Garcia and his team determined laser placements to ensure even coverage and clear visibility. The show used predefined laser movements and color changes to complement shifts in Emery’s set.

The technical execution involved detailed pre-programming, with each track in Emery’s set linked to specific laser cues. Operators could make live adjustments in response to audience reactions and real-time performance dynamics, allowing for flexibility while maintaining synchronization.

== Tour and performances ==
Laserface debuted in 2017 with a sold-out show in New York City. The success of the event led to multiple performances in major cities, including Miami, Vancouver, New York, and overseas in Ibiza, Spain. Several of the performances were recorded and later released on YouTube.

Date	Location	Venue
November 18, 2017	New York, NY	Terminal 5
March 17, 2018	San Francisco, CA	Bill Graham Civic Auditorium
September 22, 2018	Vancouver, Canada	PNE Forum
October 5, 2018	Las Vegas, NV	Pearl Concert Theater
November 24, 2018	San Bernardino, CA	NOS Events Center
March 29, 2019	Miami, FL	Mana Wynwood
April 6, 2019	Seattle, WA	WaMu Theater
May 31, 2019	New York, NY	Brooklyn Mirage
September 8, 2019	Ibiza, Spain	Amnesia
October 26, 2019	Minneapolis, MN	The Armory
March 21, 2020	Miami, FL	Bayfront Park (Ultra Music Festival 2020) (Canceled)
December 17, 2020	Anaheim, CA	City National Grove (Drive-In OC)
December 18, 2020	Anaheim, CA	City National Grove (Drive-In OC)
December 19, 2020	Anaheim, CA	City National Grove (Drive-In OC)
December 20, 2020	Anaheim, CA	City National Grove (Drive-In OC)

== Reception ==
Laserface was met with widespread acclaim from both fans and industry professionals. Critics praised the show for its technical sophistication and its ability to elevate the concert experience beyond a standard DJ set. The combination of Emery’s melodic trance music with Garcia’s laser artistry was often described as “awe-inspiring” and “revolutionary” within the electronic music scene. Fans particularly appreciated the level of synchronization between the music and the visuals, which many considered unparalleled in EDM event production.

== Legacy and influence ==
Laserface influenced the evolution of live EDM visuals by redefining large-scale laser production. The show’s use of over 100 lasers at venues like the Bill Graham Civic Auditorium in San Francisco set a new benchmark for synchronizing lasers with electronic music performances. This level of precision and scale shaped subsequent EDM stage designs, demonstrating the potential of laser-centric visual experiences.

Building on the technical innovations from Laserface, Gareth Emery continues to develop new show concepts. His LSR/CITY project integrates laser technology with immersive performance elements, advancing audiovisual concert experiences.
