= Something to Live For (John O'Callaghan album) =

Studio album by John O'Callaghan
- Released: May 28, 2007
- Genre: Trance
- Label: Discover
- Producer: John O'Callaghan

John O'Callaghan chronology
Something to Live For (2007)	Never Fade Away (2009)

Something to Live For is the first studio album by Irish trance producer and DJ John O'Callaghan, released May 28, 2007, on Discover.

== Track listing ==
Concept
No.	Title	Writer(s)	Producer(s)	Length
1.	"Split Decision"			5:27
2.	"Save It for a Rainy Day"			3:30
3.	"Pendulum" (featuring Bryan Kearney)	Bryan Kearney	Bryan Kearney	4:07
4.	"Elevator Dance-Off"			3:08
5.	"Space & Time"			5:20
6.	"The Chamber" (featuring Neal Scarborough)	Neal Scarborough	Neal Scarborough	6:42
7.	"Shortwave"			5:05
8.	"Stormy Clouds"			4:49
9.	"A Life Elsewhere" (featuring Thomas Bronzwaer)	Thomas Bronzwaer	Thomas Bronzwaer	4:36
10.	"The System (Interlude)" (featuring Neal Scarborough)	Neal Scarborough	Neal Scarborough	4:47
11.	"Sunday 1am"			3:52
12.	"Inverse Function"			3:51
13.	"Vendetta"			4:04
14.	"Cruise Control"			3:09
15.	"Exactly" (featuring Bryan Kearney)	Bryan Kearney	Bryan Kearney	4:03
16.	"World Gone Mad" (featuring Kevin McKinney)	Kevin McKinney	Kevin McKinney	3:49
17.	"Assembler"			6:35

Club
No.	Title	Writer(s)	Producer(s)	Length
1.	"Low Resolution Fox (John Askew Remix)"			9:02
2.	"Space & Time (Club Mix)"			9:04
3.	"Exactly (DJ Governor Remix)" (as O'Callaghan & Kearney)	Bryan Kearney	Bryan Kearney	8:33
4.	"Split Decision (Paranoid Mix)"			7:10
5.	"Sunday 1am"			8:36
6.	"For the Record" (as Cartel)	John Askew	John Askew	7:04
7.	"The Temple" (as O'Callaghan & Kearney)	Bryan Kearney	Bryan Kearney	6:35
8.	"Assembler"			8:06
9.	"One Way Ticket" (as O'Callaghan & Downey)	Greg Downey	Greg Downey	8:29

=== Personnel ===
- Written and produced by John O'Callaghan
