= PureNRG (trance group) =

Music Group

- Origin: United Kingdom, Italy
- Genre: Trance
- Occupations: DJ, Producer, Remixer
- Years active: 2015–present
- Label: Black Hole Recordings
- Members: Solarstone; Giuseppe Ottaviani
- Website: purenrglive.com

PureNRG are a live electronic music act, composed of members Solarstone and Giuseppe Ottaviani.

== Biography ==
The name of the act was derived from Solarstone's 'Pure Trance' label, and Giuseppe's previous act 'Nu NRG'.

The duo began producing and performing together in 2015, and have since performed in clubs and at festivals regularly. When performing live, they use a custom designed set-up including many of the instruments and much of the equipment used to produce their music in the studio.

In 2016 they released the track 'Secret of the Sahara', which utilises a sample of a track by the same name, originally composed by Ennio Morricone. This was notable as Ennio has not allowed any of his music to be utilised in electronic music in over 20 years.

== Discography ==
Singles

Year	Name	Release date	Notes
2015	Pump up the NRG	04-06-2015	
2015	Era	16-10-2015	
2016	Secret of the Sahara	29-02-2016	Utilises a sample of 'Secret of the Sahara' by Ennio Morricone
2016	Scarlett	18-07-2016	
2017	Marmion – Schoneberg (PureNRG Remix)	09-01-2017	
2017	Prophecy	06-02-2017	Anthem for Istoria 2017 Trance Event
2017	Cala Blanca	22-05-2017	
2017	Midnight Blue	29-09-2017	
2017	Armin van Buuren feat. Josh Cumbee – Sunny Days (PureNRG Remix)	19-10-2017	
2017	BT Feat. JES – Every Other Way (PureNRG Remix)	15-12-2017	
2018	Chrysalis	15-10-2018	
