= Solarstone =

British DJ and trance music producer

- Also known as: Liquid State, Z2, 2nd Element
- Born: Richard John Mowatt; 20 October 1972 (age 53)
- Genres: Trance
- Occupations: DJ, producer, remixer
- Years active: 1989–present
- Labels: Touchstone Recordings, Molecule, Pure Trance Recordings, Electronic Architecture Records
- Past members: Andy Bury (1996–2006); Sam Tierney (1996–1997)
- Website: www.solarstone.co.uk

Richard Mowatt (born on 20 October 1972), commonly known by his stage name Solarstone (formerly spelled Solar Stone), is a British trance DJ and producer based in Birmingham and Wales. The music project Solarstone was founded in 1997 as a trio, and also used the pseudonyms Young Parisians, Liquid State and Z2. Over the years, Solarstone has developed a reputation for keeping to the original and classic trance sound. He is considered to be a veteran by fans in the trance music scene. Since 2012, Solarstone has been pushing forward a Pure Trance movement through tours where he aims to keep the trance genre true to its roots.

He's been on DJ Mag's top 100 list in 2008 and 2013.

== Biography ==
The music project Solar Stone was founded in Dudley in 1997 by Richard Mowatt, Andy Bury and Sam Tierney. Since 1994, the trio had been known as the Space Kittens. Sam Tierney left the group in 1997 owing to musical differences, and in 2006 Andy Bury also left, leaving Mowatt as the sole member.

Solarstone has had three major hit singles in the UK. The most successful was Seven Cities, which reached number 39 in 1999. The song was one of the earliest and most famous examples of the Balearic trance genre, and has been re-released three times. The song has sold over 500,000 copies.

In 2003 and 2004, Solarstone collaborated with Scott Bond, releasing the three singles "3rd Earth", "Naked Angel" and "Red Line Highway". The group's debut album, AnthologyOne, was released in 2006. In 2008, their second studio album, Rain Stars Eternal, was released.

Solarstone has also produced several remixes and collaborated with renowned trance artists such as Paul Oakenfold and Thea Riley.

In 2014, Solarstone and Giuseppe Ottaviani began a collaboration project known as PureNRG. PureNRG have since released a number of singles, and perform live on stage regularly.

== Radio shows ==
The Deep Blue Radioshow was produced by Rich Mowatt, the first episode of which was released on 19 May 2005. The first show featured a 30minute Woody van Eyden Guestmix and was nearly 2hrs long. The final episode of Deep Blue Radio Show was 116 DJd by Robbie Nelson and was released on 10 July 2008.

Rich Mowatt and Robbie Nelson later produced the Solaris International Radio Show, beginning in 2004, which was distributed through various online channels. In the early years, the programme appeared irregularly and was a mix of interviews and new music. From December 2006 (Episode 33) it appeared as a weekly, two-hour podcast. The show was reduced to a 1hr show in episode 294. Solaris International was hosted on alternate weeks by Nelson and Mowatt and included new tracks and remixes, a half-hour guest DJ mix, and at least one classic trance track from the late 1990s or early 2000s. The final episode was number 465 which was released on 18 August 2015.

On 2 September 2015, Solarstone launched the first episode of his new radio show Pure Trance Radio. Episode 100 was broadcast on 9 August 2017, live from the A State of Trance Studio in Amsterdam. The show is released on various platforms. All episodes of the show are presented by Solarstone.

Solarstone launched The Morning Show on 2 November 2020, streamed live on weekdays on his Twitch channel; features include the Coffee Break and the subscriber-requested Kickstarter.

== Discography ==
Studio albums

Year	Name	Release date	Notes
2006	Anthology One		
2008	Rain Stars Eternal		
2009	RSEmix		Remix album of Rain Stars Eternal
2010	Touchstone	08-2011	
2012	Touchstone Remixed	01-2012	Remix album
2012	Pure	21-05-2012	
2017	.----	14-04-2017	Part 1 of album "One"
2018	..---	04-05-2018	Part 2 of album "One"
2019	...--	01-11-2019	Part 3 of album "One"
2019	One	01-11-2019	
2020	Island	18-09-2020	
2025	Innermost	06-2025	

Compilation albums

Year	Name	Release date	Notes
2001	Chilled Out Euphoria		
2005	Destinations vol.1		
2009	Electronic Architecture		
2011	Electronic Architecture 2	04-2011	
2011	EA2 – The Ambient Edition	08-2011	
2012	Solarstone Presents Pure Trance Volume 1	19-11-2012	Mixed with Orkidea
2013	Solarstone Presents Pure Trance Volume 2	28-10-2013	Mixed with Giuseppe Ottaviani
2014	Electronic Architecture 3	27-07-2014	
2014	Solarstone Presents Pure Trance Volume 3	27-10-2014	Mixed with Bryan Kearney
2015	Solarstone Presents Pure Trance Volume 4	20-11-2015	Mixed with Gai Barone
2016	Solarstone Presents Pure Trance Volume 5	28-10-2016	Mixed with Forerunners and Sneijder
2017	Solarstone Presents Pure Trance Volume 6	27-10-2017	Mixed with Robert Nickson and Factor B
2018	Solarstone Presents Pure Trance Volume 7	09-11-2018	Mixed with Kristina Sky and Lostly
2019	Solarstone Presents Pure Trance Volume 8	29-11-2019	Mixed with Activa
2021	Electronic Architecture 4	14-05-2021	
2021	Solarstone Presents Pure Trance Volume 9	11-12-2021	Mixed with Stoneface & Terminal
2021	Solarstone Presents Pure Trance Volume 10	03-11-2024	

Singles

Year	Name	Release date	Notes
1997	The Calling		
1998	The Impressions (EP)		
1999	Seven Cities		
2001	Speak in Sympathy		featuring Elizabeth Fields
2002	Solarcoaster/Greenlight		
2003	Third Earth		with Scott Bond
2003	Release/Destination		
2004	Jump The Next Train		as Young Parisians featuring Ben Lost
2004	Naked Angel		with Scott Bond
2005	Red Line Highway		with Scott Bond
2006	Eastern Sea		
2006	Like a Waterfall		featuring JES
2007	Late Summer Fields		with Alucard
2007	The Calling 2007		
2008	4Ever		
2008	Hold My Breath		with Mr. Sam and Andy Duguid
2008	Spectrum		
2008	Rain Stars Eternal		
2009	Later Summer Fields		
2009	Part of Me		featuring Elizabeth Fields
2009	Lunar Rings		featuring Essence
2010	Slowmotion		with Orkidea
2010	Electric Love		featuring Bill McGruddy
2010	Touchstone		
2010	Is There Anyone Out There?	01-2011	featuring Bill McGruddy
2011	Big Wheel	04-2011	Samples 'Buffy Sainte-Marie – Little Wheel Spin and Spin'
2011	Zeitgeist	08-2011	with Orkidea
2011	Breakaway (Remixes)	10-2011	featuring Alex Karweit
2012	The Spell	16-04-2012	featuring Clare Stagg
2012	Pure	28-05-2012	
2012	Fireisland	16-07-2012	with Aly & Fila
2012	Falcons	10-09-2012	with Giuseppe Ottaviani
2013	Jewel	28-01-2013	featuring Clare Stagg
2013	Please	15-04-2013	
2013	Love Theme from Blade Runner	23-09-2013	
2013	Slowmotion II	30-09-2013	with Orkidea
2013	Lovers	09-12-2013	featuring Lemon
2013	Slowmotion III	23-06-2013	with Orkidea
2014	4Ever (Retouch)	15-09-2014	
2015	Nothing But Chemistry Here	02-02-2015	includes vocal sample from Breaking Bad
2015	Shield Pt.1	27-04-2015	
2015	Once	22-06-2015	featuring Iko
2015	Fata Morgana	23-11-2015	with Gai Barone
2016	Lost Hearts	25-04-2016	
2016	Falling (Peter Steele Mantra Mix)	20-06-2016	featuring Marcella Woods
2016	Herald	05-09-2016	
2016	Lifeline	14-11-2016	with Ferry Tayle
2017	A State of Mind	03-03-2017	
2017	I Found You	28-04-2017	featuring Meredith Call
2017	Leap of Faith	12-06-2017	
2017	Slowmotion IV	17-07-2017	with Orkidea
2017	Hemispheres	18-09-2017	with John 00 Fleming
2017	Choosing His Angels	24-11-2017	featuring Alex Karweit
2017	Querencia	11-12-2017	with Indecent Noise
2018	Untitled Love	07-04-2018	featuring Rabbii
2018	Thank You	27-04-2018	
2018	I Want You Here	03-08-2018	featuring Thea Riley
2018	Motif	05-10-2018	
2019	Shield Pt. I&II	01-02-2018	
2019	Landmark	21-06-2019	with Lostly
2019	Sky	04-10-2019	
2019	Spirit	06-12-2019	with Activa
2019	Indestructible	20-12-2019	with Betsie Larkin
2020	Voyager II	10-01-2020	with Robert Nickson
2020	Slowmotion V	07-02-2020	with Orkidea
2020	Monkey Mia	12-06-2020	with Future Disciple
2020	Rust	03-08-2020	with Ian Urbina
2020	Summer Fills the Sky	12-10-2020	
2020	island	16-11-2020	
2021	S3000	29-01-2021	
2021	Restless 4AM		
2021	Slowmotion VI		With Orkidea
2021	When I Dream		
2021	Rediscover		As 'Young Parisians'. With Katherine Amy
2021	Ganzfeld		As Solarstone Presents Ganzfeld
2021	Equilibrium		With Dreams of Wires
2022	Sovereign		
2022	Mist on the Hill		With Stoneface & Terminal
2022	Hope		
2023	Vision		
2023	Felt		As '892NOW' with Obie Fernandez
2024	The One		With Stine Grove
2024	A Long Way from Home		With Darren Tate, Feat Julie Scott
2024	Velvet Tread		With Farius
2024	Revelation		With Evan Henzi
2024	Evensong		With Obie Fernandez
2024	Aurora Borealis		
2024	Thinking of You		
2024	Barton Springs		With Farius
2025	Shivelight		

=== Remixes ===
- 1997: Energy 52 – Café Del Mar
- 1997: Chakra – Home
- 1998: Dominion – 11 hours
- 1999: Matt Darey – From Russia With Love
- 2000: Moonman – Galaxia
- 2000: Planet Perfecto – Bullet in the Gun 2000
- 2000: Cygnus X – Orange Theme
- 2001: Junk Project – Composure
- 2001: Jan Johnston – Silent Words
- 2002: Paul Oakenfold – Southern Sun
- 2002: Conjure One – Sleep
- 2003: Conjure One – Center of the Sun
- 2004: Filo and Peri presents Whirlpool – Under the Sun
- 2004: Sarah McLachlan – World on Fire
- 2008: Radiohead – House of Cards
- 2009: Ferry Corsten – Gabriellas Sky
- 2012: Delerium featuring Michael Logen – Days Turn Into Nights
- 2013: Armin Van Buuren featuring Emma Hewitt – Forever Is Ours
- 2013: Vangelis – Love Theme from Blade Runner
- 2015: Gai Barone – Mr. Slade
- 2016: Markus Schulz – Facedown
- 2016: Gai Barone – Lost in Music
- 2017: Raz Nitzan and Moya Brennan – Find The Sun (Solarstone Remix)
- 2017: Eco – The Lonely Soldier (Solarstone Pure Remix)
- 2017: Future Disciple – Jinka Blue (Solarstone Pure Remix)
- 2018: Pink Bomb – Indica (Solarstone Pure Mix)
- 2019: Duncan Laurence – Arcade
- 2020: Markus Schulz and Adina Butar – In Search of Sunrise (Solarstone Pure Mix)
- 2020: Hybrid – Nails
- 2022: Sunscreem – Love U More
- 2022: Sawyer, Stubbs & Ledge – Reverie
- 2023: Emma Hewitt – Children
- 2023: Super-Frog Saves Tokyo – Reactivate
