= Seven Cities (song) =

Single by Solarstone
- Released: (United Kingdom) October 26, 1999
- Recorded: September 1999
- Genre: Trance, Balearic trance
- Length: 8:55 (Atlantis Mix)
- Label: Hooj Choons
- Songwriters: Andy Bury, Rich Mowatt
- Producers: Andy Bury, Rich Mowatt

Solarstone singles chronology
"The Impressions" (1998)	"Seven Cities" (1999)	"Speak in Sympathy" (2001)

"Seven Cities" is a musical single by Solarstone released in 1999 written and produced by Rich Mowatt and Andy Bury. The single is considered to be a Balearic trance anthem. The vocals for the 2002 re-release were co-written and performed by Elizabeth Fields. The original version contains a sample of a vocal by Miriam Stockley from the track Tintinnabulum by Adiemus.

The track has been remixed by Armin van Buuren and other notable producers. The original 'Atlantis Mix' reached number #39 in the UK Singles Chart in 1999. The Armin van Buuren remix reached #44 in 2002, and was later ranked #87 in the A State of Trance Top 1000 in 2021.

== Remixes ==
- Armin van Buuren Remix
- Armin van Buuren Vocal Remix
- V-One's "Living Cities" Remix
- Atlantis Mix
- Michael Woods Remix
- Katcha Remix
- Solarstone's Ambient Dub Mix
- Tom Colontonio Remix
- Solarstone Pure Mix
- Antillas and Dankann Remix
- Thomas Datt Remix
- Almar Remix
- Darren Porter Refresh
- Solarstone's Transatlantis Mix
- Ferry Tayle Remix
- Stowers and Bostock Remix
- Infra Records Remix
- Paris & Sharpe Remix
- Tom Staar Remix
- Chris Schweizer Remix

== Single ==
UK Single

1. "Seven Cities (Solar Stone's Atlantis Edit)" – 3:31
2. "Seven Cities (V - One's 'Living Cities' Remix)" – 8:38
3. "Seven Cities (Solar Stone's Costal Mix)" – 7:27
