= LSR/CITY =

Electronic music project

LSR/CITY logo

LSR/CITY (pronounced "laser city") is an electronic dance music and live-performance project created by British DJ and producer Gareth Emery. Initially launched in 2021 as an audiovisual NFT collection, it subsequently developed into a concert production and recording project. Building on Emery's earlier Laserface tour, its live shows combine synchronized laser displays, digital visuals, and live musical performances. Vocalist Annabel features on its recordings and in its live productions. The project’s CYBERPUNK production won first place in the Live Stage Show category at the 2025 International Laser Display Association awards.

== History ==
On April 15, 2021, Gareth Emery launched LSR/CITY with an NFT collection featuring five original songs. Emery focused on the collection after the COVID-19 pandemic interrupted his touring schedule. Its production involved composing the music, filming a laser show for each piece, and incorporating the footage into a three-dimensional digital environment. Emery learned video-editing software during the COVID-19 lockdowns, enabling him to become involved in the project's visual production.

In 2022, Emery announced LSR/CITY's live production as the successor to his earlier Laserface tour.

By 2023, LSR/CITY had also become an outlet for Emery's recorded music. He described the existing concert project as a platform for releasing material without the expectations associated with his established solo catalog, allowing him to explore styles beyond the trance music he typically released under his own name.

In June 2026, Emery announced Emotional Intelligence Records, a record label associated with LSR/CITY and dedicated to human-created music and artwork. Emery criticized the use of musicians' work to train generative artificial intelligence systems without their consent and emphasized the importance of preserving human creativity in music. LSR/CITY's "Burn It Down" was announced as its debut release.

== Music and live production ==
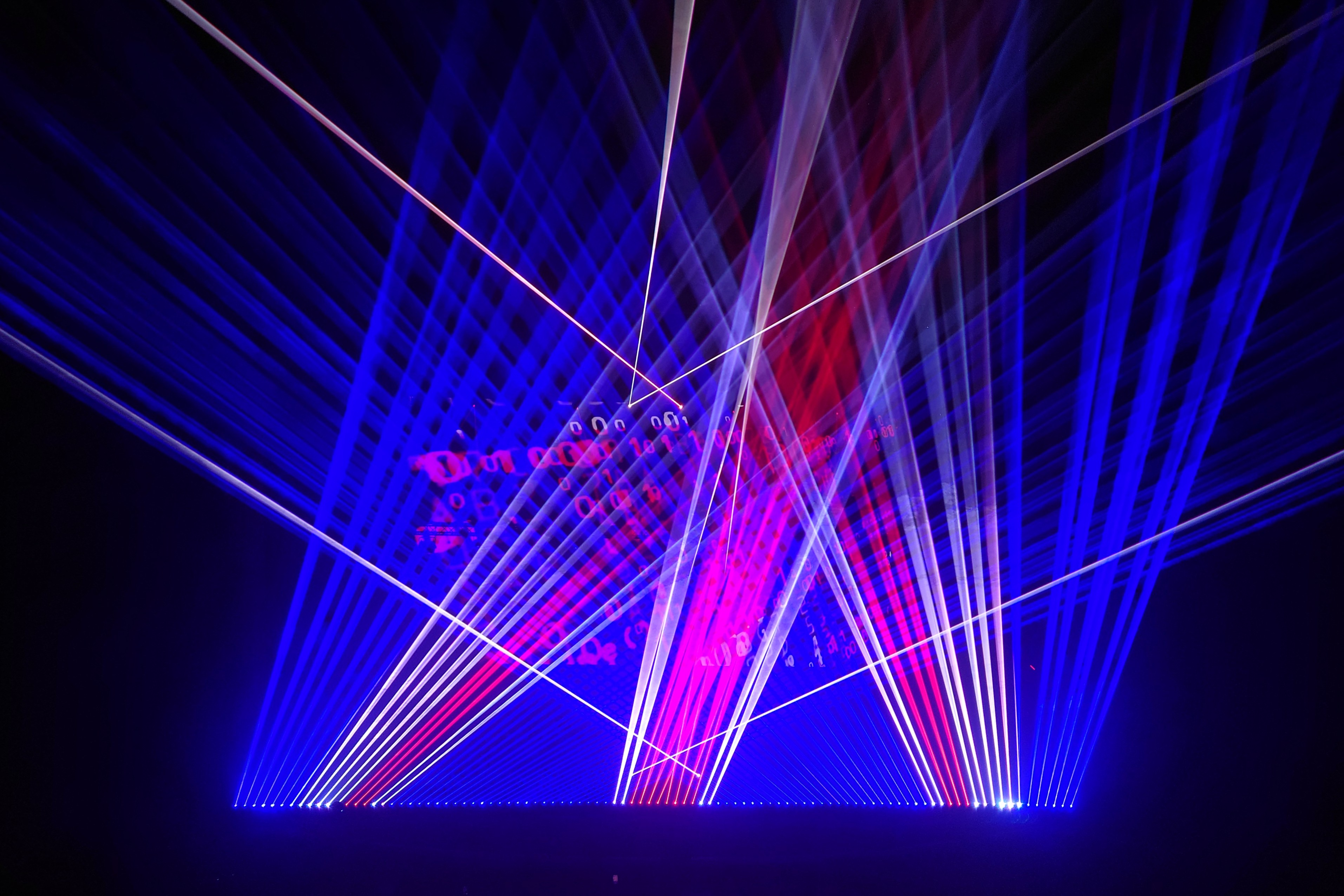
Lasers forming the Union Jack during the 2025 LSR/CITY: CYBERPUNK show in London

The live shows feature LSR/CITY releases, Emery's solo recordings, remixes, and tracks by other artists. The sets have included trance, techno, acid, hard dance, drum and bass, and rock, as well as reworked versions of existing songs.

Vocalist Annabel Turner records and performs with LSR/CITY under the name Annabel. She previously provided vocals throughout Emery's 2020 album The Lasers. The live shows also feature instrumental performances by Emery on guitar and keyboards.

In a 2023 interview, Emery described an emphasis on lasers rather than video screens and other visual effects. Laser choreography is central to LSR/CITY's live productions, with laser effects designed around specific musical passages. The laser displays include geometric patterns and sequenced color effects, with projections extending overhead and into the audience area. The CYBERPUNK production used 110 lasers in a custom system incorporating Hydra Bars, laser fixtures developed by Rick Hale of Slick Lasers. LSR/CITY stated that the Hydra Bars were built specifically for the CYBERPUNK tour.

The productions include scripted narratives, with video sequences introducing characters and advancing the story between musical passages. In V3, recurring filmed scenes showed Annabel recounting a night out with a friend to see LSR/CITY. CYBERPUNK used a dystopian setting in which artificial intelligence and technological dependence had suppressed human creativity and social connection. LSR/CITY X is set in the year 2056 and centers on resistance to AI-controlled entertainment streams and the preservation of human-created music.

== Live performances ==
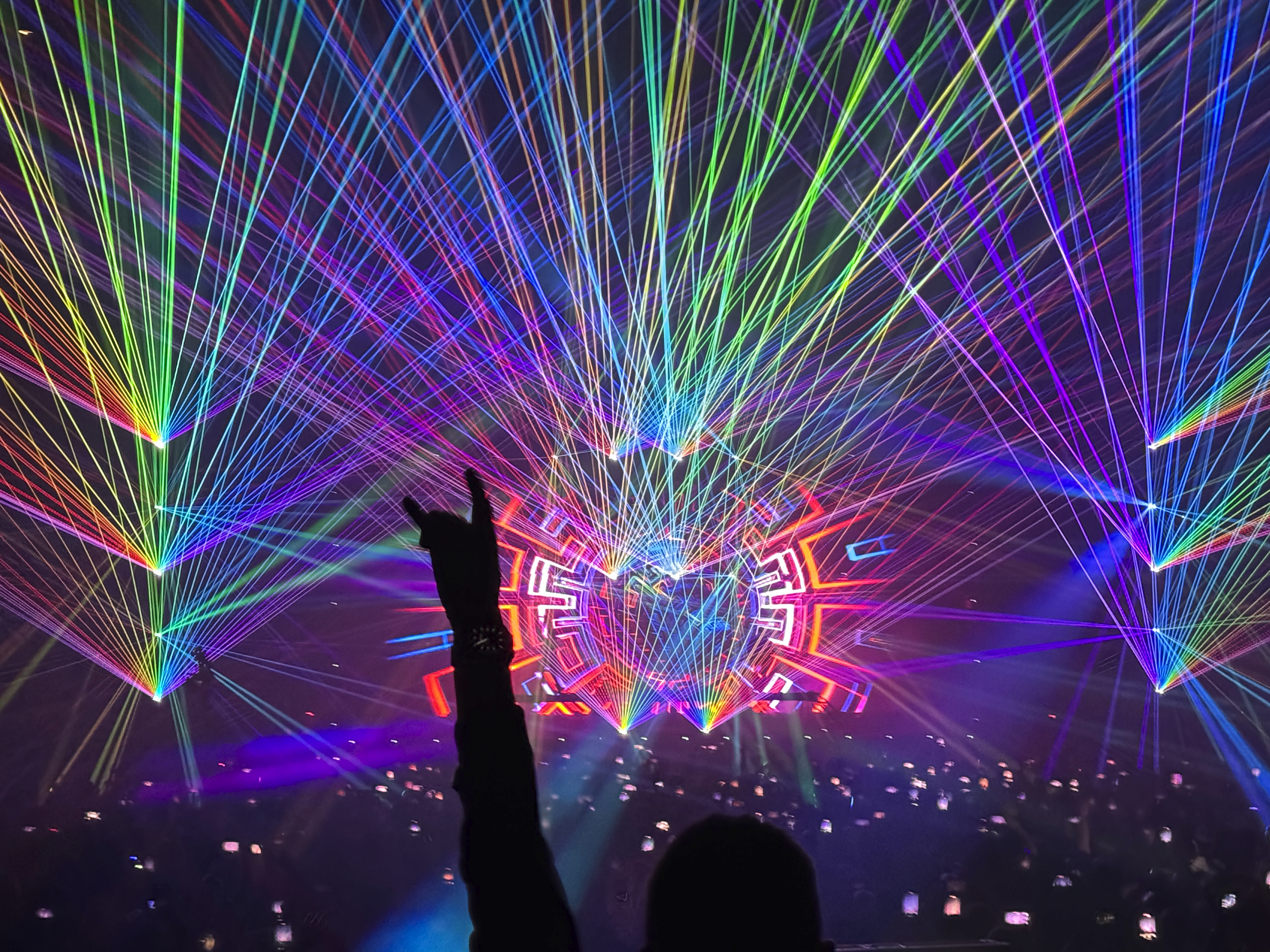
Gareth Emery’s LSR/CITY: CYBERPUNK performance on March 22, 2025, at the Kia Forum in Los Angeles.

The first LSR/CITY concert was held on May 19, 2022, at a warehouse venue in Las Vegas during EDC Week.

In mid-2022, Emery announced the LSR/CITY V2 tour. The five-city North American tour ran from the Shrine Auditorium in Los Angeles on September 24, 2022, to The Armory in Minneapolis on December 3.

In 2024, the LSR/CITY V3 tour opened with a sold-out show at Vancouver's Pacific Coliseum on February 10. The tour comprised 16 shows across 13 North American cities.

In October 2024, Emery announced the LSR/CITY: CYBERPUNK tour, the fourth installment of the live production, with North American dates in early 2025 and a European debut in London at O2 Academy Brixton that September. The tour comprised 18 shows across 17 cities.

In May 2026, Emery announced LSR/CITY X, a series of DJ sets accompanied by laser displays. He explained that the format allowed him to vary the track selection between performances and test new material for a LSR/CITY album he was developing. The tour comprised 10 shows in 10 North American cities. Performances included Calgary's Badlands Music Festival on July 10, Denver's Mission Ballroom on September 5, and Montreal's New City Gas on October 24.

Emery has released full-length concert videos on YouTube, including V2 and V3 shows, the March 22, 2025, CYBERPUNK show at the Kia Forum in Los Angeles, and LSR/CITY X at Calgary's Badlands Music Festival.

In October 2026, Emery announced LSR/CITY: Escape the Vortex, scheduled for February 27, 2027, at Vancouver's Pacific Coliseum.

== Discography ==
LSR/CITY began releasing singles in 2023. On December 12, 2025, the project released "Invisible" and "Microdose" together as "B-SIDES #1". "B-SIDES #2", containing "Bones" and "Dry Lines", followed on January 30, 2026. According to Emery, "Bones" had premiered during V2, while "Dry Lines" had featured in V3.

=== Albums ===
The 19-track album CYBERPUNK (Original Motion Concert Soundtrack) was released on July 25, 2025. It includes "cyberpunk reboot" versions of "Without U" and "You'll Be OK", and collaborations with Coheed and Cambria and Omnia.

=== Selected songs ===
- "Microdose" (2023; reissued 2025)
- "Like a Prayer" (Madonna cover) (2023)
- "Black & White" (2023)
- "House in the Streetlight" (2023)
- "Ice Moon" (2024)
- "Killshot" (2024)
- "Never Going Back" (2024)
- "Fable" (with Robert Miles) (2024)
- "FCK That" (2024)
- "Don't Leave" (2024)
- "Without U" (2024)
- "Shadow City" (2025)
- "Counting on You" (with Coheed and Cambria) (2025)
- "Out of the Sky" (originally by Lange featuring Sarah Howells) (2025)
- "You'll Be OK (cyberpunk reboot)" (2025)
- "Take Me Home, Country Roads" (John Denver cover) (2025)
- "Come Home" (2025)
- "Before You Go" (2025)
- "Zorro" (2025)
- "Invisible" (2025)
- "Bones" (2026)
- "Dry Lines" (2026)
- "There Is a Light That Never Goes Out" (The Smiths cover) (2026)
- "Burn It Down" (2026)
- "This Is Where It Starts" (2026)
- "421 (Killed Me Yesterday)" (2026)

== Reception and recognition ==
Reviewing V3 in Vancouver, Shakiel Mahjouri of EDM.com characterized the production as electronic dance music theater. Hannah Roberts of EDM Identity praised the flow of the track selection at the Los Angeles performance. Reviewing CYBERPUNK in Vancouver, Ryan Hayes of EDM Canada highlighted Annabel's vocals and the quieter emotional moments they provided between higher-energy tracks.

LSR/CITY: CYBERPUNK won first place in the Live Stage Show category at the 2025 awards of the International Laser Display Association.
