= Giuseppe Ottaviani =

Italian musician and disc jockey (b. 1978)

- Born: 12 November 1978 (age 47)
- Origin: Viterbo, Lazio, Italy
- Genres: Trance, progressive trance, tech trance
- Instruments: Synthesizer, sequencer, drum machine, keyboard
- Years active: 1999-present
- Labels: GO Music, FSOE, Vandit, Subculture, Black Hole Recordings, Armind
- Website: www.giuseppeottaviani.com

Giuseppe Ottaviani (Italian pronunciation: [dʒuˈzɛppe ottaˈvjaːni]; born 12 November 1978) is an Italian DJ and record producer. He's best known for his 2019 album, EVOLVER, which included the hit singles Tranceland, 8K, & Panama. A long-time veteran of trance music, Ottaviani is also a member of the project Pure NRG with producer Solarstone.

In 2024, Ottaviani appeared at number 98 in the DJ Mag Top 100 DJs list.

== Biography ==
Giuseppe Ottaviani began studying piano at the age of 4 in Viterbo, a small Italian town near Rome. After attending music school in his early childhood and studying classical music as a teenager, he discovered electronic music. He started to play his first DJ sets at clubs and on local radio stations in 1995, and he later began to use his computer to produce his own music. He met DJs Andrea Ribeca and Giacomo Miccichè in 1999, and they decided to start the music project NU NRG; the group began releasing tracks on Vandit Records in 2001.

Giuseppe left NU NRG in 2005 to pursue a solo career. Most of his tracks are released on Vandit, such as "Linking People", "Through Your Eyes", and "No More Alone", with the vocals of Stephen Pickup.

== Discography ==
=== Studio albums ===
- 2009 - Go!
- 2013 - Magenta
- 2016 - Alma
- 2019 - Evolver
- 2022 - Horizons (Part 1)
- 2022 - Horizons (Part 2)
- 2022 - Horizons (Part 3)

=== Other albums ===
- 2011 - Go - On Air
- 2014 - Giuseppe Ottaviani presents Go on Air

=== Extended plays ===
- 2011 - 10 Years Vandit EP 2 (remixed by Giuseppe Ottaviani)

=== Singles ===
- 2005 - "Linking People"
- 2006 - "Through Your Eyes / Clambake"
- 2006 - "Until Monday" (with Marc van Linden)
- 2007 - "Beyond Your Thoughts" (with Santiago Nino)
- 2008 - "Far Away" (with Paul van Dyk)
- 2008 - "No More Alone" (with Stephen Pickup)
- 2009 - "Fallen" (with Faith)
- 2009 - "Our Dimension" (with John O'Callaghan)
- 2009 - "Angel" (with Faith)
- 2010 - "Ready" (with Walsh and McAuley and Emma Lock)
- 2010 - "Danceology / Lightwaves"
- 2012 - "Toys" (with Betsie Larkin)
- 2012 - "Lost for Words' (featuring Amba Shepherd)
- 2012 - "Falcons" (with Solarstone)
- 2013 - 'Earthbeat"
- 2013 - "Love Will Bring It All Around" (featuring Eric Lumiere)
- 2013 - "Magenta" (with Ferry Corsten)
- 2013 - "Gave Me" (with Seri)
- 2013 - "Cold Flame"
- 2013 - 'Waterpark"
- 2013 - "Feel the Music"
- 2013 - "In This Together" (with Alana Aldea)
- 2013 - "Heal This Empty Heart" (with Alana Aldea)
- 2014 - "I am Your Shadow" (with Audiocells and Shannon Hurley)
- 2014 - "Passion"
- 2014 - "Waiting on Someday" (with Vitamin B)
- 2014 - "Liverpool"
- 2015 - "Lean on Me"
- 2015 - "No One Like You"
- 2015 - "Encore (The Anthem)"
- 2016 - "Brightheart" (with Christian Burns)
- 2016 - "Aurora"
- 2016 - "Doctor Who"
- 2017 - "Loneliest Night" (with Tricia McTeague)
- 2017 - "Countdown"
- 2017 - "Firefly" (with Kyler England)
- 2017 - "Home" (with Jennifer Rene)
- 2017 - "Lumina"
- 2017 - "Legacy"
- 2018 - "Till the Sunrise"
- 2018 - "Jakarta"
- 2018 - "On the Way You Go" (featuring Thea Riley)
- 2018 - "Slow Emotion 3"
- 2018 - "Space Unicorn" (featuring Hypaton)
- 2018 - "Why" (featuring Clara Yates)
- 2019 - "Carbon Paper"
- 2019 - "Keep Your Dreams Alive"
- 2019 - "Panama"
- 2019 - "Tranceland"
- 2019 - "8K"
- 2019 - "Colours"
- 2019 - "Empty World"
- 2019 - "Time Shift"
- 2019 - "Another Dimension (Transmission Anthem 2019)" (with Driftmoon)
- 2019 - "Synergy" (with Factor B)
- 2019 - "Moscow River"
- 2020 - "Time to Play"
- 2020 - "Only a Heartbeat Away"
- 2020 - "I Believe" (with Lucid Blue)
- 2020 - "Not One Goodbye" (with Sue McLaren)
- 2020 - "Morpheus"
- 2020 - "Explorer"
- 2020 - "Spellbound"
- 2021 - "Glowing in the Dark"
- 2021 - "Classmate"
- 2021 - "Magico" (with Armin van Buuren)
- 2021 - "Be the Angel" (with Lucid Blue)
- 2021 - "With You" (with Monika Sanutcci)
- 2021 - "The Wind in Your Face"
- 2022 - "Fade Away" (with Mila Josef)
- 2022 - "Something I Can Dream About" (with April Bender)

=== Remixes ===
- 2006 - Woody van Eyden featuring Jimmy H. - "Y68"
- 2006 - John O'Callaghan and Bryan Kearney - "Exactly"
- 2006 - Mr. Groove and Vergas - "Just the Way I Like It"
- 2006 - Lawrence Palmer - "Streamline"
- 2006 - Greg Downey - "Vivid Intent"
- 2007 - Thomas Bronzwaer - "Close Horizon"
- 2007 - Dave202 - "Inside Outside"
- 2007 - Yoav - "Beautiful Lie"
- 2008 - Shadowrider - "Blue Horizon"
- 2008 - Jose Amnesia - "Follow Me"
- 2008 - Marc Marberg with Kyau & Albert - "Neo Love"
- 2008 - André Visior and Kay Stone - "Something for Your Mind"
- 2008 - Andy Hunter featuring Mark Underdown - "Stars"
- 2009 - Paul van Dyk featuring Johnny McDaid - "We are One"
- 2009 - John O'Callaghan featuring Lo-Fi Sugar - "Never Fade Away"
- 2009 - Tom Colontonio - "Mercury Retrograde"
- 2009 - Activa - "Rise Above / Get on with It"
- 2009 - Talla 2XLC vs. Robert Burian - "Déjà Vu"
- 2009 - Fabio XB and Andrea Mazza - "Light to Lies"
- 2009 - Filo & Peri featuring Eric Lumiere - "Soul and the Sun"
- 2009 - Dave 202 - "Pictures in My Mind"
- 2009 - Stoneface and Terminal - "Blue Print"
- 2009 - Andrea Mazza and Gabriel Cage - "Das Boot"
- 2010 - Sly One vs. Jurrane - "Everything to Me"
- 2010 - System F - "Out of the Blue 2010"
- 2010 - Orla Feeney - "Lesson Learned"
- 2010 - Francis Davilla - "Let's Go Out"
- 2010 - Chris Metcalfe - "Outback"
- 2011 - Solid Globe - "North Pole"
- 2011 - Gareth Emery - "Sanctuary"
- 2011 - Hannah & Miami Calling - "Taking Over Now"
- 2011 - Aly & Fila - "Rosaires"
- 2011 - Paul Webster - "Circus"
- 2011 - Armin van Buuren featuring VanVelzen - "Take Me Where I Wanna Go"
- 2011 - NU NRG - "Butterfly (GO 2011 Mix)"
- 2011 - Giuseppe Ottaviani - "Linking People (2011 Mix)"
- 2011 - Marcos - "Cosmic String (GO 2011 Mix)"
- 2011 - Castaneda - "Floor Control (GO 2011 Mix)"
- 2011 - John O'Callaghan and Giuseppe Ottaviani - "Ride the Wave (GO Mix)"
- 2011 - Eddi Bitar - "Beirut"
- 2011 - Andrea Mazza and Max Denoise - "State of Soul"
- 2011 - Greame Pollock - "Omni"
- 2011 - Chris Schweizer - "343"
- 2011 - Italian Mafia - "Dream"
- 2012 - Paul van Dyk featuring Plumb - "I Don't Deserve You"
- 2012 - Paul van Dyk featuring Adam Young - "Eternity"
- 2012 - Solarstone and Giuseppe Ottaviani - "Falcons (On Air Mix)"
- 2013 - Armin van Buuren featuring Trevor Guthrie - "This is What It Feels Like"
- 2013 - Giuseppe Ottaviani and Eric Lumiere - "Love Will Bring It All Around (On Air Mix)"
- 2013 - Giuseppe Ottaviani and Ferry Corsten - "Magenta (On Earth Mix)"
- 2013 - Bobina with Ana Criado - "For Who I Am"
- 2013 - John O'Callaghan featuring Erica Curran - "I Believe"
- 2013 - Dash Berlin and Alexander Popov featuring Jonathan Mendelsohn - "Steal You Away"
- 2013 - Solarstone featuring Lemon - "Lovers"
- 2014 - Winkee - "Awakening"
- 2015 - Sean Mathews - "Paradise"
- 2015 - Paul van Dyk featuring Tricia McTeague - "In Your Arms"
- 2015 - Paul van Dyk featuring Sue McLaren - "Lights"
- 2015 - Digital Dreamerz - "Perception"
- 2016 - Gareth Emery - "I Could be Stronger (But Only for You)"
- 2016 - Sean Tyas - "Reach Out"
- 2016 - APD - "Inscribe"
- 2016 - Armin van Buuren featuring Lyrica Anderson - "Gotta be Love"
- 2017 - Solarstone featuring Meredith Call - "I Found You"
- 2017 - First State featuring Sarah Howells - "Reverie"
- 2017 - Solarstone and Indecent Noise – "Querencia"
- 2017 - Rafael Osmo - "Renaissance"
- 2018 - Markus Schulz - "Safe from Harm"
- 2018 - Aly & Fila and Sue McLaren - "Surrender"
- 2019 - Ruben de Ronde - "Games"
- 2019 - Armin van Buuren and Avian Grays featuring Jordan Shaw - "Something Real"
- 2019 - Ascension - "Someone"
- 2020 - Starpicker - "Neversea"
- 2020 - Gareth Emery featuring Annabel - "You'll be OK"
- 2020 - Jes - "We Belong to the Night"
- 2020 - Chicane featuring Bryan Adams - "Don't Give Up"
- 2020 - Craig Connelly and Siskin - "All for Love"
- 2020 - Cold Blue - "August Rain"
- 2021 - Dennis Sheperd and Sunlounger - "I Can Feel"
- 2023 - Scooter - "Hyper Hyper"

== Awards ==
- 2006 - Trance Award for Best Live Act
- 2007 - Trance Award for Best Live Act
