= 100 Reasons to Live =

Studio album by Gareth Emery
- Released: 1 April 2016
- Recorded: 2015–16
- Genre: EDM
- Length: 70:14
- Label: Garuda, Armada Music
- Producer: Gareth Emery

Gareth Emery chronology
Drive (2014)	100 Reasons to Live (2016)	The Lasers (2020)

Singles from 100 Reasons to Live
- 1. "Hands" Released: 3 June 2015; 2. "Reckless" Released: 19 February 2016; 3. "CVNT5" Released: 11 March 2016; 4. "Far From Home" Released: 29 April 2016; 5. "Lost" Released: 27 May 2016; 6. "I Could Be Stronger" Released: 10 June 2016; 7. "Until We Meet Again" Released: 24 June 2016; 8. "The Story So Far" Released: 8 July 2016; 9. "Save Me" Released: 22 July 2016; 10. "We Were Young" Released: 16 September 2016

100 Reasons to Live is the third studio album produced by EDM artist Gareth Emery, released on 1 April 2016 through Garuda Records and Armada Music. The album is the follow-up to Gareth's second studio album Drive, released in 2014. The album includes the singles "Reckless", "Hands", "Far From Home", and "CVNT5".

== Track listing ==
No.	Title	Length
1.	"The Story So Far"	6:43
2.	"Cloudline" (featuring Joseph)	6:54
3.	"Far From Home" (featuring Gavrielle)	3:50
4.	"Reckless" (featuring Wayward Daughter)	3:22
5.	"We Were Young" (featuring Alex & Sierra)	4:03
6.	"CVNT5" (featuring Ashley Wallbridge)	4:37
7.	"Make It Happen" (featuring Lawson)	3:13
8.	"Hands" (featuring Alastor & London Thor)	4:22
9.	"Lost" (featuring Janet Devlin)	4:31
10.	"Save Me" (featuring Christina Novelli)	6:14
11.	"Until We Meet Again" (featuring Ben Gold)	5:25
12.	"I Could Be Stronger (But Only for You)" (featuring Corey Sanders)	3:43
13.	"Sansa"	8:31
14.	"Cruiser" (featuring Alex Sonata) (bonus track)	4:49

== Music videos ==
- "Reckless"
- "Hands"
- "CVNT5"
- "Far From Home (Craig Connelly Remix)"
- "Lost"
- "Save Me"

== Charts ==
Chart (2016)	Peak position
Dutch Albums (Album Top 100)	36
UK Albums (OCC)	170
UK Dance Albums (OCC)	6

== Release history ==
Country	Release date
Worldwide	1 April 2016
