= Gareth Emery =

British music producer and DJ (born 1980)

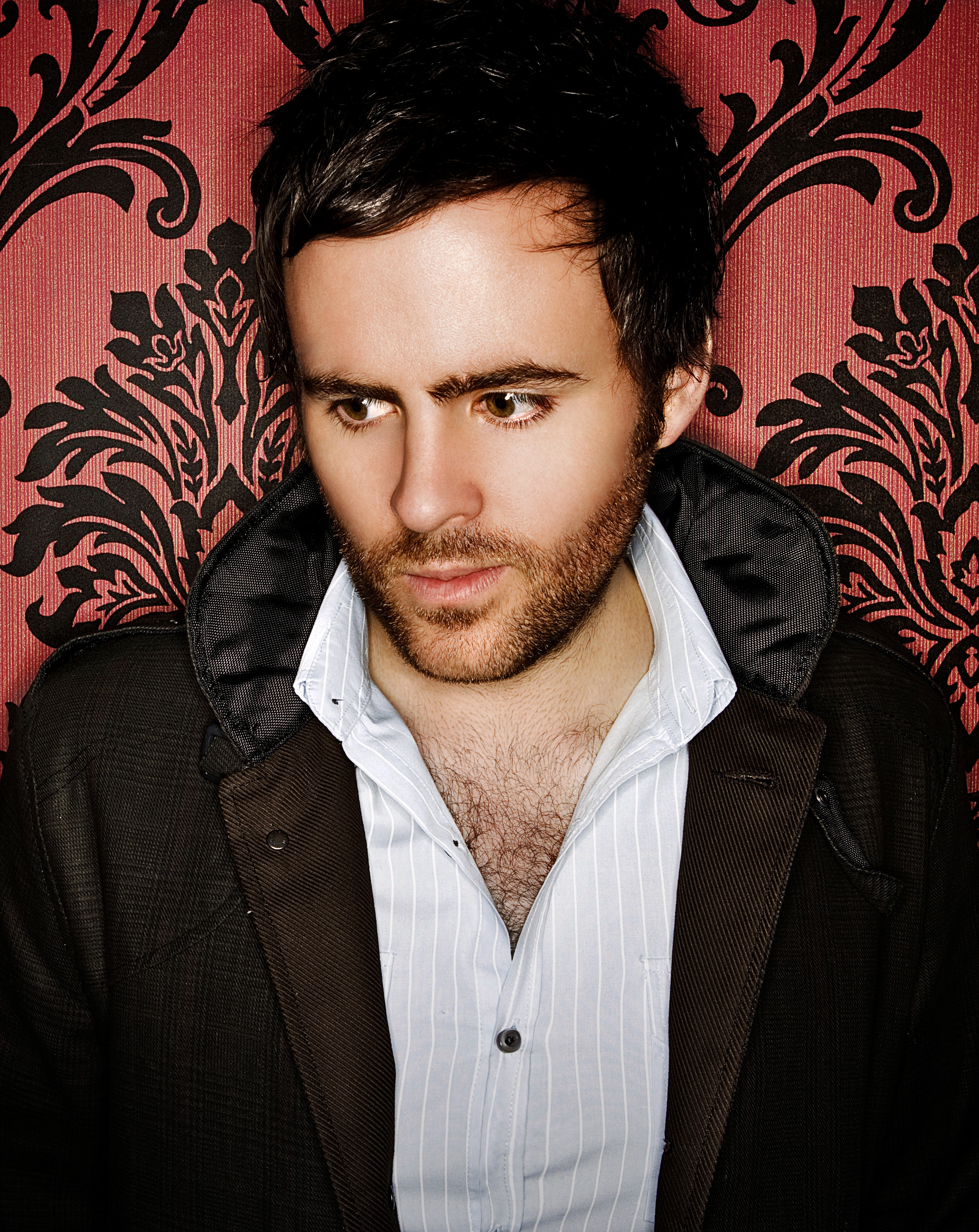
- Emery in 2008

Background information
- Also known as: GTR; Rue De Gar; Runaway
- Born: Gareth Thomas Rhys Emery; 18 July 1980 (age 46); Southampton, Hampshire, England
- Genres: Trance; progressive house
- Occupations: Music producer; DJ
- Years active: 2002–present
- Labels: Five AM; Garuda; Monstercat
- Website: garethemery.com

Gareth Thomas Rhys Emery (born 18 July 1980) is a British trance music producer and DJ. Best known for his first three studio albums Northern Lights, Drive and 100 Reasons to Live, he is considered as one of the most influential trance artists in the first 20 years of 21st century, and has won A State of Trance Tune of the Year award three times.

== Background ==
Gareth Emery was born in Southampton, England, United Kingdom His sister is the singer-songwriter Roxanne Emery. He lived in Southampton until the age of 26 before relocating to Manchester where he had a studio and ran a night club and record label, both called Garuda. He has a degree in Politics from University of Warwick and is trained in classical piano. Prior to becoming involved in electronic music he played guitar in a punk band in the mid-nineties. He now lives in Los Angeles with his wife Kat and two daughters.

Emery's production style is influenced by various genres of electronic dance music.

== Breakthrough ==
Emery's debut vinyl release was a white label remix of The Shrink's "Nervous Breakdown" which was released in early 2002. However, the track that launched his career is generally considered to be his third release: GTR – "Mistral". It was created entirely on a computer over the course of a two-week holiday in Provence. Paul van Dyk debuted the track live on the radio during the Nature One Festival in 2002 and it subsequently received support from some of the world's leading DJs, including Tiësto, Armin van Buuren and Ferry Corsten.

Emery was ranked at #34 in DJ Mag's Top 100 poll in 2006, #31 in 2007, #23 in 2008, #9 in 2009 and #7 in 2010. In 2011, Emery dropped to #13. He was ranked at #14 in 2012, and dropped further to #51 in 2013. in 2014 he dropped to #74, and in 2015 he is out of the DJ Mag Poll.

== Albums and hits ==
His debut artist album Northern Lights was released in 2010, and climbed to no.1 in the US iTunes dance chart. The album also contained one of his most successful tracks and his first ever vocal production "Sanctuary", which was voted the 2nd biggest track of 2010 by listeners of Armin van Buuren's A State Of Trance radio show, and then became the most played record of 2011 on US' Sirius XM Radio dance station, BPM. In 2011, a remixed edition of the album was released entitled Northern Lights Re-Lit with remixes by acts including Hardwell, Arty, Giuseppe Ottaviani, John O’Callaghan, Lange and Ashley Wallbridge.

Emery released "Concrete Angel" with Christina Novelli in 2012, and was voted as "Tune of the Year" by listeners of Armin van Buuren's Radioshow A State of Trance.

On 1 April 2014, Emery released his second studio album Drive, which was followed by Drive Refueled remix album a year later. The Bryan Kearney remix of the leading single "U" won the "Tune of the Year" of A State of Trance at the end of 2014.

On 1 April 2016, Emery released his third studio album 100 Reasons to Live, featuring collaborations with Alex & Sierra, Janet Devlin, Lawson and Christina Novelli, the remixes of the album was titled 1000 Reasons to Live, featuring remixes of artists such as Ferry Corsten, Giuseppe Ottaviani and Ashley Wallbridge. By the end of that year, the Standerwick remix of "Reckless", a single with Wayward Daughter, was voted 2nd for the "Tune of the Year" of A State of Trance, making Emery's 4th time top-2 finish in the chart. In the album, Emery has also released a single "CVNT5" together with Ashley Wallbridge. The "CVNT5" music video is a satirical view on careers of popular electronic dance music acts.

On 30 January 2017, Emery released a single titled "Saving Light" with artists Standerwick and Haliene on the Canadian label Monstercat. The song and its music video were a collaboration with the charity Ditch The Label in an effort to prevent bullying among children and young adults. The music video for Saving Light has received over 2 million views on YouTube as of December 2017. On 21 December, Armin van Buuren announced that Saving Light won the A State of Trance "Tune of the Year" for 2017.

In 2019, following their various collaborations over the years, Emery released an album alongside Ashley Wallbridge called Kingdom United.

On 9 July 2020, Emery released the album, The Lasers, while the first single of the album "You'll Be OK" achieved 2nd place on A State of Trance once again. In June 2022, he confirmed that the upcoming Analog would be his last artist album, which was later released on 9 December 2022. These two last albums of his contained more Synth-pop and even Britpop elements, distinguishing from the previous ones which were mostly trance/progressive house tracks.

During his career, Emery has released five compilation mix CDs during his career: The Five AM Sessions (2005), The Podcast Annual (2007), The Sound Of Garuda (2009) and The Sound Of Garuda: Chapter 2 (2011) and Electric For Life in 2015.

In 2006, Emery remixed "Flow" by Vinny Troia and Jaidene Veda on Curvve Recordings, which climbed to #24 on Billboard magazine's "Hot Dance Club Play" charts.

== DJ Mag controversy ==
Between 2006 and 2013 Emery ranked in DJ Mag's Top 50 DJs in the world, peaking at No. 7 in 2010. However, in 2013, he publicly denounced the poll due to the huge marketing budgets involved, asking fans no longer to vote for him, and donated his marketing budget to charity instead:

So here's an alternative Top 100 message: Don't vote for me. Seriously, when you buy a ticket to see me in a club, I consider that a vote. When you blast my music in your car, or share it on Facebook, or tell your friends about it, that's a vote too. Those votes, and the amazing support you've shown over the last year, is what matters to me.

This move was covered by many dance music blogs.

== Labels ==
From 2003 to 2008, Emery co-owned now defunct label Five AM under which some of his biggest hits from the time were released (Mistral / This Is That / More Than Anything). In late 2008 he left Five AM and started a new label called Garuda.

The first Garuda release was his own record Exposure / Metropolis released in May 2009, since then all Emery's records during the existence of the label had been released through Garuda. It was named after the bird-like creature from Hindu and Buddhist mythology, which Emery became aware of whilst touring Indonesia. The label had released records by artists including Ben Gold, Tritonal, M.I.K.E. and Blake Jarrell. The label also ran occasional club nights. Guests had included Ferry Corsten, Markus Schulz, Above & Beyond (band) and Sander Van Doorn. From 2014 to 2019, Garuda was part of Armin van Buuren's record label Armada Music as Emery being an Armada artist. Garuda's last release was "Still Alive" in 2020, a single by Ashley Wallbridge in collaboration with American singer Evan Henzi which was written after Ashley's recovery from a serious meningitis.

== Satire ==
On 11 March 2016, Emery released single "CVNT5" together with Ashley Wallbridge. The "CVNT5" music video is a satirical view on careers of popular electronic dance music acts. The video featured two aspiring DJs played by Emery and Wallbridge who hoped to appear on the Forbes Highest-Paid DJs list. They climbed to international stardom by hiring a ghost-producer to create their songs and buying many Twitter followers, while dressing in ludicrous clothing and wigs. The song later appeared on Emery's third studio album 100 Reasons to Live. They released a second single on 19 March 2016 titled "They Don't Want Us To Win", which featured a sample from DJ Khaled saying "win" in the song's buildup. Wallbridge revealed that the project came to light during a drunken conversation in a pub, which purpose was to "have a laugh" and satirise the clichés in dance culture.

The duo released a follow-up video through YouTube titled "DJ Mag Corruption Exposed: A CVNT5 Documentary" on 14 October 2016. The mockumentary showed CVNT5 continuing their attempt to reach number one on DJ Mag's annual Top 100 DJs list, notably by investing $50,000 into advertising, paying a black market Vietnamese click farm to generate votes, and bribing key figures in DJ Mag. CVNT5 ended up winning number two on the rankings despite their efforts, likely due to another individual paying the magazine's Editor In Chief with a diamond-encrusted watch. Critics felt that the video served as criticism to DJ Mag's list; referring to the time in 2015 where DJs Dimitri Vegas & Like Mike won first place under suspicious circumstances, specifically by vote buying and having staff members walk around with iPads at their performing venues to secure extra votes.

On 18 June 2018, American video streaming service go90 announced eight episodes of "We Are CVNT5", which will expand on the original CVNT5 mockumentary. The series was directed by Matt Enlow, written by Emery, Alex Madden and Geraint Jones, and featured Paul Holowaty, Taylor Misiak, Dillon Francis, and Pete Tong. The series was based heavily on Emery's musical experience during the United States' electronic dance music boom. A trailer for the series was released on 25 June 2018. Emery revealed through Facebook that the project encountered many issues during its production, including "tears", "screaming", and lawsuits, but managed to complete it in time. All eight episodes of "We Are CVNT5" were made available on 28 June 2018.

== Shows ==
=== Podcast and SiriusXM show ===
Since March 2006, Emery has produced the "Gareth Emery Podcast". It has been nominated for "Best Podcast" at the Miami Winter Music Conference's International Dance Music Awards three times. In July 2012, Emery launched a syndicated radio show in North America called "Gareth Emery Presents" on the SiriusXM channel Electric Area (Channel 52). The show is broadcast at 5pm ET Fridays with a repeat at 8pm ET Tuesdays.

In November 2014, Emery announced that Episode 310 would be the final episode of the "Gareth Emery Podcast". He explained on social media:

After doing the show more or less every week since 2006 I guess I'd become a bit too comfortable, and I sometimes felt like I was producing the show on auto pilot for the last year or so. Saying the same old **** and playing the same sounding music, and probably playing it a bit too safe, choosing the obvious bangers and hot promos rather than pushing myself to dig out those hidden gems like I always used to.

Emery then followed up with an announcement of a new podcast from his new SiriusXM show called "ELECTRIC FOR LIFE"

=== Electric For Life ===
Electric For Life is Emery's new brand which replaced the eight year old Gareth Emery Podcast in November 2014. It is a radio show, live show, and charitable foundation. All proceeds from the Electric For a Life Foundation shows are donated to help vulnerable groups in society. The first show was a fundraiser for the Greater Vancouver Food Bank which raised $15,000.

On 28 November 2015, Emery hosted Electric For Life Day, a 24-hour live broadcast involving Armin van Buuren, Paul van Dyk, W&W, Above & Beyond, Markus Schulz, Aly & Fila, Dash Berlin, Cosmic Gate and Seven Lions. During the show he hosted an Electric For Life stage at the Stereosonic festival in Sydney.

However, after episode 120 of the show, Emery announced that Electric For Life would come to an end as well: "After 10 years & 430 episodes, I need a new challenge ... [w]hen I started my podcast in 2006 it was one of the first dance podcasts. It was needed. Now, there are thousands of great shows – you’re in good hands."

=== Laserface ===
Laserface was a concert series running from 2017 to 2020, featuring high-powered laser displays synchronized with his live DJ sets. Developed with laser designer Anthony Garcia, the show focused on laser technology rather than traditional EDM visuals like LED screens and pyrotechnics. It toured major cities across North America and Europe, receiving acclaim for its technical precision and immersive effects.

The series set new standards for laser integration in live music, influencing Emery’s subsequent projects, including LSR/CITY. Laserface performances, such as the one at Bill Graham Civic Auditorium, showcased over 100 lasers, demonstrating its scale and impact on EDM production.

=== LSR/CITY ===
In 2021, Gareth Emery introduced LSR/CITY, an immersive electronic dance music project that integrates synchronized laser displays, 3D digital environments, and live performances. The project launched alongside an NFT collection featuring original music paired with laser-inspired virtual environments, marking Emery’s exploration of blockchain technology in music.

The first LSR/CITY concert debuted in May 2022 during EDC Week in Las Vegas. Following its success, the LSR/CITY V2 tour expanded to multiple cities across North America, incorporating live vocals and on-stage music to enhance the experience. In 2024, the LSR/CITY V3 tour expanded to 13 cities, featuring advanced laser systems and 3D visuals, with a sold-out performance at Vancouver’s Pacific Coliseum as a highlight. Emery plans to debut the LSR/CITY: CYBERPUNK tour in 2025, featuring custom-built lasers, a cyberpunk-inspired theme, and live performances. He described the upcoming tour as "a journey into a dystopian future where music and technology collide."

== Discography ==
Gareth Emery's production aliases include GTR, Cupa, Digital Blues and a house project under the name Runaway. His production history includes collaborations with artists including Lange, Solid Globe, Jon O’Bir and CERN with releases on a number of labels.

=== Albums ===
==== Studio albums ====
- Northern Lights (2010)
- Drive (2014)
- 100 Reasons to Live (2016)
- The Lasers (2020)
- Analog (2022)

==== Remix albums ====
- Northern Lights Re-Lit (2011)
- Drive: Refueled (2015)
- 1000 Reasons to Live (2016)
- The Lasers: Unplugged (2020)

=== Collaborative albums ===
- Kingdom United (with Ashley Wallbridge) (2019)

=== Extended plays ===
- The Ego Surfing (2005)

=== Singles ===
- "The Verdict" (2006)
- "Another You, Another Me" (2006)
- "Soul Symbol" (2007)
- "More Than Anything" (2007)
- "This Is New York" (2007)
- "Exposure" (2009)
- Gareth Emery Presents Rue De Gar "Soul Symbol" (2009)
- "Metropolis" (2009)
- "Sanctuary" (2010)
- "On a Good Day (Metropolis)" (2010)
- "More Than Anything (remixes)" (2010)
- "Fight the Sunrise" (2011)
- "Into the Light" (2011)
- "Tokyo" (2011)
- "Concrete Angel" (featuring Christina Novelli) (2012)
- "This Is All Out" (2012)
- "The Saga" (2012)
- "DUI" (2012)
- "Meet Her in Miami" (2013)
- "Lights & Thunder" (2014)
- "Isolate" (2014)
- "We Were Young" (2016)
- "I Could Be Stronger" (2016)
- "Saving Light" (with Standerwick featuring Haliene) (2017)
- "Call to Arms" (featuring Evan Henzi) (2018)
- "Take Everything" (featuring Emma Hewitt) (2018)
- "Kingdom United" (with Ashley Wallbridge) (2019)
- "Lionheart" (with Ashley Wallbridge) (2019)
- "Electric Pirates" (with Ashley Wallbridge) (2019)
- "Amber Sun" (with Ashley Wallbridge) (2019)
- "Never Before" (with Ashley Wallbridge featuring Jonathan Mendelsohn) (2019)
- "Mezzanine" (2019)
- "Laserface 01 (Aperture)" (2019)
- "Laserface 02 (Thoughts In Pieces)" (2019)
- "Laserface 03 (Leaving You)" (2019)
- "Somebody" (featuring Kovic) (2019)
- "Yesterday" (with Nash featuring Linney) (2020)
- "You Are" (featuring Emily Vaughn) (2020)
- "You'll Be OK" (featuring Annabel) (2020)
- "Elise" (2020)
- "End of Days" (2020)
- "Gunshots" (2020)
- "CVNT5 of the Caribbean" (with Ashley Wallbridge) (2020)
- "Sad Song" (with The Lasers) (2021)
- "Friendly Fires" (featuring Dani Poppitt) (2021)
- "Calling Home" (featuring Sarah De Warren) (2021)
- "Because the Night" (with Ben Nicky & Emily Vaughn) (2022)
- "Love You For All Time" (featuring Annabel) (2022)
- "Unity" (with Omnia) (2022)
- "This Is Not The End" (featuring Roddy Woomble) (2022)
- "Dopex" (2022)
- "Forever & Always" (with Armin van Buuren featuring Owl City) (2022)
- "Breathe" (featuring Annabel) (2022)
- "California" (featuring Gid Sedgwick) (2022)
- "Missing You" (featuring Maria Lynn) (2023)
- "Vertigo" (featuring Sarah de Warren) (2023)
- "Carry On" (with Giuseppe Ottaviani featuring Sarah de Warren) (2024)
- "Fallen" (featuring 旺仔小乔) (2024)
- "Synthminds" (with Omnia) (2025)
- "Feel It" (with Ashley Wallbridge) (2025)
- "Broken Tides" (2026)
- "Dreams (CYBERPUNK intro)" (2026)
- "We'll Be OK (featuring Maria Lynn)" (2026)

=== Remixes ===
- 2009: Oceanlab - "Lonely Girl" (Gareth Emery Remix)
- 2011: Britney Spears — "I Wanna Go" (Gareth Emery Remix)
- 2015: Cosmic Gate featuring Emma Hewitt - "Going Home" (Gareth Emery Remix)
- 2018: Signum featuring Scott Mac — "Coming On Strong" (Gareth Emery and Ashley Wallbridge Remix)
- 2020: Fatum and Dylan Matthew — "Train To Nowhere" (Gareth Emery Remix)
- 2021: Will Sparks and Gareth Emery - "Next Generation" (Gareth Emery Remix)
- 2021: Morgan Page and Gian Varela featuring Fagin - "Lost" (Gareth Emery Remix)
- 2021: Matt Lange - "Shimmer" (Gareth Emery Remix)
