= John O'Callaghan (musician) =

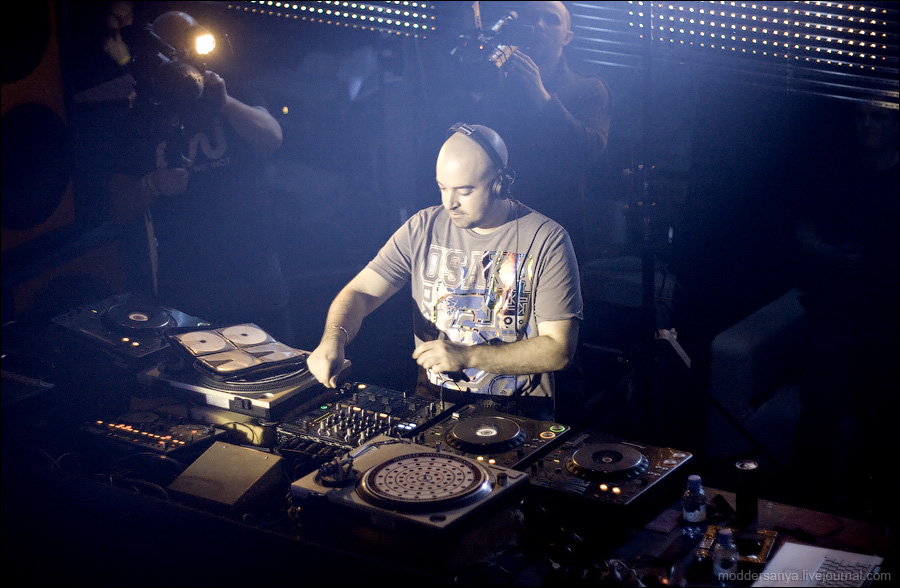
- O'Callaghan in Moscow, 2010

Background information
- Also known as: Joint Operations Centre, Mannix, Henrik Zuberstein
- Born: 21 September 1982 (age 43)
- Origin: Navan, Ireland
- Genres: Trance
- Years active: 2003–present
- Labels: Subculture; Armada Music
- Website: johnocallaghan.net

John O'Callaghan (born 21 September 1982), is an Irish musician and DJ, who mainly produces trance music. He also produces music under the aliases of Joint Operations Centre, Mannix, Henrik Zuberstein, and Stenna. He has collaborated with fellow Discover artists such as Bryan Kearney, Neal Scarborough (as Inertia), Thomas Bronzwaer (as Lost World), and Greg Downey as well as, more recently, trance hero Leon Bolier. His best-known tracks are "Exactly" with Bryan Kearney, "Big Sky", in collaboration with vocalist Audrey Gallagher, and "Find Yourself" (feat. Sarah Howells). O’Callaghan has received remixes by trance artists such as The Thrillseekers, Sean Tyas, Gareth Emery, Cosmic Gate, Markus Schulz and Indecent Noise. He has also worked with Heatbeat and Aly & Fila.

== Achievements ==
O'Callaghan formerly had the majority of his work released on Discover, the British record label set up by John Askew. Later, his work has been released by Armada Music and its sublabels—primarily on Armind and Soundpiercing. The remix of his vocal trance production "Big Sky" by Agnelli & Nelson was voted "Tune of The Year" by listeners of Armin van Buuren's A State of Trance radio show in 2007.

In 2008, O'Callaghan entered the DJ Mag 100 at number 60 and picked up two awards at the Irish Dance Music Awards, winning Best Producer and Best DJ. John also became the first Irishman to play Trance Energy. In 2009, he rose 36 places to 24th in the DJ Mag 100.

In addition to numerous single releases, he has released a live album (Discover "Live As" Volume 2) and two artist albums, Something To Live For and Never Fade Away.

Never Fade Away was released in 2009 on the Armada label shortly following the single release of "Find Yourself (feat. Sarah Howells)". "Find Yourself" was tipped a future favorite on A State Of Trance. The track has received recognition from many DJs, including Armin van Buuren, Tiesto, Judge Jules, Matt Hardwick and Gareth Emery. The track has also received a remix from Cosmic Gate, which made a lot of headway in many DJs' set lists following its release. O'Callaghan also released another single from the album, "Surreal", which includes vocals from an artist known as Jaren. 2010 also marked the start of John's very own sublabel on Black Hole Recordings called Subculture.

== Discography ==
=== Studio albums ===
- Something to Live For (2007)
- Never Fade Away (2009)
- Never Fade Away (The Remixes) (2011)
- Unfold (2011)
- Unfold (The Remixes) (2012)
- Subculture (2018) (John O'Callaghan and Cold Blue)

=== Mix albums ===
- Live As... Volume 2 (2007)
- Trance World Volume 4 (2008)
- Trance Energy 2009 (2009)
- Subculture (2009)
- Subculture 2010 (2010)
- Subculture 2011 (2011)
- Subculture 2013 (2013)
- Subculture: The Residents (2014)

=== Singles ===
- Symmetric (with Cold Blue) (2018)
