= Solid Globe =

Dutch trance project

Solid Globe is a Dutch progressive trance project by two members Nic Vegter (also involved in writing and producing in "The Classified Project" and "Nickelson") and Raz Nitzan (writer and producer behind "Perpetuous Dreamer" together with Armin van Buuren and Elles de Graaf) . The band took off in 2003 with the hit song "North Pole" which stayed at the top of Dutch dance charts for two consecutive weeks. The project is supported by leading DJs such as Armin van Buuren and Tiësto. "North Pole" was soon followed by "Sahara", which was nominated for Best Dance Song of the Year 2004.

Solid Globe is known for their sophisticated, progressive trance sound, their unique song titles, their contemplative ambient breakdowns, and their distinctive lead synths. Although they have not released a complete album, all of their songs are available on 12' vinyl. All their songs have been released on the Fundamental label.

List of Solid Globe songs (in order of release date):

- "South Pole"
- "North Pole"
- "Sahara"
- "Kalahari"
- "Lost Cities"
- "Found"
- "Black Wood"
- "Crystal Water (Woken)"
