= Bryan Kearney =

Irish EDM DJ/producer

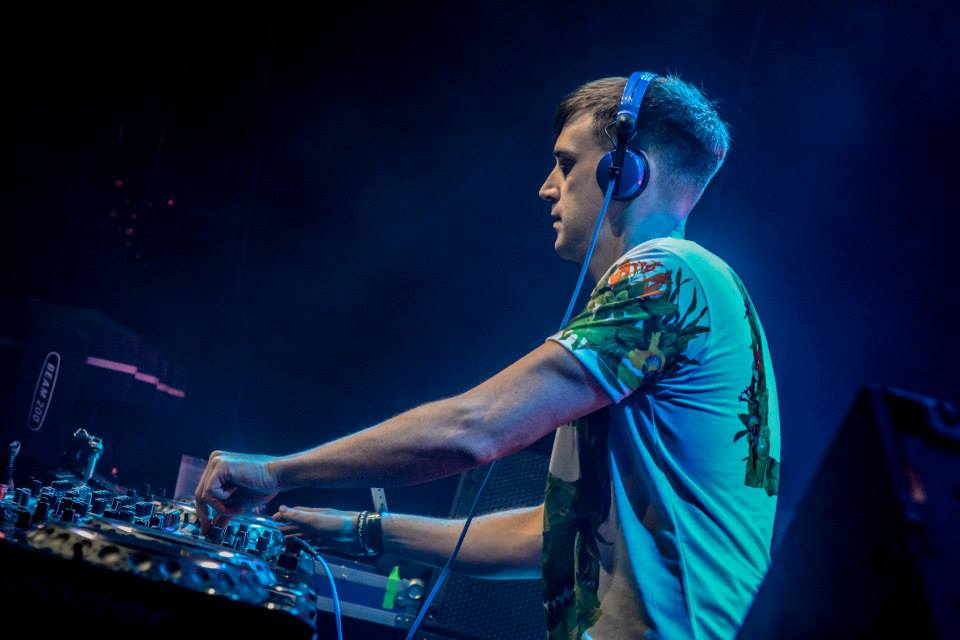
- Kearney in A State Of Trance Argentina 2015

Background information
- Also known as: Kearnage, Spunuldrick, The Roecorder, Karney, Key4050
- Origin: Dublin, Ireland
- Genres: Tech trance, uplifting trance, psy-trance
- Years active: 2002-present
- Labels: Kearnage, Subculture, Armind, Discover Recordings
- Website: http://bryankearney.com/

Bryan Kearney (/ˈkɑːrni/) is an Irish DJ/producer in electronic dance music, mostly in trance, particularly uplifting trance and tech trance. His tracks have been remixed by the likes of Giuseppe Ottaviani, John Askew, Activa, and Heatbeat.

== Biography ==
Bryan Kearney began DJing when he was 19 years old. As a DJ, he has been featured on Dublin's pirate radio stations such as Energy FM and Kiss FM. He was on regular rotation at Dublin clubnights like Fusion and Letrik, as well as being a resident for Ian Booth's Trancelation nights.

He has also performed in venues across the globe, playing at some of the world leading dance events including the Sunrise Festival in Poland, and Sensation White in Melbourne, Australia.

At the same time he started DJing, Bryan Kearney began producing and has since released tracks across many different genres of dance music. In 2006, he produced the song "Exactly" with John O'Callaghan, and it was remixed by one of his idols, Giuseppe Ottaviani of NU-NRG. "Exactly" was requested for no less than fifteen album compilations. His techno-flavored tune More To Life became the biggest selling download ever on Discover Records label. In 2010 Bryan set up his own Trance & Tech Trance label Kearnage Recordings, which has gained worldwide success over the last 10 years due to its consistency of releasing high quality music.

== Discography ==
=== Singles & Collaborations ===
- Bryan Kearney - Goosebumps
- John O'Callaghan & Bryan Kearney - Restricted Motion
- John O'Callaghan & Bryan Kearney - Exactly
- Sneijder & Bryan Kearney - Proper Order
- Sneijder & Bryan Kearney - Next Level
- Bryan Kearney pres. Karney - I've Had My Fun
- Bryan Kearney pres. Karney - Ridiculous
- Bryan Kearney pres. Karney - Backbreaker
- Bryan Kearney - More To Life/Punchline
- Bryan Kearney presents Spunuldrick - The Walrus
- Bryan Kearney - You Will Never Be Forgotten
- Bryan Kearney - Stealth Bomber (Original Mix)
- Bryan Kearney - Awaken
- Bryan Kearney - Get The Edge
- Bryan Kearney - Punchline
- Bryan Kearney - Mexican Rave
- Indecent Noise & Brian Kearney - Uncommon World
- Bryan Kearney - The Nettle
- Bryan Kearney - Te Amo

- 2015 -

- Bryan Kearney - Comfort Zone
- Bryan Kearney pres. Karney - Say Nothing
- Bryan Kearney - The Next Chapter
- Bryan Kearney & Will Rees - Prime Example
- Bryan Kearney - Wake Up Call
- Bryan Kearney & Coming Soon - Activate

- 2016 -

- Bryan Kearney & Coming Soon - Anti Social Media
- Bryan Kearney & Will Atkinson - The Game Changer
- Bryan Kearney & Vini Vici - We Are The Creators
- Bryan Kearney presents Karney. - El Gato
- Bryan Kearney presents Karney. - Beg Your Pardon
- Bryan Kearney & Christina Novelli - By My Side

- 2017 -

- Bryan Kearney - Adrenaline
- Bryan Kearney & WAIO - Futura
- Bryan Kearney presents Karney. - Smiler
- Bryan Kearney & Plumb - All Over Again

- 2018 -

- Bryan Kearney & Berg - Deeper
- Bryan Kearney presents Karney feat. Shugz - Floorburn
- Bryan Kearney & Deirdre McLaughlin - Open My Mind
- Bryan Kearney - Something Out Of Nothing

=== Remixes ===
- 2013 : Indecent Noise - Phobia (Bryan Kearney Remix)
- John Askew - Battery Acid (Bryan Kearney for the neighbour's Remix)
- Solarstone - Please (Bryan Kearney Remix)
- John O'Callaghan - Rotterdam (Bryan Kearney Remix)
- Dave Schiemann - Shade (Bryan Kearney Remix)
- Mix Factory - Take Me Away (Bryan Kearney's Planet Love MakeOver)
- Fire & Ice - Lost Emotions (Bryan Kearney Remix)
- Tony De Vit - The Dawn (Bryan Kearney Remix)
- Melly - Arrival (Bryan Kearney Edit)
- Sean Tyas - Lift (Bryan Kearney Edit)
- Gareth Emery feat. Bo Bruce - U (Bryan Kearney Remix)
- Armin van Buuren feat. Jan Vayne - Senerity (Bryan Kearney Remix)
- Aly & Fila Feat. Rafif - Mother Nature (Bryan Kearney Remix)
- Plumb - Need You Now (How Many Times) (Bryan Kearney Remix)
- Armin van Buuren - Together (Bryan Kearney Remix)
- Easton feat. Roxanne Emery - Healing Rain (Bryan Kearney Remix)
- Dario G - Sunchyme (Brean Kearney Bootleg Mix)
- Bryn Liedl feat. Bethany Marie - Statues (Bryan Kearney Remix)
- Cosmic Baby - Fantasia (Bryan Kearney Remix)
- Gareth Emery feat. Bo Bruce - U (Bryan Kearney Remix)

== Radio show ==
He also hosts a bi-weekly radio show/podcast called KEARNAGE, that airs on Afterhours.FM radio. It can also be downloaded as a podcast.

== Awards and honors ==
- Voted as second best set at The Sunrise Festival 2008.
- Runner up in Best Producer category at the 2009 Irish Dance Music Awards (second to John O'Callaghan).
- In 2014, his remix of Gareth Emery's track "U" was voted tune of the year on Armin Van Buuren's popular radio show "A State Of Trance". His track "All Over Again" with Plumb was voted No. 2 in the "Tune Of The Year 2017."
- In 2022, his track "Take this" released in collaboration with Out of the dust feat. Plumb, was voted as the "Tune Of The Year" in the legendary Dutch radio show "A State Of Trance".
