= A State of Trance Ibiza 2014 at Ushuaïa =

Compilation album by Armin van Buuren
- Released: 12 September 2014
- Recorded: 2014
- Genres: Trance; progressive trance
- Length: 2:23:05
- Label: Armada
- Producer: Armin van Buuren

Armin van Buuren chronology
A State of Trance 2014 (2014)	A State of Trance Ibiza 2014 at Ushuaïa (2014)	Armin Anthems (Ultimate Singles Collected) (2014)

Singles from A State of Trance Ibiza 2014 at Ushuaïa
- 1. "Hystereo" Released: 5 September 2014

A State of Trance Ibiza 2014 at Ushuaïa is the first compilation album in the A State of Trance Ibiza compilation series mixed and compiled by the Dutch DJ and record producer Armin van Buuren. It was released on 9 September 2014 by Armada Music.

In 2014, Armin van Buuren left his Ibiza residencies in Privilege Ibiza or Amnesia and became DJ resident at Ushuaïa Ibiza Beach Hotel. He decided to share the best tracks from his sets in a new double mix compilation series to replace the former Universal Religion series.

== Track listing ==
Disc one
No.	Title	Artist	Length
1.	"Hystereo (Intro Mix)"	Armin van Buuren	6:18
2.	"Timebomb"	David Gravell	2:08
3.	"Tomorrow People"	Omnia	2:41
4.	"Adagio for Strings"	Mark Sixma	3:49
5.	"The Reason"	Alex M.O.R.P.H. featuring Natalie Gioia	4:32
6.	"Sound of the Drums (Bobina Remix)"	Armin van Buuren featuring Laura Jansen	4:43
7.	"Alone (Thomas Newson Remix)"	Armin van Buuren featuring Lauren Evans	2:09
8.	"Toca Me"	Paul Oakenfold	1:55
9.	"Alexandria"	Faruk Sabanci	3:39
10.	"Bloody Moon"	Heatbeat	3:40
11.	"Fair Game"	Cosmic Gate & Ørjan Nilsen	4:15
12.	"Asylum"	KhoMha	2:55
13.	"Fade to Light (Joseph Areas 'Dirty Rock' Remix)"	Andy Moor	3:53
14.	"One In A Million"	Andrew Rayel featuring Jonathan Mendelsohn	1:29
15.	"Shadow (W&W Edit)"	Mark Sixma	0:58
16.	"Eternal Flame"	Alexander Popov	3:24
17.	"Destroyves"	Yves De Lacroix featuring Marell	6:19
18.	"Aerys"	Heatbeat	2:51
19.	"Falling Back"	Cosmic Gate and Eric Lumiere	2:08
20.	"Dissolve"	Simon Patterson featuring Sarah Howells	5:48
21.	"EIFORYA (Talla 2XLC 140 Remix)"	Armin van Buuren and Andrew Rayel	1:55
22.	"Exploration of Space"	Cosmic Gate	2:29
Total length:			1:10:31

Disc two
No.	Title	Artist	Length
1.	"Ping Pong (Kryder & Tom Staar Remix)"	Armin van Buuren	4:09
2.	"The District"	Andrew Bayer	4:53
3.	"Propaganda"	Dan Thompson	3:26
4.	"Red And White"	Maarten De Jong	3:44
5.	"Forces"	MaRLo, Fisherman & Hawkins	2:48
6.	"New Horizons (A State of Trance 650 Anthem) (Mark Sixma Remix)"	Jorn van Deynhoven	3:44
7.	"The Last of Us"	David Gravell	1:45
8.	"Explorer"	Arisen Flame	4:14
9.	"Let It Go (Armin van Buuren Remix)"	Idina Menzel	3:21
10.	"There Are No Words"	Andrew Rayel featuring Sylvia Tosun	3:21
11.	"Terminal (Dub Mix)"	Ayu	2:34
12.	"Remember This (Mark Sherry Remix)"	Markus Schulz	4:12
13.	"This Time (Wach Remix)"	Philippe El Sisi and Abstract Vision featuring Jilliana Danise	3:08
14.	"Horizon"	Mhammed El Alami and Illitheas	3:16
15.	"Running"	Aly & Fila with Skypatrol featuring Sue McLaren	5:07
16.	"Games (Ian Standerwick Remix)"	John O'Callaghan featuring Jennifer Rene	3:43
17.	"Eye 2 Eye (FSOE 350 Anthem)"	Aly & Fila Meets Roger Shah featuring Sylvia Tosun	3:43
18.	"Next Level"	Sneijder and Bryan Kearney	5:06
19.	"Empire of Hearts (Johann Stone Remix)"	Gaia	6:23
Total length:			1:12:34

== Charts ==
Chart (2014)	Peak position
Dutch Albums (Album Top 100)	2
Spanish Albums (Promusicae)	65
Swiss Albums (Schweizer Hitparade)	13
US Top Dance Albums (Billboard)	16

== Release history ==
Region	Date	Label	Format	Catalog
Worldwide	12 September 2014	Armada	CD, digital download	ARMA390
