= A State of Trance 2014 =

Compilation album by Armin van Buuren
- Released: 28 March 2014
- Recorded: 2014
- Genres: Trance; progressive trance
- Length: 2:29:32
- Label: Armada
- Producer: Armin van Buuren

Armin van Buuren chronology
Universal Religion Chapter 7 (2013)	A State of Trance 2014 (2014)	A State of Trance Ibiza 2014 at Ushuaïa (2014)

Singles from A State of Trance 2014
- 1. "Empire of Hearts" Released: 10 March 2014; 2. "EIFORYA" Released: 17 March 2014; 3. "Ping Pong" Released: 24 March 2014

A State of Trance 2014 is the eleventh compilation album in the A State of Trance compilation series mixed and compiled by the Dutch DJ and record producer Armin van Buuren. It was released on 28 March 2014 by Armada Music. The album consists of two sets. The album charted in the Netherlands, Switzerland and Austria.

== Track listing ==
Disc one: On the Beach
No.	Title	Artist	Length
1.	"Medusa [Intro Remix]"	Adam Szabo and Willem de Roo	4:32
2.	"Burn the Sun (featuring Nanje Nowack)"	Tommy Johnson	3:56
3.	"My Heaven (featuring Natalie Gioia)"	Alex M.O.R.P.H.	3:38
4.	"Athena"	Dart Rayne and Yura Moonlight	2:58
5.	"Once Lydian"	Andrew Bayer	4:18
6.	"End of the Road (featuring Jaren) (Hazem Beltagui Remix)"	Aly & Fila	4:55
7.	"Forever"	Bogdan Vix and Renee Stahl	5:54
8.	"Back to You (featuring Christina Novelli) (Wach Remix)"	Fabio XB and Liuck	5:23
9.	"Goodbye (featuring Alexandra Badoi)"	Andrew Rayel	3:00
10.	"Haunted (featuring Jano)"	MaRLo	3:32
11.	"Between Empires"	Soarsweep	4:08
12.	"Decibels"	Craig Connelly	3:25
13.	"U (featuring Bo Bruce) (Bryan Kearney Remix)"	Gareth Emery	5:38
14.	"Music Is More Than Mathematics"	Protoculture	4:44
15.	"Lekker"	Max Graham vs. Maarten de Jong	4:05
16.	"Destino"	Markus Schulz	4:37
17.	"RAMelia [Tribute to Amelia]"	RAM & Susana	6:19
Total length:			1:15:00

Disc two: In the Club
No.	Title	Artist	Length
1.	"EIFORYA [Intro Mix]"	Armin van Buuren and Andrew Rayel	5:21
2.	"The Late Anthem [Way Too Late Mix]"	Ørjan Nilsen	3:49
3.	"Quantum"	Alexander Popov	2:54
4.	"Phoenix"	Eximinds	4:09
5.	"Empire of Hearts"	Gaia	4:34
6.	"Kingdom of Dreams"	RAM	4:18
7.	"Mythology [Dimension Remix]"	Type 41	3:01
8.	"Visions"	MaRLo	3:12
9.	"Oblivion"	Inge Bergmann	3:46
10.	"Carthage"	Wach	3:46
11.	"New Horizons [A State of Trance 650 Anthem]"	Jorn van Deynhoven	5:06
12.	"Stole the Sun [Allen and Envy Remix]"	Dart Rayne and Yura Moonlight and Katty Heath	3:17
13.	"Marathon [Simon O’Shine Remix]"	Simon O’Shine and Adam Navel	4:45
14.	"Blackout"	Allen Watts	4:10
15.	"Siren’s Song"	James Dymond	2:19
16.	"Shine"	John Askew	4:10
17.	"Save My Night [Allen Watts Remix]"	Armin van Buuren	5:06
18.	"Ping Pong"	Armin van Buuren	6:45
Total length:			1:15:00

== Charts ==
Chart (2014)	Peak position
Austrian Albums (Ö3 Austria)	64
Dutch Albums (Album Top 100)	1
Swiss Albums (Schweizer Hitparade)	10
US Top Dance Albums (Billboard)	9

== Release history ==
Region	Date	Label	Format	Catalog
Worldwide	28 March 2014	Armada	CD	ARMA377
