= Francesco Rossi =

Francesco Rossi may refer to:

- Francesco Rossi (DJ), Italian disc jockey and record producer
- Francesco Rossi (footballer, born 1977), Italian goalkeeper
- Francesco Rossi (footballer, born 1991), Italian goalkeeper
- Francesco Rossi (Archbishop of Ferrara), Archbishop of Ferrara from 1919 to 1929
- Francesco de' Rossi (1510–1563), Italian Mannerist painter
- Francesco Rossi (composer) (born 1625), Italian composer

== See also ==
- Rossi (surname)
- Francesco Rosi (1922-2015), Italian film director
