= Ping Pong (Armin van Buuren song) =

Single by Armin van Buuren

from the album A State of Trance 2014
- Released: 24 March 2014
- Recorded: 2013–2014
- Studio: Armada Studios, Amsterdam
- Genre: Minimal trance; acid trance
- Length: 2:58 (radio edit); 7:39 (original mix)
- Label: Armind; Armada
- Songwriter(s): Armin van Buuren; Benno de Goeij
- Producer(s): Armin van Buuren; Benno de Goeij

Armin van Buuren singles chronology
"Alone" (2014)	"Ping Pong" (2014)	"Hystereo" (2014)

"Ping Pong" is a song by Dutch disc jockey and record producer Armin van Buuren. The song was released in the Netherlands by Armind on 24 March 2014. The song is included in van Buuren's compilation A State of Trance 2014. The track is known for its particular minimal trance sound of a table tennis ball sound.

The Hardwell remix has reached the status of festival anthem. It was played for the first time by Hardwell during his performance at Ultra Music Festival 2014 in Miami.

== Background and release ==
The "Ping Pong" sound was created by Armin van Buuren to include a gimmick during his Armin Only – Intense world tour in 2013. van Buuren wanted to give an homage to the famous video game Pong, released in 1972. The track became one of the most memorable moments of Armin's performances. Due to a popular demand, van Buuren created the song in two days to complete that sound.

== Music video ==
A music video to accompany the release of "Ping Pong" was first released onto YouTube on 2 May 2014. The music video was directed by Svenno Koemans. It shows a table tennis player which gets through all his matches with some large victories against his rivals. After these successes he reaches the match of his life in front one of the best player of the world. He wins again this close match thanks to a nunchaku combination to throw the ball. At the end of the video he dances with the crowd to celebrate his victory. Unfortunately he wakes up and realizes that it's only in a dream and that he has slept in the cloakrooms.

== Track listing ==
- Digital download (ARMD1173)
1. "Ping Pong" (original mix) – 7:39
- CD single (ARMA382)
1. "Ping Pong" (radio edit) – 2:58
2. "Ping Pong" (original mix) – 7:39
- Digital download – Simon Patterson remix (ARMD1177)
1. "Ping Pong" (Simon Patterson remix) – 7:20
- Digital download (ARMD1173B)
1. "Ping Pong" (radio edit) – 2:58
2. "Ping Pong" (original mix) – 7:39
3. "Ping Pong" (Simon Patterson edit) – 3:36
4. "Ping Pong" (Simon Patterson remix) – 7:20
- Digital download – Hardwell remix (ARMD1179)
1. "Ping Pong" (Hardwell remix) – 5:08
- Digital download – Kryder & Tom Staar remix (ARMD1183)
1. "Ping Pong" (Kryder & Tom Staar remix) – 4:45
- Digital download – remixes (Kontor, Germany)
1. "Ping Pong" (radio edit) – 3:38
2. "Ping Pong" (original mix) – 5:20
3. "Ping Pong" (Hardwell edit) – 3:00
4. "Ping Pong" (Hardwell remix) – 5:08
5. "Ping Pong" (Kryder & Tom Staar radio edit) – 3:01
6. "Ping Pong" (Kryder & Tom Staar remix) – 4:45
7. "Ping Pong" (Simon Patterson edit) – 3:36
8. "Ping Pong" (Simon Patterson remix) – 7:20
- Digital download – Regi & Les Mecs Go Belgium remix (CNR)
1. "Ping Pong" (Regi & Les Mecs Go Belgium remix) – 3:13

== Charts ==
Chart (2013)	Peak position
Belgium (Ultratop 50 Flanders)	38
Belgium (Ultratip Bubbling Under Wallonia)	5
Netherlands (Dutch Top 40)	22
France (SNEP)	135
