= Music Festivals Melbourne =

Music Festivals have a long history in Melbourne, Australia. One of the oldest and most famous music festival held in Australia was the Sunbury Music Festival. The Sunbury Music Festival was held from 1972 - 1975 often regarded as a milestone in Australian music for many reasons. Although it wasn't the first major music festival that Australia saw, it was the first successful music event which actually turned a profit, enough for it to run consecutively for four years. Since then Melbourne has seen a secession of great festivals. Today Melbourne is a favourite location for artists and festival goers alike.

== Festivals ==
- Stereosonic
- Big Day Out
- Creamfields
- Summadayze
- Sensation
- Solar Music Festival
- Future Music Festival
- Trick or Beat
- Blueprint Music Festival
- St Kilda Blues Festival
