= Moments (Andrew Rayel album) =

Studio album by Andrew Rayel
- Released: 5 May 2017
- Genre: Trance; big room house
- Length: 1:09:21
- Label: Armada Music
- Producer: Andrew Rayel

Andrew Rayel chronology
Find Your Harmony (2014)	Moments (2017)	Lifeline (2023)

Singles from Moments
- 1. "Winterburn" Released: 15 January 2016; 2. "Once in a Lifetime Love" Released: 11 March 2016; 3. "All Systems Down" Released: 11 August 2016; 4. "Take It All" Released: 2 December 2016; 5. "I'll Be There" Released: 17 February 2017; 6. "Connected" Released: 23 February 2017; 7. "Tacadum" Released: 17 March 2017; 8. "My Reflection" Released: 14 April 2017; 9. "Lighthouse" Released: 22 May 2017; 10. "Heavy Love" Released: 19 June 2017; 11. "Never Let Me Go" Released: 21 July 2017; 12. "Home" Released: 1 September 2017

Moments is the second studio album by Moldovan trance producer and DJ Andrew Rayel, released on 5 May 2017 through Armada Music. It is the follow-up to Rayel's debut album Find Your Harmony, which was released on 2014. The album was announced on 18 February 2017 together with a world tour which lasted from April to August 2017. 12 out of 18 songs in the album were released as singles over a two-year period from 2016 to 2017, with the lead single being “I’ll Be There” featuring American vocalist Eric Lumiere. Moments incorporates a mixture of big room-influenced trance, progressive house, psy-trance, and dubstep within its tracks.

== Background ==
After releasing his debut album titled Find Your Harmony on 2014, Andrew Rayel embarked on a three-year tour period where after his first year touring he began to be inspired by watching his fans. According to Rayel, the album single "Once in a Lifetime Love" was inspired during a tour show where one of the crowd members came on stage with Rayel's approval to propose to his girlfriend, whose proposal she accepted emotionally. Initially the title of the album was undecided and constantly changed. Rayel was close to naming it Big Time, as he wanted to reference the climax that the present was supposed to be the big time for everyone. After further consideration, he settled on the name Moments as he decided that it would fit the message better of remembering the special moments in one's life, which would be what the album aims to accomplish.

Based on Rayel, the main difference that separates his first album with Moments is that each track on the latter is special and specifically delivers the message of the album. "The first album I was doing without knowing what the f*** I am doing. I didn't think that much about it. I just made some tracks and played around with it. After that I got more experience and this album is really more well thought out," says Rayel. When asked about including a psy-trance track in his album which was a popular genre in 2016, Rayel denied that he was following the trends for profit and said, “Back then I played one of the first versions of "Tacadum" without the vocals. I really fell in love with that specific sound. In 2015 at EDC Las Vegas I closed my set with a psytrance track and saw the reaction of the people and it really inspired me." Rayel also added that it wasn't as interesting to produce a fully trance album as he did in Find Your Harmony, which was why he decided to experiment with multiple genres in Moments to challenge himself.

== Critical reception ==
Moments received positive reception from critics upon release. Kat Bein from Billboard called the album a "bold, bright future for the genre [trance]" and praised the singles in Moments for maintaining a duality of hard and soft sounds.

== Track listing ==
Writing credits adapted from AllMusic

No.	Title	Writer(s)	Length
1.	"Moments"	Andrei Rata	3:21
2.	"I'll Be There" (featuring Eric Lumiere)	Andrei Rata; Eric Lumiere	5:51
3.	"All Systems Down" (with KhoMha)	Roberto Alzate Pasos; Andrei Rata	4:35
4.	"Connected" (with ATB)	Andrei Rata; ATB	4:12
5.	"Once in a Lifetime Love" (featuring Kristina Antuna)	Kristina Antuna; Chris Garcia; Andrei Rata	3:39
6.	"My Reflection" (featuring Emma Hewitt)	Anthony Hewitt; Emma Hewitt; Andrei Rata	4:46
7.	"Forgiven" (featuring Jonathan Mendelsohn)	Jonathan Mendelsohn; Andrei Rata	3:12
8.	"Heavy Love" (with Max Vangeli featuring Kye Stones)	Iain James; Andrei Rata; Kye Sones; Max Vangeli	4:46
9.	"Home" (featuring Jonathan Mendelsohn)	Andrei Rata	4:07
10.	"Take It All" (with Jochen Miller featuring Hansen Tomas)	Joost Griffioen; Andrei Rata; Jochen Van Der Steijn; Hansen Tomas	4:12
11.	"Let It Be Forever"	Andrei Rata	4:20
12.	"Back to the Moment"	Mike James; Andrei Rata	3:53
13.	"Lighthouse" (with Christina Novelli)	Joe Lawrence; Christina Novelli; Andrei Rata	4:59
14.	"Never Let Me Go" (featuring Angelika Vee)	Andrei Rata; Angelica Vasilcov	5:32
15.	"Tacadum"	Andrei Rata	4:37
16.	"Winterburn" (with Digital X & Geert Huinink featuring Sylvia Tosun)	Peter Holub; Andrei Rata; Sylvia Tosun	3:19
Total length:			69:21

== Personnel ==
Credits adapted from AllMusic.

- Andrei Rata – composition, production
- Angelica Vasilcov – composition, vocals
- Kristina Antuna – composition
- André Tanneberger – composition, production
- Peter Holub – composition
- Chris Garcia – composition
- Joost Griffioen – composition
- Anthony Hewitt – composition
- Emma Hewitt – composition, vocals
- Geert Huinink – production
- Iain James – composition
- Mike James – composition, vocals
- Roberto Alzate Pasos – composition, production
- Joe Lawrence – composition
- Eric Lumiere – composition, vocals
- Jonathan Mendelsohn – composition, vocals
- Jochen Van Der Steijn – composition, production
- Christina Novelli – composition, vocals
- Kye Sones – composition, vocals
- Hansen Tomas – composition, vocals
- Sylvia Tosun – composition, vocals
- Max Vangeli – composition, production

== Release history ==
Region	Date	Format	Label	Reference
Worldwide	May 5, 2017	Digital download; CD	Armada Music	
