= Tom Fall =

Finnish DJ and record producer

- Birth name: Tomi Henrik Fallenius
- Born: Lohja, Finland
- Genres: Progressive house, trance
- Occupation(s): DJ, record producer

Tomi Henrik Fallenius, better known by his stage name Tom Fall, is a Finnish DJ and record producer signed to Armada Music. He has collaborated with notable trance acts including Matisse & Sadko, JES, and Jochen Miller.

== Discography ==
=== Singles ===
2010

- "Lotus/First Sight" [Backcatalogue Bvba]
- "Reflections" (with Something Good) [Silk Music]
- "Dive" [Silk Music]

2011

- "All This Time/Stillness" [Armada Music]
- "Voices" [Silk Music]
- "Untouchable" (with Jwaydan) [Armada Music]

2012

- "Ordinary World" (with Heikki L featuring Ben Andreas) [Armada Music]
- "Hammer" (with Ben Nicky) [Ava Recordings]
- "Irok" [Armada Trice]

2014

- "E18" [Armada Trice]
- "One For Love" (featuring Yoshi Breen) [Armada Trice]

2015

- "Bringin' It Back" [Armada Trice]
- "Break Free" (featuring Laces) [Armada Trice]
- "Come Back" (with Jes) [Armada Trice]

2016

- "Revival" (with Tim White) [Armada Trice]
- "Sober" (with Jochen Miller featuring Tim White) [Armada Zouk]

2017

- "Kaamos" [Armind]
- "Moonless Nights" (with First State) [A State of Trance]

2018

- "Divergent" [A State of Trance]
- "Cyclone" [Armind]
- "Typhoon" [Armind]

2019

- "Solar" [Armada Music]
- "Monsoon" (with Tanner Wilfong) [Armada Music]

2020

- "Guiding Light" [Garuda]

=== Remixes ===
- 2011 - TyDi featuring Brianna Holan - Never Go Back (Tom Fall Remix) [Armada Music]
- 2011 - Orion and J.Shore - "White Birds" (Tom Fall Remix) [Silk Music]
- 2015 - Matisse & Sadko - "Azonto" (Tom Fall Remix) [Armada Trice]
- 2016 - Shogun featuring Emma Lock - "Fly Away" (Tom Fall Remix) [Armada]
- 2016 - Joonas Hahmo - "Brainflush" (Tom Fall Remix) [Hahmo Recordings]
- 2018 - Limelght - "Don't Leave Me Now" (Tom Fall Remix) [Armada Music]
- 2018 - Kaion and High 5 - "Timeless" (Tom Fall Remix) [Serendipity Muzik]
- 2019 - Morgan Page and Haliene - "Footprints" (Tom Fall Remix) [Armada Music]
- 2019 - Gareth Emery and Ashley Wallbridge featuring PollyAnna - "Lionheart" [Garuda]
