= Florentin (musical duo) =

Israeli DJ pair

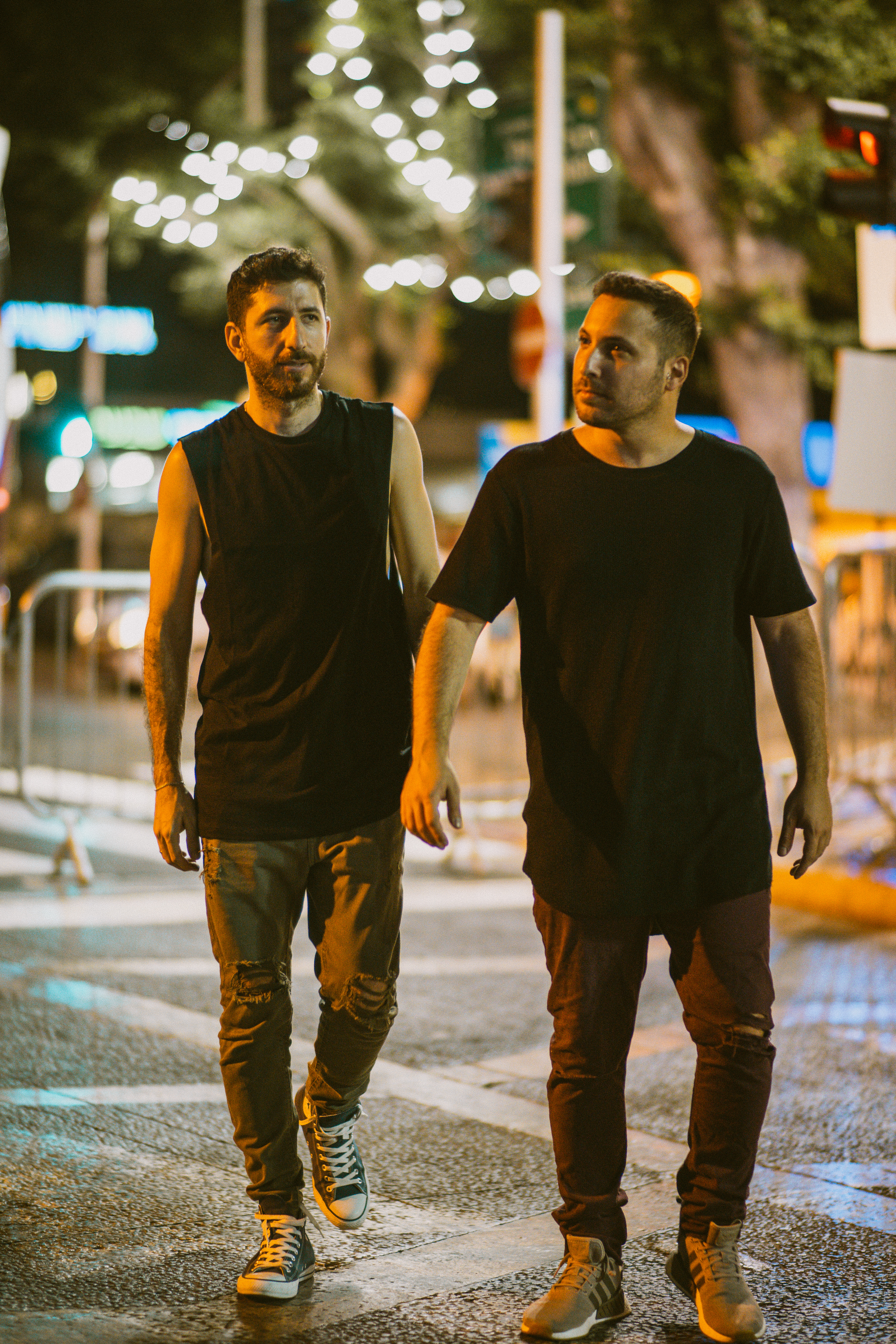
- Assaf Tuvia (right), Gal Abutbul (left)

Background information
- Born: Jerusalem, Israel
- Genres: Bigroom House; Progressive House; Bigroom Trance; Trance; Uplifting Trance; Dance-Pop
- Occupations: DJ; Record Producers; Remixer
- Instruments: Digital Audio Workstation; Keyboard; Synthesiser
- Years active: 2017–present
- Labels: Armada; Rave Culture; Armind; Black Hole
- Members: Assaf Tuvia, born 11 September 1988 (age 38); Gal Abutbul, born 13 February 1988 (age 38)
- Website: flrntn.com

Florentin (formerly Graham Bell which rebranded in 2021) is an Israeli DJ and record producer duo composed of Assaf Tuvia (Hebrew: אסף טוביה) and Gal Abutbul (גל אבוטבול), from Jerusalem, Israel. They began their career as ghost producers and sound engineers.

Their song "The Sound Of Letting Go (Tribute To Yotam)" alongside SIVAN, was chosen at #386 of A State of Trance TOP 1000 of all time.

== Discography ==
=== Singles as Graham Bell ===
| Title | Year |
|---|---|
| "Raveolution" (with Sandro Silva) | 2020 |
| "Pam Pam (Phat Bass)" | 2020 |
| "The Sound Of Letting Go (Tribute To Yotam)" (with Sivan) | 2020 |
| "Rollercoaster" | 2020 |

=== Remixes as Graham Bell ===
| Title | Year |
|---|---|
| "Hear You Now" (Da Hool) | 2019 |
| "Miles Away" (Armin van Buuren ft. Sam Martin) | 2020 |

=== Singles as Florentin/FLRNTN ===
| Title | Year |
|---|---|
| "Intergalactic"(with W&W) | 2021 |
| "Echoes"(with Armin van Buuren) | 2022 |

=== Remixes as Florentin/FLRNTN ===
| Title | Year |
|---|---|
| "Silver Lining" (Andrew Rayel) | 2021 |
