= Stereosonic =

Australian music festival (2007–2015)

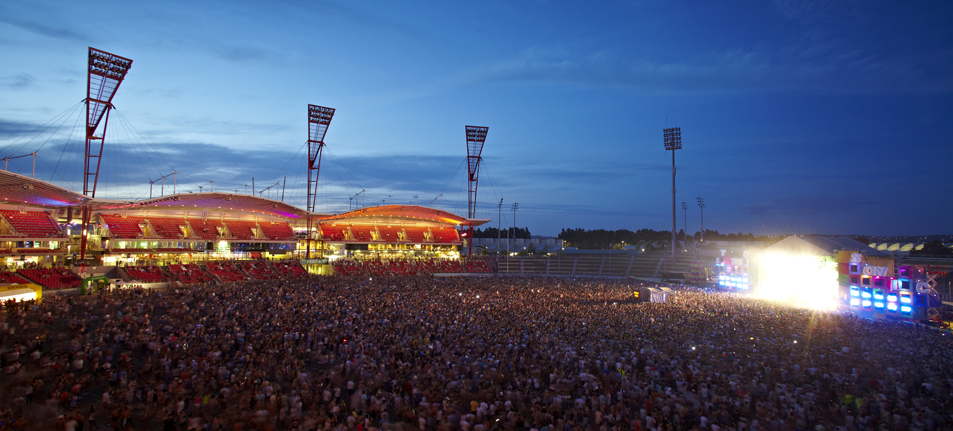
- Stereosonic Sydney, 2010
- Genre: Electronic dance music
- Dates: November, December
- Locations: Brisbane, Adelaide, Perth, Sydney, Melbourne
- Years active: 2008–2015
- Founders: Totem Industries (Richie McNeil, Simon Coyle) & Onelove Music Group (Frank Cotela, Dror Erez, Peter Raff)
- Website: www.stereosonic.com.au

Stereosonic was an annual electronic dance music festival held in Australia in November and early December. Stereosonic was held in Brisbane, Adelaide, Perth, Sydney, and Melbourne, attracting attendances of up to 200,000 patrons nationally featuring the biggest electronic artists in the world.

Stereosonic was a collaboration of two major Australia promoters Totem Industries and Onelove Music Group. In 2010 Totem Industries and Onelove Music Group created Totem Onelove Group, Australia's leading electronic music companies. In 2013 Totem Onelove Group was acquired by U.S. based global electronic music company SFX Entertainment of New York.

As of 2012, it was regarded as Australia's fastest growing music festival. In 2016 however, the event was cancelled with the promise that it would return "bigger and better". The festival did not return in 2017, and no announcements have been made regarding its revival for 2018 or beyond.

Onelove Music Group announced new event – Festival X. It was planned for 2018, but did not happen: "Due to unforeseen last-minute changes in artist availability, the partners involved in Festival X have agreed not to proceed with the 2018 event. We set out to deliver the very best experience and the compromises to the proposed line-up did not meet the vision that we have for FestivalX. More news will follow on our future plans for FestivalX – stay tuned to the website and Facebook page for more information". No event was planned in 2019.

== History ==
2007: Totem Industries and Onelove Music Group started Stereosonic music festival in Melbourne.

2008: Stereosonic expands and is held in Melbourne, Brisbane, Perth and Adelaide.

2009: Stereosonic was held as a truly national event across (Sydney, Melbourne, Brisbane, Perth and Adelaide).

2010: Totem Industries and Onelove Music officially form the joint company “Totem Onelove Group”. Tiesto headlined Stereosonic for his first Australian festival appearance since 2003.

2011: The Sydney Stereosonic event was held with the incorporation of ANZ Stadium as the main arena, attracting a crowd of 70,000 people. The Sydney event is the largest single day festival attendance ever in Australia.

2012: Stereosonic attracts over 200,000 patrons across five Australian capital cities. The festival is awarded the most popular festival in Australia at the inthemix awards.

Totem Onelove partners with AIDs charity, (RED) for the first ever live stream of Stereosonic in an effort to raise awareness of the fight against AIDs.

2013: Totem Onelove Group purchased by SFX Entertainment.

Stereosonic, Australia's premier electronic music festival, expands from a one-day festival to a two-day festival across five Australian capital cities. David Guetta, Calvin Harris and Armin van Buuren lead a lineup of over 350 artists.

Totem Onelove supports leading world AIDS charity for DANCE (RED) SAVE LIVES 2 by supporting the live YouTube stream of Stereosonic Sydney.

== Patronage ==
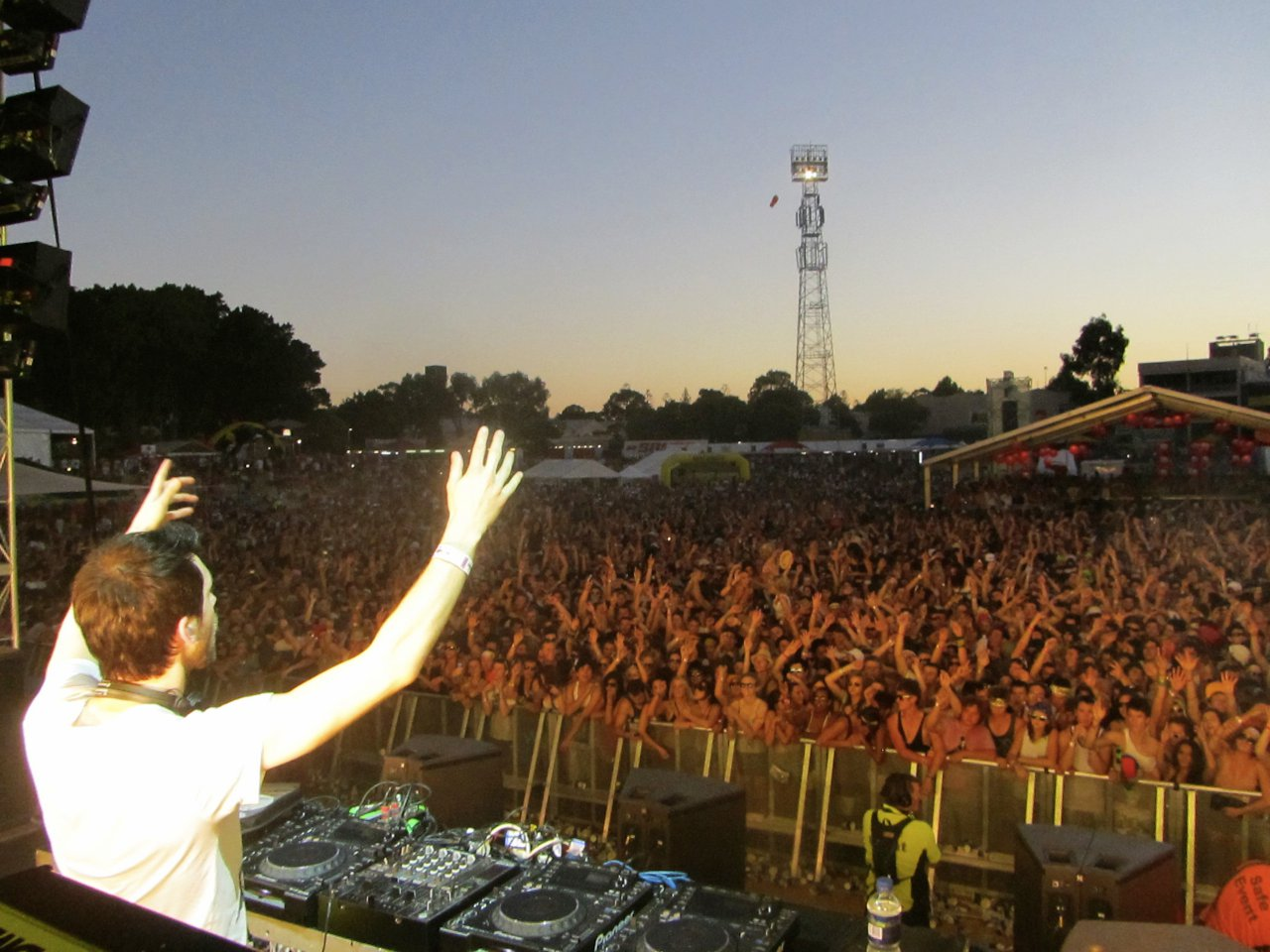
Calvin Harris in Perth, 2010

External videos
- Calvin Harris – Stereosonic Sydney 2012
- deadmau5 2009

The festival promoters originally began working in Melbourne nightclubs forming the company Totem OneLove, which was in turn purchased by SFX Entertainment in 2013.

The 2009 event was the first to see all five cities host.

The 2011 Stereosonic Sydney was the largest festival ever held in Australia. 60,000 people were in attendance with more than 50 people charged for drug possession offences. The Public Order and Riot Squad were called in after patrons attacked police who were trying to break up fights and to assist with other crowd management issues. That year Stereosonic also sold out in Melbourne and Adelaide.

The 2012 Perth event attracted almost 31,000 people. The 2012 Melbourne event was attended by around 45,000 people. That event saw the arrest of 92 festival-goers on drugs charges. In 2013, Stereosonic expanded to a two-day festival format across all five cities, enabling more than 50 international artists and over 300 local emerging Australian acts to perform. This was the first time an Australian festival, held on such a large scale across five cities, had been held on multi-days in densely populated cities. Calvin Harris, David Guetta and Armin van Buuren headlined the event, with the Sydney event streamed online to raise awareness for leading AIDS charity, (RED) on World AIDS Day.

The 2015 Sydney event attracted a crowd of over 48,000, with 69 people being charged for drug supply and possession.

== Incidents ==
A 25-year-old woman became ill at the 2015 Sydney festival and died in hospital from a drug overdose. A man was arrested on 4 December for supplying the woman with drugs. Also in 2015, a 19-year-old man died at the Adelaide Stereosonic event.

== Lineups ==
=== 2007 ===
- Fedde Le Grand
- Booka Shade
- Trentemoller
- DJ Mehdi
- Tim Deluxe
- Kevin Saunderson
- Stacey Pullen
- Paul Harris
- Vicarious Bliss
- Steve Rachmad
- Martijn Ten Velden
- Klaas
- Alex (Chicks on Speed)
- Meat Katie
- The Potbelleez
- John Course
- Grant Smilie
- Ajax
- Acid Jacks
- Kaz James

=== 2008 ===
- Sneaky Sound System
- Paul van Dyk
- Carl Cox
- PNAU
- Midnight Juggernauts
- Booka Shade
- Infected Mushroom
- DJ Hell
- Crookers
- Kaz James
- TV Rock
- Vitalic
- Japanese Popstars
- DJ Funk (ed banger)
- Tommie Sunshine
- Headman
- Don Diablo
- Mowgli
- Giuseppe Ottaviani
- Stu Stone
- Sam La More
- Dave Nada
- Devlin and Darko (BBC/Spank Rock DJs)
- Mr Maqs (ed banger)
- Ajax

=== 2009 ===
- Deadmau5
- Axwell
- Fedde Le Grand
- John Dahlbäck
- Crookers
- Surkin
- The Bloody Beetroots feat MC Justin Pearson
- Miss Kittin & The Hacker
- Marco Carola
- Chicane
- Cut Copy DJs
- Dragonette
- Drop the Lime
- Renaissance Man
- Alter Ego
- Zombie Nation
- Umek
- Hudson Mohawke
- Tim Sweeney (DFA)
- The Cobra Snake
- Kidda
- Juan Kidd
- Grant Smillie
- Andy Murphy
- Acid Jacks
- Grafton Primary
- Canyons
- Knightlife
- Bag Raiders

=== 2010 ===
- Tiesto
- Calvin Harris
- Robyn (Cancelled)
- Major Lazer
- Sebastian Ingrosso
- Benny Benassi
- Wiley
- Ricardo Villalobos
- Infected Mushroom
- Jeff Mills
- Afrojack
- Luciano
- DJ Sneak
- Annie Mac
- Caspa and MC Rod Azlan
- Giuseppe Ottaviani (GO! Live)
- Reboot
- DJ T
- Optimo
- DJ Dan
- Congorock
- Sied van Riel
- Technasia
- Russ Chimes
- Redshape
- L-VIS 1990
- Aly and Fila
- Butters & Jaydee

=== 2011 ===
- Armin Van Buuren
- Carl Cox
- LMFAO
- Empire of the Sun
- Afrojack
- The Bloody Beetroots
- Avicii
- Benny Benassi
- Ferry Corsten
- Dirty South
- Kaskade
- Dash Berlin
- Sub Focus live
- Andy C
- Mr Oizo
- Chris C (Aus)
- PNAU
- Pretty Lights
- Annie Mac
- Crookers
- BT Live
- Caspa
- MC Dynamite
- Claude VonStroke
- Datsik
- Lucy Love
- Bag Raiders
- Zombie Nation LED Show
- Drop the Lime Band
- The 2 Bears (Joe Hot Chip and Raf Daddy)
- Guy Gerber
- The Gaslamp Killer
- Deetron
- EDX
- Jochen Miller
- Arty
- Yousef
- Madeon
- Dream
- Peter Van Hoesen
- Myon & Shane 54
- Destructo
- Acid Jack Live
- Jon Rundell
- MC Stretch
- ShockOne
- Beni (musician)

=== 2012 ===
- Tiesto
- Avicii
- Calvin Harris
- Example (musician)
- Carl Cox
- Major Lazer
- Laidback Luke
- Martin Solveig
- Dash Berlin
- Markus Schulz
- Diplo
- Sander Van Doorn
- Infected Mushroom
- Chuckie
- Flux Pavilion
- Mr Oizo
- Porter Robinson
- Chris C (Aus)
- Loco Dice
- Bassnectar
- JFK MSTRKRFT
- Excision (musician)
- Adam Beyer
- Aly and Fila
- Caspa
- Datsik
- Joris Voorn
- Bingo Players
- Tommy Trash
- Simon Patterson
- Gesaffelstein
- Orjan Nilsen
- Dillon Francis
- Foreign Beggars
- Zedd
- Brodinski
- Krewella
- Nina Kraviz
- Van She
- Alvin Risk
- Destructo
- MaRLo
- Club Cheval
- Treasure Fingers
- French Fries
- Beni (musician)
- Duke Dumont
- Mickey
- Kaz James
- Feenixpawl
- Acid Jack

=== 2013 ===
Headline acts for the 2013 festivals include David Guetta, Calvin Harris, Armin Van Buuren.

- Above & Beyond
- Acid Jacks
- Afrojack
- Alesso
- Aly & Fila B2B John O'Callaghan
- Andrew Rayel
- Andy C
- Axwell
- Bingo Players
- Boys Noize
- Breach
- Bryan Kearney
- Burns
- Cajmere
- Claude VonStroke
- Clockwork
- Destructo
- DJ Falcon
- DJedjotronic
- Doctor P
- Dog Blood
- Drumsound & Bassline Smith
- Empire of the Sun
- Ferry Corsten
- Feenixpawl
- Flight Facilities
- Fritz Kalkbrenner
- Gareth Emery
- Generik
- Giuseppe Ottaviani
- Heatbeat
- Hot Natured
- Hot Since 82
- Infinity Ink
- Jamie Jones
- Jochen Miller
- Justin Martin
- Kaz James
- Chris C (Aus)
- Krewella
- Labrinth
- Late Nite Tuff Guy
- Lee Foss
- Lemaitre
- M4sonic
- Maceo Plex
- MarLo
- Mat Zo
- Matrix & Futurebound
- Nero
- Nick Thayer
- Nicky Romero
- Noisia & Foreign Beggars Presents I Am Legion
- RL Grime
- Robert Delong
- Sebastian Ingrosso
- Shock:One
- Showtek
- Solarstone
- Solomun
- Stafford Brothers
- Sunnery James Ryan Marciano
- The Bloody Beetroots
- TJR
- Tommie Sunshine
- Tommy Trash
- UZ
- What So Not
- W&W
- Will Sparks
- Zedd

2013 Arenas

- Full on Ferry
- Hot Creations
- HARD
- UKF

=== 2014 ===
- Calvin Harris
- Tiësto
- Diplo
- Disclosure (DJ Set)
- W&W
- DJ Snake
- Duke Dumont
- Will Sparks
- RL Grime
- Peking Duk
- NERVO
- Cedric Gervais
- Cosmic Gate
- Andrew Rayel
- Tale Of Us
- Destructo
- Ørjan Nilsen
- Nina Kraviz
- Oliver Heldens
- Wilkinson
- Scuba
- Cash Cash
- Kölsch
- MaRLo
- Mano Le Tough
- Shogun
- Uberjak'd
- Mark Sixma
- Slumberjack
- Nina Las Vegas
- Timmy Trumpet
- M4SONIC
- Tigerlily
- Generik
- Carmada (L D R U & Yahtzel)
- Skrillex
- Alesso
- Steve Aoki
- Showtek
- Dash Berlin
- Carl Cox
- Porter Robinson (Live)
- Laidback Luke
- New World Punx
- TJR
- Ferry Corsten
- Noisia
- Deorro
- Headhunterz
- MK
- DVBBS
- Booka Shade (Live)
- Markus Schulz
- What So Not
- Joel Fletcher
- John O'Callaghan
- Foreign Beggars
- Hot Since 82
- Alison Wonderland
- Crookers
- Jack Beats
- The Aston Shuffle
- Route 94
- Simon Patterson
- Alex Metric
- Deetron
- Kaz James
- Ilan Bluestone
- Acid Jacks
- Nick Thayer
- ZHU

=== 2015 ===
Stereosonic 2015 reverted to a 1-day event unlike the 2013 and 2014 events which were run over 2 days.

- Armin van Buuren
- Major Lazer
- Axwell Λ Ingrosso
- Showtek
- Oliver Heldens
- Galantis
- Diplo
- DJ Snake
- Duke Dumont
- Will Sparks
- Peking Duk
- Mashd N Kutcher
- Tchami
- Generik
- What So Not
- Carnage
- Carmada
- Jauz
- Slumberjack
- Clean Bandit (live)
- Gareth Emery
- Andrew Rayel
- MaRLo
- Andrew Bayer
- Emma Hewitt
- Headhunterz
- Mark Sherry
- Jason Ross
- Exis
- Dan Burke
- MK
- Claptone (immortal – live)
- Claude VonStroke
- Hannah Wants
- Patrick Topping
- Shiba San
- Cut Snake
- Hot Dub Time Machine
- Timmy Trumpet
- SHOCKONE
- Snails
- Jessie Andrews
- Tigerlily
- Glover
- Yolanda Be Cool
- JDG
- Joel Fletcher
- Samuel James
- Kyro
- Andy Murphy
- Brynny
- Scndl
- Who Killed Mickey
- Matt Watkins

== Awards ==
inthemix Annual Awards

2014

- Winner Best Major Festival

2013

- Winner Best Major Festival (First year Inthemix has awarded nationally instead of state by state)

2012

- Winner Favourite Festival – New South Wales
- Winner Favourite Festival – South Australia
- Winner Favourite Festival – Victoria
- Runner-up Favourite Festival – Western Australia
- Runner-up Favourite Festival – Queensland

2011

- Winner Favourite Festival – Victoria
- Winner Favourite Festival – South Australia
- Winner Favourite Festival – Western Australia
- Runner-up Favourite Festival – New South Wales
- Runner-up Favourite Festival – Queensland

2010

- Winner Favourite Festival – Victoria
- Winner Favourite Festival – Western Australia
- Runner-up Favourite Festival – South Australia
- Runner-up Favourite Festival – Queensland

== See also ==
- List of electronic music festivals
- Creamfields Australia
