= Langenboom =

- Village
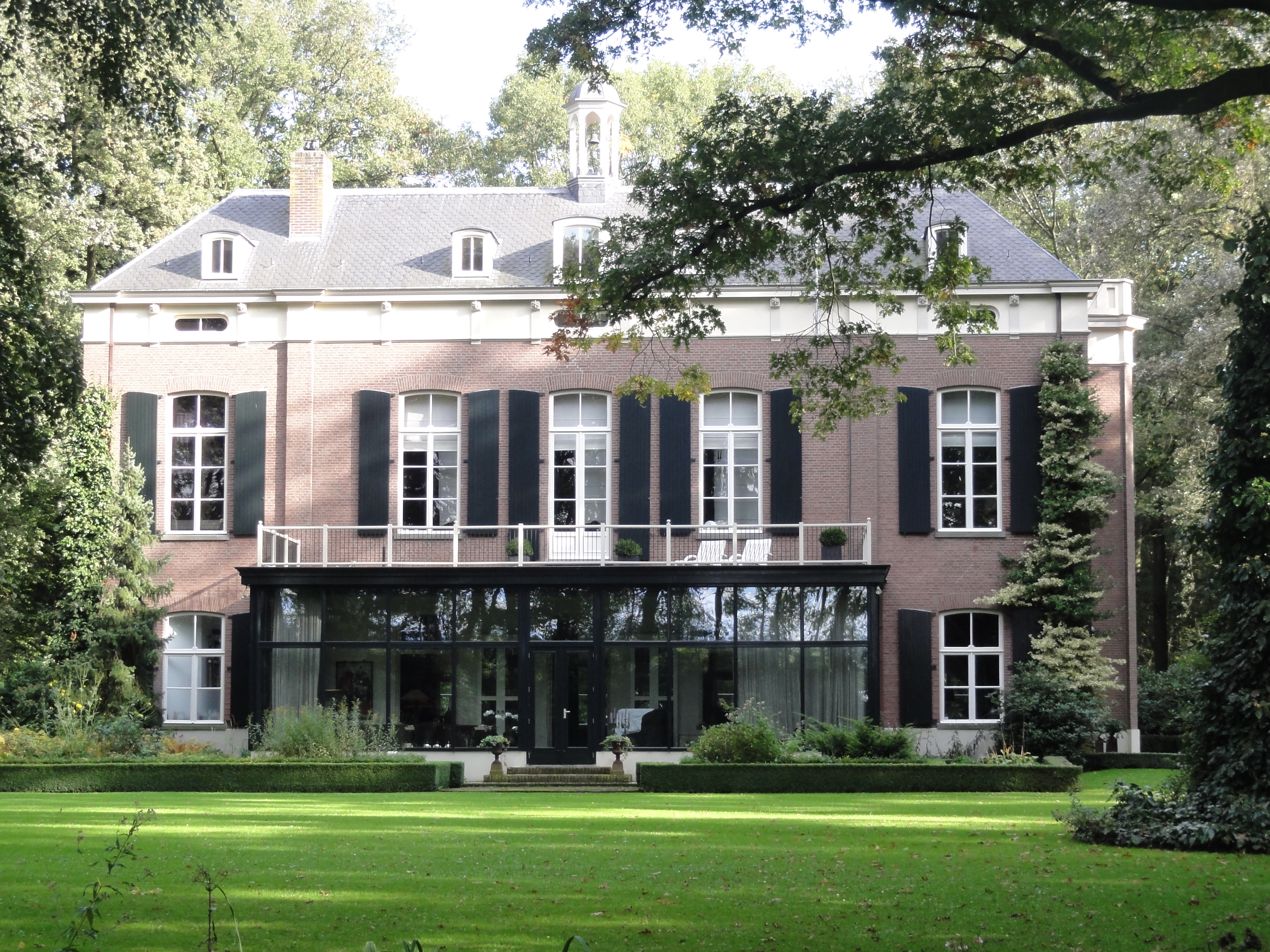
- Russendaal estate

- Flag

- Location in the province of North Brabant in the Netherlands Langenboom (Netherlands)
- Coordinates: 51.7018°N 5.7323°E
- Country: Netherlands
- Province: North Brabant
- Municipality: Land van Cuijk

Area
  - Total: 13.37 km^{2} (5.16 sq mi)
- Elevation: 19 m (62 ft)

Population (2021)
  - Total: 2,265
  - Density: 169.4/km^{2} (438.8/sq mi)
- Time zone: UTC+1 (CET)
  - Summer (DST): UTC+2 (CEST)
- Postal code: 5453
- Dialing code: 0486

Langenboom is a village in the Dutch province of North Brabant. It is part of the municipality of Land van Cuijk. Langenboom is located in the Peel region, and lies about 18 kilometres (11 mi) south-west of Nijmegen.

== History ==
The village was first mentioned in 1794 as Langenboom, and means "long boom barrier". It is likely referring to a barrier on the road to Zeeland which was used to provide cattle access to the pastures.

For most of its history, it was a hamlet and peat excavation settlement. Langenboom was home to 67 people in 1840. In 1858, a novice centre and study hall of the Dominican Order was established in Langenboom. A monastery was built between 1867 and 1874, and designed by Pierre Cuypers. The Dominican congregation later moved to Huissen, however a village developed around the monastery.

In 1925, a cyclone devastated the village. The cyclone is usually referred to as the Tornado of Borculo, because it killed four people and did not leave a single building undamaged in Borculo. In Langenboom 21 houses, the monastery, the church and the school were destroyed. In 1926, the Holy Family Church was built in cubic and expressionist style. The church was designed by Eduard Cuypers.

On 10 May 1940, Germany invaded the Netherlands. The German army initially tried to enter by armoured train, however steel bars and mines were placed on the track which caused the train to derail. The Dutch soldiers put up a defensive line near Langenboom with 12 canons from 1880 which initially held back the invasion force. Around 18:00, the village was bombed by Stukas which destroyed the defensive line and about 20 houses.

In 1944, after Operation Market Garden, General Miles Dempsey set up his headquarters in a farm in Langenboom. The farm has been renamed Koningshoeve (King's farm), because it was visited by King George VI on 15 October 1944. It was assumed that Dempsey was knighted at the farm, however photographic evidence suggests that the knighting probably took place at Eindhoven Airport.

== Notable people ==
- Jochen Miller (born 1979), trance musician and progressive house DJ

== Gallery ==
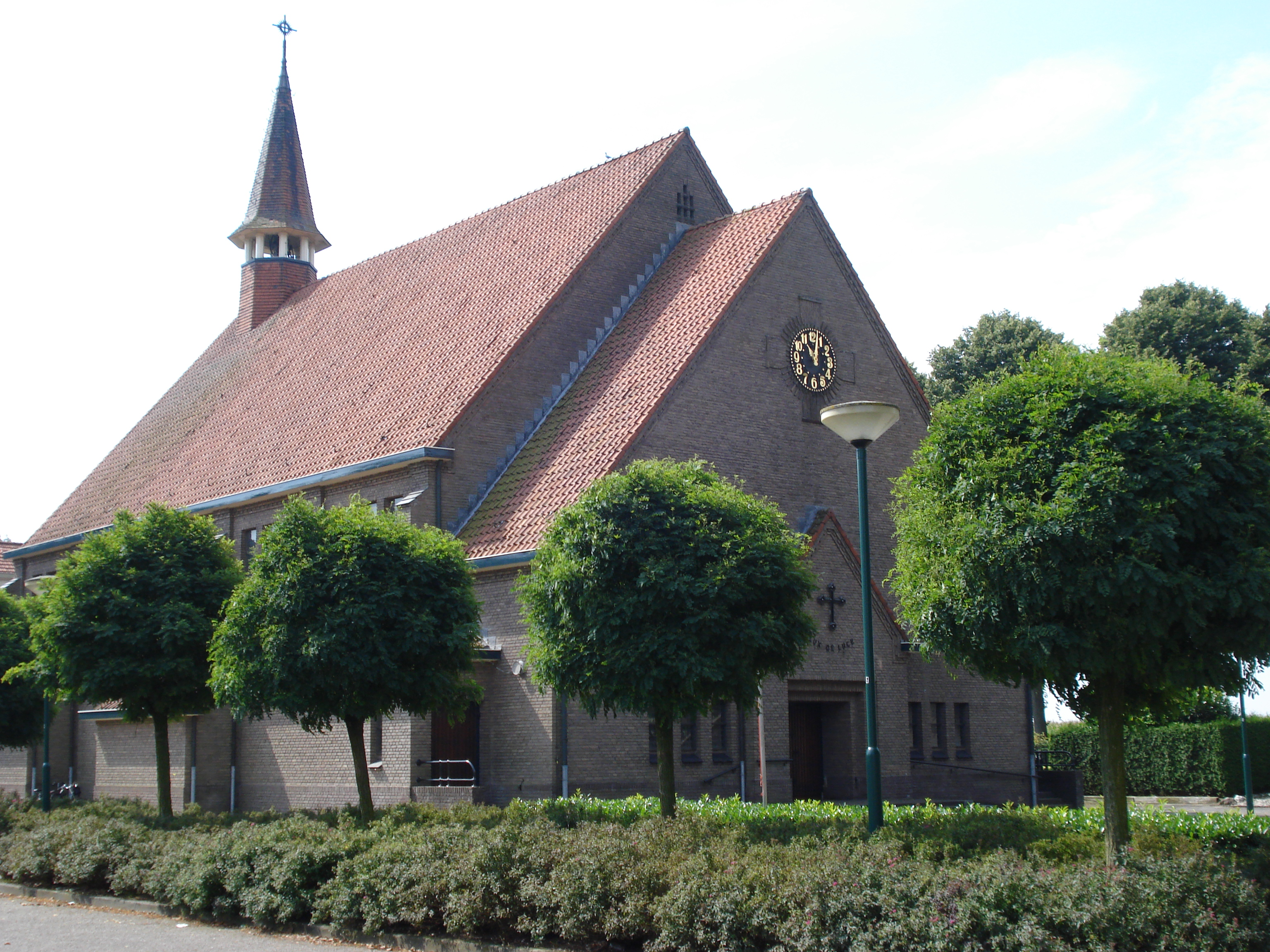
Holy Family Church

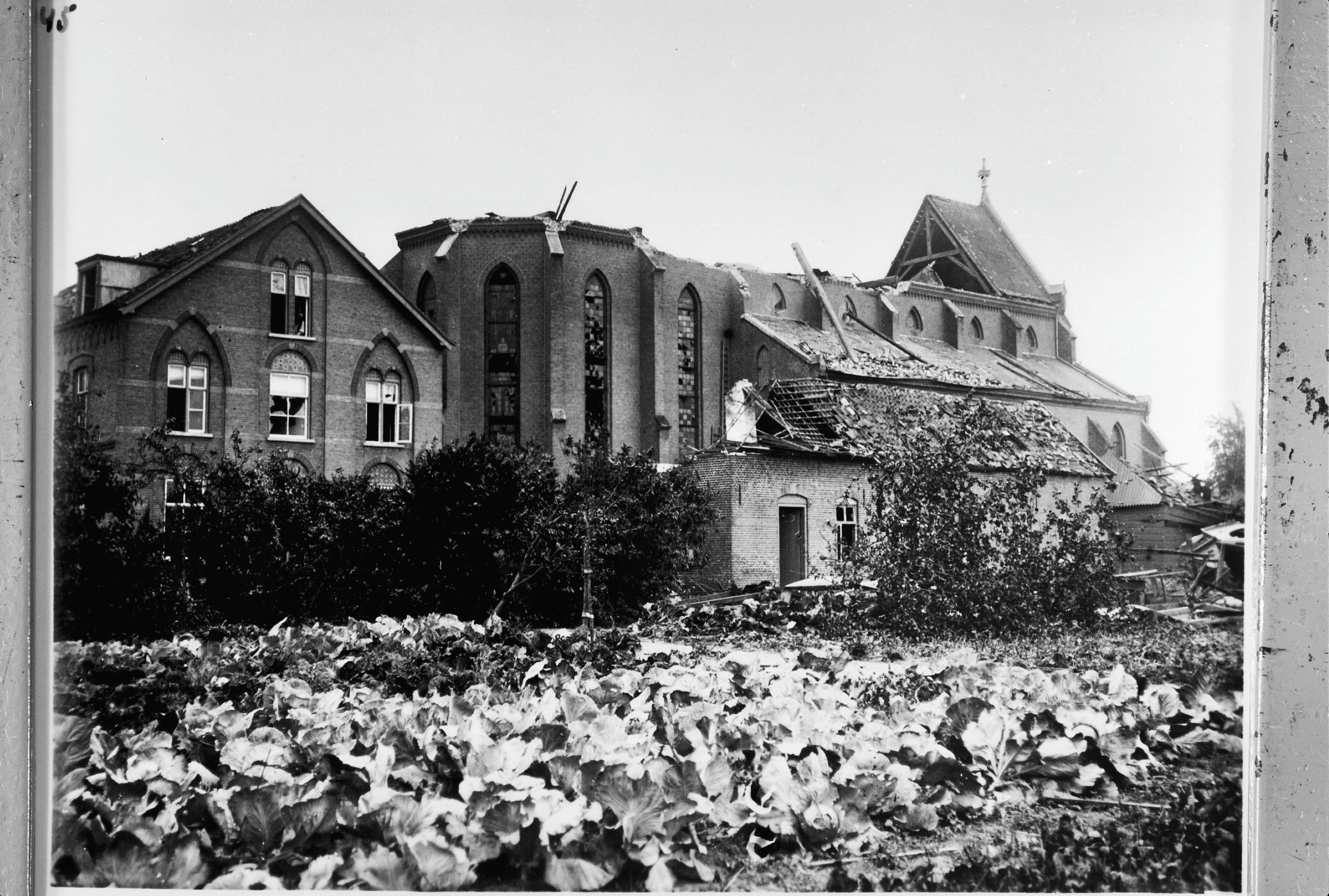
Tornado damage (1925)

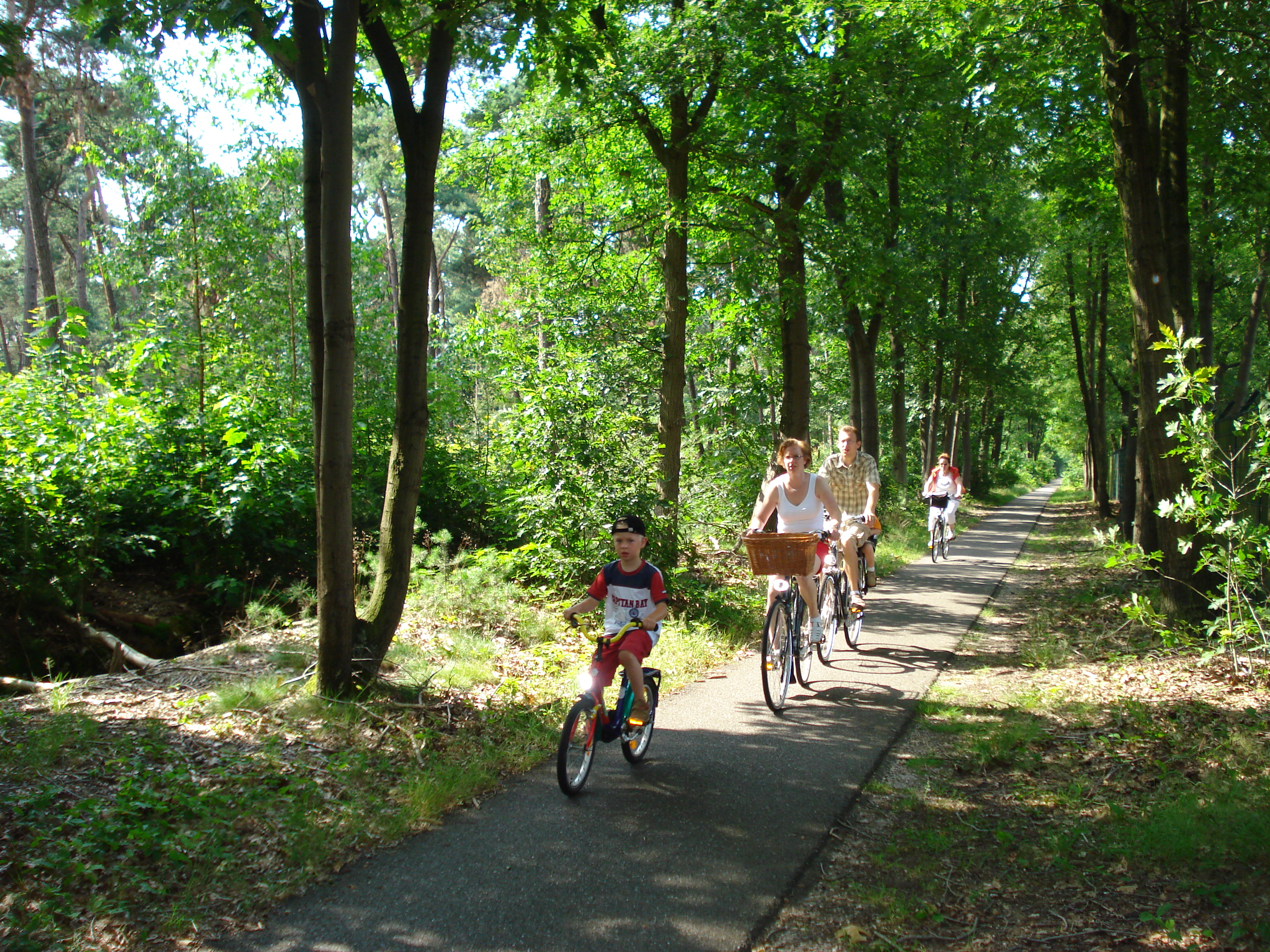
Forest near Langenboom

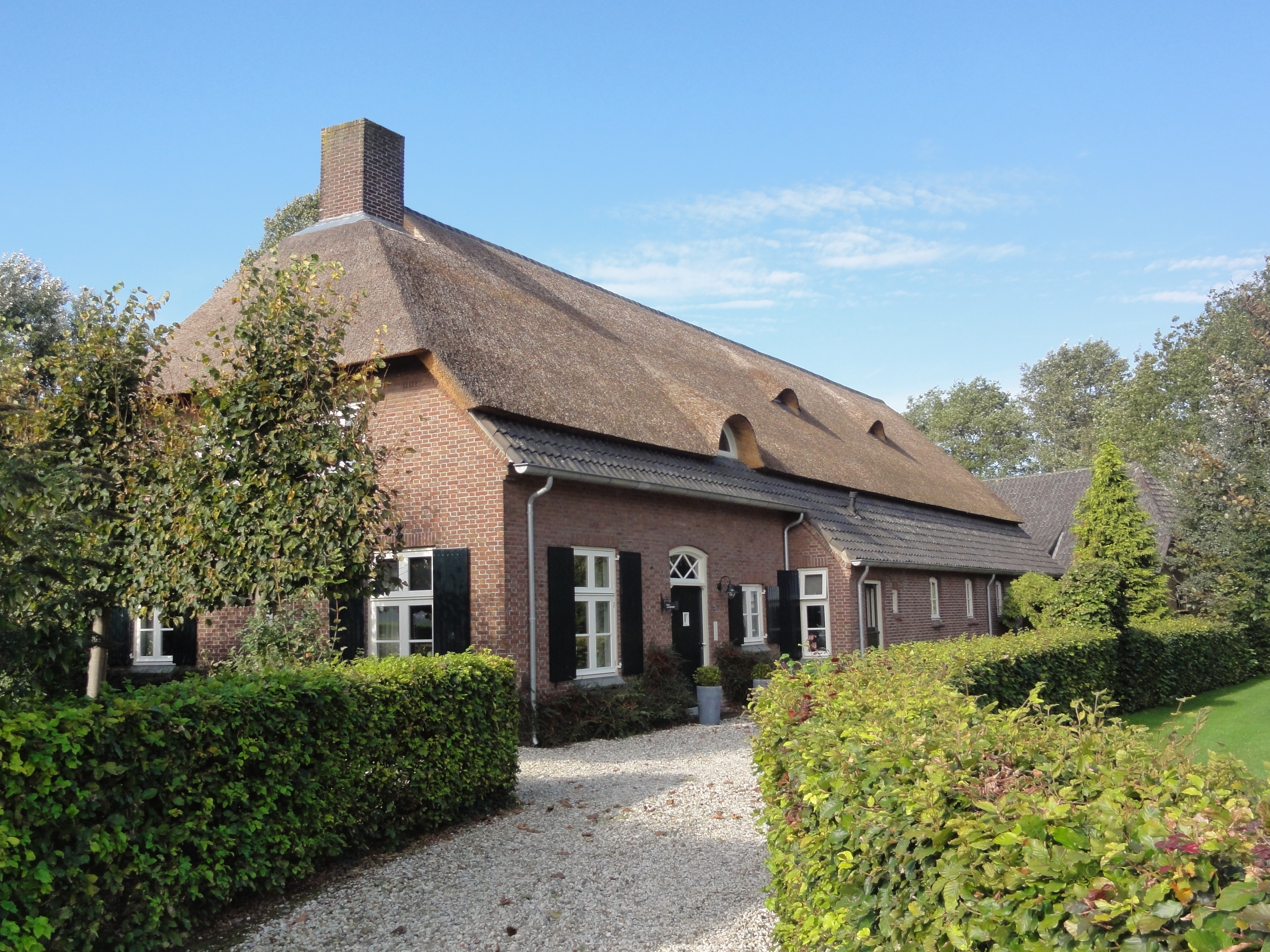
Farm in Langenboom
