= Hystereo =

Single by Armin van Buuren

from the album A State of Trance Ibiza 2014 at Ushuaïa
- Released: 5 September 2014
- Recorded: Armada Studios, Amsterdam
- Genre: Uplifting trance
- Length: 2:40 (Radio Edit); 5:05 (Original Mix)
- Label: Armind; Armada
- Songwriter(s): Armin van Buuren; Benno de Goeij
- Producer(s): Armin van Buuren; Benno de Goeij

Armin van Buuren singles chronology
"Ping Pong" (2014)	"Hystereo" (2014)	"Another You" (2015)

"Hystereo" is an instrumental composition by Dutch disc jockey and record producer Armin van Buuren. The track was released in the Netherlands by Armind as a digital download on 5 September 2014 as the only single from van Buuren's compilation A State of Trance Ibiza 2014 at Ushuaïa.

== Music video ==
A music video to accompany the release of "Hystereo" was first released onto YouTube on 8 October 2014.

== Track listings ==
- Netherlands digital download (ARMD1193)
1. "Hystereo" (Original Mix) – 5:05
- Netherlands digital download (ARMD1193A)
1. "Hystereo" (Radio Edit) – 2:40
2. "Hystereo" (Original Mix) – 5:05
- Netherlands CD single (AMNP042)
1. "Hystereo" (Radio Edit) – 2:40
- Netherlands digital download - "The Remixes" (ARMD1200)
1. "Hystereo" (Heatbeat Remix) – 5:14
2. "Hystereo" (KhoMha Remix) – 5:37
3. "Hystereo" (Thomas Vink Remix) - 7:03
- France digital download
1. "Hystereo" (Radio Edit) – 2:42
2. "Hystereo" (Heatbeat Radio Edit) – 2:45
3. "Hystereo" (KhoMha Radio Edit) – 3:00
4. "Hystereo" (Thomas Vink Radio Edit) – 3:38
5. "Hystereo" (Original Mix) – 5:05
6. "Hystereo" (Heatbeat Remix) – 5:15
7. "Hystereo" (KhoMha Remix) – 5:38
8. "Hystereo" (Thomas Vink Remix) – 7:04
9. "Hystereo" (Intro Mix) - 6:56
- Netherlands digital download Wach Remix (WAO138030)
1. "Hystereo" (Wach Remix) – 6:01
- Netherlands digital download Wach Remix (WAO138030A)
1. "Hystereo" (Wach Radio Edit) – 2:25
2. "Hystereo" (Wach Remix) – 6:01

== Charts ==
Chart (2014)	Peak position
Netherlands (Dutch Dance Top 30)	22
