= Jwaydan Moyine =

British musical artist

- Born: Jwaydan; Berkshire, England
- Genres: Electronic dance music
- Occupations: Singer, composer, pianist
- Years active: 2011–present
- Website: jwaydanofficial

Jwaydan Moyine is a classically trained singer, pianist and composer of British, Middle Eastern, Circassian, and East European descent.

== Education ==
Moyine was born and raised in the United Kingdom. She began to sing and play the piano at an early age and studied at the Guildhall School of Music and Drama, graduating as a classical composer, pianist, and cellist. Although initially a pianist and cellist, she gravitated toward classical composition and production and trained to become a composer of Film music. She cites her parents' inclination towards classical music as a pivotal inspiration in her development as a musician. Her musical influences include composers such as Mozart, Tchaikovsky as well as Enya.

== Career ==
Jwaydan garnered attention when she collaborated with Aly & Fila to release the song "We Control the Sunlight". It was eventually released on Armin van Buuren's compilation album A State of Trance 2011 and went onto worldwide acclaim, reaching 10 million listeners on YouTube, over 8 million Spotify streams, and 80 million radio plays worldwide. Her second release was "Untouchable". She wrote a second song with Aly & Fila called "Coming Home", which was released on A State of Trance 2012, garnering three million views on YouTube. In 2013 she released "Until The End" with Moldovan artist Andrew Rayel.

In 2010, she opened for artists such as Tiësto and John Digweed. In 2011 she was invited to perform at Armin Van Buuren's ASOT 550 Den Bosch. In 2014, she left her record label and management to pursue a career away from the electronic dance music scene, and returned to more acoustic-sounding music. Outside of EDM, she has worked as a songwriter with producers whose involvement include artists such as Jessie J, Pixie Lott, Plan B, Demi Lovato, JoJo and Chipmunk.

== Discography ==
- "We Control The Sunlight" (2011)
- "Untouchable" (2011)
- "Xantic" (2011)
- "Standing Our Ground: Song for the Egyptian Revolution" (2011)
- "Coming Home" (2012)
- "Until The End" (2013)
