= Find Your Harmony =

Studio album by Andrew Rayel
- Released: May 30, 2014
- Genres: Trance, electronic dance music
- Label: Armada Music
- Producer: Andrew Rayel

Andrew Rayel chronology
| Find Your Harmony (2014) | Moments (2017) |

Singles from Find Your Harmony
- 1. "How Do I Know" Released: October 29, 2012; 2. "Sacramentum" Released: June 10, 2013; 3. "Until the End" Released: September 16, 2013; 4. "Dark Warrior" Released: December 2, 2013; 5. "EIFORYA" Released: March 17, 2014; 6. "Goodbye" Released: May 2, 2014; 7. "One In A Million" Released: August 4, 2014; 8. "Miracles" Released: February 23, 2015; 9. "We Bring the Love" Released: April 17, 2015; 10. "Daylight" Released: May 18, 2015; 11. "Rise of the Era" Released: December 4, 2015

Find Your Harmony is the first studio album by Moldovan trance producer and DJ Andrew Rayel. It was released on May 30, 2014.

== Track listing ==
| No. | Title | Artist | Length |
|---|---|---|---|
| 1. | "Find Your Harmony (Intro)" | Andrew Rayel | 3:34 |
| 2. | "Dark Warrior" | Andrew Rayel | 4:54 |
| 3. | "Impulse" | Andrew Rayel | 5:04 |
| 4. | "Hold On to Your Love" | Andrew Rayel feat. Cindy Alma | 4:40 |
| 5. | "Miracles" | Andrew Rayel feat. Christian Burns | 5:11 |
| 6. | "Latifa" | Andrew Rayel | 5:29 |
| 7. | "EIFORYA" | Andrew Rayel & Armin van Buuren | 5:00 |
| 8. | "Followed By Light" | Andrew Rayel | 4:37 |
| 9. | "How Do I Know" | Andrew Rayel feat. Jano | 5:15 |
| 10. | "Rise of the Era" | Andrew Rayel | 4:58 |
| 11. | "Until the End" | Andrew Rayel feat. Jwaydan | 5:00 |
| 12. | "One in a Million" | Andrew Rayel feat. Jonathan Mendelsohn | 4:07 |
| 13. | "Fading Echoes" | Andrew Rayel & Lira Yin | 4:00 |
| 14. | "Sacramentum" | Andrew Rayel with Bobina | 5:20 |
| 15. | "Power of Elements" | Andrew Rayel | 5:45 |
| 16. | "Goodbye" | Andrew Rayel feat. Alexandra Badoi | 4:54 |
| 17. | "There Are No Words" | Andrew Rayel feat. Sylvia Tosun | 3:38 |
| 18. | "The End at Pianoland (Outro)" | Andrew Rayel | 4:07 |
| Total length: | | | 85:53 |
