= Festival X =

Music festival in Australia

- Genre: Electronic dance music
- Date: Late November to early December
- Frequency: 2019 + 2022
- Locations: Melbourne, Brisbane, Sydney, Australia
- Years active: 4 Years (2019 - 2022)
- Inaugurated: 2019
- Most recent: 2022
- Attendance: 100,000 (2019)
- Website: www.festivalx.com.au

Festival X was an electronic dance music festival held in Australia in November and early December. Festival X was held in Brisbane, Sydney, and Melbourne, featuring international and local electronic artists.

Festival X was a collaboration between Hardware and Onelove Music Group who operated Stereosonic and partnered with Live Nation that promote Splendour in the Grass and Falls Festival.

== History ==
In 2018, Onelove Music Group announced a new event to supersede Stereosonic, however the event was ultimately cancelled as the organisers stated "Due to unforeseen last-minute changes in artist availability, the partners involved in Festival X have agreed not to proceed with the 2018 event. We set out to deliver the very best experience and the compromises to the proposed line-up did not meet the vision that we have for FestivalX. More news will follow on our future plans for FestivalX – stay tuned to the website and Facebook page for more information".

In July 2019, Festival X announced the inaugural event would take place in November and December 2019. The first edition was attended by 100,000 in Melbourne, Brisbane and Sydney. A smaller scale one day event called Festival X Rising was held in New Zealand on 28 November 2019. Calvin Harris headlined alongside Juice WRLD, Lil Pump, Tchami and Anna Lunoe.

Festival X announced in September 2020 the festival would not be returning due to the COVID-19 pandemic, with a return in 2021. There was no festival in 2021, but the return of Festival X was announced for December 2022.

== 2019 Lineup ==
The inaugural event saw performances from Calvin Harris, Armin Van Buuren, Lil Pump, Alison Wonderland, Anna Lunoe, Badrapper, Camelphat, Cosmic Gate, Generik, Marlo, Nic Fanciulli, Steve Aoki, TCHAMI, Trippie Redd and Vini Vici.

== 2022 Lineup ==
The 2022 the even will go to 5 cities Melbourne, Sydney, Gold Coast, Adelaide, and Perth. The event lineup includes Calvin Harris, Megan Thee Stallion who eventually pulled out of the lineup, Don Toliver.
