= Marlo Hoogstraten =

Dutch DJ (born 1980)

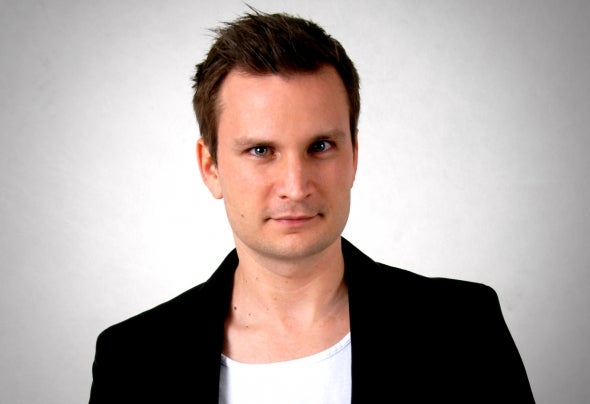

Background information
- Born: Marlo Hoogstraten; Amsterdam, Netherlands
- Genre: Trance
- Occupations: Musician; DJ; producer
- Label: Armada Music

Marlo Hoogstraten (Dutch pronunciation: [ˈmɑrloː ˈɦoːxstraːtə(n)]), also known by his stage name MaRLo, is a Dutch-born Australian trance DJ. In 2010, he was voted Australia's Number 2 Trance DJ and overall Number 11 in the Inthemix Top 50 DJ poll. He started his career using hardware synthesizers (Roland JP-8000, Nord Lead, Korg Wavestation, Novation Supernova) and nowadays produces almost exclusively on his computer.

== Biography ==
Hoogstraten is known as MaRLo in the music industry (with the mid-name capitalisation due to his repeated introduction as 'Mario' by radio DJs). Born in Amsterdam the Netherlands, he currently resides in Australia. He has his own label, Reaching Altitude, with signed artists including Heatbeat and Mark Sixma. MaRLo is married to Jano, a trance singer who has collaborated with Armin van Buuren and Andrew Rayel.

== Discography ==
=== Extended plays ===
Title	Details
Abandoned / Abyss	Released: 11 January 2019; Label: Reaching Altitude; Format: Digital download

=== Singles and remixes ===
2022

1. MaRLo and Sunset Bros. featuring Sydnee Carter - War Eyes (Reaching Altitude, Armada Music)

2021

1. MaRLo - Hoogenbanger (Self-released)
2. MaRLo and Frontliner - Hook (Sinphony)
3. MaRLo - Venom (Reaching Altitude, Armada Music)
4. Haliene - Walk Through Walls (MaRLo Remix) (Black Hole Recordings)
5. Quench - Dreams (MaRLo Remix) (Vicious Black)

2020

1. MaRLo and Haliene - Say Hello (Reaching Altitude, Armada Music)
2. MaRLo, Triode and Haliene - Castles in the Sky (Central Station Records)
3. Will Sparks and MaRLo - Feel It (Rave Culture)
4. MaRLo and Jantine - For You (Reaching Altitude, Armada Music)
5. Armin van Buuren and MaRLo featuring Mila Josef - This I Vow (Armada Music)

2019

1. MaRLo - The Power Within (Altitude 2019 Anthem) (Reaching Altitude, Armada Music)
2. Pete Delete - Wild Child (MaRLo Edit) (Reaching Altitude, Armada Music)
3. MaRLo and Matrick - Blast Off (Reaching Altitude, Armada Music)
4. MaRLo and Feenixpawl - Lighter Than Air (Armind)
5. MaRLo and Haliene - Whisper (Reaching Altitude, Armada Music)

2018

1. What So Not featuring Winona Oak - Beautiful (MaRLo Remix) (Counter Records)
2. MaRLo featuring Emma Chatt - Here We Are (Armind)
3. MaRLo with Avao - We Are The Future (Reaching Altitude, Armada Music)
4. Sunset Bros and Mark McCabe - I'm Feeling It (In The Air) (MaRLo Remix) (Universal Music Operations)
5. MaRLo with Roxanne Emery - A Thousand Seas (Reaching Altitude, Armada Music)
6. Jean Clemence - Roots (MaRLo Edit) (Reaching Altitude, Armada Music)
7. MaRLo - Enough Echo (Reaching Altitude, Armada Music)

2017

1. MaRLo - The Launch (Reaching Altitude, Armada Music)
2. MaRLo - Onaj (A State of Trance, Armada Music)
3. Bobby Neon and Nick Arbor featuring Lokka Vox - What You Said (MaRLo Remix) (Genesis Recordings)
4. MaRLo with First State - Falling Down (Armind, Armada Music)\
5. Armin van Buuren - I Live For That Energy (MaRLo Remix) (Armada Music)

2016

1. MaRLo featuring Emma Chatt – Leave My Hand (Armind, Armada Music)
2. MaRLo – Join Us Now (Who's Afraid of 138?!, Armada Music)
3. MaRLo and Chloe – You And Me (Armind, Armada Music)
4. Orjan Nilsen – Between The Rays (MaRLo Remix)
5. Ferry Corsten – Beautiful (MaRLo Remix)
6. MaRLo – Titans (A State Of Trance, Armada Music)
7. MaRLo – Darkside

2015

1. MaRLo featuring Jano – The Dreamers (A State of Trance, Armada Music)
2. MaRLo – Atlantis (A State of Trance, Armada Music)
3. MaRLo – Ignite (A State of Trance, Armada Music)
4. Marcel Woods – Advanced (MaRLo Remix) [High Contrast Recordings]
5. MaRLo featuring Christina Novelli – Hold It Together (Armind, Armada Music)
6. Dash Berlin - Shelter (feat. Roxanne Emery) [MaRLo Remix] (Armada Music)
7. MaRLo – Strength (Armind, Armada Music)

2014

1. MaRLo vs Fisherman & Hawkins – Forces (A State of Trance, Armada Music)
2. MaRLo featuring Jano – Haunted (A State of Trance, Armada Music)
3. MaRLo – Barracuda (A State of Trance, Armada Music)
4. MaRLo – Poseidon (A State of Trance, Armada Music)

2013

1. MaRLo – The Future (Armada Captivating, Armada Music)
2. MaRLo – Visions ( A State of Trance, Armada Music)
3. MaRLo and Sarah Swagger — Always Be Around ( A State of Trance, Armada Music)
4. MaRLo – Boom (A State of Trance, Armada Music)

2012

1. MaRLo - Lightning (A State Of Trance, Armada Music)
2. MaRLo — Dreams (A State Of Trance, Armada Music)
3. Rex Mundi – Opera of Northern Ocean (MaRLo Remix) [Armada Music]
4. Paul Webster featuring Angelic Amanda – Time (MaRLo Remix, Armada Music]
5. Solarstone – Pure (MaRLo Remix) [Black Hole Recordings]
6. MaRLo – Showgrounds (A State of Trance, Armada Music)
7. MaRLo – Silverback (A State of Trance, Armada Music)
8. MaRLo – Underneath (A State of Trance, Armada Music)
9. MaRLo – Megalodon (A State of Trance, Armada Music)
10. MaRLo – Evolution (A State of Trance, Armada Music)
11. MaRLo – Freedive (A State of Trance, Armada Music)
12. Angger Dimas and Polina – Release Me (MaRLo Remix) [Vicious]

2011

1. Gaia – Stellar (MaRLo Remix) [Armind (Armada)]
2. MaRLo featuring Jano – Just Breathe [Spinnin Records]
3. MaRLo featuring Jano – The Island [Spinnin Records]
4. MaRLo – Forward Thinking/Semtex [RESET/Spinnin Records]
5. Ferry Corsten – Punk (MaRLo Remix) [FLASHOVER]
6. Sied van Riel – MME (MaRLo Remix) [Spinnin Records]
7. W&W – Impact (MaRLo Remix) [Armada Music]

2010

1. MaRLo – Magnetic [Spinnin Records]
2. MaRLo – Superlift [Spinnin Records]
3. MaRLo – Not Alone [Spinnin Records]
4. MaRLo – Capture [NOYS Music]
5. Alex Kunnari and Heikki L – Brand New Day (MaRLo Remix) [Black Hole Recordings]
6. Rory Gallagher – Dark Side of the Sun (MaRLo Remix) [Armada Music]
7. Jude Eliott – Twilight (MaRLo Remix) [Central Station Records]

2009

1. MaRLo – Ula [Armada]
2. MaRLo featuring Kristen Marlo – Is It Real [NOYS Music]
3. MaRLo – Alpha [Pangea]
4. Ohmna featuring Nurlaila – Key of Life (MaRLo Remix) [Armada Music]
5. Ferry Corsten – Brainbox (MaRLo Remix) [Flashover Recordings]
6. Rozza – Ones We Love (MaRLo remix) [Neuroscience]
7. Arcane Science featuring Rhys Oris – Should Have Told Me (MaRLo Remix) [NOYS Music]

== Live performances ==
- Ministry of Sound Trance Nation CD, 14 date tour around Australia 2010
- Trance Energy – The Netherlands
- Trance Energy Australia
- ASOT 550 – The Netherlands
- Uitmarkt Festival – The Netherlands
- GO-Parc – Germany
- Paradiso – Indonesia
- Home Club – Singapore
- World DJ Festival 2013 – Seoul, Korea
- Sky Garden – Indonesia
- Cirque du Soleil – Belgium
- Sensation
- Creamfields
- Godskitchen
- Slinky
- Gatecrasher
- Stereosonic
- Cream
- Transmission
- A State of Trance 700 2015 - Sydney, Australia and Utrecht, The Netherlands, Miami Ultra Music Festival
- A State of Trance 750 2016 - Utrecht, The Netherlands, Miami Ultra Music Festival
- Atlantis 2015, Melbourne and Sydney, Australia
- Atlantis 2016, Melbourne and Sydney, Australia
- Djakarta Warehouse Project 10th Edition (DWPX) 2018, Bali, Indonesia
- Altitude 2019, Melbourne, Sydney, Brisbane and Perth, Australia
- Luminosity Beach Festival 2024, The Netherlands

== External link ==
- Official website
