= Tom Staar =

English DJ (born 1982)

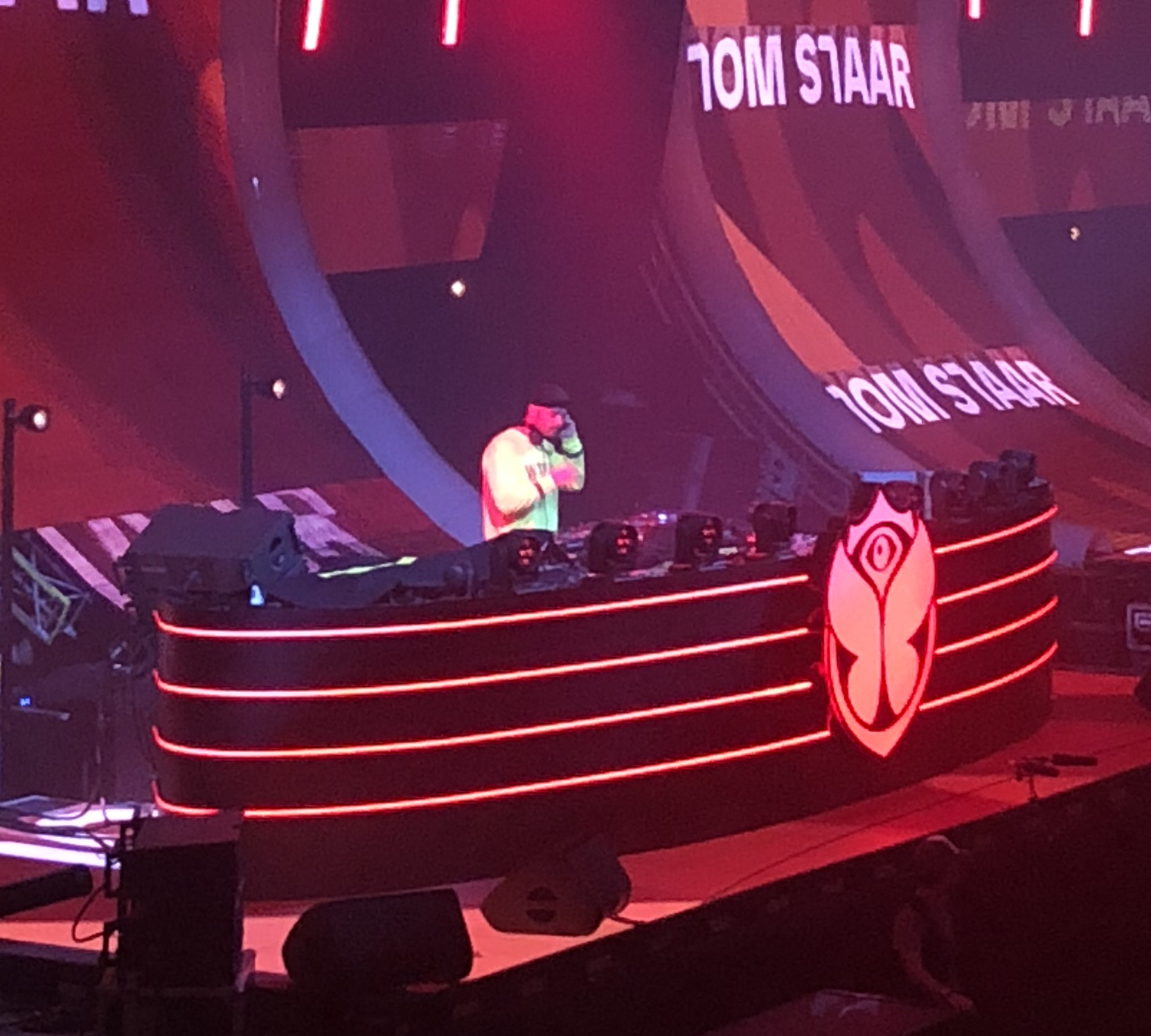
- Staar performing at Tomorrowland in 2018

Background information
- Born: Thomas Ingamells; 23 October 1981 (age 44); London, England
- Genres: House; electro house; progressive house; UK hard house
- Occupations: Musician; DJ; record producer
- Instruments: Piano; guitar; synthesizer
- Years active: 2009–present
- Labels: Staar Traxx, Spinnin', Size, Axtone, Armada, Wall, Cartel, Mau5trap, Tidy Trax

Thomas Ingamells (born 23 October 1981), better known by his stage name Tom Staar, is an English DJ and record producer.

== Biography ==
Many of his singles remain for several consecutive weeks in the top 100 on downloading platform Beatport, including "Totem", "Jericho", or "Wide Awake" and "Bora". These four singles, with the remix of "Apocalypse" (with Kryder), are his four largest performances.

== Discography ==
=== Charting singles ===
Year	Title	Peak chart positions												Album
Year	Title	AUS	AUT	BEL (Vl)	BEL (Wa)	FIN	FRA	GER	IRL	NLD	SWE	SWI	UK	Album
2013	"Staars" (featuring In Atlanta)	–	–	15^{[A]}	—	—	—	—	—	—	—	—	—	Non-album singles
"—" denotes a recording that did not chart or was not released in that territory.

=== Singles ===
- 2012: "Home" (We Are Friends Vol. 1) [Mau5trap]
- 2012: "Cheyenne" [Kindergarten Recordings]
- 2012: "Evil Lurks" (with Wolfgang Gartner) [Ultra]
- 2012: "Kingdom" [Mixmash Records]
- 2013: "After Dark" (with Style of Eye) [Wall Recordings]
- 2013: "Trident" [Staar Traxx]
- 2013: "Staars" (featuring In Atlanta) [Spinnin' Records]
- 2013: "Faces" (with Chrom3) [Kindergarten Records]
- 2014: "Rocket" [Toolroom Records/Armada Trice]
- 2014: "Matterhorn" (with Kaz James) [Staar Traxx]
- 2014: "Totem" (with Ansolo) [Size Records]
- 2014: "Jericho"' (with Kryder) [Size Records]
- 2015: "Wide Awake" (with Still Young) [Spinnin' Records]
- 2015: "Bora" [Axtone Records]
- 2015: "Higher" [Sprs]
- 2015: "De Puta Madre" (with Kryder and The Wulf) [Sprs]
- 2015: "Kraken" (with Knife Party) [Earstorm / Big Beat Records]
- 2016: "Empire" (with Dimitri Vangelis & Wyman) [Buce Records]
- 2016: "The Funkatron" (with Robbie Rivera) [Axtone Records]
- 2016: "Disappear" (with New_ID) [Sprs]
- 2016: "Me Sueño" (featuring Martina Carmago) [Cartel Recordings]
- 2017: "Railgun" (with Daddy's Groove) [Doorn Records]
- 2017: "Sunshine" (with Rob & Jack) [Staar Traxx / Armada Deep]
- 2017: "Bird Flu" (with Corey James) [Cartel Recordings]
- 2017: "Drift" [Size Records]
- 2017: "Nighttrain" [Musical Freedom]
- 2018: "Come Together" (with Matt Hope) [Axtone Records]
- 2018: "Flight of the Buzzard" [Armada Music]
- 2018: "Otherside" (with Eddie Thoneick) [Axtone Records]
- 2018: "Bombs Away" (with Sunnery James & Ryan Marciano) [Size Records]
- 2019: "This Ain't Techno" (with David Guetta) [Spinnin' Records]
- 2019: "Easy Soul" (with Trace) [Spinnin' Records]
- 2020: "Body Back" (with Jack Back) [Toolroom Productions]
- 2020: "Still Better Off" (with Armin van Buuren featuring Mosimann) [Armind]
- 2020: "Waiting on My Love" (with Kryder featuring Ebson) [Axtone]
- 2020: "In My Soul" (with Avira featuring Diana Mino) [Armada Music]
- 2020: "U & I" (featuring Leo Stannard) [Armada Music]
- 2021: "Playing Games" (with Cedric Gervais) [Armada Music]
- 2021: "Glow" (with Ferry Corsten featuring Darla Jade) [Armada Music]
- 2021: "Let Go" (with Armin van Buuren featuring Josha Daniel) [A State Of Trance]
- 2021: "Not Over Yet" [Armada Music]
- 2021: "Flames" (with Eddie Thoneick featuring Abel Simpson) [Armada Music]

=== Remixes ===
- 2011: Example - "Changed the Way You Kiss Me" (Tom Staar Remix) [Ministry of Sound]
- 2011: Marina and the Diamonds – "Radioactive" (Tom Staar Remix) [679 Recordings]
- 2012: My Digital Enemy and Rob Marmot – "African Drop" (Tom Staar Remix) [Wall Recordings]
- 2012: Afrojack and Shermanology – "Can't Stop Me" (Kryder and Staar Remix) [Wall Recordings]
- 2013: Tommy Trash – "Monkey See Monkey Do" (Tom Staar Remix) [mau5trap]
- 2013: Francesco Rossi – "Paper Aeroplane" (Tom Staar Remix) [d:vision]
- 2013: Dirty South featuring Joe Gil – "Until the End" (Tom Staar Mix) [Phazing]
- 2013: Dave Spoon – "At Night" (Tom Staar Remix) [Toolroom Records]
- 2014: Arno Cost and Norman Doray – "Apocalypse 2014" (Kryder and Tom Staar Remix) [Spinnin Records]
- 2014: Armin van Buuren – "Ping Pong" (Kryder and Tom Staar Remix) [Armind (Armada)]
- 2014: Galantis – "You" (Tom Staar Remix) [Big Beat Records]
- 2014: Dansson and Marlon Hoffstadt – "Shake That" (Tom Staar Remix) [Ffrr]
- 2015: Above & Beyond featuring Alex Vargas – "All Over the World" (Tom Staar's 5 am Black Remix) [Anjunabeats]
- 2015: Sam Feldt – "Show Me Love" (Kryder and Tom Staar Remix) [Spinnin Remixes]
- 2015: Will K – "Here Comes the Sun" (Tom Staar Remix) [Armada Trice]
- 2015: Dimitri Vegas & Like Mike vs Ummet Ozcan – "The Hum" (Kryder and Tom Staar Remix) [Smash the House]
- 2016: Federico Scavo – "Que Pasa" (Tom Staar Remix) [d:vision]
- 2018: Thomas Gold - "Begin Again" (Tom Staar Remix) [Armada Music]
- 2018: David Guetta featuring Anne-Marie - "Don't Leave Me Alone" (Tom Staar Remix) [What a Music]
- 2018: Basement Jaxx - "Bingo Bango" (Tom Staar and Kryder Remix) [XL Recordings]
- 2018: The Chainsmokers featuring Kelsea Ballerini - "This Feeling" (Tom Staar Remix)
- 2018: David Guetta and Black Coffee featuring Delilah Montagu - "Drive" (Tom Staar Remix) [Ultra Records]
- 2018: Cedric Gervais - "Do It Tonight" (Tom Staar Remix) [Delecta Records]
- 2019: Oliver Heldens featuring Shungduzo - "Fire in My Soul" (Tom Staar Remix) [RCA Records]
- 2019: Cliq featuring Caitlyn Scarlett, Kida Kudz and Double S - "Dance on the Table" (Tom Staar Remix) [Sony Music]
- 2019: David Guetta and Martin Solveig - "Thing for You" (Tom Staar Remix)
- 2020: Klubbheads - "Kickin' Hard" (Tom Staar Remix)
- 2020: Ferry Corsten - "Punk" (Tom Staar Remix)
- 2020: Luciana - "Watching You Watching Me" (Tom Staar Remix)
- 2020: Jurgen Vries - "The Theme" (Tom Staar Remix)
- 2020: Solarstone - "Seven Cities" (Tom Staar Remix)
- 2020: Tom Staar featuring Leo Stannard - "U + I" (Tom Staar's Bliss Mix)
- 2021: Armin van Buuren featuring Duncan Laurence - "Feel Something" (Tom Staar Remix)
- 2023: Robbie Rivera - Run (Tom Staar Remix)
- 2023: AndThen - Salsa - (Tom Staar Remix) [Adesso Music]

== Staar Traxx ==
In 2013, Staar started his own imprint entitled Staar Traxx.

Year	Artist	Name	Catalog Number
2017	Tom Staar, Rob & Jack	Sunshine	ST017
2017	Simon Alex & ak9	Badlands	ST016
2016	Rob & Jack	Do My Thing	ST015
2016	Promise Land & Matt Nash	Pressure	ST014
2016	Luca Perra feat. Knifekick	I Want It Now	ST013
2016	Defiev	Friday Night Acid	ST012
2016	Eddie Thoneick	Feel the Soul	ST011
2015	Victor Porfidio & Mark Martins	Zuma	ST010
2015	Stase	Into the Light	ST009
2015	Rob & Jack	Sabale (Tom Staar Edit)	ST008
2015	Jakko	Aminia	ST007
2014	Micha Moor & Avaro	Kwango	ST006
2014	Tom Staar & Kaz James	Matterhorn	ST005
2014	Ansolo & Special Features	Unite	ST003
2014	Tom Staar	From the Staart	ST002
2013	Tom Staar	Trident	ST001
