= Francesco Rossi (composer) =

Italian composer

Francesco Rossi ( ?Bari 1625 – ? after 1699) was an Italian composer, organist and Maestro di Cappella.

== Life ==
Rossi was born in Bari in 1625. He is recorded as student in the Conservatorio di Sant'Onofrio a Porta Capuana in Naples. In 1669 he is Maestro di Cappella in the same institute, position held till 1672, and organist at Bari's Cathedral. He became a canon of Bari Cathedral and on 16 January 1677 was appointed Maestro di cappella. From 1681 he shared the position with his rival Alonzo Ramirez. He moved to Venice in 1686 where he was known as 'abate pugliese'. In Venice he wrote operas for the Teatro San Moisè and published his Salmi et messa a cinque voci op.1 (Venice, 1688). On 22 July 1689 he was appointed maestro di cappella of the Venetian Ospedale dei Mendicanti. He retired on 8 January 1699.

== Compositions ==
=== Operas ===
- La Caduta dell’ultimo Visire (Venice, 1686)
- La Corilda (Venice, 1688)
- La Floridea (Venice, 1688)
- La Pena degli Occhi (Venice, 1688)

=== Sacred works ===
- San Filippo Neri (Oratorio)
- La Caduta degli Angeli (Oratorio)
- Salmi et messa a cinque voci op.1 (Venice, 1688)

== Sources ==
- Jolando Scarpa (ed.): Arte e musica all'Ospedaletto. Schede d'archivio sull'attività musicale degli Ospedali dei Derelitti e dei Mendicanti di Venezia (sec. XVI–XVIII).
- Lorenzo Bianconi & Jennifer Williams Brown: Rossi, Francesco in The New Grove Dictionary of Music and Musicians.
