= Francesco Rossi (DJ) =

Italian DJ & Producer

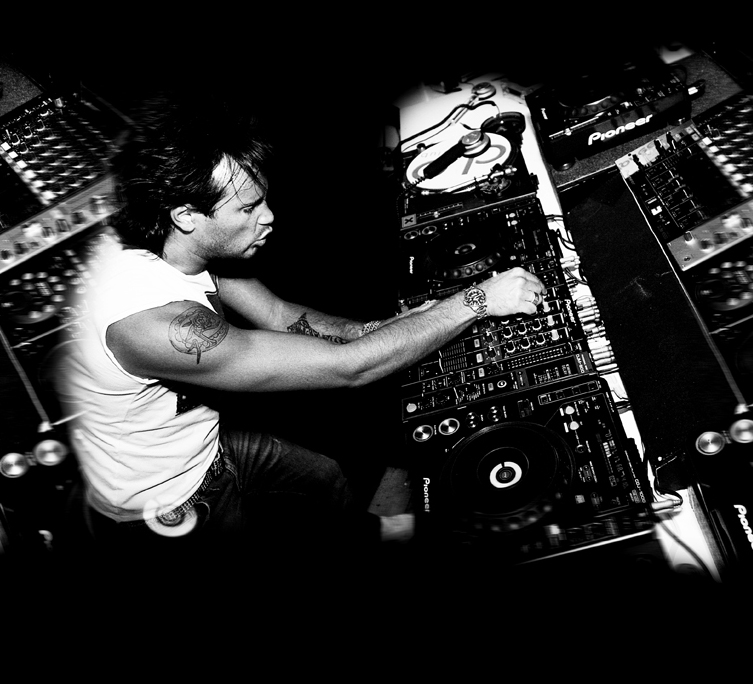
- Francesco Rossi performing

Background information
- Genres: Tech house, deep house
- Occupations: Producer, DJ
- Instrument: Guitar
- Years active: 1990–present
- Labels: d:vision, Strictly Rhythm, Ultra Music, Rouge Purple
- Website: www.frsound.com

Francesco Rossi is an Italian DJ & Producer. His recent success "Paper Aeroplane" (based on Angus & Julia Stone's song) was released on the Italian record label d:vision in May 2013. It was selected as Pete Tong's Essential New Tune and was featured in Maya Jane Coles' BBC Radio 1 Essential Mix. In September 2013, Francesco Rossi won the 2013 special DJ Awards, "Paper Aeroplane" is nominated best Track of the Season during the winners ceremony at Pacha in Ibiza. In January 2014 Francesco was selected as "Future Stars" by Pete Tong during his radio show on BBC Radio 1. In January 2016, his new single "Revolution" coming out inside the new Steve Angello album "Wild Youth".

== Biography ==
Francesco began his career as a DJ in Tuscany. He has performed at festivals including Swiss Street Parade, Sunwaves Festival Romania, Amnesia Ibiza and Ultra Music Festival for four consecutive years (2007-2010).

In 2010 he launched his own record label, Rouge Purple. In 2011 he launched his own radio show, Respect DJs. He has released tracks on record labels d:vision, Defected, Strictly Rhythm and Ultra Music.

In 2026, Rossi's 2013 single "Paper Aeroplane" was included in Amnesia 50th Anniversary: The Sound of 50 Years of Amnesia, a commemorative compilation celebrating the 50th anniversary of the iconic Ibiza nightclub. Released on September 4, 2026, the collection features 50 tracks spanning five decades of electronic dance music, available in a limited-edition 10-vinyl box set and a 5-CD edition.
