= Jochen Miller =

Jochen Miller Jochen van der Steijn
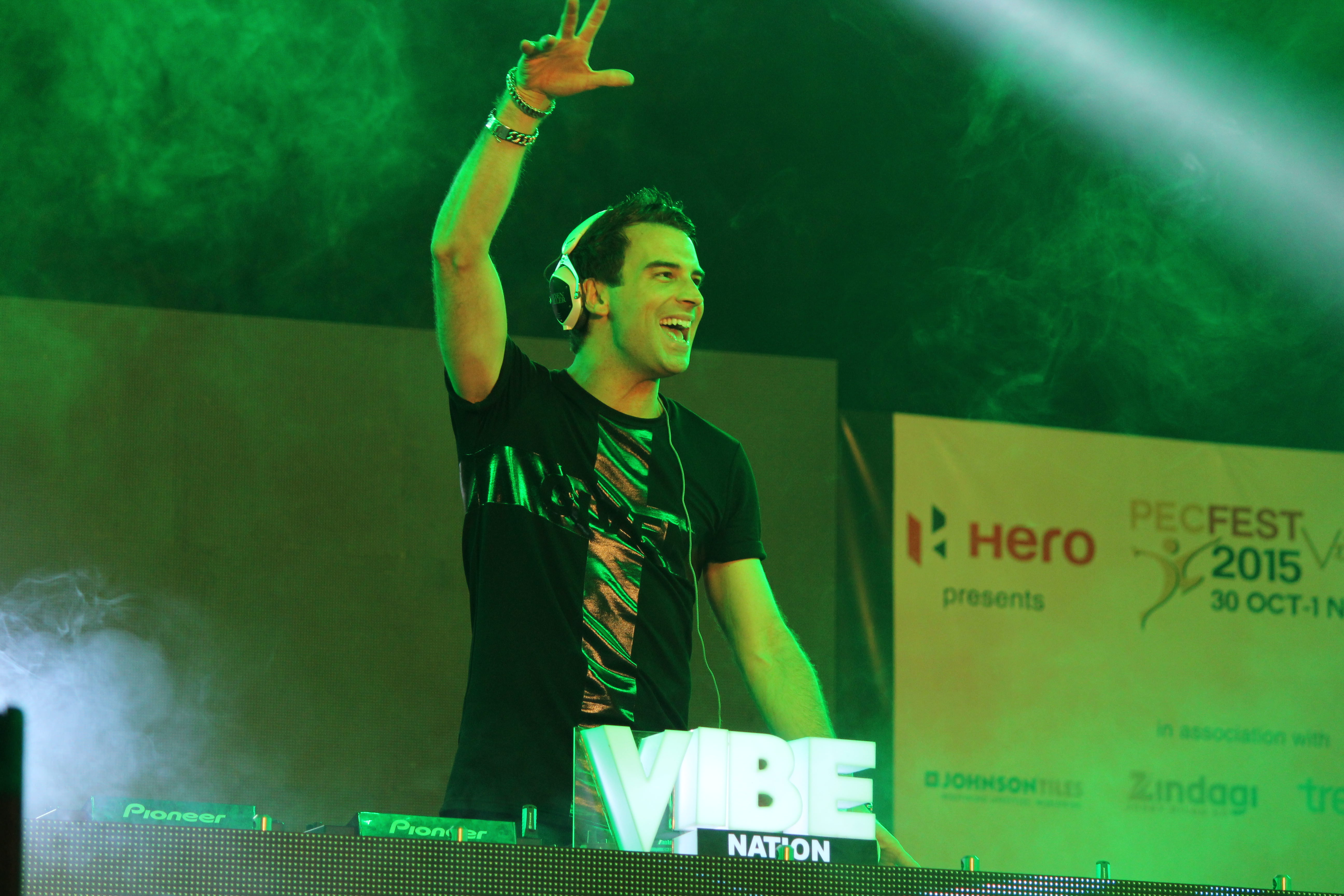

Background information
- Also known as: Jochen Miller, DJ Jochen
- Born: 11 April 1979 (age 47); Langenboom, Grave, Netherlands
- Genres: Trance; progressive house
- Occupations: Musician; DJ; record producer
- Years active: 1999–present
- Labels: Mainstage Music, High Contrast Recordings, Armada
- Website: jochenmiller.com

Jochen van der Steijn (Dutch pronunciation: [ˈjɔxə(ɱ) vɑn dər ˈstɛin]; born 11 April 1979), better known by his stage name Jochen Miller (pronounced [ˈjɔxə ˈmɪlər]), is a Dutch trance musician and progressive house DJ.

== Biography ==
He started his career under the alias "DJ Jochen"; changing to his current name in 2003. He began his career at 16, practicing his mixing skills at a disco owned by his father, where he went on to become a resident DJ. Two years later, at the age of 18, he had a residency at Zino's dance club in Tilburg, NL. In 1999, he won the Dutch Mixing Championships at Dance Valley, where he gained attention for spinning three turntables. In 2001, he became the first resident DJ at The Matrixx club, in Nijmegen, Netherlands. He has since gone on to play at various clubs and events throughout the Netherlands and following burgeoning popularity, globally as well. In 2008, his single "Lost Connection" was featured on Armin van Buuren's popular annual compilation mix album, A State of Trance 2008, thus propelling him to international recognition. In 2010, he signed to David Lewis Productions DJ Agency and in 2011 wrote the song "Rotunda" with Markus Schulz. which was debuted at Armin van Buuren's A State Of Trance 500, which was being held in Buenos Aires at the time.

On 6 February 2012 (on Beatport) he released "Wild and Perfect Day" which was co-produced with Rank 1 and Sarah Bettens.

On 12 September 2016 he released Cephalon on Armada Zouk. 2 days later it was announced via Twitter that he had completed a new song in collaboration with Finnish DJ Tom Fall and American Singer & DJ Tim White. The result of that collaboration was "Sober" which was released on 7 November 2016 on Armada Zouk.

=== Stay Connected radio ===
Jochen Miller also hosts the Radio Show "Stay Connected", in which he plays the latest tracks of the current moment within the scene. The show is only hosted once a month and can be heard as part of Armin van Buuren's "A State of Sundays" Radio Show hosted on SiriusXM's Electric Area. His "Stay Connected" is a duration of 1 hour.

The tracks that brought Jochen to popularity can also be heard just before the radio show starts as they are highlighted. These are tracks such as "Stay connected", "Face Value", "Brace yourself" and lastly "Lost Connection" as mentioned above.

== Discography ==
=== Albums ===
- 2015: Fearless [Armada Music B.V.]

=== Remixes ===
- 2015: A Million Pieces (Remixes)
- 2015: Fearless (Remixes)
- 2016: Disfunktion & Husman feat. Chris Arnott - Everything Is Beautiful (Jochen Miller Remix)
- 2016: Cuebrick & Apek feat. Linney - Safe (Jochen Miller Remix)

=== Releases ===
- 2009: Jochen Miller - Brace Yourself High Contrast Recordings
- 2009: Jochen Miller - Red One High Contrast Recordings
- 2010: Jochen Miller - Humanoid High Contrast Recording
- 2010: Jochen Miller - 3 Days Later High Contrast Recordings
- 2012: W&W & Jochen Miller - Summer Mainstage Music
- 2014: Jochen Miller - Cubic Mainstage Music
- 2014: Paris & Simo vs. Jochen Miller - Flash Armada Trice
- 2014: Jochen Miller and Dmitry Ko - We Back Big & Dirty
- 2014: Jochen Miller featuring Hellen - Let Love Go Armada Trice
- 2014: Jochen Miller - Bad Rule Mainstage Music
- 2015: Jochen Miller featuring Hansen Tomas - A Million Pieces Armada Trice
- 2015: Jochen Miller featuring Chris Hordijk - Fearless Armada Trice
- 2015: Jochen Miller - Turn It Up Armada Trice
- 2015: Jochen Miller featuring Simone Nijssen - Slow Down Armada Trice
- 2015: Jochen Miller and Disfunktion - I Feel Armada Trice
- 2016: Jochen Miller - Viper Armada Trice
- 2016: Jochen Miller and Cuebrick - In The Dark Armada Trice
- 2016: Jochen Miller and Kerano - United Armada Trice
- 2016 Jochen Miller - Scope Armada Trice
- 2016: Jochen Miller - Cephalon Armada Zouk
- 2016: Jochen Miller and Tom Fall feat. Tim White - Sober [Armada Zouk]
- 2016: Jochen Miller and Andrew Rayel feat. Hansen Tomas - Take It All Armind
- 2017: Jochen Miller and Ørjan Nilsen - Renegades Armind
- 2017: Jochen Miller - Time To Go Back High Contrast Recordings
- 2017: Jochen Miller - Brace Yourself (Refurbished Mix) High Contrast Recordings
- 2017: Jochen Miller and JES - Head On High Contrast Recordings
- 2018: Jochen Miller and Cuebrick - With You Maxximize Records
