= Kryder =

English DJ and record producer (born 1980)

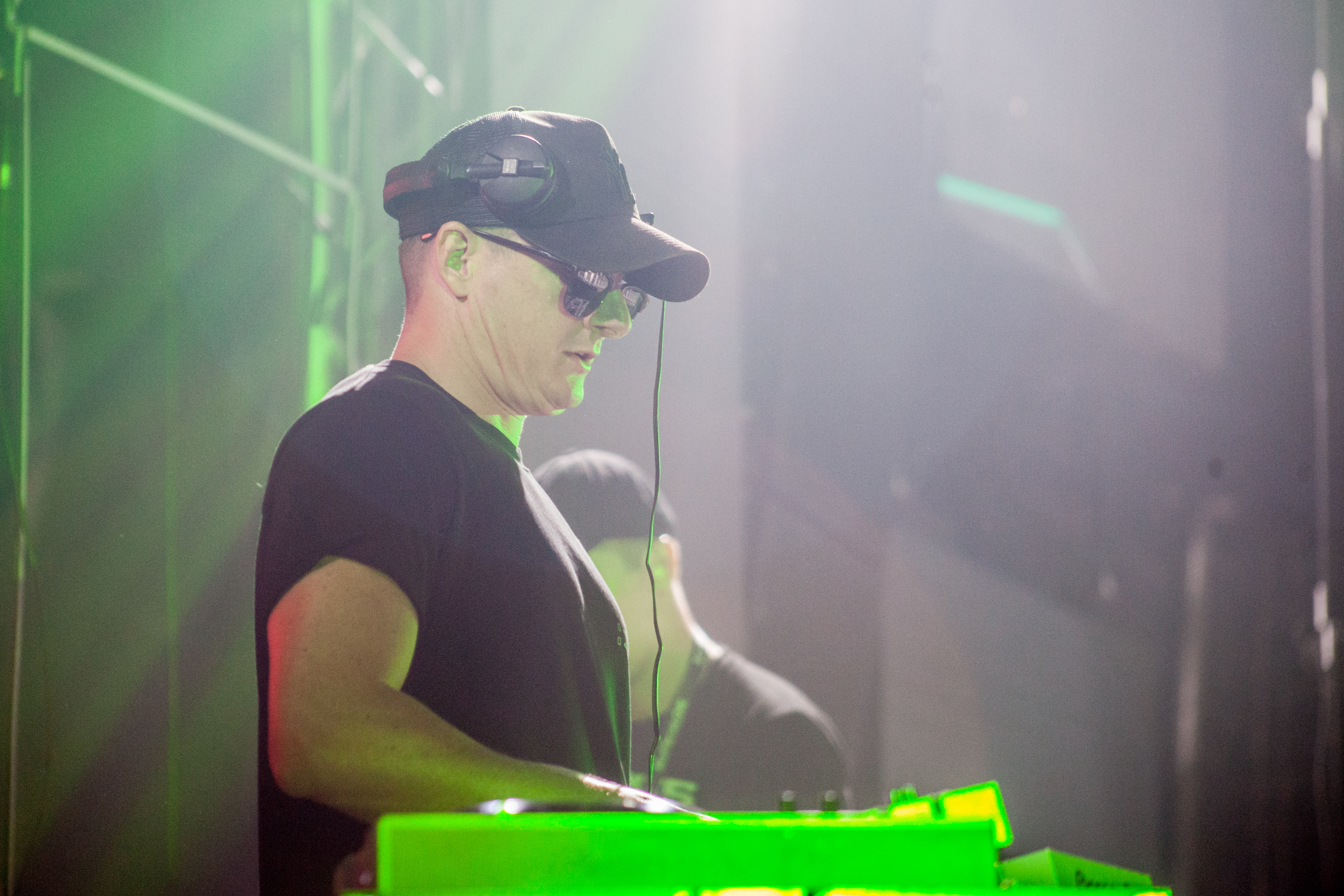
- Kryder performing at festival Beats for Love 2019

Background information
- Born: Christopher Simon Knight; October 28, 1980 (age 45); Hertfordshire, England
- Genres: Electro house; progressive house; tribal house; trance
- Occupations: DJ; record producer
- Years active: 2011–present
- Labels: Kryteria Records; Sosumi Records; Cartel Recordings; Spinnin' Records; Axtone Records; Protocol Recordings; Size Records

Christopher Simon Knight (born October 28, 1980), better known by his stage name Kryder, is an English DJ and record producer.

He is best known for his record "K2" and original track "Aphrodite" released on Axtone Records and his remix of Kölsch's "All That Matters" featuring Troels Abrahamsen both of which reached No. 1 on the Beatport Top 100 chart. He is also the owner of Kryteria Records.

Many of his other singles also experienced great success: "Treasured Soul" and "Jericho" figured many weeks in the top 100.

== Awards and nominations ==
Year	Award	Nominated work	Category	Result
2015	IDMAs	Kryder	Best Progressive House/Electro DJ	Nominee
2015	IDMAs	Kryder	Best breakthrough artist (solo)	Nominee
2015	DJ Mag	Kryder	Top 101–150 DJs	No. 108
2016	IDMAs	Kryder	Best Progressive House/Electro DJ	Nominee
2016	IDMAs	De Puta Madre – Kryder, Tom Staar and The Wulf	Best Latin Dance Track	Won
2016	DJ Mag	Kryder	Top 101–150 Djs	No. 134
2017	1001Tracklists	Kryder	Top 101 Producers	No. 10

== Discography ==
=== Compilation albums ===
List of compilation albums
Title	Album details
God Save the Groove Vol. 1 (Presented by Kryder)	Released: 9 November 2018; Label: Kryteria Records; Formats: Digital download

=== Singles ===
- 2011: Me [Maquina Records]
- 2011: K2 [Musical Freedom]
- 2012: Damaged (feat. Bo Bruce) [House Trained]
- 2012: Sending Out An S.O.S. (with Danny Howard) [Spinnin Records]
- 2012: Ultima [Armada Trice]
- 2012: Scorpio [Armada Trice]
- 2013: Vyper [Cr2 Records]
- 2013: Aphrodite [Axtone Records]
- 2013: Pyrmd [Protocol Recordings]
- 2014: Tarzan [Sosumi Records]
- 2014: Big Momma's House (with Tom Staar) [Sosumi Records]
- 2014: Feels Like Summer (with Still Young and Duane Harden) [Sprs]
- 2014: Fiji [Sprs]
- 2014: Jericho (with Tom Staar) [Size Records]
- 2015: Good Vibes (with The Wulf) [Spinnin Records]
- 2015: Percolator (with Cajmere) [Spinnin Records]
- 2015: Chunk (with Cid) [Free download]
- 2015: Apache (with Dave Winnel) [Size Records]
- 2015: De Puta Madre (with Tom Staar and The Wulf) [Sprs]
- 2016: Crocodile Tears [Axtone Records]
- 2016: Selecta (Chocolate Puma Edit) [Spinnin' Records]
- 2016: The Chant (with Eddie Thoneick) [Cartel Recordings]
- 2016: Dogs On Acid [Sosumi Records]
- 2016: La Luna (with Hiio) [Sprs]
- 2016: You & Me (with The Cube Guys) [Cartel Recordings]
- 2017: Street Life (with Daddy's Groove) [Cartel Recordings]
- 2017: Unity (with Roland Clark) [Sprs]
- 2017: MTV [Musical Freedom]
- 2017: Uh Oh (with Leandro Da Silva) [Kryteria White]
- 2017: Waves (with Erick Morillo) [Subliminal Recordings]
- 2018: Romani (featuring Steve Angello) [Kryteria Records]
- 2018: La Cumbiambera (with Cato Anaya) [Kryteria Records]
- 2018: Billionaire (featuring Sam Martin) [Spinnin' Records]
- 2019: Get Funky (with Fast Eddie) [Musical Freedom]
- 2019: Stay [We Rave You]
- 2019: Drumkore [Kryteria Records]
- 2020: Rusty Trombone [Spinnin' Records]
- 2020: Waiting On My Love (with Tom Staar featuring Ebson) [Axtone]
- 2020: Stay With Me (with Nino Lucarelli) [Spinnin' Records]
- 2020: LSD [Musical Freedom]
- 2021: Pleasure or Pain (with Mark Roma) [Black Hole Recordings]
- 2021: You & I (with Deadline) [Black Hole Recordings]
- 2021: Rapture (with Natalie Shay) [Black Hole Recordings]
- 2021: Girlfriend (with B Jones) [Spinnin' Records]
- 2021: Crashing Down (with Asymptone) [Black Hole Recordings]
- 2021: Piece of Art [Armada Music]
- 2022: Wish [Armada Music]

=== Remixes ===
- 2012: Afrojack and Shermanology – "Can't Stop Me" (Kryder and Staar Remix) [Wall Recordings]
- 2013: Nicky Romero vs. Krewella – "Legacy" (Kryder Remix) [Protocol Recordings]
- 2014: Showtek and Justin Prime featuring Matthew Koma – "Cannonball (Earthquake)" (Kryder Remix) [SPRS]
- 2014: Arno Cost and Norman Doray – "Apocalypse 2014" (Kryder and Tom Staar Remix) [Spinnin' Records]
- 2014: Armin van Buuren – "Ping Pong" (Kryder and Tom Staar Remix) [Armada Music]
- 2014: Kölsch featuring Troels Abrahamsen – "All That Matters" (Kryder Remix) [Axtone Records]
- 2015: L'Tric – "This Feeling" (Kryder Remix) [Neon Records]
- 2015: Michael Calfan – "Treasured Soul" (Kryder and Genairo Nvilla Remix) [Spinnin' Remixes]
- 2015: Sam Feldt featuring Jaya Beach-Robertson – "Show Me Love" (Kryder and Tom Staar Remix) [Spinnin' Remixes]
- 2015: Dimitri Vegas & Like Mike vs. Ummet Ozcan – "The Hum" (Kryder and Tom Staar Remix) [Smash The House]
- 2015: Tommy Trash featuring JHart – "Wake the Giant" (Kryder and Tom Tyger Remix) [Armada Music]
- 2015: David Guetta featuring Sia and Fetty Wap – "Bang My Head" (Kryder and Dave Winnel Remix) [What A Music]
- 2016: Chicane – "Saltwater" (Kryder Remix) [Xtravaganza]
- 2017: Provenzano and Federico Scavo – "Folegandros" (Kryder Mix) [Cartel Recordings]
- 2018: Nico de Andrea – "The Shape" (Kryder Remix) [Spinnin' Records]
- 2018: Benny Benassi – "Everybody Needs a Kiss" (Kryder Remix)
- 2018: Basement Jaxx – "Bingo Bango" (Tom Staar and Kryder Remix) [XL Recordings]
- 2019: Lost Frequencies featuring Flynn – "Recognise" (Kryder Remix) [Found Frequencies]
- 2020: Grum featuring Natalie Shay – "Afterglow" (Kryder Remix)
- 2020: David Tort – "Afraid of the Dark" (Kryder Remix)
- 2020: York – "On the Beach" (Kryder Remix)
- 2021: Ilan Bluestone and Maor Levi featuring Alex Clare – "Hold On" (Kryder Remix)
- 2021: Solarstone – "When I Dream" (Kryder Remix)
- 2021: Nervo and Tube & Berger – "Lights Down Low" (Kryder Remix)
- 2022: DJ Kuba and Neitan & Bounce Inc – "Watch Out" (Kryder and Thomas Newson Remix)
- 2022: Richard Durand and Christina Novelli – "The Air I Breathe" (Kryder Remix)
- 2022: Chicane – "Offshore" (Kryder Remix)
