= Andrew Rayel =

Moldovan DJ

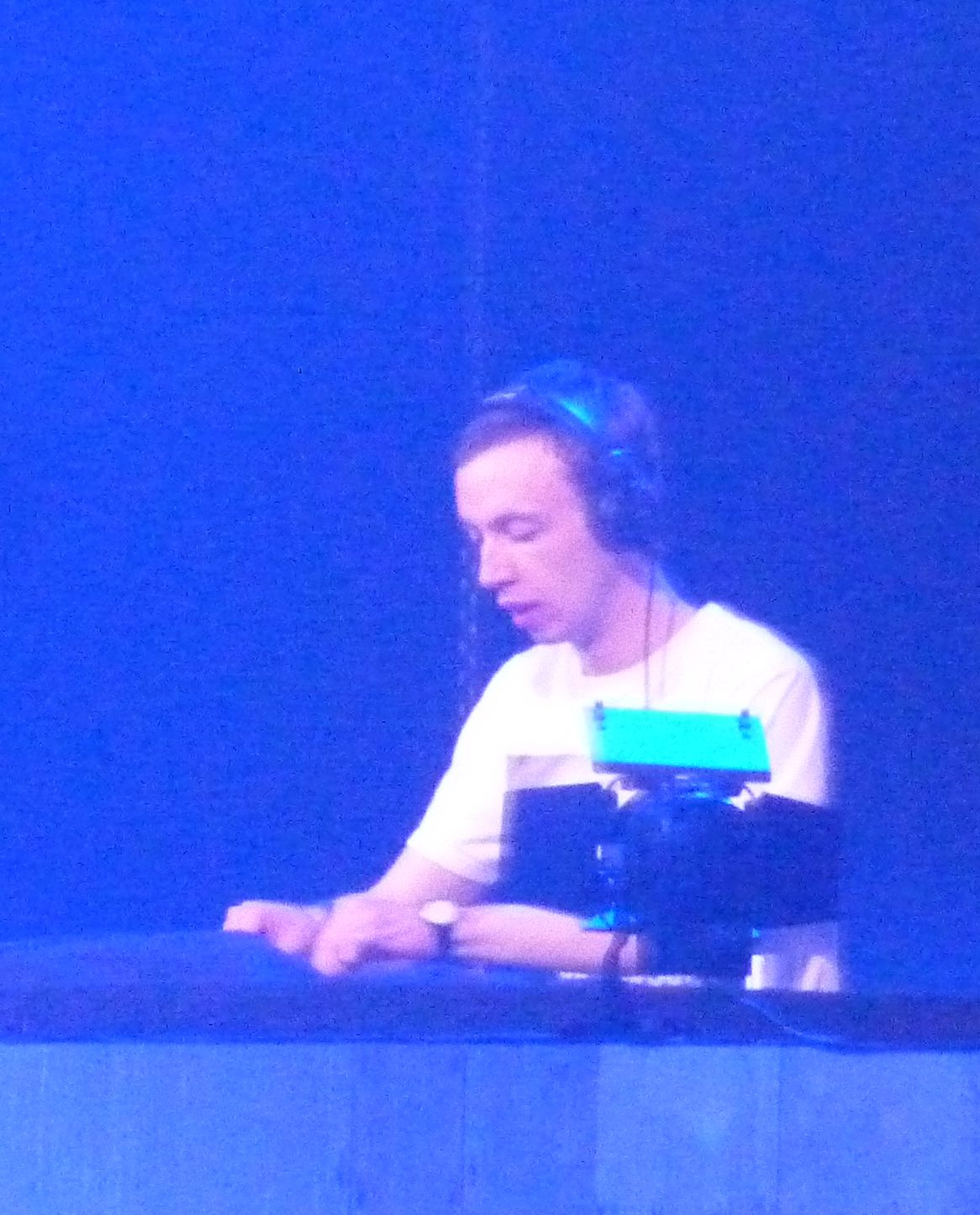
- Rayel in 2013

Background information
- Born: Andrei Rață; 21 July 1992 (age 33); Călărași, Moldova
- Origin: Moldova
- Genres: Trance
- Occupations: Electronic musician, composer, record producer, DJ
- Instruments: Synthesizer, strings, piano
- Years active: 2009–present
- Labels: Armada Music, inHarmony Music
- Spouse: Daniela Prisacaru (m. 2022)
- Website: Official website

Andrei Rață (born 21 July 1992), better known by his stage name Andrew Rayel, is a Moldovan producer and DJ. Initially releasing his music on Armada Music, Rayel founded the label "inHarmony Music" on 22 September 2017, where his role is label chief and head of A&R.

== Musical career ==
Rayel's electronic music career started in 2009 at age 17, but he had started to produce music and develop his style four years earlier. He is signed under the Armada Music label, co-founded by Armin van Buuren. His breakthrough followed his single "Aether" being voted as "Tune of the Week" on Van Buuren's radio program, A State of Trance. He performed at various "A State of Trance" events.

He has DJ’ed in notable clubs and large festivals, from Ultra Music Festival, to Tomorrowland, Stereosonic, Electric Daisy Carnival, Ministry of Sound to multiple A State of Trance events, the A State of Trance Ibiza nights and the Monday Bar cruise, as well as AfterHills Music Festival in Iasi, Romania in May–June 2017.

Rayel's tracks are frequently played by DJs and producers around the world, including Armin van Buuren, Tiësto, W&W, Dash Berlin, Hardwell and many others. In 2012, Rayel was ranked number 77 in DJ Mag's Top 100 DJs; he was ranked #28 in 2013, winning the title of "highest climber" in the ranking. His ascent continued in 2014, as being ranked #24. Rayel announced in 2013 that a new artist album was to be released in 2014.

In August 2013, Rayel announced his first official compilation, titled Mystery of Aether, including tracks from van Buuren, Ørjan Nilsen, Airbase and W&W, among others. It included new songs and remixes performed by Rayel. The album was released on 6 September 2013. In September 2013, he made an entry for the song he worked for the ASOT 650 Anthem contest, however did not win the contest.

Rayel's first studio album, Find Your Harmony, was released on 30 May 2014.

Rayel's second studio album, Moments, was released in May 2017. This album was supported by a solo "Moments Tour" that consisted of shows throughout the U.S./North America, Europe and Asia. The lead single from the album is titled “I’ll Be There” featuring Eric Lumiere.

On 22 September 2017, Andrew Rayel launched his own record label, inHarmony Music (distributed by Armada Music), as a platform to release his tracks and to promote new talents in the electronic music scene. He released the label together with single "Mass Effect" on the same day, and a collaboration with Bogdan Vix & Keyplayer titled "Soul On The Run" featuring Roxana Constantin on 2 December 2017.

Rayel's first single of 2018 titled "Horizon" was released on 9 February through label "inHarmony Music", and featured American singer Lola Blanc. He released "Trance ReBorn" on 9 March 2018, which was a collaboration with Dutch DJ David Gravell and served as the main anthem for the 100th episode of Rayel's Find Your Harmony radio show. On 20 April 2018, he collaborated with Graham Bell to release "Tambores", a trance-influenced big room house track which was initially debuted in his 2018 Ultra Music Festival performance. He released "Dark Resistance" on 11 May 2018, "In The Dark" with Haliene on 1 June 2018, and "New Dawn" with Corti Organ and Max Cameron on 6 July 2018. Rayel underwent a change in his big room sound with the release of "Last Summer" with Fernando Garibay, featuring Jake Torrey, on 3 August 2018, which was a pop song that incorporated aspects of acoustic music. Rayel told Billboard that the track was an "completely unexpected sound", and that he enjoyed "experimenting and trying something [he has] never done before".

== Personal life ==
In August 2021, Andrew announced his engagement to his girlfriend of six years Daniela Prisacaru in New York.

== Discography ==
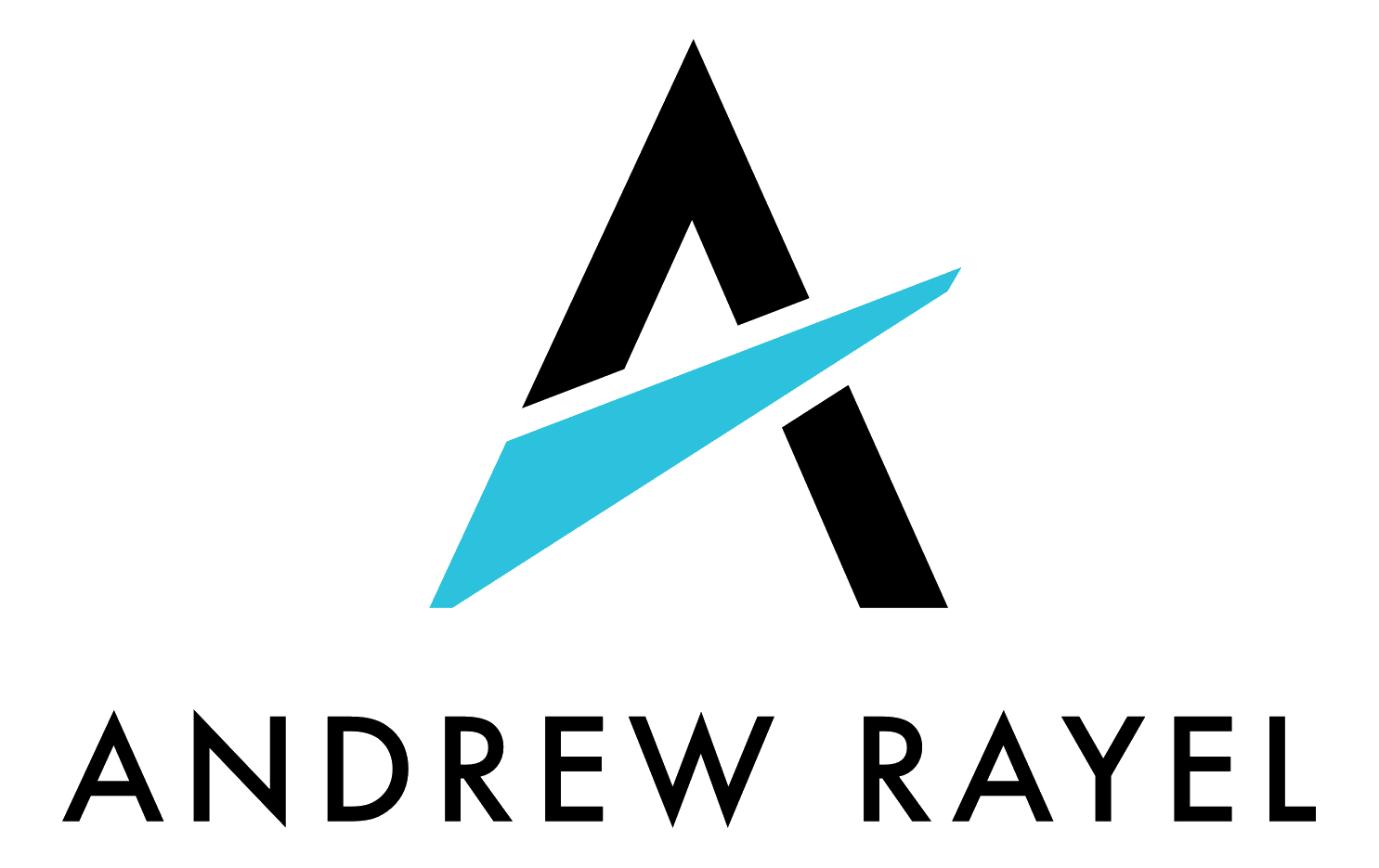
Andrew Rayel's DJ logo

=== Studio albums ===
- 2014 Find Your Harmony
- 2017 Moments
- 2023 Lifeline

=== Compilation albums ===
- 2013 Mystery of Aether
- 2014 Find Your Harmony 2015

=== Singles ===
- 2010 "Always In Your Dreams" (featuring Flaya)
- 2011 "Aether"
- 2011 "Opera"
- 2011 "Drapchi / Deflageration"
- 2011 "550 Senta / Believe"
- 2011 "We Never Come Back"
- 2011 "Globalization"
- 2012 "Aeon of Revenge / Source Code"
- 2012 "How Do I Know" (featuring Jano)
- 2012 "Coriolis / Exponential"
- 2013 "Musa / Zeus"
- 2013 "Sacramentum" (with Bobina)
- 2013 "Until the End" (with Jwaydan)
- 2013 "Dark Warrior"
- 2014 "Eiforya" (with Armin van Buuren)
- 2014 "Goodbye" (featuring Alexandra Badoi)
- 2014 "Power of Elements" (Trancefusion 2014 Anthem)
- 2014 "One In A Million" (featuring Jonathan Mendelsohn)
- 2014 "Followed By Darkness"
- 2015 "Impulse"
- 2015 "Miracles" (featuring Christian Burns)
- 2015 "We Bring The Love" (featuring Sylvia Tosun)
- 2015 "Daylight" (featuring Jonny Rose)
- 2015 "Mimesis" (with Alexander Popov)
- 2015 "Chased" (with Mark Sixma)
- 2015 “Rise of the Era”
- 2016 "Winterburn" (with Digital X featuring Sylvia Tosun)
- 2016 "Once In a Lifetime Love" (featuring Kristina Antuna)
- 2016 "Epiphany"
- 2016 "All Systems Down" (with KhoMha)
- 2016 "Take It All" (with Jochen Miller featuring Hansen Tomas)
- 2017 "I'll Be There" (featuring Eric Lumiere)
- 2017 "My Reflection" (featuring Emma Hewitt)
- 2017 "Lighthouse" (featuring Christina Novelli)
- 2017 "Heavy Love" (with Max Vangeli featuring Kye Sones)
- 2017 "Home" (featuring Jonathan Mendelsohn)
- 2017 "Mass Effect"
- 2017 "Soul On The Run" (with Bogdan Vix and KeyPlayer featuring Roxana Constantin)
- 2018 "Horizon" (featuring Lola Blanc)
- 2018 "Trance Reborn" (with David Gravell)
- 2018 "Tambores" (with Graham Bell)
- 2018 "Dark Resistance"
- 2018 "In The Dark" (with Haliene)
- 2018 "New Dawn" (with Corti Organ and Max Cameron)
- 2018 "Last Summer" (with Fernando Garibay featuring Jake Torrey)
- 2019 "The Melody" (with Nwyr)
- 2019 "Originem (FYH 150 Anthem)"
- 2019 "Take All of Me" (with Haliene)
- 2019 "Kick, Bass & Trance" (with Chukiess & Whackboi)
- 2020 "Light Side of the Harmony (FYH 200 Anthem)"
- 2020 "Dark Side of the Harmony (FYH 200 Anthem)"
- 2020 "Stars Collide" (with Robbie Seed featuring That Girl)
- 2020 "Never Going Down" (with Roxanne Emery)
- 2020 "Everything Everything" (with Olivia Sebastianelli)
- 2021 "Carry You Home" (with Tensteps featuring Runaground)
- 2021 "Silver Lining"
- 2021 "River" (with Aidyl)
- 2021 "Closer" (with Takis featuring Zagata)

=== Remixes ===
- 2011 Karybde & Scilla – "Tokyo" (Andrew Rayel Remix)
- 2011 Ruben de Ronde – "Timide" (Andrew Rayel Remix)
- 2011 Faruk Sabanci – "Maidens Tower 2011" (Andrew Rayel 1AM Remix)
- 2011 W&W and Jonas Stenberg – "Alligator F**khouse" (Andrew Rayel Stadium Remix)
- 2011 Tiësto featuring Kay - "Work Hard, Play Hard" (Andrew Rayel Hard Remix)
- 2012 Luke Terry – "Tales from the Forest" (Andrew Rayel Sunrise / Sundown Remixes)
- 2012 Craig Connelly – "Robot Wars" (Andrew Rayel Stadium Remix)
- 2012 Roger Shah featuring Carla Werner – "One Love" (Andrew Rayel Remix)
- 2012 Fabio XB, Wach and Roman Sokolovsky – "Eternal" (Andrew Rayel Remix)
- 2012 Fady & Mina – "Kepler 22" (Andrew Rayel Aether Remix)
- 2012 Bobina – "The Space Track" (Andrew Rayel Stadium Remix)
- 2012 Tenishia – "Where Do We Begin" (Andrew Rayel Remix)
- 2012 Armin van Buuren featuring Jan Vayne – "Serenity" (Andrew Rayel Aether Remix)
- 2013 Armin van Buuren and Markus Schulz – "The Expedition" (ASOT 600 Anthem) [Andrew Rayel Remix]
- 2013 Andy Moor and Betsie Larkin – "Love Again" (Andrew Rayel Remix)
- 2013 Kyau & Albert - "All Your Colours" (Andrew Rayel Remix)
- 2013 Zedd featuring Foxes - "Clarity" (Andrew Rayel Remix)
- 2013 Jamaster A featuring Bi Bi Zhou- "I Miss You Missing Me" (Andrew Rayel vs. Jamaster A Stadium Remix)
- 2013 Dash Berlin featuring Sarah Howells - "Go It Alone" (Andrew Rayel Remix)
- 2013 Alex M.O.R.P.H. featuring Silvia Tosun - "An Angel's Love" (Andrew Rayel Aether Remix)
- 2013 Faithless - "Insomnia" (Andrew Rayel Remix) (Was never released)
- 2013 Armin van Buuren - "Intense" (Andrew Rayel Remix)
- 2013 Airbase - Modus Operandi (Andrew Rayel Intro Mix)
- 2014 Hardwell featuring Matthew Koma - "Dare You" (Andrew Rayel Remix)
- 2014 Ivan Gough and Feenixpawl featuring Georgi Kai - "In My Mind" (Andrew Rayel Remix)
- 2014 Sick Individuals - "Wasting Moonlight" (Andrew Rayel Remix)
- 2015 Armin van Buuren - "Save My Night" (Andrew Rayel Remix)
- 2015 Cosmic Gate and Kristina Antuna - "Alone" (Andrew Rayel Remix)
- 2015 Tommy Trash featuring JHart - "Wake The Giant" (Andrew Rayel Remix)
- 2015 Lost Frequencies featuring Janieck Devy - "Reality" (Andrew Rayel Remix)
- 2015 Dimitri Vegas & Like Mike featuring Ne-Yo - "Higher Place" (Andrew Rayel Remix)
- 2015 Dash Berlin - "Till The Sky Falls Down" (Andrew Rayel Remix)
- 2016 Armin van Buuren featuring Eric Vloeimans - "Embrace" (Andrew Rayel Remix)
- 2016 Armin van Buuren featuring Betsie Larkin - "Again" (Andrew Rayel Remix)
- 2017 Armin van Buuren and Garibay featuring Olaf Blackwood - I Need You (Andrew Rayel Remix)
- 2017 Mark Sixma and Emma Hewitt - "Missing" (Andrew Rayel and Mark Sixma Remix)
- 2017 Tiësto - "Adagio For Strings" (Andrew Rayel Remix) (Was never released)
- 2019 Armin van Buuren - "Lifting You Higher" (Andrew Rayel Remix)
- 2019 The Chainsmokers and Illenium featuring Lennon Stella - "Takeaway" (Andrew Rayel Remix)
- 2021 Gareth Emery featuring Annabel - You'll Be OK (Andrew Rayel Remix)
