= Burn the Sky Down =

Burn The Sky Down

Studio album by Emma Hewitt
- Released: May 18, 2012
- Recorded: 2010–12
- Genre: Ambient, electronic, pop
- Length: 42:45
- Label: Armada
- Producer: Lee Groves

Singles from Burn The Sky Down
- 1. "Colours" Released: January 16, 2012; 2. "Miss You Paradise" Released: April 30, 2012; 3. "Foolish Boy" Released: August 27, 2012; 4. "Rewind" Released: December 17, 2012; 5. "Crucify" Released: March 18, 2013

Burn The Sky Down is the debut studio album by Australian singer Emma Hewitt, released on May 18, 2012.

The album was produced by Lee Groves, who created "... the ambient soundscapes [the team was] looking for ...".

On July 27, 2012, a separate remix album was released titled, Burn the Sky Down (The Remixes). Some of the remixers on the album include Armin van Buuren, Cosmic Gate, tyDi, Morgan Page, Shogun, Arnej, Matt Darey, Ivan Gough, and Jerome Isma-Ae.

== Track listing ==
No.	Title	Writer(s)	Length
1.	"Burn The Sky Down"	Emma Hewitt	1:43
2.	"Colours"	E. Hewitt; Anthony Hewitt	4:01
3.	"Miss You Paradise"	E. Hewitt; A. Hewitt	3:31
4.	"These Days Are Ours"	E. Hewitt; A. Hewitt; Joshua Gabriel	3:47
5.	"Foolish Boy"	E. Hewitt; Lee Groves; A. Hewitt; Ivan Gough	4:15
6.	"Rewind"	E. Hewitt; A. Hewitt	3:20
7.	"Still Remember You (Stay Forever)"	E. Hewitt; A. Hewitt; Tijs Verwest	4:22
8.	"Can't Turn Around Now"	E. Hewitt	1:50
9.	"Crucify"	E. Hewitt; A. Hewitt	3:51
10.	"This Picture (Placebo cover)"	Steve Hewitt; Brian Molko; Stefan Olsdal	3:31
11.	"State That I'm In"	E. Hewitt; A. Hewitt	2:34
12.	"Circles" (with 16 Bit Lolitas)	E. Hewitt; Ariaan Olieroock; A. Hewitt; Peter Kriek	5:55

iTunes Bonus Tracks
No.	Title	Length
13.	"Like Spinning Plates" (with Dash Berlin)	6:33

== Charts ==
=== Peak positions ===
Chart (2012)	Peak position
Poland (Polska Album Top 100)	38
