= Turning Me On =

Turning Me On may refer to:

== Music ==
- "Turning Me On", a 1988 song by Tommy Page
- "Turning Me On", a song by Shifty Shellshock from the 2004 album Happy Love Sick
- "Turnin' Me On" (Nina Sky song), a 2004 song by Nina Sky from their 2004 album Nina Sky
- "Turning Me On", a song by Frankie DeCarlos from the 2008 album Frankie DeCarlos
- "Turning Me On", a song by Da'Ville from 2009 album Ichiban
- "Turning Me On", song by Andy Moor from the 2012 album Zero Point One

== See also ==
- Turnin' Me On (disambiguation)
