= The Inner Me =

The Inner Me may refer to:

- The Inner Me (Ashley Wallbridge album)
- The Inner Me (Lala Hsu album)
