= SHY & DRS =

Scottish musical duo

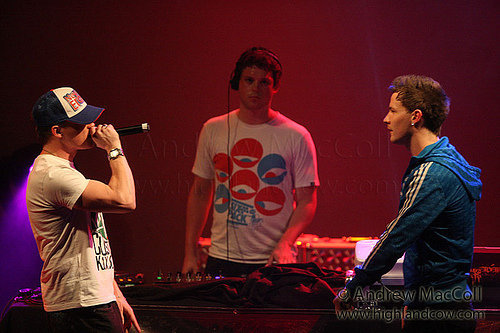
- SHY & DRS performing at Rockness in 2010

Background information
- Born: Mark Scott and Darren Scott
- Origin: Aberdeen, Scotland
- Genres: Hip Hop, Rap
- Instrument: Vocals
- Years active: 1999–present
- Labels: Awe Records (2008 - 09); Guardian Angels Records/Universal (2011–2013); Unparallel Music Group/Unsigned; The Orchard/Sony (2014-present)
- Members: Mark James Scott; Darren Scott
- Website: Instagram / Facebook @shyanddrs

Mark James Scott and Darren Scott, better known by their stage name SHY & DRS, are twin Scottish artists and songwriters who achieved 4 Top 40 Official UK Chart singles independently.

== Early life ==
Born in Aberdeen, Scotland the twin brothers Mark and Darren were discovered by Midge Ure and Virgin Records ex-head of A&R Ronnie Gurr in 2009, and pioneered Scottish Hip Hop.

== Career ==
They achieved 4 Official UK Chart, Top 40 singles independently and signed with singer Sandi Thom and her record label, Guardian Angels Records

They were on The X Factor 2016, getting all yes's from the judges and appearing on ITV2s The Xtra Factor alongside Katie Price, Rylan Clark and Megan McKenna.

=== 2011–2012: Signing and "The Love Is Gone" ===
SHY & DRS were signed to Guardian Angels Records, a label distributed by Fontana Universal and Sony ATV, a record label run by Sandi Thom and Nick Yeatman until 2013, when the label terminated. The debut single featuring Sandi Thom charted in the Official Chart at number 32. In an interview in October 2012, SHY & DRS explained it was filmed in 2009 and the accompanying music video was based on the movie, Sin City. The music video premiered VEVO on September 12, 2012, and played on Music Television on 21 September 2012. The single made Scottish radio DJ Jim Gellatly's "Scotland's Greatest Album" in December 2012.

=== 2012-2013: "Relapse", "I've Got (Enough Love)" and Before Too Long ===
In July 2013, SHY & DRS released their debut studio album, Before Too Long, which features guest vocals from Sandi Thom, Nazareth, Eminem's band D12 and Daniel de Bourg. The album entered into the Top 20 iTunes Hip hop Chart and remained there for six consecutive weeks.

In 2013, they released single "I've Got (Enough Love)" accompanied with a music video to VEVO which featured rock band Nazareth. The single was covered by Classic Rock magazine. The single, initially titled "Enough Love", was recorded in Munich, Germany in person with Nazareth. Their manager Ronnie Gurr took the pair on a trip to meet Nazareth on tour to record the single together years prior, in 2010. It was recorded in an old war bunker which was converted into a recording studio. They recorded two singles together, the other being "Day 2 Day" featuring Dan McCafferty, lead vocalist of Nazareth. The music video was filmed on tour with Nazareth in 2014, playing venues such as the O2 Newcastle and The Brook in Southampton.

SHY & DRS' second single featuring BBC Introducing artist Luke Bingham was a re-release of their viral hit "Relapse" in April 2013, with the video performed and sung by Keenan Cahill, and the release of the SHY & DRS brand energy drink by Nae Danger. The song entered the Scottish Singles Chart at number 40.

In August 2013, they released an animated music video onto VEVO which features rapper Bizarre from D12.

In July 2013 they released a charity track recorded with Northsound 1 Bauer radio presenters Greigsy & Aylissa which went into the Top 10 UK iTunes hip hop chart.

=== 2014 - "Born Again" with Christina Novelli ===
In February 2014, it was announced that they are leaving for the US with a new label deal with Sony and under new management.

SHY & DRS formed their own independent label, Unparallel Music Group, and released "Born Again" with British trance singer Christina Novelli in August 2014. "Born Again" charted independently at number 26 in the Official Scottish Chart and at number 14 on the Music Week Indie Chart in its first week. The video was removed from YouTube for its controversial subject and scenes but was kept on VEVO. The video was later reissued on the YouTube channel.

They performed "Born Again" and their first official Top 40 single "The Love is Gone" live on BBC Radio Scotland's Culture Show and were interviewed by Janice Forsyth, who dubbed them "Scottish hiphop's most exciting export", revealing they were touring with Eminem's band D12 in 2015.

SHY & DRS featured on Keenan Cahill's single "Closer" in 2014 which was premiered on Ryan Seacrest's radio show and website. The song was performed live on German TV and American WGN-TV channel.

=== 2015 "Beautiful To Me" with Janet Devlin ===
On 13 November 2015 they released the single "Beautiful to Me" featuring X-Factor's Janet Devlin. The song was the official single for the UK's National Anti-Bullying Week and charted at number 25 on the official chart. The song raised money for Childline UK and UK anti-bullying charity Ditch the Label. They later went on tour with Devlin to promote the single.

=== The X Factor 2016 ===
They were on The X Factor 2016, getting all yes's from the judges and appearing on ITV2s The Xtra Factor alongside Katie Price, Rylan Clark and Megan McKenna. The brothers later said that they were asked to go on the show after being seen by show scouts performing with opera singer Nicola Cassells. They were later removed from the show when it was discovered that they were still under a record contract deal.

=== 2020: Second Studio Album and Collaboration with Angel ===
In 2020 they released a single with R&B star Angel. The single entered the UK Chart at number 55. The single's remix version featured more than ten artists including D Double E, Emily Middlemas, NoLay, and Bera.

The "What's Wrong With Us?" music video achieved 260,000 views in less than two weeks. It was featured on Link Up TV, a UK hip hop publisher.

Their second studio album Act Your Wage was released later that year. The album featured an unreleased collaboration with members of D12 recorded in 2014. The album achieved two million streams in its first year of release.

== Business ==
The pair are sponsored by Nae Danger energy drink based in Glasgow, part owned by Duncan Bannatyne. In July 2013, Nae Danger released a "SHY & DRS" brand energy drink that features their image on the cans, giving a free download of their track "Relapse".

Whilst still doing music, Mark has since started a career in creative direction, brand consulting and art direction, and worked as art director on The Game's albums Born 2 Rap and Drillmatic.

Also working with Diddy on his album The Love Album: Off the Grid.

== Personal life ==
Darren graduated from Aberdeen University in 2008 with a First Class Honours Degree in Sociology, while Mark graduated with a First Class Honours Degree in Psychology and Postgraduate Master's degree in Psychology. They began rapping in American accents but later changed to using a Scottish accent.

== Discography ==
=== Albums ===
- 2006: The Unexpected
- 2008: Behind Closed Doors
- 2013: Before Too Long
- 2020: Act Your Wage

=== EPs ===
- 2013: Read All About It EP
- 2023: The Lost Tapes

=== Singles ===
List of singles, with selected chart positions, showing year released and album name
Year	Title	Peak chart positions			Album
Year	Title	UK	IRE	SCO	Album
2012	"The Love Is Gone" (featuring Sandi Thom)	139	—	32	Before Too Long
2013	"Relapse" (featuring Luke Bingham)	188	—	40	Before Too Long and Behind Closed Doors
2013	"I've Got (Enough Love)" (featuring Nazareth)	—	—	57	Before Too Long
2014	"Born Again" (featuring Christina Novelli)	109	—	26	Non-album singles
2015	"Beautiful to Me" (featuring Janet Devlin)	85	178	25	Non-album singles
2015	"What's Wrong With Us?" (featuring Angel)	165	225	55	
2020	"Lewis Capaldi"	207	214	61	
2020	"Flex"	—	—	78	
"—" denotes a single that did not chart or was not released.

Featured in

- 2013: "Closer" with Keenan Cahill featuring SHY & DRS (also Closer (The Remixes) EP released in 2014)
