= Hotel Rooms =

Studio album by tyDi
- Released: 22 November 2013
- Recorded: 2013
- Genre: Electronic, chillout, orchestral, glitch electronica
- Length: 88:51
- Label: Armada
- Producer: tyDi

TyDi chronology
Global Soundsystem 2012: California (2012)	Hotel Rooms (2013)

Professional ratings
Review scores
Source	Rating

Hotel Rooms is a 2013 release from Tyson Illingworth, better known as tyDi. It is a compilation of his non-dance music tracks, some of which had been previously released. The album features the vocals of Tania Zygar, Audrey Gallagher, Kane, Luke Mansini, Carmen Keigans, and Christina Novelli.

== Track listing ==
Hotel Rooms
No.	Title	Lyrics	Length
1.	"Gravity"	Carmen Keigans	2:22
2.	"Chasing Nothing"	Luke Mansini	3:24
3.	"Fire & Load (Stripped)"	Christina Novelli	3:18
4.	"Before It Happens"		3:44
5.	"So Close"		2:16
6.	"Ashley's Theme"		3:42
7.	"Qf15"		3:00
8.	"Her Lullaby"		1:45
9.	"Vanilla"	Tania Zygar	4:15
10.	"Nightfall in Suburbia"		3:47
11.	"Red & Black"		4:03
12.	"Ariana"		3:20
13.	"Let You Go"		4:32
14.	"Interlude"		1:42
15.	"I Like, You Like"		7:04
16.	"Worlds Apart"	Audrey Gallagher	3:57
17.	"Meet Me in Kyoto"		3:19
18.	"A Picture Never Taken"	Kane	3:50
19.	"Half of Everything"		1:02
20.	"The Moment It Breaks"	Tania Zygar	3:28
21.	"Look Closer"		5:09
22.	"How Much Longer?"		4:17
23.	"The Camera Doesn't Lie, but You Do"		4:15
24.	"Confirmation Bias"	Kane	4:32
25.	"Sophie's Theme"		2:48
Total length:			89:05

== Release history ==
Country	Release date
Worldwide (Digital)	22 November 2013
