= Born Again (SHY & DRS song) =

Single by SHY & DRS featuring Christina Novelli
- Released: 22 July 2014
- Recorded: 2014
- Genre: Indie
- Length: 3:31
- Label: Unparallel Music Group
- Songwriter(s): Darren Scott

SHY & DRS singles chronology
"Out My Face" (2013)	"Born Again" (2014)

Christina Novelli singles chronology
"Born Again" (2014)

Music video
- "Born Again" on YouTube

"Born Again" is a 2014 single by Scottish rappers and songwriter twin brothers SHY & DRS featuring the additional vocals of the British trance singer Christina Novelli. It was released on the independent record label Unparallel Music Group established by the brothers.

== Music video ==
The music video was very controversial. DRS (Darren Robert Scott) explained the "song is about splitting up with someone and that feeling of becoming a new person".

But the twins wanted the accompanying video to have a more literal meaning and thus the scene of a woman giving birth to two full-grown-up men (SHY and DRS) who continue to perform their song "Born Again" still covered in blood as the birth-giving woman dies on the operation table.

The gory video was removed from YouTube swiftly following many complaints from viewers. The video was later reissued on the YouTube Channel.

== Charts ==
The single made it to the Top 40 Scottish Singles Chart peaking at number 26.

The single also reached number 14 on the Music Week Indie Chart in its first week of release.

Chart (2010)	Peak position
Scottish Singles Chart	26
