= The Inner Me (Ashley Wallbridge album) =

Studio album by Ashley Wallbridge
- Released: March 9, 2012
- Recorded: 2011–2012
- Genres: Progressive house, electronic, ambient
- Label: Armada Music
- Producer: Ashley Wallbridge

Singles from The Inner Me
- 1. "Meta4" Released: February 6, 2012; 2. "Mumbai Traffic" Released: March 19, 2012; 3. "World To Turn" Released: April 30, 2012; 4. "Zorro" Released: May 22, 2012; 5. "Bang The Drum" Released: July 2, 2012; 6. "Keep The Fire" Released: August 20, 2012

The Inner Me is the debut full-length studio album by EDM producer, remixer, and DJ Ashley Wallbridge which was released on March 9, 2012 on Armada Music. The album was written and recorded over the course of 1.5 years. The album features new collaborations from artists such as Kobalt Infusion, Audrey Gallagher, and Matias Lehtola along with returning collaborations with artists such as Andy Moor and Elleah.

== Track listing ==
No.	Title	Length
1.	"Emotions"	2:04
2.	"These Walls" (feat. Elleah)	3:15
3.	"Kopanang" (feat. Kobalt Infusion)	5:00
4.	"Careful"	6:21
5.	"Zorro"	5:49
6.	"Faces" (with Andy Moor) (feat. Meighan Nealon) (The Inner Me Mix)	5:48
7.	"Soul Seek"	4:22
8.	"Vision"	4:40
9.	"Meta4"	3:30
10.	"Mumbai Traffic"	4:07
11.	"Keep The Fire" (feat. Elleah)	5:56
12.	"Ibiza"	5:27
13.	"World To Turn" (with Andy Moor) (feat. Gabriela)	4:20
14.	"Bang The Drum" (feat. Audrey Gallagher)	4:37
15.	"Feel Again" (feat. Matias Lehtola)	3:49

iTunes Bonus Tracks
No.	Title	Length
16.	"Jynx"	5:17
17.	"Sunrise"	7:40
