= AVA Recordings =

Electronical dance record label

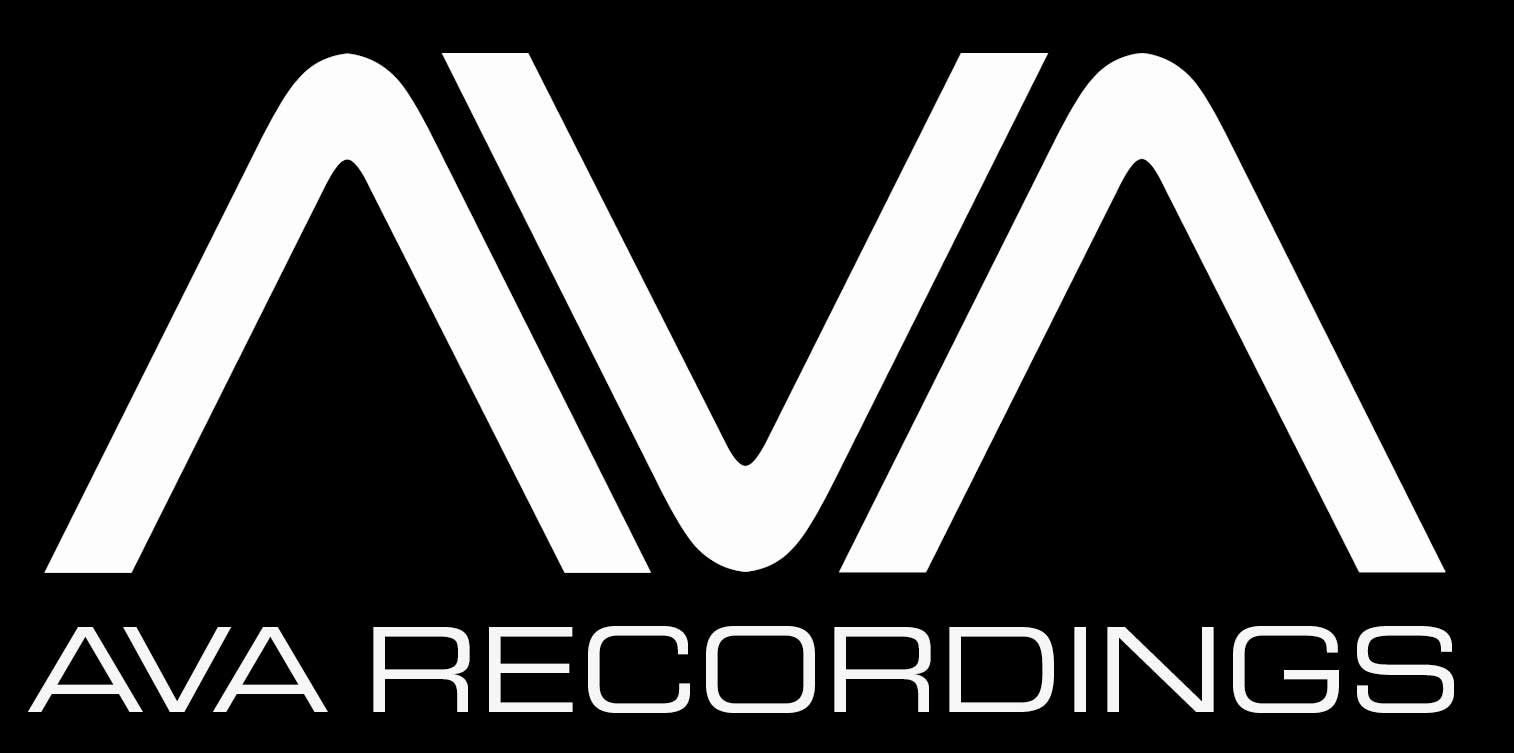
- Founded: 2006
- Founder: Andy Moor, and in 2014 Somna joined as partner & co-owner.
- Distributors: Armada Music (2008–2014); Black Hole Recordings (2014–present)
- Genre: EDM; trance; progressive trance; uplifting trance
- Country of origin: United Kingdom
- Location: Stoke on Trent, England / Vancouver, Canada
- Official website: www.avarecordings.com

AVA Recordings is an electronic dance music record label founded in early 2006 by UK producer & DJ Andy Moor. In 2014, Vancouver based producer & DJ Somna (Benjamin Leung) joined the label as Moor's partner and co-owner. AVA Recordings was a sub label of Armada Music from December 2008 until 2014, at which point the label joined Black Hole Recordings.

AVA Recordings showcasts top caliber artists in the trance and progressive genres of electronic dance music.

== Andy Moor, Founder ==
Andy Moor has a prolific career in music production under his own name, through various aliases (Dub Disorder, Dwight van Man, Sworn) and as part of production partnerships like Tilt, Whiteroom, Leama & Moor and Zoo DJ's. He has received numerous recognitions for his work including a Grammy nomination in December 2007 for his remix of Delerium's Angelicus. Moor is best known for production techniques like vocal chops and syncopated basslines.

Moor founded AVA Recordings, a trance and progressive record label, in early 2006.

== Somna, Co-Owner ==
In 2014, Canadian producer and DJ Somna (Benjamin Leung) joined Andy Moor as a partner and co-owner of the label.

Somna's music can be found on some of the top record labels in the genre including Armada Music, Go On Air Recordings, Black Hole Recordings, Future Sound of Egypt, Perfecto and of course, AVA Recordings.

As well as creating his own music, Somna handles AVA Recordings' operations and business planning as label manager, co-owner and A&R.

== 2006 - 2014: The Early Years ==
The early years of AVA Recordings saw releases from some of today's most recognizable names in trance music including Orkidea, Sean Tyas, Lange, Ben Nicky, Sunny Lax and RAM.

Notable artists Ashley Wallbridge, TyDi, Mat Zo, Omnia and Tritonal are just a few artists whose early musical careers began at AVA Recordings.

== 2014 - Present ==
In recent years AVA Recordings has undergone significant growth and expansion.

- April 2015 saw the release of the label's milestone 100th release a collaboration between Andy Moor & Somna ft Amy Kirkpatrick - One Thing About You, becoming Beatport's #1 streamed trance track of 2015.
- In November 2016, AVA Recordings released a 3 disc compilation called AVA Ten Years, celebrating 10 years of the record label and showcasing tunes that span the past, present and future.
- Also in 2016, ten years after the label's conception, the team decided it was time to branch out and create a home for the more uplifting side of trance. AVA White was the result - an uplifting trance sister label with Polish artist A.R.D.I. acting as A&R.
- Bringing the growing brand to clubbing locations worldwide, 'AVA Night' events feature resident artists and guests and has touched down in countries like Japan, Indonesia, Switzerland and Canada.

== Past & Present Artists of AVA Recordings ==
- Adara
- Andy Moor
- Arman Bahrami
- Ashley Wallbridge
- Attila Syah
- Audrey Gallagher
- Ayden Casey
- Beat&Voice
- Ben Nicky
- Brian Magix
- Brisker & Magitman
- Carrie Skipper
- Davey Asprey
- David Forbes
- David West
- Diana Leah
- DJ Dean
- DJ TH
- Drival
- Easton
- Effen
- Einat
- Enzo
- Eximinds
- Faruk Sabanci
- Gerome
- Get Massive
- Hans Seo
- Hazem Beltagui
- Jav D
- Jennifer Rene
- Johann Stone
- Joonas Hahmo
- Joseph Areas
- Josh Bailey
- Kukuzenko
- Lange
- Linnea Schossow
- Lowland
- LTN
- Luke Anders
- Luke Bond
- Mat Zo
- Masoud
- Mathew Duncan
- Matt Cerf
- Max Millian
- Memory Loss
- Michele C
- Mike Koglin
- Mike Saint-Jules
- Milad E
- Mixail
- Nifra
- Omnia
- Orkidea
- Parity
- Paul van Dyk
- RAM
- RELEGI
- Rinaly
- Rio Lorenzo
- Roxanne Emery
- Sam Laxton
- Sean Mathews
- Sean Tyas
- Sense8
- Sheridan Grout
- Signalrunners
- Slusnik Luna
- Somna
- Sue McLaren
- Sunny Lax
- Tempo Giusto
- Tenishia
- Theo
- TheRio
- Thomas Mengel
- Tomac
- Tony Hammer
- Tritonal
- TyDi
- Venice
- Yang
- Yuri Kane

== See also ==
- List of record labels
