= TyDi =

tyDi
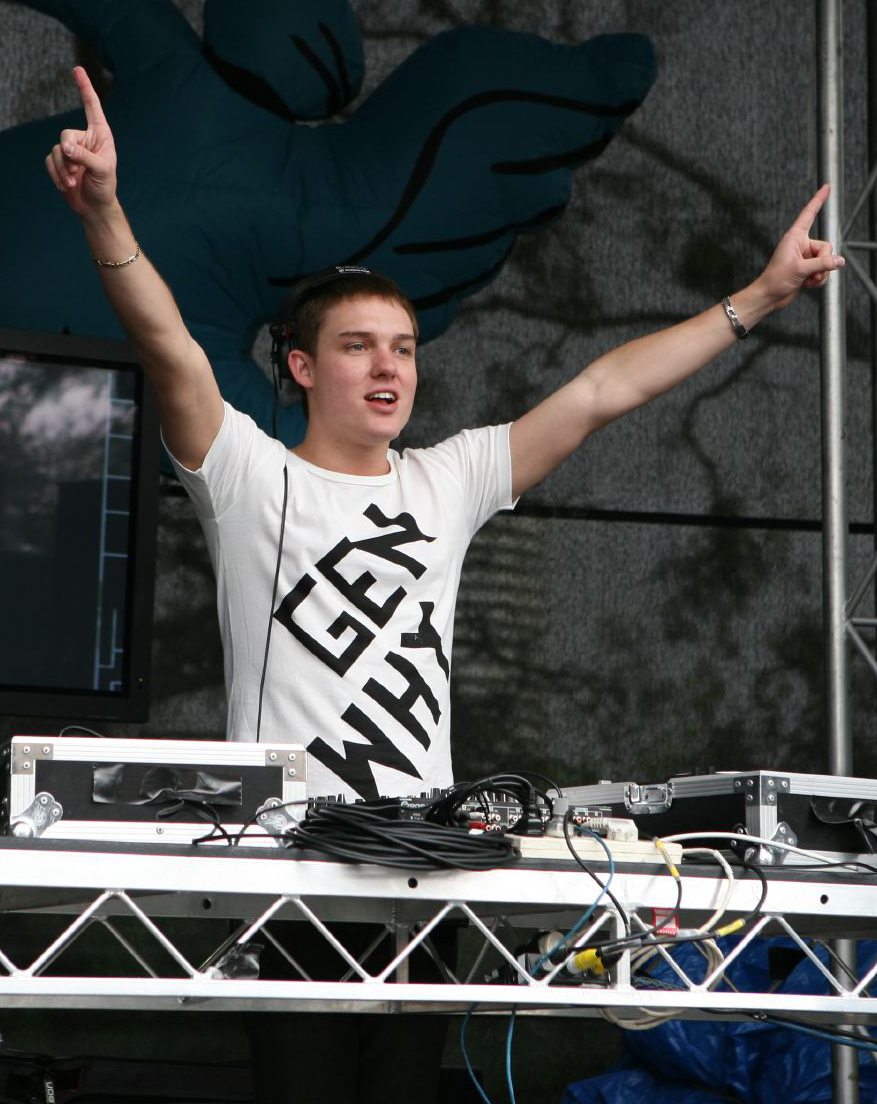
- tyDi performing at Global Gathering 2008

Background information
- Also known as: Wish I Was, Tyson Diorr
- Born: Tyson Illingworth; 31 May 1987 (age 39); Mooloolaba, Queensland, Australia
- Origin: Brisbane, Queensland, Australia
- Genres: EDM, trance, house
- Occupations: DJ, record producer, radio host of Dash Radio
- Years active: 2002–present
- Labels: Armada, Generationext, AVA, Stomp, Republic, Global Soundsystem
- Website: tyDi.com

tyDi (/ˈtaɪdi/; born Tyson Illingworth, 31 May 1987) is an Australian DJ and record producer specializing in electronic dance music. Originally from Queensland, tyDi was signed by Armin van Buuren's Armada label at the age of 17 and was ranked number 1 of Junkee's Australian Top 50 DJs in 2008 and 2009.

In 2009, tyDi released his first album, Look Closer, followed by his second album Shooting Stars in 2011. It reached number 1 on the iTunes Dance charts in Australia, Canada, Finland, and the UK, as well as number 4 in the USA. Between 2008 and 2012, tyDi was included in the annual DJ Mag Top 100 DJs poll, with his highest position being No. 48 in 2011. In October 2012, tyDi signed a worldwide publishing deal with Rondor/Universal Music and a record deal with Republic Records in April 2013. His third album, Hotel Rooms, was released on 22 November 2013.

tyDi's fourth album, Redefined, was released on 30 September 2014 and debuted at number 4 and number 5 on the iTunes Dance charts in the USA and Australia, respectively. Redefined, the title track on his third album, became the number one dance airplay record in the USA and also reached number 9 on the Billboard Dance/Mix Show Airplay Chart in April 2015. It was also named SiriusXM Electro No.1 song of 2015. His sixth album, Collide, a collaboration with Christopher Tin, was released on 9 March 2018.

== Life and career ==
=== Early years ===
Tyson Illingworth hails from Mooloolaba in Sunshine Coast, Queensland. At the age of 14, he became keen on dance music, particularly trance, and began DJing. His parents encouraged him to play an instrument, but he became interested in turntables and songwriting. He began participating in DJing competitions when he was 16. One competition misprinted his nickname "Tydi" as "tyDi", which led to the stylization of his stage name. tyDi graduated from Queensland Conservatorium of Music with a Bachelor of Music Technology.

In 2006, tyDi entered Junkee's Australian Top 50 DJs at number 12, and number 4 the following year. In 2008, he reached number 1, becoming the youngest person to top the chart.

=== 2009–2011: Look Closer and Shooting Stars ===
In 2009, tyDi released his debut album Look Closer, which reached number 2 in the Australian Dance Charts. The album featured 15 predominantly trance tracks. A review from Junkee's In The Mix stated, "Look Closer is an absolute belter of a debut, and displays a musical maturity way beyond tyDi's years." Electronic music website Trance.nu wrote that Look Closer was "of world class quality the likes of some of the best trance and progressive artist albums out there." A few months later, tyDi mixed a disc for the annual Ministry of Sound Trance Nation release and continued at number 1 for the 2009 Junkee DJ chart.

During 2009 and 2010, tyDi released singles, such as "You Walk Away" (featuring Audrey Gallagher), "Good Dream", "Vanilla" (featuring Tania Zygar and Audrey Gallagher) and the anthem "Half Light" (featuring Tania Zygar). In February 2010, he won "Best Break-Through DJ" at the International Dance Music Awards (IDMA), against Boys Noize, Chuckie, Joris Voorn and Super8 & Tab. On 16 April 2011, tyDi made his first appearance at the annual A State of Trance (ASOT) at Sydney's Acer Arena. He also appeared during ASOT 550 in Kyiv, Ukraine in 2012.

tyDi's second album, Shooting Stars, was released in August 2011. The album explored several genres of electronic music, unlike his trance-heavy debut album. It featured collaborations with vocalists such as Tania Zygar, Brianna Holan, Audrey Gallagher and DJ Rap. Talking Reviews said: "For want of a better description, this musical journey is nothing short of astounding and breath taking". Meanwhile, Beat Magazine said that the final track, "Ariana", "could be rated the best album outro of 2011." About half of the tracks have been released in extended club mixes or remixes. After the album release, tyDi continued touring, playing many shows a year in London, Macau, Sydney, and his hometown of Brisbane.

=== 2012–2014: Hotel Rooms, label change, and Redefined ===
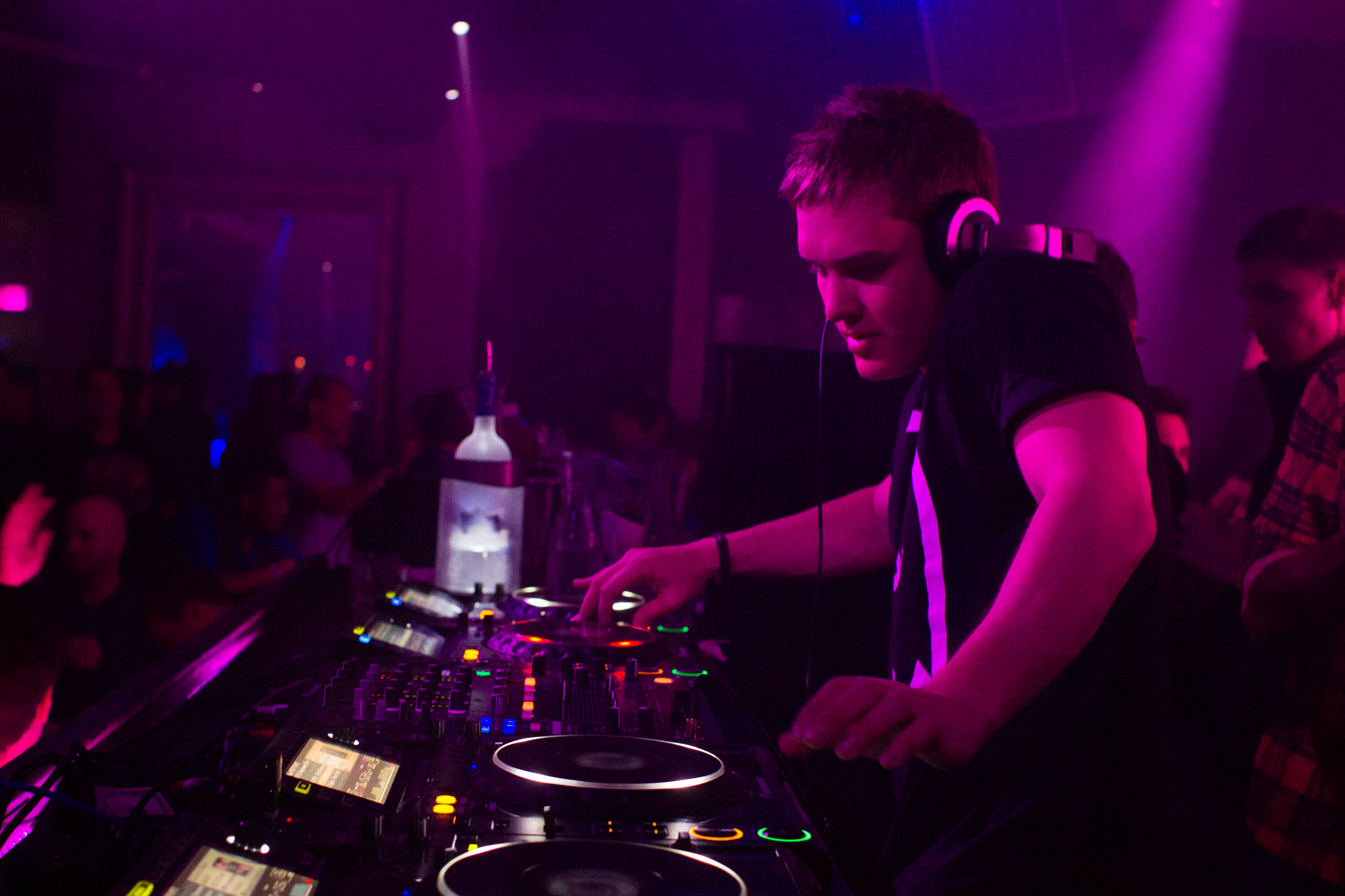
tyDi performing at Sutra in California, 2012

In October 2012, tyDi released Glow in the Dark, a collaboration with Ultra Records artist Kerli, which played on over ten Top 40 radio stations. The accompanying music video was premiered on Vevo and shown on MTV's Clubland. Later that month, he signed a worldwide publishing deal with Rondor/Universal Music.

In April 2013, tyDi signed his first major label record deal with Republic Records. His EP When I Go was released in January 2013, containing two trance tracks: a progressive house number and a chillout track, as well as multiple remixes.

tyDi's third album, a chillout album called Hotel Rooms, was released on 22 November 2013. He worked with American producer and DJ BT to collaborate on two tracks on BT's ninth album A Song Across Wires: "Tonight" (with JES) and "Stem the Tides" (with Tania Zygar). In August 2014, tyDi released "Stay" with Dia Frampton, the runner-up in The Voice's debut season.

tyDi's fourth album, Redefined, was released on 30 September 2014. The project features vocals by Chris Carrabba and Jordan Witzigreuter. The album reached number 5 on both the US and Australian iTunes dance charts on the day of its release. According to tyDi, Redefined represented a change in his approach to music creation, focusing more on songwriting rather than just hooks and rhythms. It took three years to write and produce, during which approximately 300 songs that were started were reduced to the final 20. The album was not genre-specific, with house, progressive house, pop-ish, trance and chillout tracks all making the final cut. The title track, Redefined, reached number one on the dance airplay charts in the US in April 2015. Following the making of the music video for the song, it was revealed that Redefined was the final piece in a planned sequence. The trilogy begins with Live This Lie and ends with Stay, but Redefined was the missing middle piece, completing the trilogy.

On 20 November 2014, tyDi announced that he had made a promise to all of his trance fans and would be producing an EP in time for Christmas, with all money being donated to children in need. The EP, titled "The Promise", was released on 14 December 2014. It features five trance tracks in his "old" style (circa 2008) and features solo tracks and collaborations with Audrey Gallagher, The Ready Set, Dennis Sheppard and Jennifer Rene.

=== 2015–present: Collide ===
On 18 September 2015, tyDi released his single "Tear Me Up", a pop track featuring vocalist Nash Overstreet, who is also the lead guitarist in the band Hot Chelle Rae. The track peaked at number 49 on the Dance/Electronic Billboard chart.

On 14 July 2015, TyDi revealed that a new artist that had appeared on SoundCloud early in 2015, was in fact his alter ego. According to the post, Wish I Was was his "darker" side. The post also suggested that Wish I Was came about because Tyson had entered an extended creative block when trying to write songs as tyDi. However, after writing about half the tracks that eventually came out on the debut Wish I Was EP, internet publications began to report on the producer. At first, they suggested it might be the work of Galantis, before tyDi eventually owned up to the project himself. On 6 May 2016, the first Wish I Was EP was released on iTunes, featuring 15 tracks.

Collide is TyDi's sixth feature album and is a collaboration with composer Christopher Tin. Released on 8 March 2018, it took 3 years to create, and featured 12 tracks. tyDi stated in July 2018 that he had been asked to work on some songs in the worldwide Disney on Ice production.

== Awards ==
In 2008 and 2009, tyDi earned the title of Number 1 DJ in the Sony InTheMix Top 50 Awards.

In February 2010, tyDi won the "Best Breakthrough DJ" award at the International Dance Music Awards.

In 2015, tyDi was awarded the Griffith University Young Outstanding Alumnus of the Year for his contributions to the music industry.

== Other ventures ==
In October 2015, tyDi appeared as a guest on the Herd Mentality Podcast with host Adam Reakes, to discuss his personal love of science, critical thinking in the music industry, and the hidden scientific meanings embedded in his song titles. tyDi revealed himself to be a proponent of secular scientific research, and a critic of homeopathic medicines and treatments.

=== Global Soundsystem Podcast ===
From November 2011 to June 2016, tyDi hosted a weekly radio show/podcast of world electronic dance music called Global Soundsystem. It hosted a total of 331 episodes. On 10 May 2012, the show was shortened from a two-hour to a one-hour format. It was syndicated to more than 30 countries weekly, and is still available for download via iTunes. Some episodes are also available on SoundCloud.

The 50th episode included many well-known DJs, including Paul Oakenfold, Judge Jules, Sasha, Sander Van Doorn and Markus Schulz. The 100th episode was special in a different way, with fans introducing all of the tracks.

== Discography ==
=== Studio albums ===
- Look Closer (2009) (EQ / Stomp)
- Shooting Stars (2011) (Armada)
- Global Soundsystem 2012: California (2012) (Armada)
- Hotel Rooms (2013) (Armada)
- Redefined (2014) (Global Soundsystem Records)
- Collide (2018) (Global Soundsystem Records)

=== Extended plays ===
- Never Seems So/Starcrossed (2007) (Trancetribe Recordings)
- Hide/Closer Than My Breath (2008) (AVA Recordings)
- When I Go (You Will Know) (2013) (S107 Recordings)
- The Promise (2014) (Global Soundsystem Records)
- The World Below (with Ian Urbina) (2020) (Synesthesia Media)

=== Singles ===
2006

- Familiar Streets (Mixology Digital Records)

2008

- Mind Games (Mazeman)
- Never Seems So / Starcrossed (Trancetribe Recordings)
- Russia (Armada Music)
- Fool (Armada Music)
- Under the Stars (Armada Music)
- Kopi Susu (Armada Music)
- Meet Me in Kyoto (Armada Music)

2009

- Somehow (featuring Dennis Sheperd featuring Marcie) (Armada Music)
- You Walk Away (featuring Audrey Gallagher) (Armada Music)
- Is it Cold? (Armada Music)
- Foolish (Armada Music)

2010

- Calling (featuring Audrey Gallagher) (Armada Music)
- Good Dream (Armada Music)
- Vanilla (featuring Tania Zygar) (Armada Music)
- Half Light (featuring Tania Zygar) (Armada Music)

2011

- Talking to Myself (featuring DJ Rap) (Armada Music)
- Acting Crazy (featuring Sarah Howells) (Armada Music)
- Never Go Back (featuring Brianna Holen) (Armada Music)
- Why Do I Care (featuring Tania Zygar) (Armada Music)

2012

- Loose Unit (with Richard Durand) (23 January)
- Sex, Lies and Still Oblivious (16 July) (Single + Remix pack)
- Jelly (Unreleased - DJ Mag Top 100 Voters Exclusive)
- Glow in the Dark (featuring Kerli) (22 October)
- Fire and Load (featuring Christina Novelli) (17 December) (Single + Remix Pack)

2013

- Nothing Really Matters (featuring Melanie Fontana) (9 April)
- Something About You (featuring Kerli) (30 July)
- Stem the Tides (with BT and Tania Zygar) (16 August)
- Tonight (with BT and JES) (16 August)
- Live this Lie (featuring Carmen Keigans) (11 November)

2014

- Stay (featuring Dia Frampton) (25 February)
- Redefined (featuring Melanie Fontana) (21 November)

2015

- If I Stayed (17 March)
- Tear Me Up (featuring Nash Overstreet) (18 September)

2016

- Only (featuring Olivia Somerlyn) (10 February)
- Oceans (with Jack Novak and Greyson Chance) (19 February)
- All I Ever Knew (featuring Cameron Walker) (20 May)
- For the First Time (featuring Michael Woolery) (9 July)
- Lost (featuring Asiahn) (12 August)
- Sharpest Weapon (with Morten featuring Cameron Walker) (16 December)

2017

- That's How You Know (with Col3man featuring Melanie Fontana) (3 March)
- Count on You (with Col3man featuring Jeremy Thurber) (26 May)
- Go for a Ride (featuring Luna) (as Wish I Was) (9 June)
- Beautiful War (featuring Lola Rhodes) (30 June)
- Closing In (with Christopher Tin featuring Dia Frampton) (13 October)
- Did you know? (with Christopher Tin featuring London Thor) (17 November)

2018

- You Don't Love Me (with Christopher Tin featuring Freesia) (26 January)
- Gold Blooded (with Christopher Tin featuring Dyson) (16 February)
- Please Stay (with Kundo featuring London Thor) (22 June)
- It Will Be Okay (featuring London Thor) (27 July)
- Let Go (featuring London Thor) (12 October)
- Say the Word (with JES) (7 December)

2019

- Fading (with Jes) (8 March)
- It's Always Now (with Matt Fax) (7 June)

2020

- I Wanna Believe (featuring Katie Sky) (13 March)
- Start Again (with Wish I Was featuring Breenley Brown) (22 May)
- Fool For You (30 October)

2021

- Feelin' Right (with Peytn and Bella Renee) (7 May)
- Tear Me Down (featuring Trey Rose) (27 August)

2022

- Just Believe (with Jes) (14 Jan)

=== Remixes ===
2007

- Andy Hunter featuring Christine Glass - Amazing (EMI)

2008

- D:Folt - I Come Running (Armada)

2009

- Re-ward and Dr. Willis - Maybe
- Beat Service and Tucandeo - Waiting for the Sun
- Nadia Ali - Fine Print
- 4 Strings - Take Me Away (with Dennis Shepard)
- Adam K & Soha - Long Distance (Generationext)
- Rank 1 - L.E.D. There Be Light (High Contrast Recordings) [with Trent McDermott]
- Yamin featuring Marcie - Forward Motion (Motion Music)
- Ashley Wallbridge featuring Meighan Nealon "My Blood" (Auryn Music)
- Topher Jones - Different Parts

2010

- Alex Bartlett - [No Title] (Released in 2011 as "Reflected" under the Fabio XB moniker)
- Reckless - Heaven's Scent (tyDi's Vicious ReWrite)
- Lentos - Forget About Us

2011

- BT featuring Jes - The Light in Things
- Vegas Baby featuring Angelic - For The Love of You
- Allure featuring Jes - Show Me the Way
- Fabio XB - Reflected

2012

- Tenishia and Jan Johnston - As It Should (4 June)
- Andain - Turn Up the Sound (20 June)
- Emma Hewitt - Rewind (20 July)
- Kerli - The Lucky Ones (6 November)

2013

- Cher - Woman's World (22 July)

2019

- Whiteroom - The Whiteroom (18 January)
- Rat City - Kind of Love (5 April)

2021

- Segiri - Undone (27 October)
