= Andy Moor (producer) =

English trance producer (born 1980)

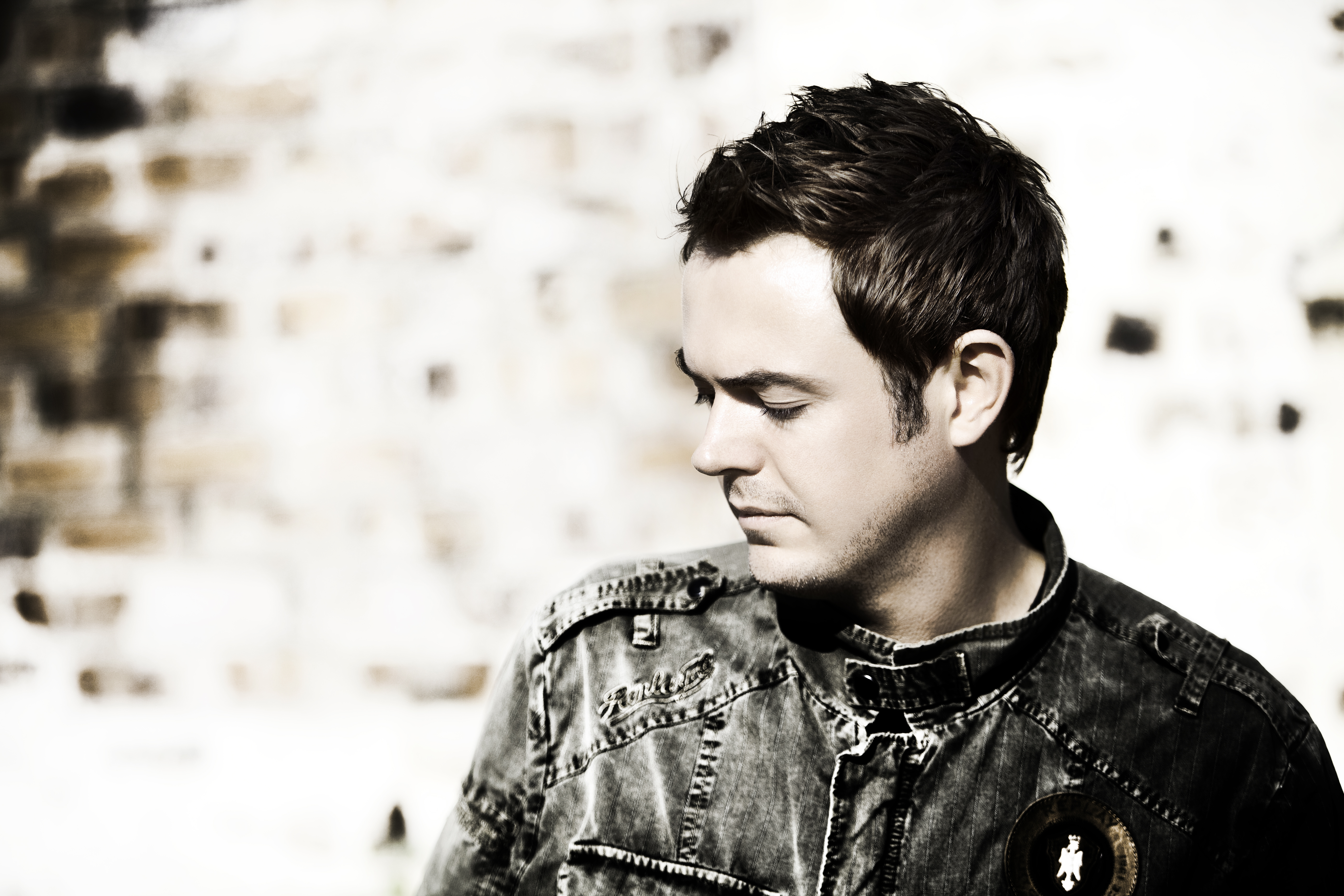
- Moor in 2009

Background information
- Also known as: Dub Disorder, Dwight van Man, Indigo
- Born: Andrew Beardmore; 16 January 1980 (age 46); Stoke-on-Trent, United Kingdom
- Genres: Trance, electronic
- Occupations: DJ, record producer, remixer
- Years active: 1999–present
- Label: AVA Recordings
- Website: www.andymoor.com

Andy Moor (born Andrew Beardmore; 16 January 1980) is an English trance DJ, producer and remixer. He used multiple aliases in the past and was part of many other acts such as Tilt, Whiteroom, Leama & Moor, and Zoo DJs.

Moor received several awards, including a Grammy Award nomination in December 2007, for his remix of Canadian artist Delerium with "Angelicus" featuring vocals from Isabel Bayrakdarian, ‘Best Dance Record,’ at the 2006 International Dance Music Awards at the Winter Music Conference in Miami and, ‘Best Trance Producer’ and ‘Best Trance Track’ at the ‘Trance Awards’" in 2004, ranked in the top 15 DJs in the world multiple times by DJ Mag.

== Early life ==
Andy Moor began playing piano at the age of 5 and could play six more instruments by the age of 10. Moor spun his first record at 13, signed his first label release at 19, by 21 was playing crowds of tens of thousands and at 25 owned his own record label AVA Recordings.

"When I was young I was encouraged to play musical instruments and started to play the piano; the recorder was compulsory at school, and then the Bassoon, so I developed an understanding of music theory from a young age. But my real passion was this electronic music that I was hearing, such as Jean Michelle Jarre etc. I was desperate to know how to make those synth sounds and as I grew older was frustrated by an M1 keyboard at school that nobody knew how to use, so I started to sequence that from an atari. By this time I was into early Sasha sets and other EDM music I was managing to get tapes of, so I started DJing using my friends equipment. After spending time sitting in a local studio, learning... it all went from there..."

== Career ==
=== Production career ===
In addition to his contributions under his own name, Moor worked as a producer for other names. Moor contributed to the UK trance act Tilt and resulted in the critically acclaimed album, Explorer.

He is one half of the trance act ‘Whiteroom’ with Adam White, whose title track was commended by Armin Van Buuren and Above & Beyond as the best trance production of 2004 and in 2005 picked up ‘Best Production’ and ‘Best Trance Track’ at the Trance Awards.

Moor collaborated in 2005 on Above & Beyond ‘Air For Life’, which was named 2005's ‘Tune Of The Year’ by listeners of Armin Van Buuren's radio show A State Of Trance, it won ‘Best Underground Dance Track’ at the Miami Winter Music Conference, and won ‘Best Trance Track’ in 2006.

Moor is also one half of UK melodic progressive house act, Leama & Moor, whose 2006 album ‘Common Ground’ included vocal contributions from Britney Spears and Avril Lavigne to Orbital, Tiesto, Brian Eno and Paul Oakenfold.

2009 saw the release of Breaking the Silence Vol. 1 on AVA/Armada.

Andy has mixed a variety of compilation series, such as ‘Trance Nation’ from Ministry of Sound, ASOT 500 and his own ‘Breaking the Silence’ series on AVA Recordings and was asked to host the legendary A State of Trance radio show on numerous occasions.

In July 2012, Andy Moor released a full-length debut solo artist album Zero Point One, which received positive reviews from DJ Mag and Mixmag. Zero Point One has 18 tracks, and features collaborations with vocalists Meredith Call, Carrie Skipper, Sue McLaren and Betsie Larkin as well as producers Orkidea and Ashley Wallbridge.

“I had been writing the album for many years, but as I was nearing the end, I decided to scrap the older tracks and start over with new ones,” says Andy. “So this version of the album contains tracks made in the last six months, despite the entire process taking years."

In September 2014 Andy Moor reunited with vocalist Betsie Larkin for a collaboration entitled ‘Not Afraid’, following their prior collaboration ‘Love Again’ on Zero Point One.

For the 100th release of his record label, AVA Recordings, Andy Moor collaborated with Somna and vocalist Amy Kirkpatrick to create ‘One Thing About You’, which topped the Beatport Trance Chart. Moor also released a signature Eco Mix of the track.

In 2015, Andy Moor collaborated with RAM and Christina Novelli on ‘All Gone,’ which was released on Armin Van Buuren’s Who’s Afraid Of 138?! label.

In 2016 Andy Moor released ‘Resurrection’.

=== DJ career ===
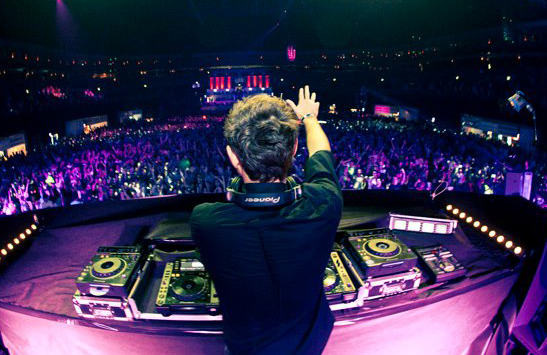
Andy Moor in 2010

Andy Moor has been touring since the age of 19 and has been ranked in the top 15 DJs in the world numerous times according to DJ mag. He has performed at hundreds of festivals worldwide, including Tomorrowland in Belgium, A State of Trance in Guatemala City, Southwest 4 in London and A State Of Trance in Utrecht.

"Don’t do it because you want to be “famous” or for reasons other than the love of the music. This love of music shows through in productions and performances, and with today's technology being so readily available it separates the run of the mill from the meaningful music." He allowed cameras to follow him on tour for his YouTube channel AndyMoorTV from 2009, creating an early version of today's VLOG

=== Moor Music ===
Moor Music is the name of Andy Moor's Podcast and Radio Show, aired on AfterHours.FM / AH.FM and Sirius XM Radio on every 2nd and 4th Wednesday of the month. Moor Music aired its milestone 250th episode in January 2020. Andy has hosted radio shows such as A State of Trance (filling in for Armin van Buuren) and featured as a guest artist in hundreds of other shows worldwide.

=== AVA Recordings ===
In early 2006, Andy Moor founded his own record label - AVA Recordings; curating a collection of high quality melodic electronic dance music, featuring artists such as Orkidea, Tritonal, Ashley Wallbridge, Lange, TyDi, Sunny Lax, Ben Nicky, Sean Tyas and RAM.

AVA has worked with aspiring producers, such as on the AVA NuBreed EP series. Some artists who have begun at AVA Recordings include Ashley Wallbridge, Mat Zo, tyDi, and Tritonal.

A quote from Andy Moor regarding AVA Recordings policy: "We will aim to sustain the same music policy, releasing quality, melodic, electronic dance music. We enjoy supporting new artists and working closely with them to develop and nurture their talent."

== Discography ==
=== Albums ===
Solo studio albums

- Zero Point One (2012)

Group studio albums

- 2004: Tilt – Explorer (Lost Language)
- 2005: Leama & Moor – Common Ground (Lost Language)

Remix albums

- 2013: Andy Moor – Zero Point One (The Remixes) (Armada Music)

=== Mix compilations ===
- 2009: Andy Moor – Breaking The Silence Vol. 1 (Armada Music)
- 2010: Ministry of Sound – Trance Nation (Mixed by Andy Moor) (Ministry of Sound)
- 2011: Andy Moor – Breaking The Silence Vol. 2 (Armada Music)
- 2011: A State of Trance 500 – 5CD Mix Compilation (Mixed by Armin van Buuren, Paul Oakenfold, Markus Schulz, Cosmic Gate, and Andy Moor) (Armada Music)
- 2014: Andy Moor – Breaking The Silence Vol. 3 (Armada Music)
- 2016: Andy Moor and Somna – AVA 10 Years: Past, Present & Future (Mixed and Compiled by Andy Moor and Somna) (Black Hole Recordings)
- 2018: Markus Schulz, Gabriel & Dresden and Andy Moor – In Search of Sunrise 14 (Songbird)

=== Selected singles and remixes ===
Pre-2000

- Various, uncredited releases on Baroque Records / Perfecto / Platipus

2000

- Andy Moor – Passenger (Baroque Records)
- Andy Moor – Violent City (Baroque Records)

2001

- Bill Hamel presents Innate and Andy Moor – Barotek (Sunkissed Records)
- Stripped Inc. – Glitterball [Method]
- Leama (Co-Production) – Melodica (Baroque Records)
- Leama (Co-Production) – Requiem for a Dream [Perfecto]
- Andy Moor pres : Sworn – Dark Amendments (Method Records)
- Medwey – Release (Andy Moor Remix) [Hooj]
- Coda – Take Me (Andy Moor Remix) [Decipher]
- Mark Shimmon vs. 3rd Degree – Dark Feelin' (Andy Moor Remix) [Tune Inn Records]
- Lewis and Moor – Byte (Intrinsic Records)

2002

- Leama (Co-Production) – Requim for a Dream (Perfecto)
- Andy Moor – Crazy Lady EP – No More (Baroque Records)
- Andy Moor – Crazy Lady EP – Athena (Baroque Records)
- Andy Moor – Crazy Lady EP – Celestial Waves (Baroque Records)
- Midnorth vs Austin Leeds – Soul Workout (Baroque Records)
- Indigo – Division (EQ Records)
- Odessi – Beyond the Sound (feat Maria Naylor) (Primal Beats)

2003

- Sonorous – Second Sun (Leama & Moor Remix) (Lost Language)
- Little Wonder – Eclipse (Leama & Moor Remix) (Lost Language)

2004

- Sworn – U Don't Feel (Vinyl Vice)
- Gill Norris – Forme (Leama & Moor Remix) [Precinct Recordings]
- Starkid – Crayons [Release Records]
- Leama & Moor – Shades of Blue/Red/Yellow (Primal Beats)
- Leama & Moor – Complex Synth Problems (Lost Language)
- Leama & Moor – Fact of the Matter (Lost Language)
- Tilt – The World Doesn't Know (Lost Language)
- Ridgewalkers featuring El – Find (Andy Moor Remix) (Baroque Records)
- Andy Moor And Adam White Present Whiteroom - The Whiteroom (Liquid Asset)

2005

- Whiteroom – Someday (featuring Amy Cooper) (Woom Recordings)
- Hidden Logic presents Luminary – My World (Andy Moor Remix) (Lost Language)
- Hidden Logic presents Luminary – Wasting (Andy Moor Remix) (Lost Language)
- Sonorous – Protonic (Leama & Moor Remix) (Euphonic)
- Tiësto – Tear in the Open (Leama & Moor Remix) (Nettwerk)
- Tiësto – Ur (Leama & Moor Remix) (Nettwerk)
- Tilt – Twelve (Lost Language)
- Tilt – New Day (Lost Language)
- Andy Moor – Halcyon (Armada Music)
- Above and Beyond presents Tranquility Base – Getting Away (Leama & Moor Remix) (Anjunabeats)
- Above and Beyond featuring Andy Moor – Air for Life (Anjunabeats)
- Britney Spears – Someday (Andy Moor Remix) (Jive Records)

2006

- Michael Wilson vs. Andy Moor – Control Me (Pangea Recordings)

2007

- Andy Moor vs. Orkidea – YearZero (AVA Recordings)
- Markus Schulz featuring Andy Moor – Daydream (Coldharbour Recordings)
- Tilt – Angry Skies (Tilt's Re-Activation remix) (Lost Language)
- Delerium – Angelicus (Andy Moor Remix) (Nettwerk)

2008

- Andy Moor – Fake Awake (Anjunabeats)
- tyDi – Hide (Andy Moor's Ecomix) (AVA Recordings)
- Andy Moor featuring Carrie Skipper – So Much More (AVA Recordings)

2009

- Nadia Ali – Love Story (Andy Moor Remix) [Direxion Entertainment]
- Andy Moor and Ashley Wallbridge featuring Meighan Nelon – Faces (AVA Recordings)
- Andy Moor vs. Lange (musician) – Stadium Four (AVA Recordings)

2010

- Delerium (band) – Send Me An Angel (Andy Moor Remix) (Nettwerk)
- Andy Moor featuring Carrie Skipper – She Moves (AVA Recordings)
- Hybrid – Disappear Here [Distinctive]

2011

- Signalrunners featuring Julie Thompson – These Shoulders (Andy Moor Remix) (Anjunabeats)
- Vangelis – Rachel's Song (Andy Moor Remix) [CDR]
- Above and Beyond featuring Andy Moor – Air for Life (Andy Moor's 2011 Remodel) [CDR]
- Andy Moor vs. Mike – Spirits Pulse (AVA Recordings)
- BT (musician) – Always (Andy Moor Remix) (Nettwerk)
- Armin van Buuren – I Don't Own You (Andy Moor Remix) (Armada Music)
- Andy Moor featuring Sue McLaren – Fight The Fire (AVA Recordings)
- Lange featuring Sarah Howells – Let It All Out (Andy Moor Remix) [Lange Recordings]

2012

- Andy Moor and Ashley Wallbridge featuring Gabriela – World To Turn (AVA Recordings)
- Andy Moor featuring Jessica Sweetman – In Your Arms (AVA Recordings)
- Andy Moor – K Ta (AVA Recordings)
- Andy Moor featuring Sue McLaren – Trespass (AVA Recordings)

2013

- Andy Moor – I Be (AVA Recordings)
- Andy Moor and Betsie Larkin – Love Again (AVA Recordings)

2014

- Andy Moor – Fade to Light (AVA Recordings)
- Betsie Larkin and Andy Moor - Not Afraid (AVA Recordings)
- The Thrillseekers - This Is All We Have (Andy Moor Remix)
- Andy Moor and Lange featuring Fenja - Top Of The World (Lange Recordings)

2015

- Andy Moor and Somna featuring Amy Kirkpatrick - One Thing About You (Ava Recordings)
- Andy Moor and RAM featuring Christina Novelli - All Gone (RAM Uplifting Mix) (Who's Afraid Of 138?!)

2016

- Andy Moor - Resurrection (Ava Recordings)
- Andy Moor featuring Michele C - We Can Be Free (Ava Recordings)
- Andy Moor and Somna - Look Back (AVA Recordings)

2017

- Andy Moor and Somna - There is Light (Ava Recordings)
- Andy Moor and Ashley Wallbridge - Faceoff (Armada)
- Andy Moor and Lange presents Stadium4 - Unity (Armada)

2018

- First State featuring Sarah Howells - Brave (Andy Moor Remix) (Black Hole Recordings)
- Markus Schulz and Andy Moor featuring Adina Butar - Wild Dream (Coldharbour Recordings)
- Andy Moor featuring Becky Jean Williams - The Real You (Ava Recordings)
- Andy Moor and Alex Ryan - Reflection (Future Sound of Egypt)
- Andy Moor and Somna featuring Monika Santucci - Free Fall (Ava Recordings)

2019

- Andy Moor, Somna and Blü Eyes - Up In Smoke (Ava Recordings)

2020

- Andy Moor, Somna and Blü Eyes - Up In Smoke (Andy Moor Remix) (Ava Recordings)
- Lange and Andy Moor present Stadium4 - Hybrid Origin (Armada Music)
- Jes - Two Souls (Andy Moor Remix) (Magik Muzik)

2021

- Andy Moor, Somna, and Linney - More Than Love (Ava Recordings)
- Andy Moor - Safe On Both Sides (Enhanced Progressive)

2022

- Andy Moor and Somna featuring Natalie Major - Born to Run (Ava Recordings)
