= Zero Point One =

Studio album by Andy Moor
- Released: July 6, 2012
- Recorded: 2012
- Genre: Trance; Progressive Trance; Electronic; Ambient
- Label: Armada Music
- Producer: Andy Moor

Singles from Zero Point One
- 1. "World To Turn" Released: April 30, 2012; 2. "In Your Arms" Released: June 18, 2012; 3. "K Ta" Released: August 13, 2012; 4. "Trespass" Released: October 15, 2012; 5. "Love Again" Released: February 25, 2013

Zero Point One is the debut full-length studio album by progressive trance producer, remixer, and DJ Andy Moor which was released on July 6, 2012, on Armada Music.

== Track listing ==
No.	Title	Length
1.	"Atmospherica"	2:37
2.	"November Morning"	3:15
3.	"Please Forgive Me" (featuring Nicole McKenna)	4:02
4.	"Undeserved" (featuring Meredith Call)	4:02
5.	"Ordinary People" (with Daniel Paul Davis)	5:32
6.	"World To Turn" (with Ashley Wallbridge) (featuring Gabriela)	4:29
7.	"Love Again" (with Betsie Larkin)	6:34
8.	"Elysian Fields" (featuring Carrie Skipper)	4:59
9.	"Trespass" (featuring Sue McLaren)	6:07
10.	"Leave Your World Behind" (featuring Hysteria!)	3:50
11.	"In Your Arms" (featuring Jessica Sweetman)	3:59
12.	"Orbithing" (with Orkidea)	5:34
13.	"Tora's Angel" (featuring Carrie Skipper)	4:00
14.	"Story Of My Life" (featuring Carrie Skipper)	6:00
15.	"Don't Sound The Alarm" (featuring Jeza)	3:55
16.	"K Ta"	4:17
17.	"Time Will Tell" (featuring Stine Grove)	5:57
18.	"Turning Me On" (featuring Slimmie)	4:44
