= Common Ground (Leama & Moor album) =

Studio album by Leama & Moor
- Released: 5 June 2006
- Genre: Electronic, ambient, trance
- Length: 66:28
- Label: Lost Language, Tirade Records
- Producer: Martin Smith (Leama), Andy Beardmore (Andy Moor)

Professional ratings
Review scores
Source	Rating
Progressive-Sounds	4.5/5 stars
Trance.nu	4/5 stars

Common Ground is the debut artist album written and produced by British trance duo Leama & Moor released on Lost Language and Tirade Records in 2006. The album is a continuously mixed artist set that takes the listener on a journey through ambient soundscapes and cinematic textures, acoustic rock, house, breaks, and trance music. It has also featured vocalists Jan Johnston and Ashley Tomberlin (from Luminary) and a duo project called Rushmore.

Jan Johnston did vocals for the song "Waiting" and Ashley Tomberlin contributed vocals to "Everything Matters", as she mentioned it on her MySpace profile in her blog..

Rushmore, who had collaborated with Leama & Moor on "Distance Between Us" returns and offered vocals on the acoustic rock/ambient fused track "Cry For Help".

The actual CD is a mixed album, but it is also sold on Beatport and the iTunes Music Store as unmixed songs for the digital album sale. The iTunes version, however, has some of the song files a little messed up with CD skipping in the songs.

The lead single "Everything Matters" remixed by Matthew Dekay is featured on Tiësto's In Search of Sunrise 5: Los Angeles.

== Track listing ==
1. "Waterdrop"
2. "Hillside Climb"
3. "Coming Of Age"
4. "Neon Approach"
5. "Everything Matters" (featuring Ashley Tomberlin (uncredited))
6. "Forever"
7. "New Division"
8. "Cry For Help" (featuring Rushmore)
9. "Calling"
10. "Waiting" (featuring Jan Johnston)
11. "Communications"
