= Turnin' Me On =

Turnin' Me On may refer to:

- "Turnin Me On", a 2009 song by Keri Hilson
- "Turnin' Me On" (Nina Sky song), 2005
- "Turnin' Me On" (Blake Shelton song), 2018

== See also ==
- Turning Me On (disambiguation)
