= Frankie DeCarlos =

American singer-songwriter (born 1976)

- Born: Frankie DeCarlos Patrick; July 14, 1976 (age 50); Memphis, TN., US
- Genres: R&B, Soul
- Occupations: Singer-songwriter, composer, musician, record producer, businessman
- Instruments: Vocals, keyboards, organ, drums, guitar, synthesizers, piano
- Years active: 2004–present
- Label: Chispa Music Group
- Website: www.frankiedecarlosmusic.com

Frankie DeCarlos Patrick (born July 14, 1976), known professionally as Frankie DeCarlos, is an American singer-songwriter, record producer, musician, and entrepreneur. His latest and most popular album 9 was released April 9, 2013.

== Early life ==
Frankie DeCarlos Patrick was born on July 14, 1976, at General Hospital in Somerville, TN a small town outside of Memphis, TN. As a child, he was raised in Memphis, Orange Mound, an African-American neighborhood in the United States. Growing up in a gospel and soul music environment, Frankie DeCarlos learned to sing, play instruments, and minister. He became an ordained Baptist minister at the age of 15. After relocating to Atlanta, Georgia in December 2002, Frankie DeCarlos started cultivating his musical skills in the R&B/Soul genres.

== Career ==
Frankie DeCarlos began his career singing gospel with his sister, Angela, and cousin, Tomeka in a children's group called The Patrick Singers. He and his father later founded a gospel group called Frankie & Divine. In 2007, Frankie DeCarlos recorded his first secular album Human Man which was released by Lepo Entertainment and Chispa Music Group. On July 3, 2007, Frankie DeCarlos started the Human Man promotional tour by performing in his hometown Memphis, TN. at the Gibson Guitar Showcase Lounge. Soon after the release of Human Man, the album reached #1 in the Soul Digger Hot 10 Black Music Review magazine. The follow-up album, Frankie DeCarlos was released in 2008.

=== EMPIRE ===
After taking a two-year break from recording, FDC released his third commercial Indie album, EMPIRE, on June 14, 2011. EMPIRE was recorded in Georgia during the winter of 2010 and mixed in Los Angeles, California by Ken Townsend, founder of the New Genesis Band. EMPIRE was produced by Frankie DeCarlos and Torian Eddie of Beat Boyz. Many of the records were written or co-written by Frankie DeCarlos and Dubois Johnson. The additional credited songwriters are Vernell Thomas, JC Durrah, Calvin Bonds, Jade Woodall, and Jermaine Jordan. EMPIRE Special Edition was released October 25, 2011, including new photos and three bonus instrumental tracks. "Close To You" was featured on Europe's top soul & urban radio station, Solar Radio.

== Discography ==
=== Studio albums ===
- Human Man (2007)
- Frankie DeCarlos (2008)
- EMPIRE (2011)
- 9 (2013)

=== Singles ===
- "Sex Appeal" (2011)
- "My Queen" (2013)
