= Empire (Frankie DeCarlos album) =

EMPIRE

Studio album by Frankie DeCarlos
- Released: June 14, 2011
- Recorded: 2010
- Length: 43:23
- Label: Chipsa Music Group
- Producers: Frankie DeCarlos, DuBois Johnson, Torrian Eddie

Frankie DeCarlos chronology
Frankie DeCarlos (2008)	EMPIRE (2011)	9 (2013)

Special Edition cover
- Released October 25, 2011

Singles from EMPIRE
- 1. "Sex Appeal" Released: 2011; 2. "Close to You" Released: 2011; 3. "Summer Break" Released: 2012

EMPIRE is the third studio album by American recording artist Frankie DeCarlos.

== Track listing ==
No.	Title	Writer(s)	Producer(s)	Length
1.	"I'll Play the Fool"	Frankie Patrick	Frankie Patrick	4:10
2.	"Summer Break"	Dubois Johnson, Frankie Patrick	Torian Eddie, Frankie Patrick, Eric Shorter	3:01
3.	"I Tried"	Frankie Patrick	Torian Eddie, Frankie Patrick	4:29
4.	"Sex Appeal"	Frankie Patrick, Vernell Thomas	Torian Eddie, Frankie Patrick	4:30
5.	"Close to You"	Frankie Patrick, Dubois Johnson	Frankie Patrick, Torian Eddie	3:40
6.	"She Got My Back" (featuring Wildkingdom)	Frankie Patrick, Jermaine Jordan, Jade Woodall	Torian Eddie, Frankie Patrick	3:23
7.	"Perfect"	Dubois Johnson	Frankie Patrick	3:25
8.	"I Love You Already"	Frankie Patrick, Dubois Johnson	Frankie Patrick	3:10
9.	"Alright"	Dubois Johnson, Frankie Patrick	Torian Eddie, Frankie Patrick, Jermaine Jordan	4:50
10.	"All Night Long"	Dubois Johnson, Frankie Patrick, Vernell Thomas	Torian Eddie, Troy Lynch, Frankie Patrick	4:17
11.	"Loves Empire"	Frankie Patrick, Calvin Bonds, James Durrah	Frankie Patrick, Torian Eddie, Aaron Foster	4:28
Total length:				43:23

Special edition bonus tracks
No.	Title	Producer(s)	Length
12.	"Sex Appeal (instrumental)"	Torian Eddie, Frankie Patrick	4:30
13.	"Close to You (Instrumental)"	Torian Eddie, Frankie Patrick	3:40
14.	"Summer Break (Instrumental)"	Torian Eddie, Frankie Patrick, Eric Shorter	3:01
Total length:			54:34
