= Keenan Cahill =

American Internet personality (1995–2022)

- Born: March 20, 1995; Elmhurst, Illinois, U.S.
- Died: December 29, 2022 (aged 27); Chicago, Illinois, U.S.
- Occupation: YouTuber

Keenan Cahill (March 20, 1995 – December 29, 2022) was an American YouTuber and Internet celebrity who gained fame in the early 2010s for his viral videos in which he lip synced to popular songs. He went on to become a singer-songwriter and also did video collaborations with various other well known celebrities.

Cahill launched his first lipsynced YouTube video on August 28, 2010, on the Katy Perry song "Teenage Dream". Guest artists on his channel included Jennifer Aniston, 50 Cent, Flo Rida, Katy Perry, Tinie Tempah, Maroon 5, Cody Simpson, Jason Derulo, Big Time Rush, Glee, The Wanted, LMFAO, Drake Bell, Justin Bieber, Gym Class Heroes, Xuso Jones, WWE wrestler The Miz, and Pauly D. He released two EPs and over a dozen singles on iTunes.

== Early life ==
Cahill was born in 1995 in Elmhurst, Illinois. He was diagnosed at the age of one with Maroteaux–Lamy syndrome, which in his case resulted in developing an appearance much like that of people with dwarfism; Cahill was 127 centimetres (50 in), with thickening of the dura, shortened trunk, crouched stance, restricted joint movement, and enlarged hands. Cahill was treated with a bone marrow transplant in 1997 to slow down the progression of the disease, and he had multiple surgeries, including surgery to relieve intracranial pressure.

== Career ==
=== 2011 ===
In March, at a Danish award show, TV 2 Zulu Awards 2011, Cahill performed in a video where he was lip-synching the songs which were nominated for the Hit of the Year award. In April, he appeared with Brian Wilson and Cody Ross of the San Francisco Giants performing Taio Cruz's hit "Dynamite". During her California Dreams Tour, Katy Perry met Keenan and they performed "Teenage Dream" together in a video. Cahill was nominated for Viral Web Star at the J-14 Awards in September. In the fall, he performed in a music video with The Oak Ridge Boys for their song "What'cha Gonna Do". A one-hour documentary about Cahill aired on NT1 in France, Belgium and Switzerland.

=== 2012–2022 ===
Cahill released 18 singles and two EPs through iTunes.

== Death ==
Cahill died at age 27 on December 29, 2022, following open-heart surgery on December 15.

== Discography ==
=== EPs ===
- Hands Up (The Dance Remixes) (feat. ElectroVamp) (Augmenter Publishing Group, April 2012)
- Closer (The Remixes) (feat. SHY & DRS) (Augmenter Music Group / PressPlay, February 2014)

=== Singles ===
- "Hands Up" (feat. ElectroVamp) (Augmenter Publishing Group, July 2012)
- "Closer" (feat. SHY & DRS) (Augmenter Music Group / PressPlay, November 2013)
- "Back to Us" (feat. Lovey James) (PressPlay, March 2014)
- "Till Morning Comes" (feat. Kristina Antuna) (Keenan Cahill, May 2017)
