= Christina Novelli =

British musician and DJ

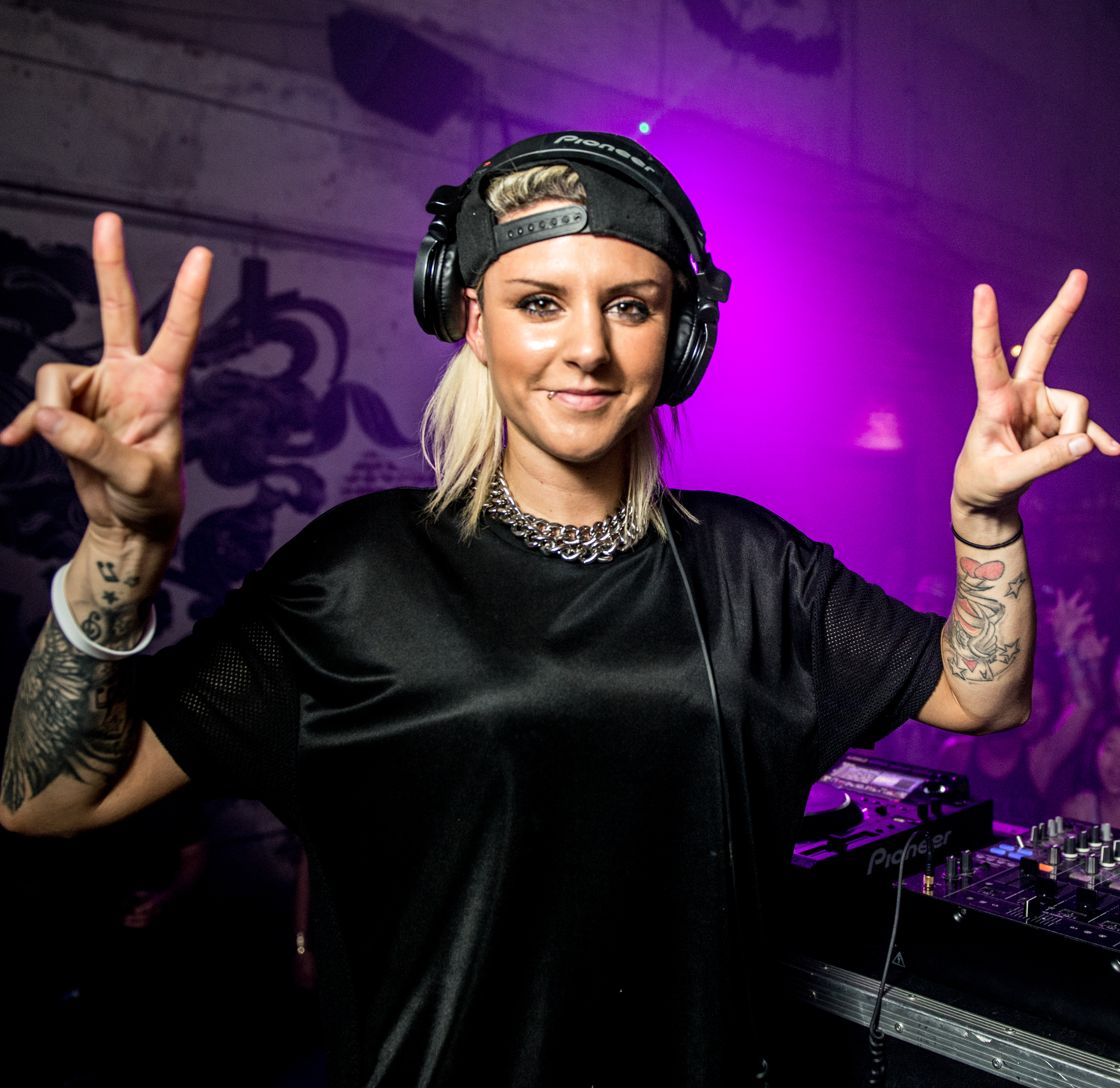
- Novelli performing for an Odin Works event at Nextdoor in Honolulu, Hawaii, 2014

Background information
- Born: Christina Monique Novelli; 27 November 1986 (age 39); Southampton, England
- Genres: EDM, house, electronic dance, trance, acoustic
- Occupations: Singer-songwriter, DJ
- Instruments: Vocals, guitar, drums, production
- Years active: 2012–present
- Labels: Atlantic, Warner Music, Big beat, Rising/Nervous, Maelstrom/Black Hole, Aropa/Armada, Euphonic, Garuda, Dance Therapy, Tone Diary, Ultra
- Spouse: Tara Sirrell (m. 2019)
- Website: musemusicmanagement.com

Christina Novelli (born 27 November 1986) is an English DJ, vocalist and songwriter who resides in London. She is the daughter of Jean-Christophe Novelli, a French celebrity chef.

== Career ==
=== Early career ===
At the age of 17, influenced by the music of Motown, Johnny Cash, Elvis, Tina Turner, Lauryn Hill, Novelli started fronting her own bands.

In 2011, Novelli starred in a reality TV series on Channel 5 called Candy Bar Girls, which covered the lives and loves of the staff and regulars at the Candy Bar in London's Soho. While on the show, Novelli could be seen performing a mix of her own material along with some covers, making them her own. Some of the songs she sang were Goo Goo Dolls' "Iris", Damien Rice's "Cannonball", and Bruno Mars' "Just the Way You Are".

=== 2012–2013: Breakthrough ===
In early 2012, Novelli collaborated with producer and DJ Gareth Emery on the track "Concrete Angel", which she had co-written. By June of the same year, "Concrete Angel" had entered Billboard at No. 15 on the "Dance Music" charts, and as of April, 2023 the hit has over 65 million views on YouTube. Since then, Novelli has also collaborated with the likes of Dash Berlin, Armin van Buuren, Ben Nicky, Darren Styles, Paul Oakenfold, SASH!, Markus Schulz, tyDi, Judge Jules and many more. In December 2013, she collaborated with Justin Caruso and Dave Audé on the song "Satellite", debuted as the No. 47 Dance Club Song in Billboard.

=== 2013–present: DJ career ===
In 2013, Novelli began performing as a DJ at venues and festivals worldwide, including Marquee Club in Las Vegas, LIV in Miami, Pacha in New York City, as well as in major events such as Ultra Music Festival and Creamfields. Although primarily associated with trance, she also mixes across several house music genres, including tech house, big room house, hard house, bass house, and progressive house.

== Personal life ==
Novelli married Tara Sirrell in 2019.

In 2015, Novelli was involved in a serious car accident, involving a truck that rammed into the car that she was a passenger of. It resulted into the car rolling multiple times, finally ending up in a ditch. She endured minor injuries of the spine, chest and head. It was reported that the seatbelt she was wearing saved her life.

== Discography ==
As lead artist

- 2015: Christina Novelli – "Same Stars"
- 2016: Christina Novelli – "Where We Began"
- 2017: Christina Novelli and Decoy! – "In Da Club"
- 2018: Christina Novelli and Atilla Syah – "This Is the Sound"
- 2019: Christina Novelli – "Beautiful Life"
- 2019: Christina Novelli – "It'll End in Tears"
- 2019: Christina Novelli – "Through My Eyes" – The Acoustic Sessions Vol. 1
- 2019: Christina Novelli & Sub Zero Project - “The Contagion”
- 2020: Super8 & Tab and Christina Novelli – "Rooftops"
- 2020: Christina Novelli – "I'm Ok"
- 2020: Christina Novelli – "Numb"
- 2021: Markus Schulz and Christina Novelli - "Not Afraid to Fall"
- 2021: Christina Novell and Chris Burke - "Don't Wanna Go Home"
- 2021: Christina Novell and Leroy Moreno - "In My Arms"
- 2021: Christina Novelli and Cquenz - "All I Want Is You"

As featured artist

- 2012: Gareth Emery (featuring Christina Novelli) – "Concrete Angel"
- 2012: tyDi (featuring Christina Novelli) – "Fire & Load"
- 2013: Craig Connelly and Christina Novelli – "Black Hole"
- 2013: Dash Berlin (featuring Christina Novelli) – "Jar of Hearts"
- 2013: Judge Jules (featuring Christina Novelli) – "Collide"
- 2013: Easton and Christina Novelli – "Already Gone"
- 2013: Justin Caruso and Audé (featuring Christina Novelli) – "Satellite"
- 2014: Roman Messer (featuring Christina Novelli) – "Frozen"
- 2014: Fabio XB and Liuck (featuring Christina Novelli) – "Back to You"
- 2014: Binary Finary and Lele Troniq (featuring Christina Novelli) – "Waiting for the Sun (Remixed)"
- 2014: LTN (featuring Christina Novelli) – "Feeling Like Yeah"
- 2014: Gareth Emery (featuring Christina Novelli) – "Dynamite"
- 2014: JJoy and Christina Novelli – "Loving You"
- 2014: Eddie Bitar (featuring Christina Novelli) – "Start Again"
- 2014: Nomosk and Roman Messer (featuring Christina Novelli) – "Lost Soul"
- 2014: Tasadi and Aryas (featuring Christina Novelli) – "Seventh Kingdom"
- 2014: Ørjan Nilsen (featuring Christina Novelli) – "Hurricane"
- 2014: Delta-S and Christina Novelli – "Alive"
- 2014: Ben Gold (featuring Christina Novelli) – "All or Nothing"
- 2014: Teevo Rain and Nova Kordz (featuring Christina Novelli) – "ARMOUR"
- 2014: SHY & DRS (featuring Christina Novelli) – "Born Again"
- 2015: Fabio XB and Liuck featuring Christina Novelli – "Step into the Light"
- 2015: MaRLo featuring Christina Novelli – "Hold It Together"
- 2015: Dennis Sheperd featuring Christina Novelli – "Starlight"
- 2015: LTN featuring Christina Novelli – "Hold on to Your Heart" (LTN's Sunrise Album Mix) / LTN featuring Christina Novelli – "Hold on to Your Heart" (LTN's Sunrise Mix)
- 2015: Andy Moor, RAM and Christina Novelli – "All Gone"
- 2015: Sneijder featuring Christina Novelli – "Love of My Control [FSOE]"
- 2015: Iván Mateluna featuring Christina Novelli – "Not Alone" (Ultra/Kontor/Abstractive Music)
- 2016: Luke Bond and Cartel – "Once More"
- 2016: Christina Novelli and Lanos – "Home"
- 2016: Gareth Emery and Christina Novelli – "Save Me"
- 2016: Bryan Kearney and Christina Novelli – "By My Side"
- 2016: Darren Styles and Christina Novelli – "Sun Is Rising"
- 2016: Van Dresen, Akki and Monteur featuring Christina Novelli – "Beautiful"
- 2018: Bobina and Christina Novelli – "Mysterious Times"
- 2018: Roman Messer featuring Christina Novelli – "Fireflies"
- 2018: Richard Durand and Christina Novelli – "The Air I Breathe"
- 2018: Osmia and Christina Novelli – "Be Without You"
- 2019: Markus Schulz and Christina Novelli – "Symphony of Stars"
- 2019: Sub Zero Project and Christina Novelli – "The Contagion"
- 2019: Richard Durand and Christina Novelli – "Save You"
- 2019: Allen Watts and Christina Novelli – "My Gravity"
- 2020: Markus Schulz and Christina Novelli – "Not Afraid to Fall"
- 2021: Christina Novelli and Richard Durand - "My Guiding Light"
- 2021: Sash! featuring Christina Novelli - "Walking the Wire"
- 2022: DRYM, GXD, Christina Novelli - "Saving Grace"

== Awards and nominations ==
- Christina Novelli and Gareth Emery's song "Concrete Angel" was nominated for the 28th Annual International Dance Music Awards for "Best Trance Track" of 2013.
- Christina Novelli and Richard Durand's song "The Air I Breathe" was voted Tune of the Year 2018 on Armin van Buuren's A State of Trance.
- Christina Novelli won "Best Female Trance Artist" two years in a row (2019 and 2020) at the Annual International Dance Music Awards Winter Music Conference.
