= Nae Danger =

Scottish energy drink brand

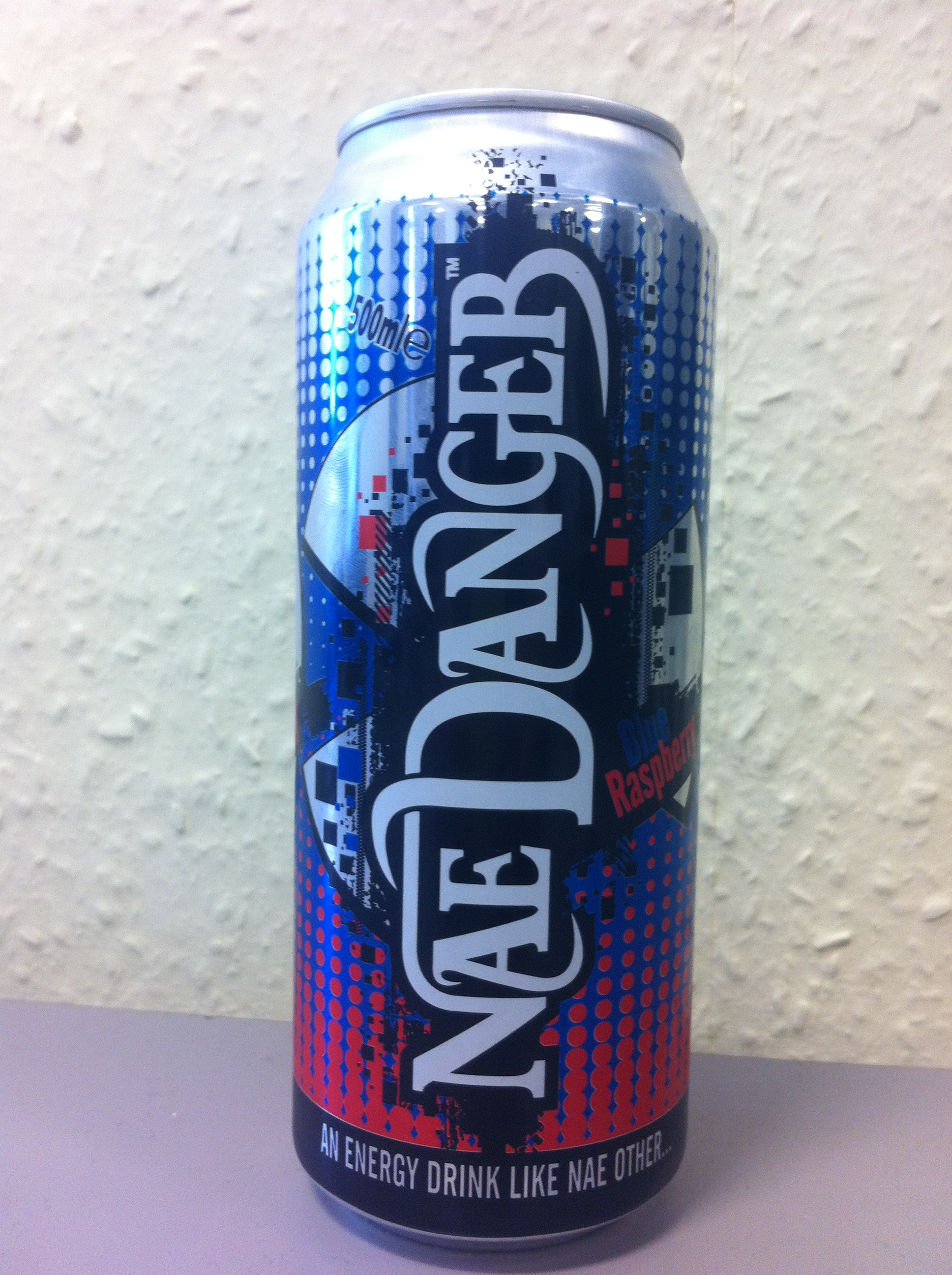
- Type: Energy drink
- Manufacturer: Nae Danger
- Origin: Scotland
- Introduced: August 2012
- Variants: Blue Raspberry, Blue Raspberry (Nae Sugar), Red Blueberry, Original Energy, Sport Blue Raspberry, Sport Orange
- Website: www.nae-danger.co.uk

Nae Danger was an energy drink from Scotland. It is claimed to be the first and only carbonated energy drink to have been created, branded and manufactured in Scotland, which is contested with IrnBru32 which was released in 2006 by A.G. Barr. Released in August 2012, the drink is a creation of Ross Gourlay, a Scottish entrepreneur from Bishopbriggs. Gourlay hoped to gain a slice of the growing caffeinated drinks market and also encourage recognisable Scottish brands within the UK. There are two main flavours: Blue Raspberry and Red Blueberry.

The can design includes the words "Nae Danger", a popular Scottish phrase equivalent to the Australian "no worries", spanning the length of the can. The can also states that it's "an energy drink like nae other" and "it's only a quid", endorsing the Scottish theme of the product. The company is a new addition to the energy drink market which is worth over £790 million in the UK having risen 17% between 2012 and 2013. The drink competes with other highly caffeinated energy products such as Relentless, Monster, Rockstar and Red Bull. Nae Danger has culminated an assortment of 6 drinks since its released in mid-2012. The Nae Danger company was dissolved on 9 May 2017.

== Brand ==
The product name was initially brought up by Ross Gourlay while joking with friends. However, Gourlay had seen the potential in such a product name and believed he could compete with the market leaders, while entering the Scottish market through a quirky brand name. The saying "Nae Danger" is a commonly known south-western Scottish regional dialect for "No Problem" and this features on the can as well as other phrases such as "Aye.. Ye Cannae Whack It". The drink prides itself on being "only a quid", meaning that every can is £1 to purchase. Gourlay, is a director of Glencrest Ltd.

== Products ==
=== Flavours ===
Nae Danger comes in four different flavours. The original flavours were Blue Raspberry and Red Blueberry and these came in 500ml cans. The company then went on to create an original energy drink which conforms to traditional energy drink flavour. There was also a "Nae Sugar" (No Sugar) version of Blue Raspberry released which had the same flavour as the standard Blue Raspberry. The company then went on to release two sports drinks, again with the flavour Blue Raspberry and a new addition of Orange.

== Advertising and sponsorship ==
Nae Danger mainly advertises through social media and promotional campaigns in Universities. As well as this, they backed up their marketing with radio advertisement and new media work campaigns on Facebook and Twitter. This is mostly where they interact with fans of the drink, as well as advertising their product and events. Nae Danger also sponsor talented Scots to market their product. The fields that they sponsor range from go-karting, skiing and skateboarding. They also sponsor Fiona Wallace who races in the Mini Super Cup which is a small racing competition held in Britain. This event is a feature race at British Touring Car Championship (BTCC) events. The company sponsored the 2013 National Skiathon organised by Disability Snowsport UK that aims to provide facilities for those with disabilities to be able to enjoy Snow sports.

== Market ==
=== Distribution ===
The products are mainly aimed at the Scottish market, however the company branched out of Scotland with a release of the product in English retail outlets in Yorkshire, Manchester, Liverpool, Birmingham and even London through Nisa Local stores. Stores and outlets that stock Nae Danger in Scotland include Spar who began stocking the product in 2012 and Aldi who is the most recent addition to Nae Danger stockists. Aldi started stocking the product in its stores as of mid-October 2013, other stockists are lesser known convenience stores throughout Scotland such as Semichem and KeyStore. The cans themselves are distributed by Glencrest Ltd, A company owned by Gourlay and his brother.

=== Deal with Spar ===
Nae Danger came to an agreement with Spar to stock their products in 2012. Ross Gourlay described the deal as a "major coup" for the brand as this was the first serious deal for his company. Spar own 12,500 stores worldwide mostly within Europe. A deal with Scottish Spar has meant that 15,000 cans were supplied to shops across the country. Nae Danger had already sold over half a million cans through independent retailers in only a few short months before they struck a deal with a major retailer.
