= Ashley Wallbridge =

English DJ, producer and remixer (born 1988)

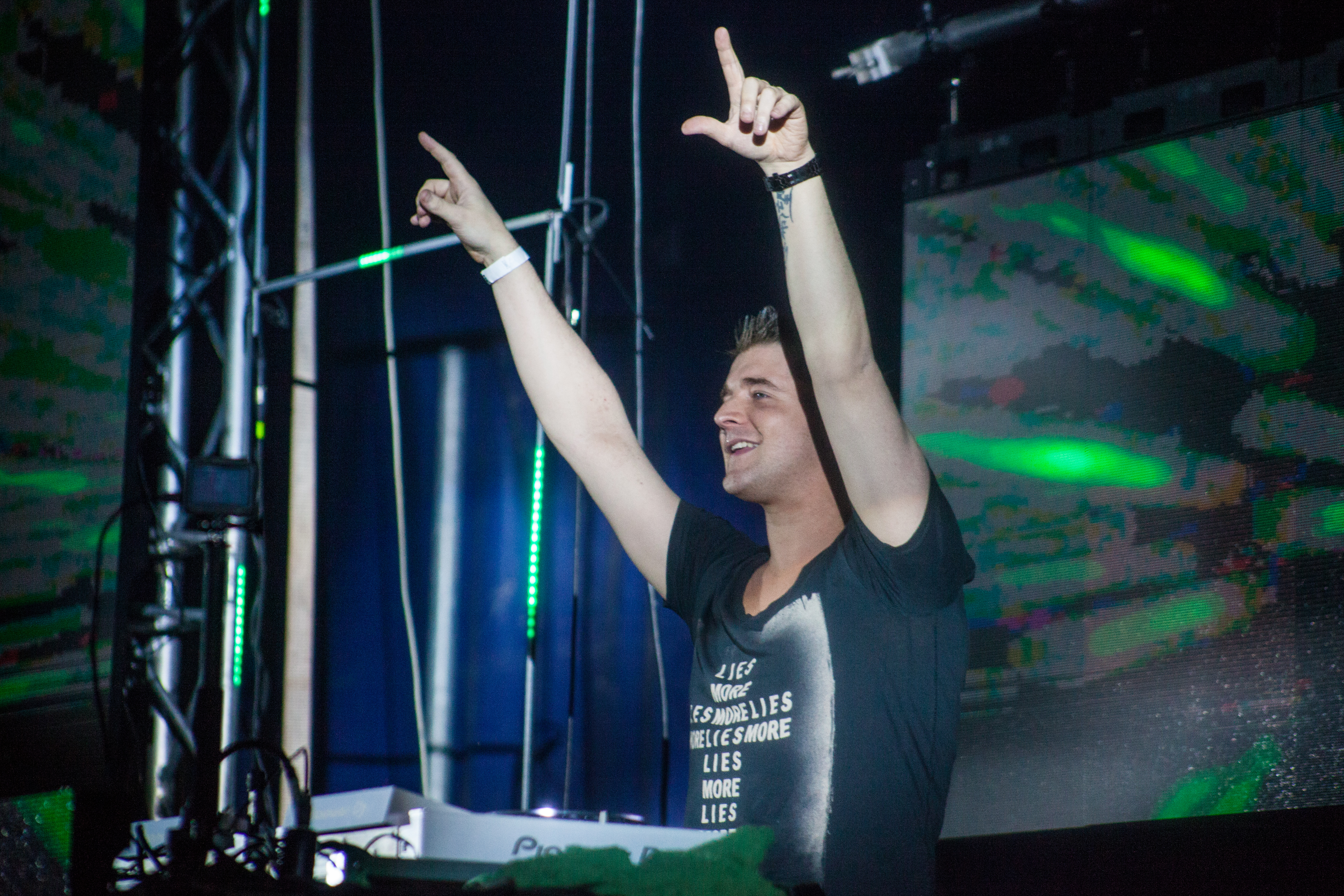
- Wallbridge performing at Beats for Love 2019

Background information
- Born: Ashley Wallbridge
- Origin: Stoke-on-Trent, England
- Genres: Trance, Progressive house
- Occupations: DJ, record producer, remixer
- Years active: 2008–present
- Labels: Armada, LE7ELS, AVA Recordings, Dark Bird Recordings, Auryn Music, Garuda
- Website: www.ashleywallbridge.com

Ashley Wallbridge (born 28 February 1988 in Stoke-on-Trent) is an English DJ, producer, and remixer. Known for his unique sound and big room tracks, his debut album, The Inner Me, was released on 9 March 2012 on Armada Music.

Wallbridge began his DJ career at the age of 15, initially entering a BBC Radio 1 DJ competition using a fake ID, which led to early recognition.

Wallbridge's album The Inner Me reached #5 on the iTunes USA charts, #9 in Canada, and #12 in the UK.

He has performed in over 70 countries, including notable venues such as Hakkasan in Las Vegas, Exchange in Los Angeles, Omnia in San Diego, Ministry of Sound in London, and Privilege in Ibiza. He also holds a residency at Marquee in Las Vegas. His festival appearances include Creamfields, Global Gathering, EDC, and Tomorrowland.

In 2018, Wallbridge partnered with Gareth Emery to relaunch the Garuda label. Their collaboration led to the 2019 album Kingdom United, which reached #1 on the USA charts and entered the Top 10 in the UK, amassing over 20 million streams within a year.

In 2021, Wallbridge released the album Ready For Life, a project he began during a near-fatal battle with meningitis. The album was created from his hospital bed and is a testament to his resilience and artistic vision. It features 13 tracks, including collaborations with artists such as Gavin Beach and Sarah de Warren.

Wallbridge’s discography includes notable singles such as "Surrender" with Darude, which reached #1 on the Beatport charts in 2019. He has also remixed tracks for artists like Avicii, Havana Brown, Krewella, Armin van Buuren, and Gareth Emery.

In 2022, Wallbridge received an award for his music production work with Aston Martin and Lotus Cars, highlighting his versatility and recognition beyond the traditional music industry.

== Discography ==
=== Studio albums ===
- The Inner Me (2012)
- Kingdom United (with Gareth Emery) (2019)
- Ready for Life (2021)

=== Extended plays ===
- The Embrace - EP (2008)
- I Believe (featuring Meighan Nealon) - EP (2009)
- My Blood (featuring Meighan Nealon) - EP (2009)
- Masquerade - EP (2009)
- Faces (with Andy Moor) (featuring Meighan Nealon) - EP (2009)
- Harmonies / Melodies - EP (2010)
- Smoke / Rhythm - EP (2010)
- Liquid / Moonlight Sonata - EP (2011)

=== Singles ===
- Jarhead (2008)
- Livian (2008)
- Reker (2008)
- Spirits (2008)
- Omega (2008)
- Addicted (2008)
- New Moonlight (2008)
- Captive (2008)
- Tempest (2008)
- The Epic (2008)
- Atman (2009)
- Solideritet (2009)
- Dionysus (2009)
- Overture (2009)
- Spitfire (2009)
- Harrier (2009)
- My Blood (featuring Meighan Nealon) (2009)
- Faces (with Andy Moor) (featuring Meighan Nealon) (2009)
- Shotokan (2009)
- Chimera (2009)
- Walk on Water (featuring Elleah) (2010)
- Jynx (2011)
- Vision (2011)
- Mansion (with Gareth Emery) (2011)
- Meta4 (2012)
- Mumbai Traffic (2012)
- World To Turn (2012)
- Zorro (2012)
- Bang The Drum (2012)
- Keep The Fire (2012)
- Grenade (2012)
- Chase The Night (2013)
- Yin-Yang (2013)
- Crush (2013)
- Africa (2013)
- Summertime (2016)
- Melody (featuring Karra) (2016)
- Amnesia (2016)
- See Your Face (featuring Carlos Pena) (2016)
- Goa (2017)
- Undiscovered (featuring Karra) (2017)
- Won't Back Down (featuring Stu Gabriel) (2017)
- Naughts & Crosses (2017)
- FaceOff (with Andy Moor) (2017)
- Strings (2017)
- Surrender (with Darude) (2018)
- Gods (featuring Nash) (2018)
- Kingdom United (with Gareth Emery) (2019)
- Lionheart (with Gareth Emery) (2019)
- Electric Pirates (with Gareth Emery) (2019)
- Amber Sun (with Gareth Emery) (2019)
- "Never Before" (with Gareth Emery featuring Jonathan Mendelsohn) (2019)
- "Diamonds" (featuring Clara Yates) (2019)
- "On the Move" (2019)
- "Still Alive" (featuring Evan Henzi) (2020)
- "World For You" (featuring Sarah De Warren) (2021)
- "As It Rains" (with Daly Brightness featuring Gid Sedgwick) (2021)
- "All My Life" (with Darren Styles featuring Gavin Beach) (2021)
- "Golden Hour" (2021)
- "Beautiful Lies" (featuring Dean Chalmers) (2021)
- "Ghost of You" (with Nash featuring Sally Oh) (2021)
- "Neon Rave" (2021)
- "5000 Miles" (featuring Bodine) (2021)
- "Arena" (2022)
- "Drop" (2023)
- "Master Of" (featuring Bodine) (2023)
- "Pulse" (2023)

=== Remixes ===
- Gai Barone - Appetite (Ashley Wallbridge Remix) (2008)
- Solarity - Laika (Ashley Wallbridge Remix) (2009)
- Phillip Alpha - Sudden Changes (Ashley Wallbridge Remix) (2009)
- Jonathan Martin - Insidious (Ashley Wallbridge Remix) (2009)
- Super8 & Tab - Irufushi (Ashley Wallbridge Remix) (2009)
- Dakota - Steel Libido (Ashley Wallbridge Remix) (2009)
- Ferry Corsten - Feel You (Ashley Wallbridge Remix) (2009)
- DJ Eco - What Do You See? (Ashley Wallbridge Remix) (2009)
- Moonbeam - We Are in Words (Ashley Wallbridge Remix) (2009)
- Michael Angelo & Solo - Alone (Ashley Wallbridge Remix) (2010)
- Tritonal - Forgive Me, Forget You (Ashley Wallbridge Remix) (2010)
- Andy Moor - She Moves (Ashley Wallbridge Remix) (2010)
- Gaia - Aisha (Ashley Wallbridge Remix) (2010)
- Gareth Emery - Arrival (Ashley Wallbridge Remix) (2011)
- Pryda - Melo (Ashley Wallbridge 'The Inner Me' Mix) (2012)
- Topher Jones and Amada featuring Ido - Hello Chicago (Ashley Wallbridge Remix) (2012)
- Avicii - Addicted to You (Ashley Wallbridge Remix) (2014)
- Clean Bandit featuring Jess Glynne - Rather Be (Ashley Wallbridge Remix) (2014)
- Signum featuring Scott Mac – "Coming on Strong" (Gareth Emery and Ashley Wallbridge Remix) (2018)
- Gareth Emery - Long Way Home (Ashley Wallbridge Remix) (2018)
- Johann Stone and Kokaholla featuring Sykamore - End of Time (Ashley Wallbridge Remix) (2019)
- Super8 - Alba (Ashley Wallbridge Remix) (2019)
- Andrew Rayel and Tensteps featuring Runaground - Carry You Home (Ashley Wallbridge Remix) (2021)
- Dash Berlin - Time After Time" (Ashley Wallbridge Remix)

=== Compilations ===
- Digital Society - Volume Three (Mixed by Ashley Wallbridge and Activa) (2010)
- Trance World, Vol. 11 (Mixed by Ashley Wallbridge) (2011)
