= Emma Hewitt =

Australian singer (born 1988)

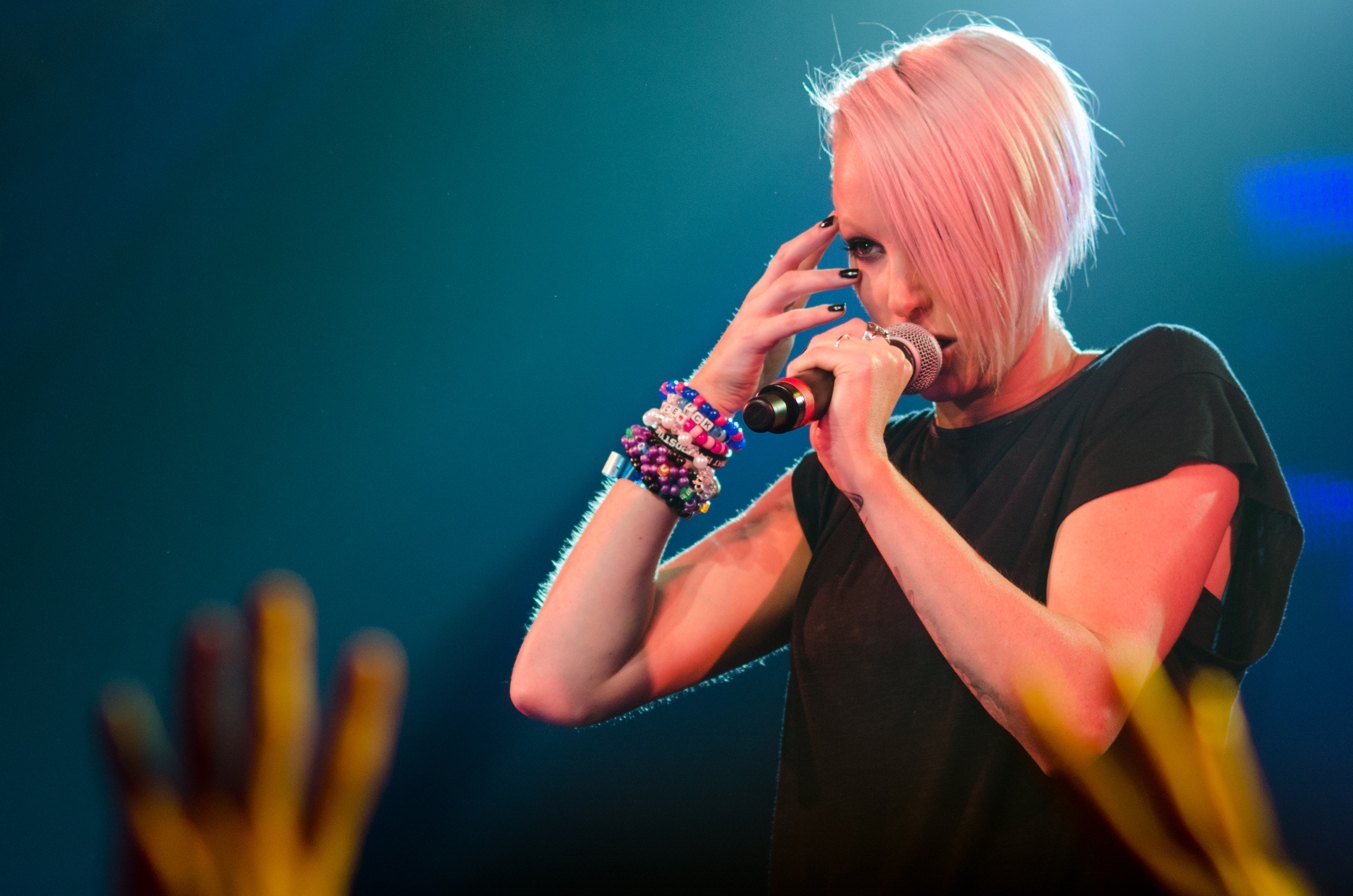
- Emma Hewitt at The Republik in Honolulu, Hawaii, 17 April 2014

Background information
- Born: Emma Louise Hewitt; 28 April 1988 (age 38); Geelong, Victoria, Australia
- Genres: Vocal trance; house; alternative rock
- Occupation: Singer
- Years active: 2002–present
- Labels: Rising/Nervous; Maelstrom/Black Hole; Aropa/Armada; Euphonic; Garuda; Dance Therapy; Tone Diary; Ultra; Monstercat
- Website: emmahewittofficial.com

Emma Louise Hewitt (born 1988) is an Australian singer. She grew up in Geelong, Victoria.

== Biography ==
Hewitt was the lead singer of the Australian rock band Missing Hours, with whom she released an eponymous debut album in October 2008 through Sony Australia. The band that she formed with her brother Anthony is no longer active; in 2010, she and her brother were based in Europe and writing electronic dance music. Now she's a resident of Miami, FL.

Although Hewitt had a musical background in rock music, she released her debut single in 2007 in the field of progressive house: "Carry Me Away" was a collaboration with British DJ Chris Lake. The single reached number 11 in the Spanish singles charts, and number 12 in Finland. The single spent a total of 50 weeks in the Billboard Hot Dance Airplay charts in the United States and reached number 1 in December 2007.

After the success of her first single, she became a trance singer, working with several trance artists such as Armin van Buuren, Dash Berlin, Cosmic Gate, Gareth Emery, Serge Devant and BT. The single "Waiting", which she published with Dash Berlin in 2009, was ranked 25th in the Belgian singles chart and No. 1 on the Global Trance Charts. In Armin van Buuren's radio show A State of Trance the single was elected by the audience with 2,109 votes as the second best song of the year 2009. At the International Dance Music Awards 2010 "Waiting" was awarded as best HiNRG/Euro Track. She was nominated twice in the category Best Trance Track with "Waiting" and "Not Enough Time".

Her debut album, Burn the Sky Down, was released in 2012. Since then, she has had various collaborations with DJs such as Armin van Buuren, Cosmic Gate, Gareth Emery, Aly & Fila, Dash Berlin, 3lau, Schiller, and Andrew Rayel, which have been placed in Trance charts around the world.

In 2016, her song "Restless Hearts", produced alongside Mark Sixma, received a 138-bpm remix from Ben Nicky. The remixed version was crowned "Future Favorite" on A State of Trance episode 767.

In 2020, Emma Hewitt joined forces with Ilan Bluestone and Maor Levi, forming the progressive trance supergroup Elysian and announcing her debut on the Anjunabeats music label. The trio released their first single "Moonchild", preparing the audience for their first EP, named Water, which was released on September 18. According to an interview for Athens Calling, the group has in plan another EP and a worldwide tour after the coronavirus pandemic. Hewitt stated the first single of her second album is going to be out in November and she is planning a tour accompanied by acoustic instruments. The first single, "Into My Arms", was released on July 15, accompanied by a Markus Schulz remix.

== Discography ==
As Missing Hours

- Missing Hours (2008)

As Emma Hewitt

- Burn the Sky Down (2012)
- Ghost of the Light (2023)

As Elysian

- Water EP (2020)

Singles

- 2012: "Colours"
- 2012: "Miss You Paradise"
- 2012: "Still Remember You (Stay Forever)"
- 2012: "Foolish Boy"
- 2012: "Rewind"
- 2013: "Crucify"
- 2022: "Into My Arms"
- 2023: "Warrior"
- 2023: "Raindrop"

Collaborations

- 2007: Chris Lake featuring Emma Hewitt – "Carry Me Away" (Hot Dance Airplay No. 1, Global Dance Tracks #28)
- 2009: Cosmic Gate featuring Emma Hewitt – "Not Enough Time"
- 2009: Serge Devant featuring Emma Hewitt – "Take Me With You"
- 2009: Dash Berlin featuring Emma Hewitt – "Waiting"
- 2009: Amurai featuring Emma Hewitt – "Crucify Yourself"
- 2010: Ronski Speed presents Sun Decade featuring Emma Hewitt – "Lasting Light"
- 2010: Marcus Schössow and Reeves featuring Emma Hewitt – "Light"
- 2010: Gareth Emery with Emma Hewitt – "I Will Be the Same"
- 2010: Lange featuring Emma Hewitt – "Live Forever"
- 2011: Dash Berlin featuring Emma Hewitt – "Disarm Yourself"
- 2011: Allure featuring Emma Hewitt – "No Goodbyes"
- 2011: Allure featuring Emma Hewitt – "Stay Forever"
- 2011: Micky Slim featuring Emma Hewitt – "Tonight"
- 2011: Cosmic Gate featuring Emma Hewitt – "Be Your Sound"
- 2011: Cosmic Gate featuring Emma Hewitt – "Calm Down"
- 2012: Dash Berlin featuring Emma Hewitt – "Like Spinning Plates"
- 2013: Armin van Buuren featuring Emma Hewitt – "Forever is Ours"
- 2013: BT featuring Tritonal and Emma Hewitt – "Calling Your Name"
- 2014: Cosmic Gate featuring Emma Hewitt – "Going Home"
- 2015: 3lau featuring Emma Hewitt – "Alive Again"
- 2015: Mark Sixma and Emma Hewitt – "Restless Hearts"
- 2016: Schiller and Emma Hewitt – "Looking Out for You", "Only Love"
- 2017: Andrew Rayel featuring Emma Hewitt – "My Reflection"
- 2017: Cosmic Gate featuring Emma Hewitt – "Tonight"
- 2017: Mark Sixma featuring Emma Hewitt – "Missing"
- 2017: P.A.F.F. and Emma Hewitt – "Give You Love"
- 2017: Aly & Fila featuring Emma Hewitt – "You & I"
- 2018: 3lau featuring Emma Hewitt – "Worlds Away"
- 2018: Markus Schulz and Emma Hewitt – "Safe from Harm"
- 2018: Gareth Emery and Emma Hewitt – "Take Everything"
- 2019: Cosmic Gate featuring Emma Hewitt – "Not Enough Time 2.0"
- 2020: ilan Bluestone presents Stoneblue featuring Emma Hewitt – "Hypnotized"
- 2020: Elysian (Maor Levi, Ilan Bluestone and Emma Hewitt) – "Moonchild"
- 2020: Elysian – "Beyond the Comfort Zone"
- 2020: BT and Emma Hewitt – "No Warning Lights"
- 2020: Elysian – "Water"
- 2020: Elysian – "Little Star"
- 2022: Moonkids featuring Emma Hewitt – "I Still Remember"
- 2022: Dash Berlin and DubVision featuring Emma Hewitt – "Time After Time"
- 2023: Delerium featuring Emma Hewitt – "Silence"
- 2023: Solarstone featuring Emma Hewitt – "Children"
- 2023: Roman Messer featuring Emma Hewitt – "Fallen"
- 2024: Elysian – "Light Years"
