= Frankie DeCarlos (album) =

Studio album by Frankie DeCarlos
- Released: October 28, 2008
- Length: 47:34
- Label: Chipsa Music Group
- Producers: Frankie DeCarlos, Dubois Johnson

Frankie DeCarlos chronology
Human Man (2007)	Frankie DeCarlos (2008)	EMPIRE (2011)

Frankie DeCarlos is the second studio album by American recording artist Frankie DeCarlos.

== Track listing ==
No.	Title	Writer(s)/Producer(s)	Length
1.	"So High"	Frankie Patrick	1:17
2.	"She Said"	Frankie Patrick	3:11
3.	"Turning Me On"	Dubois Johnson, Frankie Patrick	4:36
4.	"I Know"	Frankie Patrick, Jermain Jordan	3:31
5.	"Can't Wait"	Dubois Johnson, Frankie Patrick	1:44
6.	"Do You Know"	Frankie Patrick	5:12
7.	"Changing Colors"	Frankie Patrick, Calvin Bonds	3:53
8.	"Come & Go" (featuring Poppy the Chef)	Dubois Johnson, Antoine Washington, Frankie Patrick	3:01
9.	"What's Going On?"	Dubois Johnson, Garrick Jordan, Frankie Patrick	3:35
10.	"Leave Me Alone"	Frankie Patrick	4:07
11.	"Dancing in the Streets of LA"	Frankie Patrick	3:47
12.	"Can't Wait (Extended Lovin')"	Dubois Johnson, Frankie Patrick	3:34
13.	"She Said (Instrumental)"	Frankie Patrick	3:12
14.	"July 4th"	Dubois Johnson, Israel Dease, Frankie Patrick	2:54
Total length:			47:34
