= Dash Berlin =

Dutch band

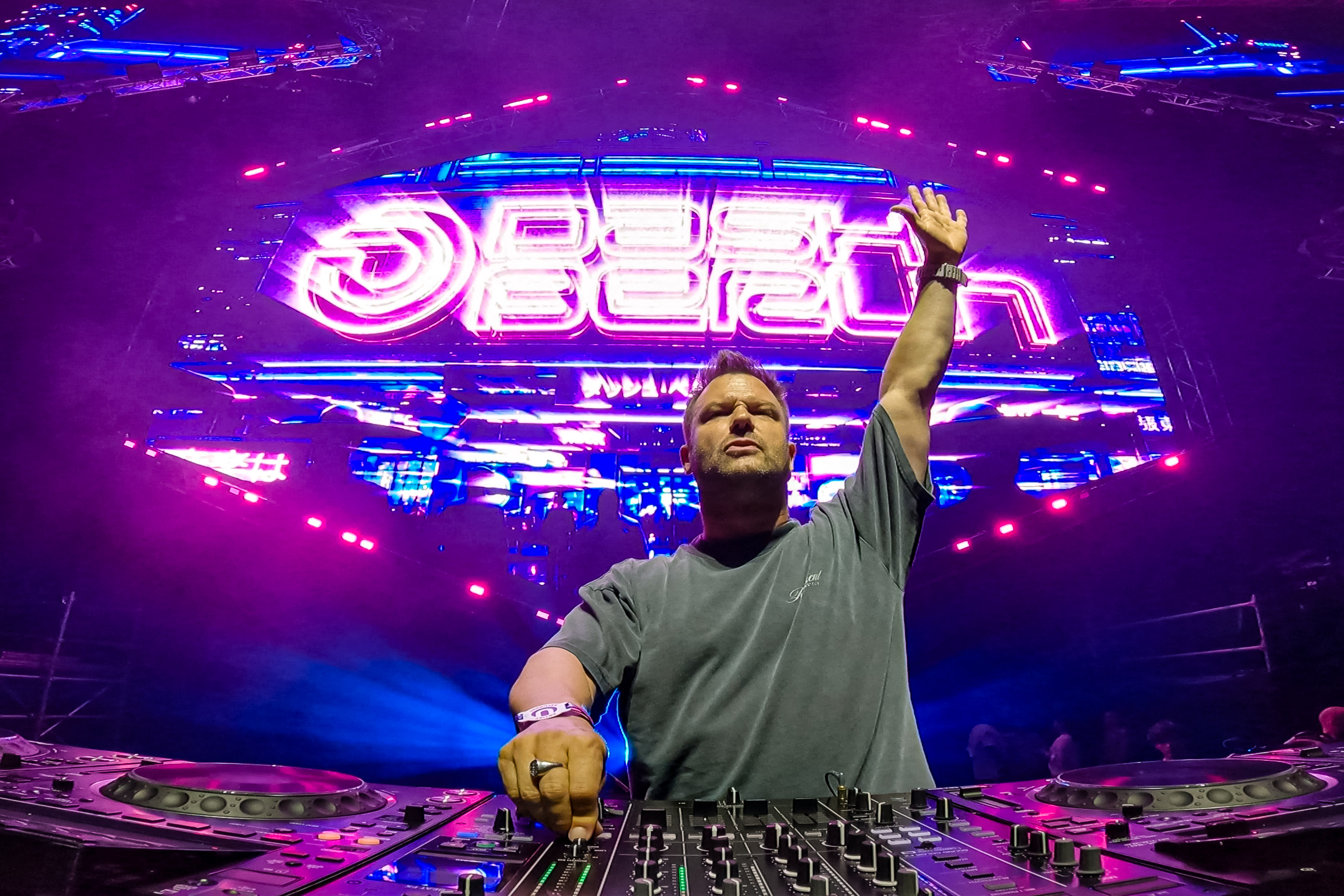
- Dutch DJ Dash Berlin performing at the Ultra Europe mainstage in 2026

Background information
- Origin: The Hague, Netherlands
- Genres: Trance; progressive house
- Years active: 2006–present
- Labels: Armada; Aropa; Revealed; DistroKid
- Members: Jeffrey Sutorius
- Website: dashberlin.com

Dash Berlin is the Dutch electronic music project of Jeffrey Sutorius. Started in 2007 as a collaboration between Sutorius, Eelke Kalberg and Sebastiaan Molijn in The Hague with Jeffrey Sutorius as the DJ frontman of the trio of producers.

In May 2026, it was announced that Jeffrey Sutorius would make his official return as the sole owner of the Dash Berlin project after emerging victorious from a legal dispute.. July 11th, 2026 marked the first time Jeffrey Sutorius played as Dash Berlin again since the end of the dispute - DJ'ing at the mainstage of Ultra Europe festival in Split, Croatia .

Dash Berlin were voted the seventh most popular DJs in the world according to DJ Mag in 2012; Kalberg and Molijn were record producers. Kalberg and Molijn left the group in 2019 and returned in 2021 after initially winning a legal dispute against Jeffrey Sutorius over the "Dash Berlin" trademark. From 2022 to 2026, Ryan Fieret served as temporary frontman of the group.

Kalberg and Molijn have been contributing to the international dance scene for over twenty years, with award-winning and platinum-selling hits for dance acts such as Alice Deejay, Vengaboys, Candee Jay, Pronti and Kalmani and Solid Sessions. Their track "Better Off Alone" was one of the first trance records that became big in the U.S. and was later sampled by French superstar DJ David Guetta in his song "Play Hard" and one of America's biggest rappers Wiz Khalifa in his breakthrough record "Say Yeah". They also had worked together with DJ Sander Kleinenberg on classic tracks like "This Is Miami" and "The Fruit" and remixes for major artists such as Justin Timberlake ('Rock Your Body' Remix winning the award for 'Best Remix' at the Dance Star USA Awards), Janet Jackson, BT, Usher, N.E.R.D., Lenny Kravitz, Junkie XL, Röyksopp, Mylo and Annie Lennox.

On 18 June 2018, Sutorius announced his split from Dash Berlin and severed ties with Kalberg and Molijn, citing issues of mismanagement and career neglect. Starting in October 2018, Sutorius began performing and releasing songs under his own name, while Dash Berlin continued as a duo. Sutorius later gained legal ownership of the name on 21 June 2019 while Kalberg and Molijn were forced out from Dash Berlin to pursue their own musical projects.

On 29 March 2021, Sutorius announced on his Facebook page that he would onwards perform, produce and release music under his own name "Jeffrey Sutorius". The announcement came after he had lost a legal dispute with the former members of the group, who had since 17 March reclaimed legal ownership of the Dash Berlin trademark.

On 6 May 2026, it was announced that Sutorius regained the rights to perform, produce, and release music under the Dash Berlin name.

== History ==
=== Formation ===
Dash Berlin was formed by Jeffrey Sutorius with Kalberg and Molijn in The Hague, Netherlands,. Jeffrey Sutorius was a fan of electronic music from his high school days and in his late teens worked in a record store and became a collector of vinyl trance music. Inspired by pioneering figures such as Sven Väth, Oliver Lieb and Sander Kleinenberg, Sutorius began mixing and producing his own music. He released his first record on 'BPM Legends' records. He started performing in the Dutch underground music scene in early '95 and teamed up with fellow producers and close friends Kalberg and Molijn to form Dash Berlin into a trio in 2006.

=== Sutorius' split from group and eventual return ===
On 18 June 2018, Jeffrey Sutorius announced through a press statement that he would be leaving the group, while cutting his connections with Kalberg, Molijn, and the Vanderkleij Agency. He revealed that Molijn and Kalberg had registered the name "Dash Berlin" under their own names while leaving him out, thus leaving him legally unable to perform as Dash Berlin. Further attempts to reconcile through lawyers and courts had failed, and Sutorius was also blocked from accessing the group's social media accounts after severing ties with his former partners. Sutorius later announced that he would be producing and performing under his own name, beginning October 2018.

In a second press statement with DJ Mag, Sutorius revealed that his intense touring periods had brought up health issues for him in late-2017, which in turn led him to take two months off for a physical checkup. During that time period, Sutorius was unable to perform, to his management's heavy opposition. He eventually stopped working with his booking company, while Kalberg and Molijn froze Sutorius out of Dash Berlin's social media accounts and filed a court claim against him for failure to fulfil his booked shows. The court later denied the claim. Kalberg and Molijn's reasons for registering the Dash Berlin name without Sutorius are still unclear due to their refusal to provide documents and information to Sutorius.

On 21 June 2019, Dash Berlin released an official statement which announced the departure of Kalberg and Molijn from the group, leaving behind Sutorius to lead the group as a solo artist. The group concluded that the "chemistry between [Dash Berlin] is gone and that it is time for a change", with the former producers focusing on new musical projects.

In May 2026, Dash Berlin announced via a cryptic Instagram post that Jeffrey Sutorius would make his return as the solo member of the group.

== Recognition ==
The breakthrough for Dash Berlin came in early 2007 with "Till the Sky Falls Down". The track went to the top of the trance charts worldwide, due in part to Armin van Buuren who included it on the third chapter of his acclaimed Universal Religion mix album. Van Buuren subsequently signed Dash Berlin to the Armada Music label.

Dash Berlin won the IDMA award for the track "Waiting" in the category 'Best High Energy Track' and was nominated three times at the International Dance Music Awards, during the WMC in Miami in 2009. His tracks "Waiting" featuring Australian singer Emma Hewitt and "Man On The Run", a collaboration with fellow Armada artists Cerf, Mitiska and Jaren were both nominated that year in the category 'Best Trance Track'. In Armin van Buuren's popular radio show A State of Trance the "Waiting" single was elected by the audience to the second best trance track of the year 2009. The music video is shot in Rotterdam and gained over twenty-five million views on YouTube.

In 2010, Dash were nominated for the "Best European DJ" at the IDMA's and entered the DJ Mag Top 100 poll at number 15. They won the DJ Mag Top 100 Award for "Highest New Entry", during the Magazine's ceremony at the Ministry Of Sound in London, hosted by Boy George. Beating other famous Dutch DJs such as Armin van Buuren, Tiesto, Ferry Corsten as the highest Dutch entry to date. On 20 October 2011, DJ Magazine announced the results of their annual Top 100 DJ Poll for the very first time in Amsterdam, with Dash Berlin placed at number eight in the world. In 2012, Dash Berlin receives a nomination for "Best Trance Track" at the IDMA's for his track with Jonathan Mendelsohn entitled "Better Half Of Me". October 2012: In Mexico Dash Berlin are nominated for a prestigious Lunas Award in the category Electronic Music among other artists such as Armin van Buuren, Paul van Dyk, and David Guetta, among others. Later that month, Dash were ranked number 7 in the DJ Mag Top 100 poll, making them the second most popular Trance DJ in the world, right after their mentor Armin van Buuren. In December 2012, Dash Berlin were nominated for a 'Tunisia Music Award', Africa's biggest award show to date. Also in December, Dash Berlin headlined the Sunset Music Festival in Sri Lanka for the first time. In February 2013, Dash Berlin headlined Ultra Chile and Ultra Buenos Aires with Avicii, Carl Cox and Armin van Buuren. In 2013, Dash Berlin received a nomination for the "Best Trance Track" at the IDMA awards for their single "When You Were Around" featuring British singer Kate Walsh.

Dash Berlin was the first DJ to be announced for Armin van Buuren's A State Of Trance 600 event in 2013. Dash played at ASOT Den Bosch, ASOT Mexico City, ASOT Minsk, ASOT Sofia, ASOT Beirut, and ASOT Guatemala.

In 2014, Dash Berlin were nominated for the 2014 Ibiza DJ Award, but lost out to Iban Mendoza.

== Aropa Records ==
In early 2009, plans emerged to expand the Dash Berlin influence with their own label called Aropa Records. The first release under the new label is "Man on the Run", a collaboration with fellow Armada artists Cerf, Mitiska and Jaren. The track rocketed to the top of the international trance charts and received a nomination for 'Best Trance Track' at the annual Trance Awards. The song is also the lead single of their debut album The New Daylight which was released later that year in October. In April 2012, Dash Berlin released their second artist album on Aropa and Armada Music titled #Musicislife.

== North Sea Music ==
In April 2021, it was announced that Dash Berlin had started a new label that was distributed via the DistroKid service called North Sea Music. Currently it is a private label, however the trio teased at the idea of opening it up to more indie artists sometime soon.

== Discography ==
=== Studio albums ===
List of studio albums
Title	Album details
The New Daylight	Released: 12 October 2009; Label: Armada, Aropa; Format: CD, digital download
#Musicislife	Released: 27 April 2012; Label: Armada; Format: CD, digital download
We Are (Part 1)	Released: 29 August 2014; Label: Aropa; Format: CD, digital download
We Are (Part 2)	Released: 24 March 2017; Label: Armada; Format: CD, digital download

=== Singles ===
List of singles, with selected chart positions and certifications
Title	Year	Peak chart positions		Album
Title	Year	NLD	BEL	Album
"Till the Sky Falls Down"	2007	36	—	The New Daylight
"Man on the Run" (with Cerf, Mitiska and Jaren)	2009	93	—	The New Daylight
"Waiting" (featuring Emma Hewitt)	2009	—	25	The New Daylight
"Never Cry Again"	2010	—	—	The New Daylight
"Janeiro" (featuring Solid Sessions)	2010	—	—	The New Daylight
"Disarm Yourself" (featuring Emma Hewitt)	2011	—	—	#Musicislife
"Apollo Road" (with ATB)	2011	—	—	Distant Earth
"Better Half of Me" (featuring Jonathan Mendelsohn)	2011	—	—	#Musicislife
"World Falls Apart" (featuring Jonathan Mendelsohn)	2012	—	—	#Musicislife
"Go It Alone" (featuring Sarah Howells)	2012	—	—	#Musicislife
"Silence in Your Heart" (featuring Chris Madin)	2012	—	—	#Musicislife
"Like Spinning Plates" (featuring Emma Hewitt)	2012	—	—	#Musicislife
"When You Were Around" (featuring Kate Walsh)	2012	—	—	#Musicislife
"Fool for Life" (featuring Chris Madin)	2013	—	—	#Musicislife
"Steal You Away" (with Alexander Popov featuring Jonathan Mendelsohn)	2013	—	—	#Musicislife
"Jar of Hearts" (featuring Christina Novelli)	2013	—	—	#Musicislife
"Dragonfly" (with Carita La Nina)	2014	—	—	Non-album single
"Earth Meets Water" (with Rigby)	2014	—	—	We Are (Part 1)
"Here Tonight" (with Jay Cosmic featuring Collin McLoughlin)	2014	—	—	We Are (Part 1)
"Somehow" (with 3lau featuring Bright Lights)	2014	—	—	We Are (Part 1)
"Shelter" (featuring Roxanne Emery)	2014	—	—	We Are (Part 1)
"Never Let You Go" (with John Dahlbäck featuring BullySongs)	2015	—	—	We Are (Part 1)
"This Is Who We Are" (with Syzz)	2015	—	—	We Are (Part 2)
"Underneath the Sky" (featuring Christon)	2015	—	—	We Are (Part 1)
"Yesterday Is Gone" (with DubVision featuring Jonny Rose)	2015	—	—	We Are (Part 2)
"I Take Care" (vs. Clément Bcx)	2015	—	—	We Are (Part 2)
"Gold" (with Dbstf featuring Jake Reese, Waka Flocka and DJ Whoo Kid)	2016	—	—	We Are (Part 2)
"Without the Sun" (with Luca Perra)	2016	—	—	We Are (Part 2)
"Heaven" (featuring Do)	2016	—	—	We Are (Part 2)
"Listen to Your Heart" (featuring Christina Novelli)	2017	—	—	We Are (Part 2)
"Save Myself" (with Dbstf featuring Josie Nelson)	2018	—	—	Non-album singles
"Locked Out of Heaven" (cover, featuring Jonathan Mendelsohn)	2019	—	—	Non-album singles
"You Broke Me First" (cover)	2021	—	—	Non-album singles
"Oceans"	2021	—	—	Non-album singles
"Home at Last" (with Sir Notch)	2021	—	—	Non-album singles
"All I Want " (cover, featuring Bo Bruce)	2022	—	—	Non-album singles
"Time After Time" (cover, with DubVision and Emma Hewitt)	2022	—	—	Non-album singles
"Better Off (Alone, Pt. III)" (with Alan Walker and Vikkstar)	2023	—	—	Walkerworld
"Trustfall" (with Christina Novelli)	2025	—	—	Non-album singles
"Moonburn" (with Dani Sylvia)	2025	—	—	Non-album singles
"Finally Home" (with Sir Notch)	2025	—	—	Non-album singles
"Lonely Man" (with Simon Ward)	2026	—	—	Non-album singles
"—" denotes a recording that did not chart or was not released.

=== Remixes ===
- 2004: Motorcycle – "As the Rush Comes" (Dash Berlin Remix)
- 2008: Cerf, Mitiska and Jaren – "You Never Said" (Dash Berlin Remix)
- 2009: Medina – "You & I" (Dash Berlin Remix)
- 2009: Depeche Mode – "Peace" (Dash Berlin Remix)
- 2010: Armin van Buuren vs. Sophie Ellis-Bextor – "Not Giving Up On Love" (Dash Berlin 4AM Mix)
- 2011: Filo & Peri featuring Audrey Gallagher – "This Night" (Dash Berlin Remix)
- 2011: First State featuring Sarah Howells – "Reverie" (Dash Berlin Remix)
- 2011: Lange pres. Firewall – "Touched" (Dash Berlin's 'Sense Of Touch' Remix)
- 2012: Ferry Corsten featuring Betsie Larkin – "Not Coming Down" (Dash Berlin 4AM Remix)
- 2012: Alesso featuring Matthew Koma – "Years" (Dash Berlin Remix)
- 2012: Coldplay – "Clocks" (Dash Berlin Rework)
- 2013: OneRepublic – "If I Lose Myself" (Dash Berlin Remix)
- 2013: Hardwell featuring Amba Shepherd – "Apollo" (Dash Berlin 4AM Remix)
- 2013: Krewella – "Live for the Night" (Dash Berlin Remix)
- 2014: Zedd featuring Matthew Koma and Miriam Bryant – "Find You" (Dash Berlin Remix)
- 2014: Cash Cash featuring John Rzeznik – "Lightning" (Dash Berlin 4AM Remix)
- 2014: U2 – "Iris (Hold Me Close)" (Dash Berlin Rework)
- 2015: Lost Frequencies – "Are You with Me" (Dash Berlin Remix)
- 2015: Calvin Harris featuring Ellie Goulding – "Outside" (Dash Berlin Ultra Miami Rework)
- 2015: Dash Berlin featuring Emma Hewitt – "Waiting" (Dash Berlin 2015 Miami Remix)
- 2016: Alan Walker featuring Iselin Solheim – "Faded" (Dash Berlin Remix)
- 2016: RedOne featuring Enrique Iglesias, R. City, Serayah & Shaggy – "Don't You Need Somebody" (Dash Berlin Remix)
- 2016: Alesso featuring Matthew Koma – "Years" (Dash Berlin Remix) (2016 version)
- 2016: Maroon 5 featuring Kendrick Lamar – "Don't Wanna Know" (Dash Berlin Rework)
- 2016: Adam Lambert – "Ghost Town" (Dash Berlin Remix)
- 2017: Clean Bandit featuring Zara Larsson – "Symphony" (Dash Berlin Remix)
- 2017: Zara Larsson – "I Would Like" (Dash Berlin Remix)
- 2017: Gareth Emery featuring Christina Novelli – "Concrete Angel" (Dash Berlin Remix)
- 2018: Lost Frequencies and Zonderling – "Crazy" (Dash Berlin Remix)
- 2019: San Holo – "Lost Lately" (Dash Berlin Remix)
- 2021: Linkin Park – "In the End" (Dash Berlin 4AM Remix)
- 2022: Dash Berlin featuring Emma Hewitt – "Waiting" (Miami Edit)
- 2022: Dash Berlin featuring Jonathan Mendelsohn – "Better Half of Me" (Miami Edit)
- 2023: Dash Berlin featuring Cerf, Mistika, and Jaren – "Man on the Run" (Miami Edit)
- 2025: Drove featuring Lilly Ahlberg - "Here By Now" (Dash Berlin Remix)

== Jeffrey Sutorius Discography formerly credited to Dash Berlin ==
This is a list of songs released under the Dash Berlin name under the period from when control of the band's name was legally owned by former live member Jeffrey Sutorius in 2019, and when other members Eelke and Sebastiaan won the legal battle to regain ownership of the band.

=== Singles ===
List of singles by Jeffrey Sutorius
Title	Year	Album
"New Dawn" (featuring Haliene)	2020	Non-album singles
"Chasin' the Sun" (featuring Jess Hall)	2020	Non-album singles
"Lighting the Bridges" (featuring Roxanne Emery)	2020	Non-album singles
"Keep Me Close" (with Timmo Hendrinks)	2020	Non-album singles
"See in the Dark" (featuring Gid Sedgwick)	2020	Non-album singles
"No Regrets" (featuring Jordan Grace)	2020	Non-album singles
"Skies" (with Blackcode featuring Charlie Miller)	2020	Non-album singles
"Souls of the Ocean"	2020	Non-album singles
"Firefly" (with ANG)	2021	Non-album singles

=== Remixes ===
- 2018: Avicii featuring Sandro Cavazza — "Without You" (Dash Berlin Rework)
- 2019: Myon featuring Icon — "Cold Summer" (Dash Berlin Remix)
- 2019: Marco V — "Come Back Home" (Dash Berlin Remix)
- 2019: Gattüso and Damon Sharpe — "When In Rome" (Dash Berlin Remix)
- 2019: Laidback Luke and Marc Benjamin — "We're Forever" (Dash Berlin Remix)
- 2019: OneRepublic — "Rescue Me" (Dash Berlin Remix)
- 2020: Sam Feldt featuring Sigma and Gia Koka — "2 Hearts" (Dash Berlin Remix)
- 2020: Nicky Romero — "Stay" (Dash Berlin Remix)
- 2020: Steve Aoki featuring Kita Sovee and Julien Marchal — "Closer To God" (Dash Berlin Remix)
- 2020: Gattüso featuring Kat Nestel — "Walk on Water" (Dash Berlin Remix)
- 2020: Darius & Finlay — "Clothes Off (Nanana)" (Dash Berlin Remix)
- 2020: Zoe Wees — "Control" (Dash Berlin Remix)
- 2020: Maroon 5 — "Memories" (Dash Berlin Remix)
- 2020: Benny Benassi featuring BB Team and Canguro English — "Everybody Hates Monday Mornings" (Dash Berlin Remix)
