= Armin van Buuren discography =

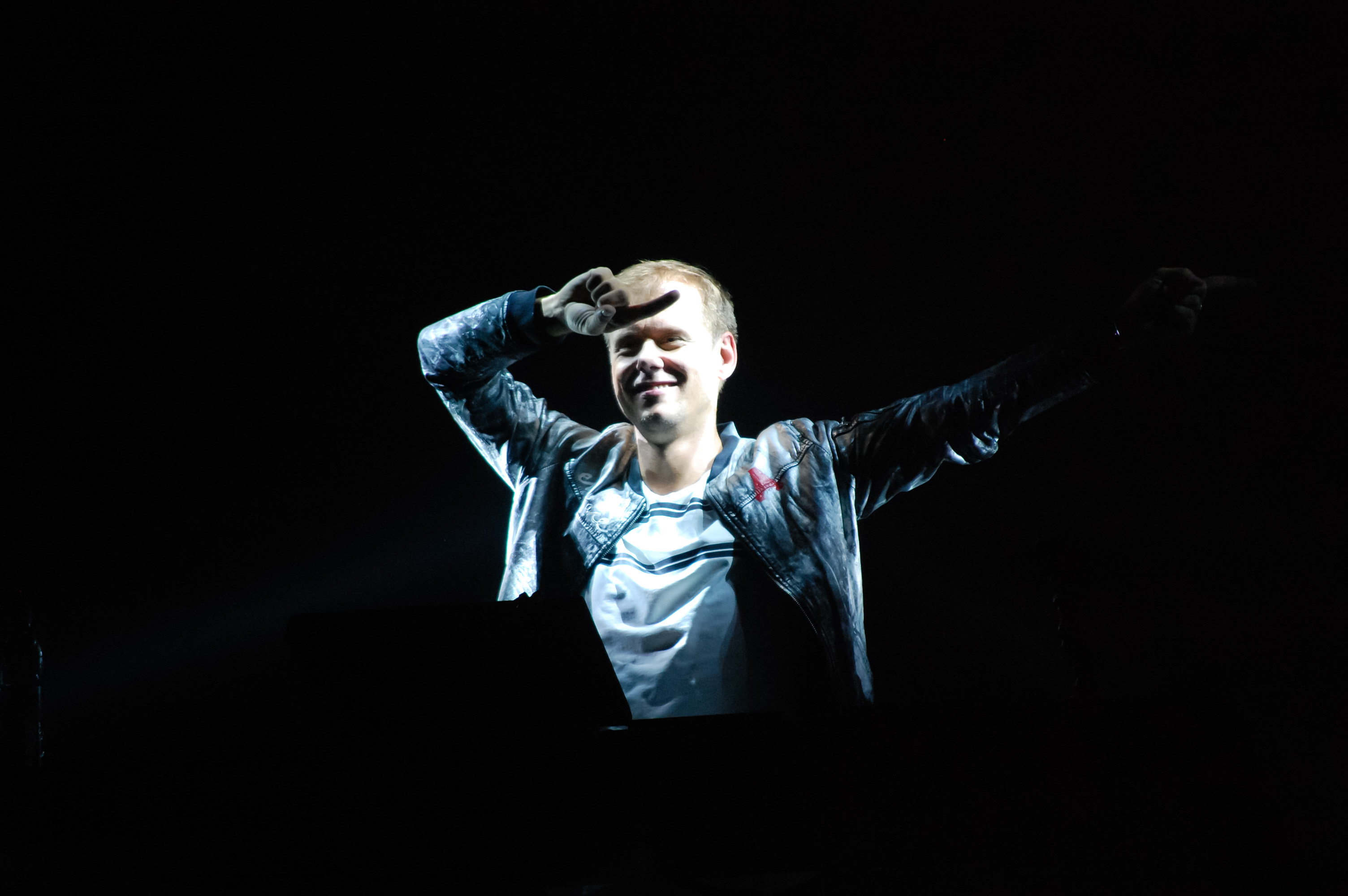
- van Buuren in 2017
- Studio albums: 10
- Extended plays: 6
- Compilation albums: 8
- Singles: 170+
- Video albums: 7
- Remix albums: 8
- Remixes: 47

The discography of Dutch DJ and record producer Armin van Buuren consists of ten studio albums, eight compilation albums, six extended plays (EP), eight remix albums, more than 170 singles, 47 remixes, seven video albums and several DJ mixes.

Van Buuren's most commercially successful single is "This Is What It Feels Like" featuring Trevor Guthrie. It reached the top ten in several countries, including number three on the Dutch Top 40, number six on the UK Singles Chart and number 96 on the US Billboard Hot 100. The song was nominated for Best Dance Recording at the 56th Annual Grammy Awards.

Van Buuren has collaborated with artists such as Trevor Guthrie, Sharon den Adel, Sophie Ellis-Bextor, Sam Martin, Nadia Ali, Susana, Davina Michelle, David Guetta, Martin Garrix, Hardwell, W&W, Ferry Corsten, Vini Vici, Gryffin, Moby, Bon Jovi and Pendulum. His discography also includes releases under aliases and side projects including Gaia, Rising Star, Perpetuous Dreamer and Alibi, along with long-running DJ mix series such as A State of Trance, A State of Trance Year Mix, Universal Religion and A State of Trance Ibiza.

== Albums ==
=== Studio albums ===
List of studio albums, with selected chart positions and certifications
| Title | Album details | Peak chart positions | | | | | | | | Certifications |
| Title | Album details | NLD | AUS | AUT | BEL | GER | SWI | UK | US | Certifications |
|---|---|---|---|---|---|---|---|---|---|---|
| 76 | Released: 7 June 2003; Label: United; Format: CD | 38 | — | — | — | — | — | — | — | |
| Shivers | Released: 8 August 2005; Label: Armada Music; Format: CD, digital download | 23 | — | — | — | — | — | — | — | |
| Imagine | Released: 18 April 2008; Label: Armada Music; Format: CD, digital download | 1 | — | — | — | — | — | — | 157 | NVPI: Gold |
| Mirage | Released: 10 September 2010; Label: Armada Music; Format: CD, digital download | 3 | 53 | 53 | 10 | 42 | — | 113 | 148 | NVPI: Gold |
| Intense | Released: 3 May 2013; Label: Armada Music; Format: CD, digital download, vinyl | 2 | — | 20 | 15 | 16 | 26 | 37 | 65 | NVPI: Gold |
| Embrace | Released: 29 October 2015; Label: Armada Music; Format: CD, digital download, vinyl | 1 | — | — | 40 | 73 | 82 | — | — | |
| Balance | Released: 25 October 2019; Label: Armada Music; Format: 2×CD, digital download, vinyl | 11 | — | 70 | 47 | 45 | 52 | — | — | NVPI: Gold |
| Feel Again | Released: 31 March 2023 (Part 1 & Part 2 were released in 2022 individually); Label: Armada Music; Format: 3×CD, digital download | 17 | — | — | 81 | 77 | — | — | — | |
| Breathe | Released: 27 June 2025 (including Breathe Out. Breathe In was released on 12 January 2024 individually); Label: Armada Music; Format: 3xCD, digital download, vinyl | — | — | — | — | — | — | — | — | |
| Piano | Released: 31 October 2025; Label: Armada Music; Format: CD, digital download, vinyl | — | — | — | — | — | — | — | — | |
"—" denotes a recording that did not chart or was not released in that territory.

=== Remix albums ===
List of remix albums, with selected chart positions
| Title | Album details | Peak chart positions |
| Title | Album details | NLD |
|---|---|---|
| Imagine – The Remixes | Released: 9 February 2009; Label: Armada Music; Format: 2xCD, digital download | 49 |
| Mirage – The Remixes | Released: 17 June 2011; Label: Armada Music; Format: 2×CD, digital download | 11 |
| Intense – The More Intense Edition | Released: 3 May 2013; Label: Armada Music; Format: 2×CD, digital download | — |
| Club Embrace | Released: 21 October 2016; Label: Armada Music; Format: 2×CD, digital download | 22 |
| Balance (Remixes) | Released: 20 March 2020; Label: Armada Music; Format: Digital download | — |
| Relaxed | Released: 29 May 2020; Label: Armada Music; Format: Digital download | — |
| Lost Tapes | Released: 31 July 2020; Label: Armada Music; Format: Digital download | — |
| Feel Again (Remixes) | Released: 22 December 2023; Label: Armada Music; Format: Digital download | — |
"—" denotes a recording that did not chart or was not released in that territory.

=== Compilation albums ===
List of compilation albums, with selected chart positions
| Title | Album details | Peak chart positions | |
| Title | Album details | NLD | BEL |
|---|---|---|---|
| 10 Years | Released: 11 November 2006; Label: Armada Music; Format: 2xCD, digital download | 45 | — |
| Limited Edition | Released: 29 November 2007; Label: Armada Music; Format: 3×CD + 2×DVD (10 years (2×CD) + bonus CD + Armin only 2006 (2×DVD)) | — | — |
| The Music Videos 1997–2009 | Released: 30 November 2009; Label: Armada Music; Format: DVD + CD | — | — |
| Armin Only – Mirage (Deluxe Edition) | Released: 18 November 2011; Label: Armada Music; Format: 3×CD + DVD (Mirage (CD) + Mirage bonus tracks (CD) + unreleased remixes (CD) + music videos & video reports (DVD)) | — | — |
| Anthems – Ultimate Singles Collected | Released: 7 November 2014; Label: Armada Music; Format: CD, digital download | 5 | 84 |
| Armin Only – Intense (The Most Intense Edition) | Released: 5 December 2014; Label: Armada Music; Format: (4×CD + DVD) (Intense (CD) + More Intense (CD) + Most Intense – Live from Armin Only (2×CD) + Armin Only – Intense Live Registration & the Road Movie (DVD)) | — | — |
| The Best of Armin Only | Released: 13 May 2017; Label: Armada Music; Format: 2×CD, digital download | 3 | 102 |
| A State of Trance Forever | Released: 3 Sep 2021; Label: Armada Music; Format: CD, digital download | 66 | 115 |
"—" denotes a recording that did not chart or was not released in that territory.

=== DJ mixes ===
| Year | Title | Format | Label | Notes |
|---|---|---|---|---|
| 1999 | United | CD | United | Promotional mix |
| 1999 | Artist Profile Series 4: Boundaries of Imagination | CD | Black Hole | |
| 2000 | TranceMatch | CD | Cutting Edge | System F vs. Armin |
| 2000 | 001 A State of Trance | 2×CD | United | |
| 2001 | 002 Basic Instinct | 2×CD | United | |
| 2001 | 003 In Motion | 2×CD | United | |
| 2002 | 004 Transparence | 2×CD | United | |
| 2004 | Big Room Trance | CD | Mixmag | |
| 2008 | Live at the Gallery, Ministry of Sound | CD | Mixmag | |
| 2008 | Armin Only: Imagine – The Music | Digital | Armada Music | Digital download only |
| 2008 | Armin Only – Imagine (Limited Edition) | 3×CD + DVD | Armada Music | |
| 2009 | Raveline Mix Sessions 014 | Digital | | Digital download only |
| 2011 | Armin Only: Mirage – The Music | Digital | Armada Music | Digital download only |
| 2011 | A State of Trance 500 | 5×CD | Armada Music | Mixed with Paul Oakenfold, Markus Schulz, Cosmic Gate and Andy Moor |
| 2012 | A State of Trance 550 – Invasion | 5×CD | Armada Music | Mixed with Dash Berlin, John O'Callaghan, Arty and Ørjan Nilsen |
| 2013 | A State of Trance 600 – The Expedition | 5×CD | Armada Music | Mixed with ATB, W&W, Rank 1 and Andrew Rayel |
| 2014 | A State of Trance 650 – New Horizons | 5×CD | Armada Music | Mixed with BT, Aly & Fila, Kyau & Albert and Omnia |
| 2014 | Armin Only – Intense (The Most Intense Edition) | 4×CD + DVD | Armada Music | Intense, More Intense, and Most Intense (CDs); Armin Only (Live) (CD); Intense live registration, and road film (DVD) |
| 2015 | Armin Only: Intense – The Music | Digital | Armada Music | Digital download only |
| 2016 | A State of Trance – Warm Up Sets | 7×CD | Armada Music | Selections by Armin van Buuren |
| 2016 | A State of Trance – 15 Years | 2×CD | Armada Music | |
| 2017 | A State of Trance 800 (The Official Compilation) | 2×CD | Armada Music | |
| 2018 | A State of Trance 850 (The Official Album) | 2×CD | Armada Music | |
| 2019 | A State of Trance 900 (The Official Album) | 2×CD | Armada Music | |
| 2020 | A State of Trance 950 (The Official Album) | 2×CD | Armada Music | |
| 2021 | A State of Trance 1000 – Celebration Mix | 2×CD | Armada Music | |
| 2023 | A State of Trance – Celebration Weekend | Digital | Armada Music | Digital download only |

==== A State of Trance series ====
| Year | Title | Format | Label | Ref. |
|---|---|---|---|---|
| 2004 | A State of Trance 2004 | 2×CD | Armada Music | |
| 2005 | A State of Trance 2005 | 2×CD | Armada Music | |
| 2006 | A State of Trance 2006 | 2×CD | Armada Music | |
| 2007 | A State of Trance 2007 | 2×CD | Armada Music | |
| 2008 | A State of Trance 2008 | 2×CD | Armada Music | |
| 2009 | A State of Trance 2009 | 2×CD | Armada Music | |
| 2010 | A State of Trance 2010 | 2×CD | Armada Music | |
| 2011 | A State of Trance 2011 | 2×CD | Armada Music | |
| 2012 | A State of Trance 2012 | 2×CD | Armada Music | |
| 2013 | A State of Trance 2013 | 2×CD | Armada Music | |
| 2014 | A State of Trance 2014 | 2×CD | Armada Music | |
| 2015 | A State of Trance 2015 | 2×CD | Armada Music | |
| 2016 | A State of Trance 2016 | 2×CD | Armada Music | |
| 2017 | A State of Trance 2017 | 2×CD | Armada Music | |
| 2018 | A State of Trance 2018 | 2×CD | Armada Music | |
| 2019 | A State of Trance 2019 | 2×CD | Armada Music | |
| 2020 | A State of Trance 2020 | 2×CD | Armada Music | |
| 2021 | A State of Trance 2021 | 2×CD | Armada Music | |
| 2022 | A State of Trance 2022 | 2×CD | Armada Music | |
| 2023 | A State of Trance 2023 | 3×CD | Armada Music | |
| 2024 | A State of Trance 2024 | 3×CD | Armada Music | |
| 2025 | A State of Trance 2025 | 3×CD | Armada Music | |
| 2026 | A State of Trance 2026 | 3×CD | Armada Music | |

==== A State of Trance Year Mix series ====
- 2005 A State of Trance Year Mix 2005 (2×CD) [Armada Music]
- 2006 A State of Trance Year Mix 2006 (2×CD) [Armada Music]
- 2007 A State of Trance Year Mix 2007 (2×CD) [Armada Music]
- 2008 A State of Trance Year Mix 2008 (2×CD) [Armada Music]
- 2009 A State of Trance Year Mix 2009 (2×CD) [Armada Music]
- 2010 A State of Trance Year Mix 2010 (2×CD) [Armada Music]
- 2011 A State of Trance Year Mix 2011 (2×CD) [Armada Music]
- 2012 A State of Trance Year Mix 2012 (2×CD) [Armada Music]
- 2013 A State of Trance Year Mix 2013 (2×CD) [Armada Music]
- 2014 A State of Trance Year Mix 2004 (2×CD) [Armada Music] (released in double CD 10 years after)
- 2014 A State of Trance Year Mix 2014 (2×CD) [Armada Music]
- 2015 A State of Trance Year Mix 2015 (2×CD) [Armada Music]
- 2016 A State of Trance Year Mix 2016 (2×CD) [Armada Music]
- 2017 A State of Trance Year Mix 2017 (2×CD) [Armada Music]
- 2018 A State of Trance Year Mix 2018 (2×CD) [Armada Music]
- 2019 A State of Trance Year Mix 2019 (2×CD) [Armada Music]
- 2020 A State of Trance Year Mix 2020 (2×CD) [Armada Music]
- 2021 A State of Trance Year Mix 2021 (2×CD) [Armada Music]
- 2022 A State of Trance Year Mix 2022 (2×CD) [Armada Music]
- 2023 A State of Trance Year Mix 2023 (2×CD) [Armada Music]
- 2024 A State of Trance Year Mix 2024 (2×CD) [Armada Music]
- 2025 A State of Trance Year Mix 2025 (2×CD) [Armada Music]

==== Universal Religion series ====
- 2003 Universal Religion Chapter 1 (CD) [Armada Music]
- 2004 Universal Religion Chapter 2 (CD) [Armada Music]
- 2007 Universal Religion Chapter 3 (CD) [Armada Music]
- 2009 Universal Religion Chapter 4 (CD) [Armada Music]
- 2011 Universal Religion Chapter 5 (2×CD) [Armada Music]
- 2012 Universal Religion Chapter 6 (2×CD) [Armada Music]
- 2013 Universal Religion Chapter 7 (2×CD) [Armada Music]

==== A State of Trance Ibiza series ====
- 2014 A State of Trance Ibiza 2014 at Ushuaïa (2×CD) [Armada Music]
- 2015 A State of Trance Ibiza 2015 at Ushuaïa (2×CD) [Armada Music]
- 2016 A State of Trance Ibiza 2016 (2×CD) [Armada Music]
- 2017 A State of Trance Ibiza 2017 (2×CD) [Armada Music]
- 2018 A State of Trance Ibiza 2018 (2×CD) [Armada Music]
- 2019 A State of Trance Ibiza 2019 (2×CD) [Armada Music]
- 2020 A State of Trance Ibiza 2020 (2×CD) [Armada Music]
- 2022 A State of Trance Ibiza 2022 (2×CD) [Armada Music]
- 2023 A State of Trance Ibiza 2023 (3×CD) [Armada Music]
- 2024 A State of Trance Ibiza 2024 (3×CD) [Armada Music]
- 2025 A State of Trance Ibiza 2025 (3×CD) [Armada Music]
- 2026 A State of Trance Ibiza 2026 (3×CD) [Armada Music]

=== Video albums ===
- 2005 Armin Only – The Next Level (DVD) [Armada Music]
- 2007 Armin Only – Ahoy' 2006 (2xDVD) [Armada Music]
- 2008 Armin Only – Imagine (2xDVD) [Armada Music]
- 2009 The Music Videos 1997–2009 (DVD + CD) [Armada Music]
- 2011 Armin Only – Mirage (DVD; Blu-ray) [Armada Music]
- 2012 A Year with Armin van Buuren (DVD) [Armada Music]
- 2014 Armin Only – Intense (The Most Intense Edition) (4×CD + DVD) (intense (CD) + more intense (CD) + most intense - live from armin only (2×CD) + armin only - intense live registration & the road movie (DVD)) [Armada Music]

== Extended plays ==
List of extended plays, with selected chart positions
| Title | Extended play details | Peak chart positions | |
| Title | Extended play details | NLD | BEL |
|---|---|---|---|
| Old Skool | Released: 4 August 2016; Label: Armada Music; Format: 12" vinyl, CD, digital download | 8 | 13 |
| Blah Blah Blah | Released: 8 June 2018; Label: Armada Music; Format: Digital download | — | — |
| Trilogy (with Shapov) | Released: 12 April 2019; Label: Armada Music; Format: Digital download | — | — |
| Hollow Mask Illusion (with Avira) | Released: 18 September 2020; Label: Armind; Format: Digital download | — | — |
| Euthymia | Released: 18 December 2020; Label: Armada Music; Format: Digital download | — | — |
| Welcome Home (with Shapov) | Released: 6 May 2022; Label: Armind; Format: Digital download | — | — |
"—" denotes a recording that did not chart or was not released in that territory.

== Singles ==
=== 1990s ===
List of singles from the 1990s as lead artist, with selected chart positions, showing year released and album name
| Title | Year | Peak chart positions | | | Album |
| Title | Year | NLD | SWE | UK | Album |
|---|---|---|---|---|---|
| "Push" | 1996 | — | — | — | Non-album singles |
| "Check Out Your Mind" | 1996 | — | — | — | Non-album singles |
| "Blue Fear" | 1997 | — | — | 45 | 76 |
| "Lost Soul Society" / "Virgo" | 1999 | — | — | — | Non-album single |
| "Communication" | 1999 | 95 | — | 18 | 76 |
| "One" (as Gig) | 1999 | — | — | — | Non-album singles |
| "Free" (as Gimmick) | 1999 | — | — | — | Non-album singles |
| "Touch Me" (as Rising Star) | 1999 | — | 125 | 98 | 10 Years |
"—" denotes a recording that did not chart or was not released in that territory.

=== 2000s ===
List of singles from the 2000s as lead artist, with selected chart positions, showing year released and album name
| Title | Year | Peak chart positions | | | | | Album |
| Title | Year | NLD | BEL | GER | SWE | UK | Album |
|---|---|---|---|---|---|---|---|
| "Eternity" (Armin van Buuren and DJ Tiësto present Alibi) | 2000 | 93 | — | — | — | — | 001 A State of Trance |
| "Wonder Where You Are?" / "Wonder?" (DJ Tiësto and Armin van Buuren present Major League) | 2000 | — | — | — | — | — | Artist Profile Series 4: Boundaries of Imagination |
| "The Sound of Goodbye" (as Perpetuous Dreamer) | 2001 | 42 | — | 52 | — | 76 | 002 Basic Instinct |
| "Dust.wav" (as Perpetuous Dreamer) | 2002 | — | — | — | — | — | 004 Transparance |
| "Clear Blue Moon" / "Star Theme" (as Rising Star) | 2002 | — | — | — | — | 127 | 003 In Motion |
| "Yet Another Day" (featuring Ray Wilson) | 2002 | 34 | 14 | — | — | 70 | 76 |
| "Sunburn (Walk Through the Fire)" | 2003 | 43 | — | — | — | — | 76 |
| "Burned With Desire" (featuring Justine Suissa) | 2003 | 53 | 4 | — | — | 45 | 76 |
| "Blue Fear 2004" | 2004 | — | — | — | — | 52 | 76 |
| "Intruder/Pound" (Armin vs. M.I.K.E.) | 2004 | — | — | — | — | 144 | Universal Religion 2004 |
| "Shivers" (featuring Susana) | 2005 | 27 | — | — | — | 72 | Shivers |
| "Serenity" (featuring Jan Vayne) | 2005 | 17 | — | — | — | 72 | Shivers |
| "Who Is Watching" (featuring Nadia Ali) | 2005 | — | 19 | — | — | — | Shivers |
| "Sail" | 2006 | 27 | — | — | — | — | A State of Trance 2006 |
| "Control Freak" | 2006 | — | 18 | — | — | 191 | Shivers |
| "Love You More" (featuring Racoon) | 2006 | 23 | — | — | — | 108 | 10 Years |
| "Saturday Night" (Armin van Buuren vs. Herman Brood) | 2006 | 25 | — | — | — | — | 10 Years |
| "This World Is Watching Me" (vs. Rank 1 featuring Kush) | 2007 | 19 | — | — | — | — | 10 Years |
| "Communication Part 3" | 2007 | — | — | — | — | — | 10 Years |
| "Rush Hour" | 2007 | 30 | 13 | — | — | — | A State of Trance 2007 |
| "The Sound of Goodbye 2008" (as Perpetuous Dreamer) | 2007 | 20 | — | — | — | — | Non-album single |
| "If You Should Go" (featuring Susana) | 2008 | — | — | — | — | — | Universal Religion 2008 |
| "Going Wrong" (with DJ Shah featuring Chris Jones) | 2008 | 5 | — | — | — | — | Imagine |
| "In and Out of Love" (featuring Sharon den Adel) | 2008 | 10 | 10 | — | 56 | 198 | Imagine |
| "Unforgivable" (featuring Jaren) | 2009 | 62 | 41 | — | — | — | Imagine |
| "Fine Without You" (featuring Jennifer Rene) | 2009 | — | — | — | — | — | Imagine |
| "Never Say Never" (featuring Jacqueline Govaert) | 2009 | 32 | 28 | — | — | — | Imagine |
| "Tuvan" (as Gaia) | 2009 | — | — | — | — | — | A State of Trance 2009 |
| "Broken Tonight" (featuring VanVelzen) | 2009 | 63 | — | — | — | — | Hear Me Out |
"—" denotes a recording that did not chart or was not released in that territory.

=== 2010s ===
List of singles from the 2010s as lead artist, with selected chart positions and certifications, showing year released and album name
| Title | Year | Peak chart positions | | | | | | | | | | Certifications | Album |
| Title | Year | NLD | AUS | AUT | BEL | FRA | GER | SWE | SWI | UK | US | Certifications | Album |
|---|---|---|---|---|---|---|---|---|---|---|---|---|---|
| "Full Focus" | 2010 | 34 | — | — | — | — | — | — | — | — | — | | Mirage |
| "Not Giving Up on Love" (Armin van Buuren vs. Sophie Ellis-Bextor) | 2010 | 8 | — | — | — | — | — | — | — | 165 | — | | Mirage |
| "Remember Love" (with Paul van Dyk and Paul Oakenfold as DJ's United) | 2010 | — | — | — | — | — | — | — | — | — | — | | Vonyc Sessions 2010 and We Are Planet Perfecto, Vol. 1 |
| "Aisha" (as Gaia) | 2010 | — | — | — | — | — | — | — | — | — | — | | A State of Trance 2010 |
| "This Light Between Us" (featuring Christian Burns) | 2010 | — | — | — | — | — | — | — | — | — | — | | Mirage |
| "Drowning" (featuring Laura V) | 2011 | 41 | — | — | — | — | — | — | — | — | — | | Mirage |
| "Status Excessu D (The Official A State of Trance 500 Anthem)" (as Gaia) | 2011 | — | — | — | — | — | — | — | — | — | — | | A State of Trance 2011 |
| "Feels So Good" (featuring Nadia Ali) | 2011 | — | — | — | — | — | — | — | — | — | — | | Mirage |
| "Winter Stayed" (as Triple A) | 2011 | — | — | — | — | — | — | — | — | — | — | | A State of Trance 2011 |
| "Brute" (vs. Ferry Corsten) | 2011 | — | — | — | — | — | — | — | — | — | — | | Universal Religion Chapter 5 |
| "Stellar" (as Gaia) | 2011 | — | — | — | — | — | — | — | — | — | — | | Universal Religion Chapter 5 |
| "Youtopia" (featuring Adam Young) | 2011 | 68 | — | — | — | — | — | — | — | — | — | | Mirage |
| "Orbion" | 2012 | — | — | — | — | — | — | — | — | — | — | | Mirage |
| "J'ai Envie de Toi" (as Gaia) | 2012 | — | — | — | — | — | — | — | — | — | — | | A State of Trance 2012 |
| "Suddenly Summer" (featuring Ana Criado) | 2012 | — | — | — | — | — | — | — | — | — | — | | A State of Trance 2012 |
| "Belter" (with Orjan Nilsen) | 2012 | — | — | — | — | — | — | — | — | — | — | | A State of Trance 2012 |
| "We Are Here to Make Some Noise" | 2012 | 24 | — | — | — | — | — | — | — | — | — | | Non-album single |
| "I'll Listen" (featuring Ana Criado) | 2012 | — | — | — | — | — | — | — | — | — | — | | Universal Religion Chapter 6 |
| "Waiting for the Night" (featuring Fiora) | 2013 | 30 | — | — | — | — | — | — | — | — | — | | Intense |
| "The Expedition (ASOT 600 Anthem)" (with Markus Schulz) | 2013 | — | — | — | — | — | — | — | — | — | — | | A State of Trance 2013 |
| "Nehalennia" (with Arty) | 2013 | — | — | — | — | — | — | — | — | — | — | | A State of Trance 2013 |
| "D# Fat" (with W&W) | 2013 | — | — | — | — | — | — | — | — | — | — | | A State of Trance 2013 |
| "This Is What It Feels Like" (featuring Trevor Guthrie) | 2013 | 2 | 13 | 7 | 8 | 170 | 42 | 31 | 15 | 6 | 96 | NVPI: 2× Platinum; ARIA: Platinum; BPI: Platinum; BRMA: Gold; BVMI: Gold | Intense |
| "Beautiful Life" (featuring Cindy Alma) | 2013 | 66 | — | 17 | — | — | — | — | — | — | — | | Intense |
| "Intense" (featuring Miri Ben-Ari) | 2013 | 14 | — | — | — | — | — | — | — | — | — | | Intense |
| "Save My Night" | 2014 | 23 | — | — | — | — | — | — | — | 85 | — | | Intense |
| "Alone" (featuring Lauren Evans) | 2014 | 89 | — | — | — | — | — | — | — | — | — | | Intense |
| "Empire of Hearts" (as Gaia) | 2014 | — | — | — | — | — | — | — | — | — | — | | A State of Trance 2014 |
| "EIFORYA" (with Andrew Rayel) | 2014 | — | — | — | — | — | — | — | — | — | — | | A State of Trance 2014 |
| "Ping Pong" | 2014 | 22 | — | — | 38 | 135 | — | — | — | — | — | | A State of Trance 2014 |
| "Humming the Lights" (as Gaia) | 2014 | — | — | — | — | — | — | — | — | — | — | | Intense |
| "Hystereo" | 2014 | — | — | — | — | — | — | — | — | — | — | | A State of Trance, Ibiza 2014 |
| "Together (In a State of Trance) [ASOT 700 Anthem]" | 2015 | — | — | — | — | — | — | — | — | — | — | | A State of Trance 2015 |
| "Safe Inside You" (as Rising Star featuring Betsie Larkin) | 2015 | — | — | — | — | — | — | — | — | — | — | | A State of Trance 2015 |
| "Carnation" (as Gaia) | 2015 | — | — | — | — | — | — | — | — | — | — | | A State of Trance 2015 |
| "Panta Rhei" (with Mark Sixma) | 2015 | — | — | — | — | — | — | — | — | — | — | | A State of Trance 2015 |
| "In Principio" (as Gaia) | 2015 | — | — | — | — | — | — | — | — | — | — | | A State of Trance 2015 |
| "Another You" (featuring Mr Probz) | 2015 | 7 | 48 | 10 | — | 81 | 75 | 55 | — | — | — | NVPI: Platinum; GLF: Gold | Embrace |
| "Stardust" (with Jean Michel Jarre) | 2015 | — | — | — | — | 180 | — | — | — | — | — | | Electronica 1: The Time Machine |
| "Off the Hook" (with Hardwell) | 2015 | — | — | — | 51 | — | — | — | — | — | — | | Embrace |
| "Strong Ones" (featuring Cimo Fränkel) | 2015 | 59 | — | — | 23 | — | — | — | — | — | — | | Embrace |
| "If It Ain't Dutch" (with W&W) | 2015 | — | — | — | — | — | — | — | — | — | — | | The Best of Armin Only |
| "Inyathi" (as Gaia) | 2016 | — | — | — | — | — | — | — | — | — | — | | A State of Trance 2016 |
| "Heading Up High" (featuring Kensington) | 2016 | 35 | — | — | — | — | — | — | — | — | — | NVPI: Platinum | Embrace |
| "Freefall" (featuring BullySongs) | 2016 | — | — | — | — | — | — | — | — | — | — | | Embrace |
| "Make It Right" (featuring Angel Taylor) | 2016 | — | — | — | — | — | — | — | — | — | — | | Embrace |
| "The Race" (with Dave Winnel) | 2016 | — | — | — | — | — | — | — | — | — | — | | A State of Trance, Ibiza 2016 |
| "Flashlight" (with Orjan Nilsen) | 2016 | — | — | — | — | — | — | — | — | — | — | | A State of Trance, Ibiza 2016 |
| "I Live for That Energy (ASOT 800 Anthem)" | 2016 | — | — | — | — | — | — | — | — | — | — | | A State of Trance 2017 |
| "Great Spirit" (versus Vini Vici featuring Hilight Tribe) | 2016 | — | — | — | — | — | — | — | — | — | — | NVPI: Gold; BVMI: Gold; GLF: Platinum | The Best of Armin Only |
| "I Need You" (with Garibay featuring Olaf Blackwood) | 2017 | 31 | — | 54 | — | — | — | — | — | — | — | NVPI: Platinum | Balance |
| "This Is a Test" / "The Train" | 2017 | — | — | — | — | — | — | — | — | — | — | | A State of Trance 2017 |
| "My Symphony (The Best of Armin Only Anthem)" | 2017 | — | — | — | — | — | — | — | — | — | — | | The Best of Armin Only |
| "Sunny Days" (featuring Josh Cumbee) | 2017 | 19 | — | — | 87 | — | — | — | — | — | — | NVPI: 2× Platinum | Balance |
| "Saint Vitus" (as Gaia) | 2017 | — | — | — | — | — | — | — | — | — | — | | A State of Trance 2017 |
| "Crossfire" (as Gaia) | 2017 | — | — | — | — | — | — | — | — | — | — | | A State of Trance, Ibiza 2017 |
| "You Are" (with Sunnery James & Ryan Marciano) | 2017 | — | — | — | — | — | — | — | — | — | — | | A State of Trance, Ibiza 2017 |
| "Be in the Moment (ASOT 850 Anthem)" | 2017 | — | — | — | — | — | — | — | — | — | — | | A State of Trance 2018 |
| "Sex, Love & Water" (featuring Conrad Sewell) | 2018 | 93 | — | — | 75 | — | — | — | — | — | — | | Balance |
| "Therapy" (featuring James Newman) | 2018 | 26 | — | — | — | — | — | — | — | — | — | NVPI: Platinum | Balance |
| "Blah Blah Blah" | 2018 | 35 | — | 15 | 19 | 25 | 11 | 25 | 44 | — | — | NVPI: Gold; BPI: Silver; BRMA: Gold; BVMI: 3× Gold; RIAA: Gold; SNEP: Platinum | Blah Blah Blah EP and Balance |
| "The Last Dancer" (with Shapov) | 2018 | — | — | — | — | — | — | — | — | — | — | | Trilogy |
| "Our Origin" (with Shapov) | 2018 | — | — | — | — | — | — | — | — | — | — | | Trilogy |
| "United" (with Vini Vici and Alok featuring Zafrir) | 2018 | — | — | — | — | — | — | — | — | — | — | | A State of Trance, Ibiza 2018 |
| "Wild Wild Son" (featuring Sam Martin) | 2018 | 41 | — | — | 77 | — | — | — | — | — | — | NVPI: Platinum | Balance |
| "Lifting You Higher (ASOT 900 Anthem)" | 2018 | — | — | — | — | — | — | — | — | — | — | | A State of Trance 2019 |
| "Ready to Rave" (with W&W) | 2018 | — | — | — | — | — | — | — | — | — | — | | Non-album singles |
| "Repeat After Me" (with Dimitri Vegas, Like Mike and W&W) | 2019 | — | — | — | — | — | — | — | — | — | — | | Non-album singles |
| "Lonely for You" (featuring Bonnie McKee) | 2019 | — | — | — | — | — | — | — | — | — | — | | Balance |
| "Show Me Love" (with Above & Beyond) | 2019 | — | — | — | — | — | — | — | — | — | — | | Balance |
| "Turn It Up" | 2019 | — | — | — | — | 148 | — | — | — | — | — | | Balance |
| "Don't Give Up on Me" (with Lucas & Steve featuring Josh Cumbee) | 2019 | — | — | — | — | — | — | — | — | — | — | | Balance |
| "La Résistance de l'Amour" (vs. Shapov) | 2019 | — | — | — | — | — | — | — | — | — | — | | Trilogy and Balance |
| "Phone Down" (with Garibay) | 2019 | — | — | — | — | — | — | — | — | — | — | | Balance |
| "Hoe het danst" (with Marco Borsato and Davina Michelle) | 2019 | 2 | — | — | 1 | — | — | — | — | — | — | NVPI: 3× Platinum; BRMA: 6× Platinum | Non-album single |
| "Revolution" (with Luke Bond featuring Karra) | 2019 | — | — | — | — | — | — | — | — | — | — | | Balance |
| "Something Real" (with Avian Grays featuring Jordan Shaw) | 2019 | — | — | — | — | — | — | — | — | — | — | | Balance |
| "Cosmos" (as Rising Star featuring Alexandra Badoi) | 2019 | — | — | — | — | — | — | — | — | — | — | | A State of Trance, Ibiza 2019 |
| "Stickup" | 2019 | — | — | — | — | — | — | — | — | — | — | | Balance |
| "Unlove You" (featuring Ne-Yo) | 2019 | — | — | — | 64 | — | — | — | — | — | — | | Balance |
| "Let the Music Guide You (ASOT 950 Anthem)" | 2019 | — | — | — | — | — | — | — | — | — | — | | Non-album single |
"—" denotes a recording that did not chart or was not released in that territory.

=== 2020s ===
List of singles from the 2020s as lead artist, with selected chart positions and certifications, showing year released and album name
| Title | Year | Peak chart positions | Certifications | Album |
| Title | Year | NLD | Certifications | Album |
|---|---|---|---|---|
| "Leka" (with Super8 & Tab) | 2020 | — | | A State of Trance 2020 |
| "This I Vow" (with MaRLo featuring Mila Josef) | 2020 | — | | A State of Trance 2020 |
| "Still Better Off" (with Tom Staar featuring Mosimann) | 2020 | — | | A State of Trance 2020 |
| "Punisher" (with Fatum) | 2020 | — | | A State of Trance 2020 |
| "All On Me" (with Brennan Heart featuring Andreas Moe) | 2020 | — | | Non-album singles |
| "Tarzan" (with Blasterjaxx) | 2020 | — | | Non-album singles |
| "Boom Boom" (with Jamis) | 2020 | — | | Non-album singles |
| "Hollow" (with Avira featuring Be No Rain) | 2020 | — | | Hollow Mask Illusion |
| "I Need You to Know" (with Nicky Romero featuring Ifimay) | 2020 | — | | A State of Trance, Ibiza 2020 |
| "Illusion" (with Avira) | 2020 | — | | Hollow Mask Illusion |
| "The Voice" (as Rising Star featuring Cari) | 2020 | — | | A State of Trance, Ibiza 2020 |
| "Que Pasa" (with D'Angello & Francis) | 2020 | — | | A State of Trance, Ibiza 2020 |
| "Mask" (with Avira featuring Sam Martin) | 2020 | — | | Hollow Mask Illusion |
| "Need You Now" (featuring Jake Reese) | 2020 | — | | Euthymia EP |
| "Feel Something" (featuring Duncan Laurence) | 2020 | 33 | | Small Town Boy and Euthymia EP |
| "Christmas Time" (with Dimitri Vegas & Like Mike and Brennan Heart featuring Jeremy Oceans) | 2020 | — | | Home Alone Christmas EP |
| "Should I Wait" (with Avalan) | 2020 | — | | Euthymia EP |
| "Turn the World into a Dancefloor (ASOT 1000 Anthem)" | 2021 | — | | A State of Trance Forever |
| "Leave a Little Love" (with Alesso) | 2021 | 62 | NVPI: Gold | Non-album single |
| "Magico" (with Giuseppe Ottaviani) | 2021 | — | | A State of Trance Forever |
| "Weight Of The World" (featuring Rblvn) | 2021 | — | | Non-album single |
| "Divino" (with Maor Levi) | 2021 | — | | A State of Trance Forever |
| "Tell Me Why" (featuring Sarah Reeves) | 2021 | — | | A State of Trance 2021 |
| "Let Go" (with Tom Staar featuring Josha Daniel) | 2021 | — | | A State of Trance Forever |
| "Battlefield" | 2021 | — | | A State of Trance 2021 |
| "Jonson's Play" (with Sander van Doorn) | 2021 | — | | A State of Trance Forever |
| "Goodbye" (featuring Skoles) | 2021 | — | | Non-album singles |
| "I Should Be Loving You" (with DubVision featuring You) | 2021 | — | | Non-album singles |
| "Lost in Space" (with Jorn van Deynhoven) | 2021 | — | | A State of Trance Forever |
| "The Greater Light to Rule the Night" (with Rank 1) | 2021 | — | | A State of Trance Forever |
| "Sirius" (with Avira) | 2021 | ― | | A State of Trance Forever |
| "Anita" (with Timmy Trumpet) | 2021 | ― | | Non-album singles |
| "Hold On" (with Davina Michelle) | 2021 | 34 | NVPI: Gold | Non-album singles |
| "Music Means Love Forever" (with Steve Aoki) | 2021 | ― | | Non-album singles |
| "Yama" (with Vini Vici featuring Tribal Dance and Natalie Wamba) | 2021 | — | | Non-album singles |
| "No Fun" (with The Stickmen Project) | 2021 | — | | Feel Again |
| "Soundscape" | 2021 | — | | Non-album single |
| "Human Touch" (with Sam Gray) | 2022 | — | | Feel Again |
| "We Can Dance Again" (with Reinier Zonneveld and Roland Clark) | 2022 | — | | A State of Trance 2022 |
| "Love We Lost" (with R3hab featuring Simon Ward) | 2022 | — | | Feel Again |
| "Come Around Again" (with Billen Ted featuring JC Stewart) | 2022 | 75 | ZPAV: Gold | Feel Again |
| "Echoes" (with Florentin featuring Jordan Grace) | 2022 | — | | A State of Trance 2022 |
| "One More Time" (featuring Maia Wright) | 2022 | — (Note: "One More Time" did not enter the Dutch Single Top 100, but peaked at number 16 on the Single Tip chart.) | | Feel Again |
| "Reflexion (ASOT 2023 Anthem)" (with Cosmic Gate) | 2023 | — | | Feel Again |
| "On & On" (with Punctual featuring Alika) | 2023 | — | | Feel Again |
| "When We Come Alive" (with Vini Vici featuring Alba) | 2023 | — | | Breathe In |
| "Fire with Fire" (with HRRTZ featuring Julia Church) | 2023 | — | | Breathe In |
| "Motive" | 2023 | — | | Breathe In |
| "Bed of Rain" (featuring Mila Josef) | 2023 | — | | Breathe In |
| "Space Case" | 2023 | — | | Breathe In |
| "Lose This Feeling" | 2023 | — | | Breathe In |
| "Love Is a Drug" (featuring Anne Gudrun) | 2023 | — | | Breathe In |
| "Destination (ASOT 2024 Anthem)" (with Ferry Corsten, Rank 1 and Ruben de Ronde) | 2023 | — | | Breathe In |
| "Forever (Stay Like This)" (with Goodboys) | 2024 | — | | Breathe |
| "What Took You So Long" (with Gryffin) | 2024 | — | | Breathe and Pulse |
| "Larger than Life" (with Chef'Special) | 2024 | 36 | NVPI: Gold | Breathe |
| "In the Dark" (with David Guetta featuring Aldae) | 2024 | — (Note: "In the Dark" did not enter the Dutch Single Top 100, but peaked at number nine on the Single Tip chart.) | | Breathe |
| "Love" (with Omnia) | 2024 | — | | Breathe |
| "Love Is Eternity" (with Agents of Time featuring Orkid) | 2024 | — | | Breathe |
| "Part of Me" (featuring Louis III) | 2024 | — | | Breathe |
| "Pulstar" | 2024 | — | | Breathe |
| "Freedom" (with Oliver Heldens featuring Sam Harper) | 2024 | — | | Breathe |
| "Late Checkout" (with W&W) | 2024 | — | | Breathe |
| "Follow the Light" (with Hardwell) | 2025 | — | | Breathe |
| "Extreme Ways" (with Moby) | 2025 | — | | Breathe |
| "Now Love Will Begin" (with HI-LO) | 2025 | — | | Breathe |
| "Take Off" (with ARTBAT) | 2025 | — | | Breathe |
| "City Lights" (with VIZE X Leony) | 2025 | — | | Breathe |
| "Freedom's Call" | 2025 | — | | Breathe |
| "Viva l'Opera" (with Natalie Gioia) | 2025 | — | | Breathe |
| "Inevitable" (featuring Greylee) | 2025 | — | | Breathe |
| "High On Love" (with Anne Gudrun) | 2025 | — | | Breathe |
| "Euphoria" (with Alok, Norma Jean Martine and Lawrent) | 2025 | — | | Breathe |
| "Sound of You" (with Rob Swire) | 2025 | — | | Breathe |
| "Is It Beautiful? (A State of Trance 2025 Transformation Anthem)" (with Ben Hemsley featuring Lucy Pullin) | 2025 | — | | Breathe |
| "Alive" | 2025 | — | | Breathe |
| "Sarabande" (with Vinci Vici featuring Anna Timofei) | 2025 | — | | Breathe |
| "Sweet Escape" (with Lucky Lou) | 2025 | — | | Breathe |
| "By Now" (with D.O.D. featuring Laura Welsh) | 2025 | — | | Breathe |
| "Keep The Faith" (with Bon Jovi) | 2025 | — | | Breathe |
| "Let It Be For Love" (featuring JAI RYU) | 2025 | — | | Breathe |
| "Dream a Little Dream" (with Sam Gray) | 2025 | — | | Breathe |
| "Bach to the Future" (with BLR; samples "Toccata and Fugue in D minor, BWV 565") | 2025 | — | | Breathe |
| "Gimme the Love" (with Seth Hills featuring Alessia Labate) | 2025 | — | | Breathe |
| "Angels" (with Punctual featuring EVALINA) | 2025 | — | | Breathe |
| "Heavy" (with JOA) | 2025 | — | | Non-album single |
| "Sleepless Nights" (with Martin Garrix featuring Libby Whitehouse) | 2025 | — (Note: "Sleepless Nights" did not enter the Dutch Single Top 100, but peaked at number 15 on the Single Tip chart.) | | Origo |
| "Set Me Free" (with Sacha) | 2025 | — (Note: "Set Me Free" did not enter the Dutch Single Top 100, but peaked at number 30 on the Single Tip chart.) | | Non-album singles |
| "Put Your Bassline" (with KI/KI) | 2025 | — | | Non-album singles |
| "Sun Shines on Me" (with Glockenbach) | 2026 | — | | Non-album singles |
| "Mouth Go Lala" (with Maddix featuring Caroline Roxy) | 2026 | — | | Non-album singles |
| "Always You (A State of Trance 2026 Elevation Anthem)" (with Richard Durand and Dicosis) | 2026 | — | | A State of Trance 2026 |
| "Lost in Time" (with Alle Farben featuring Rosy) | 2026 | — | | Non-album singles |
| "Ven Comigo" (with Olive Anguz) | 2026 | — | | Non-album singles |
| "Like a Child" (with Argy featuring Marlo Rex) | 2026 | — | | Non-album singles |
| "She a Freak" (with Skytech) | 2026 | — | | A State of Trance 2026 |
| "Serendipity" (with Andrew Bayer) | 2026 | — | | A State of Trance 2026 |
| "U Got 2 Know" (with Hannah Laing and Wippenberg) | 2026 | — | | A State of Trance 2026 |
| "No Mercy" (with Adam Beyer) | 2026 | — | | Non-album singles |
| "Here in My Arms (Enjoy the Silence)" (with Silver Panda) | 2026 | — | | Non-album singles |
| "Everlasting" (with Sacha) | 2026 | — (Note: "Everlasting" did not enter the Dutch Single Top 100, but peaked at number 30 on the Single Tip chart.) | | Non-album singles |
| "Burn It Up" (with Diøn featuring Scrufizzer) | 2026 | — | | Non-album singles |
| "Starbound" (with ASTRON4UT) | 2026 | — | | Non-album singles |
| "Toca's Miracle" (with Pete Tong and Poppy Baskcomb) | 2026 | — | | Non-album singles |
| "Take Me Home" (featuring Poppy Baskcomb) | 2026 | — | | Non-album singles |
| "Nirvana" (with Funk Tribu) | 2026 | — | | Non-album singles |
| "What If I Told You" (with Douwe Bob) | 2026 | 80 | | Non-album singles |
| "Go All Night" (with Mary Jensen) | 2026 | — | | |
"—" denotes a recording that did not chart or was not released in that territory.

=== Promotional singles ===
List of singles as featured artist, showing year released and album name
| Title | Year | Album |
|---|---|---|
| "Embargo" (with Cosmic Gate) | 2015 | Embrace |
| "Hands to Heaven" (featuring Rock Mafia) | 2015 | Embrace |
| "Dominator" (vs. Human Resource) | 2016 | Old Skool |
| "The Ultimate Seduction" (vs. The Ultimate Seduction) | 2016 | Old Skool |
| "Pull Over" (vs. Speedy J) | 2016 | Old Skool |
| "Waking Up with You" (featuring David Hodges) | 2019 | Balance |
| "Mr. Navigator" (with Tempo Giusto) | 2019 | Balance |
| "It Could Be" (with Inner City) | 2019 | Balance |
| "High on Your Love" (featuring James Newman) | 2019 | Balance |
| "Don't Let Me Go" (featuring Matluck) | 2019 | Balance |
| "All Comes Down" (featuring Cimo Fränkel) | 2019 | Balance |
| "Million Voices" | 2019 | Balance |
| "Forever & Always" (with Gareth Emery featuring Owl City) | 2022 | Feel Again |
| "Clap" | 2022 | Feel Again |
| "Computers Take Over the World" | 2022 | Feel Again |
| "Live on Love" (with Diane Warren featuring My Marianne) | 2022 | Feel Again |
| "Hey (I Miss You)" (featuring Simon Ward) | 2022 | Feel Again |
| "Roll The Dice" (featuring Philip Strand) | 2022 | Feel Again |
| "Tocando El Sol" (with Azteck) | 2022 | Feel Again |
| "Typically Dutch" (with Wildstylez featuring PollyAnna) | 2022 | Feel Again |
| "Offshore" (with Avira and Chicane) | 2022 | Feel Again |
| "Feel Again" (featuring Wrabel) | 2022 | Feel Again |
| "Superman" (with Blasterjaxx featuring 24h) | 2022 | Feel Again |
| "Dayglow" (featuring Stuart Crichton) | 2023 | Feel Again |
| "La Bomba" (vs. Blasterjaxx) | 2023 | Feel Again |
| "Vulnerable" (featuring Vanessa Campagna) | 2023 | Feel Again |
| "Easy to Love" (with Matoma featuring Teddy Swims) | 2023 | Feel Again |
| "God Is in the Soundwaves" (with Xoro featuring Yola Recoba) | 2023 | Breathe In |
| "Make It Count" (with Just_us) | 2023 | Breathe In |
"—" denotes a recording that did not chart or was not released in that territory.

== Aliases ==
- Alibi (with Tiësto)
- DJ's United (with Paul van Dyk & Paul Oakenfold)
- Gaia (with Benno De Goeij)
- Gimmick
- Major League (with Tiësto)
- Perpetuous Dreamer
- Rising Star
- Triple A

== Remixes ==
=== As lead artist ===
List of remixes, showing original artists and year released
| Title | Year | Original artists |
|---|---|---|
| "King of My Castle" (Armin van Buuren Vocal Remix) | 1998 | Wamdue Project |
| "Blame the Music" (Armin van Buuren Mix) | 1999 | Electrix |
| "C'est Musique" (Armin van Buuren Mix) | 1999 | Shane |
| "Gettaway" (Armin van Buuren Remix) | 1999 | Electrix |
| "Dido" (Armin Van Buuren's Universal Religion Mix) | 1999 | Aria |
| "Devotion" (Armin van Buuren Remix) | 2000 | Yahel |
| "Viola" (Armin van Buuren Remix) | 2000 | Moogwai |
| "Exhale" (Armin van Buuren Remix) | 2001 | System F (featuring Armin van Buuren) |
| "Appears" (Armin van Buuren Sunset Dub Mix) | 2001 | Ayumi Hamasaki |
| "Rapture" (Armin van Buuren Remix) | 2001 | iiO |
| "The Sound Of Goodbye" (Armin's Tribal Feel Mix) | 2001 | Perpetuous Dreamer |
| "Janeiro" (Armin van Buuren Remix) | 2002 | Solid Sessions |
| "Too Late to Turn" (Armin van Buuren Remix) | 2002 | Shane |
| "Time Is the Healer" (Armin van Buuren Remix) | 2002 | Riva |
| "Positron" (Armin van Buuren Remix) | 2002 | Cygnus X |
| "Seven Cities" (Armin van Buuren Remix) | 2002 | Solarstone |
| "Sky Falls Down" (Armin van Buuren Remix) | 2003 | Above & Beyond presents OceanLab |
| "Give Me an Answer" (Armin van Buuren Remix) | 2003 | Ben Liebrand |
| "Mushroom Therapy" (Armin van Buuren Remix) | 2003 | Mark Otten |
| "As the Rush Comes" (Armin van Buuren Universal Religion Mix) | 2004 | Motorcycle |
| "The Longest Day" (Armin van Buuren Mix) | 2004 | Sean Callery |
| "Inertia" (Armin van Buuren Remix) | 2005 | Fragile (featuring Alex Lemon) |
| "Something For the People" (Armin van Buuren, DJ Remy and Roland Klinkenberg Remix) | 2007 | Tony Scott |
| "Human" (Armin van Buuren Remix) | 2008 | The Killers |
| "Walking on Air" (Armin van Buuren Remix) | 2008 | Kerli |
| "Every Other Way" (Armin van Buuren Remix) | 2009 | BT (featuring JES) |
| "Beggin' You" (Armin van Buuren Remix) | 2009 | Cerf, Mitiska & Jaren |
| "Not Going Home" (Armin van Buuren Remix) | 2010 | Faithless |
| "Everything to Lose" (Armin van Buuren Remix) | 2010 | Dido |
| "Júrame" (Armin van Buuren Remix) | 2010 | Miguel Bosé |
| "Where Do I Start" (Armin van Buuren Remix) | 2010 | Chicane |
| "Use Somebody" (Armin van Buuren Rework) | 2011 | Laura Jansen |
| "Put Your Hands Up" (Armin van Buuren Remix) | 2011 | Nadine Coyle |
| "Falling Away" (Armin van Buuren Remix) | 2011 | Hannah |
| "Colours" (Armin van Buuren Remix) | 2011 | Emma Hewitt |
| "Without You" (Armin van Buuren Remix) | 2011 | David Guetta (featuring Usher) |
| "Nova Zembla" (Armin van Buuren Remix) | 2011 | Wiegel Meirmans Snitker |
| "Brute" (Armin's Illegal Drum Edit) | 2011 | Ferry Corsten vs. Armin van Buuren |
| "Twilight" (Armin van Buuren Remix) | 2012 | Kirsty |
| "Spectrum" (Armin van Buuren Remix) | 2012 | Zedd (featuring Matthew Koma) |
| "The Killing" (Armin van Buuren Remix) | 2012 | Frans Bak (featuring Josefine Cronholm) |
| "Downpipe" (Armin van Buuren Remix) | 2013 | Mark Knight and D. Ramirez vs. Underworld |
| "Siren" (Armin van Buuren Remix) | 2013 | Kat Krazy (featuring elkka) |
| "Enjoy the Ride" (Armin van Buuren Remix) | 2014 | Krewella |
| "Let It Go" (Armin van Buuren Remix) | 2014 | Idina Menzel |
| "Game of Thrones Theme" (Armin van Buuren Remix) | 2015 | Ramin Djawadi |
| "We Come 1 2.0" (Armin van Buuren Remix) | 2015 | Faithless |
| "United We Are" (Armin van Buuren Remix) | 2015 | Hardwell (featuring Amba Shepherd) |
| "Again" (Armin van Buuren Remix) | 2016 | Rising Star (featuring Betsie Larkin) |
| "Jump" (Armin van Buuren Remix) | 2019 | Van Halen |
| "I Love My Friends" (Armin van Buuren and Avian Grays Remix) | 2020 | Steve Aoki and Icona Pop |
| "Pull Me Closer" (Armin van Buuren Remix) | 2021 | Dimitri Vegas |
| "Love Is Gone" (Armin van Buuren Remix) | 2021 | Slander and Dylan Matthew |
| "Transmission" (Armin van Buuren Remix) | 2023 | Eelke Kleijn |

- Shouse & David Guetta - "Live Without Love" (Armin van Buuren Remix) [2023]
- D.O.D. - "So Much In Love" (Armin van Buuren Remix) [2023]
- Sia - "Gimme Love" (Armin van Buuren Remix - Radio Edit) [2023]
- Sia - "Gimme Love" (Armin van Buuren Remix - Club Mix) [2023]
- Seven Lions & Illenium - "Not Even Love" (Armin van Buuren Remix) [2024]
- Elley Duhé & Whethan - "MONEY ON THE DASH" (Armin van Buuren Remix) [2024]
- Dillon Francis & DJ Snake - "Get Low" (Armin van Buuren Remix)[2024]
- Camisra & Armin van Buuren - "Let Me Show You" [2024]
- Moby & Armin van Buuren - "Extreme Ways" [2024]
- Kesha - "DELUSIONAL." (Armin van Buuren Extended Club Remix) [2026]

=== Club, VIP, Festival Mixes and other versions to his own songs ===
- Armin van Buuren & Fernando Garibay feat. Olaf Blackwood - «I Need You» (Club Mix)
- Armin van Buuren & Fernando Garibay feat. Olaf Blackwood - «I Need You» [Miami Edit]
- Armin van Buuren feat. Sharon den Adel - «In and Out of Love» (2017 Revision)
- Armin van Buuren - «Orbion» (2017 Revision)
- Armin van Buuren vs Human Resource - «Dominator» (Festival Mix)
- Armin van Buuren feat. Josh Cumbee - «Sunny Days» (Club Mix)
- Armin van Buuren Feat. Conrad Sewell - «Sex, Love & Water» (Club Mix)
- Armin van Buuren Feat. James Newman - «Therapy» (Club Mix)
- Armin van Buuren feat. Sam Martin - «Wild Wild Son» (Club Mix)
- Armin van Buuren feat. Bonnie McKee - «Lonely for You» (Club Mix)
- Armin van Buuren x Lucas & Steve feat. Josh Cumbee - «Don't Give Up on Me» (Club Mix)
- Armin van Buuren x Lucas & Steve feat. Josh Cumbee - «Don't Give Up on Me» (Trance Mix)
- Armin van Buuren & Garibay - «Phone Down» (Club Mix)
- Armin van Buuren & Luke Bond feat. Karra - «Revolution» (Side-and-Chain Cinematic Intro Version)
- Armin van Buuren feat. Cimo Fränkel - «All Comes Down» (Acoustic Version)
- Armin van Buuren feat. Ne-Yo - «Unlove You» (Club Mix)
- Armin van Buuren & Fatum - «Punisher» (Side-and-Chain Cinematic Intro Version)
- Armin van Buuren & Avian Grays feat. Jordan Shaw - «Something Real» (Acoustic Version)
- Armin van Buuren & Brennan Heart feat. Andreas Moe - «All On Me» (Acoustic Version)
- Armin van Buuren & Fatum vs Armin van Buuren & Brennan Heart & Andreas Moe - «Punisher» vs «All On Me» (Armin van Buuren Mashup)
- Dimitri Vegas & Like Mike x Armin van Buuren x Brennan Heart ft. Jeremy Oceans - «Christmas Time» (Live Acoustic)
- Dimitri Vegas & Like Mike x Armin van Buuren x Brennan Heart ft. Jeremy Oceans - «Christmas Time» (Instrumental)
- Alesso & Armin van Buuren - «Leave a Little Love» (Club Mix)
- Armin van Buuren feat. RBVLN - «Weight of the World» (Club Mix)
- Armin van Buuren & Davina Michelle - «Hold On» (Club Mix)
- Armin van Buuren & Sam Gray - «Human Touch» (Club Mix)
- Armin van Buuren & R3HAB feat. Simon Ward - «Love We Lost» (VIP Mix)
- Armin van Buuren feat. Wrabel - «Feel Again» (Club Mix)
- Armin van Buuren & Wildstylez feat. PollyAnna - «Typically Dutch» (VIP Mix)
- Armin van Buuren & Matoma feat. Teddy Swims - «Easy To Love» (Armin van Buuren Club Mix)
- Armin van Buuren - «Motive» (Club Mix)
- Armin van Buuren & Goodboys - «Forever (Stay Like This)» [Club Mix]
- Armin van Buuren & Punctual feat. EVALINA - «Angels» [VIP Mix]

== Rising Star Remixes ==
- Tiësto and Armin van Buuren presents Alibi – "Eternity" (Armin van Buuren's Rising Star Mix)
- Ayumi Hamasaki – "Appears" (Armin van Buuren's Rising Star 12" Instr. Mix) / (Armin van Buuren's Rising Star Vocal Mix) / (Armin van Buuren's Rising Star Remix)
- Armin van Buuren featuring Susana – "Shivers" (Rising Star Mix)
- CJ Stone – "Shining Star" (Rising Star Mix)
- Armin van Buuren featuring Ray Wilson – "Yet Another Day" (Rising Star Mix)
- Gouryella – "Walhalla" (Armin van Buuren's Rising Star Mix) / (Armin van Buuren's Rising Star Dub)
- DJ Manta – "Holding On" (Armin van Buuren's Rising Star Mix)
- Jean-Michel Jarre and Armin van Buuren – "Stardust" (Rising Star Remix)
- Armin van Buuren and Avalan – "Should I Wait" (Rising Star Remix)
- Airscape – "L'Esperanza" (Armin van Buuren's Rising Star Mix)
- Armin van Buuren presents Perpetuous Dreamer - "The Sound Of Goodbye" (Rising Star Remix)
- Armin van Buuren and Susana - Home With You (Rising Star Remix)
- Armin van Buuren presents Perpetuous Dreamer - "Dust.Wav" (Rising Star Remix)
- CJ Stone - "Shining Star" (Rising Star Remix)
- Armin van Buuren featuring Justine Suissa - "Burned With Desire" (Rising Star Remix)
- Armin van Buuren & SACHA - Set Me Free (Rising Star Remix)
- Armin van Buuren - Sonic Samba (Rising Star Remix)
- Armin van Buuren x Glockenbach - Sun Shines On Me (Rising Star Remix)
- Novaskotia - Novaskotia (Rising Star Remix)
- Desiderio - Starlight (Rising Star Remix)
- Denzil & Dwayne - Force Of Habit (Rising Star Remix)
- Vincent de Moor - Between 2 Fire (Armin van Buuren's Rising Star Remix)
- ATFC pres. OnePhatDeeva featuring Lisa Millet - Bad Habit (Armin van Buuren's Rising Star Remix)
- Armin van Buuren & SACHA - Everlasting (Rising Star Remix)
- Armin van Buuren - Take Me Home (Rising Star Remix)

== Productions ==
=== Production and songwriting credits ===
| Year | Title | Artist | Álbum | Participation | Label | Release date |
|---|---|---|---|---|---|---|
| 2012 | See My Tears | Machine Gun Kelly | Lace Up | Production | Universal Music Group | 9 October 2012 |
| 2014 | Terminal | Ayumi Hamasaki | Colours | Production | Avex Trax | 1 October 2014 |
