= Phone Down =

Phone Down may refer to:

- "Phone Down" (Lost Kings song), 2016, featuring Emily Warren
- "Phone Down" (Stefflon Don and Lil Baby song), 2019
- "Phone Down" (Armin van Buuren & Garibay song), 2019

== See also ==
- Pick Up the Phone (disambiguation)
