= Larger than Life =

Larger than Life may refer to:

== Film and television ==
- Larger than Life (film), a 1996 American comedy
- Larger than Life, a 1998 short film by Ellory Elkayem
- Carol Channing: Larger than Life, a 2012 documentary about Carol Channing
- "Larger than Life" (House), a television episode

== Literature ==
- Larger than Life (novel), a 1960 novel by Dino Buzzati
- "Larger than Life", an essay on E. E. "Doc" Smith by Robert A. Heinlein, in Heinlein's 1980 collection Expanded Universe

== Theatre ==
- Larger than Life, an adaptation of Somerset Maugham's Theatre (novel)

== Music ==
=== Albums ===
- Larger than Life (mixtape), by Brent Faiyaz, 2023
- Larger than Life (Freddie King album), by Freddie King, 1975
- Larger than Life (Jody Watley album), 1989
- Larger than Life (EP), by Paragon, 2008
- Larger than Life (The Ten Tenors album), 2004

=== Songs ===
- "Larger than Life" (Backstreet Boys song), 1999
- "Larger than Life" (Armin van Buuren and Chef'Special song), 2024
- "Larger than Life", by They Might Be Giants, a B-side of I Palindrome I, 1992
- "Larger than Life", by Denzel Curry from Melt My Eyez See Your Future, 2022
- "Larger than Life", by Downhere from Downhere, 2001
- "Larger than Life", by the Feelers from Playground Battle, 2003
- "Larger than Life", by Gov't Mule from Dose, 1998
- "Larger than Life", by Kiss from Alive II, 1977
- "Larger than Life", by Leslie Phillips from Black and White in a Grey World, 1985
- "Larger than Life", by Lita Ford from Dangerous Curves, 1991
- "Larger than Life", by Sonata Arctica from Pariah's Child, 2014
