= Phone Down (Armin van Buuren & Garibay song) =

2019 song by Armin van Buuren and Garibay

Single by Armin van Buuren and Garibay

from the album Balance
- Released: 19 April 2019
- Genre: Dance-pop; electropop; tropical house; progressive trance (club mix)
- Length: 3:12 (original); 5:46 (extended club mix)
- Label: Armada Music
- Songwriters: Armin van Buuren; Benno de Goeij; Fernando Garibay; Justin Stein; Ramiro Padilla
- Producers: Armin van Buuren; Benno de Goeij; Garibay; Ramiro Padilla

Armin van Buuren singles chronology
"Turn It Up" (2019)	"Phone Down" (2019)	"Hoe het danst" (2019)

Garibay singles chronology
"Last Summer" (2018)	"Phone Down" (2019)	"G Paradise" (2020)

Music video
- "Phone Down" on YouTube

"Phone Down" is a song by Dutch DJ and record producer Armin van Buuren and American record producer Garibay, featuring uncredited vocals from American singer-songwriter Justin Stein. It was released on 19 April 2019 through Armada Music as a single from van Buuren's seventh studio album, Balance. The song marked the second collaboration between van Buuren and Garibay, following their 2017 single "I Need You".

== Background and composition ==
"Phone Down" was released after van Buuren and Garibay's earlier collaboration "I Need You", which featured Olaf Blackwood. Van Buuren's official website described the single as a pop-dance crossover built around catchy rhythms, relatable lyrics and upbeat piano chords. The song is lyrically centred on the emotional aftermath of a break-up and the difficulty of disconnecting from a phone while thinking about another person.

The track runs for three minutes and twelve seconds. Deezer credits Armin van Buuren, Justin Stein, Fernando Garibay, Benno de Goeij and Ramiro Padilla as composers. Apple Music credits Stein with vocals on the song.

== Release and remixes ==
The original single was released by Armada Music on 19 April 2019. A club mix was released on 26 April 2019 through Armind. Van Buuren's website described the club mix as a trance-oriented version of the cross-genre original and stated that it was one of the features on the A State of Trance 2019 mix album.

A remix package was released on 14 June 2019 through Armind, with remixes by OFFAIAH, BRKLYN, Andrelli and Jorn van Deynhoven.

== Critical reception ==
Kat Bein of Billboard described "Phone Down" as a dance-pop track focused on connection, noting the return of van Buuren and Garibay after their earlier collaboration.

== Lyric video ==
The official lyric video for "Phone Down" was released on van Buuren's YouTube channel.

== Track listing ==
Digital download
No.	Title	Length
1.	"Phone Down"	3:12

Digital download – club mix
No.	Title	Length
1.	"Phone Down" (club mix)	3:12
2.	"Phone Down" (extended club mix)	5:46

Digital download – remixes
No.	Title	Length
1.	"Phone Down" (OFFAIAH remix)	3:00
2.	"Phone Down" (BRKLYN remix)	3:04
3.	"Phone Down" (Andrelli remix)	3:12
4.	"Phone Down" (Jorn van Deynhoven remix)	3:13
5.	"Phone Down" (OFFAIAH dub mix)	3:06
6.	"Phone Down" (OFFAIAH extended remix)	6:25
7.	"Phone Down" (BRKLYN extended remix)	3:36
8.	"Phone Down" (Andrelli extended remix)	4:24
9.	"Phone Down" (Jorn van Deynhoven extended remix)	6:12
10.	"Phone Down" (OFFAIAH extended dub mix)	6:09
11.	"Phone Down"	3:12

== Charts ==
Chart (2019)	Peak position
Belgium (Ultratip Wallonia)	26
Netherlands (Tipparade)	7

== Release history ==
Region	Date	Format	Version	Label	Ref.
Various	19 April 2019	Digital download	Original version	Armada Music	
Various	26 April 2019	Digital download	Club mix	Armind	
Various	14 June 2019	Digital download	Remixes	Armind	
