= Therapy (Armin van Buuren song) =

- Radio version

Single by Armin van Buuren featuring James Newman

from the album Balance
- Released: 20 April 2018
- Genre: Dance-pop (radio version); Progressive trance (club mix)
- Length: 3:06
- Label: Armada; Armind
- Songwriters: Benno de Goeij; Armin van Buuren; James Newman; Michael James Ryan Busbee
- Producers: Benno de Goeij; Armin van Buuren

Armin van Buuren singles chronology
"Sex, Love & Water" (2018)	"Therapy" (2018)	"Blah Blah Blah" (2018)

James Newman singles chronology
"Head Up" (2018)	"Therapy" (2018)	"Lights Go Down" (2018)

Alternative cover
- Club mix

Music video
- "Therapy" on YouTube

"Therapy" is a song recorded by Dutch DJ Armin van Buuren featuring British singer James Newman, which follows the singer's collaboration with Dutch DJ Don Diablo on the song "Head Up". It was released on 20 April 2018, through Armada Music. It was written by the two artists, Dutch producer Benno de Goeij and Michael James Ryan Busbee, and produced by de Goeij and van Buuren. A club mix and a remix pack featuring remixes from Leo Reyes, STANDERWICK, Super8 & Tab, Throttle, and Sebastian Davidson were also released on 3 May 2018 and 15 June 2018 respectively .

== Background ==
The song was premiered at Ultra Music Festival at Miami in March 2018, accompanied by its respective club mix. According to the DJ, "Therapy" is "a summer track for the festivals and the upcoming happier times". He met James Newman, the brother of John Newman who worked with Calvin Harris and Rudimental, at one of the writers camps in which he participated. That was last May," he said. "We then made two tracks together. Incidentally, "Therapy" was not among them, he sent them later. We had an unwise click and kept in touch." About the club mix, the DJ wrote on YouTube : "So cool that I can finally share this one you. Let me know what you think of the club mix!"

== Critical reception ==
Ariana O'Keefe from The Nocturnal Times noticed that the song has "a summer jam on repeat with "silky vocals, relatable lyrics and soulful chords" She also informed that the track "thrives as a reflection of the past".

== Music video ==
The official music video of the song was released at the same day through Armin van Buuren's YouTube channel. It was shot in Marrakesh, Morocco. It shows the past of Armin van Buuren, about his high-school crush, whom he had once fallen head over heels in love with. The video, inspired by a teenage love lived by the DJ, debutes with a girl who missed his train and runs in a Marrakesh station. Then, she accidentally collides with a young man. After the instant crush, he climbs on the same train and searches for different cars and stays, although without success. It was made by the agency Soulvizion, which has made other videos for Armin van Buuren, like "Sunny Days" or "Strong Ones". Ariana O'Keefe from The Nocturnal Times described it as "a romantic video" which "sets the scene for quite the dreamy paradise", complete with "golden colors, landscapes and pure elegance".

== Track listing ==
Digital download
No.	Title	Length
1.	"Therapy"	3:06
2.	"Therapy" (extended mix)	4:36

Digital download – club mix
No.	Title	Length
1.	"Therapy" (club mix)	2:48
2.	"Therapy" (extended club mix)	4:13

Digital download – remixes
No.	Title	Length
1.	"Therapy" (Leo Reyes remix)	3:11
2.	"Therapy" (Standerwick remix)	3:00
3.	"Therapy" (Super8 & Tab remix)	2:41

Digital download – Sebastian Davidson remix
No.	Title	Length
1.	"Therapy" (Sebastian Davidson remix)	3:24

Digital download – Throttle remix
No.	Title	Length
1.	"Therapy" (Throttle remix)	3:50

== Charts ==
=== Weekly charts ===
Chart (2018)	Peak position
Belgium (Ultratip Bubbling Under Wallonia)	37
Belgium Dance (Ultratop Flanders)	15
Belgium Dance (Ultratop Wallonia)	21
Netherlands (Dutch Top 40)	4
Netherlands (Single Top 100)	26
Netherlands (Dutch Dance Top 30)	6
US Dance/Mix Show Airplay (Billboard)	15

=== Year-end charts ===
Chart (2018)	Position
Netherlands (Dutch Top 40)	15
Netherlands (Single Top 100)	100

== Certifications ==
Region	Certification	Certified units/sales
Netherlands (NVPI)	Platinum	80,000^{‡}
^{‡} Sales+streaming figures based on certification alone.
