= A State of Trance Forever =

2021 compilation album by Armin van Buuren

Compilation album by Armin van Buuren
- Released: 3 September 2021
- Genre: Trance, progressive trance
- Length: 55:27
- Label: Armada Music

Armin van Buuren chronology
| The Best of Armin Only (2017) | A State of Trance Forever (2021) | Feel Again (2023) |

A State of Trance Forever is a compilation album by Dutch DJ and record producer Armin van Buuren. It was released on 3 September 2021 by Armada Music. The album was released as part of the celebration of the 1000th episode of van Buuren's radio show A State of Trance.

The album consists of collaborations between van Buuren and artists associated with the trance scene, including Maor Levi, Sander van Doorn, Rank 1, Avira, Paul Oakenfold, Aly & Fila, Push, Jorn van Deynhoven, Giuseppe Ottaviani and Susana. A State of Trance Forever peaked at number 66 in the Netherlands, number 115 in Flanders, number 64 in Germany, number 6 in Switzerland and number 100 on the UK Official Album Downloads Chart.

== Background and release ==
A State of Trance Forever was issued in connection with the A State of Trance 1000 milestone. According to the official A State of Trance website, the album was conceived as a collaboration project in which van Buuren worked with artists who had been important to the radio show's history and sound. The album opens with "Turn the World Into a Dancefloor", the official A State of Trance 1000 anthem.

== Track listing ==
Track listing adapted from Apple Music.

| No. | Title | Writer(s) | Length |
|---|---|---|---|
| 1. | "Turn the World Into a Dancefloor" (ASOT 1000 Anthem) | Armin van Buuren; Benno de Goeij | 8:54 |
| 2. | "Divino" (with Maor Levi) | van Buuren; de Goeij; Maor Levi | 5:58 |
| 3. | "Jonson's Play" (with Sander van Doorn) | van Buuren; de Goeij; Sander van Doorn | 2:57 |
| 4. | "The Greater Light to Rule the Night" (with Rank 1) | van Buuren; de Goeij | 6:42 |
| 5. | "Sirius" (with Avira) | Eric Woolfson; Alan Parsons | 6:04 |
| 6. | "Sonata" (with Paul Oakenfold) | van Buuren; de Goeij; Paul Oakenfold | 3:15 |
| 7. | "For All Time" (with Aly & Fila featuring Kazi Jay) | van Buuren; de Goeij; Nicholas Gunn; Aly & Fila | 2:55 |
| 8. | "Let Go" (with Tom Staar featuring Josha Daniel) | van Buuren; de Goeij; Tom Staar; Josha Daniel | 3:20 |
| 9. | "In the Dark You Shine" (with Push) | van Buuren; de Goeij; Mike Dierickx | 2:48 |
| 10. | "Lost in Space" (with Jorn van Deynhoven) | van Buuren; de Goeij; Jorn van Deynhoven; Dennis Schimonik | 3:23 |
| 11. | "Magico" (with Giuseppe Ottaviani) | van Buuren; de Goeij; Giuseppe Ottaviani | 6:01 |
| 12. | "Home with You" (with Susana) | van Buuren; de Goeij; Susana; Mark Otten | 3:09 |
| Total length: | | | 55:27 |

== Charts ==
Chart performance for A State of Trance Forever
| Chart (2021–2022) | Peak position |
|---|---|
| Dutch Albums (Album Top 100) | 66 |
| Belgian Albums (Ultratop Flanders) | 115 |
| German Albums (Offizielle Top 100) | 64 |
| Swiss Albums (Schweizer Hitparade) | 6 |
| UK Album Downloads (Official Charts Company) | 100 |
