= Hold On (Armin van Buuren and Davina Michelle song) =

2021 song by Armin van Buuren and Davina Michelle

Single by Armin van Buuren and Davina Michelle

from the album Higher
- Released: 10 September 2021
- Genre: Dance-pop
- Length: 3:27
- Label: Armada Music; Kontor Records
- Songwriters: Armin van Buuren; Benno de Goeij; Michelle Davina Hoogendoorn; Sebastiaan Brouwer
- Producers: Armin van Buuren; Benno de Goeij

Armin van Buuren singles chronology
"Leave a Little Love" (2021)	"Hold On" (2021)	"Come Around Again" (2022)

Davina Michelle singles chronology
"Sweet Water" (2021)	"Hold On" (2021)	"Hyper" (2021)

Music video
- "Hold On" on YouTube

"Hold On" is a song by Dutch DJ and record producer Armin van Buuren and Dutch singer Davina Michelle. It was released on 10 September 2021 by Kontor Records and Armada Music. The song marked the second collaboration between van Buuren and Michelle, after their 2019 single "Hoe het danst" with Marco Borsato. It later appeared on Michelle's 2024 studio album Higher.

Commercially, "Hold On" reached number 13 on the Dutch Top 40 and number 34 on the Dutch Single Top 100.

== Background and composition ==
"Hold On" followed van Buuren and Michelle's earlier collaboration "Hoe het danst", which became a major Dutch-language hit in 2019. The song was first presented live during the 2021 Dutch Grand Prix in Zandvoort.

Van Buuren's official website described the track as a song about perseverance and inner strength, built around an uplifting production and Michelle's vocals. Dancing Astronaut similarly described the song as being centred on strength and perseverance, noting its mixture of club and pop elements. According to the Dutch Top 40, the song was written by Sebastiaan Brouwer, Michelle Davina Hoogendoorn, Benno de Goeij and Armin van Buuren, and produced by de Goeij and van Buuren.

== Release and remixes ==
The original single was released on 10 September 2021 by Armada Music. A club mix was released on 24 September 2021 through Armind. Van Buuren's website described the club mix as a more suspenseful and atmospheric version of the song, while A State of Trance called it a future-rave-oriented rendition.

An acoustic version was released on 5 November 2021. Van Buuren's website described it as a stripped-down version centred on piano, strings and Michelle's vocals.

== Reception ==
Nancy Gomez of EDMTunes wrote that "Hold On" continued the success of van Buuren and Michelle's earlier collaboration "Hoe het danst", and noted the song's message of staying strong through difficult circumstances. Dancing Astronaut described the single as an uplifting collaboration and wrote that van Buuren's club and pop sensibilities supported Michelle's vocals.

== Music video ==
The official music video for "Hold On" was released on YouTube by Armada Music. The music video is also listed on Apple Music.

== Track listing ==
Digital download
No.	Title	Length
1.	"Hold On"	3:27

Digital download – club mix
No.	Title	Length
1.	"Hold On" (club mix)	3:09
2.	"Hold On"	3:27
3.	"Hold On" (extended club mix)	6:14

Digital download – acoustic version
No.	Title	Length
1.	"Hold On" (acoustic version)	3:26
2.	"Hold On"	3:27

== Charts ==
Chart (2021)	Peak position
Netherlands (Dutch Top 40)	13
Netherlands (Single Top 100)	34

== Certifications ==
Certifications for "Hold On"
Region	Certification	Certified units/sales
Netherlands (NVPI)	Gold	40,000^{‡}
^{*} Sales figures based on certification alone.^{^} Shipments figures based on certification alone.^{‡} Sales+streaming figures based on certification alone.

== Release history ==
Region	Date	Format	Version	Label	Ref.
Various	10 September 2021	Digital download, streaming	Original version	Armada Music, Kontor Records	
Various	24 September 2021	Digital download, streaming	Club mix	Armind	
Various	5 November 2021	Digital download, streaming	Acoustic version	Armada Music	
