= Blah Blah Blah (Armin van Buuren song) =

2018 single by Armin van Buuren

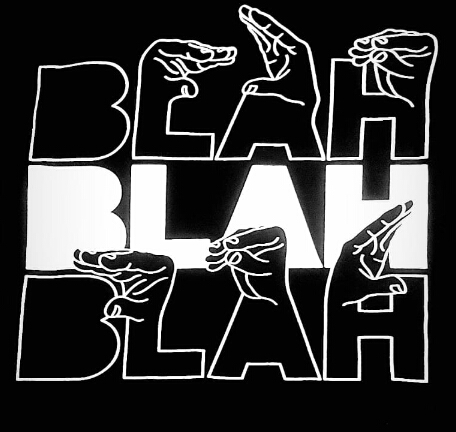

Single by Armin van Buuren

from the album Blah Blah Blah EP and Balance
- Released: 18 May 2018
- Genre: Psychedelic trance
- Length: 3:04
- Label: Armada; Blanco y Negro; Scorpio; Kontor; Warner/Chappell; Sony
- Songwriters: Armin van Buuren; Andrew Bullimore; Josh Record
- Producer: Armin van Buuren

Armin van Buuren singles chronology
"Therapy" (2018)	"Blah Blah Blah" (2018)	"The Last Dancer" (2018)

"Blah Blah Blah" is a song performed by Dutch DJ and record producer Armin van Buuren. It was released on 18 May 2018 by the label Armada Music and Armind, as the first single from the EP of the same name. As of April 2026, the video of "Blah Blah Blah" on YouTube has more than 800 million views.

The track was written by van Buuren, British singer and songwriter BullySongs (Andrew Bullimore), and Josh Record, and the vocals were performed by Bullimore's younger son Aidan.

== Track listing ==
- Digital download
1. "Blah Blah Blah" – 3:04
2. "Blah Blah Blah" (extended mix) – 6:06
3. "Blah Blah Blah" (a cappella) – 1:30
- Digital download – remixes
1. "Blah Blah Blah" (Bassjackers extended remix) – 4:18
2. "Blah Blah Blah" (Alyx Ander extended remix) – 4:44
3. "Blah Blah Blah" (Brennan Heart and Toneshifterz extended remix) – 4:44
4. "Blah Blah Blah" (Kid Comet extended remix) – 3:10
5. "Blah Blah Blah" (Zany extended remix) – 4:20
6. "Blah Blah Blah" (Tru Concept extended remix) – 3:26
- Lilly Palmer Remix
1. "Blah Blah Blah" (Lilly Palmer Extended Remix) - 6:02

== Charts ==
=== Weekly charts ===
Chart (2018–19)	Peak position
Austria (Ö3 Austria Top 40)	15
Belgium (Ultratop 50 Flanders)	19
Belgium (Ultratip Bubbling Under Wallonia)	3
Czech Republic Airplay (ČNS IFPI)	76
Czech Republic Singles Digital (ČNS IFPI)	14
Denmark (Tracklisten)	25
France (SNEP)	21
Germany (GfK)	11
Hungary (Dance Top 40)	1
Hungary (Rádiós Top 40)	2
Hungary (Single Top 40)	5
Hungary (Stream Top 40)	16
Netherlands (Dutch Top 40)	31
Netherlands (Single Top 100)	35
Poland Airplay (ZPAV)	46
Poland Dance (ZPAV)	19
Romania (Airplay 100)	68
Slovakia Singles Digital (ČNS IFPI)	10
Sweden (Sverigetopplistan)	25
Switzerland (Schweizer Hitparade)	44
US Hot Dance/Electronic Songs (Billboard)	31
US Dance Airplay (Billboard)	27

=== Year-end charts ===
Chart (2018)	Position
Austria (Ö3 Austria Top 40)	58
Belgium (Ultratop Flanders)	87
France (SNEP)	184
Germany (Official German Charts)	53
Hungary (Dance Top 40)	20
Hungary (Single Top 40)	52
Sweden (Sverigetopplistan)	91

Chart (2019)	Position
Hungary (Dance Top 40)	1
Hungary (Rádiós Top 40)	15
Hungary (Single Top 40)	21

Chart (2020)	Position
Hungary (Dance Top 40)	2

Chart (2021)	Position
Hungary (Dance Top 40)	22

== Certifications ==
Region	Certification	Certified units/sales
Belgium (BRMA)	Gold	20,000^{‡}
Canada (Music Canada)	Gold	40,000^{‡}
Denmark (IFPI Danmark)	Platinum	90,000^{‡}
France (SNEP)	Platinum	200,000^{‡}
Germany (BVMI)	3× Gold	600,000^{‡}
Italy (FIMI)	Gold	35,000^{‡}
Netherlands (NVPI)	Gold	40,000^{‡}
New Zealand (RMNZ)	Gold	15,000^{‡}
Norway (IFPI Norway)	Gold	30,000^{‡}
Spain (Promusicae)	Gold	30,000^{‡}
United Kingdom (BPI)	Silver	200,000^{‡}
United States (RIAA)	Gold	500,000^{‡}
^{‡} Sales+streaming figures based on certification alone.

== Other uses ==
Dutch association football club AFC Ajax play an excerpt of the song after every goal scored at their training ground Sportpark De Toekomst for youth leagues. The song was first played during 2019 edition of the under-17 Future Cup tournament following the successful use of the song in a marketing campaign by Ajax TV ahead of the 2018–19 UEFA Champions League quarterfinals against Juventus. Parts of the song were also used in the trailer for Netflix's 6 Underground (film) directed by Michael Bay.
