= Ajax TV =

- Country: Netherlands
- Broadcast area: Netherlands

Programming
- Language(s): Dutch
- Picture format: 576i 16:9 SDTV; 1080i HDTV

Ownership
- Owner: AFC Ajax N.V.

History
- Launched: 22 February 2003
- Former names: Canal Ajax

Links
- Website: Official website

Ajax TV is a Dutch premium television Video on demand service owned by AFC Ajax N.V. and available on channel 400 of Ziggo network systems.

On 22 February 2003 it was announced by Dutch football club AFC Ajax C.O.O. Henri van der Aat, that the club would partner with Cable television network UPC Netherlands to offer the first digital on demand channel in the Netherlands entirely dedicated to one football club. On the channel the viewer has 24-hour access to behind the scenes footage, interviews, past matches and all current matches and interviews surrounding the club from Amsterdam.
