= Lonely for You =

2019 song by Armin van Buuren featuring Bonnie McKee

- Radio version

Single by Armin van Buuren featuring Bonnie McKee

from the album Balance
- Released: 15 February 2019
- Genre: Dance-pop (radio version); Progressive trance (club mix)
- Length: 3:13
- Label: Armada; Kontor; Armind
- Songwriter(s): Benno de Goeij; Armin van Buuren; Bonnie McKee; Jessica Eden Malakouti
- Producer(s): Armin van Buuren; Benno de Goeij

Armin van Buuren singles chronology
"Repeat After Me" (2019)	"Lonely for You" (2019)	"Show Me Love" (2019)

Bonnie McKee singles chronology
"Mad Mad World" (2018)	"Lonely for You" (2019)	"Lovely" (2019)

Alternative cover
- Club mix

Music video
- "Lonely for You" on YouTube

"Lonely for You" is a song performed by Dutch DJ and record producer Armin van Buuren featuring American singer and songwriter Bonnie McKee. It was released on 15 February 2019 by the label Armada Music and Sony Music. A club mix was released on 18 February 2019.

== Track listing ==
Digital download
No.	Title	Length
1.	"Lonely for You"	3:13

Digital download – club mix
No.	Title	Length
1.	"Lonely for You" (club mix)	2:54
2.	"Lonely for You" (extended club mix)	5:41

ReOrder Remix
No.	Title	Length
1.	"Lonely for You (ReOrder Extended Remix)"	6:08

== Charts ==
Chart (2019)	Peak position
Belgium Dance (Ultratop Flanders)	30
US Dance/Mix Show Airplay (Billboard)	36
