= A State of Trance 2004 =

Compilation album by Armin van Buuren
- Released: 23 March 2004
- Recorded: 2004
- Genre: Trance, progressive trance
- Label: Armada
- Producer: Armin van Buuren

Armin van Buuren chronology
Universal Religion Chapter 1 (2003)	A State of Trance 2004 (2004)	Universal Religion Chapter 2 (2004)

Professional ratings
Review scores
Source	Rating
PopMatters	favourable link
Remix magazine	favourable link
Soulshine	favourable link
TorontoLifestyle	link

A State of Trance 2004 is a compilation album by Dutch DJ and record producer Armin van Buuren. It was released on 23 March 2004 by Armada Music. It peaked at No.21 on the Billboard Top Dance/Electronic Albums in April 2005.

The record got favorable reviews in PopMatters, Remix Magazine, Soul Shine Magazine and other media.

== Track listing ==
Disc one

1. Mark Otten – "Tranquility" – (7:10)
  Written-by, producer — Mark Otten
2. Solid Globe – "Sahara" – (5:48)
  Written-by, producer — Maurice Night, Nic Vegter, Rene Van Dijk, Yves Le Verne
3. Whirlpool – "Under the Sun" (Solarstone Remix) – (7:18)
  Producer — Filo & Peri
  Remix — Solarstone
  Written-by — Bo Pericic, Domenick Filopei
4. Three Drives – "Signs from the Universe" – (4:14)
  Written-by, producer — DJ Ton T.B., Erik De Koning
5. Airwave – "Ladyblue" (Original beat) – (5:53)
  Written-by, producer — Laurent Véronnez
6. Kyau vs. Albert – "Velvet Morning" (Aalto Remix) – (5:01)
  Remix — Aalto
  Written-by, producer — Ralph Kyau, Steven Moebius Albert
7. Fictivision vs. Phynn – "Escape" (Phynn Mix) – (5:36)
  Remix — Phynn
  Written-by, producer — Bart Van Wissen, Finne De Jager
8. Perpetuous Dreamer – "Future Funland" (Astura Remix) – (5:00)
  Remix — Astura
  Written-by, composed by, producer — Armin van Buuren
9. Active Sight – "The Search for Freedom" – (6:01)
  Written-by, producer — Fred Baker, M.I.K.E.
10. Super8 – Alba – (6:00)
  Written-by, producer — Miika Eloranta
11. *OceanLab – "Satellite" (Original Above & Beyond Remix) – (5:45)
  Remix, producer — Above & Beyond
  Written-by — Jono Grant, Justine Suissa, Paavo Siljamäki, Tony McGuinness
12. Robert Nickson – "Spiral" – (6:54)
  Written-by, producer — Robert Nickson
13. Armin van Buuren featuring Justine Suissa – "Burned With Desire" (Rising Star Mix) – (7:07)
  Remix — "Rising Star"
  Written-by, producer — Armin van Buuren, Justine Suissa

Disc two

1. Perry O'Neil – "Kubik" – (8:06)
  Written-by, producer — Perry O'Neil
2. Valentino – "Flying" (Sultan and The Greek Remix) – (5:37) Mixed by — Iztok Turk, Valentino Kanzyani
  Producer, arranged by — Valentino Kanzyani
  Remix — Sultan and The Greek
  Written-by — Denis Beganovich, Valentino Kanzyani
3. Michael Burns – "The Ambience" – (4:35)
  Written-by, producer — Michael Burns
4. Peter Martin presents Anthanasia – "Perfect Wave" – (6:43)
  Written-by, producer — Peter Martin
5. St. John vs. Locust – "Mind Circles" (Perry O'Neil Remix) – (4:47)
  Written-by, producer — John Sims, Perry O'Neil
6. Remy and Roland Klinkenberg – "Fearless" – (5:42)
  Written-by, producer — Remy Unger, Roland Klinkenberg
7. Solarstone vs. Scott Bond – "Naked Angel" – (6:07)
  Written-by, producer — Andy Bury, Rich Mowatt, Scott Bond
8. M.I.K.E. presents Fascinated – "Totally Fascinated" – (6:18)
  Written-by, producer — M.I.K.E.
9. Mono – "Rise" – (5:37)
  Written-by, producer — Jezper Söderlund
10. *Envio – "Time To Say Goodbye" (Passiva Mix) – (6:04)
  Remix — Passiva
  Written-by, producer — Ashkan Fardost
11. True Form – "Forbidden Colours" – (7:28)
  Written-by, producer — Perry O'Neil, Robert Nickson
12. Arctic Quest – "Offbeat" – (5:31)
  Written-by, producer — Emiel Ten Hoor
13. *Terry Bones vs. Fred Baker presents Water Planet – "Introspection" (John Askew Mix) – (5:06)
  Producer — Fred Baker, Mr. Sam
  Remix – John Askew
  Written-by, composed by, arranged by — Frédéric De Backer, Terry Bones

== Charts ==
Chart (2004)	Peak position
Dutch Albums (Album Top 100)	9
US Top Dance Albums (Billboard)	21
