= Universal Religion Chapter 2 =

Compilation album by Armin van Buuren
- Released: 5 April 2004
- Genres: Trance; progressive trance; progressive house
- Label: Armada

Armin van Buuren chronology
A State of Trance 2004 (2004)	Universal Religion Chapter 2 (2004)	A State of Trance 2005 (2005)

Singles from Universal Religion 2004
- 1. "Intruder" / "Pound" Released: 8 September 2004

Universal Religion Chapter 2, also known as Universal Religion 2004: Live From Armada At Ibiza, is the second compilation album in the Universal Religion compilation series mixed and compiled by Dutch DJ and record producer Armin van Buuren. It was released on 5 April 2004 by Armada Music.

The digital download version was released on 5 April 2004 on iTunes and contains edits of the individual songs listed, as well as the full continuous mix.

== Track listing ==
No.	Title	Artist	Length
1.	"Hello Strings (Edit)"	Synergy	4:24
2.	"The World Doesn't Know"	Tilt	9:58
3.	"Why?"	LoLo	8:42
4.	"Find (Andy Moor Mix)"	Ridgewalkers featuring EI	4:56
5.	"External Key (Edit)"	Audioholics	5:17
6.	"Wave Force (Radio Edit)"	Perry O'Neil	3:32
7.	"Talk Like a Stranger (featuring Jes) [ Markus Schulz Mix]"	Deepsky	9:23
8.	"Foreplay"	Probspot	9:59
9.	"Surrender (Edit)"	Above & Beyond Presents Tranquility Base	4:13
10.	"Voller Sterne (Super8 Remix)"	Mirco de Govia	7:46
11.	"CQ (Seek You)"	EnMass	9:03
12.	"Out of Our Lives"	Active Sight	8:21
13.	"The Timelord (Edit)"	Signum	5:09
14.	"Intruder (Edit)"	Armin vs. M.I.K.E.	4:15
Total length:			1:17:09
