= Status Excessu D (The Official A State of Trance 500 Anthem) =

2011 single by Armin van Buuren presents Gaia

Single by Armin van Buuren presents Gaia
- Released: 4 April 2011
- Genre: Uplifting trance
- Length: 2:59 (radio edit); 9:42 (original mix)
- Label: Armind; Armada
- Songwriters: Armin van Buuren; Benno de Goeij
- Producer: Gaia

"Status Excessu D" is an instrumental composition by Dutch DJ and record producer Armin van Buuren, released under his Gaia project. It was released as "Status Excessu D (The Official A State of Trance 500 Anthem)" in 2011 by Armada Music and Armind.

The track served as the official anthem for the 500th episode celebrations of van Buuren's radio show A State of Trance. It reached number 158 on the Russia Airplay chart compiled by TopHit.

== Background and release ==
In 2011, A State of Trance reached its 500th episode, which was celebrated with five events across five continents over five weeks. Van Buuren produced "Status Excessu D" as Gaia, following earlier Gaia releases such as "4 Elements", "Tuvan" and "Aisha". The single was released digitally with the original mix and radio edit.

== Music video ==
An official music video was released for "Status Excessu D". The A State of Trance website described it as the official music video for the theme song of the A State of Trance 500 celebrations.

== Track listing ==
Track listing adapted from Discogs and Apple Music.

Digital single
No.	Title	Length
1.	"Status Excessu D" (The Official A State of Trance 500 Anthem) (Radio Edit)	2:59
2.	"Status Excessu D" (The Official A State of Trance 500 Anthem) (Original Mix)	9:42

== Charts ==
Chart (2011)	Peak position
Russia Airplay (TopHit)	158

== Release history ==
Year	Title	Region	Format	Label	Ref.
2011	"Status Excessu D (The Official A State of Trance 500 Anthem)"	Worldwide	Digital download	Armind; Armada Music	
