= Wild Wild Son =

2018 song by Armin van Buuren featuring Sam Martin

- Radio version

Single by Armin van Buuren featuring Sam Martin

from the album Balance
- Released: 12 October 2018
- Genre: Future bass; dance-pop (radio version); Progressive trance (club mix)
- Length: 3:33
- Label: Armada; Armind
- Songwriter(s): Benno de Goeij; Armin van Buuren; Sam Martin
- Producer(s): Benno de Goeij; Armin van Buuren

Armin van Buuren singles chronology
"United" (2018)	"Wild Wild Son" (2018)	"Lifting You Higher (ASOT 900 Anthem)" (2018)

Sam Martin singles chronology
"Breathe" (2018)	"Wild Wild Son" (2018)	"Say It for You" (2018)

Alternative cover
- Club mix

Music video
- "Wild Wild Son" on YouTube

"Wild Wild Son" is a song recorded by Dutch DJ and record producer Armin van Buuren featuring American singer Sam Martin. It was released on 12 October 2018, through Armada Music. It was produced by the DJ himself and his frequent Dutch record producer Benno de Goeij and composed by Benno de Goeij and the two artists. Armin van Buuren also released a club mix on 19 October 2018 and a remixes pack on 18 January 2019.

== Background ==
Armin van Buuren premiered his song at his seven-hour set at the Untold Festival in Romania in August 2018. He also explained that it was composed for his 5-year-old son Remy. He later told about the song :

Many people ask me which songs I am most proud of. All the songs are my babies, but some tracks with which I have more connection is simply because of the time I spent or because of the emotion it entails. In this case, 'Wild Wild Son' is about the son of Sam Martin (then not born). I fell in love with the song so much because I recognize the love I feel for my own son. I also made an extra effort with the production, recording drums (Koen) and real strings. It was almost a year in the realization of this song. It's a little different from my previous job and a big step for me personally.

— Armin van Buuren, talking about the release,

The single was announced on Armin van Buuren's Instagram. It's about the bond between the DJ and his growing son and the lyrics about raising the small and the inevitable passage of time. On 20 November, Armin van Buuren shared a photo of himself and his son on his shoulders in the setting sun. He debuted a #WildWildSon movement, which consisted of sharing photos of moments between parents and their children.

== Critical reception ==
=== Original version ===
Franz from DJ Mag Germany called the song "a beautiful, calm future bass and pop ballad", which differs from the usual trance songs of the DJ. Nils from DJ Mag Germany described it as an "empathetic mix of pop and future house". Writing for Dancing Astronaut, Farrell Sweeney described the song as "an emotive track" which is different from previous Armin's trance songs, and which "could find a home during a melancholy movie scene thanks to Sam Martin's heartfelt vocals". Karlie Powell from Your EDM described it as a "heart-tugging ballad" which is different from the usual style of the DJ.

=== Club mix ===
Writing for Dancing Astronaut, Rachel Narozniak noticed that "the piano-driven original resembles a ballad in its slow-paced intro that gradually mounts, but ever attuned to the trappings of a dance floor filler, Armin van Buuren swaps out the elegant piano opener for an accelerated BPM and hits of low-seated synth work". She said that the DJ amplified the version's effervescence as the track progresses and this effect is accompanied by metallic synths which provide a tonal contrast as the club mix builds.

== Music video ==
The official music video of the song was released at the same day through Armin van Buuren's YouTube channel. It was viewed over two millions times two weeks after the release. Dianne van Vugt from Zutphen, a fan of Armin van Buuren, accidentally drove past the recordings two weeks ago. She said : "We saw cameras and someone was filmed on the piano. We haven't stopped. That's the biggest mistake ever because it turned out to be Armin who recorded the clip for his new single." Van Vugt requested the single on the morning of 14 October "as a consolation" on Radio Gelderland. The video shows a family having fun in a nature reserve in Leesterheide forest between Het Leesten and Den Ham, in Ugchelen, Netherlands. Armin van Buuren wasn't present during the video was shot. He has thanked the ranch on YouTube in its comments. The ranch responded : "We are proud that our location has been used in the new video." Furthermore, Ilse DeLange came too in the ranch with candidats of The Voice of Holland, and Paul de Leeuw and Thomas Berge too recorded their clips in Het Leesten.

== Track listing ==
Digital download
No.	Title	Length
1.	"Wild Wild Son"	3:33

Digital download – club mix
No.	Title	Length
1.	"Wild Wild Son" (club mix)	3:38
2.	"Wild Wild Son" (extended club mix)	7:00

Digital download – remixes
No.	Title	Length
1.	"Wild Wild Son" (Richard Durand remix)	3:51
2.	"Wild Wild Son" (Fatum remix)	3:27
3.	"Wild Wild Son" (Richard Durand extended remix)	6:48
4.	"Wild Wild Son" (Fatum extended remix)	5:35

Digital download – Devin Wild remix
No.	Title	Length
1.	"Wild Wild Son" (Devin Wild remix)	3:43
2.	"Wild Wild Son" (Devin Wild extended remix)	5:52

== Charts ==
=== Weekly charts ===
Chart (2018–19)	Peak position
Belgium (Ultratip Bubbling Under Flanders)	27
Netherlands (Dutch Top 40)	12
Netherlands (Single Top 100)	41
Netherlands (Dutch Dance Top 30)	8
Romania (Airplay 100)	42

=== Year-end charts ===
Chart (2018)	Position
Netherlands (Dutch Top 40)	86

== Certifications ==
Region	Certification	Certified units/sales
Netherlands (NVPI)	Gold	40,000^{‡}
^{‡} Sales+streaming figures based on certification alone.
