= Josh Cumbee =

American singer-songwriter

- Born: Joshua Kissiah Cumbee; Anaheim, California, United States
- Origin: Irvine, California, United States
- Genres: Pop music; rock music; electronic music
- Occupations: Singer; songwriter; music producer
- Instruments: Piano; guitar; bass; French horn; xylophone; trumpet; drums
- Years active: 2009–present
- Label: AVEX Group
- Website: https://joshcumbee.com

Joshua Kissiah Cumbee is an American musician, multi-instrumentalist, singer, songwriter and record producer. He is best known for his artist collaborations with Armin van Buuren and as a songwriter for other artists.

== Early life ==
After high school, in 2008, he enrolled in the music business program at University of Southern California in Los Angeles. He graduated in 2011.

== Early career ==
Already being a student, Cumbee released songs on iTunes as an independent artist ("Find The Light", "I Do My Own Stunts", "The End", "How To Say This"). He was working on television as a composer, writing music for commercials, television shows ("The Bachelor", "Ready for Love", "America's Next Top Model", "Polyamory", "Southern Nights") and short movies.

Cumbee's first official appearance in credits for the song happened in 2012. He did strings programming on Kerli's song "Immortal" which was part of the soundtrack album "Frankenweenie Unleashed!".

Later, Cumbee was hired for the studio of Grammy winning songwriter Toby Gad where he was writing, producing, playing instruments, programming and engineering music for other artists. He worked for Janet Jackson, Take That, Madonna, Chris Brown, Adam Lambert, Heffron Drive, Kygo, Sean Paul, Galantis, Sabrina Carpenter, Lindsey Stirling, Anastacia, Sia and many others.

In 2015, Cumbee co-wrote 3 songs for Natalia Jiménez album "Creo En Mí" ("Creo En Mí", "Algo Brill En Mi " and "Tú No Me Quieres Más"). The album was nominated for Album of the Year at the 2015 Latin Grammy Awards but lost out to Juan Luis Guerra 4.40. Also in 2015, Sean Paul's album "Full Frequency" received a Grammy nomination as Reggae album of the year, Josh was engineer on the track "Pornstar" from the album.

== Breakthrough ==
=== Work with Armin van Buuren ===
The single "Sunny Days" by Armin van Buuren featuring Cumbee was released on June 16, 2017 on Armada Music. It was written by Armin van Buuren, Benno de Goeij, Afshin Salmani, Josh Cumbee, Toby Gad and Gordon Groothedde. The music video was shot in Bevagna and Assisi, Italy. The single received double platinum status in the Netherlands. A special Christmas version of the song called "Christmas Days" was released on December 9, 2017.

On March 29, 2019 another collaboration with van Buuren "Don't Give Up On Me" was released. The song was made with Lucas & Steve.

Cumbee and van Buuren performed live in Los Angeles, Las Vegas, Vancouver and at Untold Festival in Romania.

=== 2019 - 2020 ===
In April 2019, Cumbee signed a contract with AVEX Group as recording artist.

The single "Lifetime" by Zonderling featuring Cumbee and Damon Sharpe was released on August 23, 2019 on Armada.

Collaboration with Fedde Le Grand "Dancing Shoes" was out on January 24, 2020, on Interstellar Label.

On February 14, 2020, Cumbee released his first solo single "Sound Of Your Name", with the music video filmed at Mount Myoko in Niigata, Japan by director Yudai Maruyama. The second single "Brave Enough" was released on March 13, 2020. The third single "Worth Missing" released on July 3, 2020. Its music video was filmed in Tokyo.

== Discography ==
=== Singles ===
==== As solo artist ====
- Sound Of Your Name (2020)
- Brave Enough (2020)
- Worth Missing (2020)

==== As featured artist ====
- Armin van Buuren feat. Josh Cumbee - Sunny Days (2017)
- Armin van Buuren feat. Josh Cumbee - Sunny Days (Club Mix) (2017)
- Armin van Buuren feat. Josh Cumbee - Christmas Days (2017)
- Armin van Buuren x Lucas & Steve feat. Josh Cumbee - Don't Give Up On Me (2019)
- Armin van Buuren x Lucas & Steve feat. Josh Cumbee - Don't Give Up On Me (Club Mix/Trance Mix) (2019)
- Zonderling feat. Josh Cumbee - Lifetime (2019)
- Zonderling feat. Josh Cumbee - Lifetime (VIP & Acoustic) (2019)
- Fedde Le Grand & Josh Cumbee - Dancing Shoes (2020)

==== As vocalist ====
- AFSHeeN - Let Me Down Slow (2016)
- AFSHeeN - Tunnel (2016)
- Florian Picasso - Final Call (2016)
- Lazy Rich - Knock Me Out (2016)
- Florian Picasso - Guns Down (2017)
- Florian Picasso & GRX - Restart Your Heart (2020)
- Timmy Trumpet & Florian Picasso - Armageddon (2020)

=== Songwriting credits ===
2012

- Kerli - "Immortal"

2013

- Sean Paul feat. Nyla - "Pornstar"
- Prince Royce & Selena Gomez - "Already Missing You"
- Christina Grimmie - "Absolutely Final Goodbye"
- Christina Grimmie - "The One I Crave"

2014

- Hilary Duff - "Chasing The Sun"
- Anastacia - Broken Wings
- Sofia Reyes feat. Wisin - "Muevelo"
- Kendall Schmidt - "Blame It On The Middletoe"
- Heffron Drive - "Division of the Heart"
- Heffron Drive - "Passing Time"
- Heffron Drive - "Everything Has Changed"
- Alex & Sierra - "Little Do You Know"
- Nick Howard - "Dancing As One"
- Nick Howard - "Can't Break a Broken Heart"
- Nick Howard - "Million Dollars"

2015

- Lena - "Lifeline"
- Project 46 feat. Olivia - "Forgettable"
- Chris Brown - "No Filter"
- Take That - "Will You Be There For Me"
- Madonna - "Joan of Arc"
- Madonna - "Graffiti Heart"
- Madonna feat. Chance The Rapper & Mike Tyson - "Iconic"
- TVXQ! - "Rise As One"
- Sia - "Alive" (AFSHeeN Remix)
- Fergie - "L.A.LOVE (la la)" (AFSHeeN Remix)
- Janet Jackson feat. J.Cole - "No Sleep" (AFSHeeN Remix)
- Natalia Jiménez - "Creo En Mí"
- Natalia Jiménez - "Tú No Me Quieres Más"
- Natalia Jiménez - "Algo Brilla En Mí"
- Lazy Rich feat. Trinidad Jame - "Hit That"

2016

- Lindsey Stirling - "The Phoenix"
- AFSHeeN - "Let Me Down Slow"
- AFSHeeN - "Tunnel"
- AFSHeeN - "Secrets"
- Florian Picasso - "Final Call"
- Florian Picasso feat. VASSY - "Cracked Wall"
- Sabrina Carpenter - "All We Have Is Love"
- Brooke Candy - "Paper Or Plastic"
- Blasterjaxx & DBSTF feat. GO COMET! - "Hit Me"
- Lazy Rich & Hot Mouth feat. GO COMET! - "Won't Stop"
- Lazy Rich - "Give Me Crazy"
- Lazy Rich - "Knock Me Out"

2017

- Florian Picasso - "This Is Our Time"
- AFSHeeN - "Amélie"
- AFSHeeN feat. NISHA - "Pull Me From The Waves"
- Armin van Buuren feat. Josh Cumbee - "Sunny Days"
- Florian Picasso - "Guns Down"
- Lindsey Stirling - "Dance Of The Sugar Plum Fairy"
- Galantis feat. ROZES - "Girls On Boys"
- Mat Kearney & AFSHeeN - "Better Than I Used To Be"
- AFSHeeN feat. Rebecca Ferguson - "Uncrazy"
- JP Cooper - "Masterpiece"
- NCT 127 - "Sun & Moon"
- Roy Wang - "Sleep"
- Quinn XCII - "One Day At A Time"
- Chris Lee (Yu Chun Li) - "Happy Ever After"
- Armin van Buuren feat. Josh Cumbee - "Christmas Days"

2018

- AFSHeeN feat. Rebecca Ferguson - "Creatures Of The Night"
- Mat Kearney - "I Can't Wait for You to Get There"
- Mat Kearney - "Keep On Loving You"
- Joel Taylor - "Give Myself Away"
- Ebi - "Nafas Nafas"
- Benedict Cork - "Wildfire"
- BoA - "Nega Dola"
- NCT 2018 - "Black On Black"
- YURI x Raiden - "Always Find You"
- RYEOWOOK - "One and Only"
- KUN - "Wait Wait Wait"

2019

- Armin van Buuren x Lucas & Steve feat. Josh Cumbee - "Don't Give Up On Me"
- Florian Picasso feat. Echosmith - "But Us"
- Kerli - "Legends"
- Flawes - "Don't Count Me Out"
- Adam Lambert - "Feel Something"
- KUN - "Bigger"
- KUN - "没有意外" (No Exception)
- TAEYEON - "Four Seasons"
- Brennan Heart - "Outcasts"
- Kygo and Rita Ora - "Carry On"
- Kinsey - "Hot Mess"
- Kinsey - "Don't Be a Dick, Ted"
- Merk & Kremont - "KIDS"
- Zonderling feat. Josh Cumbee - "Lifetime"
- Quintino x AFSHeeN feat. Cher Lloyd - "Don't Lose Love"
- Marina Kaye - "Twisted"
- Karry Wang - "Ain't Got No Love"
- Audrey - "30 Years"
- Audrey - "Crazy"
- Klingande - "Only Breath"
- Olivia Rodrigo & Julia Lester - "Wondering" - From High School Musical: The Musical: The Series
- Olivia Rodrigo - "Out of the Old" - From High School Musical: The Musical: The Series

2020

- Josh Cumbee, Jordan Powers - "Wondering" - Instrumental
- Josh Cumbee, Jordan Powers - "Out of the Old" - Instrumental
- Fedde Le Grand & Josh Cumbee - "Dancing Shoes"
- Flawes - "Take This Slow"
- Milo Manheim & Meg Donnelly - "Gotta Find Where I Belong"
- Josh Cumbee - "Sound Of Your Name"
- Ghali - "Good Times"
- Josh Cumbee - "Brave Enough"
- ENDURE & Souzda Ammo - "Esa Min"
- Florian Picasso ft. Gashi & Ally Brooke - "Like You Do"
- Florian Picasso & GRX - "Restart Your Heart"
- DIAMANTE - "Serves You Right"
- NCT DREAM - "Puzzle Piece"
- NU'EST - "Moon Dance"
- Timmy Trumpet & Florian Picasso - "Armageddon"
- Caroline Kole - "Still Frames"
- Josh Cumbee - "Worth Missing"
- Roy Wang - "Stop the Clocks"

2022

- Girls' Generation - "Villain"

2023

- Monsta X - "Beautiful Liar"
- Got the Beat - "Alter Ego"

==== Music for films ====
- Check Engine (2010)
- Chance (2010)
- Launch (2011)
- Big Feet (2011)
- Two Tickets to Paradise (2011)
- Operation Terror (2012)
- Spark (2014)
