= Turn It Up (Armin van Buuren song) =

Song by Armin van Buuren

Single by Armin van Buuren

from the album Balance
- Released: 15 March 2019
- Genre: Psychedelic trance
- Length: 2:52
- Label: Armind; Armada
- Songwriters: Armin van Buuren; Duck Blackwell; Ki Fitzgerald
- Producer: Armin van Buuren

Armin van Buuren singles chronology
"Show Me Love" (2019)	"Turn It Up" (2019)	"Don't Give Up on Me" (2019)

"Turn It Up" is a song performed by Dutch DJ and record producer Armin van Buuren. It was released on 15 March 2019 by the label Armind on Armada Music, as the ninth single from the album Balance. The song sounds similar to an earlier Armin van Buuren song, "Blah Blah Blah" (2018).

== Background ==
Armin van Buuren declared about the song: "I'm always excited for the festival season because of the crowd's response to tracks like these. Nothing beats the feeling you get when fans go absolutely nuts to something you play, and 'Turn It Up' was made for that exact purpose. I'm really looking forward to playing this one all throughout the summer."

== Track listings ==
- Digital download
1. "Turn It Up" – 2:52
- Digital download – extended
1. "Turn It Up" (extended mix) – 6:45
2. "Turn It Up" (a cappella) – 1:32
- Digital download – remixes
1. "Turn It Up" (Dropgun extended remix) – 3:43
2. "Turn It Up" (Sound Rush extended remix) – 4:25
3. "Turn It Up" (Clément Leroux extended remix) – 6:19
4. "Turn It Up" (Gian Verala extended remix) – 3:42

== Charts ==
=== Weekly charts ===
Chart (2019)	Peak position
Belgium (Ultratip Bubbling Under Flanders)	4
Belgium (Ultratip Bubbling Under Wallonia)	28
France (SNEP)	148
Hungary (Dance Top 40)	4

=== Year-end charts ===
Chart (2019)	Position
Hungary (Dance Top 40)	24
Chart (2020)	Position
Hungary (Dance Top 40)	46
