= Universal Religion Chapter 1 =

Compilation album by Armin van Buuren
- Released: 3 November 2003
- Genres: Trance; progressive trance; progressive house
- Label: Armada

Armin van Buuren chronology
76 (2003)	Universal Religion Chapter 1 (2003)	A State of Trance 2004 (2004)

Universal Religion Chapter 1 is the first compilation album in the Universal Religion compilation series mixed and compiled by Dutch DJ and record producer Armin van Buuren. It was released on 3 November 2003 by Armada Music.

The digital download version was released on 3 November 2003 on iTunes and contains edits of the individual songs listed, as well as the full continuous mix.

== Track listing ==
No.	Title	Artist	Length
1.	"Mushroom Therapy (Lightscape Mix)"	Mark Otten	6:56
2.	"Extended Horizon"	LoLo	4:43
3.	"Vagabond"	Scarab	5:10
4.	"Amazon"	Midway	5:37
5.	"As the Rush Comes (Armin van Buuren's Universal Religion Mix)"	Motorcycle	7:26
6.	"One More Day"	Mr Sam, Tim Coltrane and The Tribute	5:34
7.	"Touched By the Sun (Radio Edit)"	Envio	5:19
8.	"Heal [12" Instrumental Mix]"	Electrique Boutique featuring Taz	6:28
9.	"Elevation"	Filo & Peri	5:35
10.	"Turn Out the Lights"	M.I.K.E.	7:09
11.	"Song for the Ocean (Instrumental)"	Armin van Buuren	6:54
12.	"Soul Deep (Signum Dub Mix)"	Laura Turner	6:33
Total length:			1:13:31
