= Pick Up the Phone =

Pick Up the Phone may refer to:

- "Pick Up the Phone" (Dragonette song), 2009
- "Pick Up the Phone" (The Notwist song), 2002
- "Pick Up the Phone" (Young Thug and Travis Scott song), 2016
- "Pick Up the Phone", a song by Brakes from Give Blood, 2005
- "Pick Up the Phone", a song by F. R. David from Words, 1982
- "Pick Up the Phone", a song by Falling in Reverse from The Drug in Me Is You, 2011
- "Pick Up the Phone", a song by Lupe Fiasco from Drogas Light, 2017
