= A State of Trance 2005 =

Compilation album by Armin van Buuren
- Released: 12 March 2005
- Recorded: 2005
- Genre: Trance; progressive trance
- Label: Armada; Ultra
- Producer: Armin van Buuren

Armin van Buuren chronology
| Universal Religion Chapter 2 (2004) | A State of Trance 2005 (2005) | Shivers (2005) |

A State of Trance 2005 is the second compilation album by Dutch DJ and record producer Armin van Buuren. It was released on 12 March 2005 by Armada Music and Ultra Music.

== Track listing ==
Disc one – Light

1. Interstate – "I Found You"
2. Hidden Logic presents Luminary – "Wasting"
3. Markus Schulz featuring Anita Kelsey – "First Time"
4. Max Graham featuring Jessica Jacobs – "I Know You're Gone"
5. Mike Foyle presents Statica – "Space Guitar"
6. Ava Mea – "In the End"
7. Elevation – "Ocean Rain"
8. Locust – "Aerospace [Probspot Remix]"
9. Armin van Buuren – "Shivers"
10. EnMass – "Beyond Horizon"
11. Kyau vs. Albert – "Falling Anywhere [Rework]"
12. Fragile featuring Alex Lemon – "Inertia [Armin van Buuren Remix]"
13. Sophie Sugar – "Call of Tomorrow [John O'Callaghan Remix]"
14. Marcos – "Cosmic String" **
15. John Askew – "Mood Swing" **

Disc two – Dark

1. Peter Martin presents Anthanasia – "Simply Blue"
2. Nufrequency – "808 (Why Oh Why) [Instrumental Mix]"
3. Andy Moor – "Halcyon"
4. Ahmet Ertenu – "Why [Derek Howell Mix]"
5. O. Lieb vs. DJ Preach – "Papel [Preach Remix]"
6. Remy – "Crackdown"
7. Gabriel & Dresden – "Arcadia"
8. Tilt – "Twelve [Max Graham Remix]"
9. Matthew Dekay – "Deep Show"
10. Recluse – "Emotional Void"
11. Adam White featuring Martin Grech – "Ballerina"
12. Blank & Jones – "Perfect Silence [E-Craig 212 Vocal Mix]"
13. Kyau vs. Albert – "Made of Sun [KvA Hard Dub – AVB Edit]"
14. M.I.K.E. – "Massive Motion" **
15. Eye Wall – "Bad Deal" **
16. Hammer & Bennett – "Language [Santiago Nino Dub Tech Mix]" **
17. Liquid Overdose – "Ancient Space [Fred Baker Remix]" **

** Tracks not available on the US release.

== Charts ==
| Chart (2005) | Peak position |
|---|---|
| Dutch Albums (Album Top 100) | 6 |
| US Top Dance/Electronic Albums (Billboard) | 15 |

== Release history ==
| Region | Date |
|---|---|
| Netherlands | 12 March 2005 |
| United States | 5 April 2005 |
