= Larger than Life (Armin van Buuren and Chef'Special song) =

2024 song by Armin van Buuren

Single by Armin van Buuren and Chef'Special

from the album Breathe Out
- Released: 30 May 2024
- Genre: Progressive house
- Length: 2:55 (radio version); 4:36 (extended mix)
- Label: Armada Music
- Songwriters: Armin van Buuren; Guido Joseph; Wouter Heeren; Jan Derks; Wouter Prudon; Joshua Nolet
- Producers: Armin van Buuren; Chef'Special; Bob Sandee; Jasper Zuidervaart; Merijn Berge

Armin van Buuren singles chronology
| "Destination (ASOT 2024 Anthem)" (2023) | "Larger than Life" (2024) | "In the Dark" (2024) |

Chef'Special singles chronology
| "Fly Like Me" (2024) | "Larger than Life" (2024) | "C'est la Vie" (2025) |

"Larger than Life" is a song recorded by Dutch DJ Armin van Buuren and Dutch indie pop band Chef'Special. It was the anthem for the UEFA EURO 2024 campaign of the Netherlands national football team.

== Background and release ==
Recording for the song began in January 2024. During the initial sessions, Armin van Buuren and Chef'Special weren't satisfied, so a new version was created, which ultimately became the final single. The song was partially recorded during a Chef'Special's camp held concurrently with the Dutch national team's training camp in Zeist. As a result, the players, led by captain Virgil van Dijk, can be heard clapping and providing backing vocals on the track.

Chef'Special declared about the song:

We wrote ‘Larger Than Life’ from the desire to spark a fire. It’s about the journey that hopefully leads to greatness, meaning something that’s bigger than ourselves. That process and that type of belief in one another can lift you up and make you feel larger than life. When we combine our strengths and connect as human beings, there’s nothing we’re incapable of.

— Chef'Special, talking about the release,

I thoroughly enjoyed working with Chef’Special and the Dutch men’s national football team for ‘Larger than Life. Our track embodies the faith required to make dreams come true and I hope its euphoric and positive tone will inspire everyone listening to the track. Let’s achieve greatness!

— Armin van Buuren, talking about the release,

‘Larger than Life’ is also the first record since 1988 to feature the musical contributions of the players of the Dutch men's national football team. Ronald Koeman, the head coach of the Netherlands’ men's team, adds:

Back in 1988, I was an international player myself and among the many who featured on André Hazes’ classic song. Not only was it fun to do, but it also instilled a strong sense of togetherness. I heard from the players that they too enjoyed contributing to the song. I feel it’s a great track and I hope it helps to get the entire country behind the team this summer. With the support of our fans and the entire country, I believe in a successful European Championship.

— Ronald Koeman, talking about ‘Larger than Life’,

== Music video ==
A music video to accompany the release of "Larger than Life" was first released onto YouTube on 15 June 2024 at a total length of two minutes and fifty-eight seconds.

== Track listing ==
Digital download
| No. | Title | Length |
|---|---|---|
| 1. | "Larger than Life" | 2:55 |
| 2. | "Larger than Life" (extended mix) | 4:36 |

== Charts ==
| Chart (2024) | Peak position |
|---|---|
| Netherlands (Dutch Top 40) | 19 |
| Netherlands (Single Top 100) | 36 |

== Certifications ==
| Region | Certification | Certified units/sales |
|---|---|---|
| Netherlands (NVPI) | Gold | 46,500^{‡} |
^{‡} Sales+streaming figures based on certification alone.
