= Leave a Little Love =

2021 song by Alesso and Armin van Buuren

Single by Alesso and Armin van Buuren
- Released: 25 February 2021
- Genre: Slap house (original); progressive trance (club mix)
- Length: 3:07
- Label: Kontor; Universal; Armind (club mix)
- Songwriters: Armin van Buuren; Benno de Goeij; Alessandro Lindblad; Laura Welsh; Max Wolfgang; Tom Martin
- Producers: Alesso; van Buuren; de Goeij

Alesso singles chronology
"The End" (2020)	"Leave a Little Love" (2021)	"Going Dumb" (2021)

Armin van Buuren singles chronology
"Turn the World into a Dancefloor" (2021)	"Leave a Little Love" (2021)	"Magico" (2021)

Music video
- "Leave a Little Love" on YouTube

"Leave a Little Love" is a song by Swedish DJ and record producer Alesso and Dutch DJ Armin van Buuren. It was released on 25 February 2021 via Kontor Records and Universal. It also marks the first collaboration for them on an original song.

== Critical reception ==
Ellie Mullins of We Rave You commented the track: "the powerful and anthemic vocals drive the track in the right direction, acting as the cherry on top of the delicious-sounding cake."

== Music video ==
The music video was released on 7 March 2021. According to a description by Rachel Narozniak of Dancing Astronaut, the video features with an animated and visual of "Mario Kart-esque", artists are stylized as race cars, and recorded they "rush to the finish line in nearly four minutes' time."

== Other versions ==
In March 2021, van Buuren released the "Club Mix" version of the track. It has element of progressive trance.

== Charts ==
=== Weekly charts ===
Weekly chart performance for "Leave a Little Love"
Chart (2021–2024)	Peak position
Belgium (Ultratip Bubbling Under Flanders)	26
Hungary (Dance Top 40)	9
Hungary (Rádiós Top 40)	10
Netherlands (Dutch Top 40)	23
Netherlands (Single Top 100)	62
US Hot Dance/Electronic Songs (Billboard)	19
US Dance/Mix Show Airplay (Billboard)	5

=== Year-end charts ===
2021 year-end chart performance for "Leave a Little Love"
Chart (2021)	Position
Hungary (Dance Top 40)	88
Hungary (Rádiós Top 40)	61
US Hot Dance/Electronic Songs (Billboard)	67

2022 year-end chart performance for "Leave a Little Love"
Chart (2022)	Position
Hungary (Dance Top 40)	67

2023 year-end chart performance for "Leave a Little Love"
Chart (2023)	Position
Hungary (Dance Top 40)	64

2024 year-end chart performance for "Leave a Little Love"
Chart (2024)	Position
Hungary (Dance Top 40)	48

2025 year-end chart performance for "Leave a Little Love"
Chart (2025)	Position
Hungary (Dance Top 40)	31

== Certifications ==
Certifications for "Leave a Little Love"
Region	Certification	Certified units/sales
Netherlands (NVPI)	Gold	40,000^{‡}
^{‡} Sales+streaming figures based on certification alone.

== Release history ==
Release history and versions for "Leave a Little Love"
Region	Date	Format	Version	Label	Ref.
Various	25 February 2021	Digital download; streaming	Original	Kontor; Universal	
Various	12 March 2021	Digital download; streaming	Club mix	Armind	
