= Balance (Armin van Buuren album) =

Studio album by Armin van Buuren
- Released: 25 October 2019
- Recorded: 2017–2019
- Genre: Dance-pop
- Length: 90:28
- Label: Armada; Kontor; SME
- Producer: Armin van Buuren (exec.); Benno de Goeij (exec.); Garibay; Avalan; Valentijn Hoogwerf; Avian Grays; Toby Gad; Josh Cumbee; AFSHeeN; Kevin Saunderson; Rasmus Svensson-Blixt; Jesse Wilson; Tierce Person; Angel Lopez; Scott Storch; Lucas & Steve; Shapov; Above & Beyond; BT; Tempo Giusto; Luke Bond

Armin van Buuren chronology
A State of Trance 2019 (2019)	Balance (2019)	A State of Trance 2020 (2020)

Singles from Balance
- 1. "I Need You" Released: 6 January 2017; 2. "Sunny Days" Released: 16 June 2017; 3. "Sex, Love & Water" Released: 2 February 2018; 4. "Therapy" Released: 20 April 2018; 5. "Blah Blah Blah" Released: 18 May 2018; 6. "Wild Wild Son" Released: 12 October 2018; 7. "Lonely for You" Released: 15 February 2019; 8. "Show Me Love" Released: 1 March 2019; 9. "Turn It Up" Released: 15 March 2019; 10. "Don't Give Up on Me" Released: 29 March 2019; 11. "La Résistance de l'Amour" Released: 12 April 2019; 12. "Phone Down" Released: 19 April 2019; 13. "Revolution" Released: 7 June 2019; 14. "Something Real" Released: 12 July 2019; 15. "Stickup" Released: 9 August 2019; 16. "Waking Up with You" Released: 6 September 2019; 17. "Mr. Navigator" Released: 13 September 2019; 18. "It Could Be" Released: 20 September 2019; 19. "High on Your Love" Released: 27 September 2019; 20. "Don't Let Me Go" Released: 4 October 2019; 21. "All Comes Down" Released: 11 October 2019; 22. "Unlove You" Released: 18 October 2019; 23. "Million Voices" Released: 25 October 2019; 24. "Sucker for Love" Released: 26 October 2019; 25. "Miles Away" Released: 27 October 2019; 26. "Runaway" Released: 28 October 2019; 27. "Always" Released: 29 October 2019; 28. "Song I Sing" Released: 30 October 2019

Balance is the seventh studio album by Dutch DJ and record producer Armin van Buuren. It was released in 25 October 2019 through Armada Music, succeeding his 2015 album Embrace. It was also released as a double album with each part consisting of 14 tracks. It features collaborations with Above & Beyond, BT, Lucas & Steve, Garibay, Inner City, Shapov, Rudimental, Tempo Giusto, Ne-Yo and Haliene.

== Critical reception ==
Rachel Narozniak from Dancing Astronaut wrote that Balance "emblematizes the artistic diligence" driving van Buuren since his debut appearance, while comprising a "broad assembly of dance styles, anthemic chord progressions, vocal-centric constructions, and ear-catching lyrical concepts and hooks". She praised the variety of both dance-pop and trance tracks within the album, which Narozniak felt showed van Buuren's willingness to go beyond his "sonic comfort zone" of producing traditional trance music.

== Track listing ==
Track details and metadata adapted from Apple Music.

Side 1
No.	Title	Writer(s)	Producer(s)	Length
1.	"Sucker for Love" (with Avalan)	Armin van Buuren; Benno de Goeij; Valentijn Hoogwerf; Julien Vahle	Armin van Buuren; Avalan; de Goeij; Hoogwerf	2:56
2.	"Something Real" (with Avian Grays featuring Jordan Shaw)	Armin van Buuren; Avian Grays; de Goeij; Andreas Moe; Eelke Kalberg; Ryan Fieret; Jeffrey Sutorius; Sebastian Molijn; Jesse Draak; Jordan Shaw	Armin van Buuren; Avian Grays	2:59
3.	"Wild Wild Son" (featuring Sam Martin)	Armin van Buuren; de Goeij; Samuel Martin	Armin van Buuren; de Goeij	3:33
4.	"Phone Down" (with Garibay featuring Justin Stein)	Armin van Buuren; de Goeij; Fernando Garibay; Justin Stein; Ramiro Padilla	Armin van Buuren; de Goeij; Garibay	3:12
5.	"Blah Blah Blah"	Armin van Buuren; Andrew Bullimore; Joshua Record	Armin van Buuren	3:03
6.	"Sunny Days" (featuring Josh Cumbee)	Armin van Buuren; de Goeij; Gordon Goothredde; Tobias Gad; Josh Cumbee; Afshin Salmani	Armin van Buuren; Toby Gad; AFSHeeN; Cumbee	3:30
7.	"Runaway" (featuring Candace Sosa)	Armin van Buuren; de Goeij; Candace Nicole Sosa; Jordan Young	Armin van Buuren; de Goeij	3:57
8.	"It Could Be" (vs. Inner City)	Armin van Buuren; de Goeij; Kevin Saunderson; Rasmus Svensson-Blixt; Moa Hammar	Armin van Buuren; Saunderson; Svensson-Blixt	2:37
9.	"Unlove You" (featuring Ne-Yo)	Armin van Buuren; de Goeij; Jesse Wilson; Shaffer Smith; Tierce Person	Armin van Buuren; de Goeij; Wilson; Person	2:30
10.	"Therapy" (featuring James Newman)	Armin van Buuren; de Goeij; James Newman; Michael Busbee	Armin van Buuren; de Goeij	3:06
11.	"Waking Up with You" (featuring David Hodges)	Armin van Buuren; de Goeij; Jaden Michaels; David Hodges; David Naish	Armin van Buuren	2:59
12.	"Sex, Love & Water" (featuring Conrad Sewell)	Armin van Buuren; Angel Lopez; Scott Storch; Conrad Sewell; Fiora Cutler; Charles Reece	Armin van Buuren; Lopez; Storch	3:17
13.	"Don't Give Up on Me" (with Lucas & Steve featuring Josh Cumbee)	Armin van Buuren; Lucas De Wart; Steven Jansen; Cumbee; Salmani	Armin van Buuren; Lucas & Steve	3:05
14.	"Don't Let Me Go" (featuring Matluck)	Armin van Buuren; de Goeij; Roel Schutrups; Diederik Bakker; Maxwell Elliot; Federico Vindver; Jesse Draak	Armin van Buuren; de Goeij; Schutrups; Bakker; Draak	3:15
Total length:				43:59

Side 2
No.	Title	Writer(s)	Producer(s)	Length
15.	"La résistance de l'amour" (vs. Shapov)	Armin van Buuren; Alexander Shapovalov	Armin van Buuren; Shapov	3:31
16.	"Million Voices"	Armin van Buuren; de Goeij; Bullimore; Record; Alistair Lloyd-Webber	Armin van Buuren; de Goeij	3:07
17.	"Show Me Love" (vs. Above & Beyond)	Armin van Buuren; de Goeij; Jonathan Grant; Anthony McGuinness; Paavo Siljamaki	Armin van Buuren; de Goeij; Above & Beyond	3:31
18.	"Song I Sing" (featuring HALIENE)	Armin van Buuren; de Goeij; Kelly Sweet; Matthew Steeper	Armin van Buuren; de Goeij	4:22
19.	"High on Your Love" (with Rudimental featuring James Newman)	Armin van Buuren; de Goeij; Amir Izadkhah; Piers Aggett; Kesi Dryden; Jonathan Harris; Daniel Watts; Newman	Armin van Buuren; de Goeij	3:08
20.	"I Need You" (with Garibay featuring Olaf Blackwood)	Armin van Buuren; de Goeij; Garibay; Olaf Blackwood	Armin van Buuren; Garibay	3:26
21.	"Lonely for You" (featuring Bonnie McKee)	Armin van Buuren; de Goeij; Bonnie Leigh McKee; Jessica Malakouti	Armin van Buuren; de Goeij	3:13
22.	"Always" (with BT featuring Nation of One)	Armin van Buuren; de Goeij; Brian Transeau; Kristi Krings	Armin van Buuren; BT; de Goeij	3:39
23.	"Turn It Up"	Armin van Buuren; Ki McPhail; Duck Blackwell	Armin van Buuren	2:52
24.	"Mr. Navigator" (vs. Tempo Giusto)	Armin van Buuren; Tuomas Lähteenoja	Armin van Buuren; Tempo Giusto	2:32
25.	"Revolution" (with Luke Bond featuring KARRA)	Armin van Buuren; Lucas Bond; Karra Jillian Madden	Armin van Buuren; Luke Bond	3:16
26.	"All Comes Down" (featuring Cimo Frankel)	Armin van Buuren; de Goeij; Cimo Frankel; Yoshi Green; Rik Anemma	Armin van Buuren; de Goeij	3:17
27.	"Miles Away" (featuring Sam Martin)	Armin van Buuren; de Goeij; Martin	Armin van Buuren; de Goeij	3:46
28.	"Stickup"	Armin van Buuren; de Goeij	Armin van Buuren; de Goeij	2:49
Total length:				46:29

== Charts ==
Chart (2019)	Peak position
Austrian Albums (Ö3 Austria)	70
Belgian Albums (Ultratop Flanders)	47
Belgian Albums (Ultratop Wallonia)	99
Czech Albums (ČNS IFPI)	70
Dutch Albums (Album Top 100)	11
German Albums (Offizielle Top 100)	45
Polish Albums (ZPAV)	15
Scottish Albums (OCC)	77
Slovak Albums (ČNS IFPI)	55
Swiss Albums (Schweizer Hitparade)	52
UK Dance Albums (OCC)	1
US Top Dance Albums (Billboard)	13

== Certifications ==
Region	Certification	Certified units/sales
Netherlands (NVPI)	Gold	20,000^{‡}
^{‡} Sales+streaming figures based on certification alone.
