= Sunny Days (Armin van Buuren song) =

- Radio version

Single by Armin van Buuren featuring Josh Cumbee

from the album Balance
- Released: 16 June 2017
- Genre: Deep house; dance-pop (radio version); Progressive trance (club mix)
- Length: 3:30
- Label: Armada; Armind
- Songwriter(s): Armin van Buuren; Benno de Goeij; Afshin Salmani; Josh Cumbee; Toby Gad; Gordon Groothedde
- Producer(s): Armin van Buuren; AFSHeeN; Josh Cumbee; Toby Gad

Armin van Buuren singles chronology
| "My Symphony (The Best of Armin Only Anthem)" (2017) | "Sunny Days" (2017) | "You Are" (2017) |

Josh Cumbee singles chronology
| "Sunny Days" (2017) | "Christmas Days" (2017) |

Alternative cover
- Club mix

"Sunny Days" is a song by Dutch DJ and record producer Armin van Buuren. It features the vocals from American singer-songwriter Josh Cumbee. The song was released in the Netherlands by Armada Music as a digital download on 16 June 2017. The song was written by Armin van Buuren, Benno de Goeij, Afshin Salmani, Josh Cumbee, Toby Gad and Gordon Groothedde, and it was produced by van Buuren, Salmani, Cumbee, and Gad. Single received double platinum status in the Netherlands. The song serves as the second single from van Buuren's seventh album Balance.

== Music video ==
=== Production ===
The music video was shot in Bevagna and Assisi, Italy, in three days. However, while Armin van Buuren stayed a whole week in Bevagna to write the music video, the scenes with him were shot in one day.

== Track listing ==
- Digital download
1. "Sunny Days" – 3:30
- Digital download – extended club mix
1. "Sunny Days" (extended club mix) – 6:30

== Charts ==
=== Weekly charts ===
| Chart (2017) | Peak position |
|---|---|
| Belgium (Ultratip Bubbling Under Flanders) | 37 |
| Belgium (Ultratip Bubbling Under Wallonia) | 10 |
| Netherlands (Dutch Top 40) | 4 |
| Netherlands (Single Top 100) | 19 |
| Slovakia (Rádio Top 100) | 49 |
| US Hot Dance/Electronic Songs (Billboard) | 43 |
| US Dance/Mix Show Airplay (Billboard) | 10 |

=== Year-end charts ===
| Chart (2017) | Position |
|---|---|
| Netherlands (Dutch Top 40) | 15 |
| Netherlands (Single Top 100) | 79 |

== Certifications ==
| Region | Certification | Certified units/sales |
|---|---|---|
| Netherlands (NVPI) | 2× Platinum | 80,000^{‡} |
^{‡} Sales+streaming figures based on certification alone.
