= Chef'Special =

Dutch indie pop band

- Origin: Haarlem, Netherlands
- Genres: Indie pop; funk; hip hop; rock; ska
- Years active: 2008–present
- Labels: Kaiser Records; Fueled by Ramen
- Members: Jan Derks; Wouter Heeren; Guido Joseph; Joshua Nolet; Wouter Jerry Prudon
- Website: chefspecialmusic.com

Chef'Special is a Dutch indie pop band from Haarlem, North Holland. The band's lineup consists of lead vocalist Joshua Nolet, guitarist Guido Joseph, bass player Jan Derks, keyboard player Wouter Heeren and drummer Wouter Jerry Prudon. They have released five albums and three EPs since their formation in 2008. They became known in the Netherlands for being house band for the popular Dutch TV program De Wereld Draait Door in 2011.

== Career ==
In 2015 the band went on its first US tour as support act for indie band Aer. They have joined Twenty One Pilots on their Emotional Roadshow World Tour as an opening act in the summer of 2016, alongside Mutemath.

In February 2016 the band's song "In Your Arms" charted at position 40 in Billboard's Alternative Songs chart.

The band became War Child ambassadors in November 2020, for the 160 million children growing up in conflict. Chef’Special joined forces with jewellery designer Bas Verdonk to design a fundraising charm for the War Child Bracelet – which contains links made from the melted down steel from an AK-47 machine gun.

Band member Joshua Nolet was one of the contestants in the twenty-first season of the Dutch television series Wie is de Mol? (Who is the Mole?).

== Band members ==
- Jan Derks – bass guitar, vocals, percussion (2008–present)
- Guido "G" Joseph – guitars, samples, backing vocals (2008–present)
- Wouter "Dub" Heeren – keyboards, synthesizers, organs, melodica, backing vocals (2008–present)
- Joshua Nolet – lead vocals (2008–present)
- Wouter Jerry Prudon – drums, percussion (2008–present)

== Discography ==
=== Studio albums ===
Title	Year	Peak chart positions	Certifications
Title	Year	NLD	Certifications
One for the Mrs.	2011	25	
Passing Through	2014	1	
Amigo	2017	2	NVPI: Platinum
Unfold	2020	1	
New Gold	2024	5	

=== Extended plays ===
Title	Year
Hungry (Self-published)	2009
Shot in the Dark	2015
Chef'Special EP (US release, Fueled by Ramen)	2015

=== Singles ===
Title	Year	Peak chart positions			Album / EP
Title	Year	NLD Dutch Top 40	NLD Single Top 100	US Alt	Album / EP
"Birds"	2011	Tip1*	48	–	One for the Mrs.
"Thank Life For"	2011	–	89	–	
"In Your Arms"	2014	20	17	29	Passing Through
"On Shoulders"	2014	Tip1*	–	–	Passing Through
"Still Don't Know"	2015	Tip3*	–	–	Passing Through
"Amigo"	2016	Tip2*	–	–	Amigo EP
"Try Again"	2017	18	–	–	Amigo EP
"Because I Love You"	2017	Tip18*	–	–	Amigo EP
"Nicotine"	2018	19	46	–	Amigo EP
"Into the Future"	2018	28	–	–	Amigo EP
"Trouble"	2020	32	49	–	Unfold
"Maybe This Is Love"	2020	Tip4	–	–	Unfold
"Kaleidoscope"	2020	Tip28*	–	–	Unfold
"Afraid of the Dark"	2021	2	12	–	Non-album single
"Miracles"	2023	25	64	–	New Gold
"Speed of Light"	2023	14	41	–	New Gold
"Fly Like Me"	2024	26	77	–	New Gold
"Larger Than Life" (with Armin van Buuren)	2024	19	77	–	Non-album singles
"C'est la Vie"	2025	16	53	–	Non-album singles
"If Not Now Then When"	2025	37	–	–	Non-album singles

*Tip means the release did not chart on the Dutch Top 40, but appeared on the Tipparade for "bubbling under" hits
