= List of Dragons' Den (British TV programme) offers Series 11-20 =

The following is a list of offers made on the British reality television series Dragons' Den in Series 11–20, aired during 2013–2023. 118 episodes were broadcast consisting of at least 893 pitches. A total of 182 pitches were successful, with 31 offers from the dragons rejected by the entrepreneurs and 680 failing to receive an offer of investment.

== Series overview ==
| Series | Episodes | Start | End | Network |
|---|---|---|---|---|
| Series 11 (2013) | 12 | 11 August 2013 | 2 March 2014 | BBC Two |
| Series 12 (2014) | 12 | 20 July 2014 | 15 March 2015 | BBC Two |
| Series 13 (2015) | 15 | 12 July 2015 | 21 February 2016 | BBC Two |
| Series 14 (2016) | 16 | 24 July 2016 | 26 February 2017 | BBC Two |
| Series 15 (2017) | 16 | 20 August 2017 | 18 February 2018 | BBC Two |
| Series 16 (2018) | 15 | 12 August 2018 | 3 February 2019 | BBC Two |
| Series 17 (2020) | 14 | 11 August 2019 | 12 April 2020 | BBC Two |
| Series 18 (2021) | 14 | 1 April 2021 | 8 July 2021 | BBC One |
| Series 19 (2022) | 14 | 16 January 2022 | 7 April 2022 | BBC One |
| Series 20 (2023) | 14 | 5 January 2023 | 6 April 2023 | BBC One |

== Successful pitches ==
=== Series 11 ===
| Episode | First aired | Entrepreneur(s) | Company or product name | Money requested (£) | Equity Given % | Description of product | Investing Dragon(s) | Result After Filming | Website | Fate |
|---|---|---|---|---|---|---|---|---|---|---|
| Episode 1 | 11 August 2013 | Kate Cotton and Louise Ferguson | Skinny Tan | 60,000 | 10 | Naturally derived tanning lotion and cellulite-reducing cream | Piers Linney and Kelly Hoppen | Signed (Note: Skinny Tan was sold to InnovaDerma in 2015. Piers Linney and Kelly Hoppen nonetheless retained an increased individual share at 10% each.) | | Sold (2015) |
| Episode 1 | 11 August 2013 | Ross Mendham | Bare Naked Foods | 60,000 | 50 | Low-carb, low calorie, gluten-free noodles and pasta | Peter Jones | Signed | | Active |
| Episode 2 | 18 August 2013 | Donna Kerr-Foley | The Running Mat | 50,000 | 40 | Portable wearable exercise mat and boot-camp business | Deborah Meaden and Kelly Hoppen | Signed (Note: The Running Mat did receive investment, however the company was dissolved by 2017.) | | Dissolved (2017) |
| Episode 2 | 18 August 2013 | Joe Walters | Original Jerky (renamed Texas Joe's) | 37,500 (received £50,000) | 24 | Flavoured beef jerky snack | Peter Jones | Failed (Note: Original Jerky did not receive investment after filming. Company was renamed Texas Joe's before being dissolved as of 2019.) | | Dissolved (2019) |
| Episode 3 | 25 August 2013 | Richard Ernest | RemPods | 100,000 | 45% (40% if targets are met.) | Small pop-up rooms set up from past decades used to calm people who have dementia | Deborah Meaden and Peter Jones | Signed | | Liquidation (2023) |
| Episode 4 | 1 September 2013 | Cheryl and Michael MacDonald | YogaBellies | 50,000 | 35% (20% after initial investment returned.) | Franchise business for yoga classes for pregnant women and mothers and their babies | Duncan Bannatyne | Failed (Note: YogaBellies declined Bannatyne's investment after filming. Cheryl MacDonald stated she felt he wasn't the right investor for the business, whilst also suggesting they would have preferred a female investor. UK company dissolved by 2024, however remains active in Singapore.) | | Dissolved (2024) |
| Episode 6 | 15 September 2013 | Chris Rea and Tom Carson | Young Ones | 75,000 | 40 | Clothing and accessories company aimed at university and college students | Duncan Bannatyne | Failed (Note: Young Ones declined the investment after filming, stating they felt Bannatyne did not share their creative direction for the business. Dissolved by 2021) | | Dissolved (2021) |
| Episode 7 | 26 January 2014 | Rob Tominey and Aden Levin | Mainstage Travel (renamed Mainstage Festivals) | 100,000 | 15 | Package holiday tour operator | Piers Linney | Signed | | Active |
| Episode 7 | 26 January 2014 | Oliver Murphy | Reviveaphone (renamed LikeWize Repair) | 50,000 | 25 | Repair kit for water-damaged mobile phones | Kelly Hoppen | Signed | | Active |
| Episode 8 | 2 February 2014 | Amer Hasan | Minicabit | 75,000 | 35 | Website and mobile phone app for booking and comparing mini-cabs | Peter Jones and Deborah Meaden | Failed (Note: Minicabit rejected Jones and Meaden's offer after filming. Amer Hasan stated that giving away such a high percentage caused conflict with his other investors. Company continues to trade and Hasan has cited his appearance on the show with boosting the company's success. Remains active.) | | Active |
| Episode 9 | 9 February 2014 | Carrie Bate | The Little Coffee Bag Co. | 100,000 | 33⅓ | Coffee bag company | Peter Jones and Deborah Meaden | Failed (Note: The Little Coffee Bag Company declined investment after filming. Carrie Bate cited she was already in talks with EasyJet and Virgin Trains and subsequently felt the company did not need the investment. Remains active.) | | Active |
| Episode 9 | 9 February 2014 | Vini and Bal Aujla | Vini & Bal's Rustic Indian | 50,000 | 30 | Chilled, fresh Indian cook-in sauces | Piers Linney | Signed | | Dissolved (2021) |
| Episode 11 | 23 February 2014 | Brian O'Reilly | EnergyEGG (renamed Egg Lighting) | 50,000 | 30% | Energy-saving automatic sensors to switch off appliances when not needed | Piers Linney | Failed (Note: EnergyEGG's investment talks broke down after filming. Brian O'Reilly stated Piers Linney's investment conditions caused conflict with other investors as the deal was dependent on equity being taken away from them. Remains active.) | | Active |
| Episode 11 | 23 February 2014 | Jo Kerley | JK Worldwide (PlayAway Case) | 60,000 | 35 | Children's suitcases and games system combined | Duncan Bannatyne | Failed (Note: PlayAway Case's investment broke down after filming due to Bannantyne's concerns over the overall financing of the business. Jo Kerly resigned as director in 2014 and the company was dissolved by 2016.) | | Dissolved (2016) |
| Episode 12 | 2 March 2014 | James Roupell | Bobo Buddies | 50,000 | 40 (30% after money invested is repaid) | Backpack, pillow and blanket in one. | Peter Jones and Deborah Meaden | Failed (Note: BoboBuddies declined the investment after filming, deciding to search for cheaper options elsewhere. Remains active.) | | Active |

=== Series 12 ===
| Episode | First aired | Entrepreneur(s) | Company or product name | Money requested (£) | Equity Given % | Description of product | Investing Dragon(s) | Result After Filming | Website | Fate |
|---|---|---|---|---|---|---|---|---|---|---|
| Episode 1 | 20 July 2014 | Scott Cupit | Swing Patrol London | 65,000 | 20 | Swing dancing classes in London | Deborah Meaden | Signed | | Active |
| Episode 1 | 20 July 2014 | Jennifer Duthie | Skribbies | 60,000 | 25 | Kids' shoes which can be drawn on | Piers Linney and Kelly Hoppen | Unclear (Note: Skribbies have publicly stated their investment was successful and continue to trade, however there is no official record of the dragon's investment being made. Dissolved in 2022.) | | Dissolved (2022) |
| Episode 2 | 27 July 2014 | Johnny Shimmin and Annie Morris | Spoon | 50,000 | 30 | Breakfast cereal | Deborah Meaden and Peter Jones | Signed (Note: With only one year of profitability in the company during the time of their investment occurring in 2017, the confirmation statement dated 7 October 2018 shows that both Deborah Meaden and Peter Jones exited the business in 2018.) | | Active |
| Episode 2 | 27 July 2014 | Asi Sharabi and David Cadji-Newby | Lost my Name | 100,000 | 5 | Personalised children's books | Piers Linney | Signed (Note: Lost my Name's investment was completed and Piers Linney now owns a 3.42% share from his initial 5% at £100,000. This remains the highest ever valuation in the history of the show. Remains active.) | | Active |
| Episode 3 | 3 August 2014 | Philip Perera & Omar Farag | The Teabox Company (renamed as Phom Teas) | 50,000 | 25% (20% once some of the money invested is repaid) | Loose leaf tea | Kelly Hoppen | Failed (Note: Phom Teas' investment broke down after filming, however Kelly Hoppen continued to advise the business. Company was dissolved in 2018.) | | Dissolved (2018) |
| Episode 3 | 3 August 2014 | Ralph Broadbent and Alex Dixon | Victor's Drinks | 40,000 | 25 | Make your own cider | Duncan Bannatyne | Failed (Note: Victor's Drinks did not receive investment. They stated that whilst they enjoyed their time in the den, within the 8 month wait to appear on the show from the time of applying the business had grown to a point that they felt they didn't need investment. Remains active.) | | Active |
| Episode 4 | 10 August 2014 | Tracy Baker | Umbrands | 60,000 | 35 | Nanotech suction technology (UK distribution rights) | Duncan Bannatyne | Failed (Note: Umbrands' investment was withdrawn after Bannatyne discovered Tracey Baker's fiancée and business partner was a murder suspect, who has since been convicted. Remains active.) | | Active |
| Episode 5 | 17 August 2014 | Jordan Daykin | GripIt Fixings | 80,000 | 25 | Plasterboard fixings | Deborah Meaden | Signed | | Active |
| Episode 6 | 24 August 2014 | Richard McLuckie and Stuart McKenzie-Walker | Pants On Fire Games Ltd | 50,000 | 40 (30% once money invested is repaid.) | Board games and party games | Peter Jones and Duncan Bannatyne | Failed (Note: Pants On Fire Games did not receive investment. Company dissolved by 2021.) | | Dissolved (2021) |
| Episode 6 | 24 August 2014 | Effie Moss | Just For Tiny People (renamed Fun With Mum) | 50,000 | 25 | Handcrafted tents and accessories | Deborah Meaden | Signed (Note: Just For Tiny People received investment after Meaden increased her share by 0.73% following filming. Company was dissolved in 2020.) | | Dissolved (2020) |
| Episode 7 | 25 January 2015 | Ally Stevenson | Clean Heels Ltd | 50,000 | 25 | High heel attachments to prevent sinking in grass and damage to floors | Deborah Meaden and Kelly Hoppen | Signed | | Active |
| Episode 7 | 25 January 2015 | Nicky Fletcher | Equisafety Ltd | 100,000 | 30 | High-visibility clothing and gear | Piers Linney and Duncan Bannatyne | Failed (Note: Equisafety did not receive investment. Company continues to trade.) | | Active |
| Episode 7 | 25 January 2015 | Hyrum and Joshua Cook | Zeven Media | 50,000 | 25 (20% once money invested is repaid) | Photo-booth rental and sales | Deborah Meaden | Signed (Note: Zeven Media's investment was completed, however the company failed to break even and was dissolved in 2020.) | | Dissolved (2020) |
| Episode 8 | 1 February 2015 | Rajan Jerath | iGlove | 75,000 | 40 (30% if targets are met.) | Touch screen gloves | Duncan Bannatyne | Failed (Note: iGlove failed due diligence due to Bannatyne's citing that Apple already owned a patent to the glove. Company continues to trade.) | | Active |
| Episode 8 | 1 February 2015 | Angela McLean and Jessica McCarthy | Baggers Originals | 100,000 | 30 | Children's rainwear | Peter Jones and Deborah Meaden | Failed (Note: Baggers Originals declined the investment after filming. Company dissolved by 2018.) | | Dissolved (2018) |
| Episode 9 | 8 February 2015 | Levi Young and Dana Zingher | Enclothed | 70,000 | 15 | Men's online clothing and delivery service | Piers Linney and Kelly Hoppen | Failed (Note: Enclothed declined the investment after filming, stating the business had grown faster than expected and no longer needed the dragons help. Company was sold in 2018.) | | Sold (2018) |
| Episode 10 | 15 February 2015 | Yee Kwan Chan | Yee Kwan | 50,000 | 30 | East Asian ice cream and sorbet company | Deborah Meaden | Signed | | Active |
| Episode 11 | 22 February 2015 | Ryan O'Rorke | Flavourly | 75,000 | 20 | Food and snack box delivery service | Peter Jones and Piers Linney | Failed (Note: Flavourly rejected the investment after filming, opting to raise money through crowdfunding instead. He later secured £515,000 from a total of 339 investors in return for 34% equity. Company was sold in 2017.) | | Sold (2017) |
| Episode 11 | 22 February 2015 | John and Sam Ford | Seabung | 50,000 | 20 | Boat valve maintenance plug | Deborah Meaden and Kelly Hoppen | Signed | | Active |
| Episode 12 | 15 March 2015 | Ross Gourlay | Nae Danger & Glencrest | 200,000 | 30 | Sports & energy drink and cash & carry business | Peter Jones and Duncan Bannatyne | Failed (Note: Nae Danger & Glencrest's investment did not complete after filming. Company continues to trade.) | | Active |

=== Series 13 ===
| Episode | First aired | Entrepreneur(s) | Company or product name | Money requested (£) | Equity Given % | Description of product | Investing Dragon(s) | Result After Filming | Website | Fate |
|---|---|---|---|---|---|---|---|---|---|---|
| Episode 1 | 12 July 2015 | Ben Fridja | Fridja | 70,000 | 25 | Home appliances retailer, including clothes steamer | Deborah Meaden and Nick Jenkins | Failed (Note: Fridja's investment does not appear to have been completed. Company continues to trade.) | | Active |
| Episode 1 | 12 July 2015 | Thierry Giunta | BeamBlock | 50,000 | 50 | Yoga equipment and workout system | Peter Jones and Touker Suleyman | Signed (Note: BeamBlock's investment was completed, however the company has dissolved as of 2019.) | | Dissolved (2019) |
| Episode 2 | 19 July 2015 | Chika Russell | Chika's Foods | 30,000 | 25 | African snacks business | Peter Jones | Failed (Note: Chika's declined investment after filming and opted to continue without Peter Jones. Company in liquidation as of 2024.) | | Liquidation (2024) |
| Episode 2 | 19 July 2015 | Graeme and Fiona Fraser-Bell | Accentuate | 45,000 | 40 (25% once money invested is repaid) | "Guess-the-accent" board game | Peter Jones | Signed | | Active |
| Episode 2 | 19 July 2015 | Linus Gorpe | The Raw Chocolate Company | 72,000 | 10 | Raw chocolate bars, dried fruit and superfoods | Deborah Meaden | Failed (Note: The Raw Chocolate Company's investment did not complete. Company fell into financial difficulty and merged with Conscious Chocolate in 2018.) | | Sold (2018) |
| Episode 3 | 26 July 2015 | Steve Noyes and Duncan Summers | Sync-box | 55,000 | 35 (With option to buy back 5% within 12 months) | Recessed and covered power and AV outlet | Deborah Meaden | Signed | | Dissolved (2024) |
| Episode 4 | 2 August 2015 | John Tague | Tags Snack Foods Ltd | 125,000 | 30 (20% after investment is repaid) | Potato crisps business | Peter Jones and Deborah Meaden | Failed (Note: Tags Snack Foods's investment did not complete after filming. Tiger Mobiles suggested neither party was comfortable with the amount of equity given away at the end of pitch and presumed this to be the main factor. Company dissolved in 2020.) | | Dissolved (2020) |
| Episode 4 | 2 August 2015 | Sarah Reast and Phil Wilson | Timberkits Ltd | 25,000 (received 40,000) | 30 | Wooden mechanical kits | Touker Suleyman | Signed | | Active |
| Episode 5 | 9 August 2015 | Polly Gotschi | Vitiliglow | 37,500 (received 40,000) | 40 | Skin foundation for vitiligo sufferers | Sarah Willingham | Failed (Note: Vitiliglow's investment does not appear to have been completed after filming. Remains active.) | | Active |
| Episode 6 | 16 August 2015 | Amy Wordsworth | Ella Banks Ltd (Good Bubble) | 60,000 | 40 | Naturally formulated bathtime products for children | Deborah Meaden | Signed (Note: Ella Banks's investment was completed. Meaden later reduced her equity to 29.94%, before exiting the company in 2020. Remains active.) | | Active |
| Episode 6 | 16 August 2015 | Ben and Sue Youn | Yogiyo | 50,000 | 33⅓ | Korean home cooking range | Peter Jones | Signed | | Active |
| Episode 7 | 23 August 2015 | Marc Wileman | Sublime Science | 50,000 | 10 | Science-themed children's birthday parties and workshops | Nick Jenkins and Sarah Willingham | Signed | | In administration (2024) |
| Episode 9 | 6 September 2015 | Steve Shickell and Tony Garlick | Magloc UK | 100,000 | 40 | Magnetic dog and equine lead connector | Nick Jenkins | Failed (Note: Magloc UK's investment does not appear to have been completed. Remains active.) | | Active |
| Episode 10 | 27 December 2015 | Gary MacDonough, Loren Gould and Ben Greenock | Double | 75,000 | 15 | Online double-dating app | Nick Jenkins | Signed | | Dissolved (2018) |
| Episode 11 | 3 January 2016 | Caner Veli | Liquiproof | 100,000 | 50 | Waterproof coating for footwear, hats and clothing | Touker Suleyman | Signed (Note: Liquiproof's investment was completed, however Touker Suleyman exited the company in 2018. Remains active.) | | Active |
| Episode 11 | 3 January 2016 | Deepak Tailor | Latest Free Stuff | 50,000 | 10 | Free sample website | Deborah Meaden | Signed | | Active |
| Episode 12 | 10 January 2016 | Lloyd Haxell and Tasha Harris | Grounded Body Scrub | 30,000 | 45 | Coffee-based body scrub | Sarah Willingham | Failed (Note: Grounded Body Scrub's investment did not complete. Remains active.) | | Active |
| Episode 12 | 10 January 2016 | Pete Ancketill | Glassbusters | 200,000 | 30 | Glass compacting creating Eco-Sand | Nick Jenkins | Unclear (Note: Glassbusters investment status remains unclear. Ancketill does not appear to have commented on the investment since and there is no record of Jenkins being listed as a shareholder or a director. Company in liquidation as of 2023.) | | Liquidation (2023 |
| Episode 12 | 10 January 2016 | Spencer Turner | Tegology | 45,000 | 25 | Portable camping stove and charging device | Peter Jones | Signed | | Dissolved (2020) |
| Episode 13 | 24 January 2016 | Ben Mason | Masons Beans | 50,000 | 20 | Freshly cooked, baked beans | Nick Jenkins | Signed (Note: Masons Beans investment was completed, however the company was dissolved by 2017.) | | Dissolved (2017) |
| Episode 14 | 31 January 2016 | David Kendall | Slappie Ltd | 50,000 | 45 | "Slap-on" wrist watches | Nick Jenkins | Signed | | Dissolved (2020) |
| Episode 14 | 31 January 2016 | Jonathan Harris and Jonathan Schofield | Opus | 80,000 | 25 | Trailer tents | Deborah Meaden | Failed (Note: Opus's investment did not complete following filming. Tiger Mobiles have suggested Harris and Schofield failed to clarify whether Meaden was investing in another brand mentioned, named Purple Line, or just the Opus brand. Remains active.) | | Active |
| Episode 14 | 31 January 2016 | Morag Ekanger and Paz Sarmah | Bad Brownie | 60,000 | 30 | Gourmet-flavoured chocolate brownies | Touker Suleyman | Signed | | Active |
| Episode 15 | 21 February 2016 | Kath Harrop | Mum2Mum market | 35,000 | 25 | Babies and children's "nearly-new" sales | Deborah Meaden | Unclear (Note: Mum2Mum market's investment status remains unclear. Company continues to say the investment was successful, however there is no record of Meaden being listed as a shareholder or a director.) | | Active |

=== Series 14 ===
| Episode | First aired | Entrepreneur(s) | Company or product name | Money requested (£) | Equity Given % | Description of product | Investing Dragon(s) | Result After Filming | Website | Fate |
|---|---|---|---|---|---|---|---|---|---|---|
| Episode 1 | 24 July 2016 | John Burke and Jon Hulme | Craft Clubs Ltd | 75,000 | 12.5 | Craft gin subscription business | Sarah Willingham | Signed | | Active |
| Episode 1 | 24 July 2016 | Rashpal, Gurminder and Amarinder Dhillon | Boot Buddy | 60,000 | 30% | Footwear cleaning product | Peter Jones, Deborah Meaden and Touker Suleyman | Signed | | Active |
| Episode 2 | 31 July 2016 | Danielle Barnett and David Holmes | Light Lead | 70,000 | 35 | Analogue optical musical instrument cable | Touker Suleyman | Failed (Note: Light Lead's investment was never completed. Company was dissolved in 2018.) | | Dissolved (2018) |
| Episode 2 | 31 July 2016 | Andrew Doris | Universal Manhole Key Kit (renamed Dad Machining) | 40,000 | 35 | Universal manhole cover lifting key kit | Deborah Meaden | Failed (Note: Universal Manhole Key Kit's investment was never completed. Remains active.) | | Active |
| Episode 3 | 7 August 2016 | Sarah Sleightolm and Beth Chilton | Iveson & Sage (renamed Hope and Ivy) | 78,000 | 25 (20% once initial investment is repaid.) | Womenswear company | Peter Jones and Deborah Meaden | Signed | | Active |
| Episode 3 | 7 August 2016 | Nick Coleman and Andrew Allen | The Snaffling Pig | 70,000 | 20 (Option to buy back 10% after 18 months) | Gourmet pork scratching snack company | Nick Jenkins | Signed | | Active |
| Episode 4 | 14 August 2016 | Martin Chard and Jenny David | Marxman Limited | 50,000 | 30 | Wall marking tool | Deborah Meaden | Signed | | Active |
| Episode 5 | 21 August 2016 | Jacob Thundil | Cocofina | 75,000 | 20 (Option to buy back 10% of the company for £75,000 in 12 months' time) | Wide range of coconut products | Nick Jenkins and Sarah Willingham | Signed | | Active |
| Episode 6 | 28 August 2016 | Lauren and Mark Taylor | Kokoso Skin Limited | 50,000 | 30 (25% once initial investment is repaid) | Organic coconut oil for baby skincare | Touker Suleyman | Signed (Note: Touker Suleyman is no longer involved with Kokoso Skin Limited as of 2019. Remains active.) | | Active |
| Episode 7 | 4 September 2016 | Jamie Lawlor | Kidsflush | 40,000 | 40 | Musical flushing button for children | Touker Suleyman | Unclear (Note: Kidsflush's investment status remains unclear. There is no record of Suleyman being listed as a shareholder or director. Remains active.) | | Active |
| Episode 8 | 28 December 2016 | Jamie Hutcheon | Cocoa Ooze | 70,000 | 35 (20% once initial investment is repaid.) | Luxury handmade chocolate | Touker Suleyman | Unclear (Note: Cocoa Ooze's investment status remains unclear. Hutcheon stated his pitch was successful, however is no record of Suleyman being listed as a shareholder or director. Company in liquidation as of 2024.) | | Liquidation (2024) |
| Episode 8 | 28 December 2016 | Steven Davis and Matthew Allen | Active Away | 25,000 | 20 (15% once initial investment is repaid.) | Tennis holiday provider | Peter Jones | Signed | | Active |
| Episode 9 | 1 January 2017 | Rachel Day and Merry Whitaker | Love Keep Create | 50,000 | 10 | Keepsake clothing company | Deborah Meaden | Signed | | Active |
| Episode 10 | 8 January 2017 | Vincenz Clemt and Raj Sark | Lupo | 100,000 | 30 | Bluetooth finder and tracker | Peter Jones | Failed (Note: Lupo's investment did not go through. Peter Jones tweeted that some issues arose during due diligence which led to him withdrawing. Lupo later received bad press when it was reported a number of users had complained about the product's durability. Remains active.) | | Active |
| Episode 11 | 15 January 2017 | Rob Manley | Illuminated Apparel | 50,000 | 20 | Interactive glow t-shirts | Deborah Meaden | Failed (Note: Illuminated Apparel's investment did not go through. Rob Manley has since stated he was able to raise funds himself. Remains active.) | | Active |
| Episode 11 | 15 January 2017 | Oliver Gauci | Love Me Beauty | 80,000 | 8 | Beauty products subscription service | Nick Jenkins and Sarah Willingham | Signed | | Active |
| Episode 12 | 29 January 2017 | Agostino Stilli and Luca Amaduzzi | CYCL WingLights | 45,000 | 12.5 | Detachable bicycle indicators | Nick Jenkins | Signed (Note: Nick retained his shareholding in the company until 2020. Remains active.) | | Active |
| Episode 13 | 5 February 2017 | Andrew Watmuff | Watmuff & Beckett | 75,000 | 20 (10% can be bought back if turnover and profit figures are achieved.) | Fresh soup and risotto business | Nick Jenkins | Signed | | Dissolved (2025) |
| Episode 14 | 12 February 2017 | Sinead and Adam Murphy | Shnuggle | 75,000 (received 100,000) | 25 (If targets are met in one year, 10% can be bought back.) | Baby bath and bed products | Touker Suleyman | Failed (Note: Shnuggle declined the investment after filming, stating they had received better offers from alternative sources. Remains active.) | | Active |
| Episode 15 | 19 February 2017 | John Kershaw | M14 Industries | 80,000 | 20 | Dating app platform | Peter Jones and Nick Jenkins | Failed (Note: M14 Industries' investment did not complete. Peter Jones stated that after filming the offer of investment had caused conflict with the company's current investors which led John Kershaw to re-negotiate, to which he and Nick Jenkins declined. Remains active and later purchased dating app 'Double,' who had appeared in series 13.) | | Dissolved (2024) |
| Episode 16 | 26 February 2017 | Simon Heap | Rugged Interactive | 100,000 | 30 | Motivational fitness technology | Peter Jones and Deborah Meaden | Failed (Note: Rugged Interactive's investment did not complete. It was cited that the product was already doing well prior to their appearance and was possibly capable of raising funds without the dragons. Remains active.) | | Active |

=== Series 15 ===
| Episode | First air | Entrepreneur(s) | Company or product name | Money requested (£) | Equity Given % | Description of product | Investing Dragon(s) | Result After Filming | Website | Fate |
|---|---|---|---|---|---|---|---|---|---|---|
| Episode 1 | 20 August 2017 | Julianne Ponan | Creative Nature | 75,000 | 25 | High-protein snack bars, superfoods, and organic baking mixes | Deborah Meaden | Failed (Note: Creative Nature's investment broke down during due diligence. Julianne Ponan has since stated that major supermarket's purchase orders arrived shortly after filming and she no longer felt the need for investment. Remains active.) | | Active |
| Episode 1 | 20 August 2017 | Ben Corrigan and Jonny Plein | Pouch | 75,000 | 18 | A free browser extension which looks to save web users time and money on voucher codes. | Tej Lalvani, Touker Suleyman and Jenny Campbell | Failed (Note: Pouch's investment did not complete as they decided to seek better investment elsewhere. Company appears to have since been sold, circa 2020.) | | Sold (2020) |
| Episode 2 | 27 August 2017 | Mike and Zena Dean | Huxley Hound | 50,000 | 15 | Organic vegetable treats for dogs | Jenny Campbell | Failed (Note: Huxley Hound's investment does not appear to have been completed. Dissolved by 2022.) | | Dissolved (2022) |
| Episode 2 | 27 August 2017 | Liam Sheriff and Craig Newbigin | Natural Nutrients | 100,000 | 40 (35% once the investment is repaid.) | Natural supplements | Peter Jones and Tej Lalvani | Failed (Note: Natural Nutrients' failed due diligence and has since turned to crowd-funding. Remains active.) | | Active |
| Episode 3 | 3 September 2017 | Alex Buzaianu | Temporary Forevers | 90,000 | 35 (25% once the investment is repaid.) | Versatile leather bags designed to carry laptops, gadgets and photography equipment | Peter Jones | Failed (Note: Temporary Forevers investment does not appear to have been completed. Company's UK branch dissolved by 2022, however continues to trade internationally.) | | Dissolved (2022) |
| Episode 3 | 3 September 2017 | Claire Gelder | The Wool Couture Company | 50,000 | 30 | Online retailer for Big wool yarns and finished goods, knitting kits and tools | Tej Lalvani and Touker Suleyman | Signed | | Active |
| Episode 4 | 10 September 2017 | Andy Jefferies and Ben Muller | Dock & Bay | 75,000 | 10 | Beach and travel brand specialising in micro-fibre towel products | Deborah Meaden | Signed | | Active |
| Episode 4 | 10 September 2017 | Sarah Agar-Brennan | Lovebomb Cushions Ltd | 80,000 | 30 | Novelty plush goods based on emojis | Tej Lalvani and Jenny Campbell | Signed | | Dissolved (2021) |
| Episode 5 | 24 September 2017 | Adelle Smith | BKD | 80,000 | 35 | A children's baking brand that combines baking with a craft activity | Peter Jones | Signed | | Dissolved (2020) |
| Episode 6 | 1 October 2017 | Matthew Deasy | The Oomph | 40,000 | 15 | In-cup coffee brewer | Jenny Campbell | Failed (Note: The Oomph's investment did not complete after filming. Deasy stated in the follow up episode 'Dragon's Den: Pitches to Riches' that the terms of Campbell's offer caused conflict with a current investor. Company's UK branch in liquidation by 2022, however continues to trade internationally.) | | Liquidation (2022) |
| Episode 6 | 1 October 2017 | Catherine and Chris Baldrey-Chourio | Nana's Manners | 50,000 | 20 | Children's cutlery | Touker Suleyman | Signed | | Active |
| Episode 7 | 8 October 2017 | Hannah Gourlay | TellTails | 70,000 | 25 | Costume tails | Deborah Meaden | Signed | | Active |
| Episode 8 | 15 October 2017 | Rick Beardsell | ShakeSphere | 75,000 | 30 (20% once the investment is repaid.) | Range of shaker bottles designed for protein and fitness shakes | Tej Lalvani and Deborah Meaden | Signed (Note: In 2021, Beardsell set up a new ownership structure for the business. Meaden sold her shares in February, while Lalvani held his until June. Remains active.) | | Active |
| Episode 8 | 15 October 2017 | Sarah Hilleary | B-Tempted | 75,000 | 40 (30% once the investment is repaid.) | Gluten-free cakes | Tej Lalvani | Signed | | Active |
| Episode 9 | 26 December 2017 | Andrew Pearce | Thortful | 80,000 | 16 (11% once the investment is repaid.) | An online marketplace for greeting cards. | Tej Lalvani and Jenny Campbell | Failed (Note: Thortful's investment does not appear to have been completed. Remains active.) | | Active |
| Episode 9 | 26 December 2017 | Keval Dattani, Kunal Dattani and Savan Dattani | Mo Bros | 150,000 | 20 | A men's grooming retailer specialising in products for beards and moustaches. | Tej Lalvani and Peter Jones | Signed | | Active |
| Episode 10 | 14 January 2018 | John Boff | EcoSpot | 25,000 | 35 | An adjustable mortarboard for bricklayers | Deborah Meaden | Failed (Note: EcoSpot's investment did not complete after filming. Remains active.) | | Active |
| Episode 10 | 14 January 2018 | Corien Staels | Staels Design (wheelAIR) | 75,000 | 30 (20% once the investment is repaid.) | A cooling backrest cushion for wheelchair users | Peter Jones and Deborah Meaden | Failed (Note: Staels Design's investment does not appear to have been completed, with Corien Staels seemingly having raised funding from alternative sources. Company in liquidation as of 2023.) | | Liquidation (2023) |
| Episode 11 | 28 January 2018 | Dylan Watkins and Louise Mackintosh | Poppy's Picnic | 60,000 | 15 | Raw, natural dog food brand | Deborah Meaden | Failed (Note: Poppy's Picnic declined investment following due diligence, stating they had since received better offers from alternative sources. Remains active.) | | Active |
| Episode 11 | 28 January 2018 | Daniel Cheddie | Glazesafe Limited | 60,000 | 30 | Two products which help construction workers safely carry out window repairs and other projects at height | Touker Suleyman and Jenny Campbell | Signed | | Active |
| Episode 12 | 4 February 2018 | Michal Takac and Tim Inskip | Carun UK (Since renamed "CBVIT") | 50,000 | 25 | A specialist organic hemp producer that creates a wide range of Hemp skincare, wellbeing and food supplements | Jenny Campbell | Signed (Note: Carun UK's investment was completed. Campbell sold her equity to CBVIT Holdings in August 2019. Remains active.) | | Active |
| Episode 12 | 4 February 2018 | James Dawson | T Plus (Now TEA+) | 75,000 | 50 | Nutrient rich teas herbal, fruit and green teas with daily essential vitamins | Tej Lalvani | Signed | | Dissolved (2024) |
| Episode 13 | 11 February 2018 | Edward Hollands | DrivenMedia | 30,000 | 20 | Advertising business enabling businesses to advertise on trucks and lorries | Jenny Campbell | Signed | | Dissolved (2024) |
| Episode 13 | 11 February 2018 | Chris Frappell | Chain Monkey | 75,000 | 25 | Motorcycle chain tensioning tool | Touker Suleyman | Signed | | Active |
| Episode 14 | 18 February 2018 | Sophia Ferguson | Tickle Tots | 50,000 | 50 (40% once the investment is repaid.) | Re-usable cloth nappies and accessories | Touker Suleyman | Failed (Note: Tickle Tots' investment was never completed. Sophia Ferguson indicated that Suleyman withdrew his offer following filming. Dissolved by 2024.) | | Dissolved (2024) |
| Episode 14 | 18 February 2018 | Stuart Ingram | House Of Elrick | 80,000 | 10 | Scottish heritage gin | Peter Jones | Failed (Note: House Of Elrick declined Jones' investment after filming, stating he was unaware that Jones was expecting a 10% share in all of his assets, including his home. Remains active.) | | Active |

=== Series 16 ===
| Episode | First aired | Entrepreneur(s) | Company or product name | Money requested (£) | Equity Given % | Description of product | Investing Dragon(s) | Result After Filming | Website | Fate |
|---|---|---|---|---|---|---|---|---|---|---|
| Episode 1 | 12 August 2018 | Sam Piri | VIVIT | 90,000 | 20 (15% once investment is repaid.) | Live anatomy and physiology exhibitions with synthetic bodies and animal specimens. | Deborah Meaden and Peter Jones | Signed | | Active |
| Episode 1 | 12 August 2018 | Yosi Romano and Ziv Leinwand | Brizi | 125,000 | 25 | Device designed for prams and strollers to protect babies and young children from air pollution. | Touker Suleyman | Signed | | Dissolved (2024) |
| Episode 1 | 12 August 2018 | Alex and Rupesh Thomas | Tuk Tuk Chai | 100,000 | 33.3 | Tea shop business and franchise | Peter Jones | Failed (Note: Tuk Tuk Chai rejected the investment after filming stating that they would opt for crowd funding instead. Remains active.) | | Active |
| Episode 2 | 19 August 2018 | Will Hodson and Henry De Zoete | Look After My Bills | 90,000 (Increased to 120,000 in negotiation) | 3 | Energy services comparison website offering details for energy services. | Jenny Campbell and Tej Lalvani | Signed | | Sold (2019) |
| Episode 3 | 26 August 2018 | Anna and William Brightman | Optiat (renamed UpCircle) | 50,000 | 30 | Sustainable skincare products. | Tej Lalvani and Touker Suleyman | Failed (Note: Optiat declined the investment after filming, having raised £217,500 for 9.81% equity via Crowdcube. Remains active.) | | Active |
| Episode 3 | 26 August 2018 | Brian Smillie and Euan McCreath | Beezer | 125,000 | 15 (10% once investment is repaid.) | App generator platform. | Peter Jones | Failed (Note: Beezer's investment did not complete. Smillie and McCreath have since stated they would still consider Jones as an investor should negotiations re-open. Remains active.) | | Active |
| Episode 4 | 2 September 2018 | Leila Rose Faddoul | Kameleon Rose | 50,000 | 40 | Travel clothing offering 20 outfits in one travel dress″ | Deborah Meaden | Failed (Note: Kameleon Rose's investment was not completed. Deborah Meaden withdrew from the deal 4 months before the episode's broadcast. Company announced its closure in July 2021 citing the coronavirus pandemic as having severely affected the business.) | | Dissolved (2022) |
| Episode 4 | 2 September 2018 | Rob Forgione & Denis Kovalyov | Infuse My. Colour | 80,000 | 25 | Natural vegetable dye colour wash shampoo. | Tej Lalvani | Signed | | Liquidation (2023) |
| Episode 5 | 9 September 2018 | Mark Boyt | Drone and Safe Register | 60,000 | 40 | Drone camera hire | Peter Jones | Signed | | Active |
| Episode 5 | 9 September 2018 | Liz Beswick and Camilla Brown | Young in Spirit | 50,000 | 30 | Alcoholic drink specialising in Gin. | Tej Lalvani and Touker Suleyman | Signed | | Dissolved (2022) |
| Episode 6 | 16 September 2018 | Peter Hill | Pedaldish (renamed Petvictus) | 30,000 | 33 | Pedal-activated bowl designed to freshen cat food. | Deborah Meaden | Failed (Note: Petvictus's investment does not appear to have been completed. There is no record of Deborah Meaden being listed as a director or shareholder. Remains active.) | | Active |
| Episode 6 | 16 September 2018 | Cecily Mills | Coconuts Naturally (Coconuts Organic) | 75,000 | 30 / 40 | Organic Dairy Free Ice Cream | Jenny Campbell | Failed (Note: Coconuts Naturally declined Campbell's investment following filming, deciding instead to raise funds through crowdfunding. Company was dissolved in August 2023.) | | Dissolved (2023) |
| Episode 6 | 16 September 2018 | Craig Hill | Landscapes 4 Learning | 50,000 | 30 | Outdoor learning equipment | Peter Jones | Signed | | Active |
| Episode 7 | 4 November 2018 | Steven Ransom | Brighter Bikes | 90,000 | 25 | Indicator lights for bicycles | Deborah Meaden and Peter Jones | Failed (Note: Brighter Bikes investment did not complete. Tiger Mobiles stated that Ransom completed due diligence, however he suspected the dragons felt the investment undervalued the company and had unrealistic expectations for the product's release date. Remains active.) | | Active |
| Episode 7 | 4 November 2018 | James Holmes | Mark Mate | 20,000 | 35 (30% once investment is repaid.) | App platform designed to aid teachers mark and assess students' work | Touker Suleyman | Failed (Note: Mark Mate's investment did not complete. James Holmes claimed to have received substantial advice and mentoring from Touker Suleyman, but decided to continue without investment citing the product's growth from the time of the episode's broadcast. Remains active.) | | Active |
| Episode 8 | 11 November 2018 | Robert Sak | The Heart of Nature | 40,000 | 20 | Wheat and gluten-free whole grains, seeds and fruits, suitable for vegans. | Deborah Meaden | Failed (Note: The Heart of Nature's investment does not appear to have been completed. There is no record of Deborah Meaden being listed as a director or shareholder. Remains active.) | | Active |
| Episode 8 | 11 November 2018 | Patrick Ambron and Nathan Evans | BrandYourself | 100,000 | 2.5 | Online reputation management company | Peter Jones | Failed (Note: BrandYourself's investment does not appear to have been completed. Tiger mobiles have suggested the company was already securely funded by American investors. Dissolved by 2023 in UK but remains active in USA.) | | Dissolved (2023) |
| Episode 9 | 25 November 2018 | Laurence Beeke | Platinum Pie LTD (renamed TubFix) | 50,000 | 33 | Bathroom construction service | Deborah Meaden | Failed (Note: Platinum Pie's investment does not appear to have been completed. There is no record of Deborah Meaden being listed as a director or shareholder. Company was sold in 2021 and has since been rebranded as Tubfix.) | | Sold (2021) |
| Episode 9 | 25 November 2018 | Andy Murray | The Drinks Bakery | 50,000 | 25 | Snacks box containing selections of alcoholic drinks and biscuits. | Deborah Meaden and Peter Jones | Signed | | Active |
| Episode 10 | 2 December 2018 | James Heaton and Alex Beckett | Elite Competitions | 50,000 | 25 | Gambling competition service offering user chosen prizes as rewards. | Tej Lalvani and Touker Suleyman | Failed (Note: Elite Competitions' investment did not complete. It is believed the dragons had concerns over gambling addictions which led to the investment being withdrawn. Remains active.) | | Active |
| Episode 10 | 2 December 2018 | Katie Mullally | Katie Mullally Jewellery | 70,000 | 40 | Hallmarked jewellery combining vintage pieces with modern bespoke design with links to Irish heritage. | Deborah Meaden | Failed (Note: Katie Mullally Jewellery's investment does not appear to have been completed. There is no record of Deborah Meaden being listed as a director or shareholder. Remains active.) | | Active |
| Episode 11 | 23 December 2018 | Steven Holmes | Soccer Star | 60,000 | 25 | Personalised football comic books | Peter Jones | Unclear (Note: Soccer Star's investment status remains unclear. Company has promoted its appearance on Dragon's Den as successful, however there is no record of Peter Jones being listed as a shareholder or director. Company dissolved by 2023.) | | Dissolved (2023) |
| Episode 11 | 23 December 2018 | James Cadbury | Love Cocoa | 75,000 | 20 (15% once investment is repaid.) | Chocolate boxes founded by descendant of John Cadbury | Tej Lalvani | Failed (Note: Love Cocoa's investment was never completed. James Cadbury stated he was unable to come to terms with Tej Lalvani after several meetings. Remains active.) | | Active |
| Episode 12 | 6 January 2019 | Louis d'Origny | OHMME | 80,000 | 20 | Men's yoga clothing made from recycled materials | Peter Jones | Failed (Note: Ohmme's investment was not completed, believed to have broken down during due diligence. Remains active.) | | Dissolved (2022) |
| Episode 13 | 13 January 2019 | Robert Milder | Van de Sant | 70,000 | 15 | Sustainable furniture made from ocean bound plastics | Deborah Meaden | Failed (Note: Van de Sant's investment does not appear to have been completed. There is no record of Deborah Meaden being listed as a director or shareholder. Remains active in Holland.) | | Active |
| Episode 13 | 13 January 2019 | Liam Manton and Mark Smallwood | Didsbury Gin | 75,000 | 33.3 | Gin based alcoholic beverages | Jenny Campbell | Signed | | Liquidation (2024) |
| Episode 14 | 27 January 2019 | Sian Ellingworth | Buddies | 60,000 | 44 | Electric toothbrush for children, inserting toothpaste cartridges to ensure the correct amount. | Tej Lalvani and Touker Suleyman | Failed (Note: Buddies' investment did not complete. Sian Ellingworth stated she had various meetings with the dragons before they decided to withdraw their offer without apparent reason. Remains active.) | | Active |
| Episode 14 | 27 January 2019 | Andy Dixon and John-Paul Gardner | Oatein Ltd | 50,000 | 25 (20% if investment is repaid within one year.) | Range of low sugar, high protein snacks | Peter Jones | Signed | | Dissolved (2025) |
| Episode 15 | 3 February 2019 | Christopher Reed | ParkingPerx | 80,000 | 45 | Loyalty app that offers discounted parking fees and cashless payment for parking | Jenny Campbell | Signed | | Dissolved (2024) |

=== Series 17 ===
| Episode | First aired | Entrepreneur(s) | Company or product name | Money requested (£) | Equity Given % | Description of product | Investing Dragon(s) | Result After Filming | Website | Fate |
|---|---|---|---|---|---|---|---|---|---|---|
| Episode 1 | 11 August 2019 | Tom Keen | Flush Brush | 50,000 | 33 | Alternative Toilet Cleaner | Sara Davies | Failed (Note: Flush Brush's investment did not complete. Tom Keen started following filming that he had opted to look for crowdfunding instead. Dissolved by 2024.) | | Dissolved (2024) |
| Episode 1 | 11 August 2019 | Katy Foxcroft and Gillian Robson | Tancream | 75,000 | 25 (Investment split at 12.5% per Dragon.) | Sun Block and Moisturiser | Touker Suleyman and Sara Davies | Signed | | Active |
| Episode 2 | 18 August 2019 | Jacqueline Barleycorn and Matt Hunt | The Great British Porridge Company | 60,000 | 22 | Porridge | Tej Lalvani | Failed (Note: The Great British Porridge Company rejected the investment after filming, stating after various discussions with Tej Lalvani they felt the offer was too 'restrictive.' The company remains active.) | | Active |
| Episode 2 | 18 August 2019 | Sean McGarry | The ShowerGem | 100,000 | 24 | Rust Proof Shower Organiser | Tej Lalvani, Sara Davies and Touker Suleyman | Failed (Note: The Showergem's investment does not appear to have been completed. Company was dissolved in 2020.) | | Dissolved (2020) |
| Episode 2 | 18 August 2019 | Oliver Adkins and Ruth Nicholls | Churchill Gowns | 60,000 | 22 | Graduation gown rentals | Deborah Meaden | Failed (Note: Churchill Gowns investment does not appear to have been completed. Ruth Nicholls stated in September 2020 that the deal was still not finalised, stating the due diligence process was still on-going. As of 2022, Deborah Meaden is not listed as a shareholder, nor has she taken on a directorship.) | | Active |
| Episode 3 | 25 August 2019 | Hanna Sillitoe | Hannasillitoe skin care products | 50,000 | 20 | Skin Care Product | Tej Lalvani and Peter Jones | Signed | | Active |
| Episode 3 | 25 August 2019 | Will Chew | Mak Tok | 60,000 | 33 | Mak Tok Chilli paste | Sara Davies | Signed | | Active |
| Episode 4 | 1 September 2019 | Ben Smith | Fine Diet App | 70,000 | 25 | Mobile Dieting app | Theo Paphitis (Note: Theo Paphtitis standing in for Touker Suleyman.) | Unclear (Note: Fine Diet's investment status remains unclear. Company promotes the pitch as successful, however there is no indication of Theo Paphitis being listed as a shareholder or a director. Remains active.) | | Active |
| Episode 4 | 1 September 2019 | Wayne Taylor | Rehook | 50,000 | 25 | Bicycle tool | Deborah Meaden | Signed | | Active |
| Episode 5 | 8 September 2019 | Teirnan Mccorkell | Pipe Easy | 41,000 | 30 | Pipe Fitting tool | Sara Davies | Signed | | Active |
| Episode 5 | 8 September 2019 | Daniel Gray | War Paint | 70,000 | 12 | Make up for men | Peter Jones and Tej Lalvani | Failed (Note: War Paint declined the investment after filming. Daniel Gray stated that he would progress the business further before accepting financial investment. Remains active.) | | Active |
| Episode 6 | 15 September 2019 | Richard Brook | Sockitz | 100,000 | 40 (Equity reduces to 20% each when investment is paid back.) | Electrical protection shields | Deborah Meaden and Theo Paphitis | Failed (Note: Sockitz's investment does not appear to have been completed. Deborah Meaden nor Theo Paphitis have been listed as shareholders or directors. Remains active.) | | Active |
| Episode 7 | 22 September 2019 | Stephen Conway | Pure Heavenly Limited | 75,000 | 20 (Reduces to 15% if dragon receives £100,000 within 18 months.) | Reduced Sugar Vegan and Gluten Free Chocolate | Peter Jones | Failed (Note: Pure Heavenly rejected the investment after completing due diligence, stating their discomfort at signing certain clauses. Dissolved by 2024.) | | Dissolved (2024) |
| Episode 8 | 22 December 2019 | Matt, Will, and Ed | Dinoski | 50,000 | 12.5 | Animal Themed Ski Suits | Peter Jones | Failed (Note: Dinoski declined investment after filming, stating they had raised six times the amount they pitched for via crowdfunding. Remains active.) | | Active |
| Episode 8 | 22 December 2019 | Claudia Negoescu & Alexandru Ianas | Imperial Candles | 100,000 | 40 | Jewelry Bath Bombs and Candles | Tej Lalvani and Touker Suleyman | Failed (Note: Imperial Candles' investment does not appear to have been completed. Company was dissolved in 2020.) | | Dissolved (2020) |
| Episode 9 | 8 March 2020 | Richard Clark and Paul Briscoe | Drynks Unlimited | 125,000 | 7.5 | Alcohol-free Drinks | Sara Davies | Signed | | Dissolved (2024) |
| Episode 9 | 8 March 2020 | Von Sy | Nimble | 85,000 | 45 (Reduces to 39% if investment is returned within 12 months.) | Plant-based Baby Products | Tej Lalvani, Touker Suleyman, and Sara Davies | Failed | | Liquidated (2023) |
| Episode 10 | 15 March 2020 | Rutger Bruining and Theo Brainin | StoryTerrace | 90,000 | 5 | Personal Biographer | Tej Lalvani | Failed (Note: StoryTerrace rejected the investment after filming. They since stated they raised more money from alternative sources after filming. Company in administration as of 2023.) | | In administration (2023) |
| Episode 10 | 15 March 2020 | David and Julie Gray | Viper Clip | 80,000 | 25 | Fully Insulated Cable Staple | Deborah Meaden | Signed | | Active |
| Episode 11 | 22 March 2020 | Jess and Philip | Brain Fud Drinks | 50,000 | 30 | Natural Energy Drinks | Peter Jones | Failed (Note: Brain Fud Drinks rejected the investment after filming, stating they preferred to raise funds through crowdfunding. Remains active.) | | Active |
| Episode 11 | 22 March 2020 | Ross Lamond | Bug Bakes | 50,000 | 50 (35% if investment is returned in 12 months.) | Insect Protein Dog Food | Touker Suleyman | Failed (Note: Bug Bakes' investment did not complete. Ross Lamond stated following further discussions with Touker Suleyman he decided to continue without his investment, citing differences in visions for the ecological aspects of the business. Remains active.) | | Active |
| Episode 12 | 29 March 2020 | Eric and Hugo Bohring | Lemuro | 75,000 | 25 | Phone Camera Lenses | Deborah Meaden | Failed (Note: Lemuro's investment was not completed. Company was dissolved by 2020.) | | Dissolved (2020) |
| Episode 12 | 29 March 2020 | George Hintzen | TOAD.ai | 100,000 | 10 | Outdoor Advertising Software | Tej Lalvani | Unclear (Note: Toad AI's investment status remains unclear. Company has stated their pitch was successful, however there is no record of Tej Lalvani being listed as a director or shareholder. Remains active.) | | Active |
| Episode 13 | 5 April 2020 | Mike Shore | Eco For Life | 50,000 | 33 | Bottles made from corn plants as opposed to plastic | Touker Suleyman and Tej Lalvani | Unclear (Note: Eco For Life's investment status remains unclear. Company's pitch appeared successful, however Lalvani nor Suleyman have been listed as shareholders or directors. Remains active.) | | Active |
| Episode 13 | 5 April 2020 | Phillip and Lakshmy Pengelly | Fliptop | 10,000 | 25 | Chair table designed for care homes | Sara Davies | Signed | | Active |
| Episode 14 | 12 April 2020 | Joe Metcalfe | Thrift+ | 150,000 | 10 | Online sales of used clothes | Sara Davies | Unclear (Note: Thrift +'s investment status remains unclear. Company's pitch appeared successful, however Davies has not been listed as a shareholder or director. In administration as of 2025.) | | In administration (2025) |

=== Series 18 ===
| Episode | First aired | Entrepreneur(s) | Company or product name | Money requested (£) | Equity Given % | Description of product | Investing Dragon(s) | Result After Filming | Website | Fate |
|---|---|---|---|---|---|---|---|---|---|---|
| Episode 1 | 1 April 2021 | Dmitry Klochkov and Jeong Cheol BAE | Offblak | 70,000 | 10 (7.5% as soon as investment is repaid) | Flavoured tea delivery service | Peter Jones | Signed | | Active |
| Episode 1 | 1 April 2021 | Zena El Farra | Masterpeace | 50,000 | 25 | Mindful art classes and painting kits | Deborah Meaden | Signed | | Dissolved (2022) |
| Episode 1 | 1 April 2021 | Antonia Philp and Jonny Philp | Nursem | 75,000 | 5 (3% as soon as investment is repaid) | Skincare product for hands | Tej Lalvani | Signed | | Active |
| Episode 2 | 8 April 2021 | Sean Ali and Charlotte Bailey | Super U | 50,000 | 6 | Organic foods supplier | Tej Lalvani and Peter Jones | Failed (Note: Super U declined the investment after filming, opting to raise funds through crowdfunding. Remains active.) | | Active |
| Episode 2 | 8 April 2021 | Kameese Davis | Nylah's Naturals | 50,000 | 40 (30% if investment is repaid within 18 months) | Eco-based hair-care products for afro and curly hair | Sara Davies | Failed (Note: Nylah's Naturals declined the investment after filming as the terms of the contract could not be agreed. Remains active.) | | Active |
| Episode 3 | 15 April 2021 | Emma Thornton | True Skincare Ltd | 75,000 | 12.5 | Waterless skincare products | Deborah Meaden | Failed (Note: True Skincare declined investment after filming, deciding to continue with new brand developments without investment. Company in liquidation of as 2024.) | | Liquidation (2024) |
| Episode 3 | 15 April 2021 | Dom Hogan | Opie's Emporium | 50,000 | 35 (20% if investment is repaid within 18 months) | "All natural" pet treats for dogs | Touker Suleyman | Failed (Note: Opie's Emporium stated: "After filming and during further discussions, we decided the investment wasn't right for us at the time. Company in liquidation as of 2025.") | | Liquidation (2025) |
| Episode 4 | 22 April 2021 | Noel Marshall | MuscleBallers Ltd | 100,000 | 25 (10% if investment is repaid within 12 months) | BackBaller foam roller device | Sara Davies | Unclear (Note: Muscle Ballers investment status remains unclear. Company has indicated Sara Davies invested in the company, however there is no record of her being listed as a shareholder or director. Remains active.) | | Active |
| Episode 4 | 22 April 2021 | Julie Hawkins and Nancy Gries | Coti Vision | 50,000 | 20 | Interchangeable chains for reading glasses | Deborah Meaden | Signed | | Active |
| Episode 4 | 22 April 2021 | Sam Jones | Gener8 | 60,000 | 10 | Online vouchers in response to data received by advertisers | Peter Jones and Touker Suleyman | Signed | | Active |
| Episode 5 | 29 April 2021 | Sharon Keegan | Peachy Lean | 100,000 | 30 | Spandex and nylon gym wear for women | Touker Suleyman, Sara Davies and Tej Lalvani | Signed | | Active |
| Episode 5 | 29 April 2021 | James and Abi Morris | Compare Ethics | 70,000 | 10 | Ethical clothing verification platform | Peter Jones and Deborah Meaden | Signed | | Active |
| Episode 6 | 6 May 2021 | Jeremy Poland | NGX | 50,000 | 15 | Genetically personalised meal shake | Peter Jones and Touker Suleyman | Failed | | Active |
| Episode 6 | 6 May 2021 | Dave Murphy | Trapped in the Web | 30,000 | 10 | Online escape room gaming service | Sara Davies | Signed | | Active |
| Episode 6 | 6 May 2021 | Eileen Hutchinson | Nit Not | 40,000 | 30 | Hair comb for nits and head lice | Tej Lalvani | Signed | | Active |
| Episode 7 | 13 May 2021 | Carina Cunha | Be Nosy Ltd | 50,000 | 15 | Breathing device protecting against air pollution | Tej Lalvani | Unclear (Note: Be Nosy's investment status remains unclear. Cunha has stated her pitch was successful, however there is no record of Lalvani being listed as a shareholder or director. Dissolved by 2024) | | Dissolved (2024) |
| Episode 7 | 13 May 2021 | Stephanie Kelsey | Beach Powder Ltd | 60,000 | 49 | Plant and mineral based powder which removes sand from skin | Sara Davies and Touker Suleyman | Signed | | Active |
| Episode 7 | 13 May 2021 | Thomas Aske and Tristan Stephenson | WhiskyMe | 75,000 | 15 | Whisky subscription service. | Deborah Meaden, Tej Lalvani and Peter Jones | Signed | | Active |
| Episode 8 | 20 May 2021 | Siddhi Mittal and Heinin Zhang | yhangry | 100,000 | 10 | Private chef hire | Peter Jones and Tej Lalvani | Failed (Note: YHangry stated that: "we chose to walk away from the deal in private and instead raised £1.1m in funding from a round of angel investors.") | | Active |
| Episode 8 | 20 May 2021 | Tim Wilday and James Colhurst | Willsow Ltd | 20,000 | 15 | Plantable books pages made from seeds | Sara Davies | Signed | | Active |
| Episode 8 | 20 May 2021 | Drew Cockton | Owen Drew | 50,000 | 30 (25% if investment is repaid within 18 months) | Vegan soy wax candles, eau de parfum fragrances and shampoo collections | Touker Suleyman | Signed (Note: Company continues to trade following Drew's death in 2022. Touker Suleyman remains as co-director. Company in liquidation as of 2024.) | | Liquidation (2024) |
| Episode 9 | 27 May 2021 | Jack Nyber | Puresweet | 75,000 | 10 | Sugar free alternatives | Peter Jones and Tej Lalvani | Signed | | Dissolved (2024) |
| Episode 9 | 27 May 2021 | Helen Davies | Easy Tots | 80,000 | 30 | Food trays for babies and infants | Sara Davies | Signed | | In administration (2024) |
| Episode 9 | 27 May 2021 | Tim Keaveney and Matt Aubrey | Home Things | 50,000 | 5 (Note: 2 of the 5% was for the investment of £50,000 and 3 of the 5% were advisory shares.) | Cleaning tablets used to reduce waste of plastic bottles | Peter Jones and Deborah Meaden | Signed | | Active |
| Episode 10 | 3 June 2021 | James and Aileen McCauley | The Wriggler | 50,000 | 40 (Note: Touker Suleyman's declined proposal of £50,000 for 90% equity of The Wriggler remains the second highest amount of equity ever requested by a dragon.) | Anti-roll changing mat for babies and infants | Sara Davies | Failed (Note: The Wriggler's investment was not completed. Company stated in August 2021 that the deal was still not signed and were open to offers from other investors.) | | Active |
| Episode 11 | 10 June 2021 | Thomas Hurst | Rockstar Spirits | 25,000 | 8 | Premium spiced rums | Touker Suleyman and Tej Lalvani | Signed | | Liquidation (2024) |
| Episode 11 | 10 June 2021 | Yanika Cordina | Cordina Hair | 75,000 | 50 | Heatless hair curling device | Sara Davies | Signed | | Active |
| Episode 12 | 24 June 2021 | Gaynor Saunders | It's All About Shoes | 50,000 | 45 | Recyclable shoe straps | Touker Suleyman | Failed (Note: Gaynor stated that her investment did not complete after filming. Company was sold in 2024.) | | Sold (2024) |
| Episode 12 | 24 June 2021 | Kate and Matt Ball | Mini First Aid | 50,000 | 20 (10% if investment is repaid within 18 months) | First aid training kit for children | Sara Davies | Signed | | Active |
| Episode 13 | 1 July 2021 | Darren Lewitt Feisser | Nobu Pet | 50,000 | 35 (30% if investment is repaid within 18 months) | Pet waste collecting device | Touker Suleyman | Signed | | Active |
| Episode 13 | 1 July 2021 | Assad Hamir and Dhruvin Patel | Ocushield | 75,000 | 15 | Blue light filtering product for mobile phones | Peter Jones and Tej Lalvani | Signed | | Active |
| Episode 13 | 1 July 2021 | Rachel Kettlewell | Fearne and Rosie | 40,000 | 35 (30% if investment is repaid within 18 months) | Reduced sugar jams | Tej Lalvani | Failed (Note: Fearne and Rosie declined Tej Lalvani's investment after filming, deciding instead to partner with another investor. Remains active.) | | Active |
| Episode 14 | 8 July 2021 | Siobhan Miller | Positive Birth | 136,000 | 10 (6% if investment is repaid within 18 months) | Hypnobirthing mobile app | Tej Lalvani and Touker Suleyman | Signed | | Active |
| Episode 14 | 8 July 2021 | Gary Giles and Alan Watts | Ogel | 50,000 | 10 | Recyclable building materials for outdoor buildings | Sara Davies and Tej Lalvani | Signed | | Active |
| Episode 14 | 8 July 2021 | Kirstie McClaren and Katie Bell | The Workbench London | 50,000 | 45 (30% when investment is repaid) | Custom designed jewellery service | Sara Davies | Signed | | Dissolved (2022) |

=== Series 19 ===
| Episode | First aired | Entrepreneur(s) | Company or product name | Money requested (£) | Equity Given % | Description of product | Investing Dragon(s) | Result After Filming | Website | Fate |
|---|---|---|---|---|---|---|---|---|---|---|
| Episode 1 | 6 January 2022 | Richard Hancock and Edward Simpson | Cheesegeek | 150,000 | 7.5 (5% if investment is repaid with 24months) | Cheese subscribing mobile app | Steven Bartlett | Signed | | In administration (2025) |
| Episode 1 | 6 January 2022 | Dr. Chang Liu | Extend Robotics | 150,000 | 25 | Human controlled robot via VR for hospitality | Peter Jones | Unclear (Note: Extend Robotics' investment status remains unclear. There is no record of Jones being listed as a shareholder or director.) | | Active |
| Episode 2 | 13 January 2022 | Joel and Nicky Buckley | Eco Union | 85,000 | 20 | Carbon-neutral paint roller preventing mixing of colours | Deborah Meaden | Failed (Note: Eco Union's investment does not appear to have been completed. Joel and Nicky Buckley retired their positions as company directors 3 months before the episode's broadcast. Remains active.) | | Active |
| Episode 2 | 13 January 2022 | Victoria Fullarton | The Toto Sleep Company | 150,000 | 35 | Bio-metric sleeping aid for infants | Sara Davies | Unclear (Note: The Toto Sleep Company's investment status remains unclear. Fullarton has indicated her pitch was successful, however there is no record of Davies being listed as a shareholder or director.) | | Active |
| Episode 2 | 13 January 2022 | Rebecca Sloan | Piddle Patch | 50,000 | 30 (20% if/when targets are hit) | Soil-free real grass dog toilet | Steven Bartlett | Unclear (Note: Piddle Patch's investment status remains unclear. There is no record of Bartlett being listed as a shareholder or director.) | | Active |
| Episode 3 | 20 January 2022 | Rebecca Joy and Natalie Diana | Frida Rome | 50,000 | 20 | Vegan non-leather handbags with erotic stories included | Steven Bartlett | Unclear (Note: Frida Rome's investment status remains unclear. There is no record of Bartlett being listed as a shareholder or director.) | | Active |
| Episode 3 | 20 January 2022 | Andrew and Karen Turner | Kandy Kitchen Creations Ltd | 50,000 | 33 | Ingredients packages for soups, rissotos, stews and desserts | Peter Jones, Deborah Meaden and Touker Suleyman | Unclear (Note: Kandy Kitchen's investment status remains unclear. There is no record of Jones, Meaden or Suleyman being listed as shareholders or directors.) | | Active |
| Episode 4 | 27 January 2022 | Rob Angel and Debbie Greeves | Barking Bags | 35,000 | 25 | Portable bag for storing goods for dogs | Sara Davies | Failed (Note: Barking Bag's investment was not completed, they stated: "Sara and her team were supportive but the partners eventually came to a mutual understanding not to proceed with the offer of investment".) | | Active |
| Episode 4 | 27 January 2022 | Charlotte Morley | The Little Loop | 75,000 (received 140,000) | 25 | Clothes swapping monthly-subscription website | Deborah Meaden and Steven Bartlett | Signed (Note: Charlotte Morley was the first entrepreneur to negotiate double the financial investment originally pitched for.) | | Active |
| Episode 5 | 4 February 2022 | Chris and Michael Knell | Escape Kent Ltd | 100,000 | 25 (20% if investment is repaid within 24 months) | Escape room adventure course | Peter Jones and Sara Davies | Unclear (Note: Escape Kent's investment status remains unclear. The investment was reported as having been received, however there is no record of Davies nor Jones being listed as shareholders or directors.) | | Active |
| Episode 5 | 4 February 2022 | Natalie Quail | Smile Time | 50,000 | 20 | Teeth whitening oral cosmetics | Touker Suleyman and Steven Bartlett | Unclear (Note: Smile Time's investment status remains unclear. The investment was reported as having been received, however there is no record of Bartlett nor Suleyman being listed as a shareholders or directors.) | | Active |
| Episode 6 | 10 February 2022 | Sofie Hepworth | Little Hoppa by Sophie | 75,000 (received £100,000) | 45 | Eco friendly baby-cot | Touker Suleyman | Signed | | Active |
| Episode 6 | 10 February 2022 | Shehzaad Shaikh and Zain Peir | London Nootropics | 50,000 | 30 (25% if investment is repaid within 18 months) | Coffee blends with natural nootropic | Deborah Meaden and Sara Davies | Unclear (Note: London Nootropics's investment status remains unclear. The investment was reported as having been received, however there is no record of Davies nor Meaden being listed as shareholders or directors.) | | Active |
| Episode 7 | 17 February 2022 | Annie Mitchell | Bottle Shot Brew | 80,000 | 10 (5% if investment is repaid within 12 months) | Canned cold coffee beverages | Peter Jones | Unclear (Note: Bottle Shot Brew's investment status remains unclear. The investment was reported as having been received, however there is no record of Jones being listed as a shareholder or director.) | | Sold (2023) |
| Episode 7 | 17 February 2022 | Steven Murr | Turbo Rocks | 80,000 | 40 | Indoor cycling device | Sara Davies and Touker Suleyman | Unclear (Note: Turbo Rocks' investment status remains unclear. The investment was indicated as having been received, however there is no record of Davies nor Suleyman being listed as shareholders or directors.) | | Active |
| Episode 7 | 17 February 2022 | Matthew Crate and Melody Truong | Toucan Giving | 85,000 | 10 | App donating to charities | Steven Bartlett (Note: Toucan Giving were the first entrepreneurs to decline having all five dragons invest together. The pitch was only the third instance in the show's history that such an offer was proposed.) | Failed (Note: Toucan Giving's investment does not appear to have been completed. Company entered voluntary liquidation in 2022.) | | Liquidation (2023) |
| Episode 8 | 25 February 2022 | Edward Fisher and Matthew Kennedy | Get Fussy | 50,000 | 5 | Refillable deodrant | Deborah Meaden and Peter Jones | Signed | | Active |
| Episode 9 | 3 March 2022 | Paul Westerman | RBR Legflow | 50,000 | 35 | Device preventing deep vein thrombosis | Touker Suleyman | Unclear (Note: RBR Legflow's investment status remains unclear. The investment was indicated as having been received, however there is no record of Suleyman being listed as a shareholder or director.) | | Active |
| Episode 9 | 3 March 2022 | Hannah Saunders | Toddle | 60,000 | 13 (10% if this year's targets are hit) | Vegan gentle skincare for children | Deborah Meaden and Steven Bartlett | Signed | | Active |
| Episode 10 | 10 March 2022 | Daniel Wiseman and Joseph Mills | The Detective Society | 75,000 | 25 | Mystery puzzle games | Deborah Meaden and Sara Davies | Unclear (Note: The Detective Society's investment status remains unclear. The investment was indicated as having been received, however there is no record of Davies nor Meaden being listed as shareholders or directors.) | | Active |
| Episode 10 | 10 March 2022 | Giles Atwell and Steve Russell | Russell and Atwell Fresh Chocolatiers | 90,000 | 20 | Sustainable chocolate selection with cocoa, organic honey, Dorset sea salt, and organic cream | Peter Jones and Steven Bartlett | Unclear (Note: Russell and Atwell Fresh Chocolatiers' investment status remains unclear. The investment was indicated as having been received, however there is no record of Bartlett nor Jones being listed as shareholders or directors.) | | Active |
| Episode 11 | 17 March 2022 | Josh Cummins and Lee Hoppen | Let's Sanitise | 80,000 | 25 (20% when the investment is repaid) | Selection of vegan scented hand-sanitising gels | Peter Jones and Touker Suleyman | Unclear (Note: Let's Sanitise's investment status remains unclear. The investment was indicated as having been received, however there is no record of Jones nor Suleyman being listed as shareholders or directors.) | | Active |
| Episode 12 | 24 March 2022 | Paul Crawford | Panther Milk | 50,000 | 25 | Plant based milk cocktails | Deborah Meaden | Failed (Note: Panther Milk withdrew during due diligence following Meaden's advice that he was better suited not to accept her investment. Remains active.) | | Active |
| Episode 12 | 24 March 2022 | Ian Worton and Peter Neath | Sauce Stream Ltd | 75,000 | 33 | Squeeze bottles made from glass | Peter Jones, Steven Bartlett and Deborah Meaden | Failed (Note: Sauce Stream were the first entrepreneurs to gain investment having appeared twice on show. They however announced that they declined investment following filming. Remains active.) | | Active |
| Episode 13 | 31 March 2022 | Alex and Jenny McFadden | Pretty Mama Breastfeeding | 30,000 | 33 | Easy access maternity wear | Peter Jones, Steven Bartlett, Touker Suleyman and Sara Davies | Unclear (Note: Pretty Mama Breastfeeding's investment status remains unclear. The investment was indicated as having been received, however there is no record of any dragons being listed as shareholders or directors.) | | Active |
| Episode 13 | 31 March 2022 | Christopher Burdett and Alex Lever | Pipe snug | 100,000 | 30 | Pipe sealing aid | Peter Jones and Deborah Meaden | Unclear (Note: Pipe snug's investment status remains unclear. The investment was indicated as having been received, however there is no record of Jones nor Meaden being listed as shareholders or directors.) | | Active |
| Episode 14 | 7 April 2022 | David Hellard | Caffeine Bullet | 60,000 | 25 (20% if the investment is repaid within 24 months.) | Caffeine energy chews | Peter Jones and Steven Bartlett | Signed | | Active |
| Episode 14 | 7 April 2022 | Matt Jones | Mesoa for Men | 66,000 | 35 | Skin and hair care range for men | Touker Suleyman | Failed (Note: Mesoa declined Suleyman's investment after filming, with Jones citing "the structure of the deal, processes, and control provisions" as problematic. Remains active.) | | Active |
| Episode 14 | 7 April 2022 | Natalie Duvall and Alison Burton | March Muses | 50,000 | 30 | Ethnically diverse Christmas decorations | Peter Jones and Deborah Meaden | Signed | | Active |
| Not Broadcast (Note: {{See Clarity of investments and treatment of entrepreneurs}}) | N/A | Howard Brown and Alex Black | Real Infra Red Ltd | 85,000 | N/A | Underfloor heating system | Touker Suleyman | Failed (Note: Real Infra Red declined the offer of investment following filming due to their discomfort with Suleyman's insistence on a builder for a major construction firm to also participate in the investment. Remains active.) | | Active |

=== Series 20 ===
| Episode | First aired | Entrepreneur(s) | Company or product name | Money requested (£) | Equity Given % | Description of product | Investing Dragon(s) | Result After Filming | Website | Fate |
|---|---|---|---|---|---|---|---|---|---|---|
| Episode 1 | 5 January 2023 | Lucy Rout | Tabuu | 50,000 | 40 | Portable case for medication tablets | Sara Davies, Peter Jones and Touker Suleyman | Failed (Note: Tabuu declined the investment after filming, stating that after accepting Jones' condition of working for him as well as running the company, she found working two roles as unsustainable and chose to run the company herself. Remains active.) | | Active |
| Episode 1 | 5 January 2023 | Raphael Babalola and Adam Hutchinson | Temple Wellness | 50,000 | 10 | Skincare products for men with dark skin | Steven Bartlett | Unclear (Note: Temple Wellness's investment status remains unclear. There is no record of Bartlett being listed as a shareholder or director. The company was issued 2 compulsory strike-off notices before being dissolved in June 2025.) | | Dissolved (2025) |
| Episode 1 | 5 January 2023 | Grace Frost and Jane Wallace | Psychic Sisters | 50,000 | 10 | Range of candles, cosmetics and aromatherapy | Sara Davies and Deborah Meaden | Signed (Note: Psychic Sister's investment was partially completed with Davies investing, but Meaden is not listed as a shareholder or director.) | | Active |
| Episode 2 | 12 January 2023 | Benjamin Pearson | Big Clothing 4 You | 150,000 | 35 | Large sized clothing for men | Touker Suleyman | Failed (Note: Big Clothing 4 U's financial position resulted in the company seeking voluntary liquidation months after the screening, before being wound up with unpaid debts of £4.4 million and dissolved in 2025.) | | Dissolved (2025) |
| Episode 2 | 12 January 2023 | Craig Smith | JustLend | 100,000 | 10 | Financial loan management for borrowing from family and friends. | Steven Bartlett | Unclear (Note: JustLend's investment status remains unclear. There is no record of Bartlett being listed as a shareholder or director, and the company sought equity funding elsewhere.) | | Active |
| Episode 3 | 19 January 2023 | Suzanne Haines, Astyn Demaine and Omar Mian | Potion Paris | 50,000 | 20 | Vegan and eco friendly perfumes | Steven Bartlett and Peter Jones | Unclear (Note: Potion Paris' investment status remains unclear. They have promoted their pitch as successful, however there is no record of Bartlett nor Jones being listed as a shareholders or directors. Remains active.) | | Active |
| Episode 3 | 19 January 2023 | Daniel Robson | Grow Sow Simple | 80,000 | 20 | Biodegradable pods for home-grown herbs and vegetables | Sara Davies | Unclear (Note: Grow Sow Simple's investment status remains unclear. There is no record of Davies being listed as a shareholder or director, and the company filed for voluntary liquidation 1 year after the episode screened.) | | Liquidation (2024) |
| Episode 4 | 26 January 2023 | Amelia Gammon | Bide Planet | 80,000 | 20 | Self manufactured eco-friendly cleaning products | Deborah Meaden | Failed (Note: Bide Planet's investment did not complete following filming. Though Gammon has since gained investments through angel investors, she has admitted her regret at appearing on the show, alleging a high number of orders placed following the broadcast subsequently caused production costs to soar faster than she had expected and left the company in financial difficulty. Dissolved by 2025.) | | Dissolved (2025) |
| Episode 4 | 26 January 2023 | David Hawcock | Pop Up Chess Set | 40,000 | 20 | Portable and foldable chess sets | Peter Jones and Touker Suleyman | Unclear (Note: David Hawcock reported in June 2023 that he is still in negotiations with Jones and Suleyman. Remains active.) | | Active |
| Episode 5 | 2 February 2023 | Max Thorley and Ashley Washington | Shocal | 80,000 | 30 (20% if investment is returned in 18 months) | Delivery app for local businesses | Touker Suleyman | Unclear (Note: Shocal's investment status remains unclear. They have indicated there pitch was successful, however there is no record of Suleyman being listed as a shareholder or director. Former dragon Theo Paphitis has however appeared in support of the company. Remains active.) | | Active |
| Episode 5 | 2 February 2023 | Myles Dickinson-Brown | Haze Cards | 35,000 | 35 | Custom metal credit and debit cards | Steven Bartlett | Failed (Note: The company was issued a compulsory strike-off notice 2 months after screening, and was dissolved 3 months later.) | | Dissolved (2023) |
| Episode 6 | 9 February 2023 | Peter and Chris Maxted | The Dog-G8 | 50,000 | 20 | Retractable and portable safety gates | Deborah Meaden | Unclear (Note: The Dog-G8's investment status remains unclear. There is no record of the Meaden being listed as a shareholder or director.) | | Active |
| Episode 6 | 9 February 2023 | Matthew Walker and Cristian Brownlee | Adapt Ability Omeo | 40,000 | 15 | Hands-free wheelchairs | Steven Bartlett, Sara Davies and Touker Suleyman | Unclear (Note: Adapt Ability Omeo's investment status remains unclear. There is no record of the dragons being listed as shareholders or directors. Remains active.) | | Active |
| Episode 7 | 16 February 2023 | Alex Brees | Un:hurd | 120,000 | 15 | App promoting independent music artists | Peter Jones and Deborah Meaden | Unclear (Note: Un:hurd's investment status remains unclear. There is no record of the dragons being listed as shareholders or directors. Remains active.) | | Active |
| Episode 7 | 16 February 2023 | Zoe Chapman | KiddiWhizz | 50,000 | 25 | Potty training aid for toddlers | Steven Bartlett and Sara Davies | Signed (Note: Bartlett and Davies' investment was finalised on the 2nd of November 2023. However, on the 20th of August 2025 both exited the business.) | | Active |
| Episode 8 | 23 February 2023 | James and Sally-Anne Coneron | Clear ‘n’ Collect | 50,000 | 25 (20% once investment is returned) | Multipurpose garden tool | Sara Davies | Unclear (Note: Clear ‘n’ Collect's investment status remains unclear. They have promoted their pitch as successful, however there is no record of Davies being listed as a shareholder or director.) | | Active |
| Episode 8 | 23 February 2023 | Hilary Kennedy and Will Moxham | Planthood | 75,000 | 7.5 | Subscription based vegan meal delivery | Steven Bartlett | Unclear (Note: Planthood's investment status remains unclear. They have promoted their pitch as successful, however there is no record of Bartlett being listed as a shareholder or director.) | | Active |
| Episode 9 | 2 March 2023 | Damien and Seb Harris | Bobhead | 50,000 | 30 | Motorcycle clothing and accessories | Peter Jones and Touker Suleyman | Unclear (Note: Bobhead's investment status remains unclear. There is no record of the dragons being listed as shareholders or directors. Remains active.) | | Active |
| Episode 9 | 2 March 2023 | Teddie Levenfiche and Marissa Poster | Perfect Ted | 50,000 | 10 | Organic, matcha-based energy drink | Steven Bartlett and Peter Jones | Signed (Note: It would appear that only Bartlett proceeded with the investment. Perfect Ted bought out Bartlett's shareholding in July 2025.) | | Active |
| Episode 10 | 9 March 2023 | Jason Gledhill | Redcote Leisure Ltd | 100,000 | 15 (10% if investment is returned in 18 months.) | Micro-campervans and accessories | Sara Davies (Sara Davies holds 10% whilst her father will hold 5%.) | Unclear (Note: Redcote Leisure's investment status remains unclear. They have promoted their pitch as successful, however there is no record of Davies being listed as a shareholder or director.) | | Active |
| Episode 10 | 9 March 2023 | Chris Lefteri and Forrest Radford | Fixits | 45,000 | 25 | Mouldable fixing sticks | Steven Bartlett | Unclear (Note: Fixits' investment status remains unclear. They have promoted their pitch as successful, however there is no record of Bartlett being listed as a shareholder or director. Remains active.) | | Active |
| Episode 10 | 9 March 2023 | Raj and Sheh Sharma | Football Billionaire | 50,000 | 20 | Monopoly based board game for football clubs, players and stadiums | Peter Jones | Failed (Note: Football Billionaire's investment did not complete after filming. Sheh Sharma, the youngest entrepreneur to have an offer accepted in the den as of 2023, alleged that his business was now worth £2.5 million following his episode's broadcast despite parting with Jones. Remains active.) | | Active |
| Episode 11 | 16 March 2023 | Alan Gillett | The XtraHand | 40,000 | 25 | Hands-free dust extraction tool | Peter Jones | Failed (Note: The Xtrahand rejected the investment after filming. Remains active.) | | Active |
| Episode 11 | 16 March 2023 | Richard and Fiona Jones | Beans Coffee Club | 50,000 | 15 | Coffee subscription club | Deborah Meaden and Steven Bartlett | Unclear (Note: Beans Coffee Club's investment status remains unclear. They have promoted their pitch as successful, however there is no record of the dragons being listed as a shareholders or directors. Remains active.) | | Active |
| Episode 11 | 16 March 2023 | Sanjay Lobo | onHand | 100,000 | 10 (6% upon investment being repaid.) | Community support app | Steven Bartlett, Peter Jones, Deborah Meaden and Touker Suleyman | Unclear (Note: onHand's investment status remains unclear. They have promoted their pitch as successful, however there is no record of the dragons being listed as a shareholders or directors. Remains active.) | | Active |
| Episode 12 | 23 March 2023 | Caroline Sims | Botanycl | 60,000 | 25 (20% if investment is repaid within 18 months.) | Plant-based supplement brand | Steven Bartlett and Peter Jones | Signed | | Active |
| Episode 12 | 23 March 2023 | Hamza Shah and Steve Victor | My Chocolate Shop | 40,000 | 30 | Personalised chocolate products | Sara Davies | Unclear (Note: My Chocolate Shop's investment status remains unclear. They have promoted their pitch as successful, however there is no record of Davies being listed as a shareholder or director.) | | Active |
| Episode 13 | 30 March 2023 | Helen and Mark Chapman | Bellybambino | 60,000 | 40 | Wicker baskets designed for children | Touker Suleyman | Failed (Note: Bellybambino's investment did not proceed, choosing to sell the whole business in October 2023 instead. Remains active under new ownership.) | | Active |
| Episode 14 | 6 April 2023 | Kelli Aspland and Laura Water | Solar Buddies | 80,000 | 20 | Suncream applicator for children | Peter Jones and Deborah Meaden | Signed | | Active |
| Episode 14 | 6 April 2023 | Karlee and Omar Ozener | Hello Klean | 100,000 | 10 (7.5% of equity and 2.5% in advisory shares.) | Showercare ecosystems reducing minerals and contaminants | Steven Bartlett | Unclear (Note: Hello Klean's investment status remains unclear. They have promoted their pitch as successful, however there is no record of Bartlett being listed as a shareholder or director. Remains active.) | | Active |
| Episode 14 | 6 April 2023 | Jo Proud | Mood Bears | 20,000 | 25 | Teddy bear brand | All five dragons | Signed (Note: Mood Bears was the first in the show's history to complete an all five dragon deal after filming.) | | Active |

== Rejected offers ==
=== Series 11 ===
| Episode | First aired | Entrepreneur(s) | Company or product name | Money offered (£) | Equity offered % | Description of product | Proposed Dragon(s) | Website | Fate |
|---|---|---|---|---|---|---|---|---|---|
| Episode 3 | 25 August 2013 | Tristan Williams, Ben Drummond and Dean Tempest | Linkee | 50,000 | 40 | Quiz style board game linking questions together to form the answer. | Duncan Bannatyne (Note: Linkee declined the offer of investment deeming the equity requested by the Bannatyne to be too high. Remains active.) | | Active |
| Episode 5 (Note: The fifth episode of Series 11 was the first episode in which no offers made by the dragons were accepted by any entrepreneurs.) | 8 September 2013 | Tim Morgan | Mountain Trike | 100,000 | 15 | Wheelchair designed for mountain hiking | Deborah Meaden (Note: Mountain Trike declined the offer of investment deeming the equity requested by Meaden to be too high. Remains active.) | | Active |
| Episode 10 | 16 February 2014 | Roger and Lesley Payne | Baavet | 130,000 | 50 | Woollen duvet and bed materials | Peter Jones and Duncan Bannatyne (Note: Baavet declined the offer of investment deeming the equity requested by the dragons to be too high. Remains active.) | | Active |

=== Series 12 ===
| Episode | First aired | Entrepreneur(s) | Company or product name | Money offered (£) | Equity offered % | Description of product | Proposed Dragon(s) | Website | Fate |
|---|---|---|---|---|---|---|---|---|---|
| Episode 1 | 20 July 2014 | Jake Hayman and Joe Kenyon | Frame Again | 60,000 | 100 | Picture framing website for smart phones | Peter Jones (Note: Frame Again declined the offer of investment as well as Jones' job offer to them both, stating they preferred to keep the business for themselves as opposed to being employed. Peter Jones' offer of 100% equity remains the highest in the show's history. Company was dissolved by 2017.) | | Dissolved (2017) |
| Episode 2 | 27 July 2014 | Daniel Eha and Matthew Cockroft | Pure Pet Food | 40,000 | 30 / 20 | Air dried dog food | Deborah Meaden / Kelly Hoppen (Note: Daniel and Matthew declined the offers of investment, stating they felt the equity was too high and were generally unhappy with the terms discussed. Company saw financial growth of over 300% since the episode's broadcast and remains active.) | | Active |
| Episode 4 | 10 August 2014 | Harriot Pleydell-Bouverie | Mallow & Marsh | 65,000 / 100,000 | 33 / 40 | Gourmet marshmallows | Deborah Meaden / Peter Jones (Note: Mallow & Marsh declined the offers of investment after she admitted an outside investor was already offering the original terms she was seeking. Remains active.) | | Active |
| Episode 8 | 15 February 2015 | Cally Russell | Mallzee | 75,000 | 15 | Fashion mobile commerce company and shopping application | Peter Jones (Note: Malzee declined Peter Jones's offer of investment, stating he was uncomfortable with the terms discussed. Dissolved in 2022.) | | Dissolved (2022) |

=== Series 13 ===
| Episode | First aired | Entrepreneur(s) | Company or product name | Money offered (£) | Equity offered % | Description of product | Proposed Dragon(s) | Website | Fate |
|---|---|---|---|---|---|---|---|---|---|
| Episode 2 | 19 July 2015 | Oliver Tezcan | The Idle Man | 200,000 | 60 | Online men's clothing brand | Touker Suleyman (Note: The Idle Man declined the offer of investment deeming the equity stake requested by Suleyman to be too high. Company dissolved by 2023.) | | Dissolved (2023) |
| Episode 4 | 2 August 2015 | Fiona Houston and Rory McFee | Mara Seaweed | 100,000 | 50 | Seaweed condiments | Touker Suleyman (Note: Mara Seaweed rejected the offer of investment deeming the equity requested by Suleyman to be too high. Company was bought out of administration in 2024. Remains active.) | | Sold (2024) |
| Episode 7 | 23 August 2015 | Ellen Green | Blue Badge Company | 70,000 | 35 | Fashion mobile commerce company and shopping application | Touker Suleyman (Note: Blue Badge Company declined Touker Suleyman's offer of investment, stating he was uncomfortable with the terms discussed. Company is in liquidation as of 2022.) | | Liquidation (2022) |
| Episode 8 | 30 August 2015 | Jo Hilditch | British Cassis | 50,000 | 40 / 35 / 20 | Wine crafting company | Deborah Meaden, Peter Jones and Sarah Willingham (Note: British Cassis declined all offers of investment, stating her accountant had pre-advised her not to release more than 20% of equity. Remains active.) | | Active |
| Episode 10 | 27 December 2015 | Roy Fitter | Ram Training Ltd | 80,000 | 30 | Horror events company | Peter Jones (Note: Ram Training declined Peter Jones's offer stating his uncomfortability at negotiating the offered equity without consulting his absent wife. Dissolved by 2022.) | | Dissolved (2022) |
| Episode 11 | 3 January 2016 | Natasha Bowes | Biotiful Dairy | 250,000 | 45 | Protein milk drink selections | Deborah Meaden (Note: Biotiful Dairy declined Deborah Meaden's offer deeming the equity requested to be too high. Remains active.) | | Active |
| Episode 13 | 24 January 2016 | Yann Morvan and Richard Lee | Aerodrums | 75,000 | 30 | Motion tracking drum kit | Peter Jones and Nick Jenkins (Note: Aerodrums declined the offer of investment deeming the equity requested by the dragons to be too high. Remains active.) | | Active |

=== Series 14 ===
| Episode | First aired | Entrepreneur(s) | Company or product name | Money offered (£) | Equity offered % | Description of product | Proposed Dragon(s) | Website | Fate |
|---|---|---|---|---|---|---|---|---|---|
| Episode 6 | 28 August 2016 | Andrew Nowell | PitPatPet | 150,000 | 20 | Dog Activity Monitor | Nick Jenkins and Deborah Meaden (Note: PitPatPet declined the offer of investment deeming the equity requested by the dragons to be too high. Remains active.) | | Active |
| Episode 7 | 4 September 2016 | Nick Hubert | AppyParking | 200,000 | 15 | An app to help drivers find parking spaces | Peter Jones and Nick Jenkins (Note: AppyParking declined the offer of investment deeming the equity requested by the dragons to be too high. Remains active.) | | Active |
| Episode 9 | 1 January 2017 | Sam Coley and Steve Pearce | TickX | 75,000 | 15 / 20 | Price comparison website | Touker Suleyman, Peter Jones and Nick Jenkins (Note: TickX declined the offers of investment deeming the equity requested by the dragons to be too high. Remains active.) | | Active |
| Episode 12 | 29 January 2017 | Joe Harper and Andy Sugden | Just Bee Drinks | 65,000 | 10 | Honey-infused, fruit-flavoured water | Peter Jones (Note: Just Bee Drinks declined Jones' offer of investment deeming the equity requested to be too high. Remains active.) | | Active |

=== Series 15 ===
| Episode | First aired | Entrepreneur(s) | Company or product name | Money offered (£) | Equity offered % | Description of product | Proposed Dragon(s) | Website | Fate |
|---|---|---|---|---|---|---|---|---|---|
| Episode 5 | 24 September 2017 | Chris Rose and Alex Baker | Sent Into Space | 130,000 | 35 | Send things into near space - e.g. ashes for funeral service | Deborah Meaden (Note: Sent Into Space declined the offer of investment deeming the equity requested by Meaden to be too high. Remains active.) | | Active |
| Episode 10 | 14 January 2018 | Jonathan Newman | Giving Tree Ventures | 75,000 | 35 | Freeze-dried fruit and vacuum-fried vegetable crisps | Tej Lalvani (Note: Giving Tree Ventures declined the offer of investment deeming the equity requested by the Lalvani to be too high. Remains active.) | | Active |
| Episode 12 | 4 February 2018 | Alex Somervell and Johnny Pryn | One Third Stories | 60,000 | 20 | Story books which teach languages to children. | Peter Jones (Note: One Third Stories declined the offer of investment deeming the equity requested by Jones to be too high. Company sold in 2024.) | | Sold (2024) |
| Episode 13 | 11 February 2018 | Rimi Dabhia | LoveRaw | 50,000 | 5 | Dairy, gluten, and refined-sugar-free snacks | Deborah Meaden (Note: LoveRaw declined the offer of investment deeming the equity requested by Meaden to be too high. Company in administration as of 2025.) | | In administration (2025) |
| Episode 14 | 18 February 2018 | Paul Varga, Tolulope Ogunsina, and Matthäus Ittner | Playbrush | 100,000 | 5 / 6 / 10 | Mobile app game teaching children on how to brush their teeth | Touker Suleyman, Peter Jones, Tej Lalvani and Deborah Meaden (Note: Playbrush declined the offer of investment deeming the equity requested by the dragons to be too high. Remains active.) | | Active |

=== Series 16 ===
| Episode | First aired | Entrepreneur(s) | Company or product name | Money offered (£) | Equity offered % | Description of product | Proposed Dragon(s) | Website | Fate |
|---|---|---|---|---|---|---|---|---|---|
| Episode 2 | 19 August 2018 | Noelle O'Connor and Aaron Lubrani | TanOrganic | 150,000 | 20 / 15 | Eco-certified self tanning lotion | Jenny Campbell, Tej Lalvani, Deborah Meaden and Touker Suleyman (Note: TanOrganic declined the offer of investment deeming the equity requested by the dragons to be too high. Remains active.) | | Active |
| Episode 5 | 9 September 2018 | Joe Moruzzi | Pleesecakes | 50,000 | 35 | Cheesecakes | Touker Suleyman (Note: Pleesecakes declined the offer of investment deeming the equity requested by Suleyman to be too high. Remains active.) | | Active |
| Episode 7 | 4 November 2018 | Lukas Passia and Vincent Efferoth | Noveltea | 80,000 | 30 | Alcohol flavoured tea | Jenny Campbell, Tej Lalvani and Touker Suleyman (Note: Noveltea declined the offer of investment following the dragons declining their counter-offer of 10%. Company sold in 2024.) | | Sold (2024) |
| Episode 8 | 11 November 2018 | Kirpal and Raj Bharaj | Stay Sixty | 70,000 | 33.33 | Reusable bottle for hot and cold drinks | Touker Suleyman (Note: Stay Sixty declined the offer of investment deeming the equity requested by Suleyman to be too high. Remains active.) | | Active |
| Episode 11 | 23 December 2018 | Hazel Anne Hamilton Reynolds | Randomise | 50,000 | 20 | Board games company | Jenny Campbell (Note: Randomise declined the offer of investment deeming the equity requested by Campbell to be too high. Remains active.) | | Active |
| Episode 12 | 6 January 2019 | Kim Lamzer and Charlotte Dauzat | Gato and Go | 50,000 | 30 / 25 (20% if money repaid in 18 months) | Gluten and dairy-free brownie desserts | Touker Suleyman and Tej Lalvani (Note: Gato and Go declined the offer of investment deeming the equity requested by the dragons to be too high. Dissolved by 2025.) | | Dissolved (2025) |
| Episode 14 | 27 January 2019 | Ben Knowles, Robert Sergeant and Chris Dixon | Pedal Me | 100,000 | 45 | Electric cargo bikes taxi services | Touker Suleyman (Note: Pedal Me declined the offer of investment deeming the equity requested by Suleyman to be too high and unfair to their current investors. Remains active.) | | Active |
| Episode 15 | 3 February 2019 | Daniel Pawson | Sea Chips | 30,000 | 35 | Salmon skin crisps | Touker Suleyman (Note: Sea Chips declined the offer of investment deeming the equity requested by Suleyman to be too high. Remains active.) | | Active |

=== Series 17 ===
| Episode | First aired | Entrepreneur(s) | Company or product name | Money offered (£) | Equity offered % | Description of product | Proposed Dragon(s) | Website | Fate |
|---|---|---|---|---|---|---|---|---|---|
| Episode 1 | 11 August 2019 | Aneisha Soobrooyen and Jack Walker | Scrumbles | 60,000 | 20 | Gut friendly food for cats and dogs | Deborah Meaden (Note: Scrumbles declined the offer of investment deeming the equity requested by Meaden to be too high. Remains active.) | | Active |
| Episode 7 | 22 September 2019 | Tony Walker and George Fox | Hedkayse | 100,000 | 25 | Cycle helmets made from enkayse | Tej Lalvani (Note: Hedkayse declined the offer of investment deeming the equity requested by Lalvani to be too high. Remains active.) | | Active |
| Episode 11 | 22 March 2020 | Patrick Tathem | Pliqo Travel Bag | 75,000 | 50 (35% when investment is returned) | Travel bag for suits | Sara Davies (Note: Pliqo declined the offer of investment deeming the equity requested by Davies to be too high. Remains active.) | | Active |
| Episode 13 | 5 April 2020 | Robert Thorp | Vite Brain | 45,000 | 25 | Nootropics infused drinks and snacks | Touker Suleyman (Note: Vite Brain declined the offer of investment citing the equity requested by Suleyman to be too high. Company is in liquidation as of 2023.) | | Liquidation (2023) |
| Episode 13 | 5 April 2020 | Alex Walsh and Yang Liu | JustWears | 80,000 | 20 | Cellulosic fibre-based men's underwear range | Tej Lalvani (Note: JustWears' declined the offer of investment, disagreeing with Lalvani's concerns over the valuation. Remains active.) | | Active |

=== Series 18 ===
| Episode | First aired | Entrepreneur(s) | Company or product name | Money offered (£) | Equity offered % | Description of product | Proposed Dragon(s) | Website | Fate |
|---|---|---|---|---|---|---|---|---|---|
| Episode 2 | 8 April 2021 | Gina Dorodvand and Hawaa Budraa | Uunn | 70,000 | 30 | Lens attachment displaying outstanding plaque on teeth | Touker Suleyman (Note: Uunn declined the offer of investment deeming the equity requested by Suleyman to be too high. Remains active.) | | Active |
| Episode 3 | 15 April 2021 | Helene Guillaume | Wild AI | 72,000 | 10 | Fitness and well-being mobile app for women | Peter Jones and Tej Lalvani (Note: Wild AI declined the offer of investment deeming the equity requested by the dragons to be unfair to her current investors. Remains active.) | | Active |
| Episode 5 | 29 April 2021 | Dr Simon Chard and Dr Ronah Escander | PÄRLA Toothpaste Tabs | 70,000 | 30 | Toothpaste tablets with recyclable glass jar | Tej Lalvani and Deborah Meaden (Note: PÄRLA declined the offer of investment deeming the equity requested by the dragons to be too high. Remains active.) | | Active |
| Episode 11 | 10 June 2021 | Ben Ridgeway and Liam Johnson | Yap Books | 100,000 | 25 | Interactive children's reading app | Touker Suleyman (Note: Yap Books' declined the offer of investment citing their displeasure with Suleyman's vision for the business. Remains active.) | | Active |

=== Series 19 ===
| Episode | First aired | Entrepreneur(s) | Company or product name | Money offered (£) | Equity offered % | Description of product | Proposed Dragon(s) | Website | Fate |
|---|---|---|---|---|---|---|---|---|---|
| Episode 5 | 3 February 2022 | Pasquale Totaro and Nathan Webb | Odd Ball | 100,000 | 10 / 15 | App connecting to balls creating music | Deborah Meaden and Touker Suleyman (Note: Odd Ball declined the offer of investment deeming the equity requested by the dragons to be too high. Remains active.) | | Active |
| Episode 6 | 10 February 2022 | Giorgia Granata and Eli Khrapko | Wype | 50,000 | 15 | Gel spray for toilet rolls | Touker Suleyman (Note: Wype declined the offer of investment believing that Suleyman did not share their visions for the future of the business. Remains active.) | | Active |
| Episode 10 | 10 March 2022 | Molly Masters | Books That Matter | 50,000 | 30 | Subscription delivery service for books with female authors | Touker Suleyman (Note: Books That Matter declined the offer of investment deeming the equity requested by Suleyman to be too high. Dissolved by 2025.) | | Dissolved (2025) |
| Episode 11 | 18 March 2022 | Wilmer and Elle Carcamo | Caribe Coffee Company | 30,000 | 25 | Ethically sourced and farmed coffee | Peter Jones (Note: The Caribe Coffee Company declined the offer of investment deeming the equity requested by Jones to be too high. Remains active.) | | Active |

=== Series 20 ===
| Episode | First aired | Entrepreneur(s) | Company or product name | Money offered (£) | Equity offered % | Description of product | Proposed Dragon(s) | Website | Fate |
|---|---|---|---|---|---|---|---|---|---|
| Episode 2 | 12 January 2023 | James Morgan and Anushka Fernando | Pop and Bark | 35,000 | 20 / 25 | Events organisers for dogs | Steven Bartlett and Touker Suleyman (Note: Pop and Bark declined the offer of investment, refusing to give away more than 15%. They immediately admitted their regret at not accepting Bartlett’s offer. Remains active.) | | Active |
| Episode 4 | 26 January 2023 | James Higgins | Ethical Bedding | 150,000 | 50 | Duvets and mattresses made from eucalyptus | Touker Suleyman (Note: Ethical Bedding declined Suleyman’s offer of investment deeming the equity requested to be too high. Remains active.) | | Active |
| Episode 7 | 16 February 2023 | Cally Russell | This Is Unfolded | 75,000 | 12.5 / 15 | Zero-waste fashion brand | Peter Jones and Deborah Meaden (Note: This Is Unfolded rejected the offer of investment deeming the equity requested to be too high. Russell was the first entrepreneur to reject investment twice, having appeared in a previous series (Season 12 Episode 8). Remains active.) | | Active |
| Episode 12 | 23 March 2023 | Ben Fry and Phil Pinder | The Potion's Cauldron | 200,000 | 33 (Reduced to 15% upon investment being repaid). | Wizard-themed golf course | Peter Jones (Note: The Potion’s Cauldron rejected Jones’ offer of investment, refusing to part with more than 12.5% equity upon repayment. Remains active.) | | Active |
| Episode 13 | 30 March 2023 | Fabian Clark and Rohan Radhakrishnan | Quarter | 50,000 | 10 / 25 | Gin at 12% ABV | Deborah Meaden and Touker Suleyman (Note: Quarter rejected the offers of investment, refusing to part with more than 6% equity. Remains active.) | | Active |

== Failed Pitches ==
=== Series 11 ===
| Episode | First aired | Entrepreneur(s) | Company or product name | Money requested (£) | Equity offered (%) | Description of product | Dragons' reaction | Website | Fate |
|---|---|---|---|---|---|---|---|---|---|
| Episode 1 | 11 August 2013 | Clare Lower | Gourmet Trotter | 125,000 | N/A | Mobile picnic hamper | Gourmet Trotter's pitch failed due to the dragons citing low sales and the weight of carrying the device. Terms of equity not broadcast. Dissolved by 2017. | N/A | Dissolved (2017) |
| Episode 1 | 11 August 2013 | Rachel and Alta Fogel | Bizzy Bitz | 80,000 | 10 | Construction toys | Bizzy Bitz's pitch failed due to the dragons citing low sales and high initial start-up costs. Remains active. | | Dissolved (2024) |
| Episode 1 | 11 August 2013 | Tayub Mushtaq and Afnan Bashir | World Gourmet Restaurants Ltd (renamed Wrap It Up) | 500,000 | 11 | International flavoured food wraps | World Gourmet Restaurants' pitch failed due to the dragons citing a lack of visual appeal and ridiculing the valuation. As of the date of broadcast, £500,000 was the highest amount of money ever pitched for. Remains active. | | Active |
| Episode 1 | 11 August 2013 | Richard Yu | Body Bottle | 50,000 | N/A | Body length hot water bottle | Body Bottle's pitch failed due to the dragons' disbelief that the product kept the whole body warm. Terms of equity not broadcast. Remains active. | N/A | Dissolved (2018) |
| Episode 2 | 18 August 2013 | Waqar Hassan | BUKcase | 75,000 | 20 | Hand-crafted cases for tablet computers and smartphones | BUKcase's pitch failed due to the dragons' belief that the product was not fit for purpose and over-engineering. Dissolved by 2015. | | Dissolved (2015) |
| Episode 2 | 18 August 2013 | Malcolm Victory | The Rotaire Dryline | 120,000 | 15 | Umbrella to dry washing in the rain | The Dryline's pitch failed due to the dragons' disbelief that the product would adequately dry clothes in poor weather. Dissolved by 2019. | | Dissolved (2019) |
| Episode 2 | 18 August 2013 | Clare and Matthew Naunton | Nappies2Go | 70,000 | 9 | Collection and delivery of disposable nappies for recycling | Nappies2Go's pitch failed due to the dragons' concern that the Naunton's would be financially strained if they quit employment to run the company and felt the industry to be too crowded for the product. Dissolved by 2014. | | Dissolved (2014) |
| Episode 2 | 18 August 2013 | Alba McConnell and Colin Pearson | Rio - A Taste Of Brazil (Cajado) | 50,000 | 20% | Brazilian food dishes | Cajado's pitch failed due to the dragons' belief that the investment requested was too low and felt it would need nearly £1 million to launch whilst also sensing the initial name would not appeal. Dissolved by 2021. | N/A | Dissolved (2021) |
| Episode 3 | 25 August 2013 | Laura Bartlett | Urban Coco | 100,000 | 15 | Online magazine for fashion and events | Urban Coco's pitch failed due to the dragons citing Bartlett's struggle to explain how she would use the investment belief that the magazine lacked appeal. Dissolved by 2016. | N/A | Dissolved (2016) |
| Episode 3 | 25 August 2013 | Timo Schmidt and James Carter | Gousto | 100,000 | 7 | Organic grocery delivery service | Gousto's pitch failed due to the dragons' concerns over their monthly losses and a rigid arrangement with other investors. Remains active. | | Active |
| Episode 4 | 1 September 2013 | Bob Cave and Steve Parsons | Easy-Lift Drain | 100,000 | 25 | Aid for lifting drains | Easy-Lift Drain's pitch failed due to the dragons' concerns over the weight of usage and whether Cave and Parson's would reach the number of drains in the UK as they claimed. | N/A | N/A |
| Episode 4 | 1 September 2013 | Sue McDonald, Linda Birtwhistle and Atul Khanna | Optifit | 40,000 | 10 | Bra-fitting service | Optifit's pitch failed due to the dragons' disbelief that women would measure themselves every time they buy a bra. Dissolved by 2025. | | Dissolved (2025) |
| Episode 4 | 1 September 2013 | Kate and Nigel Smith | The Makery Emporium | 50,000 | 10 | Crafting take-away workshops | The Makery Emporium's pitch failed due to the dragons’ concerns over Kate's struggle to remember her net profits whilst feeling the company's branding and valuation let her down. Dissolved by 2015. | | Dissolved (2015) |
| Episode 4 | 1 September 2013 | Richard Bowness and Steve Tonkin | Truncator sawhorse | 125,000 | 30 | Multiple cutting saw | Truncator sawhorse's pitch failed due to the dragons' belief that Bowness and Tonkin had over-estimated the size of the market and were dismayed by their attitude during the pitch. Remains active. | | Active |
| Episode 5 | 8 September 2013 | Alastair Hanson | Easy reed | 50,000 | 20 | Reed fitting device for instruments | Easy reed's pitch failed due to the dragons citing the ease of redesigning the fitting without using a reed and concerns over whether the pending patent would be approved. Remains active. | | Active |
| Episode 5 | 8 September 2013 | Alistair Taylor | Ladder Limb | 110,000 | 10 | Hanging tool for ladders | Ladder Limb's pitch failed due to the dragons citing Taylor's lack of knowledge on his revenue. Remains active. | | Active |
| Episode 5 | 8 September 2013 | Wendy Newby | She-icer / She-range | 50,000 | 20 | Chemical de-icer for female car owners | She-range's pitch failed due to the dragons citing the key locks were outdated by wireless devices and felt disillusioned as to why Newby aimed the de-icer only at females. Dissolved by 2014. | N/A | Dissolved (2014) |
| Episode 5 | 8 September 2013 | Robin and Kate Vincent | N/A | 60,000 | 90 | Tablet-computer handle | Robin and Kate Vincent's pitch failed due to the dragons' disbelief that the design was innovative whilst also citing the Vincent's intentions were to sell the business as opposed to gain investment. The pitch of 90% equity remains the highest in the show's history made by an entrepreneur. | N/A | N/A |
| Episode 5 | 8 September 2013 | Nikki Cooper | Inner Me | 100,000 | 20 | Supplements brand for women | Inner Me's pitch failed due to the dragons' concerns that the product's branding was misleading to indicate the product was for the beauty market whilst also concerned over Cooper's predictions of maintaining the same revenue each year. Dissolved by 2020. | | Dissolved (2020) |
| Episode 6 | 15 September 2013 | John McFarlane and Georgie Rodwell | Norfolk Cordial | 50,000 | 25 | Soft-drinks beverages | Norfolk Cordial's pitch failed due to the dragons' concerns over equity owned by current investors and whether John and Goergie diluting their shareholding so low would be fair in terms of running the company. Remains active. | | Active |
| Episode 6 | 15 September 2013 | David McNabb and Marco De Nichilo | Swarmly | 120,000 | 30 | Mobile phone app recommending places of food and drink | Swarmly's pitch failed due to the dragons citing predictions of annual losses for coming years. Dissolved by 2016. | N/A | Dissolved (2016) |
| Episode 6 | 15 September 2013 | Tracey and Kieran Cannon | My Lookalike Doll | 75,000 | 30 | Custom designed dolls | My Lookalike Doll's pitch failed due to the dragons citing high amounts of unsold stock and cutbacks on living expenses to fund the company. Company was dissolved by 2018. | | Dissolved (2018) |
| Episode 6 | 15 September 2013 | Manu Bhardwaj | Hot Pink | 100,000 | 35 | Jewellery designed by 3D technology | Hot Pink's pitch failed due to the dragons citing the 3D technology presented was easily replicable and felt the business was over-valued. Remains active. | | Dissolved (2015) |
| Episode 6 | 15 September 2013 | Alan Wright | A & R Plumbing Supplies | 20,000 | 10 | Mini-sized shower pump | A & R Plumbing Supplies's pitch failed due to the dragons citing a lack of clarity in Wright's pitch as to whether the product was simply a smaller fitting or producing the same output as a bigger device. Remains active. | | Active |
| Episode 7 | 26 January 2014 | Fredy Vasilev | Unique Automation | 1,000,000 | 20 | Mobile app controlling bathroom fittings | Unique Automation's pitch failed due to the dragons citing products doing the same functions were already on the market and were overall dismayed by Vasilev's explanation on how he would spend the £1 million. Remains active. | | Active |
| Episode 7 | 26 January 2014 | Duncan Wood | Big Waves | 100,000 | 20 | LED face mask | Big Waves's pitch failed due to the dragons' belief that the fundamentals of the light used in technology were dangerous and untested for health and safety. Dissolved by 2015. | | Dissolved (2015) |
| Episode 7 | 26 January 2014 | Aurora Tyas | Pop&Go Knickers | 65,000 | 20 | Travel underwear for women | Pop&Go Knickers' pitch failed due to the dragons' belief that Aurora had over inflated her sales expectations and that the market was limited. Dissolved by 2018. | | Dissolved (2018) |
| Episode 7 | 26 January 2014 | Stuart Kirby and Helen Morris | The Dooup | 70,000 | 7 | Device clearing dog waste | The Dooup's pitch failed due to the dragons citing concerns over the design and net losses close to the amount pitched for. Remains active. | | Active |
| Episode 8 | 2 February 2014 | David Solomons and Mike Edwards | Snugglebundl | 100,000 | 20 | Baby-lifting blanket | Snugglebundl's pitch failed due to the dragons' concerns that the product was unsafe whilst Meaden felt the valuation was double what was required. Remains active. | | Active |
| Episode 8 | 2 February 2014 | Dr Samantha Decombel and Dr Stuart Grice | Play DNA | N/A | N/A | Premier scientific artwork | Fitness Genes' pitch failed due to the dragons not understanding why DNA was the main subject of the paintings, subsequently citing the market as restricted. Terms not broadcast. Dissolved by 2016. | | Dissolved (2016) |
| Episode 8 | 2 February 2014 | Lynwen Harrison and Rachel Smith | nouriSH me now | 75,000 | 15 | Sports recovery drink | nouriSH me now's pitch failed due to the dragons citing the company's struggle to get the drink into wide distribution. Dissolved by 2023. | | Dissolved (2023) |
| Episode 8 | 2 February 2014 | Joe Nelson | TheyFit (renamed My One Condoms) | 200,000 | 10 | Multiple sized condoms | TheyFit's pitch failed. Remains active. (Note: {{See Clarity of investments and treatment of entrepreneurs}}) | | Active |
| Episode 9 | 9 February 2014 | David Brown | Graffiti Artist | 70,000 | 20 | Online design-at-home graffiti art | Graffiti Artist's pitch failed due to the dragons' disbelief that the business would reach Brown's predicted profits. Remains active. | | Active |
| Episode 9 | 9 February 2014 | Christian and Carolyn van Outersterp | Jolly Days Luxury Camping | 200,000 | 20 | Camping holidays | Jolly Days Luxury Camping's pitch failed due to the dragons citing Christian and Carolyn could not assure that they had a long-term lease on the campsites and disbelief that the company would regularly sell-out their camping spaces. Remains active. | | Active |
| Episode 9 | 9 February 2014 | Nuala and Christopher Lewis | Slouch Mat | N/A | N/A | Padding for laptop use on sofas | Slouch Mat's pitch failed due to the dragons' dislike of the product's appearance and felt the concept was dated. Terms not broadcast. Dissolved by 2015. | | Dissolved (2015) |
| Episode 10 | 16 February 2014 | Peter and Claire Lomas | Towbag | 50,000 | 15 | Foldaway trailer for cars | Towbag's pitch failed due to the dragons' concerns over the durability of the product and that the market was too small to consider investment. Remains active. | | Dissolved (2018) |
| Episode 10 | 16 February 2014 | Benjamin Mougarbel | Benjamin's Hot Chocolate | 65,000 | 10 | Hot-chocolate made from Ghana sourced coffee-beans | Benjamin's Hot Chocolate's pitch failed due to the dragons citing Benjamin's dishonesty that he had already secured over £400,000 investment and the product's calorie count as unhealthy. Dissolved by 2023. | | Dissolved (2023) |
| Episode 10 | 16 February 2014 | Rory O'Loughlin | Frogjaw | N/A | N/A | Spoon stand | Frogjaw's pitch failed due to the dragons' belief that the product was unappealing and that it would not sell in major volumes. Terms not broadcast. Company appears to have been dissolved. | | Dissolved |
| Episode 10 | 16 February 2014 | Karoline Gross | Smartzer | 100,000 | 10 | Mobile and web application for interactive online video content | Smartzer's pitch failed due to the dragons citing the concept was already on the market and felt the company's fees to be overpriced . Remains active. | | Active |
| Episode 11 | 23 February 2014 | Erika Brodnock | Karisma Kidz | 60,000 | 10 | Dolls aiding children with mental health issues | Karisma Kidz's pitch failed due to the dragons' belief that school's would not fund the dolls and advised Brodnock that the business may be more of a social enterprise. Remains active. | | Active |
| Episode 11 | 23 February 2014 | Simon Weatherall | Glow Faster | 80,000 | 30 | Running jacket with visible reflector lights for traffic | Glow Faster's pitch failed due to the dragons' belief that the product was no different to what was already on the market and were unimpressed with the product's design. Dissolved by 2018. | | Dissolved (2018) |
| Episode 11 | 23 February 2014 | Chris Gibson | SuperTie | N/A | N/A | Automatic knot tying tie | SuperTie's pitch failed due to the dragons' belief that it distracted one from learning how to tie a knot. Terms not broadcast. Dissolved by 2021. | | Dissolved (2021) |
| Episode 11 | 23 February 2014 | Tony Higson | The Freefold | N/A | N/A | Lightweight crease-free suit carrier | The Freefold's pitch failed due to the dragons' disbelief that all suits would prove crease free. Terms not broadcast. Dissolved by 2019. | | Dissolved (2019) |
| Episode 12 | 2 March 2014 | John MacLeod | LUX Creations Ltd (renamed Clear Notes) | 50,000 | 10 | Design company for stationary papers | LUX Creations' pitch failed due to Meaden citing her previous investment in Magic Whiteboard conflicted with a possible investment and the remainder of the dragons citing no orders had been placed and lacked patent protection. Dissolved by 2017. | | Dissolved (2017) |
| Episode 12 | 2 March 2014 | Tracy Birch and Kari-Helene Rane | Fashion design house (Purl Alpaca Designs Limited) | 125,000 | 25 | Wool based knitting patterns for clothing | Fashion design house's pitch failed due to the dragons' belief that the business model was dated and ridiculed the valuation having been based on net losses. Remains active. | | Active |
| Episode 12 | 2 March 2014 | Julie Wilson and Amy Livingstone | Cheeky Chompers | 70,000 | 10 | Baby bibs | Cheeky Chompers's pitch failed due to the dragons' belief that the market was restricted to gift packages and subsequently felt an investor would take an unfair amount of equity. Remains active. | | Active |
| Episode 12 | 2 March 2014 | Dr Ganesh Rao and Timothy Harwood | Treatment Saver | 100,000 | 20 | Price-comparison website for cosmetic surgery | Treatment Saver's pitch failed due to the dragons' belief that more money was needed to increase the internet traffic for their website. Dissolved by 2017. | | Dissolved (2017) |
| Episode 12 | 2 March 2014 | Nathan Lightbody | Heal Ink | N/A | N/A | Tattoo aftercare oil | Heal Ink's pitch failed due to the dragons citing their lack of knowledge regarding the industry. Terms not broadcast. Company was dissolved in 2013, before the episode's broadcast. | | Dissolved (2013) |
| Episode 12 | 20 July 2014 | Anna Maria Kotarba-Morley | Building Blocks of the Lost Past | N/A | N/A | Antique and archaeology computer game for tablets | Anna Morley's pitch failed due to the dragons citing their lack of knowledge in the field of computer games. Terms not broadcast. The game does not appear to have been released. | N/A | Unreleased |

=== Series 12 ===
| Episode | First aired | Entrepreneur(s) | Company or product name | Money requested (£) | Equity offered (%) | Description of product | Dragons' reaction | Website | Fate |
|---|---|---|---|---|---|---|---|---|---|
| Episode 1 | 20 July 2014 | John and Claire Brumby | Scrubbys Vegetable Crisps | 75,000 | 15 | Low-fat vegetable crisps | Scrubbys Vegetable Crisps' pitch failed due to the dragons' concerns over the amount of debt the business was in. Company was bought out of administration in 2016 by AIB Foods Ltd and remains active. | | Sold (2017) |
| Episode 1 | 20 July 2014 | Phil Parsons | Replicable war machine | 98,000 | 15 | Life sized toy war-tank | Replicable war machine's pitch failed due to the dragons citing a lack of eco-friendly materials and low sales. | N/A | N/A |
| Episode 2 | 27 July 2014 | George and Joan McCrossan | Colour Me Shave | 65,000 | 35 | Male-grooming gel | Colour Me Shave's pitch failed due to the dragons citing a high production cost and RRP and disbelief that the product was unique. Dissolved by 2017. | | Dissolved (2017) |
| Episode 2 | 27 July 2014 | Norman Wright | The Weird And Wonderful | 50,000 | 20 | High street selling natural history statues | The Weird And Wonderful's pitch failed due to the dragons' concerns over the ethics of animal hunting. Dissolved by 2024. | | Dissolved (2024) |
| Episode 3 | 3 August 2014 | Thomas Harrington | wesold.co.uk | 75,000 | 20 | Pay-per-view online estate agent | Thomas Harrington's pitch failed due to the dragons citing Harrington's business model was based around the number of viewings on the website and not focussed on the sale of the property. Remains active. | | Active |
| Episode 3 | 3 August 2014 | Sally Pattie | Doddle For Dogs | 45,000 | 10 | Combined dog lead and collar | Doddle For Dogs's pitch failed due to the dragons' concern over the weight and dogs struggling with the overall concept. Dissolved by 2018. | | Dissolved (2018) |
| Episode 3 | 3 August 2014 | Akeem Ojuko | The Wild Peanut | 50,000 | 20 | Flavoured peanut range | The Wild Peanut's pitch failed due to the dragons' concerns over the amount of unsold stock and lack of net profits. Dissolved by 2016. | | Dissolved (2016) |
| Episode 3 | 3 August 2014 | Kate Arnold | Hair Hangerz | 45,000 | 10 | Clips for hair extensions | Hair Hangerz's pitch failed due to the dragons' belief that the product was over complicated and would easily be replaced with basic clip products already on the market. Dissolved by 2018. | | Dissolved (2018) |
| Episode 4 | 10 August 2014 | Richard and Lynn Bye | Fat Lad At The Back | 80,000 | 10 | Cycle wear for differing sizes | Fat Lad At The Back's pitch failed due to the dragons' dislike of the brand name and belief that the market was restricted. Remains active. | | Active |
| Episode 4 | 10 August 2014 | Jordan Schlipf and Andrew Tan | Morella | 50,000 | 10 | Drinks holder for an umbrella | Morella's pitch failed due to the dragons' disbelief that product would sell to a mass market. Dissolved by 2019. | | Dissolved (2019) |
| Episode 4 | 10 August 2014 | David Robinson and Phil Law | UKick Ltd | 60,000 | 25 | Feather kicking toys | UKick's pitch failed due to the dragons citing low profit margins. Remains active. | | Active |
| Episode 4 | 10 August 2014 | Denise Anstey | Slik Stik | 45,000 | 35 | LED walking stick | Slik Stik's pitch failed due to the dragons citing Anstey's lack of knowledge on the demand for walking sticks and disbelief there was a sufficient market for investment. Remains active. | | Active |
| Episode 5 | 17 August 2014 | Vicky Pullen and Chantelle Goddard-Jones | Arctic Quest Ltd | 100,000 | 20 | Husky sleigh rides | Arctic Quest Ltd's pitch failed due to the dragons' concerns over what the investment would be spent on and disbelief that the valuation was accurate despite £38,000 in assets. Remains active. | | Active |
| Episode 5 | 17 August 2014 | Jim Campbell, Reuben Maltby, and Simon Hasslacher | Ozindas Limited (renamed Hasslachers) | 150,000 | 13 | Colombian hot chocolate drinks | Ozindas's pitch failed due to the dragons' concerns over how much effort the trio would put into the business and cited their struggle to predict profit forecasts. Remains active. | | Active |
| Episode 5 | 17 August 2014 | Chris Kempt | Stunt Guy (Kempt Ltd) | 250,000 | 25 | Computer game/s for tablets and smartphones | Stunt Guy 2's pitch failed after the Dragons described the project as too much of a punt. Following this, Kempt secured EU funding and, in 2015, its studio team and operations were integrated into Mediatonic Group to form a new venture, Burke & Best. The arrangement provided match funding for the EU grant, with Chris Kempt taking on the leadership of the new studio and receiving an interest in the wider group. He has since been involved in several other successful games ventures. | | Dissolved (2019) |
| Episode 5 | 17 August 2014 | Patrick Gavin and Chris Bibby | Blooming Simple | 100,000 | 10 | Card and flower vase gift packages | Blooming Simple's pitch failed due to the dragons' belief that the products were overpriced. Dissolved by 2019. | | Dissolved (2019) |
| Episode 5 | 17 August 2014 | Alan and Jill Boulton | Visorcat | 80,000 | 10 | Wash and wipe for motorcycle helmets | Visorcat's pitch failed due to the dragons citing low sales and a major start up cost. Remains active. | | Active |
| Episode 5 | 17 August 2014 | Hugh Roper and Nathan Wills | Torch Apparel | 75,000 | 10 | Cycle helmets with battery powered lights | Torch Apparel's pitch failed due to the dragons citing a lack of patent protection. Dissolved by 2024. | | Dissolved (2024) |
| Episode 6 | 24 August 2014 | Rob Goodman and Nigel Travis | Magnet-Ease | N/A | N/A | Magnet golf tees | Magnet-Ease's pitch failed due to the dragons citing a high RRP and concerns that the duo did not appear convinced that they could sell the product. Terms not broadcast. Remains active. | | Active |
| Episode 6 | 24 August 2014 | Jim Jemison | Stowaway Designs Limited | 25,000 | 25 | Air filled pop-up garden furniture | Stowaway Designs's pitch failed due to the dragons citing safety issues and lack of clarity on the manufacturing. Dissolved in 2015. | N/A | Dissolved (2015) |
| Episode 6 | 24 August 2014 | Jenan Kazim | KAZbrella | N/A | N/A | Umbrella folding inside-out | KAZbrella's pitch failed due to the dragons failing to see a unique difference to the ordinary umbrella. Terms not broadcast. Remains active. | | Active |
| Episode 7 | 25 January 2015 | Henry Ofodieze | Easybulb | 75,000 | 10 | Smartphone-operated bulbs | Easybulb's pitch failed due to the dragons citing a smartphone app was already on the market performing the same task with average electrical systems and was not patentable. Remains active. | | Active |
| Episode 7 | 25 January 2015 | Tom Hunt, Luke Shipley, Joe Hollingworth | sTitch Leggings | 20,000 | 20 | Fashion leggings for men | sTitch Leggings' pitch failed due to the dragons overall belief that the product would not appeal to a male demographic. Terms of equity not broadcast. Dissolved by 2019. | | Dissolved (2019) |
| Episode 8 | 1 February 2015 | Charlie Anson | Charlie's Cartoons | 40,000 | 20 | Hand-drawn caricatures | Charlie's Cartoons' pitch failed due to the dragons' concerns over potential negative feedback from customers and Anson's ambitious financial forecasts. Dissolved by 2016. | | Dissolved (2016) |
| Episode 8 | 1 February 2015 | James and Kelly George | My Little Princess Parties | 25,000 | 20 | Fairytale entertainment for children's parties | My Little Princess Parties' pitch failed due to the dragons' belief that the concept was easily replicated and concerns over the company's lack of knowledge on security risks of entering private homes. Remains active. | | Active |
| Episode 8 | 1 February 2015 | Lloyd Daley and Steven Freeman | Earcandi | 40,000 | 10 | Moulding caps for earphones | Earcandi's pitch failed due to the dragons' concerns that modern headphones would grip the ear well enough and the cost of the product. Dissolved by 2016. | | Dissolved (2016) |
| Episode 8 | 1 February 2015 | John Wakefield-Smith | Liberator Technology | 100,000 | 50 | Hybrid scooter bikes | Liberator Technology's pitch failed due to the dragons' concerns over safety when riding the scooters. Remains active. | N/A | Active |
| Episode 9 | 8 February 2015 | Charlotte King | ShoeLicks | 30,000 | 25 | Stick on patterned soles for affordable high street heels | ShoeLicks' pitch failed due to the dragons citing issues with the appearance of the products and concerns over users having to trim the stickers themselves. | | Unclear |
| Episode 9 | 8 February 2015 | Andy Needham and Dan Cluddery | Approved Food Ltd | 150,000 | 10 | Website that sells food past its use-by date | Approved Food's pitch failed due to the dragons citing large financial losses and belief that the duo needed to make a profit before asking for investment. Remains active. | | Active |
| Episode 10 | 15 February 2015 | Michael Jay Scott | Matrix RS Ltd | 195,000 | 25 | Anti-piracy device for sailors | Matrix RS's pitch failed due to the dragons citing Scott's limited research into the technology mistakenly identifying random people, whilst also stating their disappointment at Scott's lack of engagement whilst pitching. Dissolved by 2023. | | Dissolved (2023) |
| Episode 10 | 15 February 2015 | Tom De Pelet | Hornit | 100,000 | 10 | Horn for bicycles | Hornit's pitch failed due to the dragons citing low net profits and concerns over the number of orders placed to date. Remains active. | | Active |
| Episode 10 | 15 February 2015 | Andrew Jewson and Gary Patterson | Jackpen | N/A | N/A | Miniature pen stored in headphone jack sockets | Jackpen's pitch failed due to the dragons citing fundamental issues with the ease of the product breaking and a lack of patent protection. Terms not broadcast. Remains active. | | Active |
| Episode 11 | 22 February 2015 | Scott Fidgett and Samuel Parham | Airwheel | N/A | N/A | Airwheel mobility devices | Turbowheel's pitch failed due to the dragons' concerns over safety when in use and sales forecasts. Terms not broadcast. Dissolved by 2021. | | Dissolved (2021) |
| Episode 11 | 22 February 2015 | David Fannin and Shaun Moore | Sorcit Ltd (Colapz) | 150,000 | 15 | Collapsible camping equipment | Sorcit's pitch failed due to the dragons citing a previous shareholder still retained all intellectual property and concerns the business subsequently had little profitability. Company was sold in 2022. | | Sold (2022) |
| Episode 11 | 15 February 2015 | Nicola Frith and Lindsey Oldroyd | Granny Marmalade | 50,000 | 20 | Selection of marmalades | Granny Marmalade's pitch failed due to the dragons' concerns over the branding and lacked a unique taste. Remains active. | | Active |
| Episode 11 | 15 February 2015 | Nick Monrow, Daniel and Roderick Butterfield | Funslinger | 100,000 | 20 | Throw and catching game | Funslinger's pitch failed due to the dragons' concerns over the size of premise size to play the game on and lack of sales. Remains active. | | Active |
| Episode 12 | 15 March 2015 | John Paul Rae and Craig Chatwin | Herbie Trailer Skips | 50,000 | 15 | Roadside waste removal skips | Herbie Trailer Skips' pitch failed due to the dragons' concerns over parking regulations and the cost of production. Dissolved by 2019. | | Dissolved (2019) |
| Episode 12 | 15 March 2015 | Chris Parsmal | Dare Snacks | 20,000 | 20% | Edible insects snacks | Dare Snacks' pitch failed due to the dragons' concerns over Parsmal's marketing approach. | N/A | N/A |
| Episode 12 | 15 March 2015 | Neomi Bennett | Neo Slip | 40,000 | 10 | Aid for medical and travel stockings | Neo Slip's pitch failed due to the dragons citing issues with the status of the patent. Remains active. | | Active |
| Episode 12 | 15 March 2015 | Matthew Hinkley and Elliott Suiter | Institchu | 70,000 | 10 | Online custom suit tailor | Institchu's pitch failed due to the dragons citing the rights were owned by an international company and low profits from distribution. Dissolved by 2015, however the parent company continues to trade in Australia. | | Dissolved (2015) |
| Episode 12 | 15 March 2015 | Miranda Harper | Zaini Hats | 50,000 | 20 | Beanie hats | Zaini Hats' pitch failed due to the dragons citing similar products on the market and Harper's struggle to determine her target market. Remains active. | | Active |

=== Series 13 ===
| Episode | First aired | Entrepreneur(s) | Company or product name | Money requested (£) | Equity offered (%) | Description of product | Dragons' reaction | Website | Fate |
|---|---|---|---|---|---|---|---|---|---|
| Episode 1 | 12 July 2015 | Farnaz Khan | Fit Britches | 75,000 | 5 | Slimming shapewear | Fit Britches' pitch failed due to the dragons citing Khan's struggle to remember her finances and belief that she was more in need of a mentor than investor. Dissolved by 2016. | | Dissolved (2016) |
| Episode 1 | 12 July 2015 | Fraser Fearnhead | Housecrowd | 1,000,000 | 5 | Property crowdfunding | Housecrowd's pitch failed due to the dragons citing the valuation as ludicrous having failed to make a profit to date and had already received an investment offer from a company who valued his business. Dissolved by 2021. | | Dissolved (2021) |
| Episode 2 | 19 July 2015 | Simon Meadows | SplashToppa (Cement mixer lid) | N/A | N/A | Lid fitting for cement mixers | SplashToppa's pitch failed due to the dragons' belief that Meadows' pitch was comical as well as citing building sites as generally dirty and such devices were not required. Remains active. | | Active |
| Episode 3 | 26 July 2015 | Emma Lanman | Van Girls | 75,000 | 10 | Female run goods removal service | Van Girls' pitch failed due to the dragons' concerns over profit margins and the company's branding on gender neutrality. Dissolved by 2018. | | Dissolved (2018) |
| Episode 3 | 26 July 2015 | Arshad Bhunoo | Funkybod | N/A | N/A | Muscle boosting padded clothing | Funkybod's pitch failed due to the dragons' concerns over the misleading concept of the product. Terms not broadcast. Remains active. | | Active |
| Episode 3 | 26 July 2015 | Freya and Judy Bass | The Handbag Spa | 60,000 | 20 | Cleaning and restoration of designer handbags | The Handbag Spa's pitch failed due to the dragons citing the profits described were from another business that was not part of the investment. Remains active. | | Active |
| Episode 3 | 26 July 2015 | Graham and Lorraine Downward | Lign Light | 120,000 | 30 | Underwater light for scuba divers | The Limelight's pitch failed due to the dragons' concerns over how much the annual patent renewal was costing the business and how much money the Downwards had lost in preparing it. Dissolved by 2021. | | Dissolved (2021) |
| Episode 4 | 2 August 2015 | Mat Cottam | Loodini | 30,000 | 10 | Card-sized hygiene device | Loodini's pitch failed due to the dragons citing low sales and concerns over his financial forecasts. Dissolved by 2022. | | Dissolved (2022) |
| Episode 4 | 2 August 2015 | Ali Mustapha | Shine Like A Celeb | 22,000 | N/A | Sparkle body cream | Shine Like A Celeb's pitch failed due to the dragons' belief that the product did not perform as well as expected whilst also citing the RRP of £50 to be too high. Terms of equity not broadcast. Remains active. | | Active |
| Episode 5 | 9 August 2015 | Colum McLornan and Claire Hunter | Rule of Crumb | 60,000 | 15 | Gluten-free food range | Rule of Crumb's pitch failed due to the dragons' concerns over the size of the market and citing the duo had another business, questioning their commitments to the investment. Remains active. | | Active |
| Episode 5 | 9 August 2015 | Dr Akhtar Khalil | My Smart Remote | 200,000 | 20 | Car security device | My Smart Remote's pitch failed due to the dragons citing fundamental flaws with the product in that if one's mobile phone or tablet lost power, the device could not be used, as well as concerns over the size of the market. Remains active. | | Active |
| Episode 5 | 9 August 2015 | Howard Barr | Rain Diva | 40,000 | 20 | Rain protective hats for women | Rain Diva's pitch failed due to the dragons' concerns over the cost of production and RRP, as well as concerns over the market size. Although the pitch was filmed first, Barr had already achieved investment on Dragon's Den (Canada) by the time the episode had aired. Remains active in Canada. | | Active |
| Episode 5 | 9 August 2015 | Paul Maden and James Findlay | Cocoa Mountain | 80,000 | 15 | Gourmet chocolate selections | Cocoa Mountain's pitch failed due to the dragons citing the company had made only £57,000 after nine years and were unable to accept large orders. Remains active. | | Active |
| Episode 6 | 16 August 2015 | Tony and Jamie Smith | City Tuks Tuks | 65,000 | 20 | Tuk tuk taxis | City Tuks Tuks' pitch failed due to the duo's struggle to calculate their profits and a lack of licenses to operate in city centres. Dissolved by 2018. | | Dissolved (2018) |
| Episode 6 | 16 August 2015 | David Breeze | Gold Disc Dave | 30,000 | 15 | Personalised framed music gifts | Gold Disc Dave's pitch failed due to the dragons' concerns over the size of the market and general distaste for the products. Dissolved by 2024. | | Dissolved (2024) |
| Episode 6 | 16 August 2015 | Stephen Purdham | 3-rings Care | 300,000 | 10 | Notification service for electrical devices | 3-rings Care's pitch failed due to the dragons citing the product's lack of first line response as well as Purdham's wealth as being enough to invest himself. Dissolved by 2023. | | Dissolved (2023) |
| Episode 7 | 23 August 2015 | Adam Symons and Tarik Fatihi | HAIRCVT | 80,000 | 5 | Online hairdresser booking service | HAIRCVT's pitch failed due to the dragons citing the company's lack of market research and fundamental issues with the online booking system. Company's uk listing was dissolved by 2017, however appears to remain active in France. | | Active |
| Episode 7 | 23 August 2015 | Michael Corrigan and David Kellock | Napscarf | 65,000 | 10 | Travel accessories | Napscarf's pitch failed due to the dragons’ discomfort whilst wearing the product whilst citing a lack of patent protection. Remains active. | | Active |
| Episode 7 | 23 August 2015 | Rachel Wicklow | Secret Sausages | 50,000 | 15 | Vegetable sausages made with no meat or meat substitutes | Secret Sausages' pitch failed due to the dragons' disbelief that vegetables disguised as sausages was a sustainable branding concept, whilst concerned over an overall distaste for the product. Remains active. | | Active |
| Episode 8 | 30 August 2015 | Ajit Chambers | Old London Underground Company | 2,000,000 | 51 | Renovating a disused underground station into a tourist attraction | Old London Underground Company's pitch failed due to the dragons citing that Chambers did not own a lease to Down Street tube station, as well as citing the amount asked for as a high risk investment for the concept. Dissolved by 2016. | | Dissolved (2016) |
| Episode 8 | 30 August 2015 | Jenny McLaughlan and Lorraine Young | Gumigem Ltd | 30,000 | 15 | Range of children's products for teething and chewing aids for the sensory market | Gumigem Ltd's pitch failed due to the dragons citing McLaughlan had already sold all company rights in America for just £2000 and her miscalculation of her turnovers and profits. Dissolved by 2025. | | Dissolved (2025) |
| Episode 8 | 30 August 2015 | Simon Llewellyn | Hot Diggidy Dog | N/A | N/A | Spicy pepper sauces | Hot Diggity Dog's pitch failed due to the dragons citing a highly competitive market and believed the product needed more money than Llewellyn requested. Terms not broadcast. Remains active. | | Active |
| Episode 8 | 30 August 2015 | John Readman | Ride25 | 250,000 | 25 | Cycling adventure holidays | Ride25's pitch failed due to the dragons citing low sales and subsequently advised Readman not to expand before gaining a bigger turnover. Remains active. | | Active |
| Episode 9 | 6 September 2015 | Pelham Vincent and David Hall | Foldsmart Ltd | 150,000 | 10 | Easy assemble flat pack furniture | Foldsmart Ltd's pitch failed due to the dragons' concerns that Vincent and Hall had been misled by market researchers over the valuation of their company and lacked experience in running the business. Remains active. | | Active |
| Episode 9 | 6 September 2015 | Dorothy McLaren and Chelsea Hayes | School Trunk | 90,000 | 10 | Storage business for public schools | School Trunk's pitch failed due to the dragons citing low sales and concerns that the company lacked a unique selling point as the trunks were similar to products already on the market. Remains active. | | Active |
| Episode 9 | 6 September 2015 | Fabio Molle | Funky Christmas Jumpers | 75,000 | 10 | Christmas clothing ranges | Funky Christmas Jumpers' pitch failed due to the dragons' concerns over the RRP and lack of unique selling points for a seasonal business. Dissolved by 2015. | | Dissolved (2015) |
| Episode 9 | 6 September 2015 | Kia and Scarlet Bannatyne; The youngest entrepreneurs to enter the den as of 2022, aged 14 and 12 respectively. | Crikey Bikey Ltd | 25,000 | 10 | Cycling harness for bike learners | Crikey Bikey's pitch failed due to the dragons' belief that the transition for bike riders from stab;lisers to without was not hard to learn and concerns that the Bannatyne's mother could only run the business in spare time and would subsequently lead to an investment being used rapidly. Dissolved by 2018. | | Dissolved (2018) |
| Episode 10 | 27 December 2015 | Sajda Rashid | X-grey | 50,000 | 10 | Female anti-grey hairs aging product | X-grey's pitch failed due to the dragons' concerns over hazard issues and lack of clarity on animal testing. Rashid stated her dismay of the criticism following filming stating all products were naturally sourced except for one and hazards were not an issue nor animal testing. Dissolved by 2017. | | Dissolved (2017) |
| Episode 10 | 27 December 2015 | Chris Ford | Tap2Tag Ltd | 75,000 | 20 | Scannable medical alert devices | Tap2Tag's pitch failed due to the dragons' concerns over the reliability of the product in life or death situations and Ford's PR and marketing strategy. Remains active. | | Active |
| Episode 11 | 3 January 2016 | Dominic Thorpe and Matt Boyles | Wireless Fitness | 100,000 | 15 | App for music-based exercise workouts | Wireless Fitness's pitch failed due to the dragons' concern over how much marketing the app would take to launch and whether the duo were experienced enough to run the company. Dissolved by 2020. | N/A | Dissolved (2020) |
| Episode 11 | 3 January 2016 | Peter Ashley | Easy X Chair | 55,000 | 15 | Wheelchair and office chair incorporated with exercise tools | Easy X Chair's pitch failed due to the dragons citing little difference to Ashley's previous pitch on the show in Series 3. Dissolved by 2017. | | Unclear |
| Episode 12 | 10 January 2016 | Pete Ancketill | Glassbusters | 200,000 | 10 | Glass compacting creating Eco-Sand | Glassbusters' pitch failed due to the dragons' concerns that recycling companies were a more popular solution and ridiculed the valuation. Company in liquidation as of 2023. | | Liquidation (2023) |
| Episode 12 | 10 January 2016 | Rob Shaw | The Crackin' Egg Company | 80,000 | 20 | Pre-boiled eggs with painted shells | The Crackin' Egg Company's pitch failed due to the dragons' concerns over the RRP and profit forecasts. Company in liquidation as of 2024. | | Liquidation (2024) |
| Episode 13 | 24 January 2016 | Daniel Luxon | uShoot Studios | 50,000 | 20 | Remotely controlled high-quality product photography machines | uShoot Studios' pitch failed due to the dragons' belief that the service could be done at home without aid and that the market was limited. Dissolved by 2025. | | Dissolved (2025) |
| Episode 13 | 24 January 2016 | Lisa Young | Sunless Solutions | 60,000 | 20 | Tent for spray tanning | Sunless Solutions pitch failed due to the dragons' concerns over how Young would use the investment and dismay that she had already turned down an offer of £100,000 for the patent. Dissolved by 2024. | | Dissolved (2024) |
| Episode 14 | 31 January 2016 | Calum Leslie | Wooju | 75,000 | 10 | Smartphone app for taking pictures | Wooju's pitch failed due to the dragons' belief that the app was easily replicated and cited a lack of current users. Dissolved by 2016. | N/A | Dissolved (2016) |
| Episode 14 | 31 January 2016 | Robbie Ward | Drink Command Limited | 200,000 | 10 | Self-serving draft beer | Drink Command's pitch failed due to the dragons' disbelief that the company needed the investment and ridiculed the valuation. Dissolved by 2017. | | Dissolved (2017) |
| Episode 15 | 21 February 2016 | Jonathan and Tabitha Cowan | Open Goaaal | 150,000 | 15 | Football goal net for rebounds in back gardens | Open Goaaal's pitch failed due to the dragons' concerns over copyright issues and ridiculing his valuation. Remains active. | | Active |
| Episode 15 | 21 February 2016 | Harry and Charlie Thuillier | Oppo Ice Cream | 60,000 | 7 | Ice cream made from virgin coconut oil and stevia leaf | Oppo Ice Cream's pitch failed due to the dragons fearing the company was immediately set to make a loss with the amount of unsold stock. Remains active having later secured £350,000 from crowdfunding. | | Active |
| Episode 15 | 21 February 2016 | James Talbot | Damson Limited (Twist) | 250,000 | 12.5 | Headphones allowing ease of noise of surroundings | Damson Limited's pitch failed due to the dragons citing Talbot's struggle to calculate his margins and concerns over the safety of his device. Remains active. | | Active |

=== Series 14 ===
| Episode | First aired | Entrepreneur(s) | Company or product name | Money requested (£) | Equity offered (%) | Description of product | Dragons' reaction | Website | Fate |
|---|---|---|---|---|---|---|---|---|---|
| Episode 1 | 24 July 2016 | Ross Williams and Surlender Pendress | Writesize | 50,000 | 12.5 | Children's stationery pencils | Writesize's pitch failed due to the dragons' belief that the design of the pencils were too long and dislike of the colours produced. Dissolved by 2020. | | Dissolved (2020) |
| Episode 1 | 24 July 2016 | Mark Yewman | BigBoy Beanbag | 75,000 | 15 | Luxury machine washable beanbags | BigBoy Beanbag's pitch failed due to the dragons' belief that Yewman lacked drive to make the business a success and advised him not to rely on investment. Remains active. | | Active |
| Episode 2 | 31 July 2016 | Marco Hajikypri | Pro Gains | 125,000 | 5 | Nutrition meals for bodybuilders and athletes | Pro Gains' pitch failed due to the dragons citing Hajikypri's struggle to calculate the valuation and belief that he lacked the business sense required. Hajikypri has since admitted his regret in later rejecting a £90 million takeover bid from Coventry multi-millionaire Jojar Singh Dhinsa, in the belief that his business was worth £1 billion, which he blamed for Pro Gains eventual failure. Company is in liquidation as of 2017. | | Liquidation (2017) |
| Episode 2 | 31 July 2016 | David Overton | Splash Maps | 60,000 | 15 | Clothing designed as maps | Splash Maps' pitch failed due to the dragons' concerns over the cost of production and belief that the market was restricted. Remains active. | | Active |
| Episode 3 | 7 August 2016 | Sylvain Preumont | Mini You | 80,000 | 15 | Personalised model statues made using 3D-printing | Mini You's pitch failed due to the dragons struggling to see where the value of the business was. Remains active. | | Active |
| Episode 3 | 7 August 2016 | Anneka Chauhan and John Chauhan | i-stay (Falcon Bags) | 50,000 | 10 | Non-slip shoulder strap for bags and rucksacks | i-stay's pitch failed due to the dragons citing lack of profit to date and the Chauhan's struggle to calculate the amount of money they would actually need to invest. Remains active. | | Active |
| Episode 4 | 14 August 2016 | Stuart Mason | Spatap | 65,000 | 20 | Water-saving, eco-friendly, mobile tap and shower system | Spatap's pitch failed due to the dragons' belief that Mason's confusion in creating an RRP left the product lacking profitability and concerns over hygiene between the use of sharing. Company was later backed by the Australian government and remains active. | | Active |
| Episode 4 | 14 August 2016 | Faheem Badur | Peri'os (Direct Wholesale And Investment Group Limited) | 130,000 | 10 | Retail, restaurant franchise, sauce supply | Perios' pitch failed due to the dragons struggle to understand Badur's business model and disbelief he would make a net predicted £500,000 having only made £65,000 the previous year. Remains active. | | Active |
| Episode 4 | 14 August 2016 | Rachel De Caux and Paula Short | Beauty Boulevard | 65,000 | 5 | Glitter lipstick | Beauty Boulevard's pitch failed due to the dragons' belief the amount pitched for was premature and based on predicted future net profits and subsequently ridiculed the valuation. Remains active. | | Active |
| Episode 5 | 21 August 2016 | Tom Bell and Craig Bailey | FoamAroma UK | 80,000 | 15 | A redesigned takeaway coffee lid | FoamAroma UK's pitch failed due to the dragons' belief that the lids had little difference to standard coffee lids and disappointment that the duo were only offering investment in their UK branch and not their worldwide franchise. Company's UK listing was dissolved by 2017. Remains active in the U.S. | | Dissolved (2017) |
| Episode 5 | 21 August 2016 | Tina and Claire O'Brien | Little Belters | 45,000 | 15 | Singing tuition for children | Little Belters' pitch failed due to the dragons' belief that the business lacked commercial drive and could not foresee it expanding nationally. Remains active. | | Active |
| Episode 5 | 21 August 2016 | David Audsley | DAIO (Daily Appliance Intelligent Organiser) | 75,000 | 20 | Safety device for hair appliances | DAIO's pitch failed due to the dragons' concerns over the amount already invested by Audsley had resulted in a large amount of unsold stock, and worried that investment would plunge the company further into debt. Remains active. | | Active |
| Episode 6 | 28 August 2016 | Ranjit Sohal | Magi LED UK Ltd | 50,000 | 15 | A silicon housing device for LED lighting | Magi LED UK Ltd's pitch failed due to the dragons citing Sohal had falsely claimed the business manufactured its own products and were not convinced the product adequately replaced typical LED lightbulbs. Dissolved by 2022. | | Dissolved (2022) |
| Episode 6 | 28 August 2016 | John Bull | My Plinth | 50,000 | 25 | A stand device for mobile tablets | My Plinth's pitch failed due to the dragons frustration with Bull failing to reveal his gross margins to date and belief that he merely required advice on marketing than investment. Remains active. | | Active |
| Episode 7 | 4 September 2016 | Mustafa Mehmet | WellGel London | 70,000 | 35 | Chemical-free gel nail solution | Well Gel London's pitch failed due to the dragons' concerns over the authenticity of Mehmet's natural and non-toxic credentials as well as citing Mehmet only half of the company. Dissolved by 2018. | | Dissolved (2018) |
| Episode 7 | 4 September 2016 | Artur Napiorkowski and Denny Schenk | Retro-mixer | 45,000 | 15 | Adapter combining separate taps | Retro-mixer's pitch failed due to the dragons' disbelief that the product did not solve any common issues and would not sell to a mass market. Remains active. | | Active |
| Episode 7 | 4 September 2016 | Alison Grieve | G-Hold | 75,000 | 7.5 | Ergonomic hand holding device for drinks trays and tablets | G-Hold's pitch failed due to the dragons' disbelief that the device served a practical use. Company went to sign deals with two major retailers and remains active. | | Active |
| Episode 8 | 28 December 2016 | Alex Miles and Ini Weston | Quiet Rebellion | 75,000 | 10 | Socks brand | Quiet Rebellion's pitch failed due to the dragons' concerns over the amount of unsold stock and vivid designs on items covered by other items of clothing. Dissolved by 2023. | | Dissolved (2023) |
| Episode 8 | 28 December 2016 | Denis Ahmet and Tim Hamilton | Danceacise | 150,000 | 10 | Mats for dancing tuition | Danceacise's pitch failed due to the dragons citing low net profits and the lack of market research admitted by the duo, subsequently ridiculing the valuation. Dissolved by 2017. | | Dissolved (2017) |
| Episode 8 | 28 December 2016 | Ruth Lucas | The Rovernighter | 75,000 | 20 | Travelling bed cot for dogs | The Rovernighter's pitch failed due to the dragons citing a high RRP and lack of protection stopping dogs abandoning the cot. Remains active. | | Active |
| Episode 9 | 1 January 2017 | Roger Willems and Phil Stratford | DoorJammer | 80,000 | 15 | Portable personal security device | DoorJammer's pitch failed due to the dragons citing the duo did not need an investor as they were already netting $10 million a year. Company merged with the Penn Elcom Group by 2020. | | Sold (2020) |
| Episode 9 | 1 January 2017 | Sunil Kavuri | Great Grub (Go Gafoor Inc) | 80,000 | 5 | Halal sandwich food-to-go business | Great Grub's pitch failed due to the dragons citing low net profits, subsequently ridiculing the valuation, whilst also stating their concerns that the product lacked branding. Dissolved by 2021. | | Dissolved (2021) |
| Episode 10 | 8 January 2017 | Danny Savage | Igloo Disco (Golden Soul Leisure) | 80,000 | 20 | Alternative marquee hire | Igloo Disco's pitch failed due to the dragons' belief that the company had lost out on Savage's failure to spend more on advertising and felt the business was too niche for investment. Company dissolved by 2024. | | Dissolved (2024) |
| Episode 10 | 8 January 2017 | Jane Yates and Katie McDermott | Not Dogs | 75,000 | 15 | Vegetarian fast food | Not Dogs' pitch failed due to the dragons' belief that their marketing strategy was excluding those who were not vegetarian and concerns that the business was operating outside of their local food hall. Dissolved by 2021. | | Dissolved (2021) |
| Episode 10 | 8 January 2017 | Anna and Rowan Byrne | HulaFit | 80,000 | 15 | High energy hula-hoop fitness class | HulaFit's pitch failed due to the dragons citing the duo had not tried or tested the product and knew little about the market. Remains active. | | Active |
| Episode 10 | 8 January 2017 | John Nickels | HandiScoop | 45,000 | 15 | Grabbing aids for dog poo | HandiScoop's pitch failed due to the dragons citing Nickels did not own the patent and his struggle to calculate how many units he would have to sell to retain his licence. Remains active. | | Active |
| Episode 11 | 15 January 2017 | Gemma Cafferkey | Waxu | 50,000 | 10 | Intimate waxing | Waxu's pitch failed due to the dragons citing Cafferkey had a net profit that was over double the investment sought and encouraged her to test the product in a wider environment. Remains active. | | Active |
| Episode 11 | 15 January 2017 | Joanna Miller | Bespoke Verse | 50,000 | 20 | Rhyme-themed gifts | Bespoke Verse's pitch failed due to the dragons' belief that the company needed significantly more money to launch and that the business would stay niche. Remains active. | | Active |
| Episode 11 | 15 January 2017 | Simon Moore | The Sci- Tie | 80,000 | 20 | Biodegradable cable ties | The Sci- Tie's pitch failed due to the dragons' disbelief that the low production cost was genuine whilst also voicing concerns over Moore's revelation that he had developed various other products but had not made any money from them. Dissolved by 2021. | | Dissolved (2021) |
| Episode 12 | 29 January 2017 | Frances Cain | A Girl for All Time | 70,000 | 10 | Toy dolls with books | A Girl for All Time's pitch failed due to the dragons' concerns over the doll's appearance and cited a lack of usp. Remains active. | | Active |
| Episode 12 | 29 January 2017 | Damien Zannetou | Aenea Cosmetics | 100,000 | 10 | Beauty salon franchise | Aenea's pitch failed due to the dragons citing low net profits against the £1 million and the products being damaged on use by the dragons. Dissolved by 2024. | | Dissolved (2024) |
| Episode 13 | 5 February 2017 | Craig Knott | Patlock | 90,000 | 10 | Home security device for conservatory doors | Patlock's pitch failed due to the dragons citing Knott charged more for the product on his website than the retailer's and belief that he did not display enough passion for the product. Remains active. | | Active |
| Episode 13 | 5 February 2017 | Angela Sterling | Lingotot | 50,000 | 10 | Language classes for children | Lingotot's pitch failed due to the dragons citing Sterling's net profit claims did not add up and advised her not to progress with international expansion. Remains active. | | Active |
| Episode 13 | 5 February 2017 | Juma El-Awaisi and Anwar Almojarkesh | Braci | 50,000 | 20 | Exclusive rights to sell sound recognition products in the UK | Braci's pitch failed due to the dragons citing the duo owned another company in Denmark that owned all the intellectual property and developed the units and were not including it as part of the investment. Remains active. | | Active |
| Episode 14 | 12 February 2017 | Kevin Moore | Comb and Blade | 45,000 | 15 | Online men's grooming retailer | Comb and Blade's pitch failed due to the dragons' disbelief that Moore would exit his full-time job as a teacher to run the business whilst also citing low net profits. Dissolved by 2018. | | Dissolved (2018) |
| Episode 14 | 12 February 2017 | David Hastie | Nutrifiz Ltd | 75,000 | 10 | Effervescent health tablets | Nutrifiz's pitch failed due to the dragons’ distaste for the use of artificial sweeteners and citing low sales attributing to a lack of patenting. Dissolved by 2018. | | Dissolved (2018) |
| Episode 14 | 12 February 2017 | Alec Mills and Celia Pool | Sanitary Owl | N/A | N/A | Subscription service for recyclable menstruation products | Sanitary Owl's pitch failed due to the dragons citing the company could easily cut costs by speaking directly with the manufacturers to obtain broken products for repair and were not convinced that a subscription service suited the product. Terms not broadcast. Remains active. | | Active |
| Episode 14 | 12 February 2017 | Paul Jobin | Snugs Earphones (renamed Snugs Custom-Fit) | 80,000 | 5 | Custom fit earphones | Snugs' pitch failed due to the dragons citing a high production cost of £10,000 just for the scanning and felt Jobin's financial predictions as well as his roll-out model were flawed. Remains active. | | Active |
| Episode 15 | 19 February 2017 | Steven Reynolds | Micro Fitness | 100,000 | 15 | Fitness for children | Micro Fitness' pitch failed due to the dragons' disbelief in Reynolds financial projections and advised him expansion outside of Scotland was premature. Dissolved by 2019. | | Dissolved (2019) |
| Episode 15 | 19 February 2017 | Matthew Statham | Autoblaze | 150,000 | 15 | Wood-burning stove ignition system | Autoblaze's pitch failed due to the dragons citing a high rrp, low sales and subsequently ridiculed the valuation. Dissolved by 2018. | | Dissolved (2018) |
| Episode 15 | 19 February 2017 | Adam Stevenson | Ripped Luggage Ltd | 60,000 | 20 | Six-pack inspired luggage range | Ripped Luggage's pitch failed due to the dragons' concerns as to whether the cases would sell to a mass market and a high RRP. Dissolved by 2020. | | Dissolved (2020) |
| Episode 15 | 19 February 2017 | Falu Shah | Howdah Foods and Snacks | 100,000 | 17.5 | Indian foods and snacks | Howdah Snacks' pitch failed due to the dragons' belief that the product lacked a USP and concerns that the product was in an overcrowded market. Remains active. | | Active |
| Episode 16 | 26 February 2017 | Robert Hallmark | Gruhme | 75,000 | 15 | Men's grooming products | Gruhme's pitch failed due to the dragons' dislike of the aroma presented and felt the marketplace to be overcrowded for investment. Remains active. | | Active |
| Episode 16 | 26 February 2017 | Peter Georgiou | Supper Deliveries | 100,000 | 10 | On-demand high-end food delivery | Supper's pitch failed due to the dragons' belief that the company would need significantly more money to launch and citing that Michelin star restaurants Georgiou was targeting would not allow food delivery considering the quality of service and taste. Dissolved by 2024. | | Dissolved (2024) |
| Episode 16 | 26 February 2017 | Ashley and Kate Jones | Selwyn's Seafood | 70,000 | 20 | Seaweed snacks | Selwyn's pitch failed due to the dragons' concerns over the costs of rent the Jones' were paying when the factory only operated for three days a month, as well as considering the market to be niche. Remains active. | | Active |

=== Series 15 ===
| Episode | First aired | Entrepreneur(s) | Company or product name | Money requested (£) | Equity offered (%) | Description of product | Dragons' reaction | Website | Fate |
|---|---|---|---|---|---|---|---|---|---|
| Episode 1 | 20 August 2017 | Nilesh Pandit | Play Five A Side Ltd | 100,000 | 12.5 | Sports pitch hire | Play Five A Side's pitch failed due to the dragons citing Pandit's alleged net profits were false, suggesting he had made a loss. Remains active. | | Active |
| Episode 1 | 20 August 2017 | Jason Hamlyn | Bikeaway | 600,000 | 50 | Protection for bike lockers and stands | Bikeaway's pitch failed due to Hamlyn's revelation that his plans for spending the investment were provisional and failing to justify the valuation. Remains active. | | Active |
| Episode 2 | 27 August 2017 | Ben and Harry Tucker | Plane Industries (Fallen Furniture Ltd) | 80,000 | 10 | Luxury furniture, stationery and luggage aircraft scraps | Plane Industries' pitch failed due to the dragons' concerns over the Tuckers' business strategy and concerns over constant net losses following four years of trading. Remains active. | | Active |
| Episode 2 | 27 August 2017 | Fenna Leake and William Pryor | Bookbarn International Limited | 100,000 | 10 | Somerset-based books | Bookbarn International Limited's pitch failed due to the dragons citing large outstanding debts and feared the investment would see a long repayment structure. Company in liquidation as of 2022. | | Liquidation (2022) |
| Episode 3 | 3 September 2017 | Jonathan Brook and Hayley Hollonds | Text A Potato | 40,000 | 30 | Vegetable gift service | Text A Potato's pitch failed due to the dragons' disbelief that the business would appeal to a mass market. Remains active. | | Active |
| Episode 3 | 27 August 2017 | Rayeesa Asghar-Sandys | Spiced by Rayeesa | 75,000 | 12 | Fresh frozen curry sauce | Spiced by Rayeesa's pitch failed due to the dragons citing a lack of patenting and a crowded marketplace. Company in liquidation as of 2024. | | Liquidation (2024) |
| Episode 3 | 3 September 2017 | Michael Gormley | Go Bubble Ltd | 200,000 | 5 | Champagne preserving bottle tops | Go Bubble's pitch failed due to the dragons citing Gormley only owned 10% of the business and were unconvinced of his projected sales. Dissolved by 2025. | N/A | Dissolved (2025) |
| Episode 4 | 10 September 2017 | Phil Daneshyar | Thirsti Ltd | 65,000 | 10 | Tracking device that reminds people how much they have had to drink throughout the day | Thirsti's pitch failed due to the dragons ridiculing low profit margin and the impracticality of the product. Dissolved by 2020. | N/A | Dissolved (2020) |
| Episode 4 | 10 September 2017 | Derek Payne and Neville Howes | Dubble Bubble Limited | 150,000 | 15 | Environmentally friendly packaging kit | Dubble Bubble's pitch failed due to Jenny Campbell's offer depending on securing a second Dragon, and she withdrew after no other Dragon agreed to invest. Dissolved by 2026. | N/A | Dissolved (2026) |
| Episode 5 | 24 September 2017 | Maria Magembe and Hellen Lawuo-Meena | Daughter Of The Soil Skincare | 60,000 | 10 | Shea-based and sesame-based skincare products | Daughter Of The Soil Skincare's pitch failed due to the dragons citing low sales despite £160,000 investment which the dragons suggested was misused on patenting and trademarking. Remains active. | | Active |
| Episode 5 | 24 September 2017 | Mark Walsh | KwizzBit | 80,000 | 10 | Cloud-based quiz trivia game | KwizzBit's pitch failed due to the dragons' concerns that the game lacked a USP and that pubs would pay to use it. Remains active. | | Active |
| Episode 6 | 1 October 2017 | Charles Burr and Jerry Krylov | Corner (Train With Corner) | 50,000 | 5 | App based boxing performance tracker | Corner's pitch failed due to the dragons citing the intellectual property was owned by a 3rd party and concerns over predicted net losses based on the size of the UK market. Remains active. | | Active |
| Episode 6 | 1 October 2017 | Erika Nilsson-Humphrey | Dappad | 75,000 | 7.5 | Online personal styling service for men | Dappad's pitch failed due to the dragons citing a high return rate of the clothes she had sold and felt the marketplace to be overcrowded. Dissolved by 2025. | | Dissolved (2025) |
| Episode 7 | 8 October 2017 | Tom Putnam and Mark Jenner | BeeLine | 100,000 | 2.5 | App based navigation devices for cyclists | BeeLine's pitch failed due to the dragons citing £560,000 of investment had already been spent to get the product to this stage and concerns over the company's finance structure. Remains active. | | Active |
| Episode 7 | 8 October 2017 | Lara Sengupta | CorkYogis | 50,000 | 15 | Luxury cork yoga mats | CorkYogis' pitch failed due to the dragons confusion over whether Sengupta was donating all profits to charity and belief that the business was too small for investment. Company sold in 2023. Remains active. | | Sold (2023) |
| Episode 7 | 8 October 2017 | Alan Pegram | Global Display | 90,000 | 10 | Eco-friendly mannequin displays | Global Display's pitch failed due to the dragons' concerns over growing preference of online shopping and citing Pegram owned a larger company which he integrates but was not offering as part of the investment. UK company dissolved by 2022 but continues to trade in South Africa. | | Dissolved (2022) |
| Episode 8 | 15 October 2017 | Nigel Mills | TEC-Angel | 90,000 | 12% | Wireless monitoring and alert system | TEC-Angel's pitch failed due to the dragons citing technical flaws and belief that Mills wanted an investor to run the company as opposed to invest. Company was sold to the British Numusmatic Trade Association in 2020. | | Sold (2020) |
| Episode 8 | 15 October 2017 | Nigel Bamford | Waterblade | 85,000 | 10 | Water-saving attachment for taps | Waterblade's pitch failed due to the dragons citing low sales and concerns that the company's active trials would not lead to major orders. Remains active. | | Active |
| Episode 9 | 15 October 2017 | Sophia Wu | YHIM | N/A | N/A | Menswear pocket squares and socks | YHIM's pitch failed due to the dragons' dislike of the thick fabric material and cited low sales against her £700,000 valuation. Terms not broadcast. Remains active. | | Active |
| Episode 9 | 26 December 2017 | Emma Blower and Nick Stacey | Magic Santa Letters | 75,000 | N/A | Online personalised Christmas messages | Magic Santa Letter's pitch failed due to the dragons' concerns that the business model would only operate one season a year and lacked licensing to feature other company's products. Terms of equity not broadcast. Dissolved by 2018. | | Dissolved (2018) |
| Episode 9 | 26 December 2017 | Jack Hanauer | Trix | 50,000 | 20 | Word guessing board game | Trix's pitch failed due to the dragons citing Hanauer had already sold the international rights to the game and were unconvinced regarding the branding. | | N/A |
| Episode 9 | 26 December 2017 | Catherine Zielinski and Paul Lawson | Simplyseedz | 40,000 | 20 | Natural breakfast and snacking products | Simplyseedz's pitch failed due to the dragons citing high net losses and low demand. Remains active. | | Active |
| Episode 10 | 14 January 2018 | Colleen Wong | Techsixtyfour (My Gator Watch) | 100,000 | 5 | GPS watch and wristband for children | Techsixtyfour's pitch failed due to the dragons citing Wong did not own the patent and ridiculed her valuation based on low sales. Remains active. | | Liquidation (2024) |
| Episode 11 | 28 January 2018 | Dr Asif Munaf | Date Smoothie | 50,000 | 10 | Smoothie with a side of nuts and seeds | Date Smoothie's pitch failed due to the dragons' belief that the branding was not clear enough as well as citing Munaf's valuation being based on potential as opposed to his accounts. Remains active. | | Active |
| Episode 11 | 28 January 2018 | Daniel Edwards | Parkour Generations | 150,000 | 5 | Exercise training classes | Parkour Generations' pitch failed due to the dragons citing the company had no contracts in place and concerns over the restricted market Edwards was targeting. Remains active. | | Active |
| Episode 11 | 28 January 2018 | Gemma Judd | Sprayaway UK | 50,000 | N/A | Tanning colour accessories | Sprayaway UK's pitch failed due to the dragons citing low sales and concerns over the market being small. The equity requested was not broadcast. Dissolved by 2018. | | Dissolved (2018) |
| Episode 12 | 4 February 2018 | Lucy Cox and Lerin Clare | Halto (Julie Rocks Limited) | 50,000 | 15 | Device aiding halterneck tops | Halto's pitch failed due to the dragons' belief that the design was easily replicated and the market to be restricted. Remains active. | | Active |
| Episode 13 | 11 February 2018 | Lee Dein | Magic Link Handwriting | 60,000 | 10 | Hand-writing aid workbooks | Magic Link font and Handwriting Programme's pitch failed due to the dragons' concerns that the product lacked uniqueness against technology goliaths and cited the ease of replicability with another font. Remains active. | | Active |
| Episode 14 | 18 February 2018 | Mike Fisher and Shane Monaghan | Gravity Life | 25,000 | 10% | Orthopedic posture keystone | Gravity Life's pitch failed due to the dragons citing the product lacked intellectual property and lacked clinical research. Remains active. | | Active |

=== Series 16 ===
| Episode | First aired | Entrepreneur(s) | Company or product name | Money requested (£) | Equity offered (%) | Description of product | Dragons' reaction | Website | Fate |
|---|---|---|---|---|---|---|---|---|---|
| Episode 1 | 12 August 2018 | Matt Lee | Play Me The Song | 300,000 | 30 | Musician hiring website | Play Me The Song's pitch failed due to the dragons' concerns that the process was easily replicated and would not produce a return worthy of investment. Company appears to have been dissolved. | | N/A |
| Episode 2 | 19 August 2018 | Simon and Toby Woods | Funky Seal Wetsuits | 50,000 | 25 | Coloured and patterned wetsuits | Funky Seal Wetsuits' pitch failed due to the dragons' concerns that the duo did not understand the market and. Dissolved by 2021. | | Dissolved (2021) |
| Episode 2 | 19 August 2018 | Robel Iyassu | Boun Beans | 75,000 | 7.5 | Hand roasted coffee beans | Boun Beans' pitch failed due to the dragons' concerns over Iyassu's ambitions to launch a shop in central London whilst accumulating setup costs, and citing a low turnover not justifying his valuation. Remains active. | | Active |
| Episode 3 | 26 August 2018 | Alex Savelli and Finn Lagun | Pasta Evangelists | 75,000 | 2.5 | Fresh pasta delivery service | Pasta Evangelists' pitch failed due to the dragons' concerns over the cost of the service and ridiculing the valuation. Company was sold in 2021 for £40 million. | | Sold (2021) |
| Episode 3 | 26 August 2018 | Terry Dempsey | Urban Bait | 150,000 | 15 | Carp fishing baits | Urban Bait's pitch failed due to the dragons' concerns over the valuation and the length of time required for the investment to be returned. Company was sold in 2022. | | Sold (2022) |
| Episode 4 | 2 September 2018 | Francesco Boni, Lise Arlot and Christian Bellanca | Feral Horses | 50,000 | 2 | Online platform for buying and trading shares in art | Feral Horses' pitch failed due to the dragons citing the company had not turned a profit since its launch and the trio's lack of experience in the sector and valuing the art placed. Dissolved by 2022. | | Dissolved (2022) |
| Episode 4 | 2 September 2018 | Barbara Jones and Eileen Sutherland | Straw works | 50,000 | 10 | Buildings designed with natural materials | Straw Works' pitch failed due to the dragons' concerns that the houses were not mortgageable and the company building the houses was not included in the investment offer. Company sold in 2023. Remains active. | | Sold (2023) |
| Episode 5 | 9 September 2018 | David and Max Gattie | DR21: Draft Reducing Air Venilations | 40,000 | 20 | Draft reducing air ventilation for woodburners and gas appliances | DR21's pitch failed due to the dragons citing a low market for the product and believed that the amount requested was futile in launching the business. Remains active. | | Active |
| Episode 6 | 16 September 2018 | Andrew Eversden | Join The Pipe UK | 100,000 | 5 | Tap water fountains | Join The Pipe UK's pitch failed due to the dragons citing Eversden did not own the parent company of the product and had only received orders of £20,000. Company's UK branch was dissolved by 2019, but remains active in the Netherlands. | | Active |
| Episode 7 | 4 November 2018 | Matthew and Sade Howell | Jollof Box | 75,000 | 15 | Gourmet West African cuisines | Jollof Box's pitch failed due to the dragons' concerns over the business operating just from one kitchen and lack of clarity on the plans of expansion. Remains active. | | Active |
| Episode 8 | 11 November 2018 | Nicola Wood | Easiweft | 80,000 | 25 | Hair-extension holders | Easiweft's pitch failed due to the dragons citing Wood's intention to use half of the investment to buy out another investor, subsequently misvaluing her pitch, whilst also struggling to calculate the size of the market. Remains active. | | Active |
| Episode 9 | 25 November 2018 | Katherine Swift | OMG Tea | 50,000 | 7 | Powdered green tea supplements and drinks | OMG Tea's pitch failed due to the dragons' concerns over the size of the market and possible misleading information over Swift's claim that the product provided a longer life-span for cancer patients. Remains active. | | Active |
| Episode 9 | 25 November 2018 | Robert Young and Kim Nimsgern | RCG Hair Ltd (Click n Curl) | 60,000 | 20 | Hair curling brushes and blow-dryers | RCG Hair's pitch failed due to the dragons' concerns over the sales performance of the U.S. umbrella company and the size of the market. The UK company was dissolved by 2020, however remains active in the U.S. | | Dissolved (2020) |
| Episode 10 | 2 December 2018 | Elizabeth Hodcroft | The Sweet Beet | 70,000 | 20 | Texas inspired food sauces | The Sweet Beet's pitch failed due to the dragons' concerns over the high levels of sugar in the products and were overall unimpressed with the taste. Dissolved by 2020. | | Dissolved (2020) |
| Episode 10 | 2 December 2018 | Peter Smith | Besos Food and Drinks | 100,000 | 15 | Non-dairy liquors, chocolates and milka | Besos Food and Drinks' pitch failed due to the dragons' concerns over the branding. Dissolved by 2023. | | Dissolved (2023) |
| Episode 11 | 23 December 2018 | Ryan Wach | Easy Treezy Christmas Tree Stand | 50,000 | 5 | Fitting apt for Christmas trees | Ryan Walk's pitch failed due to the dragons' belief that the product did not work adequately and were concerned over the business being seasonal. | | N/A |
| Episode 12 | 6 January 2019 | Darren Markwick, Liam Stamp and Brian Wilcox | Parcel Boxes Installed | 40,000 | 15 | Anti-theft parcel delivery boxes | Parcel Boxes’ pitch failed due to the dragons’ dislike of the design and citing low financial projections. Remains active. | | Active |
| Episode 12 | 6 January 2019 | Christine and Ross Hunter | Whiskey Frames | 50,000 | 15 | Picture frames made from recycled whiskey barrels | Whiskey Frames' pitch failed due to the dragons citing low financial forecasts and citing the business currently had no working capital. Remains active. | | Active |
| Episode 13 | 13 January 2019 | Melissa Snover | The Magic Candy Factory | 80,000 | 2 | 3D printing to create custom candy items | The Magic Candy Factory's pitch failed due to the dragons citing Shover only held a 10% share in the company as well as concerns over the branding. Remains active. | | Active |
| Episode 13 | 13 January 2019 | Rocky Arkwright | Mi Mam's Yorkshire pies | 75,000 | 35 | Artisan pie creations | Mi Mam's Yorkshire pies' pitch failed due to the dragons' concerns over whether Arkwright could expand the franchise nationally. Dissolved by 2024. | | Dissolved (2024) |
| Episode 14 | 27 January 2019 | Brian Irvine | Firemizer | 80,000 | 16 | Eco-friendly fire burning alternative | Firemizer's pitch failed due to the dragons citing a large amount of money had already been spent on repackaging and rebranding based on consumer feedback, whilst also noting the production of the material was not eco-friendly. Remains active. | | Active |
| Episode 15 | 3 February 2019 | Jerome Jacob | Phrooti Water | 75,000 | 15 | Fruit flavoured water bottles | Phrooti Water's pitch failed due to the dragons' belief that Jacob's financial expectations were overly optimistic and distaste for some of the flavours taste. Dissolved by 2019. | | Dissolved (2019) |
| Episode 15 | 3 February 2019 | Anthonissa Mogger | Hypnobirthing Midwife | 26,000 | 10 | Exercises to prepare for water births | Hypnobirthing's pitch failed due to the dragons' concerns that the business was at too early a stage for investment. Dissolved by 2019. | | Dissolved (2019) |
| Episode 15 | 3 February 2019 | Medwin Culmer and Preyanka Clark Prakash | Bloomtown | 70,000 | 20 | Palm oil-free skincare | Bloomtown's pitch failed due to the dragons citing the packaging lacked information on the product's palm-free credentials and deemed it overall low-quality. Remains active. | | Active |

=== Series 17 ===
| Episode | First aired | Entrepreneur(s) | Company or product name | Money requested (£) | Equity offered (%) | Description of product | Dragons' reaction | Website | Fate |
|---|---|---|---|---|---|---|---|---|---|
| Episode 1 | 11 August 2019 | Paul Stanley | Cloven Hoof Rum | 50,000 | 5 | Imported rum from Guyana & Trinidad | Cloven Hoof Rum's pitch failed due to the dragons anger at Stanley's wish for the name of a dragon to simply market the product and citing current investors had been given better terms. Remains active. | | Active |
| Episode 1 | 11 August 2019 | Alister Bell | Irish Black Butter | N/A | N/A | Food spread made from bramley apples, brandy, spices and ciders | Irish Black Butter's pitch failed due to the dragons citing high levels of sugar in the product and felt Bell lacked business acumen. Remains active. | | Active |
| Episode 2 | 18 August 2019 | Martyn Gould | Yboo | 250,000 | 2.5 | App tracking usage of data to offer phone deals | Yboot's pitch failed due to the dragons citing the app did not offer feedback on the reliability of the coverage based in the area the customer is based as well as ridiculing his £10 million valuation, the highest valuation pitched as of 2022, which he based on mis-understandings of a previous investment offer. Dissolved by 2019. | | Dissolved (2020) |
| Episode 2 | 18 August 2019 | Asam Hussain | Alissa Sports | N/A | N/A | Disposable sauna suits | Alissa Sports' pitch failed due to the dragons citing the ease of replica and concerns over the product's unlikelyhood of being patentable. Terms not broadcast. Dissolved by 2024. | | Dissolved (2024) |
| Episode 3 | 25 August 2019 | Maxim Gelmann | Stroodles - Pasta Straws | 40,000 | 5 | Edible pasta straws | Stroodles ' pitch failed due to the dragons' disbelief that Gelmann would reach his predicted profits within one year and his knowledge on eco-friendly credentials. Remains active. | | Active |
| Episode 3 | 25 August 2019 | Alison Gibb | The Interior Design Toolkit | N/A | N/A | Cards inspiring re-decoration | The Interior Design Toolkit's pitch failed due to the dragons citing low sales and belief that Gibb lacked experience in running the company. Terms not broadcast. Dissolved by 2021. | | Dissolved (2021) |
| Episode 3 | 25 August 2019 | Darren Morris | GloRide | 100,000 | 20 | Overall fitting light for bicycles | GloRide's pitch failed due to the dragons citing a high production cost and ease of replication. Remains active. | | Active |
| Episode 4 | 1 September 2019 | Lucinder O'Connor | Clothes Doctor | 70,000 | 3 | Repairs, altercations and restorations of clothing | Clothes Doctor's pitch failed due to the dragons citing a high net loss and lack of unique selling points. Remains active. | | Active |
| Episode 4 | 1 September 2019 | Adrian Brockless | Bespoke Classical Music | 10,000 | 5 | Classical music composed, performed and recorded for special occasions | Bespoke Classical Music's pitch failed due to the dragons' belief that the business lacked a target audience and would not succeed as a business. | | N/A |
| Episode 4 | 1 September 2019 | Michelle Turnbull | Barking Bakery | 75,000 | 15 | Cakes and treats for dogs | Barking Bakery's pitch failed due to the dragons citing Turnbull was unsure of her gross and net profits to date and lacked knowledge on competition in the market. Remains active. | | Active |
| Episode 5 | 8 September 2019 | Daniel and Ben Ristmer | Crane Drinks | 80,000 | 2 | Vegan and gluten free cranberry ciders and liqueurs | Crane Drinks' pitch failed due to the dragons citing high net losses and lacked a unique selling point without the product having a heritage story on the ingredient of cranberry. Remains active. | | Active |
| Episode 5 | 8 September 2019 | John Walsh | N/A | N/A | N/A | Poems for special occasions | John Walsh's pitch failed due to the dragons' belief that the service would not survive as a business. Company name nor terms broadcast. | N/A | N/A |
| Episode 5 | 8 September 2019 | Katherine Austin | Bee Bee Wraps | 60,000 | 10 | Eco-friendly food wraps made from organic cotton and bee wax | 'Bee Bee Wraps' pitch failed due to the dragons' concerns over the plastic making food smell and ease of replication. Dissolved by 2024. | | Dissolved (2024) |
| Episode 6 | 15 September 2019 | Philip Neale | Snoozle | 50,000 | 10 | App rewarding users for non-phone usage with discount vouchers | Snoozle's pitch failed due to the dragons citing lack of proof of concept and disbelief the company would appeal to subscribers. Dissolved by 2022. | N/A | Dissolved (2022) |
| Episode 6 | 15 September 2019 | Ivonnne Morrison | Good Nude Food | 50,000 | 10 | Sauerkraut health foods | Good Nude Food's pitch failed due to the dragons' disbelief that Morrison's business model would survive in supermarket shelves as well as citing a high valuation based on a low turnover. Remains active. | | Active |
| Episode 6 | 15 September 2019 | Fraser McIntyre and Sophie Whittaker | The Biscuit Baron | N/A | N/A | Biscuit subscription boxes | The Biscuit Baron's pitch failed due to the dragons citing a low number of subscribers and belief that the business was not ready for investment. Terms not broadcast. Remains active. | | Active |
| Episode 6 | 15 September 2019 | Nicholas Bennett | Festival Bag | 75,000 | 20 | Camping tent rental service | Festival Bag's pitch failed due to the dragons' concerns over the costs of the service offering deliveries after usage and maintaining quality after single usage. Dissolved by 2024. | | Dissolved (2024) |
| Episode 7 | 22 September 2019 | Sally Mansfield | Manners London | 75,000 | 20 | One size fits all female clothes range | Manners London's pitch failed due to the dragons' concerns over the product being in a crowded market and felt Mansfield would need more money to launch. Remains active. | | Active |
| Episode 7 | 22 September 2019 | Jack Bowstock and Thomas Kitchen-Dunn | Lamb2Ewe | 30,000 | 15 | Online meat deliveries | Lamb2Ewe's pitch failed due to the dragons' concerns over the company's scalability and ability to meet demands of sales. Remains active. | | Active |
| Episode 8 | 22 December 2019 | Mary Ann Dujardin | Rethink Wrap | 40,000 | 25 | Reusable wrapping paper | Rethink Wrap's pitch failed due to the dragons' belief that the business model was not unique and advised Dujardin to approach retailers directly. Remains active. | | N/A |
| Episode 8 | 22 December 2019 | William Sorrell | Clarendon Games | N/A | N/A | Board and card games | Clarendon Games' pitch failed due to the dragons' concern that the market was in an over-crowded market and cited inaccuracies over the games being suitable for all ages. Terms not broadcast. Remains active. | | Active |
| Episode 8 | 22 December 2019 | Joshua Turner | Stand4Socks | 60,000 | 7.5 | Antibacterial socks, donating to homeless for every pair sold | Stand4Socks' pitch failed due to the dragons citing no major orders had been placed and disbelief that Turner would achieve his forecasts having failed to sell £80,000 worth of stock. Remains active. | | Active |
| Episode 9 | 8 March 2020 | Trish Daswaney | Kohl Creatives | 60,000 | 20 | Ergonomic make-up brushes | Kohl Creatives' pitch failed due to the dragons citing Daswaney's full-time employment elsewhere would not allow sufficient time for her to run the business and her inaccuracies in projecting the numbers in the UK market size. Dissolved by 2023. | | Dissolved (2023) |
| Episode 9 | 8 March 2020 | Charlotte and Christopher Wright | Groomi | N/A | N/A | Animal grooming brush | Groomi's pitch failed due to the dragons' concerns that the RRP was too high and that the patent was applied for after the product was launched. Remains active. | | Active |
| Episode 9 | 8 March 2020 | Simon Bourne | Hand Dye Shoe Company | 70,000 | 15 | Custom designed leather shoes | Hand Dye Shoe Company's pitch failed due to the dragons citing not all customers had in-person appointments and the shoes were not custom made in the uk as advertised. Dissolved by 2025. | | Dissolved (2025) |
| Episode 10 | 15 March 2020 | Mariette Ohuimumwen | Cat Face Hair (Mariette Immaculate Ltd) | 80,000 | 10 | Hair, style and fashion products | Cat Face Hair's pitch failed due to the dragons' belief that the company was not ready for investment following concerns that Mariette was not more than an artisan. Dissolved by 2019, however the company appears to continue trading through Instagram. | | Dissolved (2018) |
| Episode 10 | 15 March 2020 | Lee Gaskell | Panache | N/A | N/A | Flavoured gin range | Panache's pitch failed due to the dragons citing their distaste of unpopular sugar additives in the product and concerns over Gaskell's employment elsewhere not allowing the company to progress. Terms not broadcast. Remains active. | | Active |
| Episode 10 | 15 March 2020 | James Asquith | Cheesecake Emporiyum | 70,000 | 33 | Cheesecake franchise | Cheesecake Emporium's pitch failed due to the dragons citing a lack of healthy ingredients and continued annual declines in net profits. Dissolved by 2025. | | Dissolved (2025) |
| Episode 11 | 22 March 2020 | Simon Wild | Chimella | 50,000 | 10 | Umbrella catching all falling debris | Chimella's pitch failed due to the dragons citing low sales and belief that the market was not wide enough for investment. Remains active. | | Active |
| Episode 11 | 22 March 2020 | Tina Blackwill | Pom Pom Dance | 25,000 | 10 | Dance classes for care homes | Pom Pom's pitch failed due to the dragons citing low net profits and lacked patent protection. | N/A | N/A |
| Episode 12 | 29 March 2020 | Genevieve Waxman | Raw Bake Station | 50,000 | 10 | Vegan chocolates and treats | Raw Bake Station's pitch failed due to the dragons' concerns that some products had short-term expiry dates and mixed feedback from supermarkets. Remains active. | | Active |
| Episode 12 | 29 March 2020 | Dr Sukhdeep Murbay | Dr M's Oral Brush | N/A | N/A | Recyclable detachable toothbrush heads | Dr M's Oral Brush's pitch failed due to the dragons' concerns that the product was overpriced and cited his claims on recyclability were no different to those currently on the market. Terms not broadcast. Remains active. | | Active |
| Episode 12 | 29 March 2020 | Gemma Zinyama and Shiraz Ahmed | Dripboost | 25,000 | 15 | Mobile IV vitamin therapy and vitamins injection service | Dripboost's pitch failed due to the dragons' concerns over the cost of the service and potential medical negligence. Remains active. | | Active |
| Episode 13 | 5 April 2020 | Kate Bell (businesswoman) | Zipusin | 50,000 | 5 | Jacket expander panel for pregnant women and baby carriers | Zipusin's pitch failed due to the dragons citing an inflated valuation with large debt incurred and deemed the investment high-risk. Remains active. | | Active |
| Episode 14 | 12 April 2020 | Razan Alsous and Ragi Sandook | Yorkshire Dama Cheese (Squeeky Cheese) | 100,000 | 10 | Yorkshire cheese selections | Yorkshire Dama Cheese 's pitch failed due to the dragons citing the company's desire not to outsource production as well as ridiculing the valuation on a net profit of £25,000. Remains active. | | Active |
| Episode 14 | 12 April 2020 | Martin Grimer and Shaun Jones | Punkbox | 40,000 | 15 | Packaging converted into children's decorations | Punkbox's pitch failed due to the dragons' concerns that the service was adding to the issue of waste pollution and whilst advising that the business model needed to be creating the boxes themselves as opposed to suggesting designs for customers. Dissolved by 2021. | | Dissolved (2021) |
| Episode 14 | 12 April 2020 | Davids Hyams | Talkies | 100,000 | 12.5 | Electronic greeting cards | Talkies' pitch failed due to the dragons citing basic designs for the greeting cards and Hyams struggling to calculate his profit predictions. Remains active. | | Active |
| Episode 14 | 12 April 2020 | Nancy Zeffman and Eileen Willett | Cucumber Clothing | 50,000 | 10 | Cooling clothing for females | Cucumber Clothing's pitch failed due to the dragons' concerns over the clothing designs and the RRP. Dissolved by 2024. | | Dissolved (2024) |

=== Series 18 ===
| Episode | First aired | Entrepreneur(s) | Company or product name | Money requested (£) | Equity offered (%) | Description of product | Dragons' reaction | Website | Fate |
|---|---|---|---|---|---|---|---|---|---|
| Episode 1 | 1 April 2021 | Adrian Potter | Icebloc | N/A | N/A | Eco-friendly alternative drinking straw preventing overflow of ice | Icebloc's pitch failed due to the dragons' concern that the product encouraged the use of straws and would increase pollution of waste. The terms of money and equity requested were not broadcast. Remains active. | | Active |
| Episode 1 | 1 April 2021 | Antoine Messiou | Sunclipa | 40,000 | 20 | Anti-blinding sunglasses for tennis players | Sunclipa's pitch failed due to the dragons citing the product blocked areas of vision in normal light and felt the product was better suited being built into sunglasses as opposed to an attachment. Remains active. | | Active |
| Episode 2 | 8 April 2021 | Charlie Craig and Jason Clarke | Gen!us Brewing | 120,000 | 4 | Light craft lager brand | Gen!us Brewing's pitch failed due to the dragons citing low sales to date and had already sold 17% of the company for over £300,000, leaving the pitched valuation inaccurate. Remains active. | | Active |
| Episode 2 | 8 April 2021 | Tim Mount | Manmower | N/A | N/A | Grooming aid for beards with design based on lawn-mowers | Manmower's pitch failed due to the dragons citing difficulty in using the product and felt Mount lacked passion for the business. Terms not broadcast. Dissolved by 2021. | | Dissolved (2021) |
| Episode 2 | 8 April 2021 | Gina and Hawaa | Uunn | 70,000 | 2.6 | Lens attachment displaying outstanding plaque on teeth | Uunn's pitch failed due to the dragons citing the company's valuation as over-inflated and cheaper substitutes were already on the market. Remains active. | | Active |
| Episode 3 | 15 April 2021 | Paul Robinson | WangerFlange | 50,000 | 25 | Multi-angle construction brackets | Wanger Flange's pitch failed due to the dragons citing it required further testing before it could be used in all structures and felt the business was not ready for investment. | | Active |
| Episode 3 | 15 April 2021 | Scott and David Borthwick | Double Trouble Drinks | N/A | N/A | Darts themed alcoholic drinks range | Double Trouble Drinks' pitch failed due to the dragons citing low margins and a high cost of production. Terms not broadcast. Dissolved by 2022. | | Dissolved (2022) |
| Episode 4 | 22 April 2021 | Sandeep Mudhar | Family Secret | 100,000 | 10 | Asian snacks and cooking ingredients | Family Secret's pitch failed due to the dragons' concern over the branding and felt under-whelmed with Mudhar's vision for the business. Remains active. | | Active |
| Episode 4 | 22 April 2021 | Natalie Lea and Katherine Warburton | Puffin Box | N/A | N/A | Socially distanced nightclub | Puffinbox's pitch failed due to the dragons' concern over how much money the business would make by limiting the number of people inside and lacking longevity. Terms not broadcast. Dissolved by 2022. | | Dissolved (2022) |
| Episode 5 | 29 April 2021 | Steven Warren and Andy Wilson | Songhive | 150,000 | 15 | Social media app for sharing musical experiences | Songhive's pitch failed due to the dragons citing a lack of notable musician's using the app to acknowledge reviews and suggesting the app would cost millions of pounds to gain substantial reviews. Dissolved by 2022. | | Dissolved (2022) |
| Episode 6 | 6 May 2021 | Kate and Graham Durracot | Microbarbox | 90,000 | 7.5 | Alcohol gift box service | Microbarbox's pitch failed due to the dragons citing the cost of buying the bottles individually was cheaper and easily replicated. Remains active. | | Active |
| Episode 6 | 6 May 2021 | Michael Beard | Lofto Mattic | 96,000 | 5 | Automated electric loft ladder | Lofto Mattic's pitch failed due to the dragons’ concern over Beard's valuation following a lack of profit. Company dissolved by 2022. | | Dissolved (2022) |
| Episode 7 | 13 May 2021 | Shaun McBrearty | Form-a-light | 60,000 | 20 | Motorised temporary remote control lighting | Form-a-light's pitch failed due to the dragons citing the patent did not cover areas already on the market and low sales. Remains active. | | Active |
| Episode 7 | 13 May 2021 | Yingjun Chen and Afeez Kolawole-Alade | E-Rides | N/A | N/A | Electric scooters and unicycles | E-Ride's pitch failed due to the dragons citing the business was an e-commerce distributor as opposed to a unique brand. Terms not broadcast. Remains active. | | Active |
| Episode 8 | 20 May 2021 | Jamie and Gemma Pound | UK Sniffer Dogs | 70,000 | 15 | Scent detection dog training | UK Sniffer Dogs pitch failed due to the dragons citing lack of charges for customers producing low profits and felt the market was not wide-enough for investment. Remains active. | | Active |
| Episode 8 | 20 May 2021 | Trystan Holtbrook | Bubblebog | N/A | N/A | Natural toilet in-built cleaning froth | Bubblebog's pitch failed due to the dragons citing the product's noise as a nuisance and extra effort in one holding the flusher for longer. Terms not broadcast. Remains active. | | Active |
| Episode 9 | 27 May 2021 | Leanne Holder and Jacob Leaver | Vitamin Coffee | 50,000 | 33.3 | Vitamin infused coffee | Vitamin Coffee's pitch failed due to the dragons citing the entrepreneurs had purchased the company as supposed to start it whilst also stating health concerns. Dissolved by 2018. | | Dissolved (2018) |
| Episode 9 | 27 May 2021 | Sophie James | Top to Tail Salons | N/A | N/A | Hair-resistant clothing line for pet care professionals | Top to Tail Salons' pitch failed due to the dragons citing high production costs and believing the market to be narrow for investment. Terms not broadcast. Dissolved by 2022. | | Dissolved (2022) |
| Episode 10 | 3 June 2021 | Deborah Lockhart | Honest Blends (Naked & Noble) | 50,000 | 10 | Plant-based food and health-care products | Honest Blends' pitch failed due to the dragons citing conflicts with the brand name and struggled to understand Lockhart's business model. Company has since been renamed and remains active. | | Active |
| Episode 10 | 3 June 2021 | Robert Simpson | Single Handed | 50,000 | 10 | Rotatable serving trays | Single Handed's pitch failed due to the dragons managing to easily break the product whilst demonstrating and believing it was easily replicated. Remains active. | | Active |
| Episode 10 | 3 June 2021 | Adrian and Emma Cartlich | Precious Pets Wedding Wheels | N/A | N/A | Decorated wedding car for dogs | Precious Pets Wedding Wheels' pitch failed due to the dragons' concern over the cost of the service and cited low profits. Terms not broadcast. | | Active |
| Episode 10 | 3 June 2021 | Peter Riley and Sara Dickson | Air Vest Ltd | 75,000 | 7.5 | Body worn airbag protection | Air Vest's pitch failed due to the dragons citing concerns over turnover predictions and believing the market to be small for investment. Remains active. | | Active |
| Episode 11 | 10 June 2021 | Elizabeth Morana | Mumba Bra | 60,000 | 15 | 2 hook maternity bras | Mumba Bra's pitch failed due to the dragons scepticism over how useful the latch was, whilst predicting low future profits. Remains active. | | Active |
| Episode 11 | 10 June 2021 | Rasmas and Adele Anderson | Apocalypse Survival Training | N/A | N/A | Adventure themed fitness app | Apocalypse Survival Training's pitch failed due to the dragons' belief that the presentation was flawed and failed to demonstrate any form of fitness demonstration. Terms not broadcast. Remains active. | | Active |
| Episode 12 | 24 June 2021 | Tony McNally | ToneAlly | 50,000 | 10 | Teaching device for playing drums | ToneAlly's pitch failed due to McNally's uncertainty of his profit and the dragons' disbelief in his vision for the business. Remains active. | | Active |
| Episode 12 | 24 June 2021 | Sandra Blanco Gomez | Sophie and Luna London | N/A | N/A | Floral headwear for special occasions | Sophie and Luna London's pitch failed due to the dragons citing low profits and disbelief in the product's longevity. Terms not broadcast. Remains active. | | Active |
| Episode 12 | 24 June 2021 | Pia Varma | Just A Splash | 75,000 | 15 | Range of alcohol pouches for cooking | Just A Splash's pitch failed due to the dragons' concern over Varma's business acumen subsequently leading to Just A Splash losing profit. Company dissolved by December 2021. | | Dissolved (2021) |
| Episode 13 | 1 July 2021 | Hugo and Mark Palmer | Revos (Revolution Works) | N/A | N/A | Device converting regular bikes into E-Ridable | Revos' pitch failed due to the dragons' concern over the RRP and reluctance to reduce the cost by manufacturing it internationally. Terms not broadcast. Remains active. | | Active |
| Episode 13 | 1 July 2021 | Alex Jovy | MyTree | 70,000 | 7 | App tracking carbon-offsets | My Tree's pitch failed due to the dragons' concern over Jovy's struggle to explain the valuation and how he would return the investment. Remains active. | | Active |
| Episode 14 | 8 July 2021 | Kir Carnie | Nuud Gum | 50,000 | 10 | Plant based chewing gum | Nuud Gum's pitch failed due to the dragons citing Carnie's struggle to reduce the cost of production and felt he needed to sell more units before receiving investment. Remains active. | | Active |
| Episode 14 | 8 July 2021 | Delight Mapasure | K' Wors | N/A | N/A | South African recipe sausages | K' Wors pitch failed due to the dragons citing a lack of uniqueness to the product and low net profits. Terms not broadcast. Remains active. | | Active |

=== Series 19 ===
| Episode | First aired | Entrepreneur(s) | Company or product name | Money requested (£) | Equity offered (%) | Description of product | Dragons' reaction | Website | Fate |
|---|---|---|---|---|---|---|---|---|---|
| Episode 1 | 6 January 2022 | Ola Goldsmith | Naked Weave | 70,000 | 15 | Fitting device for hair extensions | Naked Weaves' pitch failed due to the dragons' concern that Goldsmith lacked confidence and believed that she was more in need of a mentor than an investor. Dissolved by 2024. | | Dissolved (2024) |
| Episode 1 | 6 January 2022 | Sarah Gleave | Meg Heath Dog Leads | 30,000 | 5 | Lead designed to aid prevention of dog theft | Meg Heath Dog Leads' pitch failed due to the dragons' belief that the product would not sell to a wide market and Gleeve had overvalued the business. Remains active. | | Active |
| Episode 1 | 6 January 2022 | Grant Bruce | Flux Choice Ltd | 40,000 | 20 | Key-ring accessories | Flux Choices' pitch failed due to the dragons' concern that the products would not sell to a wide market and that Bruce had overvalued the business. Remains active. | | Active |
| Episode 2 | 13 January 2022 | James Inglesby and Diana Ziegler | Nereus | 50,000 | 10 | Sustainable premium beauty care products | Nereus' pitch failed due to the dragons' concerns over the lack of turnover and questioning their business acumen. Company in liquidation as of 2025. | | Liquidation (2025) |
| Episode 3 | 20 January 2022 | Lee Denny and Julia Lowe | Camp Wildfire | 75,000 | 5 | Summer camping adventures for adults | Camp Wildfire's pitch failed due to the dragons citing lack of turnover and questioning their business model. Remains active. | | Active |
| Episode 3 | 20 January 2022 | Thomas Dirse | Upside Down House | 160,000 | 5 | Background drop for social media photos | Upside Down House's pitch failed due to the dragons citing the valuation as over inflated and lacked knowledge of where it would operate. Remains active. | | Active |
| Episode 3 | 20 January 2022 | Zakariya Lloyd and Aaron Branch | Deliver Me | 50,000 | 8 | On-demand delivery mobile app | Deliver Me's pitch failed due to the dragons' belief that the market was already overcrowded and concerns over the proposed rollout cost. Remains active. | | Active |
| Episode 4 | 27 January 2022 | Mark Wong | Impossibrew | 45,000 | 10 | Non-alcoholic beer | Impossibrew's pitch failed due to the dragons citing the cost of the beer as overpriced and concerns over the market being overcrowded. Remains active. | | Active |
| Episode 4 | 27 January 2022 | Louis Claeys | Opal Eco | 85,000 | 20 | Eco-friendly cleaning spray | Opal Eco's pitch failed due to Clays' admission that he had lost his supply chain due to Brexit enforcing the formula to be UK based as opposed to European. Remains active. | | Active |
| Episode 5 | 3 February 2022 | Grigore Davideanu and Alexandru Rus | Monarch's Crisps | N/A | N/A | Pure cheese flavoured crisps | Monarch's Crisps' pitch failed due to the dragons’ dissatisfaction of the company's name and described the product as bland. Terms not broadcast. Remains active. | | Active |
| Episode 5 | 3 February 2022 | Nick Johnson and Nick Graham | Berczy | 120,000 | 10 | Alcoholic sparkling water / seltzer | Berczy's pitch failed due to the dragons citing the company making a loss and felt they lacked the business acumen to take the company forward. Dissolved by 2025. | | Liquidation (2025) |
| Episode 6 | 10 February 2022 | Sheila Hogan | Biscuit Tin | 50,000 | 5 | Digital depository accessible after one's death | Biscuit Tin's pitch failed due to the dragons citing the company making a £1 million loss and similar businesses already on the market. Company in liquidation as of 2023. | | Liquidation (2023) |
| Episode 7 | 17 February 2022 | Mohammad Vahid Nagori and Thibault Denis | Green Bell Packaging | 150,000 | 7.5 | Sustainable plastic free packaging | Green Bell Packaging's pitch failed due to the dragons citing they were unable to patent the product and believed they lacked credentials to promote the business. Remains active. | | Active |
| Episode 8 | 25 February 2022 | Maximilian Reuther | O'Donnell Moonshine and Liquor | 200,000 | 5 | Alcoholic mason Jars based on American Prohibition | O'Donnell Moonshine and Liquor's pitch failed due to the dragons citing Reuther was only a minority shareholder whilst only offering investment in the UK branch and not the German. Remains active. | | Active |
| Episode 8 | 25 February 2022 | Laura Way | Votch | 100,000 | 10 | Vegan watch straps | Votch's pitch failed due to the dragons citing the product lacked uniqueness and felt the business would not return the investment. Remains active. | | Active |
| Episode 8 | 25 February 2022 | Nadia Leguel | WagIt | 50,000 | 5.5 | Online booking service for dog friendly venues | WagIt's pitch failed due to the dragons citing the product was subject to being outdone by search engines and could not be protected. Remains active. | | Active |
| Episode 9 | 3 March 2022 | Anne-Marie Hurst | Floreat sparkling botanic wine | 50,000 | 5 | Sparkling wine low in calories and sulphates and high in biodynamic botanicals | Floreat's pitch failed due to the dragons' belief that the amount of money requested was too low and cited a long repayment term if received more. Remains active. | | Active |
| Episode 9 | 3 March 2022 | Yvonne Aboagye | NETT Exfoliator | 25,000 | 25 | Recyclable exfoliator cloths | NETT Exfoliator's Pitch failed due to the dragons' belief that the company is more lifestyle and philanthropic than a business, the product to be the most expensive, and a continuous decline in sales. Dissolved in 2025. | N/A | Dissolved (2025) |
| Episode 10 | 10 March 2022 | Peter Waine | Okoform | 70,000 | 15 | Heat radiated desks | Okoform's pitch failed due to Waine's admittance of lack of understanding of the competitive market, lack of sales, lack of planning, and a lack of retail and marketing strategy. Remains active. | | Active |
| Episode 11 | 17 March 2022 | Bianca Rangecroft | Whering | 100,000 | 4 | App recommending dress co-ordination | Whering's pitch failed due to the dragons ridiculing the valuation following their belief that her expectations of profit were unrealistic. Remains active. | | Active |
| Episode 11 | 17 March 2022 | Harry Turpin | The Savourists | N/A | N/A | Healthy seed based snack bars | The Savourists’ pitch failed due to the dragons’ distaste of the bars and belief that the product lacked branding. Terms not broadcast. Remains active. | | Active |
| Episode 11 | 17 March 2022 | Lyndsay Watterson | Neo walk | 80,000 | 15 | Neo light and stylish walking aids | Neo walk's pitch failed due to the dragons citing a lack of availability in copyright protection and felt the investment would take too long a time to be repaid. Remains active. | | Active |
| Episode 12 | 24 March 2022 | Sarah Bell-Jones and Caroline Kennedy-Alexander | Love Rose Lingerie | 70,000 | 15 | Luxury laundry brand for breast cancer sufferers | Love Rose Lingerie's pitch failed due to the dragons' belief that the market was niche. Remains active. | | Active |
| Episode 12 | 24 March 2022 | Zara Saleem | Delhicious Body | 50,000 | 15 | Vegan skin-care brand | Delhicious Body's pitch failed due to the dragons citing low sales particularly during the COVID-19 lockdowns and lacking a unique selling point. Remains active. | | Active |
| Episode 13 | 31 March 2022 | Tommy Lads, Richard and Samantha Davies | Gasm Drinks | 50,000 | 15 | Champagne gin cocktails | Gasm Drinks' pitch failed due to the dragons’ dissatisfaction with the branding and concerns over the overall funding strategy. Remains active. | | Active |
| Episode 13 | 31 March 2022 | Katarzyna Kania | Bambino Crayons | 70,000 | 15 | Clay crayons alternative to wax | Bambino Crayons' pitch failed due to the dragons citing low sales and ridiculing the valuation. Company entered liquidation three months before the episode's broadcast and was dissolved by 2024. | | Dissolved (2024) |
| Episode 13 | 31 March 2022 | Louis Castro, Andrew and Rene Perkins | City MaaS | 100,000 | 5 | Global accessibility website assisting the disabled | City MaaS's pitch failed due to the dragons' belief that the business was better suited to free-downloads and profiting from royalties and subsequently felt the business was over-valued. Remains active. | | Active |
| Episode 14 | 7 April 2022 | Victoria Barry and Michael Robinson | The Tiny Workbench | 60,000 | 30 | Self crafted tabletop workbenches | The Tiny Workbench's pitch failed due to the dragons citing a high production cost and RRP with low margins. Company in liquidation as of 2023. | | Liquidation (2023) |
| Episode 14 | 7 April 2022 | Jonathan Pikeit and Daniel Baker | View-You Cam | 150,000 | 15 | Web camera aiding eye contact on conference calls | View-You Cam's pitch failed due to the dragons citing a lack of patenting and concerns over the ease of replication. Dissolved by 2024. | | Dissolved (2024) |

=== Series 20 ===
| Episode | First aired | Entrepreneur(s) | Company or product name | Money requested (£) | Equity offered (%) | Description of product | Dragons' reaction | Website | Fate |
|---|---|---|---|---|---|---|---|---|---|
| Episode 1 | 5 January 2023 | Jordan and Nicholas McInerny | Drag Diva | 50,000 | N/A | Exercise classes with a drag queen | Drag Divas's pitch failed due to the dragons citing low net profits and concerns over the marketing strategy. Terms of equity not broadcast. | | N/A |
| Episode 1 | 5 January 2023 | Poala Farino | Carried by Farino | 75,000 | 15 | Portable luggage bags and carrier | Carried by Farino's pitch failed due to the dragons citing Carrier had re-mortgaged her house to finance the company and a high RRP. Remains active. | | Active |
| Episode 2 | 12 January 2023 | Chris and Martin Andrew | Bed Stretch | 80,000 | 20 | Headboards extending lengths of beds | Bed Stretch's pitch failed due to the dragons' concerns with the company's sales strategies and that the investment pitched for was futile. Remains active. | | Active |
| Episode 3 | 19 January 2023 | Vandana and Kunal Nanavati | Nana's Chutneys | 40,000 | 20 | Range of gluten-free and vegan friendly chutneys | Nana's Chutneys' pitch failed due to the dragons' concerns that the product was not researched well enough to be commercialised and currently being made in the Nanavati's home kitchen. Remains active. | | Active |
| Episode 3 | 19 January 2023 | Rupert Cattell | Road Rower | 50,000 | 10 | Outdoor exercise machine combining rowing and cycling | Road Rower's pitch failed due to the dragons' concerns over the size of the target market and cited a high RRP. Remains active. | | Active |
| Episode 4 | 26 January 2023 | Ashlee Ackland | Sparkle Butt | 50,000 | 20 | Gender neutral sparkled party wear | Sparkle Butt's pitch failed due to the dragons' belief that the market was niche and the business was at too early a stage for investment. Company in administration as of 2024. | | In administration (2024) |
| Episode 5 | 2 February 2023 | Michael Horsfall | Van Guardian | 45,000 | 10 | Car alarm for vans | Van Guardian's pitch failed due to Horsfall's struggle to describe his patent and business model. Remains active. | | Active |
| Episode 5 | 2 February 2023 | Moray Luke | Moray Luke Products | 30,000 | 20 | Handbags made from fish leather | Moray Luke's pitch failed due to the dragons citing low sales and belief that the business was not ready for investment. Touker Suleyman nonetheless offered his contact details for further advice. Remains Active. | | Active |
| Episode 5 | 2 February 2023 | Robbie MacIsaac | Flux Blowpipe | N/A | N/A | Bagpipe accessory that absorbs moisture. | Flux blowpipes pitch failed due to the dragons citing the marketplace to be small and fearing a long-repayment structure. Terms not broadcast. Remains active. | | Active |
| Episode 6 | 9 February 2023 | Lucy Norris | Second Hand Styling | 70,000 | 12 | Clothes-swapping service funded by subscriptions | Second Hand Styling's pitch failed due to the dragons citing similar services already on the market and concerns over cleaning costs. Remains active. | | Active |
| Episode 6 | 9 February 2023 | Richard Johnson | Street Food Ventures | 60,000 | 9 | Street food events | Street food events pitch failed due to the dragons citing declining net profits and Johnson's struggle to explain his business models. Remains active. | | Active |
| Episode 7 | 16 February 2023 | Fan Yang | Other Foods | 60,000 | 10 | Mushroom snacks | Other Foods' pitch failed due to Yang's struggle to calculate her profits and admitting a high percentage paid to distributors. Remains active. | | Active |
| Episode 8 | 23 February 2023 | Victoria Jenkins | Unhidden | 40,000 | 5 | Fashion brand for the disabled | Unhidden's pitch failed due to the dragons ridiculing the valuation having been based on pre-launch sales and concerns over the business model. Company in liquidation as of 2024. | | Liquidation (2024) |
| Episode 8 | 23 February 2023 | Bradley Watson and James Khan | Smart Snout | 50,000 | 10 | Biometric technology and AI to protect pets against loss and theft | Smart snouts’ pitch failed due to the dragons citing loss reports could only be shared on the app and ease of replication. Remains active. | | Active |
| Episode 9 | 2 March 2023 | Steve Capon and Mark Sheahan | Matey Measure | 80,000 | 10 | Aid for tape measure accuracy | Matey Measure's pitch failed due to the dragons citing a low turnover and concerns that the product did not solve any problems. Remains active. | | Active |
| Episode 9 | 2 March 2023 | Peta Seymour | The Fobbit | N/A | N/A | Multi-purpose key-ring | The Fobbit's pitch failed due to the dragons’ concerns that the product did not solve any issues and suspected similar products on the market. Terms not broadcast. | | N/A |
| Episode 9 | 2 March 2023 | Natel Allen | Télle Moi | 40,000 | 20 | Vegan hand crafted nail polish | Télle Moi's pitch failed due to the dragons’ concerns over scalability and cited ingredients that may contradict the branding as vegan. Remains active. | | Active |
| Episode 10 | 9 March 2023 | Kassi Emadi | Nuddy | 70,000 | 7 | Eco-friendly skincare products | Nuddy's pitch failed due to Emadi's struggle to calculate her finances and the dragons’ concerns over how the investment would be spent. Dissolved by 2024. | | Dissolved (2024) |
| Episode 11 | 16 March 2023 | Jenna McCorkell | Chique Sport | 100,000 | 7.5 | Sportswear for ice-skating | Chique Sport's pitch failed due to the dragons’ concerns over the quality of the fabrics whilst advising she was overall not ready for an investor. Remains active. | | Active |
| Episode 12 | 23 March 2023 | Lisa Hickey | Grip + Glow | 30,000 | 10 | Skincare range designed for the pole fitness | Grip and Glow's pitch failed due to the dragons citing the market as limited and Hickey's struggle to calculate her profit forecasts. Remains active. | | Active |
| Episode 13 | 30 March 2023 | Thersea Pope | Dandi London | 150,000 | 30 | Armpit sweat patches | Dandi London's pitch failed due to the dragons citing high net losses and Pope's lack of knowledge on her desire to spend the investment on social media advertising. Remains active. | | Active |
| Episode 13 | 30 March 2023 | Dr Nilantha Pulathis Siriwardana and Siddhi Siriwardana | Handisure | 60,000 | 8 | Door finger guard | Handisure's pitch failed due to the dragons citing design flaws causing the device not to operate as pitched and a high cost of manufacturing. Remains active. | | Active |
| Episode 14 | 6 April 2023 | Steven and Jacqueline Pyne | Scotch Galore Whiskies | 65,000 | 10 | Whisky auction website | Scotch Galore Whiskies’ pitch failed due to the dragons citing the Pyne's mis-calculating their profits and high expenditure. Remains active. | | Active |
