= Cycle rickshaw =

Pedal-powered version of the rickshaw

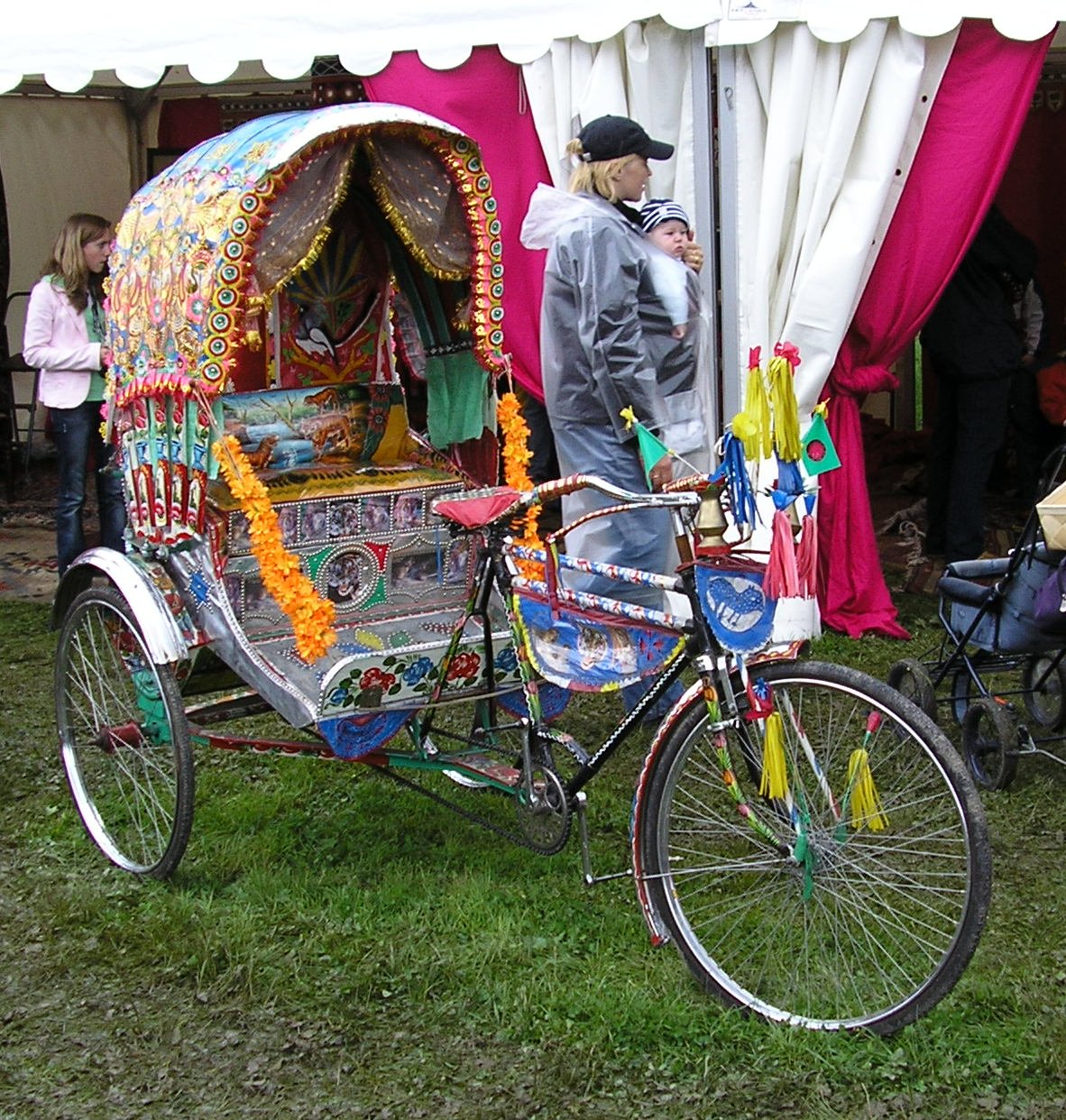
A Bangladeshi cycle rickshaw for display in Sweden

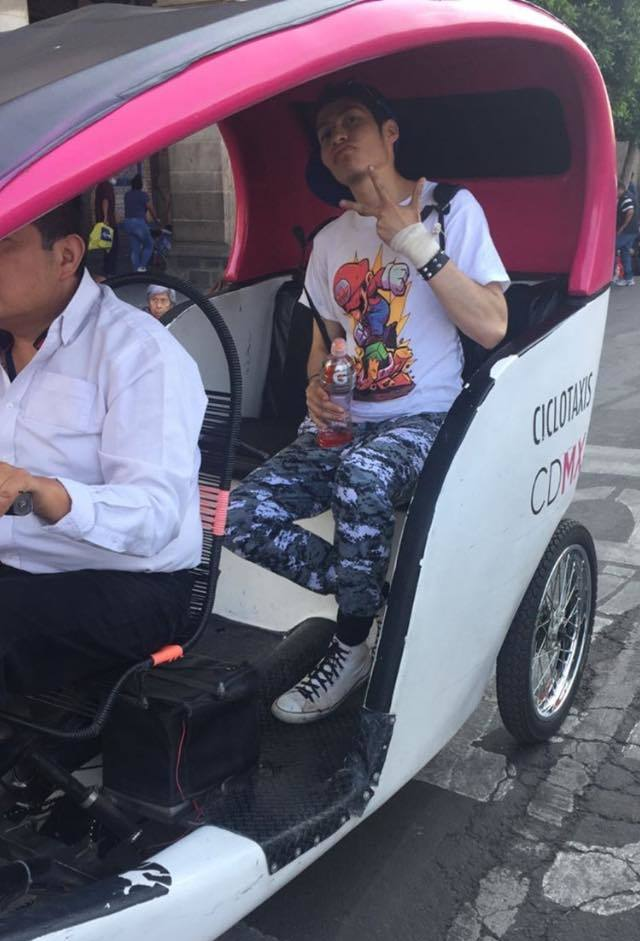
Cycle rickshaw in Mexico City, with the design established since 2016

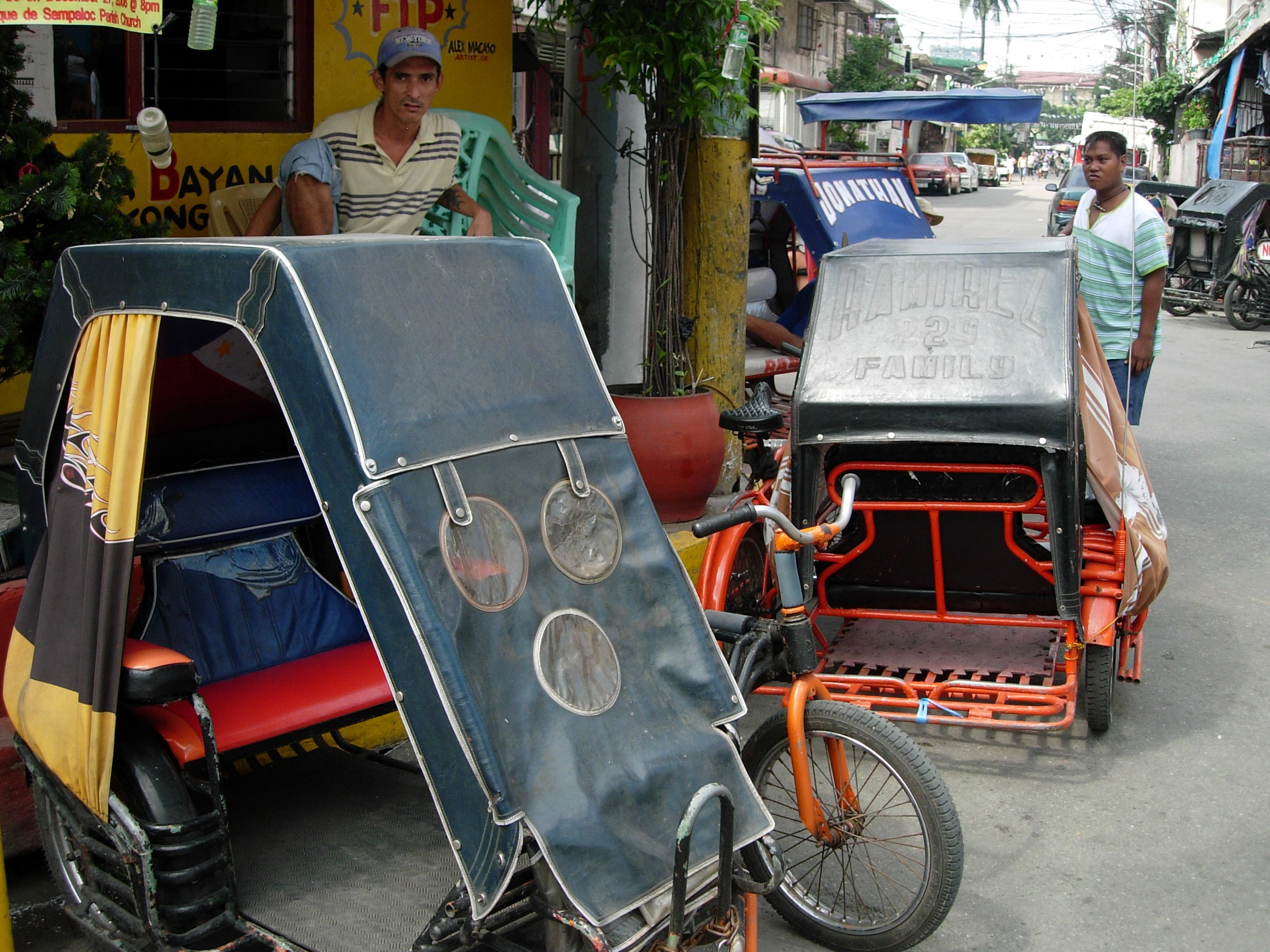
Typical Manila pedicabs, or "trisikad"

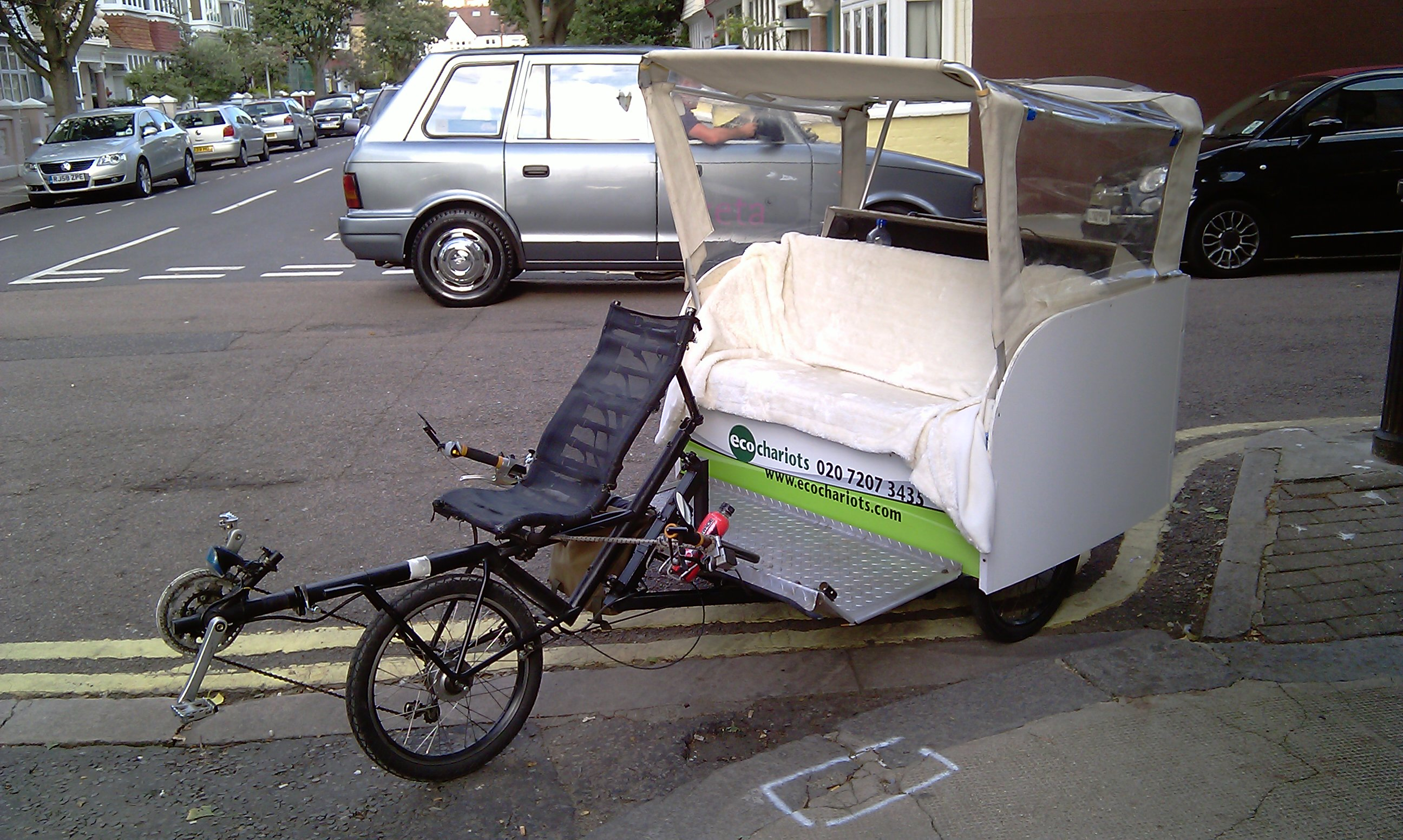
Recumbent style cycle taxi/pedicab in London

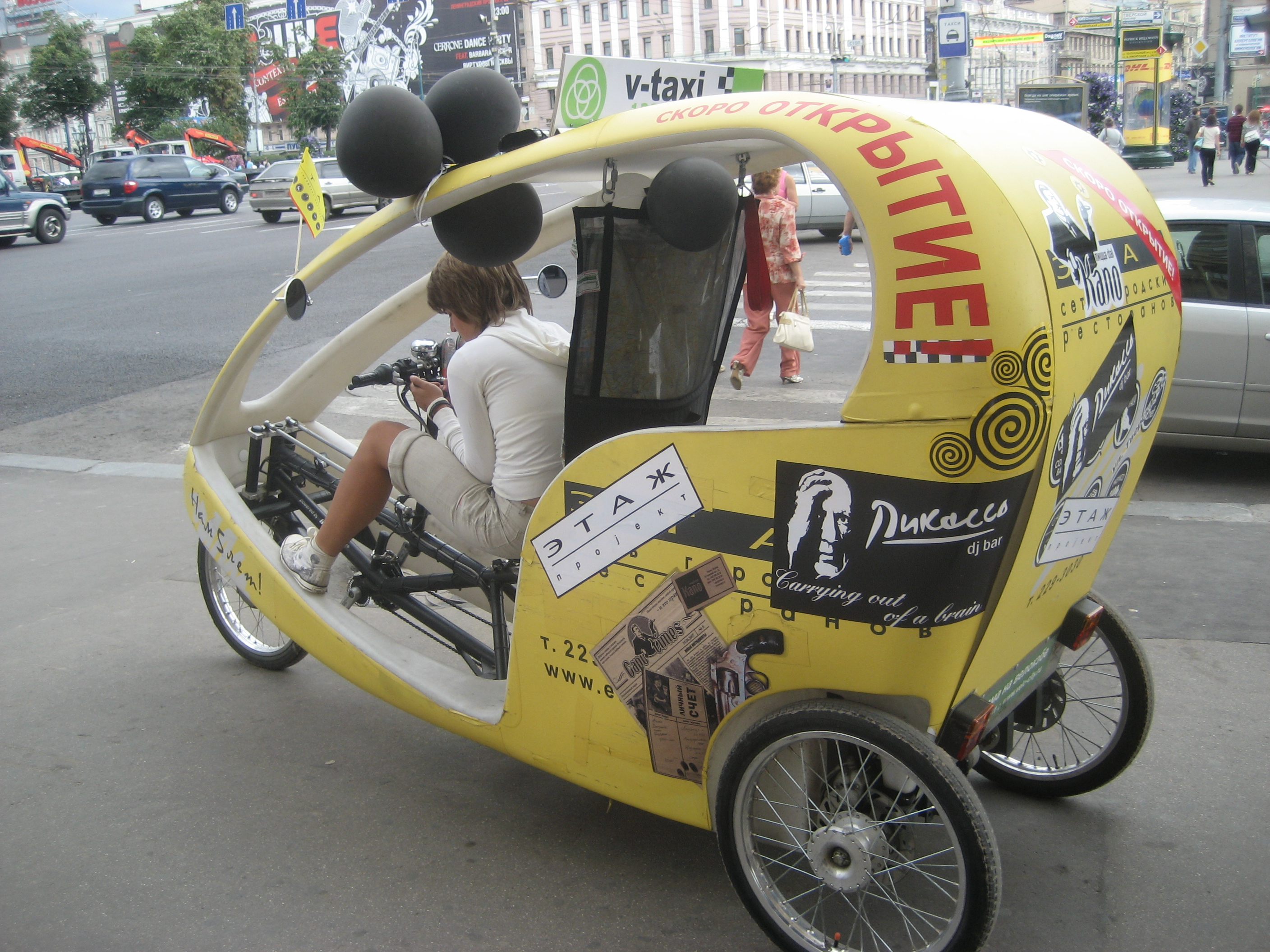
Cycle rickshaw in Moscow, Russia

The cycle rickshaw is a small-scale means of local transport. A type of tricycle designed to carry passengers on a for-hire basis, it may also be known as bike taxi, velotaxi, pedicab, bikecab, cyclo, beca, becak, trisikad, sikad, tricycle taxi, trishaw, or hatchback bike.

The cycle rickshaw is human-powered by pedaling, in contrast to the classic rickshaw, pulled by a person on foot, and distinct from the motorized auto rickshaw.

== Overview ==
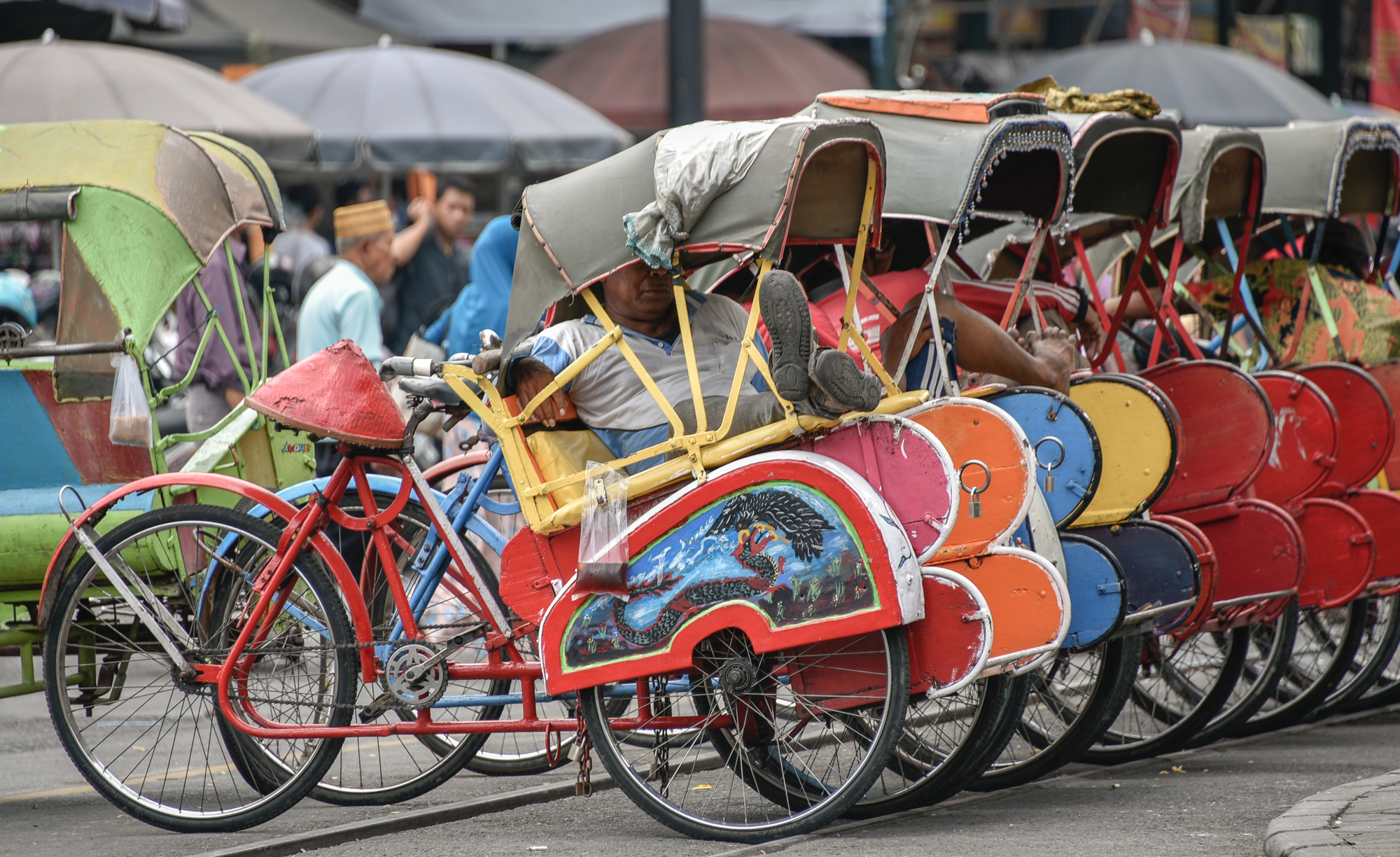
Pedicab or "Becak" (in Indonesian language) in Solo, Central Java, Indonesia

The first cycle rickshaws were built in the 1880s and were first used widely in 1929 in Singapore. Six years later, they outnumbered pulled rickshaws there. By 1950, cycle rickshaws were found in every south and east Asian country. By the late 1980s, there were an estimated 4 million cycle rickshaws worldwide.

The vehicle is generally pedal-driven by a driver, though some are equipped with an electric motor to assist the driver.

The vehicle is usually a tricycle, though some quadracycle models exist, and some bicycles with trailers are configured as cycle rickshaws. Some cycle rickshaws have gas or electric motors.

=== Passenger configuration ===
The configuration of driver and passenger seats varies. Generally the driver sits in front of the passengers to pedal the rickshaw. There are some designs, though, where the cyclist driver sits behind the passengers. In many Asian countries, like Bangladesh, India, and China, the passenger seat is located behind the driver, while in Indonesia, Malaysia, Cambodia, and Vietnam the cyclist driver sits behind the passenger. In the Philippines, the passenger seats are usually located beside the driver in a side car. Similar to this, passengers sit alongside the driver in both trishaw, in Singapore, and the sai kaa, in Burma.

== Nomenclature ==
The cycle rickshaw is known by a variety of other names, including:

- velotaxi (used in Germany)
- pussuss (used in parts of France)
- velotram (used in parts of France)
- bikecab
- cyclo (used in Vietnam and Cambodia)
- pedicab (used in the United Kingdom, United States, and Canada)
- bike taxi (used in Buffalo, New York)
- bicitaxi (used in Mexico)
- samlor (used in Thailand)
- taxi ecológico (used in Mexico)
- trishaw
- beca [ˈbetʃa] (used in Malaysia)
- becak [ˈbetʃaʔ] (used in Indonesia), helicak [heliˈtʃaʔ] (engine-powered instead of manually pedalled)
- traysikad, trisikad, sikad, or padyak [ˈpad͡ʒaʔ] (used in the Philippines)

== Country overview ==
Not only are cycle rickshaws used in Asian countries, but they are also used in some cities in Europe and North America. They are used primarily for their novelty value, as an entertaining form of transportation for tourists and locals, but they also have environmental benefits and may be quicker than other forms of transport if traffic congestion is high. Cycle rickshaws used outside Asia often are mechanically more complex, having multiple gears, more powerful brakes, and in some cases electrical motors to provide additional power.

=== Africa ===
==== Madagascar ====
In Madagascar rickshaws, including cycle rickshaws or cyclo-pousse, are a common form of transportation in a number of cities. Rickshaws are known as pousse-pousse, meaning push-push, reportedly for the pulled rickshaws that required a second person to push the vehicles up hills. Cycles are more common in the hillier areas, like Toamasina.

=== Americas ===
==== Canada ====
In Canada there are pedicabs in operation in Victoria, British Columbia, and Vancouver, British Columbia. They are regulated in Toronto, Ontario, and Vancouver, British Columbia.

==== Mexico ====
In Mexico, they are called bicitaxi or taxi ecológico (literally "ecological taxi").

==== United States ====
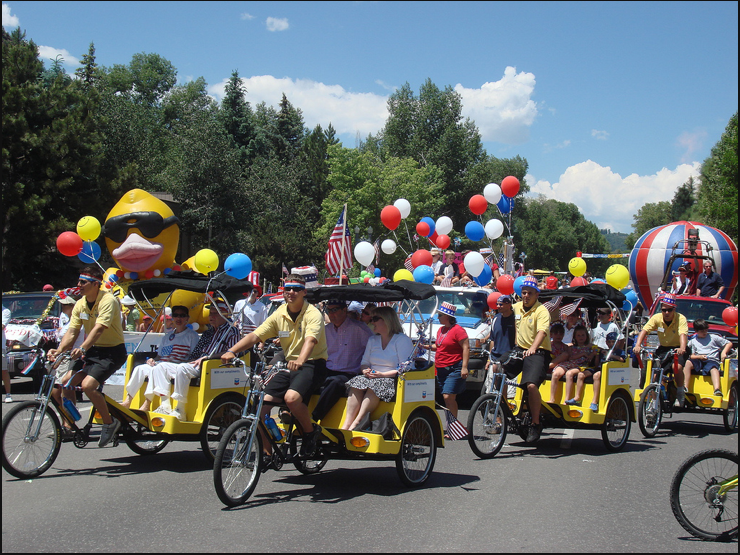
Jays Valet, Luxury Transportation & Pedicab Service in the 4th of July (Independence Day) Parade in Aspen, Colorado

In many major cities, pedicabs can be found rolling about city centers, nightlife districts, park lands, sports stadiums, and tourist-heavy areas. Myriad uses have been discovered in the states, including car-park-to-event transport at large events nationwide. Thousands of pedicabs today operate on streets in locales including Green Bay and Milwaukee, Wisconsin; Austin, Texas; Manhattan, New York; Chicago, Illinois; San Diego and San Francisco, California; Boston, Massachusetts; Miami, Florida; Washington, D.C.; Denver, Colorado; Portland, Oregon; Seattle, Washington; Charleston, South Carolina; New Orleans, Louisiana; Nashville, Tennessee; Phoenix, Arizona; Salt Lake City, Utah; Philadelphia, Pennsylvania; and dozens of other hot spots. Manhattan sports the largest collection of pedicabs operating within city limits, and the City of New York itself has mandated that approximately 850 pedicabs always sport operating permits issued by the city.

Pedicabs in the United States seem to have gotten their start at the 1962 World's Fair in Seattle.

=== Asia ===
==== Bangladesh ====
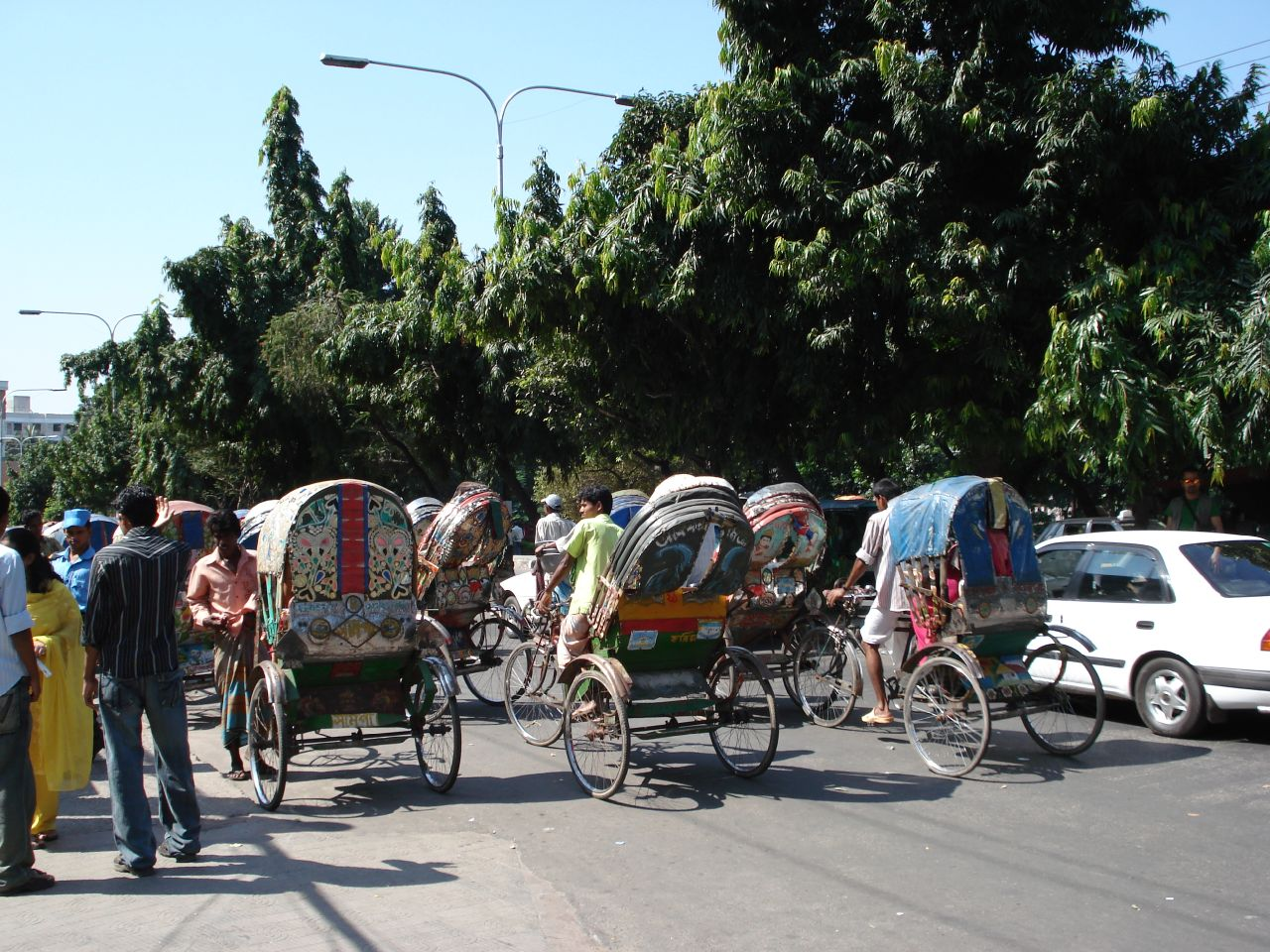
Cycle rickshaws in Dhaka, Bangladesh. The city is known as the Rickshaw Capital of the World.

Cycle rickshaws (রিকশা riksha) are the most popular modes of transport in Bangladesh and are available for hire throughout the country including the capital city Dhaka, known as the "Rickshaw Capital of the World". They are either pedal or motor-powered. They were introduced here about 1938 and by the end of the 20th century there were 300,000+ cycle rickshaws in Dhaka.

Approximately 400,000 cycle rickshaws run each day. Cycle rickshaws in Bangladesh are also more convenient than the other public modes of transports in the country namely auto rickshaws, cabs and buses. They are mostly convertible, decorated, rickshaws with folding hoods and are the only kind of vehicles that can be driven in many neighbourhoods of the city with narrow streets and lanes. However, increasing traffic congestion and the resulting collisions have led to the banning of rickshaws on many major streets in the city. Urban employment in Bangladesh also largely depend on cycle rickshaws. Because of inflation and unemployment in the rural areas, people from villages crowd in the cities to become rickshaw drivers locally called the riksha-wala (রিকশাওয়ালা).

==== Cambodia ====
Cycle rickshaws are known as cyclo (pronounced see-clo) in Cambodia, derived from the French cyclo.

==== China ====
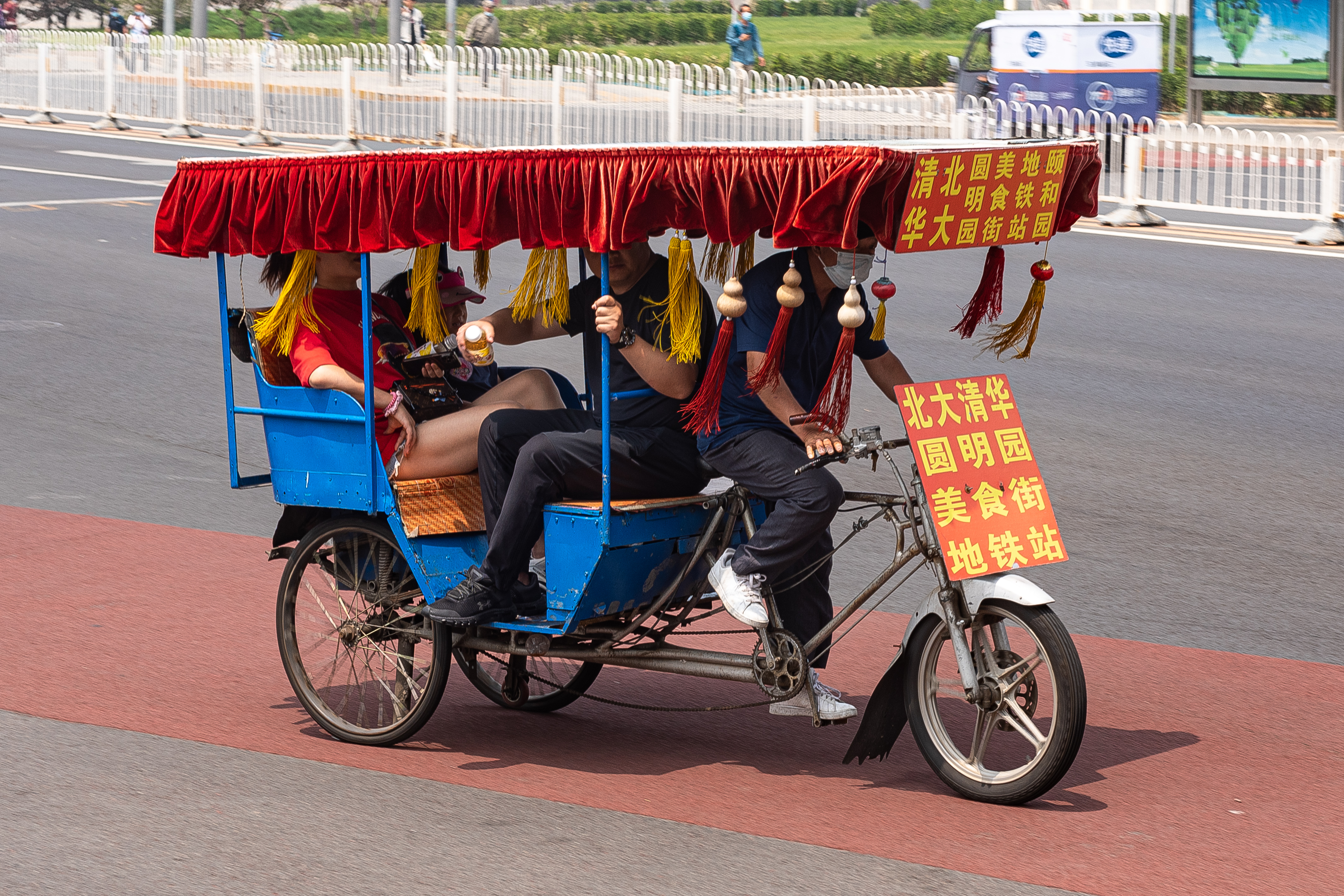
A cycle rickshaw at Xiyuan, Beijing, targeting at tourists from Summer Palace

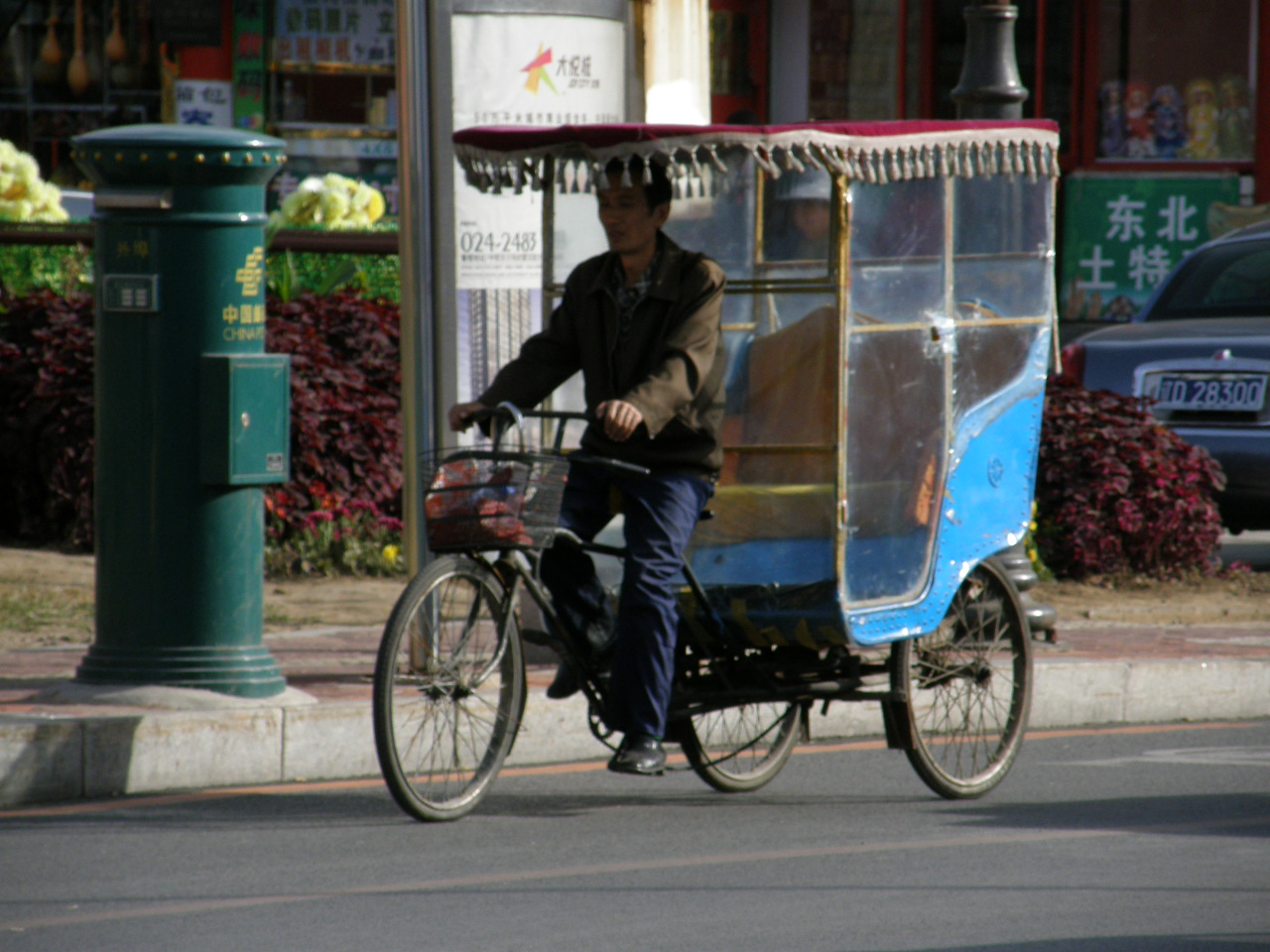
Cycle rickshaw in Shenyang

Since the 1950s, when the pulled rickshaw was phased out, mid-city and large city passengers may travel using three-wheeled pedicabs, or cycle rickshaws. The Chinese term for the conveyance is sanlunche (三轮车). The vehicles may be pedal- or motor-powered. In Shanghai, most of the vehicles are powered by electricity.

Tourists are warned to beware of over-charging vendors, especially who wear an "old fashioned costume" or are located near tourist locations.

Whilst many local tourism authorities still issue licences for rickshaw drivers to carry passengers, authorities in China are tightening rules in order to alleviate cheating of tourists and to reduce traffic congestion (e.g. a typical Chinese cycle-rickshaw will travel at less than 10 km/h and is wide enough to fill an entire motor or bicycle lane and therefore are blamed as a major cause of traffic congestion), and have been banned in many cities already.

==== India ====
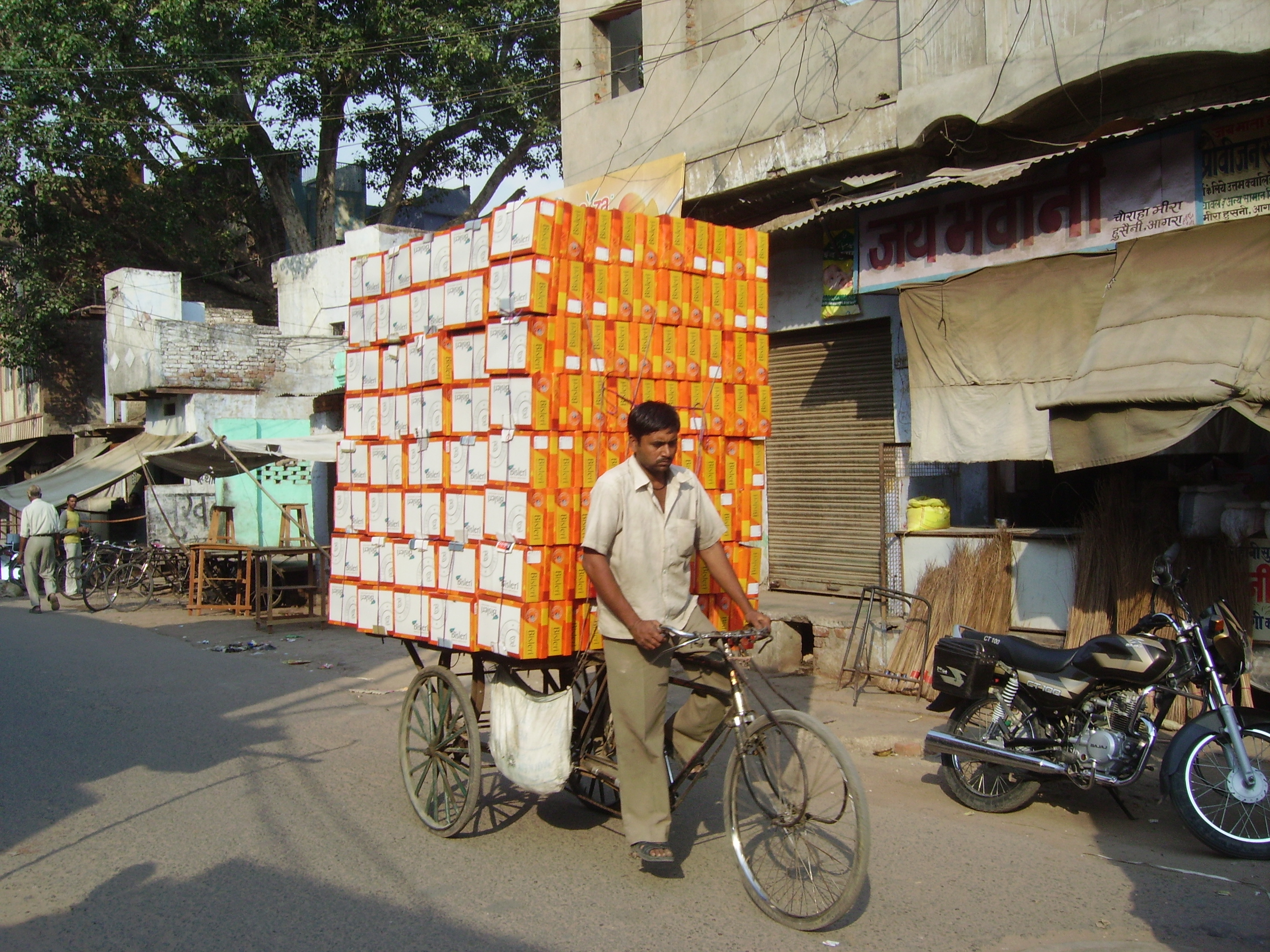
A cycle rickshaw carrying shoe boxes in Agra

The first attempt of improving the existing cycle rickshaws and then converting them to electric ones was done by the Nimbkar Agricultural Research Institute in the late 1990s.

===== Service availability =====
Cycle rickshaws were used in Kolkata starting about 1930 and are now common in rural and urban areas of India.

===== Ecocabs and similar service =====
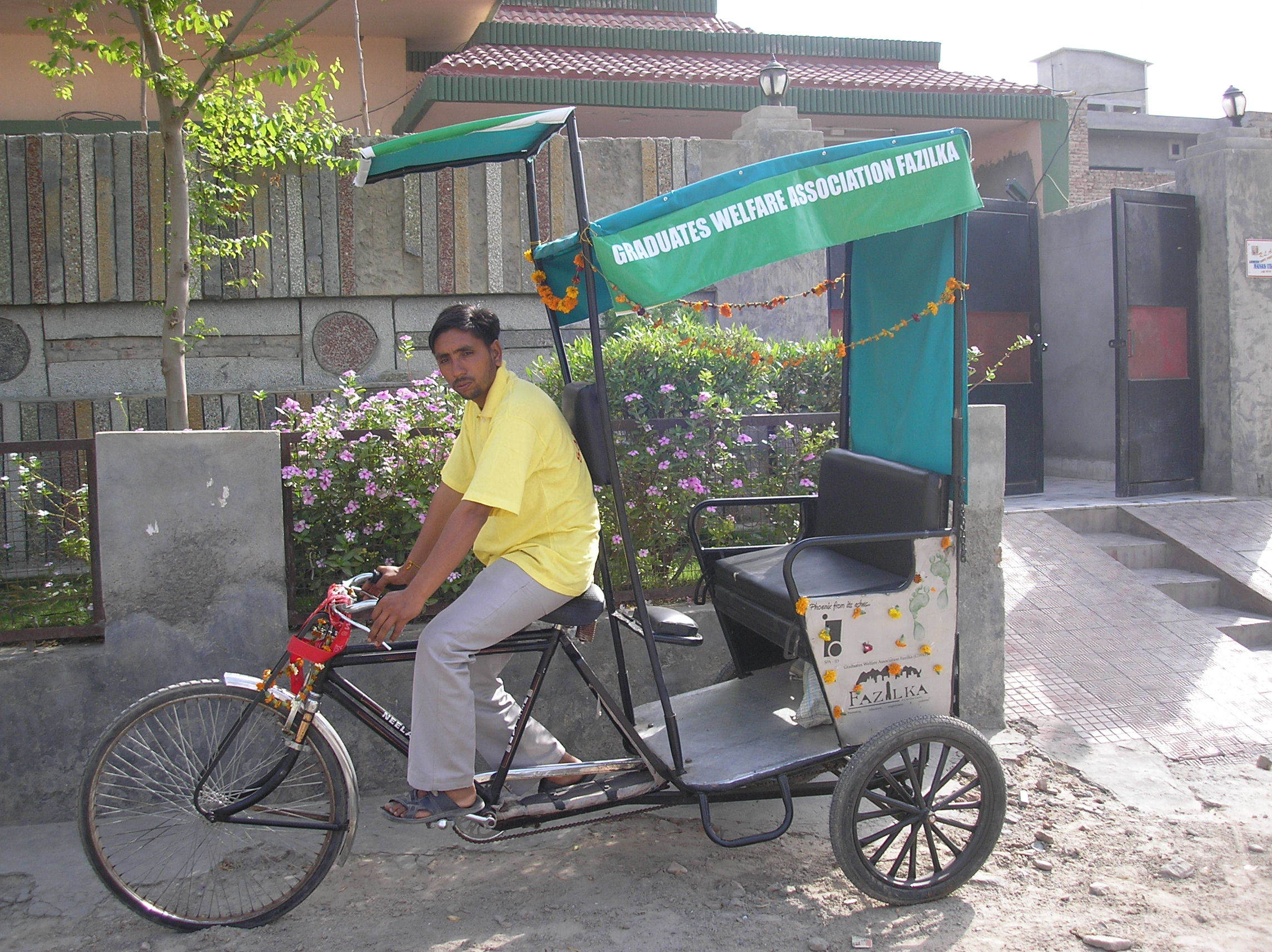
Traction Man on Fazilka Ecocab "Nano Model"

Navdeep Asija started a dial-a-cycle rickshaw concept known as Ecocabs, Environmental friendly Ecocabs (Note: In 2010, Ecocab service was introduced by the state governments of Punjab and Haryana upon the orders of the Honorable Punjab and Haryana High Court.) operate in the Punjab towns of Fazilka, Amritsar. (Note: Ecocabs were introduced in Amritsar by the Punjab Heritage and Tourism Promotion Board in association with Graduates Welfare Association Fazilka (GWAF) and District Administration in Amritsar. Here in the Ecocabs) Central Delhi and Kolkata. Passengers may call to request transport service, similar to dial-up taxi cab operations. (Note: Named "Ecocabs", it is known locally as "Pushpak Sewa". the first modified light-weight low-floor rickshaw was introduced under the name Nano.)

In November 2010, Patiala GreenCABS, similar to Ecocabs, were introduced in the city by the local non governmental organisation (NGO) the Patiala Foundation.

===== Financing =====
In West Bengal the Rotaract Club of Serampore finances cycle rickshaw purchases so that unemployed people can begin their own rickshaw business. The loans are repaid from the workers' earnings. When paid in full, the rickshaw workers own their rickshaw and other unemployed individuals are entered into the program.

===== Soleckshaw =====
The Soleckshaw is a battery-electric assisted cycle rickshaw. The battery is designed to be charged or exchanged at centralised solar-powered charging stations. Developed by the Council of Scientific & Industrial Research, it was launched in Delhi in October 2008. However, in September 2010 it was reported that no Soleckshaws had been sold on a commercial basis, and the approximately 30 demonstration units, initially deployed in Ahmedabad, Chandigarh, Delhi, Dhanbad, Durgapur, Jaipur, and Kolkata, were "not in operation due to various local administrative and management problems", and the charging stations "are not being used at this point of time as the vehicles are not in operation at those locations".

The 2010 Union budget of India had a concessional excise duty of 4% on solar cycle rickshaws.

==== Indonesia ====
Cycle rickshaws in Indonesia are called becak (pronounced [ˈbetʃaʔ]). They began to be used in Jakarta around 1936. Becak were considered an icon of the capital city of Jakarta prior to its ban in the 1970s. Citing concerns of public order, the city government forbade them on the city's main streets. Scenes of the anti-becak campaign appear in the 1971 Canadian film Wet Earth and Warm People, a documentary by Michael Rubbo. Despite attempts at eradication, however, many becak still operate near slums throughout the city. Attempts at reinforcing the ban resulted in large-scale seizures of the vehicle in the late 1990s and in 2007. In 2018, Governor Anies Baswedan attempted to allow becak again because of a political contract with becak drivers during his campaign.

There are two types of becak in Indonesia, with the first type having the driver sitting behind the passenger (similar to Dutch-style cargo bikes), while the other one, mainly found in Sumatra, has the driver sitting beside the passenger. Becak is still used in various parts of Indonesia, especially in smaller cities and towns.

==== Malaysia ====
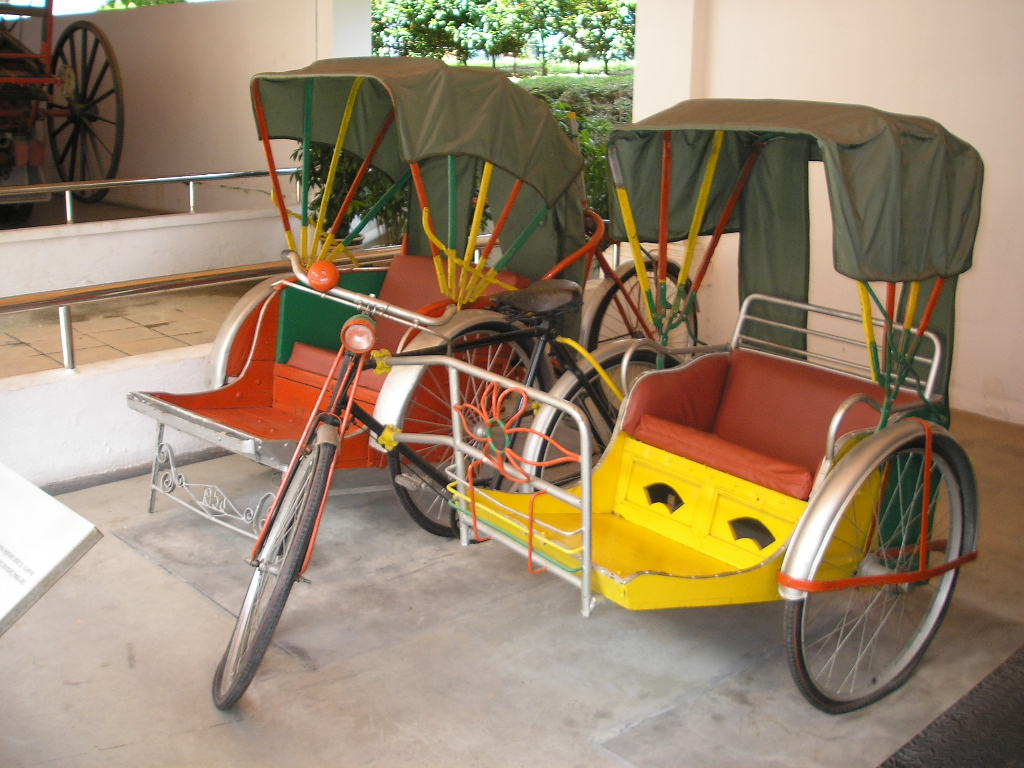
Beca donated from Parit Jawa, Muar, Johore, at the Muzium Negara

In Malaysia, pedestrian-pulled rickshaws were gradually replaced by cycle rickshaws or "trishaws" (in Malay: beca pronounced [ˈbetʃa] from Hokkien 馬車 bé-chhia "horse cart"). Trishaws were ubiquitous up to the 1970s in cities. Since then, rapid urbanisation has increased demand for more efficient public transport, resulting in dwindling trishaw numbers. Today, trishaws are operated mostly as tourist attractions, with small numbers operating in Malacca, Penang, Kelantan, and Terengganu.

Malaccan trishaws tend to be more decorated with lights and plush toys than Penangite trishaws.

==== Myanmar ====
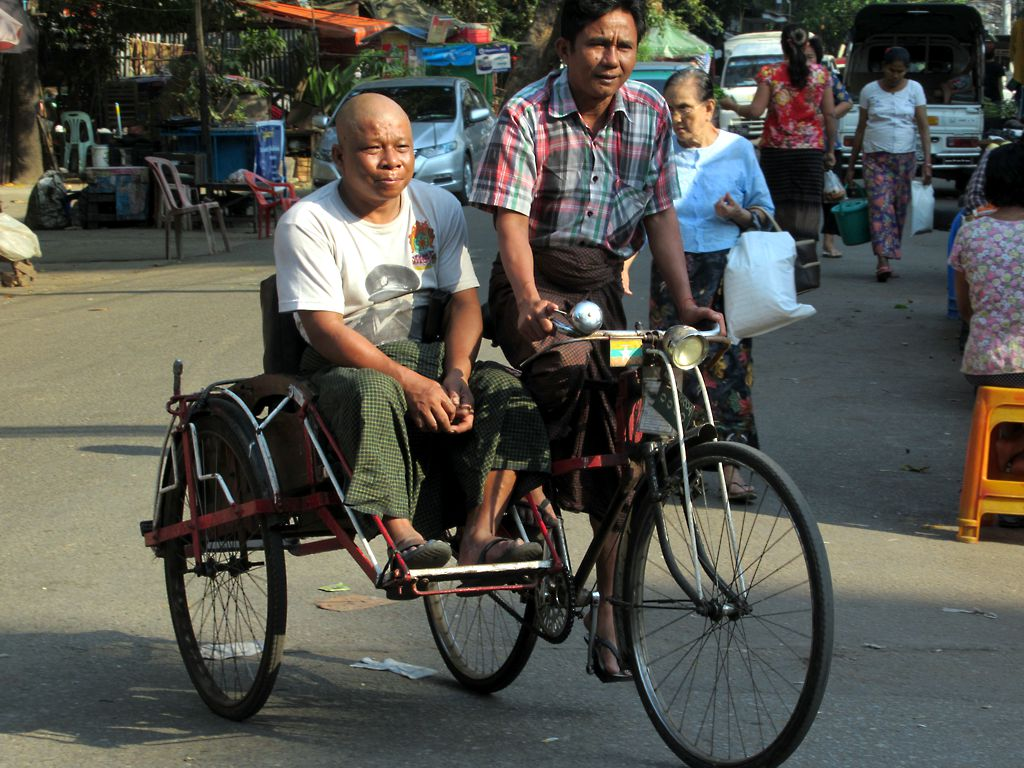
A cycle rickshaw in Yangon

In Myanmar, cycle rickshaws or trishaws (Burmese: ဆိုက်ကား, romanized: saik kar, directly pronounced as in the English word 'side car') came first into wide use in 1938, when the 1300 Revolution, which originated from the Chauk oil-field strike, inspired the people in Mandalay to have a consciousness of nationalism and to boycott British goods and services. The auto body technician Saya Nyo built the first trishaw in Mandalay by attaching a side-car to the side of an old bicycle. So two passengers are on the right of the driver.

Only two forms of transportation were then available in the city; the cab and the electric train. The latter could run only on ten-kilometre (six-mile) tracks. Trishaws could reach every nook and cranny, so the spirit of nationalism plus the advantage of trishaws reaching everywhere made them so popular among Mandalayans that even the train company had to stop its business.

==== Nepal ====
In the Terai region of Nepal, cycle rickshaws are still the most popular means of public transport for short-distance commuting. Most big cities in the Terai have hundreds of cycle rickshaws that carry local commuters and travellers, and are also used for carrying goods. Since the Terai region is bordered with India, cycle rickshaws are also popular means for shoppers, businessmen and travellers to travel in and out of the country freely. The free border between India and Nepal enable the rickshaw owners from both countries to operate across the border without any restriction.

However, in Hilly regions of Nepal, cycle rickshaws are primarily used to attract tourists who can relax and travel around the popular streets and markets at reasonable fares. Cycle rickshaws are particularly popular among tourists to roam around the popular streets and markets of Thamel, Kathmandu.

==== Pakistan ====
The cycle and pulled rickshaw were banned in Pakistan in November 1991.

==== Philippines ====
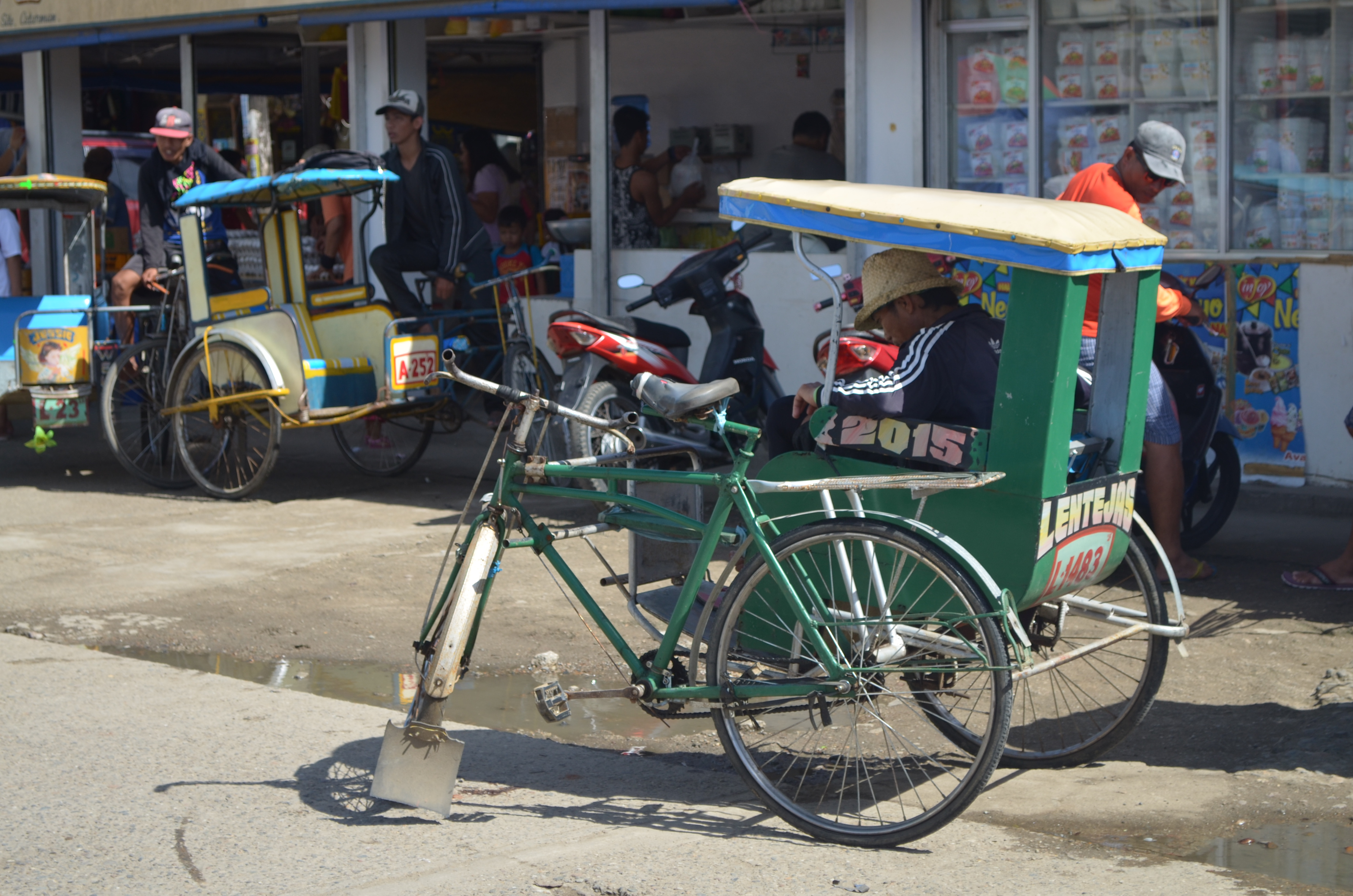
Passenger pedicab in Catarman, Northern Samar

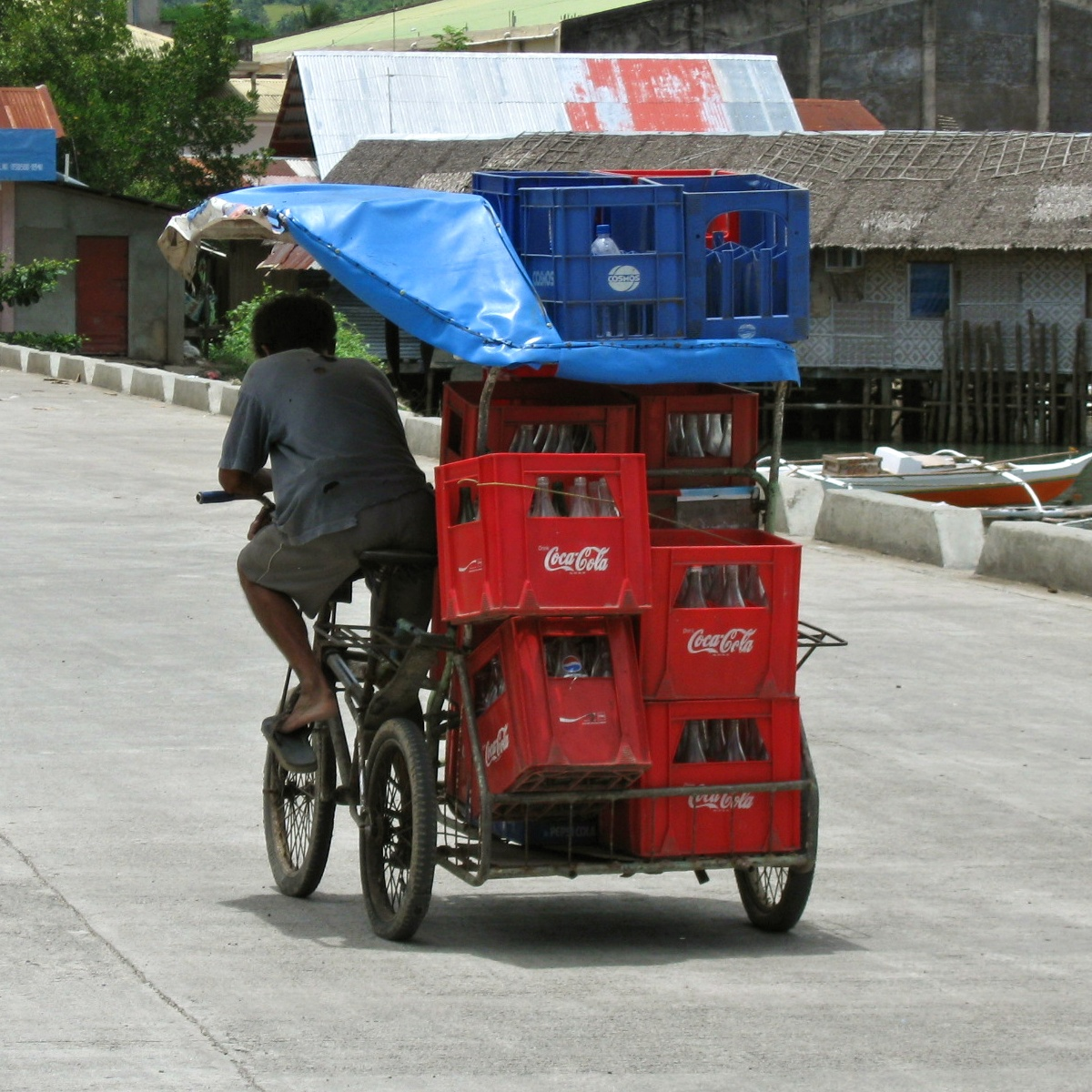
Traysikad used for cargo transport

In the Philippines, it is called a pedicab, traysikad, trisikad—or simply sikad or padyák, from the Philippine word meaning to tramp or stamp one's feet. Made by mounting a sidecar to a regular bicycle, these are used mainly to ferry passengers short distances along smaller, more residential streets, often to or from jeepneys and other public utility vehicles. These are also used for transporting heavy cargo such as livestock over a relatively short distance, or roads too congested for conventional motor transport. During the rainy season, these are useful to avoid walking in shallow floodwaters and mud. Along with the jeepney, the motorcycle-powered tricycle, and the engine-powered kuliglíg, the open-air pedicab provides shaded transport.

==== South Korea ====
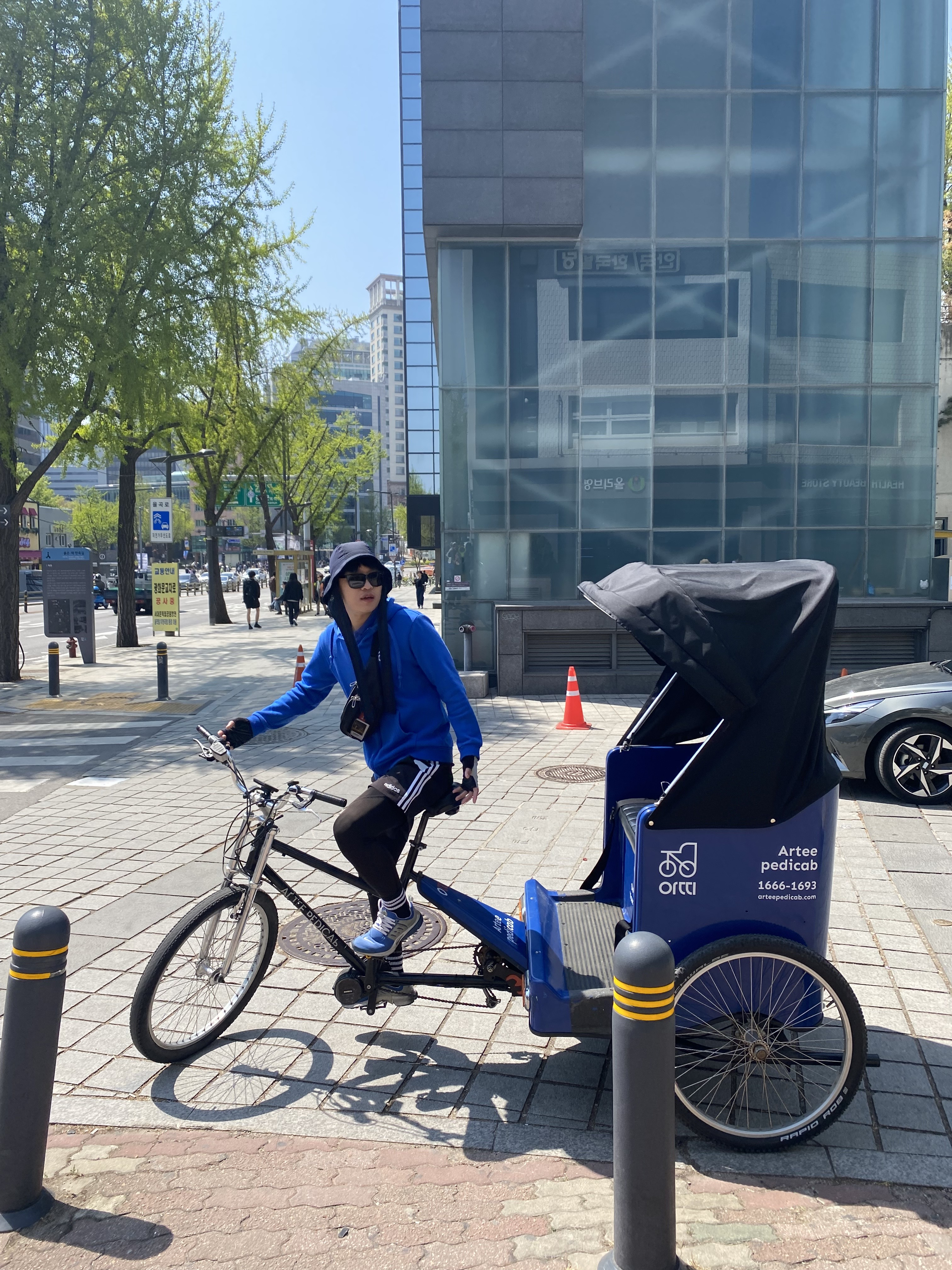
Cycle rickhaw in Seoul, South Korea

The Korean term for cycle rickshaw is illyeokgeo (인력거), which can be pedal- or motor-powered, though most in South Korea are electric. While not commonly used as a primary mode of transportation, cycle rickshaws can still be found in certain areas like Bukchon Hanok Village in Seoul, where they operate mainly for tourism purposes.

==== Thailand ====
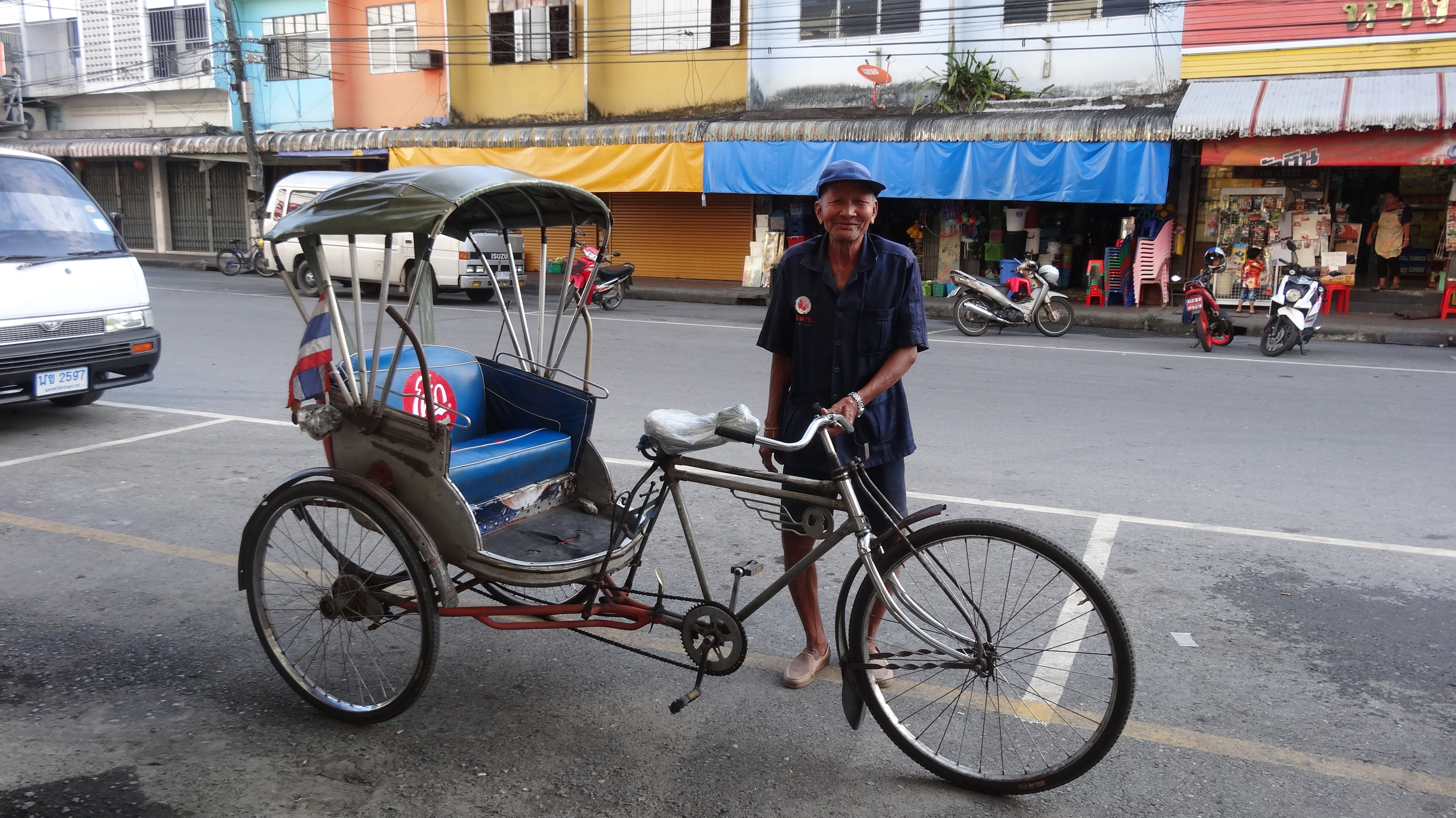
Rickshaw, Thailand

In Thailand, any three-wheeler is called samlor (Thai: สามล้อ, lit. 'three wheels'), whether motorised or not, including pedicabs, motorcycles with attached vending carts or sidecars, etc. The driver is also called samlor.

==== Vietnam ====
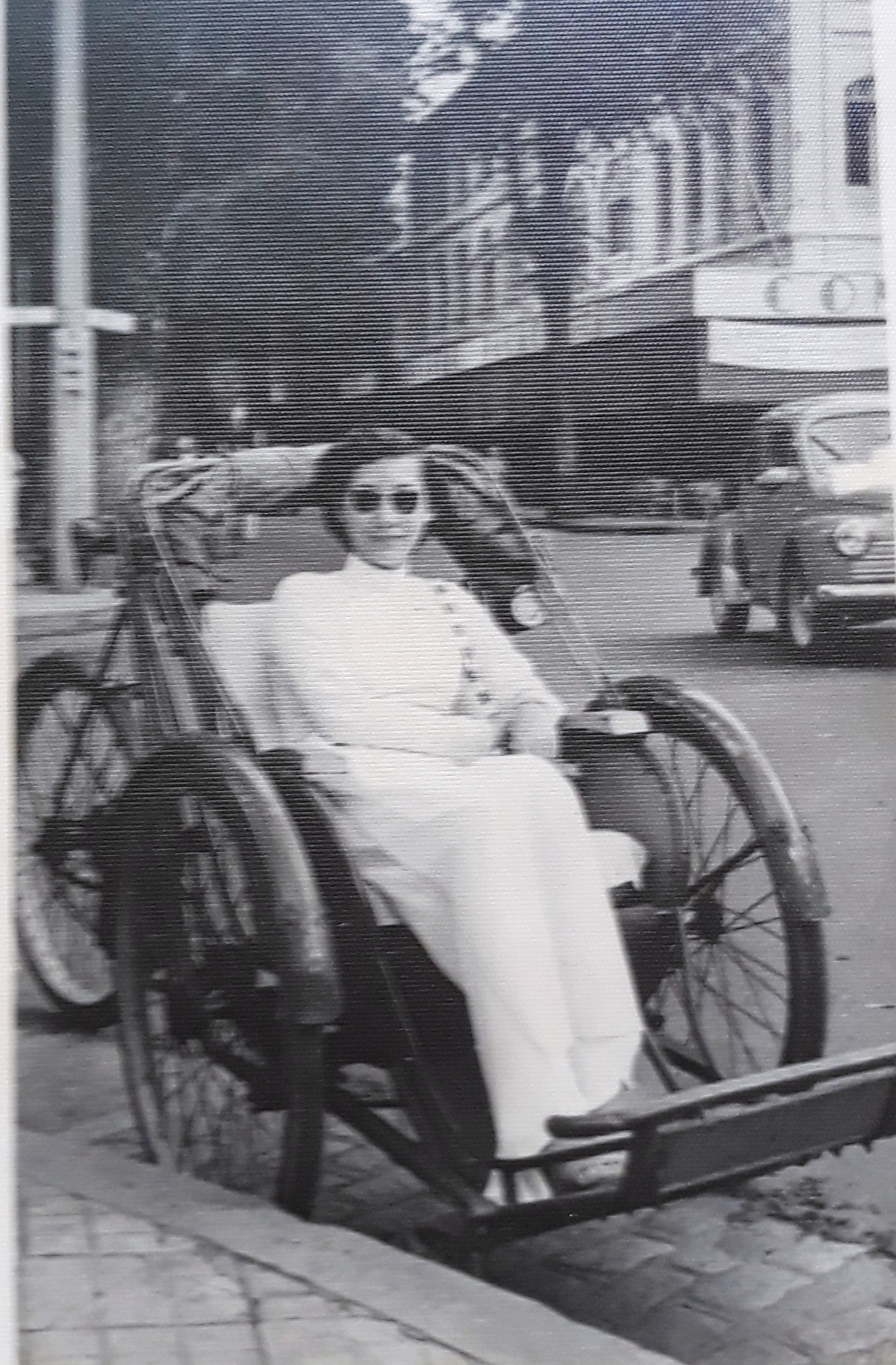
A lady in a traditional Áo dài on an originally-designed xích lô, 1939

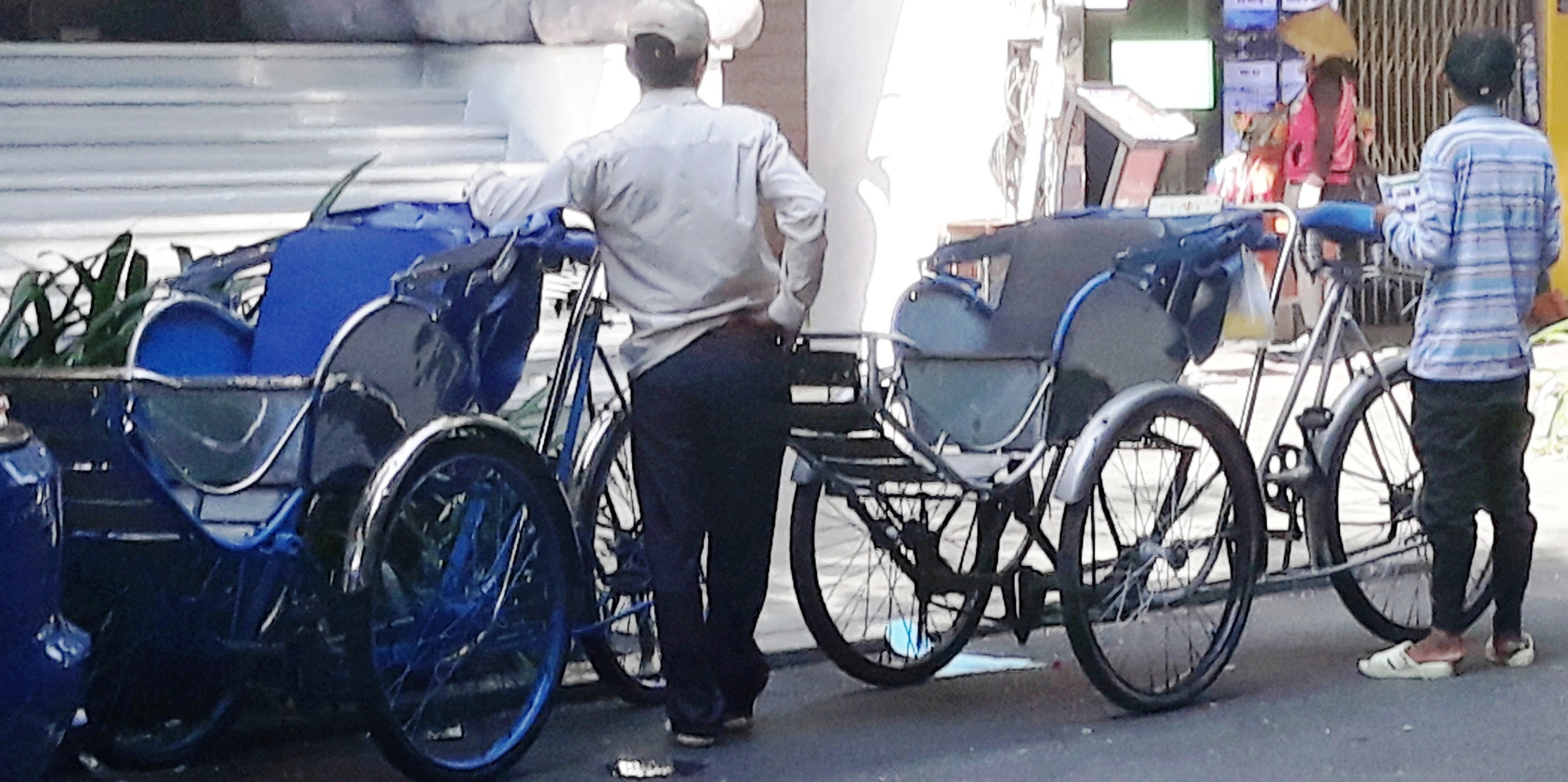
From 1976, cyclos of Ho Chi Minh City and other provinces are re-designed a higher carriage for both goods and passengers transport.

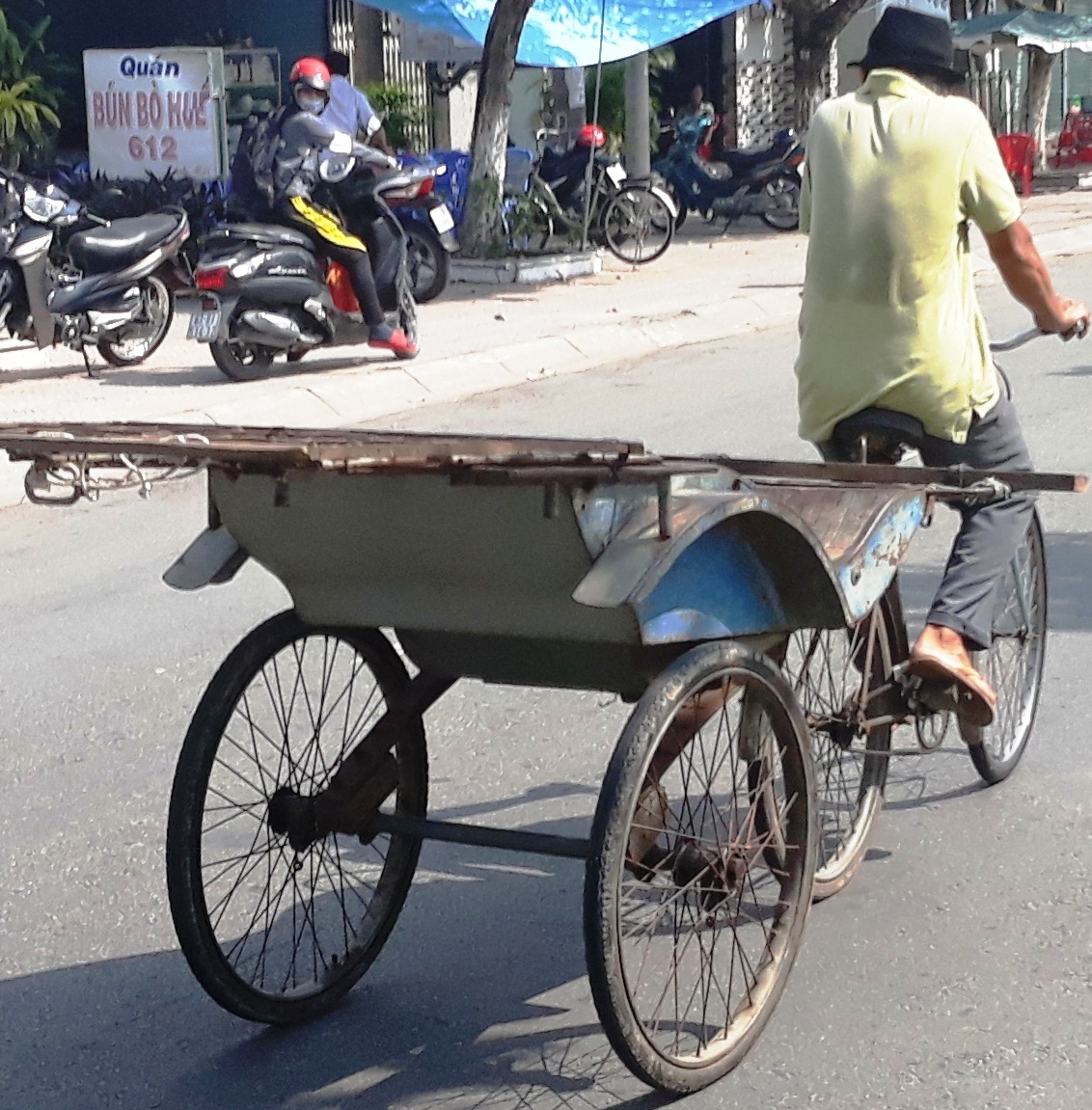
Xe Lôi of the Mekong Delta

Cycle rickshaws are known as xích lô (pronounced sick-low, from the French cyclo) in Vietnam. Cyclo was an invention of a French named P. Coupeaid, which was introduced in Cambodia and Saigon in 1939. From 2008 to 03/2012, due to the traffic obstruction, cyclos were totally forbidden in Ho Chi Minh City and other provinces, except cyclo tours organised by tourist agencies. Another similar vehicle, a pedicab called xe lôi of the Mekong Delta, are now rarely found in some provinces such as Sóc Trăng, Vĩnh Long, and Châu Đốc. They are on their way to disappear.

Cyclo, a 1995 film about a cyclo driver, won the Golden Lion at the 52nd Venice International Film Festival.

Beyond their practical utility, cyclos held cultural significance in Saigon. They appeared in literature, art, and cinema, becoming emblematic of the city's identity. From romantic rendezvous to everyday commutes, cyclos featured prominently in the daily lives of Saigonese residents.

Despite the challenges, efforts are underway to preserve the legacy of cyclo in Saigon. Some organizations are restoring vintage models, while others are promoting eco-friendly alternatives to traditional cyclos. These initiatives aim to celebrate the cultural heritage of these iconic vehicles and ensure their continued presence in the city.

=== Europe ===
Cycle rickshaws, also called pedicabs, are used in most large continental European cities.

==== Denmark ====
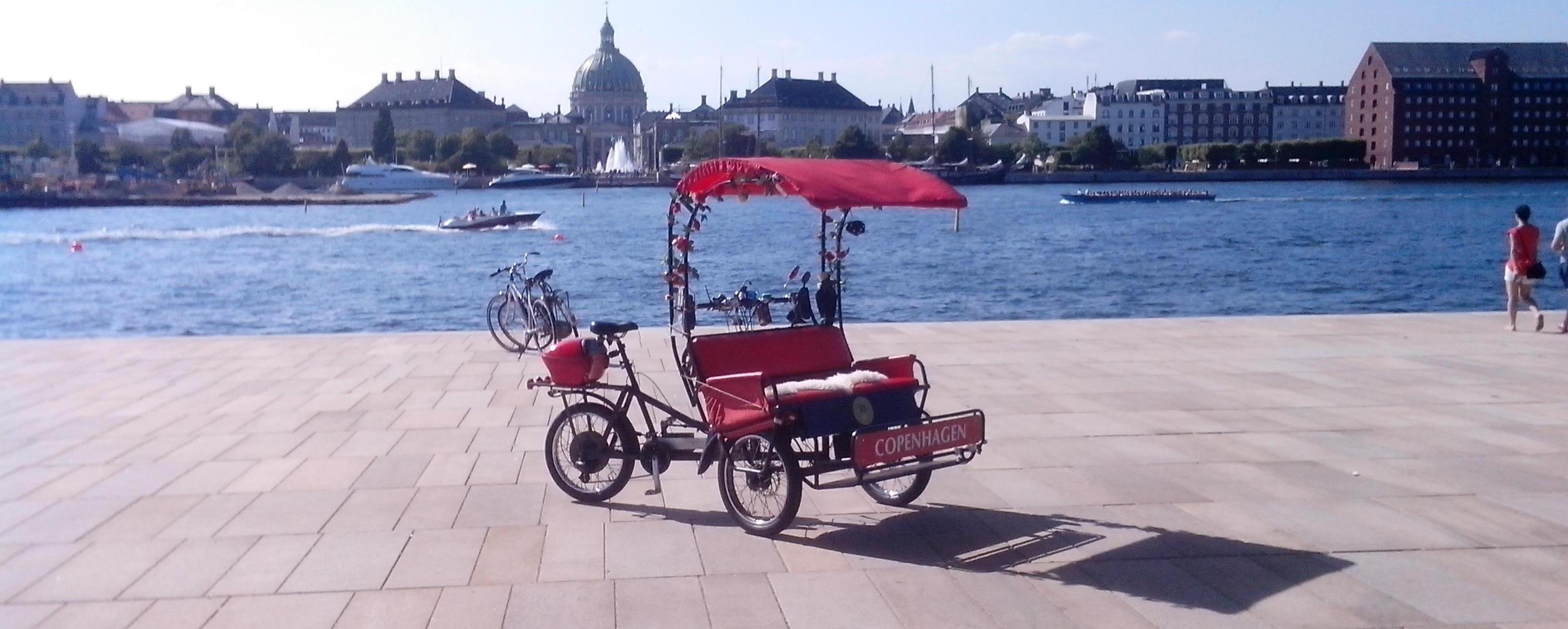
Rickshaw in Copenhagen, Denmark, in 2014

Copenhagen and Odense have pedicab service.

==== Finland ====
Cycle rickshaws are available for rent at Kaivopuisto in Helsinki. The rental company brought the vehicles from the city of Lappeenranta in 2009.

==== France ====
Most French cities have one or more pedicabs, locally known as PussPuss or VeloTaxi. Most common in Paris, Nantes, Lyon, Montpellier and Valence, these cities operate one or more units. France have pedicab vendors.

==== Germany ====
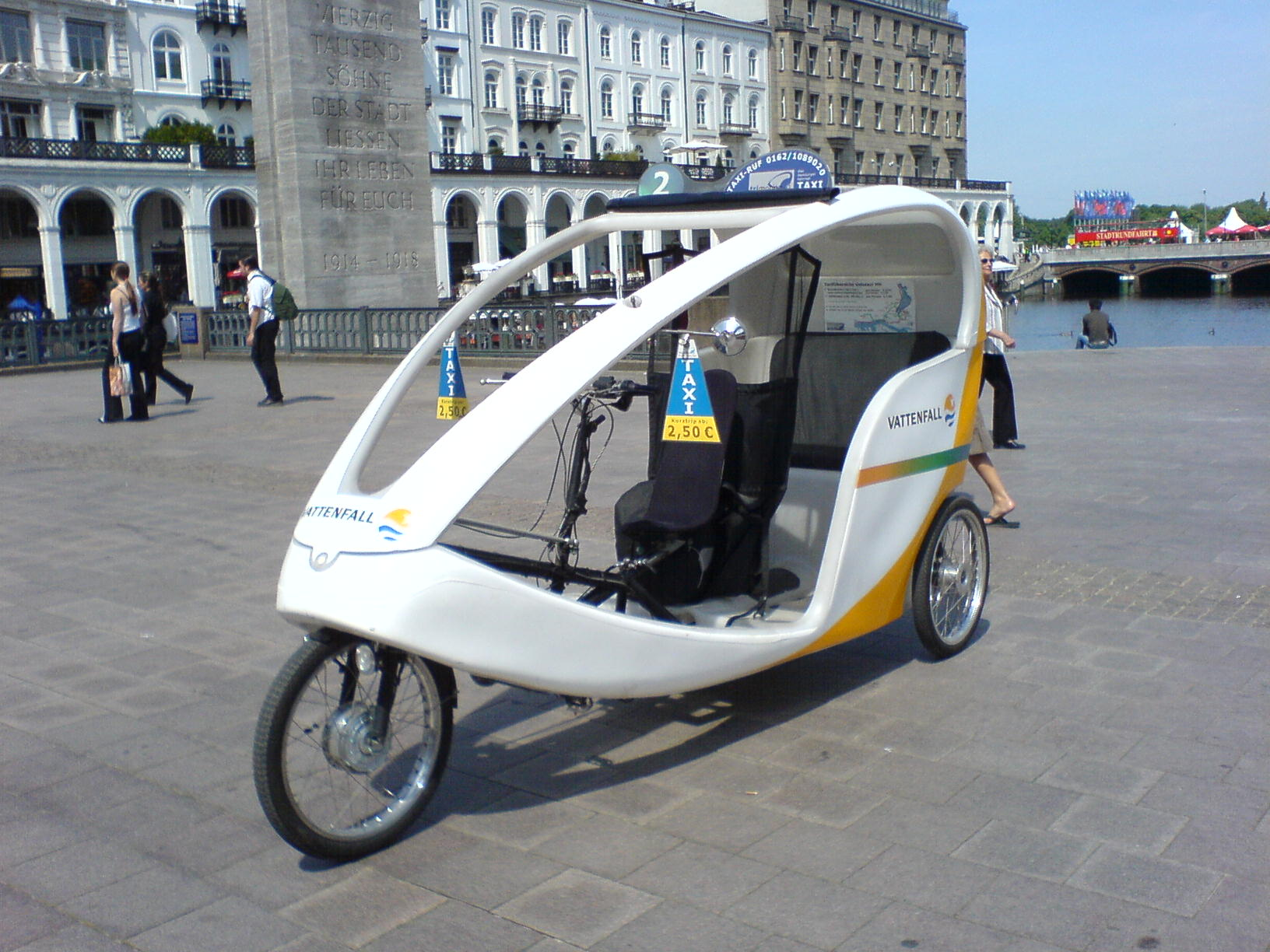
A Velotaxi cycle rickshaw in Hamburg, Germany

Lake Constance, Berlin, Frankfurt, Dresden, and Hamburg offer cycle rickshaw, also called pedicab, service.

===== Velotaxi =====
In the 1990s, German-made cycle rickshaws called velotaxis were created. They are about 1/3 to 1/2 the cost of regular taxis. Velotaxis are three-wheeled vehicles with a "space-age lightweight plastic cab that is open on both sides", a space for a driver, and behind the driver, space for two passengers. They have been made in Berlin, Germany, by Ludger Matuszewski, the founder of "Velotaxi GmbH" company. Velotaxis are often used for group functions like weddings. Under German traffic laws, transporting people on bicycles was forbidden.

===== Electric-assist pedicabs =====
Berlin's Senate, police, and taxi associations finally agreed that the "cult-flitzer" could be integrated into the city's traffic flow. Germany's highest court later ruled that transporting people on bikes was legal. It is a modern and newly designed pedicab (CityCruiser) with a 500-watt electric assist motor. Although these electric-assist pedicabs were engineered in Germany they are manufactured in the Czech Republic and some clones are now also produced in China. The Chinese clone can be purchased for about 3,000 US dollars; the German original is around 6,000 US dollars (the newest version, 9000+ €). The batteries last about 4 hours with a full charge. As with a few recumbent and semi-recumbent designs, some drivers may suffer with knee and joint pain due to the weight of the vehicle (145 kg).

==== Hungary ====
Pedicab service is available in Budapest.

==== Ireland ====
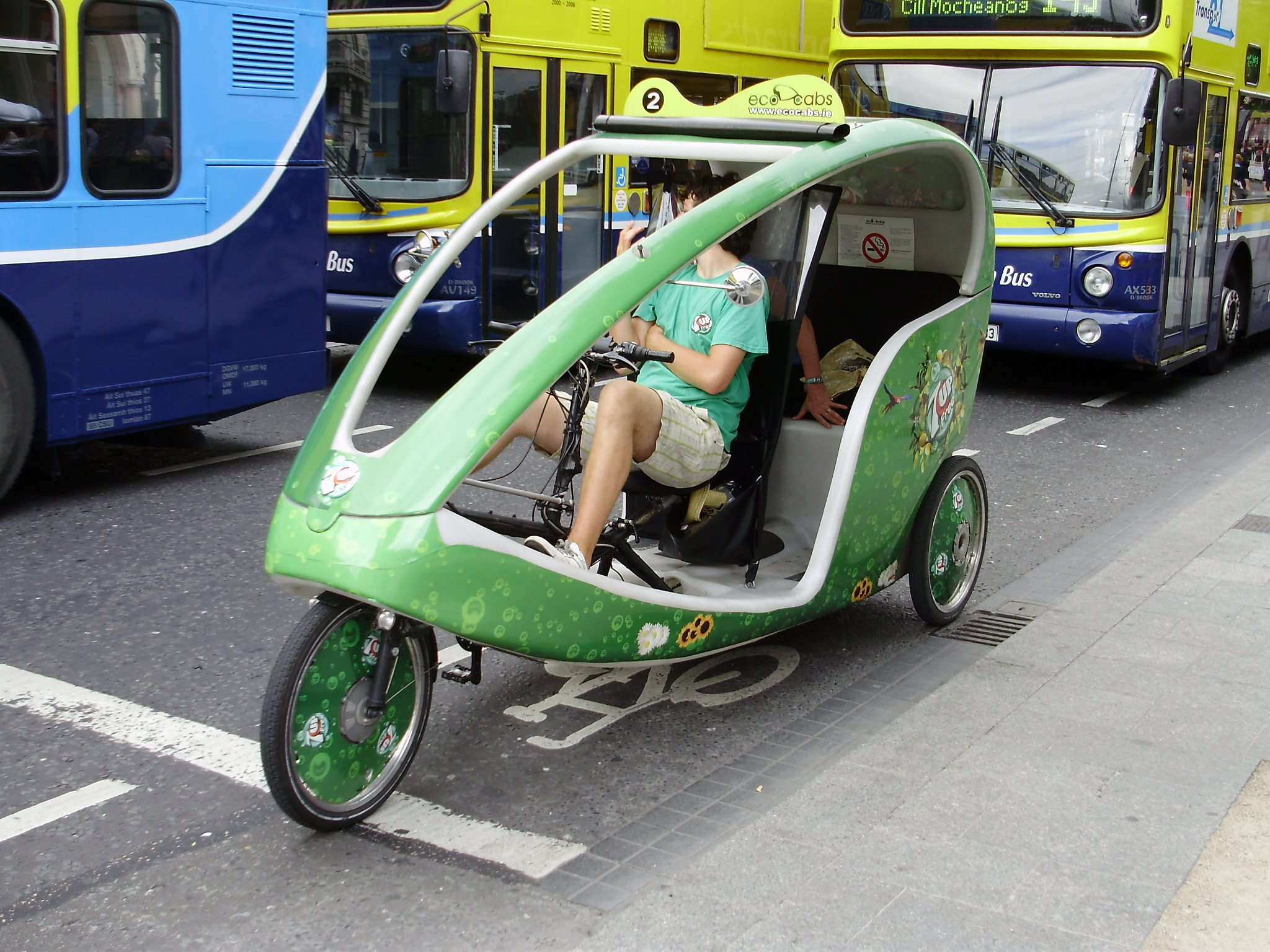
Cycle rickshaw in Dublin

Pedicabs operate in Cork and Dublin, Ireland. (Note: In 1994, a wine-club owner named B. McDonald started Pedicabs Ireland with twelve imported pedicab rickshaws. Sponsored pedicabs on the streets of Dublin give free rides to passengers, as the revenue generated from the advertisements on these pedicabs gives a wage to the drivers. Yellow pedicabs are available in Galway.)

==== Italy ====
Pedicab service is available in Florence, Milan, Rome, Bari.

==== The Netherlands ====
Pedicab service is available in Amsterdam, The Hague and in the Caribbean, at Willemstad.

Thomas Lundy of Amsterdam adapted his battery-electric assisted cycle rickshaw to become what he terms "semi-solar powered", resulting in a video report on Reuters.

==== Norway ====
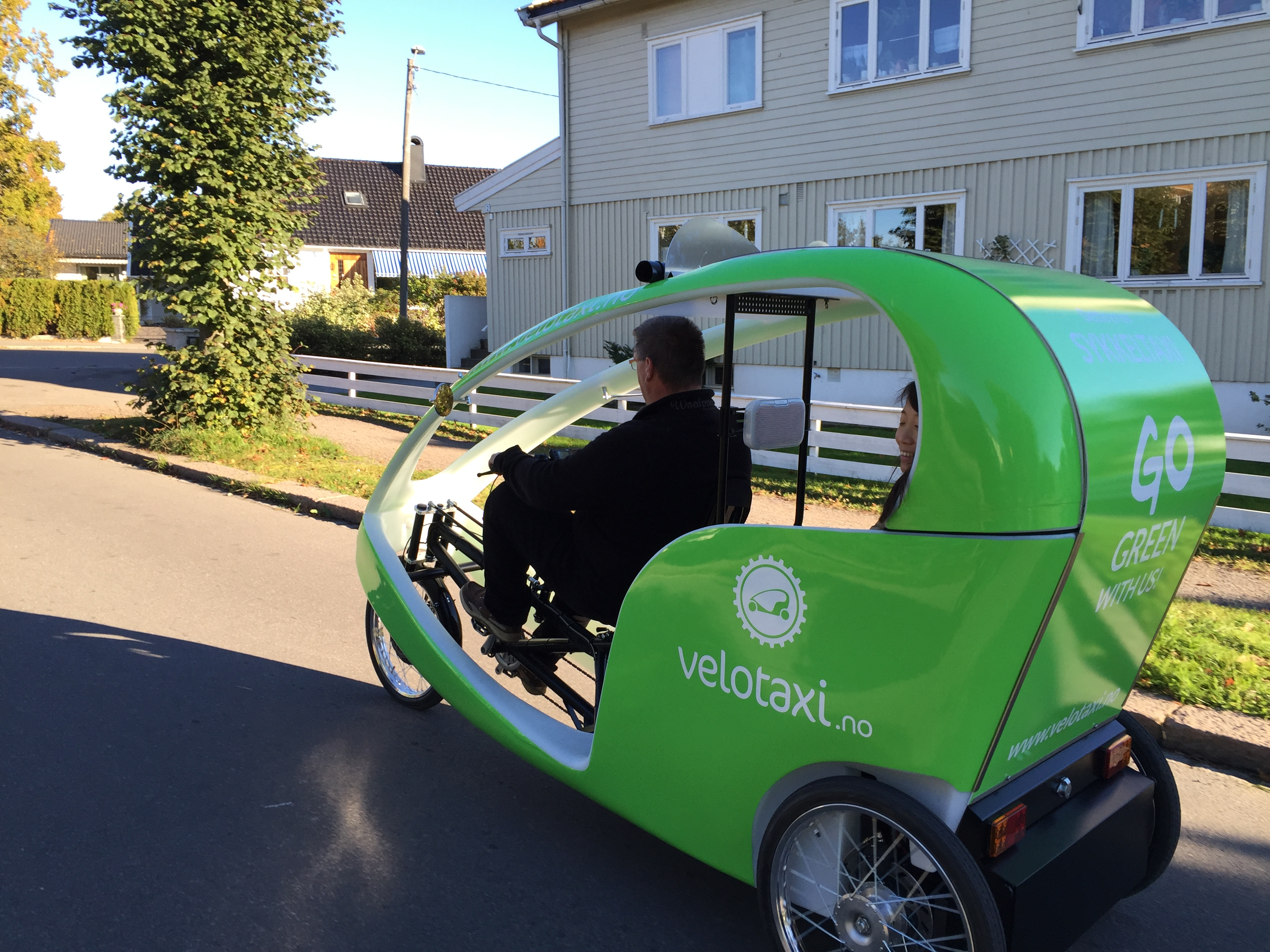
A velotaxi operating in Tønsberg, Norway

Pedicab service is available in Oslo, Fredrikstad, Bergen, Porsgrunn, and Tønsberg.

==== Poland ====
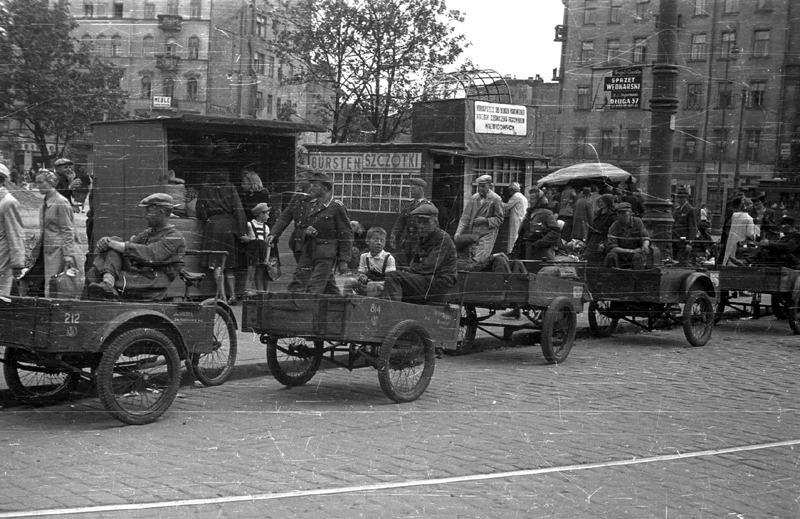
Cycle rickshaws in Warsaw during World War II

During World War II, when Poland was under Nazi German occupation, the German authorities confiscated most privately owned cars and many of the streetcars and buses. Because of that, public transport was partially replaced by cycle rickshaws, at first improvised and with time mass-produced by bicycle factories. Cycle rickshaws became popular in Warsaw and by the start of the Warsaw Uprising were a common sight on the city's streets.

Pedicabs still can be found in most large cities in Poland from Łódź to Warsaw.

==== Spain ====
Alicante, Barcelona, Zaragoza, Málaga, San Sebastian, and Seville have pedicab service.

==== United Kingdom ====
Cycle rickshaws operate in central London, including Soho, Piccadilly, Leicester Square, and Covent Garden. Pedal Me is a pedicab company using electric cargo bikes to transport passengers and cargo across Central and Inner London. In 2024, Transport for London was given powers to regulate pedicabs, including fare control, vehicle standards and driver licensing.

Rickshaws and pedicabs are found in the centre of Edinburgh where vendors are hired like taxis and provide tours. Pedicabs and their variants are also available in Oxford.

== Economic, social and political aspects ==
=== Economics ===
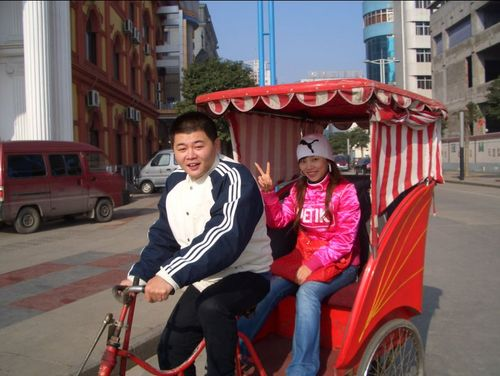
Modern cycle rickshaw in Beijing Street

In many Asian cities where they are widely used, cycle rickshaw driving provides essential employment for recent immigrants from rural areas, generally impoverished men. One study in Bangladesh showed that cycle rickshaw driving was connected with some increases in income for poor agricultural labourers who moved to urban areas, but that the extreme physical demands of the job meant that these benefits decreased for long-term drivers. In Jakarta, most cycle rickshaw drivers in the 1980s were former landless agricultural labourers from rural areas of Java.

In 2003, Dhaka cycle rickshaw drivers earned an estimated average of Tk 143 (US$2.38) per day, of which they paid about Tk 50 (US$0.80) to rent the cycle rickshaw for a day. Older, long-term drivers earned substantially less. A 1988–89 survey found that Jakarta drivers earned a daily average of Rp. 2722 (US$1.57). These wages, while widely considered very low for such physically demanding work, do in some situations compare favourably to jobs available to unskilled workers.

In many cities, most drivers do not own their own cycle rickshaws; instead, they rent them from their owners, some of whom own many cycle rickshaws. Driver-ownership rates vary widely. In Delhi, a 1980 study found only one per cent of drivers owned their vehicles, but ownership rates in several other Indian cities were much higher, including fifteen per cent in Hyderabad and twenty-two per cent in Faridabad. A 1977 study in Chiang Mai, Thailand found that 44% of cycle rickshaw drivers were owners. In Bangladesh, driver-ownership is usually highest in rural areas and lowest in the larger cities. Most cycle rickshaws in that country are owned by individuals who have only one or two of them, but some owners in the largest cities own several hundred.

=== Social aspects ===
In 2012 Ole Kassow, a resident of Copenhagen, wanted to help the elderly get back on their bicycles, but he had to find a solution to their limited mobility. The answer was a cycle rickshaw, and he started offering free cycle rickshaw rides to residents of a nearby nursing home. He then got in touch with a civil society consultant at the City of Copenhagen, Dorthe Pedersen, who was intrigued by the idea, and together they bought five cycle rickshaws and launched an organisation called Cycling Without Age, which has now spread to all corners of Denmark, and since 2015 to another 50 countries around the world.

=== Legislation ===
Some countries and cities have banned or restricted cycle rickshaws. They are often prohibited in congested areas of major cities. For example, they were banned in Bangkok in the mid-1960s as not fitting the modern image of the city being promoted by the government. In Dhaka and Jakarta, they are no longer permitted on major roads, but are still used to provide transportation within individual urban neighbourhoods. They are banned entirely in Pakistan. While they have been criticised for causing congestion, cycle rickshaws are also often hailed as environmentally-friendly, inexpensive modes of transportation.

In Taiwan, the Road Traffic Security Rules require pedicabs to be registered by their owners with the police before they can be legally driven on public roads, or risk an administrative fine of 300 new Taiwan dollars (TWD). Their drivers must carry the police registration documents or risk a fine of 180 TWD, but no driver licence is required. The administrative fines are based on Articles 69 and 71 of the Act Governing the Punishment of Violation of Road traffic Regulations. As Taiwanese road traffic is now heavily motorised, most pedicabs have been replaced by taxicabs, but they can still be found at limited places, such as Cijin District of Kaohsiung City.

Electric-assist pedicabs were banned in New York City in January 2008; the city council decided to allow pedicabs propelled only by muscle power. The city of Toronto, Ontario, Canada, has decided not to issue permits to electric-assist pedicabs.

== Arts ==
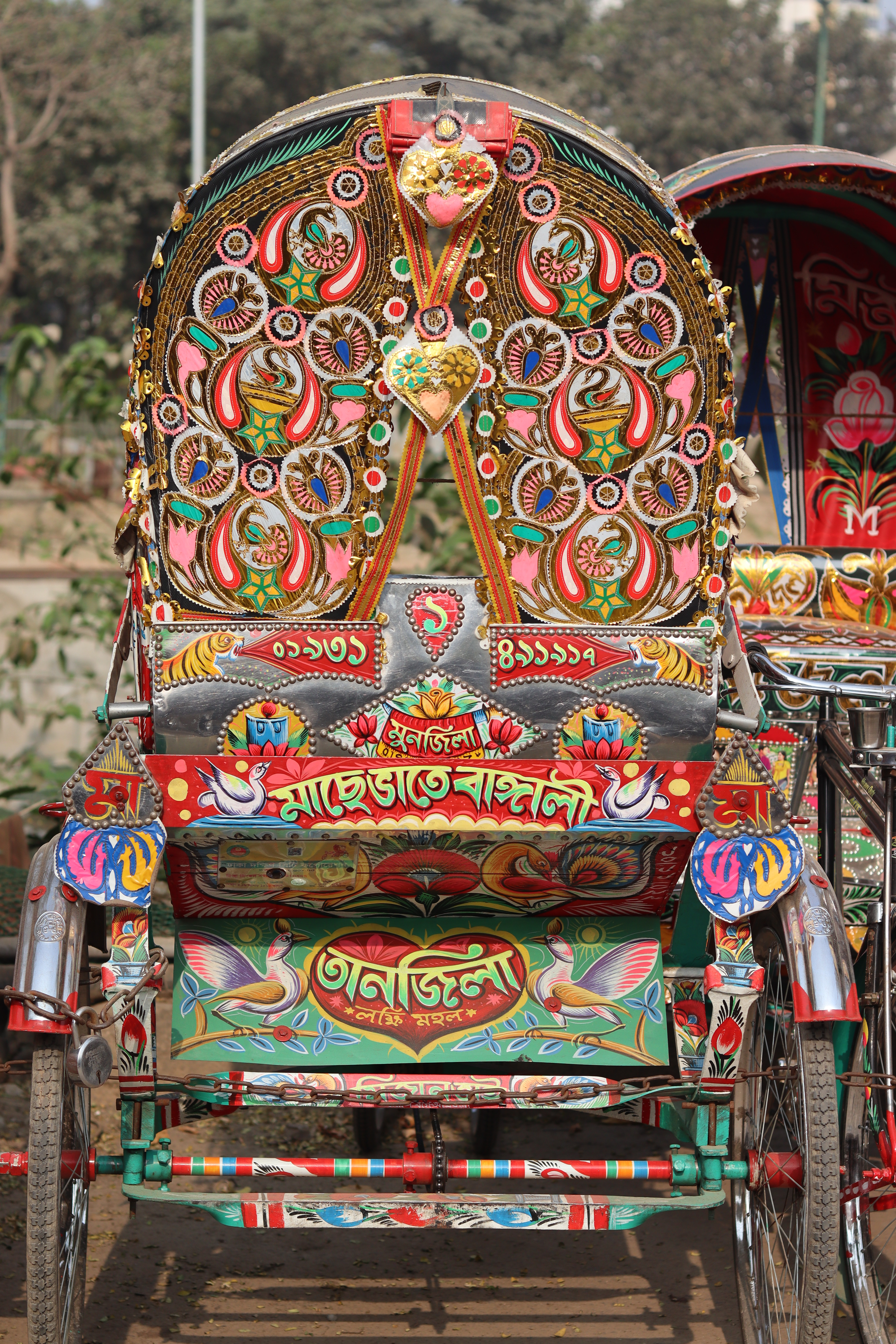
Decoration of a cycle rickshaw in Dhaka

As a key part of the urban landscape in many cities, cycle rickshaws have been the subject of films and other artwork, as well as being extensively decorated themselves. The cycle rickshaw in Dhaka is especially well known as a major medium for Bengali folk art, as plasticine cutouts and handpainted figures adorn many cycle rickshaws.

Films featuring cycle rickshaws and their drivers include Kickboxer and Sammo Hung's 1989 martial arts film Pedicab Driver, which dealt with a group of pedicab drivers and their problems with romance and organised crime. Cyclo, a 1995 film by Vietnamese director Tran Anh Hung, is centered on a cycle rickshaw driver. Tollywood films with cycle rickshaw themes include Orey Rickshaw ("Orey" literally means "Hey", in a derogatory tone), which tells a story sympathising with the downtrodden, and Rickshavodu ("Rickshaw Guy").

== Gallery ==
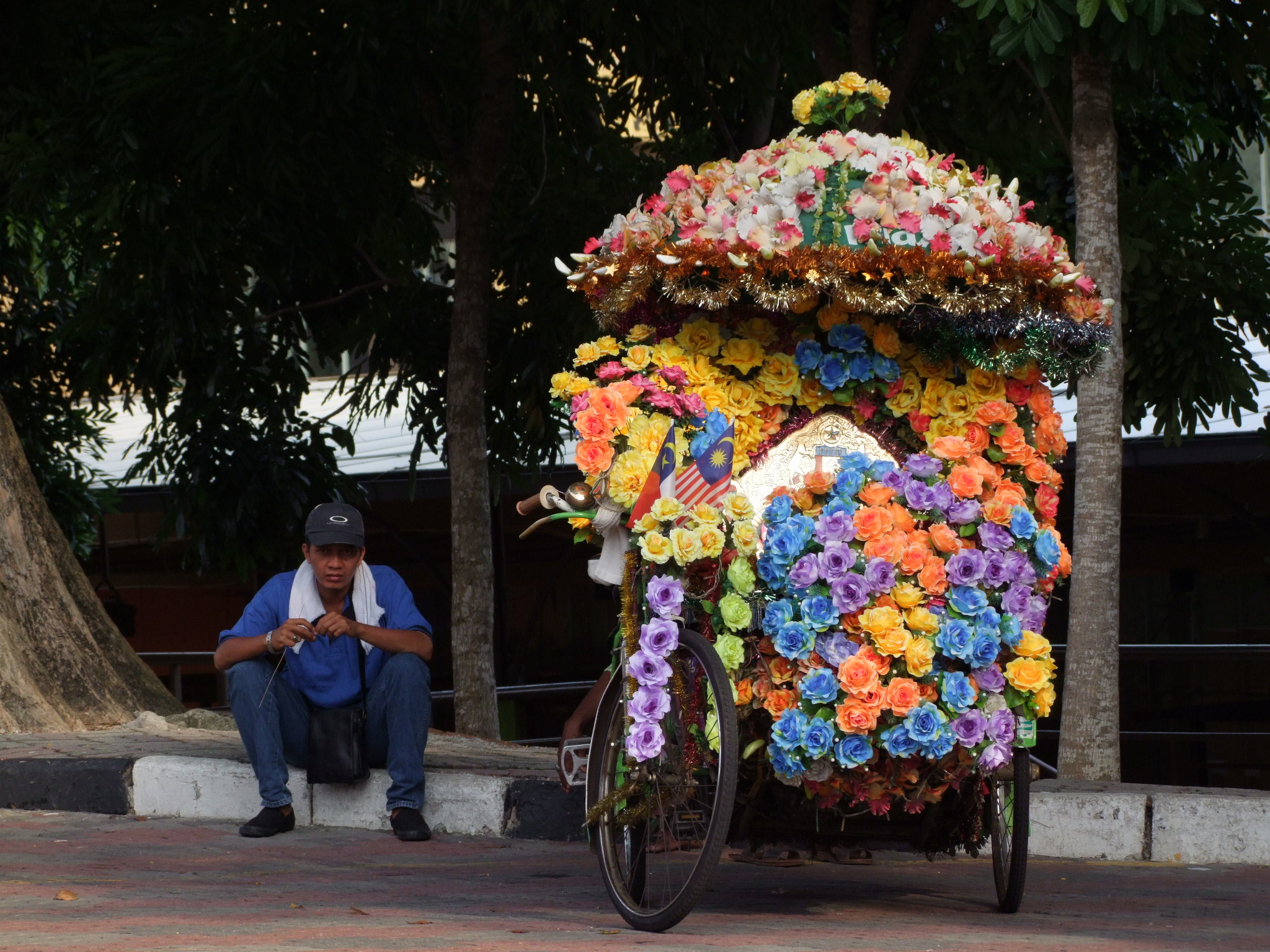
An extensively decorated trishaw in Melaka

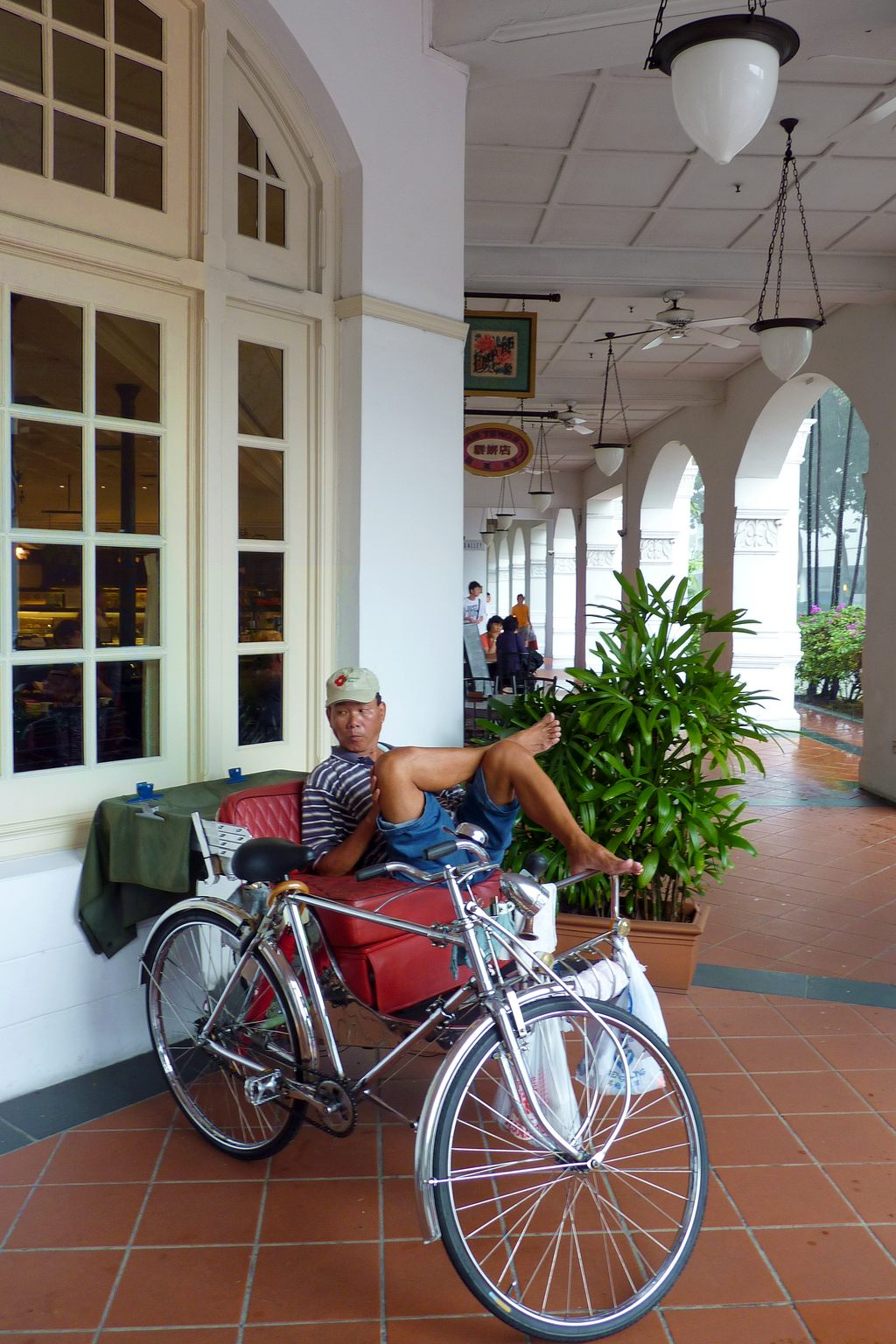
A trishaw and rider at the Raffles Hotel in Singapore

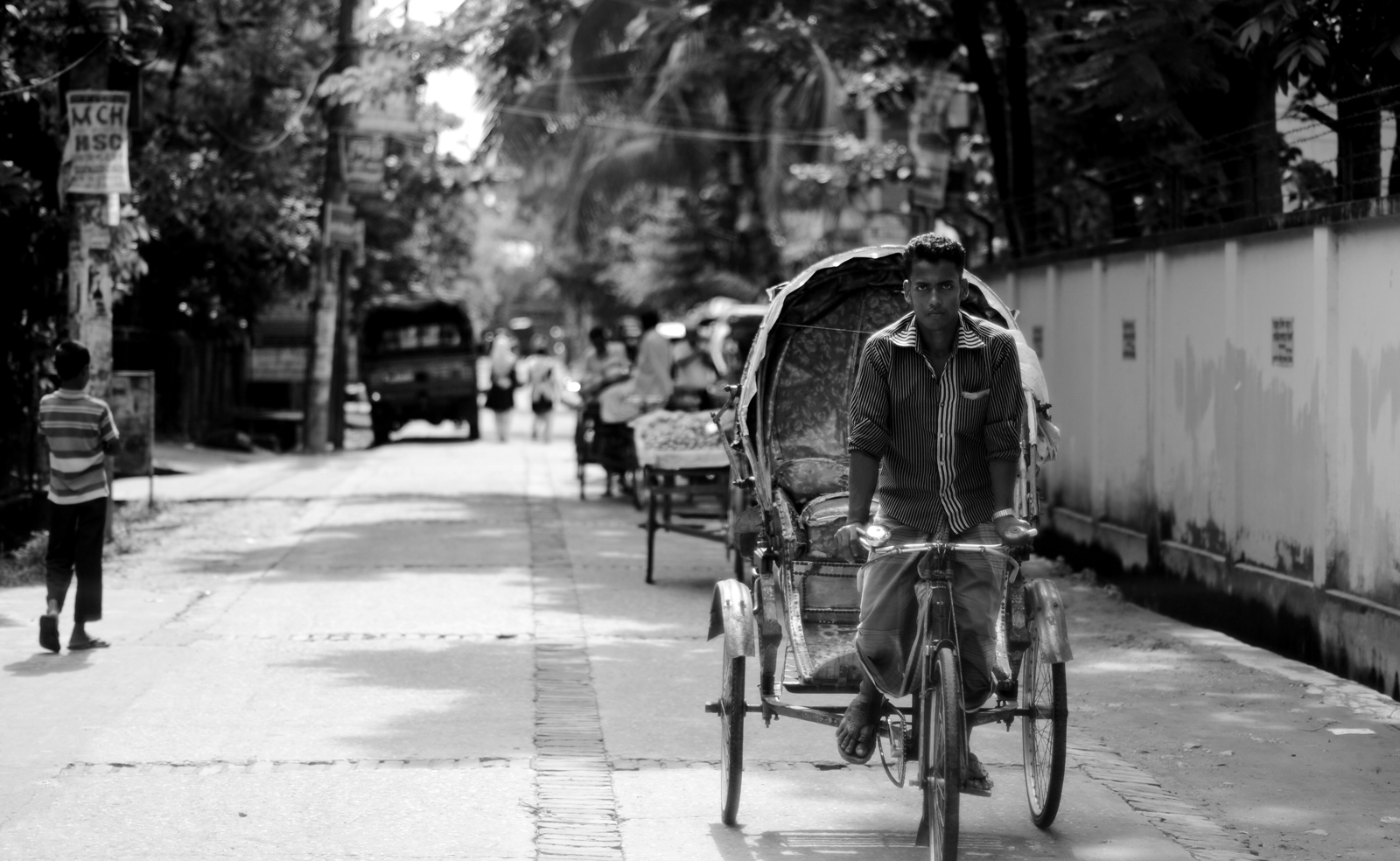
A Cycle rickshaw puller in Chittagong, Bangladesh

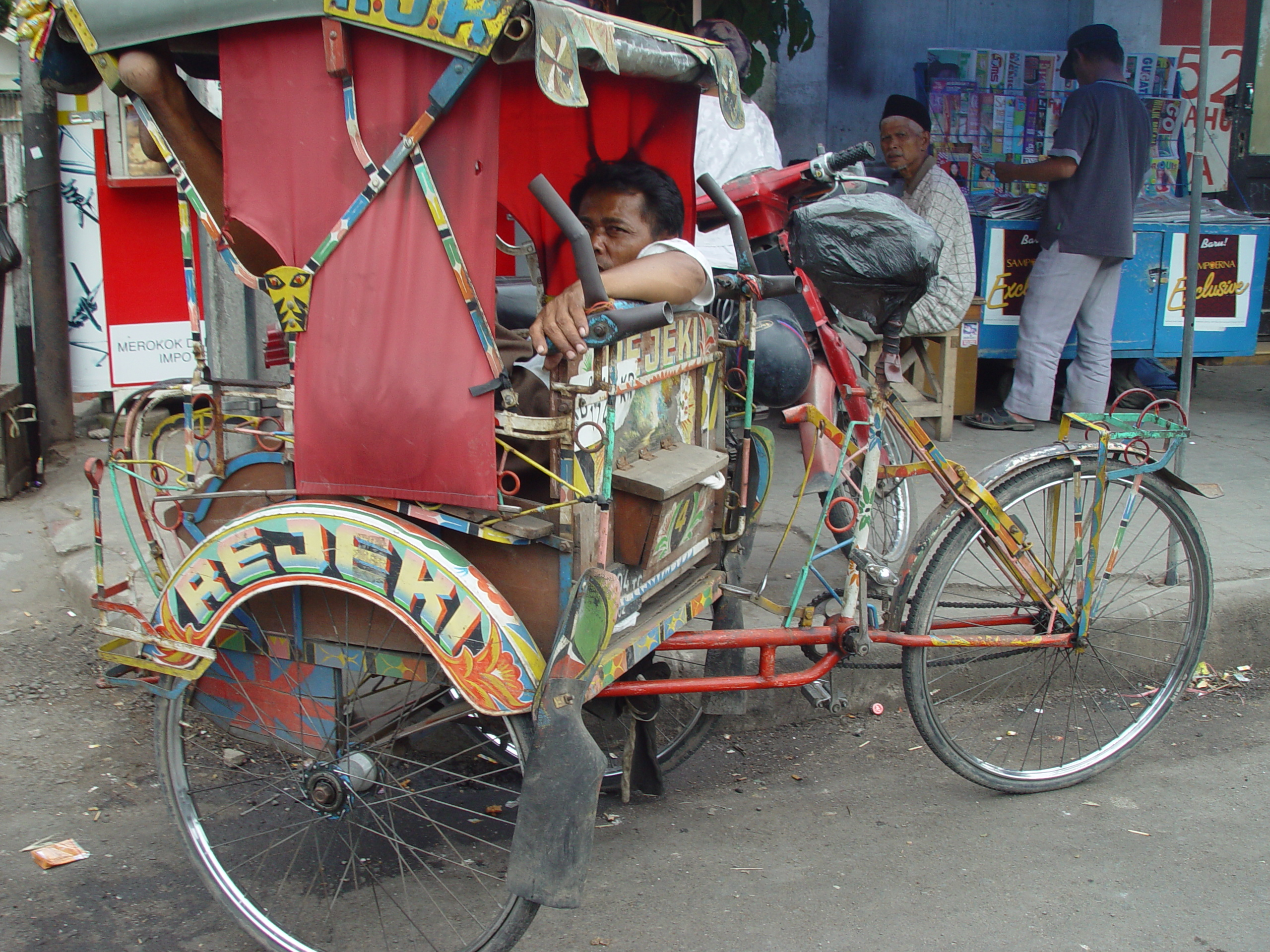
A becak and its driver wait for a fare in Bandung, Indonesia

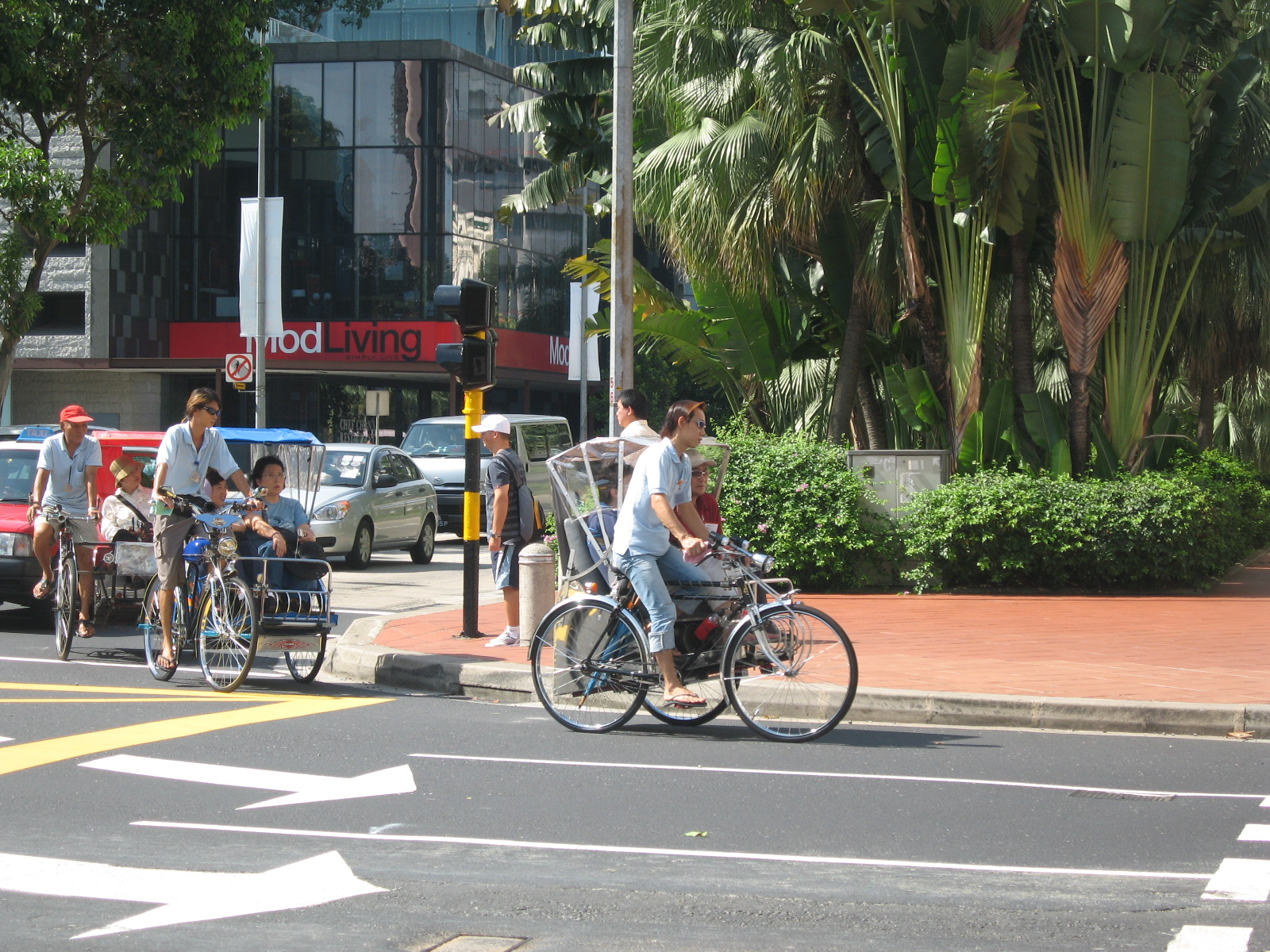
Trishaws are used to ferry tourists around the city for sightseeing in Singapore

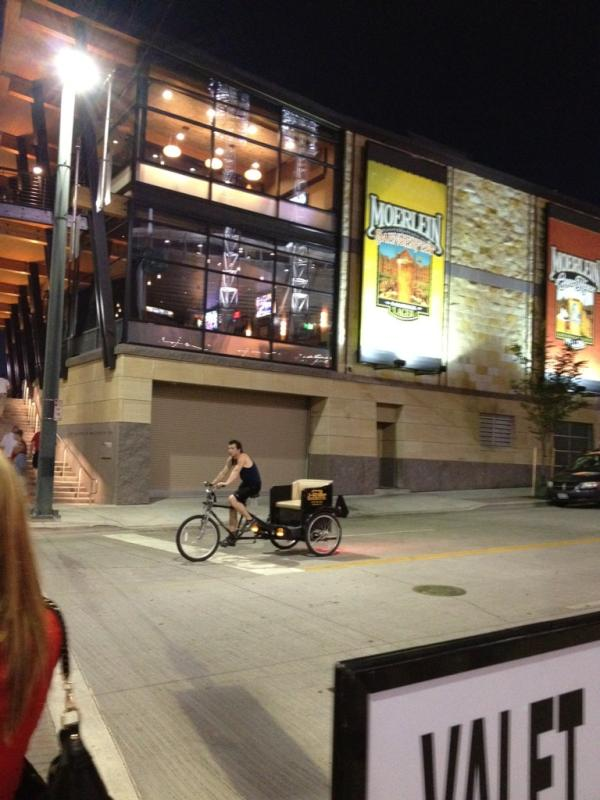
Cycle Rickshaw in downtown Cincinnati, Ohio

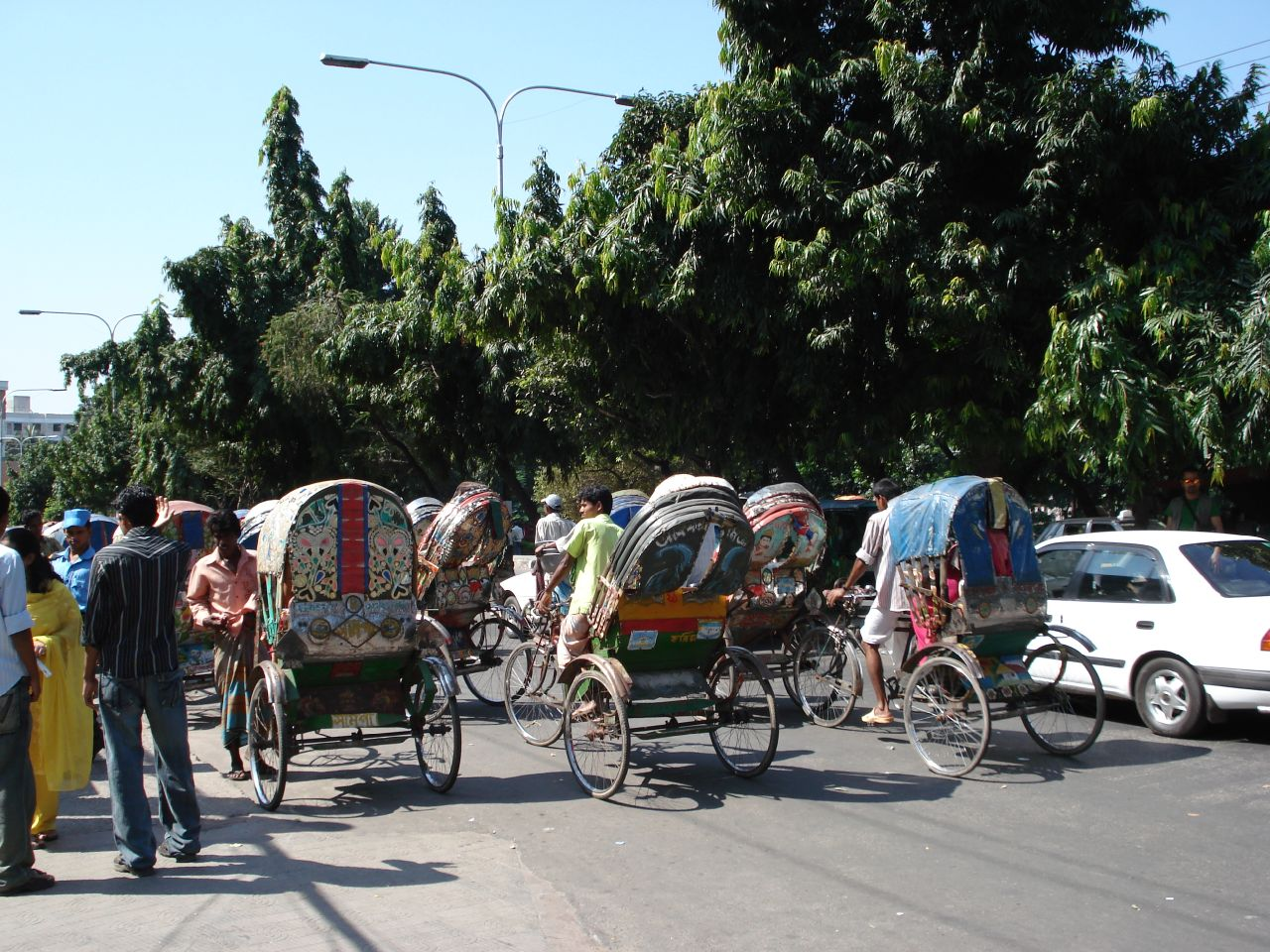
Cycle rickshaws in Dhaka, Bangladesh

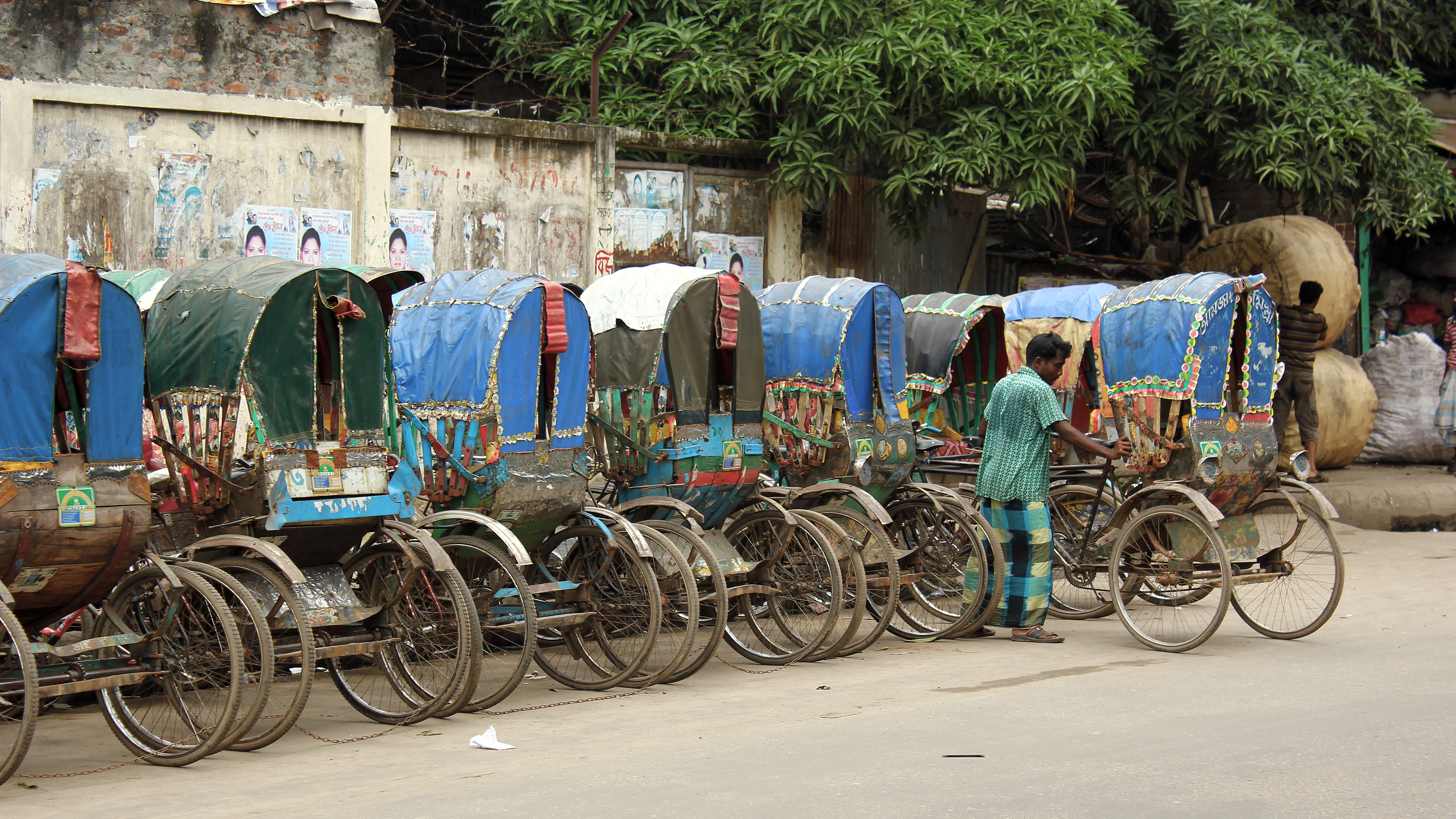
Cycle rickshaw parking in Bangladesh

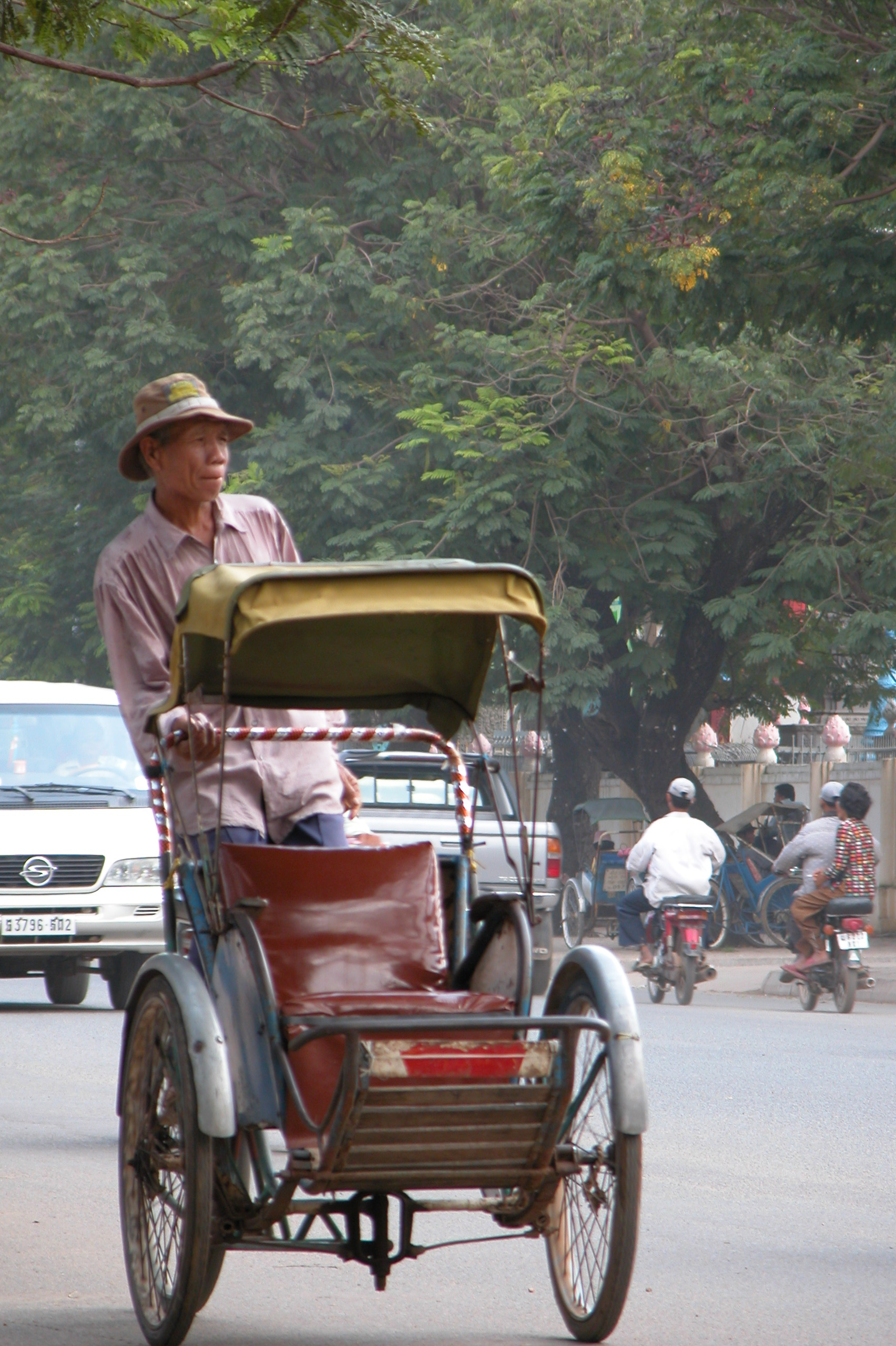
A cycle rickshaw driver in Phnom Penh, Cambodia

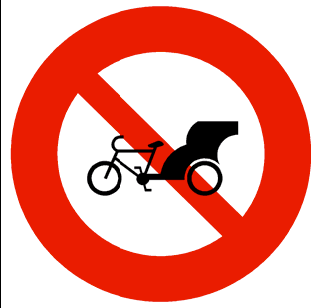
Taiwanese Prohibitory Sign P9: No Pedicabs

== See also ==
- Boda boda (bicycle taxi)
- Party bike
- Tandem bicycle
- Trailer bike
- Utility cycling
- Rickshaw art
- George Bliss (pedicab designer)
