= Pedal Me =

Logistics and taxi company in London

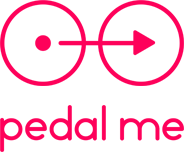
- Industry: Logistics and Pedicab
- Founded: 2017
- Founders: Benjamin Knowles; Christopher Dixon; Robert Sargent
- Headquarters: London, U.K.
- Key people: Benjamin Knowles (CEO); Russell Edwards (Head of Technology); Greg Holland (Head of Operations)
- Website: www.pedalme.co.uk

Pedal Me is an e-cargo bike logistics company in London. The company was founded in 2017 by Benjamin Knowles, a transport planner, Rob Sargent, an astrophysicist and technologist, and Chris Dixon, a National Standards Instructor for Cycling.

The company normally operates within 9 miles of Central London, using bikes built by Urban Arrow in the Netherlands. The company offers cargo deliveries, which have significantly outstripped the number of journeys carrying passengers. In a trial run by TfL, the company's riders dropped off construction materials from Wood Green to Whitechapel faster than a van. The contractor plans to continue receiving deliveries by bike. In May 2019, the charity Sustrans decided to use Pedal Me to move all of their office equipment 2.7 miles across London.

The company employed 45 people in 2019 and had 42 bikes in its fleet.

In February 2024, Pedalme entered administration wiping out all of its shareholders citing unpaid tax bills. The company was bought out of administration by a number of existing shareholders, but crowdfunding backers were not included in the deal.

== Coronavirus lockdown ==
During the lockdown in April and May 2020, Pedal Me partnered with Lambeth Council to deliver 10,000 care packages to the individuals and families most in need. This was the largest operation conducted in Pedal Me's history, and perhaps the single largest e-cargo bike logistics operation in the UK. In total, the Pedal Me fleet covered over 20,000 km to distribute nearly 10,000 packages, moving around about 150,000 kg across the borough of Lambeth.

In December 2020, Pedal Me said that they were opening a 6,500sq ft warehouse in Zone 1 to support their freight operations. In February 2021, Pedal Me offered free rides to Londoners going to and from their COVID vaccinations.
