= Matt Lange discography =

- Studio albums: 2
- EPs: 11
- Singles: 33
- Compilation albums: 1
- Remixes: 46

This is the discography of American DJ and producer Matt Lange. Lange has released two studio albums, eleven extended plays, 33 singles, and 46 remixes.

== Studio albums ==
Title	Details
Ephemera	Released: September 10, 2015; Label: Mau5trap; Format: Digital download, CD
Isolated	Released: October 27, 2020; Label: Isorhythm; Format: Digital download
Dichotomy	Released: August 5, 2022; Label: Isorhythm; Format: Digital download

== Compilation albums ==
Title	Details
Anjunadeep pres. Matt Lange 01	Released: March 19, 2013; Label: Anjunadeep; Format: Digital download, CD

== Extended plays ==
=== As lead artist ===
Title	Details
Sixty Six	Released: August 15, 2011; Label: Isorhythm; Format: Digital download
Here & Back Again	Released: January 31, 2012; Label: Isorhythm; Format: Digital download
Stacatto	Released: July 14, 2014; Label: Anjunadeep; Format: Digital download
Patchwork	Released: April 16, 2016; Label: Mau5trap; Format: Digital download
Escapist	Released: March 31, 2017; Label: Mau5trap; Format: Digital download
Punish Me	Released: April 13, 2017; Label: Isorhythm; Format: Digital download
Bleed Together	Released: December 13, 2017; Label: Isorhythm; Format: Digital download
Diversions	Released: April 13, 2018; Label: Isorhythm; Format: Digital download
Space Between	Released: March 13, 2019; Label: Mau5trap; Format: Digital download
Isn't It Lovely	Released: November 20, 2019; Label: Anjunabeats; Format: Digital download

=== As Altered Tensions ===
Title	Details
Altered Tensions (The Answer to the Question You Forgot to Ask)	Released: December 3, 2012; Label: Isorhythm; Format: Digital download

== Singles ==
List of singles, showing year released and album name
Title	Year	Album
"Anywhere With You is Home" (featuring Kerry Leva)	2009	Non-album singles
"East Coast / Resonate"	2010	Non-album singles
"Avenue / Cables Out"	2010	Non-album singles
"As the Rain Falls" (with Ad Brown)	2010	Non-album singles
"Move So Fast"	2010	Non-album singles
"Quadcore" (with Boom Jinx, Andrew Bayer and Trifonic)	2011	Anjunadeep pres. Matt Lange 01
"A Deeper Shade / Other Stories"	2011	Anjunadeep pres. Matt Lange 01
"Rift"	2011	Anjunadeep 03
"Bad Year Blimp / Revolver"	2011	Anjunadeep pres. Matt Lange 01
"That Much Higher / Nutclap"	2011	Anjunadeep pres. Matt Lange 01
"The Other Shore" (featuring Christina Soto)	2011	Non-album single
"Avalon / Griffith Park"	2012	Anjunadeep pres. Matt Lange 01
"Bowed / Class B" (with Glenn Morrison)	2012	Non-album single
"Way You Know / Only You"	2013	Anjunadeep 05
"So Cliche"	2014	Non-album singles
"I Can’t Forgive / Inverse / This Is How It Is"	2014	Non-album singles
"There She Goes"	2014	Non-album singles
"Inorganism"	2015	Non-album singles
"My Love Aside"	2015	Ephemera
"Lying to Myself"	2015	Ephemera
"Ripples"	2015	Ephemera
"The Fever" (featuring Quivver)	2015	Ephemera
"Consider This"	2016	Patchwork EP
"Unsettled"	2016	Non-album singles
"All You Need to See"	2017	Non-album singles
"Are You Am I" (featuring Deniz Reno)	2018	Non-album singles
"In Me" (featuring Kerry Leva)	2018	Space Between EP
"...And so On, Surrender"	2018	Non-album singles
"Does This Feel Like Apathy To You"	2019	Non-album singles
"Drift (Dub Mix)"	2019	Non-album singles
"Every Word" (featuring Kerry Leva)	2019	Isn't It Lovely EP
"Pure Ruin"	2019	Non-album singles
"This Is All We Have"	2020	Non-album singles

== Remixes ==
List of remixes, showing year released and original artists
Title	Year	Original artist(s)
"5 Reasons" (Matt Lange Remix)	2009	Sylvia Tosun and Loverush UK
"Face to Face" (Matt Lange Remix)	2009	Kirsty Hawkshaw
"To the Six" (Matt Lange Remix)	2009	Boom Jinx and Andrew Bayer
"Give Me Your Love" (Matt Lange Remix)	2010	Loverush UK (featuring Carla Werner)
"Cosmology" (Matt Lange 'Cosmopolitan' Remix)	2010	Pconvolve
"White Tiger" (Matt Lange Remix)	2010	Schodt (featuring Aida Fenhel)
"Lady Luck (City Lights)" (Matt Lange Remix)	2010	Timo Garcia (featuring Amber Jolene)
"Do For Love" (Matt Lange Remix)	2010	Vinny Troia and Jaidene Veda
"Jonko" (Ad Brown, Matt Lange and Kerry Leva Remix)	2011	Johan Gielen
"Under The Sun" (Matt Lange Remix)	2011	Redanka and Quivver
"Triangle & Strings" (Matt Lange Remix)	2011	Glenn Morrison
"Under the Sun" (Matt Lange Remix)	2011	Redanka and Quivver
"Counting the Points" (Matt Lange Remix)	2011	Andrew Bayer
"Endless Journey" (Matt Lange Remix)	2011	Reverse
"L.A." (Matt Lange Remix)	2012	Ad Brown
"Numb" (Matt Lange Remix)	2012	Usher
"Ascendancy" (Matt Lange Remix)	2012	Neil Davidge
"True Religion" (Matt Lange Remix)	2013	Stan Serkin (featuring Jonny Rose)
"Shadow in the Rose Garden" (Matt Lange Remix)	2013	The M Machine
"Faded Tracks" (Matt Lange Remix)	2013	Kirsty Hawkshaw
"Sex Cult" (Matt Lange Remix)	2013	Black Boots
"The One" (Matt Lange Remix)	2014	Lane 8 (featuring Patrick Baker)
"Illusion" (Matt Lange Remix)	2014	Versa
"Good For Me" (Matt Lange Remix)	2014	Above & Beyond (featuring Zoë Johnston)
"Fire and Honor" (Matt Lange Remix)	2014	Audiomachine
"All That Could've Been" (Matt Lange Remix)	2014	Darin Epsilon (featuring Ghost Wars)
"Infinite Cities" (Matt Lange Remix)	2015	The Bright Light Social Hour
"Discipline" (Matt Lange Remix)	2015	Nine Inch Nails
"Yes, I Was Drunk" (Matt Lange Remix)	2015	Twin Atlantic
"Run-Time" (Matt Lange Remix)	2016	Imogen Heap
"Too Late" (Matt Lange Remix)	2016	Mat Zo
"Hell Is Other People" (Matt Lange Remix)	2016	Eekkoo
"Ritual" (Matt Lange Remix)	2016	Delerium (featuring Phildel)
"This Is What It Feels Like" (Matt Lange Remix)	2016	Armin van Buuren (featuring Trevor Guthrie)
"Burned" (Matt Lange Remix)	2017	Attlas
"Mine & Yours" (Matt Lange Remix)	2017	Glenn Morrison (featuring Elise)
"Lapse" (Matt Lange Unforgiven Remix)	2017	Black Math
"Unite Us" (Matt Lange Remix)	2017	Fringe Element
"Absolute Zero" (Matt Lange Remix)	2017	Fringe Element
"The Fall" (Matt Lange Remix)	2017	Fringe Element
"The Great Divide" (Matt Lange Remix)	2018	Celldweller
"Broken" (Matt Lange Remix)	2018	Trifonic
"Light Up" (Matt Lange Remix)	2018	Hybrid
"Stay" (Matt Lange Remix)	2018	Delerium (featuring Jes)
"Lune" (Matt Lange Remix)	2019	Periphery
"There's a Difference" (Matt Lange Remix)	2019	The Crystal Method (featuring Franky Perez)
"Is It Love? (1001)" (Matt Lange Remix)	2019	Above & Beyond
"Superbia (ov)" (Matt Lange Remix)	2019	Deadmau5
