= Golubkin =

Golubkin (Russian: Голубкин, from голубка meaning pigeon or Dove) is a Russian masculine surname, its feminine counterpart is Golubkina. Adopted as reference to the Holy Spirit. It may refer to:

- Anna Golubkina (1864–1927), Russian impressionist sculptor
- Larisa Golubkina (1940–2025), Soviet and later Russian actress and singer
- Nikolai Golubkin (born 1974), Russian football player

== See also ==
- Golubkina (crater) on Venus
