= Farruh Negmat-Zadeh =

Tajikistani artist (born 1959)

Farruh Negmat-Zade (Tajik: Фаррух Негматзода, Persian: فرخ نعمت‌زاده; born 1959) is a Tajikistani artist. Born in Dushanbe, he graduated from Moscow Art School and from Surikov State Art Institute of Moscow in 1983 and as a member of the Union of Artists of Tajikistan has participated in many international exhibitions.

His works are on display museums and private collections in United States, Netherlands, Syria and North Korea.
