= Moscow School of Painting, Sculpture and Architecture =

Art school in Moscow, Russia

Coordinates: 55.7644°N 37.6362°E

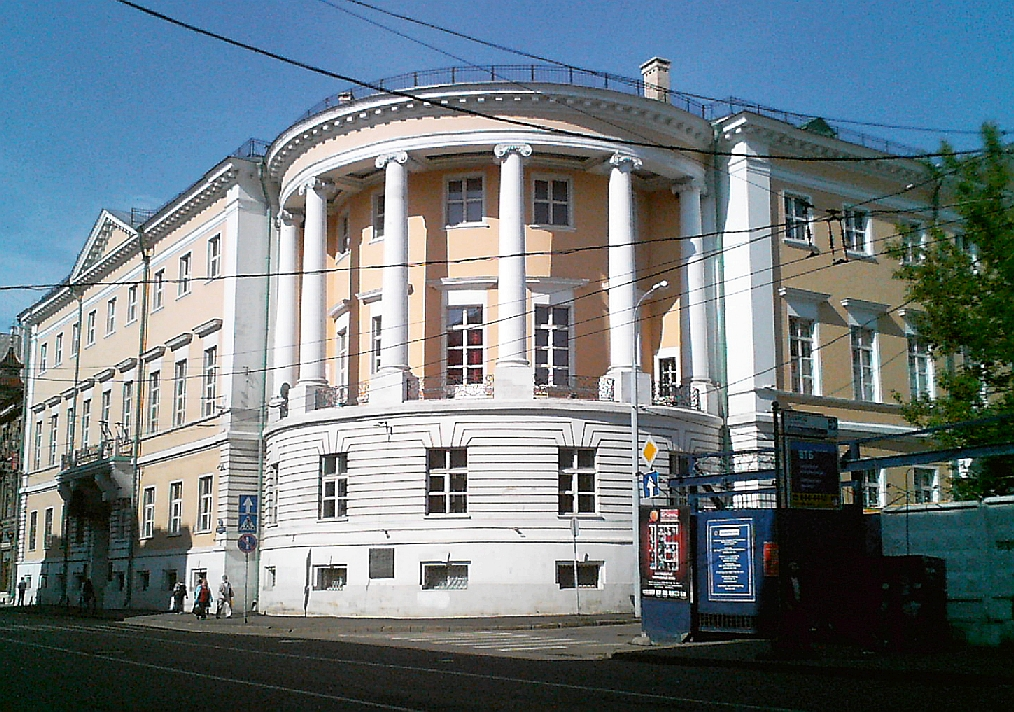
The school's building at 11, Rozhdestvenka Street (present-day Moscow Architectural Institute) in 2009.

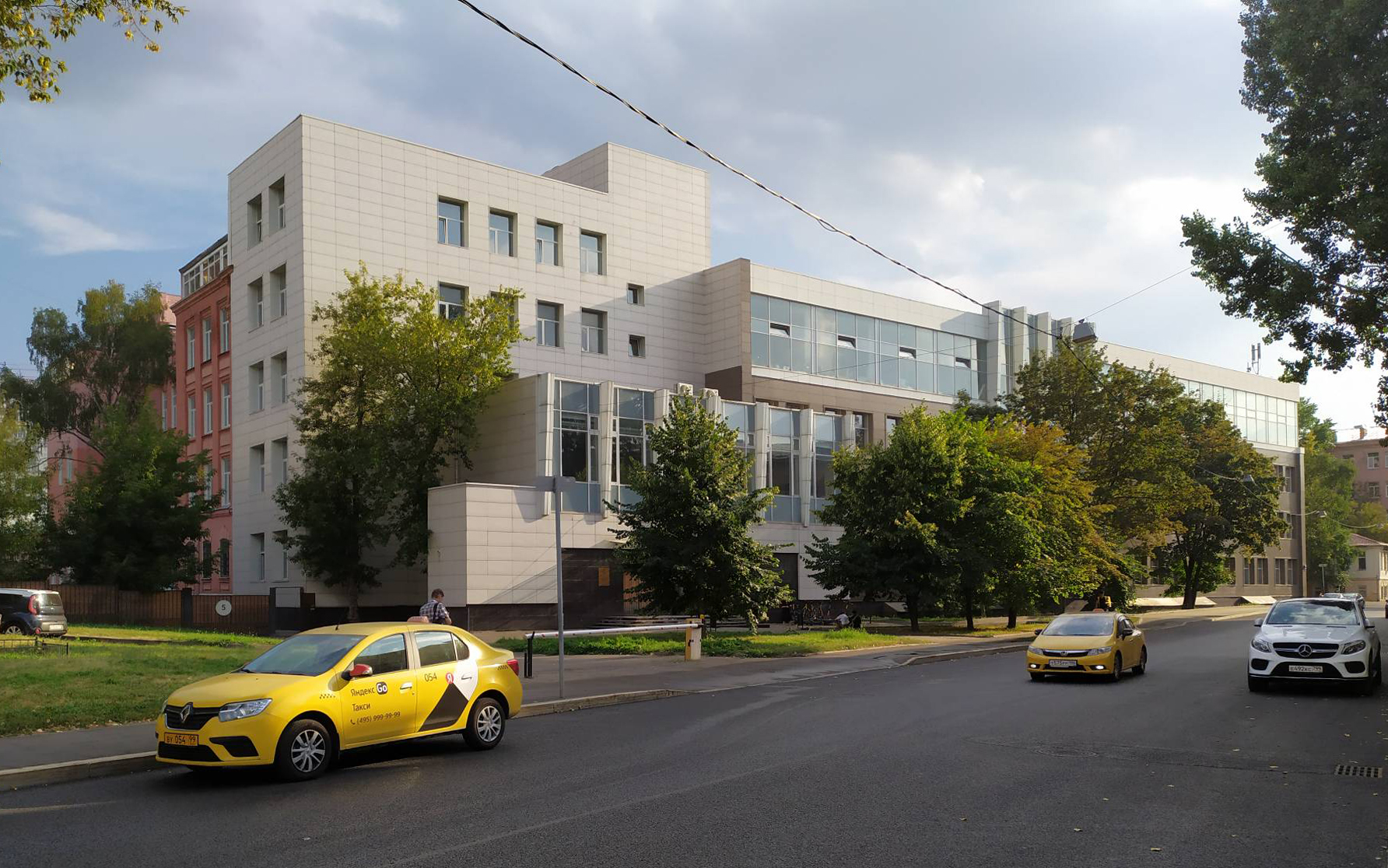
The building of the Moscow State Academic Art Institute named after V.N. Surikov (founded in 1948) at 30 Tovarishcheskiy Lane, Moscow.

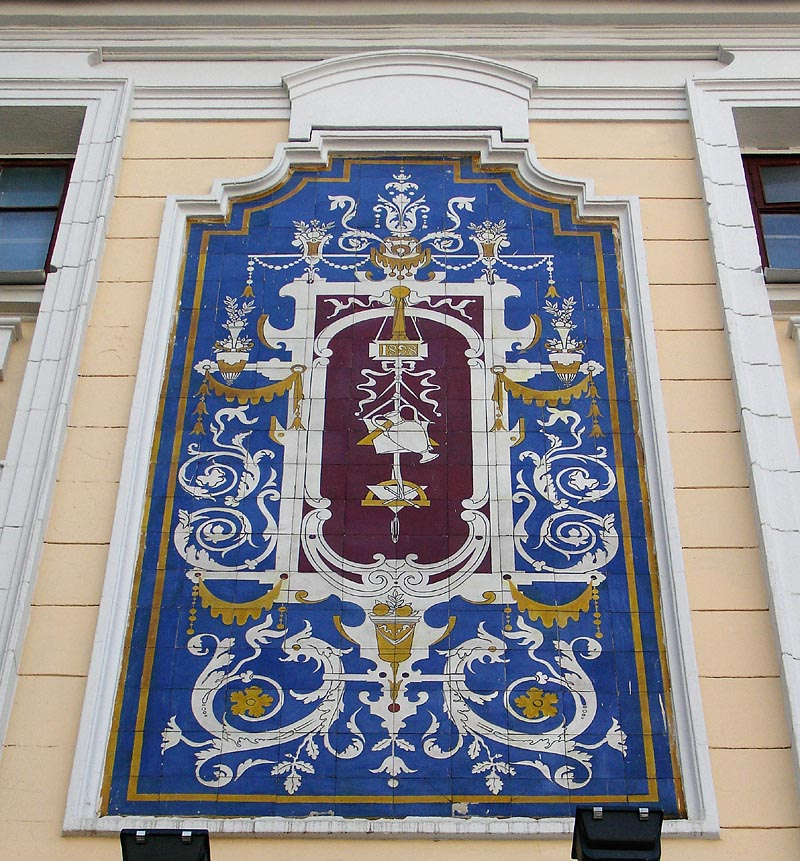
Tiled artwork on the historical School building, Rozhdestvenka Street.

The Moscow School of Painting, Sculpture and Architecture (Russian: Московское училище живописи, ваяния и зодчества, МУЖВЗ), also known by the acronym MUZHVZ, was one of the largest educational institutions in Russia. The school was formed by the 1865 merger of a private art college, established in Moscow in 1832, and the Palace School of Architecture, established in 1749 by Dmitry Ukhtomsky. By the end of the 19th-century, it vied with the state-run St. Petersburg Academy of Arts for the title of the largest art school in the country. In the 20th century, art and architecture separated again, into the Surikov Art Institute in Moscow (Russian: Московский Художественный Институт имени Сурикова) and the Moscow Architectural Institute (Russian: Московский Архитектурный Институт); The latter occupies the historical School buildings in Rozhdestvenka Street.

== History ==
The Palace School of Architecture goes back to the classes of Dmitry Ukhtomsky that operated in 1749–1764. Twenty years, the classes were reinstated by Matvey Kazakov, and in 1804 acquired the title of Kremlin College, later Palace School of Architecture. Graduates were awarded the title of Architect's Assistant and had to earn their own licenses through later work.

The private art college was established in 1832 by Egor Makovsky and A.S. Yastrebilov as Classes of Nature, and renamed Art Classes in 1833. In 1843, the classes were incorporated as the School of Painting and Sculpture of the Moscow Art Society.

In 1865, the Palace School was incorporated into School of Painting and Sculpture; next year, the expanded institution was renamed Moscow School of Painting, Sculpture and Architecture. The School was unique in Imperial Russia, being a private college in a country where education was primarily state-managed. Its diplomas (excluding the few highest-ranking graduates) were ranked inferior to those of the Academy of Arts; probably unimportant in fine arts, this division was a serious burden for graduates in architecture. The School tried to close the gap through acquiring a state charter in 1896, but failed.

After the October Revolution of 1917, the school was transformed in 1918 into the Second Free State Art Workshop (Svomas). Art workshops eventually disintegrated. In 1939, Igor Grabar launched the new college of fine arts, which acquired the name of Surikov Institute in 1948. Architectural education initially concentrated around VKhUTEMAS and MVTU and was organized into the Moscow Architectural Institute in 1933.

== Fine arts school ==
More democratic in comparison with the St. Petersburg Academy of Arts, the school played an important role in developing Russian national realistic art in the second half of the 19th century and the beginning of the 20th century.

Admissions were based primarily on artistic merits, allowing students without formal high school diplomas. For example, Konstantin Melnikov joined the school at the age of 15, having only two years of primary education; his class of 11 was chosen from 270 applicants. Melnikov completed a diploma in arts after nine years of training (1905–1914) and a diploma in architecture three years later.

== Architecture school ==
A study of 100 architects working in Moscow between the 1890s and 1910s by Maria Naschokina shows that more than half of them graduated from the school. The fact that most school graduates lacked a full state diploma was a major drawback in state employment, but irrelevant for the private clients that dominated construction market in Moscow. Thus, architectural profession in Moscow and Saint Petersburg were clearly divided between graduates of the Moscow School and the Saint Petersburg schools (Imperial Academy of Arts and Institute of Civil Engineers).

The students had to demonstrate professional achievement during their education and were rated according to their graduate assignment. The best, earning a Large Silver medal, were rewarded with an official title of an Architect, sufficient for private order and state employment. The next tier, with a Small Silver medal, received a construction management license, sufficient for taking private orders but not state jobs. The rest did not qualify and had to return with new graduate projects. As an alternative, they could apply to the Imperial Academy and complete the courses at Saint Petersburg; the Academy awarded construction management licenses to all graduates. There were few moves in the opposite direction (Ivan Fomin was expelled from the Academy and completed his license exams in Moscow). Some, like Vyacheslav Oltarzhevsky or Ilya Bondarenko, completed training overseas. Fyodor Schechtel was expelled from the School in 1878 and acquired the license only in 1894.

These difficulties extended architectural training, from admission to professional license, to 10–15 years and even more; graduates were typically mature men in their thirties, with a decade of practical experience. There were, however, rare exceptions like Ivan Mashkov, who earned a license at the age of 19 and completed his first projects at the age of 23.

== Notable people ==
In the late 1880s, prominent members of the realist artists group Peredvizhniki (English:The Wanderers), taught at the school including Vasily Polenov, Vladimir Makovsky and Illarion Pryanishnikov. One of the leader instructors of sculpture was Sergei Volnukhin.

The Knave of Diamonds (Russian arts association) (or Jack of Diamonds) art group was founded by group of young artists that was recently expelled from the Moscow School of Painting, Sculpture and Architecture due to their "leftist tendencies", among other founders.

Notable alumni of the school include Alexander Grigoriev, Léopold Survage, Igor Babailov, Vasily Perov, Alexei Savrasov, Illarion Pryanishnikov, Vladimir Makovsky, Isaac Levitan, Alexei Stepanov, Sergei and Konstantin Korovin, Abram Arkhipov, Mikhail Nesterov, Anna Golubkina, Sergey Konenkov, Boris Korolev, Feodor Rojankovsky, Aleksey Korin, Lazar Gadayev and Alexandru Plămădeală. Other notable alumni include: Ivan Bogdanov, Ilya and Panteleimon Golosov, Roman Klein, Nikolai Ladovsky, Nikolay Markarov, Alexander Pomerantsev, Maral Rahmanzadeh, Vagif Rakhmanov, Vardges Sureniants, Teresa Feoderovna Ries, Nikolay Krasnov, Nikolai Nevrev and Vladimir Sherwood Jr..
