= Ivan Bogdanov (painter) =

Russian painter (1855–1932)

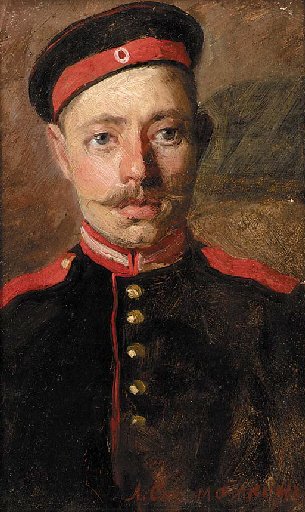
- Portrait of Ivan Bogdanov by Leonid Solomatkin
- Born: 17 August 1855; Moscow, Russian Empire
- Died: 25 December 1932 (aged 77); Moscow, Soviet Union

Ivan Petrovich Bogdanov (Russian: Иван Петрович Богданов; 17 August 1855 – 25 December 1932) was a Russian and Soviet painter.

== Biography ==
Ivan Petrovich Bogdanov was born in Moscow in 1855. His father was a tailor.

From 1878 to 1889 he studied at the Moscow School of Painting, Sculpture and Architecture.

Bogdanov died in Moscow in 1932.

== Gallery ==
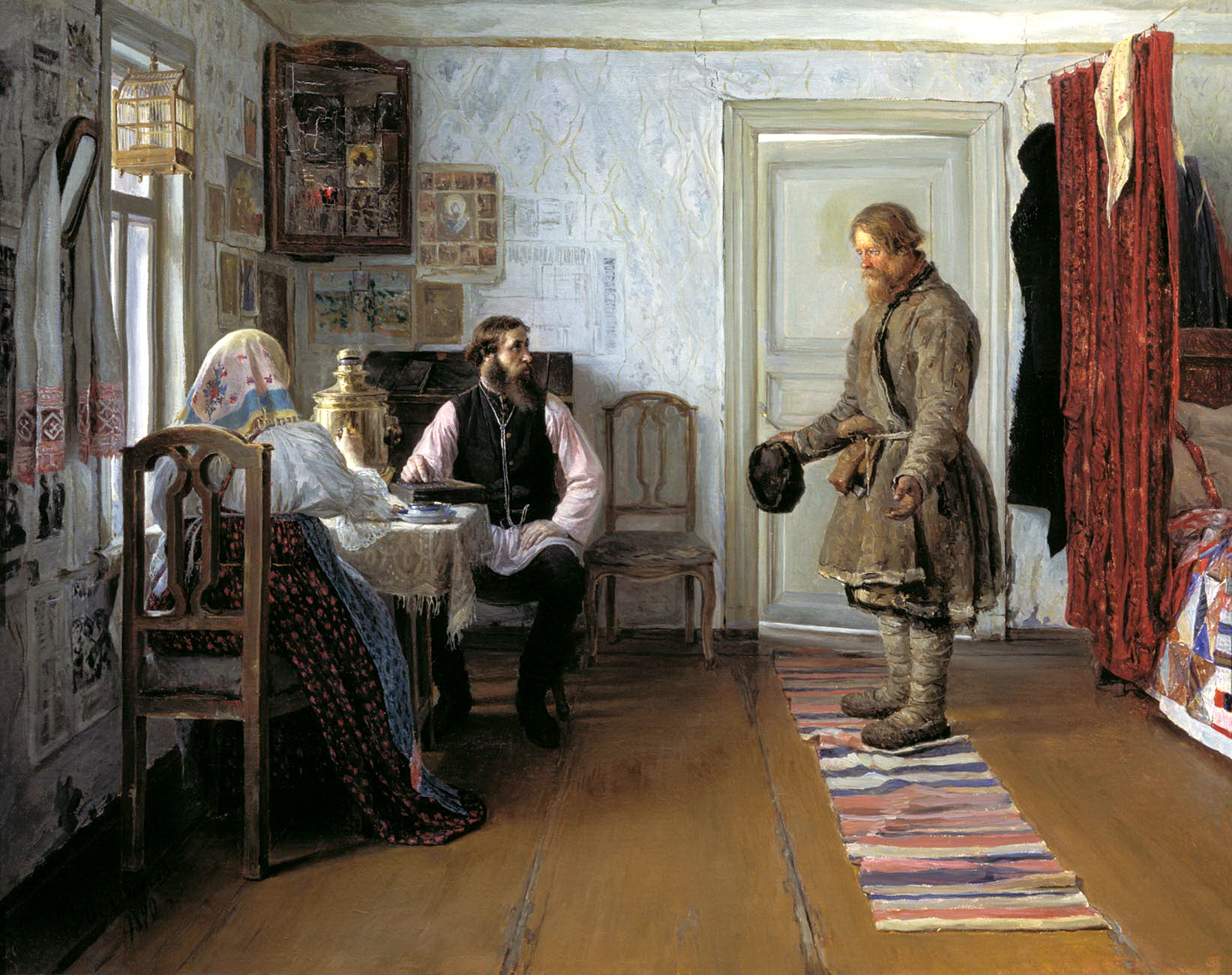
For the payoff (1890)

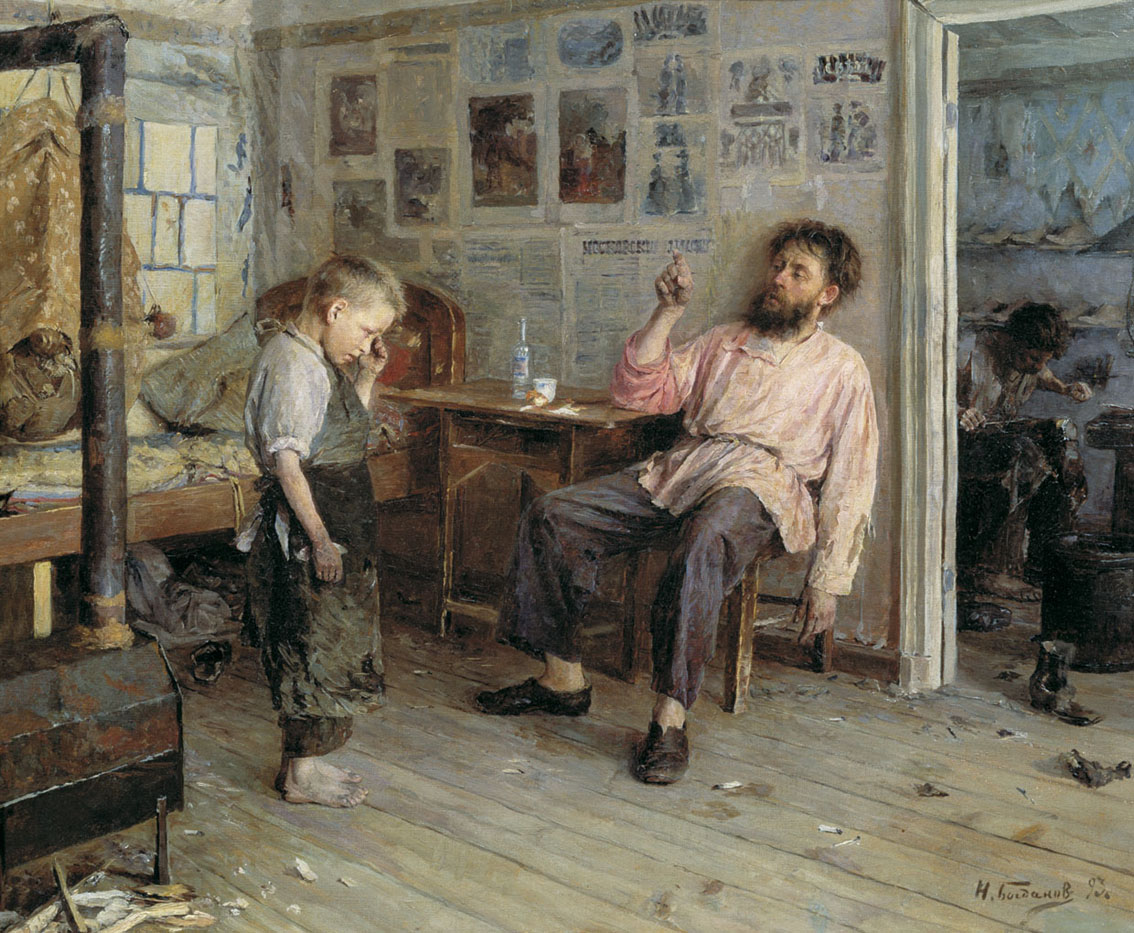
Beginner (1893)
