= Nikolay Markarov =

Russian artist (1933–2008)

- Никола́й Марка́ров
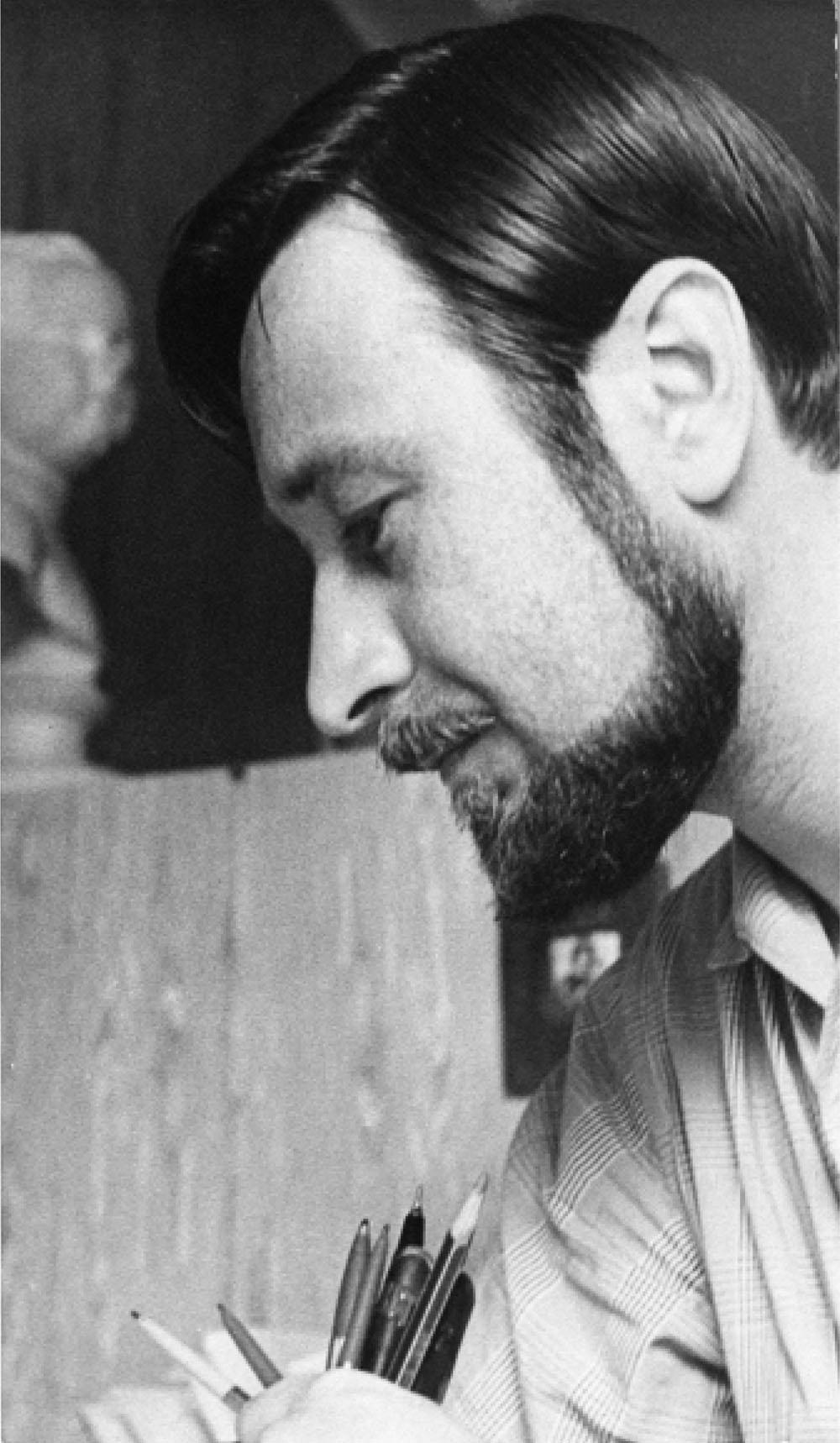
- Born: 18 March 1933; Baku, Azerbaijan SSR
- Died: 28 June 2008 (aged 75); Moscow, Russia
- Occupations: Artist; Sculptor

Nikolai Nikolayevich Markarov (Russian: Никола́й Никола́евич Марка́ров) (18 March 1933 – 28 June 2008) was a Soviet Russian artist and sculptor. He was a member of the USSR Union of Artists from 1975.

== Biography and professional activity ==
In 1956 Nikolai Markarov graduated from the Baku Art School. Then he enrolled and graduated from the Moscow State Academic Art Institute named after V.I. Surikov, being qualified as a sculptor - artist and continued to live and work in Moscow.

From 1963 to 1965 Nikolai worked as a sculptor in a sculptural production factory of RSFSR. In 1965 Nikolai Markarov was invited to Moscow Architectural Institute (State Academy) – MarchI first as a teacher at the Department of the figure, and then as a sculptor, where he was working for over 13 years.

In 1975 N. Markarov was admitted to the USSR Union of Artists on the recommendation of members of the Union of artists - sculptors A. Stemkovsky, D. Shakhovsky and N. Lavinsky, who believed that N. Markarov entered the list of the thirty best sculptors of the USSR.

Besides the main work of the sculptor -artist N. Markarov illustrated books, wrote poetry and prose.

== Group exhibitions ==
- 1946 - The children's exhibition of sculpture, I prize for sculpture "The last hours of Taras Bulba’s life on the fire", Baku
- 1961 – All-Union Art Exhibition, Moscow
- 1962 - Graphics of Transcaucasia, Moscow
- 1967 - All-Union Exhibition of small form sculptures, Moscow
- 1967 - All-Union Exhibition of young graphic artists, Moscow
- 1974 - All-Union Exhibition of sculptors, Moscow
- 1980 - The Moscow exhibition of sculptors, Moscow
- 1985 - All-Union Exhibition of sculptors, Moscow
- 1990 - Exhibition of Moscow sculptors, Moscow
- 1995 - Exhibition of Moscow sculptors in the open air, Moscow
- 1997 - Exhibition of Moscow sculptors, House of Artists, Moscow
- 2000 - Exhibition "Gifts of Moscow Artists ", Moscow
- 2004 - Regional Art Gallery, Vologda
- 2009 - Exhibition "Black on white ", Art Museum, Yaroslavl
- 2013 - Nadja Brykina's Gallery, Zurich
- 2013 - Exhibition "The Triumph of Venus. Nude in Art ", Art Museum, Yaroslavl

There were also exhibitions in Moscow in libraries named after Nekrasov, Bogolyubov, the Club of railwaymen, publishing house of the magazine "Working Woman", etc.

== Personal exhibitions ==
- 2009 - The Institute of Heritage named after Likhachev, Moscow
- 2010 - The gallery of Higher Artistic and Technical Workshops, Moscow Institute of Architecture, Moscow
- 2011 - Picture gallery, Podolsk
- 2012 - Nadja Brykina's Gallery, Moscow
- 2013 - Art Gallery “Dresden”, Gostinny Dvor, Moscow
- 2013 Art Gallery “Dresden”, International multifunctional Center of Arts, Moscow

Podolsk TV presented the exhibition of Nikolai Markarov's works on June 15, 2011

== Collection of his works in museums ==
- The State Russian Museum, the graphics department, St. Petersburg
- State History Museum, St. Petersburg
- Art Museum, Yaroslavl
- Regional Art Gallery, Vologda
- Art Gallery, Podolsk
- Museum of the Moscow Architectural Institute, Moscow
- Museum of the Patriotic War on Poklonnaya Hill, Moscow
- Nadja Brykina's Gallery, Zurich (Switzerland)
- Art Gallery “Dresden”, Moscow

== Literary activity ==
- "Anthology of Russian free verse". M., Publisher Prometheus, 1991. 348 pp., ISBN 5-7042-0589-5
- "Origins", almanac. M., Publisher RIF «ROY ", 2006. 321 pp., ISBN 5-89956-185-8
- N. Markarov. Selected works in 6 volumes. M., Publisher magazine Youth, 2010, ISBN 5-7282-0237-3

== Book graphics ==
- Prokofiev S.L., Sapgir G.V., Grishin V.G. Ruddy cheeks, M., Physical Education and Sport, 1987, ISBN 5-278-00108-9
- Kharazyan E.G. TAY - CI ancient Chinese Gymnastics, Tver Regional Council VDFSO union, order number 498
- Kharazyan E.G. Tips of the three doctors, M., RIF " ROY ", 2005, ISBN 5-89956-180-7
- Rezina U., Stories, M., 2006, ISBN 5-88531-038-6

== Publications about Markarov ==
- Roy G.S., Almanac "Origins" 2006
- Academician (sculptor) Burganov A.N., Kazantsev A., "Bogolyubov magazine” No.7, July 2008
- G. Avetisyan, magazine "Armenian Church " Russian Diocese of the Armenian Apostolic Church (Moscow) No.4, April 2008
- Pushchin V., the newspaper " The Coach series "
- Gabrieljan N. "Nine lines of Nikolai Markarov" newspaper " Interlocutor of Armenia" No.10, October 2013

== Catalogues ==
- Nikolai Markarov. Overheard song. Nadja Brykina's Gallery, 2012. ISBN 978-3-9523522-3-6
- Black & White Russian and European Graphics of the 20th Century. Yaroslavl Art Museum. Gallery 2.36, 2009. ISBN 978-5-89449-017-5
- Nikolai Markarov, sculptures, drawings, poems. Teachers of MARCHI, Moscow Architectural Institute. Gallery of Higher Artistic and Technical Workshops, 2010

== Souvenirs of Yaroslavl Art Museum ==
- N. Markarov. Nine lines, 1963, souvenir plate, porcelain, diameter 12 cm, IC Zhukov "YarDecal", 2009
- N. Markarov. In Banja (bath), 1960, souvenir plate, porcelain, diameter 12 cm, IC Zhukov "YarDecal", 2009
- N. Markarov. Nine lines, 1963, souvenir plate, porcelain, diameter 12 cm, IC Zhukov "YarDecal", 2013
- N. Markarov. In Banja (bath), 1960, souvenir plate, porcelain, diameter 12 cm, IC Zhukov "YarDecal", 2013

== Poetry ==
 ***

The watch is implacable: It will work even when taken off the wrist and set aside.

(V.4, p. 228)

 ***

— Immortality? We′ve sliced it into centuries and seconds!

(V.4, p. 228)

 ***

Oh Lord, pardon me, could it be true that I do see now what You mean?

(V.4, p. 219)

 ***

I inherit all that has been invented by mankind: the Paper, the Three Nails, and the Atomic Mushroom.

(V.4, p. 215)

ABOUT A MIRROR

The sky was the colour of soil,

His hair was colour of soil,

Hands and bare feet were colour of soil,

There went a dirty man

On a dirty land.

And there was in his bosom

A small round mirror without a rim.

And now and then

When it was light for him like a day

He took his glass,

Mapped sweat and dust off

And cleaned until

It became bright,

As bright as the sky.

And the sky was clean in it

Like a glass.

And not looking into it

He put it again in his bosom

And went on going.

ABOUT AN ARM-CHAIR

I ordered an arm-chair.

But in good time

It wasn't ready.

And when it was ready

The lacquer didn't stick.

When it stopped sticking,

Lost its luster.

And I went to the wood,

Where a stump waited.

All I needed was

To flick the bug off

To seat myself on the stump.
