= Lazar Gadayev =

Russian sculptor

Lazar Tezeevich Gadayev (Russian: Лазарь Тезеевич Гадаев; 1938 – 21 September 2008), also known as Lazar Gadaev, was the most prominent sculptor of modern Ossetia and one of the outstanding artists of multinational Russia. His art was rooted in the traditions of national plastic art of his native Ossetia, in mythology and poetry of ancient Alanian culture.

Gadaev was born in Digora. A graduate of the Arts and Graphic Design Faculty of North-Ossetia Teachers Training College and the Faculty of Sculpture of Moscow Surikov Arts Institute, Lazar Gadayev was admitted to the Union of Artists of the USSR in 1966, right after the graduation, and started exhibiting his works on a large scale.

After the first exhibits with his participation in the 1970s Lazar Gadayev became famous as the master of “small plastic art”. Later he performed monumental projects also, among them monuments to Alexander Pushkin (1999) in Neopalimovsky Lane, Moscow, and Osip Mandelstam (2008) in Voronezh.

Lazar Gadayev died on 21 September 2008, on his 70th year and was laid to rest at Troyekurovskoye Cemetery in Moscow. A large collection of Lazar Gadayev's works has been collected in the Tretyakov Gallery. His works are also kept in Museum of Oriental Arts (Moscow), Moscow Museum of Modern Art, Russian Museum (St. Petersburg) and P. Ludwig Museum (Germany), in museums of cities of Russia and CIS countries. The sculptor's works can also be found in many private collections of Russia and other countries.
