= Maral Rahmanzadeh =

Azerbaijani painter (1916–2008)

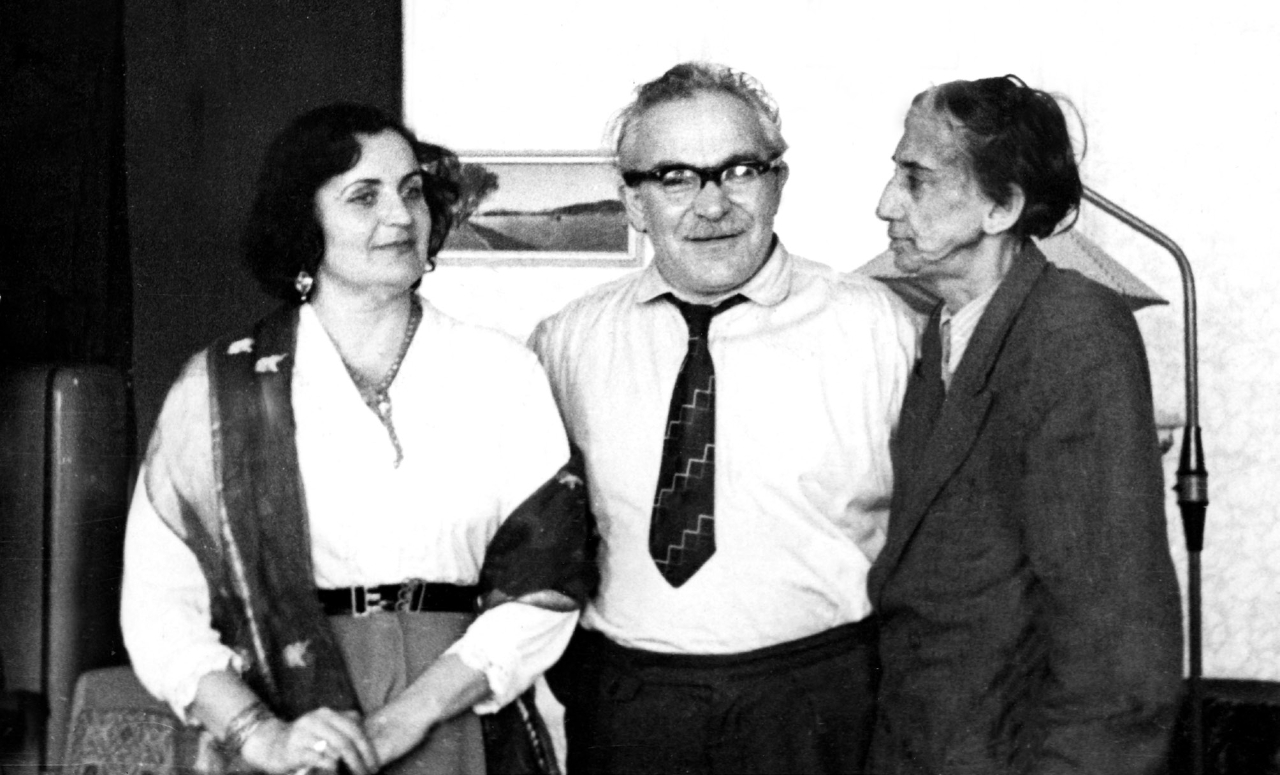
- Born: Maral Yusif gizi Rahmanzade; July 23, 1916; Mardakan, Baku Gradonachalstvo, Russian Empire
- Died: March 18, 2008 (aged 91); Baku, Azerbaijan
- Occupations: Painter, graphic designer

Maral Yusif gizi Rahmanzadeh (Azerbaijani: Maral Yusif qızı Rəhmanzadə; 23 July 1916 – 18 March 2008) was a Soviet and Azerbaijani graphic artist and painter. She was awarded the honorary title of People's Artist of the Azerbaijan SSR (1964), and the State Prize.

== Biography ==
Maral Rahmanzadeh was born in Mardakan, Russian Empire (now Azerbaijan). From 1930 to 1933, she studied at the Azerbaijan State Technical School of Arts, and from 1934 to 1940, she continued her education at the Moscow State Institute of Arts. In 1940, after graduating from the institute, the master of graphic arts started working at the "Khudozhestvennaya Literatura" publishing house in Moscow. In 1941, the artist's father was subjected to repression and declared an enemy of the people. Six months later, he died in a Tashkent prison. M. Rahmanzadeh had to leave her job in Moscow and return to Baku, where she continued her artistic career. From that very year, a series of works signed "Maral Rahmanzadeh" began.

Rahmanzadeh is the eldest sister of sculptor and honoree of the Academy of Arts of the Republic of Kazakhstan, Vagif Rakhmanov. She is the aunt of acclaimed Canadian singer-songwriter and visual artist Deniz Reno (aka Deniz Rakhmanova), Kazakh-German painter Nargis Rakhmanova-Dressler and Kazakh artisan Aigul Rakhmanova.

== Artistic work ==
Rahmanzadeh's most productive field was graphic arts, particularly lithography and coloured linoprints. During the Great Patriotic War, Rahmanzadeh produced a series of paintings featuring patriotic content. One of these series was dedicated to Soviet women during the wartime, including such works as "People's Volunteer Corps", "Women in the Ranks", "Partisan's Daughter" and "Radio Operator". Another series of 19 prints focused on the workers on the home front, including “Work on the Farm”, “Social Activists” and “The Artists Performing for the Front-Line Soldiers”. The piece “Wives Substitute Husbands” depicted women working at machines in factories. These paintings were made using black watercolour with coal accents.

In the 1940s, Rahmanzadeh turned to illustrating literature. In 1945, she illustrated “Dehname” by Khatai and "The Land of Fires" by Zohrabbeyov. Her work on "Dehname" was particularly successful, where she portrayed poetic images of women. Rahmanzadeh also illustrated two depictions of the poet and book author Khatai - one a portrait in profile, the other showing the poet, pen in hand, writing at night. For “The Land of Fires”, Rahmanzadeh created numerous illustrations depicting landscapes, architecture and costumes. The opening illustration showed riders on the left side of a print, followed by a panoramic view of a bay and a mysterious tower, which the landlady promised would soon be revealed.

During these years, Rahmanzadeh created illustrations for Jafar Jabbarly's "Maiden Tower" and "Gulzar". In the post-war period, she worked intensively on paintings and autolithography. In 1947, she exhibited "Petroleum", a series of 10 autolithographs depicting the history of the oil industry. The series began with "Fire Worshippers", a composition representing the worship of eternal fire, and included works such as "A New Enterprise", "On the Oil Rig", "Jack-Pump" and "Fountain Hammered to a Pipe".

In 1948, Maral Rahmanzadeh completed another series, "Socialistic Baku", consisting of 10 paintings portraying industrial and urban landscapes. Compositions included "Shift of a Vigil", "Day of a Vigil", and "In Construction of a New House". Her journeys to Neft Daşları (Oil Rocks) proved especially productive for the artist.

Rahmanzadeh was the first artist to work directly at the Oil Rocks. Living among oilmen and observing their daily lives, she painted field landscapes of the Caspian Sea, scaffold bridge constructions, oil tanks and towers, and scenes of oil production. Her drawings and watercolour paintings captured authentic episodes from the working life of oilmen on the Caspian Sea. The paintings were exhibited in Baku and even shown to workers at Neft Daşları, to whom the series was dedicated.

She later created the autolithograph series "Here in the Caspian Sea", published as an album of 15 colour lithographs in Moscow. Works like "In the Open Sea" portrayed towering rigs, steel bridges and the mirror-like sea surface. Other lithographs, such as "On-Duty Boat", "The Food is Brought" and "To a Storm Zone", depicted the harsh yet heroic life of oil workers. This series of lithographs brought broad acclaim to Rahmanzadeh and was exhibited throughout the USSR and internationally.

In 1950, Rahmanzadeh illustrated a two-volume poetry collection by Jafar Jabbarly, producing prints portraying characters from his plays "Sevil", "Almaz", and "Withered Flowers". The same year, she contributed to Mirza Fatali Akhundov's historical play "Aldanmish Kevakib" ("Deceived Stars") and later illustrated translations of "Eugene Onegin" by Alexander Pushkin and "A Hero of Our Time" by Mikhail Lermontov.

By the late 1950s, she had created a series of colour autolithographs called "Baku", featuring urban parks, squares and marine oil field panoramas. The series was displayed at the 1959 Moscow exhibition dedicated to a decade of Azerbaijani literature and art. Around this time, Rahmanzadeh also produced autolithographs inspired by Czechoslovakia, including landscapes such as "A Winter Day in Karlovy Vary", "A Street in Cheb", "Central Square of Cheb" and "Richmond Sanatorium". These works were exhibited at "The World Through the Eyes of Azerbaijani Artists" (1961), and later in a group exhibition dedicated to Czechoslovakia in Moscow.

In later years, Rahmanzadeh explored the linocut technique. Her linocuts were dedicated to the large factories of two young cities, Sumgait and Rustavi, each consisting of six industrial and urban landscapes and two portraits portraying front-line workers.

During the 1960s, she travelled to a number of remote regions in Azerbaijan, producing colour linocut series such as “My Motherland” and “Azerbaijan”. Many pieces focused on Nakhchivan, showing ploughed fields with furrow lines leading to a river and nearby villages. Other works portrayed Khinalug, a remote mountain village in northern Azerbaijan, where she studied local life and painted residents in national costume, traditional homes and mountain scenery.

In 1956, Rahmanzadeh illustrated Mammed Said Ordubadi's historical novel "A Sword and Pen", and in 1963, she illustrated academic publications for "Azerbaijani Fairytales".

In November 2016, the National Museum of Art of Azerbaijan held a retrospective exhibition showcasing Rahmanzadeh's paintings, lithographs, lino-prints, drawings and book illustrations .

== Awards ==
- Honorary title of "People's Artiste of the Azerbaijan SSR" – June 29, 1964
- Honorary title of "Honored Art Worker of the Azerbaijan SSR" – May 24, 1960
- Azerbaijan SSR State Prize named after Mirza Fatali Akhundov – April 28, 1965 (for the linocut series "Azerbaijan" and "My Motherland")
- Shohrat Order – July 22, 1996
- "Order of the Red Banner of Labour"
- "Badge of Honour" Order – June 9, 1959
- Personal Pension of the President of the Republic of Azerbaijan – June 11, 2002

== See also ==
- List of Azerbaijani women artists
