= Aleksey Korin =

Russian painter (1865–1923)

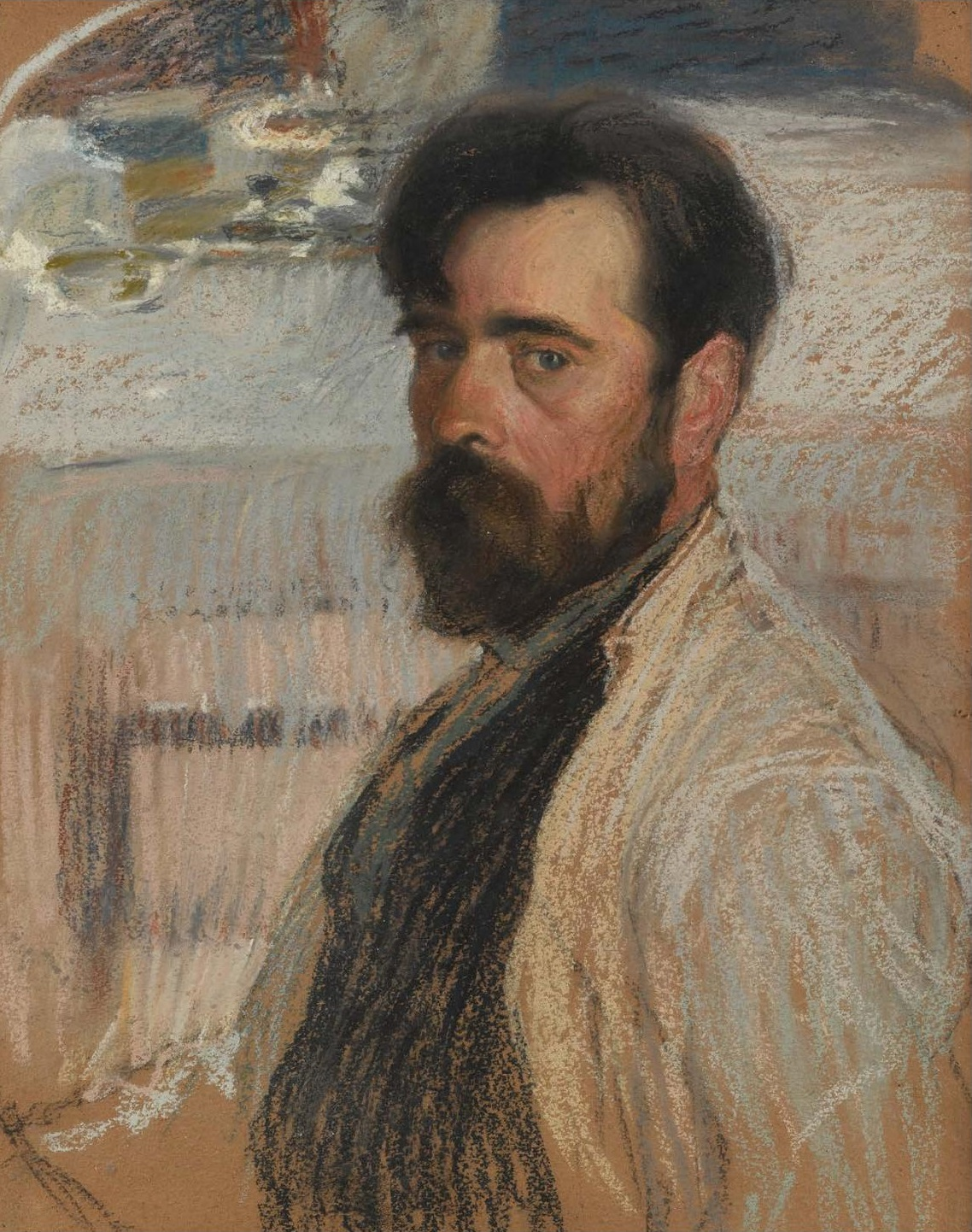
Self-portrait (1915)

Aleksey Mikhailovich Korin (Russian: Алексей Михайлович Корин; 16 March 1865, Palekh – 13 February 1923, Marino, Tver Governorate) was a Russian genre painter. He was a member of the Peredvizhniki and a professor at the Moscow School of Painting, Sculpture and Architecture.

== Biography ==
Korin was born into a peasant family of icon painters. His father, Nikolai, was well-known locally for his miniatures. Despite this, Aleksey was not encouraged to pursue formal art studies. His first basic lessons came from his uncle, Dmitry Korin, the father of Pavel Korin. From 1875 to 1876, he was apprenticed to the icon painting workshop at the Trinity Lavra of St. Sergius.

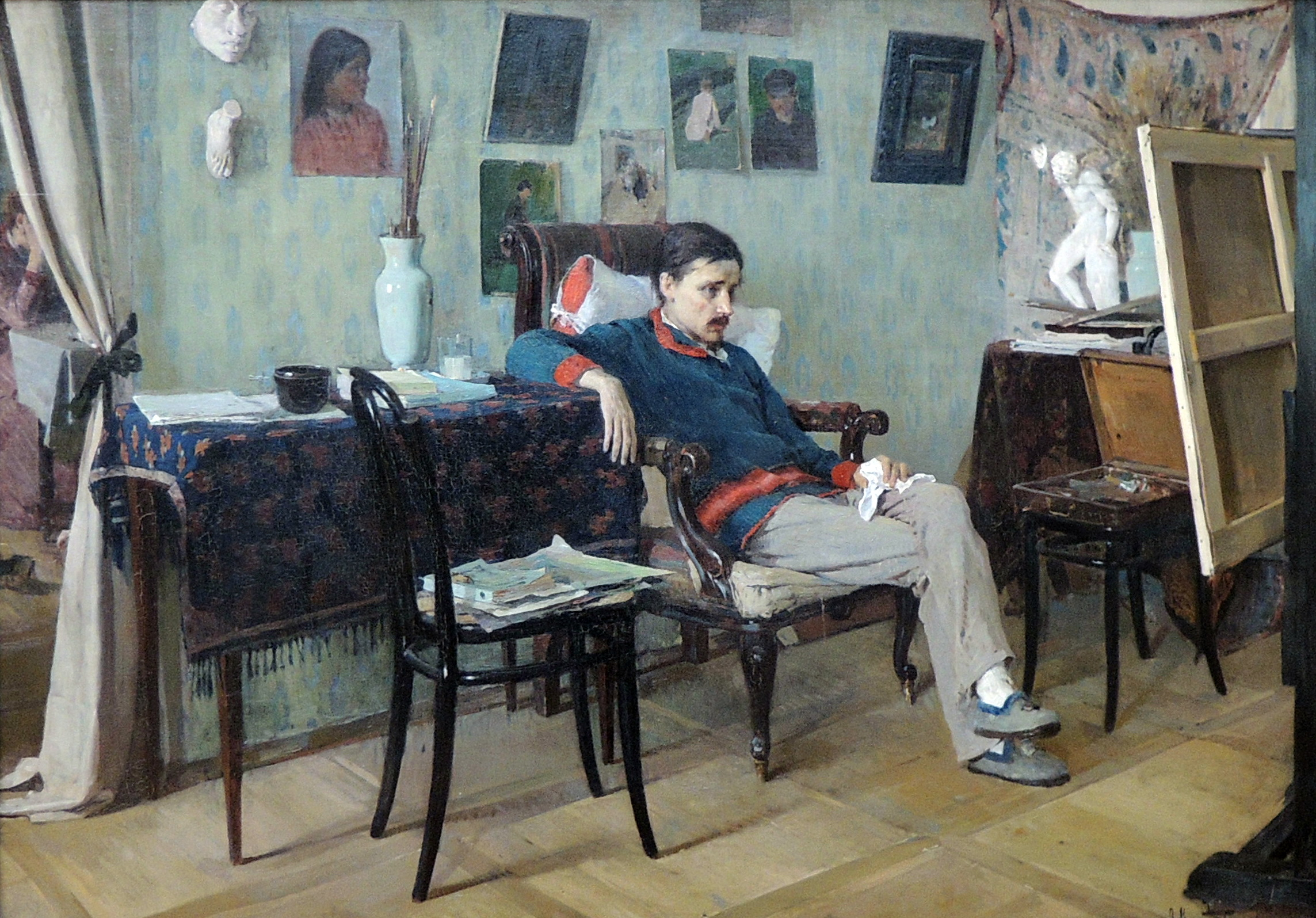
The Sick Artist

From 1876 to 1877, contrary to his father's wishes, he went to enroll at the Moscow School of Painting, Sculpture and Architecture in 1884, where he studied with Vasily Perov, Illarion Pryanishnikov, Vladimir Makovsky and Vasily Polenov. He graduated in 1889, receiving a silver medal and the title of "Artist". That same year, he joined a group of painters led by Isaac Levitan who painted en plein aire in the vicinity of Plyos.

In 1890, 1891 and 1892, he won awards from the Moscow Society of Art Lovers. His painting, "The Sick Artist" was acquired by Pavel Tretyakov and he became a member of the Peredvizhniki in 1894. From 1894 to 1917, he was a professor at his alma mater.

After 1900, he spent the summer months at a small village in Tver Governorate and began teaching at the Stroganov School for Technical Drawing. He also participated in organizing the art department at the Tobolsk Museum.

In 1901, he was awarded the Order of Saint Stanislaus, followed by the Order of St. Anna in 1909. From 1911 to 1912, he painted murals at the Alexander Nevsky Cathedral, Sofia, and helped restore the iconography at his former place of apprenticeship, the Trinity Lavra.

After the October Revolution, he left Moscow and settled in Marino, where he opened a workshop. He participated in the 2nd and 3rd National Exhibitions of Painting in 1919 (Moscow) and 1920 (Ryazan). He died at home after a long illness.

== Selected paintings ==
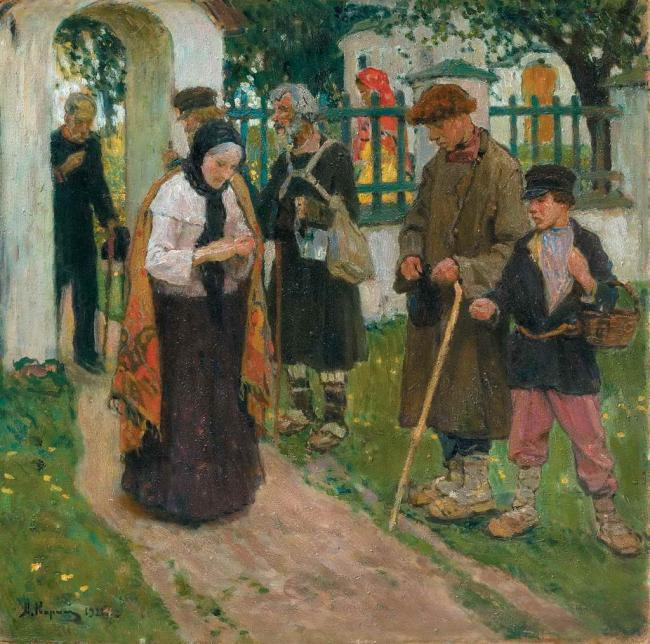
Near the Church

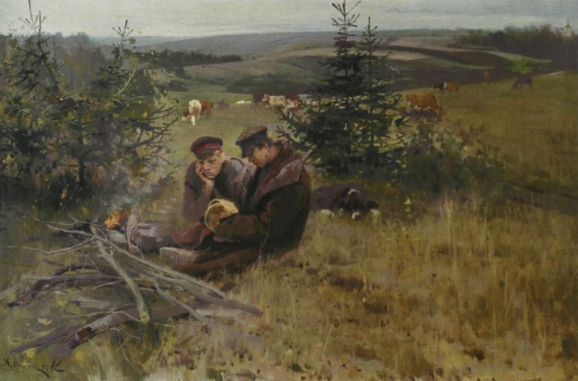
The Herdsmen

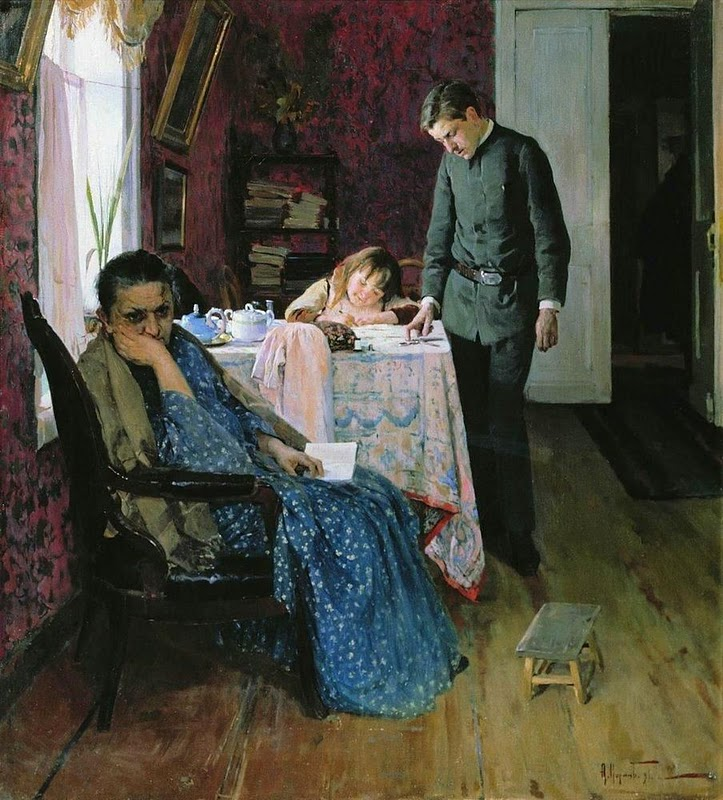
Failed Again!

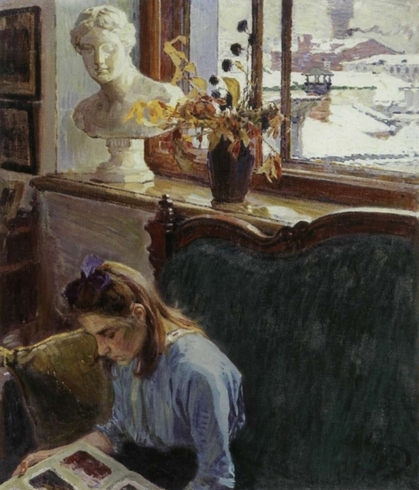
The Window
