= Moonbeam (band) =

Russian electronic music project

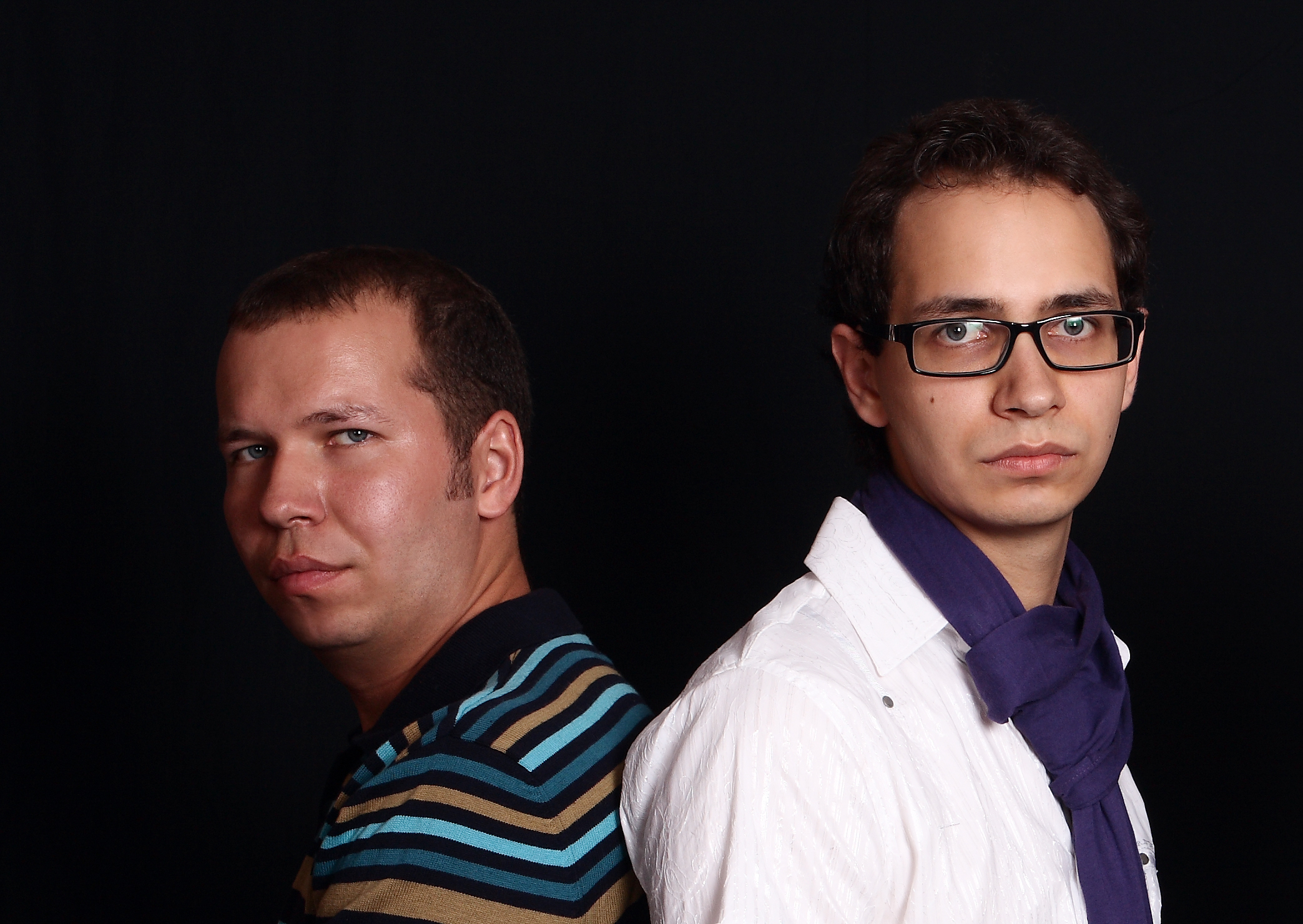
- Moonbeam in 2009

Background information
- Origin: Nizhny Novgorod, Russia
- Genres: Electronic
- Years active: 2003–2016; 2019–present
- Labels: Black Hole; Moonbeam Digital; Ultra; Armada
- Members: Vitaly Khvaleev
- Past members: Pavel Khvaleev
- Website: https://moonbeam.pro

Moonbeam is a Russian electronic music project, founded in 2003 by brothers Vitaly and Pavel Khvaleev. They describe their music style as a mixture of trance, progressive house, atmospheric techno, and deep minimal. In 2010, Moonbeam was listed in DJ Magazine's Top 100 DJs at position number 42, becoming the third Russian musician in history to make the list.

In 2016, Vitaly and Pavel announced the closure of the project. After 3 years off downtime, in 2019 Vitaly Khvaleev launched Moonbeam.

== Biography ==
Vitaly (born September 17, 1979) and Pavel (born May 27, 1984) Hvaleev were born in the city of Naberezhnye Chelny, Tatarstan, Russia. In 1996, Vitaly graduated from one of the local schools and enrolled in Nizhny Novgorod State Pedagogical University's geography department, and then continued his studies in graduate school, earning a degree in human psychophysiology. Pavel, after graduating from high school, attended Kazan State Technical University. In 1999, Vitaly moved to Nizhny Novgorod, where he began working as a DJ at Pechora, a local nightclub. Pavel moved to the same city five years later.

== Early work ==
As students, Pavel and Vitaly began to create tracks, remixes, and arrangements using all sorts of samples, and with the availability of computers pursued this more intensely. While working under the pseudonym "Black & Cap", they wrote several tracks, including a mix of the song "Flow" with Anastasia Sorokina. In 1997, the project changed its name to "Exaltation" and began work with guitarist Sergey Fedotov.

== Career ==
=== 2000s ===
In 2003, American vocalist Chris Lunsford came to Nizhny Novgorod; the brothers recorded the track "Raven Gypsy" with him, and then created 2 more works: "Consumption" and "Forgotten Grey". At this time, the brothers took a new alias, "Moonbeam". In 2004, they released their first single with Portuguese label Feed Me Records. Pavel and Vitaly then went to Zurich and gave their first official performance at the nightclub Supermarket.

At the end of 2005, Moonbeam created a platform for the release of their own works, the first Russian digital record label, Moonbeam Digital.

In 2007, Moonbeam signed contracts with some of the biggest labels in the Netherlands - High Contrast Recordings, which released the Cocoon EP, and Black Hole Recordings, which became home to two new releases, "I Love Mornings" and "See The Difference Inside".

2008 began with a remix of Perfect Strangers' "Ode Ao Sol". Later, Moonbeam published a remix of Marcus Schössow's "Chase My Rabbit" on Black Hole Recordings.

In addition, Markus Schulz includes Moonbeam's remix of Lens' "Beyond The Shadows" in his compilation Amsterdam'08, and Incentive Company and Ministry of Sound signed a contract to produce a remix in the UK and Ireland. In 2008, many of Moonbeam's original tracks and remixes found their way into various collections, such as Mr Sam's "Opus Secundo", Trance Mission, Trance Energy, Ibiza Trance House 2008, and others.

In the spring of 2008, the brothers went on an international tour, stopping in places such as Miami, Japan, and Australia. At the end of the same year, English label SOUNDZ produced the world premiere of the album "Consumption".

2009 saw the release of the single "30 Days Of Drought", which was released on the label Proton Music. This was followed by several more releases on various labels. In late spring, Moonbeam took part in a Depeche Mode remix contest. A month later, the duo opened for Tiësto in the "Tiësto Summer Tour" in Kyiv. Many tracks were released during this period, including the single "Angel / Lacula" on the label Black Hole Recordings and several remixes. The group toured in Germany, The Netherlands, India, France, Japan, Australia, Ukraine, and Russia.

At the end of 2009, the track "About You" (ft. Avis Vox) was included in the compilation A State Of Trance Yearmix 2009, mixed by Armin van Buuren.

=== 2010s ===
In late 2009, Moonbeam announced that they would release a new studio album, titled Around the World, on March 22, 2010, on the label Black Hole Recordings.

In 2011, they released a new album called The Secret (Moonbeam Digital).

In 2012, Pavel and Vitaly passed their 200th Moonbeam production milestone. In November of the same year, they released You Win Me, which featured the vocals of Aelyn. The track was the first to be taken from the album The Random, released in 2013 on Black Hale Recordings.

The Random became the studio's first feature-length film, with an original soundtrack written, composed and performed by Moonbeam. The film, whose plot revolves around a mysterious game (the 'Random' of the title), received a limited European cinematic run. It was released on DVD in North America on May 13, 2014.

In late 2014 Moonbeam returned to the studio to record their next international album. The result was Atom, which again followed in the Khvaleev brothers' grand tradition of the untraditional. The first single taken from it, Follow Me, co-produced by Indifferent Guy and sung by Eva Pavlova, was released in mid April 2015, with the album seeing release a month later.

The Random was followed in 2015 by their second motion picture III. The thriller/horror film made Official Selection at a wide range of international film festivals, including FANT & Nocturna, Spain, BIFFF, Belgium and the Imagine Film Festival in the Netherlands. On May 15, 2015, it won the Best Cinematography award at Australia’s prestigious Byron Bay International Film Festival.

In December 2015, they released the Original Motion Picture Soundtrack of III on the label Moonbeam Digital.

On March 5, 2016 at the festival «Trancemission Awakening» Pavel and Vitaly announced the closure of the project and the imminent release of «Eclipse» farewell album. New album "Eclipse" was released on April 25, 2016.

After 3 years off downtime, in 2019 Vitaly Khvaleev launched Moonbeam.

== Radio Show ==
Moonbeam produced, from January 2014 to 2016, "Ticket To The Moon", a monthly one-hour radio show showcasing their own songs as well as those of similar artists. Before that, they had a similar radio show called "Moonbeam Music". In 2019, Moonbeam started a podcast called "New Moon".

== Discography ==
=== Albums ===
- Promised Land (?? ??? 2008)
- Прикосновение (Touch) (?? ??? 2008)
- Malaria (12 May 2008)
- Шторм Облаков (Storm Of Clouds) (12 Sep 2008)
- Consumption (22 Dec 2008)
- Around The World (2010)
- The Secret (2011)
- The Random (2013)
- Atom (2015)
- III (2015)
- Eclipse (2016)

=== Compilations ===
- The Remixes (2008)

=== DJ Mixes ===
- What Dreams May Come (2008)
- Moonbeam presents: Space Odyssey - Venus (2010)
- Compiled & Mixed (2013)
- Moonbeam presents: Space Odyssey - Mars (2014)

=== Singles ===
- 2005: Raven Gipsy
- 2005: Forgotten Grey
- 2005: Ocean
- 2005: Around Me
- 2006: Global Warming (feat. Zhenya Orlova)
- 2006: Malaria
- 2006: Forgotten Feeling
- 2006: Farewell (feat. Oxana)
- 2006: Love And Rain
- 2006: Rebirth
- 2007: Cocoon
- 2007: Eclipse
- 2007: I Love Mornings
- 2007: See the Difference Inside
- 2007: Pick Me Up
- 2007: Consumption (feat. Chris Lunsford)
- 2008: Love Never Dies (with Tyler Michaud feat. Fisher)
- 2008: Your Wind Is In My Hands (feat. Blackfeel Wite)
- 2008: Storm of Clouds (feat. Avis Vox)
- 2008: 7 Seconds (feat. Avis Vox)
- 2009: About You (feat. Avis Vox)
- 2009: Promised Land
- 2010: Distance
- 2010: Tiger
- 2010: Openhearted (with Tyler Michaud feat. Tiff Lacey)
- 2010: The Lilt (feat. Avis Vox)
- 2010: Beijing
- 2010: Song for a Girl (feat. Blackfeel Wite)
- 2011: Dancing of the Ants (pres. Mondstrahl)
- 2011: Breathless
- 2011: Star Way (feat. Avis Vox)
- 2015: Memories (feat. Deniz Reno)

=== Remixes ===
- 2007: Minilogue - Seconds
- 2008: Marcus Schössow - Chase My Rabbit
- 2008: Rachael Starr - To Forever
- 2009: Tritonal feat. Cristina Soto - Crash Into Reason
- 2009: Matt Darey pres. Urban Astronauts feat. Kate Louise Smith - See the Sun
- 2009: Ben Preston feat. Susie - Why We Run
- 2009: Dakota - Koolhaus
- 2010: The Crystal Method feat. LMFAO - Sine Language
- 2011: BT - Love Can Kill You
- 2013: David Vendetta - Holding On

=== Videography ===
- Moonbeam - "Slow Heart"
- Moonbeam feat. Avis Vox - "7 Seconds"
- Moonbeam feat. Avis Vox - "Storm of Clouds "
- Moonbeam feat. Avis Vox - "About You"
- Moonbeam - "Lacula"
- Moonbeam - "Chirpy"
- Moonbeam - "All For A Dance"
- Moonbeam feat. Avis Vox - "We Are In Words"
- Moonbeam - "Tiger"
- Moonbeam feat. Daniel Mimra - "Look Around"
- Moonbeam - "The Underwater World"
- Avis Vox - "Introspection Attempts (Moonbeam Remix)"
- Moonbeam feat. Blackfeel Wite - "Song for a Girl"
- Moonbeam feat. Avis Vox - "Star Way"
- Moonbeam & Akshai feat. Avis Vox - "Elephant Ride"
- Moonbeam feat. Avis Vox - "Hate Is The Killer"
- Moonbeam - "Motus"
- Moonbeam & Illuminant for Fancy feat. Pryce Oliver - "No Regrets"
- Moonbeam with Eitan Carmi feat. Matvey Emerson - "Wanderer"
- Moonbeam feat. Tomomi Ukumori - "Sensitivity"
- Moonbeam feat. Leusin - "Daydream"
- Moonbeam feat. Avis Vox - "Disappearance"
- Moonbeam feat. Pryce Oliver & Avis Vox - "What Else Is There"
- Moonbeam feat. Jacob A - "Only You"
- Moonbeam feat. Aelyn - "You Win Me"
- Moonbeam - "The Raven"
- Moonbeam feat. Leusin - "Flight (Kairo Kingdom Remix Video edit)"
- Moonbeam feat. Avis Vox - "Madness"
- Moonbeam feat. ARCHNGL - "Sun Went Down"
- Moonbeam feat. Aelyn - "Hero of Hope"
- Moonbeam - "Soulstring"
- Moonbeam - "No One"
- Moonbeam feat. Avis Vox - "13th World"
- Moonbeam & Indifferent Guy feat. Eva Pavlova - "Follow Me"

== Filmography ==
- The Random (2013)
- III (2015)
