= Vagif Rakhmanov =

Azerbaijani sculptor and graphic artist

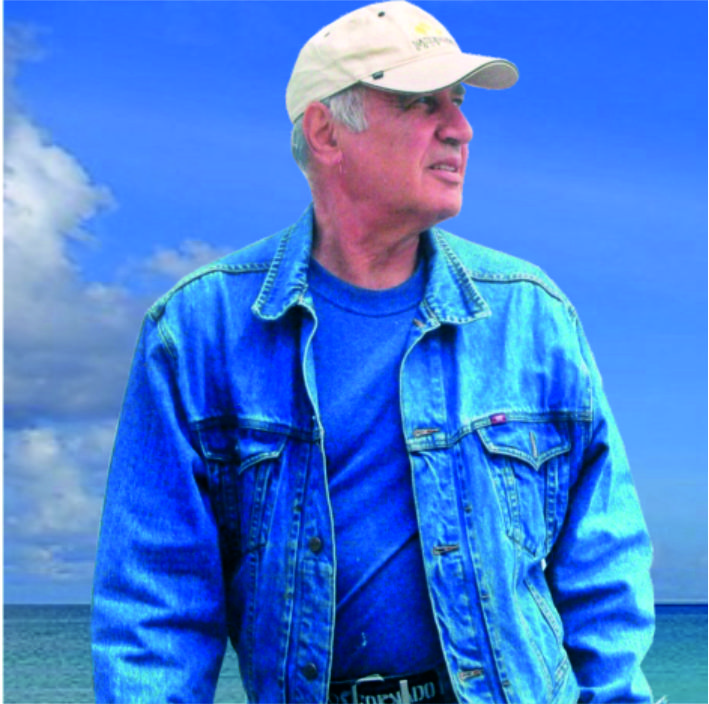
- Born: Vagif Yusuf Rahmanzade; 12 March 1940 (age 86); Mardakan, Baku, Azerbaijan
- Education: Surikov State University
- Known for: Sculptor
- Movement: Contemporary, Classical
- Awards: Since 1981 National Honored Artist of Kazakhstan Since 2007 People's Artist of Kazakhstan
- Website: http://vagif.kz

Vagif Rakhmanov (Azerbaijani: Vagif Yusuf Rəhmanzadə; 1940) is an Azerbaijani sculptor and graphic artist, Honored Artist of Kazakhstan (1981), and recipient of a Lifetime Achievement Award in Arts and Culture awarded by the Consulate of Azerbaijan to Kazakhstan. In March 2018 Rakhmanov was awarded the President's Highest Honour Medal by the President of Azerbaijan, Ilham Aliyev for his contribution in sculpture to the arts and culture of the Republic of Azerbaijan.

== Biography ==
Vagif Rakhmanov was born on March 12, 1940, in the Mardakan township near Baku to goldsmith Yusuf Oglui and Hadisha Rahmanzadeh. He was the youngest of ten siblings in a family of artists, sculptors, musicians and architects. Vagif Rakhman graduated with A Master of Fine Arts Degree from Surikov Moscow University of Fine Arts in 1970. Since 1964 he has exhibited in more than 135 International Shows in Europe, Kazakhstan and Canada, including 18 solo exhibitions in Kazakhstan, Europe, Canada and the USA. In 1981, he was awarded a title of Honored National Artist of Kazakhstan. He is nationally recognised as one of the fathers of Kazakhstan's contemporary sculpture movement.

== Personal life ==
Vagif Rakhmanov is the youngest brother of Azeri painter and People’s Artist of Azerbaijan Maral Rahmanzadeh . From 1987 to 2001, Rakhmanov was married to award-winning Russian-Canadian sculptor and film scenic artist Marina Reshetnikova. He is the father of Canadian singer-songwriter and visual artist Deniz Reno, Kazakh-German painter Nargis Rakhmanova-Dressler and Kazakh artisan Aigul Rakhmanova. Vagif is currently married to Marina Nagieva.
