= Matt Lange =

American DJ and record producer

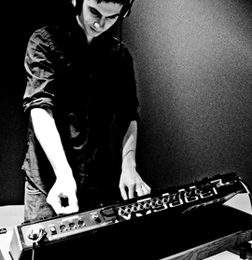

Background information
- Also known as: Altered Tensions
- Born: Manhattan, New York, U.S.
- Genres: Progressive house; deep house; techno; industrial rock
- Occupations: DJ; producer
- Years active: 2007–present
- Labels: Mau5trap; Anjunabeats; Anjunadeep; Armada Music; Isorhythm; Monstercat
- Website: mattlange.net

Matt Lange is an American DJ and producer based in Los Angeles. He is best known for co-producing "Goodbye" with DJ Glenn Morrison, His use of modular synthesis and isorhythms in his musical productions have brought him notice. Lange produced progressive house and deep house early in his career, before moving into techno production from 2015 onwards. Lange founded his own label, Isorhythm, in 2011 as a platform to release his own music. He released his debut studio album, Ephemera, in 2015 through Mau5trap, which was later followed up with Isolated in 2020.

== Early life ==
Lange was born in Manhattan, New York. As a four-year-old child, he was pushed by his parents into learning the piano, which he disliked to practice. He later joined a boys' choir at the age of six, which he stayed with for six years. After his voice changed, he left the choir and learnt how to play the guitar, which eventually led him to joining a hardcore punk metal band. Lange's later interest in Aphex Twin and Nine Inch Nails spiked his interest in recording demos and learning how to produce music. Lange initially experimented with programming basic beats on Fruity Loops and Acid Pro, later mixing them with his recorded guitar audio.

He is a graduate of the Berklee College of Music, where he studied music synthesis involving composition-based music production and sound design.

== Career ==
=== 2007–2011: IsoRhythm ===
While Lange was writing his senior thesis in Berklee at the age of 21, he was introduced to American musician BT by his professor Dr. Boulanger who was BT's mentor. This led to Lange working for BT while BT was making his album These Hopeful Machines, which was nominated for a Grammy award in 2011. Lange earned a percussion credit on the track "Rose of Jericho". Prior to that, Lange self-released an IDM and glitch album in 2007 under his alias Altered Tensions, which was influenced by artists Richard Devine and Telefon Tel Aviv.

Lange released his first official single in 2009 through Armada Music: "Anywhere With You Is Home" featuring singer Kerry Leva. This continued through 2010 where he released "East Coast / Resonate" through Silk Music and "As the Rain Falls" with Ad Brown through Songbird. After completing BT's album, Lange signed on to British label Anjunadeep through his connections with friend Andrew Bayer. He then released a number of singles through the label, including "Rift", "A Deeper Shade / Other Stories", and "Quadcore", a collaboration with other Anjunabeats regulars Boom Jinx, Bayer, and Trifonic.

In 2011, Lange founded his own label, IsoRhythm, in response to his inclinations to release his music without dealing with the schedules and bureaucracies of other labels. Through IsoRhythm, he released a few sample libraries and EPs of his own work.

=== 2012–2014: "Goodbye" and co-productions ===
Lange continued to release a number of tracks throughout 2012, such as the Here & Back Again EP and "Bowed / Class B" with Canadian DJ Glenn Morrison.

In 2013, Lange co-produced Morrison's single "Goodbye", which was nominated for Dance Recording of the Year at the 2015 Juno Awards and charted at #12 on the Billboard Canadian Top 100. He also produced Portrait of a Chameleon for American Idol runner-up Blake Lewis, and Now or Never for French trance artist Tania Zygar.

On July 14, 2014, Lange released his Stacatto EP through Anjunadeep, which comprises progressive house, deep house, and ambient tracks. The EP was described as a "silent movie score" by Dancing Astronaut. He also released "There She Goes" as a free download on December 10, 2014.

=== 2015–2016: Ephemera and Patchwork ===
In 2015, Deadmau5's label Mau5trap reached out to Lange upon hearing a techno track he had produced, and Lange responded by sending the label a number of his unreleased techno tracks. Eight months later, Deadmau5 contacted Lange through Twitter to praise his "Scorched Earth Policy" track, and within two hours gave Lange a record contract. Lange went beyond the label's original contract for an EP, and released his debut album Ephemera through Mau5trap on September 10, 2015. To celebrate the album's release, Lange threw a party with InDeep and Mau5trap at Los Angeles' Sound Nightclub.

Preceding the album's release were minimal techno lead single "My Love Aside", glitch hop and industrial track "Lying to Myself", "Ripples", and "The Fever" featuring Quivver. The techno album indicated a large shift in sound from his previous house releases, with Lange stating that Ephemera was mainly inspired by his self-built modular synthesizer system. He also said that the "minimal and groove based" sounds in "My Love Aside" helped to increase his freedom and improvisation while DJing, since it allowed Lange to play looped pieces of multiple tracks at the same time without jumbling up. A remix album for Ephemera was released on July 8, 2016, and consisted of remixes from Mat Zo, Anthony Baldino, Attlas, and Calyx & Teebee.

Lange, together with other Mau5trap artists Attlas, Rezz, and Steve Duda, were announced for a collaborative Mau5trap Bus Tour in February 2016. The tour brought them across North America, the first stop being Toronto.

On April 16, 2016, Lange released a seven-track EP titled Patchwork through Mau5trap, marking his second major release on the label. While the first five tracks of the EP were labeled as techno, the final two songs were vocally-focused and described by Lange as "the most personal tracks [he has] ever written." Lange stated that the EP was originally conceived to be of modular synthesizer based techno and expand on Ephemera's themes, but unexpected life events which he experienced caused the project's scope to increase overall. Dancing Astronaut praised the variety of melodic and "harder" tracks in the EP, which the author alluded to Lange's skill with modular synthesis and sound manipulation. Patchwork's last track, "Consider This", was later released as a single on April 29, 2016.

He released his final single of 2016 on September 16, a techno track titled "Unsettled". The song was premiered at the Smirnoff House Nocturnal Wonderland event with Mixmag.

=== 2017–present: Punish Me and Space Between ===
Lange continued to release a series of EPs in 2017: three-track Escapist on March 31, rock-inspired Punish Me on April 13 whose tracks featured vocals by Lange, and Bleed Together on December 13. Dancing Astronaut labelled Punish Me as Lange's "finest and most brooding bodies of work to date", continuing to praise the intimate and dark themes within the EPs tracks. On February 8, 2017, Lange released an industrial cover of "Fade into You" by American alternative rock band Mazzy Star. Lange mentioned that the blend of rock music, glitchy musical programming, and atmospheric elements in the song were "a look into what's coming next" in his career. His original intention to remix "Clever Girl" from Punish Me also eventually transformed into the track "All You Need to See", which he released as a single on August 7, 2017.

On April 13, 2018, Lange released his Diversions EP through IsoRhythm. This was followed by "Are You Am I" on July 13, 2018, which featured Canadian artist Deniz Reno.

On February 19, 2019, Lange released the lead single to his next EP titled "Space Between", co written with and featuring Canadian singer songwriter Deniz Reno, which combined elements of pop and progressive house. The EP of the same name was later fully released on March 13, 2019, through Mau5trap. In a press statement, Lange stated that Space Between "explores the sonic aesthetic [he has] been honing in on over the past year" while "combining outboard and modular synths with acoustic instrumentation".

Lange was featured on Deadmau5's 2019 remix album Here's The Drop, with his remix of "Superbia (ov)". He then returned to Anjunabeats after a period of five years with his release of "Every Word" on October 11, 2019. The track was later included in Lange's Isn't It Lovely EP and featured as the first track on the Anjunabeats Volume 14 album.

Lange's second studio album, Isolated, was released on October 27, 2020, through Isorhythm. Lange's third studio album, Dichotomy, was released on August 5, 2022, also through Isorhythm.

== Discography ==
Studio albums

- Ephemera (2015)
- Isolated (2020)
- Dichotomy (2022)
