= Deniz Reno =

- Born: Deniz Rakhmanova
- Origin: Almaty, Kazakhstan
- Genres: soul, pop, electropop, deep house
- Occupations: Singer-Songwriter, Composer, DJ, Visual Artist
- Instruments: Vocals, Flute, Piano, Guitar
- Years active: 2010–present
- Labels: Warner Music; Armada Music; Atlantic Records; Black Hole Recordings; Dim Mak Records; Mau5trap Records; My Other Side Of The Moon Records; Spirit Soul Records; Ame Records; Taksu Records
- Website: www.denizreno.com

Deniz Reno is a Canadian singer-songwriter, DJ, producer, and visual artist.

Reno began her career in 2010 and gained wider recognition in 2013 for her collaboration with producer Anton Ishutin on a cover of Wicked Game, which accumulated millions of views on YouTube.

Her releases have received support from electronic music artists like Black Coffee, Shimza, Enoo Napa, Above & Beyond, Francis Mercier, Paul Oakenfold, Markus Schulz, Marcus Schossow, Myon & Shane 54, Tiesto and others.

In 2013, her collaboration with Matvey Emerson, “Higher”, was released through Armada Music and appeared on several of the label’s compilation albums. The track was also featured on television shows, including So You Think You Can Dance Paraguay and in national television ads for Canada Philippine Fashion Week.

Reno later collaborated with the electronic duo Moonbeam on the track “Memories”, which appeared on their album Atom and was included in the compilation In Search of Sunrise 13.5 Amsterdam curated by Richard Durand and BT.

In 2015, she performed at Phoenix Concert Theatre in Toronto with Rhys Fulber’s project Conjure One.[7] She contributed vocals to tracks on Conjure One’s album Holoscenic 'Miscreant' and 'Kill the Fear', which charted on the Billboard Dance/Electronic Albums chart.

Reno has also collaborated with other artists including Keys N Krates, contributing to the track “Something Wonderful”, released on the CURA EP via Dim Mak Records. The EP was nominated for Dance Recording of the Year at the Juno Awards in 2019. In 2018 and 2019, she worked with producer and longtime collaborator Matt Lange on releases including “Are You Am I”, 'Ordinary Love', 'Satellite Heart', 'Running Through My Veins' and “Space Between”, the latter issued on Mau5trap.

Reno’s other work has notably appeared on various compilation releases, including projects issued by Pacha / Warner Music Group and Armada Music. She has also been featured in international publications such as Rolling Stone Magazine Africa, Billboard Magazine US, Yak Magazine and Esquire Kazakhstan.

The Narcissus EP was released on November 8, 2018. That same month Esquire Magazine Kazakhstan featured Deniz Reno in a six page profile titled "The Woman We Love", naming her as the first artist born in Kazakhstan to have achieved numerous releases on major international labels.Between 2018 and 2022 Deniz Reno released four solo EPs 'FLY', 'NARCISSUS', 'LOVERS' and 'ACOUSTIC MEMOIR'.

In 2026 Reno released SO REAL EP with South African titans Enoo Napa and Phila De Giant on My Other side of the Moon Records. The release peaked at #6 in top 100 Afro House Releases Worldwide according to Beatport.

Beats of Africa Magazine called Reno "one of the most distinctive crossover voices in Afro House" in their July 2026 feature and interview with the artist.

== In the arts ==
Deniz Rakhmanova has worked as a scenic painter on over 37 feature film and TV productions. Early in life she has had a successful career as a young visual artist in Central Asia, participating in over 24 group and solo shows internationally. She has been the recipient of several young artist achievement awards and diplomas, the most notable being presented to her at the age of 8 in the Palace of the Republic in Almaty by Kazakhstan's First Lady Sara Nazarbayeva.

Her sculpture and prop work on Suicide Squad (2016) has been included in 'Suicide Squad: Behind the Scenes with the Worst Heroes Ever' Volume by Signe Bergstrom published through Harper Collins.

In 2023 Reno appeared as a contributor in Tatler Indonesia's prestigious print magazine arts issue, writing and illustrating an article called 'Art of the Greatest Romances'.

== Other projects ==
In 2020, Reno founded a conscious adventure, travel and lifestyle website The Fearless Nomad, where she writes about travel, wellness, adventure, curates playlists and interviews influential personalities in the fields of entertainment, sports, art and business. The Fearless Nomad has featured interviews with well known personalities like Hollywood Director Chris Fisher, Canadian Olympian Nikkita Holder, American Chess Grandmaster Irina Krush, Actor and UNHCR Ambassador Ger Duany, and Australian BASE Wingsuit Champion Rex Pemberton . Through the Fearless Nomad initiative, Reno acts as a patron for arts and culture, having curated events for artists in Indonesia, Canada and Kazakhstan.

== Personal life ==
Reno is the daughter of sculptor Vagif Rakhmanov and Canadian film industry scenic artist and sculptor Marina Reshetnikova, whose work has been featured in Academy Award and BAFTA winning and nominated films like Nightmare Alley and The Shape of Water. Reno is the youngest niece of Azerbaijani painter Maral Rahmanzadeh.

In 2016 Reno was engaged to Canadian BASE wingsuit proximity flyer and skydiver Graham Dickinson. Dickinson tragically died in a failed wingsuit BASE flight attempt in the Tianmen Mountains, China on January 25, 2017.

== Charity work ==
During the August 2018 earthquakes in Lombok, Indonesia, Reno helped organize community efforts in delivering relief supplies for the victims of the natural disaster.

During the 2020 COVID-19 pandemic in Indonesia, Deniz Reno volunteered for Scholars Of Sustenance Indonesia (SOS Indonesia) - A Global Food Rescue Foundation. Reno has been a longtime patron of the arts and has curated exhibits and fundraisers showcasing young local Indonesian and international talent.

The Diana Award, a UK organization established in the memory of Diana, Princess of Wales which honours young people for their social action and humanitarian work, named Reno one of the judges on their 2022, 2023 and 2024 season panel.

== Discography ==
=== EPs ===
- That Girl (2012)
- Bang Boom (2015)
- Devil In My Head (2015)
- Sometimes/Blue Eyes (2017)
- Fly (2018)
- Narcissus (2018)
- Lovers (2020)
- Acoustic Memoir (2021)
- Te Amo Ibiza EP (2026)
- So Real EP (2026)

=== Singles ===
- Rock My Body (2011)
- That Girl (2012)
- Let Me Know (2012)
- Blame It On Me (2012)
- Higher feat. Matvey Emerson (2013)
- Bang Boom (2015)
- Lovecrime (2015)
- Memories (prod. Moonbeam) (2015)
- Devil In My Head (2015)
- Trouble (2015)
- Wicked Games (2015)
- Love No More (2015)
- Remember (2015)
- Gravity (2016)
- Sobriety (2016)
- Waiting (2016)
- Anaklia's Dream (2016)
- I Got You (2016)
- Sometimes (2017)
- Blue Eyes (2017)
- Fool For You (2017)
- Are You Am I (produced by Matt Lange) (2018)
- Something Wonderful (produced by Keys N Krates) (2018)
- Fly (2018)
- Over (2018)
- Fools Rush In (2018)
- Selfish (2018)
- Miles Away (2018)
- Space Between (produced by Matt Lange) (2019)
- Brightest (2020)
- Forbidden Fruit (2020)
- Lovers (Crash & Burn) (2020)
- Siren's Song (2020)
- Pirates (2020)
- Running Through My Veins (produced by Matt Lange) (2020)
- Lost In Translation (2021)
- Father (2021)
- Stars (2021)
- Faithless (2021)
- Tattoo (2021)
- Ordinary Love (produced by Matt Lange) (2022)
- Satellite Heart (produced by Matt Lange) (2022)
- Nowhere Else (produced by Matt Lange) (2023)
- Too Close (produced by Matt Lange) (2023)
- Nothing Feels Real (produced by Matt Lange) (2023)
- Island Boy (produced by Simon Pipe) (2023)
- Our Love Was Meant To Rule The World (produced by Simon Pipe) (2023)
- Cruel Intentions (2024)
- Give Me More (2024)
- Give Me Your Love (2025)
- Amahoro (produced by Wilson Timba)(2025)
- Udagan (produced with Simon Pipe) (2025)
- Let You Go (produced by Jonathan Rosa) (2025)
- Desert Rose (2026)
- Te Amo Ibiza (produced by Klash Rivera) (2026)
- So Real (produced with Enoo Napa, Phila de Giant) (2026)
- Coffee (produced with Enoo Napa, Phila de Giant) (2026)
- Cheza Ngoma (2026)
- Everybody's Free (2026)

=== Albums ===
- Sometimes/Blue Eyes (2017)
- Fly (2018)
- Narcissus (2018)
- Lovers (2020)
- Acoustic Memoir (2021)
- Te Amo Ibiza (2026)
- So Real (2026)
