= Anna Golubkina =

Russian sculptor (1864–1927)

- Анна Голубкина
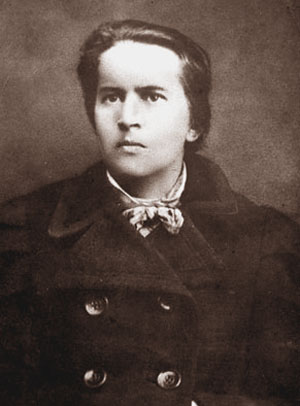
- Born: 18 January 1864; Zaraysk, Ryazan Governorate, Russian Empire
- Died: 7 September 1927 (aged 63); Zaraysk, Moscow Oblast, Russian SFSR, Soviet Union
- Education: Moscow School of Painting, Sculpture and Architecture; Imperial Academy of Arts
- Movement: Impressionism; symbolism

Anna Semyonovna Golubkina (Russian: Анна Семёновна Голубкина; 18 January 1864 – 7 September 1927) was a Russian impressionist sculptor. As the first Russian sculptor to receive the Paris Salon prize, she is regarded as the first female Russian sculptor of note. Golubkina also had an exhibition at the prestigious Alexander III Museum. A crater on Venus is named after her.

== Biography ==
Golubkina was born in Zaraysk, Ryazan gubernia (currently Moscow Oblast), Russia to a family of peasant Old Believers. Her father died when Golubkina was only two years old. She was raised by her grandfather, Policarp Sidorovich Golubkin, who was a profitable vegetable farmer and probably the head of the local Filippians community.

Golubkina did not receive even a primary school education until the age of 25. Despite their total lack of formal schooling, all the children in Golubkin's family were literate and Golubkina's older sister Alexandra later got a nurse (feldsher) diploma. Golubkina's talents in painting and sculpture were discovered by the local art teacher, who recommended that she go to Moscow to study art.

In 1889, she took entrance exams for Otto Gunst's Classes for Elegant Arts, an architecture school. Having no formal education, she failed some exams; but an examiner, sculptor Sergey Volnukhin, challenged other examiners to name a sculptor able to produce anything like her 'Praying old woman'. He convinced them not only to admit Golubkina, but to waive her tuition as well.

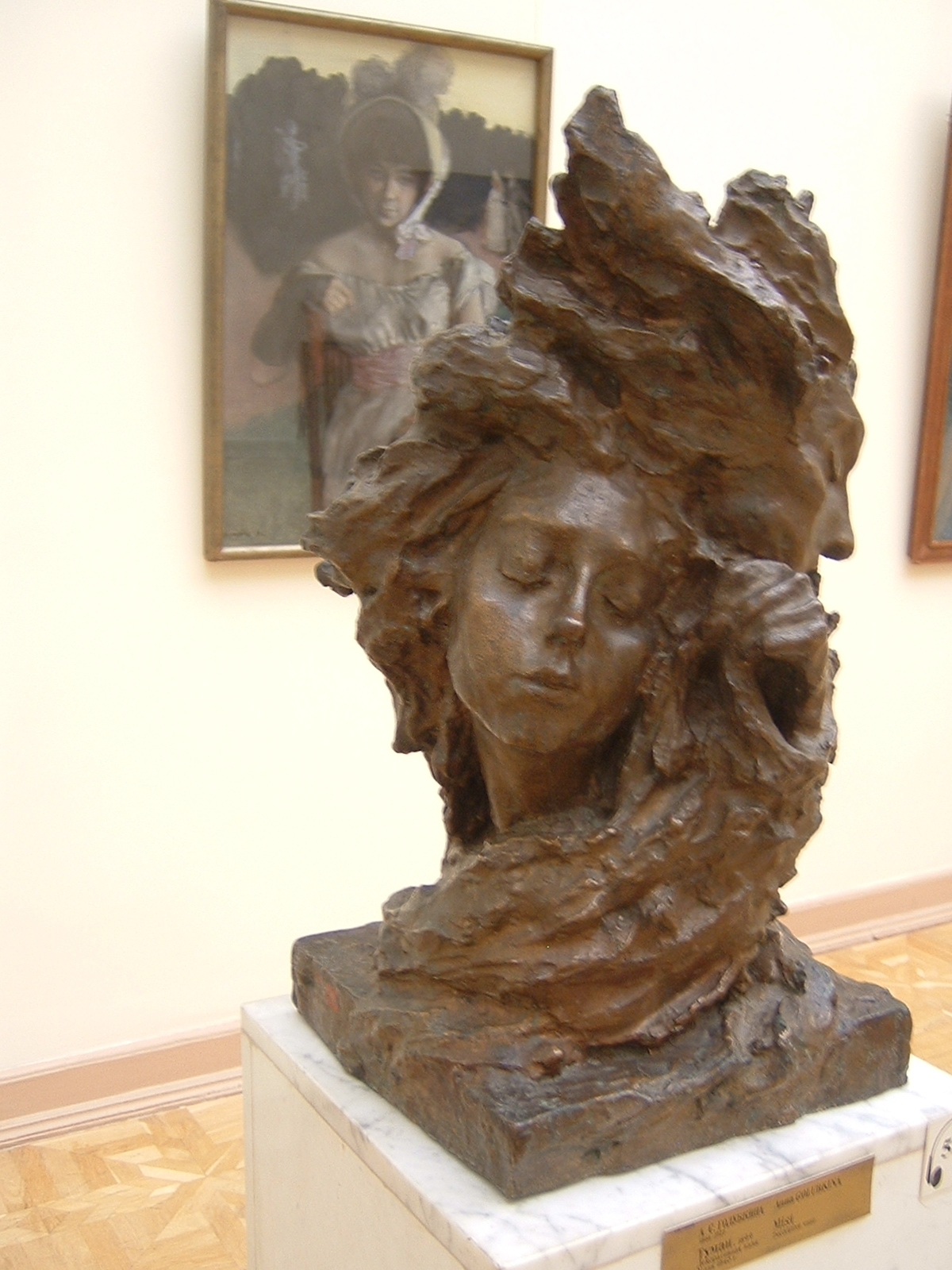
The Mist, 1899

The next year, the school closed due to bankruptcy. Anna entered the Moscow School of Painting, Sculpture and Architecture where she studied from 1890 to 1894 under Professor Sergey Ivanov. One of her classmates was another famous sculptor Sergey Konenkov.

In 1894-1895 she studied at the Imperial Academy of Arts in Saint Petersburg in the studio of famous sculptor Vladimir Beklemishev. According to researchers, Vladimir was the subject of Golubkina's tragic unrequited love, but never knew about it.

In 1895 she went to Paris where she studied at the Académie Colarossi (1895–1897). At that time Russian artists usually went abroad either having some sort of a stipend or sufficient independent income. Golubkina was one of the first of those who came to Paris having almost no money. She literally starved but managed to produce significant sculptures including 'The Iron One'.

In 1897, she briefly returned to Russia, then became an assistant to Auguste Rodin (1897–1899) taking the position of Camille Claudel (she got an offer from Mark Antokolski as well). Rodin requested her work on the hands and legs of his sculptures. At that time, she also produced 'The Old Age', 'The Fire', The Mist and many other original sculptures. In The Old Age she employed a direct allusion with the work of Rodin himself. She used the same model, sitting in the same pose as Rodin's The Thinker which he created 14 years earlier.

In 1901, she returned to Moscow. Her bas relief The Wave installed on the facade of Moscow Art Theatre was considered a symbol of Russian Modernism. She participated in the Russian Revolution of 1905, was arrested and sentenced to one year in prison for distribution of leaflets and was freed due to her bad health. She also produced a number of sculptural portraits, including portraits of Andrei Bely, Alexei Remizov, Leo Tolstoy, and Karl Marx.

Golubkina was initially very enthusiastic about the 1917 October Revolution, but refused to work with the Soviet Government (including the Lenin's plan of Monumental propaganda) after the execution of the former members of the State Duma. Eventually she agreed to teach in VKhUTEMAS, where she would teach Tatar sculptor Baqi Urmançe.

Anna Golubkina died in 1927, while working on the sculpture of Leo Tolstoy. She had surgery and was forbidden to handle heavy items. However, work on the large wooden sculpture required a lot of physical effort. Golubkina felt quite ill and went to Zaraysk to her sister, Alexandra Golubkina, expecting Alexandra to help her. She died a few days after arriving there.

Golubkina's studio in Moscow became a museum in 1932. It was the first Russian museum of that type.

== Selected works ==
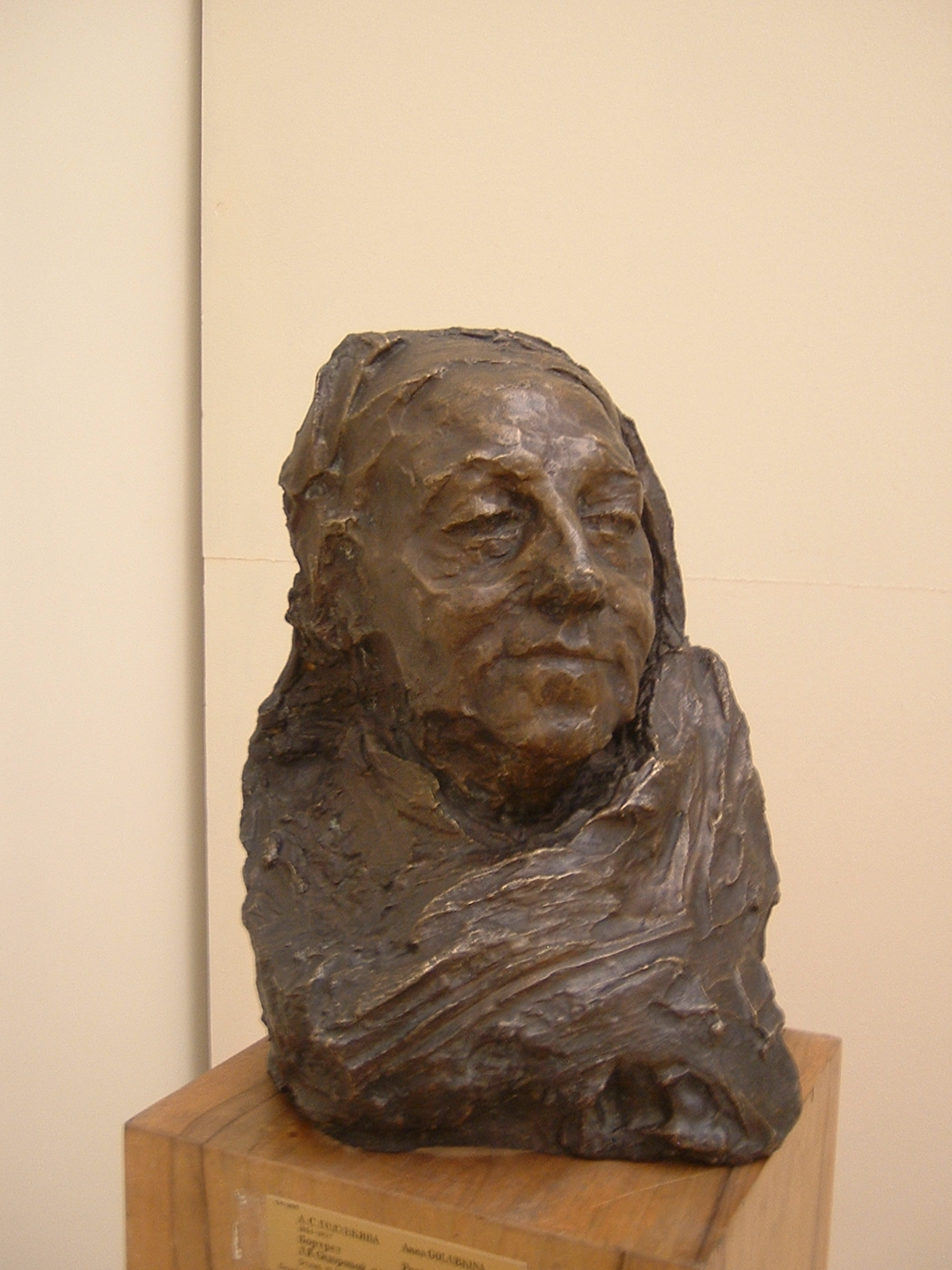
L.I. Sidorova, 1906

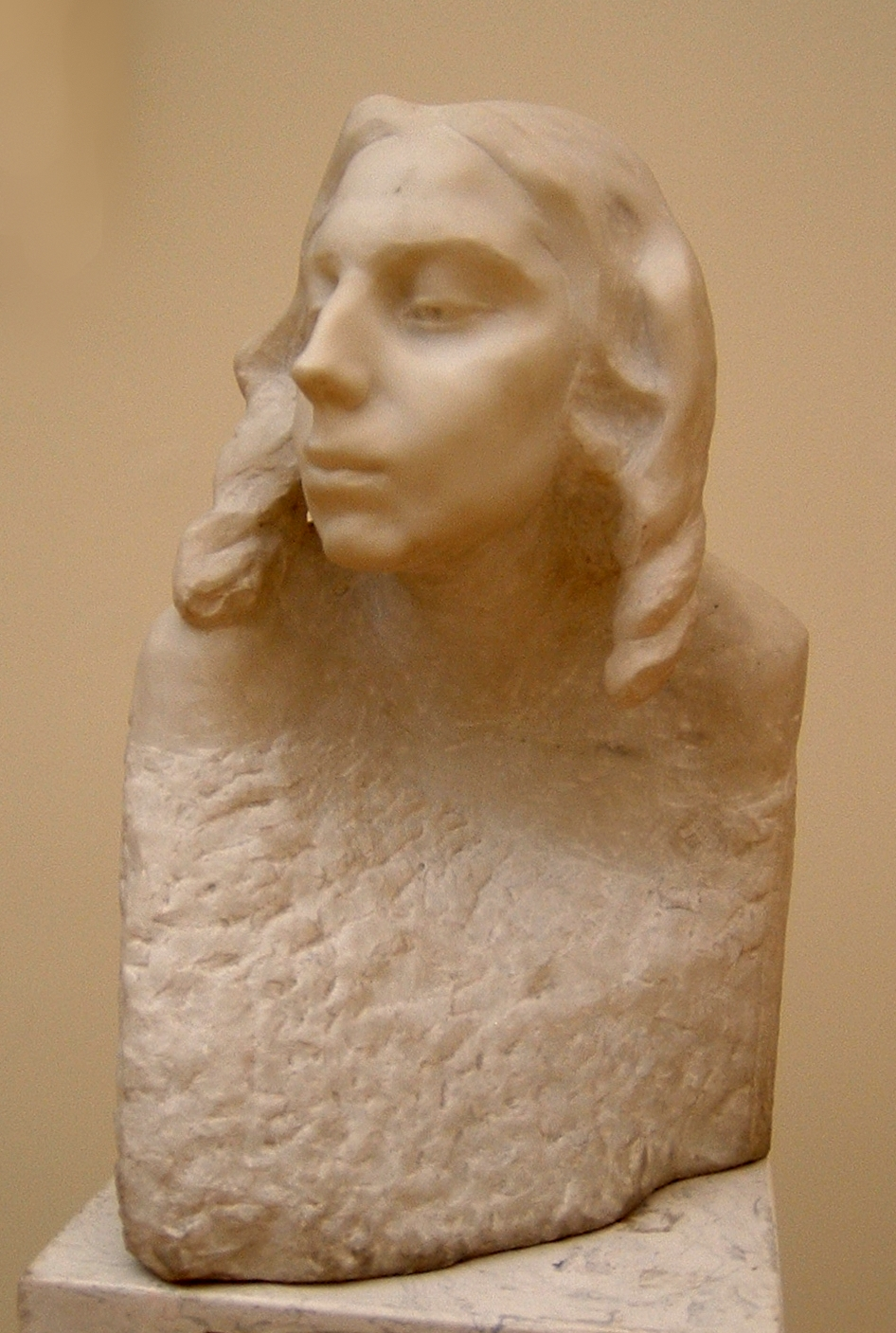
Sculptor E.D. Nikiforova-Kirpichnikova, 1908

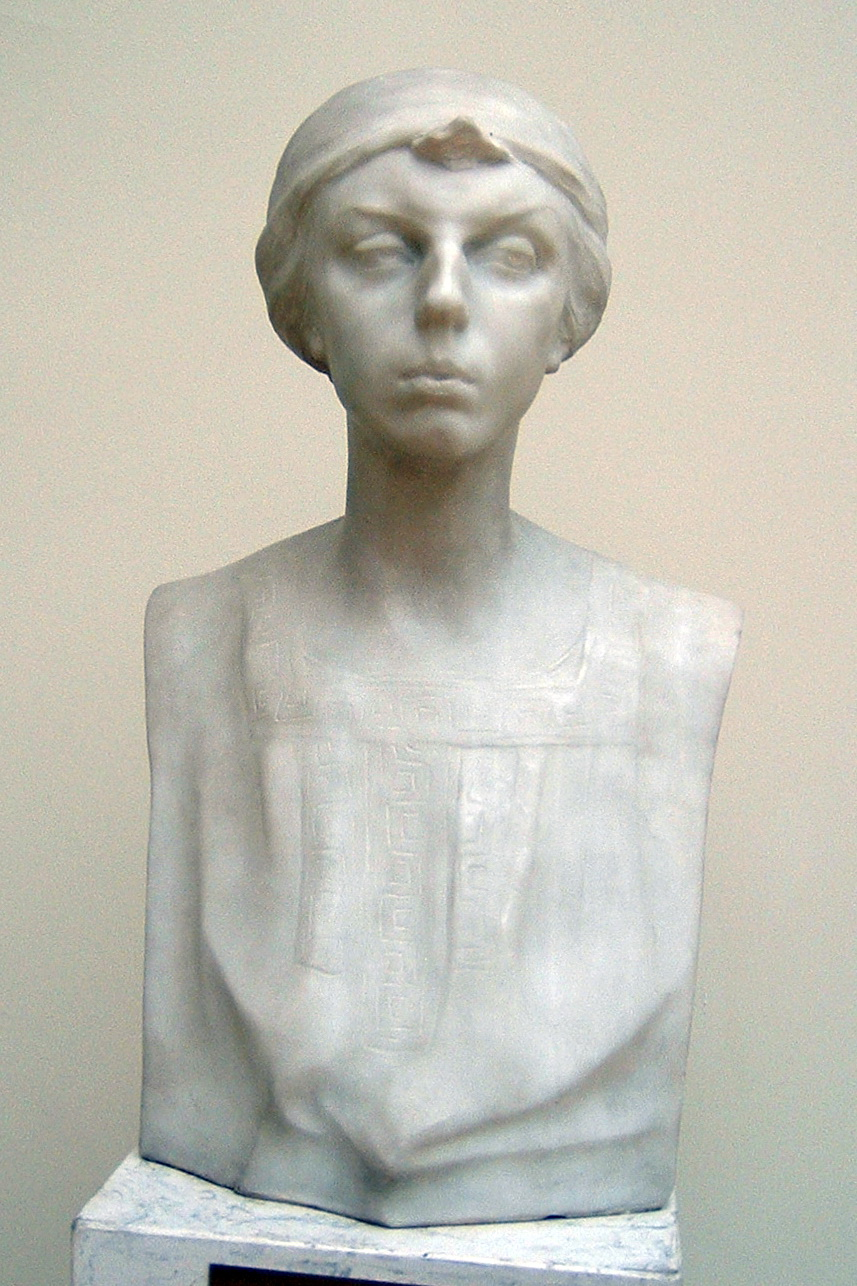
E.P. Nosova-Ryabushinskaya, 1912

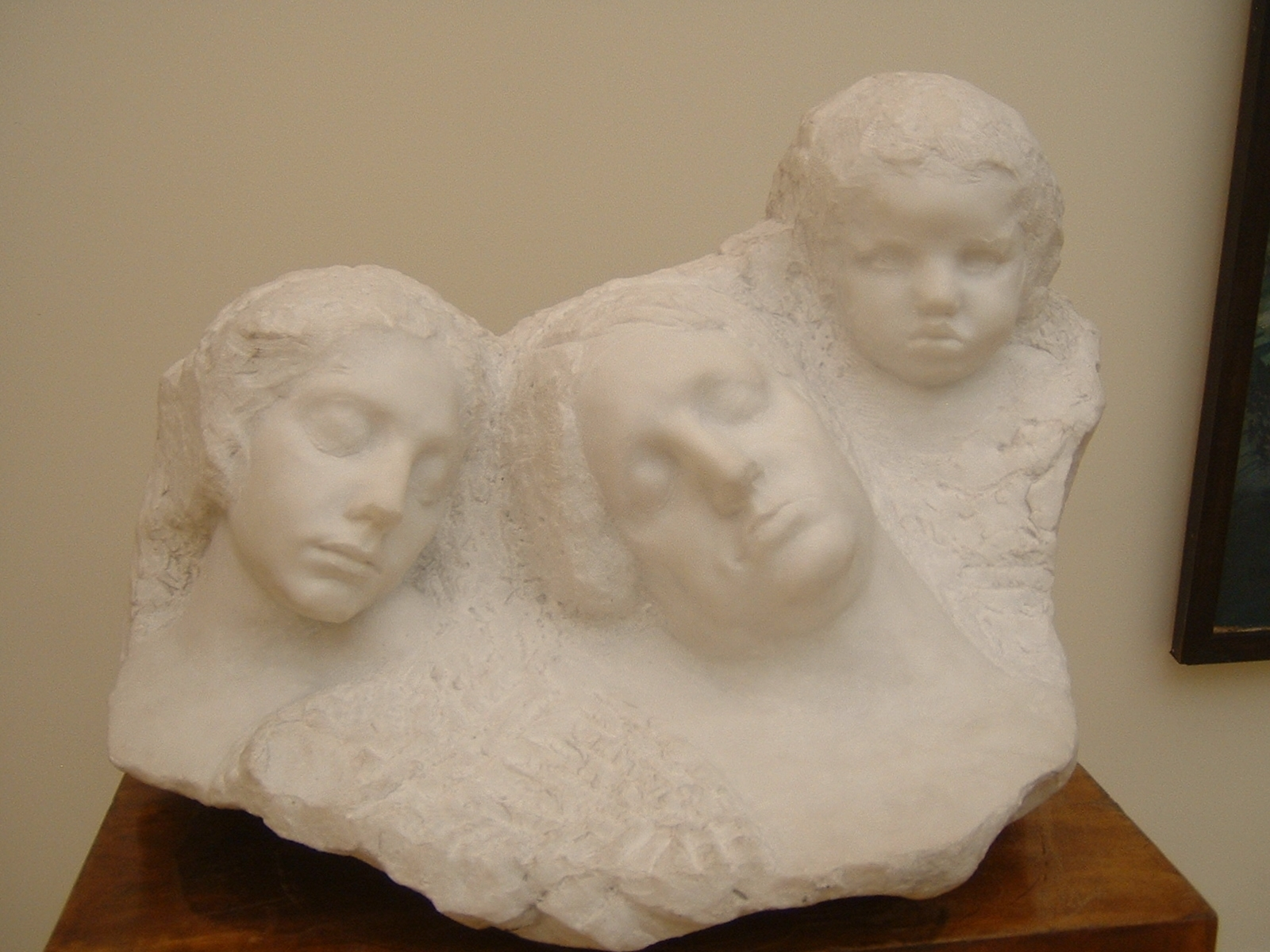
Sleepers, 1912
