= Golubkina (crater) =

Crater on Venus

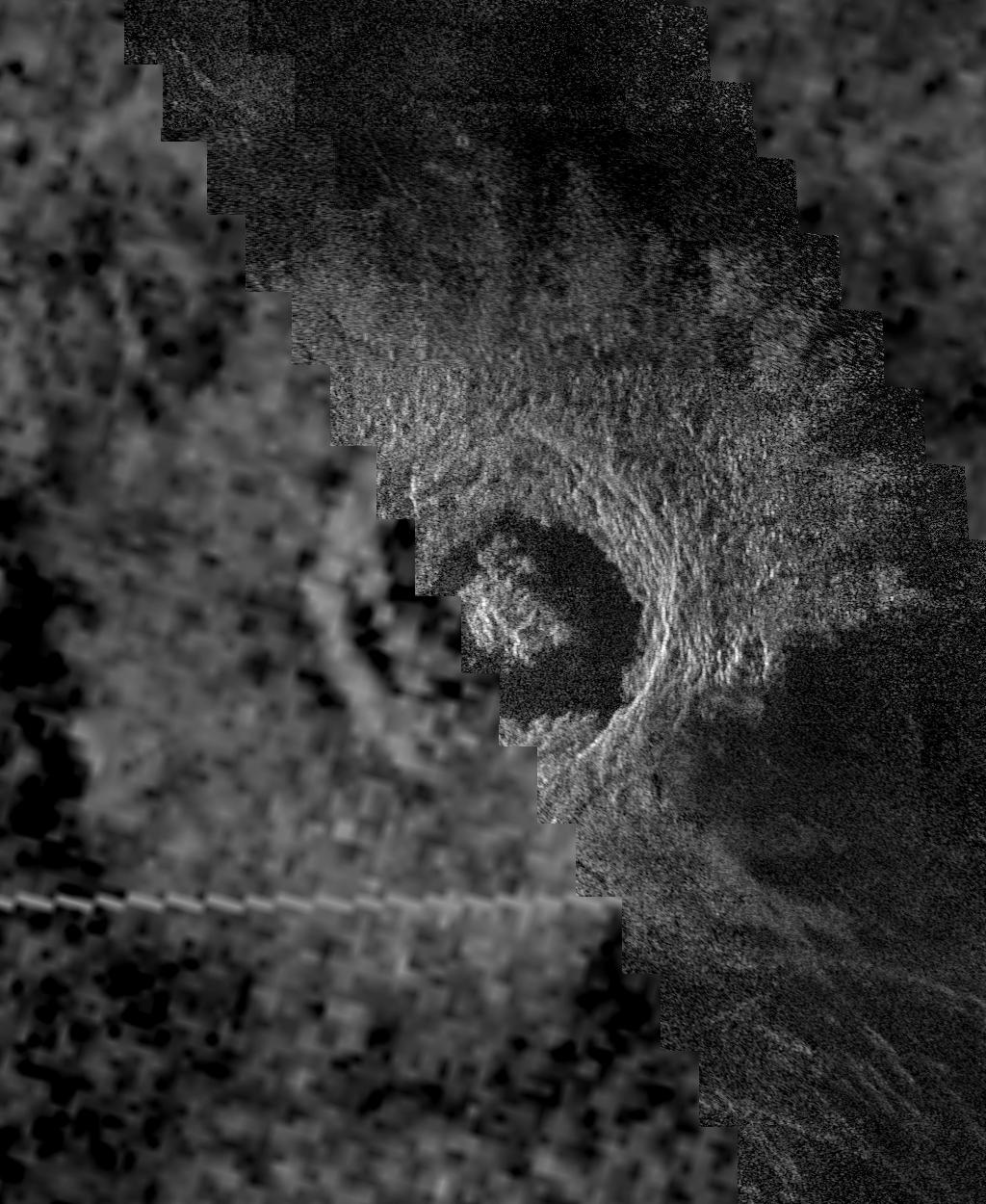
- Radar image of Golubkina combining high and low resolution data
- Location: Venus
- Coordinates: 60.3°N 286.5°E
- Diameter: 28.4 km (17.6 mi)
- Eponym: Anna Golubkina

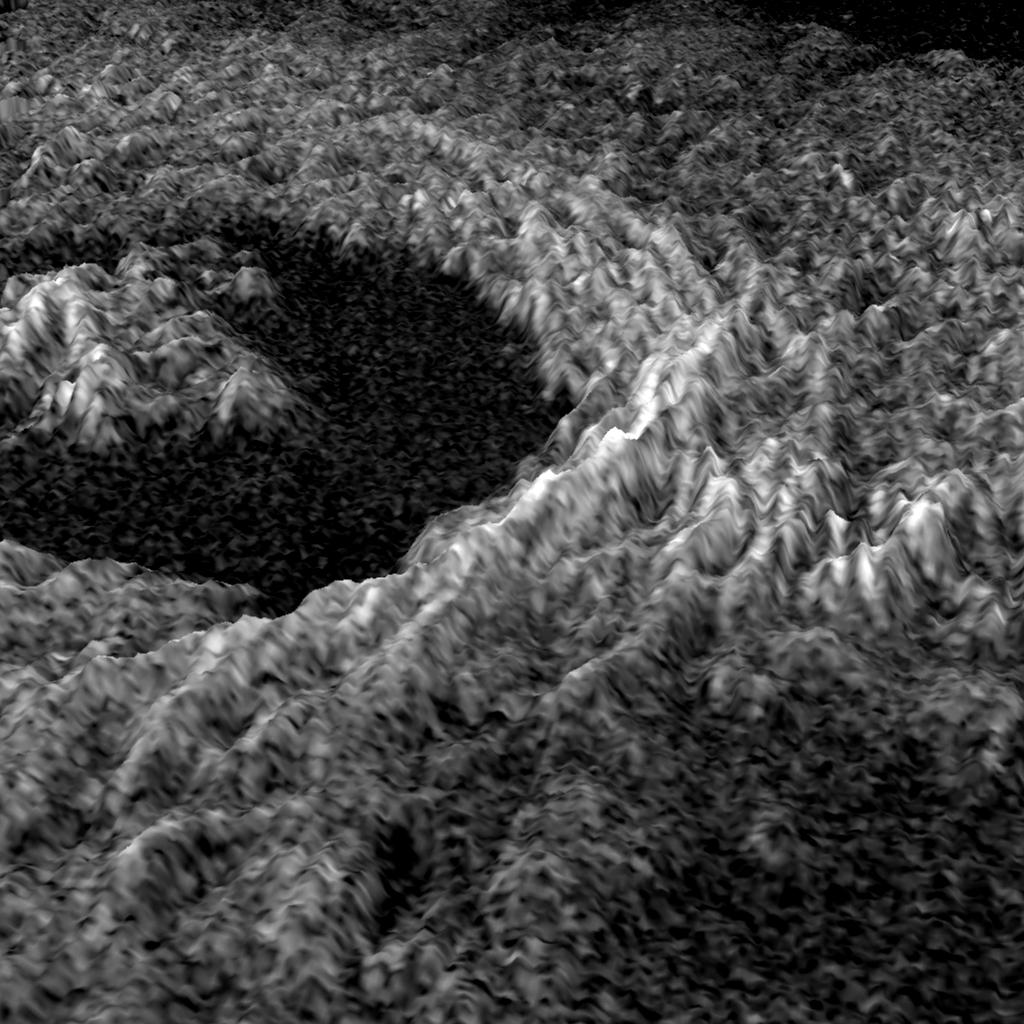
3D perspective of Golubkina crater

Golubkina is a crater on Venus. It was named in 1985 after the Soviet sculptor Anna Golubkina.

Golubkina is characterized by terraced inner walls and a central peak, typical of large impact craters on the Earth, Moon, and Mars. The terraced inner walls form at late stages in the formation of an impact crater, due to collapse of the initial cavity formed by the meteorite impact. The central peak forms due to rebound of the inner crater floor.

The smoothness of the floor may be due to ponding of volcanic lava flows in the crater floor. The rough, blocky morphology of the crater ejecta and the sharp terraced crater wall suggest that this feature is relatively young.
