= Wróbel =

Wróbel (Polish pronunciation: [ˈvrubɛl]; meaning "sparrow") is a Polish surname. The same surname is sometimes spelled Wrubel or Vrubel, reflecting its pronunciation. Czech, Slovak, and Slovene cognates include Vrabel, Vrabec, and Brabec.

== People ==
- Adolf Wróbel (1930–2014), Polish ice hockey player
- Agata Wróbel (born 1981), Polish weightlifter
- Alfred Wróbel (1927–1993), Polish ice hockey player
- Andrzej Wróbel, Polish Paralympic athlete
- Antoni Wróbel (1923–1988), Polish ice hockey player
- Brian Wrobel (born 1982), American footballer
- David Wrobel (born 1991), German athlete
- Józef Wróbel (born 1952), Polish Catholic bishop, Bishop of Helsinki
- Henryk Wróbel (1934–2024), Polish football player
- Leon Wróbel (1954–2025), Polish sailor
- Marian Wróbel (1907–1960), Polish chess player
- Marzena Wróbel (born 1963), Polish politician
- Michał Wróbel (born 1980), Polish footballer
- Paweł Wróbel (born 1984), Polish organist
- Piotr Wróbel (born 1953), Polish-Canadian historian
- Tomasz Wróbel (born 1982), Polish footballer

== See also ==
- Tilmann Wröbel
