= Vrabcova =

Vrabcova or Vrabcová is a feminine form of:

- Vrabac (surname), South Slavic surname
- Vrabec, Czech and Slovak surname
