= Sergei Volnukhin =

Russian sculptor

External image
- Sergey Malyutin, Sergei Volnukhin, 1914, oil on canvas; Dogadin Gallery, Astrakhan

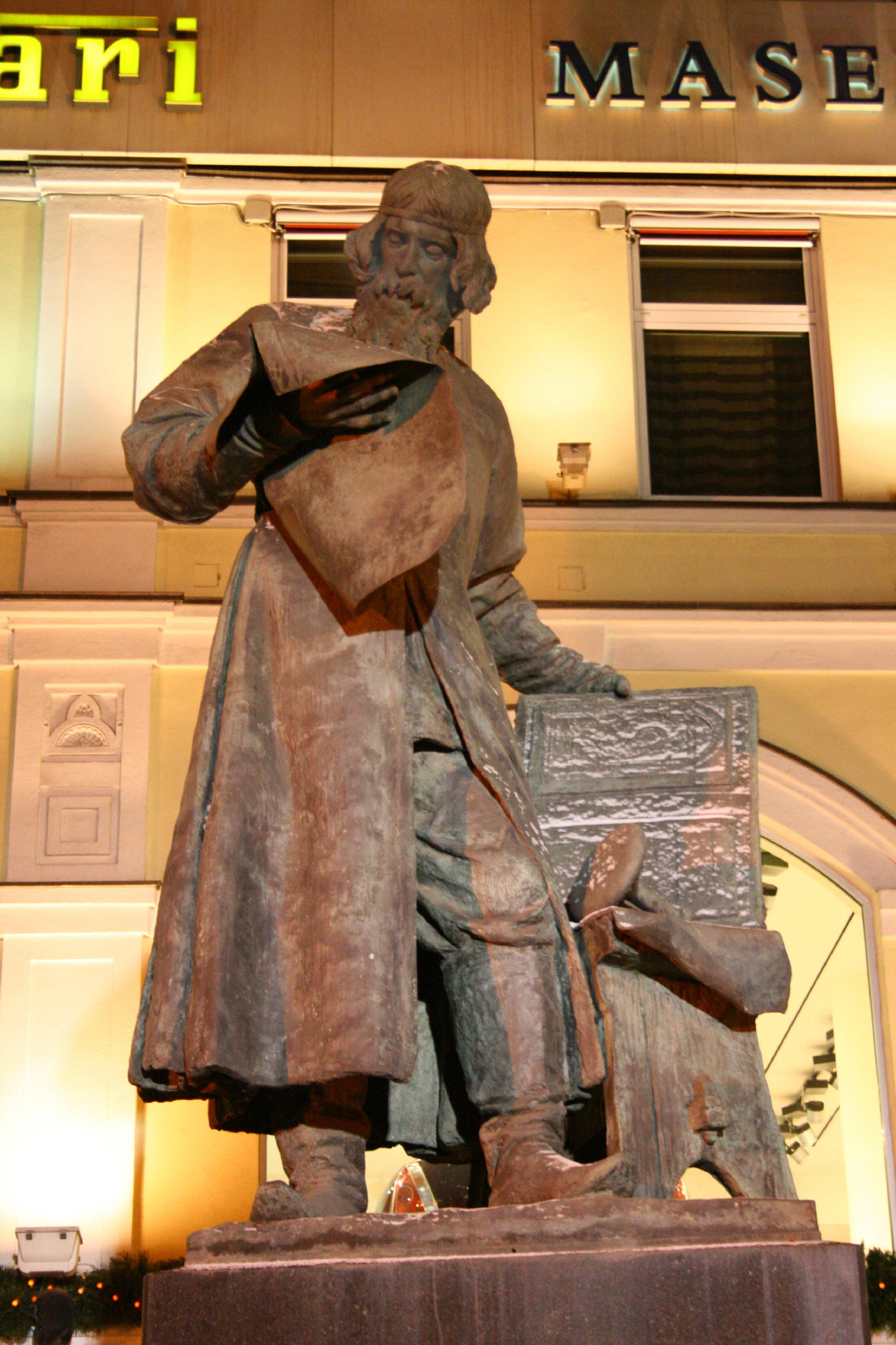
Monument to Ivan Fyodorov, 1909

Sergei Mikhailovich Volnukhin (1859–1921) was a Russian sculptor, best known for his instruction to a generation of Russian artists at the Moscow School of Painting, Sculpture and Architecture, teaching alongside Prince Paolo Troubetzkoy.

== Biography ==
Volnukhin was born at 1859 in Moscow, in the family of a merchant. Studied at the Moscow school of painting, sculpture and architecture (MUZHVZ, 1873-1881 and 1883-1886), and also at the St. Petersburg Academy of arts (1882). He lived in Moscow.

Among Volnukhin's students:

- Anna Golubkina (1889-1890)
- Sergey Konenkov (1892-1896)
- Nikolay Andreyev (1892-1901)
- Alexander Matveyev (1899-1902)
- Natalia Goncharova (1901-1904)
- Stepan Erzia (1902-1906)
- Aleksei Babichev (1907-1912)
- Boris Korolev (circa 1910)
- Isaac Itkind (1912-1913)
- Arkady Plastov (1914-1917)

Notable among his own work is the 1909 monument to Ivan Fyodorov in Moscow (with architect Ivan Mashkov.) Volnukhin's papers are held at the Tretyakov Gallery.
