= Henryk Wróbel =

Henryk Wróbel can refer to:

- Henryk Wróbel (footballer)
- Henryk VIII Wróbel
- Henryk Wróbel (linguist)
