= Itkin =

Itkin (Hebrew: איטקין), feminine Itkina is an Ashkenazi Jewish matronymic surname derived from the belittling diminutive Itka of the given name Judith (name). Notable people with the surname include:

- Alisha Ann Itkin, American freestyle and dance-pop singer
- Anatoly Itkin (born 1931), Soviet and Russian artist
- David Itkin (born 1957), American conductor and composer
- Ivan Itkin (1936–2020), American politician
- Maria Itkina (1932–2020), Soviet Olympic runner
- Nick Itkin (born 1999), American Olympic bronze medalist foil fencer, junior world champion

== See also ==
- Itkind
