= Wrabel (surname) =

Wrabel is a surname. It most commonly refers to Stephen Wrabel (born 1989), an American singer, and songwriter and musician, known mononymously as Wrabel.

Other people with the surname include:

- Jakub Wrąbel (born 1996), Polish football player

== See also ==
- Wróbel
