= Veréb =

Veréb, Vereb is Hungarian surname, which means "sparrow":

- Ed Vereb (1934–2014), American football player
- István Veréb (born 1987), Hungarian wrestler
- Krisztián Veréb (born 1977), Hungarian sprint canoer
- Mike Vereb, American politician from Pennsylvania

== See also ==
- Vili, a veréb ("Willy the Sparrow"), a 1988 Hungarian animated film directed by József Gémes
- Vereb (German: Spatzendorf), a village in Fejér county, Hungary
- Vrabec (Czech surname)
