= Vrabel =

Vrabel, Vrábel, Vrábeľ, or Vrabelj is a surname. It means "sparrow" in some dialects of Czech, Slovak, Slovene, and related languages. It is cognate with the Polish surname Wróbel.

Notable people with the surname include:

- Jaroslav Vrábel (born 1971), Czech footballer
- Martin Vrábeľ (born 1955), Czech long-distance runner
- Mike Vrabel (born 1975), American football coach
- Ondrej Vrábel (philanthropist) (born 2001), Slovak philanthropist and programmer
- Ondrej Vrábel (footballer) (born 1999), Slovak footballer
- Tanja Vrabel (born 1990), Slovenian footballer
- Tyler Vrabel (born 2000), American football player
