= Brabec =

Brabec (feminine: Brabcová) is a Czech surname. It is a dialectal form of the word vrabec (meaning 'sparrow') and of the surname Vrabec. Brabec was first documented as a surname in 1405. A Germanized form of the surname is Brabetz. Notable people with the surname include:

- Alexa Brabec (born 2004), American skier
- Antonín Brabec (canoeist) (1946–2017), Czech slalom canoeist
- Antonín Brabec (rugby union) (born 1973), Czech rugby player and coach
- Christoph J. Brabec (born 1966), Austrian scientist
- Erich Brabec (born 1977), Czech footballer
- Felicia Brabec (born c. 1974), American politician and clinical psychologist
- Jakub Brabec (born 1992), Czech footballer
- Jaroslav Brabec (1949–2018), Czech track and field athlete
- Richard Brabec (born 1966), Czech politician
- Ricky Brabec (born 1991), American motorcycle racer
- Vladimír Brabec (1934–2017), Czech actor
- Zuzana Brabcová (1959–2015), Czech writer

== See also ==
- Christina Brabetz (born 1993), South African-German violinist
