= Isaac Itkind =

Russian and Soviet sculptor

Isaac Yakovlevich Itkind [app. 1871, Smarhon' (Smorgonie), near Vilnius, Russian Empire, present-day Belarus - February 14, 1969, Alma-Ata (present-day Almaty, Kazakhstan)] was a distinguished Russian and Soviet sculptor from Lithuanian Jewish origin. A self-taught primitivist and a rabbi, only aged 39 did he start his studies in art in Vilno (now Vilnius), and aged 42 years, his studies in sculpture with famous Russian sculptor Sergei Volnukhin at the School of Sculpture and Architecture in Moscow. Itkind's favorite style was wooden sculptures of people. The uniqueness of Itkind's creativity was in his genius to “see a soul in the wooden slob” as he often relayed to his creations. "To Isaac Itkind it is important that his sculptures should think and should stimulate thought". The famous artist, Marc Chagall, a personal friend of Itkind, once said: “ Itkind is the Van Gogh of sculpture”. After the Soviet revolution, the tragic events of the Great Purge threw Itkind's life into oblivion - and his masterpieces followed for decades. He was falsely declared dead in 1937. Itkind's long and unique life – full of tragic events – nourished his genius creativity. (Honored Artist of the Kazakh SSR (1968), member of the Union of Artists of the USSR).

== Early life ==
Isaac Itkind claimed that he was born in 1871 in the town of Smarhon', in the Vilnius province of the Russian Empire. Similar to his father, he was a Hassidic rabbi teaching Tanakh (Hebrew Bible). The turning point in his life was accidental when, at age of 26, he discovered a book about the famous sculptor Mark Antokolsky. Itkind was so impressed by the sculptures of Antokolsky that he started chiseling and sculpting himself. This new “hobby” was inappropriate for the rabbi and disapproved by his family and neighbors. Then a travel journalist, Peretz Hirshbein, wrote an article about the unique gift of self-taught Isaac to the newspaper, which made Itkind famous and eventually brought him to Vilno (now Vilnius) where in 1910 he joined the drawing school with distinguished artist Ferdynand Ruszczyc. In 1911, Itkind moved to Moscow, Russia, where he was accepted by famous sculptor Sergei Volnukhin to study in his workshop at the School of Sculpture and Architecture in 1912-1913.

== Self-taught Sculptor (1905 – 1916) ==
Itkind's early works were predominantly dedicated to the portraits and scenes of small Jewish towns. Itkind's first publish exhibition – in Vilno in 1915 – included his wooden works “Victims of Inquisition,” “Padre,” “Bitter Laughter,” “The Smiling Jew,” “The Crazy Man,” and “Noah’s Arch.” (The newspaper “North-West Voice,” «Северо-западный голос» Jan 1, 1915)

== Early Career (1916-1937) ==
The works performed by Itkind before 1918 were devoted to the theme of grief ("Bitter laughter,” "The Crazy Man,” and "Moralist"). His favorite material was wood. Itkind's sculptures impressed the famous Russian Soviet writer Maxim Gorky, who in 1918 organized the first Itkind personal art exhibition in Soviet Russia (in the Jewish theater Habima). Of the 42 sculptures presented at 1918 exhibition, only three survived until today: "Father"(sometimes named “Self-portrait,” in private collection), "Humpbacked" ( in private collection), "Jewish Melody" (The State Russian Museum, St. Petersburg) . After the Revolution, Issac Itkind joined Mark Chagall as a teacher in the Moscow labor colony "III International" near Moscow for homeless children in Malakhovka. Between 1917-1937 he had three personal art exhibitions in Moscow and Leningrad (now St. Petersburg) and participated in another 18 exhibitions with other artists. In 1927, Itkind moved to Leningrad where he created works devoted to various historical and cultural figures: portraits of Lenin, F. Lassalle, K. Marx, F. Engels, and many portraits of the famous Russian poet Alexander Pushkin. At the exhibition dedicated to the 15th Anniversary of Soviet Sculpture Itkind presented his famous “ Victims of fascism pogrom: the head of the composer Matz, killed by “browns”, 1927, (now in The State Russian Museum, St Petersburg) His prolific contribution to the Art Exhibition in Hermitage dedicated to 100 years of death of Pushkin in 1937 included 100 pieces of sculptures. The sculpture “Dying Pushkin” won the first prize. Isaac Itkind was famous in the USSR and abroad. His masterpieces were bought by famous art collectors, such as Savva Mamontov, prior to the revolution and later by famous people visiting the USSR, including French businessman Leon Blum and brother of Theodore Roosevelt. It was a known fact that both Blum and Roosevelt tried to persuade Itkind to leave USSR and move to the West by offering him help, but Itkind refused. In the 1920-30s Itkind was considered a living genius along with Chagall and Picasso, and one of the leading Russian sculptors of 20th century along with Sergej Konenkov and Stepan Erzia. After the exhibition in France in 1937, Itkind was arrested by the KGB, and then was announced dead in the same year.

== Social Life in 1912-1936. ==
Many famous poets, writers and artists such as Maxim Gorky, Vsevolod Meyerhold, Sergej Konenkov, Maximilian Voloshin, Vladimir Mayakovsky, Sergej Yesenin, Aleksey Tolstoy, and Mark Chagall, became close friends of Itkind and adored his creativity. Itkind was a remarkable storyteller and writer. From his oral stories, famous writers and directors – Maxim Gorky, Vladimir Mayakovsky, Sergei Yesenin, Vsevolod Meyerhold, persuaded Itkind to start writing. Alexey Tolstoy in 1934 published several Itkind's storied in the popular "Star" magazine.

== 1937-1969 ==
In 1937, after an exhibition of Itkind's sculpture “Pushkin in Chains” in Paris, France, Itkind was arrested for Japanese espionage and placed into the jail Kresty, where he was beaten, his ribs were broken and eardrums ruptured. Soon after, he was exiled to Siberia, and later to Kazakhstan. The whole world until 1944 believed that Itkind was killed or died in the camps in 1937, it was this date of death that was indicated in the signatures to his sculptures and in literature.

Since 1938, Isaak Itkind lived in the village Zerenda, Kazakhstan, in profound poverty. http://www.pkzsk.info/isaak-itkind-skulptor-voskresshij-v-kazaxstane/ At the same time, no one knew that "a half-savage old sorcerer eating roots, living in a dugout and collecting old stumps" was a world-famous sculptor. In 1944 with the help of brave people, who under the risk of being accused with helping “an enemy of the people,” Itkind moved to Alma-Ata (now Alma-Aty), the capital of Kazakhstan that time. Not much is known about Itkind's life until 1956.

=== Alma-Ata, Kazakhstan, 1956–1969 ===
In 1956 Itkind got a job in the Alma-Ata State Theater as a decorator during the daytime, and at night chiseled sculptures from wood in the basement of the theater. During his time in Alma-Ata Itkind created sculptural portraits of famous and simple Kazakh people “Akyn Dzhambul”, “Amangeldy”, “Abay”. Two years later, in 1958, the new young theater artist decided to examine the basement of the theater, where he discovered portraits and compositions that later became famous: “Paul Robeson” (1956), “The Tree-Thinker “(1956), “The Laughing Old Man” (1958), “"Song"” (1960). Nearly all Itkind’s sculptures created in Kazakhstan are currently in The A. Kasteyev State Museum of Arts in Almaty, Kazakhstan. According to some memoirs, approximately a year prior to his death, Isaac Itkind stopped carving and returned to his religious roots, as he was spending all days sitting with kipa on his head and reading Tanakh (Jewish Bible). He died in the city of Alma-Ata in 1969.

Some works of Isaac Itkind are publicly exhibited and some are kept in Russia’s museums: The State Russian Museum and The National Pushkin Museum in St. Petersburg, as well as in the museums of Kazakhstan, France and the USA. During his life, Isaac Itkind was known to generously present his sculptures to acquaintances and friends, therefore, the majority of his works created before 1956 are either lost or in private collections.

In 1967, a young filmmaker from Kazakhstan, Ararat Mashanov, produced a 20-minute documentary about Itkind "Touching Eternity”.
