= Boris Korolyov =

Soviet sculptor

- Борис Королёв
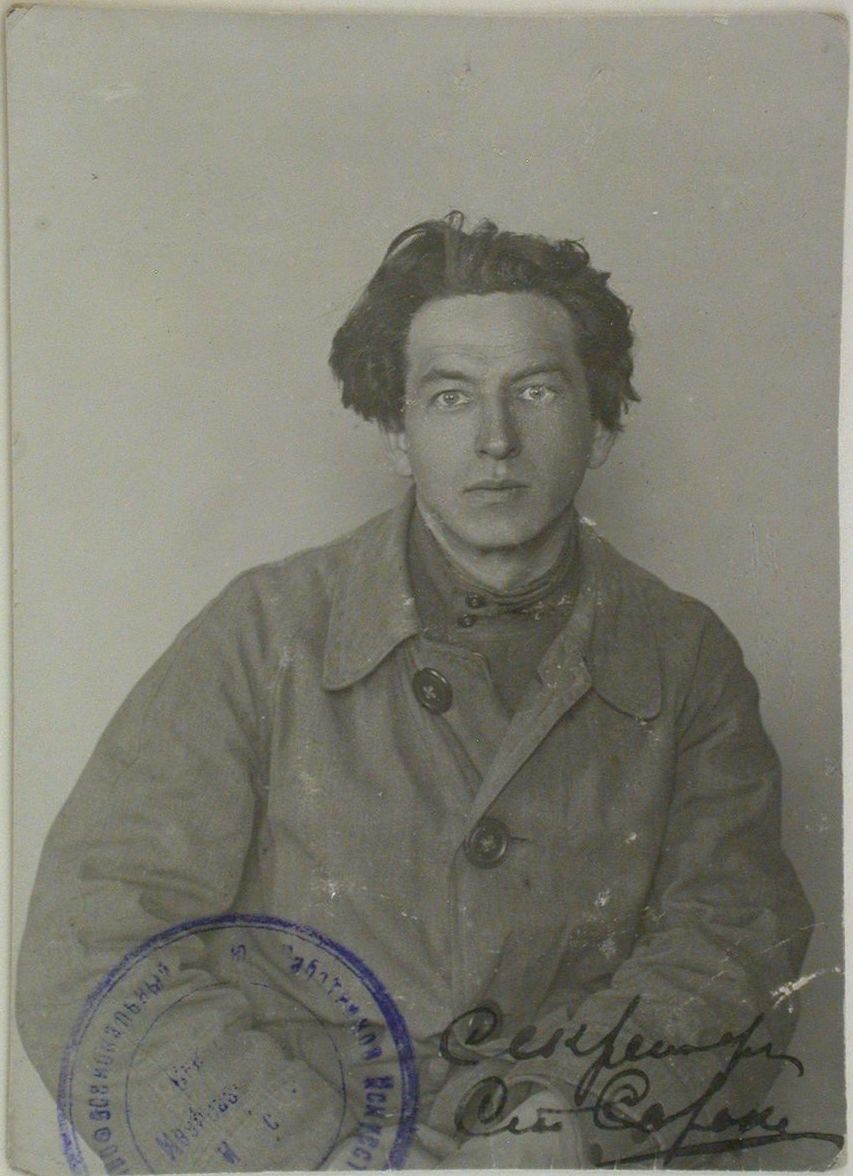
- Born: 1 September 1885; Moscow, Russian Empire
- Died: 18 June 1963 (aged 78); Moscow, Russian SFSR, Soviet Union
- Education: Lomonósov Moscow State University: Faculty of Physics and Mathematics (department of natural science) (1903–); Faculty of History and History of Art; Moscow School of Painting, Sculpture and Architecture (in the class of S. Volnúkhin) (1910–1913).
- Known for: Monumental sculpture
- Movement: Realism; impressionism; cubism

Boris Danilovich Korolyov (Russian: Борис Данилович Королёв; 1 September 1885 – 18 June 1963) was a Soviet sculptor-monumentalist, teacher and public figure.

== Biography ==
As an artist Korolyov stood at the origins of the Soviet school of sculpture, its mainstream, but he also was one of the leading figures in the avant-garde movement. In the 1920s he played a prime role in the realization of Lenin's plan of monumental propaganda. In his sculptural works Korolyov combined Realism with elements of Impressionism and Cubism.

Born in Moscow and educated at the Moscow School of Painting, Sculpture and Architecture under Sergei Volnukhin, Korolyov was a committed revolutionary, deported twice for his political activity, and a leading figure of avant-garde sculpture in revolutionary Russia.

He was an active participant in the execution of Lenin's Monumental Propaganda Plan of April 1918, which encouraged the destruction of Tsarist monuments and the rapid production of Soviet-themed sculptures and bas-reliefs. However, Korolyov's rapidly produced 1919 concrete statue of Mikhail Bakunin, done in a Cubo-Futurist style and set up in Moscow, proved to be deeply unpopular and was dismantled within weeks.

Despite changing tastes, Korolyov continued working in Cubist style into the 1920s, and became professor of sculpture at the Soviet state art school, Vkhutemas. In 2009 he was the subject of a major retrospective at the Tretyakov Gallery.

Korolyov is buried in Novodevichy Cemetery.

== Significant works ==
His work includes:

- the granite Fighters of the Revolution in Saratov, completed in 1925, with a cubist base
- bronze and granite figure of Nikolay Bauman, Moscow, 1931
- a number of statues of Lenin, including a bronze of Lenin in Independence Square of Tashkent, completed in 1936 and replaced in 1991

== Gallery ==
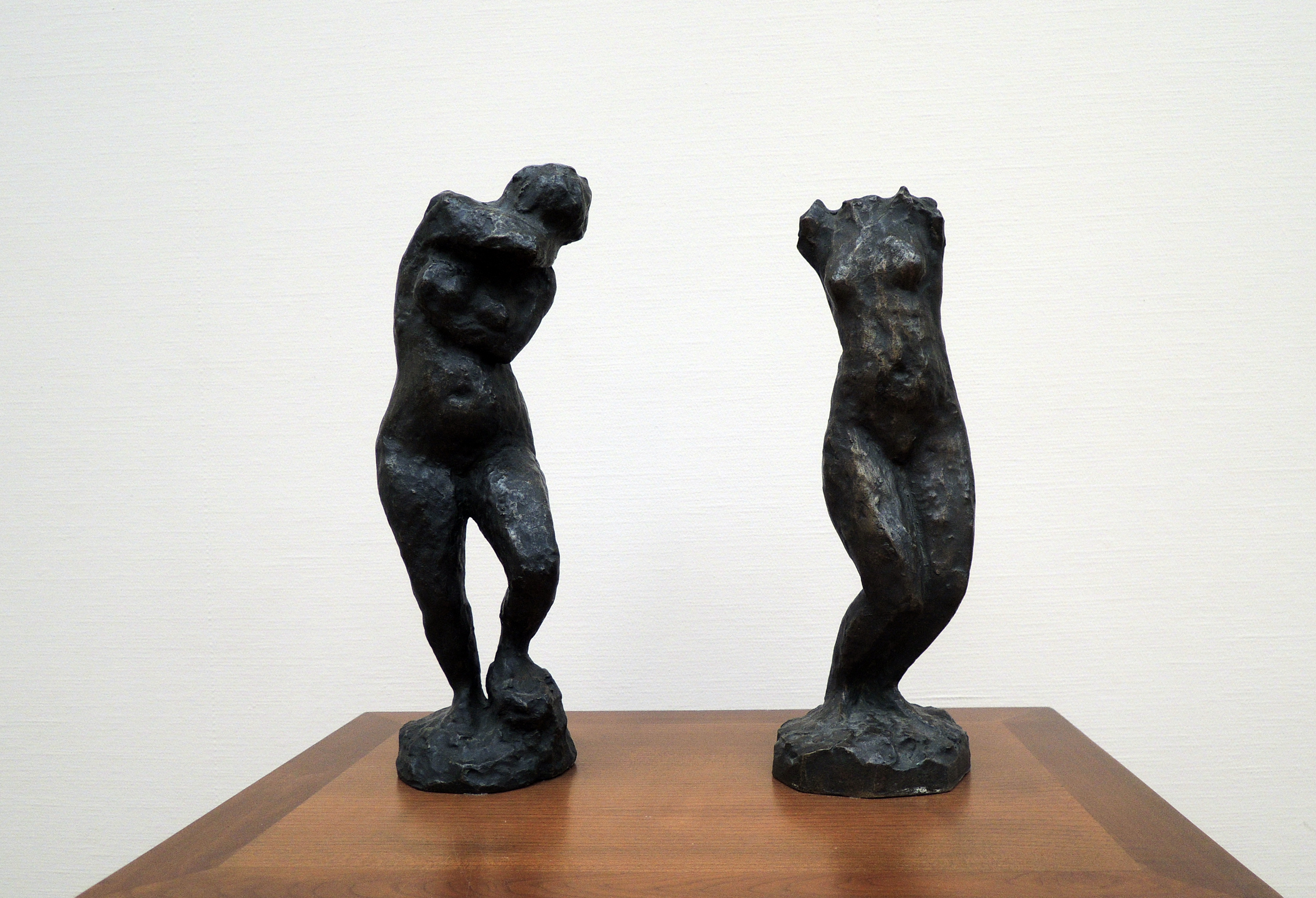
Women's figure (1916)

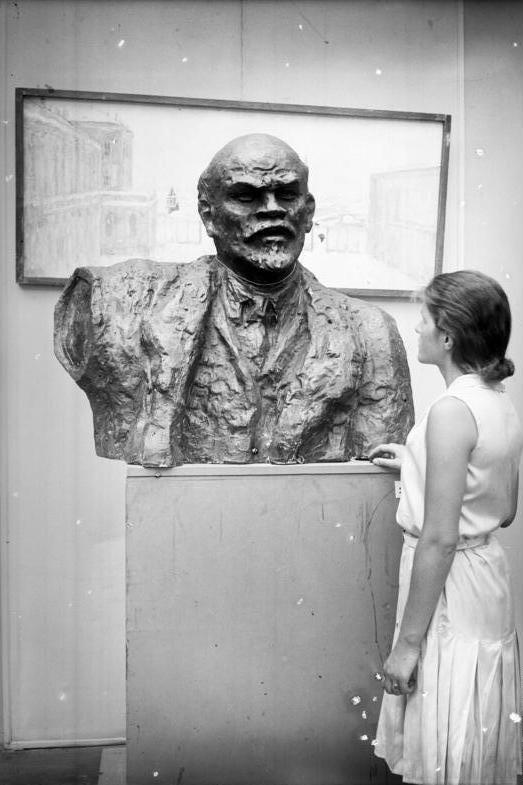
Vladimir Lenin's marble portrait (1923)
