= Ivan Mashkov =

Russian architect

Ivan Pavlovich Mashkov
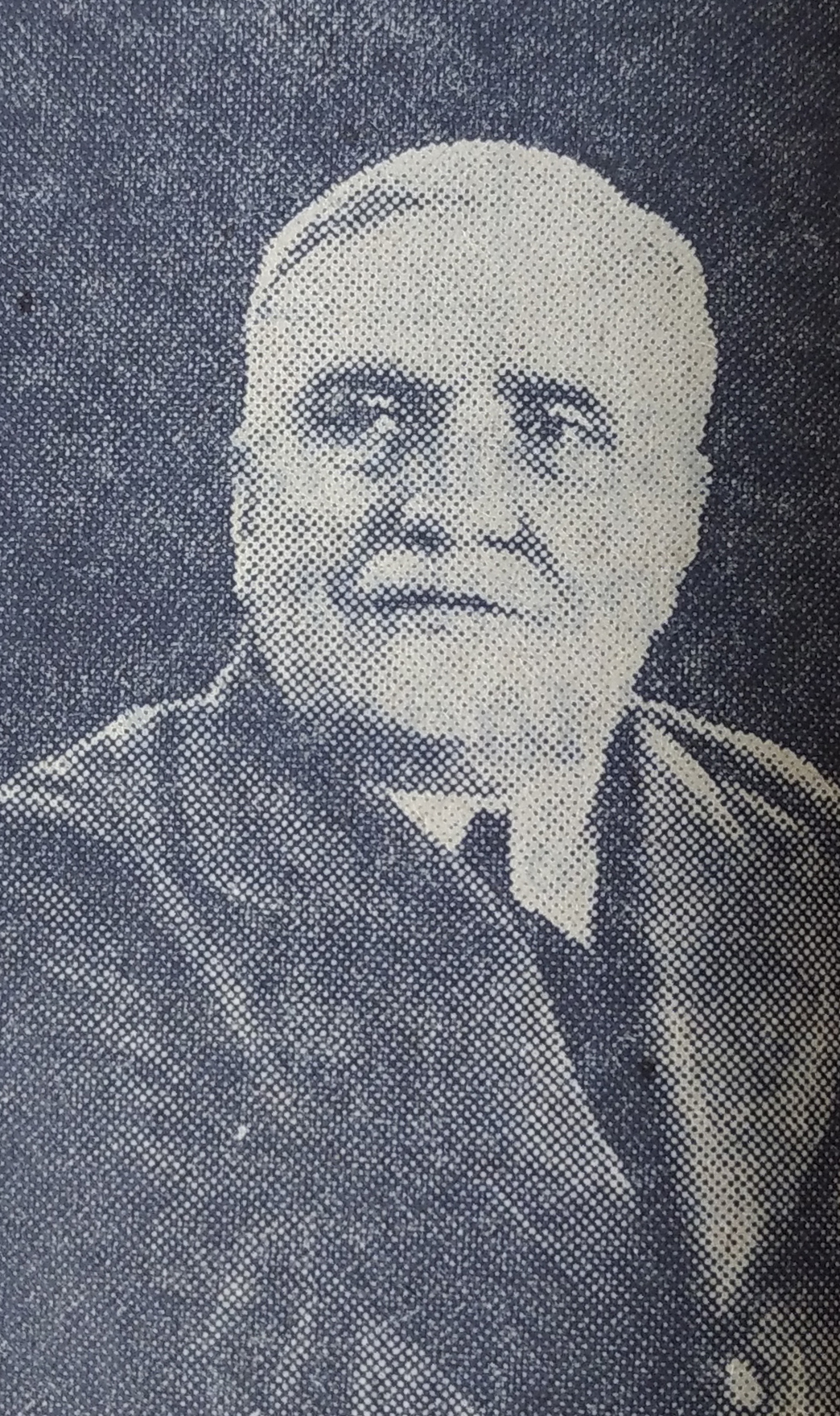
- Ivan Mashkov in 1937
- Born: 13 January 1867; Trubetchino, Tambov Governorate, Russian Empire
- Died: 13 August 1945 (aged 78); Moscow, Russian SFSR, Soviet Union
- Occupation: Architect
- Buildings: Sokol Building, Moscow
- Projects: Restoration of Moscow Kremlin Cathedrals and Novodevichy Convent

Ivan Pavlovich Mashkov (Russian: Ива́н Па́влович Машко́в, 13 January 1867 – 13 August 1945) was a Russian architect and preservationist, known for surveying and restoring buildings such as the Dormition Cathedral in the Moscow Kremlin, Novodevichy Convent, and other medieval structures. His best-known extant building is the Sokol (Falcon), a luxury Art Nouveau apartment building on Kuznetsky Most Street in Moscow. A prolific architect, Mashkov primarily designed eclectic buildings featuring Russian Revival elements.

== Biography ==
=== Education and early career ===
Ivan Mikhailovich Sokolov, born the son of a village blacksmith (Russian: Иван Михайлович Евдокимов), lost both his parents in early childhood. He was adopted by Pavel Karpovich Mashkov, a businessman from Lipetsk, and his wife, Natalya Yefimovna (née Andreyeva), and consequently took the name Mashkov. Natalya's brother, Alexey Yefimovich Andreev, was a town architect in Lipetsk.

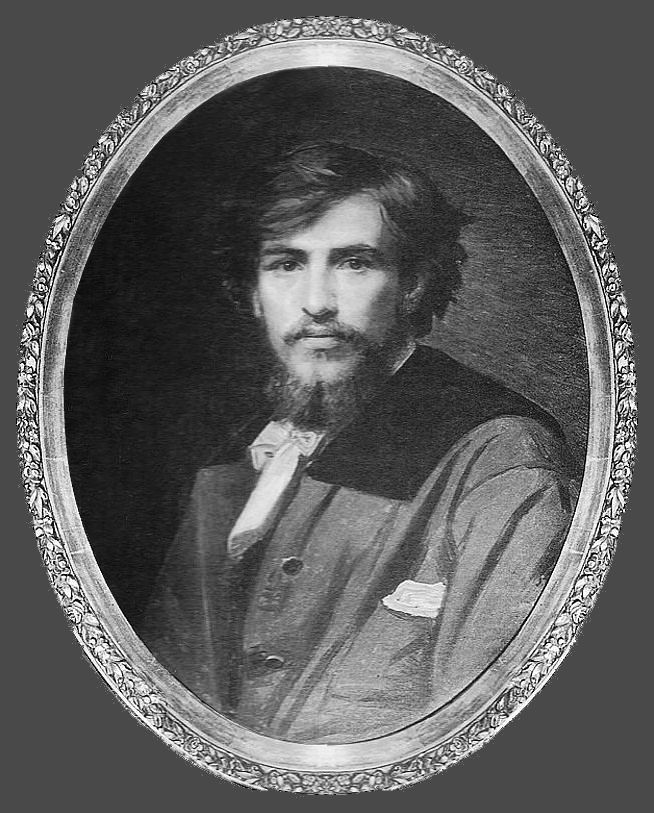
Portrait of Ivan Mashkov in 1886

In 1881, Mashkov was admitted to the Moscow School of Painting, Sculpture and Architecture. He graduated from the architecture class of Alexander Kaminsky in 1886, receiving an honorary medal and a construction license at the age of 19. This was considered an exceptionally rapid education; obtaining a professional license typically took 10 to 15 years after admission.

From 1885 to 1888, Mashkov assisted Konstantin Bykovsky with the planning of the Devichye Pole campus and August Weber with the completion of the Polytechnical Museum in Moscow. In 1889–1890, at the age of 23, he visited Lipetsk and completed two schools, a hospital, and a prison chapel there. Returning to Moscow, Mashkov completed over a dozen buildings before the age of thirty, and his masterpiece, the Sokol, at the age of 36.

=== Sokol Building ===
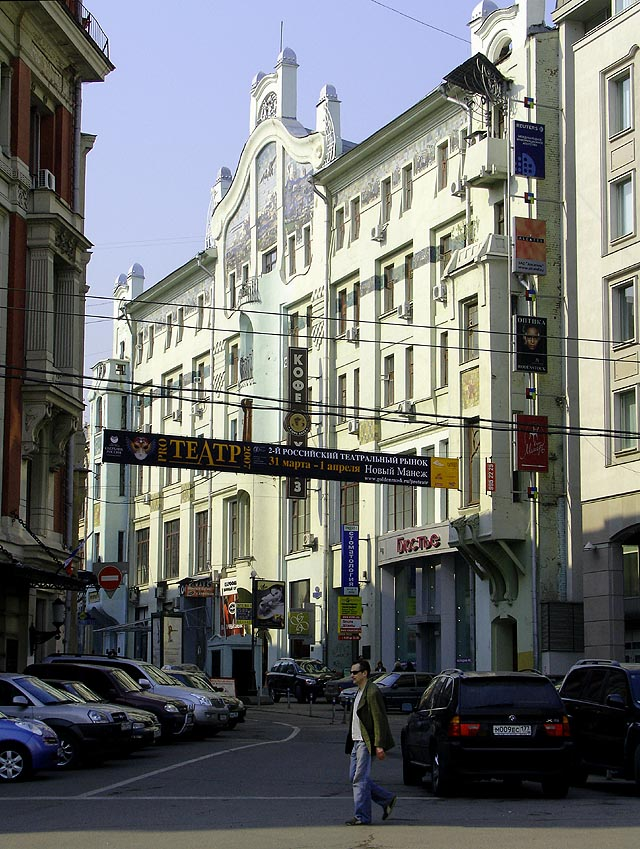
Sokol Building, 2007 photo

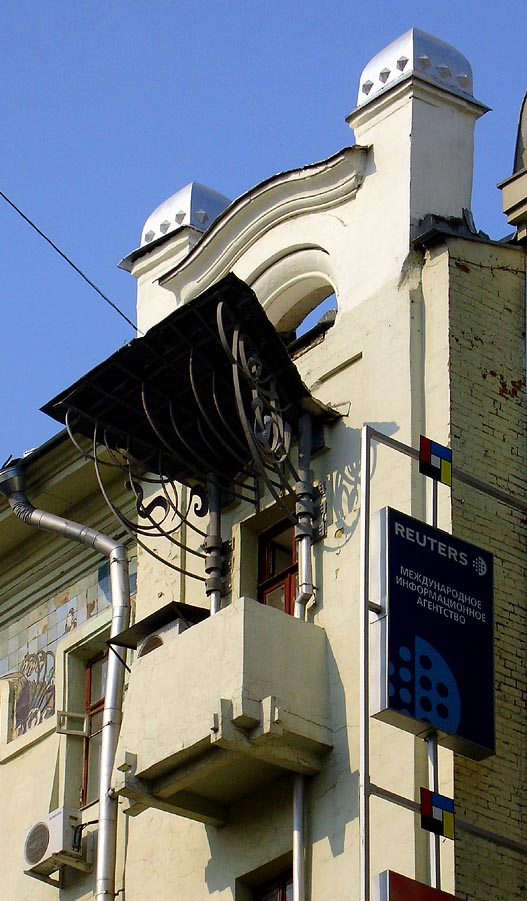
Sokol Building, detail, 2007 photo

Mashkov's Sokol building (Falcon) is considered unique not only within his body of work but also within Moscow Art Nouveau generally. It is the only building in the city designed in the original Vienna Secession style (Illarion Ivanov-Schitz designed a modified version). Its gilded roof and abundant forged iron ornaments resembled the work of Otto Wagner (these ornaments were eventually lost). However, the building is distinctly Muscovite; the shape of its frieze echoes the lines of the nearby Hotel Metropol.

The majolica mosaic depicting a falcon flying over a stormy sea was created by Nikolai Sapunov of the Mir Iskusstva art group. The subject of this mosaic is considered a double reference: to Maxim Gorky's Song of a falcon (1899) and to the nearby Moscow Art Theater's Seagull symbol (1903). Despite these artistic references and the similarity to Mashkov's original name, the building was named after M.V. Sokol, the owner.

=== Neoclassical revival ===
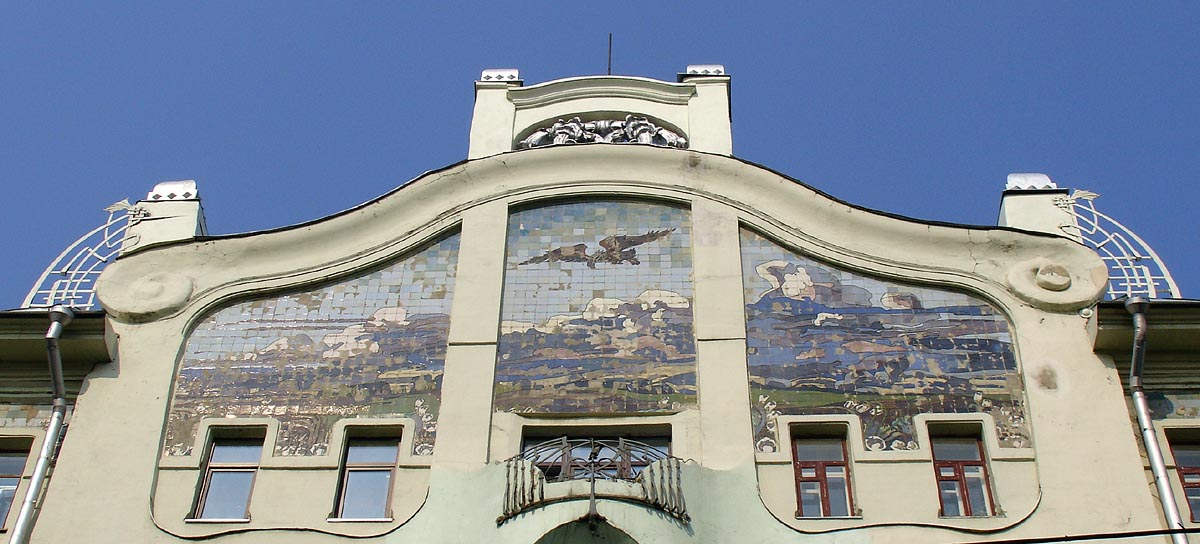
Mashkov's work before the Sokol building adhered to traditional Muscovite eclectics and moderate Russian Revival styles of the 1880s–1890s, and is not particularly distinctive among the numerous similar buildings from this era. An unusually large portion of his work was commissioned for public charities, which precluded expensive decorations and interiors. The only decoration he frequently employed was Abramtsevo majolica.

After the Russian Revolution of 1905, public interest in Art Nouveau declined, and architects responded with a revival of Neoclassicism. Mashkov completed two private buildings (the Tverskoy Pawn Shop and Eggert Apartments) in a stern, Saint Petersburg version of this style. In 1912–1913, he built his last major project, a psychiatric hospital on Poteshnaya Street (now Gannushkin Hospital). While these buildings did not become architectural landmarks, Mashkov did make a lasting statement with his iconic monument to Ivan Fyodorov (sculpture by Sergei Volnukhin).

=== Preservation and public activities ===
Like many contemporary architects, Mashkov was dedicated to studying and preserving historical national architecture, and in 1898 joined the Moscow Archaeological Society. He surveyed numerous historical churches and monasteries in Moscow, Dmitrov, Borovsk, and other locations, published his own studies, and edited the Society's journal. Mashkov supervised the restoration of Kremlin cathedrals, Sukharev Tower, St. Basil Cathedral's Cathedral, and other historical buildings. From 1908 to 1918, he also co-chaired the Moscow Architectural Society and contributed to the construction of the House of Architects (17 Yermolayevsky Lane, currently the Museum of Modern Art). From 1908 to 1933, he managed the Architectural Department of the Polytechnical Museum, which was a forerunner of the present-day Museum of Architecture. He is credited with editing a highly regarded guide to the architecture of Moscow (published 1913).

Despite his reputation as a preservationist and architectural historian, Mashkov joined the emerging skyscraper movement in 1913, proposing a 13-story high-rise on Tverskaya Street. The City Hall blocked this proposal and subsequently banned further high-rise construction in the center of Moscow.

=== Soviet period ===
At the time of the Russian Revolution of 1917, Mashkov was employed by the City of Moscow as deputy to the City Architect. The Bolshevik administration retained him in his office, and for some time Mashkov served as the City Architect, primarily engaged in maintaining the city during the civil war.

In 1929, Mashkov collaborated with sculptor Nikolay Andreyev to erect the neoclassical monument to Aleksandr Ostrovsky near the Maly Theater. Mashkov continued surveying historical buildings (some already scheduled for demolition) and led the restoration of Pashkov House (then known as the Rumyantsev Museum, later the Lenin Library, and now the Russian State Library). He did not participate in the architectural disputes of the 1920s but contributed to professional journals and wrote college textbooks (published 1935).

In 1934, Mashkov became a professor at the Moscow Architectural Institute; from 1935 he chaired the department of architecture at the Moscow Construction Institute. In 1937, he was awarded the title of Hero of Labor (established by a 1927 statute, a predecessor of the 1938 Hero of Socialist Labor title). Mashkov remained prominent in Soviet academic circles until his death and was buried with honors at Novodevichy Cemetery; his book on Novodevichy Convent was reissued posthumously in 1949.

== Buildings ==
=== Own design (extant buildings and monuments) ===
- 1890-1891 Rebuilding of Suchkova Estate, 15/28 Bolshoy Levshinsky Lane (now, UNESCO mission)
- 1899-1902 Public housing and almshouses, 6 and 10 Gospitalnaya Square
- 1899-1903 Public housing and almshouse, 19 Protopopovsky Lane
- 1900-1902 Mental asylum and almshouse, 16 Leningradsky Prospect
- 1902 - 3 Lopukhinsky Lane
- 1903 - 13 Mansurovsky Lane
- 1902-1904 - Cathedral of Trinity and St. Alexander Nevsky Convent in Akatovo, Klin district (demolished in part)
- 1903-1904 - Sokol Apartment Building, 3 Kuznetsky Most Street
- 1904 - Novodevichy Cemetery wall
- 1904 - 8 Second Boyevskaya Street
- 1904 - 60/2 Bolshaya Polyanka Street
- 1904-1907 - Polytechnical Museum expansion (Left Wing, Auditorium)
- 1905-1906 - 21 Leontyevsky Lane
- 1909 - monument to Ivan Fyodorov
- 1910 - School, 28 Vyatskaya Street
- 1912 - Tverskoy Pawn Shop, 23 Bolshaya Bronnaya Street
- 1912-1913 Gannushkin Psychiatric Hospital
- 1914 - Eggert Apartments, 4 Rossolimo Street
- 1929 - monument to Aleksandr Ostrovsky

=== Restoration ===
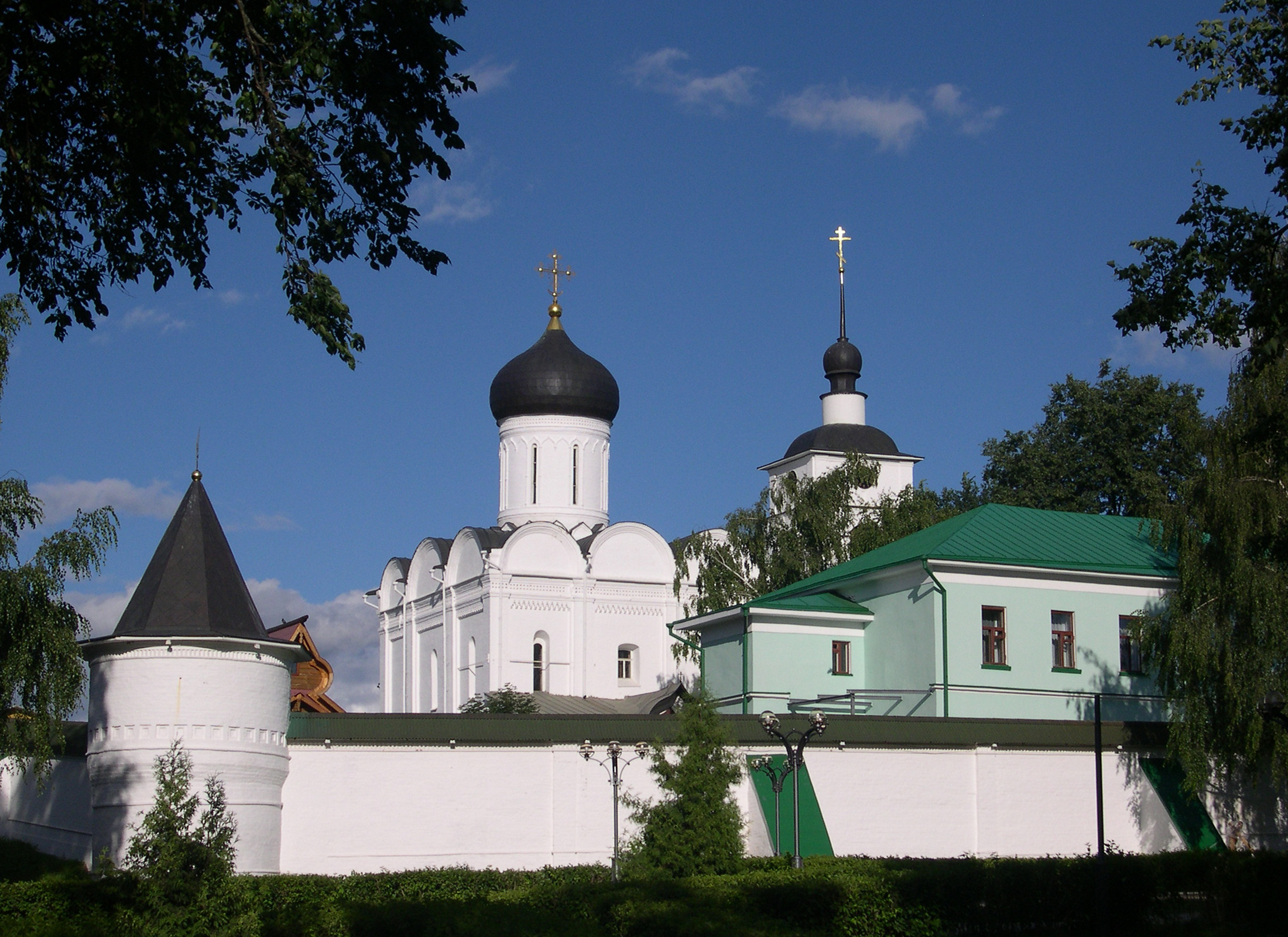
Borisoglebsky Monastery, Dmitrov

- 1899 - Church of St. George "v Pushkariakh", Moscow (demolished 1935)
- 1905-1945 - Smolensky Cathedral of Novodevichy Convent
- 1890s - Pafnutiev Monastery in Borovsk
- 1890s - Cathedral in Borisoglebsky Monastery, Dmitrov
- 1908 - Zyuzino church in Moscow, photo
- 1911-1915 - Cathedral of the Dormition in Moscow Kremlin
- 1925-1927 - Pashkov House Pashkov House (Russian State Library)
