= Wrubel =

Wrubel is a respelling of the Polish surname Wróbel ("sparrow"). It may refer to:

- Allie Wrubel (1905–1973), American composer and songwriter
- Art Wrubel (born 1965), American businessman
- Marshal Henry Wrubel (1924–1968), American astrophysicist
