= Novodevichy Convent =

Monastery in Moscow, Russia

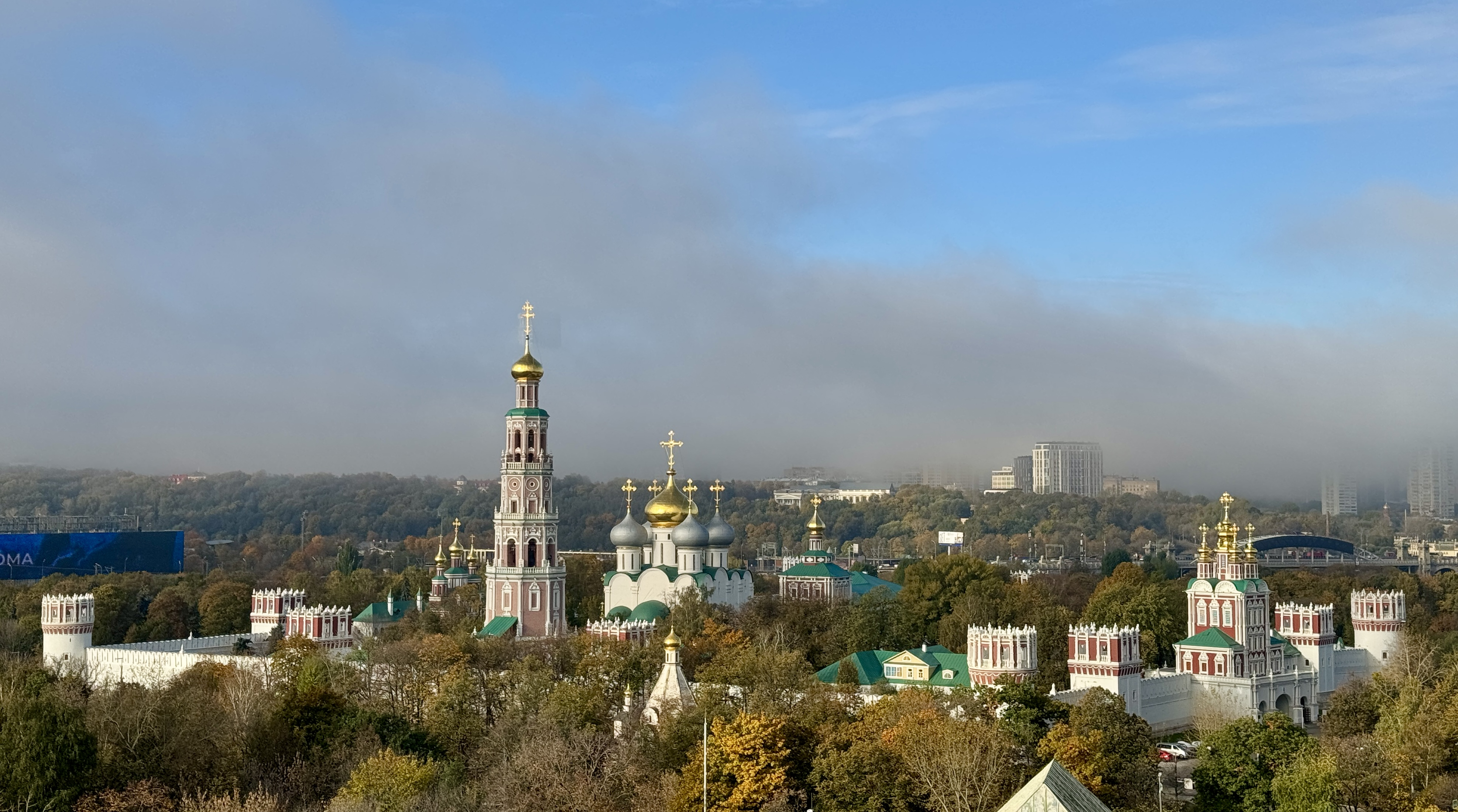
- Convent in 2024
- Interactive map of Novodevichy Convent

Monastery information
- Other name: New Maiden Convent
- Order: Russian Orthodox Church
- Established: 1524

People
- Founder: Vasili III of Russia

Site
- Location: Moscow, Russia
- Coordinates: 55°43′34″N 37°33′22″E

Novodevichy Convent (Russian pronunciation: [nəvɐˈdʲevʲɪt͡ɕɪj]), also known as Bogoroditse-Smolensky Monastery (Russian: Новоде́вичий монасты́рь, Богоро́дице-Смоле́нский монасты́рь), is probably the best-known cloister of Moscow. Its name, sometimes translated as the New Maidens' Monastery, was devised to differ from the Old Maidens' Monastery within the Moscow Kremlin. The convent was founded by Grand Duke Vasily III on May 13, 1524 in honor of the Smolensk Icon of the Mother of God "Hodegetria" - the main shrine of Smolensk, in gratitude for the capture of Smolensk in 1514. Unlike other Moscow cloisters, it has remained virtually intact since the 17th century. In 2004, it was proclaimed a UNESCO World Heritage Site.

== Structure and monuments ==
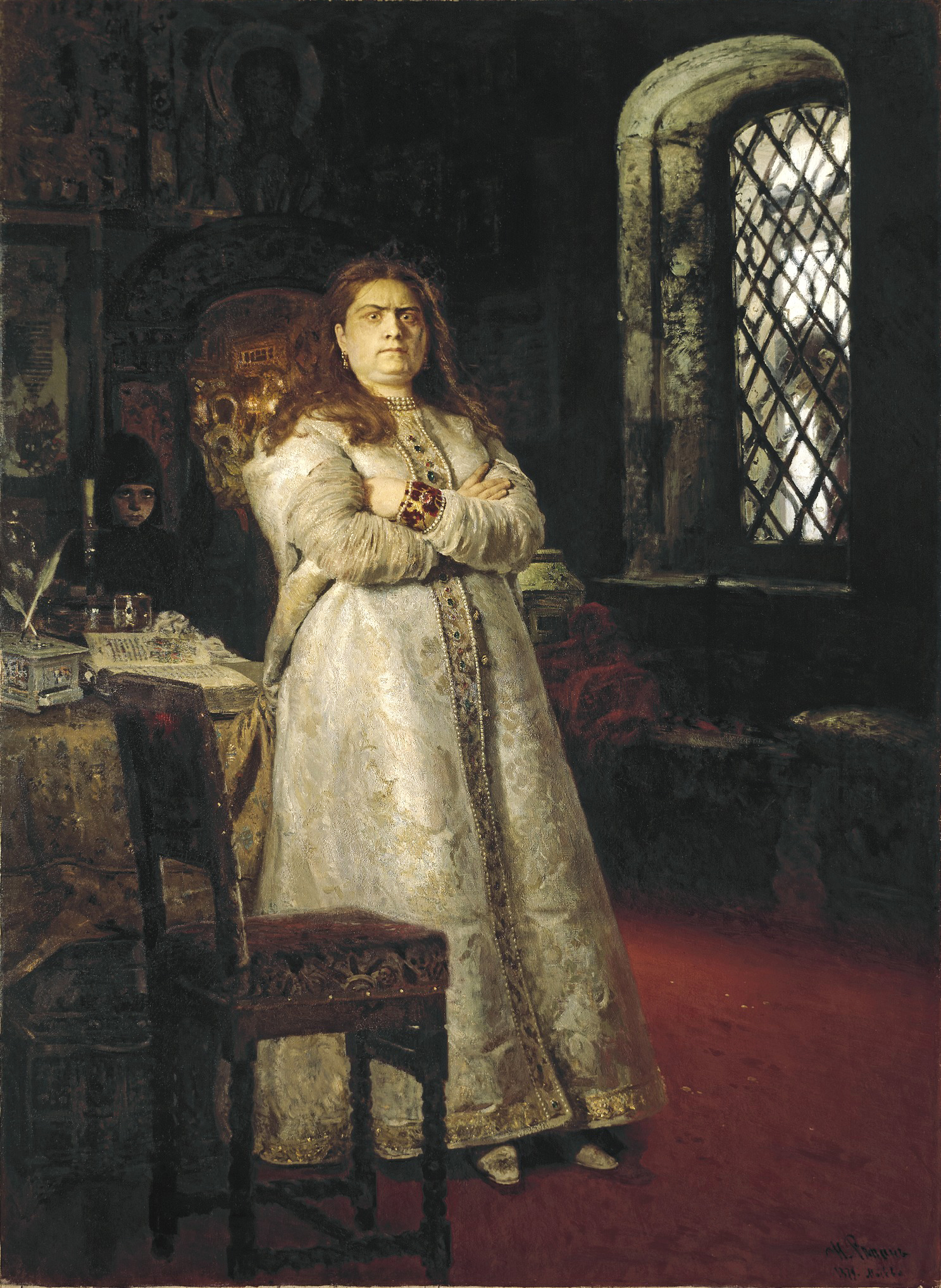
Tsarevna Sofia Alekseyevna at the Novodevichy Convent (1879), by Ilya Repin.

The Convent is situated in the south-western part of the historic town of Moscow. The Convent territory is enclosed within walls and surrounded by a park, which forms the buffer zone. The park is limited by the urban fabric of the city on the north and east sides. On the west side, it is limited by the Moscow River, and on the south side there is an urban freeway. The buildings are surrounded by a high masonry wall with 12 towers. The entrances are from the north (town side) and the south. The layout of the convent territory is an irregular rectangle stretching from the west to east.

The oldest structure in the convent is the six-pillared five-domed Smolensky Cathedral, dedicated to the icon Our Lady of Smolensk. It is situated in the centre of the axes between the two entrance gates. Extant documents date its construction to 1524–1525; yet its lofty ground floor, magisterial proportions, and projecting central gable are typical of monastery cathedrals built at the behest of Ivan the Terrible. Most scholars agree that the cathedral was rebuilt in the 1550s or 1560s. It was formerly ringed by four smaller chapels, in an arrangement reminiscent of the Cathedral of the Annunciation in the Kremlin. Its frescos are among the finest in Moscow.

The cathedral may be a focal point of the convent, but there are many other churches. Most date from the 1680s, when the convent was thoroughly renovated at the behest of the regent Sofia Alexeyevna, who was later incarcerated there. The blood-red walls and crown-towers, two lofty over-the-gates churches, a refectory, and residential quarters were all designed in the Muscovite Baroque style, supposedly by a certain Peter Potapov. In the old cathedral, a new bowl for holy water and gilded carved iconostasis were installed in 1685. Its four tiers contain 16th-century icons endowed by Boris Godunov; the fifth tier displays icons by leading 17th-century painters, Simeon Ushakov and Fyodor Zubov.

An arresting slender belltower, also commissioned by tsarevna Sofia, was built in six tiers to a height of 72 metres (236 ft), making it the tallest structure in 18th-century Moscow (after the Ivan the Great Bell Tower in the Kremlin). This light octagonal column seems to unite all major elements of the ensemble into one harmonious whole.

== History of the convent ==
=== Muscovite period ===
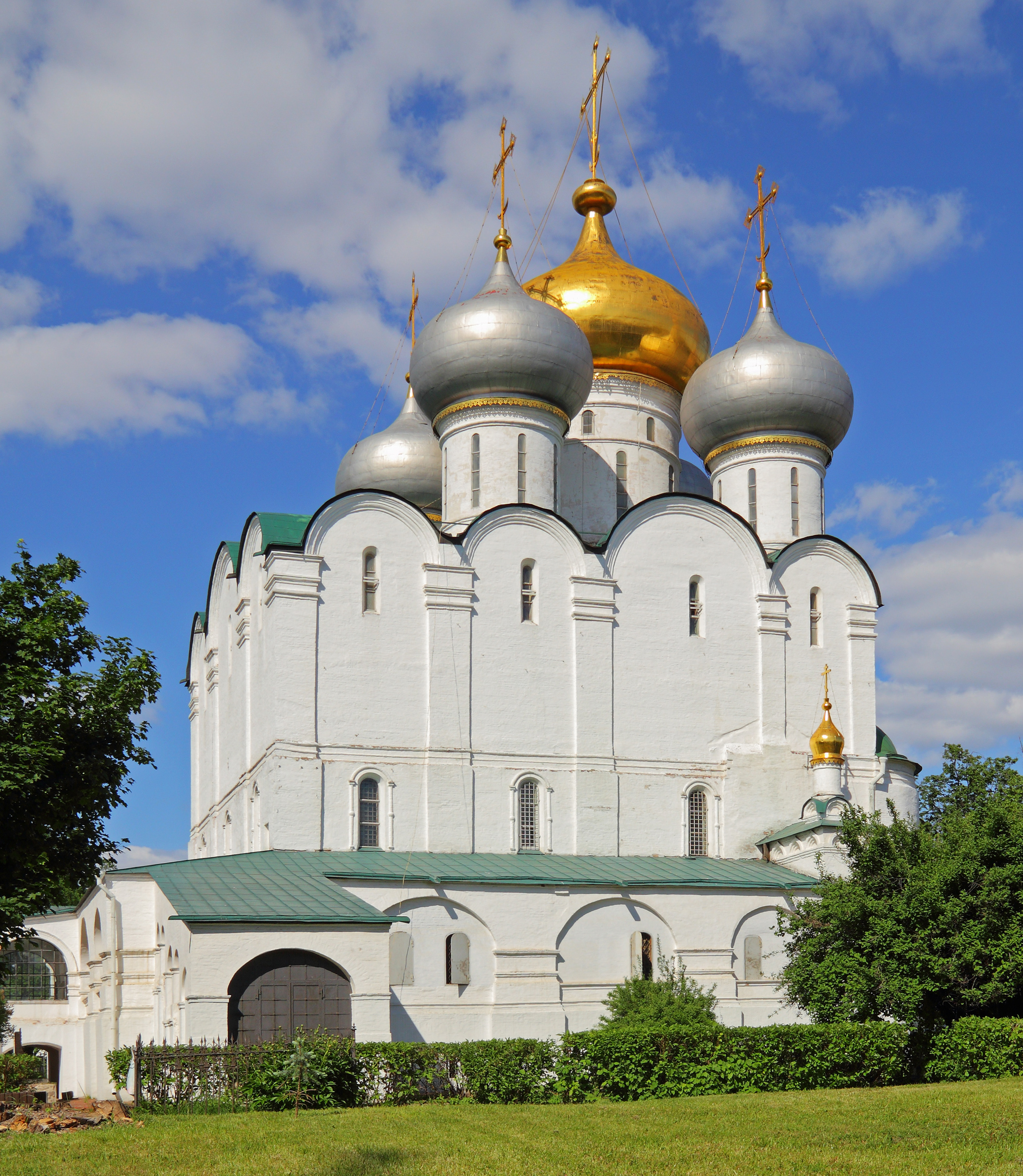
Cathedral of Our Lady of Smolensk at the Novodevichy Convent (16th century)

Vasili III, the Grand Prince of Moscow, founded the Novodevichy Convent in 1524 in commemoration of his conquest of Smolensk in 1514. The structure began as a fortress at a curve of the Moskva River three versts to the south-west of the Moscow Kremlin. It became an important part of the southern defensive belt of Moscow, which had already included a number of other monasteries. Upon its founding, the Novodevichy Convent was granted 3,000 rubles and the villages of Akhabinevo and Troparevo. Vasili's son, tsar Ivan the Terrible (reigned 1533–1584), would later grant a number of other villages to the convent.

The Novodevichy Convent housed many ladies from the Russian royal families and boyar clans who had been forced to take the veil, such as Ivan the Terrible's daughter-in-law Yelena Sheremeteva (in residence 1581–1587), Feodor I's wife Irina Godunova (in residence 1598–1603; she was there with her brother Boris Godunov until he became a ruler himself), Sofia Alekseyevna (Peter the Great's half-sister; in residence 1689–1704), Eudoxia Lopukhina (Peter the Great's first wife, in residence 1727–1731), and others. In 1610–1611 a Polish unit under the command of Aleksander Gosiewski captured the Novodevichy Convent. Once Russian forces had retaken the convent, tsar Mikhail Fyodorovich supplied it with permanent guards (100 Streltsy in 1616, 350 soldiers in 1618). By the end of the 17th century, the Novodevichy Convent possessed 36 villages (164,215 desyatinas of land) in 27 uyezds of Russia. In 1744, it owned 14,489 peasants.

=== Imperial period ===
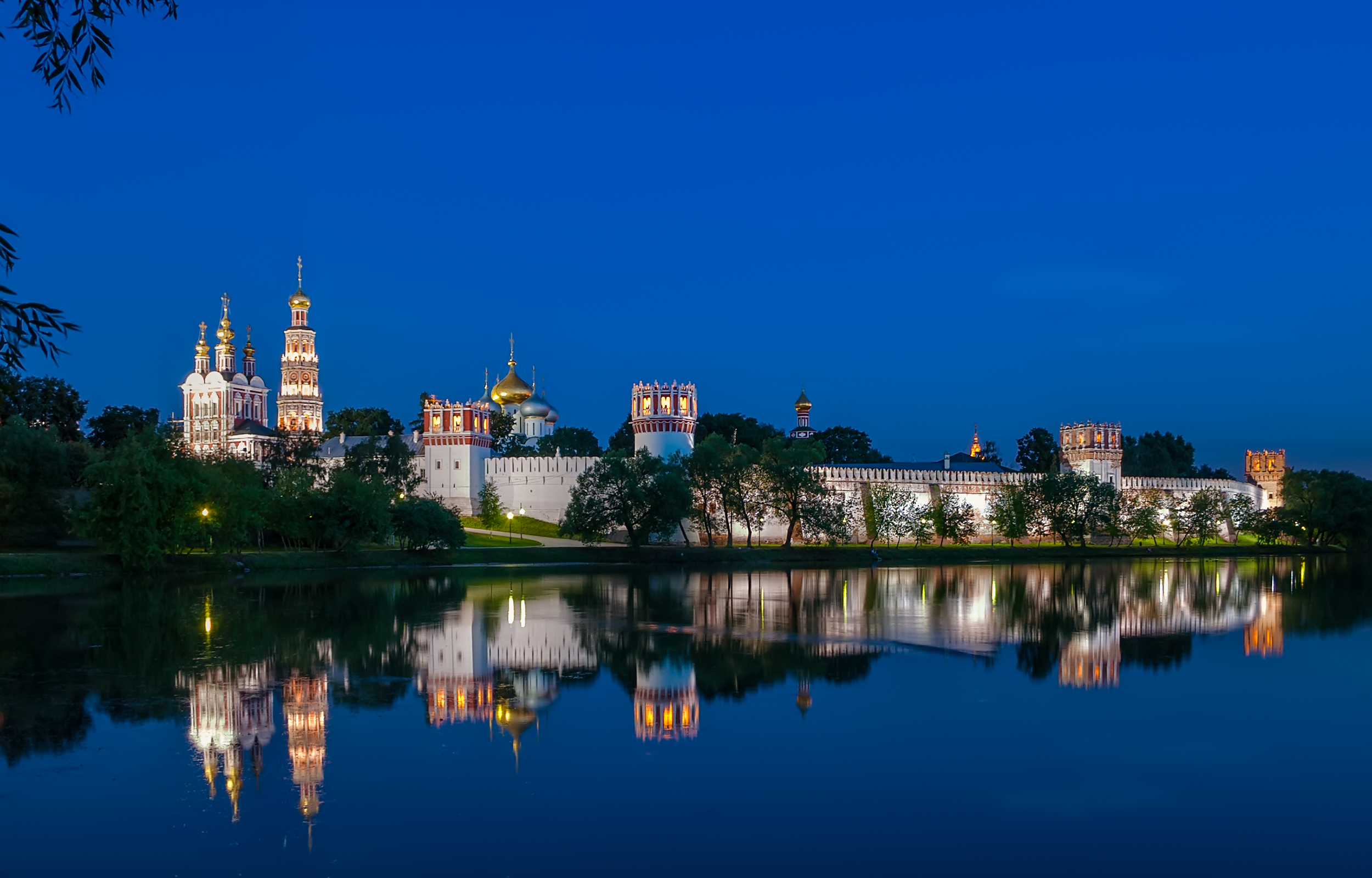
The convent at night

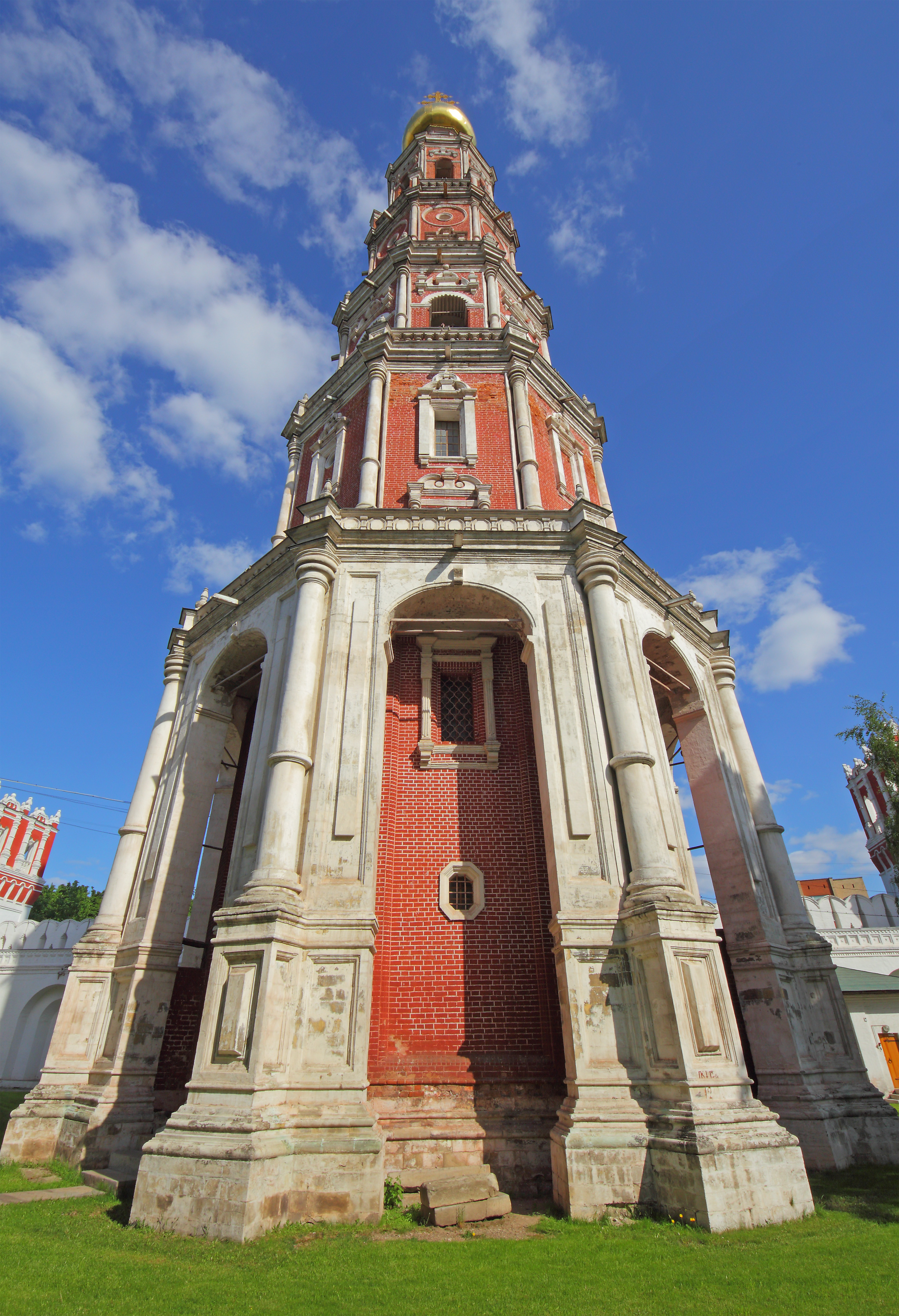
Octagonal bell-tower (1689–90).

In the mid-17th century, nuns from other monasteries in the Ukrainian and Belarusian lands were transferred to Novodevichy Convent, the first of whom was named Yelena Dyevochkina. In 1721, some of the aged nuns, who renounced the Old Believers movement, were given shelter. In 1724, the convent also housed a military hospital for the soldiers and officers of the Imperial Russian Army and an orphanage for female foundlings. By 1763, the convent housed 84 nuns, 35 lay sisters, and 78 sick patients and servants. Each year, the state provided the Novodevichy Convent with 1,500 rubles, 1,300 quarters of bread, and 680 rubles and 480 quarters of bread for more than 250 abandoned children.

In 1812, Napoleon's army made an attempt to blow up the convent, but the nuns managed to save the cloister from destruction. In Tolstoy's War and Peace, Pierre was to be executed under the convent walls. In another novel of his, Anna Karenina, Konstantin Lyovin (a main character) meets his future wife Kitty ice-skating near the monastery walls. Indeed, the Maiden's Field (as a meadow in front of the convent came to be known) was the most popular skating-rink in 19th-century Moscow. Tolstoy himself enjoyed skating here when he lived nearby, in the district of Khamovniki.

In 1871, the Filatyev brothers donated money for a shelter-school for the orphans of "ignoble origins". Also, the convent housed two almshouses for nuns and lay sisters. In early 1900s, the Cathedral was surveyed and restored by architect and preservationist Ivan Mashkov. By 1917, there were 51 nuns and 53 lay sisters residing in the Novodevichy Convent.

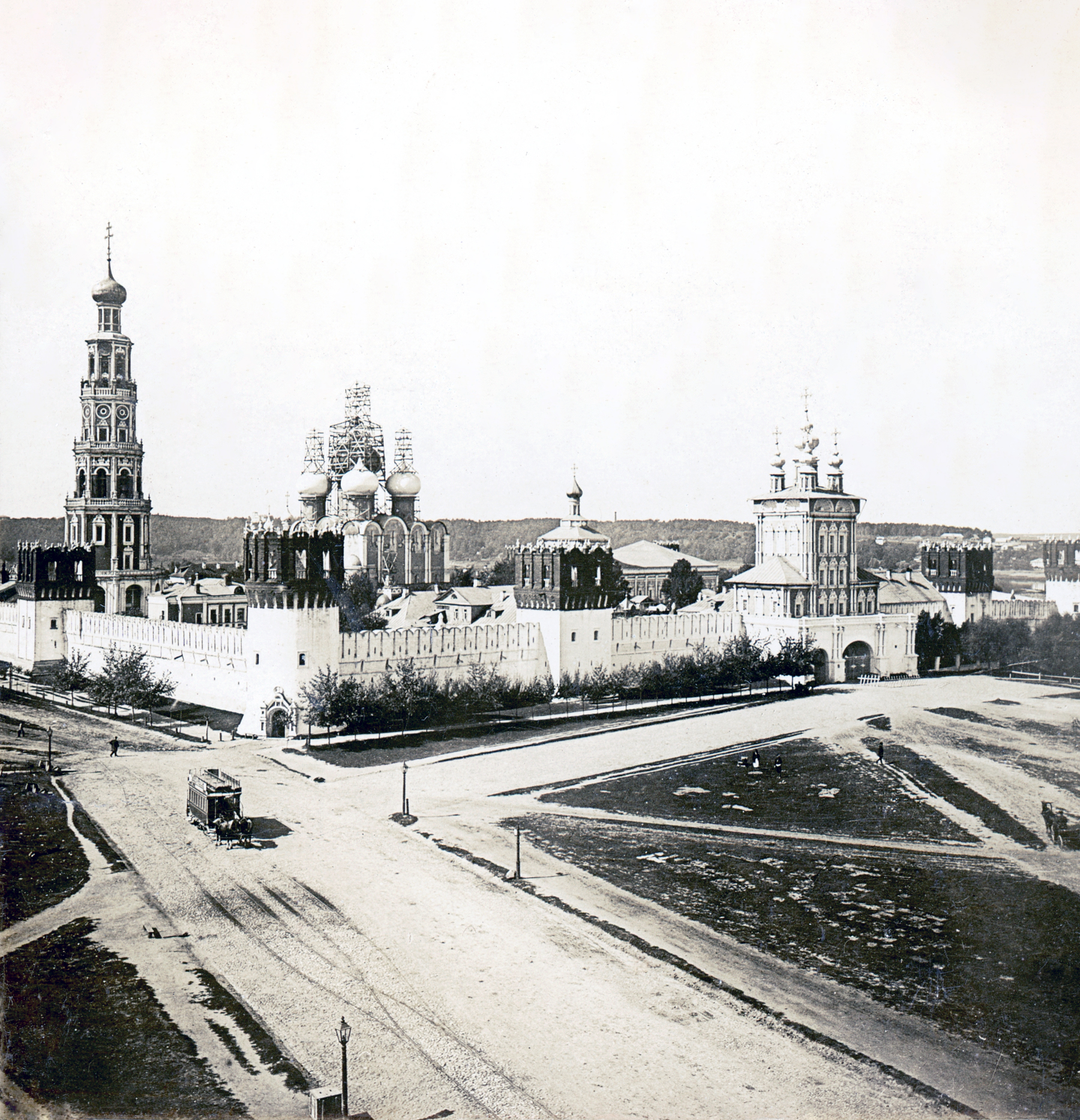
The convent in 1902

=== Soviet period and beyond ===
In 1922, the Bolsheviks closed down the Novodevichy Convent (the cathedral was the last to be closed, in 1929) and turned it into the Museum of Women's Emancipation. By 1926, the monastery had been transformed into a history and art museum. In 1934, it became affiliated with the State Historical Museum. Most of its facilities were turned into apartments, which spared the convent from destruction.

Since 1934, the Novodevichy Convent has become a branch of the State Historical Museum.

In 1943, when Stalin started to make advances to the Russian Orthodox Church during World War II, he sanctioned opening the Moscow Theological Courses at the convent. Next year the program was transformed and became the Moscow Theological Institute.In 1944, the Transfiguration Gate Church was opened. In 1945, the Soviets returned Assumption Cathedral to the believers. The residence of the Metropolitan of Krutitsy and Kolomna has been located in the Novodevichy Convent since 1980.

In 1994, nuns returned to the convent, which is currently under the authority of the Metropolitan of Krutitsy and Kolomna. Some of the churches and other monastic buildings are still affiliated with the State Historical Museum. In 1995, religious services resumed in the convent on patron saint's days.

==== UNESCO World Heritage Site proclamation ====
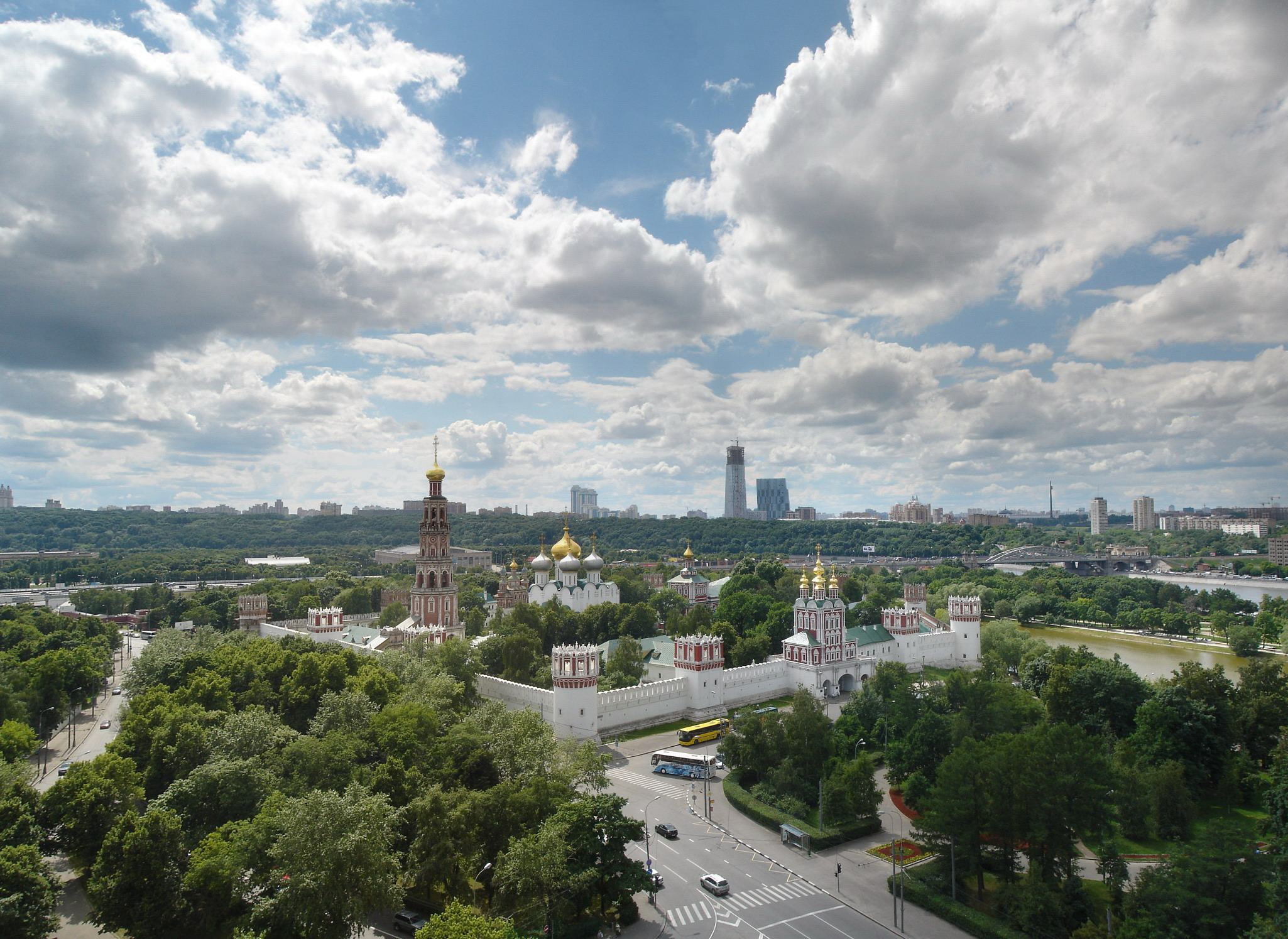
Aerial view

In 2004, the Novodevichy Convent was proclaimed a UNESCO World Heritage Site. In the UNESCO team evaluation, it was affirmed that the convent is the most outstanding example of the so-called "Moscow Baroque". Apart from its fine architecture and decorative details, the site is characterised by its town-planning values. The team also pointed out that the convent is an outstanding example of an exceptionally well preserved monastic complex, and that it integrates the political and cultural nature of the existing World Heritage site of Moscow Kremlin. Moreover, the convent is itself closely related to Russian Orthodoxy and the Russian history of the 16th and 17th centuries.

==== Bell tower fire ====
On March 15, 2015, a fire engulfed the convent's tallest bell tower, which pinnacles at a height of 72 meters. The monastery had been undergoing major repair work and was covered in scaffolding. It took firefighters almost three hours to put out the fire. The blaze reportedly affected an area of three hundred square metres, but it was restricted to the scaffolding and did not do any damage to the historical building itself. The speculated cause of the fire was a short circuit caused by heat guns used for drying the facade. The press service for the Moscow cultural heritage department blamed the fire on the firm doing the restoration work. However, Russian Deputy Culture Minister Grigory Pirumov said heat guns were not in use on the territory of the convent and the bell tower had been disconnected from the mains power supply.

== Necropolis and cemetery ==
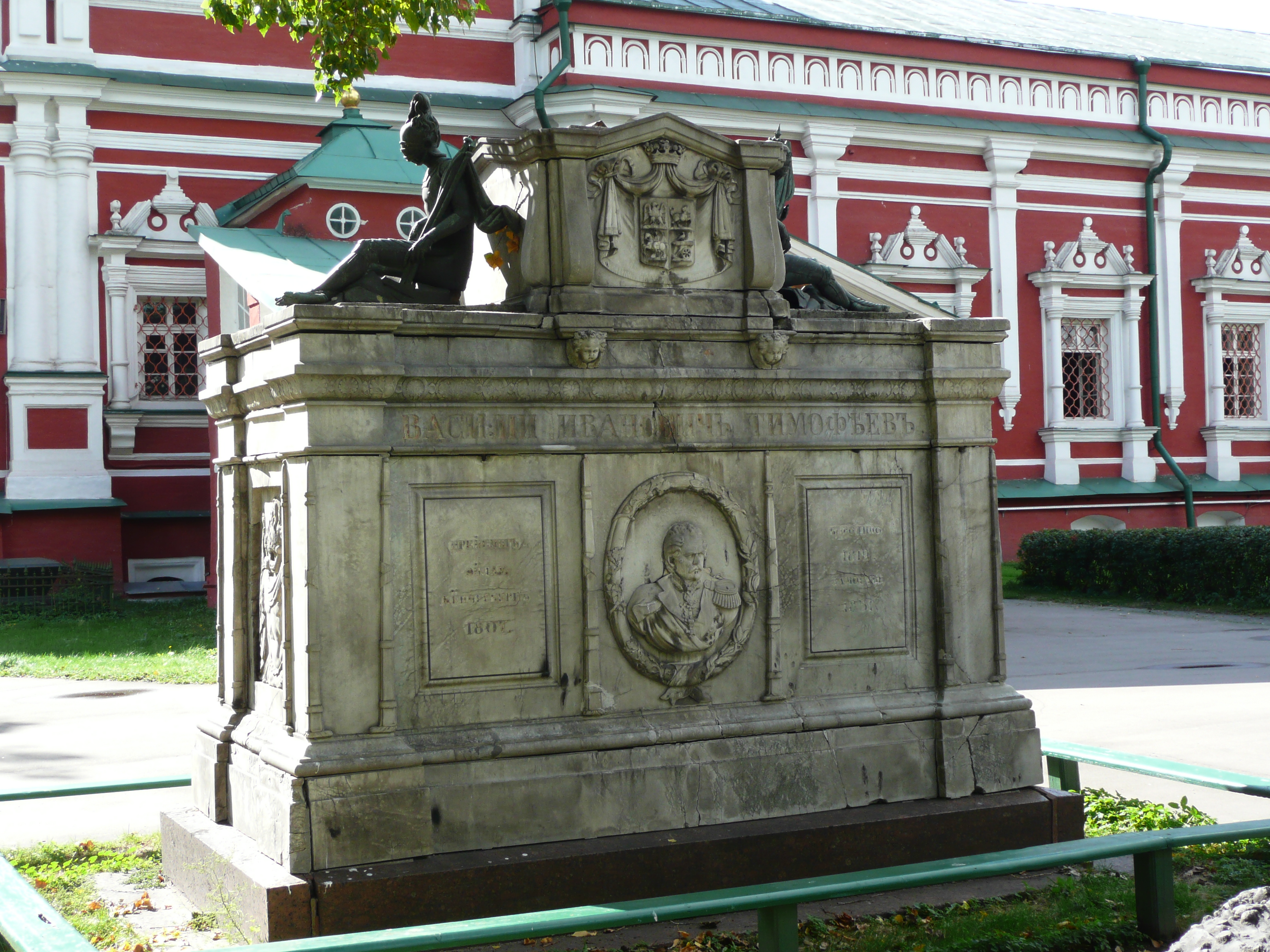
The ornate tomb of General Timofeyev (1783–1850)

The Necropolis of the Novodevichy Convent was initiated already in the 16th century. Like other Moscow monasteries (notably the Danilov and the Donskoy), the Convent was coveted by the Russian nobility as a place of burial. Sergey Solovyov and Alexei Brusilov are only two of the many prominent Muscovites buried within convent walls. The Napoleonic hero Denis Davydov is also buried in the grounds.

In 1898–1904, the so-called Novodevichy Cemetery was established outside the south wall. Anton Chekhov was one of the first notables to be interred at the new cemetery, and Nikolai Gogol was later reburied there too. During the Soviet epoch, it was turned into the most high-profile cemetery in the Soviet Union, with Peter Kropotkin, Nikita Khrushchev, Sergei Prokofiev, Dmitri Shostakovich, Konstantin Stanislavski, Boris Yeltsin, and Mstislav Rostropovich being interred there.

== See also ==
- 16th-century Western domes
