= Vrabac (surname) =

Vrabac is a surname. It may refer to:

- Adin Vrabac (born 1994), Bosnia and Herzegovina basketball player
- Damir Vrabac (born 1962), Bosnia and Herzegovina footballer
- Dinko Vrabac (born 1963), Bosnia and Herzegovina footballer

== See also ==
- Vrabec
