= Vrubel =

Vrubel is a Russian language surname, a transcription of the Polish surname Wróbel into Russian. Notable people with the surname include:

- Dmitri Vrubel (1960–2022), Russian painter
- Mikhail Vrubel (1856–1910), Russian painter
- Nadezhda Zabela-Vrubel (1868–1913), Lithuania-born Russian opera singer of Ukrainian descent, wife of Mikhail Vrubel
