= Sergey Konenkov =

Russian and Soviet sculptor

- Сергей Тимофеевич Коненков
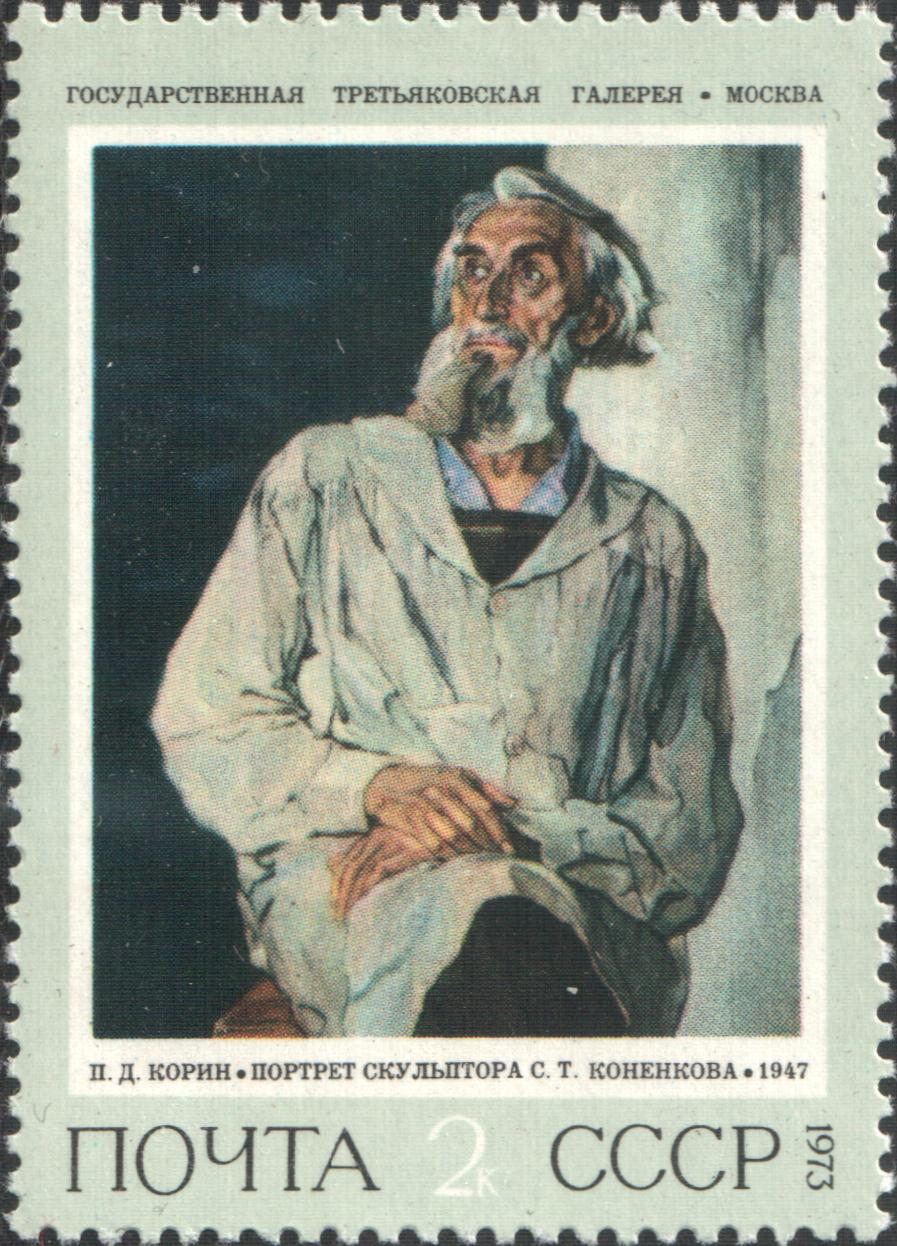
- Pavel Korin, Sergey Konenkov, 1947, oil on canvas, Tretyakov Gallery, Moscow; appears as shown on the 1974 Soviet postage stamp
- Born: July 10, 1874; Karakovichi, Smolensk Governorate, Russian Empire
- Died: December 9, 1971 (aged 97); Moscow, Russian SFSR, Soviet Union
- Resting place: Novodevichy Cemetery, Moscow
- Education: Moscow School of Painting, Sculpture and Architecture
- Alma mater: St. Petersburg Academy of Arts
- Known for: Sculpture
- Spouse: Margarita Vorontsova (m. 1922)
- Awards: Golden star of the Hero of Socialist Labour

Sergey Timofeyevich Konenkov, also Sergei Konyonkov (Russian: Серге́й Тимофеевич Конёнков; 10 July [O.S. 28 June] 1874 – 9 December 1971) was a Russian and Soviet sculptor. He was often called "the Russian Rodin".

== Early life ==
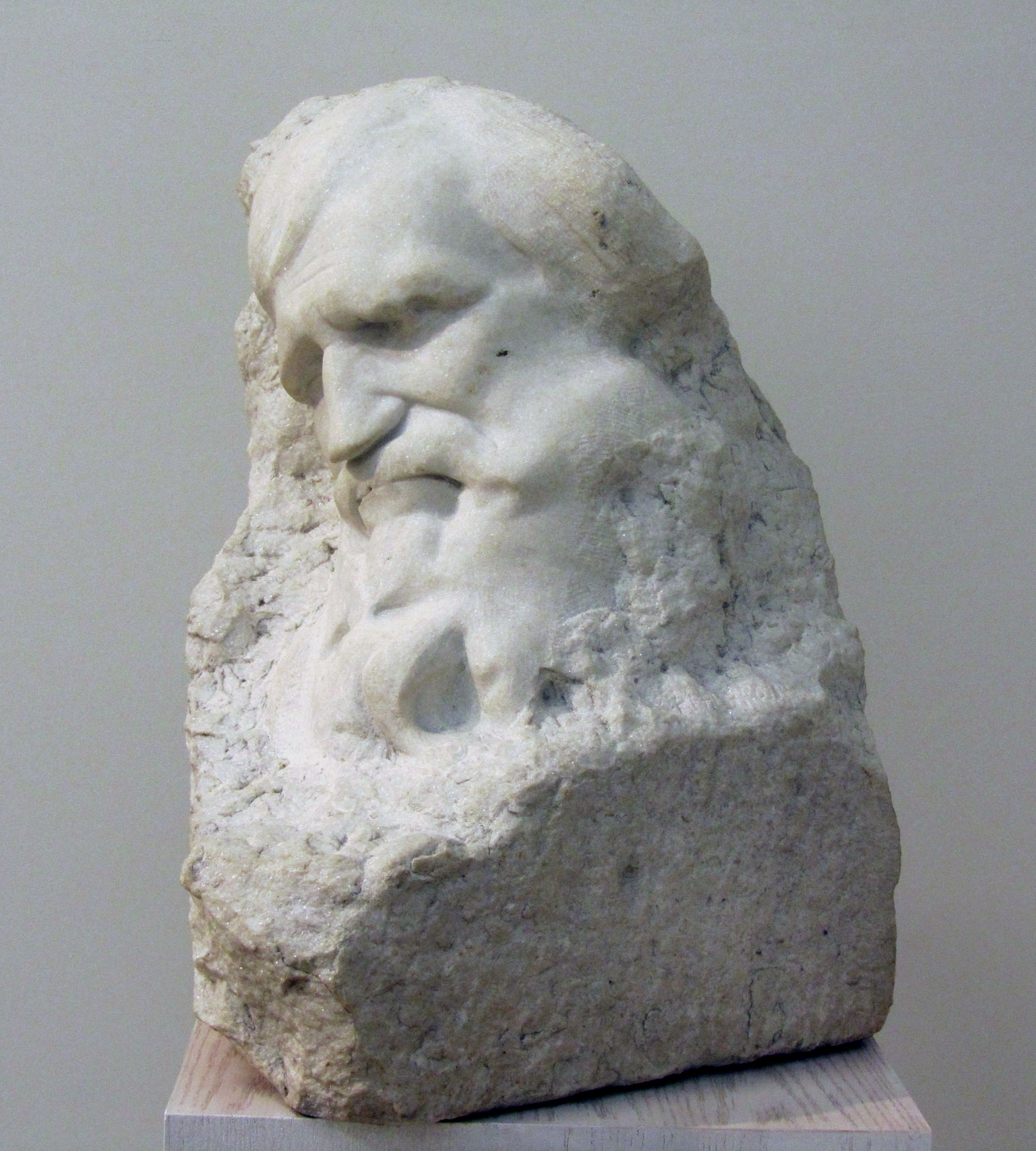
Pensador, 1898, Sergey Konenkov

Konenkov was born in a peasant family, in a village of Karakovichi in Smolensk province. Sergey studied at the Moscow School of Painting, Sculpture and Architecture, graduating in 1897, and at the St. Petersburg Academy of Arts. His diploma work at the Academy - a huge clay statue of Samson tearing the chains - broke most existing laws of academic art and put him at odds with his teachers, who apparently destroyed the work with hammers.

== 1900-1922 period ==
He travelled to Italy, France, Egypt, Greece, and Germany.

During the Russian Revolution of 1905 Konenkov was with the workers on the barricades, soon after creating portraits of the heroes of the rebellion in Moscow.

When Konenkov visited the house of the art collector Ivan Morozov, an eye-witness account says he was very dismissive: He claimed that the works by Maurice Denis, Manet, Degas and Aristide Maillol were rubbish. Morozov replied that he just loved Konenkov, who replied that he did not care. When Morozov showed Konenkov works by Vrubel and Victor Borisov-Musatov, which he praised, but questioned why they were being hidden in Morozov's bedroom.

Konenkov sold three sculptures to Morozov before the war: A pair entitled Torso made of marble with one created by Richard Guinot, Maillol's assistant, and Konenkov wooden carving entitled Young Woman. During the war he sold Morozov two more.

Konenkov supported the Russian Revolution of 1917. Following the Bolshevik seizure of power Konenkov started work for Narkompros, the new People's Commissariat for Enlightenment. In this capacity he returned to the Morozov mansion to deliver a preservation order for Ivan Morozov's art collection.

== Work in US ==
In 1922 Konenkov married Margarita Ivanovna Vorontsova, (Note: Margarita Ivanovna Kononkova also spelled Konenkova or Margarita Ivanovna Vorontsova was a Soviet intelligence agent that often met with Elizabeth Zarubina and also was a love interest of Albert Einstein. According to Pavel Sudoplatov in his book Special Tasks, Vorontsova, who Sudoplatov called "our trusted agent", was directed to gain information about the Manhattan Project and became a close confidant of Robert Oppenheimer who, later, was at Los Alamos. Vorontsova was to "influence Oppenheimer and other prominent American scientists who she met at Princeton" where Einstein lived.) and in 1923 they travelled to the United States to take part in the Russian Art Exhibition, which was held in 1924 at the Grand Central Palace. The trip was supposed to last for a few months, but Konenkov stayed in the States for 22 years, living and working in New York City.

In 1928–1929 the sculptor visited Italy to meet and work on a portrait of the Soviet writer Maksim Gorky. He had a personal exhibition in Rome.

During the American period, Konenkov created a large body of work focusing on Bible themes, notably the Apocalypse. He produced works depicting Jesus Christ and the Christian prophets and apostles.

In 1935 he was commissioned by the Princeton University to do a sculpture of Albert Einstein. It is said that Einstein was interested in the work of the Russian sculptor, but was more focused on his wife, Margarita Konenkova. Einstein and Margarita, who also was acquainted with the physicist Robert Oppenheimer, allegedly had a love affair, judging by "nine of the great scientist's apparently genuine love letters, written in 1945 and 1946." There have been allegations that Margarita was working in those years for the Soviet Government, but no concrete evidence has been provided to support the theory.

== Return to Russia ==
Under direct orders from Joseph Stalin in 1945, a ship was sent to New York to bring Konenkov back to the USSR. The sculptor was given a large studio on Gorky street in the centre of Moscow. He "had found favor enough with the regime to be asked to design a plaque commemorating the first anniversary of the October Revolution on the Senate Tower of the Kremlin."

Konenkov created sculptures of Aleksandr Pushkin, Anton Chekhov, Leo Tolstoy, Fyodor Dostoyevsky, Ivan Turgenev, Vladimir Mayakovsky, Konstantin Tsiolkovsky, Vasily Surikov, Johann Bach, Paganini, to name a few. He also made wood carved crosses and other pieces for the Marfo-Mariinsky Convent in Moscow.

Konenkov received numerous Soviet awards, including the golden star of the Hero of Socialist Labour, the order of Lenin and the title Peoples artist of the USSR.

He is buried in Moscow's Novodevichy Cemetery, with his Self-Portrait installed as tombstone.

A street in the Northeastern District of Moscow is named after Konenkov.

== Works ==
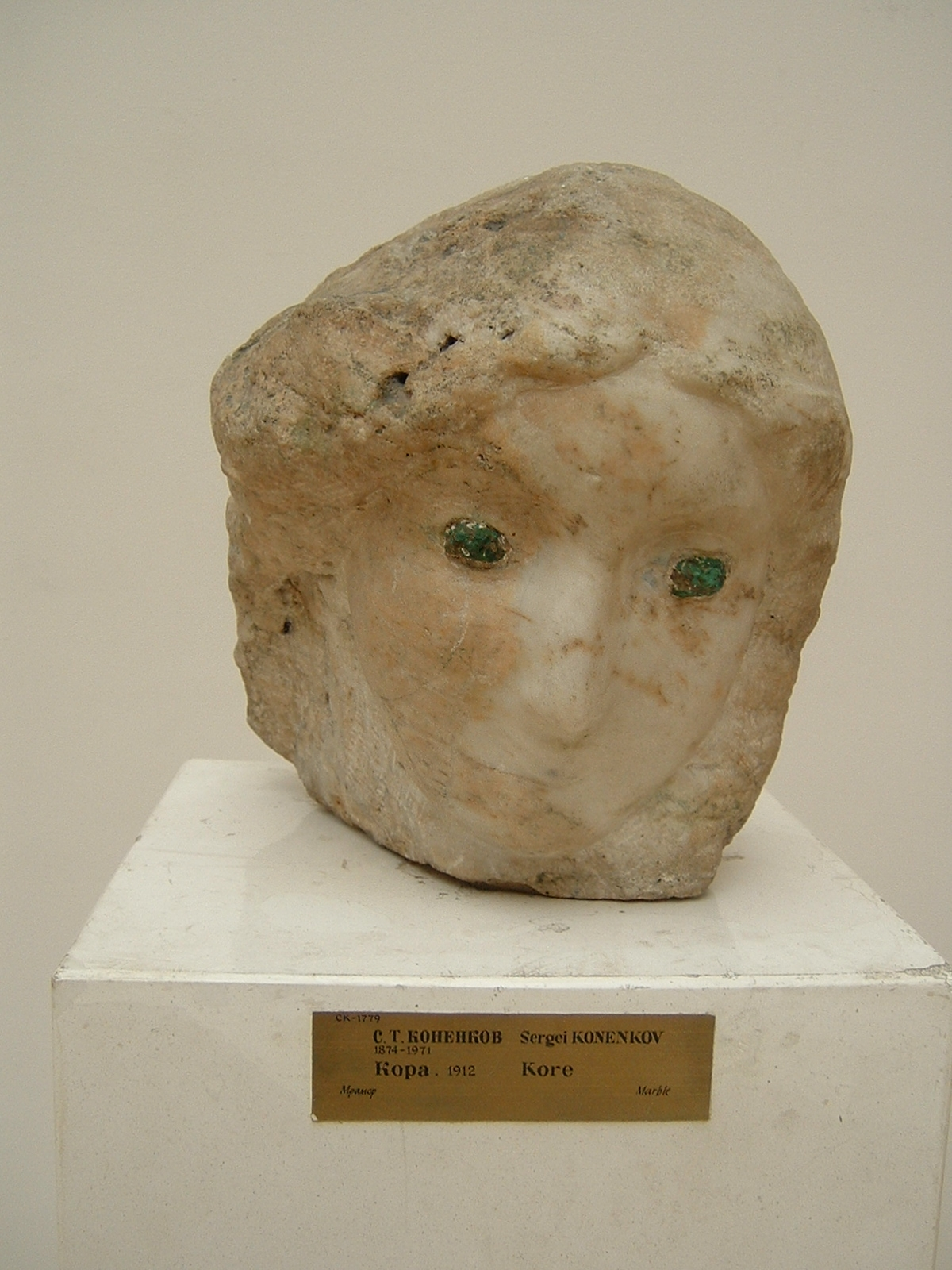
Kore (Russian: Кора), 1912

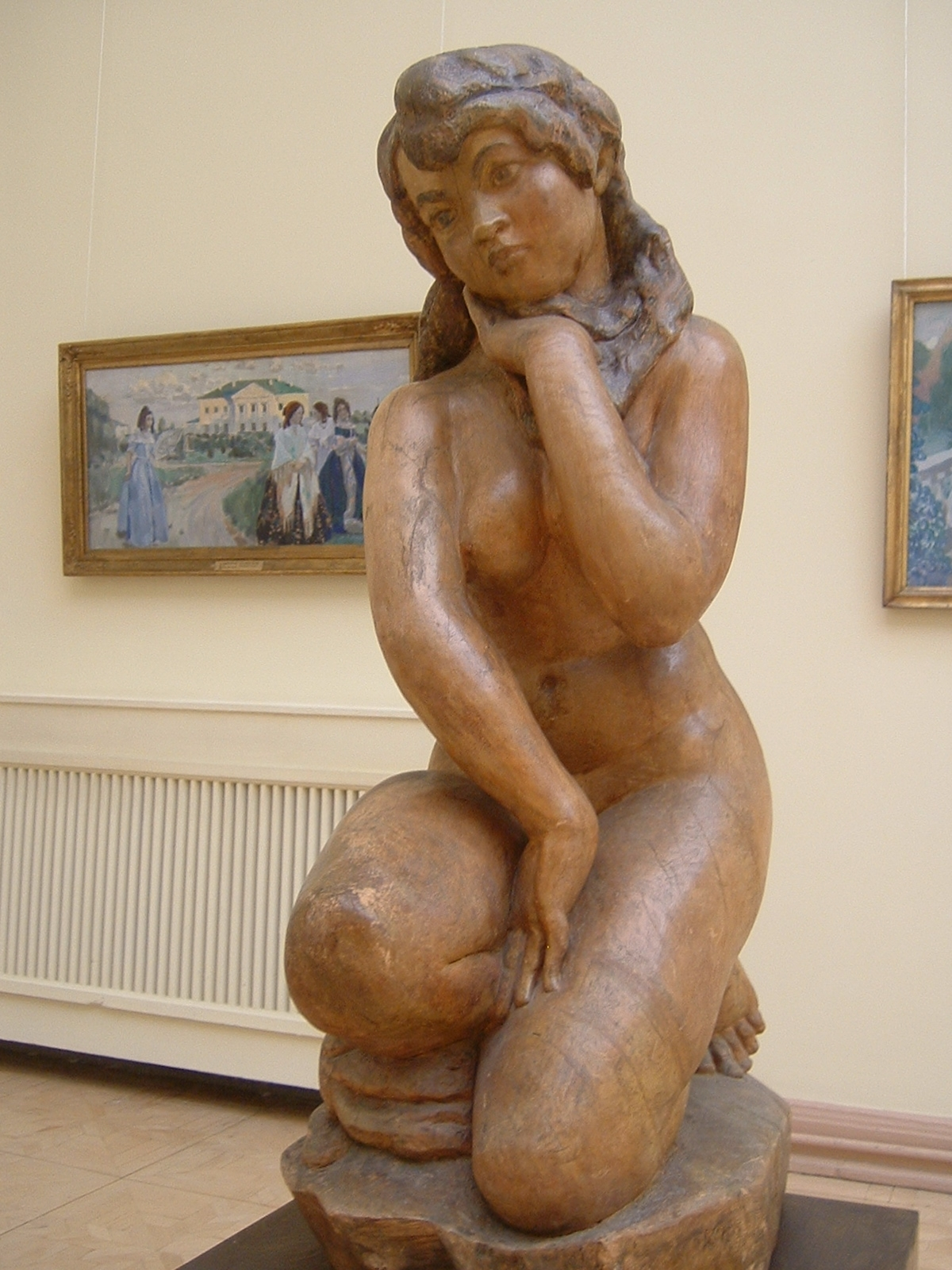
Bather (Russian: Купальщица), 1917

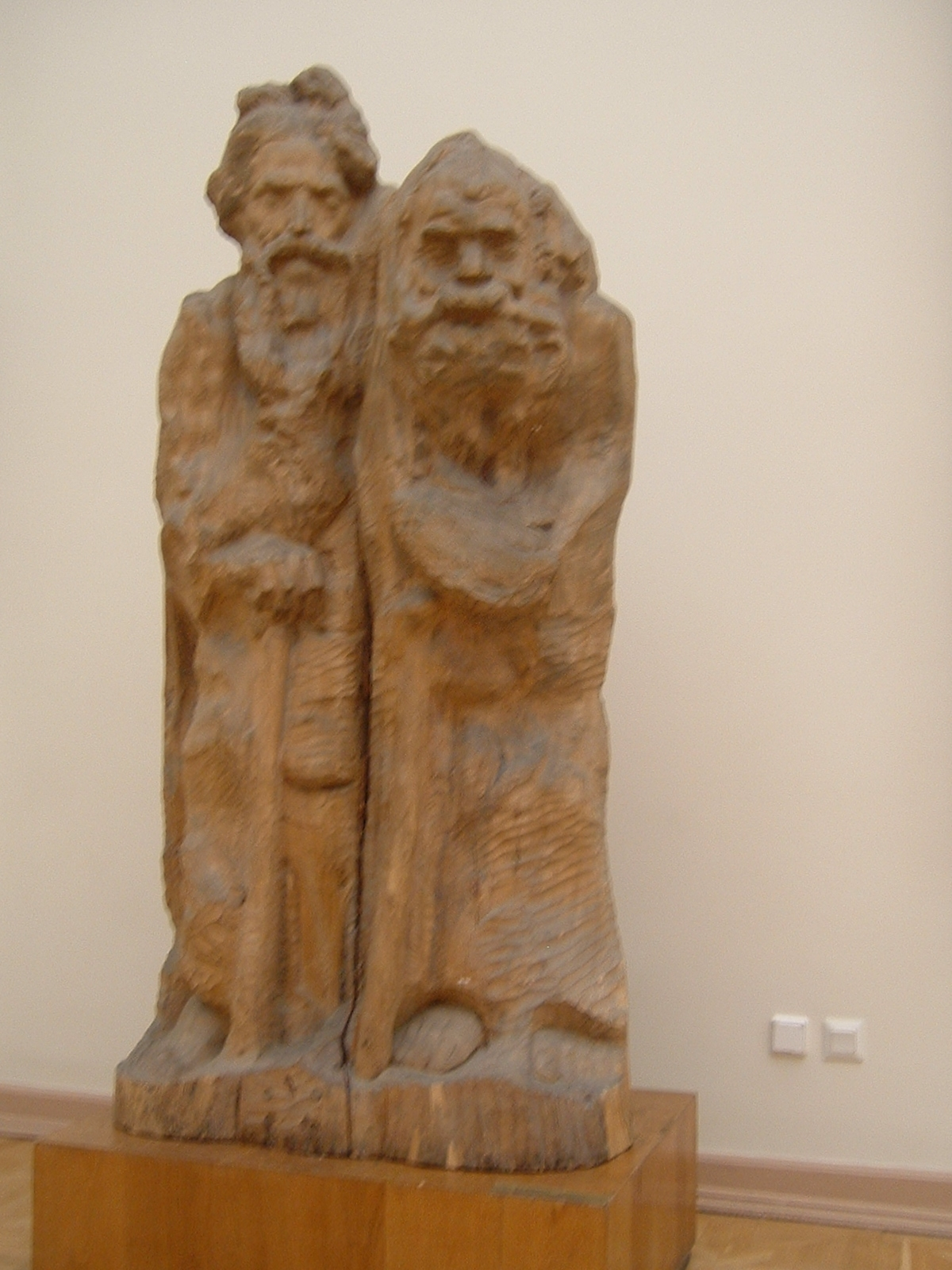
The Poor (Russian: Нищая Братия), 1917

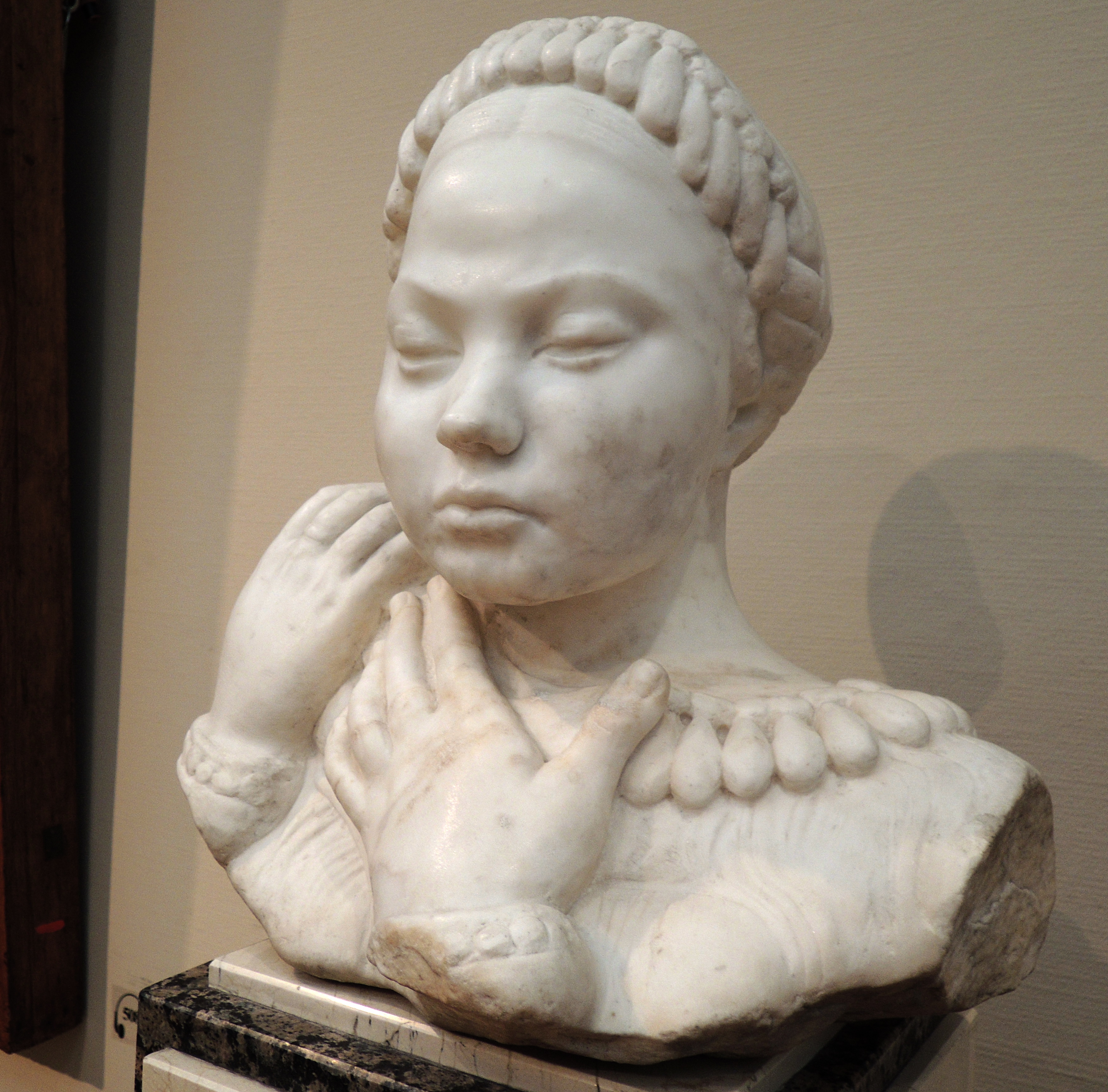
Lada (mythology) by Konenkov (1909, Tretyakov gallery)

== See also ==
- List of Russian artists
