= Christoph J. Brabec =

Austrian researcher

- Born: September 7, 1966 (age 60)
- Occupations: Materials scientist, academic and author

Academic background
- Education: Diploma., Physics; Dr.tech
- Alma mater: Johannes Kepler University Linz

Academic work
- Institutions: FAU Erlangen-Nürnberg

Christoph J. Brabec (born September 7, 1966) is an Austrian materials scientist, academic and author. He is a professor in the Department of Materials Science and Engineering and Chair of Materials for Electronics and Energy Technology at FAU Erlangen-Nürnberg, while also being a Director of the Institute of Energy and Climate Research at the Helmholtz Institute Erlangen-Nürnberg.

Brabec is most known for his research on organic solar cells, emerging photovoltaic technologies, renewable energies, and solution processed semiconductors (organic, inorganic, hybrid). He has authored, co-authored and edited research articles and books including Organic Photovoltaics: Materials, Device Physics, and Manufacturing Technologies and Organic Photovoltaics: Concepts and Realization. For his work, he has been named a Highly Cited Researcher by Clarivate 10 times since 2014.

Brabec is a Fellow of the Royal Society of Chemistry, and a co-chair of the board of Advanced Energy Materials, which he established with Manfred Waidhaas in 2011.

== Education and early career ==
Brabec obtained a Diploma in Theoretical Physics in 1992 and a Doctor of Technology degree in 1995, both from the Johannes Kepler University Linz, where he also worked as a Research Assistant from 1995 to 1998 with Serdar Sarıçiftçi. He joined Siemens Corporate Technology as a Principal Research Scientist and Project Leader from 2001 to 2004, and received a Habilitation in Physical Chemistry from the University of Linz in 2003.

== Career ==
Brabec served as Honorary Professor at the University of Groningen from 2018 to 2023 and has been Professor in the Materials Science and Engineering Department at FAU Erlangen-Nürnberg since 2009, heading the Institute of Materials for Electronics and Energy Technology.

Brabec is a member of the advisory boards for different institutions including the Amber consortium at Trinity College and the Plastic Electronics Center at Imperial College London.

Brabec worked with Konarka Technologies in various capacities, serving as Director of OPV in 2004; CEO of Konarka Nürnberg and Austria in 2005; and CTO and Vice President of Konarka Technologies, Lowell, USA, in 2006. As CTO, he was responsible for the development of the foundational aspects of scalable organic photovoltaic (OPV) technology. From 2009 to 2018, he was a member of the executive board of ZAE Bayern, the scientific director of the ZAE Research Division on Renewable Energies in Erlangen, and simultaneously held appointments as a member of the Scientific Management of the Energy Campus Nürnberg from 2010 to 2018 and Head of the Board of ZAE Bayern eV from 2013 to 2016. Subsequently, he served as the Director at the Helmholtz Institute Erlangen-Nürnberg from 2018 onwards, where he was involved in the initiation of the Helmholtz-wide Center for Innovation and Technology Transfer dedicated to emerging photovoltaic technologies, known as Solar TAP. He has been the Spokesperson of the FAU Profile Center FAU Solar and of the Energie Campus Nürnberg (EnCN) since 2023.

== Research ==
Brabec has contributed to the field of materials science by studying organic solar cells, emerging photovoltaics, solution-processed semiconductors, non-destructive imaging, and accelerated lifetime testing.

== Works ==
Brabec has authored, co-authored, and edited books on organic photovoltaics and technologies. In Organic Photovoltaics: Concepts and Realization, he presented an overview of organic/plastic solar cells, emphasizing their relevance in future solar energy systems. He also co-edited Organic Photovoltaics: Materials, Device Physics, and Manufacturing Technologies with Ullrich Scherf and Vladimir Dyakonov, providing insights into successful device design, covering materials, device physics, manufacturing, and commercialization considerations. In a review published in the IEEE Electrical Insulation Magazine, John J. Shea remarked, "This book has a very good technical depth and, as such, will be worthwhile for researchers either entering the field of organic photovoltaics or for those already involved with organic photovoltaic cell technology. Both will find this book to be an excellent resource of well-illustrated, clearly explained results from previous researchers."

=== Organic solar cells ===
Brabec researched organic solar cells throughout his career. In 2021, he took AMANDA Line One, in operation, an automated platform for rapid screening of organic photovoltaic materials. He also investigated energy-level offsets in organic solar cells, revealing that negligible offsets limit efficiency and suggesting the use of highly luminescent near-infrared emitters for improvement. Additionally, he improved organic solar cells' performance with a 77% fill factor in ternary blend bulk heterojunction cells, overcoming recombination limits by incorporating a highly ordered polymer, and an automated platform for efficient, material-saving optimization of quaternary blends to enhance photostability.

Brabec and colleagues explored the industrial potential of highly efficient organic solar cells (OSCs) and organic solar modules in the Solar Factory of the Future, located at EnCN. He also emphasized the industrial potential of single-component organic solar cells (SCOSCs) outperforming traditional bulk heterojunction (BHJ) cells with enhanced figures of merit, particularly in photostability.

Brabec has developed and demonstrated organic photovoltaics production at a GW fab.

=== Perovskite photovoltaics ===
Brabec's work on photovoltaics included various materials aspects, including perovskite solar cells. In a joint study published in Science, he introduced a new interface architecture using tantalum-doped tungsten oxide (Ta-WOx) for perovskite solar cells, achieving high efficiency and stability with scalable hole-transporting materials. He also enhanced perovskite solar cell stability with a heat-resistant perovskite composition and a bilayer contact structure, maintaining 99% peak efficiency over 1,450 hours at 65 °C. Furthermore, he examined photoinduced phase segregation in mixed-halide perovskites, and found that it occurs selectively at grain boundaries rather than within grain centers.

In a collaborative research, Brabec proposed a cost-effective method for efficient X-ray detection using millimeter-thick crystalline perovskite wafers (MAPbI3). His work also outlined a digital twin for photovoltaic materials that employs machine learning and high-throughput experimentation to accelerate innovation and enhance structure-property understanding.

== Awards and honors ==
- 2014-2023 – Highly Cited Researchers, Clarivate
- 2023 – Fellow, Royal Society of Chemistry

== Bibliography ==
=== Selected books ===
- Organic Photovoltaics: Concepts and Realization (2003) ISBN 978-3540004059
- Organic Photovoltaics: Materials, Device Physics, and Manufacturing Technologies (2008) ISBN 978-3527316755
- Photovoltaic Technologies, Devices and Systems Based on Inorganic Materials, Small Organic Molecules and Hybrids (2013) ISBN 978-1605114705

=== Selected articles ===
- Brabec, C. J., Sariciftci, N. S., & Hummelen, J. C. (2001). Plastic solar cells. Advanced functional materials, 11(1), 15–26.
- Brabec, C. J., Cravino, A., Meissner, D., Sariciftci, N. S., Fromherz, T., Rispens, M. T., ... & Hummelen, J. C. (2001). Origin of the open circuit voltage of plastic solar cells. Advanced functional materials, 11(5), 374–380.
- Shaheen, S. E., Brabec, C. J., Sariciftci, N. S., Padinger, F., Fromherz, T., & Hummelen, J. C. (2001). 2.5% efficient organic plastic solar cells. Applied Physics Letters, 78(6), 841–843.
- Scharber, M. C., Mühlbacher, D., Koppe, M., Denk, P., Waldauf, C., Heeger, A. J., & Brabec, C. J. (2006). Design rules for donors in bulk-heterojunction solar cells—Towards 10% energy-conversion efficiency. Advanced Materials, 18(6), 789–794.
- Dennler, G., Scharber, M. C., & Brabec, C. J. (2009). Polymer-fullerene bulk-heterojunction solar cells. Advanced Materials, 21(13), 1323–1338.
- Gumpert, F., Janßen, A., Brabec, C. J., Egelhaaf, H. J., Lohbreier, J., & Distler, A. (2023). Predicting layer thicknesses by numerical simulation for meniscus-guided coating of organic photovoltaics. Engineering Applications of Computational Fluid Mechanics, 17(1), 2242455.
