= Henryk Wróbel (footballer) =

Polish football player

Personal information
- Date of birth: 19 December 1934
- Place of birth: Poznań, Poland
- Date of death: 14 September 2024 (aged 89)
- Place of death: Poznań, Poland
- Height: 1.72 m (5 ft 8 in)
- Position: Midfielder

Senior career*
Years	Team	Apps	(Gls)
- HCP Poznań
–1952	Drukarz Poznań		
1952–1955	Lech Poznań		
1955–1956	Zawisza Bydgoszcz		
1956–1963	Lech Poznań	208	

Managerial career
- Lech Poznań U18
- * Club domestic league appearances and goals

Henryk Wróbel (19 December 1934 – 14 August 2024) was a Polish footballer who played as a midfielder. He was considered one of Lech Poznań's club legends.

During his career, he played as a midfielder, usually on the left. After three years of playing for the HCP factory club, he transferred to Drukarz Poznań.

He joined Lech Poznań in 1952, when club legends Henryk Czapczyk and Teodor Anioła were still there. He then completed his mandatory military service at Zawisza Bydgoszcz from which he returned to Lech 1956.

At Lech, he made 133 appearances in the second division and between 1957 and 1963 he made 75 appearances in the top flight Overall, he made in total 288 appearances for the club, including those in the third division when Lech suffered two relegations there.

He won the junior national title as manager of Lech's youth team in 1995. As a coach there, he worked with future first team and national team players Piotr Reiss, Arkadiusz Głowacki, Artur Wichniarek and Bartosz Bosacki.

He remained an active supporter of Lech throughout his life and lived in his later years in the Grunwald district of Poznań.
