= Vrabec =

Vrabec (feminine: Vrabcová) is a Czech and Slovak surname, which means 'sparrow'. A Czech dialectal form of the surname with the same meaning is Brabec. Notable people with the surname include:

- Ivan Vrabec (born 1963), Slovak football player and manager
- Ondřej Vrabec (born 1979), Czech conductor and horn player
- Petr Vrabec (born 1962), Czech football player and manager
- Roland Vrabec (born 1974), German football manager
- Thomas Vrabec (born 1966), Swiss ice hockey player

== See also ==
- Eva Vrabcová-Nývltová (born 1986), Czech cross country skier
